= Too Cute Crisis =

Japanese manga series

- First tankōbon volume cover

カワイスギクライシス (Kawaisugi Kuraishisu)
- Genre: Science fiction comedy
- Manga
- Written by: Mitsuru Kido
- Published by: Shueisha
- English publisher: Shueisha (digital)
- Imprint: Jump Comics SQ.
- Magazine: Jump Square
- Original run: October 4, 2019 – present
- Volumes: 14
- Anime television series
- Directed by: Jun Hatori
- Written by: Aya Satsuki
- Music by: Shun Narita; Yūsuke Seo
- Studio: SynergySP
- Licensed by: Sentai Filmworks
- Original network: Tokyo MX, BS Asahi, Kansai TV
- Original run: April 7, 2023 – June 23, 2023
- Episodes: 12
- icon

Too Cute Crisis (Japanese: カワイスギクライシス, Hepburn: Kawaisugi Kuraishisu), also known as Cuteness Overload Crisis, is a Japanese manga series written and illustrated by Mitsuru Kido. It has been serialized in Shueisha's Jump Square magazine since October 2019, with its chapters collected into fourteen tankōbon volumes as of October 2026. An anime television series adaptation produced by SynergySP aired from April to June 2023.

== Premise ==
Liza Luna is an alien from the space empire Azatos, an advanced civilization with numerous planets under its control. As a member of the survey team, Liza comes to investigate Earth as a first step to its invasion. At first, she wanted to destroy Earth due to its civilization being at far lower level than hers, but begins to rethink her plan after stopping by a café and encounters a cat, a creature that is "too cute" and could not be found on any other planet in the universe.

== Characters ==
Liza Luna (リザ・ルーナ, Riza Rūna)
Voiced by: Yumiri Hanamori
The protagonist of the series, a girl from the space empire Azatos and a member of its Interstellar Survey Team, Liza wanted to destroy Earth due to its low level of civilization but came to investigate it regardless. On her first day on Earth, she visits a cat café and encounters a cat, a creature that is unknown to her. She is shocked by its "cuteness" and fainted. Afterwards, she deems the cuteness of cats and other animals to be dangerous and decides to settle on Earth in order to study them.
Yozora (よぞら)
Voiced by: Aya Suzaki (vomic), Natsumi Fujiwara (anime)
Liza's cat, a male American Curl who was found abandoned in the rain and taken in by Liza. Yozora was named for his yellow eyes and black body which resemble the stars in the night sky (夜空, yozora). He wants Liza to thoroughly pamper him due to his experience of being abandoned once.
Kasumi Yanagi (矢薙 華澄, Yanagi Kasumi)
Voiced by: Aya Suzaki (vomic), Saya Aizawa (anime)
A waitress working at Nyanday, a cat café where Liza visited when she first came to Earth. She teaches Liza about Earth and often accompanies her when she goes out. Later in the series, she gains the trust of the Interstellar Survey Team's members and is invited to visit their ship. Kasumi has a pet dog named Masamune, a Golden Retriever.
Seiji Mukai (向井 誠二, Mukai Seiji)
Voiced by: Fumiyoshi Shioya (vomic), Jin Ogasawara (anime)
A clerk working at Nyanday who teaches Liza about cats when she first visited the café. Seiji is a cat person and owns a Maine Coon named Emily.
Garmie Lou (ガルミ・ルゥ, Garumi Rū)
Voiced by: Ayasa Itō
A member of the Interstellar Survey Team, Garumi and Rasta first met each other when they were younger and become roommates when they are staying on Earth. She could not compose herself when she sees cute animals but gradually improves after spending time on Earth. After seeing the relationship between Liza and Yozora, she decides to adopt a pet herself and receives a rabbit named Hinata from Melhelm, a rabbit café.
Luster Cole (ラスタ・コール, Rasuta Kōru)
Voiced by: Yume Miyamoto
A member of the Interstellar Survey Team. He is allergic to cats and rabbits.
Amat Roy (アマト・ロイ, Amato Roi)
Voiced by: Atsushi Kousaka (vomic), Yuichi Nakamura (anime)
The vice-captain of the ship belonging to the Interstellar Survey Team. He and Liza have a siblings-like relationship since when they were young and has absolute trust in her. For a while, he thinks that cats are terrifying creatures based on the information he receives from Liza. After the misunderstanding is cleared up, he comes to like cat products which Liza brings back from Earth and decorates them in his room.
Fianna Tierley (フィアナ・ティアリー, Fiana Tiarī)
Voiced by: Riho Sugiyama (vomic), Reina Kondō (anime)
A member of the Interstellar Survey Team who serves as a director of communications, Fianna is a language specialist and was able to translate the languages of Earth in a week. Having been captivated by cats after seeing Yozora, she suggests the team to keep an animal from Earth on the ship and later receives a Pomeranian dog named Riku as a pet.
Sasara Azuma (亜妻 ささら, Azuma Sasara)
Voiced by: Miyu Tomita
A junior high school student who is not afraid of aliens or space creatures. Her pet is a hedgehog named Negimaru.
Mitsuhiko Azuma (亜妻 光彦, Azuma Mitsuhiko)
Voiced by: Hikaru Midorikawa
Sasara's grandfather. He has a pet hamster named Mitsuro.
Mikitty Fulpulring (ミキティ・フルプルリン, Mikiti Furupururin)
Voiced by: Kenichi Ogata
Shamil Naga (シャミル・ナーガ, Shamiru Nāga)
Voiced by: Takehito Koyasu
Mithra Lir (ミトラ・リル, Mitora Riru)
Voiced by: Kyōka Moriya
Komachi Kokage (狐陰 小町, Kokage Komachi)
Voiced by: Reina Ueda
Nazuna Endō (猿藤 七絆, Endō Nazuna)
Voiced by: Nene Hieda

== Media ==
=== Manga ===
Written and illustrated by Mitsuru Kido, Too Cute Crisis began serialization in Shueisha's Jump Square magazine on October 4, 2019. The first tankōbon volume was released on April 3, 2020. Four voiced comic videos were released on Jump Square's official YouTube channel between July and October 2021 to promote the series, featuring Yumiri Hanamori as Liza Luna. As of October 2026, fourteen volumes have been released. In 2026, the series became licensed digitally in English on Shueisha's Manga Million platform.

==== Volumes ====
No.	Japanese release date	Japanese ISBN
1	April 3, 2020	978-4-08-882262-4
2	October 2, 2020	978-4-08-882442-0
3	April 2, 2021	978-4-08-882605-9
4	October 4, 2021	978-4-08-882811-4
5	April 4, 2022	978-4-08-883084-1
6	October 4, 2022	978-4-08-883265-4
7	April 4, 2023	978-4-08-883457-3
8	October 4, 2023	978-4-08-883672-0
9	April 4, 2024	978-4-08-883892-2
10	October 4, 2024	978-4-08-884214-1
11	April 4, 2025	978-4-08-884462-6
12	October 3, 2025	978-4-08-884698-9
13	April 3, 2026	978-4-08-885003-0
14	October 2, 2026	978-4-08-885211-9

=== Anime ===
An anime television series adaptation produced by SynergySP was announced on September 27, 2022. The series is directed by Jun Hatori, with scripts written by Aya Satsuki, character designs handled by Mayumi Watanabe, music composed by Shun Narita and Yūsuke Seo, and Yumiri Hanamori respiring her role as Liza Luna. It aired from April 7 to June 23, 2023, on Tokyo MX and other networks. The opening theme song is "Space Cat Big Bang" (スペースキャットビッグバン) by Chogakusei, and the ending theme is "Nyanbori de Moffi!!" (にゃんぼりーdeモッフィー!!) by Dialogue+. Sentai Filmworks licensed the series for streaming on Hidive.

==== Episodes ====
No.	Title	Directed by (Note: Information is taken from the ending credits of each episode.)	Written by	Storyboarded by	Original release date
1	"Impossible"; Transliteration: "Arienai" (Japanese: アリエナイ)	Shūji Saitō	Aya Satsuki	Jun Hatori	April 7, 2023
2	"Trapped"; Transliteration: "Derarenai" (Japanese: デラレナイ)	Hideki Takayama	Aya Satsuki	Kunihisa Sugishima	April 14, 2023
3	"No Surrender"; Transliteration: "Yuzuranai" (Japanese: ユズラナイ)	Mayu Numayama	Aya Satsuki	Jun Hatori	April 21, 2023
4	"Unknown"; Transliteration: "Wakaranai" (Japanese: ワカラナイ)	Takatoshi Suzuki	Aya Satsuki	Hitoyuki Matsui	April 28, 2023
5	"Favorite"; Transliteration: "Okinimesu" (Japanese: オキニメス)	Taiki Nishimura	Tsubasa Akanomiya	Kunihisa Sugishima	May 5, 2023
6	"Capyba-Llama"; Transliteration: "Kapibarama" (Japanese: カピバラマ)	Hideki Takayama	Aya Satsuki	Jun Hatori	May 12, 2023
7	"Return to Base"; Transliteration: "Kikanseyo" (Japanese: キカンセヨ)	Yasuaki Fujii	Aya Satsuki	Ken'ichi Nishida	May 19, 2023
8	"Fateful Encounter"; Transliteration: "Meguriai" (Japanese: メグリアイ)	Shūji Saitō	Aya Satsuki	Hitoyuki Matsui	May 26, 2023
9	"Outcast"; Transliteration: "Hikagemono" (Japanese: ヒカゲモノ)	Taiki Nishimura	Aya Satsuki	Kunihisa Sugishima	June 2, 2023
10	"Trending"; Transliteration: "Daininki" (Japanese: ダイニンキ)	Ryō Ōkubo	Tsubasa Akanomiya	Hitoyuki Matsui	June 9, 2023
11	"Warriors"; Transliteration: "Senshi-tachi" (Japanese: センシタチ)	Ken'ichi Nishida	Aya Satsuki	Hitoyuki Matsui	June 16, 2023
12	"Too Cute"; Transliteration: "Kawaisugi" (Japanese: カワイスギ)	Takatoshi Suzuki	Aya Satsuki	Jun Hatori	June 23, 2023

== Reception ==
In 2020, the manga was one of the 50 nominees for the 6th Next Manga Awards in the print category.

Anime News Network had three editors review the first episode of the anime: Nicholas Dupree felt the premise and art style was more suited for a five-to-ten minute short than a 22-minute episode but found enjoyment in the various cat drawings throughout the runtime, saying "I don't regret watching this premiere, but I also probably won't remember it." Rebecca Silverman was positive towards Liza Luna during her adventures on Earth but was critical of the art not displaying her "intense cuteness" properly and the plot lacking enough substance to fill the half-hour runtime, saying "This really would have worked better as half-length episodes because the good moments get lost in the drawn-out nature of the whole." Richard Eisenbeis felt the show had a decent sci-fi premise and its singular joke was good for one episode but felt that for 12 episodes it will follow a stretched and worn out pattern, hoping that additional characters and newly told stories will inject some fresh humor into the plot. Silverman reviewed the complete anime series and gave it a C+ grade. She commended the show for capturing the "joys and anxieties of being a pet parent" but criticized the lackluster art and animation, overdone jokes and the story being unable to keep viewers past the three-quarters mark of its full-length run, concluding that "if you can get past the lackluster visuals and discombobulated start, Too Cute Crisis confirms what many of us already know: that pets truly may save the world."
