= Yurina =

- Gender: Female

Origin
- Origin: Japanese
- Meaning: Lily

Other names
- Related names: Yuri

Yurina (Japanese: ゆりな) is a feminine given name of Japanese origin.

- Yurina Hase (born 1979), Japanese voice actress
- Yurina Hiraka (born 1991), Japanese long jumper
- Yurina Hirate (born 2001), Japanese idol singer (Keyakizaka46)
- Yurina Kumai (born 1993), Japanese idol singer (Berryz Kobo)
- Yurina Uchiyama (born 1998), Japanese voice actress
- Yurina Yamada (born 1996), Japanese ski jumper
- Yurina Kawaguchi (born 1999), Japanese contestant on the South Korean survival show Girls Planet 999

== See also ==
- Ludmila Yurina (born 1962), Ukrainian pianist and composer
