= Mayu Iizuka =

Japanese voice actress and singer

- 飯塚 麻結
- Born: 15 April 1996 (age 30); Saitama Prefecture, Japan
- Occupation: Voice actress
- Years active: 2012–present
- Employer: Sun Music Group
- Notable work: Million Doll as Rina; Cue! as Airi Eniwa; Sentenced to Be a Hero as Teoritta
- Musical career
- Member of: Dialogue

Mayu Iizuka (Japanese: 飯塚 麻結, Hepburn: Iizuka Mayu; born 15 April 1996) is a Japanese voice actress from Saitama Prefecture, affiliated with Sun Music Group. A founding member of the voice acting unit Dialogue, she is known for voicing Rina in Million Doll, Airi Eniwa in Cue! and Teoritta in Sentenced to Be a Hero.

== Biography ==
Mayu Iizuka, a native of Saitama Prefecture, was born on 15 April 1996. While watching The Prince of Tennis anime with her older siblings, whom she described in an interview as being "from the Prince of Tennis generation", she saw that a woman was credited for a male character, and her sister told her that female voice actors are able to do characters regardless of gender, inspiring her to join the voice acting industry. She was educated at Clark Memorial International High School, where she would about three hours commuting back and forth to and where she started an idol club.

Her voice acting career began while she was a first-year high school student. In December 2014, it was announced that she and Aya Uchida would voice the kōhai in Tamayura: Sotsugyō Shashin. In April 2015, she was cast as Rina in Million Doll.

She voices Airi Eniwa in the mobile game Cue!. She reprised her role in the 2022 anime.

In 2019, she became one of the founding members of the voice acting unit Dialogue.

On 29 January 2022, she revealed that she was the "inner person" behind Yume Kotobuki (琴吹 ゆめ, Kotobuki Yume), a VTuber who became active in 2018. Iizuka said that this decision was to counter the stigma of self-revealing real-life identities among VTubers.

Her special skills are winking, whistling, and making her soft joints flexible. Among her hobbies are farming and bass guitar.

== Filmography ==
=== Anime series ===
Year	Title	Role	Ref.
2012	Chitose Get You!!	female student	
2012	From the New World	Bakenezumi	
2013	Amnesia	fan club #2	
2013	Freezing Vibration	Anna Barker	
2013	Recorder and Randsell	Kawauchi-san	
2013	Uta no Prince-sama Maji Love 2000%	girl, child	
2013	Photo Kano		
2014	Glasslip		
2014	Sakura Trick	Akane Niimura	
2014	Denkigai no Honya-san	Umanami-chan, Onomi-chan	
2014	The Kawai Complex Guide to Manors and Hostel Behavior	Chinatsu's friend B	
2014	Magical Warfare		
2015	Gon	Kumarin	
2015	Million Doll	Rina	
2016	And You Thought There Is Never a Girl Online?	Mizuki Nishimura, students, maid B	
2018	Last Period	#8 Walkure	
2018	Game Maniacs	Maniacs Girl	
2022	Cue!	Airi Eniwa	
2026	Hell Mode	Krena	
2026	Sentenced to Be a Hero	Teoritta	

=== Anime films ===
Year	Title	Role	Ref.
2015–2016	Tamayura: Sotsugyō Shashin	Zuzune Maekawa	

=== Video games ===
Year	Title	Role	Ref.
2013	Kaizoku Fantasia	Sena Altas, Anri, etc.	
2014	Heroes Placement	Yōko Shinonome, Hisaka Haeda, Mishio Sakaide	
2014	Under Night In-Birth	Nanase	
2015	Racing Musume	Chieri Yokohama	
2016	Koku no Ishtaria	Grania, Simkiel	
2016	Last Period	Walkure	
