= Dialogue (group) =

Japanese idol group

Dialogue+
- Genres: J-pop; anime song
- Years active: 2019–present
- Label: Pony Canyon
- Members: Yurina Uchiyama; Nene Hieda; Kyōka Moriya; Yuna Ogata; Ayaka Takamura; Satsuki Miyahara; Mayu Iizuka; Manatsu Murakami
- Website: www.dialogue-music.jp

Dialogue (stylized as DIALOGUE+) is a Japanese idol group which is signed to Pony Canyon. The group, consisting of eight voice actresses, debuted in 2019 with the release of their first single "Hajimete no Kakumei", the title track of which was used as the opening theme of the anime television series High School Prodigies Have It Easy Even In Another World. Their music has also been used in Bottom-tier Character Tomozaki and Higehiro.

== History ==
Dialogue began its activities in 2019. It is composed of eight members: Yurina Uchiyama, Nene Hieda, Kyōka Moriya, Yuna Ogata, Ayaka Takamura, Satsuki Miyahara, Mayu Iizuka, and Manatsu Murakami, all of whom were also cast in the mobile game CUE!. The group's first single, "Hajimete no Kakumei!" (はじめてのかくめい) was released on October 23, 2019; the title song, which was written and composed by Unison Square Garden member Tomoya Tabuchi and arranged by Hidekazu Tanaka, was used as the opening theme of the anime television series High School Prodigies Have It Easy Even In Another World. They then released the mini-album Dreamy-Logue on April 8, 2020. They released two singles on February 3, 2021: "Jinsei Easy" (人生イージー, Jinsei Ījī) and "Ayafuwa Asterisk" (あやふわアスタリスク, Ayafuwa Asuterisuku), the title tracks of which are used as the opening and ending themes respectively of the anime series Bottom-tier Character Tomozaki. They also performed the opening theme of the anime series Higehiro and My Stepmom's Daughter Is My Ex. They also performed the ending theme of the anime series Skeleton Knight in Another World and Love After World Domination.

Their first album, Dialogue+1, was released on September 1, 2021. Their second album, Dialogue+2, was released on February 22, 2023.

Their third studio album, titled Dialogue+3 was released on September 18, 2024.

== Members ==
- Yurina Uchiyama (内山 悠里菜, Uchiyama Yurina; born April 28, 1998)
- Nene Hieda (稗田 寧々, Hieda Nene; born January 15, 1997)
- Kyōka Moriya (守屋 亨香, Moriya Kyōka; born May 22, 1995)
- Yuna Ogata (緒方 佑奈, Ogata Yūna; born July 31, 1997)
- Ayaka Takamura (鷹村 彩花, Takamura Ayaka; born February 5, 1998)
- Satsuki Miyahara (宮原 颯希, Miyahara Satsuki; born October 28, 1998)
- Mayu Iizuka (飯塚 麻結, Īzuka Mayu; born April 15, 1996)
- Manatsu Murakami (村上 まなつ, Murakami Manatsu; born August 24, 1999)

== Discography ==
=== Studio albums ===
| Title | Peak Oricon position |
|---|---|
| Dialogue+1: Release date: September 1, 2021 | 6 |
| Dialogue+2: Release date: February 22, 2023 | 9 |
| Dialogue+3: Release date: September 18, 2024 | 16 |
| Novel+: Release date: December 23, 2024 | — |

=== Mini-albums ===
| Title | Peak Oricon position |
|---|---|
| Dreamy-Logue: Release date: April 8, 2020 | 14 |
| Penta+Logue: Release date: September 17, 2025 | 22 |

=== Singles ===
| Title | Peak Oricon position |
|---|---|
| "Hajimete no Kakumei!" (はじめてのかくめい): Release date: October 23, 2019 | 37 |
| "Jinsei Easy" (人生イージー, Jinsei Ījī): Release date: February 3, 2021 | 20 |
| "Ayafuwa Asterisk" (あやふわアスタリスク, Ayafuwa Asuterisuku): Release date: February 3, 2021 | 22 |
| "Omoide Shiritori" (おもいでしりとり): Release date: May 19, 2021 | 11 |
| "Who Called Us Fools?" (僕らが愚かだなんて誰が言った, Bokura ga Oroka da Nante Dare ga Itta): Release date: April 13, 2022 | 13 |
| "Love With the World Theorem" (恋は世界定理と共に, Koi wa Sekai Teiri to Tomo ni): Release date: June 15, 2022 | 12 |
| "Deneb and Spica" (デネブとスピカ, Denebu to Supika): Release date: August 24, 2022 | 11 |
| "Vague and Definite" (かすかでたしか, Kasuka de Tashika): Release date: March 22, 2023 | 17 |
| "Nyanboree de Moffee!" (にゃんぼりーdeモッフィー!!, Nyanbori de Moffi!!): Release date: June 21, 2023 | 10 |
| "Easy? Hard? But Let's Move On!" (イージー？ハード？しかして進めっ！, Ījī? Hādo? Shikashite Susume!): Release date: January 24, 2024 | 13 |
| "Introduction to Utopian Studies" (a.k.a. Introduction to Utopia) (ユートピア学概論, Utopia Gaku-Gairon): Release date: April 24, 2024 | 20 |
| "TREASURE!" (トレジャー): Release date: January 29, 2025 | 12 |
| "Alibi Courtesy" (アリバイなカーテシー, Aribai na Kāteshī): Release date: March 5, 2025 | 16 |
| "Miracles don't happen" (奇跡は起きない, Kiseki wa Okinai): Release date: April 22, 2026 | 21 |
