= Alex Hom =

American voice actor

- Occupation: Voice actor
- Website: alexhomvo.wixsite.com/site

Alex Hom is an American voice actor. Notable performances include Rensuke Kunigami in Blue Lock and Gaoshun in The Apothecary Diaries.

== Anime ==
List of voice performances in anime
Year	Title	Role	Notes	Source
2009	Natsume's Book of Friends	Yōkai		
2021	Higehiro: After Being Rejected, I Shaved and Took in a High School Runaway	Yoshida		
2022	Trapped in a Dating Sim: The World of Otome Games Is Tough for Mobs	Daniel Fou Durland		
2022	Skeleton Knight in Another World	Tryton Du Diento		
2022	The Greatest Demon Lord Is Reborn as a Typical Nobody	Borgan		
2022	Parallel World Pharmacy	Pierre		
2022	More Than a Married Couple, But Not Lovers	Gym Teacher		
2022	Mobile Suit Gundam: The Witch from Mercury	Yamaoke		
2022	New Gods: Yang Jian	Mo Lihai		
2022	Blue Lock	Rensuke Kunigami		
2023	Ayaka: A Story of Bonds and Wounds	Aka Ibuki		
2023	The Iceblade Sorcerer Shall Rule the World	Derek		
2023	KamiKatsu: Working for God in a Godless World	Ricky		
2023	Reign of the Seven Spellblades	Gwyn Sherwood		
2023	Bucchigiri?!	Nagare Jabashiri		
2023	Shangri-La Frontier	Ketchum		
2023	The Great Cleric	Bottaculli		
2023	The Apothecary Diaries	Gaoshun		
2024	The Unwanted Undead Adventurer	Rentt Faina		
2024	Blue Lock: Episode Nagi	Rensuke Kunigami		
2024	Wind Breaker	Yukinari Arima		
2025	The Apothecary Diaries Season 2	Gaoshun		
2025	To Be Hero X	Jam		
2025	Chainsaw Man – The Movie: Reze Arc	Division 2 Vice Captain		
2025	May I Ask for One Final Thing?	Leonardo el Vandimion		
2026	Witch Hat Atelier	Dagda		
