= Million Doll =

Japanese manga and anime series

- Cover of the first tankōbon volume released by Earth Star Entertainment

ミリオンドール (Mirion Dōru)
- Manga
- Written by: Ai
- Published by: Comic Smart (webcomic); Earth Star Entertainment (print)
- Imprint: Earth Star Comics
- Magazine: Ganma! (webcomic); Comic Earth Star (print)
- Original run: December 11, 2013 – November 5, 2016
- Volumes: 2
- Anime television series
- Directed by: Keiichiro Kawaguchi (1); Tomio Yamauchi (6–12)
- Written by: Momoko Murakami
- Studio: Asahi Production
- Licensed by: Crunchyroll
- Original network: Tokyo MX, Sun TV, AT-X
- Original run: July 6, 2015 – September 21, 2015
- Episodes: 12

Million Doll (ミリオンドール, Mirion Dōru) is a Japanese web manga written and illustrated by Ai. It began serialization on Comic Smart's free manga website Ganma! in December 2013 and has since been collected into two tankōbon volumes. An anime television series adaptation by Asahi Production aired from July to September 2015.

== Plot ==
Sūko is an idol-loving shut-in who uses the power of the internet to make relatively unknown idols popular. Ryū-san, on the other hand, is a passionate idol otaku who always attends performances by whoever his favorite artist of the moment is. Sūko uses her prowess to popularise the local idol group, Itorio, while Ryū-san focuses his support on the underground idol, Mariko. The competitiveness of these two otakus to promote their respective idols to stardom changes their careers forever.

== Characters ==
=== Idol fanatics ===
Sūko (すう子)
Voiced by: Aina Kusuda
The main protagonist. An idol-loving hikikomori (shut-in) who has the ability to make any idol popular through the power of blogging. Having visited one of Itorio's live performances, she decides to use her blog to give them a boost in popularity.
Ryū-san (リュウサン)
Voiced by: Yuichiro Umehara
A wota who constantly attends live performances of his favorite idols. He is often described as a DD (short for daredemo daisuki (誰でも大好き, "would like anyone"), having stopped following Itorio as he thought they would go out of fashion, but has lately focused his attention on supporting Mariko.
Kazuto (かずと)
Kanata (カナタ)
Yuki (ゆき)

=== Idols ===
Mariko (マリ子)
Voiced by: Miku Itō
An underground idol who lives with her single mother. Spurred on by Ryū-san and the rest of her fans, Mariko is extremity talented and sets her sights on stardom, but struggles with obtaining popularity in comparison to Itorio.
Itorio (イトリオ)
A group of local idols from the Fukuoka Prefecture, who rise to stardom thanks to Sūko's blog.

Momona (もも菜)
Voiced by: Yui Watanabe
Yurino (ゆりの)
Voiced by: Eriko Matsui
Rina (りな)
Voiced by: Mayu Iizuka

Hinami Kamakura (鎌倉ひなみ, Kamakura Hinami)
Voiced by: Aya Uchida
She is the reason why Sūko and Ryū-san became idol fan. Became famous thanks to their support and ranked No. 1 right after her major debut.
Sorayama (空山)
An idol from the same agency as Mariko.

=== Others ===
Kaede (楓)
Sūko's younger sister, who often worries about her hikkikomori behavior.
Tooru Shirasawa (白澤トオル, Shirasawa Tooru)
The manager of CSM Records.

== Media ==
=== Manga ===
Million Doll began as a web manga written and illustrated by Ai. It was first serialized on Comic Smart's free manga website Ganma! with its first chapter being published in December 2013. Comic Earth Star published the first two tankōbon volumes on June 26, 2015.

=== Anime ===
An anime adaptation produced by Asahi Production was announced in the March 2015 issue of Newtype magazine. The adaptation is directed by Keiichiro Kawaguchi (episode 1) and Tomio Yamauchi (episodes 6 through 12) and written by Momoko Murakami, with a series premiere on July 6, 2015. Crunchyroll streamed the series.

==== Episode list ====
No.	Title	Original release date
1	"Stay-at-Home Otaku vs. On-Site Otaku" "Zaitaku Wota VS Genba Wota" (在宅ヲタVS現場ヲタ)	July 6, 2015
Shut-in blogger Sūko attends a live performance by local idols from the Fukuoka Prefecture, Itorio. While enjoying their performance, Sūko is not so pleased with the wotas supporting them, namely an otaku named Ryū-san who decides to stop supporting Itorio and move onto another idol, Mariko. Refusing to let this stand, Sūko uses her top-ranked blog to spread word of Itorio's performance across the internet.
2	"The one who gave Hinami a major was..." "Hinami o Mejā ni ageta no wa..." (ひなみをメジャーにあげたのは…)	July 13, 2015
Hearing how Itorio has gained popularity thanks to Suko's blog, Ryū-san urges Mariko to make her major debut.
3	"Underground Idols & Local Idols" "Chika Aidoru to Gotōji Aidoru" (地下アイドルとご当地アイドル)	July 20, 2015
4	"Sūko's Awakening" "Sūko no Kakusei" (すう子の覚醒)	July 27, 2015
5	"Itorio's First Solo Concert" "Irotio, Hatsu Wanman" (イトリオ、初ワンマン!)	August 3, 2015
6	"Each Melancholy" "Sorezore no Yūutsu" (それぞれの憂鬱)	August 17, 2015
7	"Go Ahead! Sūko-kai" "Susume! Sūko-kai" (進め!すう子会)	August 24, 2015
8	"Yurino's True Feelings" "Yurino no Honne" (ゆりのの本音)	August 31, 2015
9	"Mariko's Situation" "Mariko no Jijō" (マリ子の事情)	September 7, 2015
10	"I Want to go Even Higher" "Motto, Ue ni Ikitai" (もっと、上に行きたい)	September 14, 2015
11	"Aim for a Major Debut" "Mesaze, Mejā Debyū" (目指せ、メジャーデビュー!)	September 21, 2015
