= Yu-Gi-Oh! Card Game The Chronicles =

Japanese original net animation series

- Created by: Kazuki Takahashi; Konami
- Original net animation

Yu-Gi-Oh! Card Game The Chronicles
- Directed by: Atsushi Tsujimoto; Hissei Aoi; Junya Tanaka; Ken Takahashi; Seiya Miyajima; Yuto Nakawada
- Music by: Noriyuki Asakura; Shiho Terada; Shinkichi Mitsumune
- Studio: Konami Animation
- Released: February 3, 2024
- Runtime: 30-60 seconds
- Episodes: 9
- Original net animation

Yu-Gi-Oh! Card Game The Chronicles
- Directed by: Seiya Miyajima (eps 1-2); Yūki Ogawa (eps 3-8); Atsushi Nakagawa (eps 9-12); Yūya Horiuchi (eps 13-16); Kyōsuke Takada (eps 17, 18)
- Produced by: Naohiko Furuichi
- Written by: Mitsutaka Echigo; Ryōta Suzuki (eps 1-4, 7); Yūji Kobayashi (ep 5-8, 17, 18); Rei Kodama (eps 9-12); Daisuke Oohigashi (eps 13-16)
- Music by: Noriyuki Asakura; Shiho Terada; Shinkichi Mitsumune
- Studio: Konami Animation
- Released: April 22, 2025 – present
- Runtime: 2–10 minutes
- Episodes: 20

Yu-Gi-Oh! Card Game The Chronicles (stylized in all caps) is a Japanese original net animation (ONA) series produced and animated by Konami Animation. It is a spinoff of Yu-Gi-Oh! which adapts stories from the Yu-Gi-Oh! Trading Card Game.

== Production ==
On 3 February 2024, Konami announced the establishment of an in-house animation studio, titled Konami Animation. In the same announcement, Yu-Gi-Oh! Card Game The Chronicles debuted, produced by the studio, which would adapt stories from the Yu-Gi-Oh! Trading Card Game. In May 2024, Konami put out a survey to determine the future of the series.

On 20 December 2024, Konami announced a new series, also titled Yu-Gi-Oh! Card Game The Chronicles, which was planned to adapt stories from the Yu-Gi-Oh! Trading Card Game across multiple episodes, featuring longer episodes and multi-episode arcs. Two arcs were initially announced, focusing on the Sky Striker and Branded card storylines. On 31 August 2025, a new arc was announced, which would focus on the Spirit Charmer card storyline. On 20 December, it was announced that it would be followed by the Magistus arc. On 22 June 2026, it was announced that the next arc would be the Seeker of Sinful Spoils storyline. On 6 September, it was announced the next arc would focus on the Evil★Twin storyline.

== Characters ==
=== Sky Striker Ace arc ===
- Raye
  - Voiced by: Nene Hieda
- Roze
  - Voiced by: Anna Nagase

=== The Fallen & The Virtuous arc ===
- Ecclesia
  - Voiced by: Kana Ichinose
- Albaz
  - Voiced by: Koki Uchiyama
- Fleurdelis
  - Voiced by: Miyuki Sawashiro
- Dogmatika Maximus
  - Voiced by: Takehito Koyasu
- Dogmatika Ashiyan
  - Voiced by: Show Hayami
- Shuraig
  - Voiced by: Yūichirō Umehara
- Ferrijit
  - Voiced by: Marina Inoue
- Rugal
  - Voiced by: Hiroki Yasumoto
- Kitt
  - Voiced by: Yū Serizawa
- Sargas
  - Voiced by: Kenta Miyake
- Rockey
  - Voiced by: Chinatsu Akasaki

=== Spirit Charmers arc ===
- Eria
  - Voiced by: Akari Kitō
- Hiita
  - Voiced by: Haruka Shiraishi
- Wynn
  - Voiced by: Yurika Kubo
- Aussa
  - Voiced by: Mikako Komatsu

=== Magistus Arc ===
- Aleister
  - Voiced by: Natsuki Hanae
- Beast Tamer
  - Voiced by: Kaito Ishikawa
- Endymion
  - Voiced by: Shunsuke Takeuchi
- Artemis
  - Voiced by: Ai Kayano
- Verre (Rilliona)
  - Voiced by: Aoi Yūki
- Haine
  - Voiced by: Saori Hayami
- Schietta
  - Voiced by: Lynn
- Genni
  - Voiced by: Rumi Okubo
- Edel
  - Voiced by: Yūko Natsuyoshi
- Pittore
  - Voiced by: Nanami Yamashita
- Zoroa
  - Voiced by: Daisuke Ono

=== Seeker of Sinful Spoils ===
- Diabellstar
  - Voiced by: Asami Seto
- Diabellze
  - Voiced by: Reina Ueda
- Poplar
  - Voiced by: Misaki Kuno
- Gabonga
  - Voiced by: Shigeru Chiba
- Rucia
  - Voiced by: Yumi Uchiyama
- Silvy
  - Voiced by: Ai Kakuma
- Diabel
  - Voiced by: Ayumi Tsunematsu
- Azamina
  - Voiced by: Shizuka Itō
- Rcielago
  - Voiced by: Yumi Uchiyama
- Silvia
  - Voiced by: Ai Kakuma
- Morgana
  - Voiced by: Marie Ooi

=== Evil★Twin ===
- Ki-sikil
  - Voiced by: Shion Wakayama
- Lil-la:
  - Voiced by: Hina Yomiya

== Episodes ==
=== Yu-Gi-Oh! Card Game The Chronicles (2024) ===
No.	Title	Original release date
0	"Yu-Gi-Oh! Card Game The Chronicles"	February 3, 2023
1	"Maiden with Eyes of Blue and Azure-Eyes Silver Dragon" (青き眼の乙女と蒼眼の銀龍)	February 3, 2023
2	"The Spirit Charmers" (精霊術の使い手たち)	February 3, 2023
3	"The Third Ice Dragon, Trishula Unleashed" (第三の氷龍トリシューラ封印開放)	February 3, 2023
4	"Melffys of the Joyous Forest" (わくわく森のメルフィーズ)	February 3, 2023
5	"The Divine Arsenal AA-Zeus - Sky Thunder" (神をも殺す最終兵器、天霆號アーゼウス)	February 3, 2023
6	"The Legendary Six Samurai!" (真六武衆見参!)	February 3, 2023
7	"Live☆Twin is... Evil★Twin?" (Live☆TwinはEvil★Twin？)	February 3, 2023
8	"Fallen of Albaz" (アルバスの落胤)	February 3, 2023

=== Yu-Gi-Oh! Card Game The Chronicles (2025) ===
==== Sky Striker Ace arc ====
No.	Title	Original release date
1	"Sky Striker Ace - Raye" (閃刀姫－レイ)	April 21, 2025
2	"Sky Striker Ace - Roze" (閃刀姫－ロゼ)	May 21, 2025

==== The Fallen & The Virtuous arc ====
No.	Title	Original release date
1	"Dogmatika Ecclesia, the Virtuous" (教導の聖女エクレシア)	June 20, 2025
2	"Dogmatika Fleurdelis, the Knighted" (教導の騎士フルルドリス)	July 25, 2025
3	"Tri-Brigade Shuraig the Ominous Omen" (鉄獣戦線 凶鳥のシュライグ)	August 22, 2025
4	"Fallen of Albaz" (アルバスの落胤)	September 19, 2025
5	"Tri-Brigade Kitt" (鉄獣戦線 キット)	August 24, 2025
6	"Albion the Branded Dragon" (烙印竜アルビオン)	November 21, 2025

==== Spirit Charmers arc ====
No.	Title	Original release date
1	"Eria the Water Charmer" (水霊使いエリア)	December 20, 2025
2	"Hiita the Fire Charmer" (火霊使いヒータ)	January 23, 2026
3	"Wynn the Wind Charmer" (風霊使いウィン)	February 20, 2026
4	"Aussa the Earth Charmer" (地霊使いアウス)	March 20, 2026

==== Magistus Arc ====
No.	Title	Original release date
1	"Aleister the Invoker" (召喚師アレイスター)	April 24, 2026
2	"Endymion, the Master Magician" (神聖魔導王 エンディミオン)	May 22, 2026
3	"Witchcrafter Madame Verre" (ウィッチクラフトマスター・ヴェール)	June 19, 2026
4	"Zoroa, the Magistus of Flame" (絶火の大賢者ゾロア)	July 24, 2026

==== Seeker of Sinful Spoils ====
No.	Title	Original release date
1	"Snake-Eyes Poplar" (蛇眼の炎燐)	August 21, 2026
2	"Diabellstar the Black Witch" (黒魔女ディアベルスター)	September 25, 2026
3	"Astellar of the White Forest" (白き森のアステーリャ)	October 23, 2026
4	"Diabellze the Original Sinkeeper" (原罪のディアベルゼ)	November 20, 2026
