= Gods' Games We Play =

Japanese light novel series

- First light novel volume cover

神は遊戯に飢えている。 (Kami wa Gēmu ni Ueteiru)
- Genre: Adventure, fantasy
- Novel series
- Written by: Kei Sazane
- Published by: Kakuyomu
- Original run: September 2020 – present
- Light novel
- Written by: Kei Sazane
- Illustrated by: Toiro Tomose
- Published by: Media Factory
- English publisher: NA: Yen Press
- Imprint: MF Bunko J
- Original run: January 25, 2021 – present
- Volumes: 9
- Manga
- Written by: Kei Sazane
- Illustrated by: Kapiko Toriumi
- Published by: Media Factory
- Magazine: Monthly Comic Alive
- Original run: August 27, 2021 – December 26, 2025
- Volumes: 6
- Anime television series
- Directed by: Tatsuya Shiraishi
- Produced by: Sora Kimura; Keigo Nakamura; Naoto Itami; Tetsurou Satomi; Aya Iizuka; Yukari Kuwayama; Kouichi Sano; Kang Yue; Kouji Sawahara
- Written by: NTL
- Music by: Gin (Busted Rose)
- Studio: Liden Films
- Licensed by: Crunchyroll
- Original network: AT-X, Tokyo MX, SUN, KBS Kyoto, BS NTV
- Original run: April 1, 2024 – June 24, 2024
- Episodes: 13
- icon

Gods' Games We Play (神は遊戯(ゲーム)に飢えている。, Kami wa Gēmu ni Ueteiru; lit. 'God is Hungry for Games') is a Japanese light novel series written by Kei Sazane and illustrated by Toiro Tomose. It began serialization online in September 2020 on Kadokawa's user-generated novel publishing website, Kakuyomu. It was later published by Media Factory, with nine volumes under the MF Bunko J imprint since January 2021. A manga adaptation with art by Kapiko Toriumi was serialized in Media Factory's seinen manga magazine Monthly Comic Alive from August 2021 to December 2025. It has been collected in six tankōbon volumes. An anime television series adaptation produced by Liden Films aired from April to June 2024.

== Premise ==
"Play of the Gods" is the battle of wits created by gods who grow bored and have too much free time. The people who have received Arise, a special power, are known as Apostles, and they are allowed to compete in the "Play of the Gods", if they can achieve ten victories, they will be granted a wish. However, there has yet to be a victor. Leoleshea, a former Goddess, awakes from a long slumber and declares, "Bring forth the person who is the best in this era!" Fay, a human who is currently undefeated, has achieved three straight victories in the game, and who is expected to be the "best rookie in recent years", is nominated. He decides to team up with Leoleshea and take on the "Play of the Gods". Thus, the battle of wits between Fay and Leoleshea begins.

== Characters ==
Fay (フェイ, Fei)
Voiced by: Nobunaga Shimazaki (Japanese); Ryan Negron (English)
Leoleshea (レオレーシェ, Reorēshe)
Voiced by: Akari Kitō (Japanese); Trisha Mellon (English)
Pearl Diamond (パール・ダイアモンド, Pāru Daiamondo)
Voiced by: Hina Tachibana (Japanese); Bryn Apprill (English)
Nel Reckless (ネル・レックレス, Neru Rekkuresu)
Voiced by: Kanna Nakamura (Japanese); Molly Zhang (English)
Miranda (ミランダ)
Voiced by: Ami Koshimizu (Japanese); Molly Searcy (English)
Dax (ダークス, Dākusu)
Voiced by: Kent Itō (Japanese); Jordan Dash Cruz (English)
Kelritch (ケルリッチ, Keruritchi)
Voiced by: Miku Itō
Mysterious Beautiful Girl
Voiced by: Miyu Tomita

== Media ==
=== Light novel ===
Written by Kei Sazane, the series began serialization online in September 2020 on Kadokawa's user-generated novel publishing website, Kakuyomu. It was later published as a light novel with illustrations by Toiro Tomose by Media Factory under their MF Bunko J imprint from January 25, 2021. As of November 2024, nine volumes have been released.

At Sakura-Con 2022, Yen Press announced that they licensed the series for English publication.

No.	Original release date	Original ISBN	English release date	English ISBN
1	January 25, 2021	978-4-04-680165-4	November 22, 2022	978-1-9753-4849-6
2	May 25, 2021	978-4-04-680396-2	June 20, 2023	978-1-9753-4851-9
3	August 25, 2021	978-4-04-680700-7	September 17, 2024	978-1-9753-9482-0
4	January 25, 2022	978-4-04-681098-4	January 21, 2025	979-8-8554-0057-1
5	August 25, 2022	978-4-04-681584-2	July 15, 2025	979-8-8554-0059-5
6	January 25, 2023	978-4-04-682111-9	February 10, 2026	979-8-8554-0741-9
7	July 25, 2023	978-4-04-682664-0	December 8, 2026	979-8-8554-0743-3
8	May 24, 2024	978-4-04-683237-5	—	—
9	November 25, 2024	978-4-04-683916-9	—	—

=== Manga ===
A manga adaptation with art by Kapiko Toriumi was serialized in Media Factory's seinen manga magazine Monthly Comic Alive from August 27, 2021, to December 26, 2025. It has been collected in six tankōbon volumes.

No.	Japanese release date	Japanese ISBN
1	March 23, 2022	978-4-04-681226-1
2	April 21, 2023	978-4-04-682454-7
3	April 23, 2024	978-4-04-683567-3
4	May 23, 2024	978-4-04-683637-3
5	March 22, 2025	978-4-04-684479-8
6	January 23, 2026	—

=== Anime ===
On January 21, 2022, an anime adaptation was announced with a promotional video narrated by Saki Miyashita. On July 24 of the same year, during the "Natsu no Gakuensai 2022" event for MF Bunko J, it was announced that the anime would be a television series produced by Liden Films and directed by Tatsuya Shiraishi, with scripts written by NTL, character designed by Yoshihiro Watanabe, and music composed by Gin from Busted Rose. The series aired from April 1 to June 24, 2024, on AT-X and other networks. The opening theme song is "NewGame", performed by rock band AliA, and the ending theme song is "I'm Game!", performed by Hina Tachibana. Crunchyroll is streaming the series.

==== Episodes ====
No.	Title (Note: All English titles are taken from Crunchyroll.)	Directed by	Storyboarded by	Original release date
1	"Gods' Games We Play"	Takahiro Tanaka; Tatsuya Shiraishi	Tatsuya Shiraishi	April 1, 2024
2	"Hide-and-God-Seek"; Transliteration: "Kamigokko" (Japanese: 神ごっこ)	Jutaro Sekino	Jutaro Sekino	April 8, 2024
3	"I'm Pearl Diamond"; Transliteration: "Pāruda・Diamondo Desu" (Japanese: パール・ダイアモンドです)	Shunji Yoshida	Tatsuya Shiraishi	April 15, 2024
4	"Uroboros"; Transliteration: "Uroborosu" (Japanese: ウロボロス)	Yoshitsugu Kimura	Tatsuya Shiraishi	April 22, 2024
5	"World Games Tour"; Transliteration: "Wārudo Gēmuzu Tsuā" (Japanese: ワールドゲームズツアー)	Asahi Yoshimura	Jutaro Sekino	April 29, 2024
6	"Mind Arena"; Transliteration: "Maindo Arīna" (Japanese: マインドアリーナ)	Koji Aritomi	Tamatsukuri Tamakura	May 6, 2024
7	"Sunsteal Scramble"; Transliteration: "Taiyō Sōdatsu Rirē" (Japanese: 太陽争奪リレー)	Jutaro Sekino	Jutaro Sekino	May 13, 2024
8	"Where has the Sun Gone?"; Transliteration: "Taiyō wa Doko e Kieta？" (Japanese: 太陽はどこへ消えた？)	Shunji Yoshida	Shirono Harada	May 20, 2024
9	"Bookmaker"; Transliteration: "Bukkumēkā" (Japanese: ブックメーカー(賭け神))	Tatsuya Shiraishi	Tatsuya Shiraishi	May 27, 2024
10	"The Three Cheats the God Brings Forth"; Transliteration: "Kami ga Motarasu Mittsu no Ika-sama" (Japanese: 神がもたらす三つのイカサマ)	Wu Yuio; Tatsuya Shiraishi; Yoshitaka Nagaoka	Katsuyuki Kodera	June 3, 2024
11	"The Labyrinth of No Return: Luceimia"; Transliteration: "Kaerazu no "Meikyū" Rusheimea" (Japanese: 帰らずの"迷宮"ルシェイメア)	Yoshitaka Nagaoka	Hiroki Handa	June 10, 2024
12	"The "Labyrinth" of Death and Rebirth: Luceimia"; Transliteration: "Shi to Saisei no "Meikyū" Rusheimea" (Japanese: 死と再生の"冥宮"ルシェイメア)	Koji Aritomi	Katsuyuki Kodera	June 17, 2024
13	"Good Game Well Played"	Jutaro Sekino; Shunji Yoshida; Tatsuya Shiraishi	Jutaro Sekino	June 24, 2024

== Reception ==
In the 2022 edition of Takarajimasha's annual light novel guide book Kono Light Novel ga Sugoi!, the novel series ranked 15th in the bunkobon category, and 9th in the new work category.

== See also ==
- Our Last Crusade or the Rise of a New World – Another light novel series by the same author
- Why Does Nobody Remember Me in This World? – Another light novel series by the same author.
