= Nene Hieda =

Japanese voice actress

- 稗田 寧々
- Born: January 15, 1997 (age 29); Kanagawa Prefecture, Japan
- Occupation: Voice actress
- Years active: 2016–present
- Agent: 81 Produce
- Known for: Gundam Build Divers as Momoka Yashiro; The Misfit of Demon King Academy as Misa Ilioroagu; Warlords of Sigrdrifa as Miyako Muguruma; Bottom-tier Character Tomozaki as Yuzu Izumi

Nene Hieda (稗田 寧々, Hieda Nene; born January 15, 1997) is a Japanese voice actress who is affiliated with 81 Produce. She started her career following her selection as one of the finalists in an audition held by 81 Produce. She is known for her roles as Momoka Yashiro in Gundam Build Divers, Misa Ilioroagu in The Misfit of Demon King Academy, and Miyako Muguruma in Warlords of Sigrdrifa. She is also a member of the idol group Dialogue+.

== Career ==
Hieda was born in Kanagawa Prefecture on January 15, 1997. Her activities as a voice actress began in 2012, when she participated in a voice acting audition held by the talent agency 81 Produce. Out of 1,672 participants, she was selected as one of the 23 finalists, and received a Special Award as well as an award sponsored by the publishing company Shogakukan.

In 2016, Hieda joined 81 Produce. In 2018, she played the role of Momoka Yashiro in the anime series Gundam Build Fighters. That same year, she became part of a 3x3 basketball team for voice actors. In 2019, she became part of the idol group Dialogue+, which is composed of seven other rookie voice actresses; the group's first single "Hajimete no Kakumei!" (はじめてのかくめい!) was released on October 23, 2019, and the title song was used as the opening theme of the anime series High School Prodigies Have It Easy Even In Another World. She also began playing the role of Maika Takatori in the mobile game Cue!, which she reprised in its anime adaptation. In 2020, she was cast as the character Misa Ilioroagu in the anime series The Misfit of Demon King Academy and as Miyako Muguruma in the anime series Warlords of Sigrdrifa. In 2021, she played the role of Yuzu Izumi in Bottom-tier Character Tomozaki, and the lead role of Dōki-chan in Ganbare Dōki-chan. In 2022, Hieda was one of the winners of the Best New Actress Award at the 16th Seiyu Awards.

== Filmography ==
=== Anime series ===
Year	Title	Role
2018	Pop Team Epic	Girlfriend (episode 6)
2018	Yowamushi Pedal Glory Line	Female student (episode 10)
2018	Gundam Build Divers	Momoka Yashiro
2018	Real Girl	Female student (episode 6)
2018	Kiratto Pri Chan	Amechans
2018	How Not to Summon a Demon Lord	Friend (episode 7)
2018	Layton Mystery Tanteisha: Katori no Nazotoki File	Nero (young, episode 21)
2019	Kakegurui – Compulsive Gambler	Vice Chairman of Election Administration, Gal student B (episode 9)
2019	We Never Learn	Schoolgirl A, Schoolgirl B
2019	Wasteful Days of High School Girls	Boy (episode 3)
2019	Mix: Meisei Story	Female student C (episode 16)
2020	22/7	Student (episode 11)
2020	The Misfit of Demon King Academy	Misa Ilioroagu
2020	Warlords of Sigrdrifa	Miyako Muguruma
2021	Bottom-tier Character Tomozaki	Yuzu Izumi
2022	Cue!	Maika Takatori
2022	Skeleton Knight in Another World	Ponta
2022	Love After World Domination	Misaki Jingūji
2023	The Reincarnation of the Strongest Exorcist in Another World	Amu
2023	Ippon Again!	Anna Nagumo
2023	Too Cute Crisis	Nazuna Endō
2023	Classroom for Heroes	Cinq
2024	Bottom-tier Character Tomozaki 2nd Stage	Yuzu Izumi
2024	Chained Soldier	Yachiho Azuma
2024	Chillin' in Another World with Level 2 Super Cheat Powers	Belano
2024	Re:Monster	Rubilia
2024	Kaiju No. 8	Akari Minase
2025	Headhunted to Another World: From Salaryman to Big Four!	Genome
2025	I Got Married to the Girl I Hate Most in Class	Shisei Hojo
2025	I Left My A-Rank Party to Help My Former Students Reach the Dungeon Depths!	Rain
2025	Possibly the Greatest Alchemist of All Time	Reyva
2025	Summer Pockets	Kamome Kushima
2026	Kirio Fan Club	Aimi Miyoshi
2026	Kujima: Why Sing, When You Can Warble?	Makoto Mitsuki
2026	Hanaori-san Still Wants to Fight in the Next Life	Minto Takigawa
2026	Tetsuryō! Meet with Tetsudō Musume	Konomi Shibaguchi
2027	My Crush's Crush	Miya Fuwa

=== Original net animation ===
Year	Title	Role
2021	Ganbare Dōki-chan	Dōki-chan
2025	Yu-Gi-Oh! Card Game: The Chronicles	Roze

=== Video games ===
Year	Title	Role
2017	Azur Lane	KMS Elbe
2017	Mobile Legends: Bang Bang	Layla
2017	Grand Summoners	Riffily, Catemira
2017	Shirohime Quest	Yamajō Akutagawa
2017	Shinyaku Arcana Slayer	Kanami
2017	Destiny of Crown	Masamune
2019	Cue!	Maika Takatori
2020	Last Period	Lulu
2020	Shinobi Master Senran Kagura: New Link	Ranmaru
2020	Sakura Kakumei: Hanasaku Otome-tachi	Kyōko Toribe
2022	Heaven Burns Red	Adelheid Kanzaki

=== Live-action film ===
Year	Title	Role
2025	Nemurubaka: Hypnic Jerks	family restaurant clerk
