= Sentenced to Be a Hero =

Japanese light novel series

- Sentenced to Be a Hero: The Prison Records of Penal Hero Unit 9004
- Fifth light novel volume cover, featuring the main characters Xylo Forbartz (center) and Teoritta (left)

勇者刑に処す 懲罰勇者9004隊刑務記録 (Yūsha-kei ni Shosu: Chōbatsu Yūsha Kyūmarumaruyon-tai Keimu Kiroku)
- Genre: Adventure; Dark fantasy
- Novel series
- Written by: Rocket Shōkai
- Published by: Kakuyomu
- Original run: October 28, 2020 – present
- Light novel
- Written by: Rocket Shōkai
- Illustrated by: Mephisto
- Published by: ASCII Media Works
- English publisher: NA: Yen Press
- Imprint: Dengeki no Shin Bungei
- Original run: September 17, 2021 – present
- Volumes: 9
- Manga
- Written by: Rocket Shōkai
- Illustrated by: Natsumi Inoue
- Published by: ASCII Media Works
- English publisher: NA: Yen Press Kadokawa Corporation (digital)
- Imprint: Dengeki Comics Next
- Magazine: Dengeki Comic Regulus
- Original run: March 25, 2022 – present
- Volumes: 3
- Anime television series
- Directed by: Hiroyuki Takashima
- Produced by: Naoto Setoguchi; Tatsuya Funatsu; Jong-yeop Ra; Kouichi Sano; Hirokuni Taniguchi
- Written by: Kenta Ihara
- Music by: Shunsuke Takizawa
- Studio: Studio Kai
- Licensed by: Crunchyroll; SEA: Medialink
- Original network: Tokyo MX, Kansai TV, BS NTV, AT-X, TUF, NBS, Miyatele, RBC, TSS, AAB, RAB, RKB, NIB, TUT, SUT, OBS, Nagoya TV, tys, IBC, JRT, BSN, itv, UTY, TUY, Fukui TV, NKT, KKB, HTB
- Original run: January 3, 2026 – March 26, 2026
- Episodes: 12
- icon

Sentenced to Be a Hero: The Prison Records of Penal Hero Unit 9004 (Japanese: 勇者刑に処す 懲罰勇者9004隊刑務記録, Hepburn: Yūsha-kei ni Shosu: Chōbatsu Yūsha Kyūmarumaruyon-tai Keimu Kiroku), or simply Sentenced to Be a Hero, is a Japanese light novel series written by Rocket Shōkai and illustrated by Mephisto. The story follows Xylo Forbartz, a former knight who becomes the leader of a penal unit after being wrongly accused and sentenced, later joining forces with the goddess Teoritta to battle the hordes of demonic beings that threaten humanity. It began serialization as a web novel published on Kakuyomu in October 2020. It began publication as a light novel under ASCII Media Works' Dengeki no Shin Bungei light novel imprint in September 2021. A manga adaptation began serialization in ASCII Media Works' Dengeki Comic Regulus web magazine in March 2022.

An anime television series adaptation produced by Studio Kai aired from January to March 2026. A second season has been announced.

== Synopsis ==
=== Setting ===
Set in a world where magic and technology function together, humanity is in a war of survival against a blight of demonic faeries. Alongside the knights who work for the government and temple, there are two smaller groups that also fight against the faeries: Heroes, individuals convicted of serious crimes and forced into compulsory service; and Goddesses, highly powerful deities created for the express purpose of the war. Despite their name, Heroes are looked down upon by society and stigmatized for their crimes. While most Heroes did commit crimes in life, their sentencing to become Heroes is actually a means to suppress damning information about the government and temple in order to maintain the status quo. In addition to fighting, Heroes' punishments also involve them being forcibly resurrected every time they are killed in combat so that they can be redeployed endlessly as expendable weapons, leaving a bit of humanity behind in the afterlife each time this happens; as a result, becoming a Hero is seen as a harsher punishment than execution.

=== Plot ===
The story follows Xylo Forbartz, a former Holy Knight commander who killed the goddess he was contracted with after she became corrupted by the demonic blight. He is sentenced to be a Hero for this, which he quickly realizes is a means by the temple to prevent the public from learning that goddesses can be corrupted. Xylo is dispatched to the front lines as field leader of Penal Hero Unit 9004. During one of his missions, he ends up meeting Teoritta, the sword goddess who quickly chooses him to be her knight. Despite his great reluctance to form a contract with another goddess, he reluctantly does so to escape a particularly brutal demon encounter. Afterwards, Xylo and Teoritta team up with the rest of Penal Hero Unit 9004 while also being supervised by the Holy Knight commander Patausche Kivia, to continue fighting the faeries, while Xylo also works to figure out why he was truly set up and get revenge on those who did so.

== Characters ==
=== Main characters ===
Xylo Forbartz (ザイロ・フォルバーツ, Zairo Forubātsu)
Voiced by: Yuichi Nakamura (PV), Yōhei Azakami (anime) (Japanese); David Matranga (English)
A "hero", a criminal made immortal and forced into endless service and the leader of Penal Hero Unit 9004. Before his sentence, he was the commander of the 5th Order of the Holy Knights in a pact with the Goddess Senerva, until he was forced to euthanize her when she became corrupted by Demon Blight during a failed mission. Afterward, he was made a hero for killing a goddess, a sentence he vows to survive and get revenge after realizing that the mission was a setup. He has magical seals inscribed on his body that allow him to achieve limited flight and turn whatever sword or dagger he throws into an explosive.
Teoritta (テオリッタ)
Voiced by: Tomori Kusunoki (PV), Mayu Iizuka (anime) (Japanese); Emi Lo (English)
Teoritta is the 13th goddess of swords who Xylo and Dotta find during a mission. She is very quirky, noble, and energetic. Like all goddesses, she loves being praised and is very proud of her power. She eventually forms a pact with Xylo and helps him defeat the Demon Lord Awd Goggie. She is very fond of Xylo as her knight and is somewhat perplexed by how he cares about her survival and tells her to conserve her power, despite her being a "tool" to defeat enemies. Due to Xylo's past trauma, he tended to keep a distance from her and tried to keep Teoritta out of the fight. Despite this, Teoritta refuses to back down, telling Xylo that her purpose is to help others, and he should simply protect her if he is worried. Her power consists of summoning swords to defeat her enemies, whether hundreds of small ones or a few larger ones for Xylo to wield. She can also muster all her power into summoning a single, powerful sword capable of obliterating a Demon Lord instantly, also called a "Sacred Sword".
Patausche Kivia (パトーシェ・キヴィア, Patōshe Kivia)
Voiced by: Shizuka Ishigami (Japanese); Dawn M. Bennett (English)
The Commander of the 13th Order of the Holy Knights who Teoritta originally supposed to be contracted with. She is initially quite arrogant and despises heroes, like most people. She refused to retreat despite her orders, wanting to hold the line and die if necessary so Teoritta would be transported safely. Despite being saved by Xylo, she arrests him under suspicion of stealing Teoritta and later gets re-assigned to be their supervisor for their missions. As she sees Xylo and Teoritta in action, she slowly comes to trust them more. She is fairly capable as a commander and fighter. Later, she discovers her uncle's collusion with the Coexistors and ended up killing him in self-defense. As he was a high priest, she was arrested and sentenced to be a hero as part of a cover-up similar to Xylo, later ending up in his unit and becoming his second-in-command. She cares about Xylo as a friend/comrade and tends to get flustered when Xylo gets close or compliments her due to her growing feelings for him.

=== Penal Hero Unit 9004 ===
Dotta Luzulas (ドッタ・ルズラス, Dotta Ruzurasu)
Voiced by: Shun Horie (Japanese); Joshua Waters (English)
A fellow hero and a kleptomaniac. He loves stealing from the knights, which tends to infuriate Xylo. He was sentenced to be a hero to cover up the imprisonment of the crown prince – whom Dotta had tried to rescue while in the middle of stealing a dragon – by the state; the attempt also cost him his left arm, which has been replaced by a cybernetic prosthetic. His eyesight is exceptional, making him a good scout, but he is the second weakest of the team, after Venetim.
Venetim Leopool (ベネティム・レオプール, Benetimu Reopūru)
Voiced by: Shun'ichi Toki (Japanese); Jessie James Grelle (English)
A fellow hero who typically handles support and logistics, also able to remotely communicate with Xylo and other heroes. He tends to sit back and avoid combat at all costs in a cowardly fashion. Despite this, he supports them when they really need it. He's very intelligent and good at convincing people for his and the team's benefit. It is revealed that before he was a hero, he was a notorious con man who attracted the attention of the temple after writing an article about them. He wasn't sentenced for writing lies, but rather writing the truth.
Norgalle Senridge (ノルガユ・センリッジ, Norugayu Senrijji)
Voiced by: Yōji Ueda (Japanese); Jason Marnocha (English)
A hero who deludes himself into believing he is the king of the nation, causing him to act very confidently and order his comrades around. In reality, he led a rebellion against the Empire but was defeated, after which he was sentenced to be a hero. Despite his delusion, he truly cares for those whom he perceives as his people and is willing to die to protect them. He can create powerful seals on weapons and equipment to boost combat capacity and is fairly capable in battle.
Tatsuya (タツヤ)
Voiced by: Yoshitsugu Matsuoka (Japanese); Marcus D. Stimac (English)
The oldest hero in the Penal Hero Unit 9004. Because he has been a hero for so long and has died many times, he has lost his memories and displays little cognitive function. Not much is known about him, including what crime he was sentenced to be a hero for. Later he is revealed to be Tatsuya Ninagawa, an Earthling summoned from Japan during the First Subjugation War who served as a Hero since then, with his consciousness deteriorating after living for thousands of years. Despite his mental state, he is extremely strong in combat.
Tsav (ツァーヴ, Tsāvu)
Voiced by: Jun Fukushima (Japanese); Ben Stegmair (English)
A fellow hero. Despite his cheerful demeanor, he shows little regard for those around him and lashes out violently once upset.
A former assassin, he uses a sniper rifle tuned by Norgalle.
Jayce Partiract (ジェイス・パーチラクト, Jeisu Pāchirakuto)
Voiced by: Shōya Chiba (Japanese); Ryan Negron (English)
A dragoneer assigned to the Hero Unit. He initiated a rebellion in an attempt to save dragons, which led to him being charged with mutiny. His sentencing as a hero was on account of the rebellion being far grander in scale than previous ones, leading the embarrassed government to punish him out of spite. Cocky and outspoken, he frequently clashes with and infuriates Teoritta. He's extremely fond of his dragon mount Neely, treating her like his girlfriend and talking to her.
Neely (ニーリィ, Nīryi)
Voiced by: Yoko Hikasa (Japanese); Morgan Lauré Garrett (English)
Jayce's dragon.
Rhyno (ライノー, Rainō)
Voiced by: Yuichi Nakamura (Japanese); Daniel Van Thomas (English)
He is an eccentric and unsettling individual who serves as the artillery man among the Hero Unit. In actuality, he is a Demon Lord known as Puck Puca who, like Spriggan, parasitized a human being that previously served as a Hero and took on his identity. Unlike the other members of his Unit, he became a Penal Hero of his own volition as he carries a deep hatred towards his own species and enjoys torturing other Demon Lords for his own sadistic pleasure while seeking acceptance from his human companions.

=== Holy Knights ===
Hord Clivios (ホード・クリヴィオス, Hōdo Kuriviosu)
Voiced by: Yūya Murakami (Japanese); Seth Magill (English)
The captain of the 9th Order of the Holy Knights who is contracted to the goddess Pelmerry.
Kafzen Dachrome (カフゼン・ダクローム, Kafuzen Dakurōmu)
Voiced by: Toshihiko Seki (Japanese); Reagan Murdock (English)
The mysterious and cunning captain of the 12th Order of Holy Knights. He was the one who handled most of Unit 9004's sentencing to be heroes, including Kivia. He seems to be on humanity's side, but his true intentions are unclear. He's contracted to the Goddess Enfie, whose power is summoning books.
Rajit Heathrow (ラジット・ヒースロー, Rajitto Hīsurō)
Voiced by: Tokuyoshi Kawashima (Japanese); Nick Huber (English)
Kivia's top subordinate in the 13th Order of the Holy Knights. He is killed by Kivia's uncle, the high priest Marlen. Kivia was found guilty of the deaths of Rajit and Marlen, resulting in her being sentenced as a penal heroine.

=== Goddesses ===
Senerva (セネルバ, Seneruba)
The 5th goddess formerly contracted to Xylo. She was euthanized by Xylo when she was corrupted by a Demon Blight caused by the 11th Demon Lord on a mission that turned out to be a setup. Her death was framed as a murder that led Xylo to be sentenced to be a hero.
Pelmerry (ペルメリ, Perumeri)
Voiced by: Yurina Amami (Japanese); Rebecca Danae (English)
The 9th goddess who is contracted to Hord.
Enfie (エンフィー, Enfī)
The 12th goddess contracted to Kafzen. Her power is summoning books, which can be used for information or other means, such as helping the 1st goddess recall details about heroes so she can resurrect them accurately.

=== Demon Lords ===
Awd Goggie (オード・ゴキー, Ōdo Gokī)
The 47th Demon Lord who is the source of the Demon Blight in the Couveunge Forest.
Lotus (ロータス, Rōtasu)
A Demon Lord who is the source of the Demon Blight in the Zewan Gan mine. It specializes in the use of sound to disable or hypnotize humans.
Iblis (イブリス, Iburisu)
The 15th Demon Lord who invades Mureed Fortress. It is infamous for its regenerative capabilities, surviving numerous attempts to kill it.
Boojum (ブージャム, Būjamu)
Voiced by: Shin-ichiro Miki (Japanese); Peyton Howard (English)
Initially suspected to be Spriggan, he is a Demon Lord placed under her command by his "King". He is quite knowledgeable about humanity, Xylo, and Teoritta. He enjoys reading human literature and make strides to empathize with them out of his own curiosity. He has the ability to manipulate his blood into solid constructs such as weapons, shields and armor.
Spriggan (スプリガン, Supurigan)
A Demon Lord capable of transforming into a human. Unlike other Demon Lords, it is far more intelligent and knowledgeable, and possesses the ability to speak. Even in its human form, it is exceptionally powerful and can take over human bodies and minds after killing them, as shown when it possessed Sodrick's sister Iri in order to kill him. It is determined to eliminate Teoritta and the other goddesses so that the Demon Blight can rule over humanity and ultimately the entire world. It is eventually killed by Rhyno/Puck Puca.
Abaddon (アバドン, Abadon)
A Demon Lord who assaulted and took over the Second Capital as a surprise attack while Spriggan distracted humanity at the port city Ioff.

=== Other characters ===
Frenci Mastibolt (フレンシィ・マスティボルト, Furenshī Masutiboruto)
Voiced by: Saori Ōnishi (Japanese); Natalie Van Sistine (English)
Xylo's fiancée, though he refers to her as his "ex" due to his criminal status making a union between them forbidden – a label she firmly rejects, insisting their vows still stand. A beautiful woman who speaks bluntly and in a relatively monotone voice. Despite everything, she apparently still cares for Xylo and actively works to secure his pardon. She has a habit of comparing people and situations to strange animals or objects, and her presence around Xylo often sparks jealousy around Teoritta and Kivia.
Shiji Bau (シジ・バウ)
Voiced by: Yū Sugimoto (Japanese); Jaclyn Thomas (English)
An infamous adventurer known for killing people extremely efficiently. She's extremely capable in combat. She currently is working for Boojum and Spriggan. Boojum convinces her to betray humanity so she can protect what is dear to her. She is eventually burned alive by Neely during the battle of Ioff.
Lideo Sodrick (リデオ・ソドリック, Rideo Sodorikku)
Voiced by: Kenji Nomura (Japanese); Conner Allison (English)
A member of the Adventurer's guild who was hired by the Coexistors to kill Teoritta. He runs an "orphanage" of children he calls his family. Despite this, he trains them to be killers and assassins, implying he's somewhat of a sociopath. Spriggan later kills him, using his sister Iri's body.

== Media ==
=== Light novel ===
Written by Rocket Shōkai, Sentenced to Be a Hero: The Prison Records of Penal Hero Unit 9004 began serialization as a web novel published on the Kakuyomu website. It was later acquired by ASCII Media Works who began publishing it as a light novel with illustrations by Mephisto under their Dengeki no Shin Bungei light novel imprint. Nine volumes have been released as of October 16, 2026. The light novels are licensed in English by Yen Press.

No.	Original release date	Original ISBN	English release date	English ISBN
1	September 17, 2021	978-4-04-913903-7	August 22, 2023	978-1-9753-6826-5
1. Prologue; 2. "Punishment: Support the Retreating Troops in Couveunge Forest"; 3. "Trial Record: Xylo Forbartz"; 4. "Punishment: Pave the Way for the Suppression of the Zewan Gan Tunnels"; 5. "Standby Order: Mureed Forest"; 6. "Trial Record: Venetim Leopool"; 7. "Punishment: Defend Mureed Forest from Contamination"; 8. "Standby Order: The Port City of Ioff"
2	January 17, 2022	978-4-04-914103-0	December 12, 2023	978-1-9753-6828-9
1. "Trial Record: Dotta Luzulas"; 2. "Punishment: Sham Vacation at the Port City of Ioff"; 3. "Proof of Criminal Record: Lideo Sodrick"; 4. "Punishment: Undercover Investigation in Sodrick's Shell"; 5. "Trial Record: Tsav"; 6. "Punishment: Service at the Great Temple of Ioff"; 7. "Punishment: Evacuate and Rescue the People of Port Ioff Cheg"; 8. "Trial Record: Patausche Kivia"
3	August 17, 2022	978-4-04-914443-7	August 20, 2024	978-1-9753-9134-8
1. "Punishment: Diversion in the Tujin Tuga Hills"; 2. "Punishment: Defend the Fortification on the Tujin Tuga Front Line"; 3. "Trial Record: Lawtzir Zer-Zeal Meht Kioh"; 4. "Punishment: Resupplying in Kerpresh"; 5. "Punishment: Seal Off the Tujin Ravine"; 6. "Standby Order: Temporary Fortress Tujin Bahark"; 7. "Proof of Criminal Record: Tovitz Hughker"; 8. "Proof of Criminal Record: Kafzen Dachrome"
4	December 16, 2022	978-4-04-914672-1	May 20, 2025	978-1-9753-9136-2
1. "The Saint's Log: Reclaiming the Second Capital of Zeyllent"; 2. "Punishment: Zeyllent Black Ops"; 3. "Trial Record: Jayce Partiract"; 4. "Punishment: Battle at Silver Street Asagarsha"; 5. "Punishment: Reclaim Zeyllent, the Second Capital"; 6. "Standby Order: The Repair Shop in the Depths of Galtuile"; 7. "The Saint's Log: Ragi Enseglef, Preparation for an Offensive Strategy"
5	August 17, 2023	978-4-04-915168-8	December 9, 2025	979-8-8554-0761-7
1. "Standby Order: First Capital of Zeyllent"; 2. "Punishment: Manipulate the Luffe Aros Election"; 3. "Punishment: Prevent Enemy Interference in the Election"
6	April 17, 2024	978-4-04-915606-5	September 8, 2026	979-8-8554-2255-9
1. "Standby Order: The Partiract Summer House"; 2. "The Saint's Log: Conquest of the Valligarhi Channel's Northern Shore"; 3. "Punishment: Outfit the Biacco Eastern Military Port"; 4. "Punishment: Advance Northward Across the Valligarhi Channel"; 5. "Punishment: Advance Northward Through the Lissekert Massif"; 6. "Punishment: Escape from the Zehai Dahé's Reef Fortress"; 7. "Punishment: Conduct Covert Reconnaissance Along the Valligarhi Channel"; 8. "Punishment: Take Down Broc Numéa Fortress"
7	January 17, 2025	978-4-04-916024-6	—	—
8	January 17, 2026	978-4-04-916550-0	—	—
9	October 16, 2026	978-4-04-952415-4	—	—

=== Manga ===
A manga adaptation illustrated by Natsumi Inoue began serialization in ASCII Media Works' Dengeki Comic Regulus web magazine on March 25, 2022. It has been collected in three volumes as of October 27, 2026. The manga adaptation is published digitally in English on Kadokawa Corporation's BookWalker website. In December 2025, Yen Press announced that they would begin releasing the manga in volume form in June 2026.

No.	Original release date	Original ISBN	North American release date	North American ISBN
1	December 9, 2022	978-4-04-914726-1	June 23, 2026	979-8-8554-3791-1
Chapters 1–5
2	April 26, 2024	978-4-04-915691-1	September 22, 2026	979-8-8554-4018-8
Chapters 6–10; The Trial: Xylo Forbartz
3	October 27, 2026	978-4-04-952471-0	—	—

=== Anime ===
An anime adaptation was announced at the Dengeki Bunko 30th anniversary event in July 2023, which was later confirmed to be a television series produced by Studio Kai and directed by Hiroyuki Takashima, with Yoshitake Nakakōji serving as assistant director, Kenta Ihara handling series composition, Takeshi Noda designing the characters, and Shunsuke Takizawa composing the music. The series was initially scheduled for October 2025, but was later delayed in order to further improve the series' quality, which eventually premiered at Comic Fiesta on December 21, 2025 and aired from January 3 to March 26, 2026, on Tokyo MX and other networks. The opening theme song is "Kill the Noise", performed by Spyair. Crunchyroll is streaming the series. Medialink licensed the series for streaming on Ani-One Asia's YouTube channel.

A second season was announced at the AnimeJapan event on March 28, 2026.

==== Episodes ====
No.	Title	Directed by	Storyboarded by	Chief animation directed by	Original release date
1	"Sentence: Support Retreat From Couveunge Forest"; Transliteration: "Keibatsu: Kuvunji Shinrin Tettai Shien" (Japanese: 刑罰:クヴンジ森林撤退支援)	Hiroyuki Takashima, Taisuke Tsukuda & Ōri Yasukawa	Hiroyuki Takashima	Masaru Obata, Yasutaka Kimura, Pin Qiao Zeng & Takeshi Noda	January 3, 2026
Immortal heroes Xylo Forbrantz and Dotta Luzulas are tasked with aiding Holy Knights escape from a Demonic Blight, which turns animals exposed to it into monsters called faeries. Inside a coffin Dotta retrieved from the knights, they find a goddess, a powerful, living weapon in the form of a girl named Teoritta. Upon awakening, Teoritta asks Xylo to form a pact with her, but he refuses. Fellow hero Venetim Leopool then informs Xylo that the knights' commander, Patausche Kivia, is refusing to retreat. Rushing to her location, Xylo tries to convince Kivia to follow orders. However, they are then attacked by the blight's source, the Demon Lord Awd Goggie. With no other choice, Xylo forms a pact with Teoritta, allowing him to defeat the Demon Lord. Afterward, however, Kivia arrests Xylo and reveals to Teoritta that he is an ex-Holy Knight who murdered his former goddess, Senerva. In a flashback of Xylo's trial, he insists that he euthanized Senerva to prevent her succumbing to a blight, but is ultimately ignored, causing him to realize that he was set up and vow vengeance on the conspirators as he is sentenced to be a hero.
2	"Sentence: Spearhead the Recapture of the Zewan Gan Tunnels 1"; Transliteration: "Keibatsu: Zewan-Gan Kōdō Seiatsu Sendō Ichi" (Japanese: 刑罰:ゼワン=ガン坑道制圧先導1)	Takanari Hirayama	Hiroyuki Takashima & Takumi Narita	Masaru Obata & Yasutaka Kimura	January 15, 2026
Xylo asks Teoritta to end their pact, but she refuses. Returning to duty, Xylo, Teoritta, Venetim, Norgalle Senridge, a hero who deludes himself that he is royalty, and Tatsuya, a hero despondent from over-resurrection, are tasked with defeating faeries that have infested a mine near the town of Zewan Gan. Suspiciously, upon arriving, they find that the inhabitants have not evacuated, and the faeries are confined inside the mine. Though Xylo is skeptical of the situation, the group descends into the mines where they reunite with Kivia, who is there on her own mission. After setting up camp, the heroes receive a distress signal from Kivia, who is under attack from miners who have been transformed into Faeries, and they come to her aid. Afterward, a surviving miner requests their aid to rescue his trapped colleagues. However, this conflicts with Kivia's mission: caving in the mine with explosives. Therefore, to not endanger anyone else, Xylo decides to rescue the miners by himself.
3	"Sentence: Spearhead the Recapture of the Zewan Gan Tunnels 2"; Transliteration: "Keibatsu: Zewan-Gan Kōdō Seiatsu Sendō Ni" (Japanese: 刑罰:ゼワン=ガン坑道制圧先導2)	Fumiaki Usui	Fumiaki Kōta & Hiroyuki Takashima	Masaru Obata & Chikashi Kadekaru	January 22, 2026
Xylo, with assistance from Norgalle and Tatsuya, defeats the faeries to protect the trapped miners. One of the miners warns Xylo about a strange voice that caused his colleagues to transform into faeries. More faeries attack, which the heroes and miners manage to defeat. A bigger wave of faeries overwhelms them, but Teoritta defeats them despite Xylo's orders to stay behind. Afterwards, the heroes and miners hear a powerful screech, an attack called Tinnitus from the blight's source, the Demon Lord Lotus. Unaffected by Tinnitus, Tatsuya engages with Lotus directly with Xylo assisting from a distance. However, the body turns out to be a decoy with the real body going after the Holy Knights. Norgalle attempts to defeat Lotus with a sacred seal but is immobilized by Lotus. Norgalle cuts his leg off to free himself and provide an opening for Xylo to defeat Lotus. Afterwards, the miners return to town, and Kivia comes to the heroes' defense for their deeds after being called out for violating several regulations. The leader of the miners and his family personally thank Xylo despite his status as a hero, since it doesn't change the fact he saved their lives.
4	"Standby Order: Mureed Fortress"; Transliteration: "Taiki Shirei: Myūriddo Yōsai" (Japanese: 待機指令:ミューリッド要塞)	Tsuyoshi Tobita	Hiroyuki Takashima & Shunsuke Machitani	Hiroshi Yakou	January 29, 2026
The heroes arrive at Mureed Fortress during the Great Exchange festival for their next mission. While Teoritta and the others enjoy the festival, Xylo initially confines himself to the heroes' dungeon quarters until Kivia approaches him. Speaking in private, Kivia comes clean about actually being glad that Xylo contracted Teoritta, revealing that the military was planning to experiment on her to mass-produce goddesses. The heroes learn that their assignment is a suicide mission to defend the fortress and lure the local Demon Lord, Iblis, so that the holy knights can kill it; any attempt to flee will result in execution. As he negotiates for better terms, Venetim recalls the trial where he was sentenced to be a hero: a former con-man who attempted to sell the royal castle to a circus; he was really arrested to silence him after he wrote a fake news article about Demon Lord worshippers infiltrating the Holy Knights, which, unbeknownst to him, is actually true. Elsewhere, another hero, Tsav, cuts off the hand of a cheating dealer whom he lost a gamble to.
5	"Sentence: Defense Against Corruption at Mureed Fortress 1"; Transliteration: "Keibatsu: Myūriddo Yōsai Bōei Osen Ichi" (Japanese: 刑罰:ミューリッド要塞防衛汚染1)	Shin Mita	Shin Mita	Chikashi Kadekaru	February 5, 2026
Tsav, an assassin of the Gwen Mohsa, was sentenced for being a serial killer with a government official among his victims. Preparations for the battle against Iblis continue as Xylo, Kivia, Dotta, and Tsav go on a scouting mission, anticipating the faeries arriving at night, while Tsav uses his sniping ability to shoot the faerie scouts. Returning to the fortress, Xylo encounters Hord Clivios, Captain of the 9th Order, and his contracted goddess Pelmerry. Meanwhile, the rescued miners from Zewan Gan volunteer to assist in the defense. Xylo explains the plan as the soldiers fight the faeries in order to draw Iblis out for Xylo to defeat by himself before it gets close to the fortress. Afterwards, Xylo gets a letter from Frenci Mastibolt that he refuses to read despite the promise of additional reinforcements, while Venetim expresses his concern about the lack of soldiers in this operation. That night, the battle begins as the first wave of faeries are easily defeated. However, the battle takes a turn as humans are spotted fighting alongside the faeries. The human enemies destroy the traps and barriers, allowing the faeries to breach the fortress.
6	"Sentence: Defense Against Corruption at Mureed Fortress 2"; Transliteration: "Keibatsu: Myūriddo Yōsai Bōei Osen Ni" (Japanese: 刑罰:ミューリッド要塞防衛汚染2)	Jun Nakajima	Shunpei Umemoto & Hiroyuki Takashima	Yasutaka Kimura	February 12, 2026
With the situation dire, Xylo decides to charge towards Iblis and deal with it together with Teoritta. Meanwhile, Tatsuya kills the human enemies without remorse. As Xylo and Teoritta charge forward, the soldiers Venetim called in arrive despite Xylo's disapproval, as well as mercenaries chasing Dotta having stolen their money instead of hiring them as asked. The sudden arrival of reinforcements confuses Iblis, giving Xylo an opening to attack it, then lure it to a trap he set up during the scouting mission for Teoritta to defeat. However, Iblis survives and Xylo is seriously wounded protecting Teoritta from a surprise attack by Iblis. Teoritta convinces Xylo to continue fighting by summoning a powerful "holy sword" from another world that can destroy anything it touches. With Dotta and Tsav covering for him, Xylo slays Iblis with the sword. Sometime later, Xylo awakens in the infirmary in a port city and is greeted by Kafzen Dachrome, Captain of the 12th Order. Kafzen warns Xylo about the Coexisters, a faction seeking harmony with the Demon Blight and views Xylo as a big threat. Teoritta then comes to visit him, and he finally accepts her as a Goddess.
7	"Sentence: Feigned Day Off at Port City Ioff"; Transliteration: "Keibatsu: Kōwan Toshi Yōfu Kyūka Gisō" (Japanese: 刑罰:港湾都市ヨーフ休暇偽装)	Yuichi Shimohira	Naoki Takeda	Takeshi Noda	February 19, 2026
Now in the port city Ioff, Kivia orders Xylo to protect Teoritta from the heretics expelled from the temple and are temporarily off the front lines. Afterwards, Jayce Partiract, a dragoon hero who has trafficked drugs and was sentenced for allegedly inciting a rebellion, comes in to collect his pay from Xylo for winning a wager over who killed more Demon Lords. Xylo is discharged and meets with Frenci, his former fiancée. Frenci tells Xylo that despite the law banning marriage for heroes, she intends to secure a pardon so she can marry him, and that she came to locate Spriggan, a Demon Lord masquerading as a human. To lure out the heretics, Xylo, Teoritta, Kivia, and Tsav go shopping in disguise. Two assassins strike in the market, and the four run towards the alternate route expecting backup from the Holy Knights, but they never arrive. They are attacked by the assassin Shiji Bau, followed by the heretic squad led by Boojum. Jayce and his dragon partner Neely attack from above to kill the heretics, but Shiji Bau dodges the attack, while Boojum survives it as Teoritta suspects that Boojum is Spriggan.
8	"Sentence: Undercover Investigation in District of Sodrick 1"; Transliteration: "Keibatsu: Sodorikku Gaiku Sennyū Chōsa Ichi" (Japanese: 刑罰:ソドリック街区潜入調査1)	Jun Fujiwara	Jun Fujiwara	Yasutaka Kimura	February 26, 2026
Suspecting that Lideo Sodrick, the local guild's guildmaster, betrayed the Holy Knights leading to a massive loss of soldiers, Kivia is tasked with kidnapping Lideo and investigating the guild. The next day, Xylo, Kivia, and Dotta disguise themselves as nobles to infiltrate the guild that has Dotta recalling his trial. He was sentenced for stealing a dragon at the request of the captive crowned prince, which the judges refused to believe. On their way to the guild, Kivia tells Xylo that her parents are priests and being distrustful of their influence, she joined the military with her uncle's blessing to walk her own path. Dotta learns that the guild raises orphaned children to be their loyal soldiers. Xylo and Kivia arrive at the guild and submit a job request. However, the guild anticipated their arrival, and before Xylo causes a commotion, Frenci, posing as an undercover adventurer, intervenes. As the three converse, an assassin and several child soldiers attack, but Xylo and Kivia defeat them with the fight causing collateral damage to the guild hall. Xylo views this as an opportunity to clean up the city's corruption.
9	"Sentence: Undercover Investigation in District of Sodrick 2"; Transliteration: "Keibatsu: Sodorikku Gaiku Sennyū Chōsa Ni" (Japanese: 刑罰:ソドリック街区潜入調査2)	Ōri Yasukawa	Takashi Katagiri	Masaru Obata & Chikashi Kadekaru	March 5, 2026
Lideo orders all guild adventurers to fight as he and Iri, Lideo's sister and second-in-command at the guild, escape under the cover of the chaos. The adventurers are easily dealt with by Xylo, Kivia, and Frenci before a faerie suddenly attacks. Teoritta and the other heroes arrive to help out as Xylo and Teoritta slay the faerie. As Lideo and Iri escape, they get separated and Dotta apprehends Lideo. Meanwhile, Boojum orders the mercenary Iron Whale to erase any link of him to Lideo, with Shiji Bau reluctantly accepting the job as well. With Lideo in custody, he agrees to tell everything he knows in exchange for sparing his younger siblings and reveals that he was ordered to kill Teoritta from a masked Coexister known as the saint Mahaeyzel Zelkoff fearing death for himself and his family if he refused. Kivia is shocked when she recognizes the name, but before she can follow up, Iron Whale suddenly attacks the guild hall and Lideo flees. Lideo reunites with Iri in the underground waterways, but is killed by her, who is revealed to be Spriggan having possessed Iri after killing her and the other children.
10	"Sentence: Aid in Evacuation of Ioff Cheg Port 1"; Transliteration: "Keibatsu: Yōfu Chegu Kōwan Hinan Kyūjo Ichi" (Japanese: 刑罰:ヨーフ・チェグ港湾避難救助1)	Fumiaki Usui & Shunsuke Machitani	Shunsuke Machitani	Masaru Obata, Chikashi Kadekaru & Yasutaka Kimura	March 12, 2026
The next day, Kivia gathers evidence from the guild hall, while Venetim requests the release of the incarcerated volunteer hero Rhyno. Xylo and Teoritta go to the temple to meet the high priest, and Kivia's uncle, Marlen. With an attack imminent, Xylo meets up with Venetim and Rhyno to discuss battle strategy as the military is ordered to defend the government facilities while the heroes protect the civilians in the port district on their own. Xylo, Teoritta, Rhyno, and Tatsuya are tasked with storming Tui Jia, the armed coral tower taken over by faeries, and Xylo is concerned about the lack of manpower. As such, Xylo formulates a plan for Rhyno to stage a false flag attack on temple owned ships in the harbor. With their ships at risk, the Temple orders Kivia to respond, and she authorizes Jayce to deploy with his dragon. Meanwhile, the underground waterways are locked down with the soldiers fighting the faeries until they are killed by Boojum. Kivia then meets up with Marlen, who has united the military and temple for this battle, but becomes concerned when he speaks about Saint Mahaeyzel, reluctantly suspecting he is a Coexister.
11	"Sentence: Aid in Evacuation of Ioff Cheg Port 2"; Transliteration: "Keibatsu: Yōfu Chegu Kōwan Hinan Kyūjo Ni" (Japanese: 刑罰:ヨーフ・チェグ港湾避難救助2)	Fumiaki Usui, Shunpei Umemoto & Yoshiki Nakakōji	Hirotaka Tokuda	Masaru Obata & Yasutaka Kimura	March 19, 2026
Suspected Marlen to be a Coexister, Kivia asks him who reported the presence of faeries, and he answers Ioff City Defense Force Unit 7110, which she doubts. With the soldiers locking down the waterways killed, the faeries infiltrate the city with the Holy Knights fighting them. With the sheltered civilians in danger, Xylo entrusts Rhyno and Tatsuya with protecting them while Jayce and Neely arrive. Dotta spots Iron Whale sniping from Tui Jia, prompting Xylo to storm the tower by himself with Teoritta. Meanwhile, Kivia entrusts her subordinate Rajit Heathrow with some important secret information. She then approaches Frenci and asks her to spy on Marlen. Xylo charges towards the tower with Rhyno and Jayce covering him, and he encounters Shiji Bau near the entrance. Xylo immobilizes Shiji Bau and sends her airborne for Neely to kill with its fire breath, while Rhyno launches a barrage of shots to defeat Iron Whale. Xylo arrives at the base of the tower and is attacked by Boojum in his true form. As he fights Boojum, Xylo topples the tower with a wayward attack, leaving Boojum vulnerable. Teoritta summons the "Holy Sword" and Xylo slays Boojum with it.
12	"Sentence: Aid in Evacuation of Ioff Cheg Port 3"; Transliteration: "Keibatsu: Yōfu Chegu Kōwan Hinan Kyūjo San" (Japanese: 刑罰:ヨーフ・チェグ港湾避難救助3)	Fumiaki Kōta, Hiroyuki Takashima & Taisuke Tsukuda	Hiroyuki Takashima	Masaru Obata, Yasutaka Kimura & Takeshi Noda	March 26, 2026
Spriggan attempts a sneak attack on Teoritta by approaching her as Iri, but Teoritta blocks the attack. Xylo and Tsav both then attack Spriggan, forcing her to flee. Rhyno then kills Spriggan after revealing himself as Puck Puca, a parasitic Demon Lord who assumed Rhyno's identity so he could murder other Demon Lords. Meanwhile, Boojum survives the attack and leaves Ioff. After the battle, Frenci confirms Kivia's suspicions and she confronts Marlen and outs the fact that he has been conspiring with the Coexisters. An enraged Kivia kills Marlen after her uncle kills Rajit and is arrested on charges of murdering both men. Meanwhile, Frenci returns to inform Xylo that the attack on Ioff is just a diversion and the Demon Blight's real objective was to conquer the second capital city, Zeyllent, which has fallen due to the reduced military presence there. With Kivia now a criminal, Kafzen presents Kivia with the choice to either be executed as a Coexister or to become a hero. Kafzen further explains heroes are actually corpses revived by the First Goddess, so Kivia would have to die to become one. Determined to keep fighting, Kivia accepts Kafzen's deal and ends her own life.

=== Video game ===
A video game project, titled Sentenced to Be a Hero: Game of the Goddess, was announced at the AnimeJapan event alongside the anime's second season on March 28, 2026.

== Reception ==
In the 2023 edition of the Kono Light Novel ga Sugoi! guidebook, the series ranked third in the tankōbon category.

== See also ==
- Scum of the Brave, another light novel series written by Rocket Shōkai
- As a Reincarnated Aristocrat, I'll Use My Appraisal Skill to Rise in the World, a light novel series, whose manga adaptation is also illustrated by Natsumi Inoue
