= Yurina Uchiyama =

Japanese voice actress and singer

- 内山 悠里菜
- Born: April 28, 1998 (age 28); Aichi Prefecture, Japan
- Occupations: Voice actress, singer
- Years active: 2018–present
- Agent: 24chocolate
- Notable work: Cue! as Haruna Mutsuishi

Yurina Uchiyama (内山 悠里菜, Uchiyama Yurina; born April 28, 1998) is a Japanese voice actress and singer from Aichi Prefecture. She is known for her role as Haruna Mutsuishi in the multimedia project Cue!. She is also a member of the idol group Dialogue.

== Biography ==
Uchiyama was born in Aichi Prefecture on April 28, 1998. She was greatly influenced by her older sister and they would often play together. While in elementary school she was inspired to become a voice actress after playing the video game Tales of Phantasia, a desire that grew after watching the anime series Cardfight!! Vanguard while in junior high school. To practice her skills, she would often recreate drama scenes with her older sister. As a junior high school student she was part of her school's handball team, playing as part of the starting line-up.

Uchiyama started her voice acting career in 2017 after passing an audition held by the talent agency Stardust Promotion. In 2019, she became a member of the idol group Dialogue, which became associated with the mobile game and multimedia project Cue!. She was also cast as the character Haruna Mutsuishi in Cue!, playing the role in the franchise's mobile game and its later 2022 anime adaptation. In 2021, Uchiyama became part of Seiyū e-Sports-Bu, a non-professional esports team featuring various voice actresses playing games on YouTube.

On June 25, 2022, her management announced that she will be going on hiatus for health reasons.

== Personal life ==
Uchiyama comes from a family of five, consisting of her parents, an older sister, herself, and a younger brother. She is an avid gamer and cites Minecraft and Fortnite as among her favorite games.

== Filmography ==
=== Anime ===
2021

- Higehiro, Girl (episode 9)

2022

- Cue!, Haruna Mutsuishi

=== Games ===
2019

- Cue!, Haruna Mutsuishi

2020

- Onegai, Ore wo Genjitsu ni Modosanaide! Symphonia Stage, Yū Ayukawa
