= Hell Mode =

Japanese light novel series

- Hell Mode: The Hardcore Gamer Dominates in Another World with Garbage Balancing
- First light novel volume cover, featuring Allen (top) and Krena (bottom)

ヘルモード ～やり込み好きのゲーマーは廃設定の異世界で無双する～ (Heru Mōdo: Yarikomizuki no Gēmā wa Hai Settei no Isekai de Musō Suru)
- Genre: Isekai
- Novel series
- Written by: Hamuo
- Published by: Shōsetsuka ni Narō
- Original run: November 17, 2019 – present
- Light novel
- Written by: Hamuo
- Illustrated by: Mo
- Published by: Earth Star Entertainment
- English publisher: NA: J-Novel Club; Yen Press (print)
- Imprint: Earth Star Novel
- Original run: July 15, 2020 – present
- Volumes: 14
- Manga
- Written by: Hamuo
- Illustrated by: Enji Tetta
- Published by: Earth Star Entertainment
- English publisher: NA: J-Novel Club
- Imprint: Earth Star Comics
- Magazine: Comic Earth Star
- Original run: October 15, 2020 – present
- Volumes: 15
- Anime television series
- Directed by: Masato Tamagawa
- Written by: Daishiro Tanimura
- Music by: Misaki Tsuchida; Moyu Kanazaki; Junko Nakajima; Kanada Sakuma; Reiko Abe; Kaho Sawada; BeauDamian; Tsugumi Tanaka
- Studio: Yokohama Animation Laboratory
- Licensed by: Sentai Filmworks
- Original network: Tokyo MX, MBS, BS NTV, AT-X
- Original run: January 10, 2026 – present
- Episodes: 25

Hell Mode: The Hardcore Gamer Dominates in Another World with Garbage Balancing (Japanese: ヘルモード ～やり込み好きのゲーマーは廃設定の異世界で無双する～, Hepburn: Heru Mōdo: Yarikomizuki no Gēmā wa Hai Settei no Isekai de Musō Suru) is a Japanese light novel series written by Hamuo and illustrated by Mo. It began serialization online in November 2019 on the user-generated novel publishing website Shōsetsuka ni Narō. The series was later acquired and published by Earth Star Entertainment under their Earth Star Novel imprint since July 2020. A manga adaptation with art by Enji Tetta has been serialized online via Earth Star Entertainment's Comic Earth Star website since October 2020. An anime television series adaptation produced by Yokohama Animation Laboratory aired from January to March 2026. A second season aired from July to September of the same year. A third season has been announced.

== Plot ==
Kenichi Yamada, a 35-year-old office worker and veteran MMORPG player, becomes disillusioned with modern games that cater to casual play. When he encounters a mysterious new game that promises endless progression and an extreme difficulty setting called "Hell Mode", he selects it without hesitation. Upon doing so, Kenichi is reincarnated into another world as a newborn boy named Allen, born into a family of serfs, with no status or wealth.

Living under the harsh rules of Hell Mode, Allen chooses the Summoner class, which offers vast potential, but requires significant effort to grow stronger. With only his previous memories and wits to guide him, he painstakingly experiments to understand his abilities while training from early childhood. As he steadily develops his power, Allen works toward improving his family's circumstances and escaping serfdom.

== Characters ==
Allen (アレン, Aren)
Voiced by: Mutsumi Tamura (audio drama, anime) (Japanese); Luci Christian (English)
Krena (クレナ, Kurena)
Voiced by: Mayu Iizuka (anime) (Japanese); Natalie Rial (English)
Dogora (ドゴラ)
Voiced by: Tasuku Hatanaka (anime) (Japanese); Chaney Moore (English)
Cecil Granvelle (セシル・グランヴェル, Seshiru Guranveru)
Voiced by: Kana Ueda (audio drama), Sayaka Senbongi (anime) (Japanese); Cat Thomas (English)
Rodin (ロダン, Rodan)
Voiced by: Hideo Ishikawa (anime) (Japanese); Jeremy Gee (English)
Theresia (テレシア, Tereshia)
Voiced by: Sayaka Ohara (anime) (Japanese); Annie Wild (English)
Matthew (マッシュ, Masshu)
Voiced by: Makoto Koichi (anime) (Japanese); Kalin Coates (English)
Butler Von Granvelle (バトラー = フォン = グランヴェル, Batorā Fon Guranveru)
Voiced by: Tomokazu Sugita (anime)
Mikhail Granvelle (ミハイ = グランヴェル, Mihai Guranveru)
Voiced by: Shōya Chiba (anime)
Thomas Granvelle (トマス = グランヴェル, Tomasu Guranveru)
Voiced by: Marie Miyake (anime)
Zenoff (ゼノフ, Zenofu)
Voiced by: Akio Ōtsuka (anime) (Japanese); Jay Hickman (English)
Carnell (カルネル, Karuneru)
Voiced by: Takahiro Miyamoto (anime)
Helmios (ヘルミオス, Herumiosu)
Voiced by: Takahiro Sakurai (Japanese); Scott Gibbs (English)
Keel (キール, Kīru)
Voiced by: Reiji Kawashima (Japanese); Elissa Cuellar (English)
Sophialohne (ソフィアローネ, Sofiarōne)
Voiced by: Kiyono Yasuno
Volmaar (フォルマール, Forumāru)
Voiced by: Hikaru Midorikawa
Meruru (メルル)
Voiced by: Miyu Tomita
Dverg (ドベルグ, Doberugu)
Voiced by: Taketora (Japanese); Cyrus Rodas (English)
Theodojiil (テオドシール, Teodoshīru)
Voiced by: Shin-ichiro Miki (Japanese); Gabriel Regojo (English)
Maria (マリア)
Voiced by: Yui Horie (Japanese); Juliet Simmons (English)
Sigur (シグール, Shigūru)
Voiced by: Yuuki Sanpei
Lukidral (ルキドラール, Rukidorāru)
Voiced by: Yasuyuki Kase
Gatoruga (ガトルーガ, Gatorūga)
Voiced by: Kō Bonkobara
Graster (グラスター, Gurasutā)
Voiced by: Satoshi Tsuruoka
Neftira (ネフティラ, Nefutira)
Voiced by: Takaaki Torashima
Yagof (ヤゴフ, Yagofu)
Voiced by: Shinya Takahashi

== Media ==
=== Light novels ===
Written by Hamuo, Hell Mode: The Hardcore Gamer Dominates in Another World with Garbage Balancing began serialization on the user-generated novel publishing website Shōsetsuka ni Narō on November 17, 2019. It was later acquired and released by Earth Star Entertainment with illustrations by Mo under their Earth Star Novel light novel imprint on July 15, 2020. Fourteen volumes have been released as of July 15, 2026.

During their panel at Anime Expo Lite 2021, J-Novel Club announced that they had licensed the series for English publication. During their panel at Anime NYC 2022, J-Novel Club announced that print releases of the series would be handled by Yen Press.

| No. | Original release date | Original ISBN | North American release date | North American ISBN |
|---|---|---|---|---|
| 1 | July 15, 2020 | 978-4-8030-1433-4 | October 13, 2021 (digital); June 6, 2023 (print) | 978-1-7183-8198-8 (digital); 978-1-9753-6849-4 (print) |
| 2 | November 16, 2020 | 978-4-8030-1468-6 | January 4, 2022 (digital); September 19, 2023 (print) | 978-1-7183-8200-8 (digital); 978-1-9753-6850-0 (print) |
| 3 | March 17, 2021 | 978-4-8030-1501-0 | April 13, 2022 (digital); January 30, 2024 (print) | 978-1-7183-8202-2 (digital); 978-1-9753-6851-7 (print) |
| 4 | September 15, 2021 | 978-4-8030-1564-5 | July 27, 2022 (digital); May 21, 2024 (print) | 978-1-7183-8204-6 (digital); 978-1-9753-6852-4 (print) |
| 5 | March 16, 2022 | 978-4-8030-1624-6 | January 11, 2023 (digital); August 20, 2024 (print) | 978-1-7183-8206-0 (digital); 978-1-9753-6853-1 (print) |
| 6 | September 15, 2022 | 978-4-8030-1693-2 | July 31, 2023 (digital); November 19, 2024 (print) | 978-1-7183-8208-4 (digital); 978-1-9753-6854-8 (print) |
| 7 | March 15, 2023 | 978-4-8030-1763-2 | January 15, 2024 (digital); February 18, 2025 (print) | 978-1-7183-8210-7 (digital); 979-8-8554-0556-9 (print) |
| 8 | October 18, 2023 | 978-4-8030-1848-6 | December 18, 2024 (digital); June 10, 2025 (print) | 978-1-7183-8212-1 (digital); 979-8-8554-2143-9 (print) |
| 9 | April 17, 2024 | 978-4-8030-1938-4 | March 26, 2025 (digital); December 16, 2025 (print) | 978-1-7183-8214-5 (digital); 979-8-8554-2382-2 (print) |
| 10 | September 13, 2024 | 978-4-8030-2007-6 | September 2, 2025 (digital); May 12, 2026 (print) | 978-1-7183-8216-9 (digital); 979-8-8554-3343-2 (print) |
| 11 | March 14, 2025 | 978-4-8030-2099-1 | December 26, 2025 (digital); January 12, 2027 (print) | 978-1-7183-8218-3 (digital); 979-8-8554-4724-8 (print) |
| 12 | October 16, 2025 | 978-4-8030-2198-1 | August 5, 2026 (digital) | 978-1-7183-8220-6 |
| 13 | January 15, 2026 | 978-4-8030-2252-0 | December 30, 2026 (digital) | 978-1-7183-8222-0 |
| 14 | July 15, 2026 | 978-4-8030-2342-8 | — | — |

=== Manga ===
A manga adaptation illustrated by Enji Tetta began serialization on Earth Star Entertainment's Comic Earth Star manga service on October 15, 2020. The manga's chapters have been compiled into fifteen tankōbon volumes as of November 2026.

During their panel at Anime Expo 2023, J-Novel Club announced that they had also licensed the manga adaptation for English publication.

| No. | Original release date | Original ISBN | North American release date | North American ISBN |
|---|---|---|---|---|
| 1 | May 12, 2021 | 978-4-8030-1516-4 | September 20, 2023 | 978-1-7183-8720-1 |
| 2 | October 12, 2021 | 978-4-8030-1566-9 | December 27, 2023 | 978-1-7183-8721-8 |
| 3 | March 12, 2022 | 978-4-8030-1622-2 | April 27, 2024 | 978-1-7183-8722-5 |
| 4 | August 10, 2022 | 978-4-8030-1676-5 | August 7, 2024 | 978-1-7183-8723-2 |
| 5 | January 12, 2023 | 978-4-8030-1733-5 | December 25, 2024 | 978-1-7183-8724-9 |
| 6 | June 12, 2023 | 978-4-8030-1791-5 | April 16, 2025 | 978-1-7183-8725-6 |
| 7 | October 12, 2023 | 978-4-8030-1844-8 | August 6, 2025 | 978-1-7183-8726-3 |
| 8 | March 13, 2024 | 978-4-8030-1919-3 | October 15, 2025 | 978-1-7183-8727-0 |
| 9 | July 12, 2024 | 978-4-8030-1978-0 | December 24, 2025 | 978-1-7183-8728-7 |
| 10 | December 12, 2024 | 978-4-8030-2047-2 | April 29, 2026 | 978-1-7183-8729-4 |
| 11 | April 11, 2025 | 978-4-8030-2110-3 | September 2, 2026 | 978-1-7183-8730-0 |
| 12 | September 12, 2025 | 978-4-8030-2180-6 | December 23, 2026 | — |
| 13 | January 9, 2026 | 978-4-8030-2248-3 | — | — |
| 14 | July 10, 2026 | 978-4-8030-2337-4 | — | — |
| 15 | November 12, 2026 | 978-4-8030-2420-3 | — | — |

=== Anime ===
An anime television series adaptation was announced on December 5, 2024. It is produced by Yokohama Animation Laboratory and directed by Masato Tamagawa, with Daishiro Tanimura handling series composition, Kei Tsushima designing the characters, and Misaki Tsuchida, Moyu Kanazaki, Junko Nakajima, Kanada Sakuma, Reiko Abe, Kaho Sawada, BeauDamian, and Tsugumi Tanaka composing the music. The series aired from January 10 to March 28, 2026, on Tokyo MX and other networks. (Note: Tokyo MX listed the series premiere on January 9 at 25:05, which is effectively January 10 at 1:05 a.m. JST.) The opening theme song is "Haku" (ハク), performed by Atarayo, while the ending theme song is "Sanctuary", performed by Kaya. Sentai Filmworks licensed the series in North America for streaming on Hidive.

Following the airing of the final episode, a second season was announced, which aired from July 4 to September 26, 2026. (Note: Tokyo MX listed the season preimere on July 3 at 25:00, which is effectively July 4 at 1:00 a.m. JST.) The opening theme song is "○✕△□" performed by Romanha Marshmallow, and the ending theme song is "Firetail" performed by ChoQMay.

After the airing of the finale of the second season, a third season was announced, which will cover the "S-Kyū Dungeon Kо̄ryaku-hen" ("S-Rank Dungeon Conquest Arc").

==== Episodes ====
===== Season 1 (2026) =====
| No. overall | No. in season | Title | Directed by (Note: Production staff information is taken from the ending credits of each episode.) | Written by | Storyboarded by | Original release date |
|---|---|---|---|---|---|---|
| 1 | 1 | "Born Again at Bottom-Tier"; Transliteration: "Tensei Shitara Nōdodatta" (Japanese: 転生したら農奴だった) | Akira Kato | Daishiro Tanimura | Tamagawa Masato | January 10, 2026 |
| 2 | 2 | "The Appraisal Ceremony"; Transliteration: "Kantei no Gi" (Japanese: 鑑定の儀) | Kim Hye-jeong | Daishiro Tanimura | Tamagawa Masato | January 17, 2026 |
| 3 | 3 | "Trouble"; Transliteration: "Jiken" (Japanese: 事件) | Sumika Takase | Shingo Irie | Kinomiya | January 24, 2026 |
| 4 | 4 | "Allen Spills the Beans"; Transliteration: "Aren no Kokuhaku" (Japanese: アレンの告白) | Sumika Takase | Daishiro Tanimura | Kinomiya | January 31, 2026 |
| 5 | 5 | "A Summoner's Potential"; Transliteration: "Shōkansamurai no Chikara" (Japanese: 召喚士の力) | Akira Kato | Shingo Irie | Kinomiya | February 7, 2026 |
| 6 | 6 | "Outward Bound"; Transliteration: "Tabidachi" (Japanese: 旅立ち) | Oh Eun-soo | Daishiro Tanimura | Kinomiya | February 14, 2026 |
| 7 | 7 | "Life With the Granvelles"; Transliteration: "Guranveru-ke de no Hibi" (Japanese: グランヴェル家での日々) | Yoshihide Ibata | Daishiro Tanimura | Ryoji Fujiwara | February 21, 2026 |
| 8 | 8 | "Huntsman"; Transliteration: "Shuryō-ban" (Japanese: 狩猟番) | Kang Seo-ki | Shingo Irie | Ryoji Fujiwara | February 28, 2026 |
| 9 | 9 | "The Murdergalsh"; Transliteration: "Mādāgarushu" (Japanese: マーダーガルシュ) | Akira Kato | Daishiro Tanimura | Kinomiya & Tamagawa Masato | March 7, 2026 |
| 10 | 10 | "The Noble's Duty"; Transliteration: "Kizoku no Tsutome" (Japanese: 貴族の務め) | Sumika Takase | Shingo Irie | Ogawa Yuki | March 14, 2026 |
| 11 | 11 | "Sneak Attack"; Transliteration: "Shūgeki" (Japanese: 襲撃) | Sumika Takase | Shingo Irie | Motohiro Abe | March 21, 2026 |
| 12 | 12 | "The Escape"; Transliteration: "Tōhikō" (Japanese: 逃避行) | Mitsuyo Yokono | Daishiro Tanimura | Ogawa Yuki | March 28, 2026 |

===== Season 2 (2026) =====
| No. overall | No. in season | Title | Directed by | Written by | Storyboarded by | Original release date |
|---|---|---|---|---|---|---|
| 13 | 1 | "Off to Academy City!"; Transliteration: "Gakuen Toshi e!" (Japanese: 学園都市へ！) | Sumika Takase | Daishirō Tanimura | Motohiro Abe | July 4, 2026 |
| 14 | 2 | "A New Friend"; Transliteration: "Aratana Deai" (Japanese: 新たな出会い) | Oh Su-jin | Shingo Irie | Motohiro Abe | July 11, 2026 |
| 15 | 3 | "Conquer the Dungeon"; Transliteration: "Danjon o Kōryaku Seyo" (Japanese: ダンジョンを攻略せよ) | Oh Eun-soo | Daishirō Tanimura | Shinichi Watanabe | July 18, 2026 |
| 16 | 4 | "An Order from the Prince"; Transliteration: "Ōtaishi Kara no Sasoi" (Japanese: 王太子からの誘い) | Yoshihide Ibata | Shingo Irie | Yoshihide Ibata | July 25, 2026 |
| 17 | 5 | "The Sovereign of Spirits' Prophecy"; Transliteration: "Seirei-ō no Yogen" (Japanese: 精霊王の予言) | Mitsuyo Yokono | Daishirō Tanimura | Motohiro Abe | August 1, 2026 |
| 18 | 6 | "Showdown At The Academy Tournament"; Transliteration: "Kessen! Gakuen Bujutsu Taikai" (Japanese: 決戦！ 学園武術大会) | Shin Jae-ik & Kento Suzuki | Shingo irie | Makoto Tamagawa, Motohiro Abe & Shinya Kawabe | August 8, 2026 |
| 19 | 7 | "Onward To Rohzenheim"; Transliteration: "Rosenheim e" (Japanese: ローゼンヘイムへ) | Sumika Takase | Daishirō Tanimura | Shinichi Watanabe | August 15, 2026 |
| 20 | 8 | "The Battle of Tiamo"; Transliteration: "Tiamo Kōbōsen" (Japanese: ティアモ攻防戦) | Oh Eun-soo, Shin Jae-ik & Kento Suzuki | Shingo Irie | Toshiya Nīdome | August 22, 2026 |
| 21 | 9 | "The Demons of Lapolka"; Transliteration: "Raporuka no Mazoku-tachi" (Japanese: ラポルカの魔族たち) | Yoshihide Ibata | Daishirō Tanimura | Shinji Ishihira | August 29, 2026 |
| 22 | 10 | "Plentiful Prayers"; Transliteration: "Inori ga Michite" (Japanese: 祈りが満ちて) | Shin Jae-ik & Kento Suzuki | Shingo Irie | Yūki Ogawa | September 5, 2026 |
| 23 | 11 | "The Liberated"; Transliteration: "Kaihōsha" (Japanese: 開放者) | Honami Inamura | Shingo Irie | Shinji Ishihira | September 12, 2026 |
| 24 | 12 | "Extra Skill"; Transliteration: "Ekusutora Sukiru" (Japanese: エクストラスキル) | Oh Eun-soo & Kento Suzuki | Daishirō Tanimura | Motohiro Abe | September 19, 2026 |
| 25 | 13 | "Summoner of the Beginning"; Transliteration: "Hajimari no Shōkanshi" (Japanese: はじまりの召喚士) | Sumika Takase & Mitsuyo Yokono | Daishirō Tanimura | Shinichi Watanabe & Makoto Tamagawa | September 26, 2026 |

== Reception ==
The series won the grand prize at the 2nd Earth Star Novel Award in 2020.

By December 2024, the series had over 1.6 million copies in circulation.

== See also ==
- Chronicles of an Aristocrat Reborn in Another World, another light novel series with the same illustrator
