= Hina Tachibana =

Japanese voice actress

- 立花 日菜
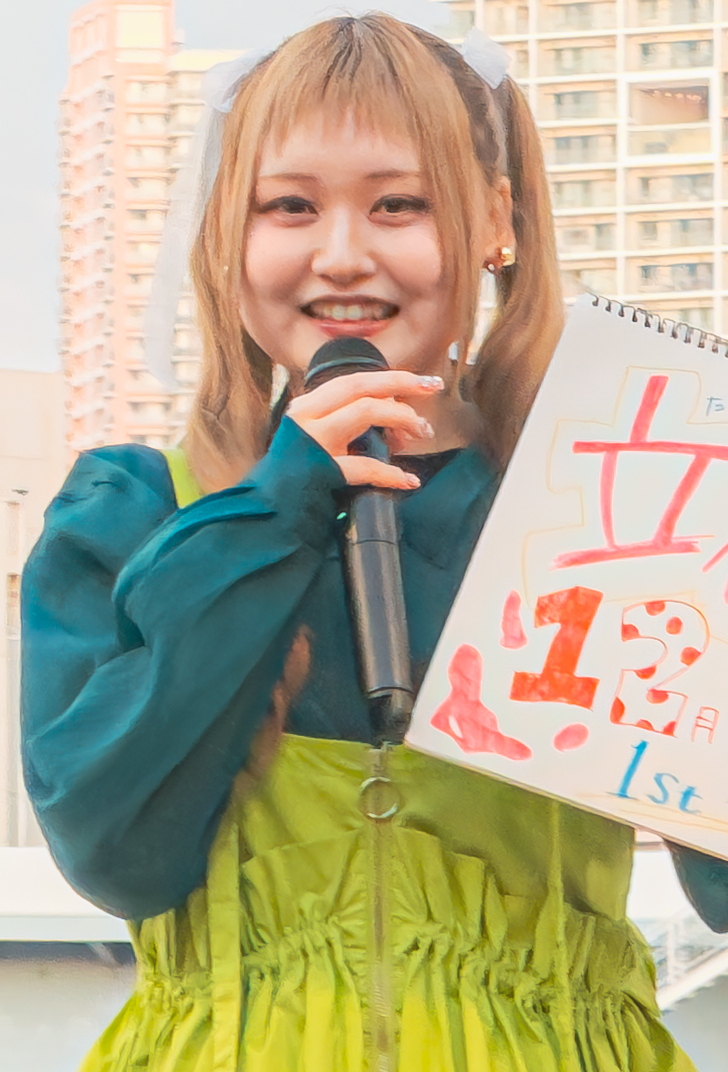
- Tachibana in 2025
- Born: June 14; Miyagi Prefecture, Japan
- Occupations: Voice actress; singer
- Years active: 2018–present
- Agent: Arts Vision
- Notable work: The Idolmaster Cinderella Girls: Starlight Stage as Nagi Hisakawa; If My Favorite Pop Idol Made It to the Budokan, I Would Die as Maina Ichii; Cue! as Rie Maruyama; My Tiny Senpai as Shiori Katase
- Musical career
- Genres: J-pop; Anison
- Instrument: Vocals
- Years active: 2024–present
- Label: Pony Canyon
- Website: tachibanahina.com

Hina Tachibana (立花 日菜, Tachibana Hina; born June 14) is a Japanese voice actress and singer. She is known for her roles as Nagi Hisakawa in The Idolmaster Cinderella Girls, Maina Ichii in If My Favorite Pop Idol Made It to the Budokan, I Would Die, Rie Maruyama in Cue!, and Shiori Katase in My Tiny Senpai.

== Career ==
Tachibana began her voice acting career after graduating from the Japan Narration Actor Institute. Her first role was as a background character in the anime series Zombie Land Saga in 2018. Her first named role was as the character Nagi Hisakawa in the mobile game The Idolmaster Cinderella Girls: Starlight Stage. Her first major anime followed in 2019 when she voiced Maina Ichii in If My Favorite Pop Idol Made It to the Budokan, I Would Die. Later that year she was cast as Rie Maruyama in the mobile game Cue!.

In 2021, Tachibana played Satono Diamond in the mobile game and anime series Umamusume: Pretty Derby. In 2022 she reprised the role of Rie Maruyama for the anime series adaptation of Cue!.

Tachibana made her debut as an individual singer in 2024 under Pony Canyon with the song "I'm Game!", which is the ending theme song of Gods' Games We Play.

== Filmography ==
=== Anime ===
2018

- Zombie Land Saga, Girl

2019

- The Idolmaster Cinderella Girls Theater Climax Season, Nagi Hisakawa

2020

- If My Favorite Pop Idol Made It to the Budokan, I Would Die, Maina Ichii

2021

- Umamusume: Pretty Derby, Satono Diamond

2022

- Cue!, Rie Maruyama

2023

- My Tiny Senpai, Shiori Katase
- The Great Cleric, Nanaera

2024

- Chained Soldier, Nei Ōkawamura
- Gods' Games We Play, Pearl Diamond
- The Strongest Magician in the Demon Lord's Army Was a Human, Satie
- The Healer Who Was Banished From His Party, Is, in Fact, the Strongest, Armia

2025

- Übel Blatt, Peepi
- Our Last Crusade or the Rise of a New World, Ashe

2026

- Jack-of-All-Trades, Party of None, Sophia Clodel

=== Video games ===
2019

- The Idolmaster Cinderella Girls: Starlight Stage, Nagi Hisakawa
- Cue!, Rie Maruyama

2021

- Umamusume: Pretty Derby, Satono Diamond
- Lost Judgment, Minato Tōdō

2022

- Arknights, Pudding

2023

- Towa Tsugai, Enaga
- Takt Op. Symphony, Pomp and Circumstance
- Puella Magi Madoka Magica Side Story: Magia Record, Chizuru

2024

- Azur Lane, Daizen
- Aether Gazer, Thoth

2025

- Trickcal: Chibi Go, Diana
- Atelier Resleriana: The Red Alchemist & the White Guardian, Rias Eidreise

=== Live-action film ===
- Nemurubaka: Hypnic Jerks (2025), Nabiko (voice)
