= Higehiro =

Japanese light novel series

- Higehiro: After Being Rejected, I Shaved and Took in a High School Runaway
- First light novel volume cover featuring Sayu Ogiwara

ひげを剃る。そして女子高生を拾う。 (Hige o Soru Soshite Joshi Kōsei o Hirou)
- Genre: Romantic comedy
- Novel series
- Written by: Shimesaba
- Published by: Kakuyomu
- Original run: March 8, 2017 – August 3, 2018 (discontinued)
- Light novel
- Written by: Shimesaba
- Illustrated by: booota (vol. 1–3 & 5); Imaru Adachi (vol. 4)
- Published by: Kadokawa Shoten
- English publisher: NA: Kadokawa (digital) Yen Press
- Imprint: Kadokawa Sneaker Bunko
- Original run: February 1, 2018 – June 1, 2021
- Volumes: 5
- Manga
- Written by: Shimesaba
- Illustrated by: Imaru Adachi
- Published by: Kadokawa Shoten
- English publisher: NA: One Peace Books
- Magazine: Monthly Shōnen Ace
- Original run: November 26, 2018 – January 24, 2025
- Volumes: 13
- Light novel

Hige o Soru Soshite Joshi Kōsei o Hirou Each Stories
- Written by: Shimesaba
- Illustrated by: booota
- Published by: Kadokawa Shoten
- Imprint: Kadokawa Sneaker Bunko
- Published: December 26, 2020
- Manga

Hige o Soru Soshite Joshi Kōsei o Hirou Each Stories
- Written by: Shimesaba
- Illustrated by: Baramatsu Hitomi
- Published by: Kadokawa Shoten
- Magazine: Shōnen Ace Plus
- Original run: March 5, 2021 – April 17, 2022
- Volumes: 2
- Anime television series
- Directed by: Manabu Kamikita (Note: No director named Manabu Kamikita (上北学) exists. The name is a pseudonym of an unknown director.)
- Written by: Deko Akao
- Music by: Tomoki Kikuya
- Studio: Project No.9
- Licensed by: Crunchyroll (streaming); SA/SEA: Muse Communication
- Original network: AT-X, Tokyo MX, BS11
- English network: US: Crunchyroll Channel
- Original run: April 5, 2021 – June 28, 2021
- Episodes: 13
- Light novel

Another side story – Yuzuha Mishima
- Written by: Shimesaba
- Illustrated by: booota
- Published by: Kadokawa Shoten
- Imprint: Kadokawa Sneaker Bunko
- Published: December 1, 2021
- Light novel

Another side story – Airi Goto
- Written by: Shimesaba
- Illustrated by: booota
- Published by: Kadokawa Shoten
- Imprint: Kadokawa Sneaker Bunko
- Original run: April 28, 2022 – September 1, 2023
- Volumes: 2
- icon

Higehiro, short for Higehiro: After Being Rejected, I Shaved and Took in a High School Runaway (Japanese: ひげを剃る。そして女子高生を拾う。, Hepburn: Hige o Soru Soshite Joshi Kōsei o Hirou; lit. 'I Shaved the Beard Then Picked Up a High School Girl'), is a Japanese romantic comedy light novel series written by Shimesaba and illustrated by booota. It was serialized online between March 2017 and August 2018 on Kadokawa's user-generated novel publishing website Kakuyomu. It was later published by Kadokawa Shoten with five volumes between February 2018 and June 2021 under their Kadokawa Sneaker Bunko imprint.

Set in Suginami Ward in Tokyo, the story follows a 26-year-old salaryman who, after being rejected by his long-time crush, encounters a runaway high school girl from Hokkaido sitting under a telephone pole. Despite her attempts to seduce him in exchange for a place to stay, he refuses her advances but allows her to live in his apartment rent-free in exchange for handling everyday household chores, beginning a complex, platonic relationship.

A manga adaptation with art by Imaru Adachi was serialized in Kadokawa Shoten's shōnen manga magazine Monthly Shōnen Ace from November 2018 to January 2025. The light novel is licensed in North America by Kadokawa and Yen Press. The manga is licensed by One Peace Books. An anime television series adaptation by Project No.9 aired from April to June 2021.

== Plot ==
Handsome young salaryman Yoshida had finally gathered up the courage to confess his feelings for his employer and longtime crush Airi Gotou. Sadly though, he ended up rejected and goes out drinking with his co-worker/best friend Hashimoto to relieve himself of his sorrows. While heading back home in a drunken state, he meets Sayu Ogiwara, a teenage high school girl who asks to spend the night with him. He lets her in out of pity and because he is too exhausted to argue, saying to himself that he will chase her out tomorrow. The next day now sobered up, Yoshida asks Sayu how she ended up at his apartment: she reveals that she had run away from her family and home in Hokkaido and has been prostituting herself to random men in exchange for a place to stay. Now knowing her backstory, Yoshida, feeling bad for her, finds himself unable to kick her out of his house and their time of living together begins.

== Characters ==
Yoshida (吉田)
Voiced by: Kazuyuki Okitsu (Japanese); Alex Hom (English)
A 26-year-old handsome salaryman with short black hair, brown eyes, a pretty decent face and a well-built frame. Living alone most of his life, Yoshida grew to be a highly independent person. He is an exceptional and reliable employee who is always dedicated to his work; he puts in overtime daily and even helps lighten the load of tasks of his colleagues. He was rejected by a coworker and while on the way home, drunk, he saw a teenage girl under a lamppost. He was a member of his school's baseball team in high school and dated Aoi Kanda.
Sayu Ogiwara (荻原 沙優, Ogiwara Sayu)
Voiced by: Kana Ichinose (Note: Sayu's voice is provided by Saori Hayami in a 2018 commercial, and by Nao Tōyama in a 2019 commercial, Saori Ōnishi provides her voice in an audiobook.) (Japanese); Jill Harris (English)
A beautiful runaway high school student from Asahikawa, Hokkaido who survived by seducing men and sleeping in unfamiliar locations before she met Yoshida under a lamppost. She got to sleep—and then live—in Yoshida's apartment, albeit, in his words, for the time being. She gets a part-time job at a convenience store in Tokyo. She is actually from a wealthy family but left home due to family issues. In Another side story: Airi Gotō, she returns as a university student and confesses to Yoshida, but is rejected in favor of Airi.
Airi Gotō (後藤 愛依梨, Gotō Airi)
Voiced by: Hisako Kanemoto (Japanese); Sarah Roach (English)
Yoshida's boss at the IT company he is working for and his primary love interest. She is a beautiful and mature fair-skinned woman with silky brown hair that is either tied or braided on the right side, rich brown eyes, a beauty mark under her right eye, and huge breasts. At the start of the story, she rejected Yoshida and claimed that she liked someone else, but this was a lie and she had feelings for him. In Another side story: Airi Gotō, she and Yoshida have feelings for each other and resume dating.
Yuzuha Mishima (三島 柚葉, Mishima Yuzuha)
Voiced by: Kaori Ishihara (Japanese); Macy Anne Johnson (English)
Yoshida's junior and mentee at the IT company secretly has romantic feelings for him. She generally has a laid-back personality and remains relaxed and unfazed even if deadlines and tasks are piling up. Although she is highly capable of doing her job efficiently, she opts not to exert effort as she believes overworking will soon just result in death. Instead, she uses the favouritism she gets from her other superiors to her advantage.
Hashimoto (橋本)
Voiced by: Yūsuke Kobayashi (Japanese); Ben Balmaceda (English)
Yoshida's co-worker and friend. He is a young man with black hair and brown eyes. He wears a pair of eyeglasses. He gets along with everyone in their company and is not as serious about work as Yoshida but still gets his job done. He jokes around a lot to lighten the mood and often teases Yoshida.
Asami Yūki (結城 あさみ, Yūki Asami)
Voiced by: Natsumi Kawaida (Japanese); Kelsey Maher (English)
A high school girl and Sayu's best friend, who works part-time at the same convenience store. She is a gyaru. She comes from a wealthy family, but she is not on good terms with them. She aims to be a novelist and remains in contact with Sayu even after she returns to Hokkaido.
Aoi Kanda (神田 蒼, Kanda Aoi)
Yoshida's upperclassman and first girlfriend. She later joins his company.
Kyouya Yaguchi (矢口 鏡夜, Yaguchi Kyouya)
Voiced by: Ryōta Ōsaka
Kyouya was one of Sayu's many hookups who offered for her to stay with him at his place in exchange for sexual favours. He later gets a job at the same convenience store as Sayu and Asami.
Issa Ogiwara (荻原 一颯, Ogiwara Issa)
Voiced by: Kohsuke Toriumi
Sayu's older brother, who is the president and CEO of their family's food company.
Mrs. Ogiwara (沙優と一颯の母, Sayu to Issa no Haha)
Voiced by: Ryoka Yuzuki
Sayu and Issa's mother who works for the Ogiwara Foods Corporation along with her adult son. She seems to care more about Issa's achievements and needs more than her daughter; when Sayu still lived at home (even when she was a child) she rarely showed Sayu any type of parental love or affection, often being harsh and cold towards her (she might have also been abusive, both mentally and physically); she even went as far as to not allowing her daughter to hang out with her friends. Years ago while she was pregnant with Sayu, her husband, who had a knack for constantly cheating on her with other women, had already moved on to someone else and tried to force her to get an abortion but she refused, thus leading to Sayu's birth. To her, Sayu simply became proof as well as a painful reminder that her husband was no longer in her family's life.
Yuuko Masaka (真坂 結子, Masaka Yuuko)
Voiced by: Manaka Iwami (Japanese); Emily Fajardo (English)
One of Sayu's close friends from Hokkaido and classmates from Asahikawa Dairoku High School. Due to her beautiful looks, she was often the victim of bullying by other girls who were jealous of her. Yuuko kills herself by jumping off the school roof, leaving Sayu distraught. The aftermath of her death caused further strain between Sayu and her mother, who believed that Sayu was the one who drove her friend to suicide. Being constantly blamed for her friend's death led Sayu to leave home and became emotionally unstable.

== Media ==
=== Light novels ===
The series was written by Shimesaba and illustrated by booota and was serialized online between March 2017 and August 2018 on Kadokawa's user-generated novel publishing website Kakuyomu. It was later published by Kadokawa Shoten with five volumes between February 2018 and June 2021 under their Kadokawa Sneaker Bunko imprint. It ended in its fifth volume, which was released on June 1, 2021. Kadokawa is publishing the novels digitally in English. Yen Press will also publish their own release of the series.

No.	Original release date	Original ISBN	English release date	English ISBN
1	February 1, 2018	978-4-04-106475-7	July 19, 2022	978-1-97-534419-1
2	June 1, 2018	978-4-04-107084-0	November 22, 2022	978-1-97-534421-4
3	January 1, 2019	978-4-04-107085-7	March 21, 2023	978-1-97-534423-8
4	August 1, 2020	978-4-04-108260-7	July 18, 2023	978-1-97-534425-2
5	June 1, 2021	978-4-04-108262-1	November 21, 2023	978-1-97-534427-6

==== Spin-off ====
No.	Title	Japanese release date	Japanese ISBN
1	Each Stories	December 26, 2020	978-4-04-108261-4
2	Another side story: Yuzuha Mishima	December 1, 2021	978-4-04-111763-7
3	Another side story: Airi Gotō (Part 1)	April 28, 2022	978-4-04-111764-4
4	Another side story: Airi Gotō (Part 2)	September 1, 2023	978-4-04-112787-2

=== Manga ===
A manga adaptation with art by Imaru Adachi was serialized in Kadokawa Shoten's shōnen manga magazine Monthly Shōnen Ace from November 26, 2018, to January 24, 2025. It was collected in thirteen tankōbon volumes. In March 2021, One Peace Books announced their license to the manga in English and would begin releasing the series in October 2021.

No.	Original release date	Original ISBN	English release date	English ISBN
1	May 25, 2019	978-4-04-108351-2	October 14, 2021	978-1-64-273144-6
2	October 26, 2019	978-4-04-108857-9	December 15, 2021	978-1-64-273145-3
3	May 26, 2020	978-4-04-109452-5	April 21, 2022	978-1-64-273162-0
4	November 25, 2020	978-4-04-109453-2	July 26, 2022	978-1-64-273163-7
5	March 26, 2021	978-4-04-111204-5	October 18, 2022	978-1-64-273194-1
6	August 26, 2021	978-4-04-111707-1	December 6, 2022	978-1-64-273195-8
7	February 25, 2022	978-4-04-111708-8	April 25, 2023	978-1-64-273234-4
8	July 26, 2022	978-4-04-112721-6	September 14, 2023	978-1-64-273283-2
9	December 26, 2022	978-4-04-113268-5	February 24, 2024	978-1-64-273336-5
10	June 26, 2023	978-4-04-113828-1	March 26, 2024	978-1-64-273337-2
11	February 26, 2024	978-4-04-114553-1	May 6, 2025	978-1-64-273446-1
12	October 25, 2024	978-4-04-115179-2	November 18, 2025	978-1-64-273487-4
13	March 24, 2025	978-4-04-115821-0	July 14, 2026	978-1-64-273541-3

==== Each Stories ====
No.	Japanese release date	Japanese ISBN
1	August 26, 2021	978-4-04-111709-5
2	February 25, 2022	978-4-04-112197-9

=== Anime ===
On December 26, 2019, an anime adaptation was announced by Kadokawa Sneaker Bunko. The adaptation was revealed to be a television series produced by Dream Shift, animated by Project No.9 and directed by a director under the pseudonym of Manabu Kamikita, with Deko Akao handling series composition, and Takayuki Noguchi designing the characters. Tomoki Kikuya is composing the series' music. The series aired from April 5 to June 28, 2021, on AT-X, Tokyo MX, and BS11. Dialogue+ performed the series' opening theme song "Omoide Shiritori", while Kaori Ishihara performed the series' ending theme song "Plastic Smile". It ran for 13 episodes.

Higehiro was released on home video in Japan with the first volume of the Blu-ray/DVD released on June 9, 2021.

==== English release and international distribution ====
Crunchyroll streamed the series outside of Southeast Asia. The English dub, starring Alex Hom and Jill Harris and directed by Jonathan Rigg, debuted on Crunchyroll on July 30, 2022. The DVD/Blu-ray of the series was released in Europe by Crunchyroll EMEA on June 16, 2023.

Muse Communication has licensed the series in Southeast Asia and South Asia.

==== Episodes ====
No.	Title (Note: All English titles are taken from Crunchyroll.)	Directed by	Written by	Original release date
1	"The Teenage Girl Beneath the Lamplight"; Transliteration: "Denchū no Shita no Joshi Kōsei" (Japanese: 電柱の下の女子高生)	Geisei Morita	Deko Akao	April 5, 2021
Yoshida is a 26-year-old salaryman who works for an IT company. On a certain weekend, he confesses his feelings for Gotou Airi, his superior at his workplace, but is disappointed when his love of five years ends in a heartbreak. He decides to drink his sorrow away in a pub while complaining about his heartbreak to his colleague, Hashimoto. On his way home, Yoshida bumps into a high school girl, Sayu, who is sitting on the street under a telephone pole. Drunk as a skunk, Yoshida half-consciously allows Sayu, who has no place to stay, to spend a night in his house.
2	"Cell Phone"; Transliteration: "Keitai" (Japanese: 携帯)	Tarō Kubo	Deko Akao	April 12, 2021
Feeling sorry for the homeless Sayu, Yoshida decides to have her stay in his house within condition she does household chores for him. They continue to live together awkwardly but somehow comfortably. During a holiday and on the way to the groceries, Yoshida notices that Sayu does not have a cell phone. When he asks her why she refrains from answering with an uncomfortable smile.
3	"Living Together"; Transliteration: "Kyōdō Seikatsu" (Japanese: 共同生活)	Hodaka Kuramoto	Deko Akao	April 19, 2021
Yoshida does not seem to care about his inconvenience or asking Sayu in return. Because she cannot bring herself to understand his intention, Sayu feels bewildered. One night, she receives a message from Yoshida that he will be home late. Sayu realises that there is a possibility that he may have a girlfriend. The thought of losing her "place" makes Sayu's heart shake with anxiety.
4	"Part-Time Job"; Transliteration: "Baito" (Japanese: バイト)	Akira Katō	Yūsuke Kaneko	April 26, 2021
Yoshida and Sayu reveal their feelings to each other and close the distance between them. Sayu starts a part-time job at a nearby convenience store. Asami Yuki, who is a senior at the store and is in the same grade as Sayu, takes good care of her and soon becomes friends with her. After work, Asami hears that Sayu is living with Yoshida, and suddenly decides to visit his room to see what kind of person Yoshida is.
5	"Reality"; Transliteration: "Genjitsu" (Japanese: 現実)	Aya Kobayashi	Yūsuke Kaneko	May 3, 2021
Yoshida receives an unexpected confession from Gotou, who supposedly rejected him in the first episode. Yoshida is pressured by Gotou's strong words, "I want to meet Sayu", and invites her to his home. On the other hand, Sayu cannot hide her confusion as she does not understand Gotou's true intentions. Sayu nods her head when Gotou wants to talk to her alone. However, what Gotou says to her is a harsh reality.
6	"Starry Sky"; Transliteration: "Hoshizora" (Japanese: 星空)	Yūya Horiuchi	Satoru Sugisawa	May 10, 2021
After confiding in Gotou about her doubts and fears, Sayu thinks about her future. She gradually becomes more positive, but then she meets someone who knows about her past that she wants to forget. It was a man named Yaguchi who used to let Sayu stay at his house. Sayu rejects Yaguchi's invitation, but he threatens to reveal her past and coerces her to take him to her place.
7	"Yearning"; Transliteration: "Renbo" (Japanese: 恋慕)	Tarō Kubo	Deko Akao	May 17, 2021
Sayu reconciles with Yaguchi and stays good friends with Asami. Yoshida goes about his daily life at his own pace, not noticing Mishima's true feelings for him. Meanwhile, Sayu becomes unsure about coming home, after finally finding the happiness she had always wanted. All of a sudden, Sayu finds out that someone has been looking for her. She realizes that time is against her.
8	"Summer Festival"; Transliteration: "Natsumatsuri" (Japanese: 夏祭り)	Hodaka Kuramoto	Deko Akao	May 24, 2021
Issa, Sayu's brother, is looking for her. While heading home from shopping, Sayu meets with Mishima, who invites her to have a chat together. On her way home with Yoshida, Sayu noticed a poster for a nearby summer festival. They decided to attend the festival together.
9	"Past"; Transliteration: "Kako" (Japanese: 過去)	Akira Katō	Yūsuke Kaneko	May 31, 2021
Issa comes to get Sayu home. After a discussion with her brother, Yoshida asks for Sayu to be given more time to think about what she wants to do. Sayu faces Issa to provide him with her answer. Feeling Sayu's determination and belief in Yoshida's generosity, Issa agrees to give her more time to stay. Sayu then meets up with Yoshida and Asami to tell her whole story until right before she met Yoshida.
10	"Proof"; Transliteration: "Shōmei" (Japanese: 証明)	Aya Kobayashi	Yūsuke Kaneko	June 7, 2021
Yoshida knows Sayu's dark past about her late friend and her mother's rejection. Yoshida and Sayu continue to live together for the past few days, while covering up their feelings for each other. Issa thanks Yoshida for her decision to take time alone to escort Sayu back home.
11	"Resolve"; Transliteration: "Kakugo" (Japanese: 覚悟)	Yasuyuki Ōishi	Deko Akao	June 14, 2021
Yoshida decides to come along with Sayu and her brother Issa to visit their home, for Sayu's sake and his own. Sayu and Yoshida spent some time together and reminiscence about their experience so far. While on their way, Sayu decides that there is a place she wants to stop by first. The high school that Sayu enrolled in. The place that changed her life forever.
12	"Mother"; Transliteration: "Hahaoya" (Japanese: 母親)	Geisei Morita	Deko Akao	June 21, 2021
Sayu's mother was waiting for her when she came home, and they sit down for a discussion. Yoshida finally understood the true conflict Sayu is facing which was previously unbeknownst to him. While Yoshida is furious with her mother, he knows what is best for Sayu and decides to speak his mind.
13	"Future"; Transliteration: "Mirai" (Japanese: 未来)	Manabu Kamikita	Deko Akao	June 28, 2021
Yoshida convinced Sayu's mother to somehow make up with her daughter. With that, Sayu's long journey away from home came to an end and it's time finally to say goodbye to Yoshida.

== Reception ==
The light novel series has a total of more than 400,000 copies in circulation, including digital copies. The series appeared at 4th in the bunkobon edition of Takarajimasha's annual light novel guide book Kono Light Novel ga Sugoi! in 2019.

== See also ==
- Loner Life in Another World: light novel series illustrated by the same illustrator
