= Kyōka Moriya =

Japanese voice actress (born 1995)

- 守屋 亨香
- Born: May 22, 1995 (age 31); Azumino, Nagano Prefecture, Japan
- Occupations: Voice actress; singer
- Years active: 2013 - present
- Agent: Tokyo Actor's Consumer's Cooperative Society
- Notable work: Dropout Idol Fruit Tart as Hemo Midori; Cue! as Shiho Kaho; Private Tutor to the Duke's Daughter as Ellie Walker

Kyōka Moriya (守屋 亨香, Moriya Kyōka; born May 22, 1995) is a Japanese voice actress and singer from Nagano Prefecture who is affiliated with the Tokyo Actor's Consumer's Cooperative Society. Beginning her career as a child actress in commercials, she later became a voice actress, appearing in anime series such as Dropout Idol Fruit Tart, Cue!, and Private Tutor to the Duke's Daughter. She is also a member of the music group Dialogue.

== Biography ==
Moriya was born in Azumino, Nagano Prefecture, on May 22, 1995. She started her entertainment career in elementary school, appearing as an actress in commercials and television series. Her work made her commute between Azumino and Tokyo for entertainment activities. As she grew older, she found it difficult to pass auditions for roles due to her having a distinctive voice. Upon the suggestion of her agency she decided to try voice acting. She passed voice acting audition, which made her decide to become a voice actress full-time. When she was in high school, she moved to Matsumoto, Nagano.

In 2019, Moriya became a member of the music group Dialogue, a unit composed of voice actresses. She also played the role of Shiho Kano in the mobile game Cue! In 2020, she played the role of Hemo Midori in the anime series Dropout Idol Fruit Tart, being one of the series' theme song singers as the in-universe idol group Fruit Tart. In 2022 she reprised the role of Shiho Kano for the anime adaptation of Cue! In 2025 she played the roles of Ellie Walker in Private Tutor to the Duke's Daughter and Michiru Kusagakure in A Ninja and an Assassin Under One Roof.

== Personal life ==
Moriya is skilled in handicrafts and calligraphy, and is a fan of professional wrestling and anime. When she first got her driver's license, she cosplayed as the character Nico Yazawa from Love Live! for her driver's license photo.

== Filmography ==
=== Anime ===
2020

- Dropout Idol Fruit Tart, Hemo Midori

2022

- Cue!, Shiho Kano

2025

- Private Tutor to the Duke's Daughter, Ellie Walker
- A Ninja and an Assassin Under One Roof, Michiru Kusagakure

=== Video games ===
2019

- Cue!, Shiho Kaho

2027

- Honkai: Nexus Anima, Maple Manybell
