= Cue! =

Japanese mobile game and anime

- Video game logo
- Genre: Yuri
- Video game
- Developer: Liber Entertainment
- Genre: Simulation game, Seinen
- Platform: Android, iOS
- Released: JP: October 25, 2019
- Anime television series
- Directed by: Shin Katagai
- Written by: Tatsuhiko Urahata
- Music by: Ryousuke Nakanishi
- Studio: Yumeta Company; Graphinica
- Licensed by: Crunchyroll
- Original network: MBS, TBS, BS-TBS, AT-X
- Original run: January 8, 2022 – June 25, 2022
- Episodes: 24

Cue! (stylized in all caps) is a Japanese mobile game produced by Liber Entertainment. It launched on iOS and Android systems on October 25, 2019. The game is a simulation game where players can train up-and-coming voice actors. An anime television series adaptation by Yumeta Company and Graphinica aired from January to June 2022 on the Animeism programming block.

== Characters ==
=== Flower ===
Haruna Mutsuishi (六石 陽菜, Mutsuishi Haruna)
Voiced by: Yurina Uchiyama
Haruna is an aspiring voice actress in high school. She was inspired to become a voice actress after she saw a certain work.
Maika Takatori (鷹取 舞花, Takatori Maika)
Voiced by: Nene Hieda
Shiho Kano (鹿野 志穂, Kano Shiho)
Voiced by: Kyōka Moriya
Honoka Tsukii (月居 ほのか, Tsukii Honoka)
Voiced by: Yuna Ogata
Honoka is a university student who comes from a family that runs a shrine.

=== Bird ===
Yūki Tendō (天童 悠希, Tendō Yūki)
Voiced by: Ayaka Takamura
Yūki is an up-and-coming voice actress. Her family runs a restaurant, and she decided to pursue a voice acting career against their wishes.
Chisa Akagawa (赤川 千紗, Akagawa Chisa)
Voiced by: Satsuki Miyahara
Airi Eniwa (恵庭 あいり, Eniwa Airi)
Voiced by: Mayu Iizuka
Yuzuha Kujō (九条 柚葉, Kujō Yuzuha)
Voiced by: Manatsu Murakami

=== Wind ===
Miharu Yomine (夜峰 美晴, Yomine Miharu)
Voiced by: Yukari Anzai
Miharu is a university student and a member of Wind. During the events of the series, she accepts an offer to take up a short-term piano course in Vienna, Austria, but still can participate in group activities via the internet.
Aya Kamuro (神室 絢, Kamuro Aya)
Voiced by: Saki Matsuda
Mahoro Miyaji (宮路 まほろ, Miyaji Mahoro)
Voiced by: Megumi Yamaguchi
Riko Hinakura (日名倉 莉子, Hinakura Riko)
Voiced by: Arisa Tsuruno

=== Moon ===
Rie Maruyama (丸山 利恵, Maruyama Rie)
Voiced by: Hina Tachibana
Rie is an 18-year-old freeter with a chūnibyō personality.
Satori Utsugi (宇津木 聡里, Utsugi Satori)
Voiced by: Ami Komine
Satori is a 19-year-old university student who wants to follow in the footsteps of her voice actress mother.
Rinne Myōjin (明神 凛音, Myōjin Rinne)
Voiced by: Mai Satō
Mei Tōmi (遠見 鳴, Tōmi Mei)
Voiced by: Rio Tsuchiya
Mei is a 17-year-old aspiring voice actress who originally came from France.

=== Other characters ===
Rio Isuzu (五十鈴 りお, Isuzu Rio)
Voiced by: Aya Suzaki
Rio serves the manager for the voice actresses at the Air Blue agency.
Masaki Ōtori (鳳 真咲, Ōtori Masaki)
Voiced by: Yoko Hikasa
Masaki serves as the president of Air Blue agency.

== Media ==
=== Game ===
A mobile game by Liber Entertainment was released on October 25, 2019. The game temporarily ended service on April 30, 2021, in order to revise gameplay elements. On July 23, 2022, it was announced that efforts to relaunch the game had been discontinued and the activities of the Air Blue girl groups would be suspended.

=== Anime ===
An anime television series adaptation was announced on November 1, 2020. It is produced by Yumeta Company and Graphinica and directed by Shin Katagai, with Tatsuhiko Urahata overseeing the series' scripts, Motohiro Taniguchi designing the characters, and Ryosuke Nakanishi composing the music. It aired from January 8 to June 25, 2022, on the Animeism programming block on MBS, TBS, and BS-TBS. The first opening theme is "Start Line", and the first ending theme is "Hajimari no Kane no Ne ga Narihibiku Sora". The second opening theme is "Tomorrow's Diary", and the second ending theme is "Yumeda Yori." All songs are performed by the group Airblue. Crunchyroll streamed the series outside of Asia.

==== Episode list ====
No.	Title	Directed by (Note: Information is taken from the ending credits of each episode.)	Written by	Storyboarded by	Original release date (Note: MBS lists the series premiere at 25:55 on January 7, 2022, which is effectively 1:55 a.m. JST on January 8.)
1	"The Beginning of the Beginning"; Transliteration: "Hajimari no Hajimari" (Japanese: はじまりのはじまり)	Shin Katagai; Takushi Shikatani	Tatsuhiko Urahata	Shin Katagai	January 8, 2022 (Note: This episode aired at 2:25 a.m. JST, 30 minutes after the original air time.)
2	"Their Respective Colors"; Transliteration: "Sorezore no Iro" (Japanese: それぞれの色)	Rin Teraoka	Tatsuhiko Urahata	Royden B	January 15, 2022
3	"This Meeting Is Destiny"; Transliteration: "Kono Deai wa Unmei" (Japanese: この出会いは運命)	Yoshifumi Sueda	Tatsuhiko Urahata	Yoshifumi Sueda	January 22, 2022 (Note: This episode aired at 2:10 a.m. JST, 15 minutes after the original air time.)
4	"Lucky Color?"; Transliteration: "Rakkī Karā?" (Japanese: ラッキーカラー？)	Masakazu Sunagawa	Yoriko Tomita	Shigeru Kimiya	January 29, 2022
5	"Starting Line"; Transliteration: "Sutāto Rain" (Japanese: スタートライン)	Yumeta Company Direction Department	Tatsuhiko Urahata	Masatoshi Hakata	February 5, 2022 (Note: This episode aired at 2:05 a.m. JST, 10 minutes after the original air time.)
6	"Ride the Headwind"; Transliteration: "Mukaikaze o Tsukamaete" (Japanese: 向かい風を捕まえて)	Kōjin Ochi	Tatsuhiko Urahata	Kōjin Ochi	February 12, 2022
7	"Moon and Sun"; Transliteration: "Tsuki to Taiyō" (Japanese: 月と太陽)	Masakazu Sunagawa	Tatsuhiko Urahata; Yoriko Tomita	Masakazu Sunagawa	February 19, 2022
8	"100 Percent"; Transliteration: "100 Pāsento" (Japanese: 100ぱーせんと)	Rin Teraoka	Tatsuhiko Urahata	Hidetoshi Yoshida	February 26, 2022
9	"We Can Fly!!!!"	Shunji Yoshida	Shin Katagai	Katsuyuki Kodera	March 5, 2022
10	"Are You Free After This?"; Transliteration: "Kono Ato, Aitemasu ka?" (Japanese: この後、空いてますか？)	Yoshiki Kitai	Tatsuhiko Urahata	Yoshiki Kitai	March 12, 2022
11	"Take Flight, Little Birds!"; Transliteration: "Tobitate Kotori-tachi!" (Japanese: 飛び立て小鳥たち!)	Daisuke Nishimura	Shin Katagai	Kōjin Ochi	March 19, 2022
12	"Fledgling Voice Actresses"; Transliteration: "Seiyū no Tamago" (Japanese: 声優のタマゴ)	Tarō Kubo	Tatsuhiko Urahata	Hiroyuki Hata	March 26, 2022
Special	"Sing about everything"	N/A	N/A	N/A	April 2, 2022
13	"Season 2 Confirmed!?"; Transliteration: "Niki Seisaku Kettei!?" (Japanese: 2期制作決定！？)	Yasutaka Yamamoto	Tatsuhiko Urahata	Yasutaka Yamamoto	April 9, 2022
14	"The Work of Fate"; Transliteration: "Unmei no Shigoto" (Japanese: 運命の仕事)	Takashi Andō	Tatsuhiko Urahata	Royden B	April 16, 2022
15	"Actually, I Won't Take This Job"; Transliteration: "Yappari Kono Shigoto, Okotowari Shimasu" (Japanese: やっぱりこの仕事、お断りします)	Akira Mano	Kasumi Tsuchida	Daisuke Nishimura; Shin Katagai	April 23, 2022
16	"To Me, Now That I'm 20"; Transliteration: "Hatachi ni Natta Watashi e" (Japanese: 二十歳になった私へ)	Takayuki Hamana	Tatsuhiko Urahata	Daisuke Nishimura; Shin Katagai	April 30, 2022
17	"Thunder Woman!"; Transliteration: "Sandā Ūman!" (Japanese: サンダーウーマン！)	Misuzu Hoshino	Tatsuhiko Urahata	Daisuke Nishimura	May 7, 2022
18	"Light"; Transliteration: "Hikari" (Japanese: 光)	Hiromichi Matano	Kasumi Tsuchida	Hiroyuki Hata	May 14, 2022
19	"The Three Little Pigs"; Transliteration: "Sanbiki no Kobuta" (Japanese: 3びきのこぶた)	Naoki Murata	Kasumi Tsuchida	Tatsuji Yamazaki; Moe Katō	May 21, 2022
20	"The Voice"	Jang Hee-kyu; Daisuke Nishimura	Tatsuhiko Urahata	Royden B	May 28, 2022
21	"The Bird That Can't Fly"; Transliteration: "Tobenai Kotori" (Japanese: 飛べない小鳥)	Akira Shimizu	Kasumi Tsuchida	Hiroyuki Hata	June 4, 2022
22	"Forever Friends"	Moe Katō	Shin Katagai	Moe Katō	June 11, 2022
23	"Final Episode"; Transliteration: "Saishūkai" (Japanese: 最終回)	Hibari Kurihara	Tatsuhiko Urahata	Hiroyuki Hata	June 18, 2022
24	"The End of the Beginning"; Transliteration: "Hajimari no Owari" (Japanese: はじまりのおわり)	Daisuke Nishimura	Tatsuhiko Urahata; Shin Katagai	Daisuke Nishimura	June 25, 2022
