= Miru Tights =

Japanese anime series

- Blu-ray cover, featuring (from left to right) Yua Nakabeni, Ren Aikawa, Homi Moegi

みるタイツ (Miru Taitsu)
- Created by: Yom
- Original net animation
- Directed by: Yuki Ogawa
- Written by: Fumiaki Maruto
- Music by: Shade
- Studio: Yokohama Animation Laboratory
- Released: May 11, 2019 – July 27, 2019
- Episodes: 12 + OVA
- Video game

Asobu Tights: Puzzle Lesson
- Developer: Frog X
- Genre: Puzzle
- Platform: Android iOS; Nintendo Switch
- Released: JP: April 22, 2021
- icon

Miru Tights (Japanese: みるタイツ, Hepburn: Miru Taitsu; lit. 'Watch Tights') is a Japanese short-episode anime series by Yokohama Animation Laboratory. It was released from May to July 2019. It is based on a series of illustrations by Japanese artist Yom.

== Plot ==
Three students of Yaegasumi High School, Yua Nakabeni, Ren Aikawa, and Homi Moegi, go about their daily lives. Their adventures are interspersed with leg and foot fetish-oriented fan service.

== Characters ==
Yua Nakabeni (中紅 ユア, Nakabeni Yua)
Voiced by: Yōko Hikasa
An honor student good at studies and sports. She is not talkative, but is a good communicator and likes to tease Ren. She enjoys taking selfies and posting them on social media; she is a well-known cosplayer. She is 168 cm (5 ft 6 in) tall and wears 30 denier tights.
Ren Aikawa (藍川 レン, Aikawa Ren)
Voiced by: Haruka Tomatsu
A normal second-year high school student who tries to act cool, but is also shy and finds it hard to refuse the requests of others. She is 162 cm (5 ft 4 in) tall and wears 60 denier tights. She works part-time as a waitress at a family restaurant.
Homi Moegi (萌黄 ホミ, Moegi Homi)
Voiced by: Aya Suzaki
A bright and bubbly student who often surprises Ren and Yua. She is driven to school and is a member of the swimming club. She is 158 cm (5 ft 2 in) tall and wears 110 denier tights. In episode 10, it is shown she has a brother in junior high school.
Yuiko Okuzumi (奥墨 ユイコ, Okuzumi Yuiko)
Voiced by: Ai Kayano
A 27-year-old homeroom teacher (for Ren's class) who is popular among the students. She is passionate about teaching and guiding her students, but can sometimes be overzealous. In episode 7, it is revealed that Yuiko has a hidden seductive side, as she seduces a male student with an implied footjob in an attempt to get him to focus on his studies.

== Media ==
=== Anime ===
Miru Tights was produced by TRUSS, a limited liability partnership between anime studio Yokohama Animation Lab, anime planning and production company Arch and publisher Getsureisha. The anime was streamed on YouTube worldwide outside of Japan with English and Chinese subtitles. The ending theme is "True Days", with Haruka Tomatsu, Yōko Hikasa and Aya Suzaki each performing a version as their respective characters. A bonus episode is included with the series' Blu-ray, which was released on August 23, 2019.

==== Episode list ====
No.	Title	Animation Director	Screenplay	Storyboard	Original release date
1	"School Commute Tights"; Transliteration: "Tsūgaku Taitsu" (Japanese: 通学タイツ)	Kazuya Aiura	Fumiaki Maruto	Yuki Ogawa	May 11, 2019
The first day of the new semester is rainy, leading to Homi Moegi and Ren Aikawa's tights getting soaked. As Homi goes to get changed, she bumps into Yuiko Okuzumi, the three's homeroom teacher.
2	"Cosplay Selfie Tights"; Transliteration: "Kosupure Jidori Taitsu" (Japanese: コスプレ自撮りタイツ)	Kazuya Aiura	Fumiaki Maruto	Kanta Kamei	May 18, 2019
Yua Nakabeni posts pictures of herself to Twitter as a maid, bunny girl, and a nurse, before posing in a school uniform different from her own (albeit with her whole face visible, much to Ren's dismay).
3	"A Change of Tights"; Transliteration: "Okigae Taitsu" (Japanese: お着換えタイツ)	Kazuya Aiura	Fumiaki Maruto	Yuki Ogawa	May 25, 2019
Homi finds a small rip in her tights and decides to take them off in the classroom. Ren hastily intervenes, but her own tights become ripped in a more compromising location. Yua, having been in a rush, arrives to class with a rip in her tights as well. As the three change, Yua's tights rip again, causing Ren to burst into laughter and Yua to deliberately rip Ren's new tights out of anger. The three later return to class with ripped tights.
4	"Working Tights"; Transliteration: "Hataraku Taitsu" (Japanese: はたらくタイツ)	Kazuya Aiura	Fumiaki Maruto	Kanta Kamei	June 1, 2019
Ren begins a shift at the restaurant where she works. After the restaurant closes, she complains to her manager about the job being busier than anticipated.
5	"Swimsuit Tights"; Transliteration: "Mizugi Taitsu" (Japanese: 水着タイツ)	Kazuya Aiura	Fumiaki Maruto	Yuki Ogawa	June 8, 2019
Homi arrives two hours early to swimming practice, having forgotten about a change in schedule. Having undressed to just her swimsuit and tights before she realizes, she decides to take a nap in the change room and is woken up by the other students. Later, Ren tells Homi to stop flapping her skirt up and down to cool off, but Homi dismisses her request by claiming to be wearing her swimsuit underneath; it then occurs to her that her swimsuit is actually drying off in the club room.
6	"Tatami and Tights"; Transliteration: "Tatami to Taitsu" (Japanese: 畳とタイツ)	Kazuya Aiura	Fumiaki Maruto	Kanta Kamei	June 15, 2019
Yua, Ren, and Homi take part in a Japanese tea ceremony with Okuzumi-sensei as detention. As Ren drinks from the bowl, Yua uses her foot to poke Ren's. Ren prepares to tickle Yua in retaliation, but fails due to the seiza position having caused her legs to fall asleep.
7	"Tempting Tights"; Transliteration: "Yūwaku Taitsu" (Japanese: 誘惑タイツ)	Kazuya Aiura	Fumiaki Maruto	Yuki Ogawa	June 22, 2019
Noticing a male student distracted by her figure, Okuzumi-sensei tells him to stay after class. She expresses concern over his failed quiz before he wakes up in the classroom at night. Okuzumi-sensei is seen putting her tights back on, having apparently "played with" the student that evening.
8	"Foot Massage Tights"; Transliteration: "Ashiura Tsubo Taitsu" (Japanese: 足裏つぼタイツ)	Kazuya Aiura	Fumiaki Maruto	Kanta Kamei	June 29, 2019
Noticing Ren massaging her tired legs, Yua offers to give her an acupressure foot massage instead. Yua's massage eventually drives Ren to orgasm, while a passing Okuzumi-sensei remarks to herself that Ren should keep her voice down.
9	"Kotatsu Tights"; Transliteration: "Kotatsu de Taitsu" (Japanese: こたつでタイツ)	Kazuya Aiura	Fumiaki Maruto	Yuki Ogawa	July 6, 2019
Yua and Homi study at a kotatsu together as Yua's cat lounges inside it.
10	"Earpick Tights"; Transliteration: "Mimikaki Taitsu" (Japanese: 耳かきタイツ)	Kazuya Aiura	Fumiaki Maruto	Kanta Kamei	July 13, 2019
A boy is seen looking at Yom's Yomu Tights (よむタイツ, Yomu Taitsu) artbook before Homi barges into his room, revealing him to be her younger brother. She beckons him to let him clean his ears, and he reluctantly obliges, being flustered by her resting his head on her lap. Internally, he blames Homi for his interest in girls wearing tights.
11	"Valen-tights"; Transliteration: "Barentaitsu" (Japanese: バレンタイツ)	Kazuya Aiura	Fumiaki Maruto	Yuki Ogawa	July 20, 2019
Ren gives Yua a stuffed toy she won at the arcade in return for Yua having given her Valentine's chocolates. In response to Yua's teasing remark that Ren herself would suffice as a present, she wraps herself in a red ribbon, accidentally tying herself up in the process.
12	"Travel Tights"; Transliteration: "Tabi Taitsu" (Japanese: 旅タイツ)	Kazuya Aiura	Fumiaki Maruto	Yuki Ogawa	July 27, 2019
The three girls discuss going on vacation somewhere for spring break, later ordering pizza and falling asleep together. The end credits show them having chosen somewhere in Japan as their travel destination.
OVA	"Cosplay Photoshoot Tights"; Transliteration: "Kosupure Satsuei Taitsu" (Japanese: コスプレ撮影タイツ)	Kazuya Aiura	Fumiaki Maruto	Kanta Kamei	August 22, 2019
Yua has Homi take photos of her for a photo book, with Ren later posing alongside her.

=== Video game ===
A tile-matching puzzle game entitled Asobu Tights: Puzzle Lesson (あそぶタイツ パズルレッスン, Asobu Taitsu Pazuru Ressun; "Play Tights: Puzzle Lesson") was released on iOS, Nintendo Switch, and Android on April 22, 2021.

== See also ==
- Ganbare Doukichan, another series of illustrations by the same illustrator
- It's a Little Late, but I've Fallen in Love with My Childhood Friend, a mixed-media project by the same illustrator
