= Hutan Ashrafian =

British academic

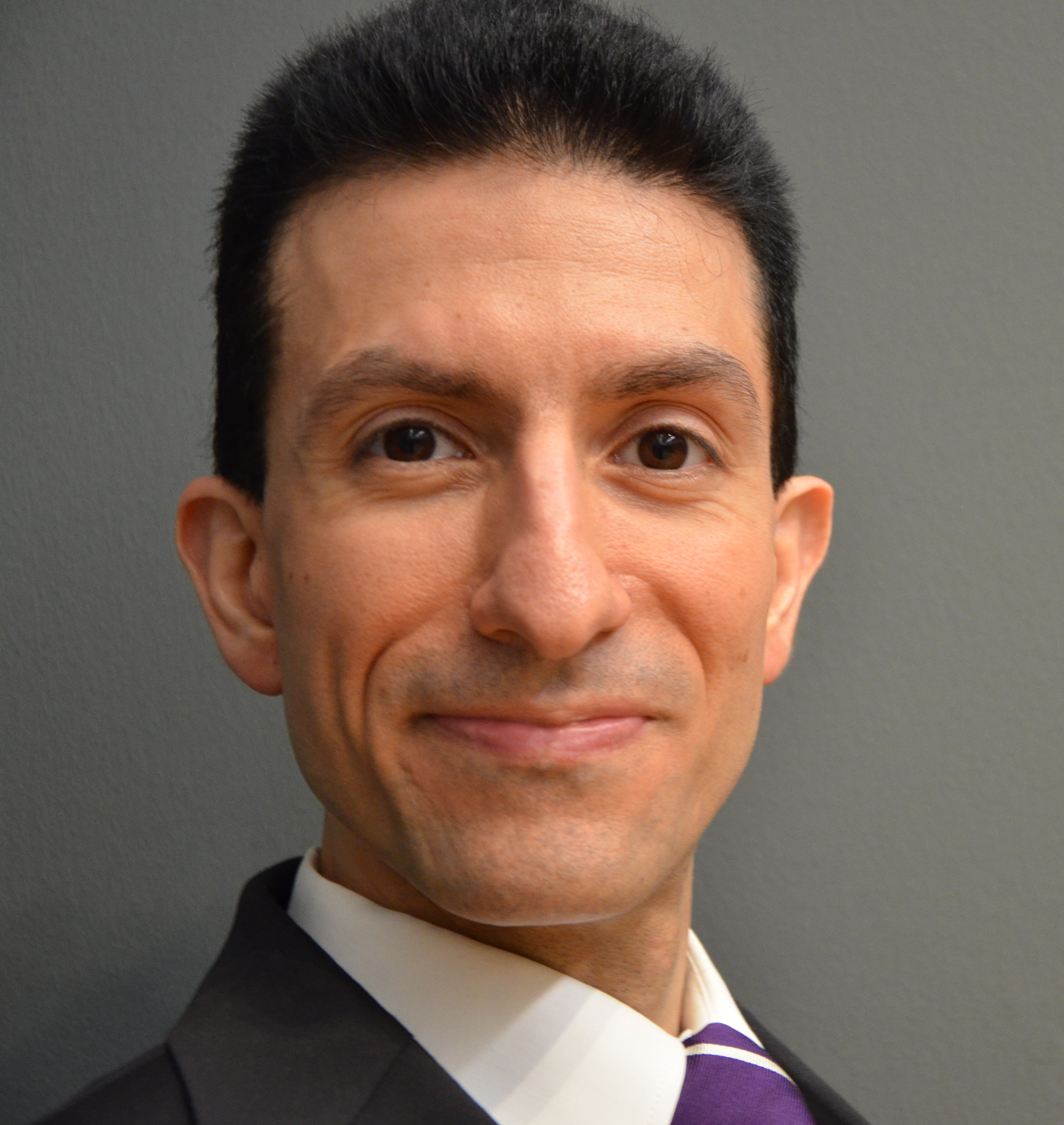
- Ashrafian in 2012
- Education: University College London (BA); Imperial College London (PhD)
- Occupations: Academic, surgeon
- Years active: 2000-present
- Employers: British American Tobacco (2020–2021); Flagship Pioneering
- Known for: Ashrafian thoracotomy, Ashrafian sign aortic regurgitation

Hutan Ashrafian is an academic and cardiothoracic surgeon. He is the current chief scientific officer of Preemptive Health and Medicine at Flagship Pioneering.

The Ashrafian thoracotomy, and the Ashrafian sign aortic regurgitation are named after him. He introduced the AIonAI law for AI.

== Early life and education ==
Ashrafian attended Westminster School. Then he attended University College London, where he completed a BSc degree in immunology and cell pathology, and subsequently a medical degree (MD) in 2000. Following London-based surgical training in paediatric cardiothoracic surgery, robotic surgery, and general surgery with specialist training in bariatric surgery, he finished his Wellcome Trust PhD degree in computational biology and surgery from Imperial College London in 2015. He was then appointed clinical lecturer at National Institute for Health and Care Research.

Ashrafian also holds a Master of Business Administration degree from Warwick Business School, from which he graduated in 2017.

== Career ==
Ashrafian was appointed as chief scientific adviser at the Institute of Global Health Innovation, Imperial College London, in 2017.

In 2017, he co-founded Oxford Medical Products alongside Jan Czenurska to treat obesity with a novel hydrogel.

In September 2020, during the COVID-19 pandemic, he became the chief medical officer of British American Tobacco where he developed a plant-based COVID-19 vaccine with its subsidiary KBP, and served there until August 2021.

In August 2021, he was appointed as the chief scientific officer of Flagship Pioneering.

Ashrafian is Professor of Research Impact at Leeds University Business School, and Senior Research Fellow at Imperial College London. He has worked on documentaries for the BBC and the Smithsonian Channel.

== Research ==
Ashrafian's research is focused on a wide programme ranging from life sciences, philosophy of science and artificial intelligence to ancient history and art. In the life sciences, these focus on mechanistic and clinical therapeutic solutions in obesity, cancer, metabolic syndrome, gut microbiome dysfunction, and musculoskeletal dysfunction. In a research published in 2014, he concluded that social networking programs can help reduce the obesity.

Philosophical contributions include those in areas of physiology, the Simulation Argument, temporal paradoxes in theoretical physics and artificial intelligence interactions (AIonAI law) and psychiatry, AI and politics and the Turing Test. In artificial intelligence field, Ashrafian is one of the authors of STARD-AI protocol, a reporting guideline for artificial intelligence, and QUADAS-AI, a quality assessment tool for artificial intelligence. He is considered one of the leading researchers in artificial intelligence.

In ancient history his work includes books on contextualizing historical events and figures such as Alexander the Great and Xenophon with accurate timelines and scientific explanations of occurrences. This extends in separating myth from legend in classical Greek and Homeric poetry and explaining the medical diseases prominent historical characters such as the Pharaohs Tutankhamun, Akhenaten, Julius Caesar and Henry VIII's multiple marriages and behaviour which have subsequently featured in documentaries where Ashrafian is interviewed.

His 2012 work on the Eighteenth Dynasty of Egypt, theorized that the Pharaoh Tutankhamun had temporal epilepsy that led to his early demise. The book he co-authored with his student Francesco Maria Galassi, named Julius Caesar's Disease: A New Diagnosis. was reviewed by Spyros Retsas of the British Society for the History of Medicine and Neurological Sciences.

In art, he has worked on identifying diseases, and previously unrecognized anatomical and pathological features in more than sixty famous artworks that includes those in the Renaissance, and ancient art. This includes the work of Leonardo da Vinci, where he identified a hernia in Leonardo's famous image the Vitruvian Man.

== Awards and recognition ==
- RCS Arris and Gale award
- Hunterian Prize
- Wellcome Trust Research Fellowship

== Bibliography ==
=== Books ===
- Ashrafian, Hutan (2014). Warrior Origins: The Historical and Legendary Links Between Bodhidharma, Shaolin Kung-Fu, Karate and Ninjutsu
- Ashrafian, Hutan (2015). Surgical Philosophy: Concepts of Modern Surgery Paralleled to Sun Tzu's 'Art of War'
- Galassi, Francesco Maria; Ashrafian, Hutan (2016). Julius Caesar's Disease: A New Diagnosis
- Ashrafian, Hutan (2016). The Diary of Hannibal Barca: A Chronological Retrospect Centered on Polybius' Histories III
- Ashrafian, Hutan; Ahmed, Kamran; Khan, Muhammad Shamim; Athanasiou, Thanos (2016). The Pocket Guide to Neoplasm
- Ashrafian, Hutan (2017). The Diary of Alexander the Great: A Chronological Retrospect Centred On Arrian's Anabasis Alexandri
- Ashrafian, Hutan (2017). The Diary of Xenophon's Anabasis: A Chronological Retrospect
- Ashrafian, Hutan (2017). Advances in Artificial Intelligence and Application
- Ashrafian, Hutan (2018). Surgical Eponyms: For General Surgery FRCS, MRCS, European and American Board Exams
- Ashrafian, Hutan (2018). The Diary of Homer's Odyssey: A Chronological Retrospect
- Ashrafian, Hutan (2019). The Diary of Homer's Iliad: A Chronological Retrospect
- Ashrafian, Hutan (2019). The Diary of Jason and the Argonauts: A Chronological Retrospect of Apollonius Rhodius' Argonuatica
- Lidströmer, Niklas; Ashrafian, Hutan (2022). Artificial Intelligence in Medicine

=== Selected publications ===
- Ashrafian, Hutan et al. (2020). International evaluation of an AI system for breast cancer screening
- Ashrafian, Hutan et al. (2011). Understanding the role of gut microbiome–host metabolic signal disruption in health and disease
- Ashrafian, Hutan et al. (2011). Metabolic surgery profoundly influences gut microbial–host metabolic cross-talk
- Ashrafian, Hutan et al. (2010). Emotional intelligence in medicine: a systematic review through the context of the ACGME competencies
- Ashrafian, Hutan et al. (2012). Technologies for global health
