= Paresthesia =

Dermal sensation with no physical cause

- Other names: Paraesthesia, pins and needles
- Pronunciation: /ˌpærɪsˈθiːziə, -ʒə/
- Specialty: Neurology

Paresthesia (or paraesthesia) is a sensation of the skin that may feel like numbness (hypoesthesia), tingling, pricking, chilling, or burning. It can be temporary or chronic and has many possible underlying causes. Paresthesia is usually painless and can occur anywhere on the body, but does most commonly in the arms and legs.

The most familiar kind of paresthesia is the sensation known as pins and needles after having a limb "fall asleep" (obdormition). This is typically achieved by not moving the limb for a long period of time. Hitting the ulnar nerve (the "funny bone") also induces paresthesias. A less common kind is formication, the sensation of insects crawling on or under the skin.

== Causes ==
=== Transient ===
Paresthesias of the hands, feet, legs, and arms are common transient symptoms. The briefest electric shock type of paresthesia can be caused by an impact on the comparatively unprotected ulnar nerve near the elbow; this phenomenon is colloquially known as bumping one's "funny bone". Other common examples occur when sustained pressure has been applied over a nerve, inhibiting or stimulating its function. Removing the pressure typically results in gradual relief of these paresthesias. Most pressure-induced paraesthesia results from awkward posture, such as engaging in cross-legged sitting for prolonged periods of time. Similar brief shocks can be experienced when any other nerve is injured (e.g., a pinched neck nerve may cause a brief shock-like paresthesia toward the scalp). Spinal column irregularities may injure the spinal cord briefly when the head or back is turned, flexed, or extended into brief uncommon positions (Lhermitte's sign).

The most common everyday cause is temporary restriction of nerve impulses to an area of nerves, commonly caused by leaning or resting on parts of the body such as the legs (often followed by a pins and needles tingling sensation). Reactive hyperaemia, which occurs when blood flow is restored after a period of ischemia, may be accompanied by paresthesia too, e.g., when patients with Raynaud's disease rewarm after a cold episode. Other causes include conditions such as hyperventilation syndrome and panic attacks, in which paresthesias of the mouth, hands, and feet are common, transient symptoms. A cold sore outside the mouth (not a canker sore inside the mouth) can be preceded by tingling due to activity of the causative herpes simplex virus. The varicella zoster virus, which causes shingles, also notably may cause recurring pain and tingling in skin or tissue along the distribution path of that nerve (most commonly in the skin, along a dermatome pattern, but sometimes feeling like a headache, chest or abdominal pain, or pelvic pain).

Paresthesias can also be a symptom of mercury poisoning. Seafood poisoning is also possible, e.g., ciguatera toxin is produced within dinoflagellate plankton, which when consumed by other sea animals and then by humans, can lead to perioral paresthesia and temperature-related dysesthesia.

Cases of paresthesia have also been reported at varying frequencies following anthrax, flu, HPV, and COVID-19 vaccine intake. Benzodiazepine withdrawal may also cause paresthesia, as the drug removal leaves the GABA receptors desensitized. Benzodiazepines (e.g., Xanax and Valium) can be prescribed to try to relax muscle spasms or suppress epileptic seizures.

=== Chronic ===
Chronic paresthesia (Berger's paresthesia, Sinagesia, or meralgia paresthetica) indicates either a problem with the functioning of neurons, or poor circulation. In the elderly, paresthesia is often the result of poor circulation in the limbs (such as in peripheral vascular disease), most often caused by atherosclerosis, the build-up of plaque within artery walls over decades, with eventual plaque ruptures, internal clots over the ruptures, and subsequent clot healing, but leaving behind narrowing or closure of the artery openings, locally and/or in downstream smaller branches. Without a proper supply of blood and nutrients, nerve cells can no longer adequately send signals to the brain. Because of this, paresthesia can also be a symptom of vitamin deficiency or other malnutrition, as well as metabolic disorders like diabetes, hypothyroidism, or hypoparathyroidism.

Irritation to the nerve can also come from inflammation to the tissue. Joint conditions such as rheumatoid arthritis, psoriatic arthritis, and carpal tunnel syndrome are common sources of paresthesia. Nerves below the head may be compressed where chronic neck and spine problems exist, and can be caused by, among other things, muscle cramps that may be a result of clinical anxiety or excessive mental stress, bone disease, poor posture, unsafe heavy lifting practices, or physical trauma such as whiplash.

Another cause of paresthesia may be direct damage to the nerves themselves, i.e., neuropathy, which itself can stem from injury, such as from frostbite; infections such as Lyme disease; or may be indicative of a current neurological disorder. Neuropathy is also a side effect of some chemotherapies, such as in the case of chemotherapy-induced peripheral neuropathy. Chronic paresthesia can sometimes be symptomatic of serious conditions, such as a transient ischemic attack; or autoimmune diseases such as multiple sclerosis, complex regional pain syndrome, or lupus erythematosus. The use of fluoroquinolones can also cause paresthesia. Brainstem stroke survivors and those with traumatic brain injury (TBI) may experience paresthesia from damage to the central nervous system.

=== Acroparesthesia ===
Acroparesthesia is severe pain in the extremities, and may be caused by Fabry disease, a type of sphingolipidosis. It can also be a sign of hypocalcemia.

=== Dentistry ===
Dental paresthesia is loss of sensation caused by maxillary or mandibular anesthetic administration before dental treatment.

Potential causes include trauma introduced to the nerve sheath during administration of the injection, hemorrhage about the sheath, more side-effect-prone types of anesthetic being used, or administration of anesthetic contaminated with alcohol or sterilizing solutions.

=== Drugs ===
- Anticonvulsant pharmaceutical drugs, such as topiramate, sultiame, or acetazolamide
- Antidepressant discontinuation syndrome
- Benzodiazepine withdrawal syndrome
- Beta alanine
- Dextromethorphan (recreational use)
- Intravenous administering of strong pharmaceutical drugs acting on the central nervous system (CNS), mainly opiates, opioids, or other narcotics, especially in non-medical use (drug abuse)
- Ketorolac
- Lidocaine poisoning
- Lomotil
- Nitrous oxide, long-term exposure
- Ritonavir

=== Other ===
Other causes may include:

- Autonomous sensory meridian response ("ASMR")
- Carpal tunnel syndrome
- Cerebral amyloid angiopathy
- Chiari malformation
- Coeliac disease
- Complex regional pain syndrome
- Cubital tunnel syndrome
- Decompression sickness
- Dehydration
- Erythromelalgia
- Fabry disease
- Fibromyalgia
- Fluoroquinolone toxicity
- Guillain–Barré syndrome (GBS)
- Heavy metals
- Herpes zoster
- Hydroxy alpha sanshool, a component of Sichuan peppers
- Hyperglycemia (high blood sugar)
- Hyperkalemia
- Hyperventilation
- Hypocalcemia, and in turn:
  - Hypermagnesemia, a condition in which hypocalcemia itself is typically observed as a secondary symptom
- Hypoglycemia (low blood sugar)
- Hypothyroidism
- Immunodeficiency, such as chronic inflammatory demyelinating polyneuropathy (CIDP)
- Lupus erythematosus
- Lyme disease
- Magnesium deficiency, often as a result of long-term proton-pump inhibitor use
- Menopause
- Mercury poisoning
- Migraines
- Multiple sclerosis
- Nerve compression syndrome
- Obdormition
- Oxygen toxicity, especially breathing oxygen under pressure, such as in scuba diving
- Pyrethrum or pyrethroid pesticides
- Post-polio syndrome
- Rabies
- Radiation poisoning
- Sarcoidosis
- Sciatica
- Scorpion stings
- Spinal disc herniation or injury
- Spinal stenosis
- Stinging nettles
- Syringomyelia
- Transverse myelitis
- Variant Creutzfeldt–Jakob disease (AKA "mad cow disease")
- Vitamin B_{5} deficiency
- Vitamin B_{6} excess
- Vitamin B_{12} deficiency

Additional causes are listed by the Cleveland Clinic.

== Diagnostics ==
A nerve conduction study usually provides useful information for making a diagnosis. An MRI or a CT scan is sometimes used to rule out certain causes stemming from central nervous system issues.

== Treatment ==
Medications offered can include the immunosuppressant prednisone, intravenous gamma globulin (IVIG), anticonvulsants such as gabapentin or tiagabine, or antiviral medication, depending on the underlying cause.

In addition to treatment of the underlying disorder, palliative care can include the use of topical numbing creams, such as lidocaine or prilocaine. Ketamine has also been successfully used, but is generally not approved by insurance. Careful consideration must be taken to apply only the necessary amount, as excess can contribute to these conditions. Otherwise, these products generally offer extremely effective, but short-lasting relief from these conditions.

Paresthesia caused by stroke may receive some temporary benefit from high doses of baclofen multiple times a day. HIV patients who self-medicate with cannabis report that it reduces their symptoms.

Paresthesia caused by shingles is treated with appropriate antiviral medication.

== Etymology ==
The word paresthesia (/ˌpærɪsˈθiːziə, -ʒə/; British English paraesthesia; plural paraesthesiae /-zii/ or paraesthesias) comes from the Greek para ("beside", i.e., 'abnormal') and aisthesia ("sensation").

== Bibliography ==
- G. Cicarelli; G. Della Rocca; M. Amboni; C. Ciacci; G. Mazzacca; A. Filla; P. Barone (December 2003). "Clinical and neurological abnormalities in adult celiac disease". Neurol Sci. 24 (5): 311–317. doi:10.1007/s10072-003-0181-4. PMID 14716525.
