= Ganbare Doukichan =

Japanese doujin manga

- First volume cover

がんばれ同期ちゃん
- Genre: Romantic comedy
- Manga
- Written by: Yom
- Published by: Self-published
- Original run: September 9, 2019 – May 15, 2023
- Volumes: 11
- Original net animation
- Directed by: Kazuomi Koga
- Written by: Yoshiko Nakamura
- Studio: Atelier Pontdarc
- Licensed by: Crunchyroll: SA/SEA: Muse Communication
- Released: September 20, 2021 – December 6, 2021
- Runtime: 6 minutes
- Episodes: 12
- Related media
- Miru Tights
- icon

Ganbare Doukichan (がんばれ同期ちゃん, Ganbare Dōki-chan; transl. "Do Your Best, Douki-chan") is a collection of illustrations by Japanese artist Yom. The doujinshi manga was serialized online via Yomu's Twitter account from September 2019 to May 2023. Eleven volumes were released from May 2020 to December 2023. A short-form 12-episode original net animation (ONA) adaptation by Atelier Pontdarc was released from September to December 2021.

== Premise ==
The story follows Douki-chan, an office lady who works with Douki-kun. Unbeknownst to Douki-kun, Douki-chan secretly has feelings for him. As Douki-chan struggles to confess her feelings, her colleagues, both the kouhai co-worker, and their senpai from a related company, also vie for Douki-kun's affection.

== Characters ==
Douki-chan (同期ちゃん, Dōki-chan) (Note: "同期" (dōki) means "contemporary" or "colleague". This is why Douki-chan and Douki-kun have the same "name"; they came to the company at the same time, whereas Senpai-san preceded and Kouhai-chan succeeded them.)
Voiced by: Nene Hieda
An office worker at a Tokyo-based company. She is a serious worker and promising prospect within the company. However, she is inexperienced when it comes to romance, and is unsure of how to approach the man she has feelings for.
Douki-kun (同期くん, Dōki-kun)
Voiced by: Junya Enoki
The male office coworker of Douki-chan and Kouhai-chan, who is drawn without visible eyes. He has a romantic interest towards Douki-chan and often goes to look after her when she gets isolated, but is too shy to confess his feelings to her.
Kouhai-chan (後輩ちゃん, Kōhai-chan) (Note: lit. "junior")
Voiced by: Sumire Uesaka
A coy woman with a soft vibe who is always smiling. She is a junior in the same department as Douki-chan and Douki-kun. She is always trying to seduce Douki-kun and isolate him from the other girls. She enjoys cosplay, picking popular characters and leaving Douki-chan with less attractive mascot costumes.^{Ch. 10.5, 36, 36.5} Many other men are attracted to her.^{Ch. 25.5}
Maiko Okuzumi (奥墨マイコ, Okuzumi Maiko) / Senpai-san (先輩さん) (Note: lit. "senior")
Voiced by: Asami Seto
Maiko is a woman with a mature female aura, and is the only character with an actual name and a visible name tag.^{Ch. 12} She is currently an employee of a business partner. She is free-spirited and likes to drink. As Douki-kun's senior in college, she was very close with him, but had turned down his confession, saying that she was already seeing someone.^{Ch. 62-63} Her younger sister is Yuiko Okuzumi from the author's related web manga Miru Tights.^{Ch. 54}
Shinchin-chan (新人ちゃん) (Note: lit. "intern")
A girl with short blonde hair who gives Douki-kun a kiss on the lips the first time they bump into each other. She becomes an intern in their department, and later a permanent hire. She easily deduces that Douki-chan has a crush on Douki-kun.^{Ch. 30-35} In one of the chapters, she tells Douki-kun that she joined the company because she likes him romantically too, but quickly adds "just kidding".^{Ch. 53}

== Media ==
=== Volumes ===
No.	Release date	ISBN
1	May 1, 2020	—
2	August 14, 2020	—
3	December 30, 2020	—
4	May 1, 2021	—
5	August 14, 2021	—
6	December 30, 2021	—
7	August 13, 2022	—
8	December 30, 2022	—
9	May 3, 2023	—
10	August 12, 2023	—
11	December 30, 2023	—

=== Original net animation ===
An original net animation (ONA) adaptation was announced on August 14, 2021. The series is produced by Atelier Pontdarc and directed and storyboarded by Kazuomi Koga, with Yoshiko Nakamura writing the series' scripts, Yuki Morikawa designing the characters, and Ryōsuke Naya serving as the sound director. The ending theme is "Lady Go", performed by Nene Hieda. It was released on the Abema service from September 20 to December 6, 2021. Crunchyroll licensed the series outside of Asia. Muse Communication licensed the series in South and Southeast Asia. A Blu-ray with a bonus episode was released on December 24, 2021.

==== Episodes ====
No.	Title (Note: All English titles, except for that of the bonus episode, are taken from Crunchyroll.)	Original release date
1	"Due To a Mix-up At the Hotel, Two Coworkers End Up Sharing a Room On a Business Trip"; Transliteration: "Shutchō Saki no Hoteru no Techigai de, Aibeya ni Natte Shimatta Kaisha no Dōki" (Japanese: 出張先のホテルの手違いで、相部屋になってしまった会社の同期)	September 20, 2021
On a work trip, Douki-chan arranges for her and her coworker Douki-kun to share a hotel room. She feigns embarrassment when they arrive and warns him not to try anything untoward, but is met with disappointment when he does not.
2	"My Coworker and I Were in the Elevator Together and Then We Were Trapped Inside Together"; Transliteration: "Erebētā ni Issho ni Nottara, Tojikomerarete Shimatta Kaisha no Dōki" (Japanese: エレベーターに一緒に乗ったら、閉じ込められてしまった会社の同期)	September 27, 2021
Douki-chan and Douki-kun are trapped in an elevator for over an hour, but Douki-kun behaves like a gentleman. When the two finally emerge, Kouhai-chan eagerly embraces Douki-kun, leaving Douki-chan incensed.
3	"The Junior Who Gives Chocolate On Valentine's Day At Work"; Transliteration: "Barentain Dē ni, Shokuba de Choko o Watasu Kaisha no Kōhai" (Japanese: バレンタインデーに、職場でチョコを渡す会社の後輩)	October 4, 2021
Douki-chan prepares a Valentine's Day present for Douki-kun, but Kouhai-kun beats her to it and gives him a gift first. Kouhai-chan then invites him out to dinner and Douki-chan follows them into a restaurant. Kouhai-chan then orders a large meal for Douki-chan and leaves with Douki-kun.
4	"My Coworker Who Came Back To Pick Up What He Left Behind"; Transliteration: "Wasuremono o Tori ni Modotta Kaisha no Dōki" (Japanese: 忘れ物を取りに戻った会社の同期)	October 11, 2021
Douki-kun returns to the restaurant late to pick up "something he left behind" and finds Douki-chan almost passed out from drinking too much sake. He carries her out and accompanies her to her local railway station, where she awkwardly hands him the Valentine's Day present she had prepared.
5	"A Coworker Who Was Looking Forward To a White Day Gift..."; Transliteration: "Howaito Dē ni Kitai Shiteita Kaisha no Dōki..." (Japanese: ホワイトデーに期待していた会社の同期…)	October 18, 2021
Douki-kun is out of the office all day, leaving Douki-chan and Kouhai-chan disheartened. When Douki-kun eventually leaves the office late, he encounters Douki-chan, but she gets caught in the elevator doors. He presents her with a thank-you gift, but Kouhai-chan suddenly grabs him by the arm and requests a present as well. To Douki-chan's annoyance, he has one for Kouhai-chan too.
6	"My Coworker Who Received An Embarrassing Selfie"; Transliteration: "Hazukashii Jidori Shashin o Okurarete Shimatta Kaisha no Dōki" (Japanese: 恥ずかしい自撮り写真を送られてしまった会社の同期)	October 25, 2021
Douki-chan contemplates sending a selfie of herself in a maid costume to Douki-kun, but her cat hits the send button. At work, she is hugely embarrassed, but does not have a chance to apologize for sending the photo. When she sees Kōhai-chan flirting with Douki-kun, she vows to change and express her feelings to him.
7	"A Coworker Who Goes All-Out With Seductive Lingerie"; Transliteration: "Shōbu Shitagi de Kyō ni Kakeru Kaisha no Dōki" (Japanese: 勝負下着で今日に懸ける会社の同期)	November 1, 2021
One day, Douki-chan wears seductive lingerie and invites Douki-kun for dinner after a work meeting, hoping to reveal her feelings for him. However, the meeting includes Senpai-san, who invites Douki-kun out for drinks, and although he initially declines, she insists that the three of them have drinks together.
8	"They Clash!! The Junior Coworker VS The Business Client Senpai"; Transliteration: "Gekitotsu!! Kaisha no Kōhai Bāsasu Torihikisaki no Senpai" (Japanese: 激突!!会社の後輩vs取引先の先輩)	November 8, 2021
While Douki-chan, Douki-kun and Senpai-san are out for drinks, Kouhai-chan sees them and invites herself along. Suddenly, Douki-kun grabs Douki-chan's arm and they hide in an alley; he asks her what she wanted to tell him. However, before Douki-chan sums up the courage to tell him how she feels, they are found by the other two women.
9	"A Coworker Who's Obliviously Asleep"; Transliteration: "Nani mo Shirazu ni Neteiru Kaisha no Dōki" (Japanese: 何も知らずに寝ている会社の同期)	November 15, 2021
Douki-chan suddenly awakes from a dream in which she sees Senpai-san take Douki-kun home after their night out drinking. She then notices someone next to her in bed, hoping that it may be Douki-kun, but finds that it is Kouhai-chan; apparently, the four were so intoxicated that Senpai-san dropped them home. She then receives a text message from Douki-kun, who apologizes for their evening being interrupted.
10	"A Coworker Who's Excited About a Poolside Date"; Transliteration: "Pūru Dēto to Ukareru Kaisha no Dōki" (Japanese: プールデートと浮かれる会社の同期)	November 22, 2021
Senpai-san offers free tickets to Douki-chan and Douki-kun for a hotel garden pool party, and Douki-chan looks forward to the dating opportunity. At the party, Douki-chan is surprised to also see Senpai-san and Kouhai-chan there, also in their bikinis. Douki-kun is too shy to compliment Douki-chan in her bikini, but he later sends her an appreciative text message.
11	"It Finally Bears Fruit!! Good For You, Douki-Chan"; Transliteration: "Tsui ni Minoru!! Yokatta ne, Dōki-chan" (Japanese: ついに実る!!よかったね、同期ちゃん)	November 29, 2021
Douki-kun accompanies Douki-chan to a wedding, and at the end of the ceremony, Douki-chan catches the bridal bouquet. She gives it to a young girl but keeps a petal for herself. Much later at the wedding reception, Kouhai-chan has too much to drink and asks Douki-kun to take her home, but she is inundated by offers from other men. As Douki-chan prepares to leave, she gets lost in the building and is accosted by drunk men from the wedding party. Meanwhile, Douki-kun is looking for Douki-chan and finds the petal she had dropped earlier.
12	"That's What I'm Talking About, Douki-Kun"; Transliteration: "Sō Iu Toko da zo, Dōki-kun" (Japanese: そういうとこだぞ、同期くん)	December 6, 2021
Douki-kun finds Douki-chan being accosted by drunk men and rescues her by claiming that she is his fiancée. However as he leads her away by the hand, he bumps into Kouhai-chan, who had too much to drink, and they fall down together. Later, Kouhai-chan pressures Douki-chan into wearing a maid outfit and performing together for the wedding guests, much to her embarrassment.
Bonus	"A Coworker Who's Suffering from Social Inequality"; Transliteration: "Kakusa Shakai ni Nayamu Kaisha no Dōki" (Japanese: 格差社会に悩む会社の同期)	December 24, 2021
Douki-chan, Kouhai-chan, and Senpai-san spend time together in the bath. At a restaurant, Senpai-san asks Douki-kun which of the three women's swimsuits he prefers, before she and Kouhai-chan leave with him, much to Douki-chan's dismay.

== See also ==
- It's a Little Late, but I've Fallen in Love with My Childhood Friend, a mixed-media project by the same illustrator
- Miru Tights, another series of illustrations by the same illustrator
- Tawawa on Monday, aired in tandem with Ganbare Doukichan in 2021 with a brief crossover promotion
