= Uncle from Another World =

Japanese manga series by Hotondoshindeiru

- First tankōbon volume cover

異世界おじさん (Isekai Ojisan)
- Genre: Fantasy comedy; Isekai
- Manga
- Written by: Hotondoshindeiru
- Published by: Kadokawa Shoten
- English publisher: NA: Yen Press
- Imprint: MF Comics
- Magazine: ComicWalker
- Original run: June 29, 2018 – present
- Volumes: 16
- Anime television series
- Directed by: Shigeki Kawai
- Written by: Kenta Ihara
- Music by: Kenichiro Suehiro
- Studio: Atelier Pontdarc
- Licensed by: Netflix (streaming rights)
- Original network: Tokyo MX, SUN, KBS Kyoto, TV Aichi, AT-X, BS11
- Original run: July 6, 2022 – March 8, 2023
- Episodes: 13
- icon

Uncle from Another World (Japanese: 異世界おじさん, Hepburn: Isekai Ojisan) is a Japanese web manga series written and illustrated by Hotondoshindeiru. It started serialization on Kadokawa Shoten's ComicWalker app and website in June 2018. As of October 2026, 16 volumes have been released. The manga is licensed in North America by Yen Press. An anime television series adaptation produced by Atelier Pontdarc aired from July 2022 to March 2023.

== Premise ==
In modern-day Japan, Takafumi Takaoka picks up his uncle who recently awakened from a 17-year coma after being hit by a truck. Uncle shows the ability to use magic spells, and explains that he was actually sent to another world. Takafumi lets his uncle move in with him, and he, joined by Takafumi's childhood friend Sumika Fujimiya, spends his days helping Uncle adjust to modern society while also watching his memories of the other world.

== Characters ==
Uncle (おじさん, Ojisan) / Yōsuke Shibazaki (嶋㟢 陽介, Shibazaki Yōsuke)
Voiced by: Takehito Koyasu / Akira Ishida (Chain Chronicle 3) (Japanese); Feodor Chin (English)
A 34-year-old man who woke up from coma after 17 years, but actually went to another world during that time. His unattractive appearance barely changed since the time he transferred to another world, and he was frequently mistaken for an orc and treated extremely poorly by the inhabitants of the other world, to the point where he had to continuously wipe his own memories to maintain his sanity. He retained his magic ability and uses it freely. He is oblivious of any romantic approach from the girls he encountered during his journey, but instantly realized Sumika's feelings towards Takafumi. Due to his long absence, he tends to be confused by modern-day technology and culture. A diehard Sega fan, he uses the strategy learned in classic games from consoles like the Sega Genesis and Sega Saturn to inform his tactics in the other world; the decline of Sega home consoles, which ended with the release of Sega Dreamcast, shocked him to his core.
Takafumi Takaoka (高丘 敬文, Takaoka Takafumi)
Voiced by: Jun Fukuyama (Japanese); Aleks Le (English)
Yōsuke's nephew who took him in after realizing he could make money off his uncle's magic ability, mainly through YouTube ad revenue. He is interested in Yōsuke's adventure in the other world, especially about the girls he encountered through his journey, but his uncle's aromantic personality sometimes turn him off. Ironically, he is also oblivious to Sumika's feelings for him. His parents divorced from the stress of dealing with his uncle's medical status, and he uses Yōsuke's stories as a form of escapism from being raised in a broken family.
Sumika Fujimiya (藤宮 澄夏, Fujimiya Sumika)
Voiced by: Mikako Komatsu (Japanese); Jenny Yokobori (English)
Takafumi's childhood friend with whom he reunited with after a long time. She has a crush on him, though he remains oblivious. After finding out about Yōsuke's magic ability the moment she came into Takafumi's apartment, she starts spending time at Takafumi's apartment and together, they spend their days watching replays of Yōsuke's adventures in the other world. While she has fond memories of their childhood, but is it revealed in Takafumi's memories that Sumika frequently bullied Takafumi for some time. Though he seems to hold no grudge in the present day, Sumika is horrified at this revelation and including the fact she believed she was kind, girly and pretty girl but in the truth was a mean tomboy who looked like an ugly boy and made man-like smug faces. Sumika has a younger brother named Chiaki, but the brother has the same face and expressions Sumika once had which she is still ashamed of.
Tsundere Elf (ツンデレエルフ, Tsundere Erufu) / Suzailgiererzegalnelvzegilreagranzelga Elga (スザイルギラーゼガルネルブゼギルレアグランゼルガ = エルガ, Suzairugirāzegarunerubuzegirureaguranzeruga Eruga)
Voiced by: Haruka Tomatsu / Ayane Sakura (Chain Chronicle 3) (Japanese); Victoria Grace (English)
An elf who Yōsuke rescued in the other world. She has a crush on him after he saved her from a dragon, but since the term 'tsundere' only became popular four years after Yōsuke went into coma, he does not understand her tendencies and thinks she is harassing him instead. Despite this, she is kind, often defending Yōsuke when other people attempt to slander him, though he interprets this as blackmail. It is later revealed that she is the princess of the elves.
Mabel Laybelle (メイベル = レイベール, Meiberu Reiberu)
Voiced by: Aoi Yūki / Asami Imai (Chain Chronicle 3) (Japanese); Yuzu Harada (English)
A blue-haired, reclusive woman who is the holder of the mythical Ice Sword capable of defeating the Flame Dragon. However, Yōsuke defeats the dragon without using the sword, causing Mabel to question her purpose. She becomes a NEET after Yōsuke encourages her to continue embracing her inner desires. It is later revealed that her ancestors, the Ice Clan, are descendants of a Japanese samurai who was transported to their world 400 years ago.
Alicia Edelsia (アリシア = イーデルシア, Arishia Īderushia)
Voiced by: Aki Toyosaki / Aya Uchida (Chain Chronicle 3) (Japanese); Emily Faucret (English)
A rookie priestess in a party with Edgar and Raiga. Yōsuke repeatedly runs into her party and assists them in completing difficult quests. She is worshipped as a crusader hero after her party accidentally took Yōsuke's credit for defeating a horde of goblins.

== Media ==
=== Manga ===
The series is written and illustrated by Hotondoshindeiru. It started serialization on Kadokawa Shoten's manga app and website ComicWalker on June 29, 2018. A character popularity poll was held to commemorate the release of the first volume, where the winning character would be featured in a bonus segment at the end of the volume. As of October 2026, 16 tankōbon volumes have been published.

In November 2020, Yen Press announced that they licensed the series for English publication.

==== Volume list ====
No.	Original release date	Original ISBN	English release date	English ISBN
1	November 21, 2018	978-4-04-065368-6	June 8, 2021	978-1-9753-2344-8
2	April 22, 2019	978-4-04-065707-3	August 3, 2021	978-1-9753-2394-3
3	October 21, 2019	978-4-04-064093-8	November 2, 2021	978-1-9753-2396-7
4	April 23, 2020	978-4-04-064575-9	March 29, 2022	978-1-9753-4059-9
5	October 23, 2020	978-4-04-065952-7	August 9, 2022	978-1-9753-4061-2
6	June 23, 2021	978-4-04-680402-0	February 21, 2023	978-1-9753-4182-4
7	February 21, 2022	978-4-04-681123-3	June 20, 2023	978-1-9753-6095-5
8	August 20, 2022	978-4-04-681684-9	October 17, 2023	978-1-9753-6999-6
9	March 22, 2023	978-4-04-682358-8	February 20, 2024	978-1-9753-8041-0
10	September 22, 2023	978-4-04-682881-1	September 17, 2024	978-1-9753-9370-0
11	March 23, 2024	978-4-04-683492-8	March 4, 2025	979-8-8554-1090-7
12	September 21, 2024	978-4-04-683997-8	November 4, 2025	979-8-8554-1837-8
13	March 22, 2025	978-4-04-684695-2	July 28, 2026	979-8-8554-2839-1
14	September 22, 2025	978-4-04-685214-4	April 27, 2027	979-8-8554-3933-5
15	April 23, 2026	978-4-04-660132-2	—	—
16	October 23, 2026	978-4-04-660713-3	—	—

=== Anime ===
An anime television series adaptation was announced on June 18, 2021. The series is produced by Atelier Pontdarc and directed by Shigeki Kawai, with Kenta Ihara writing the series' scripts, Kazuhiro Oota designing the characters, and Kenichiro Suehiro composing the music. The opening theme song is "Story" by Mayu Maeshima, while the ending theme song is "Ichibanboshi Sonority" by Yuka Iguchi. It aired from July 6, 2022, to March 8, 2023, on AT-X. The series was streamed worldwide by Netflix. On July 27, it was announced that episode 5 would be delayed for two weeks to August 17, due to the COVID-19 pandemic. On September 2, following the release of episode 7, an indefinite delay was put into effect, citing more COVID-19 related concerns. However, on August 27, Ippei Icchi stated that he was supposed to direct episode 10, but abruptly left following the discovery that the episode still did not have staff chosen, and that only in-house staff would participate. On September 9, it was announced that the series would restart its broadcast from episode 1 on October 6, with episode 8, the first new episode since going on hiatus, airing on November 24. On December 26, it was announced that episode 13 would be delayed and aired at a later date, which was later confirmed to be March 8, 2023.

==== Episode list ====
No.	Title (Note: English translated titles are taken from Netflix.)	Directed by	Written by	Storyboarded by	Original release date
1	"I'm Finally Back From the Fantasy World Of Granbahamal After 17 Long Years!"; Transliteration: "Isekai Guranbahamaru ni Jūnananen Ita ga Yōyaku Kaettekita, zo" (Japanese: 異世界グランバハマルに17年いたがようやく帰ってきた、ぞ)	Shigeki Kawai	Kenta Ihara	Shigeki Kawai	July 6, 2022
Takafumi is informed his uncle Yōsuke, a 34-year-old man who has spent 17 years in a coma, has finally awoken. Yosuke claims to have been in an alternate world called Granbahamal and surprisingly demonstrates he has magical abilities he gained in Granbahamal. Takafumi decides to take him in so they can make money exploiting his powers on Youtube. Yosuke struggles with modern technology, particularly the internet. While describing his life in Granbahamal, Yōsuke shows Takafumi his memories of a female elf named Elga whom he saved and yet for some reason treated him badly every day. Takafumi realizes Yosuke has never heard of a Tsundere before and probably never realized that Elga was in love with him. Yōsuke explains how he was once attacked and left for dead, which is when Elga saved him. As Elga proclaims he is in her debt, he gives her an extremely rare ring, which Takafumi realizes from the video of his memories Elga thought was him proposing, but Yōsuke then sells the ring to pay off his perceived debt and abandoned Elga in a random town, leading to her following him everywhere for 17 years. Takafumi finds he actually respects Elga for her determination and stubbornness in chasing Yōsuke for so long.
2	""Guardian Heroes" Shoulda Been Number One!"; Transliteration: "Ichii "Gādian Hīrōzu" Darō!" (Japanese: 1位「ガーディアンヒーローズ」だろぉおおお！)	Kuniyasu Nishina	Kenta Ihara	Shigeki Kawai	July 13, 2022
Yōsuke buys an issue of the last ever SEGA Saturn Magazine and is disappointed the most popular game was a Bishōjo game (called EVE Burst Error) and his favourite Guardian Heroes only made it to 197th place. He reveals he hates RPG games as he can never follow the story, revealing that once he was supposed to cure the broken heart of an Ice Witch named Mabel to get an ice sword to defeat a fire dragon, but he forgot, so he killed the dragon without the sword and left Mabel to her misery. On New Years Eve, Yōsuke shows his memories of Mabel coming to his room, impressed by his bravery and wanting to know how to stop being a coward. Completely unaware of what she actually wanted he told her cowardice is fine, convinced her to become a NEET, and even turned down her offer of the ice sword because he "doesn't like cold things". Takafumi bumps into Sumika Fujimiya, a girl he has not seen since childhood. Sumika sees Yōsuke chanting spells and believes he is crazy and taking advantage of Takafumi's generosity. Despite Yōsuke reading her mind, Takafumi proves he is almost as dense as Yōsuke as he believes he and Sumika are just friends. Sumika is so infuriated by their unusual living arrangement she decides to do something about it.
3	"I'm Your Un―...Aunt, Dear"; Transliteration: "Oji ga Iru nara Oba mo Iru Mono Desu, wa" (Japanese: 叔父がいるなら叔母もいるものです、わ)	Kazuomi Koga	Kenta Ihara	Gōichi Iwahata	July 20, 2022
Yōsuke must have 1000 subscribers to his Youtube channel or he will lose his right to earn money through advertisements. Takafumi discovers Yōsuke is losing subscribers because he is rude in the comments. Yōsuke recalls the time he visited the city of Luvaldram, protected by a giant barrier. Out of curiosity, Yōsuke destroyed the barrier, just to see if he was strong enough, and then quickly repaired it. Elga concealed that it was Yōsuke who destroyed the barrier to the cityfolk in exchange for a date, but Yōsuke ran away, believing she was blackmailing him. Sumika begins spending time at the flat. Yōsuke shows unusual insight into Sumika's feelings for Takafumi, so to help he transforms into a copy of Elga and claims to be Takafumi's aunt so he can give female advice, but he is exposed by Takafumi who insists they film a new Youtube video. Yōsuke uses magic to project Takafumi's memories of Sumika, showing he only remembers her as a vulgar tomboy and bully, much different to Sumika' memories who believed they had a sweet childhood friendship. The Elga video is watched 200,000 times in minutes, disgusting Yōsuke that his subscribers like elf girls more than his gaming videos, but Takafumi is ecstatic when they receive a huge amount of advertising money from Youtube.
4	"You Helped Me Through Tough Times"; Transliteration: "Tsurai Naka Omae ga Ite, Sasaete Kurete Yokatta" (Japanese: つらい中お前がいて、支えてくれてよかった)	Naomi Nakayama	Kenta Ihara	Naomi Nakayama	July 27, 2022
Rewatching more of Takafumi's childhood memories Sumika is depressed they all show her as the vulgar tomboy. While Takafumi is shopping, Yōsuke accidentally freezes Sumika with ice magic. Yōsuke politely leaves so Sumika can shower but Takafumi returns and accidentally sees her naked. Sumika hopes Takafumi is enticed, but he is so dense he decides to apologize by having Yōsuke erase his memory. Sumika furiously stops him and Takafumi believes she is just being a considerate friend. Sumika reveals today is her 20th birthday so Yōsuke shows them his 20th birthday memory, where he was alone at a festival but runs into Elga. Elga was surprised but happy when Yōsuke suddenly began walking her to his room. Takafumi and Sumika are disappointed to see Yōsuke was actually too drunk to walk and was just using Elga as a crutch to get back to his room, and he locked Elga outside and went to sleep. The morning after, Takafumi and Sumika notice that Elga's eyes are puffy and red from crying all night long, but Elga declares she will join Yōsuke in dungeon raiding. A memory from the next days inside the dungeon shows Elga was hit by a poisoned arrow and knocked Yōsuke unconscious, using a magic item to prevent him remembering anything. However, it is clear to Takafumi and Sumika that the poison was actually an aphrodisiac, and Elga actually used the magic item to prevent Yōsuke remembering her satiating her lust.
5	"That Reminds Me, I Almost Got Assassinated Once"; Transliteration: "Sōiya Ore, "Ansatsu" Sarekaketa Koto Aru na" (Japanese: そういや俺、「暗殺」されかけたことあるな)	Ippei Ichii	Kenta Ihara	Ippei Ichii	August 17, 2022
Yōsuke remembers almost being assassinated. His memory shows that Mabel tried to kill him; after he killed the fire dragon without her ice sword, she lost her life's purpose to guard the sword as no one needed it any more. The villagers told her to get a real job, so she left. Yōsuke told her to do what makes her happy, so she decided to become an adventurer, cure her own broken heart and unfreeze the ice sword. She passes out, and Yōsuke takes her back to his room, where he also gave her a ring, promising to take care of her. His proposal almost healed her heart and the ice sword began to melt, until Yōsuke explained she should sell the ring as it is worth enough money to take care of herself. Mabel, enraged, begins fighting Yōsuke, but is restrained by him, until Elga, who is in another room, hears the commotion and walks inside, deciding to help Mabel freeze Yōsuke. While he was frozen, Mabel explains to Elga that her Ice Clan was founded 400 years previously by a Japanese Samurai who was reincarnated. His wish asked for the power to kill God, the Ice Sword, and she believes Yōsuke to also be Japanese. Takafumi asks if Yōsuke received a wish and he is unsure. They rewind the memory to when Yōsuke was first transported and hear Granbahamal's god through a pre-recorded message in Mandarin Chinese. Takafumi uses a translation app and learns that, by mistake, Yōsuke had only wished to understand Granbahamal's language, effectively wasting his wish. Yōsuke uses this power to communicate with a group of adventurers who thought he was an orc, only for them to think he is simply an intelligent orc. Disillusioned with his story, Takafumi and Sumika stop watching and get coffee.
6	"So They Threw Me into the Basement of a Freak Show..."; Transliteration: "Kōshite Ore wa Misemonogoya no Chika ni Buchikomaretan da ga..." (Japanese: こうして俺は見世物小屋の地下にぶち込まれたんだが...)	Akira Toba	Kenta Ihara	Gōichi Iwahata	August 24, 2022
Still watching Yōsuke's first memory, they see that he was sold to a freak show by those adventurers. While in his cell, he saw a ray of moonlight that turned out to be the Spirit of Light. Takafumi realizes Yōsuke's language ability actually lets him communicate with spirits, giving him an extremely powerful form of magic. Escaping his cell, Yōsuke freed all the animals at the freak show, but they were feral, so he was forced to kill them. Immediately afterwards, he first met Elga and saved her from a dragon, but he stripped her thinking she was injured, overwhelming her. As a result, she began following him everywhere. Fast forwarding the memory to when Mabel froze him in ice, Yōsuke unfroze overnight and found himself in bed with Mabel and Elga. Mabel decides to keep Yōsuke's ring, making Elga jealous since the ring Yosuke once gave to her was already sold. Yōsuke decides he wants to help the hero clear out a dungeon, which makes Elga suspicious as the current hero is a woman nicknamed Shining Crusader. The three separated, Yōsuke to find the Shining Crusader, Elga to buy back her ring, and Mabel to sleep like an unemployed bum. Takafumi and Sumika are once again disappointed by Yōsuke's depressing memories but cheer up when he treats them to ramen.
7	"As You Can See, SEGA Games Are Very Helpful in Life!"; Transliteration: "Mite no Tōri Sega no Gēmu wa Jinsei no Yakunitatsunda!" (Japanese: 見てのとおりSEGAのゲームは人生の役に立つんだ！)	Shintarō Itoga	Kenta Ihara	Naomi Nakayama	August 31, 2022
Yosuke shows another memory of trying to retrieve a hoodie Elga had taken from him, but she knocked him unconscious, accidentally leaving her dress behind which Yosuke gives to Sumika. Yosuke experiences nostalgia about Elga. Yosuke names his language ability Wild Talker. Sumika leaves for college. Yosuke claims games helped him survive in Granbahamal and shows a memory of when he saved a village with heroes, Edgar, Alicia and Raiga, using moves from console games to defeat an orc army. He and the adventurers became friends, but when Alicia revealed she knew he was the one who rebuilt the magic barrier in Luvaldram, he erased their memories of him. He shows Takafumi that he met them again with their memories of him gone. They were on quest to slay a giant beast. Description of beast reminded Yōsuke of Sonic, so he tried to negotiate with it but upon finding its vicious nature he killed it instantly. Pointing at event, Yōsuke theorizes that Wild Talker activates when he has strong desire to talk to target. Takafumi realizes Sumika left her phone, so they fly it to her but see her with a dangerous looking man. Yosuke loans Takafumi some magic just in case. Takafumi realizes the man is Chiaki, a younger childhood friend of his and Sumika's younger brother. Sumika is embarrassed when she realizes Takafumi was prepared to defend her against a possibly dangerous delinquent like he did when they were children. Curious, Takafumi uses magic to see Sumika's memory of that event and sees Sumika was actually bullying other children and Takafumi only defended her because he got confused. Sumika's high school friend, Sawae, sees them together and is curious. Returning to Takafumi's apartment Yosuke continues his story and reveals Alicia was actually the Shining Crusader Hero.
8	"I Got Through it by Transforming into the Most Powerful Being I Know"; Transliteration: "Ore no Shiru Saikyō no Seibutsu ni Henshin Shite Kirinuketanda" (Japanese: 俺の知る最強の生物に変身して切り抜けたんだ)	Kazuomi Koga	Kenta Ihara	Masaharu Watanabe	November 24, 2022
Yōsuke projected the memories of Alicia on screen and found that she was given title of hero for defeating army of goblins which was actually Yōsuke's doing. Alicia still remembered about magic barrier incident but promised to keep it secret which made Yōsuke loosen his guard. They went to Labyrinth of Deep Darkness together which Alicia and others had been wanting to enter and acquire legendary Wand of Salvation ever since they were kids. Using his magic, Yōsuke quickly found shortcut to centre of labyrinth and got to the magic wand. But it felt like using cheat code in game, so Yōsuke erased everyone's memory and started again. He still thought getting himself involved was unfair, but he changed his mind then leaves alone to the capital. Takafumi, Yōsuke and Sumika talk about fans, ACs and types of punishments in schools which depresses Takafumi, so Yōsuke continues the story. Yōsuke thought making Alicia a hero brought danger to her, so he read memories of a soldier to find about the officials then teleported to meet them. He found out the commander used Alicia and others as disposable pawns to get more funding for the military. Yōsuke tried to talk about human values but failed, so he used magic to transform into his middle school teacher who was undefeated in debating. When Mabel entered the room, she and Yōsuke cast a magic to create illusion of them fighting. Yōsuke found Mabel joined the knights and in-turn became egoistic. When she lost focus, soldiers found about the illusion and confronted her. High Priest cast mind control magic on Mabel to attack Yōsuke but he undid it. Yōsuke urged the commander to believe in his soldier and stop increasing military unethically. He also promised to help when needed and transformed into a Blaze Dragon to show his power. Soon after, Mabel lost her job. In Japan, Takafumi realizes spirits are giving him hard time for making high demands during his visit to Sumika's college.
9	"The Ice Spirit Demands a Price For Its Cooler Magic"; Transliteration: "Kōri no Seirei ga Kūrā Mahō no Taika o Yōkyū Shiterun da yo" (Japanese: 氷の精霊がクーラー魔法の対価を要求してるんだよ)	Yoshitaka Nagaoka	Kenta Ihara	Gōichi Iwahata	December 1, 2022
10	"Civility Only Comes After You're Seen as a Person"; Transliteration: "Reisetsu wa...Hito de Aru to Mitomerarete kara da" (Japanese: 礼節は...人であると認められてからだ)	Shigeki Kawai	Kenta Ihara	Ippei Ichii	December 8, 2022
11	"N-no, I Wasn't Looking at Anything Dirty..."; Transliteration: "Chi, Chigau zo, Kore wa Etchi nano o Mita kara ja Naku..." (Japanese: ち、違うぞ、これはエッチなのを見たからじゃなく...)	Naomi Nakayama	Kenta Ihara	Naomi Nakayama	December 15, 2022
12	"Names Are Important, That's What (He/She) Said"; Transliteration: "Namae wa Daiji da, Aitsu mo Sō Itteita" (Japanese: 名前は大事だ、あいつもそう言っていた)	Shintarō Itoga	Kenta Ihara	Masaharu Watanabe	December 22, 2022
13	"It's Thanks to All of You"; Transliteration: "Minna no Okage da, Arigatō" (Japanese: みんなのおかげだ、ありがとう)	Ryūta Imaizumi	Kenta Ihara	Shigeki Kawai	March 8, 2023

== Reception ==
=== Manga ===
By June 2022, the manga had 1.8 million copies in circulation; by November 2022, it had over 3.3 million copies in circulation.

The series ranked eighth in the 2019 Next Manga Awards in the digital category. The series ranked fifteenth in 2020 a survey of workers of the Honya Club bookstore in Japan. In the 2020 edition of the Kono Manga ga Sugoi! guidebook, the series ranked eleventh. Also in 2020, it was a runner-up for BookWalker's grand prize.

Christopher Farris of Anime News Network reviewed the manga's first volume in 2021, critiquing that despite "a few good high-concept observations" and some subversive deadpan humor, he felt it didn't have anything else to say beyond that and was critical of Hotondoshindeiru's art style being made up of "rough and minimally expressive" character models and amateurishly rendered backgrounds, saying "Like so many other aside Isekai projects, Uncle From Another World has the makings of an entertaining concept, but thus far hasn't fully delivered as a complete story."

=== Anime ===
Fellow ANN editor Richard Eisenbeis placed Uncle from Another World at number four on his top 5 best anime list of 2022, praising its "non-stop riot of fish-out-of-water humor" and "stellar supporting cast". Allen Moody, writing for THEM Anime Reviews, said: "The show's uneven and chaotic, but so's its protagonist, so I guess it fits. Not all the moments are gems, and it starts a little slowly (until Uncle's "memories" kick in), but its curmudgeonly protagonist makes this at least an interesting variant on what is otherwise a tiresomely cliched genre."
