= Love After World Domination =

Japanese manga series and its adaptation(s)

- First tankōbon volume cover, featuring Desumi Magahara

恋は世界征服の後で (Koi wa Sekai Seifuku no Ato de)
- Genre: Romantic comedy, superhero
- Manga
- Written by: Hiroshi Noda
- Illustrated by: Takahiro Wakamatsu
- Published by: Kodansha
- English publisher: NA: Kodansha USA (digital)
- Magazine: Monthly Shōnen Magazine
- Original run: October 4, 2019 – November 5, 2022
- Volumes: 6
- Anime television series
- Directed by: Kazuya Iwata
- Produced by: Norio Fujui; Aya Iizuka; Kenta Maeda; Yuuko Matsui; Kei Nishi; Teppei Nojima; Fumihiro Ozawa; Shuuta Sasaki; Atsushi Shimokajiya; Hayato Suzuki; Yuuki Uchiyama; Kouhei Yamada
- Written by: Satoru Sugizawa
- Music by: Satoshi Hōno; Ryūnosuke Kasai
- Studio: Project No.9
- Licensed by: Crunchyroll (Note: In North America through Crunchyroll, LLC.); SA/SEA: Medialink
- Original network: AT-X, Tokyo MX, BS Asahi, TV Aichi
- Original run: April 8, 2022 – June 24, 2022
- Episodes: 12
- icon

Love After World Domination (Japanese: 恋は世界征服のあとで, Hepburn: Koi wa Sekai Seifuku no Ato de) is a Japanese manga series written by Hiroshi Noda and illustrated by Takahiro Wakamatsu. It was serialized in Kodansha's shōnen manga magazine Monthly Shōnen Magazine from October 2019 to November 2022, and has been collected in six tankōbon volumes. An anime television series adaptation produced by Project No.9 aired from April to June 2022.

== Plot ==
In order to combat the villainous Secret Society Gekko (秘密結社ゲッコー, Himitsu Kessha Gekkō), who have burnt half of the world and are planning to burn the rest, the Super Sentai group Freezing Sentai Gelato 5 (氷結戦隊ジェラート5, Hyōketsu Sentai Jerāto Faibu) is formed, consisting of Fudo Aikawa (Red Gelato), Hayato Ojino (Blue Gelato), Misaki Jinguji (Yellow Gelato), Daigo Todoroki (Green Gelato), Haru Arisugawa (Pink Gelato), and their leader Professor Big Gelato. However, things change when Gekko recruits a new member, the Reaper Princess Desumi Magahara. Not only is Desumi a formidable fighter, but she and Fudo also happen to fall in love with each other despite being mortal enemies. Even though neither of them have any experience in romance, they begin dating in secret, trying to hide their relationship from their respective organizations.

== Characters ==
=== Main characters ===
Desumi Magahara (禍原デス美, Magahara Desumi) / Reaper Princess (死神王女, Shinigami Ōjo)
Voiced by: Ikumi Hasegawa (Japanese); Lindsay Seidel (English)
Desumi is a Secret Society Gekko soldier who is known as the Reaper Princess due to her superhuman strength and perceived sadism. While resistant to dating Fudo at first, her desire to be loved and to be in love, combined with Fudo's earnest nature, convinced her to date him.
Fudo Aikawa (相川不動, Aikawa Fudō) / Red Gelato (レッドジェラート, Reddo Jerāto)
Voiced by: Yūsuke Kobayashi (Japanese); Anthony DiMascio (English)
Fudo, also known as Red Gelato, is the leader of the Freezing Sentai Gelato 5 and a workout enthusiast. He fell in love with Desumi at first sight, and successfully began dating her.

=== Freezing Sentai Gelato 5 ===
Hayato Ojino (王子野隼人, Ōjino Hayato) / Blue Gelato (ブルージェラート, Burū Jerāto)
Voiced by: Kazuyuki Okitsu (Japanese); Nazeeh Tarsha (English)
Hayato, also known as Blue Gelato, is a playboy who is popular among girls. He has a crush on Kiki Majima, not knowing of her involvement with Gekko as the Beast Princess.
Misaki Jinguji (神宮寺美咲, Jingūji Misaki) / Yellow Gelato (イエロージェラート, Ierō Jerāto)
Voiced by: Nene Hieda (Japanese); Morgan Lauré (English)
Misaki, also known as Yellow Gelato, is a member who acts as the big sister of the group.
Haru Arisugawa (有栖川ハル, Arisugawa Haru) / Pink Gelato (ピンクジェラート, Pinku Jerāto)
Voiced by: Rina Hidaka (Japanese); Macy Anne Johnson (English)
Haru, also known as Pink Gelato, is the newest member of the group. She idolized Desumi after she saved her from bullies during middle school, even though she did not know her name or who she was at the time, using it as one of the reasons she joined the Freezing Sentai Gelato 5. She has a long-standing crush on Fudo, to which he does not reciprocate.
Daigo Todoroki (轟大吾, Todoroki Daigo) / Green Gelato (グリーンジェラート, Gurīn Jerāto)
Voiced by: Junji Majima (Japanese); Jason Lord, Lee George (young) (English)
Daigo, also known as Green Gelato, is a man who acted as Desumi's martial arts mentor in the past once their dojo closed down. However, due to how strong she was, he has PTSD.
Professor Big Gelato (ビッグジェラート博士, Biggu Jerāto Hakase)
Voiced by: Chafurin (Japanese); Charlie Campbell (SimulDub), Phil Parsons (home video) (English)
The mentor and handler of the Freezing Sentai Gelato 5 who supplies the group with their weapons and technology.

=== Secret Society Gekko ===
Supreme Leader Bosslar (ボスラー大総統, Bosurā Dai Sōtō)
Voiced by: Tomokazu Sugita (Japanese); Reagan Murdock (English)
The supreme leader of Gekko, he leads his organization with a goal of bringing destruction towards society.
Kiki Majima (魔島忌々, Majima Kiki) / Beast Princess (魔獣王女, Majū Ōjo)
Voiced by: Kana Hanazawa (Japanese); Brittney Karbowski (English)
The brash and loud, animal-themed princess, she has a rivalry with Desumi and a contentious relationship with Blue Gelato.
Kyoko Kuroyuri (黒百合凶子, Kuroyuri Kyōko) / Steel Princess (鋼鉄王女, Kōtetsu Ōjo)
Voiced by: Hisako Kanemoto (Japanese); Hope Endrenyi (English)
A quiet and shy, armor-themed princess and subordinate to Catapult Snake; she is a close friend of Desumi's and later begins a relationship with Culverin Bear.
Anna Hojo (宝条闇奈, Hōjō Anna) / Heat Princess (灼熱王女, Shakunetsu Ōjo)
Voiced by: Ayane Sakura (Japanese); Tia Ballard (English)
A flame-themed princess and subordinate to Matchlock Eagle who keeps her identity a secret from everyone within Gekko. She is secretly in love with Desumi.
Culverin Bear (カルバリンベア, Karubarin Bea)
Voiced by: Hiroki Yasumoto (Japanese); Cris George (English)
A large bear-like monster who works for Gekko and serves as Desumi's superior, he usually has some sort of new weaponry that malfunctions and ruins his missions. He later begins a relationship with Steel Princess.
Catapult Snake (カタパルトスネーク, Kataparuto Sunēku)
Voiced by: Sayaka Kaneko (Japanese); Ciarán Strange (English)
A large snake-like monster who works for Gekko and is the superior to Steel Princess.
Matchlock Eagle (マッチロックイーグル, Matchirokku Īguru)
Voiced by: Hikaru Midorikawa (Japanese); Ray Hurd (English)
A large eagle-like monster who works for Gekko and is the superior to Heat Princess.
Drone Rabbit (ドローンラビット, Dorōn Rabitto)
Voiced by: Kana Ichinose (Japanese); Corey Pettit (English)
A large rabbit monster who works for Gekko and is the superior to Judgment Princess.
Kira Sanzugawa (三途川鬼羅, Sanzugawa Kira) / Blood Princess (鮮血王女, Senketsu Ōjo)
Voiced by: Miyuki Sawashiro (Japanese); Sarah Roach (English)
The only princess who is not a high school student as she works as a school nurse at Desumi's school. She is in love with Bosslar and has a tendency of treating and brainwashing her patients into acting as babies due to her very strong maternal instincts.
Ran Ran (乱乱) / Judgement Princess (断罪王女, Danzai Ōjo)
Voiced by: Nashiko Momotsuki (Japanese); Reshel Mae (English)
The only foreign princess who dresses in Korean martial arts attire and subordinate to Drone Rabbit. She starts off distant and hard to read, never having socialized with anyone outside of missions, but slowly opens up when Desumi convinces her to spend more time with her fellow princesses.
Ultimate Phantom (アルティメット・ファントム, Arutimetto Fantomu)
Voiced by: Yukari Tamura (Japanese); Bryn Apprill (English)
The result of Gekko's long-desired goal to create the ultimate monster.

=== Other characters ===
Hellko (ヘル子, Heruko)
Voiced by: M.A.O (Japanese); Monét Lerner (English)
Hellko is Desumi's beloved cat who is only seen at her dorm room at the Gekko premises. Though often coming off as bored and uninterested, she deeply cares for Desumi and swears payback on those who might end up hurting her.
Desuo Magahara (真ヶ原ですお, Magahara Desuo)
Voiced by: Kenji Hamada (Japanese); Charlie Campbell (English)
He is Desumi's father.
Kirumi Magahara (真ヶ原キルミ, Magahara Kirumi)
Voiced by: Yuka Iwahashi (Japanese); Mallorie Rodak (English)
She is Desumi's mother.
Urami Magahara (禍原ウラ美, Magahara Urami)
Voiced by: Chinami Hashimoto (Japanese); Sarah Wiedenheft (English)
She is Desumi's younger sister who idolizes her greatly.
Tsurami Magahara (禍原 ツラ美, Magahara Tsurami)
Voiced by: Sayaka Kaneko (Japanese); Sara Ragsdale (English)
She is Desumi's youngest sister.
Fudo's Mother (不動の母, Fudō no Haha)
Voiced by: Marie Miyake (Japanese); Randy Pearlman (English)
She is Fudo's mother.
Anna Hashimoto (橋本 杏奈, Hashimoto Anna)
Voiced by: Sumire Uesaka (Japanese); Laura Faverty (English)
Anna is an actress hired to appear in a wedding commercial with Fudo, who is her favorite member of Gelato 5.
Narrator (ナレーション, Narēshon)
Voiced by: Fumihiko Tachiki (Japanese); Monty Thompson (English)

== Production ==
The character design of Desumi is referenced to Gwen in Spider-Man: Into the Spider-Verse and Nai in Mahō Sentai Magiranger.

== Media ==
=== Manga ===
Love After World Domination, written by Hiroshi Noda and illustrated by Takahiro Wakamatsu, was serialized in Monthly Shōnen Magazine from October 4, 2019, to November 5, 2022. Kodansha collected its chapters into six tankōbon volumes, which were released from April 10, 2020, to December 15, 2022. The manga is licensed in English by Kodansha USA in digital form.

==== Volumes ====
No.	Original release date	Original ISBN	English release date	English ISBN
1	April 10, 2020	978-4-06-518676-3	October 5, 2021	978-1-63699-395-9
1. "I Love You!" (君のことが好きだ！, Kimi no koto ga suki da!); 2. "Do You Have a Girlfriend?!" (彼女はいますか!?, Kanojo wa imasu ka!?); 3. "The Truth About Dates" (デートの真理, Dēto no shinri); 4. "An Infiltration Mission, Eh?" (潜入ミッションか..., Sen'nyū misshon ka...); 5. "Are You Just Naming Potential Date Locations?!" (お前デートスポットみたいなとこばかり言うのな！, Omae dētosupotto mitaina toko bakari iu no na!); 6. "Love Made Me Weak!" (恋が私を弱くした！, Koi ga watashi o yowaku shita!); Bonus: "Desumi and Hellko" (デス美とヘル子, Desumi to Heruko)
2	November 17, 2020	978-4-06-521424-4	November 2, 2021	978-1-63699-454-3
7. "Would You Tell Me What That Is?" (その理由を聞かせてくれないか?, Sono riyū o kika sete kurenai ka?); 8. "Tell Me More" (詳しく聞かせてもらおうか！, Kuwashiku kika sete moraou ka!); 9. "My first 'Say, Ahhh!' with Desumi-san!!" (オレとデス美さんの初「あーん」が!!, Ore to Desumi-san no hatsu 'ān' ga!!); 10. "Welcome to Our World" (怪人（こっち）の世界にようこそ, Kaijin (kotchi) no sekai ni yōkoso); 11. "What's the Problem? We're at the Beach!" (いいじゃん せっかくのビーチなんだし, Ījan sekkaku no bīchi nan dashi); 12. "Desumi Magahara Is a Monster of My Own Making" (禍原デス美はオレが生み出したモンスターなんだ, Magahara Desumi wa ore ga umidashita monsutā nanda); 13. "I Came Here Today to Scout You for Gelato 5" (お前をジェラート5にスカウトしに来た, Omae o Jerāto 5 ni sukauto shi ni kita); Bonus: "Desumi and Ma" (デス美とおかん, Desumi to Okan)
3	April 8, 2021	978-4-06-522850-0	December 7, 2021	978-1-63699-507-6
14. "Everyone Has a Secret or Two" (誰にだって秘密のひとつやふたつあるさ, Dare ni datte himitsu no hitotsu ya futatsu arusa); 15. "Would You Help Me Study?" (勉強を見てくれませんか？, Benkyō o mite kuremasen ka?); 16. "If I May, Sir?" (お言葉ですがお父さん, O kotobadesuga otōsan); 17. "My Cool Sister Changed" (かっこよかったお姉ちゃんは変わってしまった, Kakkoyokatta onee-chan wa kawatte shimatta); 18. "Is There Any Point in Building Camaraderie?" (仲良くなって何か意味ある？, Nakayoku natte nanika imi aru?); 19. "Over the Moon of Kokutei (Part One)" (黒帝の月の上で〈前編〉, Kokutei no tsuki no ue de 〈zenpen〉); Bonus: "Desumi and Origin Stories" (デス美と誕生秘話, Desumi to tanjō hiwa)
4	January 17, 2022	978-4-06-526224-5	June 7, 2022	978-1-68491-206-3
20. "Over the Moon of Kokutei (Part Two)" (黒帝の月の上で〈後編〉, Kokutei no tsuki no ue de 〈kōhen〉); 21. "Of Course I'll Be There! Even if It Kills Me!" (行くさ！この身朽ち果てようとも！, Iku sa! Kono mi kuchihateyoutomo!); 22. "Awaken, Ultimate Phantom" (目覚めよ究極怪人, Mezameyo kyūkyoku kaijin); 23. "Great Combiner Sword: Gelato Claymore" (合体大剣ジェラートクレイモア, Gattai daiken Jerāto kureimoa); 24. "Let's Party!" (レッツ パーティー タイム！, Rettsu pātī taimu!); 25. "I'll Have to Face This Trauma" (このトラウマと向き合うしかない, Kono torauma to mukiau shika nai)
5	April 15, 2022	978-4-06-527157-5	November 1, 2022	978-1-68491-532-3
26. "Everything That Surrounds You" (君を取り巻く全てのもの, Kimi o torimaku subete no mono); 27. "Go On, Fudo. Kiss 'Er." (ほら不動キスしちゃいなよ, Hora Fudō kisu shi chai na yo); 28. "You Got One, Don't Ya? A Boyfriend. (1)" (いるんだな？恋人が ①, Irunda na? Koibito ga ①); 29. "You Got One, Don't Ya? A Boyfriend. (2)" (いるんだな？恋人が ②, Irunda na? Koibito ga ②); 30. "The Saint of Kichijoji" (吉祥寺の聖母, Kichijōji no seibo); 31. "I Have Always Been Your Prisoner" (とっくにあんたの虜になってんの, Tokkuni anta no toriko ni natten no); Bonus: "Urami and Fudo" (ウラ美と不動, Urami to Fudō)
6	December 15, 2022	978-4-06-530052-7	April 25, 2023	978-1-68491-902-4
32. "Bloodbath Incoming...!" (修羅場、確定だ...!, Shuraba, kakuteida...!); 33. "Why Is Hyoka-Kun Part of Gelato 5?!" (なぜ氷華くんがジェラート5に!?, Naze Hyōka-kun ga Jerāto 5 ni!?); 34. "I'm Thinking of Quitting Gelato 5" (ジェラート5を辞めようと思ってるんだ, Jerāto 5 o yameyou to omotte runda); 35. "We're Visitors from Overseas" (海外から来客なのよ, Kaigai kara raikyakuna no yo); 36. "Thank You, Fudo, and Farewell" (ありがとう不動さよならだ, Arigatō Fudō sayonara); 37. "Love After World Domination" (恋は世界征服のあとで, Koi wa sekai seifuku no ato de)

=== Anime ===
An anime television series adaptation was announced in the May 2021 issue of Monthly Shōnen Magazine on April 6, 2021. The series was produced by Project No.9 and directed by Kazuya Iwata, with Satoru Sugizawa overseeing the scripts, Akemi Kobayashi designing the characters, Satoshi Motoyama serving as the sound director, and Satoshi Hōno and Ryūnosuke Kasai composing the music. It aired from April 8 to June 24, 2022, on AT-X, Tokyo MX, BS Asahi, and TV Aichi. Masayoshi Ōishi and Yukari Tamura performed the opening theme song "Koi wa Explosion" (恋はエクスプロージョン; "Love Is an Explosion") from Episodes 1–5 and 7–11, (Note: In Episode 12, "Koi wa Explosion" is used as an insert song.) while Ōishi and Hiroki Yasumoto performed the theme for Episode 6, with the latter doing so as his character Culverin Bear. The ending theme song is "Koi wa Sekai Teiri to Tomo ni" (恋は世界定理と共に; "Love With the World Theorem") by Dialogue+.

Funimation originally licensed the series outside of Japan and planned to have it available on its streaming service, but it was transferred over to Crunchyroll following Sony's acquisition of the latter. On April 11, 2022, Crunchyroll announced that the series would receive an English dub, which premiered on April 22.

==== Episodes ====
No.	Title (Note: All English titles are taken from Crunchyroll.)	Directed by	Written by	Storyboarded by	Original release date
1	"I Love You!"; Transliteration: "Kimi no Koto ga Suki da!" (Japanese: 君のことが好きだ！)	Kazuo Nogami	Satoru Sugizawa	Kazuya Iwata	April 8, 2022
Freezing Sentai Gelato 5 team leader Fudo Aikawa, also known as Red Gelato, enjoys a date with his girlfriend, supervillain Desumi Magahara, while his teammates fight her minions. However, when Blue Gelato finds them, Fudo and Desumi immediately engage in combat. When Blue leaves, they return to their romance. Fudo reminisces about how this happened. A week earlier, the Gelato 5, consisting of Fudo, Haru Arisugawa (Pink), Hayato Ojino (Blue), Misaki Jinguji (Yellow), and Daigo Todoroki (Green), learned of a new villainess known as the Reaper Princess, a member of the villainous organization Secret Society Gekko. They later defeated Gekko member Culverin Bear and his army. During that fight, Fudo faced Desumi by himself, where he was smitten by her. Back at headquarters, Fudo revealed to Professor Big Gelato that he fell in love, with the latter encouraging him to express his feelings right away. Fudo took his advice literally when he summoned Desumi to an abandoned warehouse. Assuming this was a trick, Desumi attacked him, but was won over when she realized how serious Fudo was. Back in the present, they swear to keep their secret safe, as they are forced to fight again when Yellow arrives.
2	"The Truth About Dating"; Transliteration: "Dēto no Shinri" (Japanese: デートの真理)	Yūki Kinoshita, Megumi Soga	Satoru Sugizawa	Yūki Kinoshita	April 15, 2022
Gekko members, including Desumi, fight with the Gelato 5 in a shipyard. Desumi and Fudo break away from the fight to take a picture together. However, when Yellow arrives, Desumi feigns defeat. While she is on the ground, she overhears Fudo being interviewed by a news team about his romantic life. Once Yellow and the news team leave, Desumi asks Fudo to take her on a proper date. While a nervous Fudo is doing research on date activities, a drunk Jinguji arrives and tells him to do things they can both enjoy. The next day, he takes Desumi to a gym. After Desumi excuses herself, Jinguji calls Fudo, telling him to disregard her drunken advice. Distraught, he believes that he has disappointed Desumi, and goes to look for her. Once they reunite, Desumi assures him that she is happy just being with him. Delighted, they nearly kiss before they are called back into action. Sometime later, Hellko, Desumi's cat, reflects on how lonely Desumi was prior to her relationship with Fudo. While she accepts Fudo's role in Desumi's newfound happiness, Hellko swears to make Fudo pay if he does something to harm Desumi.
3	"At Last, the Amusement Park"; Transliteration: "Akogare no Yūenchi" (Japanese: あこがれの遊園地)	Kōhei Hatano	Satoru Sugizawa	Noriaki Saitō	April 22, 2022
Following weeks of inactivity from Gekko, Fudo severely misses Desumi. As such, he immediately takes on a suicide mission to infiltrate Gekko's base, leaving Big Gelato and Jinguji concerned for him. Desumi, similarly lonely, finds him in a vent in Gekko's base, and happily plays card games with him. However, they are nearly discovered by Culverin Bear, having to hide in a small locker. Fudo accidentally discomforts Desumi, who punches him out of the locker in embarrassment. He slams into Culverin Bear, activating his new weapons, which explode violently and destroy the base, leading Jingūji and Big Gelato to think Fudō accomplished his mission. The next day, Gekko Supreme Leader Bosslar meets with Desumi and the other villains, revealing their plan of stealing peoples' negative emotions and turning them into monsters is coming to fruition. Desumi proposes an amusement park as a desirable place to attack, and meets with Fudō there. A fight breaks out, and while the Gelato 5 deal with the Gekko army, Fudō and Desumi enjoy some time together on the rides. As the Gelato 5 leave, Arisugawa discovers a picture taken of a roller coaster, in which Fudo appears beside a girl.
4	"Could You Please Tell Me Why?"; Transliteration: "Sono Riyū o Kikasete Kurenai ka?" (Japanese: その理由を聞かせてくれないか？)	Hiroaki Takagi	Satoru Sugizawa	Hiroaki Takagi	April 29, 2022
Outside their activities, Desumi and Fudo are normal students. Desumi sees Fudo and Arisugawa in a café, and runs away upset. Arisugawa wanted to talk about the picture, but is convinced that Fudo is not dating anyone. They are then called into action, where Desumi roughly fights with Fudo. Taking him aside, she admits that while she knows that he was not cheating on her, she still felt jealous. As such, Fudo reassures her. They are surprised by Arisugawa, who reveals she overheard the whole conversation. The next day, Arisugawa informs the Gelato 5 of her and Fudo's upcoming school exams, much to his surprise. That night, Arisugawa challenges Desumi to a fight, but is quickly defeated. She wakes up in Desumi's lap, where she questions why she did not expose them. Arisugawa reveals that she joined the Gelato 5 due to her love for Fudo, and was inspired in the past by Desumi, who defended her from bullies at school. As she cares deeply for both, she did not want to ruin their happiness. They tearfully embrace, and while walking back, Arisugawa jokingly warns Desumi that she will take Fudo for herself if she is not careful.
5	"Just the Way You Are"; Transliteration: "Ari no Mama no Kimi de" (Japanese: ありのままのきみで)	Kamadon	Satoru Sugizawa	Takashi Iida	May 6, 2022
Following a meeting with Bosslar, fellow villain Steel Princess reveals to Desumi that despite her unappealing demeanor, she has fallen in love. Desumi immediately agrees to help, and alongside a reluctant Beast Princess, attempts to teach Steel about femininity. However, their attempt goes awry, only making Steel even less confident in herself. After telling Fudo about the situation, he advises Desumi to help Steel to accept herself as she is. Desumi and Beast enter Steel's dressing room, where, after dodging her anguish-driven attacks, Desumi manages to tell Steel to be herself and accept her feelings. Crying, Steel takes her armor off, and gathers the courage to confess her feelings to Culverin Bear. Sometime later, Arisugawa helps keep Desumi and Fudo hidden during a fight against Gekko. After Arisugawa leaves, Desumi attempts to feed lunch to Fudo, but he suffers from a sudden appendicitis. In the hospital, Desumi visits Fudo, and finally manages to feed him, much to his delight. However, before they can kiss, Fudo's mother appears and takes Desumi away for a volleyball match. After the game, Fudo's mother shows Desumi his baby pictures, and asks her to take care of him.
6	"As Long as We're at the Beach..."; Transliteration: "Sekkaku no Bīchi Nan Dashi" (Japanese: せっかくのビーチなんだし)	Kazuo Nogami	Satoru Sugizawa	Toshiyuki Fujisawa, Yūki Kinoshita	May 13, 2022
Bosslar announces that Desumi has been chosen for a promotion, which involves her being fused with a gorilla. While she receives support, Desumi doubts if she wants to do it. That night, she receives a call from her family, as her father explains that her promotion has made them all proud. Her normally shy little sister Urami tells Desumi that she sees her as her idol, and wishes to join Gekko some day. She reunites with Fudo, who tells her to follow her feelings. The next day, Desumi turns down the promotion, much to Bosslar's delight. Sometime later, Gekko is at the beach after Fudo told Desumi they would be testing a new robot there. Gelato 5's new submarine arrives for a test drive, so Desumi reunites with Fudo. Beast, hiding behind a rock, mistakes Fudo and Desumi's activities as torture. That night, Desumi joins the Gelato 5 for dinner, where Jinguji thanks Desumi for making Fudō a better man. They watch the fireworks and burn sparklers, while Beast mistakes an explosion inadvertently caused by Big Gelato as Desumi's doing. On the train ride back, Daigo analyzes a picture of Desumi and Fudo closely.
7	"Desumi Magahara Is the Monster I Made"; Transliteration: "Magahara Desumi wa Ore ga Umidashita Monsutā Nanda" (Japanese: 禍原デス美はオレが生み出したモンスターなんだ)	Kanji Wakabayashi	Satoru Sugizawa	Yūki Kinoshita, Kanji Wakabayashi	May 20, 2022
Daigo collapses when he hears Desumi's name. When asked about it, Daigo tells Fudo about their past. Ten years prior, Daigo was a pupil in a karate academy until Desumi arrived one day, where he discovered how absurdly powerful she truly was. Sometime later, Daigo's master closed the academy after Desumi defeated him. Daigo then offered to train her. However, despite Desumi's respect for him, he had to train hard just to remain alive. Daigo requested one final battle after Desumi reached adolescence. After she defeated him, he left her. Back in the present, Daigo expresses his desire to enlist Desumi into the Gelato 5. During an outing, Fudo presents Desumi to Daigo. While she is happy to see Daigo again, she declines his offer. Seeing how Desumi acts with Fudo, Daigo believes love has made her weak, and challenges her once again. He tells her that she will leave Fudō and join the Gelato 5 if he wins, prompting Desumi to beat him instantly. Walking home, Desumi feels uncomfortable that the Gelato 5 already knows of their romance, and advises Fudo to keep their guard up. Unbeknownst to them, a mysterious girl captures them on camera.
8	"Everybody Has a Secret or Two"; Transliteration: "Dare Datte Himitsu no Hitotsu-ya Futatsu Arusa" (Japanese: 誰だって秘密のひとつやふたつあるさ)	Takanori Yano	Satoru Sugizawa	Megumi Soga, Kōhei Hatano	May 27, 2022
Fudo receives a picture of him and Desumi. Meanwhile at school, Desumi is teased by a girl named Hojo. That night, Fudo meets with the mysterious sender of the picture, who turns out to be Hojo. She threatens to blackmail him if he does not break up with Desumi. Hojo then attempts to have him kiss her hand, but she runs away out of embarrassment. Once Desumi is informed of the situation, she reaches to the conclusion that the girl loves Fudo. The next day, he kindly rejects Hojo, but she reveals she is actually in love with Desumi. After Hojo explains how she and Desumi first met, Fudo commends her for her taste. Hojo leaves, as is it revealed she is actually the masked Heat Princess. Sometime later, Fudo agrees to tutor Arisugawa, and Desumi tags along. They study in Desumi's room, but they only succeed in confusing her with their unusual methods. After Arisugawa leaves, Fudo reveals to Desumi that he intends to become a teacher. As such, she states her desire to study with him, wanting to be a witness to his journey. Their moment is interrupted by the arrival of Desumi's father.
9	"My Big Sister Has Changed"; Transliteration: "Onee-chan wa Kawatte Shimatta" (Japanese: お姉ちゃんは変わってしまった)	Kamadon	Satoru Sugizawa	Takashi Iida	June 3, 2022
Desumi's father, a former Gekko soldier, chastises her for declining her promotion. When Fudo comes to her defense, he is silenced by Urami. Desumi's father tells her that she must devote herself to Gekko after she finishes high school, but Fudo tells him that she desires to go to university. Fudo gets Desumi's father approval after he commends his skill to be defeated "spectacularly". He then leaves, agreeing to postpone the matter. Sometime later, Urami remembers the moment she began admiring Desumi. Desumi tours Urami around Gekko headquarters, but the latter is disheartened when Desumi is friendly with her coworkers. During a shopping trip, a disappointed Urami leaves Desumi. In a corner, she remembers how much her family told her about Desumi's success as a member of Gekko when she was little, and how she finally came out of her room when she heard of Desumi's promotion, expressing her desire to be like her. Back in the present, Urami is approached by some thugs, but Desumi deals with them. Desumi tells Urami to find love, explaining that it is needed to become stronger. Urami finally accepts who Desumi is now, but continues to disapprove of Fudo.
10	"Atop the Kokutei Moon"; Transliteration: "Kokutei no Tsuki no Ue de" (Japanese: 黒帝の月の上で)	Kentarō Tanaka, Yumeka Shimada	Satoru Sugizawa	Kanji Wakabayashi, Megumi Soga, Kazuya Iwata	June 10, 2022
Desumi briefs Fudō about her high school's culture festival, including an event called the "Kokutei Moon", which is said to create lifelong couples out of people who have their picture taken on it. As such, they resolve to go together. Fudo attends the festival, but is quickly recognized and swarmed by fawning students while carrying Ojino (who shows-off for his female fans) on his shoulders. Meanwhile, Desumi is constantly harassed by Hojo, all while Beast is patrolling the school. Desumi and Fudo manage to meet in a haunted house, but their moment is quickly ruined by Beast. Once the Kokutei Moon is unveiled, Desumi and Fudo rush to its location. Desumi finally manages to get rid of Hojo when she sets her up to fight with the Blood Princess. She then reunites with Fudo, who is left alone when Ojino chases after Beast. With only five minutes left, they begin losing hope. However, when they see Steel was fooled by a student wearing a costume similar to Culverin Bear, they switch into their respective outfits, and people confuse them as cosplayers. As such, they succeed in having their picture taken, promising to live to see their relationship be accepted by everyone.
11	"What's the Point of Getting Closer?"; Transliteration: "Nakayoku Natte Nanika Imi Aru?" (Japanese: 仲良くなって何か意味ある？)	Kazuo Nogami	Satoru Sugizawa	Toshinori Fukushima	June 17, 2022
The quiet Judgment Princess always tries to avoid social interactions. As such, Desumi tricks her into attending a sleepover with the other Princesses in her room. They eat takoyaki, watch movies, and mess around. They then talk about romance, and Judgment asks about what love is. She then teases Desumi when she detects that she is in love. That night, Desumi thanks Judgment for coming, and she admits she had a good time. Sometime later, Desumi and Fudo hang out in a snowy refuge, and Fudo tells her of a book signing event for his new book. However, she catches a cold and is cared for by the Blood Princess. Beast then rushes to save her, as she tells Steel how Blood brainwashes her patients into acting as babies. They find Desumi dressed as one, and they are both captured when they try to save her. When Fudo infiltrates the school, he finds Desumi in this state. Embarrassed, he reads her his book, which snaps her back to normal. He tearily tells her that nobody came to his event, so Desumi excitedly receives his first autograph. Meanwhile, Blood holds Beast and Steel hostage, treating them as babies as well.
12	"Eternal Rivals"; Transliteration: "Eien no Raibaru" (Japanese: 永遠のライバル)	Kanji Wakabayashi	Satoru Sugizawa	Kōhei Hatano, Hiroki Itai	June 24, 2022
Fudo tells Desumi that he has been hired to appear in a wedding commercial, which includes a cake-cutting scene with a famous idol. When she tells him that he cannot accept the role, he accuses her of being selfish. Once she leaves, Arisugawa makes Fudo understand the pain Desumi is feeling. Elsewhere, Bosslar showcases the Ultimate Phantom, a monster created from negative energy. The Phantom turns out to be too strong, as it absorbs the powers of those it consumes. After it escapes, the Phantom attacks the shoot, and while Fudō gets everyone to safety, a cake he made for Desumi is destroyed. The rest of Gelato 5, Beast, and Steel then try to fight the Phantom, to no avail. Big Gelato explains to Fudō that the only way to defeat the Phantom is by combining the Gelato 5 weapons into one sword, the Gelato Claymore. When Desumi arrives, she finds Fudo's cake. Desumi then helps him hold the Claymore, and together, they manage to slice the Phantom. Afterwards, the Phantom is reduced to a baby, and Desumi attacks Fudo again to keep their ruse going when they are interviewed, promising to see each other again.

== Reception ==
The series was nominated for the Eisner Award for Best Digital Comic in 2022.

The anime adaptation's first episode garnered positive reviews from Anime News Network's staff during the Spring 2022 season previews. James Beckett called it "an extremely cute and surprisingly well-produced romantic comedy", but also critiqued that it could "easily suffer from diminishing returns" with lesser animation and an overreliance on the same jokes. Richard Eisenbeis found the Fudo-Desumi relationship "ultra-cute" and having "a sprinkle of social commentary", but felt the tokusatsu content lacked "subversion" and caused the series to feel "painfully predictable and almost boring" when away from the main couple, concluding that he would check out the manga to see if he might watch more of the show. Rebecca Silverman called it "equal parts super sentai sendup and gooey romcom, and it looks like those two things are going to mesh just as well here as they do in the source manga." Nicholas Dupree praised the production for keeping the Super Sentai humor fresh while displaying some "A+ romcom blushing", "cool fight choreography" and proper cheesecake in its fan service, concluding that: "I'm not going to tell you this show is deep or thought-provoking or even particularly romantic, but what I will say is I had a big dumb grin on my face the entire episode."

Fellow ANN editor Lynzee Loveridge chose Love After World Domination as her pick for the Best Anime of Spring 2022, praising Fudo and Desumi's relationship throughout the series, concluding that: "Love After World Domination isn't going to break the mold. Sometimes the animation is limited and the art doesn't always hold up either, but I enjoyed watching it with my husband every week and it always left us with a smile." Allen Moody, writing for THEM Anime Reviews, felt the series' outlandish premise was too tame and restrained in execution, the Fudo-Desumi pairing "disappointingly conventional" and a lack of focus on the supporting cast, concluding that: "[And] while some of the jokes work just fine, there were some missed opportunities as well."

== See also ==
- Ningyohime no Gomen ne Gohan, another manga series by the same authors
- No Longer Allowed in Another World, another manga series by the same authors
- Go! Go! Loser Ranger!, another manga/anime series inspired by Super Sentai
- The Red Ranger Becomes an Adventurer in Another World, another manga/anime series inspired by Super Sentai
