= It's a Little Late, but I've Fallen in Love with My Childhood Friend =

Japanese mixed-media project

- First light novel volume cover

今さらですが、幼なじみを好きになってしまいました (Imasara desu ga, Osananajimi o Suki ni Natteshimaimashita)
- Genre: Romantic comedy
- Created by: Fumiaki Maruto; Yom
- Novel series
- Written by: Fumiaki Maruto
- Published by: Note
- Original run: December 25, 2023 – present
- Manga
- Written by: Fumiaki Maruto
- Illustrated by: Yom
- Published by: Note
- Original run: December 25, 2023 – present
- Light novel
- Written by: Fumiaki Maruto
- Illustrated by: Yom
- Published by: ASCII Media Works
- Imprint: Dengeki Bunko
- Original run: August 8, 2025 – present
- Volumes: 2
- Manga
- Written by: Fumiaki Maruto
- Illustrated by: Yom
- Published by: Media Factory
- English publisher: NA: Yen Press
- Imprint: MF Comics
- Magazine: KadoComi (Web Comic Apanta)
- Original run: February 17, 2025 – present
- Volumes: 2

It's a Little Late, but I've Fallen in Love with My Childhood Friend (Note: Japanese: 今さらですが、幼なじみを好きになってしまいました, Hepburn: Imasara desu ga, Osananajimi o Suki ni Natteshimaimashita), also known as Saranami (さらなみ) for short, is a Japanese mixed-media project created by Fumiaki Maruto and Yom. It consists of a web novel series written by Maruto and a manga version illustrated by Yom, both of which began serialization on the blogging platform Note in December 2023. The novel was later picked up for publication by ASCII Media Works under its Dengeki Bunko imprint, which began publishing it as a light novel in August 2025; two volumes have been released as of March 2026. The manga version has also been serialized by Media Factory under its Web Comic Apanta label since February 2025, with two volumes published as of March 2026.

== Plot ==
Hikari Shirasaka, a 16-year-old high school student, has long been childhood friends with her neighbor Yuu Takamura. Although they have known each other for a long time, with Hikari often visiting his home, only recently she has realized that she has developed feelings for him. Now realizing that she loves him, she hopes that Yuu will realize her romantic interest in him and they can move beyond being just friends.

== Characters ==
Hikari Shirasaka (白坂 陽花梨, Shirasaka Hikari)
Yuu's childhood friend and neighbor. She has known Yuu for ten years, but until recently was so close to him that she treated him more like family than someone she had feelings for. She calls Yuu Taa-kun (タ～くん, Tā-kun).
Yuu Takamura (高村 夕, Takamura Yū)
Hikari's childhood friend, who remains oblivious to her growing feelings towards him. He previously failed his high school entrance exams, which upset him as it meant going to a different school from Hikari. This leads him to befriend Ayami Sudo. He and Ayami briefly dated, although they eventually broke up.
Ayami Sudo (須藤 絢深, Sudō Ayami)
Yuu's former girlfriend, who is a year older than he is. She previously avoided going to school, before befriending Yuu.

== Media ==
=== Novels ===
The project was launched on December 25, 2023, when Fumiaki Maruto released the first novel chapter on the Japanese blogging platform Note. The web novel was later picked up for publication by ASCII Media Works, which began publishing it as a light novel under its Dengeki Bunko imprint with illustrations by Yom. The first volume was released on August 8, 2025; two volumes have been released as of March 10, 2026.

| No. | Release date | ISBN |
|---|---|---|
| 1 | August 8, 2025 | 978-4-04-916347-6 |
| 2 | March 10, 2026 | 978-4-04-916805-1 |
| 3 | December 10, 2026 | 978-4-04-952311-9 |

=== Manga ===
A web manga series illustrated by Yom began serialization on X (formerly Twitter) and the series' Note page on December 25, 2023. It later began serialization under Media Factory's Web Comic Apanta label on their KadoComi and other online services on February 17, 2025. The first tankōbon volume was released on August 8, 2025; two volumes have been released as of March 10, 2026. The manga version is licensed in English by Yen Press.

| No. | Original release date | Original ISBN | English release date | English ISBN |
|---|---|---|---|---|
| 1 | August 8, 2025 | 978-4-04-685016-4 | — | — |
| 2 | March 10, 2026 | 978-4-04-685695-1 | — | — |
| 3 | December 10, 2026 | 978-4-04-660733-1 | — | — |

== See also ==
- Ganbare Doukichan, a series of illustrations by the same illustrator
- Miru Tights, a series of illustrations by the same illustrator
- Saekano, a light novel series by the same author
