= Ningyohime no Gomen ne Gohan =

Japanese manga series

- First tankōbon volume cover

人魚姫のごめんねごはん
- Genre: Gourmet
- Manga
- Written by: Hiroshi Noda
- Illustrated by: Takahiro Wakamatsu
- Published by: Shogakukan
- Magazine: Yawaraka Spirits
- Original run: January 11, 2017 – April 24, 2019
- Volumes: 7
- icon

Ningyohime no Gomen ne Gohan (人魚姫のごめんねごはん; lit. 'The Mermaid Princess' Guilty Meal'), also known as Forbidden Fish is Sweeeetest!!!, is a Japanese manga series written by Hiroshi Noda and illustrated by Takahiro Wakamatsu. It was serialized on Shogakukan's Yawaraka Spirits website from January 2017 to April 2019, with its chapters collected in seven tankōbon volumes.

== Plot ==
The mermaid princess Era is distraught when her fish friends are caught by fishermen. She takes human form and enters a restaurant to pay her final respects to her fish friends, but when she is encouraged to take a bite, she becomes addicted to seafood, much to her dismay. She is filled with self-loathing as she stays with a human family and cannot resist ordering seafood.

== Publication ==
Written by Hiroshi Noda and illustrated by Takahiro Wakamatsu, Ningyohime no Gomen ne Gohan was serialized on Shogakukan's Yawaraka Spirits website from January 11, 2017, to April 24, 2019. Shogakukan collected its chapters in seven tankōbon volumes, released from May 12, 2017, to June 12, 2019.

From January 12–26, 2022, eight promotional videos were released in three weekly batches on YouTube, starring Azusa Tadokoro as Princess Era, and other roles were played by members of the Wonder Space company.

=== Volumes ===
No.	Japanese release date	Japanese ISBN
1	May 12, 2017	978-4-09-189554-7
Chapters 1–2; Extra chapter "Remi's Special Recipes" (レミおばちゃんのとっておきレシピ); 3. "Smells Like My Friend"; 4. "Who's Next?"; 5. "Era Arrived in Wonderland"; Chapter 6
2	September 12, 2017	978-4-09-189669-8
Chapters 7–12
3	January 12, 2018	978-4-09-189770-1
Chapters 13–14; Extra chapter "Remi's Special Cinema" (デミおじさんのとっておきシネマ); Chapters 15–18
4	June 12, 2018	978-4-09-860009-0
Chapters 19–20; Extra chapter "Marumi's Diet Just By Watching" (丸実姉さんの観るだけダイエット); Chapter 21; 22. "On Her Princess's Request"; Chapter 23; 24. "Last nite she said Oh baby I eat my friend"
5	October 12, 2018	978-4-09-860107-3
Chapters 25–26; 27. Don't Eat Fish Meat! (魚肉喰うな！); 28. Our Last Kiss Had the Flavor of Sashimi (最期のキスは刺身の flavor がした); Chapter 29; 30. A Sad But Lovely Tale About Fish Meat. (切なくも愛おしい魚肉の物語。); Extra chapter "Surprising Prophecy of Masutradamus" (鱒(マス)トラダムスのびっくり大予言)
6	April 12, 2019	978-4-09-860263-6
Chapters 31–32; 33. "Every Human Being is Just Normal, and Every Encounter is Special..." (人間なんて誰だって とても普通で、出会いはどれだって特別だろう一); Chapter 34; 35. "The Crime Scene is on Your Tongue. As always, The culprit is You." (事件現場は舌(ベロ)の上。 犯人はいつもお前だ。); 36. "Princess Era's Drawing Song" (エラ姫様の絵描き歌)
7	June 12, 2019	978-4-09-860345-9
Chapters 37–38; 39. "Gluttony"; Chapter 40; Final chapter; Bonus: Promotional chapter 1 "Sango's Message" (サンゴの伝言); Promotional chapter 2 "Princess Era's Mystery" (Princessエラの謎); Promotional chapter 3 "And to the Legend..." (そして伝説へ...); Promotional chapter 4 "Brick and Hamoty" (ブリック・アンド・ハモーティ); Promotional chapter 5 "Manifest" (マニフェスト); Promotional chapter 6 "Legend of the Hungry Princess" (餓姫伝説); Extra chapter "When the Acacia Rain Stops" (アカシヤの雨がやむとき); Niconico Special Project "My Name Wanted" (ボクの名前 大募集)

== See also ==
- No Longer Allowed in Another World, another manga series by the same authors
- Love After World Domination, another manga series by the same authors
