= No Longer Allowed in Another World =

Japanese manga series

- First tankōbon volume cover, featuring Sensei

異世界失格 (Isekai Shikkaku)
- Genre: Dark comedy; Dark fantasy; Isekai
- Manga
- Written by: Hiroshi Noda
- Illustrated by: Takahiro Wakamatsu
- Published by: Shogakukan
- English publisher: NA: Seven Seas Entertainment; SEA: Shogakukan Asia
- Magazine: Yawaraka Spirits
- Original run: October 2, 2019 – present
- Volumes: 15
- Anime television series
- Directed by: Shigeki Kawai
- Written by: Yasuhiro Nakanishi
- Music by: Kenichiro Suehiro
- Studio: Atelier Pontdarc
- Licensed by: Crunchyroll
- Original network: AT-X, Tokyo MX, BS11, MBS, TVh, RKB, Mētele
- Original run: July 9, 2024 – September 24, 2024
- Episodes: 12
- icon

No Longer Allowed in Another World (Japanese: 異世界失格, Hepburn: Isekai Shikkaku) is a Japanese manga series written by Hiroshi Noda and illustrated by Takahiro Wakamatsu. It has been serialized on Shogakukan's Yawaraka Spirits website since October 2019. An anime television series adaptation produced by Atelier Pontdarc aired from July to September 2024.

The title of the series and its protagonist are a reference to Osamu Dazai, author of the novel No Longer Human, who died by lovers' suicide.

== Premise ==
A depressed author only known as Sensei makes a suicide pact with his girlfriend Sacchan by a raging river. However, they are struck by a truck before they can jump. Sensei suddenly finds himself in another world, where an elf priestess named Annette says she summoned him to be a hero. He ignores her and wanders off, desiring only to die. After inadvertently saving a catgirl he names Tama, he realizes that Sacchan might have arrived in this other world as well, and vows to reunite with her to complete their suicide pact.

== Characters ==
Sensei (センセー)
Voiced by: Hiroshi Kamiya (Japanese); Nicholas Markgraf (English)
A man with incredible bad luck, denied even his desire to die. After realizing his lover Sacchan might also have arrived in the other world, he decides to keep living until he reunites with her to complete their suicide pact.
His ability Storyteller manifests from the stories he writes, and has the power to send Other Worlders back to Earth. His constant consumption of painkillers has also "poisoned" his body—which can lethally transfer to others that try to directly drain him of his blood or life force.
Annette (アネット, Anetto)
Voiced by: Rumi Okubo (Japanese); Alexis Tipton (English)
The elf who summoned Sensei to her world using the truck. She is shocked Sensei does not care about being a hero, and frequently suspects that he has affairs with Tama and other women. She clearly has feeling for Sensei and is shown to be jealous when he gets close to other women.
Tama (タマ) / Matilda (マチルダ, Machiruda)
Voiced by: Sayumi Suzushiro (Japanese); Rachel Thompson (English)
A cat girl who studied martial arts. She is also the princess of her home kingdom whose real name is Matilda, but Sensei first called her Tama and the name stuck.
Nir (ニア, Nia)
Voiced by: Makoto Koichi
An orphan who scammed visitors to his town by promising connections with Other Worlders until Sensei rescued him from actual, malevolent Other Worlders. He joins the team as a warrior using his dad's sword.
Melos (メロス, Merosu)
Voiced by: Hina Kino
Annette's pet demon who takes a liking to Sensei. Melos can shapeshift into different objects such as carpets and pillows.
Sacchan (さっちゃん)
Voiced by: Reina Ueda (Japanese); Erin Nicole Lundquist (English)
Sensei's lover, summoned to the other world by the same truck. She is one of the seven evil other worlders known as the Fallen Angels.
Waldelia (ウォーデリア, Wōdelia)
Voiced by: Aoi Yūki
The daughter of the deceased Wrathful Dark Lord. She has sworn vengeance against all Other Worlders, especially the Fallen Angels that slew her father.
Ysha (イーシャ, Īsha)
Voiced by: Mai Nakahara
Annette's superior before she quit.
Wolf (ヴォルフ, Vorufu)
Voiced by: Nobunaga Shimazaki
A bishop known for his superior wind magic and his playboy tendencies. He was later revealed to have been Yuriko's former master and was the one responsible for turning her into the monster that she became.
Suzuki (スズキ)
Voiced by: Nobuhiko Okamoto
Frequently tormented and bullied by others on Earth, Suzuki abused his ability Total Obedience to psychically enslave anyone he touched on the forehead, as a form of revenge fantasy. It is revealed that he was severely bullied back in his world and after being summoned decided to use his skills to protect himself from others. He was the first person that was sent back to his world by Sensei.
Kaibara (カイバラ)
Voiced by: Daisuke Ono
One of the seven evil other worlders known as The Fallen Angels. His ability, Gluttony, summons a giant mouth that lets him consume anything and use their abilities. In his previous world, he was born into a rich family but he found his life boring as got everything he wanted but he felt no sense of thrill from it at all. He was killed by Waldelia after he was defeated by Tama after attempting to take over her country.
Yuriko (ユリコ)
Voiced by: Konomi Kohara
Greed, one of the seven Fallen Angels, wields life-draining tendrils that turn victims into skeletal warriors. Once a caretaker for her ill younger sister, she grew bitter after being summoned to another world when Wolf favored her sister over her. This resentment triggered her transformation, leading her to absorb her sister. They later reconciled and were sent home by Sensei.
Sengoku (センゴク)
Voiced by: Tomokazu Sugita
A powerful knight and one of the seven fallen angels.
Charlotte (シャルロット, Sharurotto)
Voiced by: Inori Minase
The princess of the Kingdom of Rott. Her father asks Sensei to pick a suitor for her, but Sensei instead teaches her that she should make these decisions for herself.
Thomas (トマス, Tomasu)
Voiced by: Chafurin
The king of the kingdom of Rott, he tried to have his daughter pick someone to marry, however he learned how foolish he was and decided to make his daughter the new queen of their country.
Otto (オットー, Ottō)
Voiced by: Jun Fukuyama
A traveling Bard and one of the princess's marriage candidates. In truth, all he cared about was his music and nothing more.
Kōtarō (コータロー)
Voiced by: Yoshitsugu Matsuoka
An other worlder with the ability to summon an endless supply of money from his hands. He was Suzuki's lackey until his defeat, his current whereabouts are unknown.
Tuxedo Man (タキシードの男, Takishīdo no Otoko)
Voiced by: Katsuyuki Konishi
One of the seven fallen angels and their leader.
Elton (エルトン, Eruton)
Voiced by: Kenta Miyake
Elton is one of the many Bishops in the other world.
Miller (ミラー, Mirā)
Voiced by: Nobuo Tobita
The Cardinal of the Church.
Aria (アリア)
Voiced by: Saya Aizawa
The bishop who took Annette's place after she quit.
Pope (教皇, Kyōkō)
Voiced by: Takehito Koyasu
The leader of the Church and the one responsible for summoning people to the fantasy world.
Esche (エッシェ, Esshe)
Voiced by: Mamiko Noto
The proprietor of a tavern catering to other workers in Toneriko, as well as an exotic dancer. It is revealed later on that she was actually the spirit of the world tree, she ended up abandoning Toneriko after the villagers kicked her out, unaware of her true identity. As a result, the world tree withered away, she gifted Sensei with an infinite supply of sleeping pills for trying to help her.
Yamada (ヤマダ)
Voiced by: Yuma Uchida
An otherworlder like Sensei, he has a strong sense of justice and desired to help the people in the other world. He decided to help those in Toneriko by taking out the otherworlder that set up a casino in the village. However, this backfired as the villagers not only kicked Esche out of town, but decided to continue the world tree leaves smoking business. He was left horrified of what his actions had caused.
Saitō (サイトウ)
Voiced by: Yutaka Aoyama
Saito is a disabled man who secretly supports the orphanage housing Nir and her siblings. In his past life, a kind high school student once aided him, but when Saito later witnessed the same boy being brutally bullied, fear paralyzed him and he fled. Wracked with guilt over his inaction, he dedicates himself to helping Nir's orphanage as penance. After confronting his guilt and insecurities, Sensei returns him to his original world.
Tōru (トオル)
Voiced by: Kazuyuki Okitsu
Toru, another otherworlder, initially clashes with Sensei and the others but changes his ways after repeated defeats, eventually assisting them in their struggles.

== Media ==
=== Manga ===
Written by Hiroshi Noda and illustrated by Takahiro Wakamatsu, No Longer Allowed in Another World started on Shogakukan's Yawaraka Spirits website on October 2, 2019. The series entered a three-month hiatus on June 25, 2025, and resumed with its final arc upon its return on October 29. Shogakukan has collected its chapters into individual tankōbon volumes. The first volume was released on April 10, 2020. As of July 10, 2026, 15 volumes have been released.

The manga is licensed in North America by Seven Seas Entertainment. The first volume was released in January 2023. In Southeast Asia, the manga is licensed by Shogakukan Asia.

==== Volumes ====
No.	Original release date	Original ISBN	English release date	English ISBN
1	April 10, 2020	978-4-09-860560-6	January 3, 2023	978-1-63858-585-5
2	July 10, 2020	978-4-09-860650-4	April 11, 2023	978-1-63858-745-3
3	October 12, 2020	978-4-09-860747-1	July 11, 2023	978-1-63858-913-6
4	February 12, 2021	978-4-09-860847-8	November 7, 2023	978-1-68579-605-1
5	July 12, 2021	978-4-09-861104-1	March 12, 2024	979-8-88843-330-0
6	January 12, 2022	978-4-09-861274-1	July 16, 2024	979-8-88843-479-6
7	July 12, 2022	978-4-09-861377-9	November 12, 2024	979-8-88843-480-2
8	November 10, 2022	978-4-09-861534-6	March 11, 2025	979-8-89160-561-9
9	June 12, 2023	978-4-09-861832-3	July 29, 2025	979-8-89373-019-7
10	February 9, 2024	978-4-09-862743-1	December 9, 2025	979-8-89373-568-0
11	June 28, 2024	978-4-09-862884-1	May 19, 2026	979-8-89373-706-6
12	September 11, 2024	978-4-09-863057-8	October 20, 2026	979-8-89561-386-3
13	April 11, 2025	978-4-09-863455-2	March 9, 2027	979-8-89765-632-5
14	January 9, 2026	978-4-09-863749-2	—	—
15	July 10, 2026	978-4-09-864055-3	—	—

=== Anime ===
An anime television series adaptation was announced in July 2022. It is produced by Atelier Pontdarc and directed by Shigeki Kawai, with scripts written by Yasuhiro Nakanishi, characters designed by Tomoshige Inayoshi and Asako Inayoshi, monsters designed by Kenji Terao, and music composed by Kenichiro Suehiro. The series aired from July 9 to September 24, 2024, on AT-X and other networks. The opening theme song is "Shura Nikki" (修羅日記; lit. 'Shura Diary') performed by Kashitaro Ito, while the ending theme song is "Sayonara, Subarashiki Sekai yo" (さよなら、素晴らしき世界よ; lit. 'Goodbye, Wonderful World') performed by Mayu Maeshima.

Crunchyroll streamed the series.

==== Episodes ====
No.	Title	Directed by	Storyboarded by	Original release date
1	"I Must Commit Double-Suicide!"; Transliteration: "Shinjū Se ne ba!" (Japanese: 心中せねば！)	Ryūta Imaizumi	Shigeki Kawai	July 9, 2024
Sensei and his girlfriend Sacchan make a suicide pact, but before they can do anything, they are hit by a truck. Sensei wakes up in a temple where the elf priestess Annette says she summoned him as a hero to take on the Dark Lord. She is shocked when she checks his stats and finds he has no increased physical traits or special skills. He is uninterested in being a hero and attempts suicide. When she stops him, he leaves. His different attitude compared to other summoned heroes makes her fall in love with him. Sensei meets a catgirl being attacked by a Death Tree. He is unenthusiastic about helping and the tree grabs him and tries to drain his life force, only to get poisoned instead. He calls the catgirl Tama. Offended, she tries to introduce herself, but he keeps ignoring or interrupting her. They go to the temple and Annette is jealous seeing Sensei and Tama together. Sensei wants to find Sacchan so they can complete their suicide pact. The two girls offer to travel with him, but he sleeps in a coffin and makes them pull it.
2	"Shall I Tell You How It Feels to Sleep in a Coffin?"; Transliteration: "Kanoke no Negokochi o Oshie te Age yō ka?" (Japanese: 棺桶の寝心地を教えてあげようか？)	Ryo Ishimaru	Shigeki Kawai	July 16, 2024
The trio has an audience with King Thomas and Princess Charlotte. Thomas asks for help picking which of Charlotte's suitors to marry, the heroic knight Gomes or the minstrel and Charlotte's childhood friend Otto. Sensei calls him a fool to leave this decision to strangers. That night, as Tama and Annette argue about who can sleep next to Sensei, he leaves the room and meets Charlotte. He talks about his desire to die and she talks about how she cannot decide who to marry. He says she should consider what she truly wants, not what others think. The next day, Charlotte says she picks neither of them and would rather commit suicide with Sensei, making Annette faint. She says Otto does nothing useful except play music and Gomes is stinky, then snaps at her father for trying to make her marry when she did not want to. Infuriated, Gomes reveals he was a demon in disguise and attacks them with Tama defending them. Gomes rushes Sensei and Charlotte, and when she says she does not want to die, he pushes her out of the way. Annette revives and defends Sensei with a barrier, allowing Tama to knock Gomes into a lake. Regretful of his poor judgment, Thomas abdicates the throne and makes Charlotte the queen.
3	"I'm Ready to Die Anytime"; Transliteration: "Boku wa Itsu demo Shinu Kakugo wa Deki te Iru" (Japanese: 僕はいつでも死ぬ覚悟はできている)	Shintarō Itō	Goichi Iwahata	July 23, 2024
The trio travel to another temple run by Annette's friend Ysha, hoping Sacchan was summoned there. Annette had her familiar deliver a letter explaining why she left her own temple, but the familiar, which Sensei names Melos, returns and failed to deliver it. They meet a dragon and its rider, the dragongirl Waldelia. The meeting is civil at first, but when Waldelia learns Sensei is an otherworlder, she proclaims her hatred of otherworlders and attacks. After she beats up Annette and Tama, Sensei says it is him she wants and she impales him, only to be shocked when he does not die and asks why her eyes are sad, so she retreats. Melos drags them to Ysha who heals them. Ysha does not know Sacchan and scolds Annette for leaving her temple and traveling with an otherworlder, reminding her that everyone summoned so far was a scumbag. As Annette defends Sensei, Kōtarō, an otherworlder with the power to summon gold tries to flirt with them, but Annette smacks him away. Ysha says the Dark Lord was reported killed seven days ago. Meanwhile, Waldelia swears to avenge her father. Tama and Annette buy Sensei a suit of armor. Ysha meets him and warns him to stay away from Annette. Kōtarō announces Suzuki, the otherworlder who killed the Dark Lord. Suzuki says he is taking over and demands the people kneel. Kōtarō points out Annette as the one who smacked him, so Suzuki walks up and threatens her.
4	"Don't Kill Yourself"; Transliteration: "Jisatsu wa, Ike nai" (Japanese: 自殺は、いけない)	Shintarō Itō	Shigeki Kawai & Kenchi Kawamura	July 30, 2024
Suzuki pets Annette's head, triggering his gift, Total Obedience, turning Annette and soon after Tama into his slaves. Ysha confronts Suzuki and tells him the townspeople will not surrender to him. So he orders his beasts, Annette and Tama to attack the town. Tama attacks Sensei but gets knocked out when his helmet smacks her in the face. Ysha tells him what's going on but this appears to excite Sensei as he goes to meet Suzuki at Ysha's church. Sensei says he has become inspired by Suzuki's story of wannabe hero turned villain and wants to write a story about him. Suzuki takes offense to this and sends his beasts to attack him. The beasts are defeated by a combination of Ysha's magic, Melos using Sensei's helmet as a shield and Sensei's poison, making Kōtarō flee in terror. Suzuki sends Annette to attack them but Sensei manages to get her to free herself from Suzuki's power. Seeing no other way out Suzuki tries to kill himself but Sensei stops him and gets Suzuki to tell his backstory. Inspired by it, Sensei finishes his story, which triggers Sensei's new ability, Storyteller. This activates a summoning circle that sends Suzuki back to Earth. Ysha thinks that Sensei was sent here to fight Other Worlders. Ysha gives Sensei a new coffin and encourages Annette to stay with Sensei. A post-credit scene shows that Suzuki was sent back to Earth and got a job at a supermarket.
5	"I Am Someone Who Wishes to Die, Not a Corpse That's Already Dead"; Transliteration: "Boku wa Shini tai Hito de Atte, Shinin de wa Nai" (Japanese: 僕は死にたい人であって、死人ではない)	Ryūta Imaizumi	Ryūta Imaizumi	August 6, 2024
Ysha meets with her fellow priests and Cardinal Miller. The Cardinal confirms that seven other worlders killed the Dark King. Thus, the Pope decided to seal the portals and no longer summon other worlders. However, the seven decided to take the Dark King's throne and declare war on the rest of the world. The Pope calls them the Seven Fallen Angels. The other priests are worried until Ysha explains about Sensei and his power to send other worlders back to Earth. It is also revealed that Sacchan is one of the Fallen Angels. Meanwhile, the heroes arrive in a small village where they meet a boy named Nir, who says he will introduce them to a valiant warrior for a price. This is later shown to be a scam that Annette fell for. Later that night, Sensei runs into Nir being threatened by three other worlders. Sensei scares them off when they see his excitement at the threat of being killed and how his HP skyrockets at the thought of it. The next day as the heroes are about to leave, Nir meets them at the gate and joins their party. The team travels to Tama's hometown but are quickly arrested by the guards for unknown reasons.
6	"Someone Who Wants to Be Eaten Has Come to the Castle"; Transliteration: "Tabe rare taki Mono, Jōka yori Ki tari" (Japanese: 食べられたき者、城下よりきたり)	Ayumu Ono	Goichi Iwahata	August 13, 2024
Annette, Nir, Melos and Sensei are brought before King Syberian and are accused of kidnapping the nation's princess, revealed to be Tama whose real name is Matilda. Tama convinces her father to let her friends go in exchange for giving up on being an adventurer. That night the team meets Tama's former lady in waiting Fawna who reveals that Tama's mom and brother died in a storm and Tama tried to be an adventurer to help her father but he refuses to accept this. Meanwhile, Tama witnesses an attack on the castle by the Fallen Angel of Gluttony, Kaibara. His ability to summon a giant mouth allows him to eat anything and take on the abilities of what he consumes. King Syberian tries to fight him but loses his arm saving Tama. Tama wants to fight back but gets whisked away by her father's assistant to where the rest of the team is. Kaibara announces he has taken over the kingdom and wants to devour all of the demihumans. The team minus Tama go to confront him and Sensei gets the guards to let them in by saying he wants to get eaten. Tama meanwhile escapes the assistant and confronts Kaibara directly.
7	"Will You Sentence Me to Death Again?"; Transliteration: "Mata Shikei ni demo Suru kane?" (Japanese: また死刑にでもするかね？)	Shintarō Itō	Shigeki Kawai & Kenchi Kawamura	August 20, 2024
Tama fights against Kaibara but is attacked by King Syberian's own skills thanks to Kaibara's Gluttony ability. Meanwhile Sensei and the others break into Queen Lampala's old room to steal her diary. Kaibara's backstory is shown about being a spoiled rich kid who attacked other people to feel alive. Kaibara is about to consume Tama but is stopped by Sensei. Annette tries to get Sensei to use his power but he refuses, believing that Kaibara's story is too boring to write about. However, he finds Tama's story much more interesting. He has Tama read her mother's diary which triggers his Storyteller ability. This time though it awakens Tama's hidden Divine Beast powers that she suppressed to appease her father. She uses her new powers to defeat Kaibara. However, he gets back up as a monster due to the flesh he consumed from the Dark King. Just then Waldelia arrives and quickly kills Kaibara before leaving when she sees Sensei is still alive. In the morning Annette, Sensei and Nir are leaving but are told Tama is staying. However, encouraged by her father, Tama rejoins the party.
8	"This Hole Stinks of Immortality"; Transliteration: "Ano Ana wa Sugoku, Haitoku no Nioi ga Suru" (Japanese: あの穴はすごく、背徳の匂いがする)	Masahiro Takada, Ryo Ishimaru & Shigeki Kawai	Shigeki Kawai	August 27, 2024
Sensei and the others stop at The World Tree and the town of Toneriko. They are surprised to find it has been taken over by other worlders and turned into a gambling town. The asks the mayor what happened and asks them to help save the dying World Tree by driving the evil other worlders out. They are aided by a hero named Yamada but Sensei wanders off after running out of sleeping pills. He finds a cave where people smoke the leaves of the World Tree but instead gets brought to a bar by a dancer named Esche and quickly becomes friends with her. Yamada destroys the casino and quickly defeats the evil other worlders. The villagers celebrate but soon turn on Esche claiming she willingly helped the evil other worlders. Sensei reveals she used her bar and skills to keep the other worlders in check and keep the villagers safe. Nobody believes him except for Yamada and the villagers force Esche out of town. Sensei and the others leave as well. Yamada becomes horrified when the mayor tells him he plans on continuing the other worlders operations and tries to hire Yamada as a bodyguard. As the heroes leave the World Tree dries up and dies. Esche reveals herself as the World Tree's spirit and as thanks for Sensei's kindness she grants him an infinite supply of his sleeping pills.
9	"Turn Me Into a Lump of Ash"; Transliteration: "Boku o Ichi Katamari no Hai ni Kaeru ga Ī" (Japanese: 僕を一塊の灰に変えるがいい)	Ryūta Imaizumi	Ryūta Imaizumi	September 3, 2024
The heroes travel through a desert region that Nir reveals is his homeland. they are attacked by bandit other worlders. Annette and Tama fight back but Nir is too afraid to draw his sword. The bandits are scared off by a howl from an alleged wolf monster. Nir guides the team to the orphanage he grew up at to spend the night. Later that night Nir runs into a mysterious man named Saitou whose been secretly donating food to the orphanage. Nir tells Saitou his story and laments his cowardice while Sensei eavesdrops and is seen writing another story. The next day the bandits return and kidnap one of the orphans. Nir is too afraid to fight again and is saved by Saitou. Saitou reveals he is an other worlder and transforms into the wolf monster and savagely defeats the bandits. Nir, afraid Saitou will lose his kind heart, draws his sword and stops him. Saitou reveals his backstory of being unable to help a kind kid from bullies due to him being bound to a wheelchair. Sensei says it was not his handicap but his own cowardice that stopped him. Nir says he is wrong and brings up his own cowardice. Saitou stops Nir and says Nir is a true valiant warrior. Seeing this triggers Sensei's ability again and creates another summoning circle to send Saitou back to Earth. He transports to just after being hit by Truck-Kun and is picked up by his friend.
10	"Reflect on Your Failure to Kill Me Properly"; Transliteration: "Kichinto Boku no Inochi o Ubawanakatta Koto wa, Hontōni Mōsei Shita Ma e" (Japanese: きちんと僕の命を奪わなかったことは、本当に猛省したまえ)	Shigeki Kawai	Masashi Watanabe	September 10, 2024
A war wages between the dwarven kingdom of Geld and an army of monsters led by the Fallen Angel of Misery. Ysha and fellow priest Wolff are helping the dwarves. Wolff summons a tornado to blast the monsters away but also hits Sensei by accident and destroys his coffin bed. Later that night Sensei and Melos follow Wolff due to Melos falling in love with Wolff's pet dubbed Femmelos by Sensei. They see him talking to a woman through her front door and assume he is talking to a woman he loves and leaves. The next day the monsters attack again but are aided by a giant dragon ridden by the Fallen Angel of Greed, Yoriko. Wolff recognizes her and is unable to stop her. Yoriko takes Wolff hostage and leaves to Dritten Temple. Without Wolff, the dwarves are forced to retreat. Sensei goes to the woman Wolff was talking to, revealed to be an old lady, to find out what happened. Tama volunteers the team to find and rescue Wolff. The dwarves give them new armor to help them. The now reformed bandit leader from last episode shows up to give the team a ride to Dritten Temple, except for Sensei because he is still upset for Sensei killing his pet scorpion monster. The old lady demands that Sensei take her to see Wolff.
11	"I Cannot Die Until I've Finished Writing Your Story"; Transliteration: "Kimi no Monogatari o Kakioeru Made wa, Shinu Wake ni Ikanai" (Japanese: 君の物語を書き終えるまでは、死ぬわけにいかない)	Shintarō Itō	Masashi Watanabe	September 17, 2024
The team confront Yuriko at the temple. She summons skeleton warriors to fight them and continues to bring them back no matter how many the team knocks down. Ysha asks Yuriko why she hates Wolff. She says she was his student and loved spending time with him. Until another girl, later shown to be her sister Hikari, was summoned and Wolff focused only on her. This caused Yuriko's power of Greed to awaken and she killed Hikari. Just as Yuriko is about to kill the team, Sensei crashes into the building with his new mobile coffin. He brings the old lady who's actually Hikari but rapidly aged due to the effects of Greed. Sensei gets the two to reveal their backstories. Hikari was a sick child and Yuriko was always forced to care for her instead of living her life. The one day she tried to, Hikari almost died and their father blamed her. This was the night Yuriko was summoned. Hikari was summoned soon after because she did not want to live in a world without her sister. The reason Wolff stopped training Yuriko was because Hikari asked him to so she could live the life that was stolen from her. Hearing all this triggers Sensei's ability, which fixes all the damage caused by Greed and sends Yuriko and Hikari back to Earth. Hikari wakes up to Yuriko opening her window. Only remembering their time in the other world as a dream.
12	"Tonight I Shall Die, I Ride So That It Will Kill Me"; Transliteration: "Kondo Koso Zettai Shinitai" (Japanese: 今度こそ絶対死にたい)	Ayumu Ono	Kenchi Kawamura & Goichi Iwahata	September 24, 2024
As the team celebrates their victory, they are confronted by the Fallen Angel of Misery. The team is unable to even hurt him but he leaves after Nir blocks and chips his sword. That night, Sensei meets Sacchan in the halls of Geld castle. He is overjoyed to see her and tries to finally complete their lover's suicide pact but she rejects him. Saying that he has changed and now has a light in his eye. Sacchan returns to the dark castle saying she still loves him and sees his new potential. Having been rejected by Sacchan sends Sensei into a spiral. He goes on a chaotic joy ride in his new mobile coffin to try and die. He speeds out of town as the others try to catch up to him. The team finds out he ended up in a mysterious cave in the town of Held. He crashes through multiple monsters before his vehicle breaks down. He finds a portal that sends him to the world of fairies and meets the fairy queen and her minions. The fairy queen deems Sensei worthy of her gift after seeing that he is not like other heroes. She gives him a whistle and tells him to keep living before sending him back. Sensei crashes into the others and a local statue. He uses the whistle to summon the fairy Solulu to fix the statue. The team continue their journey as The Pope, Fallen Angels and Waldelia all question what role Sensei is here to fulfill.

== Reception ==
In 2020, the manga was one of the nominees for the sixth Next Manga Awards in the web category.

== See also ==
- Ningyohime no Gomen ne Gohan, another manga series by the same creators
- Love After World Domination, another manga series by the same creators
