= Atelier Pontdarc =

Japanese animation studio

Atelier Pontdarc Co., Ltd.
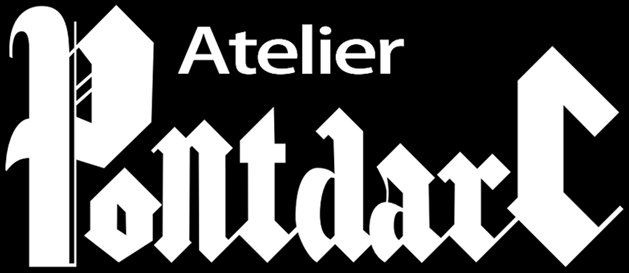
- Native name: 株式会社Atelier Pontdarc
- Romanized name: Kabushiki-gaisha Atorie Pondaruku
- Type: Kabushiki gaisha
- Industry: Animation studio
- Founded: July 2020
- Headquarters: Ogikubo, Suginami, Tokyo, Japan
- Website: pontdarc.co.jp

Atelier Pontdarc Co., Ltd. (Japanese: 株式会社Atelier Pontdarc(アトリエポンダルク), Hepburn: Kabushiki-gaisha Atorie Pondaruku) is a Japanese animation studio based in Suginami, Tokyo founded in 2020.

== History ==
Atelier Pontdarc was founded in July 2020 by White Fox animation producer Tsunaki Yoshikawa. Its first production was the original net animation Ganbare Doukichan, released in September 2021.

The studio takes its name from the Pont d'Arc, a natural bridge located in southern France; an illustration of said bridge is featured in the studio's logo.

== Works ==
=== Television series ===
Title	Director(s)	First run start date	First run end date	Eps	Note(s)	Ref(s)
Uncle from Another World	Shigeki Kawai	July 6, 2022	March 8, 2023	13	Based on a manga by Hotondoshindeiru.	
No Longer Allowed in Another World	Shigeki Kawai	July 9, 2024	September 24, 2024	12	Based on a manga by Hiroshi Noda.	
See You Tomorrow at the Food Court	Kazuomi Koga	July 7, 2025	August 11, 2025	6	Based on a manga by Shinichirō Nariie.	

=== Original net animation ===
Title	Director(s)	First run start date	First run end date	Eps	Note(s)	Ref(s)
Ganbare Doukichan	Kazuomi Koga	September 20, 2021	December 6, 2021	12	Based on the illustrations by Yom.	
