= Leg fetishism =

Sexual interest focused on the legs

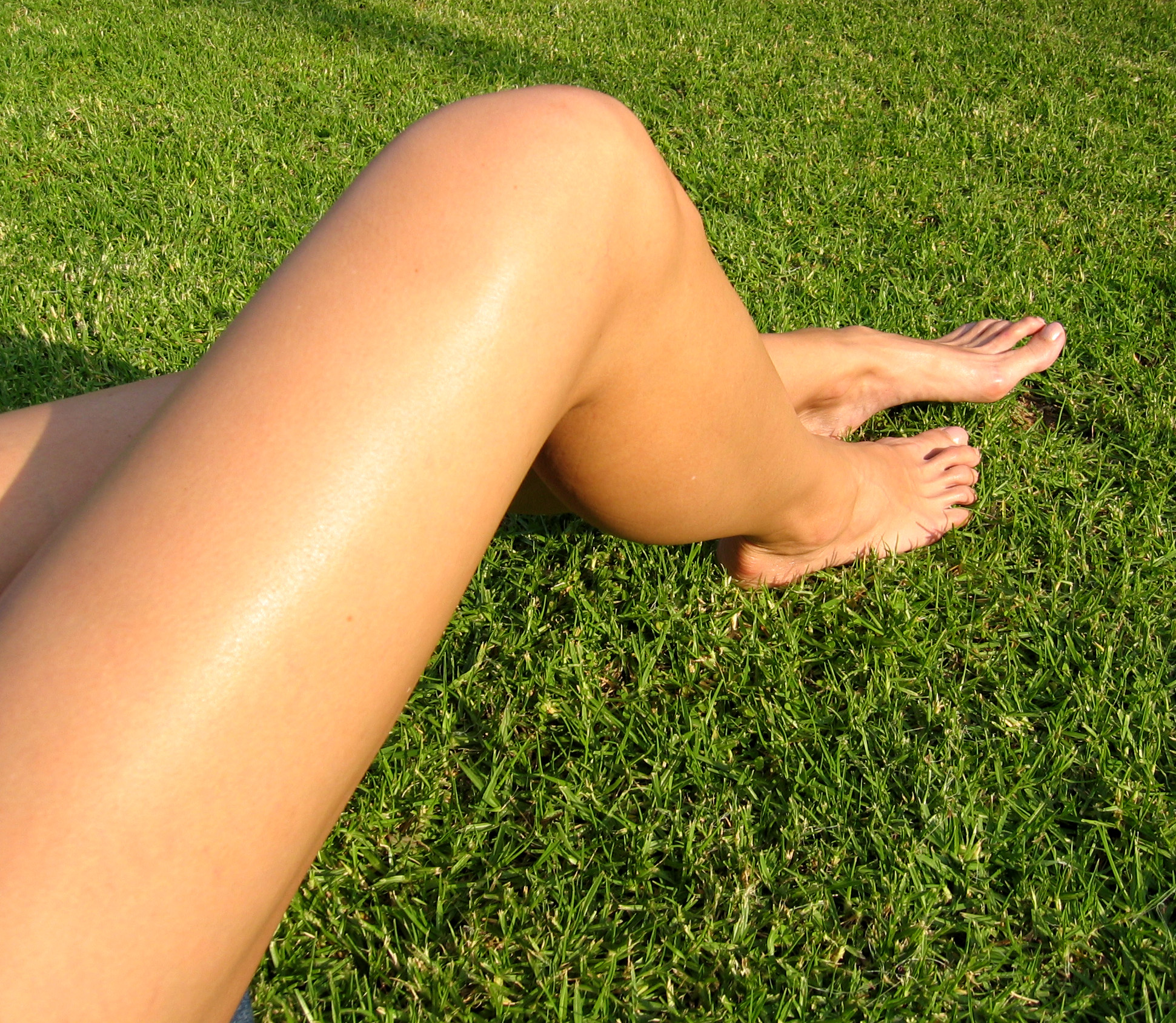
Legs of a woman

Leg fetishism (also known as crurophilia) is a sexual interest that focuses on the legs, and is a type of partialism. In leg fetishism, individuals may experience a sexual attraction to particular areas such as the thighs, knees, shin, calves or ankles.

== Characteristics ==
Common expressions of this attraction may include intimate physical interaction with the legs or simply act as a fantasy to be admired from afar.

Men self-purported to have crurophilia tend to view the legs as the most attractive part of the female body because of their seductively-teasing nature. Whereas the display of the breasts and buttocks is considerably "in your face", the presentation of the legs offers more control over how much and for how long.

Although leg fetishes are typically associated with men, they are not a gender-specific phenomenon. A 2008 study by researchers at Wroclaw University in Poland featured a sample of 200 male and female volunteers. Participants were presented with images of people with the same height but varying leg lengths. Their research supported that all genders find longer legs attractive; the majority preferred legs 5% longer than average, and the ideal female leg length was found to be 1.4 times the length of the upper body. As stated by the lead researcher, "There are good evolutionary reasons for the preference. Long legs are a sign of health." UCLA associate psychology professor Martie Haselton said, "Legginess is something that we know men prefer in mates. The news in this research is that women prefer longer legs in mates." Although leg length isn't always a sign of good health, people tend to prefer longer legs for a more attractive appearance.

== Historical and cultural background ==
Areas of the body deemed sexually desirable are affected by contemporary social norms and dress codes. A substantial portion of Victorian men famously boasted a knee or ankle fetish. This is due to the modesty of the nineteenth century which considered bare legs in public scandalous.

In the modern era, leg fetishes can often manifest as a subconscious byproduct of western media. Whereas many other cultures consider public display of the legs scandalous, the vast majority of western culture has normalized exhibition of the legs. In many other countries, shorts which reach at or below the knee are considered sufficiently modest. Yet much of western media promotes viewing female thighs. A study on sexual imagery in magazine advertising found that in 2003, 78% of women in magazine advertisements were sexually attired, much attributable to the category of "very short shorts". It is this consistent interaction with media which some ascribe to the fetishism of the legs. In this era, the knee-length dressing is mainly considered modest. Because, they cover the private parts and their adjacent parts (i.e., the thighbone) perfectly.

The widespread social acceptance of women showing their legs in public can subconsciously affect men's perceptions. In a 1981 study, both male and female subjects rated their first impressions of female job applicants in 12 outfits. The study supported that, "Male subjects found female models more physically attractive and more likable in short shorts and short skirts compared with regular lengths."

== See also ==
- Hemline
