= Obdormition =

Medical term describing numbness in a limb

Obdormition, or less commonly obdormation, (/ˌɒbdɔːrˈmɪʃən/ or /ˌɒbdɔːrˈmeɪʃən/; from Latin obdormire "to fall asleep") is temporary numbness in a limb, often caused by constant pressure on nerves or lack of movement. This is colloquially referred to as the limb being "asleep", and it is usually followed by paresthesia, colloquially called "pins and needles".
