= Neurological Sciences (journal) =

- Discipline: Neurology
- Language: English
- Edited by: Antonio Federico

Publication details
- Former name(s): Italian Journal of Neurological Sciences
- History: 1979–present
- Publisher: Springer Science+Business Media
- Frequency: Bimonthly
- Impact factor: 3.18 (2020)

Standard abbreviations
- ISO 4: Neurol. Sci.

Indexing
- ISSN: 1590-1874 (print); 1590-3478 (web)

Links
- Journal homepage; Online archive

Neurological Sciences is a bimonthly peer-reviewed medical journal covering neurology. It was established in 1979 as the Italian Journal of Neurological Sciences, obtaining its current name in 2000. The editor-in-chief is Fabrizio Tagliavini (Carlo Besta Neurological Institute). According to the Journal Citation Reports, the journal has a 2020 impact factor of 3.18.
