= Legend of Mana =

1999 action role-playing game

- North American cover art
- Developer: Square (Note: Remaster developed by M2 and Digital Works Entertainment in collaboration with Square Enix)
- Publishers: JP: Square; NA: Square Electronic Arts; WW: Square Enix (remaster)
- Director: Koichi Ishii
- Producer: Akitoshi Kawazu
- Designer: Akihiko Matsui
- Programmer: Tomoki Anazawa
- Artists: Shinichi Kameoka; Kouji Tsuda; Nao Ikeda
- Writer: Nobuyuki Inoue
- Composer: Yoko Shimomura
- Series: Mana
- Platforms: PlayStation; Nintendo Switch; PlayStation 4; Windows; Android; iOS; Xbox Series X/S
- Release: PlayStation: JP: July 15, 1999; NA: June 6, 2000; Nintendo Switch, PlayStation 4, Windows: WW: June 24, 2021; Android, iOS: WW: December 7, 2021; Xbox Series X/S: WW: September 26, 2024
- Genre: Action role-playing
- Modes: Single-player, multiplayer

Legend of Mana (Note: Known in Japan as Seiken Densetsu: Legend of Mana (聖剣伝説 レジェンド·オブ·マナ, Seiken Densetsu: Rejendo obu Mana; lit. The Legend of the Sacred Sword: Legend of Mana)) is a 1999 action role-playing game developed and published by Square for the PlayStation. It is a spin-off of the Mana series. Set in a high fantasy universe, the game follows an unnamed hero as they restore the land of Fa'Diel by creating the world around them and completing a number of interrelated quests in order to restore the Tree of Mana.

While incorporating action role-playing elements from the prior games in the series, such as real-time battles, Legend of Mana has its own distinct style of gameplay. Most notably, it gives the player the ability to shape the world's structure through the Land Make system, generating regions and quests in a non-linear gameplay system rather than a strong main plotline. Legend of Mana was directed by series creator Koichi Ishii, designed by Akihiko Matsui, and produced by veteran Square director and producer Akitoshi Kawazu.

The game had high sales, selling 400,000 copies in its first week of release and 700,000 by the end of 1999. Reviews were less positive than for prior games in the series. Critics gave considerable acclaim to its vibrant and colorful hand-drawn graphics and soundtrack by Yoko Shimomura, but were critical of the lack of a clear main storyline, stating that it left the game feeling disjointed. The game was re-released as a part of both the PlayStation's and Square's best-sellers lines. It was released as a PSOne Classic in Japan and North America. A remastered version was published by Square Enix for the Nintendo Switch, PlayStation 4 and Windows on June 24, 2021, for Android and iOS on December 7, 2021, and for Xbox Series X/S on September 26, 2024. An anime adaptation by Yokohama Animation Laboratory and Graphinica titled Legend of Mana: The Teardrop Crystal aired from October to December 2022.

== Gameplay ==
A boss battle featuring the protagonist and a Rabite pet. The party's health and special move meter is shown in the gauges at the top, and the enemy's health is shown in the bar at the bottom.

Like previous games in the Mana series, Legend of Mana displays an angled top-down perspective, in which the player characters navigate the terrain and fight off hostile creatures. The player controls the unnamed main character, and is assisted by up to two companions. One of these companions is an optional support character, which depends on what quest the player is performing, while another companion can be chosen by the player out of a roster of monsters, pets, and golems. Both companions are typically controlled by the game's AI, though a second player can take control of the support character, or load in their own character from a different save file, if present. The main character and companions each have their own set of numerical attributes including hit points and strength, which represent the amount of damage the player can take or cause. These stats grow whenever the player advances a level, after gaining enough experience points from battle with enemies.

Battles occur when the player character encounters an enemy while traversing the world. Combat takes place in real-time, and in the location the player found the enemy rather than a separate battle screen. The main character can equip a variety of weapons, armors, and accessories. Weapons let the player perform abilities in combat. Referred to as Special Techs, these abilities are powerful attacks by the main characters and support characters that can be used when the special move meter is full. This meter fills as the player damages enemies. Each weapon, such as a sword or spear, has a set number of special attacks to learn, which can hit single or multiple targets and can be assigned to different buttons on the controller.

Legend of Mana, unlike previous games in the Mana series, does not feature a set journey through a fixed world. Instead, it features a unique "Land Make" system where the player generates the structure of the game world by placing objects, named Artifacts, on empty square plots on a map. This map takes the form of a grid of spaces presented in an isometric viewpoint on a map screen. When an Artifact is placed in a space on the map, it creates a Land, and the player can enter that Land by selecting the position on the map. Adjacent Lands are not connected; to move from one land to another the player must first return to the map screen. Different Lands are generated from different Artifacts, each containing a quest which upon completion usually gives the player another Artifact to place. Lands can also contain additional quests. Each Land is ranked from 0 (no presence) to 3 (strong presence) in its strength in each Spirit of Mana; this in turn causes magic of that element to be stronger in that Land. The strength of the rankings is dependent on the Artifact, its position on the Map, and the rankings of adjacent Lands. Many locations have non-player characters who give quests and information or sell equipment. Other areas feature enemies and bosses with which the player can battle.

In addition to the main game, after certain quests are completed Legend of Mana gives the player the option to delve into optional gameplay aspects centered around the hero or heroine's house. The player can forge or improve weapons and armor using raw materials found throughout the game, or combine equipment with items to change their power or add special effects. They can grow different types of fruit in the orchard, raise pets to use as adventuring companions, create items, and build golems. Pets can also be raised with the Japan-only PocketStation peripheral, and two players can battle each other in an arena.

== Plot ==
The world map as presented in the Land Make system. Eight locations are shown; the rankings for each Spirit of Mana for the selected artifact are shown below the map.

=== Setting ===
Legend of Mana is set in the fictional world of Fa'Diel. The Mana Tree, the giver of mana and life for the world, burned down almost entirely nine centuries prior to the events of the game. A war erupted between faeries, human, and others seeking the scarce power of mana that was left. When the war concluded, the burnt Mana Tree slept as it regrew and the many lands of the world were stored in ancient artifacts. A hero, controlled by the player, is self-charged with restoring the world, and mana, to its former self. The Lands of Fa'Diel are populated with a large number of different creatures, including humans, faeries, demons, the jewel-hearted Jumi race, plant-like Sproutlings and Flowerlings, miner bears called Dudbears, and shadowy beings of the Underworld known as Shadoles. Fa'Diel is also the home of a host of anthropomorphic animals and objects, as well as monsters from other Mana titles such as Rabites, Chobin Hoods, and Goblins. The player controls the protagonist of the game, who is either a male or female silent protagonist. The character is unnamed and no information is given about their past; their history and personality is meant to be determined by the player.

=== Characters and story branches ===
Rather than a single, overarching plot, the story of Legend of Mana is composed of a multitude of quests split into three main quest arcs, numerous other quests, and a final quest arc. Each main quest arc contains optional side-quests in addition to the main quests. Whenever the player completes the required portions of one of the quest arcs they are allowed to begin the final arc and finish the game, even if the other arcs have not yet been started or completed. The three main quest arcs prior to the final arc are: the Jumi arc, the Larc and Sierra arc, and the Matilda and Irwin arc.

The first main arc is the story of the Jumi, a dying race of people who have external jewel hearts which are considered valuable. The Jumi have long been a persecuted people, and many magic characters in this game refer to them as "dirt" as a pejorative on their jewel cores. This branch focuses on Elazul and Pearl, who are among the few survivors of the Jumi. Elazul is a Jumi Knight, and the mission of his life is to protect the Jumi Guardian Pearl at any cost, even in the face of the jewel hunter, Sandra. The player assists them in helping the Jumi.

The second arc is the story of Larc and Sierra—brother and sister dragoons who serve different dragon masters and fight on opposite sides of the same war for power. Larc serves the dragon Drakonis, who wants to kill the other three dragons so that he can rule the world. Larc blackmails the game's protagonist to help him in this quest. Sierra, a dragoon for Vadise the White Dragon, wants to stop Drakonis without hurting her brother Larc. In the end, Drakonis is defeated again and banished to the underworld, and Larc is freed from Drakonis' rule.

The third arc is the complicated love story of four childhood friends: Matilda, Irwin, Daena and Escad. Irwin is a half-demon who is angry that society prevents him from a relationship with the holy leader Matilda, and seeks to destroy the world in retribution. Escad seeks to destroy Irwin, and Daena tries to act as a mediator between all parties while keeping Matilda away from Irwin. The conflict eventually escalates into a war between humans and faeries. Depending on the choices of the player, either Daena or Escad will die, while the player helps bring an end to the conflict.

Regardless of which path(s) the hero decides to take, they begin the game's final story, titled "Legend of Mana". This arc concerns the re-appearance of the Mana Tree. The player journeys to the Mana Tree and scales it, but upon reaching the top they find that the Mana Goddess has become corrupted and the tree is rotten. The player is forced to fight the Mana Goddess, and after winning a Sproutling plants itself in the Mana Tree's rotten trunk. Calling upon the other Sproutlings to join them, they restore the Mana Tree.

== Development and release ==
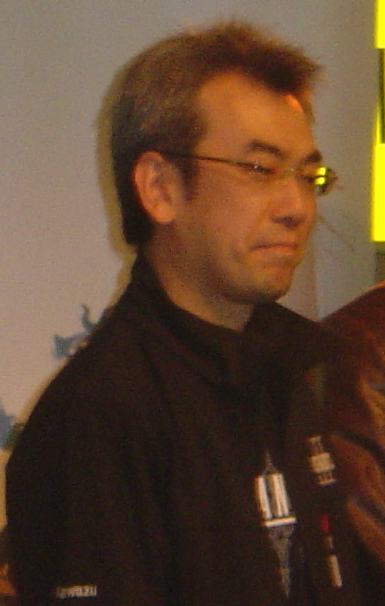
Producer Akitoshi Kawazu

Legend of Mana was directed by Mana series creator Koichi Ishii, who had worked on the three previous games in the series. Many of the other developers were new to the series, including producer Akitoshi Kawazu, the director and producer of many games in Square's SaGa series, and designer Akihiko Matsui, who had been the director for Chrono Trigger. The game's character designs and illustrations were done by Shinichi Kameoka. Retro Gamer, in 2011, stated that although Ishii kept the game tied to previous titles in the series by reusing gameplay elements, Kawazu had a heavy influence on the gameplay design of the game.

Legend of Mana was designed as a 2D game, despite the PlayStation's 3D-focus, as the console could not handle the full 3D world Ishii envisioned where one could interact with natural shaped objects. Kawazu initially let Ishii have a relaxed schedule and budget, as Ishii had a great number of ideas he wanted in the game, but when the project began to get out of control and out of time Kawazu tightened down the rest of the development schedule and convinced the Square executives to delay the game by two months—even though it had already been announced to the public—to allow it to be completed as Ishii envisioned. Content such as numerous character sprites and item game mechanics had to be scrapped for the sake of fitting the whole game on one CD-ROM. Kawazu has said that this experience taught him that his true skill in game development lay in working as a producer.

Legend of Mana was first announced by Square in March 1999 just before its debut at the Tokyo Game Show. The game was released in Japan in July 1999 with considerable hype, packaged with demos of Square's future releases Vagrant Story, Chrono Cross, Front Mission 3, and Threads of Fate. It was planned to be released in North America alongside the July and August 2000 releases of Chrono Cross and Threads of Fate, but was instead released early on June 6.

=== Music ===
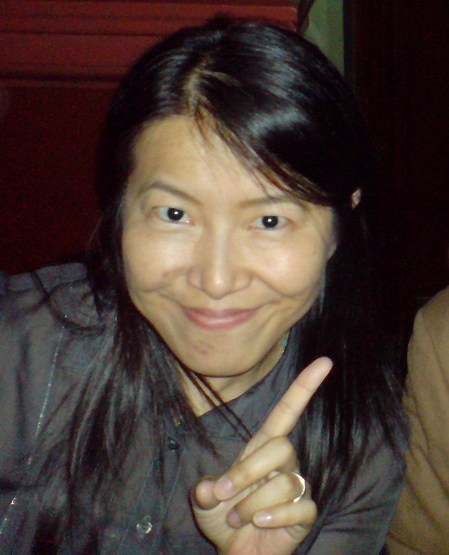
Composer Yoko Shimomura

Seiken Densetsu / Legend of Mana Original Soundtrack

Soundtrack album by Yoko Shimomura
- Released: July 23, 1999; October 20, 2004 (reprint)
- Genre: Video game soundtrack
- Length: 2:10:37
- Labels: DigiCube; Square Enix (reprint)

The original score for Legend of Mana was composed, arranged, and produced by Yoko Shimomura. Shimomura was a newcomer to the series; the previous two Mana games were scored by Hiroki Kikuta, and the first by Kenji Ito. Shimomura said in 2002 that she considered the soundtrack to Legend of Mana to be the one that best expresses herself. She claims that she prefers "passionate music that comes from the heart", and that she has to "feel the emotions of a piece in the extreme before I am able to write" the music by putting herself in the same mood as the piece is supposed to be in. Legend of Mana featured the first vocal track of any Mana game, "Song of Mana", which also serves as the game's opening theme. It was sung by Swedish vocalist Annika Ljungberg, who was chosen by Shimomura because she "wanted to stay away from working with someone popular that everyone already knows". After hearing a sample of Ljungberg's music, she flew to Sweden "straight away" to do an analog recording of the song.

The 1999 soundtrack album Seiken Densetsu / Legend of Mana Original Soundtrack collects 55 tracks of music from Legend of Mana on two discs. The music covers many styles including piano, hard rock, and electronic music. The soundtrack was published by DigiCube, and was reprinted by Square Enix in 2004. The album reached #65 on the Japanese Oricon music charts and stayed on the charts for two weeks. "Song of Mana" was later made available on the Square Vocal Collection album in 2001. Four of the game's tracks were released as part of Drammatica: The Very Best Works of Yoko Shimomura, an album of arrangements highlighting the composer's work.

=== Merchandise ===
Upon the game's Japanese release, several promotional items were made available from Square, including stuffed toy dolls of the rabite enemy and mascot of the series, a necklace, and lighters. As a promotion for Square's "Summer of Adventure" release schedule in 2000, which the North American release of the game was a part of, those who preordered the game were given a free music CD with select tracks from the game. Legend of Mana was re-released in Japan late in 2000 as part of the Square Millennium Collection at a budget price along with a special music box and two character figurines. A companion book titled Seiken Densetsu: Legend of Mana Ultimania including artwork and interviews was released as part of Square's Ultimania series. It was published by DigiCube in 1999 and later reprinted by Square Enix in 2004 after the subsidiary's closing. An artbook, Legend of Mana: Making of Mana, was published in 2000 by ASCII. A five-volume manga series, created by Shiro Amano, was published between 2000 and 2002.

== Reception ==
Reception

Aggregate scores
| Aggregator | Score |
|---|---|
| GameRankings | PS: 73% (23 reviews) |
| Metacritic | NS: 71/100 (25 reviews); PC: 71/100 (5 reviews); PS4: 72/100 (35 reviews) |

Review scores
| Publication | Score |
|---|---|
| Famitsu | 31/40 |
| GamePro | 4/5 |
| GameSpot | 7/10 |
| IGN | 8.3/10 |
| Next Generation | 2/5 |
| RPGamer | 4/5 |
| TouchArcade | 5/5 |

In Japan, Legend of Mana was a bestseller at the time of release, and sold over 400,000 units in its first week alone as the highest-selling release that week in Japan. By the end of the year, it had sold over 700,000 copies in Japan. Legend of Mana was also the top selling PlayStation game during the week of its release in North America.

Legend of Mana received mixed reviews from critics. The game's presentation was almost universally praised, especially its use of vibrant and colorful hand-drawn graphics. David Smith of IGN claimed that the graphics were one of the game's best points, and RPGamer's Andrew P. Bilyk noted that the visuals "may be the most impressive two-dimensional graphics ever to grace an RPG". Andrew Pfister of Electronic Gaming Monthly praised them even more, calling them "the most impressive 2D artwork ever seen on a console". Damian Thomas's RPGFan review likened the graphics to Disney animation for having "a very storybook, cutesy cartoony feel to them", while Andrew Vestal of GameSpot said that the graphics were some of the most lush and ornate 2D graphics ever made. The game won an award for best graphics at the 4th Japan Game Awards from the Computer Entertainment Supplier's Association. The music in Legend of Mana was also a high point in many reviews; the reviewers for Electronic Gaming Monthly called it "fantastic" and "wonderful". Smith of IGN's review stated that the soundtrack is "as good as any you'll hear today" with a good mix of intensity, suspense, and subtle nuance, and Vestal of GameSpot termed it "excellently orchestrated" and a perfect fit for the game in each environment.

Much of the game's criticism stemmed from its substitution of mostly unrelated quests over a main storyline. GamePro, while praising the Land Make system, found that the "focus of Legend of Mana is obscured by the over-abundance of subplots". Similarly, Game Revolution's Johnny Liu commented that the game lacked depth and felt like a collection of short quests rather than a single game, while Vestal of GameSpot noted that the game's use of miniquests will likely disappoint those seeking an action-RPG classic, and said that, although fun, the gameplay had a "schizophrenic and disjointed nature". Next Generation agreed, saying that the Land Make system was an "innovative feature" but that it left the game disjointed without a solid plot to keep everything together. The Japanese Weekly Famitsu reviewers felt that the system was ambitious, but left the game feeling disconnected, and that the divided plotlines kept the beginning of the game from having the charm of the end.

Gary Steinman of Official U.S. PlayStation Magazine said that the lack of a plotline gave the player no incentive to keep playing through what he felt was a poor combat system. Both of those criticisms were repeated by Electronic Gaming Monthly's Sam Kennedy in his review. RPGamer's Bilyk felt that the smaller plots, while sometimes simplistic and not focused on the player, were enjoyable experiences. IGN's Smith concluded that while he enjoyed the game, he felt that it was not a complete game like Secret of Mana, but instead a collection of fun experiences.

=== Legacy ===
In November 2000, Legend of Mana was ranked number 48 on Weekly Famitsu's list of top 100 PlayStation games of all time. The game was re-released on February 21, 2002, as part of the PSone Books best-sellers series in Japan, in 2006 as part of Square Enix's Ultimate Hits collection, and re-released on the PlayStation 3 PlayStation Network store as part of the PSone Classics series on March 22, 2011. A remastered version was released on June 24, 2021, for the Nintendo Switch, PlayStation 4, and PC. This version of the game was later released for Android and iOS on December 7, 2021, and on September 26, 2024, for Xbox Series X|S. An anime adaptation by Yokohama Animation Laboratory and Graphinica titled Legend of Mana: The Teardrop Crystal aired from October to December 2022. The series premiered in October 2022.
