= Sword of the Demon Hunter: Kijin Gentōshō =

Japanese novel series

- First novel volume cover

鬼人幻燈抄 (Kijin Gentōshō)
- Genre: Action; Historical fantasy; Supernatural
- Novel series
- Written by: Moto'o Nakanishi
- Published by: Arcadia (2013–2016); Shōsetsuka ni Narō (2015–2016)
- Original run: January 2013 – October 2016
- Novel series
- Written by: Moto'o Nakanishi
- Illustrated by: Tamaki
- Published by: Futabasha
- English publisher: NA: Seven Seas Entertainment
- Original run: June 21, 2019 – November 22, 2023
- Volumes: 14
- Manga
- Written by: Moto'o Nakanishi
- Illustrated by: Yū Satomi
- Published by: Futabasha
- English publisher: NA: Seven Seas Entertainment
- Imprint: Action Comics
- Magazine: Monthly Action; Manga Action
- Original run: September 9, 2021 – present
- Volumes: 10
- Anime television series
- Directed by: Kazuya Aiura
- Produced by: Hiroyuki Aoi; Akane Taketsugu; Taisuke Hashirayama; Gou Morita; Yuki Ogasawara; Fuuma Murakami; Tomomi Asai; Hirotaka Kaneko
- Written by: Deko Akao
- Music by: Ryuuichi Takada; Keiichi Hirokawa; Kuniyuki Takahashi
- Studio: Yokohama Animation Laboratory
- Licensed by: Sentai Filmworks: SA/SEA: Medialink
- Original network: Tokyo MX, MBS, BS Fuji
- Original run: March 31, 2025 – September 29, 2025
- Episodes: 24
- icon

Sword of the Demon Hunter: Kijin Gentōshō (Japanese: 鬼人幻燈抄, Hepburn: Kijin Gentōshō) is a Japanese historical fantasy novel series written by Moto'o Nakanishi and illustrated by Tamaki. It was serialized online between January 2013 and May 2016 on the user-generated novel publishing website Arcadia, and it later moved to the Shōsetsuka ni Narō website, where it was serialized between December 2015 and October 2016. It was later acquired by Futabasha, who have published fourteen volumes from June 2019 to November 2023. A manga adaptation with art by Yū Satomi is published by Futabasha since September 2021 and has been collected in ten tankōbon volumes. Both the original novel series and manga adaptation are licensed in English by Seven Seas Entertainment. An anime television series adaptation produced by Yokohama Animation Laboratory aired from March to September 2025.

== Plot ==
In the Edo period, within the secluded mountain village of Kadono, resided Jinta, a young man who served as the guardian to the shrine maiden known as Itsukihime. Originally an outsider, Jinta and his younger sister, Suzune, had sought refuge in the village after fleeing their previous home. Embracing his role, Jinta dedicated himself to protecting the villagers from various perils. One fateful day, he was tasked with confronting a mysterious demon lurking in the forest. Upon encountering the creature, Jinta experienced a supernatural event that profoundly altered his existence. This pivotal moment marked the beginning of his extraordinary journey across different eras, where he faced demons, deities, and individuals bound by enigmatic destinies. Throughout his odyssey, Jinta gradually uncovered a deeper connection to the supernatural realm, leading to revelations about his own existence.

== Characters ==
Jinta (甚太) / Jinya (甚夜)
Voiced by: Taku Yashiro (Japanese); Aaron Campbell, Chaney Moore (young) (English)
The main protagonist, and the older brother of Suzune. He and Suzune escaped their father's mistreatment, were adopted by Motoharu and grew up with his daughter Shirayuki. He was trained in the art of combat by Motoharu and became one of the protectors of Kadono village and a guardian to Shirayuki, the village's priestess. The two developed feelings for each other but agreed to put their feelings aside for their duty.
Jinya encounters Dōga no Oni during a mission and defeats him, with the former giving him his demon powers and warning him of the future to come. As he returns to the village, he finds that Suzune had killed Shirayuki and set the village ablaze. Disgusted by her actions he tries to kill her, but fails, thus prompting his mission to destroy Suzune as the prophesied leader of all Demons.
As a result of his demon powers, Jinya effectively became a demon with superior physical abilities, a prolonged lifespan, and the ability to absorb the powers of other Demons.
Suzune (鈴音)
Voiced by: Reina Ueda (Japanese); Juliet Simmons (English)
The younger sister of Jinya. Suzune was born as a result of her mother's rape by a Demon, causing her father to mistreat her, thus prompting the siblings escape until being taken into the Kadono village. She remained in a child form despite the passing of the years as she suppressed her feelings for Jinya, to allow him to be with Shirayuki.
Upon learning from Tōmi no Kijo that Shirayuki was marrying Kiyomasa, Suzune flew into a morbid frenzy believing Shirayuki betrayed Jinya, thus causing her to grow to adult size and develop demonic powers, killing Shirayuki and setting the village ablaze. Disgusted by her actions Jinya rejects her, causing Suzune to hate humanity. Suzune is the series' main antagonist and the prophesied Kishin, the leader of all Demons that will subjugate humanity to bring a future for the Demons.
Shirayuki (白雪)
Voiced by: Saori Hayami (Japanese); Shanae'a Moore (English)
Jinya's love interest whom he met during their childhood upon living in Kadono village with the two growing closer over the years. She eventually succeeded her mother as the village's priestess (Itsukihime) with Jinya as her guardian. Although the two have feelings for one another they agreed to leave them aside for their duties and thus chose to marry with Kiyomasa. She was killed by a frenzied Suzune who misunderstood her actions believing she was betraying Jinya. Her murder causes Jinya to hunt Suzune.
Dōga no Oni (同化の鬼)
Voiced by: Hiroshi Shirokuma (Japanese); Cyrus Rodas (English)
A Demon and the companion of Tōmi no Kijo. He faced Jinya in order to carry on with Tōmi no Kijo's plan to awaken Suzune as their leader. He is defeated by Jinya and grants him his powers, turning Jinya into a Demon.
Tōmi no Kijo (遠見の鬼女)
Voiced by: Yui Kondo (Japanese); Molly Searcy (English)
A Demon and the companion of Dōga no Oni. Having the ability to foresee the future, she knew that Demons would disappear with the passage of time and the evolution of the ages. To prevent the doom of the demonkin she manipulated Suzune in order to awaken her demonic side by revealing Shirayuki was marrying Kiyomasa. This caused Suzune to become enraged, kill Shirayuki and turn her into the Kishin, the prophecied leader of all Demons. Tōmi no Kijo was killed shielding Suzune from Jinya, allowing the former to escape, dying satisfied with her purpose fulfilled.
Kiyomasa (清正)
Voiced by: Kentarō Kumagai (Japanese); Jeremy Gee (English)
A fellow guardian along with Jinya, he held a rivalry with Jinya both as a guardian and for Shirayuki's affections. He was set up in a political marriage with Shirayuki despite knowing she didn't love him. He was killed along with Shirayuki during the attack on the village.
Chitose (ちとせ)
Voiced by: Haruka Shamoto (Japanese); Kristen McGuire (English)
A childhood friend of Jinya, Shirayuki and Suzune. When she re-encountered Jinya decades later (1872, Meiji Year 5) in Kyoto, it was revealed that after the death of Shirayuki, she took over the role of Itsukihime and was renamed Chiyo. She got married and together with her husband, were running the Kyoto branch of the original shrine in Kadono. The role of Itsukihime was passed on to her daughter.
Natsu (奈津)
Voiced by: Saya Aizawa
Natsu is the adopted daughter of Jūzō, who becomes acquainted with Jinya during a request to kill a Demon that was hunting her. Natsu grows to hate and distances herself from Jinya when he was forced to kill their father, now turned into a Demon by a drink enchanted by Suzune. However, it is revealed she has regretted hurting Jinya many years ago when she crosses paths with him one final time.
Zenji (善二)
Voiced by: Hiromu Mineta
Zenji is Jūzō's right-hand man and the caretaker of Natsu.
Jūzō (重蔵)
Voiced by: Masaki Aizawa (Japanese); John Gremillion (English)
Jūzō is Jinya and Suzune's father who adopted Natsu in the years after their escape. Jūzō is now a successful businessman and a reformed man who has tasked Jinya with missions to take down Demons, with the two recognizing each other, but preferring to keep their relationship formal. Jūzō was killed by Jinya after turning into a Demon by Suzune.
Kihei Restaurant Owner (喜兵衛の店主, Kihei no Tenshu)
Voiced by: Yōji Ueda
The adoptive father of Ofū who owns a Soba restaurant that Jinya frequently visits. In truth he's a Samurai from a prestigious household who became older as a result of Ofū's powers, but with being unable to be recognized in his current state, he sold the riches in his possession and opened his store. He's the older brother of Miura and serves as a voice of wisdom for Jinya and his many companions.
Ofū (おふう)
Voiced by: Ai Kayano
The adoptive daughter of the Restaurant Owner, she is a Demon born from children killed in war. She's a benevolent Demon but has the ability to trap people in a dream-like dimension where the passage of time is much faster. She inadvertently caused her father to age 20 years when he stayed with her in order to comfort her. Ofū becomes one of Jinya's closest friends across the ages.
Naotsugu Miura (三浦直次, Miura Naotsugu)
Voiced by: Seiichiro Yamashita
A Samurai from a prestigious family, he meets Jinya while trying to investigate his brother's mysterious disappearance. Although he regularly meets Jinya in the soba restaurant, he never learns that the owner is his brother. Miura becomes one of Jinya's steadfast allies in the Edo period. He's both skilled with the sword and a noble warrior who fights to keep the people safe, eventually taking the side of the Emperor during the Boshin War.
Yotaka (夜鷹)
Voiced by: Hitomi Nabatame
A prostitute whom Jinya meets regularly as she serves as both a client for Jinya's demon hunts and a source of information. She eventually marries Miura after he defends her from a demon chasing her.
Somegorō Akitsu (秋津染吾郎, Akitsu Somegorō)
Voiced by: Kōji Yusa
A travelling merchant and an exorcist who specializes in hunting Demons using mystical objects and sorcery. He meets with Jinya and serves as something of an uneasy ally as the two have helped each other, but remain wary of one another. Somegorō Akitsu is not his real name, but rather an alias he adopted from a long line of similar exorcists.
Yasuhide Hatakeyama (畠山泰秀, Hatakeyama Yasuhide)
Voiced by: Toshihiko Seki
The main antagonist of the Edo period. Yasuhide is a steadfast pro-Shogunate Daimyo who is less than pleased about the influence of foreign powers in Japan, whom he believes will erode Japanese traditions, culture and power and seeks to expel the foreigners. For this reason, he allies himself with both human and demons, not discriminating on the latter. Yasuhide meets and tries to convince Jinya to join his side but fails as he's resolute on his mission.
A very scheming and calculating man, Yasuhide carries several plots involving Jinya and his own demon enforcers. Jinya eventually becomes disgusted with his methods after Tsuchiura attempted to kill Miura on his orders.
Tsuchiura (土浦)
Voiced by: Kenichirou Matsuda
Yasuhide's right-hand man. He's a hulking man with demon powers, becoming a greatly muscular ogre with the ability to harden his body. He's unflinchingly loyal to Yasuhide, who favors him despite his demonic powers.
Kiichi Okada (岡田貴一, Okada Kiichi)
Voiced by: Kazuya Nakai
One of Yasuhide's main demon enforcers. Unlike Tsurauchi he's a lesser demon so he has not developed unique powers. However, he is still a considerable threat due to his terrifying skill in swordsmanship, being able to defeat Jinya with his skill alone. Okada's philosophy about using a blade for killing and the thrill of battle affect Jinya himself. Okada becomes one of Jinya's long friends across the years, becoming a store manager in modern times.

== Media ==
=== Novels ===
No.	Original release date	Original ISBN	English release date	English ISBN
1	June 21, 2019	978-4-575-24185-3	December 6, 2022	978-1-68579-332-6
2	October 18, 2019	978-4-575-24216-4	July 25, 2023	978-1-68579-634-1
3	February 21, 2020	978-4-575-24253-9	November 28, 2023	978-1-68579-660-0
4	June 19, 2020	978-4-575-24290-4	February 6, 2024	979-8-88843-063-7
5	October 23, 2020	978-4-575-24339-0	May 14, 2024	979-8-88843-438-3
6	February 19, 2021	978-4-575-24377-2	August 27, 2024	979-8-89160-072-0
7	June 18, 2021	978-4-575-24417-5	November 26, 2024	979-8-89160-282-3
8	October 21, 2021	978-4-575-24457-1	February 18, 2025	979-8-89160-749-1
9	February 26, 2022	978-4-575-24492-2	May 20, 2025	979-8-89160-965-5
10	June 22, 2022	978-4-575-24534-9	August 19, 2025	979-8-89373-739-4
11	October 20, 2022	978-4-575-24574-5	November 4, 2025	979-8-89373-740-0
12	February 22, 2023	978-4-575-24607-0	February 24, 2026	979-8-89373-741-7
13	July 26, 2023	978-4-575-24640-7	May 26, 2026	979-8-89373-742-4
14	November 22, 2023	978-4-575-24697-1	August 25, 2026	979-8-89561-404-4

=== Manga ===
No.	Original release date	Original ISBN	English release date	English ISBN
1	September 9, 2021	978-4-575-44004-1	January 24, 2023	978-1-68579-333-3
2	March 10, 2022	978-4-575-44015-7	May 2, 2023	978-1-68579-515-3
3	September 8, 2022	978-4-575-44024-9	October 3, 2023	979-8-88843-021-7
4	March 15, 2023	978-4-575-44034-8	March 19, 2024	979-8-88843-384-3
5	September 13, 2023	978-4-575-44041-6	September 3, 2024	979-8-89160-198-7
6	February 29, 2024	978-4-575-44047-8	January 28, 2025	979-8-89160-661-6
7	September 11, 2024	978-4-575-44060-7	September 9, 2025	979-8-89373-329-7
8	March 19, 2025	978-4-575-44077-5	January 6, 2026	979-8-89561-717-5
9	September 10, 2025	978-4-575-44098-0	July 7, 2026	979-8-89765-363-8
10	March 11, 2026	978-4-575-44111-6	—	—
11	September 9, 2026	978-4-575-44129-1	—	—

=== Anime ===
An anime adaptation was announced by Futabasha on September 9, 2021. It was later revealed to be a television series produced by Yokohama Animation Laboratory and directed by Kazuya Aiura, with Deko Akao overseeing series scripts, Taro Ikegami designing the characters and Ryuuichi Takada, Keiichi Hirokawa, and Kuniyuki Takahashi composing the music. The series was originally scheduled to premiere on June 27, 2024, but was later delayed due to production delays, which eventually aired from March 31 to September 29, 2025, on Tokyo MX and other networks, and ran for two consecutive cours. (Note: From Episode 2 onward, Tokyo MX listed the series airing at 24:00, which is effectively midnight JST.) From episodes 1–13, the opening theme song is "Continue", performed by NEE, while the ending theme song is "Senya Ichiya" (千夜一夜; One Thousand and One Nights), performed by Hilcrhyme feat. Izumi Nakasone from HY. From episodes 14–24, the second opening theme song is "Ash", performed by Alexandros while the ending theme song is "Enrin" (Round Bell), performed by FAKE TYPE.

Sentai Filmworks licensed the series in North America for streaming on Hidive. Medialink licensed the series in South, Southeast Asia and Oceania (except Australia and New Zealand) for streaming on the Ani-One Asia YouTube channel.

==== Episodes ====
No.	Title	Directed by (Note: Production staff information is taken from the ending credits of each episode.)	Written by	Storyboarded by	Original release date
1	"Demons and Humans"; Transliteration: "Oni to Hito to" (Japanese: 鬼と人と)	Nekomataya	Deko Akao	Kazuya Aiura	March 31, 2025
2	"The Demon's Daughter"; Transliteration: "Oni no Musume" (Japanese: 鬼の娘)	Honami Inamura	Deko Akao	Shinji Itadaki	April 8, 2025
3	"The Devourer Part 1"; Transliteration: "Musabori Kuu Mono (Zenpen)" (Japanese: 貪り喰うもの(前編))	Hazuki Satō, Honami Inamura	Daishiro Tanimura	Ryohei Miyazawa	April 15, 2025
4	"The Devourer Part 2"; Transliteration: "Musabori Kuu Mono (Kōhen)" (Japanese: 貪り喰うもの(後編))	Hazuki Satō	Daishiro Tanimura	Ichizō Kobayashi	April 22, 2025
5	"The Garden of Happiness Part 1"; Transliteration: "Kōfuku no Niwa Zenpen" (Japanese: 幸福の庭・前編)	Honami Inamura	Deko Akao	Ichizō Kobayashi	April 29, 2025
6	"The Garden of Happiness Part 2"; Transliteration: "Kōfuku no Niwa Kōhen" (Japanese: 幸福の庭・後編)	Rika Masuko	Deko Akao	Ichizō Kobayashi	May 6, 2025
7	"The Cursed Night of Kudanzaka"; Transliteration: "Kudan-zaka Noroi Yoi" (Japanese: 九段坂呪い宵)	Shinji Arai	Saji Komori	Yuki Ogawa	May 13, 2025
8	"The Night Flower Hairpin Part 1"; Transliteration: "Hanayoi Kanzashi (Zenpen)" (Japanese: 花宵簪(前編))	Sumika Takase	Deko Akao	Ichizō Kobayashi	May 20, 2025
9	"The Night Flower Hairpin Part 2"; Transliteration: "Hanayoi Kanzashi (Kōhen)" (Japanese: 花宵簪(後編))	Shinya Kawabe	Deko Akao	Minoru Ohara	May 27, 2025
10	"The Harlot in the Rain"; Transliteration: "Ame Yotaka" (Japanese: 雨夜鷹)	Rika Masuko	Daishiro Tanimura	Kazuya Murata	June 3, 2025
11	"Drunken Dreams of Snowy Remains Part 1"; Transliteration: "Zansetsu Suimu (Zenpen)" (Japanese: 残雪酔夢(前編))	Hazuki Satō	Daishiro Tanimura	Ichizō Kobayashi	June 10, 2025
12	"Drunken Dreams of Snowy Remains Part 2"; Transliteration: "Zansetsu Suimu (Chuuhen)" (Japanese: 残雪酔夢(中編))	Honami Inamura	Daishiro Tanimura	Ichizō Kobayashi	June 17, 2025
13	"Drunken Dreams of Snowy Remains Part 3"; Transliteration: "Zansetsu Suimu (Kōhen)" (Japanese: 残雪酔夢(後編))	Hazuki Satō	Daishiro Tanimura	Yuki Ogawa	June 24, 2025
14	"The Embodiment of Jealousy"; Transliteration: "Toshin no Utsusemi" (Japanese: 妬心の現身)	Ryōhei Endo	Daishiro Tanimura	Ryōji Fujiwara	July 15, 2025
15	"Night Tale of the Cursed Sword ~Flying Blade~"; Transliteration: "Yōtō Yawa ~Hijin~" (Japanese: 妖刀夜話～飛刃～)	Kento Suzuki	Deko Akao	Ichizō Kobayashi	July 22, 2025
16	"The Logic of an Amanojaku"; Transliteration: "Amanojaku no Ri" (Japanese: 天邪鬼の理)	Ryō Kawada	Saji Komori	Ryō Kawada	July 29, 2025
17	"To Live by the Sword"; Transliteration: "Ken ni Itaru" (Japanese: 剣に至る)	Hazuki Satō	Saji Komori	Kazuya Murata	August 5, 2025
18	"The Teatime Conversation"; Transliteration: "Chanomibanashi" (Japanese: 茶飲み話)	Kento Suzuki	Deko Akao	Kazuya Aiura	August 12, 2025
19	"Flux"; Transliteration: "Ruten" (Japanese: 流転)	Shinpei Ezaki	Saji Komori	Shinpei Ezaki	August 19, 2025
20	"The Wish Part 1"; Transliteration: "Negai (Zenpen)" (Japanese: 願い(前編))	Kento Suzuki	Saji Komori	Ryōji Fujiwara	August 26, 2025
21	"The Wish Part 2"; Transliteration: "Negai (Kōhen)" (Japanese: 願い(後編))	Honami Inamura, Hazuki Satō	Saji Komori	Toshiya Niidome	September 2, 2025
22	"The Twin Shizukas"; Transliteration: "Futari Shizuka" (Japanese: 二人静)	Koichi Itō	Deko Akao	Toshiya Niidome	September 9, 2025
23	"The Candy Apple Celestial Maiden Part 1"; Transliteration: "Ringo Ame Tennyo Chāo (Zenpen)" (Japanese: 林檎飴天女抄(前編))	Ryō Kawada	Deko Akao	Toshiya Niidome	September 22, 2025
24	"The Candy Apple Celestial Maiden Part 2"; Transliteration: "Ringo Ame Tennyo Chāo (Kōhen)" (Japanese: 林檎飴天女抄(後編))	Ryō Kawada	Deko Akao	Kazuya Aiura	September 29, 2025

== Reception ==
The novel series has over 230,000 copies in circulation.
