= Fungus and Iron =

Japanese manga series

- First tankōbon volume cover

菌と鉄 (Kin to Tetsu)
- Genre: Adventure; Dark fantasy; Science fiction
- Manga
- Written by: Ayaka Katayama
- Published by: Kodansha
- English publisher: NA: Kodansha USA
- Magazine: Bessatsu Shōnen Magazine
- Original run: March 9, 2021 – September 9, 2026
- Volumes: 10
- Anime television series
- Directed by: Keitaro Motonaga
- Studio: Yokohama Animation Laboratory
- icon

Fungus and Iron (Japanese: 菌と鉄, Hepburn: Kin to Tetsu) is a Japanese manga series written and illustrated by Ayaka Katayama. It was serialized in Bessatsu Shōnen Magazine from March 2021 to September 2026, with its individual chapters collected into ten volumes. An anime television series adaptation produced by Yokohama Animation Laboratory has been announced.

== Plot ==
Set in a world where humanity has been ruled by fungi and all freedoms have been taken away by the Amigasa government, Dante, a soldier, lives in Area D-18, which is controlled by the government. One day, Dante is assigned to a top-secret mission that forces him to travel outside of Area D-18. While on the mission, he meets a woman named Aoi. After talking with her, he begins to distrust the government and joins a rebel organization to stand up against it.

== Media ==
=== Manga ===
Written and illustrated by Ayaka Katayama, the series began serialization in Kodansha's Bessatsu Shōnen Magazine on March 9, 2021. In August 2021, the series went on hiatus due to Katayama going on maternity leave; the series resumed serialization in March 2022. It ended serialization on September 9, 2026. Its individual chapters were collected into ten tankōbon volumes released from July 9, 2021, to October 8, 2026.

In January 2022, Kodansha USA announced that they licensed the series for English publication.

No.	Original release date	Original ISBN	English release date	English ISBN
1	July 9, 2021	978-4-06-523583-6	February 8, 2022	978-1-63-699604-2
2	June 9, 2022	978-4-06-528162-8	February 14, 2023	978-1-68-491568-2
3	November 9, 2022	978-4-06-529645-5	May 9, 2023	978-1-68-491932-1
4	June 8, 2023	978-4-06-531870-6	October 24, 2023	979-8-88-933196-4
5	January 9, 2024	978-4-06-534164-3	June 11, 2024	979-8-88-933564-1
6	October 8, 2024	978-4-06-537048-3	February 25, 2025	979-8-89-478374-1
7	April 9, 2025	978-4-06-539037-5	September 23, 2025	979-8-89-478688-9
8	October 9, 2025	978-4-06-541095-0	February 24, 2026	979-8-89-478893-7
9	April 9, 2026	978-4-06-543303-4	—	—
10	October 8, 2026	978-4-06-545269-1	—	—

=== Anime ===
An anime television series adaptation was announced on March 4, 2026. It will be produced by Yokohama Animation Laboratory and directed by Keitaro Motonaga.

== Reception ==
Christopher Farris from Anime News Network offered praise for the setting-up of the story in the first volume, though felt the artwork was a bit amateurish in places. Kazuhiko Otoguro, an editor at Bessatsu Shōnen Magazine, picked the series as his favorite manga from 2021.
