= Starlight Promises =

2018 Japanese original net animation

- anime key visual

約束の七夜祭り (Yakusoku no Nanaya Matsuri)
- Original net animation
- Directed by: Kazuya Murata
- Produced by: Jonathan Kazushi Maeno
- Written by: Kazuya Murata
- Music by: Taro Iwashiro
- Studio: Yokohama Animation Laboratory
- Licensed by: Crunchyroll
- Released: August 3, 2018
- Runtime: 62 minutes

Starlight Promises (Japanese: 約束の七夜祭り, Hepburn: Yakusoku no Nanaya Matsuri, transl. "The Promised Seven Night Festival") is a Japanese original net animation film produced by XFlag and Yokohama Animation Laboratory. The net film was scheduled to launch on July 7, 2018, on YouTube, but was postponed to August 3, 2018, due to the 2018 Japan floods.

== Plot ==
The high school student Shoma Mihara surprisingly receives a message from Atsushi Fujii, a good friend from elementary school days, with whom he has lost contact via a mobile app. He is invited to a party and to finally meet Atsushi again, Shoma embarks on the path described. Suddenly he comes to a festival area hidden in the wilderness, where people from all over the world prepare a Tanabata festival in traditional clothing and according to old craftsmanship. The girl Shiori Senozawa, who is supposed to play the princess of the festival, leads him around. Shoma was chosen as her prince and he joins in the hope of meeting Atsushi.

When preparing for the festival, the participants will learn from their suits and augmented reality glasses that give them the strength and knowledge they need. Kanna, the girl who leads the preparations, is also artificial intelligence. At night, however, Shiori and Shoma are attacked by samurai, also produced by an AI, against which they have to defend themselves. Shoma also learns that everyone has come to the festival to meet someone who has died. When the festival begins, the two are attacked again and have to fight Kanna against the samurai. These are generated by the AI that prepared the festival because it had to process too much information and the samurai created from the knowledge of legends and history. Finally, during the ceremony, Shoma realizes that Atsushi did not move away either, but died. He had only repressed the memory of it. Shoma sees an AI-generated simulation of Atsushi and can say goodbye to him, just like all participants in the festival can see their deceased one last time. This was made possible by an app on their cell phones, which Shoma had also invited to the festival.

== Characters ==
Shoma Mihara (三波羅星真)
Voiced by: Sōma Saitō
Shiori Senozawa (瀬ノ沢志織)
Voiced by: Nozomi Yamamoto
Kanna (カンナ)
Voiced by: Tomomi Mineuchi
Atsushi Fujii (藤井敦史)
Voiced by: Daiki Yamashita
Kaori Senozawa (瀬ノ沢香織)
Voiced by: Sayaka Senbongi
Kogetsuhime (姫武者・湖月姫)
Voiced by: Ayaka Fukuhara

== Production and release ==
The net film was produced by XFlag and Yokohama Animation Laboratory. It was directed and written by Kazuya Murata, with Jonathan Kazushi Maeno producing the work. Taro Iwashiro composed the music, with Anri Kumaki performing the opening theme song "Awai".

The release of the 62-minute film in Japan was scheduled for July 7, 2018, the day of the 2018 Tanabata Festival via YouTube. However, the net film was delayed to August 3, 2018, due to the 2018 Japan floods. Crunchyroll holds the license to simulcast the anime with subtitles in various languages.
