= The Great Cleric =

Japanese light novel series

- Cover of the first light novel volume

聖者無双 (Seija Musō)
- Genre: Isekai, slice of life
- Novel series
- Written by: Broccoli Lion
- Published by: Shōsetsuka ni Narō
- Original run: October 17, 2015 – February 28, 2022
- Light novel
- Written by: Broccoli Lion
- Illustrated by: Sime
- Published by: Micro Magazine
- English publisher: NA: J-Novel Club
- Imprint: GC Novels
- Original run: August 30, 2016 – present
- Volumes: 11
- Manga
- Written by: Broccoli Lion
- Illustrated by: Hiiro Akikaze
- Published by: Kodansha
- English publisher: NA: Vertical
- Magazine: Suiyōbi no Sirius
- Original run: June 1, 2017 – present
- Volumes: 17
- Anime television series
- Directed by: Masato Tamagawa
- Written by: Keiichirō Ōchi
- Music by: Toshihiko Sahashi
- Studio: Yokohama Animation Laboratory; Cloud Hearts
- Licensed by: Crunchyroll (streaming); SA/SEA: Muse Communication
- Original network: TBS, BS11, AT-X, TVh, TBS Channel 1
- Original run: July 14, 2023 – September 29, 2023
- Episodes: 12
- icon

The Great Cleric (Japanese: 聖者無双, Hepburn: Seija Musō) is a Japanese light novel series written by Broccoli Lion. Originally published via the novel posting website Shōsetsuka ni Narō in October 2015, the series was later acquired by Micro Magazine, who began publishing the series in print with illustrations by Sime. A manga adaptation, illustrated by Hiiro Akikaze, began serialization on the Niconico-based web manga platform Suiyōbi no Sirius in June 2017. An anime television series adaptation by Yokohama Animation Laboratory and Cloud Hearts aired from July to September 2023.

== Plot ==
A young Japanese salaryman is killed by a gunshot and reincarnated by a deity in an alternate, fantasy-like world as Luciel, a teenager blessed with healing magic. To make sure that this time he lives a long and happy life, Luciel works hard to improve himself. As he rises in the ranks of the clergy, Luciel uses his powers to assist those in need, while helping restore the church's reputation, tarnished by the greed and corruption of many of its members, making friends and enemies along the way.

== Characters ==
Luciel (ルシエル, Rushieru)
Voiced by: Reiji Kawashima (Japanese); Justin Briner (English)
Brod (ブロド, Burodo)
Voiced by: Akio Otsuka
Gulgar (グルガー, Gurugā)
Voiced by: Tomoaki Maeno (Japanese); Nasim Benelkour (English)
Galba (ガルバ, Garuba)
Voiced by: Daisuke Ono (Japanese); Mauricio Ortiz-Segura (English)
Lumina (ルミナ, Rumina)
Voiced by: Rika Kinugawa (Japanese); Julie Cleburn (English)
Nanaella (ナナエラ, Nanaera)
Voiced by: Hina Tachibana (Japanese); Bryn Apprill (English)
Monika (モニカ)
Voiced by: Manaka Iwami (Japanese); Kiane Chula King (English)
Kururu (クルル)
Voiced by: Mikoi Sasaki (Japanese); Sarah Roach (English)
Master Monster Luck (豪運先生, Gōun-sensei)
Voiced by: Showtaro Morikubo (Japanese); Anthony Bowling (English)
Pope (教皇, Kyōkō)
Voiced by: Eriko Matsui
Cattleya (カトレア, Katorea)
Voiced by: Yoko Hikasa (Japanese); Jessica Peterson (English)
Granhart (グランハルト, Guranharuto)
Voiced by: Masaki Terasoma (Japanese); Aaron Roberts (English)
Geordo (ジョルド, Jorudo)
Voiced by: Kentarō Kumagai

== Media ==
=== Light novel ===
Written by Broccoli Lion, the series began publication on the novel posting website Shōsetsuka ni Narō on October 17, 2015. It was later acquired by Micro Magazine, who began publishing the series in print with illustrations by Sime on August 30, 2016. As of May 2024, eleven volumes have been released.

In October 2020, J-Novel Club announced that they licensed the novels for English publication.

==== Volume list ====
No.	Original release date	Original ISBN	English release date	English ISBN
1	August 30, 2016	978-4-89-637579-4	February 2, 2021	978-1-71-836202-4
2	January 28, 2017	978-4-89-637613-5	June 28, 2021	978-1-71-836204-8
3	June 30, 2017	978-4-89-637640-1	July 20, 2021	978-1-71-836206-2
4	February 28, 2018	978-4-89-637692-0	August 27, 2021	978-1-71-836208-6
5	October 30, 2018	978-4-89-637827-6	October 27, 2021	978-1-71-836210-9
6	June 29, 2019	978-4-89-637893-1	January 20, 2022	978-1-71-836212-3
7	December 26, 2019	978-4-89-637953-2	April 14, 2022	978-1-71-836214-7
8	November 30, 2020	978-4-86-716084-8	June 2, 2022	978-1-71-836216-1
9	July 30, 2021	978-4-86-716162-3	August 4, 2022	978-1-71-836218-5
10	January 28, 2022	978-4-86-716241-5	December 1, 2022	978-1-71-836220-8
11	May 30, 2024	978-4-86-716581-2	May 20, 2025	978-1-71-836222-2

=== Manga ===
A manga adaptation, illustrated by Hiiro Akikaze, began serialization on Kodansha's Niconico-based Suiyōbi no Sirius manga service on January 27, 2017. As of September 2026, the series' individual chapters have been collected into 17 tankōbon volumes.

At Anime Expo 2019, Vertical announced that they licensed the series for English publication.

==== Volume list ====
No.	Original release date	Original ISBN	English release date	English ISBN
1	June 30, 2017	978-4-06-390712-4	July 23, 2019 (digital); February 21, 2023 (print)	978-1-64-651763-3
2	February 28, 2018	978-4-06-510744-7	September 17, 2019 (digital); March 14, 2023 (print)	978-1-64-651764-0
3	October 30, 2018	978-4-06-513029-2	October 15, 2019 (digital); May 30, 2023 (print)	978-1-64-651765-7
4	July 9, 2019	978-4-06-516206-4	November 19, 2019 (digital); July 18, 2023 (print)	978-1-64-651766-4
5	February 7, 2020	978-4-06-518444-8	June 30, 2020 (digital); September 19, 2023 (print)	978-1-64-651767-1
6	August 6, 2020	978-4-06-520408-5	January 26, 2021 (digital); November 21, 2023 (print)	978-1-64-651768-8
7	February 9, 2021	978-4-06-522213-3	September 28, 2021 (digital); January 23, 2024 (print)	978-1-64-651769-5
8	August 6, 2021	978-4-06-524167-7	March 29, 2022 (digital); March 26, 2024 (print)	978-1-64-651813-5
9	February 9, 2022	978-4-06-526710-3	January 31, 2023 (digital); May 28, 2024 (print)	978-1-64-651814-2
10	October 7, 2022	978-4-06-528959-4	September 26, 2023 (digital); July 30, 2024 (print)	978-1-64-651952-1
11	March 9, 2023	978-4-06-530896-7	November 14, 2023 (digital); September 24, 2024 (print)	979-8-88-877068-9
12	July 7, 2023	978-4-06-532132-4	January 30, 2024 (digital); January 21, 2025 (print)	979-8-88-877153-2
13	March 8, 2024	978-4-06-534784-3	September 24, 2024 (digital)	979-8-89-478019-1
14	October 8, 2024	978-4-06-537399-6	May 20, 2025 (digital)	979-8-89-478523-3
15	July 9, 2025	978-4-06-539932-3	December 23, 2025 (digital)	979-8-89-478808-1
16	February 9, 2026	978-4-06-542380-6	—	—
17	September 9, 2026	978-4-06-544773-4	—	—

=== Anime ===
An anime television series adaptation was announced on October 7, 2022. It is produced by Yokohama Animation Laboratory and Cloud Hearts, and directed by Masato Tamagawa, with scripts supervised by Keiichirō Ōchi, character designs handled by Guonian Wang, and music composed by Toshihiko Sahashi. The series aired from July 14 to September 29, 2023, on TBS and other networks. The opening theme song is "Bagu-chan" (バグちゃん) by Nasuo☆, while the ending theme song is "A New Day" by Yuki Nakashima. Crunchyroll streamed the series. Muse Communication licensed the series in Asia-Pacific.

==== Episode list ====
No.	Title (Note: All English titles are taken from Crunchyroll.)	Directed by (Note: Information is taken from the ending credits of each episode.)	Written by	Storyboarded by	Original release date (Note: Episodes are released on select platforms a week before their air dates on television.)
1	"The Healers' Guild"; Transliteration: "Chiyushi Girudo" (Japanese: 治癒士ギルド)	Masato Tamagawa	Keiichirō Ōchi	Masato Tamagawa	July 14, 2023
A Japanese salaryman is shot and dies but is reincarnated by God to an alternate world as 15 year old Luciel with the magic skills of Martial Arts, Master Luck and Holy Healing. Having accepted his new circumstances he heads to nearby Maritoni city and presents himself as a trainee healer. He learns Healers get special benefits due to their skills, but learns from adventurer Bazan most citizens hold them in contempt since the entire Healers Guild is corrupt and either charge extortionate prices for healing or simply let people who can't pay die of their injuries. Sensing his potential, Captain Lumina of the Holy Paladins helps get him membership at the guild with secretaries Karuru and Monika. To learn healer skills Lucien opts for Spartan training; studying and casting spells repeatedly until his mastery levels improve, a difficult method with the benefit of being free as he doesn't have to pay a guild school for tutoring. He decides to make money at the adventurers guild where injuries are common and encounters Bazan again, just as an adventurer party arrives all severely wounded. Luciel immediately offers his help.
2	"The Adventurers' Guild"; Transliteration: "Bōkensha Girudo" (Japanese: 冒険者ギルド)	Ken'ichi Domon	Keiichirō Ōchi	Meigo Naitō	July 21, 2023
Luciel begins healing but runs out of magic due to inexperience and faints, resulting in one adventurer dying. Though the others all thank him he blames himself for the death. At the Adventurers Guild he strikes a deal with secretary Nanaera and guild master Brod to provide healing to adventurers in exchange for martial arts training and wages of 1 silver a day. Brod's brutal training involves improving his stamina, flexibility and strength which Luciel endures only through sheer stubbornness. Brod eventually shares that the Adventurers Guild is on the decline thanks to the Healers Guild; experienced adventurers are forced to retire due to crippling injuries, novice adventurers are forced to go on quests without adequate training and either die or return with injuries they can't afford to have healed, preventing them earning money until they heal naturally. Sickened by this Luciel swears to heal anyone who needs him for free. Straight away more injured adventures arrive who are surprised when Luciel heals them free of charge. Brod decides to change their deal; if Luciel continues healing for free he can live at the guild, receive wages and meals and be trained in martial arts by Brod every day.
3	"A Talent for Martial Arts"; Transliteration: "Bujutsu no Sainō" (Japanese: 武術の才能)	Masato Kitagawa	Keiichirō Ōchi	Masato Tamagawa	July 28, 2023
When word gets around Luciel heals for free most adventurers stop treating him with distrust. As part of his training Luciel is fed gigantic meals by guild chef Grulga, along with Substance-X, a truly disgusting potion that allows all skills to increase slightly faster. Due to its foulness no one else bothers to use it, but Luciel forces himself to drink a glass with every meal. Luciel's popularity increases when he heals a Cat-folk adventurer, showing he has no prejudice against them. As time passes his training intensifies, he gets more healing requests, and his servings of Substance-X increase from a glass to a jug. After a month Luciel has to return to the Healers guild to begin healing for money, since he is required to pay his guild fees to retain membership. Surprisingly, Brod gives him enough money for a whole year of fees, ensuring he can continue healing and training at the Adventurers guild for a year without worry. Upon his return Brod rewards him with a book on Holy magic that will allow Luciel to learn how to also cure illnesses as well.
4	"Substance X and a Small Change"; Transliteration: "Buttai Ekkusu to Sukoshi no Henka" (Japanese: 物体Xと少しの変化)	Masahiko Suzuki	Takahiro Nagase	Meigo Naitō	August 4, 2023
Brod sends Luciel to help in the guilds butchery room, helping Grulga's brother Galba turn monsters into meat. This turns out to be training on identifying how to kill monsters, leaving Luciel nauseous until Nanaera consoles him. The secretaries are tasked with teaching Luciel about the world; Luciel learns he lives in the Saint Shurule Republic, home of the Healers Guild headquarters and the only territory where slavery is illegal. 6 months later Nanaera notices Luciel's clothes no longer fit his more muscular physique and takes him shopping. They find Monika stabbed. Luciel heals her and Monika reveals the Healers Guild has been kidnapping people who owe them money and selling them to foreign countries where slavery isn't illegal. Monika spoke out against this and was nearly murdered for it. The culprit is most likely Botacouli, owner of the territories largest healing clinic, though there is no evidence. Brod hires Monika as receptionist to keep her safe. A monster attack causes dozens of adventurers to be injured and though Luciel heals them until he faints again several still die. The year comes to an end and Luciel plans to leave to begin earning money and one day open a clinic, open to all species and with fair prices.
5	"The Healing Clinic and the Arrival of Bottaculli"; Transliteration: "Chiyu Inchō Botakūri Tōjō" (Japanese: 治癒院長ボタクーリ登場)	Toshiyuki Sone	Takahiro Nagase	Shinji Itadaki	August 11, 2023
Karuru is able to promote him to Rank C due to his improved skill levels, allowing him to buy spell books of more advanced magic, though his description of his training makes her suspect he is a masochist. Unfortunately he can't afford the membership fees, never mind the promotion fee as well. Brod appears with enough money and even pays an entire gold coin for Luciel to stay at the Adventurers guild another year. The adventurers celebrate his return with a party and Luciel has an embarrassing moment with Monika. Elsewhere, Botacouli is furious his profits have halved thanks to Luciel and storms into the Adventurers guild to demand he stop healing for free and come work at his clinic. Remembering Botacouli was the one who had Monika attacked Luciel refuses and Botacouli flees when Brod threatens him. Realising Luciel now has a powerful enemy Brod shifts Luciel to Gladiator training and doubles his Substance-X portions, furthering his reputation as the Masochist Zombie Healer. In revenge Botacouli writes a letter to Guild headquarters praising Luciel's skills and recommending he be promoted and transferred to a prestigious clinic far away once his year with the Adventurers expires.
6	"On a Journey"; Transliteration: "Tabidachi" (Japanese: 旅立ち)	Motohiro Abe	Keiichirō Ōchi	Motohiro Abe	August 18, 2023
6 months pass and Luciel receives a letter from the Shurule Holy Church, signed by the Pope, informing him of his transfer to work at the Church. Brod uses his connections to ensure Botacouli can't have Luciel attacked there. Everyone also takes an interest in Luciel's love life; so far he hasn't had a single lover despite being adored by the secretaries. Everyone unanimously agrees this is Brod and Grulga's fault caused by Luciel's packed training schedule and bad breath caused by Substance-X. The year finally ends and Luciel is promoted as a Rank A healer. He asks Brod to create a training course where novices learn from experienced adventurers and avoid the mistakes that leave them relying on healers like Botacouli. He also says goodbye to Nanaera and Monika who helped support him the last two years, and promises to return one day. Brod promotes him to a Rank E adventurer and gifts him a magic item storage bag and some money. Luciel finally departs with Bazan and his party volunteering to escort him safely.
7	"The Holy City of Shurule"; Transliteration: "Seito Shurūru" (Japanese: 聖都シュルール)	Ken'ichi Domon	Shinji Satō	Shinji Itadaki	September 1, 2023
Luciel arrives at Holy City and goes to the local Adventurers Guild where he terrifies everyone by asking for three barrels of Substance-X. At the Church he is met by Father Granhart who is his new supervisor and also Lumina who commands the Churches all female security, the Valkyrie Paladins. Granhart agrees to discuss Luciel's concern over healer corruption with his fellow priests. He also informs Luciel he has been promoted to a Deacon Exorcist. Lumina informs him he will be working in the crypts under the church which, due to the number of magic users buried there, turned itself into a labyrinth some years ago with undead that must be culled regularly to stop them escaping. Exorcist Geordo shows Luciel the labyrinth and how to purify undead before quickly leaving, unable to stand the stench of dead bodies. Luciel is unaffected as it still smells better than Substance-X. Luciel figures out a faster way of purifying without having to recite a spell every time by applying the spell to weapons. By the end of the day, he successfully reaches the second floor.
8	"A Threat in the Boss Room"; Transliteration: "Bosu Heya no Kyōi" (Japanese: ボス部屋の脅威)	Akira Katō	Takahiro Nagase	Shinji Itadaki	September 1, 2023
Luciel visits Church shop manager Cattleya who converts his zombie crystals into over 4000 points, an unexpectedly high amount. Luciel uses his points buying a Holy Silver sword and short spear. Granhart continues looking out for him though his motive is unclear. Luciel reaches floor 5, after which zombies become more numerous and traps appear. On floor 10 he finds a door he is certain contains a dungeon boss. Geordo is surprised Luciel found the door already as it took him years to go that deep and no one has defeated that room yet. Luciel enters the room and finds he can't use his magic. The boss appears, a Wight that he defeats despite its wand negating his magic, opening a staircase to an even deeper floor 11. He returns his loot to Cattleya who, seeing the robe and wand, drags Luciel into an emergency meeting with the Pope herself. The robe and wand proves the Wight must have been Ozanario, an exorcist who disappeared in the labyrinth 12 years ago. As loot the items belong to Luciel but he agrees to sell them to the Pope for a magic sack which can hold far more than his magic bag.
9	"Training with the Paladin Regiment"; Transliteration: "Seikishitai to no Kunren" (Japanese: 聖騎士隊との訓練)	Masato Kitagawa	Keiichirō Ōchi	Shinji Itadaki	September 8, 2023
Luciel asks Lumina to include him in the Paladins daily training. Lumina agrees after hearing the risk he took facing the Wight. After receiving the magic sack Luciel explores to floor 15 in a single day. Joining the Paladins Luciel can barely maintain their fitness routine and is heavily criticized for dual wielding a sword and spear as it lacks defence. Luciel loses every duel but discovers in teams he is invaluable support on defence and healing and his team wins every time. Entering floor 16 Luciel switches to sword and shield and soon reaches floor 20 where he discovers another boss room. After weeks of Paladin training he defeats the floor 20 Wight and retrieves its magic bracelets, proving it was once a High Priest who disappeared in the labyrinth. The Pope reveals she believes all who disappeared since the labyrinth manifested are now Wights and enemies of the Church. The Pope hopes one day the labyrinth will be defeated and revert back to a peaceful cemetery for deceased healers, but for decades has been stuck using healers unsuited for combat just to prevent zombies escaping. In exchange for the bracelets Luciel receives anti-undead armour and weapons.
10	"The Secret of Substance X"; Transliteration: "Buttai Ekkusu no Himitsu" (Japanese: 物体Xの秘密)	Masahiko Suzuki	Shinji Satō	Shinji Itadaki	September 15, 2023
Luciel begins healing adventurers at the local guild. The adventurers agree to cease hostilities against clinics and change his nickname. Unfortunately, they change it to Saint Weirdo. Luciel gathers gossip from the adventurers; Brod has been forcing adventurers to train with him nonstop, Gulgar has been sneaking Substance-X into adventurer's food, and several receptionists are getting married, worrying Luciel it might be Nanaela or Monika. Six months later Luciel defeats the floor 30 bosses, three Wights. His use of Substance-X is noticed by Cattleya and the Pope, who reveals it was invented by a Sage to unlock latent magic, but it was a failure; plus its real name is actually Gods Lament due to its foulness. The Pope predicts thanks to Substance-X Luciel may become a Sage within a few years. The Pope reveals the three wights were girls she once knew. Cattleya gives Luciel the official list of Substance-X's effects; by sacrificing one of the three primal desires; food, sleep or sex, the drinker gains increased physical growth, skill enhancement and protection from illness. Luciel is horrified to realise, with his love of food and sleep that he must have lost his desire for sex, explaining why he is still a virgin despite being surrounded by beautiful women. He resolves to defeat the dungeon so he can quit Substance-X, fall in love and have lots of sex.
11	"Trouble in St. Shurule"; Transliteration: "Seito Shurūru no Ihen" (Japanese: 聖都シュルールの異変)	Shin'ya Kawabe, Tarō Ikegami, Yuka Hashimoto, Nobuhiro Mutō	Keiichirō Ōchi	Motohiro Abe	September 22, 2023
One month later, Luciel reaches floor 40 but hesitates before facing the boss. At the adventurers guild he encounters mute Cat-folk girl Sheila, just as he discovers Monika and Nanaella are there to visit him. Sheila hurries him to the slums to heal her father from Yenice City, attacked by bandits. Luciel also heals sick slum dwellers. Monika and Nanaella explain they are not the receptionists getting married and Luciel is furious to discover the local guild master forgot to pass on a years worth of letters from his friends. Luciel spends 3 days with Monika and Nanaella before they return home. Sheila's father negotiates with the Pope to open a healers guild in Yenice and credits Luciel with his success. Luciel discovers Sheila has damaged vocal cords from a childhood accident and secretly casts an experimental healing spell, hoping it may one day allow her to speak. After duelling Lumina she deems him not ready for the floor 40 boss, so he trains for another 6 months before confronting the wight, a knight Templar who used to lead the paladins. After a duel lasting 7 days Luciel defeats him and obtains a spell book as loot. He discovers the door back to the surface has sealed itself, trapping him. With no other option he is forced to keep fighting to deeper floors and eventually reaches the floor 50 boss room.
12	"S-Rank Healer and Exorcist Luciel's Declaration"; Transliteration: "Esu-kyū Chiyushi Ken Taimashi Rushieru no Sengen" (Japanese: S級治癒士兼退魔士ルシエルの宣言)	Masato Tamagawa	Keiichirō Ōchi	Masato Tamagawa	September 29, 2023
Luciel reads the spell book and learns Sanctuary Circle, which defeats the floor 50 boss, but it briefly returns to its human appearance first. The final level 51 only contains an undead holy dragon, which Luciel defeats with Sanctuary circle. Temporarily cured of being undead the dragon reveals the labyrinth was constructed 50 years ago as a prison to hold him. As Luciel has a pure heart he grants Luciel his blessing and tasks him to save his fellow dragons. Before he dies the dragon tells Luciel many secrets. Cattleya is relieved upon his return as Luciel has been missing 6 months and Brod and hundreds of adventurers were threatening to invade the church. Luciel reports the truth to the Pope; all holy dragons were cursed with undeath by an evil God and imprisoned. As a result dark magic has spread uncontrollably. As the next hero won't be born for 40 years the next demon lord may be too strong for that hero to defeat. The Pope orders this kept secret until she can decide what to do. As a reward she reveals the reason Luciel is still level 1; the Gods see Substance-X as cheating and limit its users to level 1 as a penalty. For defeating the labyrinth Luciel is made a Bishop and S rank healer. With his new authority Luciel creates strict guidelines for healers fees. Elsewhere, Sheila finally speaks and Nanaella and Monika attend the secretaries wedding, where they both catch the bouquets.

== Reception ==
The series won the gold award (effectively second place) at the 4th Net Novel Award.

The novel series has sold over two million copies.
