= The New Gate (novel series) =

Japanese light novel series

- First light novel volume cover
- Genre: Isekai
- Novel series
- Written by: Shinogi Kazanami
- Published by: Shōsetsuka ni Narō (2013–2016); AlphaPolis (2016–present)
- Original run: 2013 – present
- Light novel
- Written by: Shinogi Kazanami
- Illustrated by: Makai no Jūnin (volume 1-9); KeG (volume 10-11); Akira Banpai (volume 12+)
- Published by: AlphaPolis
- English publisher: NA: Hanashi Media
- Original run: December 27, 2013 – present
- Volumes: 23
- Manga
- Written by: Shinogi Kazanami
- Illustrated by: Yoshiyuki Miwa
- Published by: AlphaPolis
- English publisher: NA: One Peace Books
- Magazine: AlphaPolis
- Original run: November 11, 2014 – present
- Volumes: 15
- Anime television series
- Directed by: Tamaki Nakatsu
- Written by: Hiroki Uchida
- Music by: Yuya Mori; Tatsuhiko Saiki; Misaki Tsuchida; Tsugumi Tanaka
- Studio: Cloud Hearts; Yokohama Animation Laboratory
- Licensed by: Crunchyroll: SA/SEA: Muse Communication
- Original network: Tokyo MX, BS11, MBS, AT-X
- Original run: April 14, 2024 – June 30, 2024
- Episodes: 12
- icon

The New Gate (stylized in all caps) is a Japanese light novel series written by Shinogi Kazanami. The series originated on the Shōsetsuka ni Narō website in 2013, until pulled by the author in August 2016, before being published in print by AlphaPolis with illustrations by Makai no Jūnin, KeG, and Akira Banpai beginning in December 2013.

A manga adaptation, illustrated by Yoshiyuki Miwa, began serialization on AlphaPolis' website in November 2014. A mobile game based on the novel was released in October 2016; with its service disconnected in January 2021. An anime television series adaptation produced by Cloud Hearts and Yokohama Animation Laboratory aired from April to June 2024.

== Premise ==
"The New Gate" Follows Shin, the strongest player in a virtual world, who defeats the final boss of the game and frees the trapped players. He then awakens 500 years later in the game's transformed world.

== Characters ==
Shinya Kiritani (桐谷 進也, Kiritani Shin'ya) / Shin (シン)
Voiced by: Kensho Ono

Main hero of the story, Shin was the most powerful player in the game "The New Gate" who played as a powerful "high human", who after defeating the 'player killers' and the final boss, finds himself in the real world of "The New Gate" 500 years later. He disguises the fact he is a high human by claiming he is a "chosen".

Schnee Raizar (シュニー・ライザー, Shunī Raizā)
Voiced by: Asami Seto

One of Shin's followers in the game, Schnee is a "high elf" and the action proprietor of the Moon Shrine. She has long be awaiting the return of Shin as she is in love with him.

Tiera Lucent (ティエラ・ルーセント, Tiera Rūsento)
Voiced by: Kaede Hondo

An elf who manages the Moon Shrine for Schnee, she was cursed causing her silver hair to turn black. Shin was able to remove the curse, restoring some of her hair to its normal color.

Yuzuha (ユズハ)
Voiced by: Miho Okasaki

An elementail monster who is a nine-tail fox. She formed a tamer contract with Shin. She later is able to turn into a little girl.

Wilhelm Avis (ヴィルヘルム・エイビス, Viruherumu Eibisu)
Voiced by: Shunya Hiruma

A powerful adventurer with a legendary mystical weapon called "Venom". Despite his appearance, he is a kind man and ally of Shin and protects Millie.

Millie (ミリー, Mirī)
Voiced by: Akiho Suzumoto

A young Beastgirl being raise by the Church who is an oracle. She has been the target of dark forces and been protected by Shin and others.

Rashia Luzel (ラシア・ルゼル, Rashia Ruzeru)
Voiced by: Kaori Ishihara
Rionne Strail Bayreuth (リオン・シュトライル・ベイルリヒト, Rion Shutorairu Beirurihito)
Voiced by: Lynn
Kagerou (カゲロウ)
Voiced by: Yūki Hoshi
Girard Estrella (ジラート・エストレア, Jirāto Esutorea)
Voiced by: Satoshi Mikami
Wolfgang Estrella (ウォルフガング・エストレア, Uorufugangu Esutorea)
Voiced by: Tatsuhisa Suzuki
Cuore Estrella (クオーレ・エストレア, Kuōre Esutorea)
Voiced by: Kana Hanazawa

== Media ==
=== Light novel ===
Written by Shinogi Kazanami, the series began publication on the novel posting website Shōsetsuka ni Narō in 2013. It was later acquired by AlphaPolis, who began publishing the series in print with illustrations by Makai no Jūnin on December 27, 2013. KeG illustrated volumes 10 and 11 and Akira Banpai has illustrated the series since volume 12. In August 2016, the series was removed from the Shōsetsuka ni Narō website and transferred to AlphaPolis' website. As of June 2024, twenty-three volumes have been published.

In September 2025, Hanashi Media announced that they licensed the series for English digital publication.

==== Volumes ====
No.	Original release date	Original ISBN	English release date	English ISBN
1	December 27, 2013	978-4-43-418727-8	October 30, 2025	978-1-961788-39-8
2	June 4, 2014	978-4-43-419312-5	January 30, 2026	978-1-961788-44-2
3	November 1, 2014	978-4-43-419892-2	April 30, 2026	978-1-961788-54-1
4	April 4, 2015	978-4-43-420428-9	August 29, 2026	978-1-961788-75-6
5	September 5, 2015	978-4-43-421006-8	—	—
6	February 2, 2016	978-4-43-421578-0	—	—
7	July 9, 2016	978-4-43-422120-0	—	—
8	December 5, 2016	978-4-43-422698-4	—	—
9	April 5, 2017	978-4-43-423123-0	—	—
10	September 1, 2017	978-4-43-423683-9	—	—
11	February 3, 2018	978-4-43-424217-5	—	—
12	July 2, 2018	978-4-43-424812-2	—	—
13	December 3, 2018	978-4-43-425394-2	—	—
14	April 3, 2019	978-4-43-425801-5	—	—
15	October 1, 2019	978-4-43-426517-4	—	—
16	March 4, 2020	978-4-43-427160-1	—	—
17	September 4, 2020	978-4-43-427777-1	—	—
18	March 6, 2021	978-4-43-428551-6	—	—
19	September 5, 2021	978-4-43-429266-8	—	—
20	February 28, 2022	978-4-43-429990-2	—	—
21	September 30, 2022	978-4-43-430874-1	—	—
22	November 30, 2023	978-4-43-432940-1	—	—
23	June 19, 2024	978-4-43-434063-5	—	—

=== Manga ===
A manga adaptation, illustrated by Yoshiyuki Miwa, began serialization on AlphaPolis' website on November 11, 2014. As of May 2024, the manga's individual chapters have been collected into fifteen tankōbon volumes.

In March 2020, One Peace Books announced that they licensed the manga for English publication. AlphaPolis is also publishing the manga in English via their Alpha Manga service.

==== Volumes ====
No.	Original release date	Original ISBN	English release date	English ISBN
1	August 31, 2015	978-4-43-420843-0	April 16, 2020	978-1-64-273052-4
2	March 31, 2016	978-4-43-421654-1	May 26, 2020	978-1-64-273062-3
3	November 30, 2016	978-4-43-422530-7	October 14, 2020	978-1-64-273076-0
4	June 30, 2017	978-4-43-423288-6	December 9, 2020	978-1-64-273077-7
5	February 28, 2018	978-4-43-424180-2	May 25, 2021	978-1-64-273111-8
6	January 31, 2019	978-4-43-425436-9	July 20, 2021	978-1-64-273112-5
7	May 31, 2019	978-4-43-425890-9	December 15, 2021	978-1-64-273142-2
8	January 4, 2020	978-4-43-426872-4	January 15, 2022	978-1-64-273143-9
9	July 31, 2020	978-4-43-427627-9	April 5, 2022	978-1-64-273166-8
10	February 28, 2021	978-4-43-428560-8	June 21, 2022	978-1-64-273167-5
11	October 31, 2021	978-4-43-429506-5	January 10, 2023	978-1-64-273193-4
12	June 30, 2022	978-4-43-430459-0	February 6, 2024	978-1-64-273339-6
13	February 28, 2023	978-4-43-431656-2	January 28, 2025	978-1-64-273390-7
14	March 31, 2024	978-4-43-433613-3	February 25, 2025	978-1-64-273450-8
15	May 22, 2024	978-4-43-433909-7	August 21, 2025	978-1-64-273535-2
16	January 31, 2025	978-4-43-435155-6	April 28, 2026	978-1-64-273595-6
17	October 31, 2025	978-4-43-435519-6	—	—

=== Mobile game ===
A free-to-play mobile game based on the novel series, developed and published by AlphaPolis, launched on iOS and Android on October 4, 2016. Its service ended on January 27, 2021.

=== Anime ===
An anime television series adaptation was announced on November 9, 2023. The series is animated by Cloud Hearts and Yokohama Animation Laboratory, and directed by Tamaki Nakatsu, with series composition by Hiroki Uchida, character designs by Itsuki Takemoto, and music composed by Yuya Mori, Tatsuhiko Saiki, Misaki Tsuchida, and Tsugumi Tanaka. It aired from April 14 to June 30, 2024, on Tokyo MX and other networks. (Note: Tokyo MX lists the series premiere at 25:30 on April 13, 2024, which is effectively 1:30 a.m. JST on April 14.) The opening theme song is "Sekai wo Yanuite" (世界を射抜いて), performed by Sou, while the ending theme song is "Kanataboshi" (カナタボシ), performed by Miho Okasaki. Crunchyroll licensed the series. Muse Communication licensed the series in Asia-Pacific.

==== Episodes ====
No.	Title (Note: All English titles are taken from Crunchyroll.)	Directed by (Note: Information is taken from the ending credits of each episode.)	Written by	Storyboarded by	Original release date
1	"The Third Truth"; Transliteration: "Dai-san no Shinjitsu" (Japanese: 第3の真実)	Ken Katō	Hiroki Uchida	Tamaki Nakatsu	April 14, 2024
After the online game The New Gate suddenly changed from a VRMMORPG into a life-or-death simulator and trapped the players inside, Shin gained critical acclaim in-game and eventually defeats the final boss, freeing everyone from their shared nightmare. Shin watches as everyone is finally able to log out of the game, but when he tries to do the same, he wakes up in the game world 500 years in the future--only this time, everything is real. Not only are things very different, but Shin's in-game race, High Human, is supposedly extinct. Upon returning to his home base, the Moon Sanctum, he meets a strange elf woman named Tiera, who gives him information on one of his support characters, Schnee Raizer. To learn more about the world's changes, he goes to the nearby town of Bayrelicht and joins the Adventurer's Guild.
2	"A Little Partner"; Transliteration: "Chīsana Aibō" (Japanese: 小さな相棒)	Yuma Ōue	Hiroki Uchida	Harume Kosaka	April 21, 2024
After defeating a unique monster with a holy sword, Shin's killing blow sends the sword flying, where it crashes through the window of Bayrelicht's royal palace. This piques the interest of Lady Rionne, the kingdom's second princess, who orders her men to find the one who threw the sword. Defeating the Skullface Jack is a big deal at the Guild, as it would make Shin equal in power to an entire A-Rank party. Shin meets another adventurer named Wilhelm Avis. The next day, Shin attempts to research the last 500 years of history with mixed results, then later meets an orphaned tiger beastkin girl named Millie and runs into Wil again. As Wil takes Millie back to the orphanage, she gives Shin a cryptic message to save a life. Tiera finally gets a message to Schnee.
3	"A Strange Request"; Transliteration: "Kimyōna Irai" (Japanese: 奇妙な依頼)	Kai Kanemoto	Hiroki Uchida	Isowa	April 28, 2024
The life that needed rescuing turned out to be an Elementail kit, which is an extremely rare legendary creature, and Shin forms a contract with her to keep her identity a secret, naming her Yuzuha. Back in town, Shin takes a quest for the church orphanage and reports back to Millie at the same time, becoming popular with the other orphans. To help the orphanage, he teaches the previous head priest's granddaughter, Rashia, the Purify Skill.
4	"After the Long Night"; Transliteration: "Nagaki Yoru o Koete" (Japanese: 長き夜を越えて)	Yuma Ōue	Nagase Takehiro	Yoshihide Ibata	May 5, 2024
Schnee rushes home to see Shin. Back in the Spirit Plains, Shin, Wil, and Rashia face an epic monster, and Shin partially reveals his identity to Wil to help them escape. During the battle, Shin sees an ally arrive on his map sensor, who turns out to be Schnee, who then helps him cleanse the plains. They catch up for a bit, Yuzuha goes through some changes, then rush to meet up with Wil and Rashia before they can report to the Guild. Lady Rionne is still looking for Shin, still not knowing who she's looking for.
5	"A Momentary Break"; Transliteration: "Ichiji no Kyūsoku" (Japanese: 一時の休息)	Ryuta Yamamoto	Nagase Takehiro	Shinji Itadaki	May 12, 2024
Shin explains who he is to Wil, then the four of them return to Bayrelicht. Shin and Schnee head back to the Moon Sanctum and have a lively dinner with Tiera. Yuzuha gains a human form and reveals a bit about what she remembers of the shrine. After, Schnee informs Shin their old friend Girart is still around.
6	"Escort Mission"; Transliteration: "Goei Ninmu" (Japanese: 護衛任務)	Yuma Ōue	Yuji Onishi	Yoshihiko Iwata	May 19, 2024
Shin takes Tiera to the Guild to get her registered, then they run some errands before taking a merchant escort quest headed in the direction of the Beast Kingdom of Farnid. Shin, Tiera, and Yuzuha leave on the quest ahead of Schnee. Meanwhile, the King and his counsel are concerned about the Moon Sanctum's disappearance. Shin and company are attacked by bandits and he loses his cool.
7	"Bayreun"; Transliteration: "Beirūn" (Japanese: ベイルーン)	Yuma Ōue	Yuji Onishi	Yoshihiko Iwata	May 26, 2024
It's revealed the merchant's cargo was connected to the church, making Shin suspicious. After completing the quest and parting ways with their new friends, they buy a carriage and continue on to Farnid after Schnee arrives with a sacred beast, named Shimmer, to pull the carriage. It's revealed later that Tiera rescued Shimmer a century ago and Schnee transfers the monster contract to her. They finally arrive in Farnid and are escorted to Girart by his grandchildren.
8	"Trusted and Entrusted"; Transliteration: "Takusareru Mono, Takusu Mono" (Japanese: 託されるもの、託すもの)	Akira Kato	Yuji Onishi	Yoshihide Ibata	June 2, 2024
Girart and Shin catch up and reminisce, and Girart gives Shin bad news. After, he makes a request that Shin finally duel him. Girart reveals his plans to his friends and grandchildren to have a fight to the death with Shin in one week's time. In the meanwhile, they enjoy their remaining time together. When the day of the duel arrives, there are some emotional goodbyes, and the duel begins. After an intense battle, Girart is about to land a successful blow on Shin when time catches up to him. As a reward, Girart asks Shin to show him his full power.
9	"The Princess of Bayrelicht"; Transliteration: "Beirurihito no Ojo" (Japanese: ベイルリヒトの王女)	Yuma Ōue	Nagase Takahiro	Ryoji Fujiwara	June 9, 2024
After Girart's funeral, Schnee takes Shin to meet with another of his support characters, a High Dragnir named Schweid. Upon meeting again, Schweid re-pledges his loyalty to Shin and they once again party up. Later, Shin receives a summons from Bayrelicht's palace. Back at the Guild in Bayrelicht, the sword carried by the Skullface Jack is discussed again and it's revealed Lady Rionne was the source of the summons--she wants to duel.
10	"Demon" (Japanese: 瘴魔(デーモン))	Yuma Ōue	Nagase Takahiro	Minoru Ohara	June 16, 2024
Shin and Rionne's duel begins and concludes and he is asked to serve the kingdom, which he politely declines. He exchanges the sword for access to the restricted section of the library. As they return to the palace, they are ambushed and Shin and Rionne are teleported away to an unknown location. The location turns out to be the ruins of the Holy Land of Calkia. Shin is able to contact Schnee with Telepathy and they form a plan to meet up in the city of Valmer. Schnee surmises the culprit behind the ambush is a demon and takes care of it before leaving for Valmer with Tiera.
11	"The Closed Holy Land"; Transliteration: "Tozasareta Seichi" (Japanese: 閉ざされた聖地)	Yuma Ōue	Yuji Onishi	Hideki Tonokatsu	June 23, 2024
Rionne explains what the Holy Lands are and Shin worries there's no way out without exposing his full power to Rionne. After some experimentation, Shin learns Calkia is actually a unique dungeon they need to clear. As they near the exit, Shin gets the feeling something doesn't want them to leave just as they are attacked by a frost griffin. It proves a challenging foe, but he eventually prevails. He and Rionne finally head for Valmer and stumble upon a monster horde headed for the city.
12	"Major Flood"; Transliteration: "Dai Hanran" (Japanese: 大氾濫)	Akira Kato	Hiroki Uchida	Shinji Itadaki	June 30, 2024
Rionne explains the horde is known as a "flood," which forms from concentrated mana from Holy Lands. Shin and Rionne rush to help to defend Valmer and inform the Guild and the local lord when they arrive to begin prep. While wandering Valmer, Shin runs into one of his IRL friend's support characters, Berrett, and learns some things about his friends and other potential players being stuck in the game, too. The flood suddenly disappears, mimicking a fake-out tactic used in one of the game's events. Wil and Rashia arrive to help fight the flood, and Shin dons a disguise to use his full power without being discovered. There is a party to celebrate there being no casualties and Shin and Schnee have a chat.

== Reception ==
John Oppliger of AnimeNation felt it was similar to other works of the isekai genre, but that it was "far more personable and approachable" than other series in the genre. He also praised Miwa illustrations, though noted it uses a lot of screentone. Demelza of Anime UK News described the worldbuilding as boring and the lead character and artwork as bland. She also felt that it lacked any new ideas compared to other isekai works.

By February 2023, the novels and manga had a combined circulation of 2.34 million.
