= Hello World (film) =

2019 Japanese animated film by Tomohiko Itō

- Theatrical release poster
- Directed by: Tomohiko Itō
- Screenplay by: Mado Nozaki
- Produced by: Feng Nian; Katsuhiro Takei
- Starring: Takumi Kitamura; Tori Matsuzaka; Minami Hamabe; Haruka Fukuhara; Minako Kotobuki; Rie Kugimiya; Takehito Koyasu
- Cinematography: Yoshiki Obata
- Edited by: Shigeru Nishiyama
- Music by: 2027Sound
- Backgrounds by: Takayuki Nagashima
- Production company: Graphinica
- Distributed by: Toho
- Release dates: September 11, 2019 (Kyoto); September 20, 2019 (Japan)
- Running time: 98 minutes
- Country: Japan
- Language: Japanese
- Box office: US$25.5 million

Hello World (stylized in all caps) is a 2019 Japanese animated science fiction romantic drama film directed by Tomohiko Itō from an original screenplay written by Mado Nozaki. Produced by Graphinica and distributed by Toho, the film is set in a futuristic Kyoto where a high school student named Naomi Katagaki encounters a person claiming to be himself, who time-traveled from 10 years in the future to save a classmate named Ruri Ichigyō.

The film stars Takumi Kitamura, Tori Matsuzaka, and Minami Hamabe. In December 2018, Itō announced that he would be directing the film, along with Nozaki and character animation designer Yukiko Horiguchi, making it his first film outside Sword Art Online series that he was known for directing.

Hello World premiered in Kyoto on September 11, 2019, and was released in Japan on September 20. The film grossed over $25 million worldwide, with critics praising the direction and animation. The film received novelization, two manga adaptations, and an anime spin-off.

== Plot ==
Set in Kyoto 2024, the Japanese government has made plans to collect and preserve the city's natural architecture and culture through drones in real time, storing all its data in an infinite-capacity quantum computer known as Alltale. Naomi Katagaki is an indecisive high school student living in Kyoto who harbors a love for reading. One day after school, a mysterious yatagarasu steals his library book and in an attempt to get it back, he meets a strange man that appears out of nowhere. This man, whom only Naomi can see, is revealed to be himself from 10 years later, now grown up and an adult. The adult Naomi explains that he has accessed Alltale from the real world outside in order to change the recorded past and save Naomi's to-be girlfriend, his classmate Ruri Ichigyō, after she was unfortunately struck by lightning at a fireworks festival and rendered comatose. The teenage Naomi decides to call his adult self 'Sensei' and agrees to help, as his adult self has limited capabilities as an avatar within Alltale. Sensei then gifts Naomi a special power, God's Hand, which manifests from the yatagarasu as a translucent gloved hand, to allow him to create anything as long as its chemical and physical structure is not overly complex.

Consulting his own diary, Sensei leads Naomi to slowly gain Ruri's affection and they eventually fall in love. On the night of the incident, Naomi refuses to invite her out for the festival and remains outside her house per Sensei's orders. They realise that due to this being a world within Alltale, Sensei's interference has caused its Homeostatic System to kick in. Bots in the form of kitsune men appear attempting to correct the data, transporting Ruri and Naomi to the site of the incident. Summoning a black hole, Naomi erases not only the kitsune men, but also the stroke of lightning that would have hit the tree Ruri was originally supposed to have waited at and hence the accident, successfully rescuing Ruri and rewriting the data.

In a twist of events, Sensei suddenly reclaims God's Hand and teleports Ruri away before disappearing. Naomi is shocked as he realizes that Sensei's plan was to recreate Ruri's original mental state in Alltale so that the data within could be synced with Ruri's own comatose mind in the real world, enabling her to wake up. Returning, defeated, to the city, Naomi is suddenly faced with thousands of kitsune men – an effect of Sensei deciding to reboot the system after all data relevant to Ruri's existence has been rewritten. The system then automatically starts filtering parts of data to keep and those to be erased, causing the space within 2024 Kyoto to shift and for red auroras to appear in the sky. Naomi, recalling how Ruri was teleported away in a similar fashion, jumps into the redness. He awakes in a virtual space to the yatagarasu, who assures him that he is not dead and promises to help him save Ruri, manifesting God's Hand for him once more.

Meanwhile, in the real world, Sensei embraces Ruri, who has woken up from a coma. However, kitsune men soon start appearing around the room targeting her, Sensei realized his world is also a world within Alltale. Teenage Naomi warps to Ruri's hospital room and prepares to bring her to the staircase outside Alltale's complex, which has the optimal spatial coordinates for them to return to their original world. With help from Sensei, they manage to outrun the kitsune men and Ruri returns to her time via a portal created by God's Hand. The kitsune men, shifting their targets to the two Naomis, transform into a horrible gigantic creature that overpowers Naomi's strength. In the last moment, Sensei sacrifices himself, knowing that there can only be one Naomi and thanking his past self for letting him see Ruri smile again, wishing for him to always be happy. Inside the Alltale Management Facility, Alltale is successfully shut down after its data goes haywire and begins to duplicate itself. Alltale logic system has been deactivated which makes it possible for a parallel world to happen inside Alltale. In tears, Naomi returns to Ruri and the two share a kiss. As the data has been written and rewritten beyond recognition, Naomi greets a parallel world ahead of him and Ruri.

In the final scene, adult Naomi awakens atop a human civilization on the Moon, to the overlapping voice of the yatagarasu and an adult Ruri, implying that Naomi fell into a coma after saving Ruri due to the injuries from failing to enter Alltale in his previous attempts and now it was adult Ruri transferring Naomi's memory from Alltale to the real world.

== Voice cast ==
- Takumi Kitamura as Naomi Katagaki:
  A 16-year-old high school student living in Kyoto in 2024 and the film's protagonist. Kitamura's experience as a library committee member in his elementary days made him understand his character in the film as a "soft and warm boy" who spends time feeling comfortable with books.
- Tori Matsuzaka as adult Naomi Katagaki / Sensei:
  Naomi Katagaki's future-self from 10 years later in 2037 and a chief officer in Alltale Management Facility. Matsuzaka was a "little worried" about what kind of animal he would be voicing in this film after dubbing the main character in Paddington (2014) but was relieved to find out it would be a human being instead.
- Minami Hamabe as Ruri Ichigyō:
  Naomi Katagaki's classmate and a fellow book committee member. Hamabe described her character in the film as an "honest and clumsy girl, [with] a strong core". Despite being not used to voice acting, she was given "trial and error" by Itō.

Also appearing in the film are Haruka Fukuhara as Misuzu Kadenokōji, the class idol who become friends with Ichigyō; Minako Kotobuki as Yiyi Xu, adult Katagaki's Chinese subordinate; Rie Kugimiya as the crow; and Takehito Koyasu as Tsunehisa Senko, adult Katagaki's colleague and professor at Alltale Management Facility.

== Production ==
=== Development ===
Around 2015, producer Katsuhiro Takei wanted to do a science fiction-related project with Tomohiko Itō using computer graphics but there weren't many studios with the strength to do a 3DCG animated film at that time. A producer at Toho contacted Itō about making a film in 3D after finding an article he had written in a web interview at the end of 2014 regarding his desire to do a 3D film.

In December 2018, Itō revealed the title of the original anime film that he would be directing at Graphinica, which was described as an "innovative yet traditional science-fiction love story". This marked the first time Itō directing a film outside Sword Art Online franchise. He felt that he needed to make this film "now" with a new team in the first year of a new era, referencing the scheduled Japanese imperial transition in April 2019. Itō laid out three "pillars" in making the film: a "drama" between the present and future self, a cute "character", and the expression of the "world view" of the electronic world and virtual space. The plot of the film was revealed in April 2019 with a teaser visual.

=== Pre-production ===
Joining Itō are screenwriter Mado Nozaki and character animation designer Yukiko Horiguchi, who were both confirmed in December 2018. In April 2019, Takumi Kitamura, Tori Matsuzaka, and Minami Hamabe were announced to be voicing their respective roles in the film as Naomi Katagaki, an adult Katagaki, and Ruri Ichigyō. In selecting the three actors, Itō stated that he only thought about the work even though they were newcomers in the field of anime, while also revealing his fascination with Matsuzaka's voice acting in the Japanese dub version of Paddington (2014). Additional voice cast were announced in June 2019, including Haruka Fukuhara as Misuzu Kadenokōji, Minako Kotobuki as Yiyi Xu, Rie Kugimiya as the crow, and Takehito Koyasu as Tsunehisa Senko.

=== Filming and animation ===
The first location scouting in Kyoto took two days in mid-December 2018 to complete, during which interviews were conducted with current high school students to research their daily lives in school. In addition to Fushimi Inari Shrine and Kyoto Tower, the crew also filmed "humble areas" such as the rooftop of the school and the interior of the classrooms. They also visited other places such as the Horikawa Gojo area to use as a reference for background layout and 3DCG modeling.

Graphinica handled the 3DCG animation, which covered a high percentage of the film despite having a lot of 2D backgrounds drawn by the background art production studio Bamboo. Graphinica's 2D animators drew the scenes with emotional expressions, while the action scenes were being filmed with camera work that only 3DCG could provide. Several cuts in the film used a combination of both such as people walking along the road instead of the main character.

=== Post-production ===
Before the film's release, Kitamura revealed that it took 3 to 4 days for his lines to be recorded, experiencing a hard time to "[get] into the emotions at the beginning" due to being new with voice acting.

== Music ==
The music used in Hello World was composed by 2027Sound, a music group project intending to "[create] a new form of film music by the most interesting artists of today". The musicians involved in the project were Okamoto's, Official Hige Dandism, Nulbarich, OBKR, Yaffle, STUTS, Brian Shinsekai, and Aaamyyy. The three theme music used in the film were "New World" (新世界, Shin Sekai) by Okamoto's, "Yesterday" (イエスタデイ) by Official Hige Dandism, and "Lost Game" by Nulbarich. The film's official soundtrack was released on September 18, 2019. "Yesterday" topped the Japan Hot Animation chart on September 23, 2019.

== Marketing ==
The first special video of Hello World was released in May 2019, while the second one was released in June. The film was novelized by Nozaki, which was published by Shueisha Bunko on June 21, 2019. A trailer for the film was released in July 2019. The first manga adaptation of the film by Manatsu Suzuki and Yoshihiro Sono began serialization in Shueisha's Ultra Jump magazine on July 19, 2019, and ended on March 19, 2020. The second manga adaptation by Rippo Inukai, titled "If", was launched in Shonen Jump+ on August 9, 2019. On November 30, 2020, Seven Seas Entertainment announced that they had licensed both the novel and the first manga adaptations of the film.

Promotional partners for the film included Bunbougu Cafe, where menus were designed to reflect the film's world could be ordered; Nakabayashi, which merchandized a Logical Air Swing notebook that was used by young Katagaki in the film; MK Taxi, which offered a pilgrimage tour around the places that were featured in the film; and Hare apparel brand.

== Release ==
=== Theatrical ===
Hello World held its world premiere at Higashi Hongan-ji in Kyoto on September 11, 2019, and was released in Japan on September 20. In Italy, Hello World was previously scheduled to be released on March 9, 2020, before it was shifted to May 4 until the film was decided to skip theaters and be released on home media on December 10 due to the COVID-19 pandemic. The film was released in China on June 11, 2021.

=== Home media ===
Hello World was released on Blu-ray and DVD on April 8, 2020. The Blu-ray special edition is bundled with the light novel written by Nozaki and an anime spin-off of the film titled Another World. The Japan Foundation Touring Film Programme released the film in the United Kingdom through their website on February 20, 2021, and again on March 1 with a 48-hour rental window. Anime Limited released the film on Blu-ray in the United Kingdom on March 13, 2023.

== Reception ==
=== Box office ===
Hello World grossed $4.4 million in Japan and $21.1 million in other territories, for a worldwide total of $25.5 million.

Hello World earned $1.97 million in its opening weekend, ranking sixth behind No Longer Human (2019). The film earned $677,600 in its second weekend, staying in sixth; $420,100 in its third weekend, coming in ninth; and $150,200 in its fourth weekend, dropping out of the ranking.

Outside Japan, Hello World grossed $53,752 in Hong Kong. The film amassed $6.3 million in its opening weekend in China, earning more than its full theatrical run back in Japan.

=== Critical response ===
Writing for The Japan Times, Matt Schley described the theme of Hello World as either "thrill[ing] or frustrat[ing]" but commended Itō and Nozaki for keeping the story grounded despite its complexity. He praised the "well-written and charming" interaction of the characters. Melalin Mahavongtrakul of Bangkok Post felt that the film was "beautifully" animated, had "nice" music, and had some sequences comparable to Inception (2010). Karen de Vera of Cosmopolitan Philippines described the film as a combination of The Matrix films and Black Mirror television series in an anime high school romance setting. Kim Morrissy of Anime News Network felt that the relationship between young Katagaki and Ichigyō was "endearingly awkward" and found the plot and setting "empty and underdeveloped", while lauding the "cute" romance and the strong animation.

=== Accolades ===
Year	Award	Category	Nominee(s)	Result	Ref.
2019	CG World Awards	Users' Choice: CG Animation	Hello World	Won	
2020	Seiun Award	Best Japanese Novel	Hello World (novel)	Nominated	
2020	Seiun Award	Best Dramatic Presentation	Hello World	Nominated	
2020	Sitges Film Festival	Best Animated Feature Film	Hello World	Nominated	

== Spin-off ==
=== Another World ===
An anime spin-off series, titled Another World (stylized in all caps), was announced in August 2019, which follows Katagaki's point of view from 10 years in the future. The series was produced by Hikari TV, with Itō serving as the creative supervisor, Nozaki handling the script, and Horiguchi designing the characters. Kitamura, Hamabe, Kotobuki, and Koyasu reprised their film roles for the series, with Tomoyo Kurosawa and Yoshitsugu Matsuoka joining them.

Another World was first released on Hikari TV's Channel+ and video-on-demand services on September 13, 2019, consisting of three episodes, and concluded on October 4.

No.	Title	Directed by	Written by	Original release date
1	"Record 2024"	Toshiyuki Yamashita	Mado Nozaki	September 13, 2019
2	"Record 2032"	Shintaro Doge	Mado Nozaki	September 27, 2019
3	"Record 2036"	Kazumasa Yokokawa	Mado Nozaki	October 4, 2019
