= Cloud Hearts =

Japanese animation studio

Cloud Hearts Co., Ltd.
- Native name: 株式会社クラウドハーツ
- Romanized name: Kabushiki-gaisha Cloud Hearts
- Company type: Kabushiki gaisha
- Industry: Japanese animation
- Founded: June 1, 2021; 5 years ago
- Defunct: December 18, 2024; 17 months ago
- Headquarters: Asagaya, Suginami, Tokyo, Japan
- Key people: Satoshi Nakatani (President); Keisuke Fukunaga (Director); Tarou Ikegami (Director); Yuuma Ooue (Director); Shinsaku Tanaka (Director)
- Website: cloudhearts.co.jp

Cloud Hearts Co., Ltd. (Japanese: 株式会社クラウドハーツ, Hepburn: Kabushiki-gaisha Cloud Hearts) was a Japanese animation studio based in Suginami, Tokyo.

== History ==
The studio existed as a branch of Yokohama Animation Lab in the mid-2010s credited under the name "YAL/CHst" (an acronym of "Yokohama Animation Lab / CloudHearts studio") before being officially established as a separate legal entity (but still under the studio's corporate group) on June 1, 2021, by producer Satoshi Nakatani. Since May 2024, the studio was delisted from its parent company due to its apparent closure. On December 18, 2024, the company officially began bankruptcy proceedings.

== Works ==
=== Television series ===
Year	Title	Director(s)	Animation producer(s)	Source	Eps.	Refs.
2021	Tawawa on Monday 2	Yuki Ogawa	Satoshi Nakatani	Manga	12	
2023	The Iceblade Sorcerer Shall Rule the World	Masahiro Takata	Satoshi Nakatani	Light novel	12	
2023	The Great Cleric (co-animated with Yokohama Animation Laboratory)	Masato Tamagawa	Satoshi Nakatani	Light novel	12	
2023	Rail Romanesque 2 (co-animated with Yokohama Animation Laboratory)	Michiru Ebata	Yuuma Ooue	Eroge visual novel	12	
2024	The New Gate (co-animated with Yokohama Animation Laboratory)	Tamaki Nakatsu	Yuuma Ooue	Light novel	12	
2024	Whisper Me a Love Song (co-animated with Yokohama Animation Laboratory episodes 1–10)	Akira Mano (Note: Cai Xinya was originally directing the series but had to be replaced sometime during production by Akira Mano due to health issues.)	Yuuma Ooue	Manga	12	
