= Legend of Mana: The Teardrop Crystal =

Japanese anime television series

- Key visual

聖剣伝説 LEGEND OF MANA —THE TEARDROP CRYSTAL— (Seiken Densetsu: Legend of Mana -The Teardrop Crystal-)
- Created by: Square Enix
- Anime television series
- Directed by: Masato Jinbo
- Written by: Masato Jinbo
- Music by: Yoko Shimomura
- Studio: Yokohama Animation Laboratory; Graphinica
- Licensed by: Crunchyroll (streaming); SEA: Muse Communication
- Original network: MBS, TBS
- Original run: October 8, 2022 – December 24, 2022
- Episodes: 12

Legend of Mana: The Teardrop Crystal, known in Japan as Legend of the Sacred Sword: Legend of Mana -The Teardrop Crystal- (Japanese: 聖剣伝説 LEGEND OF MANA —THE TEARDROP CRYSTAL—, Hepburn: Seiken Densetsu: Legend of Mana -The Teardrop Crystal-), is a Japanese anime television series produced by Yokohama Animation Laboratory and Graphinica, based on the video game Legend of Mana by Square Enix. The series aired from October to December 2022.

== Characters ==
Shiloh (シャイロ, Shairo)
Voiced by: Nobunaga Shimazaki
Elazul (瑠璃, Ruri)
Voiced by: Yūichirō Umehara
Pearl (真珠姫, Shinju-hime)
Voiced by: Kaori Nazuka
Serafina (セラフィナ)
Voiced by: Saori Hayami
Bud (バド, Bado)
Voiced by: Yūko Sanpei
Corona (コロナ)
Voiced by: Shino Shimoji
Duelle (ドゥエル, Dueru)
Voiced by: Sachi Kokuryu
Li'l Cactus (サボテン君, Saboten-kun)
Voiced by: Yurika Kubo
Inspector Void (ボイド警部, Boido Keibu)
Voiced by: Shinpachi Tsuji
Sproutlings (草人, Kusabito)
Voiced by: Chitose Morinaga
Niccolo (ニキータ, Nikīta)
Voiced by: Wataru Takagi
Rachel (レイチェル, Reicheru)
Voiced by: Minami Takahashi
Mark (マーク, Māku)
Voiced by: Makoto Yasumura
Nouvelle (ヌヴェル, Nuveru)
Voiced by: Hiroshi Yanaka
Miss Yuka (ユカちゃん, Yuka-chan)
Voiced by: Misaki Kuno
Sandra (サンドラ, Sandora)
Voiced by: Minako Kotobuki
Esmeralda (エメロード, Emerōdo)
Voiced by: Ayane Sakura
Florina (蛍姫, Hotaru-hime)
Voiced by: Reina Ueda
Diana (ディアナ)
Voiced by: Manami Numakura

== Production ==
The anime was announced in June 2021 by Square Enix during a 30th anniversary livestream for the Mana video game series. The anime was animated by Yokohama Animation Laboratory and Graphinica, with Warner Bros. Japan producing the series. The project began after a Warner Bros. employee approached Masaru Oyamada, the producer of the Mana video games, and delivered a "passionate" pitch for a Legend of Mana adaptation. This in turn was what led to the development of a remaster of the Legend of Mana video game. The series was written and directed by Masato Jinbo, with character designs handled by Taro Ikegami based on the original designs by HACCAN, and music composed by Yoko Shimomura. The series aired from October 8 to December 24, 2022, on the Super Animeism block on MBS, TBS, and other networks. (Note: MBS listed the series premiere at 25:25 on October 7, 2022, which is effectively October 8 at 1:25 a.m.) Saori Hayami performed the opening theme song "Tear of Will" composed by Kevin Penkin. Crunchyroll streamed the series.

=== Episode list ===
No.	Title (Note: All English titles are taken from Crunchyroll.)	Original release date
1	"Lapis Lazuli"; Transliteration: "Rapisurazuri (Zenpen)" (Japanese: ラピスラズリ（前編）)	October 8, 2022
2	"Lapis Lazuli (Part 2)"; Transliteration: "Rapisurazuri (Kōhen)" (Japanese: ラピスラズリ（後編）)	October 15, 2022
3	"Ruby"; Transliteration: "Rubī" (Japanese: ルビー)	October 22, 2022
4	"Sapphire"; Transliteration: "Safaia" (Japanese: サファイア)	October 29, 2022
5	"White Pearl"; Transliteration: "Howaitopāru" (Japanese: ホワイトパール)	November 5, 2022
6	"Esmeralda"; Transliteration: "Emerarudo" (Japanese: エメラルド)	November 12, 2022
7	"Diamond"; Transliteration: "Daiamondo" (Japanese: ダイアモンド)	November 19, 2022
8	"Blackpearl"; Transliteration: "Burakkupāru" (Japanese: ブラックパール)	November 26, 2022
9	"Alexandrite"; Transliteration: "Arekusandoraito" (Japanese: アレクサンドライト)	December 3, 2022
10	"Fluorite"; Transliteration: "Furōraito" (Japanese: フローライト)	December 10, 2022
11	"Teardrop Crystal (Part 1)"; Transliteration: "Tiasutōn (Zenpen)" (Japanese: ティアストーン（前編）)	December 17, 2022
12	"Teardrop Crystal (Part 2)"; Transliteration: "Tiasutōn (Kōhen)" (Japanese: ティアストーン（後編）)	December 24, 2022
