= Yokohama Animation Laboratory =

Japanese animation studio

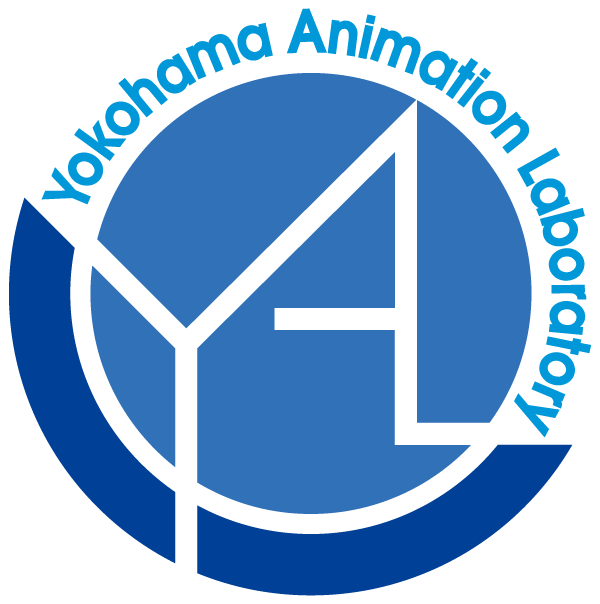
- Native name: 株式会社横浜アニメーションラボ
- Romanized name: Kabushiki-gaisha Yokohama Animēshon Rabo
- Type: Kabushiki gaisha
- Industry: Animation studio
- Founded: July 2015; 11 years ago
- Headquarters: 2-15-1 Yayoi, Naka-ku, Yokohama, Kanagawa Prefecture, Japan
- Key people: Yūma Ōue (President)
- Owner: Frontier Works (2025-present)
- Number of employees: 48 (as of May 2025)
- Subsidiaries: Kagoshima Art Laboratory
- Website: hama-ani.co.jp

Yokohama Animation Laboratory (Japanese: 株式会社横浜アニメーションラボ, Hepburn: Kabushiki-gaisha Yokohama Animēshon Rabo) is a Japanese animation studio based in Naka-ku, Yokohama. It was founded in July 2015 by former Production I.G's Division 7 producer Yūma Ōue.

On September 5, 2025, it was announced that Yokohama Animation Laboratory was acquired by Japanese company Frontier Works.

== Works ==
=== Television series ===
Title	Director(s)	First run start date	First run end date	Eps	Note(s)	Ref.
Lapis Re:Lights	Hiroyuki Hata	July 4, 2020	September 19, 2020	12	Part of the multimedia franchise created by KLab and Kadokawa Corporation.	
Magatsu Wahrheit -Zuerst-	Naoto Hosoda	October 13, 2020	December 29, 2020	12	Based on a smartphone game developed and published by KLab.	
The Genius Prince's Guide to Raising a Nation Out of Debt	Masato Tamagawa	January 11, 2022	March 29, 2022	12	Based on a light novel written by Toru Toba.	
Legend of Mana: The Teardrop Crystal	Masato Jinbo	October 8, 2022	December 24, 2022	12	Based on an action RPG game by Square Enix. Co-animated with Graphinica.	
The Great Cleric	Masato Tamagawa	July 14, 2023	September 29, 2023	12	Based on a light novel written by Broccoli Lion. Co-animated with Cloud Hearts.	
Rail Romanesque 2	Michiru Ebira	October 6, 2023	December 29, 2023	13	Spin-off of a visual novel developed by Lose. Second season. Co-animated with Cloud Hearts.	
The Kingdoms of Ruin	Keitaro Motonaga	October 7, 2023	December 23, 2023	12	Based on a manga written by yoruhashi.	
The Witch and the Beast	Takayuki Hamana	January 12, 2024	April 5, 2024	12	Based on a manga written by Kousuke Satake.	
The New Gate	Tamaki Nakatsu	April 14, 2024	June 30, 2024	12	Based on a light novel written by Shinogi Kazanami. Co-animated with Cloud Hearts.	
Whisper Me a Love Song	Akira Mano	April 14, 2024	December 29, 2024	12	Based on a manga written by Eku Takeshima. Co-animated with Cloud Hearts (#1–10 only).	
Sword of the Demon Hunter: Kijin Gentōshō	Kazuya Aiura	March 31, 2025	September 29, 2025	24	Based on a novel written by Moto'o Nakanishi.	
Hell Mode: The Hardcore Gamer Dominates in Another World with Garbage Balancing	Masato Tamagawa	January 10, 2026	TBA	TBA	Based on a light novel written by Hamuo.	
Arcanadea	Keiichiro Kawaguchi	January 2027	TBA	TBA	Based on a plastic model series created by Kotobukiya.	
Fungus and Iron	Keitaro Motonaga	TBA	TBA	TBA	Based on a manga written by Ayaka Katayama.	

=== ONAs ===
==== Series ====
Title	Director(s)	First run start date	First run end date	Eps	Note(s)	Ref.
Monster Strike 2nd Season	Takayuki Hamana	April 1, 2017	September 2, 2017	23	Sequel to Monster Strike.	
Monster Strike: The Fading Cosmos	Takayuki Hamana	October 7, 2017	January 6, 2018	13	Second part of Monster Strike 2nd Season.	
Miru Tights	Yuki Ogawa	May 11, 2019	July 27, 2019	12	Original work.	

==== Films ====
Title	Director(s)	Release date	Runtime	Note(s)	Ref.
Monster Strike: The Long Awaited Utopia	Takayuki Hamana	May 25, 2017	15 minutes	Spin-off and related to Monster Strike.	
Starlight Promises	Kazuya Murata	August 3, 2018	62 minutes	Original work. Co-produced with XFlag.	

=== OVAs ===
Title	Director(s)	Release date	Note(s)	Ref.
Miru Tights	Yuki Ogawa	August 23, 2019	Bonus episode bundled with the series' Blu-ray.	
