= Graphinica =

Japanese animation studio

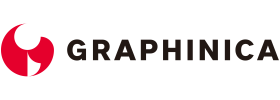
- Native name: 株式会社Graphinica
- Romanized name: Kabushiki-gaisha Gurafinika
- Type: Kabushiki-gaisha
- Industry: Japanese animation
- Founded: April 30, 2009; 17 years ago
- Headquarters: Kamiochiai, Shinjuku, Tokyo, Japan
- Key people: Nao Hirasawa (CEO); Motoko Fujikuro (Managing director); Norio Katou (Director); Tomokazu Iizumi (Note: Non-executive director (取締役（非常勤）).); Dai Horikoshi (N-E Director)
- Total equity: ¥ 20,000,000
- Number of employees: 280 (as of July 2024)
- Parent: Memory-Tech Holdings Inc. (100%); Q-TEC (formerly)
- Divisions: Graphinica Asagaya Studio; Graphinica Sapporo Studio; Graphinica Kyoto Studio; Graphinica Fukuoka Studio
- Subsidiaries: Yumeta Company; Flagship Line
- Website: www.graphinica.com

Graphinica Co., Ltd. (Japanese: 株式会社Graphinica, Hepburn: Kabushiki-gaisha Gurafinika), is a Japanese animation studio founded in April 2009, focused on 3DCG and 2D animation.

== History ==
The company was established on April 30, 2009, after studio Gonzo decided to sell its digital video division to Q-TEC, which then established the company with the resources acquired, along with 25 employees that worked with the previous company then became part of Graphinica, with an initial total of 60 employees when it was created.

On April 1, 2010, absorbed and merged Decoloco (an animation filming/VFX company) of Q-TEC group to the company. On April 1, 2011, it opened the Ogikubo Studio and started 2D drawing animation production.

On December 1, 2017, Graphinica's owner Memory-Tech Holdings announced that they have acquired AOI TYO Holdings' TYO Animations subsidiary, with the company then being put as a subsidiary of Graphinica after the acquisition. In addition, TYO Animations' name was changed to Yumeta Company, reviving a name that was retired in 2009 when the original Yumeta Company merged with Hal Film Maker to form TYO Animations.

On July 3, 2018, Graphinica and Avex Pictures announced that they have jointly established a new company called Flagship Line. According to the companies, the new company will produce anime, game, and VR content and "It will leverage the development and production capabilities of Graphinica, and the planning and operational architecture of Avex Pictures".

== Works ==
=== Television series ===
Title	Director(s)	First run start date	First run end date	Eps	Note(s)
Boku wa Ou-sama	Takashi Horiuchi	April 6, 2013	June 22, 2013	12	Based on the 1996 OVA by Nippon Animation.
Chain Chronicle ~Light of Haecceitas~	Masashi Kudō	January 8, 2017	March 25, 2017	12	Based on a video game by Sega. Co-animated with Telecom Animation Film.
Juni Taisen: Zodiac War	Naoto Hosoda	October 3, 2017	December 19, 2017	12	Adaptation of a light novel series written by Nisio Isin.
Re:Stage! Dream Days♪	Shin Katagai	July 7, 2019	September 29, 2019	12	Based on a multi-media franchise by Pony Canyon and Comptiq. Co-animated with Yumeta Company.
Muv-Luv Alternative	Yukio Nishimoto; Hiroyuki Taiga	October 7, 2021	December 23, 2021	12	Based on a visual novel by âge. Co-animated with Yumeta Company.
Cue!	Shin Katagai	January 8, 2022	June 25, 2022	24	Based on a smartphone game by Liber Entertainment. Co-animated with Yumeta Company.
Tokyo Mew Mew New	Takahiro Natori	July 6, 2022	September 21, 2022	12	Adaptation of a manga series written by Reiko Yoshida and Mia Ikumi. Co-animated with Yumeta Company.
Muv-Luv Alternative 2nd Season	Yukio Nishimoto; Hiroyuki Taiga	October 6, 2022	December 22, 2022	12	Sequel to Muv-Luv Alternative. Co-animated with Yumeta Company.
Legend of Mana: The Teardrop Crystal	Masato Jinbo	October 8, 2022	December 24, 2022	12	Based on an action RPG game by Square Enix. Co-animated with Yokohama Animation Laboratory.
Tokyo Mew Mew New 2nd Season	Takahiro Natori	April 5, 2023	June 21, 2023	12	Sequel to Tokyo Mew Mew New. Co-animated with Yumeta Company.

=== Films ===
Title	Director(s)	Release date	Note(s)
Expelled from Paradise	Seiji Mizushima	November 15, 2014	Original work.
Chain Chronicle ~Light of Haecceitas~	Masashi Kudō	December 3, 2016 – February 11, 2017	Based on a video game by Sega. Co-animated with Telecom Animation Film. Theatrical release of the TV series.
Hello World	Tomohiko Itō	September 20, 2019	Original work.

=== OVAs/ONAs ===
Title	Director(s)	Release date	Eps	Note(s)
Hellsing Ultimate	Yasuhiro Matsumura	July 27, 2011 – December 26, 2012	3	Based on a manga by Kouta Hirano. Episodes 8–10.
Hellsing: The Dawn		July 27, 2011 – December 26, 2012	3	Based on a manga by Kouta Hirano. Prequel to Hellsing Ultimate.
Wonder Momo	Yutaka Kagawa	February 6, 2014 – March 6, 2014	5	Adaptation of the webcomic by Erik Ko and Jim Zub, which was inspired by Bandai Namco's video game of the same name.
JAE: Yamaeloid	Takashi Horiuchi; Masahiro Emoto	January 23, 2015	1	Part of the Japan Animator Expo by Khara.
Another World	Tomohiko Itō	September 13, 2019 – October 4, 2019	3	Original work by Tomohiko Itō. Spin-off of the Hello World film.
Record of Ragnarok	Masao Ōkubo	June 17, 2021	12	Adaptation of a manga series written by Shinya Umemura and Takumi Fukui, and illustrated by Azychika.
Record of Ragnarok II	Masao Ōkubo	January 26, 2023 – July 12, 2023	15	Sequel to Record of Ragnarok. Co-animated with Yumeta Company.
Disney Twisted-Wonderland: The Animation – Episode of Heartslabyul	Takahiro Natori; Shin Katagai	October 29, 2025 – December 17, 2025	8	Based on a smartphone game by Aniplex and Walt Disney Japan. Co-animated with Yumeta Company.
Disney Twisted-Wonderland: The Animation – Episode of Savanaclaw	Takahiro Natori; Shin Katagai	December 23, 2026 – scheduled	8	Sequel to Disney Twisted-Wonderland: The Animation – Episode of Heartslabyul. Co-animated with Yumeta Company.

=== Video games ===
Title	Type	Publisher/Company	Release date	Notes
Xenoblade Chronicles	Video game	Nintendo, Monolith Soft	June 10, 2010	Animation and cutscenes
Xenoblade Chronicles X	Video game	Nintendo, Monolith Soft	April 29, 2015	Cutscenes and storyboards
Project X Zone 2	Video game	Bandai Namco Entertainment, Monolith Soft	November 12, 2015	Opening animation production directed by Yasutoshi Iwasaki
Xenoblade Chronicles 2	Video game	Nintendo, Monolith Soft	December 1, 2017	Cinematic direction by Hiroshi Shirai and Yusuke Kubo
Xenoblade Chronicles: Definitive Edition	Video game	Nintendo, Monolith Soft	May 29, 2020	Animation and cutscenes for Future Connected
Xenoblade Chronicles 3	Video game	Nintendo, Monolith Soft	July 29, 2023	Cinematic direction by Hiroshi Shirai and Yusuke Kubo
Xenoblade Chronicles X: Definitive Edition	Video game	Nintendo, Monolith Soft	March 20, 2025	Animation and cutscenes for content new to Definitive Edition
