= List of As a Reincarnated Aristocrat, I'll Use My Appraisal Skill to Rise in the World episodes =

Key visual of the first season

As a Reincarnated Aristocrat, I'll Use My Appraisal Skill to Rise in the World is an anime television series based on the a light novel series of the same name by Miraijin A. The story follow Ars Louvent, a salaryman who reincarnated in another world. He discovers that he also possesses the skill to appraise the talents and aptitudes of other people. With his special powers, Ars identifies and convinces powerful individuals who excel in various subjects.

The television series adaptation was announced on May 9, 2023. It is produced by Studio Mother and directed by Takao Katō, with scripts written by Yasuhiro Nakanishi, character designs handled by Yūko Yahiro, and music composed by Kujira Yumemi. The series aired from April 7 to June 23, 2024, on the brand new Agaru Anime programming block on all JNN affiliates, including CBC and TBS. The opening theme song is "Blue Days" (ブルーデイズ), performed by True, while the ending theme song is "Finally", performed by Kana Hanazawa. Crunchyroll streamed the series worldwide outside of East Asia. Medialink licensed the series in East (excluding China and Japan) and Southeast Asia for streaming on Ani-One Asia's YouTube channel.

Following the final episode of the first season, a second season was announced, which aired from September 29 to December 22 of the same year, on the same programming block. The opening theme song is "Skillawake" (Note: stylized in all-caps), performed by PassCode, while the ending theme song is "Familiar", performed by Yuki Tanaka.

Following the final episode of the second season, a third season was announced. Produced by GeyeG Pictures, the season premiered on September 27, 2026, on the same programming block. The opening theme song is "Still Water", performed by Rico Sasaki, while the ending theme song is "Hibi o Koete" (日々を越えて), performed by Akuruyo no Hitsuji.

== Series overview ==
Season	Episodes	Originally released	
Season	Episodes	First released	Last released
1	12	April 7, 2024	June 23, 2024
2	12	September 29, 2024	December 22, 2024
3	TBA	September 27, 2026	TBA

== Episodes ==
=== Season 1 ===
No. overall	No. in season	Title	Directed by (Note: Production staff information is taken from the ending credits of each episode.)	Written by	Storyboarded by	Original release date
1	1	"Reincarnation and Appraisal"; Transliteration: "Tensei to Kantei" (Japanese: 転生と鑑定)	Hiroaki Matsushima	Yasuhiro Nakanishi	Takao Katō	April 7, 2024
A Japanese salesman dies from overworking and is reborn in another world as Ars Louvent, the heir to House Louvent which rules over the town of Lamberk. He also discovers that he possesses the ability to appraise other individuals and measure their talents. Three years later, he convinces a soldier who isn't good at handling a spear to take up archery instead, which he in turn is very skilled at. He later finds an orphan named Ritsu Muses being mistreated by the villagers due to his race and takes him in, demanding that his servants treat him with respect. Ars's father Raven agrees to let him stay if he can beat him in a mock duel. With some help from Ars, Ritsu manages to win the fight and he officially becomes Ars's retainer.
2	2	"Above and Below"; Transliteration: "Ue to Shita" (Japanese: 上と下)	Masato Takeuchi	Yasuhiro Nakanishi	Takao Katō	April 14, 2024
While learning about the conflicting war in their region, Ars is sent to find someone who can use magic for Raven's army. During his search, Ars feels pity for the poor and homeless, but Ritsu convinces him that he cannot help them at this point. A girl steals Ars's money and they chase her down, defeating some slave traders who are after her, as they intend to sell her into slavery after they caught her trying to steal from them. The girl introduces herself as Charlotte Wraith. Realizing that she can use magic, they invite her to become Ars's second retainer, but she declines as she is concerned about the homeless kids. Sometime later, the homeless kids inform them that Charlotte has been captured by the same slave traders from before.
3	3	"Answer"; Transliteration: "Kotae" (Japanese: 答え)	Natsumi Uchinuma	Yasuhiro Nakanishi	Natsumi Uchinuma	April 21, 2024
Ars and Ritsu follow the slave traders to their lair and after Ritsu defeats them, Ars offers to buy Charlotte from them. After some bribing, their leader Albert reluctantly agrees to sell her to them. Learning of Ars's plan to create a peaceful town for everyone to be happy in, Charlotte finally accepts Ars's offer and after Ritsu gives her a pendent that he found earlier, shows off her magic skills. Raven also accepts her as Ars's retainer.
4	4	"Where Talent Dwells"; Transliteration: "Sainō no Ibasho" (Japanese: 才能の居場所)	Kazuya Fujishiro	Yasuhiro Nakanishi	Takao Katō	April 28, 2024
Three years later, the war is still going on and Raven's army has scored many victories thanks to Charlotte, who has now become a powerful mage. At this time, Ars now has two younger siblings. Ars, Ritsu, and Charlotte search for a group of talented hunters to recruit them. Charlotte is then revealed to have feelings for Ars. They meet the hunters and invite them to be soldiers. Ars also meets their timid younger brother Rosell, who reluctantly goes with his brothers to Ars's mansion. In the library, they learn that Rosell has skilled knowledge. After some convincing from his father and brothers, he finally agrees to join Ars.
5	5	"The Storm Arrives!"; Transliteration: "Arashi, Kuru!" (Japanese: 嵐、来る！)	Hiroaki Matsushima	Daisuke Ōhigashi	Tomoko Iwasaki	May 5, 2024
Raven grows ill from the war and Ars learns that he has an arranged bride, who is a girl named Lysia Pleid. Reading her, Ars realizes how devious she can be, but pretends to be oblivious to this. After they spend the day together, Lysia soon truly begins to develop feelings for Ars, who in response tells her about his skills. Charlotte secretly grows jealous of Lysia. The next day, Lysia heads home, having decided to marry Ars after all in the future. Ars remains in contact with her via letters.
6	6	"The Face of a Warrior"; Transliteration: "Senshi no Kao" (Japanese: 戦士の顔)	Masahiro Hosoda	Makoto Oyama	Natsumi Uchinuma	May 12, 2024
As Raven's illness grows worse, he learns of an assassination. Ars attends a meeting with the nobles alongside his subordinates regarding the war and the murder. Lysia's father, who also attended the meeting, approves of his future marriage to his daughter. Concerned of his father, Ars becomes determined to help by training hard. However, Raven warns him that he is not cut out for fighting in the war yet. He is traumatized after a war criminal is beheaded in front of him. Raven then prepares to engage the enemy, bringing Ritsu, Charlotte, and Rosell along.
7	7	"Succession"; Transliteration: "Keishō" (Japanese: 継承)	Toshiyuki Kōno	Yasuhiro Nakanishi	Takao Katō	May 19, 2024
Raven's army once again emerges victorious, but his illness has worsened again upon returning home. Meanwhile, Ars is still training so he can be involved in the war. Lysia returns and Ritsu, Charlotte, and Rosell inform her of Ars's pain. Raven later calls the four to his room and requests for them help Ars. After spending the night with his family, Raven dies from his illness. Ars officially becomes the head of House Louvent while Ritsu, Charlotte, Rosell, and Lysia recall their times with Raven. A woman with purple eyes hears about the assassination.
8	8	"A New Generation"; Transliteration: "Shinsedai" (Japanese: 新世代)	Kazuya Fujishiro	Daisuke Ōhigashi	Takao Katō	May 26, 2024
Three months after Raven's death, Ars announces to the nobles that he is now House Louvant's new lord. Continuing the fight in the war, Ars learns of a band of mercenaries called Shadow who can help them get information on their enemies. They visit an orphanage that Ars built to shelter the homeless kids from earlier, who lives have now improved for the better. Lysia also meets up with them again. That night, after some competition between Lysia and Charlotte, Ars and Rosell end up sleeping with them, although the boys fail to get any sleep. The next day, the group head to the bar that Shadow owns where they have a confrontation with their leader Fahm, who was previously disguised as a waitress. Ars also tells her about his skills after she demands how he knew her true identity. After some convincing, Fahm agrees to get them the information they need.
9	9	"Sounding Out"; Transliteration: "Saguri Ai" (Japanese: 探り合い)	Masato Takeuchi	Daisuke Ōhigashi	Masato Takeuchi	June 2, 2024
After getting the required information from Fahm, who is revealed to be a man disguised as a girl, Ars informs the nobles of what he learned. They then go to inform the Perena County's leader that he has been duped by their enemies. Negotiations nearly turn rough, but the county chief of Massa reveals himself, having decided to come along with Ars. Now aware of the truth, the chief of Perena agrees to ally with them. Visiting his father's grave, Ars is grateful of Ritsu, Charlotte, and Rosell for being supportive of him while two other nobles also visit Raven's grave to honor him. Ars meets Lord Couran.
10	10	"Couran Salamakhia"; Transliteration: "Kuran Saremakia" (Japanese: クラン・サレマキア)	Masahiro Hosoda	Makoto Oyama	Natsumi Uchinuma	June 9, 2024
Ars and his subordinates are invited to Lord Couran's party, though Charlotte gets left behind. Once there, Ars sees how high his stats are, but also suspects something is amiss. Couran announces his desire to create independence and expresses gratitude to Ars for his heroic efforts. Couran later has a private talk with Ars regarding their subordinates and also decides to make him Canarre's headman. Afterwards, Ars is invited to a meeting and tasked to look for more talented people, to which Couran reveals that he knows of his abilities. Ars hires Fam to help them. A drunk girl named Mirelle later gets a job at Fam's bar. She later shares information with Fam, who in turn has her stay with Ars. Meanwhile, Couran's brother Vasmarque is preparing to make his next move to capture Mirelle.
11	11	"Mireille Grangeon"; Transliteration: "Mirēyu Guranjion" (Japanese: ミレーユ・グランジオン)	Hiroaki Matsushima	Yasuhiro Nakanishi	Hiroaki Matsushima & Takao Katō	June 16, 2024
Ritsu is skeptical of letting Mirelle stay because of her infamous history, but Ars agrees to allow her to stay. Mirelle is disliked by most of the subordinates (except for Charlotte) due to her incompetence, so they decide to settle things in a mock battle. Most of the soldiers join Ritsu, while Ars is partnered with Mirelle. During the fight, a mage working for Mirelle informs Ritsu of her plan, but the soldiers discover his ruse. Mirelle reveals her intelligence by tricking Ritsu's team into attacking decoy targets before leading them to chase her carrying Ars.
12	12	"Oath"; Transliteration: "Chikai" (Japanese: 誓い)	Toshiyuki Kōno	Yasuhiro Nakanishi	Takao Katō	June 23, 2024
As the group chase after Mirelle and Ars, she manages to lead them into some traps that she set earlier. Lysia watches the group from the distance along with the other servants. Meanwhile, the rookie soldiers are able to outsmart Ritsu's team, prompting Charlotte and Rosell to run, though the former accidentally knocks herself out. Mirelle proceeds to go after Rosell with Ritsu right behind her. In the end, Mirelle's team wins the mock battle. The subordinates finally accept Mirelle and Ars explains his goal to her. She then suggests that he should become the next emperor, which makes him nervous. The group then have a party to celebrate Mirelle's victory in the mock battle. The next day, as Lysia leaves, Ars receives a letter from Lord Couran and his subordinates all decide to go with him.

=== Season 2 ===
No. overall	No. in season	Title	Directed by	Written by	Storyboarded by	Original release date
13	1	"Promise"; Transliteration: "Yakusoku" (Japanese: 約束)	Takao Katō	Yasuhiro Nakanishi	Takao Katō	September 29, 2024
The episode begins with a recap of the first season. Ars and his subordinates are on their way to see Lord Couran. Along the way, they stop at a beach, but are forced to leave after disturbing the owner. After arriving at Couran's castle, Couran's subordinates are highly doubtful of Ars's group, especially Mirelle, but Couran is very supportive of them. They then discuss a plan to deal with the enemy forces with Mirelle and Rosell's help. After their scheme is put in motion, Ars visits Lysia for advice on the war. As Ars and Lysia spend time with each other and after they confess their feelings, they both ask each other to marry. Everyone is shocked to hear that, but nevertheless approve of their decision. Fahm delivers information on the imperial family as Ars forms a plan to win over the minister.
14	2	"Negotiations"; Transliteration: "Kōshō" (Japanese: 交渉)	Tonomi Mikawa	Makoto Koyama	Takao Katō	October 6, 2024
After becoming engaged to Lysia, Ars explains his plan to negotiate with the minister to his subordinates. Charlotte expresses further jealousy of Lysia's engagement to Ars, but he requests for her to be their escort. As the group travel to the Paradille kingdom, they meet up with Fahm, who provides them with vital information on the enemy nation, who has joined forces with another nation. Ars discovers that Lysia has kept textbooks with her as a sign of their love. They later meet Couran's son Lenge, who displays great pride. Ars reads his abilities and tells Couran about it. Ars, Charlotte and Lysia later go shopping before boarding a ship. Lenge also joins the group on their mission. They rescue some men along the way, but they are revealed to be pirates who try to take their valuables using Charlotte as a hostage, but she overpowers them. However, they learn that the pirates are actually fishermen who are poor and their families are living in poverty. Ars decides to loan them some money despite Lenge wanting to punish them instead. They reach the capital, but see how some people are rich and some are poor. The next day, Lysia wears a pretty dress as they visit the minister. Through a plan that Lysia thought of earlier, she bargains with the minister and nearly succeeds, but Lenge ruins it at the last second with his arrogance and unwillingness to lie. Having also planned for this, Lysia offers her dress and jewelry to the minister, which he accepts and finally agrees to ally, but is somewhat cautious of Couran due to Lenge's behavior. Everyone is pleased that the negotiations were successful.
15	3	"The Image of a Lord"; Transliteration: "Ryōshu no Sugata" (Japanese: 領主の姿)	Masato Takeuchi	Makoto Koyama	Masato Takeuchi	October 13, 2024
Lysia reveals that Lenge exposing the truth was also part of her plan to bribe the minister. Lenge believes that using trickery to their advantage is wrong. However, when Lumiere tells Lenge that what Ars and Lysia did was necessary because they are not at the same level as him, he comes around realizing that he was the fool and decides to help Lysia after all. They eventually complete their negotiations with Paradille with Lenge's help. After returning to the Couran's castle, they inform Couran of their progress, but he is displeased with Lenge for joining Ars without letting him know and for his foolish actions. He then rewards Ars with a large amount of gold. When Ars grows fearful of the upcoming war, Charlotte promises to support him, with Lysia also promising to help too. Ars returns home and reunites with his subordinates. While shopping with Lysia, the villagers grow worried about Ars and provide him with a large supply of food. Ars visits his father's grave along with his subordinates to give their blessings to him. The next day, while Lysia remains behind to watch the estate, Ars and Couran prepare for battle against the enemy with a large army of soldiers and Ars's subordinates.
16	4	"Fort Vakmarko"; Transliteration: "Wakumakuro Toride" (Japanese: ワクマクロ砦)	Katsumi Minoguchi	Makoto Koyama	Natsumi Uchinuma	October 20, 2024
While approaching the enemy territory, Ars grows nervous, but his subordinates support him. They prepare to launch an attack on one of the enemy bases, but are surprised when the enemy suddenly surrenders seeing that they are outnumbered. Meanwhile, at Castle Samkh, Vasmarque's right-hand man Thomas Grangeon (Mirelle's younger brother), who possesses great strength, prepares to make his next move against Ars's forces with Fraedor, Vandol and her daughter Selena, who is also a mage. Ars forms a plan to take control of the three fortresses surrounding Castle Samkh. They start their attack on the first fortress: Fort Vakmarko. Selena creates a forcefield around the fortress while Charlotte and her mages attempt to break through it, with some difficulties due to the forcefield's self-repairing magic. After discovering that powerful enemy forces are behind them, making retreat not possible, Ars has Ritsu lead an army to deal with them. He manages to defeat the enemy soldiers with ease. When Selena boosts her magic on the forcefield, Charlotte decides to use all the magic that she and the other mages have despite the risk of doing this. Charlotte's magic eventually overpowers Selena's and destroys the forcefield, but this wears her out. The group then continue their plan to take the fortresses and Castle Samkh.
17	5	"Taking Castle Samkh"; Transliteration: "Samuku-jō Kōryaku" (Japanese: サムク城攻略)	Hiroaki Matsushima	Makoto Koyama	Hiroaki Matsushima	November 3, 2024 (Note: The episode was delayed for one week due to scheduling.)
Thomas and Vandol learn of Fort Vakmarko's defeat. After Ars's forces capture the enemy soldiers, Couran plans to kill them due to it not being wise to keep them alive, including Selena. Against this, Ars attempts to convince Couran not to. Following Rosell's advice, they then get the idea to spare those who are willing to help them while using those who refuse to as hostages. Selena is skeptical of allying with Ars due to her status as a lord, but after a talk with Charlotte, she is sent to ask if her father is willing to join too. That night, Fahm arrives with news: Castle Samkh has stronger defenses and warns them about Thomas. After Selena returns to her father, she expects to be punished for her failure, but he is grateful that she's alright. The next day, Ars begins his attack on Castle Samkh and manages to get past an indestructible gate with the help of Fahm and his men. The hostage exchange forces the castle's troops to surrender. A flashback then reveals that Selena was unhappy when Vandol's personality changed upon entering the war, which led her to also join. Thomas plans to use explosion magic to ensure their victory by pretending to surrender so to lure Ars's forces into the castle so he can trigger the trap, though it will require sacrificing those that are also in the castle. Unwilling to murder innocent people, they refuse the plan and destroy the detonator, defecting from Vasmarque's army. A soldier attacks them in retaliation, and although Selena tries to protect her father, he manages to step in and stop them. They then decide to join Ars's army after being spared from punishment. Meanwhile, Thomas, although displeased with Vandol and Selena's betrayal, reveals to have another detonator and activates the castle bombs to wipe out Ars's army, but the explosion happens in a different location, rendering it completely harmless. It turns out Fahm secretly moved the explosives beforehand due to Rosell suspecting something off about the attack. Although he is upset for putting Fahm in danger and not telling Ars about this earlier, Mirelle cheers him up. With Selena and Vandol now part of their group, they continue the war against Vasmarque.
18	6	"Evolution"; Transliteration: "Shinka" (Japanese: 進化)	Teng Fu	Daisuke О̄higashi	Tomoko Iwasaki	November 10, 2024
Lysia is pleased to learn that Ars has succeeded in conquering one of the enemy castles. The army decides to rest for a while before resuming the war. While out shopping, Ars buys a wind up toy egg with a small mechanical bird. As they prepare to take over the remaining two enemy castles, Ars learns that Ruper Louston, a lord from one of the enemy castles, is requesting a negotiation. He, Ritsu, and Mirelle head there, but are greeted with hostility. Under Mirelle's advice, Ars makes everyone drop their weapons and they are allowed in. After Ars drops the toy egg, it releases the mechanical bird, which flies around the room; this causes Ruper to develop a change of emotion. The negotiation is discovered to be a trap, but Ars, after reading Ruper with his powers, learns that he is being blackmailed into helping Vasmarque and that his pregnant wife is being held hostage in the other enemy castle. Ars then makes a deal: he will rescue Ruper's wife and in exchange, he will ally with Ars's army. Despite the dangers of doing this, Ruper agrees.
19	7	"The Threat of Castle Rolto"; Transliteration: "Roruto-jō no Kyōi" (Japanese: ロルト城の脅威)	Koichi Tamura	Daisuke О̄higashi	Natsumi Uchinuma	November 17, 2024
Ars and his subordinates begin their plan to rescue Ruper's wife. A warrior named Clamant Maitraw then arrives to help. He is the leader of a company consisting of combat mercenaries that Ritsu knows of. However, Clamant is neutral in the situation and only works for money, but is nevertheless willing to aid them. The rescue plan is then put into motion. Meanwhile, at Castle Rolto, Lord Jean assumes that he is on the verge of victory. He receives a blood-stained letter from Ruper (who forged it on Ars's orders) warning them that Ars's forces are targeting Rolto and that a mage is helping them. The next day, the battle between Ars and Rolto's army begins. Dan, the leader of the enemy army, proves to be a strong fighter. Fahm rescues the hostages from Rolto before they can be transferred. At this point, Ars's army retreats with the enemy soldiers in pursuit, but Jean discovers that the retreat is a ruse and joins the fight. Flashbacks reveals that Jean killed Dan's father to become a noble. Dan and Jean catch up with Ars's army and easily kill the soldiers. Deciding not to ask Clamant for help, Ars opts to continue with their original plan despite it backfiring. Dan surprises Ars, but Ritsu saves him and fights off Dan. Enemy soldiers appear in front of Ars, but they attack the other enemy soldiers instead of Ars's army. They are actually Ruper and his soldiers, who have come to help. As the enemy soldiers fall back, Dan shoots Ruper with an arrow in retaliation for his betrayal, but he survives. Rolto is now aware of Ruper's treason and Dan orders the hostages to be killed, but discovers that they have escaped and, realizing that there are spies in the castle, initiates a manhunt for them.
20	8	"Family"; Transliteration: "Kazoku" (Japanese: 家族)	Takao Katō	Daisuke О̄higashi	Takao Katō	November 24, 2024
Ars and his army continue to run from the enemy forces while Shadow hides from Jean's men, forcing them to take another route, but Ruper's wife goes into labor. They manage to narrowly avoid being spotted by the guards. Meanwhile, Ars's army has made it to the forest, but they figure that Jean was aware of their ploy. Jean decides to return to the castle as he knows of the trap that Ars has arranged, but most of his men disobey him and go after Ars's army. When Dan also decides to go after Ars, Jean is left no choice but to follow, but they are unaware that Mireille is disguised as one of the enemy soldiers as part of her and Rosell's earlier plan. They meet up with Clamant's men, who are prepared to face Jean's forces. The enemy soldiers are easily defeated while Mireille and Charlotte reunite with Ars. Dan manages to get through Clamant's forces, and Ritsu fights him one on one. Ritsu is overwhelmed, but manages to outsmart and defeat Dan. Jean arrives, but Clamant easily defeats him. As a result, the enemy soldiers are forced to surrender. Upset by his defeat, Dan attempts to commit suicide, but is stopped by Jean, who still considers him a faithful ally before they are taken prisoner. However, Ruper begins to die from his wound, but he miraculously recovers when his wife arrives along with Fahm and her newborn baby. Ruper is reunited with his wife and child. A funeral is held for the soldiers who died in battle. While celebrating their victory, Ars laments losing his soldiers during war and he and Ritsu send letters to the dead soldiers' families.
21	9	"The Shadow's Future"; Transliteration: "Kage no Mirai" (Japanese: 影の未来)	Hiroaki Matsushima	Daisuke О̄higashi	Hiroaki Matsushima	December 1, 2024
Following Rolto's defeat and capture, Fahm is unhappy that his payment didn't meet his demands, so Ars promises to fix it. Fahm returns to camp, but finds it attacked. In another enemy castle, it is revealed that Thomas is responsible for the attack, to which he intends to weaken Ars's forces by destroying their supplies. Thomas explains to the castle's lord that he plans to target Couran himself. Ars and his subordinates deduce Thomas's involvement in the ambush and Mirelle sends Fahm to help Couran as it begins to rain, which is actually a spell that Thomas's forces will use for magic attacks. Thomas ambushes Couran, but Fahm rescues him with his shadow magic. Thomas chases after them, but Fahm hinders him with his magic. Though Thomas manages to defend himself against Fahm's attacks, he is forced to retreat upon learning that Couran is long gone. Though Couran intends to pay Shadow for their help, they decline it as it was Ars who hired them in the first place. Recalling his past, Fahm returns to Ars and offers to be his retainer, to which Ars accepts. Meanwhile, back at the enemy castle, a red-haired warrior wielding a heavy axe that only he can use prepares to make his move.
22	10	"Snowball Fight"; Transliteration: "Yuki Gassen" (Japanese: 雪合戦)	Katsumi Minoguchi	Daisuke О̄higashi	Tomoko Iwasaki	December 8, 2024
Ars and his friends continue to the enemy castle. Charlotte uses her magic to deflect oncoming flaming arrows and open a way inside. As the battle carries on, Ars's forces are slowly winning, forcing the enemy soldiers to surrender. Braham, the red-haired warrior from the previous episode, appears and attacks both Ritsu and the enemy soldiers after they insult him. Ritsu manages to defeat Braham due to the latter relying more on brute strength than intelligence. After Ars reads Braham with his powers, Braham asks for Ritsu to be his teacher, who reluctantly agrees as Ars allows Braham to join his team. Mirelle then forces the enemy soldiers to reveal their traps and troop positions in the castle and Clamant helps disable the traps, allowing Ars's forces to conquer it, forcing its lord to flee. Couran is grateful that Ars helped to take down the enemy territories, but is curious about Ars's power after he reveals it to Couran. Later, Ars and his friends get into a snowball fight along with other activates. Fahm disappears to avoid the wrath of an angry crowd as a result of them wanting their money back after betting over which team will win the snowball fight as a result of it ending in a draw. Meanwhile, Thomas, frustrated that his sister has been thwarting his every moves, is confronted by Vasmarque.
23	11	"Allegiance"; Transliteration: "Chūsei" (Japanese: 忠誠)	Motohiko Niwa	Makoto Koyama	Takao Katō	December 15, 2024
A flashback reveals Mirelle and Thomas's childhood. When they were kids, Mirelle always had the advantage over Thomas, which tore their relationship apart as Thomas strived to outsmart his sister. During adulthood, Mirelle was banished from the enemy domain and Thomas began serving its lord. Returning to the present, Vasmarque figures that Mirelle has allied with Couran's army, but still considers Thomas a faithful ally as they make it their goal to kill Couran. Meanwhile, Couran speaks with Ars's group regarding his confrontation with Thomas. He is then approached by a messenger who requests a truce from one of the enemy lords, but also reveals a large deadly weapon that can instantly destroy surrounding areas for miles. Ars and his allies suspect this to be a trick. Another flashback reveals that Mirelle and Thomas's father was murdered after he was branded a traitor and allows for his children to be murdered too due to their dangerous capabilities, although they were instead thrown out into the streets and eventually became strategists; Mirelle shares her backstory with the rest of Ars's group at Rosell's urging. Thomas prepares for his next attack against Couran's army and hopes to defeat Mirelle. Once Couran and the others learn that the weapon has been spotted, Ars sends Fahm to investigate and he discovers that it is fake. The truce offer was just a ploy to buy more time to strengthen the main enemy base. Recalling the mock battle from before, they deduce that Thomas's plan was to get close without attracting attention. However, Thomas had known that they would figure out his decoy plan and send their soldiers into the forest that he is hiding in, having installed explosive devices that will detonate when they come in contact with flames, thereby wiping out Couran's forces instead. However, he again intends to make sacrifices to ensure their success, which worries the enemy soldiers. Thomas then recalls more of his past, which includes his loyalty to Vasmarque. Despite the risk, all the soldiers choose to stay with Thomas, agreeing to sacrifice themselves to win the war just as Couran's army arrives at the forest.
24	12	"Entrusted Feelings"; Transliteration: "Takusareru Omoi" (Japanese: 託される想い)	Toshiyuki Kōno	Yasuhiro Nakanishi	Toshiyuki Kōno	December 22, 2024
Couran's army prepares to battle Thomas, unaware of the bombs in the forest. As Charlotte and her mages prepare to fire, a suspicious Rosell stops them and instead has them launch a fireball over Thomas's army to distract them as Braham, Clamant, and Fahm ambush the enemy soldiers. Thomas charges at Couran, but Ars tries to take him on instead. Ritsu comes to his aid and manages to defeat Thomas, but only temporally. Eventually, Thomas's forces are beaten as Mirelle approaches her brother while Ritsu scolds Ars for his recklessness. Mirelle explains to Thomas that it was Rosell who saw through his plan, not her. After using his evolved appraisal skill, Ars convinces Mirelle to express her true thoughts to Thomas: she is impressed, but also pleased that he managed to finally outsmart her for the first time. In turn, Thomas surrenders and is taken to prison as he is still loyal to Vasmarque. This allows Couran to capture the last of the enemy territory. Ruper is appointed as a new headman for one of the captured districts, while Ars is given his own district to rule. However, some of the servants are doubtful as they believe Ars is too young for the job, but Krall and Hammond come to his defense, along with Ars's allies. That night, Ars speaks with Lumeire regarding their success. The next day, Ars visits Lysia and receives a warm welcome from the villagers. Lysia and Ars's family all come out to greet him. A wedding ceremony is then held for Ars and Lysia.

=== Season 3 ===
No. overall	No. in season	Title	Directed by	Written by	Storyboarded by	Original release date
25	1	"Headman"; Transliteration: "Gunchō" (Japanese: 郡長)	Koichi Tamura	Daisuke Ōhigashi	Takao Katō	September 28, 2026 (Note: This episode aired at midnight JST, 30 minutes after the regular air time on JNN.)
Following a recap of past events, Vasmarque learns of Thomas's capture and his army's defeat. He decides to investigate. Meanwhile, Ars and his allies move into a castle in Canarre. Ars also decides to make Mirelle the lord of Lamberg. They proceed to hire new recruits. Zat Brozd, a former bounty hunter and mercenary, turns down the job offer as he doesn't like working for Ars due to his young age. Braham then challenges Zat to a fight and should Zat lose, he must reconsider. Braham wins the fight and Zat agrees to be Braham's vice-captain, albeit reluctantly. Ars's group next meet a mage named Musha Trick, who is quite cowardly and insecure, but after Charlotte helps her out, she agrees to join as Charlotte's assistant. Ars and Ritsu then go to see Lysia, who shows them some letters. One letter reveals that an inventor named Shin Seymarrow accidentally destroyed a warehouse at the Louvent estate, to the anger of the butler Krantz. Ars struggles to keep up with the overwhelming work and he goes for a walk in the city with Ritsu, Charlotte, and Lysia where they discover that people are still living in poverty due to lack of work. Ars decides to resolve this problem by helping the homeless people get jobs and turn Canarre into a loving place. Later, Ars learns that Mirelle has succeeded in her role as Lamberg's lord and Rosell becomes her servant. They then learn that an army led by Vasmarque is approaching Canarre.
26	2	"Crisis in Canarre"	Unknown	Unknown	TBA	October 5, 2026
Vasmarque forms an alliance with Grenda Domatheson, the governor of Seitz, who sends his right hand Borotz to lock down Canarre. Grenda is also after something in Canarre, but won't reveal to Vasmarque what it is, while Vasmarque reveals that he merely wishes to protect his lands. Though Borotz is concerned about the plan, Grenda warns him about Ars, which is what he is after. Meanwhile, Ars learns more about Seitz's history and Fahm arrives and reveals how big the approaching army is, also learning of Vasmarque's allegiance to Grenda. Ars realizes that they may not stand a chance and when Fahm suggests surrendering, Ars refuses and still intends to fight back. After a week, Couran sends a large army, Clamant, Hammond, and Mirelle to help him and the group put their plan in motion while Lysia watches over Canarre in their absence. Ars and his allies head off to confront Seitz's army. After Musha receives a letter from her mother, who believes that Musha is not cut out for war, she speaks to Charlotte, who accepts her regardless. The battle begins at the Coumeire River against the enemy soldiers led by Lantorque Lodder. Musha still doubts herself, but after some persuading from Charlotte, she cuts her hair and is able to help Ars's army by stopping up the river, giving them the advantage. Lantorque and his army are eventually forced to retreat.
27	3	"Zaht and Braham"	Unknown	Unknown	TBA	October 12, 2026
Musha is getting better with her magic as the group set up camp, but this makes Borotz more interested in Canarre. Borotz uses deer to find a safer way across the river and has Lantorque prepare for the next attack. Following a second battle, Ritsu's group is eventually forced to retreat. Braham convinces Ritsu to let him hold off the enemy soldiers, and he and Zat save Musha from being killed by one of the enemy soldiers. He and Zat manage to kill all the enemy soldiers, only for another squad to appear, forcing them to retreat. Braham stays behind to hold off the enemy soldiers. A flashback shows Braham learning about his family legacy from his father and older brother during a war and is given his father's axe. His father and older brother were seemly killed during combat, but he still believes that they are still alive and is waiting for them to return. He eventually decided to become a warrior in hopes for his father and brother to return. Returning to the present, Zat saves Braham, urging him to not give up so easily as they continue their getaway and the enemy soldiers stop pursuing them. Zat then recalls his own past where he intended to gain money to help his sick son, but his son passed away before that can happen. Ars is glad that things went well despite Ritsu's army being forced to retreat as he prepares for a counterattack.
28	4	"End of Hostilities"	Unknown	Unknown	TBA	October 19, 2026
As Ars's group begin planning a counterattack following the loss of their encampment, Fahm spies on the enemy forces and sees a way to weaken their advantages. Meanwhile, in a bar, a Seitz army official named Caesus Lopard is approached by a woman, revealed to be Fahm in disguise, who subdues Lopard. Back at Seitz's castle, Robert Brandoll, the army head, is unhappy with Lopard for storing away their supplies due to Shadow being in their area, but soon agrees with it, unaware that Fahm overheard them. It is then revealed that Lopard is actually one of Fahm's men in disguise, and Fahm proceeds to steal Seitz's aqua magia and deliver them to Ars, who is grateful of Fahm. Mirelle warns them to take action right away as Seitz might acquire a new set of supplies soon. After Borotz learns of the theft, Ars's group launch an attack from the distance with the help of Shin and his inventions along with the stolen aqua magia. This forces Borotz to retreat, but he then notices that the river's water level is low, having been blocked up by Musha, who then removes the barricade, cutting off most of the enemy soldiers. The battle then begins. Ars and Borotz are both injured after striking each other, but they survive. The war ends with Ars's army winning. While retreating, Borotz sees how powerful Ars is.
29	5	"The End of Vasmarque"	TBA	TBA	TBA	October 26, 2026
Grenda and Borotz have no choice but to form a peace treaty with Ars's nation while Couran approaches Vasmarque's domain. Vasmarque refuses to surrender and a battle breaks out. Couran eventually makes it pass the defenses with Lenge's help and he and Vasmarque fight, but his subordinate Kanses Bandol springs an explosive trap in an attempt to defeat Couran, but this fails and Kanses gets killed instead, forcing Vasmarque to surrender and at last ending the war. Ars's group travel to the capital city of Arcantez. In the castle, he meets Lenge, who introduces him to other nobles as Couran celebrates their victory and appoints Lenge as a lord. Couran also plans to execute Vasmarque for his betrayal. Despite having discomfort over watching this, Ars doesn't leave. Vasmarque warns everyone that Couran is the true criminal and the nation will fall if he rules before his execution. Couran later talks to Ars regarding Lenge before questioning him about war and explains why wars were happening in the first place. He became duke to stop these conflicts, yet wars cannot be avoided as they are caused to gain permanent peace. Ars talks to his allies about this and they suggest having him become emperor to stop these wars for good.
30	6	"Fujimiya"	TBA	TBA	TBA	November 2, 2026
Ars heads to Lamberg to meet up with Shin, hoping that his inventions will make a difference, and explains his plan to become a lord with Shin's aid. Shin agrees and begins making plans to build an airship for Ars. Meanwhile, a group of knights are ambushed by invisible bandits. After returning to Canarre, Ars learns about the attack from the invisible bandits and plans to deal with this. Later, a group of travelers: Maika, Takao and Rikuya Fujimiya, are being accused by knights of being in league with the bandits before Ars and Ritsu arrive. Takeo fights Ritsu before Rikuya stops him. Maika is convinced by Rikuya that Ars is not dangerous before Ars wonders where they came from and convinces the knights that they are not working for the bandits. However, the three proceed to leave, but Ars and Ritsu follow them as they still wish to talk. At an inn, Ars and Ritsu learn more about the Fujimiyas background and that Rikuya is really the king of his country Yoh. There was also an uprising that occurred in Yoh, which drove the Fujimiya's out of their home, but assassins may have been sent to hunt them down. Rikuya also cannot sell his sword as Maika suggested as it is needed to symbolize his legacy. Ars agrees to help them and intends to provide them with a meal, but the invisible bandits suddenly arrive at the inn. Ritsu and Takao defeat them, but Ars and Rikuya are taken hostage, forcing the group to surrender, and they are imprisoned in the bandits' hideout. The bandits plan to sell them into slave labor. Ars and Ritsu pretend to be merchants to keep the bandits from recognizing them. Ars's allies learn of his capture and the invisible bandits. Lysia takes command and plans to rescue Ars and deal with the bandits.
31	7	"Off to Save Ars"	TBA	TBA	TBA	November 9, 2026
Lysia plans the rescue mission and Thomas arrives, having been recruited by Mirelle to help. Zaht and Braham, who are assigned for the mission, grow nervous of Lysia's demeaner behavior. They and Thomas begin their search for the bandits. Reaching the hideout, they discover that the bandits originally worked for Seitz and steel is their valuable resource. Thomas is aware that the bandits will flee and burn the place down if they barge in, so Zaht attempts to sneak in disguised as a bandit, claiming that he knew Georg, a known bandit boss. Meanwhile, Ars questions Rikuya about his sword and he further explains his past, revealing that he wasn't intended to be king in the first place. After his older brothers and father were killed in an attack by traitorous retainers, he was given the sword and tasked with becoming king to retake Yoh. He and his siblings escaped the attack, which left the city in ruins. Their mother was also kidnapped and married off to an usurper. They traveled the world to seek help in reclaiming their kingdom. After sharing his story, the leader of the bandits, revealed to be Vigo, a Seitz soldier who survived the battle at Coumeire River, arrives to interrogate them with torture, suspecting that they were lying about who they were and knows who Ars and Ritsu really are. He plans to extract revenge on them for his defeat in the previous battle and their lying. Ars refuses to be broken.
32	8	"What a King Needs"	TBA	TBA	TBA	November 16, 2026
Vigo is interrupted when he learns of an attack and leaves his men to watch the captives, but they manage to free themselves and escape as Rikuya recovers his sword. Sometime earlier, Thomas gave Zaht some explosives that he planted in the hideout and rescues Maika and Takao, but they are discovered and cornered. Vigo arrives and overpowers Zaht and Takao. Zaht then detonates the explosives, allowing Braham and Thomas to infiltrate the hideout. Ars, Ritsu, and Rikuya arrive and defeat Vigo. As a final ploy, Vigo tries to kill them by bringing the whole fortress down. The group and the bandits run for it, but Rikuya drops his sword into a ravine while Maiko and Takeo are separated from the others. Rikuya chooses to help his siblings instead of recovering the sword as they escape the fortress. The group manage to recover the sword from the remains of the fortress while the bandits are captured. Back at Canarre's castle, Ars is grateful of the Fujimiyas for their help. The Fujimiyas express their own graduate as Rikuya now has the confidence to become Yoh's next king, also wishing to serve Ars until the day they return to Yoh to rebuild the kingdom; Ars agrees. Ars then learns of how Lysia interrogated Vigo and finds her methods scary.
33	9	"Years of Feelings"	TBA	TBA	TBA	November 23, 2026
Ars and his allies suspect that someone is manipulating Vigo and wants Ars dead. Ars tries to identity Canerre's people to see if there's an assassin among them. Ars identifies a woman named Enan Rueges, who is actually quite skilled and decides to have her help Shin. Enan cannot speak and communicates by writing. Ars does not see her as an assassin, but Charlotte and Lysia are still wary of her as she isn't a noble. Ars has Fahm investigate Enan's background and learns that she is a maid working in a mansion for a noble woman named Madam. To further investigate, he goes undercover as a maid named Lynn and learns more about Madam's past. When Enan is forced to do a task by herself, Fahm steps in to help and they begin to bond. That night, Enan sneaks off with Fahm following her, but she mysterious vanishes upon reaching a dead end. Fahm discovers a secret door leading to a hidden room with evidence that hints that she may be planning to poison Ars. Reading her diary, Fahm learns more about Enan's past where she can still talk back when the original Madam was still alive. Fahm also learns that the mansion has thuggish guards. Meanwhile, Madam continues her ploy to eliminate Ars as a flashback reveals that the original Madam was actually poisoned by the new Madam so she can take over her estate and when Enan discovered the scheme, the thugs destroyed her throat and got rid of the evidence. Enan now vows to expose the new Madam's crimes. After the flashback ends, Enan decides to no longer help Madam, who does not take that kindly. Fahm arrives to help and after taking down Madam and her thugs, reveals his true identity and had also recovered the evidence that proves Madam's guilt, with Enan also revealing her own evidence. After Madam and her thugs are arrested, Fahm and Enan report this to Ars, and he lets Enan go free, but she is convinced to stay and work for Ars by Fahm. She is then brought to Shin's workshop where Shin accepts her as his assistant.
34	10	"Two Exceptional Talents"	TBA	TBA	TBA	November 30, 2026
