= I Left My A-Rank Party to Help My Former Students Reach the Dungeon Depths! =

Japanese light novel series and its adaptations

- First light novel volume cover

Aランクパーティを離脱した俺は、元教え子たちと迷宮深部を目指す。 (A-Rank Party o Ridatsu Shita Ore wa, Moto Oshiego-tachi to Meikyū Shinbu o Mezasu)
- Genre: Adventure, fantasy
- Novel series
- Written by: Kōsuke Unagi
- Published by: Shōsetsuka ni Narō
- Original run: October 2, 2020 – February 27, 2025
- Light novel
- Written by: Kōsuke Unagi
- Illustrated by: Super Zombie
- Published by: Kodansha
- Imprint: Kodansha Ranobe Books
- Original run: June 2, 2021 – February 28, 2025
- Volumes: 5
- Manga
- Written by: Kōsuke Unagi
- Illustrated by: Yūri
- Published by: Kodansha
- English publisher: NA: Kodansha USA (digital)
- Imprint: Shōnen Magazine Comics
- Magazine: Magazine Pocket
- Original run: June 25, 2021 – present
- Volumes: 12
- Anime television series
- Directed by: Katsumi Ono
- Written by: Kazuyuki Fudeyasu
- Music by: Go Sakabe
- Studio: BN Pictures
- Licensed by: Crunchyroll (streaming); SEA: Muse Communication
- Original network: NNS (Nippon TV)
- Original run: January 12, 2025 – present
- Episodes: 24
- icon

I Left My A-Rank Party to Help My Former Students Reach the Dungeon Depths! (Note: Japanese: Aランクパーティを離脱した俺は、元教え子たちと迷宮深部を目指す。, Hepburn: A-Rank Party o Ridatsu Shita Ore wa, Moto Oshiego-tachi to Meikyū Shinbu o Mezasu) is a Japanese light novel series written by Kōsuke Unagi and illustrated by Super Zombie. It was serialized online from October 2020 to February 2025 on the user-generated novel publishing website Shōsetsuka ni Narō. It was later acquired by Kodansha, which published five volumes from June 2021 to February 2025 under its Kodansha Ranobe Books imprint. A manga adaptation with art by Yūri has been serialized online via Kodansha's Magazine Pocket website since June 2021 and has been collected in twelve tankōbon volumes. The manga is licensed in North America by Kodansha USA. An anime television series adaptation produced by BN Pictures aired from January to June 2025. A second season has been announced.

== Premise ==
Yuke Feldio, a Red Mage, has left Thunder Pike, his adventurer party of five years; fed up with their stupidity and being ridiculed for his support skills. However, he is almost immediately recruited by a new party consisting of three of his former students: Marina (a Sword Mage), Silk (a Dark Elf Ranger) and Rain (a Priestess/Mage), forming a new party they name Clover.

Despite the low ranks and inexperience of Clover's members, they begin to successfully accomplish increasingly difficult missions, and because parties are encouraged to live stream their missions Clover's continuing successes and undeniable teamwork gains them popularity. Clover becomes even stronger with the addition of a fifth "leaf"—Nene, a cat-girl Scout/Thief, while Thunder Pike begins to discover that without Yuke they are not as strong as they thought and their A Rank status may not be as well-earned as they believed—in fact, their continuing failures put them in danger of serious demotion.

When their attempts to get Yuke to rejoin by tricking him fail to work and create an international incident, Thunder Pike ambushes Clover and blackmails Yuke into taking the blame by threatening the girls' lives. However, Jamie betrays her teammates and saves Clover by sacrificing herself to get them to safety while Thunder Pike falls. Yuke eventually leads a rescue mission to get her, and as the only surviving member of Thunder Pike, Jamie is suspended from adventuring for a year.

Clover is summoned to deal with a newly emerged dungeon and travels to Duna where they find a city that exists inside the dungeon and is suffering from a phantasmagorical effect which distorts people and reality. They learn this dungeon has otherworldly origins and its attempt to escape a world-ending threat brought that threat with it. Amid personal problems within the team which force unusual actions, Yuke becomes closer to each of the girls. When an adventuring group goes insane and threatens domination, Yuke learns of his destiny as the fabled Hero, and manages to end the threat and collapse the dungeon by sacrificing himself. However, he is able to escape and returns to his team.

Following this, Clover is requested to assist in exploring a secret dungeon in a foreign land, which threatens not only to spark civil war within the royal family, but a national tragedy. Personally requested by the King to undertake this important mission, Yuke leads the Clover team on their newest adventure.

== Characters ==
=== Clover ===
Yuke Feldio (ユーク, Yūku)
Voiced by: Hiromu Mineta (Japanese); Drew Breedlove (English)
The protagonist and leader of Clover. He is a support mage who can give his allies multiple boosts at once. He stays well-equipped and studies enemies. He is a very serious person and always looks out for Clover. Investigating the Twilight Threat, Yuke learns his unique abilities identify him as 'The Hero', someone fabled to bring salvation to a world-ending threat. Following this he is granted the nobility status of 'Dungeon Count', the highest rank an adventurer can achieve.
Marina (マリナ) (Yuke's third wife)
Voiced by: Hana Inami (Japanese); Lindsay Seidel (English)
The sword mage of Clover. She was the most recent member before Yuke, so she is a bit clueless about social norms. She has feelings for Yuke. After encountering problems with the male-dominated society of Salmutaria, Marina has the idea of creating a team uniform.
Silk Amberwood (シルク・アンバーウッド, Shiruku Anbāuddo) (Yuke's second wife)
Voiced by: Natsumi Kawaida (Japanese); Marisa Duran (English)
A dark elf ranger with elemental powers. She was the de facto leader of Clover before Yuke was officially designated by her suggestion. Like Marina, she has feelings for him too, and often acts as a mothering-figure to her teammates, often forcing Yuke to relax when he won't take a break.
Rain (レイン, Rein) (Yuke's first wife)
Voiced by: Nene Hieda (Japanese); Bryn Apprill (English)
Priest and mage of Clover. She tends to be shy and is a sleepyhead. Like Marina & Silk, she has feelings for Yuke as well. The team later learn that Rain is believed to be the illegitimate granddaughter of a count, who is forcing her into a political marriage. As a means to protect her, Yuke secretly arranges their marriage on paper, thus making her his wife on paper. As the only girl on Clover officially married to Yuke, Rain establishes herself as having a priority over the others regarding his affections, though nobody on the team besides her and Yuke know they are married.
Nene Shilfindle (ネネ, Nene) (Yuke's fourth wife)
Voiced by: Maria Sashide (Japanese); Kelly Greenshield (English)
A ninja cat girl who was forced to join Clover as a sentence for an as-yet unspecified crime. Recruited temporarily for the Achromatic Darkness mission, Nene proved her value and was asked to officially join. Like all her fellow companions, she has feelings for Yuke but feels rather embarrassed about it. When she doesn't get a chance to hug Yuke goodbye, she instead coerces him into spending a day alone with her for 'Nene Time'.
Jamie Osen (ジェミー, Jemī) (Yuke's fifth wife)
Voiced by: M.A.O (Japanese); Celeste Perez (English)
Ex-Mage of Thunder Pike and the only member who has any morality. After Yuke left, the team began its downward spiral due to challenging dungeons they were woefully under- and ill-prepared for, resulting in them taking out their frustrations on every new member and later on Jamie in Yuke's place. Jamie attempted to nudge the group into rethinking their plans but was ignored by everyone.
Despite Simon, Barry and Camilla being at fault, Jamie was punished in their place as the only survivor of Thunder Pike, but Yuke was able to get her sentence reduced to a temporary suspension from adventuring. She was later pardoned, ending her suspension early, allowing to return to adventuring. Like Marina, Silk and Rain, she has feelings for Yuke, because Jamie is the only member in Thunder Pike who ever treated Yuke equally with kindness and grew close to him; however, due to her needing money to help her sick brother and Simon's dominance, she also (regrettably) turned her back on Yuke, and even though Yuke forgave her, she never really forgave herself. By unanimous decision, she is made an official member of Clover.
Niberune (ニーベルン, Nīberun)
Voiced by: Yuki Tanaka (Japanese); Megan Shipman (English)
A young girl Clover finds in a dungeon in Duna with a mysterious identity. She becomes possessed by a deceased priestess, who brings up dire news that only Clover may be able to prevent.

=== Thunder Pike ===
Simon Berkley (サイモン, Saimon)
Voiced by: Yoshiki Nakajima (Japanese); Stephen E. Moellering (English)
The main antagonist of the first half of the series, the leader of Thunder Pike and Yuke's childhood friend. Simon believes that he is a hero and tactical genius. In reality, he is a jerk who can only rush into a fight, with Yuke constantly having to cover up his mistakes, and who never accepts fallibility due to his ego. He also forgets that his fame comes from live streaming in the dungeons and the support of the king, something that comes back to bite him.
After realizing Thunder Pike couldn't do anything grandiose without Yuke, Simon first tried to lure him back into resuming his former duties with Thunder Pike (which backfires, as guild law states that team leaders cannot be subordinate to one another; resulting in Simon throwing a public tantrum), but when that fails Simon first attempts to steal Clover's hard-won info footage and rewards (a bad move which is caught on camera and broadcast live along with Thunder Pike's xenophobic comments about dark elves), then attempted to force Yuke into leaving Clover. He eventually leads Thunder Pike into a situation that wipes out almost all of his party while he tried to save his own skin by abandoning them. To prevent dying, Simon uses an item to become an immortal undead. In the anime, Yuke transforms Simon into an immobile blob of flesh by using dark magic, and leaving him at the mercy of Shadow Stalkers, forced to spend an eternity in constant agony. In the manga adaptation, Yuke instead manages to undo Simon's immortality, allowing the latter to die.
Barry (バリー, Barī)
Voiced by: Sekai (Japanese); Marcus D. Stimac (English)
The Warrior of Thunder Pike. Dumber than Simon, Barry is just as vile; unable to accept he is a bad guy. He is little more than a thug who thinks newer adventurers are weak. He attempts to help force Yuke sign a contact to enslave him by threatening to sexually violate his friends. However, he is injured in an accident and shortly after torn apart, killed and eaten by Orcs.
Camilla (カミラ, Kamira)
Voiced by: Yoshino Nanjō (Japanese); Taylor Murphy (English)
The Healer Priestess of Thunder Pike. Despite being raised by a church, she lacks compassion and is condescending to those she considers beneath her. Ironically, she stays back and relies on others in combat. She is also religiously intolerant, insulting Silk for her spiritual beliefs. Despite the fact that she knows dark elves were rape victims of orcs, Camilla believes fairy tales that dark elves willingly mate with them.
Her fate is just as cruel and ironic, being taken by Orcs for breeding and (presumably) later killed off-panel.

=== Adventurer's Guild's ===
Benwood (ベンウッド, Benuddo)
Voiced by: Tsuyoshi Koyama (Japanese); Demetrious Murray (English)
The guild master. He is disgusted with Simon for his behavior, and frequently punishes him and the team. Despite this, Benwood is unable to knock any sense into Simon, only managing to register that the king wanted to exile Thunder Pike for nearly causing an international incident.
Mamal (ママル, Mamaru)
Voiced by: Hisako Kanemoto (Japanese); Brianna Roberts (English)
An elf who is the guild's top receptionist; she was a legendary adventurer decades ago. These days, she uses her old combat skills to put rowdy adventurers in their place.
Maniella (マニエラ, Maniera)
Voiced by: Kimiko Saitō (Japanese); Monica Rial (English)
Guildmaster at the Duna Adventurer's Guild.

=== Other characters ===
Saga Feldio (サーガ, Sāga)
Voiced by: Satoshi Hino (Japanese); Ethan Gallardo (English)
Yuke's uncle. He's famous all over the world as the leader of Anubis, an adventurer party that reached the bottom of the Colorless Darkness Dungeon and sealed it.
Camelat-kun (キャメラット君, Kyameratto-kun)
Voiced by: Mayu Tamura (Japanese); Rebecca Chiara Marano (English)
The flying camera artifact Clover uses to live-stream their adventures.
Besio Salas (ベシオ, Beshio)
Voiced by: Kentarou Itou (Japanese); Chris Long (English)
A minor antagonist and a Noble man who was obsessed with Yuke's companions, especially Rain. At first, Besio tried to threaten Yuke to leave Clover so he could join them and have the girls for himself but failed miserably. Then he tried to join forces with Simon to enslave and rape Rain and her fellow companions and subjugate Yuke. Luckily, thanks to Jamie's confession and evidence, Clover was able to thwart Besio's plans and had him arrested by the royal guard.
Mastoma (マストマ, Masutoma)
Voiced by: Shunsuke Takeuchi (Japanese); Anthony Bowling (English)
The second prince of Salmutaria, first introduced as the man whom Rain's grandfather was forcing her to marry for political reasons. After eventually learning that Rain was married to Yuke and, according to his countries societal norms was his property, Mastoma was furious that Count Crowder had deceived him and orders his arrest. He later asks Yuke and Clover for help in conquering a dungeon in his country as part of his plans to become King. He has several wives and, despite his royal title, hates being spoken to formally.
Lady Persephone
Voiced by: Honoka Inoue
She is the Immortal Ruler. To save his friends, Yuke makes a bargain with her, and to commemorate it she places a mark on Yuke which appears on his face.
Loge Vordanian (Loge Vordanian)
Voiced by: Kazuhiko Inoue (Japanese)
Originally encountered by Clover as a mysterious wizened man inside the Glad Shi-im dungeon. Over time it is discovered that he is in fact the son of King Vordan, and older brother to Frya, Niberune's mother. Since becoming trapped inside Glad Shi-im it has been his sole desire to help his niece Nibrune escape the fate shared by all of the city's other inhabitants, but he was prevented from doing so directly. After seeing her gain freedom, Loge fades away.

== Media ==
=== Light novel ===
Written by Kōsuke Unagi, I Left My A-Rank Party to Help My Former Students Reach the Dungeon Depths! was serialized on the user-generated web novel publishing site Shōsetsuka ni Narō from October 2, 2020, to February 27, 2025. It was later acquired by Kodansha who published it as a light novel with illustrations by Super Zombie under their Kodansha Ranobe Books light novel imprint from June 2, 2021, to February 28, 2025.

No.	Release date	ISBN
1	June 2, 2021	978-4-06-523716-8
2	October 1, 2021	978-4-06-524789-1
3	July 1, 2022	978-4-06-527672-3
4	October 2, 2024	978-4-06-536637-0
5	February 28, 2025	978-4-06-538965-2

=== Manga ===
A manga adaptation illustrated by Yūri began serialization on Kodansha's Magazine Pocket website and app on June 25, 2021. The first tankōbon volume was released on October 8, 2021. The manga's chapters have been compiled into thirteen tankōbon volumes as of August 2026.

On January 4, 2024, Kodansha USA announced that they licensed the series for English digital publication.

No.	Original release date	Original ISBN	North American release date	North American ISBN
1	October 8, 2021	978-4-06-525695-4	January 9, 2024	978-1-68-491383-1
2	February 9, 2022	978-4-06-526887-2	February 27, 2024	978-1-68-491437-1
3	July 8, 2022	978-4-06-528176-5	March 12, 2024	979-8-88-933254-1
4	December 9, 2022	978-4-06-529639-4	May 21, 2024	979-8-88-933255-8
5	May 9, 2023	978-4-06-531565-1	July 16, 2024	979-8-88-933455-2
6	October 6, 2023	978-4-06-532886-6	April 28, 2026	979-8-88-933477-4
7	April 9, 2024	978-4-06-535168-0	May 26, 2026	979-8-89-478153-2
8	September 9, 2024	978-4-06-536775-9	June 30, 2026	979-8-89-478580-6
9	January 8, 2025	978-4-06-538050-5	July 28, 2026	979-8-89-478581-3
10	May 9, 2025	978-4-06-539349-9	—	—
11	October 9, 2025	978-4-06-541102-5	—	—
12	March 9, 2026	978-4-06-542968-6	—	—
13	August 7, 2026	978-4-06-544631-7	—	—

=== Anime ===
An anime television series adaptation was announced on September 4, 2024. It is produced by BN Pictures and directed by Katsumi Ono, with series composition and episode scripts by Kazuyuki Fudeyasu, Masakazu Yamazaki designing the characters, and Go Sakabe composing the music. The series aired from January 12 to June 29, 2025, on Nippon TV and its affiliates, and ran for two consecutive cours. (Note: Nippon TV lists the series premiere on January 11, 2025, at 24:55, which is effectively January 12 at 12:55 a.m. JST.) The series' opening theme song is "Enter", performed by L.E.I., while the ending theme songs of "Treasure Chest" (from Episodes 1 to 9), "Mirror" (from Episodes 10 to 17), and "Tapestry" (from Episode 18 to 24) are all performed by Yuki Tanaka. Crunchyroll is streaming the series. Muse Communication licensed the series in Southeast Asia.

A second season was announced following the final episode of the first season.

==== Episodes ====
No.	Title	Directed by (Note: Production staff information is taken from the ending credits of each episode.)	Storyboarded by	Chief animation directed by	Original release date
1	"Clover Is Born"; Transliteration: "Kurōbā Tanjō" (Japanese: クローバー誕生)	Kōsuke Shimotori	Katsumi Ono	Masakazu Yamazaki	January 12, 2025
Yuke Feldio, a Red Mage and Alchemist, is a member of the A-Rank Party Thunder Pike. However, after 5 years, he announces that he's leaving the party. He states that the reason is because the party doesn't treat him equally, despite him providing lots of support. They claim that he doesn't contribute enough, and that him leaving won't affect their party. Simon offers him a chance to change his mind, but he sticks to his decision and leaves. The next day, Yuke looks for new work and runs into Marina, a former student of his, and she invites him to join her D-Rank party. Together with Rain and Silk, the four of them set off to collect magic iron ore from the Paintal Abandoned Mine Dungeon. As they explore, Yuke impresses his team with his Red Mage Skills and Alchemist skills. After defeating a Rock Lizard on the fourth floor, they head to the fifth-floor boss, a Steel Crab. Just before the battle, Yuke decides to record it, and Marina suggests they livestream the fight. She also suggests they form an official party named "Clover", and everyone agrees. Yuke faces the Steel Crab alone and easily defeats it. After storing it in his Magic Bag, they open a chest full of magic iron ore.
2	"The Forest Where a Magic Beast Dwells"; Transliteration: "Majū no Sumu Mori" (Japanese: 魔獣の棲む森)	Ryūta Yamamoto	Katsumi Ono	Yumiko Hara	January 19, 2025
As Clover is heading back to the Guild from completing their quest, the girls praise Yuke for his abilities and guidance. They suggest he becomes their official party leader, though he is reluctant at first. After some encouragement, he accepts the position. Meanwhile, Thunder Pike is struggling to defeat Dile Wolves, and Jamie gets injured, forcing them to retreat. Back at the Guild, Clover celebrates their success while discussing their future plans. Thunder Pike blames their new recruit for failing to provide support and the new recruit quits in a fit of rage. Word gets around the Guild about Yuke's battle with the Steel Crab, drawing everyone's attention. 3 days later, Yuke accepts a C-Rank request to gather stones from a waterfall in Ordan Lakeside Forest for the party. As he's making preparations, he's harassed by a drunk nobleman named Besio Salas who demands that Yuke leave Clover so Besio can join the girls. Yuke trips him with his magic and leaves him unconscious on the streets. When they arrive at the forest, just before they reach the waterfall, they encounter a Magic Beast known as a Zarnag. Yuke orders the girls to flee to safety, but they stay and fight alongside him, buying him time to unleash his powerful move, Prismatic Missile.
3	"Overflow"; Transliteration: "Ōbāfurou" (Japanese: オーバーフロウ)	Ayaka Tsujihashi	Shin'ichi Watanabe	Ippei Ichii	January 26, 2025
Clover is fighting the Magic Beast Zarnag, and Yuke unleashed his move Prismatic Missile. It weakens the beast along with Rain's spell Thunderbolt, and Marina cuts its head off, killing it. The party camps out in the forest, near the waterfall and lake, and Yuke reminisces about his days teaching the girls. Several days later, Guild Master Benwood calls the party to discuss their encounter with the Zarnag and to apologize for putting them in danger. He also promotes the party to C-Rank and Yuke to A-Rank Adventurer. Everyone celebrates at the inn, having earned enough money to buy a base. The girls ask what Yuke wants to accomplish, and he says his goal is to venture to the deepest floor of Achromatic Darkness, like his uncle. As Clover completes more quests, their popularity skyrockets while Thunder Pike is frustrated over their increasing failures, with Jamie isolating herself from the remaining three members as they blame her for their troubles. They then decide to get Yuke back in their party. As Clover returns to the guild at night after a quest, Simon approaches Yuke and tries to persuade him to rejoin, but Yuke rejects his offer. The girls, having eavesdropped on the conversation are worried Yuke may leave, but he assures them that he is not leaving them.
4	"Shadow Stalker"; Transliteration: "Shadō Sutōkā" (Japanese: 影の人(シャドウストーカー))	Kento Nakagomi	Nagisa Miyazaki	Akira Takahashi	February 2, 2025
At the Guild, Yuke tells the girls that Clover has been requested by Earthys, a workshop in Qualto. They were requested to wear new adventurer gear and complete a dungeon for promotion. The party accepts the quests, and head to Qualto where the girls receive new gear. They enter the Aion Ruins Dungeon and make their way to the deepest floor while recording everything. On the second floor, they encounter Orcs. Silk becomes enraged at the sight, due to the history between Orcs and Elves, but Yuke reminds her to remain calm. Yuke and Rain take out two orcs, allowing Marina and Silk to take out the remaining ones. They discover a Memorandum of Revelation scroll and a chest with a Magic Bag inside it. Once they reach the fourth floor, a Shadow Stalker attacks them. The monster overwhelms the party, until Yuke turns the tide with his magic. The girls then work together to finish the monster. Once they reach the door to the Abandoned City dungeon, their quest is complete. The party then decides to spend the next two days exploring Qualto.
5	"Mission"; Transliteration: "Misshon" (Japanese: 国選依頼(ミッション))	Shigeki Awai	Akira Nishimori	Masakazu Yamazaki & Ippei Ichii	February 9, 2025
Thunder Pike is on a quest to combat some Bogles, but the mission ends up a failure. Mamar explains that if they continue to fail, their party will be demoted from A-Rank. As they are discussing what to do, Simon proposes venturing into Achromatic Darkness, in the hopes of roping Yuke back into their party. Meanwhile, Clover is searching for a base and find a suitable 2-story house. When moving in, Yuke is hesitant on living with them, but they reassure him that they trust him. When having dinner together, a broadcast reveals that Achromatic Darkness is open for investigation. Yuke then receives a letter from the Guild saying Thunder Pike wants him to join, but he refuses. This leads to a heated argument between him and Simon in town, as Simon has violated Guild protocol and policy by trying to recruit another active party's member. 2 weeks later, Guild Master Benwood invites Clover to join the investigation, as other parties have backed out for various reasons. Yuke discusses it with his party, and even though he's scared of losing the girls, they all agree to accept. Benwood then introduces them to a new party member, Nene.
6	"Achromatic Darkness"; Transliteration: "Mushoku no Yami" (Japanese: 無色の闇)	Yūdai Ishikawa	Akira Nishimori	Yumiko Hara	February 16, 2025
Nene has joined the party Clover, and they begin their mission. Benwood and Mamar lead the party to the entrance of Achromatic Darkness, which is underneath the Adventurer's Guild. They livestream their exploration as they explore the first floor and encounter a shark-like monster. Yuke and Rain use their magic, while Marina uses a crossbow that Yuke gave her right before the fight, and Silk finishes off the monster. Afterwards, they find a chest in the safe area, rigged with a trap. Nene disables it and it's full of gems, gold, a ring, and a black cube artifact. After exploring the second floor, they discuss their adventure and decide to head back. Before they reach the exit, Thunder Pike suddenly shows and demands they hand over their rewards. Clover refuses, leading to a tense argument, all caught on livestream. 2 days later, Benwood summons Thunder Pike to his office to discuss allegations made against them. Simon tries to defend their actions, leading to Benwood punching him for his insolence. As punishment for their actions, they have to publicly apologize and forfeit their A-Rank status. At night, Simon is alone and blames Yuke for their situation when he is approached by Besio Salas. He offers him a plan to get revenge on Clover and Simon willingly agrees.
7	"The Pale, Immortal Ruler"; Transliteration: "Aojiroki Nō Raifu Kingu" (Japanese: 青白き不死者王(ノーライフキング))	Shigeru Ueda	Moe Katō	Ippei Ichii & Sorato Shimizu	February 23, 2025
At their base, Marina and Yuke examine the black box artifact and it turns into a sword that Marina can use. Later, Clover begins their next expedition into Achromatic Darkness. When they reach the second floor, it turns out to be an open grassy field, with blue skies. Rain uses her magic and spots a house far away. When they approach it, the woman inside invites them in, but Yuke is suspicious of her and rejects her offer. The woman then reveals herself as Persephone, the Pale, Immortal, Ruler. Yuke speaks a phrase that convinces her to spare the party, and before they leave, she leaves a brand on Yuke's face. When they reach the safe zone, they discuss their recent encounter and get some rest. However, Thunder Pike takes them hostage and tries to blackmail Yuke into signing a contract. But before he can sign it, everyone falls into an Orc Pit. Jamie helps free Clover, and they fend off the Orcs while Yuke tries to use a Scroll of Exit. Simon tries everything he can to escape with them, but Jamie stops him, and Clover leaves Thunder Pike behind. As the Orcs start approaching them, Simon injects himself with something before collapsing.
8	"One Who Was Once a Friend"; Transliteration: "Katsute Tomo de Atta Mono" (Japanese: かつて友であったもの)	Ayaka Tsujihashi	Ayaka Tsujihashi	Akira Takahashi	March 2, 2025
Guild Master Benwood visits Clover at their base showing a recording Jamie left behind, revealing proof of Thunder Pike's illegal activities and a distress signal from Jamie. Yuke volunteers to go rescue her, but Benwood is against the idea. After he leaves, Yuke removes the Slave Collar off Rain using the dark magic Persephone gave him. Besio then shows up with two guards, but Clover subdues all three of them. Rain then places the Slave Collar, and Yuke places a curse on him that will kill him if he bothers Rain again. After he's taken away to the royal examiner, Benwood informs Clover that Achromatic Darkness will be sealed, but they go in regardless of the consequences. They manage to find Jamie, but she's badly wounded. Simon appears, revealing that he had used the item from before to become an undead, and tries to kill Yuke out of revenge for leaving him to die. Yuke uses Prismatic Missile infused with dark magic, which ends up turning Simon into a big immobile blob. After healing Jamie's wounds, Shadow Stalkers appear and relentlessly attack Simon, causing him endless pain while Clover leaves the dungeon. A week later, Benwood punishes Clover by forbidding them from party activity for one month, while his own pay is cut for three months for his lack of oversight. Instead of being exiled, Jamie is suspended from being an Adventurer for one year, thanks to the evidence she provided and Yuke vouching for her. She and Yuke reconcile before heading to their respective homes.
9	"A Six-Leaf Clover"; Transliteration: "Mutsuba no Kurōbā" (Japanese: 六つ葉のクローバー)	Hiromasa Irieda	Takayuki Inagaki	Ippei Ichii & Sorato Shimizu	March 9, 2025
A week after Jamie's rescue from Achromatic Darkness, Nene formally becomes a member of Clover. They visit a recovered Jamie, who's now working at the Guild, and deliver a message from Silk requesting Jamie to meet with her. The meeting turns out to be a party for both Nene and Jamie, welcoming them as members of Clover (even though Jamie is still banned from adventuring for a year). Jamie still feels guilty due to her past as a Thunder Pike member, but in the end is persuaded and tearfully accepts. Later, as Yuke walks Jamie home, they reminisce about Thunder Pike's early days; Yuke blames himself for destroying Thunder Pike, but Jamie reassures him that the others had come to take him for granted, so he wasn't to blame. Returning home, Yuke bonds with Rain while washing dishes, then with Silk over a hot drink. To celebrate their suspension being lifted after a month, Clover plans a party (with Jamie and her brother as guests) while accepting a request to explore a new dungeon.
9.5	"Special Party Feature: Clover!"; Transliteration: "Pātī Tokushū! Kurōbā" (Japanese: パーティ特集！クローバー)	Fumitoshi Aigasa	Fumitoshi Aigasa	Akira Takahashi	March 16, 2025
Recap of the first 9 episodes of the series.
10	"Clover's Back in Action!"; Transliteration: "Kurōbā Saishidō!" (Japanese: クローバー再始動！)	Ryūta Yamamoto	Ryūta Yamamoto	Masakazu Yamazaki & Sorato Shimizu	March 23, 2025
Clover is traveling to Duna to explore new dungeons. Upon arriving, the girls are excited by all the different sights, with Yuke explaining about the different peoples. Yuke and Silk go to meet with Adventurer's Guild Master Maniella while Rain, Marina and Nene go out to gather intel. Meeting up with the others at the pub, they find them quarrelling with three adventurers from the neighboring country of Salmutaria (who are speaking their own language, which the girls don't understand); Yuke manages to defuse the situation by managing to speak to them in Salmutarian, telling them (he thinks) that the girls are his family and companions but which actually translates as the four girls are all his wives. They take up residence at The Singing Fawn Inn, which Maniella had arranged for them, and enjoy their very first hot spring experience. The next day, they strategize their approach to the new dungeon and review the other parties they'll be competing against: Fullbound (a B-rank all-male party from Duna) and Misty (a B-rank all-female party from the capital), but Clover will be more involved in gathering information about the dungeon. On the third day, they enter the dungeon, officially making their comeback.
11	"The Capital Distorted by the Twilight"; Transliteration: "Tasogare ni Yugamu Ōto" (Japanese: 黄昏に歪む王都)	Mamoru Enomoto	Moe Katō	Akira Takahashi	March 30, 2025
Clover is exploring the new dungeon located by Lake Ryne near the city of Duna. Everyone is excited for any new discoveries in the dungeon. Nene scouts ahead and reports back about a sentient chain monster. They engage the monster and it's on even footing until Marina destroys it with her Magic Blade technique. After the battle, Yuke collects samples of the chains and a golden ring for the Academy Scholars to analyze. While Nene scouts ahead, everyone discuss their thoughts on the monster, with Marina saying that she sensed that it used to be human. Rain and Silk agree with her thoughts and Nene reports back, having found a staircase that leads upwards and the chain monster's nest. The nest is revealed to be human like, with a bed, desk, books, and scientific equipment. The desk holds a journal with an unknown language, which Yuke asks the scholars through Camerat to decipher. After exploring the nest, the team takes a break at the staircase before continuing. Before they continue onwards, the stairs have a golden glow coming from above, the sight of which causes Yuke's mind to flash back to his fight against Simon in Achromatic Darkness. Feeling unwell from it, Rain covers Yuke with her cloak and has him rest on her lap. When he wakes up, he tells everyone about the emotional trauma from that day, and they all comfort and support him. After having a discussion and a hearty meal, everyone heads up the staircase and discovers a town completely different from Duna. Just when they decide to turn back, a mysterious man named Loge appears out of nowhere. He reveals that the town they're seeing is called Glad Shi-Im, aka the Twilight Capital. Loge then quickly disappears, and a girl appears on the ground unconscious in his place. The next day, Yuke is discussing the mission with Maniella and the Scholars, one topic being that Loge never appeared on the stream. The party Misty had abandoned the mission when several members felt unwell right after entering the dungeon. Maniella asks for Yuke's opinion about the experience, and he believes they stumbled into another world, similar to Achromatic Darkness. A little bit after that discussion, a letter comes to Rain from Count Crowdar, who is her uncle. It says she is to stop being an Adventurer and come home to be wed, which upsets her and frustrates everyone else. However, Marina suggests they ignore the letter since it doesn't officially have Rain's name on it. Everyone agrees with that, and they burn the letter. Yuke asks Nene if she can ask Mamar to look into Rain's lineage and erase it. He also comes up with a secret plan for Rain: for him and Rain to be married, though only on paper. Rain happily agrees to the idea. The next morning, Clover and Fullbound continue their investigation into the dungeon and the Twilight Capital. When Clover reaches the city, they spot some weird creatures that weren't there before.
12	"The Golden Priestess"; Transliteration: "Ōgon no Miko" (Japanese: 黄金の巫女)	Hiroto Katô	Hiroto Katô	Sorato Shimizu	April 6, 2025
Clover is in the dungeon to investigate the Twilight Capital, but right when they arrive a second time, there are chrysalises on the nearby structure. Nene runs ahead to scout, but the chrysalises open their eyes and paralyze her body on sight. It then tries to eat her, but Yuke saves her in time. They battle them by attack from a distance. Marina uses the crossbow, Silk uses fire arrows, and Rain uses ice magic. 3 out of 4 are defeated, and Marina uses her Magic Blade to destroy the last one. The battle leaves Marina rattled, so after collecting more golden rings, they take a quick rest in a nearby building with tea and cookies. Marina explains that she felt like she cut humans again, while Silk and Rain voice their thoughts about the environment. After talking it out, Clover heads to the roof of the building to get a view of the whole city. Then, they head to the castle and meet Loge outside the gate. He introduces them to the Vordan Castle, but when they ask him questions, he speaks in riddles, not giving them a definitive answer. After he leaves, the gate opens, and they look around. They are unable to find a way in, so they head back to discuss the mission with Maniella and the Royal Academy Supervisor, Viscount Bodeman. After the discussion, Nene brings Yuke to the girl they rescued, and he sees that she's floating in the air and glowing a golden light. She speaks to Clover as the Golden Priestess and warns them of a culling, which is the result of her world flowing into theirs. She bids them seek out Loge for answers and stop the culling before the world is swallowed in twilight. She then collapses in Yuke's arms before waking up again. When she wakes up, she introduces herself as Niberune and explains that it was a fragment of someone who resides in her, but they're gone. One week later, Royal Academy Directior Marquis Bedibore visits Duna to speak to Yuke Feldio. The Director shows Yuke an old Mural that the former director was researching, which explains that a culling is when two worlds attempt to overlap, leaving only one remaining. When the Director shows the hero in the mural, he states that Yuke will be the hero who saves the world from the culling, which shocks him.
13	"Biblion, the Book Spirit"; Transliteration: "Hon no Seirei, Biburion" (Japanese: 本の精霊ビブリオン)	Miyu Amano	Nagisa Miyazaki	Sorato Shimizu & Akira Takahashi	April 13, 2025
Yuke gets a pep talk from Rain after the events of the last few days. Two more adventuring parties join Clover to help seal away Glad Shi-im--Scordia and Carmine. Clover forms a plan to infiltrate Vordan Castle with Rune. Successful, Loge shows them the royal archives so they can research the city's history. Glad Shi-im was the royal capital of a country in another world which was overrun by destruction in "Sunset", an event similar to a culling. To escape, King Vordan and all the citizens (who were proficient in magic) concocted a plan to escape certain doom and bring themselves far away from danger. After finding and recruiting Biblion, the book spirit, he helps Yuke decipher notes written in a special textbook on something called "Multi-Destruction Magic Formula", an unprecidented magic power which unstoppably chains multiple spells to get a single result. Yuke determines that the magic that was used to save Glad Shi-im was not transportation magic but a "wish-granting" magic, as the author was searching for a way to overcome the destruction of the world rather than escape it, which was incomplete and used prematurely resulting in an unintended and unhappy salvation. Clover, Carmine, and Scordia call it a day and leave Fullbound inside as they head for the surface.
14	"One Gold"; Transliteration: "Hitotsu no Ōgon" (Japanese: 一つの黄金)	Takahiko Usui	Akira Nishimori	Sorato Shimizu	April 20, 2025
Yuke, Rain, and Moria from Scordia debrief the officials on their findings, including the origins of Glad Shi-im, including that it was going through its own culling period called Sunset which caused Monsters to go berserk under the influence of the Twilight. Attempting to escape King Vordan tried to evacuate the entire city and its population to another dimension by using the 'One Gold': a powerful magic artifact of unknown origin in his possession, which gave him the Gold Rings to give his people, and he used the Wish-Granting magic to transport between dimensions. However due to the Twilights influence and the incomplete spell, the city was transformed into a dungeon inside a new world and the rings mutated the citizens into monsters, destroying their humanity and sealing their memories inside the rings, reforming them into monsters strong enough to survive the trip. Moria explains that the One Gold is the artifact which is generating the Twilight, and is the root cause of all the problems thus must be destroyed because sealing the dungeon won't stop the Twilight from spreading its influence and corrupting this world. Rain's uncle Count Bron Crowder arrives and tries to take her, which fails, but now the other Clover girls are in danger from Duna's Second Prince. Fullbound abducts Rune and takes her into the dungeon, hastening the other parties' resolve so they delve back in. As they mount their charge to the castle, the truth about Rune and Loge's identities are revealed: she is the granddaughter of King Vordan, and Loge is her uncle. Vordan's family was charged with creating the Multi-Destruct magic to save their people, but the magic failed. With the truth taking form, Clover confront Fullbound in the throne room and find the One Gold.
15	"Crossing Time"; Transliteration: "Toki o Koete" (Japanese: 時を超えて)	Kōsuke Shimotori	Takayuki Inagaki	Ippei Ichii & Sorato Shimizu	April 27, 2025
Fullbound kidnapped Rune because offering her to the One Gold was the key to completing the dungeon, and they are using the reanimated corpse of King Vordan to grant their wishes. However, because they are wearing the Gold Rings, the Twilight begins to take hold and transforms them into monsters. Scordia and Carmine arrive to deal with Fullbound whilst Clover gives all their might to defeat King Vordan and rescue Rune. Rain eventually summons a massive fire-based attack which turns Vordan into ash, and Yuke destroys his gold ring before it can reanimate him. Loge appears and reveals that as Vordans son he is now King, but unlike his father wishes to end the twilight curse and end his misery. Knowing the dungeon will collapse and trap whoever remains behind, Yuke tells Clover and the other parties to evacuate from the dungeon, driving the girls to tears but he promises them that he will follow. As Yuke (The Hero), Rune (The Golden Priestess) and Loge (The King) begin the spell to destroy the One Gold, Yuke realizes the One Gold is actually Simon, who eventually transformed into it after being left behind in the Achromatic Darkness and has been travelling through time and multiple dimensions for millennia, looking for someone capable of destroying him so he could be free of his suffering. As the One Gold crumbles, the wish turning Glad Shi-im into a dungeon becomes undone. Loge reveals that his brother (the mage who created the spell) used his wish to ensure his daughter Rune would be able to exist safely in another world, says goodbye to Rune and disappears. The dungeon warps to reveal an immense dark abyss, so Yuke and Rune begin their trek to find the exit. Meanwhile, Rain is approached by her uncle, who offers her information on a device that will enable her to find Yuke if she comes with him, which she accepts.
16	"Return From Twilight, And..."; Transliteration: "Tasogare Kara no Kikan, Soshite..." (Japanese: 黄昏からの帰還、そして...)	Miyu Amano	Moe Katō	-	May 4, 2025
Yuke and Rune, after a brief hike through the abyss, find an exit and emerge in the water of a lake not far from Dune. They return to the inn but discover that due to an unknown time-dilation effect they have been missing for two weeks whereas they last saw the group hours ago. Yuke then learns that Rain had been taken to the Salmutarian Crown Prince's home, looking to use his Seeker's Compass to find Yuke so he goes to get her back, where because of his marriage to her the Prince acknowledges that he cannot have Rain as her husband is alive. Seething that he was tricked by her Uncle who claimed Yuke was dead, the Prince has Bran arrested for tricking him and orders him tortured and imprisoned. The Prince then reveals his true motives for wanting Rain: there is a dungeon in Salmutaria, considered a national secret, and knowledge of its existence is forbidden for outsiders. In order to claim the Royal Throne, the Prince plans to conquer the dungeon and claim it as his achievement. However, due to Salmutaria having no true adventurers, he needed someone from outside the kingdom to do the work for him. Returning to the inn, Yuke is swarmed by people chastising him for worrying them, and the girls are given strict orders to make sure Yuke rests for several days until he is called for debriefing. Marina takes him to the hot spring, where she goads him into offering her anything she wants. After telling him her wish he agrees to it, only to become extremely flustered when Silk, Rain, Nene and Rune join the hot spring and surround him leaving him completely unable to relax.
17	"The Seven-Leaf Clover"; Transliteration: "Nanatsu Ha no Kurōbā" (Japanese: 七つ葉のクローバー)	Hiromasa Irieda	Hiromasa Irieda	Sorato Shimizu	May 11, 2025
Following his full debrief of his time in Glad Shi-im, Yuke learns that in his absence a lot has developed. Prince Mastoma has returned to Salmutaria and diplomatically complained about Crowders deceipt, forcing the king to intervene. Rune is also offered the chance to work with the nobility, but chooses to stay with her friends and joins Clover as its seventh member. Yuke then spends the day with Nene shopping before the team depart and return home. Arriving home to triumphant fanfare, Yuke reports their success to Benwood, who in turn reveals how worried Jamie was about him when he was reported lost, much to her embarrassment. With the base remodelled in their absence to accommodate their increased number, Yuke suggests taking several days break.
18	"King's Order"; Transliteration: "Kingusu Ōdā" (Japanese: 勅命依頼(キングスオーダー))	Ayaka Tsujihashi	Akira Nishimori	Akira Takahashi	May 18, 2025
Yuke is surprised by the arrival of Benwood and a cloaked stranger revealed to be the King Vincent himself undercover. The king explains that Prince Mastoma has formally requested the help of outsiders in dealing with the dungeon in is kingdom, and has opened diplomatic negotiations to bring streaming technology to his country to spurn his citizens to become adventurers in their own right. Accepting the prince's request, the king personally asks for Clover's help, and as a reward for his assistance, and for stopping the culling, Yuke is promoted to Dungeon Count; the highest adventurer rank. Yuke accepts, on the condition that the rest of his party receive matching accessories. In addition, Jamie is granted an official pardon, allowing her to return to adventuring full-time.
19	"The Dungeon Count of Welmelia"; Transliteration: "Uerumeria no Meikyū Haku" (Japanese: ウェルメリアの迷宮伯)	Yudai Ishikawa	Moe Katō	Ippei Ichii	May 25, 2025
20	"The World Turns Inside-Out"; Transliteration: "Uragaeru Sekai" (Japanese: 裏返る世界)	Ryūta Yamamoto	Akira Nishimori	Sorato Shimizu	June 1, 2025
21	"Tenebre"; Transliteration: "Tenebure" (Japanese: 反転迷宮(テネブレ))	Masato Kitagawa	Kunihisa Sugishima	Sorato Shimizu	June 8, 2025
22	"An Unexpected Reunion"; Transliteration: "Omowanu Saikai" (Japanese: 思わぬ再会)	Akihiro Saito	Akihiro Saito	Akira Takahashi	June 15, 2025
23	"The End of the Darkness"; Transliteration: "Yaminohate" (Japanese: 闇の果て)	Mamoru Enomoto	Akira Nishimori	Ippei Ichii	June 22, 2025
24	"Beyond the Dream"; Transliteration: "Yume no, Sono Saki" (Japanese: 夢の、その先)	Kōsuke Shimotori	Katsumi Ono	Masakazu Yamazaki	June 29, 2025
