= As a Reincarnated Aristocrat, I'll Use My Appraisal Skill to Rise in the World =

Japanese light novel series and its adaptation(s)

- First light novel volume cover, featuring (from top to bottom) Ritsu Mouses, Charlotte Wraith, and Ars Louvent

転生貴族、鑑定スキルで成り上がる ～弱小領地を受け継いだので、優秀な人材を増やしていたら、最強領地になってた～ (Tensei Kizoku Kantei Sukiru de Nariagaru: Jakushō Ryōchi o Uketsuidanode, Yūshūna Jinzai o Fuyashite Itara, Saikyō Ryōchi ni Natteta)
- Genre: Isekai
- Novel series
- Written by: Miraijin A
- Published by: Shōsetsuka ni Narō
- Original run: October 31, 2019 – present
- Light novel
- Written by: Miraijin A
- Illustrated by: Jimmy
- Published by: Kodansha
- English publisher: NA: Kodansha USA
- Imprint: Kodansha Ranobe Books
- Original run: July 2, 2020 – present
- Volumes: 9
- Manga
- Written by: Miraijin A
- Illustrated by: Natsumi Inoue
- Published by: Kodansha
- English publisher: NA: Kodansha USA
- Magazine: Magazine Pocket
- Original run: June 26, 2020 – present
- Volumes: 21
- Anime television series
- Directed by: Takao Kato
- Written by: Yasuhiro Nakanishi (S1–S2); Daisuke Ōhigashi (S3)
- Music by: Kujira Yumemi
- Studio: Studio Mother (S1–S2); GeyeG Pictures (S3)
- Licensed by: Crunchyroll (streaming); EA/SEA: Medialink
- Original network: JNN (CBC, TBS), BS NTV, AT-X
- Original run: April 7, 2024 – present
- Episodes: 33
- icon

As a Reincarnated Aristocrat, I'll Use My Appraisal Skill to Rise in the World (Note: Japanese: 転生貴族、鑑定スキルで成り上がる ～弱小領地を受け継いだので、優秀な人材を増やしていたら、最強領地になってた～, Hepburn: Tensei Kizoku Kantei Sukiru de Nariagaru: Jakushō Ryōchi o Uketsuidanode, Yūshūna Jinzai o Fuyashite Itara, Saikyō Ryōchi ni Natteta) is a Japanese light novel series written by Miraijin A. The series originated on the Shōsetsuka ni Narō website, before being acquired and published by Kodansha with illustrations by Jimmy in July 2020. A manga adaptation illustrated by Natsumi Inoue, began serialization on the Magazine Pocket website in June of that same year. An anime television series adaptation produced by Studio Mother aired from April to June 2024. A second season aired from September to December of the same year. A third season produced by GeyeG Pictures premiered in September 2026.

== Plot ==
A Japanese salaryman dies and reincarnates in another world as Ars Louvent, heir of a noble family and discovers that he also possesses the skill to appraise the talents and aptitudes of other people. With his special powers, Ars identifies and convinces powerful individuals who excel in various subjects, from magic and swordsmanship to strategy and diplomacy to become his servants and allies in preparation for an imminent war for the throne's succession. When he demonstrates his prowess, he is promoted to the Lord of Canarre, and soon has to go to war with the neighboring Duchy of Seitz against a wicked lord.

== Characters ==
=== Main ===
Ars Louvent (アルス・ローベント, Arusu Rōbento)
Voiced by: Natsumi Fujiwara (Japanese); Reshel Mae (English)
Heir to the House Louvent who rules the town of Lamberk, Ars is a noble who is the reincarnation of a Japanese salaryman who possesses the ability to appraise other individuals and measure their talents. Making use of his powers, Ars begins drafting notable individuals with remarkable skills as his retainers in order to bolster Lamberk's fighting force.
Ritsu Muses (Note: Some versions translate his name to "Rietz") (リーツ・ミューセス, Rītsu Myūsesu)
Voiced by: Taito Ban (Japanese); Eli Farmer (English)
Originally an orphan from the Marca race who suffers with discrimination from other races in the country, he is recruited by Ars as his first retainer. Despite suffering prejudice at first, Ritsu's loyalty to Ars and outstanding gift for combat and leadership makes him earn the trust from the rest of the Louvent family and he becomes the commander of their army.
Charlotte Wraith (シャーロット・レイス, Shārotto Reisu)
Voiced by: Narumi Kaho (Japanese); Kara Edwards (English)
Another orphan rescued and taken in by Ars after he bought her from a group of slave traders. She excels in magic and becomes the leader of the Louvent family's magician platoon. She sees Ars like a little brother.
Rosell Kischa (ロセル・キーシャ, Roseru Kīsha)
Voiced by: Miho Okasaki (Japanese); Taylor Murphy (English)
A child living in the Louvent family's territory, he is recruited by Ars due to his natural gift as a tactician, eventually becoming his army's strategist.
Lysia Pleid (Note: Some versions translate her name to "Licia Pleide") (リシア・プレイド, Risha Pureido)
Voiced by: Kana Hanazawa (Japanese); Hayden Daviau (English)
Ars' fiancée who excels in politics and diplomacy. Ars becomes wary of her at first due to her high ambition stat, which makes her prone to deceive and betray others, but eventually she truly falls in love with Ars and decides to support him with her skills, becoming his wife and closest confidant.
Raven Louvent (レイヴン・ローベント, Reivun Rōbento)
Voiced by: Hiroki Tōchi (Japanese); John Burgmeier (English)
The head of House Louvent; he is Ars' father who is loved and respected by his family and subjects. He dies of illness when Ars is still a child, making him the new head of the family.
Mireille Grangeon (ミレーユ・グランジオン, Mirēyu Guranjion)
Voiced by: Hitomi Nabatame (Japanese); Katelyn Barr (English)
Former noble that traveled the world drinking and spending her savings. She was discovered by the Shadows and recruited by Ars as a strategist and tactician. She is the older sister of Thomas Grunzeon, adviser of Valmarque, one of the two sons of the Duke of Missian. She gets along well with Charlotte.
Fahm (ファム, Famu)
Voiced by: Haruka Tomatsu (Japanese); Ciarán Strange (English)
The leader of a band of mercenaries called Shadow. Although he looks and sounds like a girl, he is really a guy. While in disguise, he usually poses as a waitress. He uses shadow magic to conceal himself in the darkness where enemies cannot detect or see him, but can still hear him. He later becomes Ars's retainer.

=== Secondary ===
Sofia Louvent (ソフィア・ローベント, Sofia Rōbento)
Voiced by: Ayako Kawasumi (Japanese); Amanda Gael (English)
Ars' mother.
Hammond Pleid (ハマンド・プレイド, Hamando Pureido)
Voiced by: Kōzō Shioya (Japanese); T.J. Anthony (English)
Lysia's father and Ars' father in law.
Kreiz Louvent (クライツ・ローベント, Kuraitsu Rōbento)
Voiced by: Chiharu Hokaze (Japanese); Celeste Perez (English)
Ars' younger brother.
Wren Louvent (レン・ローベント, Ren Rōbento)
Voiced by: Kanon Takao (Japanese); Emi Lo (English)
Ars' younger sister.
Couran Saremakia (クラン・サレマキア, Kuran Saremakia)
Voiced by: Kazuhiko Inoue (Japanese); Ryan Negron (English)
Oldest son of the late Duke of Missian, he wins a war of succession with his brother with help from Ars and his retainers. He is Lenge's father and Vasmarque's brother.
Vasmarque Saremakia (バサマーク・サレマキア, Basamāku Saremakia)
Voiced by: Kenyu Horiuchi (Japanese); Jason Douglas (English)
Couran's brother who challenged him for control over Missian. He is executed after he loses the war against Couran, Ars and their allies. Vasmarque is also Lenge's uncle.
Thomas Grangeon (トーマス・グランジオン, Tōmasu Guranjion)
Voiced by: Yasuhiro Mamiya
Vasmarque's right hand man and Mireille's brother. He possesses immense strength and is convinced by Mireille to join Ars' faction after the war.
Lenge Saremakia (レング・サレマキア, Rengu Saremakia)
Voiced by: Sho Nogami
Son of Couran Saremakia. Despite how overconfident and stuck up he is, he never goes as far as to boss others around or force people to listen to his options; however, he is not fond of using deception.
Chacma Drees (シャクマ・ドリーズ, Shakuma Dorīsu)
Voiced by: Kōji Yusa (Japanese); Abi Kumar (English)
Selena Bandol (セレナ・バンドル, Serena Bandoru)
Voiced by: Yuki Tanaka (Japanese); Abigail Blythe (English)
Daughter of Fraedor Bandol. She is also a mage who wields magic that rivals to that of Charlotte's. Although at first part of Vasmarque's forces, she and her father later deflect to Ars's army due to them not wanting to harm innocent people to ensure their victory.
Ruper Louston (リューパ ・ルーズトン, Ryūpa Rūzuton)
Voiced by: Tomoaki Maeno (Japanese); Aaron Campbell (English)
A lord who was forced to work for Vasmarque for the safety of his kidnapped pregnant wife. After Ars rescues his wife, he allies with Ars in turn.
Clamant Maitrow III (クラマント・メイトロー三世, Kuramanto Meitoro Sansei)
Voiced by: Yuichi Nakamura
The leader of a company that is made out of combat mercenaries. He is on neither side in the war and only helps just to get money. Nevertheless, he helps Ars's army defeat Jean and Dan.
Braham Joe (ブラッハム・ジョー, Burahhamu Jō)
Voiced by: Shūichi Uchida (Japanese); Aaron Dismuke (English)
A warrior who wields an axe that only he can carry and relies more on strength rather than strategy. He was originally part of the enemy forces, but deflected to Ars's side after losing to Ritsu, becoming his apprentice in the process.
Jean Tendry (ジャン・テンドリー, Jan Tendorī)
Voiced by: Yūichirō Umehara (Japanese); Bryson Baugus (English)
The lord of Castle Rolto and one of Vasmarque's allies. He murdered his father so he can become a lord himself. He is defeated by Clamant and he surrenders.
Dan Allest (ダン・アレースト, Dan Arēsuto)
Voiced by: Masashi Yamane
Jean's right-hand man. He is a strong fighter and evenly matched with Ritsu. He is defeated by Ritsu and surrenders.
Zat Brozd
Voiced by: Hinata Tadokoro (Japanese); David Matranga (English)
A warrior who becomes Braham's vice-commander. He at first didn't want to work for Ars because of how young he is, but is forced to reconsider after Braham defeated him.
Musha Trick
Voiced by: Sumire Morohoshi (Japanese); Kayla Temshiv (English)
A mage who serves as Charlotte's assistant. She is timid and insecure.
Shin Seymarrow
An inventor who is known to be accident-prone.
Krantz
A bulter who works for Ars's family.
Grenda Domatheson
The governor of Seitz, who allies with Vasmarque and seeks to capture Ars for his own means.
Borotz
Grenda's right hand man, who is doubtful of Grenda's allegiance to Vasmarque, but still helps him in the war against Ars.
Lantorque Lodder
A general who works for Borotz.
Caesus Lopard
An official of Seitz's army who works with Borotz.
Robert Brandoll
The head of Seitz's army, who is also in allegiance with Borotz.
Kanses Bandol
Vasmarque's knight commander, who he cares deeply for. He is killed following a failed attempt to defeat Couran.
Rikuya Fujimiya (藤宮陸也, Fujimiya Rokuya)
Voiced by: Toshiya Miyata
The next king of Yoh, and Micah and Takao's elder brother. He and his siblings were driven out of their kingdom following an uprising. He carries a sword that honors his legacy following his father's death and refuses to get rid of it. He soon becomes an ally to Ars.
Micah Fujimiya (藤宮ミカ, Fujimiya Mika)
Voiced by: Mariya Ise
Rikuya and Takao's younger sister. She is a skilled strategist. She soon becomes an ally to Ars.
Takao Fujimiya (藤宮タカオ)
Voiced by: Takaki Otomari
Rikuya's younger brother and Micah's older brother. He is a skilled fighter and is powerful enough to match Ritsu's skills. He soon becomes an ally to Ars.
Vigo Buigo
The leader of a group of bandits who formerly work for Seitz. After being defeated in battle by Ars's group, he plots revenge on them. However, he is eventually defeated and arrested.
Georg
A very well known bandit leader who is said to have been killed by Zaht.
Enan Rueges
A young woman who formerly worked as a maid in a mansion owned by Madam. She had a close relationship with the original Madam, and after learned that the original Madam was murdered by the new Madam, her throat was destroyed by the new Madam's thugs, rendering her no longer able to speak and forced her to communicate by writing. After Fahm helps expose the new Madam's crimes, Enan decides to work for Ars as Shin's assistant after some persuasion by Fahm.
Madam
The original Madam was good friends with Enan, but she was murdered by the new Madam, who was cruel towards Enan unlike the original Madam. After Fahm and Enan expose the new Madam's crimes, she and her thugs were arrested.

== Media ==
=== Light novel ===
Written by Miraijin A, As a Reincarnated Aristocrat, I'll Use My Appraisal Skill to Rise in the World began publication on the novel posting website Shōsetsuka ni Narō on October 31, 2019. The series was later acquired and published by Kodansha with illustrations by Jimmy under their Kodansha Ranobe Books imprint on July 2, 2020, with nine volumes released as of June 2026.

In March 2022, Kodansha USA announced that they also licensed the light novel series for English publication.

==== Volumes ====
No.	Original release date	Original ISBN	English release date	English ISBN
1	July 2, 2020	978-4-06-520422-1	January 31, 2023	978-1-64-729194-5
2	January 4, 2021	978-4-06-522062-7	June 27, 2023	978-1-64-729208-9
3	September 2, 2021	978-4-06-524910-9	October 31, 2023	978-1-64-729217-1
4	December 2, 2022	978-4-06-529661-5	February 27, 2024	978-1-64-729312-3
5	July 1, 2023	978-4-06-532067-9	June 25, 2024	978-1-64-729349-9
6	April 2, 2024	978-4-06-535406-3	July 22, 2025	978-1-64-729439-7
7	October 2, 2024	978-4-06-537309-5	November 18, 2025	978-1-64-729497-7
8	February 2, 2026	978-4-06-542126-0	—	—
9	June 2, 2026	978-4-06-543713-1	—	—
10	December 2, 2026	978-4-06-545981-2	—	—

=== Manga ===
A manga adaptation, illustrated by Natsumi Inoue, began serialization in Magazine Pocket on June 26, 2020, with its chapters collected into twenty-one tankōbon volumes as of June 2026.

In November 2021, Kodansha USA announced that they licensed the manga for English publication, with the first volume released in September 2022.

==== Volumes ====
No.	Original release date	Original ISBN	English release date	English ISBN
1	November 9, 2020	978-4-06-521299-8	September 20, 2022	978-1-64-651512-7
2	February 9, 2021	978-4-06-522356-7	November 15, 2022	978-1-64-651513-4
3	May 7, 2021	978-4-06-523160-9	January 17, 2023	978-1-64-651514-1
4	August 6, 2021	978-4-06-524476-0	March 7, 2023	978-1-64-651515-8
5	November 9, 2021	978-4-06-525988-7	May 23, 2023	978-1-64-651647-6
6	February 9, 2022	978-4-06-526906-0	July 25, 2023	978-1-64-651684-1
7	May 9, 2022	978-4-06-527844-4	October 31, 2023	978-1-64-651793-0
8	August 9, 2022	978-4-06-528664-7	November 28, 2023	978-1-64-651832-6
9	November 9, 2022	978-4-06-529715-5	January 30, 2024	978-1-64-651885-2
10	February 9, 2023	978-4-06-528664-7	June 4, 2024	978-1-64-651998-9
11	May 9, 2023	978-4-06-531595-8	July 30, 2024	979-8-88-877025-2
12	August 8, 2023	978-4-06-532595-7	September 24, 2024	979-8-88-877026-9
13	November 9, 2023	978-4-06-533512-3	February 18, 2025	979-8-88-877263-8
14	March 8, 2024	978-4-06-534864-2	April 21, 2026	979-8-88-877443-4
15	June 7, 2024	978-4-06-535799-6	—	—
16	October 8, 2024	978-4-06-537042-1	—	—
17	January 8, 2025	978-4-06-538054-3	—	—
18	May 9, 2025	978-4-06-539048-1	—	—
19	September 9, 2025	978-4-06-541040-0	—	—
20	January 8, 2026	978-4-06-542196-3	—	—
21	June 9, 2026	978-4-06-543619-6	—	—

=== Anime ===
An anime television series adaptation was announced on May 9, 2023. It is produced by Studio Mother and directed by Takao Kato, with scripts written by Yasuhiro Nakanishi, character designs handled by Yūko Yahiro, and music composed by Kujira Yumemi. The series aired from April 7 to June 23, 2024, on the brand new Agaru Anime programming block on all JNN affiliates, including CBC and TBS. The opening theme song is "Blue Days" (ブルーデイズ), performed by True, while the ending theme song is "Finally", performed by Kana Hanazawa. Crunchyroll streamed the series worldwide outside of East Asia. Medialink licensed the series in East (excluding China and Japan) and Southeast Asia for streaming on Ani-One Asia's YouTube channel.

Following the final episode of the first season, a second season was announced, which aired from September 29 to December 22 of the same year, on the same programming block. The opening theme song is "Skillawake" (Note: stylized in all-caps), performed by PassCode, while the ending theme song is "Familiar", performed by Yuki Tanaka.

Following the final episode of the second season, a third season was announced. Produced by GeyeG Pictures, the season premiered on September 27, 2026, on the same programming block. The opening theme song is "Still Water", performed by Rico Sasaki, while the ending theme song is "Hibi o Koete" (日々を越えて), performed by Akuruyo no Hitsuji.

== Reception ==
In the 2021 Next Manga Award, the manga won the U-Next Prize and ranked 18th in the web manga category. By November 2021, the web novel had been viewed more than 30 million times. By September 2024, the series had five million copies in circulation.

Richard Eisenbeis wrote in Anime News Network that the anime's first episodes are "simple and predictable pattern". He noted that the introduction of Lysia "breaks the pattern things get more interesting" adding that Ars' reaction to Lysia's ability makes his weakness clear, thus, adding stakes and drama to the story. He concludes that the anime blends comedy and heartwarming moments, highlighting the hope that one good leader can bring peace and prosperity to a failing empire.

== See also ==
- Sentenced to Be a Hero, a light novel series whose manga adaptation is also illustrated by Natsumi Inoue
