= Yuki Tanaka (voice actress) =

Japanese singer and voice actress

- 田中 有紀
- Born: 26 June 1998 (age 28)
- Occupations: Voice actress; singer
- Years active: 2016–present
- Employer: Asleben
- Notable work: Your Voice: Kimikoe as Kaede Tatsunokuchi; The Idolmaster Shiny Colors as Asahi Serizawa; Trillion Game as Rinrin Takahashi

Yuki Tanaka (田中 有紀, Tanaka Yuki; born 26 June 1998) is a Japanese voice actress and singer from Tokyo, affiliated with Asleben. She has starred as Kaede Tatsunokuchi in Your Voice: Kimikoe, Asahi Serizawa in The Idolmaster Shiny Colors, and Rinrin Takahashi in Trillion Game, and she has been part of the musical groups Now On Air and Kleissis. In October 2024, she made her solo singing debut with her album Crier.

== Biography ==
Yuki Tanaka, a native of Tokyo, was born on 26 June 1998. Interested in singing since her youth, she developed an interest in acting after portraying an elementary school play's lead, as well as in voice acting after becoming interested in anime in junior high school. She was part of a junior high school chorus club and unsuccessfully tried to start a drama club in her high school. She graduated from Human Campus High School's Shinjuku Learning Center.

She auditioned for the Kimikoe Audition for the 2017 film Your Voice: Kimikoe, and made her voice acting debut there as Kaede Tatsunokuchi. She also became part of the group Now On Air due to the audition. She later admitted in an interview that she had only been to this audition because her family did not support her career at the time. In July 2018, she became a founding member of the voice acting unit Kleissis.

She voices Asahi Serizawa, one of the three members of the unit Straylight, in The Idolmaster Shiny Colors, a spinoff of The Idolmaster franchise. As part of the franchise, she has performed in several of Straylight's singles, one of which reached the Top 5 in the Oricon Singles Chart.

In 2024, she starred as Rinrin Takahashi in Trillion Game. She is also voicing Selena Bandol in As a Reincarnated Aristocrat, I'll Use My Appraisal Skill, as well as performing the second season's ending theme "Familiar".

On 2 October 2024, she made her solo singing debut with Lantis, with the album Crier. Her first solo concert "Yuki Tanaka 1st Live: Crier" was held at Hulic Hall Tokyo on 11 January 2025.

Originally affiliated with Office PAC, she transferred to Hirata Office on 1 June 2023. On 1 April 2025, she transferred to Style Cube. On 1 February 2026, she transferred to Asleben.

=== Personal life ===
Her hobbies are karaoke, drawing illustrations, and watching horror movies, and collecting glasses. Her favorite Japanese horror movie is One Missed Call 2. Her special skill is snowboarding.

She is a fan of the manga Inuyasha and, in an interview, compared it to the Bible.

== Filmography ==
=== Television animation ===
Year	Title	Role	Ref.
2017	Garo: Vanishing Line	Monica	
2018	Overlord II	Maid	
2018	Run with the Wind	Schoolgirl	
2019	Blade of the Immortal	Ryo Soma	
2019	Kandagawa Jet Girls	Suzu Ashida	
2019	No Guns Life	Girl	
2020	Woodpecker Detective's Office	Female character	
2021	Kaginado	Audience	
2021	The World Ends with You: The Animation	Mina	
2022	Call of the Night	Schoolgirl	
2022	VazzRock the Animation	Eita (childhood)	
2023	Eternal Boys	Boy, child, fan	
2024	As a Reincarnated Aristocrat, I'll Use My Appraisal Skill	Selena Bandol	
2024	Jellyfish Can't Swim in the Night	Saori	
2024	The Idolmaster Shiny Colors	Asahi Serizawa	
2024	The Strongest Tank's Labyrinth Raids	Saa, Lufea, adventurer, child	
2024	Trillion Game	Rinrin Takahashi	
2025	I Left My A-Rank Party to Help My Former Students Reach the Dungeon Depths!	Niberune	

=== Animated films ===
Year	Title	Role	Ref.
2017	Your Voice: Kimikoe	Kaede Tatsunokuchi	
2022	Drifting Home	Aoi	
2025	100 Meters	Shiina	

=== Stage productions ===
Year	Title	Role	Ref.
2017	Super Manga Taisen Alternative	Reira	

=== Video games ===
Year	Title	Role	Ref.
2019	Arca Last: The World That Ends and the Fruit of the Diva	Kasumi	
2019	Monster Strike	Lucy	
2019	Quiz RPG: The World of Mystic Wiz	Saki	
2019	The Idolmaster Shiny Colors	Asahi Serizawa	
2021	Artery Gear: Fusion	Ginga, Michelle	
2021	Monster Hunter Stories 2: Wings of Ruin	Rider	
2021	Phantasy Star Online 2	Hamanogenshi	
2022	Azur Lane	Lutzow	
2023	Granblue Fantasy	Otherworld Cocoon	
2023	Sega Network Taisen Mahjong MJ	Chanta	
2023	The Idolmaster Shiny Colors: Song for Prism	Asahi Serizawa	

== Discography ==
=== Albums ===
Title	Year	Album details	Peak chart positions		Sales
Title	Year	Album details	JPN	JPN Hot	Sales
Crier	2024	Released: 2 October 2024; Label: Lantis	36	—	—
"—" denotes releases that did not chart or were not released in that region.
