= Alice or Alice =

Japanese manga series

- Cover of Alice or Alice volume 1 by Media Factory

ありすorありす ～シスコン兄さんと双子の妹～ (Arisu or Arisu: Siscon Nii-san to Futago no Imōto)
- Manga
- Written by: Riko Korie
- Published by: Media Factory
- Magazine: Comic Cune
- Original run: September 2013 – present
- Volumes: 4
- Anime television series
- Directed by: Kōsuke Kobayashi
- Written by: Saeka Fujimoto
- Studio: EMT Squared
- Licensed by: NA: Sentai Filmworks
- Original network: Tokyo MX, AT-X, Sun TV
- Original run: April 4, 2018 – June 20, 2018
- Episodes: 12

Alice or Alice (ありすorありす ～シスコン兄さんと双子の妹～, Arisu or Arisu: Siscon Nii-san to Futago no Imōto) is a Japanese four-panel manga series by Riko Korie. It has been serialized since September 2013 in Media Factory's seinen manga magazine Comic Cune, which was originally a magazine supplement in the seinen manga magazine Monthly Comic Alive until August 2015. It has been collected in four tankōbon volumes. An anime television series adaptation by EMT Squared premiered on April 4, 2018.

== Synopsis ==
The story was set in 4-koma format. The story was about twin sisters Airi and Rise living on their older brother-in-law's house. They were always visited by their friends, Maco and her younger sister Coco.

On the way, they found Ruha, and we were introduced to Kisaki, the older brother's childhood friend. A rival maid cafe under Yamirii is the competition of the Kisa Kissa, run by Kisaki and used the four girls as part-time wait staff.

== Characters ==
Rise (りせ)
Voiced by: Ayane Sakura
One of the twins under Big Brother. She was straightforward of the duo. She always wears red coloured clothes.
Airi (あいり)
Voiced by: Rina Hidaka
One of the twins under Big Brother. The tsundere of the duo, and wears blue coloured clothes.
Older brother (兄, Ani)
Voiced by: Yoshitsugu Matsuoka
The unnamed brother-in-law of the twins, who takes care of them.
Maco (マコ, Mako)
Voiced by: Natsumi Takamori
The older sister neighbor and the twins's friend. Despite being good at cooking, she was always at the protagonist's house to eat.
Coco (ココ, Koko)
Voiced by: Ayaka Suwa
The younger sister of Maco. Despite being gentle, she is a terrible cook.
Kisaki (姫咲)
Voiced by: Sora Tokui
Manager of Kisa Kissa, and Big Brother's childhood friend.
Ruha (るは)
Voiced by: Saori Ōnishi
A mysterious woman. Always hungry and spacing out.
Alpaca-san (あるぱかさん, Arupaka-san)
Voiced by: Hiyori Nitta
A Forest Fairy that lives on the twins's house.
Kabi Usagi (カビうさぎ)
Voiced by: Hiyori Nitta
Dust Bunnies were fairies living on Kisaki's cafe, assists her in everything.
Yamirii (ヤミリ一)
Voiced by: Aina Suzuki
Owner of a rival cafe, which focused on witchcraft-themed settings.

== Media ==
=== Manga ===
Alice or Alice is a four-panel manga series by Riko Korie, a Japanese artist who mainly illustrates light novels and visual novels. The series was initially published in Comic Cune as a one-shot in 2013. It began serialization in Comic Cune's November 2013 issue released on September 27, 2013; At first, Comic Cune was a "magazine in magazine" placed in Monthly Comic Alive, later it became independent of Comic Alive and changed to a formal magazine on August 27, 2015. Four tankōbon volumes of the manga were released between January 23, 2015, and July 23, 2019.

=== Anime ===
The 12-episode anime television series adaptation by EMT Squared from April 4 to June 20, 2018. The series is directed by Kōsuke Kobayashi and written by Saeka Fujimoto, with character designs by Naoko Kuwabara. The opening theme titled "A or A!?" is performed by petit milady and the ending theme titled "LONELY ALICE" is performed by Pyxis. Sentai Filmworks has licensed the series and is streaming it on Hidive in North America, Australia, New Zealand, the United Kingdom, South America, Spain and Portugal.

No.	Title (Note: All English titles are taken from Hidive.)	Original release date
1	"A Sister-holic Brother and His Twin Sisters" "Shisukon Nīsan to Futago no Shimai" (Japanese: シスコン兄さんと双子の姉妹)	April 4, 2018
2	"Maco and Coco's Cooking Challenge!" "Mako to Koko ga Ryōri ni Chōsen!" (Japanese: マコとココが料理に挑戦！)	April 11, 2018
3	"Kisaki's Kisa Kissa" "Kisaki no Kisa Kissa ♡" (Japanese: 姫咲のきさきっ茶♡)	April 18, 2018
4	"Ravenous Ruha" "Harapeko no Ruha" (Japanese: ハラペコのるは)	April 25, 2018
5	"Everyone Goes to the Hot Springs!?" "Minna de Onsen Ryokō!?" (Japanese: みんなで温泉旅行！？)	May 2, 2018
6	"Everyone Goes to the Beach!" "Minna de Umi ni Kita yo!" (Japanese: みんなで海に来たよ！)	May 9, 2018
7	"A Rival Appears!? Yamiry has Arrived!" "Raibaru Shutsugen!? Yamirī Tōjō!" (Japanese: ライバル出現!? ヤミリー登場！)	May 16, 2018
8	"Three Dark Christmas Contests!" "Yami no Kurisumasu Sanbon Shōbu!" (Japanese: 闇のクリスマス三本勝負！)	May 23, 2018
9	"A Heart-pounding New Year's?! It's a Sweet Sake Panic!" "Dokidoki oshōgatsu!? Amazake panikku!" (Japanese: ドキドキお正月！？ 甘酒パニック！)	May 30, 2018
10	"A Valentine's Chocolate Showdown!" "Barentain Chokorēto Taiketsu!" (Japanese: バレンタインチョコレート対決！)	June 6, 2018
11	"Rise and Airi's Happy Birthday" "Rise to Airi no Happībāsudei" (Japanese: りせとあいりのハッピーバースデイ)	June 13, 2018
12	"It's Official! We're kisakiss6!" "Kessei kisakisu sikusu" (Japanese: 結成 kisakiss6)	June 20, 2018
