= Riko Korie =

Japanese illustrator and manga artist

- Born: February 2 Tokyo, Japan
- Known for: Visual novels, Light novels
- Notable work: Day when television disappeared Tsuki Tsuki!

Riko Korie (梱枝 りこ, Korie Riko; born February 2 in Tokyo, Japan) is a female Japanese illustrator and manga artist. She was one of the members of Kero Q and Makura.

== List of Works ==
=== Visual novels ===
Under BLUEWATER

- Diagnosis (March 24, 2006)
- Despair Witch (February 11, 2007)
- Diagnosis2 (May 11, 2007)

Under Petit Kero Q

- Day when television disappeared (August 31, 2007)

Under Makura

- Supreme Candy (September 26, 2008)
- Ikinari Anata ni Koishiteiru (July 29, 2011)

Under Lump of Sugar

- Gaku Ou -THE ROYAL SEVEN STARS- (January 27, 2012)
- Magical Charming! (May 31, 2013)

=== Illustrations ===
- The Iceblade Sorcerer Shall Rule the World (Kodansha Ranobe Bunko)
- Lilith ni Omakase! (ASCII Media Works, Dengeki Bunko)
- Tsuki Tsuki! (MF Bunko J)
- Unlimited Fafnir (Kodansha Ranobe Bunko)
- The Hidden Dungeon Only I Can Enter (Mainichi Broadcasting System, Kodansha, Crunchyroll, DMM pictures, DMM Music)

=== Manga ===
- Alice or Alice (Monthly Comic Alive)
- IP Police Tsuduki-chan (Yatate Bunko)

== See also ==
- Dōjinshi
