= Unlimited Fafnir =

Japanese light novel series and its adaptations

- First light novel volume cover

銃皇無尽のファフニール (Jūō Mujin no Fafunīru)
- Genre: Action, fantasy, harem
- Light novel
- Written by: Tsukasa
- Illustrated by: Riko Korie
- Published by: Kodansha
- Imprint: Kodansha Ranobe Bunko
- Original run: July 2013 – November 2017
- Volumes: 15
- Manga
- Written by: Tsukasa
- Illustrated by: Saburouta
- Published by: Kodansha
- Magazine: good! Afternoon
- Original run: March 7, 2014 – December 7, 2015
- Volumes: 4
- Anime television series
- Directed by: Keizō Kusakawa (Note: Credited as Chief Director (総監督, Sō Kantoku).); Jun Takahashi
- Produced by: Jun Takahashi
- Written by: Yuki Enatsu
- Music by: R·O·N
- Studio: Diomedéa
- Original network: TBS, CBC, TUT, Sun TV, BS-TBS
- Original run: January 8, 2015 – March 26, 2015
- Episodes: 12
- icon

Unlimited Fafnir, originally titled Jūō Mujin no Fafnir (Japanese: 銃皇無尽のファフニール, Hepburn: Jūō Mujin no Fafunīru) is a Japanese light novel series written by Tsukasa and illustrated by Riko Korie. Kodansha has published fifteen volumes from July 2013 to November 2017 under their Kodansha Ranobe Bunko imprint. A manga adaptation with art by Saburouta began serialization in Kodansha's seinen manga magazine good! Afternoon from March 2014 to December 2015 and is being published digitally by Crunchyroll in North America. An anime television series adaptation by Diomedéa aired from January 2015 to March 2015.

== Plot ==
The story takes place in a world where supernatural monsters known as "dragons" once existed. 25 years ago, they caused widespread destruction and burnt everything in their path, after which they mysteriously vanished. Soon afterwards, girls born with abilities similar to that of the dragons known as D's came into existence. These D's attend Midgar Academy, an all-girls academy where they can learn to control their powers and use them to battle the dragons.

However, many years later, the secret existence of the only male D in the world, Yuu Mononobe gets thrown into light. Against his wishes, he gets forcibly enrolled into the academy, where he accidentally stumbles upon a girl named Iris Freyja in a state of undress. Embarrassed, she attacks him in self-defense, but the attack ends up getting backfired. Now, Yuu must forge relationships with the other girls in the academy, which includes his adoptive sister, Mitsuki. Together, they must battle against the dragons and uncover the reason behind their sudden disappearance and reappearance.

== Characters ==
=== Class Brynhildr ===
Yū Mononobe (物部 悠, Mononobe Yū)
Voiced by: Yoshitsugu Matsuoka
The protagonist and the only male "D" in the world. He is a 2nd Lieutenant in NIFL and is sent to Midgard on a mission to prevent "D" girls from becoming dragons and so causing widespread destruction. His superior, Loki considers Yū to be the best Fafnir. Upon arriving in Midgard he is reunited with his younger sister, Mitsuki, after a separation of three years. His dark matter fictional weapon is a gun. He receives kisses from Iris on the lips, and Mitsuki, Tear, and Kili on the cheek. Yū has formed a contract with the Dragon Yggdrasil, which allows him to create Anti-Dragon Armaments, capable of killing other Dragons, but at the cost of losing his memories. He is revealed to be a Dragon in Volume 8.
Iris Freyja (イリス・フレイア, Irisu Fureia)
Voiced by: Rina Hidaka
The female protagonist and the oddball of class Brynhildr. Although she has a lot of power, she is inept at using it. She is on the verge of becoming a dragon and feels resigned to her fate until Yū arrives and changes her outlook at life. She also has romantic feelings for Yū, having given him her first kiss as a thank you for everything he has done for her, and is embarrassed when he compliments her on her appearance. Her dark matter fictional weapon is a magic staff called Caduceus.
Mitsuki Mononobe (物部 深月, Mononobe Mitsuki)
Voiced by: Manami Numakura
The student body president of Midgar and Yū's childhood friend who becomes his adoptive younger sister; she likes her 'brother' very much. She was close friends with Haruka's younger sister, Miyako, and during the invasion of the purple Kraken, she was reluctantly forced to kill Miyako, who had become a dragon. Since then, she has been heavily burdened by the responsibility and hasn't gotten along with Lisa because of it. Her dark matter fictional weapon is a bow called Brionac.
Lisa Highwalker (リーザ・ハイウォーカー, Rīza Haiuōkā)
Voiced by: Hisako Kanemoto
One of the main heroines; she is a girl from class Brynhildr who thinks of her classmates as family. She has a strong animosity towards Mitsuki for killing Haruka's younger sister, even though it was the only course of action given the circumstances. She is really close to Tear and is in charge of protecting and taking care of her which brings her and Yuu closer. Her dark matter fictional weapon is a spear called Gungnir.
Firill Crest (フィリル・クレスト, Firiru Kuresuto)
Voiced by: Kana Hanazawa
A girl who is into books. Her dark matter fictional weapon is a grimoire called Necronomicon.
Ariella Lu (アリエラ・ルー, Ariera Rū)
Voiced by: Sora Tokui
A tomboyish girl who is a skilled martial artist. Her dark matter fictional weapon is a shield called Aegis.
Ren Miyazawa (レン・ミヤザワ, Ren Miyazawa)
Voiced by: Fumiko Uchimura
An intelligent girl who is usually seen tinkering on a computer. Her dark matter fictional weapon is a mallet called Mjolnir.
Tear Lightning (ティア・ライトニング, Tia Raitoningu)
Voiced by: Ayane Sakura
A "D" girl who transfers into class Brynhildr. She claims to be Yū's wife and strongly believes herself to be a dragon. She had lived a peaceful life until a dragon cult led by Kili burned her house down and killed her parents. Having been praised by the cult, she took pride in being a dragon, but after meeting Yū she changed her outlook and devoted herself to living as a human. She considers Iris to be her rival for Yū's affections, claiming she won't lose to her.

=== Other characters ===
Kili Surt Muspelheim (キーリ・スルト・ムスペルヘイム, Kiri Suruto Musuperuheimu)
Voiced by: Marina Inoue
The leader of a dragon cult. She holds Tear in high regard and wants her to become a dragon. She disguises herself as Honoka after NIFL took custody of Tear in order to get her back. She became interested in Yū and kissed him after sparing her life.
Honoka Tachikawa (立川 穂乃花, Tachikawa Honoka)
Voiced by: Saori Hayami
A mysterious new student at Midgar Academy. It is later revealed that she is actually Kili.
Haruka Shinomiya (篠宮 遥, Shinomiya Haruka)
Voiced by: Rikako Yamaguchi
The homeroom teacher of class Brynhildr and Colonel in NIFL. Her younger sister Miyako perished during a battle two years ago.
Loki Jotunheim (ロキ・ヨトゥンヘイム, Roki Yotunheimu)
Voiced by: Nobuyuki Hiyama
Yū's superior in NIFL. He ordered Yū to enroll at Midgar to keep a watch on the "D" to keep them from becoming dragons and to kill any "D" who become dragons.
Charlotte B. Lord (シャルロット・B・ロード, Sharurotto B Rōdo)
Voiced by: Risae Matsuda
The headmaster of Midgard Academy and one of the Dragons, 'Gray' Vampire. She has the appearance of a grade school girl.
Mica Stuart (マイカ・スチュアート, Maika Stuart)
Voiced by: Mariko Higashiuchi
Charlotte's attendant.

== Media ==
=== Light novels ===
The first light novel volume was published on July 2, 2013, by Kodansha under their Kodansha Ranobe Bunko imprint. As of November 2017, the series is complete, with fifteen volumes having been published.

| No. | Title | Release date | ISBN |
|---|---|---|---|
| 1 | Dragon's Eden (ドラゴンズ・エデン Doragonzu Eden) | July 2, 2013 | 978-4-04-066432-3 |
| 2 | Scarlet Innocent (スカーレット・イノセント Sukāretto Inosento) | October 2, 2013 | 978-4-06-375326-4 |
| 3 | Crimson Catastrophe (クリムゾン・カタストロフ Kurimuzon Katasutorofu) | December 27, 2013 | 978-4-06-375351-6 |
| 4 | Spirit Howling (スピリット・ハウリング Supiritto Hauringu) | April 2, 2014 | 978-4-06-375363-9 |
| 5 | Midgard's Carnival (ミドガルズ・カーニバル Midogaruzu Kānivaru) | July 2, 2014 | 978-4-06-375379-0 |
| 6 | Emerald Tempest (エメラルド・テンペスト Emerarudo Tenpesuto) | October 2, 2014 | 978-4-06-381406-4 |
| 7 | Black Nemesis (ブラック・ネメシス Burakku Nemeshisu) | December 26, 2014 | 978-4-06-381435-4 |
| 8 | Amethyst Rebirth (アメジスト・リバース Amejisuto Ribāsu) | April 2, 2015 | 978-4-06-381453-8 |
| 9 | Cerulean Engage (セルリアン・エンゲージ Serurian Engēji) | July 2, 2015 | 978-4-06-381472-9 |
| 10 | Invisible Successor (インビジブル・サクセサー Inbijiburu Sakusesā) | October 30, 2015 | 978-4-06-381499-6 |
| 11 | Prismatic Garden (プリズマティック・ガーデン Purizumatikku Gāden) | April 1, 2016 | 978-4-06-381528-3 |
| 12 | Darkness Disaster (ダークネス・ディザスター Dākunesu Dizasutā) | August 2, 2016 | 978-4-06-381550-4 |
| 13 | Stardust Cry (スターダスト・クライ Sutādasuto kurai) | February 2, 2017 | 978-4-06-381582-5 |
| 14 | Rainbow Piece (レインボウ・ピース Reinbou Pīsu) | June 2, 2017 | 978-4-06-381607-5 |
| 15 | Unlimited Shine (アンリミテッド・シャイン Anrimiteddo Shain) | November 2, 2017 | 978-4-06-381624-2 |

=== Manga ===
A manga adaptation, illustrated by Saburouta, was serialized in Kodansha's seinen manga magazine good! Afternoon from March 7, 2014, to December 7, 2015. Kodansha collected its chapters in four tankōbon volumes, released from October 2, 2014, to March 7, 2016.

=== Anime ===
An anime television series adaptation by Diomedéa aired from January 9, 2015 to March 26, 2015. The opening theme is "Flying fafnir", created and performed by trustrick, while the ending theme is "Ray of bullet" by Rina Hidaka and Manami Numakura voice actresses of anime heroines Iris Freyja and Mitsuki Mononobe respectively from episodes 1-12 though episode 12 was sung together with Hisako Kanemoto, Sora Tokui, Fumiko Uchimura and Ayane Sakura who are also voice actresses of Lisa Highwalker, Ariella Lu, Ren Miyazawa, and Tear Lightning respectively.

==== Episode list ====
| No. | Title | Original release date |
|---|---|---|
| 1 | "Dragon Garden Midgard" "Ryūen no Middogaru" (竜園のミッドガル) | January 8, 2015 |
25 years before the start of the series, massive creatures known as Dragons began appearing around the world, causing widespread destruction before vanishing. Shortly afterwards, humans with powers similar to that of Dragons were born and came to be known as D. At present day, the world's only male D, Yuu Mononobe, is transferred to Midgard and encounters a naked girl, Iris Freyja, at the beach. Iris mistakes him for an intruder and unsuccessfully tries to attack him, but then loses consciousness due to her attack backfiring and is saved by him. While the two talk, Yuu is approached by his sister, Mitsuki Mononobe, who announces to him that he will be a Midgard student henceforth. The next day, Yuu is placed in Brynhildr Class, where he faces opposition from the girls and is forced to perform dark matter transmutation to prove his status as a D. While watching a practice drill alongside Haruka Shinomiya, the teacher of Brynhildr Class, Yuu is informed that Dragons seek Ds as their mates and that a D's dragon mark changes color when she is targeted by a Dragon, transforming into the same kind of Dragon upon contact. Following Iris' failure at transmutation, Yuu has a chat with her, where she explains to him her reason for fighting against Dragons. However, their discussion is interrupted when an emergency alert sounds, announcing 'White' Leviathan's approach, while at the same time, Iris' dragon mark starts changing color.
| 2 | "White Leviathan" "Shiro no Rivuaiasan" (白のリヴァイアサン) | January 15, 2015 |
Yuu is contacted by his former superior in NIFL, Major Loki Jotunheim, who asks Yuu to kill the D targeted by Leviathan to prevent an increase in Dragons. Iris is afraid of turning into a Dragon and hurting everyone, but Yuu reassures her that he will kill her himself if it comes down to it. The rest of girls prepare for combat as Leviathan approaches the island.
| 3 | "Howling Fafnir" "Hōkō no Fafunīru" (咆哮のファフニール) | January 22, 2015 |
While the girls are fighting Leviathan, NIFL soldiers attack Iris in order to kill her before she turns into a Dragon. Yuu protects Iris by defeating the soldiers and has her use her newfound power of explosion to bypass Leviathan's repulsive field and attack it directly, which however is not enough to defeat it. At that moment, Yuu makes another deal with Yggdrasil, sacrificing a part of his memories to download blueprints for a new weapon, the Babel cannon. Borrowing dark matter from Iris, Yuu forms the weapon and uses it to destroy Leviathan with the aid of the rest of the girls. Following the conclusion of the battle, Yuu is called to the beach by Iris, who kisses him as a sign of her gratitude for everything he had done for her.
| 4 | "Tear the Dragon Girl" "Ryūto no Tia" (竜人のティア) | January 29, 2015 |
A young D, Tear Lightning, enrolls at Midgard and claims that Yuu is her husband as he was the person who saved her life from a criminal group. However, Tear's behaviour and firm belief that she's a Dragon make things difficult. Eventually, Yuu convinces her to open up to her classmates and she starts becoming more social. However, when Lisa attempts to teach Tear how to form a Fictional Armament, Tear's deeply-rooted belief that she is a Dragon causes her to encase herself in a giant dragon-shaped Fictional Armament, which goes berserk and starts rampaging.
| 5 | "Blazing Muspelheim" "Kaen no Musuperuheimu" (禍焔のムスペルへイム) | February 5, 2015 |
Tear's dragon-shaped Fictional Armament fully materializes and goes berserk. Lisa succeeds in destroying the dragon, bringing Tear back to normal, although Tear faints from exhaustion. After taking Tear to the infirmary, Yuu has a friendly conversation with Honoka and is contacted afterwards by Major Loki. Loki warns Yuu that dragon cultists are expected to mount an operation to retrieve Tear, and that their leader, Kili Surtr Muspelheim, is expected to take action as well. When Tear regains consciousness, Yuu takes her to the beach and explains what happened during practice. After Yuu requests for Tear to think of herself as a human from now on, Tear lashes out, but eventually breaks down crying upon remembering what happened to her parents. Yuu then takes Tear to apologize to the rest of the class, with Iris proposing that they should hang out at the beach the next day. Brynhildr Class is also joined by Charlotte and Mica during their beach outing. However, at the same night, Hekatonkheir suddenly appears out of nowhere and attacks Midgard.
| 6 | "Red-Winged Tiamat" "Kōyoku no Tiamato" (紅翼のティアマト) | February 12, 2015 |
Following Hekatonkheir's sudden appearance, Midgard enters a state of maximum alert. Mitsuki co-ordinates the members of the Counter-Dragon Squad in assuming positions and leaves Tear in Lisa's care. However, the two of them are attacked by Kili Surtr Muspelheim, who intends to retrieve Tear amidst the chaos. Although Lisa tries to fight her off, Kili proves to be too powerful, forcing Lisa to run away with Tear. Kili catches up to them, knocking out Lisa and capturing Tear. Yuu, however, succeeds in intercepting Kili. Although he is at first outmatched by her, Yuu turns the tables by generating a repulsive field similar to 'White' Leviathan's one in order to push Kili away. However, before the two can resume their fight, Hekatonkheir starts moving and smashes the principal's office.
| 7 | "Scarlet Innocent" "Sukāretto· inosento" (スカーレット・イノセント) | February 19, 2015 |
After Hekatonkheir becomes active, Kili retreats from the battlefield. Before she leaves, Yuu questions her about what type of being she is. Kili requests for him to decide what she is, before disappearing. Although Yuu attempts to take Tear to safety, she insists on fighting alongside the others, something which Mitsuki allows. The Counter-Dragon Squad attempts to push Hekatonkheir into the water, but their attempts are unsuccessful, as is Tear's attack with her dragon wings. At that moment, 'Green' Yggdrasil contacts Yuu and grants him access to 'White' Leviathan's Authority, antigravity, in order to levitate Hekatonkheir. This allows the Counter-Dragon Squad to push Hekatonkheir into the sea, enabling Yuu to destroy the Dragon by constructing an Anti-Dragon Armament with Tear's dark matter. In the aftermath of the attack, Charlotte, Mica and Haruka are revealed to be OK, and Lisa wakes up in the infirmary. Later on, Tear declares her intention to marry Yuu and kisses him on the cheek as a sign of their engagement, sparking an argument between her and Iris, which is broken up by Mitsuki. That night, during a discussion with Mitsuki about their past, Yuu is shocked to discover that he has lost more memories than he believed. When Mitsuki states that she'll keep fighting the Dragons to atone for her sins, Yuu declares that he'll do everything he can to end her fight and won't give up on her happiness.
| 8 | "Basilisk Attacks" "Shinkō no bajirisuku" (侵攻のバジリスク) | February 26, 2015 |
After news of 'Red' Basilisk's imminent approach reach Midgard, Brynhildr Class and Honoka are dispatched to lure it into a deserted island and destroy it. En route to the island, Yuu and Ariella witness a confrontation between Lisa and Mitsuki over the matter of Miyako Shinomiya's death. Later on that day, Yuu is visited by Firill, who explains to him that Lisa doesn't actually hate Mitsuki at all. At night, Yuu requests for Mitsuki to tell him what happened two years ago. Mitsuki consents, narrating how she met Miyako, the details of the battle against 'Purple' Kraken and Miyako's death at her hands. After hearing the whole story, Yuu requests for Mitsuki to ask Lisa to forgive her, which she eventually agrees to. The next day, Lisa confronts Yuu for meddling in this affair and states that she will think of a very difficult condition for Mitsuki to earn her forgiveness.
| 9 | "Front Line in Distant Waters" "Zekkai no furonto rain" (絶海のフロントライン) | March 5, 2015 |
At NIFL, Major Loki meets up with Major General Dylan, and the two inspect the anti-Basilisk weapon, Mistilteinn, which they are confident will destroy the Dragon. Meanwhile, the Counter-Dragon Squad finally arrives at the volcanic island that will become the sight of their battle against Basilisk. Upon disembarking, Firill gives Yuu a one-day ticket for the exclusive use of the island's hot springs as a means of thanking him for his help regarding the matter between Lisa and Mitsuki. Yuu visits the hot springs the same night, but is shocked when the rest of the girls also come in, forcing him to hide. Firill discovers him and explains that she wished to further reward him by allowing him to see the naked bodies of girls. Yuu is almost discovered, but is saved by a timely emergency call. Mitsuki then informs everyone that NIFL's operation against Basilisk will begin tomorrow. The next morning, everyone gathers together at the briefing room, where Major General Dylan explains Basilisk's ability and NIFL's plan against to destroy it by dropping a mithril-coated bomb, Mistilteinn, on it. The plan is put into action the same night and, initially, Basilisk seems incapable of destroying the bomb with its Catastrophe. However, Basilisk proceeds to fire an even stronger version of Catastrophe from a third eye hidden in its back, evaporating Mistilteinn. At the same time, Tear's dragon mark heats up, causing her to collapse in pain.
| 10 | "Red Catastrophe" "Akairo no katasutorofu" (赤色のカタストロフ) | March 12, 2015 |
Following the failure of NIFL's operation against 'Red' Basilisk, Tear collapses in pain and is sent to the infirmary. After that development, the Counter-Dragon Squad starts planning its own operation against the Dragon, intending to attack it by using the volcanic island and the horizon line as cover. While practicing his anti-gravity abilities that he gained from 'White' Leviathan, Yuu comes across Iris, who is also training. Although he tries to clarify their relationship, Iris asks him to wait until the battle against Basilisk is concluded in order to focus their efforts on protecting Tear. Some time after, the Counter-Dragon Squad takes position behind the island's volcano and prepares to attack Basilisk. However, just as they launch their attacks, Basilisk intercepts them, having somehow foreseen their actions, with the enhanced Catastrophe.
| 11 | "Mistilteinn Falls" "Ten-tsui No misutorutein" (天墜のミストルテイン) | March 19, 2015 |
The Counter-Dragon Squad barely evades Basilisk's enhanced Catastrophe thanks to Honoka's quick actions and Yuu's antigravity, and is subsequently forced to retreat. After studying the combat data of the operations against Basilisk, Yuu comes up with a plan to defeat the Dragon and asks for Major Loki's assistance in order to secure Mistilteinn. Although curious, Loki agrees to help out. When the Counter-Dragon Squad assembles, Yuu explains his plan, which involves using dark matter conversion in order to generate enough mithril to enable Mistilteinn to withstand the enhanced Catastrophe for its five-second duration. Although everyone is enthusiastic about the new plan, Honoka confronts Yuu privately, stating that she believes Basilisk can see into the future. Before she can elaborate, Yuu is dragged away by Iris in order to help resolve a fight between Lisa and Mitsuki, caused by the fact that Mitsuki wishes to descend along with Mistilteinn in order to control its trajectory. When everyone else also volunteers, Lisa announces that she has thought of what she wants Mitsuki to do in order to make amends for Miyako's death. She demands that Mitsuki include everyone in the operation and think up of a plan that will enable everyone to return alive. After conversing with Mitsuki, Yuu goes to the infirmary, only to discover that someone has taken Tear. He soon finds out that Honoka is the one responsible, who proceeds to reveal that her true identity is Kili Surtr Muspelheim.
| 12 | "Unlimited Fafnir" "Anrimiteddo· fafunīru" (アンリミテッド・ファフニール) | March 26, 2015 |
Yuu fights against Kili in order to rescue Tear. Although he is at first outmatched, he manages to turn the tables and almost kills Kili. However, he decides to spare her, stating that he thinks of her as a human, not a Dragon. Surprised by this, Kili decides to retreat after asking Yuu to show her that he is a greater man than Basilisk and kisses him on the cheek. The next day, the Counter-Dragon Squad begins its operation against Basilisk after being briefed by Mitsuki. Although Mistilteinn is destroyed, the Counter-Dragon Squad succeeds in destroying Basilisk with consecutive attacks. Following the Dragon's demise, Lisa forgives Mitsuki as she promised. In the aftermath of the operation, Brynhildr Class returns to Midgard. While discussing with Mitsuki, Yuu realizes that he has forgotten that Mitsuki is not his sister by blood after she declares that she won't give up on him. Later on, Yuu meets with Iris in the beach and reveals to her the deal he made with 'Green' Yggdrasil and his memory loss. In response, Iris promises that she will always stay with Yuu and that she will remember all of his memories for him.

== Reception ==
The anime series' first episode garnered negative reviews from Anime News Network's staff during the Winter 2015 season previews. Nick Creamer criticized the rampant use of comedy gags and fantasy-harem clichés throughout the runtime and the artwork feeling lifeless and off-model, but was entertained by the unintentional humor from the show's magical terminology. Rebecca Silverman felt the premise and ideas throughout had potential but were hampered by unlikable characters and poor execution in its pacing and animation, concluding that: "If those can be resolved, it may well turn out better than it appears. As a first episode, however, it is less than impressive." Theron Martin put the show's debut alongside Absolute Duo's in the run for "blandest start to the new season," criticizing the uninspired setup of its dragons, overlong character introductions and an inconsistent color palette.
