= Didn't I Say to Make My Abilities Average in the Next Life?! =

Japanese light novel series

- The cover of the first light novel featuring the character Adele von Ascham

私、能力は平均値でって言ったよね! (Watashi, Nouryoku wa Heikinchi de tte Itta yo ne!)
- Genre: Comedy, fantasy, isekai
- Novel series
- Written by: FUNA
- Published by: Shōsetsuka ni Narō
- Original run: January 14, 2016 – present
- Light novel
- Written by: FUNA
- Illustrated by: Itsuki Akata
- Published by: Earth Star Entertainment (1–13); Square Enix (14–)
- English publisher: NA: Seven Seas Entertainment
- Imprint: Earth Star Novel (1–13); SQEX Novel (14–)
- Original run: May 14, 2016 – present
- Volumes: 21
- Manga
- Illustrated by: Neko Mint
- Published by: Earth Star Entertainment
- English publisher: NA: Seven Seas Entertainment
- Magazine: Comic Earth Star
- Original run: August 5, 2016 – present
- Volumes: 4
- Manga

Didn't I Say to Make My Abilities Average in the Next Life?! Everyday Misadventures!
- Illustrated by: Yuuki Moritaka
- Published by: Earth Star Entertainment
- English publisher: NA: Seven Seas Entertainment
- Magazine: Comic Earth Star
- Original run: July 11, 2019 – present
- Volumes: 4
- Anime television series
- Directed by: Masahiko Ohta
- Written by: Takashi Aoshima
- Music by: Yasuhiro Misawa
- Studio: Project No.9
- Licensed by: NA: Crunchyroll
- Original network: AT-X, Tokyo MX, BS11, TVA, ABC
- Original run: October 7, 2019 – December 23, 2019
- Episodes: 12
- Manga
- Illustrated by: iimAn
- Published by: Square Enix
- Magazine: Gangan Online
- Original run: December 1, 2021 – present
- Volumes: 4
- icon

Didn't I Say to Make My Abilities Average in the Next Life?! (Japanese: 私、能力は平均値でって言ったよね!, Hepburn: Watashi, Nōryoku wa Heikinchi de tte Itta yo ne!) is a Japanese light novel series written by FUNA and illustrated by Itsuki Akata. A manga adaptation by Neko Mint began serialization in 2016. Both the light novel and manga have been licensed in North America by Seven Seas Entertainment. An anime television series adaptation by Project No.9 aired from October 7 to December 23, 2019.

== Plot ==
Misato Kurihara, a genius girl who couldn't make any friends due to her exceptional abilities, is killed after being run over while protecting a young girl. Offered the chance to be reborn into a fantasy world, Misato asks that she simply be reincarnated with average abilities. After she regains her memory of her old life, she discovers that "average" in this new world takes into account the power of the absolute strongest and the absolute weakest magical creatures, resulting in her physical and magical abilities being 6,800 times stronger than that of a typical human. The magic used in this world is effected by nanomachines created by a more advanced civilization; the project was eventually abandoned, however, and the world's civilization has regressed and since stagnated as a result.

Reborn as the noble Adele von Ascham, her life takes a sharp turn at the age of eight, when her mother and her grandfather are assassinated by her conniving father, who then marries his mistress and then begins favoring his other daughter. By the age of ten, Adele is sent off to the prestigious Eckland Academy, where she makes the first friends in her two lives. However, when she uses her tremendous magical abilities to save a boy from being beaten by the royal princess' escort and passes herself off as the mortal vessel of a god, the resulting attention towards her person forces her to flee to another kingdom. Attending Hunter's Prep School and forming a team with her classmates Mavis, Reina, and Pauline, Adele tries her best to live her life as normally as possible, which does not prove to be an easy feat.

== Characters ==
=== The Crimson Vow ===
A group of talented female hunters. Despite their young age, they are actually skilled fighters, even though others would think otherwise. Mile is the party's strongest member. Because of how strong their friendship is, they see each other as family, notably as sisters.

Adele von Ascham (アデル・フォン・アスカム, Aderu fon Asukamu) / Mile (マイル, Mairu)
Voiced by: Hikaru Koide (CM), Azumi Waki (anime) (Japanese); Sarah Anne Williams (English)
The central character, Adele is a twelve-year-old girl with long silver hair. She was originally an intelligent Japanese high school girl named Misato Kurihara (栗原 海里, Kurihara Misato), who was unable to make friends due to the expectations placed upon her. After losing her life while saving an elementary school girl from an oncoming truck, she was offered the chance to be reincarnated into a fantasy world, asking only that she would be given "average" abilities so she can live a normal life. After regaining her memories at the age of ten, Adele discovered that her "averaged" abilities actually bestow her with excessive physical strength and powerful magic. After failing to hide her abilities at Eckland Academy, she left her home country and took on the alias of "Mile" to attend Hunter's Prep School, where she forms a party named The Crimson Vow (赤き誓い, Akaki Chikai). She loves books, anime, manga, and video games, the knowledge of which she uses in her new life in very interesting ways, including training her friends to make them more formidable. She is insecure about her flat chest, which provokes her anger when someone points it out.
Adele's cover name is derived from the term "nautical mile" in Japanese, which has the same kanji as her Japanese first name.
Reina (レーナ, Rēna)
Voiced by: Yuki Nakashima (CM), Sora Tokui (anime) (Japanese); Colleen O'Shaughnessey (English)
Also known as Crimson Reina, she is a mage specializing in fire magic. She was born to a traveling merchant, and became a Hunter at an early age, giving her the most practical knowledge and experience amongst the Crimson Vow party members. She has a signature fire spell called Crimson Hellfire, and has a particular hatred for bandits after both her father and a Hunter group who had taken her in were killed by such brigands. Despite being fifteen years old at the start of the series, she is assumed to be a similar age to Mile, the youngest member of their group, due to her petite height and appearance, which is a source of annoyance for her.
Mavis von Austien (メーヴィス・フォン・オースティン, Mēvisu fon Ōsutin)
Voiced by: Fumiko Uchimura (anime) (Japanese); Claire Corlett (English)
The official leader of the Crimson Vow (although it is always Reina that does the actual "leading"), Mavis is a 17-year-old swordswoman of noble birth. She is tall and has an androgynous appearance, making her popular with other girls, and is a softie for sappy and sad stories, especially the backstories behind each of her friends. After running away from home in the hopes of becoming a knight, due to her father not approving of her decision, she met the other members of the Crimson Vow at the Hunters' Prep School and helped to form the party. When her father later tries to force her back into the role of a demure noble's daughter, Mavis and Mile manage to change the Count's mind (though not his worry) by defeating him and his eldest son in single combat, proving their ability to take care of themselves.
Pauline (ポーリン, Pōrin)
Voiced by: Masumi Tazawa (anime) (Japanese); Veronica Taylor (English)
A 14-year-old mage specializing in healing and water magic, she is the daughter of a merchant and the resident bookkeeper of the Crimson Vow. She usually is shy and mild-mannered, but when her friends and loved ones are concerned, she can manifest a very vicious edge. Pauline became a hunter to avenge her father, who was killed by thieves employed by the president of the Beckett merchant company, who absorbed her family's shop into his enterprise and forced Pauline's mother into becoming his lover. However, with the help of her friends, Pauline succeeds in exposing the villainy of the Beckett president and his benefactor, Viscount Borderman.

=== The Wonder Trio ===
A trio of girls led by Marcela, who are capable of using magic in a very skilled way. They used to be friends with Adele, but after she moved away, it is unknown if they still maintain their friendship with her.

Marcela (マルセラ, Marusera)
Voiced by: Maki Kawase (anime)
The third daughter of a baron and a friend of Adele's. At first highly jealous of the attention Adele received for her abilities and popularity, she and her friends softened up on her after learning of her tragic family past and sincere personality. Adele eventually trains them in using their magic more effectively, causing the Eckland Academy principal to nickname the three of them (among other titulations) The Wonder Trio.
Monika (モニカ, Monika)
Voiced by: Kiyono Yasuno (anime)
The daughter of a merchant and a friend of Adele's.
Aureana (オリアーナ, Oriāna)
Voiced by: Hisako Tōjō (anime) (Japanese); Tara Sands (English)
A commoner attending Eckland Academy on scholarship and a friend of Adele's.

=== Kingdom of Tils ===
This is where the Crimson Vow reside, using Lenny's inn as their base. Mile moved here to avoid unwanted attention from her previous hometown.

Lenny (レニー, Renī)
Voiced by: Hiyori Kono (anime) (Japanese); Cristina Vee (English)
The daughter of a family managing the inn where Mile and later the whole of Crimson Vow take up residence. Despite her tender age, she is a very shrewd businessperson and thus the one person effectively running the establishment. She is good friends with Crimson Vow.
Booneclift (ブーンクリフト, Būnkurifuto)
Voiced by: Hiroshi Naka (old) and Haruna Momono (young)
A mage who became obsessed with studying and taming wyverns. After he received Lobreath from a demon, he grew to love the wyvern as a friend, but chose to remain ignorant to the damage a hungry wyvern could cause to a fiefdom's economy.
Clairia
An elven mage and scholar specializing in archaeology. She was part of an expedition which got captured by a group of beastmen working for a trio of dragons who secretly conducted an excavation project on human lands. After being freed by Crimson Vow, she has become interested in Mile because of the latter's absurdly high power levels.

=== Kingdom of Brandel ===
This is where Mile previously lived, but after drawing attention from the king, she had to flee to evade the unnecessary attention.

Morena (モレナ, Morena)
Voiced by: Sayumi Watabe
The third child of the king of Brandel. A direct participant in the incident which forced Adele to reveal her powers in public, she becomes - with some encouragement by her father, who is seeking the supposed "goddess'" favor - interested in Adele after learning of her familial circumstances.
The von Ascham Family
Voiced by: Arisa Hirose (Prissy)
As described above, Adele's father had married into the von Ascham family and then orchestrated the assassination of his wife, Viscountess von Ascham, and her father, the former family patriarch, to claim their family's wealth and prestige. After shunning his daughter, Adele, to a boarding school, he intended to raise his daughter by his mistress, Prissy, as his only heir. However, when the avatar incident prompts the king to invite Adele to the royal palace, Adele instead deflects the invitation towards Prissy before fleeing the kingdom to escape the unwanted publicity. As a result of this, and the testimony of the late Viscountess' personal friends, the treacherous Viscount and his new family are found out and imprisoned.

=== Others ===
The Creator (創造主, Sōzōnushi)
A young man who Misato met after her death, who claims to have a role similar to "God". As thanks to Misato for saving a girl he had chosen to be mankind's future savior, he grants her a reincarnation into a fantasy world with average abilities, as requested. However, since he measured the term "average" using the new world's most powerful creature - an ancient dragon - as a template, Misato's reincarnation has been granted powers far beyond what she actually wanted.
Nano (ナノ, Nano)
Voiced by: Wataru Hatano (anime) (Japanese); Steve Staley (English)
A mysterious creature that only communicates with Adele. It watches over the nanomachines that make up people's magic in the other world. In the manga, it appears as a tiny, sphere-bodied robot, while in the anime, it looks like a young cat. Nano's character is a personification of the nanomachines featured in the novel series, where their manifestations are far more impersonal.
Keiko Kurihara (栗原 経緯子, Kurihara Keiko)
Voiced by: Saima Takano
Misato's younger sister. Although she loves her family, she is not a hardcore otaku like the rest of them.
Arledy
A villainous woman who has a great obsession for young girls.
Anne
The granddaughter of an elderly merchant.
Viscount Borderman
An ally of the Beckett president.
Lobreath
A wyvern who is a close friend to Booneclift.
Count Austien
Mavis's father, who is somewhat protective of his daughter and did not like the idea of her becoming a knight, but Crimson Vow is able to convince him to respect Mavis's wishes.

== Media ==
=== Web novel ===
FUNA began serializing the story as a web novel on the user-generated novel publishing website Shōsetsuka ni Narō on January 14, 2016. As of June 17, 2025, 701 chapters of the web novel have been published.

=== Light novels ===
The series was acquired for print publication by Earth Star Entertainment, who published the first light novel, with illustrations by Itsuki Akata, in May 2016 under their Earth Star Novel imprint. On November 8, 2020, Square Enix announced that they acquired the series and would release it under their newly created SQEX Novel imprint from the fourteenth volume on January 7, 2021.

Seven Seas Entertainment announced on September 11, 2017, that they had licensed the series.

Additionally, a spin-off light novel titled "Lily's Miracle" was written by Kousuke Akai and released on December 14, 2019 (English: November 9, 2021, ISBN 978-1-64827-335-3).

No.	Original release date	Original ISBN	English release date	English ISBN
1	May 14, 2016	978-4-8030-0922-4	June 12, 2018	978-1-62692-869-5
2	August 15, 2016	978-4-8030-0949-1	August 7, 2018	978-1-62692-871-8
3	November 15, 2016	978-4-8030-0966-8	September 11, 2018	978-1-62692-961-6
4	March 15, 2017	978-4-8030-1025-1	November 20, 2018	978-1-62692-937-1
5	June 15, 2017	978-4-8030-1065-7	March 19, 2019	978-1-64275-003-4
6	October 17, 2017	978-4-8030-1121-0	June 25, 2019	978-1-64275-086-7
7	March 15, 2018	978-4-8030-1160-9	November 5, 2019	978-1-64275-722-4
8	July 14, 2018	978-4-8030-1210-1	March 24, 2020	978-1-64505-211-1
9	November 15, 2018	978-4-8030-1252-1	July 7, 2020	978-1-64505-487-0
10	March 15, 2019	978-4-8030-1281-1	September 29, 2020	978-1-64505-721-5
11	July 16, 2019	978-4-8030-1314-6	December 22, 2020	978-1-64505-792-5
12	October 12, 2019	978-4-8030-1349-8	April 6, 2021	978-1-64505-818-2
13	March 14, 2020	978-4-8030-1400-6	August 3, 2021	978-1-64827-201-1
14	January 7, 2021	978-4-7575-7024-5	October 4, 2022	978-1-64827-299-8
15	June 7, 2021	978-4-7575-7309-3	March 7, 2023	978-1-64827-466-4
16	December 7, 2021	978-4-7575-7619-3	July 25, 2023	978-1-63858-363-9
17	July 7, 2022	978-4-7575-8021-3	January 2, 2024	978-1-68579-659-4
18	March 7, 2023	978-4-7575-8457-0	May 28, 2024	979-8-88843-636-3
19	May 7, 2024	978-4-7575-9182-0	February 18, 2025	979-8-89160-629-6
20	February 6, 2025	978-4-7575-9664-1	November 11, 2025	979-8-89561-667-3
21	December 5, 2025	978-4-301-00216-1	November 24, 2026	979-8-89765-395-9

=== Manga ===
A manga adaptation with art by Neko Mint began serialization online on Earth Star Entertainment's Comic Earth Star website on August 5, 2016. Seven Seas announced on September 11, 2017, that they had licensed the manga.

A spin-off manga titled Didn't I Say to Make My Abilities Average in the Next Life?! Everyday Misadventures! began serialization in Comic Earth Star in July 2019. In April 2020, Seven Seas Entertainment announced their license to the spin-off manga.

No.	Original release date	Original ISBN	English release date	English ISBN
1	March 15, 2017	978-4-8030-1009-1	July 24, 2018	978-1-62692-872-5
2	October 17, 2017	978-4-8030-1117-3	December 24, 2018	978-1-62692-953-1
3	June 12, 2018	978-4-8030-1200-2	May 21, 2019	978-1-64275-084-3
4	October 12, 2019	978-4-8030-1343-6	October 20, 2020	978-1-64275-750-7

A second manga adaptation of the light novels illustrated by iimAn began serialization on Square Enix's Gangan Online manga website on December 1, 2021. The manga is set to end with the release of its fifth volume in Winter 2023.

=== Anime ===
An anime adaptation was announced via Twitter on February 26, 2018. The anime, later confirmed to be a television series, is directed by Masahiko Ohta, written by Takashi Aoshima, and animated by Project No.9, with Sō Watanabe as character designer and Yasuhiro Misawa as music composer. The series aired from October 7 to December 23, 2019, on AT-X, Tokyo MX, BS11, TVA, and ABC. Azumi Waki, Sora Tokui, Fumiko Uchimura, and Masumi Tazawa performed the series' opening theme song "Smile Skill=Sukisukiskill", while Waki performed the series' ending theme song "Genzai ↑ Banzai ↑". The series is streamed by Crunchyroll worldwide outside of Asia. The anime covers the first four volumes of the novel series.

No.	Title (Note: All English titles are taken from Crunchyroll.)	Original release date
1	"You Said I'd Get a Do-Over in a New World!"; Transliteration: "Shintenchi de Yarinaoshi tte Itta yo ne!" (Japanese: 新天地でやり直しって言ったよね！)	October 7, 2019
After being run over by a truck and being offered the chance to be reincarnated in a parallel world, Misato Akihara, who felt unhappy in life due to her high intellect, asks that she be reincarnated with average abilities. Reborn as a noble named Adele von Ascham, the girl, going under the alias "Mile", travels to the capital of Tis to start an average life, accompanied by a flying cat-like creature named Nano that only she can see. She stays in an inn run by a girl named Lenny and her parents. Learning that several children have gone missing, with Lenny being next, Mile goes to search for them, encountering Mavis von Austien the knight, and Reina the mage, on the way. Finding the missing children along with a merchant named Pauline, though Lenny is not among them, the girls confront the kidnappers and their leader, Arledy, who has an obsession for young girls. Arledy's henchmen prove to be too powerful for the girls. When her small stature is insulted, Mile, whose abilities are actually the average of all magical creatures in the world, inadvertently uses her overly powerful magic to defeat the kidnappers with ease, but she leaves in tears as she doesn't like having an unordinary life while Nano tries to convince her to accept it. The next day, Mile bids farewell to Lenny (who was never kidnapped, but actually came back late from an errand) and begins attending Hunter's Prep School, discovering that Mavis, Reina, and Pauline are all her roommates.
2	"Didn't I Say the Four of Us Would Be a Party?!"; Transliteration: "Yonin de Pātī tte Itta yo ne!" (Japanese: 四人でパーティーって言ったよね！)	October 14, 2019
As lessons begin, Mile tries to hold back her abilities to appear average, only to make her roommates even more suspicious of her. Later, as the girls form a party and go on a quest to hunt some horned rabbits, Mile decides to train the others to become stronger in the hopes that she'll stand out less. Just as they complete their assignment, the girls are ambushed by a group of rock golems but manage to defeat them with what they've newly learned. Meanwhile, Arledy's group have escaped prison and begin plotting revenge on the girls.
3	"Didn't I Say to Make My Graduation Plain and Simple?!"; Transliteration: "Sotsugyō wa Jimi ni tte Itta yo ne!" (Japanese: 卒業は地味にって言ったよね！)	October 21, 2019
After six months have passed, the girls make plans to form an official party following graduation. With the school faced with closure, the principal asks the girls to take part in the graduation's mock battle against B-rank hunters and win against them. On the day of the battle, Mile is approached by Arledy, the one behind the closure, having done this in retaliation for her operation being thwarted, who offers to revoke the closure on the condition that she become hers if her party can't win without any losses. To both of their surprise, however, Mavis, Pauline, and Reina all manage to win their battles with the skills they learned in the past six months. For the final battle, Arledy steps in to fight Mile herself, but quickly surrenders after witnessing Mile's power first hand. As a result, she and her goons are rearrested. The girls are invited to join separate parties, but they decline as they decide to form their own party: the Crimson Vow. The next day, they are surrounded by many admirers.
4	"Didn't I Say This Was the Crimson Vow's First Step?!"; Transliteration: "Akaki chikai no Daiippo tte Itta yo ne!" (Japanese: 赤き誓いの第一歩って言ったよね！)	October 28, 2019
After their graduation, Crimson Vow begins to undertake Hunter quests in order to cover their living expenses. They use Lenny's inn as their base, but also have to work there as waitresses to pay their rent. After a few gathering quests and dealing with a shady merchant who is known to swindle adventurers, they accept an assignment as guards for a caravan, where they befriend an old merchant. After an embarrassing incident with their garments, the Crimson Vow prove their worth by handily defeating an attacking robber band, their wizard ally, and his upgraded rock golem. During the fight, however, Reina reveals an overly intense hatred for bandits, though her party members stop her from killing the leader.
5	"Didn't I Say That We're Doing Everyone's Backstories?!"; Transliteration: "Minna no Mukashibanashi tte Itta yo ne!" (Japanese: みんなの昔話って言ったよね！)	November 4, 2019
One night, during a camp break, Mile, Reina, Mavis, and Pauline tell each other their background stories. Reina, a peddler's daughter, has come to hate bandits since such people first killed her father and then the Crimson Lightning, an adventuring Hunter band who had taken her in, leading to the revelation of her magical abilities. Crimson Lighting was murdered after the merchant the hired them betrayed them to a group of bandits, leading Reina to murder them. Mavis lost her mother and ran away from her noble home when her father and brothers denied her desire to follow in their footsteps as a knight. Pauline is the daughter of a well-to-do merchant who was murdered and his business annexed by his treacherous head clerk, driving her into becoming a hunter in order to avenge her father. On her part, Mile tells of her story as Adele von Ascham, how her mother and grandfather were murdered by her wicked father and she was mistreated by her new stepmother and stepsister. After meeting Nano, who is actually made from nano machines, she left home for good and made her first friends at Eckland Academy until an incident with her magical powers caught the king's attention, forcing her to run away and adopt her new identity as Mile.
6	"Didn't I Say I'm Not Going Into the Forest Anymore?!"; Transliteration: "Mō mori e nante ikanai tte Itta yo ne!" (Japanese: もう森へなんて行かないって言ったよね！)	November 11, 2019
The merchants escorted by Crimson Vow make it safely to their destination, where they meet the old merchant's granddaughter, Anne. Right afterward, the merchants must deliver another shipment, but on their way, they are beset and murdered by bandits. Determined to avenge them, Reina makes off into the woods on her own, followed by Mile, Mavis, and Pauline. The girls discover that the bandits are actually soldiers from the neighboring Albarn Empire assigned to disrupt Amroth's trade revenues, and defeat them all, at the same time stopping Reina from killing their leader. The old merchant also turns out to be alive, having by sheer chance evaded the attack, and is happily reunited with his granddaughter.
7	"Didn't I Say We Should Take Breaks Sometimes?!"; Transliteration: "Tama ni wa kyūka tte Itta yo ne!" (Japanese: たまには休暇って言ったよね！)	November 18, 2019
After their successes on the road, Crimson Vow decides to take a break. At a loss at what to do, Mile decides to go to the beach, and tailors new bathing suits for herself and the other girls, although this causes a slight scandal when these turn out to be too revealing for this world's fashion sense. But as they return to their inn, Pauline backs off the group and disappears after spotting a soldier lurking in an alleyway.
8	"No One Mentioned That Pauline's Getting Married, Did They?!"; Transliteration: "Pōrin ga kekkon tte Itte nai yo ne?!" (Japanese: ポーリンが結婚って言ってないよね？！)	November 25, 2019
Just as Mile, Reina, and Mavis are wondering where Pauline has gone, they receive a letter from Mavis' family, telling them that her third-eldest brother is marrying Pauline. However, this is just a ploy by her father's former head clerk and his friend, Viscount Boardman, to form bonds with a prestigious family line, and to ensure Pauline's cooperation, they hold her mother and younger brother hostage. In order to stop this insidious scheme, Mile, Reina and Mavis invade the Beckett estate, and Mavis' father, Count Austien, calls for a trial by combat, which Pauline easily wins. When Count Austin demands that Mavis returns home, she refuses, forcing Mile into a trial by combat against the Count. After being defeated, the Count finally gives in and approves of Mavis' career choice. While leaving, Pauline considers her teammates as an additional family.
9	"Didn't I Say Wyvern Hunting?!"; Transliteration: "Waibān tōbatsu tte Itta yo ne?!" (Japanese: ワイバーン討伐って言ったよね?!)	December 2, 2019
Tired out by the workload, Lenny heaps upon them at their inn (in exchange for a reduction of their rent), Crimson Vow takes up a Wyvern hunting quest, despite Wyverns being exceedingly difficult hunting targets. They visit the village in whose vicinity the Wyvern in question has settled, and bring it down after Mile employs several airborne attacks using her teammates as living missiles. However, before they can kill it, they are stopped by Booneclift, a royal mage who befriended the Wyvern, whom he named Lobreth, in his youth. With those two old friends happily reunited, and with Booneclift generously recompensing all parties involved, Crimson Vow fulfills their long-desired dream of erecting a private bathouse on the inn's grounds, since the inn did not have one in the first place. Lenny also joins them in the baths.
10	"Didn't I Say Surprises Should Be Kept Secret!?"; Transliteration: "Sapuraizu wa naisho de tte Itta yo ne!" (Japanese: サプライズは内緒でって言ったよね！)	December 9, 2019
While celebrating Lenny's 11th birthday, Mile wistfully thinks back to the first birthday she had ever spent with friends at Eckland Academy, prompting the rest of Crimson Vow to prepare their own surprise party for Mile. However, to do so, they have to gather funds on their own without telling her, making Mile become obsessed with the idea that the others are abandoning her. Still, even after the secret comes out, the party comes to pass - until a relieving Mile confesses to having committed some minor transgressions against her own teammates.
11	"Didn't I Say Arrogance Leads to Trouble!?"; Transliteration: "Manshin wa kinmotsu tte Itta yo ne!" (Japanese: 慢心は禁物って言ったよね！)	December 16, 2019
Wishing to prove to Mile that they are not too dependent on her for help, Reina, Pauline and Mavis decide to accept a particularly difficult quest: finding an investigation team gone lost while exploring the peculiar fluctuations of a nearby forest's monster population. As they enter the forest, Crimson Vow discovers that some powerful creature has settled in the deepest part of the woods and subjugated the local beast people as its servants. They encounter and fight the beast people who are attempting to stop them. After freeing most of the investigation team, they go after their leader, an elf scholar named Cu Leleia, still held captive in a set of ruins being excavated by the beast people. However, there they are forced to discover that their opponent is an elder dragon, one of the most powerful creatures in this world, and Mile ends up fatally wounded.
12	"Didn't I Say The Crimson Vow Would Never Be Destroyed!?"; Transliteration: "Akaki chikai wa fumetsu tte Itta yo ne!" (Japanese: 赤き誓いは不滅って言ったよね！)	December 23, 2019
As she lies dying, mired in self-doubt, Mile recovers upon seeing her friends fighting for their lives, and with her newfound determination she manages to boost her magical power, easily defeating the elder dragon and two of its congeners. From the dragons, Crimson Vow learns that they were seeking to unearth the remnants of a prior, more advanced civilization that died out when it could not develop any further, but since there was nothing in the ruins, they decide to end their operations; however, they refuse to say what their goals are. Although they and Nano, a remnant of that lost culture, refuse to divulge their motives, Mile eventually deduces that they might be looking for that civilization's lost weapons to increase their power. Crimson Vow bid farewell to Cu Leleia, who hopes to meet them again. After enjoying the public baths, Mile decides to leave on her own in order to discover their plans and perhaps save the world, only to find Reina, Pauline, and Mavis joining her willingly on her new quest.

== See also ==
- I Shall Survive Using Potions!, another light novel series by FUNA
- Saving 80,000 Gold in Another World for My Retirement, another light novel series by FUNA
