= Fumiko Uchimura =

Japanese voice actress

- 内村 史子
- Born: December 16; Kagoshima Prefecture, Japan
- Occupation: Voice actress
- Years active: 2010–present
- Agent: VIMS
- Notable work: Riddle Story of Devil as Haruki Sagae; Didn't I Say to Make My Abilities Average in the Next Life?! as Mavis von Austien; How Not to Summon a Demon Lord as Horn

Fumiko Uchimura (内村 史子, Uchimura Fumiko; born December 16) is a Japanese voice actress from Kagoshima Prefecture who is affiliated with VIMS. She began her career in 2010 after graduating from the Japan Narration Actor Institute, and in 2014 she played her first named anime role as Haruki Sagae in Riddle Story of Devil. She is also known for her roles as Mavis von Austien in Didn't I Say to Make My Abilities Average in the Next Life?! and Horn in How Not to Summon a Demon Lord.

== Filmography ==
=== Anime ===
2014

- Riddle Story of Devil as Haruki Sagae
- Wolf Girl and Black Prince as Female Student (episodes 1–2)
- Brynhildr in the Darkness as Student (episode 1), Female Student (episode 9)
- Recently, My Sister is Unusual as Football club captain, Child B
- Blade & Soul as Reika (episode 7)

2015

- Unlimited Fafnir as Ren Miyazawa

2016

- Prince of Stride: Alternative as Girl (episode 12)
- Mob Psycho 100 as Yankee woman A (episode 2)

2017

- Clockwork Planet as Caster
- Dive!! as Reiji Maruyama (child)

2018

- How Not to Summon a Demon Lord as Receptionist (episode 2), Slave A (episode 6), Servant (episode 9), Alicia's mother (episode 10), Boy (episode 12), Takuma Sakamoto (young)
- Rascal Does Not Dream of Bunny Girl Senpai as Rena Kashiba

2019

- Didn't I Say to Make My Abilities Average in the Next Life?! as Mavis von Austien

2021

- The Hidden Dungeon Only I Can Enter as Amane
- How Not to Summon a Demon Lord Omega as Horn
- Tropical-Rouge! Pretty Cure as Yumi Kuwano

2022

- Beast Tamer as Child
- Komi Can't Communicate as Mikuni Katō
