= The Iceblade Sorcerer Shall Rule the World =

Japanese light novel series

- First light novel volume cover, featuring Amelia Rose (left) and Ray White (right)

冰剣の魔術師が世界を統べる〜世界最強の魔術師である少年は、魔術学院に入学する〜 (Hyōken no Majutsushi ga Sekai o Suberu: Sekai Saikyō no Majutsushi de Aru Shōnen wa, Majutsu Gakuin ni Nyūgaku Suru)
- Genre: Adventure, fantasy
- Novel series
- Written by: Nana Mikoshiba
- Published by: Shōsetsuka ni Narō
- Original run: October 25, 2019 – present
- Light novel
- Written by: Nana Mikoshiba
- Illustrated by: Riko Korie
- Published by: Kodansha
- Imprint: Kodansha Ranobe Bunko
- Original run: July 2, 2020 – present
- Volumes: 10
- Manga
- Written by: Nana Mikoshiba
- Illustrated by: Norihito Sasaki
- Published by: Kodansha
- English publisher: NA: Kodansha USA
- Magazine: Magazine Pocket
- Original run: June 24, 2020 – January 31, 2024
- Volumes: 16
- Anime television series
- Directed by: Masahiro Takata
- Written by: Masahiro Takata
- Music by: Tatsuhiko Saiki; Natsumi Tabuchi
- Studio: Cloud Hearts
- Licensed by: Crunchyroll: SA/SEA: Medialink
- Original network: TBS, BS11
- Original run: January 6, 2023 – March 24, 2023
- Episodes: 12
- Manga

The Iceblade Sorcerer Shall Rule the World II
- Written by: Nana Mikoshiba; Ishiya Ōgane (composition)
- Illustrated by: Nao Kagami
- Published by: Kodansha
- Magazine: Suiyōbi no Sirius
- Original run: May 27, 2026 – present
- Anime television series

The Iceblade Sorcerer Shall Rule the World II
- Directed by: Masahiro Takata
- Written by: Masahiro Takata (Note: Series composition (シリーズ構成).); Ishiya Oogane (Note: Composition (構成).)
- Studio: Zero-G
- Licensed by: Crunchyroll
- Original network: TBS, BS11
- Original run: October 8, 2026 – present
- icon

The Iceblade Sorcerer Shall Rule the World (Japanese: 冰剣の魔術師が世界を統べる〜世界最強の魔術師である少年は、魔術学院に入学する〜, Hepburn: Hyōken no Majutsushi ga Sekai o Suberu: Sekai Saikyō no Majutsushi de Aru Shōnen wa, Majutsu Gakuin ni Nyūgaku Suru) is a Japanese light novel series written by Nana Mikoshiba and illustrated by Riko Korie. It has been published online via the user-generated novel publishing website Shōsetsuka ni Narō since October 2019. It was later acquired by Kodansha, who has released the series since July 2020 under their Kodansha Ranobe Bunko imprint.

A manga adaptation illustrated by Norihito Sasaki was serialized on Kodansha's Magazine Pocket website and app from June 2020 to January 2024. An anime television series adaptation produced by Cloud Hearts aired from January to March 2023. A second season titled, The Iceblade Sorcerer Shall Rule the World II (冰剣の魔術師が世界を統べるII, Hyōken no Majutsushi ga Sekai o Suberu II), produced by Zero-G premiered in October 2026.

== Premise ==
After winning a terrible war, Iceblade Sorcerer Ray White decides to enroll in Arnold Academy, but in the guise of a commoner, causing those with higher class upbringings to look down on him. Despite this, he manages to make friends quickly and must solve a conspiracy that plagues the school.

== Characters ==
Ray White (レイ = ホワイト, Rei Howaito)
Voiced by: Junya Enoki (Japanese); Kevin D. Thelwell (English)
Amelia Rose (アメリア = ローズ, Ameria Rōzu)
Voiced by: Iori Saeki (Japanese); Alexis Tipton (English)
Elisa Griffith (エリサ = グリフィス, Erisa Gurifisu)
Voiced by: Nana Harumura (season 1), Miyu Kubota (season 2) (Japanese); Emi Lo (English)
Rebecca Bradley (レベッカ = ブラッドリィ, Rebekka Buraddori)
Voiced by: Azumi Waki (Japanese); Macy Anne Johnson (English)
Clarisse/Claris Cleveland (クラリス = クリーヴランド, Kurarisu Kurīvurando)
Voiced by: Kaede Hondo (Japanese); Sarah Wiedenheft (English)
Ariane Algren/Olgren (アリアーヌ = オルグレン, Ariānu Oruguren)
Voiced by: Akira Sekine (Japanese); Marianne Bray (English)
Lydia Ainsworth (リディア = エインズワース, Ridia Einzuwāsu)
Voiced by: Atsumi Tanezaki (Japanese); Monét Lerner (English)
Abby/Abbie Garnet (アビー = ガーネット, Abī Gānetto)
Voiced by: Nanako Mori (Japanese); Natalie Van Sistine (English)
Carol Caroline (キャロル = キャロライン, Kyaroru Kyarorain)
Voiced by: Maaya Uchida (Japanese); Molly Searcy (English)
Evi Armstrong (エヴィ = アームストロング, Evi Āmusutorongu)
Voiced by: Yūichirō Umehara (Japanese); Clifford Chapin (English)
Albert Allium (アルバート = アリウム, Arubāto Ariumu)
Voiced by: Kōhei Amasaki (Japanese); Christopher Wehkamp (English)
Olivia Arnold (オリヴィア = アーノルド, Orivia Ānorudo)
Voiced by: Hana Hishikawa (Japanese); Grace Hartman (English)
Stella White (ステラ = ホワイト, Sutera Howaito)
Voiced by: Atsumi Tanezaki (Japanese); Dusty Feeney (English)
Lucas Forst (ルーカス = フォルスト, Rūkasu Forusuto)
Voiced by: Sōichirō Hoshi (Japanese); Paul Cline (English)
Lieselotte Eden (リーゼロッテ = エーデン, Rīzerotte Ēden)
Voiced by: Haruka Shiraishi (Japanese); Anastasia Muñoz (English)
Julius Orphe (ユリウス = オルフェ, Yuriusu Orufe)
Voiced by: Ryōhei Kimura
Bianca Miller (ビアンカ = ミラー, Bianka Mirā)
Voiced by: Aoi Koga
Emma Clarke (エマ = クラーク, Ema Kurāku)
Voiced by: Konomi Kohara (Japanese); Kim Rivera (English)
Maria Bradley (マリア = ブラッドリィ, Maria Buraddori)
Voiced by: Shiki Aoki (Japanese); Kristi Rothrock (English)
Marius Bassett (マリウス = バセット, Mariusu Basetto)
Voiced by: Kazuyuki Okitsu

== Media ==
=== Light novels ===
Written by Nana Mikoshiba, The Iceblade Sorcerer Shall Rule the World began publication in the user-generated novel publishing website Shōsetsuka ni Narō on October 25, 2019. The series was later acquired by Kodansha, which began publishing the novels with illustrations by Riko Korie on July 2, 2020, under its Kodansha Ranobe Bunko imprint. As of July 2026, nine volumes have been released.

No.	Release date	ISBN
1	July 2, 2020	978-4-06-519122-4
2	November 2, 2020	978-4-04-073253-4
3	July 2, 2021	978-4-04-073473-6
4	December 2, 2021	978-4-06-526059-3
5	May 2, 2022	978-4-04-073948-9
6	October 3, 2022	978-4-06-529631-8
7	December 28, 2022	978-4-06-530553-9
8	December 1, 2023	978-4-06-534087-5
9	June 2, 2026	978-4-06-543622-6
10	December 2, 2026	978-4-06-546408-3

=== Manga ===
A manga adaptation illustrated by Norihito Sasaki was serialized in Kodansha's Magazine Pocket website and app from June 24, 2020, to January 31, 2024. 16 tankōbon volumes were released from November 2020 to April 2024. In North America, Kodansha USA has licensed the manga for English publication.

A sequel to the manga adaptation illustrated by Nao Kagami with composition by Ishiya Ōgane, titled Iceblade Sorcerer Shall Rule the World II, began serialization in Kodansha's Niconico Seiga–based manga service Suiyōbi no Sirius on May 27, 2026.

No.	Original release date	Original ISBN	English release date	English ISBN
1	November 9, 2020	978-4-06-521300-1	November 30, 2021 (digital); August 9, 2022 (print)	978-1-64-651561-5
2	January 8, 2021	978-4-06-522521-9	December 28, 2021 (digital); October 11, 2022 (print)	978-1-64-651625-4
3	April 9, 2021	978-4-06-522876-0	January 3, 2023	978-1-64-651626-1
4	July 9, 2021	978-4-06-524018-2	February 14, 2023	978-1-64-651627-8
5	September 9, 2021	978-4-06-524826-3	April 18, 2023 (digital); April 25, 2023 (print)	978-1-64-651628-5
6	October 8, 2021	978-4-06-525132-4	July 25, 2023 (digital); August 1, 2023 (print)	978-1-64-651629-2
7	January 7, 2022	978-4-06-526593-2	October 24, 2023 (digital); October 31, 2023 (print)	978-1-64-651630-8
8	May 9, 2022	978-4-06-527842-0	January 23, 2024	978-1-64-651795-4
9	July 8, 2022	978-4-06-528384-4	April 23, 2024 (digital); April 30, 2024 (print)	978-1-64-651825-8
10	October 7, 2022	978-4-06-529404-8	August 13, 2024	978-1-64-651953-8
11	January 6, 2023	978-4-06-530333-7	October 22, 2024	978-1-64-651989-7
12	April 7, 2023	978-4-06-531038-0	January 21, 2025	979-8-88-877070-2
13	August 8, 2023	978-4-06-532597-1	June 2, 2026	979-8-88-877208-9
14	November 9, 2023	978-4-06-533507-9	—	—
15	February 8, 2024	978-4-06-534170-4	—	—
16	April 9, 2024	978-4-06-535158-1	—	—

=== Anime ===
An anime television series adaptation was announced in April 2022. The series is produced by Cloud Hearts, with supervision from Yokohama Animation Laboratory, and is directed by Masahiro Takata, who supervised the scripts and directed the sound. Makoto Shimojima handled the character designs, while Tatsuhiko Saiki and Natsumi Tabuchi composed the music. It aired from January 6 to March 24, 2023, on TBS and BS11. The opening theme song is "Dystopia" by the musical project Sizuk, and the ending theme song is "Loud Hailer" (ラウドヘイラー, Raudoheirā) by Maaya Uchida. Crunchyroll is streaming the series. Medialink licensed the series in Asia-Pacific.

A second season was announced on May 22, 2026. It will be produced by Zero-G, with Masahiro Takata returning to direct, handle the series composition, and serve as sound director. The season premiered on October 8, 2026. The opening theme song is "Diamond Dust" by Sizuk, and the ending theme song is "Compression :[" by Maaya Uchida.

=== Season 1 (2023) ===
No.	Title	Directed by	Written by	Storyboarded by	Original release date
1	"The Boy Who Became the World's Strongest Sorcerer Enters the Academy of Sorcery"; Transliteration: "Sekai Saikyō no Majutsushi de Aru Shōnen wa, Majutsu Gakuin ni Nyūgaku Suru" (Japanese: 世界最強の魔術師である少年は、魔術学院に入学する)	Masato Uchibori	Masahiro Takata	Masahiro Takata	January 6, 2023 (Note: This episode aired at 1:58 a.m. JST, 30 minutes after the original air time on TBS.)
A young man named Ray White enters the Arnold Academy of Sorcery and is treated with hostility by the noble students since Ray was born a commoner. Despite particular hostility from noble Albert Alium, Ray makes friends with Amelia Rose, one of the academy's most noble students. Ray has several flashbacks to a terrible war. He learns about the Seven Grand Sorcerers; four remain completely anonymous, one is Academy principal Abbie Garnet, one is famous researcher Carol Caroline, and the last, the Iceblade Sorcerer, vanished after ending the Far East War. Ray struggles with learning the basics of magic, causing his bullies to nickname him Withered (Wizard). Ray also meets classmate Elisa Griffith; a half-elven girl, Evi Armstrong; his fitness obsessed roommate, Rebecca Bradley, another high nobility student; and hyperactive minor noble Claris Cleveland. Ray attends a meeting with principal Abbie, who despite Ray's youth was somehow his commander in the military during the Far East War. During dueling practice, Albert attempts to beat Ray in a duel, but Ray turns out to be an expert swordsman and Albert is humiliated. A watching Abbie reveals Ray is actually the missing Iceblade Sorcerer.
2	"The Boy Who Became the World's Strongest Sorcerer Begins His Practical Exercise"; Transliteration: "Sekai Saikyō no Majutsushi de Aru Shōnen wa, Enshū o Kaishi Suru" (Japanese: 世界最強の魔術師である少年は、演習を開始する)	Tamaki Nakatsu	Takahiro Nagase	Tamaki Nakatsu	January 13, 2023
Seeking to enjoy his youthful life, Ray joins the Environmental Research Club, which is composed of muscle-bound fitness enthusiasts who seek dangerous environments to train in, while revealing Ray has a Gold-class hunter license. He also joins the Gardening club with Rebecca, but must convince club secretary Dina by turning a field of weeds into a flower garden. Despite Dina's distaste, he succeeds. Rebecca suggests Ray compete in the Magic Chevalier Tournament. Abbie informs Ray an Imperial spy has infiltrated the academy and must be neutralized. Claris is pleasantly surprised that Ray considers her a friend. Students are expected to complete a forest skills course in teams of four. Ray forms a team with Evi, Elisa and Amelia, infuriating Albert. Teams must survive a monster-filled forest for 24 hours and collect stamps from key areas. As a farmer, Ray is already an expert and their team passes with time to spare. Reflecting on the war, Ray feels guilty for enjoying his new life while hiding his real identity. Ray saves Albert's team from a giant monster, and Amelia is shocked that he defeated the monster alone. A concealed spy enchants the monster, resurrecting it stronger than before.
3	"The Boy Who Became the World's Strongest Sorcerer Enjoys a Day Off"; Transliteration: "Sekai Saikyō no Majutsushi de Aru Shōnen wa, Kyūjitsu o Ōka Suru" (Japanese: 世界最強の魔術師である少年は、休日を謳歌する)	Mitsuyo Yokono	Kōtarō Shimoyama	Daiji Iwanaga	January 20, 2023
Despite its strength, Ray defeats the monster again, impressing everyone except the other nobles including Albert, who grows even angrier. Ray visits his paraplegic master, Lydia, where they discuss her research into Engrams in the brain that make magic possible. She also warns him of Eugenics: fanatics seeking power who kill sorcerers by cutting into their brains to steal their magic. Lydia is pleased Ray made friends but disappointed he won't compete in the Magic Chevalier tournament against other academies. Ray accompanies Elisa to the public library where they discuss Ainsworth, an early researcher of Engram and Elisa's idol. Ray reveals he enjoys the romance novels of Luna Etel. Claris spots them and is invited to join them, becoming friends with Elisa. After the girls leave, Ray encounters Amelia, who takes him clothes shopping. After a spider scares her, Amelia accidentally exposes herself to Ray in her bra and panties, but finds out he didn't really care if he saw her. Ray meets academy instructor Helena Grady or Miss Gray for short, a former student of Ray's from his past as the Iceblade Sorcerer, determined to help Ray relearn his lost abilities. Meanwhile, Albert begins serious training to defeat Ray, watched over by the spy from the forest.
4	"The Boy Who Became the World's Strongest Sorcerer Releases His Secret Power"; Transliteration: "Sekai Saikyō no Majutsushi de Aru Shōnen wa, Himeta Chikara o Kaihō Suru" (Japanese: 世界最強の魔術師である少年は、秘めた力を解放する)	Shin Jae ik	Tomoko Shinozuka	Meigo Naitō	January 27, 2023
Ray accidentally sees Rebecca in bunny rabbit panties. Despite her embarrassment, Rebecca isn't angry as Ray is the only person who isn't intimidated by her noble title. Amelia is the favourite to win at the upcoming tournament. Amelia decides to duel Ray who almost wins easily, but something stops him landing the winning hit, confusing her. Albert demands a duel, but with real swords and magic allowed. With the spy watching, Albert attempts to kill Ray and prove nobles are superior, but Ray shows he can cut through magic, leaving Albert powerless. Amelia demands to know Ray's real identity, but before he can tell his friends the truth, the spy paralyzes everyone and is revealed to be Miss Gray. She confesses that she is a member of Eugenics who is behind the disappearance of several students and now desires the powerful Engram from Ray's unique brain. With his friends at risk, Ray is forced to unlock a sealing spell, restoring his power as the Iceblade Sorcerer, defeating her. Miss Gray tries to invite him to join Eugenics, but he refuses. Refusing to be taken alive, she inserts a Eugenics scientific tool into her own brain, turning herself into a monster.
5	"The Boy Who Became the World's Strongest Sorcerer Has an Unexpected Meeting on the Battlefield"; Transliteration: "Sekai Saikyō no Majutsushi de Aru Shōnen wa, Senjō de Kaigō Suru" (Japanese: 世界最強の魔術師である少年は、戦場で邂逅する)	Nobuhiro Mutō	Masahiro Takata	Masahiro Takata	February 3, 2023
Ray reveals the strength of the Iceblade Sorcerer actually lies in Anti-Material magic that can transform any magic power into another, in Ray's case, Ice. Miss Gray is frozen solid and Ray passes out. In the past, the previous Ice Blade Sorcerer, Lydia Ainsworth, took in Ray as a war orphan. Ray learned Ice magic from Lydia and fought in the Far East War, but eventually suffered a PTSD breakdown. Ray awakens in hospital with Lydia who assures him his friends are fine. As his friends know the truth, Ray explains everything. During his last battle he suffered an Overheat, a loss of control of the Engram in his brain. The resulting Ice explosion killed enough soldiers to end the Far East War, but also put Lydia in a wheelchair. The only thing keeping Overheat from happening again is Chronos-Lock, a spell that limits Ray's ability to use magic. His friends insist it changes nothing. Albert apologizes to Ray for everything, having realized nobility is less important than honest effort and self-improvement. To Ray's considerable dismay, Miss Gray is replaced by Grand Sorcerer Carol Caroline, his superior from the war who helped Lydia raise him like an overly doting aunt.
6	"The Boy Who Became the World's Strongest Sorcerer Dons a Mask"; Transliteration: "Sekai Saikyō no Majutsushi de Aru Shōnen wa, Kamen o Sōchaku Suru" (Japanese: 世界最強の魔術師である少年は、仮面を装着する)	Yoshihide Ibata	Tomoko Shinozuka	Yoshihide Ibata	February 10, 2023
Amelia struggles with guilt over Ray, who endured a painful childhood while she did not. Ray complains about Carol who is impossible to deal with, but Abbie ignores him since Carol can protect the academy. It is clear to Ray that Amelia is not looking forward to the tournament. He learns from Rebecca that Amelia is expected to honor her family, the top ranked noble family, by defeating the daughter of the second ranked family, Ariane Algren of Diom Academy. Amelia and Ariane were childhood friends, but Amelia's jealousy of Ariane's skills drove them apart, for which Amelia feels guilty. Ray offers to teach Amelia how Lydia once taught him, a method he calls Ainsworth's Bootcamp. Amelia regretfully discovers bootcamp involves grueling physical exercise, with no magic allowed, while Ray yells insults and abuse. Albert suffers from lack of confidence, but Ray reassures him his new self-improvement attitude will lead to greater strength. Amelia tries to escape bootcamp, but is dragged back by Ray; Amelia becomes flustered as Ray drags her back holding her hand. Ray recruits the muscle bound Environmental Research Club as cheerleaders for Amelia. Ray disguises himself as a girl to infiltrate Diom Academy and meet Ariane only to meet a lost little girl resembling Ariane.
7	"The Girl Who Became the World's Strongest Sorcerer Infiltrates a Sorcery Academy"; Transliteration: "Sekai Saikyō no Majutsushi de Aru Shōjo wa, Majutsu Gakuin ni Sennyū Suru" (Japanese: 世界最強の魔術師である少女は、魔術学院に潜入する)	Yoshihide Ibata	Takahiro Nagase	Tamaki Nakatsu	February 17, 2023
Ray, calling himself Lily, takes the lost little girl later revealed to be Ariane's little sister, Tiana to meet Ariane. He reveals who he is and that he is friends with Amelia. Ariane has missed Amelia greatly and looks forward to seeing her at the tournament. Ray returns home, still disguised as Lily, and encounters Maria, Rebecca's younger sister who is determined to attend the academy, especially after developing a crush on "Lily". Ray takes his friends to meet Lydia, who gives the star-struck Elisa her autograph before insisting on talking to Amelia privately. Ray learns from Lydia's maid, Carla that Grim Reaper, an assassination squad from Avil Empire, may infiltrate the tournament for easy access to all the attending nobles. Lydia knows Amelia is hiding a secret, which has Ray worried about her, and assures her Ray can be trusted should she ever tell him the truth. Ray offers Amelia a chance to graduate boot camp if she cuts the target on his chest in a duel, though the result is not shown. The tournament arrives and Amelia easily reaches the semi-finals. Albert demonstrates his now exceptional skills and bravery but loses his match against Ariane, meaning Ariane faces Amelia in the finals. A Grim Reaper assassin follows Ray in secret.
8	"The Boy Who Became the World's Strongest Sorcerer Inspires the Rose"; Transliteration: "Sekai Saikyō no Majutsushi de Aru Shōnen wa, Bara o Kobu Suru" (Japanese: 世界最強の魔術師である少年は、薔薇を鼓舞する)	Masahiro Takata	Takahiro Nagase	Yoshihide Ibata	February 24, 2023
The assassin abruptly disappears. At a secret meeting with Lydia, Carol, Abbie and Environmental Research president Lex, Ray learns of the Hale Tribe, Imperial intelligence gatherers, of whom Lydia's maid, Carla is a member as well as Lex, Carla's little brother who dealt with the assassin. Ray is asked to prevent the assassination of noble students. Ray takes notice of Lucas Forst, a strong swordswoman from Mercross Academy. Amelia begins isolating herself until Ray begs her to trust him with her secret. Amelia reveals the pressure of maintaining her family's noble standards plus feelings of inferiority have caused suicidal thoughts and a certainty she will never surpass Ariane. Ray assures her support from friends is all she needs, revealing Amelia did in fact graduate boot camp by destroying Ray's target. The next morning while Amelia and Ariane begin their match Grim Reaper kidnaps Claris and eight other students. Ray tracks them under the arena and releases his Chronos-Lock, capturing the assassins in ice and saving everyone. In the arena Amelia is knocked down repeatedly, but inspired by Ray's words she evolves a new spell she names Butterfly Effect, claiming she is now too strong for Ariane to even touch her.
9	"The Boy Who Became the World's Strongest Sorcerer Releases the Binds"; Transliteration: "Sekai Saikyō no Majutsushi de Aru Shōnen wa, Jubaku o Kaihō Suru" (Japanese: 世界最強の魔術師である少年は、呪縛を解放する)	Shin'ya Kawabe	Tomoko Shinozuka	Yoshihide Ibata	March 3, 2023
Arianne finds when she gets close to Amelia she is teleported away instead. Carol confirms the spell is an Original unique to Amelia's Engram that manipulates Causality so that no matter where Ariane moves Amelia causes her to move somewhere else. Ray confirms Amelia risks Overheat if she uses the spell too long. Amelia wins the match and the two tearfully reconcile. Ray praises Amelia for her discovery of an Original spell. In the next match Rebecca faces Lucas and loses to his incredible speed. Lucas meets Ray who confirms Lucas inherited the title of Peerless Blade Sorcerer, just as Ray inherited the Iceblade. Lucas intends to defeat Ray once Ray has recovered his former strength by curing his Overheat. Carol interrogates the captured assassins, but they all commit suicide with anti-interrogation devices in their skulls. With the tournament over, the next event is the Cultural Festival. At Amelia's insistence Ray suggests their class run a maid café as Amelia is a secret maid enthusiast. At first this is rejected by the noble girls, furious at the suggestion they role-play as servants, but they agree after seeing Carol model a risqué maid outfit. News arrives that Rebecca has unexpectedly become engaged.
10	"The Boy Who Became the World's Strongest Sorcerer Sets Up a Maid Cafe"; Transliteration: "Sekai Saikyō no Majutsushi de Aru Shōnen wa, Meido Kissa o Junbi Suru" (Japanese: 世界最強の魔術師である少年は、メイド喫茶を準備する)	Noboru Torataka	Masahiro Takata	Meigo Naitō	March 10, 2023 (Note: This episode aired at 2:33 a.m. JST, 1 hour and 5 minutes after the original air time on TBS due to the WBC Baseball coverage extension.)
High ranking Eugenics members target Rebecca as a Vessel. Rebecca suffers with magic in her eyes that make them bleed. A student named Cornea turns the student council against Rebecca since Rebecca's fiancé, Evan Bernstein, was previously Cornea's fiancé. Rebecca's friend Dina asks Ray to investigate Evan whose motives are suspicious. Lydia agrees the engagement is unusual and sends Carla to investigate. Lydia is unhappy Ray has been infected by Amelia's maid fetish during preparation for the maid café. Rebecca continues to bleed from her eyes and dreams of Ray during the war. Her sister Maria questions if she is happy marrying Evan, but Rebecca only confirms it is her duty. Worried, Maria protests the engagement to their parents but is ignored. Ray finally meets Evan who is indeed suspicious. Carla discovers the Bernstein family have not been seen in years and their mansion is abandoned. She thus suspects the Bernsteins, including Evan, are dead and the current Evan is a disguised Eugenics member known as the Sorcery Eye Collector, who undoubtedly wants Rebecca's eyes for his collection. Other Eugenics members hope Rebecca will awaken as the Saint and open the Door to Akasha.
11	"The Boy Who Became the World's Strongest Sorcerer Resonates with the Past"; Transliteration: "Sekai Saikyō no Majutsushi de Aru Shōnen wa, Kako to Kyōmei Suru" (Japanese: 世界最強の魔術師である少年は、過去と共鳴する)	Nobuhiro Mutō	Masahiro Takata	Nobuhiro Mutō	March 17, 2023 (Note: This episode aired at 1:33 a.m. JST, 5 minutes after the original air time on TBS.)
It is revealed Rebecca's father, Bruno made a deal with Evan to marry Rebecca in exchange for replacing the Rose family as the kingdoms highest nobility family, which Evan is enforcing by threatening Maria. Rebecca's visions of Ray's past continue. Rebecca and Ray meet in their dreams, causing Ray's eyes to also bleed. Rebecca almost asks Ray about the war but stops. The culture festival begins and Ray helps at the maid café by disguising himself as Lily to be a maid. Ray later helps Rebecca enjoy the festival so she almost asks him to the end-of-festival fireworks but doesn't. A strange woman warns Maria that Rebecca will die very soon. Ray receives similar news from Lydia who has a plan for Ray to save her, at the secret request of Bruno. Evan kidnaps Rebecca to begin her awakening. Ray and Maria follow to save her while everyone else battles Eugenics and their monsters. A flashback shows Bruno revealing their family is cursed. Every few generations a child is born as something called a Kreuz, and unless she gains control of her eyes she will die before she turns 20 years old.
12	"The Boy Who Became the World's Strongest Sorcerer Unveils Ākāśa"; Transliteration: "Sekai Saikyō no Majutsushi de Aru Shōnen wa, Ākāsha o Kiri Hiraku" (Japanese: 世界最強の魔術師である少年は、真理世界(アーカーシャ)を斬り啓く)	Masahiro Takata	Masahiro Takata	Daiji Iwanaga; Masahiro Takata	March 24, 2023
The Eugenics have arrived for Rebecca's awakening as one of them reveals himself as Evan, while the Evan who "kidnapped" her and is engaged to her reveals herself as Lieselotte Eden, the Fabrication Sorcerer. She then sends Evan to another dimension as Ray arrives to battle Paratrogo, the glutton who devours souls. Meanwhile, Ray's friends are getting exhausted as the rest of the monsters attack them, until Lydia, Carla, Abbie, and Carol save them and finish those monsters off. While Liese defeats Evan in another dimension, things are not looking well for Ray, as Paratrogo unleashes his full power to kill him. Ray then unlocks his ultimate power, Pandora, to finally defeat Paratrogo by freezing him in red ice. Then, after a quarrel between the two sisters, Maria witnesses Rebecca Overheating. Ray wakes up and manages to use Chronos Lock to shut off Rebecca's Overheating, thus saving her life. Later that night, while waiting for Ray to watch some fireworks, Rebecca and Amelia have agreed to compete for Ray's love. The next day, Ray visits the grave of Howard, one of his comrades, with his friends tagging along. Just then, Ariane arrives to invite Ray to join her in the Magicks War, much to his shock. In the post credits, a little girl who appears to be Ray's sister is waiting for him.

=== Season 2 (2026) ===
No.	Title	Directed by	Storyboarded by	Original release date
1	"The Boy Who Is the World's Strongest Sorcerer Participates in a Large Scale Magic Battle Tournament"; Transliteration: "Sekai Saikyō no Majutsushi de Aru Shōnen wa Ookibo Majutsu Sen (Magikusu Uwoo) ni Sanka Suru" (Japanese: 世界最強の魔術師である少年は大規模魔術戦(マギクス・ウォー)に参加する)	Unknown	TBA	October 8, 2026
