= List of anime releases made concurrently in the United States and Japan =

This list comprises anime titles that have been made available in the United States concurrently with its Japanese release, usually via online streaming, along with the source of the release. The list is in chronological order by year and season, and alphabetical order within each season.

== 2008 ==
=== Spring ===
- Blassreiter - Crunchyroll (now licensed by Funimation)
- The Tower of Druaga ~Aegis of Uruk~ - Crunchyroll (now licensed by Funimation)

=== Fall ===
- Linebarrels of Iron - Crunchyroll (now licensed by Funimation)

== 2009 ==
=== Winter ===
- Gintama - Crunchyroll
- Kurokami - Crunchyroll, ImaginAsian (Note: This outlet offered an English dub simultaneously with its Japanese subtitled release.)
- The Tower of Druaga ~The Sword of Uruk~ - Crunchyroll (now licensed by Funimation)

=== Spring ===
- Fullmetal Alchemist: Brotherhood - Funimation
- Hayate the Combat Butler!! - Crunchyroll
- Mainichi Kaasan - Crunchyroll
- Naruto Shippuden - Viz Media
- Natsu no Arashi! - Crunchyroll
- One Piece (since episode 415) - Funimation
- Reborn! - Crunchyroll (now licensed by Viz Media)
- Ristorante Paradiso - Crunchyroll
- Saki - Crunchyroll
- Shangri-La - Crunchyroll (now licensed by Funimation)

=== Summer ===
- Charger Girl Ju-den-chan - Crunchyroll
- Kanamemo - Crunchyroll
- Modern Magic Made Simple - Crunchyroll
- Sweet Blue Flowers - Crunchyroll

=== Fall ===
- 11eyes - Crunchyroll
- Asura Cryin' - Crunchyroll
- Fairy Tail - Crunchyroll (now licensed by Funimation)
- Hanasakeru Seishōnen - Crunchyroll
- Heaven's Lost Property - Crunchyroll (now licensed by Funimation)
- InuYasha: The Final Act - Viz Media
- Miracle Train - Crunchyroll
- Mitsudomoe - Crunchyroll
- Natsu no Arashi! Akinai-chū - Crunchyroll
- Nogizaka Haruka no Himitsu: Purezza - Crunchyroll
- Shin Koihime Musō - Crunchyroll
- Tatakau Shisho - Crunchyroll
- Tegami Bachi - Crunchyroll
- Whispered Words - Crunchyroll
- Yumeiro Patissiere - Crunchyroll

== 2010 ==
=== Winter ===
- Chu-Bra!! - Crunchyroll
- Cobra the Animation - Crunchyroll
- Durarara!! - Crunchyroll
- Hanamaru Kindergarten - Crunchyroll
- Omamori Himari - Crunchyroll
- Sound of the Sky - Crunchyroll

=== Spring ===
- Baka and Test - Funimation
- Betrayal Knows My Name - Crunchyroll
- Bleach - Viz Media
- Dance in the Vampire Bund - Funimation
- Demon King Daimao - Crunchyroll, Anime Network
- Giant Killing - Crunchyroll
- Heroman - Crunchyroll
- House of Five Leaves - Funimation
- Lilpri - Crunchyroll
- Rainbow - Funimation
- Shin Koihime Musō: Otome Tairan - Crunchyroll
- The Tatami Galaxy - Funimation

=== Summer ===
- Black Butler II - Funimation
- Cat Planet Cuties - Crunchyroll (now licensed by Funimation)
- Highschool of the Dead - Anime Network
- The Legend of the Legendary Heroes - Funimation
- Maid Sama! - Anime Network
- Nura: Rise of the Yokai Clan - Viz Media
- Occult Academy - Crunchyroll
- Ōkami-san - Funimation
- Sekirei: Pure Engagement - Funimation
- Sengoku Basara II - Funimation
- Shiki - Funimation
- Strike Witches 2 - Crunchyroll (now licensed by Funimation)
- Tono to Issho - Crunchyroll

=== Fall ===
- Fortune Arterial - Crunchyroll
- Heaven's Lost Property: Forte - Crunchyroll (now licensed by Funimation)
- Princess Jellyfish - Funimation
- Oreimo - Anime News Network
- Otome Yōkai Zakuro - Crunchyroll
- Panty & Stocking with Garterbelt - Crunchyroll (now licensed by Funimation)
- Samurai Girls - Anime Network
- Squid Girl - Crunchyroll
- Super Robot Wars OG: the Inspector - Crunchyroll
- Tantei Opera Milky Holmes - Crunchyroll
- Togainu no Chi - Anime News Network
- The World God Only Knows - Crunchyroll

== 2011 ==
=== Winter ===
- Beelzebub - Crunchyroll
- Cardfight!! Vanguard - Crunchyroll
- Dragon Crisis! - Crunchyroll
- Fractale - Funimation
- Freezing - Funimation
- Gosick - Crunchyroll
- Infinite Stratos - Anime Network
- Is This a Zombie? - Crunchyroll (now licensed by Funimation)
- Level E - Crunchyroll (now licensed by Funimation)
- Lilpri Season 2 - Crunchyroll
- Mitsudomoe - Crunchyroll
- Rio: Rainbow Gate! - Crunchyroll
- Wandering Son - Crunchyroll

=== Spring ===
- Aria the Scarlet Ammo - Funimation
- Battle Girls: Time Paradox - Crunchyroll
- Blue Exorcist - Crunchyroll
- Deadman Wonderland - Crunchyroll (now licensed by Funimation)
- [C] - Control - Funimation
- Hanasaku Iroha - Crunchyroll
- Hoshizora e Kakaru Hashi - Crunchyroll
- Lotte no Omocha! - Crunchyroll
- Nichijou - Crunchyroll
- Sekai-ichi Hatsukoi - Crunchyroll
- Sket Dance - Crunchyroll
- Steins;Gate - Crunchyroll (now licensed by Funimation)
- Tono to Issho - Crunchyroll
- Toriko - Funimation
- We Without Wings - Crunchyroll (now licensed by Funimation)
- The World God Only Knows Season 2 - Crunchyroll

=== Summer ===
- A Dark Rabbit Has Seven Lives - Crunchyroll
- Baka and Test - Summon the Beasts Season 2 - Funimation
- Bunny Drop - Crunchyroll
- The Idolmaster - Crunchyroll
- Kamisama Dolls - Crunchyroll
- No. 6 - Crunchyroll
- R-15 - Crunchyroll
- Sacred Seven - Crunchyroll
- The Everyday Tales of a Cat God - Crunchyroll
- The Mystic Archives of Dantalian - Crunchyroll
- YuruYuri - Crunchyroll

=== Fall ===
- C³ - Funimation
- Chihayafuru - Crunchyroll
- Fate/Zero - Crunchyroll
- Future Diary - Funimation
- Guilty Crown - Funimation
- Haganai - Funimation
- Horizon in the Middle of Nowhere - Crunchyroll
- Hunter × Hunter - Crunchyroll
- Kimi to Boku - Crunchyroll
- Last Exile: Fam, the Silver Wing - Funimation
- Majikoi - Crunchyroll
- Maken-ki! - Funimation
- Mashiroiro Symphony - Crunchyroll
- Persona 4: The Animation - Anime Network
- Phi Brain: Puzzle of God - Anime Network
- The New Prince of Tennis - Crunchyroll
- Sekai-ichi Hatsukoi Season 2 - Crunchyroll
- Shakugan no Shana III - Funimation
- Squid Girl Season 2 - Crunchyroll
- Un-Go - Crunchyroll
- Working!! Season 2 - Crunchyroll

== 2012 ==
=== Winter ===
- Amagami SS+ - Anime Network
- Another - Crunchyroll
- Aquarion Evol - Funimation
- Bodacious Space Pirates - Crunchyroll
- Brave 10 - Crunchyroll
- The Familiar of Zero F - Crunchyroll
- High School DxD - Funimation
- Inu x Boku SS - Crunchyroll
- The Knight in the Area - Crunchyroll
- Lagrange: The Flower of Rin-ne - Viz Media & Hulu
- Listen to Me, Girls. I Am Your Father! - Crunchyroll
- Natsume's Book of Friends Season 4 - Crunchyroll
- Nisemonogatari - Crunchyroll
- Poyopoyo Kansatsu Nikki - Crunchyroll
- Recorder and Randsell - Crunchyroll
- Waiting in the Summer - Crunchyroll

=== Spring ===
- Accel World - Viz Media & Hulu
- Dusk Maiden of Amnesia - Crunchyroll
- Eureka Seven: AO - Funimation
- Folktales from Japan - Crunchyroll
- Hiiro no Kakera - Crunchyroll
- Is This a Zombie? of the Dead - Funimation
- Jormungand - Funimation
- Kids on the Slope - Crunchyroll
- Kimi to Boku 2 - Crunchyroll
- Kuroko's Basketball - Crunchyroll
- Lupin the Third: The Woman Called Fujiko Mine - Funimation
- Medaka Box - Crunchyroll
- Mysterious Girlfriend X - Crunchyroll
- Nyarko-san: Another Crawling Chaos - Crunchyroll
- OZMA - Crunchyroll
- Phi Brain: Puzzle of God Season 2 - Crunchyroll, Anime Network & Hulu
- Polar Bear Cafe - Crunchyroll
- Queen's Blade Rebellion - Crunchyroll
- Rock Lee & His Ninja Pals - Crunchyroll
- Saint Seiya Omega - Crunchyroll
- Saki Episode of Side A - Crunchyroll
- Sankarea - Funimation
- Sengoku Collection - Crunchyroll
- Space Brothers - Crunchyroll
- Tsuritama - Crunchyroll
- Upotte!! - Crunchyroll
- Yurumates3Dei - Crunchyroll
- Zetman - Viz Media & Hulu

=== Summer ===
- Aesthetica of a Rogue Hero - Funimation
- The Ambition of Oda Nobuna - Crunchyroll
- Campione! - Crunchyroll
- Chitose Get You!! - Crunchyroll
- Dog Days - Crunchyroll
- Good Luck Girl! - Funimation
- Hakuōki Reimeiroku - Crunchyroll
- Horizon in the Middle of Nowhere Season 2 - Crunchyroll
- Humanity Has Declined - Crunchyroll
- Kingdom - Funimation
- Kokoro Connect - Crunchyroll
- Lagrange: The Flower of Rin-ne - Viz Media & Hulu
- La storia della Arcana Famiglia - Crunchyroll
- Moyasimon Returns - Crunchyroll
- Muv-Luv Alternative: Total Eclipse - Crunchyroll
- Nakaimo - My Sister Is Among Them! - Crunchyroll
- Natsuyuki Rendezvous - Crunchyroll
- PES: Peace Eco Smile - Crunchyroll
- So, I Can't Play H! - Crunchyroll
- Sword Art Online - Crunchyroll
- Tari Tari - Crunchyroll
- Utakoi - Crunchyroll
- YuruYuri♪♪ - Crunchyroll

=== Fall ===
- Aikatsu! - Crunchyroll
- Blast of Tempest - Crunchyroll
- Bottom Biting Bug - Crunchyroll
- Btooom! - Crunchyroll
- Busou Shinki - Anime Network
- Code:Breaker - Funimation
- Ebiten - Crunchyroll
- From the New World - Crunchyroll
- Gintama Season 3 - Crunchyroll
- Girls und Panzer - Crunchyroll
- Hayate the Combat Butler: Can't Take My Eyes Off You - Crunchyroll
- Hidamari Sketch × Honeycomb - Anime Network
- Hiiro no Kakera Season 2 - Crunchyroll
- Ixion Saga DT - Crunchyroll
- Jormungand: Perfect Order - Funimation
- K - Viz Media
- Kamisama Kiss - Funimation
- Love, Chunibyo & Other Delusions - Anime Network
- Lychee Light Club - Crunchyroll
- Magi: The Labyrinth of Magic - Crunchyroll
- Medaka Box: Abnormal - Crunchyroll
- My Little Monster - Crunchyroll
- OniAi - Funimation
- The Pet Girl of Sakurasou - Crunchyroll
- Psycho-Pass - Funimation
- Robotics;Notes - Funimation
- Say "I love you". - Crunchyroll
- Teekyu - Crunchyroll
- To Love Ru Darkness - Anime Network
- Wooser's Hand-to-Mouth Life - Crunchyroll
- World War Blue - Crunchyroll

== 2013 ==
=== Winter ===
- Ai Mai Mi - Crunchyroll
- AKB0048 next stage - Crunchyroll
- Amnesia - Crunchyroll
- Bakumatsu Gijinden Roman - Crunchyroll
- Boku-no-imoutowa"Osaka-okan" - Crunchyroll
- Chihayafuru Season 2 - Crunchyroll
- Cuticle Detective Inaba - Crunchyroll
- Da Capo III - Crunchyroll
- Encouragement of Climb - Crunchyroll
- gdgd Fairies Season 2 - Crunchyroll
- GJ Club - Crunchyroll
- Haganai NEXT - Funimation
- Hakkenden: Eight Dogs of the East - Crunchyroll
- Hetalia: The Beautiful World - Funimation
- Ishida & Asakura - Crunchyroll
- Kotoura-san - Crunchyroll
- Little Busters! (from Episode 14) - Crunchyroll
- Love Live! School Idol Project - Crunchyroll
- Mangirl! - Crunchyroll
- Maoyu - Crunchyroll
- Minami-ke: Tadaima - Funimation
- Oreshura - Crunchyroll
- Problem Children Are Coming from Another World, Aren't They? - Crunchyroll
- PUCHIM@S - Funimation
- Sasami-san@Ganbaranai - Anime Network
- Senyu - Crunchyroll
- Senran Kagura - Funimation
- Student Council's Discretion Level 2 - Crunchyroll
- Straight Title Robot Anime - Crunchyroll
- Tamako Market - Anime Network

=== Spring ===
- A Certain Scientific Railgun S - Funimation
- Aiura - Crunchyroll
- Arata: The Legend - Crunchyroll
- Attack on Titan - Crunchyroll & Funimation
- Date A Live - Funimation
- The Devil Is a Part-Timer! - Funimation
- Devil Survivor 2: The Animation - Crunchyroll
- The Flowers of Evil - Crunchyroll
- Gargantia on the Verdurous Planet - Crunchyroll
- Hayate the Combat Butler: Cuties - Crunchyroll
- HENNEKO – The Hentai Prince and the Stony Cat - Crunchyroll
- Karneval - Funimation
- Leviathan: The Last Defense - Crunchyroll
- Majestic Prince - Crunchyroll
- Muromi-san - Crunchyroll
- Mushibugyo - Crunchyroll
- My Teen Romantic Comedy SNAFU - Crunchyroll
- Nyarko-san: Another Crawling Chaos W - Crunchyroll
- Oreimo Season 2 - Crunchyroll
- Photo Kano - Crunchyroll
- Red Data Girl - Funimation
- Samurai Bride - Crunchyroll
- The Severing Crime Edge - Crunchyroll
- Sparrow's Hotel - Crunchyroll
- Uta no Prince-sama Season 2 - Crunchyroll
- Valvrave the Liberator - Crunchyroll
- Yuyushiki - Crunchyroll

=== Summer ===
- Blood Lad - Viz Media
- Brothers Conflict - Funimation
- Chronicles of the Going Home Club - Crunchyroll
- Danganronpa: The Animation - Funimation
- Day Break Illusion - Crunchyroll
- Dog & Scissors - Crunchyroll
- The Eccentric Family - Crunchyroll
- Fantasista Doll - Crunchyroll
- Fate/kaleid liner Prisma Illya - Crunchyroll
- Free! - Iwatobi Swim Club - Crunchyroll
- Gatchaman Crowds - Crunchyroll
- Genshiken Second Season - Crunchyroll
- Gifu Dodo!! Kanetsugu and Keiji - Crunchyroll
- Hakkenden: Eight Dogs of the East Season 2 - Crunchyroll
- High School DxD New - Funimation
- Hyperdimension Neptunia: The Animation - Funimation
- Kinmoza! - Crunchyroll
- Love Lab - Crunchyroll
- Makai Ouji: Devils and Realist - Crunchyroll
- Monogatari Series Second Season - Crunchyroll & Daisuki
- Recorder to Randoseru Mi♪ - Crunchyroll
- Rozen Maiden: Zurückspulen - Crunchyroll
- Senyu Season 2 - Crunchyroll
- Servant × Service - Crunchyroll
- Silver Spoon - Crunchyroll
- Stella Women’s Academy, High School Division Class C³ - Crunchyroll
- Sunday Without God - Crunchyroll
- Teekyu Season 2 - Crunchyroll
- WataMote - Crunchyroll
- The World God Only Knows: Goddesses - Crunchyroll
- Yamishibai: Japanese Ghost Stories - Crunchyroll

=== Fall ===
- Ace of Diamond - Crunchyroll
- Arpeggio of Blue Steel - Crunchyroll
- Beyond the Boundary - Crunchyroll
- BlazBlue Alter Memory - Funimation
- Bottom Biting Bug Season 2 - Crunchyroll
- Coppelion - Viz Media
- Diabolik Lovers - Crunchyroll
- Freezing Vibration - Funimation
- Galilei Donna - Crunchyroll
- Gingitsune - Crunchyroll
- Golden Time - Crunchyroll
- Gundam Build Fighters - YouTube, Gundam.info
- Hajime No Ippo: The Fighting! - Crunchyroll
- I Couldn't Become a Hero, So I Reluctantly Decided to Get a Job - Crunchyroll
- Infinite Stratos 2 - Crunchyroll
- Kill la Kill - Crunchyroll
- Kuroko's Basketball Season 2 - Crunchyroll
- Kyousougiga - Crunchyroll
- Little Busters! Refrain - Crunchyroll
- Log Horizon - Crunchyroll
- Magi: The Kingdom of Magic - Crunchyroll
- Meganebu! - Crunchyroll
- Miss Monochrome: The Animation - Crunchyroll
- My Mental Choices Are Completely Interfering with My School Romantic Comedy - Crunchyroll
- Nagi-Asu: A Lull in the Sea - Crunchyroll
- Non Non Biyori - Crunchyroll
- Outbreak Company - Crunchyroll
- Phi Brain: Puzzle of God Season 3 - Crunchyroll
- Samurai Flamenco - Crunchyroll
- Strike the Blood - Crunchyroll
- Teekyu Season 3 - Crunchyroll
- Tokyo Ravens - Funimation
- Unbreakable Machine-Doll - Funimation
- Valvrave the Liberator Season 2 - Crunchyroll
- Walkure Romanze - Crunchyroll
- Wanna be the Strongest in the World - Crunchyroll (now licensed by Funimation)
- White Album 2 - Crunchyroll
- Yowamushi Pedal - Crunchyroll

== 2014 ==
=== Winter ===
- Buddy Complex - Funimation & Daisuki
- D-Frag! - Funimation
- Engaged to the Unidentified - Crunchyroll
- Future Card Buddyfight - YouTube & Hulu
- Hamatora: The Animation - Crunchyroll
- Hozuki's Coolheadedness - Crunchyroll
- Inari, Konkon, Koi Iroha - Funimation
- Love, Chunibyo & Other Delusions Ren - Crunchyroll
- Magical Warfare - Crunchyroll
- Maken-Ki! Two - Funimation
- My Neighbor Seki - Crunchyroll
- Nisekoi - Crunchyroll & Daisuki
- Nobunaga the Fool - Crunchyroll
- Nobunagun - Crunchyroll & Funimation
- Noragami - Funimation
- No-Rin - Funimation
- Oneechan ga Kita - Crunchyroll
- The Pilot's Love Song - Crunchyroll
- Pupa - Crunchyroll
- Recently, My Sister Is Unusual - Crunchyroll
- Robot Girls Z - Crunchyroll
- Saki: The Nationals - Crunchyroll
- Sakura Trick - Crunchyroll
- Seitokai Yakuindomo* - Crunchyroll
- Silver Spoon Season 2 - Crunchyroll
- Space☆Dandy - Funimation & Adult Swim
- Soni-Ani SUPER SONICO THE ANIMATION - Crunchyroll
- Strange+ - Crunchyroll
- Wake Up, Girls! - Crunchyroll
- Witch Craft Works - Crunchyroll
- Wizard Barristers - Crunchyroll
- Wonder Momo - Crunchyroll
- Wooser's Hand-to-Mouth Life: Awakening Arc - Crunchyroll
- World Conquest Zvezda Plot - Crunchyroll & Daisuki
- Z/X Ignition - Crunchyroll

=== Spring ===
- Baby Steps - Crunchyroll
- Black Bullet - Crunchyroll
- Blade & Soul - Crunchyroll
- Brynhildr in the Darkness - Crunchyroll
- Captain Earth - Crunchyroll
- Chaika - The Coffin Princess - Crunchyroll
- The Comic Artist and Assistants - Crunchyroll
- Daimidaler the Sound Robot - Funimation
- Dai-Shogun - Great Revolution - Crunchyroll
- Date A Live II - Funimation
- Dragonar Academy - Funimation
- Dragon Collection - Crunchyroll
- Fairy Tail Season 2 - Funimation & Crunchyroll
- The File of Kindaichi Returns - Crunchyroll
- Haikyū!! - Crunchyroll
- Hero Bank - Crunchyroll
- If Her Flag Breaks - Crunchyroll
- Inugami-san to Nekoyama-san - Crunchyroll
- The Irregular at Magic High School - Crunchyroll, Daisuki, Hulu & Aniplex
- Is the Order a Rabbit? - Crunchyroll
- JoJo's Bizarre Adventure: Stardust Crusaders - Crunchyroll
- Kamigami no Asobi - Crunchyroll
- The Kawai Complex Guide to Manors and Hostel Behavior - Crunchyroll
- La Corda d'Oro Blue Sky - Crunchyroll
- Love Live! School Idol Project Season 2 - Crunchyroll
- M3 the dark metal - Daisuki
- Magica Wars - Crunchyroll
- Majin Bone - Crunchyroll
- Mekakucity Actors - Crunchyroll, Daisuki, Hulu & Aniplex
- MUSHI-SHI: The Next Passage - Crunchyroll
- Nanana's Buried Treasure - Crunchyroll
- No Game No Life - Crunchyroll
- One Week Friends - Crunchyroll
- Oreca Battle - Crunchyroll
- Ping Pong: The Animation - Funimation
- PUCHIM@S 2 - Funimation
- Riddle Story of Devil - Funimation
- Rowdy Sumo Wrestler Matsutaro!! - Crunchyroll
- Selector Infected WIXOSS - Funimation
- Soul Eater Not! - Funimation
- The World is Still Beautiful - Crunchyroll

=== Summer ===
- Ai-Mai-Mi Mousou Catastrophe - Crunchyroll
- Akame ga Kill! - Crunchyroll
- Aldnoah.Zero - Crunchyroll, Daisuki, Hulu & Aniplex
- Argevollen - Crunchyroll
- Barakamon - Funimation
- Black Butler: Book of Circus - Funimation & Daisuki
- Bladedance of Elementalers - Crunchyroll
- Blue Spring Ride - Crunchyroll
- Dramatical Murder - Crunchyroll
- Encouragement of Climb Season 2 - Crunchyroll
- Fate/Kaleid Liner Prisma Illya 2wei! - Crunchyroll
- Free! Eternal Summer - Crunchyroll & Funimation
- Glasslip - Crunchyroll
- Hanayamata - Crunchyroll
- Hanamonogatari - Crunchyroll, Daisuki, Hulu & Aniplex
- Invaders of the Rokujyōma!? - Crunchyroll
- Locodol - Crunchyroll
- Love Stage!! - Crunchyroll
- Magimoji Rurumo - Crunchyroll
- Momo Kyun Sword - Crunchyroll
- Nobunaga Concerto - Crunchyroll
- Monthly Girls' Nozaki-kun - Crunchyroll
- Persona 4: The Golden Animation - Crunchyroll, Daisuki, Hulu & Aniplex
- PriPara - Crunchyroll
- Rail Wars! - Crunchyroll
- Re:_Hamatora - Crunchyroll
- Sabagebu! - Crunchyroll
- Sailor Moon Crystal - Viz Media & Crunchyroll
- Samurai Jam -Bakumatsu Rock- - Crunchyroll
- Sengoku Basara: Judge End - Funimation
- Shōnen Hollywood - Funimation
- Space☆Dandy 2 - Funimation & Adult Swim
- Shin Strange + - Crunchyroll
- Sword Art Online II - Crunchyroll & Daisuki
- Terror in Resonance - Funimation
- Tokyo ESP - Funimation
- Tokyo Ghoul - Funimation
- Yamishibai: Japanese Ghost Stories 2 - Crunchyroll

=== Fall ===
- A Good Librarian Like a Good Shepherd - Funimation
- Akatsuki no Yona - Crunchyroll & Funimation
- Bonjour Sweet Love Patisserie - Crunchyroll
- Bottom Biting Bug Season 3 - Crunchyroll
- Case Closed (since episode 754) - Crunchyroll
- Celestial Method - Crunchyroll
- Chaika -The Coffin Princess- AVENGING BATTLE - Crunchyroll
- CROSS ANGE Rondo of Angel and Dragon - Crunchyroll
- DENKI-GAI - Crunchyroll
- Fate/stay night: Unlimited Blade Works - Crunchyroll, Hulu & Aniplex
- The Fruit of Grisaia - Crunchyroll
- Garo: The Animation - Funimation
- Girl Friend Beta - Crunchyroll
- Gonna be the Twin-Tails!! - Funimation
- Gugure! Kokkuri-san - Crunchyroll
- Hi-sCool! Seha Girls - Crunchyroll
- I Can't Understand What My Husband Is Saying - Crunchyroll
- In Search of the Lost Future - Funimation
- Joker - Crunchyroll
- Karen Senki - Crunchyroll
- Laughing Under the Clouds - Funimation (Note: This outlet offered an English dub on a delayed release schedule typically of a few weeks after its Japanese subtitled simulcast.)
- Log Horizon Season 2 - Crunchyroll
- Lord Marksman and Vanadis - Funimation
- MUSHI-SHI The Next Passage Season 2 - Crunchyroll
- Orenchi no Furo Jijō - Crunchyroll
- Parasyte -the maxim- - Crunchyroll
- Psycho-Pass 2 - Funimation
- Rage of Bahamut: Genesis - Funimation
- selector spread WIXOSS - Funimation
- Shirobako - Crunchyroll
- Terra Formars - Crunchyroll
- Tribe Cool Crew - Crunchyroll
- Trinity Seven - Crunchyroll
- When Supernatural Battles Became Commonplace - Crunchyroll
- Wolf Girl and Black Prince - Crunchyroll
- World Trigger - Crunchyroll
- Your Lie in April - Crunchyroll, Hulu & Aniplex
- Yowamushi Pedal Grande Road - Crunchyroll
- Yuki Yuna is a Hero - Crunchyroll

== 2015 ==
=== Winter ===
- Absolute Duo - Funimation
- Aldnoah.Zero Season 2 - Crunchyroll, Hulu, Aniplex & Daisuki
- Assassination Classroom - Funimation
- Cute High Earth Defense Club Love! - Crunchyroll & Funimation
- Death Parade - Funimation
- Dog Days - Crunchyroll
- Durarara!!x2 Shou - Crunchyroll, Hulu, Aniplex, Daisuki
- Fafner Exodus - Crunchyroll
- Gourmet Girl Graffiti - Crunchyroll
- Isuca - Crunchyroll
- JoJo’s Bizarre Adventure: Stardust Crusaders - Battle in Egypt - Crunchyroll
- Kamisama Kiss Season 2 - Funimation
- KanColle - Crunchyroll
- Kuroko's Basketball Season 3 - Daisuki & Crunchyroll
- Maria the Virgin Witch - Funimation
- Military! - Crunchyroll
- Rolling☆Girls - Funimation
- Saekano: How to Raise a Boring Girlfriend - Crunchyroll, Hulu & Aniplex
- Samurai Warriors - Funimation & Crunchyroll
- Shōnen Hollywood -Holly Stage for 50- - Funimation
- The Idolmaster Cinderella Girls - Daisuki
- The Testament of Sister New Devil - Crunchyroll
- Tokyo Ghoul √A - Funimation
- Tsukimonogatari - Daisuki
- Unlimited Fafnir - Crunchyroll
- World Break: Aria of Curse for a Holy Swordsman - Funimation & Crunchyroll
- Yatterman Night - Funimation
- Yurikuma Arashi - Funimation

=== Spring ===
- Ace of Diamond: Second Season - Crunchyroll
- Baby Steps Season 2 - Crunchyroll
- Blood Blockade Battlefront - Funimation & Hulu
- The Disappearance of Nagato Yuki-chan - Funimation & Hulu
- Fate/stay night: Unlimited Blade Works Season 2 - Crunchyroll, Daisuki, Hulu, Aniplex
- Food Wars: Shokugeki no Soma - Crunchyroll
- The Eden of Grisaia - Crunchyroll
- The Labyrinth of Grisaia - Crunchyroll
- Gintama° - Crunchyroll
- Gunslinger Stratos: THE ANIMATION - Crunchyroll, Daisuki, Hulu & Aniplex
- The Heroic Legend of Arslan - Funimation & Hulu
- Hello!! Kinmoza! - Crunchyroll
- High School DxD BorN - Funimation
- I Can't Understand What My Husband is Saying: 2nd Thread - Crunchyroll
- Is It Wrong to Try to Pick Up Girls in a Dungeon? - Crunchyroll
- Joker Season 2 - Crunchyroll
- Mikagura School Suite - Funimation
- My Love Story!! - Crunchyroll
- My Teen Romantic Comedy SNAFU TOO! - Crunchyroll
- Ninja Slayer - Funimation
- Nisekoi: - Crunchyroll, Daisuki, Hulu & Aniplex
- Plastic Memories - Crunchyroll, Daisuki, Hulu & Aniplex
- Punch Line - Crunchyroll
- Rainy Cocoa - Funimation
- Re-Kan! - Crunchyroll
- Rin-ne - Crunchyroll
- Saint Seiya: Soul of Gold - Crunchyroll & Daisuki
- Seraph of the End - Funimation & Hulu
- Show by Rock!! - Funimation
- Sushi and Beyond - Viewster
- Sound! Euphonium - Crunchyroll
- Takamiya Nasuno Desu! - Crunchyroll
- Teekyu Season 4 - Crunchyroll
- Tesagure! Bukatsu-mono Season 3 - Crunchyroll
- Triage X - Crunchyroll
- Ultimate Otaku Teacher - Funimation
- Urawa no Usagi-chan - Crunchyroll
- Uta no☆Prince-sama Revolutions - Crunchyroll
- Wish Upon the Pleiades - Crunchyroll
- Yamada-kun and the Seven Witches - Crunchyroll

=== Summer ===
- Actually, I Am - Crunchyroll
- Aoharu x Machinegun - Crunchyroll
- Aquarion Logos - Funimation, Hulu
- Bikini Warriors - Funimation, Hulu
- Castle Town Dandelion - Funimation, Hulu
- Chaos Dragon - Funimation, Hulu
- Charlotte - Crunchyroll, Hulu, Aniplex, Viewster & Daisuki
- Classroom Crisis - Crunchyroll, Hulu, Aniplex, Viewster & Daisuki
- Danchigai - Crunchyroll
- Durarara!!x2 Ten - Crunchyroll, Hulu, Aniplex, Daisuki
- Fate/Kaleid Liner Prisma Illya 2wei Herz! - Crunchyroll
- Gangsta. - Funimation, Hulu
- Gatchaman Crowds Insight - Crunchyroll
- GATE - Crunchyroll
- God Eater - Daisuki, Hulu
- Hetalia: The World Twinkle - Funimation, Hulu
- Himōto! Umaru-chan - Crunchyroll
- The Idolmaster Cinderella Girls Season 2 - Daisuki, Hulu
- Junjo Romantica 3 - Funimation, Hulu
- Makura no Danshi - Crunchyroll
- Million Doll - Crunchyroll
- Miss Monochrome - The Animation Season 2 - Crunchyroll
- Monster Musume - Crunchyroll
- My Wife is the Student Council President - Crunchyroll
- Non Non Biyori Repeat - Crunchyroll
- Overlord - Funimation, Hulu
- Prison School - Funimation, Hulu
- Rampo Kitan: Game of Laplace - Funimation, Hulu
- Rokka: Braves of the Six Flowers - Crunchyroll
- School-Live! - Crunchyroll
- Seiyu's Life! - Funimation, Hulu
- Shimoneta: A Boring World Where the Concept of Dirty Jokes Doesn’t Exist - Funimation, Hulu
- Sky Wizards Academy - Funimation, Hulu
- Snow White with the Red Hair - Funimation, Hulu
- Symphogear GX - Crunchyroll
- Teekyu Season 5 - Crunchyroll
- To Love Ru Darkness 2nd - Crunchyroll
- Ushio and Tora - Crunchyroll
- Venus Project: Climax - Funimation, Hulu
- Wagnaria!! 3 - Crunchyroll, Hulu, Aniplex, Viewster & Daisuki
- Wakaba＊Girl - Crunchyroll
- Wooser's Hand-to-Mouth Life: Phantasmagoric Arc - Crunchyroll

=== Fall ===
- Ani Tore! EX - Crunchyroll
- Anti-Magic Academy: The 35th Test Platoon - Crunchyroll
- Aria the Scarlet Ammo AA - Funimation
- The Asterisk War - Crunchyroll, Daisuki & Funimation
- Attack on Titan: Junior High - Funimation
- Beautiful Bones: Sakurako's Investigation - Crunchyroll
- Cardfight!! Vanguard G GIRS Crisis - Daisuki
- Chivalry of a Failed Knight - Hulu
- Comet Lucifer - Crunchyroll
- Concrete Revolutio - Daisuki & Funimation
- Dance with Devils - Funimation
- DD Fist of the North Star - Crunchyroll
- Diabolik Lovers More, Blood - Crunchyroll
- Doamayger-D - Funimation
- Fafner Exodus Season 2 - Crunchyroll
- The File of Young Kindaichi Returns Season 2 - Crunchyroll
- Garo: Crimson Moon - Funimation
- Hacka Doll the Animation - Crunchyroll & Daisuki
- Haikyū!! Season 2 - Crunchyroll
- Heavy Object - Funimation
- Hokuto no Ken: Ichigo Aji - Crunchyroll
- Is the Order a Rabbit? Season 2 - Crunchyroll
- K: Return of Kings - Hulu, Neon Alley
- Kagewani - Crunchyroll
- Komori-san Can't Decline - Crunchyroll
- Lance N' Masques - Crunchyroll
- Lovely Muuuuuuuco! - Crunchyroll
- Magical Somera-chan - Crunchyroll
- Miss Monochrome: The Animation Season 3 - Crunchyroll
- Mobile Suit Gundam: Iron-Blooded Orphans - Daisuki, Hulu, Crunchyroll & Funimation
- Noragami Aragoto - Funimation
- One-Punch Man - Daisuki, Viz Media/Hulu
- Onsen Yōsei Hakone-chan - Crunchyroll
- Owarimonogatari - Crunchyroll & Daisuki
- The Perfect Insider - Crunchyroll
- Rainy Cocoa, Welcome to Rainy Color - Funimation
- Riddle Story of Devil - Funimation
- Seraph of the End: Battle in Nagoya - Funimation
- Shomin Sample - Funimation
- STARMYU - Funimation
- Teekyu Season 6 - Crunchyroll
- The Testament of Sister New Devil BURST - Crunchyroll
- Utawarerumono: Itsuwari no Kamen - Crunchyroll
- Valkyrie Drive: Mermaid - Funimation
- Young Black Jack - Crunchyroll

== 2016 ==
=== Winter ===
- Active Raid - Crunchyroll
- Aokana: Four Rhythm Across the Blue - Crunchyroll
- Assassination Classroom Season 2 - Funimation
- BBK/BRNK - Crunchyroll
- Dagashi Kashi - Funimation
- Descending Stories: Showa Genroku Rakugo Shinju - Crunchyroll
- Dimension W - Funimation & Adult Swim
- Divine Gate - Funimation
- Durarara!! x2 Ketsu - Crunchyroll, Funimation, Aniplex, Hulu, Daisuki
- Erased - Crunchyroll & Funimation
- Gate Season 2 - Crunchyroll
- Girls Beyond the Wasteland - Hulu & Anime Network
- Grimgar of Fantasy and Ash - Funimation
- Haruchika - Funimation
- KonoSuba: God's Blessing on This Wonderful World! - Crunchyroll
- Luck & Logic - Funimation
- Mahou Shoujo Nante Mouiidesukara - Crunchyroll
- Myriad Colors Phantom World - Crunchyroll
- Norn9 - Hulu & Anime Network
- Nurse Witch Komugi R - Crunchyroll
- Ojisan and Marshmallow - Crunchyroll
- Ooya-san wa Shishunki! - Crunchyroll
- Pandora in the Crimson Shell: Ghost Urn - Funimation
- Phantasy Star Online 2 The Animation - Crunchyroll
- Please Tell Me! Galko-chan - Crunchyroll
- Prince of Stride: Alternative - Funimation
- Rainbow Days - Funimation
- Schwarzes Marken - Crunchyroll
- Sekkō Boys - Crunchyroll
- Snow White with the Red Hair Season 2 - Funimation
- Tabi Machi Late Show - Crunchyroll
- Teekyu Season 7 - Crunchyroll
- Undefeated Bahamut Chronicle - Hulu
- Yamishibai: Japanese Ghost Stories 3 - Crunchyroll

=== Spring ===
- Ace Attorney - Crunchyroll
- Aikatsu Stars! - Crunchyroll
- And you thought there is never a girl online? - Funimation
- Anne Happy - Crunchyroll
- The Asterisk War Season 2 - Crunchyroll, Funimation, Hulu, Daisuki & Aniplex
- Bakuon!! - Crunchyroll
- Big Order - Crunchyroll
- Brotherhood: Final Fantasy XV - Crunchyroll
- Bungo Stray Dogs - Crunchyroll
- Cerberus - Crunchyroll
- Concrete Revolutio Season 2 - Funimation
- Crane Game Girls - Crunchyroll
- Endride - Funimation
- Flying Witch - Crunchyroll
- Future Card Buddyfight Triple D - Crunchyroll & YouTube
- High School Fleet - Crunchyroll, Funimation & Daisuki
- Haven't You Heard? I'm Sakamoto - Crunchyroll
- Hundred - Crunchyroll
- JoJo's Bizarre Adventure: Diamond Is Unbreakable - Crunchyroll, Hulu & Neon Alley
- Kabaneri of the Iron Fortress - Amazon Prime Video
- Kuma Miko: Girl Meets Bear - Funimation
- Joker Season 3 - Crunchyroll
- Joker Game - Crunchyroll
- Kagewani Season 2 - Crunchyroll
- Kiznaiver - Crunchyroll
- The Lost Village - Crunchyroll
- Mobile Suit Gundam Unicorn RE:0096 - Crunchyroll
- My Hero Academia - Funimation
- Pan de Peace! - Crunchyroll
- Re:Zero − Starting Life in Another World - Crunchyroll
- Rin-ne Season 2 - Crunchyroll
- Sailor Moon Crystal Season 3 - Crunchyroll, Hulu & Neon Alley
- Shōnen Ashibe GO! GO! Goma-chan - Crunchyroll
- Shōnen Maid - Funimation
- Space Patrol Luluco - Crunchyroll
- Super Lovers - Crunchyroll
- Tanaka-kun is Always Listless - Crunchyroll
- Terra Formars Revenge - Crunchyroll, Hulu & Neon Alley
- Tonkatsu DJ Agetarō - Crunchyroll
- Three Leaves, Three Colors - Funimation
- Twin Star Exorcists - Crunchyroll
- Ushio and Tora Season 2 - Crunchyroll

=== Summer ===
- 91 Days - Crunchyroll
- Active Raid Second - Crunchyroll
- Alderamin on the Sky - Crunchyroll
- Amanchu! - Crunchyroll
- Ange Vierge - Crunchyroll
- B-PROJECT - Crunchyroll
- Bananya - Crunchyroll
- Battery the Animation - Amazon Prime Video
- Berserk - Crunchyroll
- Cheer Boys!! - Funimation
- Cute High Earth Defense Club LOVE! LOVE! - Crunchyroll
- D.Gray-man Hallow - Funimation
- Danganronpa 3: Side Despair - Funimation
- Danganronpa 3: Side Future - Funimation
- DAYS - Crunchyroll
- The Disastrous Life of Saiki K. - Funimation
- Fate/kaleid liner Prisma Illya 3rei! - Crunchyroll
- First Love Monster - Funimation
- Food Wars! The Second Plate - Crunchyroll
- Handa-kun - Funimation
- The Heroic Legend of Arslan: Dust Storm Dance - Funimation
- The Highschool Life of a Fudanshi - Crunchyroll
- Hitorinoshita - The Outcast - Crunchyroll
- Hybrid x Heart Magias Academy Ataraxia - Crunchyroll
- Love Live! Sunshine!! - Funimation
- Mob Psycho 100 - Crunchyroll
- Momokuri - Crunchyroll
- The Morose Mononokean - Crunchyroll
- Naria Girls - Crunchyroll
- New Game! - Crunchyroll
- Orange - Crunchyroll
- OZMAFIA!! - Crunchyroll
- Planetarian - Funimation
- Puzzle & Dragons - Funimation
- Qualidea Code - Crunchyroll
- Regalia: The Three Sacred Stars - Funimation
- ReLIFE - Crunchyroll
- Rewrite - Crunchyroll
- Scar-red Rider XechS - Funimation
- Servamp - Funimation
- Show By Rock!! Short!! - Funimation
- Sweetness and Lightning - Crunchyroll
- Taboo Tattoo - Crunchyroll
- Tales of Zestiria the X - Funimation
- This Art Club Has a Problem! - Crunchyroll
- Time Travel Girl - Funimation
- TSUKIUTA. The Animation - Funimation

=== Fall ===
- All Out!! - Crunchyroll & Funimation
- Anime De Training! XX - Crunchyroll
- Aooni The Blue Monster - Crunchyroll
- BBK/BRNK Season 2 - Crunchyroll
- Bloodivores - Crunchyroll
- Brave Witches - Crunchyroll
- Bungo Stray Dogs Season 2 - Crunchyroll
- Cheating Craft - Crunchyroll
- Classicaloid - Crunchyroll & Hulu
- Crane Game Girls Galaxy - Crunchyroll
- Dragon Ball Super - Crunchyroll, Daisuki, Funimation (starting with episode 63), Adult Swim (starting with episode 1 in January 2017)
- Dream Festival! - Crunchyroll
- Drifters - Crunchyroll & Funimation
- Flip Flappers - Crunchyroll & Hulu
- Gakuen Handsome - Crunchyroll
- Girlish Number - Crunchyroll & Hulu
- Haikyū!! Season 3 - Crunchyroll
- HEYBOT! - Crunchyroll
- Izetta: The Last Witch - Crunchyroll & Funimation
- Joker Season 4 - Crunchyroll
- Kaiju Girls - Crunchyroll
- Keijo!!!!!!!! - Crunchyroll & Funimation
- Kiss Him, Not Me - Crunchyroll & Funimation
- Kiitarou Shounen no Youkai Enikki - Crunchyroll
- Long Riders! - Daisuki
- Lostorage incited WIXOSS - Crunchyroll
- Magical Girl Raising Project - Crunchyroll
- Magic-kyun Renaissance - Crunchyroll
- Magic of Stella - Daisuki
- Mahou Shoujo Nante Mouiidesukara Season 2 - Crunchyroll
- March comes in like a lion - Crunchyroll & Daisuki
- Matoi the Sacred Slayer - Hulu
- Miss Bernard said. - Crunchyroll
- Mobile Suit Gundam: Iron-Blooded Orphans Season 2 - Crunchyroll, Daisuki & Hulu
- Monster Hunter Stories: Ride On - Crunchyroll & Funimation
- My Wife is the Student Council President+! - Crunchyroll
- Nanbaka - Crunchyroll & Funimation
- Natsume Yujin-cho Go - Crunchyroll
- Nazotokine - Crunchyroll
- Ninja Girl & Samurai Master - Crunchyroll
- Occultic;Nine - Crunchyroll & Daisuki
- Poco's Udon World - Crunchyroll
- SENGOKUCHOJYUGIGA - Crunchyroll
- Scorching Ping Pong Girls - Crunchyroll
- Show by Rock!! # - Crunchyroll & Funimation
- Soul Buster - Crunchyroll
- Sound! Euphonium 2 - Crunchyroll
- Teekyu Season 8 - Crunchyroll
- Tiger Mask W - Crunchyroll
- Time Bokan 24 - Crunchyroll
- To Be Hero - Crunchyroll
- Trickster - Crunchyroll & Funimation
- Touken Ranbu: Hanamaru - Crunchyroll & Funimation
- Nyanbo! - Crunchyroll
- Utano☆Princesama Legend Star - Crunchyroll & Hulu
- WWW.WAGNARIA!! - Crunchyroll & Daisuki
- Yuri!!! on ICE - Crunchyroll & Funimation

== 2017 ==
=== Winter ===
- ACCA: 13-Territory Inspection Dept. - Crunchyroll & Funimation
- Ai Mai Mi: Surgical Friends - Crunchyroll
- Akiba's Trip: The Animation - Crunchyroll & Funimation
- BanG Dream! - Anime Network & Crunchyroll
- Blue Exorcist: Kyoto Saga - Anime Strike, Crunchyroll & Daisuki
- Chain Chronicle: The Light of Haecceitas - Crunchyroll & Funimation
- Chaos;Child - Crunchyroll & Funimation
- Chiruran 1/2 - Crunchyroll
- Cyborg 009: Call of Justice (TV re-cut) - Netflix
- ēlDLIVE - Crunchyroll
- Fate/Grand Order: First Order - Crunchyroll & Daisuki
- Forest Fairy Five - Crunchyroll
- Fuuka - Crunchyroll & Funimation
- Gabriel Dropout - Crunchyroll
- Gintama Season 4 - Crunchyroll
- Granblue Fantasy - Crunchyroll & Daisuki
- Hand Shakers - Crunchyroll & Funimation
- Idol Incidents - Crunchyroll
- Interviews with Monster Girls - Crunchyroll & Funimation
- Kemono Friends - Crunchyroll
- KonoSuba: God's Blessing on This Wonderful World! 2 - Crunchyroll
- Koro Sensei Quest - Crunchyroll & Funimation
- Masamune-kun's Revenge - Crunchyroll & Funimation
- Marginal♯4 - Crunchyroll
- Minami Kamakura High School Girls Cycling Club - Crunchyroll
- Miss Kobayashi's Dragon Maid - Crunchyroll & Funimation
- Nyanko Days - Crunchyroll
- One Room - Crunchyroll
- Piacevole - Crunchyroll
- Rewrite Season 2 - Crunchyroll
- Schoolgirl Strikers - Crunchyroll
- Scum's Wish - Anime Strike
- Seiren - Crunchyroll
- Descending Stories: Showa Genroku Rakugo Shinju Season 2 - Crunchyroll
- Spiritpact - Crunchyroll
- Super Lovers Season 2 - Crunchyroll
- Saga of Tanya the Evil - Crunchyroll & Funimation
- Tales of Zestiria the X Season 2 - Daisuki & Funimation
- Urara Meirocho - Anime Network & Anime Strike
- Yamishibai: Japanese Ghost Stories 4 - Crunchyroll
- Yowamushi Pedal: New Generation - Crunchyroll

=== Spring ===
- 100% Pascal-sensei - Crunchyroll
- Akashic Records of Bastard Magic Instructor - Crunchyroll & Funimation
- Alice & Zouroku - Crunchyroll & Funimation
- Anonymous Noise - Anime Strike (Note: This series was originally exclusive to Anime Strike, but has since been made available on Hidive after Anime Strike was folded into Amazon Prime Video.)
- Armed Girl's Machiavellism - Anime Strike
- Atom: The Beginning - Anime Strike
- Attack on Titan Season 2 - Adult Swim, Crunchyroll, Funimation and Hulu
- Berserk Season 2 - Crunchyroll
- Bonobono Season 2 - Crunchyroll
- Boruto: Naruto Next Generations - Crunchyroll & Hulu
- Clockwork Planet - Crunchyroll & Funimation
- The Eccentric Family Season 2 - Crunchyroll
- Eromanga Sensei - Anime Strike, Crunchyroll & Daisuki
- Frame Arms Girl - Anime Network
- Future Card Buddyfight X - Crunchyroll & YouTube
- Granblue Fantasy The Animation - Anime Strike, Crunchyroll, Daisuki & Hulu
- Grimoire of Zero - Anime Strike
- Hinako Note - Crunchyroll
- Kabukibu! - Anime Strike
- Kado: The Right Answer - Crunchyroll & Funimation
- Kenka Bancho Otome: Girl Beats Boys - Crunchyroll & Funimation
- The Laughing Salesman - Crunchyroll
- Love Tyrant - Crunchyroll & Funimation
- Monster Strike Season 2 - Crunchyroll
- My Hero Academia Season 2 - Crunchyroll, Hulu & Funimation
- Natsume's Book of Friends Season 6 - Crunchyroll
- PriPri Chi-chan!! - Crunchyroll
- Rage of Bahamut: Virgin Soul - Anime Strike
- Re:Creators - Anime Strike
- Rin-ne Season 3 - Anime Network
- Room Mate - Crunchyroll
- The Royal Tutor - Crunchyroll & Funimation
- Sagrada Reset - Anime Strike
- Sakura Quest - Crunchyroll & Funimation
- Saekano: How to Raise a Boring Girlfriend Flat - Anime Strike
- Seven Mortal Sins - Crunchyroll & Funimation
- The Silver Guardian - Crunchyroll & Funimation
- STARMYU Season 2 - Crunchyroll
- Sword Oratoria: Is It Wrong to Try to Pick Up Girls in a Dungeon? On the Side - Anime Strike
- Tsugumomo - Crunchyroll & Funimation
- Tsuki ga Kirei - Crunchyroll & Funimation
- Twin Angel Break - Crunchyroll
- What do you do at the end of the world? Are you busy? Will you save us? - Crunchyroll & Funimation
- Yu-Gi-Oh! VRAINS - Crunchyroll

=== Summer ===
As of this season, Hidive was established and Anime Network was shut down. Most shows previously available on Anime Network are now available on Hidive.

- 18if - Crunchyroll & Funimation
- Action Heroine Cheer Fruits - Hidive
- Aho Girl - Crunchyroll
- Altair: A Record of Battles - Anime Strike
- Angel's 3Piece! - Crunchyroll
- Battle Girl High School - Hidive
- A Centaur's Life - Crunchyroll & Funimation
- Chronos Ruler - Crunchyroll & Funimation
- Classroom of the Elite - Crunchyroll & Funimation
- Clean Freak! Aoyama kun - Crunchyroll
- Convenience Store Boy Friends - Crunchyroll & Funimation
- Dive!! - Anime Strike
- Elegant Yokai Apartment Life - Crunchyroll
- Fastest Finger First - Crunchyroll
- Gamers! - Crunchyroll & Funimation
- Hell Girl Yoi no Togi - Anime Strike & Crunchyroll
- Hina Logic - From Luck & Logic - Crunchyroll & Funimation
- Hitorijime My Hero - Anime Strike
- Ikemen Sengoku: Bromances Across Time - Crunchyroll
- In Another World With My Smartphone - Crunchyroll & Funimation
- The Irresponsible Galaxy Tylor - Crunchyroll
- Katsugeki! Touken Ranbu - Anime Strike, Crunchyroll & Hulu
- Knight's & Magic - Crunchyroll & Funimation
- Lights of the Clione - Anime Strike
- Love and Lies - Anime Strike
- Made in Abyss - Anime Strike
- Magical Circle Guru Guru - Crunchyroll
- My First Girlfriend is a Gal - Crunchyroll & Funimation
- New Game!! - Crunchyroll & Funimation
- Nora, Princess, and Stray Cat - Crunchyroll
- NTR: Netsuzou Trap - Crunchyroll
- Princess Principal - Anime Strike
- The Reflection - Crunchyroll & Funimation
- Restaurant to Another World - Crunchyroll & Funimation
- Saiyuki Reload Blast - Crunchyroll & Funimation
- Teekyu 9 - Crunchyroll
- Tsurezure Children - Crunchyroll & Funimation
- Vatican Miracle Examiner - Anime Strike
- Welcome to the Ballroom - Anime Strike
- Yamishibai: Japanese Ghost Stories 5 - Crunchyroll

=== Fall ===
- The Ancient Magus' Bride - Crunchyroll & Funimation
- Animegataris - Crunchyroll & Funimation
- Black Clover - Crunchyroll, Funimation, Adult Swim and Hulu
- Blend S - Crunchyroll
- Blood Blockade Battlefront & Beyond - Crunchyroll & Funimation
- Cardfight!! Vanguard G: Z - Crunchyroll
- Classicaloid Season 2 - Hidive
- Code: Realize − Guardian of Rebirth - Crunchyroll & Funimation
- Dies irae - Crunchyroll & Funimation
- Dynamic Chord - Hidive
- Evil or Live - Crunchyroll
- Food Wars! The Third Plate Part 1 - Crunchyroll
- Garo: Vanishing Line - Crunchyroll & Funimation
- Gintama Season 5 - Crunchyroll
- Girls' Last Tour - Anime Strike
- Himouto! Umaru-chan R - Anime Strike
- Hozuki's Coolheadedness Season 2 - Hidive
- The Idolm@ster Cinderella Girls Theater - Crunchyroll
- The Idolm@ster Cinderella Girls Theater (web series) - Crunchyroll
- Idolm@ster Side M - Crunchyroll
- Infini-T Force - Tubi TV & Viz Media
- Inuyashiki Last Hero - Anime Strike
- Juni Taisen: Zodiac War - Crunchyroll & Funimation
- Just Because! - Anime Strike
- King's Game The Animation - Crunchyroll & Funimation
- Kino's Journey -the Beautiful World- the Animated Series - Crunchyroll & Funimation
- Konohana Kitan - Crunchyroll & Funimation
- Land of the Lustrous - Anime Strike
- Love Is Like a Cocktail - Crunchyroll
- Love Live! Sunshine!! Season 2 - Crunchyroll & Funimation
- Love Rice Season 2 - Crunchyroll
- March comes in like a lion Season 2 - Crunchyroll
- Monster Strike: The Fading Cosmos Season 2 - Crunchyroll
- Mr. Osomatsu Season 2 - Crunchyroll
- My Girlfriend is Shobitch - Anime Strike
- Onyankopon - Crunchyroll
- Our love has always been 10 centimeters apart. - Crunchyroll
- Rainy Cocoa Ame-con!! - Crunchyroll
- Recovery of an MMO Junkie - Crunchyroll & Funimation
- Sengoku Night Blood - Crunchyroll
- A Sister's All You Need - Crunchyroll & Funimation
- Taisho Mebiusline Chicchaisan - Crunchyroll
- Time Bokan The Villains Strike Back - Crunchyroll
- Tsukipro the Animation - Crunchyroll
- Two Car - Crunchyroll
- UQ Holder!: Magister Negi Magi! 2 - Anime Strike
- URAHARA - Crunchyroll & Funimation
- Wake Up, Girls! New Chapter - Crunchyroll
- Yuki Yuna is a Hero: Hero Chapter - Anime Strike

== 2018 ==
=== Winter ===
As of this season, Amazon folded its Anime Strike channel into its Amazon Prime Video service. All shows previously noted as exclusive to Anime Strike are now exclusive to Amazon Prime Video except for those noted in Note C.

- After the Rain - Amazon Prime Video
- A.I.C.O. -Incarnation- - Netflix (Note: Netflix released every episode of this series simultaneously worldwide on its premiere date, dubbed in multiple languages including English. Netflix is the exclusive provider of this series in all its served territories, including Japan.)
- B The Beginning - Netflix
- Basilisk: The Ouka Ninja Scrolls - Crunchyroll, Funimation, and Hulu
- Beatless - Amazon Prime Video
- Cardcaptor Sakura: Clear Card - Crunchyroll, Funimation, and Hulu
- Citrus - Crunchyroll & Funimation
- Dagashi Kashi 2 - Crunchyroll & Funimation
- Dame×Prince Anime Caravan - Hidive
- DARLING in the FRANXX - Crunchyroll, Funimation, and Hulu
- Death March to the Parallel World Rhapsody - Crunchyroll & Funimation
- DEVILMAN crybaby - Netflix
- gdgd men's party - Crunchyroll
- Hakata Tonkotsu Ramens - Crunchyroll & Funimation
- Hakumei and Mikochi - Hidive
- Hitorinoshita - The Outcast 2 - Crunchyroll
- Hoshin Engi - Crunchyroll & Funimation
- How to Keep a Mummy - Crunchyroll
- Idolish 7 - Crunchyroll
- Junji Ito Collection - Crunchyroll & Funimation
- Kaiju Girls Season 2 - Crunchyroll
- Katana Maidens: Toji no Miko - Crunchyroll & Funimation
- Killing Bites - Amazon Prime Video
- Kokkoku: Moment by Moment - Amazon Prime Video
- Laid-Back Camp - Crunchyroll
- Märchen Mädchen - Crunchyroll
- Mitchiri Neko - Crunchyroll
- Mitsuboshi Colors - Hidive
- Ms. Koizumi Loves Ramen Noodles - Crunchyroll
- Overlord II - Crunchyroll, Funimation, and Hulu
- A Place Further than the Universe - Crunchyroll
- Pop Team Epic - Hidive, Crunchyroll & Funimation
- Record of Grancrest War - Crunchyroll & Hulu
- The Ryuo's Work Is Never Done! - Crunchyroll
- Sanrio Boys - Crunchyroll
- School Babysitters - Crunchyroll
- The Seven Heavenly Virtues - Hidive
- The Silver Guardian 2 - Crunchyroll & Funimation
- Slow Start - Crunchyroll
- Sword Gai: The Animation - Netflix
- Takunomi - Hidive
- Teasing Master Takagi-san - Crunchyroll & Funimation
- Today's Menu for the Emiya Family - Crunchyroll
- Touken Ranbu: Hanamaru Season 2 - Crunchyroll & Funimation
- Working Buddies! - Crunchyroll
- Yowamushi Pedal: Glory Line - Crunchyroll

=== Spring ===
- Aggretsuko Season 1 - Netflix
- Aikatsu Friends! - Crunchyroll
- Alice or Alice - Hidive
- Amanchu! Advance - Crunchyroll
- Butlers X Battlers - Crunchyroll
- Caligula - Crunchyroll
- Captain Tsubasa - Crunchyroll
- Comic Girls - Crunchyroll
- Crossing Time - Crunchyroll
- Cute High Earth Defense Club HAPPY KISS! - Crunchyroll
- Cutie Honey Universe - Hidive
- Dances with the Dragons - Crunchyroll & Funimation
- Devils' Line - Hidive
- Doreiku - Hidive
- Fist of the Blue Sky Regenesis - Crunchyroll
- Food Wars! The Third Plate Part 2 - Crunchyroll
- Full Metal Panic! Invisible Victory - Crunchyroll & Funimation
- Future Card Buddyfight Ace - Crunchyroll & YouTube
- GeGeGe no Kitarō Season 6 - Crunchyroll
- Golden Kamuy - Crunchyroll & Funimation
- Gundam Build Divers - Crunchyroll
- Gurazeni: Money Pitch - Crunchyroll
- High School DxD Hero - Crunchyroll, Funimation and Hulu
- Hinamatsuri - Crunchyroll & Funimation
- Hozuki's Coolheadedness Season 2, Part 2 - Hidive
- Isekai Izakaya: Japanese Food From Another World - Crunchyroll
- Kakuriyo: Bed and Breakfast for Spirits - Crunchyroll & Funimation
- Last Period: the journey to the end of the despair - Crunchyroll
- Legend of the Galactic Heroes: Die Neue These - Crunchyroll & Funimation
- Libra of Nil Admirari - Crunchyroll
- Lostorage conflated WIXOSS - Crunchyroll
- Love To-LIE-Angle - Crunchyroll
- Lupin the Third: Part 5 - Crunchyroll
- Magical Girl Ore - Crunchyroll
- Magical Girl Site - Amazon Prime Video
- Major 2nd - Crunchyroll
- Megalo Box - Crunchyroll
- My Hero Academia Season 3 - Crunchyroll, Funimation and Hulu
- My Sweet Tyrant - Crunchyroll
- Ninja Girl & Samurai Master Season 3 - Crunchyroll
- Persona 5: The Animation - Crunchyroll & Hulu
- Real Girl - Hidive
- Shōnen Ashibe GO! GO! Goma-chan Season 3 - Crunchyroll
- Space Battleship Tiramisu - Crunchyroll & Funimation
- Star Blazers: Space Battleship Yamato 2202 - Crunchyroll & Funimation
- Steins;Gate 0 - Crunchyroll & Funimation
- Sword Art Online Alternative Gun Gale Online - Crunchyroll & Hulu
- SWORDGAI: The Animation Part I - Netflix
- Tada Never Falls in Love - Hidive
- Tokyo Ghoul:re - Funimation and Hulu
- Uma Musume Pretty Derby - Crunchyroll
- Wotakoi: Love is Hard for Otaku - Amazon Prime Video
- Yotsuiro Biyori - Crunchyroll
- You Don't Know Gunma Yet - Crunchyroll

=== Summer ===
- 100 Sleeping Princes and the Kingdom of Dreams: The Animation - Hidive
- Angels of Death - Crunchyroll, Funimation and Hulu
- Angolmois: Record of Mongol Invasion - Crunchyroll
- Asobi Asobase - Crunchyroll
- Attack on Titan Season 3, Part 1 - Crunchyroll, Adult Swim, Funimation and Hulu
- Banana Fish - Amazon Prime Video
- Calamity of the Zombie Girl - Crunchyroll
- Cells at Work! - Crunchyroll
- Chio's School Road - Crunchyroll, Funimation and Hulu
- Dropkick on My Devil! - Amazon Prime Video
- Encouragement of Climb Season 3 - Crunchyroll
- Free! -Dive to Future- - Crunchyroll & Funimation
- Grand Blue Dreaming - Amazon Prime Video
- Hanebado! - Crunchyroll & Funimation
- Happy Sugar Life - Amazon Prime Video
- Harukana Receive - Crunchyroll & Funimation
- Hi Score Girl - Netflix
- Holmes of Kyoto - Crunchyroll
- How Not to Summon a Demon Lord - Crunchyroll, Funimation and Hulu
- The Idolm@ster Cinderella Girls Theater Season 3 - Crunchyroll
- The Idolm@ster Cinderella Girls Theater Season 3 (web series) - Crunchyroll
- Island - Crunchyroll & Funimation
- The Journey Home - Crunchyroll
- Late Night! The Genius Bakabon - Crunchyroll
- Lord of Vermilion: The Crimson King - Crunchyroll & Funimation
- The Master of Ragnarok & Blesser of Einherjar - Crunchyroll & Funimation
- Meow Meow Japanese History - Crunchyroll
- Monster Strike Season 3 - Crunchyroll
- Mr. Tonegawa: Middle Management Blues - Crunchyroll & Hidive
- Muhyo & Roji's Bureau of Supernatural Investigation - Crunchyroll
- Music Girls - AsianCrush & Crunchyroll
- One Room Season 2 - Crunchyroll
- Overlord III - Crunchyroll & Funimation and Hulu
- Phantom in the Twilight - Crunchyroll
- Planet With - Crunchyroll
- Revue Starlight - Hidive
- Seven Senses of the Reunion - Amazon Prime Video
- Starlight Promises - Crunchyroll
- SWORDGAI: The Animation Part II - Netflix
- The Thousand Musketeers - Hidive
- We Rent Tsukumogami - Crunchyroll
- Working Buddies! Season 2 - Crunchyroll
- Yamishibai: Japanese Ghost Stories 6 - Crunchyroll
- Yuuna and the Haunted Hot Springs - Crunchyroll

=== Fall ===
- Ace Attorney Season 2 - Crunchyroll & Funimation
- Anima Yell! - Crunchyroll
- As Miss Beelzebub Likes - Crunchyroll
- Bakumatsu - Crunchyroll
- Between the Sky and Sea - Crunchyroll
- Black Clover Season 2 - Crunchyroll, Funimation, Adult Swim and Hulu
- Bloom Into You - Hidive
- Boarding School Juliet - Amazon Prime Video
- A Certain Magical Index III - Crunchyroll & Funimation
- Conception - Crunchyroll & Funimation
- DAKAICHI -I'm being harassed by the sexiest man of the year- - Crunchyroll
- Double Decker! Doug & Kirill - Crunchyroll & Funimation
- Fairy Tail Final Season - Crunchyroll & Funimation
- Fist of the Blue Sky Regenesis Part 2 - Crunchyroll
- Gakuen Basara: Samurai High School - Hidive
- The Girl in Twilight - Hidive
- Goblin Slayer - Crunchyroll & Funimation
- Golden Kamuy Season 2 - Crunchyroll & Funimation
- Gurazeni: Money Pitch Season 2 - Crunchyroll
- Hero Mask - Netflix
- HIMOTE HOUSE: A share house of super psychic girls - Crunchyroll
- Hinomaru Sumo - Crunchyroll & Funimation
- The IDOLM@STER SideM Wakeatte Mini! - Crunchyroll
- Iroduku: The World in Colors - Amazon Prime Video
- Jingai-san no Yome - Crunchyroll
- JoJo's Bizarre Adventure: Golden Wind - Crunchyroll
- Karakuri Circus - Amazon Prime Video
- Merc StoriA: The Apathetic Boy and the Girl in a Bottle - Crunchyroll
- Ms. Vampire Who Lives in My Neighborhood - Crunchyroll
- My Sister, My Writer - Crunchyroll
- Radiant - Crunchyroll & Funimation
- Rascal Does Not Dream of Bunny Girl Senpai - Crunchyroll, Funimation & Hulu
- Release the Spyce - Hidive
- RErideD: Derrida, who leaps through time - Crunchyroll & Funimation
- Run with the Wind - Crunchyroll
- Saint Seiya: Saintia Shō - Crunchyroll
- Senran Kagura Shinovi Master - Crunchyroll & Funimation
- Skull-face Bookseller Honda-san - Crunchyroll
- Space Battleship Tiramisu Season 2 - Crunchyroll & Funimation
- SSSS.Gridman - Crunchyroll & Funimation
- Sword Art Online: Alicization - Crunchyroll, Funimation, Adult Swim & Hulu
- That Time I Got Reincarnated as a Slime - Crunchyroll & Funimation
- Tokyo Ghoul:re Part 2 - Funimation and Hulu
- Tsurune - Crunchyroll & Hidive
- Ulysses: Jeanne d'Arc and the Alchemist Knight - Crunchyroll & Funimation
- Uzamaid! - Crunchyroll
- Voice of Fox - Crunchyroll
- Xuan Yuan Sword Luminary - Crunchyroll
- Zombie Land Saga - Crunchyroll & Funimation

== 2019 ==
=== Winter ===
- B-PROJECT: Zecchō Emotion - Crunchyroll
- BanG Dream! Season 2 - Hidive & Crunchyroll
- Bermuda Triangle: Colorful Pastrale - Hidive
- Boogiepop and Others - Crunchyroll & Funimation
- Date A Live III - Crunchyroll & Funimation
- Dimension High School - Hidive & Crunchyroll
- Domestic Girlfriend - Hidive & Crunchyroll
- Dororo - Amazon Prime Video
- Endro~! - Crunchyroll & Funimation
- Girly Air Force - Crunchyroll
- Grimms Notes: The Animation - Crunchyroll
- How Clumsy you are, Miss Ueno - Hidive & Crunchyroll
- Kaguya-sama: Love is War - Crunchyroll, Funimation & Hulu
- Katana Maidens ~ Mini Toji - Crunchyroll
- Kemono Friends 2 - Crunchyroll
- Kemurikusa - Amazon Prime Video
- Magical Girl Spec-Ops Asuka - Crunchyroll & Funimation
- The Magnificent Kotobuki - Hidive & Crunchyroll
- Meiji Tokyo Renka - Crunchyroll
- Mob Psycho 100 II - Crunchyroll & Funimation
- The Morose Mononokean II - Crunchyroll & Funimation
- Mysteria Friends - Crunchyroll
- Pastel Memories - Hidive & Crunchyroll
- The Price of Smiles - Crunchyroll
- The Promised Neverland - Crunchyroll, Funimation, Hulu & Hidive
- The Quintessential Quintuplets - Crunchyroll & Funimation
- Rainy SideG - Crunchyroll
- Real Girl Season 2 - Hidive
- Rinshii!! Ekodachan - Crunchyroll & Funimation
- The Rising of the Shield Hero - Crunchyroll
- My Roommate Is a Cat - Crunchyroll & Funimation
- Star Blazers: Space Battleship Yamato 2202 - Funimation
- Virtual-san Looking - Crunchyroll
- W'z - Hidive & Crunchyroll
- Wataten!: An Angel Flew Down to Me - Crunchyroll

=== Spring ===
- 7 Seeds - Netflix
- Ace of Diamond Act II - Crunchyroll
- Afterlost - Funimation & Hulu
- Aggretsuko Season 2 - Netflix
- AMAZING STRANGER - Crunchyroll
- Ao-chan Can't Study! - Hidive & Crunchyroll
- Attack on Titan Season 3, Part 2 - Crunchyroll, Funimation, Adult Swim & Hulu
- Bakumatsu Crisis - Crunchyroll
- Bungo Stray Dogs Season 3 - Crunchyroll & Funimation
- Cinderella Nine - Crunchyroll
- Demon Slayer: Kimetsu no Yaiba - Crunchyroll, Funimation & Hulu
- Fairy gone - Funimation & Hulu
- Fruits Basket - Crunchyroll & Funimation
- The Helpful Fox Senko-san - Crunchyroll & Funimation
- Hitori Bocchi no Marumaru Seikatsu - Crunchyroll
- The Idolm@ster Cinderella Girls Theater Climax Season - Crunchyroll
- The Idolm@ster Cinderella Girls Theater 3rd Season and Climax Season (web series) - Crunchyroll
- Isekai Quartet - Crunchyroll & Funimation
- Joshi Kausei - Crunchyroll
- King of Prism: Shiny Seven Stars - Crunchyroll
- Kono Oto Tomare! Sounds of Life - Funimation & Hulu
- Midnight Occult Civil Servants - Crunchyroll & Funimation
- Miru Tights - YouTube
- Million Arthur (TV series) Season 2 - Crunchyroll & Funimation
- MIX - Crunchyroll, Funimation & Hulu
- Mobile Suit Gundam the Origin: Advent of the Red Comet - Crunchyroll & Adult Swim
- Namu Amida Bu! -Rendai Utena- - Hidive & Crunchyroll
- Nobunaga Teacher's Young Bride - Crunchyroll
- One-Punch Man Season 2 - Hulu
- RobiHachi - Funimation & Hulu
- Sarazanmai - Crunchyroll & Funimation
- Senryu Girl - Hidive & Crunchyroll
- Shōnen Ashibe GO! GO! Goma-chan Season 4 - Crunchyroll
- Strike Witches: 501st Joint Fighter Wing Take Off! - Crunchyroll & Funimation
- Wacky TV Na na na Season 2 - Crunchyroll
- We Never Learn: BOKUBEN - Crunchyroll, Funimation & Hulu
- Why the Hell are You Here, Teacher!? - Hidive & Crunchyroll
- Wise Man's Grandchild - Crunchyroll, Funimation & Hulu
- Yatogame-chan Kansatsu Nikki - Crunchyroll
- YU-NO: A Girl Who Chants Love at the Bound of this World - Crunchyroll & Funimation

=== Summer ===
- Are You Lost? - Crunchyroll
- Arifureta: From Commonplace to World's Strongest - Funimation & Hulu
- Astra Lost in Space - Funimation & Hulu
- BEM - Funimation & Hulu
- A Certain Scientific Accelerator - Crunchyroll & Funimation
- Cop Craft - Funimation & Hulu
- The Demon Girl Next Door - Hidive
- Demon Lord, Retry! - Funimation & Hulu
- Do You Love Your Mom and Her Two-Hit Multi-Target Attacks? - Crunchyroll & Funimation
- Dr. Stone - Crunchyroll, Funimation & Adult Swim
- Ensemble Stars! - Funimation
- Fire Force - Crunchyroll, Funimation & Adult Swim
- Given - Crunchyroll
- Granbelm - Crunchyroll
- Hakata Mentai! Pirikarako-chan - Crunchyroll
- Hensuki: Are you willing to fall in love with a pervert, as long as she’s a cutie? - Funimation
- How heavy are the dumbbells you lift? - Funimation
- If It's for My Daughter, I'd Even Defeat a Demon Lord - Crunchyroll
- Is It Wrong to Try to Pick Up Girls in a Dungeon? II - Hidive & Crunchyroll
- Isekai Cheat Magician - Crunchyroll
- Kengan Ashura - Netflix
- Kochoki - Funimation & Hulu
- Lord El-Melloi II's Case Files: {Rail Zeppelin} Grace note - Crunchyroll & Funimation
- Magical Sempai - Crunchyroll
- O Maidens in Your Savage Season - Hidive
- The Ones Within - Funimation & Hulu
- Re:Stage! Dream Days♪ - Hidive
- SD Gundam World Sangoku Soketsuden (web series) - Crunchyroll
- STARMYU Season 3 - Crunchyroll
- Symphogear XV - Crunchyroll
- To the Abandoned Sacred Beasts - Crunchyroll
- Try Knights - Crunchyroll
- Vinland Saga - Amazon Prime Video
- Wasteful Days of High School Girls - Hidive
- Yamishibai: Japanese Ghost Stories 7 - Crunchyroll

=== Fall ===
- Actors: Song Connection - Funimation
- African Office Worker - Funimation
- After School Dice Club - Funimation & Hulu
- Ahiru no Sora - Hidive & Crunchyroll
- Ascendance of a Bookworm - Crunchyroll
- Assassin's Pride - Hidive & Crunchyroll
- Azur Lane - Funimation & Hulu
- Babylon - Amazon Prime Video
- Bananya Season 2 - Crunchyroll
- Beastars - Netflix
- Black Clover Season 3 - Crunchyroll, Funimation, Adult Swim and Hulu
- Blade of the Immortal -Immortal- - Amazon Prime Video
- Case File nº221: Kabukicho - Funimation & Hulu
- Cautious Hero: The Hero Is Overpowered but Overly Cautious - Funimation & Hulu
- Chidori RSC (Rifle Is Beautiful) - Hidive
- Chihayafuru Season 3 - Crunchyroll
- Days of Urashimasakatasen - Crunchyroll
- Didn't I Say to Make My Abilities Average in the Next Life?! - Crunchyroll
- Fairy gone Part 2 - Funimation & Hulu
- Fate/Grand Order - Absolute Demonic Front: Babylonia - Funimation
- Food Wars! The Fourth Plate - Crunchyroll
- Granblue Fantasy The Animation Season 2 - Crunchyroll, Funimation & Hidive
- Gundam Build Divers Re:Rise - Crunchyroll
- Hi Score Girl Season 2 - Netflix
- High School Prodigies Have It Easy Even In Another World - Crunchyroll
- Kandagawa Jet Girls - Hidive
- Kemono Michi: Rise Up - Funimation & Hulu
- Kono Oto Tomare! Sounds of Life Part 2 - Funimation & Hulu
- Monster Strike: End of the World - YouTube
- My Hero Academia Season 4 - Crunchyroll, Funimation, Adult Swim and Hulu
- No Guns Life - Funimation & Hulu
- Null & Peta - Crunchyroll
- OBSOLETE - YouTube Premium
- ORESUKI Are you the only one who loves me? - Crunchyroll, Funimation & Hidive
- Outburst Dreamer Boys - Hidive
- Phantasy Star Online 2: Episode Oracle - Funimation & Hulu
- Psycho-Pass 3 - Amazon Prime Video
- Radiant Season 2 - Crunchyroll & Funimation
- Special 7: Special Crime Investigation Unit - Funimation & Hulu
- Stand My Heroes: Piece of Truth - Funimation & Hulu
- Stars Align - Funimation & Hulu
- Sword Art Online Alicization: War of the Underworld - Crunchyroll, Funimation, Hidive & Hulu
- True Cooking Master Boy - Crunchyroll
- Val × Love - Hidive
- We Never Learn: BOKUBEN Season 2 - Crunchyroll, Funimation, Hidive & Hulu
- Welcome to Demon School! Iruma-kun - Crunchyroll
- Z/X Code Reunion - Hidive

== 2020 ==
=== Winter ===
- 22/7 - Funimation
- 7 Seeds Season 2 - Netflix
- A Destructive God Sits Next to Me - Crunchyroll
- A3! - Funimation & Hulu
- ARP Backstage Pass - Crunchyroll
- Asteroid in Love - Crunchyroll & Funimation
- BanG Dream! Season 3 - Hidive
- BOFURI: I Don't Want to Get Hurt, so I'll Max Out My Defense. - Funimation & Hulu
- The Case Files of Jeweler Richard - Crunchyroll
- A Certain Scientific Railgun T - Crunchyroll & Funimation
- Darwin's Game - Funimation
- Dorohedoro - Netflix
- The Daily Life of the Immortal King Season 1 – bilibili
- Future's Folktales - Hidive
- Haikyu!!: To the Top - Crunchyroll
- Hatena Illusion - Funimation
- ID - Invaded - Funimation & Hulu
- If My Favorite Pop Idol Made It to the Budokan, I Would Die - Funimation
- In/Spectre - Crunchyroll
- Infinite Dendrogram - Funimation & Hulu
- Interspecies Reviewers - Funimation (simulcast cancelled after 3 episodes and simuldub cancelled after 1 episode)
- Isekai Quartet 2 - Crunchyroll & Funimation
- The Island of Giant Insects - Crunchyroll
- Keep Your Hands Off Eizouken! - Crunchyroll
- Magia Record: Puella Magi Madoka Magica Side Story - Funimation
- Nekopara - Funimation
- number24 - Funimation
- OBSOLETE - Part II - YouTube Premium
- Oda Cinnamon Nobunaga - Crunchyroll
- Pet - Amazon Prime Video
- Plunderer - Funimation & Hulu
- Re:Zero − Starting Life in Another World Director's Cut - Crunchyroll
- ROOM CAMP - Crunchyroll
- Science Fell in Love, So I Tried to Prove It - Crunchyroll
- Seton Academy: Join the Pack! - Crunchyroll
- Show By Rock!! Mashumairesh!! - Funimation
- Smile Down the Runway - Funimation & Hulu
- Somali and the Forest Spirit - Crunchyroll
- Sorcerous Stabber Orphen - Funimation & Hulu
- Toilet-Bound Hanako-kun - Funimation & Hulu
- Uchitama?! Have you seen my Tama? - Funimation
- Yatogame-chan Kansatsu Nikki 2 - Crunchyroll

=== Spring ===
Due to COVID-19 concerns, several series were postponed or had episodes delayed once they started streaming. Also, the great majority of simuldubs for this season were postponed.

- The 8th Son? Are You Kidding Me? - Crunchyroll
- Appare-Ranman! - Funimation & Hulu (delayed after episode 3)
- Arte - Funimation
- Ascendance of a Bookworm Part 2 - Crunchyroll
- Bungo & Alchemist - Funimation
- Diary of Our Days at the Breakwater - Funimation (delayed after episode 3)
- Digimon Adventure: - Crunchyroll
- Dropkick on My Devil! Dash - Crunchyroll
- Food Wars! The Fifth Plate - Crunchyroll (delayed after episode 2)
- Fruits Basket Season 2 - Crunchyroll & Funimation (same-day simuldub was delayed after episode 3)
- Future's Folktales - Hidive
- Gal & Dino - Funimation (delayed after episode 7)
- Gleipnir - Funimation & Hulu
- Gundam Build Divers Re:Rise 2nd Season - Crunchyroll & YouTube (delayed after episode 18)
- The House Spirit Tatami-chan (ONA) - Crunchyroll
- IDOLiSH7 Second Beat! - Crunchyroll (delayed after episode 4)
- Kaguya-sama: Love is War Season 2 - Funimation
- Kakushigoto: My Dad's Secret Ambition - Funimation
- Kemono Friends: Welcome to the Japari Park Season 2 - Crunchyroll
- Kingdom 3 - Funimation (delayed after episode 4)
- Listeners - Funimation (only the first same-day simuldub episode was streamed on time) & Hulu
- Major 2nd Season 2 - Crunchyroll (delayed after episode 4)
- MASHIN HERO WATARU THE SEVEN SPIRITS OF RYUJINMARU - YouTube (delayed after episode 2)
- The Millionaire Detective Balance: Unlimited - Funimation (postponed after episode 2)
- My Next Life as a Villainess: All Routes Lead to Doom! - Crunchyroll
- Olympia Kyklos - Crunchyroll (delayed after episode 4)
- Princess Connect! Re:Dive - Crunchyroll
- Sakura Wars the Animation - Funimation
- Shachibato! President, It's Time for Battle! - Funimation
- Shadowverse - Crunchyroll
- Shironeko Project: Zero Chronicle - Funimation & Hulu
- Sing "Yesterday" for Me - Crunchyroll
- Tamayomi - Funimation
- Tower of God - Crunchyroll
- Tsugumomo2 - Crunchyroll & Funimation
- Wacky TV Na na na Season 3 - Crunchyroll
- Wave, Listen to Me! - Funimation
- Woodpecker Detective's Office - Crunchyroll

=== Summer ===
- Aggretsuko Season 3 - Netflix
- Cardfight!! Vanguard Gaiden if - Crunchyroll (starting with episode 13)
- Deca-Dence - Funimation & Hulu
- Fire Force Season 2 - Crunchyroll, Funimation & Adult Swim
- Gibiate - Crunchyroll
- The God of High School - Crunchyroll
- Healin' Good Pretty Cure - Crunchyroll (starting with episode 13)
- Lapis Re:Lights - Funimation
- The Misfit of Demon King Academy - Crunchyroll
- Monster Girl Doctor - Crunchyroll
- Mr Love: Queen's Choice - Crunchyroll
- Muhyo & Roji's Bureau of Supernatural Investigation Season 2 - Funimation
- My Teen Romantic Comedy SNAFU Climax - Crunchyroll & Hidive
- Ninja Collection - Crunchyroll
- No Guns Life Part 2 - Funimation & Hulu
- Peter Grill and the Philosopher's Time - Crunchyroll & Hidive
- Re:Zero − Starting Life in Another World Season 2, Part 1 - Crunchyroll
- Rent-A-Girlfriend - Crunchyroll
- Super HxEros - Funimation
- Sword Art Online Alicization: War of the Underworld Part 2 - Crunchyroll, Funimation, Hidive & Hulu
- Umayon - Crunchyroll
- Uzaki-chan Wants to Hang Out! - Funimation

=== Fall ===
- A3! Season Autumn & Winter - Funimation & Hulu
- Adachi and Shimamura - Funimation
- Akudama Drive - Funimation & Hulu
- Animation Kapibara-san - Crunchyroll
- Assault Lily BOUQUET - Funimation
- Attack on Titan Final Season, Part 1 - Crunchyroll, Funimation, Adult Swim & Hulu
- Black Clover Season 4 - Crunchyroll, Funimation and Hulu
- By the Grace of the Gods - Funimation & Hulu
- D4DJ First Mix - Crunchyroll, Funimation, Hidive & YouTube
- The Day I Became a God - Funimation & Hulu
- Dogeza: I Tried Asking While Kowtowing. - Crunchyroll
- Don't Call Us A JUNK GAME! - Crunchyroll
- Dragon Quest: The Adventure of Dai - Crunchyroll & Hulu
- Dropout Idol Fruit Tart - Funimation
- Eagle Talon: Golden Spell - Crunchyroll
- Genie Family 2020 - Crunchyroll
- Golden Kamuy Season 3 - Crunchyroll & Funimation
- Grand Blues! - Crunchyroll
- The Gymnastics Samurai - Funimation
- Haikyu!!: To the Top Part 2 - Crunchyroll
- Heaven Official's Blessing - Funimation
- Higurashi: When They Cry - Gou - Funimation & Hulu
- Hypnosis Mic: Division Rap Battle: Rhyme Anima - Funimation
- I'm Standing on a Million Lives - Crunchyroll
- Ikebukuro West Gate Park - Funimation
- The Irregular at Magic High School Season 2 - Funimation & Hulu
- Is It Wrong to Try to Pick Up Girls in a Dungeon? III - Crunchyroll & Hidive
- Is the Order a Rabbit? BLOOM - Crunchyroll & Hidive
- Iwa-Kakeru! Climbing Girls - Crunchyroll
- Jujutsu Kaisen - Crunchyroll
- King's Raid: Successors of the Will - Funimation
- Kuma Kuma Kuma Bear - Funimation & Hulu
- Love Live! Nijigasaki High School Idol Club - Funimation
- Maesetsu!: Opening Act - Funimation
- Magatsu Wahrheit - Funimation
- Moriarty the Patriot - Funimation
- Mr. Osomatsu Season 3 - Crunchyroll
- Noblesse - Crunchyroll
- Oh, Suddenly Egyptian God - Crunchyroll
- One Room Season 3 - Crunchyroll
- Our Last Crusade or the Rise of a New World - Funimation & Hulu
- Rail Romanesque - Crunchyroll & Funimation
- Sleepy Princess in the Demon Castle - Funimation
- Strike Witches: Road to Berlin - Crunchyroll
- Talentless Nana - Funimation
- TALES OF CRESTROIA -THE WAKE OF SIN- - Crunchyroll & YouTube
- That is the Bottleneck - Crunchyroll & Funimation
- TONIKAWA: Over the Moon for You - Crunchyroll
- Tsukiuta. THE ANIMATION Season 2 - Crunchyroll & Funimation
- Wandering Witch: The Journey of Elaina - Funimation & Hulu
- Warlords of Sigrdrifa - Funimation
- With a Dog AND a Cat, Every Day is Fun - Crunchyroll
- Yashahime: Princess Half-Demon - Crunchyroll, Funimation & Hulu

== 2021 ==
=== Winter ===
- 2.43: Seiin High School Boys Volleyball Team - Funimation
- ABCiee Working Diary - Crunchyroll
- Armor Shop for Ladies & Gentlemen Season 2 - Crunchyroll
- Azur Lane: Slow Ahead! - Crunchyroll
- B: The Beginning Succession - Netflix
- Back Arrow - Funimation
- Beastars Season 2 - Netflix
- Bottom-tier Character Tomozaki - Funimation
- Bungo Stray Dogs Wan! - Crunchyroll
- Cells at Work! Season 2 - Funimation
- Cells at Work! Code Black - Funimation
- Cute Executive Officer - Hidive
- Dr. Ramune Mysterious Disease Specialist - Crunchyroll
- Dr. Stone: Stone Wars - Crunchyroll & Funimation
- Ex-Arm - Crunchyroll
- Gekidol - Funimation
- Heaven's Design Team - Crunchyroll
- The Hidden Dungeon Only I Can Enter - Crunchyroll
- High-Rise Invasion - Netflix
- Horimiya - Funimation & Hulu
- Hortensia Saga - Funimation
- I-Chu Halfway Through the Idol - Crunchyroll
- Idolls! - Crunchyroll
- Idoly Pride - Funimation
- Kemono Jihen - Funimation
- Kiyo in Kyoto: From the Maiko House - Crunchyroll & NHK World-Japan
- Laid-Back Camp Season 2 - Crunchyroll
- LBX Girls - Funimation
- Log Horizon: Destruction of the Round Table - Funimation
- Mushoku Tensei: Jobless Reincarnation - Funimation & Hulu
- Non Non Biyori Nonstop - Hidive & Crunchyroll
- Otherside Picnic - Funimation
- Project Scard: Scar on the Praeter - Funimation
- The Promised Neverland Season 2 - Funimation & Hulu
- The Quintessential Quintuplets Season 2 - Crunchyroll & Funimation
- Re:Zero − Starting Life in Another World Season 2, Part 2 - Crunchyroll
- Redo of Healer - Hidive
- Show by Rock!! Stars!! - Funimation
- SK8 the Infinity - Funimation
- Skate-Leading Stars - Funimation
- So I'm a Spider, So What? - Crunchyroll
- Sorcerous Stabber Orphen: Battle of Kimluck - Funimation
- Suppose a Kid From the Last Dungeon Boonies Moved to a Starter Town - Funimation
- That Time I Got Reincarnated as a Slime Season 2 - Crunchyroll & Funimation
- Tropical-Rouge! Pretty Cure - Crunchyroll
- True Cooking Master Boy Season 2 - Crunchyroll
- Uma Musume Pretty Derby Season 2 - Crunchyroll
- Vlad Love - Crunchyroll
- Wave!! -Lets go Surfing- - Crunchyroll
- WIXOSS Diva Live - Crunchyroll
- Wonder Egg Priority - Funimation
- World Trigger Season 2 - Crunchyroll
- World Witches Take Off! - Crunchyroll
- Yamishibai: Japanese Ghost Stories Season 8 - Crunchyroll
- Yatogame-chan Kansatsu Nikki Season 3 - Crunchyroll

=== Spring ===
- 86 - Crunchyroll
- Bakuten!! - Crunchyroll
- Battle Athletes Victory ReSTART! - Funimation
- Blue Reflection Ray - Funimation
- Burning Kabaddi - Crunchyroll
- Cardfight!! Vanguard overDress - Crunchyroll, Funimation, Hidive & YouTube
- Cestvs: The Roman Fighter - Crunchyroll
- Combatants Will Be Dispatched! - Funimation
- Don't Toy With Me, Miss Nagatoro - Crunchyroll
- Dragon Goes House-Hunting - Funimation
- Edens Zero - Netflix
- Fairy Ranmaru - Crunchyroll
- Farewell, My Dear Cramer - Crunchyroll
- Fruits Basket: The Final - Crunchyroll & Funimation
- Full Dive: This Ultimate Next-Gen Full Dive RPG Is Even Shittier than Real Life! - Funimation
- Gloomy The Naughty Grizzly - Crunchyroll
- Hetalia: World Stars - Funimation
- Higehiro: After Being Rejected, I Shaved and Took In a High School Runaway - Crunchyroll
- How NOT to Summon a Demon Lord Ω - Crunchyroll & Funimation
- I've Been Killing Slimes for 300 Years and Maxed Out My Level - Crunchyroll
- Joran: The Princess of Snow and Blood - Crunchyroll
- Koikimo - Crunchyroll
- Let's Make a Mug Too - Crunchyroll
- Link Click - Funimation
- Mars Red - Funimation
- Megalo Box 2: Nomad - Funimation & Hulu
- Miss Kobayashi's Dragon Maid S Short Animation Series (web series) - Crunchyroll
- Moriarty the Patriot Part 2 - Funimation
- My Hero Academia Season 5 - Crunchyroll, Funimation, Adult Swim & Hulu
- Odd Taxi - Crunchyroll
- Osamake: Romcom Where The Childhood Friend Won't Lose - Crunchyroll
- Pretty Boy Detective Club - Funimation
- Record of Ragnarok - Netflix
- The Saint's Magic Power Is Omnipotent - Funimation
- SD Gundam World Heroes - Crunchyroll, Funimation & YouTube
- Seven Knights Revolution: Hero Successor - Crunchyroll
- Shadows House - Funimation
- Shaman King - Netflix
- SSSS.Dynazenon - Funimation
- Super Cub - Funimation
- The Slime Diaries: That Time I Got Reincarnated as a Slime - Crunchyroll
- Those Snow White Notes - Crunchyroll
- To Your Eternity - Crunchyroll
- Tokyo Revengers - Crunchyroll
- Vivy: Fluorite Eye's Song - Funimation
- The Way of the Househusband - Netflix
- Welcome to Demon School! Iruma-kun Season 2 - Crunchyroll
- The World Ends with You: The Animation - Funimation & Hulu
- Zombie Land Saga Revenge - Crunchyroll & Funimation

=== Summer ===
- Aquatope of White Sand - Crunchyroll
- Battle Game in 5 Seconds - Crunchyroll
- The Case Study of Vanitas - Funimation & Hulu
- D Cide Traumerei - Crunchyroll
- The Detective Is Already Dead - Funimation
- Drugstore in Another World: The Slow Life of a Cheat Pharmacist - Crunchyroll
- The Duke of Death and His Maid - Funimation
- The Dungeon of Black Company - Funimation
- Fena: Pirate Princess - Crunchyroll & Adult Swim
- Fire in His Fingertips Season 2 - Coolmic
- Getter Robo Arc - Hidive
- Girlfriend, Girlfriend - Crunchyroll
- The Great Jahy Will Not Be Defeated! - Crunchyroll
- Higurashi When They Cry Sotsu - Funimation & Hulu
- The Honor Student at Magic High School - Funimation & Hulu
- How a Realist Hero Rebuilt the Kingdom - Funimation & Hulu
- I, Tsushima - YouTube
- I'm Standing on a Million Lives Season 2 - Crunchyroll
- The Idaten Deities Know Only Peace - Crunchyroll
- IDOLiSH7 Third Beat! Part 1 - Crunchyroll
- Kageki Shojo!! - Funimation
- Life Lessons with Uramichi Oniisan - Funimation
- Love Live! Superstar!! - Funimation
- Magia Record: Puella Magi Madoka Magica Side Story Season 2 - Crunchyroll, Funimation & Hidive
- mini vanguard Large - YouTube
- Miss Kobayashi's Dragon Maid S - Crunchyroll & Funimation
- Mother of the Goddess' Dormitory - Hidive
- My Next Life as a Villainess: All Routes Lead to Doom! X - Crunchyroll
- Night Head 2041 - Crunchyroll
- Obey Me! - Funimation
- Peach Boy Riverside - Crunchyroll
- Re-Main - Funimation
- Remake Our Life! - Crunchyroll
- Scarlet Nexus - Funimation
- Seirei Gensouki: Spirit Chronicles - Crunchyroll
- Sonny Boy - Funimation & Hulu
- That Time I Got Reincarnated as a Slime Season 2, Part 2 - Crunchyroll & Funimation
- Theatre of Darkness 9th (Yamishibai: Japanese Ghost Stories 9) - Crunchyroll
- Tsukimichi: Moonlit Fantasy - Crunchyroll
- Tsukipro the Animation 2 - Hidive (delayed to restart on October after episode 8 due to COVID-19)

=== Fall ===
- 86 Part 2 - Crunchyroll
- Aggretsuko Season 4 - Netflix
- AMAIM Warrior at the Borderline - Funimation
- Ancient Girl's Frame - Funimation
- Baki Hanma: Combat Shadow Fighting Saga/Great Prison Battle Saga - Netflix
- BanG Dream! Girls Band Party! ☆ Pico Fever! - YouTube
- Banished from the Hero’s Party, I Decided to Live a Quiet Life in the Countryside - Funimation
- Blue Period - Netflix
- Build Divide -#00000 (Code Black)- - Crunchyroll & Funimation
- Cardfight!! Vanguard overDress Season 2 - Crunchyroll, Funimation, Hidive & YouTube
- The Daily Life of the Immortal King Season 2 - bilibili & Funimation
- Deep Insanity: The Lost Child - Funimation
- Demon Slayer: Kimetsu no Yaiba Entertainment District Arc - Crunchyroll, Funimation & Hulu
- Demon Slayer: Kimetsu no Yaiba Mugen Train Arc - Crunchyroll, Funimation & Hulu
- Digimon Ghost Game - Crunchyroll
- Everything for Demon King Evelogia - Coolmic (uncut) & YouTube (censored)
- The Faraway Paladin - Crunchyroll
- The Fruit of Evolution - Crunchyroll
- Ganbare Dōki-chan - Crunchyroll
- Gundam Breaker Battlogue - YouTube
- The Heike Story - Funimation
- Irina: The Vampire Cosmonaut - Funimation
- JoJo's Bizarre Adventure: Stone Ocean - Netflix
- Kaginado - Crunchyroll, Funimation & Hidive
- Komi Can't Communicate - Netflix
- Let's Make a Mug Too Season 2 - Crunchyroll
- Lupin the 3rd Part 6 - Hidive
- Mieruko-chan - Funimation
- Mushoku Tensei: Jobless Reincarnation Part 2 - Funimation & Hulu
- Muteking the Dancing Hero - Funimation
- Muv-Luv Alternative - Crunchyroll
- My Senpai Is Annoying - Funimation
- The Night Beyond the Tricornered Window - Crunchyroll
- Platinum End - Crunchyroll, Funimation & Hulu
- Pokémon Evolutions - YouTube
- Pop Team Epic Repeat - Crunchyroll, Funimation & Hidive
- PuraOre! Pride of Orange - Funimation
- Ranking of Kings - Crunchyroll & Funimation
- Restaurant to Another World Season 2 - Crunchyroll & Funimation
- Rumble Garanndoll - Funimation
- Sakugan - Crunchyroll
- Selection Project - Funimation
- Shikizakura - Hidive
- ShowTime! - Coolmic (uncut) & YouTube (censored)
- Taisho Otome Fairy Tale - Funimation
- Takt Op - Crunchyroll
- Tawawa on Monday Season 2 - Crunchyroll
- Tesla Note - Funimation
- The Vampire Dies in No Time - Funimation
- Visual Prison - Funimation
- Waccha PriMagi! - Hidive
- World Trigger Season 3 - Crunchyroll
- The World's Finest Assassin Gets Reincarnated in Another World as an Aristocrat - Crunchyroll
- Yashahime: Princess Half-Demon: The Second Act - Crunchyroll, Funimation & Hulu
- Yuki Yuna is a Hero: The Great Mankai Chapter - Hidive

== 2022 ==
=== Winter ===
- Akebi's Sailor Uniform - Crunchyroll & Funimation
- Arifureta: From Commonplace to World's Strongest Season 2 - Funimation & Hulu
- Attack on Titan Final Season, Part 2 - Crunchyroll, Funimation, Adult Swim & Hulu
- The Case Study of Vanitas Part 2 - Crunchyroll, Funimation & Hulu
- CUE! - Crunchyroll
- Delicious Party Pretty Cure - Crunchyroll
- Fantasia Sango - Realm of Legends - Funimation
- Futsal Boys!!!!! - Funimation
- Game World Reincarnation - Coolmic (uncut) & YouTube (censored)
- The Genius Prince's Guide to Raising a Nation Out of Debt - Funimation
- Girls' Frontline - Funimation
- How a Realist Hero Rebuilt the Kingdom Part 2 - Funimation & Hulu
- I'm Kodama Kawashiri - Crunchyroll
- In the Land of Leadale - Crunchyroll
- Life with an Ordinary Guy who Reincarnated into a Total Fantasy Knockout - Crunchyroll
- Love of Kill - Crunchyroll
- Miss Kuroitsu from the Monster Development Department - Crunchyroll
- My Dress-Up Darling - Crunchyroll & Funimation
- Orient - Crunchyroll
- Police in a Pod - Funimation
- Princess Connect! Re:Dive Season 2 - Crunchyroll
- Requiem of the Rose King - Funimation
- Rusted Armors - Crunchyroll
- Sabikui Bisco - Crunchyroll & Funimation
- Saiyuki Reload: Zeroin - Hidive
- Salaryman's Club - Crunchyroll
- Sasaki and Miyano - Funimation
- She Professed Herself Pupil of the Wiseman - Funimation
- Shenmue - Crunchyroll & Adult Swim
- Slow Loop - Funimation
- The Strongest Sage With the Weakest Crest - Crunchyroll
- Tales of Luminaria: The Fateful Crossroad - Crunchyroll & Funimation
- Teasing Master Takagi-san Season 3 - Hidive
- Theatre of Darkness: Yamishibai: 10 - Crunchyroll
- Tokyo 24th Ward - Crunchyroll & Funimation
- Tribe Nine - Funimation
- World's End Harem - Crunchyroll

=== Spring ===
Due to the Sony acquisition, several series that were acquired by Funimation prior to the merger migrated to Crunchyroll.

- 3 Seconds Later, He Turned Into a Beast - Coolmic (uncut) & YouTube (censored)
- Aharen-san wa Hakarenai - Crunchyroll
- AMAIM Warrior at the Borderline Part 2 - Crunchyroll & Funimation
- Aoashi - Crunchyroll
- Ascendance of a Bookworm Season 3 - Crunchyroll
- Bastard!! Heavy Metal, Dark Fantasy Part 1 - Netflix
- Birdie Wing: Golf Girls' Story - Crunchyroll
- Black Rock Shooter: Dawn Fall - Disney+ & Hulu
- Build Divide -#FFFFFF (Code White)- - Crunchyroll & Funimation
- A Couple of Cuckoos - Crunchyroll
- Dance Dance Danseur - Crunchyroll
- Date A Live IV - Crunchyroll
- The Dawn of the Witch - Crunchyroll
- Deaimon - Crunchyroll
- The Demon Girl Next Door Season 2 - Hidive
- Don't Hurt Me, My Healer! - Crunchyroll
- Estab-Life - Crunchyroll
- The Executioner and Her Way of Life - Hidive
- Fanfare of Adolescence - Crunchyroll
- The Greatest Demon Lord Is Reborn as a Typical Nobody - Crunchyroll
- Healer Girl - Crunchyroll
- Heroines Run the Show - Crunchyroll
- I'm Quitting Heroing - Hidive
- In the Heart of Kunoichi Tsubaki - Crunchyroll
- Kaginado Season 2 - Crunchyroll & Hidive
- Kaguya-sama: Love is War: Ultra Romantic - Crunchyroll
- Kingdom 4 - Crunchyroll
- Komi Can't Communicate Season 2 - Netflix
- Kotaro Lives Alone - Netflix
- Legend of the Galactic Heroes: Die Neue These These - Collision - Crunchyroll
- Love After World Domination - Crunchyroll
- Love All Play - Crunchyroll
- Love Live! Nijigasaki High School Idol Club Season 2 - Crunchyroll
- Magia Record: Puella Magi Madoka Magica Side Story Final Season - Crunchyroll & Hidive
- Mahjong Soul Pong - Crunchyroll
- Miss Shachiku and the Little Baby Ghost - Crunchyroll
- Onipan! - Hidive
- The Rising of the Shield Hero Season 2 - Crunchyroll & Hulu
- RPG Real Estate - Crunchyroll
- Science Fell in Love, So I Tried to Prove It Season 2 - Crunchyroll
- Shadowverse Flame - Crunchyroll
- Shikimori's Not Just a Cutie - Crunchyroll
- Shin Ikki Tousen - Crunchyroll
- Skeleton Knight in Another World - Crunchyroll
- Spriggan - Netflix
- Spy × Family - Crunchyroll & Hulu
- Thermae Romae Novae - Netflix
- Tiger & Bunny 2 Part 1 - Netflix
- Tomodachi Game - Crunchyroll
- Trapped in a Dating Sim: The World of Otome Games is Tough for Mobs - Crunchyroll
- Ya Boy Kongming! - Hidive
- Yatogame-chan Kansatsu Nikki Season 4 - Crunchyroll

=== Summer ===
- Black Summoner - Crunchyroll
- Call of the Night - Hidive
- Cardfight!! Vanguard will+Dress - Crunchyroll, Hidive & YouTube
- Caressing My Hibernating Bear - Coolmic (uncut) & YouTube (censored)
- Chimimo - Hidive
- Classroom of the Elite Season 2 - Crunchyroll
- Cyberpunk: Edgerunners - Netflix
- The Devil Is a Part-Timer! Season 2 Part 1 - Crunchyroll & Hulu
- Doomsday With My Dog (web comic) - Hidive
- Dropkick on My Devil! X - Crunchyroll
- Engage Kiss - Crunchyroll
- Extreme Hearts - Crunchyroll
- Fuuto PI - Crunchyroll
- Hanabi-chan Is Often Late - Crunchyroll
- Harem in the Labyrinth of Another World - Crunchyroll
- A Herbivorous Dragon of 5,000 Years Gets Unfairly Villainized - Crunchyroll
- Is It Wrong to Try to Pick Up Girls in a Dungeon? IV Part 1 - Hidive
- Kakegurui Twin - Netflix
- Knights of the Zodiac: Saint Seiya – Battle for Sanctuary - Crunchyroll
- Love Live! Superstar!! Season 2 - Crunchyroll
- Lucifer and the Biscuit Hammer - Crunchyroll & Hulu
- Luminous Witches - Hidive
- Lycoris Recoil - Crunchyroll
- Made in Abyss: The Golden City of the Scorching Sun - Hidive
- The Maid I Hired Recently Is Mysterious - Crunchyroll
- Musasi-no - Crunchyroll
- My Isekai Life - Hidive
- My Stepmom's Daughter Is My Ex - Crunchyroll
- Obey Me! Season 2 - Crunchyroll
- Orient Part 2 - Crunchyroll
- Overlord IV - Crunchyroll
- Parallel World Pharmacy - Crunchyroll
- Phantom of the Idol - Hidive
- Prima Doll - Hidive
- The Prince of Tennis II: U-17 World Cup - Crunchyroll
- Rent-A-Girlfriend Season 2 - Crunchyroll
- Shadows House Season 2 - Crunchyroll
- Shine On! Bakumatsu Bad Boys! - Crunchyroll
- Shine Post - Hidive
- Shoot! Goal to the Future - Crunchyroll
- Smile of the Arsnotoria the Animation - Crunchyroll
- Teppen—!!! - Crunchyroll
- Tokyo Mew Mew New - Hidive
- Uncle from Another World - Netflix
- Urawa no Usagi-chan Musasino! - Crunchyroll
- Utawarerumono: Mask of Truth - Crunchyroll
- Vermeil in Gold - Hidive
- When Will Ayumu Make His Move? - Hidive
- The Yakuza's Guide to Babysitting - Crunchyroll
- Yurei Deco - Crunchyroll

=== Fall ===
- Akiba Maid War - Hidive
- All Saints Street - Crunchyroll
- Arknights: Prelude to Dawn - Crunchyroll
- Beast Tamer - Crunchyroll
- Berserk: The Golden Age Arc - Crunchyroll & Hulu
- Bibliophile Princess - Hidive
- Bleach: Thousand-Year Blood War - Hulu
- Blue Lock - Crunchyroll
- Bocchi the Rock! - Crunchyroll
- Chainsaw Man - Crunchyroll & Hulu
- The Daily Life of the Immortal King Season 3 - Bilibili & Crunchyroll
- Do It Yourself!! - Crunchyroll
- The Eminence in Shadow - Hidive
- Encouragement of Climb: Next Summit - Hidive
- Golden Kamuy Season 4 - Crunchyroll
- Harem Camp! - Coolmic (uncut) & YouTube (censored)
- Housing Complex C - Adult Swim & HBO Max
- The Human Crazy University - Crunchyroll
- I'm the Villainess, So I'm Taming the Final Boss - Crunchyroll
- I've Somehow Gotten Stronger When I Improved My Farm-Related Skills - Hidive
- IDOLiSH7 Third Beat! Part 2 - Crunchyroll
- KanColle: Let's Meet at Sea - Crunchyroll
- Legend of Mana: The Teardrop Crystal - Crunchyroll
- Legend of the Galactic Heroes: Die Neue These - Intrigue - Crunchyroll
- The Little Lies We All Tell - Crunchyroll
- Lookism - Netflix
- Love Flops - Hidive
- Lupin Zero - Hidive
- Management of a Novice Alchemist - Hidive
- Mob Psycho 100 III - Crunchyroll & Hulu
- Mobile Suit Gundam: The Witch from Mercury - Crunchyroll
- More Than a Married Couple, But Not Lovers - Crunchyroll
- Muv-Luv Alternative Season 2 - Crunchyroll
- My Hero Academia Season 6 - Crunchyroll, Adult Swim & Hulu
- My Master Has No Tail - Hidive
- Peter Grill and the Philosopher’s Time: Super Extra - Hidive
- Play It Cool, Guys - Crunchyroll
- Pop Team Epic Season 2 - Crunchyroll
- Raven of the Inner Palace - Crunchyroll
- Reincarnated as a Sword - Hidive
- Romantic Killer - Netflix
- Shinobi no Ittoki - Crunchyroll
- Spy × Family Part 2 - Crunchyroll & Hulu
- To Your Eternity Season 2 - Crunchyroll
- Urusei Yatsura - Hidive
- Uzaki-chan Wants to Hang Out! ω - Crunchyroll
- VazzRock the Animation - Crunchyroll
- Welcome to Demon School! Iruma-kun Season 3 - Crunchyroll
- Yowamushi Pedal Limit Break - Crunchyroll

== 2023 ==
=== Winter ===
- Aggretsuko Season 5 - Netflix
- The Angel Next Door Spoils Me Rotten - Crunchyroll
- Attack on Titan Final Season, Part 3 (1st part) - Crunchyroll, Adult Swim & Hulu
- Ayakashi Triangle - Crunchyroll (delayed to restart on September after episode 8)
- BOFURI: I Don't Want to Get Hurt, so I'll Max Out My Defense. Season 2 - Crunchyroll & Hulu
- Buddy Daddies - Crunchyroll
- Bungo Stray Dogs Season 4 - Crunchyroll
- By the Grace of the Gods Season 2 - Crunchyroll & Hulu
- Campfire Cooking in Another World with My Absurd Skill - Crunchyroll
- Cardfight!! Vanguard will+Dress Season 2 - Crunchyroll, Hidive & YouTube
- Chillin’ in My 30s after Getting Fired from the Demon King’s Army - Crunchyroll
- D4DJ All Mix - Crunchyroll & YouTube
- Don't Toy With Me, Miss Nagatoro 2nd Attack - Crunchyroll
- Endo and Kobayashi Live! The Latest on Tsundere Villainess Lieselotte - Hidive
- Farming Life in Another World - Hidive
- The Fire Hunter - Crunchyroll
- The Fruit of Evolution Season 2 - Crunchyroll
- Giant Beasts of Ars - Hidive
- Handyman Saitō in Another World - Crunchyroll
- High Card - Crunchyroll
- The Ice Guy and His Cool Female Colleague - Crunchyroll
- The Iceblade Sorcerer Shall Rule the World - Crunchyroll
- In/Spectre Season 2 - Crunchyroll
- Ippon Again! - Hidive
- Is It Wrong to Try to Pick Up Girls in a Dungeon? IV Part 2 - Hidive
- Kaina of the Great Snow Sea - Crunchyroll
- Kubo Won't Let Me Be Invisible - Hidive (delayed after episode 6)
- The Legend of Heroes: Trails of Cold Steel – Northern War - Crunchyroll
- The Magical Revolution of the Reincarnated Princess and the Genius Young Lady - Crunchyroll
- Malevolent Spirits - Crunchyroll
- The Misfit of Demon King Academy Season 2, Part 1 - Crunchyroll (delayed to restart on mid-August after episode 6)
- My Life as Inukai-san's Dog - Hidive
- Nier: Automata Ver1.1a - Crunchyroll (delayed after episode 8)
- Nijiyon Animation - Crunchyroll & YouTube
- Ningen Fushin: Adventurers Who Don't Believe in Humanity Will Save the World - Crunchyroll
- Oh, Suddenly Egyptian God Season 2 - Crunchyroll
- Onimai: I'm Now Your Sister! - Crunchyroll
- Reborn to Master the Blade: From Hero-King to Extraordinary Squire - Crunchyroll
- Record of Ragnarok Season 2 - Netflix
- The Reincarnation of the Strongest Exorcist in Another World - Crunchyroll
- Revenger - Crunchyroll
- Saving 80,000 Gold in Another World for My Retirement - Crunchyroll
- Slow Time! 2 - Coolmic (uncut) & YouTube (censored)
- Soaring Sky! Pretty Cure - Crunchyroll
- Sorcerous Stabber Orphen: Chaos in Urbanrama - Crunchyroll
- Spy Classroom - Hidive
- Sugar Apple Fairy Tale - Crunchyroll
- The Tale of the Outcasts - Crunchyroll
- Technoroid Overmind- Crunchyroll
- Tokyo Revengers: Christmas Showdown - Disney+, Star+ & Hulu
- Tomo-chan Is a Girl! - Crunchyroll
- Trigun Stampede - Crunchyroll & Hulu
- Tsurune Season 2 - Hidive
- UniteUp! - Crunchyroll
- The Vampire Dies in No Time Season 2 - Crunchyroll
- Vinland Saga Season 2 - Crunchyroll & Netflix
- The Way of the Househusband Season 2 - Netflix

=== Spring ===
- A Galaxy Next Door - Crunchyroll
- Alice Gear Aegis Expansion - Hidive
- The Ancient Magus' Bride Season 2, Part 1- Crunchyroll
- Birdie Wing: Golf Girls' Story Season 2 - Crunchyroll
- The Café Terrace and Its Goddesses - Crunchyroll
- Chronicles of an Aristocrat Reborn in Another World - Crunchyroll
- The Dangers in My Heart - Hidive
- Dead Mount Death Play Part 1 - Crunchyroll
- Demon Slayer: Kimetsu no Yaiba – Swordsmith Village Arc - Crunchyroll & Hulu
- Dr. Stone: New World Part 1 - Crunchyroll & Adult Swim
- Edens Zero Season 2 - Crunchyroll, Animation Digital Network, Jonu Media & Anime Onegai
- Heavenly Delusion - Disney+, Star+ & Hulu
- Hell's Paradise: Jigokuraku - Crunchyroll
- I Got a Cheat Skill in Another World and Became Unrivaled in the Real World, Too - Crunchyroll
- The Idolmaster Cinderella Girls U149 - Crunchyroll
- In Another World With My Smartphone Season 2 - Crunchyroll
- Insomniacs After School - Hidive
- KamiKatsu: Working for God in a Godless World - Crunchyroll
- Kizuna no Allele - Crunchyroll
- KonoSuba: An Explosion on This Wonderful World! - Crunchyroll
- Kubo Won't Let Me Be Invisible - Hidive (starting with episode 7)
- Kuma Kuma Kuma Bear Punch! - Crunchyroll & Hulu
- The Legendary Hero Is Dead! - Crunchyroll
- Magical Destroyers - Crunchyroll
- The Marginal Service - Crunchyroll
- Mashle: Magic and Muscles - Crunchyroll
- MIX Season 2 - Crunchyroll & Hulu
- Mobile Suit Gundam: The Witch from Mercury Part 2 - Crunchyroll
- My Clueless First Friend - Crunchyroll
- My Home Hero - Crunchyroll
- My Love Story with Yamada-kun at Lv999 - Crunchyroll
- My One-Hit Kill Sister - Crunchyroll
- Offering My Virginity to a Gangster - Coolmic (uncut) & YouTube (censored)
- Opus.COLORs - Crunchyroll
- Oshi no Ko - Crunchyroll & Hidive
- Otaku Elf - Hidive
- Ranking of Kings: Treasure Chest of Courage - Crunchyroll
- Rokudo's Bad Girls - Crunchyroll
- Sacrificial Princess and the King of Beasts - Crunchyroll
- Skip and Loafer - Crunchyroll
- Sorcerous Stabber Orphen: Doom of Dragon’s Sanctuary - Crunchyroll
- Summoned to Another World... Again? - Crunchyroll
- Tokyo Mew Mew New Season 2 - Hidive
- TONIKAWA: Over the Moon for You Season 2 - Crunchyroll
- Too Cute Crisis - Hidive
- Why Raeliana Ended Up at the Duke's Mansion - Crunchyroll
- World Dai Star - Crunchyroll
- Yuri Is My Job! - Crunchyroll
- XY - Bilibili & Crunchyroll

=== Summer ===
- Am I Actually the Strongest? - Crunchyroll
- Atelier Ryza: Ever Darkness & the Secret Hideout - Crunchyroll
- Ayaka: A Story of Bonds and Wounds - Crunchyroll
- Baki Hanma: Tale of Pickle Saga/Pickle Wars Saga - Netflix
- BanG Dream! It's MyGO!!!!! - Crunchyroll
- Bleach: Thousand-Year Blood War Part 2 - Disney+, Star+ & Hulu
- Bungo Stray Dogs Season 5 - Crunchyroll
- Cardfight!! Vanguard will+Dress Season 3 - Crunchyroll, Hidive & YouTube
- Classroom for Heroes - Crunchyroll
- Dark Gathering - Hidive
- The Devil Is a Part-Timer! Season 2, Part 2 - Crunchyroll & Hulu
- The Dreaming Boy Is a Realist - Hidive
- The Duke of Death and His Maid Season 2 - Crunchyroll
- The Gene of AI - Crunchyroll
- The Girl I Like Forgot Her Glasses - Crunchyroll
- The Great Cleric - Crunchyroll
- Helck - Hidive
- Horimiya: The Missing Pieces - Crunchyroll & Hulu
- Hyakushō Kizoku - Anime Onegai and Animation Digital Network
- Jujutsu Kaisen Season 2 - Crunchyroll
- Kengan Ashura Season 2, Part 1 - Netflix
- Level 1 Demon Lord and One Room Hero - Hidive
- Liar Liar - Crunchyroll
- Link Click Season 2 - Bilibili & Crunchyroll
- Malevolent Spirits Season 2 - Crunchyroll
- Married Couple Swap - Coolmic (uncut) & YouTube (censored)
- Masamune-kun's Revenge R - Crunchyroll
- The Masterful Cat Is Depressed Again Today - Crunchyroll
- The Most Heretical Last Boss Queen - Hidive
- Mushoku Tensei: Jobless Reincarnation Season 2, Part 1 - Crunchyroll & Hulu
- My Happy Marriage - Netflix
- My Tiny Senpai - Crunchyroll
- My Unique Skill Makes Me OP Even at Level 1 - Crunchyroll
- Ōoku: The Inner Chambers - Netflix
- Reborn as a Vending Machine, I Now Wander the Dungeon - Crunchyroll
- Rent-A-Girlfriend Season 3 - Crunchyroll
- Reign of the Seven Spellblades - Crunchyroll
- Rurouni Kenshin - Crunchyroll
- Saint Cecilia and Pastor Lawrence - Crunchyroll
- Shadowverse Flame: Seven Shadows Arc - Crunchyroll
- Spy Classroom Season 2 - Hidive
- Sugar Apple Fairy Tale Part 2 - Crunchyroll
- Sweet Reincarnation - Crunchyroll
- Synduality: Noir - Disney+, Star+ & Hulu
- TenPuru: No One Can Live on Loneliness - Crunchyroll
- Theatre of Darkness: Yamishibai: 11 - Crunchyroll
- Undead Girl Murder Farce - Crunchyroll
- Yohane the Parhelion: Sunshine in the Mirror - Crunchyroll
- Zom 100: Bucket List of the Dead - Crunchyroll, Hulu & Netflix

=== Fall ===
- The 100 Girlfriends Who Really, Really, Really, Really, Really Love You - Crunchyroll
- 16bit Sensation: Another Layer - Crunchyroll
- A Girl & Her Guard Dog - Crunchyroll
- A Playthrough of a Certain Dude's VRMMO Life - Crunchyroll
- A Returner's Magic Should Be Special - Crunchyroll
- After-School Hanako-kun - Crunchyroll
- Akuma-kun - Netflix
- The Ancient Magus' Bride Season 2, Part 2 - Crunchyroll
- The Apothecary Diaries - Crunchyroll
- Arknights: Perish in Frost - Crunchyroll
- Attack on Titan Final Season, Part 3 (2nd part) - Crunchyroll, Adult Swim & Hulu
- B-Project Passion*Love Call - Crunchyroll, Anime Onegai & Amazon Prime Video
- Berserk of Gluttony - Crunchyroll
- Bullbuster - Crunchyroll
- Butareba: The Story of a Man Turned into a Pig - Crunchyroll
- Captain Tsubasa: Junior Youth - Crunchyroll, Amazon Prime Video & Pluto TV
- The Daily Life of the Immortal King Season 4 - Bilibili & Crunchyroll
- Dead Mount Death Play Part 2 - Crunchyroll
- The Demon Sword Master of Excalibur Academy - Hidive
- Dr. Stone: New World Part 2 - Crunchyroll & Adult Swim
- The Eminence in Shadow Season 2 - Hidive
- The Family Circumstances of the Irregular Witch - Crunchyroll
- The Faraway Paladin: The Lord of Rust Mountain - Crunchyroll
- Firefighter Daigo: Rescuer in Orange - Crunchyroll
- Four Knights of the Apocalypse - Netflix
- Frieren: Beyond Journey’s End - Crunchyroll
- Girlfriend, Girlfriend Season 2 - Crunchyroll
- Goblin Slayer Season 2 - Crunchyroll
- Good Night World - Netflix
- Heaven Official's Blessing Season 2 - Bilibili & Crunchyroll
- Hypnosis Mic: Division Rap Battle: Rhyme Anima+ - Crunchyroll
- I Shall Survive Using Potions! - Crunchyroll
- I'm Giving the Disgraced Noble Lady I Rescued a Crash Course in Naughtiness - Crunchyroll
- I'm in Love with the Villainess - Crunchyroll
- The Idolmaster Million Live! - Crunchyroll
- KamiErabi God.app - Crunchyroll
- Kawagoe Boys Sing - Crunchyroll
- The Kingdoms of Ruin - Crunchyroll
- Kizuna no Allele Season 2 - Crunchyroll
- Let Me Check the Walkthrough First - Crunchyroll
- Migi&Dali - Crunchyroll
- MF Ghost - Crunchyroll
- My Daughter Left the Nest and Returned an S-Rank Adventurer - Crunchyroll
- My New Boss Is Goofy - Crunchyroll
- Our Dating Story: The Experienced You and The Inexperienced Me - Crunchyroll
- Overtake! - Crunchyroll
- Paradox Live: The Animation - Crunchyroll
- Power of Hope: PreCure Full Bloom - Crunchyroll
- Pluto - Netflix
- Protocol: Rain - Crunchyroll
- Ragna Crimson - Hidive
- The Rising of the Shield Hero Season 3 - Crunchyroll & Hulu
- Ron Kamonohashi - Crunchyroll
- The Saint's Magic Power Is Omnipotent Season 2 - Crunchyroll
- Scott Pilgrim Takes Off - Netflix
- Secret Mission - Undercover Agents Never Back Down! - Coolmic (uncut) & YouTube (censored)
- Shangri-La Frontier - Crunchyroll
- SHY - Crunchyroll
- Spy × Family Season 2 - Crunchyroll & Hulu
- Stardust Telepath - Crunchyroll
- Tearmoon Empire - Crunchyroll
- Tokyo Revengers: Tenjiku Arc - Disney+, Star+ & Hulu
- Uma Musume Pretty Derby Season 3 - Crunchyroll
- Undead Unluck - Disney+, Star+ & Hulu
- Under Ninja - Crunchyroll
- The Vexations of a Shut-In Vampire Princess - Hidive
- The Yuzuki Family's Four Sons - Crunchyroll

== 2024 ==
=== Winter ===
- 7th Time Loop: The Villainess Enjoys a Carefree Life Married to Her Worst Enemy! - Crunchyroll
- A Sign of Affection - Crunchyroll
- Adam's Sweet Agony - Coolmic (uncut) & YouTube (censored)
- Bang Brave Bang Bravern - Crunchyroll
- Banished from the Hero’s Party, I Decided to Live a Quiet Life in the Countryside Season 2 - Crunchyroll
- Bottom-tier Character Tomozaki 2nd Stage - Crunchyroll
- Blue Exorcist: Shimane Illuminati Saga - Crunchyroll
- Bucchigiri?! - Crunchyroll
- CARDFIGHT!! VANGUARD Divinez - Crunchyroll & YouTube
- Chained Soldier - Hidive
- Cherry Magic! Thirty Years of Virginity Can Make You a Wizard?! - Crunchyroll
- Classroom of the Elite Season 3 - Crunchyroll
- Chibi Maruko-chan - Crunchyroll
- The Dangers in My Heart Season 2 - Hidive
- Delicious in Dungeon - Netflix
- Delusional Monthly Magazine - Crunchyroll
- The Demon Prince of Momochi House - Crunchyroll
- Doctor Elise - Crunchyroll
- The Fire Hunter Season 2 - Crunchyroll
- Fluffy Paradise - Crunchyroll
- The Foolish Angel Dances with the Devil - Crunchyroll
- Great Pretender: Razbliuto - Crunchyroll
- Gushing over Magical Girls - Hidive
- High Card Season 2 - Crunchyroll
- Hokkaido Gals Are Super Adorable! - Crunchyroll
- Isekai Onsen Paradise - Coolmic (uncut) & Anime Onegai
- Ishura - Disney+, Star+ & Hulu
- Kingdom 5 - Crunchyroll
- Mashle: Magic and Muscles Season 2 - Crunchyroll
- Meiji Gekken: 1874 - Crunchyroll
- Metallic Rouge - Crunchyroll
- Mr. Villain's Day Off - Crunchyroll
- My Instant Death Ability Is So Overpowered - Hidive
- Ninja Kamui - Adult Swim & Max
- Pon no Michi - YouTube and Animation Digital Network
- Sasaki and Peeps - Crunchyroll
- Sengoku Youko - Crunchyroll
- Shaman King: Flowers - Netflix, Anime Onegai and Animation Digital Network
- Snack Basue - Crunchyroll
- Solo Leveling - Crunchyroll
- The Strongest Tank's Labyrinth Raids - Crunchyroll
- Synduality: Noir Part 2 - Disney+, Star+ & Hulu
- Tales of Wedding Rings - Crunchyroll
- Theatre of Darkness: Yamishibai: 12 - Crunchyroll
- 'Tis Time for "Torture," Princess - Crunchyroll
- Tsukimichi: Moonlit Fantasy Season 2 - Crunchyroll
- The Unwanted Undead Adventurer - Crunchyroll
- Urusei Yatsura Season 2 - Hidive
- Villainess Level 99: I May Be the Hidden Boss but I'm Not the Demon Lord - Crunchyroll
- The Weakest Tamer Began a Journey to Pick Up Trash - Crunchyroll
- The Witch and the Beast - Crunchyroll
- Wonderful PreCure! - Crunchyroll
- The Wrong Way to Use Healing Magic - Crunchyroll

=== Spring ===
- A Condition Called Love - Crunchyroll
- A Salad Bowl of Eccentrics - Crunchyroll
- An Archdemon's Dilemma: How to Love Your Elf Bride - Crunchyroll
- As a Reincarnated Aristocrat, I'll Use My Appraisal Skill to Rise in the World - Crunchyroll
- Astro Note - Crunchyroll
- The Banished Former Hero Lives as He Pleases - Crunchyroll
- Bartender: Glass of God - Crunchyroll
- Black Butler: Public School Arc - Crunchyroll
- Blue Archive: the Animation - YouTube
- Chillin' in Another World with Level 2 Super Cheat Powers - Crunchyroll
- Date A Live V - Crunchyroll
- Dead Dead Demon's Dededede Destruction - Crunchyroll
- Demon Slayer: Kimetsu no Yaiba – Hashira Training Arc - Crunchyroll, Disney+ & Hulu
- Dragon Raja: The Blazing Dawn - Crunchyroll
- The Duke of Death and His Maid Season 3 - Crunchyroll
- The Fable - Disney+, Star+ & Hulu
- Girls Band Cry - Animation Digital Network & Crunchyroll
- Go! Go! Loser Ranger! - Disney+, Star+ & Hulu
- Gods' Games We Play - Crunchyroll
- Grandpa and Grandma Turn Young Again - Crunchyroll
- Highspeed Etoile - Crunchyroll
- I Was Reincarnated as the 7th Prince so I Can Take My Time Perfecting My Magical Ability - Crunchyroll
- The Idolmaster Shiny Colors - Crunchyroll
- The Irregular at Magic High School Season 3 - Crunchyroll, Disney+ & Hulu
- Jellyfish Can't Swim in the Night - Hidive
- Kaiju No. 8 - Crunchyroll & Twitter
- Knights of the Zodiac: Saint Seiya – Battle for Sanctuary Part 2 - Crunchyroll
- KonoSuba: God's Blessing on This Wonderful World! 3 - Crunchyroll
- Laid-Back Camp Season 3 - Crunchyroll
- The Many Sides of Voice Actor Radio - Crunchyroll
- The Misfit of Demon King Academy Season 2, Part 2 - Crunchyroll
- Mission: Yozakura Family - Disney+, Star+ & Hulu
- Mushoku Tensei: Jobless Reincarnation Season 2, Part 2 - Crunchyroll, Disney+ & Hulu
- My Hero Academia Season 7 - Crunchyroll, Disney+ & Hulu
- Mysterious Disappearances - Crunchyroll
- The New Gate - Crunchyroll
- Nijiyon Animation Season 2 - Crunchyroll & YouTube
- Oblivion Battery - Crunchyroll
- The Perfect Prince Loves Me, the Side Character?! - Coolmic (uncut), Anime Onegai & YouTube (censored)
- Re:Monster - Crunchyroll
- Rising Impact - Netflix
- Sand Land: The Series - Disney+, Star+ & Hulu
- Shadowverse Flame: Arc-hen - Crunchyroll
- Sound! Euphonium 3 - Crunchyroll
- Spice and Wolf: Merchant Meets the Wise Wolf - Crunchyroll
- Studio Apartment, Good Lighting, Angel Included - Crunchyroll
- Tadaima, Okaeri - Crunchyroll
- That Time I Got Reincarnated as a Slime Season 3 - Crunchyroll
- Tonari no Yōkai-san - Crunchyroll
- Tonbo! - Amazon Prime Video, Anime Onegai, Animation Digital Network, Tubi & YouTube
- Train to the End of the World - Crunchyroll
- Unnamed Memory - Crunchyroll
- Vampire Dormitory - Crunchyroll
- Viral Hit - Crunchyroll
- Whisper Me a Love Song - Hidive
- Wind Breaker - Crunchyroll
- Yatagarasu: The Raven Does Not Choose Its Master - Crunchyroll

=== Summer ===
Starting this season, Disney+ merged with Star+ in Latin America, while Hulu remained in the United States, as standalone service with their proper app and their own hub inside Disney+.

- 2.5 Dimensional Seduction - Hidive
- A Journey Through Another World: Raising Kids While Adventuring - Crunchyroll
- A Nobody's Way Up to an Exploration Hero - Crunchyroll
- Alya Sometimes Hides Her Feelings in Russian - Crunchyroll
- ATRI -My Dear Moments- - Crunchyroll
- Bye Bye, Earth - Crunchyroll
- The Café Terrace and Its Goddesses Season 2 - Crunchyroll
- CARDFIGHT!! VANGUARD Divinez Season 2 - Crunchyroll & YouTube
- Chi's Sweet Summer Vacation - Netflix
- Code Geass: Rozé of the Recapture - Disney+ & Hulu
- Days with My Stepsister - Crunchyroll
- Delico's Nursery - Crunchyroll
- Dahlia in Bloom: Crafting a Fresh Start with Magical Tools - Crunchyroll
- Dungeon People - Hidive
- Egumi Legacy - Ani-One
- The Elusive Samurai - Crunchyroll
- Failure Frame: I Became the Strongest and Annihilated Everything with Low-Level Spells - Crunchyroll
- Fairy Tail: 100 Years Quest - Crunchyroll
- Grendizer U - Shahid (streaming platform)
- I Parry Everything - Hidive
- Kengan Ashura Season 2, Part 2 - Netflix
- Kimi ni Todoke: From Me to You Season 3 - Netflix
- Kinnikuman: Perfect Origin Arc - Netflix
- Love Is Indivisible by Twins - Crunchyroll
- The Magical Girl and the Evil Lieutenant Used to Be Archenemies - Crunchyroll
- Makeine: Too Many Losing Heroines! - Crunchyroll
- Mayonaka Punch - Crunchyroll
- Monogatari: Off & Monster Season - Crunchyroll
- My Deer Friend Nokotan - Amazon Freevee, Amazon Prime Video, Anime Onegai, Animation Digital Network, Crunchyroll, Tubi & YouTube
- My Wife Has No Emotion - Crunchyroll
- Narenare -Cheer for You!- - Crunchyroll
- Nier: Automata Ver1.1a Part 2 - Crunchyroll
- No Longer Allowed in Another World - Crunchyroll
- The Ossan Newbie Adventurer, Trained to Death by the Most Powerful Party, Became Invincible - Crunchyroll
- Oshi no Ko Season 2 - Hidive
- Our Last Crusade or the Rise of a New World Season 2 - Crunchyroll, Disney+ & Hulu (Season 2 was paused after episode 4 due to production issues)
- Plus-Sized Elf - Hidive
- Pseudo Harem - Crunchyroll
- Quality Assurance in Another World - Crunchyroll
- Red Cat Ramen - Crunchyroll
- Rick and Morty: The Anime - Adult Swim, HBO GO, HBO Asia & Max
- Rising Impact Season 2 - Netflix
- Sakuna: Of Rice and Ruin - Crunchyroll & Netflix
- Sengoku Youko Part 2 - Crunchyroll
- Senpai Is an Otokonoko - Crunchyroll
- SHY Season 2 - Crunchyroll
- Shōshimin: How to Become Ordinary - Crunchyroll
- Star Blazers: Space Battleship Yamato 3199 - Crunchyroll
- The Strongest Magician in the Demon Lord's Army was a Human - Crunchyroll
- Suicide Squad Isekai - HBO GO, HBO Asia, Max, Animation Digital Network, Bilibili, Disney+ & Hulu
- Tasūketsu: Fate of the Majority - Crunchyroll
- Terminator Zero - Netflix
- Theatre of Darkness: Yamishibai: 13 - Crunchyroll
- Tower of God Season 2 - Crunchyroll
- True Beauty - Crunchyroll
- Twilight Out of Focus - Crunchyroll
- VTuber Legend: How I Went Viral After Forgetting to Turn Off My Stream - Crunchyroll
- Why Does Nobody Remember Me in This World? - Crunchyroll
- Wistoria: Wand and Sword - Crunchyroll
- Yoasobi Gurashi! - Coolmic (uncut) & YouTube (censored)

=== Fall ===
- 365 Days to the Wedding - Crunchyroll
- A Terrified Teacher at Ghoul School! - Crunchyroll
- Acro Trip - Crunchyroll
- After-School Hanako-kun Season 2 - Crunchyroll
- Arifureta: From Commonplace to World's Strongest Season 3 - Crunchyroll, Disney+ & Hulu
- As a Reincarnated Aristocrat, I'll Use My Appraisal Skill to Rise in the World Season 2 - Crunchyroll
- Bananya Around the World - Crunchyroll
- Beastars Final Season Part 1 - Netflix
- Bleach: Thousand-Year Blood War Part 3 - Disney+ & Hulu
- Blue Box - Netflix
- Blue Exorcist: At the End of the Snow Chapter - Crunchyroll
- Blue Lock vs. U-20 Japan - Crunchyroll
- Blue Miburo - Crunchyroll
- Dandadan - Crunchyroll, Animation Digital Network, Disney+, Hulu & Netflix
- Demon Lord 2099 - Crunchyroll
- Demon Lord, Retry! R - Crunchyroll, Disney+ & Hulu
- The Do-Over Damsel Conquers the Dragon Emperor - Crunchyroll
- Dragon Ball Daima - Crunchyroll, Animation Digital Network, Disney+, Hulu, Max & Netflix
- Four Knights of the Apocalypse Season 2 - Netflix
- Future's Folktales Season 2 - Hidive
- Goodbye, Dragon Life - Crunchyroll
- Haigakura - Amazon Prime Video, Anime Onegai & YouTube
- The Healer Who Was Banished From His Party, Is, in Fact, the Strongest - Crunchyroll
- How I Attended an All-Guy's Mixer - Hidive
- Hyakushō Kizoku Season 2 - Animation Digital Network
- I'll Become a Villainess Who Goes Down in History - Crunchyroll
- The Idolmaster Shiny Colors Season 2 - Crunchyroll
- Is It Wrong to Try to Pick Up Girls in a Dungeon? V - Hidive
- KamiErabi God.app Season 2 - Crunchyroll
- Kinokoinu: Mushroom Pup - Crunchyroll
- Let This Grieving Soul Retire! - Crunchyroll
- Loner Life in Another World - Hidive
- Love Live! Superstar!! Season 3 - Crunchyroll
- Magilumiere Co. Ltd. - Amazon Prime Video
- Mechanical Arms - Crunchyroll
- MF Ghost Season 2 - Crunchyroll
- The Most Notorious "Talker" Runs the World's Greatest Clan - Crunchyroll
- Murai no Koi - Disney+ & Hulu
- Natsume's Book of Friends Season 7 - Crunchyroll
- Negative Positive Angler - Crunchyroll
- Nina the Starry Bride - Crunchyroll
- Orb: On the Movements of the Earth - Netflix
- The Prince of Tennis II: U-17 World Cup Semifinal - Crunchyroll
- Puniru is a Kawaii Slime - Crunchyroll & Netflix
- Ranma ½ - Netflix
- Re:Zero − Starting Life in Another World Season 3 - Crunchyroll
- Ron Kamonohashi Season 2 - Crunchyroll
- Rurouni Kenshin: Kyoto Disturbance - Crunchyroll
- Seirei Gensouki: Spirit Chronicles Season 2 - Crunchyroll
- Shangri-La Frontier Season 2 - Crunchyroll
- The Stories of Girls Who Couldn't Be Magicians - Crunchyroll
- Sword Art Online Alternative Gun Gale Online Season 2 - Crunchyroll
- TsumaSho - Crunchyroll
- Tonbo! Season 2 - Amazon Prime Video, Anime Onegai, Animation Digital Network, Tubi & YouTube
- Trillion Game - Crunchyroll
- Tying the Knot with an Amagami Sister - Crunchyroll
- Uzumaki - Adult Swim & Max
- Yakuza Fiancé - Crunchyroll
- You Are Ms. Servant - Crunchyroll

== 2025 ==
=== Winter ===
- The 100 Girlfriends Who Really, Really, Really, Really, Really Love You Season 2 - Crunchyroll
- Ameku M.D.: Doctor Detective - Crunchyroll
- Anyway, I'm Falling in Love with You - Crunchyroll
- The Apothecary Diaries Season 2 - Crunchyroll
- Aquarion: Myth of Emotions - Crunchyroll
- Ave Mujica - The Die is Cast - - Crunchyroll
- Baban Baban Ban Vampire - Netflix
- Beheneko: The Elf-Girl's Cat is Secretly an S-Ranked Monster! - Hidive
- Bogus Skill "Fruitmaster" - Crunchyroll
- CARDFIGHT!! VANGUARD Divinez Deluxe-hen - YouTube
- The Daily Life of a Middle-Aged Online Shopper in Another World - Crunchyroll
- Dr. Stone: Science Future Part 1 - Crunchyroll
- Even Given the Worthless "Appraiser" Class, I'm Actually the Strongest - Crunchyroll
- Farmagia - Crunchyroll
- Fate/strange Fake - Crunchyroll
- Flower and Asura - Hidive
- From Bureaucrat to Villainess: Dad's Been Reincarnated! - Hidive
- Grisaia: Phantom Trigger - Crunchyroll
- Headhunted to Another World: From Salaryman to Big Four! - Crunchyroll
- Honey Lemon Soda - Crunchyroll
- I Got Married to the Girl I Hate Most in Class - Crunchyroll
- I Left My A-Rank Party to Help My Former Students Reach the Dungeon Depths! - Crunchyroll
- I May Be a Guild Receptionist, But I'll Solo Any Boss to Clock Out on Time - Crunchyroll
- I Want to Escape from Princess Lessons - Crunchyroll
- I'm a Noble on the Brink of Ruin, So I Might as Well Try Mastering Magic - Crunchyroll
- I'm Living with an Otaku NEET Kunoichi? - Hidive
- Ishura Season 2 - Disney+ & Hulu
- Kinnikuman: Perfect Origin Arc Season 2 - Netflix
- Link Click: Bridon Arc - Bilibili & Crunchyroll
- Magic Maker: How to Make Magic in Another World - Crunchyroll
- Medaka Kuroiwa Is Impervious to My Charms - Crunchyroll
- Medalist - Disney+ & Hulu
- Momentary Lily - Crunchyroll
- My Happy Marriage Season 2 - Netflix
- Okitsura - Crunchyroll
- Possibly the Greatest Alchemist of All Time - Crunchyroll
- Promise of Wizard - Crunchyroll
- Re:Zero − Starting Life in Another World Season 3, Part 2 - Crunchyroll
- The Red Ranger Becomes an Adventurer in Another World - Crunchyroll
- Sakamoto Days - Netflix
- Solo Leveling: Arise from the Shadow - Crunchyroll
- Sorairo Utility - Hidive
- Tasokare Hotel - Amazon Prime Video, Anime Onegai, Tubi, Plex, Bilibili & YouTube
- Theatre of Darkness: Yamishibai: 14 - Crunchyroll
- Toilet-Bound Hanako-kun Season 2 - Crunchyroll, Disney+ & Hulu
- Übel Blatt - Amazon Prime Video
- UniteUp! -Uni:Birth- - Crunchyroll
- Unnamed Memory Act.2 - Crunchyroll
- Welcome to Japan, Ms. Elf! - Crunchyroll
- Zenshu - Crunchyroll

=== Spring ===
- #Compass 2.0: Combat Providence Analysis System - Crunchyroll
- A Ninja and an Assassin Under One Roof - Crunchyroll
- Aharen-san wa Hakarenai Season 2 - Crunchyroll
- Anne Shirley - Crunchyroll
- Apocalypse Hotel - Crunchyroll
- The Beginning After the End - Crunchyroll
- Black Butler: Emerald Witch Arc - Crunchyroll
- The Brilliant Healer's New Life in the Shadows - Crunchyroll
- Bye Bye, Earth Season 2 - Crunchyroll
- Can a Boy-Girl Friendship Survive? - Crunchyroll
- Catch Me at the Ballpark! - Crunchyroll
- Classic Stars - Crunchyroll
- Devil May Cry - Netflix
- The Dinner Table Detective - Amazon Prime Video
- Fire Force Season 3, Part 1 - Crunchyroll, Disney+ & Hulu
- Food for the Soul - Crunchyroll
- From Old Country Bumpkin to Master Swordsman - Amazon Prime Video
- Gag Manga Biyori Go - Amazon Prime Video, Anime Onegai & YouTube
- Go! Go! Loser Ranger! Season 2 - Disney+ & Hulu
- The Gorilla God's Go-To Girl - Crunchyroll
- Guilty Gear Strive: Dual Rulers - Crunchyroll
- I'm the Evil Lord of an Intergalactic Empire! - Crunchyroll
- I've Been Killing Slimes for 300 Years and Maxed Out My Level Season 2 - Crunchyroll
- Kowloon Generic Romance - Crunchyroll
- Lazarus - Adult Swim & Max
- Lycoris Recoil: Friends are thieves of time - Crunchyroll & YouTube
- Maebashi Witches - Crunchyroll
- Makina-san's a Love Bot?! - OceanVeil
- Miru: Paths to My Future - Anime Onegai & YouTube
- Mobile Suit Gundam GQuuuuuuX - Amazon Prime Video
- Mono - Crunchyroll
- My Hero Academia: Vigilantes - Crunchyroll
- Once Upon a Witch's Death - Crunchyroll
- One Piece: Egghead Arc Part 2 - Crunchyroll
- Please Put Them On, Takamine-san - Crunchyroll
- Reincarnated as a Neglected Noble: Raising My Baby Brother With Memories From My Past Life - Crunchyroll
- Rock Is a Lady's Modesty - Hidive
- The Shiunji Family Children - Crunchyroll
- Shōshimin: How to Become Ordinary Season 2 - Crunchyroll
- Summer Pockets - Crunchyroll
- Sword of the Demon Hunter: Kijin Gentōshō - Hidive
- Teogonia - Crunchyroll
- To Be Hero X - Crunchyroll
- The Too-Perfect Saint: Tossed Aside by My Fiancé and Sold to Another Kingdom - Crunchyroll
- Umamusume: Cinderella Gray - Amazon Prime Video, Animation Digital Network, Anime Onegai & YouTube
- The Unaware Atelier Master - Crunchyroll
- Wind Breaker Season 2 - Crunchyroll
- Witch Watch - Crunchyroll, Animation Digital Network, Disney+, Hulu & Netflix
- Yaiba: Samurai Legend - Hulu & Netflix
- Yandere Dark Elf: She Chased Me All the Way From Another World! - Hidive
- Your Forma - Anime Onegai, Animation Digital Network, Samsung TV Plus & YouTube
- Zatsu Tabi: That's Journey - Crunchyroll

=== Summer ===
- Apocalypse Bringer Mynoghra: World Conquest Starts with the Civilization of Ruin - Crunchyroll
- Arknights: Rise from Ember - Crunchyroll
- Bad Girl - Hidive
- Betrothed to My Sister's Ex - Crunchyroll
- Bullet/Bullet - Disney+ & Hulu
- Call of the Night Season 2 - Hidive
- Captivated, by You - Crunchyroll
- CARDFIGHT!! VANGUARD Divinez Deluxe Kesshō-hen - YouTube
- Chuhai Lips: Canned Flavor of Married Women - OceanVeil
- CITY the Animation - Amazon Prime Video
- A Couple of Cuckoos Season 2 - Crunchyroll
- Clevatess - Crunchyroll
- Cultural Exchange with a Game Centre Girl - Crunchyroll
- Dandadan Season 2 - Crunchyroll, Animation Digital Network, Hulu, Disney+ & Netflix
- Dealing with Mikadono Sisters is a Breeze - Crunchyroll
- Dekin no Mogura: The Earthbound Mole - Crunchyroll
- Detectives These Days Are Crazy! - Crunchyroll
- Dr. Stone: Science Future Part 2 - Crunchyroll
- Dragon Raja: The Mourner’s Eyes - Crunchyroll
- Fermat Kitchen - Samsung TV Plus & YouTube
- The Fragrant Flower Blooms with Dignity - Netflix
- Gachiakuta - Crunchyroll
- Grand Blue Dreaming Season 2 - Crunchyroll
- Hell Teacher: Jigoku Sensei Nube - Anime Onegai & YouTube
- Hotel Inhumans - Crunchyroll
- I Was Reincarnated as the 7th Prince so I Can Take My Time Perfecting My Magical Ability Season 2 - Crunchyroll
- Kaiju No. 8 Season 2 - Crunchyroll & Twitter
- Kamitsubaki City Under Construction - Crunchyroll
- Let's Go Karaoke! - Crunchyroll
- Leviathan - Netflix
- Lord of Mysteries - Crunchyroll
- Mr. Osomatsu Season 4 - Crunchyroll
- My Dress-Up Darling Season 2 - Crunchyroll
- My Melody & Kuromi - Netflix
- Necronomico and the Cosmic Horror Show - Crunchyroll
- New Saga - Crunchyroll
- New Panty & Stocking with Garterbelt - Amazon Prime Video
- Night of the Living Cat - Crunchyroll
- Nukitashi the Animation - OceanVeil
- Onmyō Kaiten Re:verse - Crunchyroll
- Private Tutor to the Duke's Daughter - Crunchyroll
- Puniru is a Kawaii Slime Season 2 - Crunchyroll & Netflix
- Rascal Does Not Dream of Santa Claus - Crunchyroll & Hulu
- Reborn as a Vending Machine, I Now Wander the Dungeon Season 2 - Crunchyroll
- Rent-A-Girlfriend Season 4 - Crunchyroll
- The Rising of the Shield Hero Season 4 - Crunchyroll
- Ruri Rocks - Crunchyroll
- Sakamoto Days Part 2 - Netflix
- Scooped Up by an S-Rank Adventurer! - Crunchyroll
- Secrets of the Silent Witch - Crunchyroll
- See You Tomorrow at the Food Court - Crunchyroll
- The Shy Hero and the Assassin Princesses - Crunchyroll
- Solo Camping for Two - Crunchyroll
- The Summer Hikaru Died - Netflix
- Takopi's Original Sin - Crunchyroll
- Theatre of Darkness: Yamishibai: 15 - Crunchyroll
- There's No Freaking Way I'll be Your Lover! Unless... - Anime Onegai, Plex & YouTube
- Tougen Anki: Legend of the Cursed Blood - Amazon Prime Video, Anime Onegai, Animation Digital Network, Crunchyroll, Netflix & Samsung TV Plus
- Toilet-Bound Hanako-kun Season 2, Part 2 - Crunchyroll, Disney+ & Hulu
- Turkey! Time to Strike - Crunchyroll
- Uglymug, Epicfighter - Crunchyroll
- Watari-kun's ****** Is About to Collapse - Crunchyroll
- The Water Magician - Crunchyroll
- Welcome to the Outcast's Restaurant! - Crunchyroll
- With You and the Rain - Crunchyroll

=== Fall ===
Starting this season, distributor Remow announced the closure of Anime Onegai in Latin America, with some of its series being streamed on Amazon Prime Video, Crunchyroll, and Netflix.

- A Gatherer's Adventure in Isekai - Crunchyroll
- A Mangaka's Weirdly Wonderful Workplace - Crunchyroll
- A Star Brighter Than the Sun - Amazon Prime Video
- A Wild Last Boss Appeared! - Crunchyroll
- Alma-chan Wants to Be a Family! - Crunchyroll
- The Banished Court Magician Aims to Become the Strongest - Crunchyroll
- Campfire Cooking in Another World with My Absurd Skill Season 2 - Crunchyroll
- Cat's Eye - Disney+ & Hulu
- Chitose Is in the Ramune Bottle - Crunchyroll
- Dad is a Hero, Mom is a Spirit, I'm a Reincarnator - Crunchyroll
- The Daily Life of the Immortal King Season 5 - Bilibili & Crunchyroll
- The Dark History of the Reincarnated Villainess - Crunchyroll
- Digimon Beatbreak - Crunchyroll, Disney+ & Hulu
- Disney Twisted-Wonderland: The Animation - Disney+ & Hulu
- Dusk Beyond the End of the World - Hidive
- The Fated Magical Princess: Who Made Me a Princess - Crunchyroll
- Ganzo! Bandori-chan - YouTube
- Gintama: Mr. Ginpachi's Zany Class - Anime.com, Crunchyroll, Disney+ & Hulu
- Gnosia - Crunchyroll
- Hands Off: Sawaranaide Kotesashi-kun - Crunchyroll & OceanVeil
- Hero Without a Class - Hidive
- Inexpressive Kashiwada and Expressive Oota - Crunchyroll
- Isekai Quartet Season 3 - Crunchyroll
- Kakuriyo: Bed and Breakfast for Spirits Season 2 - Crunchyroll
- Kingdom 5 - Crunchyroll
- Let This Grieving Soul Retire! Part 2 - Crunchyroll
- Let's Play - Crunchyroll
- Li'l Miss Vampire Can't Suck Right - Crunchyroll
- May I Ask for One Final Thing? - Crunchyroll
- Mechanical Marie - Crunchyroll
- Monster Strike: Deadverse Reloaded - Amazon Prime Video
- My Friend's Little Sister Has It In for Me! - Crunchyroll
- My Hero Academia Final Season - Crunchyroll, Disney+ & Hulu
- My Gift Lvl 9999 Unlimited Gacha: Backstabbed in a Backwater Dungeon, I'm Out for Revenge! - Hidive
- My Awkward Senpai - Crunchyroll
- My Status as an Assassin Obviously Exceeds the Hero's - Crunchyroll
- Ninja vs. Gokudo - Amazon Prime Video
- One Punch Man Season 3 - Disney+ & Hulu
- Pass the Monster Meat, Milady! - Crunchyroll
- Plus-Sized Misadventures in Love! - Crunchyroll
- Ranma ½ Season 2 - Netflix
- Record of Ragnarok Season 3 - Netflix
- Sanda - Amazon Prime Video
- Shabake - Crunchyroll
- So You're Raising a Warrior - Crunchyroll
- Si-Vis: The Sound of Heroes - Crunchyroll
- Spy × Family Season 3 - Crunchyroll, Disney+ & Hulu
- Tales of Wedding Rings Season 2 - Crunchyroll
- Tatsuki Fujimoto 17-26 - Amazon Prime Video
- This Monster Wants to Eat Me - Crunchyroll
- To Your Eternity Season 3 - Crunchyroll
- Tojima Wants to Be a Kamen Rider - Crunchyroll
- Touring After the Apocalypse - Crunchyroll
- Umamusume: Cinderella Gray Part 2 - Amazon Prime Video & YouTube
- Wandance - Disney+ & Hulu
- With You, Our Love Will Make It Through - Crunchyroll
- Yano-kun's Ordinary Days - Crunchyroll

== 2026 ==
=== Winter ===
- A Gentle Noble's Vacation Recommendation - Crunchyroll
- A Misanthrope Teaches a Class for Demi-Humans - Crunchyroll
- Anyway, I'm Falling in Love with You Season 2 - Crunchyroll
- Beastars Final Season Part 2 - Netflix
- Blue Miburo Season 2 - Crunchyroll & OceanVeil
- CARDFIGHT!! VANGUARD Divinez Genma Seisen-hen - YouTube
- The Case Book of Arne - Crunchyroll
- Chained Soldier Season 2 - Hidive
- Champignon Witch - Crunchyroll
- Dark Moon: The Blood Altar - Crunchyroll
- The Daily Life of a Part-time Torturer - Crunchyroll
- The Daily Life of a Single 29-Year-Old Adventurer - Crunchyroll
- The Darwin Incident - Amazon Prime Video
- Dead Account - Crunchyroll
- The Demon King's Daughter is Too Kind!! - Crunchyroll
- Easygoing Territory Defense by the Optimistic Lord - Crunchyroll
- Fire Force Season 3, Part 2 - Crunchyroll, Disney+ & Hulu
- Frieren: Beyond Journey’s End Season 2 - Crunchyroll
- Golden Kamuy Final Season - Crunchyroll
- Hana-Kimi - Crunchyroll
- Hell Mode - Hidive
- Hell Teacher: Jigoku Sensei Nube Part 2 - Amazon Prime Video & YouTube
- High School! Kimengumi - Amazon Prime Video
- The Holy Grail of Eris - Crunchyroll
- Ichigo Aika: Strawberry Elegy - OceanVeil
- In the Clear Moonlit Dusk - Crunchyroll
- The Invisible Man and His Soon-to-Be Wife - Crunchyroll
- Isekai Office Worker: The Other World's Books Depend on the Bean Counter - Crunchyroll
- Jack-of-All-Trades, Party of None - Crunchyroll
- Journal with Witch - Crunchyroll
- Jujutsu Kaisen Season 3 - Crunchyroll
- Kaya-chan Isn't Scary - Crunchyroll
- Kunon the Sorcerer Can See - Crunchyroll
- Love Through a Prism - Netflix
- Medalist Season 2 - Disney+ & Hulu
- MF Ghost Season 3 - Crunchyroll
- My Hero Academia: Vigilantes Season 2 - Crunchyroll
- Noble Reincarnation: Born Blessed, So I'll Obtain Ultimate Power - Crunchyroll
- Oedo Fire Slayer: The Legend of Phoenix - Crunchyroll
- Oshi no Ko Season 3 - Crunchyroll & Hidive
- The Outcast Season 6 - Crunchyroll
- Reincarnated as a Dragon Hatchling - Hidive
- Roll Over and Die - Crunchyroll
- Scum of the Brave - Crunchyroll
- Sentenced to Be a Hero - Crunchyroll
- SHIBOYUGI: Playing Death Games to Put Food on the Table - Crunchyroll & Netflix
- Tamon's B-Side - Crunchyroll
- Theatre of Darkness: Yamishibai: 16 - Crunchyroll
- There Was a Cute Girl in the Hero's Party, So I Tried Confessing to Her - Crunchyroll
- 'Tis Time for "Torture," Princess Season 2 - Crunchyroll
- Trigun Stargaze - Crunchyroll
- Tune In to the Midnight Heart - Crunchyroll
- The Villainess Is Adored by the Prince of the Neighbor Kingdom - Crunchyroll
- Yoroi Shinden Samurai Troopers - Crunchyroll
- You and I Are Polar Opposites - Crunchyroll
- You Can't Be in a Rom-Com with Your Childhood Friends! - Crunchyroll

=== Spring ===
- A Hundred Scenes of Awajima - Crunchyroll
- Ace of Diamond Act II Season 2 - Crunchyroll
- Agents of the Four Seasons: Dance of Spring - Crunchyroll
- Akane-banashi - Netflix & YouTube
- Always a Catch! - Crunchyroll
- An Observation Log of My Fiancée Who Calls Herself a Villainess - Crunchyroll
- The Angel Next Door Spoils Me Rotten Season 2 - Crunchyroll
- Ascendance of a Bookworm Season 4 - Crunchyroll
- The Beginning After the End Season 2 - Crunchyroll
- Botan Kamiina Fully Blossoms When Drunk - Crunchyroll
- Candy Caries - Amazon Prime Video & YouTube
- The Classroom of a Black Cat and a Witch - Crunchyroll
- Classroom of the Elite 4: Second Year, First Semester - Crunchyroll
- Daemons of the Shadow Realm - Crunchyroll, Disney+, Hulu and Netflix
- Devil May Cry Season 2 - Netflix
- Do You Like Big Girls? - OceanVeil
- Dorohedoro Season 2 - Crunchyroll, Disney+, Rakuten Viki & Netflix
- Dr. Stone: Science Future Part 3 - Crunchyroll
- Drops of God - Crunchyroll
- Eren the Southpaw - Crunchyroll
- Even a Replica Can Fall in Love - Crunchyroll
- Farming Life in Another World Season 2 - Hidive
- Fist of the North Star - Amazon Prime Video
- The Food Diary of Miss Maid - Crunchyroll
- Gals Can't Be Kind to Otaku!? - Crunchyroll
- Ghost Concert: Missing Songs - Crunchyroll
- Go for It, Nakamura! - Crunchyroll
- Haibara's Teenage New Game+ - Crunchyroll
- I Made Friends with the Second Prettiest Girl in My Class - Crunchyroll
- I Want to End This Love Game - Crunchyroll
- Ichijyoma Mankitsu Gurashi! - Amazon Prime Video, OceanVeil, Rakuten Viki and YouTube
- Kill Blue - Amazon Prime Video, Animation Digital Network, Crunchyroll, Netflix, Samsung TV Plus, Plex, Tubi, DirecTV, Xumo, Rakuten Viki and YouTube
- Killed Again, Mr. Detective? - Crunchyroll
- Kirio Fanclub - Hidive
- The Klutzy Class Monitor and the Girl with the Short Skirt - Crunchyroll
- Kujima: Why Sing, When You Can Warble? - Crunchyroll
- Kusunoki's Garden of Gods - Crunchyroll
- Liar Game - Crunchyroll
- Magical Sisters LuluttoLilly - YouTube
- Mao - Disney+, & Hulu
- Marika's Love Meter Malfunction - OceanVeil
- Marriagetoxin - Crunchyroll
- Mission: Yozakura Family Season 2 - Disney+, & Hulu
- Mistress Kanan Is Devilishly Easy - Crunchyroll
- Monster Eater - Samsung TV Plus
- The Most Heretical Last Boss Queen Season 2 - Hidive
- My Ribdiculous Reincarnation - Crunchyroll
- Needy Streamer Overload - Crunchyroll
- Nippon Sangoku - Amazon Prime Video
- One Piece: Elbaph Arc - Crunchyroll
- Petals of Reincarnation - Hidive
- The Ramparts of Ice - Netflix
- Re:Zero − Starting Life in Another World Season 4 - Crunchyroll
- Reborn as a Vending Machine, I Now Wander the Dungeon Season 3 - Crunchyroll
- Rent-A-Girlfriend Season 5 - Crunchyroll
- Rilakkuma - Crunchyroll & YouTube
- Rooster Fighter - Adult Swim, Disney+, & Hulu
- Snowball Earth - Crunchyroll, Disney+, & Hulu
- The Strongest Job Is Apparently Not a Hero or a Sage, but an Appraiser (Provisional)! - Crunchyroll
- That Time I Got Reincarnated as a Slime Season 4, Part 1 - Crunchyroll
- The Warrior Princess and the Barbaric King - Crunchyroll
- Welcome to Demon School! Iruma-kun Season 4 - Crunchyroll
- Wistoria: Wand and Sword Season 2 - Crunchyroll
- Witch Hat Atelier - Crunchyroll
- Yowayowa Sensei - Hidive

=== Summer ===
- The 100 Girlfriends Who Really, Really, Really, Really, Really Love You Season 3 - Crunchyroll
- A Livid Lady's Guide to Getting Even: How I Crushed My Homeland with My Mighty Grimoires - Crunchyroll
- Azur Lane: Slow Ahead! Season 2 - Crunchyroll
- BanG Dream! Yume∞Mita - Crunchyroll
- Black Torch - Crunchyroll
- Bleach: Thousand-Year Blood War Part 4 - Disney+ & Hulu
- Bungo Stray Dogs Wan! Season 2 - Crunchyroll
- The Cat and the Dragon - Crunchyroll
- Chainsmoker Cat - Netflix & OceanVeil
- Clevatess Season 2 - Crunchyroll
- Crowned in a Hundred Days - Crunchyroll
- Dara-san of Reiwa - Crunchyroll
- Draw This, Then Die! - Crunchyroll
- The Duke's Son Claims He Won't Love Me yet Showers Me with Adoration - Crunchyroll
- The Elusive Samurai Season 2 - Crunchyroll
- The Exiled Heavy Knight Knows How to Game the System - Crunchyroll
- The Forsaken Saintess and Her Foodie Roadtrip in Another World - Hidive
- From Old Country Bumpkin to Master Swordsman Season 2 - Amazon Prime Video
- From Overshadowed to Overpowered - Crunchyroll
- The Frontier Lord Begins with Zero Subjects - Crunchyroll
- The Ghost in the Shell - Amazon Prime Video
- Goodbye, Lara - Crunchyroll
- Grand Blue Dreaming Season 3 - Crunchyroll
- Grow Up Show - Crunchyroll
- Hana-Kimi Season 2 - Crunchyroll
- Hanaori-san Still Wants to Fight in the Next Life - Crunchyroll
- Hell Mode Season 2 - Hidive
- Heroine? Saint? No, I'm an All-Works Maid (and Proud of It)! - Crunchyroll
- I Became a Legend After My 10 Year-Long Last Stand - Crunchyroll
- I Want to Love You Till Your Dying Day - Crunchyroll
- The Insipid Prince's Furtive Grab for The Throne - Crunchyroll
- Iron Wok Jan - Crunchyroll
- Jaadugar: A Witch in Mongolia - Crunchyroll
- Kaiju Girl Caramelise - Crunchyroll
- Kamui: He's Behind You - OceanVeil
- Let's Go Kaikigumi - Crunchyroll
- Link Click Season 3 - Bilibili & Crunchyroll
- Love Unseen Beneath the Clear Night Sky - Crunchyroll
- Magical Girl Lyrical Nanoha Exceeds Gun Blaze Vengeance - Crunchyroll
- Magilumiere Co. Ltd. Season 2 - Amazon Prime Video
- Mebius Dust - Crunchyroll
- Mushoku Tensei: Jobless Reincarnation Season 3 - Crunchyroll
- My Classmate's a Sexy Actress, and Now We Live Together?! - OceanVeil
- My Stepmother and Stepsisters Aren't Wicked - Amazon Prime Video, Rakuten Viki and YouTube
- The Oblivious Saint Can't Contain Her Power - Crunchyroll
- The Ogre's Bride - Crunchyroll
- Oh Boy, Was I Wrong About Her - Crunchyroll
- One Piece: Heroines - Crunchyroll
- Please Excuse My Younger Brothers - Crunchyroll
- Re:Zero − Starting Life in Another World Season 4, Part 2 - Crunchyroll
- Recommendations from Iwamoto-Senpai - Crunchyroll
- Red River - Crunchyroll
- Rich Girl Caretaker - Crunchyroll
- The Saga of Tanya the Evil Season 2 - Crunchyroll
- Skeleton Knight in Another World Season 2 - Crunchyroll
- Smoking Behind the Supermarket with You - Crunchyroll
- Sparks of Tomorrow - Netflix
- Though I Am an Inept Villainess - Crunchyroll, Disney+, & Hulu
- Thunder 3 - Netflix
- Tomb Raider King - Crunchyroll
- Trapped in a Dating Sim: The World of Otome Games is Tough for Mobs Season 2 - Crunchyroll
- Victoria of Many Faces - Crunchyroll
- The Villager of Level 999 - Crunchyroll
- The World is Dancing - Hidive
- The World's Strongest Rearguard - Crunchyroll
- Yoroi Shinden Samurai Troopers Part 2 - Crunchyroll
- You and I Are Polar Opposites Season 2 - Crunchyroll
- Young Ladies Don't Play Fighting Games - Crunchyroll

=== Fall ===
- #I'm Looking for a Zombie - Crunchyroll
- A Certain Dark Item - Crunchyroll
- A Returner's Magic Should Be Special Season 2 - Crunchyroll
- A Tale of the Secret Saint - Crunchyroll
- A Wild Last Boss Appeared! Season 2 - Crunchyroll
- Ace of Diamond Act II Season 2, Part 2 - Crunchyroll
- Aoashi Season 2 - Crunchyroll
- The Apothecary Diaries Season 3, Part 1 - Crunchyroll
- As a Reincarnated Aristocrat, I'll Use My Appraisal Skill to Rise in the World Season 3 - Crunchyroll
- Battle Spirits [Re] Zekkai no Kū - Crunchyroll
- Black Clover II - Crunchyroll
- Blue Box Season 2 - Netflix
- Chitose Is in the Ramune Bottle Part 2 - Crunchyroll
- The Cold Sato-san Is Only Sweet to Me - Crunchyroll
- Cyberpunk: Edgerunners 2 - Netflix
- Dandivine - Crunchyroll
- Dark Machine: The Animation - Crunchyroll
- The Detective Is Already Dead Season 2 - Crunchyroll
- Devils' Crest - Amazon Prime Video
- Dragon Ball Super: Beerus - Crunchyroll, Disney+, Hulu, & Netflix
- Dreamland - Crunchyroll
- Disney Twisted-Wonderland: The Animation Season 2 - Disney+ & Hulu
- Even the Student Council Has Its Holes! - OceanVeil
- Even Though I'm a Super Timid Noble Girl, I Accepted the Bet From My Cunning Fiancé - Crunchyroll
- Firefly Wedding - Crunchyroll
- Fool Night - Netflix
- From Far Away - Crunchyroll
- Full Clearing Another World Under a Goddess with Zero Believers - Crunchyroll
- FX Fighter Kurumi-chan - Crunchyroll
- Ghost Meets Gal! - YouTube
- Hello, I am a Witch, and My Crush Wants Me to Make a Love Potion! - Crunchyroll
- Horror Collector - Crunchyroll
- Hotel Inhumans Season 2 - Crunchyroll
- I'm Dating a Dark Summoner - Hidive
- The Iceblade Sorcerer Shall Rule the World II - Crunchyroll
- The Laid-Off Cheat-Granting Mage Enjoys a Second Lease on Life - Crunchyroll
- The Lonely Snow Widow and the Cursed Ring - OceanVeil
- Magic Knight Rayearth - Crunchyroll
- Magic Repo Man - Crunchyroll
- Magical Explorer - Crunchyroll
- Magical Girl Raising Project: Restart - OceanVeil
- Magical Sisters LuluttoLilly Part 2 - YouTube
- Mission: Yozakura Family Season 2, Part 2 - Disney+ & Hulu
- My Girlfriend's Friend - OceanVeil
- Nia Liston: The Merciless Maiden - Hidive
- Overgeared - Crunchyroll
- Paw & Palaces - Crunchyroll
- The Prince of Tennis II: U-17 WORLD CUP: Final Member Selection Match - Crunchyroll
- PSYЯEN - Crunchyroll
- The Ramparts of Ice Season 2 - Netflix
- Ranma ½ Season 3 - Netflix
- Reborn as a Space Mercenary - Crunchyroll
- Reincarnated as a Sword II - Hidive
- Romelia War Chronicle - Crunchyroll
- Sasaki and Peeps Season 2 - Crunchyroll
- The Seven Knights of the Marronnier Kingdom - Amazon Prime Video
- Sgt. Frog☆ - Crunchyroll
- So What's Wrong with Getting Reborn as a Goblin? - Crunchyroll
- Spirit Circle - Remow
- Steel Ball Run: JoJo's Bizarre Adventure - Netflix
- Suikoden: The Anime - Crunchyroll & YouTube
- Super Psychic Policeman Chojo - Crunchyroll
- Tank Chair - Amazon Prime Video
- Tetsuryō! Meet with Tetsudō Musume - Hidive
- Tokyo Revengers: War of the Three Titans Arc - Disney+ & Hulu
- Tougen Anki: Nikko Kegon Falls Arc - Amazon Prime Video, Animation Digital Network, Crunchyroll, Netflix, & Samsung TV Plus
- Uncle's Obsession with Cute Things - Crunchyroll
- The Vermilion Mask - Crunchyroll
- Vertex Force - Crunchyroll
- Welsh & Shedar - YouTube
- The World's Strongest Witch - Crunchyroll

== 2027 ==
=== Winter ===
- Akane-banashi Season 2 - Netflix & YouTube
- BanG Dream! MyGO!!!!! // Ave Mujica - Crunchyroll
- Bless - Crunchyroll
- Bride of the Barrier Master - Netflix
- Dengeki Daisy - Crunchyroll
- The Eternal Fool's Words of Wisdom: A Pawsitively Fantastic Adventure - Crunchyroll
- The Fable Season 2 - Disney+, Star+ & Hulu
- Gacha Girls Corps - Crunchyroll
- Giant Ojō-sama - Hidive
- The Guy She Was Interested in Wasn't a Guy at All - Crunchyroll
- Hirayasumi - Netflix
- I Got a Cheat Skill in Another World and Became Unrivaled in the Real World, Too Season 2 - Crunchyroll
- Magical Buffs: The Support Caster Is Stronger Than He Realized! - Crunchyroll
- Marriagetoxin Season 2 - Crunchyroll
- Mashle: Magic and Muscles Season 3 - Crunchyroll
- Medaka Kuroiwa Is Impervious to My Charms Season 2 - Crunchyroll
- Murciélago - Hidive
- The One Piece - Netflix
- One Punch Man Season 3, Part 2 - Disney+ & Hulu
- Otherworldly Munchkin: Let's Speedrun the Dungeon with Only 1 HP! - Crunchyroll
- Red Cat Ramen Season 2 - Crunchyroll
- Red Riding Hood: A Detective Story - Crunchyroll
- Sakamoto Days Season 2 - Netflix
- Sekiro: No Defeat - Crunchyroll
- Shangri-La Frontier Season 3 - Crunchyroll
- Spice and Wolf: Merchant Meets the Wise Wolf Season 2 - Crunchyroll
- SSS-Class Revival Hunter - Crunchyroll
- Though I Am an Inept Villainess Part 2 - Crunchyroll, Disney+, & Hulu
- The World's Finest Assassin Gets Reincarnated in Another World as an Aristocrat Season 2 - Crunchyroll
- Yaiba: Samurai Legend Season 2 - Hulu & Netflix

=== Spring ===
- The Apothecary Diaries Season 3, Part 2 - Crunchyroll
- Berserk of Gluttony Season 2 - Crunchyroll
- The Dangers in My Heart Season 3 - Hidive
- Eleceed - Crunchyroll
- Everyone's Darling Has a Secret - Crunchyroll
- Fate Rewinder - Crunchyroll
- Kagurabachi - Crunchyroll
- Laid-Back Camp Season 4 - Crunchyroll
- Romelia War Chronicle Part 2 - Crunchyroll
- Skip and Loafer Season 2 - Crunchyroll
- That Time I Got Reincarnated as a Slime: Clayman's Revenge - Crunchyroll
- The Vermilion Mask Part 2 - Crunchyroll

=== Summer ===
- That Time I Got Reincarnated as a Slime Season 4, Part 2 - Crunchyroll

=== Fall ===
- Delicious in Dungeon Season 2 - Netflix
- Frieren: Beyond Journey's End Season 3 - Crunchyroll
