= Jumondou =

Japanese animation studio

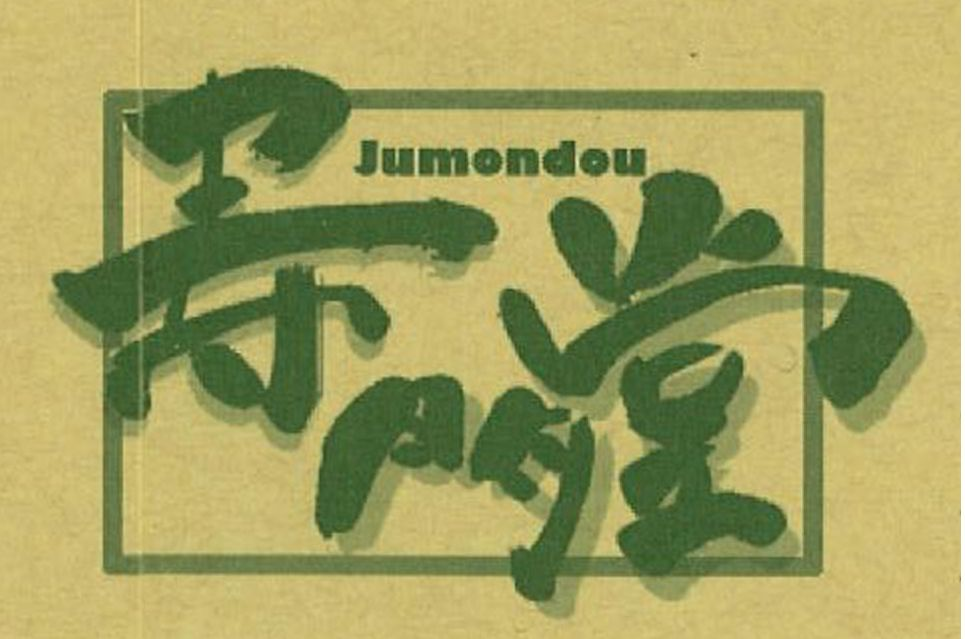
- Native name: 株式会社寿門堂
- Romanized name: Kabushiki-gaisha Jumondō
- Type: Kabushiki-gaisha
- Industry: Japanese animation
- Founded: December 2009; 16 years ago
- Headquarters: Higashiōizumi, Nerima, Tokyo (Note: Headquarters), Japan
- Number of locations: Yahatacho, Musashino, Tokyo (Note: Studio), Japan
- Key people: Seiji Misaki; Kōji Sugimoto
- Total equity: ¥9,500,000
- Number of employees: 86 (As of December 2020)
- Website: jumondou.com

Jumondou (Japanese: 株式会社寿門堂, Hepburn: Kabushiki-gaisha Jumondō) is a Japanese animation studio based in Nerima, Tokyo founded in 2009.

== Works ==
=== Television series ===
Title	Director(s)	First run start date	First run end date	Eps	Note(s)	Ref(s)
Don't Hurt Me, My Healer!	Nobuaki Nakanishi	April 10, 2022	June 26, 2022	12	Based on a manga by Tannen ni Hakkō.	
I Shall Survive Using Potions!	Nobuaki Nakanishi	October 8, 2023	December 24, 2023	12	Based on a light novel by FUNA.	
Villainess Level 99	Minoru Yamaoka	January 9, 2024	March 26, 2024	12	Based on a light novel by Satori Tanabata.	
Harmony of Mille-Feuille	Kiyoto Nakajima; Takuya Satō	July 17, 2025	September 18, 2025	10	Original work. A mixed media project by Pony Canyon and Takuya Yamanaka.	
The Warrior Princess and the Barbaric King	Takayuki Tanaka	April 9, 2026	June 25, 2026	12	Based on a manga by Noriaki Kotoba.	
Even Though I'm a Super Timid Noble Girl, I Accepted the Bet from My Cunning Fiancé	Nobuaki Nakanishi	October 4, 2026	TBA	TBA	Based on a light novel by Hiro Oda.	
The One. Later On...	Koichi Ohata; Seung Deok Kim	2027	TBA	TBA	Based on a light novel by NAHAaTO.	
