= I Shall Survive Using Potions! =

Japanese light novel series and its adaptations

- Cover of the first light novel volume

ポーション頼みで生き延びます！ (Pōshon-danomi de Ikinobimasu!)
- Genre: Isekai
- Novel series
- Written by: FUNA
- Published by: Shōsetsuka ni Narō
- Original run: November 3, 2015 – present
- Light novel
- Written by: FUNA
- Illustrated by: Sukima
- Published by: Kodansha
- English publisher: NA: J-Novel Club
- Imprint: Kodansha Ranobe Books
- Original run: June 1, 2017 – present
- Volumes: 12
- Manga
- Written by: FUNA
- Illustrated by: Hibiki Kokonoe
- Published by: Kodansha
- English publisher: NA: J-Novel Club
- Magazine: Suiyōbi no Sirius
- Original run: June 7, 2017 – November 15, 2021
- Volumes: 9
- Manga

I Shall Survive Using Potions! Continuation
- Written by: FUNA
- Illustrated by: Futsū Onshin
- Published by: Kodansha
- Magazine: Suiyōbi no Sirius
- Original run: August 1, 2022 – present
- Volumes: 5
- Manga

I Shall Survive Using Potions! Hanano and Lotte's Journey
- Written by: FUNA
- Illustrated by: Sukima
- Published by: Kodansha
- Magazine: Suiyōbi no Sirius
- Original run: January 30, 2023 – present
- Volumes: 1
- Anime television series
- Directed by: Nobuaki Nakanishi
- Written by: Takayo Ikami
- Music by: Hiroaki Tsutsumi
- Studio: Jumondou
- Licensed by: Crunchyroll
- Original network: ANN (ABC, TV Asahi); BS Fuji, AT-X
- Original run: October 8, 2023 – December 24, 2023
- Episodes: 12
- icon

I Shall Survive Using Potions! (Japanese: ポーション頼みで生き延びます！, Hepburn: Pōshon-danomi de Ikinobimasu!) is a Japanese light novel series written by FUNA. The series originated on the Shōsetsuka ni Narō website, before being published in print with illustrations by Sukima by Kodansha beginning in June 2017. As of March 2026, twelve volumes have been released. A manga adaptation, illustrated by Hibiki Kokonoe, was serialized on the Niconico-based Suiyōbi no Sirius platform in June 2017 to November 2021, with its individual chapters collected into nine volumes. A sequel manga, illustrated by Futsū Onshin, began serialization on the same platform in August 2022. As of July 2026, the manga's individual chapters have been collected into five volumes. An anime television series produced by Jumondou, aired from October to December 2023.

== Premise ==
Kaoru Nagase dies due to a dimensional energy rift between worlds, though the God of her world saves her soul and mind; giving her a new life in Reverie, a world under goddess Celestine's jurisdiction. Kaoru asks for the power to create potions and other skills; though she most notably asks for Celestine's friendship, to avoid loneliness.

== Characters ==
Kaoru Nagase (長瀬 香, Nagase Kaoru) / Kaoru (カオル)
Voiced by: Rin Kusumi (Japanese); Katie Wetch (English)
Kaoru died young and was offered the chance to be reborn with a special power; having chosen to create potions along with an item box that can hold an infinite number of objects. She asks to befriend the goddess of her new world, Celestine, unintentionally becoming an ageless immortal, due to asking to be friends "for life". Her greatest desire is to fall in love with an average man and spread out her descendants in the world. She is a skilled tactician and deceiver, using clever planning to outsmart her opponents. Due to her friendship with Celestine, many believe she is a goddess or an angel who works with her.
Kaoru ends up causing major uproar in the world by voicing her opinion on nobility and the rich, and how their lives are a shame; it is mostly because she doesn't want to be used for personal gain or greedy desires.
Francette (フランセット, Furansetto)
Voiced by: Tomoyo Takayanagi (Japanese); Marianne Bray (English)
Also known by her nickname Fran. A knight in originally her 30s; she was de-aged to her teen years thanks to a potion Kaoru gave her, having felt sorry Fran gave up her youth for knighthood. After being saved from death by Kaoru, she starts displaying a blood knight viciousness in battle. Since then, she has been obsessed with protecting Kaoru at all costs.
Emil (エミール, Emīru)
Voiced by: Moeka Koizumi (Japanese); Erica Muse (English)
Emil is the first orphan Kaoru met. She helped his group out and now Emil travels with her as one of Kaoru's bodyguards.
Belle (ベル, Beru)
Voiced by: Haruki Iwata (Japanese); Leo Matthews (English)
Belle is one of Kaoru's bodyguards. She is also dating Emil.
Reyette (レイエット, Reietto)
Voiced by: Natsuki Kitagawa (Japanese); Morgan Lea (English)
An orphan Kaoru helped save from kidnappers. Having no family due to her parents willingly giving her away, she became Kaoru's foster sister.
When Kaoru got trapped in her item box for 60 years, Reyette had a family of her own. Though she was happy to see Kaoru again, once Celes let her out.
Celestine (セレスティーヌ, Seresutīnu)
Voiced by: Nao Tōyama (Japanese); Monét Lerner (English)
Celestine is the Goddess of Kaoru's current world, and admirer of Earth's God. She also goes by her nickname Celes. Celestine has some troubles of her own. A "holy" nation founded itself under the delusion she blessed them; when the founders actually just bothered her, while she was fixing reality. She usually drops wooden buckets on Kaoru when she accidentally insults her.
She has a bad habit of not restraining her anger when someone in Verne upsets Celestine. When a past nation did so, several nearby nations suffered collateral damage.
Roland (ロランド, Rorando)
Voiced by: Taito Ban
The prince of Balmore Kingdom. He is Francette's fiancé and Serge's brother. Originally, he was meant for the throne but he was made ineligible thanks to his arm being rendered crippled. It was healed thanks to Kaoru, but he decided against taking the throne as he saw what a headache it is.
Serge
The king of the royal capital and Roland's brother. Unlike the royalty of the Brancott kingdom, Serge is wise and cautious about dealing with Kaoru. Not only is Kaoru clever, but she invoked the Goddess's name to avoid being summoned to the castle ever.
Fernand (フェルナン, Ferunan)
Voiced by: Ryuichi Kijima (Japanese); Branden Loera (English)
The prince of Brancott Kingdom. He originally met Kaoru when she gave advice out at the restaurant she waitresses at. Fernand fell in love with Kaoru for her brilliance, wishing to marry her, not even taking into consideration her opinion. Kaoru bluntly tells him that she detests the idea of being a high ranking noble, let alone royalty, and ran away. Unable to take the hint, Fernand remains obsessed with finding and marrying her, wasting his life. However, he is also tricked into thinking that Kaoru had a twin sister.
Allan (アラン, Aran)
Voiced by: Takeo Ōtsuka
Fernand's childhood friend. He and Fabio are exasperated with the prince for taking them on a wild goose chase.
Fabio (ファビオ)
Voiced by: Masaya Wada
Fernand's childhood friend. He and Allan were able to understand Kaoru's wishes; however, they can't stop Fernand due to his status.
Administrator of Earth (地球の管理者, Chikyū no Kanrisha)
Voiced by: Takuya Satō (Japanese); Aaron Dismuke (English)
Also known as the God of Earth. He is well known among the administrators for being good at his job. Celeste is known to desire his praise for a job well done. It was he who accidentally killed Kaoru and as an apology, he allowed her to be revived in Celes' world.
Renie
Voiced by: (Japanese); Michael Stimac (English)
A greedy baron who tried to use Kaoru's potions for his own gain, but she escaped and stole some of his possessions. He sent men after her, but they double-cross him and allow her to escape as they are good friends with Kaoru.
Gilda
Voiced by: (Japanese); Sara Ragsdale (English)
The owner of a hunter's guild.
Hannah
A maid who works for Renie. Kaoru stole her clothes and impersonated her to escape Renie's clutches. As an apology, Kaoru sent a potion back with her maid uniform; said potion made Hannah incredibly beautiful. As a result, a merchant fell in love with Hannah and they got married.
Hector and Eunice
Voiced by: (Japanese); Ezra Vervin (English)
Voiced by: (Japanese); Kara Edwards (English)
Count Adan's children. They met Kaoru along with Fran and she helped them by giving them a healing potion for their sick grandmother.
Count Adan
Hector and Eunice's father.
Charles
Voiced by: (Japanese); Dusty Feeney (English)
A young boy who gave Kaoru a ride to the royal capital. He is Bowman's son.
Bowman
Charles's father, who gave Kaoru a ride to the royal capital.
Eme and Agathe
Two young waitresses whom Kaoru befriends.
Alemen
Voiced by: (Japanese); Drew Breedlove (English)
A viscount who was sent by Fernand to deliver an invitation and a package to Kaoru to make her come to a party at the castle, but she gets him in trouble when she tricks Fernand into thinking Alemen made a mistake with the delivery.
Johan Abilly
A company owner and Amelie's father.
Amelie
Johan's daughter. She had a terrible illness, but Kaoru helped to cure her.
Lolotte
An orphan girl and one of Emil and Belle's friends. She currently works at the Meyer Workshop. Asil has feelings for her.
Lucy
An orphan girl and one of Emil and Belle's friends. She now runs the house that the other orphan kids are living in.
Asil
Voiced by: (Japanese); Dakota Jaymes (English)
Leotar's son. He requested Kaoru to help pretend to be his fiancée as he did not want to be married just yet. He has feelings for Lolotte.
Cedric
Asil's older brother and Leotar's eldest son.
Leotar
A viscount and Asil and Cedric's father.
Calvin
Cedric's servant. He originally had a disabled leg, but Kaoru helped healed him.
Ed
A horse who served as Kaoru's means of transportation after she healed his leg. Kaoru can understand him and she usually calls him "Silver".
Literisa and Salle
Two girls who were captured by kidnappers along with Reyette and Kaoru. After Kaoru defeats the kidnappers, they were reunited with their mothers.
Gum
An orphan boy who works for Kaoru after she opens a drugstore.
Mal and Mol
Two of Gum's friends. They also work for Kaoru after she opened a drugstore.
Olam
A greedy count who tried to take Kaoru's drugstore for his own, but she outfoxes him and he is forced to leave her alone.
Sevos von Larsrick
Voiced by: (Japanese); Landon McDonald (English)
A lord who asked Kaoru to help find treasure hidden in his mansion.
Vonsas
A colonial who once aided Kaoru with stopping an epidemic.
Kyoko and Reiko
Voiced by: (Japanese); Monica Flatley (English)
Voiced by: (Japanese); Abigail Blythe (English)
Two of Kaoru's friends from her old life. Upon learning of Kaoru's accidental death, they spoke to her spirit and accepted her new life in Verny.

== Media ==
=== Light novel ===
Written by FUNA, the series began serialization on the novel posting website Shōsetsuka ni Narō on November 3, 2015. The series was later acquired by Kodansha, who began publishing the series in print with illustrations by Sukima on June 1, 2017. As of April 2025, eleven volumes have been released.

In December 2018, J-Novel Club announced that they licensed the novels for English publication.

==== Volumes ====
No.	Original release date	Original ISBN	English release date	English ISBN
1	June 1, 2017	978-4-06-365022-8	February 10, 2019 (digital); August 4, 2020 (print)	978-1-71-833500-4 (digital); 978-1-71-837190-3 (print)
2	November 1, 2017	978-4-06-365044-0	May 11, 2019 (digital); October 6, 2020 (print)	978-1-71-833502-8 (digital); 978-1-71-837191-0 (print)
3	May 2, 2018	978-4-06-511505-3	July 23, 2019 (digital); December 1, 2020 (print)	978-1-71-833504-2 (digital); 978-1-71-837192-7 (print)
4	January 9, 2019	978-4-06-514538-8	March 30, 2020 (digital); March 2, 2021 (print)	978-1-71-833506-6 (digital); 978-1-71-837193-4 (print)
5	October 3, 2019	978-4-06-517389-3	October 10, 2020 (digital); May 4, 2021 (print)	978-1-71-833508-0 (digital); 978-1-71-837194-1 (print)
6	June 2, 2020	978-4-06-519782-0	March 1, 2021 (digital); October 26, 2021 (print)	978-1-71-833510-3 (digital); 978-1-71-837195-8 (print)
7	February 2, 2021	978-4-06-521869-3	August 2, 2021 (digital); April 5, 2022 (print)	978-1-71-833512-7 (digital); 978-1-71-837196-5 (print)
8	August 2, 2022	978-4-06-528815-3	February 20, 2023 (digital); November 13, 2023 (print)	978-1-71-833514-1 (digital); 978-1-71-837197-2 (print)
9	March 2, 2023	978-4-06-531305-3	January 23, 2024 (digital); January 14, 2025 (print)	978-1-71-833516-5 (digital); 978-1-71-837198-9 (print)
10	December 1, 2023	978-4-06-534121-6	March 13, 2025 (digital); January 13, 2026 (print)	978-1-71-833518-9 (digital); 978-1-71-837199-6 (print)
11	April 2, 2025	978-4-06-539305-5	September 21, 2025 (digital); July 14, 2026 (print)	978-1-71-833520-2 (digital); 978-1-71-837200-9 (print)
12	March 2, 2026	978-4-06-543082-8	—	—

=== Manga ===
A manga adaptation, illustrated by Hibiki Kokonoe, was serialized on the Niconico-based Suiyōbi no Sirius platform from June 7, 2017, to November 15, 2021. Kodansha published the individual chapters in nine tankōbon volumes. A sequel to the manga adaptation illustrated by Futsū Onshin, titled I Shall Survive Using Potions! Continuation, began serialization on the same platform on August 1, 2022. As of July 2026, the series' individual chapters have been collected into five tankōbon volumes.

In December 2018, J-Novel Club announced that they also licensed the manga adaptation for English publication.

A spin-off manga also illustrated by Sukima, titled I Shall Survive Using Potions! Hanano and Lotte's Journey, also began serialization on Suiyōbi no Sirius on January 30, 2023. As of February 2025, the series' individual chapters have been collected into two tankōbon volumes.

==== Volumes ====
===== First series =====
No.	Original release date	Original ISBN	English release date	English ISBN
1	November 2, 2017	978-4-06-510332-6	June 25, 2019	978-1-71-834000-8
2	May 9, 2018	978-4-06-511384-4	December 11, 2019	978-1-71-834002-2
3	January 9, 2019	978-4-06-514072-7	August 5, 2020	978-1-71-834004-6
4	May 9, 2019	978-4-06-515414-4	February 3, 2021	978-1-71-834006-0
5	December 4, 2019	978-4-06-517790-7	March 31, 2021	978-1-71-834008-4
6	June 9, 2020	978-4-06-519704-2	August 4, 2021	978-1-71-834010-7
7	December 9, 2020	978-4-06-521727-6	October 5, 2021	978-1-71-837236-8
8	June 9, 2021	978-4-06-523657-4	March 18, 2022	978-1-71-834014-5
9	December 9, 2021	978-4-06-526032-6	June 1, 2022	978-1-71-834016-9

===== Second series =====
No.	Release date	ISBN
1	March 9, 2023	978-4-06-530965-0
2	November 9, 2023	978-4-06-533528-4
3	October 8, 2024	978-4-06-537081-0
4	July 9, 2025	978-4-06-539871-5
5	July 9, 2026	978-4-06-543709-4

==== Hanano and Lotte's Journey ====
No.	Release date	ISBN
1	October 6, 2023	978-4-06-533381-5
2	February 7, 2025	978-4-06-537453-5

=== Anime ===
An anime television series adaptation was announced on February 24, 2023. It is produced by Jumondou and directed by Nobuaki Nakanishi, with scripts written by Takayo Ikami, character designs handled by Chisato Kikunaga, and music composed by Hiroaki Tsutsumi. The series aired from October 8 to December 24, 2023, on the Animazing!!! programming block on all ANN affiliates, including ABC and TV Asahi, as well as other networks. The opening theme song is "Tailwind" by Katagiri, while the ending theme song is "Love Is a Potion" by Harmoe. Crunchyroll licensed the series outside of Asia.

==== Episodes ====
No.	Title	Original release date
1	"Perks of Reincarnation, Please!"; Transliteration: "Tensei Tokuten de Onegaishimasu!" (Japanese: 転生特典でお願いします！)	October 8, 2023
After finishing work, Kaoru leaves to meet up with her friends. She suddenly dies under mysterious circumstances and finds herself in a strange realm where she is being apologized by God. He was busy sealing a distortion, rifts that form in the boundaries between worlds, and accidentally killed her while doing this. Because she cannot be revived in her old world, God decides to revive her in another world. After her spirit says goodbye to her friends and family, who accept her fate, she meets Celestine (or Celes for short), the goddess of Verny, the new world that Kaoru will be reborn in. Kaoru is revived in a younger body along with the ability to create potions at her request. She is also given an item box that has an infinite amount of space. In this new world, Kaoru discovers that she can understand animals and after testing her potions, she heads to a nearby town. Visiting a hunter's guild, she convinces the owner to let her stay for the night and shows off her potions, but the hunters aren't interested and she instead does jobs for them. When a hunter comes back injured, Kaoru realizes that the people in this world don't know magic and uses her potions to heal him. The hunters believe she is an angel and come to respect her. The next day, Kaoru is bought to a baron by his subordinate, who secretly plans to use her potions for his own gain. After tricking the baron into getting his subordinate in trouble using her wristwatch, she knocks out a maid named Hannah, steals her clothes and bedroom furniture, and escapes in disguise. The baron learns of her escape and sends some hunters to catch her, but she had changed her appearance to conceal herself. Luckily, the hunters that the baron hired double-cross him and willingly let her escape as they still respect her. Later in the woods, two siblings, who are accompanied by a knight named Francette (or Fran for short), find Kaoru asleep in the bed that she stole from the baron.
2	"My Goal Is a Safe, Worry-Free Life in Another World!"; Transliteration: "Isekai de Anshin Anzen Seikatsu Mezashimasu!" (Japanese: 異世界で安心安全生活目指します！)	October 15, 2023
The siblings and Fran wake up Kaoru, believing that she's Celes. After explaining that she isn't and is a friend of hers, they believe that she is a goddess from another world. Upon learning that the siblings are visiting their ill grandmother, they request for Kaoru for help. She agrees if they can make her cry. The siblings' sad stories do not work, but Fran reveals that her career as a knight to avoid being looked down on left her unable to get married; this causes Kaoru to shred tears and create healing potions. After the siblings' grandmother is cured, they and Fran tell the king about Kaoru. Fran proves her existence by drinking one of her potions, turning her young again. She also gives a potion to the king's brother Roland, who has a disabled arm. After his arm is healed, Roland decides to not be king anymore and have a more easier life. Kaoru arrives at the royal capital and sells things that she stole from the baron to a merchant after convincing him that they are not stolen products. She then gets a job at a restaurant and befriends the young waitresses there. A prince named Fernand visits the restaurant with his friends and after enjoying the foods there, Fernand takes an interest in Kaoru after listening to her skilled knowledge. He decides to marry her, even though she's too young for him. He visits the restaurant again, but constantly fails to woo her and ends up getting in trouble for it when he tries to take her by force, and is forced to leave to avoid consequences. The next day, Kaoru is given a letter from the castle and a package, inviting her to an upcoming party.
3	"I'm Gonna Go Speak My Mind at the Castle!"; Transliteration: "Ōkyū de Iitaihōdai Shite Jimasu!" (Japanese: 王宮で言いたい放題してきます！)	October 22, 2023
Wearing a ball gown, Kaoru attends a party at the castle. She also plans to leave town due to Fernand being obsessed with her and says goodbye to the restaurant's owner and waitresses. The party is meant for the prince to decide which groom he wants to marry, but Kaoru, aware of this, disguises herself as a maid. Fernand is desperately looking for Kaoru and after learning that she is dressed as a maid, goes to talk to her. It is revealed that the package that she received contained clothes for the party, but Kaoru lies to them that the box was accidentally sent to the building next door, causing Fernand to become furious with the viscount for his apparent mistake before officially choosing Kaoru as his groom, but she declines as she claims that being married to a noble would come with terrible costs for her before leaving. She bribes a guard into helping her escape by pretending that she's being chased by bad people. After declining an offer to work at a company following a ride out of the kingdom, she gets a job at an unpopular workshop, but she is able to use her potions and tactics to improve it, including developing the idea of selling perfume bottles. While shopping, a young orphan boy name Emil pickpockets her, but the money bag that he stole was a decoy trap. Kaoru later helps Emil cure a sick girl's mother while in disguise and reveals to have founded the Eyes of the Goddess, a group of orphans who help provide her with information around the area.
4	"I'm Going into Angel Mode to Fight Back!"; Transliteration: "Gotsukaiyō Mōde de Hangeki Shimasu!" (Japanese: 御使い様モードで反撃します！)	October 29, 2023
Johan Abilly, the company owner who gave Kaoru a ride out of the kingdom earlier, prays for his ill daughter Amelie's recovery. Kaoru arrives to help and cures Amelie. A flashback reveal that Emil was stealing to cure his sick friend Belle and Kaoru helps to cure her and recruits them and the other orphans to form the Eyes of the Goddess. A noble named Asil request for Kaoru to act as his fiancée due to him not wanting to be married yet at an upcoming party. She agrees and at the party, she meets Asil's older brother Cedric and demonstrates her power by curing his servant Calvin's disabled leg before leaving. Meanwhile, at a holy temple where Celes is worshiped in a neutral holy land, the priests learn about Kaoru, whom they believe is an angel who has connections with Celes, and attempt to recruit her. Kaoru reveals the truth about herself to Asil, but she is then invited to the castle. Not wanting to visit, she disguises herself as a commoner so she will be denied entry and so the king cannot summon her again. She also declines an invitation to the temple and destroys the messenger's carriage to discourage them from trying to force her, leading the royals and the priests to fight for her. Kaoru then arranges a meeting with both groups and reveals the truth about her motives and identity, and gets a wooden bucket dropped on her by Celes when she mocks her as part of her ploy.
5	"I'll Use the Goddess's Potions to Do Business!"; Transliteration: "Megami no Pōshon de Shōbai Shimasu!" (Japanese: 女神のポーションで商売します！)	November 5, 2023
Now finally left alone, Kaoru can finally enjoy a peaceful life while helping people with her potions. She meets Fran again, who has now become younger as a result of the potion she gave her earlier. She later introduces Kaoru to Roland. Kaoru decides to form a secret organization with them, Count Aden, Johan, and the Eyes of the Goddess to sell healing potions that will only last for five days while keeping Kaoru's true identity concealed. After learning that Fernand has come to see her alongside his friends in another attempt to win her over, she tricks them into thinking that she is actually Kaoru's sister so she can prevent them from taking her back. The workers also forbid Fernand from taking Kaoru, forcing them to leave empty-handed. Despite this failure, Fernand still vows to make Kaoru his wife. Meanwhile, back at the holy land, the head priest is upset that they couldn't get Kaoru to come to them. Kaoru's business is going well as more healing potions are being sold. At a military kingdom, the leaders plan to capture Kaoru so they can use her for their own means. Kaoru later provides the orphans a new home and helps create food for the villagers. After curing a sick girl while hiding her identity, she is given flowers by the girl, who knows who she is. The king learns that the military kingdom is sending an imperial army their way along with priests from the holy land. When some of the priests come to take Kaoru, she manages to discourage them from doing so as she knows that they are in league with the military kingdom, resulting in their arrest. Kaoru then decides to deal with the army.
6	"I'll Use My Cheat to Destroy an Army!"; Transliteration: "Chīto de Guntai Tsubushi ni Ikimasu!" (Japanese: チートで軍隊潰しに行きます！)	November 12, 2023 (Note: This episode aired at 2:30 a.m. JST, 30 minutes after the original air time on All-Nippon News Network.)
As Kaoru prepares to fight the approaching imperial army, the orphans want to go with her despite how dangerous it is and they meet up with Roland and Fran, who are surprised that Kaoru brought kids while Roland and Fran brought royals to help. During their travels, they reach several villages and help sick and injured villagers. Fran discovers the imperial army and reveals the powerful skills that she got from Kaoru's potions. Kaoru begins her attack by ordering the royals and orphans to take out the imperial army's food supplies. Next, she poisons the village wells to weaken the imperial soldiers, but a boy named Tapani reveals that the soldiers discovered a secret well. Kaoru confronts them with Emil and Belle, who sacrifices herself to poison the well by jumping into it, but Kaoru saves her by transporting her into her item box at the last second. Kaoru then defeats the soldiers by making poison appear inside their bodies. After defeating the rest of the soldiers, Kaoru heals the leg of an imperial horse named Ed and he decides to serve as her means of transportation. Meanwhile, the remaining enemy soldiers and priests are weakening. Kaoru sends the orphans home for their own safety as the others prepare for their fight against the enemy. The next day, the battle begins as Roland leads a squadron against the enemy soldiers, but they instead target Kaoru. Fran and Roland come to her rescue, but Fran is stabbed by one of the soldiers.
7	"The Goddess Descends to End the War!"; Transliteration: "Megami Kōrin de Sensō Shūketsu Sasemasu!" (Japanese: 女神降臨で戦争終結させます！)	November 19, 2023
An angered Kaoru heals Fran and gifts her with a powerful sword. She also gives additional swords to Roland and his men to use until the battle is over. The sword grants Fran immense power, allowing her to easily defeat the soldiers. Kaoru also releases explosions to scare the enemy into retreating. Afterwards, Fran swears loyalty to Kaoru and she arranges a meeting between the kingdom, the imperial army, and the holy land. After Kaoru explains her true nature and motivations, she suggests that the countries should start a trading business. Both the kingdom and the imperial army agree, but the holy land refuses. Believing that Kaoru is actually a servant of the devil in disguise, the head priest summons Celes using a crystal ball that she left behind in their country in hopes that she can deal with Kaoru, but this backfires when she reveals that she and Kaoru truly are friends and that the crystal ball was left in a place where a distortion once was. Celes is angered that she was summoned for a personal gain, revealing that she once destroyed a whole country in retaliation and forbids anyone from doing this again as she has not granted her blessing to anybody. As a result, the priests are arrested as the holy land collapses. A new trading ship is built four years later, with its figurehead resembling Kaoru. The orphans have all grown up and gotten jobs, Fran and Roland are married, but Kaoru has not aged one bit as a result of her being an ageless immortal thanks to Celes. Wanting a husband too, Kaoru decides to leave to a new place, meaning that the kingdom will have to survive without potions from now on, which won't be a problem for them. Kaoru is accompanied by Fran, Roland, Emil, Belle, and Ed. Fernand again makes another attempt to win Fran's heart, but again fails when he can't find her and ends up thinking that he is after Kaoru's sister again. He again refuses to give up, but Kaoru senses this. Meanwhile, Celes is preparing to see God.
8	"I'm Seen as a Beautiful Girl and Abducted!"; Transliteration: "Bishōjo Nintei de Yūkai Saremasu!" (Japanese: 美少女認定で誘拐されます！)	November 26, 2023
Having moved to a new country, Kaoru's group decide to stay in an inn for the night, though Kaoru ends up sleeping alone. At one point, she is captured by a group of criminals and locked in a cell with three other young girls; they are a group of kidnappers who sell young girls into slavery. Her party wonder where she is and, sensing something is off, go to find her. Deciding to put an escape plan in motion, Kaoru plays clever antics with the other girls to make the guards leave one by one. She also befriends Reyette, one of the girls, and helps remove her pain. As they are about to be taken out of town, Kaoru discovers that some of the kingdom guards are in league with the criminals, but she nevertheless defeats them using pepper spray with the help of the other girls. This gets the attention of her group. Kaoru reveals the kidnappers' motives to the knights' captain and that some of his men are helping them. She also lies to everyone that it was Celes who stopped them and that the kingdom will be destroyed if the criminals are not punished. In response, the kingdom's ruler has the kidnappers arrested while Kaoru also leads the soldiers to their hideout. Two of the girls are reunited with their mothers, but Reyette is orphaned as her parents willingly sold her off. Kaoru decides to adapt Reyette as her little sister so she won't feel so lonely. While leaving the kingdom, Fran asks why Kaoru used Celes as a front and she replies that it is to avoid anymore conflicts between nations with her as the target. Kaoru also requests for Ed to pull a carriage that she made for herself and Reyette. He refuses at first, but upon seeing how beautiful it is (which also comes with characteristics of a car), he reconsiders. Meanwhile, Celes tells God of how Kaoru has been doing, revealing that the maid that she impersonated while escaping the baron's mansion and the guard that she bribed into helping her escape from Fernand had bright futures. In another part of Verny, a distortion is happening.
9	"I'm Going to Relax in a Hot Spring for a While!"; Transliteration: "Onsen de Chotto Honeyasume Shitekimasu!" (Japanese: 温泉でちょっと骨休めしてきます！)	December 3, 2023
Kaoru decides to stop and look for a hot spring to rest in for a while. Johan directs them to where one of the hot springs is, while also warning them of thieves in that area. Using a nose-like device, Kaoru finds the hot spring and the girls all enjoy a bath there while the boys have to stay several distances away to prevent peeping. They then have a talk about romantic relationships and their future. The boys catch some men nearby and they tell the group about a village that they live in, inviting them to visit; however, their behavior makes them suspicious, but Kaoru accepts as she is looking forward for a challenge. After being offered food by the village chief, Kaoru begins to wonder their true intentions after he considers them part of their village now while also talking about the thieves threatening them. Realizing that the villagers only want to use them, the group decide to leave, but the chief finally confesses that they just needed help to deal with the thieves since the lord may be of no help to them. Kaoru agrees to help and she convinces the villagers to join the fight. Fran trains the villagers to fight while the others prepare traps for the thieves. As the thieves arrive, Kaoru begins her attack plan. After taking out all except the leader, Fran joins in and forces the leader to surrender. Kaoru has the villagers turn the thieves in so that they can get a reward. As Kaoru's group make their return to the hot springs, one of the boys from the village wants Fran to train him, but she convinces him to not give up his career as a farmer. While the girls are enjoying another bath, Kaoru gets the idea to open a potion shop, but after discovering that the boys are watching them from hiding, they are angered by their perverted actions.
10	"Going Back to my Original Goal in a New Country!"; Transliteration: "Aratana Kuni de Shoshin ni Kaerimasu!" (Japanese: 新たな国で初心に返ります！)	December 10, 2023
Kaoru opens a new drugstore in another kingdom, which she has named after Reyette. The visitors take a great interest in her products, especially the kingdom soldiers. Roland, Fran, Emil, and Belle are also hired to serve as guards for her shop, all while acting like they do not know her to avoid unwanted attention. An orphan boy named Gum helps Kaoru at one point and he and his friends are given lots of food as a reward by Belle and Emil, who share their backstory with Kaoru. A soldier commander arrives to buy potions from Kaoru for his men and makes a deal with her. Gum is later hired to work at Kaoru's shop after being inspired by Belle and Emil. After bringing the commander his order, she and Reyette take a tour of the facility and she discovers that she can read and understand any kind of language. She later discovers that the soldiers didn't get any of the potions she gave them, leading her to realize that the commander tricked her. Count Olam, who claims to be the landlord of her shop, arrives and attempts to gain ownership of her property so he can get her potions, but she agrees as part of her ploy to prevent this from happening. She replaces her drugstore shop with a lunch shop and has Emil and Belle be the owners to foil Olam's plan, but he discovers that she had moved her shop to a different location so to reveal his true nature. He is forced to give Kaoru her shop back to avoid the spread of bad rumors about him. After learning that the lunch shop is all out and there are lots of orders still needed, Kaoru decides to complete these orders with Roland and Fran's help. She also decides to modify her shop to sell both potions and lunches. Meanwhile, a rat with glowing red eyes has entered the city.
11	"I'll Find a Husband with a Treasure Hunt!"; Transliteration: "Otakara Hanto de o Muko san Mitsukemasu!" (Japanese: お宝ハントでお婿さん見つけます！)	December 17, 2023 (Note: This episode aired at 2:15 a.m. JST, 15 minutes after the original air time on All-Nippon News Network.)
The next morning, Reyette and Belle wake Kaoru up with a reminder that they have prepare some lunch orders, as the customers as more interested in the lunches than potions. This proves to be a frustration for Kaoru as she made the recipes herself and her shop now also sells bath products and glass containers. Kaoru and Reyette leave to deliver some potions to the soldiers along with Gum and his friends while Fran follows them to protect Kaoru. After the order is completed, the orphans receive their payment and leave while Kaoru and Reyette visit the commander and learns that he sold the earlier order illegally. The commander is shocked that she can read the document's languages, leading Kaoru to discover that Celes also granted her this ability. She is forced to make a decent excuse to avoid suspicion, leading the commander to invite her to join the army, but she manages to avoid this. Another commander comes to her shop to invite her and Reyette to his home, revealing himself to be the kingdom's lord when his home is actually a mansion and introducing himself as Sevos von Larsrick. He asks her to find a treasure hidden in his home, revealing that his land is falling into disarray and needs it to restore it. She reluctantly agrees and after reading a message that tells the treasure's whereabouts, she is unable to translate it as it does not seem helpful and instead resorts to using a metal detector to find it. Their search leads them to the treasury's safe and the inside of its walls, but they find nothing. After healing Reyette's bug bite, she realizes that the area behind the wall's inside contains the gold; the entire treasury is the treasure. She then gives him advice on what to do with it. During a meal, she falls in love with one of the lord's sons, but they are only interested in her medicines. While preparing to go to bed, Kaoru is called over by Gum to help two of his friends Mal and Mol. Soon, Gum and other people in the kingdom begin experiencing the same disease, which Kaoru deducts is not normal.
12	"I Shall Survive Using Potions!"; Transliteration: "Pōshon-danomi de Ikinobimasu!" (Japanese: ポーション頼みで生き延びます！)	December 24, 2023
With the epidemic worsening, leading people to slowly die, Kaoru arranges a meeting with her party and the commander to resolve this. Gum and the other orphans have received potions that render them immune to the epidemic. Kaoru decides to find the source of this epidemic, revealing her true nature to the commander. She has the orphans and her group bring everyone in the kingdom to her so she can cure everyone and make them immune to the epidemic. She also summons a statue of Celes that pours an endless amount of healing potion to cure the townsfolks. She also gives some of her potions to Larsrick to give to the king and his family. When a greedy lord tries to take her potions for himself, she violently discourages him from trying, but makes another potion statue to help. Kaoru also plans to travel east when this is over, with the commander accompanying her. In another nearby village, she provides healing potions to the villagers there to allow recovery. The village chief shows them a hint on where the epidemic's source is coming from, leading to a foggy area where Kaoru uses some hi-tech glasses to help find their way, where they also discover red-eyed animals infected by the epidemic. The group find the distortion, the main source of the epidemic, from earlier and Kaoru summons Celes. Seeing that this is a real emergency, Celes have everyone keep back as she eliminates the distortion, almost hitting Kaoru in the process. Fran lectures Celes for almost hurting Kaoru, but she stops her and explains to Celes what has happened as a result of the distortion. After Celes leaves, Kaoru prepares to continue her journey, but also makes the potion statues that she made disappear should someone try to move them while also ensuring that no one will suffer from this illness again. The group then talk about what to do next as Kaoru vows to survive using her potions.

== Reception ==
Volumes of the manga adaptation have ranked on various bestseller charts, such as those published by BookLive! and Oricon.

=== Amazon removal ===
In July 2020, the series' light novel and manga adaptation were among several series temporarily removed from Amazon; Amazon stated that the affected series "did not fall within their global content guidelines."

== See also ==
- Didn't I Say to Make My Abilities Average in the Next Life?!, another light novel series by FUNA
- Saving 80,000 Gold in Another World for My Retirement, another light novel series by FUNA
