= Villainess Level 99 =

Japanese light novel series and its adaptations

- Villainess Level 99: I May Be the Hidden Boss but I'm Not the Demon Lord
- First light novel volume cover

悪役令嬢レベル99 ～私は裏ボスですが魔王ではありません～ (Akuyaku Reijou Reberu 99: Watashi wa Ura Bosudesuga Maou de wa Arimasen)
- Genre: Fantasy, Isekai
- Novel series
- Written by: Satori Tanabata
- Published by: Shōsetsuka ni Narō
- Original run: June 15, 2018 – present
- Light novel
- Written by: Satori Tanabata
- Illustrated by: Tea
- Published by: Fujimi Shobo
- English publisher: NA: J-Novel Club
- Imprint: Kadokawa Books
- Original run: May 10, 2019 – present
- Volumes: 6
- Manga
- Written by: Satori Tanabata
- Illustrated by: Nokomi
- Published by: Enterbrain
- English publisher: NA: One Peace Books
- Magazine: B's Log Comic
- Original run: February 5, 2020 – present
- Volumes: 6
- Anime television series
- Directed by: Minoru Yamaoka
- Written by: Fumihiko Shimo
- Music by: Kana Utatane
- Studio: Jumondou
- Licensed by: Crunchyroll; SEA: Plus Media Networks Asia
- Original network: Tokyo MX, MBS, BS11, AT-X
- English network: SEA: Aniplus Asia
- Original run: January 9, 2024 – March 26, 2024
- Episodes: 12
- icon

Villainess Level 99: I May Be the Hidden Boss but I'm Not the Demon Lord (Note: Japanese: 悪役令嬢レベル99 ～私は裏ボスですが魔王ではありません～, Hepburn: Akuyaku Reijou Reberu 99: Watashi wa Ura Bosudesuga Maou de wa Arimasen) is a Japanese light novel series written by Satori Tanabata with illustrations by Tea. It initially began serialization as a web novel published on the user-generated novel publishing site Shōsetsuka ni Narō in June 2018. It was then acquired by Fujimi Shobo who began to publish it as a light novel under their Kadokawa Books imprint in May 2019. A manga adaptation illustrated by Nokomi began serialization in Enterbrain's B's Log Comic magazine in February 2020. An anime television series adaptation produced by Jumondou aired from January to March 2024.

== Premise ==
Yumiella Dolkness was a college student who reincarnated into another world after dying in an accident. Unfortunately for her, she is now in a world where her dark hair and dark magic are reviled and feared by the country. Yumiella recognizes her new self as the secret boss of an otome RPG, Light Magic and the Hero, which she played before she died. Hoping for a peaceful life away from her absent family, she decides to level grind in order to survive, spending her childhood doing so. However, upon entering the country's academy at age fifteen, Yumiella discovers that she went overboard; Level 10 was the highest expected from students, but she maxed out at Level 99, making her the most powerful person in the country. With her plans turned upside-down, Yumiella must navigate everyone's wariness and the country's politics to find her place in the world and join the original game's heroes in defeating the Demon Lord, all while attempting to dispel the negative preconceptions regarding her dark hair and magic.

== Characters ==
=== Main characters ===
Yumiella Dolkness (ユミエラ・ドルクネス, Yumiera Dorukunesu)
Voiced by: Fairouz Ai (drama CD, voice comic, anime)
The main character. She was a Japanese college student who reincarnated as the secret boss of the otome game Light Magic and the Hero following the Demon Lord's defeat, possessing extremely powerful dark magic. She spent her childhood level-grinding, becoming level 99 in the process. Many students in her school are terrified of her.
Patrick Ashbatten (パトリック・アッシュバトン, Patorikku Asshubaton)
Voiced by: Yuma Uchida (drama CD, voice comic, anime)
The son of a lord on the frontier, who is talented at wind magic. He is a childhood friend of Prince Edwin. Patrick is the straight man in the story's comedy. Unlike most students, he doesn't fear Yumiella and has a crush on her.
Ryu
Yumiella's pet dragon, who was originally meant to be found by Alicia. Ryu considers Yumiella and Patrick his parents.
Alicia Ehnleit (アリシア・エンライト, Arishia Enraito)
Voiced by: Azumi Waki (drama CD, voice comic, anime)
The heroine of the game. She possesses a weak level of light magic, but Yumiella eventually helps her level up.
Eleonora Hillrose (エレノーラ・ヒルローズ, Erenōra Hirurōzu)
Voiced by: Rina Hidaka
The daughter of Duke Hillrose, the leader of the radical nobles. She is hopelessly in love with Prince Edwin. Like Patrick, she doesn't fear Yumiella.
Demon Lord
The game's final boss. He seeks revenge against the royal family for being sealed; but has no aspirations for world domination.

=== Capture targets ===
The original love interests of the otome game, who are antagonistic towards Yumiella, but they soon begin to warm up to her.

Edwin Valschein (エドウィン・バルシャイン, Edōwin Barushain)
Voiced by: Taku Yashiro (drama CD, voice comic, anime)
The second prince of the kingdom. He is a magic swordsman able to wield the four classical elements (fire, wind, earth, and water).
Oswald Grimsarde (オズワルド・グリムザード, Ozuwarudo Gurimuzādo)
Voiced by: Kōhei Amasaki (voice comic, anime)
A magic prodigy, able to wield the four classical elements even better than Edwin.
William Ares (ウィリアム・アレス, Wiriamu Aresu)
Voiced by: Haruki Ishiya (voice comic, anime)
A master swordsman.

=== Other characters ===
Duke Hillrose
The leader of a group of radical nobles who oppose the King. He is Eleonora's father.
Rita
A maid who works for Yumiella.
Sara
Rita's younger sister, who is held hostage by Count Dolkness to force Rita to poison Yumiella. Yumiella soon rescues her and hires her.
Ronald
The school principal, who took over on the King's orders after the Headmaster resigned. Unlike the Headmaster, he is supportive of Yumiella.
Jessica Monford
A student who once requested Yumiella's help in saving her town from a dragon.
Baron Monford
Jessica's father.
Linus
A spy from the Kingdom of Remlest who once tried to convince Yumiella to move to his kingdom.
Captain Adolf
A general who works for the King.
Count Dolkness
Yumiella's father. He despises his daughter.
Headmaster
The former unnamed school principal, who quit due to his fear of Yumiella.
King
The Kingdom's ruler and Edwin's father. Unlike his son, he is supportive of Yumiella and intends to use her to help in their fight against the Demon Lord.
Queen
The King's wife and Edwin's mother. She respects Yumiella's strength.

== Media ==
=== Light novel ===
Written by Satori Tanabata, the series began serialization as a web novel on the user-generated novel publishing website Shōsetsuka ni Narō on June 15, 2018. It was later acquired by Fujimi Shobo, which began publishing it as a light novel with illustrations by Tea under their Kadokawa Books imprint on May 10, 2019. It has been collected in six volumes as of January 2024. The series is licensed in English by J-Novel Club.

No.	Original release date	Original ISBN	English release date	English ISBN
1	May 10, 2019	978-4-04-073172-8	May 29, 2023	978-1-71-838062-2
Prologue; Chapter 1: "The Hidden Boss Enters the Academy"; Interlude 1: "The King"; Chapter 2: "The Hidden Boss Attends the Academy"; Interlude 2: "Jessica Montford"; Chapter 3: "The Hidden Boss Enters a Battle Arts Competition"; Interlude 3: "Eleonora Hillrose"; Chapter 4: "The Hidden Boss Meets a Dragon"; Interlude 4: "Patrick Ashbatten"; Chapter 5: "The Hidden Boss Enters a Dungeon"; Interlude 5: "Headmaster Roland"; Chapter 6: "The Hidden Boss Receives a Confession"; Chapter 7: "The Hidden Boss Faces the Demon Lord"; Epilogue
2	November 9, 2019	978-4-04-073379-1	September 11, 2023	978-1-71-838064-6
Prologue; Chapter 1: "The Hidden Boss Graduates"; Interlude 1: "The Duke of Hillrose"; Chapter 2: "The Hidden Boss Becomes a County Owner"; Interlude 2: "Daemon"; Chapter 3: "The Hidden Boss Visits Her Fiancé's Family"; Interlude 3: "Patrick"; Chapter 4: "The Hidden Boss Reforms Her County"; Interlude 4: "Cliff"; Chapter 5: "The Hidden Boss Heads to the Royal Capital"; Interlude 5: "Phil"; Chapter 6: "The Hidden Boss Gains a Friend"; Interlude 6: "Eleonora"; Chapter 7: "The Hidden Boss Faces Off Against the Duke"; Epilogue
3	May 9, 2020	978-4-04-073642-6	November 24, 2023	978-1-71-838066-0
Prologue; Chapter 1: "The Hidden Boss Meets the God of Darkness"; Interlude 1: "Lemn"; Chapter 2: "The Hidden Boss Is Attacked by the God of Light"; Interlude 2: "Sanon"; Chapter 3: "The Hidden Boss Reveals the Secret of Her Past Life"; Interlude 3: "Yumiella"; Chapter 4: "The Hidden Boss Beats Up the Hidden Boss"; Interlude 4: "Patrick"; Chapter 5: "The Hidden Boss Settles Things with the Hidden Boss"; Epilogue
4	April 9, 2021	978-4-04-073862-8	February 22, 2024	978-1-71-838068-4
Prologue; Chapter 1: "The Hidden Boss Assesses Her Level"; Chapter 2: "The Hidden Boss Shoots for the Moon"; Chapter 3: "The Hidden Boss Crashes into the Neighboring Kingdom"; Chapter 4: "The Hidden Boss Enjoys Sightseeing"; Interlude 1: "Alicia"; Chapter 5: "The Hidden Boss Reunites with the Secret Agent"; Interlude 2: "Patrick" (Part 1); Chapter 6: "The Hidden Boss Heads to the Battleground"; Interlude 3: "Patrick" (Part 2); Chapter 7: "The Hidden Boss Is Sealed Away"; Interlude 4: "Patrick" (Part 3); Chapter 8: "The Hidden Boss Descends – the End of the World"; Epilogue
5	June 10, 2022	978-4-04-074407-0	May 30, 2024	978-1-71-838070-7
Prologue; Chapter 1: "The Hidden Boss Carries Logs"; Chapter 2: "The Hidden Boss Gets Tricked"; Interlude 1: "Darren Archaim"; Chapter 3: "The Hidden Boss Visits the Count's House"; Interlude 2: "Dorothea"; Chapter 4: "The Hidden Boss Tails for a Trap"; Interlude 3: "Patrick"; Chapter 5: "The Hidden Boss Exposes the Kingdom's Dark Secret"; Interlude 4: "Marquess Pryman"; Chapter 6: "The Hidden Boss Gets Pampered by Her Parents"; Epilogue
6	January 10, 2024	978-4-04-075251-8	July 31, 2024	978-1-71-838072-1
Prologue; Chapter 1: "The Hidden Boss (Left Side) Awakens in the Kingdom of Twilight"; Chapter 2: "The Hidden Boss (Right Side) Awakens in the Room"; Chapter 3: "The Hidden Boss (Left Side) Reunites with the Demon Lord"; Chapter 4: "The Hidden Boss (Right Side) Finds a Black Notebook"; Chapter 5: "The Hidden Boss (Left Side) Learns the Truth about the Demon Lord"; Chapter 6: "The Hidden Boss (Right Side) Examines the Hero's Documents"; Chapter 7: "The Hidden Boss (Left Side) Fights the Hero"; Chapter 8: "The Hidden Boss (Right Side) Launches a Counterattack"; Chapter 9: "The Hidden Boss (Unknown) Sees the Two Off"; Epilogue; Side Story: "The Perfectly Planned Date"

=== Manga ===
A manga adaptation illustrated by Nokomi began serialization in Enterbrain's B's Log Comic magazine on February 5, 2020. It has been collected in six volumes as of July 2026. The manga series is licensed in English by One Peace Books.

No.	Original release date	Original ISBN	English release date	English ISBN
1	October 1, 2020	978-4-0473-6216-1	August 15, 2023	978-1-6427-3302-0
Chapters 1–5; Bonus: "Eumiella in Younger Times"
2	November 1, 2021	978-4-0473-6681-7; 978-4-0473-6793-7 (SE)	January 16, 2024	978-1-6427-3303-7
Chapters 6–11; Bonus: "A Day in the Life of Patrick"
3	February 1, 2023	978-4-0473-7355-6	June 18, 2024	978-1-6427-3329-7
Chapters 12–16; Bonus: "A Discussion on Maid Uniforms"
4	March 1, 2024	978-4-0473-7808-7	February 18, 2025	978-1-6427-3440-9
Chapters 17–20; Bonus: "The Daily Life of Ryu"
5	August 1, 2025	978-4-0473-8536-8	November 10, 2026	978-1-6427-3574-1
Chapters 21–23; Bonus: "Eumiella Dolkness, a Survey Report"; Bonus 2
6	July 31, 2026	978-4-0450-0191-8	—	—

=== Anime ===
An anime television series adaptation was announced on March 24, 2023. It is produced by Jumondou and directed by Minoru Yamaoka, with scripts written by Fumihiko Shimo, character designs handled by Hitomi Kaiho and Lo Ho Kim, and music composed by Kana Utatane. The series aired from January 9 to March 26, 2024, on AT-X and other networks. The opening theme song is "Love or Hate?", performed by Mayu Maeshima, while the ending theme song is "Love on a Different Level" (好きがレベチ, Suki ga Rebechi), performed by Fairouz Ai and Rina Hidaka as their respective characters. The first episode features an insert song titled "Ray of Light" performed by Hanatan, which serves as opening of Light Magic and the Hero. Crunchyroll streamed the series. Plus Media Networks Asia licensed the series in Southeast Asia.

==== Episodes ====
No.	Title (Note: English translated titles are taken from Crunchyroll.)	Directed by	Storyboarded by	Original release date
1	"The Hidden Boss Enrolls in the Academy"; Transliteration: "Ura Bosu, Gakuen ni Nyūgaku Suru" (Japanese: 裏ボス、学園に入学する)	Shunji Yoshida	Minoru Yamaoka	January 9, 2024
Alicia Ehnleit is late for her first day at the Royal Academy after using her light magic to heal an old lady. Because the gate cannot reopen, she is forced to use a hole in the wall to get in. She meets three guys, Oswald Grimsarde, William Ares, and prince Edwin Valschein. Later at orientation, she meets a girl whom she sees a strange dark aura around and who knows her name. It is then revealed that this is all an Otome RPG. The focus then switches to the other girl, Yumiella Darknet, who is the game's hidden boss. Her narration explains that she was a Japanese college student who was hit by a truck and reincarnated in the game's world as Yumiella. In her youth, Yumiella spent a lot of time level grinding. She realizes she doesn't know what her level is now. At orientation, the Academy instructors check all the student's levels. To everybody's shock, Yumiella is revealed to be Level 99.
2	"The Hidden Boss Shows Her True Strength"; Transliteration: "Ura Bosu, Jitsuryoku o Miseru" (Japanese: 裏ボス、実力を見せる)	Choi In-seop & Kim Cheng-de	Ryoji Fujiwara	January 16, 2024
Nobody believes Yumiella is Level 99, even after checking it again. Yumiella decides to just own it and insists it's true while people start accusing her of cheating. She is harassed by Edwin and the captured targets, but she directs them to talk to Alicia. Later in a swordsmanship class, Yumiella faces William in a mock swordfight and sends him flying with one hit. Then in a magic class, the students take turns shooting a suit of armor with magic attacks. Yumiella disintegrates it with her dark magic. Edwin and the Headmaster arrive with expulsion paperwork, threatening to expel Yumiella unless she can prove she's truly Level 99. In response, Yumiella creates a black hole in the sky and then makes it disappear, leaving them traumatized.
3	"The Hidden Boss Is Summoned to the Castle"; Transliteration: "Ura Bosu, Oshiro ni Manekareru" (Japanese: 裏ボス、お城に招かれる)	Kiyoto Nakajima	Nagisa Miyazaki	January 23, 2024
Following the black hole incident, Yumiella is summoned before the King and Queen, where she pledges her service to the Kingdom's defense after the knight captain Adolf challenges her to prove her strength. That's a lie, of course, as she thinks to herself that she's totally planning to flee the Kingdom if things ever go bad. Later, she meets the Queen in her chamber, who asks her to assist in defeating the Demon Lord who will be returning in two years (which she was preparing to do anyway), although it would be bad for the Royal Family's legitimacy if they aren't the ones to actually defeat him. She explains that there's an extremist faction working against the King, led by Duke Hillrose, and Yumiella's parents are part of it. Back at the Academy, the other girls begin to warm up to Yumiella as she starts getting marriage offers from several men, none of whom she's interested in. She also attracts the attention of Duke Hillrose's daughter, Eleonora. They become friends and after learning that she has a crush on Edwin, Yumiella agrees not to intervere as she has no interest in him. Later at lunch, Alicia approaches Yumiella and asks if she is the Demon Lord.
4	"The Hidden Boss Attends Field Lessons"; Transliteration: "Ura Bosu, Yagai Enshū ni Deru" (Japanese: 裏ボス、野外演習に出る)	Kenichiro Watanabe	Kenichiro Watanabe	January 30, 2024
Yumiella denies being the Demon Lord, but the capture targets arrive and start accusing her of it, or at least of doing something evil. Yumiella chides them for being too weak to face the Demon Lord, and gives everyone present some advice on how to most efficiently level up. However, they all consider her advice insane and reckless and as a result, the girls all begin distancing themselves from her again. Yumiella starts to wonder if Alicia is also a reincarnated person from her world, but after observing her for a day, she concludes that's not the case at all. Later, while studying with Edwin, Alicia reveals that Yumiella doesn't look human to her; she sees Yumiella as some kind of shadowy entity. Animals also seem to be frightened by her. Yumiella meets the new principal; the previous having resigned presumably due to him underestimating Yumiella, who assigns her to oversee a field lesson where a bunch of students go out and fight monsters to level up. She and a male student, Patrick Ashbatten, discuss how to make the process more efficient. Yumiella uses her Monster-Calling Flute to summon more monsters for her classmates to fight, despite Patrick's protests. After the battle, she uses the Flute again, but uses a Dark Bind spell to immobilize the monsters so the students can kill them safely. One monster attacks Yumiella and Patrick blocks it, injuring his arm. Yumiella heals him with dark magic, admitting that dark magic healing looks really gross. Then she uses the Flute and Dark Bind several more times, to her classmates' chagrin.
5	"The Hidden Boss Finds a Conversation Partner"; Transliteration: "Ura Bosu, Hanashiaite ga Dekiru" (Japanese: 裏ボス、話し相手が出来る)	Yui Kobe	James Hong	February 6, 2024
Yumiella starts spending more time with Patrick during training. Later, Yumiella starts wondering about the real Yumiella's motivations and reasons for having dark magic. Later, at another field lesson, Yumiella gets put on medic duty and told not to use the Flute again. Of course, she uses the Flute again after making the students choose between it or getting physically injured and healed with dark magic. She finds herself growing concerned about what Patrick thinks about her. Later, Alicia arrives and apologizes to Yumiella for thinking she was the Demon Lord. Edwin, having learned about her earlier actions using Flute and endangering the students, accuses her of being a threat to the Kingdom, but Patrick shows up and defends her actions. In response, Edwin leaves with Alicia. Yumiella realizes she wants to be friends with Patrick, but figures that might be asking too much.
6	"The Hidden Boss Participates in the Martial Arts Competition"; Transliteration: "Ura Bosu, Bujutsu Taikai ni Deru" (Japanese: 裏ボス、武術大会に出る)	Lee Ji-ho & Kim Cheng-de	James Hong	February 13, 2024
Yumiella spends the entire summer break practicing sword fighting with Patrick and giving advice to female students. At one point, she is able to talk to Alicia without the capture targets getting in the way. She gives Alicia advice on handling her light magic. Later, she and Patrick begin to spend more time with each other, which the other female students notice. After summer break ends, the Academy holds a martial arts tournament. Even though the real Yumiella didn't take part in it, she decides to enter it when she finds out the grand prize is an amulet that amplifies dark magic. Ronald allows her to, but it is revealed that he expected her to enter it in hopes of showing her off to the nobles in the audience; however, she is very well aware of his motive. As the competition begins, she discovers that the capture targets are also taking part in it. William, having been training for the entire summer break, reveals that he wants to be stronger than Captain Adolf. During the sword fighting portion, all of Yumiella's opponents withdraw, except for William, who fights her with a powerful sword, but she beats him by destroying his sword with a "Yumiella Punch"; Adolf is the only one who notices this. During the magic portion, Oswald is able to score a perfect 100 points, confident that Yumiella won't be able to beat him. Alicia also performs well thanks to Yumiella's advice, debuting her new spell, "Sun Rain". When it is Yumiella's turn, she uses the same black hole spell from earlier, but unintentionally creates a typhoon. The coach gives her 300 points just to get her to stop, making her the winner of the competition, to Oswald's dismay. Once the typhoon is gone, she is awarded the amulet, making her even more powerful than she was before.
7	"The Hidden Boss Attempts Dancing"; Transliteration: "Ura Bosu, Dansu ni Idomu" (Japanese: 裏ボス、ダンスに挑む)	Minoru Yamaoka	Tetsuji Nakamura	February 20, 2024
Close to the end of school year, students have once again been distancing themselves from Yumiella after the events of the martial arts tournament, except for Patrick. When Alicia's things go missing, Edwin accuses Yumiella, but Patrick defends her as there is no proof; Yumiella remembers that her real counterpart usually bullies Alicia. Later, Yumiella discovers that one of Eleonora's friends is the culprit, having been doing this without her knowing. She warns Eleonora to not let anyone know about this for the sake of her winning Edwin's heart. Yumiella later tells Patrick of her questionable decisions to help Alicia. Eleonora starts to follow Yumiella, annoying her so much that she tries several attempts to end her friendship with her, to no avail. Later, Yumiella at first does not wish to attend the upcoming party at the end of the year, but after remembering an event that involves Alicia spending time with one of the capture targets, she changes her mind. She reluctantly agrees to wear a dress at her maid and Eleonora's insistence. At the party, she dances with Patrick, who struggles to confess his feelings towards her, even after she turns down the offer of another man asking her to dance with him, as she tells him she is only into men that are stronger. Meanwhile, Alicia drags Edwin outside to view the stars together, leaving the other capture targets behind as they both go looking for them.
8	"The Hidden Boss Meets a Dragon"; Transliteration: "Ura Bosu, Doragon ni Deau" (Japanese: 裏ボス、ドラゴンに出会う)	Shunji Yoshida	Koichi Ohata	February 27, 2024
Patrick tries to invite Yumiella on a date and she reluctantly agrees; it is revealed that Patrick has been training in the dungeons for some time to impress her. At the start of the second school year, Yumiella turns up with a strange egg. The episode then goes through a flashback that explains how she found it. Yumiella is approached by a student named Jessica Monford, who is meant to become one of Alicia's friends. She requests her help in dealing with a dragon that is threatening her town and Yumiella agrees. After meeting Jessica's father Baron Monoford, Yumiella goes with two of the Baron's guards. After finding the dragon, the guards hide, but Yumiella was able to easily defeat it, only for another one to appear. She defeats this dragon too. Entering their cave, she finds a dragon egg, ending the flashback. She tells Patrick about the egg, who then explains its purpose. It is revealed that the egg was originally meant to be found by Alicia. As she takes care of the egg, Alicia becomes more frightened of Yumiella. When the egg is about to hatch, she and Patrick go to her mansion. They name the baby dragon Ryu; its appearance and power frightens Patrick and Yumiella's maid while Yumiella bonds with it. Ryu grows bigger overnight and his presence scares many of the students, especially Edwin, who is humiliated when Ryu harmlessly bites him and vows revenge. Eleanora is however not scared of Ryu and also bonds with him. They then provide Ryu a home in the school's storehouse. As the students' fear of Yumiella increases, Patrick again fails to confess his feelings to Yumiella after learning that she is a bit scared of flying. She decides to take her first flight with Ryu, but soon lets herself freefall back on the school grounds, but not before sending Ryu back on his own. Patrick quickly takes her to the clinic despite her claims that she isn't hurt. A few days later, as Yumiella walks through town to buy supplies for Ryu, she is approached by a spy from the Kingdom of Remlest, who requests a private chat with her.
9	"The Hidden Boss is Solicited by an Enemy Nation"; Transliteration: "Ura Bosu, Tekkoku ni Kanyū Sareru" (Japanese: 裏ボス、敵国に勧誘される)	Yun Neung-tae & Kim Cheng-de	James Hong	March 5, 2024
At a restaurant, the spy introduces himself as Linus and invites Yumiella to live in his kingdom after revealing that he had known a lot about her history, but she turns it down. They then notice that a group of soldiers, who have been tailing them, coming into the building, but they escape. Yumiella later talks to Patrick about their relationship and helps Eleanora pass a make-up exam. Patrick then spends his time fighting in the dungeons, which leads Yumiella to believe that he already has a girlfriend. After Edwin talks to Patrick, he apologizes to Yumiella for his antagonism. Ronald tells Yumiella that Edwin has changed his opinion on her due to talking to Patrick, since they are both princes of their country. He also informs her that Alicia hasn't been able to level up thanks to the capture targets, so she invites Alicia to train in the dungeons with her, but she declines out of fear and leaves. The next day, Alicia has disappeared and the capture targets believe that she was kidnapped. Alicia is then seen walking into the woods, seemly in a trance.
10	"The Hidden Boss Enters a Dungeon"; Transliteration: "Ura Bosu, Danjon ni Moguru" (Japanese: 裏ボス、ダンジョンにもぐる)	Yui Kobe	Tetsuji Nakamura	March 12, 2024
Yumiella and Ryu find Alicia and bring her back to her senses. She explains that something keeps taking control of her body and makes her do things without her thinking about it, such as enrolling in the Academy, showing off her Sun Rain spell at the tournament, and taking Edwin outside at the dance. Yumiella realizes that these were all important events to the game's plot, and surmises that since Alicia is the protagonist of the game, the world itself is making her play out the important parts of the plot. Since the world now wants Alicia to level up, Yumiella takes her to that dark-type dungeon. They are denied entry, but Ryu scares away the guards, allowing them to pass. Alicia struggles to make her way through the dungeon compared to Yumiella, who is very well experienced. When they reach the final floor, Alicia can't beat the boss, forcing Yumiella to defeat it herself. Alicia survives thanks to a protection amulet that Yumiella gave her earlier, but it can only be used once. For beating the boss, they are rewarded with more protection amulets that Yumiella gives to Alicia before a teleportation function sends them back outside. They go through the dungeon several more times, as Alicia levels up a lot and gains a bunch of new spells. On one run, they get a dark-type sword that Alicia can't use, so Yumiella takes it. After many runs, Alicia finally manages to defeat the boss without Yumiella's help and they are given a light-type sword, which Yumiella cannot touch due to its powerful light magic. Giving the sword to Alicia, they decide to go to the Demon Lord's domain, but thick fog prevents them from going any further; the game world won't let them go there until the right time, so they decide to go back to the Academy. Once back, Alicia reunites with the capture targets, who finally show Yumiella some respect. Yumiella also gives Patrick a wind-type spear that she got from the dungeon. As Alicia shows off her newly upgraded skills, this inspires the capture targets to train harder so they can level up too. Yumiella considers taking Alicia to a harder dungeon next time, which worries Patrick; the latter having known about Yumiella's actions.
11	"The Hidden Boss Is Confessed To"; Transliteration: "Ura Bosu, Kokuhaku Sareru" (Japanese: 裏ボス、告白される)	Kenichiro Watanabe	Koichi Ohata	March 19, 2024
In the afternoon, Yumiella watches Alicia and the capture targets train. Later, a stranger invites her to a classroom to perform an experiment that requires for Yumiella to wear anti-magic cuffs that disables her powers. The stranger then reveals himself to be an assassin who is also accompanied by other assassins who plan to kill her, but she easily breaks free with her immense strength (which the anti-magic cuffs could not disable) and defeats them. After they are arrested, Ronald suspects that someone hired them. Two days later, another assassin tries to kill Yumiella while she's sleeping, but fails as her body is unbelievably durable. While telling Patrick about the attempted assassinations, another assassin shoots arrows at them, but Yumiella intercepts the attack and takes down the assassin. To avoid endangering students, Yumiella goes into town in disguise and helps convince a young boy, who also has dark hair, to try and make friends. Another group of assassins try to kill her, but she easily defeats them and hands them over to the authorities after failing to get any information out of them. After learning that Rita has been poisoning her tea (which proves ineffective on her), she learns that Rita's sister Sara is being held hostage by Yumiella's father Count Dolkness to bribe her into murdering his daughter; it turns out he was the one who hired the assassins from earlier. Heading to the Dolkness estate, Yumiella rescues Sara and goes to confront her parents, learning that the reason why they tried to kill her because she was deemed a traitor due to her supporting the king and also because of her black hair, as well as refusing past arranged marriages. Yumiella then forces her parents to give the estate to her and threatens to unleash her black hole spell if they refuse. Now countess, Yumiella informs the situation to the king and plans to end the discrimination against those who have black hair, and later offers Patrick to be her adoptive son, to his confusion. The king soon learns that the Demon Lord is preparing for an attack on the kingdom and arranges an army, with Captain Adolf, Alicia, the capture targets, and Yumiella taking part in it. That night, Patrick (now at Level 60) talks with Yumiella about the upcoming war and, after some struggle with confessing his feelings towards her, kisses her as the fireworks begin. The next day, the war begins as the Demon Lord sends his army to attack the kingdom. The king's army and some of the students from the academy prepare for battle while Yumiella, Alicia, and the capture targets travel to the Demon Lord's domain on Ryu.
12	"The Hidden Boss Battles the Demon Lord"; Transliteration: "Ura Bosu, Maou to Tatakau" (Japanese: 裏ボス、魔王と戦う)	Minoru Yamaoka	Koichi Ohata	March 26, 2024
In a flashback before the war, Patrick gives Yumiella a protection amulet for a precaution. During the war, Patrick leads a squadron of the king's army against the Demon King's forces. Meanwhile, Yumiella's group arrive at his castle. Yumiella sends Ryu to be with Patrick so that he won't fall under the Demon Lord's control. Reaching the throne room, Alicia and two of the capture targets are caught in a trap, but Yumiella frees them. The group then fight the Demon Lord, but he proves to be a strong foe, resulting in their protection amulets being destroyed (except for Yumiella's). When Yumiella breaks off his helmet, it reveals a human face with black hair. The Demon Lord reveals that he was once a human who served a past king, but was exiled out of people's fear of his capabilities (which was actually part of the king's plan to use him for his own means), eventually becoming the Demon Lord and developing a hatred towards humans; Yumiella is very well aware of his backstory as she had played the game many times in her past life. After failing to reason with him and turning down his offer to join forces, the Demon Lord summons multiple black holes and fights Yumiella one on one, but she defeats him. The Demon Lord expresses graduate of her for putting him out of his misery as he is pulled into his own black holes. Everyone escapes as the black holes destroy the castle. However, Alicia suddenly stabs Yumiella, but she survives thanks to her protection amulet. The game world is again making Alicia play out its plot, to which she must now fight Yumiella right after the battle against the Demon Lord. The capture targets try to stop her, but are overpowered. Yumiella falsely claims that the Demon Lord put a curse on Alicia as a final ploy against them. Alicia is still unable to control herself, but as Edwin tries to stop her, he confesses his feelings to Alicia before the other capture targets can, breaking her "curse". The group then proceed to fight the Demon Lord's approaching army, defeating them just as Patrick arrives on Ryu. The group reunite with the king's army, where they find Eleonora helping to tend the injured. Yumiella, Alicia, and the capture targets are hailed as heroes. In the aftermath, the group return to the kingdom. Yumiella presents her cover story of the Demon Lord cursing Alicia to the king to ensure that she doesn't get severely punished, and later spends time with Patrick, the capture targets, and Eleonora. The story ends with Yumiella traveling with Patrick and Ryu to a newly discovered dungeon.

== See also ==
- The Ossan Newbie Adventurer, Trained to Death by the Most Powerful Party, Became Invincible, another light novel series with the same illustrator
