= Even Though I'm a Super Timid Noble Girl, I Accepted the Bet from My Cunning Fiancé =

Japanese light novel series

- First light novel volume cover featuring Rufus Stan (left) and Pia Rockwell (right)

弱気MAX令嬢なのに、辣腕婚約者様の賭けに乗ってしまった (Yowaki MAX Reijō nanoni, Ratsuwan Konyakusha-sama no Kake ni Notte Shimatta)
- Genre: Fantasy; Isekai; Romantic comedy
- Novel series
- Written by: Hiro Oda
- Published by: Shōsetsuka ni Narō
- Original run: January 12, 2020 – January 22, 2020
- Light novel
- Written by: Hiro Oda
- Illustrated by: Tsubasa.V
- Published by: Enterbrain
- Imprint: B's Log Bunko
- Original run: August 15, 2020 – April 15, 2024
- Volumes: 7
- Manga
- Written by: Hiro Oda
- Illustrated by: Aji Murata
- Published by: Kadokawa Shoten
- Imprint: Flos Comic
- Magazine: KadoComi
- Original run: February 8, 2021 – present
- Volumes: 5
- Anime television series
- Directed by: Nobuaki Nakanishi
- Written by: Hiroko Fukuda
- Music by: Moe Hyūga; Natsuki Hamada
- Studio: Jumondou
- Licensed by: Crunchyroll
- Original network: AT-X, Tokyo MX, Sun TV, KBS Kyoto, BS Asahi
- Original run: October 4, 2026 – present
- Episodes: 7
- icon

Even Though I'm a Super Timid Noble Girl, I Accepted the Bet from My Cunning Fiancé (Note: Japanese: 弱気MAX令嬢なのに、辣腕婚約者様の賭けに乗ってしまった, Hepburn: Yowaki MAX Reijō nanoni, Ratsuwan Konyakusha-sama no Kake ni Notte Shimatta) is a Japanese light novel series written by Hiro Oda and illustrated by Tsubasa.V. It was originally serialized on the online publishing platform Shōsetsuka ni Narō in January 2020, before Enterbrain began publishing it as a light novel under their B's Log Bunko imprint, releasing seven volumes between August 2020 and April 2024. A manga adaptation illustrated by Aji Murata began serialization online on Kadokawa's KadoComi service under the Flos Comic label in February 2021 and has been compiled into five volumes as of February 2026. An anime television series adaptation produced by Jumondou premiered in October 2026.

== Plot ==
The series follows Pia Rockwell, a minor villainess in the otome game Caroline and the Rainbow Magic Sweets. She is the reincarnation of a Japanese doctorate student, regaining her memories after a childhood illness. With her newfound knowledge, she decides to move away from her game's fate as a villainess, instead following her past life studying paleontology, with the aim of becoming a paleontologist. Her dream is complicated by her engagement to Rufus, the Prime Minister's son. She wants to break off the engagement, not only so she can fulfill her dream of becoming a paleontologist, but also to avoid banishment.

== Characters ==
Pia Rockwell (ピア・ロックウェル, Pia Rokkuueru)
Voiced by: Miku Itō (voice drama, anime)
A 17-year-old woman and Rufus's fiancee. In her previous life, she was a doctorate student studying paleontology, who was killed during a robbery. In the original game, Pia only had a minor role, being a nameless silhouette who was Rufus's original fiancee and was banished after an outburst. Knowing this fate, Pia aims to change her past, instead wanting to become a paleontologist. She has a timid personality. Her name was Pia Parmesan (ピア・パルメザン, Pia Parumezan) in the web novel.
Rufus Stan (ルーファス・スタン, Rūfasu Sutan)
Voiced by: Ryōta Ōsaka (voice drama, anime), Shizuka Ishigami (anime, child)
Pia's fiancé. In the original game, he was engaged to her, but broke off the engagement after she threw away some magical cookies, leading to her banishment. He then falls in love with Caroline, the game's heroine. When they were ten years old, Pia wanted to break off her engagement to Rufus, knowing of her fate; instead, Rufus make a bet about their engagement, promising to give her a lot of money and territory in seven years if he ever fell in love with Caroline.
In truth, Rufus fell in love with Pia due to misunderstanding her fears as losing him, not his status nor wealth. Pia's lack of interest in noble life and hyper fixation on fossils made her endearing.
Henry Cox (ヘンリー・コックス, Henrī Kokkusu)
Voiced by: Haruki Ishiya (voice drama, anime)
Erin White's fiancee and one of the capture targets; he is a knight with a strong sense of justice. Pia, out of friendship with Erin, tried to save Henry from being brainwashed by Caroline's cookies; overfeeding him with rare dragon meat at lunch. As a result, he stopped eating the cookies, slowly overcoming the trance; allowing Henry to salvage his relationship with Erin.
Caroline Ramsey (キャロライン・ラムゼー, Kyarorain Ramuzē)
Voiced by: Rina Hidaka (anime)
Caroline is like Pia who lived a previous life and tries to win all the love interests and banish all the "villainesses". However, her actions backfire when the men were in a posion from the cookies she gave them and "villainesses" have witness and alibis that prevents them for being banished, and is called out for going after the men who are engaged while going after Phillip. After Rufus calls out to Caroline for disgraceful actions, she tries to order Phillip to banish Rufus, but is prevented when the king arrives and arrests her and Phillip. Pia is send to prison for trying to banish Rufus and Pia, and is currently a suspect about the poision in the cookies.
Erin White (エリン・ホワイト, Erin Howaito)
Voiced by: Sora Amamiya (anime)
The first friend Pia made. Erin is the childhood friend and fiancee of Henry. When Henry started falling under Caroline's thrall, Erin retreated to her territory out of pain. Though thanks to Pia, Henry wasn't lost; allowing the two to rebuild what Caroline nearly destroyed.
Amelia Keys (アメリア・キース, Ameria Kīsu)
Voiced by: Haruka Shiraishi (anime)
Phillip (フィリップ, Firippu)
Voiced by: Shogo Sakata (anime)
The Prince and the main love interest of Caroline. He tries to banish Rufus after being ordered by Caroline, but is prevented his father shows up and arrests Phillip for trying to banish Rufus and Pia when their efforts helped the kingdom improve, Phillip is send to a noble prison for abusing the authority of the royal family.
Mike (マイク, Maiku)
Voiced by: Shōya Ishige (anime)
"Uncle Johnny"
A mysterious man who sometimes visits Pia, to ask about her work in fossils. Rufus personally knows who Johnny really is, but refuses to tell Pia; only explaining that he holds a rank higher than the Stan family, allowing him to bypass the guards assigned to her.
It later turns out that Uncle Johnny is the king. He wore commoner clothes and shaved, disguising himself to make Pia feel at ease around him; having heard of her anxiety with attending high society gatherings.

== Media ==
=== Light novel ===
Hiro Oda originally posted the series on the online publishing platform Shōsetsuka ni Narō, releasing nine chapters and two epilogues from January 12 to 22, 2020. It was later picked up for publication by Enterbrain, which began publishing it as a light novel featuring illustrations by Tsubasa.V under their B's Log Bunko imprint. The first volume was released on August 15, 2020; seven volumes were released before Oda's death on June 4, 2024.

No.	Release date	ISBN
1	August 15, 2020	978-4-04-736208-6
2	March 15, 2021	978-4-04-736523-0
3	November 15, 2021	978-4-04-736841-5
4	June 15, 2022	978-4-04-737080-7
5	December 15, 2022	978-4-04-737298-6
6	August 12, 2023	978-4-04-737571-0
7	April 15, 2024	978-4-04-737892-6

=== Manga ===
A manga adaptation illustrated by Aji Murata began serialization online on Kadokawa's KadoComi service under the Flos Comic label on February 8, 2021. The series' chapters have been compiled into five tankōbon volumes as of February 16, 2026.

No.	Release date	ISBN
1	August 5, 2021	978-4-04-680733-5
2	March 16, 2022	978-4-04-681313-8
3	December 16, 2022	978-4-04-681963-5
4	January 17, 2024	978-4-04-682692-3
5	February 16, 2026	978-4-04-684299-2

=== Anime ===
An anime television series adaptation was announced on October 14, 2025. The series will be produced by Jumondou and directed by Nobuaki Nakanishi, with Hiroko Fukuda handling series composition, Hyun Sik Choi designing the characters, and Moe Hyūga and Natsuki Hamada composing the music. It premiered on October 4, 2026, on AT-X and other networks. The opening theme song is "Gōki MAX Sengen" (強気MAX宣言; 'Grand MAX Declaration'), performed by Konomi Suzuki, and the ending theme song is "Yoake Made ni" (夜明けまでに; 'Before Dawn'), performed by Miku Itō. Crunchyroll is streaming the series.

==== Episodes ====
No.	Title	Directed by (Note: Production staff information is taken from the ending credits of each episode.)	Written by	Storyboard by	Original release date
1	"I Was a Faceless, Evil NPC Heiress"; Transliteration: "Shiruetto Mobu Akuyaku Reijō Datta Watashi" (Japanese: シルエットモブ悪役令嬢だった私)	Kiyoto Nakajima	Hiroko Fukuda	Nobuaki Nakanishi	October 4, 2026
While sick with a fever, ten-year-old Lady Pia Rockwell inherits the memories of Pia Parmesan, a Japanese palaeontologist murdered after a robbery. Pia realizes she lives in an otome game world where her fiancé, Rufus, is the future heroine's love interest. According to her memories, the heroine, Caroline, will seduce Rufus and four other suitors, leading to the banishment of all five fiancées, including Pia. Determined to avoid this fate, Pia asks Rufus to break their engagement, citing a "divine revelation" that he will eventually abandon her. She plans to build a career as a palaeontologist and open a museum. Confused yet convinced of her sincerity, Rufus refuses and offers a bet: if he falls for Caroline, he will pay Pia 100 million gold; if he remains loyal through graduation, she must marry him immediately. Pia accepts, but believes fate is unchangeable. That summer on Rufus's estate, Pia begins digging for fossils and draws innovative maps of their locations. Recognizing their military and geological value, Rufus patents the maps in her name. As he spends more time with her, his feelings deepen into genuine love. While secretly protecting Pia from regular, mysterious kidnapping attempts, Rufus resolves to safeguard their shared future.
2	"Tea Party with the Love Interests"; Transliteration: "Kōryaku Kyara ga Tsudou Ochakai" (Japanese: 攻略キャラが集うお茶会)	Gi-Seop Lee	Hiroko Fukuda	Ichizō Kobayashi	October 11, 2026
At fourteen, Pia dreads the impending Condemnation Scene where Caroline steals the game's five love interests. Pressured by Crown Prince Philip, Rufus finally brings Pia into noble society, gifting her his family’s "Fairy Tear" heirloom necklace to cement their engagement. At the party, Pia spots familiar game characters, including Erin White, whose lands were saved from annual floods by Pia’s geological expertise, and her fiancé Henry Cox, one of the love interests. After meeting love interest Prince Philip and his fiancée Amelia Keith, an overwhelmed Pia steps outside with Rufus. Left alone momentarily, she is accosted by a strange man named Uncle Johnny, who fixates on a fossil she carries, an indicator of valuable oil deposits, illuminating Rufus's warnings about keeping her hobby secret from people she does not trust. When Rufus returns, Johnny departs. To publicly assert their unbreakable bond, Rufus dramatically carries Pia past the party windows while kissing her forehead, thrilling the nobility. One year later, Pia and Rufus enroll at the academy together with the characters they previously met.
3	"Attending a Scene from an Otome Game?!"; Transliteration: "Otome Gēmu no Shīn ni Sanka?!" (Japanese: 乙女ゲームのシーンに参加?!)	Myeong-Geun Kim	Mitsuyo Suenaga	Jun-Ho Hong	October 18, 2026
Pia is embarrassed to discover that Rufus submitted her fossil research paper, earning her a Doctorate without having to attend the academy first. Wanting to still experience school life, she attends classes in Political Science and Business Administration to prepare for becoming Rufus' wife. During this time, she meets love interest Professor Guy and his fiancée, Professor Sherry. Invited to Erin’s home, Pia admires the greenhouse's foreign fruits and casually shares recipes that could make them a profitable commodity among nobles. Erin expresses disbelief that the antisocial Rufus fell for her. Erin shares that she loves Henry for his honest, straightforward nature and laments her parents' loveless political marriage. When Henry acts overly informal with Pia, a jealous Rufus resolves to thrash him in upcoming knight training. Meanwhile, Pia worries about Rufus losing weight from stepping in as temporary Prime Minister while his father, Leo, is ill. Rufus reveals that Baron Ramsey has adopted a girl, the heroine Caroline. While visiting Leo, Pia falls asleep. Rufus arrives and discloses that Leo was actually poisoned by political enemies and is still recovering. Leo deduces that recent academy break-ins were targeting Pia's research, prompting Rufus to assign a Shadow Agent to protect her. Believing Pia is too innocent, Rufus and Leo agree to keep the criminal threats and their protective measures a secret from her.
4	"The Overprotective, Cunning Fiancé"; Transliteration: "Kagohona Ratsuwan Konyakusama" (Japanese: 過保護な辣腕婚約者様)	Tomoki Watanabe	Hiroaki Nagashima	Ryōji Fujiwara	October 25, 2026
After Pia becomes severely near-sighted, Rufus gets her glasses, and her mother restricts her workday to seven hours as bridal training begins with Rufus' mother. Leo recovers and resumes his role as Prime Minister, appointing Rufus as his assistant. Uncle Johnny visits, making her bodyguard Mike nervous, and offers her 100,000 gold daily to survey the southern coast near Deru. A letter from her father begging her to accept sways Pia, who reasons the wealth will secure her future if Caroline steals Rufus. With Rufus's blessing, Pia hires workers to assist her. Astounded by the precision of her survey maps, Rufus takes strict measures to protect her methods from being leaked. As their second academy year begins, Rufus reveals Caroline is transferring in early as she was not adopted by Baron Ramsey, she is actually his illegitimate daughter. Fearing the game might force her to bully Caroline like her character did, Pia gets Rufus to promise she and Caroline are never left alone together. Thanks to heightened security and Rufus's busy schedule with Leo, neither encounters Caroline. However, Pia notices Erin’s growing unhappiness and soon discovers Henry, another love interest, has already begun spending time with Caroline.
5	"The Timid Villain and the Outgoing Heroine"; Transliteration: "Yowaki na Akuyaku to Tsuyoki na Hiron" (Japanese: 弱気な悪役と強気なヒロイン)	Gi-Seop Lee	Mitsuyo Suenaga	Minoru Yamaoka	November 1, 2026
Erin reveals Caroline is a shameless seducer, using tales of her commoner childhood to ingratiate herself with Henry, Professor Guy, Prince Philip, and Viscount's son Jeremy. Heartbroken, Erin quits school. Pia confronts Henry, finding his personality completely shifted; resenting Erin for traits he once loved and being obsessed with Caroline. Pia overhears Caroline mention "clearing events", gamer language indicating Caroline is another reincarnation playing the game. Convinced Caroline will steal Rufus, Pia focuses on building personal wealth for a comfortable life after banishment. Noticing Pia's distress, Rufus invites her to the theatre. Upon arrival, Pia recognizes the setting as another event from the story, and Caroline is already there. Pia is aggressively propositioned by Marius, Count Baird's son, before Rufus intervenes and warns Pia to be wary of him. Pia observes Caroline with Philip, matching the story precisely. Becoming drunk from a cocktail, an uninhibited Pia blurts out that Caroline is a reincarnation. Rufus interprets this as Caroline having received her own divine revelation and abusing that knowledge to seduce powerful men. Taking advantage of her drunkenness, Rufus asks if Pia loves him; when she admits she does, he kisses her, publicly revealing their relationship. The next morning, Rufus fails to avoid Caroline, who rushes up to him at the academy to introduce herself.
6	"A Gameplay Item and the Heroine's Secret"; Transliteration: "Kōryaku Aitemu to Hiroin no Himitsu" (Japanese: 攻略アイテムとヒロインのひみつ)	Yayafumi	Hiroko Fukuda	Jun-Ho Hong	November 8, 2026
Pia learns Erin is training to become a professional violinist. Rufus reveals Caroline ambushed him about his father's secret illness, confirming she has access to classified information. Rufus also tested cookies Caroline gave him, proving they are addictive and hallucinogenic. To counter Caroline’s plan of framing the love interests' fiancées for bullying, Pia asks Rufus to establish alibis for the innocent women. Rufus sets up complex surveillance on the fiancées and where possible has Caroline’s drugged cookies swapped for normal ones before the love interests can eat them. Pia personally manipulates Henry into eating fewer cookies, allowing the drug to wear off so he begins remembering Erin. When Amelia’s friends attack Caroline, Pia intervenes instead of Rufus who normally saves Caroline in the game, frustrating Caroline, who blurts out that she needs all five love interests to repay her father. Though Rufus is upset Pia confronted Caroline, he is intrigued Caroline is being manipulated by her father. Despite their precautions, Caroline completes Prince Philip’s storyline, prompting Philip to confess to her. Pia is upset when this brings the bullying accusations forward by an entire year, so Prince Philip breaks his engagement to Amelia at the King's birthday party instead of the graduation party.
7	"The Fateful Condemnation Scene"; Transliteration: "Unmei o Kessuru Danzai Ibento" (Japanese: 運命を決する断罪イベント)	Xie Liheng	Hiroaki Nagashima	Ryōji Fujiwara	November 15, 2026
Philip summons Henry, Guy, and Jeremy to jointly condemn their fiancées: Angela for pushing Caroline downstairs, Sherry for destroying her textbooks, Erin for burning her with hot tea, and Amelia for pushing her into a pond. Thanks to Rufus's security, the girls provide witnesses and alibis; Angela was herb-gathering, Sherry was teaching, Erin was at her family mansion and Amelia was meeting the High Priest, exposing Caroline's lies. Rufus orders Caroline's arrest, but Philip banishes Rufus and Pia instead. The King arrives, revoking the banishment as Rufus is a vital member of his government and Pia's mapmaking is too valuable to lose. He arrests Caroline and has the love interests sent away for drug addiction therapy. Pia realizes Uncle Johnny was the King all along. Rufus declares he won his bet with Pia and filed their marriage license, planning a long honeymoon with her. Pia feels relieved that Caroline cannot steal Rufus, though Rufus is infuriated to learn their underage marriage license requires parental and royal signatures. For drug rehab, Philip is sent to a noble prison, Jeremy and Guy enter a medical facility, and Knight Commander Cox sweats the drug out of Henry through brutal army training. Sad their bet ended, Rufus proposes a new one: if the King approves their marriage before Pia finds a 50cm fossil, he gets a month-long hug. Meanwhile, Pia worries about the unidentified cookie drug and Baron Ramsey's unclear involvement.
8	"I Was No Longer an Evil Heiress"; Transliteration: "Akuyaku Reijōde Wanaku Natta Watashi" (Japanese: 悪役令嬢ではなくなった私)	Gi-Seop Lee & Myeong-Geun Kim	Hiroaki Nagashima	Sothina Khiev & Son Sopheapanha	November 22, 2026

=== Other ===
A voice drama was released on the voice drama service Mimicle on December 15, 2022.
