= The Barbarian's Bride =

Japanese manga series

- First tankōbon volume cover, featuring Serafina de Lavillant

姫騎士は蛮族(バルバロイ)の嫁 (Himekishi wa Barbaroi no Yome)
- Genre: Dark fantasy; Fantasy comedy; Romantic comedy
- Manga
- Written by: Noriaki Kotoba
- Published by: Kodansha
- English publisher: Kodansha (digital): NA: Seven Seas Entertainment
- Imprint: Shōnen Magazine Comics
- Magazine: Bessatsu Shōnen Magazine
- Original run: January 9, 2021 – present
- Volumes: 13
- Anime television series

The Warrior Princess and the Barbaric King
- Directed by: Takayuki Tanaka
- Written by: Miya Asakawa; Takashi Yamori
- Music by: Arisa Okehazama
- Studio: Jumondou
- Licensed by: Crunchyroll
- Original network: AT-X, Tokyo MX, BS NTV, Kansai TV, Wowow Prime
- Original run: April 9, 2026 – June 25, 2026
- Episodes: 12
- icon

The Barbarian's Bride (Japanese: 姫騎士は蛮族(バルバロイ)の嫁, Hepburn: Himekishi wa Barbaroi no Yome; lit. 'The Princess Knight is the Barbarian's Bride'), also known as The Warrior Princess and the Barbaric King, is a Japanese manga series written and illustrated by Noriaki Kotoba. It has been serialized in Kodansha's shōnen manga magazine Bessatsu Shōnen Magazine since January 2021. An anime television series adaptation, produced by Jumondou, aired from April to June 2026.

== Plot ==
Serafina de Lavillant, the strongest knight in the West, fights in a war against barbarians from the East. She is captured and presented to the barbarian's king, Veor, as a bride. She is shocked to find the king is handsome, refined, and aims to woo her, while she desperately aims to escape.

== Characters ==
Serafina de Lavillant (セラフィーナ・ド・ラヴィラント, Serafīna do Raviranto)
Voiced by: Sayumi Suzushiro (Japanese); Madeleine Norton (English)
Veor (ヴェーオル, Vēoru)
Voiced by: Satoshi Inomata (Japanese); Cris George (English)
Cersei (ツェツィ, Tsetsi)
Voiced by: Hana Hishikawa (Japanese); Lexi Nieto (English)
Alyssa Malcius (アリッサ・マルシアス, Arissa Marushiasu)
Voiced by: Aki Toyosaki
Kimaki (キマキ)
Voiced by: Miyu Tomita
Sidius (シディウス, Shidiusu)
Voiced by: Hiroshi Kamiya (Japanese); Sean Letourneau (English)
Yufa (ユファ)
Voiced by: Hisako Kanemoto
Vyufmec (ヴュフメーク, Vyufumēku)
Voiced by: Ayaka Asai
Calca Lot (カルカ・ロト, Karuka Roto)
Voiced by: Yūsuke Kobayashi
Nimuhara (ニムハラ)
Voiced by: Yurika Kubo
Vas (ヴァス, Vasu)
Voiced by: Kōichi Sōma
Guas (グアス, Guasu)
Voiced by: Yasuhiro Kikuchi
Balhas (バルハス, Baruhasu)
Voiced by: Shinpachi Tsuji
Nyrea (ナィレア, Nairea)
Voiced by: Yō Taichi

== Media ==
=== Manga ===
Written and illustrated by Noriaki Kotoba, The Barbarian's Bride started in Kodansha's shōnen manga magazine Bessatsu Shōnen Magazine on January 9, 2021. Kodansha has collected its chapters into individual tankōbon volumes. The first volume was released on June 9, 2021. As of November 9, 2026, thirteen volumes have been released.

Kodansha started publishing the manga in English, under the title The Warrior Princess and the Barbaric King, on its K Manga digital service in May 2023. In May 2024, Seven Seas Entertainment announced that it had licensed the manga for print and digital release in North America, under the title The Barbarian's Bride, with the first volume released on October 1 of the same year.

==== Volumes ====
| No. | Original release date | Original ISBN | English release date | English ISBN |
|---|---|---|---|---|
| 1 | June 9, 2021 | 978-4-06-522751-0 | October 1, 2024 | 979-8-89160-620-3 |
| 2 | November 9, 2021 | 978-4-06-525938-2 | January 14, 2025 | 979-8-89160-621-0 |
| 3 | April 8, 2022 | 978-4-06-527517-7 | May 6, 2025 | 979-8-89160-943-3 |
| 4 | September 9, 2022 | 978-4-06-529063-7 | August 12, 2025 | 979-8-89373-362-4 |
| 5 | March 9, 2023 | 978-4-06-530522-5 | December 23, 2025 | 979-8-89373-363-1 |
| 6 | August 8, 2023 | 978-4-06-532598-8 | March 24, 2026 | 979-8-89373-749-3 |
| 7 | February 8, 2024 | 978-4-06-534163-6 | July 7, 2026 | 979-8-89373-750-9 |
| 8 | October 8, 2024 | 978-4-06-537017-9 | November 10, 2026 | 979-8-89561-408-2 |
| 9 | April 9, 2025 | 978-4-06-539047-4 | March 2, 2027 | 979-8-89765-647-9 |
| 10 | October 9, 2025 | 978-4-06-541098-1 | — | — |
| 11 | April 9, 2026 | 978-4-06-543311-9 | — | — |
| 12 | June 9, 2026 | 978-4-06-543886-2 | — | — |
| 13 | November 9, 2026 | 978-4-06-545714-6 | — | — |

=== Anime ===
In October 2024, it was announced that the manga will receive an anime television series adaptation. The series is produced by Jumondou and directed by Takayuki Tanaka, with series composition by Miya Asakawa and Takashi Yamori, characters designed by Masayoshi Kikuchi, Mayumi Fujita and Hajime Hatakeyama, and music composed by Arisa Okehazama. The series was originally scheduled for October 2025, but was later delayed due to plans to improve the series' quality. The series aired from April 9 to June 25, 2026, on AT-X and other networks. The opening theme song, "Beautiful", is performed by Mayu Maeshima, while the ending theme song, "Shirubekikoto" (シルベキコト; 'What You Should Know'), is performed by Sajou no Hana. Crunchyroll is streaming the series under the title The Warrior Princess and the Barbaric King.

==== Episodes ====
| No. | Title | Directed by (Note: Production staff information is taken from the ending credits of each episode.) | Written by | Storyboard by | Original release date |
|---|---|---|---|---|---|
| 1 | "The Warrior Princess Is a Prisoner of War"; Transliteration: "Hime Kishi wa Haiboku no Toriko" (Japanese: 姫騎士は敗北の虜(とりこ)) | Takayuki Tanaka | Miya Asakawa | Takayuki Tanaka | April 9, 2026 |
During a seven-year war against barbarian forces, Knight Captain Serafina de Lavillant of Illdoren Kingdom is defeated in a duel by the brutish giant Barbarian King Veor, who claims her as a spoil of war. Fearing she has failed the people of Illdoren, she resigns herself to torture and death. She is surprised when Veor's servant, Cersei, washes and dresses her "to Veor's liking". Due to his monstrous appearance Serafina supposes she will be sacrificed in some barbarian ritual, but the confused Veor reveals he fell in love with her during their duel, so due to his family tradition of marrying strong female warriors, he intends Serafina to be his wife, much to her horror. That night Serafina dreams of seven years previously during a time of severe famine. Serafina was named Knight Commander by her brother Margrave Sidius. Shortly after she prevented three starving men attacking a merchant and gave them her own jewellery to afford to feed their families, becoming determined to conquer the barbarians for Illdoren's future prosperity. However, Sidius scolded her, since she was only made Commander to attract a superior husband, not to actually go to war. Awakening from this unpleasant dream, Serafina discovers Veor sleeping next to her, totally, scandalously naked.
| 2 | "The Unknown Is the Source of Confusion"; Transliteration: "Michi wa Rōbai no Moto" (Japanese: 未知は狼狽の素) | Shunji Yoshida | Hisashi Morimiya | Yusuke Yamamoto | April 16, 2026 |
With her chastity in question Serafina asks to die, but Veor insists holding death preferable to embarrassment is nonsense. Cersei explains Serafina was accidentally overdosed on the barbarian's sleeping drugs and fainted, so Veor looked after her all night. During breakfast, Serafina is given a quarter of meat which is bigger than she expected, upsetting her since meat is scarce in Illdoren, even for royalty. Veor reveals the animal in question is plentiful, shocking Serafina the animal is a dragon, which are only legends in Illdoren. Veor reveal his lands have forests, rivers and plentiful wildlife, depressing Serafina that Illdoren is a wasteland in comparison. She is outraged by the practice of mixed outdoor bathing, but eventually agrees to wash while Veor goes to a different stream because of the fuss she was making. Realizing the area is filled with monsters, Serafina runs away naked and encounters a young, handsome barbarian. The man is amused, revealing his own mother was from the West and also ran away when she first bathed outdoors. Serafina guesses his mother must have been part of the 16th Expedition 20 years ago. The man gives her his coat, exciting her that there is at least one civilized barbarian. Cersei reveals the man is just Veor without his beard. Serafina is so embarrassed she slaps him, but this only makes him want to marry her more, even though she still rejects him. Several days later, Serafina is actually disappointed when Veor's beard grows back.
| 3 | "Hypocrisy Is the Height of Knighthood"; Transliteration: "Gizen Koso, Kishi-dō no Kyokuchi de Aru" (Japanese: 偽善こそ、騎士道の極致である) | Kim Myeong-gun | Tsuma Sawaki | Bok-Jin Kim | April 23, 2026 |
Veor takes Serafina and Cersei to a village where he will have a meeting with the Elders. Several of his men are eager to spar with Serafina, whom they call Crystal Helmet. She is surprised that none of them hold a grudge even though she had killed several of them and they instead compliment her beauty and strength. As Veor heads off to take care of some errands, Serafina and Cersei stay in the home of two women and their children. Serafina is curious since she is sure both women are not married, and they explain they moved in together after both of their husbands were killed in the war. Serafina is suddenly overcome with guilt for possibly being responsible for their husbands' deaths and insists that they take their revenge on her. However, the women hold no grudge, pointing out due to their tribe's dangerous lifestyle, death in some form is expected. Suddenly, dragons attack the village. Serafina fights one with a pair of tongs, stabbing it in the eye and luring it away from the others, impressing Cersei. Veor and the men slay the other dragons. The tongs break and Serafina resigns herself to die, but Veor arrives in time to kill the dragon. As he thanks her for saving Cersei and the others, she starts crying uncontrollably, so he carries her in his arms.
| 4 | "A Drinking Party Clears the Fog"; Transliteration: "Shuen wa Mōmu no Hare" (Japanese: 酒宴は蒙霧(もうむ)の晴れ) | Tomoki Watanabe | Yuki Tanihata | Heon-Pyo Hong | April 30, 2026 |
Veor introduces Serafina to Dwarf Elders Vas, Guas, and Balhath who gift her a mithril sword, along with Elf Lord Karka, Dryad Nimhala and Fairy Chief Vyufumec. He explains along with the Barbarians they make up the Five Great Tribes. Serafina is depressed that Illdoren's constant invasions are treated as an amusing pastime by the Barbarians and not a real war. Veor explains the tribes only come together to fight Fiends, monsters more dangerous than dragons. Veor introduces her to Nyleia, one of Serafina's former knights who vanished after being defeated by Veor's cousin Vidal, and ended up happily marrying him. Serafina is shocked to learn Veor is only 18 years old while she is 26. She refuses to marry Veor, and Cersei is shocked when Veor apologizes to Serafina. Nyleia explains knights insist on either fighting to the death or until incapacitated, whereas Veor won by destroying her sword. From Serafina's point of view Veor has not defeated her yet, so it is her duty to continue to resist him. Serafina finds she is pleased Nyleia found happiness. Later, Serafina admits her shame at thinking of Barbarians as savages, when they are kind, honourable people. She also admits that while her duty is to save Illdoren, marriage to Veor no longer sounds so bad. Then she becomes embarrassed and hits him again.
| 5 | "Hands that Pray For Coming Conflict"; Transliteration: "Kitaru wa Atsureki no Inori-te" (Japanese: 来たるは軋轢の祈手) | Fengyu Chen | Yuki Tanihata | Jun'ichi Sakata | May 7, 2026 |
Priestess Malcius leads knights into Barbarian territory intending to rescue Serafina. Serafina starts to become restless and bored so Veor invites her to spar with his warriors. After defeating all the warriors, she duels Veor again, but the duel is a draw when both their training swords shatter. Vyufumec is impressed by their willpower, which only humans are capable of wielding due to their short lifespans. Word reaches Veor that a dragon injured by humans is nearby. After euthanizing the injured dragon, they discover the injury was caused by magic. Serafina suspects it must be a priest from the Commoneras Order, though they are not known to use offensive spells. Vyufumec reveals the uncontrolled use of magic could attract a Fiend. They find Malcius, who was the priestess assigned to Serafina's unit, using magic indiscriminately against dragons. When Serafina tries to make her stand down, Malcius is convinced she has been corrupted by the barbarians and attacks. As the power of the land has increased her magic power, Malcius is fanatically convinced her mission is blessed by God, but Veor's willpower leaves him unharmed. Malcius uses even more powerful magic that starts to twist the laws of nature, which summons a Fiend as a mass of tentacles and eyes that captures her.
| 6 | "Man-Made Disasters"; Transliteration: "Ōma wa Hito no Gō" (Japanese: 逢魔は人の業) | Kim Myeong-gun | Tsuma Sawaki | Ichizō Kobayashi | May 14, 2026 |
With his Thundering Voice, Veor blasts the Fiend open and Serafina stabs the core, destroying it. Malcius awakens in Veor's home unable to believe Serafina plans to stay with barbarians. She declares the legendary Saint Princess Wysteresia would be ashamed of Serafina, had she not been killed by barbarians 20 years ago. Veor finds this hilarious as Wysteresia is actually his mother. He fetches Wysteresia, who was like Serafina's big sister, and who immediately gropes her breasts and pushes for Serafina and Veor to marry. Serafina shockingly remembers Wysteresia was far from saintly and was considered wild even before becoming a barbarian's wife. Malcius is stunned when Wysteresia deems the Commoneras Church a cult of liars, despite being one of their saints. The barbarians celebrate the defeat of the Fiend with a feast. Malcius starts to regret her actions, which got her men killed by the Fiend. Cersei tells Malcius that she was once an Illdoren citizen before defecting. Wysteresia tells a shocked Serafina the necklace Veor gave her is actually an engagement necklace. She explains due to taking so many wives and husbands from captured Illdoren soldiers that almost all living barbarians are half-Illdoren. Serafina starts to wonder if it is alright to be happy when she still has her duty to her homeland. Veor announces the next night the Five Tribes will enact the Great Cleansing, one of the secrets of the barbarian lands.
| 7 | "Flows to Purify Corruption"; Transliteration: "Ryū Ruru wa Yodomi no Fū" (Japanese: 流るるは澱みの祓) | Xie Liheng | Hisashi Morimiya | Keiichi Sasajima | May 21, 2026 |
Serafina has a dream of an immense dragon choosing her. Veor helps Malcius realize she only has 8 years' of memories after surviving the Fiend. Malcius starts another fight with Cersei, with Serafina unsure if they are becoming friends or not. Cersei admits to Serafina she is an Illdoren. Serafina and Cersei decide to bathe, causing Malcius to realize due to searching for Serafina she has not washed in weeks. The clans head to where they defeated the Fiend and find the land transformed into dust. Veor explains Malcius magic drained the elements will, causing them to forget their natural state and become dust. Malcius feels guilt for her actions. Karka Roth explains Malcius' Book of Scripture is badly written Rijutsu text that drains will to produce heat and light. Fortunately, the cleansing reminds the elements of their natural state, returning the dust to healthy earth in which the clan's plant new trees, ensuring the forest remains healthy for future generations. Karka Roth reveals the land itself created the Fiend to drain Malcius' memory, balancing out her draining their will. As Serafina defeated the Fiend quickly, Malcius was extremely lucky to retain her personality and some memories. Cersei informs Malcius that the name Malcius means she was raised at the Malcius Abbey Orphanage, a truly wretched place, so in a sense she is lucky to have forgotten how she became an orphan and what happened to her at the orphanage.
| 8 | "A Contract in the Form of a Collaring"; Transliteration: "Yakujō wa Kubi wa no Zō" (Japanese: 約定は首環の像) | Tomoki Watanabe | Tsuma Sawaki | Keiichi Sasajima | May 28, 2026 |
Serafina and Wysteresia spar until Wysteresia wins by blinding Serafina with dirt. When Serafina complains, she is lectured that holding on to knightly codes of conduct will hold her back, making her remember a time when Wysteresia disguised herself as a peasant and let herself get kidnapped by bandits so she could find their base and beat them up. Wysteresia teaches her that her engagement necklace, which seemed to be solid, can be removed by willing it. She cleans it, but cannot put it back on. Wysteresia claims she has to sneak up on Veor, dump water on him, then cover his eyes and whisper seductively in his ear to put it back on. Serafina believes her, and Wysteresia tells Cersei she wants their relationship to progress so she can have grandchildren. Serafina tries several times, but cannot sneak up on him and runs away. Veor confides to Cersei that he feels guilty for putting the necklace on Serafina while she was unconscious and not explaining what it meant. Serafina gets Malcius to wear her clothes and lure Veor into an ambush. It works and she does the steps she was told, but still cannot put the necklace on. Veor lectures his mother on her prank and explains a chant is needed to apply the necklace. He recites it, which sounds like wedding vows, and puts the necklace on Serafina, making her very happy. Malcius cries because it seems they will never go home now.
| 9 | "Visions Upon the Scales of the Soul"; Transliteration: "Sōken wa Kokoro no Hakari" (Japanese: 想見は心の秤) | Kim Myeong-gun | Miya Asakawa | Ryoji Fujiwara | June 4, 2026 |
Malcius is upset that Serafina fits in so well with the barbarians and confronts her. Serafina indecisively says she remembers her duty to Illdoren, but she wants to prioritize being happy. While taking to Veor, she imagines returning to Illdoren with food yet becoming disgraced for being captured, then imagines having a child with Veor and freaks out. He suggests they go on a journey to broaden her perspective. In Illdoren, Sidius is informed that Serafina is missing/presumed dead and mocks his sister. Veor says they will go to the Dwarf lands as they have hot springs. Serafina and Malcius have never heard of hot springs and freak out when it is explained to them. Malcius and Cersei debate on whether dying via starvation or being eaten by a dragon is preferable and Malcius is offended that the barbarians do not consider funeral rites important. Veor commissioned Balhath to make a mithril helmet for Serafina and asks Vyufumec to teleport and ask him if it is ready; she reports it will be ready in a day. Serafina is advised to wear her armor as the route is dangerous. Veor summons a dragon for himself, Serafina, Cersei, and Malcius to ride. They are attacked by another dragon en route.
| 10 | "Steam Veils the Foothills"; Transliteration: "Yukemuri wa Fumotoshimo no Tobari" (Japanese: 湯煙は麓下の帳) | Lee Gi-Seop; Yayafumi | Yuki Tanihata | Namako Umino | June 11, 2026 |
Veor notes the dragon is far from its territory and attacking them unprovoked, which is unusual. The Dwarves distract the dragon with machine guns and flashbang grenades, allowing them to escape into tunnels, but Veor has to shield Serafina from dragon fire. They are led to the Dwarves' underground, industrialized city. A Dwarf named Kimaki guides them to the hot springs. As the girls undress, Kimaki, whom they thought was a boy, shocks them by removing her concealing garments to reveal she is a girl and 53 years old despite looking like a child. Some Dwarves take Serafina's armor to work on it. As the girls bathe, Cersei says Wysteresia also tamed a dragon, so Serafina aspires to do the same. When Serafina channels her willpower into a mithril boulder, she receives a vision of the dragon she dreamed of earlier. Serafina and Veor are embarrassed when they see each other naked in what turns out to be a mixed-bathing hot spring. She notices he is burned from taking the dragon fire and thanks him for saving her. At dinner, Cersei notices despite their earlier embarrassment, seeing each other naked might have brought Serafina and Veor closer together. Serafina becomes drunk and eats until she is full. The group goes to retrieve her new helmet.
| 11 | "Discovery is the Mother of all Queftos"; Transliteration: "Tankyū wa Kō Hito no Kigen" (Japanese: 探求は鉱人の起源) | Fengyu Chen | Hisashi Morimiya | Heon-Pyo Hong | June 18, 2026 |
The group meets Balhath, who is Kimaki's grandfather. He gives Serafina mithril bunny ears that turn into a helmet protected by a forcefield when she channels her willpower. Malcius panics because with such advanced technology and weapons, Illdoren would be doomed if the Dwarves invaded. Balhath shows them several advanced items like vehicles, robots, mechas, and weapons from a lost civilization. The Dwarves are uninterested in conquest because they spend all their time trying to understand these items. Malcius faints when Kimaki shows them a mecha she was working on. Kimaki asks about Serafina's previous crystal helmet, but is disappointed when she knows nothing about its construction. At breakfast, Kimaki says she will join them at Veor's village after Balhath pointed out humans live such short lives, so she should enjoy her time with them and study human technology. Suddenly, the dragon from before stalks the entrance. Knowing it will never stop, the Dwarves prepare for battle while Veor and Serafina, now with her armor and helmet, charge outside.
| 12 | "The Crimson Warrior of Glory"; Transliteration: "Gurenki wa Tsuwamono no Ifū" (Japanese: 紅蓮きは強者の威風) | Kiyoto Nakajima | Miya Asakawa | Takayuki Tanaka; Ryoji Fujiwara | June 25, 2026 |
Serafina and Veor battle the dragon. Veor uses his Thundering Voice to repeatedly cancel its fire breath, but it shields itself with a force field of willpower. Kimaki hurls a powerful bomb that distracts it enough for Serafina to chop off a finger. Vyufumec arrives and tells everyone to stand down. The dragon speaks, shocking the humans and dwarves who had no idea that dragons could speak, saying he only wanted to test their strength, and they passed. The dragon has no problem with the various dragons they killed in the past, saying they were senile or feral. The dragon leaves, hoping to meet their children one day. After Kimaki bids her people farewell, the group flies away on Veor's dragon. Serafina says she will work for peace between their people, then declares her love for Veor and agrees to marry him. Meanwhile, Sidius reports the failure of the 17th Expedition and Serafina's supposed death to King Ouisselbreaux. The clearly unhinged king declares he does not care how many of their people die in the process as long as he gets revenge on the Barbarians for taking his sister Wysteresia away. He orders Sidius to organize an 18th Expedition by next spring.

== Reception ==
By September 2022, the manga had over 200,000 copies in circulation.
