= Don't Hurt Me, My Healer! =

Japanese manga series and its adaptation(s)

- Cover of the first tankōbon volume, featuring Carla

このヒーラー、めんどくさい (Kono Hīrā, Mendokusai)
- Genre: Fantasy comedy
- Manga
- Written by: Tannen ni Hakkō
- Published by: Kadokawa Shoten (vol. 1-2); Media Factory (vol. 3-present)
- Imprint: MF Comics
- Magazine: ComicWalker; Monthly Comic Flapper (October 5, 2020–present)
- Original run: July 31, 2019 – present
- Volumes: 10
- Anime television series
- Directed by: Nobuaki Nakanishi
- Produced by: Naruki Fukaya; Mao Higashi; Emiko Iijima; Masami Kmakawa; Yuuka Nemoto; Kentarou Takemoto; Hiroyasu Taniguchi; Masakatsu Umeda
- Written by: Fumihiko Shimo
- Music by: Satoshi Igarashi
- Studio: Jumondou
- Licensed by: Crunchyroll (streaming); SA/SEA: Medialink
- Original network: AT-X, Tokyo MX, Kansai TV, BS11
- Original run: April 10, 2022 – June 26, 2022
- Episodes: 12

Don't Hurt Me, My Healer! (このヒーラー、めんどくさい, Kono Hīrā, Mendokusai; "This Healer's a Handful") is a Japanese fantasy comedy manga series by Tannen ni Hakkō. It has been serialized online via Kadokawa's ComicWalker website since July 2019 and has been collected in ten tankōbon volumes. An anime television series adaptation by Jumondou aired from April to June 2022.

== Plot ==
In a fantasy world full of adventuring warriors battling monsters and villains, the heroes and their party members are usually supported by a healer. Alvin, a fully-armored adventurer trying to make a name for himself, meets a dark elf named Carla on his journey who claims to be a healer. However, her spells and her attitude seem to cause him more harm than good, and after she "accidentally" hits Alvin with a curse, the two are forced to travel together.

== Characters ==
Carla (カーラ, Kāra)
Voiced by: Aguri Ōnishi (Japanese); Bryn Apprill (English)
A dark elf who claims to be a priestess and even wears the clothes of one, but most of her spells and actions seem to involve dark magic or curses, and she even physically breaks down locked doors with a Bajiquan shoulder strike. However, she does seem to know unorthodox healing magic, saving Alvin or others in dire situations. After "accidentally" hitting Alvin with a curse during their first time meeting, she claims that the two of them will die if they are ever physically too far apart from each other, forcing them to travel together.
Alvin (アルヴィン, Aruvin)
Voiced by: Takuya Satō (Japanese); Reagan Murdock (English)
A fully-armored warrior whose face is never shown, often hidden behind the faceplate of his helmet or some other object. Surprisingly weak, he claims he can only battle up to the strength of a few slimes at once, and even the aptitude test form at his Adventurer's Guild hall makes fun of his weakness. Most of his journey involves playing the tsukkomi to Carla's boke.
Mushroom (キノコ, Kinoko) / Altargaia (オルテガイア, Orutegaia)
Voiced by: Asuna Tomari (Japanese); Brittney Karbowski (English)
A sentient mushroom that Carla and Alvin encounter on their quest.
Mostly Bear (オオムネクマ, Ōmune Kuma)
Voiced by: Hiroshi Shirokuma
The first enemy Alvin encounters. After being beaten by her, Mostly Bear allows Alvin and Carla to stay in her cabin until Alvin recovers.
Cow (牛, Gyū)
Voiced by: Show Hayami
The "boss" of the Beginners' Dungeon, Cow is less interested in fighting and more in making a fun obstacle course for amateur adventurers.
Maria Deathflame (マリア・デスフレイム, Maria Desufureimu)
Voiced by: Saori Hayami
A kind-hearted necromancer who seeks to help her dead sister's spirit pass on. In contrast to Carla, she acts and sounds like more of a healer despite using dark magic.

== Media ==
=== Manga ===
Don't Hurt Me, My Healer! is written and illustrated by Tannen ni Hakkō. It began serialization in Kadokawa's ComicWalker website on July 31, 2019. It also began serialization in Media Factory's seinen manga magazine Monthly Comic Flapper on October 5, 2020. Kadokawa Shoten published the series' first two volumes in print between February and September 2020, and it then switched to Media Factory starting from volume three, which appeared in April 2021. By July 2026, ten tankōbon volumes have been released.

==== Volumes ====
No.	Release date	ISBN
1	February 21, 2020	978-4-04-064165-2
2	September 23, 2020	978-4-04-064905-4
3	April 23, 2021	978-4-04-680354-2
4	October 22, 2021	978-4-04-680808-0
5	April 22, 2022	978-4-04-681337-4
6	January 23, 2023	978-4-04-681800-3
7	October 20, 2023	978-4-04-682942-9
8	September 21, 2024	978-4-04-683946-6
9	August 22, 2025	978-4-04-685006-5
10	July 23, 2026	978-4-04-660272-5

=== Anime ===
In April 2021, an anime television series adaptation was announced by Kadokawa. It is produced by Jumondou and directed by Nobuaki Nakanishi, with Fumihiko Shimo handling the series' scripts, Chisato Kikunaga designing the characters, and Satoshi Igarashi composing the music. It aired from April 10 to June 26, 2022, on AT-X, Tokyo MX, Kansai TV, and BS11. The opening theme song is "Jellyfish na Kimi e" (ジェリーフィッシュな君へ, lit. To the Jellyfish-like You) by Aguri Ōnishi, while the ending theme song is "HERO in HEALER" by Ōnishi, who is voiced by Takuya Satō, and Asuna Tomari. Crunchyroll streamed the series outside of Asia.

==== Episodes ====
NOTE: Since the episode titles are extremely long, each one is replaced with "That's the Deal with ____".

No.	Title	Directed by	Written by	Storyboarded by	Original release date
1	"That's the Deal with Episode 1"; Transliteration: "Sonna Daiichiwa" (Japanese: そんな第一話)	Nobuaki Nakanishi	Fumihiko Shimo	Nobuaki Nakanishi	April 10, 2022
Officially titled "In this world where monsters are rampant, Alvin (male lead/armored warrior) is trying to make it as an adventurer in a land ravaged by monsters and other such baddies when he ends up getting the bad end of a fight with a bear-like creature only to be saved by the dark elf healer girl Carla (female lead/dark elf) who happens to be passing by except her personality being what it is things turn into an argument which confuses the bear creature even more and then something not in the original manga happens where they get taken back to the bear's house and some of the manga fans are like "Huh?" but see this is based on a manga that was published online before the comic was serialized called "What Story Is This?" that was set in the same world so the anime staff and manga creators asked to use this space to explain what's going on also there's no codes or hidden messages in this just so you know and that's the deal with episode 1" (魔物やモンスターがはびこる世界で冒険者の道を歩もうとするアルヴィン（主人公/甲冑の戦士）は熊の怪物と戦いピンチのところに運良くダークエルフのヒーラーの女の子カーラ（ヒロイン/ダークエルフ）が通りかかったがカーラの性格があまりにもあまりなので言い合いになり熊の怪物も困惑しさらにそのあと熊自宅に連れていかれるという原作コミックスにない展開があるので原作ファンの中には『あれ？』と思うかたもいらっしゃるでしょうけれどこれは雑誌連載以前にネットで発表されていた『これ、何の話ですか？』をいう同じ世界観の漫画を元にしているのでご了承くださいとお願いするスタッフと原作サイドの意向をこの場を借りてご説明させていただきつつなおこの長いサブタイトルには縦読みや斜め読みのような仕掛けはないのでそのこともおことわりしておきたいそんな第一話, Mamono ya Monsutā ga Habikoru Sekai de Bōkensha no Michi o Ayumō to Suru Aruvin (Shujinkō/Katchū no Senshi) wa Kuma no Kaibutsu to Tatakai Pinchi no Tokoro ni Unyoku Dāku Erufu no Hīrā no Onna no Ko Kāra (Hiroin/Dāku Erufu) ga Tōrikakatta ga Kāra no Seikaku ga Amarinimo Amari na no de Iiai ni Nari Kuma no Kaibutsu mo Konwaku Shi Sara ni Sono Ato Kuma Jitaku ni Tsurete Ikareru to Iu Gensaku Komikkusu ni Nai Tenkai ga Aru no de Gensaku Fan no Naka ni wa "Are?" to Omou Kata mo Irassharu Deshō Keredo Kore wa Zasshi Rensai Izen ni Netto de Happyōsarete Ita "Kore, Nan no Hanashi Desu Ka?" O Iu Onaji Sekaikan no Manga o Moto ni Shite Iru no de Goryōshō Kudasai to Onegai Suru Sutaffu to Gensaku Saido no Ikō o Kono Ba o Karite Gosetsumeisasete Itadaki Tsutsu Nao Kono Nagai Sabutaitoru ni wa Tate Yomi ya Naname Yomi no Yō na Shikake wa Nai no de Sono Koto mo Okotowari Shite Okitai Sonna Daiichiwa)
2	"That's the Deal with Episode 2"; Transliteration: "Sonna Dainiwa" (Japanese: そんな第二話)	Ryouki Kamitsubo	Fumihiko Shimo	Ryouki Kamitsubo	April 17, 2022
Officially titled "Forced to travel with Carla, a healer, Alvin resumes his original quest to gather antidote herbs, but on the way he ends up getting attacked in a graveyard by ghosts which they manage to escape unexpectedly, but then he falls into a trap set by goblins and basically the first half of the episode is filled with great suffering but Carla's curse is still in effect so he can't get away from her and there's even more suffering in store nevertheless and anyway these titles are really long and kind of serve double-duty as next episode previews and we're pretty curious about how many people actually listen to the whole thing and that's the deal with episode 2" (ヒーラーのカーラと一緒に旅をする羽目になったアルヴィンは本来の目的である毒消し草集めを続けようとするのだが途中の墓場でいきなりゴーストと戦闘になり思いがけない方法でどうにか切り抜けたと思ったら今度はゴブリンの罠にはまってしまうなどAパートだけでさんざん苦労する上に呪いもまだ発動中なのでカーラと離れるわけにもいかないし今後のさらなる苦労がしみじみ思いやられるそれにしてもこの長い長いサブタイトルは実は次回予告も兼ねているのだけれどちゃんと全部聞いてくれている人がどれだけいるのかいささかならず気がかりでもあるそんな第二話, Hīrā no Kāra to Issho ni Tabi o Suru Hame ni Natta Aruvin wa Honrai no Mokuteki de Aru Dokukeshi Kusa Atsume o Tsuzukeyō to Suru no da ga Tochū no Hakaba de Ikinari Gōsuto to Sentō ni Nari Omoigakenai Hōhō de Dōnika Kirinuketa to Omottara Kondo wa Goburin no Wana ni Hamatte Shimau nado Ē Pāto dake de Sanzan Kurō Suru Ue ni Noroi mo Mada Hatsudō-chū na no de Kāra to Hanareru Wake ni mo Ikanaishi Kongo no Sara Naru Kurō ga Shimijimi Omoi Yarareru Sore ni Shite mo Kono Nagai Nagai Sabutaitoru wa Jitsu wa Jikai Yokoku mo Kanete Iru no da keredo Chanto Zenbu Kiite Kurete Iru Hito ga Dore dake Iru no ka Isasaka Narazu Ki ga Kari de mo Aru Sonna Dainiwa)
3	"That's the Deal with Episode 3"; Transliteration: "Sonna Daisanwa" (Japanese: そんな第三話)	Susumu Yamamoto	Fumihiko Shimo	Hitomi Ezoe	April 24, 2022
Officially titled "Despite the terrible time he's been having during his travels with Carla the healer for two episodes Alvin tries to keep up his job as a monster-hunting adventurer which I guess shows some pretty impressive resolve except when he runs into a mushroom monster he challenges to a fight and it turns out to be tougher than expected and by the way this won't get mentioned in the series proper but its species is called matango and you might think it has an adult male voice but also given how it was drawn in the manga a childish voice might work too, and it's just one big surprise after another, but the truth is we actually wrote this title in early 2021 before we cast the voice actor, so I'm actually looking forward to who's voicing it but anyway there's more going on than the question of whether Alvin can beat the mushroom and that's the deal with episode 3" (二話までのカーラとの二人旅で大概ひどい目にあっているにも関わらずモンスター狩りの冒険者としてがんばり続けようとするアルヴィンの志の高さはなかなかのものかもしれないけれども出くわしたキノコのモンスターに戦いを挑んでみたら意外とそこそこ難敵でまた本編には出てこない設定だけれども種族はマタンゴだそうでさらに声は大人の男性かと思ったら原作のイメージでは少年っぽい声もアリとのことで意外な上にも意外さが積み増しされつつところが実はこのサブタイトルを作っている2021年前半の時点ではまだキャストが決まっておらずどんな配役になるのかも楽しみながら果たしてアルヴィンはこのキノコに勝てるのだろうかという話だけでは終わらないそんな第三話, Niwa Made no Kāra to no Futaritabi de Taigai Hidoi Me ni Atteiru ni mo Kakawarazu Monsutā Kari no Bōkensha to Shite Ganbari Ttsuzukeyou to Suru Aruvin no Kokorozashi no Takasa wa Nakanaka no Monokamo Shirenaikeredomo Dekuwashita Kinoko no Monsutā ni Tatakai o Idonde Mitara Igai to Sokosoko Nanteki de Mata Honpen ni wa Detekonai Settei Dakeredomo Shuzoku wa Matango da Sōde Sarani Koe wa Otona no Dansei kato Omottara Gensaku no Imēji de wa Shōnen ppoi Koe mo Ari to no Koto de Igaina-jō ni mo Igaisa ga Tsumimashi sa Retsutsu Tokoro ga Jitsu wa Kono Sabutaitoru o Tsukutte Iru Nisen Nijūichi-nen Zenhan no Jitende wa Mada Kyasuto ga Kimatte Orazu Donna Haiyaku ni Naru no Kamo Tanoshiminagara Hatashite Aruvin wa Kono Kinoko ni Kateru Nodarou kato Iu Hanashi Dakede wa Owaranai Sonna Daisanwa)
4	"That's the Deal with Episode 4"; Transliteration: "Sonna Daiyonwa" (Japanese: そんな第四話)	Kiyoto Nakajima	Fumihiko Shimo	Nagisa Miyazaki	May 1, 2022
Officially titled "The first dungeon Alvin tackles with Carla is designed for beginners which is very nice and so even Alvin seems to be flying through it but of course as a veteran rookie he isn't without his struggles and he once again reveals his aptitude (?) for falling into holes and even causes their mushroom monster companion to worry and come to think of it the mushroom guy who showed up last episode has a name (it's Altargaia) and there aren't many chances to call him that but we would like you to remember it and by the way if you're having trouble reading these titles to the end we just wanted to remind you that you can pause the video or maybe check the show's homepage and that's the deal with episode 4" (アルヴィンがカーラと一緒に初めてのダンジョンに挑んだところこのダンジョンが初心者向けの親切設計でだったのでさすがのアルヴィンも軽々と攻略できるかと思いきやそこはさすがベテランルーキーと呼ばれるだけあってそう簡単にいくはずもなくこれからも時々出てくる落とし穴にはまる持ち芸（？）を披露したり一緒についてきたキノコの魔物にも心配されたりそういえば前回から登場したこのキノコは名前をオルテガイアというのであんまり呼ばれる機会がないけれどいちおうご記憶いただきたくところでこのサブタイトルを読みきれない人は動画を停止状態にする以外にも番組HPで確認するという手があるのでよければそちらもご覧くださいと告知もしつつのそんな第四話, Aruvin ga Kāra to Issho ni Hajimete no Danjon ni Idonda Tokoro Kono Danjon ga Shoshinsha-muke no Shinsetsu Sekkei Dedattanode Sasuga no Aruvin mo Karugaru to Kōryaku Dekiru kato Omoikiya Soko wa Sasuga Beteranrūkī to Yobareru Dakeatte Sō Kantan ni Ikuhazu mo Naku Korekara mo Tokidoki Detekuru Otoshiana ni Hamaru Mochigei (?) o Hirō Shitari Issho ni Tsuite Kita Kinoko no Mamono ni mo Shinpai Saretari Sō Ieba Zenkai kara Tōjō Shita Kono Kinoko wa Namae o Orutegaia to Iunode Anmari Yobareru Kikai ga Naikeredo Ichiō go Kioku Itadakitaku Tokorode Kono Sabutaitoru o Yomi Kirenai Hito wa Dōga o Teishi Jōtai ni Suru Igai ni mo Bangumi Eichi Pī de Kakunin Suru to Iu te ga Arunode Yokereba Sochira mo Gorankudasai to Kokuchi mo Shitsutsu no Sonna Daiyonwa)
5	"That's the Deal with Episode 5"; Transliteration: "Sonna Daigowa" (Japanese: そんな第五話)	Yui Kōbe	Yuka Yamada	Kōji Hōri	May 8, 2022
Officially titled "The owner of the inn they visit seems very nice, but Carla accidentally forces him to reveal a surprising true form and then an old lady they happen to meet on the road also reveals an unexpected side and this confirms once again that there are monsters in this world that disguise themselves as humans but by the way the name of the inn is "Stay! Burin" and some of you might not know where that name comes from but it's from a pretty famous show so if you know it you're definitely wallowing in nostalgia right now and that's the deal with episode 5" (アルヴィンとカーラが宿屋に泊まろうとしたら人のよさそうな主人がカーラのせいで思いがけない正体をあらわしたりそれから通りすがりに出会ったおばあさんがこれまた意外な本性を持っていたりとこの世界には人間に姿をやつした魔物やモンスターがあちこちにいる場合もあることを再確認しつつも宿屋の名前の『泊まって！ぶーりん』の元ネタがわからない人ももしかしたらいるかもしれないけれどこれはもちろんあの有名な作品だから知っていればなつかしいなあ久しぶりに見てみたいなあとそういった感慨にもひたれるそんな第五話, Aruvin to Kāra ga Yadoya ni Tomarō to Shitara Hito no Yosasōna Shujin ga Kāra no Sei de Omoigakenai Shōtai o Arawashitari Sorekara Tōrisugari ni Deatta Obaasan ga Kore Mata Igaina Honshō o Motteitari to Kono Sekai ni wa Ningen ni Sugata o Yatsu Shita Mamono ya Monsutā ga Achikochi ni Iru Baai mo Aru Koto o Saikakunin Shitsutsu mo Yadoya no Namae no "Tomatte! Būrin" no Moto Neta ga Wakaranai Hito mo Moshika Shitara Iru Kamo Shirenaikeredo Kore wa Mochiron ano Yūmeina Sakuhindakara Shitte Ireba Natsukashii naa Hisashiburi ni Mite Mitai naa to Sōitta Kangai ni mo Hitareru Sonna Daigowa)
6	"That's the Deal with Episode 6"; Transliteration: "Sonna Dairokuwa" (Japanese: そんな第六話)	Shunji Yoshida	Yuka Yamada	Nagisa Miyazaki	May 15, 2022
Officially titled "As usual, Alvin and Carla have to overcome a series of crises on their travels like being attacked by a thief and running into a golem until a certain series of events leads Alvin to take massive damage and it's so extreme that he even has to take off his armor to recuperate and that becomes an opportunity for them to get in a fight and reevaluate their relationship a little and even though their fights are an important part of the show the times being what they are during cast auditions and ADR and such only so many people were allowed in the recording studio at once which is pretty tough to work around but everyone gave it their all to make the best show they could and that's the deal with episode 6" (旅の途中で盗賊に襲われたりゴーレムに遭遇したりとあいかわらず危機また危機を乗りこえていくアルヴィンとカーラだったがついにあるなりゆきからアルヴィンが大ダメージを負ってしまってまたこのなりゆきというのがあんまりななりゆきでアルヴィンも甲冑を脱いで養生する羽目になりそれがきっかけで二人がまた言いあいになったり関係性がまたちょっとだけ変わるかもしれなかったりとそんなアルヴィンとカーラのかけあいゼリフがこの作品では大事なのに今の時代はキャストのオーディションや本編の収録も一度にスタジオに入れる人数が限られていて何かと大変だけれどしかしみんなで力を合わせて切り抜けていきたいそんな第六話, Tabi no Tochū de Tōzoku ni Osowaretari Gōremu ni Sōgū Shitari to Aikawarazu Kiki Mata Kiki o Norikoete Iku Aruvin to Kāra Dattaga Tsuini Aru Nariyuki kara Aruvin ga Dai Damēji o Otte Shimatte Mata kono Nariyuki to Iu no ga Anmarina Nariyuki de Aruvin mo Katchū o Nuide Yōjō Suru Hame ni Nari Sore ga Kikkake de Futari ga Mata Iiai ni Nattari Kankei-sei ga Mata Chotto Dake Kawaru Kamo Shirenakattari to Sonna Aruvin to Kāra no Kakeai Zerifu ga Kono Sakuhinde wa Daijinano ni Ima no Jidai wa Kyasuto no Ōdishon ya Honpen no Shūroku mo Ichido ni Sutajio ni Ireru Ninzū ga Kagira Reteite Nanikato Taihendakeredo Shikashi Minnade-ryoku o Awasete Kirinukete Ikitai Sonna Dairokuwa)
7	"That's the Deal with Episode 7"; Transliteration: "Sonna Dainanawa" (Japanese: そんな第七話)	Kim Seung-deok	Yuka Yamada	Junichi Sakata	May 22, 2022
Officially titled "This show is fairly unique in that Carla is the only recurring female character although in episode 5 we did get the witch and then the thief character but the witch only gets a few seconds at the end in her young form and the thief girl doesn't get any more screen time after this so I suspect the folks at home are wondering if we're ever going to see any new female characters and so partly for you people this episode features a female character called Maria Deathflame but to set up for that we have to do a zombie story so I hope you'll enjoy that first and of course Maria has her own idiosyncrasies so you'll just have to wait to see if it meets your expectations and that's the deal with episode 7" (『このヒーラー、めんどくさい』はカーラ以外にレギュラーの女性キャラが存在せずそういう意味でもなかなかユニークな番組ながら第五話に魔女と盗賊の女の子が登場したけれど魔女のほうは若い時の姿は最後にちょこっと出ただけでまた盗賊の女の子もそのあと出番がないのでやはりそろそろまた新しい女性キャラが見てみたいし出てくるんじゃないかと予想や期待をしている皆様がたのお気持ちにこたえる意味もあってお待たせしました今回はマリア・デスフレイムという女性キャラクターが登場するけどその前段にゾンビの話があるのでまずはそちらをお楽しみいただきたくまたさらにマリアもマリアでなかなか普通ではないところもあるので果たして本当にご期待に添えるかどうかは見てのお楽しみなそんな第七話, "Kono Hīrā, Mendokusai" wa Kāra Igai ni Regyurā no Josei Kyara ga Sonzai Sezu Sōiu Imi demo Nakanaka Yunīku na Bangumi Nagara Daigowa ni Majo to Tōzoku no Onna no Ko ga Tōjō Shitakeredo Majo no Hō wa Wakai Toki no Sugata wa Saigo ni Chokotto Detadakede Mata Tōzoku no Onna no Ko mo Sono Ato Deban ga Nainode Yahari Sorosoro Mata Atarashii Josei Kyara ga Mite Mitaishi Dete Kurun Janai kato Yosō ya Kitai o Shite Iru Minasama Gata no Okimochi ni Kotaeru Imi Moatte Omataseshimashita Konkai wa Maria Desufureimu to Iu Josei Kyarakutā ga Tōjō Surukedo Sono Zendan ni Zonbi no Hanashi ga Arunode Mazuwa Sochira o Otanoshimi Itadakitaku Mata Sarani Maria mo Maria de Nakanaka Futsū de Wanai Tokoro mo Arunode Hatashite Hontō ni Go Kitai ni Soeru Kadōka wa Mite no Otanoshimi na Sonna Dainanawa)
8	"That's the Deal with Episode 8"; Transliteration: "Sonna Daihachiwa" (Japanese: そんな第八話)	Kiyoto Nakajima	Fumihiko Shimo	Ice Mugino	May 29, 2022
Officially titled "Thanks to Altargaia (reminder: this is the mushroom's name), Alvin gets out of the cell safe and sound but now that Carla and Maria are unexpectedly getting along they continue leading him around by the nose and it happens that Maria has a sweet little sister named Ellie and while avoiding spoilers regarding what trouble Ellie's gotten into it does concern Maria's status as a necromancer but I hope you won't get your hopes up for another cute female character to appear but in exchange Carla will attempt an unusual cosplay so that's the part you can look forward to and that's the deal with episode 8" (オルテガイア（キノコの名前ですのでお忘れなく）のおかげで無事に牢屋から脱出したアルヴィンだが思いがけず意気投合したカーラとマリアにまだまだ振り回され続ける羽目になりどう振り回されるかというと実はマリアにはエリーという愛する妹がいてそのエリーに関するゴタゴタについてのネタバレは避けるけれどマリアがネクロマンサーだという設定にも関わることなのでマリアみたいな可愛い女性キャラがまたもう一人出てくるとまでは期待しないで欲しいその代わりにカーラが珍しくコスプレを披露するのでそちらはぜひお楽しみにしていただきたいそんな第八話, Orutegaia (Kinoko no Namae Desunode o Wasurenaku) no Okage de Buji ni Rōya kara Dasshutsu Shita Aruvin daga Omoigakezu Ikitōgō Shita Kāra to Maria ni Madamada Furimawasare Tsuzukeru Hame ni Naridō Furimawasareru kato Iu to Jitsu wa Maria ni wa Erī to Iu Aisuru Imōto ga Ite Sono Erī ni Kansuru Gotagota ni Tsuite no Netabare wa Yokerukeredo Maria ga Nekuromansā dato Iu Settei ni mo Kakawaru Koto Nanode Maria Mitai na Kawaii Josei Kyara ga Mata Mō Hitori Detekuru to Made wa Kitai Shinai de Hoshii Sono Kawari ni Kāra ga Mezurashiku Kosupure o Hirō Surunode Sochira wa Zehi Otanoshimi ni Shite Itadakitai Sonna Daihachiwa)
9	"That's the Deal with Episode 9"; Transliteration: "Sonna Daikyūwa" (Japanese: そんな第九話)	Masahiro Okamura	Yuka Yamada	Masahiro Okamura	June 5, 2022
Officially titled "This episode features even more female guest characters hot on the heels of Maria and Ellie and by the way even though we jumble the order now and then we mostly follow the source material but because the Medusa and Dryad episode would let us get a few more rare female characters on-screen we originally had the idea to put them in episode 2 or 3 to get people more invested except putting them in episode 2 or 3 really would be a little too extravagant and kind of mess up the flow so we decided against it and that's a fun little behind the scenes anecdote but anyway now it's finally time to reveal them and that's the deal with episode 9" (マリアとエリーに続いて今回もゲストで女性キャラが登場する回でところでこの番組は時々前後が入れかわったりしながらもおおむね原作の流れに沿ってエピソードが並んでいるのだがしかし実はこのメデューサとドリアードの回についてはせっかく珍しく女の子がいっぱい出る話なんだからもっと早くなんならいっそのこと二話とか三話ぐらいにもってきて見てくれる人の気持ちを引きつけようかというアイデアも最初にあったけれどもやはり二話三話でやるにはゴージャスすぎるし流れがちょっとちぐはぐになる感もかもし出しそうなのでやっぱりやめておくことになったという裏話もありつつそれだけに満を持してお届けするそんな第九話, Maria to erī ni tsudzuite konkai mo gesuto de josei kyara ga tōjō suru kaide tokorode kono bangumi wa tokidoki zengo ga ire kawattari shinagara mo ōmune gensaku no nagare ni sotte episōdo ga narande iru nodaga shikashi jitsuwa kono mede~yūsa to doriādo no kai ni tsuite wa sekkaku mezurashiku on'nanoko ga ippai deru hanashina ndakara motto hayaku nan'nara isso no koto ni-wa toka san-wa gurai ni motte kite mite kureru hito no kimochi o hikitsukeyou ka to iu aidea mo saisho ni attakeredomo yahari de yaru ni wa gōjasu sugirushi nagare ga chotto chiguhagu ni naru kan mo kamoshidashi-sōnanode yappari yamete oku koto ni natta to iu urabanashi moaritsutsu soredakeni manwojishite o todoke suru Sonna Daikyūwa)
10	"That's the Deal with Episode 10"; Transliteration: "Sonna Daijūwa" (Japanese: そんな第十話)	Shūji Miyazaki	Fumihiko Shimo	Kenichi Imaizumi	June 12, 2022
Officially titled "In the second half of this episode, we enter the "What Story Is This?" arc (though actually it's just the next two episodes) so let me explain once again for people not in the know that "What Story Is This?" is the webcomic version of the story that would eventually be published as "Don't Hurt Me, My Healer!", so this arc isn't included in the printed comic but you should still be able to read it so go ahead and do that if you like but at the same time there's also a thankless role in the first half so I'll ask you to keep an eye on that because it's going to be clear it's an important event if you keep watching and that's the deal with episode 10" (いよいよ今回の後半から本格的に『これ、なんの話ですか？』編に突入するわけですが（そうは言っても今回と次の二回だけだけど）知らない人のためにもう一度説明しておくと『これ、なんの話ですか？』とはタイトルが『このヒーラー、めんどくさい』になる以前つまり商業連載になる前にWEBの投稿サイトに掲載されていたものでだからコミックスには収録されていないけれどまだ読めるはずなのでよければそちらもどうぞと言いつつ前半にも見逃せない憎まれ役が出てくるのでそっちにもご注目いただきたいと言うそのわけは今後も引き続き見ていただければわかるなにげに大事なイベント満載のそんな第十話, Iyoiyo konkai no kōhan kara honkaku-teki ni "kore, nan no hanashidesu ka?" – Hen ni totsunyū suru wakedesuga (sōhaittemo konkai to tsugi no ni-kai dakedakedo) shiranaihito no tame ni mōichido setsumei shite okuto "kore, nan no hanashidesu ka?" to wa taitoru ga "kono hīrā, mendokusai" ni naru izen tsumari shōgyō rensai ni naru mae ni WEB no tōkō saito ni keisai sa rete ita monode dakara komikkusu ni wa shūroku sa rete inaikeredo mada yomeru hazunanode yokereba sochira mo dōzo to iitsutsu zenhan ni mo minogasenai nikumareyaku ga dete kurunode sotchi ni mo go chūmoku itadakitai to iu sono wake wa kongo mo hikitsudzuki mite itadakereba wakaru nani-ge ni daijina ibento mansai no Sonna Daijūwa)
11	"That's the Deal with Episode 11"; Transliteration: "Sonna Daijūichiwa" (Japanese: そんな第十一話)	Shunji Yoshida	Fumihiko Shimo	Ice Mugino	June 19, 2022
Officially titled "So, this is Part 2 of the "What Story Is This?" arc and I'm really glad we found out a way for Anna and Ryoko to get involved and also to fill in some time based on the fact that there's not enough manga material available but there's also a reference to that classic family anime in this episode that I think a lot of people will get even if I don't explain it but it's been a chance to think about how animators back then had to put so much care into drawing each cel by hand instead of doing it digitally like we do now which is pretty cool and that's the deal with episode 11" (『これ、なんの話ですか? 』編の第二回なわけだけれど原作の『このヒーラー、めんどくさい』の方には出てこないアンナやりょう子を活躍させる機会を作れたのは喜ばしくまた原作の分量が足りないぶんをおぎなうことができたのも大変ありがたいその一方で今回はあの国民的人気アニメのネタも出てきてこちらはもちろん説明なしでもわかる人が多いだろうけれどこの頃は今と違ってデジタルではなくセルに一枚一枚絵の具と筆で色を塗っていたんだなあと当時のスタッフが作品にそそぐ熱意や労力にふと思いを馳せるきっかけとなるのも悪くないかもしれないそんな第十一話, "Kore, nan no hanashidesu ka?" – Hen no dainikaina wakedakeredo gensaku no "kono hīrā, mendokusai" no kata ni wa detekonai An'na ya ryō-ko o katsuyaku sa seru kikai o tsukureta no wa yorokobashiku mata gensaku no bunryō ga tarinai bun o oginau koto ga dekita no mo taihen arigatai sono ippō de konkai wa ano kokumin-teki ninki anime no neta mo dete kite kochira wa mochiron setsumei nashi demo wakaru hito ga ōidaroukeredo konogoro wa ima to chigatte dejitarude wanaku seru ni hitohirahitohira enogu to fude de iro o nutte ita nda nā to tōji no sutaffu ga sakuhin ni sosogu netsui ya rōryoku ni futo omoiwohaseru kikkake to naru no mo warukunai kamo shirenai Sonna Daijūichiwa)
12	"That's the Deal with Episode 12 (Final Episode)"; Transliteration: "Sonna Daijūniwa (Saishūkai)" (Japanese: そんな第十二話（最終回）)	Nobuaki Nakanishi	Fumihiko Shimo	Nobuaki Nakanishi	June 26, 2022
Officially titled "We've reached the final episode at last and the entire staff including those on the manga side would like to thank you all for watching but because the manga doesn't yet contain a story that could be used for a final episode this is basically going to be a totally original story although we made sure to get the dwarf character designs and lines and ideas from the creator Hakko-sensei so we were able to make it feel consistent but it's also sad to reach the end at last and while we'd really like to spend more time with Carla and Alvin and the others please remember that their adventures will continue in the manga so continue to support them there but anyway thank you so much for watching and once more from the bottom of our hearts we'd like to say thank you so much and that's the deal with episode 12 (final episode)" (いよいよ最終回がやってきてここまでご視聴くださった皆さまには原作サイドもふくめスタッフ一同お礼を申しあげながらも原作で最終回に使えそうなエピソードがまだ出てきていなかったのでほぼ完全オリジナルストーリーになってそれでも原作者の丹念に発酵先生からドワーフのキャラクターデザインやセリフやアイデアをもらえたのでなんとかまとめることができてとりあえず一安心はしたもののやはりこれで終わりとなるとちょっとさびしいしカーラやアルヴィンたちともう少しつきあいたい気分も残しつつしかし原作はまだまだ続くのでぜひよろしくお願いしたくそれにしても本当にご視聴ありがとうございましたともう一度心からお礼を申しあげます本当にどうもありがとうございましたそんな第十二話（最終回）, Iyoiyo saishūkai ga yattekite koko made go shichō kudasatta minasama ni wa gensaku saido mo fukume sutaffu ichi dō orei o mōshiagenagara mo gensaku de saishūkai ni tsukae-sōna episōdo ga mada dete kite inakattanode hobo kanzen orijinarusutōrī ni natte soredemo gensaku-sha no tan'nen ni hakkō sensei kara dowāfu no kyarakutādezain ya serifu ya aidea o moraetanode nantoka matomeru koto ga dekite toriaezu hitoanshin wa shitamonono yahari kore de owari to naruto chotto sabishīshi kāra ya aruvu~in-tachi to mōsukoshi tsukiaitai kibun mo nokoshitsutsu shikashi gensaku wa madamada tsudzukunode zehi yoroshiku onegai shitaku sorenishitemo hontōni go shichō arigatōgozaimashita to mōichido kokorokara orei o mōshiagemasu hontōni dōmo arigatōgozaimashita Sonna Daijūniwa (Saishūkai))

== Reception ==
In 2020, the manga was among 50 nominees for the 6th Next Manga Awards in the web category.
