= Nobuaki Nakanishi =

Japanese anime director

Nobuaki Nakanishi (中西 伸彰, Nakanishi Nobuaki) is a Japanese anime storyboard artist and director.

== Filmography ==
- Ai no Wakakusa Monogatari 2: Director
- Bomberman Bidaman Bakugaiden: Series director
- Cardcaptor Sakura: Storyboard and episode director
- Don't Hurt Me, My Healer!: Director
- Duel Masters (movie): Unit director
- Even Though I'm a Super Timid Noble Girl, I Accepted the Bet from My Cunning Fiancé: Director
- I Shall Survive Using Potions!: Director
- Kaikan Phrase: Storyboard and episode director
- Kashimashi: Girl Meets Girl: Director, storyboard, episode director
- Koihime Musō: Director
- Lucifer and the Biscuit Hammer: Director
- Magical Circle Guru Guru: Director, storyboard
- Mangirl!: Director
- No Guns Life: Episode director
- Sumomomo Momomo: Director
- The Bush Baby: Storyboard, Episode director
- The Daichis - Earth Defence Family: Episode director
