= Sayaka Kikuchi =

Japanese voice actress

- 菊池 紗矢香
- Born: May 8 Chiba Prefecture, Japan
- Occupation: Voice actress
- Years active: 2018–present
- Agent: Clare Voice
- Known for: Warlords of Sigrdrifa as Sonoka Watarai; Combatants Will Be Dispatched! as Snow; Umamusume: Pretty Derby as Hokko Tarumae

Sayaka Kikuchi (菊池 紗矢香, Kikuchi Sayaka; born May 8) is a Japanese voice actress from Chiba Prefecture who is affiliated with Clare Voice. She is known for her roles as Sonoka Watarai in Warlords of Sigrdrifa, Snow in Combatants Will Be Dispatched! and Hokko Tarumae in Umamusume: Pretty Derby.

== Filmography ==
=== Anime ===
2018

- Goblin Slayer as Adventurer, Cowgirl's mother (episode 2), Female warrior (episode 11)

2019

- Domestic Girlfriend as Child B (episode 8), Rika
- BanG Dream! as Girl
- Persona 5: The Animation as Passerby B
- How Heavy Are the Dumbbells You Lift? as Female student (episode 8)
- We Never Learn as Child

2020

- Muhyo & Roji's Bureau of Supernatural Investigation as Ai (episodes 14–15)
- Wandering Witch: The Journey of Elaina as Salesperson (episode 7)
- Warlords of Sigrdrifa as Sonoka Watarai
- The Irregular at Magic High School: Visitor Arc as New Breed Front magician (episode 12); New Breed Front member (episode 13)

2021

- Otherside Picnic as Child (episode 3)
- Combatants Will Be Dispatched! as Snow
- I've Been Killing Slimes for 300 Years and Maxed Out My Level as Natalie
- Osamake as Penguin (episode 1)
- The Aquatope on White Sand as Child (episode 5), Ruka Suroi
- The Case Study of Vanitas as Catherine (episodes 4, 6)
- The Vampire Dies in No Time as Hiroshi Yokota

2023

- Ningen Fushin: Adventurers Who Don't Believe in Humanity Will Save the World as Curran

2024

- My Instant Death Ability Is So Overpowered as Sora Akino
- The Unwanted Undead Adventurer as Amiris
- VTuber Legend: How I Went Viral After Forgetting to Turn Off My Stream as Chami Yanagase

2025

- The Brilliant Healer's New Life in the Shadows as Loewe

=== Video games ===
2022

- Umamusume: Pretty Derby as Hokko Tarumae

2023

- Blue Archive as Minori Yasumori
