= The Eternal Fool's Words of Wisdom =

Japanese light novel series

- The Eternal Fool's Words of Wisdom: A Pawsitively Fantastic Adventure
- First light novel volume cover

悠久の愚者アズリーの、賢者のすゝめ (Yūkyū no Gusha Azurī no, Kenja no Susume)
- Genre: Fantasy
- Novel series
- Written by: Hifumi
- Published by: Shōsetsuka ni Narō
- Original run: January 9, 2015 – September 30, 2019
- Light novel
- Written by: Hifumi
- Illustrated by: Kurihito Mutō
- Published by: Earth Star Entertainment
- Imprint: Earth Star Novel
- Original run: September 15, 2015 – December 14, 2019
- Volumes: 14
- Manga
- Written by: Hifumi
- Illustrated by: Fuh Araki
- Published by: Earth Star Entertainment
- English publisher: NA: J-Novel Club
- Imprint: Earth Star Comics
- Magazine: Comic Earth Star
- Original run: April 27, 2017 – present
- Volumes: 13
- Anime television series
- Directed by: Keisuke Ōnishi
- Written by: Kurasumi Sunayama
- Music by: Yuri Habuka
- Studio: Studio Elle
- Licensed by: Crunchyroll
- Original network: Tokyo MX, BS Asahi, AT-X
- Original run: January 9, 2027 – scheduled
- icon

The Eternal Fool's Words of Wisdom: A Pawsitively Fantastic Adventure (Japanese: 悠久の愚者アズリーの、賢者のすゝめ, Hepburn: Yūkyū no Gusha Azurī no, Kenja no Susume) is a Japanese light novel series written by Hifumi and illustrated by Kurihito Mutō. It was serialized online from January 2015 to September 2019 on the user-generated novel publishing website Shōsetsuka ni Narō. It was later acquired by Earth Star Entertainment, who published fourteen volumes between September 2015 and December 2019 under their Earth Star Novel imprint. A manga adaptation with art by Fuh Araki has been serialized online via Earth Star Entertainment's Comic Earth Star manga website since April 2017 and has been collected in thirteen tankōbon volumes. An anime television series adaptation produced by Studio Elle is scheduled to premiere in January 2027.

== Plot ==
After failing his entrance exams for magic university, young Asley drank the "Ancient Elixir", a concoction he had created, and gained immortality. Asley then secluded himself for 5000 years, studying magic and sorcery. When he awoke, he had become well-versed in ancient magic and began to enjoy his second youth.

== Characters ==
Asley (アズリー, Azurī)
Voiced by: Toshiyuki Toyonaga
Pochi (ポチ)
Voiced by: Yoko Hikasa
Rina (リナ)
Voiced by: Minori Fujidera
Aileen (アイリーン, Airīn)
Voiced by: Rie Kugimiya

== Media ==
=== Light novel ===
Written by Hifumi, The Eternal Fool's Words of Wisdom: A Pawsitively Fantastic Adventure was serialized on Shōsetsuka ni Narō from January 9, 2015, to September 30, 2019. It was later acquired by Earth Star Entertainment who published fourteen volumes with illustrations by Kurihito Mutō under their Earth Star Novel imprint from September 15, 2015, to December 14, 2019.

No.	Release date	ISBN
1	September 15, 2015	978-4-8030-0788-6
2	January 15, 2016	978-4-8030-0858-6
3	May 14, 2016	978-4-8030-0910-1
4	September 15, 2016	978-4-8030-0955-2
5	December 15, 2016	978-4-8030-0979-8
6	May 15, 2017	978-4-8030-1052-7
7	November 15, 2017	978-4-8030-1129-6
8	March 15, 2018	978-4-8030-1173-9
9	June 15, 2018	978-4-8030-1202-6
10	November 15, 2018	978-4-8030-1253-8
11	February 15, 2019	978-4-8030-1273-6
12	June 15, 2019	978-4-8030-1302-3
13	November 15, 2019	978-4-8030-1341-2
14	December 14, 2019	978-4-8030-1372-6

=== Manga ===
A manga adaptation illustrated by Fuh Araki began serialization on Earth Star Entertainment's Comic Earth Star manga website on April 27, 2017. The manga's chapters have been collected in thirteen tankōbon volumes as of February 2026. The manga adaptation is licensed in English by J-Novel Club.

No.	Original release date	Original ISBN	North American release date	North American ISBN
1	November 15, 2017	978-4-8030-1127-2	May 22, 2024	978-1-7183-4268-2
2	June 12, 2018	978-4-8030-1127-2	August 28, 2024	978-1-7183-4269-9
3	February 12, 2019	978-4-8030-1267-5	December 4, 2024	978-1-7183-4270-5
4	September 12, 2019	978-4-8030-1335-1	March 12, 2025	978-1-7183-4271-2
5	May 12, 2020	978-4-8030-1416-7	June 18, 2025	978-1-7183-4272-9
6	November 12, 2020	978-4-8030-1466-2	September 10, 2025	978-1-7183-4273-6
7	June 12, 2021	978-4-8030-1527-0	December 31, 2025	978-1-7183-4274-3
8	February 10, 2022	978-4-8030-1612-3	March 25, 2026	978-1-7183-4275-0
9	March 10, 2023	978-4-8030-1758-8	June 17, 2026	978-1-7183-4276-7
10	December 13, 2023	978-4-8030-1876-9	—	—
11	October 11, 2024	978-4-8030-2020-5	—	—
12	June 12, 2025	978-4-8030-2135-6	—	—
13	February 12, 2026	978-4-8030-2263-6	—	—

=== Anime ===
An anime television series adaptation was announced on February 5, 2026. The series will be produced by Studio Elle and directed by Keisuke Ōnishi, with Kurasumi Sunayama handling series composition, Yumiko Mizuno designing the characters, and Yuri Habuka composing the music. It is set to premiere on January 9, 2027 on Tokyo MX and other networks. Crunchyroll will stream the series. The opening theme song is "321 smiling", performed by Nako Misaki and Sajou no Hana, and the ending theme song is "Mirai Vision" (未来のビジョン; lit. 'Future Vision'), performed by Arcana Project.

== Reception ==
By February 2022, the series had over a million copies in circulation.
