= Studio Elle =

Japanese animation studio

Studio elle Co., Ltd.

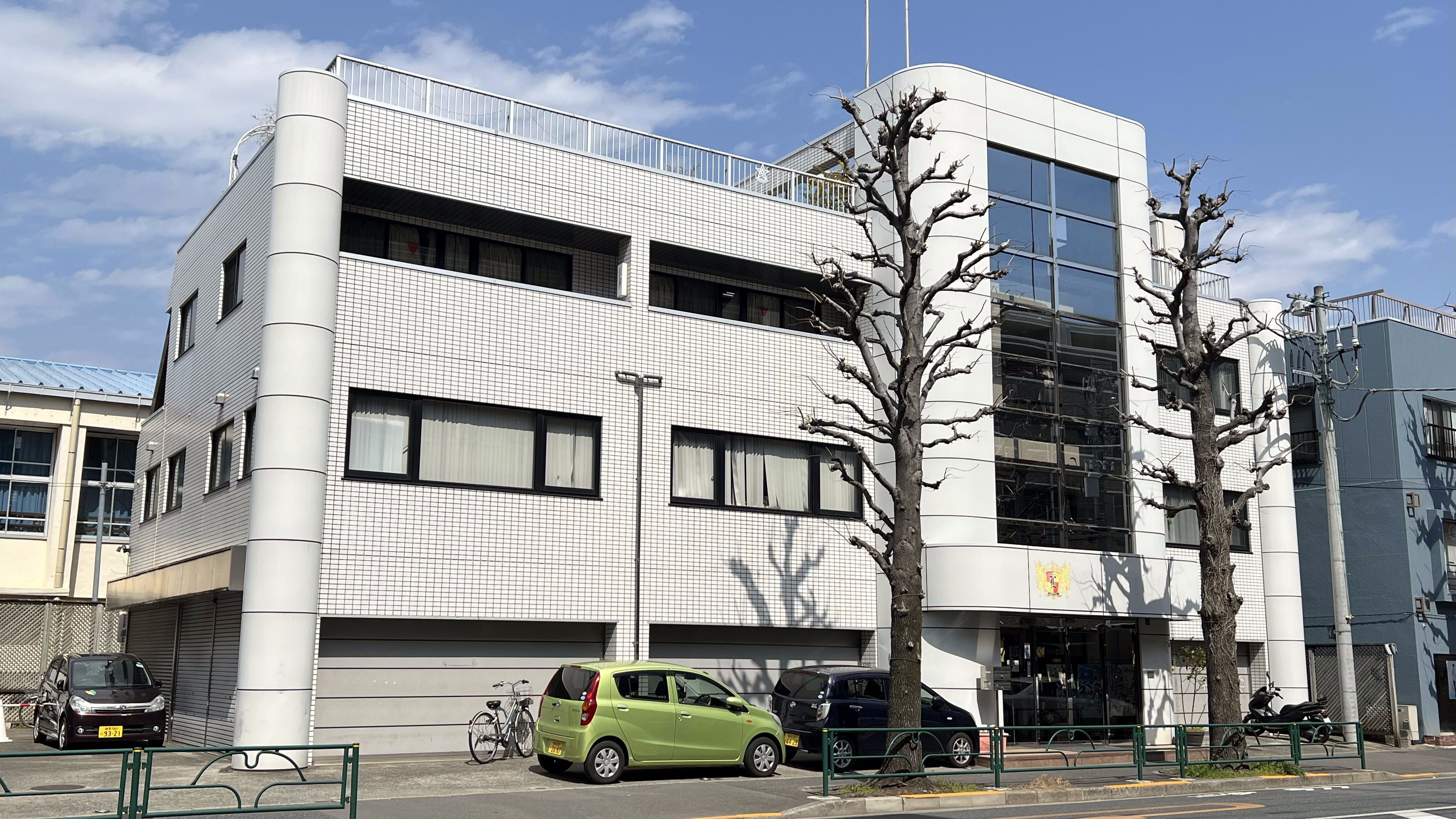
- Headquarters in Nakano, Tokyo
- Native name: 有限会社スタジオエル
- Romanized name: Yūgen-gaisha Sutajio Eru
- Type: Yūgen gaisha
- Industry: Animation studio
- Founded: 1961 (as Leo Production); 1988 (as a corporate organization)
- Founder: Leo Nishimura (as Leo Production)
- Headquarters: Kagisanomiya, Nakano, Tokyo, Japan
- Key people: Tasunori Nishimura (Note: President and CEO.); Ryouei Nishimura (Note: Senior managing director.); Tetsuya Nishimura (Note: Director and chief of the photography department.); Suguru Shakagoori (Note: Director and producer.); Masami Abe (Note: Chief of the animation department.)
- Website: studioelle.jp

Studio elle Co., Ltd. (Japanese: 有限会社スタジオエル, Hepburn: Yūgen-gaisha Sutajio Eru) is a Japanese animation studio based in Nakano, Tokyo originally founded in 1961.

== History ==
The company's predecessor, Leo Productions, founded by Leo Nishimura in 1961, was primarily involved with TV and film production. They very briefly entered the anime cel-photography business in 1970 before closing that department in 1973. In 1975, the company's name was changed to the current Studio Elle and a cel-painting department was established. In 1988, the company officially registered as a yūgen gaisha. In 1999, the company shifted all cel-painting production to digital and did the same with its photography department in 2001. In 2005, the studio opened an animation department and merged with animation studio Jec E. The different departments were located in different buildings until 2007 when Studio Elle purchased a building in Kamisaginomiya and reorganized all of its departments into it. The studio opened a 3DCG department in 2012, but it was disbanded in 2017. The company had a second merger with another animation studio, Masami Abe's Anime Spot, in 2012 and Abe subsequently became the head of Studio Elle's animation department; and in 2018 they opened an overseas department.

== Works ==
=== Television series ===
Title	Director(s)	First run start date	First run end date	Eps	Note(s)	Ref.
Gibiate	Masahiko Komino	July 15, 2020	September 30, 2020	12	Original work. Co-produced with Lunch Box.	
Summoned to Another World for a Second Time	Motoki Nakanishi	April 9, 2023	June 25, 2023	12	Based on a light novel by Kazuha Kishimoto.	
The Healer Who Was Banished From His Party, Is, in Fact, the Strongest	Keisuke Ōnishi	October 6, 2024	December 22, 2024	12	Based on a light novel by Kagekinoko.	
My Awkward Senpai	Ayumu Kotake	October 2, 2025	December 18, 2025	12	Based on a manga by Makoto Kudo.	
The Eternal Fool's Words of Wisdom	Keisuke Ōnishi	January 9, 2027	TBA	TBA	Based on a light novel by Hifumi.	
The Eccentric Doctor of the Moon Flower Kingdom	Koichiro Kuroda	TBA	TBA	TBA	Based on a manga by Tohru Himuka.	

=== Films ===
Title	Director(s)	Release date	Note(s)	Ref.
Maruhi Gekki Ukiyo-e Senichiya	Leo Nishimura	October 29, 1969	Original work. First and only work produced by Leo Productions.	
Rock'n Oyone	Akira Shigino	April 30, 2022	Original work. Official entry for the Agency of Cultural Affairs' 2022 Anime no Tane program.	
