= Combatants Will Be Dispatched! =

Japanese light novel series and its franchise

- First light novel volume cover, featuring Combat Agent 6 (left) and Snow (right)

戦闘員、派遣します！ (Sentōin, Haken Shimasu!)
- Novel series
- Written by: Hideaki Natsuki (Natsume Akatsuki)
- Published by: Shōsetsuka ni Narō
- Original run: August 19, 2012 – September 10, 2012
- Light novel
- Written by: Natsume Akatsuki
- Illustrated by: Kakao Lanthanum
- Published by: Kadokawa Shoten
- English publisher: NA: Yen Press
- Imprint: Kadokawa Sneaker Bunko
- Original run: November 1, 2017 – present
- Volumes: 7
- Manga
- Written by: Natsume Akatsuki
- Illustrated by: Masaaki Kiasa
- Published by: Media Factory
- English publisher: NA: Yen Press
- Magazine: Monthly Comic Alive
- Original run: March 27, 2018 – March 27, 2024
- Volumes: 12
- Anime television series
- Directed by: Hiroaki Akagi
- Written by: Yukie Sugawara
- Music by: Masato Koda
- Studio: J.C.Staff
- Licensed by: Crunchyroll (Note: In North America through Crunchyroll, LLC (formerly known as Funimation).); SA/SEA: Muse Communication
- Original network: AT-X, Tokyo MX, KBS, SUN, BS NTV
- Original run: April 4, 2021 – June 20, 2021
- Episodes: 12
- icon

Combatants Will Be Dispatched! (Japanese: 戦闘員、派遣します！, Hepburn: Sentōin, Haken Shimasu!) is a Japanese light novel series written by Natsume Akatsuki and illustrated by Kakao Lanthanum. Originally serialized as a web novel in Shōsetsuka ni Narō between August and September 2012, Kadokawa Shoten have published the series since November 2017 under their Kadokawa Sneaker Bunko imprint. A manga adaptation with art by Masaaki Kiasa was serialized in Media Factory's seinen manga magazine Monthly Comic Alive from March 2018 to March 2024. Both the light novel and the manga are licensed in North America by Yen Press. An anime television series adaptation produced by J.C.Staff aired from April to June 2021.

== Plot ==
Having almost completed their conquest of Earth, the evil Kisaragi Corporation has decided to expand their operations to other Earth-like planets across the universe by sending Combat Agent 6 and newly developed combat droid Alice to a fantasy-like world via an untested teleporter. Shortly after arriving, 6 and Alice find themselves drafted into the Kingdom of Grace's military. However, 6 has to collect enough "Evil Points" to help Kisaragi establish a foothold on this new planet. 6 and Alice must balance their work for Kisaragi with saving the Kingdom of Grace and its Princess from the encroaching demon army.

== Characters ==
Combat Agent 6 (戦闘員六号, Sentōin Roku-Gō; lit. ''Combatant Number Six'')
Voiced by: Yusuke Shirai (Japanese); Brendan Blaber (English)
One of the first combat agents for the Kisaragi Corporation whose real name has not been revealed. 6 serves as an advance scout for Kisaragi on the other world (chosen by dice roll), and constantly gets himself into dishonorable or lecherous situations to increase his Evil Points, but his underhanded tactics are useful in fighting against demonic opponents he encounters. He knows the Supreme Leaders of Kisaragi from their shared past.
Alice Kisaragi (キサラギ=アリス, Kisaragi Arisu)
Voiced by: Miyu Tomita (Japanese); Monica Rial (English)
The "Kisaragi Company Pretty Girl Android," Alice is a combat droid recently built by Lilith who claims to have the strength of a little girl, but she is able to wield a pump shotgun that 6 summons for her early on. Alice also claims to have a powerful self-destruct device embedded inside her that will trigger with enough damage. She often serves as the "straight man" to 6's antics.
Snow (スノウ, Sunō)
Voiced by: Sayaka Kikuchi (Japanese); Amber Lee Connors (English)
The ambitious Commander of Princess Tillis' Royal Guard who clawed her way up from the slums, primarily motivated by fortune and glory. After an incident with bringing 6 and Alice into the Kingdom, Snow is demoted and forced to serve as 6's Executive Officer. Snow has a habit of blowing her money on expensive swords with fancy names.
Rose (ロゼ, Roze)
Voiced by: Natsumi Murakami (Japanese); Kristi Rothrock (English)
A chimera in the form of a little girl, she can copy the abilities of any creature she eats. Rose treats the words of her late creator as gospel, which leads to her saying some "tacky" lines at times.
Grimm (グリム, Gurimu)
Voiced by: Minami Takahashi (Japanese); Brittney Karbowski (English)
An Archbishop of Zenarith and a slut with an awful personality (according to 6) who often falls asleep during battle. She is a dark mage, capable of inflicting curses upon her targets. However, her curses only work "maybe 80% of the time," and "the success rate drops like a rock" when she uses the same phrasing or might even affect her instead. Grimm uses a wheelchair, but only because a backfired curse made her unable to wear shoes. Being an Archbishop of Zenarith allows Grimm to be resurrected from death when an offering is made at a nearby shrine or temple.
Freezing Astaroth (氷結のアスタロト, Hyōketsu no Asutaroto)
Voiced by: Sayumi Watabe (Japanese); Mallorie Rodak (English)
One of the Supreme Leaders of Kisaragi, who has the power to encase her enemies in ice. She secretly has a crush on 6.
Flaming Belial (業火のベリアル, Gōka no Beriaru)
Voiced by: Rina Hidaka (Japanese); Molly Searcy (English)
One of the Supreme Leaders of Kisaragi with the power to create fire from her hands. Is easily embarrassed when reminded of her family. 6 accidentally revealed that her real name is Yukari.
Black Lilith (黒のリリス, Kuro no Ririsu)
Voiced by: Kaori Ishihara (Japanese); Emily Neves (English)
One of the Supreme Leaders of Kisaragi, a small girl who designs and builds high-tech devices of all kinds.
Princess Tillis (ティリス王女, Tirisu Hime) / Cristoseles Tillis Grace (クリストセレス • ティリス • グレイス, Kurisutoseresu Tirisu Gureisu)
Voiced by: Kaori Maeda (Japanese); Bryn Apprill (English)
The princess and current ruler of the Kingdom of Grace whose royal family mysteriously disappeared.
Heine (炎のハイネ, Honō no Haine)
Voiced by: Asami Seto (Japanese); Kristen McGuire (English)
A member of the Four Heavenly Kings of the Demon Army, also known as "Heine of the Flame" which she controls power over fire.
King (王様, Ōsama)
Voiced by: Takaya Hashi (Japanese); Cris George (English)
The former ruler of the Grace Kingdom who mysteriously disappeared and is the father of Princess Tillis.

== Media ==
=== Light novels ===
The first light novel volume was published on November 1, 2017, by Kadokawa Shoten under their Kadokawa Sneaker Bunko imprint. As of June 2022, seven volumes have been published. The light novel series is published in North America by Yen Press.

==== Volumes ====
No.	Original release date	Original ISBN	English release date	English ISBN
1	November 1, 2017	978-4-04-106110-7	September 3, 2019	978-1-9753-8558-3
2	May 1, 2018	978-4-04-106112-1	December 31, 2019	978-1-9753-3152-8
3	April 1, 2019	978-4-04-107556-2	April 21, 2020	978-1-9753-9902-3
4	September 1, 2019	978-4-04-107557-9	September 22, 2020	978-1-9753-1368-5
5	January 1, 2020	978-4-04-108974-3	March 9, 2021	978-1-9753-1655-6
6	September 1, 2020	978-4-04-109537-9	July 27, 2021	978-1-9753-2516-9
7	June 1, 2022	978-4-04-109538-6	October 24, 2023	978-1-9753-6766-4

=== Manga ===
A manga adaptation illustrated by Masaaki Kiasa was serialized in Media Factory's Monthly Comic Alive manga magazine from March 27, 2018, to March 27, 2024. The series has been collected in twelve tankōbon volumes. The manga series is also published in North America by Yen Press.

==== Volumes ====
No.	Original release date	Original ISBN	English release date	English ISBN
1	August 23, 2018	978-4-04-065045-6	September 24, 2019	978-1-9753-0609-0
2	March 23, 2019	978-4-04-065494-2	February 25, 2020	978-1-9753-9901-6
3	September 20, 2019	978-4-04-064027-3	October 6, 2020	978-1-9753-1365-4
4	March 23, 2020	978-4-04-064500-1	January 19, 2021	978-1-9753-2006-5
5	September 23, 2020	978-4-04-064893-4	September 28, 2021	978-1-9753-3627-1
6	March 23, 2021	978-4-04-680305-4	February 8, 2022	978-1-9753-3975-3
7	September 22, 2021	978-4-04-680734-2	October 18, 2022	978-1-9753-5020-8
8	March 23, 2022	978-4-04-681224-7	April 18, 2023	978-1-9753-6449-6
9	October 21, 2022	978-4-04-681767-9	June 18, 2024	978-1-9753-7363-4
10	March 23, 2023	978-4-04-682244-4	September 17, 2024	978-1-9753-8785-3
11	November 22, 2023	978-4-04-682839-2	March 11, 2025	978-1-9753-9821-7
12	May 23, 2024	978-4-04-683566-6	August 12, 2025	979-8-8554-1341-0

=== Anime ===
During a livestream commemorating the first anniversary of Kadokawa's "Kimirano" light novel website on March 15, 2020, it was announced that the series would receive an anime television series adaptation. The series was animated by J.C.Staff and aired from April 4 to June 20, 2021, on AT-X, Tokyo MX, KBS Kyoto, SUN, and BS-NTV. Hiroaki Akagi directed the series, with Yukie Sugawara handling the series' scripts, Sōta Suwa designing the characters, and Masato Kōda composing the series' music. Miku Itō performed the opening theme "No.6," while Miyu Tomita, Sayaka Kikuchi, Natsumi Murakami, and Minami Takahashi performed the ending theme "Home Sweet Home" as their respective characters. It ran for 12 episodes.

Funimation co-produced the series and streamed it on its website in North America and the British Isles, in Europe through Wakanim, and in Australia and New Zealand through AnimeLab. Following Sony's acquisition of Crunchyroll, the series was moved to Crunchyroll. Muse Communication has licensed the series in Southeast Asia and South Asia, and streamed it on their Muse Asia YouTube channel and Bilibili.

==== Episodes ====
No.	Title (Note: All English titles are taken from Funimation.)	Directed by	Written by	Original release date
1	"Spies Will Be Dispatched!"; Transliteration: "Kōsakuin, Haken Shimasu!" (Japanese: 工作員、派遣します！)	Makoto Sokuza	Yukie Sugawara	April 4, 2021
With Earth almost completely conquered, the Supreme Leaders of the evil Kisaragi Corporation send "Combat Agent 6" to another planet to determine if they can establish a base there and continue conquering a new world. Otherwise, they warn that 6 will be fired once they have finished their conquest of Earth. 6 reluctantly accepts the job, being paired with a combat droid in the form of a small girl named Alice. The two are then transported to a world with an Earth-like atmosphere, where 6 wants to set up a teleporter immediately and return home, but Alice warns that he'll need lots more Evil Points to establish a base before he can set up anything. After being attacked by monsters, the two manage to work their way into the Kingdom of Grace under the Commander of the Royal Guard, Snow. As they walk through the kingdom, 6 and Alice notice that there seems to be familiar technology around, such as a rusted battle tank. Snow introduces them to a large artifact that can call down rain. Alice recognizes the device and begins fixing it. However, when the device asks for a new password, 6 enters "Dick Festival," hoping to get "Evil Points" from watching the royal family get embarrassed from saying the phrase in public. Princess Tillis catches them all in the act, and decides to use the incident to make 6 and Alice work as knights for the kingdom under her command, with Snow demoted to 6's executive officer after claiming she would take responsibility for their actions.
2	"Annihilate Your Business Rivals!"; Transliteration: "Shōbaigataki o Jūrin Seyo" (Japanese: 商売仇を蹂躙せよ)	Seung Deok Kim	Yukie Sugawara	April 11, 2021
With most able-bodied soldiers fighting the demons on the front lines, Alice decides to add two strange young women to 6's group: a chimera named Rose and a wheelchair-using Archpriest of Zenarith named Grimm. The next day, 6's group watch the Grace army about to do battle with a Demon Army camp, but 6 decides to attack their supply lines instead, thinking it will be easier while Snow argues there's barely any glory in doing so. Shortly after routing the orcs from the supply lines, 6 finds himself facing off against one of the Demon Lord's "Elite Four," Heine of the Flame. With the rest of his party unable or unwilling to help out, 6 tries to avoid being scorched by Heine. Suddenly, another member of the Elite Four, Gandalkand of the Earth, lands and immediately crushes Grimm's head with his giant club. 6's group fights with Gandalkand until the Demon Lord orders him to retreat. 6 is distraught at Grimm's death, until Snow mentions that Grimm can be resurrected at a nearby church. After waiting for her revival, 6 drives Grimm through the kingdom's capital on a new wheelchair. When the two are stopped by a female guard, Grimm tries to demonstrate her curse powers on her, but is only partially successful.
3	"The Right Way to Clear a Tower!"; Transliteration: "Tadashii Tō no Kōryaku-hō" (Japanese: 正しい塔の攻略法)	Nana Fujiwara	Yukie Sugawara	April 18, 2021
After boasting of his recent success, 6 works with Alice to "induct" Rose into Kisaragi by trying to make her eat a grasshopper, though she detests bugs. 6 barely has time to rest before he's called in to resolve another crisis: the Chosen One, Tillis' brother, has been wounded by two powerful demons while assaulting Duster Tower, a mostly hollow tower with a long, spiral staircase that contains a treasure crucial to defeating the Demon Lord. After his initial plan is shot down and the Kingdom's forces decide to try a frontal assault on the tower, 6 and his unit simply wait for sunset before using a pneumatic gun to create handholds for them to climb up the side of the tower. After reaching the top, 6 kicks one of the demons off the ledge, while knocking the second unconscious by throwing several rocks at him. When the first one returns up the stairs, 6 bargains with the second demon's life in exchange for the tower and its treasure, gaining Evil Points. Despite their dishonorable actions, 6 and Alice are each awarded a large sack of gold back at the castle for their efforts.
4	"How to Defeat an Evil Leader!"; Transliteration: "Aku no Kanbu no Taoshikata" (Japanese: 悪の幹部の倒し方)	Yoshitaka Koyama	Yukie Sugawara	April 25, 2021
The Kingdom's Chief Strategist advises the General to have 6's unit perform a frontal assault on a unit of the Demon Army led by Heine, though 6 suspects the Strategist is just trying to get rid of him after insulting him so hard that he cried. Shortly after arriving at the battlefield, the Kingdom's forces notice a magical rock golem stomping towards them, and 6's unit decide to fight everyone else except for the golem, while Alice tries to acquire C4 from Kisaragi, leaving 6 himself as the golem's opponent. 6 ends up releasing his suit's limiters just in time for the C4 to arrive, and destroys the golem, but is left defenseless for three minutes when Heine herself tries to finish off 6. Finally, Grimm wakes up and hits Heine with a paralyzing curse. Just as Heine breaks free of the curse, Snow attacks her, cutting away a magic stone Heine used to amplify her powers. 6 takes advantage of the act by humiliating Heine in front of both surviving armies and gains several Evil Points. Later that night, the Strategist tries to bribe Snow into proving that 6 is a foreign spy. Snow plans to keep the money and side with 6 but overhears him talking with Alice about being a spy for Kisaragi.
5	"To Be a Hero!"; Transliteration: "Hīrō ni Naru Tame ni" (Japanese: ヒーローになるために)	Taiki Nishimura	Yukie Sugawara	May 2, 2021
Snow gets elevated back to her old position in the Royal Guard along with Rose and Grimm after 6 and Alice leave the Kingdom. After settling into their new home, 6 and Alice begin setting up a teleporter, but Alice warns it will take at least a month to stabilize the connection between the two worlds, and the Demon Lord's army will attack before then. 6 decides to get some Evil Points by flashing random women in the kingdom, but his actions earn him infamy as everyone in the castle calls him "Zipperman." 6 uses his new Evil Points to buy landmines and bury them on routes leading to the castle. However, when they go back to town, they hear that the Chosen One disappeared with one of the Elite Four he was fighting. After fearing that they accidentally ruined the prophecy, 6 and Alice plan to escape to another country when Tillis herself appears and begs them to stay behind for the final battle with the Demon Lord's army. The next day, 6 and Alice stay by Tillis side while the Demon Lord's army marches on the Kingdom, led by Heine and Gandalkand. However, multiple golems and Heine herself are delayed by the landmines.
6	"Combatants Will Be Dispatched!"; Transliteration: "Sentōin, Haken Shimasu!" (Japanese: 戦闘員、派遣します！)	Ken'ichi Nishida	Yukie Sugawara	May 9, 2021
Despite the delay, the Demon Lord's army invades the Grace capital with several soldiers and golems as Heine demands to face 6. Rose and Grimm try to buy time with their powers while Snow rushes in to meet with 6 and Alice, who are trying to escape with Tillis. After Snow's heartfelt plea, 6 decides to stay and fight off the attackers, but realizes he doesn't have enough Evil Points, leading him to pull down Snow's panties in front of himself, Tillis, and Alice. He then uses the collected points to buy a large anti-materiel rifle, using it to destroy the golems. As Heine, Gandalkand, and a small group of flyers close the distance, 6 unleashes his suit's power, combined with a summoned chainsaw blade, to tear through every attacker in the room except for a frightened Heine, to whom he offers a one-month truce. Later, Snow confesses she has feelings for 6, but he rejects her saying he only cares about having a one night stand with her, which causes her to try and kill him. As Heine and the remnants of the Demon Lord's army leave, 6 and Alice decide to stay in this world a little longer.
7	"The Con Artist Marriage Girl!"; Transliteration: "Petenshikei Konkatsu Joshi" (Japanese: ペテン師系婚活女子)	Nana Fujiwara	Kō Shigenobu	May 16, 2021
Kisaragi sends a mutant named Tiger Man to help 6 while busy with their conquest of Earth. After 6 breaks Snow's sword during a duel, Tiger Man gives her his own sword. Later, Alice wants to learn more about the fauna of this world, so she heads to a nearby forest with 6 and Snow to catalog different kinds of animals. While running away from predators, 6 encounters a blue, walking crustecean called a Mokemoke and finds a kinship with it, but Snow cuts it in half and shares the meat with the others at the tavern. At dinner, Alice voices skepticism about the magical powers she's seen on this mission, thinking that they are the result of psychic manipulation, deception, or other scientific explanations. Offended, Grimm summons a demon in front of 6 and Alice that night to prove magic is real, but Alice remains skeptical after the demon refuses to fulfill her incredible wishes before disappearing.
8	"Corrupt, Black-Hearted Knight"; Transliteration: "Haragurokei Oshoku Kishi" (Japanese: 腹黒系汚職騎士)	Taiki Nishimura	Kō Shigenobu	May 23, 2021
Tillis tries to activate the rain machine with 6's new password but finds that she can't activate it without an audience, and the King of Grace has mysteriously disappeared. Unwilling to conduct the ceremony, Tillis decides to send 6 and his unit to the nearby Kingdom of Toris to negotiate for magical water stones. 6 summons a buggy from Earth and speeds off to Toris with the rest of his party, arriving at the castle that night. Negotiations are threatened when Snow tries unsuccessfully to woo Engel, Grimm tries to curse various partygoers, and Rose eats all the food she can. Meanwhile, Alice and 6 stumble onto a mysterious capsule in a separate room, and run into Russell of the Water, one of the Demon Army's Elite Four, along with Heine. After groping Heine for several minutes, 6 discovers that Toris has secretly provided supplies to the Demon Army. However, when confronting Engel, he does not deny it. Heine and Snow then fight for Engel's favor, and 6 gets so jealous of Engel he plays an obscene prank on him. The next day, the Kingdom of Toris declares war on Grace and institutes economic sanctions unless Grace hands over 6 and Snow. Tillis demotes Snow again and orders 6's unit to acquire water nuts from the Sand King's territory.
9	"Carnivorous Female Chimera!"; Transliteration: "Nikushokukei Joshi Kimera" (Japanese: 肉食系女子キメラ)	Makoto Sokuza	Kō Shigenobu	May 30, 2021
6's unit collect water nuts from some spines in the desert only to discover that they are standing on top of the Sand King himself. Alice manages to escape the Sand King by setting the buggy to self-destruct as the party bails from the vehicle, but now they are forced to walk across the desert. Alice uses the last of 6's Evil Points to summon a large tent, but the group quickly runs low on food and water, and Grimm is incapacitated after the first day. About seven days later, 6 tries to get Evil Points from harassing Snow, but feels guilty after she falls unconscious too. Rose becomes desperate enough to try eating 6, while 6 misinterprets her words as wanting sex, until Alice clears it up. 6 then gains several Evil Points while trying to fight off a ravenous Rose throughout the night. The next day, 6 has enough Evil Points to buy a new buggy and enough food and drink for the party to return to Grace. Tillis informs 6 and Alice that Toris and the Demon Army have joined forces and are planning to attack Grace, and without water Grace won't last long. Tillis hands Alice a map to ancient ruins, and says that a couple of elite demons are searching for an ancient weapon to defeat the Sand King. Alice decides to go steal it from them.
10	"Kisaragi Leaders Will Be Livestreamed!"; Transliteration: "Kisaragi Kanbu, Haishin Shimasu!" (Japanese: キサラギ幹部、配信します！)	Tarō Kubo	Kō Shigenobu	June 6, 2021
Back on Earth, the leaders of Kisaragi hold a party with their minions to celebrate their recent victory over the heroes. During the party, Lilith secretly livestreams candid video of Astaroth and Belial across the internet, in addition to 6, Alice, and Tiger Man on the other world. Lilith earns several Evil Points and rigs the "best boss" voting in her favor before the other two girls find out and punish her. Astaroth is about to answer if she's really in love with 6 when other heroes attack the party, having found the location from Lilith's livestream.
11	"How to Make an Evil Leader Cry!"; Transliteration: "Aku no Kanbu no Nakasekata" (Japanese: 悪の幹部の泣かせ方)	Nana Fujiwara	Yukie Sugawara	June 13, 2021
While Tiger Man and Grace's Army defend against the coming invasion, 6's unit drives back into Toris territory to find the secret weapon hidden in ancient ruins. As night falls, they stumble across a camp set up by Heine and Russell. 6 decides to wait until the demons enter the ruins and fight through the traps themselves, then steal the weapon after they do all the work. Upon entering the ruins, 6 and Alice note it looks surprisingly high-tech, while Rose finds some familiar scenery. As Russell and Heine approach the weapon, 6 knocks out Russell from behind with a low blow, but uses too much force, nearly killing him. After Alice revives Russell, 6 makes him activate the weapon, which turns out to be a giant mech. However, Russell activates the mech and puts himself in the pilot seat. Heine teleports away from the scene so she can't be used as a hostage, though 6 grabs her bra at the last second. 6's unit tries to escape outside, but Russell chases them down in the mech.
12	"Strong Partner and Smart Partner!"; Transliteration: "Tsuyoi Aibō to Kashikoi Aibō" (Japanese: 強い相棒と賢い相棒)	Ken'ichi Nishida	Yukie Sugawara	June 20, 2021
Alice unlocks 6's Evil Points account and allows him to go into a negative balance to fight off the mech. As Alice needs a lot of time to build her own secret weapon to counter the mech, 6 rushes outside and spends hours fighting Russell with multiple types of weapons summoned from Earth. Just as Russell finally catches 6, Alice appears in her own giant mech: The Destroyer. Three days later, Alice tells 6 that she destroyed the enemy mech as Rose and Snow captured Russell and threw him in a dungeon. Meanwhile, Tiger Man helped the Grace Army fight off the invasion force. 6 and Alice threaten Russell into using his magic to provide water for the Kingdom of Grace by siccing a horny Tiger Man on him. Some time later, as Tillis tries to work on a peace treaty between Grace and Toris, 6 and Alice test Grimm's curse that she is unable to wear shoes by putting socks on her feet. She self-destructs moments later. Meanwhile, Heine swears to avenge her fallen comrades. Back on Earth, the Chosen One and Faustress of the Wind get into an argument in a Kisaragi office before being scolded by Belial. That night, 6 talks to Alice about his dream of conquering all the worlds and finally getting a harem.

== See also ==
- Before the Tutorial Starts: A Few Things I Can Do to Keep the Bosses Alive, another light novel series with the same illustrator
- The Healer Who Was Banished From His Party, Is, in Fact, the Strongest, another light novel series with the same illustrator
