= My Awkward Senpai =

Japanese manga series

- First tankōbon volume cover, featuring Azusa Kannawa

不器用な先輩。 (Bukiyō na Senpai)
- Genre: Romantic comedy
- Manga
- Written by: Makoto Kudo
- Published by: Square Enix
- English publisher: NA: Comikey
- Imprint: Young Gangan Comics
- Magazine: Young Gangan
- Original run: December 6, 2019 – February 6, 2026
- Volumes: 11
- Anime television series
- Directed by: Ayumu Kotake
- Produced by: Akihiro Hoshino; Naofumi Shiotani; Yutaka Suwa; Hirotaka Kaneko; You Nakamura; Soujirou Arimizu; Miho Kikuchi; Kouta Arai
- Written by: Mio Inoue
- Music by: Kōji Fujimoto
- Studio: Studio Elle
- Licensed by: Crunchyroll
- Original network: Tokyo MX, BS NTV, AT-X, MTV
- Original run: October 2, 2025 – December 18, 2025
- Episodes: 12
- icon

My Awkward Senpai (Japanese: 不器用な先輩。, Hepburn: Bukiyō na Senpai) is a Japanese manga series written and illustrated by Makoto Kudo. It initially began as a webcomic published on Kudo's Twitter account in March 2019. It was later serialized in Square Enix's seinen manga magazine Young Gangan from December 2019 to February 2026. An anime television series adaptation produced by Studio Elle aired from October to December 2025.

== Plot ==
Azusa Kannawa is an office worker at a video game development company known for her good looks and serious attitude. However, her office personality is just a façade, as in reality she is awkward around people. When she is tasked to mentor new hire Yū Kamegawa, she finds the task difficult. As time passes, the two form a relationship, with Azusa opening up more to people.

== Characters ==
Azusa Kannawa (鉄輪 梓, Kannawa Azusa)
Voiced by: Lynn
A 27-year-old office worker known at the office for her strict personality and dedication to work. However, she is actually timid, clumsy and awkward, which she hides through her serious façade. Though initially only mentoring Yu for the sake of keeping her job, Azusa slowly starts developing romantic feelings for him, which she aggressively denies every time. She is originally from Oita Prefecture.
Yū Kamegawa (亀川 侑, Kamegawa Yū)
Voiced by: Shogo Sakata
A new hire originally from Saitama Prefecture, who comes under the mentorship of Azusa. His friendly personality allows Azusa to open up and become more comfortable around others. He develops a crush on Azusa after spending time with her.
Mio Hotta (堀田 美緒, Hotta Mio)
Voiced by: Ami Maeshima
Ritsu Kankaiji (観海寺 律, Kankaiji Ritsu)
Voiced by: Mitsuki Saiga
Nashiko Akizuki (秋月ナシコ, Akizuki Nashiko)
Voiced by: Nashiko Momotsuki
Kosuke Hita (日田 孝介, Hita Kosuke)
Voiced by: Hiromu Mineta
Minori Tamana (玉名 稔, Tamana Minori)
Voiced by: Saya Hitomi
Rin Suzugaya (鈴ヶ谷 凛, Suzugaya Rin)
Voiced by: Nanami Yamashita
Sayaka Kanzaki (神崎 さやか, Kanzaki Sayaka)
Voiced by: Ai Kayano
Kaoru Hisayama (久山 薫, Hisayama Kaoru)
Voiced by: Kentarō Kumagai
Eiji Kurokawa (黒川 英治, Kurokawa Eiji)
Voiced by: Shinji Kawada
Akemi Hamawaki (浜脇 明美, Hamawaki Akemi)
Voiced by: Nanako Mori
Yuko Yamaka (山香 裕子, Yamaka Yuko)
Voiced by: Yuka Nukui
Shun Tsukahara (塚原 俊, Tsukahara Shun)
Voiced by: Kento Shiraishi
Sakura Kannawa (鉄輪 桜, Kannawa Sakura)
Voiced by: M・A・O
Azusa's mother.
Yuki Kamegawa (亀川 有希, Kamegawa Yuki)
Voiced by: Shino Shimoji
Yu's young sister.

== Media ==
=== Manga ===
Written and illustrated by Makoto Kudo, My Awkward Senpai initially began as a webcomic published on Kudo's Twitter account published on March 2, 2019. It was later serialized in Square Enix's seinen manga magazine Young Gangan from December 6, 2019, to February 6, 2026. Its chapters have been collected into eleven tankōbon volumes released from March 25, 2020, to February 25, 2026. The series is published in English by Comikey and by Square Enix through their Manga UP! Global app.

No.	Release date	ISBN
1	March 25, 2020	978-4-7575-6543-2
2	October 24, 2020	978-4-7575-6914-0
3	May 25, 2021	978-4-7575-7270-6
4	December 25, 2021	978-4-7575-7643-8
5	August 25, 2022	978-4-7575-8088-6
6	March 25, 2023	978-4-7575-8483-9
7	October 25, 2023	978-4-7575-8869-1
8	August 23, 2024	978-4-7575-9375-6
9	March 25, 2025	978-4-7575-9766-2
10	September 25, 2025	978-4-301-00074-7
11	February 25, 2026	978-4-301-00338-0

=== Anime ===
An anime television series adaptation was announced on December 16, 2024. It is produced by Studio Elle and directed by Ayumu Kotake, with series composition by Mio Inoue, character designs by Kenrō Tokuda and music composition by Kōji Fujimoto. The series aired from October 2 to December 18, 2025, on Tokyo MX and other networks. The opening theme song is "Bukiyōu na I love you" (不器用なI love you; 'The Awkward I love you'), performed by Angela, while the ending theme song is "Bukiyōu ni Kimi no Tonari" (不器用に 君のとなり; 'Awkwardly Next to You'), performed by Ami Maeshima. Crunchyroll streamed the series.

==== Episodes ====
No.	Title	Directed by (Note: Production staff information is taken from the ending credits of each episode.)	Written by	Storyboarded by	Original release date
1	"ME? THE MENTOR?!"; Transliteration: "Uchi ga Kyōikugakari!?" (Japanese: ウチが教育係！？)	Masayuki Egami	Mio Inoue	Ayumu Kotake	October 2, 2025
Azusa Kannawa has a reputation in her publicity department as being highly competent but also cold and intimidating. Her boss, Eiji, asks her to train their new employee Yu Kamegawa. While outwardly appearing calm it is revealed Azusa actually uses false confidence to conceal her poor communication skills and introverted personality. In contrast Yu is handsome, confident, sociable and charming, making her realize she has a crush on him. After a bad first day she fears she is a failure, having worried about herself instead of teaching him. The next day she is determined to invite him to lunch like her mentor Kanzaki did with her but spends so long thinking about it she misses the opportunity. Her co-worker Ritsu Kankaiji urges her to do her best. For inspiration she reads self-help books on being an effective boss. Before she can try any techniques she overhears her coworkers gossiping about her being difficult to work with, causing her to cry in front of Yu. Yu insists to the others that Azusa has a softer side she just doesn't let anyone see. Azusa is quietly grateful but fails to invite him to lunch again.
2	"I Wanna Invite My Junior to Lunch!"; Transliteration: "Kōhai o Ranchi ni Obīta Iccha!" (Japanese: 後輩をランチに誘いたいっちゃ！)	Yoshihiro Mori	Mio Inoue	Yoshihiro Mori	October 9, 2025
Azusa includes Yu on a maid café collaboration project, hoping working so closely won't make it strange when she does invite him to lunch. Later, she becomes distracted thinking about Yu and lunch and accidentally agrees to a request from her boss without listening to it. When she sees Yu only brought instant noodles she is able to invite him to lunch, claiming she doesn't want him falling ill from poor nutrition. Unfortunately, she spent so much time trying to invite him she never thought of what to talk about once they started eating. The next day she urges Yu to always ask for help if he needs it, then becomes restless when he never seems to need her help. She blames herself for making their lunch awkward and decides to invite him again. Unfortunately, he is invited by their co-workers first, who automatically assume Azusa won't be interested in joining them. Azusa ends up convinced Yu thinks she is a useless mentor. Yu stays late so Azusa decides to do the same. Yu admits he admires how everyone relies on her, so he is determined his first project will impress her. He also thanks her for lunch when everyone says she prefers to eat alone. Azusa blurts out she wanted to have lunch with him, then becomes embarrassed at the implication.
3	"I Gotta Support the Drinking Party's Organizer!"; Transliteration: "Nomikai Kanji o Sapōto Sento!" (Japanese: 飲み会幹事をサポートせんと！)	Yuki Morita	Rie Uehara	Tokorozawa Sanyaku	October 16, 2025
Azusa's boss announces a drinking party to celebrate their co-worker Yamaga getting married. Yu is asked to arrange everything but Azusa has no idea how as she always avoids parties. For a wedding gift Azusa considers cat mugs but breaks one and feels ashamed when Yu pays for it. Eventually they buy towels as a gift. Azusa wonders what sort of party Yu would want. Yu claims he doesn't drink but would go drinking with her. Azusa panics and rejects the idea, then hates herself. The next day she finds Yu bought her one of the cat mugs. The party goes well but Azusa becomes drunk. Azusa claims Yu messed up a project, giving them an excuse to leave. She apologises for being a scary mentor but Yu assures her he thinks she is very kind. He asks her again to go drinking with him and this time Azusa agrees, then passes out. The next morning she learns getting her home took so long Yu had to stay with a friend without any clean clothes. Their boss spots lipstick on Yu's shirt and assumes he has a girlfriend, making Azusa panic for a moment, until he explains it is her lipstick from helping her get into a taxi, embarrassing her immensely. Their boss regrettably asks them to go on a business trip to Okinawa during Golden Week.
4	"The Really Hot Okinawa Business Trip!"; Transliteration: "Shinken Atsui! Okinawa Shucchō!" (Japanese: しんけんあつい！沖縄出張！)	Koichiro Kuroda	Misaki Morie	Koichiro Kuroda	October 23, 2025
Azusa and Yu land in Okinawa for a sunscreen company's photo-shoot. As it is on the beach Azusa wears a swimsuit. Yu worries when the director flirts with Azusa so he deliberately interrupts but worries he upset her. At dinner there is dancing which Yu takes enthusiastic part in. Azusa is more reserved but eventually enjoys herself. Yu becomes flustered but is unsure why. Azusa visits Yu's room later with medication for his sunburn, reminding him it is unprofessional to be sunburned while working for a sun cream company. The next day they complete the photo-shoot early, so the director invites them on a group sightseeing tour. Yu notices Azusa panicking so he quickly claims they need to work on their maid café project by visiting Okinawan cafes. They enjoy the experience but Azusa worries Yu only saw it as work and might not have had fun. Azusa worries when their hotel booking is for a twin room they will have to share. Yu decides to sleep at a manga café to avoid any awkwardness. Feeling guilty, Azusa asks him to stay and even challenges him to play games together. Yu worries he only causes problems for Azusa, especially when she claims she had an excellent relationship with her own mentor. They return home the next day and Yu realises he had a lot of fun.
5	"It's All the Typhoon's Fault!"; Transliteration: "Zenbu Taifū no Sei Tcha" (Japanese: ぜんぶ台風のせいっちゃ)	Yoshihiro Mori	Mio Inoue	Takaaki Ishiyama	October 30, 2025
A typhoon hits Japan but Azusa decides to go to work to set a good example for Yu then send him home early like a good mentor. On arriving they find they are the only ones in the office. They try to leave for a meeting but discover Azusa forgot her umbrella. Sharing Yu's umbrella Azusa panics at how close they are. Yu leads the meeting perfectly so Azusa is determined to send him home early. They return to the office where Azusa tries to hang up his jacket, only to end up wearing it and acting silly, unaware he was watching. Yu realises Azusa is scared of thunder so he distracts her. Azusa asks him to collect documents from the Sales team then go home early. Yu ends up meeting his friend Tsukahara in the Sales office who asks for his help. Azusa is upset Yu will end up working overtime doing another department's work, so she scolds Tsukahara for inconveniencing her trainee. Yu is grateful and offers to share an umbrella to the train station. Azusa realises Yu is actually quite manly. Getting off the train near her apartment Azusa is surprised Yu makes her take his umbrella, so she insists he take her towel. Azusa is glad she will be working remotely the next day. Yu decides to properly wash Azusa's towel before returning it.
6	"A Yukata Is the Norm for Fireworks Festivals"; Transliteration: "Hanabi Taikaitchi, Yukatayaro ne" (Japanese: 花火大会っち、浴衣やろね)	Yuki Morita	Mio Inoue	Shinpei Nagai	November 6, 2025
Azusa decides to ask Yu for drinks but finds he has already been invited to a fireworks festival by his fellow trainees, including Hotta. Yu and Hotta also invite Azusa, who decides to wear a yukata. Hotta is inspired to wear her own yukata as well. The other trainees are nervous to socialise with Azusa due to her scary reputation. As the festival is busy the group splits up; Azusa going with Yu and Hotta. Azusa is intrigued to see Yu talk casually with another person but suddenly begins to feel like an intruder on their personal time, so while they are distracted she wanders off on her own feeling depressed. She becomes lost, breaks the strap of her sandal and can't find her way back as her phone has died. Hotta finds her and explains to Yu about the broken sandal. Azusa is surprised Hotta admires her but Hotta explains all Yu ever does is praise her as a mentor. Yu appears, worried about her, and manages to repair her sandal. With the fireworks starting Azusa wonders if she would have been able to tell Yu how she felt if she was his equal and not his mentor.
7	"Mom's Comin' to Visit!"; Transliteration: "Okāsan ga Kurucchi!" (Japanese: お母さんが来るっち！)	Koichiro Kuroda	Misaki Morie	Koichiro Kuroda	November 13, 2025
Yu notices Azusa's dialect sometimes slips out around him. Azusa notices Yu is close with his parents who live in Saitama, whereas her own parents live far away in Kyushu. After work she and Yu encounter each other grocery shopping and feel awkward as they are surrounded by couples. Yu claims having someone to cook with would be nice, making Azusa feel guilty since she usually buys pre-made bento. Azusa's mother calls, mentioning babies and arranged marriages, so Azusa claims she has a boyfriend. She realises Yu heard her and reverts to her Kyushu dialect in a panic, then panics even more after realising she speaks it so often Yu has started to understand some of it. Her mother calls again, revealing she is in town and wants to meet her boyfriend. Yu realises he is happy Azusa doesn't have a boyfriend and impulsively offers to be her fake boyfriend for her mother. They meet her mother, Sakura, surprising Yu at how young she looks. Azusa steps out for a phone call, during which Sakura reveals Azusa has always struggled socially, worrying her she will be alone forever. After dinner Sakura secretly tells Yu it is obvious they are not really dating, but the fact Azusa sometimes talks to him in Kyushu dialect means she must trust him a lot.
8	"I'm gonna be a maid!" Transliteration: "Uchi, Meido ni Naru Ken!" (Japanese: ウチ、メイドになるけん！)	Masayuki Egami	Rie Uehara	Kon Takano	November 20, 2025
Kamegawa's maid café project nears completion and Azusa is drawn to the maid outfits, wondering if Yu likes that sort of thing. On opening day Azusa and Hotta find Yu being yelled at by the client as the merchandise delivery was late so the shelves haven't been stocked yet. Azusa is forced to scold Yu for not ordering the merchandise earlier but also feels guilty as it was an issue she could have pointed out beforehand. Three waitresses call in sick so Azusa steps in as a maid but messes up repeatedly as she has no waitressing experience, whereas Hotta manages perfectly. Yu worries Azusa is pushing herself too hard but Hotta assures him Azusa just wants his first project to be a success. Azusa passes out during the stage performance, forcing Hotta to replace her. Azusa is disappointed she wasn't of any real help. Yu reveals everything he is hopeless at, making Azusa feel better. Back inside she finds Hotta struggling with a difficult customer, so Azusa approaches him angrily, though this turns out to be what the masochistic customer wanted the whole time. More waitresses finally arrive and the client is thrilled the first day was a success. Yu admits Azusa makes a bad maid as her personality is more suitable for a Master role. Hotta insists on taking them drinking to celebrate.
9	"Then, Why Can't I Stop Thinkin' 'Bout It?"; Transliteration: "Nashite, Kogeki ni Narun?" (Japanese: なして、こげ気になるん？)	Yoshihiro Mori	Misaki Morie	Yoshihiro Mori	November 27, 2025
Kankaiji notices Yu and Azusa seem unusually close. Azusa tries to go clothes shopping but struggles with talking to the employees. Yu volunteers to chat with the employees so Azusa can shop. Afterwards Azusa notices Yu meeting another woman. Kankaiji and Hotta notice Azusa is visibly depressed so Hotta invites her and Yu to a spa. Yu notices Kankaiji talking with Azusa and worries she might be interested in him. Kankaiji easily tricks Yu into admitting he thinks Azusa is cute, making Yu panic. Hotta relaxes in the sauna but Azusa keeps thinking about Yu with the other woman. Yu also worries about Kankaiji. Walking together, they both almost ask the other about the other woman/Kankaiji, but decide not to. Deciding to intervene, Kankaiji insinuates to Yu that he has a crush on Azusa. Later, while drinking Azusa admits she likes having Yu as a junior, but Yu blurts out he doesn't want to be her junior forever, which she drunkenly misinterprets as criticism of her mentoring, making her cry. Later, having sobered up, Yu realizes Kankaiji is actually a mischievous woman who wanted to find out how Yu really felt. Yu returns home where the other woman is in his apartment in her underwear.
10	"I'm Gonna Visit My Junior!"; Transliteration: "Kōhai no o Mimai Ikuccha" (Japanese: 後輩のお見舞い行くっちゃ)	Masayuki Egami	Rie Uehara	Akihiro Saito	December 4, 2025
Yu phones in sick so Kankaiji and Hotta convince Azusa to check on Yu at his home. Outside his apartment she encounters the woman who is actually Yu's sister Yuki. Against Yu's objections Azusa and Yuki team up to make him an apple bunny and rice porridge. Yu realizes Azusa has been practizing cooking, something he mentioned to her before. Sensing Yu likes Azusa Yuki embarrasses him by showing off his baby pictures then subtly goes shopping to leave them alone. Azusa realises she knows almost nothing personal about him. Azusa accidentally blurts out that thinking he had a girlfriend made her feel strange, then feels even stranger having admitted it out loud. Yu makes coffee and Azusa sees he still has the cat mug from Yamaga's wedding. She admits she always struggled to socialise but was forced to get over it when she became his mentor, even though she keeps messing up. Yu grows sicker so she sends him to bed. She ends up watching him sleep but accidentally falls asleep next to him holding his hand. Luckily, they wake up before Yuki returns and she ends up admitting she wants to know more about him. Yu suggests they become friends so that spending time together doesn't feel strange.
11	"We're Gonna Celebrate Yer Birthday to the Fullest!"; Transliteration: "Tanjōbi, Shinken Oiwai Surukenne!" (Japanese: 誕生日、しんけんお祝いするけんね！)	Naoyoshi Kusaka	Misaki Morie	Shinpei Nagai	December 11, 2025
Azusa wants to celebrate Yu's birthday so Hotta and Kankaiji suggest adding him to their monthly office birthday party; for all employees whose birthday is during that month. Hotta and Kankaiji secretly wish Azusa and Yu would just date already but accept it is probably going to take a while. Azusa cryptically asks Yu what gifts men like from women, so Yu claims gloves for the cold weather. After much agonising Azusa chooses a pair of gloves herself. Yuki is disappointed Yu didn't invite Azusa on a birthday date. People in other departments are surprised Azusa suddenly taking an interest in the party and wonder what caused it. Azusa notices the party is also for Usa; her and Kankaiji's senior, so she makes sure her favourite foods are being served. Azusa accidentally ruins the birthday sign and stays late to paint a new one. Yu catches her by accident and ends up helping repair the old sign instead. Everyone notices the party is far grander than usual, and many claim it was the extra effort put in by Azusa. Hamawaki is irritated by Azusa offering to help with everything and accidentally causes a pile of boxes to collapse. Azusa pushes her out of the way but is hurt, so Yu scolds her for working too much. Hamawaki apologises for her behaviour. Azusa manages to give him the gloves and Yu suddenly admits his feelings for her are more than friendship.
12	"I Really Thought About It, Ya Know?!"; Transliteration: "Uchi, Shinken Kangae Taccha Kedo!?" (Japanese: ウチ、しんけん考えたっちゃけど!?)	Ayumu Kotake & Koichiro Kuroda	Mio Inoue	Ayumu Kotake	December 18, 2025
Azusa interprets this to mean their relationship as trainee and mentor. Later, drinking with Hotta, Azusa admits Yu was probably confessing to her. Hotta tells her Yu's feelings have been obvious for some time now, though his confession was probably a spur-of-the-moment impulse. Yu, drinking with Kankaiji, claims he wasn't aiming for a full confession, he just wanted to suggest the possibility. Kankaiji points out Azusa's personality makes it difficult for her to believe anyone could like her, so he will need a different approach if he wants to stop just being her trainee. Hotta spends all night preparing Azusa to talk to Yu, but the next morning she avoids him. The whole office notices them acting strangely and Yu eventually apologises for what he said. Azusa is confused by his apology, but then she becomes angry, and finally yells at him for causing her so much stress. She then demands they enter a temporary relationship for three months to see if it works out, and runs away. Hotta and Kankaiji are thrilled some progress has been made and remind Azusa to enjoy upcoming three months without overthinking it. For their first date the pair attends a ramen restaurant and plans to go to lots of new places for their three months together.

=== Other ===
In commemoration of the releases of volumes 3 and 4, the series had two cosplay collaborations with the model Nashiko Momotsuki dressed-up as main character Azusa Kannawa in 2021.

== Reception ==
The series was ranked fifth at the sixth Next Manga Awards in the print category. Critical reception to both the manga and the anime were mixed.
