= The Healer Who Was Banished From His Party, Is, in Fact, the Strongest =

Japanese light novel series

- First light novel volume cover

パーティーから追放されたその治癒師、実は最強につき (Pātī kara Tsuihō Sareta Sono Chiyushi, Jitsu wa Saikyō ni Tsuki)
- Genre: Fantasy
- Novel series
- Written by: Kagekinoko
- Published by: Shōsetsuka ni Narō
- Original run: May 30, 2018 – present
- Light novel
- Written by: Kagekinoko
- Illustrated by: Kakao Lanthanum
- Published by: Futabasha
- Imprint: M Novels
- Original run: January 30, 2019 – present
- Volumes: 5
- Manga
- Written by: Kagekinoko
- Illustrated by: Miwa Narumi
- Published by: Futabasha
- English publisher: NA: Manga Mirai
- Imprint: Monster Comics
- Magazine: Gaugau Monster
- Original run: February 28, 2020 – present
- Volumes: 10
- Anime television series
- Directed by: Keisuke Ōnishi
- Produced by: Takashi Murakami; Kouji Sawahata; Masaki Ishii; Fumihiro Ozawa; Kouichirou Imamura; Yuusuke Oonuki; Masayuki Hayashi
- Written by: Kurasumi Sunayama
- Music by: Naoki Tani; Tatsuya Yano
- Studio: Studio Elle
- Licensed by: Crunchyroll (streaming); SEA: Medialink
- Original network: ANN (ABC TV, TV Asahi); BS12 TwellV, AT-X
- Original run: October 6, 2024 – December 22, 2024
- Episodes: 12

The Healer Who Was Banished From His Party, Is, in Fact, the Strongest (Note: Japanese: パーティーから追放されたその治癒師、実は最強につき, Hepburn: Pātī kara Tsuihō Sareta Sono Chiyushi, Jitsu wa Saikyō ni Tsuki; "The Healer Who was Banished From His Party is Actually the Strongest") is a Japanese light novel series written by Kagekinoko and illustrated by Kakao Lanthanum. It began serialization online in May 2018 on the user-generated novel publishing website Shōsetsuka ni Narō. It was later acquired by Futabasha, who have published five volumes since January 2019 under their M Novels imprint. A manga adaptation with art by Miwa Narumi has been serialized online via Futabasha's Gaugau Monster website since February 2020 and has been collected in ten tankōbon volumes. An anime television series adaptation produced by Studio Elle aired from October to December 2024.

== Premise ==
Two centuries have passed since a hero defeated the evil Jaryu and saved the world. In one of the many dungeon cities, Raust, a healer, is unjustly kicked out of his party for being too weak. Scorned by other Adventurers because of his new reputation as an "incompetent", he is unable to form or join a new adventuring party and struggles to find his place. Amidst despair he meets martial artist Narusena who immediately invites him to form a new party together. Since Raust does have experience and a great many other hidden talents, he agrees, and with a fresh start and renewed motivation the two begin their journey to greatness.

== Characters ==
Raust (ラウスト, Rausuto)
Voiced by: Kensho Ono
Narsena (ナルセーナ, Narusēna)
Voiced by: Kaori Maeda
Margulus (マルグルス, Marugurusu)
Voiced by: Shun'ichi Toki
Saberia (サーベリア, Sāberia)
Voiced by: Marie Hashimoto
Armia (アーミア, Āmia)
Voiced by: Hina Tachibana
Lyra (ライラ, Raira)
Voiced by: Ayaka Asai
Hansam (ハンザム, Hanzamu)
Voiced by: Toshiya Miyata
Sieg (ジーク, Jīku)
Voiced by: Yūichirō Umehara
Amherst (アマースト, Amāsuto)
Voiced by: Rie Hikisaka
Mist (ミスト, Misuto)
Voiced by: Hiroshi Iwasaki
Ralma (ラルマ, Raruma)
Voiced by: Yukari Tamura
Ronaldo (ロナウド, Ronaudo)
Voiced by: Shin-ichiro Miki

== Media ==
=== Light novel ===
Written by Kagekinoko, The Healer Who Was Banished From His Party, Is, in Fact, the Strongest began serialization on the user-generated novel publishing website Shōsetsuka ni Narō on May 30, 2018. It was later acquired by Futabasha who began publishing the series with illustrations by Kakao Lanthanum under their M Novels light novel imprint on January 30, 2019. Five volumes (including a volume published digital-only) have been released as of September 2024.

No.	Release date	ISBN
1	January 30, 2019	978-4-575-24148-8
2	June 28, 2019	978-4-575-24187-7
3	January 30, 2020	978-4-575-24246-1
4	August 31, 2020	978-4-575-24319-2
5	September 30, 2024 (ebook)	—

=== Manga ===
A manga adaptation illustrated by Miwa Narumi began serialization on Futabasha's Gaugau Monster website on February 28, 2020. The manga's chapters have been collected into ten tankōbon volumes as of April 2025. The manga adaptation is published digitally in English on NTT Docomo's Manga Mirai website.

No.	Release date	ISBN
1	June 15, 2020	978-4-575-41128-7
2	December 15, 2020	978-4-575-41185-0
3	June 15, 2021	978-4-575-41252-9
4	December 15, 2021	978-4-575-41335-9
5	June 15, 2022	978-4-575-41441-7
6	December 28, 2022	978-4-575-41559-9
7	June 30, 2023	978-4-575-41678-7
8	December 28, 2023	978-4-575-41793-7
9	September 30, 2024	978-4-575-41980-1
10	April 30, 2025	978-4-575-42114-9

=== Anime ===
An anime television series adaptation was announced on January 26, 2024. It is produced by Studio Elle and directed by Keisuke Ōnishi, with Kurasumi Sunayama writing series scripts, Yumiko Mizuno designing the characters, and Naoki Tani and Tatsuya Yano composing the music. The series aired from October 6 to December 22, 2024, on the Animazing!!! programming block on all ANN affiliates, including ABC and TV Asahi. (Note: ABC and TV Asahi listed the series premiere on October 5, 2024, at 26:00, which is effectively October 6 at 2:00 a.m. JST.) The opening theme song is "Saikyō? Saikō! Brave My Heart" (最強？最高！Brave My Heart; The Strongest? The Best! Brave My Heart), performed by Hina Tachibana, while the ending theme song is "Only", performed by Sizuk. Crunchyroll streamed the series. Medialink licensed the series in Southeast Asia for streaming on Ani-One Asia's YouTube channel.

==== Episodes ====
No.	Title	Directed by	Storyboarded by	Original release date
1	"Regarding Their Meeting, Which Was, in Fact, a Reunion"; Transliteration: "Sono Deai, Jitsu wa Saikai ni Tsuki" (Japanese: その出会い、実は再会につき)	Keisuke Ōnishi	Keisuke Ōnishi	October 6, 2024
As a child Narsena is attacked by monsters but is rescued by the Healer Raust. Narsena trains as a Martial Artist and years later tracks down Raust to form an adventurer party with him, even though he does not recognise her. Guild secretary Amherst tries to dissuade her as Raust is a notoriously poor healer and was kicked from the party Blades of Lightning for incompetence. Regardless, Narsena insists Raust is the only one she will partner with. Raust explains the Mardat City Labyrinth has never been conquered so exploring it is still a good way to make money. Narsena proves an excellent fighter, as does Raust who kills a high level orc with only his dagger. Amherst is certain the orc being on the wrong floor is a sign something is happening deeper inside the labyrinth. After receiving payment for the orc Raust realises Blades of Lightning had been stealing most of his earnings. Guild Manager Hanzum takes an interest in Raust and Narsena. They lodge at a tavern run by Mary and her daughter Sheila. Narsena is disappointed Raust does not recognise her. She is also confused why the entire city treats Raust as useless when he is clearly skilled.
2	"Regarding the Banishment, Which Was, in Fact, the Start of a New Voyage"; Transliteration: "Sono Tsuihō, Jitsu wa Aratanaru Tabidachi ni Tsuki" (Japanese: その追放、実は新たなる旅立ちにつき)	Yuki Morita	Keisuke Ōnishi	October 13, 2024
Raust dreams about Blades of Lightning's last quest to kill a Hydra, which failed due to poor teamwork and party leader Margulus running away. They blamed Raust, banished him and spread rumours of his incompetence. This had followed the death of his original party when they attempted to use him as live bait, only to be killed themselves. After their deaths was when he rescued Narsena. He found people to mentor him and gained other skills, eventually being hired by Blades of Lightning. He and Narsena head to a deeper level of the labyrinth where Narsena proves capable of using Prana; a type of spirit energy. To treat her injuries Raust uses a magic tool to enhance his basic healing. Narsena is fascinated by stone towers around the city, which have seemingly no purpose as even the builders paid to construct them were not told what they were for. Resting for the evening Narsena is angry at herself for still not asking to share the same room. Margulus hires a new healer, Lyra, determined to go back and slay the Hydra. Hanzum reports on Narsena to a shadowy figure who calls her the Sleeping Princess. He orders Hanzum to get rid of Raust.
3	"Regarding the Mage, Who Is, In Fact, A Kind Soul"; Transliteration: "Sono Mahō Tsukai, Jitsu wa Kokoro Yasashiki Hito ni Tsuki" (Japanese: その魔法使い、実は心優しきひとにつき)	Masayuki Egami	Kon Takano	October 20, 2024
Lyra is baffled at Margulus' claim Raust cut off one of the Hydra's heads, since Healers are not supposed to be fighters. Raust and Narsena begin earning a lot of money, so Amherst suggests renting a house. Blades of Lightning fail to kill the Hydra and this time are severely injured. Margulus grudgingly admits Raust was actually useful, so he goes and demands Raust re-join them. However, he is humiliated when Raust turns him down and accidentally blurts out the truth about Raust's usefulness and underpaying him. Still determined to defeat the Hydra Margulus impulsively hires Shig, a swordsman more skilled than he is. The Blades Sorceress Armia and Lyra approach Raust privately to beg his help as Margulus is likely to get someone killed the next time. She also apologises for how she treated Raust since she was too scared of Marguluis and Saberia to stand up to them. She is also too loyal to leave, while Lyra feels too protective of Armia to leave either. Lyra suspects Shig is someone she knows called Sieg. Shig denies all knowledge of this so Lyra chooses not to reveal his secret. Raust and Narsena return to the labyrinth while the Blades go after the Hydra again.
4	"Regarding the Rescue, Which Is, in Fact, a Farewell"; Transliteration: "Sono Kyūen, Jitsu wa Kestsubestu no Tame ni Tsuki" (Japanese: その救援、実は決別のためにつき)	Koichiro Kuroda	Koichiro Kuroda	October 27, 2024
Narsena asks to hunt monsters in the nearby wetlands. Meanwhile, while fighting the Hydra, Armia is injured, and the Hydra begins absorbing mana from the environment, which is typically found only in the deepest parts of the labyrinth. This causes it to evolve into a more powerful form. Margulus' sword breaks against the Hydra's scales. Raust suddenly appears and saves them. Lyra is astounded when Raust uses advanced healing magic on Armia, which Margulus and Saberia were too ignorant to recognise. The Hydra knocks Raust unconscious, but Raust activates an unnatural power and severs the Hydra's heads, killing it. Margulus attempts to unfairly distribute the reward and even suggests selling Armia to a perverted noble he knows. Shig reveals that he is actually Sieg, an adventurer from the Royal City Guild. Using his authority, he decides to expel Margulus and Saberia from the guild and have them imprisoned for engaging in illegal slavery. Raust asks for leniency, so Sieg decides Margulus and Saberia can remain adventurers, but under much closer scrutiny, and they are never to set foot in Mardat City again. Sieg chooses to stay in Mardat for a while to monitor the strange goings-on with the labyrinth and its monsters, especially Raust. To maintain appearances, Sieg forms a party with Lyra and Armia.
5	"Regarding the Meddling, Which Is, in Fact, a Reason for Concern"; Transliteration: "Sono Osekkai, Jitsu wa Fuan no Tane ni Tsuki" (Japanese: そのおせっかい、実は不安の種につき)	Yoshihiro Mori	Yoshihiro Mori	November 3, 2024
Marnell, another party leader, apologises to Raust on behalf of every adventurer in Mardat, since they all knew what kind of man Margulus was. Selling the Hydra's magic stone Amherst reveals because this one evolved it is more valuable. The Hydra evolving is also further evidence of something happening in the labyrinth. Hanzum chooses to ignore this and even threatens Raust. Amherst is frustrated by Hanzum, who runs the guild on behalf of guild master Mist, said to be so old he no longer leaves his room. Raust decides to take Narsena on a quest to slay a Phoenix with Sieg, Lyra and Armia. Narsena is confronted by Ralma, an adventurer sent by Narsena's father to keep an eye on her. Coincidentally, Ralma is also Raust's former instructor. Narsena fears Ralma will tell Raust the truth – that she kept tabs on Raust, and once Blades of Lightning banished him, she ran away from home to meet him. Ralma sees nothing to be worried about and agrees Narsena can keep adventuring. Privately, she tells Narsena Raust is a very different man than he used to be, and believes he changed because of Narsena. Narsena and Raust set off on their quest. Ralma begins her real job in Mardat, investigating Mist.
6	"Regarding the Quest, Which Is, in Fact, the Start of a Comeback"; Transliteration: "Sono Kuesuto, Jitsu wa Saiki no Itoguchi ni Tsuki" (Japanese: そのクエスト、実は再起の糸口につき)	Naoyoshi Kusaka	Dojagagen	November 10, 2024
In the labyrinth Raust explains the Phoenix is blocking the way to an unexplored area, which is sure to be full of treasure no one has looted yet. The Phoenix hovers up by the ceiling. Ralma demands to see Mist but Hanzum speaks to her instead. Ralma demands information about the stone tower, the adventurers Hanzum hired who are little better than thugs, and his habit of banishing real adventurers. Ralma believes Hanzum is preparing for a Labyrinth Rampage, though Hanzum claims ignorance. Like the Hydra, the Phoenix begins absorbing mana from the environment and evolves. Raust is baffled as evolution is already rare, so two monsters evolving within days of each other is unheard of. Ralma examines the tower and finds it has strange magical properties. Armia injures the Phoenix using ice magic, knocking it to the floor where Narsena and Raust kill it. Lyra and Sieg are disappointed Raust did not resort to his unusual powers, about which they remain suspicious. That night Ralma becomes drunk and reveals to everyone that Narsena is daughter to Earl Analestria. This causes Raust to realise Narsena is the girl he rescued. Hanzum reports the Phoenix' evolution to Mist, and about Ralma. Mist appears happy at this, revealing Ralma was once his student.
7	"Regarding the Crossing of Paths, Which Was, in Fact, a Fateful Encounter"; Transliteration: "Sono Surechigai, Jitsu wa Meguriai ni Tsuki" (Japanese: そのすれ違い、実は巡り逢いにつき)	Masayuki Egami	Royden Shimazu	November 17, 2024
Narsena is shocked when they sell the evolved Phoenix' magic stone for so much money Amherst must use gold coins. Narsena hopes to purchase a house for her and Raust. Raust insists the money be saved. Plus, since they are now in Sieg's party they cannot make big decisions that only affect themselves. Narsena confides in Lyra her disappointment at Raust refusing the house, though Lyra is certain Raust is just bad at expressing his feelings. Raust confides in Sieg who suspects Raust has feelings for Narsena. In turn, Narsena and Raust realise Lyra and Sieg are in love. Amherst investigates Narsena for Raust and discovers Earl Analestria forbade her from adventuring, but one day Narsena woke up with her hair magically changed to blue and the Earl suddenly allowed Narsena to become an adventurer. Narsena convinces Lyra to confess to Sieg. Sieg asks for time to think, which Lyra considers a good sign. Raust asks Narsena to accompany him the next day for something important. Meanwhile, a storyteller entertains children with the legend of an evil dragon sleeping in the labyrinth. Every 200 years it awakens and battles a hero before being defeated by the Sleeping Princess, a blue haired woman who must sacrifice herself to put the dragon to sleep for another 200 years, indicating that Narsena is next incarnation of the Sleeping Princess.
8	"Regarding the Man, Who Was, in Fact, an Old Friend"; Transliteration: "Sono Otoko, Jitsu wa Mukashinajimi ni Tsuki" (Japanese: その男、実は昔なじみにつき)	Yuki Morita	Kon Takano	November 24, 2024
In the labyrinth a party encounters orcs, so they sacrifice their youngest member, Keith. Narsena is stressed waiting for Raust to talk to her. Keith appears severely injured so Raust has Keith's party exiled. Hanzum is furious he did not let guild leaders handle it. Other adventurers argue if Hanzum actually did his job the abuse of labyrinth orphans would not happen. Hanzum explains to Raust there is no practical way to protect orphans since adventuring is dangerous, and the incompetent always die. He reveals a scar on his arm, causing Raust to realise Hanzum is Nogzem, an orphan from Raust's first party many years ago. When the party encountered goblins Raust and Nogzem were sacrificed to them, only to escape while the goblins killed the other party members. Eventually, Nogzem changed his name to become Mist's subordinate. He once again warns Raust to leave the city and take Narsena with him. Amherst explains to Raust many employees are dissatisfied by Mist and Hanzum, so she asks him to start fixing things in secret, starting with exiling more criminal adventurers and exterminating monsters along the main road. Sieg and Narsena start training the orphans in proper combat. A letter arrives for Mist from the royal Prime Minister reiterating the importance of monitoring Narsena. Hanzum is confused, until Mist explains the story of the evil dragon and Narsena's role as the Sleeping Princess.
9	"Regarding the Master, Who Was, in Fact, the Apprentice"; Transliteration: "Sono Shishō, Jitsu wa Deshi ni Tsuki" (Japanese: その師匠、実は弟子につき)	Kōichirō Kuroda	Kōichirō Kuroda	December 1, 2024 (Note: This episode aired at 2:30 a.m. JST, 30 minutes after the original air time on ABC Television.)
An earthquake strikes the area, and hobgoblins manage to reach Mardat. They are dispatched by Raust and his party but are shocked to find the hobgoblins speaking the human language. An even larger goblin army appears from the labyrinth, causing havoc in Mardat as Hanzum authorises bounties to be paid in advance, only for many adventurers to take the money then run. Raust realises Hanzum must have been planning for this for months. Amherst reveals they are experiencing a Labyrinth Uprising, where due to excessive amounts of mana a labyrinth will overproduce monsters to get rid of that mana, so many they spill out and attack cities. At Ralma's urging Raust organises the defence of Mardat with the remaining adventurers and citizens. In the middle of the battle, they are suddenly joined by Ronaldo, a high-level adventurer who in the past had taught Narsena, Raust and even Sieg how to fight with a sword. Hanzum appears and fetches Ralma, Raust and Narsena to see Mist in person. There, it is revealed Mist was once Ralma's master and is also the last known elf still alive.
10	"Regarding the Magician, Who Was, in Fact, a Two-Faced Liar"; Transliteration: "Sono Majutsu-shi, Jitsu wa Kuwasemono ni Tsuki" (Japanese: その魔術師、実は食わせ者につき)	Yoshihiro Mori	Yoshihiro Mori	December 8, 2024 (Note: This episode aired at 3:00 a.m. JST, 1 hour after the original air time on ABC TV and TV Asahi.)
Mist is revealed to be 600 years old and the greatest magician alive. He admits to ordering Hanzum to drive good adventurers away from Mardat and replace them with bad adventurers, so that when the Uprising occurred, only they would die. He chose to do this because the one man in the Royal Capital who controls all guilds in the country ordered him to hide the Uprising so as not to panic the entire country. Mist reveals that the stone towers around the city were designed to be powered by Ralma's fire magic. In exchange for this Mist and Hanzum plan to teleport into the labyrinth and kill the labyrinth master. This will cut off the mana fuelling the Uprising. Ralma agrees, even though the effort will probably kill her, but warns Raust to not trust Mist. With the towers activated Mardat is surrounded by a barrier the monsters cannot pass through. Since damage to the barrier will kill Ralma faster Raust and his friends decide to leave the barrier and kill as many monsters as possible. Ronaldo deals with a Griffin while Raust and the others kill a Fenrir. Raust is confident the barrier will hold but victory still relies on Mist defeating the Labyrinth Master. Hanzum suddenly appears from a portal and disappears with Narsena.
11	"Regarding the Uprising, Which Was, in Fact, the Beginning of Destruction"; Transliteration: "Sono Bōsō, Jitsu wa Hakai no Hajimari ni Tsuki" (Japanese: その暴走、実は破壊のはじまりにつき)	Shigeki Awai	Kōichi Ōhata	December 15, 2024
Ronaldo explains to fully awaken the dragon must eat Narsena. Mist explains the same to Narsena and that the decision to sacrifice her came from the man in charge of the guilds, the Royal Chancellor. But even this is all part of the Chancellor's plot to seize power in the name of suppressing the Uprising. Raust and his friends agree to storm the labyrinth and save Narsena. Mist teleports Hanzum and Narsena straight to the lowest floor whilst Raust and the others take the long way and eventually catch up. Mist defends his decisions and explains that the dragon actually sleeps in another dimension; it is the job of the Labyrinth Master to collect mana for the dragon so it can awaken. If they defeat the Master, the Uprising will stop, and the dragon must wait another 200 years to awaken in another labyrinth. Together they fight the Master which dies very quickly. They are confused, until an aspect of the dragon appears and impales Hanzum, threatening to kill him unless Mist sacrifices his mana to help the dragon return. Mist chooses to let Hanzum die, but his hesitation allows the dragon to seize his body anyway. Requiring still more mana the possessed Mist teleports to the surface and begins destroying Ralma's barrier. Raust and the others use Hanzum's portal to follow him to the surface.
12	"Regarding the Conclusion, Which Was, in Fact, the Start of a New Journey"; Transliteration: "Sono Ketsumatsu, Jitsu wa Aratana Tabi no Hajimari ni Tsuki" (Japanese: その結末、実は新たな旅のはじまりにつき)	Keisuke Ōnishi & Masayuki Egami	Keisuke Ōnishi	December 22, 2024
Dragon-Mist begins summoning more monsters. To take pressure off Ralma the adventurers battle the new monsters attacking the barrier. Raust and the others attack Dragon-Mist, but Raust is impaled and Lyra attempts to heal him. Hanzum urges Narsena to run to Raust in case it is the last time she sees him alive. Narsena chooses to let Dragon-Mist eat her. Despite his injury Raust activates his power, terrifying Dragon-Mist as it is neither a human power nor a God's. Raust attacks Dragon-Mist in a feral rage, worrying his friends that unless he regains control he will not be able to stop. Narsena jumps in front of him and Raust instinctively stops and returns to normal. Mist regains enough control to stop Dragon-Mist from escaping and despite it breaking their hearts Raust and Narsena stab him together. The dragon's possession is broken, returning it to sleep. Hanzum is able to say goodbye to Mist before he dies. Ralma is returned alive. Elsewhere, the Chancellor takes an interest in Raust, wondering if he might be the next hero. Hanzum retires and appoints Amherst the new Guild Master. Unsure when the dragon will awaken again Raust decides to find the next hero and asks Narsena to come with him, which she happily accepts. They depart the very next morning in secret but their friends secretly watch them leave, certain they will all meet again in some other labyrinth.

== See also ==
- Before the Tutorial Starts: A Few Things I Can Do to Keep the Bosses Alive, another light novel series with the same illustrator
- Combatants Will Be Dispatched!, another light novel series with the same illustrator
