= Gibiate =

Japanese anime television series

- Key visual

ジビエート (Jibiēto)
- Genre: Action, Fantasy
- Created by: Ryō Aoki
- Anime television series
- Directed by: Masahiko Komino
- Written by: Ryō Aoki
- Music by: Yuzo Koshiro
- Studio: Lunch Box; Studio Elle
- Licensed by: Crunchyroll; SEA: Medialink
- Original network: Tokyo MX, AT-X, BS Fuji
- Original run: July 15, 2020 – September 30, 2020
- Episodes: 12
- icon

Gibiate (Japanese: ジビエート, Hepburn: Jibiēto) is an original Japanese anime television series produced by Yoshitaka Amano, directed by Masahiko Komino at studios Lunch Box and Studio Elle and written by Ryō Aoki. It aired from July to September 2020.

== Plot ==
In 2030, Japan, a virus known as "Gibia" has infected humans throughout the world and turns them into different forms of monsters based on their age, sex, and race. A samurai, a ninja and a monk from the early Edo period travel through time and arrive in a ruined Japan. They aid a professor working on a cure for the virus and face ceaseless attacks from Gibias. They start the dangerous journey to find other survivors and must not only deal with monsters, but also outlaws that attack travelers for food.

== Characters ==
Sensui Kanzaki (神崎 千水, Kanzaki Sensui)
Voiced by: Tetsuya Kakihara
An exiled samurai transported forward in time to post-apocalyptic Tokyo. He was involved in the second Japanese invasion of Korea where he became known as the Slayer of Thousands while using a two sword style, with his katana, Suigetsumaru, and western sword, Halbert. He returned from the inconclusive invasion to relative obscurity, and served Jouzen Matsumoto. Matsumoto was indecisive during the Battle of Sekigahara where he made poor decisions, causing his downfall. This was when Sensui first encountered Kenroku from the Western Army, who challenged Sensui to a duel, but as they were evenly matched, Kenroku withdrew.
Kenroku Sanada (真田 兼六, Sanada Kenroku)
Voiced by: Hiroki Tōchi
An exiled shinobi from the past who is transported forward in time to post-apocalyptic Tokyo with Sensui Kanzaki. He proclaims that he is a relative of Yukimura and Masayuki Sanada.
Yukinojyo Onikura (鬼倉 雪之丞, Onikura Yukinojō)
Voiced by: Michio Hazama
A huge warrior monk from Honganji, the main base of warrior monks known as Ishiyama Honganji who fought against Oda Nobunaga in the past. He is also transported forward in time to post-apocalyptic Tokyo. He has the word "evil" tattooed on his forehead and wields a spiked club called Douzan.
Kathleen Funada (船田 キャスリーン, Funada Kyasurīn)
Voiced by: Yukiyo Fujii
A young scientist who is working with her mother to find a cure for the Gibia virus. It is later revealed that she unwittingly caused Sensui, Kenroku and Yukinojyo to be brought from the past when she wished wish for strong men to help humanity as she saw three flaming comets falling to Earth. The comets were in fact flaming pieces broken from Yoshinaga's spaceship and the ship's matter acted on her brainwaves, turning her wish into reality.
Dr. Yoshinaga (ヨシナガ博士, Yoshinaga Hakase)
Voiced by: Shūichi Ikeda
A doctor working on a cure for the Gibia virus, but also coincidentally its cause on Earth. It is revealed that he and the Meteora were from another planet. If people there drank the blood of the god, Soma, they would gain special powers, but those who were incompatible would become monsters. He had been working on an artificial version, when his fiancee, Meteora, accidentally drank some and became a monster. When chaos enveloped the planet, he left with Meteora and the failed blood samples in a cryogenic capsule, to create a vaccine to save her. However, the ship broke up on approach to Earth and the capsule, with Meteora and the samples fell to Earth first, causing the Gibia outbreak.
Yurika Funada (船田 ユリカ, Funada Yurika)
Voiced by: Emi Ito
Kathleen's mother and a doctor.
Ayame Hatonami (鳩波 彩愛, Hatonami Aya)
Voiced by: Hiroki Nanami
A former policewoman who joins Kathleen's group. Her preferred weapons are a pair of tonfa. She is seeking to arrest her father, a former criminal who escaped from prison. Ayame had to kill her own mother before she transformed into a monster after she was wounded by a Gibia.
Renjiro Hatonami (鳩波 蓮司郎, Hatonami Renjirō)
Voiced by: Kōji Ishii
The former head of small group of yakuza and Ayame's father. He survived the Gibia pandemic by being locked up in jail and escaped when the jail was attacked by Gibia. He leads a small band of former convicts calling themselves the Gallients.
Guren Soshigaya (祖師谷 紅蓮, Soshigaya Guren)
Voiced by: Hozumi Gōda
He is second in command of the Gallients. He has been with Renjiro since the yakuza era. His weapon is a two-handed pistol.
Isao Mikimoto (美樹本 伊佐夫, Mikimoto Isao)
Voiced by: Hiromi Sakimoto
A member of the Gallients who was in prison for murder. He is a former Olympic pole vaulter and specializes in attacks utilizing his skill with a spear.
Katsunori Hamuro (葉室 克典, Hamuro Katsunori)
Voiced by: Ryōhei Kimura
A member of the Gallients and a former prisoner.
Hidenori Sakuma (佐久間 秀典, Sakuma Hidenori)
Voiced by: Fukushi Ochiai
An overweight member of the Gallients and a former prisoner.

== Production and release ==
During Anime Expo 2019, Gibiate Project revealed that they are producing an original anime television series. Ryō Aoki is writing and planning the project, as well as serving as its executive producer. Masahiko Komino serves as director, animation character designer, adapting Yoshitaka Amano's original character designs into animation, as well as serving as chief animation director. Lunch Box and Studio Elle are in charge of animation production, with Naoki Serizawa designing the monsters, and Yuzo Koshiro composing the series' music. Other artists such as Japanese doll maker Mataro Kanabayashi the Third, bladesmith Kunihisa Kunihisa, calligrapher and artist Sisyu, and Hideo Komatsu the president of the shamisen company Komatsuya Co., Ltd. are also listed as collaborators.

The series was set to premiere at Anime Expo 2020, but was cancelled on account of the COVID-19 pandemic, and aired a special PR program on July 8, 2020, before airing the series from July 15 to September 30 of the same year, on Tokyo MX and other networks. The opening theme song is "Gibiate", while the ending theme song is "Endless", both performed by Sugizo, with the former featuring the Yoshida Brothers, and the latter featuring Maki Ohguro. The Chinese version of the ending theme was covered by VOGUE5.

Crunchyroll streamed the series as a Crunchyroll Original anime in North America, Central America, South America, Europe, Africa, Oceania, and the Middle East. The series is licensed by Medialink in Southeast Asia for streaming on Ani-One Asia's YouTube channel, as well as on the Chinese streaming service iQIYI.

No.	Title	Original release date
1	"Spirited Away"; Transliteration: "Kamigakushi" (Japanese: 神隠し)	July 15, 2020
During the Tokugawa period in Edo, the samurai, Sensui Kanzaki, and the shinobi, Kenroku Sanada, are being taken to exile by boat. They become caught in a furious storm and are transported forward in time to a devastated Tokyo which is in ruins. They see a man who transforms into a monster before their eyes and then attacks them. They are saved by Kathleen Funada and the old man Maeda who take them to a compound of surviving humans. She and Dr. Yoshinaga explain that the monsters are the result of the virus known as "Gibia" which has infected humans throughout the world.
2	"Beyond the Maelstrom"; Transliteration: "Uzu no Mukō" (Japanese: 渦の向こう)	July 22, 2020
Sensui and Kenroku are integrated into the community and try to adapt to the new world. One night, old man Maeda returns to the compound with a samurai sword for Sensui but he is followed by Gibia. They are beaten off, but later the spotlights fail and flying Gibia attack in earnest. Maeda is captured and wounded by a Gibia but he is rescued by Sensui who then attacks the Gibia with the sword, slicing them to pieces. More Gibia break through the defences and begin to attack the people. Kenroku joins the battle, initially using wire as his weapon before discovering the effectiveness of hand grenades. Later, the survivors of the attack prepare to leave, and Maeda asks Kenroku to kill him before the virus in his wounds turn him into a monster. As they leave two unknown men watch them as they discuss leaving the city themselves to find a new source of food.
3	"The Third Man"; Transliteration: "Dai-san no Otoko" (Japanese: 第三の男)	July 29, 2020
Following the Gibia attack, the seven survivors plan to move to the Niigata area and board a boat to mainland Asia. Dr. Yoshinaga leads an expedition to collect his Gibia vaccine research, but when they reach the helicopter on the rooftop they see an unconscious man on another roof. Yoshinaga pilots the helicopter to investigate, but a huge female Gibia known as Meteora releases supersonic waves destabilizing the helicopter, then shoots out appendages from its mouth and grabs onto it. Kenroku and Sensui try to free the helicopter but fail, so Sensui attacks the monster with his sword. Meanwhile, the unconscious man, a huge monk named Yukinojyo Onikura recovers and helps the rest of the team leap to safety, however the soldier Brian is injured by Meteora. Sensui is unable to kill Meteora, but Kenroku crashes the helicopter into it before leaping to safety. Later, while Yoshinaga is treating Brian's injury, the soldier transforms into a Gibia.
4	"Danger Zone"; Transliteration: "Kiken Chitai" (Japanese: 危険地帯)	August 5, 2020
The Gibia, which once was the soldier Brian, attacks Yoshinaga but it is killed by Adam. The group splits up to gather supplies for their trip to Niigata and Yurika finds a samurai exhibit containing Sensui's katana Suigetsumaru and his western sword, Halbert, while Yukinojyo recovers his spiked club, Douzan. They suddenly come under attack by lizard-like Gibia, but after fighting their way outside, they find more waiting for them on the ground and others flying in the air. Sensui, Kenroku and Yukinojyo cut a path through the monsters. The six survivors manage to escape in a camper van, however Sensui is exhausted. As talk turns to the past, Kenroku recalls when he first met Sensui during the Battle of Sekigahara when they were on opposing sides, however, due to the vagaries of war they were both exiled together. Back in the present, the group's van blows a tire, the noise attracting the attention of nearby Gibia which advance toward the stricken vehicle.
5	"Evil vs. Bushido"; Transliteration: "Aku tai Bushidō" (Japanese: 悪 対 武士道)	August 12, 2020
Kenroku and Yukinojyo fight off the flying the Gibia while other monsters advance towards the stricken van. Suddenly, Adam, with the knowledge that his infected wound will turn him into a Gibia, walks towards them and sets off a massive C-4 explosion, killing himself and the monsters. As the survivors escape, Yukinojyo is embarrassed by the taunts of Kenroku about never knowing a woman and his suggestion that the monk marry Yurika. This causes Yukinojyo to think back to the time when he was involved in the Ishiyama Hongan-ji War and the lonely death of his master, Douzan, just before he was spirited into the future. When the group stops for a break at a gas station, Kathleen is captured by a band of escaped convicts who call themselves the Galients. Their leader, Renjiro Hatonami, challenges Sensui to a duel, but Sensui easily disarms him and the Galients decide to withdraw. Later, Yoshinaga slowly drives the van into a dark tunnel, but they find it blocked with broken vehicles and infested with Gibia. The three warriors exit the van to fight the Gibia, but when Kathleen steps outside and throws hand grenades to clear the debris she falls and is threatened by a Gibia.
6	"Desperate Situation"; Transliteration: "Zettai Zetsumei" (Japanese: 絶体絶命)	August 19, 2020
Leader of the escaped convicts, Renjiro Hatonami, recalls how he survived the Gibia pandemic while locked up in jail. Meanwhile, Kathleen is threatened by a Gibia and the three warriors rush to her aid, however she is saved by Ayame, a former policewoman. As Kathleen faints, she recalls her early years with her parents and her father's death. After all the Gibia in the tunnel are finally slaughtered, Kathleen invites Ayame to join their group. Ayame agrees while the scene is watched from a distance by Hatonami's band, the Galients. Kathleen's group reach an onsen and relax for a while, where Sensui recalls the death of his parents and destruction of the Kanzaki clan, his adoption and training by Halbert before he died from an illness. It was the time when the Shimazu clan invaded Kuushuu to attack the Ōtomo clan. Ōtomo was aided by Sensui's later master, Jouzen Matsumoto, from whom he received his katana, Suigetsumaru. As they leave the onsen in their van, Kathleen's group realize that they are being followed by the Galients and Ayame recognizes her father.
7	"Dream Road to Death"; Transliteration: "Shi e no Mudō" (Japanese: 死への夢道)	August 26, 2020
The Galients are running out of food and supplies and so they try to stop the van of Kathleen's group, however they encounter Meteora Gibia again which is blocking the road. Although it initially has a human appearance, Meteora transforms into an armored beast and advances towards the vehicles. Sensui and Kenroku, aided by Yukinojyo, vainly try to stop it. Suddenly, Ayame uses an abandoned vehicle to drive it off the road bridge where it is carried away by swiftly flowing water. Sensui collapses from his previous injuries while Ayame tries to convince her father to stop attacking them and fight the Gibia instead. Later, Kathleen's group stop at a food factory but lizard Gibia are there. Ayame uses her tonfa to dispatch them and the group enter the facility to rest, however, Yurika is stabbed by the stinger of a almost dead Gibia.
8	"Letter of Farewell"; Transliteration: "Wakare no Tegami" (Japanese: 別れの手紙)	September 2, 2020
Yurika is stabbed in the foot by the stinger of a Gibia, but Dr. Yoshinaga hopes that the stinger may be empty of venom. While everyone rests and Sensui lays in bed stricken with a fever, Yurika leaves the facility. Later, Kathleen finds a letter from her mother in which she promises to return if she does not become a Gibia. Ayame and Kenroku leave the others to gather medical supplies from another store and encounter some lizard Gibia but manage to kill them. Meanwhile, a large group of Gibia surround the food factory, and Yukinojyo goes outside alone to confront them, locking Kathleen, Dr. Yoshinaga and Sensui inside.
9	"Until It All Burns Out"; Transliteration: "Moetsukiru Made" (Japanese: 燃え尽きるまで)	September 9, 2020
Ayame and Kenroku return from gathering supplies to find many dead Gibia, including Yurika's mother who had transformed into a Gibia, and Yukinojyo who died protecting Kathleen. Meanwhile, the Galients' van breaks down, and while Mikimoto, Hamuro and Sakuma are searching for food in a warehouse, they find a nest of Gibia. To avoid being attacked after nightfall, they destroy the Gibia with fire and explosives. Dr. Yoshinaga suggests that their group check out a nearby Gibia Virus Treatment Research Center to see if they can make use of any research they may find. That night, under a red moon, Kenroku recalls the past – his friend Shion who taught him how to use the kusarigama and who died on the night of a red moon.
10	"New Allies"; Transliteration: "Aratanaru Nakama" (Japanese: 新たなる仲間)	September 16, 2020
Dr. Yoshinaga and the group arrive at the Gibia Virus Treatment Research Center to find the site infested with Gibia. As they prepare to fight them, Renjiro Hatonami and his Galients arrive and attack the Gibia in return for being saved earlier. Together, the two groups clear the area of Gibia and sit down to eat together, becoming allies in the fight against Gibia. Renjiro begins to reconcile with his daughter, Ayame, and Dr. Yoshinaga continues his research for a vaccine. Meanwhile, the Meteora Gibia emerges from the nearby bay.
11	"Illusory Love"; Transliteration: "Maboroshi no Ai" (Japanese: まぼろしの愛)	September 23, 2020
The female humanoid Meteora Gibia has followed the human survivors, and Sensui and Kenroku try unsuccessfully to stop it. It seeks out Dr. Yoshinaga who is working on the vaccine, but Kenroku uses explosives to blow it out of the building and it falls to its death. Suddenly, Yoshinaga emerges from the building and reveals that he and Meteora are aliens, and he tells the story of the Gibia virus' journey to Earth. With Meteora dead, he injects Ayame with the Gibia virus and then himself. Ayame becomes a Gibia and kills Hamuro, Mikimoto, Sakuma and then Soshigaya who tries to protect Hatonami with his life. Sensui and Kenroku manage to kill the Ayame Gibia, but Yoshinaga is still alive and is continuing to transform into a monster.
12	"A Life's End"; Transliteration: "Inochi no Hate ni wa" (Japanese: 命の果てには)	September 30, 2020
Yoshinaga transforms into a Gibia similar to Meteora but retains his consciousness. Kenroku and then Sensui try to stop him, but he is to fast and his skin is too tough to penetrate, causing Sensui to break his katana. Yoshinaga continues to transform and becomes a flying Gibia similar to the one Ayame did. Yoshinaga explains how the three warriors from the past came to the present through pieces of his spaceship falling to Earth. Hatonami gives Sensui his katana, and then attacks Yoshinaga, sacrificing himself, but exploding multiple sticks of dynamite attached to his body. This severely damages Yoshinaga and Sensui finishes of Yoshinaga by severing his head. Kenroku and Kathleen then board a boat to leave for the Asian mainland, but Sensui refuses to join them after revealing that he was wounded by Yoshinaga and may become a Gibia. Kathleen hands Sensui a tracking beacon in case he survives as a human, and he turns back to attack the hordes of Gibia approaching the port.

== Reception ==
The reception was largely unfavorable, with most of the criticism aimed towards the CGI and story.
