= Before the Tutorial Starts: A Few Things I Can Do to Keep the Bosses Alive =

Japanese light novel series

- First light novel volume cover

チュートリアルが始まる前に ボスキャラ達を破滅させない為に俺ができる幾つかの事 (Chūtoriaru ga Hajimaru Mae ni: Bosukyara-tachi o Sasenai Tame ni Ore ga Dekiru Ikutsu ka no Koto)
- Genre: Action, fantasy, isekai
- Novel series
- Written by: Kotatsu Takahashi
- Published by: Kakuyomu
- Original run: November 27, 2021 – present
- Light novel
- Written by: Kotatsu Takahashi
- Illustrated by: Kakao Lanthanum
- Published by: ASCII Media Works
- English publisher: NA: Yen Press
- Imprint: Dengeki no Shin Bungei
- Original run: December 16, 2022 – present
- Volumes: 7
- Manga
- Written by: Kotatsu Takahashi
- Illustrated by: Kōji Yokoyama
- Published by: ASCII Media Works
- Imprint: Dengeki Comics NEXT
- Magazine: Dengeki Maoh
- Original run: December 26, 2023 – present
- Volumes: 4

Before the Tutorial Starts: A Few Things I Can Do to Keep the Bosses Alive (チュートリアルが始まる前に ボスキャラ達を破滅させない為に俺ができる幾つかの事, Chūtoriaru ga Hajimaru Mae ni: Bosukyara-tachi o Sasenai Tame ni Ore ga Dekiru Ikutsu ka no Koto) is a Japanese light novel series written by Kotatsu Takahashi and illustrated by Kakao Lanthanum. It began serialization on Kadokawa Corporation's Kakuyomu website in November 2021. It later began publication under ASCII Media Works' Dengeki no Shin Bungei imprint in December 2022. A manga adaptation illustrated by Kōji Yokoyama began serialization in ASCII Media Works' seinen manga magazine Dengeki Maoh in December 2023.

== Synopsis ==
The protagonist is reincarnated into the world of the video game Spirit Wars: Dungeon Magia. However, he is not the protagonist, nor a background character, but a boss who gets beaten in the tutorial. After he finds out that his older sister will die from an illness, he vows using his knowledge of the game to destroy every plot point that will result in his sister's death.

== Media ==
=== Light novel ===
Written by Kotatsu Takahashi, Before the Tutorial Starts: A Few Things I Can Do to Keep the Bosses Alive began serialization on Kadokawa Corporation's Kakuyomu website on November 27, 2021. It later began publication under ASCII Media Works' Dengeki no Shin Bungei light novel imprint on December 16, 2022. Six volumes have been released as of March 17, 2026.

During their panel at Anime Expo 2024, Yen Press announced that they had licensed the series for English publication with the first volume being released in December 2024.

No.	Original release date	Original ISBN	North American release date	North American ISBN
1	December 16, 2022	978-4-04-914754-4	December 24, 2024	978-1-9753-9255-0
1. "A Prologue in Which I Complain About How I Wish I Had Been Reincarnated as a Character Who Doesn't Die in Every Route"; 2. Chapter 1: "You Think I'll Let This Game End in Tears? Screw That!"; 3. Chapter 2: "A Meeting with the Ultimate Secret Boss"; 4. Chapter 3: "The End of Zero Unit: Himinglaeva Albion"; 5. Chapter 4: "The Power of the Ultimate Spirit"; 6. Chapter 5: "Whether Summer, Fall, Winter, or Spring: Training, Training, Training, Training!"; 7. Chapter 6: "The Adventurer's Exam"; 8. Chapter 7: "The Red-Haired Lancer"; 9. Intermission: "Sisters (Excerpt from Spirit Wars: Dungeon Magia, Kanata Aoto's Route, Chapter 32)"; 10. Chapter 8: "Haruka Aono"; 11. Chapter 9: "A United Front"; 12. Chapter 10: "The Dungeon Reaper and the Blades of Snow, Part 1"; 13. Chapter 11: "The Dungeon Reaper and the Blades of Snow, Part 2"; 14. Chapter 12: "The Dungeon Reaper and the Blades of Snow, Part 3"; 15. Epilogue: "Cherry Blossoms Fall on Sakuraba"
2	April 17, 2023	978-4-04-914930-2	April 22, 2025	978-1-9753-9408-0
1. Intermission: "A Violent Thunderstorm (Excerpt from Spirit Wars: Dungeon Magia, True Route, Chapter 47)"; 2. Chapter 1: "Albi, the Kind Spirit"; 3. Chapter 2: "But I Just Came to Buy Some Equipment"; 4. Chapter 3: "The Multipurpose Close-Range Weapon with Detachable Variant Combat Logic: "Eckesachs""; 5. Chapter 4: "The Night Before Departure, and Then"; 6. Chapter 5: "Eternal Darkness"; 7. Chapter 6: "Onward, Young Adventurers!"; 8. Chapter 7: "White Ogre, Grim Ogre"; 9. Chapter 8: "The First Midpoint: A Town Within the Dungeon"; 10. Chapter 9: "Let's Go For a Nighttime Stroll"; 11. Chapter 10: "Conquering the Unconquered"; 12. Chapter 11: "Death First, then Comes the Verdict"; 13. Chapter 12: "The Second Midpoint Jiggle"; 14. Chapter 13: "We Need a Long-Range Attacker"; 15. Chapter 14: "Growing Tensions"; 16. Chapter 15: "The Burning Blade of Ice"; 17. Chapter 16: "Maxwell's Demon and Adamant"; 18. Chapter 17: "Desmoterion"; 19. Chapter 18: "Jupiter: The Girl Who Would Be Dubbed the "Raging Dark""; 20. Chapter 19: "Cry of the Black Bolt and a Chat About Sad Games"; 21. Chapter 20: "Truth, the Sublime and the Raging Dark"; 22. Chapter 21: "Kamaku, the Doomquill Condor"; 23. Chapter 22: "Keraunos"; 24. Fragment: "Declaration of War"
3	August 17, 2023	978-4-04-915029-2	October 21, 2025	979-8-8554-0733-4
1. Prologue: "A Long ■■■■■tten Dream"; 2. Chapter 1: "Alliance"; 3. Jupiter's Journal of Joy: Parts 1–5; 4. Chapter 2: "Family"; 5. Chapter 3: "Preparations"; 6. Chapter 4: "Moonlight"; 7. Chapter 5: "Reinforcements"; 8. Chapter 6: "Rain"; 9. Chapter 7: "The Decisive Battle"; 10. Chapter 8: "Secret Strategy"; 11. Chapter 9: "The Dreaming Girl and the Beast of Black Lightning"; 12. Chapter 10: "Liberation"; 13. Chapter 11: "Hero"; 14. "Interlude, or Prologue for a Young Girl"; 15. Extra Story: "The Dreaming Beast and the One-Eyed Maid"
4	May 17, 2024	978-4-04-915367-5	June 9, 2026	979-8-8554-2253-5
1. Intermission: "Black Steel Assailant (Excerpt from Spirit Wars: Dungeon Magia, Normal Route, Chapter 36)"; 2. Chapter 1: "Challenged to a Duel"; 3. Chapter 2: "In Search of New Comrades"; 4. Chapter 3: "Battle Royale"; 5. Chapter 4: "Gathering of the Strong"; 6. Chapter 5: "Mass Elimination"; 7. Chapter 6: "The Young Weapon of Mass Destruction's Dilemma"; 8. Chapter 7: "Kingdom of Shadows"; 9. Chapter 8: "The After-Party's After-Party"; 10. Chapter 9: "The Black Knight"; 11. Chapter 10: "Shangri-La Water Paradise"; 12. Chapter 11: "The Hellish Cycle of Rebirth"; 13. Chapter 12: "Dark Clouds"; 14. Chapter 13: "Nocturne to a Midsummer's Eye"; 15. Chapter 14: "About the Knight / About the Boy"; 16. Chapter 15: "The Black Knight of the Seven Regalia and the Chain of New Life"; 17. Chapter 16: "???"; 18. Epilogue: "Thus Did He Once More Take Up the Mantle of Knight"
5	May 16, 2025	978-4-04-915645-4	—	—
6	March 17, 2026	978-4-04-916264-6	—	—

=== Manga ===
A manga adaptation illustrated by Kōji Yokoyama began serialization in ASCII Media Works' seinen manga magazine Dengeki Maoh on December 26, 2023. The manga's chapters have been compiled into five tankōbon volumes as of September 2026.

No.	Release date	ISBN
1	July 26, 2024	978-4-04-915863-2
2	December 27, 2024	978-4-04-916174-8
3	June 27, 2025	978-4-04-916524-1
4	February 27, 2026	978-4-04-916962-1
5	September 26, 2026	978-4-04-952441-3

== Reception ==
The series won the Grand Prize in the Isekai category at the 7th Kakuyomu Web Novel Contest in 2022. The series was ranked eighth in the tankōbon and novel category in the 2024 edition of Takarajimasha's Kono Light Novel ga Sugoi! guidebook. The series was ranked seventh in the tankōbon category at the 2024 Next Light Novel Awards.

== See also ==
- Combatants Will Be Dispatched!, another light novel series with the same illustrator
- The Healer Who Was Banished From His Party, Is, in Fact, the Strongest, another light novel series with the same illustrator
