= The Eccentric Doctor of the Moon Flower Kingdom =

Japanese manga series

- First tankōbon volume cover

月華国奇医伝 (Gekkakoku Kiiden)
- Genre: Fantasy; Medical drama; Romance
- Manga
- Written by: Tohru Himuka
- Published by: Kadokawa Shoten
- English publisher: NA: Seven Seas Entertainment
- Imprint: Asuka Comics DX
- Magazine: Asuka
- Original run: January 24, 2018 – present
- Volumes: 15
- Anime television series
- Directed by: Koichiro Kuroda
- Written by: Aki Mizuki
- Music by: Shiho Terada
- Studio: Studio Elle

The Eccentric Doctor of the Moon Flower Kingdom (Japanese: 月華国奇医伝, Hepburn: Gekkakoku Kiiden) is a Japanese manga series written and illustrated by Tohru Himuka. It began serialization in Kadokawa Shoten's shōjo manga magazine Asuka in January 2018. An anime television series adaptation produced by Studio Elle has been announced.

== Synopsis ==
When the prince of the Moonflower Kingdom travels to Ran Province, he and his companion Shiei are attacked by highwaymen sent after him by the concubine Ro. In the next town, they are sent to see the doctor Koyo. With her assistant Shingdam, she manages to save Shiei. Her knowledge of medicine and her surgical skills impress Prince Keiun. In the land, it is customary to banish illnesses with rituals, which have only limited success. To compensate her properly, the two noblemen take the doctor and her assistant back to the capital. Keiun wants to use Koyo's skills to help others in his kingdom and spread her knowledge. But the young, beautiful, and eccentric woman soon encounters resistance, and the prince remains in danger.

== Characters ==
Koyou (胡葉, Koyō)
Voiced by: Yumiri Hanamori (voice comic), Rina Hidaka (anime)
Keiun (景雲)
Voiced by: Takuya Satō (voice comic), Takeo Ōtsuka (anime)
Shin (シン) / Shingdam (シングダム, Shingudamu)
Voiced by: Kenji Akabane (voice comic), Taito Ban (anime)
Shiei (時英)
Voiced by: Tarusuke Shingaki (voice comic), Shōya Chiba (anime)

== Media ==
=== Manga ===
Written and illustrated by Tohru Himuka, The Eccentric Doctor of the Moon Flower Kingdom began serialization in Kadokawa Shoten's shōjo manga magazine Asuka on January 24, 2018. The series' chapters have been compiled into fifteen tankōbon volumes as of May 2026.

During their panel at Anime Expo 2022, Seven Seas Entertainment announced that they licensed the series.

No.	Original release date	Original ISBN	North American release date	North American ISBN
1	August 24, 2018	978-4-04-107071-0	March 21, 2023	978-1-68579-455-2
1. "How to Mend a Tear"; 2. "Can't Find Muscles Without Going to the Muscle Capital"; 3. "There's No Such Thing as a Free Manor"; 4. "The Thief Turns Out to be One's Next Patient"; Extra: "All for a Young Cloud's Smile"
2	February 22, 2019	978-4-04-107935-5	June 13, 2023	978-1-68579-550-4
5. "You Can't Learn Everything from Reading Books... But She Can"; 6. "The Gods Give Both Blessings and Curses"; 7. "An Incorrigible Flirt with Danger"; 8. "It's No Fun Thieving Alone"; 9. "No Jewels Wagered, No Trust Gained"
3	August 24, 2019	978-4-04-108613-1	September 12, 2023	978-1-68579-923-6
10. "The Sharp Girl Will Cut You Wide Open"; 11. "Muscle Paradise, a Feast for Your Eyes"; 12. "Unspilling the Spilt Milk"; 13. "Close to Divinity, Close to Danger"; Extra: "Sometimes Hunger Isn't Enough of an Appetizing Sauce"
4	February 22, 2020	978-4-04-109147-0	December 5, 2023	978-1-68579-946-5
14. "An Old Lecher Works In Mysterious Ways"; 15. "An Iron Pestle Might Not Grind Down to a Needle"; 16. "Strike While It's Hot, in Forging and in Feelings"; 17. "Like Finding a Needle in a Hairpin"; 18. "Like Finding a Needle in a Hairpin, Continued"; Extra: "Dream of the Sweet Loquat"
5	July 21, 2020	978-4-04-109762-5	March 5, 2024	979-8-88843-231-0
19. "Making Paper-Muscle Mischief"; 20. "Strip the Pride, Set the Shoulder"; 21. "It Takes an Enemy's Enemy to Catch an Enemy"; 22. "Dear Friends in Karyou, Greetings from Ribou"; 23. "Put Your Allies to the Test"
6	January 22, 2021	978-4-04-111032-4	June 11, 2024	979-8-88843-232-7
24. "Symptoms Are the Window to the Soul"; 25. "An Old Fox Is Not Easily Discouraged"; 26. "The Windfall Child"; 27. "Caught Between a Malady and Nemeses"; 28. "Do Your Best and Let Koyou Take Care of the Rest"
7	June 24, 2021	978-4-04-111499-5	September 10, 2024	979-8-88843-233-4
29. "The Commanding Weight of a Dropped Purse"; 30. "Not Yet Throwing in the Towel"; 31. "Trials and Spurs Make a Good Villager"; 32. "Perseverance is Far from Virtue"; 33. "Turning a Deaf Ear to the Cure"
8	January 24, 2022	978-4-04-112222-8	December 10, 2024	979-8-88843-234-1
34. "Out of the Frying Pan and over a Cliff"; 35. "Nothing Comes to Those Who Wait"; 36. "A Cornered Cat Will Gobble the Rat"; 37. "Cut the Deadweight, Keep What You Hew"; 38. "So Long, Friends in Ribou"
9	July 23, 2022	978-4-04-112665-3	March 11, 2025	979-8-89160-566-4
39. "Don't Let the Odd Chick Leave the Nest"; 40. "Politics Make Deadly Bedfellows"; 41. "A Father Ignores His Child Best"; 42. "The Koyou Poplar Is Fragrant from a Spout"; Extra: "A Lack of Volume Exposes the Rear"
10	February 22, 2023	978-4-04-113431-3	June 10, 2025	979-8-89160-567-1
43. "Some Refuse to Learn from the Young"; 44. "Employ a Cleaver When a Scalpel Won't Cut It"; 45. "My Darling is a Rose, but Life Has the Thorns"; 46. "Torn Paper Is Stronger When It Scabs"; 47. "A Ray of Light Amidst Isolation"
11	November 24, 2023	978-4-04-114229-5	September 9, 2025	979-8-89373-364-8
48. "A Beauty to Put Blooms to Shame"; 49. "Masking Your Age, but Showing Your Face"; 50. "Meat Minds Think Alike"; 51. "Stout Heart Never Won Over Fair Lady"; Extra: "Too Soon for the Slaughterhouse"
12	May 24, 2024	978-4-04-114798-6	December 16, 2025	979-8-89373-759-2
52. "On the Right Trail?"; 53. "An Audience With Consorts Means War"; 54. "Destiny Came Knocking When She Was a Youth"; 55. "Close as Mother and Child"
13	May 23, 2025	978-4-04-115965-1	June 23, 2026	979-8-89765-367-6
56. "Don't Stand Gaping at the Opening"; 57. "You Reap What You Wore"; 58. "The Past Casts a Shadow"; 59. "All Things in Moderation, like Meat and Meets 1"; 60. "A Ripple on the Wind"
14	November 21, 2025	978-4-04-116887-5	October 27, 2026	979-8-89863-244-1
15	May 22, 2026	978-4-04-117455-5	—	—

=== Anime ===
An anime television series adaptation was announced on May 22, 2026. The series will be produced by Studio Elle and directed by Koichiro Kuroda, with Aki Mizuki handling series composition, Akira Ono designing the characters, and Shiho Terada composing the music.

=== Other media ===
A voice comic adaptation was released on the Kadokawa Anime YouTube channel on June 24, 2021. It contained the voices of Yumiri Hanamori, Kenji Akabane, Takuya Satō and Tarusuke Shingaki.
