= Shōya Chiba =

Japanese voice actor

- 千葉 翔也
- Born: August 29, 1995 (age 31); Tokyo, Japan
- Education: Waseda University
- Occupations: Actor; voice actor; singer
- Years active: 2004–present
- Agent: Toy's Factory
- Notable work: Tsuki ga Kirei as Kotarō Azumi; Classroom of the Elite as Kiyotaka Ayanokōji; 86 as Shinei Nouzen; Toilet-Bound Hanako-kun as Kou Minamoto; Dororo as Tahōmaru; Wind Breaker as Akihiko Nirei; Blue Box as Taiki Inomata; The Ramparts of Ice as Minato Amamiya
- Height: 165 cm (5 ft 5 in)

Shōya Chiba (千葉 翔也, Chiba Shōya; born August 29, 1995) is a Japanese actor and singer. His notable roles include Kiyotaka Ayanokōji in Classroom of the Elite, Shinei Nouzen in 86, Kou Minamoto in Toilet-Bound Hanako-kun, Akihiko Nirei in Wind Breaker, Taiki Inomata in Blue Box, and Minato Amamiya in The Ramparts of Ice

== Biography ==
Chiba started as a child actor at Sanno Production. In April 2014, he joined Sigma Seven E where he remained for six years until he was transferred to its main division on July 1, 2020. He was announced as a part of the Kiramune unit SparQlew on November 19, 2017. On August 18, 2021, he was tested positive for COVID-19. On January 1, 2023, he announced that he had left Sigma Seven and has joined Toy's Factory. On October 21, 2023, it was announced that Chiba was cast for the voice of Akihiko Nirei in Wind Breaker.

Chiba debuted as a singer in January 2024 under King Amusement Creative with his first EP, "Blessing". His first album, Streak, was released in July 2025.

== Filmography ==
=== Anime ===
2004

- Curry No Kuni No Koba-ru, Koba-ru

2011

- Shōwa Monogatari, Kōhei Yamazaki

2015

- Haikyu!! Second Season, Kazuma Bobata, Tarō Onagawa
- Seraph of the End, Yūji

2016

- Alderamin on the Sky, Azan
- All Out!!, Kenji Gion
- B-Project: Kodou*Ambitious, Akane Fudo

2017

- Classroom of the Elite, Kiyotaka Ayanokōji
- The Idolm@ster SideM, Hayato Akiyama
- Tsuki ga Kirei, Kotarō Azumi

2018

- Banana Fish, Sing Soo-Ling
- Cells at Work!, B Cell
- Iroduku: The World in Colors, Yuito Aoi
- Xuan Yuan Sword Luminary, Shang Yue

2019

- Dororo, Tahōmaru
- Fire Force, Yū
- Stars Align, Mou Tanaka
- We Never Learn, Visitor

2020

- Gleipnir, Ikeuchi
- I'm Standing on a Million Lives, Shūji
- Toilet-Bound Hanako-kun, Kou Minamoto

2021

- 86, Shinei Nouzen
- Horimiya, Makio Tanihara
- Platinum End, Mizukiyo Minamikawa
- Project Scard: Scar on the Praeter, Kazuma Arashiba
- Skate-Leading Stars, Sota Jonouchi
- Visual Prison, Ange Yuki

2022

- Beast Tamer, Rein
- Blue Lock, Yūdai Imamura
- Classroom of the Elite 2nd Season, Kiyotaka Ayanokōji
- Play It Cool, Guys, Sōma Shiki
- Tiger & Bunny 2, Mr. Black / Subaru Sengoku
- Tribe Nine, Kazuki Aoyama
- Ya Boy Kongming!, Kabetaijin

2023

- Ao no Orchestra, Hajime Aono
- Ayakashi Triangle, Matsuri Kazamaki (male)
- Bullbuster, Tetsurō Okino
- Bungo Stray Dogs 4, Sigma
- Reign of the Seven Spellblades, Richard Andrews
- Sugar Apple Fairy Tale, Nadil
- The Faraway Paladin: The Lord of Rust Mountain, Will (adult)

2024

- Blue Box, Taiki Inomata
- Classroom of the Elite 3rd Season, Kiyotaka Ayanokōji
- I'll Become a Villainess Who Goes Down in History, Gale Evans
- Rurouni Kenshin: Kyoto Disturbance, Eiji Mishima
- That Time I Got Reincarnated as a Slime Season 3, Saare
- Why Does Nobody Remember Me in This World?, Kai
- Wind Breaker, Akihiko Nirei

2025

- Anyway, I'm Falling in Love with You, Airu Izumi
- Cultural Exchange with a Game Centre Girl, Renji Kusakabe
- Flower and Asura, Shūdai Tōga
- Hero Without a Class: Who Even Needs Skills?!, Kaito
- Lazarus, Donald McDonald / Visionary
- Mobile Suit Gundam GQuuuuuuX, Nabu
- Plus-Sized Misadventures in Love!, Shunzaburō Tanigawa
- Princession Orchestra, Giita
- Reincarnated as the Daughter of the Legendary Hero and the Queen of Spirits, Gadielle
- Summer Pockets, Hairi Takahara
- The Beginning After the End, Lucas Wykes
- Wind Breaker: Season 2, Akihiko Nirei

2026

- Champignon Witch, Henri
- Eren the Southpaw, Koichi Asakura
- Hell Mode, Mikhail Granvelle
- Jaadugar: A Witch in Mongolia, Kurtogan
- Jujutsu Kaisen: Season 3, Ranta Zen'in
- Kill Blue, Kazuma Rindō
- Petals of Reincarnation, Tōya Senji
- Red River, Zannanza Hattušili
- Romelia War Chronicle, Gran
- Saved by the Ice Cold Prince's Embrace, Tomas
- Sentenced to Be a Hero, Jayce Partiract
- Tamon's B-Side, Ōri Sakaguchi
- The Forsaken Saintess and Her Foodie Roadtrip in Another World, Ed
- The Frontier Lord Begins with Zero Subjects, Meiser
- The Ramparts of Ice, Minato Amamiya

TBA

- The Eccentric Doctor of the Moon Flower Kingdom, Shiei

=== Original video animation (OVA) ===
2024

- Code Geass: Rozé of the Recapture, Tomo'omi Oda

=== Anime films ===
- Shōwa Monogatari (2011), Kōhei Yamazaki
- Doraemon: Nobita and the New Castle of the Undersea Devil (2026), El

=== Video games ===
- Boku no Natsuyasumi 3, Boku
- The Idolmaster SideM, Hayato Akiyama
- Star Revolution☆88 Seiza no Idol Kakumei, Rito Harima
- B-Project Muteki*Dangerous, Akane Fudou
- Seven Knights: Time Wanderer, Sandy
- NEO: The World Ends With You, Kaie Ono
- Summer Pockets Reflection Blue, Takahara Hairi
- Paradigm Paradox, Ayumu Mamiya
- Arknights, Chestnut
- Anonymous;Code, Pollon Takaoka
- Touken Ranbu, Hacchou Nenbutsu
- Onmyōji, Shokurei
- Genshin Impact, Sethos
- Ikemen Prince: Beauty and Her Beast, Kagari Amagase
- Fate/Grand Order, Dante Alighieri
- Wind Breaker: Furyō-tachi no Eiyūtan, Akihiko Nirei

=== Drama CDs ===
- Koisuru Sharehouse ~which do you choose~ vol 2, Ayumu Sakaguchi

=== Multimedia projects ===
- Paradox Live, Rokuta
- Fragaria Memories (2023), Willmesh

=== Radio ===
- Chiba Shoya・Nogami Sho no ShofukuShorai
- Chiba Shoya no to be night

=== Dubbing ===
- Karate Kid: Legends, Li Fong (Ben Wang)
- Night at the Museum: Secret of the Tomb, Nick Daley (Skyler Gisondo)
- White House Farm, Jeremy Bamber (Freddie Fox)

== Discography ==
=== EP ===
- Blessing (2024)

=== Album ===
- Streak (2025)
