= Polkadot Stingray =

Japanese rock band

Polkadot Stingray ポルカドットスティングレイ
- Origin: Fukuoka, Japan
- Genre: Rock
- Years active: 2015–present
- Label: Universal Sigma
- Members: Shizuku; Kazuma Mitsuyasu; Yuki Uemura; Harushi Ejima
- Past members: Muro
- Website: polkadot-stingray.jp

Polkadot Stingray (ポルカドットスティングレイ, Porukadotto Sutingurei; stylized as POLKADOT STINGRAY) is a Japanese rock band from Fukuoka, Japan signed under Universal Sigma. The band's members consist of Shizuku (guitar and vocals), Harushi Ejima (guitar), Yuki Uemura (bass), and Kazuma Mitsuyasu (drums).

== History ==
=== 2014–2016: Indies era, Honenuki EP ===
In April 2014, vocalist and guitarist Shizuku, guitarist Muro, and drummer Kazuma Mitsuyasu founded the band and later scouted Yuki Uemura as their bassist in November. On April 29, 2015, they released "Yoake no Orange" (夜明けのオレンジ), their first single. Shortly before the release of their second single, "Gokusai" (極彩), Muro departed from the band, and Harushi Ejima was scouted as the band's newest guitarist.

On March 4, 2016, Polkadot Stingray made their first nationwide release with "Telecaster Stripe" (テレキャスター・ストライプ) as a digital single. By September, the music video had gained 1 million likes. This was then followed up by the release of their first extended play, Honenuki EP (骨抜きE.P.), on November 9, 2016.

=== 2017–present: Major label debut, Zenchizennō ===
In 2017, Polkadot Stingray released their first major-label extended play, Dai-Seigi (大正義), on April 26, with the leading track, "Electric Public" (エレクトリック・パブリック). The extended play was recorded with Hiromi Hirohiro from Tricot and ygarshy from Hitorie on bass due to Uemura injuring his arm. In July, they went on their first nationwide tour, stopping at six cities. On November 8, 2017, they released their first studio album, Zenchizennō (全知全能). To promote the album, they embarked on their second nationwide tour in 2018.

In February 2018, Polkadot Stingray announced that they were releasing the extended play Ichidaiji (一大事) in May, with its leading track, "Ichidaiji", as the theme song to the live-action film adaptation of Missions of Love. In September 2018, Polkadot Stingray announced that the song "Himitsu" (ヒミツ) will be the theme song for the film Smartphone wo Otoshita Dake nano ni.

Polkadot Stingray performed the ending theme to the anime series Radiant with the song "Radiant.", Godzilla Singular Point with the song "Aoi" (青い, Blue) and The Ramparts of Ice with the song "Sakasama" (逆様; 'Upside Down').

== Members ==
=== Current ===
- Shizuku (雫) – vocals and guitar (2014–present)
- Kazuma Mitsuyasu (ミツヤスカズマ) – drums (2014–present)
- Yuki Uemura (ウエムラユウキ) – bass (2014–present)
- Harushi Ejima (エジマハルシ) – guitar (2015–present)

=== Former ===
- Muro (ムロ) – guitar (2014–2015)

== Discography ==
=== Albums ===
Title	Details	Peak chart positions	Sales
Title	Details	JPN	Sales
Zenchizennō (全知全能)	Released: November 8, 2017; Label: Universal Sigma; Format: CD	6	
Uchōten (有頂天)	Released: February 6, 2019; Label: Universal Sigma; Format: CD	7	
Nanimono (何者)	Released: December 16, 2020; Label: Universal Sigma; Format: CD	—	
Odoru yō ni (踊る様に)	Released: September 7, 2022; Label: Universal Sigma; Format: CD	—	
Gekirin (逆鱗)	Released: December 24, 2025; Label: Universal Sigma; Format: CD	21	

=== Extended plays ===
==== Indies ====
Title	Details
Honenuki EP (骨抜きE.P.)	Released: November 9, 2016; Label: Tower Records; Formats: CD

==== Major ====
Title	Details	Peak chart positions	Sales
Title	Details	JPN	Sales
Dai-Seigi (大正義)	Released: April 26, 2017; Label: Universal Sigma; Formats: CD, digital download	7	
Ichidaiji (一大事)	Released: May 9, 2018; Label: Universal Sigma; Formats: CD, digital download	4	
Hyper Klaxon (ハイパークラクション)	Released: October 16, 2019; Label: Universal Sigma; Formats: CD, digital download	9	JPN: 8,549
Shinseiki (新世紀)	Released: January 8, 2020; Label: Universal Music; Formats: CD, digital download	6	JPN: 11,151

=== Singles ===
==== Indies ====
Title	Year	Album
"Yoake no Orange" (夜明けのオレンジ)	2015	Zenchizennō
"Gokusai" (極彩)	2015	Non-album single
"Telecaster Stripe" (テレキャスター・ストライプ)	2016	Zenchizennō

==== Major ====
Title	Year	Peak chart positions		Sales	Album
Title	Year	JPN		Sales	Album
Title	Year	Oricon Weekly	Hot 100	Sales	Album
"Himitsu" (ヒミツ)	2018	3	29	—N/a	Uchōten
"—" denotes releases that did not chart or were not released in that region.

== Tours ==
- Polkadot Stingray 2017 Tour: Dai-Seigi (ポルカドットスティングレイ 2017 TOUR 大正義)
- Polkadot Stingray 2018 Tour: Zenchizennō (ポルカドットスティングレイ 2018 TOUR 全知全能)
