= The Ramparts of Ice =

Japanese manga series

- First tankōbon volume cover, featuring Koyuki Hikawa

氷の城壁 (Kōri no Jōheki)
- Genre: Coming-of-age; Drama; Romantic comedy
- Manga
- Written by: Kōcha Agasawa
- Published by: Line Corporation (digital); Shueisha (print)
- English publisher: NA: MangaPlaza (digital)
- Imprint: Jump Comics
- Original run: January 10, 2020 – April 28, 2022
- Volumes: 14
- Anime television series
- Directed by: Mankyū
- Written by: Yasuhiro Nakanishi
- Music by: Kanade Sakuma; Natsumi Tabuchi
- Studio: Studio Kai
- Licensed by: Netflix (streaming)
- Original network: JNN (TBS)
- Original run: April 2, 2026 – present
- Episodes: 22
- icon

The Ramparts of Ice (Japanese: 氷の城壁, Hepburn: Kōri no Jōheki) is a Japanese web manga series written and illustrated by Kōcha Agasawa. It was first published as a webtoon under the Line Manga Indies section, and after collaborating with the Margaret editorial team, it was picked up for official serialization through the Line Manga digital service from January 2020 to April 2022. Shueisha published its chapters in 14 tankōbon volumes from July 2023 to February 2025.

The series follows Koyuki Hikawa, an introverted high schooler who keeps her distance from others, until three of her schoolmates draw her out and help her enjoy her adolescence to the fullest.

The first season of an anime television series adaptation produced by Studio Kai aired from April to July 2026. The second season premiered in October of the same year.

== Synopsis ==
High school student Koyuki Hikawa has trouble interacting with others, instead preferring to keep her distance and spend her time alone. However, when she meets Minato Amamiya, he suddenly starts trying to close the distance between them.

== Characters ==
=== Main ===
Koyuki Hikawa (氷川 小雪, Hikawa Koyuki)
Voiced by: Anna Nagase (Japanese); Erika Harlacher (English)
A reserved high school student who keeps her distance from most people, except her friend Miki, maintaining a cold exterior that earns her the nickname "The Ice Queen" among classmates. This demeanor stems from past teasing by boys about her short stature. Over time, she grows more open through her friendship with Miki and her relationships with Yota and Minato. Her limited social experience causes her to overthink her words, resulting in awkward moments. Initially intimidated by Minato's outgoing nature, she eventually develops feelings for him, but is heartbroken when he briefly dates Momoka Kuriki, whose emotional abuse echoes her middle school experiences. Despite this, she still tries to help him overcome his fears and express his feelings more openly, even though initially, Minato tries to push her away. When Minato returns and confesses his feelings, she reciprocates.
Miki Azumi (安曇 美姫, Azumi Miki)
Voiced by: Fūka Izumi (Japanese); Brianna Knickerbocker (English)
Koyuki's childhood best friend known since elementary school. She compulsively seeks to please others and maintain a favorable image, concealing a rowdier nature behind a friendly exterior. This earns her the label of class idol, which she dislikes. Consequently, she limits interactions with Koyuki at school until Koyuki befriends the boys. Miki initially distrusts Minato due to his reputation as an insincere romantic partner and fears his pushy behavior will hurt Koyuki. As Minato learns from his mistakes and grows closer to them, she warms to him. Initially unaware of Yota's feelings, she rejects him when unsure of her own, but eventually recognizes her love for him and reciprocates.
Minato Amamiya (雨宮 湊, Amamiya Minato)
Voiced by: Shōya Chiba (Japanese); Kyle McCarley (English)
Part of the school's "loud group". He believes that he can solve everyone's problems, a mindset he likens to "unlocking" people with keys. This draws him to Koyuki, whom he regards as a particularly difficult case, and he befriends her despite her efforts to avoid him. His behavior earns him a reputation for insincerity, and he inadvertently becomes a player in his romantic relationships. After Koyuki confronts him over his actions, he recognizes his mistakes and becomes more genuine while befriending the girls. He falls in love with Koyuki, but he keeps it hidden out of fear of rejection because Koyuki does not seem interested in him. When he believes that she does not love him, he briefly starts dating Momoka Kuriki, who has a crush on him, in a desperate attempt to move on. However, this only further hurts his mental state, as he never reciprocates Momoka's feelings. He eventually breaks up with her when he realizes that he is only masking his fear of loneliness. After Koyuki helps him overcome his fears and self-hatred, however, he realizes that he never stopped loving her. He finally confesses his feelings to her, and she happily accepts.
Yota Hino (日野 陽太, Hino Yōta)
Voiced by: Satoshi Inomata (Japanese); Jason Griffith (English)
Minato's childhood best friend, and a friend of Miki's from cram school. Yota has poor eyesight without his glasses and, despite being very tall for his age, is a kind person who gets along well with most people. This quickly endears him to Koyuki, to Minato's initial surprise. He has had a long-standing crush on Miki since their early middle school years, but has kept his feelings hidden out of fear of ruining his relationship with her. Initially, she rejects him after his confession, and although heartbroken, he continues to be good friends with her. Nevertheless, Miki eventually returns his feelings and they become a couple.

=== Supporting ===
Tsubasa Igarashi (五十嵐 翼, Igarashi Tsubasa)
Voiced by: Chiaki Kobayashi (Japanese); Ryan Colt Levy (English)
A soccer team member who was classmates with Koyuki and Miki in middle school, and is Koyuki's ex-boyfriend. Due to the bullying and trauma she experienced in her past, and how other girls constantly accused her of having a crush on him, despite her vehement denials, Koyuki has become afraid of him.
Tsukiko Shimojima (霜島月子, Shimojima Tsukiko)
Voiced by: Sakura Shinfuku (Japanese); Kayli Mills (English)
Koyuki's classmate and a member of the art club, whom she befriends when they both get put on library duty. She often acts as an audience surrogate, particularly in the burgeoning relationship between Koyuki and Minato, which she immediately deduces. Nevertheless, she is very supportive of them.
Momoka Kuriki (栗木桃香, Kuriki Momoka)
Voiced by: Akari Kitō (Japanese); Laura Stahl (English)
An antagonistic student that joins Koyuki's high school. She hides her true malicious and manipulative self under a friendly and bubbly person, as she pretends to befriend others around her, only to use those "friendships" to ruin other relationships. She is in love with Minato, which leads to her fully resenting Koyuki with a passion, as Minato's obvious crush on Koyuki enrages her. Her crush on Minato slowly turns into an obsession later on when he starts briefly dating her, and her bullying and abusive behavior towards Koyuki only escalates further. His lack of feelings for her, however, weighs on her the longer the relationship lasts. He eventually breaks up with her, which leaves her emotionally unstable. Nevertheless, she vows to work on herself, to become a better person, and to avoid repeating the same mistakes she made while dating him, though she still arrogantly refuses to apologize to Koyuki.
Yūki Azumi (安曇優希, Azumi Yūki)
Voiced by: Kakeru Hatano (Japanese); Caleb Yen (English)
Miki's mischievous younger brother, who is in the same grade as Momoka and Akine. He is also on good terms with Koyuki, and has been close with Akine since middle school.
Akine Atagawa (熱川秋音, Atagawa Akine)
Voiced by: Natsumi Kawaida (Japanese); Deneen Melody (English)
The younger sister of Koyuki's main bully from middle school, Manatsu Atagawa. Unlike her older sister, who was selfish, deceitful, violent and abusive, using Koyuki's "friendship" for her own gain, Akine is much softer towards Koyuki. She shows genuine interest in befriending her, and even feels resentful of her sister's past abusive behavior. She is aware of Momoka's obsessive crush on Minato and manipulative behavior towards Koyuki, and it makes her uncomfortable. She is close with Yuki, and looks up to him for his kind and supportive personality, though his mischievous behavior often frustrates her.

== Media ==
=== Manga ===
Written and illustrated by Kōcha Agasawa, The Ramparts of Ice began publication as a self-published webtoon under the Line Manga Indies section for about two years. Agasawa was then contacted by the Margaret editorial department, who facilitated its official serialization through Line's Line Manga digital service, where it was published from January 10, 2020, to April 28, 2022. Shueisha published the manga in print, under its Jump Comics imprint, with 14 tankōbon volumes released from July 4, 2023, to February 4, 2025. A fanbook, which will include an epilogue chapter, is set to release on January 4, 2027.

The series is published in English on NTT Solmare's MangaPlaza website.

==== Volumes ====
No.	Japanese release date	Japanese ISBN
1	July 4, 2023	978-4-08-883544-0
1. "Koyuki Hikawa" (氷川小雪, Hikawa Koyuki); 2. "Miki Azumi" (安曇美姫, Azumi Miki); 3. "A Self-Perception Gap" (イメージの溝, Imēji no Mizo); 4. "A Line and a Wall" (線と壁, Sen to Kabe); 5. "Allergies" (アレルギー, Arerugī); 6. "Minato Amamiya" (雨宮湊, Amamiya Minato); 7. "A Locksmith" (鍵師, Kagi-shi); 8. "Childhood Friends" (幼馴染, Osananajimi); 9. "An Encounter" (遭遇, Sōgū); 10. "Yota Hino" (日野陽太, Hino Yota); 11. "Three people" (3人, 3-ri); 12. "Empty" (からっぽ, Karappo); 13. "Melting Snow" (融雪, Yūsetsu)
2	July 4, 2023	978-4-08-883582-2
14. "Four people" (4人, 4-ri); 15. "Arrows" (矢印, Yajirushi); 16. "Distance" (距離, Kyori); 17. "Misaligned" (掛け違い, Kake-chigai); 18. "How They Met" (出会い, Deai); 19. "Unresolved Feelings" (わだかまり, Wadakamari); 20. "Untouchable" (不可侵, Fukashin); 21. "Meddling" (干渉, Kanshō); 22. "Stepping In" (踏み込み, Fumikomi); 23. "Distress" (苦渋, Kujū); 24. "Incompatible" (相容れない, Aiirenai)
3	August 4, 2023	978-4-08-883583-9
25. "Weeping" (嗚咽, Oetsu); 26. "Change" (変化, Henka); 27. "Views on Love" (恋愛観, Ren'ai-kan); 28. "A Slip of the Tongue" (失言, Shitsugen); 29. "Control Failure" (制御エラー, Seigyo Erā); 30. "A New Trimester" (新学期, Shin Gakki); 31. "Bonds" (親情, Shinjō); 32. "Peace" (ピース, Pīsu); 33. "'Solitude'" (「孤」, 'Ko')
4	September 4, 2023	978-4-08-883648-5
34. "'Alone'" (「個」, 'Ko'); 35. "A Secret" (ナイショ, Naisho); 36. "Arrows (2)" (矢印（2）, Yajirushi (2)); 37. "Spinning Your Wheels" (空回り, Karamawari); 38. "Coating" (メッキ, Mekki); 39. "'I Love You'" (「大好き」, 'Daisuki'); 40. "Yin and Yang" (陰と陽, In to yō); 41. "Harmony" (和, Wa)
5	October 4, 2023	978-4-08-883649-2
42. "Almost Equal" (等し並み, Hitoshinami); 43. "Realization" (自覚, Jikaku); 44. "Progress and Treading Water" (進歩・足踏み, Shinpo ashibumi); 45. "Tension" (軋轢, Atsureki); 46. "Cause and Effect" (因果, Inga); 47. "Malice" (害意, Gai i); 48. "Spring" (春, Haru); 49. "The New School Year" (進級, Shinkyū)
6	November 2, 2023	978-4-08-883650-8
50. "A Special Spot" (特別枠, Tokubetsu-waku); 51. "A Troublemaker?" (不穏分子？, Fuon bunshi?); 52. "Middle School" (中学, Chūgaku); 53. "Turning Point" (転回, Tenkai); 54. "Heat and Color" (熱量と色, Netsuryō to iro); 55. "Heat Conduction" (熱伝導, Netsu dendō); 56. "Discoloration" (変色, Henshoku); 57. "Different Colors" (色違い, Iro chigai)
7	December 4, 2023	978-4-08-883750-5
58. "Thunderclap" (霹靂, Hekireki); 59. "Misunderstandings" (すれ違い, Surechigai); 60. "Interwoven Intentions" (綾なす意図, Ayanasu ito); 61. "The Sports Festival (1)" (体育祭1, Taiikumatsuri 1); 62. "The Sports Festival (2)" (体育祭2, Taiikumatsuri 2); 63. "The Sports Festival (3)" (体育祭3, Taiikumatsuri 3); 64. "After the Festival" (祭りの後, Matsuri no ato); 65. "Realization" (認識, Ninshiki); 66. "Sense of Values" (価値観, Kachikan)
8	January 4, 2024	978-4-08-883751-2
67. "Understanding" (理解, Rikai); 68. "Bombshell" (弾, Dan); 69. "Certainty" (確信, Kakushin); 70. "Offense and Defense" (攻・守, Osamu mori); 71. "Conclusion" (結び, Musubi); 72. "Cloudy With a Chance of Rain" (曇雨天, Kumori uten); 73. "Fellow Confidants (The Boys' Side)" (聴取―表, Chōshu – hyō); 74. "Fellow Confidants (The Girls' Side)" (聴取―裏, Chōshu – ura)
9	February 2, 2024	978-4-08-883752-9
75. "Unraveling" (解きほぐし, Tokihogushi); 76. "Arrows (3)" (矢印（3）, Yajirushi (3)); 77. "Trigger" (引き金, Hikigane); 78. "Past and Present" (因果応報, Ingaōhō); 79. "Stop and Go" (停止と進行, Teishi to shinkō); 80. "Summer Vacation♪" (夏休み♪, Natsuyasumi ♪); 81. "Chance" (チャンス, Chansu); 82. "True feelings" (本心, Honshin)
10	March 4, 2024	978-4-08-883753-6
83. "Devotee" (信奉者, Shinbōsha); 84. "Summer Festival" (夏祭り☆, Natsu Matsuri); 85. "Options" (選択肢, Sentakushi); 86. "Different Points of View" (視点A・B, Shiten A B); 87. "Remission" (緩解, Kankai); 88. "Coexistence" (併存, Heizon); 89. "A Peacemaker" (バランサー, Baransā); 90. "Not Enough" (飽き足りない, Aki tarinai)
11	May 2, 2024	978-4-08-883754-3
91. "Cultural Festival (1)" (文化祭1, Bunkamatsuri 1); 92. "Cultural Festival (2)" (文化祭2, Bunkamatsuri 2); 93. "Perspective" (観点, Kanten); 94. "Incomprehensible" (無理解, Mu rikai); 95. "Accumulation" (蓄積, Chikuseki); 96. "Change" (変, Hen); 97. "Release" (放免, Hōmen)
12	July 4, 2024	978-4-08-883755-0
98. "Transition" (移り目, Utsuri-me); 99. "A Glitch" (バグ, Bagu); 100. "Breaking the Lock" (破錠, Hajō); 101. "Crossing Wires" (混線, Konsen); 102. "One Step at a Time" (一歩一歩, Ippoippo); 103. "School Trip (1)" (修学旅行1, Shūgakuryokō 1); 104. "School Trip (2)" (修学旅行2, Shūgakuryokō 2)
13	September 4, 2024	978-4-08-884198-4
105. "School Trip (3)" (修学旅行3, Shūgakuryokō 3); 106. "Foundations of Communication" (報・連・相, Hō ren ai); 107. "Weekend (Side A)" (週末 sideA, Shūmatsu sideA); 108. "Weekend (Side B)" (週末 sideB, Shūmatsu sideB); 109. "Failure to Launch" (はじまらない, Hajimaranai); 110. "Restraint" (箍, Taga); 111. "Christmas" (クリスマス, Kurisumasu)
14	February 4, 2025	978-4-08-884404-6
112. "The Stillness of the Night" (夜のしじま, Yoru no shijima); 113. "Existence" (存在, Sonzai); 114. "Warmth" (暖, Dan); 115. "Succession" (繋ぐ, Tsunagu); 116. "Off to the Next Season" (次の季節へ, Tsugi no kisetsu e); 117. "Melting Ice" (解氷, Gehyō); "Extra" (おまけ, Omake)

=== Anime ===
In January 2025, it was announced that the manga would receive an anime television series adaptation. It is produced by Studio Kai and directed by Mankyū, with series composition by Yasuhiro Nakanishi, characters designed by Miki Ogino, and music composed by Kanade Sakuma and Natsumi Tabuchi. The series aired from April 2 to July 2, 2026, on TBS and its affiliates. The opening theme song is "Tōmei" (透明; 'Invisible'), performed by Novelbright, while the ending theme song is "Sakasama" (逆様; 'Upside Down'), performed by Polkadot Stingray. Netflix is streaming the series globally.

Following the airing of the final episode of the first season, a second season was announced, which premiered on October 1 of the same year. The opening theme song is "Escort" (エスコート), performed by The Beat Garden, while the ending theme song is "Hanakage" (花蔭), performed by Superfly.

==== Episodes ====
===== Season 1 =====
No. overall	No. in season	Title	Directed by (Note: Production staff information is taken from the ending credits of each episode.)	Written by	Storyboarded by	Original release date
1	1	"Lines and Walls"; Transliteration: "Sen to Kabe" (Japanese: 線と壁)	Teru Ishii	Yasuhiro Nakanishi	Mankyū	April 2, 2026
Koyuki Hikawa has trouble interacting with others and is viewed as being cold and unapproachable. While wondering why people avoid her, she meets Minato Amamiya, who compliments her humorous side. Koyuki also relaxes around her best friend Miki Azumi, who laments that she is not able to express her true self to the people who revere her as the school's popular girl. Koyuki remarks to Miki that people will befriend her regardless of how she presents herself, adding that she personally prefers being alone. The next day, Koyuki meets Yota Hino while returning Miki's notebook, and she shares her appreciation of his laid-back demeanor. Minato attempts to talk with her on their next encounter, though Koyuki remains wary of his motives. Minato senses Koyuki is closing herself off, as Koyuki recounts how she chooses to be alone after experiencing constant teasing and bullying in middle school. Koyuki is then pestered by a group of men on her way home, when she runs into Yota.
2	2	"Locksmith"; Transliteration: "Kagi-shi" (Japanese: 鍵師)	Mamoru Enomoto	Yasuhiro Nakanishi	Mamoru Enomoto	April 10, 2026 (Note: Due to the broadcast of the 2026 Masters Tournament, the episode aired at 1:28 a.m. JST, one hour and 32 minutes after the regular air time on TBS.)
Koyuki uses Yota to escape the men and apologizes to him. Yota states he understands her situation, allowing Koyuki to know him better. They discuss their common connection to Miki, while a bewildered Minato sees them by chance. Miki later joins Koyuki and Yota's banter, where Koyuki learns that Minato is their acquaintance. Koyuki comes to respect Yota and befriends him. Meanwhile, Minato continues to take an interest in Koyuki's distant behavior when his current girlfriend requests that they break up, pointing out his insincerity. Minato then grows disconcerted on seeing Yota and Koyuki talk cordially at school. Yota invites Koyuki and Miki to a study session for the upcoming exams at his classroom, reassuring them that Minato and his peers would be gone during their stay. After going home, Koyuki is surprised that she experienced fun with Miki and Yota, which conflicts with her desire to remain alone. Koyuki and Miki meet Yota for the study session, as Minato also decides to join the group.
3	3	"3+(←)1"	Yūichi Abe	Yasuhiro Nakanishi	Yūichi Abe	April 16, 2026
Minato shares his recent breakup to Miki and Yota during the session. Minato remarks his sadness before attempting to make small talk with Koyuki, much to Miki's annoyance. After the study session, Minato remains bothered by Koyuki and Yota's friendship, and he tries to speak to Koyuki again. Koyuki begins assuming Miki has a crush on Minato and tries distancing herself to avoid conflict, but fails. The next day, while Koyuki was walking to school, Minato caught up with her and, wanting to break the ice between them, asked her about Tsubasa Igarashi, a former classmate and boyfriend of hers unbeknownst to Minato. Koyuki learns Tsubasa is visiting her school on the last day of exams. During school hours, Minato meets up with Koyuki again, which Koyuki begrudgingly exchanges contact info with Minato before running away upon seeing Miki. At another study session, Minato observes Koyuki relaxing around Yota, so he asks Koyuki if she is dating someone. Koyuki is dumbfounded by his question and sees Miki glaring, further confusing her. Miki privately confronts Minato on his intentions with Koyuki, revealing that Miki is aware of Minato's savior complex in approaching lonely people since meeting him with Yota at cram school.
4	4	"Impenetrable"; Transliteration: "Fukashin" (Japanese: 不可侵)	Shigatsu Yoshikawa	Yasuhiro Nakanishi	Yūko Horikawa	April 23, 2026
Miki angrily scolds Minato on his self-righteous behavior and warns him not to pity Koyuki, though Minato professes his innocence. He apologizes for pitying Miki back in cram school and regards her as a friend and equal, which Miki accepts with tears of joy. They return to the session, where Koyuki is shocked to see Miki's eyes swelling. Koyuki asks what happened, though Miki is evasive. Koyuki and her peers survive the exams, and Miki invites her, Yota, and Minato for lunch. Koyuki seemingly sees Miki and Minato being on good terms, when Minato asks Koyuki on what she does in her free time. Minato's question causes Koyuki to recall her hobbies being mocked by Tsubasa, so she states she does nothing. Koyuki internalizes her evasiveness being a mechanism to avoid people from seeing her true self and face rejection. After exams, Miki encounters Tsubasa visiting their school. Miki hopes that Koyuki does not run into him, but Koyuki sees Tsubasa talking to Minato while resting at the school clinic. Minato asks Tsubasa if he knew who Koyuki was, though Tsubasa denies having knowledge. The following day, Minato approaches Koyuki and talks about Tsubasa and middle school. Minato realizes the topics traumatize Koyuki and tries to move on, further upsetting Koyuki as she calls him a "busybody" and leaves.
5	5	"Change"; Transliteration: "Henka" (Japanese: 変化)	Teru Ishii	Yasuhiro Nakanishi	Teru Ishii	April 30, 2026
Yota manages to overhear Minato's conversation with Koyuki. While Koyuki was hiding in the clinic, Yota approached Koyuki. Yota clarifies that Minato harbors no ill intentions. He also explains how he and Minato knew her since junior high school from hearing Miki's stories of Koyuki being bullied. Koyuki expresses regret for refusing to hear Minato out and losing her temper and also realizes that Minato was being considerate of her past, so she aims to personally apologize to Minato. Minato accepts their different outlooks and decides to ignore her from now on. At the end of the school day, Koyuki chases after Minato and tearfully apologizes for lashing out, which Minato sincerely acknowledges. Koyuki begins laughing again upon seeing a picture of Minato's pet dog, flustering the latter as they bid each other farewell. Minato wonders on his future interactions with Koyuki, and Koyuki remarks she will try to change her outlook and behavior. She then joins Miki and their middle school classmates to discuss on their romantic lives. Koyuki states her intention of not entering into a relationship, during which Miki feels guilt for introducing Koyuki to Tsubasa.
6	6	"New Semester"; Transliteration: "Shin Gakki" (Japanese: 新学期)	Teru Ishii	Yasuhiro Nakanishi	Yuta Murano	May 7, 2026
Miki painfully reminisces on thoughtlessly telling a troubled Koyuki to date Tsubasa after the latter expressed interest to her. Minato is criticized by his friends for his lax treatment of past breakups, as he struggles in understanding how to express his emotions. Elsewhere, Koyuki and Yota visit Miki at her work, where Miki also begins to notice Koyuki and Yota's growing closeness and cautiously supports them. Minato later sees Koyuki and Yota's matching profile pictures and assumes they are dating. Minato learns of their meetup with Miki at the start of a new semester, leaving him hurt that he was left out. Koyuki hangs out with Yota and reflects on her overthinking tendencies standing in contrast to Yota's free-spirited attitude, adding that she aspires to be like him. Koyuki also remarks on feeling at ease around Yota when she meets his youthful mother. Yota opens up on his biological mother dying when he was young and notes his family is the only aspect that feels normal to him, stunning Koyuki.
7	7	"Loneliness and Solitude"; Transliteration: "Ko to Ko" (Japanese: 孤と個)	Mamoru Enomoto	Yūta Suzuki	Mamoru Enomoto	May 14, 2026
Yota returns home to his family and attempts to tune them out. Koyuki worries that Yota may be bottling his thoughts, causing Koyuki to look back on her loneliness in middle school following her parents' divorce. She wonders on intervening in Yota's situation as she meets him after school. Yota discloses to Koyuki on his feelings of being disregarded by his new family. Koyuki states he should allow himself to open up more. An embarrassed Yota then reveals his feelings for Miki, leaving Koyuki overjoyed that Yota likes Miki for who she truly is. Despite this, Yota admits he prioritizes their friendship and assumes Miki would not reciprocate his feelings. Yota thanks Koyuki on being a trusted friend, and he begins opening up to his family's kindness. Koyuki supports Yota and Miki's relationship by giving them space while talking to Minato at school, flustering Yota. Minato and Miki continue to assume that Koyuki and Yota like each other, so Miki enthusiastically plans a study session to secretly set them up for a date.
8	8	"On Equal Footing"; Transliteration: "Hitoshinami" (Japanese: 等し並み)	Yūichi Abe	Yū Ōshika	Yūichi Abe	May 21, 2026
Miki recounts on changing her personality upon seeing her rough behavior bring anguish to Koyuki and other students back in middle school. Miki talks to Yota and Minato, with the latter asking her on Koyuki's interests. Miki's peers ask if she likes either Minato or Yota, but Miki abrasively denies their assumptions. Miki becomes troubled on maintaining her new personality, which is worsened when one of Miki's friends sees her loosening up around her coworkers and has their friend group alienate her. Miki fears she does not belong, and she tearfully confides in Yota on her concerns before unconsciously sharing her love for him as a friend. Koyuki later connects with Miki on their anxieties and recommends on being herself around the people who accept her for who she is. Realizing that she has been deceiving her friends and failing to learn more about them, Miki makes up with her friends and proudly showcases her true self more. Miki thanks Koyuki for her advice, as she shows off her new dyed hair to her, Minato, and Yota the next day. Koyuki and Minato leave ahead, though they become confused at the other's reasons for leaving behind Miki and Yota.
9	9	"Self-awareness"; Transliteration: "Jikaku" (Japanese: 自覚)	Shigatsu Yoshikawa	Yasuhiro Nakanishi	Hirokazu Kanai	May 28, 2026
Minato asks Koyuki if she is still scared of him, leading Koyuki to realize how she has been treating him since reconciling. Koyuki and Minato grow closer, with Minato aspiring to genuinely learn more about Koyuki. Meanwhile, Miki voices her support for Yota having a crush before surprising Koyuki and Minato. Koyuki later chats with fellow library assistant and classmate Tsukiko Shimojima on their awkward experiences with large groups. Koyuki then joins Miki, Minato, and Yota to the mall and looks back on her growth as a person. Minato and Miki spot Tsubasa, and they agree to keep him away from Koyuki. The group enjoys their time and splits up, only for Koyuki and Miki to run into Tsubasa. Koyuki, who openly voiced her dislike for Tsubasa when they broke up, tries to converse with him, though Tsubasa reacts dismissively. Miki apologizes for setting them up to date, causing Koyuki to reveal she only dated Tsubasa to feel her love being reciprocated and voices regret for hurting him. Koyuki believes she is incapable of being loved, so she prays for Miki to find her own love and happiness.
10	10	"Spring"; Transliteration: "Haru" (Japanese: 春)	Teru Ishii	Yū Ōshika	Teru Ishii	June 4, 2026
Koyuki and her friend group enjoy their spring break by visiting an amusement park. They enjoy the park's amenities though a disoriented Koyuki and Minato decline on joining the next ride. While a bashful Yota and Miki enjoy the ride, Minato wins a game to gift Koyuki a plushie for her belated birthday, leaving her charmed. Koyuki is surprised to see an embarrassed Minato and teases him. Koyuki later begins a new school year with her friend group and Tsukiko as her classmates. Tsukiko sees the kindness of Koyuki's friends and befriends them. Koyuki also introduces her childhood friend and Miki's younger brother Yuki to her friends. Minato sees Koyuki's closeness to Yuki and jealously wishes for Koyuki to only focus on him. Miki has their friend group join the cheer squad for the upcoming sports festival, during which Tsukiko deduces that Minato has a crush on Koyuki. After practice, Koyuki is introduced to Akine Atagawa, learning that she is the younger sister of Manatsu, who bullied Koyuki for dating Tsubasa.
11	11	"Inversion"; Transliteration: "Tenkai" (Japanese: 転回)	Miichiro Kamenosono	Yasuhiro Nakanishi	Miichiro Kamenosono & Teru Ishii	June 11, 2026
In a flashback to middle school, Koyuki reluctantly befriended Manatsu, who disliked her openness towards their seniors and used her to get closer to them. Manatsu and her clique harassed Koyuki, leaving her shakened. Tsubasa, who is Manatsu's crush, approached Koyuki on dating her, and Koyuki hesitantly accepted. Manatsu continued her bullying, but Koyuki exposed her actions in front of Tsubasa. Manatsu quietly chided Koyuki for exploiting Tsubasa to escape her situation. In the present, Koyuki grows uneasy on how much Akine knows of her past. Koyuki and Akine cross paths, much to Koyuki's discomfort. Minato catches up to them and converses with Akine, calming Koyuki. She also meets Akine's friend Momoka Kuriki, who secretly urges Akine to find out if Minato, whom she has a crush on, has a girlfriend. Akine refuses to pry on Minato's private life, much to Momoka's chagrin. Momoka spies on Koyuki hanging out with Yota. Koyuki and Minato later bond on their shared interests as Momoka joins them. Momoka learns that Koyuki is only friends with Yota and Minato is single. Despite this knowledge, Momoka continues observing their closeness.
12	12	"Thunder"; Transliteration: "Hekireki" (Japanese: 霹靂)	Teru Ishii, Takumi Yokoyama & Minagi Koga	Studio Kai & Kei Shimobayashi	Sayaka Kobayashi	June 18, 2026
Koyuki continues to learn more about Minato while contemplating on her mundane life. Minato then shares his desire to spend more time with Koyuki, flustering her. Koyuki later declines Miki's invitation to a trip with Yota and talks about his charm. Miki is surprised at Koyuki's deeper knowledge of Yota as she hangs out with a bashful Yota. Miki states to Yuki that she does not see herself dating Yota upon returning home. Meanwhile, Koyuki finds herself talking more to Momoka, who declares her love for Minato based on his looks. Hearing that Momoka views him at face value, Koyuki realizes her own feelings for Minato, causing her to avoid him. Minato wonders on Koyuki's recent behavior when Momoka approaches him for a casual conversation. Minato is left appalled after Momoka discusses how Koyuki and Yota work as a couple and her disgust at the thought of one of her friends liking her. She then states that Koyuki does not see her friends as love interests, leaving a disheartened Minato in self-doubt. Sometime later, Koyuki crosses paths with Akine again, and Akine asks her to support Momoka growing close to Minato.
13	13	"Perception"; Transliteration: "Ninshiki" (Japanese: 認識)	Yūichi Abe	Yasuhiro Nakanishi	Yūichi Abe	June 25, 2026
On the day of the sports festival, Koyuki sees Minato talking to Momoka and tries to not overthink their interactions. Koyuki bonds with her friends while also observing Momoka ingratiate herself to them. She continues to feel flustered around Minato, which Yota notices. After Momoka requests she take a picture of her and Minato together, Koyuki unconsciously grows jealous of Momoka's advances. Koyuki and Minato hesitate on taking photos with each other, so Yota arranges it. Koyuki discloses to Yota on her burgeoning feelings for Minato, allowing them to connect on their difficulty approaching their crushes and desire to not jeopardize their friendships. Minato later invites Koyuki and Tsukiko to the cheer squad's wrap party, which the girls accept. Meanwhile, Miki and Yota conduct cleanup duty for the sports festival. Yota immediately shields Miki from a falling box and Miki sees Yota acting bashful. Although she initially assumes Yota is joking, Miki gradually realizes that he harbors genuine feelings for her. Miki runs away in shock and fears her friendship with Yota was one-sided.
14	14	"Bombshell"; Transliteration: "Bakudan" (Japanese: 爆弾)	Sayaka Kobayashi	Yasuhiro Nakanishi	Mamoru Enomoto	July 2, 2026
Yota discloses to Koyuki that Miki found out about his crush on her. Although Koyuki asserts that Miki will not hate him, Yota declares he will put an end to the situation. Miki ruminates and laments her fraught friendship with Yota, while Koyuki thinks on her friend group's dynamics. At the wrap party, Koyuki sees the cheer squad support Minato and Momoka as a couple. Momoka joins Koyuki and Tsukiko's table to flaunt on wanting to date Minato. Momoka bluntly reveals she is aware of his crush on Koyuki, stunning the latter. Koyuki fully reevaluates her past interactions with Minato as they continue to awkwardly bond, with Akine silently supporting them. Later, Koyuki and Minato play with their sparklers alongside their friends, unaware that Momoka is coldly observing them. Yota privately meets with Miki to properly confess his feelings to her but remorsefully asks that they remain friends. Miki tearfully rejects Yota due to being unsure of her feelings, which Yota quietly respects.

===== Season 2 =====
No. overall	No. in season	Title	Directed by	Written by	Storyboarded by	Original release date
15	1	"Clouds and Rain"; Transliteration: "Kumori Uten" (Japanese: 曇雨天)	Mio Nishimura & Yurina Utsurogi	Yasuhiro Nakanishi & Yūta Suzuki	Kenji Setō	October 2, 2026 (Note: The episode aired at 12:26 a.m. JST, 30 minutes after the regular air time on TBS.)
Knowing that Koyuki will not advance her relationship with Minato, Momoka aims to grow closer to him and drive Koyuki away. Miki struggles to talk to Yota since rejecting him. Miki talks to Minato on the pain of unrequited love, as Yota updates Koyuki on the situation. Minato comforts Miki on romance between friends being natural, only to recall and be traumatized by Momoka's remarks, causing him to believe Koyuki will never reciprocate him. Koyuki later asks Miki out for a one-on-one discussion when they hear Yota asking Minato nearby on dating Momoka. They then eavesdrop on Minato stating he only sees Koyuki as a friend, devastating her. After they leave, the girls clear up the confusion on their presumed relationships with the boys. Miki confides on her unwillingness to accept Yota's confession without reciprocating his feelings, even as Koyuki points out that Yota accepts her. Heading home, Koyuki reflects on misinterpreting Minato's affection, though she settles on rejecting her feelings for him and trying to remain friends alongside Miki and Yota. However, Minato is internally saddened at leading Koyuki on and their unchanging friendship, believing she has already rejected him.
16	2	"Stop and Go"; Transliteration: "Teishi to Shinkō" (Japanese: 停止と進行)	Takumi Yokoyama	Yasuhiro Nakanishi & Yū Ōshika	Shigenori Kageyama	October 8, 2026
Minato yearns to close the distance with Koyuki. He joins Momoka to a concert but hesitates to return her feelings. Miki assists Koyuki in deepening her relationship with Minato, though Koyuki insists on remaining friends. Wanting to be certain of how Koyuki feels, Minato invites her to an outing for summer break with Miki and Yota. Momoka boasts to Koyuki on her recent outing with Minato and her plans to continue bonding with him. Koyuki is reminded of Manatsu's actions, so she decides to not interfere while remaining wary of Momoka. Koyuki shares to Yota on wanting to get rid of her feelings for Minato, while Momoka asks Minato to be her boyfriend. The school conducts cultural festival preparations, where Koyuki casually talks to Minato and convinces herself on being content with their friendship. Momoka declares to Koyuki that she is now dating Minato, as it is revealed that Minato reluctantly accepted after she called him out on ignoring her and still waiting for Koyuki's response. Satisfied at settling her grudge against Koyuki, Momoka walks home with Minato, leaving behind a distraught Koyuki.
17	3	"True Feelings"; Transliteration: "Honshin" (Japanese: 本心)	Shigatsu Yoshikawa	Studio Kai & Kei Shimobayashi	Chihiro Kumano	October 15, 2026
Koyuki tries to distract herself by helping with the cultural festival. Miki confronts Minato and asks if he even loves Momoka; Minato refuses to answer, but insists he wants to try and get to know her better, while desperately hiding his feelings for Koyuki. Koyuki quietly laments on losing the chance to confess to Minato when Yuki brings her to Akine. Akine admits she had been made aware of Koyuki's crush on Minato through Yuki and apologizes for trying to turn her away to assist Momoka. Akine also discloses on wanting to grow close to the outgoing Yuki following her strained relationship with Manatsu, making Koyuki realize their similarities. She advises Akine to keep her head up high and remain friends with Yuki, as Koyuki and Minato are invited to a local festival. Upon confirming Momoka's absence, Minato joins Koyuki and their friends in its activities. Koyuki internalizes her feelings with the news while fetching drinks with Minato, as Minato remains unaware of her emotional struggles. Tsukiko points out their closeness, causing Koyuki to tearfully confide of her aimlessness in dealing with her feelings and becoming hurt with Momoka and Minato dating, shocking Tsukiko. Elsewhere, Tsubasa dines with his friends, where he contemplates his past relationship with Koyuki.
18	4	"Relief"; Transliteration: "Kankai" (Japanese: 緩解)	Tetsuaki Matsuda	Yū Ōshika	Shigenori Kageyama	October 22, 2026
Tsukiko points out to Koyuki that she never communicated her feelings for Minato clearly. Tsukiko asks her to be certain of wanting to date Minato before he can reciprocate Momoka's feelings. Meanwhile, Tsubasa recounts liking and dating Koyuki after facing peer pressure from his friends in middle school. He then became overbearing towards Koyuki while ignoring her discomfort, prompting Koyuki to break up with him. Koyuki also reflects on refusing Tsubasa's advances and being ignored by the people who claim to love her. Koyuki and Tsubasa encounter each other by chance, and they tensely discuss their middle school relationship. Koyuki calls Tsubasa out for only liking the idea of dating her and having a selfish and narrow mindset, though Tsubasa retorts at Koyuki having poor communication skills. After airing their grievances, the two acknowledge the shortcomings in their relationship and begin to speak as equals. Sometime later, Momoka views photos from Minato's festival outing and is silently enraged to see Koyuki close to him.
19	5	"Transition"; Transliteration: "Hensen" (Japanese: 変遷)	Teru Ishii	Yasuhiro Nakanishi	Teru Ishii	October 29, 2026
Miki reflects on her friends' changing relationships while hanging out. She sees Koyuki being able to talk to Minato despite her initial dismay, which Koyuki explains as wanting to understand her own feelings while not interfering in Minato and Momoka's relationship. Koyuki adds that she considers liking someone both romantically and as a friend important, causing Miki to recall Yota's confession and become flustered by it. Minato looks back on focusing on the feelings of others first before his own while noticing Koyuki becoming more approachable to him. He voices relief at their friendship being maintained as he constantly updates Momoka on his activities, completely unaware of Koyuki's growing feelings towards him. Minato's friends worriedly point out that Momoka may not trust him, though Minato ignores them and insists he will be a good boyfriend to her no matter the cost. Meanwhile, Momoka voices disdain at boys only dating her for their own pride, leaving her to aspire on feeling true love by becoming Minato's girlfriend. Despite this, Momoka scornfully views Koyuki as a hindrance and deduces Minato is not fully opening up his heart. Realizing Minato does not want to hurt the feelings of others, Momoka becomes increasingly clingy to him.
20	6	"Cultural Festival"; Transliteration: "Bunkamatsuri" (Japanese: 文化祭)	Ryūtarō Awabe	Studio Kai & Kei Shimobayashi	Ryūtarō Awabe	November 5, 2026
The cultural festival begins as Koyuki's class performs their play. Miki and Tsukiko continue to root for Koyuki and Minato's relationship, while Minato appears to have completely moved on. He prepares to meet Momoka for their date, though he shockingly feels sickened by it. Yota questions if he is happy with dating Momoka, but Minato is uncertain. The boys eat at Momoka's classroom cafe where Minato dissociates. Meanwhile, Koyuki and the girls see Minato and Momoka dating at the gym. Miki and Tsukiko worryingly ask if Koyuki remains determined on wanting to win Minato's love, prompting Miki to also wonder on Yota's current feelings; Yota remains completely oblivious to Miki's inner struggles. A frustrated Koyuki tells the girls she cannot move on from Minato despite her efforts, and the girls are unable to persuade her to find someone else. With the cultural festival coming to a close, Koyuki talks to Minato on his consideration for wanting lonely people to feel involved. She shares her appreciation for it, accepting that he had positively changed her mindset, which makes him flustered and happy. They share a laugh and head back, unaware that Momoka was eavesdropping them as she grows more resentful at Koyuki and Minato's friendship.
21	7	"Misunderstandings"; Transliteration: "Murikai" (Japanese: 無理解)	Mio Nishimura & Yurina Utsurogi	Yasuhiro Nakanishi	Kenji Setō	November 12, 2026
Momoka bluntly tells Koyuki to stay away from Minato. Koyuki agrees to keep her distance and states that she and Minato are only friends. Offended, a paranoid Momoka tries to rile up Koyuki to no avail, as Koyuki voices her displeasure with Momoka using her sociability to manipulate others for her own goals. She wishes Momoka and Minato to be happy in their relationship, but Momoka remains unfulfilled. Momoka later demands Minato during a date to stay away from Koyuki, and is disgusted to see Minato accept it in the same manner as Koyuki. Minato internalizes on the hardships of dating and who he truly loves more, leaving him further stressed. As he wonders on its source, he is surprised to find his formerly rebellious older brother Kaito return home. Kaito senses that Minato's stress is rooted from him stifling his true thoughts after witnessing Kaito's constant fights with their family as a young boy. Kaito adds that Minato should first discern his own beliefs and reconcile with himself, prompting Minato to look inward. Concluding that he cannot be truthful with himself while continuing to date Momoka, Minato aims to break off their relationship.
22	8	"Turning Points"; Transliteration: "Utsuri-me" (Japanese: 移り目)	Takumi Yokoyama	Yasuhiro Nakanishi	Chihiro Kumano	November 19, 2026
Koyuki aims to celebrate Minato's upcoming birthday when she learns of him and Momoka no longer being a couple. In a flashback, Minato met with Momoka for them to break up, with Minato now taking in its heaviness. Momoka, who quickly deduced his intentions, calls him out for not caring about her before leaving in frustration. Returning home, Momoka sullenly realized that Minato placed the effort in knowing her while she was focused on her own paranoia. In the present, Momoka strives to love herself first before finding a suitable partner. Koyuki worries for Minato's despondent demeanor and becomes conflicted on whether she should intervene. Miki plans a surprise birthday party for Minato with their friends to cheer him up, though Miki finds herself acting bashful around Yota. They then enjoy spending time together, culminating in Miki realizing she likes Yota and his genuine self and leaving her ecstatic for her newfound feelings.

== Reception ==
Before its serialization, The Ramparts of Ice received a special prize at the "Shueisha Shōjo Manga Grand Prix Powered by Line Manga Indies 2018 Summer". It ranked nineteenth in the web category at the seventh Next Manga Awards in 2021. It ranked first in the Comic CMoa Annual Ranking's josei manga category in 2022. It ranked second in AnimeJapan's sixth "Most Wanted Anime Adaptation" poll in 2023. It was nominated for the 69th Shogakukan Manga Award in 2023. (Note: Unlike previous years, the nominees are not divided into categories in the 2023 award.) It ranked fifteenth, along with The JoJoLands, on Takarajimasha's Kono Manga ga Sugoi! list of best manga of 2024 for male readers. It was ranked sixth in the Nationwide Bookstore Employees Recommended Comics of 2024 list. The series won the 2024 Vertical Manga Award in the completed comic category.

== See also ==
- You and I Are Polar Opposites, another manga series by the same author
