= Takane and Hana =

Japanese manga series and its franchise

- Cover of volume 1 as published in English

高嶺と花 (Takane to Hana)
- Genre: Romantic comedy
- Manga
- Written by: Yuki Shiwasu
- Published by: Hakusensha
- English publisher: Viz Media
- Magazine: Hana to Yume
- Original run: December 20, 2014 – July 20, 2020
- Volumes: 18
- Television drama
- Directed by: Yūsuke Ishii; Hiroyuki Nakata
- Written by: Juri Takeda; Iyo Nishikōri; Nana Yamamoto
- Original network: Fuji TV
- Original run: March 18, 2019 (on-demand); April 23, 2019; – June 18, 2019 (broadcast)
- Episodes: 8

Takane and Hana (Japanese: 高嶺と花, Hepburn: Takane to Hana) is a Japanese manga series written and illustrated by Yuki Shiwasu. The series was serialized in Hana to Yume from December 20, 2014, until July 20, 2020. The story follows the interactions of 16-year-old Hana Nonomura and 26-year-old Takane Saibara after Hana takes her sister's place in an arranged marriage meeting with Takane. The series received a live-action television series and a drama CD in 2019.

== Story ==
Hana Nonomura takes the place of her older sister in an arranged marriage meeting with Takane Saibara, the heir to the Takaba conglomerate where her father works. Despite his wealth and handsome exterior, Takane is actually rude and arrogant, which leads Hana to immediately end the meeting by throwing her disguise in his face. However, Takane is amused by Hana's disillusionment with him, and continues to pursue her even after learning that she is in fact not her adult sister. Takane tries to woo Hana by constantly taking her to fancy restaurants, elaborate trips, and buying opulent gifts as he pompously works to get her to cave in to him and his lifestyle. Takane and Hana come to enjoy their "arrangement" and through a constant battle of bickering with each other, come to learn about and care for one another.

== Characters ==
Hana Nonomura (野々村 花, Nonomura Hana)
Voiced by: Yurika Kubo (Drama CD), Played by: Aisa Takeuchi
Hana is a 16-year-old high schooler. She meets Takane when she takes her sister Yukari's place in an arranged marriage meeting with him. Hana immediately finds Takane's arrogant and spoiled personality obnoxious, to the point where she throws her wig in his face at the arranged marriage meeting. Hana reluctantly begins to hang out with Takane after school and in her spare time, but eventually becomes attached to their interactions.
Takane Saibara (才原 高嶺, Saibara Takane)
Voiced by: Kazuyuki Okitsu (Drama CD), Played by: Mahiro Takasugi
Takane is a 26-year-old, and later 27-year-old, business man and grandson of Takaba Corporation head Soten Takaba. Takane keeps Hana around after their initial meeting because he likes that Hana doesn't like him for his wealth or looks. He often takes her to expensive restaurants, picks her up in his European sports car, and brings her dozens of roses. This is not because he has romantic feelings for her, but to make her cave in to enjoying an opulent lifestyle and feel indebted to Takane. Despite his arrogant attitude, Takane is actually excellent at his job and is often praised by his coworkers, saying the firm would fall apart without him. Takane wakes up very early, around 5 a.m., and likes to jog in the morning. He also stays up late working on work-related matters.
Nicola Luciano (ニコラ・ルチアーノ, Nicola Luciano)
Voiced by: Takahiro Sakurai (Drama CD), Played by: Asahi Ito
Nicola is Takane's college friend and the heir of a famous Italian fashion company. After his introduction, he moves to Japan as the president of the Japanese branch of his family business, as he studied in Japan and knows the language. Nicola later frequents Okamon's family's restaurant, where Okamon's little brother is fond of him. He is often seen with many women around him and has an extroverted and fun personality. Despite seeming carefree, he cares for Takane and often looks after him. He frequently flirts with Hana's friend Mizuki, and eventually seems to form genuine feelings for her.
Soma Okamoto (岡本 颯馬, Okamoto Souma)
Voiced by: Yuma Uchida (Drama CD), Played by: Kenshin Endō
Nicknamed "Okamon" by Hana and his classmates, he is Hana's childhood friend. His family runs an okonomiyaki restaurant. He is often annoyed by Takane, in part to Takane's personality and also because of his closeness to Hana. Okamon later confesses his romantic feelings for Hana. He is in the soccer club.
Yukari Nonomura (野々村 縁, Nonomura Yukari)
Voiced by: Mai Nakahara (Drama CD), Played by: Arisa Deguchi
Hana's airheaded and boy-crazy sister, who gets into an arranged marriage meeting with Takane when she delivers lunch to her dad's office at one of the subsidiaries of the Takaba Corporation. Soten Takaba, Takane's grandfather and head of the Takaba Corporation, sees Yukari's beauty and sets him up with her. However, at the time Yukari already has a boyfriend and refuses to go, hence why Hana goes in her place. She works as a receptionist at a department store.
Mizuki Ogawa (小川 水希, Ogawa Mizuki)
Voiced by: Ayaka Asai (Drama CD), Played by: Yū Miyazaki
Hana's friend from school. She has freckles and short hair, and has two brash younger brothers. She has a brash personality but is not very confident about her femininity, and has reservations in admitting her crush to Luciano, since she thinks he's a playboy who flirts with every girl he meets.
Hikaruko Fujiwara (藤原 光子, Fujiwara Hikaruko)
Voiced by: Miyuri Shimabukuro (Drama CD), Played by: Rea Nagami
Hana's friend from school. She wears glasses and has black hair she wears in braids, and has a cynical but friendly personality. At a party at Luciano's house she befriends and starts to keep in touch with Take Jun, a member of the famous boy band Soyokaze, though she seems to keep her cool about it.
Eiji Kirigasaki (霧ヶ崎 瑛二, Kirigasaki Eiji)
Played by: Junki Tozuka
Eiji is initially introduced as a worker for the Takaba Corporation sent by Takane's uncle to see if Takane's arranged marriage partner is really who he says she is. Eiji later apologizes and becomes Takane's personal assistant as well as keeper of his secret with Hana.
Shigeru Nonomura
Played by: Ryō Nishihori
Hana's father, he works at one of the smaller offices of the Takaba Corporation.
Emi Nonomura
Played by: Yūko Nitō
Hana's mother, a housewife. She is sympathetic to Hana's situation with Takane and respects him.
Soten Takaba (鷹羽 蒼天, Takaba Souten)
Played by: Toru Shinagawa
Takane's elderly grandfather and president of the Takaba Corporation. Despite himself claiming elderly behaviors like poor eyesight (he can't tell Yukari and Hana apart), he seems apt at physical activities like golfing. He often asks Takane about his arranged marriage with Yukari and pressures him to have it move along, eventually to the point of tricking him to living with Hana and the whole Nonomura family.
Hiromi Takaba (鷹羽 大海, Takaba Hiromi)
Takane's young cousin who is obsessed with Takane. He already resembles Takane (or rather Takane's small form "Hikune") but styles his hair to be wavy like Takane's.
Rino Inokuma (猪熊 りの, Inokuma Rino)
Voiced by: Romi Park (Drama CD)
Takane's high school classmate, she is transgender and has romantic feelings for Takane. She admires him because he once told her to be true to herself and embrace her gender identity.
Yakumo Takaba
Takane's cousin who has envied Takane for a long time. He seems to want to reconnect with Takane as adults after not seeing each other for many years, but actually has ill plans to hurt Hana and expose Takane's marriage arrangement with her.

== Media ==
It was announced on January 19, 2019, that the series would receive a live-action television series. The series was first viewable on-demand on Fuji Television on Demand (FOD), and later run on a repeated time slot. The series debuted on March 18, 2019. A drama CD was bundled with the 13th volume of the manga on February 20, 2019. The manga is licensed in English by Viz Media under their Shojo Beat imprint.

Manga

Volume 18 special edition includes a booklet with an epilogue chapter set 7 years after the main story.

== Reception ==
The manga ranked on Takarajimasha's Kono Manga ga Sugoi! 2016 list of best manga for female readers. The series has over 2 million copies in print as of September 2019.

== See also ==
- Tamon's B-Side, another manga series by the same author
