= Kakeru Hatano =

Japanese voice actor

- 波多野 翔
- Born: May 6, 2000 (age 26); Niigata Prefecture, Japan
- Occupation: Voice actor
- Agent: Amuse Inc.
- Notable work: Tamon's B-Side as Tamon Fukuhara; Yowayowa Sensei as Akihito Abikura

Kakeru Hatano (波多野 翔, Hatano Kakeru; born May 6, 2000) is a Japanese voice actor from Niigata Prefecture who is affiliated with Amuse Inc.. He made his voice acting debut as the character Shizu Kawawa in Arcanamusica, a mixed-media project co-produced by Shueisha and Avex. He is known for his roles as Tamon Fukuhara in Tamon's B-Side, Yūki Azumi in The Ramparts of Ice, and Akihito Abikura in Yowayowa Sensei.

== Filmography ==
=== Anime ===
2024

- Blue Lock, Nijiro Nanase

2025

- Wind Breaker, Akihito Miyoshi

2026

- Tamon's B-Side, Tamon Fukuhara
- The Ramparts of Ice, Yūki Azumi
- Yowayowa Sensei, Akihito Abikura

2027

- Just Like Mona Lisa
