= Tamon's B-Side =

Japanese manga series

- First tankōbon volume cover, featuring Tamon Fukuhara (left) and Utage Kinoshita (right)

多聞くん今どっち!? (Tamon-kun Ima Dotchi!?)
- Genre: Romantic comedy
- Manga
- Written by: Yuki Shiwasu
- Published by: Hakusensha
- English publisher: NA: Viz Media
- Imprint: Hana to Yume Comics
- Magazine: Hana to Yume
- Original run: October 20, 2021 – present
- Volumes: 17
- Manga

Tamon's B-Side: F/ACE Off Stage!
- Written by: Uzu Natsuno
- Published by: Hakusensha
- Imprint: Hana to Yume Comics
- Magazine: The Hana to Yume Numa
- Original run: July 26, 2025 – present
- Volumes: 1
- Anime television series
- Directed by: Chika Nagaoka
- Written by: Chiaki Nagai
- Music by: Takashi Ōmama; Natsumi Tabuchi
- Studio: J.C.Staff
- Licensed by: Crunchyroll: SA/SEA: Medialink
- Original network: Tokyo MX, BS11
- Original run: January 4, 2026 – present
- Episodes: 13
- icon

Tamon's B-Side (Japanese: 多聞くん今どっち!?, Hepburn: Tamon-kun Ima Dotchi!?; lit. 'Which Tamon Am I Seeing Now?!') is a Japanese manga series written and illustrated by Yuki Shiwasu. It was originally a one-shot published in Hakusensha's shōjo manga magazine Hana to Yume in August 2021, before being serialized in the same magazine from October of the same year. An anime television series adaptation produced by J.C.Staff aired from January to March 2026. A second season has been announced.

== Plot ==
Utage Kinoshita is an excitable high school student who supports Tamon Fukuhara, a wildly popular member of the idol group F/ACE. To Utage, Tamon is a flawless, radiant idol who gives her the motivation to get through daily life. Utage works as a part-time housekeeper, and is assigned a new client when a coworker gets sick. To her surprise, this new client is Tamon, and she quickly discovers that behind his perfect public image, he is deeply insecure, pessimistic, gloomy, and has no friends. As Utage becomes involved in Tamon's private life, she works to support him through his self-doubt and fear of failing his fans, while struggling to reconcile the contrast between his idol persona and his true self.

== Characters ==
Utage Kinoshita (木下 うたげ, Kinoshita Utage)
Voiced by: Maika Sasaki (voice drama), Saori Hayami (anime) (Japanese); Abigail Blythe (English)
A 17-year-old (Note: Utage is stated to be 17 going on 18 in the manga, but 16 in the anime adaptation.) high school girl and an avid fan of Tamon, Utage works part-time as a housekeeper for her oshikatsu. She was initially assigned to Tamon's house to cover the absence of her co-worker before officially hired as his housekeeper. She would do anything to keep Tamon retaining his idol job, including scolding him every-time Tamon says any negative remarks about himself or maintaining her distance with Tamon as a fan. One of the running gags is that she frequently drops her uchiwa and somebody else ends up picking it up for her.
Hayami stated that Utage is expressive and sometimes out of control. However, deep down, she has a big heart and straight-forward personality, which makes her an adorable character.
Tamon Fukuhara (福原 多聞, Fukuhara Tamon)
Voiced by: Takuya Eguchi (voice drama), Kakeru Hatano (anime) (Japanese); Conner Allison (English)
Portrayed by: Kanata Narabayashi
The 18-year-old titular character, Tamon is the "wild boy" member of idol group F/ACE who portrays a confident and bold persona in public. On the inside, he has low self-esteem with his public image being a character forced upon him by his agency. Despite this, his feelings towards being an idol and his fans are genuine. Utage discovers his true personality after being sent to work for him, and decides to stick to his side to support him. She refers this side of Tamon as "Gloomyhara" (ジメ原, Jimehara) and his idol persona as "Hottiehara" (イケ原, Ikehara). Tamon grows to value Utage and starts to become conscious of Utage's life—sometimes becoming possessive of her in a side known as "Darkhara" (ヤミ原, Yamihara). One of the running gags is that when he becomes gloomy, mushrooms grow around him, literally turning his room muggy. Tamon has an older brother, Daiki, who inspired him to pursue an idol career.

=== F/ACE ===
Ouri Sakaguchi (坂口 桜利, Sakaguchi Ōri)
Voiced by: Toshiki Masuda (voice drama), Shōya Chiba (anime) (Japanese); Brandon Acosta (English)
Portrayed by: Haruki Mochida
Ouri is the 17-year-old "prince" member who portrays a close relationship with Tamon. Born from family of entertainers, he has been active in the industry since a child and has many long-time fans. Popular for his refined and well-mannered demeanor, Ouri's true personality is that of a proud, arrogant, and violent man. He sees through Tamon's timidity and looks down on him, though both of them eventually become closer. Despite being initially hostile towards Utage, he eventually falls in love with her and has been trying to win her heart.
Keito Tachibana (橘 敬人, Tachibana Keito)
Voiced by: Tasuku Hatanaka (Japanese); Cody Savoie (English)
Portrayed by: Kōhei Kamiyama
The leader and later center of F/ACE, he is 21 years old. (Note: Keito is stated to be 21 in the manga, but 20 in the anime adaptation.) On the outside, he is a friendly and gentle young man who is excellent at cooking, with his own cooking show. However, Keito is ruthless and only sees his fans as a source of income. He wears glasses in private. Wanting to make money, he is strict against scandals and was initially unaware of Utage, but eventually comes to accept her as Tamon's emotional support. His intense obsession with money stems from his desire to send his five younger brothers to college and to make things easier for his parents.
Natsuki Ishibashi (石橋 ナツキ, Ishibashi Natsuki)
Voiced by: Kōhei Amasaki (Japanese); Kevin D. Thelwell (English)
Portrayed by: Yūri Takahashi
The "cute" member of F/ACE who is 20 years old. Fashionable and multi-talented, he produces his own cosmetics and composes his own music. His true personality is that of someone who likes cigarettes, alcohol, and pachinko. Being from Kansai region, he speaks in Kansai dialect in private. As a teenager, he indirectly caused injury to his then-girlfriend Asuka, which forced her to withdraw from an important martial arts match. Despite his growing success as an idol, he feels guilty and is unable to fully devote himself to his activities.
Rintarō Kai (甲斐 倫太郎, Kai Rintarō)
Voiced by: Ryūho Nagaoka (Japanese); Alex Hom (English)
Portrayed by: Sora Yamato
The 19-year-old rapper of F/ACE, Rintarō is the tallest and physically the strongest member of the group, and is active in sports and entertainment programs and as a model. He is quiet, cool, and mysterious, which is his charm. His true personality is that of a talkative otaku who cannot help but talk nonstop about his favorite anime, "Sushi Musume" and his favorite character Kanpyo Roll. Rintarō became an idol because, like anime, he can evoke "emotions and stories that would not happen in normal life." Unlike the other members, he neither creates an idol persona nor talks much when he is nervous.

=== Others ===
Wataru Fujita (藤田 渉, Fujita Wataru)
Voiced by: Masaaki Mizunaka (Japanese); Aaron Campbell (English)
Portrayed by: Taizō Shiina
The 32-year-old manager of F/ACE, Fujita is under a constant state of stress having to manage its members who all have personality quirks that are difficult to work with. He is aware that Utage's actions in support of Tamon go outside her job for doing household chores or even what a normal idol fan would be allowed, and approves of it. He acknowledges Utage has had a positive effect on Tamon, making him come out of his shell, which by proxy makes his own managerial job easier.
Izumi Shiraishi (白石 泉, Shiraishi Izumi)
Voiced by: Takako Honda (Japanese); Marwa Elda (English)
The producer of F/ACE whom Tamon is scared of due to her strict personality. She does this to raise the group's popularity.
Yuina (結菜) and Riko (莉子)
Voiced by: Saya Fukuzumi (Yuina), Yurika Hirayama (Riko) (Japanese); Kayla Temshiv (Yuina), Taylor Murphy (Riko) (English)
Utage's best friends at school and fellow fans of Tamon who are oblivious of Utage's connection with F/ACE.
Homare Kinoshita (木下 ほまれ, Kinoshita Homare)
Voiced by: Runa Sasaki (Japanese); Rebecca Chiara Marano (English)
Homare is Utage's riajū younger sister who cannot understand her older sister's obsession over an idol. She would rather be idolized by other people instead. Nevertheless, Homare eventually becomes a fan of F/ACE herself and has Keito as her favorite member.
Yamato Kinoshita (木下 やまと, Kinoshita Yamato)
Voiced by: Ayaka Nanase (Japanese); Emily Neves (English)
Yamato is Utage's younger brother and Homare's twin brother who cannot understand his older sister's obsession over an idol either. He prefers to focus on studies instead.
Asuka Inoue (井上 飛鳥, Inoue Asuka)
Voiced by: Misato Matsuoka
The 22-year-old new teacher at Utage's school, Asuka is a fellow F/ACE fan whose favorite member is Natsuki. She and Natsuki are ex-lovers. Asuka continues to support him even after the two grew apart.
Rinka Kai (甲斐 凜花, Kai Rinka)
Rintarō's 17-year-old younger sister who is against her brother's profession. Rinka ran away from home and ended up befriending the wrong people. After Rintarō and Utage save her, she understands her brother's choice and becomes a fan of F/ACE, as well as a friend to Utage.
Daiki Fukuhara (福原 大樹, Fukuhara Daiki)
Tamon's 28-year-old brother whom occasionally gets mistaken for his younger brother. During college, he took Tamon to Tokyo and introduced him to dancing, which inspired him to become an idol. Despite having a talent in dancing himself, he chose to pursue a steady career instead. Daiki is married to his long-time girlfriend, Sayuri, and a father to one daughter, Momo.

== Media ==
=== Manga ===
Written and illustrated by Yuki Shiwasu, Tamon's B-Side was initially a one-shot published in Hakusensha's Hana to Yume magazine on August 5, 2021. It began its serialization in the same magazine on October 20 of the same year. As of October 2026, seventeen tankōbon volumes have been released.

In February 2023, Viz Media announced that they licensed the series for English publication; the first volume was released on October 3 of the same year.

A spin-off manga written and illustrated by Uzu Natsuno, titled Tamon's B-Side: F/ACE Off Stage! (多聞くん今どっち!? F/ACEオフステージ！, Tamon-kun Ima Dotchi!? F/ACE Ofu Sutēji!), began serialization in Hakusensha's The Hana to Yume Numa magazine on July 26, 2025. The spin-off is centered around the activities of the boy band F/ACE. The first tankōbon volume was released on March 19, 2026.

==== Volumes ====
===== Tamon's B-Side =====
No.	Original release date	Original ISBN	English release date	English ISBN
1	February 18, 2022	978-4-592-22426-6	October 3, 2023	978-1-9747-3905-9
2	May 20, 2022	978-4-592-22427-3	January 2, 2024	978-1-9747-4296-7
3	October 20, 2022	978-4-592-22428-0	April 2, 2024	978-1-9747-4348-3
4	February 20, 2023	978-4-592-22429-7	July 2, 2024	978-1-9747-4617-0
5	June 20, 2023	978-4-592-22430-3; 978-4-592-22887-5 (SE)	October 1, 2024	978-1-9747-4916-4
6	September 20, 2023	978-4-592-22465-5	January 7, 2025	978-1-9747-5170-9
7	January 19, 2024	978-4-592-22473-0	April 1, 2025	978-1-9747-5236-2
8	June 20, 2024	978-4-592-22489-1; 978-4-592-23022-9 (SE)	July 1, 2025	978-1-9747-5531-8
9	September 20, 2024	978-4-592-22499-0	October 7, 2025	978-1-9747-5915-6
10	January 20, 2025	978-4-592-22513-3	January 6, 2026	978-1-9747-6124-1
11	June 20, 2025	978-4-592-22536-2	June 2, 2026	978-1-9747-1670-8
12	October 20, 2025	978-4-592-22548-5	November 3, 2026	978-1-9747-6666-6
13	January 20, 2026	978-4-592-22556-0	February 2, 2027	978-1-9747-6962-9
14	February 20, 2026	978-4-592-22557-7	—	—
15	March 19, 2026	978-4-592-22558-4	—	—
16	June 19, 2026	978-4-592-22584-3	—	—
17	October 20, 2026	978-4-592-22591-1; 978-4-592-23138-7 (SE)	—	—

===== Tamon's B-Side: F/ACE Off Stage! =====
No.	Japanese release date	Japanese ISBN
1	March 19, 2026	978-4-592-22572-0

=== Anime ===
An anime television series adaptation was announced on June 12, 2024. It is produced by J.C.Staff and directed by Chika Nagaoka, with series composition and episode scripts written by Chiaki Nagai, characters designed by Yōko Itō, who also served as chief animation director, and music composed by Takashi Ōmama and Natsumi Tabuchi. The series aired from January 4 to March 29, 2026, on Tokyo MX and BS11. (Note: Tokyo MX and BS11 listed the series premiere on January 3 at 25:00 JST, which is effectively January 4 at 1:00 a.m. JST.) The opening theme song is "Sweet Magic", and the ending theme song is "Hana to Yume" (花と夢), both performed by the in-universe boy band F/ACE. Crunchyroll is streaming the series. Medialink licensed the series in South, Southeast Asia and Oceania (except Australia and New Zealand) for streaming on Ani-One Asia's YouTube channel.

A second season was announced on November 21, 2026.

==== Episodes ====
No.	Title	Directed by (Note: Production staff information is taken from the ending credits of each episode.)	Storyboarded by	Original release date (Note: Episodes are released on U-Next, Anime Hōdai, Crunchyroll, and Ani-One Asia three days before their televised airings, except for the season finale which was pre-released two days before (March 27).)
1	"You Need Money to Support Your Oshi!"; Transliteration: "Oshi o Osu ni wa Kane ga Iru!" (Japanese: 推しを推すには金が要る！)	Chika Nagaoka	Chika Nagaoka	January 4, 2026
Utage Kinoshita, a high school girl and superfan of the idol Tamon Fukuhara from F/ACE, is called to work to fill in for Toda, who had an emergency surgery. Utage is assigned to clean Tamon's apartment and finds out that he actually has a gloomy personality in contrast to his bold persona in public. As Utage cleans the apartment, she tells Tamon how big of a fan she is, while also cooking meals for him. A few days later, Utage returns to the apartment and accidentally falls on top of Tamon as F/ACE's manager Wataru Fujita walks in, causing Utage to run away dejected. The next day, a news report comes out of an idol being attacked by a stalker, making Utage reluctant to work for him again, especially with Toda discharged from the hospital and ready to be his housekeeper as planned. Utage attends the next F/ACE concert as just another fan, and during an intermission Utage is taken backstage by Tamon. He asks Utage to continue working as his housekeeper, realizing that he needs her to keep him motivated, and she accepts.
2	"Do You Like Me?"; Transliteration: "Ore no Koto Suki?" (Japanese: 俺のこと好き？)	Yūta Maruyama	Chika Nagaoka	January 11, 2026
With a fan interaction event for F/ACE coming, Tamon expresses his reluctance to attend towards Fujita as Utage arrives for work. Utage manages to motivate Tamon into attending the event. At the event, Utage gets in an argument with two other Tamon fans that causes them to get ejected from the event before meeting Tamon. After returning from the event, Utage reports to work and sees Tamon waiting for her to have their meet-and-greet. Sometime later, Utage and Tamon go shopping for new clothes together with Tamon wearing a paper bag on his head. Afterwards, the two have a drink at a cafe and Utage's high school friends show up not knowing that she is with Tamon, causing him to run out and drag Utage away. A few days later, Tamon attempts to make a rolled omelet and fails that has him thinking about going on hiatus until Utage tells him that not everybody will go well on the first try. Fujita appears having listened in on their conversation. Fujita commends Utage for helping Tamon get out of his nervous breakdown mode and tells her to continue working as Tamon's housekeeper.
3	"You're One of Those Insane Fans"; Transliteration: "Temee, Yabee Fan da na" (Japanese: テメェ、やべェファンだな)	Daisuke Tsukushi	Daisuke Tsukushi	January 18, 2026
On the way home from Tamon's apartment, Utage bumps into Ouri Sakaguchi, the prince of F/ACE, causing her to drop her homemade fan. Utage returns to Tamon's apartment to retrieve it and sees Ouri hitting Tamon with it, finding out that in contrast to his public appearance as a polite man, he actually has a violent personality. Utage throws Ouri out, only for him to break the door down and give Tamon a harsh scolding. As Utage leaves, Ouri warns her to not tell anybody about his true personality, and Utage vows to never see speak of him again as she has no interest in him. Days later, summer break begins, and F/ACE announces a competition to choose a center. Utage and her friends watch the first episode together at her house, and Tamon struggles in the first round of competitions. Utage comes to Tamon's apartment after the competition to clean up his place that is infested with mushrooms growing on the walls. As Utage picks the mushrooms, Ouri barges in and tells Utage that if he becomes the center, she will be his housekeeper instead.
4	"You're a Sniper of Love"; Transliteration: "Anata wa Koi no Sunaipā" (Japanese: あなたは恋のスナイパー)	Mayo Nozaki	Mayo Nozaki	January 25, 2026
Utage accepts Ouri's proposal to be his housekeeper instead of Tamon's if he wins the center. After Ouri leaves, Tamon asks Utage to go out together on a date at the summer festival wanting to understand what love is having never experienced it with a single person. On the night of the festival, Tamon wears a wig and a mask, while Ouri follows the two in secret. After spending some time enjoying the festivities, Tamon goes off and Ouri approaches Utage asking if Tamon is her boyfriend, which she denies. When Tamon returns, he tells Ouri that Utage is his girlfriend and drags her away. While the two are alone, Utage and Tamon agree to perceive each other as just ordinary people as the two enjoy the rest of the festival as such. The night concludes with the fireworks show as Tamon surprises Utage by calling her Uta-chan instead of Kinoshita. The next day, Tamon wins the second round of the center competition and seemingly forgets what Utage taught her about love in his victory speech.
5	"Rain"	Hiroyasu Oda	Mashami Watanabe	February 1, 2026
Utage is called in to do housekeeping for Ouri's mansion even though the competition for the center is still ongoing. Ouri collapses with a fever and rests in bed while Utage cleans his mansion. Afterwards, Utage cleans Tamon's apartment and inform him about Ouri's fever. The next day, Utage returns to Ouri's mansion and Tamon comes over to help clean. As the two clean the swimming pool, Tamon talks about his history with Ouri. Tamon won an audition and Ouri has since sought to surpass him. The center competition continues with Ouri winning the third round and Tamon winning the fourth round. As the idols prepare for the fifth and final round, a singing competition, Ouri rescinds his demand if he wins center and instead, simply asks Utage to be his fan. After the final round, the idols are informed assigned their roles for the upcoming N Station's Summer Fes event with neither Tamon nor Ouri winning the center due to their tendencies to overwork themselves. On the day of the event, F/ACE debuts its new song, Rain, with Keito Tachibana revealed as the center.
6	"Tamon's B-Side"; Transliteration: "Tamon-kun Ima Dotchi!?" (Japanese: 多聞くん今どっち！？)	Akiko Sano	Mie Ōishi	February 8, 2026
While walking her dog Pochi a few days after the event, Utage spots Tamon on the roof of the apartment complex all depressed after failing to become the center and has been in deep depression since. Tamon tells Utage that he being near Ouri has been causing him to lose his will to live but asks Utage to continue being his fan. Utage suddenly collapses, causing Keito, who lives in the same apartment complex, to come to the roof to see what is happening. The next day, Keito reveals his true personality, a money-making miser, and tells Ouri about what happened on the roof that day. Sometime later, Utage finds Tamon collapsed in the kitchen after attempting to make a cake and causing an explosion. Utage helps Tamon make a cake as a way to cheer him up from the center competition. While eating the cake, Utage realizes that Tamon is being overdependent on her and thinks he needs to survive on his own. As Utage leaves, Tamon licks the frosting on her face causing her to become flustered.
7	"Fans Are Terrifying Creatures"; Transliteration: "Otaku to wa Osoroshii Ikimono da" (Japanese: オタクとは恐ろしい生き物だ)	Yūki Morita	Hiroaki Sakurai	February 15, 2026
The next day, Utage passes by Rintaro Kai leaving a hobby shop in disguise on the streets, then unexpectedly runs into Tamon by the shop's gashapon machine. The two then eat sandwiches from a place where F/ACE had a location shoot, go shopping together, then watch a F/ACE documentary at a movie theater. Sometime later, Utage heads to Tamon's apartment and ends up in Keito's apartment instead with Tamon and Ouri. Utage finds out about Keito's true personality as a money-making miser and told about how dangerous it is for idols getting too close to fangirls in public due to the potential for scandals, and as such demands Utage to stay away from Tamon. Utage responds by saying that Fujita hired her to be Tamon's housekeeper. Fujita suddenly appears and asks Utage to fill in for a staff member with F/ACE's training camp where the idols are doing a film shoot, which she begrudgingly accepts.
8	"F/ACE and the Summer Vacation"; Transliteration: "F/ACE to Natsu Tabi" (Japanese: F/ACEとナツ旅)	Daisuke Tsukushi	Kōichi Takada	February 22, 2026
F/ACE travels to a seaside resort town for a film shoot with Utage there as a temporary staff member. After the first filming session, Utage checks up on the idols. After the evening session, Ouri calls Utage to retrieve her handmade fans that she left inside his hotel room and hides in his bed when Keito comes in suspecting that Utage snuck into Ouri's room. The next day, filming continues as the idols sightsee during the day and do a test of courage at night. Utage is sent to the storage shed that closes and locks behind her. Tamon opens it but also gets locked in himself. After the two get out, the director admits that he rigged the shed doors wanting to see Tamon genuinely surprised. On the final day of the shoot, Keito reveals that does whatever he can to provide for his five brothers, which includes cooking. That night, Utage and Tamon talk privately at the beach about not doing summery things this trip. Utage gets soaked and as Tamon tries to warm her up, Ouri sees them and runs away suspecting that they have a romantic relationship.
9	"I'm the One Who's Gonna Win"; Transliteration: "Katsu no wa Ore da" (Japanese: 勝つのは俺だ)	Akiko Sano	Mie Ōishi	March 1, 2026
With summer vacation winding down, Utage goes out to find a quiet place to do her summer homework. She runs into Tamon returning home after picking up his school uniform from the dry cleaners, while Ouri follows Utage around trying to find out if Utage has any romantic relationship with Tamon. Keito spots the two and offers his apartment as a place to study. Utage and Tamon spend the day alone in Keito's apartment, and Tamon asks Utage to support the real Tamon, and not just his public persona. Meanwhile as Ouri spies on Utage, he recalls his upbringing as he is the son of a famous actor and popular singer. His aggressive personality came from his parents telling him to become a winner. Ouri breaks into the apartment and helps Utage with her homework while Tamon goes out to the convenience store. When Tamon returns, he sees that Ouri getting too close to Tamon, and Utage responds by telling Tamon and Ouri that they both have their own fans. After hearing that, Ouri starts to develop feelings for Utage.
10	"Yellow Spring"; Transliteration: "Iebe Haru" (Japanese: イエベ春)	Yasunori Ban & Chika Nagaoka	Ei Tanaka	March 8, 2026
Utage returns to school after summer break with Asuka Inoue taking over as the homeroom teacher. Utage finds out that Asuka is a huge fan of Natsuki Ishibashi, the angel of F/ACE. After school, Utage cleans Tamon's apartment and learns that Natsuki is the idol group's songwriter. Keito comes in telling Utage and Tamon that Natsuki is missing when he should be writing F/ACE's next song. After searching all night with Natsuki having spent the night playing pachinko, Natsuki returns to his apartment, revealing that he is a heavy drinker, smoker, and gambler. The next day, Utage is put in charge of running a food stall for her class at the upcoming culture festival. After school, Utage and Asuka talk about the food stall. Meanwhile Natsuki submits his lyrics that get rejected, but Tamon motivates him to keep working. That night, Tamon asks Utage what she meant by being hurt if Tamon disliked her with Utage refusing to give a direct answer. The next day, Asuka chases Natsuki and throws him to the ground with a judo move mistaking him for a stalker, and Natsuki tells Utage that Asuka is his ex-girlfriend.
11	"Is It Really Okay for Me to Be Here?"; Transliteration: "Koko ni Ite Eenka na" (Japanese: ここにいてええんかな)	Yutaka Yamamoto	Mashami Watanabe	March 15, 2026
While working in Tamon's apartment again, Natsuki comes in and tells Utage about his relationship with Asuka. Back in middle school in Kansai, Natsuki was neglected by his parents and ran away from home, becoming a homeless street performer. One day, Asuka showed kindness to him and her family took him in, working part-time at her family's takoyaki shop. The two bonded like siblings as Asuka trained hard and advanced to the high school judo finals, while Natsuki worked to make it as a singer. However, one day Asuka injured herself protecting Natsuki from his father, forcing her to miss the tournament and Natsuki has since blamed himself for that. He kept his distance, eventually joining F/ACE. In the present, Utage and Tamon spy on Asuka and they learn that Asuka still cares greatly for him despite what happened. With Natsuki's concerns about Asuka being the source of his songwriting troubles, Utage asks her to tell Natsuki how she really feels about him and does so through texts. The next day, Natsuki tells Utage that F/ACE will be attending her school's cultural festival as Keito is an alum of her school.
12	"Fly"	Hiroyasu Oda	Yoshinobu Yamakawa	March 22, 2026
The cultural festival begins with Utage enjoying the festivities while running into the F/ACE idols, who are attending with their faces covered. Tamon and Ouri tell Utage that they are attending a cultural festival for the first time, while Keito explains that the cafe that went viral is where he learned to cook and worked the longest as a part-timer. Sometime later, F/ACE goes on-stage to announce their first flagship show, F/ACE School, and debut the show's theme song that Natsuki just finished writing, Fly, with a live performance. After the festival while the students are attending the after party, Asuka and Natsuki make up, while Utage does cleanup duty in the classroom. Tamon comes into the classroom and Utage starts having thoughts of what school life would have been like if she attended the same school as Tamon. Hiding from the students coming back from the after party, Utage starts feeling uneasy with her impure thoughts of falling in love with Tamon. Afterwards, Utage, not wanting to harm Tamon with her thoughts, rushes to her workplace to inform her employer that she is quitting.
13	"I've Made Up My Mind"; Transliteration: "Watashi, Hara o Kukurimasu" (Japanese: わたし、腹を括ります。)	Chika Nagaoka	Kōichi Takada & Chika Nagaoka	March 29, 2026
Having quit her job, Utage packs away the F/ACE merchandise in her room hoping to forget about her time spent with Tamon. However, Utage runs into Tamon again in front of her house. Concerned about her quitting so suddenly, Tamon secretly followed her from school. Tamon meets her younger siblings Homare and Yamato as they clean the house together while Utage walks Pochi. Homare tells Tamon that Utage learned how to cook and clean because their parents are often busy with work. When Utage returns, Tamon shows her the recipe notebook that has her remembering why she became a housekeeper. The next day, Utage rushes over to Tamon's apartment after Fujita tells her that he passed out from a cold. Tamon pulls Utage into his apartment while hallucinating Utage everywhere. Utage spends the day cleaning and caring for Tamon while he rests. Ouri, Keito, and Natsuki come in to help and ask Utage to resume her job as his housekeeper. After reminding her about the pride she puts into her work, Utage agrees. Her employer calls her to fill in for Toda after injuring herself and accepts to resume her job.

=== F/ACE discography ===
==== Studio albums ====
Title	Album details	Peak chart positions			Sales
Title	Album details	JPN	JPN Comb.	JPN Hot	Sales
Nautical Star	Released: April 8, 2026; Label: King Records; Formats: CD, digital download, streaming	5	8	89	JPN: 11,244

==== Singles ====
Title	Year	Album
"Eyes on You"	2024	Nautical Star
"F/ACE Off"	2025	Nautical Star
"Supernova"	2025	Nautical Star
"Sweet Magic"	2026	Nautical Star
"Hana to Yume" (花と夢)	2026	Nautical Star
"Rain"	2026	Nautical Star
"Fly"	2026	Nautical Star

=== Stage play ===
A stage play adaptation was announced on March 5, 2026. It was directed by Yū Fukuzawa based on a screenplay by Keita Kawajiri, with Yoshihiko Aramaki serving as the producer. The play, titled Tamon-kun Ima Docchi!? The Stage, ran at the Tennozu Galaxy Theater in Tokyo from September 11–23, 2026. Prior to the play, the main cast members released a music video for their pre-debut song "Bloom" and held two live events under the name F/ACE from the Stage.

==== Stage play discography ====
Title	Year
"Bloom"	2026
"Light Up"	2026
"I Don't Wanna Let You Go"	2026
"Firestorm"	2026
"Dare"	2026
"No Limits"	2026
"Starting Over"	2026
"Smile F/ACE"	2026
"I Miss You"	2026
"Kira-X Squad"	2026
"Gravity"	2026

=== Other media ===
A voice drama adaptation, featuring Takuya Eguchi, Toshiki Masuda, and =Love member Maika Sasaki, was included in an issue of Hana to Yume published on October 20, 2022.

== Reception ==
By December 2025, Tamon's B-Side had over 1.75 million copies in circulation, including digital versions; by January 2026, it had over 2.6 million copies in circulation, including digital versions; by June 2026, it had over 3.5 million copies in circulation. In 2022, the series was nominated for the Next Manga Awards in the Print Manga category, where it placed 11th out of 50 nominees. It ranked sixth for the same award in the following year. The series ranked ninth in the 2023 edition of Takarajimasha's Kono Manga ga Sugoi! list of best manga for female readers. It also ranked fourth in the "Nationwide Publishers Recommended Comics of 2023" list. The series was nominated for the 47th Kodansha Manga Award in the shōjo category.

== See also ==
- Takane and Hana, another manga series by the same author
