= Yowayowa Sensei =

Japanese manga series

- First tankōbon volume cover, featuring Hiyori Hiwamura

よわよわ先生 (Yowayowa Sensei)
- Genre: Romantic comedy
- Manga
- Written by: Kamio Fukuchi
- Published by: Kodansha
- Imprint: Shōnen Magazine Comics
- Magazine: Weekly Shōnen Magazine
- Original run: November 16, 2022 – present
- Volumes: 19
- Anime television series
- Directed by: Hiroshi Ishiodori
- Written by: Yoshifumi Fukushima
- Music by: Akifumi Tada; Rina Tayama
- Studio: Brain's Base
- Licensed by: Sentai Filmworks: SEA: Medialink
- Original network: AT-X (uncensored); Tokyo MX, BS11, ABC TV (censored)
- Original run: April 11, 2026 – June 27, 2026
- Episodes: 12
- icon

Yowayowa Sensei (よわよわ先生; lit. 'Weak-willed Teacher') is a Japanese manga series written and illustrated by Kamio Fukuchi. It began serialization in Kodansha's Weekly Shōnen Magazine in November 2022 and has been compiled into nineteen tankōbon volumes as of September 2026. An anime television series adaptation produced by Brain's Base aired from April to June 2026.

== Plot ==
The series follows Akihito Abikura, a second-year high school student. His new homeroom teacher is Hiyori Hiwamura, an English teacher who recently graduated from university. Due to her shy personality, she does not make a good impression. Her use of a notebook full of sticky notes leads to rumors about her putting curses on the students, leading them to misunderstand her and refer to her as "Scary Teacher." Akihito realizes she is not scary at all, just misunderstood. After seeing her teach in an empty classroom with only a stuffed animal, he offers to help her overcome her shyness.

== Characters ==
Akihito Abikura (阿比倉 章人, Abikura Akihito)
Voiced by: Kakeru Hatano (anime) (Japanese); Bryson Baugus (English)
A second-year high school student under Hiyori. He decides to help Hiyori with her shyness after seeing her teaching a mock class and realizing that she is not actually scary, merely misunderstood. He offers to become class representative as part of helping her out. He often finds himself in lewd situations with Hiyori.
Hiyori Hiwamura (鶸村 ひより, Hiwamura Hiyori)
Voiced by: Marika Kōno (PV, anime) (Japanese); Karlii Hoch (English)
An English teacher who just started her career after graduating from university. She becomes Akihito's homeroom teacher. Due to her extremely shy personality, students gain a negative perception of her, leading her to be nicknamed "Scary Teacher." She later moves next to Akihito's apartment to be closer to school. In order to gain confidence, she sometimes puts plush toys in a classroom and practices teaching with them. She later becomes the advisor of the photography club.
Mizuki Mukubayashi (椋林 瑞希, Mukubayashi Mizuki)
Voiced by: Yurie Igoma (Japanese); Juliet Simmons (English)
Akihito's classmate who is a gyaru. Although the two went to the same elementary school, they are initially not close. However, she actually has had feelings for Akihito all this time. She later becomes co-class representative along with Akihito.
Akemi Abikura (阿比倉 朱美, Abikura Akemi)
Voiced by: Mai Nakahara (Japanese); Ellen Elise Evans (English)
Akihito's older sister who works as a nurse. She is very protective of Akihito.
Yuki Yukishita (雪下 祐樹, Yukishita Yūki)
Voiced by: Yū Sasahara (Japanese); Brittney Karbowski (English)
Akihito's classmate. She has a tomboyish personality and uses the masculine pronoun ore.
Kaya Kuguri (九栗 香夜, Kuguri Kaya)
Voiced by: Yūko Natsuyoshi (Japanese); Katelyn Barr (English)
A third-year student with an interest in photography. She is very attached to Hiyori.

== Media ==
=== Manga ===
Written and illustrated by Kamio Fukuchi, Yowayowa Sensei began serialization in Kodansha's Weekly Shōnen Magazine on November 16, 2022. The series has been compiled into nineteen tankōbon volumes as of September 2026. To promote the release of the seventh volume, a promotional video was released on YouTube featuring Marika Kōno as the voice of Hiyori. A collaboration with cosplayer Enako featuring her cosplaying the character Mizuki was released in June 2024.

No.	Release date	ISBN
1	March 16, 2023	978-4-06-530996-4
2	May 17, 2023	978-4-06-531600-9
3	August 17, 2023	978-4-06-532609-1
4	October 17, 2023	978-4-06-533158-3
5	December 15, 2023	978-4-06-533890-2
6	February 16, 2024	978-4-06-534563-4
7	May 16, 2024	978-4-06-535510-7
8	July 17, 2024	978-4-06-536138-2
9	October 17, 2024	978-4-06-537129-9
10	December 17, 2024	978-4-06-537770-3
11	February 17, 2025	978-4-06-538417-6
12	May 16, 2025	978-4-06-539354-3
13	July 16, 2025	978-4-06-540085-2
14	September 17, 2025	978-4-06-540698-4
15	November 17, 2025	978-4-06-541556-6
16	February 17, 2026	978-4-06-542627-2
17	April 16, 2026	978-4-06-543320-1
18	June 17, 2026	978-4-06-543906-7
19	September 16, 2026	978-4-06-544974-5

=== Anime ===
An anime television series adaptation was announced on December 4, 2024. It was produced by Brain's Base and directed by Hiroshi Ishiodori, with series composition handled by Yoshifumi Fukushima, characters designed by Naoki Aisaka, and music composed by Akifumi Tada and Rina Tayama. The series aired from April 11 to June 27, 2026, on AT-X and other channels. The opening theme song is "COMIT COMET" performed by Daoko, while the ending theme song is "Yowayowa Tsuyotsuyo Minimini Kowakowa" (わよわ つよつよ みにみに こわこわ) performed by Marika Kōno, Yurie Igoma and Yū Sasahara as their respective characters.

Sentai Filmworks licensed the series in North America for streaming on Hidive. Medialink licensed the series for streaming on Ani-One Asia's YouTube channel. Hidive announced the series would receive an English dub, which premiered on June 24, 2026.

==== Episodes ====
No.	Title	Directed by (Note: Production staff information is taken from the ending credits of each episode.)	Written by	Storyboard by	Original release date
Lesson–1	"Spooky Scary Sensei"; Transliteration: "Kowakowa Sensei" (Japanese: こわこわ先生)	Hiroshi Ishiodori	Yoshifumi Fukushima	Hiroshi Ishiodori	April 11, 2026
Lesson–2	"Weak and Wimpy After School"; Transliteration: "Yowayowa no Hōkago" (Japanese: よわよわの放課後)	Hiroshi Ishiodori	Yoshifumi Fukushima	Hiroshi Ishiodori	April 18, 2026
Lesson–3	"Communicating By Touch"; Transliteration: "Momimomi no Komyunikēshon" (Japanese: もみもみの コミュニケーション)	Hiroshi Ishiodori	Yoshifumi Fukushima	Hiroshi Ishiodori	April 25, 2026
Lesson–4	"A Weak and Wimpy School Camp"; Transliteration: "Yowayowa no Rinkan Gakkō" (Japanese: よわよわの林間学校)	Takafumi Fujii	Yoshifumi Fukushima	Hiroshi Ishiodori	May 2, 2026
Lesson–5	"A Weak and Wimpy Date"; Transliteration: "Yowayowa no Odēto" (Japanese: よわよわのおデート)	Hiroshi Ishiodori	Yoshifumi Fukushima	Masaharu Okuwaki	May 9, 2026
Lesson–6	"Weak and Wimpy Blackmail"; Transliteration: "Yowayowa no Kyōhaku" (Japanese: よわよわの脅迫)	Takafumi Fujii	Yoshifumi Fukushima	Hiroshi Ishiodori	May 16, 2026
Lesson–7	"A Weak and Wimpy Photography Training Camp (1)"; Transliteration: "Yowayowa no Satsuei Gasshuku ①" (Japanese: よわよわの撮影合宿①)	Hiroshi Ishiodori	Shōko Masumoto	Masaharu Okuwaki	May 23, 2026
Lesson–8	"A Weak and Wimpy Photography Training Camp (2)"; Transliteration: "Yowayowa no Satsuei Gasshuku ②" (Japanese: よわよわの撮影合宿②)	Takafumi Fujii	Yoshifumi Fukushima	Minoru Ohara	May 30, 2026
Lesson–9	"A Weak and Wimpy Fireworks Display"; Transliteration: "Yowayowa no Hanabi Taikai" (Japanese: よわよわの花火大会)	Seiya Ishida	Yoshifumi Fukushima	Minoru Ohara	June 6, 2026
Lesson–10	"A Weak and Wimpy 'Best Summer Ever'"; Transliteration: "Yowayowa no 'Saikō no Natsu'" (Japanese: よわよわの『最高の夏』)	Takafumi Fujii	Yoshifumi Fukushima	Minoru Ohara	June 13, 2026
Lesson–11	"Strong and Sturdy Feelings"; Transliteration: "Tsuyotsuyo no Kimochi" (Japanese: つよつよのきもち)	Yoshinobu Kasai	Yoshifumi Fukushima	Hiroshi Ishiodori	June 20, 2026
Lesson–12	"A Weak and Wimpy Jump Rope Tournament"; Transliteration: "Yowayowa no Ōnawa Taikai" (Japanese: よわよわの大縄大会)	Hiroshi Ishiodori	Yoshifumi Fukushima	Hiroshi Ishiodori	June 27, 2026
