= Summoned to Another World... Again? =

Japanese light novel series and its franchise

- Summoned to Another World... Again?!
- First light novel volume cover

異世界召喚は二度目です (Isekai Shōkan wa Nidome Desu)
- Genre: Action
- Novel series
- Written by: Kazuha Kishimoto
- Published by: Shōsetsuka ni Narō
- Original run: March 2015 – December 2016
- Light novel
- Written by: Kazuha Kishimoto
- Illustrated by: 40hara
- Published by: Futabasha
- Imprint: Monster Bunko
- Original run: October 30, 2015 – July 29, 2017
- Volumes: 5
- Manga
- Written by: Kazuha Kishimoto
- Illustrated by: Arashiyama
- Published by: Futabasha
- English publisher: NA: Coolmic
- Imprint: Monster Comics
- Magazine: Web Comic Action
- Original run: June 2018 – present
- Volumes: 15
- Anime television series

Summoned to Another World for a Second Time
- Directed by: Motoki Nakanishi
- Produced by: Tomoyuki Oowada; Koutarou Horiguchi; Tomonori Yusa; Masaki Ishii; Atsushi Nagashima; Yuusuke Oonoki
- Written by: Yukihito
- Music by: Manzo
- Studio: Studio Elle
- Licensed by: Crunchyroll
- Original network: ANN (ABC TV, TV Asahi), BS11, AT-X
- Original run: April 9, 2023 – June 25, 2023
- Episodes: 12
- icon

Summoned to Another World... Again?! (異世界召喚は二度目です, Isekai Shōkan wa Nidome Desu; "Summoned to Another World for a Second Time") is a Japanese light novel series written by Kazuha Kishimoto and illustrated by 40hara. It was serialized online between March 2015 and December 2016 on the user-generated novel publishing website Shōsetsuka ni Narō, followed by nine epilogue chapters between February 2017 and October 2020. It was later acquired by Futabasha, who have published five volumes from October 2015 to July 2017 under their Monster Bunko imprint. A manga adaptation with art by Arashiyama has been serialized via Futabasha's digital publication Web Comic Action since June 2018. It has been collected in fifteen tankōbon volumes. An anime television series adaptation by Studio Elle aired from April to June 2023.

== Plot ==
A group of high school students are abruptly magically transported into the world of Eclair to the Kingdom of Distinia, which is being invaded by an army of demons. The king explains to the bewildered students that they have been summoned to become Heroes to defend the kingdom, and that this is the second time such emergency measures have been taken; five (of their) years ago, another "Hero" had been summoned, had ended the war and brought peace before he mysteriously vanished.

What nobody realizes is that one of the summoned students, Setsu, is that very same Hero. The problem is, because his appearance is different, nobody in this world recognizes him at first, so he has to reunite with his former comrades to save this world for a second time as well as uncover the mastermind behind this new war.

== Characters ==
Setsu (セツ)
Voiced by: Shun'ichi Toki
A somewhat saturnine high school student who had been transported to Eclair and had helped defeat the Demon Army five Eclairian years ago, but had been magically transported to Earth and reincarnated as "Yuki", even though he retained all of his memories of his time in Eclair. Now back for a second time, he retains all of his fighting skills.
Elka (エルカ, Eruka)
Voiced by: Kaori Maeda
A soldier in the Distinia Army who knew (and adored) Setsu previously. A skilled fighter, she still has a bit of a masochistic streak (where Setsu is concerned).
Yūhi (夕陽)
Voiced by: Satomi Amano
Setsu's high school classmate who is transported to Eclair with the rest of her class. She is quite innocent, has a major crush on "Yuki" and develops magical powers after her arrival in Eclair.
Thea
Voiced by: Aoi Yuki
A magical researcher in Distinia and Setsu's friend from his previous time.
Livaia (リヴァイア, Rivaia)
Voiced by: Fairouz Ai
Also known as Leviathan, the god of the Ocean. Another old friend of Setsu's. In human form, she has purple hair and gill-like ears; in her actual form, she is a kaiju-sized sea serpent. She maintains the peace of the ocean.
Dezastol (デザストル, Dezasutoru)
Voiced by: Saori Ōnishi
Her full name is Dezastol Serreno, with the nickname "Dezas", and she is the Demon Lord. She resides on the Demonic Continent at the castle Evilbarrow.
Tōma (冬真)
Voiced by: Takuma Nagatsuka
Another Earth person previously transported to Eclair along with Setsu, but who has turned to evil after being neglected by the king and the citizens of Distinia. He is the traitor behind the Demon Army five years ago who is now also behind the current war; his ultimate goal is to become a god and destroy all other lifeforms.
Shironeko (シロネコ)
Voiced by: Yui Ogura
A young Beastgirl who has been taking missions in order to buy a particularly expensive medicine for her older sister Mineko. After Setsu removes Mineko's "illness" (actually a curse), she and her sister join him on his mission to stop Toma.
Mineko (ミネコ)
Voiced by: Rina Honnizumi
Shironeko's older sister, who has been ill for a long time due to the effects of dark magic from a cursed necklace. After Setsu cures Mineko's "illness", she and her sister join him on his mission to stop Toma.
Loa (ロア, Roa)
Voiced by: Satomi Akesaka
The daughter of the Beast King and another student of Setsu's from the past.
Ruri (ルリ)
Voiced by: Yurie Kozakai
The granddaughter and apprentice of a famous Distinia jeweler. After his death, she undertakes to deliver his last commission, a brooch with a repaired magic stone, to the demon queen Dezastol on the Demonic Continent, with Setsu becoming her protector along the way.
Alize (アリゼ, Arize)
Voiced by: Miku Itō
A former student of Setsu's; despite her being a skilled warrior, because of her sentimentality he used to refer to her as "Crybaby".
Brad (ブラッド, Buraddo)
Voiced by: Kenji Akabane
The subordinate of the demon queen Dezastol.
King Distinia (ディスティニア国王, Disutinia Kokuō)
Voiced by: Hozumi Gōda
Princess (王女, Ōjo)
Voiced by: Marie Hashimoto

== Media ==
=== Light novel ===
The series written by Kazuha Kishimoto was serialized online from March 2015 to December 2016 on the user-generated novel publishing website Shōsetsuka ni Narō. It was later acquired by Futabasha, who published the series as a light novel under their Monster Bunko imprint with illustrations by 40hara in five volumes from October 30, 2015, to July 29, 2017.

No.	Release date	ISBN
1	October 30, 2015	978-4-575-75060-7
2	March 30, 2016	978-4-575-75081-2
3	August 30, 2016	978-4-575-75102-4
4	January 30, 2017	978-4-575-75121-5
5	July 29, 2017	978-4-575-75149-9

=== Manga ===
A manga adaptation with art by Arashiyama has been serialized via Futabasha's digital publication Web Comic Action since June 2018. It has been collected in fifteen (including three released digital-only) tankōbon volumes as of December 2025. Coolmic is publishing the manga in English.

No.	Release date	ISBN
1	November 30, 2018	978-4-575-41040-2
2	May 30, 2019	978-4-575-41058-7
3	December 28, 2019	978-4-575-41093-8
4	June 30, 2020	978-4-575-41129-4
5	December 28, 2020	978-4-575-41200-0
6	June 30, 2021	978-4-575-41262-8
7	December 28, 2021	978-4-575-41347-2
8	August 12, 2022	978-4-575-41446-2
9	March 30, 2023	978-4-575-41615-2
10	June 30, 2023	978-4-575-41680-0
11	December 28, 2023	978-4-575-41795-1
12	June 28, 2024	978-4-575-41918-4
13	December 27, 2024 (ebook)	—
14	June 28, 2025 (ebook)	—
15	December 26, 2025 (ebook)	—
16	July 29, 2025 (ebook)	—

=== Anime ===
On October 26, 2021, an anime television series adaptation was announced. It will be produced by Studio Elle and directed by Motoki Nakanishi, with scripts written by Yukihito, character designs handled by Mikako Kunii, and music composed by Manzo. The series aired from April 9 to June 25, 2023, on ABC and TV Asahi's Animazing!!! programming block. The opening theme song is "Continue Distortion" by S.S.NiRVERGE∀, while the ending theme song is "Be ambitious!!!" by Maybe Me. Crunchyroll streamed the series under the title Summoned to Another World for a Second Time.

==== Episodes ====
No.	Title	Directed by	Written by	Storyboarded by	Original release date
1	"Summoned to Another World for a Second Time"; Transliteration: "Isekai Shōkan wa Nidome desu" (Japanese: 異世界召喚は二度目です)	Motoki Nakanishi	Yukihito	Motoki Nakanishi	April 9, 2023
Setsu, his childhood friend Yuhi, and their high school classmates are summoned to another world as heroes of Distinia Kingdom, at war with the demons after five years of peace. This does not surprise Setsu as he was summoned to Distinia before as the previous hero who successfully ended the last war before being abruptly returned to Japan to restart his life as a baby. While his classmates train as beginners Setsu has regained his old powers and reveals his identity to his former teammate, now a knight, Elka by spanking her, revealing her secret masochistic attraction to him. He also meets former teammates Glein and Thea who reveal Setsu had disappeared in an explosion while duelling a man named Toma, ending the war. Setsu suspects Toma has restarted the war by manipulating the demons with curse magic. Setsu decides not to reveal his identity publicly and will prevent the war by going out on his own to find Toma, leaving his teammates to train his classmates. After stealing his old sword Kuromaru from Distinia's armoury Yuhi asks to accompany him but he tells her to stay and train for when he returns.
2	"Going on a Trip for a Second Time"; Transliteration: "Tabi ni Deru no wa Nidome desu" (Japanese: 旅に出るのは二度目です)	Yoshihiro Mori	Yukihito	Seiji Okuda	April 16, 2023
Setsu rescues a young girl named Ruri from a monster attack. As she is making an important delivery of the last piece of jewellery her grandfather repaired before his death Setsu agrees to escort her to the next town. There, Ruri tries to hire a ship to the Demon Continent, but all travel there is cancelled due to the war. Bullying royal knights harass Ruri to steal her valuables but Setsu humiliates them in front of witnesses. At an inn Setsu peeks at the jewellery while Ruri bathes and discovers it is a necklace from his previous life he enchanted with protection magic as a gift for a close friend. This worries him, if Ruri's grandfather was asked to repair it, it could only have broken if his friend was in a serious fight and may not have survived. The knights frame them as demon sympathizers and try to arrest them, but they escape when Setsu summons his old friend Leviathon, water dragon and Goddess of the Ocean, leaving the knights bewildered and terrified. Leviathon agrees to carry them across the sea to the Demon Continent.
3	"Frying a Squid for a Second Time"; Transliteration: "Ika wo Ageru no wa Nidome desu" (Japanese: イカを揚げるのは二度目です)	Masahiko Watanabe	Yukihito	Takano Kon	April 23, 2023
Arriving at the continent Leviathon kills a Kraken then transforms into a young woman nicknamed Levaia to scold Setsu for not helping. Setsu makes deep fried squid as an apology. Ruri reveals her customer is actually Dezastol "Dezas" Serreno, the current demon lord and old friend of Setsu and Levaia. Not wanting to waste food they take the Kraken to Volsee village who celebrate as the Kraken had ruined their fishing trade. During the party Ruri realises Levaia has a crush on Setsu but is angry he vanished for five years. Vlad, Dezas' bodyguard, sees the party and upon seeing Setsu has returned begs him to save Dezas. Dezas has been cursed and forced to marry Terran Sneeter, the wealthiest human merchant in the world who claims he can arrange peace since humans attacked the demon continent first. Setsu is surprised since humans believe the demons attacked first. Setsu suspects there is a conspiracy to restart the war which probably includes Terran using his merchants network to spread false information. To rescue Dezas and interrogate Terran, Setsu and Levaia set off to Evilbarrow, Dezas' castle, to stop the wedding.
4	"Receiving a Gift for a Second Time"; Transliteration: "Okurimono wa Nidome desu" (Japanese: 贈り物は二度目です)	Hiromichi Matano	Yukihito	Kazuhiro Soetaka	April 30, 2023
Dezas, who is deeply in love with Setsu, had worked hard to maintain the peace he won before disappearing. One day her necklace mysteriously broke so she sent it to be repaired but never got it back due to the new war breaking out. Terran eventually offered peace in exchange for their marriage so Dezas agreed to marry him and wear a new necklace cursed to ensure her slave-like obedience. Terran reports to the conspirators he will soon own the Demon Continent, though they seem uninterested in whether the war ends or not. Setsu interrupts the wedding in the nick of time to prevent Terran putting the cursed necklace on Dezas, who is overjoyed at Setsu's return. Terran's bodyguard escapes to report back to the conspirators. Setsu confirms the cursed necklace was made by Toma and destroys it before returning Dezas' repaired necklace to her, renewing their promise of peace. Next, Setsu decides to visit his other friend Regulus, King of the Beastmen. Terran is arrested and Dezas asks Setsu for a date after the war. Ruri is allowed to open a shop in Dezas' kingdom. Setsu and Levaia depart to find Regulus.
5	"Following Footsteps for a Second Time"; Transliteration: "Oikakeru no wa Nidome desu" (Japanese: 追いかけるのは二度目です)	Shū Honma	Yukihito	Ryoden B	May 7, 2023
Flashbacks show Yuhi wanted to attend the same highschool as Setsu, even attending extra classes but couldn't get the grades and was heartbroken, until Setsu helped her study. Now in Distinia Yuhi finds she has a talent for magic and asks Elka and Glein for additional training to become Setsu's teammate faster. Elka is convinced by her skills but not her resolve. She pits Yuhi against a low level monster which she defeats but hesitates to kill it. Disappointed, Elka kills it and Yuhi realises in a real fight she would only be a liability for Setsu. Thea heals her injuries and reveals Elka was only hard on her because she also wants Elka strong enough to become Setsu's teammate. Yuhi asks Glein how he found his resolve. Glein enjoys hurting his enemies but advises Yuhi to find her own type of resolve. Yuhi defeats another monster but refuses to kill it, having found her resolve to be strong enough to support Setsu without needing to kill. Elka accepts her resolve as it is the same type Setsu once had. The King abruptly decrees Yuhi and her classmates will leave for a mission to the demon continent immediately.
6	"Master and Pupil for a Second Time"; Transliteration: "Shitei Kankei wa Nidome desu" (Japanese: 師弟関係は二度目です)	Masahiko Watanabe	Motoki Nakanishi	Takaaki Ishiyama	May 14, 2023
Setsu and Levaia encounter Alizee, another of Setsu's students, and her friend Amelle. Following Setsu's disappearance Alizee worked as a monster slayer and was recently hired by Zathrow village to slay a dragon. Villager Amelle was worried her brother had disappeared when the dragon appeared. Alizee noticed the dragons victims always just vanished, with no signs of a dragon attack. After injuring the dragon and driving it away Alizee found all the villagers had gone missing, except Amelle. She is now taking Amelle to a city to find someone to look after her. Setsu suspects the villagers were kidnapped by powerful teleportation magic, which by coincidence lured in the dragon, making it seem the dragon was behind the disappearances. From clues in their conversation Setsu identifies Amelle as the culprit. Amelle reveals she is a powerful dragon in human form so Setsu and Alizee slay her. Setsu and Levaia set off to the Beastman continent while Alizee stays hoping to find the missing villagers. Returning to Zathrow Alizee finds Amelle is alive. Her real name is Melluar, the Master of Monsters, and she has been kidnapping people to turn them into powerful doll soldiers for Toma's army.
7	"Visiting the Beastmen Contient for a Second Time"; Transliteration: "Jūjin Tairiku wa Nidome desu" (Japanese: 獣人大陸は二度目です)	Yoshihiro Mori	Yukihito	Takano Kon	May 21, 2023
On the Beastman continent monster-slayer Shironeko cares for her sick sister Mineko but struggles as her medicine is expensive. After swimming for three days with Setsu on her back Levaea reaches the Beastman continent but demands a rest before going further. In the same town Shironeko's boss Kuroinu offers her enough money to care for Mineko indefinitely if she assassinates a troublesome man; Setsu. She attacks Setsu but is easily defeated. Setsu finds she smells of curse magic so he returns her to her home but conceals her assassination attempt from Minoke, for which Shironeko is grateful. Setsu reveals Mineko isn't sick, she is unknowingly wearing another of Toma's cursed necklaces. Setsu removes the curse with his secret weapon Glutton, a sword that devours magic. Kuroinu, another of Toma's agents, tries to kill Setsu but she is defeated by Levaea. Kuroinu reveals Toma's goal is to become God and wipe out all living beings, then she teleports away. Free of the curse Mineko and Shironeko insist on helping Setsu reach Regdom, the Beastman capital city, while also hoping to find and rescue Kuroinu.
8	"Fighting a Duel for a Second Time"; Transliteration: "Kettō suru no wa Nidome desu" (Japanese: 決闘するのは二度目です)	Naoyoshi Kusaka	Yukihito	Hiroyuki Shimazu	May 28, 2023
In the past Setsu tutored Roa, the Beastmen's princess. Now Setsu returns to Regdom and finds Roa is eager to become his student. King Regulus is also glad to see him. Learning Toma is behind the war Regulas and Roa are eager to help. General Rouga insists Setsu's 5 year absence means he can no longer be trusted. He also claims to be Roa's fiancé and is jealous over Setsu. Regulus announces Setsu will duel Rouga to prove his trustworthiness, plus the winner will marry Roa. Rouga reveals a tattoo he received from a sorcerer that converts willpower into strength. Even transformed into his beast form and with the tattoo Setsu still defeats Rouga. Rouga's tattoo takes his jealousy and mutates him, but his body starts to tear apart from the power. Abruptly, Rouga dies horribly as Toma's astral form manifests from his blood, confirming the tattoo was one of his curses. He is thrilled to see Setsu, revealing his grand plan is to kill everything for Setsu so they could fall in love and live together as Gods. He vanishes, leaving Rouga's body behind. Setsu, his party and Roa return to the demon continent to find Toma while Regulus organises his army to follow as soon as possible.
9	"Summoned to Another World for the First Time"; Transliteration: "Isekai Shōkan wa Ichidome desu" (Japanese: 異世界召喚は一度目です)	Yūki Morita	Yukihito	Takaaki Ishiyama	June 4, 2023
Ten years ago Setsu was summoned as Distinia's hero along with Toma. Setsu was furious at being summoned away from his own life just to solve Distinia's problems. Setsu trained to ensure his own survival and entered a pact with Toma to end the war. Setsu decided to explore the world with Elka, Glein and Thea while Toma stayed in Distinia studying magic. One day Toma encountered a cursed necklace that offered him the power to return to Japan with Setsu, so he took it and immediately afterward learned Setsu had made friends with the leaders of every nation and negotiated peace. With the war over he told Setsu he could return them to Japan but Setsu chose to stay. With the curse driving him insane at Setsu's rejection Toma attacked, resulting in the explosion that sent Setsu back to Japan as a baby. Toma was thrown far away by the explosion but the curse directed him to a temple where scientists performed torturous human experiments. After destroying it he rescued four surviving test subjects; Kuroinu, Melluar and two men. Now Setsu has returned Toma plans to form a pantheon of Gods from himself, the four test subjects and Setsu.
10	"Arriving at A Battlefield for a Second Time"; Transliteration: "Futatabime no Senjō e no Tōchaku" (Japanese: 二度目の戦場への到着)	Hiromichi Matano	Kumoi Suna	Hiromichi Matano, Takaaki Ishiyama	June 11, 2023
Distinia's army arrives at the Demon continent with Setsu's classmates. Elka knows they are unable to stop the fighting without Setsu so Yuhi decides to prevent as many deaths as possible. Many are killed in the first battle, traumatising many classmates and Yuhi has to stop one killing an injured soldier who can no longer fight back. A hypnotised Alizee attacks with Toma's doll soldiers and Melluar's summoned monsters, killing both demons and humans to sow chaos. Melluar hopes to similarly hypnotise Setsu's former teammates, but they destroy her monsters and Elka stabs Melluar in her magic core, destroying her magic power. Melluar doesn't die, revealing as a test subject she was forcibly given extra internal organs to survive fatal injuries, and an extra magic core. Using all her remaining power she summons a giant chimera and fuses herself to it. Alizee, who still loves Melluar like a sister, breaks her hypnosis and stabs Melluar. With no power left Melluar dies in Alizee's arms. A male test subject attacks in retaliation for her death. With everyone else exhausted Yuhi bravely decides to fight him alone but Setsu arrives just in time.
11	"Going All In for a Second Time"; Transliteration: "Futatabime no Zenryoku Tōkyū" (Japanese: 二度目の全力投球)	Kōichirō Kuroda, Masayuki Egami	Yukihito	Kōichi Ōhata	June 18, 2023
Regulus' army finally sets off to follow Setsu. Yuhi is so happy to see Setsu she nearly kisses him. Setsu is annoyed Elka has been teaching Yuhi masochistic nonsense. The test subject Kagerou is the one who escaped Setsu's attack at Dezas' castle and is happy to duel Setsu again. Mineko and Shironeko locate and duel Kuroinu, revealing their ability Beast Merge, that fuses them into one body faster and stronger than Kuroinu, who is defeated. Kuroinu reveals she sided with Toma because the scientist's experiments killed all her siblings. The final test subject, Virdos, possesses synthetic iron muscles making him immune to injury. Roa fights him but he reveals his secondary power lets him disintegrate into iron dust then reform into any shape. Roa is injured by iron cannonballs but activates her beast form. She manages to crack Virdos' armour, despite being impaled by spears, and crushes his heart. Amused by his defeat, Virdos heals Roa's injuries before he collapses. Setsu destroys Kagerou's damage absorbing armour, and though he doesn't want to, kills him when Kagerou refuses to stop fighting. Toma, sensing all subjects are defeated or dead, appears nearby to finally finish his grand plan.
12	"Fighting the Last Battle for a Second Time"; Transliteration: "Rasuto Batoru wa Nidome desu" (Japanese: ラストバトルは二度目です)	Keisuke Ōnishi, Motoki Nakanishi	Yukihito	Kōichi Ōhata, Shinpei Nagai	June 25, 2023
Toma invades Evilbarrow to attack Levaia and Dezas but Setsu quickly arrives. Possessing similar abilities their rematch is so fierce it destroys the throne room, splits the sky and destroys mountains. Toma furiously realises with the Subjects dead he is once again entirely alone while Setsu still has his friends. Going berserk he unleashes his power, but Setsu realises it is not Toma's power at all. Toma is overwhelmed and wounded but destroys Setsu's sword. As Toma gloats in victory Setsu traps him in a dimensional barrier and, unleashing his Glutton sword, devours his magic until nothing is left. Toma despairs at dying completely alone until he suddenly awakens. Setsu reveals all Glutton ate was the cursed necklace that tempted Toma into insanity in the first place. Toma is imprisoned and at Setsu's suggestion is sentenced to spend all his remaining magic sending himself and Setsu's classmates back to Japan to restart their lives as normal humans. Toma agrees but opts to stay behind as a human without magic and to travel the world free of insanity to find ways of making it better. Setsu decides to finally see the world as a tourist with Yuhi, visiting all their friends and seeing every country as they recover from the war.

== See also ==
- Isshō Hatarakitakunai Ore ga, Classmate no Daininki Idol ni Natsukaretara, another light novel series by the same author
