= I'm Giving the Disgraced Noble Lady I Rescued a Crash Course in Naughtiness =

Japanese light novel series and its franchise

- I'm Giving the Disgraced Noble Lady I Rescued a Crash Course in Naughtiness: I'll Spoil Her with Delicacies and Style to Make Her the Happiest Woman in the World!
- First light novel volume cover

婚約破棄された令嬢を拾った俺が、イケナイことを教え込む～美味しいものを食べさせておしゃれをさせて、世界一幸せな少女にプロデュース！～ (Konyaku Haki Sareta Reijō o Hirotta Ore ga, Ikenai Koto o Oshiekomu: Oishii Mono o Tabesasete Oshare o Sasete, Sekai Ichi Shiawase na Shōjo ni Purodyūsu!)
- Genre: Fantasy, slice of life
- Novel series
- Written by: Sametarō Fukada
- Published by: Shōsetsuka ni Narō
- Original run: August 12, 2019 – present
- Light novel
- Written by: Sametarō Fukada
- Illustrated by: Sakura Miwabe
- Published by: Shufu to Seikatsu Sha
- English publisher: NA: J-Novel Club
- Imprint: Pash! Books
- Original run: March 27, 2020 – present
- Volumes: 4
- Manga
- Written by: Sametarō Fukada
- Illustrated by: Ichiho Katsura
- Published by: Shufu to Seikatsu Sha
- English publisher: NA: Kodansha USA
- Magazine: Pash Up!
- Original run: March 26, 2020 – August 6, 2026
- Volumes: 11
- Anime television series
- Directed by: Takashi Asami
- Produced by: Natsuko Kawasaki; Hiromi Matsuda; Makoto Nishibe; Fumihiro Ozawa; Yang Jianli; Kana Kuroda
- Written by: Hiroki Uchida
- Music by: Masato Kōda
- Studio: Zero-G; Digital Network Animation
- Licensed by: Crunchyroll
- Original network: Tokyo MX, BS Fuji, AT-X
- Original run: October 4, 2023 – December 20, 2023
- Episodes: 12
- icon

I'm Giving the Disgraced Noble Lady I Rescued a Crash Course in Naughtiness: I'll Spoil Her with Delicacies and Style to Make Her the Happiest Woman in the World! (Note: Japanese: 婚約破棄された令嬢を拾った俺が、イケナイことを教え込む～美味しいものを食べさせておしゃれをさせて、世界一幸せな少女にプロデュース！～, Hepburn: Konyaku Haki Sareta Reijō o Hirotta Ore ga, Ikenai Koto o Oshiekomu: Oishii Mono o Tabesasete Oshare o Sasete, Sekai Ichi Shiawase na Shōjo ni Purodyūsu!; lit. 'I Picked Up a Rich Girl Whose Betrothal Was Canceled and Teach Her to Be Naughty: I'll Make Her Eat Delicious Food, Wear Fancy Clothes, and Be the Happiest Girl in the World!') is a Japanese light novel series written by Sametarō Fukada and illustrated by Sakura Miwabe. It began as a web novel that started in the Shōsetsuka ni Narō website in August 2019. It was later acquired by Shufu to Seikatsu Sha, who have published four volumes and one short story collection since March 2020 under their Pash! Books imprint.

A manga adaptation illustrated by Ichiho Katsura was serialized in the Pash Up! website from March 2020 to August 2026, with its chapters collected into eleven tankōbon volumes as of April 2026. An anime television series adaptation produced by Zero-G and Digital Network Animation aired from October to December 2023.

== Plot ==
After being betrayed by her fiancé and abused by her family, a young noblewoman named Charlotte Evans is forced to flee her home. Along the way, a misanthropic wizard named Allen Crawford, who is known as the Dark Lord due to his personality, comes across her. Once he hears her story following their arrival at his mansion, Allen decides that he is going to indulge Charlotte in naughtiness by pampering her to her heart's content.

== Characters ==
Allen Crawford (アレン・クロフォード, Aren Kurofōdo)
Voiced by: Tomokazu Sugita
A great and powerful mage. He takes Charlotte in after she was abused by her family and kicked out.
Charlotte Evans (シャーロット・エヴァンズ, Shārotto Evanzu)
Voiced by: Saori Hayami
The titular noble lady. She was framed for a litany of fake crimes and kicked out of her family. Charlotte was incapable of selfishness or even rudeness until Allen teaches her assertiveness.
Erūca Crawford (エルーカ・クロフォード, Erūka Kurofōdo)
Voiced by: Lynn
Allen's sister. She is an incredibly powerful mage, being only outclassed by Allen.
Miacha Bastetos (ミアハ・バステトス, Miaha Basutetosu)
Voiced by: Naomi Ōzora
Lü (ルゥ, Rū)
Voiced by: Atsumi Tanezaki
Gosetsu (ゴウセツ, Gōsetsu)
Voiced by: Ryōtarō Okiayu
Natalia Evans (ナタリア・エヴァンズ, Nataria Evanzu)
Voiced by: Kaori Maeda
Dorothea Gri'mm Wallenstein (ドロテア・グリ=ム・ヴァレンシュタイン, Dorotea Gurīmu Varenshutain)
Voiced by: Rika Nagae
Yor (ヨル, Yoru)
Voiced by: Shin'ichirō Kamio
Harvey Crawford (ハーヴェイ・クロフォード, Hāvei Kurofōdo)
Voiced by: Hikaru Midorikawa
Liselotte Crawford (リーゼロッテ・クロフォード, Rīzerotte Kurofōdo)
Voiced by: Akari Kitō
Cecil (セシル, Seshiru)
Voiced by: Makoto Furukawa

== Media ==
=== Light novel ===
Written by Sametarō Fukada, the series began as a web novel that started in the Shōsetsuka ni Narō website on August 12, 2019. It was later acquired by Shufu to Seikatsu Sha, who began publishing the novels with illustrations by Sakura Miwabe on March 27, 2020. As of January 2025, four volumes and one short story collection have been released.

In May 2023, J-Novel Club announced that it had licensed the light novel for English publication.

No.	Original release date	Original ISBN	English release date	English ISBN
1	March 27, 2020	978-4-391-15444-3	August 16, 2023	978-1-718-37638-0
2	October 30, 2020	978-4-391-15529-7	November 14, 2023	978-1-718-37640-3
3	July 2, 2021	978-4-391-15630-0	February 14, 2024	978-1-718-37642-7
SS	August 4, 2023	978-4-391-16050-5	—	—
4	January 10, 2025	978-4-391-16401-5	—	—

=== Manga ===
A manga adaptation illustrated by Ichiho Katsura was serialized on Shufu to Seikatsu Sha's Pash Up! website from March 26, 2020, to August 6, 2026. The first tankōbon volume was released on October 30, 2020. As of April 2026, eleven volumes have been released.

During their panel at Anime NYC 2022, Kodansha USA announced that they licensed the manga adaptation for a Fall 2023 release.

No.	Original release date	Original ISBN	English release date	English ISBN
1	October 30, 2020	978-4-391-15530-3	September 26, 2023	978-1-647-29279-9
2	December 25, 2020	978-4-391-15528-0	November 21, 2023	978-1-647-29280-5
3	July 2, 2021	978-4-391-15631-7	January 23, 2024	978-1-647-29281-2
4	February 4, 2022	978-4-391-15732-1	March 5, 2024	978-1-647-29282-9
5	September 2, 2022	978-4-391-15817-5	May 7, 2024	978-1-647-29332-1
6	April 7, 2023	978-4-391-15956-1	July 16, 2024	978-1-647-29353-6
7	September 1, 2023	978-4-391-15957-8	September 3, 2024	978-1-647-29377-2
8	May 2, 2024	978-4-391-16238-7	April 8, 2025	978-1-647-29381-9
9	January 10, 2025	978-4-391-16400-8	December 30, 2025	978-1-647-29501-1
10	September 5, 2025	978-4-391-16566-1	—	—
11	April 3, 2026	978-4-391-16763-4	—	—

=== Anime ===
In August 2022, it was announced that the novels would be adapted into an anime television series. It was produced by Zero-G and Digital Network Animation, and directed by Takashi Asami, with scripts written by Hiroki Uchida, character designs handled by Miori Suzuki, and music composed by Masato Kōda. The series aired from October 4 to December 20, 2023, on Tokyo MX and other networks. The opening theme song is "Ikenai Etranger" (イケナイエトランゼ), performed by VTuber Yui Hizuki, and the ending theme song is "Graceful World", performed by Saori Hayami. Crunchyroll is streaming the series outside of Asia.

==== Episodes ====
No.	Title (Note: All English titles are taken from Crunchyroll.)	Directed by (Note: Information is taken from the ending credits of each episode.)	Written by	Storyboarded by	Original release date
1	"Naughty Encounter"; Transliteration: "Ikenai Deai" (Japanese: イケナイ出逢い)	Takashi Asami	Hiroki Uchida	Takashi Asami	October 4, 2023
Charlotte Evans—a noblewoman in name only, who is framed for crimes she did not commit—is running from the royal guards through the forest when she has an accident. Allen Crawford, a powerful mage who lives in seclusion deep in the very same forest, senses something is amiss and ventures out to discover the unconscious woman. Allen questions her when she wakes and decides to help her by offering her a live-in maid job. When he learns about how sad her life has been, he further decides that he will show her all the worldly pleasures there are so she can be the happiest person alive.
2	"Naughty Way to Release Stress"; Transliteration: "Ikenai Sutoresu Kaishō-hō" (Japanese: イケナイストレス解消法)	Takashi Asami	Hiroki Uchida	Hiroyuki Shimazu	October 11, 2023
Allen tries to think up new ways to teach Charlotte "naughty" things and ends up staying up all night. The next morning, a courier named Miacha arrives to take Allen's potions to the city for sale, revealing that this is how he earns a living. With a suggestion from Miacha, Allen has Charlotte choose items from a catalogue to buy while he himself buys a punching bag for her to release her stress on. However, Charlotts is too good-natured to feel resentment and her trauma runs deep, so it doesn't go as planned.
3	"Naughty Show Down"; Transliteration: "Ikenai Taiketsu" (Japanese: イケナイ対決)	Akihiro Izumi	Yūki Nōtsuka	Ichizō Kobayashi	October 18, 2023
Allen's younger adoptive sister, Eruca, arrives after tracking him down, and some of Allen's past is revealed. Eruca takes an instant interest in Charlotte, and when she claims she can teach her "naughty" things women "actually want", it results in a showdown between siblings to see who can teach Charlotte better. Allen also tasks Eruca with finding out more about Charlotte's life in her home country. After a day of shopping and splurging, Allen gifts Charlotte a special hairpin and rescues her from some thugs.
4	"Naughty Outing"; Transliteration: "Ikenai Odekake" (Japanese: イケナイお出かけ)	Yūsuke Onoda	Yūsuke Kaneko	Yūsuke Onoda	October 25, 2023
The boss of the thugs turns out to be Megath, an acquaintance of Allen's from his magic academy days, and Eruca further reveals to Charlotte that their father is the chairperson for the academy. Allen also struggles to define who or what Charlotte is to him, and Charlotte asks to go into town alone. Allen, Eruca, and Miacha tail her to make sure nothing happens. Over the course of the day, Allen accidentally makes the entire town safer by taking out various gangs to protect Charlotte. Charlotte gives Eruca and Miacha gifts she bought with her first paycheck and tells Allen that she searched all day for a gift for him, but realized she didn't know what he liked. Instead, she asks to mend his cloak and that he tell her about what he likes.
5	"Naughty Hot Spring Trip"; Transliteration: "Ikenai Onsen Ryokō" (Japanese: イケナイ温泉旅行)	Yū Yabuuchi	Hiroki Uchida	Daisuke Kurose	November 1, 2023
6	"Naughty Zoo"; Transliteration: "Ikenai Dōbutsuen" (Japanese: イケナイ動物園)	Yūsuke Onoda	Hiroki Uchida	Yūsuke Onoda	November 8, 2023
7	"Naughty Resident"; Transliteration: "Ikenai Jūnin" (Japanese: イケナイ住人)	Kazuya Kitō	Yūsuke Kaneko	Daisuke Kurose	November 15, 2023
8	"Naughty Skits"; Transliteration: "Ikenai Sungeki" (Japanese: イケナイ寸劇)	Yūsuke Onoda	Yūki Nōtsuka	Yūsuke Onoda	November 22, 2023
9	"Naughty Visit to the Parents"; Transliteration: "Ikenai Jikka Hōmon" (Japanese: イケナイ実家訪問)	Hiroshi Maejima & Kayoko Suzuki	Yūki Nōtsuka	Fumikazu Satō	November 29, 2023
10	"Naughty Reunion"; Transliteration: "Ikenai Saikai" (Japanese: イケナイ再会)	Yūsuke Onoda	Yūsuke Kaneko	Fumikazu Satō & Yūsuke Onoda	December 6, 2023
11	"Naughty Dungeon"; Transliteration: "Ikenai Danjon" (Japanese: イケナイダンジョン)	Takashi Asami	Hiroki Uchida	Shin Matsuo	December 13, 2023
12	"Naughty = Happiness"; Transliteration: "Ikenai = Shiawase" (Japanese: イケナイ=幸せ)	Yūsuke Onoda & Takashi Asami	Hiroki Uchida	Hiroyuki Shimazu	December 20, 2023

== Reception ==
In 2021, the manga adaptation was nominated in the Next Manga Awards in the web manga category.

== See also ==
- Isshō Hatarakitakunai Ore ga, Classmate no Daininki Idol ni Natsukaretara, another light novel series illustrated by Sakura Miwabe
- Rich Girl Caretaker, another light novel series illustrated by Sakura Miwabe
