= Rich Girl Caretaker =

Japanese light novel series

- Rich Girl Caretaker: I'm Secretly the Caregiver of the Most Popular Girl in This Rich Kid School
- First light novel volume cover, featuring Hinako Konohana

才女のお世話 高嶺の花だらけな名門校で、学院一のお嬢様（生活能力皆無）を陰ながらお世話することになりました (Saijo no Osewa: Takane no Hana-darake na Meimonkō de, Gakuin-ichi no Ojō-sama (Seikatsu Nōryoku Kai Mu) o Kage nagara Osewa suru Koto ni Narimashita)
- Genre: Romantic comedy
- Novel series
- Written by: Yusaku Sakaishi
- Published by: Shōsetsuka ni Narō
- Original run: April 2, 2020 – October 26, 2021
- Light novel
- Written by: Yusaku Sakaishi
- Illustrated by: Sakura Miwabe
- Published by: Hobby Japan
- English publisher: Monogatari Novels
- Imprint: HJ Bunko
- Original run: May 1, 2021 – present
- Volumes: 12
- Manga
- Written by: Yusaku Sakaishi
- Illustrated by: Sorahiko Mizushima
- Published by: Hobby Japan
- Imprint: HJ Comics
- Magazine: Comic Fire
- Original run: July 2, 2021 – present
- Volumes: 7
- Anime television series
- Directed by: Shūsei Morishita
- Written by: Aya Yoshinaga
- Music by: Natsumi Tabuchi; Hanae Nakamura; Mayo Kurihara
- Studio: Brain's Base
- Licensed by: Crunchyroll: SEA: Plus Media Networks Asia
- Original network: MBS, TV Tokyo, BS Asahi
- Original run: July 5, 2026 – September 20, 2026
- Episodes: 12
- icon

Rich Girl Caretaker: I'm Secretly the Caregiver of the Most Popular Girl in This Rich Kid School (Japanese: 才女のお世話 高嶺の花だらけな名門校で、学院一のお嬢様（生活能力皆無）を陰ながらお世話することになりました, Hepburn: Saijo no Osewa: Takane no Hana-darake na Meimonkō de, Gakuin-ichi no Ojō-sama (Seikatsu Nōryoku Kai Mu) o Kage nagara Osewa suru Koto ni Narimashita) is a Japanese light novel series written by Yusaku Sakaishi and illustrated by Sakura Miwabe. It began as a web novel posted on the Shōsetsuka ni Narō website between April 2020 and October 2021, before it was published by Hobby Japan under their HJ Bunko imprint in May 2021. A manga adaptation illustrated by Sorahiko Mizushima began serialization on Hobby Japan's Comic Fire website in July 2021. An anime television series adaptation produced by Brain's Base aired from July to September 2026.

== Plot ==
Itsuki Tomonari, a high school student who comes from a poor family, is suddenly abandoned by his parents. He is faced with a difficult family situation and the possibility of being unable to go to school owing to his financial situation. He then meets Hinako Konohana, the scion of a wealthy family, when they are both kidnapped. During the encounter, Hinako quickly develops a liking towards Itsuki, much to his chagrin, and gives him a chance of living under the Konohana family and transferring to Hinako's school, now serving as Hinako's caretaker. Hinako finds herself falling in love with Itsuki, and tries in vain to win his heart without being obvious, but his passive aggressive attitude towards her on top of other girls seemingly being attracted to him makes her worry he might reject her.

== Characters ==
Itsuki Tomonari (友成 伊月, Tomonari Itsuki)
Voiced by: Yūto Uemura
A high school student who comes from a poor family and works part-time jobs in order to earn money. His parents are gambling addicts and suddenly left home one night, leaving him with barely any money. After being kidnapped together with Hinako, he transfers to Kiou Academy, an exclusive school for the rich and powerful, while also living with the Konohana family and working as a servant. In order to prevent others from finding out about his past, he claims to come from a family involved in the IT industry.
Hinako Konohana (此花 雛子, Konohana Hinako)
Voiced by: Moe Toyota (PV), Konomi Kohara (anime)
A high school student who comes from the Konohana family, one of Japan's richest families. She acts as the perfect student in school, but in reality she is lazy and unable to do most tasks on her own. However, in order to protect her family's reputation, she has to keep the image of a rich lady. She develops feelings for Itsuki after they were kidnapped and pampers him. She is closely attached to Itsuki, to the point that she got jealous when he spent several days with the Tennōji family. Her mother died prior to the events of the story.
Shizune Tsurumi (鶴見 静音, Tsurumi Shizune)
Voiced by: Ami Koshimizu
One of the Konohana family's maids. She has a cool and strict personality. She cares for Hinako while also training Itsuki to serve as Hinako's servant.
Mirei Tennōji (天王寺 美麗, Ten'nōji Mirei)
Voiced by: Saori Ōnishi
A Kiou Academy student who is the scion of the Tennōji Group, also one of the largest in Japan. She considers herself to be Hinako's rival academically.
Narika Miyakojima (都島 成香, Miyakojima Narika)
Voiced by: Rio Tsuchiya
A Kiou Academy student whose family runs a company manufacturing sporting goods. She has a very shy personality and thus has difficulty communicating with others. She specialises in Martial Arts.
Yuri Hirano (平野 百合, Hirano Yui)
Voiced by: Kaede Hondo
Itsuki's childhood friend, who is older than him. She refers to herself as Itsuki's "older sister".
Karen Asahi (旭 可憐, Asahi Karen)
Voiced by: Ami Maeshima
Itsuki and Hinako's classmate who initially introduces herself as a commoner student, but is actually from a family that owns one of Japan's biggest electronics companies.
Katsuya Taishō (大正 克也, Taishō Katsuya)
Voiced by: Kentarō Kumagai
Itsuki and Hinako's classmate who initially introduces himself as a commoner student, but is actually from a family that owns a large transportation company.
Kagen Konohana (此花 華厳, Konohana Kagen)
Voiced by: Takehito Koyasu
Hinako's father and the chairman of one of the Konohana Group's companies. He is in line to become the group's next leader.

== Media ==
=== Light novel ===
Written by Yusaku Sakaishi and illustrated by Sakura Miwabe, Rich Girl Caretaker: I'm Secretly the Caregiver of the Most Popular Girl in This Rich Kid School began as a web novel posted on the Shōsetsuka ni Narō website, with chapters being posted between April 2, 2020, and October 26, 2021. Hobby Japan later began publishing the series as a light novel under their HJ Bunko imprint, with the first novel being released on May 1, 2021. A promotional video with Moe Toyota voicing Hinako was posted on YouTube on September 20, 2021. Twelve volumes have been released as of July 2026. The series is licensed in English by Monogatari Novels, but no releases were made.

No.	Original release date	Original ISBN	English release date	English ISBN
1	May 1, 2021	978-4-7986-2491-4	March 3, 2026 (unreleased)	978-8-4127-2682-4
2	December 1, 2021	978-4-7986-2677-2	March 3, 2026(unreleased)	978-8-4100-2013-9
3	April 30, 2022	978-4-7986-2823-3	March 3, 2026(unreleased)	978-8-4100-2014-6
4	September 1, 2022	978-4-7986-2916-2	—	—
5	February 1, 2023	978-4-7986-3073-1	—	—
6	June 30, 2023	978-4-7986-3220-9	—	—
7	December 1, 2023	978-4-7986-3361-9	—	—
8	May 1, 2024	978-4-7986-3530-9	—	—
9	November 1, 2024	978-4-7986-3667-2	—	—
10	May 30, 2025	978-4-7986-3859-1	—	—
11	October 31, 2025	978-4-7986-3995-6	—	—
12	July 1, 2026	978-4-7986-4211-6	—	—

=== Manga ===
A manga adaptation illustrated by Sorahiko Mizushima began serialization on Hobby Japan's Comic Fire website on July 2, 2021, with the first volume being released on June 1, 2022. Seven tankōbon volumes have been released as of October 2026.

No.	Japanese release date	Japanese ISBN
1	June 1, 2022	978-4-7986-2647-5
2	May 1, 2023	978-4-7986-3172-1
3	October 1, 2024	978-4-7986-3172-1
4	July 1, 2025	978-4-7986-3893-5
5	December 1, 2025	978-4-7986-4021-1
6	June 1, 2026	978-4-7986-4187-4
7	October 1, 2026	978-4-7986-4262-8

=== Anime ===
An anime adaptation was announced on October 30, 2025, which was later confirmed to be a television series produced by Brain's Base and directed by Shūsei Morishita, with Aya Yoshinaga handling series composition, Nao Kawashima designing the characters, and Natsumi Tabuchi, Hanae Nakamura, and Mayo Kurihara composing the music. The series aired from July 5 to September 20, 2026, on MBS and other networks. (Note: MBS listed the series premiere on July 4 at 26:38, which is effectively July 5 at 2:38 a.m. JST.) The opening theme song is "Sai Sai Saikōkyū no Osewa Shite" (最最最高級のお世話して; Top Top Top Grade Caretaking), is performed by Angela, while the ending theme song is "Kanpeki Janai Watashi" (完璧じゃないわたし; I'm Not Perfect), performed by Ami Maeshima. Crunchyroll is streaming the series. Plus Media Networks Asia has licensed the series in Southeast Asia.

==== Episodes ====
No.	Title	Directed by (Note: Production staff information is taken from the ending credits of each episode.)	Storyboarded by	Original release date
1	"A Perfect Young Lady"; Transliteration: "Kanpeki na Ojōsama" (Japanese: 完璧なお嬢様)	Shūsei Morishita	Shūsei Morishita	July 5, 2026
Raised in poverty by gambling addict parents who eventually steal his money and skip town, Itsuki Tomonari wanders aimlessly until he gets caught up in the kidnapping of Hinako Konohana, a wealthy heiress. Itsuki realizes Hinako is completely absent-minded and lacks basic life skills, leading him to resent her almost immediately. However, much to his dismay Hinako takes a liking to him just as soldiers from Konohana Conglomerate, led by her maid Shizune, rescue them. Learning Itsuki's financial circumstances, Hinako's wealthy father, Kagen, explains the situation. Hinako can act like a perfect heiress in public, but reverts to a helpless lump when alone or tired. For the Conglomerate's future, Hinako must one day find an excellent husband, so her true nature must remain secret. As Hinako is now attached to Itsuki, something that deeply disturbs him, Kagen offers him the role of Caretaker in exchange for free lodging, enrollment at Kiou Gakuin Academy with Hinako, and ¥20,000 a day. Shizune begins training Itsuki in etiquette, caretaking, and self-defense, but reminds him to keep his grades up as he will obviously lose the job if he is expelled. His first challenge arises when he finds Hinako sleeping in his bed, followed by her jealousy over texts from his childhood friend, Yuri.
2	"Caretaker Day 1"; Transliteration: "Osewa Gakari Dai-ichi-Hi" (Japanese: お世話係 第一日)	Haruka Kanbara	Shūsei Morishita	July 12, 2026 (Note: Due to the broadcast of the 2026 FIVB Women's Volleyball Nations League, this episode aired at 2:05 a.m. JST, 33 minutes before the regular air time on MBS.)
At Kiou, Itsuki struggles with advanced subjects meant for elite students. Classmates Katsuya and Karen assume he is a fellow new-money commoner, which aligns with his fake backstory as a new CEO's son. As they are interested in why he walked Hinako to school, Itsuki claims their parents are acquainted. Later, Hinako reveals her past caretakers quit quickly and asks Itsuki to stay long-term in case she decides to marry him, shocking him. Shizune calls, warning him not to underestimate Katsuya and Karen, whose families own powerful corporations. Itsuki meets Tennoji Mirei, who is insulted he doesn't know her Tennoji Mining Conglomerate and blames Hinako for overshadowing her. After school, Hinako almost becomes a useless lump on school grounds, so he bribes her into moving with potato chips. Shizune reveals past caretakers failed because they were too strict, making Itsuki their first commoner caretaker. Later, Hinako makes Itsuki share her pool-sized bath while wearing swimsuits. Seeing her almost naked makes Itsuki feel very uncomfortable, so he asks about her friends. Hinako refers to them as "fans", stating Itsuki is her only real friend. Itsuki is traumatized when Shizune, who had been watching them bathe, pranks him by threatening him with castration if anything sexual happens between them, which Itsuki panics and immediately reassures her he is not attracted to Hinako. Back at school, a girl from Itsuki's past reunites with him.
3	"Reunion"; Transliteration: "Saikai" (Japanese: 再会)	Haruka Kanbara	Shūsei Morishita	July 19, 2026
The girl Narika Miyakojima, a famous athlete with no friends due to rumours she is a Yakuza's daughter, is actually Itsuki's distant relative. Accused of endangering her life by taking her out in public, Itsuki has not seen Narika since they were ten. Narika drops her tough façade, clings to Itsuki, and asks for his help making friends. Hinako catches them together and becomes jealous when Narika reveals they were childhood friends, so she reveals Itsuki is her employee, forgetting this is a strict secret. Shizune decides not to punish Itsuki since Hinako exposed the secret, but orders him to ensure Narika keeps it quiet. Katsuya and Karen plan a welcome party for Itsuki and Hinako insists on going. Itsuki claims to Narika he is a live-in business apprentice of the Konohana's, so she agrees not to talk about it. He invites her to the party to start making friends. He also invites Mirei. Narika panics to meet everyone, but Itsuki is able to clearly explain she is just socially awkward and has no connection to the Yakuza; her family actually own a sporting goods company. The party is a success but Narika still resents Hinako for taking Itsuki, and demands he come to her house once his apprenticeship is over.
4	"Lies and Secrets"; Transliteration: "Uso to Himitsu" (Japanese: 嘘と秘密)	Isamu Imakake	Haruto Ogawa	July 26, 2026 (Note: Due to program broadcast scheduling changes, this episode aired at 1:30 a.m. JST, 1 hour and 8 minutes before the regular air time on MBS.)
When Itsuki masters noble table manners, Shizune increases his responsibilities and entrusts him with waking Hinako each morning, an arduous, unpredictable task with the risk of occasional nudity, leaving Itsuki baffled and disgusted. Shortly after, Hinako faints in the shower. Shizune explains that the pressure of playing the perfect heiress frequently triggers fevers in Hinako. Disappointed that her father, Kagen, neglectsto visit during these illnesses and noting her mother has passed away, Itsuki begrudgingly decides to care for Hinako himself so she does not feel alone. Shizune then reveals a family secret: Hinako's older brother, Takuma, was deemed unfit to inherit the family conglomerate, meaning Hinako's future husband will inherit instead, hence why it is vital Hinako find a good husband. As midterms approach, top-ranked Hinako offers Itsuki private tutoring. However, Katsuya and Karen reunite the tea party group for a joint study session, frustrating Hinako, who punishes Itsuki for losing their one-on-one time by deliberately stepping on his foot. Mirei, the school's second-highest scorer, tutors Itsuki in math, further upsetting Hinako. Mirei suspects Itsuki is not actually a real CEO's heir but chooses to keep her suspicions to herself. Hinako invites the whole group to the Konohana Spring Social Event.
5	"Kidnap Me"; Transliteration: "Watashi o Saratte" (Japanese: 私をさらって)	Haruto Ogawa	Shūsei Morishita	August 2, 2026
Hinako ruins a formal dinner with an airline CEO by applying Itsuki's "three-second rule" to her dropped dessert, breaching noble etiquette and ruining Kagen's business negotiations. Furious, Kagen refuses to indulge Hinako's true personality anymore, fires Itsuki and orders Hinako to act as a perfect heiress 24 hours a day, even in private. Traumatized by Itsuki's absence, Hinako tries to escape her room. On the street Itsuki encounters Narika, who listens to his explanation and insists he did nothing wrong. Itsuki uses Shizune's martial arts to infiltrate the mansion in time to catch Hinako falling from her bedroom window. Itsuki decides to confront Kagen but Shizune stops him, secretly revealing she is on Hinako's side and has a plan. She shows Kagen letters from Katsuya, Karen, Narika and Mirei's CEO parents, who thanks to their friendships with Hinako, want to meet Kagen at his Spring Social Event. Forced to admit Itsuki's influence on Hinako has actually benefitted the family business, Kagen rehires Itsuki. He also reveals that Hinako's genius means she was always going to be running the company one day and only needs a respectable husband for appearances. Later, Hinako blushes when asking Itsuki for head pats, realizing her feelings for him have changed; Itsuki, on the other hand, remains completely oblivious, and his nonchalant way of patting her head makes her question if he even likes her at all.
6	"Tennoji Mirei's Proposal"; Transliteration: "Tennōji Mirei no Go Teian" (Japanese: 天王寺美麗のご提案)	Isamu Imakake	Shūsei Morishita	August 9, 2026
Confused by her feelings for Itsuki, Hinako stops letting him wake her in the mornings. After Hinako tops midterms while Mirei places second, Mirei is more disappointed that Itsuki scored below average despite her help and proposes further tutoring in academics and etiquette to boost his confidence. Kagen approves of Itsuki expanding Hinako's circle of friends for future business opportunities, but Hinako dislikes his lessons with Mirei and distance grows between them. Shizune reassures a confused Hinako that her feelings will become clear the more time she spends with Itsuki. Mirei hosts the next etiquette lesson at her ornate mansion. Her father, Masatsugu, observes Itsuki's passable table manners and invites him to stay overnight when a thunderstorm appears. Shizune grants permission but warns Itsuki Hinako will not like it; however Itsuki doesn't seem to care and brushes it off. He is startled in the bath by Mirei's bikini-clad mother, Hanami. Mirei fumes at her mother but forgives Itsuki, declaring she might hire him as her aide if he becomes a top ten student by graduation. The next morning, Masatsugu asks Mirei to consider finding a trustworthy fiancé to protect the family wealth from opportunistic suitors. For her family's sake, Mirei agrees to find a fiancé.
7	"A Lady's Concerns"; Transliteration: "Ojōsama no Nayami" (Japanese: お嬢様の悩み)	Kafumi Fujita	Haruto Ogawa	August 16, 2026
Itsuki returns home and finds Hinako upset he spent the night at Mirei's house. Her mood improves once Itsuki demonstrates Mirei was teaching him etiquette so he could share meals with her. Satisfied with his progress, Shizune permits Itsuki to dine with Hinako daily, though she warns him to maintain perfect manners whenever Kagen is present. During his next etiquette lesson, Itsuki invites Narika to join him and Mirei, prompting her to wonder how he easily befriends such influential women. The conversation turns to arranged marriages; Narika prefers love but accepts the necessity of arranged marriages. Mirei is disappointed Itsuki wishes her well in finding a husband, rather than showing jealousy. As Mirei teaches him to dance, Itsuki learns their lessons must end once she is engaged. Touched by his disappointment, Mirei briefly considers hiring him to the Tennoji Group so they can stay connected, but realizes it would be improper once she is engaged. Hanami arranges Mirei's first meeting with a potential fiancé. Mirei reveals to Itsuki that as an adopted heir, a strategic marriage is required to secure her standing. Believing Itsuki is also an adopted CEO heir, she assumes he understands, leaving him guilty over hiding his true status as a simple Konohana employee.
8	"No Lies"; Transliteration: "Uso wa Nashi" (Japanese: 嘘はなし)	Isamu Imakake	Haruka Kamohara	August 23, 2026
After a boring marriage meeting, Mirei confides in Hanami, who notices her mood brightens at the mention of Itsuki. Mirei reveals Itsuki is the adopted heir to a Konohana Conglomerate IT company, a claim that confuses Hanami since the Konohana's do not own any IT companies. Mirei challenges Itsuki to a kendo duel, accusing him of making a fool of her and undermining her rivalry with Hinako. Itsuki admits to lying and discloses his work for the Konohanas, withholding only Hinako's true personality. Mirei forgives him after he promises never to lie again. At home, Itsuki learns Mirei already called Shizune to take responsibility for forcing him to admit the truth, and promise to keep their secret. Though relieved he keeps his job, Hinako kicks Itsuki for worrying her and spending more time with Mirei. Outraged the next day to learn Itsuki shares private lunches and head-pats with Hinako, Mirei intensifies his etiquette lessons. She reveals her newly chosen fiancé lives abroad, meaning she must leave the academy after defeating Hinako in upcoming exams. Sensing this is not what she truly desires, Itsuki invites Mirei to spend their next day off experiencing life as a commoner.
9	"The Lady's Day Off"; Transliteration: "Ojōsama no Kyūjitsu" (Japanese: お嬢様の休日)	Shūsei Morishita	Shūsei Morishita & Takafumi Fujī	August 30, 2026
Itsuki takes Mirei on a day out, which she treats as a date despite failing hilariously at arcade games, bowling, and karaoke. Yuri spots them together, making Itsuki feel guilty for neglecting her. Mirei gets upset when Itsuki suggests she can reject the arranged engagement to pursue her own happiness. Realizing her parents actually want her to relax, rather than making herself suffer for the Tennoji family name, Mirei speaks with her parents and cancels the arrangement. A week later Mirei and Hinako tie for first place with perfect scores on their exams, prompting Mirei to invite Hinako to her house as a genuine friend. When Masatsuga later teases Itsuki about marriage to Mirei, Mirei reprimands him, though she admits she would compete with Hinako for Itsuki's hand in marriage if it ever became serious. Upon learning about the date, Hinako demands Itsuki take her to the arcade, bowling, and karaoke too. Meanwhile, as the sports competition nears, Kagen demands Hinako win the tennis tournament. After Shizune hires a coach, claiming Hinako has gained weight, a suddenly motivated Hinako throws herself into daily training. Narika approaches Itsuki begging for help with her own sports competition troubles.
10	"The Plan to Free Narika from Isolation"; Transliteration: "Narika no Botchi Dakkyaku Keikaku" (Japanese: 成香のぼっち脱却計画)	Takafumi Fujī	Haruhito Ogawa	September 6, 2026
Narika reveals her kendo victory at the last sports competition scared people, so she struggled to make friends, and is afraid winning again this year will make it worse. Itsuki agrees to help her make friends if she coaches him and Hinako in tennis, despite Shizune warning that Kagen resents Narika for being better at sports than Hinako. Hinako notes that Narika's nervous expressions scare people off. Itsuki prompts Narika to blend in, but her attempts fail: her grades are too low to join a study group, her casual clothes make her look like a delinquent after a fight, and a classmate mistakes her eating a lollipop for smoking a cigarette, and Itsuki has to act fast to prevent a rumour starting. Despite these disasters, Narika honors the tennis coaching arrangement. When Itsuki suggests discussing the upcoming sports competition with people, he learns peers are intimidated by Narika's wealthy, powerful family, and that gossip now brands him a sycophant for associating with influential girls.
11	"The Lady's Showdown"; Transliteration: "Ojōsama no Taiketsu" (Japanese: お嬢様の対決)	Haruka Kamohara	Haruka Kamohara	September 13, 2026
To repair his reputation as a sycophant, Itsuki befriends Kita Yusuke, an IT CEO's heir who agrees to tutor him in computer science. During a study session, Narika nervously but successfully impresses Kita by comparing sports training to high-spec computers. This small interaction begins to slowly improve Narika's scary reputation. Following Mirei's advice to build her image one person at a time, Narika starts coaching her classmates in sports. Meanwhile, Itsuki studies hard to appear more like a CEO's son. After Hinako nearly confesses to him but pretends to sleep, an unaware Itsuki resolves to become worthy of her. Later, Itsuki dries Narika's hair after a training mishap, sparking intense jealousy in Hinako. This culminates in a tennis match between Narika and Hinako, with the winner earning a date with Itsuki. Throughout the match, they try to unnerve each other by flaunting their intimate moments with him. Narika ultimately wins, but a stubborn Hinako delays the date by citing Itsuki's busy schedule working for her father. To compensate for her loss, Hinako demands that Itsuki style her hair that night, settling on twin-tails.
12	"All Out of My League"; Transliteration: "Takane no Hana-darake" (Japanese: 高嶺の花だらけ)	Shūsei Morishita	Shūsei Morishita	September 20, 2026
Three days before the contest, Narika stops attending school. Visiting her, Itsuki apologizes to her father for taking her out years ago, only to realize the "scolding" he remembered was actually her intimidating father's gratitude for helping Narika have fun. Narika reveals she only sprained a finger and will still compete. For the date she won, Itsuki takes her to their childhood sweetshop, offering to go anywhere she wants after she admits jealousy over his dates with Hinako and Tennoji. At the contest, Itsuki and Hinako watch Tennoji's polo match and Katsuya's skiing. Touched by Itsuki's praise after two kendo wins, Narika confesses he is her irreplaceable person. Itsuki defeats Nada at tennis, the boy who called him a sycophant, who admits a crush on Hinako and agrees to apologize to Narika for upsetting her. Although Itsuki eventually loses the men's tennis championship, Hinako wins the women's championship. Overhearing the audience gossip about her intimidating nature during the kendo finals, Narika nearly loses on purpose. Urged by Hinako, Itsuki enthusiastically cheers her on, inspiring Narika to win. Itsuki proudly leads the clapping, joined by her parents, hoping one day he can stand alongside his friends as their equal.

== See also ==
- I'm Giving the Disgraced Noble Lady I Rescued a Crash Course in Naughtiness, another light novel series illustrated by Sakura Miwabe
- Isshō Hatarakitakunai Ore ga, Classmate no Daininki Idol ni Natsukaretara, another light novel series illustrated by Sakura Miwabe
