= Isshō Hatarakitakunai Ore ga, Classmate no Daininki Idol ni Natsukaretara =

Japanese light novel series

- First light novel volume cover

一生働きたくない俺が、クラスメイトの大人気アイドルに懐かれたら (Isshō Hatarakitakunai Ore ga, Kurasumeito no Daininki Aidoru ni Natsukaretara)
- Genre: Romantic comedy
- Novel series
- Written by: Kazuha Kishimoto
- Published by: Shōsetsuka ni Narō
- Original run: December 19, 2020 – present
- Light novel
- Written by: Kazuha Kishimoto
- Illustrated by: Sakura Miwabe
- Published by: Overlap
- Imprint: Overlap Bunko
- Original run: February 25, 2022 – present
- Volumes: 9
- Manga
- Written by: Kazuha Kishimoto
- Illustrated by: Yumi Misaki
- Published by: Overlap
- Imprint: Gardo Comics
- Magazine: Comic Gardo
- Original run: March 14, 2023 – present
- Volumes: 6

Isshō Hatarakitakunai Ore ga, Classmate no Daininki Idol ni Natsukaretara (Note: 一生働きたくない俺が、クラスメイトの大人気アイドルに懐かれたら, Isshō Hatarakitakunai Ore ga, Kurasumeito no Daininki Aidoru ni Natsukaretara), also known as Kuranatsu (クラなつ) for short, is a Japanese light novel series written by Kazuha Kishimoto and illustrated by Sakura Miwabe. It was originally published as a web novel on the online publication platform Shōsetsuka ni Narō, before Overlap began publishing it as a light novel in February 2022; nine volumes have been released as of April 2026. A manga adaptation illustrated by Yumi Misaki began serialization in Overlap's Comic Gardo service in March 2023, and has been compiled into six volumes as of August 2026.

== Plot ==
Rintaro Shido, a high school student studying at a private academy in Tokyo, is classmates with Rei Otosaki, a popular idol and a member of the group Mille-feuille Stars. One day, he encounters Rei on the street. Not wanting her to be recognized, and hearing that she is hungry, he invites her to his apartment. After he cooks her some food, she becomes attached to him and offers him to be her cook. Despite initially hesitating, he ultimately accepts, thus starting his relationship with a popular idol.

== Characters ==
Rintaro Shido (志藤 凛太郎, Shidō Rintarō)
A high school student studying at Heisei Private High School. He dreams of being a househusband, wanting to cook well for his future wife. Outside of school, he works part-time as an assistant to his manga artist cousin Himiko. He is currently living alone due to family circumstances, with Rei staying at his apartment after they start their relationship.
Rei Otosaki (乙咲 玲, Otosaki Rei)
Rintaro's classmate and a member of the idol group Mille-feuille Stars. She has blonde hair due to having foreign blood. In contrast to her personality as an idol, she shows a serious side in school, only opening up when she is around Rintaro. She comes from a rich family, with her father being disapproving of her career as an idol. Due to her rich upbringing, she found her housekeeper's cooking to be lacking in warmth, ultimately finding happiness in Rintaro's cooking.
Kanon Hidori (日鳥 夏音, Hidori Kanon)
A member of Mille-feuille Stars, who has an energetic and tsundere personality.
Mia Ugawa (宇川 美亜, Ugawa Mia)
A member of Mille-feuille Stars, who has a cool personality.
Yukio Inaba (稲葉 雪緒, Inaba Yukio)
Rintaro's best friend, who has an androgynous appearance.
Himiko Yuzuki (優月 一三子, Yuzuki Himiko)
Rintaro's cousin and homeroom teacher, who also works as a manga artist.
Azusa Nikaido (二階堂 梓, Nikaido Azusa)
Rintaro and Rei's class president, who secretly has feelings for Rintaro.
Yuzuka Tenguji (天宮司 柚香, Tengūji Yuzuka)
Rintaro's childhood friend.

== Media ==
=== Light novels ===
Kazuha Kishimoto originally began serializing the series as a web novel on the online publication platform Shōsetsuka ni Narō on December 19, 2020. It was later submitted to a contest for web novels by the publishing company Overlap under the title Daininki Idol na Classmate ni Natsukareta, Isshō Hatarakitakunai Ore (大人気アイドルなクラスメイトに懐かれた、一生働きたくない俺), where it received a Gold Prize for the first half of 2021. Overlap began publishing it as a light novel under their Overlap Bunko imprint, with the first volume being released on February 25, 2022. Nine volumes have been released as of April 20, 2026.

No.	Release date	ISBN
1	February 25, 2022	978-4-8240-0102-3
2	July 25, 2022	978-4-8240-0235-8
3	November 25, 2022	978-4-8240-0334-8
4	May 25, 2023	978-4-8240-0497-0
5	February 25, 2024	978-4-8240-0736-0
6	June 25, 2024	978-4-8240-0852-7
7	April 25, 2025	978-4-8240-1148-0
8	November 25, 2025	978-4-8240-1409-2
9	April 20, 2026	978-4-8240-1600-3

=== Manga ===
A manga adaptation illustrated by Yumi Misaki began serialization in Overlap's Comic Gardo service on March 14, 2023. The first tankōbon volume was released on August 25, 2023; six volumes have been released as of August 20, 2026.

No.	Release date	ISBN
1	August 25, 2023	978-4-8240-0590-8
2	March 25, 2024	978-4-8240-0772-8
3	October 25, 2024	978-4-8240-0978-4
4	May 25, 2025	978-4-8240-1198-5
5	January 25, 2026	978-4-8240-1465-8
6	August 20, 2026	978-4-8240-1810-6

== Reception ==
It was reported with the release of the ninth light novel volume in April 2026 that the series had over 300,000 copies in circulation.

== See also ==
- I'm Giving the Disgraced Noble Lady I Rescued a Crash Course in Naughtiness, another light novel series by the same illustrator
- Rich Girl Caretaker, another light novel series by the same illustrator
- Summoned to Another World... Again?, another light novel series by the same author
