= Black Clover season 1 =

Black Clover
- Season 1
- Cover art for the first Japanese home media volume as released by Avex Pictures, featuring Asta
- No. of episodes: 170

Release
- Original network: TV Tokyo
- Original release: October 3, 2017 – March 30, 2021

Season chronology
- Next → Season 2

The first season of the Japanese anime television series Black Clover was directed by Tatsuya Yoshihara and produced by Studio Pierrot. It is based on the manga series Black Clover by Yūki Tabata. The series is set in a world where magic is a common everyday part of people's lives, and is centered around Asta, one of the only known persons to not be able to use magic. Asta as well as his friend, rival, and adoptive brother Yuno, aspire to become the wizard king. However, to most people it would seem that Asta had no chance of becoming wizard king while Yuno was famous in his village as a prodigy.

The season initially ran from October 3, 2017, to March 30, 2021, on TV Tokyo in Japan; Avex Pictures released it on DVD and Blu-ray in sixteen compilations (each containing nine to 11 episodes) between February 23, 2018, and June 25, 2021. Crunchyroll and Funimation licensed the series for an English-language release, with Crunchyroll simulcasting the series worldwide and Funimation producing a North American Simuldub. Funimation's adaptation aired from December 2, 2017, to October 10, 2021, on Adult Swim's Toonami programming block, and they released the first DVD and Blu-ray compilations on August 7, 2018.

== Episodes ==
| No. overall | No. in season | Title (Note: English translated titles with notes next to them denote alternative titles used by Funimation before its merger into Crunchyroll in April 2024.) | Directed by (Note: Production staff information is taken from the ending credits of each episode.) | Written by (Note: Labelled as "Scenario" (シナリオ)) | Chief animation directed by | Original release date | English air date |
|---|---|---|---|---|---|---|---|
Magic Knights Entrance Arc
| 1 | 1 | "Asta and Yuno"; Transliteration: "Asuta to Yuno" (Japanese: アスタとユノ) | Tatsuya Yoshihara | Kazuyuki Fudeyasu | Ikuko Matsushita & Itsuko Takeda | October 3, 2017 | December 2, 2017 |
In the Clover Kingdom, orphans Asta (an outgoing, competitive boy) and Yuno (a quiet boy with an affinity for magic) want to become the next Wizard King, the most powerful wizard in the kingdom. One day, Asta and Yuno attend a magic ceremony to each receive a Grimoire suited to their abilities. Although each grimoire has a picture of a standard three-leaf clover on the cover (symbolising integrity, hope and love), Yuno receives an extremely-rare Four-leaf clover grimoire (symbolizing good luck), while Asta is embarrassed when he does not receive a grimoire. Yuno is attacked by a disgraced former magic knight, Revchi Salik, who intends to steal the four-leaf clover grimoire. Asta tries to intervene but is badly beaten by the thief's Chain Magic, who ridicules him for having zero magic potential. Asta's determination to win and Yuno's words of friendship summons a damaged black grimoire with a legendary five-leaf clover, which supposedly symbolizes the Devil.
| 2 | 2 | "The Boys' Oath" (Note: Funimation's English translation for episode 2 was "A Young Man's Vow"); Transliteration: "Shōnen no Chikai" (Japanese: 少年の誓い) | Tatsuya Yoshihara | Kazuyuki Fudeyasu | Shunji Akasaka & Takaya Sunagawa | October 10, 2017 | December 9, 2017 |
In a flashback, a young Asta spends most of his time trying to propose to Sister Lily. He and Yuno are inspired by the tale of how the first Wizard King slayed the giant demon whose skeleton lays outside of Hage, and Asta says that he will become Wizard King some day. Yuno is asked to deliver an important letter to the chief of the next village, and is attacked and beaten on his way home by a thief who takes the necklace he was found holding when he was a baby. Yuno is too scared to fight back with his Wind Magic. Although he is seriously injured in his fight with the thief, Asta gets the necklace back when the thief becomes bored. Yuno wants to become as brave as Asta is, and announces that he is Asta's rival and will become the Wizard King before Asta does. In the present, Asta uses his black grimoire to summon a giant black sword that can cut though magic and effortlessly defeats Revchi. Asta and Yuno reaffirm their promise to remain friendly rivals until one of them becomes the Wizard King.
| 3 | 3 | "To the Royal Capital of the Clover Kingdom!" (Note: Funimation's English translation for episode 3 was "To the Royal Capital!"); Transliteration: "Kurōbā Ōkoku, Ōto e!" (Japanese: クローバー王国、王都へ！) | Directed by : Akira Shimizu; Storyboarded by : Yukihiro Matsushita | Kazuyuki Fudeyasu | Ikuko Matsushita & Mifumi Tomita | October 17, 2017 | December 16, 2017 |
Asta and Yuno train relentlessly for the Magic Knight Selection exam, hoping to become a member of the Magic Knight squads, nine squads of knights who use magic for combat under the command of the Wizard King to defend the Clover Kingdom. Asta and Yuno's rivalry reaches a new height of childish competitiveness. Father Orgi and Sister Lily host a going-away party, congratulating Yuno on his expected future success and subtly reminding Asta that when he fails he can always return home. Nash, an orphan, tells Asta that if he becomes a Magic Knight it might mean that everyone's dreams can come true – even those of commoners and orphans. Asta and Yuno leave for the capital city – a journey of several days on foot – continuing to train as they travel and growing far stronger, although Yuno still outperforms Asta with magic (accomplishing tasks for which Asta must use strength and skill). They arrive at the capital city and the Magic Knight exam, where success involves proving themselves more powerful than the other Magic Knight candidates.
| 4 | 4 | "The Magic Knights Entrance Exam"; Transliteration: "Mahō Kishidan Nyūdan Shiken" (Japanese: 魔法騎士団入団試験) | Ayataka Tanemura | Kazuyuki Fudeyasu | Takaya Sunagawa & Shunji Akasaka | October 24, 2017 | January 6, 2018 (Note: Adult Swim showed a Cowboy Bebop marathon on December 23–24, 2017 and a Dragon Ball Super marathon on December 30–31, 2017) |
Asta and Yuno register for the exam, and learn that Yuno is already known for receiving the four-leaf-clover grimoire. They are ridiculed by the noble candidates. The exam hall is filled with Anti-birds, who are attracted to people with less magic. Asta is pestered by a flock of Anti-birds, who ignore Yuno. He is approached by Sekke Bronzazza, an arrogant mage who offers to help Asta with the exam. As the exam progresses, Yuno outperforms the other candidates; Asta fails, and Sekke shows off his skill at his expense. The final test is a one-on-one duel; Sekke chooses Asta as his opponent, revealing his contempt for Asta's lack of magic and his own desire to become a Magic Knight for the easy lifestyle. As the duel begins, Sekke summons a magic shield with his Bonze Magic in the hope that Asta will embarrass himself trying to get past it; Asta summons his sword and defeats Sekke, however, repeating his promise to achieve his dream of becoming the Wizard King.
| 5 | 5 | "The Path to the Wizard King" (Note: Funimation's English translation for episode 5 was "The Road to the Wizard King"); Transliteration: "Mahōtei e no Michi" (Japanese: 魔法帝への道) | Directed by : Takeyuki Sadohara; Storyboarded by : Yukihiro Matsushita | Kazuyuki Fudeyasu | Chiaki Satō & Itsuko Takeda | October 31, 2017 | January 13, 2018 |
Despite his easy victory, Asta is ridiculed for his dream of becoming the Wizard King. Yuno is approached by Salim de Hapshass, an arrogant nobleman who is confident that his skill and power is far superior to that of a commoner. Although Salim uses his most-powerful spell to mock Yuno, he is easily defeated. With the duels concluded, the squad captains choose the candidates they want; many fail, and are sent home. Yuno is selected by all nine squad captains (which is unheard-of) and joins the Golden Dawn, which usually accepts only royalty and nobility. Asta is almost sent home when Yami Sukehiro, the intimidating captain of the Black Bulls, accepts him. Sekke, accepted by the less-prestigious Green Mantis squad, decides to get revenge and summons a lizard whose poisonous bite would cripple Asta for life. Yuno destroys the lizard, however, and Sekke flees. Asta is brought to the Black Bulls' hideout, rushes inside to introduce himself and is struck by a magical explosion. As he is thrown backwards, Yami welcomes him to the Black Bulls – the worst Magic Knight squad in the kingdom.
| 6 | 6 | "The Black Bulls"; Transliteration: "Kuro no Bōgyū" (Japanese: 黒の暴牛) | Directed by : Yūji Tokuno; Storyboarded by : Tasuku Aku | Kazuyuki Fudeyasu | Shunji Akasaka, Takaya Sunagawa & Makoto Shimojima | November 7, 2017 | January 20, 2018 |
At Golden Dawn headquarters, Yuno encounters Klaus Lunette (a Golden Dawn Knight who questions his worthiness as a member). Asta discovers that the explosion was caused by two Black Bull Knights fighting, and several other knights are behaving oddly. Yami proves his strength by bringing them all to heel with a single furious glare. Asta learns that he has been accepted into the Bulls, but he must earn his robe. After Yami gives Asta a series of tests, he arranges a duel with Magna Swing (a young knight who specialises in Flame Magic to throw fireballs with a flaming baseball bat). Asta uses his the flat of his sword to deflect Magna's fireball back at him. With his training complete, Asta is welcomed to the Black Bulls and receives his robe with the Black Bull symbol.
| 7 | 7 | "The Other New Recruit" (Note: Funimation's English translation for episode 7 was "Another New Member"); Transliteration: "Mō Hitori no Shin Nyūdan'in" (Japanese: もう一人の新入団員) | Directed by : Yoshizō Tsuda; Storyboarded by : Yukihiro Matsushita | Kazuyuki Fudeyasu | Kosei Takahashi & Shunji Akasaka | November 14, 2017 | January 27, 2018 |
Asta and Yuno write letters to the orphanage, who are surprised (and proud) that they have become Magic Knights. Asta meets Noelle Silva, the youngest daughter of the Silva royal family and the Black Bulls' second-newest recruit. Noelle ridicules Asta as a commoner, he easily defeats her, and she leaves the squad. When he sees Noelle practice, Asta realises that she cannot control her magic. In a flashback, Noelle's family mocks her and refuses her entrance into the Silver Eagles (the squad to which her family has belonged for generations). In the present, she accidentally traps herself in a giant water bubble. When Asta finds Noelle, Yami forces him to rescue her. Realising that the Bulls have accepted her for who she is, she rejoins the squad.
| 8 | 8 | "Go! Go! First Mission" (Note: Funimation's English translation for episode 8 was "Go! Go! My First Mission"); Transliteration: "Gō Gō Hatsu Ninmu" (Japanese: ゴーゴー初任務) | Directed by : Shintarō Itoga; Storyboarded by : Kazuo Miyake | Kazuyuki Fudeyasu | Shunji Akasaka & Takaya Sunagawa | November 21, 2017 | February 3, 2018 |
Asta is assigned to do household chores for the Black Bulls, and quickly realises that he has no idea what Magic Knights actually do. Yami takes Magna on a dangerous mission (their code name for gambling). They lose everything in a poker game with Seihi, the chief of the village of Saussy, who agrees to forgive their debt if they go to Saussy and deal with giant boars capable of fire magic. On Crazy Cyclone (his flying broomstick), Magna travels with Asta and Noelle to the village. A group of evil magicians led by Heath Grice, a rogue Ice magician, also arrive at Saussy.
| 9 | 9 | "Beasts"; Transliteration: "Kemono" (Japanese: 獣(けもの)) | Directed by : Rokō Ogiwara; Storyboarded by : Yukihiro Matsushita | Kazuyuki Fudeyasu | Itsuko Takeda | November 28, 2017 | February 10, 2018 |
Grice and his magicians enter Saussy to search for a magic stone, and Asta kills the boars. Magna remembers his past as a troublemaker who was convinced to join the Magic Knights after Seihi defeated him. Using his sword (which can nullify any magic), Asta destroys the mist barrier and enters Saussy as Grice tries to kill them. Magna protects the villagers, but realises that Seihi has been killed. Grice tries to crush them with a giant ice ball, which Asta slices in half. Grice then attacks with ice spikes from all directions and, despite Asta and Magna's best efforts, several villagers are injured. Grice arrogantlly justify his actions by stating his believe that people with weak magic are no more than beasts that only deserve death. Noelle tries to attack Grice and misses him, forcing Asta and Magna to intervene. When a terrified young girl begs for help, Noelle's protective instincts unlock a new spell in her grimoire: a giant water shield which protects the villagers from the ice.
| 10 | 10 | "Those Who Protect" (Note: Funimation's English translation for episode 10 was "Guardians"); Transliteration: "Mamoru-mono" (Japanese: 護る者) | Ayataka Tanemura | Kazuyuki Fudeyasu | Kosei Takahashi | December 5, 2017 | February 17, 2018 |
As Asta is quickly overpowered by Grice's attacks, Magna flashes back to when he became a Magic Knight and the Seihi gave him the pouch he uses to carry his grimoire. Grice blocks most of his attacks, but several fly past him; Asta deflects them with the flat of his sword, defeating Grice and most of his magicians. Hiding in Asta's robe, an Anti-bird finds the stone for which Grice was looking. Grice kills himself and his magicians to avoid interrogation. Before departing, Asta, Noelle, and Magna encourage Seihi's grandson Nick to pursue his dream of being a magic knight The Anti-bird keeps the stone, and begins living on Asta's head. Grice's master decides that he can retrieve the stone later as he prepares for "the Resurrection".
Dungeon Exploration Arc
| 11 | 11 | "What Happened on a Certain Day in the Castle Town" (Note: Funimation's English translation for episode 11 was "What Happened One Day in the Castle Town"); Transliteration: "Toaru Hi no Jōkamachi de no Dekigoto" (Japanese: とある日の城下町での出来事) | Directed by : Yoshito Hata; Storyboarded by : Yukihiro Matsushita | Kazuyuki Fudeyasu | Shunji Akasaka, Takaya Sunagawa & Itsuko Takeda | December 12, 2017 | February 24, 2018 |
After Grice's death, the Wizard King gives the Black Bulls a star for saving Saussy. Stars represent service achievements in the Clover Kingdom, and the nine magic squads compete to earn them. The current champions are Golden Dawn, with 70 stars; the Black Bulls fail so often that their score is −30. Asta receives his earnings for the month (200,000 Yul – Clover Kingdom currency), and sends most of it home to the orphanage. Vanessa Enoteca, a beautiful Black Bull member who wears revealing clothes and is frequently drunk, takes Noelle and Asta to the Black Market. Despite her distaste for its criminal atmosphere, Noelle tries to find items which might help her control her magic. Sekke, who now does only minor jobs for the Green Mantises and has become a gambling addict, tries to flirt with Noelle and Vanessa and is annoyed to learn that the two beautiful young women are with Asta. A thief suddenly steals an old woman's bag, and Asta rushes to catch him.
| 12 | 12 | "The Wizard King Saw"; Transliteration: "Mahōtei wa Mita" (Japanese: 魔法帝は見た) | Directed by : Takashi Asami; Storyboarded by : Yukihiro Matsushita | Kazuyuki Fudeyasu | Makoto Shimojima | December 19, 2017 | March 3, 2018 |
Asta and Sekke capture the thief, and Asta returns the woman's stolen property. The woman reveals herself as Wizard King Julius Novachrono, who (as a magic nerd) is intrigued with Asta's unheard-of Anti-Magic. Yuno is on his first mission with Klaus and second new recruit Mimosa Vermillion (like Noelle, a royal) as security for Salim de Hapshass, the noble whom Yuno defeated in the exam. Klaus is suspicious of Salim's requesting Yuno, since his defeat meant that no squad wanted him. Salim learns that Yuno came from the village of Hage. They are attacked by bandits, and Salim suggests that they spend the night in nearby Hage. Yuno is welcomed home enthusiastically, and Salim wants to stay a while.
| 13 | 13 | "The Wizard King Saw, Continued"; Transliteration: "Zoku Mahōtei wa Mita" (Japanese: 続・魔法帝は見た) | Directed by : Matsuo Asami; Storyboarded by : Kazuo Miyake | Kazuyuki Fudeyasu | Itsuko Takeda & Kosei Takahashi | December 26, 2017 | March 10, 2018 |
Sister Lily is kidnapped by the bandits. Yuno realises that the bandits wanted him, not Salim. He finds Sister Lily with them in Asta's hideout, under the giant demon skull. Their leader demands Yuno's four-leaf-clover grimoire. Klaus and Mimosa defeat the bandits in an ambush with their respective Steel and Plant Magic. Klaus reveals that Mimosa interrogated Salim with her Plant Magic, summoning a plant which speaks its victim's thoughts. Salim wanted revenge for losing to Yuno in the exam, and hired the bandits to steal his grimoire. Klaus accidentally reveals that he respects Yuno's abilities. Yuno offers to free Salim if he stays away from Hage. Salim tries to kill Yuno, and a furious Sister Lily knocks him out with her Water Magic. One bandit goes missing and is revealed as Julius in disguise, who took a bandit's place so he could observe Yuno. The Wizard King learns from Salim that his father (a high-ranking politician) is corrupt, and awards the Golden Dawn a star for exposing him. Klaus suspects that Golden Dawn leader William Vangeance knew about Salim's father. Asta learns that Yuno also earned a star on his first mission. A new mission becomes available, and Julius has a good idea which Magic Knights to recruit.
| 14 | 14 | "Dungeon"; Transliteration: "Danjon" (Japanese: 魔宮(ダンジョン)) | Directed by : Yoshizō Tsuda; Storyboarded by : Yasuyuki Honda | Kazuyuki Fudeyasu | Kosei Takahashi & Shunji Akasaka | January 9, 2018 | March 17, 2018 |
An unexplored dungeon appears near the Clover Kingdom's border with the hostile Diamond Kingdom. Julius decides to assign the task to a Magic Knight of claiming the treasure and magical artifacts, and Asta is one of his choices. Asta fulfills the request, and the squad name his anti-bird Nero. Yami sends Noelle (to gain experience) and Luck Voltia, a cheerfully-deranged Black Bull member who seeks out powerful opponents; Nero tags along on Asta's head. Noelle, frightened in the dungeon, clings to Asta. The dungeon is a confusing, nonsensical labyrinth filled with mana (the supernatural energy were magic comes from). Luck and Noelle say that it is full of magical traps, which Asta cuts through to reassure the panicky Noelle. Luck senses other people and, hoping for a good fight, rushes towards the one with the strongest magic. Noelle learns about Yuno from Asta; embarrassed when she realises that she is alone with him, she accidentally triggers a carnivorous-plant trap which tries to eat them. They are saved at the last second by Yuno, who (with Klaus and Mimosa) was also given the quest of exploring the dungeon by the Wizard King.
| 15 | 15 | "The Diamond Mage"; Transliteration: "Daiyamondo no Madōsenshi" (Japanese: ダイヤモンドの魔導戦士) | Directed by : Rokō Ogiwara; Storyboarded by : Yukihiro Matsushita | Kazuyuki Fudeyasu | Makoto Shimojima & Itsuko Takeda | January 16, 2018 | March 24, 2018 |
Vangeance believes it crucial that Yuno become stronger. Klaus accuses Asta of lying about receiving a star and being given a mission by the Wizard King. Noelle is annoyed to see Mimosa, her cousin who has no social filter. Golden Dawn leave to explore the dungeon. Although Asta is proud of how much Yuno has improved, he is determined to reach the treasure room first. Asta and Noelle get lost, but Nero somehow knows the right direction. Yuno angrily warns Klaus about insulting Asta, since he is far stronger than he appears. The Wizard King learns that Diamond Kingdom magicians, led by Lotus Whomalt (a smoke-manipulation magician) have entered the dungeon. Luck is revealed to have defeated the magicians, but is troubled by Lotus' Smoke Magic. He scratches Lotus' face, and becomes increasingly deranged as the fight continues. Lotus reveals that he once duelled with Captain Yami, and received a large scar on his chest. Luck is hit by Lotus' poison gas, and loses control of his body. Golden Dawn reaches the door to the treasure room, but Mimosa is injured by a Crystal Magic wielding magician from the Diamond Kingdom. Luck goes completely mad, and attacks with even-more-powerful Lightning Magic.
| 16 | 16 | "Friends"; Transliteration: "Nakama" (Japanese: 仲間) | Directed by : Daisuke Chiba; Storyboarded by : Hirotsugu Kawasaki | Kazuyuki Fudeyasu | Takaya Sunagawa & Shunji Akasaka | January 23, 2018 | March 31, 2018 |
As children, Asta and Yuno talk about what it means to be a family. As a child, Luck was considered abnormal for constantly smiling; he was abused by his mother until he discovered his Lightning Magic and defeated a noble. His mother then became affectionate toward him, making him promise to keep winning no matter what. Luck attacks Lotus again, but is trapped in a smoke cage. Klaus is almost killed by Mars (the crystal magician), and Luck is almost killed by Lotus. They are saved by Yuno and Asta, who declare that they will protect their new friends. Luck remembers that he could not even stop smiling at his mother's funeral, and insists on fighting alone so she will love him. Asta refuses to let him, and Luck realises that he is not alone anymore. Yuno casts two simultaneous spells to take down Mars. Luck realises that Lotus can sense their magic (and their location) inside his smoke, and formulates a plan using Asta's lack of magic for a surprise attack. Lotus is seriously injured, and Mars survives Yuno's spells by summoning a large crystal sword to defend himself.
| 17 | 17 | "Destroyer"; Transliteration: "Hakaimono" (Japanese: 破壊者) | Tatsuya Yoshihara | Kazuyuki Fudeyasu | Itsuko Takeda | January 30, 2018 | April 8, 2018 (Note: Due to special scheduling, Black Clover moved down to 1:00 a.m. EDT/PDT beginning on the night of April 7–8, 2018, which is effectively Sunday) |
Lotus flees from the Black Bulls. Klaus sees that Mars has crystals embedded in his skin, and remembers that the Diamond Kingdom had tried to produce stronger magicians with human experimentation and fights to the death. Mars, who has a two-colour grimoire, is the result of the experiments. Yuno draws strength from his memories of Asta's determination, and refuses to surrender. When he is about to die, Asta appears and cuts the crystal sword in half. Luck smashes Mars' crystal warriors and Noelle casts her water shield around Mimosa, keeping her safe while she heals. Klaus refuses to believe that Golden Dawn magicians were saved by Black Bulls. With his Anti-Magic and strength, Asta overpowers Mars. Noelle tells Klaus to accept Asta's strength, which is (whether he likes it or not) much greater than that of any noble. Asta is crushed between two crystals and badly injured, while Mars reappears in giant crystal armour. When Klaus sees Asta's muscles, he realises how much he must have trained to fight Mars without magic. Mars flashes back to a girl from his childhood, and tries to destroy Asta. Asta smashes Mars' armour, knocking him unconscious.
| 18 | 18 | "Memories of You"; Transliteration: "Tsuioku no Kimi" (Japanese: 追憶の君) | Directed by : Kenichi Maejima; Storyboarded by : Yūzō Satō | Kazuyuki Fudeyasu | Takaya Sunagawa & Shunji Akasaka | February 6, 2018 | April 15, 2018 |
Mars is restrained with magic. Noelle blushes when she sees Asta half-naked, his clothes torn. The treasure room is filled with magic artifacts. Yuno picks up a scroll with a spell, which reacts to his grimoire before it disappears. Nero tries to direct Asta to a gold seal on the wall, but is ignored. Klaus learns that Mars' grimoire is two grimoires sewn together. It suddenly flies out of his hands and returns to Mars, who can use two types of magic instead of only one (Crystal and Flame). Mars' memories suggest that the girl from his childhood was another test subject; although they were friends, he was forced to kill her in a duel. Noelle is injured, and Asta is blasted through the golden seal into another room. Mars declares his belief that only the strong should survive. Asta awakens to find Nero sitting on top of a second black sword. He seizes it and defends Mimosa and Noelle from Mars; the new sword is smaller and faster. Asta is encouraged by Noelle and the sword absorbs her magic, allowing him to cast a water spell. Despite his armour, Mars is blasted backwards; Asta is impaled by a crystal and collapses.
| 19 | 19 | "Destruction and Salvation"; Transliteration: "Hōkai to Kyūsai" (Japanese: 崩壊と救済) | Directed by : Yūji Tokuno; Storyboarded by : Kazuo Miyake | Kazuyuki Fudeyasu | Kosei Takahashi | February 13, 2018 | April 22, 2018 |
Mars has a flashback about the girl, Fana, who hoped that she would be allowed to go outside. Mars promised her that they would see the world together, but they and all the other children were forced to duel to the death. He killed Fana accidentally, in self-defense. Fana's grimoire was stitched to Mars', giving him Fire and Crystal Magic. He intends to kill Asta and Mimosa. Yuno desperately casts a random spell from his grimoire, and time freezes. A tiny fairy appears and casts a wind spell which hurls Mars into a wall. Yuno realises that the spell on the scroll has appeared in his grimoire. The dungeon begins to collapse, and Lotus is revealed to have taken a large pile of treasure and saved Mars. Mars' dreams reveal that Fana allowed herself to die so he could experience life, and he is deeply affected by his memories. Asta awakens healed and thanks Mimosa, who has a crush on him. Klaus apologises for thinking less of them for being commoners, and begins treating them as equals. Noelle, embarrassed when she realises that her clothes are torn and she is half-naked, punishes Asta for peeking at her.
Eye of the Midnight Sun: Royal Capital Invasion Arc
| 20 | 20 | "Assembly at the Royal Capital"; Transliteration: "Ōto Shūketsu" (Japanese: 王都集結) | Directed by : Matsuo Asami; Storyboarded by : Yukihiro Matsushita | Kazuyuki Fudeyasu | Takaya Sunagawa & Shunji Akasaka | February 20, 2018 | April 29, 2018 |
Asta sleeps for a week, worrying Noelle. They are summoned to Magic Knight headquarters with Yuno, Klaus and Mimosa. Mimosa admits her crush on Asta to Noelle, who experiences a pang of jealousy. They meet the Wizard King Julius Novachrono, who examines Asta and Yuno's grimoires. The elf from Yuno's new spell is Sylph, a wind elemental who serves one master every era. Julius discovers that Asta's swords drain magic from whoever holds them, and Asta can wield them because he has no magic to drain. They attend a knight-promotion ceremony for knights who have earned enough stars; Julius promotes Noelle's older brother and sister, Solid and Nebra Silva, in addition to senior members of the Golden Dawn and Sol Marron of the Blue Roses. Julius leaves Asta, Yuno and their friends alone with the newly-promoted knights, who are arrogant nobles. When Asta hears Noelle's siblings (including her eldest brother and Silver Eagles captain Nozel) mocking her, he impulsively intervenes, and insults them. Solid and Nebra try to punish Asta with their respective Water andMist Magic but he negate their spells. Alecdora Sandler, an Golden Dawn noble then tries to bury him with his Sand Magic, but Asta negates the spell as well and repeats his promise to become the Wizard King.
| 21 | 21 | "Capital Riot"; Transliteration: "Ōto Sōran" (Japanese: 王都騒乱) | Ayataka Tanemura | Kazuyuki Fudeyasu | Kosei Takahashi | February 27, 2018 | May 6, 2018 (Note: Black Clover moved a half-hour (to 1:30 a.m. EDT/PDT, switching time slots with Hunter × Hunter) on the night of May 5–6, 2018) |
Rades Spirito, a Magic Knight who was expelled from his squad, plots revenge against the Clover Kingdom. Noelle's siblings and several other nobles attack Asta, and he fights her brothers Solid and Nebra. Nozel intervenes and freezes everyone with fear, including Asta (whom he intends to punish himself). Fuegoleon Vermillion, Mimosa's cousin and captain of the Crimson Lions, questions the nobles' honour for ganging up on Asta. His brother, Leopold, is impressed by Asta and decides to become his rival. Captains Nozel and Fuegoleon fight a battle of wills. The city is attacked by Rades and his zombie army, who are impervious to injury and kill a number of residents and magicians. Asta rushes to the front lines to protect the commoners Using Golden Dawn member Siren Tium's Stone Magic to make a detailed map of the capital, the nobles split up to protect different parts of the city. Rades is about to kill a little girl when Asta slices through a group of zombies (destroying them) and lunges at him.
| 22 | 22 | "Wild Magic Dance"; Transliteration: "Mahō Ranbu" (Japanese: 魔法乱舞) | Directed by : Rokō Ogiwara; Storyboarded by : Yukihiro Matsushita | Kazuyuki Fudeyasu | Takaya Sunagawa & Shunji Akasaka | March 6, 2018 | May 13, 2018 |
Rades knows who Asta is, but does not know why his zombies were destroyed so easily and summons more. The Silver Eagles, Golden Dawn and Crimson Lions fight them throughout the city, quickly learning that the zombies remain dead only if their bodies are completely destroyed. Asta attacks Rades, who summons No. 4 Jimmy: a more-powerful zombie who shoots Asta in the face with a bleeding-curse-magic bullet which makes him bleed constantly. Asta parries the next bullets so Jimmy fires at the girl instead, forcing Asta to protect her. Although Noelle sees that Asta is in trouble, her siblings' ridicule has destroyed her confidence. Fuegoleon hits Noelle on the head for hesitating (telling her to work to become stronger or remain weak forever), and she realises that this is what Asta does every day. She joins him in battle, casting her water shield around the girl while Leopold burns away the zombies with his Flame Magic (allowing Asta to rush at Jimmy and destroy him). The enraged Rades summons No. 2 Alfred, who attacks Asta with Lightning Magic.
| 23 | 23 | "The Crimson Lion King" (Note: Funimation's English translation for episode 23 was "The King of the Crimson Lions"); Transliteration: "Guren no Shishiō" (Japanese: 紅蓮の獅子王) | Directed by : Yoshizō Tsuda; Storyboarded by : Kazuo Miyake | Kazuyuki Fudeyasu | Itsuko Takeda & Ikuko Matsushita | March 13, 2018 | May 20, 2018 |
The lazy and self-centred king of the Clover Kingdom who is spending the battle with his mistresses in the castle, petulantly asks why the Wizard King is not protecting him. Charmy Papittoson, a young, food-obsessed Black Bull, sneaks into the palace kitchen to meet the royal chef. Since Asta cannot match Alfred's speed, Fuegoleon intervenes and burns Alfred to ashes. Rades mocks Asta's dream of becoming the Wizard King with nothing but Anti-Magic. Fuegoleon is so impressed with Asta that he also decides to become his rival, and takes his place in the fight so he can recover. Rades reveals that he had been on the Purple Orca squad, but was banished from the Clover Kingdom because his Wraith Magic was considered unnatural. Fuegoleon attacks; Rades summons No. 1 Karl, his strongest corpse, and hides behind Karl's magic shield. The more-experienced Fuegoleon use Flame Magic to shoot a fire bolt through the shield's weakest point, destroying Karl and defeating Rades. The city begins to recover; a witch named Catherine flies overhead, suggesting that the battle is not over.
| 24 | 24 | "Blackout"; Transliteration: "Burakkuauto" (Japanese: ブラックアウト) | Directed by : Daisuke Chiba & Seiji Morita; Storyboarded by : Hirotsugu Kawasaki | Kazuyuki Fudeyasu | Takaya Sunagawa & Shunji Akasaka | March 20, 2018 | June 3, 2018 (Note: Adult Swim showed a FLCL marathon on May 26–27, 2018) |
Noelle and Leopold defeat No.3 David, Rades' last zombie. Fuegoleon examines Rades' grimoire and discovers that it has only one page with one spell; necromancy is all he is capable of. Rades has a magic item in his ear which transmits a voice warning him to follow his master's plan. A spell activates in which nearly all the Magic Knights (who had been lured by zombies into teleportation traps) are sent far away. Catherine attacks the city and begins draining magic from every magician, aging them as she becomes younger. Yuno (who escaped the trap) fights her; Catherine reveals that the invasion targeted Fuegoleon Vermillion, who is transported to a different location than the other knights. Yuno is hit by curses, which steal his vision and hearing. Although he almost gives up, he realises that without his sight he is more attuned to the flow of magic. Yuno summons Sylph to manipulate all the city's magic and attack Catherine with a hurricane. Fuegoleon is approached by a magician whom he recognises.
| 25 | 25 | "Adversity"; Transliteration: "Gyakkyō" (Japanese: 逆境) | Directed by : Akira Shimizu; Storyboarded by : Shigehisa Iida | Kazuyuki Fudeyasu | Ikuko Matsushita & Kosei Takahashi | March 27, 2018 | June 10, 2018 |
Catherine, now old and drained of magic, crashes through the wall of the palace kitchen where Charmy is feasting. She tries to drain Charmy's magic, but Charmy (thinking that Catherine wants her food) summons a giant sheep with her Cotton Magic who knocks Catherine through another wall. Catherine's stolen magic returns to her victims, who return to their normal ages. Charmy's meal almost goes through the wall, but it is caught by Yuno (on whom Charmy develops a crush). The king demands battle soon, because the noise is keeping him from napping. Noelle realises that the magician who teleported Fuegoleon must be nearby, and Asta finds him hiding under a pile of zombies. Valtos (the Spatial magician) returns Fuegoleon unconscious with his right arm torn off. Seeing his brother defeated shocks Leopold into near-catatonia. Rades tries to escape through Valtos' portal, but Asta stops him; however, his allies arrive and surround them. Asta (still affected by No. 4 Jimmy's bleeding curse) slashes his own body with his swords, removing the curse and preparing to fight as Rades' allies begin to attack them.
| 26 | 26 | "Wounded Beasts"; Transliteration: "Teoi no Kemono" (Japanese: 手負いの獣) | Directed by : Matsuo Asami; Storyboarded by : Kazuo Miyake | Kazuyuki Fudeyasu | Takaya Sunagawa & Shunji Akasaka | April 3, 2018 | June 17, 2018 |
Asta and Leopold battle the magicians. Noelle uses her shield to prevent further harm to Fuegoleon, who is slowly dying. Asta and Leopold are impaled by wind needles, but are saved by the teleported Magic Knights (who worked together to return to the city). Mimosa begins healing Fuegoleon; Rades and the magicians (calling themselves the Eye of the Midnight Sun) kidnap Asta and flee. Nozel decides not to look for Asta, and Solid and Nebra mock Fuegoleon for his defeat, but Nozel silences them stating that them not having been there makes them a bigger disgrace. The Magic Knights begin rebuilding the city's defences, and Noelle worries about Asta; Rades and the magicians argue about his recklessness. One magician, Sally, wants to dissect Asta for his Anti-Magic. As they reach their hideout, they find Julius waiting for them; he overwhelms them by using his Time Magic to kill two and capture the rest. Asta realises how much he needs to learn before he becomes the Wizard King. Julius is interested in a nearby stone tablet inlaid with several jewels like the one in Saussy, but a mysterious magician appears and blinds everyone with Light Magic.
| 27 | 27 | "Light"; Transliteration: "Hikari" (Japanese: 光) | Directed by : Tazumi Mukaiyama; Storyboarded by : Kazuo Miyake | Kazuyuki Fudeyasu | Itsuko Takeda | April 10, 2018 | June 24, 2018 |
The light magician disappears with the stone tablet after a brief clash with Julius, who returns Asta and his remaining prisoner to the city; Noelle, Klaus, Mimosa and Nero are happy that he is safe. Fuegoleon is missing his jewel necklace, which the Wizard King suspects is part of the stone tablet now possessed by the Eye of the Midnight Sun. Nozel seeks revenge for Fuegoleon's injuries, and Leopold decides to become the Wizard King giving himself the same diamond mark on his forehead as his brother as a sign of his commitment while also forming a friendly rivalry with Asta advising the latter to call him Leo. The Wizard King concludes that one of his Magic Knights must be a traitor. Fuegoleon remains unconscious, and Sally begins experimenting on Asta's blood. The mysterious master is revealed as injured by the Wizard King's Time Magic, with his right arm aged to that of an old man; he has dozens of followers. Asta argues with Yuno, who responds with a wind attack he struggles to nullify. Sylph (visible only to Yuno) has made his magic even more powerful. At the Black Bulls' hideout, Magna has finally earned a star; Asta says that he has been promoted to Junior Magic Knight Third Class for repelling the invasion, outranking Magna and Luck. Charmy was also promoted to Junior Magic Knight First Class for capturing Catherine. After Yami reassures him that Fuegoleon will recover, Asta is asked by lascivious Black Bull member Finral Roulacase to join him at a mixer.
Eye of the Midnight Sun: Encounter Arc
| 28 | 28 | "The One I've Set My Heart On"; Transliteration: "Kokoro ni Kimeta Hito" (Japanese: 心に決めた人) | Ayataka Tanemura | Kazuyuki Fudeyasu | Kosei Takahashi | April 17, 2018 | July 1, 2018 |
Finral attends a mixer with three women, himself, Asta and Luck. As they leave with Finral's portal spell, Noelle (jealous of Asta) secretly follows them. At the mixer, to Noelle's relief, the women are not impressed with Asta, Finral or Luck; Sekke is also at the mixer. Asta is left alone with a young woman, Rebecca Scarlet. After a few awkward minutes, they bond because each has several younger siblings (shocking Noelle). A drunken man insults Rebecca, and Asta throws him across a table (landing on Sekke). Rebecca develops a crush on Asta, but decides to pursue him slowly when she learns that he loves someone else. Noelle mistakenly thinks that Asta has a crush on her. Finral and Luck are rejected by the other two women because of their misunderstood belief (because of Asta's reaction to the drunk) that Black Bulls are too violent.
| 29 | 29 | "Path"; Transliteration: "Michi" (Japanese: 道) | Directed by : Yūji Tokuno; Storyboarded by : Tatsuya Yoshihara | Kazuyuki Fudeyasu | Takaya Sunagawa & Shunji Akasaka | April 24, 2018 | July 8, 2018 |
A recap episode covering the first 28 episodes of the series.
| 30 | 30 | "The Mirror Mage"; Transliteration: "Kagami no Madōshi" (Japanese: 鏡の魔道士) | Directed by : Kenta Katase; Storyboarded by : Shigehisa Iida | Kanichi Katō | Itsuko Takeda & Ikuko Matsushita | May 1, 2018 | July 15, 2018 |
Gauche Adlai, a Black Bull obsessed with his orphaned 10-year-old sister Marie, is happy because it is Marie's birthday. Father Orgi and Sister Lily learn that Asta was promoted to Junior Magic Knight Third Class, and Yuno is promoted to Junior Magic Knight First Class. Asta visits Rebecca's village, angering Noelle. When Gauche arrives at Marie's orphanage, he finds her playing with Asta and Rebecca's siblings. He overreacts, frightening Rebecca's siblings and upsetting Marie (who has a crush on Asta). Gauche tries to kill Asta with his Mirror Magic, Sister Theresa Rapual (a nun who cares for Marie) stops him. He argues with Theresa, who is the reason he can visit Marie only once a month. Rebecca invites Asta to spend the night at her house, and her siblings assume that she will try to seduce him; Noelle faints from jealousy. Gauche again tries to murder Asta in his sleep. Their fight moves outdoors, where Asta realises that the village is snow-covered in midsummer. Rebecca intervenes; two of her siblings (Luca and Marco) and dozens of other village children are missing, led away in a hypnotic trance by Snow Magic user, Neige.
| 31 | 31 | "Pursuit Over the Snow"; Transliteration: "Setsujō no Tsuigeki" (Japanese: 雪上の追跡) | Directed by : Yoshizō Tsuda; Storyboarded by : Yukihiro Matsushita | Kanichi Katō | Sayuri Sakimoto | May 8, 2018 | July 22, 2018 |
Sister Theresa realises that the snow hypnotises children whose magic has not appeared. Gauche tracks Marie into the mountains with Asta and Sister Theresa, leaving Noelle behind to assemble reinforcements. Marie wakes up with the other kidnapped children; Neige, realising that she is awake, calls her a bad friend and hits her. Neige's abusive older brother, Baro, sees that Marco has almost no magic and throws him out into the snow. Noelle contacts Magic Knight Headquarters, and asks Sekke for help. Although Asta sees Marco in the snow, Gauche cares only about Marie. Asta falls off the broom to reach Marco, and Gauche flies on. He awakens Marco from his trance, and Sister Theresa heals him. Baro begins painfully draining magic from the children. Gauche arrives, but he is forced to stop fighting when Baro uses Marie as a shield. Asta frees Marie. Sister Theresa sees that the children are drained, and will never be able to use magic. Baro assumes that Asta is weak without magic, but when Asta learns that Baro stole the children's magic for money he blasts him into the wall.
| 32 | 32 | "Three-Leaf Sprouts"; Transliteration: "Mitsuba no Me" (Japanese: 三つ葉の芽) | Directed by : Toshihiro Maeya; Storyboarded by : Kazuo Miyake | Kanichi Katō | Takaya Sunagawa & Shunji Akasaka | May 15, 2018 | July 29, 2018 |
Sekke flies to the Black Bulls' hideout to get help for Asta and Gauche, but finds most of the Black Bulls drunk; Yami, awakening in a bad mood, thinks that Sekke is a debt collector. Neige is tricked and defeated by Gauche's mirror clone. Sister Theresa restrains Baro, and Asta begins awakening the children from their trances. Baro activates a transmitter. Sister Theresa says that she trained Sister Lily, who told her about Asta and his determination (a daily inspiration). Sally, responding to Baro's signal, appears through a portal. Sekke tells the Black Bulls that Asta and Gauche need help. Yami debates doing it himself (which he does not want to) or sending Gordon and Grey, who are difficult to communicate with. Sally outmanoeuvres and traps Asta and Gauche with her Gel Magic. Sister Theresa burns away the gel and reveals that she was Theresa the Crimson She-Leopard of the Crimson Lions, who trained Fuegoleon when he was a child. Sally injects Baro with a magical substance which transforms him into a mud monster. Gauche flees with Marie, leaving Asta, Sister Theresa and the other children to die.
| 33 | 33 | "To Help Somebody Someday"; Transliteration: "Itsuka Dareka no Tame ni naru" (Japanese: いつか誰かの為になる) | Directed by : Matsuo Asami; Storyboarded by : Toshihiko Masuda | Kanichi Katō | Sayuri Sakimoto | May 22, 2018 | August 5, 2018 |
The mud monster tries to kill Neige, but Asta protects him. Gauche flashes back to his and Marie's childhoods, when a relative killed their noble parents, stole their money and threw Gauche and Marie out into the street. Gauche turned to theft to keep Marie from starving, and was sent to prison; Marie was taken in by Sister Theresa. Gauche changes his mind when Marie tells him that she is proud he became a Magic Knight, leaves her with Marco outside the cave and goes back. He sees that Asta is still fighting the mud monster, attacks Sally and is badly beaten. Asta saves him, and Gauche remembers joining the Bulls; he decides for the first time in his life to support someone else, causing Asta's smaller sword to absorb his magic. A new spell appears in his grimoire; he casts it with the magic mirror in his left eye, creating dozens of Asta mirror clones who defeat the mud monster. Neige vows revenge on Sally, and Asta offers to be his friend. Neige, Gauche and Sister Theresa are attacked by Licht, the Eye of the Midnight Sun leader who, like Yuno, has a four-leaf-clover grimoire.
| 34 | 34 | "Light Magic vs. Dark Magic"; Transliteration: "Hikari Mahō Bāsasu Yami Mahō" (Japanese: 光魔法VS闇魔法) | Directed by : Daisuke Chiba; Storyboarded by : Taisuke Mori | Kanichi Katō | Takaya Sunagawa & Shunji Akasaka | May 29, 2018 | August 12, 2018 |
Licht says that it is his duty to destroy the Clover Kingdom, and is angry that Asta has the five-leaf-clover grimoire. Yami appears through Finral's portal and saves Asta with his sword, a katana from his home country. Licht (who uses Light Magic) decides to duel Yami, who uses Dark Magic. Since Yami is convinced that they met before, Licht says that he comes from a village of powerful magicians who were slaughtered out of jealousy by those who had revered them. Yami counters with his own more-ridiculous tale of how he ended up in the Clover Kingdom, injuring Licht's face when Licht admitted that he had maimed Fuegoleon. Yami orders Asta to fight as well, saying that he countered Licht's attack by sensing his ki (energy emitted by movement). Licht asks Valtos to capture Asta, and Yami orders Asta to use his ki-sensing technique. Asta succeeds on his second try, reflecting Valtos' attack back at him. This infuriates Licht; he causes a cave-in to bury Asta and Yami under the rubble, but they free themselves before Licht and Valtos can leave.
| 35 | 35 | "The Light of Judgment"; Transliteration: "Sabaki no Hikari" (Japanese: 裁きの光) | Directed by : Akira Shimizu; Storyboarded by : Hirotsugu Kawasaki | Kanichi Katō | Sayuri Sakimoto | June 5, 2018 | August 19, 2018 |
Licht criticises the Clover Kingdom's hypocrisy in respecting magical ability but forcing those with powerful magic to live in poor conditions, continuing his fight with Yami while Asta faces Valtos. Despite his new ability to sense ki, Asta is wounded. He throws himself through one of Valtos' portals, reappearing on the other side in front of Valtos (who punches him into a wall). Yami tricks Licht into attacking, and wounds him. Licht praises Yami for being the second man to seriously hurt him; the first was the Wizard King, who incurably aged his right arm. Licht prepares to use a powerful spell to kill Yami and Asta and retrieve the five-leaf-clover grimoire. Finral returns the children to their parents, and Sister Theresa and Gauche are healed. The magician healing Gauche says that it is a miracle he is still alive. Sister Theresa gives Gauche her remaining magic so he can help Asta, who has made him a better man. Neige and Marie also give him their magic. Although Licht invokes his Ray of Divine Punishment spell, Gauche has Finral teleport him to Yami and uses his Full Reflection spell to defeat Licht.
| 36 | 36 | "Three Eyes"; Transliteration: "Mittsu no Me" (Japanese: 三つの眼) | Ayataka Tanemura | Kazuyuki Fudeyasu | Kosei Takahashi | June 12, 2018 | August 26, 2018 |
The children return to the village. Noelle, learning about the fight at the cave, is upset that she was left behind and Asta might still be at risk. At the cave (with Licht knocked out by his own reflected attack), Yami restrains Licht and Valtos while he, Asta and Gauche wait for Finral to regain the strength to teleport them. Licht regains consciousness, recognizing Gauche as a friend (despite Gauche's knowledge that they never met), and is freed by three Eye of the Midnight Sun members who come through a portal. Licht says that the three members are the Third Eye, the Eye of the Midnight Sun's strongest members. The Third Eye represents traits opposed to integrity, hope and love, which the Clover Kingdom pretends to value. Rhya the Disloyal uses Copy Magic to replicate Yami's attack, battling the Black Bull captains; Vetto the Despair's Beast Magic shatters Yami's sword, and Fana the Hateful uses Salamander the fire spirit. The Third Eye are about to kill Yami when their attacks are deflected by Nozel Silva of the Silver Eagles, Charlotte Rosary of the Blue Roses, and Jack the Ripper of the Green Praying Mantises.
| 37 | 37 | "The One With No Magic"; Transliteration: "Maryokunaki Mono" (Japanese: 魔力無き者) | Directed by : Yoshihiro Sugai; Storyboarded by : Yukihiro Matsushita | Kazuyuki Fudeyasu | Itsuko Takeda & Sayuri Sakimoto | June 19, 2018 | September 9, 2018 (Note: Adult Swim showed a My Hero Academia marathon on September 1–2, 2018) |
Neige tells Noelle his motivation to turn himself in: so he and Asta can be friends. Rebecca notices Noelle's concern about Asta. The captains argue, revealing that Jack and Yami dueled in the past and Charlotte is in love with Yami but too stubborn to tell him. Charlotte duels Rhya with her Briar Magic, Jack duels Vetto with his Severing Magic, and Nozel tries to kill Licht with his Mercury Magic but ends up duelling Fana. Licht becomes angrier because Asta owns the five-leaf-clover grimoire and his swords, trying to intercept Yami when Finral teleports him. He and the Third Eye could not sense Asta, who strikes a blow before Yami knocks Licht to the ground. The cave is filled with light, and Asta's sword nullifies a secret stabilizing spell. Licht's personality changes as he accuses Asta of stealing the Demon-Slayer Sword (the larger sword) and Demon-Dweller Sword (the smaller sword) which once belonged to his master. The Third Eye abruptly end their duels to cast a stabilizing spell on Licht before bringing him and Valtos to safety. Asta faints from exhaustion, and Nozel watches him. Licht, Valtos, and Sally recuperate; Rades and the Third Eye argue about what to do because of Asta, and Rhya decides that they must speed up their plans.
Seabed Temple Arc
| 38 | 38 | "The Magic Knights Captain Conference"; Transliteration: "Mahō Kishi-dan Danchō Kaigi" (Japanese: 魔法騎士団団長会議) | Directed by : Tazumi Mukaiyama; Storyboarded by : Kazuo Miyake | Kanichi Katō | Takaya Sunagawa & Shunji Akasaka | June 26, 2018 | September 16, 2018 |
Asta awakens the next day after Klaus and Mimosa heal him, and Neige is taken into custody. Sister Theresa recovers and is pleased that Gauche's attitude has improved, although he is still obsessed with Marie. Rebecca kisses Asta on the cheek to thank him for saving her siblings and let Noelle know that she likes Asta too. After an eating contest at Black Bull headquarters, Yami is summoned by Julius to a meeting of the squad captains and to bring Asta. As Yami meets the other squad captains, the Wizard King's aide Marx Francois escorts Asta to a secret prison where Midnight Sun members Catherine and George are located. Julius, realizing there may be a traitor among the Knights, asks Asta to use his Demon-Slayer Sword to break the spells on the Midnight Sun members (to protect their memories) as Marx proceeds with his inquiry with his Memory Magic. The squad captains bicker as they wait for Julius before they are summoned to the prison, where the Wizard King reveals that there is a traitor among them.
| 39 | 39 | "Three-Leaf Salute"; Transliteration: "Mitsuba no Keirei" (Japanese: 三つ葉の敬礼) | Directed by : Yoshizō Tsuda; Storyboarded by : Jun Kamiya | Kanichi Katō | Sayuri Sakimoto | July 3, 2018 | September 23, 2018 |
The traitor is Purple Orca squad captain Gueldre Poizot, and the other Magic Knight captains point out his criminality. Gueldre uses Transparency Magic to become invisible and flees. Asta tracks him, sensing his ki, and uses his anti-magic to make him visible. Gueldre is then trapped in a magic painting. His memory is examined, revealing his criminal activities. Julius advises the captians to keep Gueldre's actions secret to avoid national panic. All the captains except Yami are excused; one is Rhya in disguise. Meeting with Yami and Asta, Julius reveals that Charlotte and George also revealed information about the stone tablet and the Midnight Sun's goal of collecting the magical stones so they can be reborn in their original forms. One of the four remaining stones is in the Underwater Temple, an area of strong magic which few can reach. He asks Yami to retrieve the stones (his subordinates have the fewest social ties, and the other Magic Knight squads could have traitors among them). Yami recalls he was shunned for being a foreigner until he met Julius for the first time after he received his grimoire. Yami agrees to the mission, and the Black Bull squad prepares for a trip to the beach (including Noelle, who is panicky at having to buy a bikini).
| 40 | 40 | "A Black Beach Story"; Transliteration: "Kuro no Kaigan Monogatari" (Japanese: 黒の海岸物語) | Directed by : Shigeki Awai; Storyboarded by : Taisuke Mori | Kazuyuki Fudeyasu | Kosei Takahashi | July 10, 2018 | September 30, 2018 |
Returning from a mission, Yuno, Klaus and Mimosa hear a scream; it is Noelle, being undressed by Vanessa to try on bikinis. She buys the most expensive bikini, hoping that it will attract Asta. The Black Bulls fly to the beach and begin having fun (accidentally leaving Gordon behind); Noelle is embarrassed at how much skin her bikini reveals, but wants Asta to see her in it. However, every attempt to get Asta to notice her is ruined by the Black Bulls' antics. Sekke, also at the beach, is blasted into the ocean by the Bulls' stampede. Yami arrives and chastises them for loafing, explaining that the temple is on the ocean floor and protected by magic ocean currents strong enough to drown most people. They weaken during the full moon (a week away), and the only Black Bull capable of manipulating water is Noelle. Despite her lack of confidence, Yami orders her to practise controlling her magic enough to break through the current. She begins practicing, turning her water shield into an airtight water bubble which would enable them to breathe underwater. Asta offers to help her train when they hear a voice; down the beach, a young woman is singing.
| 41 | 41 | "The Water Girl Grows Up"; Transliteration: "Mizu no Ko Seichō Monogatari" (Japanese: 水の娘成長物語) | Directed by : Toshihiro Maeya; Storyboarded by : Yukihiro Matsushita | Kazuyuki Fudeyasu | Sayuri Sakimoto | July 17, 2018 | October 7, 2018 |
The girl, Kahano, explains that she is practicing singing, dancing and magic to become an idol. Taking Asta's hand, she diagnoses him with muscle fatigue and uses Song-Recovery Magic to heal him. Noelle is impressed; the magic requires great control, and she is intrigued by a female friend her own age. She describes her difficulties, and Kahano suggests that she cast her spells while summoning a pleasant memory; Noelle, however, has none. She practices and, on the night before the full moon, Asta suggests that she cast the spell randomly. The spell engulfs her, and she is overcome by feelings of failure and misery. Noellee sees the Bulls shouting encouragement, however, and is overwhelmed by pleasant memories of her friends (especially Asta). A new spell appears in her grimoire (the Sea Dragon's Cradle), and her water shield is transformed into an airtight water bubble. As the Bulls celebrate, Noelle realises that Kahano has disappeared. Yami watches from a distance, and is impressed with her. Kahano says to herself that she looks forward to seeing Noelle in the Underwater Temple, and jumps into the sea.
| 42 | 42 | "The Underwater Temple"; Transliteration: "Kaitei Shinden" (Japanese: 海底神殿) | Directed by : Matsuo Asami; Storyboarded by : Jun Kamiya | Kanichi Katō | Takaya Sunagawa & Shunji Akasaka | July 24, 2018 | October 14, 2018 |
The Bulls set off for the Underwater Temple, barely passing the magic currents with Noelle's cradle. They reach the temple, and find it surrounded by a magic barrier of spinning whirlpools. Yami throws Asta at the whirlpools, although Asta cannot swim; he cuts through them with his sword, allowing the cradle to enter. Inside and able to breathe, the Black Bulls find the Temple: a large city grown from glowing coral. Unseen, Nero (hiding in Asta's robe) flies ahead of them. They meet friendly temple residents, who ask them many questions about the surface and say that they have not had a visitor in over 10 years. Yami asks to see the person in charge, and they are brought to the high priest and easily defeat a fish monster. The high priest, the eccentric Gifso, says that the monster was a prank to frighten visitors. Gifso (who knows they want the magic stone) tells them that they must win a fight between the Black Bulls and the temple's warrior magicians. Gifso use hi Game Magic to teleport Black Bulls throughout the temple and separated, forcing each to fight a warrior magician alone. Asta, confronted by an octopus-headed magician, prepares to fight.
| 43 | 43 | "Temple Battle Royale"; Transliteration: "Shinden Batoru Rowaiyaru" (Japanese: 神殿バトルロワイヤル) | Ayataka Tanemura | Kanichi Katō | Kosei Takahashi | July 31, 2018 | October 21, 2018 |
Yami watches the fight with Gifso. Asta, Luck, Magna and Gauche quickly defeat their opponents, shocking Gifso and reducing the magicians to five. Gifso says that his three strongest magicians will surely win. Charmy is put to sleep by her opponent's Song Magic, reducing the Black Bulls to eight. Asta encounters Kiato, who fights with swords and reveals that the high priest is his grandfather; if he wins, he can leave the temple and become a dancer. Noelle encounters Kahano, the song magician, whose dream of becoming an idol also depends on defeating the Bulls; however, she insists on fighting fairly. Noelle protects herself with her water shield, but her attacks miss; Kahano tells her that she had perfect control all along, but misses because she wants to avoid hurting people. Noelle realises that she is right. Asta struggles to match Kiato's graceful dueling style. Vanessa defeats her opponent, leaving four magicians to the Black Bulls' eight. The magician facing Luck and Magna is Gio, the high priest's son, who he is crushed beneath a powerful spell as Vetto the Despair arrives with four Midnight Sun magicians to steal the magic stone.
| 44 | 44 | "The Pointlessly Direct Fireball and the Wild Lightning"; Transliteration: "Guchokuna Kakyū to Honpōna Inazuma" (Japanese: 愚直な火球と奔放な稲光) | Directed by : Akira Shimizu; Storyboarded by : Hirotsugu Kawasaki | Kazuyuki Fudeyasu | Sayuri Sakimoto | August 7, 2018 | October 28, 2018 |
Revealed as defeating a team of magicians before traveling to the Underwater Temple, Vetto fights Gio, Magna and Luck. When Gifso sees his son defeated, he tells Yami that his game spell has been cast; no outsider can interfere before they realize that they have been sealed in another dimension by Midnight Sun magician Abari. Yami contacts the Black Bulls and temple magicians, explaining that they must defeat Vetto; Gifso changes the rules, so the Bulls and temple magicians can have any wish if they defeat Vetto. Luck and Vetto duel at an incredible speed; Magna, who cannot keep up, attacks Vetto with fireballs. Luck remembers meeting Magna, and knowing instinctively that he was dangerous. He would annoy Magna into expressing his dangerous side, growing stronger and becoming Luck's first real friend. As Asta and Kiato race toward the battle, Asta asks why it was so hard to follow Kiato's ki; Kiato says that his Dance Magic puts him in a trance. His body moves without conscious thought, making his movements unpredictable even to one who can sense ki. Despite critical injuries, Luck and Magna hit Vetto with a combined Flame Lightning Exploding Cannon spell.
| 45 | 45 | "The Guy Who Doesn't Know When to Quit"; Transliteration: "Akirame no Warui Otoko" (Japanese: 諦めの悪い男) | Directed by : Seung Deok Kim; Storyboarded by : Kazuo Miyake | Kanichi Katō | Sayuri Sakimoto | August 14, 2018 | November 4, 2018 |
Vetto blocks Luck and Magna's attack, and they collapse. Asta blocks his attempt to kill them, slashes his stomach, and fights him with Kiato. Vanessa and Gauche encounter Midnight Sun magicians, and Gauche's opponent has a magic chain capable of destroying his mirrors. Gauche, hiding, encounters a crab previously seen in the caves. He tricks the magician into thinking that he summoned his mirror clone, and defeats him. The fake clone is Grey (using Transformation Magic), who leads Gauche back to Charmy. They are trapped by another Midnight Sun magician, who begins draining their magic. Gauche remembers learning from Asta that friends protect each other. Grey transforms a boulder into a hunk of meat, and Gauche shouts at Charmy that the magician is stealing her dinner. The food-obsessed Charmy awakens from her enchanted sleep, and summons a giant sheep who crushes the magician. Out of magic, Grey is revealed as a shy, nervous young woman embarrassed when others see her true self. Vetto overpowers Asta; angry that he is using the Anti-Magic swords, he nearly breaks Asta's arm when Noelle and Kahono arrive.
| 46 | 46 | "Awakening"; Transliteration: "Kakusei" (Japanese: 覚醒) | Directed by : Yoshizō Tsuda; Storyboarded by : Shigehisa Iida | Kazuyuki Fudeyasu | Kosei Takahashi | August 21, 2018 | November 11, 2018 |
Kahano and Kiato combine their Song and Dance magic to overwhelm Vetto before he severs Kiato's leg and crushes Kahono's throat. Defeating Gifso's sea monsters, Vetto remembers that his group had dreams before the humans showed them despair. Despite Noelle's reluctance, Kahono telepathically reassures her that she is strong enough to protect what is precious to her. Noelle gains full control of her power and casts another new spell, Sea Dragon's Roar (a giant water serpent which overpowers Vetto, cutting off his arm). Yami, surprised, realises that Noelle is an attacking magician. When Vetto remembers meeting Licht before he attended a wedding where their people were killed, a third eye opens in the centre of his forehead. It enhances his Mythical-Beast magic, regrowing his severed arm. Yami, realising that the Midnight Sun are more than a terrorist organization, tells Noelle to run. Out of magic and overpowered, she is rescued by Asta.
| 47 | 47 | "The Only Weapon"; Transliteration: "Yuiitsu no Buki" (Japanese: 唯一の武器) | Directed by : Tazumi Mukaiyama; Storyboarded by : Yukihiro Matsushita | Kazuyuki Fudeyasu | Itsuko Takeda & Sayuri Sakimoto | August 28, 2018 | November 25, 2018 (Note: Adult Swim showed an Attack on Titan marathon on November 17–18, 2018) |
When she sees Vetto's transformation, Noelle remembers her grandmother's tale about a race of evil beings whose leader was defeated by the first Wizard King. Deciding to join the fight, Yami tries to escape from the dimension bubble; Vanessa uses Thread Magic to defeat a Midnight Sun member. Finral decides to run away, but remains after hearing Asta shout about never giving up. Vetto tries to kill Luck, Magna, Kahono, Kiato and Gio, but Vanessa intervenes and traps him with her strings. He breaks free and attacks, but Finral reveals himself and sends the spell through his portals back to Vetto. Directed by Vanessa, Noelle keeps Luck, Magna, Kahono, Kiato and Gio safe inside her water shield. Although Finral is still terrified, Vanessa encourages him with a promised embrace if they win and helps Asta grip his sword by wrapping his hand with strings. As the battle begins, Vetto finds his spells redirected by Finral's portals (so he cannot fight long-range) and Asta wounds his cheek.
| 48 | 48 | "Despair vs. Hope"; Transliteration: "Zetsubō Bāsasu Kibō" (Japanese: 絶望VS希望) | Directed by : Daisuke Chiba; Storyboarded by : Jun Kamiya | Kanichi Katō | N/A | September 4, 2018 | December 2, 2018 |
Realising that wounds from Anti-Magic swords are immune to his healing magic, Vetto is no match for Asta (who uses Finral's portals and Vanessa's strings to maneuver around the battlefield, cutting Vetto's shoulder). Gauche, Grey and Charmy wait for their magic to recharge. Vetto begins to anticipate Asta's moves, and cuts his ribs. Yami warns Asta that unless he fights smarter and faster, Vetto's next blow will kill him. Vanessa thinks back to her life in the Forest of Witchs where she was locked in a cage before escaping and joined the Black Bulls. Finral also thinks back to his youth, were he was considered a disgrace by his family for being unable to use his Spatial Magic offensively, and was eventually passed over as heir of the household in favor of his younger brother Langris, who was doted on for his skill. Although Finral and Vanessa begin to lose their magic, they are joined by the recharged Gauche, Grey and Charmy. Gauche fires mirror lasers at Vetto; Charmy uses her Giant Sheep Chef to create a smokescreen, and Grey uses Transformation Magic to turn puffs of the smoke into copies of Asta. Amidst the confusion, Asta reveals himself and stabs Vetto in the chest.
| 49 | 49 | "Beyond Limits"; Transliteration: "Genkai no Saki" (Japanese: 限界の先) | Directed by : Toshihiro Maeya; Storyboarded by : Hirotsugu Kawasaki & Tatsuya Yoshihara | Kanichi Katō | Takaya Sunagawa & Shunji Akasaka | September 11, 2018 | December 9, 2018 |
Vetto reveals that he attacked Asta to injure his arms and seize the Demon-Dweller Sword. Refusing to lose, Asta retrieves the Demon-Slayer Sword and described his promise to Yuno to never give up (as Vetto never gave up against him). Vetto, realising too late that he forgot the Demon-Dweller Sword, discovers that he can no longer track his opponent's movements. Seeing Asta's demonic aura, he thinks his opponent is inhuman before his defeat with a powerful blow. As Yami wonders about Asta's demonic power, the Black Bulls' celebration is short-lived; Vetto, awakening up from a dream of himself and Licht as children, decides to use his remaining magic to self-destruct and destroy the Underwater Temple. This forces Yami to break Abari's barrier with his space-cutting Dark Cloaked Dimension Slash – defeating the Midnight Sun magician, reaching his team and using his spell again to kill Vetto.
| 50 | 50 | "End of the Battle, End of Despair"; Transliteration: "Tatakai no Hate - Zetsubō no Owari" (Japanese: 戦いの果て 絶望の終わり) | Directed by : Matsuo Asami; Storyboarded by : Masayuki Takahashi | Kazuyuki Fudeyasu | Sayuri Sakimoto | September 18, 2018 | December 16, 2018 |
After Vetto's death, Gifso thanks the Black Bulls and offers them a reward for winning his game. When Yami asks for the magic stone, Gifso says that he does not know anything about it. Nero arrives with the stone, however, and Gifso gladly gives it to the Bulls. The remaining Midnight Sun members begin planning to retrieve the stone. The Black Bulls are embarrassed when the entire Underwater Temple gathers outside their hospital room to thank them; this is unprecedented, since they are the worst squad in the kingdom. Noelle apologises to Kahono and Kiato for the loss of her voice and his leg, but Kahono promises that she will find a way to sing again. Kiato falls in love with Noelle when she smiles, and is determined to dance again to impress her. Nero shows Asta Yami's makeshift shrine to Vetto. Asta tells Yami that although he cannot forgive the Midnight Sun, he sympathises with them; Yami tells him to continue achieving his dreams. As the Black Bulls go home with Vetto's subordinates through Finral's portal, Kahono struggles to sing a song in their honour and is joined by the entire Underwater Temple.
Witches' Forest Arc
| 51 | 51 | "Proof of Rightness"; Transliteration: "Tadashi-sa no Shōmei" (Japanese: 正しさの証明) | Directed by : Yūsuke Onoda & Yoshihiro Sugai; Storyboarded by : Yukihiro Matsushita | Kazuyuki Fudeyasu | N/A | September 25, 2018 | January 6, 2019 (Note: Adult Swim showed a Dragon Ball Super marathon on December 22–23, 2018 and a Boruto: Naruto Next Generations marathon on December 29–30, 2018) |
The Black Bulls realise that they left Gordon behind. Although they think he is angry, he is depressed because he cannot make himself understood. Yami, Charmy and Asta present Julius with the stone, Vetto's body and the captured Midnight Sun magicians. Marx tells Julius that Diamond Kingdom magicians are attacking Kiten, a fortress on the Clover Kingdom's border with the Diamond Kingdom. The Wizard King realizes the seriousness of the situation, since the army is led by three of the kingdom's Eight Shining Generals (the Diamond Kingdom's equivalent to a magic knight squad captain): Ragus, Broccos and Yagos. The knights in Kiten are overwhelmed when Ragos breaks through their barrier with lightning arrows. Yagos plans an attack strategy and Broccos charges wildly, breaking through the city wall with a magic boar. The Golden Dawn squad, including Yuno, arrive to defend Kiten. Broccos charges at Yuno, but his boar is destroyed by Wind Magic. Yami offers to go to Kiten through Finral's portal to see Golden Dawn captain William Vangeance. He reconsiders Charmy's offer to protect Asta, although she wants to see Yuno. In Kiten, Vangeance notes how strong Yuno has become and decides to join the battle.
| 52 | 52 | "Whoever's Strongest Wins"; Transliteration: "Tsuyoi Hōga Katsu" (Japanese: 強い方が勝つ) | Directed by : Tenpei Mishio; Storyboarded by : Yukihiro Matsushita & Masayuki Takahashi | Momoko Murakami | Takaya Sunagawa & Shunji Akasaka | October 2, 2018 | January 13, 2019 |
Broccos prepares to fight Yuno, but Ragus insists on fighting instead. Yuno's wind arrows, made more powerful by Bell's (Yuno's nickname for Sylph) magic, destroy Ragus' lightning arrows. Yagos encases himself in a giant snail made of mucus and begins draining magic from injured mages. The Golden Dawn's vice-captain Langris Vaude, Finral's younger brother who also uses Spatial Magic, teleports away part of Yagos' snail along with his right arm. Vangeance meanwhile uses his World Tree Magic to create a giant tree that ensnares a large nimber of Diamond mages. Yami orders Charmy, Asta and Finral to help the citizens while he finds Vangeance. Ragus and Yuno begin dueling, but Yuno is far superior in skill and power and impales Ragus with a wind trident, defeating him. Yuno meets with Asta and surprises Finral by greeting Asta warmly, something Finral cannot understand as his rivalry with his brother was far from friendly. Mimosa offers to heal Asta's broken arms, but he insists Mimosa help everyone else first. Broccos attempts to kill Vangeance but is defeated instantly. Lotus attempts to sneak up on Vangeance hidden inside his smoke but is prevented from attacking by Yami. Rather than fight, Lotus retrieves Broccos and retreats. Yami confronts Vangeance and asks him to remove his mask.
| 53 | 53 | "Behind the Mask"; Transliteration: "Kamen no Oku" (Japanese: 仮面の奥) | Directed by : Yoshizō Tsuda; Storyboarded by : Ichizō Kobayashi | Kazuyuki Fudeyasu | Itsuko Takeda & Sayuri Sakimoto | October 9, 2018 | January 20, 2019 |
Finral meets his younger brother Langris. When Langris mocks Finral, Asta reveals his role in defeating Vetto. Langris is attacked by Yagos using civilians as a human shield. Langris, who does not care about civilians, prepares to attack until Asta stops him. Using Charmy's cotton sheep as a springboard, Asta lunges at Yagos and uses Finral's portals to maneuver while holding his sword in his teeth to spare his arms. First, he nullifies Yagos' mucus, freeing the hostages, and then knocks Yagos into a wall. Finral finally confronts his younger brother and promises the Black Bulls will surpass the Golden Dawn. Vangeance eventually agrees to remove his mask as he knows Yami believes he is Licht even though he and the Midnight Sun leader use different types of magic. Removing his mask reveals that it conceals a birthmark covering the top half of his face. In a flashback, Vangeanc, a nobleman's illegitimate child. is frequently abused by his foster mother because of his face. Eventually, Julius creates his mask while urging him to join the Magic Knights. In the present, Yami accepts that Vangeance is not Licht and leaves. Yuno clashes with Langris over his attitude towards Asta and professes his willingness to surpass Langris by becoming captain of the Golden Dawn. The Wizard King believes the invasion was a ruse to allow the Diamond Kingdom to search for something. Lotus reports to his superior, who's unconcered with the older generals' defeat, confident in the strength of the newer generation of Shining Generals, with Mars being one of them.
| 54 | 54 | "Never Again"; Transliteration: "Mōnidoto" (Japanese: もう二度と) | Ayataka Tanemura | Momoko Murakami | Kosei Takahashi | October 16, 2018 | January 27, 2019 |
Yami drags Asta to Owen, a Healer, who gives him bad news, overheard by Finral. Yami reveals the Bulls have earned so many stars they have gone from negative 30 stars to zero stars, and they have a party. When Asta says he is tired, Noelle and the others become suspicious as he has never said he was tired before. Finral reveals that Vetto infected Asta's arms with Ancient Curse Magic, which crushed his bones. The curse prevents them healing and Owen was unable to help. Asta is crippled and can never use his arms again. As the Black Bulls search for Asta to make him feel better they find him shouting that he will train until he can fight without his arms. All the Black Bulls are proud of him. Meanwhile, Vanessa thinks that she might know of a magic that can save his arms. The next morning Asta realizes that most of the Black Bulls left secretly to search for ways to heal him: Luck and Magna search a dungeon in the Forsaken Realm, Gauche and Gordon are researching curses in the King's Library, Charmy and Grey are gathering exotic potion ingredients in the wild, and Vanessa disappears. Noelle has Finral take her to the home of a red-haired man, but quickly attacks him when she sees him naked.
| 55 | 55 | "The Man Named Fanzell"; Transliteration: "Fanzeru to Yū otoko" (Japanese: ファンゼルという男) | Directed by : Daisuke Chiba & Shigeki Awai; Storyboarded by : Sōichi Shimada | Kazuyuki Fudeyasu | Sayuri Sakimoto | October 23, 2018 | February 3, 2019 |
The man reveals himself as a swordsman named Fanzell Kruger. In a flashback, Asta sees him being chased by a giant boar during his training and rescues him. Fanzell trains Asta in swordsmanship while he is waiting for a friend to arrive. He ranks him among the top two students. Eventually, Mariella, one of Fanzell's students, arrives at his home. Having searched for Fanzell's missing fiancé, Dominante Code, Mariella suggests that she is presumed dead. Fanzell recalls he and Dominante were Diamond Kingdom warriors but were separated by assassins after they defected from the army, so Fanzell hid while Mariella searched for Dominante. That evening, Mariella lures Fanzell into a trap and tells him that since his other students were killed, Mariella joined the Diamond Kingdom as an assassin. Mariella plans to bring him back so he can help with the experiments that created Mars. However, Asta helps Fanzell force the assassins to retreat, which gives him a new reason to live and continue searching for Dominante. With Asta's training complete, he and Fanzell go their separate ways.
| 56 | 56 | "The Man Named Fanzell, Continued"; Transliteration: "Zoku Fanzeru to Yū otoko" (Japanese: 続・ファンゼルという男) | Directed by : Tazumi Mukaiyama; Storyboarded by : Amenoichi | Kanichi Katō | Itsuko Takeda & Sayuri Sakimoto | October 30, 2018 | February 10, 2019 |
In another flashback, Fanzell arrives at the Black Bulls headquarters, where Noelle confirms that the wand in her possession was crafted by Dominante proving that she is still alive. However, the headquarters are attacked by Diamond Kingdom assassins led by Mariella and Galleo, their commander. The Black Bulls effortlessly defeat Galleo and the assassins. Fanzell, Asta and Noelle are teleported by Finral to the Black Market where they find Dominante, who punishes Fanzell for taking so long to find her. Mariella arrives and reveals that meeting Asta made her realise she had also grown tired of working for the Diamond Kingdom. She had the assassins attack the Black Bulls, knowing they would defeat them. She offers to be imprisoned for her crimes, but they are interrupted by Galleo who escaped the Black Bulls and heard everything Mariella said. He attempts to kill her but is easily defeated by Asta and Fanzell. Fanzell, Dominante, and Mariella become friends again and decide to leave together, saying goodbye to the Black Bulls. In the present, Noelle and Finral tell Fanzell, Dominante, and Mariella about Asta's arms. Dominante tells them the only magic she knows of that might help belongs to the Witch Queen. Meanwhile, in the Forest of Witches, Vanessa enters the Queen's manor.
| 57 | 57 | "Infiltration"; Transliteration: "Sen'nyū" (Japanese: 潜入) | Directed by : Toshihiro Maeya; Storyboarded by : Masayuki Takahashi | Kanichi Katō | Itsuko Takeda & Sayuri Sakimoto | November 6, 2018 | February 17, 2019 |
Dominante explains the Forest of Witches is a country whose inhabitants are all women possessing powerful magic. She warns that any woman who leaves the forest like she and Vanessa are considered criminals. Noelle, Dominante, Finral, Fanzell, and Mariella retrieve Asta and travel to the forest. Meanwhile, the Witch Queen is disappointed that Vanessa failed to control destiny through her Thread Magic. Vanessa offers to return to the Forest in return for the spell to heal Asta but is easily knocked out. Dominante explains the Witch Queen can sense anyone entering the forest, so she gives everybody invisibility cloaks to prevent the Queen from sensing them. Fanzell loses his cloak, inadvertently causing the mages to be discovered. Left with no choice, the mages flee to the Queen's manor, where Asta tries rescuing Vanessa but the Queen thwarts him, revealing that the Witches are her daughters, including Vanessa. Using a magic crystal that can see the future, the Queen tells the group of their impending deaths, but she realizes that the Eye of the Midnight Sun, led by Fana the Hatred, has already invaded the forest to exact revenge on the Black Bulls for injuring Licht and killing Vetto.
| 58 | 58 | "Battlefield Decision"; Transliteration: "Senjō no Ketsudan" (Japanese: 戦場の決断) | Directed by : Matsuo Asami; Storyboarded by : Yukihiro Matsushita | Kanichi Katō | Sayuri Sakimoto | November 13, 2018 | February 24, 2019 |
Using her Salamander, Fana burns the forest while the Witch Queen observes that the Diamond Kingdom army, including Mars and Ladros of the Eight Shining Generals, is also invading it. Asta refuses the Queen's offer, as it would cost Vanessa her freedom. Using the Demon-Dweller Sword, Asta attempts to heal himself, but his Anti-Magic fails to remove the curse. He still refuses to accept his fate, which reminds Vanessa of her first meeting with Yami. Offered by Noelle to heal Asta's arms in exchange for the Black Bulls defeating the invaders, the Queen accepts this and, using her Blood Magic, heals Asta. Unknown to the seven, she secretly plans to steal both Vanessa and Asta's Anti-Magic for herself. Fanzell intends to fight the Diamond Kingdom as he must defeat Mars and Ladross. Fana destroys the giant Golem guarding the Forest. Shidan, her subordinate, captures the witches to use as slaves, but Asta easily defeats Shidan and his soldiers. Fana tries killing Asta to avenge Vetto, but Asta reflects Salamander's fireball back at her. Asta, Vanessa and Finral join forces to fight Fana.
| 59 | 59 | "Flames of Hatred"; Transliteration: "Zōo no Honō" (Japanese: 憎悪の炎) | Directed by : Rokō Ogiwara; Storyboarded by : Sōichi Shimada | Momoko Murakami | Shirō Shibata | November 20, 2018 | March 3, 2019 |
Vanessa doubts they can win as Salamander is one of the Four Great Spirits. Unable to understand Fana's hatred and Vetto's despair, Asta insists on talking instead of fighting. In a flashback, a human mage, who desires peace between elves and humans with Licht, marries a human woman who conceives his half-elven child. The elves assume the mage has betrayed them when they were massacred by humans. In the present, Fana summons a third eye on her forehead, causing Salamander to grow much larger and starts using Crystal Magic. Her fire grows so hot neither Vanessa's strings nor Finral’s portal can get near her. With her shield temporarily down, Noelle extinguishes Salamander's flames with her Sea Dragon's Roar spell. Asta realises Fana's magic is familiar and asks about her relationship with Mars, but is unsuccessful. Vanessa and Finral use their magic to have Asta stab Salamander in the chest.
| 60 | 60 | "Defectors' Atonement"; Transliteration: "Rihan-sha no Shokuzai" (Japanese: 離反者の贖罪) | Directed by : Akira Shimizu; Storyboarded by : Amenoichi | Momoko Murakami | Itsuko Takeda, Sayuri Sakimoto & Hirokimi Shiratori | November 27, 2018 | March 10, 2019 |
Fanzell confronts Mars and Ladros, who reveal they seek the Witch Queen to cure the Diamond King of a terminal illness. Fanzell, Mariella and Dominante join forces with the other mages to fight the Diamond army. Fanzell tries fighting Ladros, but Ladros reveals his surgically modified body can absorb other people's magic. He uses Fanzell's Wind Magic to destroy part of the forest, killing many witches and even his own soldiers. Fanzell is injured keeping Dominante safe. Ladros rejects Fanzell's belief that magic should be used to protect others and tries killing Dominante; however, she is rescued by Mars, who has changed since his earlier defeat to Asta and has decided to continue to follow Fanzell's teachings. Mariella injures Ladros, but he absorbs her Ice Magic and Mars' Crystal Magic. Mars explains they can defeat Ladros with Anti-Magic. He and Fanzell throw Ladros in Asta's direction. Asta unsuccessfully pleads with Fana to surrender so she can return to her family and friends.
| 61 | 61 | "The Promised World"; Transliteration: "Yakusoku no Sekai" (Japanese: 約束の世界) | Ayataka Tanemura | Kazuyuki Fudeyasu | Kosei Takahashi | December 4, 2018 | March 17, 2019 |
As Fanzell and Mars fly towards Asta, he deflects Fana's fireball at Ladros, who attempts to absorb it but is easily defeated. Mars immediately realises that Fana is his childhood friend, who was seemingly killed as part of the Diamond Kingdom's human experiments. Fana's memories of Mars cause her to activate a self-destruct spell. Mars willingly lets himself be injured as penance for killing Fana, until Asta tells him if Fana really is his childhood friend he should save her instead of letting himself be killed. Mars begins to continuously use Flame-Healing Magic to instantly heal their burns caused by Fana. Together, they reach Fana and Asta nullifies the self-destruct spell causing Salamander to disappear. Mars then embraces Fana before she can attack again, apologizing for almost killing her and leaving her behind. This causes Fana's childhood memories of Mars to overlap her memories of the elven village, resulting in the third eye disappearing. They are finally happily reunited.
| 62 | 62 | "Those Who Boost Each Other Up" (Note: Funimation's English translation for episode 62 was "Bettering One Another"); Transliteration: "Takame Au Sonzai" (Japanese: 高め合う存在) | Directed by : Yoshizō Tsuda; Storyboarded by : Yukihiro Matsushita | Momoko Murakami | Sayuri Sakimoto | December 11, 2018 | March 24, 2019 |
Following Fana's defeat, she reveals that she survived her gambit of having Mars kill her for his freedom. She was eventually found by Licht after being discarded by the Diamond Kingdom, revealing that her body was controlled by another who was also named Fana. When the group is attacked by Ladros, Fana finds that magic has also disappeared with the possessing spirit. Asta engages in a duel with Ladros which results in Asta draining his magic by stabbing his Demon-Dweller Sword through Ladros's chest. Asta refuses to let Ladros mock his friends, as they all support each other and make each other stronger. He attempts to defeat Ladros but he captures Fana to force Salamander to reappear, absorbing the spirit to increase his strength as he subjects Asta to a barrage of fireballs. Meanwhile, the Witch Queen uses her magic to awaken Asta's true self with his right eye turning red.
| 63 | 63 | "Not in the Slightest"; Transliteration: "Nandemonai" (Japanese: 何でも無い) | Tatsuya Yoshihara | Momoko Murakami | Itsuko Takeda & Shirō Shibata | December 18, 2018 | March 31, 2019 |
In a dream, Asta is confronted by the devil in his grimoire, wishing to possess his body but Asta resists its control. Asta awakens with the right arm and right-side of his hair turning black with Anti-Magic, while also gaining a demonic horn and wing. He and Ladros duel fiercely while the Witch Queen reveals Asta normally only releases a little Anti-Magic at a time. With her blood inside him, however, the Anti-Magic pours out all at once. The Queen realizes that her theroy of Asta is able to wield the Anti-Magic sword because he's of a certain bloodline was wrong, stating he's nothing special, yet admitting that is what makes him special. With a new move, Black Meteorite, Asta destroys Ladros' implanted magic stones to defeat him. When Asta reveals his intentions to help the injured and demands Ladros heal quickly so he can apologize to everyone for his actions, Ladros accepts defeat. With the Anti-Magic disappeared, Asta decides he wants to master the devil's power. However, the Witch Queen seizes control of Asta's body with her Blood Control technique, since she cannot use his Anti-Magic sword herself, and traps everyone else. To test her new power, she decides to have Asta kill everyone.
| 64 | 64 | "The Red Thread of Fate"; Transliteration: "Unmei no Akai Ito" (Japanese: 運命の赤い糸) | Directed by : Fumio Maezono; Storyboarded by : Amenoichi | Kazuyuki Fudeyasu | Hirokimi Shiratori | December 25, 2018 | April 7, 2019 |
Asta tries killing Noelle, but he instinctively stops. Meanwhile, the Queen tells Vanessa that see foresaw her escape and eventual return to the forest, before claiming Vanessa belongs to her as they're family. Enraged, Vanessa remembers how the Queen locked her in a cage her entire childhood to make learn a spell that can contal fate until Yami inadvertently broke it and encourage Venessa to decide her own fate. Remembering her past life with the Black Bulls, Vanessa finally awakens her Grimoire's most powerful Thread Magic, a red cat formed from the Red Thread of Fate, which has the power to alter destiny itself. The cat touches Asta just as he's about to decapitate Noelle, but the cat's power averts the outcome, and Noelle survives. The Queen tries killing both Finral and the cat, to no effect, as the cat causes Asta to strike himself with his own sword, freeing him from the Queen's control. Hoping to steal Vanessa's ability to alter fate for herself, the Queen attempts to kill her, but is easily defeated. Vanessa explains that the cat will only protect her and those she considers family; therefore the Queen can never control fate.
| 65 | 65 | "I'm Home"; Transliteration: "Tadaima" (Japanese: ただいま) | Directed by : Toshihiro Maeya; Storyboarded by : Yukihiro Matsushita | Momoko Murakami | Sayuri Sakimoto | January 8, 2019 | April 14, 2019 |
Having realized that she originally wanted to help Vanessa to spread happiness towards others with her Thread Magic, but lost sight of it due to her obsession with perfection, the Queen accepts defeat and heals everyone. In the aftermath, the Queen gives her earring to Asta, explaining that it is actually a magic stone originally belonging to Elves who were massacred by humans 500 years ago. The Third Eye that the Midnight Sun possess is forbidden magic only Elves can perform, as was the Great Demon defeated by the first Wizard King, which was summoned by the Elves' leader. She further reveals Asta's Anti-Magic swords are the remnants of the swords wielded by the Elves' leader. Mars returns to the Diamond Kingdom intending to use the Witch Queen's Blood Control to control the king, shut down the military's experiments and make the Diamond Kingdom peaceful, with Ladros deciding to help him. Fana decides to stay with Fanzell, Dominate and Meriella, promising to reunite with Mars once he succeeds. The Black Bulls return to their headquarters and give the stone to Yami. They also find that the other Black Bulls have returned from their various quests to find the cure for Asta's arms. Luck and Magna have grown far more powerful by defeating a dungeon; Gordon and Gauche have become nerds after spending too long in the King's Library; and Charmy and Grey have become infested with mushroom spores from the forests. Asthe Black Bulls celebrate their victory, Vanessa reflects on how they became her family.
Royal Knights Arc
| 66 | 66 | "The Eye of the Midnight Sun's Secret" (Note: Funimation's English translation for episode 66 was "The Secret of the Eye of the Midnight Sun"); Transliteration: "Byakuya no Magan no Himitsu" (Japanese: 白夜の魔眼のひみつ) | Directed by : Tazumi Mukaiyama; Storyboarded by : Ayataka Tanemura | Kazuyuki Fudeyasu | Sayuri Sakimoto & Itsuko Takeda | January 15, 2019 | April 21, 2019 |
A recap episode detailing the activities of the Eye of the Midnight Sun is narrated by Klaus to Yuno and Mimosa as part of a study session. It covers the attack on the Royal Capital, the battle at the cave at Nean, and the battle at the Underwater Temple. It emphasizes that the Eye of the Midnight Sun is after the magic stones, which is why they attacked Fuegoleon. At the end, Yami gives the magic stone retrieved from the Witch's Forest to Julius. Julius says that he knows where the hideout of the Eye of the Midnight Sun is, but also says that they are getting ready for a battle again. Two of the magic stones are now with the Wizard King, and one (unknown to all) is at the Black Bulls' headquarters.
| 67 | 67 | "A Fun Festival Double Date"; Transliteration: "Tanoshī o Matsuri Daburu Dēto" (Japanese: 楽しいお祭りW(ダブル)デート) | Shigehisa Iida | Kanichi Katō | Shirō Shibata | January 22, 2019 | April 28, 2019 |
The Star Festival is approaching during which the Wizard King will reveal which Magic Knight squad has earned the most stars. Asta invites Kahono and Kiato to the festival and gives them a vial of the Witch Queen's blood, restoring Kiato's leg and Kahono's voice. Kiato is still in love with Noelle while Kahono, seeing that Noelle is failing to profess her feelings for Asta, clings to Asta, hoping to make Noelle jealous enough to confess. When this fails, she takes them to a haunted house to scare Noelle into Asta's arms. But this also fails when Sekke, who was using the haunted house to impress women, is mistaken by Asta for one of Rades Spiritos zombies. Kahono asks Asta what he thinks of Noelle, but before he answers, they reunite a lost child with her mother. Noelle uses her status as a royal to shame the other nearby nobles for their arrogance. Asta decides that he likes Noelle a lot. Kahono hopes Noelle will finally tell Asta she likes him too but is disappointed when Noelle hits him. Yami engages in a duel with the Green Mantis Captain, Jack the Ripper.
| 68 | 68 | "Battle to the Death?! Yami vs. Jack"; Transliteration: "Shitō!? Yami Bāsasu Jakku" (Japanese: 死闘!? ヤミVSジャック) | Directed by : Shigeki Awai; Storyboarded by : Amenoichi | Kazuyuki Fudeyasu | Sayuri Sakimoto | January 29, 2019 | May 5, 2019 |
Noelle finds Asta working at a grilled squid stall with Yami who is competing against Jack the Ripper and Sekke who are working at a grilled meat stall. Neither stall is attracting customers. Yami and Jack resort to increasingly childish games before deciding to duel instead. Yami has Finral teleport everybody to the cave where the Black Bulls first fought Licht. Disguising himself as an elderly woman, the Wizard King follows to observe. As they duel Yami almost uses Dark Cloaked Dimension Slash which he used to kill Vetto. Sekke and the Black Bulls worry that either Jack or Yami might die. The Wizard King freezes everybody with Time Magic, casts a spell that causes Yami and Jack's pants to fall, and then unfreezes them. With their underwear exposed Yami and Jack call it a draw and return to their stalls. Noelle, having heard Sekke claim that only close friends can fight so seriously, tells Asta she would not mind fighting him, though Asta misses the point entirely. Yami and Jack get in another fight and when Asta tries to intervene he is thrown into the air again. When he lands, he spots a beautiful woman he feels he has seen somewhere before.
| 69 | 69 | "The Briar Maiden's Melancholy"; Transliteration: "Ibara Otome no Yūutsu" (Japanese: 荊乙女の憂鬱) | Ayataka Tanemura | Momoko Murakami | Kosei Takahashi | February 5, 2019 | May 12, 2019 |
An arrogant nobleman, Baron Balmain, tries to force the woman to be his partner but she defeats him with Briar Magic, revealing herself to be Charlotte Roselei, Captain of the Blue Roses. Charlotte is embarrassed when Yami sees her in a dress instead of her captain's uniform. Vanessa arrives and the two women instinctively develop a jealous rivalry over Yami. Vanessa challenges Charlotte to a duel, but to avoid a fight Finral turns the duel into a cosplay contest. The cosplay contest ends in a draw after Charlotte becomes embarrassed and scares away the audience. Vanessa challenges her to a drinking contest, but as Vanessa is already drunk, she passes out quickly, while Charlotte turns out to be a lightweight. In a flashback, an 18-year-old Charlotte loses control of her powers and despite her efforts in breaking the curse placed upon her, she almost destroys an entire city until Yami rescues her. He told her that while he likes strong women, it's okay to rely on others; this caused Charlotte to fall in love with him and the curse was broken as a result. In the present, Yami assures Charlotte she can ask others for help and then finishes her drink for her. The "indirect kiss" embarrasses Charlotte so much she passes out as well and the drinking contest is declared a draw. The ceremony to announce the squad's achievements begins; only captains Yami and Charlotte are now late.
| 70 | 70 | "Two New Stars"; Transliteration: "Futatsu no Shinsei" (Japanese: 二つの新星) | Directed by : Yoshizō Tsuda; Storyboarded by : Taisuke Mori | Kanichi Katō | Sayuri Sakimoto | February 12, 2019 | May 19, 2019 |
The captains (save for Yami and Charlotte) gather for the ceremony, among them being the Crimson Lions' new leader, Mereoleona Vermillion and the new captain of the Purple Orcas, Kaiser Granvorka The Wizard King announces the Golden Dawn has come in first place and to everybody's surprise the Black Bulls have risen from last to second place. The crowd begins to accuse the Bulls of cheating until Kahono, Kiato and Rebecca defend them. Yami throws Asta onto the stage next to Yuno. Sekke attempts to mock them by revealing their origins as peasants, but they display their powers, impressing the crowd. The Silver Eagles are outraged they scored less than Noelle did. The king of the Clover Kingdom, Augustus Kira Clover XIII arrives, though it's clear the citizens prefer Julius over him. To gain praise he announces he has located the Midnight Sun's hideout and is forming a squad of Royal Knights to destroy them (despite Julius doing most of the work). This earns him some of the crowd's respect until Asta asks why the King can choose the Royal Knights when he has personally done nothing to help the Kingdom. The King sentences Asta and Yuno to death, forcing the Wizard King to intervene. The Wizard King warns Asta and Yuno the Royal Knight exam will be extremely difficult for rookies like themselves. Asta and Yuno witness Mereoleona Vermillion, punishing her squad for only making it to fifth place.
| 71 | 71 | "The Uncrowned, Undefeated Lioness"; Transliteration: "Mukan Muhai no Onna Shishi" (Japanese: 無冠無敗の女獅子) | Directed by : Fumio Maezono; Storyboarded by : Jun Kamiya | Momoko Murakami | Hirokimi Shiratori | February 19, 2019 | May 26, 2019 |
Mereoleona is the violent older sister of Fuegoleon. Leo and Asta immediately admire her intensity. She announces she is taking the Crimson Lions on Hot Spring Training and insists Asta and Yuno also come along. Leo advises them to obey as Mereoleona is the Uncrowned Undefeated Lioness even stronger than Fuegoleon. Elsewhere Mereoleona finds Yami in a bar were he was bragging his squad's success to the other captains. She captures him, Charlotte, and Charlotte's subordinate, Sol Marron, and Noelle, announcing they all need training. Julius, disguised as a bartender, watches them leave. The hot spring turns out to be on top of the constantly erupting Yultim Volcano, set above a well of powerful mana. Despite the dangerous levels of heat everyone races to the top using their own magic to protect themselves from it. Yami realises this is the point of Mereoleona's training. Noelle becomes more determined after Mereoleona compliments her on how much she has become like her mother. Asta finds that as the heat is natural, not magical, his swords are useless, and he nearly passes out. Mereoleona warns him that ascending the volcano without magic is impossible and advises him to quit, but Asta is determined to get to the top with his strength alone.
| 72 | 72 | "Saint Elmo's Fire"; Transliteration: "Sento Erumo no Hi" (Japanese: セントエルモの火) | Directed by : Tazumi Mukaiyama; Storyboarded by : Hirotsugu Kawasaki | Kanichi Katō | Takaya Sunagawa & Shunji Akasaka | February 26, 2019 | June 2, 2019 |
Asta realises his usual tactics will not work and decides to try the power of the Anti-Magic devil. By using Ki detection on himself, Asta senses the Anti-Magic energy within his sword and succeeds in increasing the Anti-Magic in his body, causing half his body to become covered in black magic. However, as he cannot yet control the Anti-Magic, it pulls him wildly into the air. The other magic knights are blocked by a lava monster, but Asta flies straight through its chest and continues upwards, even passing Yuno. Upon seeing it, Leo dubs the form "Black Asta". Mereoleona uses a Flame Magic clad punch to stop his uncontrolled flight. Asta is happy he has finally used his power. Mereoleona orders everybody to get in the hot spring together. This causes outrage among the men and women until Sol use her Earth Magic to put up a mud wall to provide separate bathing areas. Mereoleona reveals to Noelle that her mother, Acier Silva, was nicknamed Steel Warrior Princess, and Mereoleona never once defeated her. Mereoleona orders Noelle the opportunity to surpass her mother in her own way. Meanwhile Yami demands the men partake in the tradition of peeping at the women, passing it off as a male-only training exercise. Sol responds by raising the wall even higher while the Crimson Lions try desperately to climb it. Asta refuses to peep out of loyalty to Sister Lily.
| 73 | 73 | "The Royal Knights Selection Test"; Transliteration: "Roiyaru Naitsu Senbatsu Shiken" (Japanese: 王撰騎士団(ロイヤルナイツ)選抜試験) | Directed by : Akira Shimizu; Storyboarded by : Yukihiro Matsushita | Momoko Murakami | Sayuri Sakimoto & Itsuko Takeda | March 5, 2019 | June 9, 2019 |
Xerx Lugner, vice-captain of the Purple Orcas, arrives for the Royal Knight exam and is brutally defeated by a masked man who steals his Purple Orca robe. Finral is revealed to have gotten a new hair-style to boost his confidence for the exam. Noelle's brother, Solid, attempts to make her nervous by telling her to leave before she embarrasses herself, but having received encouragement from Mereoleona at the hot springs, she stands up to him. The Clover King announces the exam will consist of team battles. Each team must destroy a crystal held by an opposing team whilst defending their own crystal. The aim is to find teams that can cooperate with other teams, as they would if they had to face the Midnight Sun in battle. Asta finds himself teamed with Mimosa and Xerx, though Xerx's place is taken by the masked man who claims to be Xerx. Since no one has ever actually seen Xerx they cannot prove he is lying, save for Julius and Marx who decide to stay quiet. With all the teams identified they are teleported to the exam battlefield where Noelle realises her first battle will be against Solid's team. The Wizard King announces the first battle will be Asta's team against a team of three unknown magic knights.
| 74 | 74 | "Flower of Resolution"; Transliteration: "Chikai no Hana" (Japanese: 誓いの花) | Directed by : Mihiro Yamaguchi; Storyboarded by : Masayuki Takahashi | Momoko Murakami | Hirokimi Shiratori | March 12, 2019 | June 16, 2019 |
As Asta, Mimosa and "Xerx" discuss a strategy, their crystal is attacked by the enemy team consisting of Rick Cornell of the Coral Peacocks, Forti Griss of the Crimson Lions and Curtis Wolne of the Silver Eagles. Asta and Mimosa realise that "Xerx" has gone to sleep. Mimosa suggests they move towards the enemy so Asta can destroy their crystal directly. Mimosa attacks with her flower cannon magic forcing the enemy team to defend their crystal. They split up and Asta rushes towards Curtis who has his team's crystal, but Rick and Forti surround Mimosa to attack their crystal while Asta is caught by a paralysis trap. As they all attack Mimosa their spells are absorbed by more trap spells, magnified and reflected back towards them, defeating them instantly. While Mimosa heals Asta it is revealed that the traps were "Xerx's" Ash Magic and with the enemy incapacitated "Xerx" destroys their crystal while humiliating Curtis. Asta's team are declared the winners. The next team to fight is Sol, Magna and Kirsch Vermillion of the Coral Peacocks, Mimosa's embarrassing and egotistical older brother.
| 75 | 75 | "Fierce Battle"; Transliteration: "Gekisen" (Japanese: 激戦) | Directed by : Shigeki Awai; Storyboarded by : Ichizō Kobayashi | Kanichi Katō | Sayuri Sakimoto | March 19, 2019 | June 23, 2019 |
Kirsch mocks Asta's attempts to overcome his lack of magic with strength training. As Kirsch's team begin their duel Asta asks why "Xerx" is taking the exam, as earlier he said he had another more important goal, but is unsuccessful. Despite being a narcissist, Kirsch shows his skill as the Coral Peacocks vice-captain by expertly showing Sol and Magna how to better utilise their spells in combat and his Cherry Blossom Magic to win the match. Finral is teamed with Leo and Hamon of the Golden Dawn who uses Glass Magic and they easily win their match with Finral teleporting Leopold and Hamon around the battlefield like he learned to do with Asta. Finral's brother, Langris, is teamed with Sekke and Flagil Tormenta of the Aqua Deer's, but Langris wins the match mostly by himself, using his Spatial Magic to simply slice their opponents crystal in half before mocking Finral's magic as inferior to his own. Finral vows not to lose the exam against Langris.
| 76 | 76 | "Mage X"; Transliteration: "Madō-shi Ekkusu" (Japanese: 魔道士X(エックス)) | Directed by : Rokō Ogiwara; Storyboarded by : Taisuke Mori | Kazuyuki Fudeyasu | Takaya Sunagawa & Shunji Akasaka | March 26, 2019 | June 30, 2019 |
Finral worries he made a mistake by challenging his brother. As round 5 of the exam begins one of the participants calling himself Mage X is revealed to be Rill Boismortier, Captain of the Aqua Deers. He is accompanied by Walter, the overdramatic and incredibly fast butler to the Boismortier family who is happy Rill befriended Asta. As the duel starts Rill is quickly captured by the opposing team. Walter remembers that Rill was never able to create the paintings he wanted to so his magic ran out of control, frequently destroying the family castle and driving his mother to despair. After accidentally injuring Walter, he suggests Rill join the magic knights so he could create beautiful art in battle, eventually becoming the youngest captain in history. Rill finally reveals his Picture Magic, which use any type of magic simply by painting it, and defeats the enemy team by painting spells they were weak against. In the next match Luck is teamed with Klaus and Puli Angel from the Blue Roses. Klaus worries that their opposing team contains Rob Vitesse, a Wind Magic user from the Silver Eagles.
| 77 | 77 | "Bad Blood"; Transliteration: "In'nen" (Japanese: 因縁) | Directed by : Akihiro Nagao; Storyboarded by : Yukihiro Matsushita | Momoko Murakami | Ai Nakatani | April 2, 2019 | July 7, 2019 |
Klaus and Luck demonstrate how their skills have improved while Puki demonstrates her Wing Magic and after a short fight they are victorious as Luck defeats Rob with a powerful lightning kick that also destroys the crystal. Noelle is teamed with Yuno and En Ringard from the Green Praying Mantises. The instant the match begins Solid is determined to defeat and mock Noelle. Taking advantage of this Noelle moves to attack Solid's crystal knowing he will be unable to resist chasing her. Yuno faces Alecdora Sandler, a fellow Golden Dawn member who hates Yuno for becoming Vangeance's favourite despite being a peasant. Solid's teammate Dmitri Brint is immobilised by En's Fungus Magic. Noelle faces Solid alone and though Solid scratches her face she realises that his Water Magic no longer frightens her. Yuno easily defeats Alecdora without any help from Sylph. Meanwhile, Noelle finally destroys Solid's crystal with her Sea Dragon's Roar, knocking him out.
| 78 | 78 | "Peasant Trap"; Transliteration: "Gemin no Wana" (Japanese: 下民の罠) | Directed by : Fumio Maezono; Storyboarded by : Masayuki Takahashi | Momoko Murakami | Hirokimi Shiratori | April 9, 2019 | July 14, 2019 |
After his team's victory Yuno comments on how easily noble fall apart when they stumble. Much to the irritation of both the Clover King and Solid, Asta and Yuno have made it through the first round. For the second round Asta's team face Kirsch's team. Zora looks forward to his chance to humiliate a royal. Asta confronts "Xerx" about his cheating, but "Xerx" points out he has not technically broken any rules. Kirsch covers the entire battlefield in a storm of flower petal illusion magic. Asta uses his Black form to perform a new move, Black Hurricane, which erases the petals, nullifies Kirsch's illusions and even nullifies all "Xerx's" traps. "Xerx" is irritated until Asta tells him he never cared about his tactics; he only wanted them to work as a team. "Xerx" (whose real name is reaveled to be Zora) has a flashback to his father and decides to cooperate by revealing how his magic works. Kirsch is furious his beautiful spell was ruined by Asta’s peasant magic, and upon learning Magna's a peasant too, abandons him and Sol to attack alone. Asta tries to draw him into Zora's new traps but Kirsch avoids them with detection magic. He begins to attack Asta but suddenly falls into a pit Zora dug by hand, so as to avoid it being discovered by Kirsch’s detection magic. Asta then knocks the furious Kirsch unconscious and thanks Zora for working as a team.
| 79 | 79 | "Mister Delinquent vs. Muscle Brains"; Transliteration: "Yankī Senpai Bāsasu Kin'niku Baka" (Japanese: ヤンキー先輩VS筋肉バカ) | Directed by : Matsuo Asami; Storyboarded by : Yukihiro Matsushita | Momoko Murakami | Sayuri Sakimoto & Ai Nakatani | April 16, 2019 | July 21, 2019 |
Sol hides their crystal inside her golem and traps Mimosa. Magna attacks with a new fireball Asta is unable to deflect. Kirsch dreams of a starving peasant child he saw stealing and felt only disgust. Sol remembers when she was almost kidnapped by bandits and a boy who had promised to protect her was too scared to fight, and she was saved by Captain Charlotte instead. Sol berates Kirsch for fighting only for selfish reasons. Asta begins to anticipate Magna's attacks and Zora casts a trap that knocks Magna unconscious. Kirsch tries to unleash his full power on Asta but is caught in another trap and knocked out by Asta again. Sol finds her golem has been infiltrated by Mimosa's plants, allowing Asta to destroy the crystal. Zora points out where Sol, Magna and Kirsch need improvements. Mimosa recalls the starving child being fed by another starving child which made her realise that a peasant's difficult life can sometimes make them the kindest people. She congratulates Kirsch on acknowledging Asta's peasant strength and claims he has never looked more beautiful to her. Kirsch admits to himself that watching Asta duel with Magna was beautiful in its own way. The Clover King is furious a royal was defeated by a peasant. The next match is to be Finral's team against Langris' team.
| 80 | 80 | "Special Little Brother vs. Failed Big Brother"; Transliteration: "Yūtōsei no Otōto Bāsasu Fudeki no Ani" (Japanese: 優等生の弟VS不出来の兄) | Ayataka Tanemura | Kanichi Katō | Kosei Takahashi | April 23, 2019 | July 28, 2019 |
Langris recalls how his parents doted on him and arranged for him to marry a noble lady named Finnes Calmreich, whereas Finral was neglected. Langris was enraged to find Finnes preferred the weaker Finral instead of him. Langris attacks Finral's crystal, expecting to defeat Finral easily but is shocked when Finral cancels his attack. Finral explains that when two different spatial spells collide the mana currents cancel each other out. Leopold and Hamon attack the enemy crystal and duel with Flagil and her Snow Magic. Finral teleports Sekke away to the Black Bulls base where he is punished by Yami for disturbing him on the toilet. Enraged that Finral dare stand up to him Langris prepares his most powerful attack spell. Finral, who always regretted not being closer to Langris, begs him to stop. Further enraged at Finral's attempt to act like an older brother Langris attacks and though Finral tries to fight back his crystal is destroyed and parts of his body are violently teleported away. Langris' team are declared the winners. Langris recalls that while his parents loved him for being powerful everyone else loved Finral for being kind. Unable to handle his rage Langris prepares to attack and murder the unconscious Finral, but is stopped when Asta and the Black Bulls furiously storm onto the battlefield to defend Finral.
| 81 | 81 | "The Life of a Certain Man"; Transliteration: "Aru Hitori no Otoko no Ikikata" (Japanese: ある一人の男の生き方) | Directed by : Akira Shimizu; Storyboarded by : Shigehisa Iida | Kazuyuki Fudeyasu | Hirokimi Shiratori | April 30, 2019 | August 4, 2019 |
The Wizard King intervenes while Finral's wounds are treated. Asta insults Langris' behaviour as unworthy of a magic knight. Langris requests the Wizard King allow him to fight the Black Bulls for their semi-final match, then attacks Asta. The Wizard King intervenes with his Time Magic and decides to allow the fight on condition it is fought by exam rules using their normal teams. Many people notice that Langris is not acting like himself. A flashback shows that the Wizard King suspects a magic knight might be a traitor without even realising it and is using the exam to identify the unwitting knight. Langris abandons his teammates and attacks Asta, demanding that he admit Finral is weak and Langris is a true knight. Asta loses body parts but fights on with help from Mimosa's healing magic. Knowing he cannot use his Black Asta form again, Asta maneuvers Langris into Zora's trap. Zora remembers his father, the first commoner to become a magic knight who was murdered by his own squad for being a peasant. Zora then took on the character of a doll his father gave him, a warrior who protected the country in secret, and became a vigilante specialising in punishing magic knights who abused their powers, including the real Xerx Lugner who threatened an old lady for asking about her granddaughter. Back in the present, Zora denounces them and Lagris of being true magic knights.
| 82 | 82 | "Petit Clover! The Nightmarish Charmy SP!" (Note: Funimation's English translation for episode 82 was "Clover Clips: The Nightmarish Charmy Special!"); Transliteration: "Puchitto Kurōbā! Akumu no Chāmī Supesharu!" (Japanese: プチット・クローバー!悪夢のチャーミーSP(スペシャル)!) | Rokō Ogiwara | Kazuyuki Fudeyasu | N/A | May 7, 2019 | August 11, 2019 |
As Asta and Zora battle Langris, Charmy wanders into the forest seeking exotic ingredients to cook something tasty for Yuno and the Wizard King. After sampling a toxic mushroom she passes out and she and her sheep chefs begin to experience vivid hallucinations in the form of short 30 second sketches that feature members of the Black Bulls and other Black Clover characters in their Chibi forms. Charmy eventually awakens and, realising she has been dreaming the whole time, resumes her search for exotic ingredients. Back on the battlefield Zora prepares to punish Langris for failing to uphold the ideals of an honorable magic knight, including Xerx who was abusing an old woman before Zora defeated him.
| 83 | 83 | "Burn It Into You"; Transliteration: "Ima, Yakitsukeru" (Japanese: 今、焼き付ける) | Directed by : Tazumi Mukaiyama; Storyboarded by : Yukihiro Matsushita | Momoko Murakami | Hirokimi Shiratori & Ai Nakatani | May 14, 2019 | August 18, 2019 |
Langris manages to send several spatial attacks past Zora's trap, but Zora reveals he had inscribed a trap onto his own body and Langris' spells are reflected back at him. Langris survives using even more powerful magic while Zora is left exhausted. Langris boasts of his superiority and attacks the weakened Zora but has his spells nullified by Asta in his Black form. Asta admits he admires Langris' abilities but has no respect for his forgetting that the exam was supposed to be about working together. Langris tries killing Asta but is knocked out, causing his crystal to be destroyed. Simultaneously, Asta's own crystal falls apart and their match is declared a draw. As always Zora both mocks and gives advice to everyone, including himself for not trusting his teammates. Asta passes out surrounded by all the magic knights who agree they must work together. The next match is Luck's team against Captain Rill's. Luck, Klaus and Puli combine their magic into a super-fast lightning arrow, but Rill redirects it, destroying their crystal instantly. In the next match Yuno beats the opposing team by himself without help from Noelle or En. Julius announces that the final match will be Yuno, Noelle and En versus Captain Rill's team.
| 84 | 84 | "The Victors"; Transliteration: "Shōsha" (Japanese: 勝者) | Directed by : Tatsuya Yoshihara & Yoshino Miwa; Storyboarded by : Tatsuya Yoshihara | Kanichi Katō | Takaya Sunagawa & Shunji Akasaka | May 21, 2019 | August 25, 2019 |
Yuno and Rill prepare to fight. Asta is upset he missed his chance to duel Yuno in the final match. Yuno and Rill begin their duel while Rill's teammates duel Noelle and En. Yuno is unable to get past Rill's defences. As Rill is a squad captain Yuno decides to use a spell he was saving for his duel with Asta. Yuno uses a new spell, Spirit Dive, combining his battle experience with his vast amount of mana to merge himself with Sylph, with green mana covering his left arm, with half a crown floating on his head with his hair taking on a green tint, his left eye turing green and sprouting a fairy-like wing. Using the full power of Sylph, Yuno attacks Rill, and though Rill manages to block Yuno's spell his crystal is destroyed. Julius determines that Rill used so much power he accidentally blew up his own crystal, resulting in victory for Yuno's team. Julius announces that based on their performance during the exam he will select between 10 and 20 knights to become Royal Knights. Julius determines that Langris was being secretly manipulated by the Midnight Sun, but remains suspicious that something else is going on. Despite feeling upset, Asta swears to Yuno that he will catch up to him one day. Zora is later confronted by Julius, who reveals he knew Zora's father, Zara, and that he created the star system to memorialize Zara. Julius also reveals his intention of making Zora a Royal Knight, but advises the youth to wear his true squad's robe from now on.
Eye of the Midnight Sun: Subjugation Arc
| 85 | 85 | "Together in the Bath"; Transliteration: "Hadaka no Tsukiai" (Japanese: 裸の付き合い) | Directed by : Akihiro Nagao; Storyboarded by : Masayuki Takahashi | Kazuyuki Fudeyasu | Sayuri Sakimoto | May 28, 2019 | September 1, 2019 |
Having failed to face Yuno in a duel, Asta becomes depressed and unresponsive to the Black Bulls efforts to cheer him up. The other Black Bulls are all nervous about the exam results and excited to find out which of them has been chosen as a Royal Knight. To snap them all out of their odd behavior, Yami orders them to participate in a team bath. While in the bath, Yami reminisces about his past when he first joined the Aqua Deers when the Magic Knight Squad was known as the Grey Deers under the command of Julius Novachrono. Accepting a job to protect a village's harvest from bandits in exchange for food, Yami finds himself overwhelmed by the bandits' numbers until he received aid from his fellow Grey Deer member William Vangeance. Yami and Vangeance managed to capture all the bandits but their leader, the two deciding to become rivals from that day on.
| 86 | 86 | "Yami and Vangeance"; Transliteration: "Yami to Vanjansu" (Japanese: ヤミとヴァンジャンス) | Directed by : Masahiro Okamura; Storyboarded by : Shigehisa Iida | Kazuyuki Fudeyasu | Sayuri Sakimoto | June 4, 2019 | September 8, 2019 |
Yami continues his story to Asta, telling him of how he and Vangeance were vice-captains after their former captain Julius became the current Wizard King. Julius sends Yami and Vangeance to deal with bandits being led by traitors within the Magic Knights. Vangeance spread false rumors to trick the bandits into raiding two villages, one overseen by himself and the other by Yami. The bandits attacked Yami's village with Yami finding the bandit leader that escaped him years ago among them, easily defeating him despite the bandit possessing a powerful staff. But Yami is trapped by two traitorous Magic Knights, Goht of the Crimson Lions and Mohl of the Silver Eagles. They attempted to kill Yami to cover up their crimes, but Yami was rescued by Vangeance and they defeat the traitors. After their promotion to Squad Captains, Yami forms the Black Bulls to take in various misfits while Vangeance established the Golden Dawn to accept the nobles' exceptionally strong mages. Asta fails to see the moral of Yami's story, to never quit no matter how many times Yuno beats him, and is punished for being an idiot. Asta regains his former spirit and joins the other Black Bulls in waiting for the exam results before Mereoleona makes a sudden and violent arrival.
| 87 | 87 | "Formation of the Royal Knights"; Transliteration: "Roiyaru Naitsu Kessei" (Japanese: 王撰騎士団(ロイヤルナイツ)結成) | Directed by : Rokō Ogiwara; Storyboarded by : Yukihiro Matsushita | Kanichi Katō | Takaya Sunagawa & Shunji Akasaka | June 11, 2019 | September 15, 2019 |
Mereoleona kidnaps Asta, Noelle and Luck, revealing they and one other member of their group have all passed the exam and are now Royal Knights. Mereoleona takes them to the oath ceremony to meet their fellow Royal Knights, including Yuno, Klaus, Mimosa, Kirch, Nils Ragus, En Ringard, Puli Angel, Rill Boismortier, Fragil Tormenta, Hamon Caseus. Mereoleona announces herself as their captain before Zora arrives in Black Bull robes, revealing that he was a vigilante until Yami brought him into the Black Bulls after defeating him. He finally introduces himself to the others by his real name, Zora Ideale. Mereoleona provides everybody with new Royal Knight Robes while revealing that several other Royal Knight members like Nozel were only accepted despite not taking the exam as their magic is needed to facing the Midnight Sun, who are based in a floating dungeon located in the Gravito Stones area. Inside the dungeon, Rhya dreams of a moment from his past as an elf where Licht married a human named Tetia, the half-elf child they conceived meant to be a bridge between their peoples.
| 88 | 88 | "Storming the Eye of the Midnight Sun's Hideout!!!"; Transliteration: "Byakuya no Magan Ajito - Totsunyū!!!" (Japanese: 白夜の魔眼アジト 突入!!!) | Directed by : Fumio Maezono; Storyboarded by : Taisuke Mori | Kanichi Katō | Hirokimi Shiratori | June 18, 2019 | September 22, 2019 |
Asta and Noelle visit Leopold in hospital where Fuegoleon is still in a coma. Having both received encouragement from Fuegoleon, Asta and Noelle swear to defeat the Midnight Sun on his behalf. Asta shares his confusion with Noelle about something Vetto said about not being able to forgive humans. Klaus warns them to be vigilant against the Midnight Sun's spies, though as they leave a shadow attaches itself to Asta and follows them. Klaus worries that despite being the strongest knights in the kingdom; most of the Royal Knights are also some of the worst troublemakers, such as Luck and Zora. The shadow attempts to spy on Mereoleona but she spots and exposes it as a spy whom she captures and interrogates. She decides they will attack the Midnight Sun in the morning rather than in three days, though several members suspects she always intended to do so. To infiltrate the Midnight Sun's hideout they split into teams with orders to reach the centre by any means necessary. Mereoleona teams up with Asta and Zora. As the battle begins Rhya decides to join the battle, activating the Third Eye in his forehead while secretly revealing Licht is not in the hideout but is somewhere else entirely.
| 89 | 89 | "The Black Bulls' Hideout"; Transliteration: "Kuro no Bōgyū Ajito" (Japanese: 黒の暴牛アジト) | Directed by : Yoshizō Tsuda; Storyboarded by : Shigehisa Iida | Kazuyuki Fudeyasu | Sayuri Sakimoto & Itsuko Takeda | June 25, 2019 | October 6, 2019 (Note: Adult Swim showed a Dragon Ball Super marathon on September 28–29, 2019) |
Yami is summoned to the Golden Dawn so Captain Vangeance can apologise for Langris injuring Finral. Vanessa leaves to visit Finral, Magna leaves to train alone and Charmy leaves to search for new ingredients. Gauche, Grey and Gordon remain behind. Gauche becomes interested in why all the rooms keep rearranging and recalls stories Charmy and Vanessa told of seeing a ghost. The base is suddenly attacked by zombies summoned by Rades Spirito, along with Sally and Valtos. Gauche destroys the zombies before learning from Sally that Licht has forbidden them from killing him. Sally reinforces one of the zombies, making it more powerful, but it is destroyed by Gordon's Poison Magic. She tries to attack with her gel salamander, but Grey uses Transformation Magic to turn the gel to crystal, which Gauche shatters. Rades summons a new zombie, No. 0 Mikael Caesar, which is made from the corpses of two squad captains and uses both Wind and Plant Magic. Zombies swarm into the base, infuriating Grey and Gordon, who consider the base to be their real home, and they both speak loudly and clearly for the first time that they will protect it. An alarm suddenly sounds from the base which violently rearranges itself in response to being invaded, revealing a mage with long, light blue hair concealed inside, who demands to know what is going on.
| 90 | 90 | "Crazy Magic Battle"; Transliteration: "Muchakucha na Mahōsen" (Japanese: ムチャクチャな魔法戦) | Directed by : Ryōhei Horiuchi; Storyboarded by : Shinji Ishihira | Kazuyuki Fudeyasu | Sayuri Sakimoto & Itsuko Takeda | July 2, 2019 | October 13, 2019 |
The mage, who has complete control of the building, reveals he knows all the Black Bulls' names and Gauche realises he must have been living there secretly for years. The mage explains he suffers from an illness rendering him only able to survive by siphoning magic from others. Years ago, Yami allowed him to secretly siphon small amounts of magic from the squad's members in return for the use of his home as the Black Bulls base. The mage finally introduces himself as Henry Legolant, the owner of the Black Bulls' hideout. Valtos locates the stone Asta found after defeating Heath Grice; meanwhile Henry uses his Recombination Magic to rearrange the base into a giant Minotaur, the Raging Black Bull. Henry reveals that after Asta accidentally found his room and started visiting him regularly he started thinking of the Black Bulls as his friends. Henry dons his own Black Bull robe and begins beating Mikael Caesar. Sally summons a giant gel salamander which overpowers the Minotaur. Gauche creates dozens of Grey clones who transform the gel into plants which are destroyed by Gordon’s poison. With the stone in hand Valtos, Sally and Rades retreat. Henry reveals he has run out of magic and cannot turn the Minotaur back into their base. Valtos takes the stone to Licht hiding under the giant demon skull and he returns it to the stone tablet, revealing only two stones are still required which Licht plans to retrieve personally.
| 91 | 91 | "Mereoleona vs. Raia the Disloyal" (Note: Funimation's English translation for episode 91 was "Mereoleona vs. Rhya the Disloyal"); Transliteration: "Mereoreona Bāsasu Fujitsu no Raia" (Japanese: メレオレオナVS不実のライア) | Ayataka Tanemura | Kazuyuki Fudeyasu | Kosei Takahashi | July 9, 2019 | October 20, 2019 |
Yuno learns from a defeated mage that the Midnight Sun is planning to be reborn into their true forms. Asta encounters a clone of himself causing confusion, until Mereoleona sets them both on fire, exposing Rhya as capable of using Copy Magic to recreate the spells of other mages. He attempts to use Yami's Darkness magic but Mereoleona sets his spell on fire then punches him in the face. Elsewhere, Mereoleona's brother, Fuegoleon, appears to almost awaken from his coma. Mereoleona's power proves to be a match for Rhya's multiple magic's, even with his third eye activated. Zora reveals that Mereoleona spends most of her time living in the wilderness and has grown impossibly powerful by absorbing nature's magic. Furious, Rhya summons a copy of Asta's Demon-Slayer Sword, but it is easily destroyed by Mereoleona as it was merely a copy of the sword and contained no Anti-Magic. Mereoleona reveals she can use a powerful ability, Mana Zone, to completely control all the magic within a defined space, and annihilates Rhya, shocking Asta who knows from experience how powerful members of the Third Eye are. Elsewhere, Yuno's skill leads Mimosa to suspect Yuno is also capable of using Mana Zone. They follow the sound of a powerful heartbeat and find a mage floating within a sphere of light.
| 92 | 92 | "The Wizard King vs. the Leader of the Eye of the Midnight Sun"; Transliteration: "Mahōtei Bāsasu Byakuya no Magan Tōshu" (Japanese: 魔法帝VS白夜の魔眼頭首) | Directed by : Akira Shimizu; Storyboarded by : Yukihiro Matsushita | Kanichi Katō | Hirokimi Shiratori | July 16, 2019 | October 27, 2019 |
Yami is revealed to be at Golden Dawn headquarters still waiting for Vangeance. Vangeance meets the Wizard King in secret and thanks him for all he has done for him since Vangeance was a child. He then expresses regret that he cannot choose between Julius and his lifelong partner and has opted instead to let Julius and his partner decide for him. Vangeance then transforms, his facial scars disappearing as he becomes Licht, the leader of the Eye of the Midnight Sun. Julius, who had always harboured suspicions about Vangeance, is shocked to learn Vangeance had two souls within his body, one of them an elf. Licht explains that after the massacre of his people his goal is no longer peace, but the eradication of all humans, for which they need the last two magic stones in Julius' possession. They duel, Licht's Light Magic against Julius' Time Magic. Julius is wounded leading Licht to believe victory will be easy, until Julius reveals the true nature of his time magic, along with a minor ability to sense the future, is to steal the future time of his opponents for his own use, and heals his wounds by reversing time on himself. Julius explains his goal is a future free from discrimination and he plans to keep on living until his goal is realised. Licht attacks again but finds himself overpowered as Julius easily predicts each of his moves.
| 93 | 93 | "Julius Novachrono"; Transliteration: "Yuriusu Novakurono" (Japanese: ユリウス・ノヴァクロノ) | Directed by : Rokō Ogiwara; Storyboarded by : Tatsuya Yoshihara | Kanichi Katō | Takaya Sunagawa & Shunji Akasaka | July 23, 2019 | November 3, 2019 |
Marx, the Wizard King's advisor, sends word to every squad captain, ordering them to help the Wizard King. Licht's spells cause massive damage to the city, yet Julius holds back so as not to injure Vangeance's body. Julius reveals his Grimoire, which is so large with so many pages it has no cover, just an endless circle of pages around a central spine. Licht comes to believe that as he had planned to unbalance the world by eradicating humans, fate itself conspired to restore balance by creating Julius as the embodiment of order. Licht casts a spell powerful enough to completely wipe out the entire country. Julius recalls his youth as a magic knight, searching for his life's purpose, until he met Zara, Zora's father, who taught him that a true knight should serve the people. After Zara was murdered Julius grew disgusted at the way the class system kept both nobles and commoners from reaching their potential. He decided to become the Wizard King so he could help make the world a better place through the efforts of knights like Asta, Yuno and Noelle. Refusing to give in Julius uses all his accumulated time to reverse the entire country back a few seconds, saving everybody but leaving himself open to Licht who stabs him in the heart. Yami arrives too late to stop him and draws his sword in preparation to kill both Licht and Vangeance.
| 94 | 94 | "New Future"; Transliteration: "Atarashii Mirai" (Japanese: 新しい未来) | Directed by : Tazumi Mukaiyama; Storyboarded by : Yukihiro Matsushita | Kanichi Katō | Ai Nakatani, Sayuri Sakimoto & Itsuko Takeda | July 30, 2019 | November 10, 2019 |
Yami attacks but is too late to stop Licht retrieving the stones and disappearing through a portal. Rhya activates his self-destruct spell to kill Mereoleona. Asta, having seen the same spell used by Vetto and Fana, nullifies it. Asta demands to know why the Midnight Sun hates humans when they themselves appear human. He also insists on trying to understand the Midnight Suns motives and making peace with them, echoing the Wizard Kings wishes. Rhya realises Asta sounds exactly like Licht used to. Julius realises that Licht had enough power by himself to kill everyone in the kingdom; therefore the stones must have another purpose. Julius entrusts his dream of a better world to Yami and all the other magic knights before finally dying. Yuno approaches the mage, who has the ears of an elf. He also notices another black sword nearby. Licht betrays Rades, Sally and Valtos, revealing his total contempt for their human greed and selfishness and also that the stones will not grant them greater magic power but will in fact use them as sacrifices to fuel the resurrection. As he places the stones in the tablet light covers the entire kingdom. Rhya reveals the resurrection has begun as he transforms into an elf. The elf in the sphere of light suddenly awakens while Yuno also begins to transform into an elf.
Elf Reincarnation Arc
| 95 | 95 | "Reincarnation"; Transliteration: "Tensei" (Japanese: 転生) | Directed by : Fumio Maezono; Storyboarded by : Shigehisa Iida | Kazuyuki Fudeyasu | Hirokimi Shiratori | August 6, 2019 | November 17, 2019 |
Hundreds of years ago a young Licht receives his four leaf Grimoire. Patry, a younger elf, asks Licht about rumours that humans are planning to attack their village but Licht assures him there can be peace. Licht uses his Sword Magic to save a human woman named Tetia and meets her brother, a Light Magic user who also possesses a four leaf Grimoire. He suggests combining elven magic with human magic tools to create a peaceful elven/human society. Licht and Tetia eventually fall in love, conceive a child and plan to marry. On the day of the wedding the elves are murdered by a Light magic spell, leading Patry to believe Tetia's brother was the murderer. As Patry dies he sees a distraught Licht cast a forbidden reincarnation spell. Patry awakens centuries later in the body of William Vangeance and realises he is the only one who fully reincarnated. He retrieves a four leaf Grimoire and uses it to reincarnate Rhya, Fana and Vetto into suitable human bodies while passing himself off as the real Licht. To resurrect the entire elven race Patry began his search for all the magic stones stolen from the elven village. In the present Patry sacrifices Sally, Rades and Valtos to fuel the resurrection spell while Yuno completes his transformation into an elf.
| 96 | 96 | "The Black Bulls Captain vs. the Crimson Wild Rose"; Transliteration: "Kuro no Bōgyū Danchō Bāsasu Shinku no Nobara" (Japanese: 黒の暴牛団長VS真紅の野薔薇) | Directed by : Ryōhei Horiuchi; Storyboarded by : Yukihiro Matsushita | Kazuyuki Fudeyasu | Hirokimi Shiratori & Kosei Takahashi | August 13, 2019 | November 24, 2019 |
The Midnight Sun members all begin to disintegrate as they too are sacrificed to fuel the resurrection. All over the Clover Kingdom humans begin to transform as the souls of the elves are reincarnated into their bodies, including most of the Royal Knights. Patry declares that the extinction of humans has begun as the reincarnated elves begin their attack. Yami is confronted by two elves in the bodies of Owen and Marx but he manages to knock both elves unconscious. He is suddenly attacked by the elf possessed Charlotte whose blue roses have turned red. As they fight the elf still acts and moves like Charlotte and Yami realises the resurrection had removed all the lingering effects of her childhood curse and the elf is now using Charlottes full magical power as it was meant to be. Sol arrives to save Charlotte but is eventually convinced by Yami to leave with the Wizard King's body. Yami angrily confronts Charlotte for allowing an elf to control her. The elf responds with one of Charlotte's most powerful spells. Yami, knowing the spell could completely destroy the city, uses his Dark Cloaked Dimension Slash to try and stop it. Back in the Midnight Sun's base Noelle and Kirsch prepare to fight two possessed Royal Knights, one of whom is Luck.
| 97 | 97 | "Overwhelming Disadvantage"; Transliteration: "Attō-teki Ressei" (Japanese: 圧倒的劣勢) | Directed by : Kōji Sasaki; Storyboarded by : Hirotsugu Kawasaki | Kazuyuki Fudeyasu | Hirokimi Shiratori & Hiroshi Numata | August 20, 2019 | December 8, 2019 (Note: Adult Swim showed a Food Wars!: Shokugeki no Soma marathon on November 30–December 1, 2019, exempting everything but My Hero Academia and One-Punch Man) |
Yami's attack cuts Charlottes' in half, damaging the buildings but saving the city. Charlotte retreats with Marx and Owen. The damage to the city breaks open the magical prison and Gueldre Poizot escapes along with Revchi Salik, the disgraced magic knight who once tried to steal Yuno's Grimoire. An elf possessed knight attacks, forcing them to work together. They manage to bind his magic with Revchi's magic binding chains and then escape. The elf possessing Luck almost kills Noelle and Kirsch as their defence is ineffective against Luck's new power. Rhya wishes he could believe Asta’s words of peace, but having once believed the same of Tetia's brother he decides he cannot trust Asta. Rill, now possessed by an elf named Lira, joins the fight. Zora traps the two, allowing Asta to attack and cut Lira's chest, but it has no effect and Rill remains possessed. Rhya explains that as the reincarnation spell is complete and their souls have taken over the human bodies there is no longer a spell to nullify, so Asta's swords are ineffective. Three more possessed Royal Knights appear so Mereoleona forces Asta and Zora to escape while she remains behind to try kill all the possessed knights. Back in the capital her brother, Fuegoleon, almost wakes up again.
| 98 | 98 | "The Sleeping Lion"; Transliteration: "Nemureru Shishi" (Japanese: 眠れる獅子) | Directed by : Yoshizō Tsuda; Storyboarded by : Shinji Ishihira | Kazuyuki Fudeyasu | Hirokimi Shiratori, Itsuko Takeda & Hiroshi Numata | August 27, 2019 | December 15, 2019 |
The Crimson Lions are attacked by Randall, their elf possessed vice-captain, who overpowers them with Air Magic. Leo realises that as they cannot see the air magic, he must sense the magic behind the air to avoid being injured and is able to briefly fight back. The remaining Crimson Lions insist that he flee but Leo refuses and almost unlocks a new spell, but his unfamiliarity with the magic drains all his energy instantly. As Randall moves to kill Leo the entire base becomes engulfed in flames as Fuegoleon furiously awakens from his coma, his destroyed right arm replaced by one made of flames. He reveals he has been chosen as the new host of Salamander, the Spirit of Fire who once belonged to Fana. Furious that Salamander would choose a human royal as his host Randall attacks Fuegoleon, but is swiftly overpowered and restrained by Salamander's fire. Fuegoleon recalls that after Patry severed his arm and took his magic stone he left Fuegoleon alive, though Fuegoleon decides to keep this secret until he learns why. At Golden Dawn headquarters many Golden Dawn members are now possessed, including Langris, now possessed by Patry's cousin, Latry. Elsewhere Finral is forced to wake up from his coma by Yami violently kicking him out of bed. To save Langris, Finral decides to join the battle.
| 99 | 99 | "The Desperate Path Toward Survival"; Transliteration: "Inochigake no Ikiru Michi" (Japanese: 命懸けの生きる道) | Directed by : Fumio Maezono; Storyboarded by : Masayuki Takahashi | Kazuyuki Fudeyasu | Hirokimi Shiratori | September 3, 2019 | January 5, 2020 (Note: Adult Swim showed a One-Punch Man marathon on December 21–22, 2019 and a Dr. Stone marathon on December 28–29, 2019) |
Rhya announces to Mereoleona that their target is Asta, as his Grimoire and Anti-Magic swords once belonged to the real Licht. Asta tries to go back to help Mereoleona but is stopped by Zora. After a short but brutal fight Mereoleona is severely injured by Rhya and decides to use her most powerful spell, Purgatory, that engulfs the room in blue flames. The effort leaves her unable to move, and while the elves are injured, they are not defeated. The elves cast a team spell to kill her but at the last moment Asta and Zora arrive. It is shown that Asta formulated a plan for Zora to intercept the five spells with a trap that doubles the destructive power, shoot it at Asta, then deflect it back at Zora to quadruple it. The result is an explosion that allows Asta and Zora to escape with Mereoleona, however, Rhya manages to grab Asta through a portal to take him to Licht. Elsewhere, Mimosa is the only human left after Yuno, Klaus and Hamon are all possessed. Mimosa is captured before she can escape, just as Rhya drops Asta into the room. Asta is horrified to learn Yuno is also possessed and is now an enemy.
| 100 | 100 | "We Won't Lose to You"; Transliteration: "Omaeni wa Makenai" (Japanese: オマエには負けない) | Directed by : Toshihiro Maeya & Tatsuya Yoshihara; Storyboarded by : Taisuke Mori & Tatsuya Yoshihara | Kazuyuki Fudeyasu | Takaya Sunagawa & Shunji Akasaka | September 10, 2019 | January 12, 2020 |
The elf possessing Klaus realizes that Klaus' soul is trying to retake control so he attacks Asta, injuring him. Rhya offers Mimosa in exchange for Asta's Grimoire but Asta refuses and repeats his promise to become Wizard King. Asta's words are heard by Yuno and he instinctively saves Asta, revealing his soul is back in control, but he has retained the elf’s body and power. Rhya is confused as the reincarnation should have sent Yuno's soul to sleep. As the mage in the sphere of light, revealed to be the real Licht, has not yet moved, Rhya suspects he needs more time to reincarnate. Yuno senses that the possessed knight's souls are asleep while the elves control their bodies, whereas in Yuno's body it is the elf soul that is asleep. Asta activates his Black form while Yuno uses his Spirit Dive form and the two knock Klaus and Hamon unconscious. Licht suddenly awakens and retrieves the nearby fan-tipped black sword, which turns white as he touches it. Nero appears from Asta's robe while Licht steals the Demon-Dweller Sword from Asta before he can react. They duel fiercely but Licht's speed and greater skill with the Anti-Magic swords overwhelms them. Working together Asta and Yuno both manage to surpass their previous limits but Licht uses his unnamed sword to block their attack, which is then retrieved by Asta. Licht attacks and destroys most of the floating dungeon and the surrounding forest. Asta is left unconscious while the unnamed sword turns black and is absorbed into his Grimoire.
| 101 | 101 | "The Lives of the Village in the Sticks"; Transliteration: "Saihate no Mura no Inochi" (Japanese: 最果ての村の命) | Ayataka Tanemura | Kazuyuki Fudeyasu | Kosei Takahashi | September 17, 2019 | January 19, 2020 |
Rhya congratulates Licht on his victory but is confused he did not retrieve the five clover Grimoire, though Licht merely replies the Grimoire does not belong to him anymore. Yuno manages to save Asta and Mimosa. The elves use their magic to begin moving the floating dungeon towards the city. Asta wakes up and meets the other knights who avoided being possessed, Nozel, En, and Kirsch. Nozel is secretly amazed Asta survived a situation that left Mereoleona unconscious. Nozel is contacted by his squad and learns about the other elves. To protect the kingdom Nozel decides the possessed knights should be killed. Noelle reveals Luck may have held Latry back and allowed her to escape, proving the possessed knights are fighting against the elf souls and she insists on saving them instead of killing them. Nozel agrees and they start following the dungeon as it flies over Hage village where another elf has appeared and injured Father Orsi. Nozel allows Asta and Yuno to protect their home but insists Noelle comes with him, suggesting his attitude towards her has radically improved. Sister Lily fights against the elf and Nash, one of the orphans, is almost killed but is saved by Asta and Yuno, determined to protect their home and family.
| 102 | 102 | "Two Miracles"; Transliteration: "Futatsu no Kiseki" (Japanese: 2つのキセキ) | Directed by : Rokō Ogiwara; Storyboarded by : Tatsuya Yoshihara | Kanichi Katō | Itsuko Takeda & Hirokimi Shiratori | September 24, 2019 | January 26, 2020 |
Nero appears to watch the boys from next to the first Wizard Kings statue atop the giant demon skull. As Asta and Yuno fight the elf, a user of Poison Plant Magic, the injured Father Orsi, Sister Lily and the orphans reminisce on their memories of them growing up and then learning about Asta and Yuno's lives as magic knights through the letters they sent home. They recall all Asta and Yuno's most recent experiences with their squads, the Wizard King, The Underwater Temple, the Witches Forest and the Eye of the Midnight Sun. While Yuno fights the elf, Asta tries to use his sword to remove the poison from Father Orsi, but fails as the original spell is gone and cannot be nullified, while the poison remains in Father Orsi's body. Father Orsi manages to tell Asta how proud he is of both him and Yuno and asks that they protect the village then dies from the poison. Asta's grief summons from his grimoire the sword he took from Licht, now as black and rusted as his other swords. As he grasps the sword he experiences a vision of Licht and his Black form activates.
| 103 | 103 | "Release from Misfortune"; Transliteration: "Inga Kaihō" (Japanese: 因果解放) | Directed by : Toshihiro Maeya; Storyboarded by : Yukihiro Matsushita | Kanichi Katō | Keizō Shimizu | October 1, 2019 | February 2, 2020 |
The new sword proves to be far more powerful than Asta's other swords as it removes the poison from everybody and Father Orsi recovers. Asta decides to use his sword to turn the possessed knights back to normal. The elf attacking the village, disgusted by all the humans, tries to unleash all his magic at once. Yuno senses the elf's soul is in great pain and Asta thinks the elf must be asking for help. To prevent the elf from turning into something even more monstrous Asta strikes him in the chest. The new sword proves powerful enough to negate the entire reincarnation spell, returning him to a normal human. The Clover King, who has been asleep with his mistresses the entire time, is awoken and becomes terrified after learning the kingdom is under attack by its own magic knights and squad captains. Asta and Yuno tell Father Orsi and the others everything they know about the elves while Digit, the no longer possessed knight, reveals the elf possessing him had no desire to fight. Asta decides they must save both their human friends and the elves and take Digit with them. The floating dungeon passes over Magna and Vanessa and the possessed Luck decides to attack a nearby village. Yuno senses this and they decide to split up to both follow the dungeon and stop Luck, though they argue about which of them should take Digit with them.
| 104 | 104 | "Lightning of Rage vs. Friends"; Transliteration: "Ikari no Ikazuchi Bāsasu Nakama" (Japanese: 怒りの雷VS仲間) | Shigehisa Iida | Kazuyuki Fudeyasu | Hiroshi Numata | October 8, 2019 | February 9, 2020 |
The elf, Rufel, explains Luck’s body is now his and Vanessa realizes Luck is possessed. Rufel almost murders Magna but is stopped by Vanessa's cat Rouge, the Red String of Fate. Magna tries to attack Rufel but is also stopped by Rouge as she protects all Black Bulls, including Luck. Magna manages to trick Rufel with his knowledge of Luck's physical abilities and blows him up. Magna demands Rufel return Luck but Rufel summons a lightning storm, increasing his powers, and Magna only survives due to Rouge. Rufel realizes that using Rouge costs vast amounts of magic and forces her to save Magna over and over again until Vanessa almost passes out. Rufel claims Luck's soul is dead but Magna spots that he is crying and realizes Luck must be able to hear them, so they desperately try to force Luck to wake up. Rufel almost murders Magna but Rouge uses the last of her magic to alter fate, resulting in Asta appearing at the very last moment. Rufel manages to sense Asta's movements and tries to kill him, but Vanessa attaches a string to Asta, holding him back for a split second causing Rufel to mistime his attack and he is tackled to the ground by all three of them. Asta prepares to stab him in the chest and end the possession before Rufel unleashes an electrical explosion.
| 105 | 105 | "Smiles, Tears"; Transliteration: "Egao Namida" (Japanese: 笑顔 涙) | Directed by : Fumio Maezono; Storyboarded by : Yukihiro Matsushita | Kazuyuki Fudeyasu | Hirokimi Shiratori & Itsuko Takeda | October 15, 2019 | February 16, 2020 |
Deep in his mind Luck has regressed to a childlike state and is distracted by hallucinations of his mother. Rufel plans to kill everybody, including himself and Luck. Asta tries to apologize for all the suffering Rufel endured and begs him to return to Luck. Luck finally hears his friends and decides to leave his mother behind and return to his friends. Rufel recalls that he once wanted to be friends with humans. As the spell breaks Rufel disappears and Luck finally wakes up. He is welcomed back by Magna before kicking him in the face, proving he is back to his normal self. Having realized that the elves are all suffering Asta decides to use his new sword's power to set the elves free. They head back to their base and find it is still in pieces after Henry transformed it and Asta introduces the others to him. They learn from Gordon and Grey that Gauche was possessed but left without hurting them. Before they can plan anything they are approached by the possessed Charmy, though they quickly realize she is actually just furious her vegetable garden is destroyed, and her elf facial tattoos are just sauce. As they are all out of magic Charmy has her sheep chefs force feed them to recover. With their magic returned Henry reconfigures the base into a bull-like vehicle, the Raging Black Bull Charging Style, and together the Black Bulls ride off to save the capital city.
| 106 | 106 | "Path of Revenge, Path of Atonement"; Transliteration: "Fukushū no Michi Tsugunai no Michi" (Japanese: 復讐の道 償いの道) | Directed by : Shigeki Awai; Storyboarded by : Shinji Ishihira | Kazuyuki Fudeyasu | Hiroshi Numata | October 22, 2019 | February 23, 2020 |
Luck senses three elves in a nearby town, Hecairo, one of whom has possessed Xerx Lügner, the Saint of Pure Ice. Vanessa, Grey, and Charmy save nearby citizens while Magna, Luck, and Gordon channel their magic through cannons which nearly overwhelms the elves. Asta fires himself through the cannons and nullifies the elves' possessions, returning Xerx and the others to normal. Elsewhere, Vangeance recalls his childhood, of always sensing Patry's traumatized soul, of being able to see Patry's memories, and then Patry fully awakening when Vangeance turned 16. Together they planned the elves' resurrection, culminating in the death of the Wizard King. With his heart broken at Julius' death, Vangeance falls asleep as Patry's own resurrection is completed. Patry leaves Vangeance's Grimoire behind as he goes to join Licht. Rades suddenly resurrects, his fury at being betrayed and murdered having caused his magic to go into overdrive, resurrecting himself, Sally, and Valtos. They teleport to Hecairo to enlist the Black Bull's aid in getting revenge, but rather than aid them in getting revenge Asta comically punishes Rades for his crimes and insists they focus on saving as many people as possible. Valtos decides to seek atonement for his sins while Sally agrees to stop hurting people and instead perform research that would benefit others. Rades finally agrees to help after realizing he is starving and being tempted by Charmy's food.
| 107 | 107 | "The Battle for Clover Castle"; Transliteration: "Kessen Kurōbā-jō" (Japanese: 決戦 クローバー城) | Directed by : Matsuo Asami; Storyboarded by : Yukihiro Matsushita | Jun Kamiya | Hiroshi Numata & Itsuko Takeda | October 29, 2019 | March 1, 2020 |
The elves possessing the Golden Dawn members, led by Langris, head for the three royal castles to kill the royal families. The King, furious over Langris' crimes, cancels the engagement between Langris and his royal great niece, Finnes Calmreich. Several elves fight the royal guards while Langris leads other elves to kill the royals. Finral arrives with Yami to fight the elves with the Green Praying Mantis captain, Jack the Ripper. They manage to knock the elves guarding the gates unconscious. Inside the castle of House Silva, the elves begin massacring the humans, royals and servants alike. Noelle's siblings, Solid and Nebra are attacked by an elf named Kivn. Nebra is impaled and incapacitated while Solid, still injured following his loss against Noelle, senses the floating dungeon approaching just behind Nozel, Noelle, and their comrades. Yami is proud to see that Zora is finally wearing his Black Bull robe. Yami, Jack, and Finral decide to find and protect the king. Nozel and Noelle try to save Solid and Nebra, but Kivn uses he Compass Magic to cat a spell distorts their magic, making it difficult to control their spells, and Nozel is wounded saving Solid. The Silva siblings are surprised to learn that Noelle, has struggled to control her magic all her life and forcing herself to train to control it, is now the only Silva sibling who can still fight effectively.
| 108 | 108 | "Battlefield Dancer"; Transliteration: "Senjō no Maihime" (Japanese: 戦場の舞姫) | Ayataka Tanemura | Jun Kamiya | Kosei Takahashi | November 5, 2019 | March 8, 2020 |
In a flashback, Acier Silva, the mother of Solid, Nebra, and Nozel, dies after Noelle is born, leading to Noelle being forced to join the Black Bulls while enduring mockery from Nebra and Solid. Back in the present, Noelle engulfs Kivn in water and Nozel seals her in mercury, forcing Kivn to cancel her spell. Professing his love for Noelle, Nozel reveals that he placed her in the Black Bulls, fearing that she would end up like her mother, and apologizes to her for his actions. Nozel is suddenly impaled as Kivn breaks free and recasts her magic distortion spell. Noelle, desperate to protect her family, unlocks a new spell, Valkyrie Armor, covering her in winged water armor and armed with a lance of spiraling water, identical to the steel armor worn by Acier. Noelle knocks out Kivn, but before she can help her siblings, she is surrounded by six other elves. Zora suddenly arrives with Paplo Espuma, a servant of House Silva who starts healing Noelle's siblings. Zora's trap magic easily knocks one elf unconscious. Remembering his promise to protect his siblings, Nozel seals his wounds with mercury and rejoins the battle. Zora realizes the elves, having been dead for centuries, have never experienced complicated modern spells like trap magic, and they are easily overwhelmed.
| 109 | 109 | "Spatial Mage Brothers"; Transliteration: "Kūkan Madōshi no Kyōdai" (Japanese: 空間魔導士の兄弟) | Directed by : Rokō Ogiwara; Storyboarded by : Masayuki Takahashi | Kanichi Katō | Yoon-Joung Kim | November 12, 2019 | March 15, 2020 |
The elf Baval, possessing Golden Dawn member David Swallow, threatens Kirsch, Mimosa, and En, pointing out the elves' power and the fact that Langris, possessed by the most twisted elf, Latry, has made it to the Clover King. The Clover King arrogantly declares he will defeat Langris with his royal magic but he is easily and embarrassingly defeated. Finnes is saved from Latry by Finral. Yami throws Finral's parents through a portal while Finral promises Finnes he will survive. Jack cuts through the castle wall, sending the King falling to safety. Jack figures out a way to cancel Latry’s automatic defense. Jack and Yami almost knock Latry unconscious but he goes on a rampage instead. Finral recalls he and Langris have never actually fought each other as Finral always ran away, and now Latry is distracted, Finral succeeds in teleporting him directly in front of him and Finral knocks him out with a simple punch to the face. Inside Langris' mind, he and Finral reconcile as they both pass out. Patry arrives at the floating dungeon and meets the elves Droit (who is possessing Gauche) and Eclat (who is possessing Marie). Rhya reveals that due to an unknown reason Licht's memories have not fully returned and he has once more fallen asleep. Patry reveals the final stage of his plan, to place a final magic stone in a tablet deep within the castle, wiping out all humans and making the elves' reincarnations permanent, a stone that is on Yuno's necklace.
| 110 | 110 | "The Raging Bull Joins the Showdown!!"; Transliteration: "Abare Ushi Chōjō Kessen Sansen!!" (Japanese: 暴れ牛 頂上決戦参戦!!) | Directed by : Fumio Maezono; Storyboarded by : Shinji Ishihira | Kanichi Katō | Hirokimi Shiratori | November 19, 2019 | March 22, 2020 |
Rhya reveals that he created new artificial bodies for Fana and Vetto to reincarnate into. The Apostles of Sephira, ten elves capable of receiving divine revelations, begin opening a door to the underworld, named the Shadow Palace, which was sealed under Clover Castle years ago by ancient elves and humans. Baval explains this will make the reincarnations permanent while the human souls will all be sent to the underworld. To protect the Apostles the remaining elves decide to kill everybody but are stopped by the timely arrival of Asta, the other Black Bulls, and the base, and most of the elves are completely overwhelmed. Patry determines Rouge poses the most danger and sends the elf Reve, possessing Dorothy Unsworth, Captain of the Coral Peacocks, to deal with her. Reve, using Dream Magic, casts a spell that teleports Vanessa, Rouge, Luck, Magna, Charmy, and Sally to an inescapable dream world, removing the Black Bulls most powerful defensive fighters. Droit and Patry destroy the base. Rades and Valtos chase after Patry while Henry loses control and starts draining everyone's magic. Noelle's armor disappears as her magic runs out. Yami and Jack chase the Apostles into the Shadow Palace. Eclat, using her Eye Magic, casts a spell that binds, paralyzes, and drains the magic of the remaining Black Bulls, but the spell is nullified by Asta. Droit identifies Asta's new sword as Licht's Demon-Destroyer Sword. The Black Bulls, despite being irritated by the real Gauche's personality, swear they will return him to normal.
| 111 | 111 | "The Eyes in the Mirror"; Transliteration: "Kagami no Naka no Hitomi" (Japanese: 鏡の中の瞳) | Directed by : Tsurumi Mukoyama; Storyboarded by : Tsurumi Mukoyama & Masayuki Takahashi | Kanichi Katō | Hiroshi Numata | November 26, 2019 | March 29, 2020 |
Within the dream world Reve confronts the Black Bulls, explaining that she has full control of the dream's reality. Vanessa is relieved to find Rouge can still use her magic to keep them alive. Sally uses her extensive magical knowledge to combine the Black Bull's magic into new attacks as well as working out exactly how Reve's magic functions. The Black Bulls become drowsy and Reve reveals that anyone trapped in her dream world for long periods will eventually fall asleep forever. Sally realizes that anything Reve imagines in the dream world will physically appear, even against her will. With this in mind, Sally tricks Reve into imagining and accidentally creating exits leading back to the real world. Meanwhile within the Shadow Palace, Yami and Jack become lost as they are manipulated by the elf Baval using Dice Magic to warp reality. Droit and Eclat try to kill Asta, but he is saved by Gordon, Grey, and Henry. Despite activating his Black Asta form, Asta is paralyzed by Eclat but is saved again when Henry transforms part of the base's rubble into a flying bull. As he is only alive because of the magic power he took from his friends Henry decides he will sacrifice all his remaining magic and even his life to keep Asta alive long enough to defeat Droit and Eclat.
| 112 | 112 | "Humans Who Can Be Trusted"; Transliteration: "Shinjirareru Ningen" (Japanese: 信じられる人間) | Directed by : Ryōhei Horiuchi; Storyboarded by : Yukihiro Matsushita | Kanichi Katō | Hiroshi Numata | December 3, 2019 | April 5, 2020 |
Reve prevents the exit doors from opening with chains. Luck suggests making Reve defeat herself by creating a doll that resembles Reve's human body, tricking her into thinking about and summoning a non-possessed version of Captain Dorothy Unsworth. Dorothy, who is normally asleep, turns out to be hyperactively cheerful within the Dream World. Dorothy's Dream Magic proves to be on par with her elven counterpart. Meanwhile, Asta finds it impossible to attack Droit while avoiding his lasers and Eclat's paralyzing eyes. Henry throws himself at Droit and Eclat, draining their magic while sacrificing himself. Asta urges him to live and Henry realizes he wants to live. He is saved by his friends while Asta manages to attack Droit. Droit recalls that when the elves were being murdered human royals used a magic item to steal their magic for themselves as well Tetia for conceiving a half-elf child despite being a royal herself, and yet he realizes Asta and the Black Bulls are nothing like the ancient humans and decides to allow Asta to nullify his and Eclat's reincarnations. As Gauche awakes he berates the Black Bulls for risking themselves for him when he only ever cared about Marie and not them, though the Black Bulls insist they consider him a friend anyway. Reve's Dream World begins to collapse from the magic of Reve and Dorothy colliding inside it. Dorothy disappears but urges Reve to consider that good humans exist, especially the Black Bulls. As the Dream World collapses everyone reappears in the normal world and Asta nullifies Reve's reincarnation. With all the Black Bulls back together Asta declares it is time to find Captain Yami.
Shadow Palace Arc
| 113 | 113 | "Storming the Shadow Palace"; Transliteration: "Totsunyū Kage no Ōkyū" (Japanese: 突入 影の王宮) | Directed by : Shigehisa Iida; Storyboarded by : Shinji Ishihira & Shigehisa Iida | Kazuyuki Fudeyasu | Hirokimi Shiratori & Hiroshi Numata | December 10, 2019 | April 19, 2020 (Note: Adult Swim showed a Dragon Ball Z Kai marathon on April 11–12, 2020) |
Gueldre Poizot and Revchi are tempted to sneak inside the Shadow Palace to see if there are magic items worth stealing. Charmy and Mimosa help everyone recover with food and recovery magic. Noelle and Mimosa become jealous of Sally's new closeness to Asta. Two elves try a sneak attack while everyone is distracted but are instantly caught by Fuegoleon and Mereoleona. Magna notices the entrance portal starting to shrink while more possessed Golden Dawn members arrive. The Black Bulls decide to fight the elves, relying on Charmy and Vanessa to keep them alive, while all the captains, Asta, Noelle, and Mimosa enter the palace. Solid wakes up in time to acknowledge Noelle's strength and that he wants her to survive so he can one day surpass her. Inside the palace everyone ends up magically separated and Mimosa ends up alone with Asta. Mimosa determines that the elves are spread throughout the palace, as are the captains, and they will all need to defeat at least one Apostle of Sephira to reach Patry and Licht. Asta and Mimosa confront the elf Lira, possessing Rill. Noelle is confronted by Fana, Mereoleona by Vetto, and Fuegoleon by the Purple Orca's new captain, Kaizer Granvorka. As Fuegoleon contends with the possessed Kaizer's Vortex Magic and Mereoleona fights evenly with Vetto, the two siblings reminisce of their childhood together. Through sheer determination both Mereoleona and Fuegoleon manage to land the same powerful flame attack on both of their opponents.
| 114 | 114 | "The Final Invaders"; Transliteration: "Saigo no Nyūjō-sha" (Japanese: 最後の入城者) | Directed by : Akira Shimizu; Storyboarded by : Masayuki Takahashi & Shinji Ishihira | Kazuyuki Fudeyasu | Keizō Shimizu | December 17, 2019 | April 26, 2020 |
Noelle fights Fana, destroying her upper body, but Fana recovers using forbidden magic. Asta struggles to get past the paint monsters to reach Lira and is injured, requiring Mimosa to heal him. The Black Bulls struggle against the Golden Dawn elves, until Yuno suddenly arrives; having gathered unpossessed knights from all over the kingdom. The elves are all rendered unconscious while Yuno's necklace reopens the entrance, though only Yuno, Sylph, and Charmy make it inside while Nero is left behind. Charmy ends up with Asta and Mimosa but when she sees Lira upset she tries to offer him food, only for Lira to destroy it and knock her unconscious. Asta rushes to help her, only for Charmy to begin emitting strange magic. Her giant sheep transforms into a giant wolf while Charmy transforms into a more adult version of herself. Lira realizes Charmy is actually a human-dwarf hybrid, which Charmy was completely unaware of, and her dual heritage has given her two magic attributes, Cotton Magic and Food Magic. The wolf begins devouring the paintings, absorbing Lira's magic while Charmy uses supercharged punches to keep Lira busy, allowing Asta and Mimosa to run ahead. Noelle receives help from Jack. Yuno ends up alone against Rhya, Patry, and another elf, Ronne, who manages to steal Yuno's necklace. Rhya realizes Ronne is not himself, right before Ronne blasts a hole through Rhya's body.
| 115 | 115 | "Mastermind"; Transliteration: "Kuromaku" (Japanese: 黒幕) | Directed by : Rokō Ogiwara; Storyboarded by : Taisuke Mori | Jun Kamiya | Yoon-Joung Kim & Hiroshi Numata | December 24, 2019 | May 3, 2020 |
Rhya has a flashback to the massacre. Rhya had allowed the elves to believe they were betrayed by Lumiere, the brother of Licht's human wife, Tetia, when in fact Rhya knew Lumiere was innocent but hid the truth so the elves would continue to hate humans. Ronne places the stone in the altar, revealing he was actually possessed by a Devil that now rises from the Underworld. He reveals to Patry that he was the one who convinced the ancient humans to massacre the elves. Yuno saves Rhya and Patry but his magic is useless against the devil that can use Word Soul Magic, meaning anything he says becomes reality. Asta and Mimosa arrive and while Asta and Yuno try to fight together they fail. The devil begins tormenting Patry, revealing he was the one who cast the forbidden spell to resurrect the elves, not Licht, and the war between humans and the Eye of the Midnight Sun was all part of his plan to regain his original body, sending Patry into despair. Disgusted by the devil's actions, Asta's and Yuno's power increase, the former's Black form now coating half his torso and the latter's Spirit Dive covering his entire left side with green mana. Rhya realizes the soul residing in Yuno's body is Licht's unborn half-human child. Asta and Yuno succeed in wounding the devil, but he heals instantly. He further reveals that when the owner of a four leaf Grimoire is filled with despair, as Patry now is, it transforms into a five leaf Grimoire. His first attempt created Asta's Grimoire five centuries ago, but he was prevented from claiming it for himself, but now with Patry's five leaf Grimoire in his possession he has the power to rule the world. Now filled with ultimate despair Patry transforms into a dark elf and randomly begins attacking everyone with his corrupted Demon Light Magic. The devil departs leaving Patry to kill everyone for him as the dark elf prepares his Light Shaft of Divine Punisment.
| 116 | 116 | "The Ultimate Natural Enemy"; Transliteration: "Saikyō no Tenteki" (Japanese: 最強の天敵) | Directed by : Fumio Maezono; Storyboarded by : Tsurumi Mukoyama, Yoshihiro Sugai & Yūsuke Onoda | Jun Kamiya | Hirokimi Shiratori | January 7, 2020 | May 10, 2020 |
Asta and Yuno manage to deflect Patry's spell but Asta loses his Black form. Patry unleashs a second Light Shaft of Divine Punisment, but Asta and Yuno are saved by Nozel who wants revenge against Patry for destroying Fuegoleon's arm. Nozel easily uses the reflective surface of his mercury to deflect Patry's Demon Light Magic and traps him. Nozel informs Asta he plans on becoming his rival to become Wizard King. Rhya almost dies until he is saved by Mimosa, though this only annoys him. Nozel plans to execute Patry until Yuno points out Patry is possessing Captain Vangeance's human body. Asta tries to nullify the possession and is instead sucked into Patry's memories, where he learns about the death of the Wizard King. Asta reaches the real Patry, and despite hating him for killing Julius, he berates him for giving up on himself, even though Asta hasn't yet given up on the elves. Patry realizes Asta is just like Lumiere and lets go of his hate, turning from a dark elf into his normal self, promising to return Vangeance after the devil is defeated. As the devil tries to escape he is confronted by Licht with his Demon-Dweller Sword, but Licht is overwhelmed and is saved by Charla, possessing Captain Charlotte's body. Yami arrives and teams up with them to fight the devil who is surprised a human so easily cooperates with elves. Elsewhere Finral is woken up by Nero who demands to be taken to the bones of the dead demon, revealing that they can speak.
| 117 | 117 | "Breaking the Seal"; Transliteration: "Ima Fū o Kiru Toki" (Japanese: 今封を切る時) | Directed by : Yoshihisa Matsumoto; Storyboarded by : Takashi Iida | Jun Kamiya | Hiroshi Numata | January 14, 2020 | May 17, 2020 |
As Yami, Charla and Licht battle the devil, the former two notes that while his Word Soul Magic can create and control both magical and physical objects, he cannot be use it to outright command them to die and has a limited area of influence over other spells, as well as the devil also actively avoid Yami's Dark Magic attacks. The devil summons a shapeless mass of magic from his world. Finral teleports Nero to the bones and removes the magic stones from Patry's stone tablet and places them in the First Wizard King's statue atop the skull, causing the statue to crack. The mass proves capable of draining magic and life force from its victims, and the Devil plans to unleash it on the world. While saving Rhya and Mimosa, Asta is swallowed by the mass, only to discover his Anti-Magic makes him immune. Nozel orders Asta, Yuno and Patry to assist Yami while he takes Mimosa elsewhere. As the statue crumbles it transforms back into the first Wizard King, Lumiere Silvamilllion Clover, while Nero also transforms into her original self, Secre Swallowtail. Lumiere and Secre instantly travel into the Shadow Palace. Secre has a flashback to 500 years ago when she was Lumiere's servant. He would spend his time creating magic tools with the aid of Secre's Sealing Magic and promoting the idea of a more equal society. But on the day of his sister's wedding to Licht he was captured by the devil who manipulated his family into murdering the elves. Lumiere escaped but was too late to prevent the massacre and the devil succeeded in creating the original fiveleaf Grimoire that would one day belong to Asta. He then tried to possess Licht but Licht used forbidden magic and transformed himself into the giant demon before asking Lumiere to kill him.
| 118 | 118 | "A Reunion Across Time and Space"; Transliteration: "Jikū o Koeta Saikai" (Japanese: 時空を超えた再会) | Isuta & Ayataka Tanemura | Kanichi Katō | Kosei Takahashi | January 21, 2020 | May 24, 2020 |
Lumiere honors Licht's request to kill him as he summons a giant light sword and reduces his friend's monstrous body to a skeleton. Secre retrieves the magic stones and stops the devil from taking Licht's Grimoire while attempting to seal him, only for the devil to cast the resurrection spell to send himself and the elves five centuries into the future. Secre then petrifies the near dead Lumiere at his request and is turned into an Anti-bird for using forbidden magic. She then spends the next five centuries watching over Licht's Grimoire until Asta acquired it. In the present, Asta, Yuno and Patry catch up to the devil at the same time as Lumiere and Secre arrive, with Licht's soul fully awakened by their presence. As everyone teams up to fight, the devil realizes Licht and Lumiere have become stronger due to being affected by his magic in the past while Asta's Anti-Magic can stop his attacks. The devil reveals his magic mass will continue to grow as long as he is alive, so Licht casts a spell, using the power of all the remaining elves to unlock the Demon-Dweller Sword's true potential to obliterate him. Unfortunately the devil's heart survives as he regenerates, revealing that no magic from their dimension can kill him. Asta realizes the Demon-Slayer Sword must also have an ultimate power and that he must unlock it using a power no one else has.
| 119 | 119 | "The Final Attack"; Transliteration: "Owari no Ichigeki" (Japanese: 終わりの一撃) | Directed by : Rokō Ogiwara; Storyboarded by : Taisuke Mori, Ayataka Tanemura & Tatsuya Yoshihara | Kazuyuki Fudeyasu | Hiroshi Numata | January 28, 2020 | May 31, 2020 |
Yami and Charlotte survive the mass while Yami saves enough magic for one last Dimension Slash. Secre realizes that while the devil created Asta's Grimoire, it was another devil who gave it Anti-magic. Yuno manages to gather the remains of Lumiere and Licht's magic to forge the Spirit of Zephyr, a air mana sword capable of hurting him while Asta manages to overfill his sword with Anti-Magic, turning it into the Anti-Magic Demon-Slayer Sword, Black Divider. Lumiere is highly impressed with both of them. Working together Asta manages to stab the devil's heart, only for it to reappear undamaged. Enraged, he summons even more mass. Lumiere and Licht decide they must let Asta and Yuno fight the devil while they use the Demon-Dweller Sword to cast a spell to protect everyone in the dungeon from the mass. Secre thinks about how she originally only got close to Asta because he obtained Licht's five-leaf grimoire but after observing him and seeing all he'd accomplished, she'd come to truly believe in him. Even though they are an impossible distance away Yami decides to aim his Dimension Slash at the devil using only ki detection. Asta and Yuno both stab him, but Asta finally runs out of Anti-Magic. The devil prepares to kill them both but Yami casts his largest Dimension Slash: Equinox, and cuts the devil in half. Secre uses her Sealing Magic to help Asta recover, and as she flashes back through all the enemies she has watched him defeat through sheer willpower, she declares he will become the next Wizard King. Spurred on by her faith, Asta resummons his Anti-Magic and with Yuno giving him an opening, he finally cuts the devil's heart in half.
| 120 | 120 | "Dawn"; Transliteration: "Yoake" (Japanese: 夜明け) | Directed by : Toshihiro Maeya; Storyboarded by : Hirotsugu Kawasaki | Jun Kamiya | Keizō Shimizu | February 4, 2020 | June 7, 2020 |
As the devil dies, he is confronted by the devil within Asta's Grimoire who gloats at his victory. The mass begins to consume the Shadow Palace but everyone is saved by Rades and Valtos and escapes through portals, only to find the remaining elves still attacking the city. Patry reveals they can defeat them using Vangeance's World Tree Magic. Asta nullifies his reincarnation, waking Vangeance who is grateful Patry is no longer suffering. He combines his World Tree Magic with Licht, connecting the elves' souls to the tree. Asta then strikes the tree with his sword, ending all the reincarnations and allowing their souls to pass on, except for Vetto, Rhya, and Fana who now possess artificial bodies and decide instead to live their new lives to the fullest. Yuno realizes the elf possessing him was Licht and Tetia's unborn son, and Licht thanks Yuno for allowing him to meet him, while also acknowledging Asta as the new owner of his grimoire and swords. A furious Rades captures Patry's soul and reanimates it back into Licht's cloned body, demanding he stay and atone for all the people he killed, to which Patry agrees. William asks Yami to take him to the Wizard King's body. Asta introduces everyone to Lumiere and Secre, explaining who they are having already deduce Secre was Nero. Lumiere is happy the ideal world he worked for is finally becoming reality. Lumiere finally runs out of magic and his stone body begins to crumble. As he passes away he asks Secre to continue looking after the Kingdom and to live her own life from now on. In a post-credits scene, a resurrected younger-looking Julius reveals himself to Yami and William, shocking the both of them.
| 121 | 121 | "Three Problems"; Transliteration: "Mitsu no Komatta Koto" (Japanese: 3つの困ったこと) | Directed by : Matsuo Asami; Storyboarded by : Yukihiro Matsushita | Kanichi Katō | Kyung Hwan Kim & Hiroshi Numata | February 11, 2020 | June 14, 2020 |
Yami and William find the Wizard King alive due to 13 years stored in a magic tool in case he was ever killed, rendering his body of a 13 year old. Julius orders William to help with the recovery effort. Julius reveals to Yami, Asta, Mimosa, Noelle, and Secre that his younger body has far less magic, meaning he has less influence over the selfish nobles and will be unable to protect the kingdom from attack. He also worries Asta may die; as his power is demonic and since it was a devil who attacked the kingdom, the Magic Parliament will probably blame Asta then execute him. Secre confirms that Asta's Black form as well as the horns on her head, know as weg, could be used as evidence they had contact with devils. Mimosa explains the Magic Parliament are royals and nobles who create laws and preside over trials for serious crimes. Meanwhile the Clover King credits Sekke for saving him, despite it being an accident. They are attacked by anti-royalists hoping to assassinate the king amid the confusion, but they are saved by Damnatio Kira, Chairman of the Magic Parliament. Asta and Secre are asked to testify before the Parliament, but when they arrive they are arrested by Damnatio who demands evidence of the devil behind the attack. When Asta can provide none Damnatio decides to simply charge the people possessed by the elves as normal criminals. Damnatio brings in Marie, Gauche's sister, and orders her immediately executed for her actions during the battle, forcing Asta to assume his Black form to save her, revealing himself to the entire Parliament, just as Damnatio wanted him to.
| 122 | 122 | "As Pitch Black as It Gets"; Transliteration: "Makkurokekke" (Japanese: 真っ黒けっけ) | Directed by : Matsuo Asami; Storyboarded by : Masayuki Takahashi | Kazuyuki Fudeyasu | Hirokimi Shiratori & Itsuko Takeda | February 18, 2020 | June 21, 2020 |
The Magic Parliament demand Asta's execution. Damnatio threatens Marie, Father Orsi, Sister Lily and the church orphans unless Asta surrenders. The Parliament is suddenly destroyed by Henry’s Raging Black Bull, and every member of the Black Bulls' demand Asta be set free, or they will go to war with the Parliament. Secre tells them to take Asta and leave her, but Yami refuses, claiming she is a full team member, and gives her a Black Bulls robe. Damnatio uses his Scale Magic to shrink the Black Bulls' spells, but Asta easily nullifies it with the Demon-Destroyer Sword. Yami tries to defeat Damnatio but is stopped by Fuegoleon and Nozel, who announce their support of Asta, shocking the Parliament. Fuegoleon reveals the Wizard King has ordered the Black Bulls to investigate the devil race to prove Asta's innocence. With so much influential support Damnatio is forced to give in, but warns Asta he will still be executed if he fails. For appearance's sake, Nozel places a spell on Asta to track his position at all times. Damnatio visits Julius, already knowing about his reduced power, and is advised to trust the Black Bulls. Damnatio warns Julius if the devil crisis gets any worse or the kingdom is invaded, he may have to pass judgement on Julius as well. After Damnatio leaves a tearful Marx forces a disbelieving Julius to begin the paperwork required to begin returning the kingdom to normal.
| 123 | 123 | "Nero Reminisces... Part One"; Transliteration: "Nero: Tsuikai Soshite... Zenpen" (Japanese: ネロ、追懐そして…前編) | Directed by : Rokō Ogiwara; Storyboarded by : Taisuke Mori | Kazuyuki Fudeyasu | Nami Hayashi | February 25, 2020 | June 28, 2020 |
As the Black Bulls leave the kingdom to begin investigating the mystery of demons and clearing Asta's name, Secre reflects on her past. Together with Lumiere they created the first magic tools, met Licht, and realized they both possessed four-leaf Grimoires. She watched them become best friends and then family by Licht marrying Tetia, and saw how close he and Licht came to creating an equal society, until the Word Soul Devil came. He manipulated the humans, using the jealousy and greed of the royals and nobles to bring about the massacre. During the massacre Lumiere realized the elves were murdered with his Light Magic, stored in a magic tool he and Secre created and made stronger by the elves magic stones, all to create a five-leaf Grimoire while Lumiere was forced to kill Licht when he transformed into the giant demon. Secre then managed to seal the devil before he could claim the five-leaf Grimoire and saved Lumiere from death by sealing him in a statue, all at the cost of being transformed into an Anti-bird for using forbidden magic. Eventually she found something to hope for when she sensed a power that could one day defeat the devil, the day Asta and Yuno were left at the orphanage.
| 124 | 124 | "Nero Reminisces... Part Two"; Transliteration: "Nero: Tsuikai Soshite... Kōhen" (Japanese: ネロ、追懐そして…後編) | Directed by : Ryōhei Horiuchi; Storyboarded by : Taisuke Mori | Kazuyuki Fudeyasu | Nami Hayashi | March 3, 2020 | July 12, 2020 (Note: Adult Swim showed a Dragon Ball Super marathon on July 4–5, 2020) |
Secre continues to reminisce. She watched Asta and Yuno grow up while at the same time Patry was reincarnated into William Vangeance, not knowing this was the Word Soul devil's plan all along. Secre watched as Asta was given the five-leaf Grimoire and was surprised to learn that the devil residing within it was different from the one 500 years ago and that it chose to help Asta. Over time she saw the Eye of the Midnight Sun attack many places searching for the magic stones, including the Underwater Temple and the Capital City and finally the resurrection of the elves. She witnessed the Apostles of Sephira open the Shadow Palace, hoping to make their resurrections permanent, but instead summoning the Word Soul devil, who revealed he cast the resurrection spell to create another five-leaf Grimoire. With the devil's returned, Secre was able to transform back into a human and free Lumiere from the statue, resulting in the Black Bulls and the other magic knights and captains battling him until he was eventually killed by Asta. In the end, she was able to say goodbye to Lumiere and begin a new life, only this time she would not be alone, she has her new friends the Black Bulls. Note: Due to the COVID-19 pandemic, Funimation started adding a disclaimer note before episode broadcasts on Adult Swim. The disclaimer states that the English dub voice actors were able to record their lines from the safety of their homes.
| 125 | 125 | "Return"; Transliteration: "Kikan" (Japanese: 帰還) | Directed by : Akira Shimizu; Storyboarded by : Yukihiro Matsushita | Kanichi Katō | Keizō Shimizu | March 10, 2020 | July 19, 2020 |
The Black Bulls finally return home, only problem is, Henry can't reconstruct the base as he has forgotten what it looks like, so everyone writes requests for their new rooms. Yami reminds everyone of his three dangerous magical beasts he keeps as pets escaped when the base was destroyed. Noelle becomes jealous and confused at seeing Asta with Secre, unsure if they are actually friends or not. Magna and Luck get in another fight. Gauche, Grey, and Gordon find the beasts but all three of them are attacked. The beasts also attack Finral, Charmy, and Vanessa who got distracted by wine and food. Magna and Luck are attacked after exhausting their magic fighting each other. Yami is disturbed on the toilet by the beasts who, it turns out, just missed him. Yami remembers they always were needy, since he found them as babies after their parents were hunted by bored nobles. The other Black Bulls are revealed to be okay as they were simply exhausted from playing with the beast when they found them, as they love the other members as much as Yami (save for Asta who they still see as food). With the beasts re-established as Yami's pets, Henry completes the new base, including a wine fountain for Vanessa, a large kitchen for Charmy and one giant communal bedroom per Gordon's request, which everyone else rejects. Per the beast's request, Yami's bedroom is moved into their cage. In the end Henry reconstructs the base exactly as it used to be so they can begin researching the devils and prove Asta’s innocence.
| 126 | 126 | "The Blue Rose's Confession"; Transliteration: "Aobara no Kokuhaku" (Japanese: 碧薔薇の告白) | Tsurumi Mukoyama | Kazuyuki Fudeyasu | Nami Hayashi & Hiroshi Numata | March 17, 2020 | July 26, 2020 (Note: Due to special scheduling coinciding with Adult Swim's virtual convention, Black Clover was moved back 20 minutes from its usual 1:30 a.m. EDT/PDT timeslot (1:50 a.m. EDT/PDT) on the night of July 25–26, 2020. It returned to the timeslot the following week.) |
Yami decides to research the Weg curse that caused Asta and Secre to grow black horns. In the capital, Captain Charlotte is embarrassed at the memories she has of the elf that possessed her talking with Yami, then when Yami suddenly appears in her hospital room. Yami tries to ask Charlotte about her own curse, but she is so overwhelmed she has a breakdown and runs mad throughout the city. Hours later she calms down and recalls Yami helping her break her curse. She gathers the Blue Rose Knights, an all-female squad who refuses to rely on men, and admits she loves Yami and is stepping down as Captain. However, she is shocked when her knights declare they will support her since most of them have secret boyfriends anyway. Charlotte nervously agrees to tell Yami how she feels, just as he arrives with Asta and Secre. Yami believes Charlotte hates him since she ran away, making the knights think he is an oblivious idiot. Asta, in his usual blunt manner, reveals Charlotte must actually like him a lot to trust him so much, causing Sol to strangle him. Charlotte invites Yami to dinner, however at dinner Yami is too oblivious to realize it is supposed to be a date and continues asking about her curse. Despite being disappointed Charlotte explains her family was cursed by a mage so that when she turned 18 her soul and magic both changed form, a curse that likely came from the world of devils. She then reminds Yami that he has someone in the Black Bulls already familiar with curses, Gordon Agrippa.
| 127 | 127 | "Clues"; Transliteration: "Tegakari" (Japanese: 手掛かり) | Directed by : Fumio Maezono; Storyboarded by : Yoriyasu Kogawa | Kanichi Katō | Hirokimi Shiratori | March 24, 2020 | August 2, 2020 |
Gordon visits his family with Asta, Secre, Gauche, and Grey. For generations, Gordon's family would curse people for money, but Gordon joined the Black Bulls instead. Asta is shocked to learn Gordon's parents, Nathan and Jonna, grandmother Nilenia and sister Roxanne all look and speak exactly as Gordon does. The senile Nilenia mentions an ancestral contract called Curse of Megicula, upsetting Roxanne. Gordon asks Nathan about devils, and he agrees to explain, but asks Gordon to use his Poison Magic in their research. When Gordon refuses Nathan seemingly poisons Asta, only to reveal he took their ancestors death research and repurposed it into healing and medical advancement, which Gordon was unaware of. Elsewhere Noelle visits Captain Dorothy and demands to know how her mother really died after Nozel admitted it was not Noelle’s birth that killed her. For safety's sake Dorothy takes Noelle to her dream world so they can talk freely. Dorothy explains Acier died as the result of a devil's curse, but anyone who talks about the curse will be inflicted by the same curse and die, hence why Nozel kept it a secret, even from Solid and Nebra. She further explains that the devil who cursed Acier was called Megicula. Nathan shows Asta a cursed map showing the devil curses currently active within the kingdom, including one at the Black Bulls hideout, which they assume to be Henry. Another powerful one is in the capital but the most powerful is far away in the Heart Kingdom.
Heart Kingdom Training Arc
| 128 | 128 | "To the Heart Kingdom!"; Transliteration: "Hāto Ōkoku e!" (Japanese: ハート王国へ!) | Ayataka Tanemura | Kunihiko Okada | Hiroshi Numata & Kosei Takahashi | March 31, 2020 | August 9, 2020 |
Yami learns the Heart Kingdoms can only be visited with an invitation. Finral visits Langris, who is surprised Finral is determined to improve himself and take Finnes Calmreich as his wife, though Langris believes Finral is incapable of making Finnes happy due to his brother's habit of flirting with women and challenges Finral to become a better man. Mimosa reveals the Heart Kingdom is rich in natural mana, ruled by a Queen as powerful as a knight squad. Mimosa acquires invitations to the Heart Kingdom for herself, Asta, Noelle and Finral, with Secre hiding in her bird form. As they enter the Heart Kingdom it is revealed the Queen plans to seize Asta's devil power for herself. Gaja, a Spirit Guardian, directs them to the palace via a river that flows uphill, thanks to the Queen's Water Magic and Mana Zone, which is so large it covers the whole kingdom. Gaja explains every queen for 1200 years has made a pact with Undine, the Spirit of Water. Asta is suddenly kidnapped, while the others are forced to battle Gaja, who is vastly more skilled with his Lighting Magic. Asta is deposited in the palace where his Black form impresses Undine. She reveals the Heart Kingdom measures magical strength in Stages and Asta barely ranks 9th Stage, the weakest, while Finral and Mimosa rank 3rd Stage, Noelle rank 1st Stage, and it is suggested Gaja ranks even higher Zero Stage. However, working together, Noelle, Mimosa and Finral manage to land a powerful attack on Gaja, while Secre manages to free Asta from Undine and he attacks a nearby ki presence, assuming it to be the Queen.
| 129 | 129 | "Devil Megicula"; Transliteration: "Akuma Megikyura" (Japanese: 悪魔メギキュラ) | Directed by : Toshiaki Kanbara; Storyboarded by : Takashi Iida | Mio Inoue | Itsuko Takeda | April 7, 2020 | August 30, 2020 (Note: Adult Swim showed four animated Batman films in partnership with DC FanDome on August 15–16 and August 22–23, 2020) |
The ki turns out to be a decoy for the real Queen, Loropechika, a clumsy, absent-minded young woman. Gaja is impressed with Noelle, Mimosa, and Finral and introduces them to Loropechika, who reveals she was cursed by Megicula and will die in a year. Undine explains they want Asta and the others to help defeat Megicula, who is in the Spade kingdom, as Loropechika inherited the power of all previous Heart Queens and is too precious to die so young. Vanessa, Magna, and Luck scout the Diamond Kingdom's border and witness a Spade knight defeat a Diamond army, which even scares Luck. Loropechika explains Heart mages are limited to natural magic like water and are incapable of truly killing a devil, whereas Clover mages invented unnatural magic, such as Spatial and Time magic, and certain mages born in such an unnatural environment can kill devils, such as Yami, Asta, and Secre, who Loropechika classes in the Arcane Stage, above Stage Zero. Mimosa contacts Julius and he agrees the Clover Kingdom will help. Loropechika reveals that Megicula is more powerful than the devil that revived the elves, because they are siphoning power from Spade citizens, preparing to invade all the kingdoms, thus Loropechika is planning to invade the Spade Kingdom before she dies and asks Asta and his friends to grow stronger and gather other Arcane mages for the invasion in 6 months. They explain the situation to Yami who deduces the Spade knight must have been possessed by Megicula. Yami orders every Bull to train for the entire 6 months and become at least as strong as a Squad Vice Captain in preparation for war.
| 130 | 130 | "The New Magic Knight Captain Conference"; Transliteration: "Shin Mahō Kishi-dan Danchō Kaigi" (Japanese: 新・魔法騎士団団長会議) | Directed by : Matsuo Asami; Storyboarded by : Yukihiro Matsushita | Kazuyuki Fudeyasu | Kyung Hwan Kim & Hiroshi Numata | April 14, 2020 | September 6, 2020 |
With the repairs to the capital city going well the Captains gather for a celebration. Rill is revealed to have fallen in love with Charmy's mature form and keeps daydreaming. To hide his child like appearance from the citizens, and especially the King, Julius has Owen masquerade as him with his face hidden by bandages. The Clover King attempts to take credit for winning the battle, but is knocked over when Yami and Jack start a fight. After the king angrily leaves the Captains hold a meeting where Julius and the Black Bulls explain the situation with Megicula, the Spade Kingdom and Loropechika's plans for war and orders them to train their squad members for the next six months. Several captains attempt to quit out of guilt for attacking the kingdom while possessed but Julius refuses to let them. Damnatio agrees to wait until after the war to decide what to do with Asta. Julius brings in former Purple Orca's captain Gueldre and explains that since the city repairs are so expensive he is pardoning Gueldre's crimes in exchange for his ability to make a profit. He also cuts the captains salaries in half, which most agree to, except a horrified Jack and Yami who get drunk and attempt to recoup the loss by playing poker against Vangeance, only to lose their entire salaries when he easily beats them.
| 131 | 131 | "A New Resolve"; Transliteration: "Aratanaru Ketsui" (Japanese: 新たなる決意) | Directed by : Matsuo Asami; Storyboarded by : Shigehisa Iida | Jun Kamiya | Hirokimi Shiratori | April 21, 2020 | September 13, 2020 |
Asta visits the orphanage with Noelle, Secre and Yuno. Asta is relieved to find no one in the village believes he is in league with a devil. Father Orsi reveals Hage finally has its own magic school. Secre visits the demon skull to pay her respects to Lumiel and hears someone training in Asta's old training area. Asta instantly proposes marriage to Sister Lily, only to be crushed into the ground by her magic. Hearing Asta yelling about marriage causes Noelle to fall off her broom onto Asta's head, then when she learns Asta routinely mentions her in the letters he sends to Lily and Orsi, she punishes him. Lily asks Asta and Yuno to teach a class for the youngest children, believing learning from actual magic knights will be a great inspiration. Asta inspires the boys into joining him on a workout, leaving Yuno, Noelle, and Secre with the girls to play house. Later, Orsi introduces them to the older students preparing to receive their Grimoire’s, and they are surprised to find the instructors are the two noble boys who tried to steal Yuno’s Grimoire the day he received it but have now turned over a new leaf. The child training in the skull is revealed to be Nash, who is inspired by Asta. Noelle continues to obsess over how Asta described her in his letters. Asta and Yuno reminisce about how far they have come and decide to keep growing stronger to face Megicula and the Spade Kingdom.
| 132 | 132 | "The Lion Awakens"; Transliteration: "Mezameru Shishi" (Japanese: 目覚める獅子) | Directed by : Rokō Ogiwara; Storyboarded by : Yukihiro Matsushita | Kanichi Katō | Hiroshi Numata | April 28, 2020 | September 20, 2020 |
Mereoleona kidnaps Asta, Noelle, Secre, Magna, Luck, Charmy and Gordon to the Crimson Lions training area, Yultim Volcano. However, instead of the hot spring at the summit, they head for the even better hot spring in the cave under the volcano where heat is so intense they will die instantly if their protective Mana Skin fails. As most of the Black Bulls are unfamiliar with Mana Skin Fuegoleon uses a magic tool to make Mana Skin easier, though death is still a possibility. Asta however uses his Anti-Magic. Asta rushes ahead with Leopold while Luck and Magna head for the strongest cave monster, a giant spider. Noelle races ahead of Asta using her water armor, but when she sees Asta chasing her from behind she imagines them in a romantic beach setting and punishes Asta with a water blast, becoming lost in the steam and wandering into the spider's lair. Asta and Leopold save Noelle but the spider escapes. Mereoleona admits the spider is an intruder but as it is scared of her it always escapes before she can find it, so she used the Black Bulls as bait, also teaching them the importance of expecting the unexpected. She then reveals that having finally seen the spider herself, it is actually a man-made mutant. Fuegoleon uses Salamander to expose a doorway behind a rock wall, revealing the spider is actually guarding the entrance to a previously unidentified dungeon.
| 133 | 133 | "The Lion Awakens, Continued"; Transliteration: "Zoku Mezameru Shishi" (Japanese: 続・目覚める獅子) | Directed by : Toshihiro Maeya; Storyboarded by : Takashi Iida | Kanichi Katō | Keizō Shimizu | July 7, 2020 | September 27, 2020 |
The Wizard King informs them the dungeon contains a powerful magic item. Asta, Noelle, Magna, Luck, Secre, Leo, and Randall enter first while the rest recover their magic. The dungeon splits into three paths so they split into teams. Asta and Noelle are almost buried in lava and flee with Asta carrying Noelle like a princess. Luck and Magna find legged treasure chests but nothing else. Leo and Randall locate the spider which can control stone golems. Everyone catches up to Leo and Randall to help, but Leo instinctively unlocks an ability to greatly increase his power temporarily. The spider is defeated and the treasure room revealed. Secre finds the magic item had been inside the spider, really a normal spider turned into a monster by the item. Leo swears to master his new ability. Mereoleona punishes Asta and Leo for damaging the item by forcing them to search the entire dungeon alone to ensure nothing is left behind, while everyone else relaxes in the hot spring. Noelle decides to ask Mereoleona for more information about her mother. Returning to the Black Bulls base hoping to recover they discover Mereoleona is already there with a new mission.
| 134 | 134 | "Those Who Have Been Gathered"; Transliteration: "Atsumerareta Monotachi" (Japanese: 集められた者たち) | Directed by : Shigeo Koshi; Storyboarded by : Yukihiro Matsushita | Kunihiko Okada | Hiroshi Numata | July 14, 2020 | October 4, 2020 |
Mereoleona kidnaps Asta, Noelle, and Secre to her home, Vermillion House, for a party along with Mimosa, Kirsch, and Fuegoleon, to celebrate the fifteenth anniversary of Sister Theresa Rapaul becoming a Nun since she also taught Fuegoleon and Mereoleona. Theresa also brings along her orphans, including Marie, though Theresa exposes one of the children as Gauche magically disguised so he could secretly visit Marie. Fuegoleon demands party tricks from everyone to amuse Theresa and the children and Noelle goes first, after Mereoleona suggests it was what Acier would have done. The children declare Fuegoleon's tricks boring and Mereoleona's scary so Theresa shares embarrassing memories of Fuegoleon and Mereoleona's childhoods instead, causing them to fight. Mimosa duels Kirsch to settle their own childhood grievances while Gauche joins the brawl to protect Marie. Theresa stops the fight, proving that despite her advanced age she can still discipline both Fuegoleon and Mereoleona when they get out of hand, impressing Asta and Noelle. She also disciplines Gauche for trying to see Marie outside of his allotted monthly visit. After thanking Mereoleona and Fuegoleon for the party she takes the orphans home, happy that she raised such excellent students.
| 135 | 135 | "The One Who Has My Heart, My Mind, and Soul"; Transliteration: "Kokoro ni, Kokoro ni, Kokoro ni Kimeta Hito" (Japanese: 心に、心に、心に決めた人) | Directed by : Fumio Maezono; Storyboarded by : Yūsuke Onoda | Mio Inoue | Hirokimi Shiratori | July 21, 2020 | October 11, 2020 |
Finral decides he must get serious about making Finnes Calmreich happy and asks Asta to cure his habitual flirting. Asta takes Finral to a mixer with Rebecca Scarlett and her friends Karen and Eliza and bans Finral from flirting, though Finral panics when his lack of flirting actually attracts Eliza. A nearby Sekke tries to impress women by taking credit for Asta's heroics against the elves, so Noelle punishes him. Secre notices a disguised Langris and Finnes observing Finral trying not to flirt. Captain Charlotte is also attending a mixer organized by her knights to get her and Yami together, but Yami is so dense he doesn’t notice. Charlotte is advised to feed Yami and touch him physically. Asta's mixer improves as Eliza realizes Finral resembles the prince from her favorite novel, and Karen begins to take an interest in Luck. Charlotte accidentally touches Yami’s hand before she is ready and overreacts. Finral instinctively saves her but impresses Finnes when he doesn't flirt with Charlotte and declares he loves someone else. Eliza and Karen lose interest and leave but both mixers decide to have one big mixer together, despite the embarrassment of the ladies and idiocy of the men. Yami hopes everyone trains hard together for the next six months.
| 136 | 136 | "A Black Deep-Sea Story"; Transliteration: "Kuro no Shinkai Monogatari" (Japanese: 黒の深海物語) | Directed by : Tsurumi Mukoyama; Storyboarded by : Tatsuya Yoshihara, Ayataka Tanemura & Yoshihiro Sugai | Mio Inoue | Kyung Hwan Kim, Itsuko Takeda, Hiroshi Numata & Nami Hayashi | July 28, 2020 | October 25, 2020 (Note: Adult Swim preempted Black Clover on the night of October 17–18, 2020) |
The Underwater Temple is attacked. The Black Bulls visit the beach to begin serious training. Noelle begins having memory flashes of her mother. Kahono and Kiato take the Bulls to the Temple. Gifso explains they were attacked by a Sea Guardian who has become violently angry and the only ones who can soothe it are Kahono and Kiato. To test herself Noelle offers to use Sea Dragon’s Cradle to enter the Void. Yami sends Finral with them but forbids anyone else from helping. In the Void they are attacked by mutated fish monsters. Noelle manages to tap into the Natural Mana of the ocean and defeats them. Travelling deeper they find a Kraken which Noelle defeats with her Valkyrie Armor. Finally locating the whale-like Guardian Kahono and Kiato soothe it, revealing the Guardian has recently given birth and her protective instincts caused all nearby sea creatures to protect the baby and causing the Kraken to attack their Temple. Now soothed, the Guardian gives Noelle a memory of her mother, making Noelle realize Acier must once have visited the Guardian as well. Noelle and the others return to the surface to celebrate. Yami privately praises Finral for growing from the useless good-for-nothing he used to be, then punishes him for accidentally teleporting a Kraken tentacle to the Black Bulls during Noelle's fight.
| 137 | 137 | "Charmy's Century of Hunger, Gordon's Millennium of Loneliness"; Transliteration: "Chāmī Hyaku-nen no Shokuyoku to Gōdon Sen'nen no Kodoku" (Japanese: チャーミー百年の食欲とゴードン千年の孤独) | Directed by : Naoki Horiuchi; Storyboarded by : Shigehisa Iida | Masanao Akahoshi & Kunihiko Okada | Hiroshi Numata | August 4, 2020 | February 14, 2021 (Note: Adult Swim placed Black Clover on hiatus after the night of October 24–25, 2020, due to production delays for the English dub caused by the COVID-19 pandemic. The anime resumed its broadcast on the night of February 13–14, 2021.) |
Charmy tries to create food that can enhance mana and asks Jamo, head chef of magic knight headquarters, to be his student. Charmy undergoes a quest to find rare ingredients, a Mentanpin Mandoradora, a Noonesheardofthis Coelacanth and hair from the buttocks of a Surprisesquatch. Charmy cooks the ingredients but the meal mutates into a beast born from Charmy's drive to create mana enhancing meals. The beast begins stealing everyone’s mana so Asta decides to eat the beast alongside the Black Bulls who devour the beast to get their mana back. Asta correctly guesses Charmy was too focused on mana enhancement but forgot to create food that is delicious. Gordon tries to train with Asta, but his Poison Magic is unsuitable for a direct fight. Gordon quits the Black Bulls to rediscover the power of having no friends. He travels to the forest to battle wild animals, only to lose his food to monkeys. After several days of isolation he picks a fight with giant wolves immune to poison, causing him to realize friends make him stronger than loneliness. After apologizing to the wolf mother for bothering her she leads him back home. Gordon finds the base empty and rushes to find his friends, thinking they must have gotten lost searching for him, when in reality the Black Bulls hadn’t even noticed he was missing and went out for a meal.
| 138 | 138 | "In Zara's Footsteps"; Transliteration: "Zara o Tsugu Mono" (Japanese: ザラを継ぐ者) | Directed by : Toshiaki Kanbara; Storyboarded by : Takashi Iida | Masanao Akahoshi | Hirokimi Shiratori | August 11, 2020 | February 21, 2021 |
While visiting his father's grave Zora sees a young man, Ina, being bullied by a noble boy, Kaito. Ina swears to prove peasants are equal to nobles, like his hero Zara. Kaito attacks Ina with Fire Magic so Zora scares him away. Ina's father arrives and Zora recognizes him as a flower seller from his village who also admired Zara. Ina becomes angry at his father for them being peasants. Angered at his attitude Zora reminds him Zara was a peasant but always believed he could become a magic knight because he could do something nobles couldn't. Zora advises Ina to figure out what that was. Kaito returns to get revenge on Ina with a magic bracelet, but he loses control of the bracelet and Zora saves Ina while Kaito flees. Later, Kaito's father accuses Ina of stealing the bracelet and plans to have him arrested but is surprised Ina's father possesses Water Magic equal to his Fire Magic. Zora intervenes, exposes Kaito as a liar and the terrified noble flees. Ina’s father reveals he also has hopes of becoming a magic knight and still trains every day, despite his crippled leg. Ina realizes, unlike most nobles, peasants are capable of achieving through sheer hard work. He apologises to his father and promises they will both be magic knights. Zora returns to the Black Bulls, deciding to get serious about becoming as strong as Asta.
| 139 | 139 | "A Witch's Homecoming"; Transliteration: "Majo no Kikyō" (Japanese: 魔女の帰郷) | Directed by : Yasumi Mikamoto; Storyboarded by : Yukihiro Matsushita | Kunihiko Okada | Hiroshi Numata | August 18, 2020 | February 28, 2021 |
Vanessa returns to the Witches Forest to ask the Queen of Witches for help in the coming battle, admitting Rouge can be defeated if Vanessa runs out of magic. The Queen refuses, but does promise a way to increase her power, on condition Vanessa helps the security golems guard the forest against dangerous magical beasts. She sends two novice witches to help, Samantha Kravitz and Elvira Aguirre whose Sound and Illusion Magic are ill-suited to battle. Samantha is prone to panicking like Grey while Elvira is too proud to admit her weaknesses like Noelle and Vanessa realizes her mother gave her an impossible task to make her quit. Vanessa finds Dominante Code trading magic tools to the witches to support Fanzell, who cannot get a job due to being a wanted criminal. Vanessa is inspired and decides to show Samantha and Elvira how their magic can be useful too depending on how they use it. Together they create prey illusions to lure the beasts away then a giant monster illusion to scare them back to their own territory. The rest of the Witches congratulate Vanessa, the Queen having broadcast their fight to the whole forest. Vanessa decides she doesn't need the Queen's help and returns home to inform Yami she is quitting drinking to focus on serious training.
| 140 | 140 | "A Favor for Julius"; Transliteration: "Yuriusu no Tanomi Koto" (Japanese: ユリウスの頼み事) | Ayataka Tanemura | Kanichi Katō | Kosei Takahashi & Hiroshi Numata | August 25, 2020 | March 7, 2021 |
The Wizard King has Sally temporarily released from prison to help Magic Item Researcher Makusa North create a new magic item for the Black Bulls. Asta volunteers as her test subject but Sally insists she needs subjects with magic so she starts chasing the other Black Bulls. After a series of bizarre, explosive experiments, Sally takes their data and a sample of Asta's hair, deciding that making tools to help people might actually be fun. The Wizard King, worried about Arandom Village in the Forsaken Lands, sends Fuegoleon, Nozel and Marx to investigate reports of bandits. They find the villagers wary of them. Fuegoleon claims to be friends with Chronovala, the old woman disguise the Wizard King uses, and the villagers immediately invite them to stay the night. That night the bandits try to rob them, and when Fuegoleon and Nozel defend themselves the bandits are revealed to be the villagers. Mayer, their leader, admits that since the Midnight Sun destroyed their village they had to become bandits to avoid complete poverty. Realizing the Kingdom had failed to support such remote villages after the elves invasion; Nozel and Fuegoleon punish the villagers by ordering them to help rebuild other villages while themselves providing the funds and other magic knights to help them. The Wizard King congratulates Nozel and Fuegoleon for making the right decision and also for learning a valuable lesson about the kingdom’s citizens.
| 141 | 141 | "The Golden Family"; Transliteration: "Konjiki no Kazoku" (Japanese: 金色の家族) | Directed by : Akira Shimizu; Storyboarded by : Takashi Iida | Mio Inoue | Keizō Shimizu | September 1, 2020 | March 14, 2021 |
Klaus and Mimosa worry Yuno's personality unintentionally prevents him making friends. Vangeance sends a team to Saussy to deal with wild magical boars. Alecdora Sandler, jealous of Yuno's fame and abilities, decides to outdo Yuno by any means necessary. Yuno learns Asta is famous in Saussy for defeating the previous boar attack and stopping Heath Grice. Alecdora orders the boars be killed but Yuno insists on discovering why the boars are abnormally violent and finds them eating fruit infected with dark mana. With the trees removed the boars return to normal, infuriating Alecdora. Next, Vangeance sends them to a new dungeon. Langris privately suggests Yuno might make a better team leader than Alecdora and while Vangeance is pleased Langris' attitude has changed, he insists Alecdora also has lessons to learn. The team invades the dungeon, defeating bandits and confronting their leader, a former magic knight using a magic vase that can absorb any spell regardless of its power. He overwhelms Alecdora and defeats him while using the vase to absorb everyone else's spells. Working together the team strip him of his magic items, allowing Yuno to defeat him. While reporting to Vangeance Alecdora admits the mission would have failed without Yuno and apologises for his jealous, judgmental attitude. As the team go for a meal together Yuno realizes he has begun to make friends.
| 142 | 142 | "Those Remaining"; Transliteration: "Nokosareta Hitobito" (Japanese: 残された人々) | Directed by : Rokō Ogiwara; Storyboarded by : Shigehisa Iida | Kazuyuki Fudeyasu | Hiroshi Numata | September 8, 2020 | March 21, 2021 |
Before the Midnight Sun attacked the capital, a young woman named Dazu Tayaku lived with her husband and mother-in-law. Dazu is a user of Catalyst Magic, meaning she can only borrow magic from others but has no magic of her own. During the elves invasion her husband and mother-in-law were both killed. Dazu later heard the false rumour of Asta being a devil's servant and causing the invasion. At the same time one of Damnatio's subordinates, Kabwe Karyon, is furious Damnatio gave Asta and Secre six months to prove their innocence instead of executing them instantly. Dazu, and her friend, Bou Nokude, approach Kabwe about joining the Devil Banishers, their vigilante group dedicated to revenge against the devil's servants, meaning Asta, Secre and anyone formerly possessed by an elf soul. First, they kidnap Gauche's sister Marie from the church, injuring Neige when he tries to stop them. Next, they attack the Black Bulls' hideout, knocking Asta and Secre unconscious with gas, but when Noelle arrives the Devil Banishers only manage to escape with Secre,but not before she frees Asta from the tracking spell bracelet placed on him by Nozel and takes it herself. Noelle tends to Asta while Gauche goes to visit Marie and is furious when he learns she is missing.
| 143 | 143 | "The Tilted Scale"; Transliteration: "Katamuita Tenbin" (Japanese: 傾いた天秤) | Directed by : Fumio Maezono; Storyboarded by : Yukihiro Matsushita | Masanao Akahoshi | Hirokimi Shiratori | September 15, 2020 | March 28, 2021 |
The Devil Banishers take Secre to their hideout in Dazu's destroyed village. Once Yami is reassured Asta will eventually wake up on his own he has Marx examine Asta's memories. Meanwhile Gauche interrogates Neige about Marie's kidnap and deduces the kidnappers are linked to Damnatio and forces his way into his office. Damnatio denies all knowledge of Marie's kidnapping and tries to pass judgement on them for destroying his office. Yami, having sensed the commotion, arrives to save them and learns about Marie being kidnapped as well as Secre. Damnatio willingly lets Marx examine his memories to prove his innocence. The Wizard King sends Nozel who reveals the bracelet he placed on Asta is still working, meaning when Secre removed it from Asta she must have put it on herself. The Black Bulls decide to travel to the location with Gauche only being allowed to go when the Wizard King insists Damnatio let him. Nozel also decides to go, almost getting in a fight when Yami teases him about being worried about Noelle’s safety. Arriving at the village Noelle is surprised the village is still in ruins so long after the invasion and Nozel regrets there are only so many magic knights to help and many such villages are still suffering. Yami and Finral come across Dazu at her husband and mother-in-law's graves.
| 144 | 144 | "Those Who Wish for the Devil's Demise"; Transliteration: "Akuma no Horobi o Negau Mono" (Japanese: 悪魔の滅びを願う者) | Directed by : Shigeru Fukase; Storyboarded by : Takashi Iida | Kunihiko Okada | Keizō Shimizu | September 22, 2020 | April 4, 2021 |
Dazu angrily blames the Magic Knights for not protecting her village before storming off to the Devil Banishers headquarters, the basement of Bou's medical clinic, with news the Bulls have arrived, causing Secre's tracking bracelet to be discovered and disposed of. The Devil Banishers decide to kill Marie and Secre as a political message to the corrupt Magic Knights, but Dazu wants to capture Asta first, since his execution will gain more public attention. Unable to question the hostile villagers the Black Bulls reluctantly return to the city where Asta has just awoken. Yami attends a Captains meeting with the Wizard King. Damnatio, having realised several of his subordinates are Devil Banishers who aided in the kidnapping, offers information about Kabwe and his two accomplices, Onoby Sinho, who weilds volatile Barrier Magic, and Siona Caverly, who uses Paper Magic. This information leads the Captains to assume he will execute Secre and Marie as publicly as possible to gain the approval of the common people, possibly leading to revolution against the government, nobles and the Magic Knights, which must be avoided at all costs if they are to stand a chance against Megicula and the Spade Kingdom. In the nearby city of Lehart a message appears announcing the imminent public execution of two devil's servants.
| 145 | 145 | "Rescue"; Transliteration: "Dakkan" (Japanese: 奪還) | Naoki Matsuura | Kanichi Katō | Hiroshi Numata, Nami Hayashi & Kyung Hwan Kim | September 29, 2020 | April 11, 2021 |
The Black Bulls infiltrate Lehart alongside the other Magic Knights and find a large crowd of angry commoners gathered. Vanessa is approached by two Devil Banishers who demand she leaves with them quietly or Secre and Marie will be killed instantly. The Devil Banishers arrive and Kabwe announces he is willing to spare Secre and Marie if Asta surrenders himself. Asta reveals himself but then reveals he is Grey in disguise while the real Asta attacks from above. As the battle rages several Devil Banishers turn invisible and escape with Secre and Marie while Asta follows their ki. Sensing the battle Vanessa decides to escape, only for the two Devil Banishers to reveal their job was to remove her fate altering magic from the battle. The two then commit suicide in front of a shocked Vanessa. Asta catches the Devil Banishers but is forced to surrender his Grimoire. Asta instead surprises them by saving Marie using only physical strength. Yuno arrives with Mimosa and Klaus, forcing the outnumbered Devil Banishers to flee with Secre and Asta’s Grimoire. Yuno reminds a devastated Asta he still possesses his original power, never giving up. Julius worries Asta’s Grimoire was the real target all along, and this is confirmed when an injured Kabwe contacts him and the Captains with the message his Devil Banishers are all dead and Asta’s Grimoire stolen by the Devil Believers, a devil worshipping group aiming to steal the devil’s power from the Grimoire.
| 146 | 146 | "Those Who Worship the Devil"; Transliteration: "Akuma o Agameru Monotachi" (Japanese: 悪魔をあがめる者たち) | Directed by : Matsuo Asami; Storyboarded by : Shigehisa Iida | Masanao Akahoshi | Hiroshi Numata | October 6, 2020 | April 18, 2021 |
Shortly before Kabwe contacted Julius, it is shown he, Onoby, and Siona were poisoned and betrayed by Dazu and the Devil Believers who were using the three gain information from the Magic Paralment in order to take control of Asta's five-leaf Grimoire. They believe that if they gain Devil powers they can become like Asta who became a Magic Knight despite possessing no magic. With Kabwe and the Devil Banishers dead and the Devil Believers exposed the Wizard King orders Yami to destroy them and retrieve Secre and the Grimoire. Following Kabwe's signal they find the Devil Banishers hideout and learn from a villager it was the home of Bow, an apothecary with weak magic. Following her directions the Black Bulls find Dazu's home where her husband and mother-in-law died, where they suspect Dazu's marriage wasn't as happy as they were told. Julius deduces the Devil Believers want to get to the Spade Kingdom to offer Secre and the Grimoire as gifts to Megicula in exchange for his power. During several days of pursuit Yami notices wherever the Devil Believers go people disappear from villages, people with weak magic tempted into joining the Devil Believers to gain Devil powers. Following them over the border into the Spade Kingdom, Asta, Noelle and Magna finally catch up to the Devil Believers who have managed to recruit hundreds of members.
| 147 | 147 | "Prepared to Die"; Transliteration: "Kesshi" (Japanese: 決死) | Directed by : Fumio Maezono; Storyboarded by : Takashi Iida | Kazuyuki Fudeyasu | Hirokimi Shiratori | October 13, 2020 | April 25, 2021 |
The Devil Believers plan to cross the Clover Kingdom's border, outside the Magic Knight's jurisdiction, even though Secre warns them an area of strong natural magic stands between them and the Spade Kingdom but the Devil Believers decide to continue. Magna leaves to try and contact Yami. Asta lands in front of the Devil Believers and is shocked when they begin worshipping him. Asta demands the return of Secre and his Grimoire but Dazu and Bow are determined to go as the risk of death is preferable to returning to their previous lives at the bottom of society, with Dazu expressing her disbain towards her husband annd mother-in-law who mocked her constantly behind closed doors. They also reveal that once Megicula gives them devil powers they plan to return to the Clover Kingdom and destroy it as revenge. Asta furiously criticizes them, despite having suffered like the Devil Believers he only ever wanted to help others. Unable to reason with them Asta offers himself as a replacement for Secre, only for the Devil Believers to restrain himself and Noelle as well as Secre. Bow explains that with Dazu's Catalyst Magic they plan to combine all the Devil Believers weak magic into one spell strong enough to protect them from the natural magic, reasoning that even if only one Devil Believer survives and gains devil powers, the deaths of everyone else will be worth it. Magna finally arrives with Yami.
| 148 | 148 | "Becoming the Light That Shines Through the Darkness"; Transliteration: "Yami o Terasu Hikari ni Naru" (Japanese: 闇を照らす光になる) | Naoki Kotani | Kazuyuki Fudeyasu | Hiroshi Numata & Kyung Hwan Kim | October 20, 2020 | May 2, 2021 |
Asta manages to escape with Noelle and Secre. Nozel and Fuegoleon arrive, causing the Devil Believers to try attacking them by giving all of their magic to Dazu; unfortunately this summons a dragon from the strong magic region. Dazu and Bow are shocked when the Black Bulls save them as Yami, Nozel and Fuegoleon defeat the dragon. Vangeance arrives with Damnatio. The Devil Believers fear Vangeance means to execute them, until Vangeance points out most of them have committed no crimes. The Devil Believers struggle to believe royal captains would bother to negotiate with commoners until Yami points out he became a Captain despite being a commoner and a foreigner. Nozel and Fuegoleon apologize for the discrimination the Devil Believers have faced and swear to improve Clover society. Vangeance even reveals his scarred face to show how committed he is. Convinced, most of the Devil Believers return home. For their crimes Damnatio exiles Dazu, Bow and three other Devil Believers who aided them. He offers them a portal to a safe destination outside the kingdom but they instead opt to enter the magic region on foot to reach the Spade Kingdom, still hoping to gain devil powers. Dazu returns Asta's Grimoire so Asta swears to make the Clover Kingdom a better place, even if the Devil Believers are too far away to see it. As they leave, the Devil Believers warn Asta unless society changes, someone else will finish what they started. With his Grimoire returned, Asta heads home. As the Devil Believers head into the Strong Magic Region, Dazu thinks back to the night her husband and mother-in-law died and it's revealed after her husband called her useless, Dazu snapped and killed both of them, which she has no regrets doing.
| 149 | 149 | "Two Things We Need to Find"; Transliteration: "Futatsu no Sagashi Mono" (Japanese: ふたつのさがしもの) | Directed by : Akira Shimizu; Storyboarded by : Yukihiro Matsushita | Masanao Akahoshi | Keizō Shimizu | October 27, 2020 | May 9, 2021 |
Secre recalls that Lumiere designed a magic tool that could increase magic specifically to help those born with low magic, intending to end the discrimination that created the Devil Believers. Queen Loropechika contacts the Wizard King to discuss the Arcane Magic training, only to suddenly collapse. Finral teleports himself, Yami, Asta and Noelle to her palace, but at Julius's request, Secre stays behind. The Black Bulls discover Loropechika is safe, having collapsed from indigestion, so Yami returns home. Loropechika reveals she is ready to begin their training, but Mugi, one of her pet beavers, has stolen her glasses. After Finral and Noelle both fail to catch Mugi, Asta catches him with his ki detection, impressing Loropechika. Asta returns her glasses, but Loropechika is so clumsy she immediately breaks them. Gaja arrives with multiple spare glasses so Noelle punishes Asta for having wasted their time volunteering to catch Mugi. Loropechika apologizes the preparations took so long but the Spirit Guardians needed to prepare as much as possible to train Asta and Secre together. Julius reveals to Secre he possesses Lumiere's designs for the magic tool and has taken steps to begin building it in order to end magical discrimination. Secre is happy Lumiere's dreams have managed to survive through Julius.
| 150 | 150 | "The Maidens' Challenge"; Transliteration: "Otometachi no Chōsen" (Japanese: 乙女たちの挑戦) | Tsurumi Mukoyama | Kunihiko Okada | Kosei Takahashi & Hiroshi Numata | November 3, 2020 | May 16, 2021 |
Grey decides to overcome her chronic shyness and asks Noelle for help. As Grey is not shy when she transforms into other people Noelle suggests she transform her state of mind instead. Grey approaches Gauche who summons mirrors forcing her to see herself from multiple directions, but she becomes so nervous she can't transform her mind. A butterfly passes by and somehow hypnotizes her, allowing Gauche to order her to not be shy. Grey becomes more confident but returns to her old self when Gauche asks her to turn into Marie and tries to hug her. Gauche points out it doesn't matter who she transforms into, she'll always be Grey, making her feel better. Elsewhere Captain Charlotte realizes most of the Blue Roses have boyfriends, yet she hasn't spoken to Yami in weeks. The Blue Roses advise that since they might die fighting the Spade Kingdom she should confess to Yami soon. When Charlotte instead focuses on training the Blue Roses suggest a joint training session with the Black Bulls might be beneficial. Charlotte tries to ask Yami about the training but becomes embarrassed again and flees. Julius seizes upon the idea of joint training and, to raise the morale of the citizens, decides to hold public training sessions where the Captains duel each other.
| 151 | 151 | "Clash! The Battle of the Magic Knights Squad Captains"; Transliteration: "Gekitotsu! Mahō Kishidan Danchōsen!" (Japanese: 激突!魔法騎士団団長戦!) | Isuta | Mio Inoue | Nami Hayashi & Hiroshi Numata | November 10, 2020 | May 23, 2021 |
The Captains are split into two teams; Yami, Jack, Nozel and Kaiser against Charlotte, Fuegoleon, Dorothy and Vangeance, aiming to destroy the other teams crystals, though Rill is absent for personal reasons. Jack and Yami chase after Charlotte, Vangeance and their crystal while Nozel and Kaiser defend their crystal against Fuegoleon. Nozel captures Fuegoleon inside a mercury cage while Vangeance summons a tree larger than the forest, allowing Dorothy to trap Yami inside her dream dimension, where she forces him to fight a clone of himself. Fuegoleon escapes the cage, damages the crystal, and renders Kaiser unconscious. Jack is trapped inside Vangeance's tree, leaving Nozel alone against Charlotte, Vangeance and Fuegoleon. Dorothy creates a dozen more clones just as Yami starts succumbing to the urge to fall asleep. Kaiser awakens in time to save Nozel, who in turn helps Jack escape the tree. Both teams combine their magic for two overpowered attacks, destroying the entire forest. Yami uses his new Equinox attack and splits the dream world in half to escape. Unfortunately, the attack also splits both crystals, so Julius declares it a draw, to the Captains disappointment. Jack and Yami get in another fight blaming each other for not winning while Charlotte becomes jealous over Dorothy being alone with Yami. With the citizens reassured of the Captains power, the Wizard King declares the match a success.
| 152 | 152 | "To Tomorrow!"; Transliteration: "Ashita e!" (Japanese: 明日へ!) | Directed by : Fumio Maezono; Storyboarded by : Yukihiro Matsushita | Kazuyuki Fudeyasu | Hirokimi Shiratori & Itsuko Takeda | November 17, 2020 | May 30, 2021 |
The Magic Knight Entrance Exam comes again, marking one year since Asta and Noelle joined the Black Bulls. Asta is once again swarmed by the Anti-birds for having zero magic. Noelle meets Nozel who is proud she has improved so much, just like their mother. She thanks him for placing her with the Black Bulls where she made so many friends. Noelle and Asta reminisce about Asta managing to join the Black Bulls despite his terrible exam performance. Yuno watches the exam with Sylph and briefly talks to Asta, reminding each other they both aim to become Wizard King. Yami is intrigued by only one examinee but loses them to another squad, so instead gleefully informs Asta and Noelle they will remain the Black Bulls' most junior members for another year. Julius, watching the exam in disguise, is relieved so many people still want to become Magic Knights despite knowing they would have to join the war against the Spade Kingdom. Vangeance returns Yuno's magic stone necklace, informing him Revchi had found it among the other treasure he took from the elves Shadow Palace. Yami announces a party to celebrate Asta and Noelle's membership anniversary, while Asta and Yuno both decide to grow even stronger.
| 153 | 153 | "The Chosen Ones"; Transliteration: "Erabareshi Monotachi" (Japanese: 選ばれし者たち) | Shigehisa Iida | Momoko Murakami | Hiroshi Numata & Kyung Hwan Kim | November 24, 2020 | June 6, 2021 |
The Captains decide to send Asta, Nero, Noelle, Finral, Luck, Mimosa and Leopold for Heart Kingdom training. Vangeance reveals Yuno declined the training while Charlotte decides to go herself. Rill also decides to go, being still in love with Charmy's mature form and determined to become a man worthy of her. Afterwards they attend a special award ceremony to honor knights who performed great deeds against the elves. For protecting the Wizard King after his defeat by Patry, Sol is promoted to 5th Class Senior Magic Knight. Mimosa is promoted to 2nd Class Intermediate for all the lives she saved at the Shadow Palace. Leopold is promoted to 4th Class Senior for rallying the Crimson Lions to defeat their elf possessed vice-captain. Yuno is promoted to 1st Class Senior for his hand in defeating the devil behind the elves invasion, though the Clover King is visibly outraged at Yuno’s promotion, and promotes Sekke to the same rank as Yuno for saving him from assassination by the elves, despite it being a complete accident. After the King leaves Julius secretly honours Yami as a sign of support for the Black Bulls who can't be promoted due to the Parliamentary Trial. At the Black Bulls' base when Magna learns Luck will receive the training he manages to convince Yami to send him as well. Elsewhere, Langris watches Yuno, aware they are now the same rank.
| 154 | 154 | "Vice Captain Langris Vaude"; Transliteration: "Fuku-danchō Rangirusu Vōdo" (Japanese: 副団長ランギルス・ヴォード) | Directed by : Rokō Ogiwara; Storyboarded by : Naoki Kotani & Ayataka Tanemura | Masanao Akahoshi | Hiroshi Numata & Nami Hayashi | December 1, 2020 | June 13, 2021 |
Rumors spread that Yuno will soon replace Langris as Vice-Captain of the Golden Dawn. Langris speaks with Finnes and learns Finral is still training to make her happy. Langris requests a duel with Yuno, now they are of equal rank, and wagers the loser must quit the Golden Dawn. During the duel Yuno senses that Langris is holding back and deliberately provokes him into using lethal spells, but in the end Yuno outmaneuvers him and Langris admits defeat. Yuno accuses Langris of losing on purpose, which Langris admits was his original plan, but also admits he did try to win after Yuno provoked him but lost anyway. Langris quits the Golden Dawn but not before Yuno demands they duel one day without holding back. Vangeance allows Langris to quit, knowing he has much to learn elsewhere, but reminds him he can always return. Finral, who happened to be visiting Finnes, is warned by Langris he considers him a rival for Finnes love and he won't let him win easily. Yami gets permission from the Wizard King to let Magna undergo Heart Kingdom training. Gordon leaves to begin training his Poison Magic with his father, but no one notices him leave as they are preparing to travel to the Heart Kingdom in the morning.
| 155 | 155 | "The 5 Spirit Guardians"; Transliteration: "Go-nin no Seirei no Kami" (Japanese: 5人の精霊守) | Directed by : Fumio Maezono; Storyboarded by : Takashi Iida | Kunihiko Okada | Hirokimi Shiratori | December 8, 2020 | June 20, 2021 |
The Black Bulls travel to the Heart Kingdom with the other squad members (Leopold, Mimosa, Charlotte, and Rill), including an uninvited Charmy who insists on sampling Heart Kingdom cuisine. Gaja, who will train Luck, introduces the Spirit Guardians, Sarado of Earth who will train Mimosa and Charlotte, Potrof of Plants who will train Rill, Floga of Fire who will train Leopold, and Smurik of Wind who will train Finral. Queen Loropechika announces she will be training Secre while Undine trains Noelle. The Guardians reveal their technique, Mana Words, that enables them to imbue spells with complicated instructions, making them more intricate, accurate, and powerful. Unable to pass Gaja’s first test Magna is deemed not ready and leaves. Rill quickly takes to Mana Words by painting them. Charmy also proves adept at Mana Words but only uses them to find more food. Loropechika reveals to Noelle and Secre the others are being trained to stop the Spade army, but only Loropechika, Undine, Noelle, and Secre together will be capable of stopping Megicula and her human vessel, Vanica. Finral struggles in using his magic for attacks, more used to supporting his teammates. Asta also struggles as his straightforward methods are too limited for Gaja’s more strategic methods and he loses every training match. Finral passes on their progress to Yami who is shown undergoing his own training on Yultim Volcano Trail.
| 156 | 156 | "Awakening Powers"; Transliteration: "Mezame Yuku Chikara" (Japanese: 目覚めゆく力) | Directed by : Chihiro Kumano; Storyboarded by : Yukihiro Matsushita | Mio Inoue | Keizō Shimizu | December 15, 2020 | June 27, 2021 |
Leopold admits to Floga he feels inferior to Mereoleona and Fuegoleon. Yami meets Mereoleona and admits that while he was able to instinctively use Mana Zone against the Word Soul Devil he wants Mereoleona's help using it to its full potential. Yami finds he cannot match the speed of Mereoleona even using ki detection. Asta faces a similar problem with Gaja's Mana Method, a Heart Kingdom technique which uses Mana Words to empower spells with mana from the surrounding environment without depleting the user's own mana. Asta remembers that his Demon-Dweller Sword possesses the ability to borrow magic from others while Yami suddenly develops the ability to maneuver in mid-air using Mana Zone like Mereoleona. Surpassing their limits Asta uses a ranged Anti-Magic attack and land his first blow on Gaja while Yami unlocks a new spell, Mana Zone's Black Hole, which swallows Mereoleona's magic leaving him unharmed. The Guardians report their progress to Loropechika. Rill and Charmy are naturals at Mana Words but Noelle and Secre have made the most progress while Leopold and Finral have self-doubt which holds them back. A group of rebel Spade Kingdom mages attempt to escape into the Clover Kingdom through the strong mana region with important information about the Spade army. They are attacked by Spade soldiers so they transfer their remaining magic to their leader, Ralph, so he can escape. As Ralph is the son of a deceased Spade commander the incident is reported to the Spade King, whose monstrous shadow reveals he is the vessel for a devil.
| 157 | 157 | "Five-Leaf Clover"; Transliteration: "Itsutsuba no Kurōbā" (Japanese: 五つ葉のクローバー) | Takahiro Enokida | Kanichi Katō | Kyung Hwan Kim | December 22, 2020 | July 4, 2021 |
Gaja asks Asta about his early life and the Devil in his Grimoire so Asta explains about being found by Father Orsi, his childhood with Yuno at Hage and his initial failure to receive a Grimoire. After Yuno was attacked by Revchi, Asta was granted the five-leaf clover Grimoire and was accepted into the Black Bulls while Yuno was accepted by the Golden Dawn, later finding the Demon-Dweller Sword that allowed him to borrow the magic of others and his first contact with the elves, when Patry was still masquerading as Licht. He also explains how Yami taught him Ki detection. Gaja asks how Asta activates his Black form so Asta explains about his visit to the Witches Forest and his fight against Ladros when he activated his Black form by accident, then his training at Yultim volcano where he activated it intentionally. Asta explains how he received the Demon-Destroyer Sword during the Elves invasion that helped in his defeat of the Word Soul Devil. All that remained was his trial by Parliament and attempting to prove his innocence. Satisfied with the tale Gaja resumes dueling with Asta. Meanwhile, Loropechika explains to Noelle how everyone is improving and Noelle is hopeful she can get revenge for her mother. Gaja disarms Asta and momentarily sees the Anti-Magic Devil manifesting himself to protect Asta from harm and decides he must push Asta to his limit to grow his powers even further. Within Asta, Anti-Magic Devil declares events are getting a lot more interesting.
Heart Kingdom Joint Struggle Arc
| 158 | 158 | "The Beginning of Hope and Despair"; Transliteration: "Kibō to Zetsubō no Makuake" (Japanese: 希望と絶望の幕開け) | Naoki Matsuura | Kunihiko Okada | Shunji Akasaka & Kyung Hwan Kim | January 5, 2021 | July 11, 2021 |
Ralph continues trying to cross the border. Six months since the start of the Clover mages training in the Heart Kingdom the Spade army has essentially conquered the Diamond Kingdom and has begun crossing the border in a mechanized citadel called Candelo powered by siphoning magic from Spade commoners. Asta, who has grown even stronger from the and can now fly astride his Demon-Slayer Sword, flies to Candelo where he is enraged to see Spade Knights siphoning prisoners to death. He defeats the Spade soilders demonstrating the ability to remotely call his Demon Slayer Sword to him and a new flying Anti-Magic slash technique, Demon-Dweller Sword: Black Slash. Asta confronts Candelo's commander who reveals he is also the vessel for a devil's power. He poisons Asta with Poison Magic but Asta easily nullifys the poison into the Demon-Destroyer Sword and furiously cuts the citadel in half, defeating the captain in a single blow. The Black Bulls arrive and Mimosa helps the prisoners recover. Noelle reveals Luck and Leopold were sent to destroy the Spade base near to the prisoner's village. Realizing they get to return home safely the prisoners reveal the Spade Kingdom is ruled by the Dark Triad, each possessed by a powerful devil, and their followers the Dark Disciples who draw demonic power from the Triad. The Triad, siblings Dante, Vanica and Zenon Zogratis, consider the loss of Candelo trivial when they are close to their goal for which they only need capture two Arcane Stage mages. Ralph finally crosses the border and collapses by Hage Church where Sister Lily finds him calling out for "Lord Yuno".
| 159 | 159 | "Quiet Lakes and Forest Shadows"; Transliteration: "Shizuka na Mizuumi to Mori no Kage" (Japanese: 静かな湖と森の影) | Directed by : Fumio Maezono; Storyboarded by : Takashi Iida | Mio Inoue | Hirokimi Shiratori | January 12, 2021 | July 18, 2021 |
Sister Lily helps Ralph recover. Loropechika decides to keep capturing villages from the Spade Kingdom. Charmy has been pillaging the forests fruit and there is almost none left. Loropechika takes the girls to the royal hot spring to bathe where Undine is curious which of the girls is dating Asta. Noelle refuses to admit liking Asta while Mimosa admits she is too afraid to confess. Secre, who spends the most time with Asta, merely admits he has the best head for sitting on. Mimosa asks about Gaja and Loropechika who regretfully insists they are just friends. Asta finds Charmy has eaten so much fruit she has gained weight. He suggests she stop eating so she sets her giant sheep chef on him. Yuno, now Vice-Captain of the Golden Dawn. receives a message from Hage. Potrof teams up with Asta and Rill who manage to defeat Charmy. Rill claims he fights for the woman he loves and shows Asta a portrait of her, which Asta realizes, is Charmy in her adult form, though Rill doubts it is Charmy due to her weight gain. Yuno travels to Hage where Ralph reveals that the Dark Triad stole the Spade Kingdom from the former royal family, House Grinberryall, and Yuno is their missing heir, Prince Yuno of House Grinberryall.
| 160 | 160 | "The Messenger from the Spade Kingdom"; Transliteration: "Supēdo Ōkoku no Shisha" (Japanese: スペード王国の使者) | Tsurumi Mukoyama | Masanao Akahoshi | Kosei Takahashi & Hiroshi Numata | January 19, 2021 | July 25, 2021 |
After getting over his surprise at Yuno being the Prince of the Spade Kingdom, Father Orsi asks about Asta, since he was left on the same night as Yuno, but Ralph has no idea who Asta is. With his Flame Magic Ralph shows Yuno visions of his past. Yuno was born the first son of King Royce and Queen Ciel who gave him his necklace and for a time the Spade Kingdom was peaceful, until the three Zogratis siblings, three of the strongest Spade warriors, gained devil powers and attacked the castle. Yuno was smuggled out of the Spade Kingdom through the strong magic region by Ralph's father. After placing Yuno outside the orphanage he led the Spade soldiers away, killing them and himself by collapsing a cliff. Before Yuno can think how to react to the revelation he receives word Golden Dawn headquarters has been attacked. Zenon Zogratis of the Dark Triad orders his disciples to kill every Golden Dawn member except William Vangeance, the Arcane Stage mage he needs, and savagely attacks the knights who get in his way. Alecdora tries portect William from Zenon but is immediately defeated by Zenon's Bone Magic. Yuno rushes to help his squad, many of whom are injured or already dead.
| 161 | 161 | "Zenon's Power"; Transliteration: "Zenon no Chikara" (Japanese: ゼノンの力) | Directed by : Akira Shimizu; Storyboarded by : Shigehisa Iida | Momoko Murakami | Keizō Shimizu & Hiroshi Numata | January 26, 2021 | August 15, 2021 (Note: Adult Swim preempted Black Clover on the night of July 31–August 1, 2021. The following week on August 7–8, Adult Swim showed a Harley Quinn marathon.) |
Yuno tries to defend his surviving comrades but struggles against Gaderois, a Dark Disciple using devil enhanced Stone Magic. Gaderois brags about the Dark Triad who gave demonic power to murderers like him to make them Zero Stage mages. When he also brags about the Dark Triad killing the Spade King, Yuno summons his Spirit of Zephyr wind sword and destroys Gaderois stone armor, cutting him down. Klaus faces a disciple named Foyal using enhanced Mist Magic and he is unable to fight back as Foyal can turn his body intangible. Yuno blows away the mist while Letoile uses her Compass Magic to expose Foyal's real body. Klaus impales Foyal with his iron spear, defeating him. Zenon suddenly appears, having defeated and captured Vangeance. Zenon uses his Bone Magic to summon spears made of his own bones and impales Klaus and Letoile. Impressed by Yuno's power Zenon decides to show Yuno fifty-five of his devil power, gaining devil-like features and completely overwhelms him. Ralph arrives at the Golden Dawn and finds an impaled Yuno dying. Vangeance's World Tree suddenly sprouts from the rubble and begins healing everyone since, even defeated, Vangeance used the last of his magic to help heal his knights, though fully half of the Golden Dawn (including Siren and Hamon) is dead and Vangeance was taken by Zenon, as Yuno screams in anguish for not being strong enough to defend his comrades of defeat Zenon.
| 162 | 162 | "The Great War Breaks Out"; Transliteration: "Taisen Boppatsu" (Japanese: 大戦勃発) | Naoki Kotani | Kunihiko Okada | Shunji Akasaka, Nami Hayashi & Kyung Hwan Kim | February 2, 2021 | August 22, 2021 |
Rill and Charlotte depart to meet the other captains so Asta and Finral return to their base. Loropechika and Undine suddenly sense six enemies inside the kingdom, including Vanica Zogratis and her devil Megicula. Asta reaches Black Bull's base (which has moved to the neutral zone between the Clover and Spade Kingdoms to act as a first line of defense) and Finral teleports to fetch Yami. Gordon continues training in curse magic with his family. Asta learns that after Magna returned from the Heart Kingdom he disappeared with Zora. Henry suddenly warns the Black Bulls the base is being levitated by Dante Zogratis using Gravity Magic. Realizing his target, Yami, is absent, Dante attempts to crush the base, only failing due to Rouge. Seeing Vanessa is both powerful and beautiful Dante decides he wants her as a mistress. Gauche creates multiple Asta clones, hoping Dante cannot dodge them all, but Dante activates his devil form and using fifty percent of his devil's power generates a reality warping gravity field so every attack misses. Seeing that Asta is also devil possessed Dante attempts to reason with him that humans are the evil ones but Asta furiously disagrees. Dante increases his devil power to sixty precent and destroys Rouge before crushing a rock into a sword and stabbing Gauche. Asta has a very brief flashback of a woman calling him her beloved son before unleashing his devil powers, going berserk as his Black form now cover most of his face and sprouting a demonic tail and a second smaller wing. Lucifero, Dante’s devil, doesn't know who Asta's devil is as the only high-ranking devil he's aware of being in the human world is Zagred (the Word Soul Devil), but assures Dante that Asta is likely possessed by a low level devil, so Dante is shocked when Asta manages to predict his movements and slash his face, enraging him.
| 163 | 163 | "Dante vs. the Captain of the Black Bulls"; Transliteration: "Dante Bāsasu Kuro no Bōgyū Danchō" (Japanese: ダンテVS黒の暴牛団長) | Directed by : Rokō Ogiwara; Storyboarded by : Yukihiro Matsushita | Momoko Murakami | Hiroshi Numata | February 9, 2021 | August 29, 2021 |
Dante use Gravity Magic to enchance his punches and overwhelmes Asta with a flurry a blows. Grey recalls how her stepmother doted on her beautiful stepsisters while she was abused. After receiving her Grimoire she made herself beautiful, causing her stepsisters to attack her. She ran away only to be saved from bandits by Gauche who told her to find some resolve. Grey began assuming her giant scary form to survive, joining the Black Bulls to be close to Gauche. Desperate not to let Gauche die, Grey uses her Transformation Magic to turn Gauche's wound into healed flesh. Dante knocks Asta unconscious and decides he wants both Vanessa and Grey as mistresses, but they are saved when Finral arrives with Yami. Yami shows he can use his Black Moon spell to generate gravitational fields and resist Dante's gravity. Dante confirms Yami is the arcane mage he needs to cut through dimensions and reach the underworld. Yami responds by slashing Dante's chest. Meanwhile, the Dark Disciples defeat the Spirit Guardians and begin destroying the Heart Kingdom. Luck challenges the Disciple Svenkin, whose Skin Magic can manipulate his body to make it perfectly resistant to any magic, including Luck's lightning. Disgusted by Svenkin's selfish personality Luck uses a spell he learned from Gaja and turns himself into a spear of naturally generated lightning, which Svenkin cannot defend against, and shoots himself straight through Svenkin's chest, defeating him.
| 164 | 164 | "Battlefield: Heart Kingdom"; Transliteration: "Senjō Hāto Ōkoku" (Japanese: 戦場 ハート王国) | Directed by : Matsuo Asami & Fumio Maezono; Storyboarded by : Takashi Iida | Mio Inoue | Hirokimi Shiratori | February 16, 2021 | September 5, 2021 |
Before regaining consciousness Asta sees within his mindscape the Anti-Magic Devil angerly repeating that he'll "kill them all". Dante, using a completely different kind of magic than Gravity Magic to heal himself, is overjoyed that Yami was able to cut him as he had grown completely bored of the human world and Yami made him enjoy combat again. He explains that the Dark Triad plan to reach the Underworld but require a spell called Tree of Qliphoth, which requires Vangeance's World Tree Magic and Yami’s Dark Magic to allow every devil from the underworld to come to the human world. Dark Disciple Halbet sets the Heart Kingdom's fruit trees on fire, claiming all that is required for health and beauty is basic nutrition, thus eating food for pleasure is ridiculous. Outraged by this, the comically obese Charmy confronts her, but her Cotton Magic has no affect on Halbert's Hair Magic, so Charmy activates her mature form, instantly losing her excess weight and transforming her giant sheep into her gluttonous wolf. Using the Mana Method, Charmy cooks Halbet's magic and it's entirely consumed leaving her defenseless, so Charmy beats her up, ruining her flawless beauty. Dark Disciple Sivoir battles Leopold using his Eyeball Magic to create hundreds of magic eyes to watch the entire battlefield. Leopold is injured by Sivoir's long range attacks who brags about how no one has ever injured hem nor has ever ever felt pain, but soon realizes that Leopold had been enduring the attacks in order to craft a giant array of mana words and summons a giant gout of flames. Not knowing how to handle pain, Sivoir leaves himself venerable and Leopold defeats him, while at the same time Gaja defeats another Dark Disciple. Loropechika's throne room is suddenly invaded by masochistic Dark Disciple Robero, but he's immediately deafeated by Mimosa. Then Dark Triad member Vanica arrives, whom Loropechika recognizes.
| 165 | 165 | "Water Crusade"; Transliteration: "Mizu no Seisen" (Japanese: 水の聖戦) | Directed by : Matsuo Asami; Storyboarded by : Yukihiro Matsushita | Masanao Akahoshi | Hiroshi Numata | February 23, 2021 | September 12, 2021 |
In the Spade Kingdom a spy from the Clover Kingdom is discovered in Dante's office, revealed to be wearing a Black Bull robe under their cape. Vanica, the one who cursed Loropechika, demands Loropechika while Robero is suddenly revived. As Gaja prepares to return to aid Loropechika, the Dark Disciple he defeated, Nail Magic user Hischer Ongg, also revives. Vanica also reveals that she cursed each of the Dark Disciples with immortality, meaning none of the Dark Disciples have actually been defeated. The Dark Disciples all recover from their injuries and continue attacking the kingdom, with Vanica revealing they will only die if they kill her first. Noelle attacks Vanica but she counters with her Blood Magic. Noelle recalls that Loropechika told them that those who are devil-possessed can wield two types of magic, their own and their devil's, with Vanica's being her Blood Magic and Megicula's Curse-Warding Magic. Mimosa keeps Robero and his Tongue Magic at bay while the others duel Vanica, who hints at the impending capture of Vangeance and Yami. Loropechika, who has inherited the knowledge and experiences of all previous Heart Queens in a library in her mind, realizes they are trying to grow the Tree of Qliphoth and destroy the human world. Combining Mana Zone with Mana Words Loropechika succeeds in halving Vanica's magic power while increasing Noelle's, who unveils her Valkyrie Armor's Mermaid Form, but she is still almost overwhelmed when Vanica uses fifty percent of her devil power and slowly increases it. Loropechika, who had previously admitted she felt afraid and thus unfit to be queen, decides not to be afraid and begins her plan to defeat Vanica. By forcing Vanica to draw all the blood from her body using her own Blood Magic, she begins using Megicula's magic instead of her own, increasing her devil power to her maximum of seventy percent. At that moment, Secre appears and seals Megicula's magic in an eternal prison.
| 166 | 166 | "Captain: Yami Sukehiro"; Transliteration: "Danchō Yami Sukehiro" (Japanese: 団長 ヤミ・スケヒロ) | Naoki Matsuura | Kunihiko Okada | Shunji Akasaka, Nami Hayashi & Hiroshi Numata | March 2, 2021 | September 19, 2021 |
Megicula takes over Vanica's body, shatters the eternal prison and captures Secre. Loropechika is overcome with fear when she realizes Megicula has also cursed Undine, and her proximity to Megicula activates her own curse, crippling her with pain. Vanica decides to kill her but Noelle manages to fight back and stab Vanica through the chest. Vanica at first is able to withstand the attack and strike Noelle down but is actually injured from Noelle's attack. Vanica is impressed and asks Noelle's name, Noelle replying she is a Clover royal and a Black Bull. Yami and Dante continue their battle, with Dante unleashes his devil powers at his maximum eighty percent, allowing him to create gravitational singularity strong enough to obliterate mountains and even warp Yami's Dimension Slash. Dante explains if they manage to open the Tree of Qliphoth he will have access to all Lucifero's powers, though he is unsure if the same applies to Asta who uses Anti-Magic. Yami is crushed under a giant boulder but survives and, deciding he must once again surpass his limits, condenses his entire mana zone to just the tip of his sword and creates Death Thrust, which obliterates Dante's entire torso. However Dante's own Body Magic, boosted by Lucifero's power, regenerates him in seconds and transforms himself into a hulking monster, claiming his magic makes him incapable of dying,. Asta struggles to stand, but to his surprise, Yami announces he cannot win without Asta's help, and Asta finds the strength to stand beside Yami and they battle Dante together, as equals.
| 167 | 167 | "Black Oath"; Transliteration: "Kuro no Chikai" (Japanese: 黒の誓い) | Directed by : Naoki Kotani; Storyboarded by : Naoki Kotani & Isuta | Masanao Akahoshi | Hiroshi Numata, Itsuko Takeda & Kyung Hwan Kim | March 9, 2021 | September 26, 2021 |
Vanica decides not to kill Loropechika but to take her to the Spade Kingdom and recalls fighting someone similar to Noelle, and remembers the person to be Acier Silva, Noelle's mother. Using a curse-bomb Vanica kills all of her subordinates and cause explosions all over the Heart Kingdom and tells Noelle to get stronger and she'll be waiting for her in the Spade Kingdom and takes Loropechika with her. Back at the Black Bull's headquarters Asta and Yami fight Dante. Asta decides to awaken his dormant power, in doing so he meets his devil. Asta converses with the devil, who agrees to give him some of his true power in return for a part of his body. With renewed power Asta's right arm turns black with red cracks over it and fights Dante, with Yami supporting him, though the Anti-Magic Devil warns him his body will only hold out for fifty seconds. Asta manages to get close to Dante, but he's disarmed of all his swords. At the very last second before Asta's power runs out, Yami thoses over his katana to him. Infusing it with Anti-Magic, Asta slash Dante nullifying his magic and Lucifero's power, defeating. Grey is overjoyed to see Gauche alive. Before Yami can finish Dante, Zenon arrives with a still unconscious and captured William Vengeance and restrains him while recovering Dante. Zenon also tries to capture Asta but is stopped by Finral and realizes he's still injured from his last fight with Yuno so he decides to retreat. Enraged, Gauche and Henry attack Zenon but their attacks fail to hit him. Asta's devil rejects Asta's plea to trade more power. Vanessa also tries to use Rouge to save Yami but Zenon (who's devil grants him Spatial Magic) sends Rogue back, Zenon escapes taking William and Yami with him leaving the Black Bulls devastated.
| 168 | 168 | "Stirrings of the Strongest"; Transliteration: "Saikyō no Taidō" (Japanese: 最強の胎動) | Directed by : Matsuo Asami; Storyboarded by : Yukihiro Matsushita | Mio Inoue | Hirokimi Shiratori | March 16, 2021 | October 3, 2021 |
Owen examines Gauche and is astounded by his recovery, revealing to Grey her magic might not be Transformation Magic. Asta realises Yami's katana has appeared in his Grimoire. He tries to leave the hospital but is stopped by Nacht, the secret Vice Captain of the Black Bulls and also devil-possessed. Though he admits he despises Yami, he offers to teach Asta how to use his devil's power and introduces him to his devil, Gimodelo. He also reveals he has been a spy in the Spade kingdom for years. Nacht takes Asta to an emergency Captains meeting. The Captains, not recognizing Nacht, try to attack him, Nacht surprises everyone by revealing he has four devils. Jack recognizes Nacht, but Nacht says that that man is gone. Nacht reveals Yami and Vangeance will be sacrificed in a seven day ceremony to open the gates to the seven levels of the underworld. Scattered throughout the gates are ten devils compatible with the Tree of Qliphoth, with the lower the level the storger the deivl from it with the weakest of among them are on par with the Dark Triad, and if the strongest, Lucifero, were to emerge, then the world would end. Nacht then says he has a plan to save Yami and Vangeance. Nacht reveals he's not strong to defeat the Dark Triad but he will train Asta to control his devil and make him stronger and have an elite team made from the captains invade the Spade Kingdom and rescue Yami and William and stop the ritual in 2 days. Nacht also forces Yuno to reveal he is Spade royalty, making some Captains unsure whether he can be trusted, until Yuno gives an impassioned speech about retrieving Vangeance and Bell reveals she's storing all the mana she can so they can defeat Zenon, Nacht also reveals that Vanica might have also attacked the Heart Kingdom. Meanwhile, Noelle awakens to find she's in the presence of Patry, Rhya, Fana and Vetto, former members of the Eye of the Midnight Sun.
| 169 | 169 | "The Devil-Binding Ritual"; Transliteration: "Jūma no Gi" (Japanese: 従魔の儀) | Directed by : Tsurumi Mukoyama; Storyboarded by : Shigehisa Iida | Momoko Murakami | Kosei Takahashi | March 23, 2021 | October 10, 2021 |
Noelle wakes up to see Patry and the former members of The Third Eye. She finds out that Nero, Charmy, Leopold, Mimosa and Luck are also with her. Patry tells Noelle that they are in Elysia, a secluded strong magic region in the Heart Kingdom. They also realize Elysia is the Elves' new village, Tetia revealed to survived the elves's slaughter centuries ago thanks to Nero and that she was pregnant with twins with Elysia's residents descended from Licht's surviving child Patry narrates that the guardian of Elysia, Dryad foretold them to save Noelle and her comrades, and they're the reason why they are in Elysia. Patry also tells them they managed to withstand the explosions and saved the Heart Kingdom, Noelle then pleads the elves to help them become stronger to save Loropechika. The elves to aid them by teaching them Ultimate Magic. Back at the Royal Capital, Julius is informed by Gaja about what happened at the Heart Kingdom. At the Black Bulls headquarters, Vanessa and the others meet Nacht for the first time. He explains why the members are seeing him for the first time is because he hates the Black Bulls, and that he does what he wants as a vice-captain. He then insults them before telling them if they want to save Yami then they must find a way to become stronger in 2 days. Consequently, Nacht using his Shadow Magic, which lets him move himself and anything he touches through shadows, takes Asta to an abandoned house that belonged to a noble family a long ago with Nacht initiates the Devil-Binding ritual to summon the Anti-Magic Devil (with Asta's right arm appearing on him), instructing Asta to defeat the devil in battle. But Asta instead thanks the devil for helping him in past events. The devil then takes the Demon-Slayer Sword from Asta's grimoire telekinetically attacks Asta with it. Despite Asta saying he sense no killing intent, Nacht says that he has to fight or the devil will take over Asta's body, saying devils have no principles. The Anti-Magic devil agrees saying all devils are nothing but scum, but Asta still refuse to fight and says that he's not bad despite being a devil. Hearing this causes the devil to remembers a woman from his past who resembles Asta.
| 170 | 170 | "The Faraway Future"; Transliteration: "Haruka Mirai" (Japanese: ハルカミライ) | Directed by : Rokō Ogiwara, Ayataka Tanemura & Takahiro Enokida; Storyboarded by : Ayataka Tanemura | Kanichi Katō | Itsuko Takeda & Kosei Takahashi | March 30, 2021 | October 10, 2021 |
The Anti-Magic devil narrates the rules of power in the underworld, where the devils' only amusement was tormenting those weaker then them, was that he was the most tormented because he had no magic. He talks about how he was able to pass through the gates of the underworld, into the human world as he had no magic. Despite having no ill intent towards humans they still hunted him for being a devil. He is rescued by a woman named Lichita, whose magic allow her store things with no mana into other objects. Lichita explains her condition that causes her drain mana and lifeforce from all near her, forcing her to live alone, yet for some reason the devil was immune to it. Seeing it at fate as she previously found Licht's five-leaf grimoire she decides to raise the devil as her son and giving him a name, Liebe. Liebe recalls how Lichita changed his life while he saved Lichita from being alone. But one day, Liebe became possessed by Lucifero, who is livid that a devil resides in the human world without making a contract with a human, and planned to him to manifest his own body. Lichita used her mana-absorbing condition to drive Lucifero out of Liebe's body, but Lucifero impaled her with his arm for interfering. With the last of her strength Lichita sealed Liebe into the five-leaf gimorie to keep him safe from Lucifero. At the abandoned house, Asta acknowledges Liebe's feelings of rage, hatred and sorrow and decides to fight him and win. Liebe proceeds takes the Demon-Dweller Sword and Demon-Destroyer Sword while Asta manages to take hold of Yami's katana and defends himself. During the fight, Liebe recalls how after he was sealed in the five-leaf gimorie he developed his Anti-Magic from spending his time cursing Lucifero and the other devils and when Asta claimed the grimoire Liebe decided to use Asta's body to take revenge against his kind by killing them all. Asta recalls friends he made and the enemies he's fought and with renewed determination defeats Liebe. Instead of enslaving Liebe through the devil-binding ritual, Asta proposes that they be friends since they have a common goal. Liebe, acknowledging that Asta is Lichita's son, accepts and the ritural is complete and Asta's arm is returned to him. The episode ends with Nacht preparing to train Asta and Liebe with his four devils, Noelle and the others getting ready to train to become stronger, the captains along with the Wizard King and Mereoleona preparing for the upcoming war, and Yuno training on his own to become stronger is then offered help by Langris.

== Music ==
The first season uses twenty-six pieces of theme music: thirteen openings and thirteen closing themes. The first opening and closing themes, which are used for the first 13 episodes, are "Distant Future" (ハルカミライ, Haruka Mirai) performed by Kankaku Piero, and "Blue Flame" (蒼い炎, Aoi Honō) performed by Itowokashi. From episodes 14 to 27, the opening and closing themes are "Paint It Black" performed by Bish, and "Amazing Dreams" performed by Swanky Dank. From episodes 28 to 39, the opening and closing themes are "Black Rover" performed by Vickeblanka, and "Black to the Dreamlight" performed by Empire (now known as ExWhyZ). For the remainder of the first part, the opening and closing themes are "Guess Who Is Back" performed by Koda Kumi, and "Four" performed by Faky. Megumi Han sang "Four" as her character, Kahono, in episode 50. The next opening and ending themes are "Reckless" (ガムシャラ, Gamushara) and "Heaven and Earth" (天上天下, Tenjō Tenge), both performed by Miyuna. The second opening and ending themes, used from episodes 65 to 76, are "Scribble Page" (落書きペイジ, Rakugaki Peiji) performed by Kankaku Piero, and "My Song My Days" performed by Solidemo with Sakura Men. The third opening theme, used from episodes 77 to 94, is "JUSTadICE" performed by Seiko Ōmori, and the ending theme used from episodes 77 to 89, is "The Path of Blooming Flowers" (花が咲く道, Hana ga Saku Michi) performed by The Charm Park. The fourth opening theme used from episodes 95 to 102 is "Sky & Blue" performed by Girlfriend, and the ending theme used from episodes 90 to 102 is "Against All Gods" performed by M-Flo. The next opening and ending themes are "Right Now" performed by Empire (now known as ExWhyZ), and "Life is a Battlefield" (人生は戦場だ, Jinsei wa Senjō da) performed by Kalen Anzai. The second opening and ending themes, used from episodes 116 to 128, are "Black Catcher" performed by Vickeblanka, and "New Page" performed by Intersection. The third opening and ending themes, used from episodes 129 to 140, are "Stories" performed by Snow Man, and "Answer" performed by Kaf. The fourth opening and ending themes, used from episodes 141 to 154, are "Everlasting Shine" (永遠に光れ, Eien ni Hikare) performed by Tomorrow X Together, and "A Walk" performed by Gakuto Kajiwara. The next opening and ending themes are "Everlasting Shine" (永遠に光れ, Eien ni Hikare) performed by Tomorrow X Together and "A Walk" performed by Gakuto Kajiwara. The second opening and ending themes, used from episodes 158 to 170, are "Grandeur" performed by Snow Man and "Beautiful" performed by Treasure.

== Home media release ==
=== Japanese ===
In Japan, Avex Pictures released the season on DVD and Blu-ray in sixteen volumes. The first volume was released on February 23, 2018, while the sixteeth was released on June 25, 2021.

Avex Pictures (Japan – Region 2 / A)
| Chapter | Episodes | Release date | Ref. |
|---|---|---|---|
| I | 1–10 | February 23, 2018 | |
| II | 11–19 | May 25, 2018 | |
| III | 20–29 | July 27, 2018 | |
| IV | 30–39 | November 26, 2018 | |
| V | 40–51 | January 25, 2019 | |
| VI | 52–63 | April 26, 2019 | |
| VII | 64–72 | July 26, 2019 | |
| VIII | 73–83 | September 27, 2019 | |
| IX | 84–90 | November 29, 2019 | |
| X | 91–102 | January 31, 2020 | |
| XI | 103–112 | April 24, 2020 | |
| XII | 113–120 | July 31, 2020 | |
| XIII | 121–129 | September 25, 2020 | |
| XIV | 130–141 | November 27, 2020 | |
| XV | 142–154 | February 26, 2021 | |
| XVI | 155–170 | June 25, 2021 | |

=== English ===
==== Part 1 ====
In North America, Crunchyroll and Funimation released the season in five volumes. The first volume was released on August 7, 2018, and the fifth volume was released on July 2, 2019. The volumes are available in standard Blu-ray and DVD combination sets, and volumes three and five are also available in limited edition sets. In the United Kingdom and Ireland, Sony Pictures UK released the first volume in DVD and Blu-ray combination sets on August 20, 2018; Manga Entertainment is handling subsequent releases. In Australasia, Universal Sony released the first part of the series on DVD on August 15, 2018, and Madman Entertainment released the rest of the season, with part two released on April 3, 2019.

Crunchyroll / Funimation (North America and Australasia – Region 1, 2, 4 / A, B); Sony Pictures UK (Part 1 only) / Manga Entertainment (British Isles – Region 1, 2, 4 / B); Universal Sony (Australasia – Part 1 only; Region 1, 2, 4)
| Part | | Episodes | Release date | | |
| Part | | Episodes | North America | British Isles | Australasia |
|---|---|---|---|---|---|
| Season 1 (retconned) | 1 | 1–10 | August 7, 2018 | August 20, 2018 | August 15, 2018 (DVD); December 4, 2019 (DVD and Blu-ray) |
| Season 1 (retconned) | 2 | 11–19 | November 6, 2018 | May 20, 2019 | April 3, 2019 |
| Season 1 (retconned) | 3 | 20–29 | January 15, 2019 | July 1, 2019 | April 3, 2019 |
| Season 1 (retconned) | 4 | 30–39 | April 9, 2019 | August 19, 2019 | June 5, 2019 |
| Season 1 (retconned) | 5 | 40–51 | July 2, 2019 | October 14, 2019 | September 18, 2019 |
| Season 1 (retconned) | Complete | 1–51 | May 26, 2020 | June 29, 2020 | August 5, 2020 |

==== Part 2 ====
In North America, Crunchyroll and Funimation released the season on Blu-ray and DVD combination sets, which was labelled as the second of the series. The first volume was released on October 1, 2019, and the fifth and final volume of the season released on June 30, 2020. The third and fifth volumes were also released in limited edition sets. Funimation also distributes the series in Australia and New Zealand via Madman Entertainment, and via Manga Entertainment in the United Kingdom and Ireland.

Crunchyroll / Funimation (North America and Australasia – Region 1, 2, 4 / A, B); Manga Entertainment (British Isles – Region 1, 2, 4 / B)
| Part | | Episodes | Release date | | |
| Part | | Episodes | North America | British Isles | Australasia |
|---|---|---|---|---|---|
| Season 2 (retconned) | 1 | 52–63 | October 1, 2019 | March 9, 2020 | December 4, 2019 |
| Season 2 (retconned) | 2 | 64–72 | January 7, 2020 | June 1, 2020 | March 4, 2020 |
| Season 2 (retconned) | 3 | 73–83 | March 3, 2020 | July 6, 2020 | May 27, 2020 |
| Season 2 (retconned) | 4 | 84–90 | May 5, 2020 | September 7, 2020 | August 5, 2020 |
| Season 2 (retconned) | 5 | 91–102 | June 30, 2020 | November 2, 2020 | October 7, 2020 |
| Season 2 (retconned) | Complete | 52–102 | December 8, 2020 | February 1, 2021 | February 17, 2021 |

==== Part 3 ====
In North America, Crunchyroll and Funimation released the season on DVD and Blu-ray combination sets, which was labelled as the third of the series. The first volume was released on October 27, 2020. The now-combined company also distributes the series in the United Kingdom and Ireland via Crunchyroll UK and Ireland, and in Australia and New Zealand via Madman Entertainment.

Crunchyroll / Funimation (North America and Australasia – Region 1, 2, 4 / A, B); Manga Entertainment (British Isles – Region 1, 2, 4 / B)
| Part | | Episodes | Release date | | |
| Part | | Episodes | North America | British Isles | Australasia |
|---|---|---|---|---|---|
| Season 3 (retconned) | 1 | 103–112 | October 27, 2020 | July 12, 2021 | January 13, 2021 |
| Season 3 (retconned) | 2 | 113–120 | February 2, 2021 | August 16, 2021 | April 10, 2021 |
| Season 3 (retconned) | 3 | 121–129 | March 30, 2021 | September 20, 2021 | June 2, 2021 |
| Season 3 (retconned) | 4 | 130–141 | June 1, 2021 | October 25, 2021 | August 8, 2021 |
| Season 3 (retconned) | 5 | 142–154 | September 14, 2021 | November 22, 2021 | November 4, 2021 |

==== Part 4 ====
In North America, Crunchyroll and Funimation released the season on DVD and Blu-ray combination sets, which was labelled as the fourth of the series. The now-combined company also distributes the series in Australia and New Zealand via Madman Entertainment, and via Manga Entertainment in the United Kingdom and Ireland.

Crunchyroll / Funimation (North America and Australasia – Region 1, 2, 4 / A, B); Manga Entertainment (British Isles – Region 1, 2, 4 / B)
| Part | Episodes | Release date | | |
| Part | Episodes | North America | British Isles | Australasia |
|---|---|---|---|---|
| Season 4 (retconned) | 155–170 | May 24, 2022 | TBA | TBA |
