= 2026 in anime =

Events in 2026 in anime.

== Releases ==
=== Films ===
A list of anime films that will be released in theaters between January 1 and December 31, 2026.

Release date	Title	Studio	Director(s)	Running time (minutes)	Ref.
January 1	Labyrinth	Sanzigen	Shōji Kawamori	115	
January 9	All You Need Is Kill	Studio 4°C	Kenichiro Akimoto	82	
January 22	Cosmic Princess Kaguya!	Studio Colorido; Studio Chromato	Shingo Yamashita	142	
January 30	Girls und Panzer: Motto Love Love Sakusen Desu! – Act 2	P.A. Works; Actas	Masami Shimoda	72	
January 30	The Keeper of the Camphor Tree	A-1 Pictures; Psyde Kick Studio	Tomohiko Itō	113	
January 30	Mobile Suit Gundam Hathaway: The Sorcery of Nymph Circe	Sunrise	Shūkō Murase	108	
February 13	Gintama: Yoshiwara in Flames	Bandai Namco Pictures	Naoya Ando	124	
February 13	The Dangers in My Heart: The Movie	Shin-Ei Animation	Hiroaki Akagi (Chief); Chen Dali	102	
February 20	Star Blazers: Space Battleship Yamato 3199: Part 5: The Incandescent Galactic War	Satelight	Harutoshi Fukui (Chief); Naomichi Yamato	101	
February 27	Doraemon: New Nobita and the Castle of the Undersea Devil	Shin-Ei Animation	Tetsuo Yajima	102	
February 27	That Time I Got Reincarnated as a Slime the Movie: Tears of the Azure Sea	Eight Bit	Yasuhito Kikuchi	112	
March 6	A New Dawn	Asmik Ace; Studio Outrigger; Miyu Productions	Yoshitoshi Shinomiya	76	
March 6	Girls und Panzer: Motto Love Love Sakusen Desu! – Act 3	P.A. Works; Actas	Masami Shimoda	72	
March 13	Paris ni Saku Étoile	Arvo Animation	Gorō Taniguchi	119	
March 20	Assassination Classroom the Movie: Our Time	Lerche	Masaki Kitamura	87	
March 27	Chimney Town: Frozen in Time	Studio 4°C	Yusuke Hirota	98	
April 10	Detective Conan: Fallen Angel of the Highway	TMS Entertainment	Takahiro Hasui	109	
April 10	Girls und Panzer: Motto Love Love Sakusen Desu! – Act 4	P.A. Works; Actas	Masami Shimoda	72	
April 24	Sound! Euphonium: The Final Movie – Part 1	Kyoto Animation	Tatsuya Ishihara (Chief); Taichi Ogawa	120	
May 8	Love Live! Hasunosora Girls' High School Idol Club Bloom Garden Party	Sublimation	Gō Kurosaki	75	
May 8	The Irregular at Magic High School: The Movie – Yotsuba Succession Arc	Eight Bit	Jimmy Stone	103	
May 29	Mononoke the Movie: The Curse of the Serpent	Studio Kafka; EOTA	Kenji Nakamura (Chief); Tomoaki Koshida	87	
June 26	New Theatrical Movie Keroro Gunsō: Upon Revival, Immediately Facing the Threat of Earth's Destruction!	Bandai Namco Pictures	Yūichi Fukuda (Chief); Fumitoshi Oizaki	109	
July 10	Shiboyugi: Playing Death Games to Put Food on the Table – 44: Cloudy Beach	Studio Deen	Souta Ueno	89	
July 10	Unanswered//butterfly: Sword Art Online	Polygon Pictures	Tadahiro “Tady” Yoshihira	110	
July 17	You, Fireworks, and Our Promise	SynergySP; The Answer Studio	Kei Suzuki	96	
July 24	Chiikawa the Movie: The Secret of the Mermaid Island	Cypic; QTORY	Kei Oikawa	99	
July 31	Crayon Shin-chan the Movie: Spooky! My Yokai Vacation	Shin-Ei Animation	Masaki Watanabe	101	
August 8	The Ribbon Hero	Outline	Yuuki Igarashi	111	
August 28	Puella Magi Madoka Magica: Walpurgisnacht: Rising	Shaft	Akiyuki Shinbo (Chief); Yukihiro Miyamoto	120	
September 4	Sekiro: No Defeat	Qzil.la	Kenichi Kutsuna	107	
September 11	Sound! Euphonium: The Final Movie – Part 2	Kyoto Animation	Tatsuya Ishihara (Chief); Taichi Ogawa	127	
September 25	We Are Aliens	Toho Next	Kōhei Kadowaki	117	
October 9	To You in the Beyond	TMS Entertainment	Junichi Wada	116	
October 9	Girls und Panzer das Finale: Part 5	Actas	Tsutomu Mizushima	55	
October 16	BanG Dream! Ave Mujica Prima Aurora	Nichicaline	Kōdai Kakimoto	58	
October 16	Rascal Does Not Dream of a Dear Friend	CloverWorks	Sōichi Masui	118	
October 23	Made in Abyss: Mezameru Shinpi	Kinema Citrus	Masayuki Kojima	71	
October 23	Maebashi Witches Emoemories: Blooming Witches	Sunrise	Junichi Yamamoto	120	
November 6	Grotesqqque	CloverWorks	Atsushi Nishigori	104	
November 13	Expelled from Paradise: Resonance from the Heart	Toei Animation	Seiji Mizushima	128	
November 20	Armored Trooper VOTOMS: Die Graue Hexe Part 1	Sunrise	Mamoru Oshii	100	
November 20	Witch on the Holy Night	Ufotable	Masashi Takeuchi	125	
November 27	Takopi's Original Sin: Thank You, See You Tomorrow	Enishiya	Shinya Iino	152	
December 11	The Apothecary Diaries: The Late Lady's Treasure	Toho Animation Studio	Norihiro Naganuma		

=== Television series ===
A list of anime television series that will debut between January 1 and December 31, 2026.

First run start and end dates	Title	Episodes	Studio	Director(s)	Original title	Ref.
January 3 – March 28	Fate/strange Fake	13	A-1 Pictures	Shun Enokido; Takahito Sakazume		
January 3 – March 26	Sentenced to Be a Hero	12	Studio Kai	Hiroyuki Takashima	Yūsha-kei ni Shosu: Chōbatsu Yūsha 9004-tai Keimu Kiroku	
January 4 – March 22	Hana-Kimi (season 1)	12	Signal.MD	Natsuki Takemura	Hanazakari no Kimitachi e	
January 4 – March 23	Ichigo Aika: Strawberry Elegy	12	Studio Hōkiboshi	Pyuta Konno	Ichigo Aika: Zatsu de Namaiki na Imōto to Warikirenai Ani	
January 4 – March 18	Jack-of-All-Trades, Party of None	12	animation studio42	Hiroyuki Kanbe	Yūsha Party o Oidasareta Kiyōbinbō	
January 4 – March 29	Journal with Witch	13	Shuka	Miyuki Oshiro	Ikoku Nikki	
January 4 – March 22	Kunon the Sorcerer Can See	13	Platinum Vision	Hideaki Ōba	Majutsu-shi Kunon wa Mieteiru	
January 4 – March 29	MF Ghost (season 3)	13	Felix Film	Tomohito Naka		
January 4 – March 29	Tamon's B-Side	13	J.C.Staff	Chika Nagaoka	Tamon-kun Ima Dotchi!?	
January 4 – March 23	The Daily Life of a Part-time Torturer	12	Diomedéa	Fumitoshi Oizaki	Gōmon Baito-kun no Nichijō	
January 5 – March 30	Golden Kamuy (season 5)	13	Brain's Base	Shizutaka Sugahara		
January 5 – March 30	My Hero Academia: Vigilantes (season 2)	13	Bones Film	Kenichi Suzuki	Vigilante: Boku no Hero Academia Illegals	
January 5 – March 23	Wash It All Away	12	Okuruto Noboru	Kenta Ōnishi	Kirei ni Shite Moraemasu ka	
January 6 – March 24	I'll Live a Long Life to Dote on My Favorite Stepbrother!	12	Imagica Infos; Imageworks Studio	Yūsuke Morishita	Saioshi no Gikei o Mederu Tame, Nagaikishimasu!	
January 6 – March 24	Isekai Office Worker: The Other World's Books Depend on the Bean Counter	12	Studio Deen	Shinji Ishihara	Isekai no Sata wa Shachiku Shidai	
January 6 – March 31	There Was a Cute Girl in the Hero's Party, So I Tried Confessing to Her	13	Gekkou	Yasutaka Yamamoto (Chief); Tomonori Mine	Yūsha Party ni Kawaii Ko ga Ita no de, Kokuhaku Shite Mita	
January 6 – March 24	Tune In to the Midnight Heart	12	Gekkou	Masayuki Takahashi	Mayonaka Heart Tune	
January 6 – March 24	Yoroi-Shinden Samurai Troopers (part 1)	12	Sunrise	Yōichi Fujita		
January 6 – March 24	You Can't Be in a Rom-Com with Your Childhood Friends!	12	Tezuka Productions	Satoshi Kuwabara	Osananajimi to wa LoveCom ni Naranai	
January 7 – March 26	A Gentle Noble's Vacation Recommendation	12	SynergySP	Kenta Noda	Odayaka Kizoku no Kyūka no Susume	
January 7 – March 25	An Adventurer's Daily Grind at Age 29	12	Hornets	Riki Fukushima	29-sai Dokushin Chūken Bōkensha no Nichijō	
January 7 – March 25	Hell Teacher: Jigoku Sensei Nube (part 2)	13	Studio Kai	Yasuyuki Ōishi	Jigoku Sensei Nube	
January 7 – March 18	Shiboyugi: Playing Death Games to Put Food on the Table	11	Studio Deen	Souta Ueno	Shibō Yūgi de Meshi o Kū	
January 7 – March 25	The Case Book of Arne	12	Silver Link	Keisuke Inoue	Arne no Jikenbo	
January 7 – April 1	The Darwin Incident	13	Bellnox Films	Naokatsu Tsuda	Darwin Jihen	
January 7 – March 25	The Demon King's Daughter Is Too Kind!!	12	EMT Squared	Masahiko Ohta	Maō no Musume wa Yasashi Sugiru!!	
January 8 – March 26	Chained Soldier (season 2)	12	Passione; Hayabusa Film	Masafumi Tamura	Mato Seihei no Slave	
January 8 – March 26	Noble Reincarnation: Born Blessed, So I'll Obtain Ultimate Power	12	CompTown	Michio Fukuda	Kizoku Tensei: Megumareta Umare kara Saikyō no Chikara o Eru	
January 8 – March 26	The Holy Grail of Eris	12	Ashi Productions	Morita to Junpei	Eris no Seihai	
January 8 – March 26	The Invisible Man and His Soon-to-Be Wife	12	Project No.9	Mitsuho Seta	Tōmei Otoko to Ningen Onna: Sonouchi Fūfu ni Naru Futari	
January 9 – March 27	Anyway, I'm Falling in Love with You (season 2)	12	Typhoon Graphics	Junichi Yamamoto	Dōse, Koishite Shimaunda	
January 9 – March 20	Champignon Witch	12	Typhoon Graphics; Qzil.la	Yōsuke Kubo	Champignon no Majo	
January 9 – March 27	High School! Kimengumi	12	Seven	Kazuaki Seki		
January 9 – March 27	Jujutsu Kaisen (season 3)	12	MAPPA	Shōta Goshozono		
January 9 – March 27	Roll Over and Die	12	A.C.G.T	Nobuharu Kamanaka	Omae Gotoki ga Maō ni Kateru to Omou na" to Yūsha Party o Tsuihō Sareta no de, Ōto de Kimama ni Kurashitai	
January 10 – March 28	Dark Moon: The Blood Altar	12	Troyca	Shōko Shiga	Dark Moon: Kuro no Tsuki – Tsuki no Saidan	
January 10 – March 28	Dead Account	12	SynergySP	Keiya Saitō		
January 10 – February 28	Does It Count If You Lose Your Virginity to an Android?	8	Nyan Pollution-ω-	Neko B	Android wa Keiken Ninzū ni Hairimasu ka??	
January 10 – March 28	Easygoing Territory Defense by the Optimistic Lord: Production Magic Turns a Nameless Village into the Strongest Fortified City	12	NAZ	Takayuki Kuriyama; Tetsuya Tatamitani	Okiraku Ryōshu no Tanoshii Ryōchi Bōei: Seisan-kei Majutsu de Na mo Nakimura o Saikyō no Jōsai Toshi ni	
January 10 – April 4	Fire Force (season 3, part 2)	13	David Production	Tatsuma Minamikawa	En'en no Shōbōtai	
January 10 – March 28	Hell Mode: The Hardcore Gamer Dominates in Another World with Garbage Balancing (season 1)	12	Yokohama Animation Laboratory	Masato Tamagawa	Hell Mode: Yarikomizuki no Gamer wa Hai Settei no Isekai de Musō Suru	
January 10 – March 28	Reincarnated as a Dragon Hatchling	12	Felix Film; Ga-Crew	Yuta Takamura	Tensei Shitara Dragon no Tamago Datta: Saikyō Igai Mezasa Nee	
January 10 – March 28	Trigun Stargaze	12	Orange	Masako Satō		
January 10 – March 14	You Don't Know Gunma Yet: Reiwa Version	12	Imagica Infos; Imageworks Studio	Tetsuya Tatamitani	Omae wa Mada Gunma o Shiranai: Reiwa-ban	
January 11 – April 5	A Misanthrope Teaches a Class for Demi-Humans	13	Asread	Akira Iwanaga	Jingai Kyōshitsu no Ningen-girai Kyōshi	
January 11 – March 29	Hell's Paradise (season 2)	12	MAPPA	Kaori Makita	Jigokuraku	
January 11 – April 5	Oedo Fire Slayer: The Legend of Phoenix	12	SynergySP	Hajime Kamegaki; Hiroshi Yasumi	Hikuidori Ushūboro Tobigumi	
January 11 – March 29	In the Clear Moonlit Dusk	12	East Fish Studio; Atelier Peuplier	Yūsuke Maruyama	Uruwashi no Yoi no Tsuki	
January 11 – March 29	Kaya-chan Isn't Scary	12	East Fish Studio	Hiroshi Ikehata	Kaya-chan wa Kowakunai	
January 11 – June 28	Scum of the Brave	24	OLM	Shinji Ushiro	Yūsha no Kuzu	
January 11 – March 29	The Villainess Is Adored by the Prince of the Neighbor Kingdom	12	Studio Deen	Takayuki Hamana	Akuyaku Reijō wa Ringoku no Ōtaishi ni Dekiai Sareru	
January 11 – March 29	You and I Are Polar Opposites (season 1)	12	Lapin Track	Takayoshi Nagatomo	Seihantai na Kimi to Boku	
January 12 – March 30	'Tis Time for "Torture," Princess (season 2)	12	Pine Jam	Yōko Kanamori	Hime-sama "Gōmon" no Jikan desu	
January 14 – March 25	Oshi no Ko (season 3)	11	Doga Kobo	Daisuke Hiramaki		
January 16 – March 27	Frieren: Beyond Journey's End (season 2)	10	Madhouse	Tomoya Kitagawa	Sōsō no Frieren	
January 25 – March 22	Medalist (season 2)	9	ENGI	Yasutaka Yamamoto		
February 1 –	Star Detective Precure!		Toei Animation	Kōji Kawasaki	Meitantei Precure!	
March 15 – May 31	Rooster Fighter	12	Sanzigen	Daisuke Suzuki	Niwatori Fighter	
March 29 – June 28	Agents of the Four Seasons: Dance of Spring	14	Wit Studio	Ken Yamamoto	Shunkashūtō Daikōsha: Haru no Mai	
April 1 – June 24	Classroom of the Elite (season 4)	16	Lerche	Noriyuki Nomata	Yōkoso Jitsuryoku Shijō Shugi no Kyōshitsu e	
April 1 – May 27	Dorohedoro (season 2)	11	MAPPA	Yuichiro Hayashi		
April 1 – June 17	Go for It, Nakamura!	13	Drive	Aoi Umeki	Ganbare! Nakamura-kun!!	
April 1 – June 24	Reborn as a Vending Machine, I Now Wander the Dungeon (season 3)	12	Studio Gokumi; AXsiZ	Takashi Yamamoto	Jidōhanbaiki ni Umarekawatta Ore wa Meikyū o Samayō	
April 1 – June 17	The Beginning After the End (season 2)	12	Studio A-Cat	Keitaro Motonaga	Saikyō no Ōsama, Nidome no Jinsei wa Nani o Suru?	
April 2 – June 18	Always a Catch!	12	Troyca	Akira Oguro	Nigashita Sakana wa Ōkikatta ga Tsuriageta Sakana ga Ōkisugita Ken	
April 2 – June 25	Dr. Stone: Science Future (part 3)	13	TMS Entertainment	Shūhei Matsushita		
April 2 – June 18	Kirio Fan Club	12	Satelight	Sō Toyama		
April 2 – July 2	The Ramparts of Ice (season 1)	14	Studio Kai	Mankyū	Koori no Jyōheki	
April 3 – June 19	Haibara's Teenage New Game+	12	Studio Comet	Misuzu Hoshino	Haibara-kun no Tsuyokute Seishun New Game	
April 3 – June 19	Killed Again, Mr. Detective?	12	Liden Films	Takashi Naoya	Mata Korosarete Shimatta no desu ne, Tantei-sama	
April 3 – June 19	Monster Eater	12	Imagica Infos; Imageworks Studio	Hikaru Satō	Mamonogurai no Bōkensha	
April 3 – June 26	Petals of Reincarnation	13	Benten Film	Shun Kudō	Reincarnation no Kaben	
April 3 – June 26	Snowball Earth	13	Studio Kai	Munehisa Sakai		
April 3 – June 26	That Time I Got Reincarnated as a Slime (season 4, part 1)	12	Eight Bit	Naokatsu Tsuda	Tensei Shitara Slime Datta Ken	
April 3 – June 19	The Angel Next Door Spoils Me Rotten (season 2)	12	Project No.9	Chihiro Kumano	Otonari no Tenshi-sama ni Itsu no Ma ni ka Dame Ningen ni Sareteita Ken	
April 4 – June 20	Akane-banashi	12	Zexcs	Ayumu Watanabe		
April 4 – October 3	Ascendance of a Bookworm: Adopted Daughter of an Archduke	24	Wit Studio	Yoshiaki Iwasaki	Honzuki no Gekokujō: Shisho ni Naru Tame ni wa Shudan o Erandeiraremasen – Ryōshu no Yōjo	
April 4 – September 19	Daemons of the Shadow Realm	24	Bones Film	Masahiro Andō	Yomi no Tsugai	
April 4 – September 26	Mao	26	Sunrise	Teruo Sato		
April 4 – June 20	The Strongest Job Is Apparently Not a Hero or a Sage, but an Appraiser (Provisional)!	12	Studio Flad	Makoto Hoshino	Saikyō no Shokugyō wa Yūsha demo Kenja demo naku Kanteishi (Kari) Rashii Desu yo?	
April 4 – September 27	Welcome to Demon School! Iruma-kun (season 4)	24	BN Pictures	Makoto Moriwaki (Chief); Ayaka Tsujihashi	Mairimashita! Iruma-kun	
April 5 – June 28	Ace of Diamond Act II (season 2, part 1)	13	OLM	Hideaki Ōba	Daiya no A Act II	
April 5 – June 21	Kusunoki's Garden of Gods	12	Juvenage	Sekijuu Sekino	Kami no Niwatsuki Kusunoki-tei	
April 5 – June 21	Magical Sisters LuluttoLilly (part 1)	12	Studio Pierrot	Shintarō Dōge	Mahō no Shimai LuluttoLilly	
April 5 – June 21	Mistress Kanan Is Devilishly Easy	12	Studio Kai	Yasushi Muroya	Kanan-sama wa Akumade Choroi	
April 5 – June 28	Needy Girl Overdose	13	Yostar Pictures	Masaoki Nakashima		
April 5 –	One Piece: Elbaph		Toei Animation	Wataru Matsumi	One Piece	
April 5 – June 21	The Food Diary of Miss Maid	12	EMT Squared; Magic Bus	Ryousuke Senbo	Maid-san wa Taberu dake	
April 6 – June 22	An Observation Log of My Fiancée Who Calls Herself a Villainess	12	Ashi Productions	Junichi Yamamoto	Jishō Akuyaku Reijō na Konyakusha no Kansatsu Kiroku	
April 6 – June 22	Do You Like Big Girls?	12	Studio Hōkiboshi	Sōta Warai	Ōkī Onnanoko wa Suki desu ka?	
April 6 – June 22	Farming Life in Another World (season 2)	12	Zero-G	Ryōichi Kuraya	Isekai Nonbiri Nōka	
April 6 – June 22	Ghost Concert: Missing Songs	12	ENGI	Masato Jinbo		
April 6 – June 22	Ingoku Danchi: Deviant’s Apartment Complex	12	Elias	Toshikatsu Tokoro		
April 6 – June 8	Marika's Love Meter Malfunction	8	Studio Leo	Sumito Sasaki	Marika-chan no Kōkando wa Bukkowarete Iru	
April 6 – June 22	The Klutzy Class Monitor and the Girl with the Short Skirt	12	Zero-G	Daiji Iwanaga	Ponkotsu Fūkiin to Skirt Take ga Futekisetsu na JK no Hanashi	
April 6 – June 22	Witch Hat Atelier	13	Bug Films	Ayumu Watanabe	Tongari Bōshi no Atelier	
April 7 – June 23	Beyond Twilight	12	Imagica Infos; Imageworks Studio	Saya Fukase	Hyakki Yakōshō	
April 7 – June 30	Even a Replica Can Fall in Love	13	Voil	Ryuichi Kimura	Replica Datte, Koi o Suru	
April 7 – June 23	I Made Friends with the Second Prettiest Girl in My Class	12	Connect	Hideki Tachibana	Class de 2-ban Me ni Kawaii Onna no Ko to Tomodachi ni Natta	
April 7 – September 29	Liar Game	26	Madhouse	Yūzō Satō (Chief); Asami Kawano		
April 7 – June 30	Marriagetoxin	13	Bones Film	Motonobu Hori		
April 7 – June 21	Nippon Sangoku: The Three Nations of the Crimson Sun	12	Studio Kafka	Kazuaki Terasawa		
April 7 – June 23	The Most Heretical Last Boss Queen: From Villainess to Savior (season 2)	12	OLM Team Yoshioka	Norio Nitta	Higeki no Genkyō to naru Saikyō Gedō Last Boss Joō wa Min no tame ni Tsukushimasu	
April 8 – July 1	Eren the Southpaw	13	Signal.MD; Production I.G	Toshimasa Suzuki	Hidarikiki no Eren	
April 8 – June 24	Gals Can't Be Kind to Otaku!?	12	TMS Entertainment	Shin Mita	Otaku ni Yasashii Gal wa Inai!?	
April 8 – June 24	My Ribdiculous Reincarnation	12	Qzil.la; S.o.K	Yasufumi Soejima	Megami "Isekai Tensei Nani ni Naritai desu ka" Ore "Yūsha no Rokkotsu de"	
April 8 – June 24	Pardon the Intrusion, I'm Home!	12	Tatsunoko Production	Itsuki Imazaki	Tadaima, Ojamasaremasu!	
April 8 – June 17	Re:Zero − Starting Life in Another World (season 4, part 1)	11	White Fox	Masahiro Shinohara	Re:Zero kara Hajimeru Isekai Seikatsu	
April 9 – June 25	Kujima: Why Sing, When You Can Warble?	12	Studio Hibari	Noriyuki Nomata	Kujima Utaeba Ie Hororo	
April 9 – June 25	The Warrior Princess and the Barbaric King	12	Jumondou	Takayuki Tanaka	Himekishi wa Barbaroi no Yome	
April 10 – June 26	A Hundred Scenes of Awajima	12	Madhouse	Morio Asaka	Awajima Hyakkei	
April 10 – September 18	Drops of God	24	Satelight	Kenji Itoso	Kami no Shizuku	
April 11 – June 27	Botan Kamiina Fully Blossoms When Drunk	12	Soigne	Takashi Sakuma	Kamiina Botan, Yoeru Sugata wa Yuri no Hana	
April 11 – June 27	Fist of the North Star	14	TMS Entertainment	Hiroshi Maeda	Hokuto no Ken: Fist of the North Star	
April 11 – June 27	Kill Blue	12	Cue	Hiro Kaburagi; Yasunori Ide	Kill Ao	
April 11 – June 27	Rent-A-Girlfriend (season 5)	12	TMS Entertainment	Kazuomi Koga	Kanojo, Okarishimasu	
April 11 – June 27	Yowayowa Sensei	12	Brain's Base	Hiroshi Ishiodori		
April 12 – June 21	Ichijyoma Mankitsu Gurashi!	11	PRA	Toshinori Watanabe		
April 12 – June 28	Mission: Yozakura Family (season 2, part 1)	12	Silver Link	Mirai Minato (Chief); Takahiro Nakatsugawa	Yozakura-san Chi no Daisakusen	
April 12 –	Odekake Kozame (season 2)		ENGI	Chihiro Kumano		
April 12 –	Shō 3 Ashibe QQ Goma-chan		DLE	Kōtarō Yamawaki		
April 12 – September 20	The Classroom of a Black Cat and a Witch	24	Liden Films	Naoyuki Tatsuwa	Kuroneko to Majo no Kyōshitsu	
April 12 – June 28	Wistoria: Wand and Sword (season 2)	12	Actas; BN Pictures	Tatsuya Yoshihara (Chief); Hideaki Nakano	Tsue to Tsurugi no Wistoria	
April 14 – June 30	I Want to End This Love Game	12	Felix Film	Azuma Tani	Aishiteru Game o Owarasetai	
June 30 – September 15	The Oblivious Saint Can't Contain Her Power	12	Magic Bus; Picante Circus	Mitsutaka Noshitani	Mujikaku Seijo wa Kyō mo Muishiki ni Chikara o Tare Nagasu	
July 1 – September 16	Heroine? Saint? No, I'm an All-Works Maid (and Proud of It)!	12	EMT Squared	Shinji Ishihira (Chief); Naoya Murakawa	Heroine? Seijo? Iie, All Works Maid Desu (Hoko)!	
July 2 – September 10	BanG Dream! Yume∞Mita	13	Nichicaline	Tomomi Umetsu	Bandori!	
July 2 – September 17	Bungo Stray Dogs Wan! (season 2)	12	Bones Film; Nomad	Toshihiro Kikuchi	Bungō Sutorei Doggusu	
July 2 – September 24	Dara-san of Reiwa	13	Asahi Production′	Masato Suzuki	Reiwa no Dara-san	
July 2 – September 17	From Overshadowed to Overpowered: Second Reincarnation of a Talentless Sage	12	EMT Squared	Hisashi Ishii	Rakudai Kenja no Gakuin Musō: Nidome no Tensei, S-Rank Cheat Majutsushi Bōkenroku	
July 2 – September 24	Hana-Kimi (season 2)	13	Signal.MD	Natsuki Takemura	Hanazakari no Kimitachi e	
July 2 – September 17	The Villager of Level 999	12	Brain's Base	Yoshinobu Kasai	Lv999 no Murabito	
July 2 – September 24	The World Is Dancing	13	Cypic	Toshimasa Kuroyanagi	Wārudo Izu Danshingu	
July 3 – September 25	Chainsmoker Cat	12	Bibury Animation Studios	Taku Kimura	Yani Neko	
July 3 – September 25	Draw This, Then Die!	12	Shin-Ei Animation	Hiroaki Akagi	Kore Kaite Shine	
July 3 – September 18	Kaiju Girl Caramelise	12	Liden Films	Teruyuki Omine	Otome Kaijū Kyaramerize	
July 3 – September 25	That Time I Got Reincarnated as a Slime (season 4, part 2)	12	Eight Bit	Naokatsu Tsuda	Tensei Shitara Slime Datta Ken	
July 3 –	The Exiled Heavy Knight Knows How to Game the System		GoHands	Shingo Suzuki (Chief); Tetsuichi Yamagishi (Chief); Katsumasa Yokomine	Tsuihō Sareta Tensei Jū Kishi wa Game Chishiki de Musō Suru	
July 4 – September 19	Black Torch	12	100studio	Kei Umabiki		
July 4 – September 26	Hell Mode: The Hardcore Gamer Dominates in Another World with Garbage Balancing (season 2)	13	Yokohama Animation Laboratory	Masato Tamagawa	Hell Mode: Yarikomizuki no Gamer wa Hai Settei no Isekai de Musō Suru	
July 4 – September 12	Jaadugar: A Witch in Mongolia	12	Science Saru	Naoko Yamada (Chief); Abel Góngora	Tenmaku no Jādūgar	
July 4 – September 19	Kamui: He's Behind You	12	Zero-G; ZG-R	Takumi Tsukumo	Ushiro no Shōmen Kamui-san	
July 4 – September 28	Mushoku Tensei: Jobless Reincarnation (season 3, part 1)	14	Studio Bind	Ryōsuke Shibuya	Mushoku Tensei III: Isekai Ittara Honki Dasu	
July 4 –	Please Excuse My Younger Brothers	24	Lay-duce	Hitoshi Nanba	Uchi no Otōto-domo ga Sumimasen	
July 4 – September 19	Recommendations from Iwamoto-senpai	12	Studio Deen	Toshifumi Kawase	Iwamoto-senpai no Suisen	
July 4 – September 21	Skeleton Knight in Another World (season 2)	12	Aura Studio	Katsumi Ono	Gaikotsu Kishi-sama, Tadaima Isekai e Odekakechū II	
July 4 – September 19	The Cat and the Dragon	12	OLM	Jin-Koo Oh	Neko to Ryū	
July 5 – September 27	Grow Up Show: Sunflower Circus	13	A-1 Pictures; Psyde Kick Studio	Kanta Kamei	Grow Up Show: Himawari no Circus-dan	
July 5 – September 20	Iron Wok Jan	12	Troyca	Ei Aoki	Tetsunabe no Jan!	
July 5 – September 27	Let's Go Kaikigumi	12	C-Station	Yutaka Hirata	Rettsu Gō Kaikigumi	
July 5 – September 20	Magical Girl Lyrical Nanoha Exceeds Gun Blaze Vengeance	12	Seven Arcs	Takayuki Hamana	Mahō Shōjo Ririkaru Nanoha EXCEEDS Gun Blaze Vengeance	
July 5 – September 27	Magilumiere Magical Girls Inc. (season 2)	12	J.C.Staff	Toshinori Fukushima	Kabushiki Gaisha Magilumiere	
July 5	One Piece: Heroines	1	Toei Animation	Haruka Kamatani		
July 5 – September 20	Rich Girl Caretaker: I'm Secretly the Caregiver of the Most Popular Girl in This Rich Kid School	12	Brain's Base	Shūsei Morishita	Saijo no Osewa	
July 5 – September 27	Sparks of Tomorrow	13	Kyoto Animation	Minoru Ōta	20 Seiki Denki Mokuroku: Eureka Evlika	
July 5 – September 20	The 100 Girlfriends Who Really, Really, Really, Really, Really Love You (season 3)	12	Bibury Animation Studios	Hikaru Sato	Kimi no Koto ga Dai Dai Dai Dai Daisuki na 100-nin no Kanojo	
July 5 – September 20	The Duke's Son Claims He Won't Love Me yet Showers Me with Adoration	12	Zero-G; Grass	Hitoyuki Matsui	"Kimi o Koi Suru Ki wa Nai" to Itta Jiki Kōshaku-sama ga Nazeka Dekiai Shitekimasu	
July 5 – September 20	The Ogre's Bride	12	Colored Pencil Animation Japan	Kazuhito Ōmiya	Oni no Hanayome	
July 5 – September 20	The World's Strongest Rearguard	12	Maho Film	Yūji Yanase	Sekai Saikyō no Kōei: Meikyūkoku no Shinjin Tansakusha	
July 5 – October 4	You and I Are Polar Opposites (season 2)	12	Lapin Track	Takayoshi Nagatomo	Seihantai na Kimi to Boku	
July 6 – September 21	A Livid Lady's Guide to Getting Even: How I Crushed My Homeland with My Mighty Grimoires	12	Studio Comet	Naoyuki Kuzuya	Buchigire Reijō wa Hōfuku wo Chikaimashita: Madōsho no Chikara de Sokoku wo Tataki Tsubushimasu	
July 6 – September 21	Azur Lane: Slow Ahead! (season 2)	12	Candy Box	Shunji Maki	Azur Lane: Bisoku Zenshin! Ni!!	
July 6 – September 21	Goodbye, Lara	12	Kinema Citrus	Takushi Koide	Sayonara Lara	
July 6 – September 21	Honō no Tōkyūjo: Dodge Danko	12	Cue	Hiroshi Ikehata		
July 6 – September 21	I Became a Legend After My 10 Year-Long Last Stand	12	Gekkou	Hiroyuki Kanbe	Koko wa Ore ni Makasete Saki ni Ike to Itte kara 10-nen ga Tattara Densetsu ni Natteita	
July 6 – September 21	Love Unseen Beneath the Clear Night Sky	12	Makaria	Joe Yoshizaki	Tōmei na Yoru ni Kakeru Kimi to, Me ni Mienai Koi o Shita	
July 6 – September 21	Oh Boy, Was I Wrong About Her	12	Project No.9	Chuan Feng Xu	Tenkō-saki no Seiso Karen na Bishōjo ga, Mukashi Danshi to Omotte Issho ni Asonda Osananajimi Datta Ken	
July 6 – September 21	The Forsaken Saintess and Her Foodie Roadtrip in Another World	12	EMT Squared	Atsushi Nigorikawa	Suterare Seijo no Isekai Gohantabi: Kakure Skill de Camping Car o Shōkan Shimashita	
July 6 – September 21	The Insipid Prince's Furtive Grab for the Throne	12	Maho Film	Yūji Yanase	Saikyō Degarashi Ōji no Anyaku Teii Arasoi	
July 7 – September 22	Grand Blue Dreaming (season 3)	12	Zero-G; Saber Works	Shinji Takamatsu	Grand Blue	
July 7 – September 29	I Want to Love You Till Your Dying Day	13	Roll2	Yasushi Tomoda	Kimi ga Shinu made Koi o Shitai	
July 7 – September 22	Saved by the Ice Cold Prince's Embrace	12	Imagica Infos; Imageworks Studio	Yūsuke Morishita	Migawari Reijō o Sukutta no wa Reikoku Mujihi na Kōri no Ōji no Ai Deshita	
July 7 – September 8	The Ghost in the Shell	10	Science Saru	Moko-chan	Kōkaku Kidōtai The Ghost in the Shell	
July 7 – September 22	Yoroi-Shinden Samurai Troopers (part 2)	12	Sunrise	Yōichi Fujita		
July 7 – September 22	Young Ladies Don't Play Fighting Games	12	Diomedéa	Shōta Ihata	Tai Ari Deshita: Ojō-sama wa Kakutō Game Nante Shinai	
July 8 – September 30	Clevatess (season 2)	13	Lay-duce	Kiyotaka Taguchi	Clevatess II: Majū no Ō to Akago to Shikabane no Yūsha	
July 8 – September 23	From Old Country Bumpkin to Master Swordsman (season 2)	12	Passione; Hayabusa Film	Akio Kazumi	Katainaka no Ossan, Kensei ni Naru II	
July 8 – September 26	My Stepmother and Stepsisters Aren't Wicked	12	Newon	Keisuke Inoue	Ibitte Konai Gibo to Gishi	
July 8 – September 23	Perfect Addiction	12	Imagica Infos; Imageworks Studio	Akashi Uozomi	Pāfekuto Adikushon	
July 8 –	Red River		Tatsunoko Production	Kōsuke Kobayashi	Sora wa Akai Kawa no Hotori	
July 8 – September 23	Trapped in a Dating Sim: The World of Otome Games Is Tough for Mobs (season 2)	12	ENGI	Kazuya Miura	Otome Game Sekai wa Mob ni Kibishii Sekai Desu 2	
July 8 – September 2	Victoria of Many Faces	9	Studio Deen	Nobukage Kimura	Tefuda ga Ōme no Victoria	
July 8 – September 23	Yōjo Senki: Saga of Tanya the Evil (season 2)	12	NUT	Takayuki Yamamoto	Yōjo Senki II	
July 9 – September 24	Mebius Dust	12	Doga Kobo	Tarou Iwasaki	Mebiusu Dasuto	
July 9 – September 25	Smoking Behind the Supermarket with You	12	Asahi Production	Masato Suzuki; Aoi Mori	Super no Ura de Yani Sū Futari	
July 9 – October 1	Thunder 3	12	Unend	Hiroyuki Seshita (Chief); Keisuke Ide	Sandā Surī	
July 10 – September 25	The Frontier Lord Begins with Zero Subjects	12	animation studio42	Kenichi Imaizumi	Ryōmin 0-nin Start no Henkyō Ryōshu-sama	
July 12 – September 26	Hanaori-san Still Wants to Fight in the Next Life	12	Liden Films	Hideyo Yamamoto	Hanaori-san wa Tensei Shite mo Kenka ga Shitai	
July 12 – September 20	Though I Am an Inept Villainess (part 1)	11	Doga Kobo	Mitsue Yamazaki	Futsutsuka na Akujo de wa Gozaimasu ga: Sūgū Chōso Torikae Den	
July 17 – October 2	The Elusive Samurai (season 2)	12	CloverWorks	Yuta Yamazaki	Nige Jōzu no Wakagimi	
July 25 – October 27	Bleach: Thousand-Year Blood War (part 4)	10	Pierrot Films	Tomohisa Taguchi (Chief); Hikaru Murata	Bleach: Sennen Kessen-hen	
August 12 – September 30	Re:Zero − Starting Life in Another World (season 4, part 2)	8	White Fox	Masahiro Shinohara	Re:Zero kara Hajimeru Isekai Seikatsu	
September 27 –	As a Reincarnated Aristocrat, I'll Use My Appraisal Skill to Rise in the World (season 3)		GeyeG Pictures	Takao Kato	Tensei Kizoku, Kantei Skill de Nariagaru	
October 1 –	FX Fighter Kurumi-chan		Passione	Yuki Ogawa	FX Senshi Kurumi-chan	
October 1 –	The Prince of Tennis II: U-17 World Cup Finals Members Decisive Match		M.S.C	Yoshinobu Tokumoto	Shin Tennis no Ōji-sama U-17 World Cup Kesshō Member Ketteisen	
October 1 –	The Ramparts of Ice (season 2)		Studio Kai	Mankyū	Koori no Jyōheki	
October 2 –	Overgeared		J.C.Staff	Ayako Kōno	Tempal: Item no Chikara	
October 2 –	The Apothecary Diaries (season 3, part 1)		OLM	Akinori Fudesaka	Kusuriya no Hitorigoto	
October 2 –	Tougen Anki: Nikko Kegon Falls Arc		Studio Hibari	Ato Nonaka	Tougen Anki: Nikkō Kegon no Taki Hen	
October 2 –	Welsh & Shedar	12	Studio Massket	Naoki Horiuchi	Aoki Denshō Welsh & Shedar	
October 2 –	With Vengeance, Sincerely, Your Broken Saintess (season 2)		Imagica Infos; Imageworks Studio	Saya Fukase	Kizu Darake Seijo Yori Hōfuku o Komete	
October 3 –	A Tale of the Secret Saint		Felix Film	Tomoe Makino	Tensei Shita Daiseijo wa, Seijo de Aru Koto o Hitakakusu	
October 3 –	A Wild Last Boss Appeared! (season 2)		Wao World	Yūya Horiuchi	Yasei no Last Boss ga Arawareta!	
October 3 –	Black Clover (season 2)		Studio Pierrot	Ayataka Tanemura		
October 3 –	#I'm Looking For a Zombie		Studio Comet	Shinya Une	#Zombie Sagashitemasu	
October 3 –	Sirotan		Lesprit	Arisa Okada		
October 3 –	Sgt. Frog☆		BN Pictures	Nobuhiro Kondo (Chief); Akihiko Sano	Keroro Gunsō☆	
October 3 –	Suikoden: The Anime		Konami Animation	Yūzō Satō	Gensō Suikoden	
October 3 –	The Seven Knights of the Marronnier Kingdom		J.C.Staff	Kiyoko Sayama	Marronnier Ōkoku no Shichinin no Kishi	
October 3 –	Tokyo Revengers: War of the Three Titans Arc		Liden Films	Maki Kodaira	Tokyo Revengers: Santen Sensō-hen	
October 3 –	Vertex Force		SMDE	Kazuhiro Takamura		
October 4 –	Aoashi (season 2)		TMS Entertainment	Kazuki Yokoyama		
October 4 –	Blue Box (season 2)		Electric Circus	Daisuke Sakō	Ao no Hako	
October 4 –	Even the Student Council Has Its Holes!		Passione	Naoyuki Tatsuwa	Seitokai ni mo Ana wa Aru!	
October 4 –	Even Though I'm a Super Timid Noble Girl, I Accepted the Bet from My Cunning Fiancé		Jumondou	Nobuaki Nakanishi	Yowaki MAX Reijō nanoni, Ratsuwan Konyakusha-sama no Kake ni Notte Shimatta	
October 4 –	Hotel Inhumans (season 2)		Bridge; Aisle	Tetsurō Amino		
October 4 –	Magic Repo Man: Dumped by My Party, I'll Cash In With a Cute Support Fairy to Become the Strongest!		SynergySP	Takahiro Tamano	Kashita Maryoku wa "Ribo-barai" de Kyōsei Chōshū	
October 4 –	Magical★Explorer		White Fox	Kazuki Ohashi	Magical Explorer: Eroge no Yūjin Chara ni Tensei Shita kedo, Game Chishiki Tsukatte Jiyū ni Ikiru	
October 4 –	Magical Sisters LuluttoLilly (part 2)		Studio Pierrot	Shintarō Dōge	Mahō no Shimai LuluttoLilly	
October 4 –	Ranma ½ (season 3)		MAPPA	Kōnosuke Uda		
October 4 –	Reborn as a Space Mercenary: I Woke Up Piloting the Strongest Starship!		Studio A-Cat	Norihiko Nagahama	Mezametara Saikyō Sōbi to Uchūsen Mochi Datta no de, Ikkodate Mezashite Yōhei Toshite Jiyū ni Ikitai	
October 4 –	Tank Chair		Polygon Pictures	Tadahiro Yoshihira; Hiroaki Ando	Sensha Isu: Tanku Chair	
October 4 –	Tanuki to Kitsune		Akatsuki Media Studio	Tommy Hino		
October 4 –	Uncle's Obsession with Cute Things		Liden Films	Tomoe Makino	Ojisan wa Kawaii Mono ga Osuki	
October 5 –	From Far Away		Studio Deen	Noriyuki Abe	Kanata kara	
October 5 –	Hello, I am a Witch, and My Crush Wants Me to Make a Love Potion!		Diomedéa	Keizō Kusakawa	Dōmo, Suki na Hito ni Horegusuri o Iraisareta Majo desu	
October 5 –	I'm Dating a Dark Summoner		AtoriE	Seiya Miyajima	Dark Summoner to Dekiteiru	
October 5 –	My Girlfriend's Friend		Quad	Takashi Andō	Kanojo no Tomodachi	
October 5 –	Psyren		Satelight	Katsumi Ono		
October 5 –	Romelia War Chronicle (part 1)		Atra	Kōji Saitō	Romelia Senki	
October 5 –	So What's Wrong with Getting Reborn as a Goblin?		Bakkka	Ryūta Kawahara	Tensei Goblin dakedo Shitsumon Aru?	
October 5 –	The Lonely Snow Widow and the Cursed Ring		Studio Hōkiboshi	Kazuomi Koga	Hitozukiai ga Nigate na Mibōjin no Yukionna-san to Noroi no Yubiwa	
October 6 –	Battle Spirits [Re] Zekkai no Kū		BN Pictures	Masashi Kudo		
October 6 –	Magical Girl Raising Project: Restart		SynergySP	Hiroyuki Hashimoto	Mahō Shōjo Ikusei Keikaku: Restart	
October 6 –	Nia Liston: The Merciless Maiden		Konami Animation	Motoki Nakanishi	Kyōran Reijō Nia Liston: Byōjaku Reijō ni Tenseishita Kami-goroshi no Bujin no Kareinaru Musō Roku	
October 6 –	Super Psychic Policeman Chojo		Arvo Animation	Junichi Yamamoto	Chōjun! Chōjō Senpai	
October 6 –	The Cold Sato-san Is Only Sweet to Me		Tezuka Productions	Fumihiro Yoshimura	Shiotaiō no Satō-san ga Ore ni Dake Amai	
October 7 –	Magic Knight Rayearth		E&H Production	Yui Miura		
October 7 –	Sasaki and Peeps (season 2)		Silver Link	Yūshi Ibe	Sasaki to Pii-chan	
October 7 –	The Detective Is Already Dead (season 2)		ENGI	Manabu Kurihara	Tantei wa Mō, Shindeiru	
October 7 –	The Laid-Off Cheat-Granting Mage Enjoys a Second Lease on Life		P.A. Works	Shū Honma	Tsuihō Sareta Cheat Fuyo Majutsushi wa Kimamana Second Life o Ōka Suru	
October 7 –	The World's Strongest Witch		Bridge; Aisle	Jōji Furuta	Sekai Saikyō no Majo, Hajimemashita	
October 8 –	A Returner's Magic Should Be Special (season 2)		Arvo Animation	Taishi Kawaguchi	Kikansha no Mahō wa Tokubetsu Desu	
October 8 –	Dandivine		Liden Films; Kayac Animation	Yi Cao	Jyuō Mujin Dandivine	
October 8 –	Reincarnated as a Sword (season 2)		C2C	Shinji Ishihira	Tensei Shitara Ken Deshita	
October 8 –	The Iceblade Sorcerer Shall Rule the World (season 2)		Zero-G	Masahiro Takata	Hyōken no Majutsushi ga Sekai o Suberu II	
October 9 –	Firefly Wedding		David Production	Takahiro Kamei	Hotaru no Yomeiri	
October 9 –	Tetsuryō! Meet with Tetsudō Musume		East Fish Studio	Misuzu Hoshino		
October 10 –	A Certain Dark Item		J.C.Staff	Tatsuyuki Nagai	Toaru Anbu no Item	
October 10 –	Horror Collector	12	Studio Palette	Yuki Inaba	Kyōfu Collector	
October 10 –	The Vermilion Mask (part 1)		100studio	Tetsuaki Watanabe	Shuiro no Kamen	
October 11 –	Ace of Diamond Act II (season 2, part 2)		OLM	Hideaki Ōba	Daiya no A Act II	
October 11 –	Dragon Ball Super: Beerus		Toei Animation	Matsuto Seya		
October 11 –	Full Clearing Another World Under a Goddess with Zero Believers		Hornets	Riki Fukushima	Shinja Zero no Megami-sama to Hajimeru Isekai Kōryaku	
October 11 –	Mission: Yozakura Family (season 2, part 2)		Silver Link	Mirai Minato (Chief); Takahiro Nakatsugawa	Yozakura-san Chi no Daisakusen	
October 13 –	Chitose Is in the Ramune Bottle (part 2)		Feel	Yūji Tokuno	Chitose-kun wa Ramune Bin no Naka	
October 14 –	Dark Machine: The Animation		Production +h.	Kazumi Terada		
October 25	My Happy Marriage (special)	3	Kinema Citrus	Takehiro Kubota	Watashi no Shiawase na Kekkon: Tokubetsu-hen	
December	Spirit Circle	18	Nagomi; EOTA	Tatsuo Sato		

=== Original video animations ===
A list of original video animations that will debut between January 1 and December 31, 2026.

First run start and end dates	Title	Episodes	Studio	Director(s)	Original title	Ref.
March 27	The Idolmaster Million Live!	1	Shirogumi	Shinya Watada		

=== Original net animations ===
A list of original net animations that will debut between January 1 and December 31, 2026.

First run start and end dates	Title	Episodes	Studio	Director(s)	Original title	Ref.
January 15	Love Through a Prism	20	Wit Studio	Kazuto Nakazawa; Tetsuya Takahashi; Saki Fujii	Prism Rondo	
February 26 – June 18	Baki-Dou	25	TMS Entertainment	Toshiki Hirano		
March 7	Beastars (season 3, part 2)	12	Orange	Shinichi Matsumi		
March 19 –	Steel Ball Run: JoJo's Bizarre Adventure		David Production	Yasuhiro Kimura; Hideya Takahashi; Toshiyuki Kato	Steel Ball Run: JoJo no Kimyō na Bōken	
April 16	Dandelion	7	NAZ	Daisuke Mataga		
July 19	Cyborg 009: Nemesis	3	Arect	Hideki Ambo		
August 5	Star Wars: Visions Presents – The Ninth Jedi	8	Production I.G	Kenji Kamiyama (Chief); Shunsuke Tada		
September 5 – September 26	Kaiju No. 8 Narumi's Weekday	4	Production I.G	Shigeyuki Miya	Kaijū Hachigō Narumi no Heijitsu	
September 27 –	Umayuru: Full Gate!		AtoriE	Seiya Miyajima		
October 20	Cyberpunk: Edgerunners 2	10	Trigger	Kai Ikarashi		
November 6 –	Devils' Crest		Production I.G	Shinji Ushiro (Chief); Kenichirō Komaya	Demons' Crest	
November 26	Fool Night		Sunrise; Shaft	Atsushi Yukawa		
December 23 –	Disney Twisted-Wonderland: The Animation (season 2)	8	Yumeta Company; Graphinica	Takahiro Natori (Chief); Shin Katagai		

== Deaths ==
=== January ===
- January 20: Kōzō Shioya, Japanese voice actor (voice of Majin Buu in Dragon Ball), dies from a cerebral hemorrhage at age 70-71.
- January 23: Hiroyuki Kawasaki, Japanese scriptwriter (2008 Blade of the Immortal series, Ryoko's Case File, Silent Möbius, After War Gundam X, Sakura Wars), dies at age 60.
- January 31: Masaru Ikeda, Japanese voice actor (voice of Yatter Machines in Yatterman, General Revil in Mobile Suit Gundam, Ondron in Invincible Robo Trider G7, Jamitov Hyman in Mobile Suit Zeta Gundam, Maj. Inge Riemann in Armored Trooper Votoms: The Red Shoulder Document: Roots of Ambition, Huang in Darker than Black, Koreyoshi Kitamura in Death Note), dies from heart failure caused by a heart attack at age 83.

=== February ===
- February 11: James Van Der Beek, American actor (English dub voice of Pazu in Castle in the Sky), dies from colorectal cancer at age 48.
- February 16: Hideaki Hatta, Japanese businessman (co-founder and president of Kyoto Animation), dies at age 76.
- February 20: Nozomi Aoki, Japanese composer and arranger (Galaxy Express 999, Fist of the North Star, Akuma-kun, Patalliro!), dies at age 94.
- February 22: Reiko Katsura, Japanese voice actress (voice of Ikura Namino, Kaori Ozora, and Rika Nozawa in Sazae-san, O-jirō in Shin Obake no Q-Tarō, Omotchama in Yatterman, Sayo-chan in Ikkyū-san, Kiyo-chan in Fuku-chan, Harumi in Dororon Enma-kun, Alois in Dog of Flanders, Kasumi in Cat Eyed Boy, Namino Daisuke in Akado Suzunosuke), dies from respiratory failure caused by aspiration pneumonia at age 89.

=== March ===
- March 3: Masako Ikeda, Japanese voice actress (voice of Maetel in Galaxy Express 999 and Harlock Saga, Fuyuka Liqueur in Silent Möbius, Reika "Madame Butterfly" Ryuuzaki in Aim for the Ace!, Sharon in Space Brothers, Hi no Tori/Phoenix in Phoenix (Phoenix: Karma Chapter, Yamato Chapter, and Space Chapter), Margaret "Marmee" March in the Little Women TV special, narrator in Kon'nichiwa Anne: Before Green Gables, Barbapapa, and Katanagatari, Chimera Ant Queen in Hunter × Hunter (2011 TV series)), dies from a cerebral hemorrhage at age 87.
- March 4: Michael Donovan, Canadian voice actor (voice of Master Roshi in Dragon Ball, Zouken Mato in Fate/Zero, Suikotsu in Inuyasha, Ryoga Hibiki and Jusenkyo Guide in Ranma ½, Cye Mouri and Sage Date in Ronin Warriors, Dirt Boss, Crosswise, and Primus in Transformers: Cybertron), dies at age 72.
- March 5: Yonehiko Kitagawa, Japanese voice actor (voice of Akuma Shogun, The Mountain, Harabote Muscle, and Big the Budou in the 1983 Kinnikuman series, the King of Atlas in 30,000 Miles Under the Sea, Anderson in Gatchaman, Harako's Butler in Magical Taruruto-kun Moero! Yūjō no Mahō Taisen), dies from pneumonia at age 94.
- March 6: Tsutomu Shibayama, Japanese businessman (co-founder and former president and CEO of Ajiado) and director (Doraemon 1979 anime and films, Chibi Maruko-chan, Nintama Rantarō, Ranma ½), dies from lung cancer at age 84.
- March 9: Yukie Maeda, Japanese voice actress (voice of Sōsō Mōtoku/Karin in Koihime Musō, Carlos in Transformers: Armada, Ino in Kamichu!), dies at age 52.
- March 23: Shinichiro Sato, Japanese musician and drummer of The Pillows (provided music for the soundtracks of FLCL, BECK: Mongolian Chop Squad, Moonlight Mile, Ahiru no Sora, Lucifer and the Biscuit Hammer), dies from esophageal cancer.

=== April ===
- April 10: Yohsuke Tamori, Japanese manga author (PopoloCrois), dies at age 74.
- April 14: Kazuo Ebisawa, Japanese art director and background artist (Today's Menu for the Emiya Family, Demon Slayer: Kimetsu no Yaiba, Fate/Zero, Fate/stay night: Unlimited Blade Works, GYO: Tokyo Fish Attack, Master of Mosquiton, God Eater, Tales of Zestiria the X), dies.
- April 18: Wakana Yamazaki, Japanese voice actress (voice of Ran Mouri in Case Closed, Maki Akamine in Captain Tsubasa J, Meiko Akizuki in Marmalade Boy, Ruri-hime in Mononoke, Koan in Sailor Moon R, Nene in Samurai Warriors, Nojiko in One Piece), dies at age 61.
- April 24: Tatsuo Sato, Japanese anime director and writer (Martian Successor Nadesico, Bodacious Space Pirates, Cat Soup), dies from liver failure at age 61.
- April 25: Bill Wise, American voice actor (English dub voice of Bunta Fujiwara in New Initial D the Movie, Richart Guyot in Guyver: The Bioboosted Armor, Hayato Jin in Getter Robo Armageddon, Sakon Suzuki in Moeyo Ken, Rail Claymore in Lost Universe, Knuckles the Echidna in Sonic the Hedgehog: The Movie), dies at age 61.

=== May ===
- May 4: Yuji Ohno, Japanese composer and musician (Lupin the Third), dies at age 84.
- May 6: Keiko Okamoto, Japanese manga artist (Corrector Yui), dies from a cerebral hemorrhage.
- May 14: Takahiro Fujiwara, Japanese voice actor (voice of Kurogiri in My Hero Academia, Kan Jou in Kingdom, Zenzō Inukai in Laughing Under the Clouds, Jerome Guizbatt in Bleach: Thousand-Year Blood War, Bol Gil Bol in Bastard!! Heavy Metal, Dark Fantasy, Pippin in Berserk: The Golden Age Arc and Berserk: The Golden Age Arc - Memorial Edition, Eikichi Nebuya in Kuroko's Basketball, Goichi Shima in Shinkansen Henkei Robo Shinkalion Z, Japanese dub voice of Marshmallow in Frozen), dies at age 43.
- May 21: Jun Hashimoto, Japanese lyricist (Galaxy Express 999, Lupin III: The Castle of Cagliostro), dies from liver cirrhosis at age 86.

=== June ===
- June 4: Hiromitsu Morita, Japanese animator and director (Sazae-san, Heart Cocktail, Kobo-chan, Ijiwaru Baasan, Cello-Hiki no Gauche, The World of Narue, Tegami, Ashita Kirarin), dies.
- June 16: Daveigh Chase, American actress (English dub voice of Chihiro Ogino in Spirited Away), dies from sepsis at age 35.
- June 20: Akihiro Miwa, Japanese actor and singer (voice of Queen of the Night in Maeterlinck's Blue Bird, Froy in Harmagedon, Moro in Princess Mononoke, Witch of the Waste in Howl's Moving Castle, Arceus in Pokémon: Arceus and the Jewel of Life), dies at age 91.

=== July ===
- July 3: Yukiko Nikaido, Japanese actress and voice actress (voice of Fujiko Mine in Lupin the 3rd Part I, Marco in 3000 Leagues in Search of Mother, Sugaru in Kamui), dies at age 87.
- July 27: Phyllida Law, Scottish actress (English dub voice of Sadako in the Optimum dub of Arrietty), dies at age 94.

=== August ===
- August 25: Tim Curry, English actor and singer (English dub voice of the Cat King in The Cat Returns), dies at age 80.
- August 26: Toshio Masuda, Japanese director and screenwriter (Space Battleship Yamato, Future War 198X, Odin: Photon Sailer Starlight), dies at age 98.

=== September ===
- September 9: Mike McFarland, American voice actor and ADR director (voice of Master Roshi in Dragon Ball, Buggy the Clown in One Piece, Jean Kirstein in Attack on Titan), dies from glioblastoma at age 56.
- September 18: Sō Kuramoto, Japanese playwright and screenwriter (Zero-sen Hayato), dies from multiple organ failure at age 91.
- September 26: Asami Yaguchi, Japanese voice actress (voice of Kuchipatchi in Tamagotchi!, Katina Tarask in Super Robot Wars Original Generation: Divine Wars and Super Robot Wars Original Generation: The Inspector, Tarlant in Fantastic Children, Eleonore Von Wittenburg in Dies Irae, young Gintoki Sakata in Gintama, Haruo in Doraemon, Kosuke Kitayama in Net Ghost PiPoPa), dies from heart failure at age 47.
- September 28: Naoki Bandō, Japanese voice actor (voice of Robonyan and various characters in Yo-kai Watch, Torenov Y. Minovsky in Mobile Suit Gundam: The Origin, Silverion in The Brave of Gold Goldran, Guard Star in The Brave Fighter of Sun Fighbird, Kintetsu Oosawagi in Urayasu Tekkin Kazoku, Vargas Dyson in Mobile Suit Gundam AGE, Gato in Naruto, Centichoro in One Punch Man), dies at age 68.
- September 29: Toyoto Kogisu, Japanese scriptwriter (Case Closed), dies at age 69.
- September 30:
  - Peppino Mazzullo, Italian actor and voice actor (Italian dub voice of the titular character in Topo Gigio), dies at age 100.
  - Kenichirō Katsura, Japanese animator and director (Macross 7, Synduality: Noir), dies at age 59 while undergoing medical treatment for an illness.

=== October ===
- October 11: Hiroshi Tsuchida, Japanese actor and voice actor (voice of Grisha Yeager in Attack on Titan, Koichiro Iketani in New Initial D the Movie, Hyui in Fist of the North Star: Legend of Yuria, J.J. Sexton in Mobile Suit Gundam Thunderbolt and Mobile Suit Gundam Thunderbolt: December Sky, Nadim Samaya in Mobile Suit Gundam: The Witch from Mercury, Professor Sycamore in Pokémon, Kurumi Risu Father in Sylvanian Families: Mini Story, Susumu Yamazaki in Space Battleship Yamato 2199, Trainer Okita in Umamusume Pretty Derby: Road to the Top), dies from heart failure at age 54.
- October 14: Michael Forest, American actor (voice of Kubota in the Bandai Visual dub of Ghost in the Shell: Stand Alone Complex, Alex Rosewater in The Big O, Kojima in Mobile Suit Gundam: The 08th MS Team, Braya in Eureka Seven, Takeshi Kusumi in Patlabor WXIII, Dr. Seijiro Inui in Paprika), dies at age 97.
- October 20:
  - Ryūji Nakagi, Japanese voice actor (voice of Gōzō Yūtenji in Yawara! A Fashionable Judo Girl, Tokuo Nakagawa in Oishinbo, Rupert in Master Keaton, Sakuma in Patlabor, Seiji in The Silent Service, Krusenstern in Legend of the Galactic Heroes), dies from pneumonia at age 89.
  - Sandy Frank, American television producer and distributor (Battle of the Planets, G-Force: Guardians of Space), dies at age 97.
- October 22: Tetsuya Chiba, Japanese manga artist (Ashita no Joe), dies from myelodysplastic syndrome at age 87.
- October 25: Eric Bauza, Canadian voice actor (voice of Kenjirō Takōda in The Fable, Zigita Zogi the One Thousand and First in Ishura, Amadeus Cho in Avengers Confidential: Black Widow & Punisher, Two-Face in Batman Ninja, Ezekiel Stane and Technovore in Iron Man: Rise of Technovore), dies from hypertensive heart disease at age 46.
- October 28:
  - Patrick Stewart, English actor (English dub voice of Lord Yupa in Nausicaä of the Valley of the Wind, Lloyd Steam in Steamboy), dies from complications from Alzheimer's disease and Lewy body dementia at age 86.
  - Yoshio Obara, Japanese recording engineer and sound mixer (In This Corner of the World, Summer Wars, Wolf Children), dies.
