= Perfect Addiction =

Japanese manga series

- Second tankōbon volume cover

パーフェクトアディクション (Pāfekuto Adikushon)
- Genre: Boys' love
- Manga
- Written by: Kaoruko Miyama
- Published by: Kaiohsha
- English publisher: NA: Seven Seas Entertainment
- Imprint: Gush Comics
- Magazine: Gush
- Original run: April 7, 2022 – present
- Volumes: 4
- Anime television series
- Directed by: Akashi Uozomi
- Written by: Izumi Tezuka
- Music by: Midori Narikiyo
- Studio: Imagica Infos; Imageworks Studio
- Licensed by: OceanVeil: SEA: Medialink
- Original network: tvk
- Original run: July 8, 2026 – September 23, 2026
- Episodes: 12

Perfect Addiction (Japanese: パーフェクトアディクション, Hepburn: Pāfekuto Adikushon) is a Japanese manga series written and illustrated by Kaoruko Miyama. It has been serialized in Kaiohsha's Gush boys' love magazine since April 2022 and has been collected in four tankōbon volumes. A "light anime" television series adaptation produced by Imagica Infos and Imageworks Studio aired from July to September 2026.

== Plot ==
Akihito and Sae are two college students who are popular with women, but Akihito notices that Sae has never dated his admirers. After Sae confides to Akihito that he is gay and has struggled to orgasm during sex, the pair start a sexual relationship, but experience tension and conflict due to their differing attitudes toward love and commitment.

== Characters ==
Akihito Kuji (久慈明仁, Kuji Akihito)
Voiced by: Yōhei Azakami
Sae Takatsuki (高槻冴, Takatsuki Sae)
Voiced by: Soma Saito

== Media ==
=== Manga ===
Written and illustrated by Kaoruko Miyama, Perfect Addiction began serialization in Kaiohsha's Gush boys' love magazine on April 7, 2022. Its chapters have been collected into four tankōbon volumes as of March 2026.

In June 2025, Seven Seas Entertainment announced that they had licensed the series for English publication beginning in February 2026.

No.	Original release date	Original ISBN	North American release date	North American ISBN
1	February 9, 2023	978-4-7964-1574-3	February 3, 2026	979-8-89561-850-9
2	February 8, 2024	978-4-7964-1640-5	July 21, 2026	979-8-89561-851-6
3	March 10, 2025	978-4-7964-1724-2	December 22, 2026	979-8-89765-122-1
4	March 10, 2026	978-4-7964-1805-8	—	—

=== Anime ===
A "light anime" adaptation produced by AnimationID under the boys' love label Balloon was announced on February 20, 2026. It was later confirmed to be a television series that is animated by Imagica Infos and Imageworks Studio and directed by Akashi Uozomi, with Izumi Tezuka handling series composition and Midori Narikiyo composing the music. It aired on tvk from July 8 to September 23, 2026. The ending theme song is "Addicted" performed by Yōhei Azakami and Soma Saito as respective characters. OceanVeil is streaming the series. Medialink licensed the anime in Southeast Asia.
