= Ichigo Aika =

Japanese adult manga series

- Ichigo Aika: Strawberry Elegy
- Cover of the first volume

イチゴ哀歌～雑で生イキな妹と割り切れない兄～ (Ichigo Aika: Zatsu de Namaiki na Imōto to Warikirenai Ani)
- Genre: Romantic comedy
- Manga
- Written by: Hirafumi
- Illustrated by: Yagi Shinba
- Published by: CLLENN; Suiseisha
- Magazine: DEDEDE
- Original run: November 27, 2022 – present
- Volumes: 12
- Anime television series
- Directed by: Pyuta Konno
- Written by: Eeyo Kurosaki
- Music by: Aiue Oka
- Studio: Studio Hōkiboshi
- Licensed by: OceanVeil
- Original network: BS11, Tokyo MX
- Original run: January 5, 2026 – March 23, 2026
- Episodes: 12

Ichigo Aika: Strawberry Elegy (イチゴ哀歌～雑で生イキな妹と割り切れない兄～, Ichigo Aika: Zatsu de Namaiki na Imōto to Warikirenai Ani) is a Japanese adult manga series written by Hirafumi and illustrated by Yabi Shinba. It began serialization online on the Comic CMoa service under CLLENN's DEDEDE label in November 2022. An anime television series adaptation produced by Studio Hōkiboshi aired from January to March 2026.

== Plot ==
The series follows Kōta, who gets a new younger sister named Aika after his father remarries. Aika is a gyaru with a dual personality: she acts kindly to her parents, but shows a brattier side to others, including Kōta. Aika quickly develops a fondness for her new stepbrother, and the two form a sexual relationship.

== Characters ==
Aika Takamura (高村藍花, Takamura Aika)
Voiced by: Hana Yurimoto
Kōta Takamura (高村光太, Takamura Kōta)
Voiced by: Yūta Ikarashi
Yoshiyuki Takamura (高村義行, Takamura Yoshiyuki)
Voiced by: Momosuke
Misaki Takamura (高村美咲, Takamura Misaki)
Voiced by: Iroha Haruno

== Media ==
=== Anime ===
An anime television series adaptation was announced on September 5, 2025. It is produced by Studio Hōkiboshi and directed by Pyuta Konno, with Eeyo Kurosaki handling series composition, Yoshihiro Watanabe designing the characters, and Aiue Oka composing the music. The series aired from January 5 to March 23, 2026, on BS11 and Tokyo MX as part of AnimeFesta. (Note: BS11 listed the series premiere on January 4 at 25:05, which is effectively January 5 at 1:05 a.m. JST.) The ending theme song is "Koi wa Prism" (恋はプリズム; 'Love is a Prism'), performed by Yuka Akashi and Yui Otokura. OceanVeil is streaming the series.
