= Marika's Love Meter Malfunction =

Japanese manga series

- Cover of the first printed volume

茉莉花ちゃんの好感度はぶっ壊れている (Marika-chan no Kōkando wa Bukkowarete Iru)
- Genre: Romantic comedy
- Manga
- Written by: Rin Komugi
- Published by: Suiseisha
- English publisher: NA: MangaPlaza
- Imprint: Suiseisha Comics (print)
- Magazine: Trahison
- Original run: April 29, 2024 – present
- Volumes: 23 (digital); 4 (print)
- Anime television series
- Directed by: Sumito Sasaki
- Written by: Masamitsu Ōtake; Scenario Engineering Institute
- Studio: Studio Leo
- Licensed by: OceanVeil; SEA: Plus Media Networks Asia
- Original network: Tokyo MX, BS11
- Original run: April 6, 2026 – June 8, 2026
- Episodes: 8

Marika's Love Meter Malfunction (Japanese: 茉莉花ちゃんの好感度はぶっ壊れている, Hepburn: Marika-chan no Kōkando wa Bukkowarete Iru) is a Japanese manga series written and illustrated by Rin Komugi. It began serialization online in April 2024. An anime television series adaptation produced by Studio Leo aired from April to June 2026.

== Plot ==
Kanata Kitami has feelings for his childhood friend Marika Chitose, but given their contrasts, with Marika being cute and popular, and Kanata being a loner with few friends, he struggles to confess to her. One day, he encounters a shooting star and wishes to be able to understand other people better and to make life more like love simulation games. The next day, he wakes up with the ability to see love meters next to girls he encounters. He discovers that Marika's own meter is in the negatives, a fact that confuses him when the two meet up later that day and she treats him nicely.

== Characters ==
Kanata Kitami (北見 彼方, Kitami Kanata)
Voiced by: Kōhei Amasaki (Japanese); Ciaran Strange (English)
The protagonist, he has long had feelings for Marika. However, he is too timid to confess. After making a wish to a shooting star on the way home from school, he gains the ability to see love meters next to women, including his mother and the family dog. However, he discovers that Marika's own love meter is broken, which leaves him confused as to why Marika treats him so nicely.
Marika Chitose (千歳 茉莉花, Chitose Marika)
Voiced by: Maaya Uchida (Japanese); Kelsey Jaffer (English)
Kanata's childhood friend and a popular student in school. Because she is popular and he is not, he has difficulty confessing to her. She secretly has feelings for Kanata as well, being obsessed to the point of having his picture on her phone and pictures of him plastered throughout her room. This leads to her love meter being unable to handle her love for him causing Kanata to misunderstand how she really feels about him.
Sayuki Toyotomi (豊富紗雪, Toyotomi Sayuki)
Voiced by: Ayasa Itō (Japanese); Darcey Lee (English)
Kanata's classmate who has a delinquent personality. She treats Kanata harshly in school, but later warms up to him after he helps out her younger sister Mashiro and invites him to stay over for dinner (after Mashiro insists that he stays) which causes her love meter to go up when it was practically nonexistent earlier in the day after he accidentally stumbled on her desk in school.
Kokona Mikasa (三笠心菜, Mikasa Kokona)
Voiced by: Yurie Igoma (Japanese); Katy Johnson (English)
One of Kanata's classmates who is a lot more friendly with him. After Kanata gets the ability to see love meters next to girls, hers shoots up after he notices a flower petal in her hair which he removes, making him realize that the meters tend to go up when he does nice things for girls.
Niino Hidaka (日高新乃, Hidaka Niino)
Voiced by: Rie Kugimiya (Japanese); Caroline Orejeula (English)
Kanata's other childhood friend who moved here from Italy. Niino revealed to be a boy.

== Development ==
Rin Komugi wanted to write a series featuring characters who are clumsy at expressing their love. They found it challenging to characterize Marika as a character who is seen as a perfect girl by others but actually has flaws, specifically her extreme love for Kanata.

== Media ==
=== Manga ===
Komugi launched the series on April 29, 2024, with it being published by Suiseisha on multiple websites under its Trahison label. 23 single chapter volumes have been released digitally as of May 2026, and a printed version began publication by Suiseisha under its Suiseisha Comics imprint on April 17, 2026. Four volumes have been released as of September 18, 2026. The series is released in English on the MangaPlaza website.

==== Volumes ====
No.	Japanese release date	Japanese ISBN
1	April 17, 2026	978-4-434-37093-9
2	April 17, 2026	978-4-434-37094-6
3	June 18, 2026	978-4-434-37577-4
4	September 18, 2026	978-4-434-38028-0

=== Anime ===
An anime television series adaptation was announced on November 20, 2025. The series is produced by Studio Leo and directed by Sumito Sasaki, with Masamitsu Ōtake and Scenario Engineering Institute handling series composition and Rena Nasu designing the characters. It aired from on April 6 to June 8, 2026, on Tokyo MX and BS11, with AnimeFesta stream the series uncensored. The opening theme song is "Hakaritai Kōkando" (はかりたい好感度), performed by Maaya Uchida as her character Marika Chitose. OceanVeil is streaming the series. Plus Media Networks Asia has licensed the series in Southeast Asia and will broadcast it on Aniplus Asia.
