= The Shy Snow Woman and the Cursed Ring =

Japanese adult doujinshi series

- Cover of the first English volume

人付き合いが苦手な未亡人の雪女さんと呪いの指輪 (Hitozukiai ga Nigate na Mibōjin no Yukionna-san to Noroi no Yubiwa)
- Genre: Supernatural
- Manga
- Written by: Puuna Puuzaki
- Published by: Self-published
- English publisher: Irodori Comics
- Original run: July 3, 2021 – present
- Volumes: 2
- Anime television series

The Lonely Snow Widow and the Cursed Ring
- Directed by: Kazuomi Koga
- Written by: Eeyo Kurosaki
- Studio: Studio Hōkiboshi
- Licensed by: OceanVeil
- Original network: BS11, Tokyo MX (censored)
- Original run: October 5, 2026 – present
- Episodes: 4/8

The Shy Snow Woman and the Cursed Ring (Japanese: 人付き合いが苦手な未亡人の雪女さんと呪いの指輪, Hepburn: Hitozukiai ga Nigate na Mibōjin no Yukionna-san to Noroi no Yubiwa) is a Japanese adult hentai doujinshi series written and illustrated by Puuna Puuzaki. It originally began self-publishing on July 3, 2021 and was later published on the DLsite platform on October 9, 2021. The doujinshi series is licensed in English by Irodori Comics. An anime television series adaptation produced by Studio Hōkiboshi premiered in October 2026.

== Plot ==
Satoru Takahashi, a remote worker who also serves as the manager of an apartment complex, lives in a world where supernatural creatures live together with humans. Having taken over being the apartment's manager from his late father, he meets Mifuyu Yukino, a yuki-onna and widow who has just moved into the complex. Still mourning the death of her husband two years prior, she feels sexually frustrated, knowing that rumors exist that those who marry yuki-onna are fated to an early death, and knowing she is unable to get pregnant. When Satoru discovers a ring in Mifuyu's apartment, he decides to use it to start a sexual relationship with her.

== Characters ==
Satoru Takahashi (高橋さとる, Takahashi Satoru)
Voiced by: Harumichi Shidō
Mifuyu Yukino (雪乃深冬, Yukino Mifuyu)
Voiced by: Rikka Kitami
Kaede Kiryuin (鬼龍院楓, Kiryuin Kaede)
Voiced by: Sara Ayumi

== Media ==
=== Anime ===
An anime television series adaptation, telling a different original story form the original doujinshi, was announced on May 29, 2026. The series will be produced by Suiseisha as part of AnimeFesta, animated by Studio Hōkiboshi and directed by Kazuomi Koga, with Eeyo Kurosaki handling series composition, and Minakyawa Akapiv designing the characters. It premiered on October 5, 2026, on BS11 and Tokyo MX. The theme song is "Choux Cream" (シュークリーム; 'Cream Puff'), performed by Hitomi Suzune. OceanVeil is streaming the series under the title The Lonely Snow Widow and the Cursed Ring.
