= I'll Live a Long Life to Dote on My Favorite Stepbrother! =

Japanese light novel series

- First light novel volume cover

最推しの義兄を愛でるため、長生きします！ (Saioshi no Gikei o Mederu Tame, Nagaikishimasu!)
- Genre: Isekai; Boys' love
- Novel series
- Written by: Tenma Asahi
- Published by: AlphaPolis
- Original run: September 25, 2021 – present
- Light novel
- Written by: Tenma Asahi
- Illustrated by: Kazuaki
- Published by: AlphaPolis
- Imprint: &arche Novels b (vol. 1–3); &arche Novels (vol. 4–)
- Original run: November 20, 2022 – present
- Volumes: 6
- Manga
- Written by: Tenma Asahi
- Illustrated by: Aki Tsujimoto
- Published by: AlphaPolis
- Imprint: &arche Comics
- Magazine: &arche
- Original run: January 25, 2024 – present
- Volumes: 3
- Anime television series
- Directed by: Yūsuke Morishita
- Written by: Izumi Tezuka
- Music by: YAMAAD; Almond
- Studio: Imagica Infos; Imageworks Studio
- Licensed by: OceanVeil
- Original network: tvk
- Original run: January 6, 2026 – March 24, 2026
- Episodes: 12

I'll Live a Long Life to Dote on My Favorite Stepbrother! (最推しの義兄を愛でるため、長生きします！, Saioshi no Gikei o Mederu Tame, Nagaikishimasu!; lit. 'In Order to Love My Most Beloved Brother-In-Law, I'll Live a Long Life!') is a Japanese light novel series written by Tenma Asahi and illustrated by Kazuaki. Originally published online since September 2021, AlphaPolis have published six volumes of the series since November 2022 under their &arche Novels b and &arche Novels imprints. A manga adaptation illustrated by Aki Tsujimoto began serialization online via AlphaPolis' &arche manga website in January 2024 and has been collected in three tankōbon volumes. A "light anime" television series adaptation produced by Imagica Infos and Imageworks Studio aired from January to March 2026.

== Plot ==
A young man who is reincarnated into the world of his favorite otome game as Alba, the sickly son of an impoverished noble family. Born with an illness that prevents him from using magic and leaves him with a short life expectancy, Alba is taken in by a powerful duke's family. There, he meets Orsis, the duke's son and his new stepbrother, who was Alba's favorite character in his previous life.

As Alba adjusts to his new circumstances, he recalls that in the original game's story, his own death plays a crucial role in Orsis's character development, robbing him of his smile. Determined to avoid this fate, Alba begins searching for ways to extend his life and evade the events that lead to his tragic end. While doting openly on Orsis, Alba works to change the future of the story, hoping to remain by his side and alter the destiny that binds them both.

== Characters ==
Alba (アルバ, Aruba)
Voiced by: Ayumu Murase
Orsis (オルシス, Orushisu)
Voiced by: Shouta Aoi
Hals (ハルス, Harusu)
Voiced by: Reo Tatsumori
Floro (フローロ, Furōro)
Voiced by: Maaya Torigoe
Bruno (ブルーノ, Burūno)
Voiced by: Yūya Hirose

== Media ==
=== Light novel ===
Written by Tenma Asahi, I'll Live a Long Life to Dote on My Favorite Stepbrother! began serialization as a web novel published on AlphaPolis' website on September 25, 2021. It later began publication with illustrations by Kazuaki under AlphaPolis' &arche Novels b (volumes 1–3) and &arche Novels (volume 4 onwards) light novel imprints on November 20, 2022. Six volumes have been released as of December 20, 2025.

No.	Release date	ISBN
1	November 20, 2022	978-4-434-31144-4
2	May 20, 2023	978-4-434-32024-8
3	November 15, 2023	978-4-434-32914-2
4	May 20, 2024	978-4-434-33893-9
5	January 20, 2025	978-4-434-35137-2
6	December 20, 2025	978-4-434-36865-3; 978-4-434-36864-6 (SE)

=== Manga ===
A manga adaptation illustrated by Aki Tsujimoto began serialization on AlphaPolis' &arche manga website on January 25, 2024. The manga's chapters have been collected into three tankōbon volumes as of February 2026.

No.	Release date	ISBN
1	August 20, 2024	978-4-434-34324-7
2	July 20, 2025	978-4-434-35912-5
3	February 20, 2026	978-4-434-36469-3

=== Anime ===
A "light anime" television series adaptation was announced on June 30, 2025. The series is produced by AnimationID under the boys' love label Balloon, animated by Imagica Infos and Imageworks Studio and directed by Yūsuke Morishita, with Izumi Tezuka handling series composition and YAMAAD and Almond composing the music. It aired from January 6 to March 24, 2026, on tvk. The ending theme song is "Endless You" performed by Shouta Aoi. OceanVeil is streaming the series.
