= Ingoku Danchi =

Japanese manga series

- Ingoku Danchi: Deviant's Apartment Complex
- First tankōbon volume cover

淫獄団地
- Manga
- Written by: Kenkyūjo Sakuseki
- Illustrated by: Yui Jōyama
- Published by: Fujimi Shobo
- Imprint: Dragon Comics Age
- Magazine: Dra Dra Sharp
- Original run: January 8, 2021 – July 31, 2026
- Volumes: 10
- Anime television series
- Directed by: Toshikatsu Tokoro
- Written by: Eeyo Kurosaki
- Music by: Ruzarin Kashiwagi
- Studio: Elias
- Licensed by: OceanVeil
- Original network: BS11, Tokyo MX (censored)
- Original run: April 6, 2026 – June 22, 2026
- Episodes: 12
- icon

Ingoku Danchi: Deviant's Apartment Complex (淫獄団地; lit. 'Hellish Apartment Complex'), also known as Perverts' Apartment Complex, is a Japanese manga series written by Kenkyūjo Sakuseki and illustrated by Yui Jōyama. It was serialized on Niconico under Fujimi Shobo's Dra Dra Sharp from January 2021 to July 2026, and was compiled into ten volumes. A short-form anime television series adaptation produced by Elias aired from April to June 2026.

== Plot ==
Yoshida, a high school graduate who is currently living as a NEET, has taken over running an apartment complex from his father. One day, he receives a complaint from one of the residents regarding Watanabe, one of the complex's residents. Yoshida initially does not believe the rumor, seeing Watanabe as a kind woman who loves children. However, that night, while patrolling, he encounters Watanabe dressed in suggestive clothing. After Watanabe attacks him, they discover that Watanabe had discovered clothes left behind called Libido Cloth, which caused her to lose control of her mind. Yoshida decides to investigate the Libido Cloth, wanting to find out who is behind it, all while dealing with the complex's married women.

== Characters ==
Mamoru Yoshida (ヨシダ マモル, Yoshida Mamoru)
Voiced by: Aika Wakuno (Japanese); Shay-Ki Fullalove (English)
A high school graduate who had been unable to find employment. He took over running the apartment complex due to his father's health issues. Due to his young appearance, he has become the subject of interest among the married women affected by the Libido Cloth.
Watanabe (ワタナベ)
Voiced by: Kana Yūki (PV, anime) (Japanese); Chloe Eves (English)
A woman who lives at the complex, who serves as a traffic guard. She claims that it is because her son was involved in a traffic accident. It is revealed that she lost custody of her son following her husband divorcing her. This caused her to be sexually frustrated. She is the first woman Yoshida discovers to have been affected by the Libido Cloth.
Ichinose (イチノセ)
Voiced by: Kana Yūki (PV, anime) (Japanese); Chloe Eves (English)
A woman who lives at the complex. She spread suggestive photos of herself, wanting people to become attracted to her.
Mizutani (ミズタニ)
Voiced by: Kana Yūki (PV, anime) (Japanese); Mana T. Johnson (English)
A woman who lives at the complex. She is fond of lotion play.
Sanamori (サナモリ)
Voiced by: Kana Yūki (PV, anime) (Japanese); Chloe Eves (English)
A woman who lives at the complex. She is very shy, to the point she hides herself wearing a pill bug costume.
Kanzaki (カンザキ)
Voiced by: Kana Yūki (PV, anime) (Japanese); Chloe Eves (English)
A saleswoman who works for a company that produces overly expensive gadgets and equipment.
Katagiri (カタギリ)
Voiced by: Kana Yūki (PV, anime) (Japanese); Chloe Eves (English)
One of the apartment complex's residents, who first informed Yoshida about Watanabe's past. She helps Yoshida with his investigation about the Libido Cloth.
Gouda (ゴウダ)
Voiced by: Kana Yūki (anime) (Japanese); Mana T. Johnson (English)
Shikijō (シキジョウ)
Voiced by: Kana Yūki (anime) (Japanese); Mana T. Johnson (English)
Sakakura (サカクラ)
Voiced by: Kana Yūki (anime) (Japanese); Mana T. Johnson (English)
Ikayama (イカヤマ)
Voiced by: Kana Yūki (anime) (Japanese); Mana T. Johnson (English)
Kiritani (キリタニ)
Voiced by: Ai Shimizu (Japanese); Chloe Eves (English)
Numajiri (ヌマジリ)
Voiced by: Shinobu Izumi (Japanese); Aria Pierce (English)
Shōda (ハセガワ)
Voiced by: Misato Fukuen (Japanese); Jessica Warner (English)
Shirakage (ツジサキ)
Voiced by: Misato Fukuen (Japanese); Angela Tran (English)
Hasegawa (シラカゲ)
Voiced by: Sayuri Yahagi (Japanese); Abby Pasion (English)
Tsujisaki (ショウダ)
Voiced by: Sayuri Yahagi (Japanese); KyLeigh Zimmerer (English)
Andō (アンドウ)
Voiced by: Kazuki Asami (Japanese); Aife (English)
Haibara (ハイバラ)
Voiced by: Nagisa Kujime (Japanese); Zoe Lee (English)
Yoshida's Father
Voiced by: Tomokazu Sugita (PV) (Japanese); Steve Warky Nunez (English)
Yoshida's father, who is currently hospitalized due to health issues. He warned Yoshida to be careful about the apartment complex's married women.

== Media ==
=== Manga ===
The series is written by Kenkyūjo Sakuseki and illustrated by Yui Jōyama, who serialized it on Dwango's Niconico website under Fujimi Shobo's Dra Dra Sharp from January 8, 2021, to July 31, 2026. The series was also posted on Kadokawa Corporation's KadoComi service. The first tankōbon volume was released on June 8, 2021; a promotional video featuring the voices of Kana Yūki and Tomokazu Sugita was released to promote the volume's release. Ten volumes were released up to November 9, 2026.

| No. | Release date | ISBN |
|---|---|---|
| 1 | June 8, 2021 | 978-4-04-074114-7 |
| 2 | November 9, 2021 | 978-4-04-074308-0 |
| 3 | June 9, 2022 | 978-4-04-074561-9 |
| 4 | January 7, 2023 | 978-4-04-074836-8 |
| 5 | August 9, 2023 | 978-4-04-075075-0 |
| 6 | March 8, 2024 | 978-4-04-075368-3 |
| 7 | October 9, 2024 | 978-4-04-075641-7 |
| 8 | June 9, 2025 | 978-4-04-075966-1 |
| 9 | February 9, 2026 | 978-4-04-076274-6 |
| 10 | November 9, 2026 | 978-4-04-076678-2 |

=== Anime ===
A short-form anime television series adaptation produced under WWWave Corporation's Deregula anime label was announced on January 15, 2026. The series is animated by Elias and directed by Toshikatsu Tokoro, with Eeyo Kurosaki handling series composition, Shingo Nishimoto designing the characters, and Ruzarin Kashiwagi composing the music. Tomokazu Sugita narrated the anime. It aired from April 6 to June 22, 2026, on BS11 and Tokyo MX, with the AnimeFesta service exclusively streaming the anime's completely uncensored version. OceanVeil is streaming the series. An English dub will be premiere on November 11, 2026.

=== Other ===
An ASMR product based on the series was released on the Mimicle service on July 29, 2022.

== Reception ==
As of December 2025, the series' official page on Niconico reported that it had over 300,000 copies in circulation.
