= Black Clover season 2 =

Black Clover
- Season 2
- Key visual for the second season
- No. of episodes: 8

Release
- Original network: TV Tokyo
- Original release: October 3, 2026 – present

Season chronology
- ← Previous; Season 1

The second season of the Japanese anime television series Black Clover is directed by Ayataka Tanemura and produced by Studio Pierrot. It is based on the manga series Black Clover by Yūki Tabata. The series is set in a world where magic is a common everyday part of people's lives, and is centered around one of the only known person to not be able to use magic, Asta. Asta as well as his friend, rival, and adoptive brother Yuno, aspire to become the wizard king however to most people it would seem that Asta had no chance of becoming wizard king while Yuno was famous in his village as a prodigy.

A second season was officially announced by Crunchyroll at Anime Expo in July 2025, along with the release of a teaser video. A trailer was unveiled at Jump Festa '26 in December 2025. A second trailer which incorporates the season's opening theme was unveiled at Anime Expo in July 2026. The season premiered on TV Tokyo and its TXN affiliates on October 3, 2026.

The opening theme song for the season is "Kienai Riyū" (消えない理由; lit. 'The Reason It Won't Fade Away'), performed by Wanima, while the ending theme song is "Yellow Brick Road", performed by One or Eight.

== Episodes ==
No. overall	No. in season	Title	Directed by (Note: Production staff information is taken from the ending credits of each episode.)	Written by (Note: Labelled as "Scenario" (シナリオ))	Chief animation directed by	Original release date
171	1	"The Battle Begins"; Transliteration: "Kaisen" (Japanese: 開戦)	Directed by : Toshihiro Maeya; Storyboarded by : Ayataka Tanemura	Keiichirō Ōchi	Itsuko Takeda & Kosei Takahashi	October 3, 2026
With the Qliphoth Gate opening in three days, Asta and Liebe train under Nacht in his Devil Union Mode, trying to pull off Devil Union for themselves. Asta summons Yami's katana, which combined with Liebe's power goes from rusty to pure black, which Asta names Demon-Slasher. Two days later they achieve Union for a single moment when Nacht threatens to legitimately kill them for being useless. Yuno trains with Langris but mentions Bell is no longer willing to leave his grimoire. Before joining the other Magic Knights, Nacht leaves his devil Gimodelo to continue training Asta and Liebe, as they are not yet ready to use Union in a real fight. The Magic Knights launch their raid of the Spade Kingdom, during a diversion caused by the Resistance. A giant devil emerges from the Qliphoth Gate and attacks the Resistance, but it is stopped by Mereoleona. The other Magic Knights plan to take down the Dark Triad to stop the Qliphoth Advent Ritual. Yuno and Langris take on Zenon; Nacht and Jack the Ripper take on Dante; Rill and Charlotte take on Vanica; while Nozel, Fuegoleon and Dorothy handle the Dark Disciples.
172	2	"The Door to Hell"; Transliteration: "Jigoku e no Tobira" (Japanese: 地獄への扉)	Directed by : Tomoki Nakano; Storyboarded by : Shigehisa Iida	Keiichirō Ōchi	Itsuko Takeda	October 10, 2026
Mereoleona anticipates a more intense battle when the giant devil survives her attack. Elsewhere, Yuno and Langris battle Zenon, who boasts he can defeat them without taking a step. Yuno summons Bell and enters Spirit Dive. Even within Zenon's Mana Zone, Yuno retains control of his mana, leading Zenon to realize mana itself loves Yuno. Breaking through, Yuno pushes Zenon back a single step. Bored, Vanica sends disciples against Rill and Charlotte. Having mastered the Heart Kingdom's Rune Arrays, Charlotte reveals she modified her own curse, now an anti-curse spell, and traps Vanica in briars that grow stronger the more powerful her devil curse becomes. To withstand Dante's gravity magic, Nacht enters Union with Slotos for maximum defensive strength, needing to give Jack a chance to use his magic to cut that which cannot be cut. Remembering his hunting past and his quest for strong opponents after his father's death, Jack summons blades capable of cutting gravity, slashing a wound across Dante's chest he cannot regenerate. Commander Albert rallies the resistance, announcing Yuno is the image of his parents King Loyce and Queen Ciel. Nacht realises Morris has used a devil's power to extract Loropechika's wisdom, accelerating Qliphoth's growth. The gate opens, letting two high-ranking devils through. Asta and Liebe continue training with Gimodelo.
173	3	"Black Guardian"; Transliteration: "Kuroki Shugosha" (Japanese: 黒き守護者)	Ayumu Ono	Keiichirō Ōchi	Itsuko Takeda & Kumiko Tokunaga	October 17, 2026
Nacht struggles to evade the twin devils Lilith and Naamah. As Qliphoth continues to grow, lesser devils begin escaping. All three Triad members reveal now the gate is open they have 100% of their devil powers. Nacht is desperate to kill Morris. Zenon reveals the giant demon is merely one of two that were kept sealed by the Grinberryalls, and the second one has been sent to destroy the Clover Kingdom. The Purple Orcas, Silva siblings and other knights cannot stop the giant devil. In desperation, Julius ages himself ten years to gain his adult magic, then partners with Damnatio's Scale Magic to try and age the devil to dust, but his magic runs out. Asta suddenly arrives in full Devil Union, which can now last 5 minutes. The giant devil's magic is nullified as Asta splits it in half, destroying it and leaving only a giant skeleton behind. Gimodelo panics as he can sense Nacht is in trouble, but Asta has no way to reach the Spade Kingdom. Fortunately, his friends volunteer to help. In the Spade Kingdom all the weak devils are suddenly obliterated by Noelle and everyone else who learned the Mana Method in the Heart Kingdom. Several mid-rank devils exit the gate to join the battle, but are killed instantly by Luck with True Lightning.
174	4	"Day of Atonement"; Transliteration: "Shokuzai no Hi" (Japanese: 贖罪の日)	Directed by : Ji-Eun Park & Toshihiro Maeya; Storyboarded by : Ayataka Tanemura & Tessai Izumi	Keiichirō Ōchi	Itsuko Takeda & Yi Zhang	October 24, 2026
Nacht manages to forcibly teleport Lilith and Naamah away to give Jack a chance against Dante. Nacht remembers his twin brother, Morgen, who joined the magic knights to help people, whereas Nacht was a delinquent. When Nacht turned 18, his parents introduced him to the family secret of contracting with devils, for which Morgen was unfit due to his Light magic. When he proved himself capable, their parents urged Nacht to contract with the supreme devil that surpassed all others, Lucifugus. However, Lucifugus killed their entire family. Morgen broke the relic used to summon Lucifugus, saving Nacht but dying himself. Filled with self-loathing, Nacht joined Yami's new Black Bull Squad, but swore to work only in the shadows where he felt he belonged. Nacht enters Union with both Plumede and Walgner to take the form Gallus x Felis, trapping Lilith and Naamah in darkness forever at the cost of his own life. However, Nacht's sacrifice fails as the devils escape and prepare to kill him. Asta suddenly appears and severs Naamah's hand. Recognising Lilith and Naamah from the underworld, Liebe looks forward to destroying them himself. Naamah is split in half but Lilith saves his life by absorbing him into herself to share a body. They prepare to cast a spell to destroy the Spade Kingdom, but Asta increases the size of his Demon Slayer and reflects the spell back at them.
175	5	"The Highest vs. the Lowest"; Transliteration: "Saijō bāsasu Saitei" (Japanese: 最上VS最低)	Directed by : Toshihiro Maeya & Ayataka Tanemura; Storyboarded by : Jay1Jay1Jay1 & Ayataka Tanemura	Keiichirō Ōchi	Kosei Takahashi	October 31, 2026
Naamah/Lilith experience fear for the first time and try to flee, but Nacht restrains them for a vital second, allowing Asta to kill them. As Devil Union expires, Asta and Liebe separate. Nacht notes their imperfect Union requires a 30-minute recovery. Dante nearly kills Jack before Magna and Zora intervene. Dante ignores Magna's incoming fireball, only to be caught off guard when a magic chain sprouts from the impact site, linking them. Magna explains his new spell, Soul Chain Deathmatch, was developed by himself and Zora to compensate for Magna's inability to learn Mana Method. The spell links their souls and shares their combined mana equally, meaning their fight will be decided by pure willpower instead of mana. Despite losing 50% of his mana, Dante boasts his self-healing body makes his victory inevitable, and he nearly kills Magna in a fistfight. However, Dante's mana suddenly disappears completely. Magna reveals that because Soul Chain Deathmatch continuously balances their mana reserves, Dante has just exhausted his power for the first time in his life, leaving him unable to use Gravity magic or Lucifero's devil magic. As the superior hand-to-hand combatant, Magna wins the now magicless fight by knocking Dante unconscious with one punch. Zora proudly congratulates Magna for defeating a devil-possessed Royal using only the willpower of a peasant.
176	6	"The Sacred Valkyrie"; Transliteration: "Seinaru Ikusaotome" (Japanese: 聖なる戦乙女)	Takahiro Ōtsuka	Keiichirō Ōchi	Kosei Takahashi & Takaya Sunagawa	November 7, 2026
Dante's defeat causes the Qliphoth summoning circle to weaken, so Nacht takes everyone to find Vanica and Zenon. Dante's magic revives him but mutates his body gruesomely. Jack returns to finish him off, not wanting Dante's revival to spoil Magna's victory. Vanica reveals she has Loropechika, now turned into a devil by her curse. Noelle arrives, revealing she is partnered with Undine. As the new host of the Water Spirit, Noelle is now capable of magic above Arcane; Saint Magic, which can purify devils. Gaja keeps Loropechika distracted. Noelle activates Saint Valkyrie Armour. Vanica feels a familiar fear and remembers that right after she became Megicula's host, she sought out Acier Silva to fight her. Threatening her children Nozelle and newborn Noelle, Vanica was stabbed by Acier, almost killing her. She fled, but cursed Acier, leading to her eventual death. Noelle overwhelms Vanica and decides to execute her. Megicula suddenly manifests from Vanica's body, revealing she has spent years preparing to manifest through powerful summoning rituals instead of through Qliphoth. First, she cursed Acier to death, allowing her to possess half of Vanica's body. All she now requires is for both Vanica and Loropechika to die as sacrifices and she will manifest permanently. Megicula defeats Charlotte and Rill. Gaja is stabbed by Loropechika and Noelle's Valkyrie Armour vanishes.
177	7	"Beyond Tenacity"; Transliteration: "Futei no Saki" (Japanese: 不諦の先)	Directed by : Hironori Tanaka; Storyboarded by : Hironori Tanaka & Chiaki Kon	Keiichirō Ōchi	Itsuko Takeda, Kumiko Tokunaga & Takaya Sunagawa	November 14, 2026
Fearing he has failed Loropechika, Gaja attacks Megicula with his strongest lightning spell, Apocalypra Astrauza. Megicula's ultra-high-speed recovery leaves her unharmed while Gaja dies. Confused by humanity's persistence, Megicula is told by Noelle that never giving up is their greatest strength. Megicula uses explosion magic on Loropechika, but Asta arrives and nullifies it. Megicula tries cursing Vanica and Loropechika to death so she can manifest, but Charlotte removes the curses with briars, revealing Rill’s Twilight Valhalla spell has recovered her and revived Gaja, making everyone temporarily immortal. Inspired by Asta and finally admitting to herself she loves him, Noelle charges Megicula using the last of her Saint Stage power. Gaja and Luck destroy Megicula's body so Noelle can strike her heart, though Megicula recovers and nearly kills Noelle. Nozel suddenly arrives and saves her. A flashback reveals Megicula cursed Nozel to die if he ever told anyone about Acier's curse, leaving their family to blame Noelle's birth for Acier's death. Fearing she was too weak, Nozel repeatedly discouraged Noelle from training or fighting, though doing so broke his heart every time. Having trained since childhood for revenge, Nozel shatters Megicula's defences, enabling Noelle to destroy her heart and kill her. Megicula’s death frees Acier's trapped soul, allowing her to tell her children she is proud of them before passing on.
178	8	"A Devil's Heart"; Transliteration: "Akuma no Shinzō" (Japanese: 悪魔の心臓)	TBA	TBA	TBA	November 21, 2026
Loropechika reverts to human, and an embarrassed Noelle, having admitted her love for Asta, punches him for carrying the naked Loropechika. Freed from his curse, Nozel wants to speak honestly with Noelle but does not know how to. Rill’s Twilight Valhalla fades, causing him, Charlotte, and Gaja to collapse. Loropechika’s water healing fails but Nacht arrives with Mimosa, who uses Mana Method: Flower Princess Utopia to restore them, prompting Gaja to confess his love to Loropechika, who faints. Yuno prepares a spell to defeat Zenon while Langris shields him by casting his own Mana Zone inside Zenon’s Mana Zone. Though Zenon breaks through and wounds Langris, Yuno summons the Spirit of Euros bow and pierces Zenon’s bone armor with a wind arrow. The strike triggers Zenon’s memories of his childhood friend Allen, who protected him from bullies and joined the Mage Defense Force alongside him. During a mission, Zenon was forced to kill a sealed devil by piercing a bone spear through Allen, killing him. Heartbroken and obsessed with gaining strength, Zenon agreed to make a pact with the devils with help from his mysterious fourth sibling. In the present, Zenon calls upon his devil, Beelzebub, for aid, agreeing to surrender his own soul to him in exchange for a devil’s heart. Now transformed into a true devil, Zenon mocks Yuno for choosing not to fire an arrow through Langris—as he himself had once done with Allen—thereby missing the enemy’s heart, and he sweeps Yuno aside. Zenon corners Langris, but Finral intervenes; the two combine their respective spatial magic to boost both speed and precision, enabling the arrow to inflict a devastating wound directly into Zenon’s chest.
