= That Time I Got Reincarnated as a Slime season 4 =

That Time I Got Reincarnated as a Slime
- Season 4
- Key visual for the 4th season
- No. of episodes: 24

Release
- Original network: NNS (Nippon TV), BS11
- Original release: April 3, 2026 – present

Season chronology
- ← Previous; Season 3

That Time I Got Reincarnated as a Slime is an anime television series based on the light novel series of the same title written by Fuse and illustrated by Mitz Vah. Eight Bit produces the anime. The series follows a man who is killed and reincarnated in another world as a slime named Rimuru.

Following the airing of the third season's final episode, a fourth season has been announced, along with a second film. The fourth season is set to premiere in 5 cours, with the first 2 cours premiering from April 3 to September 25, 2026. The third cour is set to premiere in July 2027. The other two cours have no release dates yet.

== Episodes ==
No. overall	No. in season	Title	Directed by	Written by	Storyboarded by	Original release date
73	1	"New Days"; Transliteration: "Atarashī Hibi" (Japanese: 新しい日々)	Unknown	Unknown	TBA	April 3, 2026
As Shuna searches for Rimuru, the latter observes Tempest and sees how monsters and humans have been getting along. He has also made plans to build a train station for the new Magitrain and a bar with female elves on the Dungeon’s 95th floor. However, Rimuru also learns that the Dungeon has been having issues with the level of difficulty for most adventurers. Meanwhile, Hinata teaches class in Tempest, with Class S being among them, but when she catches Rimuru in the classroom, she throws him out. After Shuna finds Rimuru, she gives him a new type of dish: pudding that resembles Rimuru himself, which he shares with Veldora, Ramiris, Gard, and Masayuki. While talking about how to improve the Dungeon, Masayuki gives Rimuru some helpful ideas such as save points, bathrooms, restaurants, and tutorials, while Gard creates advertisements to attract adventurers with the promise of reward money. After Shion makes tea for Rimuru, Diablo accepts no reward for his help in taking control of Falmuth, but he does wish to have his own subordinates. Rimuru also has Souei keep an eye on Muese to find out more about his background. In Engrassia, Yuuki is unable to progress with his plans now that Rimuru is onto him, so he decides to be neutral towards Rimuru despite concerns from the Alliance, but he also continues his plans in the West. Meanwhile, Maribel and Granville begin their plans to destroy Tempest in favor of a former Chosen Hero.
74	2	"The Dungeon Evolves"; Transliteration: "Shinka suru Meikyū" (Japanese: 進化する迷宮)	Unknown	Unknown	TBA	April 10, 2026
Team Lightspeed tries out the Dungeon again. After clearing the 30th floor, Masayuki's fame rises. Rimuru, Masayuki, Ramiris, Grad, and Veldora are pleased to see how the Dungeon is functioning. They also learn that another group called Team Green Fury is clearing the Dungeon quickly. Ramiris and Veldora are paid for their hard work. Also, merchants from the Western Nations are visiting Tempest. Private research labs for Rimuru and Ramiris are built in the Dungeon. Shion and Shuna visit Rimuru during this time to let him know that Gard needs to talk to him. Gard reveals that Team Green Fury have also cleared the 30th floor. It turns out that the party has been increasing their members and using save points before a boss fight to return with fresh fighters, which will be a problem for the Dungeon. Rimuru also learns that the bosses on the 60th and 70th floors have been experiencing issues and the Crusaders who are training in the Dungeon are having their own issues, leading Hinata to take on the Dungeon herself. She managed to clear the entire Dungeon but couldn't beat Veldora; thus, Rimuru isn't willing to reward her. He, Shion, and Shuna visit Adalmann, who lost to the Crusaders since he can't use Holy Magic anymore. After helping him develop new magic attacks, they provide him with his throne room. They still have to resolve the issue with Ramiris's Elemental Colossus, which can't respawn. Milim returns with Ranga and Gobta, having finished their training. She is shocked to learn that the dragons that she caught for the Dungeon have been beaten. Ranga and Gobta are rewarded for their hard work. Upon learning of Team Green Fury's progress, Rimuru makes new devices that create avatar monsters based on their thoughts and transfer their consciousnesses into those monsters, which they intend to use to stop Team Green Fury. However, they need to learn how to use their new forms first.
75	3	"The Avatar Team is Formed"; Transliteration: "Karimatai Chīmu Kessei" (Japanese: 仮魔体チーム結成)	Unknown	Unknown	TBA	April 17, 2026
In the Kingdom of Seltrozzo, Maribel recalls her past as a noble from Earth, having died from old age after a life of financial and political influence and manipulation. After being reborn in the Central World, she was given a special unique skill called "Greed," which allows her to manipulate greed in others, though she doesn't use this power on Granville due to his sheer power. The two plan to bring peace to the world by conquering it. Back in Tempest, following issues with handling their avatars, Rimuru and his friends go to see Kurobe for new gear. They start training on how to properly handle their avatars in the Dungeon. Gard soon informs Rimuru about Team Green Fury's progress, and Raphael advises Rimuru to interfere with Ramiris's Mazecraft ability so he can learn about the team's stats. Once ready, the team proceeds to stop Team Green Fury. The plan is successful, and Team Green Fury leaves following their loss. Meanwhile, Yuuki arranges a meeting with Maribel. Since defeating Rimuru proves nearly impossible now due to Veldora's presence, Maribel comes with the idea to use Greed on Rimuru in hopes of controlling him. She also intends to use Yuuki for her own means and begins her plan to lure Rimuru to Seltrozzo so she can set a trap for him. Meanwhile, Muese is murdered for his failures, leaving Souei shocked.
76	4	"Invitation"; Transliteration: "Shōtaijō" (Japanese: 招待状)	Unknown	Unknown	TBA	April 24, 2026
Rimuru and his friends continue to take on adventurers in the Dungeon using their avatars, which is attracting more challengers. Rimuru then gets a visitor: Frey, which makes Milim nervous since Frey is aware that she is still neglecting her duties. After Frey leaves with Milim, Shuna arrives and is also aware of what Rimuru was doing this whole time. Gard arrives with a letter from the Council of the West, leading Rimuru to suspect that Team Green Fury were scouts sent by the Council. Meanwhile, Maribel resumes her plans to destroy Tempest using the Council as pawns. The Council holds a meeting to decide whether they should ally with Tempest or not; Hinata is also attending the meeting. Eventually, the Council decides to let Tempest join them after all, but they also have concerns about the Eastern Empire and Veldora. Hinata leaves the meeting afterward, but Elric, the first prince of Engrassia, and his knight Reiner, want to speak with her. Eric asks Hinata to serve as his bodyguard during the upcoming meeting with Rimuru to see if he is trustworthy or not, as he is still skeptical of the monster leader. Hinata refuses due to her allegiance with Tempest, warning him against antagonizing Rimuru. Elric does not take this rejection kindly. However, Hinata also suspects that the meeting was set up. Rimuru prepares to attend the meeting with the Council with Shuna, Benimaru, and Souei, though Shion is unhappy that she has to stay behind, until Rimuru explains that he's leaving her in charge of Tempest.
77	5	"The First Step"; Transliteration: "Saisho no Ippo" (Japanese: 最初の一歩)	Unknown	Unknown	TBA	May 8, 2026
Rimuru and his subordinates arrive in Engrassia to join the Council of the West. They first take a tour of the place and start by buying new clothes, though Rimuru ends up getting kids' clothes by mistake. At a restaurant, they meet Hinata again. After casting a soundproof barrier, Hinata tells Rimuru more about the meeting and warns him that some nobles are either opposing Rimuru or planning to use him for their own means. This leads them to suspect that the Eastern Empire is taking action against the recent events in the West. Rimuru asks Hinata to investigate Dwargon for a possible invasion route. Recalling Muese's death, they suspect that he has connections to the Western Nations. Meanwhile, Maribel plans to sabotage Rimuru during the meeting to prevent his alliance with the Council and hopefully destroy him with the help of Johann, one of the Five Elders, the hidden rulers of the Western Nations under Granville. Yuuki visits Maribel and questions her motives. The next day, Rimuru visits the Council's headquarters, where the Council members talk to him about the festival and the Magitrain that he was developing. As the meeting begins, the Council's chairman Lester names three rules that must be followed when joining the Council. Rimuru agrees with the conditions, but upon reading the results, Rimuru reacts with hostility.
78	6	"The Council of the West"; Transliteration: "Seihō Shokoku Hyōgikai" (Japanese: 西方諸国評議会)	Unknown	Unknown	TBA	May 15, 2026
It turns out the Council is attempting to take advantage of Tempest's resources (the Magitrain, weapons and money, and the Dungeon), which Rimuru takes as an act of slavery for his citizens. Raphael senses that someone is manipulating the Council, so Rimuru removes the mental influence, but he wonders who was responsible for it; he does not suspect Yuuki. Elric arrives with Reiner, Team Green Fury, and their leader Girard, and Gaiye, having been summoned here by Gaban, another one of the Five Elders, to deal with Rimuru against Lester's wishes. The rest of the Council weren't expecting this. Hinata, who was also in the meeting, is also displeased with this idea, but Elric reveals that he planned to take down and control Rimuru, demanding the Council to help him. Elric uses an Orb of Domination, the same thing that was used to control Milim (even though she wasn't really brainwashed); it cannot control Rimuru, but Elric doesn't know that. He attempts to force Rimuru to wear it, but the Council turns against him, leading to Gaban's plan being exposed by Rimuru. Elric's group refuse to give up, so Hinata takes on Reiner while Gaiye attempts to fight Rimuru, but Shuna decides to take him on instead. Hinata easily defeats Reiner, and Shuna swiftly destroys Gaiye's holy sword before taking him down using her magic. Raphael senses Glenda attempting to kill Elric from a distance for his failures, which Rimuru stops at the last second. They suspect that someone is trying to frame Rimuru for murder as Reiner and Gaiye are arrested. Elric ends his conflict with Rimuru after seeing that he isn't evil but also sees that Gaban is responsible for the whole thing. He doesn't have proof, but Aegil, the king of Engrassia and Elric's father, arrives and clears things up, forming an alliance with Rimuru while disciplining his son for his actions and having Gaban arrested. This worries Johann, who was also in the meeting. The Council decides to accept their allegiance with Rimuru after all, but with more peaceful matters. Meanwhile, Souei confronts Glenda following her failed assassination attempt.
79	7	"The Mastermind's Identity"; Transliteration: "Kuromaku no Shōtai" (Japanese: 黒幕の正体)	Unknown	Unknown	TBA	May 22, 2026
Souei fights Glenda, who manages to kill him, only for him to reveal that she had killed a doppelganger. Glenda finds herself surrounded by more doppelgangers and the real Souei, resulting in her capture. Rimuru has another meal with Benimaru, Hinata, and Shuna following the meeting before Souei arrives and tells them about Glenda, who Rimuru deduces is an Otherworlder. They interrogate Glenda regarding her actions. Rimuru does not want to kill Glenda, but Hinata and Shuna remind him that they can just revive her. Rimuru takes over the interrogation and, with Raphael's help, sees that she was also under the same influence as the Council and that Maribel is the mastermind behind the whole thing. Hinata deducts that Maribel and her grandfather were the ones who manipulated the Seven Luminaries to attack Tempest in the first place. Glenda reveals that she is under a curse that forces her to serve the Rozzos, and she will be killed if she disobeys. Rimuru removes the curse, setting Glenda free. She decides to ally with Rimuru in return and reveals that Granville, thought to have died, is still alive, and gives further information about Granville's scheme and Maribel's influence on Yuuki. Meanwhile, Maribel learns of her plan's failure. Though Johann considers allying with Rimuru, Maribel refuses, as she still wants to kill the monster king.
80	8	"The Groundwork of Greed"; Transliteration: "Gōyoku no Fuseki" (Japanese: 強欲の布石)	Unknown	Unknown	TBA	May 29, 2026
Yuuki agrees with Maribel's plan, and Johann learns of Glenda's capture, whom they believe to have been killed by Rimuru. Yuuki also reveals that he intends to investigate some ruins called Amrita located in Distave, Clayman's old domain, which houses a powerful reactor. Maribel plans to defeat Rimuru there, even though Milim will be with him too. Yuuki has something that once belonged to Milim, which they plan to return to Milim to separate her from Rimuru and defeat them at the same time. Yuuki also forewarns them about Veldora, but Maribel is not bothered by that. Meanwhile, Rimuru builds a new reception hall in Tempest, and Glenda now serves Souei. He and his friends then visit a restaurant in Tempest. Glenda tells them more about the Five Elders, Maribel, Gaban, Johann, and their schemes. She also warns them about the Blood Shadow, a group that works for the Rozzo family. Rimuru sends Souei to investigate the Five Elders and the Rozzo family while he plans to investigate Amrita, with Gobta deciding to tag along. Rimuru is aware that Maribel may be setting a trap there, so he plans to counter it. The next day, Rimuru's group begins their trip to reach Armita along with Milim. They have made magical guns for their trip. Kagali also plans to go to Amrita alongside Rimuru. Granville wonders if Yuuki is trustworthy, and Maribel plans to use her Greed skill to control Rimuru. Rimuru, Shion, Milim, and Gobta meet up with Kagali, who has a team of explorers joining them. Rimuru summons a gateway that quickly takes them to Distave. They are greeted by a group of Dark Elves who live here.
81	9	"Investigating the Ruins"; Transliteration: "Iseki Chōsa" (Japanese: 遺跡調査)	Unknown	Unknown	TBA	June 5, 2026
The group are led through Clayman's old castle before reaching the entrance to Amrita. Inside is an ancient city. Kagali remembers that the original city it was based on was once the capital of an Elven paradise until it was destroyed by the dragon princess (Milim) as a result of the citizens angering her. This forced them to evacuate to find a new home; Kagali was among them. That was when the Elves arrived in the cave and built Amrita. The ruins also have a population with an artificial sun. Rimuru decides to make the city a part of Milim's territory as long as she allows the citizens to stay in it. They reach the door to the lower levels, which only Clayman could open. Since Rimuru has consumed Clayman, he can use the latter's powers, though the explorers are desperate to learn about it. Though they manage to unlock the door, they decide to rest the rest of the night. The next day, the group enters the lower levels, where they find a mural showing the ancient civilization. Rimuru remembers that Milim's pet dragon was killed during that time. They stop for lunch during this time before navigating through the lower levels and reaching another door with the same magic lock. Meanwhile, Maribel and Yuuki unleash a powerful dragon to attack Rimuru. This causes Rimuru to sense an intruder in the ruins. Milim heads outside to confront the dragon, revealed to be the very same one that Milim sealed years ago, her former pet, which had turned into a beast called the Chaos Dragon; Raphael informs Rimuru of this. Golems attack Rimuru's group. Rimuru opens the door and moves everyone through it. Shion, Gobta, and Ranga manage to defeat all the golems. Maribel arrives to confront Rimuru, revealing that she deems him a threat. With her is Yuuki, Gaiye, and an unnamed knight, who are all under her control. Kagali is shocked by Yuuki's betrayal as Rimuru's team prepares to fight them.
82	10	"The Master of Greed"; Transliteration: "Gōyoku no Shujin" (Japanese: 強欲の主人)	Unknown	Unknown	TBA	June 12, 2026
Shion fights Yuuki while Ranga and Gobta fight the unnamed knight, who seems to have a grudge against Rimuru. Gaiye attacks Rimuru, but the former is quickly killed. Maribel creates a Holy Field around Rimuru and summons backup, but this fails as Rimuru had known what she was planning and had his other subordinates take down her backup. Seeing that her plan to control Rimuru is being compromised, Maribel traps Rimuru using her Greed skill, but this proves ineffective on him. Maribel still refuses to give up, but she is overpowered. Yuuki defeats Shion and turns his attention towards Rimuru. Maribel uses this distraction to escape. Yuuki has a skill called Anti-skill that renders him immune to Rimuru's skills and magic, but Rimuru manages to defeat him. Kagali and the researchers convince Rimuru to spare Yuuki, but the latter reveals that he is now free from Maribel's control. After the unnamed knight is defeated and freed from Maribel's influence, Rimuru learns that he was formerly one of the Three Battlesages, and he wants to avenge Glenda, who was thought to have been killed. The knight then lets go of his grudge upon learning that Glenda is still alive. Rimuru lets Yuuki and Kagali go after Maribel while Shion, Gobta, and Ranga go help the Dark Elves, and Rimuru himself goes to help Milim. Maribel tries to find the reactor in the ruins but discovers nothing. Yuuki and Kagali catch up to her and reveal that they tricked her. Yuuki also reveals that he was just pretending to be under Maribel's control all along, having also created Anti-skill. He then proceeds to stab Maribel and resume his plans for world domination. Maribel tries one final attempt to attack Yuuki but fails as Yuuki steals her Greed skill before she dies. Meanwhile, Milim is still battling the Chaos Dragon.
83	11	"Milim's Friend"; Transliteration: "Mirimu no Tomodachi" (Japanese: ミリムの友達)	Unknown	Unknown	TBA	June 19, 2026
A flashback reveals the origins of the four True Dragons. One of them had a child with a human woman, and the child was given an elemental dragon as a pet. That child is revealed to be Milim, who hasn't given her pet a name yet. The dragon was killed by a nation in an attempt to control Milim, leading her to destroy the nation before being calmed by Ramiris and Guy. The dragon was resurrected into the Chaos Dragon, which forced Milim to seal it away before becoming a Demon Lord. Returning to the present, Rimuru helps Milim fight the Chaos Dragon; he is aware of its backstory. Milim is unwilling to kill her friend. One of the dragon's attacks hits the castle, but Shion, Gobta, Ranga, and the researchers manage to escape in time. Rimuru comes up with an idea to stop the Chaos Dragon without destroying its soul and convinces Milim to trust him. At this point, Maribel's influence on the dragon vanishes as a result of Yuuki killing Maribel, allowing Rimuru to reach its core. Milim finishes off the dragon, destroying its body and triggering a sudden explosion, which Rimuru contains. Rimuru also reveals that he saved the dragon's soul by transferring it into a soul-containing device but can't get it out, though. Milim decides to name the dragon Gaia, transforming the device containing the dragon's soul into an egg with the help of a Master Core. Milim is grateful to Rimuru. Yuuki is pleased that things are going well, but Kagali finds his methods a little scary. Yuuki had intended to use Maribel as a scapegoat, as he had known that the Chaos Dragon would be a problem to his plans if Rimuru was defeated. He also figures that Laplace didn't kill the real Luminous Valentine and that Granville has connections to her. However, he is also planning to meet Granville since he was also under Maribel's control in the first place. Meanwhile, Rimuru decides to turn Amrita into a tourist attraction. Raphael warns Rimuru that Yuuki has ulterior motives. Granville learns of Maribel's death and is devastated.
84	12	"Tempest Evolves"; Transliteration: "Shinka Suru Makokurenpō" (Japanese: 進化する魔国連邦)	Unknown	Unknown	TBA	June 26, 2026
Granville visits his deceased wife, Maria, Maribel's original incarnation, upset with the loss of his granddaughter and that his plan to protect humanity and eliminate the Demon Lords is now compromised. Meanwhile, Rimuru recalls the events that took place in the ruins and the Council but is concerned by the fact that Yuuki and Granville have gone quiet. Rimuru begins his plan to upgrade Tempest now that it is part of the Council and establish new laws to prove to humans that they are not dangerous. Rimuru also gets the idea to have Diablo handle things with the Council. After the meeting, Rimuru meets Kurobe, who had created a new kind of magic sword. He then shows Kurobe his own sword, which is believed to have godly powers. As the train station is being built, Rimuru visits Geld and learns that the majin helping with the construction don't seem interested in working so much, so he gives Geld some encouragement. As Tempest continues to grow, Rimuru visits Youm, Mjurran, and Edgar and learns that Mjurran is pregnant. Rimuru is then called back by Ramiris. She and Veldora show him the newly completed Magitrain, which is powered by an elemental core. Veldora had also summoned a Salamander to make the train function. Treyni also had a hand in building the train with the help of Vampire Overcomers. They later throw a festival that night to celebrate the train's creation. Milim arrives and reveals that Gaia is about to hatch. Milim is finally reunited with her pet.
85	13	"New Companions"; Transliteration: "Atarashī Nakamatachi" (Japanese: 新しい仲間達)	Unknown	Unknown	TBA	July 3, 2026
While Rimuru is busy doing paperwork, Milim arrives and is planning to teach Gaia how to hunt, so they, alongside Ramiris and Veldora, bring Gaia to the Dungeon using their avatars. Frey eventually comes to take Milim home, but Gaia can't go with her, as it can only survive in the Dungeon. As Rimuru gets to work in his research lab in the Dungeon, Diablo contacts him and reveals that he is planning to bring a thousand subordinates. Ramiris also reveals that the new vessels that she, Vesta, and Veldora are making are powered by elemental cores with pseudo souls inside them. However, Ramiris also needs an assistant. Shuna arrives and reveals that they have a visitor: Demon Lord Dino, who reveals that he doesn't have a home now and decides to stay in Tempest. Rimuru doesn't like the idea because of how lazy he is, but after tasting some cream puffs, Dino becomes Rimuru's subordinate. Rimuru reluctantly allows him to stay and work in the Dungeon so as not to upset Guy Crimson. Following a near accident during the vessel creation, Ramiris explains that she wishes to create vessels for the other Dryads. As Vesta puts Dino to work, Veldora also requests an assistant and suggests having Ifrit, who helped Veldora summon the Salamander to power the Magitrain earlier, do the job since they are friends now. Despite remembering how hostile Ifrit is, Rimuru is eventually convinced to release Ifrit and provide a vessel for him, though his new form resembles a woman. Ifrit is renamed Charys by Veldora, causing the former to evolve into a Flame Lord, which grants him the power to switch between gender forms. Eventually, the other Dryads are given new bodies, allowing them to evolve into Dryas Doll Dryads. Meanwhile, Diablo is still searching for subordinates.
86	14	"The Black Numbers"; Transliteration: "Burakku Nanbāzu" (Japanese: 黒色軍団(ブラックナンバーズ))	Unknown	Unknown	TBA	July 10, 2026
During Diablo's search for subordinates in the demon realm, a Greater Demon fights him but is easily defeated multiple times and eventually swears loyalty to him. Diablo starts by fighting the Primordial Jaune to convince her to join Rimuru, who has no interest and instead wants to take him and Rimuru down, but reconsiders after Diablo easily defeats her. He next visits Violet while she is punishing some demons for meddling in her plans and convinces her to join Rimuru, though Violet is at first skeptical. Finally, he recruits Blanc to join despite her being more difficult to convince compared to Jaune and Violet. He had to take down many of her subordinates to get to her. After bringing the three Primordials to Rimuru, they swear loyalty to Rimuru after he reveals his power, which is stronger than theirs. Rimuru grants them bodies and gives them names: Jaune is named Carrera, Blanc is named Testarossa, and Violet is named Ultima. Rimuru does the same to their other 700 subordinates, including the Greater Demon that Diablo defeated before (who is named Venom), and they all evolve into Demon Peers, becoming Rimuru’s army of demons: the Black Numbers.
87	15	"An Unsettling Feeling"; Transliteration: "Fuon'na Kehai" (Japanese: 不穏な気配)	Unknown	Unknown	TBA	July 17, 2026
300 years ago, Luminous speaks with a person, with a Luminary eavesdropping on them. Back in the present, Granville plots to awaken the ultimate weapon in Luminous's position: the mysterious sleeping woman in the Holy Ark. Hinata informs Luminous about what is going on in Tempest. Back in Tempest, Rimuru assigns Carrera, Testarossa, and Ultima jobs in the Council. Tiss and all the other teachers from Engrassia are enjoying the new school in Tempest. Rimuru then meets Kumara, who has now taken a human form and is also attending school. Chloe and the other students then come to meet Rimuru. Meanwhile, Laplace, Footman, and Tear visit Leon Cromwell in disguise, claiming that Rimuru won't allow the summoning of Otherworlders, but Leon is not bothered by it. After the clowns inform Leon about what is going on in the war against the Eastern Nation, Leon sees through their disguises as they tell him that the children that he summoned before are in Tempest. Leon also suspects that Chloe is among them. After the clowns leave, Leon chooses to spare them as he is more focused on the war. He sends his men to investigate Tempest while resuming his search for Chloe. Back in Tempest's school, Kenya and Alice are getting into an argument before Tiss and Rimuru break it up. Fritz and Bacchus then meet Rimuru, revealing that they are also helping the school before they are caught by Hinata, who overheard them mock her. Laplace's group tells Yuuki, Kagali, and Misha, a woman who is taking over for Damrada, about their progress, why Leon was summoning kids from Earth, and that Leon is looking for Chloe. In the Dungeon, Rimuru, Hakuro, and Hinata teach the students how to fight. Hinata reveals that Luminous is inviting Rimuru to a musical conference. He and the students agree to attend. However, Yuuki plans to use this as a distraction so he can awaken the sleeping woman at the direction of Granville in hopes of making Leon target Rimuru before leaving for the East. Granville now deems Luminous his enemy since she has now allied with Rimuru. Luminous begins to worry about Rimuru.
88	16	"Gran, the Hero of Dawn"; Transliteration: "Yoake no Yūsha Guran" (Japanese: 夜明けの勇者グラン)	Unknown	Unknown	TBA	July 24, 2026
A month ago, Luminous learns about Granville and Yuuki's allegiance, which is bad news for her. Further in the past, it is revealed that Granville has sworn loyalty to her. Returning to the present, Rimuru and the students have arrived in Lubelius, where Hinata greets them. Rimuru also brought Takt for the musical conference. After enjoying the feast and the students are sent to bed, Rimuru meets Luminous in her maid disguise. She informs Rimuru about Granville's scheme. Meanwhile, Granville and the Five Elders have a final meeting to form a plan to defeat Rimuru, as their lifespans are ending. Granville also explains that Team Green Fury worship a demon that they believe is a god and assigns the group their posts. Luminous explains to Rimuru that Granville isn't really a saint and that he became a True Hero through a Hero's Egg. A flashback shows Granville, Maria, and an insect general named Razul planning to eliminate the Demon Lords for the sake of humanity but allied with Luminous when he saw that she meant no harm, creating an alliance. During a wedding, a demon attacked them while manipulating a jealous saint to murder Maria. After the saint is killed, Granville kills the demon and the monster that it summoned. Before she dies, she has Granville promise to protect mankind. After the flashback ends, Luminous also reveals that Yuuki is working with Granville. As Hinata and Rimuru watch over the students, Leon senses Chloe's presence; in the past, she treated Leon like a brother as they were friends. Leon also learns of Carrera's disappearance and the students' presence in Lubelius but has his men watch over the messenger who told him this. He suspects him to be a spy and is working with the person who knows that he was summoning Otherworlders. He decides to investigate. However, he and the Moderate Harlequin Alliance don't know that Granville is manipulating them so he can eliminate Rimuru, Luminous, and Leon at the same time. Granville then animates Maria's corpse.
89	17	"Lubelius, the Point of Convergence"; Transliteration: "Shūsoku no ji Ruberiosu" (Japanese: 集束の地ルベリオス)	Unknown	Unknown	TBA	August 7, 2026
Granville, Maria, Razul, and the Five Elders begin their plan to take down Rimuru, Leon, and Luminous with the help of a large army. Meanwhile, Leon visits Elmesia to talk to her regarding the Otherworlder children that Rimuru is taking care of. When he asks her about Chloe, Elmesia agrees to help him and reveals that one of the children is Chloe, but she also warns him about the Five Elders' plan to attack Lubelius. Leon has plans to deal with this and intends for Guy to act against the attack. Though Elmesia warns him that it may be a trap, Leon is already far ahead of her. Back in Lubelius, Diablo and Nikolaus get competitive over serving Rimuru and Hinata. Litus arrives and informs them of the Five Elders' army attacking Lubelius. Rimuru attempts to keep the concert running while fending off the attack. Razul arrives in the concert hall. As Shion and Diablo fight Razul, Rimuru leaves to deal with Granville, who is currently fighting Hinata, Nikolaus, and the Saints. Granville overpowers them all, but they are saved by Rimuru, who notices Maria. Granville intends to avenge Maribel and has brainwashed Otherworlders to attack Rimuru, while Hinata faces Granville as Maria goes to look for Luminous. Rimuru sends Ranga to help Shion as Diablo leaves to confront Rain, one of Guy's subordinates. Luminous senses that Granville is planning to awaken the sleeping woman just as Laplace, Footman, and Maria arrive. Louis and Gunther fight Laplace and Footman, while Luminous fights Maria. Yuuki uses this distraction to free the sleeping woman from the Holy Ark. Diablo eventually defeats Rain, who briefly retreats to bring Guy to him.
90	18	"Turbulence in the West"; Transliteration: "Nishikata Dōran" (Japanese: 西方動乱)	Unknown	Unknown	TBA	August 14, 2026
It turns out Diablo was actually fighting Rain's Body Double earlier. Diablo and Guy then talk about Rimuru and Diablo's evolution. Meanwhile, the Saints are overwhelmed by demons sent by Guy, Leon is on his way to Engrassia, and the Council intends to take action against this attack. Testarossa has sent her subordinates to deal with the problem, jeopardizing and exposing Johann's plan. The barrier protecting Engrassia is disabled, allowing Team Green Fury to confront the Council. Johann confesses his scheme to eliminate the Council for allying with Tempest as Team Green Fury member Ayn summons their goddess, who turns out to be the Primordial Misery, to deal with the Council. Testarossa is unfazed and confronts Misery, making her leave. Girard and Johann are outraged that Testarossa foiled their plan given that they had no idea that Testarossa is also a Primordial. Girard then proceeds to attack Testarosa but is quickly defeated by her subordinate Moss, and a fuming Johann is arrested. Guy learns about what happened to Testarossa, Carrera, and Ultima and that it was Rimuru who named them, which Guy doesn't think was possible. He decides to visit Rimuru someday before he and Rain leave, and Testarossa reactivates the barrier. Meanwhile, Rimuru has defeated the brainwashed Otherworlders but senses that they are not Otherworlders at all and that Granville is stalling them for his true goal. Leon appears and confronts Granville, who provokes him and Rimuru into fighting each other after Granville reveals that both he and Leon were summoning Otherworlder children; however, they are both secretly aware of Granville's motive. By this time, Yuuki has escaped with the body of the sleeping woman but doesn't know what Granville is up to.
91	19	"Death and Disappearance/Death and Loss"; Transliteration: "Shi to Shōshitsu" (Japanese: 死と消失)	Unknown	Unknown	TBA	August 21, 2026
While the war is still going on, Yuuki notices that the woman looks familiar and questions Granville's plan. Meanwhile, during his fight with Leon, Rimuru remembers what Luminous said earlier about Granville. When Hinata fights Granville, she finds herself unable to use her skills to steal his techniques, forcing her to take on her stronger form. Louis manages to overpower Laplace, as Roy's death has strengthened him, forcing Laplace to flee while Louis goes after him; Footman also retreats. Luminous discovers that the sleeping woman is gone and defeats Maria before ordering Gunther to go after the intruders who took her before unleashing a blast of dark energy that gets Leon and Rimuru's attention. Chloe rushes to Rimuru and Leon's location at the same time as Luminous, who is outraged by Granville's traitorous actions. Granvile then absorbs Maria's corpse to restore his youth and empower himself. He overpowers Hinata and also senses her grieving past. He then fires an attack at Chloe, wounding Hinata, Venom, and Leon as they try to protect her, though Leon and Venom survive. Rimuru manages to block the attack. Venom saves Chloe after she falls, and Luminous tries to heal Hinata but is unsuccessful. When a dying Hinata attempts to hand over a bracelet to Chloe, the latter then vanishes. Granville reveals that he had planned for this all along as Luminous prepares to attack him, but before she can do so, the now-awake woman, Chronoa, appears. With her is Yuuki, Laplace, and Footman; Luminous realizes that they were the ones who freed Chronoa, who turns out to be the very same hero who imprisoned Veldora. Granville is pleased that his plan worked with Yuuki's help, as he hopes for Chronoa to defeat the three Demon Lords. Meanwhile, Chloe has been transported to another location.
92	20	"Chronoa the Hero, Part One"; Transliteration: "Yūsha Kuronoa Zenpen" (Japanese: 勇者クロノア・前編)	Unknown	Unknown	TBA	August 28, 2026
Hinata wakes up in a strange void where she sees visions of her past life and begins to remember her past actions. While floating in the void, Chloe's voice urges her to not leave and sync with her. It turns out Hinata's soul is inside of Chloe's mind and that they are 2,000 years in the past, when Lubelius hadn't been built yet. It is revealed that Chloe has the ability to travel into the past due to the spirit of her future self entering her body back in Ramiris's old labyrinth. Furthermore, it turns out Chloe has been repeating the same time cycle over and over again; however, the skill always triggers whenever Hinata is killed, and she always enters Chloe's mind when she is sent back in time, but it was triggered too early this time thanks to Granville killing Hinata. Chloe recalls what happened in the original timeline, but in that timeline's future, Rimuru was killed by the Eastern Empire, which led to Veldora going on a rampage. This resulted in Hinata being killed by someone and Chloe being sent back in time. The two decide to change the outcome to prevent this dark future from happening. Chloe also has Shizu's mask, which Rimuru gave her before. After saving a village, she goes to see Luminous at her old domain: the Night Rose. Though she is denied entry, she reveals that she knows Luminous and wants to warn her that Veldora will attack the city. She is allowed in, and Luminous agrees to the warning but warns her about what happens if she is lying. Chloe then stays in the city and bonds with the residents. Chloe's warning comes to pass when Veldora does indeed appear as Luminous goes to fight him. Hinata discourages Chloe from helping Luminous, as it could change the timeline, so Chloe instead helps the townsfolk. Luminous fends off Veldora, but the city is in ruins. However, Chloe has earned the respect of Luminous and the townsfolk as they evacuate, and Chloe tells Luminous her secret as they search for a new home. Luminous agrees to aid her as Chloe parts ways to take her role as the Chosen Hero. Hinata tells Chloe to use the name Chronoa (revealing that Chloe and Chronoa are both the same person) to conceal her true identity.
93	21	"Chronoa the Hero, Part Two"; Transliteration: "Yūsha Kuronoa Kōhen" (Japanese: 勇者クロノア・後編)	Unknown	Unknown	TBA	September 4, 2026
Hinata suddenly loses her unique skill after giving Chloe the name Chronoa, neither of them understanding why that happened. Chloe travels from town to town protecting villagers from monsters with Hinata's help while using the alias Chronoa. After a hundred years, Chloe has grown into a young adult and now wears Shizu's mask while continuing to slay dangerous monsters. At one point, she visits the newly built Lubelius, where she tells Luminous more about Hinata. After years have passed, Chloe learns that Granville has established the Council of the West. After several more years go by, they learn from Luminous that Veldora is attacking the Great Jura Forest. Hinata decides to deal with Veldora, as she fought him before in the Dungeon back in the present time. With Hinata controlling Chloe's body, she manages to defeat and imprison Veldora in the Sealed Cave. Luminous is grateful for Hinata, and after a celebration, Chloe and Hinata prepare to leave, but Chloe reveals that she is going to lose consciousness because her past self and Leon are going to appear soon. Two versions of her cannot exist at the same time, so Hinata will take control. After talking about future events, while also suspecting that Chronoa has become a monstrous being, Luminous intends to create the Holy Ark to contain Chronoa, unaware that a Luminary has overheard them. When the time arrives, Luminous bids Chloe farewell as she enters her long coma while Hinata takes complete control of her body. Hinata continues to fight as the Chosen Hero in Chloe's place. She eventually meets Shizu, and after fighting and defeating her, she learns of how Shizu ended up in the Central World and is currently trying to maintain control of Ifrit. Hinata gives Shizu her mask to help her control Ifrit, which causes her to remember accidentally killing her childhood friend as Hinata tries to comfort her. The two continue to travel together, but Hinata is worried about Chronoa's growing power and is aware that her past self will soon arrive. She and Shizu soon part ways. Hinata returns to Luminous, who puts her inside the Holy Ark as Hinata also loses consciousness, hoping that Rimuru can stop Chronoa in the future.
94	22	"Where the Soul Resides"; Transliteration: "Tamashī no Arika" (Japanese: 魂の在処)	Unknown	Unknown	TBA	September 11, 2026
A flashback shows Granville telling Yuuki that the weapon that Luminous is guarding is the very same hero who imprisoned Veldora. They plan to use her to eliminate all Demon Lords. After freeing and escaping with Chronoa, the latter then awakens and heads to the castle as Laplace and Footman catch up to Yuuki; however, they begin to worry about where Granville's plan is going. Returning to the present, Rimuru is wondering what is going on and senses that Luminous knows something about Chronoa. Luminous warns Granville about the consequences of freeing Chronoa, which Granville dismisses as he has decided that destroying the world will eliminate the Demon Lords. As Luminous and Granville fight, Chronoa takes on a dark form. Rimuru is warned by Raphael that Chronoa's sword, though the same as Hinata's, matches the level of his sword. Rimuru and Chronoa fight as Luminous recalls past events. Granville reveals that he knows that Chronoa is Chloe and that awakening her consciousness is the only way to bring her back. Seeing that he can't block Chronoa's attacks, Rimuru tricks Chronoa into attacking Yuuki, suspecting that his Anti-skill ability also won't stand a chance. Tear then directs Chronoa into attacking Leon. Seeing that Granville had tricked him and Chronoa is uncontrollable, Yuuki removes the barrier around the city and escapes with the clowns. He hopes that he and Rimuru will fight again someday as he continues his plans for world domination, unsure of who will survive this battle. Under Raphael's suggestion, Rimuru summons Veldora to help him as he can match Chronoa's strength. As Veldora fights Chronoa, Rimuru heals Leon, though they know that even Veldora may not stand a chance against Chronoa. Charys also arrives to help. As Leon prepares himself, Charys protects him while Rimuru goes to help Veldora, and Luminous reveals the truth behind Chronoa's identity, and Rapheal reveals that the young Chloe was sent into the past. Rimuru also remembers the spirit that merged with Chloe in Ramiris's labyrinth and learns that Hinata's soul is inside of Chronoa. Rimuru convinces Leon, now ready, to not kill Chronoa so he can rescue Chloe and Hinata. Diablo warns Rimuru to not reveal his plan, as Guy is observing the city and may try to kill Chronoa. Meanwhile, Shion and Ranga are still fighting Razul.
95	23	"Granville's Hope"; Transliteration: "Guranberu no Kibō" (Japanese: グランベルの希望)	Unknown	Unknown	TBA	September 18, 2026
Sometime in the past, Granville and Maria defeat an insect creature but do not kill him. Seeing that he is an outcast, they invite him to join them and name him Razul, causing him to evolve. Back in the present, Rimuru attempts to find a way to reach Chloe and Hinata. Under Diablo's suggestion, Rimuru attempts to use a skill called Thought Communication, and Charys advices him to use the mask that he gave Chloe earlier to calm Chronoa down. Rimuru replicates the mask. Meanwhile, Kumara and Venom are still protecting the students and orchestra while Shion and Ranga are overwhelmed by Razul, who recalls his meeting with Granville following Maribel's death and intends to fulfill Granville's wish. Though Ranga is weakened, Shion resumes the fight, but she still cannot break through Razul's powerful shell. Shion remembers her childhood and her time with Rimuru. She then undergoes an evolution and, with Ranga's help, kills Razul, who is disappointed that he failed to fulfill Granville's wish before dying and his body vanishes. Granville senses Razul's death and absorbs his soul, but he still intends to keep his promise of hope for his friends and undergoes an evolution as he resumes his fight with Luminous. Granville is eventually defeated. Rimuru fits the mask on Chronoa and enters her mind, where he meets Shizu's spirit. The two approach Chronoa, who calms down and embraces Rimuru. Chronoa explains that she is the Will of Destruction inside of Chloe but also reveals that reaching Chloe and Hinata is not possible now, as Chloe is lost in her heart and Hinata's soul is gone.
96	24	"The Awakening of the Hero"; Transliteration: "Yūsha Kakusei" (Japanese: 勇者覚醒)	Unknown	Unknown	TBA	September 25, 2026
Chronoa reveals that Hinata's soul was shattered by Granville's attack, explaining that her hostility came from Rimuru dying in the future of the original timeline. She also sheds light on what happened to Chloe and Hinata and that saving them now may be impossible, but Shizu is still confident that they can save them. Although Chronoa pinpoints Chloe's location, she cautions that attempting to rescue Chloe might destroy her. With Raphael's help, Rimuru gains a new skill made from Chloe and Hinata's skills, which also allows Chloe to switch between herself and Chronoa at any time. As a result, Rimuru's new skill allows Chloe and Hinata to at last awaken and appear inside of Chronoa's mind with Rimuru and Shizu, though Chrona and Chloe end up fighting over Rimuru. Hinata meets Shizu, who realizes that Hinata is the hero who saved her. As they and Chloe embrace, the area fades to black and Shizu disappears. Back in the real world, Rimuru has put Chronoa to sleep and brings her to Hinata's body. Granville is dismayed that his plan to protect mankind failed but still wagers for Chronoa to defeat all evil in the world. Granville passes something to Luminous to give to Chloe before dying, and his body vanishes. Rimuru and Luminous use their powers to revive Hinata and awaken Chloe, reverting the latter back into a child. Hinata and Leon get jealous when Chloe embraces Rimuru. Granville reunites with Maria in the afterlife, and the two decide to trust Rimuru with protecting humanity for them before going to find Razul. After the concert is finished, Luminous tells Rimuru that Granville's madness came from the loss of Maria and Maribel. They, Veldora, and Leon reveal Chronoa's presence inside of Chloe while Chloe gets annoyed with Leon's obsession with her. While alone, Chloe and Rimuru further talk about Chronoa before Chloe reunites with her classmates. Meanwhile, a plot is going on in the Eastern Empire, operated by a mysterious man with golden hair.
