= I'm Dating a Dark Summoner =

Japanese manga series

- First tankōbon volume cover

ダークサモナーとデキている (Dāku Samonā to Dekiteiru)
- Genre: Erotic comedy; Fantasy; Romantic comedy
- Manga
- Written by: Shaoh
- Published by: Fujimi Shobo
- English publisher: NA: J-Novel Club
- Imprint: Dragon Comics Age
- Magazine: Dra Dra Sharp
- Original run: November 4, 2021 – present
- Volumes: 8
- Anime television series
- Directed by: Seiya Miyajima
- Produced by: Yasuhiro Aoki; Kōta Hashiguchi
- Written by: Seiya Miyajima
- Studio: AtoriE; Nyan Pollution-ω- (production cooperation)
- Licensed by: Sentai Filmworks
- Original network: Tokyo MX, BS11 (censored); AT-X (partially uncensored)
- Original run: October 5, 2026 – present
- Episodes: 2
- icon

I'm Dating a Dark Summoner (Japanese: ダークサモナーとデキている, Hepburn: Dāku Samonā to Dekiteiru) is a Japanese manga series written and illustrated by Shaoh. It began serialization under Fujimi Shobo's Dra Dra Sharp label in November 2021, and has been compiled into eight volumes as of October 2026. A short-form anime television series adaptation produced by AtoriE premiered in October 2026.

== Plot ==
Demi-human Amona and priest Roni are members of the same party, with Roni being distrustful of Amora due to her background. However, after the two somehow end up having sex one night, the two find themselves in a complicated relationship, with both being in denial regarding their lust for each other. Even as their partymates notice them getting closer, the two deny that they are in a romantic relationship.

== Characters ==
Amona (アモナ)
Voiced by: Rei Takano
A demi-human who serves as a dark summoner. She recently joined Haru's party and immediately comes into conflict with Roni, only for them to have sex that night.
Roni (ロニ)
Voiced by: Yūki Nishiyama
A priest in Amona's new party, who wears glasses. He has an uptight personality, believing lust to be blasphemous. He has bad memories from his childhood, including having a wet dream after imagining a girl in a bunny suit.
Imp (インプ, Inpu)
Voiced by: Hōden Tei Senmai
Haru (ハル)
Voiced by: Akane Nishimura
The party leader and swordswoman. She is oblivious to Amona and Roni's activities.
Eury (エウリィ, Euryi)
Voiced by: Maya Ayahane
An elf archer that hails from the Lilylala forest. She is aware of Amona and Roni's antics.

== Media ==
=== Manga ===
Written and illustrated by Shaoh, the manga began serialization under Fujimi Shobo's Dra Dra Sharp label on November 4, 2021, on the ComicWalker (now KadoComi) service, with serialization on the Niconico Seiga service starting on December 24, 2021. The first tankōbon volume was released under Fujimi Shobo's Dragon Comics Age imprint on November 8, 2022; eight volumes have been released as of October 9, 2026.

In November 2026, J-Novel Club announced it had licensed the series for English publication.

No.	Release date	ISBN
1	November 8, 2022	978-4-04-074756-9
2	May 9, 2023	978-4-04-074969-3
3	November 9, 2023	978-4-04-075203-7
4	June 7, 2024	978-4-04-075468-0
5	January 9, 2025	978-4-04-075747-6
6	September 9, 2025	978-4-04-076034-6
7	March 9, 2026	978-4-04-076318-7
8	October 9, 2026	978-4-04-076588-4

=== Anime ===
A short-form anime television series adaptation produced under WWWave Corporation's Deregula anime label was announced on February 20, 2026. The series will be produced by AtoriE in cooperation with Nyan Pollution-ω- and directed and written by Seiya Miyajima, with Takahiro Sasaki designing the characters. It premiered on October 5, 2026, on Tokyo MX and BS11, with AnimeFesta to exclusively stream the full "Deregula" uncensored version. The opening theme song is "Zettai Kansei♡Kisei Jijitsu" (絶対完成♡既成事実), performed by Ringo Coisio, and the ending theme song is "AKUMA♰No?☆Hime♡Goto" (AKUMA♰No?☆ヒメ♡ゴト), performed by Mao Komiya. Sentai Filmworks licensed the series in North America for streaming on Hidive.
