= OceanVeil =

Anime streaming service

- Website type: OTT streaming platform
- Available in: English
- Owner: WWWave Corporation
- Website: https://oceanveil.net/
- Commercial: Yes
- Registration: Optional
- Launched: March 11, 2025; 19 months ago
- Current status: Active

OceanVeil is an over-the-top streaming service owned by the Japanese company WWWave Corporation. It streams both mature and non-mature anime titles.

== History ==
In December 2024, WWWave Corporation announced it was going to launch a streaming service called OceanVeil that streamed both mature and non-mature anime titles. The service soft launched worldwide except Japan on March 11, 2025. The service also formed a partnership with Ascendant Animation to produce English dubs. It is primarily a subscription based service, with a free option with limited content.

In November 2025, OceanVeil partnered with Media Blasters, placing 32 hours of licensed anime on the platform.
