= Yuzuru Tachikawa =

Japanese anime director (born 1981)

- 立川 譲
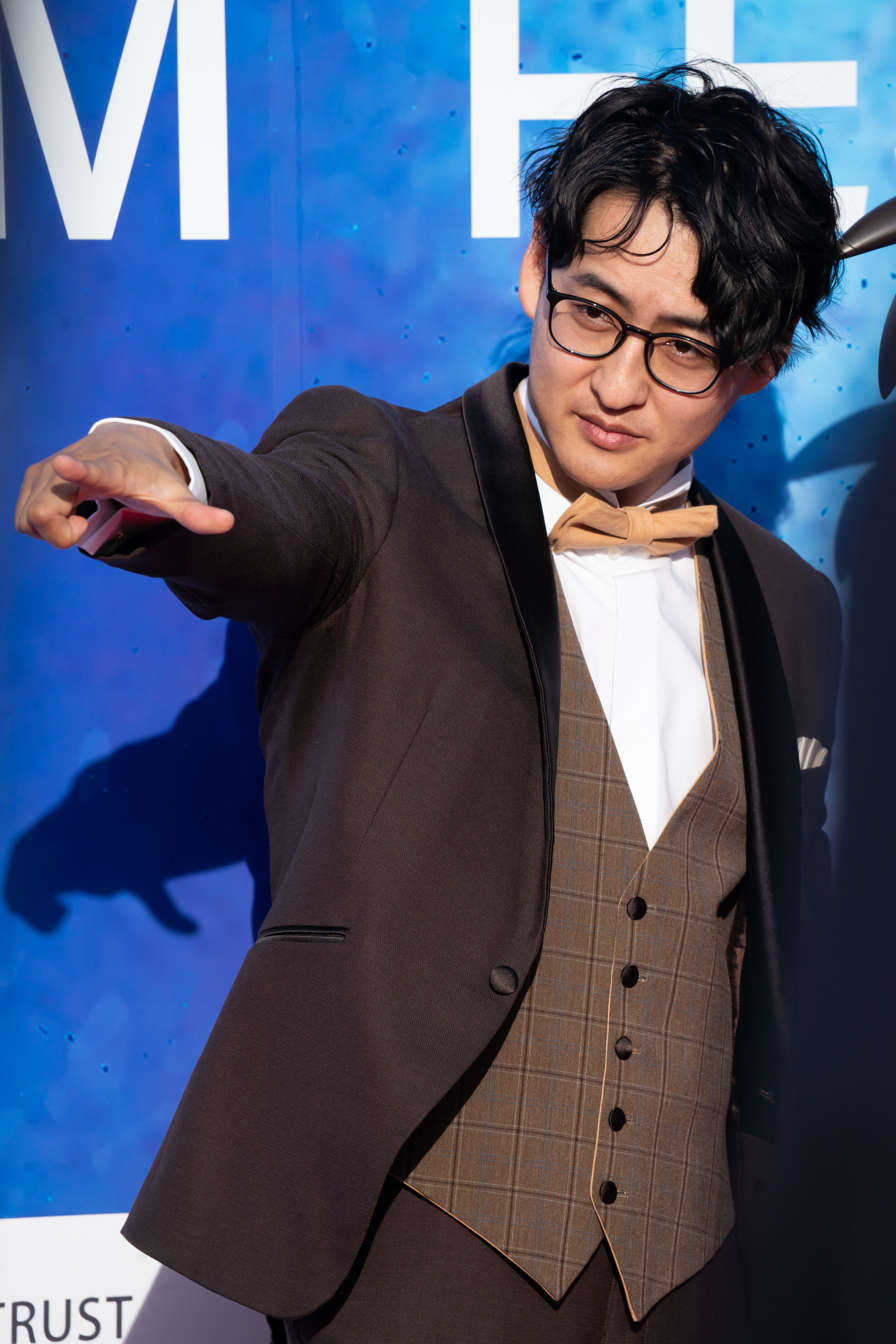
- Tachikawa at the Yokohama International Film Festival in 2023
- Born: December 2, 1981 (age 44); Iruma District, Saitama, Japan
- Education: Nihon University College of Art
- Occupation: Anime director
- Years active: 2007–present
- Known for: Death Parade; Mob Psycho 100; Deca-Dence

Yuzuru Tachikawa (立川 譲, Tachikawa Yuzuru; born December 2, 1981) is a Japanese anime director. Starting his career at Madhouse, he is known for directing the anime series Death Parade, Mob Psycho 100, and Deca-Dence.

== Biography ==
Tachikawa was born in Iruma District, Saitama on December 2, 1981. He graduated from the Nihon University College of Art, and later joined Madhouse as an animation director.

In 2007, Tachikawa made his directorial debut with the final episode of the anime series Kiba. He later became a freelancer. In 2012, he directed the original video animation Arata-naru Sekai. The following year, Tachikawa worked with Madhouse on the anime film Death Billiards as part of the Anime Mirai program. The film later inspired an anime series titled Death Parade, with Tachikawa returning to direct. In 2014, he served as an assistant director for Terror in Resonance.

Tachikawa directed the anime adaptation of Mob Psycho 100 from 2016 to 2022. (Note: Credited as chief director for the third season.) The series received multiple accolades at the Crunchyroll Anime Awards, winning Best Fight Scene and Best Action for the first season, and Best Animation and Best Opening Sequence for the second season. In 2020, he directed the original anime series Deca-Dence, which received three nominations at the 5th Crunchyroll Anime Awards. Tachikawa was nominated twice for Best Director for his work on Mob Psycho 100 and Deca-Dence.

== Works ==
=== TV series ===
- Kiba (2007; episode director)
- Shigurui (2007; episode director)
- MapleStory (2008; storyboards, episode director)
- Bleach (2010–2012; storyboards, episode director)
- Lupin the Third: The Woman Called Fujiko Mine (2012; episode director)
- Sword Art Online (2012; storyboards)
- Terror in Resonance (2014; assistant director)
- Death Parade (2015; director)
- Mob Psycho 100 (2016–2022; director)
- The Saga of Tanya the Evil (2017; storyboards, episode director)
- Inuyashiki (2017; opening sequence director)
- Deca-Dence (2020; director)

=== Films ===
- Bleach: Hell Verse (2010; assistant director)
- Death Billiards (2013; director)
- Case Closed: Zero the Enforcer (2018; director)
- Blue Giant (2023; director)
- Detective Conan: Black Iron Submarine (2023; director)
- Chainsaw Man – The Movie: Reze Arc (2025; storyboards)

=== Original video animation ===
- Arata-naru Sekai (2012; director)
