= Deca-Dence =

Japanese anime television series

- Key visual

デカダンス (Dekadansu)
- Genre: Action; Post-apocalypse; Science fiction
- Created by: Deca-Dence Project (Note: Original work, production committee.); Takuya Tsunoki (Note: Original concept.); Shō Tanaka; Yuzuru Tachikawa; Hiroshi Seko
- Anime television series
- Directed by: Yuzuru Tachikawa
- Produced by: Kazufumi Kikushima; Hiroto Utsunomiya; Aya Iizuka; Tomoyuki Ōwada; Mitsuhiro Ogata
- Written by: Hiroshi Seko
- Music by: Masahiro Tokuda
- Studio: NUT
- Licensed by: Crunchyroll (Note: In North America through Crunchyroll, LLC (formerly known as Funimation).); SEA: Plus Media Networks Asia
- Original network: AT-X, Tokyo MX, TVA, KBS Kyoto, Sun TV, BS11
- English network: SEA: Aniplus Asia; US: Crunchyroll Channel
- Original run: July 8, 2020 – September 23, 2020
- Episodes: 12
- icon

Deca-Dence (Japanese: デカダンス, Hepburn: Dekadansu), stylized in all caps in Latin script, is an original Japanese anime television series produced and animated by NUT. The series aired from July to September 2020.

== Synopsis ==
=== Setting ===
In the latter part of the 2400s, air pollution reached lethal levels. As humanity hurtled toward extinction, they were also threatened by the emergence of life forms known as Gadoll, which caused the destruction of 90% of the world's population. Large corporations developed cyborgs to carry out human functions, but the cyborgs eventually began to outnumber humans and the Solid Quake corporation acquired rights to manage humanity. The company created a giant dome on the Eurasian continent in which they installed a colossal entertainment facility called Deca-dence, with its own independent all-governing system to make all decisions. The cyborg citizens could then safely experience adventure as human avatars at Deca-dence without the risk of real injury.

=== Plot ===
In the fortress city of Deca-dence, the lowly Tanker girl, Natsume, dreams of becoming a Gear warrior following her father's death during a Gadoll attack. She is assigned to a maintenance team led by Kaburagi whom she discovers is more than he appears. Kaburagi has a secret role in eliminating "bugs", humans who threaten Solid Quake's operations. When Kaburagi discovers that Natsume is listed as dead in the company database, he decides to keep her under observation and offers to train her to fight.

== Characters ==
Natsume (ナツメ)
Voiced by: Tomori Kusunoki (Japanese); Trina Nishimura (English)
A teenage Tanker girl who lost her father and her right arm due to a Gadoll attack when she was a child. She has a prosthetic right arm and dreams of joining the Power and fight the Gadoll as a warrior, but after graduating from the Tanker Orphanage, she ends up working under Kaburagi as a maintenance worker.
Kaburagi (カブラギ)
Voiced by: Katsuyuki Konishi (Japanese); Gabe Kunda (English)
A veteran Deca-dence armor repairer with a blunt and surly manner. He was once a great warrior but lost the ardor to fight and spends his days supervising a team on maintenance duties. He follows the cyborg Hugin's orders and spends his nights eliminating "bugs" by removing their chips. His apathetic state of mind changes through his encounter with Natsume, who is determined to become a fighter.
Fei (フェイ)
Voiced by: Mei Shibata (Japanese); Dani Chambers (English)
Natsume's best friend at the Tanker Orphanage.
Fennel (フェンネル, Fenneru)
Voiced by: Eiji Takeuchi (Japanese); Kyle Phillips (English)
One of Natsume's friends at the Tanker Orphanage.
Linmei (リンメイ, Rinmei)
Voiced by: Yoshino Aoyama (Japanese); Kristi Rothrock (English)
A student at the Tanker Orphanage with long purple hair who teases Natsume about her ambitions to become a Gear.
Kurenai (クレナイ)
Voiced by: Eri Kitamura (Japanese); Morgan Garrett (English)
A great female Tanker fighter who Natsume admires.
Hugin (フギン)
Voiced by: Takehito Koyasu (Japanese); Barry Yandell (English)
Commander of Deca-dence who has the responsibility of keeping the entertainment facility of Deca-dence operating effectively for the Solid Quake corporation.
Munin (ムニン)
Voiced by: Kotono Mitsuishi (Japanese); Tia Ballard (English)
A member of the Game Police who is always seen with Hugin.
Minato (ミナト)
Voiced by: Kohsuke Toriumi (Japanese); Brian Mathis (English)
He is second in command of Deca-dence, reporting to Hugin. He is also an old friend of Kaburagi and defies the rules by keeping avatars in stasis after their chips have been removed.
Pipe (パイプ, Paipu)
Voiced by: Eri Kitamura (Japanese); Kimberly Grace (English)
A "bug" which Kaburagi found six years ago and Natsume named Pipe because of its penchant to hold pieces of pipe in its mouth.
Donatello (ドナテロ, Donatero)
Voiced by: Rikiya Koyama (Japanese); Cris George (English)
A self-appointed boss of the bugs in the Bug Correction Facility. He was previously one of Kaburagi's colleagues when he was a warrior.
Jill (ジル, Jiru)
Voiced by: Michiyo Murase (Japanese); Mikaela Krantz (English)
A female bug with high level technical skills.
Sarkozy (サルコジ, Sarukoji)
Voiced by: Yūji Ueda (Japanese); Ian Sinclair (English)
A bug Kaburagi meets at the Bug Correction Facility. While he is known to be cowardly and a pushover, he is capable of acquiring goods. He is known by the nickname "Sark".
Turkey (ターキー, Tākī)
Voiced by: Yutaka Aoyama (Japanese); Jerry Jewell (English)
A bug who is Donatello's henchman. He was previously one of Kaburagi's colleagues when he was a warrior. Thanks to his cruel personality, he likes to pick on the weak.
Mikey (マイキー, Maikī)
Voiced by: Taito Ban (Japanese); Clifford Chapin (English)
One of Kaburagi's colleagues when he was a warrior.
Bug Correction Facility (矯正施設, Kyōsei Shisetsu)
A place deep below Deca-dence where bugs are sent instead of being scrapped for insubordination. Their de facto leader is a Donatello, and other inmates include Jill, Turkey, and Sarkozy.
Gadoll (ガドル, Gadoru)
Beasts which often attack Deca-dence and have been given names such as: octhulhu, avispine, seldurum, spoonwormer, nemollis, burrn, darumoss, megaloain and the gigantic giland. Both the fortress city Deca-dence and the cyborg society under the control of the Solid Quake corporation utilize the liquid oxyone which flows through the Gadoll's veins as their power source.

== Production ==
Deca-Dence was first announced on July 5, 2019, by Kadokawa, and is the first original anime work of NUT, known for producing the anime adaptation of The Saga of Tanya the Evil. It was directed by Yuzuru Tachikawa, written by Hiroshi Seko, featuring original character designs by Pomodorosa, (Note: The pen name is stylized as "pomodorosa".) animation character designs and chief animation direction by Shinichi Kurita, and music composed by Masahiro Tokuda. The Deca-dence fortress was designed by Zhou Haosong, (Note: Zhou Haosong (周浩嵩), surname Zhou, comes from China and uses the pen name Shū Hiromatsu (シュウ浩嵩) in Japan.) the cyborgs were designed by Kiyotaka Oshiyama, and the Gadolls were designed by Satoshi Matsūra. The series was described as being a mash-up between Mortal Engines and Attack on Titan after the first episode was on air.

Director Yuzuru Tachikawa and chief producer Takuya Tsunoki, who had joined Madhouse around the same time and collaborated on the 2015 series Death Parade, had talked about creating their own original work. After the establishment of NUT in 2017, the idea of creating an original work was spurred within the company, and Tsunoki and chief producer Shō Tanaka, who collaborated on NUT's adaptation of The Saga of Tanya the Evil, had talked about "doing something" together. As a result, Tachikawa, Tsunoki, and Tanaka initiated the project. Writer Hiroshi Seko, who had previously worked with Tachikawa on Mob Psycho 100, was eventually added to the project after some foundations had been built and, together, the four created the series' original concepts.

Tachikawa prioritized developing the script for the dramatic beats that he wanted to depict because developing the setting and characters for an original work could take a long time. Having been written in its entirety based on the story concept created by Tachikawa, Tsunoki, Tanaka, and Seko, the script had to be revised from episode one to allow for more foreshadowing and narrative development in the first half of the story, such as brief introductions of the world view, so that the second half would not be so packed. As a result, more time was spent in the script meetings themselves. In this process, they discovered it was important to drill down on the relationship between Kaburagi and Natsume, and therefore put more effort to portray their interactions and how they complement the inefficiencies of each other from episode two to episode four.

While the production team decided to have a world view of "fighting against big monsters", they wanted to add a plot twist on top of it. Tachikawa then came up with the idea that "actually this world is a creation and operated by something else", which was accepted because it was both interesting and could easily allow for added depth when necessary.

The team decided to create new designs for the cyborgs instead of using skeletal or mechanical ones, and it was decided that said cyborgs would be hand drawn instead of being made with 3DCG. The design lightly referenced Doraemon, a robot from the future with a cute design. They also considered the cute, organic design as a mitigation to the violent atmosphere of the story. The designer of the cyborgs, Kiyotaka Oshiyama, had worked with NUT during the production of FLCL Alternative. The staff found Oshiyama's design of mechas to be organic and soft, yet still clearly mecha-like, which suited Deca-Dence, and therefore invited him to join the project.

The design of the cyborgs directly affected that of the Gadolls; while the team thought it was good to use ordinary designs, for example, dragon-like or spider-like monsters, Tachikawa was worried it would make the atmosphere of the story too violent. After Oshiyama's designs were finished, the team decided to make the Gadolls cuter but horrible because that is what those cyborgs would create. The designer of the Gadolls, Satoshi Matsūra, was invited by Tsunoki via the contact listed on Matsūra's Twitter account after Tsunoki occasionally found Matsūra's character designs on the Internet and thought the style was suitable.

== Release ==
While the first episode had an advanced premiere screening at FunimationCon 2020 on July 3, 2020, the series officially aired from July 8 to September 23, 2020, on AT-X and other channels. The opening theme song, "Theater of Life", was performed by Konomi Suzuki, while the ending theme song, "Kioku no Hakobune" (記憶の箱舟; "Ark of Memories"), was performed by Kashitarō Itō.

Funimation licensed the anime for streaming worldwide except for Asia. On August 25, 2020, Funimation announced that the series would receive an English dub. Following Sony's acquisition of Crunchyroll, the series was added to the streaming service. In Southeast Asia, Plus Media Networks Asia licensed the series, and broadcast it on Aniplus Asia.

=== Episodes ===
No.	Title	Directed by	Original release date
1	"Ignition"	Yuzuru Tachikawa	July 8, 2020 (Note: It had an advanced premiere screening on July 3, 2020.)
Teenager Natsume graduates from Tanker Orphanage with dreams of becoming a Gear and fighting the Gadoll, but she is assigned to an armor repair team led by the surly leader Kaburagi. However, she discovers that he has a gentle side and is breaking the rules by keeping what appears to be a small Gadoll as a pet which she names "Pipe". One night, Kaburagi is seen removing a "chip" from a comatose man in a dark alley. While Kaburagi and Natsume are cleaning the exterior of the moving fortress city of Deca-dence, they come under attack by a horde of Gadoll, including one called a "giland" which is almost as big as Deca-dence. Natsume, Kaburagi and two others of the team fall from their positions, and surprisingly Kaburagi proves to be an accomplished warrior. He not only saves Natsume, but also attacks and kills some of the approaching Gadoll. Eventually, Deca-dence moves into defensive action and fires a blast from its canon at the giant Gadoll, destroying it after first draining its oxyone.
2	"Sprocket"	Kei Miura	July 15, 2020
In the aftermath of the Gadoll attack, some Gears lay dead or wounded, but Tankers are already carving up the Gadoll meat. It is then revealed that Deca-dence is run by the Solid Quake corporation as a colossal entertainment facility in the continent called Eurasia which digital beings can safely experience adventure as human avatars with no risk of real injury. However, Mikey makes the decision to break the rules and enhance his abilities by 20% to improve his performance and experience as a Gear, although he risks incurring real physical damage fighting Gadolls. It is also revealed that Kaburagi is working as a recovery agent for Solid Quake by retrieving chips from humans like Mikey who perform prohibited actions. This happens to Mikey who is considered a "bug" risk and is "scrapped". After Natsume sees Kaburagi retrieving a chip, she confronts him, and he offers to train her to fight. Kaburagi then researches Natsume and discovers that she is listed as dead, indicating that she may be a bug. He then decides to observe her and takes her to visit the opulent Gears level of Deca-dence.
3	"Steering"	Hideyuki Satake	July 22, 2020
Kaburagi researches Natsume's "death" and discovers that although her heart stopped after the Gadoll attack in which she lost her arm, she was revived, possibly causing her chip to malfunction making her a bug. He takes Natsume hunting Gadoll and they find a small "spoonwormer" where Kaburagi shows her the basics of the Gadoll defense system and ways to counteract it. She finds fighting it to be more difficult than it looks and suffers some minor injuries, but still aspires to be a great Tanker fighter like her hero, Kurenai, and continues training. Kaburagi then modifies her mechanical hand to become a more effective weapon against the Gadoll, able to launch the spear-like "needles" used to kill the beasts. One day, while Kaburagi and Natsume are out training, Deca-dence comes to a grinding halt from subterranean attack by a horde of Gadoll. Pipe falls into the cavern and, as the Gears rush out to engage the Gadoll, Kaburagi thinks back to six years earlier when he found the bug Natsume now calls Pipe.
4	"Transmission"	Yūji Ōya	July 29, 2020
Kaburagi prepares to fight the Gadoll and Natsume follows him, arming herself with a needle. Gears join the battle, but Natsume panics after seeing some of them killed. She remembers Kaburagi's training and after regaining her composure, effectively engages with the Gadoll herself. A rolling Gadoll breaks through the Gears' defenses but it is killed by Kurenai. Impressed by Natsume's skill, Kurenai invites her to join the Power, and is especially impressed when she sees Kaburagi whom she calls "Kabu". Later, Deca-dence locates the Gadoll nest which is located in an icy wasteland and shrouded in a fog created by a Gadoll they call "alpha". The Power prepares for an all-out assault. Meanwhile, back at Solid Quake, it is predicted that many Gears will be killed in the battle, and Kaburagi is advised not to become involved. Natsume is placed under the care of the triplets, Mindy, Mundy and Mendy, but Kaburagi advises her not to fight, almost revealing to her that the conflict between Deca-dence and the Gadoll is a manufactured fiction. Natsume decides to join the fight anyway and the assault on the Gadoll nest begins.
5	"Differential Gear"	Yutaka Uemura	August 5, 2020
The Gears, including Unit 6 with Kurenai and Natsume, exit Deca-dence in an effort to lift the fog by eliminating Gadoll alpha. Unit 6's assault is initially successful and they enter a huge cavern, but find many dead Gears and Gadoll alpha. The Gadoll is fast and appears to anticipate their moves, causing more casualties until Kaburagi arrives and saves Natsume. He tells her to leave, but she risks her life to get her team to leave. Kaburagi recklessly stays to fight the Gadoll, ignoring Minato's instructions, bypassing his "limiter" to enhance his abilities, and risking changing the existing "storyline". He kills the Gadoll, but this causes the unscripted release of the giant Gadoll, stargate. It advances on Deca-dence which prepares to fire its massive cannon, but the stargate also prepares to fire an energy blast. Kaburagi detects a weakness in the Gadoll and attacks, causing it to misfire and provide time for Deca-dence to destroy it. The following morning, Natsume and the other Gears realize that the Gadoll are not destroyed, but there are many more and the battle will never end. Meanwhile, Kaburagi is punished for his disobedience.
5.5	"Install"	Kei Miura	August 7, 2020
Summary of the first five episodes with some new cuts. Only available online.
6	"Radiator"	Kei Miura	August 12, 2020
Kaburagi is sent to a bug correctional facility instead of being scrapped for insubordination. He and the other bugs find themselves tasked with chopping up Gadoll feces for reprocessing into energy for Daca-dence. Sarkozy explains that no-one has ever left and escape is impossible. However, it is possible to illegally log into the Deca-dence system and he introduces Kaburagi to Donatello, leader of a tough band of bugs who has access. Donatello criticizes Kaburagi for not sticking to his principles in the past and becoming an armor repairer. He challenges Kaburagi to a Death Dive match above the rotating Gadoll feces crushers for a chance to contact Natsume through the Deca-dence link. As Kaburagi is about to win to match, Donatello takes both of them into the cesspit far below. However, Kaburagi uses his rocket backpack to fly them both back to the top. With Kaburagi having proved his resolve, Donatello authorizes Jill to take Kaburagi to the Deca-dence link although he cannot use his former identity to connect. Meanwhile, at the Gadoll Factory Cell Production Room, newly produces Gadoll are being prepared to be released into the field.
7	"Driveshaft"	Yūji Ōya	August 19, 2020
Solid Quake continues its strategy of creating more battles with the Gadoll. This time, a group of Gadoll pour through a breach in the Deca-dence armor and attack the Tankers. Kaburagi, Kurenai, Natsume and other fighters rush to their aid and manage to kill all the Gadoll. Later, Kaburagi questions Minato about the incident and he admits that it is just part of the game plan to reduce the expanding population of human Tankers. Unable to idly await another Gadoll attack, Natsume tries to enlist the aid of the Tankers to repair Deca-dence. Although they are afraid of further Gadoll attacks, her persistence pays off and they eventually agree to help. Kaburagi seeks out Natsume, who does not recognize him in his false identity, but again she impresses him with her determination to achieve her goals. He resolves to stop the endless cycle of Gadoll battles and returns to prison where he convinces Donatello to help him destroy the Gadoll factory.
8	"Turbine"	Hideyuki Satake	August 26, 2020
Donatello and Kaburagi discuss potential ways to get into the Gadoll Factory, but their options are limited. Jill explains that there is a field surrounding the factory that detects chips placed in avatars. Kaburagi suggests that they retrieve his former avatar which has no chip and has been kept in an archive by Minato. Jill tricks Minato into revealing the avatar's location and she uses the secret link to enable herself, Kaburagi, Donatello, Turkey and Sarkozy to enter the archive and successfully steal the avatar. They are almost caught by Hugin who had received a tip about the plot to retrieve Kaburagi's avatar. Kaburagi uses his old avatar to reunite with Natsume and asks her to assist him in destroying the Gadoll Factory, and she agrees in spite of the danger. Minato approaches Kaburagi and tries to convince him to give up on his plan, but Kaburagi refuses. Meanwhile, Turkey, one of Donatello's henchmen, attempts to convince Sarkozy to betray Donatello and Kaburagi.
9	"Turbo Charger"	Hiroyasu Aoki	September 2, 2020
The operation to shut down the Gadoll factory commences, with the bugs polluting the lake above them with smoke to eliminate the in-production Gadoll. Kaburagi and Natsume infiltrate the factory from the outside but encounter Hugin who attacks them. An enhanced security team begins to scrap the bugs, horrifying Sarkozy after Turkey promised their safety in exchange for betraying Kaburagi's plan. Following a performance upgrade by Jill, Donatello arrives to save the remaining bugs and Turkey admits that he and Sarkozy tipped off Hugin. During the battle, Sarkozy is mortally wounded and Turkey flees for his life but Donatello throws him into the cesspit as penance for his insubordination. With the last of his energy, Sarkozy detonates himself and falls into the cesspit, triggering an explosion which destroys the Gadoll factory reactor. This gives Natsume and Kaburagi an opportunity to escape Hugin and reach the control room of the Gadoll Genocide System (GGS) where they shut down production and eliminate all the currently active Gadoll. Kaburagi then begins to tell Natsume the truth behind the existence of himself and Deca-dence.
10	"Brake System"	Kazuya Iwata	September 9, 2020
Kaburagi explains to Natsume that the world she knows was created by the cyborgs. Kaburagi goes on to explain that her father was killed after he came too close to knowing the truth about Deca-dence, which shatters her understanding of her own existence. Meanwhile, staff of the GGS escape from the facility while all the Gadoll disintegrate without the technical support of the system. However, one is wounded by a dying Gadoll and later he is killed when a Gadoll similar to the one which wounded him emerges from his body. Jill informs Kaburagi that the bugs are being rounded up by the Game Police and so Donatello, Jill and Kaburagi help the surviving prison cyborgs escape Deca-dence. They hide in a junkyard of old Deca-dence parts where Jill logs in so that Kaburagi can contact Natsume with his human avatar. Just after they meet and she agrees to help him in his quest, Hugin arrives and kills Kaburagi's avatar. Kaburagi returns to his cyborg body just in time to see a massive Gadoll approach the junkyard.
11	"Engine"	Yūji Ōya	September 16, 2020
A giant crustacean-type Gadoll, with no control chip or identification number, approaches Deca-dence. Hugin, prepares to terminate Natsume, but Kaburagi appears in his alternate avatar body and spears him with a harpoon, saving Natsume. The Gadoll is identified as an Omega type, and Deca-dance fires its cannon towards it with little effect. The Omega retaliates by forcing Deca-dance backwards. The defense team then fire their Solid Cannon at the same time as the Omega fires a high-density oxyone energy blast at Deca-dence and the blasts neutralize each other. The Omega returns to a dormant state, but releases a myriad of small versions of itself which are attacked by the Gears. Minato is informed that Deca-dence will be reverted (Note: Destroyed or eliminated.) along with the omega with spatial compression. Jill proposes that someone could take control of Deca-dence as an avatar, and Kaburagi volunteers. He approaches the Core Room where Minato tries to dissuade him. Minato eventually agrees to help Kaburagi as he attempts to connect with Deca-dence. Outside, Natsume meets Jill and some other cyborgs for the first time and realizes what they really look like.
12	"Decadence"	Yuzuru Tachikawa	September 23, 2020
Kaburagi succeeds in connecting with Deca-dence, but finds that he is unable to move. To rectify this, Minato announces a final mission for the players to gather old parts of Deca-dence. Kaburagi engages with the control system itself and when he asserts that he will change the world outside of it, the system does not resist. Kaburagi uses Deca-dence with the assistance of Natsume and the other Tankers to gather the refueled old parts to form a new cannon. Releasing the limiters on Deca-dence, Kaburagi fires the cannon and successfully takes out the Omega. The sheer energy output causes Deca-dence to collapse, and Kaburagi reaches his operational limit and shuts down. Natsume finds his body among the rubble and tearfully thanks him for everything he's done for her. Three years later, Minato has become the new system administrator for Deca-dence City with Jill as his secretary, rebuilt from the ruins of Deca-dence. Cyborgs, humans and even friendly Gadolls live together in harmony, and Natsume has become a tour guide. Jill reveals to Minato that she had reserved some of Kaburagi's data in a backup, and as Natsume finishes another tour, she reunites with the revived Kaburagi in his old avatar.

== Reception ==
Christopher Farris of Anime News Network gave the final episode a score of 3 out 5 stars, concluding that the producers "didn't come down as definitively as they could with an alternative to that accursed capitalism, or manage to wrap everything with satisfyingly-tied emotional bows. But by god did they try".

The Encyclopedia of Science Fiction described Deca-Dence as an exciting and ambitious anime, praising its humor, inventive details and unconventional treatment of virtual reality and video game conventions. It particularly highlighted the series' reversal of expectations, in which the cyborg players and their everyday environment resemble a video game, while the game world inhabited by humans appears realistic. The encyclopedia also noted its themes of resistance to oppression and corporate power, interpreting the story as a critique of the exploitation of both humans and cyborgs. However, it criticized the ending as bland and insufficiently developed, arguing that the seemingly abrupt disappearance of the corporations' oppressive influence undermined the series' social commentary and its message of collective resistance.
