= With You and the Rain =

Japanese manga series

- First tankōbon volume cover

雨と君と (Ame to Kimi to)
- Genre: Comedy; Iyashikei
- Manga
- Written by: Ko Nikaido
- Published by: Kodansha
- English publisher: NA: Kodansha USA (digital)
- Imprint: Young Magazine KC
- Magazine: Weekly Young Magazine
- Original run: August 17, 2020 – present
- Volumes: 8
- Anime television series
- Directed by: Tomohiro Tsukimisato
- Written by: Touko Machida
- Music by: Rei Ishizuka
- Studio: Lesprit
- Licensed by: Crunchyroll; SA/SEA: Medialink
- Original network: ANN (TV Asahi), BS Asahi
- Original run: July 6, 2025 – September 21, 2025
- Episodes: 12
- icon

With You and the Rain (Japanese: 雨と君と, Hepburn: Ame to Kimi to) is a Japanese manga series written and illustrated by Ko Nikaido. It has been serialized in Kodansha's seinen manga magazine Weekly Young Magazine since August 2020. A 12-episode anime television series adaptation produced by Lesprit aired from July to September 2025.

== Plot ==
Fuji is a reclusive novelist who lives alone. One rainy evening, while returning home soaked from the rain, she discovers an abandoned animal inside a cardboard box. Peering at the damp creature, she tentatively wonders whether it might be a dog. The animal responds by writing on a sketchpad: "I am a dog" and "I am easy to take care of". Convinced by these assertions, Fuji decides to take it home, naming the creature "You", and the two begin living together. Though acquaintances occasionally question You's true nature, Fuji consistently introduces it as a mixed-breed dog. Each time doubts arise, You reaffirms its canine identity through written messages. Their daily life unfolds quietly—Fuji, reserved and introspective, and You, clever and expressive—their interactions forming a gentle rhythm of companionship.

== Characters ==
Fuji (藤)
Voiced by: Saori Hayami (Japanese); Alexis Tipton (English)
Fuji is a novelist characterized by her relaxed and introverted demeanor, though she possesses a deeply sensitive nature. She has a particular fondness for rainy weather. During the rainy season, she encountered You inside a cardboard box and subsequently chose to cohabit. Fuji regards You as a gifted mutt and derives great pleasure from their companionship.
You (君, Kimi)
Voiced by: Anna Mugiho (Japanese); Derick Snow (English)
During the rainy season, Fuji encountered an unnamed canine—referred to only as "You"—and took him in. You exhibits a curious and guileless disposition, with his emotions often manifesting plainly through his behavior. Demonstrating notable intelligence, he comprehends human speech and communicates by writing words on flip charts. His primary affinities include food and the company of Fuji, with whom he shares a close bond.
Kii Ella Krause (クラウゼ・エラ・希依, Kurauze Era Kii)
Voiced by: Yuzu Yumoto (Japanese); Lara Woodhull (English)
A well-mannered and inquisitive first-grade student, she resides adjacent to Fuji's home. As a pupil at an international school, her mixed heritage includes a German mother and Japanese father. She owns a pet dog named Kinako and demonstrates particular interest in You. Her curious nature manifests in frequent observations about the unusual pet next door.
Tatsuo (辰雄)
Voiced by: Yōji Ueda (Japanese); Brian Mathis (English)
Fuji's father. A seemingly stern but fundamentally warm-hearted person, he demonstrates deep familial devotion through frequent visits to his daughter Fuji's residence. Despite his initially intimidating appearance, he possesses an unexpectedly playful disposition. His visits, while motivated by care, result in Fuji's avoidance behavior that leaves him experiencing subtle loneliness.
Michiko (道子)
Voiced by: Mie Sonozaki (Japanese); Leslie Collins (English)
A composed and articulate woman, she serves as the stabilizing presence in the family unit. Her demeanor is marked by measured speech and deliberate actions, with particular attention devoted to her husband Tatsuo's well-being. She enforces strict household prohibitions against smoking and excessive snacking, reflecting her health-conscious values. She maintains a detached attitude towards You.
Veterinarian (獣医さん, Jūi-san)
Voiced by: Chafurin (Japanese); R. Bruce Elliott (English)
A compassionate veterinary practitioner operating a clinic in proximity to Fuji's residence. He maintains professional familiarity with You since their initial encounter.
Mimi (ミミ)
Voiced by: Yuna Kamakura (Japanese); Dani Chambers (English)
Ren (レン)
Voiced by: Satomi Satō (Japanese); Sara Ragsdale (English)
Teru (テル)
Voiced by: Kikunosuke Toya (Japanese); Aiden Call (English)
Wako (ワコ)
Voiced by: Yumiri Hanamori (Japanese); Francine Gonzalez (English)
Hiura (日浦)
Voiced by: Shūhei Sakaguchi (Japanese); Ricco Fajardo (English)
Hojo (北條, Hōjō)
Voiced by: Mitsuho Kambe (Japanese); Robin Clayton (English)
Arata (アラタ)
Voiced by: Yume Miyamoto (Japanese); Amber May (English)

== Media ==
=== Manga ===
Written and illustrated by Ko Nikaido, With You and the Rain debuted in Kodansha's seinen manga magazine Weekly Young Magazine on August 17, 2020. Kodansha has collected its chapters into individual tankōbon volumes. The first volume was released on March 5, 2021. As of July 4, 2025, eight volumes have been released.

In North America, the manga has been licensed for English digital release by Kodansha USA and the first volume was published on November 23, 2021.

==== Volumes ====
No.	Original release date	Original ISBN	English release date	English ISBN
1	March 5, 2021	978-4-06-522583-7	November 23, 2021	978-1-63-699472-7
2	September 6, 2021	978-4-06-524749-5	December 28, 2021	978-1-63-699536-6
3	March 4, 2022	978-4-06-527052-3	August 23, 2022	978-1-68-491409-8
4	September 6, 2022	978-4-06-529068-2	February 28, 2023	978-1-68-491718-1
5	May 8, 2023	978-4-06-531378-7	August 29, 2023	979-8-88-933107-0
6	December 6, 2023	978-4-06-533932-9	May 28, 2024	979-8-88-933496-5
7	September 5, 2024	978-4-06-535820-7	February 11, 2025	979-8-89-478368-0
8	July 4, 2025	978-4-06-540170-5	December 9, 2025	979-8-89-478804-3

=== Anime ===
In August 2024, it was announced that the manga would receive an anime television series adaptation. The series is produced by Lesprit and directed by Tomohiro Tsukimisato, with series composition by Touko Machida, characters designed by Ayano Ōwada, animals designed by Ryo Yatate, and music by Rei Ishizuka. It aired from July 6 to September 21, 2025, on the NUMAnimation programming block on ANN affiliates, including TV Asahi, as well as BS Asahi. (Note: TV Asahi listed the series' air dates on Saturday at 25:30, which is effectively Sunday at 1:30 a.m. JST.) The opening theme song is "Ame to" (雨と; 'Rain and') (also known as "Chuva"), performed by Mamiko Suzuki, while the ending theme song is "Filled", performed by Kei Sugawara.

Crunchyroll will stream the series. Medialink licensed the series in South, Southeast Asia and Oceania (except Australia and New Zealand) for streaming on its Ani-One Asia's YouTube channel.

==== Episodes ====
No.	Title	Directed by	Written by	Storyboarded by	Original release date
1	"Rainy Days"; Transliteration: "Amamoyō" (Japanese: 雨模様)	Tomohiro Tsukimisato	Tōko Machida	Tomohiro Tsukimisato	July 6, 2025
2	"The Evening Sun"; Transliteration: "Nishibi" (Japanese: 西陽)	Tomoko Takatsu	Tōko Machida	Tomoko Takatsu	July 13, 2025
3	"Friends"; Transliteration: "Tomodachi" (Japanese: 友達)	Hitomi Ezoe	Michiko Yokote	Hitomi Ezoe	July 20, 2025
4	"Summer Festival"; Transliteration: "Natsu Matsuri" (Japanese: 夏祭り)	Tomoko Takatsu	Tōko Machida	Tomoko Takatsu	July 27, 2025
5	"The Same Moon"; Transliteration: "Onaji Runa" (Japanese: 同じ月)	Tomoko Takatsu	Tōko Machida	Tomoko Takatsu	August 3, 2025
6	"The Cat and Pumpkins"; Transliteration: "Neko to Kabocha" (Japanese: 猫と南瓜)	Harume Kosaka	Michiko Yokote	Kyo Yatate	August 10, 2025
7	"It's Nothing"; Transliteration: "Nan Demonai" (Japanese: なんでもない)	Hitomi Ezoe	Michiko Yokote	Hitomi Ezoe	August 17, 2025
8	"The Cry"; Transliteration: "Nakigoe" (Japanese: 鳴き声)	Tomohiro Tsukimisato	Michiko Yokote	Tomohiro Tsukimisato	August 24, 2025
9	"A Secret"; Transliteration: "Himitsu" (Japanese: 秘密)	Harume Kosaka	Michiko Yokote	Tomohiro Tsukimisato	August 31, 2025
10	"A River That Cannot Be Crossed"; Transliteration: "Watarenai Kawa" (Japanese: 渡れない川)	Tomohiro Tsukimisato	Tōko Machida	Tomohiro Tsukimisato	September 7, 2025
11	"New Things, Old Things"; Transliteration: "Atarashī Mono, Furui Mono" (Japanese: 新しいもの、古いもの)	Tomoko Takatsu	Tōko Machida	Tomoko Takatsu	September 14, 2025
12	"I Can Hear the Sound of the Rain"; Transliteration: "Ame no Otoga Kikoeru" (Japanese: 雨の音が聞こえる)	Tomohiro Tsukimisato	Tōko Machida	Tomohiro Tsukimisato	September 21, 2025

== Reception ==
In a review of the first two volumes, Rebecca Silverman of Anime News Network praised the series for its art and its story, stating, "With You and the Rain is a slow, sweet story about the bond between a woman and her pet. Does it matter what the pet is? Maybe, but I think the main appeal of this series is how simple it is to just sit back and enjoy the ride."

The series was nominated for the 2022 Next Manga Award in the print manga category and was placed fourth out of 50 nominees.
