= Young Animator Training Project =

Annual project to support training animators

The Young Animator Training Project (若手アニメーター育成プロジェクト, Wakate Animētā Ikusei Purojekuto) is an annual project launched in 2010, and funded by the Japanese government's Agency for Cultural Affairs in order to support training animators. The project culminates in a series of anime shorts produced by various animation studios each year called:

- Project A, released in 2011
- Anime Mirai (アニメミライ; lit. 'Anime Future'), released in 2012–2015
- Anime Tamago (あにめたまご; lit. 'Anime Egg'), released in 2016–2020
- Anime no Tane (あにめのたね; lit. 'Anime's Seed'), released since 2021

== History ==
The project was launched by Japanese Animation Creators Association (JAniCA) in 2010. The animation labor group received 214.5 million yen (about US$2.27 million) from the Japanese government's Agency for Cultural Affairs, and it distributed most of those funds to studios to train young animators on-the-job during the year. One of the reasons for the support of the Agency for Cultural Affairs is the concern that more of the Japanese animation process is being outsourced overseas—thus leading to a decline in opportunities to teach animation techniques within Japan. In 2011 the Agency once again provided funding for JAniCA to select more young training projects under the same budgets.

In April 2014, JAniCA announced that they are no longer running the initiative. Later it was announced that The Association of Japanese Animations (AJA) will run the project.

== Animations ==
The following animations were created out of the funding provided by the Young Animator Training Project. Animation studios bid for funding, and each year, four studios are selected to produce short films. All short films air in theaters each year in March.

=== Project A ===
The following shorts were produced in 2010.

- Kizuna Ichigeki (キズナ一撃; lit. Bond Strike) - Ascension
- Ojii-san no Ranpu (おぢいさんのランプ; lit. The Old Man's Lamp) - Telecom Animation Film
- Bannō Yasai Ninninman (万能野菜 ニンニンマン; lit. Versatile Vegetable Nininman) - P.A. Works
- Tansu Warashi. (たんすわらし。; lit. Wardrobe Dwellers) - Production I.G

=== Anime Mirai 2012 ===
The following shorts were produced in 2011.

- BUTA - Telecom Animation Film
- Wasurenagumo (わすれなぐも; lit. Little Spider Girl) - Production I.G
- Shiranpuri (しらんぷり; lit. Minding My Own Business) - Shirogumi
- Pukapuka Juju (ぷかぷかジュジュ; lit. Dudu the Floatie) - Answer Studio

=== Anime Mirai 2013 ===
The following shorts were produced in 2012.

- Ryo (龍 -RYO-) - Gonzo
- Little Witch Academia (リトル ウィッチ アカデミア, Ritoru Witchi Akademia) - Trigger
- Aruvu Rezuru - Kikaijikake no Yōsei-tachi (アルヴ・レズル -機械仕掛けの妖精たち-; lit. Arve Rezzle - Mechanical Fairies) - Zexcs
- Death Billiards (デス・ビリヤード, Desu Biriyādo) - Madhouse

Aruvu Rezuru replaced an intended short, TV Kazoku Channel Jacker, that was to be produced by Pierrot.

=== Anime Mirai 2014 ===
The following shorts were produced in 2013.

- Harmonie (アルモニ, Arumoni) - Ultra Super Pictures
- Ōkii Ichinensei to Chiisana Ninensei (大きい一年生と小さな二年生; lit. The Big First Year Student and the Little Second Year Student) - A-1 Pictures
- Paroru no Miraijima (パロルの未来島; lit. Parol's Future Island) - Shin-Ei Animation
- Kuro no Sumika -Chronus- (黒の栖-クロノス-, lit. Black Nest -Chronus-) - Studio 4°C

=== Anime Mirai 2015 ===
The following shorts were produced in 2014.

- Aki no Kanade (アキの奏で; lit. Aki's Rhythm) - J.C.Staff
- Happy★ComeCome (ハッピーカムカム; Happii Kamukamu) - SynergySP
- Ongaku Shōjo (音楽少女; lit. Music Girls) - Studio Deen
- Kumi to Chūrippu (クミとチューリップ; lit. Kumi and Tulips) - Tezuka Productions

=== Anime Tamago 2016 ===
The following shorts were produced in 2015. This is the first year after The Association of Japanese Animations (AJA) took over this project and renamed it to Anime Tamago.

- Colorful Ninja Iromaki (カラフル忍者いろまき, Karafuru Ninja Iromaki) - Signal.MD
- UTOPA - Studio 4°C
- Kacchikenee! (かっちけねぇ!) - Tezuka Productions
- Kaze no Matasaburō (風の又三郎) - Buemon

=== Anime Tamago 2017 ===
The following shorts were produced in 2016.

- Charanpoland no Bōken (ちゃらんぽ島の物語; lit. The Charanpoland Adventure) - Studio Comet
- Red Ash: Gearworld - Studio 4°C
- Genbanojō (げんばのじょう-玄蕃之丞-) - Nippon Animation
- Zunda Horizon (ずんだホライずん, Zunda Horaizun) - WAO Corporation, Studio Live, SSS-Studio

=== Anime Tamago 2018 ===
The following shorts were produced in 2017.

- Time Driver: Bokura ga Kaita Mirai (TIME DRIVER 僕らが描いた未来; lit. Time Driver: The Future We Drew) - Imagica Image Works, Robot
- Engimon (えんぎもん) - Studio Nanahoshi, Usagi.Ou
- Milky Panic Twelve (ミルキーパニック twelve, Mirukii Panikku twelve) - Tomason
- Midnight Crazy Trail - Picona

=== Anime Tamago 2019 ===
The following shorts were produced in 2018.

- Hello WeGo! (ハローウィーゴ！) - Wit Studio
- Chuck Shimezou (チャックシメゾウ) - Nippon Animation
- Fight! Space Attendant Aoi (斗え！スペースアテンダントアオイ) - Keica, Griot Groove
- Captain Baru (キャプテン・バル) - Flying Ship Studio

=== Anime Tamago 2020 ===
The following shorts were produced in 2019.

- Ometeotoru≠HERO (オメテオトル≠HERO, Ometeotoru≠Hīrō) - Speed Inc.
- The Chronicles of Rebecca (レベッカ, Rebekka) - Vega Entertainment _{[ja]}
- Michiru Rescue! (みちるレスキュー！, Michiru Resukyū!) - Yumeta Company

=== Anime no Tane 2021 ===
The following shorts were produced in 2020. While the name was changed, AJA is still in charge of the project. Shorts produced for Animenotane are 7-10 minutes, instead of the usual 24 in previous years.

- DELIVER POLICE/Nishi-Tōkyō-shi Deliver Keisatsu-tai (西東京市デリバー警察隊, lit. West Tokyo City Delivery Police Force) - Imagica
- Hachimitsu Suicide Machine (ハチミツスーサイドマシーン) - Usagi ou inc.
- HOME! - Orange
- Ryūsatsu no Kyōkotsu (龍殺ノ狂骨; lit. The Dragon-Slaying Kyōkotsu (狂骨)) - Tsumugi Akita Anime Lab

=== Anime no Tane 2022 ===
The following shorts have been announced for production in 2021

- Tenjin (天神, lit. Heavenly God) - Imagica
- Rockin' Oyone (ロックンおヨネ) - Studio Elle
- Uchū Camper Chicchi (宇宙キャンパー・チッチ, lit. Space Camper Chicchi) - Production +h
- Kirakira Kirari☆ (キラキラきらり☆, lit. Sparkling Sparkle) - Lesprit

=== Anime no Tane 2023 ===
The following shorts have been announced for production in 2022.

- NICO/AGONY - Usagi-ou
- Wander Burabura Bakkamu - Echoes
- MoshiMeta -Moshi Mesukōsei ga Metaverse de Miko ni Nattara- (もしメタ -もし女子高生がメタバースで巫女になったら-, lit. MoshiMeta -What If a High School Girl Became a Shrine Maiden in the Metaverse-) - Studio L
- Tsuru ga Mau Yoru ni (鶴が舞う夜に, lit. On the Night When Cranes Dance) - Noovo, pH Studio

=== Anime no Tane 2024 ===
The following shorts have been announced for production in 2023.

- Pop Pop City - Graphinica
- BRIDGE -My Little Friends- - Studio Gooneys
- KICKS and PUNK - Nippon Animation
- Ephemere (エフェメール) - Noovo, Studio Eight Colors

=== Anime no Tane 2025 ===
The following shorts have been announced for production in 2024.

- Galaxy Apartment☆Cosmo hills (ギャラクシーアパート☆コスモヒルズ, Gyarakushī Apāto ☆ Kosumo Hiruzu) - Seven Arcs
- Sora and the Big Tree (星の子どもとはじまりの樹, Hoshi no Kodomo to Hajimari no Ki) - Buemon
- TRUST - Polygon Pictures
- DIVE IN! - Lesprit
