= Death Parade =

Japanese anime television series

- Key visual

デス・パレード (Desu Parēdo)
- Genre: Psychological thriller
- Created by: Yuzuru Tachikawa
- Anime film

Death Billiards
- Directed by: Yuzuru Tachikawa
- Produced by: Takuya Tsunoki; Toshio Nakatani
- Written by: Yuzuru Tachikawa
- Music by: Kotaro Tanaka
- Studio: Madhouse
- Licensed by: NA: Funimation
- Released: March 2, 2013
- Runtime: 25 minutes
- Anime television series
- Directed by: Yuzuru Tachikawa; Jun Shishido (Note: Chief unit director (演出チーフ))
- Produced by: Toshio Nakatani; Kojiro Naotsuka; Hiroyuki Inage; Shunsuke Nara; Ayuri Taguchi
- Written by: Yuzuru Tachikawa
- Music by: Yuki Hayashi
- Studio: Madhouse
- Licensed by: AUS: Madman Entertainment; NA: Funimation; UK: Anime Limited (cancelled)
- Original network: Nippon TV
- Original run: January 9, 2015 – March 27, 2015
- Episodes: 12
- icon

Death Parade (Japanese: デス・パレード, Hepburn: Desu Parēdo) is a Japanese psychological thriller anime series created, written, and directed by Yuzuru Tachikawa and produced by Madhouse. The series was spawned from a short film, Death Billiards, which was originally produced by Madhouse for the Young Animator Training Project's Anime Mirai 2013 and released in March 2013. The series aired between January and March 2015. It is licensed in North America by Funimation and in the United Kingdom by Anime Limited. The series was obtained by Madman Entertainment for digital distribution in Australia and New Zealand.

== Plot ==
Whenever someone dies, they are sent to one of many mysterious bars run by bartenders serving as arbiters inside a tower in the afterlife. There, they must compete in Death Games with their souls on the line, the results of which reveal what secrets led them to their situation and what their fate will be afterwards, with the arbiters judging if their souls will either be sent for reincarnation or banished into the void. The series follows Decim, the lone bartender of the bar where people who died at the same time are sent to, known as the Quindecim bar, and his assistant.

== Characters ==
=== Main characters ===
Decim (デキム, Dekimu)
Voiced by: Tomoaki Maeno (Japanese); Alex Organ (English)
The bartender of the Quindecim bar (located on the 15th floor) who oversees the Death Games between people who have died and must be judged. His hobby is making mannequins that resemble guests who have made an impression on him. He is supposed to have no human emotions, just like all arbiters who are referred to as dummies because they have never lived or died. As a risky experiment, Nona allows him to develop his interest in learning about human emotions.
The Assistant (アシスタント, Ashisutanto)
Voiced by: Asami Seto (Japanese); Jamie Marchi (English)
Decim's assistant, who has been learning the methods that arbiters use to judge human souls and helping Decim learn about human behavior. Initially credited as "the black-haired woman" (黒髪の女, kurokami no onna), she is ultimately revealed to be a human, Chiyuki (知幸, Chiyuki), rendered amnesiac by Decim to become his assistant and an Arbiter after she had arrived in the afterlife on her death with all memories of her life and the process of passage between life and death intact, seen by the Arbiters as a message from the missing God.

=== Other Arbiters ===
Nona (ノーナ, Nōna)
Voiced by: Rumi Ōkubo (Japanese); Jad Saxton (English)
Decim's boss, with the appearance of a young woman. She reports to Oculus and manages the arbiters, primarily working on the 90th floor and sometimes overseeing the games.
Ginti (ギンティ, Ginti)
Voiced by: Yoshimasa Hosoya (Japanese); Robert McCollum (English)
An arbiter bartender who runs and oversees death games in the Viginti Bar on the 20th floor. He does not get along well with Decim and disapproves of his reliance on Chiyuki, although their relationship is not antagonistic.
Clavis (クラヴィス, Kuravisu)
Voiced by: Kōki Uchiyama (Japanese); Z. Charles Bolton (English)
An ever helpful elevator attendant who is always smiling.
Quin (クイーン, Kuīn)
Voiced by: Ryōko Shiraishi (Japanese); Anastasia Muñoz (English)
A member of the information bureau who ran the Quindecim bar before Decim took her place after she moved into the information center, hence its name, Quindecim.
Castra (カストラ, Kasutora)
Voiced by: Ryōka Yuzuki (Japanese); Morgan Garrett (English)
A woman in a skull helmet who oversees deaths across the world and decides which souls are sent to which arbiters.
Oculus (オクルス, Okurusu)
Voiced by: Tesshō Genda (Japanese); Jeremy Schwartz (English)
A powerful being with a lotus-like beard and hair who was close to the missing God and manages the arbiter system. He spends his free time playing galactic pool.

=== Players ===
Man (男, Otoko)
Voiced by: Yuichi Nakamura
He appeared in "Death Billards" as a cocky young man in his 30s who came in before Roujin at Quindecim. He and Roujin were forced to play a game of billiards that would decide their fate. In the midst of the game, he was completely surprised when he underestimated Roujin who, at his advance age, was already beating him in the game and was able to defend himself after he lunged at him with a cue stick. After the confrontation, he was able to recall that he is already dead and that he died at the hands of his girlfriend who murdered him after he cheated on her. At the end of the game, he and Roujin both were led to the elevator to reincarnation and the void, respectively.
Elderly Man (老人, Rōjin)
Voiced by: Jun Hazumi
He appeared in "Death Billards" who died of natural causes. He arrived in the Quindecim after Otoko, where they were both made to play a game of billiards that would decide their fate. Unlike Otoko, who is cocky and aggressive, he is calm and level-headed. Even when in the face of a confrontation with the latter, he was able to defend himself from Otoko's assault. At the end of the game, they were led to the elevator by Decim where it was not known as to what their fate has become. Before entering the elevator, he whispered something to Decim whose details are unknown. In the final scene, he was seen with a smirk on his face as he has been sent to the void.
Takashi (たかし, Takashi)
Voiced by: Kazuya Nakai (Japanese); Eric Vale (English)
The first to play the game. He and his wife Machiko enter a darts game with their lives staked on it. After suspecting Machiko had an affair, he sets out to win the game, later learning his suspicions and jealousy drove him and his wife to their deaths. He ends up losing but Decim decides to send his soul for reincarnation rather than into the void.
Machiko (真智子, Machiko)
Voiced by: Ayako Kawasumi (Japanese); Trina Nishimura (English)
The first to play the game. She and her husband Takashi play a game of darts, believing their lives staked on it. After admitting to committing an affair and claiming that she married Takashi for his money, she landed the winning shot. Takashi tries to attack her only to be stopped by Decim. Although she wins the game, Decim decides to sends her soul to the void. It is later suggested that she lied about her baby being another man's child to lessen Takashi's guilt about having killed his own baby, implying that she did truly love him. Although Chiyuki notices this, it was too late for Decim to reverse his judgment. It is later revealed that Machiko cheated, but the assistant (black-haired girl) suggests that Takashi's jealousy had driven his poor wife to commit something she would forever regret. Her husband's constant jealousy and mistrust towards her lead to her cheating out of frustration, something which she regretted immensely.
Shigeru Miura (三浦 しげる, Miura Shigeru)
Voiced by: Junji Majima, Lynn (young) (Japanese); Micah Solusod (English)
He is a college student who awakens at Quindecim and reunites with his childhood friend Mai. He plays Death Bowling against her, later learning that they died in a bus accident together.
Mai Takada (高田 舞, Takada Mai)
Voiced by: M.A.O., Yuna Taniguchi (young) (Japanese); Bryn Apprill (English)
A part-time attendant at the bowling alley where Miura and his friends often played. It is revealed that she was childhood friends with Miura.
Chisato Miyazaki (みやざき ちさと, Miyazaki Chisato)
Voiced by: Marie Hatanaka (young) (Japanese); Tia Ballard (young) (English)
A childhood friend of Miura and Mai who moved away. Mai initially claims to be Chisato, when she meets Miura at Quindecim.
Misaki Tachibana (橘みさき, Tachibana Misaki)
Voiced by: Yuriko Yamaguchi (Japanese); Monica Rial (English)
She is the hostess of a reality television show. Misaki's explicit relationship at a young age leads to an unexpected pregnancy with an abusive man. She attempted to raise her five children despite the mishaps of her multiple failed relationships. She was strangled to death by her talent manager in a fit of rage after she slapped and antagonized her.
Yousuke Tateishi (立石 洋介, Tateishi Yousuke)
Voiced by: Masakazu Morita (Japanese); Ian Sinclair (English)
Yousuke's parents had a divorce and his father remarried. However, Yousuke refused to accept his new mother and avoided her at home, eventually committing suicide. He is placed in a Death Game against Misaki where they must fight in an arcade game.
Mayu Arita (有田 マユ, Arita Mayu)
Voiced by: Atsumi Tanezaki (Japanese); Leah Clark (English)
An excitable high school girl who died after slipping on a bar of soap. She is sent to the Viginti where she plays a game of twister against Harada. Unlike the other guests, she ends up staying at the Viginti instead of passing on. Ginti later on presents her with Harada's soul-less body, telling her that it is possible to revive him, but it would require sending another young man's soul into the void in his place. It is not shown what she chooses to do, however she is shown to be bringing Harada's body with her to retrieve his soul. Ginti was originally going to reincarnate her, however changed her to the void after she insisted she lived for Harada and would want to be with him. As they enter the void, Harada manages to be revived for a brief moment before both their souls fall into the void, visually joining as one, reducing their bodies back into the mannequins they originally were.
Harada (原田)
Voiced by: Mamoru Miyano (Japanese); Jessie James Grelle (English)
A male idol who was part of the boy band C.H.A., who plays against Mayu at the Viginti. After causing a fan to commit suicide after breaking up with her, Harada was killed by a timer bomb given to him by his girlfriend, who was that girl's sister. His soul-less body makes a comeback in episode 11, eventually revealing that his soul has been sent to the void. Mayu, believing she was given a choice to revive him, is tricked by Ginti into joining his soul in the void. The two orbs of light representing the two's souls merge into one as they fall into the void, possibly indicating a literal joining of souls.
Shimada (島田)
Voiced by: Takahiro Sakurai (Japanese); Todd Haberkorn (English)
Together with Tatsumi, he arrived at Quindecim, where they both have to fight in a game of air hockey that would decide their fate. Prior to the game, he finds a bloodied knife in his bag with no idea as to why he had it. During the game he recalls that he has a sister named Sae who was violently raped by a stalker and that he was able to kill the stalker with the knife from before, but was mortally wounded during the struggle. He then killed whom he thought to be the stalker's "accomplice", not knowing it was Tatsumi. He later remembers that he died from the loss of blood from the fatal wound he sustained earlier. In the last phases of the game he realizes that the one he thought was the accomplice was actually Tatsumi who went there to kill the stalker as well. He becomes extremely enraged when he learns that Tatsumi, a detective, actually witnessed his sister's assault but did nothing to save her. Despite Chiyuki's attempts to lessen his guilt, he gave in to Tatsumi's taunts. At the end of the game it is suggested that both he and Tatsumi were sent to the void.
Tatsumi (辰巳)
Voiced by: Keiji Fujiwara (Japanese); Kent Williams (English)
He arrived with Shimada at Quindecim, where they have to fight in a game of air hockey. He was a detective whose wife had been brutally murdered. After tracking down and killing the culprit, he began a string of vigilantism where he monitors suspicious people before executing them should they commit a crime, hence he witnessed Sae Shimada's rape and was deduced by her to be an accomplice involved in the assault. Arriving at the stalker's house later, he found the stalker already dead before being fatally stabbed by Shimada, who assumed he was the "accomplice" his sister mentioned. He died of blood loss just as Shimada passed out from his own fatal wound. At the end of the game it is suggested that both he and Shimada were sent to the void.
Sachiko Uemura (上村 幸子, Uemura Sachiko)
Voiced by: Ikuko Tani (Japanese); Linda Leonard (English)
A lone guest who was sent to Quindecim so as to judge hers and the black-haired woman's souls in a game of Old Maid. She was a story book illustrator and the wife of the elderly man from Death Billiards. Chancing upon a card illustrated with a character she never got to draw, she deduced that she was dead, despite not remembering how she died nor does she want to learn it, thankful that she has seen her illustration come to life. Later on as she witnesses cards with illustrations from the Chavvot story, she explains the story and the author's feelings that went into it, which allowed the woman to recall part of her childhood memories and her name, Chiyuki. After the end of the game she is sent to be reincarnated.

== Media ==
=== Death Billiards ===
Death Billiards (デス・ビリヤード, Desu Biriyādo) was produced by Madhouse as part of the Young Animator Training Project's Anime Mirai 2013 project, which funds young animators, alongside other short films by Trigger, Zexcs and Gonzo. Death Billiards and the other shorts each received 38 million yen from the Japanese Animation Creators Association, who receives funding from the Japanese government's Agency for Cultural Affairs. The short was created, directed and written by Yuzuru Tachikawa. The short, along with the other Anime Mirai shorts, opened in 14 Japanese theatres on March 2, 2013.

No.	Title	Original release date
1	"Death Billiards"; Transliteration: "Desu Biriyādo" (Japanese: デス・ビリヤード)	March 2, 2013
Two men – a younger man wearing a suit and an elderly man – find themselves in a bar helmed by a bartender and his female assistant. Their reason for being there is to play a game of billiards, for their lives. As they play, they begin to recall their past lives. The old man is likely to win, so the younger man attacks and kills him and wins the game. At the end, both men realize that they are already dead and each enters an elevator to take them to heaven or hell. They depart, but the bartender refuses to divulge their destinations to his assistant.

=== Death Parade ===
An anime television series based on the short, titled Death Parade, aired in Japan on Nippon TV between January 9 and March 27, 2015. Produced by NTV, VAP and Madhouse, the series is created, written and directed by Yuzuru Tachikawa, with Shinichi Kurita designing the characters and Yuki Hayashi composing the music. The opening theme is "Flyers" by Bradio while the ending theme is "Last Theater" by NoisyCell. The anime is licensed in North America by Funimation, who simulcast the series as it aired. It was also acquired in the United Kingdom by Anime Limited. However, it was later announced that the release was cancelled and delisted. A broadcast dub version began streaming from February 18, 2015, both on Funimation's website and a Dubbletalk programming block which is streamed on Twitch. The series was removed from Crunchyroll in October 2025.

No.	Title	Directed by	Original release date
1	"Death Seven Darts"; Transliteration: "Desu Sebun Dātsu" (Japanese: デス・セブンダーツ)	Jun Shishido	January 9, 2015
Newlyweds Takashi and Machiko find themselves at the Quindecim bar. The bartender, Decim, has them stake their lives in a game of darts, where each dart landed causes their partner pain depending on where it lands. As the game progresses their memories return and Takashi recalls suspecting that Machiko had been having an affair which she denies. He tries to bend the match in his favor, landing the winning hit. At the end of the game, it is revealed they had both died in a car crash because of Takashi's jealousy and Machiko subsequently claims that she only married Takashi for his money. After Decim prevents Takashi from further attacking Machiko, he sends them to the elevators. Takashi is reincarnated and Machiko is sent to the void.
2	"Death Reverse"; Transliteration: "Desu Ribāsu" (Japanese: デス・リバース)	Yōsuke Hatta	January 16, 2015
A black-haired woman with no name or memory is taken by Nona to the Quindecim, where she is assigned to be Decim's assistant. Nona takes the woman backstage to observe the darts game between Machiko and Takashi, explaining the nature behind the games. After the game's conclusion, the woman expresses her thoughts, believing that Machiko only had a one time fling which she regretted and was lying about her baby's father in order to save Takashi's soul. This comes as a surprise to Decim, who is apologetic about being possibly mistaken in his judgement. Later, Nona is seen reading a children's book titled Chavvot in a separate house.
3	"Rolling Ballade"; Transliteration: "Rōringu Barādo" (Japanese: ローリング・バラード)	Kiyoshi Murayama	January 23, 2015
Two new amnesiac teenagers arrive in the Quindecim for another game. This game chosen involves ten pin bowling. The balls contain each other's hearts, which each pulse according to its owner's feelings. As the game goes on the two become friendly and begin to recall portions of their memories. The boy recalls that he is a college student named Shigeru Miura and the girl recalls that she was a girl named Chisato Miyazaki who was once childhood friends with Shigeru before moving away. Shigeru then remembers both he and Chisato died whilst on a bus together, while Chisato also recalls more of the truth about herself. After winning the match, Shigeru asks Chisato for a short date together with what time they have left. They part ways at the elevators, happy to have had a chance to spend time with one another. It is then revealed that Chisato was actually Shigeru's other childhood friend, Mai Takada, who underwent plastic surgery to look like Chisato in order to catch Shigeru's eye. They are both sent to be reincarnated.
4	"Death Arcade"; Transliteration: "Desu Ākēdo" (Japanese: デス・アーケード)	Shinichiro Ushijima	January 30, 2015
A teenager named Yousuke Tateishi and a TV celebrity named Misaki Tachibana arrive in the Quindecim. Misaki is convinced that they are on a hidden camera show and asks Yousuke to behave accordingly. The two participate in an arcade fighting game, playing as fighters based on themselves. Yousuke wins the first round while Misaki experiences a flash of memories of abusive partners. She asks Yousuke to let her win the next round, during which Decim triggers a device causing Yousuke's joystick to malfunction. Misaki wins the second round while Yousuke experiences his own flash of memories about his troubled childhood. They realize that they are not on a TV show and Misaki becomes paranoid that she will be killed if she loses. Misaki uses a special move, but Decim causes her joystick to malfunction, explaining that is necessary to expose a soul's darkness and pass judgement. Desperate to win, Misaki physically attacks Yousuke and knocks him unconscious. Despite Misaki's remorse over her actions, Decim forces her to continue playing the game. Yousuke regains consciousness and fights back with his own special move, with the match ending in a double knockout. Afterwards, they both realise they had died; Yousuke having committed suicide while Misaki was killed by her angered assistant. Decim sends Yousuke to be reincarnated while Misaki is sent to the void.
5	"Death March"; Transliteration: "Desu Māchi" (Japanese: デス・マーチ)	migmi	February 6, 2015
The black-haired assistant has been having a recurring dream about a boy and a girl and is surprised to find the same girl on a panel Nona asked Decim to put behind the bar. Two new guests, a man and a young boy, arrive at the bar. Decim is taken aback when the man recalls having been there before and becomes violent. As Decim restrains the man, both the man and Decim's assistant are put to sleep by the young boy, who is revealed to be another arbiter in disguise named Ginti. Ginti accuses Decim of not judging his assistant even though she is dead. Ginti attacks Decim over his insubordination, but they are stopped by Nona who reveals the guests were part of a test for Decim. She explains that Decim failed to realise the boy had no memories because he was distracted by the man who was a dummy implanted with memories. Later, as the assistant dreams again about the boy and girl, called Jimmy and Chavvot, Nona is seen again reading the book titled Chavvot with the same children on its cover.
6	"Cross Heart Attack"; Transliteration: "Kurosu Hāto Atakku" (Japanese: クロス・ハート・アタック)	Jun Shishido	February 13, 2015
Mayu Arita, an over-excited schoolgirl, and Harada, a member of a popular boy band, arrive at the arbiter bar run by Ginti, who has them play a game of Twister. While Mayu is excited to play with someone from her favorite band, Harada is more concerned with getting back to his girlfriend. When Mayu and Harada demand a break, Ginti changes up the game, causing the climate of the game mat to change with each different panel they step on, from heating to freezing cold. Suddenly, Mayu and Harada are put in a sudden death situation above a pit of spikes. Just as Harada is about to push Mayu off to save himself, Mayu decides to forfeit and lets herself drop. Harada grabs her, feeling guilty over driving one of his ex-girlfriends to suicide. Mayu lets go to save him but she lands safely on rubber spikes instead of dying. Mayu then remembers that she died after slipping on some soap, while Harada recalls he was killed by his girlfriend, in revenge for the suicide of her sister who was his ex-girlfriend. Later, Harada takes an interest in Mayu after she changes into a kimono, and together they perform a concert for the arbiter staff.
7	"Alcohol Poison"; Transliteration: "Arukōru Poizun" (Japanese: アルコール・ポイズン)	Shigatsu Yoshikawa	February 20, 2015
The assistant comes across the Chavvot book containing the same story which occurs in her dreams, causing her to regain some memories and to realize that she is dead. When she asks Decim about the book, he tells her it belongs to Quin, the Quindecim's former arbiter. In a flashback to Decim's training, Nona questions him over why he did not use his remote device to affect the outcome while observing one of Quin's death games. He replied that he respects those who had lived full lives which intrigued Nona. Quin has since become part of the information bureau after quitting her job as arbiter. While drinking with Nona, Quin comments on how Decim is an unusual arbiter with human emotions. Meanwhile, Decim shows his assistant his treasure; a collection of dummies dressed like former guests. He does this so they would not be completely disposed of and forgotten. Later, Nona arranges for two special guests to be sent to Decim.
8	"Death Rally"; Transliteration: "Desu Rarī" (Japanese: デス・ラリー)	Yōsuke Hatta	February 27, 2015
As per Nona's request, Decim is sent two new guests; a young man named Shimada and a detective named Tatsumi, one of whom is allegedly a murderer. While searching for a way out, Shimada finds a blood-stained knife among his belongings, unsure of where it came from. As the two guests participate in a game of air hockey, Shimada gradually regains memories of looking after his younger sister while Tatsumi remembers that his wife was murdered. With the two regaining further memories that fuel their motivations to escape, with Shimada remembering his sister was assaulted, Decim changes up the game, in which scored pucks deal pain to the respective player's organs. Meanwhile, the black-haired woman makes a request to see the memories that Decim received and learns that both Shimada and Tatsumi are murderers.
9	"Death Counter"; Transliteration: "Desu Kauntā" (Japanese: デス・カウンター)	migmi	March 6, 2015
As the game between Shimada and Tatsumi continues, Shimada realises he has already killed someone; the man who assaulted his sister Sae. Tatsumi also remembers that he had killed his wife's murderer and remembers that Shimada was the one who killed him. It appears that Tatsumi had watched Sae be assaulted so that he would have enough evidence to 'pass judgement' on her attacker. On the other hand Shimada, believed that Tatsumi was a passive accomplice in Sae's assault and stabbed him to death. Decim gives Shimada the opportunity to exact punishment on Tatsumi by stabbing the pucks containing Tatsumi's organs, however, his assistant objects and asserts that he can not judge people's souls based on their memories alone. She tries to stop Shimada from punishing Tatsumi but Shimada gives into his anger and kills him. Decim is taken aback by his assistant's arguments as she maintains that people are less complex than he thinks they are. The episode ends by showing the devil atop the elevator, suggesting that both Shimada and Tatsumi were sent to the void.
10	"Story Teller"; Transliteration: "Sutōrī Terā" (Japanese: ストーリー・テラー)	Motohiro Abe	March 13, 2015
Decim begins to questions his ability to judge people following the previous game. Nona reminds him that he still needs to judge his assistant because she will turn into a dummy if she goes without judgement. He decides against having her memories sent to him and Nona sends him a new guest, an old illustrator named Sachiko Uemura. Decim, the assistant and the woman play Old Maid using cards featuring designs based on things which are important to them. Based on images they see, Sachiko deduces she has died while the assistant recalls that her name is Chiyuki after Sachiko tells them about the feelings of the children in the Chavvot story. As Sachiko politely leaves to be reincarnated, Nona's boss Oculus, absorbs the memories of Clavis the elevator attendant, and learns that Decim is displaying human emotions. Meanwhile, Nona has Quin retrieve Chiyuki's memories.
11	"Memento Mori"; Transliteration: "Memento Mori" (Japanese: メメント·モリ)	Jun Shishido	March 20, 2015
Mayu and Harada have not yet been sent on and are still in Ginti's bar. Ginti gives Mayu the opportunity to choose another human soul to be sent into the void in exchange for Harada who is unconscious. Concurrently, Decim asks Chiyuki to perform some ice skating, having noticed it was a large part of her memories. As she skates, Chiyuki regains her memories in which she used to be a professional ice skater until a severe knee injury forced her to retire. This led her to become severely depressed and kill herself. Decim and Chiyuki have a final drink together, but he puts her to sleep and then asks Quin to send him her memories. Meanwhile, Mayu has decided to stay with Harada and share his fate rather than sacrifice another person in his place. Ginti questions her devotion to Harada, and she just says it is her choice. He sends them off in the elevator together, and as they turn into dummies, Harada wakes up enabling them to have a last embrace before entering the void.
12	"Suicide Tour"; Transliteration: "Sūsaido Tsuā" (Japanese: スーサイド·ツアー)	Yuzuru Tachikawa	March 27, 2015
Oculus confronts Nona's methods as she wants to prove that arbiters are more than dummies. Decim shows Chiyuki her old house where she sees that her mother still cares for her, causing her to regret taking her own life. Decim offers Chiyuki a chance to return home in exchange for another's life and she comes close to taking up the offer. However, upon remembering how everyone she met in the Quindecim had people who cherished them, she ultimately decides against it. This causes powerful and painful emotions to swell up in Decim, who reveals to Chiyuki that this was part of her judgement. Nona observes the outcome with Oculus, demonstrating that an important part of being able to judge humans is to understand their suffering. Decim sees Chiyuki off to be reincarnated, vainly attempting to smile. Nona and the others arbiters ponder the implications to their system if arbiters begin understanding human behaviour. Later, Decim welcomes new guests to the Quindecim with a barely perceptible smile, while the bar now contains a mannequin made up to look like Chiyuki.

== Reception ==
Death Parade won the 2016 Anime Trending Awards in the "Best Original Anime" category and was nominated for their "Anime of the Year", "Supernatural Anime of the Year", "Mystery or Psychological Anime of the Year" and "Opening Theme Song of the Year" categories. A poll done on the Japanese video-sharing service Niconico at the end of the Winter 2015 airing anime season ranked Death Parade 9th as the users' favorite anime of that season. The English dubbed version of the anime had nominations for "Best male lead vocal performance in an anime television series/OVA" and "Best female lead vocal performance in an anime television series/OVA" and it won the "Best vocal ensemble in an anime television series/OVA" for the BTVA Anime Dub Television/OVA Voice Acting Awards. IGN listed Death Parade among the best anime series of the 2010s.
