= Bikkuriman =

Japanese anime

ビックリマン
- Genre: Fantasy, Parody
- Created by: Lotte
- Anime television series
- Directed by: Yukio Kaizawa
- Written by: Sukehiro Tomita
- Music by: Takanori Arisawa
- Studio: Toei Animation
- Original network: ANN (ABC, TV Asahi)
- Original run: October 11, 1987 – April 2, 1989
- Episodes: 75
- Anime film

Bikkuriman: Taiichiji Seima Taisen
- Directed by: Hiroyuki Kakudo
- Written by: Sukehiro Tomita
- Studio: Toei Animation
- Released: March 12, 1988
- Runtime: 30 minutes
- Anime film

Bikkuriman: Moen Zone no Himitsu
- Directed by: Junichi Sato
- Written by: Sukehiro Tomita
- Music by: Takanori Arisawa
- Studio: Toei Animation
- Released: July 9, 1988
- Runtime: 45 minutes
- Anime television series

Shin Bikkuriman
- Directed by: Yukio Kaizawa
- Written by: Sukehiro Tomita
- Music by: Shunsuke Kikuchi
- Studio: Toei Animation
- Original network: ANN (ABC, TV Asahi)
- Original run: April 19, 1989 – August 26, 1990
- Episodes: 72
- Anime television series

Super Bikkuriman
- Directed by: Yukio Kaizawa
- Written by: Aya Matsui
- Music by: Takanori Arisawa
- Studio: Toei Animation
- Original network: ANN (ABC, TV Asahi)
- Original run: May 17, 1992 – April 4, 1993
- Episodes: 44
- Anime television series

Bikkuriman 2000
- Directed by: Yusuke Yamamoto
- Written by: Atsuhiro Tomioka
- Studio: Studio Comet, NAS
- Original network: TXN (TV Tokyo)
- Original run: November 1, 1999 – February 26, 2001
- Episodes: 68
- Anime television series

Happy Lucky Bikkuriman
- Directed by: Go Koga
- Produced by: Yasuhiko Nukaga
- Written by: Katsuyuki Sumisawa (eps 1-19); Riku Sanjo (eps 20-46)
- Music by: Yoshichika Inomata; Yoichiro Honda
- Studio: Toei Animation
- Original network: TV Asahi
- Original run: October 15, 2006 – September 30, 2007
- Episodes: 46
- Video game
- Developer: Drecom
- Publisher: Drecom
- Genre: Social card battle
- Platform: Android, GREE, mixi
- Released: April 18, 2011 (GREE, mixi), December 17, 2012 (Android)
- Anime television series

Bikkuri-Men
- Directed by: Tomohiro Yamanashi
- Written by: Yuniko Ayana
- Music by: Yasuhiro Misawa
- Studio: Shin-Ei Animation (production); Lesprit (animation)
- Licensed by: SA / SEA: Medialink
- Original network: Tokyo MX, BS Asahi
- Original run: October 5, 2023 – December 21, 2023
- Episodes: 12
- icon

Bikkuriman (Japanese: ビックリマン; lit. Surprise Man) is a line of wafer snacks produced by Lotte, made notable for the randomly assorted bonus stickers included inside each snack. First released in 1977, Bikkuriman (ビックリマン, lit. "Surprise Man") became wildly popular in Japan with the introduction of the Devil VS Angel Seal (悪魔VS天使シール, Akuma vs Tenshi Shīru) series of stickers, leading to a prolific number of media tie-ins.

== History ==
Bikkuriman is a chocolate and peanut wafer snack made by Lotte that sold for 30 yen at the time of its introduction. Originally, the pack-in stickers were called "Dokkiri Seal" (どっきりシール, lit. "Shocking Seal). Each Seal featured a realistic image on a clear background, with the intention of using them for pranks or gags (broken glass, clothing tears, fake wall switches, etc.) By the 1980s, the Seals began featuring individual gag-based characters with a theme that united a particular set of Seals. These style of stickers would remain for the first 9 sets of Seal releases.

In August 1985, Lotte released the first of the Akuma vs Tenshi Seal series. While maintaining the same humorous art style of the earlier series, the Akuma vs Tenshi Seals featured characters based on assorted mythological, folklore, and even metaphorical sources engaging in an overarching story-line. Akin to the Mars Attacks trading card series from America, the battle between the Tenshi and Akuma is told on the back of each sticker, with the plot progressing with each new set. Each set was divided into several themed tiers featuring a Tenshi, Akuma, and an Omamori (お守り, "Protector"), with an ultra-rare "Head" Seal that serves as the main character of its particular set. The Head Seals were typically printed with a prism or holographic holofoil to set them apart from the Tenshi's metallic silver or gold backing, the clear backgrounds of the Omamori and the multi-colored backgrounds of the Akuma. The rarity of the early Akuma vs Tenshi Seals were, in order: Head, Tenshi, Omamori, Akuma.

Unfortunately, the popularity of the stickers led to trouble for the series. The zeal to try to obtain Head Seals would lead children to buy Bikkuriman in mass quantities, retrieve the stickers inside, and simply throw away the snack. This, along with the fact that children and collectors were willing to pay high amounts of money for the rarer cards, led to parent groups expressing concern of possible gambling implications for the stickers. This led to action by the Japanese Fair Trade Commission, and the number of Head Seals per pack was increased from the average 4 to 24 individual Seals.

== Anime ==
These stickers were a huge success, leading to a multitude of media tie-ins. The original Bikkuriman anime series, created by Toei Animation, aired from October 11, 1987, to April 2, 1989. Sequels include Shin Bikkuriman, Super Bikkuriman, Bikkuriman 2000 and Happy Lucky Bikkuriman.

=== Bikkuri-Men ===
A new anime project featuring original character designs by Hiroyuki Takei was announced on April 1, 2023. The project was later revealed to be a television series produced by Shin-Ei Animation, animated by Lesprit, and directed by Tomohiro Yamanashi, with Yuniko Ayana in charge of series composition, Ayano Owada adapting Takei's original character designs for animation, and Yasuhiro Misawa composing the music. It aired from October 5 to December 21, 2023, on Tokyo MX and BS Asahi. The opening theme song, "Collection", is performed by Dannie May while the ending theme song, "Seishun☆Whatcha Gonna Do", is performed by Daishi Kajita, Shuta Morishima, and Tatsumaru Tachibana. Medialink licensed the series in Asia-Pacific.

==== Characters ====
Yamato
Voiced by: Daishi Kajita
Ushiwaka
Voiced by: Shuta Morishima
Jack
Voiced by: Tatsumaru Tachibana
Phoenix
Voiced by: Soma Saito
Hood
Voiced by: Yōhei Azakami
Peter
Voiced by: Yuki Sakakihara
Maris
Voiced by: Katsuyuki Konishi
Ippontsuri
Voiced by: Yūichirō Umehara
Shokoshi
Voiced by: Mitsuhiro Ichiki
Alibaba
Voiced by: Atsushi Tamaru
Cross
Voiced by: Yui Ogura
Oasis
Voiced by: Yū Kobayashi
Khan
Voiced by: Katsuhisa Hōki
Takayan
Voiced by: Shinnosuke Tokudome
Manseira Type-II
Voiced by: Hiro Shimono
Super Devil
Voiced by: Junichi Suwabe

== Manga ==
- Super Bikkuriman, a series published by Shōgakukan
