= Tanuki to Kitsune =

Japanese manga series

- First tankōbon volume cover

タヌキとキツネ
- Genre: Fantasy
- Manga
- Written by: Atamoto
- Published by: Frontier Works
- Imprint: Reluct Comics
- Original run: November 15, 2016 – present
- Volumes: 10
- Original net animation
- Directed by: Tomohiro Tsukimisato
- Music by: Koguma
- Studio: Lesprit; Gathering (production cooperation)
- Released: February 9, 2018 – May 15, 2018
- Episodes: 18 + 2 OVAs
- Anime television series
- Directed by: Tommy Hino
- Written by: Rika Kihara
- Studio: Akatsuki Media Studio
- Original network: TXN (TV Tokyo)
- Original run: October 4, 2026 – present
- Episodes: 1

Tanuki to Kitsune (タヌキとキツネ; lit. 'Raccoon Dog and Fox') is a Japanese manga series written and illustrated by Atamoto. Originally serialized as a web manga on Twitter since 2016, it was later acquired by Frontier Works, who then began publishing the series in print under its Reluct Comics imprint in November 2016. Ten tankōbon volumes have been released as of October 2024. An original net animation (ONA) adaptation produced by Lesprit was released on YouTube from February to May 2018. An anime television series adaptation produced by Akatsuki Media Studio premiered in October 2026.

== Characters ==
Racoon Dog (タヌキ, Tanuki)
Voiced by: Misaki Kuno
Fox (キツネ, Kitsune)
Voiced by: Nao Tōyama
Wolf (オオカミ, Ōkami)
Voiced by: Toshiyuki Morikawa
Bear (クマ, Kuma)
Voiced by: Takuma Nagatsuka
Rabbit (ウサギ, Usagi)
Voiced by: Maria Naganawa
Rabbit (ウサギ, Usagi)
Voiced by: Takuma Nagatsuka
Bird (トリ, Tori)
Stoat (オコジョ, Okojo)

== Media ==
=== Manga ===
No.	Japanese release date	Japanese ISBN
1	November 15, 2016	978-4-86134-929-4
2	May 15, 2017	978-4-86657-000-6
3	November 15, 2017	978-4-86657-058-7
4	May 15, 2018	978-4-86657-086-0; 978-4-86657-087-7 (SE)
5	November 15, 2018	978-4-86657-191-1
6	May 15, 2019	978-4-86657-250-5
7	December 15, 2021	978-4-86657-495-0
8	August 9, 2022	978-4-86657-575-9
9	April 14, 2023	978-4-86657-659-6
10	October 15, 2024	978-4-86657-812-5

=== Anime ===
An original net animation (ONA) adaptation was announced on December 21, 2017. The series is animated by Lesprit with cooperation by Gathering and directed by Tomohiro Tsukimisato, with Koguma composing the music. It was released on YouTube from February 9 to May 15, 2018.

An anime television series adaptation was announced on March 27, 2026. The series will be produced by Akatsuki Media Studio and Tommy Hino, with Rika Kihara writing the scripts. It premiered on October 4, 2026, within the Animori! program on TV Tokyo and its affiliates.

== Reception ==
By October 2024, the series has over 1.3 million copies in circulation.
