= Association of Japanese Animations =

Japanese animation studio association

The Association of Japanese Animations
- 一般社団法人日本動画協会
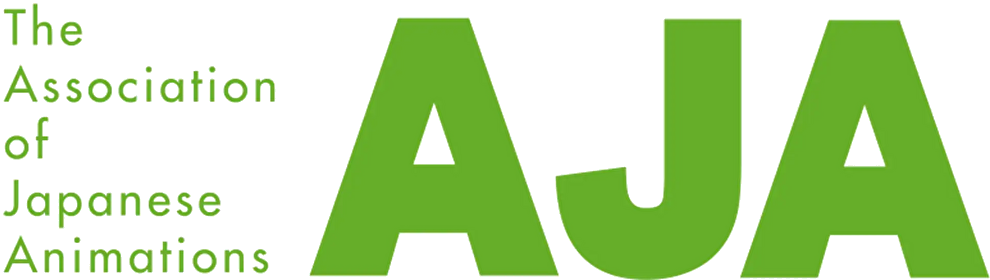
- Formation: May 2002
- Type: Anime trade association
- Legal status: Organization
- Purpose: Sustainable development of the animation industry
- Headquarters: 4F, 3-4-5, Hongo, Bunkyo, Tokyo
- Coordinates: 35°42′13.2″N 139°45′47.5″E
- Region served: Japan
- Services: Domestic / international exchange, copyright protection
- Members: 38 regular member companies, 44 associate member companies (as of June 2020)
- Official language: Japanese
- Key people: Kazuko Ishikawa (Chairman)
- Website: aja.gr.jp

The Association of Japanese Animations (AJA; 日本動画協会, Nippon Douga Kyoukai) is an industry group consisting of 52 affiliate animation production companies.

== AJA's duties ==
AJA's scope of duties is to address various issues concerning the Japanese animation industry, of which most members are a part of.

Most of AJA's members are small to medium-sized companies, hence the need for AJA to unite together to overcome some of the larger problems. These include intellectual property infringement, rampant piracy and the rise of illegal file sharing following the introduction and widespread adoption of P2P networking software.

Besides the aforementioned, AJA also serves to resolve conflicts, and provide improvements of the general production environment, talents and oversea operations.

AJA also releases annual reports on the anime industry. According to the 2017 report, overseas markets expanded 1.5 times the previous year to a record high. In terms of contracts, China placed first while the United States dropped to 4th place. In 2019, the United States placed first as Canada placed second in contracts.

== Events ==
AJA also organises events to promote the work of their members to the major distributor of licenses of other regions, R1 (US), R3 (SEA), R2 (UK), R4 (Aus) and so on, in bid to promote Japanese animation to the world.

One of their events is the biggest anime related event in Japan, the Tokyo International Anime Fair.

Since April 2014, the AJA took leadership of Young Animator Training Project (若手アニメーター育成プロジェクト, Wakate Animētā Ikusei Purojekuto) an annual project first launched in 2010 by the Japanese Animation Creators Association and funded by the Japanese government's Agency for Cultural Affairs in order to support training animators. The project features a series of animated shorts produced by various animation studios each year. In 2012 it was renamed Anime Mirai (アニメミライ) and again in 2016 to Anime Tamago (あにめたまご, lit. "Anime Egg").

== See also ==
- Japanese Animation Creators Association
