= Yes, No, or Maybe? =

Japanese light novel series

- First light novel volume cover

イエスかノーか半分か (Iesu ka Nō ka Hanbun ka)
- Genre: Yaoi
- Light novel
- Written by: Michi Ichiho
- Illustrated by: Lala Takemiya
- Published by: Shinshokan
- English publisher: NA: Seven Seas Entertainment
- Imprint: Dear+ Bunko
- Magazine: Shōsetsu Dear+
- Original run: November 8, 2014 – present
- Volumes: 3 + 6 spin-offs
- Anime film
- Directed by: Masahiro Takata
- Produced by: Tomoyuki Morikawa
- Music by: Tomoki Hasegawa
- Studio: Lesprit
- Licensed by: Crunchyroll
- Released: December 11, 2020
- Runtime: 53 minutes

Yes, No, or Maybe? (イエスかノーか半分か, Iesu ka Nō ka Hanbun ka) is a Japanese yaoi light novel series written by Michi Ichiho and illustrated by Lala Takemiya. The stories are serialized in the quarterly magazine Shōsetsu Dear+ since 2013. Shinshokan have published three volumes, three side stories, and two spin-off volumes since November 2014 under their Dear+ Bunko imprint. Seven Seas Entertainment has licensed the series in English for North American release. An anime film adaptation by Lesprit premiered on December 11, 2020. Seven Seas Entertainment also released a manga adaptation beginning in October 2024.

== Plot ==
Kei Kunieda, a popular TV host, is known for his professional behavior, but he's the polar opposite in private. One day, Ushio Tsuzuki, an animator, discovers his off-camera personality when they run into each other at the grocery store, where a bicycle accident causes Ushio to injure his wrist. Kei is forced to help Ushio while he recovers, and in an attempt to prevent Ushio from discovering his secret, Kei gives his name as "Owari." Ushio, however, comes to love him for who he truly is, and Kei struggles with his own feelings as well as hiding the truth from him.

== Characters ==
Kei Kunieda (国江田計, Kunieda Kei)
Voiced by: Atsushi Abe
Ushio Tsuzuki (都築潮, Tsuzuki Ushio)
Voiced by: Yoshihisa Kawahara

== Media ==
=== Light novels ===
==== Main series ====
No.	Title	Original release date	English release date
1	Yes, No, or Maybe? Iesu ka Nō ka Hanbun ka (イエスかノーか半分か)	November 8, 2014; 978-4-40352-364-9	October 6, 2020; 978-1-64505-866-3
2	Sekai no Mannaka: Iesu ka Nō ka Hanbun ka (世界のまんなか～イエスかノーか半分か～)	June 10, 2015; 978-4-403-52377-9	March 12, 2024; 978-1-63858-596-1
3	O-uchi no Arika: Iesu ka Nō ka Hanbun ka (おうちのありか ~イエスかノーか半分か~)	June 30, 2016; 978-4-403-52402-8	June 4, 2024; 978-1-63858-822-1

==== Side stories ====
No.	Title	Original release date	English release date
1	Yokogao to Niji: Iesu ka Nō ka Hanbun ka Bangai-hen (横顔と虹彩 ~イエスかノーか半分か 番外篇~)	February 10, 2017; 978-4403524165	TBA
2	Koigateki to Niji: Iesu ka Nō ka Hanbun ka Bangai-hen (恋敵と虹彩~イエスかノーか半分か番外篇~)	August 10, 2018; 978-4403524578	TBA
3	Fusai de: Iesu ka Nō ka Hanbun ka Bangai-hen (ふさいで~イエスかノーか半分か番外篇~)	December 12, 2018; 978-4403524714	TBA

==== Spin-offs ====
No.	Title	Original release date	English release date
1	Off Air: Iesu ka Nō ka Hanbun ka (OFF AIR~イエスかノーか半分か~)	August 29, 2017; 978-4-403-22115-6	TBA
2	Off Air	October 31, 2019; 978-4-403-22129-3	TBA

=== Anime film ===
An anime adaptation was announced on October 31, 2019, later revealed in 2020 to be a film. It is animated by Lesprit, with Masahiro Takata directing, Toshiyuki Morikawa as producer, Ayano Ōwada designing the characters, and Tomoki Hasegawa composing the music. The film premiered in Japanese theaters on December 11, 2020, as part of the BL Fes!! project's first event screenings. Atsushi Abe and Yoshihisa Kawahara performed the film's theme song "Sekai to Kakurenbo" as their respective characters. On March 10, 2021, Crunchyroll announced they had acquired streaming rights for the film outside of Asia and German-speaking Europe, releasing it on the same day.

== Reception ==
The light novel series ranked first in 2016, 2018, and 2019 and second in 2017 in Next Books's annual light novel guide book Kono BL ga Yabai!, in the novel category. The series also ranked third in the Yomiuri Shimbun's Sugoi Japan Award in 2017, in the light novel category.
