= Lesprit =

Japanese animation studio

Lesprit Co., Ltd.
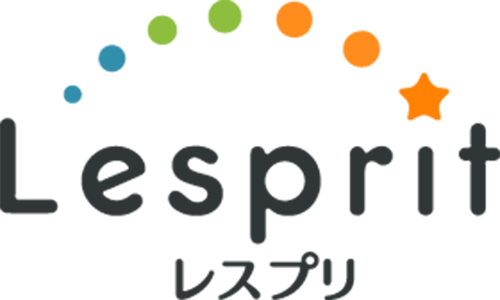
- Native name: 株式会社レスプリ
- Romanized name: Kabushiki gaisha Resupuri
- Type: Kabushiki gaisha
- Industry: Animation studio
- Founded: December 2016; 9 years ago
- Headquarters: Nakano, Nakano, Tokyo, Japan
- Key people: Shimizu Kanako
- Total equity: ¥ 10,000,000
- Owner: Gathering Holdings
- Number of employees: 8
- Website: lesprit.jp

Lesprit Co., Ltd. (Japanese: 株式会社レスプリ, Hepburn: Kabushiki gaisha Resupuri) is a Japanese animation studio based in Nakano, Tokyo.

== Works ==
=== Television series ===
Title	Director(s)	First run start date	First run end date	Eps	Note(s)	Ref(s)
How Clumsy you are, Miss Ueno	Tomohiro Tsukimisato	January 6, 2019	March 24, 2019	12	Based on a manga written by tugeneko.	
Anime Kapibara-san	Tomohiro Tsukimisato	October 9, 2020	March 26, 2021	24	Based on a character by Bandai Spirits. Co-produced with Shin-Ei Animation.	
YouTuNya	Kyō Yatate	April 4, 2023	June 18, 2024	27	Original work.	
Bikkuri-Men	Tomohiro Tsukimisato	October 5, 2023	December 21, 2023	12	Based on the Bikkuriman stickers by Lotte Confectionery. Co-produced with Shin-Ei Animation.	
Koupen-chan	Kyō Yatate	April 6, 2025	TBA	TBA	Based on the character and the illustrations by Rurutea.	
With You and the Rain	Tomohiro Tsukimisato	July 6, 2025	September 21, 2025	12	Based on a manga written by Ko Nikaido.	
Sirotan	Arisa Okada	October 3, 2026	TBA	TBA	Based on a character by Creative Yoko.	

=== Original net animations ===
Title	Director(s)	First run start date	First run end date	Eps	Note(s)	Ref(s)
Tanuki to Kitsune	Tomohiro Tsukimisato	February 9, 2018	May 15, 2018	20	Based on a webcomic written by Atamoto.	

=== Films ===
Title	Director(s)	Release Date	Note(s)	Ref(s)
Yes, No, or Maybe?	Masahiro Takata	December 11, 2020	Based on a light novel written by Michi Ichiho.	
Kirakira Kirari	Tomohiro Tsukimisato	2022	Original work. Part of the 2022 Anime no Tane project.	
