= Arata-naru Sekai =

Japanese media franchise

アラタなるセカイ
- Manga
- Written by: Hitoma Iruma
- Illustrated by: Kendi Oiwa
- Published: 20 October 2012
- Novel
- Written by: Hitoma Iruma
- Illustrated by: Kurehito Misaki
- Published: 20 October 2012
- Original video animation
- Directed by: Yuzuru Tachikawa
- Produced by: Shinichiro Kashiwada
- Written by: Hitoma Iruma
- Music by: Naoki "naotyu" Chiba
- Studio: Madhouse
- Released: 20 October 2012

Arata-naru Sekai (アラタなるセカイ; "Renewing World") is a Japanese manga, anime and novel box set. It is a collaboration between Aniplex, ASCII Media Works and Kadokawa Shoten, with animation production by Madhouse.

== Characters ==
- Yakusa Voiced by: Risa Taneda
- Hoshigaoka Voiced by: Yuka Iguchi
- Hongō Voiced by: Rumi Ōkubo
- Ichimiya Voiced by: Yumi Uchiyama
- Arata Voiced by: Yoriko Nagata
- Kirishima Voiced by: Ryōhei Kimura
- Sakyōyama Voiced by: Junichi Yanagita
- Ikeshita Voiced by: Kaito Ishikawa
- Chikusa Voiced by: Mikako Komatsu
