= Sirotan =

Japanese merchandise character

- Creative Yoko character
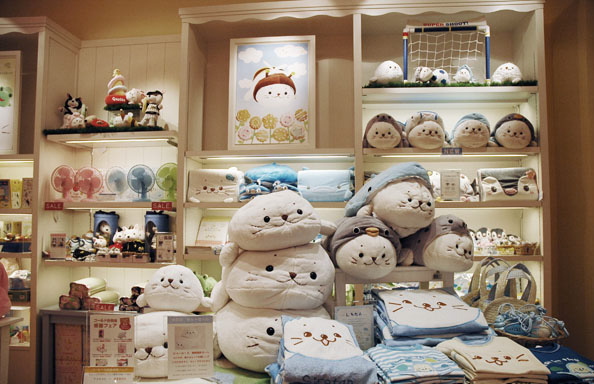
- First appearance: August 8, 1999
- Created by: Creative Yoko; designed by Ema Yamada

In-universe information
- Species: Harp seal (whitecoat)
- Gender: Male
- Occupation: Mascot / plush toy line
- Nationality: Japanese

Sirotan is a Japanese merchandise character that was created on August 8, 1999, by Creative Yoko.

== Merchandise ==
Sirotan is a young harp seal, white in colour but is often disguised as other cute animals and objects. He was made on August 8, 1999, in Northern Iceland. Sirotan's favourite things to do are napping and swimming in the ocean. His favourite foods are fish, ice-cream, confectionery and milk. He loves dressing up and playing. "Sirotan" literally means, "Widdle White", which is the childish version of "Little White."

== History ==
- Sirotan

しろたん
- Anime television series
- Directed by: Arisa Okada
- Written by: Sei Yoshitsuki
- Music by: Shōta Kowashi
- Studio: Lesprit (animation); Shin-Ei Animation (production and planning)
- Original network: TV Asahi
- Original run: October 3, 2026 – present
- Episodes: 1

In 2019, the date "August 8" was officially registered by the Japan Anniversary Association as "Sirotan Day," which has then since been marked with fan events and product launches.

The first theme shop dedicated to Sirotan opened in 2016 and was found at Haneda Airport but is now closed, however since 2016 many physical stores have been opened and can be found in Tokyo, Kyoto prefecture, Kanagawa prefecture, Tochigi prefecture, Saitama prefecture, Niigata prefecture, Aichi prefecture, Osaka prefecture, Yamaguchi prefecture and Saga prefecture.

An anime television series based on the character was announced in March 2026. Produced by Lesprit and directed by Arisa Okada, the series premiered on October 3, 2026 on TV Asahi's new PicoAni short anime programming block.
