= How Clumsy you are, Miss Ueno =

Japanese manga series

- First tankōbon volume cover, featuring Ueno

上野さんは不器用 (Ueno-san wa Bukiyō)
- Genre: Romantic comedy
- Manga
- Written by: Tugeneko
- Published by: Hakusensha
- Magazine: Young Animal
- Original run: February 27, 2015 – March 24, 2022
- Volumes: 10
- Anime television series
- Directed by: Tomohiro Yamanashi
- Written by: Tomohiro Yamanashi
- Music by: Yasuhiro Misawa
- Studio: Lesprit
- Licensed by: Sentai Filmworks
- Original network: BS11, Tokyo MX
- Original run: January 6, 2019 – March 24, 2019
- Episodes: 12
- icon

How Clumsy you are, Miss Ueno (Japanese: 上野さんは不器用, Hepburn: Ueno-san wa Bukiyō; lit. "Miss Ueno is clumsy") is a Japanese manga series written and illustrated by Tugeneko. It was serialized in Hakusensha's seinen manga magazine Young Animal from February 2015 to March 2022, with its chapters collected in ten tankōbon volumes. A 12-episode anime television series adaptation by Lesprit aired from January to March 2019.

== Synopsis ==
The series follows Ueno, a strong-willed, smart girl who attends middle school and is the president of the science club, where she has built various technical gadgets. However, as soon as she starts thinking about love, she goes crazy and does not know how to help herself.

== Characters ==
Ueno (上野)
Voiced by: Yū Serizawa (Japanese); Hilary Haag (English)
Tanaka (田中)
Voiced by: Aimi Tanaka (Japanese); Nathan Wilson (English)
Yamashita (山下)
Voiced by: Akari Kageyama (Japanese); Monica Rial (English)
Mizuna Tanaka (田中みずな, Tanaka Mizuna)
Voiced by: Nichika Ōmori (Japanese); Patty Cakes (English)
Yomogi Tanaka (田中よもぎ, Tanaka Yomogi)
Voiced by: Miku Itō (Japanese); Christina Kelly (English)
Tamon (タモン)
Voiced by: Shiori Izawa (Japanese); Holly Segarra (English)
Kitanaga (北長)
Voiced by: Haruka Tomatsu (Japanese); Melissa Molano (English)
Nishihara (西原)
Voiced by: Rina Satō (Japanese); Kira Vincent-Davis (English)
Minamine (南峰)
Voiced by: Ayana Taketatsu (Japanese); Joslyn Johnson (English)
Unogawa (東川)
Voiced by: Yuka Iguchi (Japanese); Scarlette Skipper (English)

== Media ==
=== Manga ===
Written and illustrated by Tugeneko, How Clumsy you are, Miss Ueno was serialized in Hakusensha's seinen manga magazine Young Animal from February 27, 2015, to March 24, 2022. Hakusensha collected its chapters in ten tankōbon volumes, released from September 29, 2016, to May 27, 2022.

==== Volumes ====
No.	Japanese release date	Japanese ISBN
1	September 29, 2016	978-4-592-14698-8
2	April 28, 2017	978-4-592-14699-5
3	October 27, 2017	978-4-592-14818-0
4	May 29, 2018	978-4-592-14819-7
5	December 26, 2018	978-4-592-14820-3
6	March 29, 2019	978-4-592-14820-3
7	March 27, 2020	978-4-592-16051-9
8	July 29, 2020	978-4-592-16052-6
9	May 27, 2022	978-4-592-16053-3
10	May 27, 2022	978-4-592-16054-0

=== Anime ===
An anime television series adaptation was announced in May 2018. The series was directed and written by Tomohiro Yamanashi, with animation by studio Lesprit. Ayano Ōwada provided the character designs, while Nobuyuki Abe was the sound director. Yasuhiro Misawa composed the series' music at Nippon Columbia, and Gathering was credited with cooperation. The series aired from January 6 to March 24, 2019, and was broadcast on BS11, Tokyo MX, and J:COM TV. Miku Itō performed the series' opening theme song "Hirameki Heartbeat" (閃きハートビート), while Yū Serizawa, Aimi Tanaka, and Akari Kageyama performed the series' ending theme song "My Pace Science" (マイペース・サイエンス). The series is licensed by Sentai Filmworks in North America, Australasia, and the British Isles, and simulcast the series on Hidive. The English dub was released on July 6, 2019.

==== Episodes ====
No.	Title (Note: All English titles are taken from Hidive.)	Original release date
1	"Rocker-Kun"; Transliteration: "Rokka-Kun" (Japanese: ロッカくん)	January 6, 2019
1	"Kumatander No. 2"; Transliteration: "Kumatandā 2-gō" (Japanese: クマタンダー2号)	January 6, 2019
2	"Dass-Tan"; Transliteration: "Dasshu-tan" (Japanese: ダッシュたん)	January 13, 2019
2	"1-7-6 Protective Gear"; Transliteration: "Ichi nana roku bōgo fuku" (Japanese: 一七六防護服)	January 13, 2019
3	"The Kilt Hide"; Transliteration: "Kiruto haido" (Japanese: キルトハイド)	January 20, 2019
3	"Garakutan"; Transliteration: "Garaku-tan" (Japanese: ガラクたん)	January 20, 2019
4	"Ueno No. 13"; Transliteration: "Ueno ichi san-gō" (Japanese: ウエノ13号)	January 27, 2019
4	"The SummonStat"; Transliteration: "Samonsutatto" (Japanese: サモンスタット)	January 27, 2019
5	"The P-Specter"; Transliteration: "Pīsupekutā" (Japanese: ピースペクター)	February 3, 2019
5	"The PE Reserver"; Transliteration: "PE rizābā" (Japanese: PEリザーバー)	February 3, 2019
6	"II Umbrella"; Transliteration: "II Kasa" (Japanese: II傘)	February 10, 2019
6	"E-Q Booster"; Transliteration: "E-Q Būsutā" (Japanese: E-Qブースター)	February 10, 2019
7	"Panty Roti"; Transliteration: "Pantirotti" (Japanese: パンティロッティ)	February 17, 2019
7	"The Gacha-Porter"; Transliteration: "Gacha pōtā" (Japanese: ガチャポーター)	February 17, 2019
8	"Coittsu Nate Luna D"; Transliteration: "Koitsunētoruna D jō" (Japanese: コイツネートルナD錠)	February 24, 2019
8	"Pero-Lilion"; Transliteration: "Peroririon" (Japanese: ペロリリオン)	February 24, 2019
9	"Jigatights"; Transliteration: "Jigo supattsu" (Japanese: ジゴスパッツ)	March 3, 2019
9	"SQ-Water"; Transliteration: "SQ-mizu" (Japanese: SQ水)	March 3, 2019
10	"Kanchikan"; Transliteration: "Kanchikan" (Japanese: カンチカン)	March 10, 2019
10	"Repara-te"; Transliteration: "Reparā te" (Japanese: レパラー手)	March 10, 2019
11	"Invisi-Bloomer"; Transliteration: "Inbijiburuma" (Japanese: インビジブルマ)	March 17, 2019
11	"The Rear Skirt"; Transliteration: "Riasu kōto" (Japanese: リアスコート)	March 17, 2019
12	"Gan-Q"; Transliteration: "Gan kyū" (Japanese: 眼キュー)	March 24, 2019
12	"Ballet-Tan"; Transliteration: "Barettan" (Japanese: バレッタン)	March 24, 2019

== Reception ==
Gadget Tsūshin listed "You tried to touch my titties!" (a phrase from the third episode) in their 2019 anime buzzwords list.
