= Imagica =

Japanese post-production company

IMAGICA Lab. Inc.
- Company type: Public KK
- Industry: Motion picture Communications
- Founded: 1935; 91 years ago
- Headquarters: Tokyo, Japan
- Products: Post production
- Total assets: ¥6,536 million JPY (Till from 31 March 2018)
- Owner: Imagica Group
- Number of employees: 450
- Subsidiaries: OLM, Inc.; Robot Communications; P.I.C.S
- Website: www.imagicalab.co.jp

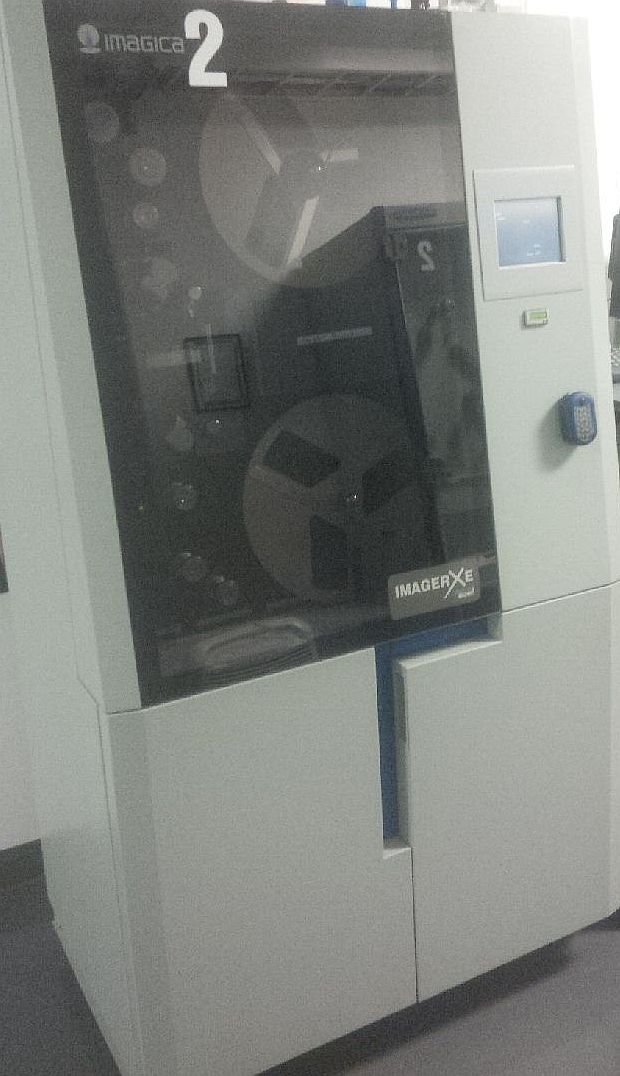
Imagica film scanner

IMAGICA Lab. Inc. (株式会社IMAGICA Lab., Kabushiki-gaisha Imajika Lab.) is a Japanese post-production company for films, television programmes and commercials, etc., established in 1935 and headquartered in Shinagawa, Tokyo, Japan. It is a subsidiary of Imagica Group.

== History ==
Imagica was formerly named Far East Laboratory (極東現像所, Kyokutō Genzōsho) from 1935 to 1942, and Toyo Laboratory (東洋現像所, Tōyō Genzōsho) from 1942 to 1986, and changed to its current name in 1986. Imagica started theatrical film developing business.

On 1 April 2004, Imagica and Robot Communications co-established Imagica Robot Holdings Inc., and Imagica became a part of this company.
