= Japanese Animation Creators Association =

JAniCA
- Japanese Animation Creators Association
- 日本アニメーター・演出協会
- Founded: June 2007
- Headquarters: 4-4-9 Sotokanda, Chiyoda-ku, Tokyo, Matsui Building 4th floor
- Members: 1142 (February 2011)
- Key people: Yasuhiro Irie (2016-present); Toyoo Ashida, Osamu Yamasaki, Satoshi Kon (formerly), Rintaro, Koji Morimoto
- Website: http://www.janica.jp/

The Japanese Animation Creators Association (日本アニメーター・演出協会, Nippon Animētā Enshutsu Kyōkai) or JAniCA, is a non-profit organization dedicated to improving working conditions for workers in the anime industry. The group was formed in June 2007.

== History ==
On October 15, 2007, over 500 animators gathered together to announce the formation of JAniCA under its president Toyoo Ashida. Among the other creators who spoke at the October 13 press conference were director Satoshi Kon, animation director Moriyasu Taniguchi, Tokyo University graduate school professor Yasuki Hamano, editor Nobuyuki Takahashi and animation director Akihiro Kanayama.

In June 2008 JAniCA was legally incorporated as an Unlimited liability company intermediary corporation to further continue improving the work conditions in the Japanese animation industry.

In 2010 JAniCA launched their "Young Animator Training Project" (若手アニメーター育成プロジェクト, Wakate Animētā Ikusei Purojekuto). The group received 214.5 million yen (about US$2.27 million) from the Japanese government's Agency for Cultural Affairs, and it distributed most of those funds to studios to train young animators on-the-job during the year. One of the reasons for the support of the Agency for Cultural Affairs is the concern that more of the Japanese animation process is being outsourced overseas—thus leading to a decline in opportunities to teach animation techniques within Japan. In 2011 the Agency once again provided funding for JAniCA to select more young training projects under the same budgets. In 2012, this project was renamed "Anime Mirai" (アニメミライ; lit. Animation Future). It has been run by The Association of Japanese Animation since 2014, and was renamed Anime Tamago (あにめたまご; lit. 'Anime Egg') in 2016.

== See also ==
- The Association of Japanese Animations
