= High School DxD season 1 =

High School DxD
- Season 1
- No. of episodes: 12 + 2 OVAs + 6 specials

Release
- Original network: AT-X
- Original release: January 6 – March 23, 2012

Season chronology
- Next → High School DxD New

High School DxD is an anime series adapted from the light novels of the same title written by Ichiei Ishibumi and illustrated by Miyama-Zero. Produced by TNK, directed by Tetsuya Yanagisawa, and written by Takao Yoshioka, the anime aired on TV Tokyo's satellite channel AT-X from January 6 to March 23, 2012. Set during the struggle among the devils, fallen angels, and angels, the story follows the adventures of Issei Hyodo. Issei is a perverted high school student who is nearly killed by his first date, who is revealed to be a fallen angel. He is revived by Rias Gremory, who is a crimson-haired school beauty that is actually a devil, and becomes her servant. The first season adapts material from the first two volumes of the light novels and a few side stories from Volume 8.

Six DVD and Blu-ray compilation volumes of the first season were released by Media Factory between March 21, 2012, and August 29, 2012. Each contained an OVA short entitled "Release the Swaying Delusions" (妄想爆揺解除オリジナルビデオ, Mōsō Bakuyure Kaijo Orijinaru Bideo; lit. 'Release the Swaying Delusions Original Video') and other bonus material. An OVA episode that is listed as episode 13 was released with the limited edition of the 13th light novel volume on September 6, 2012, on Blu-ray. The script was handled by Ichiei Ishibumi, who is the author of the light novels. Another OVA episode that is listed as episode 14 is written by Ishibumi and was bundled with the limited edition release of the 15th light novel volume on May 31, 2013, on Blu-ray.

In North America, the anime series is licensed by Funimation for simulcast on their website and home video releases on DVD and Blu-ray. In Australia, the series is licensed by Madman Entertainment, but it was not released in New Zealand after the Office of Film and Literature Classification (OFLC) decided against releasing it because "it encourages and legitimizes the pursuit of young persons as viable adult sexual partners". Funimation released the first season on August 20, 2013.

The original score for the series was composed by Ryosuke Nakanishi. The opening theme for the first season is titled "Trip -Innocent of D-" and performed by J-pop group Larval Stage Planning. The ending theme is titled "STUDYxSTUDY" and performed by the voice actress unit StylipS, which consists of Arisa Noto, Yui Ogura, Kaori Ishihara, and Maho Matsunaga.

== Episodes ==
No. overall	No. in season	Title	Directed by	Written by	Original release date
1	1	"I Got a Girlfriend!"; Transliteration: "Kanojo, Dekimashita!" (Japanese: 彼女、できました!)	Taro Kubo	Takao Yoshioka	January 6, 2012
Issei Hyodo is a high school student who is unpopular with girls at Kuoh Academy. One day, Rias Gremory, the crimson-red haired top idol of the academy and president of the Occult Research Club, discovers Issei and asks her vice-president Akeno Himejima about his identity. As Issei dreams of having a girlfriend, another girl named Yuuma Amano shyly asks Issei out, to his excitement. At the end of their first date, Yuma asks Issei to die for her sake and reveals herself as Raynare, a fallen angel. After Raynare kills Issei, he sees a vision of Rias. Assuming the incident to be a dream, he resumes his normal life. However, when Issei encounters another fallen angel, Dohnaseek, he is wounded. Just as Dohnaseek is about to finish off Issei, Rias intervenes and saves him. The next morning, Issei discovers he and Rias are naked together in his bedroom. Reassuring Issei that the dreams were real, Rias introduces herself as a devil and his new master.
2	2	"I Quit Being Human!"; Transliteration: "Ningen, Yamemashita!" (Japanese: 人間、やめました!)	Kazuhide Kondo	Takao Yoshioka	January 13, 2012
Rias explains to Issei that she used her magic to heal his wounds as she gets ready for school, and also reveals that she is a virgin. At Kuoh Academy, the school prince Yuto Kiba leads Issei to the Occult Research Club where he meets the popular "mascot" girl Koneko Toujou and the club's vice-president Akeno Himejima. Rias briefs Issei on the current situation with angels, fallen angels, and devils; and the duties assigned to him. After going to his first assignment which involves an otaku, he encounters another fallen angel named Kalawarner, but uses his Sacred Gear to transform his hand into an armored Dragon Arm and defeats her. Shortly afterwards, Rias warns Issei that since he has revealed the Sacred Gear, he will be sought after by the fallen angels.
3	3	"I Got a Friend!"; Transliteration: "Tomodachi, Dekimashita!" (Japanese: 友達、できました!)	Kosuke Kobayashi	Takao Yoshioka	January 20, 2012
Issei befriends a teenage nun Asia Argento but hides his devil identity from her. After Rias warns Issei about the dangers of the Church, the team must battle a stray devil. Rias briefs Issei on the Evil Pieces system where each member of her team has a certain role similar to chess pieces, where Rias is the king, but Issei is the pawn. Issei's next assignment becomes difficult when he must deal with a ruthless exorcist Freed Sellzen. However, Asia, working for Freed, witnesses the incident and attempts to stop Freed from killing Issei. Rias and the other members rescue Issei but leave Asia behind, to his dismay.
4	4	"I'm Saving My Friend!"; Transliteration: "Tomodachi, Sukuimasu!" (Japanese: 友達、救います!)	Masayuki Iimura	Takao Yoshioka	January 27, 2012
While on a date with Asia, Issei finds out her past as an excommunicated nun from the Church. Issei vows to be her friend regardless of being a devil, but they are interrupted by Raynare, who captures Asia. Later, Rias explains a special ability that pawns have: Promotion. She suddenly leaves with Akeno, leaving an ambiguous note about the Church as enemy grounds. Issei remembers Raynare's speech about a ritual with Asia tonight and is determined to rescue her. As Issei heads for the Church, Kiba and Koneko follow him having understood Rias's message. They storm into the sanctuary and defeat Freed; however, Issei finds Asia chained to a cross where Raynare is about to complete her ritual.
5	5	"I Will Defeat My Ex-girlfriend!"; Transliteration: "Motokano, Taoshimasu!" (Japanese: 元カノ、倒します!)	Tetsuya Yanagisawa	Takao Yoshioka	February 3, 2012
Raynare removes Asia's sacred gear and puts it into herself, killing Asia. She even releases Asia to Issei but mentions the price a host pays if their Sacred Gear is removed or destroyed. She is surprised that her superiors were wary of his Sacred Gear as its ability is only able to double the power of its user, especially when Issei is so weak that he is not a threat even with his power doubled. Issei furiously prays to God and Lucifer before the extreme intensity of his emotions unlocks an ability in his Sacred Gear revealing just part of its full potential. In a state of righteous manic rage, he is able to use his newfound power to knock out Raynare in a single devastating punch even after she had impaled both of his legs. Rias appears and admonishes Raynare for both underestimating Issei's Sacred Gear and for injuring one of her servants. In a desperate attempt to manipulate him into trusting her again, Raynare changes into her human Yuuma form and pleads for him to protect her. Angered by Raynare's behavior and with his heart breaking, Issei orders Rias to kill Raynare. Shortly afterwards, Rias recovers Asia's Sacred Gear and revives her as a bishop.
6	6	"I Work as a Devil!"; Transliteration: "Akuma, Yattemasu!" (Japanese: アクマ、やってます!)	Akira Shimizu	Takao Yoshioka	February 10, 2012
After Raynare's demise, new living arrangements are made for Asia, who has been living in the club's room. Meanwhile, Issei begins a new training regimen with Rias to improve his physical fitness. During training, Issei is surprised to find Asia and her boxes outside his house. Asia also begins attending school where she is placed in Issei's class. She quickly attracts other classmates including jealousy from Matsuda and Motohama. The following night, Issei is assigned another job but is unable to receive a pact. Issei thinks it over during P.E. class and ends up sleeping in the infirmary along with Rias. Noting Issei's lecherous desires, Rias offers her body to him in exchange for a pact. That night, Rias accompanies him on his next job: helping a foreign exchange student named Susan inside a Samurai outfit to retrieve her notebook. She also requests help to attract her love. After the unusual meet up with her love, Issei successfully completes the job. He tries to get his reward from Rias but loses his chance when the other members arrive. Rias instead gives him a hug, shocking everyone.
7	7	"I Get a Familiar!"; Transliteration: "Tsukaima, Getto Shimasu!" (Japanese: 使い魔、ゲットします!)	Takenori Mihara	Takao Yoshioka	February 17, 2012
Rias decides that it is time for Issei and Asia to have servant familiars. The school's student council visits the club room, and Issei learns that they are another faction of devils. Since only one group is allowed to enter the world of familiars per month, the two groups compete to see who gets to go first. Initially, what starts as a normal tennis match turns frightful as Rias and Sona use magic to enhance their moves. They end up destroying much of the equipment, leading to a draw. Rias and her peerage later wins in the dodge ball match, allowing them to pick new familiars first. During the search for familiars, they are greeted by Master Familiar Towji. He guides Issei and Asia throughout the forest and shows different creatures they can choose. The group later finds a Sprite Dragon, an extremely rare familiar difficult to obtain. Suddenly, slime litters the forest and obliterates clothes. Issei wants to make slime as his familiar and uses Asia to protect it. He is knocked out by the Sprite Dragon, who has taken a liking to Asia. In the end, Asia accepts him as a familiar while Rias notes Issei still has ways to go.
8	8	"I Pick a Fight!"; Transliteration: "Kenka, Urimasu!" (Japanese: 喧嘩、売ります!)	Koji Kobayashi	Takao Yoshioka	February 24, 2012
Issei dreams that he is marrying Rias, which leads him to get in touch with his inner dragon. After school, Issei encounters Asia in the shower, who confesses a desire to have a deeper relationship with Issei. Later, Rias appears in Issei's bedroom that night looking to lose her virginity. However, her attempt is suddenly interrupted by the arrival of Grayfia Lucifuge, the wife and queen of Rias' brother Sirzechs Lucifer, who initially mocks Issei as a lowborn. At Kuoh Academy, Issei and his group are introduced to Riser Phoenix, a devil who is to be engaged to Rias. When Riser proposes to Rias, she declines. He mocks Issei's dream of having a harem, leading to him having one of her pieces hit Issei in the stomach. In response, the Gremory and the Phoenix clans organize a ratings game.
9	9	"I've Begun My Training!"; Transliteration: "Shugyō, Hajimemashita!" (Japanese: 修行、はじめました!)	Kosuke Kobayashi	Takao Yoshioka	March 2, 2012
Rias agreed to fight with Phoenix in ten days' time. In the meantime, Issei begins to train in an isolated area under Rias' supervision as they prepare for the rating game. Issei fails in each lesson from everyone and is greatly discouraged. First, he loses to Kiba in sword fighting, then he loses to Akeno and Asia in manipulating magic, and finally he loses to Koneko and gets beaten badly as a result. However, in Lesson four, he creates a power through visualizing the breasts of his intended victims. That night, Issei, in a waterfall mausoleum, tells Rias that he admires her as the best mentor for him, however he admits that he isn't useful for her and considers himself as the most useless devil. He laments that he has always caused her trouble and claims that even though he possesses a Sacred Gear, it's useless if he is unable to fully use it and considers himself a total failure for her and starts crying. Rias figures out that he indeed lacks self-confidence, so she promises him to give him some self-confidence. She afterwards orders him to rest for tonight until he is fully capable. The next morning, he starts training by using his sacred gear. Boosting 12 times, he creates an aura of energy around himself and throws a powerful beam of red light towards Kiba, which destroys a nearby mountain. Although he quickly tires himself out, Rias, remembering his quotes about how he admired her the way she is, starts to grow affections for him.
10	10	"The Showdown Begins!"; Transliteration: "Kessen, Hajimarimasu!" (Japanese: 決戦、始まります!)	Masayuki Iimura	Takao Yoshioka	March 9, 2012
The battle between the Phoenix clan and the Gremory clan begins. Issei unveils his embarrassing finishing move Dress Break but proves his worth. The Gremory team suffers their first loss when a comrade fights against superior numbers of the Phoenix clan. Issei, enraged by the fate of his comrade, challenges the enemy Queen.
11	11	"The Acclaimed Battle Continues!"; Transliteration: "Zessan, Kessenchū desu!" (Japanese: 絶賛、決戦中です!)	Taro Kubo	Takao Yoshioka	March 16, 2012
The Rating Game continues. Both sides endure further losses and Riser has not received a scratch due to the Phoenix family's special ability. Rias concludes the game by making a hard choice.
12	12	"I'm Here to Keep My Promise!"; Transliteration: "Yakusoku, Mamori ni Kimashita!" (Japanese: 約束、守りに来ました！)	Tetsuya Yanagisawa	Takao Yoshioka	March 23, 2012
Issei wakes up to find himself passed out after the Rating Game. Soon after, Grayfia informs Issei the results of the Rating Game. She gives Issei a magic circle that will allow him to attend the Gremory-Phoenix engagement party with Sirzechs' message that if Issei wants to do something, then to go in and rescue Rias by force. Issei crashes the party but is interrupted when Sirzechs comes in and offers to host a one-on-one battle between Riser and Issei to liven things up, claiming to have found the Rating Game unsatisfying. Riser and Issei engage in fierce duel that ends with him hitting Riser with a crucifix and holy water. Issei discovers what was on the back of the transport circle Grayfia gave him: a griffin that was to be used to help him escape with Rias if he had lost again. Sirzechs discusses his feelings and plans about Rias' forced engagement with Grayfia. Rias, overwhelmed by Issei's feelings and determination, rewards him with her first kiss. As a result of the duel between Dragon and Phoenix, Rias decides to live in Issei's house as well.
13	OVA–1	"I'm Harvesting Breasts! (episode lists the name as "Boobs Bearing Fruit!")"; Transliteration: "Oppai, Minorimasu!" (Japanese: おっぱい、実ります！)	Koji Kobayashi	Takao Yoshioka	September 6, 2012
The opening is the Gremory group hunting a stray devil named Maverick. After sending him to stand trial in the Underworld it is discovered that he was working in a lab developing Chimeras. The next day while Issei is wondering about Maverick's parting words, he overhears how many of the school girls are getting sick with anemia and that all the victims possess the same characteristic. Finding the source of the illness, Issei wants to protect it upon finding out its special ability. However, the rest of the group disapproves strongly, especially as some of the members are about to be inflicted with the same illness.
14	OVA–2	"I'm Searching for Breasts! (episode lists name as "I Seek Boobies!")"; Transliteration: "Oppai, Motomemasu!" (Japanese: おっぱい、求めます!)	Masayuki Iimura	Takao Yoshioka	May 31, 2013
Issei and Asia ask Rias to observe how the others do their jobs so they can learn how to do theirs better. The two are surprised on how simple the tasks are, from playing games, to cooking, to giving a foot massage (albeit with Akeno doing it in a sadistic way). When the gang accompanies Rias on her job to check to see if an Egyptian coffin is cursed, Issei becomes possessed by the mummy, an Egyptian Magician named Unas, who is just as perverted as Issei. Unas claims that he'll only release him if they remove the curse that binds him, the methods of removing it being perverted in nature. First, Rias dances in a skimpy outfit; second, a kiss from Asia (albeit accidentally on the cheek); and third, rubbing his face on Akeno's breasts and hair. It turns out that he tricked them to free himself as the curse was placed on him by a female Devil from the Agares Clan who he tried to make his bride. While initially having the upper hand by binding the girls with his bandages, Issei is able to use Dress Break to free them, and Unas is destroyed by a combination of Akeno's thunder and Rias' Power of Destruction.

=== Specials ===
No.	Title	Original release date
1	"Going Sunbathing (Let's Go to the beach)" Transliteration: "Kaisuiyoku, Ikimasu" (Japanese: 海水浴、行きます)	March 21, 2012
The Occult Research Club goes on a beach outing. Issei accidentally get tangled in Rias' swimsuit and is punished by being beaten by Koneko with a baseball bat.
2	"Akeno's Personal Training"; Transliteration: "Akeno Onee-sama, Kojin Shugyō desu wa" (Japanese: 朱乃お姉さま、個人修行ですわ)	April 25, 2012
Issei is being given lessons in magic by Rias' queen, Akeno. After getting beaten, he spills a parfait on her. She requests him to lick it off her chest. At this point, Issei wakes up in Asia's lap and gets shocked by Rassei (her familiar).
3	"Koneko Goes a Little Over the Top...Meow"; Transliteration: "Koneko, Chotto Daitan... Nyan" (Japanese: 小猫、ちょっと大胆、、、にゃん)	May 23, 2012
Koneko accidentally has her personality reversed magically, making her incredibly sexually active and reversing her sexual preference. The episode closes when Issei arrives to the clubroom late to find Koneko has taken Rias & Asia into the shower with her.
4	"The Untold Story of the Dress Break's Birth?"; Transliteration: "Doresu Bureiku, Tanjō Hiwa?" (Japanese: ドレスブレイク、誕生秘話？)	June 27, 2012
A few flashbacks of how Issei first found out and eventually perfected his special move, Dress Break. The episode closes with him testing the move on the two most powerful Devils he knows: Rias and Akeno, much to the former's dismay.
5	"Making Udon"; Transliteration: "Udon, Tsukurimasu" (Japanese: うどん、作ります)	July 25, 2012
As part of the penalty from a bet, Sona and Tsubaki make udon for the Occult Research Club; however, an accident makes the udon come to life in a very peculiar way.
6	"Asia Transforms"; Transliteration: "Āshia, Henshin Shimasu" (Japanese: アーシア、変身します)	August 29, 2012
Asia wants to prove she is just as bad as any demon by using ideas found in Issei's magazines, going as far as dressing up like a harlot and seducing him, but Issei tells her that she should just be herself. The episode closes with Rias telling Issei to wipe off the kiss mark given to him by Asia.
