= Takao (name) =

- Gender: Male

Origin
- Origin: Japanese
- Meaning: Different meanings depending on the kanji used

Takao (written: 貴男, 貴雄, 隆男, 隆雄, 隆夫, 高男, 高生, 孝男, 孝雄, 孝夫, 孝生, 孝朗, 京夫 or たかお in hiragana) is a masculine Japanese given name. Notable people with the name include:

- Takao Abe (阿部 孝夫; born 1943), Japanese politician
- Takao Aoki (青木 たかお), Japanese manga artist
- Takao Doi (土井 隆雄; born 1954), Japanese astronaut
- Takao Fujii (藤井 孝男; born 1943), Japanese politician
- Takao Fujinami (藤波 孝生; 1932–2007), Japanese politician
- Takao Hikigi (引木 孝夫; born 1944), Japanese ice hockey player
- Takao Horiuchi (堀内 孝雄; born 1949), Japanese singer
- Takao Isokawa (born 1984), Japanese sport wrestler
- Takao Ito (伊藤 高男; born 1952), Japanese ski jumper
- Takao Kajimoto (梶本 隆夫; 1935–2006), Japanese baseball player
- Takao Kawaguchi (川口 孝夫; born 1950), Japanese judoka
- Takao Kisugi (来生 たかお; born 1950), Japanese singer and composer
- Takao Kitabata (北畑 隆生), Japanese civil servant
- Takao Kobayashi (小林 隆男; born 1961), Japanese astronomer
- Takao Kogo (向後 隆男; born 1941), Japanese rower
- Takao Koyama (小山 高生; born 1948), Japanese screenwriter and writer
- Takao Kuwamoto (桑元 孝雄; born 1970), Japanese baseball player
- Takao Makino (牧野 京夫; born 1959), Japanese politician
- Takao Nakano (中野 貴雄; born 1962), Japanese film director, screenwriter and actor
- Takao Nishiyama (西山 孝朗; born 1940), Japanese footballer
- Takao Nogami (born 1971), Japanese golfer
- Takao Obana (尾花 高夫; born 1957), Japanese baseball player and manager
- Takao Ochi (越智 隆雄; born 1964), Japanese politician
- Takao Oishi (大石 隆夫; born 1964), Japanese footballer
- Takao Okawara (大河原 孝夫; born 1949), Japanese film director
- Takao Omori (大森 隆男; born 1969), Japanese professional wrestler
- Takao Osawa (大沢 たかお; born 1968), Japanese actor
- Takao Saito (斎藤 隆夫; born 1936), Japanese manga artist
- Saitō Takao (politician) (斎藤 隆夫; 1870–1949), Japanese politician
- Takao Saito (cinematographer) (斎藤 孝雄; born 1920), Japanese cinematographer
- Takao Sakai (堺 孝夫; born 1959), Japanese bobsledder
- Takao Sakamoto (阪本 孝男; born 1958), Japanese high jumper
- Takao Sakurai (桜井 孝雄; 1941–2012), Japanese boxer
- Takao Suzuki (鈴木 貴男; born 1976), Japanese tennis player
- Takao Suzuki (sociolinguist) (鈴木 孝夫; born 1926), Japanese sociolinguist
- Takao Tanabe (born 1926), Canadian painter
- Takao Wada (born 1953), Japanese racing driver
- Takao Watanabe (渡辺 孝男; born 1950), Japanese politician
- Takao Yamauchi (山内 貴雄; born 1978), Japanese footballer
- Takao Yoshioka (吉岡たかを), Japanese screenwriter

Takao (written: 高雄 or 高尾) is also a Japanese surname. Notable people with the surname include:

- Erika Takao (高雄 恵利加; born 1987), Japanese tennis player
- Shinji Takao (高尾 紳路; born 1976), Japanese Go player
- Soma Takao (高尾 蒼馬; born 1988), Japanese professional wrestler

== Fictional characters ==
- Takao Kinomiya, a character from the anime series Beyblade
- Kazunari Takao, a character from the manga series Kuroko's Basketball

== See also ==
- Japanese ship Takao
