= High School DxD Born =

- No. of episodes: 12

Release
- Original network: AT-X
- Original release: April 4 – June 20, 2015

Season chronology
- ← Previous; High School DxD New Next → High School DxD Hero

The third season of the High School DxD anime television series, High School DxD BorN (ハイスクールD×D(ディーディー) BorN(ボーン), Haisukūru Dī Dī Bōn), was directed by Tetsuya Yanagisawa and produced by TNK. Its first nine episodes adapts material from the fifth to the seventh volumes of the light novels by Ichiei Ishibumi and Miyama-Zero, while the last three episodes form an original self-contained story arc.

The season originally ran from April 4, to June 20, 2015, on TV Tokyo's satellite channel AT-X in Japan. In North America, the anime series is licensed by Funimation for simulcast on their website and home video releases on DVD and Blu-ray. In Australia, the series is licensed by Madman Entertainment. Funimation released the first season on August 20, 2013, the second season on November 11, 2014, and the third season on September 6, 2016.

The original score for the series was composed by Ryosuke Nakanishi. For the third season, the opening theme was titled "Bless Your Name" and performed by ChouCho. StylipS performed the ending theme titled "Give Me Secret".

== Episodes ==
No. overall	No. in season	Title	Directed by	Written by	Original release date
28	1	"Summer Break! Off to the Underworld!"; Transliteration: "Natsuyasumi, Meikai e GO!" (Japanese: 夏休み、冥界へGO)	Shunji Yoshida	Takao Yoshioka	April 4, 2015
Issei has recurring visions of Raynare that cause him to question the girls around him. After another hectic morning with Rias, Akeno and Asia, Issei discovers that the Hyodo residence has been rebuilt as a six-story mansion including a training ground, bath and swimming pool. His parents are easily deceived, thinking that the Gremory family works in the construction business. Summer vacation is coming up, and the Occult Research Club members are going on a trip to the underworld. They enter by means of a protected train route, encountering Sona, Genshiro and Tsubaki also on their way to the underworld. Koneko is quiet and subdued during their trip. A surprise attack planned by Azazel helps determine what sort of training each member needs. While at the hot springs, Azazel expands Issei's perverted knowledge of the female body. Elsewhere, a nekomata named Kuroka intends to meet Koneko, her little sister.
29	2	"Young Devils Gather"; Transliteration: "Wakate Akuma, Shūgō desu!" (Japanese: 若手悪魔、集合です)	Matsuo Asami	Takao Yoshioka	April 11, 2015
The Occult Research Club members have dinner at the Gremory residence with Rias' family members. Asia and Xenovia join Issei in bed, claiming that they are uncomfortable with the luxurious setting. The next day, Azazel has them each start on their 20-day training session. Issei trains with Tannin, a reincarnated former Dragon King. After finishing the training, Issei is still unable to activate his Balance Breaker, so Azazel suggests the need for a catalyst for the activation. In the evening, they go to a gathering of the major families in the underworld. Before the gathering, Issei visits Koneko and is surprised to discover her concealed Anthropomorphic features. Rias shares Koneko's true identity as a nekomata and past with him. Later, during the party, Issei learns of the identity of a figure he encountered during his training, Sairaorg Bael. Issei also encounters Ravel Phoenix, the little sister of Rias' former fiancé, and Issei's former opponent, Riser Phoenix. She introduces herself as a free bishop piece and invites him to visit her soon. Shortly after, Issei notices Koneko's abrupt departure from the party. He follows her with Rias, and it is revealed that Koneko, who was taken in by Sirzechs and given to Rias, felt the presence of her sister, Kuroka, who killed her master and disappeared. Kuroka reunites with Koneko, addressing her by her birth name, Shirone.
30	3	"Cat and Dragon"; Transliteration: "Neko to Doragon" (Japanese: 猫とドラゴン)	Matsuo Asami	Takao Yoshioka	April 18, 2015
During Koneko's reunion with Kuroka, Rias recalls a conversation she had before with Koneko about not overworking herself. Koneko did not believe much in her powers and abilities in comparison to the other members of the club. Meanwhile, back at the party/event, Lord Odin arrives and is greeted by Lord Zechs. Most of the original party attendees appear happy with the arrivals to the party. Rias and Issei catch up with Koneko and Kuroka. They defend Koneko from Kuroka, who implores her to join Vali's team. Loki arrives to the party to object to a new pact between Sirzechs and Odin. Loki's objection is that Ragnarok will never be achieved if the pact is completed. He admits to working with the Chaos Brigade before a battle breaks out. In the battle Akeno's father helps her and threatens Loki and in the meantime Beelzebub sends Loki away. The previous Dragon King from Issei's training helps with Rias and Issei's fight against Kuroka. Rias explains Koneko's painful past while living without any family save for the Gremory clan. Issei also swears to protect Koneko as a family member. Unfortunately, Kuroka uses a poison that severely weakens Rias and Koneko. Things intensify at the castle as Loki attacks the guests. Issei tries to use his usual methods of fighting but they have changed since training. He ends up taking a full blast to protect Rias and Koneko. Koneko encourages Issei and he realizes he has to touch Rias' breasts to upgrade his power. After poking both of her nipples, Issei gains his Balance breaker powers, eventually overpowering Kuroka. Koneko seems to feel better about her position in the club. Issei and Rias run into each other in the hallway and Issei is amazed at how well Rias takes care of the group. Meanwhile, the Lords realize they have a problem in the form of Loki.
31	4	"Interception, Commence!"; Transliteration: "Geigeki, Kaishi desu!" (Japanese: 迎撃、開始です！)	Yasuhiro Minami	Takao Yoshioka	April 25, 2015
The Three Factions are discussing how to deal with Loki. The members of the Sitri family volunteer to follow after Loki as Rias calls on Sirzechs to help. Irina will join Rias, Xenovia, Issei, and Akeno. While gearing up and saying goodbye, the party is joined by Rossweisse, Odin's Bodyguard. Issei promises to protect Koneko, who is a bit worried about their trip, before both the Gremory Clan and Sitri family set out to chase down Loki. Issei and Saji discuss their respective club presidents before Loki appears. Loki and Rossweisse get into an argument before Loki summons Fenrir's children and the Midgard Serpent. Issei suits up and tries to battle against the two children of Fenrir. Xenovia and Kiba come to his aid. Tsubaki uses Mirror Alice against the serpent, sending its flames back at it. Irina transforms into what looks to be an angel and uses the power of Michael to attack. Loki finds that the group is more formidable than he believed. Koneko and Akeno both unleash new powerful forms. Rossweisse tries to reason with Loki again but he claims to be fixing Lord Odin's mistake. Saji traps Loki with his upgraded whip, but Loki breaks free and rains hail down on the protagonists. The fighters are forced to use the remainder of their phoenix tears. The hammer of Thor appears as a gift from Odin. Rossweisse tells Issei to use it, but he is wounded by Fenrir right as he tries to use it. The Occult Research Club comes to his aid and try to take down Fenrir and the serpent. Rias however invokes her last bits of strength, swearing to exact revenge on Loki.
32	5	"The Last Day of Summer Break!"; Transliteration: "Natsuyasumi Saigo no Hidesu!" (Japanese: 夏休み最後の日です!)	Takahiro Majima	Takao Yoshioka	May 2, 2015
While Rias attempts to stop Loki at the cost of her own life, Kuroka and swordsman Arthur Pendragon capture Fenrir and take him to Vali. Revived by the Phoenix Tears, Issei uses the Mjölnir to capture Loki, but not before Loki curses the houses. Sairaorg defeats the Midgard Serpent and suggests to Rias that they should have a rating game soon. On the last day of the summer break, the Occult Research Club and Rias' family go their separate ways, with Koneko, having grown significantly closer to Issei, lying on his lap the ride home. At Akeno's request, Rias allows her to go with Issei on a date. The next day, Akeno and Issei go out on their date. Issei discovers that he and Akeno are being pursued by their friends, they flee; however, they encounter Odin, Rossweisse and Baraqiel, who return with them to Issei's house. Akeno later tells Issei about her past life with her mother, Shuri Himejima, a priestess of the Himejima clan, and how she found Baraqiel wounded after a fight which lead to her marriage with Baraqiel as well as her death and why Akeno resents Baraqiel. While on the run, Akeno was eventually taken in by Rias. She puts his hand on her breast, where Issei unlocks a new ability. Akeno apologizes to Issei for her actions and goes to prepare dinner. As Odin and Baraqiel are leaving, Akeno offers Baraqiel a bento box as an act of reconciliation.
33	6	"Second Semester has Started!"; Transliteration: "Nigakki, Hajimemashita!" (Japanese: 二学期、はじまりました！)	Hodaka Kuramoto	Takao Yoshioka	May 9, 2015
The second semester starts, as Irina now enrolls herself to the Kuoh Academy being in the same class as Issei. She then reintroduces herself to the Occult Research Club members as a member of the Brave Saints and Michael's Ace there to train them. After school, Irina notices a depressed Rossweisse at Issei's house after being left behind by Odin. Meanwhile Issei and Asia are sent shopping to help prepare for a welcoming party for Irina. On their way back, Asia almost trips and is supported by Diodora who reveals that he is the devil Asia rescued in the past and proceed to propose to Asia. Night time in the Hyoudou Residence, Issei and Asia report their encounter to Rias until Gasper arrives and tells them that the preparation for the welcoming party is complete. During the party, Azazel joins in and shows everyone in the party a documentary about Issei's love of breasts which triggered Issei's uprising popularity with the kids earning himself the nicknames: Breast Dragon Emperor and Perv Dragon, much to his chagrin and Ddraig's depression. The next day, Issei's class prepares for the sports day and he is tricked by Kiryuu into joining a three-legged race with Asia. At noon, Issei joins his classmate on their preparation for the sports day as Issei starts practicing with Asia. Later, Rias shows the many invitations sent by Diodora for Asia, saying that she will dispose the invitations while Issei and Asia head to train for the sports day. While practicing, Xenovia convinces Asia to let Issei to have a three way with them but Irina intervenes. At the club room, Rias reveals the Rating Game tournament among the Young Devils and their first opponent for the tournament is Diodora Astaroth.
34	7	"The Night Before Battle!"; Transliteration: "Taisen Zen'ya desu!" (Japanese: 対戦前夜です!)	Kaoru Habana	Takao Yoshioka	May 16, 2015
After watching a recording of the Rating Game between Sairaorg and Zephyrdor, the Occult Research Club are visited by Diodora Astaroth, who offers to trade Bishops but is rejected by Rias. Before leaving, Diodora attempts to court Asia again, and is stopped by Issei. He insults Issei by calling him a filthy Dragon, causing Asia to slap him. Diodora then announces that he will defeat Issei in the next Rating Game. On their way back from their client's request, Issei and Koneko are confronted by Vali and Kuroka who tells Issei to be careful of Diodora. Back at the Hyoudou Residence, heeding Irina's advice, the girls cosplay for Issei until a fight breaks out between Rias and Akeno. Issei then informs Rias about his encounter with Vali. At his house, Azazel is seen contacting Sirzechs, discussing Diodora's sudden increase in strength as they prepare for the worst case scenario. On the day of the Rating Game, Rias and her servants teleport to the Rating Game field while Azazel, Rossweisse, and Irina do the same secretly. At the Rating Game field, Rias notices the irregularity of the match, as a group of Devils starts to emerge from magic circles, revealed to be the Old Satan Faction with Diodora being in cahoots with them. Diodora then proceeds to kidnap Asia and carries her away, leaving the remaining Devils to dispose of the Gremory clan.
35	8	"We will save Asia!"; Transliteration: "Āshia, Sukuimasu!" (Japanese: アーシア、救います！)	Shunji Yoshida	Takao Yoshioka	May 23, 2015
The Gremory group arrives at the temple where Diodora Astaroth is holding Asia Argento hostage. Diodora informs the Gremory group that even though he has halted the rating game itself because of the attack by the Khaos brigade he still intends to have the Occult Research Club fight his servants. To protect Asia, the Gremory group agrees to split into two groups to fight Diodora's servants. When Issei's Dress Break on Diodora's pawns and rooks fail, he uses his Bilingual technique on the girls. Using the information Issei provides, Gasper freezes the pawns while Koneko kills them and Xenovia kills the rooks. Meanwhile, Rias and Akeno battle the Queen and two Bishops. At Koneko's suggestion, Issei offers to go on a date with Akeno next Saturday, sparking a series of 'I can do better than you' power increases between Rias and Akeno, who obliterate the enemy forces. The protagonists soon encounter Freed Sellzen, who reincarnated as a Chimeria, an "upgrade" by his new allies in the Khaos Brigade. Selzen reveals that Diodora encountered Asia and fatally injured himself to make the nun heal him. Aware of Raynare's plans to take Asia's Twilight Healing for herself, Diodora intended to kill her and revive Asia using one of his Evil Pieces. Back in the present, Kiba finally kills Freed. Diodora reveals that he has already told Asia his history, and intends to sink her further into depression by killing the Occult Research Club in front of her and then raping her. Despite Diodora's boasts that he comes from the same bloodline as one of the current Four Devil Kings, Ajuka Beelzebub, and has consumed one of Orphis' snakes therefore granting him huge levels of power, Issei uses his Balance Breaker and defeats him. Diodora reveals that the contraption restraining Asia was a creation of a top-tier Longinus user designed to destroy her in the event of his defeat. Issei however uses his Dress Break technique to destroy Asia's restraints along with her clothes. With Asia safe, she prays that she will be allowed to stay with Issei forever, but disappears.
36	9	"Dragon of Dragon"; Transliteration: "Doragon Obu Doragon" (Japanese: ドラゴン・オブ・ドラゴン)	Masayuki Nomoto; Yasuhiro Minami	Takao Yoshioka	May 30, 2015
After Asia disappears, Shalba Beelzebub, a devil, tells the Occult Research Club that he has killed Asia by sending her into the Dimensional Gap. Xenovia attempts to avenge Asia, but Shalba easily defeats her and kills Diodora when he mentions the New and Old Factions. Enraged by Asia's assumed demise, Issei activates his Juggernaut Drive. Meanwhile, Creuserey Asmodeus, another devil, attempts to battle Azazel and his Down Fall Dragon Spear but Sir Zechs intervenes and kills Creuserey. Using his Juggernaut Drive powers, Issei overpowers and "kills" Shalba with the "Longinus Smasher." Vali's team arrives and brings Asia back from the Dimensional Gap, much to Xenovia's happiness. Vali and Rias decide to work together to calm Issei's rage; Vali uses his own Juggernaut Drive to match Issei and drain away his aura as Rias reaches out to him to calm him down. The Occult Research Club, Vali's team and Orphis, who says that she has removed a curse from Issei, witness the arrival of Great Red before Issei collapses from exhaustion.
37	10	"Occult Research Club Vanishes!?"; Transliteration: "Oka-ken Shōshitsu!?" (Japanese: オカ研消失!?)	Matsuo Asami	Takao Yoshioka	June 6, 2015
When Sir Zechs informs everyone about Issei's current condition, Asia uses her powers to heal Issei of his wounds before professing her love for him. Sir Zechs and Azazel discuss the fall of the Satan Faction as well as the Chaos Brigade, as well as Great Red being in the dimensional gap as well as Orphis' plans to kill Great Red in the dimensional gap. Loki curses Orphis for her intrusion with Issei, although he has intentions for Rias. At the Occult Research Club, Issei encourages Rias to no longer think. During Issei and Rias' conversation, Asia and Issei are seen training for their three-legged race, repeatedly stepping in rhythm. Issei leaves Asia to get a stop watch, running into Koneko along the way. The two find Gasper lying on the ground, Koneko then discovers something in the other room. The Occult Research Club bursts into the room to find another Issei and Rias holding each other. Issei attempts to save Rias, but she stops him, with her magic. Issei, in disbelief, then watches as the other Issei and Rias leave together, destroying the room along with their exit. Issei, Koneko, and Gasper are seen outside, along with the other members of the Occult Research Club as well as Irina and Sona, telling them about what had happened. Azazel and Rossweisse then join the Occult Research Club, explaining that Loki is behind the fake Issei, as he had revealed his plan to Odin sealing himself up in the process. Issei later realizes that his fear in his heart of what the girls true feelings, has allowed Loki to curse Issei. Loki also uses the same doubt in Rias's heart to curse her. Sir Zechs and Ajuka discover that Rias is in the dimensional gap, and Issei asks Koneko if she can contact Kuroka, as he wants to go to see Vali.
38	11	"I Will Fight!"; Transliteration: "Ore, Tatakaimasu!" (Japanese: 俺、戦います!)	Motohiro Abe	Takao Yoshioka	June 13, 2015
Despite Rossweisse trying to dissuade him from meeting Vali, Issei says he is willing to risk anything to save Rias. Finally giving in, Sirzechs decides to leave Rias' rescue to Issei and his friends. Issei and Koneko encounter Kuroka, who implores him to hand Koneko over to no avail. To reach the Dimensional Gap, Vali questions Issei on what he will do if he rejects him. In response, Issei summons out his Boosted Gear, saying that he will use force if needed. Pleased with his answer and determination, Vali gives the order to Arthur who reveals his family's prized treasure the Holy King Sword, Collbrande, and its ability to control and cut through dimensions. Before leaving, Azazel hands the Down Fall Dragon Spear to Asia, saying that it will protect her when needed. With the preparation complete, Arthur cuts through the dimension and brings the protagonists to the Dimensional Gap. Happy to see Rias again, Asia tries to approach her until Akeno notices Rias trying to attack Asia and rescues her in time. Left with no option, the team decides to suppress Rias first for her safety. In retaliation, Rias releases a powerful surge of Power of Destruction, deflecting all of their attacks at the same time. Issei begs Rias to stop as Koneko notices Rias responding to their voices. They immediately attempt to bring Rias back to her senses and reach her. However, Rias is corrupted by the cursed fragment of the Scale Mail, and she battles her friends. Akeno begs Issei to rescue Rias by fighting her as he is the only person capable of doing so. Initially refusing to do so Issei enters his Balance Breaker, and proceeds to battle Rias as their clash destroys the field created by Arthur forcing the others to return to the human world while Rias and Issei continue their battle.
39	12	"Any Time, For All Time!"; Transliteration: "Itsudemo, Itsumademo!" (Japanese: いつでも、いつまでも！)	Hodaka Kuramoto	Takao Yoshioka	June 20, 2015
As the battle continues, Issei eventually talks Rias out of her mind control, forcing the cursed fragment out of Rias. The cursed Juggernaut Drive fragment takes on Issei appearance before transforming into the Juggernaut Drive. Back in the human world, the protagonists are sent back to Kuoh Academy with Irina and Rossweisse tending to them. After a brief discussion with Azazel on the Juggernaut Drive's fragment being used by Loki, the girls starts to pray for Issei and Rias' safe return. Inside the Dimensional Gap, Loki's curse, transformed into the Juggernaut Drive, continues its assault on Issei and Rias. Issei, determined to protect Rias, once again dons the Scale Mail armor and through the modification of the Evil Pieces previously done by Ajuka, allows Issei to form two cannons on his Scale Mail as he finally destroys the curse, obliterating the fragment. The victory, however, is short lived as the field created by Arthur gets destroyed due to the impact of the battle as both Issei and Rias gets swallowed by the Dimensional Gap ending at some unknown dimension with an unknown creature. They see Great Red, and follow him, ending up on a beach where they discuss their relationship before appearing back at the school. Vali reveals to Azazel that he helped Issei in the hopes of watching his encounter with Great Red. The next day, Issei's parents return home and Rossweisse becomes Rias' rook and moves in with Issei. She also becomes a civics teacher at Issei's school. Issei tells Azazel about his dream of becoming the Harem King.
40	OVA–1	"The Unresurrected Phoenix"; Transliteration: "Yomigaerarenai fushichou" (Japanese: 蘇らない不死鳥)	Tetsuya Yanagisawa	Takao Yoshioka	December 9, 2015
Ravel Phenex comes to ask for the Occult Research Club's help concerning her brother, it is decided that he would learn fortitude from Issei. Riser ends up terrified of all things Dragon-related after his fight with Issei, and so Issei volunteers to help him learn to overcome his fear in the Dragon mountains, with the help of Tannin and Ravel. When Rias and the other girls bathe at a nearby hot spring, Riser decides to escape to take a peek. However, Issei has the same idea, and in the process, he realizes Riser has escaped. Determined to protect the image of Rias' and Akeno's breasts from Riser, Issei finds him ensues a fight with him. After beating Riser, Issei is caught at the hot spring by the girls. It ends with a continuation of the fight between Issei and Riser, who is fighting to take one glance of Rias' boobs, with Rias and Tannin watching the fight from afar, considering Riser to have successfully overcome his trauma.

=== Specials ===
No.	Title	Original release date
1	"Rias and Akeno, Girl Fight!?"; Transliteration: "Riasu to Akeno Onna no Tatakai!?" (Japanese: リアスと朱乃 女の戦い!?)	July 24, 2015
Rias and Akeno try different acts of seducing Issei to "win Issei's heart", as said by Rias. Eventually, they have Issei chose who he likes more. Issei ties it and faints from a nosebleed.
2	"Church Trio's Underwear, Amen!"; Transliteration: "Kyōkai Torio no Shitagi Amen!" (Japanese: 教会トリオの下着 アーメン！)	August 26, 2015
The Church Trio discuss underwear. They realize that Issei was watching them, and Irina kicks him away.
3	"Koneko's Senjutsu Treatment ~nyan" Transliteration: "Koneko no Senjutsu Chiryō nyan" (Japanese: 小猫の仙術治療にゃん)	October 28, 2015
Koneko is healing Issei. She suggests having sex to heal him faster, but Issei dissuades her of that idea. Issei says that the other girls are a bad influence on her, and Rias overhears this and punishes him.
4	"Levia-tan and So-tan ☆"; Transliteration: "Revuia-tan to Sō-tan ☆" (Japanese: レヴィアたんとソーたん☆)	November 25, 2015
Serafall-leviathan and her sister Sona have some family time. Only Serafall is enjoying herself.
5	"Steamy Grayfia"; Transliteration: "Yukemuri Gureifia" (Japanese: (湯けむりグレイフィア)	December 25, 2015
A drunk Grayfia spends some awkward time with Issei in a sauna down in the Underworld. Issei is half-ashamed, but he is caught by a shocked Rias before he can leave.
6	"Authentic Record! Rossweisse-sensei"; Transliteration: "Jitsuroku! Rosuvuaise-sensei" (Japanese: 実録！ ロスヴァイセ先生)	January 27, 2016
Rossweisse is determined to help Issei pass his exams, so he isn't held back next year, resulting in some awkward situations.
