= 高雄 =

高雄 may refer to:

- Kaohsiung, a city in Taiwan
- Kaohsiung County, a former county in Taiwan
- Port of Kaohsiung
- Kaohsiung metropolitan area
- Takao Prefecture, a prefecture of Taiwan during the Japanese era
- Takao, a place within Ukyō-ku, Kyoto
- Mount Takao, a mountain in Kyoto, Japan, location of the Jingo-ji temple
- Japanese ship Takao, a list of Japanese ships
- Eddy Ko, a Hong Kong film star
- Hung Cao, American politician.

== See also ==
- Takao (disambiguation)
- Gaoxiong Road station
