= Takao =

Takao may refer to:

== Geography ==
- Mount Takao, a mountain in Tokyo, Japan
- Mount Takao, a mountain in Kyoto, Japan, location of the Jingo-ji temple
- Takao, the Japanese name for Kaohsiung, a municipality in Taiwan
- Takao Prefecture, an administrative division of Taiwan during the Japanese rule

== Other uses ==
- Takao (name), Japanese given name and surname (including a list of people)
- Kinomiya Takao or Tyson Granger in the Japanese Beyblade manga series

== See also ==
- Takao Station (disambiguation)
- 高雄 (disambiguation)
