= Daimidaler: Prince vs Penguin Empire =

Japanese manga series and its anime adaptation

- Cover of Daimidaler the Sound Robot volume 1 featuring Koichi Madanbashi.

健全ロボ ダイミダラー (Kenzen Robo Daimidarā)
- Genre: Comedy, mecha
- Manga
- Written by: Asaki Nakama
- Published by: Enterbrain
- Magazine: Fellows!
- Original run: December 15, 2008 – October 15, 2012
- Volumes: 4
- Manga

Daimidaler the Sound Robot OGS
- Written by: Asaki Nakama
- Published by: Enterbrain
- Magazine: Harta
- Original run: October 15, 2013 – June 15, 2016
- Volumes: 2
- Anime television series
- Directed by: Tetsuya Yanagisawa
- Written by: Takao Yoshioka
- Music by: Ryosuke Nakanishi
- Studio: TNK
- Licensed by: Crunchyroll
- Original network: AT-X (uncensored)
- Original run: April 5, 2014 – June 21, 2014
- Episodes: 12 + 6 OVA
- icon

Daimidaler: Prince vs Penguin Empire, known in Japan as Daimidaler the Sound Robot (健全ロボ ダイミダラー, Kenzen Robo Daimidarā; "sound" as in health), is a Japanese manga series written and illustrated by Asaki Nakama, serialized in Enterbrain's seinen manga magazine Fellows! from 2008 to 2012 and collected in four tankōbon volumes. A sequel titled Daimidaler the Sound Robot OGS began serialization in the same magazine (now called Harta) from October 2013. An anime television series adaptation by TNK aired from April 5 to June 21, 2014, on AT-X. It has been licensed for legal streaming by Funimation.

== Plot ==
Kōichi Madanbashi is a high schooler who possesses Hi-ERo particles, which are used as an energy source for the robot Daimidaler. He obtains these particles by groping females and uses them to power up the robot in order to fight penguin-shaped robots from the supposedly evil Penguin Empire.

== Characters ==
=== Daimidaler ===
Kōichi Madanbashi (真玉橋 孝一, Madanbashi Kōichi)
Voiced by: Nobunaga Shimazaki (Japanese); Matt Mercer (English)
A perverted high school student with Hi-ERo particles, which are used as an energy source for the robot Daimidaler. He is recruited by Kyōko Sonan to join in her battle against the Penguin Empire. Though he initially refuses, he changes his mind when he realizes that he enjoys piloting Daimidaler and fondling Kyōko. During a battle against one of the Penguin Empire's strongest robot, Kōichi is presumably killed in action while protecting Kyōko when said robot self-destructed. However, said robot's Hi-ERo particles acted like a transport device and teleported him to the Penguin Empire's original world at the last second. He was taken care of by the humans there who also repaired and modified Daimidaler. He was able to return to his own world because Daimidaler's left arm is still intact and resonated with his Hi-ERo particles. He, Kiyuna, and Shōma all go to the same school and is the couple's underclassman by one year.

Kyōko Sonan (楚南 恭子, Sonan Kyōko)
Voiced by: Yōko Hikasa (Japanese); Emily Neves (English)
The first known pilot of Daimidaler. When she discovers Kōichi having Hi-ERo particles, she recruits him to join her in her battle against the Penguin Empire. She has great hate for the Penguin Empire because her father was traumatized by them when they first arrived on Earth. She dislikes having Kōichi grope her to release his Hi-ERo particles but it is hinted that she has begun to develop feelings for him. During a battle against one of the Penguin Empire's strongest robot, Kōichi is presumably killed in action while protecting Kyōko. In episode 8, she is accidentally found by Kiriko and Shōma in a medical room recovering from said battle. She later reawakens after "hearing" Koichi's voice and launches Daimidaler's severed left arm to the battlefield which resonated with Koichi's Hi-ERo particles allowing him to return to his world.

Kiriko Kiyuna (喜友名 霧子, Kiyuna Kiriko)
Voiced by: Shizuka Ishigami (Japanese); Cherami Leigh (English)
Former Daimidaler pilot but quit after the organization she worked for was disbanded. A pure hearted girl, she is currently a high school student and began dating Shōma Ameku after he confessed to her. Like Kōichi, she also possesses Hi-ERo particles and releases them by getting excited when she experiences romantic and/or erotic moments with Shōma. Due to their constant Public display of affection, the school staff has received several complaints about them. She becomes very depressed when Shōma turns into a penguin and leaves her for the Penguin Empire but she resolves to bring him back. She is the only Daimidaler pilot who can summon the robot by remote control. She and Shōma are Kōichi's seniors, as they attend the same school. She recognizes Kōichi due to his constant wearing of a Gakuran uniform, instead of the one at school and his reputation as a pervert.

Shōma Ameku (天久 将馬, Ameku Shōma)
Voiced by: Natsuki Hanae (Japanese); Todd Haberkorn (English)
Boyfriend of Kiriko Kiyuna. He fell in love with her at first sight and later confessed to her. Initially he had no knowledge of her past but is later told about it by Kiriko herself. A pure hearted boy, he is loyal and dedicated to Kiriko despite being tempted by other women and always tries to protect her from the Penguin Empire although he is usually saved by her instead. They often engage in romantic and, sometimes, erotic activities in order for Kiriko to release her Hi-ERo particles. As a result, their school's staff has received several complaints due to their Public display of affection. In Episode 10, Shoma is transformed in a penguin and leaves Kiyuna for the Penguin Empire. Later in Episode 12, Shoma is turned back into a human thanks to Henry and returns to Kiriko.

Moriko Tomoyose (友寄 もり子, Tomoyose Moriko)
Voiced by: Ayaka Ōhashi (Japanese); Jamie Marchi (English)
One of the scientists in charge of developing and maintaining Daimidaler. She usually seen wearing a monocle and is said to be the oldest of the three scientists/professors.

Soriko Majikina (真境名 そり子, Majikina Soriko)
Voiced by: Ibuki Kido (Japanese); Tiffany Patterson (English)
One of the scientists/professors in charge of developing and maintaining Daimidaler. She is usually seen wearing a pink bunny girl suit without the bunny ears.

Sewashiko Goya (呉屋 せわし子, Goya Sewashiko)
Voiced by: Azusa Tadokoro (Japanese); Leah Clark (English)
One of the scientists/professors in charge of developing and maintaining Daimidaler. She is the smallest of the three scientists/professors having a childlike build. Her notable feature is having what appears to be a piece of cloth hanging from her nose.

Kazuo Matayoshi (又吉 一雄, Matayoshi Kazuo)
Voiced by: Takehito Koyasu (Japanese); J. Michael Tatum (English)
The leader of the organization dedicated to fighting the Penguin Empire which is based inside the Beauty Salon Prince. He becomes something of a mentor to Kōichi. He later convinces Kiriko Kiyuna to once again pilot Daimidaler with the help of her boyfriend Shōma Ameku. He is one of the few who has openly admitted to the couple that their constant Public display of affection is annoying. He is also shown to have a maniacal side to him when it comes to fighting the Penguin Empire.

=== Penguin Empire ===
An empire of humanoid penguin beings with "front tails" (tails on their groin that cause them to look like they are having an exaggerated erection) who invade and eventually take over the world. Despite their initial impression as evil invaders, they are revealed to be friendly and treat each other like family. They also managed to reduce the sales and production of erotic and suggestive media and they are also known for trying to avoid damaging the city during battle (which the Daimidaler pilots do not usually do). As a result, they are instead seen as heroes while the pilots of Daimidaler and the staff of Beauty Salon Prince are seen as menaces.

Penguin Emperor (ペンギン帝王, Pengin Teiō)
Voiced by: Hideyuki Hori (Japanese); Patrick Seitz (English)
The emperor of the Penguin Empire who seeks to conquer the Earth. He has a soft spot for Rikantz and even gave her the nickname Ritz. His plans are constantly pushed back by Kōichi and Kyōko until the former was presumably killed in battle. He later succeeds in integrating the Penguin Empire into society but now faces a new opponent in Kiriko Kiyuna.

It is revealed that the Penguin Emperor and his empire originated from a parallel world and was transported to the world when his teleportation machine malfunctioned. There he met a young Rikantz Seaberry who had lost her home and family in a war. The two would travel for a while but he eventually left her in a town after giving her some of the money he had saved during his travels. After several years of hard work, he finally managed to recreate his empire leading to the events of the story.

Rikantz Seaberry (リカンツ＝シーベリー, Rikantsu Shīberī)
Voiced by: Aya Suzaki (Japanese); Tessa Ellory (English)
A young girl who has a strong love for penguins which causes her to join forces with the Penguin Empire. Her most notable trait is her blonde hair tied in braided pigtails and she is known for wearing a white dress with a black cape, a black top hat and a cane. She is capable of hand to hand combat being able to take on the Penguin Emperor's men by herself. She is also known by her nickname Ritz which was given to her by the emperor. She is jokingly referred to as Morning Ritzness (a play on Morning Sickness during pregnancy) by her fellow Penguin soldiers when she made herself sick while piloting one of their robots whose special attack was spinning at great speeds.

Later, it is revealed that she had met the Penguin Emperor as a child after she lost her home and family during a war. They traveled for a while but he eventually left her in a town after giving her some money. Though she no longer remembers him it was this event that led to her love of penguins.

Michael (マイケル, Maikeru)
Voiced by: Taishi Murata (Japanese); Aaron Roberts (English)
One of the Penguin Commandos and one of the Penguin Emperor's finest soldiers.

Dennis (デニス, Denisu)
Voiced by: Shintarō Asanuma (Japanese); David Trosko (English)
One of the Penguin Commandos and one of the Penguin Emperor's finest soldiers.

Jake (ジェイク, Jeiku)
Voiced by: Kentarō Itō (Japanese); Jerry Jewell (English)
One of the Penguin Commandos and one of the Penguin Emperor's finest soldiers.

Jim (ジム, Jimu)
Voiced by: Makoto Yasumura (Japanese); Bradford Jackson (English)
One of the Penguin Commandos and one of the Penguin Emperor's finest soldiers.

Nelson (ネルソン, Neruson)
Voiced by: Jun Fukushima (Japanese); Sonny Strait (English)
One of the Penguin Commandos and one of the Penguin Emperor's finest soldiers.

Henry (ヘンリー, Henrī)
Voiced by: Yuichi Nakamura (Japanese); Ian Sinclair (English)
One of the Penguin Commandos and the Penguin Emperor's finest soldiers. He is the first penguin soldier to pilot a Hi-ERo penguin robot and referred to himself as Hi-ERo Penguin Commando Six but due to the similarity in pronunciation, Kōichi and several others believed he said Sex instead of Six. Constant use of Hi-ERo particles caused him to slowly take on a more handsome human appearance to the point that he was unrecognizable to anyone but it also caused him to suffer from amnesia. He later met Kyōko in a park where they quickly become acquainted. Kyōko was quite charmed by him until his memory returned and his true identity is revealed. He is presumably killed in battle against Kōichi causing him to be hailed as a hero by the Penguin Empire although he is shown to have survived and back in his penguin form.

==== Antarctic Series ====
A series of mecha used by the Penguin Empire which the Damidaler series was based on.

- Antarctic Type 8: Appears in episodes 1 and 3. Powers include flight, a pelvis beam cannon called the Tail Beam, two 9-tube missile launchers in the pectorals, and super sonic movement.
- Antarctic Type 9: Appears in episode 2. Powers include flight, body splitting armed with ten electric spikes each half, mouth rockets, arm electric bolts, and a torso energy cannon.
- Antarctic Type 10: Appears in episode 4. Powers include a Daimidaler disguise, bladed arms armed with machine guns, a pelvis anchor called the Tail Punch, and a pelvis beam cannon called the Tail Beam.
- Type 8 Ritz Custom: Appears in episodes 5 and 9. Powers include flight, a pelvis beam cannon called the Tail Beam, morphing the left hand into a drill, and a sphere particle barrier.
- Antarctic Type 11: Appears in episodes 6 and 7. Powers include a pincer claw in the neck, a ten thousand volt energy beam from the eyes called the Antarctic Beam, flight, an electric barrier, and turning into a tornado called the Penguin Aurora Spin.
- Humpbolt Kai: Appears in episodes 9, 10, 11, and 12. Powers include disguising itself as Type 8, flight, sharp claws, and a force field.

=== Civilian ===
Chieko Kakazu (嘉数 智恵子, Kakazu Chieko)
Voiced by: Ao Takahashi (Japanese); Colleen Clinkenbeard (English)
Kakazu is the guidance counselor of the school. She is a strict woman who disapproves people breaking the school's rules.

== Media ==
=== Manga ===
Written and illustrated by Asaki Nakama, Daimidaler the Sound Robot began serialization in Fellows! on December 15, 2008. Enterbrain later collected the series into four tankobon volumes, which were released from 2009 to 2012.

No.	Title	Release date	ISBN
1	Daimidaler the Sound Robot 01 (健全ロボ ダイミダラー 01)	November 16, 2009	978-4-04-726146-4
2	Daimidaler the Sound Robot 02 (健全ロボ ダイミダラー 02)	December 15, 2010	978-4-04-726969-9
3	Daimidaler the Sound Robot 03 (健全ロボ ダイミダラー 03)	January 14, 2012	978-4-04-727724-3
4	Daimidaler the Sound Robot 04 (健全ロボ ダイミダラー 04)	November 15, 2012	978-4-04-728497-5

=== Anime ===
An anime television series adaptation premiered on AT-X on from April 5, 2014, to June 21, 2014. The series was animated by TNK, produced by Kadokawa, Showgate, AT-X, Lantis and Genco and directed by Tetsuya Yanagisawa, with Takao Yoshioka acting as screenwriter. airings of the series are uncensored, while the airings on TV Kanagawa and other networks are heavily censored. The opening theme is "Kenzen Robo Daimidaler" by Endoh-kai, a new group by Masaaki Endoh. The ending theme is "Suki Suki//Links" by Ibuki Kido, Ayaka Ohashi and Azusa Tadokoro.

In North America, the series is licensed by Funimation for simulcast on their video website before releasing the series on DVD and Blu-ray with an English dub and in Australia by Madman Entertainment.
