= Magical Buffs: The Support Caster Is Stronger Than He Realized! =

Japanese light novel series

- First light novel volume cover, featuring Heidemarie (left) and Wim Strauss (right)

雑用付与術師が自分の最強に気付くまで～迷惑をかけないようにしてきましたが、追放されたので好きに生きることにしました～ (Zatsuyō Fuyojutsu-shi ga Jibun no Saikyō ni Kizuku made: Meiwaku o Kakenai Yō ni Shite Kimashitaga, Tsuihō Sareta node Suki ni Ikiru Koto ni Shimashita)
- Genre: Fantasy
- Novel series
- Written by: Haka Tokura
- Published by: Shōsetsuka ni Narō
- Original run: November 9, 2020 – present
- Light novel
- Written by: Haka Tokura
- Illustrated by: Eiri Shirai
- Published by: Futabasha
- English publisher: NA: Seven Seas Entertainment
- Imprint: M Novels
- Original run: September 30, 2021 – present
- Volumes: 4
- Manga
- Written by: Haka Tokura
- Illustrated by: Shin Arakawa
- Published by: Futabasha
- English publisher: NA: Seven Seas Entertainment
- Imprint: Monster Comics
- Magazine: Gaugau Monster
- Original run: September 23, 2021 – present
- Volumes: 12
- Anime television series
- Directed by: Hideki Okamoto
- Produced by: Ryō Aizawa
- Written by: Takao Yoshioka
- Music by: Yuki Hayashi; Luke Stanridge; Asa Taylor
- Studio: J.C.Staff
- Licensed by: Crunchyroll
- Original network: Tokyo MX, MBS, BS11
- Original run: January 2027 – scheduled
- icon

Magical Buffs: The Support Caster Is Stronger Than He Realized! (Note: Japanese: 雑用付与術師が自分の最強に気付くまで～迷惑をかけないようにしてきましたが、追放されたので好きに生きることにしました～, Hepburn: Zatsuyō Fuyojutsu-shi ga Jibun no Saikyō ni Kizuku made: Meiwaku o Kakenai Yō ni Shite Kimashitaga, Tsuihō Sareta node Suki ni Ikiru Koto ni Shimashita) is a Japanese light novel series written by Haka Tokura and illustrated by Eiri Shirai. It began serialization as a web novel published on the user-generated novel publishing website Shōsetsuka ni Narō in November 2020. It was later acquired by Futabasha who began publishing it under their M Novels light novel imprint in September 2021. A manga adaptation illustrated by Shin Arakawa began serialization on Futabasha's Gaugau Monster website in September 2021. An anime television series adaptation produced by J.C.Staff is set to premiere in January 2027.

== Synopsis ==
Wim Strauss is kicked out of his party due to being a support mage that his party deems useless in battle. After being kicked out, he gets a second chance thanks to childhood friend Heidemarie who invites him to join her party.

== Characters ==
Wim Strauss (ヴィム = シュトラウス, Vimu Shutorausu)
Voiced by: Reiji Kawashima
Heidemarie (ハイデマリー, Haidemarī)
Voiced by: Hana Hishikawa
Camilla (カミラ, Kamira)
Voiced by: Akeno Watanabe
Chronos (クロノス, Kuronosu)
Voiced by: Masaaki Mizunaka
Rita Heynckes (リタ = ハインケス, Rita Hainkesu)
Voiced by: Wakana Kuramochi
Abel (アーベル, Āberu)
Voiced by: Haruki Ishiya
Mark (マルク, Maruku)
Voiced by: Atsushi Ono
Monica (モニカ, Monika)
Voiced by: Yui Ishikawa

== Media ==
=== Light novel ===
Written by Haka Tokura, Magical Buffs: The Support Caster Is Stronger Than He Realized! began serialization as a web novel published on the user-generated novel publishing website Shōsetsuka ni Narō on November 9, 2020. It was later acquired by Futabasha who began publishing the series with illustrations by Eiri Shirai under their M Novels light novel imprint on September 30, 2021. Four volumes have been released as of June 2026. The light novels are also licensed in English by Seven Seas Entertainment.

No.	Original release date	Original ISBN	English release date	English ISBN
1	September 30, 2021	978-4-575-24399-4	January 22, 2026 (digital); February 17, 2026 (print)	979-8-89561-770-0
Chapter 1: "An Atrocious New Start"; Chapter 2: "The Nice Perch"; Chapter 3: "Nachtlibelle"; Wings Side 1; Chapter 4: "Stalker Girl"; Chapter 5: "Excitement"; Chapter 6: "A Large-Scale Survey"; Chapter 7: "Listen to Your Heart"; Chapter 8: "Puppenspieler"; Wings Side 2; Chapter 9: "Awakening"; Side story: "The Friendly Face at the Nice Perch"
2	May 30, 2023	978-4-575-24503-5	April 30, 2026 (digital); June 16, 2026 (print)	979-8-89561-771-7
Chapter 1: "Dizzying Speeds"; Wings Side 3; Chapter 2: "The Pursuers"; Chapter 3: "A New Official Member"; Wings Side 4; Chapter 4: "Minerva Achaea"; Chapter 5: "Wonderful Days"; Chapter 6: "Lacking Humanity"
3	November 30, 2023	978-4-575-24700-8	September 10, 2026 (digital); October 27, 2026 (print)	979-8-89561-772-4
Chapter 1: "Black Maps"; Chapter 2: "A Deal"; Chapter 3: "The Young Ausländer"; Chapter 4: "The Hatching Ceremony"; Wings Side 5; Chapter 5: "The Expedition Celebration"; Chapter 6: "The Pursuers 2"; Chapter 7: "His Blood Flow Slows"; Chapter 8: "I Was Too Late"; Chapter 9: "Somehow, I Need You to Be..."; Chapter 10: "Puppet Play"
4	June 30, 2026	978-4-575-24902-6	March 9, 2027 (print)	979-8-89863-976-1

=== Manga ===
A manga adaptation illustrated by Shin Arakawa began serialization on Futabasha's Gaugau Monster website on September 23, 2021. The manga's chapters have been collected into twelve tankōbon volumes as of August 2026. The manga adaptation is licensed in English by Seven Seas Entertainment.

No.	Original release date	Original ISBN	English release date	English ISBN
1	December 28, 2021	978-4-575-41342-7	October 1, 2024	979-8-89160-499-5
1. "The Worst Departure"; 2. "Village Friend"; 3. "Nachtlibelle"; 4. "Granting Magic"; 5. "Wyvern Slaying"
2	June 30, 2022	978-4-575-41445-5	January 28, 2025	979-8-89160-527-5
6. "Negotiation"; 7. "Stalker Girl"; 8. "Excitement"; 9. "Effect"; 10. "Large-Scale Labyrinth Dive"
3	December 15, 2022	978-4-575-41553-7	May 13, 2025	979-8-89160-757-6
11. "Vanguard Unit"; 12. "Attack"; 13. "Gratitude"; 14. "Boss"; 15. "Listen to Your Heart"
4	April 28, 2023	978-4-575-41634-3	September 23, 2025	979-8-89373-356-3
16. "Puppenspieler"; 17. "Form Change"; 18. "Conclusion"; 19. "Awakening"; Bonus: "Heidemarie's Memos"
5	October 30, 2023	978-4-575-41755-5	January 6, 2026	979-8-89373-674-8
20. "Guildmasters"; 21. "Discharge"; 22. "Pursuers"; 23. "Official Enrolment"; 24. "Broken Wings"
6	April 30, 2024	978-4-575-41871-2	May 19, 2026	979-8-89373-675-5
25. "Treasure Vault"; 26. "Trap"; 27. "Rita Heynckes"; 28. "Analysis Session"; 29. "Level Ninety-Nine"
7	September 13, 2024	978-4-575-41971-9	September 22, 2026	979-8-89561-379-5
30. "First Battle"; 31. "Welcome"; 32. "Wonderful Days"; 33. "Interruption"; 34. "Human Imperfection"
8	February 28, 2025	978-4-575-42093-7	January 19, 2027	979-8-89765-625-7
9	July 30, 2025	978-4-575-42203-0	May 11, 2027	979-8-89765-928-9
10	December 26, 2025	978-4-575-42318-1	—	—
11	April 30, 2026	978-4-575-42406-5	—	—
12	August 28, 2026	978-4-575-42492-8	—	—
13	December 24, 2026	978-4-575-42582-6	—	—

=== Anime ===
An anime television series adaptation was announced on March 20, 2026. The series will be produced by J.C.Staff and directed by Hideki Okamoto, with Takao Yoshioka handling series composition, Yu Murakami designing the characters, Yuki Hayashi, Luke Stanridge and Asa Taylor composing the music, and Ryō Aizawa serving as a producer. It is set to premiere on January 4, 2027, on Tokyo MX and other networks. The opening theme song is "Ecstatic Buffer", performed by Lisa. Crunchyroll will stream the series.

== Reception ==
By August 2026, the series had over 4.5 million copies in circulation.

The manga adaptation was ranked second at the 2024 Ebookjapan Manga Awards.
