= Ryosuke Nakanishi =

Japanese composer

Ryosuke Nakanishi 中西 亮輔
- Also known as: R-midwest
- Born: March 6, 1976 (age 50); Tokyo, Japan
- Genres: Classical; orchestral; J-pop; anison; Shibuya-kei
- Occupations: Composer; arranger; music producer
- Instruments: Keyboard
- Years active: 2000–present
- Labels: ApDream Group; Artus
- Website: www.studio-r.jp

Ryosuke Nakanishi (中西 亮輔, Nakanishi Ryosuke; born March 6, 1976) is a Japanese composer, arranger and music producer best known for his role on the soundtrack of several anime series and video games. His works include the musical scores for High School DxD, Kuroko's Basketball and The Devil is a Part-Timer!. He often goes by the alias R-midwest.

Nakanishi is the co-founder of the music agency ApDream Group, as well as the executive director of the music production company Artus. He is also a member of the Japan Composers and Arrangers Association (JCAA).

== Biography ==
Nakanishi was born in Tokyo, in 1976. He was born in a family of musicians, so he received music education since an early age. He began composing music for other artists in 2000. In 2004, he made his debut as a soundtrack composer with the ending theme song "Aoi Tabibito", from the anime Mars Daybreak. Since then, he has been active as a musician, having provided the music for many visual media works, mostly arranging tracks, opening themes and ending themes for anime.

== Works ==
=== Anime ===
| Year | Title | Role(s) |
|---|---|---|
| 2004 | Mars Daybreak | Ending theme song arranger |
| 2006 | Tokimeki Memorial Only Love | Ending theme song arranger |
| 2007 | Gigantic Formula | Ending theme song arranger |
| 2007 | Harukanaru Toki no Naka de 3 | Opening theme song composer |
| 2007 | Kamichama Karin | Ending theme song arranger |
| 2007 | Hidamari Sketch | Opening theme song arranger |
| 2010 | Cat Planet Cuties | Ending theme song arranger |
| 2011 | C^{3} | Ending theme song arranger |
| 2011 | Maji de Watashi ni Koi Shinasai! | Composer |
| 2012 | Cardfight!! Vanguard | Ending theme song arranger |
| 2012 | Kuroko's Basketball | Composer |
| 2012 | High School DxD | Composer |
| 2013 | Monogatari: Second Season | Ending theme song arranger |
| 2013 | Da Capo III | Composer |
| 2013 | High School DxD New | Composer |
| 2013 | The Devil is a Part-Timer! | Composer |
| 2013 | Walkure Romanze | Composer |
| 2014 | Mekakucity Actors | Composer; Insert song arranger |
| 2014 | Cardfight!! Vanguard: The Movie | Ending theme song arranger |
| 2014 | Love Live! 2nd Season | Insert song arranger |
| 2014 | Recently, My Sister Is Unusual | Composer |
| 2014 | Sakura Trick | Composer |
| 2014 | Healthy Robo Daimidaler | Composer |
| 2014 | Love Stage!! | Composer |
| 2014 | Invaders of the Rokujouma!? | Composer |
| 2015 | Show by Rock!! | Insert song arranger |
| 2015 | High School DxD Born | Composer |
| 2015 | Kamisama Minarai: Himitsu no Cocotama | Composer |
| 2016 | Cardfight!! Vanguard: G Stride Gate Edition | Ending theme song arranger |
| 2016 | Bakuon!! | Composer |
| 2017 | Kamisama Minarai: Himitsu no Cocotama the Movie | Composer |
| 2018 | High School DxD Hero | Composer |
| 2018 | Peacemaker Kurogane Part 1: Belief | Composer |
| 2018 | Peacemaker Kurogane Part 2: Friend | Composer |
| 2019 | B-PROJECT～Zecchō＊Emotion～ | Composer |
| 2021 | Full Dive: This Ultimate Next-Gen Full Dive RPG Is Even Shittier than Real Life! | Composer |
| 2022 | Cue! | Composer |
| 2022 | The Devil is a Part-Timer! Season 2 | Composer |
| 2026 | Oh Boy, Was I Wrong About Her | Composer |

=== Video games ===
| Year | Title | Role(s) |
|---|---|---|
| 2006 | Hiiro no Kakera Shintama Yorihime Densetsu -Piece of Future- | Ending theme song arranger |
| 2006 | Da Capo II | Character song composer and arranger |
| 2007 | Eternal Fantasy | Ending theme song arranger |
| 2008 | Momotaro Dentetsu | Arranger |
| 2012 | Girlfriend Music（♪） | Composer and arranger |
| 2016 | Yuukyuu no Tierblade: Lost Chronicle | Opening and ending theme song arranger |
