= High School DxD Hero =

- No. of episodes: 12

Release
- Original network: AT-X
- Original release: April 10 – July 3, 2018

Season chronology
- ← Previous; High School DxD Born

The fourth season of the High School DxD anime television series, titled High School DxD Hero, aired from April 10 to July 3, 2018, on TV Tokyo's satellite channel AT-X adapts material from the ninth and tenth volumes of the light novel and is produced by Passione, using Clip Studio Paint, directed by Yoshifumi Sueda, and written by Kenji Konuta. During production of this season Ishibumi had the Passione staff read nearly all of the light novels so that they do not miss any inaccuracies and warned them off taking any creative liberties with the material like TNK had. The opening theme for this season is titled "SWITCH" by Minami and the ending theme is titled "Motenai Kuse ni" by Tapimiru.

== Episode list ==
No. overall	No. in season	Title	Directed by	Written by	Original release date
41	0	"Holiness Behind the Gym"; Transliteration: "Taīkukan ura no Hōrī" (Japanese: 体育館裏のホーリー)	Shin Matsuo; Toru Kitahata	Kenji Konuta	April 10, 2018
After casting Asia into the Dimensional Gap, Shalba Beelzebub kills Diodora for his failures. Distraught and enraged by Asia's demise, Issei's Juggernaut Drive is activated and he engages and kills Shalba in a duel. Unable to transform back after defeating Shalba due to the incomplete state of his transformation, Issei is stuck in his Juggernaut form. Meanwhile, Vali's team arrives and brings Asia back from the Dimensional Gap, much to Xenovia's happiness. After Vali explains that music has the ability to calm a dragon's rage, Irina appears with a projection device from Odin and it plays the "Oppai Dragon Song". With the help of the song, Vali's halving abilities and Rias' breasts, they are able to restore Issei to his human form. Overjoyed by Issei's return, Rias, Akeno and Koneko embrace him as Asia's wakes up, the team then decides to return to the real world, but not before Issei collapses from exhaustion. Some time later, Issei and Asia compete in the three-legged race at Kuoh and win. After the race, Asia kisses Issei and tells him that she loves him, causing him to faint in bliss.
42	1	"That's Right, Let's Go to Kyoto"; Transliteration: "Sō sa, Kyōto ni ikou" (Japanese: そうさ、京都に行こう)	Yutaka Hirata	Kenji Konuta	April 17, 2018
Upon learning that the group's sophomores will be leaving for a two day school trip to Kyoto; Asia, Koneko, Akeno, and Rias all try to sleep with Issei. During class the next day, Koneko pulls Issei aside and requests that she perform healing sage arts to help him recover the life force that he lost as a result of activating Juggernaut Drive in his fight with Shalba Beelzebub. She even goes as far as to request that they perform "bedroom arts" to further improve his recovery, which requires its participants to have sex with one another, but is interrupted by Rias. Later on, after a dinner hosted at the Gremory family estate, Rias and Issei encounter Sairaorg, heir of the Bael family and a combatant of an upcoming Rating Game between the Bael and Gremory households. Sairaorg requests that he and Issei spar together, to which the latter agrees. In the fight, Sairaorg proves himself to be an immensely powerful opponent, managing to damage Issei's armor with his bare hands. Nevertheless, Issei is able to withstand the attacks and deliver some of his own, earning Sairaorg's praise. In an attempt to spur Issei on, Asia asks that he be allowed to touch Rias' breasts in order to "power up", which Rias begrudgingly agrees to. Though Issei is more than happy to do so, an amused Sairaorg decides to end their sparring match before he gets the chance, stating that they'll finish their fight in the Rating Game. On the day of their school trip, after having some fun with Issei on his bed, Rias sends the sophomores off on the train, and even gives Issei a goodbye kiss, stating that she'll feel much more lonely than she lets on.
43	2	"School Trip, an Abrupt Attack"; Transliteration: "Shūgakuryokō, Ikinari Shūgekidesu" (Japanese: 修学旅行、いきなり襲撃です)	Taro Kubo	Yōichi Takahashi	April 24, 2018
On the train ride to Kyoto, Issei follows Azazel's advice to inject his consciousness into his Sacred Gear so as to unlock a safer alternative to the Juggernaut Drive. After agreeing to lend Xenovia his sword after she was forced to hand her sword over to the church's alchemist, Issei and Kiba make plans for Kyoto in case something comes up. After a few attempts to make contact with the previous Red Dragon hosts, he manages to speak with Elsha, the strongest female host of the Boosted Gear. She passes him a magical box which contains the potential of the Red Dragon Emperor. Issei manages to open it, but the potential insides jumps out and disappears. Immediately afterwards, Matsuda begins to grope Motohama's chest and says he has an uncontrollable urge to grab chests. The train finally arrives at Kyoto and the group encounters another person groping chests uncontrollably, before being held back by some onlookers. At the hotel – which is owned by the Gremory family – Rossweisse and Azazel brief the class before heading to their rooms, in which Issei gets the worst one. Issei's group enjoys sightseeing at the various attractions of Kyoto. However, at Fushimi Inari-taisha, Issei is suddenly ambushed by a group of Youkai led by a young fox girl named Kunou, who demands the return of her mother Yasaka. Irina, Xenovia and Asia arrive to support him. After the four fight them off, Issei reports their encounter to Azazel and Rossweisse upon returning to the hotel. In the evening, Issei attempts to peep at the girls showering but is stopped by Rossweisse. After a brief struggle, Issei uses Dress Break on her. Back home, Rias, Akeno and Koneko, all missing Issei, have a conversation as to why he prefers Rias' breasts over the others. During a dinner hosted by Serafall, which involves the ORC and student council, she informs that she is there to forge an alliance with Kyoto's Youkai. However, their leader, a nine-tailed fox named Yasaka who is Kunou's mother, has gone missing and the Khaos Brigade is the prime suspect. After realizing this, Issei vows to protect the city of Kyoto.
44	3	"The Party of Heroes"; Transliteration: "Eiyū-sama go ikkō desu" (Japanese: 英雄さまごー行です)	Hidehiko Kadota	Yasuharu Shimuzu	May 1, 2018
After a day of training to prevent being attacked again, Issei and his friends go sightseeing around Kyoto. After sending a picture of Asia and Xenovia in front of a shrine to Rias, Akeno calls Issei telling him that Koneko noticed that the other people in the photo are disguised fox Youkai. Immediately afterward, they are met by the fox Youkai, who bring them to Kunou. After apologizing for her recklessness and detailing the investigation conducted by the Youkai to locate Yasaka, Kunou pleads with the group to help locate her, which they accept. Still missing Issei, Rias, Akeno and Koneko, begin to wonder how the team are doing in Kyoto. Back at the hotel, Asia visits Issei in his room and they end up hiding in the closet to avoid Matsuda and Motohama. Asia takes the opportunity to kiss Issei after seeing Rias kiss him the day they left, but is interrupted by Irina and Xenovia. Upon being teased by Xenovia, Asia passes out from the shock. Xenovia and Irina then both enter the closet where Xenovia and Asia (after waking up) try to have sex with Issei, but Rossweisse thwarts them. The next day, the school trip continues with a visit to Arashiyama with Kunou acting as their local guide after volunteering to do so. In the meantime, Azazel and Rossweisse are relaxing at a bar where the latter ends up drunk and depressed after a single drink. Issei's group meets up with Kiba after lunch and they go visit the Togetsukyo Bridge together. On the bridge, they are suddenly enveloped in fog and sucked into a parallel dimension. Kunou informs that this is exactly how her mother disappeared. Azazel is suddenly attacked by a beam of light as Cao Cao and his Hero Faction announce their appearance.
45	4	"Showdown! Gremory Family vs. Hero Faction in Kyoto"; Transliteration: "Kessen! Guremorī Kenzoku VS Eiyū-ha IN Kyōto" (Japanese: 決戦!グレモリー眷属VS英雄派IN京都)	Yutaka Hirata	Kenji Konuta	May 8, 2018
Cao Cao reveals that the Hero Faction, all of whom possess powerful Sacred Gears, kidnapped Yasaka, revealing that she would be the subject of a malicious experiment. He then requests that Issei and his group alongside Azazel engage in a battle against them. After using Boobylingual and Dress Break on three Hero Faction members, the team meet Siegfried, a devil purger and another member of the Hero Faction, who has three arms for each of his legendary swords. While fighting Azazel, Cao Cao reveals his motives: Wanting to determine how far humans can go fighting other supernatural races. As their battle continues, Issei's team are aided by a mysterious yet cheerful witch named Le Fay Pendragon, Arthur's sister and another member of Vali's team, who ends up destroying part of the bridge and a heavily intoxicated Rossweisse, who indiscriminately attacks Cao Cao and his group to no effect before she passes out. The Hero Faction flee and begin their preparations for their experiment, which Cao Cao states will take place at Nijō Castle that night. Some time later, the Sitri and Gremory households head out after formulating a battle plan. Meanwhile, after fighting off an Old Satan Faction attack in the Underworld, Rias has an uneasy feeling about Issei and the group. Before leaving, Azazel gifts Issei with a mysterious red orb that he found after subduing a molester outside the hotel. Ddraig identifies the orb as the potential that Issei received from Elsha earlier, but cannot identify exactly what it is or what it will do. On their way to Nijō Castle, Kunou joins their team despite having been ordered to stay behind. A few moments later, Issei and Kunou are pulled into a separate dimension by another member of the Hero Faction – one who possesses a Sacred Gear that allows the user to manipulate shadows. Issei dons his Balance Breaker, but fails to land any blows against his opponent's Balance Breaker, who in turn immobilizes him and prepares to deal a killing blow.
46	5	"My Potential Released!"; Transliteration: "Kanōsei ga Tokihanata remasu!" (Japanese: 可能性が解き放たれます!)	Taro Kubo	Yōichi Takahashi	May 15, 2018
As Issei and the Hero Faction member battle, Issei discovers that he is weak to fire and severely damages him using Dragon's Fire. The faction member reveals that his loyalty for Cao Cao stems from him making his life better, despite Issei saying that Cao Cao is just using him, he doesn't listen and attempts to attack Issei, who defeats him with a single punch. Finally reuniting with his friends at Nijō Castle, they find Yasaka, but she doesn't seem to recognize Kunou before transforming into an extremely powerful nine-tailed fox. The Hero Faction then reveal their plan to lure Great Red into the human dimension by combining Kyoto's chi and the Youkai's power and kill it after being branded a nuisance by Orphis. Xenovia uses her modified Durandal, now named Ex-Durandal, which was fused with Excalibur via Alchemy to kill the Hero Faction, which obliterates the castle and part of the city but fails to kill the Hero Faction. Georg starts the experiment, which combines several forms of magic and Yasaka's power to lure Great Red. The Hero Faction then pick what members of the team they want to fight. Saji, in his Dragon King form called Vritra Promotion, handles Yasaka, while Kunou and Asia take care of each other on Issei's orders. Back home, Rias shows off her new lingerie she bought to impress Issei when he gets back. Back in Kyoto, Kiba and Xenovia fight Siegfried who shows off his Balance Breaker: Giving him three extra arms and six swords; Irina fights Jeanne, whose Balance Breaker is a dragon made out of Holy Swords; Rossweisse fights Heracles, whose Balance Breaker fires missiles out of his arms; while Issei and Cao Cao fight without Cao Cao showing off his Balance Breaker. Despite severing Cao Cao's left arm with Ascalon, Cao Cao uses Phoenix Tears to heal himself. Cao Cao's teammates arrive, each carrying unconscious members of Issei's team. Heeding Elsha and Azazel's advice telling him to embrace his identity despite his flaws, Issei releases his potential, which projects shadows of the people of Kyoto the orb managed to possess. The shadows form a summon circle, where Issei summons a sleeping Rias into the battle.
47	6	"The School Trip is in Pandemonium"; Transliteration: "Shūgakuryokō wa Pandemoniumu" (Japanese: 修学旅行はパンデモニウム)	Mihiro Yamaguchi	Yasuharu Shimuzu	May 22, 2018
After summoning Rias to Kyoto, Issei uses Rias' nipples as a switch to unleash his full potential and transports her back home. Elsha and Belzard – the strongest male host of the Red Dragon Emperor – inform Issei that they are leaving for good, but give him some words of encouragement before doing so. Issei uses his new power, named Illegal Move Triaina, to attack Cao Cao, who barely manages to defend with his spear. However, Issei, not adapted to his new power, severely drains his stamina and abilities, so he is unable to keep up. Suddenly, Sun Wukong and his dragon Yu Long appear through a gap in the mist. While Yu Long assists Saji with Yasaka, Sun Wukong easily overpowers the Hero Faction which forces them to flee. Issei launches one final attack at the retreating Cao Cao, which takes out his right eye. Cao Cao vows revenge on Issei and tells him to get stronger before fleeing. After exhausting Yasaka, she falls unconscious despite the spell being lifted. With Sun Wukong's help, Issei uses Boobylingual and helps Yasaka turn back to normal and regain consciousness. The next day, Yasaka expresses her thanks to Issei's group and bids them farewell at the train station. Kunou also requests that Issei come back to Kyoto soon to visit, which he promises to do. After returning home, Issei apologizes for not keeping Rias and the rest of the group updated on the events in Kyoto. Azazel informs him that the school festival is coming up and that Ravel Phoenix would be transferring to Kuoh Academy soon as a first year student, although Koneko is not pleased with this development. Rias also informs the group that they have to prepare for their Rating Game with Sairaorg Bael. While training, Seekvaira Agares informs Sairaorg that Issei has gained new powers but instead of being daunted by it, Sairaorg is pleased to hear that Issei has gotten stronger.
48	7	"We are Preparing for the School Festival!"; Transliteration: "Gakuen-sai no Junbi desu!" (Japanese: 学園祭の準備です！)	Saori Tachibana; Masaru Kawashima	Kenji Konuta	May 29, 2018
While appearing on an Underworld kid's show depicting Issei saving Rias, Irina asks Issei to zip up her dress, after she volunteered to fill in for the narrator after being injured. Falling in an awkward position after her dress ripped, Irina expresses her desire to have sex with Issei and bear his child before being interrupted by Xenovia, Asia, Akeno and Koneko, who also try to have sex with him until Rias forces them out. Later, Issei hears one of his fans upset about not being able to meet him after tickets for both meeting events sold out. Issei goes to the boy, who introduces himself to him and autographs his cap, but his manager warns him not to do that again as the studio can't handle a mass of fans. Witnessing his good deed, Rias reminds about how special it was for the fan. Venelana and Millicas then greet the two and tell them about how popular the show is while Venelana expresses concern as to why Issei addresses Rias as "president" and not her name, but Issei says that he will still protect Rias with his life, although neither he nor Rias can explain their personal feelings for each other out to fear. At school, Rias and Issei encounter Ravel trying to get accustomed to school life. Noticing her inexperience around the other students, they ask Koneko to be Ravel's friend. She nonchalantly agrees, although they immediately start insulting each other. They also try to get Gasper to be her friend as well but is too afraid to. For the festival, the ORC's job is turning the old school building into a mansion based around the occult. Kiba asks Issei if he's thought about the Rating Game, who offers to train with him after revealing that he has been theorizing ways to beat Sairaorg. Azazel arrives and speaks to Ddraig about finding a Councillor, having been depressed since Kyoto because of Issei's perverted nature. Rias and Issei are requested to a medical facility in the Sitri domain by Sairaorg's butler without his knowledge where they meet Misla Bael, Sairaorg's mother and Rias' aunt. Rias explains that, unlike the rest of the family, Sairaorg wasn't born with demonic powers; blaming his wife, Sairaorg's father forced his wife and son into exile. Despite this, Misla tried to give her son the best life possible until she fell sick with demonic illness, a rare and potentially fatal disease that only affects Devils. The butler requests that Issei use Boobylingual to awaken her, but fails, even with his Balance Breaker. Sairaorg arrives and thanks them for their help, despite failing to cure Misla. Issei and Sairaorg then tell each other that they won't go easy on them when the Rating Game arrives, but promises nothing personal. During the car ride home, Rias nearly mentally tells herself her true feelings for Issei.
49	8	"A Girl's Heart is Complicated"; Transliteration: "Otome Kokoro wa Fukuzatsu desu" (Japanese: 乙女心は複雑です)	Takahiro Majima	Yōichi Takahashi	June 5, 2018
While training for the Rating Game, Ravel, having overheard Issei's conversation with Kiba, suggests transferring a cannon blast instead of going full on with it, telling them that it's more effective for the team's safety and chances of winning. However, Rias tells them about certain rules approved by the higher ups which may hinder that from happening. The next day, Saji announces that the Sitri house has a Rating Game the same day as the Gremory house before they head to a televised press conference about the upcoming fight. When the reporters ask Issei questions about his obsession with Rias' breasts, to her embarrassment, he struggles to answer. So Sairaorg suggests that he'll become even stronger if he sucks on them, shocking everyone. After the conference, Sairaorg appreciates Issei's confidence before leaving. Back home in the sauna, Rias flirts with Issei and asks him what she is to him on a personal level. The two share a passionate makeout session and almost have sex until Issei calls her "president" instead of her name, greatly upsetting her. The next day, Gasper says Koneko and Ravel have started to bond, if only slightly, and Azazel tells him about how jealousy can bring out the worst in people, especially females. Issei also gives Gasper some male advice, boosting his confidence. Azazel reveals that he has been appointed the Gremory house's adviser for the Rating Game, while Sairaorg has Diehauser Belial, the head of the Belial house and a long-standing Rating Game champion. Azazel shows them who they're facing while Rias goes over their battle tactics and countermeasures. While still preparing for the festival, Ravel's mother appears as a hologram to check up on Ravel adapting to her new school and tells Issei to protect her from the evils of the human world, which he agrees to, stunning Ravel, while also reminding him that she's available. When a shocked Rias walks away, she asks Issei if he'll protect her and the others too, replying that he'll die for her along with the others. Rias again asks what she is to him personally, but when he calls her "president" yet again, she runs away crying. Asia runs after her, leaving a confused Issei behind. Oblivious to what he did wrong, the group scolds Issei, criticizing him for not understanding Rias' feelings and Akeno stops him from going after her, stating he will only make things worse for her the way he is. Issei, hurt by their words and unable to defend himself, is left to ponder over what he's done.
50	9	"The Deciding Battle of the Strongest Youth, Begins!"; Transliteration: "Wakate Saikyō Kettei-sen, Kaishi desu!" (Japanese: 若手最強決定戦、開始です！)	Yoshio Suzuki; Kotaro Kurosugi	Yasuharu Shimuzu	June 12, 2018
After realizing that Issei is unable to understand Rias's feelings because he's still traumatized by Raynare's betrayal and with that, Akeno, Koneko and Asia successfully help him regain his self-confidence by healing his broken heart, force him to face his trauma and confess their love for him, stating they will never betray him, that he should start believing in himself and Raynare is erased from his heart forever. As the day of the Rating Game arrives, they encounter Hades and Riser, the latter of which telling Rias to believe in the group as she is the reason they are all together in the first place. He also wishes Issei luck and tells him to watch over Ravel. Sirzechs requests to meet Issei, who shows him a video of his fans cheering him on as well as letters sent to him, telling him to fight for their and his dreams. As the Rating Game begins, the rules are explained: Each king will roll a die, with the accumulated total of both dies deciding the members of the match based on their evil piece level. Pawns are worth 1, knights and bishops are worth 3, rooks are worth 5 and queens are worth 9 points; the point system is also applied to family members, using Issei as an example who sits on eight points because of his eight pieces. The teams are then given five minutes to select their participant and both teams will only have one vial of Phoenix Tears to use anytime. After a total of three, a bishop or knight can only be used for the first round. Kiba is eventually chosen to go out for Rias' team, while Sairaorg has also chosen a knight named Beruka Furcas.
51	10	"As a Family Member of Rias Gremory"; Transliteration: "Riasu Guremorī no Kenzoku to shite" (Japanese: リアス・グレモリーの眷属として)	Taro Kubo	Yasuharu Shimuzu	June 19, 2018
Using his Balance Breaker, Kiba defeats Furcas in the first round, earning the Gremory team the victory. Rolling the dice, they are accumulated to ten, where Rossweisse and Koneko are sent out together, facing a knight named Liban Crocell and a rook named Gandoma Balam. Crocell uses his Sacred Gear to increase the gravity around Rossweisse, rendering her immobile. Despite that, Rossweisse is able to free herself by teleporting Gandoma in her place. Although she releases a powerful attack, Liban survives and traps both girls in his gravitational field. Gandoma, who also survived, emerges from the ground and crushes Koneko. Although Rossweisse eventually wins, the Gremory house loses their first piece, and Issei vows to hold onto his anger for when his time comes. The total comes to eight and Sairaorg publicly chooses his bishop, Coriana Andrealphus, while Issei goes out after Sairaorg reveals he chose Coriana specifically to fight Issei. Coriana attempts to distract Issei by stripping for him, but he wins after she tries to take off her panties first, which according to Issei, breaks the rules of stripping. The total is once again added to eight, but because Issei cannot be sent out again, Xenovia and Gasper – wanting to avenge Koneko – volunteer to go out, where they face a rook named Ladora Bune and a bishop named Misteeta Sabnock. Sabnock uses a Sacred Gear which nullifies Xenovia's powers, in response, Gasper attempts to remove the curse by pouring Issei's blood in a magic circle and goes out to fight to buy her some time. Despite being thrashed around by Ladora, Gasper uses Issei's advice and loyalty to the Gremory household to withstand the attacks, eventually buying enough time for Xenovia to recover and obliterate Sabnock and Bune, although Gasper sacrifices himself in the process. With seven members left on the Gremory team and only three left on Sairaorg's, the total is added to nine and Akeno, being the queen, volunteers to go out, where she faces Sairaorg's queen, Kuisha Abaddon. The fight ends with Akeno's defeat due to Abaddon's ability to absorb opposing attacks and redirect them to wherever she wishes. With the next total being 12, Sairaorg goes out to fight Kiba, Xenovia and Rossweisse, who volunteered in Issei's place in an attempt to wear Sairaorg down.
52	11	"Man against Man"; Transliteration: "life.MAX vs power.MAX『Otoko tai Otoko』" (Japanese: life.MAX VS power.MAX『赤龍帝 対 獅子王』)	Mihiro Yamaguchi	Yōichi Takahashi	June 26, 2018
On the battlefield, Sairaorg takes off his constraints, causing his fighting aura to significantly increase. He takes down Rossweisse with a single punch, although it's later revealed to be a perfectly planned ruse, the Rossweisse that Sairaorg knocked out of the arena was a mimic created by an Excalibur sword which she borrowed from Xenovia; falling into the water was also part of her plan. However, the real Rossweisse is eliminated by Sairaorg shortly after. Although Kiba and Xenovia manage to sever Sairaorg's right arm, they are defeated when he overpowers and eliminates them, then is forced to use the Phoenix Tears to repair his arm. After the total adds to nine, Issei is sent out to fight Kuisha. Issei, angered at the demise of six of his friends and wanting to avenge Akeno, uses his Balance Breaker to eliminate Kuisha instantaneously, which stuns both Asia and Rias, although Azazel discovers that Sairaorg eliminated Kuisha himself, knowing that Issei's attack would've killed her anyway. Sairaorg proposes that they drop the rules and skip to the grand finale so he and his remaining pawn Regulus can fight the remaining members of Gremory house, Rias agrees to the conditions and Issei vows to take Sairaorg down as he wouldn't be able to face his friends otherwise. Starting the battle, Issei and Sairaorg start throwing punches, but Issei boosts his ability to inflict more damage onto Sairaorg, while Rias watches as Regulus turns into a golden Nemean lion, one of the 13 legendary longinuses, whose master was murdered and found by Sairaorg after Regulus destroyed his master's killers. Issei and Sairaorg continue to trade blow for blow, where Issei discovers that his right arm punches are slower and less damaging then the left thanks to Kiba and Xenovia severing it, giving him an advantage. Unfortunately for Rias, she has become too weak from blood loss caused by Regulus to have an advantage over him, so Issei pours the Phoenix Tears onto her to ensure she survives. At Regulus and Issei's suggestion, Sairaorg uses Regulus' power to transform into his Balance Breaker, Regulus Rey Leather Rex. Sairaorg and Issei fight once again, with Sairaorg immediately getting the upper hand. Although he is reluctant, Issei knows that he has to use the Juggernaut Drive if he wants to have any chance or defeating Sairaorg. While arguing, one of Albion's former hosts interrupts them and reminds Issei of when he inserted Albion's gem into his Boosted Gear and aids him by combining both Red and White Dragon abilities together. In addition to this, with the assistance of his friends, fans, his love for Rias and his dreams, Issei's upgrades his Scale Mail armor into its queen form.
53	12	"Lion Heart of the School Festival"; Transliteration: "life.MAXIMUM VS power.MAXIMUM『Gakuen-sai no Raion Hāto』" (Japanese: life.MAXIMUM VS power.MAXIMUM『学園祭のライオンハート』)	Masayuki Yamada	Kenji Konuta	July 3, 2018
After activating the form, called Cardinal Crimson Promotion due to the color of the armor, remembering his promise to Sirzechs to fight for his and the children's dreams as well as the dreams of the Gremory family, Issei publicly confesses his love for Rias before he and Sairaorg engage in a fistfight duel, exchanging blow for blow. Although Ddraig reminds him that he has hardly had time to adjust to his new form, Issei fights through it and manages to overpower Sairaorg. Despite Sairaorg's impressive willpower, Issei uses his Crimson Blaster and severely damages Sairaorg, but he manages to get up again thanks to his vision: A world where skill and hard work is valued instead of abilities. Sairaorg and Issei once again trade blows and although he has newfound respect for Sairaorg, Issei continues to keep fighting to defeat a man like him. Physically drained, Issei loses his armor, but Regulus says that Sairaorg has lost consciousness, though he enjoyed the chance to fight Issei even if it meant putting his dream on the line to do it. Realizing Sairaorg's nobility, Issei embraces Sairaorg before he is eliminated. After winning the Rating Game, Issei and Sairaorg are taken to a hospital, where they say it was the best battle they've ever had before Sirzechs arrives to tell them that the higher ups are so satisfied with the results, that the general populace expects great things from them both. He also tells Issei about a plan to promote Issei to a mid-ranking Devil, along with Kiba and Akeno. Sairaorg then encourages Issei to confess his love for to Rias in private from the bottom of his heart so that she'll know that he's not lying about his feelings, promising that if things go south, he'll be there for him. In the aftermath, the festival takes place and Azazel informs him that although Sairaorg's backers have pulled their support from him, his popularity and power have remained largely the same, he also tells Issei to focus on his own problems like expanding his queen form. That night, while alone with Rias, Issei finally calls her by her name and professes that he's been in love with her since they met. Crying tears of joy, Rias says she's waited to hear him say her name for a long time and also tells him that she loves him more than anyone else. With their feelings now confirmed, they almost kiss, only to get interrupted by their friends, who were eavesdropping. Although they're happy for them, the girls say it won't stop them from trying to seduce Issei. After they leave, Issei and Rias share their first kiss as a couple. In the Underworld, Azazel and Sairaorg are talking about how Issei confessed to Rias and how happy they are together. Sairaorg's mother regains consciousness and tells him about how proud she is of him and that they finally get to go home together, although Azazel is convinced that Issei had a hand in it. Azazel recalls when he confronted Indra over his association with Cao Cao. Indra replies by saying he's known Cao Cao since he was young as well as his alliance with Hades, but chose to keep it secret from everyone. Azazel chooses to ignore it for now and walks off.
