= Miyama-Zero =

Japanese illustrator

Miyama-Zero (みやま零) is the pen name of a Japanese illustrator and artist. Their gender is unknown.

== Career ==
Originally illustrating eroge, Miyama-Zero has since moved on to illustrating light novels and card games, such as Lycèe. They also work under the doujinshi circle name "Stray Moon" (written in English) in which they publish erotic doujinshi. When working as an eroge scenario writer, they operate under the name Mayaseromi (まやせろみ).

== Notable works ==
- High School DxD – a light novel series that was adapted into an anime; chief illustrator
- The Ambition of Oda Nobuna – a light novel series that was adapted into an anime; chief illustrator
- 13cm and Purple software – eroge brands; illustrator for several of their games, such as Princess Bride and Nekonade Distortion
