= Takao Yamauchi =

Japanese footballer

Takao Yamauchi 山内 貴雄
Personal information
- Full name: Takao Yamauchi
- Date of birth: September 4, 1978 (age 48)
- Place of birth: Hyogo, Japan
- Height: 1.75 m (5 ft 9 in)
- Position: Defender

Youth career
- 1994–1996: Kwansei Gakuin High School
- 1997–2000: Kwansei Gakuin University

Senior career*
Years	Team	Apps	(Gls)
2001–2002	Cerezo Osaka	28	(1)
Total		28	(1)
Medal record
Cerezo Osaka
Runner-up	Emperor's Cup	2001
- * Club domestic league appearances and goals

Takao Yamauchi (山内 貴雄, Yamauchi Takao; born September 4, 1978) is a former Japanese football player.

== Playing career ==
Yamauchi was born in Hyogo Prefecture on September 4, 1978. After graduating from Kwansei Gakuin University, he joined J1 League club Cerezo Osaka in 2001. He played many matches as side back from first season. However the club finished at bottom place and was relegated to J2 League. In 2002 season, his opportunity to play decreased and he retired at the end of the 2002 season.

== Career statistics ==
Appearances and goals by club, season and competition
Club	Season	League			Emperor's Cup		J.League Cup		Total	
Club	Season	Division	Apps	Goals	Apps	Goals	Apps	Goals	Apps	Goals
Cerezo Osaka	2001	J1 League	20	0	2	0	2	0	24	0
Cerezo Osaka	2002	J2 League	8	1	0	0	—		8	1
Career total			28	1	2	0	2	0	32	1
