= Takao Kitabata =

Takao Kitabata (北畑隆生) was the Vice Minister of Economy, Trade and Industry of Japan.

== Iran-Japan relations ==
On September 1, 2006, Kitabata said that if economic sanctions were imposed against Iran over its nuclear program, Japan would "have enough oil reserves" "unlike in the past two oil crises... I believe we can deal with it without major trouble. We have a fully prepared system for oil." However, a week earlier the Yomiuri Shimbun newspaper reported that the Japanese government was pushing for U.N. sanctions that did not directly affect the energy industry.

Japan relies on the Middle East for most of its petroleum and imports 15 percent of its total oil consumption from Iran. The Japanese Trade Ministry says it has a stockpile of 168 days' worth of petroleum stored by the Japanese government and private companies.

The Japanese government signed a two-billion-dollar contract to develop Azadegan, the largest onshore oil field in Iran, in 2004. Iranian officials complained that progress on the project has been too slow.

== Chuxiao gas field dispute ==
Kitabata announced on August 7 that Japan was again requesting information from the China National Offshore Oil Corporation (CNOOC), asking whether CNOOC had begun developing the disputed Chunxiao gas field in the East China Sea. Chief Cabinet Secretary Shinzo Abe first asked the Chinese government on August 4. CNOOC said on its website that Zhang Guobao, vice chairman of China's National Development and Reform Commission, inspected Chunxiao on July 24 and said that full-scale development and production had begun. Japan repeated demands that a Chinese consortium including CNOOC end development and production of Chunxiao and give Japan data on the gas project. The Chinese government said it would "urgently" verify whether production had begun. Kitabata claimed that China's only response was removing the news from CNOOC's website.

== On shareholder rights in Japan ==
On January 24, 2008, Kitabata issued the following statement at a lecture:

"To be blunt, shareholders in general do not have the ability to run a company, and they are fickle and irresponsible.They only take on a limited responsibility, but they greedily demand high dividend payments.".

This was another very prominent example of low regard for business owners in Japan.

== See also ==
- Foreign relations between China and Japan
