= Japanese ship Takao =

Several ships have been named Takao (高雄):

- Japanese steam warship Takao, also called Kaiten No.2, a ship of the Tokugawa shogunate Navy in the Boshin War
- Japanese warship Takao Maru (1874), a transport ship of the early Imperial Japanese Navy
- Japanese cruiser Takao (1888), an unprotected cruiser in the early Imperial Japanese Navy
- Japanese battlecruiser Takao, a projected Amagi-class battlecruiser of the Imperial Japanese Navy that was canceled under the terms of the Washington Naval Treaty
- Japanese cruiser Takao (1930), lead ship of the Takao class of heavy cruisers in the Imperial Japanese Navy during World War II
- Japanese minesweeper Takao Maru, an auxiliary minesweeper of the Imperial Japanese Navy in World War II
- Japanese submarine chaser Takao Maru, an auxiliary submarine chaser of the Imperial Japanese Navy in World War II
- SS Takao Maru (1927), a transport ship of the Imperial Japanese Army in World War II

== See also ==
- Takao (disambiguation)
