= Takao Station =

Takao Station (高尾駅) is the name of two railway stations in Japan:

- Takao Station (Gifu)
- Takao Station (Tokyo)

== See also ==
- Kaohsiung Main Station, named "Takao" (高雄) in Taiwan under Japanese rule
