= Larval Stage Planning =

Japanese J-pop group

- Genres: J-Pop, Synthpop
- Years active: 2010–2019
- Labels: Lantis; Fuctory Records
- Members: Airi Kirishima; Nami Maisaki; Rin Asami
- Website: ive.mu/lsp/

Larval Stage Planning (ラーバル ステージ プランニング) was a Japanese J-pop group formed in 2010 and signed to Lantis. The group was also a member of the Sapporo-based music production group I've Sound.

== History ==
=== Members ===
The group was formed by veteran singer and then-I've Sound vocalist Eiko Shimamiya, who also served as their vocal coach, in 2010. The first of the group to debut was Airi Kirishima, in the middle of 2009, when it was announced that she would perform the song "Two heaRt", the opening song of the game "Futa-Ane". The song was written by Maiko Iuchi of I've Sound and the lyrics were written by Kotoko. Since then, she performed another solo song titled "Kizuna-Endless days". The song was included in Extract, I've Sound's 7th compilation album.

In 2010, the second Larval Stage Planning member, Nami Maisaki, debuted. Her first song was "Piece of My Heart", which was an insert song used in the eroge Koi to Senkyo to Chocolate. The lyrics were written by Mami Kawada and was composed by Tomoyuki Nakazawa. The last member, Rin Asami, was previously a model signed to the agency Realize, and wanted to become a voice actress, but decided to take up singing instead. In 2011, she released her debut solo song, "Lead to the smile", which was written by Kawada and was the opening theme of the visual novel Toraba. In November of the same year, it was announced that she would be the first among the group to release a single. The single, titled "Got it!", was released at Comiket 2011.

=== Group ===
Larval Stage Planning was first announced in 2010, when it was announced that they would perform the opening theme of the game Kisagari gold star titled "Rolling Star" (Rolling Star☆彡). The song, along with the game's ending theme titled "Send-off (Namidairo no Start Line)" were released in a single on July 18, 2010. In 2011, they made their debut with Lantis. Their first single was "Kimi+Nazo+Watashi de Jump!!" (君+謎+私でJUMP!!), which was used as the opening theme of the second season of the anime Baka and Test. Their second single, "Trip (innocent of D)", was released on January 25, 2012. The song was used as the opening theme of the anime High School DxD. Their third single "Sympathy" was released on July 17, 2013; the song was used as the first opening theme of the anime High School DxD New. Their fourth single "Stargazer" was released on October 29, 2014; the song is used as the opening theme to the 2014 anime series Celestial Method.

=== Disbandment ===
Larval Stage Planning became a solo project in April 2014 after the departure of Asami Rin and Maisaki Nami with Kirishima Airi as the only member. The group officially disbanded with the departure of Kirishima Airi from I've sound in July 2019.

== Members ==
- Airi Kirishima (桐島愛里, Kirishima Airi; born November 6, 1989)
- Nami Maisaki (舞崎なみ, Maisaki Nami; born September 8, 1990)
- Rin Asami (朝見凛, Asami Rin; born September 17, 1990)

== Discography ==
=== Albums ===
Year	Album details	Peak Oricon chart positions
2013	LSP: Released: November 6, 2013; Label: Lantis (LACA-15354); Format: CD	165

=== Singles ===
Year	Song	Peak Oricon chart positions	Album
2010	"Rolling Star"	—	LSP
2011	"Kimi+Nazo+Watashi de Jump!!"	48	LSP
2012	"Trip (Innocent of D)"	32	LSP
2013	"Sympathy"	31	LSP
2014	"Stargazer"	33	
"—" denotes releases that did not chart.

=== Other songs ===
- "Rolling Star", from Level Octave (2010)
- "Send-off (Namidairo no Start Line)", from Short circuit II (2010)
- "Seishun Rocket", Short circuit III premium show (with Kotoko and Kaori Utatsuki) (2010)
- "Short Circuit", Short circuit III premium show (with Kotoko and Kaori Utatsuki) (2010)
- "Blossomdays", Tribal Link version (June 5, 2011)
- "Lillies Line", Tribal Link version (June 5, 2011)
- "Baby☆Seven Flight colors", from Kamidere (2012)
- "find a piece", from Karumaruka Circle (2013)
- "Hanabira to Ribbon", from Majo Koi Nikki (2014)
- "Honey Trap Awful Heaven", from Koi no Honey Trap ~Ecchi de Amai Honey Trap~ (2016)
