= Takao Yoshioka =

Japanese screenwriter

- 吉岡たかを
- Other names: Yoshio Takaoka, Taro Ippatsu
- Occupation: Anime screenwriter
- Years active: 1994–present
- Notable work: Elfen Lied, Your Lie in April, High School DxD, Horimiya, The Seven Deadly Sins: Revival of The Commandments

Takao Yoshioka (Japanese: 吉岡たかを, Hepburn: Yoshioka Takao) is a Japanese anime screenwriter. After leaving Shin-Ei Animation, he debuted as a screenwriter with Happy Lesson. Since Happy Lesson, he has been in charge of screenwriting for many series, some of which are Elfen Lied, Your Lie in April, High School DxD, Horimiya, and The Seven Deadly Sins: Revival of The Commandments.

== Biography ==
The first series Yoshioka worked on was Elf-ban Kakyūsei. He later worked at Shin-Ei Animation for some time, but later left and became a freelancer. After going freelance, the first series he was in charge of screenwriting was Happy Lesson. Since Happy Lesson, Yoshioka has been in charge of screenwriting for many other series.

== Works ==
- Happy Lesson (2001) (screenwriter)
- Ikki Tousen (2003) (screenwriter)
- Elfen Lied (2004) (screenwriter)
- Sekirei (2008) (screenwriter)
- Demon King Daimao (2010) (screenwriter)
- Working!!' (2011–2016) (screenwriter)
- Senran Kagura (2012) (screenwriter)
- High School DxD (2012–2015) (screenwriter)
- No Matter How I Look at It, It's You Guys' Fault I'm Not Popular! (2013) (screenwriter)
- Daimidaler: Prince vs Penguin Empire (2014) (screenwriter)
- Bladedance of Elementalers (2014) (screenwriter)
- Your Lie in April (2014–2015) (screenwriter)
- The Testament of Sister New Devil (2015) (screenwriter)
- The Morose Mononokean (2016–2019) (screenwriter)
- Magical Girl Raising Project (2016) (screenwriter)
- Interviews with Monster Girls (2017) (screenwriter)
- Schoolgirl Strikers (2017) (screenwriter)
- Konohana Kitan (2017) (screenwriter)
- The Seven Deadly Sins: Revival of The Commandments (2018) (screenwriter)
- Seven Senses of the Reunion (2018) (screenwriter)
- Boarding School Juliet (2018) (screenwriter)
- If It's for My Daughter, I'd Even Defeat a Demon Lord (2019) (screenwriter)
- I'm Standing on a Million Lives (2020–2021) (screenwriter)
- Horimiya (2021) (screenwriter)
- Aharen-san Is Indecipherable (2022–2025) (screenwriter)
- Horimiya: The Missing Pieces (2023) (screenwriter)
- 2.5 Dimensional Seduction (2024) (screenwriter)
- Hana-Kimi (2026) (screenwriter)
- Magical Girl Raising Project: Restart (2026) (screenwriter)
- Magical Buffs: The Support Caster Is Stronger Than He Realized! (2027) (screenwriter)
