= High School DxD =

Japanese light novel series and its adaptations

- First light novel volume cover, featuring (from left to right) Asia Argento, Issei Hyodo, and Rias Gremory

ハイスクールD×D (Haisukūru Dī Dī)
- Genre: Comedy; Harem; Supernatural
- Light novel
- Written by: Ichiei Ishibumi
- Illustrated by: Miyama-Zero
- Published by: Fujimi Shobo
- English publisher: NA: Yen Press
- Imprint: Fujimi Fantasia Bunko
- Magazine: Dragon Magazine
- Original run: September 20, 2008 – March 20, 2018
- Volumes: 25 (Note: + 4 short story collections: DX.1 to DX.4, + 3 spin-offs: EX, Zero, Harem King Memorial)
Further information
Manga
Written by	Hiroji Mishima
Published by	Fujimi Shobo
English publisher	NA: Yen Press
Magazine	Dragon Magazine (chapters 1–3); Monthly Dragon Age (regular serialization)
Original run	July 20, 2010 – February 9, 2019
Volumes	11
Manga
High School DxD: Asia and Koneko's Secret Contracts!?
Written by	Hiroichi
Published by	Fujimi Shobo
English publisher	NA: Yen Press
Magazine	Monthly Dragon Age
Original run	September 9, 2011 – March 9, 2019
Volumes	1
Anime television series
Directed by	Tetsuya Yanagisawa
Produced by	Hisato Usui; Jun Hatano; Shigeru Saitō; Shinsaku Tanaka; Takurō Hatakeyama; Tetsuya Tsuchihashi
Written by	Takao Yoshioka
Music by	Ryōsuke Nakanishi
Studio	TNK
Licensed by	Crunchyroll (Note: In North America through Crunchyroll (formerly known as Funimation), in the United Kingdom through Crunchyroll UK and Ireland (formerly known as Manga Entertainment) and in Australia through Madman Anime.)
Original network	AT-X (uncensored); tvk, CTC, TVA, SUN, Tokyo MX, BS11 (censored)
English network	US: Funimation Channel
Original run	January 6, 2012 – March 21, 2012
Episodes	12 + 6 Specials
Original animation DVD
Directed by	Tetsuya Yanagisawa
Produced by	Jun Hatano
Written by	Takao Yoshioka
Music by	Ryōsuke Nakanishi
Studio	TNK
Released	September 6, 2012 – May 31, 2013
Runtime	24 minutes
Episodes	2
Manga
High School DxD: The Work of a Devil
Written by	SODA
Published by	Fujimi Shobo
Magazine	Monthly Dragon Age, Age Premium
Original run	April 9, 2013 – August 9, 2013
Volumes	1
Anime television series
High School DxD New
Directed by	Tetsuya Yanagisawa
Produced by	Hisato Usui; Jun Hatano; Shigeru Saitō; Takurō Hatakeyama; Tetsuya Tsuchihashi; Kōichi Kokago; Kozue Kananiwa; Shō Tanaka
Written by	Takao Yoshioka
Music by	Ryōsuke Nakanishi
Studio	TNK
Licensed by	Crunchyroll
Original network	AT-X (uncensored); CTC, Tokyo MX, SUN, TVA, BS11 (censored)
Original run	July 7, 2013 – September 22, 2013
Episodes	12
Video game
Developer	Kadokawa Games
Publisher	Konami Examu Games inc.
Genre	Visual novel
Platform	Nintendo 3DS
Released	JP: December 19, 2013
Video game
High School DxD New Fight
Publisher	Marvelous AQL
Genre	Role-playing game
Platform	PlayStation Vita
Released	JP: August 28, 2014
Original animation DVD
I'm Enveloped in Breasts!
Directed by	Tetsuya Yanagisawa
Produced by	Jun Hatano
Written by	Takao Yoshioka
Music by	Ryōsuke Nakanishi
Studio	TNK
Released	March 15, 2015
Runtime	24 minutes
Anime television series
High School DxD BorN
Directed by	Tetsuya Yanagisawa
Produced by	Hisato Usui; Jun Hatano; Shigeru Saitō; Takurō Hatakeyama; Tetsuya Tsuchihashi; Kozue Kananiwa; Makoto Itō; Yoshikuni Murata; Ryōki Takagishi
Written by	Takao Yoshioka
Music by	Ryōsuke Nakanishi
Studio	TNK
Licensed by	Crunchyroll: UK: Anime Limited (former)
Original network	AT-X (uncensored); Tokyo MX, SUN, TVA, BS11 (censored)
Original run	April 4, 2015 – June 20, 2015
Episodes	12 + 6 OVAs
Original animation DVD
The Unresurrected Phoenix
Directed by	Tetsuya Yanagisawa
Produced by	Jun Hatano
Written by	Takao Yoshioka
Music by	Ryōsuke Nakanishi
Studio	TNK
Released	December 9, 2015
Runtime	24 minutes
Anime television series
High School DxD Hero
Directed by	Yoshifumi Sueda
Produced by	Kozue Kaneniwa; Satoshi Motonaga; Kei Takebayashi; Satoshi Fukao; Terushige Yoshie; Noritomo Isogai; Misato Aoki; Eriko Aoki
Written by	Kenji Konuta
Music by	Ryosuke Nakanishi
Studio	Passione
Licensed by	Crunchyroll
Original network	AT-X (uncensored); Tokyo MX, SUN, KBS, TVA, BS11 (censored)
Original run	April 10, 2018 – July 3, 2018
Episodes	13 (Note: An episode 0, titled "Holiness Behind the Gym", aired on April 10, 2018, prior to the airing of the first episode of the normal broadcast.)
Light novel
Shin High School DxD
Written by	Ichiei Ishibumi
Illustrated by	Miyama-Zero
Published by	Fujimi Shobo
Imprint	Fujimi Fantasia Bunko
Magazine	Dragon Magazine
Original run	July 20, 2018 – Hiatus
Volumes	4 (Note: + 3 short story collections: DX. 5 to DX. 7)
- icon

High School DxD (Japanese: ハイスクールD×D, Hepburn: Haisukūru Dī Dī) is a Japanese light novel series written by Ichiei Ishibumi and illustrated by Miyama-Zero. The story centers on Issei Hyodo, a perverted high school student from Kuoh Academy who desires to be a harem king and is killed by his first date, revealed to be a fallen angel, but is later revived as a devil by the red-haired devil princess Rias Gremory to serve her and her devil family. Issei's deepening relationship with Rias proves dangerous to the angels, the fallen angels, and the devils. High School DxD began serialization in Fujimi Shobo's Dragon Magazine in its September 2008 issue. The first volume was released on September 20, 2008. A total of twenty five volumes is available in Japan as of March 2018 under their Fujimi Fantasia Bunko imprint. A manga adaptation by Hiroji Mishima was serialised from July 2010 in Dragon Magazine and later in Monthly Dragon Age 'til February 2019, with eleven volumes released.

An anime adaptation by TNK aired on TV Tokyo's satellite channel AT-X and other networks from January 6 to March 23, 2012. The anime is licensed by Crunchyroll in regions outside of Asia. A second season called High School DxD New (ハイスクールD×D NEW, Haisukūru Dī Dī Nyū) aired from July 7 to September 22, 2013. A third season called High School DxD BorN (ハイスクールD×D BorN, Haisukūru Dī Dī Bōn) aired from April 4 to June 20, 2015. A fourth season called High School DxD Hero (ハイスクールD×D Hero, Haisukūru Dī Dī Hīrō) aired from April 10 to July 3, 2018.

== Synopsis ==
=== Plot ===
Kuoh Academy (駒王学園, Kuō Gakuen; alt. Kuou Academy) is a former all-girls school that has recently turned co-ed, but it has a secret. Unknown to normal humans, angels (天使, Tenshi), fallen angels (堕天使, Datenshi) and devils (悪魔, Akuma) comprise part of the student population. One of these students, Issei Hyodo, is a lustful second-year human student who lives a peaceful life. After an ordinary school day, Issei is suddenly asked out on a date by a girl named Yuma Amano. After their date, Yuma brings Issei to a local park and makes a startling request that she wants him to die for her. She reveals herself as Raynare, a fallen angel, and she tries to kill him. Using her summoning card, Rias Gremory, a large breasted third-year student at Kuoh Academy, revives him. Issei wakes up the next morning, thinking that the events that occurred were all just a dream. Immediately after being attacked by another fallen angel and waking up, he notices Rias naked in his room. Rias reveals to Issei her true identity as a devil and says that as a result of his death at the hands of Yuma, she has reincarnated him as a devil, making him her faithful servant in the process.

=== Story arcs ===
Ishibumi has grouped the light novels into story arcs. The first arc, titled The Red Dragon Emperor's Awakening (赤龍帝覚醒, Sekiryūtei Kakusei), ran through the first two volumes. Birth of the Breast Dragon Emperor (乳龍帝誕生, Chichiryūtei Tanjō) is the second story arc and follows volumes three through six. The Heroic Oppai Dragon (英雄(ヒーロー)おっぱいドラゴン, Hīrō Oppai Doragon) follows volumes seven through twelve.^{[LN 12 afterword]} The fourth arc, The Legend of Oppai Dragon and his Lively Companions (おっぱいドラゴンと愉快な仲間たちの伝説, Oppai Doragon to Yukaina Nakamatachi no Densetsu), follows volumes fourteen through twenty-one.^{[LN 14 afterword]} The fifth and final arc of the series, Red Dragon Emperor of the Blazing Truth × White Dragon Emperor of the Morning Star: The True Dragon(s) of the Kuoh Academy (燚誠の赤龍帝×明星の白龍皇 -駒王学園の真なる龍), starts at volume twenty-two and ends at volume twenty-five. The author has announced a sequel to the series, which began on July 20, 2018.

The light novels also feature a series of side stories set in between the main storyline and are often compiled into volumes. So far, three short story collections (Volume 8, Volume 13 and Volume 15) have been published.^{[LN 8]}^{[LN 13]}^{[LN 15]}

== Production ==
Ishibumi had previously worked on a horror genre series two years prior to the publishing of the first light novel for High School DxD. In the volume 1 afterword, he mentions that he changed his writing style, and wanted to develop one in the school-life, love-comedy, battle, and fantasy genre. His main character Issei was made into a lecherous guy at the request of his editor. For the first volume, he made Rias a second lead character and heroine, and Asia to be the second heroine. Some of his characters are loosely referenced from the Bible, non-fiction books, and mythology. He created a world where the war between the three main factions (Angels, Devils, and Fallen Angels) is over, and where many famous angels and devils have already ceased to exist. He also added characters and legendary beasts from a variety of places from Norse mythology to Japanese Youkai.^{[LN 1 afterword]} The concept of Balance Breaker was to represent a super-powered version of the character's Boosted Gear, and he likens this to the Super Saiyan in Dragon Ball and the Bankai in Bleach.^{[LN 2 afterword]}

Ishibumi intended to make the shounen-style light novel series that teenagers would be embarrassed to buy, yet was concerned that it might get an age restriction. In each of his afterword sections in the light novels, he makes numerous references to Oppai (breasts) and notes when he tries to make his characters more erotic.^{[LN 2 afterword]}

== Media ==
=== Light novels ===
High School DxD began as a light novel series written by Ichiei Ishibumi, with illustrations provided by Miyama-Zero. High School DxD was published from September 20, 2008, to March 20, 2018, across 25 volumes. A bonus story, called The First Errand: Ophis Edition (はじめてのおつかい・オーフィス編, Hajimete no Otsukai: Ōfisu Hen), was released with the July 2012 issue of Dragon Magazine (released on May 19, 2012) as a bunkobon volume. The story takes place after Volume 12, and centers on Ophis' first shopping trip in the human world.

After the release of Volume 25, Ishibumi announced a sequel, Shin High School DxD (真はいすくーるDxD, Shin Hai Sukūru Dī Dī). Continuing from where DxD left off, the first volume of the series was released on July 20, 2018. As of February 2020, four volumes have been released.

=== Manga ===
A manga adaptation illustrated by Hiroji Mishima began serialization in the July 2010 issue of Dragon Magazine, and later in Monthly Dragon Age in its March 2011 issue. It ended on February 9, 2018. The first volume was published by Fujimi Shobo on June 9, 2011, with a total of eleven volumes published under their Dragon Comics Age imprint. A spinoff manga, called High School DxD: Asia and Koneko's Secret Contracts!? (ハイスクールD×D アーシア&小猫 ヒミツのけいやく!?, Haisukūru Dī Dī: Āshia ando Koneko Himitsu no Keiyaku!?), illustrated by Hiroichi, was serialized in Monthly Dragon Age from the October 2011 issue (Released on September 9, 2011) to the April 2012 issue (Released on March 9, 2012). Serving as a side story, the manga takes place after chapter 10 of the main manga, and centers on Asia Argento's first duties as a Devil. It was later released as a tankōbon volume on March 9, 2012. Yen Press had licensed the spin-off for an English release and released the volume on December 16, 2014. A second spin-off series, titled High School DxD: The Work of a Devil (ハイスクールD×D アクマのおしごと, Haisukūru Dī Dī: Akuma no Oshigoto), was published between April and August 2013 issues of Monthly Dragon Age and was collected into one volume. Illustrated by SODA, it adapted the short stories found in the light novels.

=== Anime ===
An anime adaptation produced by TNK and directed by Tetsuya Yanagisawa aired on TV Tokyo's satellite channel AT-X between January 6 and March 23, 2012. AT-X airings of the series are uncensored, while the airings on TV Kanagawa (which began on January 11, 2012) and other networks are heavily censored. Six DVD and Blu-ray compilation volumes were released by Media Factory between March 21 and August 29, 2012, each containing an OVA short entitled "Release the Swaying Delusions" (妄想爆揺解除オリジナルビデオ, Mōsō Bakuyure Kaijo Orijinaru Bideo; lit. "Release the Swaying Delusions Original Video"). An OVA episode that is listed as episode 13 was bundled with the limited edition of the 13th light novel on September 6, 2012, on Blu-ray. The script for the episode was handled by Ichiei Ishibumi, who is the author of the light novels. Another OVA episode of the first season that is listed as episode 14 is written by Ishibumi and was bundled with the limited edition release of the 15th light novel on May 31, 2013, on Blu-ray.

A second season of High School DxD, titled High School DxD New (ハイスクールD×D NEW, Haisukūru Dī Dī Nyū), was announced at the post-end credits of the 13th episode, and premiered on AT-X and Chiba TV on July 7, 2013. The second season adapts volumes three and four of the light novels and is split into two arcs: Excalibur of the Moonlit Schoolyard (ハイスクールD×D3 月光校庭のエクスカリバー, Gekkō Kōtei no Ekusukaribā) and Vampire of the Empty Classroom (停止教室のヴァンパイア, Teishi Kyōshitsu no Vanpaia). As with the first season, AT-X airings are uncensored, while airings on all other channels are heavily censored.

In June 2014, Fujimi Shobo announced plans to produce a third anime season. It was announced on December 6, 2014, that the third season is titled High School DxD BorN, and aired from April to June 2015, with the same staff and voice cast. The series loosely adapts volumes five through seven of the light novels for the first 9 episodes, with the last two and a half episodes comprising a completely original story; the second half of the season finale incorporates elements from both Volume 6 and Volume 7.

At the 2016 Fantasia Bunko Daikanshasai, Fujimi Shobo announced that a new anime series was in production. In October 2017, it was announced that the fourth season is titled High School DxD Hero (ハイスクールD×D Hero, Haisukūru Dī Dī Hīrō) and it aired from April to July 2018. The season was produced by Passione, replacing TNK and using Clip Studio Paint.

In North America, all four seasons are licensed by Funimation for simulcast on their video website before releasing the series on DVD and Blu-ray and in Australia by Madman Entertainment. Manga Entertainment have licensed the series in the UK for a DVD and Blu-ray release in 2014. Funimation released the first season of High School DxD on DVD and Blu-ray on August 20, 2013. Funimation released the second season of High School DxD titled High School DXD New on DVD and Blu-ray on November 11, 2014. Funimation released the third season of High School DxD titled High School DXD BorN on DVD and Blu-ray on September 6, 2016. Funimation has also licensed High School DxD Hero and streamed it with a simuldub on May 1, 2018. The series has also been simulcast by Crunchyroll. Following Sony's acquisition of Crunchyroll, the series was moved to Crunchyroll.

The series is licensed in Australia by Madman Entertainment, but it was not released in New Zealand after the Office of Film and Literature Classification (OFLC) classified it objectionable it because "it encourages and legitimizes the pursuit of young persons as viable adult sexual partners". The series was reclassified R16 in 2022. High School DxD Hero is licensed by Funimation in Australia and New Zealand, with Madman Entertainment handling distribution.

==== Music ====
The music of the High School DxD series was composed by Ryosuke Nakanishi. Eight pieces of theme music are used for the three seasons. The opening theme for the first season is "Trip -Innocent of D-", performed by Larval Stage Planning, while the ending theme song is "STUDYxSTUDY" by the voice actress unit StylipS, consisting of Arisa Noto, Yui Ogura, Kaori Ishihara, and Maho Matsunaga, who all had voice roles in the anime. The songs were released as CD singles on January 25 and February 5, 2012, respectively, under the Lantis label. An original soundtrack was released on March 21, 2012, also under the Lantis label. A character song mini-album, called High School DxD GirlsxSongs! (『ハイスクールD×D』Girls×Songs!, Haisukūru Dī Dī Gāruzu Songuzu!), featuring the main female cast from the anime series, was released on June 27, 2012, under the Lantis label.

The second season featured an opening and ending theme for the two arcs. The opening theme for the first arc is "Sympathy" by Larval Stage Planning. The ending theme for the first arc is Hōteishiki wa Kotaenai (方程式は答えない) by the Occult Research Club Girls (オカルト研究部ガールズ, Okaruto Kenkyū-bu Gāruzu), featuring Rias Gremory (Yōko Hikasa), Akeno Himejima (Shizuka Itō), Asia Argento (Azumi Asakura), and Koneko Toujou (Ayana Taketatsu). The opening theme for the second arc is "Passionate Argument" (激情論, Gekijō-ron) by Zaq. The ending theme for the second arc is "Lovely♥Devil" (らぶりぃ♥でびる, Raburyi♥Debiru) by the Occult Research Club Girls, featuring the main female voice cast from the first season with the additions of Xenovia (Risa Taneda) and Gasper (Ayane Sakura).

For the third season, the opening theme is "Bless Your Name" by ChouCho. The ending theme is "Give Me Secret" by StylipS.

For the fourth season, the opening theme is "Switch" by Minami and the ending theme is "Mote nai Kuse ni(｀;ω;´)" by Tapimiru.

=== Video games ===
Kadokawa Games announced in July 2013 that a videogame adaptation of High School DxD was in development for Nintendo 3DS. Originally scheduled to be released in Japan on November 28, 2013, it was delayed in order to "improve the product's quality", and was instead released on December 19, 2013. Described as an "erotic battle adventure", the game features a visual novel and turn-based battle system. A PlayStation Vita game titled High School DxD New Fight was released on August 28, 2014, in Japan. On July 29, 2016, the game service was officially ceased and ended by Marvelous company.

A browser game titled High School D×D Operation Paradise Infinity was released on April 22, 2025, by Japanese games platform G123 operated by CTW Inc..

=== Other media ===
An internet radio show, called High School DxD: The Occult Research Club Inside Kuoh Academy (ハイスクールD×D 駒王学園 裏オカルト研究部, Haisukūru Dī Dī KuŌ Gakuen Ura-Okaruto Kenkyū-bu), aired on HiBiKi Radio Station on December 12, 2011.

A trading card game by Prism Connect featuring characters from the series was released on July 27, 2012, in a starter deck and booster pack.

== Reception ==
According to Oricon, High School DxD was the sixth top-selling light novel series in Japan for 2012, selling a total of 654,224 units. Also, in 2013 High School DxD sold over 346,173 copies according to Oricon. The English version of the first manga volume reached No. 2 in the New York Times best-seller list. As of May 2, 2024, the series sold more than 7.8 million copies in print worldwide.

The anime adaptation of High School DxD received favourable reviews, with critics praising the visuals, musical score, and sometimes the salacious scenes. Sequential Tart, in a review of the anime, praised the animation quality, voice acting, and salacious scenes, as well as the depth of the "actually really engaging" plot. Finding the animation "to die for" and the music "fun throughout", Active Anime lauded DxD as "a kick ass action comedy that's crazy sexy", with "sexy devil ladies, a hero with heart, and exhilarating action mak[ing] this a win-win!" Stig Høgset of THEM Anime Reviews agreed on DxD being "a whole lot of fun", praising the characters, salaciousness, and visuals. Writing that "High School DxD turned out to be a really pleasant surprise", Høgset continued that "I will certainly look into the sequel if FUNimation ever gets it out the door on disc."

Anime News Network's Theron Martin in his official series review of High School DxD, praised the color, musical, fanservice and character developments, concluding that "Evaluated as a general release series, High School DxD has enough going for it to be a little better than average. Evaluate it as a fan service-focused series, though, and it is one of the top recent titles of its type."
