= List of High School DxD episodes =

Cover of the first DVD/Blu-ray volume of High School DxD as released by Media Factory on March 21, 2012

High School DxD is an anime television series adapted from the light novels of the same title written by Ichiei Ishibumi and illustrated by Miyama-Zero. Produced by TNK, directed by Tetsuya Yanagisawa, and written by Takao Yoshioka, the anime aired on TV Tokyo's satellite channel AT-X from January 6 to March 23, 2012. Set during the struggle among the devils, fallen angels, and angels, the story follows the adventures of Issei Hyodo. Issei is a perverted high school student who is killed by his first date, who is revealed to be a fallen angel. He is revived by Rias Gremory, who is a crimson-haired school beauty that is actually a devil, and becomes her servant. The first season adapts material from the first two volumes of the light novels and a few side stories from Volume 8.

The second season, titled High School DxD New (ハイスクールD×D(ディーディー) NEW(ニュー), Haisukūru Dī Dī Nyū), aired from July 7 to September 22, 2013. The second season adapts the third and fourth volumes of the light novels, with its episodes split between two arcs: The Excalibur of the Moonlit Schoolyard (月光校庭のエクスカリバー, Gekkō Kōtei no Ekusukaribā) and The Vampire of the Empty Classroom (停止教室のヴァンパイア, Teishi Kyōshitsu no Banpaia). The third season, High School DxD Born (ハイスクールD×D(ディーディー) BorN(ボーン), Haisukūru Dī Dī Bōn), aired from April 4 to June 20, 2015. The third season's first nine episodes adapts material from the fifth to the seventh volumes of the light novels, while the last three episodes form an original self-contained story arc. This would be the final work by TNK on High School DxD due to creative differences between Director Tetsuya Yanagisawa, script writer Takao Yoshioka and original series writer Ichiei Ishibumi. The fourth season, High School DxD Hero, aired from April 10 to July 3, 2018, adapts material from the ninth and tenth volumes of the light novel and is produced by Passione, using Clip Studio Paint, directed by Yoshifumi Sueda, and written by Kenji Konuta. During production of this season Ishibumi had the Passione staff read nearly all of the light novels so that they don't miss any inaccuracies and warned them off taking any creative liberties with the material like TNK had.

Six DVD and Blu-ray compilation volumes of the first season were released by Media Factory between March 21, 2012, and August 29, 2012. Each contained an OVA short entitled "Release the Swaying Delusions" (妄想爆揺解除オリジナルビデオ, Mōsō Bakuyure Kaijo Orijinaru Bideo; lit. 'Release the Swaying Delusions Original Video') and other bonus material. An OVA episode that is listed as episode 13 was released with the limited edition of the 13th light novel volume on September 6, 2012, on Blu-ray. The script was handled by Ichiei Ishibumi, who is the author of the light novels. Another OVA episode that is listed as episode 14 is written by Ishibumi and was bundled with the limited edition release of the 15th light novel volume on May 31, 2013, on Blu-ray. The first DVD and Blu-ray compilations of High School DxD New was released by Media Factory on September 25, 2013. The sixth and final compilation was released on February 26, 2014.

In North America, the anime series is licensed by Funimation for simulcast on their website and home video releases on DVD and Blu-ray. In Australia, the series is licensed by Madman Entertainment, but it was not released in New Zealand after the Office of Film and Literature Classification (OFLC) decided against releasing it because "it encourages and legitimizes the pursuit of young persons as viable adult sexual partners". Funimation released the first season on August 20, 2013, the second season on November 11, 2014, and the third season on September 6, 2016.

The original score for the series was composed by Ryosuke Nakanishi. Ten pieces of theme music are used for the series: five opening themes and five ending themes. The opening theme for the first season is titled "Trip -Innocent of D-" and performed by J-pop group Larval Stage Planning. The ending theme is titled "STUDYxSTUDY" and performed by the voice actress unit StylipS, which consists of Arisa Noto, Yui Ogura, Kaori Ishihara, and Maho Matsunaga. The opening theme for the first arc of the second season is titled "Sympathy" and performed by Larval Stage Planning. The ending theme for the first arc of the second season is titled Hōteishiki wa Kotaenai (方程式は答えない) and performed by the Occult Research Club Girls (オカルト研究部ガールズ, Okaruto Kenkyū-bu Gāruzu), which is a voice actress unit consisting of Rias Gremory (Yōko Hikasa), Akeno Himejima (Shizuka Itō), Asia Argento (Azumi Asakura), and Koneko Toujou (Ayana Taketatsu). The opening theme for the second arc of the second season is titled "Passionate Argument" (激情論, Gekijō-ron) and performed by Zaq. The ending theme for the second arc of the second season is titled "Lovely♥Devil" (らぶりぃ♥でびる, Raburyi♥Debiru) and performed by the Occult Research Club Girls, which also features Xenovia (Risa Taneda) and Gasper (Ayane Sakura). For the third season, the opening theme is titled "Bless Your Name" and performed by ChouCho. The ending theme is titled "Give Me Secret" and performed by StylipS. For the fourth season, the opening theme is titled "Switch" by Minami, and the ending theme is Mote nai Kuse ni (モテないくせに(`;ω;´)) by Tapimiru.

== Series overview ==
| Season | Episodes | Originally released | |
| Season | Episodes | First released | Last released |
|---|---|---|---|
| 1 | 14 | January 6, 2012 | March 23, 2012 |
| 2 | 13 | July 7, 2013 | September 22, 2013 |
| 3 | 13 | April 10, 2015 | June 20, 2015 |
| 4 | 12 | April 10, 2018 | July 3, 2018 |

== Episodes ==
=== Season 1 (2012) ===
| No. overall | No. in season | Title | Directed by | Written by | Original release date |
|---|---|---|---|---|---|
| 1 | 1 | "I Got a Girlfriend!"; Transliteration: "Kanojo, Dekimashita!" (Japanese: 彼女、できました!) | Taro Kubo | Takao Yoshioka | January 6, 2012 |
| 2 | 2 | "I Quit Being Human!"; Transliteration: "Ningen, Yamemashita!" (Japanese: 人間、やめました!) | Kazuhide Kondo | Takao Yoshioka | January 13, 2012 |
| 3 | 3 | "I Got a Friend!"; Transliteration: "Tomodachi, Dekimashita!" (Japanese: 友達、できました!) | Kosuke Kobayashi | Takao Yoshioka | January 20, 2012 |
| 4 | 4 | "I'm Saving My Friend!"; Transliteration: "Tomodachi, Sukuimasu!" (Japanese: 友達、救います!) | Masayuki Iimura | Takao Yoshioka | January 27, 2012 |
| 5 | 5 | "I Will Defeat My Ex-girlfriend!"; Transliteration: "Motokano, Taoshimasu!" (Japanese: 元カノ、倒します!) | Tetsuya Yanagisawa | Takao Yoshioka | February 3, 2012 |
| 6 | 6 | "I Work as a Devil!"; Transliteration: "Akuma, Yattemasu!" (Japanese: アクマ、やってます!) | Akira Shimizu | Takao Yoshioka | February 10, 2012 |
| 7 | 7 | "I Get a Familiar!"; Transliteration: "Tsukaima, Getto Shimasu!" (Japanese: 使い魔、ゲットします!) | Takenori Mihara | Takao Yoshioka | February 17, 2012 |
| 8 | 8 | "I Pick a Fight!"; Transliteration: "Kenka, Urimasu!" (Japanese: 喧嘩、売ります!) | Koji Kobayashi | Takao Yoshioka | February 24, 2012 |
| 9 | 9 | "I've Begun My Training!"; Transliteration: "Shugyō, Hajimemashita!" (Japanese: 修行、はじめました!) | Kosuke Kobayashi | Takao Yoshioka | March 2, 2012 |
| 10 | 10 | "The Showdown Begins!"; Transliteration: "Kessen, Hajimarimasu!" (Japanese: 決戦、始まります!) | Masayuki Iimura | Takao Yoshioka | March 9, 2012 |
| 11 | 11 | "The Acclaimed Battle Continues!"; Transliteration: "Zessan, Kessenchū desu!" (Japanese: 絶賛、決戦中です!) | Taro Kubo | Takao Yoshioka | March 16, 2012 |
| 12 | 12 | "I'm Here to Keep My Promise!"; Transliteration: "Yakusoku, Mamori ni Kimashita!" (Japanese: 約束、守りに来ました！) | Tetsuya Yanagisawa | Takao Yoshioka | March 23, 2012 |
| 13 | OVA–1 | "I'm Harvesting Breasts! (episode lists the name as "Boobs Bearing Fruit!")"; Transliteration: "Oppai, Minorimasu!" (Japanese: おっぱい、実ります！) | Koji Kobayashi | Takao Yoshioka | September 6, 2012 |
| 14 | OVA–2 | "I'm Searching for Breasts! (episode lists name as "I Seek Boobies!")"; Transliteration: "Oppai, Motomemasu!" (Japanese: おっぱい、求めます!) | Masayuki Iimura | Takao Yoshioka | May 31, 2013 |

=== Season 2: New (2013) ===
| No. overall | No. in season | Title | Directed by | Written by | Original release date |
|---|---|---|---|---|---|
| 15 | 1 | "Another Disquieting Premonition!"; Transliteration: "Fuon'na Yokan, Futatabi desu!" (Japanese: 不穏な予感、再びです!) | Masayuki Iimura | Takao Yoshioka | July 7, 2013 |
| 16 | 2 | "The Holy Sword Is Here!"; Transliteration: "Seiken, Kimashita!" (Japanese: 聖剣、来ました！) | Kenichi Matsuzawa | Takao Yoshioka | July 14, 2013 |
| 17 | 3 | "I'll Destroy the Holy Sword!"; Transliteration: "Seiken, Hakai Shimasu!" (Japanese: 聖剣、破壊します！) | Takashi Kobayashi | Takao Yoshioka | July 21, 2013 |
| 18 | 4 | "A Strong Enemy Appeared!"; Transliteration: "Kyōiteki, Arawaremashita!" (Japanese: 強い敵、現れました！) | Masakazu Amiya | Takao Yoshioka | July 28, 2013 |
| 19 | 5 | "Decisive Battle at Kuoh Academy!"; Transliteration: "Kessen, Kuō Gakuen!" (Japanese: 決戦、駒王学園!) | Tetsuya Yanagisawa | Takao Yoshioka | August 4, 2013 |
| 20 | 6 | "Go! Occult Research Club!"; Transliteration: "Ike! Okaruto Kenkyū-bu!" (Japanese: 行け! オカルト研究部!) | Taro Kubo | Takao Yoshioka | August 11, 2013 |
| 21 | 7 | "Summer! Bathing Suits! I'm in Trouble!"; Transliteration: "Natsu-desu! Mizugi-desu! Pinchi-desu!" (Japanese: 夏です！水着です！ピンチです！) | Isshin Shimizu | Takao Yoshioka | August 18, 2013 |
| 22 | 8 | "Open House Begins!"; Transliteration: "Jugyō Sankan, Hajimarimasu!" (Japanese: 授業参観、はじまります！) | Masayuki Iimura | Takao Yoshioka | August 25, 2013 |
| 23 | 9 | "I Have a Junior!"; Transliteration: "Kōhai, Dekimashita!" (Japanese: 後輩、できました！) | Takashi Kobayashi | Takao Yoshioka | September 1, 2013 |
| 24 | 10 | "Various Three-way Deadlocks!"; Transliteration: "Iroiro, Sansukumidesu!" (Japanese: 色々、三すくみです！) | Yoshikata Nitta | Takao Yoshioka | September 8, 2013 |
| 25 | 11 | "The Leaders' Summit Begins!"; Transliteration: "Toppu Kaidan, Hajimarimasu!" (Japanese: トップ会談、はじまります！) | Masayuki Iimura | Takao Yoshioka | September 15, 2013 |
| 26 | 12 | "Clash of the Twin Heavenly Dragons!"; Transliteration: "Nitenryū, Gekitotsu!" (Japanese: 二天龍、激突！) | Yasuhiro Minami | Takao Yoshioka | September 22, 2013 |
| 27 | OVA–1 | "I'm Enveloped in Breasts!"; Transliteration: "Oppai, Tsutsumimasu!" (Japanese: おっぱい、包みます！) | Tetsuya Yanagisawa | Takao Yoshioka | March 10, 2015 |

=== Season 3: Born (2015) ===
| No. overall | No. in season | Title | Directed by | Written by | Original release date |
|---|---|---|---|---|---|
| 28 | 1 | "Summer Break! Off to the Underworld!"; Transliteration: "Natsuyasumi, Meikai e GO!" (Japanese: 夏休み、冥界へGO) | Shunji Yoshida | Takao Yoshioka | April 4, 2015 |
| 29 | 2 | "Young Devils Gather"; Transliteration: "Wakate Akuma, Shūgō desu!" (Japanese: 若手悪魔、集合です) | Matsuo Asami | Takao Yoshioka | April 11, 2015 |
| 30 | 3 | "Cat and Dragon"; Transliteration: "Neko to Doragon" (Japanese: 猫とドラゴン) | Matsuo Asami | Takao Yoshioka | April 18, 2015 |
| 31 | 4 | "Interception, Commence!"; Transliteration: "Geigeki, Kaishi desu!" (Japanese: 迎撃、開始です！) | Yasuhiro Minami | Takao Yoshioka | April 25, 2015 |
| 32 | 5 | "The Last Day of Summer Break!"; Transliteration: "Natsuyasumi Saigo no Hidesu!" (Japanese: 夏休み最後の日です!) | Takahiro Majima | Takao Yoshioka | May 2, 2015 |
| 33 | 6 | "Second Semester has Started!"; Transliteration: "Nigakki, Hajimemashita!" (Japanese: 二学期、はじまりました！) | Hodaka Kuramoto | Takao Yoshioka | May 9, 2015 |
| 34 | 7 | "The Night Before Battle!"; Transliteration: "Taisen Zen'ya desu!" (Japanese: 対戦前夜です!) | Kaoru Habana | Takao Yoshioka | May 16, 2015 |
| 35 | 8 | "We will save Asia!"; Transliteration: "Āshia, Sukuimasu!" (Japanese: アーシア、救います！) | Shunji Yoshida | Takao Yoshioka | May 23, 2015 |
| 36 | 9 | "Dragon of Dragon"; Transliteration: "Doragon Obu Doragon" (Japanese: ドラゴン・オブ・ドラゴン) | Masayuki Nomoto; Yasuhiro Minami | Takao Yoshioka | May 30, 2015 |
| 37 | 10 | "Occult Research Club Vanishes!?"; Transliteration: "Oka-ken Shōshitsu!?" (Japanese: オカ研消失!?) | Matsuo Asami | Takao Yoshioka | June 6, 2015 |
| 38 | 11 | "I Will Fight!"; Transliteration: "Ore, Tatakaimasu!" (Japanese: 俺、戦います!) | Motohiro Abe | Takao Yoshioka | June 13, 2015 |
| 39 | 12 | "Any Time, For All Time!"; Transliteration: "Itsudemo, Itsumademo!" (Japanese: いつでも、いつまでも！) | Hodaka Kuramoto | Takao Yoshioka | June 20, 2015 |
| 40 | OVA–1 | "The Unresurrected Phoenix"; Transliteration: "Yomigaerarenai fushichou" (Japanese: 蘇らない不死鳥) | Tetsuya Yanagisawa | Takao Yoshioka | December 9, 2015 |

=== Season 4: Hero (2018) ===
| No. overall | No. in season | Title | Directed by | Written by | Original release date |
|---|---|---|---|---|---|
| 41 | 0 | "Holiness Behind the Gym"; Transliteration: "Taīkukan ura no Hōrī" (Japanese: 体育館裏のホーリー) | Shin Matsuo; Toru Kitahata | Kenji Konuta | April 10, 2018 |
| 42 | 1 | "That's Right, Let's Go to Kyoto"; Transliteration: "Sō sa, Kyōto ni ikou" (Japanese: そうさ、京都に行こう) | Yutaka Hirata | Kenji Konuta | April 17, 2018 |
| 43 | 2 | "School Trip, an Abrupt Attack"; Transliteration: "Shūgakuryokō, Ikinari Shūgekidesu" (Japanese: 修学旅行、いきなり襲撃です) | Taro Kubo | Yōichi Takahashi | April 24, 2018 |
| 44 | 3 | "The Party of Heroes"; Transliteration: "Eiyū-sama go ikkō desu" (Japanese: 英雄さまごー行です) | Hidehiko Kadota | Yasuharu Shimuzu | May 1, 2018 |
| 45 | 4 | "Showdown! Gremory Family vs. Hero Faction in Kyoto"; Transliteration: "Kessen! Guremorī Kenzoku VS Eiyū-ha IN Kyōto" (Japanese: 決戦!グレモリー眷属VS英雄派IN京都) | Yutaka Hirata | Kenji Konuta | May 8, 2018 |
| 46 | 5 | "My Potential Released!"; Transliteration: "Kanōsei ga Tokihanata remasu!" (Japanese: 可能性が解き放たれます!) | Taro Kubo | Yōichi Takahashi | May 15, 2018 |
| 47 | 6 | "The School Trip is in Pandemonium"; Transliteration: "Shūgakuryokō wa Pandemoniumu" (Japanese: 修学旅行はパンデモニウム) | Mihiro Yamaguchi | Yasuharu Shimuzu | May 22, 2018 |
| 48 | 7 | "We are Preparing for the School Festival!"; Transliteration: "Gakuen-sai no Junbi desu!" (Japanese: 学園祭の準備です！) | Saori Tachibana; Masaru Kawashima | Kenji Konuta | May 29, 2018 |
| 49 | 8 | "A Girl's Heart is Complicated"; Transliteration: "Otome Kokoro wa Fukuzatsu desu" (Japanese: 乙女心は複雑です) | Takahiro Majima | Yōichi Takahashi | June 5, 2018 |
| 50 | 9 | "The Deciding Battle of the Strongest Youth, Begins!"; Transliteration: "Wakate Saikyō Kettei-sen, Kaishi desu!" (Japanese: 若手最強決定戦、開始です！) | Yoshio Suzuki; Kotaro Kurosugi | Yasuharu Shimuzu | June 12, 2018 |
| 51 | 10 | "As a Family Member of Rias Gremory"; Transliteration: "Riasu Guremorī no Kenzoku to shite" (Japanese: リアス・グレモリーの眷属として) | Taro Kubo | Yasuharu Shimuzu | June 19, 2018 |
| 52 | 11 | "Man against Man"; Transliteration: "life.MAX vs power.MAX『Otoko tai Otoko』" (Japanese: life.MAX VS power.MAX『赤龍帝 対 獅子王』) | Mihiro Yamaguchi | Yōichi Takahashi | June 26, 2018 |
| 53 | 12 | "Lion Heart of the School Festival"; Transliteration: "life.MAXIMUM VS power.MAXIMUM『Gakuen-sai no Raion Hāto』" (Japanese: life.MAXIMUM VS power.MAXIMUM『学園祭のライオンハート』) | Masayuki Yamada | Kenji Konuta | July 3, 2018 |

== See also ==
- Ichiei Ishibumi
- High School DxD characters
- High School DxD light novels
