= List of High School DxD characters =

The light novel, manga, and anime series High School DxD features a diverse cast of characters. The visuals of the characters were designed by Miyama-Zero and their stories were created by Ichiei Ishibumi. The stories follow the adventures of Issei Hyoudou, a perverted high school student who is killed by his first date, but reborn as a devil to serve Rias Gremory, a crimson-haired school beauty who heads the Occult Research Club (オカルト研究部, Okaruto Kenkyū-bu). Issei, Rias, and the club members interact with various groups and organizations, some of which are run by devils who compete against them in sanctioned combat matches called Rating Games, where the characters have been assigned positions akin to chess pieces.

== Creation and conception ==
Author Ichiei Ishibumi had previously worked on a horror genre series two years before publishing the first light novel for High School DxD. In the volume 1 afterword, he mentions that he changed his writing style, and wanted to develop one in the school-life, love-comedy, battle, and fantasy genre. His main character Issei was made into a lecherous guy at the request of his editor. For the first volume, he made Rias a second lead character and heroine, and Asia to be the second heroine. Some of his characters are loosely referenced from the Bible, non-fiction books, and mythology. He created a world where the war between the three main factions (angels, devils, and fallen angels) is over, and where many famous angels and devils have already ceased to exist. He also added characters and legendary beasts from a variety of places from Norse mythology to Japanese yokai.^{[LN 1 afterword]} Ishibumi named the Four Great Devils after characters from the Gundam media franchise. For example, Sirzechs Lucifer is a combination of Char Aznable and Zechs Merquise, and Millicas is named after Merquise and Aznable's real names Milliardo and Casval.

In Volume 5 of the light novels, Ishibumi writes that he likes to pair the main characters: Rias and Akeno as the big sister duo, Asia and Xenovia are the church-related duo who become friends, Gasper and Koneko are the young first-years, and Issei and Yuto are the guys.^{[LN 5 afterword]}

When Rias' English voice actress Jamie Marchi was writing the dub script, she noted it was a breast-centric show, even noting that they have sound effects for when they move. She saw the main heroine Rias was calm and stern and a character that she isn't used to playing. She also liked giving the side characters more personality. Ishibumi also agrees with the appeal of the characters' oppai (breasts) especially in later volumes of the light novels, and had planned to make the heroines more erotic,^{[LN 1 afterword]} especially in the side story volumes that focus on comedy.^{[LN 7 afterword]}

== Main characters ==
Most of the protagonists serve as members of Kuoh Academy's Occult Research Club, a team of ten devils, an angel and a dragon which is a front for Rias Gremory's team of devils.^{[LN 1]} They are involved in various devil activities from making contracts with humans to participating in Rating Games and other conflicts that involve the school.^{[LN 2]} At the end of volume 4 of the light novels (and the second anime series), fallen angel leader Azazel becomes the club's adviser, and has the girls live at Issei Hyoudou's home.^{[LN 4]}^{[S2 ep 12]}

=== Issei Hyoudou ===
Voiced by: Yuki Kaji (Japanese); Scott Freeman (Seasons 1–2), Jessie James Grelle (Season 3 – present) (Note: Credited as Josh Grelle.) (English)

Issei Hyodo (兵藤 一誠, Hyōdō Issei; Issei Hyoudou) (Note: Issei's name is often spelled in katakana as Issē (イッセー); this reading is often used by the characters close to him.) is the viewpoint character and the main protagonist of High School DxD. Introduced as a second-year high school student at Kuoh Academy, he has a reputation for being lecherous. Raynare, posing as Yuma Amano, goes out on a date with him. However, Issei realizes too late that the date was a trap set up by Raynare, and is fatally stabbed in the stomach. After he is revived by Rias Gremory, he becomes a devil and her servant, where he joins the school's Occult Research Club. Ishibumi describes him as "a guy who loves girls and is really stupid".^{[LN 1 afterword]}

Issei demonstrates great potential as his resurrection required Rias to consume all eight pawns of her allotted team.^{[S1 ep 5]} Learning that he can assemble his own team in the future, he aspires to become a Harem King.^{[S1 ep 2]} He tries to protect and help his friends,^{[S1 ep 3]} some of whom fall in love with him, but while he enjoys their lustful affections, he is also scared of them and doesn't want to get serious with them because of the trauma suffered from Raynare.^{[LN 10]} As he progresses, he becomes a middle-rank devil,^{[LN 12]} and acquires a familiar named Skithblathnir.^{[LN 13]}^{[LN 14]} He later reaches the upper-ranks, with Asia, Xenovia, Ravel and Rossweisse as part of his group.^{[LN 22]}

Issei's main item in combat is the Boosted Gear, (Note: 赤龍帝の籠手(ブーステッド・ギア), Būsuteddo Gia; lit. "gauntlet of the red dragon") a Sacred Gear which initially takes the form of a gauntlet on his left arm.^{[S1 ep 3]} Rias reveals that the Gear is one of the Thirteen Longinus items;^{[S1 ep 5]} as it houses Ddraig,^{[S1 ep 12]} the Red Dragon Emperor.^{[S1 ep 9]} His abilities with the Gear include: Boost enables him to double his powers every ten seconds;^{[S1 ep 4]} Boosted Gear Gift (Note: 赤龍帝からの贈り物(ブーステッド・ギア・ギフト), Būsuteddo Gia Gifuto) lets him amplify his ally's ability; ^{[LN 5]}^{[S1 ep 11]} and Dragon Shot (Note: 魔力弾(ドラゴンショット), Doragon Shotto) fires a beam against his enemies.^{[S1 ep 9]} He can be promoted to use additional abilities associated with higher ranked pieces, either by reaching an opponent's headquarters during a Rating Game, or with the permission of the King.^{[S1 ep 11]} Over the course of the series, he becomes more powerful and acquires abilities and powers such as Juggernaut Drive,^{[LN 6]} Balance Breaker Scale Mail,^{[LN 4]}^{[S1 ep 12]} Illegal Move Trident (Note: 赤龍帝の三叉成駒(イリーガル・ムーブ・トリアイナ), Irīgaru Mūbu Toriaina) (which allows him to be promoted without the restrictions);^{[LN 8]}^{[LN 10]} Dividing Wyvern Fairy^{[LN 16]} and Longinus Smasher.^{[LN 17]} He also has not-so-serious techniques that he uses against his female opponents including: Dress Break (Note: 洋服崩壊(ドレス・ブレイク), Doresu Bureiku) obliterates a girl's clothes after previously touching her;^{[S1 ep 10]} and Bilingual (Note: 乳語翻訳(パイリンガル), Bairingaru) listens to her inner thoughts as if her breasts are talking.

=== Rias Gremory ===
Voiced by: Yōko Hikasa (Japanese) (Japanese); Jamie Marchi (English) (English)

Rias Gremory (リアス・グレモリー, Riasu Guremorī) is the main female protagonist and the primary heroine of the series; she revives Issei after he is killed by Raynare.^{[LN 1 afterword]} A tall red-haired devil with a voluptuous body, she is a third-year top-ranking high school student at Kuoh Academy (駒王学園, Kuō Gakuen); she is also the leader of the Occult Research Club (オカルト研究部, Okaruto Kenkyū-bu), which is a front for her devil team, of which she is the King.^{[S1 ep 3]} Known as the Crimson-Haired Ruin Princess (紅髪の滅殺姫(ルイン・プリンセス), Benigami no Ruin Purinsesu) and the heiress to the Gremory family of devils, she goes to a normal high school where she does not have to flaunt her status.^{[S1 ep 5]}

She develops feelings for Issei over the course of the series. In the storyline where she is to be Riser Phoenix's girlfriend, she resigns her Rating Game against him in order to save him;^{[S1 ep 11]} however, after Issei subsequently defeats Riser, she kisses him and moves into his family's home.^{[S1 ep 12]} She does not mind being intimate with Issei,^{[S2 ep 1]} but gets upset when other girls want to steal him away.^{[S2 ep 7]}^{[S2 ep 8]} Later, Rias' mother, Venelana, encourages her to push her relationship further with Issei (in which Rias would attempt to seduce Issei), but gets upset when Issei could not call her by her name. Eventually, Issei finally professes his love for her and calls Rias by her first name instead of her President title. She cries tears of joy and tells him that she feels the same way and the two officially become a couple. Though it seems none of the other girls (Akeno, Xenovia, Asia, Koneko, Irina, Rossweisse and Ravel) have given up on Issei. She has also shown more tolerance towards Issei's dreams of becoming Harem King, even allowing everyone to make dates with Issei with the understanding that he will always return to her afterwards. At her graduation, Issei proposes to Rias; which Rias accepts, becoming one of his girlfriends.

Her brother is one of the Four Great Devils, Lucifer, and both of them possess the Power of Destruction that was inherited by their mother, who came from the House of Bael, which are famous for that power. Rias eventually masters a new finishing attack during her training with Akeno. She later leaves for Romania with Kiba and Azazel to know more about Gasper's ability. In volume 16 she finally shows her new move, called Extinguished Star; Rias manipulates her Power of Destruction into a compression of unimaginable amounts of demonic power; takes form of an enormous sphere with a mixture of crimson and black aura radiating from inside of it that launches it toward her enemies in a slow velocity. It has the ability of a magnetic force; pulling the enemies towards it and get disintegrate by the latter.

=== Asia Argento ===
Voiced by: Azumi Asakura (Japanese); Chloe Daniels (Seasons 1–3), Leah Clark (Season 4 – present) (English)

While being raised as a nun of the Catholic Church, Asia Argento (アーシア・アルジェント, Āshia Arujento), a blonde-haired girl, develops her abilities to heal people. However, Diodora Astaroth injures himself and has Asia heal him. As a result, Asia is excommunicated from the church.^{[S1 ep 4]} When she moves to Japan, she befriends Issei, but is abducted by Raynare who removes and steals her healing rings and kills her. After a lengthy battle, Rias revives her to become a devil and serve as her bishop.^{[S1 ep 5]} She moves into the Hyoudou residence and transfers to their school.^{[S1 ep 6]} Despite her devil identity, Asia tries to continue her faith, although whenever she prays or reads the Bible, she initially gets a severe headache.^{[S1 ep 6]}^{[S1 ep 9]} (Note: Following the events of the summit in the fourth volume the light novels, Issei is able to get archangel Michael to grant an exception in The System for Asia and Xenovia, so that they can pray as devils to the Church without incurring pain.^{[LN 4]}) She possesses a set of Sacred Gear rings called Twilight Healing (Note: 聖母の微笑(トワイライト・ヒーリング), Towairaito Hīringu).

Asia is strongly attracted to Issei as her first friend; she is jealous whenever he acts perverted towards the other girls, asking that he redirect his actions towards her. This makes Issei conflicted between wanting to protect her innocence and indulging in her affections.^{[S1 ep 8]}^{[S2 ep 1]}^{[S2 ep 2]} Her familiar is a baby Sprite Dragon named Rassei (Note: ラッセー, Rassē; Rassei a portmanteau of the dragon's blue lightning ability and Issei.)^{[S1 ep 7]} She later becomes a Dragon User, ^{[LN 14]} and after Rias and Akeno graduate, she becomes the club's new president.^{[LN 18]}

=== Akeno Himejima ===
Voiced by: Shizuka Itō (Japanese); Teri Rogers (Seasons 1–2), Bryn Apprill (Note: Credited as Kelly Angel) (Season 3 – present) (English)

Akeno Himejima (姫島 朱乃, Himejima Akeno) is the black-haired vice-president of the Occult Research Club; she wears her hair in a long ponytail. Issei describes her as an ideal Japanese woman with a pretty face that is always smiling, and along with Rias, make up the two great big sisters that are idolized at the school.^{[ LN 1]} She exhibits a gentle personality, but during combat, becomes highly sadistic.^{[S1 ep 3]}. As Rias's queen, she possesses a variety of abilities, preferring elemental attacks^{[S1 ep 3]} such as lightning strikes.^{[LN 3]} She transforms her costume to that of a shrine priestess^{[S1 ep 4]} and assumes the nickname Priestess of Thunder.^{[S1 ep 10]}

Later on, she helps draw off energy from Issei's Boosted Gear by sucking on his finger, and flirts more openly with him.^{[S2 ep 7]} She is later revealed to be the daughter of the fallen angel leader Baraqiel and a human shrine maiden.^{[S2 ep 6]} After showing Issei her mixed wings, she is concerned he will hate her, but he accepts her, after which she acts more affectionately towards him, saying that she does not mind being third (after Rias and Asia).^{[LN 4]} Eventually, Issei convinces her to add her fallen angel aspects to her abilities, creating the Holy Lightning attack.^{[LN 5]} She gets in a conflict with her father in volume 7 that causes her to act unstable and fragile, but Issei helps her reconcile with him.^{[LN 7]}

Over the course of the series, Akeno continues to progress her abilities. She acquires Fallen Angel Mode (堕天使モード, Datenshi Mōdo), which increases her Holy Lightning abilities, and passes the promotion exam for the middle-class devil rank.^{[LN 12]} In a later volume, she creates Raikouryuu, an Eastern dragon made of Holy Lightning.^{[LN 14]}

=== Koneko Toujou ===
Voiced by: Ayana Taketatsu (Japanese); Jad Saxton (English)

A white-haired two-tailed humanoid nekomata raised by a devil, Shirone (白音) has to witness her master being killed in self-defense at the hands of Kuroka, who becomes a stray devil. Sentenced to death for her crimes, Shirone is rescued by Sirzechs Lucifer and Rias takes her in, giving her the name Koneko Toujou (塔城 小猫, Tōjō Koneko).^{[LN 5]} Koneko eventually becomes a first-year student at Kuoh Academy. Issei describes Koneko as petite with a loli-face, a mascot character admired by both boys and girls.^{[S1 ep 2]} Her position in Rias's group is the rook, where she withstands crushing forces and can throw heavy objects with little effort.^{[S1 ep 3]} Although she is quiet and cool-headed, rarely showing emotion, she is often irritated with Issei's perverted tactics.^{[LN 5]} Her familiar is a small white cat named Shiro (シロ).^{[S1 ep 7]} Ishibumi discussed Koneko's identity with his editor, but it was not fleshed out for over a year until Volume 5.^{[LN 5 afterword]} Eventually, Koneko started to develop feelings for Issei after he helped her overcome her fears of using Senjutsu and told her that he was not afraid of her, and he would stop her if she ever went out of control, giving Koneko the courage to accept her true self.

=== Yuuto Kiba ===
Voiced by: Kenji Nojima (Japanese); Sean O'Connor (English)

Yuto Kiba (木場 祐斗, Kiba Yūto) is a blond-haired second-year student and the school's top prince.^{[LN 22]} He serves as the knight on Rias's team.^{[S1 ep 3]} His Sacred Gear,Sword Birth (Note: 魔剣創造(ソード・バース), Sōdo Bāsu) lets him generate swords with various properties for their blades, such as Holy Eraser (a blade that devours light) or Flame Delete (an ice blade that negates fire attacks). He can also generate a large number of blades from the ground to pierce enemies or give him more options in combat.^{[S1 ep 11]} Ishibumi created Yuto to add appeal to the female readers of his series,^{[LN 4 afterword]} and has him develop as the ace of the team as well as a strong backing character for Issei.^{[LN 5 afterword]}

Yuto is the sole child survivor of the Holy Sword Project, which tries to develop children that can wield the Holy Swords that can destroy devils. He nearly dies from escaping the destruction of the children, but is saved by Rias, and becomes her servant.^{[S2 ep 2]} Hoping to avenge the death of his comrades, he seeks to destroy the Holy Sword Excalibur's remnants.^{[S2 ep 3]} During his battle against Kokabiel and Freed Sellzen, he receives a crystal that contains the souls of his comrades from the project's leader Valper Galilei, and uses it to make his ultimate Balance Breaker sword form called Sword of Betrayer, (Note: 双覇の聖魔剣(ソード・オブ・ビトレイヤー), Sōdo obu Bitoreiyā) which has both Holy and Demonic attributes.^{[S2 ep 5]}

Ishibumi purposely gave light novel volume 3 a boy's love–themed title as that story focused mainly on Yuto.^{[LN 3 afterword]} Following the battle, he acts more friendly towards Issei, although some of his statements make Issei uncomfortable.^{[S2 ep 7]} Yuto's familiar is a small bird, but Issei refuses to express further interest in the topic.^{[S1 ep 7]}

In volume 12, Yuto defeats Siegfried after the latter's demonic sword Gram accepts him as his new master. Other demonic swords choose Yuto, and he is also officially promoted to the middle-class devil rank.^{[LN 12]} However, in volume 17, he has difficulty controlling Gram.^{[LN 17]}. Following Akeno's graduation, he becomes Vice-President of the Occult Research Club.^{[LN 18]}

=== Xenovia Quarta ===
Voiced by: Risa Taneda (Japanese); Lauren Landa (English)

Raised by a swordswoman-turned-angel named Griselda Quarta, Xenovia Quarta (ゼノヴィア・クァルタ, Zenovia Kuaruta)^{[LN 19]} becomes an exorcist and member of the Catholic Church. Along with her partner Irina Shido, they are sent to retrieve or destroy the stolen Excalibur swords. She has blue hair with part of her hair dyed green and is first seen wearing traditional Christian clothing.^{[S2 ep 2]}^{[S2 ep 3]} When Xenovia discovers that the God of the church no longer exists, she is exiled from the church as a heretic, becomes a devil for Rias's team as a knight, and joins the school in Issei's year.^{[S2 ep 6]} She reconciles with Asia Argento for her misdeeds towards her during their first encounter and they become friends soon after. Xenovia later moves into the Hyoudou residence,^{[LN 4]} Like most of the other girls, she is head over heels in love with Issei, even going so far as to seduce him by telling him she wants to make a baby with him because they both have strong genetics. She at one point even tried to rope Issei into a threesome with her and Asia.^{[S2 ep 7]}

Xenovia uses the Holy Sword;Excalibur Destruction (Note: 破壊の聖剣(エクスカリバー・デストラクション), Eksukaribā Desutorakushon) however, during the battle against Kokabiel, she brings out the Holy Sword Durandal, allowing her to cut through anything. A natural Holy Sword user, she possesses the genes that enable her to wield a Holy Sword instead of having them implanted as with Freed and Irina.^{[S2 ep 5]} she has her Durandal sword fused with some of the Excalibur fragments to create Ex-Durandal, (Note: エクスデュランダル, Ekusu-Dyurandaru) which is able to transform into one of the seven Excaliburs.^{[LN 9]} When Cao Cao shatters Ex-Durandal, she repairs with the final Excalibur fragment from Arthur Pendragon,^{[LN 12]} and masters the powers of six of the seven Excaliburs.^{[LN 14]} Following Sona's graduation,^{[LN 17]} Xenovia is eventually appointed to the student council as its president.^{[LN 19]} Ishibumi describes Xenovia as "a troublesome girl because she does things she doesn't understand herself which she regrets afterwards." and that Issei calls her a girl who a person cannot "grasp a hold of".^{[LN 3 afterword]}

=== Irina Shido ===
Voiced by: Maaya Uchida (Japanese); Kristi Kang (English)

Irina Shido (紫藤 イリナ, Shidō Irina) is a Church follower and Issei's childhood friend. Ishibumi developed her as a character that represented someone on the Heaven/Church side of the three factions.^{[LN 3 afterword]} She was a tomboy who has since styled her hair into twintails. She bears the Holy Sword Excalibur Mimic, (Note: 擬態の聖剣(エクスカリバー・ミミック), Eskukaribā Mimikku) which transforms itself into any shape its user desires. Although she is saddened that Issei has become a devil, she still has feelings for him.^{[S2 ep 2]}^{[S2 ep 3]} In the storyline involving the Grigori, Irina is defeated by Freed Sellzen, and her Excalibur Mimic is taken.^{[S2 ep 4]} She is sent to the Church headquarters to recover,^{[S2 ep 6]} and returns as a representative of the Church to support Michael at the summit.^{[LN 4]} She reappears in Volume 6 where she joins Xenovia and Asia as a group which Issei calls the "Church Trio" (教会トリオ, Kyōkai Torio).^{[LN 6 afterword]}

Like Xenovia, she sometimes shows a lack of common sense: in one early instance, she spends her and Xenovia's money on a fake painting of a saint, and ends up having to beg for food.^{[LN 3]} In another instance, when Xenovia and Asia are seducing Issei; she proclaims that it is too dirty, but clarifies that she meant the location rather than the act itself.^{[S3 ep 6]} Regardless, she is attracted to Issei and is concerned whether having Issei's babies will put her at risk of being a fallen angel.

As of volume 6, she becomes an angel with the Ace ranking, which allows her to throw spears of light. She also moves into Issei's residence.^{[LN 6]} In Volume 17, she gains a second pair of wings,^{[LN 17]} and later obtains her own Holy Sword, Hauteclere.^{[LN 18]}

=== Gasper ===
Voiced by: Ayane Sakura (Japanese); Alison Viktorin (English)

Gasper Bloody (ギャスパー・ヴラディ, Gyasupā Vuradi, alt. "Gasper Vladi") is a cross-dressing dhamphir, a half-vampire boy who is a bishop on Rias's team.^{[LN 4]}.^{[LN 4]} His Sacred Gear, Forbidden Balor View (Note: 停止世界の邪眼(フォービドウン・バロール・ビュー), Fōbidoun Barōru Byū), lets him freeze time whatever is in his field of vision, but because he is unable to control it, he is sealed in a remote room in the school, and acts as a shut-in.^{[S2 ep 9]} Ishibumi notes that Gasper's being a cross-dressing, vampire, shut-in gave him a lot of material to work with.^{[LN 4 afterword]}

As a child of a Vampire Lord and a human woman, Gasper is frequently ridiculed by the Vampires, including those in his clan.^{[S2 ep 9]} Combined with his shyness and Sacred Gear, he tends to hide a lot and not make friends.^{[S2 ep 9]} After the club rescues him from the clutches of Cattleya Leviathan, he becomes more open to attending school, although he sometimes hides his face under a paper bag or hides in a cardboard box. He is able to control his power better after drinking Issei's blood.^{[LN 4]}

In Volume 12 when he heard about Issei's death from Georg, who mocked Issei's sacrifice, this caused Gasper to undergo a change where he created an enormous amount of darkness that literally devoured everything (even the mist created by Dimension Lost, although where anything devoured "went" is unknown), which allows him to defeat Georg. These shadows are capable of turning into grotesque parodies of creatures.^{[LN 12]}

In Volume 16, Gasper returns to his birthplace to meet up with Rias and Yuto who were confined in the Tepes Castle. He was then reunited with his childhood friend, Valerie, who became the new "King" of the Tepes Clan, but was greatly saddened to see her mentally broken due to overusing the Longinus, Sephiroth Graal, caused by Marius Tepes. Angered and disgusted by Marius and the Vampires that made use of Valerie, Gasper's hidden power awakens and he killed Marius and the Vampires that supported him. It is revealed that he was born with a fragment of the consciousness of the original god Balor, and created a different aspect of him, called Forbidden Invade Balor the Beast. Its power is so great that has the potential to become the 14th Longinus. ^{[LN 16]}

=== Azazel ===
Voiced by: Rikiya Koyama (Japanese); Phil Parsons (English)

Azazel (アザゼル, Azazeru) is the Governor-General of the fallen angels. He is interested in the Sacred Gears and collects a vast number of them to study.^{[S2 ep 4]} In the anime series, he introduces himself as a regular patron of Issei, asking him to accompany him for drinks or to play video games. However, he formally introduces himself halfway into the second anime series.^{[S2 ep 6]} He becomes the club's advisor and a teacher at Kuoh.^{[LN 4]} Ishibumi created Azazel with the role of a coach, so that he does not participate in Rating Games, and also, along with Yuto Kiba, appeal to the female readers of his series. He also uses him as a "strong and cool explanation character." ^{[LN 4 afterword]}.

According to Sirzechs Lucifer, Azazel dislikes fighting, which was the reason why the Fallen Angels were the first to retreat from the war. He is very laid back and relaxed, He meets up with the leaders of the Devils and Angels to form a truce. While fighting with Cattleya Leviathan, Azazel is forced to cut off his arm in self-defense and replaces it with a prosthetic arm made from his Sacred Gear research. Azazel has a self-made artificial Sacred Gear that is used to seal Fafnir, the Golden Dragon and one of the five Dragon Kings.

Azazel's artificial Sacred Gear, Down Fall Dragon Spear (Note: 墮天龍の閃光槍(ダウン・フォール・ドラゴン・スピア), Daun Fōru Doragon Supia), takes the form of a jewel, as its core and its exterior are fragile, and forcefully activates its Balance Breaker, the Down Fall Dragon Another Armor (Note: 墮天龍の鎧(ダウン・フォール・ドラゴン・アナザー・アーマー), Daun Fōru Doragon Anazā Āmā; lit. "Armor of the Fallen Dragon"), which creates a Golden Dragon Armor that is similar to Issei and Vali's Scale Mail. He also has a second artificial Sacred Gear called the Blazer Shining Aura Darkness Blade (Note: 閃光と暗黒の龍絶剣(ブレイザー・シャイニング・オア・ダークネス・ブレード), Bureizā Shainingu Oa Dākunesu Burēdo; lit. "Dragon-Slicing Sword of Light and Darkness").

In Volume 12, Azazel resigns from his post as Governor-General of the Fallen Angels, which is now succeeded by Shemhazai, and became Grigori's Advisor of Special Technology and supervisor for Issei's town.^{[LN 12]}

=== Rossweisse ===
Voiced by: Ai Kakuma (Japanese); Mallorie Rodak (English)

Rossweisse (ロスヴァイセ, Rosuvaise) is a silver-haired Valkyrie who excels in Norse magic, first appearing in Volume 5 of the light novels, and in the third anime series. She wears white armor or a business suit. Introduced as Odin's bodyguard, Rossweisse always prevents him from doing dirty things; however in retaliation, Odin always teases her for being a Valkyrie that has no boyfriend. Eventually, after the battle with Loki and Fenrir, Odin leaves her in Issei's town and later gets persuaded by Rias to become her servant, her ranking being "Rook" alongside Koneko, and remains in Kuoh Academy as a teacher.

Unlike most of the female characters who already have a crush on Issei, she is still figuring out if she likes him or not. She is extremely bitter on the fact that she does not have a boyfriend and gets angry when she is made fun of for that. Odin uses this several times to knock the wind out of her when she is protesting or interfering with him doing something vulgar. She has a tendency to buy things at sales when they're cheap, allowing Issei to coin for her the nickname "The 100-Yen Shop Valkyrie" (100均ヴァルキリー). This also shows during the Kyoto trip when Issei used dress break on her so he could peep on the female students in the hot springs by her getting mad and lecturing him about destroying her clothes before being embarrassed about being naked. She moves into the Hyoudou Residence in Volume 8. She left to train with a Norse mage she knows in Volume 11 and returns in Volume 12 after learning new, powerful defensive spells along with how to combine them with the defensive traits of Rook. Thus, gaining enough power to defend against Balance Breakers and even the equivalent of 10x the damage that Heracles' Balance Breaker can create.

In Volume 14 both the Gremory and Sitri groups are surprised to hear her speak in an unpolished, country voice while talking to her grandmother in her homeland. Also, its noted that part of the reason she is so concerned about money is that she has been sending money over to her grandmother, to help out since the area her hometown is in is described as having nothing and essentially barren. She is currently pursuing two goals, the first is to create a school to teach devils how to become Valkyries, and the second is to open a discount store that carries everything in her homeland. In Volume 17 she asks Issei to pretend to be her boyfriend to convince her grandmother Göndul that she is safe in her new life as a devil and as teacher. During her date with Issei, she mentions that when she was a student she wrote an essay that could show a way of sealing the Trihexa (666). Sona invites her to be an expositor at the inauguration of her school and even offers her a position as teacher in a few years. Euclid Lucifuge tries to kidnap her not only for the information, but also because he sees her as a replacement for his sister Grayfia. She helps Issei defeat him and it becomes clear that she has finally fallen in love with him.

=== Ravel Phoenix ===
Voiced by: Asuka Nishi (Japanese); Brittney Karbowski (English)

Ravel Phoenix (レイヴェル・フェニックス, Reiveru Fenikkusu) is the blonde-haired younger sister of Riser and a former member of his team.^{[S1 ep 11]} She first appears in volume 2 of the light novels as a bishop who has yet to reveal her true powers.^{[LN 2]} She follows her brother in the belief that no one could defeat him. After witnessing Riser's defeat, she becomes infatuated with Issei (albeit with tsundere tendencies), and later transfers to his school so she can spend more time with him.^{[LN 10]} Ishibumi notes that Ravel's popularity with readers after volume 6 prompted him to make her a main character.^{[LN 6 afterword]}

When Ravel was young she developed a great fondness for the hero stories that her butler told her. As a result, she dreamed of becoming a woman who could become a support for her ideal hero but as she grew older she slowly forgot this dream. Watching Issei fight for the sake of the woman he loves at Riser's engagement party reminded Ravel of her forgotten dream and instilled a desire to understand everything about him.

As the story develops, she falls in love with him completely, and does not mind becoming his concubine so long as she can be with him. She is currently a "free" bishop: her mother (who does not participate in Rating Games) traded one of her unused bishop pieces to Riser for Ravel. She has later traded herself to become one of Issei's Bishops when he has gained peerage, as she wanted to be of use to Issei. She moves into the Hyoudou Residence in Volume 10 and enrolls in Kuoh Academy as a first-year student, alongside Koneko and Gasper. She is in Koneko's class at school and despite the two of them bickering often (paying homage to the vitriolic relationship between cats and birds, given their species), they are very close friends. Currently, she is one of Issei's managers (alongside Grayfia) and had been tutoring him so that he is able to pass the written part of the exam to become a Middle-Class Devil. During the events of Volume 12, the Phoenix family indicates that not only are they going to allow her to "stay" at Issei's house to "attend school", they are also hoping that she enters into an intimate relationship with Issei (for various reasons).

=== Ophis ===
Voiced by: Suzuko Mimori (Japanese); Megan Shipman (English)

Ophis (オーフィス, Ōfisu), known as Ouroboros Dragon (Note: 無限の龍神(ウロボロス・ドラゴン), Uroborosu Doragon) and the Infinite Dragon God (Note: 無限の龍神, Mugen no Ryūshin), is a dragon that is said to be more powerful than God and the devil kings;^{[S2 ep 12]} she also has the ability to transform into a black-haired humanoid. She organized the Chaos Brigade with the hopes of getting rid of Great Red from the Dimensional Gap. However, she was betrayed by Cao Cao who stole her power under the intention of creating another Ophis, rendering her in a presumed powerless state. Cao Cao, however, underestimated her, as she has released her powers in forms of snakes before Cao Cao came to steal her powers. As such, she did not lose most of her powers. Like Great Red, Ophis does not like to interfere in the matters of the world, having interest only in Great Red. As such, she is more of a figurehead than a leader of the Chaos Brigade, and any plans or acts not pertaining to Great Red were by the will of the members, not hers.

In Volume 12, she is rescued by Great Red and helped him in restoring Issei's body. The two seem interested in Issei, and both were saying "Zoom Zoom Iyaaan" after the battle with the Jabberwocky to Issei and Ddraig's dismay. Although she does not say it, she is probably very fond of Issei, as he is her first friend and had offered her a home in his house in Volume 11. This is a big deal as she had helped protect Asia and Irina later in the volume simply because they had tea and played cards together. According to Issei, Ophis is not evil, just naïve and did not mind being used by the Chaos Brigade, as they had promised to kill Great Red for her. Currently, the faction heads have used numerous seals to hide her presence. This is to avoid upsetting members of their factions and hide her from the remaining members of the Chaos Brigade. Even with the power stolen from her, they are aware that she is too powerful to control, but are allowing her to stay with Issei to encourage the interest she seems to be showing for him. She later moves into the Hyoudou Residence at the end of Volume 12 to continue "observing" Issei, saying she has a vested interest in him as a part of her was used to recreate Issei's body with Great Red's flesh. Currently, she seems to be welcoming the feeling of having an actual home and friends, even to the point of not attempting to do any significant damage to Great Red other than kicking him during the time she and Issei were riding his back.

== Devils ==
Devils (悪魔, Akuma) represent one of the three major supernatural groups (the others being the fallen angels and the angels in a three-way struggle over the control of the world). Because of the great war hundreds of years ago, the devils have become few in number, so they have organized themselves by a feudal system in which the higher-ranked devils lead a small group of up to 15 servants, each of whom is designated by a piece in the game of chess, and has enormous powers. The servants are lower-ranked devils, some of whom are made from humans. However, if a devil were to free themselves from their master they are known as a stray devil and are to be executed.^{[LN 1]} The devils overall are led by the Four Great Devils (四大魔王, Yondai Maō; also Four Devil Kings), who are titled by devil names from folklore.^{[LN 3]}

=== Sona Sitri ===
Voiced by: Natsumi Takamori (Japanese); Marie Charlson (English)
Sona Sitri (ソーナ・シトリー, Sōna Shitorī), known as Sona Shitori (支取 蒼那, Shitori Sōna) in school, is a black-haired glass-wearing student council president and the third most popular girl behind Rias and Akeno. As a devil of the Sitri family, she is Rias's childhood friend and rival.^{[S1 ep 7]} Her Evil Pieces initially consist of girls, except for Genshiro Saji, who is the only male. She specializes in using water-based magic, which is accentuated when near large bodies of water. In Rating Games, she uses a "technique" strategy which is effective against the power-type strategies employed by Rias.^{[LN 14]} Following her graduation, she realizes her dream of opening Aurea Academy, a Rating Games school for devils regardless of their rank and status. However, the school is attacked by the Hexennacht during an open house event.^{[LN 17]}
Sona's Evil Pieces include council members Tsubaki Shinra (queen) and Genshiro Saji (pawn). She also has: Tsubasa Yura (Note: 由良 翼紗, Yura Tsubasa) (rook); Tomoe Meguri (Note: 巡 巴柄, Meguri Tomoe) (knight); Momo Hanakai (Note: 花戒 桃, Hanakai Momo) (bishop); Reya Kusaka (Note: 草下 憐耶, Kusaka Reya) (bishop); Ruruko Nimura (Note: 仁村 留流子, Nimura Ruruko) (pawn); Loup Garou (Note: ルー・ガルー, Rū Garū) (rook), who is a werewolf magician; and Bennia (Note: ベンニーア, Bennīa) (knight), who is half-Grim Reaper.^{[LN 14]}

=== Genshiro Saji ===
Voiced by: Yūichi Iguchi (Japanese); Kyle Phillips (English)
Genshiro Saji (匙 元士郎, Saji Genshirō) is the Student Council Secretary and Sona's Pawn who became a Devil through the use of four Pawn pieces used by the latter.^{[ S1 ep 7]} He is in love with Sona, expressing a desire to sleep with her and "accidentally" impregnate her so that they would get married. He is very supportive of Sona's dreams, stating that her dreams are his dreams. So much so that in the Rating Game with the Occult Research Club, he tapped into his life force to power up his abilities and inflict serious damage on Issei before losing their one-on-one duel, but gaining recognition from the VIPs watching the Game. He plans on helping fulfill Sona's dream by becoming a teacher. However, he is extremely jealous of Issei's relationship with his master, Rias, being called by name by Sona, and having ecchi encounters with beautiful girls while he (Saji) is not even registering on Sona's radar as a potential boyfriend.
He is in possession of a Sacred Gear called Absorption Line (Note: 黒い龍脈(アブソーブション・ライン), Absōrpushon Rain),^{[S2 ep 4]} which holds the soul of Vritra, the Black Dragon and one of the Five Dragon Kings. One of Absorption Line's abilities is to fire a rope to grab someone.^{[S2 ep 4]} Originally it was split up into four individual pieces with him only having a portion of it, but eventually Azazel gathers all the pieces and combines them together for Saji. His three remaining Sacred Gears are "Blaze Black Flare" (邪龍の黒炎(ブレイズ・ブラック・フレア), Bureizu Burakku Furea; lit. "Evil Dragon's Black Flame"), "Delete Field" (漆黒の領域(デリート・フィールド), Derīto Fīrudo; lit. "Domain of Darkness"), and "Shadow Prison" (龍の牢獄(シャドウ・プリズン), Shadō Purizun; lit. "Dragon Prison"). Saji is far from being able to control the power of Vritra, and would usually go out of control when used extensively. In Volume 7, it is revealed that Saji can enter into a Dragon King form called "Vritra Promotion" (龍王変化(ヴリトラ・プロモーション), Vuritora Promōshon; lit. "Dragon King Transformation"). However, while he does start conversing with Vritra like Issei talks with Ddraig, he can only handle so much power for so long without going berserk. Also, Vritra says Saji will go berserk if Issei uses Boost and Transfer to increase Saji's power. Fortunately for him, he is willing and able to endure grueling training and hardship to get stronger as he wants to surpass his friend, rival, and fellow Pawn Issei. In Volume 17, despite being out powered he bravely stands against the Evil Dragon Grendel. When the Magician Walburga tries to kill Sona, he takes the blow for her and as Vritra returns to help him, he finally reaches the power of the Balance Breaker, called Malebolge Vritra Promotion, that combines their minds and whose power comes from the most powerful curses of the Underworld.

=== Riser Phoenix ===
Voiced by: Takehito Koyasu (Japanese); Chris Smith (English)
Introduced as Rias' fiancé, Riser Phoenix (ライザー・フェニックス, Raizā Fenikkusu) is a high-ranking devil and the third son of the Phoenix family.^{[S1 ep 8]} He wishes to marry Rias to preserve a full-blooded devil lineage, although he enrages Issei when he shamelessly fondles his queen piece Yubelluna (Note: ユーベルーナ, Yūberūna).^{[S1 ep 8]} Rias notes that he can regenerate quickly like the creature of the same name, and has a strong record in the Rating Games; his losses so far have been on purpose to allies.^{[S1 ep 9]} Riser's Evil Pieces consist of 15 girls who are hired by him, which makes Issei envious.^{[S1 ep 8]} In addition to "Bomb Queen" Yubelluna, who uses explosive fire magic, there are: Riser's sister Ravel (bishop); Karlamine (Note: カーラマイン, Kāramain) (knight), a sword maniac who uses fire and wind attacks; Siris (Note: シーリス, Shīrisu) (knight), who wields a giant broadsword that sends shock waves; Isabela (Note: イザベラ, Izabera) (rook), who wears a mask covering half of her face;^{[LN 5]}^{[S1 ep 11]} Shueran (Note: 雪蘭(シュエラン)) (rook), who uses Chinese Kung Fu and emits flames from her hands and legs;^{[S1 ep 10]} and Mihae (Note: 美南風) (bishop). Riser's pawns include: Mira; Ile and Nel, twin sisters who wield chainsaws; Ni and Li, twin catgirls; Shulyer; Marion; and Byurent.^{[S1 ep 10]}

Although he defeats Rias in the Rating Game, he is challenged by Issei at his engagement party with Rias, and loses when Issei uses Balance Breaker Scale Mail to attack his mind (the one thing he cannot easily regenerate).^{[S1 ep 12]}. Afterwards, he falls into a slump and develops a fear of dragons. He recovers from his slump in Volume 10 of the light novels, giving advice to Rias on Rating Games and warning Issei that should he mistreat his sister Ravel, he will burn him to a crisp.^{[LN 10]} He reappears in Volume 12 alongside his brother to cheer up his sister and the Gremory Team before leaving to fight alongside his brother.^{[LN 12]}

=== Sirzechs Lucifer ===
Voiced by: Junichi Suwabe (Japanese); Alex Organ (Seasons 1–3), Christopher Wehkamp (Season 4 – present) (English)
Sirzechs Lucifer (サーゼクス・ルシファー, Sāzekusu Rushifā; anime:Sir Zechs Lucifer), nicknamed the Crimson Satan (紅髪の魔王(クリムゾン・サタン), Kurimuzon Satan) is the most powerful of the Great Devils, more so than the previous Lucifer. He is the older brother of Rias.^{[S1 ep 10]}
He is a wizard-technique type where he uses his Power of Destruction in forms of several orbs that he can control at will. When he focuses and concentrates strongly he can use a move he calls Ruin the Extinct (Note: 滅殺の魔弾(ルイン・ザ・エクスティンクト), Ruin za Ekusutinkuto; lit. "Magical Bullets of Annihilation") which only destroys his target. This is shown once when he had a sphere enter Creuserey's mouth and destroy the snake that was in his stomach, without causing any damage to Creuserey himself. As stated by Azazel, the reason why he was chosen as a devil king due to his overwhelming ability to nullify magic. However, Milicas comments during his visit to the Gremory Household that Grayfia is the strongest member of the Lucifer team (most likely because he doesn't know about his "other" form.)
In Volume 12, he goes into the front lines to protect the Underworld, where he revealed his "true form" in which he converts himself into the Power of Destruction called the Human-Shaped Aura of Destruction (Note: 人型に浮かび上がる滅びのオーラ, Hito-gata ni Ukabiagaru Horobi no Ōra) that destroys everything regardless of his will. According to Azazel, he compresses his demonic powers to the size of a human shape, and has demonic powers that are ten times more powerful than the original Lucifer. His father also mentions to Azazel that he is a Super Devil and a mutation of a Devil, possibly so different that it might be a mistake to even call him a Devil. Because of this, being a devil king was the only role for him.
He is Grayfia's husband and father of their son, Milicas Gremory.
In the English subtitles, Sirzech's name is misspelt as Sir Zechs. However in the original source material his name is officially spelt Sirzechs.
Lucifer's Evil Pieces include: Enku (Note: 炎駒, Enku) (pawn), a Chinese Qilin who escorts Grayfia and brings luck to the Hyoudou residence;^{[LN 8]}Souji Okita (Note: 沖田 総司, Okita Sōji) (knight), a reincarnation of Okita Souji who is Yuto's swordsmaster and moves at God-like speeds;^{[LN 12]} Surtr Second (Note: スルト・セカンド, Suruto Sekando) (rook) a clone of Surtr that went berserk and the Norse Gods abandoned him; Bahamut (Note: バハムート, Bahamūto) (rook) who helps transports his group but can also annihilate grunts; MacGregor Mathers (Note: マグレガー・メイザース, Maguregā Meizāsu) (bishop), a master magician; and Beowulf (Note: ベオウルフ, Beōrufu) (pawn), a descendant of the original Beowulf who is said to be among the top five pawns in the Underworld.
Lucifer's given name is a portmanteau of Gundam franchise characters Char Aznable and Zechs Merquise.

=== Grayfia Lucifuge ===
Voiced by: Saori Seto (Japanese); Krishna Smitha (Seasons 1–2), Megan Shipman (Season 3) (English)
Grayfia Lucifuge (グレイフィア・ルキフグス, Gureifia Rukifugusu) is the white-haired wife of Lucifer. She serves as the Queen in his group as well as a maid in the Gremory household.^{[S1 ep 8]} She is the mother of Milicas Gremory. Grayfia comes from the House of Lucifuge, a family of pure-blooded Devils from the Extra Demons whose family served under the original Lucifer. She is a Devil on par with the Four Maous, and is known as the "Strongest Queen". She once challenged Serafall for the spot of Leviathan. She is nicknamed the Silver-Haired Queen of Devourer (Note: 銀髪の殲滅女王(クィーン・オブ・デイバウア), Ginpatsu no Kwīn obu Deibaua; lit. "Silver-Haired Queen of Annihilation") and uses ice-based magic. For some reason, she does not appreciate having family titles or ties to the Gremory family mentioned while a maid. As a maid, she always acts in a cold, calm, and professional manner with extremely rare instances of emotions showing in her face or voice. This is because when she is a maid she wants to do it completely, which has resulted in her having a relationship with the Gremory family as a maid. One of the few instances she showed emotion was in Volume 2 during her conversation with Issei just before she gave him the magic circle to crash Riser's engagement party and release a griffin to ride home on. She acts and expects to be treated with the difference between a noble and servant, although she still reserves the right to chastise Lucifer and Millicas if they act improper or acknowledge her as part of the family and not a maid or Sirzech's Queen. She enjoys doing small tasks and housework and it seems easier to move around doing simple matters as a maid than the wife of a devil king. Every now and then, she will take a day off as a maid and become a high-class lady who is to be acknowledged as a noble lady of the Gremory Family, Sirzech's wife and Rias' older sister. While maintaining the proper demeanor of a noble lady, she does allow emotions to show on her face and is less reserved around others. So far, she has only been seen to take a day off once in the Extra Life chapter of Volume 8 in the light novels. During that chapter, she acted more friendly with everyone and even showed embarrassment over her (Grayfia's) romance with Lucifer is a legend among young, female devils and Koneko mentioning their courtship had been made into a play.

=== Serafall Leviathan ===
Voiced by: Ai Shimizu (Japanese); Tia Ballard (English)
Serafall Leviathan (セラフォルー・レヴィアタン, Seraforū Revaiatan) is Sona's older sister and one of the Four Great Devils.^{[S2 ep 5]} She is introduced as a cosplayer with a magical girl dress who visits during the school's open house.^{[S2 ep 8]} This prompts Issei to coin her the nickname "Maou Shoujo" (魔王少女, MaŌ Shōjo; lit. "Satan Girl"). She has a deep sister complex, going as far as threatening to attack Heaven for not being informed of the school's open house by her little sister. Adding to her childlike personality, she calls Sona "So-tan" (ソーたん, Sō-tan) and refers to others with the "-chan" honorific. She is the devil king in charge of foreign affairs (other factions). Coming from the Sitri Clan, Serafall is highly skilled in water-based magic while specializing in ice-based magic, and has an attack called "Celsius Cross Trigger" (零と雫の霧雪(セルシウス・クロス・トリガー), Serushiusu Kurosu Torigā). Despite the childlike attitude she definitely has the power to hold the position of devil king since she was able to take out a Bandersnatch all by herself. She also has her own show called "Levia-tan" in competition with the Oppai Dragon show based on Issei.

=== Tsubaki Shinra ===
Voiced by: Akiko Kimura (Japanese); Lauren Allison (English)
Tsubaki Shinra (真羅 椿姫, Shinra Tsubaki) is the Vice-President of the Student Council and Sona's Queen^{[S1 ep 7]}. Her relationship with Sona is similar to that of Rias and Akeno. She is the fourth most popular girl in the school, and also wears glasses. She is a master swordsman who faced Yuto and Xenovia on separate occasions during their Rating Game. While she manages to defeat Xenovia, she failed to gain the upper hand against Yuto by sword skills alone. Her Sacred Gear, Mirror Alice (追憶の鏡(ミラー・アリス), Mirā Arisu; lit. "Mirror of Recollection"), reflects double damage but cannot be summoned twice in a row without a cooldown period. After losing to Yuto at the Rating Game between their masters, she develops a huge crush on him. Also like him, she seems to prefer fighting with just swords and her Sacred Gear while leaving magic attacks to her group's King and Bishops. Her magic level should be higher than average as her group's Queen.

=== Sairaorg Bael ===
Voiced by: Yuichi Nakamura (Japanese); Marcus D. Stimac (English)
Sairaorg Bael (サイラオーグ・バアル, Sairaōgu Bāru) is the next heir of Bael Family and Rias' cousin. Unlike Rias and Sirzechs, Sairaorg did not inherit the Power of Destruction from his lineage. Because of this, his younger brother was the one who had been chosen to become the heir of the Bael Family. Misla encourages him to become stronger in other ways, which resulted in him training his body with martial arts, pushing himself to his utmost limits to become powerful. With this strength, he defeated his younger brother, restoring his position as the next heir. Sairoarg desires to become one of the four Maous to prove himself, as well as to prevent others from feeling the same pain he felt.

Appearing in Volume 5 during the Young Devils Gathering, he fought against Zephyrdor Glasya-Labolas in a Rating Game which he and his team won with little effort. He faced Rias in a Rating Game in Volume 10, defeating Yuto, Xenovia and Rossweisse before he and his Pawn, Regulus, challenged Rias and Issei. Sairaorg overwhelms Issei, until the latter achieved his Cardinal Crimson Promotion, where both engaged in a relentless fist fight. He later fought against Heracles in Volume 12 and easily defeated the giant. In Volume 16, he and his peerage join the DxD team to help fight the remnants of the Chaos Brigade.

Due to the extreme training that his body had endured, he gained an enormous amount of toki, a form of physical energy, and is a martial arts master. He can also utilize the Balance Breaker armor of "Regulus Nemea" (獅子王の戦斧(レグルス・ネメア), Regurusu Nemea; lit. "Axe of the Lion King"), "Regulus Rey Leather Rex" (獅子王の剛皮(レグルス・レイ・レザー・レックス), Regurusu Rei Rezā Rekkusu; lit. "Iron Skin of the Lion King"), one of the Longinus which he luckily encountered when its host died.

Sairaorg's Evil Pieces include: Regulus (レグルス, Regurusu) (Pawn), a Nemean lion whose revival consumed seven pawns; Kuisha Abaddon (クイーシャ・アバドン, Kuīsha Abadon) (Queen), who has elemental powers, ability to create holes, and reflect attacks; Gandoma Balam (ガンドマ・バラム, Gandoma Baramu) (Rook), Ladora Buné (ラードラ・ブネ, Rādora Bune) (Rook) who can transform into a dragon; Beruka Furcas (ベルーガ・フールカス, Berūka Fūrukasu) (Knight) who rides a horse; Liban Crocell (リーバン・クロセル, Rīban Kuroseru) (Knight), who manipulates gravity; Coriana Andrealphus (コリアナ・アンドレアルフス, Koriana Andorearufusu) (Bishop) who tries to counter Issei's Dress Break ability; Misteeta Sabnock (ミスティータ・サブノック, Misutīta Sabunokku), (Bishop) who can seal an opponent's ability.

=== Ajuka Beelzebub ===
Voiced by: Junichi Yanagita (Japanese); Jerry Jewell (English)
Ajuka Beelzebub (アジュカ・ベルゼブブ, Ajuka Beruzebubu), formerly known as Ajuka Astaroth (アジュカ・アスタロト, Ajuka Asutaroto), is one of the Four Great Devils; he is Diodora's older brother and the creator of the Evil Pieces system and Rating Game. Ajuka is the only Devil that can rival Sirzechs in strength. He remodeled Issei's Evil Piece that gave him the ability to activate Illegal Move Trident. Ajuka has a special ability called the Kankara Formula (覇軍の方程式(カンカラー・フォーミュラ), Kankarā Fōmyura; lit. "Equation of Military Supremacy"), which allows him to turn every phenomenon into equations and formulas and control it to make it into a special move of his own by increasing its speed and power. Ajuka is extremely powerful, as revealed in Volume 12 when he finishes off some of the servants of the Old Maou Faction who attacked him by turning their own powers against them, and it was mentioned that of the current Maous, only he and Sirzechs surpass the original ones.
He is also a Super Devil and mutation of a Devil like Sirzechs.

=== Stray devils ===
Stray devils are devils who have betrayed or killed their masters.^{[S1 ep 3]}

- Vizer (バイサー, Baisā) is a stray devil who assumes the form of a centaur and shoots acid from her breasts.^{[S1 ep 3]}
- Gentleman Alchemist (錬金術師の紳士, Renkinjutsu-shi no Shinshi)

Voiced by: Itaru Yamamoto
An unnamed Stray Devil who is an anime-exclusive character in the OVA episode "I'm Harvesting Breasts!" He was captured by the Occult Research Club and interrogated by Grayfia in the Underworld. Before being killed, he revealed that he created the Breast Chimera so that every flat-chested girl in the world would have large breasts.

- Breast Chimera

A creation of the Gentleman Alchemist and the main antagonist of the OVA episode "I'm Harvesting Breasts!" It is a plant with a Dragon-like features, and has the ability to produce breast-like fruits by feeding off spiritual energy from women's breasts, specifically the much bigger ones like Rias and Akeno's. According to Grayfia, the Gentleman Alchemist created the Breast Chimera so that every flat-chested girl in the world would have large breasts by eating its fruit. It was defeated by Rias' boosted Power of Destruction.

=== Other devils ===
Zeoticus Gremory (ジオティクス・グレモリー, Jiotikusu Guremorī)
Voiced by: Shō Hayami (Japanese); Andrew T. Chandler (English)
The father of Rias and Sirzechs and the head of the family. He is a Marquis high-ranking devil.^{[S1 ep 2]} He appears as a middle-aged man with red hair. Because he wants more pure-blooded Devil grandchildren, he pushes Rias to marry Riser; however, after Riser's defeat, he admits the errors of his ways and allows the engagement to be cancelled.

Venelana Gremory (ヴェネラナ・グレモリー, Venerana Guremorī)
Voiced by: Mari Shiraishi (Japanese); Monica Rial (English)
Known as Brunette Madame the Extinct (Note: 亜麻髪の絶滅淑女(マダム・ザ・エクスティンクト), Amagami no Madamu za Ekusutinkuto), she is the mother of Rias and Sirzechs. She has brown hair, unlike her husband, children, as well as Millicas, who have red hair. As a descendant of the Bael family, she inherits her Powers of Destruction. She can seamlessly switch her demeanor from that of a proper, young noble lady to a fierce matriarch.

Millicas Gremory (ミリキャス・グレモリー, Mirikyasu Guremorī)
Voiced by: Ari Ozawa (Japanese); Mikaela Krantz (English)
The red-haired son of Sirzechs Lucifer and Grayfia Lucifuge and Rias's nephew. Although his father is Lucifer of the Four Maous, it is not applied to Millicas, as it is required only for Sirzechs, thus Millicas' family name is Gremory and is next-in-line after Rias as family head. In the Volume 13 short story "The Worries of the Next, Next Heir" (which took place after Volume 12), it is shown that he has inherited Sirzechs' Power of Destruction when he had a training match with Issei during his stay at Issei's house. It is still unknown if he inherited any powers of the Lucifuge family from Grayfia. Millicas's name is derived from Gundam characters Zechs Merquise and Char Aznable's real names Milliardo and Casval.

Lord Phoenix (フェニックス卿, Fenikkusu-kyō)
Ruval, Riser, and Ravel's father and current head of the Phoenix Family. He talked with Rias' father after the defeat of his son at the hand of Issei, feeling pleased because it taught Riser that the Phoenix Family's power of immortality is not absolute.

Lady Phoenix
Ruval, Riser, and Ravel's mother and the matrarch of the Phoenix Family who appeared in Volume 10. She asked Issei and Rias to take care of Ravel, and told Issei that her daughter is currently a "free" Bishop.

Ruval Phoenix (ルヴァル・フェニックス, Ruvuaru Fenikkusu)
The eldest son of the Phoenix family and next heir to the house. He is one of the top ten rankers in the Rating Game and is soon to be promoted as an Ultimate-Class Devil. He appears in Volume 12 along with Riser to cheer his sister and the Gremory Team, who were in shock at Issei's death, before leaving to fight against the monsters created by Annihilation Maker. While there, he also dropped off a few bottles of Phoenix Tears to help those wounded fighting the Chaos Brigade.

Lord Bael
The current head of the Bael Family known as the "Great King" and Sairaorg's father. He was disappointed at Sairaorg for not inheriting the Baels' Power of Destruction. Has two wives and is Venelana's half-brother.

Misla Bael (ミスラ・バアル, Misura Bāru)
The mother of Sairaorg, originally from the Vapula Family (ウァプラ家, Vapura Ke). She was in a comatose state a few years prior to the story. The Bael Family considered her and Sairaorg as failures because of Sairaorg not inheriting the Power of Destruction. Before her coma, she made Sairaorg promise her that he will become stronger than anyone, which later became Sairaorg's drive to become a Maou. She wakes up from her coma at the end of Volume 10.

Diodora Astaroth (ディオドラ・アスタロト, Diodora Asutaroto)
Voiced by: Makoto Furukawa (Japanese); Aaron Dismuke (English)
The heir to the House of Astaroth and Ajuka's younger brother. He is the Devil that caused Asia's excommunication from the Church and accusation of her being a heretic. After he revealed that he is an ally of the Chaos Brigade, it is further revealed by Freed that Diodora has a nun fetish and that all his servants are nuns and maidens that he acquired all over the world. That he'd seduce them away from the Church and then rape them, while recording it, when they were under his control. Seeing their complete despair and hopelessness makes it all the more enjoyable for him. He purposely injured himself so Asia, being extremely kind, would heal him so she'd get kicked out of the Church (Healing ability that can heal Fallen Angels and Devils is considered blasphemy) in order to get an opportunity to make her his servant. Originally he planned to 'rescue' Asia after Raynare killed her so he'd have the excuse to turn her into a Devil while appearing to be the 'good guy.' He despises Issei for, in his terms, "stealing Asia from him", and attempts to kill him, but was defeated by the latter before Shalba Beelzebub fatally shot him with a light weapon.

Diehauser Belial (ディハウザー・ベリアル, Dihauzā Beriaru)
The current head of the House of Belial and the number one-ranking Rating Game champion. He has dominated the Rating Game for a very long time, and is popularly known as "The Emperor" (皇帝, Kōtei) to everyone. His powers are said to be on par with a Maou. He was one of the spectators at Rias and Sairaorg's Rating Game, complimenting Issei and Sairaorg for their magnificent fight. After Beelzebub created new formulas to allow attacks from Devils to work, Diehauser led the first group to successfully defeat a Bandersnatch. In Volume 17 he betrays the Three Factions and in secret sides with Rizevim Livan Lucifer.

Seekvaira Agares (シーグヴァイラ・アガレス, Shīguvarira Agaresu)
Voiced by: Yuna Yoshino (Japanese); Jennifer Green (English)
Heiress of the Agares Clan and one of the "Rookies Four" alongside Rias, Sona and Sairorg. In Volume 16 she joins the DxD and has shown displeasure with the fact that the Vali Team will be joining the aforementioned group. An excellent tactician, Seekvaira is a mecha otaku.

Mephisto Pheles (メフィスト・フェレス, Mefisuto Feresu)
A Devil from the Extra Demons who has been active since the time of the previous Four Great Satans. However, he is a Liberalist, so he didn't get along with the previous Satans. He is the current director for the Magician Council, and is Tannin's King. The Longinus (Absolute Demise) possessor is a member of his organization.

Fallbium Asmodeus (ファルビウム・アスモデウス, Farubiumu Asumodeusu),
Formerly known as Falbium Glasya-Labolas (ファルビウム・グラシャラボラス, Farubiumu Gurasha-Raborasu) of the House of Glasya-Labolas, is one of the Four Great Devils. He is known for being a great strategist and has gathered many talented subordinates. As such, he is the one maintaining military affairs in the Underworld. However, he is also known to be lazy and constantly leaves his work to his subordinates.

Zekram Bael (ゼクラム・バアル, Zekuramu Bāru)
The very first Head of House Bael, whose influence is even greater than the current Four Great Satans. Zekram made his first appearance in Volume 18 when he summoned Rias to explain the matters regarding the former Devil that was in charge of Kuoh Town. He told Rias and the members of Occult Research Club that he ordered, with the permission of the Heaven and the Church, the death of the exorcist Masaomi Yaegaki and the High-Class Devil Cleria Belial, who were in a relationship. It was so to maintain the status quo that both sides do not want to disturb.

== Other groups and organizations ==
=== Fallen angels ===
Fallen angels (堕天使, Datenshi) are angels who used to serve God but because of their corrupt emotions, have descended into the underworld, and battle against the devils.^{[S1 ep 2]} Their appearances are similar to those of the angels, albeit with black wings and lacking a halo above their head. Even though they have been cast out from Heaven, fallen angels have somehow retained the ability to use light-based weapons. However, they receive damage like devils do if they pray to God. The Grigori (グリゴリ, Gurigori) is a group of fallen angels and humans also known as the Ones Who Watch Over the Children of God.^{[S2 ep 3]} Members include humans exiled from the Church and Sacred Gear wielders. Like devils, they mainly live in the Underworld.

Raynare (レイナーレ, Reināre)
Voiced by: Hitomi Nabatame (Japanese); Felecia Angelle (English)
Raynare is a fallen angel who is Issei's first antagonist. Under the disguise of schoolgirl Yuma Amano (天野 夕麻, Amano Yūma; Yuuma Amano), she asks to be Issei's girlfriend at the start of the series, but stabs him in the abdomen with a spear of light at the end of their first date.^{[LN 1]} She returns to capture Asia Argento to absorb her Sacred Gear, Twilight Healing.^{[S1 ep 4]} However, Issei and his allies eventually attack Raynare before she is killed by Rias.^{[S1 ep 5]} Despite being killed off early, her actions have deeply affected Issei, causing him to be afraid of expressing his feelings towards Rias or the other girls due to reminding him of her, until Akeno, Koneko and Asia successfully help him fix his broken heart and regain his self-confidence by professing their love for him and that they will never betray him like Raynare, and she is erased from his heart forever.

Supporting Raynare are the following fallen angels: Dohnaseek (ドーナシーク, Dōnashīku), who dresses in a trenchcoat and fedora;^{[S1 ep 1]} Kalawarner (カラワーナ, Karawāna), a blue-haired woman in a minidress who is the first one to be hit by Issei's Sacred Gear attack;^{[S1 ep 2]} and Mittelt (ミッテルト, Mitteruto), who has blonde hair dresses as a Gothic Lolita.^{[S1 ep 4]} The fallen angels are eventually killed by Rias.^{[S1 ep 5]}

Kokabiel (コカビエル, Kokabieru)
Voiced by: Hiroki Yasumoto (Japanese); Charles Clegg (English)
Kokabiel is the long-haired fallen angel leader of the Grigoris. He steals the Excalibur swords in hopes of starting another war among the angels, devils, and fallen angels.^{[S2 ep 4]} After injuring Irina, the Occult Research Club and the student council fight Kokabiel. Although he easily defeats Rias's team, Issei hits his face. Azazel has Vali Lucifer intervene and subdue Kokabiel.^{[S2 ep 6]} Azazel eventually seals Kokabiel in the deepest part of the Underworld, Cocytus. He is the one who reveals to Rias, Xenovia and the others that God and the Four Devil Kings had died in the previous great war.^{[S2 ep 6]}

Shemhazai (シェムハザ, Shemuhaza)
Shemhazai is introduced as the Vice-Governor-General of the Fallen Angels and Grigori, and Azazel's right-hand man. He has a devil wife, and is expecting to have a child some time in the future. In Volume 12, he becomes Governor General of the Fallen Angels after Azazel stepped down from his post.^{[LN 12]}

Baraqiel (バラキエル, Barakieru)
Voiced by: Tetsu Inada (Japanese); Kent Williams (English)
Baraqiel is one of the leaders of the fallen angels and Grigori. He is a friend of Azazel, and is revealed to be Akeno Himejima's father.^{[S2 ep 6]} He uses Lightning and Thunder abilities. He is protective of his daughter, and initially resents Issei due to his misconception on Issei being "a Dragon that devours breasts", which was caused by Azazel who said that as a joke. He meets Akeno's mother, Shuri Himejima, after he is injured and Shuri rescues him. In Volume 12, Baraqiel takes over Shemhaza's position as Vice Governor General after Shemhaza was promoted to Governor General.^{[LN 12]}

=== Angels ===
Angels (天使, Tenshi) are the beings from Heaven, which in Ishibumi's DxD world, supports all the religions, including the Church that Asia and Xenovia were part of.^{[LN 6 afterword]} They have the powers to inflict pain upon devils due to their light-based powers. They have white wings (golden wings for Archangels) and a halo above their head. During the great war between the three factions (angels, fallen angels and devils), God and the original Four Devil Kings die. The angels are unable to increase their numbers^{[S2 ep 6]} until the creation of the Brave Saints (Note: 御使い(ブレイブ・セイント), Bureibu Seinto; lit. "Royal Users") system which reincarnates humans into angels and assigns them positions associated with playing cards, much like the devils and their Evil Pieces. Meanwhile, the archangel Michael takes over maintenance of the system and keeps it a secret from the followers of the Church.^{[S2 ep 6]}

Michael
Voiced by: Yoshimasa Hosoya (Japanese); Aaron Roberts (English)
Michael is the leader of the Angels and Seraphim in Heaven, and the only one called "Archangel". He is God's very first creation, and serves as the current "God" after the original one died in the war. He appears in volume 4 of the light novels to give Issei the Holy Sword Ascalon, the Dragon Slayer sword that was wielded by St. George. Like Azazel, he has twelve wings growing from his back, and unlike other Angels whose wings are white, his wings are colored gold, further symbolizing his position as leader. His current goal is to recreate the lost members of Heaven, and has reincarnated Irina Shindo and Dulio Gesualdo as his Ace and Joker. His suit in the Brave Saints system is the Suit of Spades.

Gabriel (ガブリエル, Gaburieru)
Michael's sister, has 12 pure white wings, is a Seraphim and the strongest female Angel in Heaven, as well as the most beautiful. According to Irina, she is also a popular figure in the underworld. She appears in the side story "Armageddon at Sports Day", a sports day school event between the three factions. Her suit in the Brave Saints system is the Suit of Hearts.

Dulio Gesualdo (デュリオ・ジェズアルド, Dyurio Jezuarudo)
Reincarnated as an Angel under Michael, a former exorcist who has the Brave Saint position of "Joker" and has 10 pure white wings. He is known to be the strongest exorcist ever capable of taking on High-class Devils and monsters alone, and possesses the second-strongest Longinus, Zenith Tempest (Note: 煌天雷獄(ゼニス・テンペスト), Zenisu Tenpesuto; lit. "Prison of Bright Heavenly Thunder"), which have the ability to control the weather as well as its attribute. He is, in fact, so skilled that he is considered as a candidate to become a Seraph. Dulio, however, is known to be a carefree person, and is currently traveling around the world in his quest to savor good cuisines. He appears in Volume 12, freezing up all of Hades' Grim Reapers. In Volume 16, Dulio became the leader of the counter terrorist group, D×D.

Griselda Quarta (グリゼルダ・クァルタ, Gurizeruda Kwaruta)
A reincarnated Angel, she is Gabriel's Queen and Xenovia's swordmaster who is one of Heaven's supervisors. She is also one of the top five female exorcists in Heaven. Also Irina's superior. In Volume 16 she also joins the DxD counter terrorist group.

=== Mythological deities ===
Some of the deities associated with mythology make appearances in the series:

- Zeus (ゼウス, Zeusu) is the leader of the Gods of Greek mythology.^{[LN 10]}
- Poseidon (ポセイドン) appears in a side story where he wields a Trident to control the sea.^{[LN 10]}
- Hades (ハーデス, Hādesu) is the God of the Realm of the Dead and the true mastermind behind the Chaos Brigade. He commands a legion of Grim Reapers. He is stronger than Michael, Azazel and the current Maous combined. Hades gets along well with humans but despises the Devils and Fallen Angels. However, Lucifer and Beelzebub are the only two Maous that can currently fight him. His body consists of only bones and gives out a creepy aura. Voiced by: Masuo Amada (Japanese); Robert McCollum (English).
- Pluto (プルート, Purūto) is a Grim Reaper under Hades.^{[LN 12]}
- Odin (オーディン, Ōdin) is a perverted yet nonetheless powerful God who wields the legendary spear Gungnir in battle.^{[LN 5]} Voiced by: Shinpachi Tsuji (Japanese); R Bruce Elliott (English).
- Loki (ロキ, Roki) comes to Issei's town to create Ragnarok but is defeated by the combined effort of the Gremory and Vali Team. After his defeat, he was placed under many layers of sealing. Voiced by: Takayuki Kondō (Japanese); John Burgmeier (English).
- Indra (インドラ, Indora), from Hindu mythology, is confronted by Azazel after the Rating Game between Issei and Sairaorg, where he revealed the fact that he had known Cao Cao and the whereabout of the True Longinus as well as his alliance with Hades for a long time, but opted to do nothing and has kept the fact hidden from everyone. In Volume 12, Indra sends the majority of the Hero Faction to the Realm of the Dead after taking all of their Longinus, claiming they have lost their value before retreating. In Volume 14, it is revealed that Indra is gathering forces to combat Shiva the God of Destruction, which is why he aligned himself with the Hero Faction and Hades.
- Shiva, the Hindu God of Destruction, who is said to be one of the few beings in existence that can match the Trihexa(666) in power. Azazel speaks to him in Volume 19.^{[LN 19]} He wishes to recruit Issei to battle against Indra.^{[LN 22]}

=== Chaos Brigade ===
The Chaos Brigade (禍の団(カオス・ブリゲード), Kaosu Burigēdo) was an organization led (as a Puppet King) by Ophis, the Dragon God, with the main purpose of removing Great Red, the most powerful Dragon in existence known as the True Dragon, out of the Dimensional Gap. It consists of a mix of beings from the fallen angels, humans, and angels.

==== Vali Team ====
The Vali Team (ヴァーリチーム, Vāri Chīmu) is a team of seven members of the Chaos Brigade. Their main goal is exploring, going on adventures, and finding strong opponents to battle. Ishibumi developed the team as a way to introduce some of his Norse mythology characters and that this team would have the most interaction with Issei among the Chaos Brigade's groups.^{[LN 4 afterword]} Eventually, the Vali Team join the DxD team against the remnants of the Chaos Brigade.^{[LN 16]}

Vali Lucifer (ヴァーリ・ルシファー, Vāri Rushifā)
Voiced by: Ryōta Ōsaka (Japanese); Austin Tindle (English)
Vali is the silver-haired descendant of Lucifer and possessor of the Vanishing Dragon Albion. He is introduced during the battle against Kokabiel, where he easily defeats him,^{[S2 ep 6]} and then challenges Issei to become stronger before they fight. Vali is the great-grandson of the former Maou and a human woman. During his childhood, he is abandoned by his parents who thought he was a monster and is eventually picked up by Azazel who raises and trains him. He later turns on Azazel during the peace conference between the three factions and joins the Chaos Brigade as the leader of the Vali Team.^{[LN 4]} Ishibumi developed Vali as a rival character, to contrast the ordinary high school student of Issei.^{[LN 4 afterword]}
Vali wants to defeat Great Red in order to become the strongest existence. A battle maniac, Vali can use the Juggernaut Mode by not consuming his lifespan, instead using his enormous demonic energy. However, he can only maintain his sanity for a few minutes; any longer will make him go berserk.
He is a powerful fighter who wields the Sacred Gear Divine Dividing (白龍皇の光翼(ディバイン・ディバイディング), Dibain Dibaidingu), which holds Albion's spirit. The Gear works in the opposite way of Issei's Boosted Gear, where upon contact, halves the opponent's power every ten seconds.^{[S2 ep 6]} Vali can also add the opponent's halved power to his own, which contributed to the defeat of the Fallen Angel Kokabiel during his introductory chapter. Like Issei, he also has a Balance Breaker armor called Divine Dividing Scale Mail (白龍皇の鎧(ディバイン・ディバイディング・スケイルメイル), Dibain Dibaidingu Sukeiru Meiru; lit. "Armor of the White Dragon Emperor"), which is similar to Issei's Scale Mail aside from it being white and having Dragon wings. The Divine Dividing also has the ability to halve the size of objects and living beings through the use of its "Half Dimension".
In Volume 12, Vali uses a new form called the Empireo Juggernaut Overdrive (白銀の極覇龍(エンピレオ・ジャガーノート・オーバードライブ), Enpireo Jagānōto Ōbādoraibu; lit. Silver Dragon Pole of Supremacy), which changes the color of his armor to silver. Like Issei's Cardinal Crimson Promotion, it does not consume his life. In this state, Vali can use an enhanced version of Half Dimension called "Compression Divider", which halves a specific target constantly until they vanish from existence.

Arthur Pendragon (アーサー・ペンドラゴン, Āsā Pendoragon)
Voiced by: Kaito Ishikawa (Japanese); J. Michael Tatum (English)
Arthur is a blond-haired swordsman who is the descendant of the Legendary King of Camelot, King Arthur. He is one of the two best swordsmen in the Chaos Brigade, earning the nickname "The Strongest Holy Sword User" (最強の聖剣使い, Saikyō no Seikentsukai). He is also a natural-born Holy Sword user like Xenovia. He wields one of the seven Excaliburs, "Excalibur Ruler" (支配の聖剣(エクスカリバー・ルーラー), Ekusukaribā Rūrā), the strongest Excalibur fragment, along with the Holy King Sword Collbrande (聖王剣コールブランド, SeiŌken Kōruburando), the Sword in the Stone and the most powerful Holy Sword in existence. Arthur uses the Excalibur Ruler to control Fenrir. In Volume 11, Le Fay gives the Excalibur Ruler to Irina after Arthur abandons the sword, as Fenrir no longer needs to be controlled by it. In Volume 12, after raiding the Realm of the Dead, killing many of Hades' Grim Reapers along with his team-mates, he battles Yuto Kiba, challenging him after deeming him to be a worthy opponent for his Holy King Sword, telling Yuto that he will fight him when Vali fights Issei.

Le Fay Pendragon (ルフェイ・ペンドラゴン, Rufei Pendoragon)
Voiced by: Minami Shinoda (Japanese); Natalie Hoover (English)
Le Fay is Arthur's sister who is the descendant of Morgan le Fay. She is a blonde-haired witch who summons Gogmagog in battle. She is a huge fan of Issei's show. In Volume 14, she moves to the Hyoudou Residence as a semi-permanent residence. In Volume 17 she successfully creates a summoning contract with Issei. In Volume 19 she enrolls at Kuoh Academy.

Bikou (美猴, Bikō)
Voiced by: Makoto Yasumura (Japanese); David Trosko (English)
Bikou is the descendant of Sun Wukong and the current Monkey King. He likes to mock Issei and Rias, coining the nicknames "Oppai Dragon" (おっぱいドラゴン, Oppai Doragon; lit. "Breast Dragon") for Issei and "Switch Princess" (スイッチ姫, Suitchi Hime) for Rias, which he would constantly use to address them (he even said he was proud of being the one to give two huge celebrities their nicknames). He is a Senjutsu user like Kuroka and Koneko, and like Vali, he is also a battle maniac. He also has his ancestor's legendary golden staff, the Nyoi-bo (如意棒, lit. "Mind Stick") and golden cloud, Kinto-un (筋斗雲, lit. "Somersault Cloud"). Bikou is extremely fearful of his ancestor, the original Sun Wukong and first Monkey King, saying that he is a total monster despite his age.

Kuroka (黒歌)
Voiced by: Minami Takahashi (Japanese); Lydia Mackay (Note: Credited as Sasha Jakes.) (English)
Kuroka is Koneko's older sister and the only major Vali Team member to not originate from a hero. She is a black-haired humanoid nekomata who wears a kimono. A former Evil Piece that consumed two bishops, she is a SS-class stray devil who Koneko resents. During her childhood, her master desires to test the limits of the nekomata's Senjutsu ability by using Koneko as a test subject, but Kuroka kills her master to protect her younger sister. Eventually, out of a desire to bear the child of a Heavenly Dragon, Kuroka joins Vali's team. Kuroka arrives to fetch Koneko and attacks Issei, but she does not get a single hit on him. Later, after Vali rejects her advances, Kuroka turns her eyes towards Issei. After reconciling with Koneko, she teaches Senjutsu and Youjutsu to her,^{[LN 11]} and moves into the Hyoudou Residence.^{[LN 14]}

Fenrir (フェンリル, Fenriru)
Originally Loki's pet and son, Fenrir is a giant wolf with powerful fangs and claws that can kill God, Maou, and even a Dragon. Having God-like speed, Fenrir is considered to be one of the most dangerous beasts in the world rivaling the Two Heavenly Dragons, and is nicknamed the God-Devouring Wolf (Note: 神喰狼, Kamijiki Ōkami). Fenrir defeats Issei and his friends. However, when Vali arrives, Fenrir is the one defeated when Arthur subjects him to his Excalibur Ruler. As of Volume 11, Fenrir no longer needs to be controlled using Excalibur Ruler, but its abilities are reduced. He has taken a liking to Le Fay, and is often seen with her.

Fenrir has two sons: Sköll (Note: スコル, Sukoru) and Hati Hróðvitnisson (ハティ, Hati).

Gogmagog (ゴグマゴグ, Gogumagog)
A group of golems that were used as weapons of mass destruction created by the ancient God but all the Gogmagogs were abandoned in the Dimensional Gap. After hearing Ophis mentioning about a moving Gogmagog, Vali went to search for it to pick it up. He then gives it to Le Fay Pendragon.

==== Old Maou Faction ====
The Old Maou Faction (旧魔王派, KyūmaŌ-ha; lit. "Old Satan Faction") is an organization of the Chaos Brigade consisting of descendants of the original Maous. They are the only group of Devils who resist using the Evil Pieces system, as they believe them to be a disgrace to Devils because they reincarnate Humans and other races into Devils. They are also against the Devils' current system, and seek to change it by overthrowing the current Maous. Vali Lucifer is part of the Old Maou Faction before his defection and organization of the Vali Team. The remaining three leaders are eventually defeated, with the remaining members killed by Ajuka Beelzebub.

Shalba Beelzebub (シャルバ・ベルゼブブ, Sharuba Beruzebubu)
Voiced by: Ken Narita (Japanese); Ian Sinclair (English)
Shalba is a handsome, long-haired devil who is the descendant of Beelzebub. He and the other descendants of the Maous (except Vali) believe that the current Devil system is mistaken and seeks to change it. After killing Diodora Astaroth for failing to kill Issei, Shalba has Asia Argento sent to the Dimensional Gap. Issei activates his Juggernaut Drive and mercilessly kills Shalba. Later, Shalba is revived and attacks the Underworld, kidnapping Ophis in the process. However, Issei begins another fight with Shalba and kills him, but not before Shalba places Samael's curse on Issei.

Cattleya Leviathan (カテレア・レヴィアタン, Katerea Reviatan)
Voiced by: Harumi Sakurai (Japanese); Martha Harms (English)
Katerea is a voluptuous, brown-haired devil who is the descendant of Leviathan. During the peace conference between the Devils, Fallen Angels and Angels, she launches an assault on Kuoh Academy. She attacks Sirzechs Lucifer and Serafall Leviathan, and is the first one killed when Azazel challenges Cattleya to a fight and impales her with a spear.^{[S2 sp 12]}^{[LN 4]} The character is named after Katejina Loos from Mobile Suit Victory Gundam and Lady Une from Mobile Suit Gundam Wing.

Creuserey Asmodeus (クルゼレイ・アスモデウス, Kuruzerei Asumodeusu)
Voiced by: Hiromichi Tezuka (Japanese); Cris George (English)
Creuserey is a handsome, black-haired devil and the descendant of Asmodeus. He fights against Sirzechs Lucifer during the Rating Game between Rias Gremory and Diodora Astaroth to avenge Cattleya Leviathan, but is killed by Sirzechs.

==== Hero Faction ====
The Hero Faction (英雄派, Eiyū-ha) is a faction of the Chaos Brigade led by Cao Cao, the descendant of the ambitious ruler of China during the Three Kingdoms era. The faction is allied with Hades, the God from the Realm of the Dead, and it is also the most dangerous faction of the Brigade due to its members being Sacred Gear, Holy/Demon Sword, and Longinus wielders. The Hero Faction was defeated in Volume 12 when Indra sends the majority of its main members, Cao Cao, Georg and Leonardo to the Realm of the Dead, taking all of their Longinus from them. Siegfried died in battle while Jeanne and Heracles are captured.

Cao Cao (曹操, Sōsō)

Voiced by: Kōsuke Toriumi (Japanese); Clifford Chapin (English)

Cao Cao is the descendant of Cao Cao from the Chinese novel Romance of the Three Kingdoms and the leader of the Hero Faction. Like his ancestor, he has the eyes to find people with good potential. Cao Cao is a very charismatic person, as he was able to convince many Sacred Gear users to join the Hero Faction. He also believes that it is the responsibility as a descendant of a hero to destroy beings like Devils, Fallen Angels and Dragons that are threats to humans.

He is a calculative and observant person, as he studies and research on his enemy before he battles them so he can read their movement and attacks. In Volume 9 he lost one of his eyes to Issei's attack, and later replaces the lost eye with Medusa's eye, granting him the ability to turn anything to stone. He is a technique-type who has polished his technique to utmost perfection. Because he is a human, he is physically weaker than Issei and Vali, yet in Volume 11 he singlehandedly takes down the Gremory and Vali groups while protecting Georg and Samael, which results in Vali calling him the "strongest human".

His Sacred Gear is the True Longinus (黄昏の聖槍(トゥルー・ロンギヌス), Turū Ronginusu; lit. "Holy Spear of the Setting Sun"), the ultimate Longinus and the same spear that St. Longinus used to kill Jesus Christ. His Balance Breaker, Polar Night Longinus Chakravartin (極夜なる天輪聖王の輝廻槍(ポーラーナイト・ロンギヌス・チャクラヴァルティン), Pōrā Naito Ronginusu Chakuravarudin; lit. "Polar Night Becomes Chakravartin's Bright Curved Spear"), is a sub-species that is much stronger than the actual Balance Breaker of the True Longinus, True Longinus Geta Demelung (真冥白夜の聖槍(トゥルー・ロンギヌス・ゲッターデメルング), Turū Ronginusu Getā Demerungu; lit. "Holy Spear of the Pure White Night"). His Balance Breaker creates seven bowl-sized orbs called the Seven Treasures (七宝, Shippō), each having a different ability. The True Longinus also has a forbidden form called the "Truth Edea" (覇輝(トゥルース・イデア), Turūsu Idea; lit. "Brightness of Supremacy"), which is similar to the Juggernaut Drive.

Originally from the Chaos Brigade, Cao Cao betrayed them when he stole Ophis, their leader's, power and sided with Hades, the God from the Realm of the Dead, in an attempt to destroy both the Devils and Fallen Angels. After losing to Issei in Volume 12, Cao Cao, Georg and Leonardo was sent to the Realm of the Dead after having their Longinus confiscated by Indra. In Volume 18 he's released by Indra and decides to help the DxD face the threat of the Qlippoth and the Evil Dragons, while he still wishes to have a rematch against Issei.

Georg (ゲオルク, Georugu)

Voiced by: Nogami Shou (Japanese); Robby Gemaehlich (English)

Georg is the descendant of Georg Faust, the person who made a pact with the legendary Devil Mephistopheles, and Cao Cao's right-hand man. He possesses the Longinus "Dimension Lost" (絶霧(ディメンジョン・ロスト), Dimenshon Rosuto; lit. "Fog of Extinction"), a barrier-type Longinus that is listed among the top four Longinus. Though it has no offensive abilities, once the mist reaches the scale of countries, it can transfer an entire country and its people into the Dimensional Gap to be destroyed. The Balance Breaker of Dimension Lost, "Dimension Create" (霧の中の理想郷(ディメンション・クリエイト), Dimenshon Kurieito; lit. "Utopia of Mist"), allows the user to use the mist to create a barrier and trap the user's opponents in a different dimension. Aside from the Dimension Lost, Georg is a magician capable of a diverse array of spells, ranging from Norse magic, demonic spells, Fallen Angel spells, black magic, white magic, fairy magic, and the Dragon Gate magic circle. He was sent into the Realm of the Dead along with Cao Cao and Leonardo by Indra in Volume 12.

Leonardo (レオナルド, Reonarudo)

Voiced by: Airi Ōtsu (Japanese); Dallas Reid (English)

A boy who wields the Longinus "Annihilation Maker" (魔獣創造(アナイアレイション・メーカー), Anaiareishon Mēkā; lit. "Creation of the Demonic Beast"), which is also listed among the top four strongest Longinus and it has the ability to create any monster its wielder can imagine; however he has yet to fully master it. In Volume 11, he gets kidnapped by Shalba and was brainwashed by the latter into creating 13 gigantic monsters through its sub-species Balance Breaker, "Bandersnatch and Jabberwocky" (破滅の覇獣鬼(バンダースナッチ・アンド・ジャバウォッキー), Bandāsunatchi ando Jabawokkī), to attack the Underworld. As with Kuroka of the Vali Team, he is the only major Hero Faction member to not originate from a hero. He was sent into the Realm of the Dead along with Cao Cao and Georg by Indra in Volume 12.

Siegfried (ジークフリート, Jīkufurīdo)

Voiced by: Jun Fukushima (Japanese); Justin Briner (English)

Siegfried is the descendant of Siegfried, the legendary Dragon-slaying hero in Nibelungenlied. He is one of the top two swordsmen of the Chaos Brigade alongside Arthur Pendragon of the Vali Team, and is nicknamed "The Demon Sword User" (魔剣使い, Makentsukai) and the "Demonic Emperor". In the past, Siegfried worked for the Orthodox Church and is considered the best swordsman after Dulio, bearing the nickname "Chaos-Edge Sieg" (魔剣(カオスエッジ)ジーク, Kaosu Ejji Jīku), but he eventually left the Church and joined the Hero Faction.

His Sacred Gear is "Twice Critical" (龍の手(トゥワイス・クリティカル), Tuwaisu Kuritikaru; lit. "Hand of the Dragon"), a common Sacred Gear and the Sacred Gear Raynare mistook Issei to have possessed. Since it is a sub-species, instead of a gauntlet, it creates a third Dragon Arm on Seigfried's back and doubles his power. Its Balance Breaker, "Chaos Edge Asura Ravage" (阿修羅と魔龍の宴(カオスエッジ・アスラ・レヴィッジ), Kaosu Ejji Asura Revijji; lit. "Feast of Asura and the Demonic Dragon"), allows him to have four Dragon Arms growing out from his back, with his power doubling for each. As a result, he has six Arms in total (including his real arms) in his Balance Breaker form. He has all five Demon Swords – Gram, Balmung, Nothung, Tyrfing, and Dáinsleif – and one Light Sword in his possession.

He fights Kiba and Xenovia by himself and defeats them with ease in Volume 9. In Volume 11, he has a rematch with Kiba, resulting with the latter cutting off one of his Dragon Arms. In Volume 12, he fought against Yuto for the third and final time, injecting the blood of the original Maou which transforms his body into a monstrous spider while fusing with his Demon Swords. He eventually lost to the latter after Gram left him and chooses Yuto as their new wielder, corroding into dust after his defeat.

Jeanne (ジャンヌ, Jan'nu)

Voiced by: Ayaka Asai (Japanese); Amber Lee Connors (English)

A beautiful blonde girl who carries the spirit of the Maiden of Orleans, Joan of Arc. She has a cheerful personality and likes to call people nicknames, such as calling Siegfried "Sieg-kun" and Irina "Angel-chan". She defeats Irina in Volume 9. In Volume 12, Jeanne challenged Irina (for the second time), Akeno and Xenovia, taking the children of the Underworld hostage after feeling at a disadvantage. The situation was reversed by the returning Issei who saved the children, forcing Jeanne to use the same doping used by Siegfried, fusing with her Sacred Gear which creates a Holy Sword Armor, but was still defeated by Issei who simply uses his Dress Break to destroy the armor and shoots a Dragon Shot. She is captured after her defeat.

Aside from carrying a rapier, Jeanne wields the Sacred Gear "Blade Blacksmith" (聖剣創造(ブレード・ブラックスミス), Burēdo Burakkusumisu; lit. "Creation of the Holy Sword"), which is the Holy Sword version of Kiba's "Sword Birth" that can create numerous Holy Sword of different attributes. Her Balance Breaker, "Stake Victim Dragon" (断罪の聖龍(ステイク・ビクティム・ドラグーン), Suteiku Bikutimu Doragūn; lit. "Holy Dragon of Judgement"), is a sub-species and it creates a Dragon made out of Holy Swords.

Heracles (ヘラクレス, Herakuresu)

Voiced by: Kasama Jun (Japanese); Christopher Guerrero (English)

A man who carries the spirit of the Greek mythological hero Heracles. He is a giant and a battle maniac. He defeats a drunk Rossweisse in Volume 9. In Volume 12, he faces against the Sitri Group where he won by taking the children of the Underworld hostage. He then faces Sairaorg in a one-on-one fight which he lost. He is captured after his defeat.

His Sacred Gear is called "Variant Detonation" (巨人の悪戯(バリアント・デトネイション), Barianto Detoneishon; lit. "Prank of the Giant"), which has the ability to explode the same time it attacks. Its Balance Breaker is called "Detonation Mighty Comet" (超人による悪意の波動(デトネイション・マイティ・コメット), Detoneishon Maiti Kometto; lit. "Malicious Wave of the Superman"), which shoots missile-like objects.

Connla (コンラ, Konra)

Voiced by: Kentarō Kumagai (Japanese); Orion Pitts (English)

He did not have an easy life, as a kid he was feared and oppressed by others due to his ability to control shadows, that is until Cao Cao came to him and persuaded the young man to join the Hero Faction.

He has a "Night Reflection" (闇夜の大盾(ナイト・リフレクション), Naito Rifurekushon): A Sacred Gear that grants him the ability to control shadows.

==== Qlippoth ====
Rizevim Livan Lucifer (リゼヴィム・リヴァン・ルシファー, Rizevimu Rivan Rushifā)
Rizevim is the silver-haired leader of Chaos Brigade and the third Super Devil. He is the son of the Original Lucifer and grandfather of Vali Lucifer. He always speaks in a childish way that carries no weight and filled with joke and ill intent. He is also known to be very vicious and brutal, even toying with his son, whom he deemed to be worthless, to persecute Vali and throw away Vali before killing his son. For most of his life he lacked any ambition or dream, but all changed once he met Euclid Lucifuge, and decided that he wanted to release the Trihexa(666) to destroy the Great Red and bring chaos to all the other worlds. He, along with Ajuka Beelzebub and Sirzechs Lucifer is one of the three Devils who are considered as Super Devils, with their abilities far exceeding even the Four Original Satans. He possesses a unique ability which can nullify all abilities of Sacred Gears and of Sacred Gear-enchanted powers just by touch. He manages to infiltrate and launch an assault on Heaven, only to be defeated by Issei and discover that Michael has the fruits of life and wisdom. Later, Rizevim kidnaps Issei's parents and forces Issei to transform in front of them, but Rizevim is overpowered by Issei, injured by Vali and killed by Fafnir.

Euclid Lucifuge (ユーグリット・ルキフグス, Yūguritto Rukifugusu)
Grayfia's younger brother who leads Grendel into attacking Kuoh Academy. Appears to have a disdain for his sister, but is only to hide his obsession towards her. He was able to create a replica of Boosted Gear by collecting information of the Sekiryuutei's soul and the Sacred Gear from Issei's original body left in the Dimensional Gap by using the Holy Grail. Unlike the original Boosted Gear, Euclid's Boosted Gear appears on the right hand with silver lining.
Euclid is able to use the Balance-Breaker of the Boosted Gear by sacrificing the souls of several famous Dragon's since they are unable to make a copy of Ddraig's soul. The armor looks like Issei's Scale Mail, albeit with slight variations.
In Volume 17 he attacks the Aurea academy alongside the Evil Dragons, and once their purpose is fulfilled, he tries to kidnap Rossweisse and confesses his desire of making her a replacement for Grayfia. Issei, furious at his insanity, unleashes his full power and soundly defeats him with his new technique, Longinus Smasher. He's captured and sent to his brother-in-law and sister to be questioned.

Lillith (リリス, Ririsu)
The spawn of Ophis created from her stolen powers in Volume 11 and is currently considered as Ophis by the Alliance and Chaos Brigade. Lilith looks exactly like Ophis except with a more devoid of emotion look. Rizevim Livan Lucifer named Lilith after his mother, Lilith, who was known as "The Beginning Mother of all Devils".

=== Dragons ===
Dragons (ドラゴン, Doragon) make up some of the most powerful beings in High School DxD. Most of the dragons are neutral and do not ally with the three factions.^{[S2 ep 8]} Besides Ophis there are the following dragons:

==== Ddraig ====
Voiced by: Fumihiko Tachiki (Japanese); Christopher R. Sabat (English)
Ddraig (ドライグ, Doraigu) is the Red Dragon residing in Issei's Boosted Gear.^{[S1 ep 12]}. Nicknamed the Welsh Dragon (赤い龍(ウェルシュ・ドラゴン), Werushu Doragon) and the Red Dragon Emperor (赤龍帝, Sekiryūtei), he has the power to destroy gods and devils. In the past, Ddraig battles dragon arch-rival Albion, but their struggle was interrupted by the great war among the three factions. In anger, both dragons attacked the leaders of three factions, which led to their bodies being destroyed and their souls moved to two separate Sacred Gears.^{[S2 ep 8]} Ddraig communicates telepathically with Issei on various occasions, giving him advice on his fights. He finds Issei's lecherous goals to be demeaning,^{[S1 ep 12]} and gets annoyed whenever Albion and others call him the "Breast Dragon Emperor", even crying^{[LN 7]} whenever he hears the word "breast".^{[LN 10]} In Volume 16 he and Albion resolve their differences and allow Issei to unlock the powers they once had, yelling they are no longer afraid of breasts and butts.^{[LN 16]}

==== Albion ====
Voiced by: Ryota Takeuchi (Japanese); Mark Fickert (English)
Albion (アルビオン, Arubion), known as the Vanishing Dragon (白い龍(バニシング・ドラゴン), Banishing Doragon), English Dragon, and the White Dragon Emperor (白龍皇, Hakuryūkō), is the white dragon residing within Vali Lucifer in the latter's Sacred Gear.^{[S2 ep 8]} Like Ddraig, Albion communicates telepathically with Vali.^{[S2 ep 6]}, and is annoyed to the point of crying that Issei is so obsessed with breasts.^{[LN 7]} This became even worse after Odin, who wanted to know Vali's interest in women, called them the "Butt Dragon Emperor" (ケツ龍皇, Ketsuryūkō). In Volume 16, he and Ddraig solve their differences and both yell they are no longer afraid of breasts and butts.^{[LN 16]}

==== Great Red ====
Great Red (グレートレッド, Gurēto Reddo), called the Apocalypse Dragon (真なる赤龍神帝(アポカリュプス・ドラゴン), Apkaryupusu Doragon), is one of the two Dragons that are above the Heavenly Dragons known as the "True Dragon" (真龍, Shinryū). The second largest Dragon after Midgardsormr, Called the "True Red Dragon God Emperor" (真なる赤龍神帝, Shin naru Sekiryūshintei), and "Dragon of Dragons" (D×D(ドラゴン・オブ・ドラゴン), Doragon obu Doragon; "DxD", for which the series is named after), Great Red lives in the Dimensional Gap and does not interfere in the world.
In Volume 12, Great Red helped Ophis and Issei by saving them from the crumbling dimension and restored Issei's body with his powers. He also lends Issei his power during his fight with the Jabberwocky created from Leonardo's Annihilation Maker, claiming that the "Beast" (referring to Jabberwocky) was glaring at him. After the battle, he returns to the Dimensional Gap while saying "Zoom Zoom Iyaaan" (from Oppai Dragon's theme song) over and over to Issei and Ddraig's dismay.
Great Red represents dreams, he also is called the "Dragon of Dreams" (DxD(ドラゴン・オブ・ドリーム), Doragon obu Dorīmu)

==== Other dragons ====
Vritra (ヴリトラ, Vuritora)
An evil Black Dragon known as the Prison Dragon (黒邪の龍王(プリズン・ドラゴン), Purizun Doragon).^{[S2 ep 9]} When Vritra was vanquished and sealed into Sacred Gears, its soul was divided into 4 parts: Absorption Line, Blaze Black Flare, Delete Field, and Shadow Prison. These four parts of Vritra's soul have different appearances and have been collected and sealed in Saji's body by Shemhazai, thus restoring Vritra's consciousness. Azazel hypothesized that due to contact with Issei, Vritra's consciousness appeared and might possibly unify all the different Sacred Gears because the other Sacred Gears melted together. Vritra possesses a wide range of special abilities. Though its power might be the lowest amongst the Dragon Kings, Vritra is the king of techniques in terms of variety and unconventionality. In volume 17 he helps Fafnir and Ddraig in convincing the former Divine Dividing users' souls into helping them. When he returned to help Saji reach the Balance Breaker, their minds became one. Similar to Ddraig he calls Saji "his other half".

Yu-Long (玉龍(ウーロン), Ūron)
A Green Asian Dragon and Dragon King known as the Mischievous Dragon (西海龍童(ミスチバス・ドラゴン), Misuchibasu Doragon) and West Sea Dragon Child (西海龍童, Saikai ryūdō) who went missing along with Sun Wukong prior to the series. He is the youngest among the Five Dragon Kings. He appeared with the original Sun Wukong in Volume 9 during the class trip to Kyoto, aiding Issei and the others against Cao Cao by fending off Yasaka.^{[LN 9]}

Fafnir (ファーブニル, Fābuniru)
A Golden Dragon known as the Gigantis Dragon (黄金龍君(ギガンティス・ドラゴン), Gigantisu Doragon) and the Golden Dragon Monarch (黄金龍君), Fafnir is one of the Five Dragon Kings that is sealed inside Azazel's artificial Sacred Gear, the Down Fall Dragon Spear. In Volume 14, he made a pact with Asia after being freed of his own contract with Azazel. Fafnir is revealed to be a perverted Dragon with a fetish for panties, sniffing them and referring to them as "treasures". According to Ddraig and Albion, Fafnir wasn't as perverted in the past as he is right now.
In Volume 17 when Asia summons him as part of experience at the Underworld school he mentions that he needs panties before working and while she agrees on the request, this only embarrasses Asia to the point of nearly fainting. He also helps Vritra and Ddraig to convince the former Divine Dividing users to help them, using the logic that panties are a symbol of peace, which only embarrasses Asia even more.^{[LN 17]}

Midgarðsormr (ミドガルズオルム, Midogaruzuorumu)
The Dragon of the End (終末の大龍, Shūmatsu no Dairyū) and Loki's second son. Known as the Sleeping Dragon (終末の大龍(スリーピング・ドラゴン), Surīpingu Doragon), Midgarðsormr is one of the Five Dragon Kings who is currently sleeping in the bottom of a Scandinavian sea and is the most powerful of the Five Kings. He was summoned by the Occult Research Club and Vali Team in Volume 7 to ask for advice on how to defeat Loki and Fenrir. He is the largest Dragon in the series, as well as the laziest. He calls his father, Loki, "Daddy" and his brother, Fenrir, "Doggy".^{[LN 7]}

Tiamat (ティアマット, Tiamatto)
A huge Blue Dragon and the only female among the Five Dragon Kings, known as the Chaos Karma Dragon. She's one of the few legendary Dragons that are still active and the strongest of the Dragon Kings. According to Ddraig, she hates him. Despite being mentioned many times, she first appears on Volume 19, where is revealed that she has worked closely with Ajuka Beelzebub in the creation of the Evil Pieces and is the Judge of the Rating Games.^{[LN 19]}

Crom Cruach (クロウ・クルワッハ, Kurō Kuruwahha)
A Dragon known as the Crescent Circle Dragon (三日月の暗黒龍(クレツセント・サークル・ドラゴン), Kuretsusento Sākuru Doragon; lit. "Dark Dragon of the Crescent Moon"). A mythical Dragon that was only named in one of the novel's short stories, it was said to be a Dragon that rule over death. He was also mentioned in volume 14 by Azazel when he was talking to Issei about evil dragons. According to legend, it was destroyed by the Christian religion while some say that it just went into a deep sleep.
It is said to be the strongest Evil Dragon. He is currently affiliated with the Chaos Brigade's Qlippoth along with the other Evil Dragons. Crom Cruach first appeared in Volume 16 where he was introduced by Marius Tepes as their bodyguard. After the years he spent on training himself back and forth between the Human world and Underworld, Crom Cruach has supposedly attained strength on par with the Heavenly Dragons. He has the ability to shapeshift from his dragon form to human form.

Grendel (グレンデル, Gurenderu)
An Evil Dragon known as the Crime Force Dragon (大罪の暴龍(クライム・フォース・ドラゴン), Kuraimu Fōsu Doragon; lit. "Berserker Dragon of Great Sin"). Grendel was the Evil Dragon that was slain by the original Beowulf. He was later revived by the Chaos Brigade. Grendel is a psycho Dragon that is only interested in fighting and killing. It is one of the main antagonists of Volume 14. The strength of his punch was said by Issei to be stronger than Sairaog's.
In Volume 16, he appears before the Occult Research Club while they were on the way to retrieve Valerie. After a fierce battle Grendel loses with only half of his head remaining due to taking on Rias' new finishing move, Extinguished Star. He is forced to retreat after Crom Cruach commandeers the fight.
In Volume 17 he attacks the Aurea academy alongside Aži Dahāka and Ladon, but refuses to retreat when called back and Issei and Sairaorg tag-team against him. When they stop his escape, they finally kill him, while Koneko seals his soul so he won't return anymore.
Aži Dahāka (アジ・ダハーカ, Aji Dahāka)
An Evil Dragon known as the Diabolism Thousand Dragon (魔源の禁龍(ディアボリズム・サウザンド・ドラゴン), Diaborizumu Sauzando Doragon). Aži Dahāka is a cruel and wicked Dragon with three heads and six wings. He is first mentioned on Volume 15 and it is implied that he may enjoy pain, as he keeps standing with wicked laughter while receiving damages from the Vali Team. It is said that Aži Dahāka has knowledge and control over one thousand magic. In Volume 17, alongside Euclid Lucifuge and Ladon he uses a spell to nullify the Magic of all the present magicians at the Aurea Academy.
Apophis (アポプス, Apopusu)
An Evil Dragon known as the Eclipse Dragon (原初なる晦冥龍(エクリプス・ドラゴン), Ekuripusu Doragon).
Ladon (ラードゥン, Rādun)
An Evil Dragon known as Insomniac Dragon that was killed by the original Heracles and has the appearance of a Tree Dragon. It first appears on Volume 17 alongside Grendel, Aži Dahāka and Euclid Lucifuge to create a barrier that isolates the Aurea Academay from the outside world. He helps Grendel fight Issei and traps him with his barriers, until he is called back and retreats. While his body isn't as strong as Grendel's, his magical barriers makes him incredibly hard to attack.
Yamata no Orochi (やまたのおろち)
An Evil Dragon known as Venom Blood Dragon, who wasn't given a new body upon its revival. Instead his soul was split in two, the first being sealed inside the holy sword Kusanagi and the other half was given to Walburga for her use.^{[LN 18]}
Tannin (タンニーン, Tan'nīn)
Voiced by: Tarō Yamaguchi (Japanese); Matt Thurston (English)
Known as the Blaze Meteor Dragon (魔龍聖(ブレイズ・ミーティア・ドラゴン), Bureizu Mītia Doragon) and the Devil Dragon Saint (魔龍聖, Maryūsei), he is the Purple Dragon and a former Dragon King that reincarnated and became an Ultimate-Class Devil. He trained Issei in the mountains in order to for him to attain his Balance Breaker. Tannin has a close relationship with Issei ever since he trained him, allowing him to call him "Old Man Tannin" (タンニーンのおっさん, Tan'nīn-ossan). He became a Devil to gain access to the Underworld in order to train young Dragons and preventing their race from going extinct, as the majority of them are either dead, missing, or sealed in Sacred Gears. It is later revealed in Volume 14 that he is Mephisto Pheles' Queen, making him the first male Queen piece.
Samael (サマエル, Samaeru; סמאל)
Known as the Dragon Eater (龍喰者(ドラゴン・イーター), Doragon Ītā), a beast with an upper body of an Angel and a lower body of an Asian Dragon. It is the natural enemy of all Dragons, having the ability to destroy other Dragons through a powerful curse like poison which are extremely deadly to a Dragon or a Dragon possessor. It is said that long ago, Samael was the perpetrator that influenced the first man, Adam and Eve, to eat the Fruit of Wisdom, and was cursed by God to become a Dragon because of God's hatred on Dragons. Following the curse, it was sealed in the deepest part of the Underworld, Cocytus. Hades summoned it from the Underworld and gave it to Cao Cao temporarily as part of the alliance. During the battle between Cao Cao and the Gremory and Vali teams, Samael's poison was injected into Vali's body, while Issei received the poison through an arrow fused with Samael's blood during his fight with Shalba.

=== Yōkai ===
Yōkai (妖怪) are group of supernatural monsters from Japanese folklore. There are many species of yōkai. Kunou and Yasaka are Nine-tailed Foxes (九尾の狐, Kyūbi no Gitsune), while Koneko and Kuroka are Nekomata (猫又; lit. "Forked Cats"), a sub-species of Bakeneko (化け猫; lit. "Monster Cats"). Other types of yōkai include Yuki-onna, Kappa, Karasu-Tengu, and Nue. The ones shown so far are led by Yasaka in Kyoto. For Devils to visit, permission has to be requested ahead and special "tickets" given, allowing access to the various shrines and temples without feeling fear from Holy elements or receiving damage from traversing Holy Ground.

Sun Wukong (孫悟空, Son Gokū)

Voiced by: Mugihito (Japanese); Charles C. Campbell (English)

Bikou's ancestor, he is the first Monkey King who is known as "The Great Victorious Fighting Buddha" (闘戦勝仏()()(), Tōsen Shōbutsu). He appeared alongside Yu-Long in Kyoto, helping Issei and his friends during their fight against Cao Cao. He is extremely powerful, as he was able to overpower several members of the Hero Faction within seconds, a considerable feat as they were all Sacred Gear and Holy Sword users. He was even able to block Cao Cao's True Longinus with a single finger, which was even complimented by Azazel as the True Longinus is a spear capable of killing God.

Sun Wukong carries a staff that extend and retract in size and length in battle. He is a master of Senjutsu and Youjutsu as well, being capable of rejuvanating Issei with a single touch of his staff. He is currently looking for Bikou, which the latter speculates that it is because he joined a terrorist organization (Chaos Brigade). In Volume 16 he becomes the Sub-Leader of the newly formed DxD Team. He decides to train the Longinus users of the DxD so they are capable of facing God-level opponents.

Kunou (九重, Kunō)

Voiced by: Sora Tokui (Japanese); Sarah Wiedenheft (English)

The young ruler of Kyoto. A nine-tailed fox yōkai. She has a crush on Issei. In Volume 19 she transfers to the Elementary section of the Kuoh Academy.

Yasaka (八坂)

Voiced by: Yo Taichi (Japanese); Janelle Lutz (English)

Kunou's mother. Like her daughter, she is also a nine-tailed fox and an extremely powerful yōkai that is on par with an Ultimate-Class Devil. She was captured by Cao Cao under the intention of opening the Dragon Gate to test the effect the Dragon Eater Samael can have on Great Red. She is eventually rescued by Issei and his friends who are on their trip in Kyoto. In Volume 12, Yasaka led her fellow yōkai to assist the Underworld in their crisis, easily disposing of one of the Bandersnatch.

=== Vampires ===
Vampires (吸血鬼, Kyūketsuki) are a race of supernatural creatures even more proud and aloof than Devils. While some Devils, particularly the Gremory clan, treat their slaves/servants like family or allow advancement in rank, while for a Vampire to be treated as high-class, they have to be born into a high-class Vampire family. Transformed vampires are despised and eternally low-class and none of the clans are considered to even be close to treating their slaves even remotely as family. Gasper is despised for being half-human, his out-of-control Sacred Gear, and apparently the "Darkness" Vampire powers he used to defeat Georg. Like the stories tell, Vampires are weak against sunlight, garlic and holy items. Although Gasper's clan, the Vladi, have a clan trait of being Daywalkers, meaning sunlight won't kill or hurt them any more than it does Devils. Vampires are mostly cut off from other groups by preference, and word is that fighting between clans broke out shortly after one clan got hold of a Longinus user.

Elmenhilde Karnstein (エルメンヒルデ・カルンスタイン, Erumenhirude Karunsutain)
Nicknamed Elmen (エルメン, Erumen), she is a member of the Carmilla Faction (カーミラ派, Kamīra-ha), an all-female Vampire faction. She appears in Volume 14 as a special Envoy of the Carmilla Faction wanting Gasper to join their side.
She reappears in Volume 16 as the escort for the Occult Research Club in the Carmilla Territory. She later appears again with Bennia's help to inform the Occult Research Club that the Vampires from the Carmilla Faction will start their action to suppress the coup d'etat group of the Tepes Faction. She is last seen after the chaos left behind by Rizevim and his group using the mass-produced Evil Dragons transformed from the modified Vampires in both the Tepes and Carmilla Factions, where she is noticeably distraught about the damage to her homeland.

Valerie Tepes (ヴァレリー・ツェペシュ, Varerī Tsepeshu)
A Vampire belonging to the Tepes Faction (ツェペシュ派, Tepeshu-ha), an all-male Vampire faction. Like Gasper, she is a Dhampir and the two had been childhood friends. She was the one that helped Gasper escape from the Vampire world. After helping Gasper escape, she awakened her Longinus and indirectly helped her clan to enhance its power. She wields the Longinus "Sephiroth's Grail" (幽世の聖杯(セフイロト・グラール), Sefuiroto Gurāru; lit. "Holy Chalice of the Secluded World"), one of the four Holy Relics alongside the True Longinus.
Valerie's Longinus is a sub-species where she has a total of 3 Holy Grails. The Sephiroth Graal has the ability to make contact with the principle of life, where Valerie has been forcefully told about how the life and soul is made. Due to the nature of the Sephiroth Graal, Valerie also takes in the mind and the concept of the dead, the living, and various other things as she uses the Holy Grail which resulted in her current broken state by the abundance of thoughts that enters her heart and soul when overusing the Sephiroth Graal. A side effect of the corrosion on Valerie caused by overusing the Sephiroth Graal is she can talk with the dead from the other world. In spite of this, she can still show some emotions like happiness. She had two out of her three Holy Grails extracted from her by Rizevim Livan Lucifer and Marius Tepes, but the grail stolen by Marius was later returned to her. Unfortunately, the stress of having her second grail removed was too much for her body and was put in a comatose state. After the chaos done by Qlippoith, she was seen being carried by Gasper from the basement and was taken to Grigori's research institute.

Marius Tepes (マリウス・ツェペシュ, Mariusu Tsepeshu)
A pure-blooded vampire and a member of the Tepes Faction, a Male-dominated Vampire faction. He is also Valerie Tepes half-brother.
Marius appears in Volume 16, introducing himself to the Occult Research Club as the new Mayor of the Tepes Faction after overthrowing his father in a coup d'etat. He later plotted to extract Valerie's Longinus from her body, finalizing the extraction ceremony in front of the Occult Research Club. After obtaining the Holy Grail, Marius becomes arrogant believing that he has attained an even greater height, resurrecting even after an attack by Rias which destroyed the upper half of his body. His arrogance, however, proved to be his undoing as it angered Gasper into using his "true form" and was completely devoured by the darkness released by Gasper much to his horror as the Holy Grail proves useless against Gasper's power.

Lord Vladi
Gasper Vladi's father and the current head of the House of Vladi. Unlike most Vampires, Lord Vladi doesn't seem to despise or discriminate other species, though he is shown to have no problem discriminating his own son. Despite so, he was shown to be somewhat glad that Gasper has found a place that accepts him.

== Other characters ==
=== Matsuda ===
Matsuda (松田)
Voiced by: Yasuaki Takumi (Japanese); Tyson Rinehart (English)
One of Issei's best friends that make up the Perverted Trio (変態三人組, Hentai San'nin-gumi). Matsuda has a shaved head, and is a self-proclaimed lolicon.^{[LN 1]} He is jealous of Issei's relationship with the girls of the Occult Research Club.^{[S1 ep 1]} and spreads some rumors about Issei.^{[S2 ep 1]}

=== Motohama ===
Motohama (元浜)
Voiced by: Takuro Nakakuni (Japanese); Ruben Tadeo Garcia (English)
Issei's other friend in the Perverted Trio, he wears glasses, and claims that they are able to determine a girl's body measurements just by staring.^{[LN 1]} He too is jealous of Issei's relationship with the girls of the Occult Research Club, and also spreads bad rumors about him.^{[S2 ep 1]}

=== Murayama and Katase ===
Murayama (村山) and Katase (片瀬)
Murayama:Voiced by: Kaori Ishihara (Japanese); Haley Esposito (English)
Katase:Voiced by: Yui Ogura (Japanese); Mary Morgan (English)
Murayama and Katase are a pair of students who are always seen together, as they are members of the Girl's Kendo Club of Kuoh Academy. Like most of the girls in the school, they admire both Rias Gremory and Akeno Himejima and have romantic affections towards Yuto Kiba.^{[LN 1]} They also despise Issei Hyoudou due to his perverted behavior and often beat him up as retaliation for all the lecherous acts he subjects on them, such as using his Dress Break technique to strip Murayama and Katase of their clothes in front of the entire school.^{[S1 Omake–4]}

=== Freed Sellzen ===
Freed Sellzen (フリード・セルゼン, Furīdo Seruzen)
Voiced by: Yoshitsugu Matsuoka (Japanese); Ben Phillips (English)
Freed is a recurring antagonist in the series; he is a human priest who kills devils and the humans who make contracts with them, claiming they are already stained beyond salvation. Although he has worked for the Vatican, he does not believe in God from the start, and desires to kill monsters, which makes him a wanted criminal as well as an enemy to the devils. He wields a sword of light and a pistol that fires devil-purging rounds. As a "stray exorcist", he employs Asia Argento to set up a barrier at his home.^{[S1 ep 3]} but is later revealed to be in cahoots with fallen angel Raynare.^{[S1 ep 4]} He is sought after by Xenovia and Irina for killing a priest,^{[S2 ep 3]} and stealing the Holy Swords such as Excalibur Mimic. He sides with fallen angel Kokabiel of the Grigoris,^{[S2 ep 4]} where he has merged four of the seven Excaliburs. He is defeated by Yuto with a slice to his torso, but returns in Volume 6 as part of the Chaos Brigade where his body is attached to a chimera, only to be finally killed by Yuto.^{[LN 6]}

=== Mil-tan ===
Mil-tan (ミルたん, Miru-tan)
Voiced by: Kenta Miyake (Japanese); Chris Rager (English)
A muscular guy who wishes to become a magical girl, he is referenced in the early light novel volumes. He ends his sentences with "Nyo" (にょ).^{[S1 ep 6]} In one of the anime episodes, Issei sets Matsuda and Motohama up on a date with Mil-tan and a friend.^{[S1 ep 8]}

=== Aika Kiryuu ===
Aika Kiryuu (桐生 藍華, Kiryū Aika)
Voiced by: Haruka Yamazaki (Japanese); Kara Edwards (Note: Credited as Alexia Sabanbeard.) (English)
A bespectacled student with braids, she is Asia's friend who regularly appears in the second season of the anime adaptation.^{[S2 ep 3]} She likes to tease Asia about her crush on Issei,^{[S2 ep 1]} and one of her hobbies is giving Asia romance advice like welcoming Issei home in a naked apron,^{[S2 ep 4]} or made-up traditions like bloomers are the ideal Japanese sportswear for dodgeball. She later reveals an ability to calculate a male's "manhood" size just by looking. She eventually finds out the truth about devils.^{[LN 19]}

=== Valper Galilei ===
Valper Galilei (バルパー・ガリレイ, Barupā Garirei)
Voiced by: Eizo Tsuda (Japanese); Kenny Green (English)
Known as the Archbishop of Annihilation, is a human excommunicated member of the Church who was responsible for the Holy Sword Project.^{[S2 ep 3]} He reveals that he was able to isolate the genes responsible for wielding the Holy Swords, and transfer it to other subjects so that they can wield Holy Swords. He has the participating children terminated, and harvests their souls into a crystal that he later gives to Yuto Kiba. He is mercilessly killed by Kokabiel.^{[S2 ep 5]}

=== Tobio Ikuse ===
Tobio Ikuse/Slash Dog (幾瀬 鳶雄／刃狗(スラッシュドッグ), Ikuse Tobio/Surasshu Doggu)
Tobio Ikuse (better known by his alias, Slash Dog) is a human who possesses the Longinus Canis Lycaon (Note: 黒刃の狗神(ケイネス・リュカオン), Keinesu Ryukaon) and works for the Fallen Angels. According to Azazel, he does not get along with Vali. He is Akeno Himejima's cousin. His name comes from one of Ishibumi's previous works, SLASH/DØG.

=== Kiyome Abe ===
Kiyome Abe (安倍 清芽, Abe Kiyome)
The Captain of Kuoh Academy's Tennis Club who comes from a human family of beast tamers. Initially she is very wary of the Occult Research Club since, as a human, she believed all the rumors of Devils being pure evil, contracts held to the letter with the spirit ground up, and thought they were after her soul. Since she needed to borrow Issei for an unnamed reason, and the Occult Research Club needed a report on monsters ASAP (Rias has to do the report to earn credits at Demon School, if she's ever short she'll have to return to the Underworld, with her servants, and attend Demon School in person.) As Rias did not want to loan Issei and Abe was wary of them, it was decided to have a tennis match where the winner got what they wanted for free, no strings attached. For the match, Abe used a Harpy (lost) and a Lamia (won) for the two singles games and played doubles with Christie against Rias and Issei for the tie-breaker. Christie's freezing breath was hampering Issei's meager skills so he put on Honda (who was as upset as Issei that Yuki-onna weren't beautiful maidens, but yetis) which help Rias and him win. Later on, she asks Rias if she can borrow Issei to cancel an arranged marriage her father was pushing for. Rias having escaped an arranged marriage herself agrees, but only if the whole group can come in exchange for some information Kiyome knows about various monsters and mythical beasts. After succeeding, in some rather strange ways, Kiyome is attracted to Issei because of how cool he looked during the duel. Although whether anything will come of this is unknown at this point.
Kiyome's club members that are monsters include: Christie (Note: クリスティ, Kurisuti), a yuki-onna who resembles a yeti in her monster form, who develops a crush on Issei after the latter wears Honda's armor; "No-Head" Honda (Note: ノーヘッド本田, Nōheddo Honda), a dullahan (animated armor), who gives immense strength to its wearer; and Estleena (Note: エステリーナ, Esuterīna), a mermaid that has a Tuna fish head and human legs, much to Issei's dismay.

=== Shuri Himejima ===
Shuri Himejima (姫島 朱璃, Himejima Shuri)
Voiced by: Shizuka Ito (Japanese); Stephanie Young (Note: Credited as Melanie Mitchel.) (English)
Akeno's mother and Baraqiel's wife. A priestess coming from a well-known shrine, Shuri rescues him when he was injured, and falls in love with him, but her family believes she was being brainwashed. In the rescue attempt, she defends Akeno while Baraqiel is away at the cost of her own life, which leads to Akeno resenting Baraqiel. It is revealed in one of the side stories that Shuri enjoys sadist activities with her husband.{{}}

=== Belzard ===
Belzard (ベルザード, Beruzādo)

Voiced by: Yutaka Aoyama (Japanese); David Matranga (English)

One of the former wielders of the Boosted Gear and is known as the strongest possessor, defeating two White Dragon Emperors in his lifetime.^{[LN 9]}

=== Elsha ===
Elsha (エルシャ, Erusha)

Voiced by: Rie Tanaka (Japanese); Elizabeth Maxwell (English)

Another former wielder of the Boosted Gear and is known as the strongest female possessor. She appears in Volume 9 alongside Belzard inside the Boosted Gear, providing Issei the "box" to tap into the full power of the Red Dragon Emperor.^{[LN 9]}

=== Göndul ===
Göndul (ゲンドゥル, Gendouru)
Rossweisse's grandmother. A former Valkyrie and a very famous magic user, she's contacted by Sona to be an expositor at the inauguration of her school. She's not shy about asking her granddaughter the status of her relationship with Issei. Just like Rossweisse she tends to speak in her native country accent whenever frustrated. She is among the few persons that investigated the existence of the Trihexa.

=== Walburga ===
Walburga (ヴァルブルガ, Vuaruburuga)
A Magician and one of the leaders of the Hexennacht, a group of stray magicians. She's the wielder of one of the Longinus, Incinerate Anthem (紫炎祭主による磔台(インシネレート・アンセム), Inshinerēto Ansemu), the Holy Cross. Its special ability is to create purple holy flames in the form of a cross that can incinerate Devils with ease. Walburga is a sadist who loves looking at people in pain. She has also allied with Rizevim Livan Lucifer after the latter's reemergence.^{[LN 17]}

=== Touji Shido ===
Touji Shido (紫藤 トウジ, Shidō Tōji)
Irina's father and a priest for the Orthodox Church in England. He first appears on Volume 18 to visit his daughter for Christmas, and to deliver a special room created by Heaven that would allow an angel and a devil to have a child, so that Issei and Irina can give him grandchildren.^{[LN 18]}

=== Masaomi Yaegakii ===
Masaomi Yaegakii (八重垣 正臣, Yaegakii Masaomi)
The resurrected "Avenger" and wielder of Kusanagi, which is imbedded with the soul of Yamata no Orochi. He is at first affiliated with the Church but he is killed after falling in love with Cleria Belial, the previous Devil that governed Kuoh. He is revived by Rizevim Livan Lucifer with the Holy Grail, and begins killing his former comrades responsible for his death, targeting Irina Shido's father Touji. After losing in the battle in Heaven, Masaomi is freed from the corruption of the Evil Dragon and stopped fighting. After almost coming to terms with Issei, someone who can understand him, Masaomi is killed by Rizevim who laughs at his demise, to Issei's anger.^{[LN 18]}

Vasco Strada (ヴァスコ・ストラーダ, Vasuko Sutorāda)
A 2 metres (6.6 ft) tall, 87-year-old man who is ranked as the third highest official in the Church as Cardinal Priest. A former wielder of Durandal who is considered closest to the original wielder Roland. Vasco is a gentle and compassionate man who holds no hatred towards Devils and Fallen Angels. He wields a Durandal replica given by the Pope himself, and while it only has a fifth of the power of the original, he can bring out its full potential. He first appears on Volume 19, challenging the Gremory Team, easily defeating nearly everyone, until he's defeated by the combined power of Arthur Pendragon and Xenovia Quarta.^{[LN 19]}

666 (Trihexa) (666(トライヘキサ), Toraihekisa)
Trihexa, also known as the Apocalyptic Beast (Note: 黙示録の皇獣(アポカリプティック・ビースト), Apokariputikku Bīsuto) is a powerful being that is sealed by God prior to the Great War among the three factions. It is revealed that the sealing exhausted God's power and resulted in his death at the hands of the devils and fallen angels in the Great War. Trihexa's power is comparable to Great Red's.^{[LN 16]} Trihexa is released from his imprisonment at the end of Volume 20. Trihexa is a gigantic Chimeric beast, even larger than the Great Red. ^{[LN 20]}

== Reception ==
Theron Martin of Anime News Network praised the character development, in which Rias "gradually starts to be attracted to Issei for his unqualified admiration and devotion," and calls Asia Argento "a fairly typical helpless, innocent, kind-hearted moe type, one who becomes interesting in part because her transition from being a nun to being a devil is fraught with problems." He also said that Issei's "interactions with his perverted best friends [Matsuda and Motohama] are also occasionally good for laughs, as are his own reactions to situations and his amusing alarm clock." Martin praised the English voice acting of Scott Freeman, Chloe Daniels and Felicia Angelle, but said that Teri Rogers made "Akeno sound cheerfully friendly without ever really infusing in the suggestive and sadistic undertones" and said that Jamie Marchi "often does not sound quite right as Rias even though she performs the role well."

Davey C. Jones of ActiveAnime said that the characters "have a good range of different types, no one looks the same, and each has an individual personality and powers." A reviewer for T.H.E.M. Anime Reviews said that "[TNK's] animation is generally doing those characters all kinds of favors" and although the reviewer said that the English voice actors are "a bit of an uneven bunch," the dialogue "keeps itself on a relatively informal level, with gratuitous usage of generally inoffensive sexual slang on the parts of Issei and his two friends." Sheena McNeil of Sequential Tart not only liked the diversity of the characters, but also liked the designs and personalities in them. McNeil also praised the Japanese and English voice acting in the series as well.

== See also ==
- Ichiei Ishibumi
- High School DxD episodes
- High School DxD light novels

== Notes ==
Japanese translations

Footnotes

== Works cited ==
=== High School DxD anime ===
==== Season 1 ====
- EP 1: "I Got a Girlfriend!"
- EP 2: "I'm Done Being Human"
- EP 3: "I Made a Friend!"
- EP 4: "I'm Saving My Friend!"
- EP 5: "I Will Defeat My Ex-girlfriend!"
- EP 6: "I Work as a Devil!"
- EP 7: "I Get a Familiar!"
- EP 8: "I Pick a Fight!"
- EP 9: "I've Begun My Training!"
- EP 10: "The Showdown Begins!"
- EP 11: "The Acclaimed Battle Continues!"
- EP 12: "I'm Here To Keep My Promise!"
- Omake–1: "Going Sunbathing"
- Omake–2: "Akeno's Personal Training"
- Omake–3: "Koneko Goes a Little Over the Top...Meow"
- Omake–4: "The Untold Story of the Dress Break's Birth?"
- Omake–5: "Making Udon"
- Omake–6: "Asia Transforms"
- OVA1: "I'm Harvesting Breasts!"
- OVA2: "I'm Searching For Breasts!"

==== Season 2: New ====
- EP 1: "Another Disquieting Premonition!"
- EP 2: "The Holy Sword Is Here!"
- EP 3: "I'll Destroy the Holy Sword!"
- EP 4: "A Strong Enemy Appeared"
- EP 5: "Decisive Battle at Kuoh Academy!"
- EP 6: "Go! Occult Research Club!"
- EP 7: "Summer! Bathing Suits! I'm In Trouble!"
- EP 8: "Open House Begins!"
- EP 9: "I Have a Junior!"
- EP 10: "Various Three-way Deadlocks!"
- EP 11: "The Leaders' Summit Begins!"
- EP 12: "Clash of the Twin Sky Dragons!"
- OVA3: "I'm Enveloped in Breasts!"

=== Light novels ===
- Vol. 1: Ishibumi, Ichiei (September 2008). High School DxD 1: Diabolos of the Old School Building (ハイスクールD×D1 旧校舎のディアボロス, Haisukūru Dī Dī 1: Kyūkōsha no Diaborosu) (in Japanese). "illustrated by" Zero Miyama. Kadokawa Shoten. ISBN 978-4-8291-3326-2.
- Vol. 2: Ishibumi, Ichiei (December 2008). High School DxD 2: Phoenix of the Battle School (ハイスクールD×D2 戦闘校舎のフェニックス, Haisukūru Dī Dī 2: Sentō Kōsha no Fenikkusu) (in Japanese). "illustrated by" Zero Miyama. Kadokawa Shoten. ISBN 978-4-8291-3358-3.
- Vol. 3: Ishibumi, Ichiei (April 2009). High School DxD 3: Excalibur of the Moonlit Schoolyard (ハイスクールD×D3 月光校庭のエクスカリバー, Haisukūru Dī Dī 3: Gekkō Kōtei no Ekusukaribā) (in Japanese). "illustrated by" Zero Miyama. Kadokawa Shoten. ISBN 978-4-8291-3391-0.
- Vol. 4: Ishibumi, Ichiei (September 2009). High School DxD 4: Vampire of the Suspended Classroom (ハイスクールD×D4 停止教室のヴァンパイア) (in Japanese). "illustrated by" Zero Miyama. Kadokawa Shoten. ISBN 978-4-8291-3427-6.
- Vol. 5: Ishibumi, Ichiei (December 2009). High School DxD 5: Hellcat of the Underworld Training Camp (ハイスクールD×D5 冥界合宿のヘルキャット, Haisukūru Dī Dī 5: Mekai Gasshuku no Herukyatto) (in Japanese). "illustrated by" Zero Miyama. Kadokawa Shoten. ISBN 978-4-8291-3470-2.
- Vol. 6: Ishibumi, Ichiei (March 2010). High School DxD 6: Holy Behind the Gymnasium (ハイスクールD×D6 体育館裏のホーリー) (in Japanese). "illustrated by" Zero Miyama. Kadokawa Shoten. ISBN 978-4-8291-3500-6.
- Vol. 7: Ishibumi, Ichiei (July 2010). High School DxD 7: Ragnarok After School (ハイスクールD×D7 放課後のラグナロク, Haisukūru Dī Dī 7: Hōkago no Ragunaroku) (in Japanese). "illustrated by" Zero Miyama. Kadokawa Shoten. ISBN 978-4-8291-3540-2.
- Vol. 8: Ishibumi, Ichiei (December 2010). High School DxD 8: The Work of a Devil (ハイスクールD×D8 アクマのおしごと, Haisukūru Dī Dī 8: Akuma no Oshigoto) (in Japanese). "illustrated by" Zero Miyama. Kadokawa Shoten. ISBN 978-4-8291-3593-8.
- Vol. 9: Ishibumi, Ichiei (April 2011). High School DxD 9: Pandemonium at the School Trip (ハイスクールD×D9 修学旅行はパンデモニウム, Haisukūru Dī Dī 9: Shūgakuryokō wa Pandemoniumu) (in Japanese). "illustrated by" Zero Miyama. Kadokawa Shoten. ISBN 978-4-8291-3628-7.
- Vol. 10: Ishibumi, Ichiei (September 2011). High School DxD 10: Lion Heart of the School Festival (ハイスクールD×D 10 学園祭のライオンハート, Haisukūru Dī Dī 10: Gakuen Matsuri no Raionhāto) (in Japanese). "illustrated by" Zero Miyama. Kadokawa Shoten. ISBN 978-4-8291-3677-5.
- Vol. 11: Ishibumi, Ichiei (January 2012). High School DxD 11: Ouroboros and Promotion Tests (ハイスクールD×D 11 進級試験とウロボロス, Haisukūru Dī Dī 11: Shunkyō Shiken to Uroborosu) (in Japanese). "illustrated by" Zero Miyama. Kadokawa Shoten. ISBN 978-4-8291-3720-8.
- Vol. 12: Ishibumi, Ichiei (April 2012). High School DxD 12: Heroes of Tutoring (ハイスクールD×D 12 補習授業のヒーローズ, Haisukūru Dī Dī 12: Hoshūjukyō no Hīrōzu) (in Japanese). "illustrated by" Zero Miyama. Kadokawa Shoten. ISBN 978-4-8291-3749-9.
- Vol. 13: Ishibumi, Ichiei (September 2012). High School DxD 13: Issei SOS (ハイスクールD×D 13 イッセーＳＯＳ, Haisukūru Dī Dī 13: Issē Esu Ō Esu) (in Japanese). "illustrated by" Zero Miyama. Kadokawa Shoten. ISBN 978-4-8291-3798-7.
- Vol. 14: Ishibumi, Ichiei (January 2013). High School DxD 14: Wizards of Career Counseling (ハイスクールD×D14 進路指導のウィザード, Haisukūru Dī Dī 14: Shinro-shidō no Wizādo) (in Japanese). "illustrated by" Zero Miyama. Kadokawa Shoten. ISBN 978-4-8291-3845-8.
- Vol. 15: Ishibumi, Ichiei (May 2013). High School DxD 15: The Dark Knight of Sunshine (ハイスクールD×D 15: 陽だまりのダークナイト, Haisukūru Dī Dī 15: Hidamari no Dākunaito) (in Japanese). "illustrated by" Zero Miyama. Kadokawa Shoten. ISBN 978-4-8291-9768-4.
- Vol. 16: Ishibumi, Ichiei (October 2013). High School DxD 16: Daywalker of the Extracurricular Lesson (ハイスクールD×D 16 課外授業のデイウォーカー, Haisukūru Dī Dī 16: Kagai Jugyō no Deiwōkā) (in Japanese). "illustrated by" Zero Miyama. Kadokawa Shoten. ISBN 978-4-04-712912-2.
- Vol. 17: Ishibumi, Ichiei (February 2014). High School DxD 17: Valkyrie of the Teacher Training (ハイスクールD×D 17 教員研修のヴァルキリー, Haisukūru Dī Dī 17: Kyōin Kenshū no Vuarukirī) (in Japanese). "illustrated by" Zero Miyama. Kadokawa Shoten. ISBN 978-4-04-070031-1.

=== Manga ===
- Vol. 1 (ch. 1–4): ハイスクールD×D 1 (in Japanese). Kadokawa Shoten. June 2011. ISBN 978-4-04-712733-3.
