= 真大 =

真大 or 眞大, meaning "true, great", may refer to:

- Mao, Japanese given name
  - Mao Hosoya (細谷 真大, born 2001), a Japanese footballer
- Masahiro, Japanese masculine given name
- Shinta, Japanese masculine given name
  - Shinta Appelkamp (アペルカンプ 真大, born 2000), a German footballer
- Zhenda, an abbreviated name of Aletheia University in Taiwan

== See also ==
- The dictionary definition of 真 at Wiktionary
- The dictionary definition of 眞 at Wiktionary
- The dictionary definition of 大 at Wiktionary
- Mao (disambiguation)
- Zhenda, a village in Bulgaria
