= Kadokawa Light Novel Expo =

Anime convention

- Status: Active
- Venue: Tokorozawa Sakura Town; Online (2021 event)
- Location: Saitama
- Country: Japan
- Inaugurated: March 6, 2021; 5 years ago
- Organiser: Kadokawa, Kimirano
- Website: lnexpo.kimirano.jp

Kadokawa Light Novel Expo (Japanese: KADOKAWAライトノベルEXPO, Hepburn: KADOKAWA raitonoberu ekisupo) or Ranosupo (らのすぽ, Ranosupo) is an annual Light Novel convention held in the Tokorozawa Sakura Town. The event hosted five Kadokawa's light novel Imprints, such as Dengeki Bunko, Fujimi Fantasia Bunko, Kadokawa Sneaker Bunko, MF Bunko J, and Famitsu Bunko.

== Event history ==
Year	Date	Venues	Attendance
2020	March 6 - April 11, 2021	Online (Main Event); Tokorozawa Sakura Town (Sub-Event); Saitama, Japan	3,032,009 (Streaming only)
2024	November 29 - December 16	Shibuya Tsutaya; Tokyo, Japan	
2025	December 19 - December 28	Shibuya Tsutaya; Tokyo, Japan	
