= Mao (disambiguation) =

Mao Zedong (1893–1976) was the chairman of the Chinese Communist Party from 1943 to 1976 and leader of the People's Republic of China between 1949 and 1976.

Mao, or MAO, may also refer to:

== People and tribes ==
- Mao (given name), Japanese given name
- Mao (surname), Chinese surname
- Mão, nickname of Brazilian beach soccer goalkeeper, Jenílson Rodrigues

== Cultures ==
- Mao languages, a group of Omotic languages in western Ethiopia
- Anfillo language, which is also called the Southern Mao language
- Mao people (India), Naga tribe in India
  - Mao language (India), the language of the Mao people in India
- A division of Shan people in Southeast Asia

== Acronyms ==
- Manual analog override, see manual override
- Maximum tolerable period of disruption, also known as maximum allowable/acceptable outage
- Methylaluminoxane, a pyrophoric white solid
- Molėtai Astronomical Observatory, Lithuania
- Monoamine oxidase, a family of enzymes
- Plasma electrolytic oxidation, also known as microarc oxidation

== Codes ==
- Eduardo Gomes International Airport (IATA: MAO), in Manaus, Brazil
- Martins Heron railway station (National Rail code: MAO), in Berkshire, United Kingdom
- Madgaon Junction railway station in Margao, Goa, India

== Entertainment and media ==
- Mao (card game), a card game
- MAO (manga), a Japanese manga series
- Maō (TV series), a Japanese television series
- Mao Mao: Heroes of Pure Heart, an American animated television series
- Mao: The Unknown Story, a 2005 biography of Chinese Communist leader Mao Zedong
- Mao, a character in the anime series Endro!

== Places ==
- Mahón, also known as Maó, a city on Menorca, Spain
- Mäo (disambiguation), several places
- Mao, Chad, a city in Chad
- Mao County, in Sichuan, China
- Santa Cruz de Mao, also known as Mao, a municipality of the Valverde province in the Dominican Republic
- Mao (Vidhan Sabha constituency), a legislative assembly constituency in Manipur state, India

== Other uses ==
- Mah or Mao, the Zoroastrianism's divinity of the moon
- Mao (bird), a bird species Gymnomyza samoensis
- Mao (currency), 1/10 of a Chinese yuan
- Mao (restaurant chain), Asian-cuisine restaurant chain in Dublin, Ireland
- Ma‘o, a Hawaiian name for a species of cotton
- Maō, a demon or devil in Japanese mythology, folklore, and fiction
- Maotai, a brand of distilled Chinese liquor
- Mǎo (昴), the Chinese name of the Pleiades
  - Hairy Head, a Chinese constellation

== See also ==
- Mu Alpha Theta (ΜΑΘ), the United States mathematics honor society for high school and two-year college students
