= Kadokawa Light Novel Expo 2020 =

Light novel convention in Japan

Kadokawa Light Novel Expo 2020 logo

Kadokawa Light Novel Expo 2020 (Japanese: KADOKAWAライトノベルEXPO 2020, Hepburn: KADOKAWA raitonoberu ekisupo 2020) is the first annual Kadokawa Light Novel Expo held by Kadokawa and Kimirano, which originally set on October 10 to October 11, 2020, in Tokorozawa Sakura Town, but has been postponed to March 6 - April 11, 2021 simultaneously in the website as the main venue and Tokorozawa Sakura Town as the sub venue, due to the COVID-19 pandemic. This event hosted many writers of light novel series from Kadokawa's Light Novel imprints, such as Dengeki Bunko, Fujimi Fantasia Bunko, Kadokawa Sneaker Bunko, MF Bunko J and Famitsu Bunko. It has more than 2.000 exclusive web autographed books by popular creators of more than 100 different titles of five different imprints, which sold at The Da Vinci Store. It also has the special set events, such as Sword Art Online (Dengeki Bunko), Date A Live (Fujimi Fantasia Bunko), and Re:Zero − Starting Life in Another World (MF Bunko J).

== Heroines ==
The heroines from series that represented the main 5 Light Novel imprints are:

- Dengeki Bunko
  - Asuna Yuuki (結城 明日奈, Yūki Asuna)
    Light Novel: Sword Art Online
  - Miyuki Shiba (司波 深雪, Shiba Miyuki)
    Light Novel: The Irregular at Magic High School
  - Vladilena Mirizé (ヴラディレーナ・ミリーゼ, Varadirēna Mirīze)
    Light Novel: 86
- Famitsu Bunko
  - Cayna (ケーナ, Kēna)
    Light Novel: In the Land of Leadale
  - Mizuki Himeji (姫路 瑞希, Himeji Mizuki)
    Light Novel: Baka and Test
  - Sizilien "Sicily" von Claude (シシリー＝フォン＝クロード, Shishirī fon Kurōdo)
    Light Novel: Wise Man's Grandchild
- Fujimi Fantasia Bunko
  - Aliceliese Lou Nebulis IX (アリスリーゼ・ルー・ネブリス9世, Arisurīze rū Neburisu Kyūsei)
    Light Novel: Our Last Crusade or the Rise of a New World
  - Lina Inverse (リナ・インバース, Rina Inbāsu)
    Light Novel: Slayers
  - Tohka Yatogami (夜刀神 十香, Yatogami Tōka)
    Light Novel: Date A Live
- Kadokawa Sneaker Bunko
  - Aqua (アクア, Akua)
    Light Novel: KonoSuba
  - Deedlit (テイードリット, Teīdoritto)
    Light Novel: Record of Lodoss War
  - Haruhi Suzumiya (涼宮 ハルヒ, Suzumiya Haruhi)
    Light Novel: Haruhi Suzumiya
- MF Bunko J
  - Kei Karuizawa (軽井沢 恵, Karuizawa Kei)
    Light Novel: Classroom of the Elite
  - Lisellia (リーセリア, Rīseria)
    Light Novel: The Demon Sword Master of Excalibur Academy
  - Shiro (白, Shiro)
    Light Novel: No Game No Life

== Stages ==
=== Presentation Stages ===
The presentation Stages held on March 6–7, 2021, with Chiaki Matsuzawa as the host of this event. The following anime announcements of the presentation plan section, which held on March 6–7, 2021, such as:

Name	Guest	Imprints
86	Shōya Chiba, Ikumi Hasegawa	Dengeki Bunko
Osamake: Romcom Where The Childhood Friend Won't Lose	Yoshitsugu Matsuoka, Ayane Sakura, Saori Onishi, Nobunaga Shimazaki	Dengeki Bunko
Strike the Blood	Risa Taneda, Rina Hidaka, Asami Seto	Dengeki Bunko
Sword Art Online / Sword Art Online Progressive: Aria of a Starless Night	Yoshitsugu Matsuoka, Rina Hidaka	Dengeki Bunko
The Irregular at Magic High School	Saori Hayami, Yuiko Tatsumi	Dengeki Bunko
In the Land of Leadale	N/A	Famitsu Bunko
Date A Live	Nobunaga Shimazaki, Marina Inoue, Asami Sanada	Fujimi Fantasia Bunko
The Saint's Magic Power Is Omnipotent	Yui Ishikawa, Takuya Eguchi	Kadokawa Books
Banished from the Heroes' Party	Ryōta Suzuki, Kanon Takao, Naomi Ōzora	Kadokawa Sneaker Bunko
Combatants Will Be Dispatched!	Yusuke Shirai, Miyu Tomita	Kadokawa Sneaker Bunko
Higehiro: After Being Rejected, I Shaved and Took In a High School Runaway	Kazuyuki Okitsu, Kana Ichinose, Hisako Kanemoto, Kaori Ishihara, Yusuke Kobayashi, Natsumi Kawaida	Kadokawa Sneaker Bunko
Redo of Healer	Yuya Hozumi, Ayano Shibuya, Shizuka Ishigami	Kadokawa Sneaker Bunko
The World's Finest Assassin Gets Reincarnated in Another World as an Aristocrat	Kenji Akabane, Reina Ueda, Yūki Takada, Shino Shimoji	Kadokawa Sneaker Bunko
Remake Our Life!	Masahiro Itou, Aoi Koga, Aimi, Nao Toyama, Haruki Ishiya	MF Bunko J
Full Dive: This Ultimate Next-Gen Full Dive RPG Is Even Shittier than Real Life!	Daiki Yamashita, Ayana Taketatsu, Ai Fairouz, Aoi Koga	MF Bunko J
The Detective Is Already Dead	Shin Nagai, Saki Miyashita, Ayana Taketatsu, Kanon Takao, Saho Shirasu	MF Bunko J
Mushoku Tensei	Yumi Uchiyama, Ai Kakuma, Yuiko Ōhara	MF Books
The Rising of the Shield Hero	Asami Seto, Rina Hidaka	MF Books

The following game announcements of the presentation section such as:

Game	Genre	Guest	Developer / Publisher
Onegai, ore wo Genjitsu ni Modosanaide! Symphonia Stage (Oresute)	Rhythm Game	Yurina Uchiyama, Miyari Nemoto, Chisa Suganuma	WonderPlanet Inc., Kadokawa
Fantasia Re:Build	Role Playing Game	Aoi Koga, Yūki Kuwahara, Ayana Taketatsu	DMMGames
Re:Zero − Starting Life in Another World: Lost in Memories	Action role-playing	Yusuke Kobayashi, Rie Takahashi, Yumi Uchiyama	Sega
Sword Art Online	Role Playing Game	Yoshitsugu Matsuoka, Rina Hidaka, Nobunaga Shimazaki	Bandai Namco Entertainment

=== New Anime Announcements ===
The following new anime announcements of the New work announcement sections, such as:

Name	Imprints
Sabikui Bisco	Dengeki Bunko
The Devil Is a Part-Timer!	Dengeki Bunko
The Misfit of Demon King Academy	Dengeki Bunko
The Greatest Demon Lord Is Reborn as a Typical Nobody	Fujimi Fantasia Bunko

== Autograph Sessions ==
The web Autograph Sessions held on March 6–7, 2021. The list of Light Novel's author and illustrator participated in autograph session are:

Title	Author	Artist	Imprint
86	Asato Asato	Shirabi	Dengeki Bunko
Kino's Journey	Keiichi Sigsawa	Kouhaku Kuroboshi	Dengeki Bunko
Reign of the Seven Spellblades	Bokuto Uno	Ruria Miyuki	Dengeki Bunko
Osamake: Romcom Where The Childhood Friend Won't Lose	Shūichi Nimaru	Ui Shigure*	Dengeki Bunko
Rascal Does Not Dream of Bunny Girl Senpai	Hajime Kamoshida	Keeji Mizoguchi	Dengeki Bunko
Sword Art Online	Reki Kawahara	Abec	Dengeki Bunko
GENESIS Series: Horizon in the Middle of Nowhere NEXT BOX	Minoru Kawakami	TENKY*	Dengeki no Shin Bungei
Unnamed Memory	Kuji Furumiya	chibi*	Dengeki no Shin Bungei
Wise Man's Grandchild	Tsuyoshi Yoshioka	Seiji Kikuchi	Famitsu Bunko
Akashic Records of Bastard Magic Instructor	Tarō Hitsuji	Kurone Mishima	Fujimi Fantasia Bunko
Date A Live	Kōshi Tachibana	Tsunako	Fujimi Fantasia Bunko
Full Metal Panic!	Shoji Gatoh	Shiki Douji	Fujimi Fantasia Bunko
Our Last Crusade or the Rise of a New World	Kei Sazane	Ao Nekonabe*	Fujimi Fantasia Bunko
Slayers	Hajime Kanzaka	Rui Araizumi	Fujimi Fantasia Bunko
Banished from the Heroes' Party	Zappon	Yasumo	Kadokawa Sneaker Bunko
Higehiro: After Being Rejected, I Shaved and Took In a High School Runaway	Shimesaba	Booota*	Kadokawa Sneaker Bunko
Record of Lodoss War: Diadem of the Covenant	Ryo Mizuno	Hidari	Kadokawa Sneaker Bunko
The World's Finest Assassin Gets Reincarnated in Another World as an Aristocrat	Rui Tsukiyo	Reia	Kadokawa Sneaker Bunko
Remake Our Life!	Nachi Kio	Eretto	MF Bunko J
Liar, Liar	Haruki Kuou	Konomi*	MF Bunko J
No Game No Life	Yū Kamiya		MF Bunko J
The Demon Sword Master of Excalibur Academy	Yū Shimizu	Asagi Tōsaka	MF Bunko J
The Detective Is Already Dead	Nigojū	Umibōzu	MF Bunko J

Note:

- (*): Abstain for participate from this session, although the illustrators still sign their autographs along with Authors.

== Best Selection 2020 ==
Kadokawa Light Novel Expo Best Selection 2020 nomination held on January 25, 2021, until February 25, 2021. In the results announcement, Chiaki Matsuzawa served as the host, Yui Ogura and Rina Hidaka as the guest, and Ryu Yamazaki, The Light novel YouTuber, announced the winners based on the categories. The following series that inducted into the results include:

The Strongest Protagonist

Rank	Title	Author	Artist	Imprint
1	Sword Art Online	Reki Kawahara	Abec	Dengeki Bunko
2	The Irregular at Magic High School	Tsutomu Satou	Kana Ishida	Dengeki Bunko
3	In the Land of Leadale	Ceez	Tenmaso	Famitsu Bunko
4	Slayers	Hajime Kanzaka	Rui Araizumi	Fujimi Fantasia Bunko
5	Aria the Scarlet Ammo	Chūgaku Akamatsu	Kobuichi	MF Bunko J

The Supreme Heroine

Rank	Title	Author	Artist	Imprint
01	Saekano: How to Raise a Boring Girlfriend	Fumiaki Maruto	Kurehito Misaki	Fujimi Fantasia Bunko
02	Haruhi Suzumiya	Nagaru Tanigawa	Noizi Ito	Kadokawa Sneaker Bunko
03	Book Girl	Mizuki Nomura	Miho Takeoka	Famitsu Bunko
04	Spice and Wolf	Isuna Hasekura	Jū Ayakura	Dengeki Bunko
05	The Familiar of Zero	Noboru Yamaguchi	Eiji Usatsuka	MF Bunko J

Perfect Bonds of Partners

Rank	Title	Author	Artist	Imprint
01	No Game No Life	Yū Kamiya		MF Bunko J
02	The Detective Is Already Dead	Nigojū	Umibōzu	MF Bunko J
03	Adachi and Shimamura	Hitoma Iruma	Non; Shizue Kaneko	Dengeki Bunko

The Best Team

Rank	Title	Author	Artist	Imprint
01	Baka and Test	Kenji Inoue	Yui Haga	Famitsu Bunko
02	Spy Classroom	Takemachi	Tomari	Fujimi Fantasia Bunko
03	Liar Liar	Haruki Kuou	Konomi	MF Bunko J

The Finest Comedy

Rank	Title	Author	Artist	Imprint
01	KonoSuba	Natsume Akatsuki	Kurone Mishima	Kadokawa Sneaker Bunko
02	Student Council's Discretion	Aoi Sekina	Kira Inugami	Fujimi Fantasia Bunko
03	The Devil Is a Part-Timer!	Satoshi Wagahara	Oniku	Dengeki Bunko

Immortal Youth

Rank	Title	Author	Artist	Imprint
01	Rascal Does Not Dream of Bunny Girl Senpai	Hajime Kamoshida	Keeji Mizoguchi	Dengeki Bunko
02	Toradora!	Yuyuko Takemiya	Yasu	Dengeki Bunko
03	Haganai	Yomi Hirasaka	Buriki	MF Bunko J

Blissful Moe

Rank	Title	Author	Artist	Imprint
01	Date A Live	Kōshi Tachibana	Tsunako	Fujimi Fantasia Bunko
02	Osamake: Romcom Where The Childhood Friend Won't Lose	Shūichi Nimaru	Shigure Ui	Dengeki Bunko
03	The "Hentai" Prince and the Stony Cat.	Sou Sagara	Kantoku	MF Bunko J

Sensational Gem

Rank	Title	Author	Artist	Imprint
01	Re:Zero − Starting Life in Another World	Tappei Nagatsuki	Shinichirou Ootsuka	MF Bunko J
02	WorldEnd	Akira Kareno	Ue	Kadokawa Sneaker Bunko
03	86	Asato Asato	Shirabi	Dengeki Bunko

Infinite Passion

Rank	Title	Author	Artist	Imprint
01	Classroom of the Elite	Shōgo Kinugasa	Shunsaku Tomose	MF Bunko J
02	A Certain Magical Index	Kazuma Kamachi	Kiyotaka Haimura	Dengeki Bunko
03	High School DxD	Ichiei Ishibumi	Miyama-Zero	Fujimi Fantasia Bunko

Echanted Immorality

Rank	Title	Author	Artist	Imprint
01	The Testament of Sister New Devil	Tetsuto Uesu	Nekosuke Ōkuma	Kadokawa Sneaker Bunko
02	Redo of Healer	Rui Tsukiyo	Shiokonbu	Kadokawa Sneaker Bunko
03	Ken'yuu-sha Sikorski Zeelife no Oinaru Tankyuu	Uzo Toshimichi	Karei	Dengeki Bunko

== See also ==
- Kadokawa Light Novel Expo
