= In the Land of Leadale =

Japanese light novel series

- First light novel volume cover

リアデイルの大地にて (Riadeiru no Daichi nite)
- Novel series
- Written by: Ceez
- Published by: Shōsetsuka ni Narō
- Original run: November 2010 – December 2012
- Light novel
- Written by: Ceez
- Illustrated by: Tenmaso
- Published by: Enterbrain
- English publisher: NA: Yen Press
- Imprint: Famitsu Bunko
- Original run: January 2019 – present
- Volumes: 8
- Manga
- Written by: Ceez; Ryō Suzukaze (composition)
- Illustrated by: Dashio Tsukimi
- Published by: ASCII Media Works
- English publisher: NA: Yen Press
- Imprint: Dengeki Comics Next
- Magazine: Dengeki PlayStation Comic Web
- Original run: July 2019 – present
- Volumes: 7
- Anime television series
- Directed by: Takeyuki Yanase
- Written by: Kazuyuki Fudeyasu
- Music by: Kujira Yumemi
- Studio: Maho Film
- Licensed by: Crunchyroll
- Original network: Tokyo MX, SUN, KBS, BS NTV, AT-X
- Original run: January 5, 2022 – March 23, 2022
- Episodes: 12

In the Land of Leadale (リアデイルの大地にて, Riadeiru no Daichi nite) is a Japanese light novel series written by Ceez and illustrated by Tenmaso. It was serialized online between November 2010 and December 2012 on the user-generated novel publishing website Shōsetsuka ni Narō. It was later acquired by Enterbrain, who have published eight volumes since January 2019 under their Famitsu Bunko imprint.

A manga adaptation with art by Dashio Tsukimi and composition by Ryō Suzukaze has been serialized online via ASCII Media Works' Dengeki PlayStation Comic Web website since July 2019 and has been collected in seven tankōbon volumes. Both the light novel and manga are licensed in North America by Yen Press. An anime television series adaptation by Maho Film aired from January to March 2022.

== Plot summary ==
In Japan, a VR-accessed multi-player online fantasy role-playing game (VRMMORPG) named Leadale, which offers a very liberal customization system, has become immensely popular in recent years. A young girl named Keina Kagami, rendered permanently paralyzed and on constant life support, uses this game from her hospital bed to interact with the rest of the world. When she unexpectedly dies after her life support shuts down during a power outage, she finds herself transported into the game world of Leadale, in the body of her personal avatar Cayna. To her surprise, she also finds out that 200 years have passed in Leadale since she last logged into the game, a period in which the seven kingdoms she knew were devastated by war and re-organized into three new kingdoms: Felskeilo, Helshper and Otaloquess.

As Cayna begins making her way in this new world and meeting the three NPC children she had created in the game, she finds out that her death sparked rumors that ruined Leadale's reputation and caused the game to be shut down. However, several other players also ended up trapped inside the game as well, some of them for years. The current kingdoms are also increasingly plagued by attacks from high-level monsters, all stemming from Leadale's abrupt cancellation, which made them go rogue inside this world. What's more, after she re-encounters her former in-game mentor, Opus, she learns that Leadale was specifically created to help her out of her isolation following her accident, but was commercialized afterwards. The game had, however, an unfortunate bug which displaced the minds of several players into the virtual Leadale world. After Keina's death, Opus synchronized the game system with her new elven soul, essentially making it into a real living world.

However, the cancellation of Leadale also meant that it was necessary to restrain the game's ultimate challenge elements, the Event Monsters, which have taken a life of their own. They were sealed inside the ruins of the former Brown Kingdom's capital, now known as the Abandoned Capital, but the barrier has begun to fray. Soon, all the players stuck inside the game must unite to stem a tide of unprecedented proportions which threatens to lay waste to the world of Leadale.

== Characters ==
=== Players and Skill Masters ===
Cayna (ケーナ, Kēna) / Keina Kagami (各務桂菜, Kagami Keina)
Voiced by: Eri Yukimura (Japanese); Xanthe Huynh (English)
Originally the 17-year-old daughter from a wealthy Japanese family, Keina was rendered a permanent hospital patient on life support for several years by a terrible accident in which her parents were killed. When her life support fails in the midst of a game session, Keina dies, but her mind is uploaded into the world of Leadale as her RPG avatar Cayna, a powerful Black Kingdom high elf mage (in-game level 1,100). In Leadale, she specializes in magic, and as an elf, she can also communicate with plants, which makes harvesting plant materials in her presence an unsettling undertaking for her.
In the game, Cayna is a member of the Cream Cheese guild, which consist of Limit Breakers and some of the more eccentric players. She had also attained the extremely rare title of being one of twenty-four Limit Breakers and the third of thirteen Skill Masters, who act as assistant game administrators and are capable of bestowing other player characters with free skills at will. When demands for these services kept mounting, Cayna was forced into seclusion, and the subsequent creation of several Guardian Towers to make those players actually earn these skills was initiated. After meeting Opus in Leadale again, she is shocked to discover that for some reason, Opus bonded her soul to the game's matrix after her death, essentially making her the game's living central processor and heartpiece. The assimilation took two centuries to complete, at the end of which time Opus arranged for her reawakening in Marelle's inn.
Cayna is infamously known under the bynames Silver Ring Witch (銀環の魔女, Gin Kan no Majo) and Ferocious Firepower, from the trademark power-boosting magical item she received upon becoming a Skill Master.
Opus (オプス, Opusu) / Opusketten-Shultheimer Crosstettbomber (オペケッテンシュルトハイマー・クロステットボンバー, Opekettenshurutohaimā Kurosutetobonbā) / Rin Kuzuhara (葛原 林, Kuzuhara Rin)
Leadale's thirteenth Skill Master and a Black Kingdom demon avatar (level 1,100) of a player ostensibly installed by Leadale's administrative company to observe the game and report any bugs or malfunctions. His accumulated knowledge of the game's and its players' procedures has made him a master strategist, earning him the nickname "Leadale's Kongming". Like Cayna, he was a member of Cream Cheese and also served as Keina's mentor when she had first entered the game. Crescent Moon Castle, his Guardian Tower in the kingdom of Helshper, is a reflection of his penchant for sadism, as it is riddled with all kinds of deadly traps; hence it is known as the House of Murder and Malice.
It is only much later, after Cayna meets Opus in Leadale again, that she learns that Opus is actually one of the Leadale game's original creators and administrators named Rin Kuzuhara, who once visited Keina at the hospital to introduce her to the game. He was also responsible for the restructuring of the lands of Leadale into three new kingdoms and the exile of the Event Monsters into the Abandoned Capital after the game ended its service. Some time after their reunion, he raises Cayna's level to 1,109 and gives her a set of new special abilities.
Shining Saber (シャイニングセイバー, Shaininguseibā)
Voiced by: Makoto Yasumura (Japanese); Adin Rudd (English)
A sliver dragoid player avatar (level 427), current leader of the Felskeilo Knights, and former subleader of the Silver Moon Horsemen Guild.
Cohral (コーラル, Kōraru)
Voiced by: Kentarō Kumagai (Japanese); Griffin Puatu (English)
A male human adventurer player avatar (level 392) and a former guildmate of Shining Saber. His user has been trapped inside his avatar for ten years in Leadale, making him reach his early thirties.
Quolkeh (クオルケ, Kuoruke)
Voiced by: Shun Horie
A female human adventurer player avatar (level 430) for a male user, who apparently used a "hack" on the game system in order to play as a female. A relatively new player, she met up with Exis by chance after the game service ended. Her true gender is revealed by her frequent lapses into masculine speech; in the anime series, it is additionally emphasized by the use of a male voice actor.
Exis (エクシズ, Ekushizu)
Voiced by: Ryuichi Kijima (Japanese); Matthew David Rudd (English)
A dragoid adventurer player avatar (level 630) whose name is a shortening of Xxxxxxxxxxxx. Exis was a secondary character used by the player Tartarus (nicknamed "Tartar Sauce" by Cayna, and "Tartaroast" by Opus), who is also a member of the Cream Cheese Guild.
Luvrogue (コイローグ, Koirōgu)
Voiced by: Showtaro Morikubo
A Leadale player with a demon avatar. After getting stranded in Leadale and being convinced this was still "just a game", he became a bandit leader and started wreaking havoc in Helshper to level up. Easily defeated by Cayna, but proving virtually unkillable by execution because of the game's health point system, he was instead sentenced to hard labor in a mine. After spending some time under forced labor, Caerina (Cayna's granddaughter and captain of the Helsheper knights) takes him in as a recruit for Helspher's army.
Marvelia (マーベリア, Māberia)
Leadale's first Skill Master, whose avatar was a werecat. She has a compulsion to collect information and compile it into statistics, and she thrives on tests to her intellect. Her Guardian Tower is one of the few ones with no fixed location; it is instead located in the innards of a huge whale, and its interior decorations were originally meant to emulate a setting from Pinocchio, her favorite childhood story.
Liothek
Leadale's sixth Skill Master, a female player who has an extreme passion for creepy things and pets, like amphibians, mollusks and crustaceans. Her Guardian Tower, the Palace of the Dragon King, is located underwater near the Felskeilo coastline, near Luka's former home village.
Kyotaro
Leadale's ninth Skill Master who used a dragoid as his game avatar, and the master of the Silver Moon Horsemen Guild. His Guardian Tower is located on the site on which the Felskeilo capitol arena is erected during the 200-year span between Keina's last login and her rebirth.
Kujo
Leadale's second Skill Master. His mobile Guardian Tower, which is located on the back of a titanic turtle, is a TV station guarded by a living Buddha statue who challenges intruders to a hundred-questions quiz about the game.
Hidden Ogre ("Gramps")
Leadale's twelfth Skill Master (level 800), with a dwarf avatar. On Earth, he was a retiree who now regrets that he spent too much time with the game after his wife died. To alleviate his loneliness, he used the Foster System to adopt 108 little sisters. He was also trapped in Leadale when the game was taken offline, and has regularly sought out Kujo's Guardian Tower to try and solve its quiz. His Guardian Tower is a traditional Japanese mansion floating in the sky.
Jaeger
A player (level 800) who uses a huge, muscular human as his avatar. He is the former leader of the Silver Watches, a guild based in the former Red Kingdom. He is both a close friend and a rival of Opus (who he habitually calls "Heimer"), with whom he had alternatively clashed and cooperated during the game era. After getting stranded in Leadale, he opened a curio shop and got married.
Ark
A female Leadale player (level 230) who was introduced to the game by her younger brother Exis/Tartarus and has since become a member of Felskelio's Imperial Knight corps after getting trapped in Leadale. Like Cayna, she has ended up nicknaming her brother's original avatar "Tartar Sauce".

=== Summons and Familiars ===
Kee (キー, Kī)
Voiced by: Yui Otagiri (Japanese); Laura Post (English)
An AI support unit created by Keina's uncle to assist her after she was permanently paralyzed. After her rebirth in Leadale, Cayna is still able to access it (consequently, only she can perceive and interact with Key, although later Opus is later found to have that ability as well), and it serves as her advisor and protector.
Li'l Fairy (妖精ちゃん, Yōsei-chan) / Kuu (クウ, Kū)
A game character appearing as a type of familiar, this tiny, green-haired fairy was bequeathed to Cayna by Opus when she sought his Guardian Tower out. Because of her nature, initially only Cayna and the other players stuck in Leadale can see her. After Opus prompts her, Cayna eventually names the fairy "Kuu" (as a counterpart to Kee), thus giving her a material form. It is later revealed that Kuu is a manifestation of the Leadale game's subsystem installed into Cayna.
Roxilius (ロキシリウス, Rokishiriusu) and Roxine (ロキシン, Rokishin)
Voiced by: Nanako Mori (Roxilius) and Hisako Tōjō (Roxine) (Japanese); Jacob Hopkins (Roxilius) and Amber Lee Connors (Roxine) (English)
A werecat pair of butler and maid (both level 550), and originally NPCs summoned by Cayna's magic while playing the game on Earth; Roxilius was created by Cayna, but Opus added Roxine as a gesture of his twisted humor. Upon first summoning Roxilius some time after her rebirth in Leadale, Cayna discovered that Roxilius inexplicably did not disappear after his summoning duration had expired, so she also summoned Roxine to have them both take over the daily chores in her newly founded household. While Roxilius is well-behaved and polite, Roxine is confrontational, arrogant and sharp-tongued, especially against Roxilius. This rivalry habitually results in bitter duels between the two, which Cayna must break up on an all-too regular basis. Their names are a reference to the number 64 (六十四, rokujūshi), which stands for Keina's birthday on June 4.
Heigl (ヘイグル, Heiguru)
Voiced by: Tayuka Makimura (Japanese); Landon McDonald (English)
A centaur warrior (level 250) who is occasionally summoned by Cayna as an auxiliary.
Siren
A beautiful black-haired elven maid summons (level 550) created by Opus. While she is very polite and sweet to strangers, she is not that way to Opus, showering him with scathing remarks all the time after he displaced himself into the Leadale world, whereas she was submissive and obedient before, much to Opus' own surprise. Due to a cheat Opus used, she is also much stronger than her level would indicate. After Opus and she move in with Cayna in the Remote Village, she becomes the household's headmaid.

=== Kingdom of Felskeilo ===
Skargo (スカルゴ, Sukarugo)
Voiced by: Daisuke Ono (Japanese); Chris Niosi (English)
A male high elf priest (level 300), and Cayna's first child, adopted via the game's Foster System, which converts unused alternative player characters into named NPCs when adopted by an active player. He is specialized in healing magic, and is highly revered in the kingdom of Felskeilo due to his radiant personality, which usually manifests his moods in an illusionary aura of flowers (a peculiar but essentially useless special effect added by the game's administrators). However, he also has an unbelievably huge mother complex.
Mai-Mai (マイマイ, Maimai)
Voiced by: Kaori Nazuka (Japanese); Veronica Taylor (English)
A female high elf archmage (level 300), and Cayna's second child. She tends to be a bit airheaded and exuberant, especially about her mother. Formerly a magician at Felskeilo's royal court, she now occupies the position of headmistress of the local Royal Academy. Married twice, she had fraternal twin children with her first husband.
Kartatz (カータツ, Kātatsu)
Voiced by: Tomokazu Sugita (Japanese); Keith Silverstein (English)
A male dwarf shipwright (level 300) at the wharfs of Felskeilo's capital, and Cayna's third child. While he is the most level-headed of his siblings and loves his mother, he does not enjoy being treated like a child in public, keen to preserve his image as a tough, no-nonsense boss. He is also responsible for "baptizing" (i.e., physically disciplining) new recruits and unruly elements among Felskeilo's royal knights.
Luka (ルカ, Ruka)
Voiced by: Kanon Takao (Japanese); Lizzie Freeman (English)
A pre-adolescent human girl who originally lived in a Felskeilo fishing village near one of the Guardian Towers, the Palace of the Dragon King. Her village was eradicated when an undead Event Monster released a death mist on the settlement, turning its inhabitants into zombies; Luka escaped that fate because she was inside a magically warded storehouse. After being rescued by Cayna, Quolkeh and Exis, she is taken in by Cayna as her new adopted daughter.
Lytt (リット, Ritto)
Voiced by: Kanako Yanagihara (Japanese); Corina Boettger (English)
Marelle's younger, pre-adolescent daughter who befriends Cayna and adores her for her magic and her kindness.
Marelle (マレール, Marēru)
Voiced by: Sakura Nakamura (Japanese); Dorothy Elias-Fahn (English)
The proprietress of the Remote Village inn in which Keina awakens when reborn in Leadale. While being a maternal type of person, she does not hesitate to clout on the head anyone who vexes her.
Luine (ルイネ, Ruine)
Voiced by: Yuuki Hirose (Japanese); Laura Post (English)
Marelle's oldest, adult daughter.
Gatt (ガット, Gatto)
Marelle's husband and co-owner of the inn.
Lottor (ロト, Roto)
Voiced by: Hiroki Matsukawa
A hunter in the Remote Village.
Elineh (エーリネ, Erine)
Voiced by: Tomoaki Maeno (Japanese); Mick Lauer (English)
A well-known and friendly kobold merchant. Even though he is the owner of a large trading company, he prefers to travel and peddle his wares in person. His design is patterned after a Welsh Corgi.
Armuna (アルムーニャ, Arumūnya)
Voiced by: Nozomi Furuki
A female kobold, and Elineh's wife and co-owner of their merchant business. She uses a magical item to disguise herself as a human and joke-shock new customers with it. Her appearance is similar to a black and white papillon
Arbiter (アービタ, Ābita)
Voiced by: Shinji Kawada (Japanese); Billy Kametz (English)
The leader of the Flame Spears, a mercenary company employed by Elineh as caravan guards, and the former captain of the Felskeilo knights. Ever since Cayna saved one of his men from a lethal injury, he holds her in the highest regard, although he is occasionally disconcerted by her casual use of her tremendous magical powers.
Kenison (ケニソン, Kenison)
Voiced by: Ryuichi Kijima
A member of the Flame Spears whom Cayna saved from a fatal injury.
Lopus Harvey (ロプス・ハーヴェイ, Ropusu Hāvuei)
Voiced by: Katsuyuki Konishi (Japanese); Chris Hackney (English)
A human professor for alchemy at Felskeilo's Royal Academy, and Mai-Mai's second husband. He is the son of a baron family who owns the land the Remote Village is on.
"Primo" (伝助, "Densuke")
Voiced by: Mutsumi Tamura (Japanese); Sarah Anne Williams (English)
The pre-adolescent royal prince of Felskeilo who is annoyed with his life in the royal palace and keeps running away to play with his friends in the capital's streets. After Cayna helps retrieving him shortly after arriving in the city, he becomes determined to find out her true nature, suspecting that she has something sinister in mind. Because Lonti interrupted herself before giving away the boy's secret identity, the fractional "den-" (from 殿下 denka; "Highness" in Japanese) she uttered was used by Cayna, who is aware of the boy's true nature, to nickname him "Densuke". (In the English translation, she uses "Primo" - from "Pri-" for "prince" - instead.)
Agaido (アガイド, Agaido)
Voiced by: Tomomichi Nishimura (Japanese); Mick Lauer (English)
Felskeilo's prime minister. He maintains a very active network of spies to inform him of any undue activities, and keeps himself well-informed about Cayna's escapades in the Felskelio capital.
Lonti Arbalest (ロンティ・アバレスト, Ronti Abaresuto)
Voiced by: Natsuko Abe (Japanese); Ryan Bartley (English)
Agaido's granddaughter, a shy marquess, first-year student at the Royal Academy of Felskeilo, and Primo's stressed-out minder.
Myleene Luskelio (マイリーン・ルスケリオ, Mairīn Rusukerio)
Voiced by: Marika Kouno (Japanese); Skyler Davenport (English)
Felskeilo's crown princess, Primo's older sister, and a friend of Lonti's from the Royal Academy who has a vast crush on Skargo.
Almana (アルマナ, Arumana)
Voiced by: Yui Fukuo (Japanese); Sarah Anne Williams (English)
A red-haired female human clerk at the Felskeilo Adventurers' Guild.
Mimily (ミミリイ, Mimiri)
Voiced by: Yui Ninomiya (Japanese); Colleen O'Shaughnessey (English)
A mermaid who was made an outcast in her village after failing to meet her people's expectations for becoming a princess and securing their race's continuance. She was later trapped by a freak magical portal in an underwater vein near the Remote Village. Cayna ends up rescuing her and offering her quarters in the village, where Mimily has founded a laundry business.
Triste and Alnassi
The king and queen of Felskeilo, respectively.

=== Kingdom of Helshper ===
Caerina Sakai (ケイリナ・堺, Keirina Sakai)
Voiced by: Azusa Tadokoro (Japanese); Erin Yvette (English)
Mai-Mai's older daughter, a young elf who is the captain and combat instructor for the Knights of Helshper.
Caerick Sakai (ケイリック・堺, Keirikku Sakai)
Voiced by: Tomoya Takagi (Japanese); Landon McDonald (English)
Mai-Mai's younger son, an elf merchant in Helshper and owner of an intercontinentally very successful business named Sakaiya.
Idzik (イジク, Ijiku)
Voiced by: Taku Yashiro
Caerick's son, Cayna's great-grandson and Sakaiya's deputy master.
Lux (ルクス, Rukusu), Sunya (スンヤ, Sun'ya), Dogai (ドガイ, Dogai) and Latem (ラテム, Ratemu)
A family group of Helshper engineers in Caerick's employ who came to Lytt's village to study a water-drawing mechanism Cayna had invented for the villagers' comfort. While Lux, Dogai and Latem are dwarves, Sunya is a human; additionally, Lux and Sunya are a married couple, Dogai is Lux's apprentice, and Latem is Lux's pre-adolescent son from a previous marriage.

=== Kingdom of Otaloquess ===
Sahana (サハナ, Sahana)
Sahana is a high-elf player avatar and Cayna's adopted sister.
Sahalashade (サハラシエード, Saharashiēdo)
Sahana's daughter through the game's Foster System, Cayna's niece, and the reigning queen of the kingdom of Otaloquess. Her prime duty is to watch the barriers around the Abandoned Capital, the former capital of the Game Era's Brown Kingdom which is now a haven for powerful monsters. She, as well as her prime minister and captain of the royal knights, are oddly aware of their true natures in the Leadale game.
Cloffe (クロフ, Kurofu) and Clofia (クロフィア, Kurofia)
Two brother and sister werecat spies from the kingdom of Otaloquess (level 80). Similar to Roxilius and Roxine, Cloffe, as the male, is polite and composed, while Clofia is very aggressive and temperamental.

=== Others ===
Keisuke Kagami
The younger brother of Keina's father and the owner of the company who created Leadale, who became Keina's guardian after her parents' death. He has a daughter named Ako.
Igdukyz (イグドゥキス, Igudōukisu)
An evil minor devil subservient to Leadale's Lord of the Night, also known as the Dream God. His body has the shape of a roughly humanoid tree, with a human skull floating inside a hollow in its trunk. Considering himself a sculptor, he has the unsavory habit of reshaping living human beings into gruesomely bizarre works of "art", and creating art which twists the minds of anyone beholding it.
Drekdovai (ドレクドバイ, Dorekudobai)
Igdukyz's partner, a huge black-scaled, six-armed Demon Dragoid.

== Media ==
=== Light novel ===
In the Land of Leadale is written by Ceez and illustrated by Tenmaso. Originally serialized online on the Shōsetsuka ni Narō website between November 2010 and December 2012, Enterbrain began publishing the series in print in January 2019 under their Famitsu Bunko imprint. Eight volumes have been released so far. Yen Press licensed the series in North America.

No.	Original release date	Original ISBN	English release date	English ISBN
1	January 30, 2019	978-4-04-735469-2	October 20, 2020	978-1-9753-0868-1
2	May 30, 2019	978-4-04-735640-5	February 23, 2021	978-1-9753-0870-4
3	October 30, 2019	978-4-04-735802-7	July 27, 2021	978-1-9753-2216-8
4	March 30, 2020	978-4-04-736050-1	December 14, 2021	978-1-9753-2218-2
5	August 28, 2020	978-4-04-736220-8	April 26, 2022	978-1-9753-3344-7
6	February 27, 2021	978-4-04-736509-4	October 11, 2022	978-1-9753-3459-8
7	August 30, 2021	978-4-04-736702-9	December 13, 2022	978-1-9753-4391-0
8	January 28, 2022	978-4-04-736929-0	April 18, 2023	978-1-9753-6099-3

=== Manga ===
A manga adaptation illustrated by Dashio Tsukimi and composed by Ryō Suzukaze began serialization online via ASCII Media Works' Dengeki PlayStation Comic Web website in July 2019. Seven tankōbon volumes have been released so far. Yen Press has also licensed the manga in English.

No.	Original release date	Original ISBN	English release date	English ISBN
1	March 26, 2020	978-4-04-866984-9	May 17, 2022	978-1-9753-4163-3
2	August 26, 2020	978-4-04-913363-9	October 18, 2022	978-1-9753-4165-7
3	April 26, 2021	978-4-04-913759-0	March 21, 2023	978-1-9753-4167-1
4	January 8, 2022	978-4-04-914115-3	August 22, 2023	978-1-9753-5057-4
5	November 25, 2022	978-4-04-914725-4	January 23, 2024	978-1-9753-7381-8
6	October 27, 2023	978-4-04-915355-2	November 19, 2024	979-8-8554-0823-2
7	December 26, 2024	978-4-04-916034-5	February 24, 2026	979-8-8554-2424-9
8	August 27, 2026	978-4-04-916860-0	-	—

=== Anime ===
On February 22, 2021, an anime adaptation was announced. At "Kadokawa Light Novel Expo 2020", it was revealed to be a television series animated by Maho Film. The series is directed by Takeyuki Yanase, with scripts overseen by Kazuyuki Fudeyasu, character designs handled by Toshihide Matsudate, Eri Kojima, and Kaho Deguchi, and music composed by Kujira Yumemi. The series aired from January 5 to March 23, 2022, on Tokyo MX and other networks. The opening theme song is "Happy encount" by TRUE, while the ending theme song is "Hakoniwa no Kōfuku" (Happiness in a Miniature Garden) by Azusa Tadokoro. Crunchyroll streamed the series.

On January 13, 2022, Crunchyroll announced that the series will receive an English dub, which premiered on February 16.

==== Episode list ====
No.	Title	Directed by	Written by	Storyboarded by	Original release date (Note: Episodes are released every Wednesday at 11:00 p.m. JST on d Anime Store, 30 minutes before the original air time on Tokyo MX.)
1	"An Inn, a Tower, a Bear, and a Banquet"; Transliteration: "Yadoya to, Tō to, Kuma to, Enkai" (Japanese: 宿屋と、塔と、熊と、宴会)	Takeyuki Yanase	Kazuyuki Fudeyasu	Takeyuki Yanase	January 5, 2022 (Note: This episode was pre-screened on December 18, 2021.)
On Earth, in a Japanese hospital, permanently disabled patient Keina Kagami dies when her life support fails due to a power outage. To her immense surprise, she awakens in the world of Leadale, the setting of the role-playing game she had been using via virtual reality to interact with the rest of the world, as her avatar, the high elf mage Cayna. From the proprietors of the inn in which she awakens, she is shocked to learn that 200 years have passed since she last entered the game, and that the White Kingdom of Felstes and Green Kingdom of Gruskeilo - the settings she had played in - have merged into one kingdom about 60 years ago and have since descended into poverty; and from her AI support unit Kee, she also learns about what happened to her on Earth. Clueless about what to do, she decides to visit her Skill Master operation base in the game, the Silver Tower, only to be reminded by the tower's guardian that she has several children, whom she adopted through the game's Foster System, and to be asked to check out the other twelve Skill Masters' Guardian Towers. On her way back to the inn, she saves a hunter from a monster, and passes out from drinking wine at the subsequent feast.
2	"An Injured Man, the Royal Capital, and a Game of Tag with Sons"; Transliteration: "Keganin to, Ōto to, Musuko-tachi to, Onigokko" (Japanese: 怪我人と、王都と、息子たちと、鬼ごっこ)	Naoyoshi Kusaka	Kazuyuki Fudeyasu	Tetsuro Amino	January 12, 2022
The next morning, after waking up with a hangover, Cayna heals a mercenary who was attacked and critically wounded by an ogre when his company crossed the forest. Out of gratitude for saving their comrade's life, the mercenaries and their employer, kobold merchant Elineh, escort Cayna to Felskeilo's capital, where her children reside and where she hopes to find one of the Guardian Towers. She registers herself as an adventurer and manages to meet her dwarven son Kartatz, who subsequently informs his other siblings, Skargo and Mai-Mai, of their mother's presence in the city. However, soon afterwards Cayna unintentionally draws a lot of attention to herself when she responds to an Adventurers' Guild request to submit a potion to a student at the Royal Academy and later uses her magic in spectacular ways to help royal courtiers Agaido and Lonti in catching the kingdom's runaway royal prince, whom she nicknames "Primo".
3	"A Daughter, a Colosseum, Losing Control, and an Uppercut"; Transliteration: "Musume to, Tōgijō to, Bakusō to, Appākatto" (Japanese: 娘と、闘技場と、爆走と、アッパーカット)	Tomihiko Ōkubo	Kazuyuki Fudeyasu	Tomihiko Ōkubo	January 19, 2022
The next day, while looking for possible locations harboring Guardian Towers, Cayna receives a summons to the Royal Academy, where she meets her daughter Mai-Mai and her son-in-law Lopus Harvey, who quiz her about how to create a potion like the one she had submitted the previous day, via a method which is long lost. Later, she takes up a quest to exorcise a ghost from the capitol's colosseum, with "Primo" tailing her. When the ghost finally appears, Cayna finds out that it is actually the custodian of the Ninth Skill Master's Guardian Tower, which lies hidden beneath the colosseum, and is shocked to learn that after her death on Earth, the Leadale game was taken off-line. The guardian makes her the new mistress of its Tower, After Cayna realizes that she could never see her friends and family on Earth, she sinks into a deep depression. When the worried Skargo bursts in on her, Cayna, disgusted by his eccentricity, punches him straight through her inn room's ceiling before resuming her sulking.
4	"A Son, a Fight, a Journey, and Bandits"; Transliteration: "Musuko to, Kenka to, Tabi to, Yatō" (Japanese: 息子と、喧嘩と、旅と、野盗)	Hiroshi Saitō	Kazuyuki Fudeyasu	Kunihisa Sugishima	January 26, 2022
Cayna recovers very quickly from her depression, just as Kartatz seeks her out, and she gets properly introduced to Skargo. Later, Elineh hires her as a caravan guard while he travels to the neighboring kingdom of Helshper, since the usual route has been beset by bandits. Although they attempt to take an alternative route, they run into an ambush set by the bandits. However, thanks to Cayna's powerful magic and some summoned allies, the bandits are easily defeated, allowing the caravan to continue on its way.
5	"A Grandson, a Granddaughter, a Great-Grandson, and a Fortress"; Transliteration: "Magomusuko to, Magomusume to, Himago to, Toride" (Japanese: 孫息子と、孫娘と、曾孫と、砦)	Kyōhei Ōyabu	Kazuyuki Fudeyasu	Kyōhei Ōyabu	February 2, 2022
Asked by Mai-Mai to deliver a letter to one Caerick, who works at the influential merchant company Sakaiya, Cayna discovers that the person in question is her grandson; she also meets his sister Caerina, her granddaughter and a member of Helshper's knight company. After a tense introduction – in which Cayna's annoyance at her offspring's reverence to her quickly gets the better of her – she begins looking for the next Guardian Tower. Two adventurers (and secretly, stranded Leadale gamers), Quolkeh and Exis, tell her of a place called Crescent Moon Castle, which is located deep within bandit territory. With some help from Caerick, Cayna uses the guise of transporting supplies to Caerina's garrison for her plan to infiltrate the bandit lands. Before she can continue, a band of rock golems attacks the fortress, and despite her misgivings about standing out again, Cayna comes to the knights' aid.
6	"Rock Golems, a Chief, Skeletons, and Fairies"; Transliteration: "Rokku Gōremu to, Tōmoku to, Gaikotsu to, Yōsei" (Japanese: ロックゴーレムと、頭目と、ガイコツと、妖精)	Takeyuki Yanase	Kazuyuki Fudeyasu	Takeyuki Yanase	February 9, 2022
Cayna handily defeats the attacking golems with her magic, and given their power levels, she assumes that their summoner must be another player stuck within the game like herself. Arriving near the Crescent Moon Castle, she overwhelms a gang of bandits and their demon boss, who is indeed another Leadale player using the absence of the game administrators to wreak havoc at his whim. Despite Cayna's objections, the bandit leader is detained by the Helshper knights for trial after she restrains his abilities. Making her way into the castle, she revives its skeletal guardian and learns from it that this Guardian Tower belonged to Opus, a fellow Skill Master and her former mentor to the game. The guardian also presents Cayna with the Tower's Guardian Ring and a fairy familiar left to her by Opus. She also receives a huge monetary reward from her grandchildren for clearing the bandit threat before returning to Felskeilo.
7	"Bear Hunting, a Queen, a Bath, and Monsters" (Note: The official English localization contains a mistranslation: The kanji "王女" in the Japanese titulation stands for "princess", while "queen" uses kanji "女王 ". Additionally, Myleene, the character in question, occupies the rank of a princess, not a queen.); Transliteration: "Kumagari to, Ōjo to, Ofuro to, Kaijū" (Japanese: 熊狩りと、王女と、お風呂と、怪獣)	Hiromichi Matano	Kazuyuki Fudeyasu	Kyōhei Ōyabu	February 16, 2022
On her way back, Cayna encounters Kartatz, who was in the area repairing a bridge, and they return to the Felskeilo capital together. She takes up an adventuring quest to hunt horned bear meat for a high-class restaurant, but gets unexpected company from Lonti and a friend of hers called Mye, who ask to accompany her. Quickly guessing that Mye is really Primo's sister, Cayna gives her permission. In the forest, she awes the two girls with her magical powers, including constructing a hot bath out of nothing. The next day, at the Adventurers' Guild, the leader of the Felskeilo Knight Corps, Shining Saber, encounters an adventurer named Cohral, and both recognize each other as fellow players from Earth who got stuck in the world of Leadale for years. At the Royal Academy, Lopus Harvey unsuccessfully tries to recreate Cayna's method of potion-making but ultimately fails. When he dumps the failed concoction into a refuse pit, somehow a gargantuan monster – an Event Monster from the game – is called into being and embarks on a rampage.
8	"A Battle, a Victory, a Conversation, and Information"; Transliteration: "Sentō to, Shōri to, Kaiwa to, Jōhō" (Japanese: 戦闘と、勝利と、会話と、情報)	Naoyoshi Kusaka	Kazuyuki Fudeyasu	Kumiko Habara	February 23, 2022
Felskeilo's defenders mobilize against the monster, but it proves too powerful for them until Cayna returns and easily vanquishes it. As the cause is assessed in the aftermath, Cohral and Shining Saber recognize Cayna as a fellow player and ask her to meet them in the colosseum. After revealing their true natures as Leadale players to each other, they begin exchanging news and establishing a contact link. For receiving a powerful new sword and a useful ability from Cayna, Cohral points out the possible location of another Guardian Tower near a coastal fishing village. Afterwards, Cayna decides to permanently settle down in the village where she arrived in Leadale.
9	"Another Visit, a Mermaid, a Misunderstanding, and Zombies"; Transliteration: "Saihō to, Ningyo to, Gokai to, Zonbi" (Japanese: 再訪と、人魚と、誤解と、ゾンビ)	Tomihiko Ōkubo	Kazuyuki Fudeyasu	Tomihiko Ōkubo	March 2, 2022
Cayna is enthusiastically welcomed back in the village. The next morning, she descends into the village well to investigate a strange singing emanating from it, and thus discovers and rescues Mimily, a mermaid who was stranded in an underwater cave by a freak magical portal. After erecting a bathhouse to shelter her, Cayna returns to Felskelio's capital to join an expedition by the Felskelio knights against the bandit threat to get to the coastal village Cohral mentioned. When Shining Saber, who is leading the campaign, performs an act of gallantry for Cayna, the assembled knights erroneously begin to believe that the two are lovers. After a few days, she parts ways with the knights and heads for the village, only to discover it shrouded by a life-draining fog and crawling with zombies.
10	"A Butler, a Ghost Ship, a Ward, and the Palace of the Dragon King"; Transliteration: "Shitsuji to, Yūreisen to, Yōshi to, Ryūgūjō" (Japanese: 執事と、幽霊船と、養子と、竜宮城)	Masakazu Takahashi	Kazuyuki Fudeyasu	Kunihisa Sugishima	March 9, 2022
While investigating the zombie village, Cayna encounters Quolkeh and Exis, who have come here on an assignment of their own, and a young girl named Luka, the only survivor of her community. After determining that the death fog must be a quest event from the game, Cayna summons a werecat NPC butler named Roxilius to look after Luka before she, Exis and Quolkeh set out to defeat the boss monster responsible for this. With the threat eliminated, Cayna journeys to the Guardian Tower she was looking for, the Palace of the Dragon King, whose guardian accepts her as its new master. After adopting Luka as a new daughter, Cayna takes the girl and Roxilius with her.
11	"An Introduction, a Carriage, a Maid, and Moving"; Transliteration: "Shōkai to, Basha to, Meido to, Hikkoshi" (Japanese: 紹介と、馬車と、メイドと、引っ越し)	Naoyoshi Kusaka	Kazuyuki Fudeyasu	Yōko Hagiwara	March 16, 2022
Cayna brings Luka to Felskeilo to introduce her to her step-siblings and friends. She also receives a wagon from Elineh as a gift for her past assistance, and to have more help in her expanded household, she summons her werecat maid Roxine. After converting the wagon into a self-propelled golem, Cayna and her entourage set out for the remote village, where she introduces Luka to the locals, who promptly prepare a welcome party for her.
12	"Relocating, Building, Flying, and the Earth"; Transliteration: "Ijū to, Kenchiku to, Hikō to, Daichi" (Japanese: 移住と、建築と、飛行と、大地)	Takeyuki Yanase	Kazuyuki Fudeyasu	Takeyuki Yanase	March 23, 2022
The day after the party, the villagers grant Cayna a small plot of land on which she builds her new house with her magic. After she, Luka, Roxilius and Roxine have (more or less) settled in, Cayna fulfills a promise to Lytt and takes her and Luka on a flying tour across the land.
