= Mäo =

Mäo may refer to several places in Estonia:

- Mäo, Järva County, village in Paide, Järva County
- Mäo, Lääne-Viru County, village in Kadrina Parish, Lääne-Viru County
