= Sabikui Bisco =

Japanese light novel series and its franchise

- First light novel volume cover, featuring Bisco Akaboshi

錆喰いビスコ
- Genre: Adventure; Post-apocalyptic
- Light novel
- Written by: Shinji Cobkubo
- Illustrated by: K Akagishi; mocha
- Published by: ASCII Media Works
- English publisher: NA: Yen Press
- Imprint: Dengeki Bunko
- Original run: March 10, 2018 – January 10, 2025
- Volumes: 10
- Manga

Part 1
- Written by: Shinji Cobkubo
- Illustrated by: Yūsuke Takahashi
- Published by: Square Enix
- English publisher: NA: Comikey
- Magazine: Manga UP!
- Original run: April 10, 2019 – March 2, 2021
- Volumes: 4
- Manga

Part 2
- Written by: Shinji Cobkubo
- Illustrated by: Sō Natsuki
- Published by: Square Enix
- English publisher: NA: Comikey
- Magazine: Manga UP!
- Original run: December 15, 2021 – October 28, 2022
- Volumes: 3
- Anime television series
- Directed by: Atsushi Itagaki
- Written by: Sadayuki Murai
- Music by: Takeshi Ueda; Hinako Tsubakiyama
- Studio: OZ
- Licensed by: Crunchyroll (streaming); SA/SEA: Muse Communication
- Original network: Tokyo MX, BS11, ytv
- English network: SEA: Animax Asia
- Original run: January 11, 2022 – present
- Episodes: 12
- icon

Sabikui Bisco (Japanese: 錆喰いビスコ), also known as Rust-Eater Bisco, is a Japanese light novel series written by Shinji Cobkubo and illustrated by K Akagishi, with world-building art by mocha. ASCII Media Works have released ten volumes since March 2018 under their Dengeki Bunko label. The light novel is licensed in North America by Yen Press. A manga adaptation with art by Rokudo Takahashi was serialized online between April 2019 and March 2021 via Square Enix's online manga magazine Manga UP!. It was collected in four tankōbon volumes. The second part of the manga with art by Sō Natsuki was serialized in the same magazine between December 2021 and October 2022 and has been collected in two tankōbon volumes. An anime television series adaptation produced by OZ aired from January to March 2022. A second season has been announced.

== Plot ==
Set in post-apocalyptic Japan, the land is ravaged by rust, a deadly plague-like wind which affects everything it touches, including humans. It is believed to originate from mushroom spores and so Bisco Akaboshi, a Mushroom Keeper and archer whose arrows instantly grow mushrooms wherever they land, is a wanted criminal. He and his giant crab Akutagawa team up with the young doctor Milo Nekoyanagi to search the wastelands for the legendary "Sabikui", a mushroom said to devour all forms of rust.

== Characters ==
Bisco Akaboshi (赤星 ビスコ, Akaboshi Bisuko)
Voiced by: Ryōta Suzuki (Japanese); Kyle Igneczi (English)
A 17-year-old Mushroom Keeper with the nickname of "Man-Eating Mushroom" who is regarded as a terrorist and has a price on his head. He commands the giant crab Actagawa (アクタガワ), which he regards as his brother, that is also used for transport. His primary weapon, common to all Mushroom Keepers, is a bow with arrows coated in special spores that causes a variety of giant mushrooms to instantly grow wherever the arrowheads pierce.
Milo Nekoyanagi (猫柳 ミロ, Nekoyanagi Miro)
Voiced by: Natsuki Hanae (Japanese); Brandon McInnis (English)
A young doctor with outstanding medical skills who runs the Panda Clinic. He has pale blue hair and is nicknamed "Panda" because of his pale skin and the dark spot over his left eye socket. To compensate for his amateur archery skills and lower physical prowess compared to Bisco, Milo modifies his arrows with various explosives and chemical agents.
Pawoo Nekoyanagi (猫柳 パウー, Nekoyanagi Paū)
Voiced by: Reina Kondō (Japanese); Anastasia Muñoz (English)
Milo Nekoyanagi's older sister who is stricken with the Rust disease. She is Captain of the Imihama Watch, which defends society from "mushroom terrorists". Her weapon of choice is a heavy metal rod and, despite the advanced state of her affliction, she possesses incredible strength and agility. According to Milo Nekoyanagi, she has an E-cup. She eventually falls in love with Bisco.
Jabi (ジャビ)
Voiced by: Shirō Saitō (Japanese); David Novinski (English)
An old Mushroom Keeper who is Bisco's mentor and father figure. He is stricken by a severe case of Rust disease, which has given him a month at best to live.
Kurokawa (黒革)
Voiced by: Kenjiro Tsuda (Japanese); Josh Putnam (English)
Chief of the Vigilantism and later Governor of Imihama Prefecture. He rules the region with a mafia-like iron fist, employing bunny-masked enforcers to carry out his will. His weapon of choice is a revolver that fires rusty bullets that infect targets with the Rust disease.
Tirol Ōchagama (大茶釜 チロル, Ōchagama Chiroru)
Voiced by: Miyu Tomita (Japanese); Brittney Karbowski (English)
A young female mercenary with long plaited pink hair which prompts Bisco to nickname her "Jellyfish". She used to work as a mechanic on a Tetsujin project years ago, but fled when all of her co-workers succumbed to the Rust disease. She was initially employed by Kurokawa, but also has a side-job as a traveling merchant, selling various odds and ends such as weapon blueprints and snacks.

== Media ==
=== Light novels ===
The series ended with its tenth volume.

No.	Original release date	Original ISBN	English release date	English ISBN
1	March 10, 2018	978-4-04-893616-3	January 18, 2022	978-1-9753-3681-3
2	August 10, 2018	978-4-04-893832-7	May 3, 2022	978-1-9753-3683-7
3	January 10, 2019	978-4-04-912162-9	August 23, 2022	978-1-9753-3685-1
4	July 10, 2019	978-4-04-912478-1	January 17, 2023	978-1-9753-3687-5
5	December 10, 2019	978-4-04-912733-1	July 18, 2023	978-1-9753-3689-9
6	June 10, 2020	978-4-04-913186-4	November 21, 2023	978-1-9753-3691-2
7	March 10, 2021	978-4-04-913267-0	April 16, 2024	978-1-9753-6792-3
8	January 8, 2022	978-4-04-914036-1	August 20, 2024	978-1-9753-6794-7
9	August 10, 2023	978-4-04-914037-8	January 21, 2025	978-1-9753-9892-7
10	January 10, 2025	978-4-04-915069-8	February 10, 2026	979-8-8554-2428-7

=== Manga ===
A manga adaptation with art by Yūsuke Takahashi was serialized online between April 10, 2019, and March 2, 2021, via Square Enix's online manga magazine Manga UP!. It was collected in four tankōbon volumes. The second part of the manga with art by Sō Natsuki was serialized in the same magazine between December 15, 2021, and October 28, 2022, and has been collected in three tankōbon volumes. Both parts are licensed digitally in North America by Comikey.

==== First part ====
No.	Release date	ISBN
1	December 10, 2019	978-4-75-756411-4
2	June 10, 2020	978-4-75-756725-2
3	March 10, 2021	978-4-75-757137-2
4	March 10, 2021	978-4-75-757138-9

==== Second part ====
No.	Release date	ISBN
1	February 7, 2022	978-4-75-757736-7
2	July 7, 2022	978-4-75-758005-3
3	December 7, 2022	978-4-75-758286-6

=== Anime ===
During the "Kadokawa Light Novel Expo 2020" event on March 6, 2021, it was announced that the series would be receiving an anime television series adaptation by OZ. Atsushi Itagaki is directing the series, with Sadayuki Murai writing the series' scripts, Ai Asari and Ikariya designing the characters, and Takeshi Ueda and Hinako Tsubakiyama composing the series' music. It aired from January 11 to March 29, 2022, on Tokyo MX and other channels. (Note: Tokyo MX and BS11 list the series premiere at 24:30 on January 10, 2022, which is effectively 12:30 a.m. JST on January 11.) The opening theme song is "Kaze no Oto Sae Kikoenai" (Even the Wind is Silent) by JUNNA, while the ending theme song is "Hōkō" (Howl) by Ryōta Suzuki and Natsuki Hanae as their respective characters. Both Crunchyroll and Funimation streamed the series outside of Asia. Muse Communication licensed the series in South and Southeast Asia; available to watch on iQiyi and also Muse Asia YouTube Channel. This series aired on Animax across Southeast Asia starting May 17, 2022.

The anime was released on DVD and Blu-ray in Japan across 3 volumes, each volume containing 4 episodes. The first volume was released on March 23, 2022, and the last volume was released on May 25, 2022. Crunchyroll released the series on Blu-ray in North America on January 3, 2023.

A second season was announced at the Dengeki Bunko 30th anniversary event on July 16, 2023.

==== Episode list ====
No.	Title	Directed by	Written by	Storyboarded by	Original release date
1	"The Man Worth 800,000"; Transliteration: "Hachijūman Nikka no Otoko" (Japanese: 八十万日貨の男)	Atsushi Itagaki	Sadayuki Murai	Atsushi Itagaki	January 11, 2022
A man arrives at the Gunma-Imihama Prefectures border outpost with his face covered with bandages and a heavily loaded covered wagon. He claims to be a monk, but his travel documents cannot be read by the scanner. He says that he is heading to Imihama on a pilgrimage and bury his wagon-load of bodies, but the guard is suspicious of his identity. Criminals from Gunma Prefecture try to cross the border and cross the Rust dessert to get to Imihama and the guard points to a poster offering an 800,000 reward for Akaboshi (Man-Eater) Bisco. Meanwhile in the city of Imihama, mild-mannered doctor Milo Nekoyanagi uses his talents to help the poorer residents and cuts deals with the governor to acquire medical equipment for his research into the Rusting disease. He secretly buys mushrooms on the black market to help further his research into a cure for the disease and save his infected older sister Pawoo who is also the Captain of the Imihama Watch. Suddenly, the center of Imihama is attacked by Man–Eater Bisco and then he turns up at Milo's clinic.
2	"Soar on King Trumpets"; Transliteration: "Eringi de Tobu" (Japanese: エリンギで跳ぶ)	Atsushi Itagaki	Sadayuki Murai	Atsushi Itagaki	January 18, 2022
The monk at the border is revealed to be Rust–Eater Bisco. He fires an arrow into the ground which sprouts a giant mushroom enabling him, his giant crab Actagawa and his partner Jabi who were hiding in the wagon, to be lifted over the border. Jabi is dying from Rusting and Bisco plans to take him to Imihama, hoping that doctor Milo can cure him. In Imihama, Bisco gives Milo a "lurkershroom" mushroom to help cure Jabi, but they are interrupted by Kurokawa's elite forces wearing bunny masks who open fire on the clinic. Bisco fires his arrows which create giant mushrooms enabling them to flee. Kurokawa berates the mercenary Oochagama Tirol for allowing them to escape. Milo's sister Pawoo dons her uniform as of Captain of the Imihama Watch and goes into action on her motorcycle to apprehend the wanted villain, Akaboshi Bisco. Bisco evades Kurokawa's forces, and captures one of the Bunny Masks who turns out to be Oochagama Tirol. However, before he can question her, he is confronted by Captain Pawoo.
3	"Tag Team"; Transliteration: "Taggu" (Japanese: タッグ)	Katsuya Kikuchi	Sadayuki Murai	Atsushi Itagaki	January 25, 2022
While Milo gives Jabi a blood transfusion to help heal him, Captain Pawoo attacks Bisco. Bisco tries to explain that mushrooms consume Rust rather than spread it which is why they are often seen at concentrations of Rust, and that he is looking for the legendary Rust-Eater mushroom. Jabi explains to Milo that the Rust-Eater mushroom is rumored to be near a nest of monsters at a place called Weeping Child Ravine in Akita Prefecture. Bisco subdues Pawoo with a drugged arrow and reunites with Milo and Jabi. Milo injects Pawoo with the serum he made from Bisco's mushroom and then offers to join Bisco to seek the Rust-Eater mushroom while Jabi recovers. Bisco reluctantly agrees as traveling Mushroom Keepers operate in pairs like a tag team and they head for the North Gate. Bisco fires an arrow into the ground, causing a giant mushroom to sprout beneath them which catapults them over the wall.
4	"Ride the Crab"; Transliteration: "Kani ni Noru" (Japanese: 蟹に乗る)	Daisuke Mataga	Yutaka Yasunaga	Daisuke Mataga	February 1, 2022
After escaping Imihama together, Milo and Bisco trudge out into the desert in search of the Rust-Eater mushroom, hoping to find it before Pawoo and Jabi succumb to the Rusting disease. Eventually they come across Bisco's crab Actagawa, which hid during the events in Imihama. Milo struggles to ride the giant crab, but he finally manages to control it. Later, the pair stop by an old abandoned gun emplacement at Nikko Senjogahara to rest and inside they find Tirol struggling to breathe. Milo quickly saves her from a "balloonworm" that Kurokawa secretly planted inside her which expands without regular doses of an inhibitor. Tirol repays the favor by trying to sell them some of her goods, but they only buy a box of biscuits. Tirol dumps out a jug of expired coal-based fuel that activates the facility which is built on top of a giant mantis shrimp. With Bisco's help, Milo is able to direct Actagawa and stop the shrimp's rampage, however it fires off one last cannon shell that blows up the mine entrance Bisco hoped to use to pass through the Ashio Bonecoal Mountains to Niigata. Bisco and Milo take an alternative route across the Calvero Shellsand Sea wasteland and arrive at a ruined city. When Bisco grabs a boy carrying a watermelon, they come under fire from armed children.
5	"Children's Fortress"; Transliteration: "Kodomo-tachi no Toride" (Japanese: こどもたちの砦)	Takahiro Ono; Takayuki Kuriyama	Yutaka Yasunaga	Atsushi Itagaki	February 8, 2022
The armed children of Tetsujin (Note: Tetsujin (鉄人) is a Japanese word meaning "iron man".) Town demand that Bisco releases the boy but Bisco reveals that he is the wanted criminal Akaboshi and surrenders himself. Later, a child explains to Milo that schools of giant blowfish rise up in winter and threaten the town, and that the adults have left to work for Kurokawa in Imihama to earn enough money to cure the Rust which he said was infecting the children. However, Milo explains that the children suffer from Shellskin and he provides a cure which the children can then easily manufacture themselves. When an unseasonal school of giant floating blowfish approaches the Town, Bisco easily frees himself and successfully shoots down the blowfish with his arrows which burst into huge mushrooms on impact. Meanwhile, in an abandoned city Pawoo saves an old couple who are being menaced by a giant spider. However, Pawoo discovers that the ghoulish couple have been killing off the other inhabitants and travellers and plan the same fate for her. She attempts to apprehend them but they set off a massive explosion during which she escapes. Back in Imihama, Kurokawa exposes Jabi who has been pretending to be a member of his Bunny Masks enforcers.
6	"Companions and Prey"; Transliteration: "Michizure to Emono" (Japanese: 道連れと獲物)	Takayuki Kuriyama	Shigeru Murakoshi	Katsuya Kikuchi	February 15, 2022
Bisco and Milo trudge through a snowy wasteland when they stumble onto Tirol, nearly frozen to death. Milo saves her life again and the three continue their way aboard Actagawa. Tirol repays the favor by helping Milo barter with some Shimobuki traders who speak a different dialect. They arrive at the frozen entrance to Kitsunezaka Station which Actagawa breaks open. Milo, Bisco, Tirol and Actagawa follow an old subway tunnel, and find an automatic railcar, but it is activated by Yen coins which no longer exist. That evening, while flipping through the Field Guide to Life in Konakidani guidebook written by a Mushroom Keeper that they acquired from the traders, Milo finds information about the Rust-Eater mushroom, found on a giant flying pipe-snake. Using her mechanical skills, Tirol manages to hotwire the railcar, so Milo and Bisco part company, leaving Tirol as friends after finally exchanging names. The railcar runs into a pack of oil slimes, but Milo is able to destroy the parent octopus-like slime with Actagawa's help. Milo and Bisco emerge from the tunnel and arrive at the edge of a valley where the Rust-Eater mushrooms once grew. They see the giant flying snake, but have no idea how to bring it down. As Bisco tries to work out a plan, Pawoo speeds towards him on her motorcycle, seeking revenge for taking Milo.
7	"The Stolen Rust Eater"; Transliteration: "Ubawareta Sabikui" (Japanese: 奪われた錆喰い)	Takehiro Kubota; Takahiro Ono	Shigeru Murakoshi	Atsushi Itagaki	February 22, 2022
As Pawoo attempts to seize Bisco, the giant flying snake re-emerges form the valley and grab hers with the finger-like appendages along its side. Milo has Actagawa jump onto its back and wound it with its claw, forcing the snake releases Pawoo but it grabs Actagawa's claw with its long tongue. In desperation, Milo severs Actagawa's claw but the double-headed snake swallows both him and Bisco who tries to save him. Bisco manages to kill the snake from the inside with his mushroom-creating arrows. Bisco then tastes one of the matsutake mushroom attached to the body of the snake and declares that it is not the "Rust-Eater", but Milo discovers that it reacts on contact with Bisco's Mushroom Keeper blood enabling him to make a Rust-neutralizing serum. Kurokawa arrives overhead in an airborne vehicle to take the giant "Rust-Eater" snake's body, and he shoots Bisco with a "Rust bullet" before departing with the snake. Pawoo has a change of heart about Bisco, even calling him "cute" before she leaves for Imihama with some of Milo's anti-Rust serum to cure Jabi. However, when she arrives back to Shimobuki Base she finds her men gone and Kurokawa holding Jabi. Bisco tries to follow her but he is too weak from his wounds so Milo injects him with some serum and prepares to save Pawoo and Jabi himself.
8	"Fiendish Trap"; Transliteration: "Gedō no Wana" (Japanese: 外道の罠)	Daisuke Mataga	Yutaka Yasunaga	Daisuke Mataga	March 1, 2022
Kurokawa holds Pawoo prisoner at Shimobuki Base and broadcasts a video message on an open channel that he will kill her unless Milo delivers both Bisco and the anti-Rust serum to him. Milo arrives at Shimobuki and attacks Kurokawa with a knife coated with mushroom poison, however Kurokawa is prepared and reveals that he was a former Mushroom Keeper with a strong knowledge of mushrooms and shoots Milo with an arrow coated in Puppetshroom to control his movements. He demands that Milo reveal the secret of the Rust-Eater but Bisco suddenly arrives and attacks Kurokawa wounding him. Kurokawa forces Milo to shoot Puppetshroom arrows into Bisco to immobilize him and then forces Milo to reveal the secret of the serum. Meanwhile, Jabi has escaped from his cell, freed Pawoo and shoots an arrow through Kurokawa's eye. The trio escapes, but are pursued by Kurokawa's men, so Jabi fights a rearguard action. Kurokawa's enforcers pursue Milo and Bisco and shoot them with arrows, but Actagawa emerges from the snow and saves them.
9	"I Love You"; Transliteration: "Kimi o Ai Shiteru" (Japanese: きみを愛してる)	Yūki Nagasawa; Mika Takahata	Shigeru Murakoshi	Atsushi Itagaki; Katsuya Kikuchi	March 8, 2022
Milo has a dream about his comrades and wakes up to find out that he is blind and fatally infected with Rust. Bisco calms him down and injects him with the Rust-eating medicine that Pawoo gave him earlier, then heads out to tackle Kurokawa. Meanwhile at the Japanese government forces Miyagi Base, Kurokawa tells Jabi that he has ample supply of anti-Rust treatments from persecuting Mushroom Keepers. He explains that the original Rust wind has been mostly harmless for a long time, and so to increase demand he and the Japanese government is producing artificial Rust wind using the last functional Tetsujin and its internal Rust reactor. Kurokawa explains that he will use the Elephant-like Ganesha Cannon to fire concentrated Rust bullets, first at Weeping Child Ravine to destroy the Rust-Eater source and maintain his monopoly. He tries to pressure Jabi into recruiting Mushroom Keepers to use their blood for the Rust-Eater medicine, but Jabi refuses. Kurokawa threatens to cut off Jabi's fingers, but Bisco, disguised in a bunny mask, severs the chains instead of Jabi's fingers and stabs Kurokawa in the foot. Bisco asks Jabi to destroy Kurokawa's Ganesha Cannon while he deals with Kurokawa. During the fight with Kurokawa, Bisco is shot in the eye with a Rust bullet and loses his fingers and forearm to Rust, but he grabs Kurokawa and leaps into the vat of liquid Rust with him. Milo arrives just as Kurokawa dies, but before Bisco is also consumed by the Rust lava he asks Milo to take his life. Milo cries as he shoots Bisco with an arrow and screams, "I love you."
10	"Tetsujin Revived"; Transliteration: "Fukkatsu no Tetsujin" (Japanese: 復活のテツジン)	Takahiro Ono; Atsushi Itagaki	Yutaka Yasunaga	Atsushi Itagaki	March 15, 2022
Acting on Kurokawa's original instructions, the Ganesha Cannon is filled with liquid Rust and is prepared for firing, but the combined efforts of Jabi and Pawoo manage to topple it so that it explodes, also causing the facility to collapse. They are reunited with Milo who informs them that Bisco has died but lives on in his heart. Suddenly the Tetsujin rises from the wreckage, its skeletal metal components filled in with a mass of Rust. The Tetsujin then fires a blast at and destroys Weeping Child Ravine, then blasts concentrated Rust on the government forces. It begins walking off into the distance, leaving a trail of Rust contaminated ground. Milo decides to follow it while Jabi and Pawoo prepare to follow on Actagawa. Meanwhile, the surviving forces return to Shimobuki Base where Tirol overhears them talking about the incident at Miyagi Base. The Tetsujin strides into view, and following an attack by the government forces, it once again breathes Rust and instantly converts the forces into Rust statues, repeating the word "Akaboshi". Milo catches up with the Tetsujin which he believes is a transformed Kurokawa and fires mushroom-producing arrows into its body. Jabi arrives on Actagawa and fires more arrows, but the monster manages to shed the mushrooms and then sets off a massive explosion.
11	"I'm Bisco!"; Transliteration: "Ore ga Bisuko da!" (Japanese: おれがビスコだ！)	Takayuki Kuriyama	Sadayuki Murai	Ei Aoki	March 22, 2022
Jabi and Milo are still alive thanks to Actagawa who protected them from the explosion, but Jabi is wounded. While resting, Jabi wonders at the nature of the Rust, which devours all things, as something intended to be God-like. Jabi also muses on Rust's relation to mushrooms, which have evolved due to the presence of Rust in the first place. Milo leaves Jabi, who scolds Milo for his use of a dangerous mushroom drug that improves his physical capabilities, in the care of the local Shimobuki and heads off on Actagawa towards Imihama in pursuit of the Tetsujin. Meanwhile, the monster approaches Tetsujin Town, and the children decide to abandon their home and run for their lives. Just as it begins to destroy the town, Milo arrives and again begins firing arrows into the Tetsujin, which slows it until the Imihama Watch arrives and begins an attack, firing rounds from tanks on the ground and missiles from aircraft. Tirol arrives in a vehicle with Pawoo and Jabi and they join Milo who continues to shoot mushroom producing arrows, but nothing seems to slow the monster. A huge fan appears in its chest which begins to spread a Rust storm enveloping everything in its path. In desperation, Milo injects himself with Bishamon mushroom poison to enhance his powers, and attacks the Tetsujin himself, managing to land on its body and begin cutting it open. The monster casts Milo aside, but not before Bisco begins to emerge from within its body. Bisco thanks Milo whose voice he heard while he balanced on the precipice of the next world and prepares to challenge the Kurokawa Tetsujin.
12	"Bow and Arrow Duo"; Transliteration: "Yumiya no Futari" (Japanese: 弓矢の二人)	Atsushi Itagaki; Mika Takahata	Sadayuki Murai	Atsushi Itagaki	March 29, 2022
Milo and Bisco are happily reunited, although Bisco has transformed, with a glowing right arm and his body is exuding spores causing Milo to surmise that Bisco is half-human and half-Rust-Eater. Bisco attacks the Kurokawa Tetsujin but it recovers after each attack and Tirol deduces that the Tetsujin's "pilot" resides within the iron mask and that should be the focus of their attack. Pawoo volunteers to split the mask, and after Bisco agrees that she can have anything she wants on her return, she suddenly grabs and kisses him. Jabi launches Pawoo toward the Tetsujin's head, where she strikes it with her steel pole to split the Tetsujin's mask without detonating it. The mask falls away revealing Kurokawa imbedded within the head, but he continues to attack and momentarily blinds Bisco with concentrated Rust. Encouraged by Milo, Bisco fires an arrow, killing Kurokawa, and preventing the Tetsujin's self-destruct. A tidal wave of Rust-Eater mushrooms bloom and destroy the Tetsujin and all the Rust nearby, including the infection inside Pawoo. Eventually, the huge quantity of Rust-Eater mushrooms provide a limitless cure for the Imihama population. Pawoo becomes the new governor of Imihama, and declares independence from the Japanese government while decrying its persecution of Mushroom Keepers. Some time later, a disguised Bisco and Milo leave through the Gunma-Imihama border outpost and give the official and his assistant vials of the Rust-Eater injection as reward for caring for the mushroom left behind. The duo head off into the distance, intending to find a way to undo the Rust-Eater transformation, as Bisco does not wish to live forever (and because he keeps growing mushrooms on his body).

== Reception ==
In 2019, the light novel ranked first in the overall ranking and in the new work ranking in Takarajimasha's annual light novel guide book Kono Light Novel ga Sugoi!, in the bunkobon category, becoming the first series to do this. As of October 2021 the series has over 300,000 copies in circulation.

== See also ==
- Campfire Cooking in Another World with My Absurd Skill—A light novel series whose manga adaptation is also illustrated by K Akagishi
