= Mao (given name) =

- Gender: unisex

Origin
- Origin: Japanese
- Meaning: Different meanings depending on the kanji used

Mao (written: 真央, 真緒, 真桜, 麻央, 麻緒, 万桜 or 真大) is a unisex Japanese given name. People with the name include:

- Mao (Japanese singer)
- Mao (Italian singer)
- Mao Abe (阿部 真央; born 1990), Japanese singer-songwriter
- Mao Arai (新井 万央; born 2003), Japanese judoka
- Mao Asada (浅田 真央; born 1990), Japanese figure skater
- Mao Daichi (大地 真央; born 1956), Japanese actress
- Mao Denda (傳田 真央; born 1980), Japanese singer-songwriter
- Mao Fujita (藤田 真央; born 1998), Japanese male pianist
- Mao Hamasaki (浜崎真緒; born 1993), former Japanese adult actress and discjockey
- Mao Hosoya (細谷 真大; born 2001), Japanese male footballer
- Mao Ichimichi (市道 真央; born 1992), Japanese actress and voice actress
- Mao Ichiyama (一山 麻緒; born 1997), Japanese long-distance runner
- Mao Inoue (井上 真央; born 1987), Japanese actress
- Mao Ishigaki (石垣 真央; born 1991), Japanese curler
- Mao Ishikawa (石川 真生; born 1953), Okinawan photographer and activist
- Mao Izumi (泉 真生; born 1996), Japanese judoka
- Mao Kiyota (清田 真央; 1993), Japanese long distance runner
- Mao Kobayashi (actress) (小林 麻央; 1982 – 2017), Japanese actress
- Mao Kobayashi (Japanese idol) (小林 万桜; born 1992), Japanese junior idol
- Mao Kunii (born 1996), Japanese rhythmic gymnast
- Mao Kurata (倉多まお; born 1994), Japanese adult actress
- Mao Miyaji (宮地 真緒; born 1984), Japanese actress
- Mao Murakami (村上 真魚; born 1995), Japanese J-pop dancer
- Mao Saigo (西郷 真央; born 2001), Japanese professional golfer
- Mao Shimada (島田 麻央; born 2008), Japanese figure skater

== Other people ==
- Mao Zeming (b. 1963), Papua New Guinean politician

== Fictional characters ==
- Mao (マオ), a Geass-user in the anime series Code Geass: Lelouch of the Rebellion
- Mao Chen, a character in the anime series Beyblade
- Mao Jahana (謝花 真央), a female character in the anime series Blood+
- Mao (猫（マオ）), a character in the anime and manga series Darker than Black
- Mao (マオ), a character in the video game Shadow Hearts: From The New World
- Mao (マオ), a character in the video game Tales of Rebirth
- Mao (マオ), the main character in the video game Disgaea 3
- Mao (マオ), a character in the video game Shining Wind
- Mao, a character in the film Marock, played by Assaad Bouab
- Mao Mao, a character in the video game Aero Fighters
- Sadao Mao (真奥 貞夫), aka Satan, the main protagonist of the anime The Devil Is a Part-Timer!
- Mao Nonosaka (野々坂 まお), a secondary character of the anime "The Future Diary" or also known as "Mirai Nikki".
- Mao Kamitsuki, a character from the fictional idol group Apricot Regulus
- Mao Onigawara, a character in the anime series Ground Defense Force! Mao-chan
- Mao Otoha (音羽 舞桜, Otoha Mao), the main character from the Data Carddass arcade collectable card game and Anime/Tokusatsu, Aikatsu Planet!
- Mao Isara, a male character from the rhythm game Ensemble Stars!
- Mao Arimura (有村 麻央), a character in the game Gakuen Idolmaster
