= Shinta =

- Gender: Male (Japan), female (Indonesia)

Origin
- Origin: Japanese
- Meaning: Different meanings depending on the kanji used

Shinta (written: 真太 or 新太) is a masculine Japanese given name. In Indonesia, it is a female name. Notable people with the name include:

- Shinta Appelkamp (アペルカンプ 真大 カール) (born 2000), German footballer
- Shinta Bachir (born 1986), Indonesian actress, model and singer
- Shinta Chō (長 新太) (1927–2005), Japanese author and illustrator
- Shinta Fukushima (福島 新太) (born 1989), Japanese footballer
- Shinta Naomi JKT48, (born 1994), Indonesian singer, dancer and actress
- Shinta Nojiri (野尻 真太) (born 1971), Japanese video game designer
- Shinta Mulia Sari (born 1988), Indonesian-Singaporean badminton player

== Fictional characters ==
- Himura Kenshin, known in childhood as "Shinta"

== Other meanings ==
- the name for Sita in Indonesian languages.
