= The Devil Is a Part-Timer! =

Japanese light novel series and its franchise

- First light novel volume cover, featuring (from left to right) Shiro, Sadao, Chiho, and Emilia

はたらく魔王さま! (Hataraku Maō-sama!)
- Genre: Fantasy comedy; Reverse isekai
- Light novel
- Written by: Satoshi Wagahara
- Illustrated by: 029 (Oniku)
- Published by: ASCII Media Works
- English publisher: NA: Yen Press
- Imprint: Dengeki Bunko
- Original run: February 10, 2011 – August 7, 2020
- Volumes: 30 (Note: This includes 21 main novels, two prequel novels, one spin-off novel, and six bonus novels.)
- Manga
- Written by: Satoshi Wagahara
- Illustrated by: Akio Hiiragi
- Published by: ASCII Media Works
- English publisher: NA: Yen Press
- Imprint: Dengeki Comics
- Magazine: Dengeki Daioh
- Original run: December 27, 2011 – May 27, 2025
- Volumes: 24
- Manga

The Devil Is a Part-Timer! High School!
- Written by: Satoshi Wagahara
- Illustrated by: Kurone Mishima
- Published by: ASCII Media Works
- English publisher: NA: Yen Press
- Imprint: Dengeki Comics EX
- Magazine: Dengeki Maoh
- Original run: May 2012 – February 2015
- Volumes: 5
- Anime television series
- Directed by: Naoto Hosoda
- Produced by: Hitomi Araki; Jun Fukuda; Gaku Iwasa; Hiroshi Kawamura; Takema Okamura; Yasushi Ooshima; Shigeru Saitou
- Written by: Masahiro Yokotani
- Music by: Ryosuke Nakanishi
- Studio: White Fox
- Licensed by: Crunchyroll; SEA: Muse Communication
- Original network: Tokyo MX, KBS, SUN, BS Nittele, TVA, AT-X
- Original run: April 4, 2013 – June 27, 2013
- Episodes: 13
- Manga

Hataraku Maō-sama no Meshi!
- Written by: Satoshi Wagahara
- Illustrated by: Oji Sadō
- Published by: ASCII Media Works
- Imprint: Dengeki Comics Next
- Magazine: Comic Walker
- Original run: August 28, 2019 – November 4, 2022
- Volumes: 4
- Anime television series

The Devil Is a Part-Timer!!
- Directed by: Daisuke Tsukushi
- Produced by: Takema Okamura; Satoshi Fukao; Hirotaka Kaneko; Mitsuhiro Nanbara; Tomoyuki Oowada; Fumihiro Ozawa; Akihiro Sotokawa; Natsumi Tamura; Terushige Yoshie; Hitomi Araki (#1–12); Yasutaka Kurosaki (#13–)
- Written by: Masahiro Yokotani
- Music by: Ryosuke Nakanishi
- Studio: Studio 3Hz
- Licensed by: Crunchyroll; SEA: Muse Communication
- Original network: Tokyo MX, BS11, MBS, AT-X
- Original run: July 14, 2022 – September 28, 2023
- Episodes: 24
- icon

The Devil Is a Part-Timer! (Japanese: はたらく魔王さま!, Hepburn: Hataraku Maō-sama!; lit. 'Working Demon King!' or 'Demon Lord at Work!') is a Japanese light novel series written by Satoshi Wagahara, with illustrations by Oniku (written as 029). ASCII Media Works has published the series in Japan, while Yen Press has published it in North America.

The story follows Satan who, while attempting to conquer the world of Ente Isla, is confronted by the hero Emilia and forced to retreat through a gate that transports him to modern-day Tokyo, Japan. In order to survive and find a way to return to Ente Isla, Satan adopts the name Sadao Maou and starts working part-time at a fast food restaurant.

There have been two manga adaptations published by ASCII Media Works in Dengeki Daioh and Dengeki Maoh. A 13-episode anime adaptation produced by White Fox and directed by Naoto Hosoda aired from April to June 2013. A second season produced by 3Hz and directed by Daisuke Tsukushi aired from July to September 2022, with the second part of season 2 airing from July to September 2023. (Note: The second part is formally considered the "second season" of season 2 in Japan, as the actual second season is treated as a sequel series to the first in promotional material.)

== Plot ==
The Demon Lord Satan attempts to conquer the world of Ente Isla by annexing its four continents with the help of his demon generals: Alciel, Lucifer, Malacoda, and Adramelech. After the hero Emilia and her companions kill Malacoda and Adramelech and confront him, he and Alciel flee through a gate to modern-day Tokyo, Japan. However, because of Earth's lack of magic, they lose their powers and transform into humans. In order to survive until he can find a way to return to Ente Isla, Satan takes on the identity of Sadao Maou and begins working part-time at the fast food restaurant MgRonald's (a parody of McDonald's), with Alciel serving as housekeeper. One day, he meets a girl named Emi Yusa, who is actually Emilia. The story then unfolds, exploring the personalities of the characters and their moral values, as more characters from Ente Isla appear and also face the dilemmas of living in a new world, often comically.

== Characters ==
=== Main characters ===
Sadao Maou (真奥 貞夫, Maō Sadao) / Satan Jacob (サタン・ジャコブ, Satan Jakobu)
Voiced by: Shinobu Matsumoto (drama CD), Ryōta Ōsaka, Makoto Koichi (young) (anime) (Japanese); Jessie James Grelle (English)
The Demon Lord from Ente Isla. After fleeing from Emilia and her companions, he and Ashiya are transported to modern-day Japan and transform into human form. To survive, he adopts a Japanese name similar to his original name, Sadao Maou, and begins working part-time at a MgRonald's franchise, eventually being promoted to full-time position as an assistant shift manager. He and other demons can transform into their original forms when people around them are filled with despair. However, he uses his powers for good deeds such as repairing the city, which causes others to question his current personality. However, it is later revealed that he was always like this and was not the "Evil Overlord" that the people of Ente Isla had grown to fear and hate; in reality, he did "evil" things to help his people, the demons, and protect others. When he was younger, Emi's mother, Lailah, rescued him and taught him, giving him a fragment of Sephiroth that later becomes his and Emi's chosen daughter, Alas Ramus. He later fuses with Alas Ramus' "younger sister" Acieth Alla, another fragment of "Yesod", to rescue Emi and Ashiya after Olba and the Angels kidnap them.
Emi Yusa (遊佐 恵美, Yusa Emi) / Emilia Justina (エミリア・ユスティーナ, Emiria Yusutīna)
Voiced by: Yū Asakawa (drama CD), Yōko Hikasa (anime) (Japanese); Felecia Angelle (English)
The hero who confronts Satan, forcing him to retreat from Ente Isla, and follows him to Earth to ensure that he is destroyed. Like him, she loses most of her magical powers upon arriving on Earth and is forced to assume a Japanese name, Emi Yusa, and find employment as a call center agent. Her father was human and her mother was an archangel. When she was a child, Lucifer, one of Maou's generals, led an army of demons to attack her village, resulting in the death of her father, leading her to resent Maou and want to kill him. However, it is later revealed that her father is alive. Emi is later fired from her job at the call center and gets a new job at MgRonald's, where she works with Maou and Chiho. Despite her protests, Maou later appoints her Demon General of the Demon Army. Over time, she develops feelings for Maou, although she struggles to reconcile her feelings because of their past history and the fact that Chiho is also in love with him.
Chiho Sasaki (佐々木 千穂, Sasaki Chiho)
Voiced by: Nao Tōyama (Japanese); Tia Ballard, Jill Harris (ep. 32) (English)
A high school student who is Sadao's friend and co-worker at MgRonald's and develops feelings for him. She can hear and understand the language of Ente Isla because she was accidentally targeted by a communication spell intended for Emi, which was meant to target those who were constantly thinking about Sadao. She later learns how to use the spell Idea Link to warn others if she is in danger, and how to use magic to improve her archery skills. Maou later appoints her Demon General of the Demon Army, and she becomes well respected in the demon community. In order to obtain the Spear of Adramelechinus, which is needed to power the Demon's Castle and reach the Angels' stronghold on the moon, she becomes involved in the politics of Ente Isla. The light novel ends with her being together with Maou.
Shirō Ashiya (芦屋 四郎, Ashiya Shirō) / Alciel (アルシエル, Arushieru)
Voiced by: Takehito Koyasu (drama CD), Yūki Ono (anime) (Japanese); Anthony Bowling (English)
One of Satan's generals, who is transported to modern-day Japan with him. On Earth, Alciel assumes the identity of Shirō Ashiya and works as Sadao's housekeeper, taking care of domestic duties while researching ways to regain their powers. He is loyal to him, and when he fails in his duties, he is disappointed in himself for not doing a better job. He is also frugal in his spending habits. He has alluded to reciprocating Rika's love, though is currently unwilling to pursue a relationship with her due to believing that she fell in love with his human guise and not his "true self".
Hanzō Urushihara (漆原 半蔵, Urushihara Hanzō) / Lucifer (ルシフェル, Rushiferu)
Voiced by: Hiro Shimono (Japanese); Aaron Dismuke (English)
A fallen angel and one of Satan's generals. After Satan is transported to the human world, Lucifer and Olba make a deal to defeat him, with Olba promising to return Lucifer to heaven. After Sadao defeats them, Lucifer moves into his and Shirō's apartment. Having committed a series of robberies with Olba before his defeat, he must remain in seclusion to avoid the police. He is good with technology and loves to play video games, and is often referred to as a hikikomori or NEET, much to his irritation. His mother is the current leader of the Angels, Ignora, and his father was the ancient demon lord Sataniel.
Suzuno Kamazuki (鎌月 鈴乃, Kamazuki Suzuno) / Crestia Bell (クレスティア・ベル, Kuresutia Beru)
Voiced by: Kanae Itō (Japanese); Alex Moore (English)
Sadao's next-door neighbor, who is the grand inquisitor of the Church in Ente Isla and, like Emi, came to kill Sadao. She wields a giant mallet, which can be retracted into her flower-shaped hairpin. Unlike Emi, she has trouble adjusting to life on Earth and its technology. She briefly teams up with Sariel to eliminate Sadao and Emi after Sariel reminds her of her duties as grand inquisitor, but after seeing Sadao's concern for Chiho and realizing that she values her friendship with Emi and Chiho, she betrays Sariel and helps Chiho evacuate the area while Sadao and Sariel battle. Despite her protests, Maou later appoints her Demon General of the Demon Army, and over time she develops feelings for him, though she struggles to accept these feelings due to their past history. She is later promoted to Archbishop of the Church of Ente Isla.

=== Other characters ===
Rika Suzuki (鈴木 梨香, Suzuki Rika)
Voiced by: Asuka Nishi (Japanese); Alexis Tipton (English)
Emi's friend and co-worker at the call center, who develops romantic feelings for Ashiya. She later learns the truth and becomes involved in the issues of Ente Isla. Although her confession with Ashiya is turned down, she has continued to not give up on him reciprocating her feelings.
Mayumi Kisaki (木崎 真弓, Kisaki Mayumi)
Voiced by: Yumi Uchiyama (Japanese); Caitlin Glass (English)
The manager of MgRonald's, who dreams of opening up her own restaurant, and in a conversation with Maou, discussed the possibility of taking him with her when she does open her own business.
Emeralda Etuva (エメラダ・エトゥーヴァ, Emerada Etūva)
Voiced by: Azumi Asakura (Japanese); Monica Rial (English)
Emilia's friend and comrade from Ente Isla. She is proficient in alchemy and is a court magician, and the highest ranking official serving directly under the ruler of the Holy Saint Aire Empire. After returning from Earth, she seems to have developed a fondness for modern conveniences such as the telephone.
Albert Ende (アルバート・エンデ, Arubāto Ende)
Voiced by: Hiroki Yasumoto (Japanese); Christopher Sabat (English)
Emilia's friend and comrade from Ente Isla, who works as a lumberjack and lives in a forest, away from human society.
Olba Meyer (オルバ・メイヤー, Oruba Meiyā)
Voiced by: Katsuhisa Hōki (Japanese); Mark Stoddard (English)
The rogue Archbishop of the Church of Ente Isla, who betrays Emilia and temporarily joins forces with Lucifer to kill her and Sadao, but is arrested after his plans fail. He had worked with the corrupt Church of Ente Isla to kill those who opposed them, including members of the Allied Knight Order and those associated with them. He was Crestia's superior and often gave her orders that involved the brutal slaughter of the church's enemies. After Sadao defeats him in Sasakuza, he is placed under guard in a hospital, where he regains consciousness and escapes, attempting to reestablish his contract with Lucifer and aiding Sariel in his battle against Sadao by casting a spell to increase his power. However, it is revealed that Lucifer tricked him into creating a panic with the Moon spell, allowing Sadao to regain his magic and defeat Sariel, after which Lucifer captures him.
Mitsuki Sarue (猿江 三月, Sarue Mitsuki) / Sariel (サリエル, Sarieru)
Voiced by: Yūichi Iguchi (Japanese); Scott Freeman, Kyle Igneczi (season 2) (English)
An Archangel hired by the Church of Ente Isla along with Crestia Bell as part of their Execution Inquisition. He first attacks Emilia in a grocery store while in disguise. To learn about Sadao and Emi in the human world, he assumes the identity of Mitsuki Sarue, claiming to be the manager of the newly opened Sentucky Fried Chicken franchise in Hatagaya. He later teams up with Crestia to kill Sadao and Emi. He wields a scythe and possesses a magic called the "Wicked Light of the Fallen", which nullifies sacred powers; he also draws his magic from the Moon, with his power increasing the closer he is to it. During his battle with Emilia, he demands that she return the holy sword "Better Half" to Heaven. He defeats and tortures Emilia while taking Chiho hostage, but ultimately Sadao defeats him. Afterward, he falls in love with the manager of MgRonalds, much to Emilia's annoyance and Kisaki's dismay.
Miki Shiba (志波 美輝, Shiba Miki)
Voiced by: Kimiko Saitō (Japanese); Cynthia Cranz (English)
The owner of the "Villa Rosa Sasazuka" apartment building where Sadao and Suzuno live. It is later revealed that she is the eleventh Sephira for Earth's Tree of Life and one of Earth's guardians.
Amane Ooguro (志大黑 天祢, Ōguro Amane)
Voiced by: Yuko Kaida (Japanese); Dani Chambers (English)
Miki Shiba's niece, who hires the tenants of Villa Rosa Sasazuka to work at her family's resort for the summer after everyone is kicked out of the complex due to renovations following the battle with Gabriel. It is later revealed that she is the Daughter of "Understanding" of Earth, one of the eleven Sephira of Earth's Tree of Life, thus making her a guardian of Earth.
Yuki Mizushima (水島 由姫, Mizushima Yuki)
Voiced by: Mamiko Noto (Japanese); Rachel Robinson (English)
The manager of Fushima Park's MgRonald's branch.
Alas Ramus (アラス・ラムス, Arasu Ramusu)
Voiced by: Hina Kino (Japanese); Sarah Wiedenheft (English)
The "daughter" of Sadao and Emi, who is formed by "Yesod" and brought to Japan by Lailah. She later fuses with Emi's sword to help Emi become more powerful.
Acieth Alla (アシエス・アーラ, Ashiesu Āra) / Tsubasa Satou (サトウツバサ, Satō Tsubasa)
Voiced by: Madoka Asahina (Japanese); Megan Shipman (English)
Alas Ramus' younger sister and another fragment of "Yesod". She lives with Emi's father, Nord Justinia, and later fuses with Maou to help him become more powerful.
Farfarello (ファーファレルロ, Fāfareruro)
Voiced by: Tomokazu Sugita (Japanese); Christopher Wehkamp (English)
Erone (イルオーン, Iruōn)
Voiced by: Megumi Han (Japanese); Rowan Gilvie (English)
The personification of the Gevurah Sephiroth from Entre Isla. After breaking off his partnership with the demons, Erone, having recognized Alas Ramus during his fight against Emi, returns to Earth to find his "sister". He eventually becomes a ward under the protection of Emi's parents Lailah and Nord Justina.
Camael (カマエル, Kamaeru)
Voiced by: Chikahiro Kobayashi (Japanese); Xan Cramer (English)
Lailah (ライラ, Raira)
Voiced by: Kikuko Inoue (Japanese); Morgan Lauré (English)
Emi's mother and an archangel.
Nord Justina (ノルド・ユスティーナ, Norudo Yusutīna) / Hiroshi Satou (サトウヒロシ, Satō Hiroshi)
Voiced by: Atsushi Ono (Japanese); Andrew Chandler, Jeff Plunk (season 2) (English)
Emi's father. He was believed to have perished during Lucifer's siege on the Western Continent, though it is later revealed that he survived.
Gabriel (ガブリエル, Gaburieru)
Voiced by: Takehito Koyasu (Japanese); Ian Sinclair (English)
A first generation archangel from Ente Isla who commands the lower ranking angels. He descends from Heaven in order to reclaim the fragments of "Yesod" after Sariel fails to take the Sacred Sword from Emilia. He wields the secret sword Durandall.
Camio (カミーオ, Kamīo)
Voiced by: Kenichi Ogata (Japanese); Ben Bryant (English)
The minister of the Demon World and the Deputy Demon King during Sadao's absence.
Raguel (ラグエル, Ragueru)
Voiced by: Masaya Matsukaze (Japanese); Ben Balmaceda (English)
An angel from Ente Isla, who is tasked with monitoring the actions of every angel and announcing the declaration of an angel turning into a fallen angel.
Kaori Shouji (東海林 佳織, Shōji Kaori)
Voiced by: Haruka Yamazaki (Japanese); Anastasia Muñoz, Sarah Roach (season 2) (English)
Chiho's classmate.
Senichi Sasaki (佐々木 千一, Sasaki Sen'ichi)
Voiced by: Haruo Yamagishi (Japanese); Sonny Strait (English)
A police officer. He is Chiho's father, Riho's husband, Manji's younger brother, Yumiko's brother-in-law, Kazuma's uncle, Hinako's uncle-in-law, and Hitoshi's great-uncle.
Riho Sasaki (佐々木 里穂, Sasaki Riho)
Voiced by: Takako Honda (Japanese); Jamie Marchi, Stephanie Young (season 2) (English)
A housewife. she is Chiho's mother, Senichi's wife, Manji and Yumiko's sister-in-law, Kazuma's aunt, Hinako's aunt-in-law, and Hitoshi's great-aunt.
Manji Sasaki (佐々木 卍, Sasaki Manji)
Voiced by: Masashi Nogawa (Japanese); Brian Mathis (English)
Chiho's uncle, Yumiko's husband, Senichi's older brother, Kazuma's father, Hinako's father, and Hitoshi's grandfather.
Yumiko Sasaki (佐々木 由美子, Sasaki Yumiko)
Voiced by: Hitomi Shogawa (Japanese); Sara Ragsdale (English)
Chiho's aunt, Manji's wife and Senichi's sister-in-law, Kazuma's mother, Hinako's mother-in-law, and Hitoshi's grandmother.
Ei Sasaki (佐々木 エイ, Sasaki Ei)
Voiced by: Miyuki Ichijo (Japanese); Linda Leonard (English)
Chiho and Kazuma's grandmother, Manji and Senichi's mother, Riho's mother-in-law, Hinako's grandmother-in-law, and Hitoshi's great-grandmother.
Kazuma Sasaki (佐々木 一馬, Sasaki Kazuma)
Voiced by: Shōya Ishige (Japanese); Kyle Phillips (English)
Chiho's cousin, Manji and Yumiko's son, Hinako's husband, and Hitoshi's father.
Hinako Sasaki (佐々木 陽奈子, Sasaki Hinako)
Voiced by: Harumi Sakurai (Japanese); Bryn Apprill (English)
Chiho's cousin-in-law, Manji and Yumiko's daughter-in-law, Ei's granddaughter-in-law, Kazuma's wife, and Hitoshi's mother.
Hitoshi Sasaki (佐々木 一志, Sasaki Hitoshi)
Voiced by: Miyu Yoshizaki (Japanese); Kristen McGuire (English)
Chiho's first cousin once removed, Kazuma and Hinako's son, Manji and Yumiko's grandson, Senichi's and Riho's great-nephew, and Ei's great-grandson.

== Media ==
=== Light novels ===
The Devil Is a Part-Timer! began as a light novel series written by Satoshi Wagahara, with illustrations by the artist 029 (Oniku). Wagahara originally entered the first novel in the series, originally titled Maōjō wa Rokujō-ikkan! (魔王城は六畳一間!, The Devil's Fortress is a Single Room with Six Tatami Mats!), into ASCII Media Works' 17th Dengeki Novel Prize in 2010 and the novel won the Silver Prize. The first novel was published by ASCII Media Works on February 10, 2011, under their Dengeki Bunko imprint, with an additional 20 main novels, two prequel novels, one spin-off novel, and six bonus novels being released since. The final main novel was initially scheduled to be published on July 10, 2020, but was delayed to August 7, 2020, as a result of the effects caused by COVID-19. Two bonus novels (Hataraku Maō-sama! 4.1 and Hataraku Maō-sama! Tengo) were packaged with the first and second Blu-ray volumes (respectively) of the anime adaptation's second season.

The series is licensed in North America by Yen Press, with the first main novel being released on April 21, 2015, and the last main novel on April 19, 2022.

No.	Original release date	Original ISBN	English release date	English ISBN
1	February 10, 2011	978-4-04-870270-6	April 21, 2015	978-0-316-38312-7
"The Devil Focuses on His Career for Monetary Purposes" (「魔王、生活のために労働に励む」); "The Devil Goes on a Date in Shinjuku with This Girl from Work" (「魔王、新宿で後輩とデートする」); "The Devil and the Hero Stand Strong in Sasazuka" (「魔王と勇者、笹塚に立つ」)
2	June 10, 2011	978-4-04-870547-9	August 25, 2015	978-0-316-38501-5
"The Devil's Finances are Shored Up by a Helpful Neighbor" (「魔王、近所付き合いで家計を助けられる」); "The Hero Owes a Favor Following a Wild Chain of Misunderstandings" (「勇者、勘違いの連鎖の果てに借りを作る」); "The Devil and the Hero Risk Their Lives for Their Work Responsibilities" (「魔王と勇者、職責の全うに命を賭ける」)
3	November 10, 2011	978-4-04-870815-9	December 15, 2015	978-0-316-38502-2
"Introduction" (前書き); "The Devil King and the Hero Unexpectedly Become Parents" (「魔王と勇者、身に覚えなく親になる」); "The Devil King Experiences a Lifestyle Change" (「魔王、その生活が一変する」); "The Devil King and the Hero Take a Hint and Hit the Theme Park" (「魔王と勇者、薦めに従い遊園地に行く」); "The Devil King Feels the Pain of Loss" (「魔王、大切なものを失う悲しみを知る」)
4	February 10, 2012	978-4-04-886344-5	April 19, 2016	978-0-316-38503-9
"Prologue" (「序章」); "The Devil King Finds Himself Jobless, Then Homeless" (「魔王、家も仕事も失い途方に暮れる」); "The Hero Helps the Devil King Remodel His Workplace" (「勇者、魔王の職場の大改造に協力する」); "The Devil King Marvels at the Wide World (and Choshi)" (「魔王、銚子と世界の広さを知る」); "Epilogue" (「終章」)
5	June 10, 2012	978-4-04-886654-5	August 30, 2016	978-0-316-38504-6
"Prologue" (「序章」); "The Devil Strongly Demands TV Privileges" (「魔王、テレビ購入を強硬に主張する」); "The Devil Explains Human Relations" (「魔王、人との関わりを説く」); "The Devil and the Hero Decide to Focus on More Important Matters" (「魔王と勇者、とりあえず目の前の出来事に集中する」); "Epilogue" (「終章」)
6	October 10, 2012	978-4-04-886990-4	December 20, 2016	978-0-316-38506-0
"Prologue" (「序章」); "The Devil Clocks Back In" (「魔王、職場に復帰する」); "The Hero and the Devil Wonder What the Hell They're Doing With Their Lives" (「魔王と勇者、日常に戸惑う」); "The Hero and the Devil Take a Step Toward a New Dream" (「魔王と勇者、新たな夢の一歩を踏み出す」); "Epilogue" (「終章」)
7	February 10, 2013	978-4-04-891406-2	April 18, 2017	978-0-316-46936-4
"The Devil Pledges to Stay Legitimate" (「魔王、誠実な商売を改めて決意する」); "The Devil Plucks a Cat Off the Street" (「魔王、捨て猫を拾う」); "The Devil and the Hero Go Futon Shopping" (「魔王と勇者、お布団を買いに」); "A Few Days Before The Teenager is a Part-Timer!" (「はたらく女子高生 -a few days ago-」)
8	April 10, 2013	978-4-04-891580-9	August 22, 2017	978-0-316-47391-0
"Prologue" (「序章」); "The Hero Demands a Little Time Off" (「勇者、しばしの暇乞いをする」); "The Devil Has an Encounter" (「魔王、出会う」); "The Devil is a Little Late to the Punch" (「魔王、出遅れる」); "Extra Chapter: The Hero Has a Cry" (「続章 勇者、泣く」)
9	August 10, 2013	978-4-04-891854-1	December 19, 2017	978-0-316-47418-4
"Prologue" (「序章」); "The Devil Devises a Full Military Expedition" (「魔王、親征を決意する」); "The Hero Discovers She Can't Come Home Again" (「勇者、故郷に惑う」); "The Devil Makes Every Preparation Possible" (「魔王、余念無く準備し出立する」); "The Devil, Once Upon a Time" (「魔王、今昔物語」); "Extra Chapter: The Devil Blows Chunks" (「続章 魔王、吐く」)
10	December 10, 2013	978-4-04-866161-4	April 24, 2018	978-0-316-47420-7
"Prologue" (「序章」); "The Devil Loses His Social Standing" (「魔王、立場を失う」); "The Hero Dances on the Battlefield" (「勇者、戦陣に踊る」); "The Devil and the Hero Witness Ente Isla's Transformation" (「魔王と勇者、エンテ・イスラの変革に立ち会う」); "Epilogue" (「終章」); "Extra Chapter" (「続章」)
11	May 10, 2014	978-4-04-866554-4	August 21, 2018	978-0-316-47423-8
"Prologue" (「序章」); "The Devil and the Hero have a Grand Disagreement" (「魔王と勇者、盛大にすれ違う」); "The Devil and the Hero get All Hung Up on their Relative Positions" (「魔王と勇者、立ち位置にこだわる」); "The Devil and the Hero Fulfill a Delayed Promise" (「魔王と勇者、遅くなった約束を果たす」)
0	September 10, 2014	978-4-04-866900-9	—	—
12	February 10, 2015	978-4-04-869252-6	December 11, 2018	978-0-316-47425-2
"The Devil Hangs On to His Daily Routine" (「魔王、普通の生活を堅持する」); "The Hero Starts Looking for a New Path" (「勇者、新たな道を探しはじめる」); "The Devil Appreciates the Value of Maintenance" (「魔王、メンテナンスを語る」); "The Devil and the Hero Are Given a Proposition" (「魔王と勇者、取引を持ちかけられる」); "Epilogue" (「終章」)
13	June 10, 2015	978-4-04-865205-6	April 23, 2019	978-1-9753-0265-8
"Prologue" (「序章」); "The Devil Gets Tough" (「魔王、硬い態度を取る」); "The Hero Attempts to Wrangle the Unwrangleable" (「勇者、整理できない事態に頭を抱える」); "The High Schooler Searches for a Guide" (「女子高生、心の指針を探す」); "The Devil and the Hero Face Up to Reality" (「魔王と勇者、目の前の現実に直視する」)
14	September 10, 2015	978-4-04-865379-4	September 3, 2019	978-1-9753-0267-2
"The Hero and High Schooler Become Friends" (「勇者と女子高生、友達になる」); "The Devil Looks Back on the Frugal Life" (「魔王、節約生活を振り返る」); "The Devil Snags a New Phone with the Hero's Money" (「魔王、勇者の金で新しい携帯を手にする」); "The Hero Is Amazed By the Enemy General's Vast Powers" (「勇者、敵幹部の力に驚愕する」); "The Devil Learns About His Boss's Past" (「魔王、上司の過去を知る」); "A Few Days Ago: The Hero Is (about to Be) a Part-Timer!" (「はたらく前の勇者さま！-a a few days ago-」)
15	February 10, 2016	978-4-04-865750-1	December 17, 2019	978-1-9753-0269-6
"Prologue: The Teen and the Call-Center Lady Ring In the New Year" (「序章 女子高生とOL、新年を迎える」); "The Devil King Is Out of the Office (1)" (「魔王、留守にする1」); "The Devil King Is Out of the Office (2)" (「魔王、留守にする2」); "The Devil King Is Out of the Office (3)" (「魔王、留守にする3」); "The Devil King Is Out of the Office (4)" (「魔王、留守にする4」); "The Teen and the Call-Center Lady Ring In the New Year Cont'd" (「続・女子高生とOL、新年を迎える」)
16	June 10, 2016	978-4-04-892118-3	April 21, 2020	978-1-9753-0271-9
"The Devil King Gets Sentimental" (「魔王、軟弱になる」); "The Hero Struggles to Deal with Workplace Issues" (「勇者、職場環境の違いに戸惑う」); "The Devil King and the Hero Don't Have Very Much to Do" (「魔王と勇者、出る幕もなくなる」); "The High-School Teen Changes the World a Tad" (「女子高生、少しだけ世界を変える」); "Epilogue" (「終章」)
0-II	September 10, 2016	978-4-04-892358-3	—	—
HS N! (Note: Hataraku Maō-sama! High School N! is a spin-off novel set in an alternate universe where the events of the main series take place in a high school setting.)	February 10, 2017	978-4-04-892667-6	—	—
17	May 10, 2017	978-4-04-892892-2	September 22, 2020	978-1-9753-0273-3
"Opening" (「序章」); "The Devil King Goes Out to Dinner with His Boss" (「魔王、上司と夕食に行く」); "The Hero Reveals Deep Anxieties About the Future" (「勇者、未来への不安を漏らす」); "The Devil King Makes a Major Decision" (「魔王、一大決心をする」); "The Devil King and the Hero Storm the Demon Realms" (「魔王と勇者、魔界に立つ」)
18	January 10, 2018	978-4-04-893572-2	December 15, 2020	978-1-9753-1632-7
"The Teenager Starts Imagining Beyond Tomorrow" (「女子高生、明日の先を想像する」); "The Hero Realizes the Difficulty of Stepping In" (「勇者、後を継ぐ難しさを思う」); "The Devil King's Army Fights On" (「魔王軍、奮闘する」); "Extra Chapter: The Fallen Angel Recalls" (「続章 堕天使、思い出す」)
SP (Note: Hataraku Maō-sama! SP is an expanded re-release of Hataraku Maō-sama! Volume 5.5, a special volume that was originally packaged with the 1st DVD/Blu-Ray volume of the anime adaptation's first season.)	June 9, 2018	978-4-04-893877-8	—	—
SP 2 (Note: Hataraku Maō-sama! SP2 is an expanded re-release of Hataraku Maō-sama! Volume 2.8, a special volume that was originally packaged with the 6th DVD/Blu-Ray volume of the anime adaptation's first season.)	August 10, 2018	978-4-04-893915-7	—	—
19	September 7, 2018	978-4-04-912022-6	June 8, 2021	978-1-9753-1634-1
"Prologue" (「序章」); "The Hero Gets Her Act Together" (「勇者、決断する」); "The Devil Chooses This Moment to Play It Normal" (「魔王、この期に及んでいつも通り」); "The Teenager Begins Moving the World" (「女子高生、世界を動かし始める」)
20	December 7, 2018	978-4-04-912204-6	August 31, 2021	978-1-9753-1636-5
"The Devil and the Hero Shame Themselves at Work" (「魔王と勇者、職場で肩身が狭くなる」); "The Devil and the Hero Live Under the Same Roof" (「魔王と勇者、一つ屋根の下で過ごす」); "The Devil Is Defeated by the Hero" (「魔王、勇者に敗北す」); "The Teenager Moves the World" (「女子高生、世界を動かす」); "The Devil Is Taken by Surprise" (「魔王、不意を打たれる」); "The Afterstory" (「続章」)
SS	February 9, 2019	978-4-04-912326-5	—	—
21	August 7, 2020	978-4-04-912678-5	April 19, 2022	978-1-9753-4091-9
"Prologue: The Devil Heads for Work" (「序章 魔王、出勤する」); "The Fallen Angel Claims His Relic" (「堕天使、遺産を受け取る」); "The Devil King's Army Moves the Moon" (「魔王軍、 月を動かす」); "The Devil Addresses Past Sins" (「魔王、過去の罪を償う」); "The Hero Finds an Answer and Chooses Her Way" (「勇者、答えを導き方針を固める」); "The Devil Relies on Others for the Future" (「魔王、先々のために人を頼る」); "The Devil and the Hero Challenge the God" (「魔王と勇者、 神に挑む」); "The Devil and the Hero Clobber the God" (「魔王と勇者、神を討つ」); "The Devil and the Hero Settle Matters" (「魔王と勇者、決着をつける」); "Epilogue: The Devil, Not a Part-Timer" (「終章 魔王、はたらく」)
Okawari!! (Note: Hataraku Maō-sama! Okawari!! is an expanded re-release compilation of short stories originally serialized in the Dengeki Nobekomi app.)	July 8, 2022	978-4-04-914281-5	—	—

=== Manga ===
A manga adaptation, illustrated by Akio Hiiragi, was serialized in ASCII Media Works' shōnen manga magazine Dengeki Daioh from February 2012 to July 2025 issues and was collected into 24 volumes. The first tankōbon volume was published on June 27, 2012, and the last on June 26, 2025. Yen Press publishes the manga in North America from March 24, 2015.

No.	Original release date	Original ISBN	English release date	English ISBN
1	June 27, 2012	978-4-04-886721-4	March 24, 2015	978-0-316-38313-4
1. "The Devil Works Part-Time in Sasazuka" (魔王、笹塚でバイトをする); 2. "The Devil Receives an Ominous Text Message" (魔王、謎のメールを受言する); 3. "The Devil Goes on a Date with This Girl from Work" (魔王、後輩とデートする); 4. "The Devil and the Hero Are Trapped" (魔王と勇者、閉じ込められる); 5. "The Hero Experiences a Little Human Kindness" (勇者、人の優しさに触れる); Chapter X: The Demon Lord is Blessed by Some Pork
2	December 15, 2012	978-4-04-891272-3	July 21, 2015	978-0-316-38507-7
6. "The Devil Is Gravely Misunderstood"; 7. "The Devil Inadvertently Makes a Girl Cry"; 8. "The Devil Reveals All"; 9. "The Devil Falls"; 10. "The Devil Fulfills His Trivial Role"; 11. "The Devil Heads Off for Work"
3	May 27, 2013	978-4-04-891688-2	October 27, 2015	978-0-316-38508-4
12. "The Devil Gets Friendly with His Neighbor"; 13. "The Devil Does a Little Detective Work"; 14. "The Devil Feels Safe in Bragging a Little"; 15. "The Devil Is Asked a Favor"; 16. "The Devil Is Tormented by Teenage Love"; Chapter X: The Hero Shops With Her Coworker Chapter X: The Hero Uses a Photo Sticker Booth
4	November 27, 2013	978-4-04-866084-6	January 26, 2016	978-0-316-38509-1
17. "The Hero Unravels a Major Misunderstanding"; 18. "The Hero Builds a Raid Party Bound for Hatagaya"; 19. "The Hero Learns About Her Past Career"; 20. "The Hero Reveals Her Work Obligations"; 21. "The Devil Sets Off atop His Trusty Steed"; Chapter X: The Unemployed Bum Attempts an Honest Career Chapter X: The Teenage Girl Prepares for Her Hot Date
5	March 27, 2014	978-4-04-866394-6	April 26, 2016	978-0-316-31489-3
22. "The Devil Explains Matters to the Cleric"; 23. "The Devil Fulfills His Assistant Manager Duties"; 24. "The Devil Sits at His Dinner Table in Sasazuka"; 25. "The Devil Grants His Servant a Break"; 26. "The Devil Pledges to Stay Legitimate"
6	August 27, 2014	978-4-04-866843-9	July 19, 2016	978-0-316-36014-2
27. "The Devil and the Hero Encounter Something Unexpected"; 28. "The Devil and the Hero Gain New Titles"; 29. "The Devil Asks His Work Friend for a Little Help"; 30. "The Hero Hits the Amusement Park Fully Equipped"; 31. "The Devil Marvels at a Finely Hones Military Performance"
7	February 27, 2015	978-4-04-869209-0	October 25, 2016	978-0-316-36015-9
32. "The Devil and the Hero Converse on the Ferris Wheel"; 33. "The Devil Is Asked for His Child Back"; 34. "The Devil and the Hero Share the Floor for the Night"; 35. "The Hero Declares She Will Clean Up Her Messes"; 36. "The Hero Kicks Out an Uninvited Guest"; 37. "The Devil Feels the Pain of Loss"
8	September 26, 2015	978-4-04-865350-3	March 21, 2017	978-0-316-55316-2
38. "The Devil Loses His Job and Home"; 39. "The Devil Gets a Hot Work Trip"; 40. "The Devil Lands a New Job"; 41. "The Devil Remodels a Seaside Snack Bar"; 42. "The Devil Runs Into Something a Tad Unexpected on Kimigahama Beach"
9	March 26, 2016	978-4-04-865805-8	June 20, 2017	978-0-316-55848-8
43. "The Hero Lands a Telling Blow at the Beach House"; 44. "The Devil Has a Proposal for His Boss"; 45. "The Devil Throws His Weight Around a Little"; 46. "The Devil Basks in the Glories of Choushi"; Chapter X: "The Cleric Becomes a Samurai-Drama Ronin"
10	September 27, 2016	978-4-04-892290-6	September 19, 2017	978-0-316-56267-6
47. "The Devil Demands a Rather Expensive Purchase"; 48. "The Hero Makes Her Own Key Ring"; 49. "The Devil Drops a Favor to the Noodle-Shop Clerk"; Chapter X: "The Devil and the Hero Buy a Children's Futon (Part 1)" Chapter X: "The Devil and the Hero Buy a Children's Futon (Part 2)"
11	March 27, 2017	978-4-04-892768-0	May 22, 2018	978-1-9753-2643-2
50. "The Devil Gets in the Way of Romance"; 51. "The Devil Decides to Help Out in the Hospital"; 52. "The Hero Visits Skytree Before It's Even Open"; 53. "The Hero Puts Things Off for Later"; 54. "The Devil TV-is His Castle"
12	October 27, 2017	978-4-04-893424-4	October 30, 2018	978-1-9753-0182-8
55. "The Devil Ships Off to Komagane"; 56. "The Devil Goes Stargazing in Nagano"; 57. "The Hero Explains How Vegetables Grow"; 58. "The Hero Scores an Easy One-on-One Victory"; 59. "The Hero Earns a Nickname"
13	April 27, 2018	978-4-04-893804-4	March 19, 2019	978-1-9753-0377-8
60. "The Devil Grabs a Handful"; 61. "The Hero Enters a Car Through the Roof"; 62. "The Devil Gets Invited Back Next Summer"; 63. "The Devil Brings a Guest to the Castle"; 64. "The Devil Wishes His Rescued Friend Good Health"; Chapter X: "The Devil, Hero, and High Schooler Ring In the New Year"
14	January 26, 2019	978-4-04-912291-6	August 20, 2019	978-1-9753-0555-0
65. "The Devil and Hero Have an Awkward Moment in the Bath"; 66. "The Devil and Hero Have a Spat"; 67. "The Devil Explains the Significance of Hourly Labor"; 68. "The Devil Announces the New Devil King's Army"; 69. "The Hero Comes Home"
15	July 26, 2019	978-4-04-912642-6	February 18, 2020	978-1-9753-0738-7
70. "The Devil Has an Encounter"; 71. "The Cleric Uncovers a Tiny Clue"; 72. "The Devil Faces a Terrifying Threat"; 73. "The Very Wet Devil Flies Off"; 74. "The High-School Girl Is Scared by Lightning"; 75. "The Demon Reveals The Truth"; 76. "The Devil Gets Real Close to a Girl"; 77. "The Devil Gallantly Steps In"
16	March 10, 2020	978-4-04-913107-9	December 15, 2020	978-1-9753-1871-0
78. "The Devil Lectures an Angel"; 79. "The Devil Thinks About Art"; 80. "The Devil Tries to Rework His Shifts"; 81. "The Devil Wholeheartedly Prepares to Go"; 82. "The Hero Returns Home"; 83. "The Hero Screams"
17	October 26, 2020	978-4-04-913480-3	November 30, 2021	978-1-9753-3607-3
84. "The Hero Has a Cry"; 85. "The Devil, Once Upon a Time"; 86. "The Devil Blows His Chunks"; 87. "The Devil Loses His Social Standing"; 88. "The Hero Has the Truth Preached to Her"; 89. "The Devil's Like an Open Book"
18	June 25, 2021	978-4-04-913856-6	May 17, 2022	978-1-9753-4286-9
90. "The Cleric Shows How She Earned That Title"; 91. "The Hero Is Cheered by a Cryptic Missive"; 92. "The Devil Is Rocketed Into the Air"; 93. "The Hero Kicks Off the Final Battle"; 94. "The Hero Quells her Anxieties for the Future"
19	February 26, 2022	978-4-04-914257-0	November 22, 2022	978-1-9753-5107-6
95. "The Devil Crashes In On His Scooter"; 96. "The Devil Rants At The Angels"; 97. "The Angel Reminisces"; 98. "The Devil And The Hero Return To Sasazuka"; 99. "The Devil Remains A Part – Timer"
20	October 27, 2022	978-4-04-914656-1	September 19, 2023	978-1-9753-7389-4
100. "The Devil Gets Groomed Up"; 101. "The Hero Lets Her Fists Do the Talking"; 102. "The Great Demon General Confronts a Home Invader"; 103. "The Devil Invites His Scary Neighbor to Hang with Him"; 104. "The Devil Outdebates the Warrior King"
21	May 26, 2023	978-4-04-915057-5	June 18, 2024	978-1-9753-9474-5
105. "The Devil Persuades the Warrior"; 106. "The Devil Declares War"; 107. "The Devil Gains the Swagger of a King"; 108. "The Devil Woos His Prisoners"; 109. "The Devil Wages the Final Battle"
22	December 26, 2023	978-4-04-915406-1	December 10, 2024	979-8-8554-0395-4
23	October 25, 2024	978-4-04-915962-2	November 25, 2025	979-8-8554-2035-7
24	June 26, 2025	978-4-04-916452-7	July 28, 2026	979-8-8554-3397-5

==== Spin-off ====
A spin-off manga series set in an alternate universe titled The Devil Is a Part-Timer! High School! (はたらく魔王さま！ハイスクール！, Hataraku Maō-sama! Hai Sukūru!), written by Satoshi Wagahara and illustrated by Kurone Mishima, began serialization in the July 2012 issue of ASCII Media Works' Dengeki Maoh magazine. Its chapters have been compiled in five tankōbon volumes, released between January 26, 2013, and April 24, 2015. Yen Press released all five volumes in North America between March 24, 2015, and October 25, 2016.

No.	Original release date	Original ISBN	English release date	English ISBN
1	January 26, 2013	978-4-04-891374-4	March 24, 2015	978-0-316-38511-4
1. "1st Period: The Mysterious Transfer Student Arrives" (1時限目 謎の転校生、現る); 2. "2nd Period: The Innocent Teenager Misunderstands" (2時限目 無垢な女子高生、誤解する); 3. "3rd Period: The Kind Classmate Starts Meddling" (3時限目 親切な級友、世話を焼く); 4. "4th Period: The Faithful Watchdog Protects The Devil's Castle" (4時限目 忠実な番犬、魔王城を守る); 5. "5th Period: The Store Assistant Pounds the Pavement" (5時限目 頼れる看板娘、張り切る); 6. "6th Period: The Devil King's Gang Hits The Road (1)" (6時限目 魔王さまご一行、遠足へ行く①); 7. "7th Period: The Devil King's Gang Hits The Road (2)" (7時限目 魔王さまご一行、遠足へ行く②); 8. "Closing Bell: Afterword" (放課後 あとがき)
2	May 27, 2013	978-4-04-891647-9	November 17, 2015	978-0-316-38512-1
1. "8th Period: The Fair Maidens Make Sparks Fly" (8時限目 可憐な乙女たち、火花を散らす); 2. "9th Period: The Schoolmaster Makes a Wise Decision" (9時限目 学園の主、英断を下す); 3. "10th Period: The Hapless Demon Seeks Aid" (10時限目 窮する悪魔、助けを乞う); 4. "11th Period: The Udon-Selling Girl Relies On The Devil King" (11時限目 うどん売りの少女、魔王を頼る); 5. "12th Period: A Nameless Supporter Makes a Contribution" (12時限目 名もなき支持者、陣中見舞いを送る); 6. "Extra Credit: Special Chapter (1) Dengeki Books Magazine Special #1" (課外授業 特別編①電撃文庫MAGAZINE出張版 その1); 7. "Extra Credit: Special Chapter (2) Dengeki Books Magazine Special #2" (課外授業 特別編②電撃文庫MAGAZINE出張版 その2); 8. "Extra Credit: Special Chapter (3) Special Edition For ASCII Media Works 20th Anniversary Premium Booklet" (課外授業 特別編③アスキー・メディアワークス20周年記念プレミアム小冊子出張版); 9. "Extra Credit: The Devil is a Part-Timer Anime Voice Recording Report" (課外授業 アニメ『はたらく魔王さま!』アフレコレポート); 10. "Closing Bell: Afterword" (放課後 あとがき)
3	December 21, 2013	978-4-04-866184-3	April 26, 2016	978-0-316-39796-4
1. "13th Period: The Pained Hero Has Her Secrets Exposed" (13時限目 悩める勇者乙女の神秘に触れるす); 2. "14th Period: The Devil King and Hero Attempt A Human Dance" (14時限目 魔王と勇者、人間界のダンスを踊る); 3. "15th Period: The Sore-Loser Hero Takes the Bait" (15時限目 負けず嫌いの勇者、売られたケンカを買う); 4. "16th Period: The "Third" Angel Attacks" (16時限目 第三使徒、襲来する); 5. "17th Period: The Devil King and Hero Invade Enemy Lines" (17時限目 魔王と勇者、敵陣に乗り込む); 6. "18th Period: The Future Student Council President Sets Off" (18時限目 未来の生徒会長、出陣する); 7. "19th Period: The Fallen Angel Earns a Loyal Voter Base" (19時限目 堕ちた天使、熱狂的な支持を得る); 8. "Closing Bell: Afterword" (放課後 あとがき)
4	September 27, 2014	978-4-04-866872-9	June 28, 2016	978-0-316-27239-1
5	April 27, 2015	978-4-04-869300-4	October 25, 2016	978-0-316-31798-6

==== Other ====
A four-panel manga anthology volume was published by ASCII Media Works on June 27, 2013. Another spin-off manga series titled Hataraku Maō-sama no Meshi! (はたらく魔王さまのメシ！), illustrated by Oji Sadō, began serialization on Kadokawa Corporation's Comic Walker website on August 28, 2019. It has been collected in 4 volumes as of October 27, 2022.

A comic anthology by different manga creators was released in Japan in 2022 to celebrate the release of the anime's second season, with the English release being in 2023.

=== Anime ===
A 13-episode anime television series adaptation of The Devil Is a Part-Timer!, produced by White Fox and directed by Naoto Hosoda, aired between April 4 and June 27, 2013. The anime has Masahiro Yokotani as the script supervisor and Atsushi Ikariya adapts 029's characters' designs. Funimation streamed the series as it aired and released it on home video in summer 2014. It was later streamed on the FunimationNOW service but the show was moved to the similar Crunchyroll streaming service after Sony Pictures Television and Aniplex (via Funimation Global Group) purchased the assets of Crunchyroll from WarnerMedia in 2021. The opening theme is "Zero!!" by Minami Kuribayashi. There are three ending theme songs: "Gekka" (月花; lit. "Moon Flower"), "Star Chart" (スターチャート, Sutā Chāto), and "Tsumabiku Hitori" (ツマビクヒトリ), all by Nano Ripe. Muse Communication holds the distribution rights in Southeast Asia.

A second season was announced at the Kadokawa Light Novel Expo 2020 event in March 2021, with the main cast reprising their roles. The second season, titled The Devil Is a Part-Timer!!, is animated by 3Hz, with Daisuke Tsukushi directing, Yūdai Iino designing the characters, Yoshihiro Takeda serving as chief animation director and the rest of the staff returning from the first season. The second season aired from July 14 to September 29, 2022, simultaneously on Tokyo MX and Disney+. The opening theme is "With" by Minami Kuribayashi, while the ending theme is "Mizukagami no Sekai" (水鏡の世界; lit. "The World in the Water's Reflection") by Marina Horiuchi. Muse Communication licensed the second season in Southeast Asia.

A sequel was announced following the conclusion of the second season. It was later confirmed to be the second part of season 2, which aired from July 13 to September 28, 2023. The opening theme is "Hikari no Nai Machi" (光のない街; lit. "Town Without Light") by Nano Ripe, while the ending theme is "Bloomin'" by Liyuu.

== See also ==
- Kuma Kuma Kuma Bear, another light novel series illustrated by the same artist
