= Tokorozawa Sakura Town =

Attraction in Tokorozawa, Saitama, Japan

Coordinates: 35.7973°N 139.5075°E

Official logo

Tokorozawa Sakura Town (Japanese: ところざわサクラタウン, Hepburn: Tokorozawa Sakura Taun) is a pop cultural attraction complex in Tokorozawa, Saitama, Japan which opened in the fall of 2020. It is a joint project of the Kadokawa Corporation and the city of Tokorozawa. The development has five main components; the Kadokawa Culture Center, the Da Vinci store, the EJ Anime hotel (closed in 2022) Japan Pavilion, and the Musashino Reiwa Shrine. It had a partial opening on April 1, 2020, and opened fully on November 6 of the same year.

== Kadokawa Culture Center ==
The Kadokawa Culture Museum is a multiple museum building designed by Kengo Kuma (famed for his Japan National Stadium, the host venue of the 2020 Summer Olympics in Tokyo). It features the permanent outdoor art installation "Resonating Life in the Acorn Forest" by TeamLab as well as a double-height 8-meter-tall (26 ft) library housing fifty thousand plus volumes which can morph into a 'bookshelf theater' via projection mapping.

The museum structure is a monolith, the facade of which is clad in 20,000 plus granite pieces fitted to the multiple shifts within its obtuse shape. Kuma has said of the building's design that "It represents the Earth's energy that breaks through the ground".

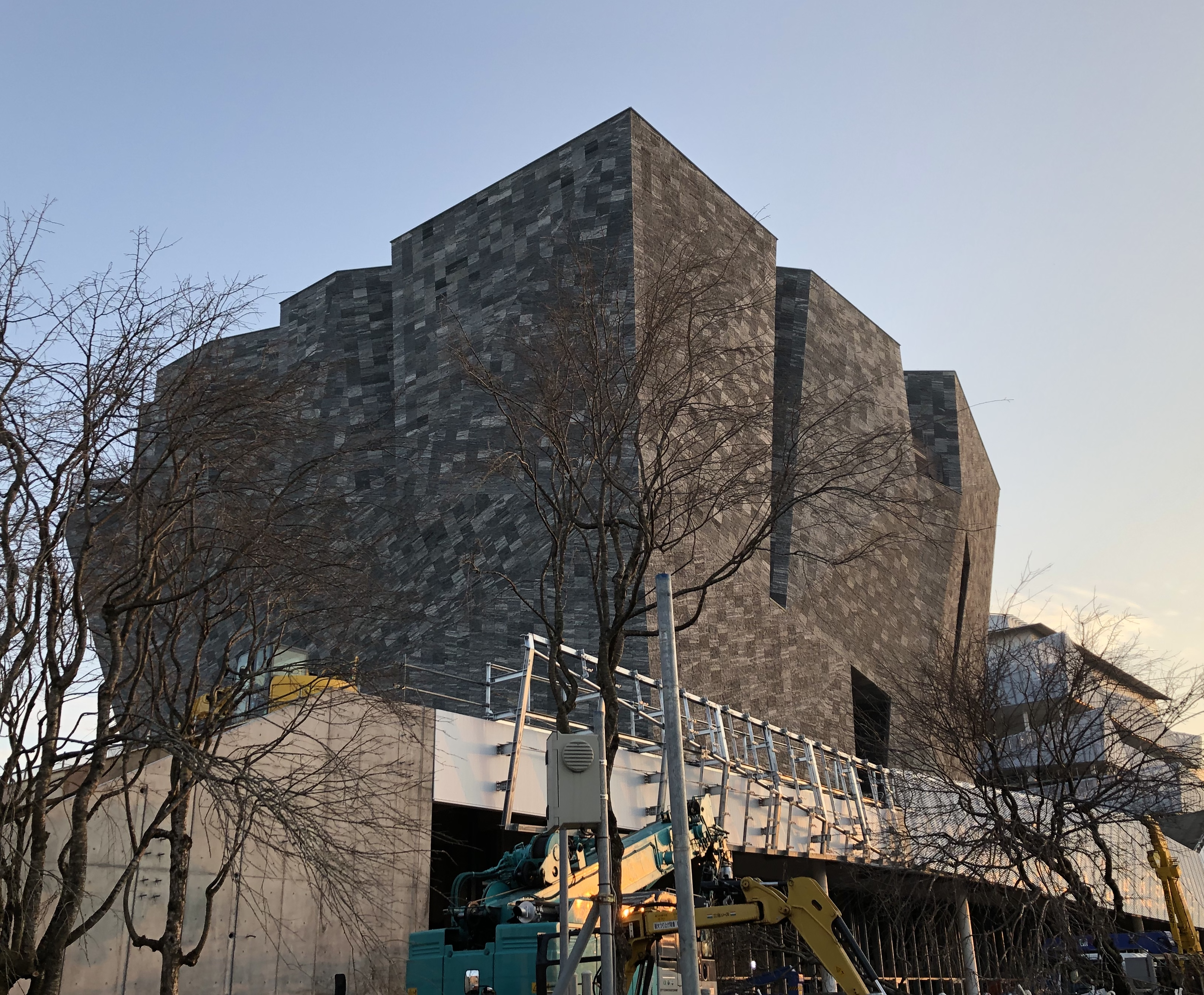
Kadokawa Culture Museum

== The Da Vinci Store ==
This experience-based bookstore carries some 40,000 titles, 10,000 of which are from the Kadokawa corporation. The bookstore is run by the Kadokawa Corporation's editorial department.

== Musashino Reiwa Shrine ==
This shrine, like the Kadokawa culture center is designed by Kengo Kuma. The shrine features two komainu sculptures at both sides of its outside entrance which were sculpted by Yoshimasa Tsuchiya. The shrine also has a mural by Yoshitaka Amano, who is renowned for his Final Fantasy work.

== See also ==
- The Great Yokai War: Guardians
