= Ichiei =

- Gender: Male

Origin
- Origin: Japanese
- Meaning: Different meanings depending on the kanji used

Ichiei (written: 一榮 or 市衛) is a masculine Japanese given name. Notable people with the name include:

- Ichiei Ishibumi (石踏 一榮; born 1981), Japanese writer
- Ichiei Muroi (室井 市衛; born 1974), Japanese footballer
