= List of High School DxD volumes =

High School DxD is a light novel series written by Ichiei Ishibumi and illustrated by Miyama-Zero. It has been published in Dragon Magazine since September 20, 2008, under the Fujimi Fantasia Bunko imprint. The series follows Issei Hyodo, a lecherous high school student attending Kuoh Academy who is killed on his first date. He is later brought back to life as a devil by Rias Gremory, a beautiful crimson-haired girl who is the heiress of the Gremory Family of devils and President of the Occult Research Club, and must work his way to the top so that he may one day fulfill his dream of building a harem. The first volume of High School DxD was released by Fujimi Shobo on September 20, 2008.

Ishibumi has grouped the light novels into story arcs. The first arc, titled The Red Dragon Emperor's Awakening (赤龍帝覚醒 Sekiryūtei Kakusei), ran through the first two volumes. Birth of the Breast Dragon Emperor (乳龍帝誕生 Chichiryūtei Tanjō) is the second story arc and follows volumes three through six. The Heroic Oppai Dragon (英雄（ヒーロー）おっぱいドラゴン Hīrō Oppai Doragon) follows volumes seven through twelve.[LN 12 afterword] The fourth arc, The Legend of Oppai Dragon and his Lively Companions (おっぱいドラゴンと愉快な仲間たちの伝説 Oppai Doragon to Yukaina Nakamatachi no Densetsu), follows volumes fourteen through twenty-one. [LN 14 afterword] The fifth arc, Red Dragon Emperor of the Blazing Truth × White Dragon Emperor of the Morning Star: The True Dragon(s) of the Kuoh Academy (燚誠の赤龍帝×明星の白龍皇 -駒王学園の真なる龍（ハイスクールD×D）), starts at volume twenty-two and is the final arc of the series; ending at volume twenty-five. The author has announced a sequel to the series is to be released fall 2018. The light novels also feature a series of side stories set in between the main storyline, and are often compiled into volumes. So far, three short story collections (Volume 8, Volume 13 and Volume 15) have been published.^{[LN 8]}^{[LN 13]}^{[LN 15]} As of March 20, 2018, twenty five volumes have been released under their Fujimi Fantasia Bunko imprint. Individual chapters of the novels are called "Lives".

A manga adaptation illustrated by Hiroji Mishima began serialization in the July 2010 issue of Dragon Magazine, and later in Monthly Dragon Age in its March 2011 issue. The first volume was published by Fujimi Shobo on June 9, 2011, with a total of seven volumes available in Japan as of December 8, 2014, under their Dragon Comics Age imprint. A spinoff manga, called High School DxD: Asia and Koneko's Secret Contracts!? (ハイスクールD×D アーシア&小猫 ヒミツのけいやく!?, Haisukūru Dī Dī: Āshia ando Koneko Himitsu no Keiyaku!?), illustrated by Hiroichi, was serialized in Monthly Dragon Age from the October 2011 issue (Released on September 9, 2011) to the April 2012 issue (Released on March 9, 2012). Serving as a side story, the manga takes place after chapter 10 of the main manga, and centers on Asia Argento's first duties as a Devil. It was later released as a tankōbon volume on March 9, 2012. Yen Press had licensed the spin-off for an English release and released the volume on December 16, 2014. A second spin-off series, titled High School DxD: The Work of a Devil (ハイスクールD×D アクマのおしごと, Haisukūru Dī Dī: Akuma no Oshigoto), began in the April issue of Monthly Dragon Age. Illustrated by SODA, it adapts the short stories found in the light novels.

== Volumes ==
=== High School DxD light novels ===
No.	Title	Original release date	English release date
01	Diablos of the Old School Building; Kyūkōsha no Diaborosu (旧校舎のディアボロス)	September 20, 2008; 978-4-8291-3326-2	October 20, 2020; 978-1-9753-1225-1
1. Life.0; 2. Life.1: "I Quit Being Human."; 3. Life.2: "I Start as a Devil."; 4. Life.3: "I Made a Friend."; 5. Life.4: "I'm Saving My Friend!"; 6. New Life; 7. Afterwords
Issei Hyodo, a perverted Kuoh Academy student who has had little luck with girls, is asked out by a cute girl named Yuma Amano. At the end of their date (his first ever), the girl asks for him to die for her and fatally stabs him in the chest with a spear, but he is later revived by Rias Gremory, a crimson-haired school beauty, who reveals herself as a devil and his new master. He is recruited to the Occult Research Club, where he hands out flyers and attempts to establish contracts in order to advance as a devil and eventually become a Harem King. After dealing with some unusual contacts, he befriends a newly transferred nun named Asia Argento, and later observes Rias' team take on a stray devil. He encounters renegade priest Freed Sellzen who works with Yuma Amano, revealed to be the fallen angel Raynare, the latter of whom captures Asia to steal her Sacred Gear, Twilight Healing, which can heal not only humans, but devils and fallen angels. Issei and the gang attempt to stop Freed, and kill Raynare, however Asia dies from being separated from her Sacred Gear. Rias resurrects Asia as a devil and gives her the bishop position. She has her live with Issei, and they welcome her to the club with a party.
02	The Phoenix of the School Battle; Sentō Kōsha no Fenikkusu (戦闘校舎のフェニックス)	December 20, 2008; 978-4-8291-3358-3	January 26, 2021; 978-1-9753-1227-5
1. Life.0; 2. Life.1: "I Work as a Devil."; 3. Life.2: "I Pick a Fight."; 4. Life.3: "I Begin My Training."; 5. Life.4: "The Showdown Begins!"; 6. Life.5: "The Acclaimed Battle Continues!"; Checkmate.; End Game.; 7. Life. ∞ vs Power ∞: "I'm Here to Keep My Promise!"; fatherxfather.; Last kiss.; 8. New Life; 9. Afterwords
As Issei becomes acclimated to his new life as a Devil, Rias is confronted by her fiancée, Riser Phoenix. Rias does not wish to marry him, as their engagement was arranged by their families, but Riser wishes to go through with the engagement to add to his own harem, which Issei both admires and despises. They decide to hold a Rating Game to end the argument. After Issei and the rest of the club hold a training camp to power-up, they confront Riser's full team and lose. Issei decides to sacrifice a part of his body to Ddraig, the Dragon sealed inside of him, for a temporary power-up and confronts Riser again. Sabotaging Riser's immortality with a crucifix and holy water, Issei defeats him, annulling the engagement. Rias falls in love with him and decides to move into Issei's home.
03	Excalibur of the Moonlit Schoolyard; Gekkō Kōtei no Ekusukaribā (月光校庭のエクスカリバー)	April 20, 2009; 978-4-8291-3391-0	April 27, 2021; 978-1-9753-1229-9
1. Life.0; 2. Life.1: "Heat Up Occult Research Club!"; 3. Life.2: "The Holy Sword Has Arrived."; 4. Life.3: "The Plan to Destroy the Holy Sword!"; 5. Life.4: "Go! Occult Research Club!"; New Knight & New Rival.; 6. New Life; Friends.; 7. Afterwords
As the Occult Research Club decides to hold their meeting at Issei's home while the clubhouse undergoes renovation, Yuto Kiba finds an old photo containing the holy sword Excalibur, which brings back bitter memories of his past. Soon after, two battle nuns, Xenovia, and Irina Shido, who is also Issei's childhood friend, inform them that 3 of the 6 known Excalibur Swords have been stolen. Yuto meets Freed Sellzen again, wielding the stolen Excaliburs, and decides to leave the Club to pursue his revenge against the swords because his friends were killed needlessly from the Holy Sword Project at the hands of Valper Galilei. They soon learn that the Fallen Angel Kokabiel plans on combining the broken Excaliburs and using them to start another war. As the Club fight against Kokabiel, he tells them that in the previous war, not only were the Original Demon Kings killed, but also God, devastating Xenovia and Asia Argento. Meanwhile, as Yuto furiously fights Valper to exact revenge, he is reunited with the souls of his friends and his Sacred Gear, Sword Birth, reaches Balance Breaker and creates the Holy Demonic Swords, which was thought to be impossible. With Kokabiel as the only enemy left, the Club struggles to defeat him when the White Dragon Emperor suddenly appears, defeats Kokabiel easily and leaves with him. After the battle, Yuto returns to the Club and Xenovia, having been called a heretic for discovering the truth, joins them as Rias' knight.
04	Vampire of the Suspended Classroom; Kyōshitsu no Vanpaia (停止教室のヴァンパイア)	September 19, 2009; 978-4-8291-3427-6	July 20, 2021; 978-1-9753-1231-2
1. Life.0; 2. Life.1: "It's Summer! It's Swimsuits! I'm in Trouble!?"; 3. Life.2: "The Class Observation Begins."; 4. Life.3: "I Got a Junior (Boy)."; Grigori.1; 5. Life.4: "The VIP Meeting Begins!"; Khaos Brigade.; 6. Life.5: "The Welsh Dragon and the Vanishing Dragon"; Grigori.2; Valhalla.; 7. New Life.; 8. Special Life.; 9. Afterwords
As Issei continues his Devil Jobs, one of them reveals himself to be Azazel, the leader of Grigori. Azazel says that he has come for a Peace Summit between the Angels, Fallen Angels, and the Devils, which Rias confirms. When Sirzechs Lucifer comes to the club, he tells his sister that due to her achievements against Kokabiel, she is to unseal Gasper Valdi, whose Sacred Gear, Forbidden Balor View, was so uncontrollable that he had to be sealed. While Issei, Asia, and Xenovia were training Gasper, they meet Vali, the White Dragon Emperor, who says he is on the side of the Fallen Angels. Issei also receives the Dragon Slaying Holy Sword, Ascalon, from the Head Angel Michael, as a gift exchange between the factions. At the time of the summit, terrorists belonging to the Old Satan Faction overload Gasper's Sacred Gear to freeze time. Issei and Rias rescue Gasper, and release the time freeze, but as they defeat the terrorists, Vali turns on Azazel. He reveals that he is working with the Chaos Brigade, the terrorist organization led by Ophis the Infinity Dragon, and that his full name is Vali Lucifer, who has inherited the blood of the original Demon King Lucifer. Vali frustrates Issei, forcing the two to fight, with Issei gaining a part of Albion's power. As their fight becomes more intense, Bikou, a member of Vali's team, interrupts them and ends the fight. The summit ends with the Three Great Powers Alliance to fight the Chaos Brigade. Issei asks Michael to allow Asia and Xenovia to continue praying to God because they still have their Christian faith. Michael grants the wish, and Azazel becomes the adviser of the Occult Research Club to train their Sacred Gears.
05	Hellcat of the Underworld Training Camp; Mekai Gasshuku no Herukyatto (冥界合宿のヘルキャット)	December 19, 2009; 978-4-8291-3470-2	November 2, 2021; 978-1-9753-1233-6
1. Life.0; 2. Life.1: "It's Summer Break, let's GO to the Underworld!"; 3. Life.2: "The Young Devils Gathering!"; 4. Life.3: "The Cat and the Dragon!"; Odin.; 5. Life.4: "Club President vs. Student Council President: First Half!"; Waltz.; 6. Life.5: "Club President vs. Student Council President: Second Half!"; VIP.; End Game.; WINNER.; 7. Reunion.; 8. Afterwords
As summer vacation begins, Issei's house gets a hotel-like renovation from the Gremory's so that the Occult Research Club females can move in. The club decides to go to the Underworld, where it is revealed that there is going to be a Youth Rating Game Tournament. The Club members each gains special training, including Issei being trained by Tannin, a former Dragon King on the same level as Ddraig. After the training, Koneko Toujou meets her sister Kuroka, a stray Devil and a member of Vali's team, and tries to take her away. Issei and Rias arrive, and Issei finally reaches his true Balance Breaker, defeating Kuroka. Later, the first Youth Rating Game is between Rias' team and Sona Sitri's team. During the tournament, Issei reveals his newest technique, Bilingual, which allows him to hear women's breasts, but is defeated during the mid-game. The match ends with Rias' team winning the tournament, but the VIP goes to Genshiro Saji, who was able to defeat Issei during the game, and Koneko also starts developing feelings for Issei.
06	Holy Behind the Gymnasium; Taiikukan Ura no Hōrī (体育館裏のホーリー)	March 20, 2010; 978-4-8291-3500-6	February 8, 2022; 978-1-9753-1235-0
1. Life.0; 2. Life.1: "The Second Term Started!"; 3. Life.2: "Asia's Worries"; Asia.; BossXBoss.; 4. Life.3: "The Great Battle!"; Uroboros.; 5. Life.4: "I Love You"; Juggernaut Drive.; 6. Life.5: "The Great Red!"; Vali Lucifer.; Heroes.; 7. New Life; 8. Afterwords
With Kuoh's new semester starting, Irina Shido becomes a new member of the Occult Research Club as a representative of Heaven when she became a Reincarnated Angel. While the school gets ready for the sports festival, Rias' next opponent is revealed to be Diodora Astaroth. Diodora explains that he is the Devil Asia rescued, forcing her to be expelled from the Church. Diodora asks to trade Asia, but Rias refuses. On the day of the Rating Game, the Chaos Brigade attacks and Asia is kidnapped by Diodora, who is a member of the Chaos Brigade. Rias' team defeats Diodora's team, and rescues Asia from a device that would turn her healing powers into a bomb. However, Shalba Beelzebub of the Old Maou Faction, kills Diodora for his failure and casts Asia into the Dimensional Gap. Now frustrated, Issei activates his Juggernaut Drive and kills Shalba, when Vali arrives through the Dimensional Gap with a rescued Asia and returns her. With the help of the "Oppai Dragon Song" and Vali's halving abilities, they are able to restore Issei. Some time later, Issei and Asia compete in the three-legged race at Kuoh, and Asia reveals her true feelings to Issei.
07	Ragnarok After School; Hōkago no Ragunaroku (放課後のラグナロク)	July 17, 2010; 978-4-8291-3540-2	May 24, 2022; 978-1-9753-1237-4
1. Life.0; 2. Life.1: "Peace is the Best."; 3. Life.2: "The Shitty Geezer from the North Has Arrived"; 4. Life.3: "The Joint Army!"; Odin.; 5. Life.4: "The Two Heavenly Dragons vs. Evil God Loki!"; Surveillant.; Vali Lucifer.; BossXBoss.; 6. New Life; Dad; Heroes; 7. Afterwords
08	The Work of a Devil; Akuma no Oshigoto (アクマのおしごと)	December 18, 2010; 978-4-8291-3593-8	August 23, 2022; 978-1-9753-1239-8
1. Life.1: "The Work of a Devil"; 2. Life.2: "The Familiar's Requirements"; 3. Life.3: "Memories of Breasts"; 4. Life.4: "The Breasts of Tennis"; 5. Life.5: "Hell Teacher Azazel"; 6. Life.6: "300 Isseis"; 7. Extra Life: "The Fun Gremory Family"; 8. Afterwords
A series of short stories previously featured in Dragon Magazine.
09	Pandemonium at the School Trip; Shūgakuryokō wa Pandemoniumu (修学旅行はパンデモニウム)	April 20, 2011; 978-4-8291-3628-7	November 8, 2022; 978-1-9753-4381-1
1. Life.0; 2. Life.1: "Yeah, Let's Go to Kyoto!"; 3. Life.2: "Arrival at Kyoto"; 4. Life.3: "The Group of Heroes Has Arrived!"; 5. Life.4: "Showdown in Kyoto! Gremory Family vs. Hero Faction!"; Maven.; 6. New Life; BossXBoss.; Vali Lucifer.; Bael.; Heroes.; 7. Afterwords
10	Lion Heart of the School Festival; Gakuen Matsuri no Raion Hāto (学園祭のライオンハート)	September 17, 2011; 978-4-8291-3677-5	January 17, 2023; 978-1-9753-4814-4
1. Life.0; 2. Life.1: "Preparations for the School Festival!"; 3. Life.2: "A Maiden's Heart is Complicated"; 4. Life.3: "The Young Devils Showdown Begins!"; King.; 5. Life.4: "As a Servant of Rias Gremory"; Pawn.; 6. Life. "MAX VS Power. Red Dragon Emperor vs Lion King"; 7. Life. "MAXIMUM VS Power. Crimson and Red"; Emperor.; LION HEART.; Indra.; 8. New Life.; 9. Extra Life. "The Dream that Does Not Finish, and the Dream that Finishes"; 10. Afterwords
11	Ouroboros and Promotion Tests; Shunkyō Shiken to Uroborosu (進級試験とウロボロス)	January 20, 2012; 978-4-8291-3720-8	May 23, 2023; 978-1-9753-4816-8
1. Life.0; 2. Life.1: "Studying and Mating Season?"; 3. Life.2: "Infinity and the Mid-Class Devil Promotion Test!"; 4. Life.3: "The Rebellious Heroes"; 5. Life.4: "As a Heavenly Dragon"; 6. Life...; 7. Lost Life; 8. Afterwords
12	Heroes of Tutoring; Hoshūjukyō no Hīrōzu (補習授業のヒーローズ)	April 20, 2012; 978-4-8291-3749-9	November 21, 2023; 978-1-9753-5038-3
1. Life -3: "A Gremory Without a Red Dragon Emperor"; 2. Life -2: "Pal"; Dimension Boundary.; Satan.; 3. Life -1: "The Young Devil Alliance!"; 4. Life 0: "The Emperor of Bust Dragon."; 5. Life 1: "Crimson Promise"; Azazel.; Hero...?; 6. New Life; 7. Afterwords
13	Issei SOS; Issē Esu Ō Esu (イッセーSOS)	September 6, 2012 (w/BD edition); September 20, 2012 (regular ed.); 978-4-8291-9767-7 (w/BD ed.); 978-4-8291-3798-7 (regular ed.)	April 16, 2024; 978-1-9753-5040-6
1. Life.1: "A Tokusatsu Devil" (特撮の悪魔, Tokusatsu no Akuma); 2. Life.2: "Issei SOS" (イッセーSOS, Issē Esu Ō Esu); 3. Life.3: "The Disturbance of a Devil" (アクマのカクラン, Akuma no Kakuran); 4. Life.4: "The Unresurrected Phoenix" (蘇らない不死鳥(フェニックス), Yomigaranai Fenikkusu); 5. Life.5: "Armageddon at Sports Day!" (運動会でハルマゲドーン！, Undōkai de Harumagedōn!); 6. Extra Life. "The Worries of the Next-Next Heir" (次期次期当主さまのお悩み); 7. Afterwords
A compilation of short stories previously featured in Dragon Magazine. The limited edition includes a Blu-ray containing an OVA 13th episode from the anime series, written by Ichiei Ishibumi himself, and unique cover art.
14	Wizards of Career Counseling; Shinro-shidō no Wizādo (進路指導のウィザード)	January 19, 2013; 978-4-8291-3845-8	August 20, 2024; 978-1-9753-5042-0
1. Life.0; 2. Life.1: "I'm Also Doing a Devil Today"; Maverick Wizard.; 3. Life.2: "The Rulers of the Late-Night"; Wizard for Khaos Brigade.; 4. Life.3: "Stray Wizards"; 5. Life.4: "Go, Occult Research Club & Student Council!"; 6. New Life.; Romania; 7. Afterwords
15	The Dark Knight of Sunshine; Hidamari no Dāku Naito (陽だまりのダークナイト)	May 31, 2013 (w/BD edition.); June 20, 2013 (regular ed.); 978-4-8291-9768-4 (w/BD ed.); 978-4-0407-1004-4 (regular ed.)	December 10, 2024; 978-1-9753-5044-4
1. Episode Issei.1; Life.1: "Magical Girl Ria☆ For Real!?"; 2. Episode Issei.2; Life.2: "Scarlet and Crimson"; 3. Episode Issei.3; Life.3: "Holy☆Maiden Goes to the Holy-Land"; 4. Episode Issei.4; Life.4: "Lets Go with Training! ~Hell Chapter~"; 5. Episode Issei.5; 6. Episode Azazel.1; Life.5: "Wolf's Emblem"; 7. Episode Azazel.2; 8. Episode Yuuto.1; Life.6: "May the Shine be on You"; 9. Episode Yuuto.2; 10. Afterword
The limited edition includes a Blu-ray containing an OVA 14th episode from the anime series, written by Ichiei Ishibumi himself, and unique cover art.
16	Daywalker of the Extracurricular Lesson; Kagai Jugyō no Deiwōkā (課外授業のデイウォーカー)	October 19, 2013; 978-4-04-712912-2	May 20, 2025; 978-1-9753-5046-8
1. Life.0; 2. Life.1 Occult Research Club, to Romania!; 3. Life.2 The Kins of the Dark Night; 4. Life.3 Let's Have the Sunlight Together With Me; 5. Life.4 Rizevim Livan Lucifer(The Son of the Morning Star); 6. Gasper Balor.; 7. Life.D×D; 8. New Life.; 9. True Longinus.; 10. Afterword.
17	Valkyrie of the Teacher Training; Kyōin Kenshū no Warukyūre (教員研修のヴァルキリー)	February 20, 2014; 978-4-04-070031-1	November 11, 2025; 979-8-8554-1766-1
1. Life.0; 2. Life.1 Praises During the Training!; 3. Life.2 The School of the Underworld!; 4. Life.3 The Direction of the Evil Intent; 5. Life.4 The Youth Devil; 6. New Life.; 7. Brother?; 8. Emperor.; 9. Afterword.
18	Funny Angel of the Christmas Day; Seitansai no Fanīenjeru (聖誕祭のファニーエンジェル)	June 20, 2014; 978-4-04-070127-1	July 14, 2026; 979-8-8554-2206-1
1. Life.0; 2. Life.1 The Devils' Also Celebrates Christmas!; 3. Life.2 The Forbidden; 4. Life.3 D×D Also Launches To the Heaven; Fake Hero.; Joker.; 5. Life.4 Burn, Holy-sword!; 6. New Life.; Christmas.; Boss × Boss.; Ashes to ashes, Dust to dust.; 7. Afterword.
19	Durandal of the General Election; Sōsenkyo no Deyurandaru (総選挙のデュランダル)	November 20, 2014; 978-4-04-070146-2	November 10, 2026; 979-8-8554-2740-0
1. Rudra; 2. Life.0; 3. Life.1 Third Trimester Starts!; 4. Life.2 Various Decisive Battles!; 5. Life.3 Fist and Sword (Carnival); 6. New Life; To be continued...; Top Secret.; 7. Afterword
20	Belial of Career Consultation; Shinro Sōdan no Beriaru (進路相談のベリアル)	July 18, 2015; 978-4-04-070665-8	—
1. Faker; 2. Life.0; 3. Life.1 A Restless Career Consultation; Parents; 4. Life.2 The Truth of the Feast; To be infuriated.; 5. Life.3 Hyoudou Issei; 6. Last Life... Just Desserts; The Beast 666; Deterrence; 7. Afterword
21	Lucifer of the Optional Attendance; Jiyū Tōkō no Rushifā (自由登校のルシファー)	March 19, 2016; 978-4-04-070666-5	—
1. Encounter. White Dragon and Black Angel; Chaos Disaster; 2. Life.1 Amidst the Feast of the Imperial Beast/Trihexa; 3. Life. Ba'al Lion of the Great King —Great King—; 4. Life.2 Team [DxD] Attacks!; Determination; 5. Life. Lucifer Dawn of the Morning Star/Lucifer — Death Match —; 6. Last. DxD Crimson (深紅) and Crimson (真紅) — United Front —; 7. Eternal Life. Amidst the White Snow; Farewell Temporary; Y Ddraig Goch & Albion Gwiber; Report; The remaining hopes 8. Afterword
22	Gremory of the Graduation Ceremony; Sotsugyōshiki no Guremorī (卒業式のグレモリー)	July 20, 2016; 978-4-04-070965-9	—
1. Life.0; 2. Life.1 Those of us that were left behind!; 3. Life.2 And thus, to a High-class Devil; 4. Life.3 Gremory's Graduation Ceremony; It begins feast.; 5. Life.4 The Opening Ceremony of the Rating Game World Tournament, the "Azazel Cup"!; Team Members.; Indra & Sun Wukong; 6. Life.5 Go, the Sekiryuutei Team!; 7. New Life; 8. Afterword
23	Joker of the Ball Games; Kyūgi Taikai no Jōkā (球技大会のジョーカー)	March 18, 2017; 978-4-04-070963-5	—
1. Life.0; 2. Life.1 A [King] From Now On; 3. Life.2 Dragon Calls Dragon / Dragon Summons Dragon; 4. Life.3 Before the Decisive Battle; Upsetting sorcerer.1; Team member.; 5. Life.4 VS [Brave Saints] Begins!; Upsetting sorcerer.2 6. Life. Youth Because of this Youth; Each impression.; 1. Junior's preparation.; Interview.; 7. Next Life... And so, The Seating Battle Begins!; Singularity.; The Return of the King.; Vidar & Apollo.; Team member.; Nether world.; 8. Afterword
24	Grim Reaper of the Off-campus Learning; Kōgai Gakushū no Gurimu Rippā (校外学習のグリムリッパー)	November 17, 2017; 978-4-04-072378-5	—
25	Yggdrasil of the Summer Courses; Kaki Kōshū no Yugudorashiru (夏期講習のユグドラシル)	March 20, 2018; 978-4-04-072379-2	—

=== Shin High School DxD ===
No.	Title	Release date	ISBN
1	Welsh Dragon of the New School Term; Shin Gakki no Uēruzu Doragon (新学期のウェールズ・ドラゴン)	July 20, 2018	978-4-04-072825-4
2	Ruin Princess of the Proficiency Test; Jitsuryoku Shiken no Ruin Purinsesu (実力試験のルイン・プリンセス)	December 20, 2018	978-4-04-072826-1
3	Sun Shower of School Trip; Shūgakuryokō no San Shawā (修学旅行のサンシャワー)	August 20, 2019	978-4-04-072827-8
4	Kingdom of the Decisive Battle Study Abroad; Kessen Ryūgaku no Kingudamu (決戦留学のキングダム)	February 20, 2020	978-4-04-073547-4

=== High School DxD DX ===
No.	Title	Release date	ISBN
1	Love Song to the Reincarnated Angel; Tenshou Tenshi ni Rabusongu O (転生天使にラブソングを)	March 20, 2015	978-4-04-070332-9
2	Worship ☆ Dragon-God Girl; Matsu Re☆ryuujin Shoujo！ (マツレ☆龍神少女！)	December 19, 2015	978-4-04-070379-4
3	Cross x Crisis; Kurosu×Kuraishisu (クロス×クライシス)	November 19, 2016	978-4-04-070964-2
4	Student Council and Leviathan; Seitokai to Reviatan (生徒会とレヴィアタン)	July 20, 2017	978-4-04-072377-8
5	Superhero Trial; Supahiro Toraiaru (スーパーヒーロートライアル)	March 20, 2019	978-4-04-073163-6
6	Is the Order a Devil? Go Chūmon wa Akumadesu ka? (ご注文はアクマですか？)	March 19, 2021	978-4-04-074026-3
7	Ancestor is a Trickster!? Gosenzo-sama wa Torikkusutā!? (ご先祖さまはトリックスター!?)	March 19, 2022	978-4-04-074481-0
8	The Job of Special-Grade Demons; Tokkyū Akuma no Oshigoto (特級アクマのおしごと)	October 18, 2025	978-4-04-075895-4

=== High School DxD manga ===
No.	Original release date	Original ISBN	English release date	English ISBN
1	June 7, 2011	978-4-04-712733-3	May 27, 2014	978-0-316-40736-6
1. "I Quit Being Human." (人間、やめました。, Ningen, Yamemashita.); 2. "I Start as a Devil." (悪魔はじめました。, Akuma Hajimemashita.); 3. "I've Begun a Battle." (戦いはじめました。, Tatakai Hajimemashita.); 4. "I Found Someone to Protect." (守るもの、見つけました。, Mamoru Mono, Mitsukemashita.)
On his first date, Issei Hyodo is killed by Yuma Amano, a girl who sprouts black wings and stabs him in the abdomen with a spear of light. He wakes up the next day intact, assuming the incident to be a dream. However, when Issei is stabbed in the abdomen again by another winged creature, Rias Gremory, the school idol, intervenes, saying that Issei is her own. The next morning, Issei discovers he and Rias are naked together in bed. Reassuring that the dreams were real, Rias introduces herself as a devil and his new master. He is recruited to the Occult Research Club, where he meets the club members who are devil servants for Rias: school mascot girl Koneko Toujou, school prince Yuto Kiba, and "big sister" beauty Akeno Himejima. After dealing with an unusual contact, he befriends a newly transferred nun named Asia Argento, and later observes Rias's team take on a stray devil. He encounters a renegade priest Freed Sellzen but Asia tries to protect Issei as Rias's team retrieves him.
2	December 7, 2011	978-4-04-712767-8	August 26, 2014	978-0-316-37682-2
5. "I Made a Friend." (友達、できました。, Tomodachi, Dekimashita.); 6. "I Will Protect My Friend." (友達、守ります。, Tomodachi, Mamorimasu.); 7. "I'm Saving My Friend." (友達、救います。, Tomodachi, Sukuimasu.); 8. "I Defeat an Angel." (天使、倒します!, Tenshi, Taoshimasu!); 9. "Off You Go, Damn Angel!" (吹っ飛べ、クソ天使!, Futtobe, Kuso Tenshi!); 10. "I Start a New Life." (New Life はじめます。, New Life Hajimemasu.)
Issei and Asia go on a date, where Asia shares her background story. Yuma Amano, who reveals herself to be the fallen angel Raynare, captures Asia. Despite Rias's warnings not to fight the fallen angels, Issei tries to rescue Asia and gets help from Koneko and Yuta. They battle Freed and cause him to retreat; however they are too late to save Asia, as she dies from having her Sacred Gear for healing removed and stolen by Raynare. After Issei defeats Raynare, Rias revives Asia as a devil using her bishop piece. She has her live with Issei, and the club welcomes her with a party.
3	July 5, 2012	978-4-04-712814-9	November 18, 2014	978-0-316-33482-2
11. "I Became a Devil." (悪魔、やってます。, Akuma, Yattemasu.); 12. "I'll Do My Best at Work." (お仕事、頑張ります。, Oshigoto, Ganbarimasu.); 13. "I'll Do My First Sexual Experience!?" (初体験、しちゃいます!?, Shotaiken, shi Chaimasu!?); 14. "I Pick a Fight." (喧嘩、売ります!, Kenka, Urimasu!); 15. "I'll Make a Grandchild!?" (初孫、つくります!?, Hatsumago, Tsukurimasu!?); 16. "I've Begun My Training!" (修行、はじめます!, Shugyō, Hajimemasu!); 16.5. "I'll Serve Under Him!?"
4	January 7, 2013	978-4-04-712852-1	February 15, 2015	978-0-316-37682-2
17. "The Real Battle Begins!" (決戦、始まります!, Kessen, Hajimarimasu!); 18. "I'll Enchant You With My Finishing Technique!" (必殺技、魅せます!, Hissawwaza, Misemasu!); 19. "Combine the Power of the Two!" (二人の力、合わせます!, Futari no Chikara, Awasemasu!); 20. "I Can Still...Fight!" (まだ...戦えます!, Mada... Tatakaemasu!); 21. "I'll Take Prez Back!" (部長、取り戻します!, Buchō, Torimodoshimasu!); 22. "I'll Blow Away the Immortal Bird!" (不死鳥、ブッ飛ばします!, Fushichō, Buttobashimasu!); 22.5. "I Start a New Life"
5	September 9, 2013	978-4-04-712900-9	May 19, 2015	978-0-316-25884-5
23. "Heat up, Occult Research Club!" (燃えろ、オカルト研究部!, Moero, Okaruto Kenkyū-bu!); 24. "We'll beat you with our teamwork!" (チームワークで、戦います!, Chīmu Wāku de, Tatakaimasu!); 25. "I'll Draw Out the Aura of the Dragon?" (龍の気、抜き出します!?, Ryū no Ki, Nukidashimasu!?); 26. "These Bloodbath Types, I'll Live Through Them!" (ド修羅場、斬り抜けます!, Do Shuraba, Kiri Nukemasu!); 27. "An Intense Battle of the Demonic Sword vs. Holy Sword!" (魔剣VS聖剣、激闘です!, Maken VS Seiken, Gekitōdesu!); 28. "The Plan to Destroy the Holy Sword!" (聖剣破壊計画です!, Seiken Hakai Keikakudesu!); 28.5. "The Plan to Destroy the Holy Sword"
6	April 9, 2014	978-4-04-070080-9	August 18, 2015	978-0-31-629854-4
29. "A Devil's Punishment? Please Forgive Me!" (アクマのおしおき!?ゴメンなさい!, Akuma no Oshioki!? Gomen'nasai!); 30. "Becoming a Perverted Demon?!" (なります!?エッチな悪魔!, Narimasu!? Etchina Akuma!); 31. "Occult Research Club, Move Out!" (行け!オカルト研究部!, Ike! Okaruto Kenkyū-bu!); 32. "Hell's Gatekeeper Will Perish!" (地獄の番犬、退治します!, Jigoku no Banken, Taiji Shimasu!); 33. "A Fierce Battle! Vs. Archnemesis Freed!" (激闘! vs宿敵フリード!, Gekitō! Vs Shukuteki Furīdo!); 34. "Burn On! Lechery & Fervor!!" (燃えます! エロ&熱血!!, Moemasu! Ero & Nekketsu!!); 35. "New Knight & New Rival"; 35.5. "Friends"
7	December 9, 2014	978-4-04-070457-9	November 17, 2015	978-0-31-630946-2
36. "A Battleground For Girls!?" (浴槽=乙女の戦場です!?, Yokusō = Otome no Senjōdesu!?); 37. "Summer! Swimsuits! Strife!?" (夏です! 水着です! ピンチです!?, Natsudesu! Mizugidesu! Pinchidesu!?); 38. "Baby Making! A Bit Early for That!?" (子作り! 早すぎます!?, Ko Tsukuri! Haya Sugimasu!?); 39. "Parents' Day Commences." (授業参観、始まります。, Jugyō Sankan, Hajimarimasu.); 40. "Devil King Leviathan-Sama Descends!" (魔王レヴィアたんさま、降臨です!, Maō Reviatan-sama, Kōrindesu!); 41. "I Got Myself A (Male) Kouhai." (後輩(男)、できました。, Kōhai (Otoko), Dekimashita.)
8	August 8, 2015	978-4-04-070597-2	April 26, 2016	978-0-31-631496-1
42. "I'll Handle My (Male) Kouhai!!" (後輩(男)、なんとかします!!, Kōhai (Otoko), Nantoka Shimasu!!); 43. "I Get The "Dragon Slayer"!?" ("龍殺し"、頂きます!?, "Ryū Koroshi", Itadakimasu!?); 44. "The Top Conference Begins!" (トップ会談始まります!, Toppu Kaidan Hajimarimasu!); 45. "It's An Emergency!? I'll Head Out Too!!" (緊急事態!? 俺も行きます!!, Kinkyū Jitai!? Ore mo Ikimasu!!); 46. "Khaos Brigade"; 47. "View x Dress Break - The Ultimate Tag Team!?" (邪眼×洋服崩壊最強タッグ結成です!?, Yokoshima me × Yōfuku Hōkai Saikyō Taggu Kesseidesu!?); 48. "Red Dragon and White Dragon" (赤い龍と白い龍!, Akai Ryū to Shiroi Ryū!); 49. "Fists of Rage Clash!!" (怒りの拳、ぶつけます!!, Ikari no Ken, Butsukemasu!!)
9	May 9, 2016	978-4-04-070881-2	August 22, 2017	978-0-31-647478-8
50. "New Life & Special Life"; 51. "The Wait is Over! Diving into Summer Vacation!!" (待望! 夏休み突入です!!, Taibō! Natsuyasumi Totsunyūdesu!!); 52. "Off to the Devil Realm!!" (旅立ち、冥界へGO!!, Tabidachi, Meikai e GO!!); 53. "Uncharted Territory!? The Gremory Residence!!" (未知の世界!? グレモリー邸です!!, Michi no Sekai!? Guremorī-Teidesu!!); 54. "Young Devils, Assemble!" (若手悪魔、集合です!, Wakate Akuma, Shūgōdesu!); 55. "Paradise!? The Knockout "Sandwich"!" (桃源郷!? 悶絶"サンドイッチ"です!, Tōgenkyō!? Monzetsu "sandoitchi" desu!); 56. "A Surprising "Sensei" Appears!" (驚愕の"先生"登場です!, Kyōgaku no "Sensei" Tōjōdesu!); 57. "The Hellish Training Continues!" (地獄の特訓、続きます!, Jigoku no Tokkun, Tsudzukimasu!); 58. "Overcome That Hurdle! I...Wanna Get Stronger!!" (壁を超えろ! 強く...なりたいんです!!, Kabe o Koero! Tsuyoku... Naritai ndesu!!)
10	May 9, 2017	978-4-04-072282-5	December 19, 2017	978-0-31-641406-7
59. "Training Complete! Reunited with Friends!!" (修行完了! 仲間と再会です!!, Shugyō Kanryō! Nakama to Saikaidesu!!); 60. "Full Speed Ahead Toward our Dreams!!" (夢に向かって! 全力です!!, Yume ni Mukatte! Zenryokudesu!!); 61. "Heart-Pounding and Shocking? A Double Reunion!" (トキメキ&衝撃? ふたつの"再会"です!, Tokimeki & Shōgeki? Futatsu no "Saikai" desu!); 62. "Cat and Dragon!" (猫とドラゴン!, Neko to Doragon!); 63. "Right or Left!? Doorbells of Fate!!" (右or左!? 運命のブザーです!!, Migi or Hidari!? Unmei no Buzādesu!!); 64. "From Out of Nowhere! The Worst Kind of Red Dragon Emperor!!" (爆誕! "やらしい"赤龍帝です!!, Bakutan! "Yarashī" Akaryū Teidesu!!); 65. "Fierce Battle! Kuroka vs. Red Dragon Emperor!!" (激闘! 黒歌VS赤龍帝!!, Gekitō! Kuroka VS Akaryū tei!!); 66. "Attack! Ultimate Holy Blade!!" (襲来! 最強の聖剣です!!, Shūrai! Saikyō no Seikendesu!!); 67. "Odin"
11	April 9, 2018	978-4-04-072669-4	November 13, 2018	978-1-97-532807-8
68. "President VS. Council President-The Battle's First Half! (Part 1)" (部長VS会長 前半戦! 1, Buchō VS Kaichō Zenpansen! 1); 69. "President VS. Council President-The Battle's First Half! (Part 2)" (部長VS会長 前半戦! 2, Buchō VS Kaichō Zenpansen! 2); 70. "President VS. Council President-The Battle's First Half! (Part 3)" (部長VS会長 前半戦! 3, Buchō VS Kaichō Zenpansen! 3); 71. "President VS. Council President-The Battle's First Half! (Part 4)" (部長VS会長 前半戦! 4, Buchō VS Kaichō Zenpansen! 4); 72. "Waltz"; 73. "President VS. Council President-The Battle's Second Half! (Part 1)" (部長VS会長 後半戦! 1, Buchō VS Kaichō Kōhan-sen! 1); 74. "President VS. Council President-The Battle's Second Half! (Part 2)" (部長VS会長 後半戦! 2, Buchō VS Kaichō Kōhan-sen! 2); 75. "President VS. Council President-The Battle's Second Half! (Part 3)" (部長VS会長 後半戦! 3, Buchō VS Kaichō Kōhan-sen! 3); 76. "Winner"

== See also ==
- Ichiei Ishibumi
- Characters
- Episodes
