= Ichiei Ishibumi =

Japanese novelist (born 1981)

- 石踏 一榮
- Born: April 25, 1981 (age 45); Chiba Prefecture, Japan
- Occupation: Novelist
- Writing career
- Years active: 2006-present
- Notable work: High School DxD

Ichiei Ishibumi (石踏 一榮, Ishibumi Ichiei; born April 25, 1981) is a Japanese novelist best known for his light novel series High School DxD.

== Career ==
In 2005, Ishibumi received a special prize in the 17th Fantasia Awards hosted by Fujimi Shobo for the light novel Denpachi that he submitted. He made his debut with that novel when it was published in 2006 as a tankōbon. The same year, he published his second light novel Slash/Dog. Two years later, in 2008, he began publishing the light-novel series High School DxD, with 25 volumes published as well as an additional 4 volumes of a sequel series, Shin High School DxD. The series has been adapted into multiple manga and anime television series. While preparing the light novels, his father died.

== Bibliography ==
=== Early works ===
- Denpachi (2006)
- Slash/Dog (2006)
  - Daten no Inugami -SLASHDØG- (堕天の狗神 -SLASHDØG-) (Revamped of original series, 2014)
  - Daten no Inugami -SLASHDØG2- (堕天の狗神 -SLASHDØG2-) (2018)

=== High School DxD series ===
1. Diabolos of the Old School Building (旧校舎のディアボロス, Kyūkōsha no Diaborosu) (2008)
2. Phoenix of the Battle School (戦闘校舎のフェニックス, Sentō Kōsha no Fenikkusu) (2008)
3. Excalibur of the Moonlit Schoolyard (月光校庭のエクスカリバー, Gekkō Kōtei no Ekusukaribā) (2009)
4. Vampire of the Suspended Classroom (停止教室のヴァンパイア, Teishi Kyōshitsu no Vuanpaia) (2009)
5. Hellcat of the Underworld Training Camp (冥界合宿のヘルキャット, Mekai Gasshuku no Herukyatto) (2009)
6. Holy Behind the Gymnasium (体育館裏のホーリー, Taiikukan ura no hōrī) (2010)
7. Ragnarok After School (7 放課後のラグナロク, Hōkago no Ragunaroku) (2010)
8. The Work of a Devil (8 アクマのおしごと, Akuma no Oshigoto) (2010)
9. Pandemonium at the School Trip (修学旅行はパンデモニウム, Shūgakuryokō wa Pandemoniumu) (2011)
10. Lion Heart of the School Festival (学園祭のライオンハート, Gakuen Matsuri no Raionhāto) (2011)
11. Ouroboros and Promotion Tests (進級試験とウロボロス, Shunkyō Shiken to Uroborosu) (2012)
12. Heroes of Tutoring (補習授業のヒーローズ, Hoshūjukyō no Hīrōzu) (2012)
13. Issei SOS (イッセーSOS, Issē Esu Ō Esu) (2012)
14. Wizards of Career Counseling (進路指導のウィザード, Shinro-shidō no Wizādo) (2013)
15. Dark Knight of Sunshine (陽だまりのダークナイト, Hidamari no Dākunaito) (2013)
16. Daywalker of the Extracurricular Lesson (課外授業のデイウォーカー, Kagai Jugyō no Deiuōkā) (2013)
17. Valkyrie of the Teacher Training (教員研修のヴァルキリー, Kyōin Kenshū no Vuarukirī) (2014)
18. Funny Angel of the Christmas Day (聖誕祭のファニーエンジェル, Seitansai no Fanīenjeru) (2014)
19. Durandal of the General Election (総選挙のデュランダル, Sōsenkyo no Deyurandaru) (2014)
20. Belial of Career Consultation (進路相談のベリアル, Shinro Sōdan no Beriaru) (2015)
21. Lucifer of the Optional Attendance (自由登校のルシファー, Jiyū Tōkō no Rushifā) 2016
22. Gremory of the Graduation Ceremony (卒業式のグレモリー, Sotsugyōshiki no Guremorī) 2016
23. Joker of the Ball Games (球技大会のジョーカー, Kyūgi Taikai no Jōkā) 2017
24. Grim Reaper of the Off-campus Learning (キャンパス外学習の恐ろしい刈り取り師ー, Kyanpasu-gai gakushū no osoroshī karitori-shi) 2017
25. Yggdrasil of the Summer Courses (夏期講習のユグドラシル, Kaki kōshū no yugudorashiru) 2018

A Continuation of the series

Shin High School DxD

Welsh Dragon of the New School Term Shin Gakki no Uēruzu Doragon (新学期のウェールズ・ドラゴン) Ruin Princess of the Proficiency Test Jitsuryoku Shiken no Ruin Purinsesu (実力試験のルイン・プリンセス) Sun Shower of School Trip Shūgakuryokō no San Shawā (修学旅行のサンシャワー) Kingdom of the Decisive Battle Study Abroad Kessen Ryūgaku no Kingudamu (決戦留学のキングダム)

To accommodate the growing number of short stories published, a series of light novels, the DX series, that acts as a compilation was created.

1. DX.1 Love Song to the Reincarnated Angel (DX.1 転生天使にラブソングを, DX.1 Tensei Tenshi ni Rabu Song wo) (2015)
2. DX.2 Worship☆Dragon-God Girl! (DX.2 マツレ☆龍神少女!, DX.2 Matsure ☆ Ryūjin Shōjo!) (2015)
3. DX.3 Cross×Crisis (DX.3 クロス×クライシス, DX.3 Kurosu × Kuraishisu) (2016)
4. DX.4 Student Council and Leviathan (DX.4 生徒会とレヴィアタン, DX.4 Seito-kai to Revuiatan) (2017)
5. DX.5 Superhero Trial (DX.5 スーパーヒーロートライアル, DX.5 Supahiro Toraiaru) (2019)
6. DX.6 Is the Order a Devil? (DX.6 ご注文はアクマですか？, DX.6 Go Chūmon wa Akumadesu ka?) (2021)
7. DX.7 Ancestor is a Trickster!? (DX7. ご先祖さまはトリックスター!?, DX.7 Gosenzo-sama wa Torikkusutā!?) (2022)
- Fantasia Bunko 25th Anniversary Book (ファンタジア文庫25周年アニバーサリーブック, Fantajia bunko 25-shūnen Anibāsarī Bukku) (18 March 2013)

== See also ==
- High School DxD characters
- High School DxD episodes
- High School DxD light novels
