= Survival in Another World with My Mistress! =

Japanese light novel series

- First light novel volume cover

ご主人様とゆく異世界サバイバル！ (Goshujinsama to Yuku Isekai Sabaibaru!)
- Genre: Fantasy; Isekai; Survival
- Novel series
- Written by: Ryūto
- Published by: Shōsetsuka ni Narō
- Original run: August 17, 2018 – present
- Light novel
- Written by: Ryūto
- Illustrated by: Yappen
- Published by: Micro Magazine
- English publisher: NA: Seven Seas Entertainment
- Imprint: GC Novels
- Original run: May 30, 2019 – present
- Volumes: 10
- Manga
- Written by: Ryūto
- Illustrated by: SASAYUKi
- Published by: Micro Magazine
- English publisher: NA: Seven Seas Entertainment
- Imprint: Ride Comics
- Magazine: Comic Ride
- Original run: March 30, 2020 – present
- Volumes: 9

Survival in Another World with My Mistress! (ご主人様とゆく異世界サバイバル！, Goshujinsama to Yuku Isekai Sabaibaru!) is a Japanese light novel series written by Ryūto and illustrated by Yappen. It began serialization on the user-generated novel publishing website Shōsetsuka ni Narō in August 2018. It was later acquired by Micro Magazine who began publishing the series under their GC Novels imprint in May 2019. A manga adaptation illustrated by SASAYUKi began serialization in Micro Magazine's Comic Ride online magazine in March 2020.

== Plot ==
Avid video gamer Kousuke Shibata, who is a fan of a game similar to Minecraft, abruptly wakes up in the forest of a fantasy world. He finds he has abilities equivalent to his favorite game, like crafting items and storing them. After surviving for a while, a dark elf named Sylphyel Danal Merinard finds and attacks him for being human since a human supremacist kingdom destroyed her homeland, forcing elves and other creatures to become refugees who gather in a village. After he convinces her he is not from the kingdom and demonstrates his abilities, she enslaves him to grant him protection from the other refugees and to make use of his abilities. He quickly impresses the other refugees with his abilities, which have nothing to do with magic, and slowly improves their quality of life.

== Media ==
=== Light novel ===
Written by Ryūto, Survival in Another World with My Mistress! began serialization on the user-generated novel publishing website Shōsetsuka ni Narō on August 17, 2018. It was later acquired by Micro Magazine who began publishing it with illustrations by Yappen under their GC Novels light novel imprint on May 30, 2019. Ten volumes have been released as of November 29, 2025. The series is licensed in English by Seven Seas Entertainment.

No.	Original release date	Original ISBN	North American release date	North American ISBN
1	May 30, 2019	978-4-89637-885-6	March 10, 2022 (digital); May 3, 2022 (print)	978-1-64827-892-1
2	June 29, 2019	978-4-89637-894-8	April 14, 2022 (digital); July 5, 2022 (print)	978-1-64827-893-8
3	November 30, 2019	978-4-89637-943-3	October 6, 2022 (digital); November 8, 2022 (print)	978-1-64827-894-5
4	April 30, 2020	978-4-86716-004-6	January 26, 2023 (digital); February 28, 2023 (print)	978-1-64827-895-2
5	January 30, 2021	978-4-86716-108-1	April 13, 2023 (digital); May 2, 2023 (print)	978-1-63858-993-8
6	September 20, 2021	978-4-86716-175-3	June 22, 2023 (digital); July 18, 2023 (print)	978-1-68579-635-8
7	March 29, 2024	978-4-86716-556-0	October 24, 2024 (digital); November 19, 2024 (print)	978-1-68579-656-3
8	November 29, 2024	978-4-86716-672-7	July 31, 2025 (digital); August 26, 2025 (print)	979-8-89373-277-1
9	May 30, 2025	978-4-86716-767-0	March 12, 2026 (digital); April 14, 2026 (print)	979-8-89765-217-4
10	November 29, 2025	978-4-86716-876-9	September 24, 2026 (digital); November 3, 2026 (print)	979-8-89863-238-0
11	October 30, 2026	978-4-82500-062-9	—	—

=== Manga ===
A manga adaptation illustrated by SASAYUKi began serialization in Micro Magazine's Comic Ride online magazine on March 30, 2020. The manga's chapters have been compiled into nine tankōbon volumes as of August 2025. The manga adaptation is also licensed in English by Seven Seas Entertainment.

No.	Original release date	Original ISBN	North American release date	North American ISBN
1	September 30, 2020	978-4-86716-061-9	May 3, 2022	978-1-64827-891-4
2	April 27, 2021	978-4-86716-130-2	August 9, 2022	978-1-63858-628-9
3	November 29, 2021	978-4-86716-703-8	December 27, 2022	978-1-63858-853-5
4	July 28, 2022	978-4-86716-317-7	June 20, 2023	978-1-68579-598-6
5	March 31, 2023	978-4-86716-405-1	January 9, 2024	979-8-88843-107-8
6	October 31, 2023	978-4-86716-486-0	August 27, 2024	979-8-89160-489-6
7	June 27, 2024	978-4-86716-589-8	March 25, 2025	979-8-89373-275-7
8	January 31, 2025	978-4-86716-703-8	October 21, 2025	979-8-89561-582-9
9	August 28, 2025	978-4-86716-819-6	May 26, 2026	979-8-89765-387-4
10	May 28, 2026	978-4-86716-968-1	March 30, 2027	979-8-89863-156-7

== See also ==
- Reborn as a Space Mercenary, another light novel series with the same writer
- Welcome to Japan, Ms. Elf!, another light novel series with the same illustrator
