= Comfort You =

Comfort You may refer to:

- "Comfort You", song by Van Morrison from Veedon Fleece 1974
- "Comfort You", song by Cyndi Lauper from Shine (Cyndi Lauper album)
- "Comfort You", song by Eskimo Joe from Black Fingernails, Red Wine 2006
- "Comfort You", song by Letters from the Fire from Letters from the Fire (album)
