= Worth the Pain =

Studio album by Letters from the Fire
- Released: September 9, 2016
- Recorded: 2015
- Genre: Hard rock
- Length: 50:14
- Label: Sand Hill Records
- Producer: Kile Odell

Letters from the Fire chronology
Letters from the Fire (EP) (2014)	Worth the Pain (2016)	Letters from the Fire (2018)

Worth the Pain is the debut studio album by American hard rock band Letters from the Fire. Released on 9 September 2016, the work was published via Sand Hill Records.

== Background ==
In May 2016, the ensemble added a new female vocalist by the name of Alexa Kabazie before broadcasting the music video for "Give In to Me", the very first single from the album. On September 9, 2016, the ensemble released the work, produced by Kile Odell. In December 2016, the ensemble released videos for both "Control" and "Worth the Pain", two tunes from the album.

== Critical reception ==
The album is portrayed by Larry Petro of American radio station KNAC as "Evanescence meets Lacuna Coil (sans the unclean singing) with the heavy backbone of Disturbed".

== Track listing ==
No.	Title	Length
1.	"Perfect Life"	4:12
2.	"Mother Misery"	3:37
3.	"Give In to Me"	3:38
4.	"Bruised"	4:21
5.	"Live a Lie"	3:52
6.	"My Angel"	4:09
7.	"Last December"	3:39
8.	"Holy Ghost"	3:48
9.	"At War"	4:25
10.	"Control"	4:00
11.	"Worth the Pain"	3:47
12.	"Scars"	3:35
13.	"One Foot in the Grave"	3:11
Total length:		50:14

== Personnel ==
- Alexa Kabazie – vocals
- Mike Keller – rhythm guitar
- Cameron Stucky – lead guitar
- Clayton Wages – bass
- Ben Anderson - drums

== Charts ==
=== Album ===
Chart (2016)	Peak position
US Heatseekers Albums	18
US Hard Rock Albums	18

=== Singles ===
Title	Year	Peak chart positions	
Title	Year	US Main. Rock	US Active Rock
"Give In to Me"	2016	33	-
"Worth the Pain"	2016	24	23
