= Emily Neves =

American voice actress

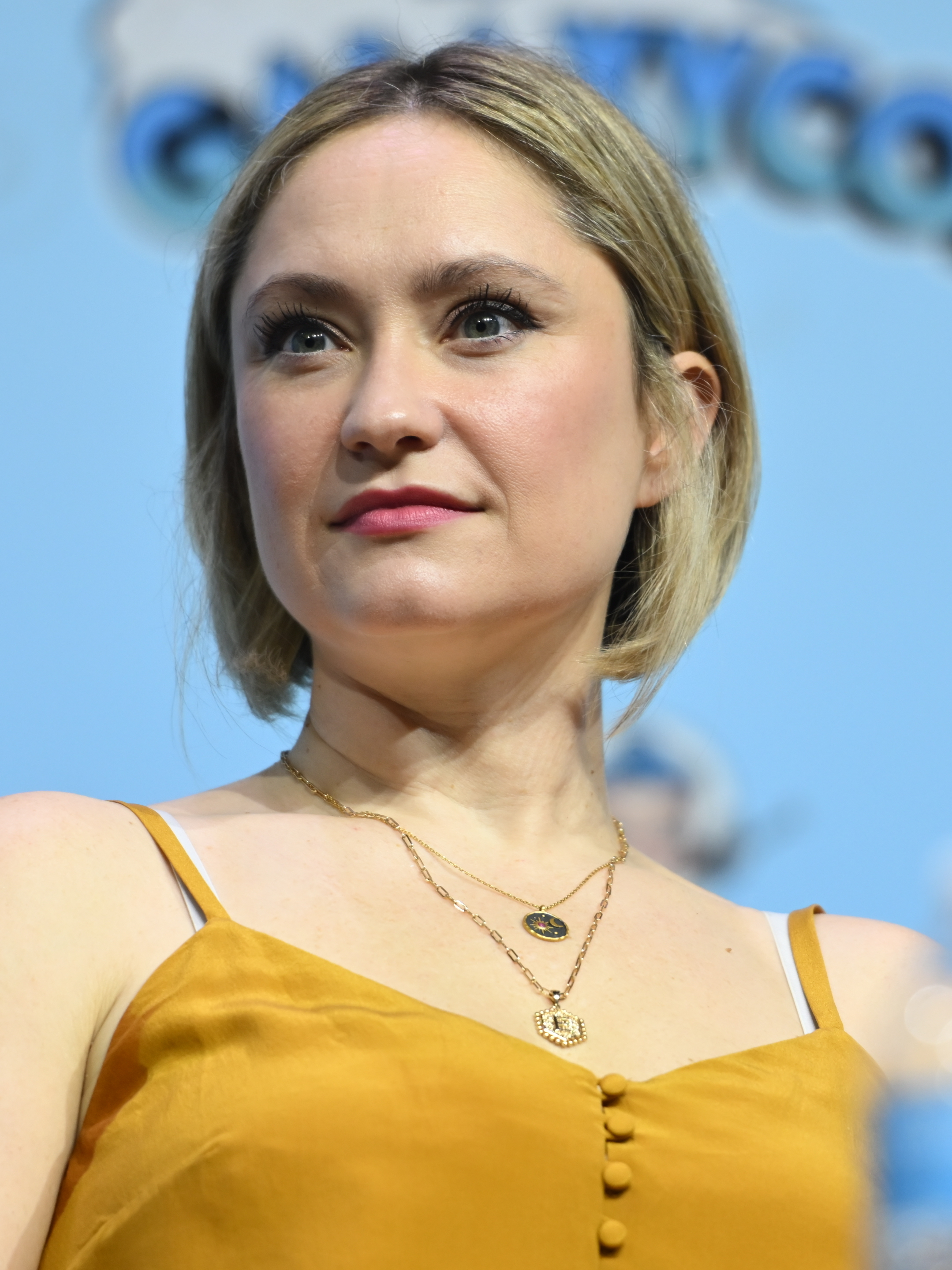
- Neves in 2023
- Born: Houston, Texas, U.S.
- Education: Texas State University
- Occupation: Voice actress
- Years active: 2008–present
- Spouse: Andrew Love (m. 2011; div. 2014)
- Partner: David Matranga

Emily Neves is an American voice actress known for her contributions to the English dubbing of Japanese anime series and video games. Some of her major voice roles include Kotomi Ichinose in Clannad, Kanade "Angel" Tachibana in Angel Beats, Minene Uryu in Future Diary, Yuuko Kanoe in Dusk Maiden of Amnesia, Chelsea in Akame ga Kill!, Angelise Ikaruga Misurugi in Cross Ange, Eri from My Hero Academia, Toriko Nishina in Otherside Picnic, Ayase Shinomiya in Guilty Crown, Sheffield in Azur Lane, Umaru Doma in Himouto! Umaru-chan and Lammis in Reborn as a Vending Machine, I Now Wander the Dungeon.

== Biography ==
Neves was born in Houston, Texas. Her interest in acting began at age 12 when she performed for the first time in a theater production of West Side Story at a local performing arts camp. She attended James E. Taylor High School in Katy, Texas, where she performed as a soprano in the school's choir. During her junior year, she participated in the University of South Florida's Broadway Theatre Project and worked with the program's founding director Ann Reinking alongside Patti Lupone, Ben Vereen and Gwen Verdon, with Neves mentioning she was in "one of [Verdon's] last dance classes." After finishing high school in 2000, she attended Texas State University in San Marcos as a drama and acting major.

In early 2005, she competed in the fourth season of the Fox reality singing competition American Idol, advancing from the Las Vegas auditions to the Hollywood round, where she was eliminated.

Neves began her voice acting career in 2008 after attending an anime audition. Her debut anime role was a bit part in Kiba.

She was a resident stage actress at the Alley Theatre in Houston.

== Personal life ==
Neves married fellow voice actor Andrew Love in 2011. In 2015, she stated on her Twitter that they had amicably divorced. Since 2020, she has been in an ongoing relationship with voice actor David Matranga.

== Filmography ==
=== Anime ===
List of voice performances in anime
Year	Title	Role	Notes	Ref(s)
2010	Clannad	Kotomi Ichinose		
2010	Legends of the Dark King	Reina		
2011	Angel Beats!	Kanade "Angel" Tachibana		
2011	The Guin Saga	Rinda		
2011	Clannad After Story	Kotomi Ichinose		
2012	Princess Resurrection	Reiri Kamura		
2012	Majikoi - Oh! Samurai Girls	Yukie Mayuzumi/Matsukaze		
2012	Dusk Maiden of Amnesia	Yuko Kanoe		
2012–13	Hiiro no Kakera	Tamaki Kasuga		
2012–13	AKB0048	Chieri Sono		
2012–15	Love, Chunibyo & Other Delusions	Kumin Tsuyuri	Voice Director	
2013	Future Diary	Minene Uryuu (9th)		
2013	Guilty Crown	Ayase Shinomiya		
2013	Kokoro Connect	Yui Kiriyama		
2013	Nakaimo - My Sister is Among Them!	Mana Tendou, others		
2013	Say I Love You	Megumi Kitagawa		
2013	Girls und Panzer	Nozomi Konparu/Pazomi, Kei		
2013	Nyan Koi!	Kotone Kirishima		
2014	MM!	Arashiko Yuno		
2014	Upotte!!	Sig (SG550)		
2014	From the New World	Saki Watanabe		
2014	Hakkenden: Eight Dogs of the East	Hamaji		
2014	WataMote	Yū Naruse	Voice director	
2014	Rozen Maiden Zurückspulen	Megu Kakizaki	Voice director	
2014	Sunday Without God	Ulla Eulesse Hecmatica		
2014	Log Horizon	Lenissa Erhart Cowen, Mischa		
2014	The Ambition of Oda Nobuna	Oda Nobuna		
2015	Dog & Scissors	Momiji Himehagi	Voice director	
2015	Maid Sama!	Minako Ayuzawa, others	Voice director	
2015	Daimidaler: Prince vs Penguin Empire	Kyoko Sonan		
2015	Akame ga Kill!	Chelsea		
2015	Brynhildr in the Darkness	Kazumi Schlierenzauer		
2016	Another	Takako Sugiura		
2016	Cross Ange	Angelise Ikaruga Misurugi		
2017	Himouto! Umaru-chan	Umaru Doma		
2017	Monster Musume	Doppel		
2017–25	My Hero Academia	Sirius, Eri		
2018	Darling in the Franxx	Mitsuru (childhood)		
2018	High School DxD Hero	Kuisha Abaddon		
2018	Magical Girl Raising Project	Ruler		
2018	Steins;Gate 0	Judy Reyes	Script writer	
2018–25	Kakuriyo: Bed and Breakfast for Spirits	Aoi Tsubaki, Ai		
2019	Hensuki: Are You Willing to Fall in Love with a Pervert, as Long as She's a Cutie?	Mizuha Kiryū		
2019	Nichijou	Mihoshi Tachibana		
2019–21	Fruits Basket	Mio Yamagishi		
2019–present	That Time I Got Reincarnated as a Slime	Chloe Aubert / Chronoa		
2020	Black Clover	Undine		
2020	The Demon Girl Next Door	Lilith		
2020	Super HxEros	Momoka Momozono		
2020	Our Last Crusade or the Rise of a New World	Aliceliese Lou Nebulis IX		
2020	By the Grace of the Gods	Ryoma Takebayashi		
2021	Sakura Wars the Animation	Elise		
2021	Tamayomi	Nozomi Nakamura		
2021	Wandering Witch: The Journey of Elaina	Estelle		
2021	Combatants Will Be Dispatched!	Black Lilith		
2021	SSSS.Dynazenon	Mei		
2021	Moriarty the Patriot	William James Moriarty (young)		
2021	Otherside Picnic	Toriko Nishina		
2021–present	Mushoku Tensei	Sylphiette		
2022	Call of the Night	Midori Kohakobe		
2023	Reborn as a Vending Machine, I Now Wander the Dungeon	Lammis		
2024	After-School Hanako-kun	Akane Aoi	Season 2	
2025	One Piece	Ginny		
2025	May I Ask for One Final Thing?	Terenezza		
2026	Roll Over and Die	Flum Apricot		
2026	A Misanthrope Teaches a Class for Demi-Humans	Sui Usami		
2026	Tamon's B-Side	Yamato Kinoshita		
2026	Witch Hat Atelier	Tartah		
2026	Daemons of the Shadow Realm	Iori Shingo		
2026	The World Is Dancing	Shirabyoshi		
2026	Reborn as a Space Mercenary	Mimi		

=== Film ===
List of voice performances in direct-to-video, feature and television films
Year	Title	Role	Notes	Ref(s)
2010	Halo Legends	Cal-141 (Note: Referred to merely as "Spartan" in credits)	The Babysitter	
2012	Broken Blade	Sigyn Erster		
2012	Un-Go	Inga	Un-Go episode:0 Inga chapter	
2012	Grave of the Fireflies	Setsuko	Sentai dub	
2012	Starship Troopers: Invasion	Trig	also motion capture	
2012	Towa no Quon	Kiri	Film series	
2015	Harlock: Space Pirate	Mimay	Nominated – BTVA 2014 Anime Dub Award	
2017	Starship Troopers: Traitor of Mars	Amy Snapp	also motion capture	
2019	Dragon Ball Super: Broly	Gine		
2024	Fist of the North Star Zero: Legend of Kenshiro	Saya		

=== Video games ===
List of voice performances in video games
Year	Title	Role	Notes	Ref(s)
2021	World's End Club	Pielope		
