= Letters from the Fire =

American hard rock band

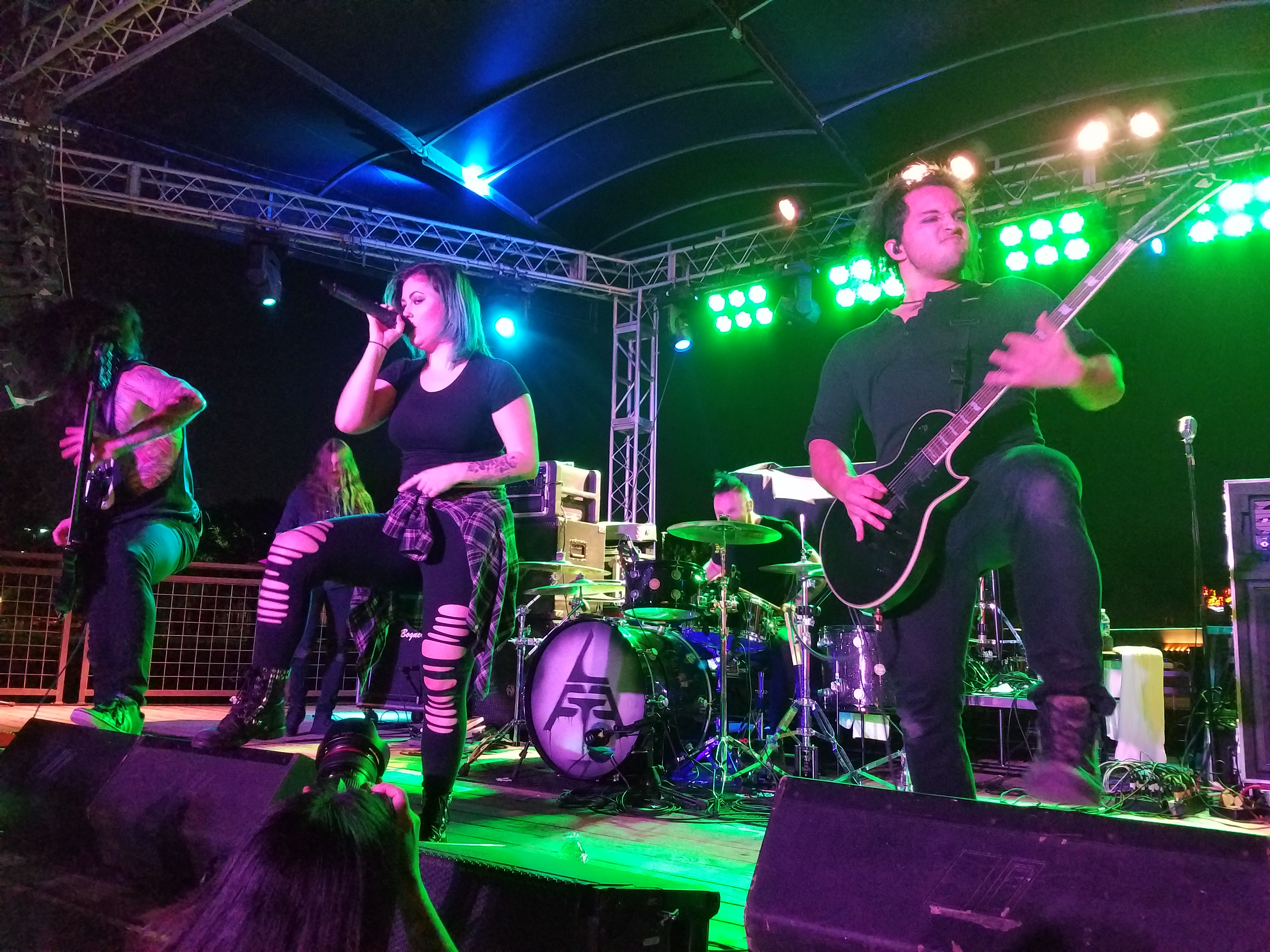
- Letters from the Fire performing in 2016

Background information
- Also known as: LFTF
- Origin: San Francisco, California, U.S.
- Genres: Hard rock
- Years active: 2012–2019
- Labels: Sand Hill Records
- Past members: Mike Keller; Cameron Stucky; Clayton Wages; Nina Bergman; Seth Hostetter; Brian Sumwalt; Alexa Kabazie; Elliot Weber
- Website: lettersfromthefire.net

Letters from the Fire was an American hard rock band from San Francisco, California founded in 2012.

== History ==
=== Beginnings (2012–2016) ===
Carley Coma, of Candiria, released an EP with Letters from the fire. He also toured with them in 2012.

In 2014, Letters from the Fire debut their first commercial EP with a cover of the Beatles' "Eleanor Rigby", which ranked No. 41 on Active Rock Radio as well as a music video for "Zombies in the Sun", which hit No. 31 on the American Mediabase Activerock charts. Following national tours with Pop Evil and Trapt, Letters from the Fire and Elliot Weber (former vocalist) decided to part ways because of artistic differences.

=== Worth the Pain (2016–2017) ===
In May 2016, the band released "Give In to Me", the first single from Worth the Pain, the debut studio album from the group. Produced by Kile Odell, Worth the Pain released worldwide on September 9, 2016. In December 2016, the ensemble released a lyric video for "Control" and a music video for the title track, "Worth the Pain".

The band toured with Lacey Sturm, Palisades, and Stitched Up Heart in February 2017, and performed throughout the United States alongside Adelitas Way in March 2017. In May, July and August 2017, the ensemble plans to travel throughout North America to open for Seether with dates accompanying Black Stone Cherry from late May until the middle of June 2017. On May 31, 2017, the band published a music video for the song "At War".

=== Letters from the Fire and breakup (2017–2019) ===
In late August 2017, Keller announced that the ensemble plans to work on their second studio album. Almost two months later, Kabazie and Sumwalt parted ways with the group, announcing Nina Bergman as the new lead vocalist and Seth Hostetter as their new drummer. Two weeks later, the group announced that they would begin recording in December 2017 with producer Colin Brittain.

On April 1, 2018, Bergman announced that "Comfort You", the first single from Letters from the Fire, their self-titled second studio album, which was released on April 13, 2018. On April 13, 2018, the group announced that the album would be released on June 15, 2018. At that time, the group toured the United States with electronicore band Palisades.

Between late 2018 and late 2019, Letters from the Fire broke up.

== Members ==
=== Former ===
- Mike Keller – rhythm guitar (2012–2019)
- Cameron Stucky – lead guitar (2012–2019)
- Clayton Wages – bass (2012–2019)
- Nina Bergman – vocals (2017–2019)
- Seth Hostetter – drums (2017–2019)
- Carley Coma - vocals (2012)
- Brian Sumwalt – drums (2012–2017)
- Alexa Kabazie – vocals (2015–2017)
- Elliot Weber – vocals (2013–2015)

== Discography ==
=== Studio albums ===
Album details	Peak chart positions	
Album details	US Heat	US Hard Rock
Worth the Pain: Release date: September 9, 2016; Label: Sand Hill Records	18	18
Letters from the Fire: Release date: June 15, 2018; Label: Sand Hill Records	-	-

=== EPs ===
- Rebirth (2012)
- Letters from the Fire (2014)

=== Singles ===
Title	Year	Peak chart positions		Album
Title	Year	US Main. Rock	US Active Rock	Album
"Eleanor Rigby"	2014	-	41	Letters from the Fire (EP)
"Zombies in the Sun"	2014	31	31	Letters from the Fire (EP)
"Give In to Me"	2016	33	31	Worth the Pain
"Worth the Pain"	2016	24	21	Worth the Pain
"Comfort You"	2018	40	—	Letters from the Fire (LP)

=== Music videos ===
- "Zombies in the Sun"
- "Give In to Me"
- "Control"
- "Worth the Pain"
- "At War"
- "Comfort You"
