= Dog & Scissors =

Japanese light novel series

- Cover of the first light novel volume featuring main characters Kirihime Natsuno (left) and Kazuhito Harumi (right)

犬とハサミは使いよう (Inu to Hasami wa Tsukaiyō)
- Genre: Comedy; Mystery
- Light novel
- Written by: Shunsuke Sarai
- Illustrated by: Tetsuhiro Nabeshima
- Published by: Enterbrain
- Imprint: Famitsu Bunko
- Original run: February 28, 2011 – January 30, 2015
- Volumes: 14
- Manga
- Written by: Shunsuke Sarai
- Illustrated by: Kamon Ōniwa
- Published by: Kadokawa Shoten
- Magazine: Shōnen Ace
- Original run: July 2012 – May 2014
- Volumes: 4
- Anime television series
- Directed by: Yukio Takahashi
- Written by: Toshizo Nemoto
- Music by: Akito Matsuda
- Studio: Gonzo
- Licensed by: Crunchyroll (Note: In North America through Crunchyroll, LLC (formerly known as Funimation).); AUS: Madman Entertainment; NA: Sentai Filmworks (expired)
- Original network: AT-X, Tokyo MX, tvk, Sun TV
- English network: US: Anime Network
- Original run: July 1, 2013 – September 16, 2013
- Episodes: 12
- icon

Dog & Scissors (Japanese: 犬とハサミは使いよう, Hepburn: Inu to Hasami wa Tsukaiyō), also known by the abbreviation InuHasa (犬ハサ), is Japanese light novel series written by Shunsuke Sarai and illustrated by Tetsuhiro Nabeshima.

== Plot ==
Dog & Scissors focuses on Kazuhito Harumi, a high school boy who is obsessed with reading light novels. While reading in a cafe one day, he is shot when he attempts to protect a random woman during a robbery. As Kazuhito is determined to read his favorite author's unreleased last work, he gets a second chance and is reincarnated as a long-haired dachshund. The dog is adopted by Kirihime Natsuno, the person he tried to save as well as only one who can understand him in his new form. Kazuhito discovers that she is not only his favorite novelist, but also a sadist who enjoys terrorizing him with scissors.

== Characters ==
Kazuhito Harumi (春海 和人, Harumi Kazuhito)
Voiced by: Takahiro Sakurai (Japanese); Blake Shepard (English)
Kazuhito is a high school bookworm who loves reading, with his favorite author being Shinobu Akiyama. He lived away from his parents and sister so that he could be within walking distance of his favorite bookstore but was killed during a café robbery while protecting another customer. However, due to his regret at being unable to read Akiyama's latest novel and his desire to live, he was resurrected as a dachshund. In this form, he goes by the name "Kuro".
Kirihime Natsuno (夏野 霧姫, Natsuno Kirihime)
Voiced by: Marina Inoue (Japanese); Jessica Calvello (English)
Natsuno is a sadistic scissor-wielding novelist who adopted Kazuhito from a pet store. She is one of the few people who can hear Kazuhito's thoughts. Natsuno writes novels and goes by her pen name, Shinobu Akiyama, whom Kazuhito admires very much. She harbors feelings for Kazuhito and is easily jealous whenever he gets close to another girl. Natsuno is also self-conscious about her small bust and is known to find comical ways to enlarge them which causes anyone who makes some remark about them usually becoming a victim of her anger. She uses durable scissors, known as Hasajiro, which she is owned since childhood. Natsuno is quite proficient with them, making her a tough fighter.
Madoka Harumi (春海 円香, Harumi Madoka)
Voiced by: Kana Asumi (Japanese); Juliet Simmons (English)
Madoka is Kazuhito's little sister who calls him "Kazu-nii". She likes making curry but is a really bad cook, so much so that her food is always censored. Madoka is known to use a high-tech knife that can transform into a dual-bladed chainsaw as well as a cannon. She is obsessed with her brother and would often ask for help with dating other boys to try make him jealous, but to no avail.
Suzuna Hiiragi (柊 鈴菜, Hiiragi Suzuna)
Voiced by: Shizuka Itō (Japanese); Joanne Bonasso (English)
Suzuna is Kirihime's busty editor who works at the company which publishes her works. She is rather unstable, hyper-active, masochistic to the point of wanting to be abused by Kirihime. Suzuna may also be an otaku as she likes acting out and quoting certain anime phrases. She also one of the few people capable of understanding Harumi's thoughts.
Hami Ōsawa (大澤 映見, Ōsawa Hami)
Voiced by: Ai Kakuma (Japanese); Luci Christian (English)
A daughter of a famous author and an extremely apologetic and shy girl, Hami tends to be insecure about herself that she may bother others, to the point she will apologize numerous times and claiming she better dies.
Maxi Akizuki (秋月 マキシ, Akizuki Makishi)
Voiced by: Yū Serizawa (Japanese); Brittney Karbowski (English)
Maxi is a popular young idol who is a famous writer at Natsuno's level. She frequently appears in the series with many servants or bodyguards of hers and is always trying to steal the spotlight. However, Maxi is taken away by her men due to her busy schedule. She dislikes Natsuno and dogs.
Sachi Moribe (森部 佐茅, Moribe Sachi)
Voiced by: Chiwa Saito (Japanese); Carli Mosier (English)
Sachi is a red-haired maid dressed in red who serves Himehagi Momiji with great devotion. She tends to dance and singg alone on a park chants for her mistress and becomes timid towards any witness, to the point she will attack the victim, usually Kazuhito. In combat, Sachi uses a hidden blade within her broom to compete with Natsuno's dog, Hasajiro. Although the two clash with certain recurrence, their battles are almost always interrupted.
Toji Nakahara (中原 冬至, Nakahara Tōji)
Voiced by: Rikiya Koyama (Japanese); John Gremillion (English)
Toji is a rampant criminal and the man responsible for Kazuhito's death. He also becomes an avid reader of Natsuno's book after he began squatting in Kazuhito's apartment and even fights using moves inspired by her characters. Toji is confronted by Natsuno and left hanging from a bridge after a battle. However, even when Natsuno encourages Kazuhito to take revenge, he decides to spare him instead to which he is then promptly arrested.
Momiji Himehagi (姫萩 紅葉, Himehagi Momiji)
Voiced by: Ai Kayano (Japanese); Emily Neves (English)
Kiyoshi Inukai (犬飼 潔, Inukai Kiyoshi)
Voiced by: Wataru Hatano
Sakura Honda (本田 桜, Honda Sakura)
Voiced by: Maaya Uchida (Japanese); Nancy Novotny (English)
Yayoi Honda (本田 弥生, Honda Yayoi)
Voiced by: Hiromi Igarashi (Japanese); Monica Rial (English)
Fumio Honda (本田 文雄, Honda Fumio)
Voiced by: Tōru Ōkawa (Japanese); John Swasey (English)

== Media ==
=== Print ===
Dog & Scissors began as a light novel series written by Shunsuke Sarai, with illustrations by Tetsuhiro Nabeshima. Enterbrain published fourteen volumes from February 28, 2011, to January 30, 2015, under its Famitsu Bunko imprint. Ten comprise the main story, while the other four are short story collections.

A manga adaptation, illustrated by Kamon Ōniwa, was serialized in Kadokawa Shoten's Shōnen Ace between the July 2012 and May 2014 issues. Four tankōbon volumes were released between January 26, 2013, and April 26, 2014. The English version of the manga adaptation is available on BookWalker.

=== Anime ===
A 12-episode anime adaptation directed by Yukio Takahashi and produced by Gonzo it premiered on AT-X and aired between July 1 to September 16, 2013. The series had been acquired for online streaming in North America by Crunchyroll, then owned by the Chernin Group. apart from being licensed in North America by Sentai Filmworks. After Sentai Filmworks lost the rights to the series, it was re-licensed by Funimation, which was renamed itself to Crunchyroll in 2022 after its parent Sony Pictures Television acquired the service that same year. The series uses two pieces of theme music. The opening theme is "Wan Wan Wan Wan N_1!!" (わんわんわんわんN_1!!) by Inu Musume Club consisting of Marina Inoue, Kana Asumi, Shizuka Ito, Ai Kakuma and Yū Serizawa, while the ending theme is "Lemonade Scandal" (レモネイドスキャンダル, Remoneido Sukyandaru) by Yū Serizawa.

==== Episode list ====
No.	Title	Original release date
1	"Every Dog Has His Day"; Transliteration: "Inu mo Arukeba Bō ni Ataru" (Japanese: 犬も歩けば棒に当たる)	July 1, 2013
Kazuhito Harumi is a teenage boy with an obsession of books, particularly the ones written by his favorite author, Shinobu Akiyama. One day, Kazuhito is shot dead in a cafe during a robbery after protecting a customer. Much to his surprise, Kazuhito is later reincarnated as a dachshund dog and was brought to a pet shop. Unable to read a book after one week, Harumi is later adopted by a mysterious girl named Kirihime Natsuno, which Kazuhito later discovers as the customer he protected during the robbery and the real name of Shinobu Akiyama. Under Kirihime's care, Kazuhito came to know of Kirihime's sadistic side and at the same time her positive traits, as well as being a martial artist. After contacting someone asking for Kazuhito's wallet and address, Kirihime, who along with Kazuhito heads to the latter's former apartment.
2	"Strike While the Dog Is Hot"; Transliteration: "Inu wa Atsui Uchi ni Ute" (Japanese: 犬は熱いうちに打て)	July 8, 2013
After being teased of wearing a pet collar and scaring and ignoring passersby respectively, Kirihime and Kazuhito arrive at the latter's former apartment. Kirihime deduced that the man who killed Kazuhito is currently hiding at the latter's own apartment. The latter is proven true and consequently Kirihime and Kazuhito give chase to Kazuhito's killer until they reach a skyway where the killer reveals to have read all of Kirihime's books which lead him to become its fanatic. However, Kazuhito pulls the man down and saves him, stating that he will not kill him since he is also a book lover and if otherwise would result only to tarnishing Kazuhito's way of ever reading again. Moreover, Natsuno is against this as she felt guilty for being the reason of Kazuhito's death. As Kazuhito consoles Kirihime by telling her that he is aware of Kirihime's true self after reading her books, Kirihime breaks into tears. Afterwards, Kirihime began to harbor feelings for Kazuhito.
3	"The Winter Dog Flies into the Fire"; Transliteration: "Tonde Hi ni Iru Fuyu no Inu" (Japanese: 飛んで火に入る冬の犬)	July 15, 2013
Waking up from a nightmare, Kazuhito meets Kirihime's masochistic editor, Suzuna Hiiragi, who tells Kirihime of a slasher currently on the loose. After tormenting Kazuhito for realizing him to be the reason for her writer's block, Kirihime learns more of the slasher incidents from Suzuna and decided to conduct an investigation regarding it, despite her sister's opposition. Amidst their investigation, Kirihime comes face-to-face with rival author and popular idol, Maxi Akizuki. Before the two authors clash, Maxi was dragged by one of her men. Later, as Kazuhito inform that all the slasher victims had bought Kirihemi's books, another incident took place and the duo investigates. As Kirihime chases the presumed slasher, Kazuhito gets caught in a trap. When Kazuhito came, he found himself at his old apartment where he meets his younger sister, Madoka Harumi.
4	"Drowning Men Clutch at Dogs"; Transliteration: "Oboreru Mono wa Inu o mo Tsukamu" (Japanese: 溺れる者は犬をも掴む)	July 22, 2013
As Kirihime loses the supposed slasher during her pursuit, Madoka acts strangely towards Kazuhito, whom he initially believed that she is aware that he is currently a dog but actually is not as shown that she cannot actually understand Kazuhito in his current dog form but nonetheless considered him as her late brother. When Madoka leaves temporarily, Kirihime takes Kazuhito back to her home and interrogates him about his abductee. After being convinced Madoka is really his sister, Kirihime shows Kazuhito an item the supposed slasher dropped during the pursuit - Shinobu Akiyama's book, as Kazuhito deduces that the slasher holds a grudge against its author which Kirihime suspects to be Madoka, much to Kazuhito's disbelief. The next day, the duo continue their investigation and Kirihime gets notified by Suzuna that someone has been shredding her books, which reveals to be Madoka. Back at her home, Kirihime apprises that the cause of Madoka's grievance were her books which the latter thought to be the cause of her late brother's death. After Kirihime agreed in helping Kazuhito in confronting his sister, Madoka breaches into Kirihime's home and gets a hold of Kazuhito.
5	"Nothing Ventured, No Dog Gained"; Transliteration: "Koketsu ni Irazunba Inu o Ezu" (Japanese: 虎穴に入らずんば犬を得ず)	July 29, 2013
Facing the author whom she thought to have caused his brother's death, Kirihime questions Madoka if her recent actions would have made her brother happy knowing that he is one of her readers. Afterwards Madoka jumps off Kirihime's apartment building with Kazuhito in tow. After lamenting on her actions, Madoka and Kirihime have a duel using their respective "weapons", Madoka's multi-purpose electrical knife, Tuna Eater and Kirihime's large pair of shears, Hasajiro. With Kirihime gaining the upper hand, Madoka transforms her knife into a cannon and shoots Kirihime. However Kirihime could deflect the bullet and Madoka realizes her defeat and the two call a truce, becoming friends. Surprisingly, Kirihime and Kazuhito discover that Madoka isn't the rumored slasher. Instead the one behind the incidents was Kirihime's editor, Suzuna, who claim that she did it all for Kirihime's sake so that she can overcome her writer's block. Kirihime then appears, who was already aware of Suzune's plans from the start and states that she had already overcome her slump as shown as she throws multiple written drafts into the air as Suzuna gathers them while sitting. After warning Suzuna of acting "nice" towards her from then onwards; the next day, Kirihime bids Madoka farewell and Suzuna reveals that she had already exterminated the real slasher prior to Kirihime and Kazuhito's investigation, much to the former's frustration.
6	"Rain Settles the Dog"; Transliteration: "Ame-futte Inu Katamaru" (Japanese: 雨降って犬固まる)	August 5, 2013
Kazuhito learns from Yayoi, the younger sister of the cashier of Honda Booksellers, Sakura, that they might be leaving the city. In her apartment, Kazuhito shares to Kirihime the story of his first visit to the said bookstore which eventually ends in Kazuhito being tormented by Kirihime for calling her flat-chested numerous times while she was asleep. Back in the bookstore, Yayoi storms off with Kazuhito where he learns that the book-store is indeed closing. Wanting to save the book-store, Yayoi and Kazuhito publicize the bookstore around the area whilst stumbling on Maxi. Later, while trying to cheer up a weeping Yayoi, Kirihime arrives and after threatening Kazuhito, tells Yayoi to head home which the latter denies, fearing her sister will hate her. Nonetheless, Yayoi returns to the bookstore and apologizes to her sister. Sakura denies the fact that their store is closing as Yayoi misinterpreted it due to seeing her parents fighting frequently. After Sakura reassures Yayoi that they will not get separated, Kazuhito felt grateful for Kirihime for adopting him which is immediately shattered when Kirihime again teases Kazuhito into punishing him.
7	"The Dog Would Not Be Shot but for Its Cries"; Transliteration: "Inu mo Nakazuba Utaremai" (Japanese: 犬も鳴かずば撃たれまい)	August 12, 2013
Kazuhito is told by Kirihime to help look for her lost bra. After Kirihime punishes Kazuhito for trying to get her scent, Suzuna joins the search as Kazuhito ditches to read more books. When he was found out by Kirihime, the two argue and Kazuhito accidentally discovers Kirihime's kit of breast accession, leading him to get punished by Kirihime. As Kirihime and Suzuna continue their search, Kazuhito finds Kirihime's bra under his blanket. Fearing that Kirihime may torture him, Kazuhito plans to dispose Kirihime's bra. Meanwhile Kirihime searches for Kazuhito as she senses someone stalking her. Later on Kazuhito founds a maid performing solely while he was trying to bury Kirihime's bra. Eventually the maid discovers Kazuhito and attempts to kill him. By passing into a busy street, Kazuhito is nearly hit by a truck until Kirihime saves him in the nick of time. Afterwards, Kirihime founds her lost bra on Kazuhito. Seeing a miniature dog design on her bra, Kazuhito deduces that Kirihime love dogs. Acting like a dog, Kazuhito instead got chased by Kirihime as someone continues to stalk the latter.
8	"Dogs in Moderation"; Transliteration: "Yu ni Irite Inu ni Irazare" (Japanese: 湯に入りて犬に入らざれ)	August 19, 2013
Kirihime and Kazuhito arrive in a hot spring inn, as well as Madoka whom Kirihime invited. After settling in, Kirihime felt frustrated as she is constantly hindered by her acquaintances in her advances to Kazuhito as well as the latter's ignorance towards them. As the duo go out, Kirihime went to buy a whetstone and later, took a picture with Kazuhito. Upon returning, Kazuhito notices that the personnel in the inn acting strangely around them. While sharpening her shears in the hot springs, Kazuhito appears and warns Kirihime of a horde of hypnotized helpers wielding blades. Kirihime identifies the horde as the same group who attacked her previously. Afterwards Kazuhito buys Kirihime time to sharpen her shears until Madoka arrives and joins in the fray. With her shears perfectly sharpen, Kirihime and Madoka engage at the horde as Kirihime delivers a fatal blow after seeing her love guide book being stepped and crumpled by the horde. The following day, the inn was closed as Kirihime remarks that she and Kazuhito will return to the inn someday, just the two of them.
9	"There Is No Smoke Without Dog"; Transliteration: "Inu Nai Tokoro ni Kemuri wa Tatazu" (Japanese: 犬無いところに煙は立たず)	August 26, 2013
As Kirihime continues to be bothered by the mobs and her stalker, she and Kazuhito found an extra book in the former's library, a book of an author named Hotaru Fujimaki. After examining the book, Kazuhito notices its resemblance to Kirihime's book. Trying to gain more information, Kirihime summons Suzuna where they learn of the author's account sans its actual name. Kirihime decides to meet the author herself. While passing in an abandoned warehouse, Kirihime and Kazuhito are again faced by the same horde that attacked them in the inn. When Kazuhito came to, he and Kirihime is faced by the latter's stalker and Hotaru Fujimaki's father, Shuzan Ohsawa; the one responsible for sneaking the book into her apartment. By a slip of tongue, the duo realizes that Shuzan isn't the one behind the mob incidents. In an address given to them by Shuzan, Kirihime and Kazuhito enter the latter's high school to meet Hotaru Fujimaki. While Kazuhito is in the library, he meets Hami Osawa.
10	"Time Flies Like a Dog"; Transliteration: "Kōin Inu no Gotoshi" (Japanese: 光陰犬の如し)	September 2, 2013
Prior to the event of his death, Kazuhito once read a manuscript of a timid Hami Ohsawa. With Kazuhito's encouragement, Hami promises to become an author using the manuscript Kazuhito read. Back in the present, Kazuhito realizes that Hami is Hotaru Fujimaki, an anagrammatic pen name derived from Kazuhito's own name. Hami intends to defeat Kirihime to fulfill her promise with Kazuhito. Through the school's PA system, Hami faces Kirihime. By not using violence as a means to settle their challenge, Kirihime and Hami agrees to have a writing contest; the winner is determined to be the one who first finished writing a 100 page manuscript. Much to Hami's surprise, Kirihime was able to withstand all her fallacious techniques and is still ahead in their challenge. However, Hami uses her ultimate technique: Brionac, where the readers do the author's bidding through reading certain keywords in a book. Unfortunately for Hami, Kirihime still could win the challenge after using her mouth to finish writing. After their contest, Kirihime encourages Hami to continue writing using her own strength and in finishing the manuscript Kazuhito read. With this, Hami seems to become Kirihime's pupil in writing as Kirihime uses Brionac against Kazuhito to lunge at her.
11	"A Dog by Chance Is Preordained"; Transliteration: "Inu Furiau mo Tashō no En" (Japanese: 犬振り合うも多生の縁)	September 9, 2013
Madoka will cook curry for Kazuhito much to his fright. However, after sniffing Madoka's cooking, Kazuhito felt at ease for the time being until he found out that Madoka is actually cooking a blue-colored curry and escapes to Honda Booksellers. Kazuhito came to admire Sakura's way of satisfying her customers by supplying them with books of their tastes. Suddenly, Maxi's men appear and purchased all of Momiji Himehagi and Shinobu Akiyama's book from the bookstore. Afterwards Kazuhito is again chased by the singing maid, Moribe Sachi, who also serves Momiji Himehagi. Kirihime then appears to shield Kazuhito and as they prepare to fight, Maxi interferes by challenging Kirihime in the legendary Nine Story Tower Writing Contest. However, much to Kazuhito's dismay, Maxi is again dragged by his men and their contest is cancelled. Later, at the book-store, Hami notifies Sakura that she had made an important decision as an author, as well as Madoka's enrollment to the formers' school and adds that she will continue the legacy of her late brother. Nevertheless, proud of his sister's development, Kazuhito agrees to eat Madoka's curry. In the end, Kazuhito forced himself to eat Madoka's rainbow-colored curry.
12	"Dogs and Scissors Require Good Handling"; Transliteration: "Inu to Hasami wa Tsukaiyō" (Japanese: 犬とハサミは使いよう)	September 16, 2013
After being ignored on her way in, Suzuna suggests if Kirihime will now make her public debut and discuss other future plans. Suzuna also prepares Kirihime's wardrobe for her book signing after her debut. Upon experimenting with some clothes, Madoka and Hami join in the costume play as well. Afterwards, as Suzuna was about to prepare to have Kirihime wear a school swimsuit, Kirihime cuts her off instead, much to her excitement. Eventually, Suzuna coerces her way to booze Kirihime with alcohol in hopes to improve her image—or rather, to have her punish her more. Consequently, Kirihime's personality alters to a kinder and warmer one, much to the horror of both Kazuhito and Suzuna. Later, as Kirihime intends to sleep together with Kazuhito, Kirihime vomits unto Kazuhito. The following day, Kirihime returns to normal as she offers to bathe Kazuhito off, adding that she always act kind to him. In the epilogue, while asking for his thoughts on her book, Kazuhito instead reprimands Kirihime for not writing the final volume of his favorite series which lead Kirihime to chase Kazuhito once more.

== See also ==
- From Old Country Bumpkin to Master Swordsman, another light novel series with the same illustrator
- Magudala de Nemure, another light novel series with the same illustrator
- Reborn as a Space Mercenary, another light novel series with the same illustrator
