= Magudala de Nemure =

Japanese light novel series

- Magdala de Nemure light novel volume 1

マグダラで眠れ
- Genre: Adventure, Drama, Fantasy
- Light novel
- Written by: Isuna Hasekura
- Illustrated by: Tetsuhiro Nabeshima
- Published by: ASCII Media Works
- Imprint: Dengeki Bunko
- Original run: July 10, 2012 – February 10, 2016
- Volumes: 8
- Manga
- Written by: Isuna Hasekura
- Illustrated by: Arisaka Ako
- Published by: Kadokawa Shoten
- Magazine: Young Ace
- Original run: June 2013 – May 2015
- Volumes: 4

Magdala de Nemure (マグダラで眠れ; "May Your Soul Rest in Magdala") is a Japanese light novel series written by Isuna Hasekura, with illustrations by Tetsuhiro Nabeshima. A manga adaptation illustrated by Arisaka Ako was serialized from the June 2013 issue to the May 2015 issue of Kadokawa Shoten's Young Ace.

== Plot ==
It is a world where order is maintained by three factions, the Church which bears the greatest authority, the Order of Clausius possessing influence on par with the Church, immense assets and military might, and lastly the Guild of Commerce, an association of merchants and artisans alike.

The alchemist Kusler who was captured and imprisoned because he committed the offense of trying to burn a saint's bones, sold his skills and talents to the Order of Clausius. Together with an old friend, Weland, they were then dispatched towards the town of Grubetti which was close to the front lines.

And then at a workshop in Grubetti which boasted advanced equipment due to being near the front lines, Kusler met the nun Fenesis who had introduced herself as a Monitor.

== Characters ==
=== Main characters ===
Kusler (クースラ, Kūsura)
An alchemist who is sent to Grubetti after committing the crime of burning a saint's bones. He quickly grows interested in Fenesis and develops a crush on her. His name means "interest".
Ul Fenesis (ウル・フェネシス, Uru Feneshisu)
A nun who is a member of a tribe of human-animal-hybrids. Since her people are often victims of racist attacks, she keeps this part of her identity secret and hides her cat ears.
Weland (ウェランド, Uerando)
A colleague of Kusler who tried to murder him multiple times before the series started. Is said to be a ladies man who often got into trouble for his behaviour and he even touched Fenesis' breasts against her will to prove she's still almost a child.
Iriene Brunner (イリーネ・ブルナー, Irīne burunā)

== Manga ==
A manga adaptation illustrated by Arisaka Ako was serialized from the June 2013 issue to the May 2015 issue of Kadokawa Shoten's Young Ace. The first volume was released on August 31, 2013.

The manga also received a German translation which was published by Panini Manga and renamed to Magdala de Nemure. The first volume was released in August 2014 and the last one in April 2016.

The French translation was released by Ototo Manga.

== See also ==
- Dog & Scissors, another light novel series with the same illustrator
- From Old Country Bumpkin to Master Swordsman, another light novel series with the same illustrator
- Reborn as a Space Mercenary, another light novel series with the same illustrator
