= Welcome to Japan, Ms. Elf! =

Japanese light novel series and its adaptations

- Cover for the first Japanese volume of Welcome to Japan, Ms. Elf!, featuring Marie (left) and Kazuhiro Kitase (right)

日本へようこそエルフさん。 (Nihon e Yōkoso Erufu-san)
- Genre: Cooking; Reverse isekai; Romantic comedy; Slice of life
- Novel series
- Written by: Makishima Suzuki
- Published by: Shōsetsuka ni Narō
- Original run: February 22, 2017 – present
- Light novel
- Written by: Makishima Suzuki
- Illustrated by: Yappen
- Published by: Hobby Japan
- English publisher: NA: J-Novel Club
- Imprint: HJ Novels
- Original run: August 25, 2018 – present
- Volumes: 11
- Manga
- Written by: Makishima Suzuki
- Illustrated by: Shimo Aono
- Published by: Hobby Japan
- English publisher: NA: J-Novel Club
- Imprint: HJ Comics
- Magazine: Comic Fire
- Original run: December 24, 2018 – present
- Volumes: 11
- Anime television series
- Directed by: Tōru Kitahata
- Written by: Aya Yoshinaga
- Music by: Kanako Hara
- Studio: Zero-G
- Licensed by: Crunchyroll; SEA: Tropics Entertainment
- Original network: MBS, TBS, CBC, BS11, AT-X
- Original run: January 10, 2025 – March 28, 2025
- Episodes: 12
- icon

Welcome to Japan, Ms. Elf! (Japanese: 日本へようこそエルフさん。, Hepburn: Nihon e Yōkoso Erufu-san) is a Japanese light novel series written by Makishima Suzuki and illustrated by Yappen. It began serialization online in 2017 on the user-generated novel publishing website Shōsetsuka ni Narō. It was acquired by Hobby Japan, who published the first light novel volume in August 2018 under their HJ Novels imprint. Eleven volumes have been released as of January 2025. A manga adaptation with art by Shimo Aono has been serialized online via Hobby Japan's Comic Fire website since December 2018. Both the light novel and manga have been licensed in North America by J-Novel Club. An anime television series adaptation produced by Zero-G aired from January to March 2025.

== Plot ==
Ever since Kazuhiro Kitase was a child, whenever he slept, he would dream of a fantasy world. One day, he explores the fantasy world with his elf friend, Marie, but they get killed by a dragon. They abruptly wake up in his home in Japan and they eventually work out that whenever he falls asleep or dies in the fantasy world, he and anyone he is touching are sent back to Japan, then they can return to the fantasy world by falling asleep. They regularly go back and forth, with him helping Marie adjust to life in modern Japan and then going on quests in the fantasy world and eventually bringing others back to Japan.

== Characters ==
Kazuhiro Kitase (北瀬一廣, Kitase Kazuhiro)/Kazuhiho (カズヒホ)
Voiced by: Yūsuke Kobayashi
A 25-year-old Japanese salaryman who since his childhood habitually shifts into a fantasy world when falling asleep on Earth. In the other world, where he calls himself Kazuhiho (due to a childhood spelling mistake) and ages much slower, he is still 15 years old and an Illusory Swordsman who is traveling with Marie. It is only after he and Marie are fire-blasted by a dragon and Marie unexpectedly appears by his side in Japan that he realizes that the other world is real and his shifting ability can be extended to others. Among his special skills in the other world are the ability to create illusions, to travel through another dimension to cover distances with speed, and a plethora of languages he picked up. However, except for food, he is not able to take any items to either world during his shifts. He falls in love with Marie as the story progresses.
Marie (マリー, Marī)/Mariabelle (マリアーベル, Mariāberu)
Voiced by: Kaede Hondo
A 102-year-old Elven Spirit Sorceress—a mage skilled in both arcane and spirit magic—and a longtime adventuring companion of Kazuhiro after she had killed him on their first meeting. While they intrude on a dragon's lair to have a look at its eggs, they are discovered and blasted with dragon fire. When Kazuhiro hugs her in an attempt to shield her, he inadvertently takes her back to Earth, where she becomes enamored with most of the novelties found in its culture, particularly the food. In time, she also falls in love with Kazuhiro. A running gag throughout the series involves Marie playfully commenting on Kazuhiro's sleepy looking face, much to his chagrin.
Wridra (ウリドラ, Uridora)
Voiced by: Yumi Uchiyama
An ancient female Arkdragon who can adopt a near-human form by transplanting her consciousness into a body regurgitated from her draconic self. When Kazuhiro and Marie intruded on her lair to take a look at her eggs, she took offense and killed them both, which resulted in Marie getting displaced to Earth along with Kazuhiro for the first time. After the two return, they manage to pacify Wridra with an offering of Japanese food and malt beer; and after taking a fancy on these delicacies, Wridra initially pays them with her own scales and blood (which are extremely powerful and rare magic components) and later decides to visit Earth as well.
Mewi (ミュイ, Myui)
Voiced by: Rico Sasaki
A young cat beastman and a member of the Neko Tribe who was living with his grandfather in hiding ever since their tribe was decimated by a monster, which was looking for magic stones the beastpeople had mined and which it was guarding, and subsequent human persecution. Captured by some bandits, who also killed his grandfather, he is forced to use his grandfather's magic stone to summon monsters for waylaying travelers until he is freed by Kazuhiro and Marie.
Sven (スヴェン, Suven)
Voiced by: Showtaro Morikubo
A sociopathic mage with the power of prophecy. Also known as the Twin Blade Magic Swordsman. While renowned for his prowess, he is also infamous for his unstable personality. When Kazuhiro and Marie discover a new, unexplored labyrinth, he becomes consumed by jealousy and puts all his efforts into a string of attempts to thwart them.
Kaoruko Ichijo (一条 薫子, Ichijō Kaoruko)
Voiced by: Sayuri Yahagi
A young librarian and acquaintance of Kazuhiro who lives in the same apartment complex, and takes an immediate liking to Marie.
Toru Ichijo (一条 徹, Ichijō Tōru)
Voiced by: Kenji Hamada
Kaoruko's husband.

== Media ==
=== Light novels ===
Written by Makishima Suzuki, Welcome to Japan, Ms. Elf began serialization as a web novel on the user-generated novel publishing website Shōsetsuka ni Narō on February 22, 2017. It was later acquired by Hobby Japan who released it under their HJ Novels light novel imprint with illustrations by Yappen in August 2018. Eleven volumes (including six volumes published digital-only) have been published as of August 2025. The light novel is licensed in North America by J-Novel Club.

No.	Original release date	Original ISBN	English release date	English ISBN
1	August 25, 2018	978-4-7986-1735-0	February 23, 2019	978-1-7183-3600-1
2	December 22, 2018	978-4-7986-1843-2	July 9, 2019	978-1-7183-3602-5
3	May 24, 2019	978-4-7986-1912-5	February 23, 2020	978-1-7183-3604-9
4	September 21, 2019	978-4-7986-2001-5	June 21, 2020	978-1-7183-3606-3
5	February 22, 2020	978-4-7986-2107-4	December 27, 2020	978-1-7183-3608-7
6	July 22, 2020 (ebook)	—	May 17, 2021	978-1-7183-3610-0
7	July 19, 2021 (ebook)	—	December 21, 2021	978-1-7183-3612-4
8	October 19, 2022 (ebook)	—	June 20, 2023	978-1-7183-3614-8
9	October 19, 2023 (ebook)	—	August 9, 2024	978-1-7183-3616-2
10	January 18, 2025 (ebook)	—	July 11, 2025	978-1-7183-3618-6
11	August 19, 2025 (ebook)	—	–	—

=== Manga ===
A manga adaptation illustrated by Shimo Aono began serialization on Hobby Japan's Comic Fire manga website on December 24, 2018. As of December 2025, twelve volumes have been released. The manga is also licensed by J-Novel Club.

No.	Original release date	Original ISBN	English release date	English ISBN
1	May 27, 2019	978-4-7986-1935-4	June 22, 2021	978-1-7183-0510-6
2	March 27, 2020	978-4-7986-2155-5	July 27, 2021	978-1-7183-0511-3
3	August 27, 2020	978-4-7986-2251-4	November 3, 2021	978-1-7183-0513-7
4	March 1, 2021	978-4-7986-2431-0	December 29, 2021	978-1-7183-0512-0
5	September 1, 2021	978-4-7986-2585-0	April 26, 2022	978-1-7183-0514-4
6	March 1, 2022	978-4-7986-2652-9	September 27, 2022	978-17183-0515-1
7	September 29, 2022	978-4-7986-2884-4	March 8, 2023	978-1-7183-0516-8
8	May 1, 2023	978-4-7986-3071-7	January 3, 2024	978-1-7183-0517-5
9	December 28, 2023	978-4-7986-3332-9	December 25, 2024	978-1-7183-0518-2
10	August 1, 2024	978-4-7986-3562-0	April 9, 2025	978-1-7183-0519-9
11	March 1, 2025	978-4-7986-3775-4	December 17, 2025	978-1-7183-0548-9
12	December 27, 2025	978-4-7986-3915-4	September 9, 2026	—

=== Anime ===
An anime adaptation was announced on December 28, 2023. It was later confirmed to be a television series produced by Zero-G and directed by Tōru Kitahata, with Aya Yoshinaga writing and overseeing series scripts, and Madoka Hirayama designing the characters and serving as chief animation director, and Kanako Hara composing the music. The series aired from January 10 to March 28, 2025, on the Animeism programming block on MBS, TBS, and CBC. (Note: MBS and TBS listed the series premiere on January 10, 2025, at 25:53, which is effectively January 11 at 1:53 a.m. JST, though AT-X has the earliest release on January 10.) The opening theme song is "Palette Days", performed by Rico Sasaki, while the ending theme song is "Yummy Yummy", performed by Nijisanji VTubers Kaede Higuchi and Kanae. Crunchyroll streams the series. Tropics Entertainment licensed the series in Southeast Asia for streaming on the Tropics Anime Asia YouTube channel.

==== Episodes ====
No.	Title	Directed by (Note: Production staff information is taken from the ending credits of each episode.)	Written by	Storyboard by	Original release date
1	"Good Morning, Ms. Elf."; Transliteration: "Ohayō, Erufu-san." (Japanese: おはよう、エルフさん。)	Tōru Kitahata	Aya Yoshinaga	Tōru Kitahata	January 10, 2025
Kazuhiro Kitase does his office job, then returns to his apartment and sleeps. Whenever he sleeps, he goes to a fantasy world and is only able to bring food with him. He meets his elf friend Mariabelle (Marie) and explores a dungeon with her. Using his ability to speak all languages, he befriends a lizard man who warns that a dragon is nesting nearby. He recklessly goes to see the eggs, but the dragon awakens and blasts them with fire, with him futilely shielding Marie. They wake up back in his apartment, but Marie is completely naked. When she calms down, she is fascinated by the modern world. After he gets her some clothes, he explains that he always wakes up here whenever he sleeps or dies in the other world, and suspects he brought Marie because they were touching. He takes her to a restaurant, using a hat to hide her elf ears, and learns she cannot speak or read Japanese, so only he can communicate with her. She absolutely loves the rich food, then he takes her to view the cherry blossoms. As she enjoys the beautiful spectacle, he officially welcomes her to Japan.
2	"Have a Katsu-don, Ms. Elf."; Transliteration: "Katsu-don desu yo, Erufu-san." (Japanese: カツ丼ですよ、エルフさん。)	Masaki Utsunomiya	Aya Yoshinaga	Toshihiko Masuda	January 17, 2025
Marie speculates that her world could one day become as great as the modern world. Seeing this as his chance to grow closer to Marie, Kazuhiro promises to take care of her if she cannot return home. They return to his apartment and he has to teach her how the bathtub works. He explains that until he brought Marie, he was only able to transport food and drink, and she speculates that some entity is responsible for his going back and forth. Realizing that when he sleeps he will wake up back in the dragon's nest, they make a plan and then sleep while touching. They both wake up in the dragon's nest, but he apologizes for the intrusion and offers a gift of food and beer. The dragon accepts and goes to sleep after regurgitating a humanoid avatar to interact with them and sample the food and beer. Impressed, she pays them with a shed scale and some of her crystalized blood, both of which are extremely valuable. Kazuhiro and Marie leave and head towards town, deciding to keep the items secret to prevent greedy people from attacking the dragon. Kazuhiro worries he'll have to bid Marie farewell once they reach town and he wakes up, but Marie suggests that she can sleep wherever with him so she can go back to Japan, much to his joy.
3	"Lost Magic Stones"; Transliteration: "Ushinawa reta Maseki" (Japanese: 失われた魔石)	Minema Mori	Aya Yoshinaga	Akira Nishimori	January 24, 2025
Marie starts learning Japanese by watching television. They eat and Kazuhiro learns she cannot handle alcohol. When they returned to Earth, Marie woke up in her pajamas and Kazuhiro confirmed that their bodies and equipment disappear in the other world while they are on Earth. They go to sleep to return to the other world and decide to go to a pyramid in the desert to look for rare magic stones. He uses an ability to open an interdimensional tunnel to reduce the travel time to 20 minutes. Meanwhile, a catboy is in chains and being abused by his bandit captors. Kazuhiro and Marie find an oasis in the broken pyramid. They are attacked by monsters called kuppas and slay them. The bandits spot them and the leader uses X-Ray vision to see the dragon scale and blood in their bag, so they order the catboy to help them. The catboy summons a sea serpent that kills them, making them wake up back in Kazuhiro's apartment. They decide to make a plan to defeat the bandits, but first, they want to have fun and tour the city.
4	"Good Night, Ms. Elf."; Transliteration: "Oyasumi Nasai, Erufu-san." (Japanese: おやすみなさい、エルフさん。)	JOL-chan	Aya Yoshinaga	Ryūichi Akehi	January 31, 2025
Marie cannot detect any spirits in the city, then briefly plays with a stray cat. They visit the library to check out a picture book to help Marie learn Japanese. Kazuhiro learns the librarian is his neighbor Kaoruko Ichijo, and he acts as an interpreter to introduce her to Marie. Back in the apartment, they watch a DVD of an old fashioned cartoon. Later, there is a mild earthquake that makes Marie panic and run out of the bath without dressing, embarrassing her. After they eat, he plans to use his dimensional shortcut to escape the sea serpent if needed, but they realize the catboy is a slave and they should rescue him. He reads the picture book to lull her to sleep. As he sleeps, he thinks he never appreciated Japan before, but he enjoys sharing it with her. They wake up back in the oasis alone and after forming an official party so that they can communicate over long distances, decide to go after the bandits.
5	"Illusory Swordsman"; Transliteration: "Mugen Kenshi" (Japanese: 夢幻剣士)	Ryōichi Kuraya	Aya Yoshinaga	Akira Nishimori	February 7, 2025
The catboy, Mewi, remembers his grandfather giving him a magic stone. Kazuhiro and Marie split up, with Marie turning invisible and summoning fire lizards to take on the sea serpent and Kazuhiro finding Mewi. Mewi explains he and his grandfather were among the last of their kind until the bandits killed his grandfather and enslaved him. The bandits attack, but Kazuhiro breaks Mewi's chains and escapes with him. The bandit leader can see Marie despite her invisibility and sends two men after her. Kazuhiro intercepts, but the leader blasts them with a fireball he barely dodges, killing his own men. Mewi is recaptured, but Kazuhiro saves him again. The sea serpent turns on the bandits and buries them in sand. Mewi apologizes for summoning it so many times and gives it the magic stone. The sea serpent eats it and burrows in the sand, revealing an underground labyrinth. Kazuhiro and Marie report the incident to some knights who cordon the area off and promise to catch the bandits. Kazuhiro asks the knights to take care of Mewi and is excited to explore the labyrinth.
6	"It's French Cuisine, Ms. Elf."; Transliteration: "Furenchi desu yo, Erufu-san." (Japanese: フレンチですよ、エルフさん。)	Hisaya Takabayashi	Aya Yoshinaga	Ryūichi Akehi	February 14, 2025
Marie is not high-ranked enough to explore the labyrinth and Kazuhiro refuses to go without her. The dragon spies on them through her crystalized blood, then her eggs start to hatch. Back in Japan, Kazuhiro goes to work while Marie says the guild will allow her if they prove their competence. Marie cleans the apartment, cooks chicken with the oven, and watches anime. Kazuhiro believes they may need a third teammate to tank attacks. Kaoruko invites him and Marie to hang out with her and her husband Toru. They meet and go to a French restaurant, and Marie's Japanese has improved enough to greet them. After eating, Toru offers to pay for a future trip to a hot spring and Kazuhiro accepts. Upon learning Marie likes anime, Kaoruko invites her to her home to watch anime together while Kazuhiro is at work. Despite his misgivings, he agrees. As they go home, he decides not to explore the labyrinth and thanks her for helping him socialize.
7	"Shining Magic Stone"; Transliteration: "Kagayaku Maseki" (Japanese: 輝く魔石)	Ryōichi Kuraya	Aya Yoshinaga	Toshihiko Masuda	February 21, 2025
The expedition to explore the labyrinth assembles. Despite Kazuhiro's reluctance to socialize, Marie makes him talk to the old sorcerer Aja, who is able to tell Kazuhiro is not from their world and he is living with Marie. After going clothes shopping, they meet the expedition leader Hakam who is raising Mewi, though he needs Kazuhiro to translate since Mewi doesn't speak the common tongue. They notice the dragon scale and blood stopped glowing and fear something happened to her. At the guild, Sven volunteers to explore the labyrinth but Marie's teacher Ludry wants her to do it, making Sven jealous. Kazuhiro and Marie visit the dragon who is raising her babies. When they forgot to bring food, the dragon throws a tantrum, ranting that raising her babies is hard and she hasn't had a break. Kazuhiro impulsively invites her humanoid avatar to Earth for their hot spring trip and she agrees. After a few days, Kazuhiro and Marie go to meet the dragon to take her to Earth, but Sven spies on them.
8	"Welcome to Japan, Ms. Arkdragon."; Transliteration: "Nihon e Yōkoso, Madō-ryū-san." (Japanese: 日本へようこそ、魔導竜さん。)	Tōru Kitahata	Aya Yoshinaga	Akira Nishimori	February 28, 2025
Sven and his young assistant follow Kazuhiro and Marie while invisible. Sven uses clairvoyance to see the dragon, shocking him, before he and his assistant are attacked by guardian statues and forced to escape. Kazuhiro, Marie, and the dragon all fall asleep and wake up on Earth, but the dragon's humanoid avatar is completely naked. Though she does not care, the former two freak out and try to give her clothes that are too small for her until she magically converts her horn and tail into proper clothes. She reveals she can speak the elvish language. While driving to the hot springs, the dragon introduces herself as Wridra and is fascinated by the modern world. Wridra then uses her magic to make Marie's ears look normal so she doesn't have to conceal them. As the girls enjoy the women's side hot springs and sauna, Wridra admits she used her scale and blood to spy on them and is disappointed that they have not been intimate yet. Marie fears Kazuhiro doesn't see her as a woman, so Wridra tells her to just kiss him anywhere and see his reaction. Marie later kisses him on the forehead and is pleased by his reaction. After eating, Wridra bathes again while Marie sleeps. Kazuhiro cannot stop thinking about the kiss.
9	"Oracle and Honest"; Transliteration: "Tenkei to Guchoku" (Japanese: 天啓と愚直)	Tōru Kitahata	Aya Yoshinaga	Toshihiko Masuda	March 7, 2025
While driving home, Wridra is irritated that Kazuhiro and Marie's relationship is developing so slowly and demands to explore the labyrinth with them. Back in the other world, Sven confronts them and demands to know where they went. Ranting that he will kill them, then explore the labyrinth and get its treasures, he has his assistant teleport Marie and Wridra elsewhere, but Wridra conjures a sword and passes it to Kazuhiro before she goes. The guild watches the fight on a magical viewing window. The assistant attacks Marie and Wridra with the ghosts of wyverns, but Wridra takes control of them and summons her true form to scare the child into submission. Kazuhiro takes a lot of damage and is knocked into a river, but the others return and scold him for doing so poorly, so he rallies and knocks Sven out. Sven and his assistant are arrested and the guildmaster, who knows Wridra, gives the party permission to explore the labyrinth. They return to Mewi and Wridra gives him some crystalized dragon blood to process. Mewi turns it into a magic staff that Wridra gives to Marie.
10	"A Fun Ancient Labyrinth"; Transliteration: "Tanoshii Kodai Meikyū" (Japanese: 楽しい古代迷宮)	Hisaya Takabayashi	Aya Yoshinaga	Ryūichi Akehi	March 14, 2025
The party finds a market set up around the labyrinth entrance. Two merchants disrespect them and refuse service, but a warrior named Zera forces them to serve them as the ones who discovered the labyrinth. Zera's captain Doula, whom he is in love with but she has constantly refused him, gifts them special tea leaves. In a tent, Kazuhiro and Marie return to Japan, but Wridra declines and keeps watch. The two go shopping and he lets her try ice cream for the first time. Marie cooks curry and Kazuhiro briefly returns to the other world to invite Wridra to try it. After eating, Wridra is fascinated by a video of a train and wants to ride one. The other two have a planned ride, but not enough tickets to let Wridra join them, depressing her. Back in the other world, they meet Hakam and Aja, who gift them a communication device with a holographic map of the labyrinth made by advance scouts. After Hakam says it is tradition to name the team after a Precious Stone, Kazuhiro names them Team Amethyst. In the labyrinth, they find a mural depicting a legend about the Age of Demons. After a while, they are irritated that the earlier teams wiped out the monsters. Wridra is still upset about not getting to ride the train, so she says she will spar with Kazuhiro and attacks him with her sword, scaring him out of his mind.
11	"Two People and One Furry Friend, Strolling Through Aomori"; Transliteration: "Burari Aomori, Futa-ri to I-ppiki." (Japanese: ぶらり青森、二人と一匹。)	Daiji Iwanaga	Aya Yoshinaga	Daiji Iwanaga	March 21, 2025
Wridra summons a cat familiar for Kazuhiro and Marie to take on the train ride since she can see and hear through it. They take a train to his grandfather's house; his grandmother had passed away. Marie is fascinated by the countryside as his grandfather receives them and takes a liking to Marie and the cat. She tries to find spirits, but only finds a rat. They eat and his grandfather gifts Marie a hand-stitched purse. The two go for a walk and she summons spirits from her world to light their path. She then becomes upset when she realizes she had been calling him "Kazuhiho" all this time and did not know his real name was "Kazuhiro" until his grandfather called him that. After they bathe, they go to sleep. His grandfather checks on them and sees them disappearing to the other world. He is not surprised and merely bids them farewell for now, indicating he was aware of Kazuhiro's secret.
12	"It's a Blizzard of Cherry Blossom Petals, Ms. Elf."; Transliteration: "Sakura Fubuki desu yo, Erufu-san." (Japanese: 桜吹雪ですよ、エルフさん。)	Tōru Kitahata	Aya Yoshinaga	Tōru Kitahata	March 28, 2025
Kazuhiro and Marie wake up in the other world and are greeted by Wridra. When he idly mentions there is a hot spring near his grandfather's home, the other two attack him to work up a sweat, to his chagrin since he wanted to relax. Kazuhiro, Marie, and the cat wake up on Earth and go to the hot spring, but his grandfather reminds them animals are not allowed and grabs the cat. It breaks free and follows them; the owner fortunately likes cats and lets her in. Afterwards, the grandfather loans them his truck so they can tour the town. The cherry blossoms are falling, then Kazuhiro teaches them the concept of taking photos. In a museum, Marie and the cat are fascinated by the weapons and contemplate duplicating the guns in the other world, but he forbids it. When caught in a cherry blossom storm, Kazuhiro and Marie kiss, then awkwardly confess it was their first. The grandfather shows Marie his photo album, then confides that ever since Kazuhiro's parents abandoned him, he stopped smiling and socializing, then thanks her for making him smile again. A spirit mischievously makes Marie's ears look elf-like again, but he reveals he already knew their secret and they let Kazuhiro know. They return to Kazuhiro's apartment and are eager for new food and new adventures.

== Reception ==
Demelza from Anime UK News felt the manga gave a unique twist on common tropes, while also praising the characters. Christopher Farris from Anime News Network praised the characters and artwork, while also feeling the story was largely uneventful and had untapped potential.

== See also ==
- I'm in Love with the Villainess, a light novel series whose manga adaptation has the same illustrator
- Survival in Another World with My Mistress!, another light novel series with the same illustrator
