= Chief of Station (film) =

2024 film by Jesse V. Johnson

- Theatrical release poster
- Directed by: Jesse V. Johnson
- Written by: George Mahaffey
- Produced by: Jonathan Halperyn; Daniel Kresmery; Simon Williams; Matthew Shreder; Steve Lee Jones
- Starring: Aaron Eckhart; Olga Kurylenko; Alex Pettyfer; Daniel Bernhardt; Chris Petrovski; Nick Moran; Kris Johnson; James Faulkner
- Cinematography: Jonathan Hall
- Edited by: Matthew Lorentz; Richard Blackburn
- Music by: Sean Murray
- Production companies: Concourse Media; Bee Holder; Mirror Productions; Hero Squared; Ashland Hill Media Finance
- Distributed by: Vertical
- Release date: May 3, 2024
- Running time: 98 minutes
- Country: United States
- Language: English

Chief of Station is a 2024 American action thriller film written by George Mahaffey, directed by Jesse V. Johnson and starring Aaron Eckhart, Olga Kurylenko, Alex Pettyfer, Daniel Bernhardt, Chris Petrovski, Nick Moran, Kris Johnson, and James Faulkner. It was released on May 3, 2024.

== Plot ==
Ben Malloy is CIA Chief of Station in Eastern Europe, and finds himself with his wife Farrah in Budapest. On their wedding anniversary, the café where they met is bombed and she dies. After learning that the death of his wife was not an accident, Ben, back in Washington, decides to go back to Budapest to gather new evidence. He stops there after having learned that his son, Nick, a recently graduated IT engineer has met a girl and lives in Croatia; they have planned to meet in Paris.

In Budapest, Ben challenges Evgeny, a FSB officer, who tells him that Farrah was a supervisor of foreign agents and hid things from him. When he is about to reveal what, Evgeny is shot by Kharon, a Chechen assassin, and a group of men. Branca, Ben's ex-partner in Hungary, saves Ben and takes him on a river boat. In Croatia, Branca had Nick kidnapped by CIA agents. Ben discovers Branca has betrayed him; Branca tortures Ben to discover what Farrah has given him before her death. A former Russian agent of Farrah, Krystyna, saves him and they escape. They go to Farrah's cache and discover on her laptop she had intel on Branca and CIA Deputy Director Williams having accepted bribes. Ben offers to exchange Farrah's laptop in exchange for Nick's release.

Finally, they meet in Hungary, where they save Nick and Krystyna goes her separate way. Nick kills Kharon after a car chase, before capturing Branca and exposing Deputy Director Williams at a meeting where he is taken in to custody by Evgeny, who survived the earlier shooting, with Interpol agents. Ben gets to meet Nick and his new girlfriend.

== Cast ==
- Aaron Eckhart as Ben Malloy
- Olga Kurylenko as Krystyna Kowerski
- Alex Pettyfer as John Branca
- Chris Petrovski as Nick
- Laëtitia Eïdo as Farrah
- Nick Moran as Evgeny, FSB
- Daniel Bernhardt as Kharon
- Nina Bergman as Hitchens
- James Faulkner as Deputy Director Williams
- Kris Johnson as Ted Waltz
- Isobel Wood as Veronique

== Production ==
In August 2022, it was announced that Kurylenko and Alec Baldwin were cast in the film. In September 2022, it was announced that Pettyfer and Petrovski were cast in the film. In October 2022, it was announced that Eckhart replaced Baldwin due to schedule conflicts.

The film was shot on location in Budapest. In February 2023, it was announced that filming was completed.

== Release ==
In January 2024, Vertical acquired U.S. distribution rights to the film, releasing it on May 3, 2024.

== Reception ==
The film received very mixed reviews. Jeffrey M. Anderson of Common Sense Media awarded the film two stars out of five.

The Guardian wrote, "In the absence of any feel for intrigue, not least the potential intricacies of a husband-and-wife spook team, Johnson shuffles a deck of espionage-film cliches largely at random – including frequent appearances for the card in which someone points out that, in this world, can you really know anyone? Chief of Station aspires to 21st-century new world order relevancy, with an amoral Russia challenging the west. But instead of the John le Carré scalpel, we get overworked cobblers like: “There’s a reason why the clandestine world is described as a wilderness of mirrors.” Alex Pettyfer, as the new CIA station chief John Branca, has all the acting presence and immediacy of a man reading his WhatsApp messages at the same time (or maybe it was a better script)."

However GeekVibesNation found that "Chief of Station is unlikely to reinvent the wheel regarding espionage thrillers. Still, Eckhart’s action and, at times, stoic performance are enough to make this film passable and frankly enjoyable." and Screen Rant wrote, "Eckhart's latest is Chief of Station, where his ex-CIA agent chases down the people responsible for his wife's death. The Jesse V. Johnson-directed action film co-stars Olga Kurylenko and Alex Pettyfer and is a slower burn in terms of setpieces compared to The Bricklayer. Even so, Eckhart's Chief of Station is an enjoyable slice of action cinema, with the actor doing all the fistfights, gun battles and car chases required of the genre".
