= Reborn as a Space Mercenary =

Japanese light novel series

- Reborn as a Space Mercenary: I Woke Up Piloting the Strongest Starship!
- First light novel volume cover, featuring (from left to right) Mimi, Hiro, and Elma

目覚めたら最強装備と宇宙船持ちだったので、一戸建て目指して傭兵として自由に生きたい (Mezametara Saikyō Sōbi to Uchūsen Mochi Datta no de, Ikkodate Mezashite Yōhei Toshite Jiyū ni Ikitai)
- Genre: Isekai; Science fiction; Harem
- Novel series
- Written by: Ryūto
- Published by: Shōsetsuka ni Narō
- Original run: February 4, 2019 – present
- Light novel
- Written by: Ryūto
- Illustrated by: Tetsuhiro Nabeshima
- Published by: Fujimi Shobo
- English publisher: NA: Seven Seas Entertainment
- Imprint: Kadokawa Books
- Original run: July 10, 2019 – present
- Volumes: 18
- Manga
- Written by: Ryūto
- Illustrated by: Shinichi Matsui
- Published by: Media Factory
- English publisher: NA: Seven Seas Entertainment
- Imprint: MF Comics
- Magazine: ComicWalker (Note: ComicWalker changed its name to KadoComi (カドコミ) in December 2023.)
- Original run: November 24, 2019 – present
- Volumes: 12
- Anime television series
- Directed by: Norihiko Nagahama
- Written by: Takamitsu Kōno
- Music by: Kenta Higashiōji
- Studio: Studio A-Cat
- Licensed by: Crunchyroll: SEA: Plus Media Networks Asia
- Original network: Tokyo MX, BS11, AT-X, Wowow, ytv, Chukyo TV
- Original run: October 4, 2026 – present
- Episodes: 8

Reborn as a Space Mercenary: I Woke Up Piloting the Strongest Starship! (Japanese: 目覚めたら最強装備と宇宙船持ちだったので、一戸建て目指して傭兵として自由に生きたい, Hepburn: Mezametara Saikyō Sōbi to Uchūsen Mochi Datta no de, Ikkodate Mezashite Yōhei Toshite Jiyū ni Ikitai) is a Japanese light novel series written by Ryūto and illustrated by Tetsuhiro Nabeshima. It began serialization online in February 2019 on the user-generated novel publishing website Shōsetsuka ni Narō and is up to 605 episodes as of October 2026. It was later acquired by Fujimi Shobo, who have published seventeen volumes since July 2019 under their Kadokawa Books imprint. A manga adaptation with art by Shinichi Matsui has been serialized online via Kadokawa Corporation's ComicWalker website since November 2019 and has been collected in twelve tankōbon volumes. An anime television series adaptation produced by Studio A-Cat premiered in October 2026.

== Plot ==
One day, a man named Takahiro Satou mysteriously awakens in a world that is similar to his favorite science fiction video game. Now known by his in-game name Hiro, he becomes a powerful interstellar mercenary, and later attracts the attention of several women.

== Characters ==
Hiro (ヒロ)
Voiced by: Makoto Furukawa (Japanese); Kyle Phillips (English)
A mercenary who was formerly a man named Takahiro Satou from Earth, who was reborn in a world based on the video game Stella Online. His ship, the ASX-08 Krishna, is shown to be unbelievably powerful and he himself possesses powerful combat skills. Hiro has figured out that if he holds his breath that from his point of view, everything around him slows down. This includes when he is piloting the Krishna. He works as a free-ranging mercenary through the galaxy-wide guild. His goal is to buy a luxurious home on a planet. In time, he gains several female companions, who also become his love interests.
Mimi (ミミ)
Voiced by: Konomi Inagaki (Japanese); Emily Neves (English)
An orphan girl who is in debt due to her parents being killed in an accident that they were blamed for. Hiro hires her as his assistant. She also develops feelings for him. She desires to enjoy a variety of meals and gets along well with Chris.
Elma (エルマ, Eruma)
Voiced by: Anna Nagase (Japanese); Kelsey Cruz (English)
A space elf mercenary who works at the same mercenary guild as Hiro and Mimi. She also pilots a ship called the White Meteor, which is hard to control. However, after damaging her ship in an accident, she had to sell it along with her things to pay a massive fine for the damage. When she is still not able to fully pay, Hiro recruits her as a new member of his crew and so he can help her finish paying the fine and so she can buy a new ship. She also develops feelings for him, but is a little jealous of Chris.
Serena Holz (セレナ)
Voiced by: Haruka Shiraishi (Japanese); Jaclyn Thomas (English)
A daughter of the Marquise of Holz, she starts out as a lieutenant (navy) for the Imperial Space Force in the Grakkan Empire. She is also a skilled sword fighter. She also seems to have feelings for Hiro.
Shoko (ショーコ, Shōko)
Voiced by: Kana Ueda
A doctor from the Arein System. She seems to have feelings for Hiro after he saved her many times.
Mei (メイ)
Voiced by: Saori Ōnishi
Bariton
An imperial captain who is known to antagonize or threaten mercenaries.
Georg
A commander of the Imperial Space Force who serves Serena.
Christina Dalenwald/Chris
A noble girl whose parents were murdered by her evil uncle. After Hiro and his friends found her, she joined them and hired Hiro to protect her. She also appears to have feelings for Hiro despite their different stats. Mimi gets along well with her, though Elma is somewhat jealous of her.
Friedrich Dalenwald
Chris's father, who was killed by Balthazar along with his wife after sacrificing himself to save his daughter's life.
Balthazar Dalenwald
Chris's evil uncle, who schemes to kill her and her parents. Though he manages to kill Friedrich and his wife, Chris escaped. He is now hunting Chris.

== Media ==
=== Light novel ===
Written by Ryūto, Reborn as a Space Mercenary: I Woke Up Piloting the Strongest Starship! began serialization on the user-generated novel publishing website Shōsetsuka ni Narō on February 4, 2019. It was later acquired by Fujimi Shobo who began publishing it with illustrations by Tetsuhiro Nabeshima under their Kadokawa Books imprint on July 10, 2019. Eighteen volumes have been released as of October 9, 2026.

The light novels are licensed in English by Seven Seas Entertainment.

No.	Original release date	Original ISBN	North American release date	North American ISBN
1	July 10, 2019	978-4-04-073192-6	June 10, 2021 (digital); July 20, 2021 (print)	978-1-64827-420-6
2	January 10, 2020	978-4-04-073452-1	November 4, 2021 (digital); November 23, 2021 (print)	978-1-64827-444-2
3	July 10, 2020	978-4-04-073702-7	December 9, 2021 (digital); January 18, 2022 (print)	978-1-64827-469-5
4	December 10, 2020	978-4-04-073893-2	March 24, 2022 (digital); April 26, 2022 (print)	978-1-63858-196-3
5	May 8, 2021	978-4-04-074083-6	September 22, 2022 (digital); November 1, 2022 (print)	978-1-63858-648-7
6	October 8, 2021	978-4-04-074263-2	April 13, 2023 (digital); May 2, 2023 (print)	978-1-63858-961-7
7	March 10, 2022	978-4-04-074450-6	September 7, 2023 (digital); November 7, 2023 (print)	978-1-68579-661-7
8	August 10, 2022	978-4-04-074627-2	February 29, 2024 (digital); March 19, 2024 (print)	979-8-88843-437-6
9	January 10, 2023	978-4-04-074818-4	May 23, 2024 (digital); July 16, 2024 (print)	979-8-88843-872-5
10	May 10, 2023	978-4-04-074968-6	September 5, 2024 (digital); October 15, 2024 (print)	979-8-89160-069-0
11	October 10, 2023	978-4-04-075154-2	January 2, 2025 (digital); February 4, 2025 (print)	979-8-89160-580-0
12	April 10, 2024	978-4-04-075389-8	May 1, 2025 (digital); June 17, 2025 (print)	979-8-89373-166-8
13	September 10, 2024	978-4-04-075611-0	August 14, 2025 (digital); September 30, 2025 (print)	979-8-89373-914-5
14	February 10, 2025	978-4-04-075812-1	December 18, 2025 (digital); January 13, 2026 (print)	979-8-89561-738-0
15	July 10, 2025	978-4-04-075984-5	April 30, 2026 (digital); May 26, 2026 (print)	979-8-89765-399-7
16	December 10, 2025	978-4-04-076205-0	August 20, 2026 (digital); September 22, 2026 (print)	979-8-89863-227-4
17	May 9, 2026	978-4-04-076405-4	December 24, 2026 (digital); January 19, 2027 (print)	979-8-89863-524-4
18	October 9, 2026	978-4-04076-575-4	June 22, 2027	979-8-90209-534-7

=== Manga ===
A manga adaptation illustrated by Shinichi Matsui began serialization on Kadokawa Corporation's ComicWalker website on November 24, 2019. The manga's chapters have been collected by Media Factory into twelve tankōbon volumes as of October 2026.

The manga adaptation is also licensed in English by Seven Seas Entertainment.

No.	Original release date	Original ISBN	North American release date	North American ISBN
1	April 23, 2020	978-4-04-064341-0	August 24, 2021	978-1-64827-434-3
2	October 23, 2020	978-4-04-064984-9	December 14, 2021	978-1-64827-460-2
3	May 21, 2021	978-4-04-680421-1	June 21, 2022	978-1-63858-293-9
4	December 22, 2021	978-4-04-680965-0	December 6, 2022	978-1-63858-785-9
5	July 23, 2022	978-4-04-681533-0	June 27, 2023	978-1-68579-575-7
6	February 22, 2023	978-4-04-682162-1	January 16, 2024	979-8-88843-111-5
7	September 22, 2023	978-4-04-682814-9	June 18, 2024	979-8-88843-785-8
8	April 23, 2024	978-4-04-683628-1	March 25, 2025	979-8-89160-652-4
9	January 23, 2025	978-4-04-684398-2	July 22, 2025	979-8-89373-332-7
10	September 22, 2025	978-4-04-685013-3	March 31, 2026	979-8-89765-357-7
11	March 23, 2026	978-4-04-685763-7	October 20, 2026	979-8-89863-228-1
12	October 23, 2026	978-4-04-660559-7	—	—

=== Anime ===
An anime adaptation was announced on February 6, 2025. It was later confirmed to be a television series produced by Studio A-Cat and directed by Norihiko Nagahama, with Takamitsu Kōno handling series composition, Masami Sueoka designing the characters, and Kenta Higashioji composing the music. It premiered on October 4, 2026, on Tokyo MX and other networks. The opening theme song is "Unstoppable" performed by Flow, and the ending theme song is "My Way" performed by Asterism. Crunchyroll will stream the series. Plus Media Networks Asia licensed the series in Southeast Asia for broadcast on Aniplus Asia.

==== Episodes ====
No.	Title	Directed by	Written by	Storyboarded by	Original release date
1	"First Space Colony Visit"; Transliteration: "Hajimete no Supēsu Koronī" (Japanese: はじめてのスペースコロニー)	Norihiko Nagahama	Takamitsu Kōno	Takehiro Nakayama	October 4, 2026
A spaceship operated by a man named Hiro and his three female companions engages two enemy ships, eventually defeating them and collecting whatever valuables are inside them using salvage drones. The story then flashes back. A man from Earth wakes up as Hiro, who is on a spaceship in the middle of a galaxy. After learning how to operate the ship, he learns that he is in a world based on the video game Stella Online where he is a mercenary. The spaceship is called the ASX-08 Krishna. Being very knowledgeable about the game, he further tests out his ship's functions, weapons, and defenses. As he searches for things to collect and sell, three other spaceships flown by wanted space pirates arrive to steal his cargo. Hiro battles them and eventually defeats them. He then deploys salvage drones to collect cargo from the surviving enemy ship and heads to a space station, using his new name to identify himself so he can dock on the station. While being interrogated over how he got the cargo, a woman named Serena Holz arrives, unfamiliar with his ship and learning that he defeated some pirates. She agrees to buy the cargo from him, and Hiro claims that he lost his memory following an accident, making Serena at first think he's a spy, which he denies. After learning how much supplies costs, he decides to start working at the station's mercenary guild, though he is aware that this world has things that the game doesn't, such as the Grakkan Empire, whom Serena works for, and the Belbellum Federation. While exploring a city in the space station, he meets a space elf named Elma, who is also a mercenary. After easily passing a test in the mercenary guild, he is deemed a gold ranked mercenary, but is instead put on the bronze rank due to lack of accomplishments, though Elma gets jealous as she couldn't reach silver rank for years. The two nevertheless form a partnership. After seeing a girl being attacked by some thugs and other people ignoring it due to it being common here, Hiro still chooses to help the girl regardless.
2	"Mimi the Girl"; Transliteration: "Shōjo Mimi" (Japanese: 少女・ミミ)	Unknown	Unknown	TBA	October 11, 2026
After rescuing the girl, whose name is Mimi, Hiro and Elma bring her to a restaurant, wondering what to do with her. Hiro eventually decides to have Mimi join him and learns from her that her parents were killed in an accident, but they were blamed for it, which forced Mimi to quit school and find work to pay for the damages, so Hiro agrees to hire her. Mimi is given new clothes from Elma and a personal room on the Kirshna by Hiro. Mimi later visits Hiro in his room to seduce him as she appears to have developed feelings for him. The next day, Hiro buys mercenary's clothes for Mimi and has her register for a job at the mercenary guild. The two meet up with Elma and the other mercenaries for a mission commandeered by Serena: hunting a group of space pirates at a hidden base. While on their way to the base, Hiro sees that Elma is piloting a very difficult to control ship called the White Meteor. During the raid, the pirate base is destroyed and Hiro easily destroys the pirate ships, using the debris to hide his presence. Elma loses control of her ship and accidentally hits the side of Serena's ship. Though this does minor damage to Serena's ship, Elma's ship is wrecked, though Elma survives. With the mission over, the group all return to the space station. Hiro has also obtained a crystal among the destroyed pirate ships and makes plans to buy a family home on a planet. Later, Elma is seen drinking wine in an alleyway.
3	"Elma"	Unknown	Unknown	TBA	October 18, 2026
Elma is given a massive fine for the damages she caused during the mission and is warned about a deadline. Elma then spends her time drinking wine in the alleyway, unable to pay. Hiro on the other hand sleeps with Mimi at his side on the Krishna, though Mimi is embarrassed. The two begin the next part of their plan and go to get their rewards. They also learn about Elma's situation and that she will be forced into prison labor if she cannot pay for the damages. Hiro decides to help her if possible and is then given a tour around the space station. They eventually find a drunk Elma, who sold everything she had along with her ship, but it was still not enough to pay for the damages and the deadline is today. Hiro invites Elma to join him and will help finish paying the fine, and she agrees. Meanwhile, Serena is still trying to identify Hiro and learns that a captain named Bariton placed the deadline for Elma's fine and moved it closer against Serena's orders. She then learns that Elma's fine was paid in full and Bariton was dealt with by Hiro. Later, Hiro registers Elma as part of his crew and Mimi's mentor. Elma then begins teaching Mimi how to shoot a gun. During a meal, Hiro explains his plan to buy a planet with a family home. During a bath, Elma reveals to Mimi that she has developed feelings for Hiro. Elma later visits Hiro in his room to seduce him and Hiro warns her about the dangers of piloting a ship like the White Meteor.
4	"A New Daily Life"; Transliteration: "Atarashī Nichijō" (Japanese: 新しい日常)	Unknown	Unknown	TBA	October 25, 2026
After spending the night with Elma, Mimi reveals to Hiro that she enjoys Elma's company, though Elma gets jealous of Mimi's doting on Hiro, even though they get along well. The trio take down more space pirates and get a large reward as they continue to work together as friends. They then go shopping and visit bars and restaurants, where they end up buying lots of cola, though it is not the same as Earth's. While having a meal on the Krishna, Mimi makes it her goal to enjoy lots of yummy food just as much as Hiro wants a luxurious home on a planet and Elma wants her own ship again. Elma and Mimi begin seducing Hiro again. Meanwhile, Serena is trying to figure out the true motivations of the Belbellum Federation. Later, Hiro's group find no sign of any pirates, but then discover mining ships who are targeting them, revealing that they are Belbellum Federation warships in disguise. They manage to destroy the warships and salvage one of the ships, discovering a strange electrical box in one of them. Showing this box to Serena, she deducts that an invasion is approaching and they need mercenaries to join the military to combat the enemy ships. She is able to convince Hiro's group to join, though Mimi and Elma aren't too happy with this. The other mercenaries get jealous of Hiro as they learn about the approaching Federation force, which may be harder to defeat than space pirates. Hiro has an idea on how to deal with the enemy fleet and intends to confront them alone. Serena agrees with this plan.
5	"The Singing Crystal"; Transliteration: "Utau Suishō" (Japanese: 歌う水晶)	TBA	TBA	TBA	November 1, 2026
Elma isn't happy with Hiro's decision, but she and Mimi still choose to help him regardless despite the risk. The three join Serena's fleet as they prepare to engage the Belbellum Federation warships. Hiro's ship gets close to the enemy ships without detection and while the enemy ships are focused on Serena's fleet. After cleverly eluding the enemy fleet's radar and holding his breath so that things seem to slow down around him, he shoots at them unexpectedly from a different position. Hiro fires a torpedo with the crystal from earlier taped to it, destroying one of the ships and triggering a shockwave before the enemy ships can shoot them down. This also summons crystalized creatures that resembles ships to attack the enemy fleet. After Hiro destroys most of the enemy ships, Serena's fleet join the battle and wipes out the remaining Federation forces. The group later get their reward, but it is not enough for Hiro to buy a new home. Though Serena tries to get him to join the Grakkan Empire, he declines as he wishes to remain a mercenary. Serena respects his choice, but Mimi and Elma suspect that Serena has feelings for him. However, people think he has joined the Empire due to a rumor spread by Serena. Not wanting to be a part of this, Hiro decides to leave as even though he'll get good payment for joining the Empire, it will also cost him his freedom. He, Mimi, and Elma plan to move to the Arein Star System. Serena tells her uncle about the recent events and intends to eliminate all the remaining pirates and hunt down Hiro. On the Krishna, Mimi and Elma question each other about Hiro's true characteristics before going to see him later.
6	"The Arein System"; Transliteration: "Arein Seikei'nite" (Japanese: アレイン星系にて)	TBA	TBA	TBA	November 8, 2026
Hiro and his friends defeat some space pirates threatening a passenger ship on its way to the Arein System. After they dock there, Hiro learns that they must undergo checkups while there. Elma suspects that Hiro is lying about who is really is and his amnesia, and Hiro reveals that he is actually a reincarnated human from Earth. Elma still accepts him, and they and Mimi head to the hospital and meet a doctor named Shoko, who thanks them for saving her life as she was one of the passengers from the ship that they saved earlier. She has them get inside some capsules without clothing for analysis. After that, Shoko sees that Hiro's amnesia is not an issue, but he isn't normal. Shoko requests for some of Hiro's genes via blood and semen. After the checkup, she has them rest for three days, but her reports leaves Elma in shock. Back on the Krishna, Elma had learned from the results that she can get pregnant and collapses next to Hiro; she grows increasingly embarrassed of this when Hiro constantly brings it up. The group tour the place and find settling and unsettling sights. Hiro later rescues Shoko from a cyborg man, having been ambushed by more of them earlier. The cyborgs had taken her case, which contains Hiro's genes. Luckily, the case cannot be opened so easily and has a tracker. She leaves with the authorities after that. Serena later finds them and reveals that she was promoted thanks to Hiro's actions, having formed imperial forces to eliminate space pirates. She requests for Hiro to help teach her his methods on hunting pirates. Hiro isn't willing to as he still doesn't want to be taken advantage of, but his friends and Serena eventually convince him to help; however, he still desires his freedom. Serena understands and leaves, but is still determined to ensure that Hiro helps her in the future. Meanwhile, Shoko is busy creating a new type of organism using Hiro's genes, which she and the authorities had recovered from the cyborgs.
7	"The Pirate-Hunting Unit"; Transliteration: "Tai Chūzoku Dokuritsu Kantai" (Japanese: 対宙賊独立艦隊)	TBA	TBA	TBA	November 15, 2026
Imperial ships converge on a gang of pirates attempting to raid a cargo ship. The pirates board the cargo ship, only to encounter armed robots instead of passengers. This was a trap laid by Hiro and Serena. After days of destroying many pirate ships, Serena is interested in learning how Hiro hunts pirates so easily. Later, Serena invites Hiro on a dinner date, wishing to talk to him more. Hiro agrees, but only if Mimi and Elma come too. Arriving at the resort, they enjoy a meal, but Serena becomes drunk with trying to convince Hiro to continue helping her hunt pirates. Hiro is still willing to do more jobs, but still doesn't want to job the military. After collapsing from getting drunk, they bring her back to the Krishna until she recovers. Serena continues to lead the imperial ships to take out more pirates with Hiro's group helping them. Later, Hiro's group return to the Arein System where they receive a distress signal; the colony is being attacked by unknown organisms. After landing there, Hiro commands a mech to investigate, but doesn't recall anything like this happening in the game. He fights and kills the creatures, remembering that they are from the factories he saw earlier. Hiro then encounters a creature that has human eyes that look identical to his. The creature is shown to be a tough fighter and is capable of regenerating. Hiro eventually kills it using a special grenade. He then meets Shoko, who thanks him for saving her again. Shoko reveals that her company was the one who made the creatures, which unintentionally turned hostile. Though Hiro considers inviting Shoko to join him, he reconsiders and leaves. Serena feels unhappy that she got left out of the situation, but nevertheless allows Hiro to take a vacation.
8	"Sleeping Beauty"	TBA	TBA	TBA	November 22, 2026
In the past, a young girl named Christina Dalenwald (or "Chris" for short) is put an stasis pod before her father Friedrich was killed by an unknown man and the pod is ejected into space. Back in the present, Hiro continues his plans to buy a luxurious seaside home and he, Elma, and Mimi do workouts on the Krishna. They encounter more enemy ships and after destroying them, they find the pod containing Chris. Bring the pod back to the space station, they identify the pod's origins and open it. Hiro is left to watch over Chris as she wakes up. She then reveals her background as a noble woman and after Hiro explains his side of the story, he vows to protect her. Chris reveals that her parents' murderer is her uncle Balthazar, who is still hunting her, though Hiro is asked to keep this conversation a secret as she can't bring outsiders into her issues, but Hiro cannot do that due to his promise, so Chris gives him her treasure in exchange for his help. Hiro introduces Chris to Mimi and Elma, and he discovers that he has been promoted to gold rank. Elma gets jealous of Chris and after Hiro tells them about Chris's past, he helps Chris send a message to her grandfather for help as she becomes a member of Hiro's crew. Elma helps make sure that no one can intercept the message while Mimi shows Chris around. Elma returns, but warns Hiro that she was being followed, though she manages to get away. Chris begins to fall for Hiro. They suspect that Elma's pursuers are working for Balthazar. Hiro makes plans to deal with the pursuers. Later, Chris visits Hiro's room to seduce him with Mimi's help, but Hiro warns her about how her grandfather will react to this given her noble background. The group head off for their vacation, unaware that Balthazar discovered their message.
9	"The Resort Planet Cierra III"	TBA	TBA	TBA	November 29, 2026

== Reception ==
By February 2025, the series had over 1.3 million copies in circulation.

== See also ==
- Dog & Scissors, another light novel series with the same illustrator
- From Old Country Bumpkin to Master Swordsman, another light novel series with the same illustrator
- Magudala de Nemure, another light novel series with the same illustrator
- Survival in Another World with My Mistress!, another light novel series with the same writer
