= Survival film =

Film genre depicting survival efforts

The survival film is a film genre in which one or more characters make an effort at physical survival. The genre focuses on characters' life-or-death struggles, often set against perilous circumstances. Survival films explore the human will to live, individual motivations, and personal desires, prompting audiences to reflect on broader aspects of humanity and personal values. They balance realism and believability with slow-burning suspense to maintain a sense of urgency. While some survival films may have epic scopes and lengthy running times, their effectiveness lies in creating an atmosphere where every moment poses a passive threat to the protagonist's existence.

Survival films are darker than most other adventure films and usually focus their storyline on a single character, usually the protagonist. The films tend to be "located primarily in a contemporary context", so film audiences are familiar with the setting, and the characters' activities are less romanticized.

In a 1988 book, Thomas Sobchack compared the survival film to romance film: "They both emphasize the heroic triumph over obstacles which threaten social order and the reaffirmation of predominant social values such as fair play and respect for merit and cooperation." The author said survival films "identify and isolate a microcosm of society", such as the surviving group from the plane crash in The Flight of the Phoenix (1965) or those on the overturned ocean liner in The Poseidon Adventure (1972). Sobchack explained, "Most of the time in a survival film is spent depicting the process whereby the group, cut off from the securities and certainties of the ordinary support networks of civilized life, forms itself into a functioning, effective unit." The group often varies in types of characters, sometimes to the point of caricature. While women have historically been stereotyped in such films, they "often play a decisive role in the success or failure of the group."

== List of films ==
Film	Year	Ref.
12 Years a Slave	2013	
The 33	2015	
127 Hours	2010	
2018	2023	
Adrift	2018	
Against the Sun	2014	
Alive	1993	
All Is Lost	2013	
Apollo 13	1995	
Arctic	2018	
Back from Eternity	1956	
Battle Royale	2000	
The Blue Lagoon	1980	
Buried	2010	
Captain Phillips	2013	
Cast Away	2000	
Centigrade	2020	
Cliffhanger	1993	
Cold Meat	2024	
Crawl	2019	
A Cry in the Wild	1990	
Cube	1997	
Dances with Wolves	1990	
Dante's Peak	1997	
The Day After Tomorrow	2004	
The Deep	2012	
Deliverance	1972	
The Descent	2005	
Eden	2024	
The Edge	1997	
The End We Start From	2023	
The Endurance: Shackleton's Legendary Antarctic Expedition	2000	
Escape from Alcatraz	1979	
Escape Room	2019	
Everest	2015	
Fall	2022	
First Blood	1982	
Five Came Back	1939	
The Flight of the Phoenix	1965	
Frozen	2010	
Gerald's Game	2017	
Gravity	2013	
Green Room	2015	
The Grey	2011	
A Hijacking	2012	
I Am Legend	2007	
The Impossible	2012	
In the Heart of the Sea	2015	
Inferno	1953	
Infinite Storm	2022	
Into the Wild	2007	
Iron Will	1994	
Jaws	1975	
Jeremiah Johnson	1971	
Jungle	2017	
Jurassic Park	1993	
Kon-Tiki	2012	
Last Breath	2025	
Life of Pi	2012	
Lifeboat	1944	
Lone Survivor	2013	
Lord of the Flies	1963	
Lost on a Mountain in Maine	2024	
Marooned	1969	
The Martian	2015	
Man in the Wilderness	1971	
Meek's Cutoff	2010	
Misery	1990	
My Side of the Mountain	1969	
The Naked Prey	1965	
No Blade of Grass	1970	
Nobody Wants the Night	2015	
North Face	2008	
Nowhere	2023	
The Omega Man	1971	
On the Beach	1959	
Open Water	2003	
Oxygen	2021	
Panic in Year Zero!	1962	
Panic Room	2002	
The Perfect Storm	2000	
Planet of the Apes	1968	
The Poseidon Adventure	1972	
Predator	1987	
Quest for Fire	1981	
A Quiet Place	2018	
A Quiet Place: Day One	2024	
Rabbit-Proof Fence	2002	
Red Dawn	1984	
Rescue Dawn	2006	
Resident Evil	2002	
The Revenant	2015	
The Road	2009	
Robinson Crusoe	1954	
Robinson Crusoe on Mars	1965	
Room	2015	
Sanctum	2011	
Sands of the Kalahari	1965	
The Savage Is Loose	1974	
The Secret Land	1948	
Seven Waves Away	1957	
The Shallows	2016	
Sisu	2022	
The Snow Walker	2003	
Society of the Snow	2023	
Southern Comfort	1981	
Soylent Green	1973	
Stranded: I've Come from a Plane that Crashed in the Mountains	2007	
Sukkwan Island	2025	
Survival Quest	1989	
Swiss Family Robinson	1960	
Teenage Caveman	1958	
The Terminator	1984	
Terminator 2: Judgement Day	1991	
Titanic	1997	
Thirteen Lives	2022	
Touching the Void	2003	
Tremors	1990	
The Ultimate Warrior	1975	
Underwater	2020	
Vertical Limit	2000	
The War Game	1965	
Walkabout	1971	
The Way Back	2010	
White Water Summer	1987	
Wild	2014	
The World, the Flesh and the Devil	1959	
Z.P.G.	1972	

== See also ==
- Battle royale genre
- List of apocalyptic films
- List of disaster films

== Bibliography ==
- Sobchack, Thomas (1988). "The Adventure Film". In Gehring, Wes D (ed.). Handbook of American Film Genres. Greenwood. ISBN 978-0-313-24715-6.
