= Letters from the Fire (EP) =

EP by Letters from the Fire
- Released: August 19, 2014
- Recorded: 2014
- Genre: Hard rock
- Length: 17:18
- Label: Street Smart Recordings
- Producer: Chris Taylor Brown

Letters from the Fire chronology
Rebirth (2011)	Letters from the Fire (2014)	Worth the Pain (2016)

Letters from the Fire is the second EP from American hard rock band Letters from the Fire. Released on 19 August 2014, the work was produced by Chris Taylor Brown and published via Street Smart Recordings.

== Background ==
After the September 2012 Around The World…Beneath The Scars tour with 12 Stones and the Letter Black, the band and its lead vocalist parted ways. In May 2013, Elliot Weber joined the ensemble as the new lead vocalist.

== Composition ==
Weber wrote the track "Zombies in the Sun" with guitarist Mike Keller during their second day in the studio. Without knowing any of the band members very well, the intro riff from Keller triggers Weber's feelings about his personal encounters with loved ones addicted to heroin, some of whom have passed on as a result of using the drug. Weber stated:

"I began writing metaphorically, acknowledging ones struggle with the drug, but soon found myself very angry in thought. I'm sure many can relate, seeing a kind, honest soul be taken away, and have such poison dilute their reality. It truly effects everyone around them, and users are completely unaware yet aware at times what they’re doing. My friends and loved ones turned into completely different people, doing things I'd never thought they do, and in some instances, the addiction took their lives. 'Zombies in the Sun' is a song that's a call to action, cause I'm sick of losing good people to addiction. I'm expressing to all who struggle with this disease, to wake up, come back to reality and resurrect their souls."

== Promotion ==
In early 2014, their cover version of "Eleanor Rigby" was published, ranking No. 41 on Active Rock Radio and No.11 on Under The Radar. The song "Zombies in the Sun" was released to radio in 2014, with a music video published through Revolver Magazine in August of that year.

== Critical reception ==
Vandala Magazine stated that "Letters From The Fire seamlessly infiltrate ferocious riffs into ethereal melodies creating a contagious concoction of dark and ambient hard rock", going on to say that "A sound captured in poetry by the resonating lyrics of vocalist and newest member, Elliot Weber, Letters From The Fire kindle a dynamic energy that is matched only in their live performance". Brian Campbell of Starpulse portrays the work as "Channeling the modern rock stylings of Trapt and Edgewater, Letters From the Fire, a band once fronted by former Candiria singer Carley Coma, deliver a stunning collection of rock entries, a record that, while criminally short clocking in under 20 minutes, offers no shortage of standout tracks." Campbell describes the song "Eleanor Rigby" as "one of the best versions of this song you’ll hear this side of Godhead", stating that "The tremendous cover is flanked by robust, emotional songwriting, immersive hooks and stirring engrossing guitars".

== Track listing ==
No.	Title	Length
1.	"Zombies in the Sun"	3:32
2.	"Eleanor Rigby"	2:50
3.	"This Moment"	3:21
4.	"Waiting"	4:12
5.	"Zombies in the Sun" (acoustic)	3:23
Total length:		17:18
