= Doom: Annihilation =

2019 film directed by Tony Giglio

- Home video release cover
- Directed by: Tony Giglio
- Screenplay by: Tony Giglio
- Based on: Doom by id Software
- Produced by: Jeffery Beach; Phillip J. Roth; Ogden Gavanski
- Starring: Amy Manson; Dominic Mafham; Luke Allen-Gale; Nina Bergman
- Cinematography: Alexander Krumov
- Edited by: Peter Mergus
- Music by: Frederik Wiedmann
- Production companies: Universal 1440 Entertainment; Di Bonaventura Pictures; Battle Mountain Films
- Distributed by: Universal Pictures Home Entertainment
- Release date: October 1, 2019
- Running time: 96 minutes
- Country: United States
- Language: English

Doom: Annihilation is a 2019 American science fiction action horror film based on the video game series of the same name developed by id Software. Directed and written by Tony Giglio, it is a reboot and the second live-action film in the franchise, after Doom (2005). The film stars Amy Manson, Dominic Mafham, Luke Allen-Gale, and Nina Bergman. In the film, marines battle demon-like creatures in a facility on Phobos, who have emerged from ancient teleportation devices known as "Gates".

Giglio pitched his idea for a new film to Universal in 2015, but was initially turned down. The success of the 2016 video game convinced Universal to proceed and commission a script from Giglio. The project was announced in April 2018, with principal photography commencing soon afterward, and ending in June, with additional photography following in early 2019. id Software publicly iterated that they were not involved with the film since they had earlier declined an invitation to participate in its production.

Doom: Annihilation was released direct-to-video on October 1, 2019, to mixed reviews and earned $78,389 (~$98,713 in 2025) in domestic video sales.

A reboot is in development.

== Plot ==
On a United Aerospace Corporation (UAC) base on Phobos, Dr. Betruger prepares to teleport a volunteer from a UAC lab in Nevada to Phobos by using ancient teleporters known as "Gates". The experiment proves successful, but the subject emerges partially deformed and insane. On a UAC transport vessel, a group of marines on a mission to guard the Phobos base awaken from cryosleep. Amongst them is Joan Dark, a disgraced lieutenant the other marines are reluctant to work with. Joining them is Bennett Stone, a scientist, and ex-boyfriend of Joan. Against Dr. Kahn's wishes, Betruger prepares to teleport himself to the Nevada base. After preparations by medic Veronica, Betruger passes through the Gate. However, the Phobos base suddenly goes offline as monsters emerge from the Gate.

Unable to communicate with or enter the base, the Marines receive orders to investigate and restore power. They enter via the emergency entrance and Bennett discovers that the reserve power has been drained to two percent, granting them 90 minutes before the fusion reactor goes critical and explodes. The marines are then attacked by UAC staff who have been turned into zombie-like creatures. During the attack, the marines find three survivors: Betruger, Veronica, and the base's Chaplain, Glover. Betruger reveals that the UAC has been studying the Gates for 30 years in order to colonize planets. It is believed that the Gates were left by an ancient alien race while Glover believes them to be demons. Against Betruger's wishes, Joan orders the remaining marines and survivors to evacuate the base.

Upon returning to the transport, the crew is attacked by Imp-like demons, killing several marines, including Glover. With the transport disabled, Joan agrees to Betruger's plan to restore power to use the Gate to teleport the survivors to the Nevada base. Soon, she reveals to Bennett that her agreement was a ruse to restore communications. As Bennett restores the base's power, Betruger reveals that Joan was disgraced for allowing a terrorist to go free due to poor judgment. Betruger then kills Veronica and seals the marines in the power server, who are then attacked by Imps. With only Joan and Bennett left standing, they plan to stop Betruger from activating the Gate.

After Joan acquires the BFG 9000, Bennett is attacked by an Imp. As Joan shoots her way to the Gate chamber, she is attacked by a zombified Bennett, forcing her to kill him. Joan then shoots Betruger, who resurrects immediately and pushes Joan into the Gate. Joan is teleported to hell, where she encounters a horde of Imps and Stanga, their overlord. Stanga reveals that they plan to destroy the universe and annihilate all life on it. Joan shoots him and blasts the horde with plasma grenades as she makes her way back to the Gate. She is then teleported to the Nevada base and demands that the Gate be shut down. She is apprehended and sedated by security. Before she loses consciousness, the Gate begins to reactivate. Dr. Kahn believes it to be Betruger coming through. As the film cuts to black, a growl is heard.

== Cast ==
- Amy Manson (credited as Amy Mason) as Lieutenant Joan Dark
  - Agleya Gumnerova as Young Joan Dark
- Dominic Mafham as Dr. Malcolm Betruger
- Luke Allen-Gale as Dr. Bennett Stone
- James Weber Brown as Captain Hector Savage
- Clayton Adams as Private Steven Winslow
- Nina Bergman as Private Carley Corbin
- Amar Chadha-Patel as Private Rance Redguo
- Gavin Brocker as Sergeant Harold “Harry” Friesen
- Chidi Ajufo as Sergeant Logan Akua
- Hari Dhillon as Dr. Ahmed Kahn
- Katrina Nare as Dr. Veronica Cyr
- Arkie Reece as Captain Fadel Tarek
- Jemma Moore as Private Li Chen
- Louis Mandylor as Chaplain Glover
- Gina Philips as Daisy (voice)
- Cassidy Little as Morgan
- Plamena Bozhilova as Olivia Dark
- Lorina Kamburova as Dr. Sandy Peterson
- Nathan Cooper as Dr. Ezekiel Barnes

== Production ==
In an October 2005 interview, executive producer John Wells stated that a second Doom film would be put into production if the first was a box office success. In March 2011, reports emerged that Universal Pictures was developing a 3D film reboot of Doom, due to the success of G.I. Joe: The Rise of Cobra.

In 2015, director Tony Giglio pitched to Universal his outline for a new Doom film. Universal declined due to the film not being on its slate and due to the financial disappointment of the 2005 film. After the release of the 2016 video game, Giglio re-pitched the idea to Universal by revealing the game's sales numbers and new interest in the property from old and new fans. Convinced, the company demanded to see a script first. A 25-page treatment was then written by Giglio. Giglio said the previous film lacked demons, hell, and proper usage of the Gates and wished to prioritize those elements for the new film.

Giglio created the character Joan after taking inspiration from The Terminator and Aliens, feeling that a female protagonist can be effective in a sci-fi action film. Joan was named after Joan of Arc. Four suits were produced for the Imps, with one designed for leaping. Inspiration was drawn from the first three Doom games, as Universal did not retain the rights to the Bethesda version. Universal invited Bethesda to participate in the film; however, Bethesda respectfully declined and wished the production well. In April 2018, Universal revealed plans for a direct-to-video reboot of Doom, to be produced by its Universal 1440 Entertainment subsidiary. Nina Bergman confirmed her participation in an Instagram post. Autonomous FX was commissioned to work on the special effects, makeup, and demon designs. The Imps were redesigned to have charred skin and sharp edges for more organic-like horns, while retaining the glowing eyes and wide mouth of the original design.

=== Filming ===
Principal photography wrapped in Bulgaria in June 2018. Additional photography commenced in early 2019 to improve certain scenes and visual effects. The film used 1,000 visual effects shots. The Hell sequence was shot with Amy Manson standing before a green screen, and a small rock area was built for the water scenes.

== Release ==
=== Marketing ===
In March 2019, Universal revealed images, a synopsis, a potential release date, and revealed the film's official title as Doom: Annihilation. That same month, the first trailer was released. The trailer received negative reactions from fans, with id Software confirming it was not involved with the film. Giglio admitted to not being enthusiastic about the first trailer since at the time only 80 effects out of the 1,000 effects shots were complete for marketing to use. Giglio noted the second trailer was better received, stating, "Once the fans saw the second teaser, I think we got a few more people saying: 'Oh, wait a minute. That's not what I thought the movie was gonna be.'"

=== Home media ===
Doom: Annihilation was released on Blu-ray, DVD, and digital formats on October 1, 2019. The film was originally scheduled to be released in April. On December 25, the film was made available on Netflix. In the United States and Canada, the DVD earned $5,120 and the Blu-ray earned $75,404, totaling $80,524 in domestic video sales.

=== Critical response ===
On Rotten Tomatoes, the film has an approval rating of 43% based on seven reviews, with an average rating of 5/10. Alex Kane from Forbes called the film "good, trashy fun", praising the action scenes, special effects, Manson's performance, and improvements over the 2005 film, but criticized the production value. Martin Liebman from Blu-Ray.com called the film "a horribly dull action film", criticizing the acting, script, and production design. Jay Krieger from Cultured Vultures said that the film feels "fan-made" and "disappointingly inadequate", criticizing the plot, Easter eggs, characters, and inferiority to the 2005 film. Tom Jorgensen from IGN gave the film a 3 out of 10 and criticized the action, characters, plot, unoriginality, humor, visual effects, and cinematography. Jay Gervais from Dead Entertainment called the film "unsurprisingly terrible", criticizing the characters as "unlikable and forgettable", the film's emphasis on zombies rather than demons, repetitive action, and lacking the appealing qualities of the games. Gervais recommended to "skip it".

Mike Sprague of JoBlo.com gave the film 7/10 stars, praising the film's action, improvement over the 2005 film, and called the film "watchable". William Bibbiani from Bloody Disgusting called the film "a modest, but effective sci-fi action thriller", calling it better than most game adaptations, stating, "Doom: Annihilation isn't one of the bad ones." Phil Wheat of Nerdly said the film was one of the better game adaptations, praising the Easter eggs, characters, ideas over the 2005 film, and directing. John Noonan from Horror News called the film a "colossal waste of time", praising the Easter eggs but criticizing the lack of fun, scares, action, gore, and its slow pace.

== Franchise ==
=== Cancelled sequel ===
Director Tony Giglio stated in December 2019 that he had originally pitched It as the first installment of a trilogy and that there had been preliminary discussions about a sequel. He said the follow-up would have followed the lore of the games and brought Hell to Earth. Giglio also confirmed that Doomguy would have appeared in the sequel, and that he had a wishlist of demons he wanted to include, although no specific creatures had been finalized.

Despite Giglio's plans, the sequel never received a formal greenlight and was not developed.

=== Reboot ===
In May 2020, it was reported that Universal Pictures was developing a new Doom film as a reboot of the franchise, with a tie-in television series also reportedly planned. The film was reportedly intended to be more closely aligned with the original 1993 video game, while the television series would expand the franchise's story.

In January 2026, it was reported that Universal was again developing a new Doom film. The report originated from entertainment scooper MyTimeToShineHello, who claimed on January 9 that a new film based on the video game franchise was in development. Universal had not officially announced the project, and no director, cast, or release date had been confirmed.
