= Nina Bergman =

Danish actor

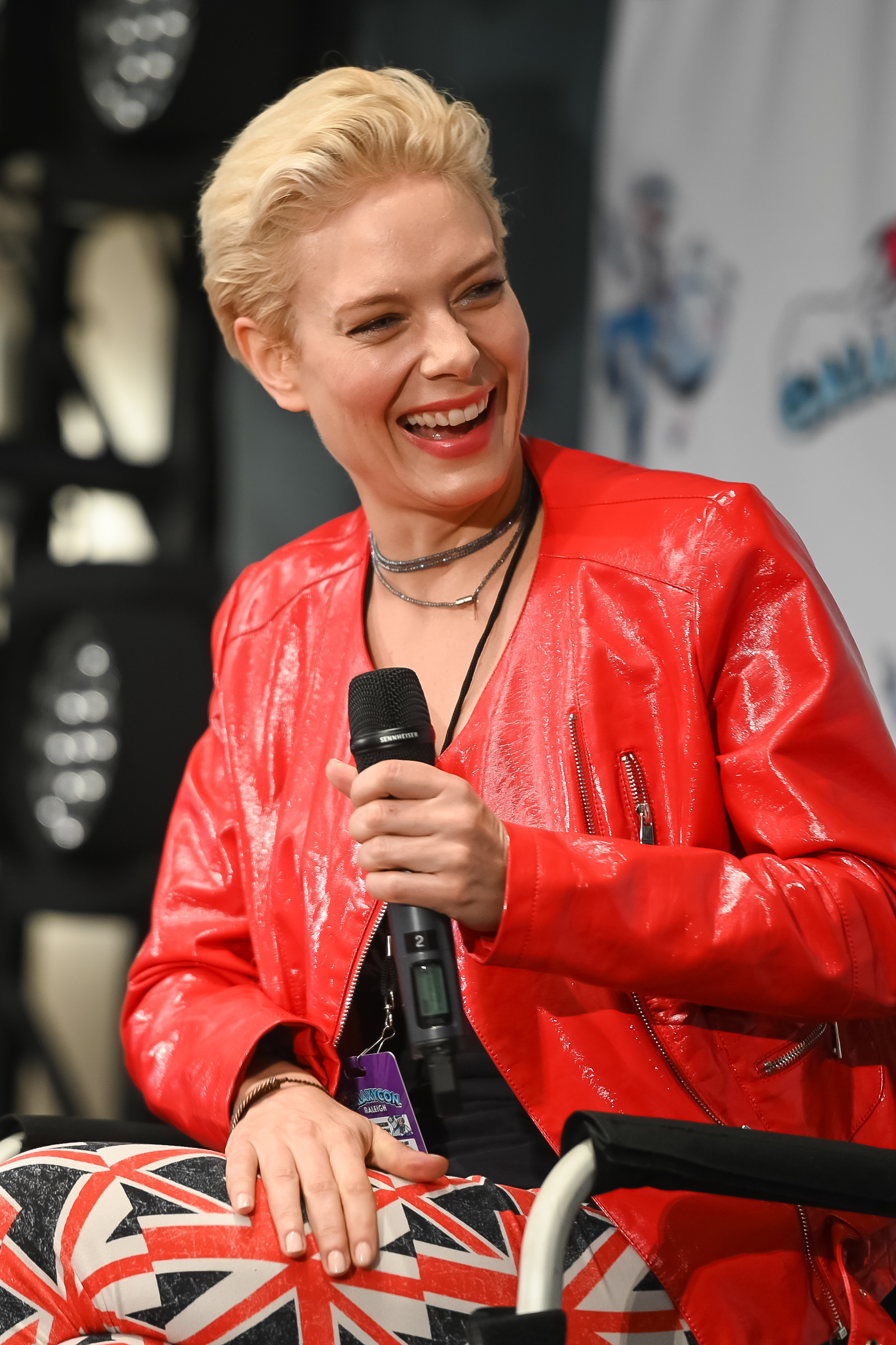
- Bergman at GalaxyCon Raleigh in 2021
- Born: Copenhagen, Denmark
- Occupations: Actress; singer; songwriter; model
- Years active: 1993–present
- Relatives: Pavel Kadochnikov (grandfather)
- Musical career
- Instruments: Vocals; songwriter
- Years active: 2005–present

Nina Bergman is a Danish actress, singer, songwriter, and model. She appeared in the films Doom: Annihilation, Cold Meat, and Chief of Station. She was the lead singer in the band Letters from the Fire.

== Early life and education ==
Nina Bergman is the granddaughter of renowned Russian actor Pavel Kadochnikov. Her grandmother was an opera singer and actress, and her father is a film school professor in Denmark. Bergman spent her early childhood traveling across Europe with her Russian Gypsy grandparents. She started in the arts, dancing, at the age of four.

At the age of 14, Bergman received a scholarship to the Urdang Academy in London to study musical theater. A year later, she continued her education at the prestigious Bolshoi Theater in Moscow in ballet before moving to New York City, where she attended NYU's Tisch School of the Arts. During this time, she signed with her first agent, leading to roles in plays, films, commercials, and to modeling work. Bergman later relocated to Los Angeles.

Bergman speaks English, Danish, Russian, Swedish, and Norwegian.

== Career ==
Bergman's career has multiple facets: Actress, rock band singer, and model.

=== Film ===
Sometimes described as an "adrenaline junkie", Bergman took up amateur boxing to make ends meet in New York, which would later help her secure action roles in films such as Universal Pictures's The Car: Road to Revenge (a remake of the 1977 horror-film) and Doom: Annihilation. She played lead-roles in Hell Hath no Fury, directed by Jesse V. Johnson, as a French resistance fighter and in Seize the Night, as "GG", a character based on a 1990s goth singer.

Her most recent work includes a supporting role in the thriller Chief of Station, starring Aaron Eckhart, and a lead-role in the horror film Cold Meat, co-starring Allen Leech, which premiered in 2023 at FrightFest in London. She is also set to appear in Deathstalker, an adaptation of Roger Corman's cult classic, for which she wrote and performed the end-credit song.

Bergman's performance as the assassin Trinidad in Assassin X earned her an Honorable Mention Award for Best Actress at the AOF International Film Festival.

Bergman portrayed Wonder Woman in a short fan-film directed by Jesse V. Johnson, co-starring Timothy V. Murphy and Marina Sirtis, and appeared in The Wayshower alongside Peter Stormare and Eric Roberts. Her work also includes an ad-piece titled Skeet Art by the Freise Brothers and Biscuit Filmworks for the Know new Art campaign for the 16th annual Newport Beach Film Festival.

=== Filmography ===
Year	Title	Role	Notes
1993	The Melody of Love	Dancer	
2002	XX/XY	Supporting	
2007	The Other End of the Line	Wife	
2007	Catacombs	Singer	
2010	Black Limousine	Tracee	
2011	The Wayshower	Nina	
2016	Assassin X	Trinidad	
2017	The Beautiful Ones	Girl in the Red Dress	
2017	[in]visible	Bug	Short film
2017	Marathon Bout	Swiss Wrench	Short film
2019	The Car: Road to Revenge	Ash	
2019	Doom: Annihilation	Carley	
2019	NYX	Esther	Short film
2021	Hell Hath No Fury	Marie	
2022	Seize the Night	GG	
2022	Words	Gloria Miller	Short film
2022	Don't Try This at Home	Nina	
2024	Cold Meat	Ana	
2024	Chief of Station	Hitchens	
2025	Deathstalker	Grendul	

=== Video-games ===
Bergman's likeness was used for the character Erin "Battery" Baker in the 2018 video game Call of Duty: Black Ops 4.

=== Television and reality television ===
Bergman has been featured in comedic sketches on The Late Late Show with Craig Ferguson, The Late Late Show with James Corden, The Tonight Show with Jay Leno, and has hosted programs for E! Entertainment, Fuse, and The Grammys, where she served as a trophy presenter. Bergman's reality TV credits include Battleground Earth, starring Ludacris and Tommy Lee, and the Danish reality series Danske Hollywoodfruer.

=== Music career ===
While studying musical theater at Tisch School of the Arts, Bergman discovered foundational influences in the works of musical artists Linkin Park and NIN. She began her music career singing in underground bands, and, upon learning that her favorite underground band Kidneythieves lost their lead singer, moved to LA to pursue joining that band. Several members of Kidneythieves joined with Bergman to form the band Shocknina, which toured and released an EP. Shocknina provided Bergman with the experience she needed to launch her own band, Dead Rose Beauty, which toured with rock legends like Meat Loaf and the Scorpions. She honed her musical presentation in clubs on the Sunset Strip and in other local clubs. Bergman subsequently fronted the band Letters from the Fire from 2017-2019.

Bergman's theatrical agent introduced her to musician Paul Anka, who managed her music career and helped her secure a six-album deal with Warner Bros. Records under Rob Cavallo as the solo project N.I.N.A..

==== Bands ====
- Shocknina (2005-2007)
- Dead Rose Beauty (2007-2010)
- Letters from the Fire (2017-2019)
- N.I.N.A. (2019-present)

==== Soundtracks ====
Bergman has contributed to numerous film soundtracks, including Lionsgate's Catacombs, Repo! The Genetic Opera, and Sharknado 3. She also performed the end-credit song for Black Limousine and provided vocals for All about her.

Bergman has written over 100 songs.

==== Live-events ====
Bergman has performed live at major events, including the World Series and the NCAA College Football season.

==== Music videos ====
Bergman's work in music videos includes starring roles in Gnarls Barkley's "Gone Daddy Gone", Sick Puppies' "All the Same", and Trey Songz's "Foreigner".

=== Modeling ===
Bergman has appeared in over 30 commercials and numerous print campaigns, working with brands such as La Perla, Apple, Sprite, Nike, and Nature Valley. She gained some widespread recognition for her roles in Dos Equis' "The most-interesting Man in the World" campaign, Carl's Jr.'s Beyond Meat commercial, and as a spokesperson in one of the Saxx Underwear "Balls" commercials.

== Personal life and off-screen work ==
Beyond her entertainment career, Bergman is a dedicated animal rights activist and a vegan. She actively supports various charities and advocates for the ethical treatment of animals. In June 2025, she delivered a TEDx talk titled "Vegan Machine" at TEDxPacific Avenue, where she discussed the intersection of her plant-based lifestyle and her career. Bergman is also an "avid motorcycle rider". She "owns and ride[s] a[n] 883 Harley Sportster and has a custom Bobber".
