= Letters from the Fire (album) =

Studio album by Letters from the Fire
- Released: June 15, 2018
- Recorded: 2017–2018
- Genre: Hard rock
- Length: 36:07
- Label: Sand Hill Records
- Producer: Colin Brittain

Letters from the Fire chronology
| Worth the Pain (2016) | Letters from the Fire (2018) |

Letters from the Fire is the second and final studio album from American hard rock band Letters from the Fire. It was released on 15 June 2018 through Sand Hill Records and is the first studio album to feature vocalist Nina Bergman.

== Background ==
In mid 2017, rhythm guitar Mike Keller mentioned that the group planned to begin tracking their next studio album at the end of that year. In late 2017, vocalist Alexa Kabazie and drummer Brian Sumwalt parted ways with the band, with Nina Bergman and former Children 18:3 percussionist Seth Hostetter replacing them on vocals and percussion, respectively. Two weeks later, the ensemble posted their intention to begin recording that December with producer Colin Brittain.

In early April 2018, Bergman announced that "Comfort You", the first single from the album, would be published on 13 April 2018. That same day, the band announced that the album would be released on 15 June 2018.

In June 2018, the ensemble offered two free songs to people who purchase the album on or before 21 June 2018.

== Track listing ==
| No. | Title | Length |
|---|---|---|
| 1. | "Harley" | 3:22 |
| 2. | "Better Than Here" | 3:41 |
| 3. | "Comfort You" | 3:00 |
| 4. | "Scream" | 3:08 |
| 5. | "Naked in the Rain" | 3:19 |
| 6. | "I Hate Everything" | 3:23 |
| 7. | "Grow Up" | 3:13 |
| 8. | "BS" | 2:46 |
| 9. | "Xplode" | 3:41 |
| 10. | "See You on the Other Side" | 3:31 |
| 11. | "Safe Word" | 3:03 |
| Total length: | | 36:07 |
