= Cold Meat (film) =

2024 Netflix film

- Directed by: Sébastien Drouin
- Written by: Sébastien Drouin; James Kermack; Andrew Desmond
- Starring: Allen Leech; Nina Bergman; Yan Tual
- Music by: Cyril Morin
- Production companies: Featuristic Films; WTFilms
- Release date: February 26, 2024
- Running time: 90 minutes
- Countries: United Kingdom; Canada; France
- Language: English

Cold Meat is a 2024 thriller film directed by Sébastien Drouin. It was released exclusively on streaming Plateforms on February 26, 2024, such as Netflix Latin America, Amazon Prime, Paramount+ UK and Germany and TUBI, Shadows Spain.

== Plot ==
David Petersen (Allen Leech) is passing through the Colorado Rockies during a severe snowstorm. He stops off at a diner, where the waitress Ana (Nina Bergman) is accosted by her violent ex-husband Vincent (Yan Tual). David calmly and charmingly diffuses the situation, and Vincent leaves. Later, when David stops at a gas station, a local police officer tells him to get his wing-mirror fixed as soon as possible, as it is being held together with duct tape. When David leaves the gas station, Vincent follows him in his truck. A chase ensues, and David manages to elude Vincent by driving off-road into a secluded area. His car now stuck in the snow, David walks into the wilderness to find a way out.

It is revealed that David had chloroformed and kidnapped Ana earlier that night, and is keeping her in the trunk, bound with duct tape. She manages to escape, but the conditions are far too dangerous for her to walk, so she hides in the back of the car. On his way back to the car, David falls on the snow and breaks his leg. Once he is back in the car, Ana chloroforms him, and he wakes to find his hands have been bound to the steering wheel with duct tape.

Despite being held at knifepoint by Ana, David gloats about the crimes he has committed, and taunts Ana about her past. He reveals that he had used Ana's phone to text her daughter Ella, telling her that she is safe and not to worry about her. Ana knocks him unconscious, and David dreams of being lost in the forest, covered in blood and being stalked by a giant, elk-like beast. Each time he dreams, he wakes with a startle.

When David wakes hours later, Ana goes outside to pee, and he manages to lock the car doors whilst trying to free himself. Ana smashes the window of the car and almost strangles David to death with the seatbelt. After using the duct tape to patch the broken window, Ana scrolls the camera roll on David's phone, finding dozens of pictures and videos of herself and Ella. She also finds the driving licences of David's other victims. In a flashback, David recounts his first victim, a hitch-hiker named Cassie, whom he stabbed to death in a rage after picking her up. He tells Ana that Cassie was the daughter of a judge, and that he had to lie low for weeks after her body was found. From then on, he made sure his victims were from poorer or immigrant backgrounds, as the aftermath is much easier to deal with.

As the night goes on, the car becomes more and more submerged under the snow; the pair become increasingly more chafed and frostbitten, and David's leg has turned black. They try to sleep, but they are awoken by the sound of something prowling outside the car. An unseen creature jumps onto the roof of the car and starts to break the windshield before vanishing at the sound of the car horn. Ana tells David that they are on a reservation, and that the local natives tell a story of an ancient beast that roams the woods, hunting for the worst souls to capture and trap in the forest forever, and that the beast appears first in dreams.

The car's battery dies, and they are now completely buried under the snow. Ana cuddles up to David to share body heat. David admits that he was abused as a child, and Ana shares that she was also abused as a child, but unlike David she didn't repress her anger and bitterness, she instead channelled it into love and affection for her daughter. David suddenly breaks free of his restraints and attacks Ana, threatening to find and kill Ella, but the creature returns and drags David out of the car into the darkness. Ana locks herself in the trunk of the car and wills herself to stay awake.

Some time later, a man in a snow plough happens upon the car. He finds a trail of blood that leads to David's clothes and a pile of human viscera in the snow. When he opens the trunk, Ana wakes with a start.

== Production ==
Production of the film began in early 2023. It is Drouin's filmmaking debut. It was filmed in only thirteen days, in Prince George, British Columbia. It is Paris-based WTFilms' second collaboration with UK production company Featuristic Films, after working together on James Kermack's action thriller Knuckledust in 2020. The film was previewed at the FrightFest Film Festival in the United Kingdom on August 27, 2023.

== Reception ==
Cold Meat has a rating of 92% on Rotten Tomatoes and became a global hit. Particularly, it was praised for its tension between the two lead characters, acting, and the "uneasy element to everything (David) says that makes the film tick." At the Portuguese film festival Fantasporto in 2024, Sébastien Drouin won an award for best screenplay for his work on the film. On Netflix Latin America, Cold Meat entered the top 10 in 21 countries, propelling the film to the ninth place in the Netflix world global top 10.

On Paramount+ UK, it remained in the top 10 for 44 days. It was number one on the day of its release. On Paramount+ Germany-Austria, it reached the number 4 rank. On Shadows spain, it was the second most viewed movie in July 2026.

(
