= The Great Snake's Bride =

Japanese manga series

- First tankōbon volume cover, featuring Daija (left) and Miyo (right)

大蛇に嫁いだ娘 (Daija ni Totsuida Musume)
- Genre: Romantic fantasy; Supernatural
- Manga
- Written by: Fushiashikumo
- Published by: Enterbrain
- English publisher: NA: Seven Seas Entertainment
- Imprint: Beam Comics
- Magazine: Comic Marche
- Original run: February 12, 2021 – present
- Volumes: 8
- icon

The Great Snake's Bride (大蛇に嫁いだ娘, Daija ni Totsuida Musume) is a Japanese manga series written and illustrated by Fushiashikumo. It began serialization on the Comic Marche section of the Pixiv Comic website in February 2021.

== Synopsis ==
Miyo, a village girl with a scar on her forehead, is offered as a wedding offering to a giant snake. At first, she is frightened of the snake due to her initial belief that it would eat her, but she soon opens up to it as she is touched by its kindness.

== Characters ==
Daija (大蛇)
Voiced by: Takehito Koyasu (voice comic)
Daija is a giant white snake roughly 500 years old. He is revered as the god of the mountain by the local village. Despite his age, size, and immortality, he claims he is not a god as he cannot cannot control the weather nor crop yields. He absolutely despises monks and would have killed any that enter his mountain if not for the intervention of Miyo.
Prior to the events of the story, Daija reincarnated multiple times as different species of snakes. In his most previous incarnation, he was a giant black snake also revered as a god. However he was eventually betrayed by his village when he failed to stop a drought, causing them to send a priest to try to kill him. Many years past in seclusion, Daija slowly reopened his heart to humanity when he befriended a prostitute named Kinu. Kinu, who initially stayed with the same priest, was betrayed when he fell in love with her and raped her. Honoring her wish for suicide, Daija ate Kinu. Despite the old priest's efforts to curse Daija into vomiting her, he managed to digest Kinu days later. Daija tells the priest that Kinu chose death by a snake than to be with the priest. As Daija left the village, he was struck by lightning and reincarnated into the white snake of the current story.
Miyo (ミヨ)
Voiced by: Yumiri Hanamori (voice comic)
Miyo is a single woman in her early 30's, offered to Daija to be his wife (although the village thought it meant she was a human sacrifice). Years ago, her father was accused of murder and died escaping execution. The grief broke her mother's mind, leaving her and her brother orphaned. Because of her reputation of the being the daughter of a murderer and the scar on her head, she was considered disposable and thus chosen to be the sacrifice to Daija.

== Media ==
=== Manga ===
Written and illustrated by Fushiashikumo, The Great Snake's Bride began serialization on the Comic Marche section of the Pixiv Comic website on February 12, 2021. Enterbrain has collected the series' chapters into eight tankōbon volumes as of May 2026. The series is licensed in English by Seven Seas Entertainment.

No.	Original release date	Original ISBN	North American release date	North American ISBN
1	November 12, 2021	978-4-04-736844-6	July 18, 2023	978-1-68579-655-6
1. "To Become an Unusual Wife"; 2. "The First Night"; 3. "Change"; 4. "New Friends"; 5. "The Spousal Relationship"; 6. "Premonition"; 7. "A Winter of Missed Connections"; 8. "Overcoming the Cold Winter"
2	April 12, 2022	978-4-04-737004-3	October 31, 2023	979-8-88843-046-0
9. "The Couple's Child"; 10. "A Place For Me"; 11. "Plum Blossoms and Wanted Persons"; 12. "Old Wounds"; 13. "Snake"
3	October 12, 2022	978-4-04-737244-3	April 30, 2024	979-8-88843-391-1
14. "Kinu"; 15. "A Black Snake's Love"; 16. "Things Like That"; 17. "Let's Go Home"; 18. "Gently Tenderize"
4	May 12, 2023	978-4-04-737437-9	October 1, 2024	979-8-89160-058-4
19. "We're Okay Now"; 20. "The Beginning"; 21. "Giving Birth"; 22. "As a Parent"; 23. "Returning Home in the Winter"
5	January 12, 2024	978-4-04-737818-6	April 1, 2025	979-8-89160-917-4
24. "A Little Grand Adventure"; 25. "Friends"; 26. "My Favorite Things"; 27. "Man and Woman"; 28. "Ankel's Past"
6	August 9, 2024	978-4-04-738038-7	October 7, 2025	979-8-89373-915-2
29. "In the Rain"; 30. "The Beast"; 31. "Nine Years Later"; 32. "The Ocean Youth"; 33. "Love and Fear"
7	September 12, 2025	978-4-04-738634-1	July 28, 2026	979-8-89765-368-3
34. "The Land of the Sun – Part 1"; 35. "The Land of the Sun – Part 2"; 36. "The Land of the Sun – Part 3"; 37. "Promise"; 38. "Miyo's Hesitation"
8	May 12, 2026	978-4-04-500092-8	January 26, 2027	979-8-89863-246-5

=== Other ===
In commemoration of the release of the series' third volume, a voice comic adaptation was uploaded to the Kadokawa YouTube channel on the same day. The voice comic features the voices of Takehito Koyasu and Yumiri Hanamori. It also had an illustration collaboration with Hachi Inaba's The Tiger Won't Eat the Dragon Yet manga series.

In commemoration of the release of the series' fourth volume, the series had a collaboration with Haruomi Tomotsuka's Dara-san of Reiwa manga series.

== Reception ==
The series was nominated for the eighth Next Manga Awards in the web category in 2022. The series, along with Otsuji's My Stepmother and Stepsisters Aren't Wicked won the Men's Comic Prize at Comic Solmare's Electronic Manga Award in 2023. The series, alongside the manga adaptation of From Old Country Bumpkin to Master Swordsman and When Marriages Fracture won the 2023 Piccoma Award in the manga category.
