= Shiretto Sugee koto Itteru Gal =

Japanese manga series

- Shiretto Sugee koto Itteru Gal: Shiritsu Paranormal Kōkō no Nichijō
- First tankōbon volume cover

しれっとすげぇこと言ってるギャル。―私立パラの丸高校の日常― (Shiretto Sugee koto Itteru Gyaru: Shiritsu Paranormaru Kōkō no Nichijō)
- Genre: Comedy; Slice of life; Supernatural
- Created by: Plott, Inc
- Manga
- Written by: Taichi Matsuura
- Illustrated by: Otsuji
- Published by: Shueisha
- Imprint: Young Jump Comics
- Magazine: Tonari no Young Jump; Young Jump Pixiv
- Original run: November 15, 2023 – present
- Volumes: 5

Shiretto Sugee koto Itteru Gal: Shiritsu Paranormal Kōkō no Nichijō (しれっとすげぇこと言ってるギャル。―私立パラの丸高校の日常―, Shiretto Sugee koto Itteru Gyaru: Shiritsu Paranomaru Kōkō no Nichijō; lit. ''Gals Casually Say Incredible Things. -The Daily Life of Paranormal High School-'') is a Japanese manga series written by Taichi Matsuura and illustrated by Otsuji. The series is based on the Paranormal High School animated shorts YouTube channel created by Plott Inc. It began serialization on Shueisha's Tonari Young Jump website and the Pixiv Comic website under Shueisha's Young Jump Pixiv brand in November 2023.

== Plot ==
The series focuses on two gyaru in a world where everyone has superpowers – Mirai Misato, who has the ability to see the future, and Shouko "Heeko" Taira, who has the ability to travel between parallel universes. Although they act and talk like regular school girls, they sometimes end up casually talking about some incredible things thanks to their powers.

== Publication ==
Written by Taichi Matsuura and illustrated by Otsuji, Shiretto Sugee koto Itteru Gal: Shiritsu Paranormal Kōkō no Nichijō began serialization on Shueisha's Tonari no Young Jump website and the Pixiv Comic website under Shueisha's Young Jump Pixiv brand on November 15, 2023. The series is based on the Paranormal High School animated shorts YouTube channel created by Plott Inc. Its chapters have been compiled into five tankōbon volumes as of March 2026.

No.	Release date	ISBN
1	May 17, 2024	978-4-08-893225-5
2	October 18, 2024	978-4-08-893498-3
3	March 18, 2025	978-4-08-893603-1
4	September 19, 2025	978-4-08-893819-6
5	March 18, 2026	978-4-08-894106-6
6	November 18, 2026	978-4-08-894419-7

== Reception ==
The series was nominated for the tenth Next Manga Awards in 2024 in the web category and won the U-Next Award for that category. The series was selected by Apple Books Japan as the "Best Comedy Manga of 2024". The series won the Grand Prix in the "Have You Read This Manga? 2025" contest, organized by Number Nine Co., Ltd.

== See also ==
- My Stepmother and Stepsisters Aren't Wicked, another manga series by Otsuji
