= Dara-san of Reiwa =

Japanese manga series

- First tankōbon volume cover

令和のダラさん (Reiwa no Dara-san)
- Genre: Comedy horror
- Manga
- Written by: Haruomi Tomotsuka
- Published by: Media Factory
- English publisher: NA: Yen Press
- Imprint: MF Comics
- Magazine: ComicWalker; Nico Nico Seiga
- Original run: March 30, 2022 – present
- Volumes: 8
- Anime television series
- Directed by: Masato Suzuki
- Written by: Noboru Kimura; Yasunori Yamada
- Music by: Rei Ishizuka
- Studio: Asahi Production
- Licensed by: Crunchyroll
- Original network: AT-X (Uncensored); Tokyo MX, BS NTV, Kansai TV (Censored)
- Original run: July 2, 2026 – September 24, 2026
- Episodes: 13
- icon

Dara-san of Reiwa (Japanese: 令和のダラさん, Hepburn: Reiwa no Dara-san; lit. 'Dara-san of the Reiwa Era') is a Japanese manga series written and illustrated by Haruomi Tomotsuka. It was originally published as a webcomic on the author's Twitter account in October 2021, that later began serialization on Kadokawa's ComicWalker and Nico Nico Seiga manga websites in March 2022. An anime television series adaptation produced by Asahi Production premiered in July 2026.

== Plot ==
In a town in the mountains, there is the legend of a half human and half snake creature called the "Yamatagi Madara" that once terrorized the town. The town considers entry into the western mountains to be forbidden because a shrine dedicated to the Yamatagi Madara is there and it is feared that anyone who trespasses into this area will be cursed. Siblings, tomboy Hinata and feminine Kaoru, from the family that governs the western mountains, visit the area out of curiosity. There, they meet a demon with the upper body of a shrine maiden and the lower body of a snake. Like the legend, it has a terrifying appearance, but the siblings become friendly with it and begin calling it "Dara-san".

== Characters ==
Dara-san (ダラさん)
Voiced by: Fairouz Ai (voice comic), Mutsumi Tamura (anime)
Hinata Misogiya (三十木谷日向, Misogiya Hinata)
Voiced by: Aki Toyosaki (voice comic), Minami Tsuda (anime)
Kaoru Misogiya (三十木谷薫, Misogiya Kaoru)
Voiced by: Minako Kotobuki (voice comic), Momoka Terasawa (anime)
Amane Hasegawa (初瀬川周, Hasegawa Amane)
Voiced by: Aoi Koga (anime)
Naomichi Fudeki (筆木直道, Fudeki Naomichi)
Voiced by: Tomokazu Sugita (anime)
Miwa Ikago (五十子美和, Ikago Miwa)
Voiced by: Mai Aizawa (anime)
Older sister Shrine Maiden (姉巫女, Onemiko)
Voiced by: Saori Hayami (anime)
Orochi (おろち)
Voiced by: Hōchū Ōtsuka (anime)

== Media ==
=== Manga ===
Written and illustrated by Haruomi Tomotsuka, Dara-san of Reiwa was originally published as a webcomic on the author's Twitter account on October 9, 2021. The series later began serialization on Kadokawa's ComicWalker and Nico Nico Seiga manga websites on March 30, 2022, with its chapters collected by Media Factory into eight tankōbon volumes as of June 2026. The series is licensed in English by Yen Press.

No.	Original release date	Original ISBN	English release date	English ISBN
1	November 22, 2022	978-4-04-681851-5	June 24, 2025	979-8-8554-1118-8
Horrors 1–9; Bonus: "Even More Dara-san"
2	May 23, 2023	978-4-04-682414-1	November 25, 2025	979-8-8554-1120-1
Horrors 10–17; Bonus: "New Year's Dara-san"
3	November 21, 2023	978-4-04-683193-4	June 23, 2026	979-8-8554-1122-5
Horrors 18–25; Bonus Dara-san; Bonus: "Valentine's Dara-san"
4	June 21, 2024	978-4-04-683752-3	October 27, 2026	979-8-8554-2518-5
5	December 23, 2024	978-4-04-684407-1	—	—
6	June 23, 2025	978-4-04-684897-0	—	—
7	December 23, 2025	978-4-04-685540-4	—	—
8	June 23, 2026	978-4-04-660249-7	—	—

=== Anime ===
An anime television series adaptation was announced on December 11, 2025. It is produced by Asahi Production and directed by Masato Suzuki, with Noboru Kimura and Yasunori Yamada handling series composition, Koichi Kikuta designing the characters, Rei Ishizuka composing the music and Masaki Terasoma handling narration. The series premiered on July 2, 2026, on AT-X and other networks. The opening theme song is "Dara Dara♡Dancing""Dara Dara♡Dancing" (ダラダラ♡ダンシング, Dara Dara♡Danshingu), performed by the main cast members, while the ending theme song is "Hinata Bokko" (ひなたぼっこ), performed by Reirie. Crunchyroll is streaming the series.

==== Episodes ====
No.	Title	Directed by (Note: Production staff information is taken from the ending credits of each episode.)	Written by	Storyboarded by	Original release date
1	"Yamatagi-Madara of the Accursed Land"; Transliteration: "Imi-chi no Yamatagidara" (Japanese: 忌み地の屋跨斑)	Masato Suzuki	Noboru Kimura	Masato Suzuki	July 2, 2026
2	"Visiting the School for the First Time"; Transliteration: "Hajimete no Gakkō Hōmon" (Japanese: 初めての学校訪問)	Mao Sunaga	Katsuya Ishida	Masato Suzuki	July 9, 2026
3	"The Laws of Forbidden Ground"; Transliteration: "Kinsokuchi no Okite" (Japanese: 禁足地の掟)	Masahiko Watanabe	Tomoko Shinozuka	Bob Shirahata	July 16, 2026
4	"The Return of Yamatagi-Madara"; Transliteration: "Fukkatsu no Tanimadara" (Japanese: 復活の谷跨斑)	Akira Kato	Noboru Kimura	Ryōji Fujiwara	July 23, 2026
5	"Genealogy of Mountain Stewards"; Transliteration: "Yamamori no Keifu" (Japanese: 山守の系譜)	Michita Shiraishi	Katsuya Ishida	Satoshi Shimizu	July 30, 2026
6	"The Phantom Water God"; Transliteration: "Genei no Suijin-sama" (Japanese: 幻影の水神様)	Masahiko Watanabe	Tomoko Shinozuka	Bob Shirahata	August 6, 2026
7	"A Picture Show of Bygone Days"; Transliteration: "Arishi-hi no Kamishibai" (Japanese: 在りし日の紙芝居)	Mao Sunaga	Yasunori Yamada	Mao Sunaga	August 13, 2026
8	"A Serpent's Struggles"; Transliteration: "Funtō no Orochi" (Japanese: 奮闘のおろち)	Akira Kato	Katsuya Ishida	Ryōji Fujiwara	August 20, 2026
9	"Seven Wonders of the School"; Transliteration: "Gakkō no Nana Fushigi" (Japanese: 学校の七不思議)	Masahiko Watanabe	Tomoko Shinozuka	Bob Shirahata	August 27, 2026
10	"A Culture Festival for Two"; Transliteration: "Futari Kake no Bunkasai" (Japanese: 二人だけの文化祭)	Shunji Yoshida	Yasunori Yamada	Satoshi Shimizu	September 3, 2026
11	"The Taboo Test of Courage"; Transliteration: "Kindan no Kimodameshi" (Japanese: 禁断の肝試し)	Mao Sunaga	Katsuya Ishida	Mao Sunaga	September 10, 2026
12	"How To Spend New Years"; Transliteration: "Nenmatsu Nenshi no Sugoshikata" (Japanese: 年末年始の過ごし方)	Akira Kato	Tomoko Shinozuka	Ryōji Fujiwara	September 17, 2026
13	"Dara-san of the Reiwa Era"; Transliteration: "Reiwa no Dara-san" (Japanese: 令和のダラさん)	Masato Suzuki	Yasunori Yamada	Bob Shirahata	September 24, 2026

=== Other media ===
A voice comic was released on the Kadokawa Anime YouTube channel on February 24, 2023. It contains the performances of Fairouz Ai, Aki Toyosaki and Minako Kotobuki.

In commemoration of the release of the second volume, the series had a collaboration with Fushiashikumo's The Great Snake's Bride manga series.

== Reception ==
The series was nominated for the 8th Next Manga Awards in the web category in 2022 and was ranked 14th out of 50 nominees. The series was again nominated and also ranked 14th the following year. The series was also ranked 12th in the 2024 edition of Takarajimasha's Kono Manga ga Sugoi! guidebook for the best manga for male readers.

The manga is also recommended by manga artist Rei Hiroe.
