= The Tiger Won't Eat the Dragon Yet =

Japanese manga series

- First tankōbon volume cover

虎は龍をまだ喰べない。 (Tora wa Ryū o Mada Tabenai)
- Genre: Fantasy
- Manga
- Written by: Hachi Inaba
- Published by: Enterbrain
- English publisher: NA: Yen Press
- Imprint: Harta Comix
- Magazine: Harta
- Original run: April 15, 2021 – present
- Volumes: 6
- icon

The Tiger Won't Eat the Dragon Yet (Japanese: 虎は龍をまだ喰べない。, Hepburn: Tora wa Ryū o Mada Tabenai) is a Japanese manga series written and illustrated by Hachi Inaba. It began serialization in Enterbrain's seinen manga magazine Harta in April 2021.

== Synopsis ==
=== Setting ===
The Tiger Won't Eat The Dragon Yet takes place in a wilderness setting where animals can shift into humanoid semi-hybrids at will. Dragons, the only mythical creature that exists, are the dominant animals. They have supernatural powers, making them stand out to other animals and putting them at the top of the food chain.

Dragons have three different species. Each species can use a specific elemental powers. Chinese Dragons—referred to as water dragons—can manipulate water. However, only the water dragon that was "chosen by water" can use the said ability. Wyverns—referred to as fire dragons—can breathe Fire. But, their fire-breathing powers can only be used once, since using it would burn their throats, costing them their lives. However, Earth Dragons—whose form resembles a lily pad—do not have Earth powers in a traditional sense. Instead, they dig and bury their lower bodies underground, leaving only its upper body exposed. Basically disguising themselves as a forest. This method of hunting is similar to that as tending cattle, raising the animals within by providing them food that grows back immediately and only consuming the deceased animals. In rare cases, Earth Dragons consume every single animals that they have all at once.

Dragons destroy their surrounding environment, wage war against themselves, and treat other animals as filth. The water dragons and the fire dragons wage war against each other for centuries over a territory dispute, with no clear winner. They only stopped after "the land split into two".

Having enough of the dragons' tyranny, the animals started fighting back. Some animals started hunting them down, killing them for vengeance, while the birds start spreading fake rumours about dragons. They stated that dragon meat tastes the best, their blood can heal all kinds of wounds and sicknesses, and their heart grants immortality. Now no longer able to land on the ground due to the risk of getting killed, the water dragons started to cannibalize each other. Thus, The water dragons' population declined, almost going extinct. However, when animals eat dragon meat—especially the heart—they get poisoned by the time the full moon rises. The only way to stop the poison is to drink dragon blood; The problem is: they have to drink it once every full moon for the rest of their lives. Otherwise, they will die from the poison.

=== Plot ===
Hekidou, a water dragon gets caught by Hakurei, a white tiger intending to eat him. However, Hakurei realises Hekidou is too young to be eaten. Hekidou makes a deal with her; She must raise and feed him until he grows up just enough to be made into a meal. One night, an owl reveals to Hakurei that dragons live for a thousand years, far exceeding a tiger's lifespan. It also claims she is just wasting her time raising him and urges her to eat him while she still can. A few days later, an Orange Male tiger named Oga appears and wants to mate with Hakurei after getting defeated over a territory dispute. Hekidou convinces Hakurei not to take the deal, and Oga leaves; declaring he will return. Meanwhile, another Dragon makes its appearance.

A few days later, Oga returns for another attempt to mate with Hakurei, but Hekidou intervenes. Hekidou challenges Oga, but forfeits and leaves with Hakurei, angering the latter. Their argument was cut short when an enormous serpent appears out of nowhere and captures Hekidou. Hakurei chases them to a waterfall basin but slowly collapses, revealing she was bitten earlier, slowly dying from the poison. Hekidou demands to the serpent for a way to heal her; The serpent suggests his blood. Left with no other choice, Hekidou bites his hand and makes Hakurei drink the blood, healing her. The duo stays in the waterfall basin for the night. The next day, the duo leaves to head west. Shinsui—a female water dragon, arrives at the waterfall basin. She asks the serpent of the whereabouts of Hekidou. The serpent battles Shinsui, ending with the latter as the victor and the serpent ends up getting eaten.

Meanwhile, Hekidou suggests to Hakurei that they should find a way to extend her lifespan. Hekidou gets frustrated after struggling to find answers. While travelling, the duo encounters a group of monkeys. The elder monkey welcomes them and treats them a little too welcoming. When the duo is asleep, Hekidou wakes up tied up with ropes, realizing it was a trap the whole time. Two Steller's sea eagles—Kokuran and Misumi—swoop in just in time and rescues Hekidou. Kokuran explains they're taking him to Shinsui, but Hekidou refuses to go with them. Hekidou escapes, alerting the eagles. Meanwhile, Hakurei gets freed by Oga. Kokuran eventually recaptures Hekidou, but Hakurei arrives just in time and saves him. The eagles retreat, and Hekidou and Hakurei reunites. While exploring a cave, Hekidou and Hakurei encounters an enormous tortoise. Hekidou asks the tortoise for a way to extend one's lifespan. The tortoise leads them to a dragon skeleton, alongside a wolf skeleton. The tortoise tells a story about the deceased dragon once asking for a way to extend the wolf's lifespan, paralleling the duo's situation. The tortoise suggests the duo to go to "the highlands"—a land where creatures with long lifespans dwell.

Hekidou and Hakurei continue their journey towards the west, when Shinsui unexpectedly appears. Shinsui reveals herself as Hekidou's mother and manipulates him into following her. Hekidou coldly leaves Hakurei behind, declaring he no longer needs her. Devastated and enraged, Hakurei chases them down. Shinsui tries to get along with Hekidou, but he calls her out for trying to eat him when he was a baby. Shinsui denies the claim. All of a sudden, she urges Hekidou to mate with her, but Hekidou initially refuses. Shinsui threatens and pressures Hekidou, eventually resulting in him agreeing to mate with her, much to his unease. After mating, Hekidou angrily leaves. Hekidou and Hakurei reunites, having a bittersweet reunion at first, but eventually sharing an intimate time together. Meanwhile, a silhouette of Misumi is shown. It turns out while Kokuran and Shinsui were out hunting, Misumi requested Hekidou to help him fake his death to escape Kokuran and Shinsui. This results in Kokuran thinking Hekidou ate Misumi, shocking her.

Hekidou and Oga cross paths once again. The latter demands a fight, reminding Hekidou that the challenge the latter started was not over yet. Hekidou accepts, and battles Oga. The fight was cut short when a group of animals suddenly ambushes the group. Minerva—an elephant, attacks Hekidou, but spares him and his group after taking interest in their situation. Minerva decides to take Hekidou to "the elder"— a woolly mammoth that manages the forest Minerva and her group resides in. Arriving at the forest, Minerva and Hekidou talks to the elder, discussing about dragons. Out of the blue, the elder requests Minerva to take his place as the next elder, but she refuses. Suddenly, multiple roots start to hold Minerva, and tiny roots enter her ears. The elder reveals that an Earth Dragon is responsible for possessing both him and Minerva. The Earth Dragon kills the elder. It then creates chaos throughout the forest, killing the animals within it using roots. Two peregrine falcons—Tsurune and Shou—and one lion named Voltagul arrives and partially frees Minerva from the Earth Dragon's control. This causes the latter to unearth itself from the ground and flies off. However, multiple fire dragons appear and is approaching Minerva and the Earth Dragon's direction. The Fire Dragons proceed to burn both Minerva and the Earth Dragon down, killing them. One of the fire dragons named Kirie notices Hekidou, taking interest in him and flies off to tell "the great mother".

After arriving at her hive, Kirie reports to her mother about the discovery of a water dragon, surprising the great mother. Meanwhile, an egg is shown, revealing that Shinsui finally gave birth. Shinsui and Kokuran waits for the egg to hatch, but it never did. Shinsui end up breaking the egg, revealing the dead baby dragon, and proceeds to eat it. She gets to the conclusion that she needs Hekidou, indirectly saying she'll take him again. The Fire Dragons, led by Kirie and Liberame, abduct Hekidou. In the aftermath of the abduction, Hakurei pursues the Fire Dragons to rescue Hekidou. At the Fire Dragons' hive, Hekidou gets imprisoned alongside an amputated Water Dragon.

== Media ==
=== Manga ===
Written and illustrated by Hachi Inaba, The Tiger Won't Eat the Dragon Yet began serialization in Enterbrain's seinen manga magazine Harta on April 15, 2021. Its chapters have been compiled into six tankōbon volumes as of May 2026. The series is licensed in English by Yen Press.

=== Volumes ===
No.	Original release date	Original ISBN	North American release date	North American ISBN
1	October 12, 2022	978-4-04-737032-6	March 19, 2024	978-1-9753-7313-9
2	October 15, 2022	978-4-04-737039-5	August 20, 2024	978-1-9753-7893-6
3	September 15, 2023	978-4-04-737471-3	March 25, 2025	979-8-8554-0114-1
4	July 12, 2024	978-4-04-737946-6	September 23, 2025	979-8-8554-1564-3
5	May 15, 2025	978-4-04-738407-1	February 23, 2027	979-8-8554-3531-3
6	May 15, 2026	978-4-04-738569-6	—	—

=== Other ===
In commemoration of the release of the second volume, the series had a collaboration with Fushiashikumo's The Great Snake's Bride manga series.
