= My Stepmother and Stepsisters Aren't Wicked =

2020 manga series by Otsuji and its adaptation(s)

- First wideban volume cover

いびってこない義母と義姉 (Ibitte Konai Gibo to Gishi)
- Genre: Comedy; Historical; Slice of life
- Manga
- Written by: Otsuji
- Published by: Ichijinsha
- English publisher: NA: Seven Seas Entertainment
- Magazine: Comic Pool
- Original run: November 19, 2020 – present
- Volumes: 10
- Anime television series
- Directed by: Keisuke Inoue
- Produced by: Genta Ozaki; Hiroyuki Aoi; Takashi Jinguuji; Yuuko Matsui; Yuusuke Oonuki; Mika Hagiwara; Michiyo Takada; Tomomi Ebitani; Kento Yoshida; Miki Okazaki; Yumiko Fujii; Yoshifumi Kobari
- Written by: Nanami Hoshino
- Music by: Rina Tayama
- Studio: Newon
- Licensed by: Remow; SEA: Tropics Entertainment
- Original network: tvk, TVS, CTC, MBS, Tokyo MX, BS Asahi
- Original run: July 8, 2026 – September 26, 2026
- Episodes: 12
- icon

My Stepmother and Stepsisters Aren't Wicked (Japanese: いびってこない義母と義姉, Hepburn: Ibitte Konai Gibo to Gishi) is a Japanese manga series written and illustrated by Otsuji. It began serialization on Ichijinsha's Comic Pool section on the Pixiv Comic website in November 2020. An anime television series adaptation produced by Newon aired from July to September 2026.

== Premise ==
Following the death of her mother, Miya Nakamura learned she was her father's illegitimate child and later adopted into his family. Contrary to the intimidating dispositions her new stepmother and stepsisters have, they adore her and help her adjust. Due to her anthropophobia, Miya tends to misunderstand their intentions.

== Characters ==
Miya Nakamura (中村 美冶, Nakamura Miya)
Voiced by: Hina Suzuki
Teru Kounokura (鴻蔵 てる, Kōnokura Teru)
Voiced by: Kujira
Arisa Kounokura (鴻蔵 ありさ, Kōnokura Arisa)
Voiced by: Yuka Nukui
Marika Kounokura (鴻蔵 まりか, Kōnokura Marika)
Voiced by: Yū Serizawa
Gungnir (グングニル, Gunguniru)
Voiced by: Anna Mugiho
Yaeko Kōzō (鴻蔵弥栄子, Kōzō Yaeko)
Voiced by: Miyari Nemoto
Nago (名護)
Voiced by: Yumi Uchiyama
Mitsuya (三ツ矢)
Voiced by: M.A.O
Ueki (植木)
Voiced by: Hiroki Tōchi
Yasu Nakamura (中村ヤス, Nakamura Yasu)
Voiced by: Eiko Yamada
Riru Kazan (花山リル, Kazan Riru)
Voiced by: Yō Taichi
Koyuki Inari (稲荷小雪, Inari Koyuki)
Voiced by: Momoka Terasawa
Sadame Mikuriya (御厨定, Mikuriya Sadame)
Voiced by: Hiroki Nanami
Hachi Ura (浦ハチ, Ura Hachi)
Voiced by: Nao Tōyama
Takiko Mizuse (水瀬瀧子, Mizuse Takiko)
Voiced by: Riho Sugiyama
Homare Takanashi (小鳥遊ほまれ, Takanashi Homare)
Voiced by: Ai Kakuma
Chiyo Mitsunaka (満仲千代, Mitsunaka Chiyo)
Voiced by: Minami Tsuda

== Media ==
=== Manga ===
Written and illustrated by Otsuji, My Stepmother and Stepsisters Aren't Wicked began serialization on Ichijinsha's Comic Pool section on the Pixiv Comic website on November 19, 2020. Its chapters have been collected into ten wideban volumes as of August 2026. The series is licensed in English by Seven Seas Entertainment.

No.	Original release date	Original ISBN	North American release date	North American ISBN
1	May 25, 2021	978-4-7580-2245-3	May 2, 2023	978-1-68579-700-3
Chapters 1–6; Side Story 1 (番外編 その1, Bangai-hen Sono 1); Side Story 2 (番外編 その2, Bangai-hen Sono 2); Bonus: "Miya and Gun-chan's Mansion Exploration" (美冶とグンちゃんのお屋敷探検隊, Miya to Gun-chan no Oyashiki Tankentai); Bonus: "Marika on that Day" (あの日のまりか, Ano Hi no Marika)
2	December 17, 2021	978-4-7580-2332-0	August 22, 2023	978-1-68579-917-5
Chapters 7–12; Bonus: "The Head Maid Nago-san's Work Journal" (メイド長・名護さんの業務記録, Meido-chō Nago-san no Gyōmu Kiroku); Bonus: "Culture Guide" (ワクワク読書体験ツアー, Waku Waku Dokusho Taiken Tsuā); Bonus: "Three Maids in a Tub" (ビバノン, Bibanon)
3	August 19, 2022	978-4-7580-2442-6	January 23, 2024	978-1-68579-964-9
Chapters 13–18; Bonus: "Miya and Gun-chan's Mansion Detective Agency" (美冶とグンちゃんのお屋敷探偵団, Miya to Gun-chan no Oyashiki Tanteidan); Bonus: "Newcomer Maid: Mitsuya-san's Diary of Struggle" (新人メイド・三ッ矢さんの奮闘記録, Shinjin Meido Mitsuya-san no Funtō Kiroku)
4	February 25, 2023	978-4-7580-2496-9	June 18, 2024	979-8-88843-648-6
Chapters 19–24; Bonus: "A Friend's Friends" (友達の友達たち, Tomodachi no Tomodachi-tachi); Bonus: "Throw the Beans!" (まめまけっ!, Mamemaki!); Bonus: "Marika and Arisa That Day" (その日のまりかとありさ, Sono Hi no Marika to Arisa)
5	October 25, 2023	978-4-7580-2602-4	December 3, 2024	979-8-89160-514-5
Chapters 25–30; Bonus: "Gun-chan's Crazy Vaccination Event" (グンちゃんの予防接種ドタバタ劇, Gun-chan no Yobō Sesshu Dotabata Geki); Bonus: "The Secret to Being a Good Mother" (いい母の秘訣, Ii Haha no Hiketsu); Bonus: "Studying High" (勉強ズ ハイ, Benkyōzu Hai)
6	May 27, 2024	978-4-7580-2708-3	June 17, 2025	979-8-89373-315-0
Chapters 31–36; Bonus: "Ardent Guardians Are Early to Rise" (親衛隊の朝は早い, Shin'eitai no Asa wa Hayai); Bonus: "Arisa's Health Struggles" (ありさの健康奮闘記, Arisa no Kenkō Funtōki); Bonus: "Mommy That Day" (あの日のマミー, Ano Hi no Mamii)
7	December 25, 2024	978-4-7580-2826-4	December 30, 2025	979-8-89561-700-7
Chapters 37–42; Bonus: "Riru-sama's Love and Sadness" (愛と悲しみのリル様, Ai to Kanashimi no Riru-sama); Bonus: "Kounokura Ghost Story" (鴻蔵怪談物語, Kounokura Kaidan Monogatari); Bonus: "Dear Mother" (拝啓、お母さん, Haikei, Okāsan)
8	July 25, 2025	978-4-7580-2948-3	June 23, 2026	979-8-89765-352-2
Chapters 43–48; Bonus: "Matching" (おそろい, Osoroi); Bonus: "Hachi's Favorite Food" (ハチの好物, Hachi no Ii Mono); Bonus: "The Arts Festival: Another Challenger" (芸術祭 〜もう一人の挑戦者〜, Geijutsu-sai: Mōhitori no Chōsensha)
9	February 26, 2026	978-4-7580-8962-3	January 5, 2027	979-8-89863-215-1
Chapters 49–54; Bonus: Nijūgonichi, Gozen (25日、朝); Bonus: Kumori Kyō no Tenshoku (久守 今日子の天職); Bonus: Oshōgatsu (お正月)
10	August 25, 2026	978-4-8251-0088-6	—	—
Chapters 55–60; Bonus: Anyaku Arisa (暗躍ありさ); Bonus: Mamii no Naito Rūtin (マミーのナイトルーティーン)

=== Anime ===
An anime television series adaptation was announced on July 22, 2025. It was produced by Newon and directed by Keisuke Inoue, with Nanami Hoshino handling series composition, Mutsumi Sasaki designing the characters and serving as chief animation director, and Rina Tayama composing the music. The series aired from July 8 to September 26, 2026, on tvk and other networks. (Note: Episode 12 first aired on MBS on September 26, 2026.) The opening theme song is "Amayadori no Shōkei" (雨宿りの憧憬; "Longing to Take Shelter from the Rain"), performed by Lia, while the ending theme song is "Claire" (クレール, Kurēru), performed by AVAM.

Remow licensed the series for simultaneous airing worldwide on It's Anime's YouTube channel, as well as Amazon Prime Video and Rakuten Viki in North America, Latin America, and Australia. Tropics Entertainment licensed the series in Southeast Asia for streaming on Tropics Anime Asia's YouTube channel.

==== Episodes ====
No.	Title	Directed by (Note: Production staff information is taken from the ending credits of each episode.)	Written by	Storyboarded by	Original release date
1	"My Stepmother and Stepsisters Aren't Wicked"; Transliteration: "Ibitte Konai Gibo to Gishi" (Japanese: いびってこない義母と義姉)	Keisuke Inoue	Nanami Hoshino	Keisuke Inoue	July 8, 2026
After losing her mother to illness, Miya Nakamura is taken in by the wealthy Kounokura family upon discovering she is the illegitimate daughter of the family head. Though initially terrified of the oppressive mansion, terrifying stepmother, Teru, and enthusiastic half-sisters, Arisa and Marika, Miya receives a surprisingly warm welcome. Blaming Miya's father for abandoning her, the family discards his possessions into the cellar to give Miya his grand study as a bedroom. The sisters offer to teach Miya to read, and Teru personally repairs a handkerchief that is Miya's only keepsake of her mother. That night, sensing Miya's anxiety, her sisters comfort her and ask to be called by their names, while Teru suggests being called "Mommy" to preserve the memory of Miya's birth mother. The next day, Miya's maternal grandmother, Yasu, arrives to take her home, believing commoners do not belong with nobility. Supported by her new sisters, Miya chooses to stay. Teru suspects Yasu actually intends to indenture Miya to a merchant family, which Yasu denies. Yasu ultimately leaves Miya with the option to return home if she ever wishes.
2	"The Kounokura Family's Guard"; Transliteration: "Kounokura no Goei" (Japanese: 鴻蔵の護衛)	Keisuke Inoue	Nanami Hoshino	Goichi Iwahata	July 15, 2026
Teru takes Miya shopping, where her sisters eagerly compete to buy her gifts. Miya chooses a damaged trinket box decorated with irises, her late mother's favorite flower. Teru repairs the damage herself with kintsugi. Miya is also given Gungnir, a fluffy dog meant to act as her personal bodyguard who has never barked due to past trauma. While walking Gungnir, Miya observes her sisters' kindness toward servants and garden work, wondering why they treat her warmly yet constantly fight with each other. She also appreciates Teru's generosity toward the staff, which contrasts sharply with her previous employer's indifference. Later, the family celebrates mamemaki by throwing beans at Teru dressed as an oni to dispel bad luck. Accustomed to hard manual labor, Miya worries about accidentally hurting Teru with her throw. The ceremony concludes joyfully, with Miya unaware that head maid Nago secretly intercepted her bean mid-air—preventing a throw powerful enough to cause Teru serious injury.
3	"Daughters of Distinguished Families"; Transliteration: "Meika no Musume-tachi" (Japanese: 名家の娘たち)	Keisuke Gōda	Nanami Hoshino	Goichi Iwahata	July 22, 2026
Miya struggles with her studies, prompting Marika to share her own past academic failures and temporary delinquency, which ended when Teru assured Marika of her pride in her. Consequently, Marika nicknamed Teru "Mama", vowing to hold off on calling her "Mother" until she becomes a worthy heir. Later, when gardener Ueki falls while working on the fountain, Miya nearly injures herself trying to help before her sisters step in. Accidental chaos ensues, leaving everyone soaked, so the exasperated Teru sends Ueki to the doctor and the girls to find dry clothing. Marika later tests Miya's reading and writing skills. Reassured by Arisa that failure is merely a chance to learn, Miya achieves a perfect score, prompting Teru to host a celebratory party. At the gathering, Miya meets her new, much younger cousin, Yaeko. Though Yaeko initially aims subtle insults at Miya regarding her status in the family, Miya remains oblivious. After Arisa comforts Yaeko by affirming her place in the family, Yaeko apologizes and declares Miya her rival for Arisa's affection. Meanwhile, Teru secretly coordinates an upcoming event with a woman named Inari.
4	"Miya Returning a Favor"; Transliteration: "Miya no Ongaeshi" (Japanese: 美冶の恩返し)	Masahiro Hosoda	Nanami Hoshino	Masahiro Hosoda	July 29, 2026
One month after moving in, Miya tries to polish her sisters' shoes as a thank you for everything, but they misunderstand and hire a cobbler to make Miya her own shoes. Later, when Miya offers to help them try on dresses, her sisters insist she try them on too. She chooses a blue dress. This delights her sisters, who secretly pre-selected the dress knowing she would love it. While researching a gift to buy them, Miya declines an invitation to walk in the garden. This worries her sisters, as it is her first time saying "no". However, their anxiety turns to relief after dinner when Miya presents an apple pie she baked. Sharing a bath afterward, her sisters reassure Miya that as family, she never needs to repay them. The next morning, her sisters announce it is time for Miya to leave the house now that she is properly prepared. Fearing she is being forced to work and support the family, Miya asks Teru for a farewell hug. Teru embraces all three sisters, confused why Miya thinks she is leaving forever when all they meant is that Teru has enrolled Miya for school.
5	"Miya's First Friend"; Transliteration: "Hajimete no Tomodachi" (Japanese: 初めての友達)	Misaki Nishimoto	Nanami Hoshino	Goichi Iwahata	August 5, 2026
On her first day at Eihou Girls Academy, Miya is immediately deemed to be unsuitable by Riru Kazan, her popular classmate. Fearing impending bullying, Miya attempts to hide this encounter from her sisters, though they quickly sense her distress. Elsewhere, Riru's mother, an old friend of Teru, is disappointed the two girls have not bonded. Believing Miya is both unattractive and weak, Riru decides to test her resolve by appointing Miya vice representative for an upcoming school trip to Eihou Mountain. During the rigorous hike, Riru continues to judge Miya harshly. When Miya suddenly requests a break halfway up the mountain, Riru initially views it as undeniable proof of weakness. However, Riru soon realizes Miya only halted the group because she was walking at the back and noticed another girl struggling to keep pace. Ashamed of her own lack of observation, Riru's opinion of Miya changes, as she recognizes Miya's quiet empathy as the unassuming beauty of a lone wildflower. Upon reaching the summit, Riru apologizes to Miya and asks to be friends. Meanwhile, Teru is proud that Marika and Arisa let Miya navigate this entirely on her own.
6	"The Inari Family's Daughter"; Transliteration: "Inari-ke no go Sokujo" (Japanese: 稲荷家のご息女)	Keisuke Gōda	Keisuke Inoue	Mirai Minato	August 12, 2026
Chairman Inari's granddaughter, Koyuki, finally attends school after missing the start of the year due to crippling social anxiety. Because her family became wealthy by gathering sensitive information, Koyuki struggles with casual conversations to avoid leaking family secrets, leaving her friendless. However, Miya, who shares a similarly nervous personality, sits next to Koyuki for lunch. Miya's endless patience allows Koyuki to speak slowly without feeling pressured. Later, Riru joins them for a group project, as she has known Koyuki all her life but always failed to become friends. Riru's usual intensity initially worsens Koyuki's nerves, so Riru is stunned when Koyuki speaks normally after Miya calmly waits. Realizing her aggressive approach was the problem, Riru learns to adopt Miya's patient mindset around Koyuki. Days later, Riru and Koyuki visit Miya's home to prepare for exams. Studying stalls when Riru clashes with her childhood rival, Marika, until Teru sends Nago to tutor them. Thanks to the intense session, Miya, Riru and Koyuki all achieve perfect scores.
7	"The Kounokura Treasure"; Transliteration: "Kounokura no Zaihō" (Japanese: 鴻蔵の財宝)	Asahi Yoshimura & Masahito Otani	Keisuke Inoue	Noumin6	August 19, 2026
Invited to join the Young Leaves Women's Association led by the "Four Goddesses", Inari, Mrs. Mikuriya, Kazan and Teru, a young lady accidentally breaches etiquette by wearing a koi-patterned kimono when it was Mikuriya's turn to wear koi. Though Kazan protests that Mikuriya changing ruins the party's color scheme, Teru arrives in a koi pattern as well. Everybody then poses together for a photo. Meanwhile, Yaeko brings cake for Miya to celebrate her perfect exam score, and is amazed Miya does not fear Teru's terrifying reputation. Miya discovers a letter from Nago outlining a mansion treasure hunt. Guided by riddles and unwitting hints from her sisters, Nago rearranging dinner plates, and advice on garden design from Ueki, Miya folds the pages into origami. This directs her to the tower room, where the true "treasure" is revealed: a breathtaking sunset view of the gardens. Teru thanks Nago and Ueki for staging the hunt to entertain Miya during a rainstorm. Updating the mansion diary, Nago reflects on how Miya's presence has softened family tensions, while struggling to suppress her idolization of Teru. Amused, Teru admits she already knows about Nago's feelings, as Gungnir previously retrieved one of her love letters.
8	"The Dog Lady"; Transliteration: "Inu no Onee-san" (Japanese: 犬のお姉さん)	Masahiro Hosoda	Nanami Hoshino	Masahiro Hosoda	August 26, 2026
It is Parent Observation Day at Eihou Girls' Academy, where Teru, Kazan, and Mrs. Mikuriya are there to judge the teachers. Teru is ultimately impressed with the job the teachers have done regarding her daughters' education. In her classroom, Miya is about to read her essay aloud. Despite being worried after hearing some of the mothers spread rumors about her background, she feels supported by Teru's presence. As a result, everyone is moved after hearing her essay. The next day, Koyuki runs for class representative, though she is nervous about it. Thanks to Miya's support, Koyuki proceeds to win the campaign. However, Miya becomes worried about Koyuki due to the task overwhelming her. While Miya is walking with Gungnir, she meets a girl, whom she gives Miya some words of wisdom that helps her assist Koyuki the following day. Soon after, Sadame Mikuriya, the student council president, is introduced. To Miya's surprise, it is seemingly the same girl she previously met.
9	"A Disciplined and Traditional Student Council"; Transliteration: "Kiritsu to Dentō no Seitokai" (Japanese: 規律と伝統の生徒会)	Keisuke Gōda	Nanami Hoshino	Goichi Iwahata	September 2, 2026
Arisa and Marika tells Miya about Sadame and how she became the embodiment of discipline. Meanwhile in the student council, the vice president, Hachi Ura, reports the announcement of the sports festival along with the survey from Parent Observation Day regarding Miya's background. The next day, Miya meets the student council. Marika defends Miya when Hachi berates her. Later while waking home by herself, Miya meets the head of the athletic committee, Hazuki Nakayama, who is trying to jump rope. As a result, Miya decides to help Hazuki train. Riru is ultimately impressed at how Hazuki has improved her skills. The girls then play a game of dodgeball, with Miya's team opposing Riru's team. After the match, Riru and the rest of the girls are surprisingly impressed at Miya with her throwing technique. Due to being busy, Riru will not participate in the sports festival, so the girls are counting on Miya for their victory. This makes Miya nervous until Teru tells her to embrace her heart and experience it to the fullest. The following day, the sports festival is about to begin.
10	"Battle of the Maidens"; Transliteration: "Otome-tachi no Sen" (Japanese: 乙女たちの戦)	Yūtarō Yamamoto	Nanami Hoshino	Noumin6	September 9, 2026
The sports festival begins with Miya on the yellow team opposing her own stepsisters, who are on the blue team. The blue team takes an early lead. During the Scavenger Hunt event, Miya is given points for the yellow team after uses her family as the answer to her hint. After lunchtime, a sudden rainstorm hits the sports festival. Refusing to let it be canceled, Miya and the rest of the girls dry the entire ground, with the student council helping out. Riru soon returns to help the yellow team. The sports festival ends with the blue team as the winners and they receive a rare and expensive pudding as their prize. However, Teru and the rest of the mothers have all made their own pudding for the yellow team as their reward. In a flashback, Arisa was shocked that she gained weight, so she decided to diet and exercise in hopes to stay fit. However, Teru told Arisa not to worry about her weight, as they were on a cheat day for the sports festival. Later that night, Teru has something planned for her daughters.
11	"Memories of Summer"; Transliteration: "Natsu no Omoide" (Japanese: 夏の思い出)	Keisuke Inoue	Nanami Hoshino	Miyana Okita	September 16, 2026
The Kounokuras head to the beach for their summer vacation. After arriving there, Miya unexpectedly meets Riru. Two members of the student council, Homare Takanashi and Takiko Mizuse, also arrive at the beach, though Riru holds a grudge against Homare for some reason. The girls then go to the villa where Miya, Arisa, Marika, and Riru are having fun. However, Homare starts crying when she sees Arisa and Marika are fighting. This irritates Riru as she tells Miya the story about she first met Homare and how Homare kept breaking up the fight between herself and another girl. Riru then told Homare that she wanted nothing to do with her anymore as she stormed off. Riru later gets into an argument with Marika. When Homare tries to intervene, Miya stops her as they both watch Riru and Marika bond. As night falls, Homare and Takiko leave the villa. Meanwhile, Teru brings some fireworks to celebrate with the girls.
12	"Dear Mother"; Transliteration: "Haikei, Okāsan" (Japanese: 拝啓、お母さん)	Masahiro Hosoda	Nanami Hoshino	Miyana Okita	September 26, 2026
Nago tells the girls a scary story until Teru shows up to tell them it is bedtime, though the girls and Nago become scared afterwards. On the last day of summer, Yaeko comes over for a visit after getting a tan when she went swimming at the beach with her family. The girls then go outside where Teru prepares some shaved ice for everyone to enjoy while listening to the sound of the cicadas. Once school starts, Miya does not attend due to her having a cold. Worried about her, Marika and Arisa remember the day they first met Miya. While recovering, Miya dreams about her mother taking care of her. Marika, Arisa, and Teru tend to her when she wakes up. She then receives get-well gifts from her friends and Yaeko. While they are alone, Miya cries tears of joy when Teru tells her to cherish her memories with her mother. Miya eventually recovers completely and returns to school with her stepsisters and friends.

== Reception ==
The series was nominated for the seventh Next Manga Awards in the web category in 2021 and was ranked seventh out of 50 nominees. The series was ranked seventeenth in the 2022 edition of Takarajimasha's Kono Manga ga Sugoi! guidebook for the best manga for female readers. The series, along with Fushiashikumo's The Great Snake's Bride, won the Men's Comic Prize at NTT Solmare's Digital Comic Awards 2023.

== See also ==
- Shiretto Sugee koto Itteru Gal, another manga series by Otsuji
