= When Marriages Fracture =

Japanese manga series

- First tankōbon volume cover

極限夫婦 (Kyokugen Fūfu)
- Genre: Romantic drama; Suspense
- Manga
- Written by: Akira Kiduki
- Illustrated by: Nanki Satō
- Published by: Futabasha
- English publisher: NA: MangaPlaza
- Imprint: Action Comics
- Magazine: Monthly Action; (December 25, 2021 – February 24, 2024); Manga Action; (April 2, 2024 – present)
- Original run: December 25, 2021 – present
- Volumes: 10 (print); 18 (digital)
- Television drama
- Original network: Kansai TV, DMM TV
- Original run: January 18, 2024 – March 21, 2024
- Episodes: 10

When Marriages Fracture (極限夫婦, Kyokugen Fūfu; lit. 'Extreme Married Couple') is a Japanese manga series written by Akira Kiduki and illustrated by Nanki Satō. It began serialization in Futabasha's seinen manga magazine Monthly Action in December 2021. After the disbandment of the magazine in February 2024, it was later transferred to the Manga Action magazine in April that same year. A television drama adaptation aired from January to March 2024.

== Plot ==
The series is centered around the lives of dysfunctional married couples; featuring cheating husbands and women seeking revenge on said husbands.

== Media ==
=== Manga ===
Written by Akira Kiduki and illustrated by Nanki Satō, When Marriages Fracture began serialization in Futabasha's seinen manga magazine Monthly Action on December 25, 2021. After the final issue of Monthly Action was published on February 24, 2024, the series was transferred to the Manga Action magazine on April 2, 2024. The series' chapters have been compiled into eighteen digital volumes as of June 2026, and ten tankōbon volumes as of July 2026.

The manga is licensed digitally in English by NTT Solmare via their MangaPlaza website and app.

No.	Release date	ISBN
1	April 12, 2023	978-4-575-85831-0
2	April 27, 2023	978-4-575-85834-1
3	June 12, 2023	978-4-575-85860-0
4	November 9, 2023	978-4-575-85907-2
5	May 10, 2024	978-4-575-85964-5
6	November 28, 2024	978-4-575-86028-3
7	April 24, 2025	978-4-575-86083-2
8	October 23, 2025	978-4-575-86148-8
9	February 26, 2026	978-4-575-86191-4
10	July 24, 2026	978-4-575-86250-8
11	December 24, 2026	978-4-575-86312-3

=== Drama ===
In December 2023, a television drama adaptation was announced. The drama consisted of 10 episodes with three different narratives were featured. It starred Sayuri Matsumura, Terunosuke Takezai, Rei Okamoto, Renn Kiriyama, Kie Kitano, and Yūta Hiraoka as the lead couples. It aired on Kansai TV and DMM TV from January 18, to March 21, 2024.

== Reception ==
By July 2026, the series had over 3.3 million copies in circulation.

The series, alongside From Old Country Bumpkin to Master Swordsman and The Great Snake's Bride won the 2023 Piccoma Award in the manga category.
