= From Old Country Bumpkin to Master Swordsman =

Japanese light novel series

- From Old Country Bumpkin to Master Swordsman: My Hotshot Disciples Are All Grown Up Now, and They Won't Leave Me Alone
- First light novel volume cover, featuring (from left to right) Surena Lysandra, Allucia Citrus, and Beryl Gardinant

片田舎のおっさん、剣聖になる ～ただの田舎の剣術師範だったのに、大成した弟子たちが俺を放ってくれない件～ (Katainaka no Ossan, Kensei ni Naru: Tada no Inaka no Kenjutsu Shihan Datta noni, Taisei Shita Deshitachi ga Ore o Hōttekurenai Ken)
- Genre: Fantasy
- Novel series
- Written by: Shigeru Sagazaki
- Published by: Shōsetsuka ni Narō
- Original run: November 17, 2020 – present
- Light novel
- Written by: Shigeru Sagazaki
- Illustrated by: Tetsuhiro Nabeshima
- Published by: Square Enix
- English publisher: NA: J-Novel Club
- Imprint: SQEX Novel
- Original run: April 7, 2021 – present
- Volumes: 11
- Manga
- Written by: Shigeru Sagazaki
- Illustrated by: Kazuki Satō
- Published by: Akita Shoten
- English publisher: NA: Yen Press
- Imprint: Young Champion Comics
- Magazine: Dokodemo Young Champion
- Original run: August 24, 2021 – present
- Volumes: 9
- Manga

From Old Country Bumpkin to Master Swordsman: The Mage Knight's Origin
- Written by: Itsuki Watanabe
- Illustrated by: Megumu Soramichi
- Published by: Square Enix
- English publisher: NA: Square Enix
- Imprint: Gangan Comics UP!
- Magazine: Manga Up!
- Original run: November 29, 2024 – present
- Volumes: 3
- Manga

From Old Country Bumpkin to Master Swordsman: The Twin Dragonblade's Journey to the Top
- Written by: Zenji Yotsuya
- Illustrated by: Sasami Hazama
- Published by: Square Enix
- English publisher: NA: Square Enix
- Imprint: Young Gangan Comics
- Magazine: Young Gangan
- Original run: February 7, 2025 – present
- Volumes: 3
- Anime television series
- Directed by: Akio Kazumi
- Written by: Kunihiko Okada
- Music by: Yasuharu Takanashi
- Studio: Passione; Hayabusa Film
- Licensed by: Amazon Prime Video
- Original network: ANN (TV Asahi), AT-X, BS Asahi
- Original run: April 5, 2025 – present
- Episodes: 24

From Old Country Bumpkin to Master Swordsman: My Hotshot Disciples Are All Grown Up Now and They Won't Leave Me Alone (Japanese: 片田舎のおっさん、剣聖になる ～ただの田舎の剣術師範だったのに、大成した弟子たちが俺を放ってくれない件～, Hepburn: Katainaka no Ossan, Kensei ni Naru: Tada no Inaka no Kenjutsu Shihan Datta noni, Taisei Shita Deshitachi ga Ore o Hōttekurenai Ken) is a Japanese light novel series written by Shigeru Sagazaki and illustrated by Tetsuhiro Nabeshima. It initially began serialization on the user-generated novel publishing website Shōsetsuka ni Narō in November 2020, before later acquired and published by Square Enix under their SQEX Novel imprint in April 2021. A manga adaptation illustrated by Kazuki Satō began serialization in Akita Shoten's seinen manga web magazine Dokodemo Young Champion in August 2021. An anime television series adaptation produced by Passione and Hayabusa Film aired from April to June 2025. A second season aired from July to September 2026. A third season has been announced.

== Plot ==
Beryl Gardinant is a swordsman in his mid-forties who teaches at a small dojo in a countryside village. Though viewing himself as thoroughly unimpressive, one day, he is visited by one of his former pupils and invited to become an instructor for the knights of the Liberion Order in the capital. Reluctantly accepting the offer, this leads to Beryl reuniting with many other former disciples and discovering that they have all become highly accomplished individuals using the "backwater" skills he taught them.

== Characters ==
Beryl Gardinant (ベリル・ガーデナント, Beriru Gādenanto)
Voiced by: Hiroaki Hirata (Japanese); Cory Yee^{Ep. 1 credits} (English)
A middle aged sword trainer who operates a rural dojo. Despite his insistence that there is nothing special about him, he has ended up training some of the most powerful and influential fighters and adventurers in the entire kingdom. He is able read his opponents next move and counter them, making him almost unmatched by most opponents.
Allucia Citrus (アリューシア・シトラス, Aryūshia Shitorasu)
Voiced by: Nao Tōyama (Japanese); Ashley Bell^{Ep. 1 credits} (English)
The leader of the knights of the Liberion Order, she was one of Beryl's students and recommends him to be a special trainer for the Liberion Order so that the kingdom can recognize his skills. She also has a crush on Beryl and views Surena as her rival. She still uses the same sword given to her by Beryl upon her graduation from his school. Her swordsmanship relies on her incredible speed.
Surena Lysandra (スレナ・リサンデラ, Surena Risandera)
Voiced by: Hitomi Ueda (Japanese); Chelsea Krause^{Ep. 1 credits} (English)
A black-ranked adventurer and one of Beryl's students. She was orphaned as a child and rescued by Beryl, who taught her how to use a sword. She also has a crush on Beryl and views Allucia as her rival. She dual wields special swords made from an immortal dragon she slew by outlasting its regenerative power with overwhelming strength and relentless attacks.
Curuni Crueciel (クルニ・クルーシエル, Kuruni Kurūshieru)
Voiced by: Yuuki Hirose (Japanese); Kana Shimanuki^{Ep. 1 credits} (English)
A knight of the Liberion Order who trained under Beryl. She is very happy-go-lucky. Although she had originally used a standard issued short sword, she switched to a Zweihänder that takes advantage of her surprising strength.
Henbritz Drought (ヘンブリッツ・ドラウト, Henburittsu Dorauto)
Voiced by: Kaito Ishikawa (Japanese); Nathan McLaron^{Ep. 1 credits} (English)
Allucia's second-in-command in the Liberion Order. He is initially skeptical of Beryl's skill, but after being defeated in a duel by him, becomes one of his most enthusiastic students.
Moldea Gardenant (モルデア・ガーデナント, Morudea Gādenanto)
Voiced by: Naoya Uchida (Japanese); Hopper Stone^{Ep. 1 credits} (English)
Beryl's father who is also a skilled swordsman.
Ficelle Harbeller (フィッセル・ハーベラー, Fisseru Hāberā)
Voiced by: Hinaki Yano (Japanese); Julz Roche^{Ep. 2 credits} (English)
A mage of the Magic Corps and one of Beryl's students. Due to her training under Beryl, Ficelle specializes in sword magic where she uses a sword to cast her spells.
Lucy Diamond (ルーシー・ダイアモンド, Rūshī Daiamondo)
Voiced by: Chiwa Saitō (Japanese); Nicole Gose^{Ep. 2 credits} (English)
The leader of the Magic Corps who takes an interest in Beryl after hearing Ficelle's stories of him. She is a highly skilled mage, and reportedly uses magic to make herself look younger than she actually is, making her true age unknown.
Mewi Freya (ミュイ・フレイア, Myui Fureia)
Voiced by: Arisa Nakada (Japanese); Wissall Homayun^{Ep. 4 credits} (English)
A young girl who is Beryl's adoptive daughter. She was previously a pickpocket who was told that she could use the money she stole to resurrect her sister.
Spur (シュプール, Shupūru)
Voiced by: Ryōta Ōsaka (Japanese); Michael Woodley^{Ep. 5 credits} (English)
A knight who serves as the bodyguard of Reveos Sarleon, a bishop of the Church of Sphene. He has extraordinary swordsmanship.
Rose Marbleheart (ロゼ・マーブルハート, Roze Māburuhāto)
Voiced by: Ai Kayano (Japanese); Shannon O'Brien^{Ep. 9 credits} (English)
The lieutenant of the Holy Order of the Church of Sphene. She is another one of Beryl's former students.
Gatoga Lazorne (ガトガ・ラズオーン, Gatoga Razuōn)
Voiced by: Hidenobu Kiuchi (Japanese); Varian David^{Ep. 10 credits} (Note: Ovais Malik filled in for David as Gatoga in certain episodes of season 2.^{Ep. 22, 23, and 24 credits}) (English)
The Knight Commander of the Holy Order of the Church of Sphene who is also Rose's stepbrother.
Warren Flumvelk (ウォーレン・フルームヴェルク, Ōren Furūmuveruku)
Voiced by: Kensho Ono (Japanese); Tyler Menjivar (Note: Credited as Tyler Menji.^{Ep. 19 credits}) (English)
A nobleman who is a former student of Beryl.
Shueste Flumvelk (シュステ・フルームヴェルク, Shusute Furūmuveruku)
Voiced by: Sumire Uesaka (Japanese); Chelsea Krause^{Ep. 19 credits} (English)
A noblewoman who is Warren's younger sister.
Hanoy Cressa (ハノイ・クレッサ, Hanoi Kuressa)
Voiced by: Takashi Kondō (Japanese); Sean Burgos^{Ep. 20 credits} (English)
The leader of the Verdapis Mercenary Corps who has a preference for clients who offer worthwhile rewards. He wields a great sword.
Prim (プリム, Purimu)
Voiced by: Mami Uchida (Japanese); Julz Roche^{Ep. 20 credits} (English)
A member of the Verdapis Mercenary Corps who acts as a support mage. She is capable of controlling nature.
Kuriu Rybark (クリウ・ライバーク, Kuriu Raibāku)
Voiced by: Hiromu Mineta (Japanese); Clifton Yada^{Ep. 23 credits} (English)
A member of the Verdapis Mercenary Corps who is a dual-wielding swordsman. He joined the group because it offered freedom over honor.
Morris Pasyushka (モーリス・パシューシカ, Mōrisu Pashūshika)
Voiced by: Hiroshi Yanaka (Japanese); Dexter Wite^{Ep. 22 credits} (English)
The revered pope of Sphenism, the state religion of the nation of Sphenedyardvania.
White Maiden (ホワイト・メイデン, Howaito Meiden)
A mysterious masked mercenary who works freelance and is unable to speak. She displays a calm demeanor on the battlefield.

== Media ==
=== Light novel ===
Written by Shigeru Sagazaki, From Old Country Bumpkin to Master Swordsman: My Hotshot Disciples Are All Grown Up Now and They Won't Leave Me Alone began serialization on the user-generated novel publishing website Shōsetsuka ni Narō on November 17, 2020. It was later acquired and published by Square Enix as a light novel with illustrations by Tetsuhiro Nabeshima under their SQEX Novel imprint on April 7, 2021. Eleven volumes have been released as of August 2026. The light novel is licensed in English by J-Novel Club.

==== Volumes ====
No.	Original release date	Original ISBN	North American release date	North American ISBN
1	April 7, 2021	978-4-7575-7190-7	November 22, 2023	978-1-7183-2470-1
1. "Chapter 1: An Old Country Bumpkin Goes to the Capital"; 2. "Allucia Citrus"; 3. Interlude; 4. "Chapter 2: An Old Country Bumpkin Meets a Wizard"; 5. "Chapter 3: An Old Country Bumpkin Meets a Dragon"; 6. "Surena Lysandra"; 7. "Epilogue: An Old Country Bumpkin Enjoys a Meal"
2	September 7, 2021	978-4-7575-7462-5	February 28, 2024	978-1-7183-2472-5
1. "Chapter 1: An Old Country Bumpkin Looks for a Sword"; 2. "Chapter 2: An Old Country Bumpkin Meets a Thief"; 3. "Mewi Freya"; 4. Interlude; 5. "Chapter 3: An Old Country Bumpkin Cuts Apart the Dark Night"; 6. "Epilogue: An Old Country Bumpkin's Treat"
3	February 7, 2022	978-4-7575-7732-9	May 15, 2024	978-1-7183-2474-9
1. "Chapter 1: An Old Country Bumpkin Buys Clothes"; 2. "Chapter 2: An Old Country Bumpkin Meets Royalty"; 3. Interlude; 4. "Chapter 3: An Old Country Bumpkin Strikes Down the Hand of Evil"; 5. "Epilogue: An Old Country Bumpkin Gets Another Drink"
4	July 7, 2022	978-4-7575-8022-0	November 4, 2024	978-1-7183-2476-3
1. "Chapter 1: An Old Country Bumpkin Takes Up Teaching"; 2. "Chapter 2: An Old Country Bumpkin Nurtures Friendships"; 3. Interlude; 4. "Chapter 3: An Old Country Bumpkin Dances with Shadows"; 5. "Epilogue: An Old Country Bumpkin Thinks of the Future"
5	December 7, 2022	978-4-7575-8300-9	January 15, 2025	978-1-7183-2478-7
1. "Chapter 1: An Old Country Bumpkin Visits Home"; 2. "Chapter 2: An Old Country Bumpkin Has His Fill"; 3. Interlude; 4. "Chapter 3: An Old Country Bumpkin Overcomes a Wall"; 5. "Epilogue: An Old Country Bumpkin Senses Defeat"
6	June 7, 2023	978-4-7575-8605-5	April 2, 2025	978-1-7183-2480-0
1. "Chapter 1: An Old Country Bumpkin Goes on an Expedition"; 2. "Chapter 2: An Old Country Bumpkin Meets a Noble"; 3. Interlude; 4. "Chapter 3: An Old Country Bumpkin Gets Worked Up"; 5. "Epilogue: An Old Country Bumpkin Enjoys His Fill"
7	January 6, 2024	978-4-7575-8997-1	July 2, 2025	978-1-7183-2482-4
1. "Chapter 1: An Old Country Bumpkin Feels the Onset of Winter"; 2. "Chapter 2: An Old Country Bumpkin Travels to the Holy Capital"; 3. Interlude; 4. "Chapter 3: An Old Country Bumpkin Becomes a Savior"; 5. "Epilogue: An Old Country Bumpkin Makes a Promise"
8	August 6, 2024	978-4-7575-9345-9	October 10, 2025	978-1-7183-2484-8
1. "Chapter 1: An Old Country Bumpkin Gifts a Sword"; 2. "Chapter 2: An Old Country Bumpkin Watches the Entrance Exam"; 3. Interlude; 4. "Chapter 3: An Old Country Bumpkin Ventures North"; 5. "Epilogue: An Old Country Bumpkin Seeks Answers"
9	March 27, 2025	978-4-7575-9776-1	January 16, 2026	978-1-7183-2486-2
1. "Chapter 1: An Old Country Bumpkin Learns of Danger"; 2. "Chapter 2: An Old Country Bumpkin Heads West"; 3. Interlude; 4. "Chapter 3: An Old Country Bumpkin's Conquest"; 5. "Epilogue: An Old Country Bumpkin Contemplates the Future"
10	December 25, 2025	978-4-301-00244-4	August 10, 2026	978-1-7183-2488-6
1. "Chapter 1: An Old Country Bumpkin Has Apprehensions"; 2. "Chapter 2: An Old Country Bumpkin's Eyes Awaken"; 3. Interlude; 4. "Chapter 3: An Old Country Bumpkin Runs About"; 5. "Epilogue: An Old Country Bumpkin Drinks the Night Away"
11	August 6, 2026	978-4-301-00628-2	—	—

=== Manga ===
A manga adaptation illustrated by Kazuki Satō began serialization in Akita Shoten's seinen manga web magazine Dokodemo Young Champion on August 24, 2021. The manga's chapters have been collected into nine tankōbon volumes as of June 2026.

During their panel at Sakura-Con 2024, Yen Press announced that they licensed the manga adaptation.

A spin-off manga series written by Itsuki Watanabe and illustrated by Megumu Soramichi, titled From Old Country Bumpkin to Master Swordsman: The Mage Knight's Origin (片田舎のおっさん、剣聖になる外伝 はじまりの魔法剣士, Katainaka no Ossan, Kensei ni Naru Gaiden: Hajimari no Mahō Kenshi), began serialization on Square Enix's Manga Up! manga service on November 29, 2024. It focuses on the character Ficelle Harbeller. The spin-off's chapters have been collected into three tankōbon volumes as of August 2026. The series is published in English on Square Enix's Manga Up! Global app.

Another spin-off manga series, titled From Old Country Bumpkin to Master Swordsman: The Twin Dragonblade's Journey to the Top (片田舎のおっさん、剣聖になる外伝 竜双剣の軌跡, Katainaka no Ossan, Kensei ni Naru Gaiden: Ryūsōken no Kiseki), began serialization in Square Enix's Young Gangan magazine on February 7, 2025. The series is written by Zenji Yotsuya and illustrated by Sasami Hazama and is centered around the character Surena Lysandra. The spin-off's chapters have been collected into three tankōbon volumes as of June 2026. The series is also published in English on Square Enix's Manga Up! Global app.

==== Volumes ====
===== From Old Country Bumpkin to Master Swordsman =====
No.	Original release date	Original ISBN	English release date	English ISBN
1	February 18, 2022	978-4-253-30691-1	September 17, 2024	979-8-8554-0189-9
1. "The Old Man Has Babes on Both Sides!"; 2. "The Old Man Is Going to Be Homeless!?"; 3. "The Old Man Duels with the Vice Commander!"; 4. "The Old Man Has a Drink with His Disciples!"; 5. "The Old Man Is Surprised by Magic!"
2	June 20, 2022	978-4-253-30692-8	January 21, 2025	979-8-8554-0191-2
6. "The Old Man Faces Off Against Magic!"; 7. "The Old Man Asked for a Favor!"; 8. "The Old Man Has a Serious Battle Against Surena!"; 9. "The Old Man Goes on a Dungeon Attack!"; 10. "The Old Man's in Trouble!?"
3	March 20, 2023	978-4-253-30693-5	May 27, 2025	979-8-8554-0193-6
11. "The Old Man Begins the Counteroffensive!"; 12. "The Old Man Heads to the Blacksmith!"; 13. "The Old Man Picks Up a Pendant!"; 14. "The Old Man Reunites with a Girl!"; 15. "The Old Man's Surrounded!"
4	August 24, 2023	978-4-253-30694-2	October 28, 2025	979-8-8554-0195-0
16. "The Old Man Is Covered in Blood!"; 17. "The Old Man Drinks the Night Away!"; 18. "The Old Man Becomes the Subject of Rumors!"; 19. "The Old Man Leads the Way!"
5	January 26, 2024	978-4-253-30695-9	April 28, 2026	979-8-8554-1505-6
20. "The Old Man Heads to the Church!"; 21. "The Old Man Is Cornered!"; 22. "The Old Man Crosses Swords!"; 23. "The Old Man Runs!"; 24. "The Old Man Catches Up!"
6	August 6, 2024	978-4-253-30696-6	September 22, 2026	979-8-8554-2249-8
26. "The Old Man Leads the Way!"; 27. "The Old Man Is Encouraging!"; 28. "The Old Man Draws His Blade!"; 29. "The Old Man Settles the Fight!"; Extra: "A Dojo Destroyer Encounters That Old Man!"
7	March 27, 2025	978-4-253-30697-3	April 27, 2027	979-8-8554-2589-5
8	December 25, 2025	978-4-253-00953-9	—	—
9	June 26, 2026	978-4-253-01788-6	—	—

===== The Mage Knight's Origin =====
No.	Japanese release date	Japanese ISBN
1	March 27, 2025	978-4-7575-9775-4
2	December 25, 2025	978-4-301-00246-8
3	August 6, 2026	978-4-301-00693-0

===== The Twin Dragonblade's Journey to the Top =====
No.	Japanese release date	Japanese ISBN
1	March 27, 2025	978-4-7575-9776-1
2	December 25, 2025	978-4-301-00245-1
3	June 26, 2026	978-4-301-00600-8

=== Anime ===
An anime television series adaptation was announced on August 1, 2024. It was produced by Passione and Hayabusa Film and directed by Akio Kazumi, with series composition by Kunihiko Okada, characters designed by Satsuki Hayasaka, who also served as chief animation director, and music composed by Yasuharu Takanashi. The series aired from April 5 to June 22, 2025, on the IMAnimation programming block on TV Asahi and its affiliates. The opening theme song is "Heroes", performed by Takanori Nishikawa, while the ending theme song is "Alright!!!", performed by Flow. Amazon Prime Video is streaming the series worldwide.

Following the final episode of the first season, a second season was announced, which aired from July 8 to September 23, 2026, on the IMAnimation W programming block on the same channel and its affiliates. The opening theme song is "Kurenai no Ha" (クレナイノハ; 'Crimson Leaf'), performed by Unicorn, while the ending theme song is "Mikansei" (未完成; 'Unfinished'), performed by Blue Encount.

Following the final episode of the second season, a third season was announced.

==== Episodes ====
===== Season 1 (2025) =====
No. overall	No. in season	Title	Directed by	Written by	Storyboarded by	Original release date
1	1	"The Old Country Bumpkin Goes to the Capital"; Transliteration: "Katainaka no Ossan, Shuto ni Iku" (Japanese: 片田舎のおっさん、首都に行く)	Daiki Shikimoto	Kunihiko Okada	Akio Kazumi & Shuhei Morita	April 5, 2025
Beryl Gardinant works as a swordfighting trainer in a remote country dojo. Though he had dreams of becoming an adventurer, he settled for teaching many students. One day, one of his old students, Liberion Order commander Allucia Citrus, arrives at his home. Allucia explains that she recommended Beryl to be a special instructor for the Liberion Order, which was approved by the king. Unable to refuse, Beryl travels to the capital city of Baltrain with Allucia, where he introduces himself to the soldiers and reunites with a second former student named Curuni Crueciel. Upon returning home, Beryl finds out his father has arranged for another former student, Randrid Pattlerock, to take over the dojo. Returning to Baltrain, Beryl encounters yet another former student, Surena Lysandra, who has become Allucia's rival. During his first training session, Beryl is challenged to a duel by the Liberion Order's vice commander, Henbritz Drought. Beryl uses his experience to predict Henblitz's moves and defeat him, winning his and the Order's respect. Back at the village, Beryl's father and Randrid hope Beryl can make a name for himself in the capital.
2	2	"The Old Country Bumpkin is Astounded by a Wizard"; Transliteration: "Katainaka no Ossan, Majutsu-shi ni Kyōgaku Suru" (Japanese: 片田舎のおっさん、魔術師に驚愕する)	Masaru Kawashima	Kunihiko Okada	Akio Kazumi	April 12, 2025
One week after becoming a special instructor, Beryl has gotten used to his new position, and Curuni offers to show him around Baltrain. Meanwhile, Allucia recalls her training with Beryl, and that she did not realize how skilled he was until she and her fellow students easily defeated another dojo in a competition. After graduating and working her way up to be the commander of the Liberion Order by defeating all of her opponents, Allucia came to conclusion that Beryl does not realize how strong he truly is. She then decided it would be her mission to push Beryl and the entire kingdom to recognize his skill. As Beryl and Curuni tour the city, they run into another of his former students, Ficelle Harbeller, who is now a wizard of the Magic Corps. He initially believes Ficelle gave up swordfighting until she uses special sword magic to apprehend a criminal. The next morning, Beryl encounters the commander of the Magic Corps, Lucy Diamond, who challenges him to a duel in order to test this skills.
3	3	"The Old Country Bumpkin Weathers a Fierce Attack"; Transliteration: "Katainaka no Ossan, Mōkō o Shinogu" (Japanese: 片田舎のおっさん、 猛攻を凌ぐ)	Yūta Kida	Kunihiko Okada	Shinji Itadaki	April 19, 2025
While Beryl is unable to land a hit on Lucy, he manages to avoid being hit by her spells, which is enough to impress her. Later, Surena approaches Beryl with a request from the Adventurer's Guild to help train young adventurers. Beryl recalls his ill-fated attempt at becoming an adventurer in his youth and does not feel qualified, but both Surena and Lucy vouch for his skills. The Guildmaster eventually agrees to have Beryl duel Surena to prove himself. Surena is enthusiastic at the opportunity to properly face off against Beryl, recalling how he rescued her when she was a child. After learning how to use swords from Beryl, she became an adventurer so she could continue to use the skills he taught her as well as prevent other children from being orphaned like her. During the duel, Beryl acknowledges Surena has improved drastically, but spots a weakness in her non-dominant left hand and is able to exploit it to defeat her. Beryl reluctantly becomes a trainer for the Adventurer's Guild and accompanies a trainee party with Surena. While they easily clear a cave of monsters, the party is ambushed by high level monster called Zeno Grable.
4	4	"The Old Country Bumpkin Takes Flight With a Monster"; Transliteration: "Katainaka no Ossan, Monsutā to Sora wo Tobu" (Japanese: 片田舎のおっさん、 モンスターと空を飛ぶ)	Ippei Ichii	Satoshi Ozaki	Shinji Itadaki	April 26, 2025
Beryl manages to hold his own against Zeno Grable, stabbing the beast the eye and distracting it long enough for Surena to land the killing blow. Beryl is celebrated as a hero by the Adventurer's Guild for this feat, but he turns down their offer to become an adventurer. The next day, Curuni and Allucia take Beryl to a local blacksmith to replace the sword he broke battling Zeno Grable. He is pleasantly surprised to see the blacksmith is another of his former students, Balder Gasp. Beryl and Balder both notice Curuni's short sword is suffering more wear than it should be, and deduce that her fighting style favors larger and heavier swords, so she decides to switch to a Zweihänder. Surena then brings one of Zeno Grable's claws and commissions Balder to make a new sword out of it for Beryl. After training Curuni how to use the Zweihänder and having dinner, Beryl heads home and catches a pickpocket named Mewi attempting to steal his wallet. Mewi uses magic to escape, but accidentally leaves her necklace behind, which Beryl picks up.
5	5	"The Old Country Bumpkin Gets Enraged by the Bad Guys"; Transliteration: "Katainaka no Ossan, Akutō ni Ikidōru" (Japanese: 片田舎のおっさん、 悪党に憤る)	Hiroki Moritomo	Kunihiko Okada	Hiroaki Yoshikawa	May 3, 2025
Beryl decides to turn the necklace in to the Order as lost property but encounters Mewi searching for it. He helps her recover the necklace and brings her to Allucia, where she admits that she has turned to crime due to a wizard promising to revive her deceased sister in return for five million dalc. Allucia brings Lucy over to talk to Mewi, and Lucy offers to take her into the Magic Institute, warning her that resurrection magic does not exist. Mewi insists she witnessed her sister being briefly resurrected, and reveals the wizard who made the offer to her is named Twilight, the leader of the criminal gang Dark Hand of Twilight. Lucy tells Mewi to lead her to Twilight, and requests Beryl accompany them. Beryl neutralizes Twilight's henchmen while Lucy defeats the wizard and forces him to admit he scammed Mewi. Afterwards, the Order takes custody of Twilight and his men while Lucy takes in Mewi. However, Lucy warns the Order that Twilight is likely being controlled by somebody else. Sure enough, Twilight is assassinated by members of the church, who plan to use the corpses he collected for them in a ritual.
6	6	"The Old Country Bumpkin Faces the Dead"; Transliteration: "Katainaka no Ossan, Shisha to Taijisuru" (Japanese: 片田舎のおっさん、 死者と対峙する)	Ippei Ichii	Satoshi Ozaki	Hiroaki Yoshikawa	May 10, 2025
Beryl receives his new sword but is quickly summoned by Lucy, who warns him that a bishop of the Church of Sphene, Reveos Sarleon, is likely Twilight's secret backer and plans to use the corpses to recreate the Sphene's Miracle, which supposedly can resurrect the dead. Sarleon has already been called to testify before the Order, but Lucy asks Beryl to be prepared to capture him if he tries to flee the country. Beryl agrees to the plan since there is a chance they can recover the body of Mewi's sister. He has a brief reunion with Mewi, who is still confused why he and Lucy are treating her so nicely. Beryl assures her that they just want to give her a better future. That night, Beryl catches Sarleon attempting to flee. Ficelle and Curuni arrive to hold off the guards so Beryl can confront Sarleon himself. Once Sarleon resurrects the corpses as zombies, Beryl is forced to stop them and Spur, Sarleon's bodyguard. Sarleon is then apprehended. The next day, Lucy rewards Beryl by gifting him a house, while Mewi agrees to have him be assigned her legal guardian and live with him.
7	7	"The Old Country Bumpkin Learns the Challenges of Parenting"; Transliteration: "Katainaka no Ossan, Oya no Kurō o Shiru" (Japanese: 片田舎のおっさん、 親の苦労を知る)	Hiroki Moritomo	Kunihiko Okada	Masatoshi Chioka, Masae Nakayama & Akio Kazumi	May 17, 2025
Beryl struggles to figure out how to take care of Mewi as her adoptive father. After touring the city together, he accompanies her to the Magic Institute where they meet one of the teachers, Kinera Fine. Kinera advises that since Mewi can produce flames, she should focus on studying offensive magic. She then takes them on a tour of the school, including the dormitory. On the way home, Beryl wonders whether it would better for Mewi to live in the dormitory or with him and if she can adjust to school life. He consults with his students and acquaintances, all of whom advise him to allow Mewi to live in the dormitory, but he is still left conflicted. After helping Beryl remove rats from their house, Mewi ultimately makes the decision to commute to the Magic Institute from home rather than live in the dormitory. The decision catches Beryl by surprise, but he comes to accept it after seeing Mewi's determination.
8	8	"The Old Country Bumpkin Gets Struck by a Lightning-Fast Sword"; Transliteration: "Katainaka no Ossan, Shinsoku no Ken o Kurau" (Japanese: 片田舎のおっさん、 神速の剣を食らう)	Yūta Kida	Kunihiko Okada	Shinji Itadaki	May 24, 2025
Allucia informs Beryl that a foreign delegation will be visiting Baltrain soon, and advises that he buy new clothes since he will be personally meeting the dignitaries. Once Beryl reluctantly agrees, Allucia takes him out shopping. Curuni and Henbritz secretly follow the pair, with Curuni believing Allucia has a romantic interest in Beryl. At the end of the day, Beryl buys a new set of clothes and takes his leave. Henbritz then directly confronts Allucia about her feelings for Beryl, but she gives a vague answer. The next day, Allucia challenges Beryl to a duel. During the duel, Beryl realizes Allucia has improved significantly since they last sparred, and knows he cannot win against her in a fair fight. Instead, he defeats Allucia by grabbing her cloak and throwing her to the ground. Allucia accepts the defeat as a valuable lesson. After Beryl leaves, Henbritz approaches Allucia again, who admits she planned to confess her feelings to Beryl if she won. Later that night, Mewi points out to Beryl Allucia's obvious interest in him, to which he refuses to acknowledge due to their large age difference.
9	9	"The Old Country Bumpkin Goes on His First Hunt in Ages"; Transliteration: "Katainaka no Ossan, Hisashiburi ni Kari ni Iku" (Japanese: 片田舎のおっさん、 ひさしぶりに狩りに行く)	Masaru Kawashima	Kunihiko Okada	Takashi Kamei	May 31, 2025
Seeing that Mewi does not have a school bag, Beryl resolve to buy one before her first day at the Magic Institute, but balks at the high price. Surena then approaches him for help on a tough job from the Guild to capture a rare horse, which he complies. Once they arrive in the forest, they have difficulty catching the horse. However, after both Beryl and the horse are caught in a landslide, he manages to win its respect when he rescues it. Beryl uses the reward money to buy Mewi's new school bag, and finds out that Mewi took on a part-time job in order to buy him a new ceramic mug to replace his chipped wooden one. The next day, Beryl sees Mewi off to her first day at the Magic Institute. At the Order training hall, Allucia informs Beryl that the Commander and Vice Commander of the Order of Sphene have arrived, and she plans to meet them with Henbritz. Still suspicious due to Sarleon's actions, Beryl decides to meet them as well and is surprised to see the Vice Commander is another former student of his, Rose Marbleheart.
10	10	"The Old Country Bumpkin Guards a Princess"; Transliteration: "Katainaka no Ossan, Ōjo no Goei ni Tsuku" (Japanese: 片田舎のおっさん、 王女の護衛に着く)	Masaru Kawashima	Kunihiko Okada	Takashi Kamei	June 7, 2025
Commander Gatoga informs Allucia that since Rose is new to her position and has never been to Baltrain, he has brought her ahead of the delegation so she can familiarize herself with the city. Beryl ends up showing Rose around the city for a bit, and she teases the idea of living with him if she were to move to Baltrain. When he returns home, Mewi complains that she has trouble reading some of her textbooks, and Beryl promises to help her study. On the day the delegation from Sphenedyardvania arrives, Allucia assigns herself, Beryl, and Henbrtiz to guard Liberis' Princess Salacia, who will be traveling together with Sphenedyardvania's Prince Glenn, who will be guarded by Gatoga and Rose. As Glenn and Salacia tour the city, the delegation is suddenly attacked by a group of assassins. Beryl and the knights manage to fight them off, though Gatoga apparently recognizes one of the assassins. The attack is thwarted, but the captured assassins kill themselves with suicide pills, denying any opportunity to interrogate them.
11	11	"The Old Country Bumpkin Throws Himself into a Deadly Fight"; Transliteration: "Katainaka no Ossan, Shitō ni Miwotōjiru" (Japanese: 片田舎のおっさん、 死闘に身を投じる)	Yūta Kida	Kunihiko Okada	Kotarō Kakita & Akio Kazumi	June 14, 2025
Everybody splits up for the day once Glenn and Salacia are escorted back to safety. Rose asks Allucia about the details of the next location of the tour, and they end up trading stories about Beryl before they help a lost child find his mother. Meanwhile, Beryl returns home to find Lucy waiting for him. She warns him that Sphenedyardvania is currently in the midst of a power struggle between the Papists and Royalists, and the assassins were likely sent by the Church of Sphene to kill Glenn so he can be replaced by the Second Prince Flax, who is loyal to the Church. The next day, Glenn decides to continue the tour as planned. Curuni is assigned to the guard detail while Gatoga admits to Beryl that he recognized one of the assassins as Hinnis, the former vice commander before Rose. During the tour, the assassins attack again. When there is a break in the fighting, Beryl requests Allucia take Glenn and Salacia to safety while he holds off the assassins. He then goes to confront Rose, who admits that she is in league with the assassins.
12	12	"The Old Country Bumpkin Gets Praised as a Master Swordsman"; Transliteration: "Katainaka no Ossan, Kensei to Yobareru" (Japanese: 片田舎のおっさん、 剣聖と呼ばれる)	Ippei Ichii	Kunihiko Okada	Shinji Itadaki	June 22, 2025 (Note: This episode aired at 12:00 a.m. JST, 30 minutes after the regular air time on TV Asahi.)
Beryl faces down Rose in a duel and manages to strike her down. However, he decides to spare her life upon learning she was forced by the Pope to aid the assassins by holding the orphans in Sphenedyardvania hostage. Gatoga arrives and heals Rose, with Beryl confirming the accusation that Sarleon was dabbling in forbidden magic. Hearing this, Gatoga decides to cover up Rose's involvement with the assassins, and Rose promises to redeem herself. Afterwards, news of Beryl saving Glenn and Salacia spreads around the kingdom, and he is invited to attend a royal banquet. At the banquet, King Gladio thanks Beryl for protecting Salacia and officially recognizes him as a master swordsman, much to Allucia's delight, and Beryl returns home to Mewi, still content with living an ordinary life. Meanwhile, spies tail Rose and Gatoga as they return to Sphenedyardvania, while Randrid and Beryl's father hear of Beryl's exploits and hope this is the first step to him becoming a proper swordmaster.

===== Season 2 (2026) =====
No. overall	No. in season	Title	Directed by (Note: Production staff information is taken from the ending credits of each episode.)	Written by	Storyboarded by	Original release date
13	1	"The Old Country Bumpkin Takes on a New Position"; Transliteration: "Katainaka no Ossan, Aratana Shokuba ni Iku" (Japanese: 片田舎のおっさん、新たな職場に行く)	Masaru Kawashima & Takahide Ejiri	Kunihiko Okada	Shinji Itadaki	July 8, 2026
Beryl continues his duties training the knights of the Liberion Order when Lucy arrives and asks him to assist Ficelle in teaching the new sword magic course at the Magic Institute. Reluctant to accept right away, Beryl decides to visit the Magic Institute first. Sitting in on Ficelle's class, Beryl quickly observes her struggling to convey her lessons to her students. As such, he proceeds to step in and help her. Curious about Beryl's strength, the students then begin to wonder if he is actually stronger than Ficelle, so the two of them agree to have a sparring match. Beryl is initially at a disadvantage since Ficelle's mastery of both magic and sword fighting does not leave many openings at any range. Instead, he resorts to catching her off guard by throwing his sword at her, distracting her long enough for him to subdue her. The students are inspired by Beryl's show of skill, and he decides to start teaching them. That night, Ficelle reports the day's events to Lucy, who explains she arranged for Beryl to teach at the Magic Institute as a way to challenge him to keep growing beyond his current limits.
14	2	"The Old Country Bumpkin Watches Them Grow"; Transliteration: "Katainaka no Ossan, Seichō o Mimamoru" (Japanese: 片田舎のおっさん、成長を見守る)	Yūta Kida	Satoshi Ozaki	Masae Nakayama & Akio Kazumi	July 15, 2026
Beryl continues assisting Ficelle with her class, though she is still struggling in terms of her teaching methods. Mewi also has a difficult time interacting with her classmates due to her shyness, but one of them, Cindy, tries to get her to open up and invites her to her birthday party. Meanwhile, Beryl encounters Vice Principal Brown, who opposes the creation of the sword magic class. He then meets Kinera again, who invites him out to lunch and teaches him about defensive magic. Afterward, Beryl pays a visit to the new Bishop of the Church of Sphene, who confides in him that the in wake of recent events, the Holy Order is being reorganized and Rose was force to step down from her position as Vice Commander. The Bishop also hints that Holy Order is preparing for something. Beryl, Ficelle, and Mewi later attend Cindy's birthday party, where Mewi begins to open up to her classmates while Ficelle realizes she should praise her students more. A scream interrupts the party, so Beryl and Ficelle head outside to investigate. They discover magic in the school has suddenly been nullified, and they are attacked by a wolf-like creature.
15	3	"The Old Country Bumpkin Sees Himself in an Old Man"; Transliteration: "Katainaka no Ossan, Rōhai ni Onore o Kasaneru" (Japanese: 片田舎のおっさん、老輩に己を重ねる)	Hiroki Moritomo	Satoshi Ozaki	Shinji Itadaki	July 22, 2026
More shadow wolves begin emerging. While Kirena and the other teachers protect the dorms, Beryl and Ficelle head inside to investigate. Meanwhile, Mewi and her friends successfully destroy a wolf. Back in the school, Beryl and Ficelle fight their way into the basement where they find a wounded Vice Principal Brown. Brown admits that he inadvertently released the wolves when he broke into Lucy's workshop to find the secret of her eternal youth. While Ficelle takes Brown away for treatment and to handle the magic accessory he used, Beryl heads into the sealed chamber where he finds a monster called Lono Ambrosia. Despite his best efforts, Beryl cannot kill Lono Ambrosia since it keeps regenerating. Ficelle returns and she ultimately uses a spell to destroy it in one blow. Beryl then destroys its core. In the aftermath, the reputation of the sword magic class grows. Lucy explains to Beryl that she sealed Lono Ambrosia because she could not find a way to permanently kill it. She also reveals Brown will be punished and laments how he let his fear hold him back, which causes Beryl to wonder how long he will be able to fight with a sword.
16	4	"The Old Country Bumpkin Returns Home"; Transliteration: "Katainaka no Ossan, Kisei Suru" (Japanese: 片田舎のおっさん、帰省する)	Masahiro Ayumu	Kunihiko Okada	Royden B	July 29, 2026
Beryl receives an invitation from his father to return to his home village to help the annual hunt of a herd of saberboar, with Mewi, Curuni, and Henbritz deciding to accompany him. On the way there, Curuni and Henbritz reveal the respective reasons why they joined the Liberion Order. When they arrive at the village, they are welcomed by Beryl's parents, Mordea and Frenne. Mordea warmly greets Mewi and treats her as his granddaughter, and teases Beryl about finding a wife. The next day, while Curuni takes Mewi on a tour of the village, Beryl, Henbritz and Randrid inspect the dojo's students. One of the students, Adel Klein, expresses her distaste for the Order for only protecting the capital but not the rural villages. Henbritz accepts Adel and her brother Edel's challenge to a sparring match to defend the Order's honor. He wins easily thanks to Beryl's lessons, but acknowledges Adel's frustrations, which wins her respect. Once Mordea sends Beryl away on an errand, Henbritz asks if it is really true that Beryl cannot defeat him. Mordea insists that Beryl is being held back by his own lack of self-confidence, though Henbritz suspects he is hiding something.
17	5	"The Old Country Bumpkin Lets Out a Roar"; Transliteration: "Katainaka no Ossan, Otakebi o Ageru" (Japanese: 片田舎のおっさん、雄叫びをあげる)	Masaru Kawashima & Sachio Dobashi	Kunihiko Okada	Kunihisa Sugishima	August 6, 2026 (Note: This episode aired at 12:15 a.m. JST, 30 minutes after the regular air time on TV Asahi.)
Beryl, Curuni, Henbritz, and Randrid head out to scout the saberboars' lair. They soon find a straggler, which Curuni is able to slay on her own and they make camp for the night. The next day, they manage to find the lair as well as the saberboar herd leader, but decide to withdraw back to the village due to an upcoming rainstorm. Once they return, Hebritz challenges Randrid to a duel, and they both end up evenly matched before it is called off for dinner. The next day, Beryl and the group head back up the mountain while the students stay behind to guard the village. Beryl and his companions attack the herd, with Beryl ending up facing the herd leader by himself. Now in a life or death situation, Beryl suddenly feels the urge to take on the herd leader alone and slays it. Meanwhile, Mewi asks Mordea if he or Beryl is the stronger swordsman, with Mordea deciding now is the time to settle that question. Beryl and his party return to the village victorious, and as tales of his feats spread, he continues to wonder why his father put him in charge of the dojo.
18	6	"The Old Country Bumpkin Faces Off Against His Father"; Transliteration: "Katainaka no Ossan, Chichi to Taiji Suru" (Japanese: 片田舎のおっさん、父と対峙する)	Yūta Kida	Kunihiko Okada	Shinji Itadaki	August 13, 2026
The village holds a massive feast to celebrate the successful saberboar hunt. Mordea privately summons Beryl to the dojo where he challenges him to a sparring match to test how much he has grown, promising that he will tell him why he handed the dojo over. Recalling the faith his students have in him, Beryl overcomes his fear and accepts the challenge. As they begin, Beryl is shocked that Mordea appears to be even stronger than when they last sparred, despite his age. While initially outmatched, Beryl realizes that while Mordea is not as strong or fast as his students, he leverages his experience to compensate. Drawing from his own experience, Beryl is finally able to defeat Mordea. Mordea then bluntly explains that he handed over the dojo to Beryl the moment he realized he was stronger than him. The only thing that held Beryl back was his own fear and lack of self-confidence, which he had finally overcome, unlocking his future growth as a swordsman. The next day, Beryl and his companions bid farewell to the village and return to the capital.
19	7	"The Old Country Bumpkin Gets an Invitation from Nobility"; Transliteration: "Katainaka no Ossan, Kizoku ni Manekareru" (Japanese: 片田舎のおっさん、貴族に招かれる)	Hiroki Moritomo	Satoshi Ozaki	Masae Nakayama & Akio Kazumi	August 19, 2026
Beryl receives an invitation from Margrave Flumvelk to a banquet in recognition of the Order's efforts in protecting Princess Salacia, in addition to planning out the details of Salacia's impending marriage. Before leaving, he arranges for Mewi to temporarily stay at the Magic Institute dorms. While Mewi initially has trouble adjusting to the new environment and finds it hard to sleep, she bonds with one of her classmates in the process. Meanwhile, Beryl and Allucia make the journey to Flumvelk's along with two Order knights, Vesper and Frau, who are childhood friends. Vesper asks Beryl for private lessons so he can better protect Frau and fight by her side, which he agrees to. Upon arriving at Flumvelk's estate, Beryl is surprised to see Flumvelk is actually one of his former students, Warren. After catching up, Warren advises Beryl to watch out for women trying to get close to him during the banquet, and decides to assign his younger sister Shueste to keep an eye on him, much to Allucia's jealousy.
20	8	"The Old Country Bumpkin Gets a Marriage Proposal"; Transliteration: "Katainaka no Ossan, Kyūkon Sareru" (Japanese: 片田舎のおっさん、求婚される)	Masahiro Ayumu	Satoshi Ozaki	Shinji Itadaki	August 26, 2026
Shueste suggests the idea of marriage to Beryl, pointing out that both of their families would benefit with Beryl obtaining noble status and the Flumvelk family bloodline guaranteed to be continued. However, Beryl politely turns her down, assuring her that she should marry based on her own personal happiness. Meanwhile, Warren admits to Allucia he is aware of Shueste's plans and while he does not agree with her intentions, he does want to see Beryl get married. He even offers to help Allucia gain Beryl's attention. During the banquet, Beryl defends Shueste from a noble lady attempting to bully her, and reminisces about old times with Warren's father, Gisgarte. Gisgarte also suggests to Beryl to get married and brings up Allucia's attraction to him. On the way back to the capital, Beryl and Allucia's caravan is attacked by assassins. While they are able to repel the attack, many of the caravan guards are either injured or killed, which includes a badly wounded Vesper. Lucy deduces the assassins were from the Verdapis Mercenary Company and were likely hired by the Church of Sphene. She then notices Beryl is uncharacteristically determined, as he wants to get revenge for Vesper.
21	9	"The Old Country Bumpkin Goes to the Holy City"; Transliteration: "Katainaka no Ossan, Kyōto ni Iku" (Japanese: 片田舎のおっさん、教都に行く)	Masaru Kawashima & Takahide Ejiri	Kunihiko Okada	Royden B	September 2, 2026
Allucia informs Beryl that Princess Salacia will be traveling to Sphenedyardvania's Holy City Dilmahakha for her marriage soon, and he agrees to be her bodyguard. To prepare for the journey, Beryl intensifies the Order's training as well as his own so he can be ready to face Verdapis again. Henbritz privately asks Allucia about her feelings for Beryl, but she believes that Beryl already has his heart set for Shueste. The Order then escorts Salacia to the Flumvelk palace as their first stop. Allucia blurts out her anxiety about her feelings to Beryl, but ends the conversation before anything more can be said. That night, Beryl is caught off guard when Shueste decides to personally serve dinner to his room. Shueste then insists that she has come to truly love Beryl, but he asks that she wait until he can resolve his own personal issues before he can give her a proper answer. Meanwhile in Baltrain, Mewi meets Curuni and Ficelle and agrees to run with them every morning. The Order successfully escorts Salacia to Dimahakha and Beryl wonders when Verdapis will attack.
22	10	"The Old Country Bumpkin Sees in the New Year"; Transliteration: "Katainaka no Ossan, Shinnen o Mukaeru" (Japanese: 片田舎のおっさん、新年を迎える)	Yūta Kida	Kunihiko Okada	Kunihisa Sugishima	September 9, 2026
Gatoga shows Beryl and Allucia around Dilmahakha, and he confides to Beryl that Rose left the Holy Order and went into hiding to avoid retaliation from the Pope. Beryl is also anxious about facing Verdapis, as Vesper's injuries mean he will not be able to walk again. Back in Baltrain, Mewi continues to train with Curuni and Ficelle in a makeshift obstacle course. Lucy meets with Bishop Ibroy Howlman, who informs her that the Papists are desperate after suffering numerous setbacks, and he already has agents in place to sabotage their plans as long as Beryl and Allucia can fulfill their duties. In Dimakahakha, the Papists send instructions to a mole in the Holy Order, and are continuing the Sarleon's research, discovering that resurrection magic only works if another life is sacrificed. On the day of the wedding, Beryl, Allucia and Henbritz attend the ceremony but it is suddenly attacked by a combination of reanimated corpses and assassins. As Beryl attempts to hold the attacks off, Verdapis arrives but start attacking the assassins, with Ibroy telling Beryl that Verdapis are their allies.
23	11	"The Old Country Bumpkin Flies into a Rage"; Transliteration: "Katainaka no Ossan, Hageshiku Ikidōru" (Japanese: 片田舎のおっさん、激しく憤る)	Hiroki Moritomo	Kunihiko Okada	Shinji Itadaki	September 16, 2026
With Verdapis' assistance and Henbritz acting as a rearguard, Beryl and the others evacuate into the sewers. Verdapis reveal that they were hired by another mercenary, the White Maiden, to protect Glenn and Salacia. The White Maiden also warned them that the Pope is planning to use resurrection magic to create chimeras that will rampage through the city. Upon seeing the White Maiden, Beryl grudgingly agrees to work with Verdapis. Meanwhile, Mewi continues her training with Curuni and Ficelle, which culminates in a series of sparring sessions. Even though she loses a number of times, Mewi is able to use clever tactics combined with her magic to score a point against Curuni, concluding the training. Back in Dilmahkha, Beryl, Allucia and Verdapis agree to split up to handle the four chimeras attacking the city. Surena also arrives on a special mission from the Guild and agrees to help. Working together, they are able to kill all four chimeras. Beryl lets his guard down after he eliminates his target and is attacked by its snake tail. Once the White Maiden intervenes and saves him, Beryl thanks her for the assistance, revealing her true identity as Rose.
24	12	"The Old Country Bumpkin Goes Home"; Transliteration: "Katainaka no Ossan, Wagaya ni Kaeru" (Japanese: 片田舎のおっさん、我が家に帰る)	Masahiro Ayumu	Kunihiko Okada	Shinji Itadaki	September 23, 2026
Rose confirms her identity to Beryl. They then reunite with Allucia and Surena, and go looking for Verdapis. They are shocked to find the mercenaries have been defeated by the Pope, who admits he intended to use the chimeras as a way to make himself look like a hero. With his plan thwarted, he decides he is going to kill Glenn instead. Beryl and his students attack the Pope, but he has enhanced himself with powerful magic. Allucia and Surena are quickly knocked out, leaving only Beryl and Rose standing. Rose manages to pin the Pope while Beryl stabs him through Rose's shield. Despite being defeated, the Pope remains unrepentant, so Rose executes him. After being rewarded by Glenn, Beryl parts ways with Verdapis, with their leader, Hanoy Cressa, gifting him a knife as a sign of respect. Rose continues to wander Sphenedyardvania as the White Maiden, Surena stays behind to help restore order, and Beryl and Allucia return to Baltrain. Elsewhere, Lucy and Ibroy muse that their plan to eliminate the Pope has succeeded, though Lucy confides that their true success was setting Beryl on the path to become a true master swordsman.

== Reception ==
By January 2024, the series had over 4 million copies in circulation. By August 2024, the series had over 5.5 million copies in circulation.

The manga adaptation was ranked third in the "I Want to Read it Now!" category at Rakuten Kobo's 1st E-book Manga Awards in 2023. The manga, alongside When Marriages Fracture and The Great Snake's Bride, won the 2023 Piccoma Award in the manga category. The manga was also ranked thirteenth at the 9th Next Manga Awards in the web category in 2023. The manga was also ranked second in the 2023 Tsutaya Comic Awards. The manga was also ranked thirteenth in Nationwide Bookstore Employees' Recommended Comics list of 2024.

== See also ==
- Dog & Scissors, another light novel series with the same illustrator
- Magudala de Nemure, another light novel series with the same illustrator
- Reborn as a Space Mercenary, another light novel series with the same illustrator
