= I'm a Curse Crafter, and I Don't Need an S-Rank Party! =

Japanese web novel series

- First light novel volume cover

Sランクパーティから解雇された【呪具師】～『呪いのアイテム』しか作れませんが、その性能はアーティファクト級なり……！～ (Esuranku Patī kara Kaiko Sareta "Jugushi": "Noroi no Aitemu" Shika Tsukuremasenga, Sono Seinō wa Ātifakuto-kyū Nari......!)
- Genre: Fantasy
- Novel series
- Written by: LAgun
- Published by: Shōsetsuka ni Narō; Kakuyomu
- Original run: January 24, 2021 – present
- Manga
- Written by: LAgun
- Illustrated by: Nishiki Ogawa
- Published by: Kodansha
- English publisher: Kodansha
- Imprint: Young Magazine KC
- Magazine: YanMaga Web
- Original run: September 10, 2021 – present
- Volumes: 15
- Light novel
- Written by: LAgun
- Illustrated by: Nishinoda (1–3); Yoshitake (4–)
- Published by: Hobby Japan
- Imprint: HJ Novels
- Original run: February 19, 2022 – present
- Volumes: 4
- Anime television series

I'm a Curse Crafter, and I Don't Need an S-Rank Party! (Japanese: Sランクパーティから解雇された【呪具師】～『呪いのアイテム』しか作れませんが、その性能はアーティファクト級なり……！～, Hepburn: Esuranku Patī kara Kaiko Sareta "Jugushi": "Noroi no Aitemu" Shika Tsukuremasenga, Sono Seinō wa Ātifakuto-kyū Nari......!) is a Japanese web novel series written by LAgun. It began serialization online on the Shōsetsuka ni Narō and Kakuyomu websites in January 2021. A manga adaptation illustrated by Nishiki Ogawa began serialization on Kodansha's YanMaga Web manga website in September 2021, and has been compiled into fifteen tankōbon volumes as of October 2026. A light novel version with illustrations by Nishinoda and Yoshitake and character designs by Ogawa began publication under Hobby Japan's HJ Novels imprint in February 2022. An anime television series adaptation has been announced.

== Plot ==
The series follows Gail Hamilton, an adventurer who is a member of a party called Wolfpack. He has the ability to craft curses. However, due to his apparent lack of usefulness and his low level, Wolfpack decides to remove him from the party after they reached S-Rank. Gail is disappointed by this decision; however, as it turns out, his curse-crafting ability turned out to not only be useful after all but also surprisingly powerful, as his crafted goods turn out to be effective in battle. Believing he no longer needs to be a member of a party to be useful, and finding his quality of life more appealing as a solo adventurer, Gail goes on his own quest, wanting to prove others wrong for being dismissive of him.

== Media ==
=== Web novel ===
Written by LAgun, I'm a Curse Crafter, and I Don't Need an S-Rank Party! began serialization as a web novel on the Shōsetsuka ni Narō and Kakuyomu websites on January 24, 2021.

=== Manga ===
A manga adaptation illustrated by Nishiki Ogawa began serialization on Kodansha's YanMaga Web manga website on September 10, 2021. The manga's chapters have been compiled into fifteen tankōbon volumes as of October 2026.

The manga adaptation's chapters are simultaneously published in English on Kodansha's K Manga app.

No.	Release date	ISBN
1	February 4, 2022	978-4-06-526791-2
2	June 6, 2022	978-4-06-528106-2
3	October 6, 2022	978-4-06-529473-4
4	February 6, 2023	978-4-06-530700-7
5	June 6, 2023	978-4-06-532033-4
6	October 5, 2023	978-4-06-533570-3
7	February 6, 2024	978-4-06-534621-1
8	June 6, 2024	978-4-06-535828-3
9	October 4, 2024	978-4-06-537265-4
10	February 6, 2025	978-4-06-538571-5
11	June 6, 2025	978-4-06-539945-3
12	October 6, 2025	978-4-06-541135-3
13	February 6, 2026	978-4-06-542527-5
14	June 5, 2026	978-4-06-543880-0
15	October 6, 2026	978-4-06-545178-6

=== Light novel ===
A light novel version with illustrations by Nishinoda and Yoshitake and character designs by Ogawa began publication under Hobby Japan's HJ Novels light novel imprint on February 19, 2022. Four volumes volume has been released as of July 2024.

No.	Release date	ISBN
1	February 19, 2022	978-4-7986-2727-4
2	August 19, 2022	978-4-7986-2901-8
3	April 19, 2023	978-4-7986-3163-9
4	July 19, 2024	978-4-7986-3591-0

=== Anime ===
An anime television series adaptation was announced on May 30, 2025.

== Reception ==
By June 2025, the series had over 2.5 million copies in circulation.
