= Duchess in the Attic =

Japanese light novel series

- First light novel volume cover

屋根裏部屋の公爵夫人 (Yane Urabeya no Kōshaku Fujin)
- Genre: Drama; Romance
- Novel series
- Written by: Mori
- Published by: Shōsetsuka ni Narō
- Original run: December 10, 2017 – December 29, 2019
- Light novel
- Written by: Mori
- Illustrated by: Fuyuko Aoi (vol. 1–2); Yasuyuki Shuri (vol. 3); Komeko Amajio (vol. 4–)
- Published by: Fujimi Shobo
- English publisher: NA: J-Novel Club
- Imprint: Kadokawa Books
- Original run: June 9, 2018 – present
- Volumes: 5
- Manga
- Written by: Mori
- Illustrated by: Maki Hayashi
- Published by: Enterbrain
- English publisher: NA: J-Novel Club
- Imprint: B's Log Comics
- Magazine: B's Log Comic
- Original run: March 5, 2019 – present
- Volumes: 7

Duchess in the Attic (屋根裏部屋の公爵夫人, Yane Urabeya no Kōshaku Fujin) is a Japanese light novel series written by Mori and illustrated by Fuyuko Aoi. It was initially serialized on the user-generated novel publishing website Shōsetsuka ni Narō from December 2017 to December 2019. It was later acquired by Fujimi Shobo who began publishing it under their Kadokawa Books imprint in June 2018. A manga adaptation illustrated by Maki Hayashi began serialization in Enterbrain's B's Log Comic online magazine in March 2019.

== Premise ==
Countess Opal was assaulted on the night of high society, leading to malicious slander and the loss of her reputation. Years of isolation later, she finds himself married off to Duke Hubert as a deal to cover his debts. Things are horrible in her newlywed life, being forced to live an attic and treated with hostility by the servants. Making it even more unusual is Hubert's childhood friend Stella already resides in the mansion and the servants all adore her.

Forbidden from helping manage the duchy, Opal has had enough and takes matters into her own hands. A reversal of fortune to outsmart them all will start in the attic.

== Characters ==
Opal Halloway
Slandered as a harlot due to rumors of her assault getting muddied, Opal gives up on ever having a good relationship with Hubert and instead works to save the duchy from both his incompetence and the steward's embezzling. After spending years cleaning up Hubert's mess and forcing him to learn how to do his job, Opal forces a divorce and marries her true love, Claude.
Hubert
Although Hubert holds the title of duke, he is an incompetent and naïve lord and businessman, as he never reads reports and just signing off on them due to trauma from his parents dying in his youth and excessive coddling by the servants. His trauma results in overprotectiveness of Stella, whom is in poor health and his little sister figure. After Opal shows herself capable and intelligent in cleaning up his messes, he developed a crush on her and proposes to have a genuine marriage with her, but she emotionally blackmails him into divorce because of all the trouble he caused her over the years.
Stella
Childhood friend of Hubert who is confined in wheelchair. She loathes Opal for gaining the title of wife, seeing her as an obstacle and remaining completely unaware that Opal was forced into the marriage. Stella has been in love with Hubert for years.
Claude
Opal's childhood friend, former servant and true love. Visiting his mother's relatives in another kingdom, resulted in Claude inheriting his grandfather's title, forced on him by the king as repayment for backing him taking the throne. He and Opal become engaged once she has her freedom, much to the ire of the gold digging women after Claude's rank.

== Media ==
=== Light novel ===
Written by Mori, Duchess in the Attic was initially serialized on the user-generated novel publishing website Shōsetsuka ni Narō from December 10, 2017, to December 29, 2019. It was later acquired by Fujimi Shobo who began publishing the series with illustrations by Fuyuko Aoi under their Kadokawa Books light novel imprint on June 9, 2018. Later volume releases included illustrations by Yasuyuki Shuri (volume 3) and Komeko Amajio (volume 4 onwards) with Aoi credited for character design. Five volumes have been released as of January 10, 2024.

During their panel at Anime Expo 2024, J-Novel Club announced that they had also licensed the novels for English publication.

No.	Original release date	Original ISBN	North American release date	North American ISBN
1	June 9, 2018	978-4-04-072796-7	September 25, 2024	978-1-71-833677-3
2	December 10, 2018	978-4-04-072797-4	December 11, 2024	978-1-71-833679-7
3	October 7, 2022	978-4-04-074551-0	February 19, 2025	978-1-71-833681-0
4	October 10, 2023	978-4-04-075151-1	November 5, 2025	978-1-71-833683-4
5	January 10, 2024	978-4-04-075255-6	February 9, 2026	978-1-71-833685-8

=== Manga ===
A manga adaptation illustrated by Maki Hayashi began serialization in Enterbrain's B's Log Comic online magazine on March 5, 2019. The manga's chapters have been collected into seven tankōbon volumes as of December 2025.

During their panel at Anime NYC 2023, J-Novel Club announced that they had licensed the manga adaptation for English publication.

No.	Original release date	Original ISBN	North American release date	North American ISBN
1	November 30, 2019	978-4-04-735850-8	February 7, 2024	978-1-71-834001-5
Chapters 1–6; Extra
2	February 1, 2021	978-4-04-736493-6	May 15, 2024	978-1-71-834003-9
Chapters 7–12; Extra
3	February 1, 2022	978-4-04-736795-1	August 21, 2024	978-1-71-834005-3
Chapters 13–18; Extra
4	December 27, 2022	978-4-04-737327-3	November 27, 2024	978-1-71-834007-7
Chapters 19–24; Extra
5	December 28, 2023	978-4-04-737787-5	February 19, 2025	978-1-71-834009-1
Chapters 25–29; Extra
6	December 27, 2024	978-4-04-738251-0	August 27, 2025	978-1-71-834011-4
Chapters 30–34; Special chapter; Extra
7	December 27, 2025	978-4-04-738756-0	August 12, 2026	978-1-71-834013-8
Chapters 35–39; Extra

== Reception ==
By December 2025, the series had over 2.4 million copies in circulation.

Alongside Zenryoku de, Aishite Ii Kana?, the manga adaptation won the Women's Comic Prize at the NTT Solmare's Digital Comic Awards 2022.
