= Inside the Tentacle Cave =

Japanese light novel series

- First light novel cover

淫靡な洞窟のその奥で (Inbina Dōkutsu no Sono Oku de)
- Genre: Dark fantasy
- Novel series
- Written by: Umetane
- Published by: Nocturne Novels (Shōsetsuka ni Narō)
- Original run: August 3, 2013 – present
- Light novel
- Written by: Umetane
- Illustrated by: Akufuro (vol. 1–5); Tsukineko (vol. 6–present)
- Published by: Kadokawa Shoten
- Imprint: Osiris Bunko
- Original run: November 6, 2015 – present
- Volumes: 23
- Manga
- Written by: Umetane
- Illustrated by: Abi
- Published by: Kadokawa Shoten
- English publisher: NA: Seven Seas Entertainment
- Imprint: Vamp Comics
- Magazine: Comic Vamp
- Original run: December 10, 2021 – present
- Volumes: 10
- icon

Inside the Tentacle Cave (Japanese: 淫靡な洞窟のその奥で, Hepburn: Inbina Dōkutsu no Sono Oku de) is a Japanese web light novel series written by Umetane and illustrated by Akufuro (volumes 1–5) and Tsukineko (from volume 6 onwards). Umetane first launched the novel on the user-generated novel publishing website Shōsetsuka ni Narō, in the Nocturne Novels male adult section, in August 2013, and Kadokawa Shoten started releasing it on digital volumes in November 2015. A manga adaptation, illustrated by Abi, started on Nico Nico Seiga and ComicWalker websites' section Comic Vamp in December 2021. The manga has been licensed for English release in North America by Seven Seas Entertainment.

== Plot ==
After a slime monster called Black Ooze consumes a human man, it absorbs his knowledge and becomes sexually aggressive, raping female adventurers that encounter it.

== Media ==
=== Light novel ===
Written by Umetane, Inside the Tentacle Cave started on the user-generated novel publishing website Shōsetsuka ni Narō, in the Nocturne Novels male adult section, on August 3, 2013. Kadokawa Shoten started publishing the story in digital volumes, with illustration by Afukuro, on November 6, 2015. Starting with the sixth volume, the artist changed to Tsukineko, and the series has been released under the title Inside the Tentacle Cave: After Disorder (淫靡な洞窟のその奥で After Disorder). As of February 13, 2026, 23 volumes have been released.

=== Manga ===
A manga adaptation, illustrated by Abi, started on Kadokawa Shoten's Nico Nico Seiga and ComicWalker websites' section Comic Vamp on December 10, 2021. Kadokawa Shoten has collected its chapters into individual tankōbon volumes. The first volume was released on June 6, 2022. As of September 4, 2026, ten volumes have been released.

In March 2023, Seven Seas Entertainment announced that they have licensed the manga; it will be released under its Ghost Ship mature imprint starting on October 31 of the same year.

No.	Original release date	Original ISBN	English release date	English ISBN
1	June 6, 2022	978-4-04-681431-9	October 31, 2023	979-8-88843-035-4
2	November 5, 2022	978-4-04-681959-8	March 19, 2024	979-8-88843-412-3
3	May 6, 2023	978-4-04-682541-4	August 13, 2024	979-8-89160-064-5
4	October 6, 2023	978-4-04-682837-8	January 21, 2025	979-8-89160-525-1
5	April 6, 2024	978-4-04-683453-9	August 12, 2025	979-8-89373-152-1
6	September 6, 2024	978-4-04-683839-1	November 25, 2025	979-8-89373-943-5
7	February 6, 2025	978-4-04-684415-6	April 14, 2026	979-8-89561-647-5
8	August 6, 2025	978-4-04-685033-1	October 27, 2026	979-8-89765-920-3
9	February 6, 2026	978-4-04-685666-1	May 4, 2027	979-8-89863-959-4
10	September 4, 2026	978-4-04-660348-7	—	—
