= There's No Way a Side Character Like Me Could Be Popular, Right? =

Japanese light novel series

- Cover of light novel volume 1 published by Overlap

友人キャラの俺がモテまくるわけないだろ？ (Yūjin Kyara no Ore ga Motemakuru Wakenai Daro?)
- Genre: Romantic comedy
- Novel series
- Written by: Sekaiichi
- Published by: Shōsetsuka ni Narō
- Original run: May 15, 2018 – present
- Light novel
- Written by: Sekaiichi
- Illustrated by: Tomari (first 2 volumes); Tom Osabe (from volume 3)
- Published by: Overlap
- English publisher: NA: Tentai Books
- Imprint: Overlap Bunko
- Original run: July 25, 2019 – present
- Volumes: 5
- Manga
- Written by: Sekaiichi
- Illustrated by: Harumare
- Published by: Ichijinsha
- Magazine: Manga 4-koma Palette (February 22, 2021–February 22, 2022); Ichijinplus (March 26, 2022–June 27, 2022)
- Original run: February 22, 2021 – June 27, 2022
- Volumes: 2

There's No Way a Side Character Like Me Could Be Popular, Right? (友人キャラの俺がモテまくるわけないだろ?, Yūjin Kyara no Ore ga Motemakuru Wakenai Daro?) is a Japanese romantic comedy light novel series written by Sekaiichi and illustrated by Tomari (first two volumes) and Tom Osabe (from third volume). The series was initially launched as a web novel on May 15, 2018, on Shōsetsuka ni Narō. Overlap released a revised version of the series with illustrations in July 2019, under its Overlap Bunko imprint. The series began publishing in English by Tentai Books from May 29, 2020. A manga adaptation illustrated by Harumare began serialization in Ichijinsha's Manga 4-koma Palette magazine in February 2021 before being moved to Ichijinplus in March 2022.

== Plot ==
Yuuki Tomoki, a second year high school student, is shunned by everyone because of his somewhat intimidating appearance with large scars under his eyes and strangely pale skin. One day, Touka Ike, the younger sister of Yuuji's best friend, confessed to him when they hadn't seen each other for long. Yuuji refused however Touka proposed a "fake lover" relationship to draw his brother's attention to her.

== Characters ==
Yuuji Tomoki (友木 優児, Tomoki Yuuji)
The main character of the story, Yuuji is a 2nd year high school student. In the series, he is often feared by other students because of his pale white skin and a scar under his eye.
Touka Ike (池 冬華, Ike Touka)
Haruma's sister, Yuuji's best friend. In the first chapter of the manga adaptation, when she and Yuuji had just met not long ago, she confessed her love to Yuuji but Yuuji disagreed and she was the one who was talking about "fake lover".
Kana Hasaki (葉咲 夏奈, Hasaki Kana)
Haruma and Touka's childhood friend. In the series, Kana seems to be somewhat afraid of Yuuji.
Chiaki Makiri (真桐 千秋, Makiri Chiaki)
Teacher of Yuuji School, she is a person with a good personality and is not afraid of Yuuji's appearance.
Haruma Ike (池 春馬, Ike Haruma)
Yuuji's best friend. In the series, Hamura is described as the most popular in school for his looks and personality, however he is also said to be not very intelligent in everyday matters.

== Media ==
=== Light novel ===
The light novel series is written by Sekaiichi and illustrated by Tomari (first two volumes) and Tom Osabe (from third volume). The series was published as a web novel from May 15, 2018, on Shōsetsuka ni Narō. Overlap released an illustrated version on July 25, 2019, under its Overlap Bunko imprint. The English version was published by Tentai Books from May 29, 2020.

No.	Original release date	Original ISBN	English release date	English ISBN
1	July 25, 2019	978-4-86554-520-3	May 29, 2020	978-8-41220-080-5
2	November 26, 2019	978-4-86554-571-5	October 25, 2020	978-8-41220-085-0
3	August 25, 2020	978-4-86554-641-5	February 7, 2022	978-8-41905-605-4
4	January 26, 2021	978-4-86554-803-7	—	—
5	July 26, 2021	978-4-86554-958-4	—	—

=== Manga ===
A manga adaptation illustrated by Harumare was serialized in Ichijinsha's Manga 4-koma Palette magazine from February 22, 2021, to February 22, 2022, and began serialization in Ichijinsha's Ichijinplus manga website on March 26, 2022. Its manga chapters have been collected in two tankōbon volumes as of July 2022.

No.	Japanese release date	Japanese ISBN
1	July 20, 2021	978-4-75808-370-6
2	July 22, 2022	978-4-75808-380-5

== See also ==
- My Friend's Little Sister Has It In for Me!, another light novel series illustrated by the same illustrator
- Spy Classroom, another light novel series illustrated by the same illustrator
