= Accomplishments of the Duke's Daughter =

Japanese light novel series

- Volume 1, Japanese light novel

公爵令嬢の嗜み (Kōshaku Reijō no Tashinami)
- Novel series
- Written by: Reia
- Published by: Shōsetsuka ni Narō (Self-published)
- Original run: February 7, 2015 – September 3, 2017
- Light novel
- Written by: Reia
- Illustrated by: Futaba Hazuki
- Published by: Fujimi Shobo
- English publisher: NA: Seven Seas Entertainment
- Imprint: Kadokawa Books
- Original run: November 2015 – December 2018
- Volumes: 8
- Manga
- Written by: Reia
- Illustrated by: Suki Umemiya
- Published by: Kadokawa Shoten
- English publisher: NA: Seven Seas Entertainment
- Magazine: Young Ace Up
- Original run: December 22, 2015 – present
- Volumes: 8
- Novel series

Koushaku Reijo no Setsumeishou (Lit: The Manual of a Duke's Daughter)
- Written by: Reia
- Published by: Shōsetsuka ni Narō (Self-published)
- Original run: April 14, 2015 – September 20, 2015
- Novel series

Buke no Tashinami (lit. Common Sense of a Warrior)
- Written by: Reia
- Published by: Shōsetsuka ni Narō (Self-published)
- Original run: July 3, 2016 – December 2, 2018

Accomplishments of the Duke's Daughter (Japanese: 公爵令嬢の嗜み, Hepburn: Kōshaku Reijō no Tashinami) is a Japanese isekai light novel series written by Reia, featuring artwork by Futaba Hazuki. The series was initially self-published on Shōsetsuka ni Narō starting on February 7, 2015, and Fujimi Shobo began publishing a light novel version in November of the same year. The web novelization ended on September 3, 2017, and the final light novel was released in December 2018. A manga adaptation by the same name was released through Young Ace UP, the free web comic magazine of Young Ace, starting on December 22, 2015, and is currently being released in English by Seven Seas Entertainment. The English translation is done by Alexander Keller-Nelson.

The author has released several spin-off series as web novels.

== Plot ==
A young Japanese office lady is killed in a vehicular accident. After losing consciousness, she awakens in another world in the body of Iris, the antagonist of an otome game she had been playing before her demise. To her shock, she discovers that she has reincarnated at the exact moment where Iris' former fiancé, Prince Edward, confronts her in front of the entire school over her bullying of Yuri, the illegitimate daughter of a baron and the game's heroine. Thinking fast, Iris manages to leave the school with her dignity intact and upon returning home, is also able to avoid being sent to a nunnery, the fate of the original Iris. Impressed by her rational thinking, Iris's father Duke Louis de Armelia leaves her in control of the Armelia fief in place of her brother Bern, who is one of Edward's supporters and is also in love with Yuri.

As the series progresses, Iris uses her previous life's knowledge to bring about major, positive changes to her fief and the kingdom, such as the concept of banking and schooling for commoners who would otherwise not receive education. She also introduces commercial products that had not previously existed or were only available in a crude form, such as chocolate and cosmetics, going so far as to start her own successful corporation. This brings both positive and negative attention to Iris, her family, and the fief, especially as it angers Prince Edward, who wanted her to be severely punished. It's also shown that Iris was not responsible for all of the bullying claimed by Yuri, as she had only spread rumors and made negative comments, and that Iris was a far kinder person than the one portrayed in the game's storyline. Furthermore, Yuri's personality is shown to possibly be a facade. It is also hinted that she is a foreign spy sent to disrupt the kingdom and that she is purposefully draining the kingdom's finances via Edward under the guise of charity in order to weaken it against an impending invasion.

Iris finds herself and her family stuck in the middle of a succession crisis over the throne, as there is a vocal faction of people who support Edward's older brother Alfred, who is reported to be traveling to gain more support as well as to avoid assassination by his stepmother, the mother of Edward.

== Characters ==
=== Almeria family, servants, and employees ===
Iris Lana Almeria
She is the first daughter of the Duke and Prime Minister, Louis de Armelia. The in-game version of Iris was portrayed as a villain who was sent to a nunnery as a result of her actions. The real version of Iris is shown to be more generous and kind, as she has gone out of her way to rescue several children from dying in abject poverty and giving them jobs as servants in her mansion. Although she has managed to prevent herself from being sent to a nunnery, Iris was still expelled from school and sent to her home fief, where she serves as its acting lord due to her brother's support of Edward's actions.
Bern Tashi Almeria
Iris's brother, Bern was a love interest in the otome game. He was present when Edward confronted Iris and supported his actions, going so far as to publicly denounce her as well. These actions cost him much of his parents' respect and as a result Iris is appointed as the acting lord instead of him. He is initially indignant and resentful of his father's actions but comes to respect his sister after witnessing the amount of time and hard work she has put into the job. This, along with a scolding from his father for neglecting his responsibilities, also causes Bern to see Yuri in a different light after she suggests dismantling the military force in order to fund meals for the poor. He then begins to support his sister and family, his love for Yuri destroyed.
Duke Louis de Armelia
Iris's father and the Prime Minister. He supports the royal family and gives them advice. He was against Iris marrying Edward because it would give them too much political power and put their family at risk.
Merellis Reiser Armelia
Iris's mother, she helps support Iris's business ventures and is a major person of influence and power in social circles.
Tanya
Iris's personal maid, she almost starved to death as a child due to her being a poverty-stricken orphan. Due to Iris rescuing her and nursing her back to health, as well as giving her a secure position within the Almeria household, she is completely loyal to her mistress.
Lyle
Iris's bodyguard.
Dida
Iris's bodyguard.
Rehme
Librarian of the Almeria family library.
Sebastian
Head butler.
Moneda
Sei
Iris's Footman.
Merida
Iris's Family's Chef.

=== Royal family ===
Prince Alfred of Tasmeria/Dean
He is the first prince of Tasmeria. He was not present in the otome game but was mentioned. Some of his supporters want him to ascend the throne, as they view Edward as too much of a liability to trust with that much power. The prince spends much of his time away from the royal capital due to the risk of being assassinated by his step-mother, who views both him and his little sister (who were birthed by the first queen) as a threat to their half-brother Edward's ability to rule. He spends much of his time under the alias of Dean and working for Iris, who he eventually comes to love.
Prince Edward of Tasmeria
Iris's former fiancé, Edward's in-game portrayal is in sharp contrast to his real personality, which is hot-headed and impulsive. This causes many to see him as a poor choice for king, as they believe that he is incapable of making wise decisions for the kingdom. These fears are exacerbated by his relationship with Yuri, as he is blind to the fact that Yuri's spending, along with that of the Queen, has almost completely drained the kingdom's finances. His hatred of Iris is also a factor, as he is willing to alienate and even destroy her duchy to seek retribution, which would have lasting negative repercussions for the entire kingdom and put them at risk.
Princess Leticia of Tasmeria
She is Alfred's sister and Edward's half-sister.
After Edward is desposed of, Leticia ascends to the throne; with Bern as her prince consort. This allows Dean to use the mistaken assumption that he died on the battlefield, to live with Iris.
Queen Ellia Tasmenia
Edward's mother and the step-mother of Alfred and his younger sister Leticia. It is implied in the series that she caused the death of the first queen so she could take her place.
Dowager Queen Arya Von Tasmeria
She is the grandmother of Alfred, Edward, and Leticia. She supports Alfred as the next king, as she is unconvinced that Edward would make a wise ruler. The Dowager Queen has an extremely strong political and social presence. She was enamored with the beauty of Iris's mother in the past; taking a protective fondness of Iris herself, due to the resemblance and Iris's own accomplishments.
King Tasmenia
He is absent for much of the series as he is in poor health. Due to such, his second wife is causing the kingdom to slowly collapse; without him to reign her in.
Dean won't let the King near his sister, due the strong resemblance to his late wife; their father would imprison her in the palace as a sort of pet, due to his unstable mind.

=== Other nobles ===
Van Lutasha
The son of the current Pope and one of the capturable love interests in the game, Van is infatuated with Yuri.
Dorsen Katabelia
The son of the commander of the Royal Guards, Dorsen is another love interests in the game. He is initially infatuated with Yuri but becomes disillusioned with her over time.
Yuri Neuer
She is the main character in the game, where she is portrayed as an honest and innocent young lady. In the series this is shown to be an act as she was actually sent by Tasmenia's enemies to serve as a spy and to disrupt the kingdom from the inside so that it could be conquered. She is the illegitimate daughter of a baron and grew up in poverty, which is her reason for disliking the kingdom of Tasmenia and trying to cause its downfall.
Yuri herself is a pawn and only realizes Edward truly loved her after he takes a deathblow for her.

== Media ==
=== Web novelization ===
Accomplishments of the Duke's Daughter was initially self-published through the novel publishing website Shōsetsuka ni Narō. The series is composed of 265 chapters starting on February 7, 2015, and ending on September 3, 2017. The series was popular and had over 145 million page views.

=== Light novels ===
Starting in November 2015, Fujimi Shobo began publishing a light novel version of the series on the light novel Imprint Kadokawa Books. The light novel series was completed in December 2018 with eight volumes. The series was popular in Japan and sold approximately 500,000 copies. Seven Seas Entertainment has also licensed the light novels, with the first volume released in print in July 2021.

No.	Original release date	Original ISBN	English release date	English ISBN
1	November 10, 2015	978-4-04-103742-3	July 6, 2021	978-1-64-827421-3
Chapter 1: The Duke's Daughter Reverses Fate; Chapter 2: The Duke's Daughter Sets Out on a Trip; Chapter 3: The Duke's Daughter Runs the Show; Chapter 4: The Duke's Daughter Faces off against Her Brother; Chapter 5: The Duke's Daughter's Heart Quivers
2	April 9, 2016	978-4-04-104180-2	September 7, 2021	978-1-64827-439-8
Chapter 6: The Duke's Daughter Goes to War; Chapter 7: The Duke's Daughter, Busy in the Capita...; Chapter 8: The Duke's Daughter Gets to Work in Armelia; Chapter 9: The Duke's Daughter and the Scandal; Chapter 10: The Duke's Daughter Counterattacks
3	September 10, 2016	978-4-04-104181-9	November 2, 2021	978-1-64827-456-5
Chapter 11: The Duke's Daughter, Talk of the Town; Chapter 12: The Duke's Daughter Settles Things; Chapter 13: The Duke's Daughter Returns Home; Chapter 14: The Duke's Daughter Has a Bad Feeling; Chapter 15: The Duke's Daughter Makes Her Move; Chapter 16: The Duke's Daughter Heads into Danger; Chapter 17: The Duke's Daughter Speaks on Crimes Committed
4	March 10, 2017	978-4-04-105468-0	January 20, 2022	978-1-64827-833-4
Chapter 18: The Duke's Daughter Rejoices in Daily Routine; Chapter 19: The Duke's Daughter Sets off Sparks; Chapter 20: The Duke's Daughter Mourns; Chapter 21: The Duke's Daughter Prepares for War
5	September 8, 2017	978-4-04-105469-7	June 7, 2022	978-1-63858-287-8
Chapter 22: The Duke's Daughter and Her Mother's Strength; Chapter 23: The Duke's Daughter Makes Preparations; Chapter 24: The Duke's Daughter's Responsibility; Chapter 25: The Duke's Daughter and the War; Chapter 26: The Duke's Daughter Settles Things; Final Chapter: The Duke's Daughter's Happiness
6	March 10, 2018	978-4-04-106322-4	September 13, 2022	978-1-63858-593-0
Prologue: The Duke's Daughter's Curiosity; Chapter 1: The Duchess's Origins; Chapter 2: The Future Duchess Experiences a Setback; Chapter 3: The Future Duchess Dreams; Chapter 4: The Future Duchess Looks Ahead; Interlude
7	September 10, 2018	978-4-04-106323-1	December 27, 2022	978-1-63858-697-5
Interlude: The Duchess Ponders Peace; Chapter 5: The Future Duchess's Shattered Dreams; Chapter 6: The Future Duchess Faces Forward; Chapter 7: The Future Duchess Finds Kindred Spirits; Chapter 8: The Future Duchess's Social Debut; Chapter 9: The Future Duchess Attends the Academy
8	December 10, 2018	978-4-04-107508-1	March 21, 2023	978-1-63858-859-7
Chapter 10: Romello's Battle; Chapter 11: The Future Duchess's Break; Chapter 12: Separate Battles; Chapter 13: The Future Duchess Learns the Truth; Chapter 14: The Future Duchess Stands on the Battlefield; Epilogue: The Duchess's Daughter Takes Over

=== Manga ===
A manga adaptation of Accomplishments of the Duke's Daughter by Suki Umemiya began publication on Kadokawa Shoten's Young Ace website Young Ace UP starting on December 22, 2015. The first volume of the series was released the following year on September 10. The series is licensed in English by Seven Seas Entertainment and the first volume was released on August 7, 2018.

No.	Original release date	Original ISBN	English release date	English ISBN
1	September 10, 2016	978-4-04-104802-3	August 7, 2018	978-1-626928-66-4
2	March 10, 2017	978-4-04-105339-3	December 4, 2018	978-1-626929-66-1
3	September 8, 2017	978-4-04-106095-7	April 23, 2019	978-1-642750-18-8
4	March 10, 2018	978-4-04-106556-3	August 13, 2019	978-1-642751-14-7
5	November 2, 2018	978-4-04-107490-9	November 5, 2019	978-1-642757-26-2
6	August 3, 2019	978-4-041084-87-8	August 25, 2020	978-1-645052-32-6
7	March 3, 2020	978-4-041092-28-6	December 22, 2020	978-1-64505-731-4
8	July 9, 2021	978-4-041099-19-3	May 3, 2022	978-1-64827-909-6

== Reception ==
Rebecca Silverman of Anime News Network reviewed the first volume of the manga adaptation and gave it an overall grade of C+, stating that it was an "Interesting take on the genre, Iris's plans are solid, nice cast of characters" but that the "Adaptation feels like a condensing of the novels, not much character work".

== See also ==
- My Next Life as a Villainess: All Routes Lead to Doom!, an ongoing light novel also set in the world of an otome game
