= Watashi no Ofuru de Waruin dakedo =

Japanese web novel series

- Watashi no Ofuru de Waruin dakedo to Okaa-sama (Heroine) ni Torimaki o Oshitsukerare, Totsuida Henkyō demo Yome Atsukai Saremasen ga, Okage de Jiyū ni Ikiremasu!

【私のおふるで悪いんだけど】 とお母様(ヒロイン）に取り巻きを押し付けられ、嫁いだ辺境でも嫁扱いされませんが、おかげで自由に生きれます！ (Watashi no Ofuru de Waruin dakedo to Okaa-sama (Hiroin) ni Torimaki o Oshitsukerare, Totsuida Henkyō demo Yome Atsukai Saremasen ga, Okage de Jiyū ni Ikiremasu!)
- Genre: Romance
- Novel series
- Written by: Puri
- Published by: Shōsetsuka ni Narō
- Original run: February 8, 2024 – May 16, 2024
- Anime
- Directed by: Junichi Sato (chief)
- Studio: Nagomi

Watashi no Ofuru de Waruin dakedo to Okaa-sama (Heroine) ni Torimaki o Oshitsukerare, Totsuida Henkyō demo Yome Atsukai Saremasen ga, Okage de Jiyū ni Ikiremasu! (【私のおふるで悪いんだけど】 とお母様(ヒロイン）に取り巻きを押し付けられ、嫁いだ辺境でも嫁扱いされませんが、おかげで自由に生きれます！, Watashi no Ofuru de Waruin dakedo to Okaa-sama (Hiroin) ni Torimaki o Oshitsukerare, Totsuida Henkyō demo Yome Atsukai Saremasen ga, Okage de Jiyū ni Ikiremasu!; lit. 'My Mother [the Heroine] Married Me Away Like Second-Hand Goods to One of Her Followers, But I'm Not Treated Like a New Bride in the Remote Region I Moved to, and Now I Get to Live Freely!') is a Japanese web novel series written by Puri. It was serialized online from February to May 2024 on the user-generated novel publishing website Shōsetsuka ni Narō. A printed version of the novel series is currently in production. An anime adaptation produced by Nagomi has been announced.

== Media ==
=== Web novel ===
Written by Puri, Watashi no Ofuru de Waruin dakedo to Okaa-sama (Heroine) ni Torimaki o Oshitsukerare, Totsuida Henkyō demo Yome Atsukai Saremasen ga, Okage de Jiyū ni Ikiremasu! was serialized as a web novel on the Shōsetsuka ni Narō website from February 8 to May 16, 2024. A print version of the novel is currently in production.

=== Anime ===
An anime adaptation was announced during the award ceremony for the Aniseka Novel Award on September 17, 2025. It will be produced by Nagomi, with Junichi Sato serving as chief director.

== Reception ==
The series won the grand prize at the Aniseka Novel Award in 2025.
