= Dungeon Kurashi no Moto Yūsha =

Japanese light novel series

- First light novel volume cover

ダンジョン暮らしの元勇者
- Genre: Fantasy
- Novel series
- Written by: Ryūnosuke Minesaki
- Published by: Nocturne Novels (Shōsetsuka ni Narō)
- Original run: September 30, 2015 – present
- Light novel
- Written by: Ryūnosuke Minesaki
- Illustrated by: Magukappu
- Published by: Kill Time Communication
- Imprint: Beginning Novels
- Original run: January 29, 2016 – present
- Volumes: 4
- Manga
- Written by: Ryūnosuke Minesaki
- Illustrated by: Nagi Shikage
- Published by: Kill Time Communication
- Magazine: Comic Valkyrie
- Original run: June 18, 2018 – present
- Volumes: 8
- icon

Dungeon Kurashi no Moto Yūsha (ダンジョン暮らしの元勇者, Danjon Kurashi no Moto Yūsha) is a Japanese light novel series written by Ryūnosuke Minesaki. It originally began as a web novel posted on the Nocturne Novels section of the Shōsetsuka ni Narō website in September 2015. Kill Time Communication began publishing it as a light novel in January 2016, featuring illustrations by Magukappu. A manga adaptation illustrated by Nagi Shikage began serialization in June 2018 and has been compiled into eight tankōbon volumes as of July 2026.

== Plot ==
The series follows Blum Dilmond, a warrior who recently defeated the Demon Lord but is now trying to escape assassins who sent to kill him. Wanting to find a good hiding spot, he decides to go to the Demon Lord's old hideout. While exploring, he encounters Al, his former companion, and Irene, one of the Demon Lord's former maids. The three decide to create a party.

== Media ==
=== Light novels ===
The series was originally posted as a web novel posted on the Nocturne Novels section of the Shōsetsuka ni Narō website beginning on September 30, 2015. It was later picked up for publication by Kill Time Communication, with the first volume being published on January 29, 2016, under their Beginning Novels imprint. Four volumes have been released as of March 2022.

=== Manga ===
A manga adaptation illustrated by Nagi Shikage began serialization on Kill Time Communication's Comic Valkyrie service on June 18, 2018. The first volume was released on July 30, 2019; eight volumes have been released as of July 2026.

== Reception ==
It was reported at the release of the seventh volume that the manga had sold over 640,000 copies.
