= History of the Kingdom of the Orcsen =

Japanese light novel series

- History of the Kingdom of the Orcsen: How the Barbarian Orcish Nation Came to Burn Down the Peaceful Elfland
- First light novel volume cover

オルクセン王国史～野蛮なオークの国は、如何にして平和なエルフの国を焼き払うに至ったか～ (Orukusen Ōkokushi: Yaban na Oruku no Kuni wa, Ikanishite Heiwa na Erufu no Kuni o Yakiharau ni Itatta ka)
- Genre: Modern fantasy; War
- Novel series
- Written by: Kyōichirō Tarumi
- Published by: Shōsetsuka ni Narō
- Original run: July 1, 2021 – present
- Light novel
- Written by: Kyōichirō Tarumi
- Illustrated by: Thores Shibamoto
- Published by: Hifumi Shobo
- English publisher: NA: Seven Seas Entertainment
- Imprint: Saga Forest
- Original run: December 15, 2023 – present
- Volumes: 7
- Manga
- Written by: Kyōichirō Tarumi
- Illustrated by: Takeshi Nogami
- Published by: Hifumi Shobo
- English publisher: NA: Seven Seas Entertainment
- Imprint: Nova Comics
- Magazine: Comic Nova
- Original run: January 12, 2024 – present
- Volumes: 7

History of the Kingdom of the Orcsen: How the Barbarian Orcish Nation Came to Burn Down the Peaceful Elfland (オルクセン王国史～野蛮なオークの国は、如何にして平和なエルフの国を焼き払うに至ったか～, Orukusen Ōkokushi: Yaban na Oruku no Kuni wa, Ikanishite Heiwa no Erufu no Kuni o Yakiharau ni Itatta ka) is a Japanese light novel series written by Kyōichirō Tarumi and illustrated by Thores Shibamoto. It began serialization as a web novel on Shōsetsuka ni Narō in July 2021. It was later acquired by Hifumi Shobo who began publishing it under their Saga Forest imprint in December 2023. A manga adaptation illustrated by Takeshi Nogami began serialization on Hifumi Shobo's Comic Nova website in January 2024.

== Synopsis ==
The series is set in a world of "guns and magic" where science and technology have advanced while magic still exists. A dark elf arrives in Orcsen, a nation formed by a group of orcs and other demons. Introducing herself as Dinerus, the dark elf claims that in Orcsen's neighboring country, Elfind, the white elves are ethnically cleansing the dark elves. Coincidentally, war with Elfind is just a matter of time in Orcsen, and King Gustav of Orcsen proposes to Dinerus that she form a cavalry unit of exiled dark elves. Dinerus accepts, and to seek revenge against the white elves and to repay her debt of gratitude to Gustav, who saved her life and the lives of 12,000 of her compatriots, she throws herself into the war against her former homeland.

== Media ==
=== Light novel ===
Written by Kyōichirō Tarumi, History of the Kingdom of the Orcsen: How the Barbarian Orcish Nation Came to Burn Down the Peaceful Elfland began serialization as a web novel on Shōsetsuka ni Narō on July 1, 2021. It was later acquired by Hifumi Shobo who began publishing it with illustrations by Thores Shibamoto on December 15, 2023. Seven volumes have been released as of August 12, 2026.

During their panel at Anime NYC 2025, Seven Seas Entertainment announced that they had licensed the series for English publication, with the first volume set to release in June 2026.

No.	Original release date	Original ISBN	North American release date	North American ISBN
1	December 15, 2023	978-4-824-20075-4	July 28, 2026	979-8-89765-439-0
1. Part 1: "The Peaceful Country of Orcs"; 2. Chapter 1: "The Border River"; 3. Chapter 2: "The Land of Abundance"; 4. Chapter 3: "The Generals' Hill"; 5. Chapter 4: "Divisional Maneuvers"; 6. Chapter 5: "When the Rain Falls"; 7. Chapter 6: "The Anfanglir Brigade"; Short Story: "Sleepless Wolves"
2	June 14, 2024	978-4-824-20186-7	November 24, 2026	979-8-89765-440-6
3	October 15, 2024	978-4-824-20316-8	March 30, 2027	979-8-89765-441-3
4	February 15, 2025	978-4-824-20388-5	—	—
5	June 13, 2025	978-4-824-20450-9	—	—
6	November 14, 2025	978-4-824-20536-0	—	—
7	August 12, 2026	978-4-824-20727-2; 978-4-824-20741-8 (SE)	—	—

=== Manga ===
A manga adaptation illustrated by Takeshi Nogami began serialization on Hifumi Shobo's Comic Nova website on January 12, 2024. The manga's chapters have been compiled into seven tankōbon volumes as of August 2026.

During their panel at Anime NYC 2025, Seven Seas Entertainment announced that they had also licensed the manga adaptation for English publication, with the first volume set to release in July 2026.

No.	Original release date	Original ISBN	North American release date	North American ISBN
1	May 24, 2024	978-4-824-20178-2	July 7, 2026	979-8-89765-437-6
1. "The River on the Border"; 2. "Fertile Lands"; 3. "The Generals' Hill"
2	September 25, 2024	978-4-824-20258-1	November 10, 2026	979-8-89765-438-3
3	January 24, 2025	978-4-824-20369-4	March 9, 2027	979-8-89765-604-2
4	April 25, 2025	978-4-824-20423-3	—	—
5	October 24, 2025	978-4-824-20503-2	—	—
6	March 25, 2026	978-4-824-20606-0	—	—
7	August 25, 2026	978-4-824-20733-3; 978-4-824-20742-5 (SE)	—	—

== Reception ==
The series won the Gold Prize at the 2nd Hifumi Shobo Web Novel Awards in 2022. The series was ranked third in the tankōbon category at the 2024 Next Light Novel Awards. The series was ranked 10th in the Tankōbon and Novel category in the 2026 edition of Takarajimasha's Kono Light Novel ga Sugoi! guidebook.

The manga adaptation was a prize winner in the "I Want to Deliver It to the World" category at the 3rd Rakuten Kobo E-book Awards.

== See also ==
- Attack on Titan: Before the Fall, another light novel series with the same illustrator
- Trinity Blood, another light novel series with the same illustrator
- Vatican Miracle Examiner, another light novel series with the same illustrator
