= Himekishi ga Classmate! =

Japanese light novel series

- Himekishi ga Classmate! Isekai Cheat de Dorei-ka Harem
- First light novel volume cover

姫騎士がクラスメート！ 〜異世界チートで奴隷化ハーレム〜 (Himekishi ga Kurasumēto! Isekai Chīto de Dorei-ka Hāremu)
- Genre: Isekai
- Novel series
- Written by: EKZ
- Published by: Nocturne Novels (Shōsetsuka ni Narō)
- Original run: June 23, 2014 – October 22, 2016
- Light novel
- Written by: EKZ
- Illustrated by: Megane Yoshizawa
- Published by: Kill Time Communication
- Imprint: Beginning Novels
- Original run: February 3, 2015 – October 4, 2016
- Volumes: 4
- Manga
- Written by: EKZ
- Illustrated by: No.Gomesu; Utsusemi (original draft)
- Published by: Kill Time Communication
- Magazine: Comic Valkyrie
- Original run: May 1, 2015 – present
- Volumes: 10

Himekishi ga Classmate! Isekai Cheat de Dorei-ka Harem (姫騎士がクラスメート！ 〜異世界チートで奴隷化ハーレム〜, Himekishi ga Kurasumēto! Isekai Chīto de Dorei-ka Hāremu) is a Japanese light novel series written by EKZ and illustrated by Megane Yoshizawa. It was originally published as a web novel on the online publishing platform Shōsetsuka ni Narō's male adult section Nocturne Novels from June 2014 to October 2016, before being published as a light novel by Kill Time Communication under their Beginning Novels imprint in four volumes between February 2015 and June 2016. A manga adaptation illustrated by No.Gomesu and featuring designs by Utsusemi began serialization on Kill Time Communication's Comic Valkyrie service in May 2015 and has been compiled into ten volumes as of October 2026.

== Plot ==
The series follows Tōru Odamori, a high school student who was killed when the bus his class was traveling on exploded during a school trip. Finding himself reincarnated in another world, he becomes a slavemancer, a person with the ability to turn people into slaves. He builds a harem of women, led by Kirika, a Princess Knight who is the reincarnation of one of his classmates.

== Characters ==
Tōru (トオル)
In his previous life, he was Tōru Odamori (小田森 トオル), an unremarkable high school student with no friends. After dying in a bus accident, he is reincarnated in another world, where he gains the power to turn people into slaves. He uses this power to build a harem.
Kirika (キリカ)
In her previous life, she was Kirika Himeno (姫野 桐華), Tōru's class representative. She has a serious personality with a disdain for lewd things. Having only interacted with Tōru once prior to their deaths, she is reincarnated as a Princess Knight, serving Princess Systina of the Kingdom of Lambardia. Tōru uses his magic on her to turn her into one of his slaves.
Nina (ニーナ, Nīna)
A magician girl who was Tōru's first slave. She refers to him as "Master".
Amelia (アメリア, Ameria)
One of Tōru's slaves. She has long hair and has a warrior personality.
Sierra (シエラ, Shiera)
An elf girl who is one of Tōru's slaves. She is skilled in archery.
Palmyura (パルミューラ, Parumyūra)
A demon girl and one of Tōru's slaves. She originally opposed him prior to her enslavement.
Systina (システィナ, Shisutina)
The princess of the Kingdom of Lambardia, whom Kirika serves. She had dreams of meeting Tōru in the past and later has sex with him.

== Media ==
=== Light novel ===
EKZ originally posted the series as a web novel on Nocturne Novels, the male adult section of the online publishing platform Shōsetsuka ni Narō, from June 23, 2014, to October 22, 2016. It was later picked up for publication by Kill Time Communication, which published it as a light novel under their Beginning Novels imprint with illustrations by Megane Yoshizawa. Four volumes were released between February 3, 2015, and October 4, 2016.

=== Manga ===
A manga adaptation drafted by Utsusemi and illustrated by No.Gomesu began serialization on Kill Time Communication's Comic Valkyrie service on May 1, 2015. The series has been compiled into ten tankōbon volumes as of October 2026.
