= Akuyaku no Goreisoku no Dōnika Shitai Nichijō =

Japanese light novel series

- First light novel volume cover

悪役のご令息のどうにかしたい日常
- Genre: Isekai
- Novel series
- Written by: Uma no Koe ga Kikoeru
- Published by: Moonlight Novels (Shōsetsuka ni Narō)
- Original run: January 2, 2020 – present
- Light novel
- Written by: Uma no Koe ga Kikoeru
- Illustrated by: Kōki.
- Published by: Ichijinsha
- Imprint: Ichijinsha Novels
- Original run: June 2, 2021 – present
- Volumes: 6 + 1 side story collection
- Manga
- Written by: Uma no Koe ga Kikoeru
- Illustrated by: Nimu Fuwai
- Published by: Ichijinsha
- Imprint: Zero Sum Comics
- Magazine: Zero Sum Online
- Original run: February 4, 2022 – present
- Volumes: 8

Akuyaku no Goreisoku no Dōnika Shitai Nichijō (悪役のご令息のどうにかしたい日常) is a Japanese light novel series written by Uma no Koe ga Kikoeru and illustrated by Kōki. It initially began serialization on the Moonlight Novels female adult section of Shōsetsuka ni Narō in January 2020. It was later acquired by Ichijinsha who began publishing the series under its Ichijinsha Novels light novel imprint in June 2021. A manga adaptation illustrated by Nimu Fuwai began serialization on Ichijinsha's Zero Sum Online manga website in February 2022.

== Plot ==
Franz remembers his past live at the age of 6 while he was acting villainous. While growing up, he's trying to avoid the path of a villain to avoid his death.

== Media ==
=== Light novel ===
Written by Uma no Koe ga Kikoeru, Akuyaku no Goreisoku no Dōnika Shitai Nichijō initially began serialization on the Moonlight Novels female adult section of the user-generated novel publishing website Shōsetsuka ni Narō on January 2, 2020. It was later acquired by Ichijinsha who began publishing it with illustrations by Kōki. under its Ichijinsha Novels light novel imprint on June 2, 2021. Six volumes and a side story collection have been released as of March 4, 2025.

| No. | Release date | ISBN |
|---|---|---|
| 1 | June 2, 2021 | 978-4-7580-9371-2 |
| 2 | February 2, 2022 | 978-4-7580-9438-2 |
| 3 | December 28, 2022 | 978-4-7580-9518-1 |
| 4 | November 2, 2023 | 978-4-7580-9594-5 |
| 5 | June 4, 2024 | 978-4-7580-9648-5 |
| 5.5 | July 2, 2024 | 978-4-7580-9656-0 |
| 6 | March 4, 2025 | 978-4-7580-9711-6 |

=== Manga ===
A manga adaptation illustrated by Nimu Fuwai began serialization on Ichijinsha's Zero Sum Online manga website on February 4, 2022. The manga's chapters have been collected into eight tankōbon volumes as of September 2026.

| No. | Release date | ISBN |
|---|---|---|
| 1 | August 31, 2022 | 978-4-7580-3781-5 |
| 2 | February 28, 2023 | 978-4-7580-3862-1 |
| 3 | October 31, 2023 | 978-4-7580-3949-9 |
| 4 | May 28, 2024 | 978-4-7580-8523-6 |
| 5 | December 26, 2024 | 978-4-7580-8635-6 |
| 6 | July 31, 2025 | 978-4-7580-8767-4 |
| 7 | February 28, 2026 | 978-4-7580-8972-2 |
| 8 | September 30, 2026 | 978-4-8251-0145-6 |
