= Royal Spirits Are a Royal Pain! Give Me a Regular Romance =

Japanese light novel series

- First light novel volume cover

転生令嬢は精霊に愛されて最強です……だけど普通に恋したい! (Tensei Reijō wa Seirei ni Aisarete Saikyō Desu...... Dakedo Futsū ni Koi Shitai!)
- Genre: Isekai, romantic fantasy
- Novel series
- Written by: Rei Kazama
- Published by: Shōsetsuka ni Narō
- Original run: April 30, 2019 – March 26, 2022
- Light novel
- Written by: Rei Kazama
- Illustrated by: Fujiazuki
- Published by: TO Books
- English publisher: NA: J-Novel Club
- Imprint: TO Bunko
- Original run: March 10, 2020 – February 1, 2026
- Volumes: 13
- Manga
- Written by: Rei Kazama
- Illustrated by: Hana
- Published by: TO Books
- Imprint: Corona Comics
- Magazine: Comic Corona
- Original run: May 31, 2021 – present
- Volumes: 6

Royal Spirits Are a Royal Pain! Give Me a Regular Romance (転生令嬢は精霊に愛されて最強です……だけど普通に恋したい!, Tensei Reijō wa Seirei ni Aisarete Saikyō Desu...... Dakedo Futsū ni Koi Shitai) is a Japanese light novel series written by Rei Kazama and illustrated by Fujiazuki. It was initially serialized on Shōsetsuka ni Narō from April 2019 to March 2022. It was later acquired by TO Books who published it under their TO Bunko imprint from March 2020 to February 2026. A manga adaptation illustrated by Hana began serialization on the Nico Nico Seiga website under TO Books' Comic Corona brand in May 2021.

== Synopsis ==
After dying at a young age in her previous life, Deirdre Abel von Belisario is determined to a live a long life with romance. Unfortunately for her, she catches the eyes of the Royal Spirits of her land, and getting involved with these spirits strays her from reaching her desired path.

== Media ==
=== Light novels ===
Written by Rei Kazama, Royal Spirits Are a Royal Pain! Give Me a Regular Romance was initially serialized on Shōsetsuka ni Narō from April 30, 2019, to March 26, 2022. It was later acquired by TO Books who published thirteen volumes with illustrations by Fujiazuki under their TO Bunko light novel imprint from March 10, 2020, to February 1, 2026.

During their panel at Anime NYC 2025, J-Novel Club announced that they had licensed the series for English publication.

No.	Original release date	Original ISBN	North American release date	North American ISBN
1	March 10, 2020	978-4-86472-939-0	November 12, 2025	978-1-71837-762-2
1. Prologue; 2. "A Boring Baby Life"; 3. "An OP Skill and Radio Calisthenics"; 4. "A Wild Child Who Triggers Everyone's Protective Instinct"; 5. "Genius and Folly Are Two Sides of the Same Coin"; 6. "The First Family Meeting"; 7. "Birthday Party"; 8. "A Close Encounter with the Imperial Party"; 9. "My Brothers Are Mega Cheat Codes"; 10. "The Reason for My Reincarnation"; 11. "A Spiritless Forest"; 12. "Fairy Co."; 13. Epilogue; Extra: "Chris: A Secret Wise Woman?"; Extra: "Alan: The Hero's Grandson"
2	June 10, 2020	978-4-86699-007-1	February 11, 2026	978-1-71837-764-6
1. Prologue; 2. "Hawaiians"; 3. "The March of Noland"; 4. "Girl Talk"; 5. "A Brewing Conflict"; 6. "An Enjoyable Meal, Kolkett Edition"; 7. "Hisui's Abode"; 8. "The Interview with Kohaku in the Capital"; 9. "A Hidden Truth"; 10. "Undelivered Invitations"; 11. "The Secret Gathering"; 12. "Feeling Like a Detective"; 13. "The Tea Party Takes Effect"; 14. "The Ruler's Seat"; 15. Epilogue; Extra: "Irene: A Turning Point"; Extra: "The New Chancellor: A Pain in the Stomach"; Extra: "Andrew: A Secret He Would Never Tell"
3	September 19, 2020	978-4-86699-050-7	May 20, 2026	978-1-71837-766-0
1. "Ten at Last"; 2. "A Staple of Isekai Reincarnation"; 3. "A Deal of Lies and Bluffs"; 4. "The Land of the Spirits"; 5. "The Luftanese Royal Spirits"; 6. "Get to Work!"; 7. "My Friends Are Mega Popular"; 8. "Cacao Duty"; 9. "The Beginning of Dorm Life"; 10. "Opening Ceremony"; 11. "School Tour"; 12. "Even Between Close Friends"; 13. "Impossible to Keep Quiet"; 14. "Hair Color and Narcissism"; 15. "Impending War?"; Extra: "Kamil: In the Land Loved by the Spirits"; Side story: "A Winter Test of Courage"
4	December 19, 2020	978-4-86699-090-3	September 2, 2026	978-1-71837-768-4
1. "House Johannes"; 2. "Discord in the Imperial Family"; 3. "Lunching Like a Student?"; 4. "A Precious Friend"; 5. "Women Are Strong!"; 6. "Courtship Presentation"; 7. "Changing Relationships"; 8. "Mother and Daughter"; 9. "End of the First Term"; 10. "Even Deir Is a Lady"; 11. "Victims of Gossip?"; 12. "The First Prototype"; 13. "Dance Lessons"; 14. "Summit of the Royal Spirits"; 15. "Doujin Soul"; 16. "Let's Celebrate the New Adults"; 17. "First Dance"; 18. "A Comrade Spotted!"; 19. "Her Influence Is Too Powerful!"; 20. "High Risk, High Return"; 21. "The Imperial Guard's Public Drill"; 22. "The Arrival of March"; Extra: "Kamil: The Fairy Princess's Brothers"; Extra: "Monica: A Place One Can Be at Ease"
5	March 19, 2021	978-4-86699-176-4	November 12, 2026	978-1-71837-770-7
1. Prologue; 2. "Off to Luftanen!"; 3. "Something's Fishy"; 4. "A Known Secret"; 5. "Too Far Again?"; 6. "Unobtrusively Obtrusive"; 7. "To Take Another Step Forward"; 8. Epilogue; Extra: "Chris: More Than Just a Sister-Lover"; Extra: "Kamil: A Special Girl"
6	September 18, 2021	978-4-86699-331-7	February 3, 2027	978-1-71837-772-1
7	June 20, 2022	978-4-86699-537-3	—	—
8	September 20, 2022	978-4-86699-668-4	—	—
9	April 20, 2023	978-4-86699-829-9	—	—
10	October 10, 2023	978-4-86699-966-1	—	—
11	May 20, 2024	978-4-86794-188-1	—	—
12	July 15, 2025	978-4-86794-631-2	—	—
13	February 1, 2026	978-4-86794-854-5	—	—

=== Manga ===
A manga adaptation illustrated by Hana began serialization on the Nico Nico Seiga website under TO Books' Comic Corona brand on May 31, 2021. The manga's chapters have been compiled into six tankōbon volumes as of February 2026.

No.	Release date	ISBN
1	October 1, 2021	978-4-86699-340-9
2	April 1, 2022	978-4-86699-493-2
3	December 15, 2022	978-4-86699-723-0
4	October 14, 2023	978-4-86699-972-2
5	September 14, 2024	978-4-86794-309-0
6	February 1, 2026	978-4-86794-849-1

== Reception ==
By February 2026, the series had over 500,000 copies in circulation.
