= Lazy Dungeon Master =

Japanese light novel series

- First light novel volume cover

絶対に働きたくないダンジョンマスターが惰眠をむさぼるまで (Zettai ni Hatarakitakunai Danjon Masutā ga Damin o Musaboru Made)
- Genre: Isekai, comedy, harem
- Novel series
- Written by: Supana Onikage
- Published by: Shōsetsuka ni Narō
- Original run: April 29, 2015 – present
- Light novel
- Written by: Supana Onikage
- Illustrated by: Youta
- Published by: Overlap
- English publisher: NA: J-Novel Club
- Imprint: Overlap Bunko
- Original run: April 25, 2016 – June 25, 2022
- Volumes: 17
- Manga
- Written by: Supana Onikage
- Illustrated by: Nanaroku
- Published by: Overlap
- English publisher: NA: Seven Seas Entertainment
- Imprint: Gardo Comics
- Magazine: Comic Gardo
- Original run: July 26, 2018 – present
- Volumes: 14

Lazy Dungeon Master (絶対に働きたくないダンジョンマスターが惰眠をむさぼるまで, Zettai ni Hatarakitakunai Danjon Masutā ga Damin o Musaboru Made) is a Japanese light novel series written by Supana Onikage and illustrated by Youta. It began serialization online in April 2015 on the user-generated novel publishing website Shōsetsuka ni Narō. It was acquired by Overlap, who published the first light novel volume in April 2016 under their Overlap Bunko imprint. A manga adaptation with art by Nanaroku has been serialized online via Overlap's Comic Gardo website since July 2018. The light novel is licensed in North America by J-Novel Club, and the manga is licensed by Seven Seas Entertainment.

== Media ==
=== Light novels ===
The light novel was originally published by Supana Onikage as a free-to-read web novel on Shōsetsuka ni Narō in April 2015 and Overlap published the first volume in print with illustrations by Youta in April 2016. The seventeenth and last volume was published in June 2022. The light novel is licensed in North America by J-Novel Club. As of December 2022, all seventeen volumes have been published in English.

No.	Original release date	Original ISBN	English release date	English ISBN
1	April 25, 2016	978-4-86554-118-2	August 5, 2018	978-1-71-832400-8
2	July 25, 2016	978-4-86554-141-0	October 10, 2018	978-1-71-832402-2
3	November 25, 2016	978-4-86554-172-4	December 11, 2018	978-1-71-832404-6
4	February 25, 2017	978-4-86554-195-3	February 12, 2019	978-1-71-832406-0
5	June 25, 2017	978-4-86554-231-8	May 5, 2019	978-1-71-832408-4
6	November 25, 2017	978-4-86554-284-4	July 23, 2019	978-1-71-832410-7
7	March 25, 2018	978-4-86554-325-4	October 1, 2019	978-1-71-832412-1
8	July 25, 2018	978-4-86554-377-3	December 17, 2019	978-1-71-832414-5
9	November 25, 2018	978-4-86554-417-6	February 25, 2020	978-1-71-832416-9
10	March 25, 2019	978-4-86554-465-7	May 5, 2020	978-1-71-832418-3
11	August 25, 2019	978-4-86554-535-7	July 15, 2020	978-1-71-832420-6
12	January 25, 2020	978-4-86554-600-2	September 23, 2020	978-1-71-832422-0
13	June 25, 2020	978-4-86554-679-8	December 8, 2020	978-1-71-832424-4
14	November 25, 2020	978-4-86554-783-2	May 14, 2021	978-1-71-832426-8
15	May 25, 2021	978-4-86554-911-9	December 6, 2021	978-1-71-832428-2
16	November 25, 2021	978-4-8240-0045-3	May 26, 2022	978-1-71-832430-5
17	June 25, 2022	978-4-8240-0212-9	December 28, 2022	978-1-71-832432-9

=== Manga ===
A manga adaptation illustrated by Nanaroku began serialization on Overlap's Comic Gardo on July 26, 2018. As of November 2026, fourteen tankōbon volumes have been released. The manga is licensed by Seven Seas Entertainment. As of March 17, 2026, twelve English volumes have been published.

No.	Original release date	Original ISBN	English release date	English ISBN
1	March 25, 2019	978-4-86554-467-1	September 27, 2022	978-1-63858-586-2
2	August 25, 2019	978-4-86554-538-8	January 3, 2023	978-1-63858-750-7
3	February 25, 2020	978-4-86554-618-7	March 21, 2023	978-1-63858-864-1
4	November 25, 2020	978-4-86554-793-1	May 23, 2023	978-1-68579-546-7
5	April 25, 2021	978-4-86554-896-9	August 8, 2023	978-1-68579-849-9
6	November 25, 2021	978-4-8240-0053-8	November 14, 2023	978-1-68579-850-5
7	June 25, 2022	978-4-8240-0221-1	February 27, 2024	979-8-88843-363-8
8	January 25, 2023	978-4-8240-0401-7	May 21, 2024	979-8-88843-594-6
9	August 25, 2023	978-4-8240-0595-3	September 24, 2024	979-8-89160-187-1
10	March 25, 2024	978-4-8240-0778-0	February 4, 2025	979-8-89160-641-8
11	October 25, 2024	978-4-8240-0981-4	June 24, 2025	979-8-89373-318-1
12	July 25, 2025	978-4-8240-1278-4	March 17, 2026	979-8-89765-344-7
13	March 25, 2026	978-4-8240-1582-2	March 23, 2027	979-8-89863-197-0
14	November 20, 2026	978-4-8240-1950-9	—	—
