= Shōsetsuka ni Narō =

Japanese novel publishing website

- Website type: Novel posting website
- Available in: Japanese
- Country of origin: Japan
- Owner: Hina Project
- Creator: Yusuke Umezaki
- Website: syosetu.com
- Commercial: Yes
- Registration: Required for posting only
- Users: 2.3 million (2026)
- Launched: April 2, 2004; 22 years ago
- Current status: Online

Shōsetsuka ni Narō (小説家になろう; lit. 'Let's Become a Novelist') is a Japanese web novel publishing website created by Yusuke Umezaki. The website allows writers to upload their novels that can be read free of charge. Around 1.14 million novels have been published on the website as of the end of 2025. The website's works are primarily young adult literature and centered around the isekai genre; in particular, a large number of stories share similar settings and themes.

Umezaki began developing the website in October 2003 and launched it in April 2004, with the website growing in popularity due to the cell phone novel boom and the print publications of The Irregular at Magic High School and Log Horizon in 2011. Umezaki co-founded Hina Project to run the website in 2010. The website's writers tend to be amateur writers with little formal training. Well-performing works are acquired for print publication as a light novel and sometimes receive manga or anime adaptations.

The website is one of the most popular entertainment websites in Japan, with 2.3 million registered users as of January 2026; several publishers have tried to launch similar websites. It has been described as "the primary source of new IP for the light novel industry" and several of the most successful light novels, such as That Time I Got Reincarnated as a Slime, originated on the website. More than 200 novels published on the website have received an anime adaptation. The website also helped establish the isekai genre as its own category.

== History ==
Yusuke Umezaki began developing the website in October 2003, while in his third year in high school, and launched the website on April 2, 2004. Umezaki promoted the website on various internet forums, and, by 2008, the website had become too large for Umezaki to run by himself, so he asked friends from university to help. They founded the company Hina Project to operate the website in March 2010. The website's growth in popularity was linked to the cell phone novel boom and the print publication of The Irregular at Magic High School and Log Horizon in 2011.

Hina Project later launched Nocturne Novels and Midnight Novels as sister websites to Shōsetsuka ni Narō to publish novels for men with mature themes. Alongside Frontier Works, the website published the web magazine N-Star in 2017. In 2023, Hina Project launched Onaco, a website for posting adult illustrations that only accepts payments from bank transfers to circumvent financial censorship. Umezaki resigned from his position as representative director of Hina Project in 2024.

== Characteristics ==
Works published on Shōsetsuka ni Narō are primarily young adult literature. When Shōsetsuka ni Narō was launched, fan fiction stories were often posted. However, Hina Project split off fan fiction into another site, called NijiFan, in 2010, before shutting it down in 2012, thus banning the posting of fan fiction. As a result, writers began posting novels that were similar to established works, while still being distinct enough to avoid being considered a fan fiction. Most authors on Shōsetsuka ni Narō are amateur writers and lack formal creative writing training; many also hold regular day jobs. For instance, Tappei Nagatsuki worked as a butcher while writing on the website. On the website's writers, Rifujin na Magonote, who has written on the website extensively, said "I didn't want to be compared to that level. I thought it would be lowering myself".

In a study using 600 works from the website, researchers found that the more popular works on the website use empathy for the protagonist in the beginning of the story, while novels that evoked surprise or fear were less popular. The study found that the middle of the stories tended to develop trust between the protagonist and their companions to prepare for challenges to come in the later parts of the story, with anticipation and trust remaining central themes throughout. The study concluded by suggesting that strengthening trust between the characters forms the foundation for the story and promotes emotional immersion from the reader.

While not all works on Shōsetsuka ni Narō are isekai stories, the website's stories are broadly centered around the genre. Takayuki Ohashi of Shūkan Gendai wrote that "almost no one reads anything that isn't an isekai story". These works do not attempt to depict a unique world or characters, but instead try to focus on having a creative interpretation of the standard set-up to make them feel fresh. The stories usually begin without much explanation of the new world, while the protagonist starts with a "hero" status. The later parts of the story revolve around the protagonist figuring out the new world; the stories usually lack a clear goal for the protagonist. The stories can contain LitRPG elements. Since many works share the same template, readers are able to know broadly what to expect, which has contributed to this theme's popularity. If a reader tires of a work, they can start reading a new work, which the website's interface is designed to facilitate. This has been described as an example of database consumption. These types of stories have become known as "narō-kei".

For female readers, many of which were inherited from the cell phone novel boom, romantic drama stories in a dating sim or otome game setting have become popular. In these stories, the protagonist, often an ordinary girl, is presented with a marriage proposal, while the story is narrated by a non-player character, often a villainess, with the story focusing on how they escape their downfall.

Many works published on the website have long titles. J-Novel Club CEO Samuel Pinarsky felt that this is caused by the website listing chapters by title only, so writers felt that a more descriptive title would attract readers. On June 5, 2025, the website banned works generated entirely by artificial intelligence (AI) and began requiring disclosure for works that use AI assistance.

=== Media franchise ===
Works that perform well on Shōsetsuka ni Narō are published in print as a light novel by one of the major publishers, such as Futabasha, which established the Monster Bunko imprint to publish works from the website. When this happens, the writer is assigned an editor to refine the prose, while a professional illustrator creates drawings to serve as its visual identity. The print version may also expand on the web novel. Less than 0.1% of the website's catalog is published in print. If the print version sells well, then a manga adaptation follows. An anime adaptation is the apex of the process. Some works also receive a film adaptation.

While Shōsetsuka ni Narō does not itself run novel contests, several publishers sponsor contests on the website. The winner of the grand prize is granted a publication deal, while the remuneration for the contests are usually tantamount to traditional literary awards.

== Features ==
Registered users can write or edit their work through the website's own editor or post them directly by uploading text files or sending them through email. The system also allows writers to add tags to their work for accessibility and to make their own user page where they can post updates and receive feedback from readers. Because of these blog-like features, the website has been described as a de facto social media service. Readers can bookmark works to receive notifications when new chapters are released. The website also has a ranking system, where the works with the most bookmarks and best ratings are shown, which encourages competition.

The website also allows users to leave comments on works and to rate them on a scale of one to five. The comments section is divided into three categories: one for praise, one for pointing out small corrections, and one for larger thoughts about the story. All works on the website are free to read. The website's revenue comes from running advertisements and partnerships with publishing companies. The website's data has been scraped by an AI developer.

== Impact ==
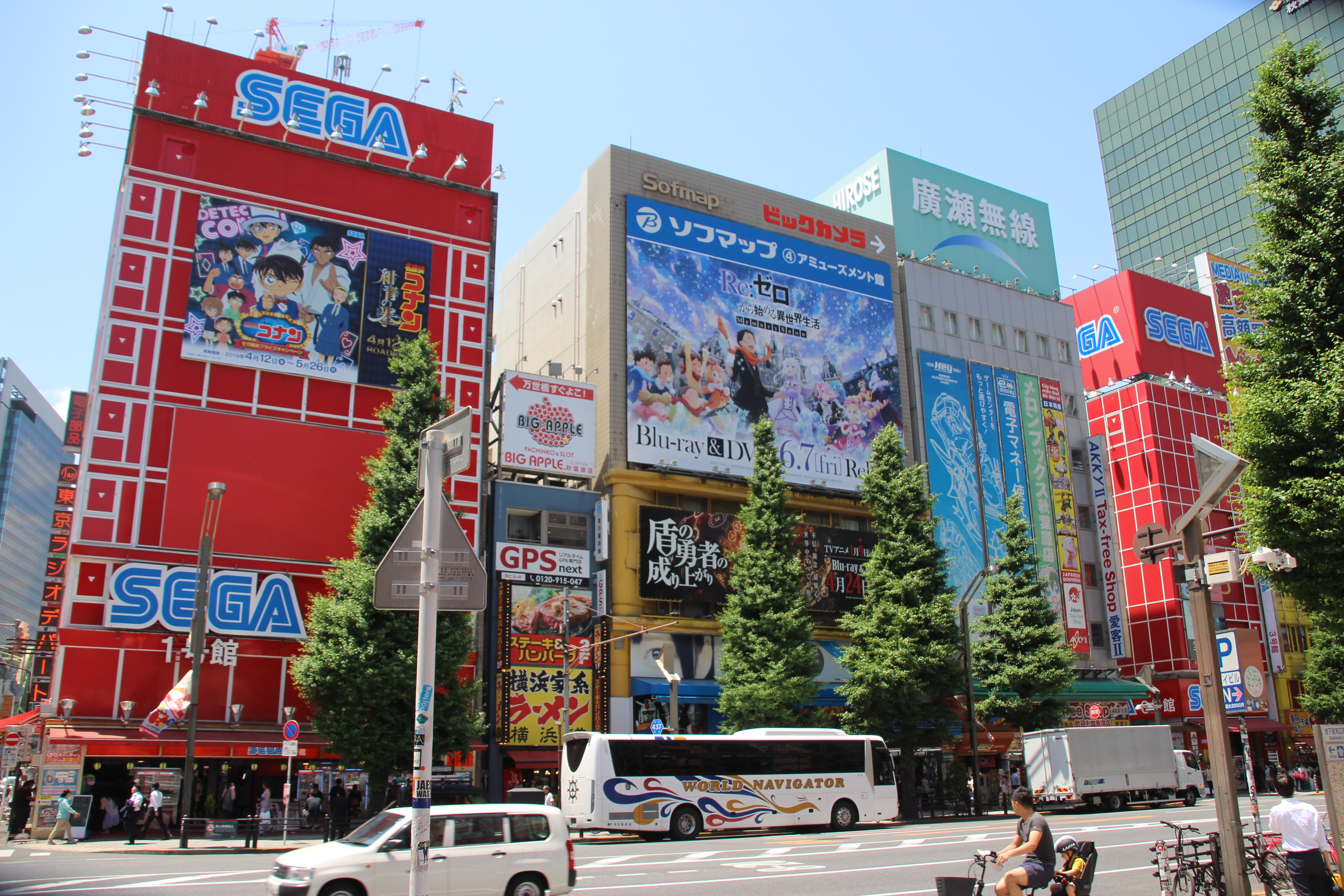
Advertisements for the anime adaptations of Re:Zero and The Rising of the Shield Hero in Akihabara in 2019. Both originated as web novels on Shōsetsuka ni Narō.

Shōsetsuka ni Narō has 2.3 million registered users as of January 2026 receives more than 1 billion page views per month. About 1.14 million novels have been published on the platform as of the end of 2025. According to Similarweb, the website is the third most popular arts and entertainment website in Japan, behind YouTube and Pixiv and ahead of Facebook and Instagram. Following the website's success, several major publishers have tried to launch their own novel publishing websites, including Gengoya by Shinchosha, Monogatary.com by Sony Music Entertainment Japan, Novel Days by Kodansha, and Novel Up Plus by Hobby Japan, with Kakuyomu by Kadokawa and Hatena being the most successful.

Jerome Mazandarani of Anime News Network wrote that "the website serves as the primary source of new IP for the light novel industry". Several of the most successful light novels were initially published on the website, including That Time I Got Reincarnated as a Slime, Ascendance of a Bookworm, The Rising of the Shield Hero, and The Apothecary Diaries. The website's most successful works have become commercially successful media franchises. More than 200 novels published on the website have been adapted into anime.

The website has also helped to popularize the isekai genre and is credited with establishing the isekai genre as its own category. In 2025, between eight and ten isekai anime were released every season; 70-85% of those were based on novels that originated on the website.

== Selected works ==
Below is a list of noteworthy works published on the website:

- 7th Time Loop (2020–ongoing) by Touko Amekawa—acquired by Overlap, received a manga adaptation and an anime television series adaptation
- A Gentle Noble's Vacation Recommendation (2014–present) by Misaki—acquired by TO Books, received a manga adaptation, two stage play adaptations, and an anime television series adaptation
- A Herbivorous Dragon of 5,000 Years Gets Unfairly Villainized (2017–2020) by Kaisei Enomoto—acquired by Kadokawa Shoten, received a manga adaptation and an original net animation adaptation
- A Livid Lady's Guide to Getting Even (2020–ongoing) by Metabo Hagure—acquired by Hobby Japan, received a manga adaptation and an anime adaptation
- A Nobody's Way Up to an Exploration Hero (2019–ongoing) by Kaitō—acquired by Hobby Japan, received a manga adaptation and an anime television series adaptation
- A Playthrough of a Certain Dude's VRMMO Life (2013–2016, moved to AlphaPolis) by Shiina Howahowa—acquired by AlphaPolis, received a manga adaptation and an anime television series adaptation
- A Tale of the Secret Saint (2019–present) by Touya—acquired by Earth Star Entertainment, received a manga adaptation and an anime television series adaptation
- A Wild Last Boss Appeared! (2015–2019) by Firehead—acquired by Earth Star Entertainment, received a manga adaptation and an anime television series adaptation
- Accomplishments of the Duke's Daughter (2015–2017) by Reia—acquired by Fujimi Shobo, received a manga adaptation
- Akuyaku no Goreisoku no Dōnika Shitai Nichijō (2020–present) by Uma no Koe ga Kikoeru—acquired by Ichijinsha, received a manga adaptation
- Almark (2019–ongoing) by Noboru Yamada—acquired by Media Factory, received a manga adaptation
- Alya Sometimes Hides Her Feelings in Russian (2020) by SunSunSun—acquired by Kadokawa Shoten, received a manga adaptation and an anime television series adaptation
- Arasa ga VTuber ni Natta Hanashi (2020–ongoing, also on Hameln and Kakuyomu) by Tokumei—acquired by Enterbrain, received a manga adaptation
- Am I Actually the Strongest? (2018–ongoing) by Sai Sumimori—acquired by Kodansha, received a manga adaptation and an anime television series adaptation
- An Introvert's Hookup Hiccups (2020–2021, also on Novel Up Plus) by Yuishi—acquired by Hobby Japan, received a manga adaptation
- An Observation Log of My Fiancée Who Calls Herself a Villainess (2016–2017, moved to AlphaPolis) by Shiki—acquired by AlphaPolis, received a manga adaptation
- Apocalypse Bringer Mynoghra (2017–ongoing) by Fefu Kazuno—cquired by Micro Magazine, received a manga adaptation and an anime television series adaptation
- Apparently, Disillusioned Adventurers Will Save the World (2019–ongoing) by Shinta Fuji—acquired by Media Factory, received a manga adaptation and an anime television series adaptation
- Arifureta: From Commonplace to World's Strongest (2013–ongoing) by Ryo Shirakome—acquired by Overlap, received several manga adaptations, a prequel light novel series, and an anime television series adaptation
- As a Reincarnated Aristocrat, I'll Use My Appraisal Skill to Rise in the World (2019–ongoing) by Miraijin A—acquired by Kodansha, received a manga adaptation and an anime television series adaptation
- Ascendance of a Bookworm (2013–2017) by Miya Kazuki—acquired by TO Books, received several manga adaptations and an anime television series adaptation
- Backstabbed in a Backwater Dungeon (2020–ongoing) by Shisui Meikyō—acquired by Hobby Japan, received a manga adaptation and an anime television series adaptation
- Banished from the Hero's Party (2017–ongoing) by Zappon—acquired by Kadokawa Shoten, received a manga adaptation and an anime television series adaptation
- Beast Tamer (2018–ongoing) by Suzu Miyama—acquired by Kodansha, received a manga adaptation and an anime television series adaptation
- Berserk of Gluttony (2017–2022, moved to Kakuyomu) by Ichika Isshiki—acquired by Micro Magazine, received a manga adaptation and an anime television series adaptation
- Betrothed to My Sister's Ex (2019–ongoing) by Tobirano—acquired by Futabasha, received a manga adaptation and an anime television series adaptation
- Bibliophile Princess (2015–2022) by Yui—acquired by Ichijinsha, received a manga adaptation and an anime television series adaptation
- Bogus Skill "Fruitmaster" (2020–present) by Hanyuu - acquired by Kodansha, received a manga adaptation and an anime television series adaptation
- Black Summoner (2014–ongoing) by Doufu Mayoi - acquired by Overlap, received a manga adaptation and an anime television series adaptation
- Bofuri (2016–ongoing) by Yuumikan - acquired by Fujimi Shobo, received a manga adaptation and an anime television series adaptation
- By the Grace of the Gods (2014–ongoing) by Roy - acquired by Hobby Japan, received a manga adaptation and an anime television series adaptation
- Campfire Cooking in Another World with My Absurd Skill (2016–ongoing) by Ren Eguchi - acquired by Overlap, received a manga adaptation, a spin-off manga, and an anime television series adaptation
- Chillin' in Another World with Level 2 Super Cheat Powers (2016–2019) by Miya Kinojo - acquired by Overlap, received a manga adaptation and an anime television series adaptation
- Chillin' in My 30s After Getting Fired from the Demon King's Army (2018–2020) by Rokujūyon Okazawa - acquired by Kodansha, received a manga adaptation and an anime television series adaptation
- Chronicles of an Aristocrat Reborn in Another World (2016–ongoing) by Yashu - acquired by Hifumi Shobō, received a manga adaptation and an anime television series adaptation
- Combatants Will Be Dispatched! (2012) by Natsume Akatsuki - acquired by Kadokawa Shoten, received a manga adaptation and an anime television series adaptation
- Cooking with Wild Game (2014–ongoing) by EDA - acquired by Hobby Japan, received a manga adaptation
- Cross-Dressing Villainess Cecilia Sylvie (2019–2022) by Hiroro Akizakura- acquired by Kadokawa Shoten, received a manga adaptation
- D-Genesis: Three Years after the Dungeons Appeared (2016–present) by Tsuranori Kono - acquired by Enterbrain, received a manga adaptation
- Dahlia in Bloom (2018–ongoing) by Hisaya Amagishi - acquired by Media Factory, received two manga adaptations and an anime television series adaptation
- Death March to the Parallel World Rhapsody (2013–ongoing) by Hiro Ainana - acquired by Fujimi Shobo, received a manga adaptation and an anime television series adaptation
- Demon Lord, Retry! (2016–ongoing) by Kurone Kanzaki - acquired by Futabasha, received a manga adaptation and an anime television series adaptation
- Der Werwolf: The Annals of Veight (2015–2017) by Hyougetsu - acquired by Earth Star Entertainment and Square Enix, received a manga adaptation
- Didn't I Say to Make My Abilities Average in the Next Life?! (2016–ongoing) by FUNA - acquired by Earth Star Entertainment and Square Enix, received a manga adaptation and an anime television series adaptation
- Dimension Wave (2012–ongoing) by Aneko Yusagi - acquired by Shufunotomo, received a manga adaptation
- Dinners with My Darling: How the Former Monster King Ate Her Way to Happiness (2022–2023) by Mugi Mameta - acquired by Futabasha, received a manga adaptation
- Drugstore in Another World (2016–2020) by Kennoji - acquired by Linda Publishers (formerly) and Hifumi Shobō, received a manga adaptation and an anime television series adaptation
- Duchess in the Attic (2017–2019) by Mori - acquired by Fujimi Shobo, received a manga adaptation
- Dungeon Kurashi no Moto Yūsha (2015–present) by Ryūnosuke Minesaki - acquired by Kill Time Communication, received a manga adaptation
- Easygoing Territory Defense by the Optimistic Lord (2020–ongoing) by Sou Akaike - acquired by Overlap, received a manga adaptation and an anime television series adaptation
- Einen Koyō wa Kanō Deshō ka (2021–2023) by yokuu - acquired by Media Factory, received a manga adaptation
- Endo and Kobayashi Live! The Latest on Tsundere Villainess Lieselotte (2018, also on Kakuyomu) by Suzu Enoshima - acquired by Fujimi Shobo, received a manga adaptation and an anime television series adaptation
- Even Given the Worthless "Appraiser" Class, I'm Actually the Strongest (2019–2022) by Ibarakino - acquired by Kodansha, received a manga adaptation and an anime television series adaptation
- Even Though I'm a Super Timid Noble Girl, I Accepted the Bet from My Cunning Fiancé (2020) by Hiro Oda - acquired by Enterbrain, received a manga adaptation and an anime television series adaptation
- Failure Frame (2017–ongoing) by Kaoru Shinozaki - acquired by Overlap, received a manga adaptation and an anime television series adaptation
- Farming Life in Another World (2016–ongoing) by Kinosuke Naito - acquired by Enterbrain, received a manga adaptation and an anime television series adaptation
- Fluffy Paradise (2012–ongoing) by Himawari - acquired by Futabasha, received a manga adaptation and an anime television series adaptation
- From Old Country Bumpkin to Master Swordsman (2020-ongoing) by Shigeru Sagazaki - acquired by Square Enix, received a manga adaptation and an anime television series adaptation
- Fukushū o Koinegau Saikyō Yūsha wa (2018) by Manimani Ononata - acquired by Shueisha, received a manga adaptation
- Full Clearing Another World under a Goddess with Zero Believers (2018–ongoing) by Isle Ōsaki - acquired by Overlap, received a manga adaptation
- Gacha Girls Corps (2016–ongoing) by Chinkururi - acquired by Micro Magazine, received a manga adaptation and anime adaptation
- Goodbye, Dragon Life (2013–2016, moved to AlphaPolis) by Hiroaki Nagashima - acquired by AlphaPolis, received a manga adaptation and an anime television series adaptation
- Harem in the Labyrinth of Another World (2011–2019) by Shachi Sogano - acquired by Shufunotomo, received a manga adaptation and an anime television series adaptation
- Hazure Skill (2018–ongoing) by Kennoji - acquired by Fujimi Shobo, received a manga adaptation
- Head Start at Birth (2019–2021) by Umika - acquired by Shusuisha, received a manga adaptation and an anime television series adaptation
- Hell Mode: The Hardcore Gamer Dominates in Another World with Garbage Balancing (2019–present) by Hamuo - acquired by Earth Star Entertainment, received a manga adaptation and an anime television series adaptation
- Hero Without a Class: Who Even Needs Skills?! (2017–2020) by Shichio Kuzu - acquired by Earth Star Entertainment, received a manga adaptation and an anime television series adaptation
- Heroine? Saint? No, I'm an All-Works Maid (and Proud of It)! (2017–ongoing, also on Kakuyomu) by Atekichi - acquired by TO Books, received a manga adaptation and an anime television series adaptation
- Himekishi ga Classmate! Isekai Cheat de Dorei-ka Harem (2014–2016) by EKZ - acquired by Kill Time Communication, received a manga adaptation
- History of the Kingdom of the Orcsen: How the Barbarian Orcish Nation Came to Burn Down the Peaceful Elfland (2021–ongoing) by Kyōichirō Tarumi - acquired by Hifumi Shobo, received a manga adaptation
- How a Realist Hero Rebuilt the Kingdom (2014–2016, moved to Pixiv) by Dojyomaru - acquired by Overlap, received a manga adaptation and an anime television series adaptation
- I Became a Legend After My 10 Year-Long Last Stand (2018–2021) by Ezogingitune - acquired by SB Creative, received a manga adaptation and an anime television series adaptation
- I Got Caught Up in a Hero Summons, but the Other World Was at Peace! (2016–ongoing) by Toudai - acquired by Shinkigensha, received a manga adaptation
- I Kept Pressing the 100-Million Button and Came Out on Top (2019–ongoing) by Shuichi Tsukishima - acquired by Fujimi Shobo, received a manga adaptation
- I Left My A-Rank Party to Help My Former Students Reach the Dungeon Depths! (2020–2023) by Kōsuke Unagi - acquired by Kodansha, received a manga adaptation and an anime television series adaptation
- I Lost My Adventurer's License, but It's Fine Because I Have an Adorable Daughter Now by Manimani Ononata - acquired by SB Creative, received a manga adaptation
- I Parry Everything: What Do You Mean I'm the Strongest? I'm Not Even an Adventurer Yet! (2019–ongoing) by Nabeshiki - acquired by Earth Star Entertainment, received a manga adaptation and an anime television series adaptation
- I Saved Myself with a Potion!: Life in Another World (2014–2024) by Akira Iwafune - acquired by Shufunotomo, received a manga adaptation and an anime television series adaptation
- I Shall Survive Using Potions! (2015–ongoing) by FUNA - acquired by Kodansha, received two manga adaptations, a spin-off manga, and an anime television series adaptation
- I Want to Eat Your Pancreas (2014) by Yoru Sumino - acquired by Futabasha, received a manga adaptation, a live-action film adaptation, and an anime film adaptation
- I Want to Escape from Princess Lessons (2018–2019) by Izumi Sawano - acquired by Shufu to Seikatsu Sha, received a manga adaptation and an anime television series adaptation
- I Was Exiled as a Villainess! I Am Now a Sister Living the Good Life Through a Culinary Reform (2018–2020) by Tail Yuzuhara - acquired by ASCII Media Works, received a manga adaptation and an anime adaptation
- I Was Reincarnated as the Villainess in an Otome Game, but the Boys Love Me Anyway! (2018–ongoing) by Sō Inaida - acquired by TO Books, received a manga adaptation and a stage play adaptation
- I Was Reincarnated as the 7th Prince so I Can Take My Time Perfecting My Magical Ability (2019–ongoing) by Kenkyo na Circle - acquired by Kodansha, received a manga adaptation and an anime television series adaptation
- I'll Become a Villainess Who Goes Down in History (2018–ongoing) by Izumi Okido - acquired by Enterbrain, received a manga adaptation and an anime television series adaptation
- I'll Never Set Foot in That House Again! (2019–present) by Milligram - acquired by Overlap, received a manga adaptation
- I'm a Behemoth, an S-Ranked Monster, but Mistaken for a Cat, I Live as an Elf Girl's Pet (2017–ongoing) by Nozomi Ginyoku - acquired by Micro Magazine, received a manga adaptation and an anime television series adaptation
- I'm a Curse Crafter, and I Don't Need an S-Rank Party! (2021-ongoing, also on Kakuyomu) by LAgun - acquired by Hobby Japan, received a manga adaptation and an anime television series adaptation
- I'm a Noble on the Brink of Ruin, So I Might as Well Try Mastering Magic (2019–present) by Nazuna Miki - acquired by TO Books, received a manga adaptation, a spin-off manga, and an anime television series adaptation
- I'm Giving the Disgraced Noble Lady I Rescued a Crash Course in Naughtiness (2019–ongoing) by Sametaro Fukada - acquired by Shufu to Seikatsu Sha, received a manga adaptation and an anime television series adaptation
- I'm in Love with the Villainess (2018–2021) by Inori - acquired by Aichu Publishing and Ichijinsha, received a manga adaptation and an anime television series adaptation
- I'm the Evil Lord of an Intergalactic Empire! (2018–ongoing) by Yomu Mishima - acquired by Overlap, received a manga adaptation, a spin-off light novel series and an anime television series adaptation
- I'm the Villainess, So I'm Taming the Final Boss (2017–2019) by Sarasa Nagase - acquired by Kadokawa Shoten, received a manga adaptation and an anime television series adaptation
- I've Been Killing Slimes for 300 Years and Maxed Out My Level (2016–2021) by Kisetsu Morita - acquired by SB Creative, received a manga adaptation, several spin-off light novels, and an anime television series adaptation
- I've Somehow Gotten Stronger When I Improved My Farm-Related Skills (2016–2018) by Shobonnu - acquired by Futabasha, received a manga adaptation and an anime television series adaptation
- If It's for My Daughter, I'd Even Defeat a Demon Lord (2014–2017) by Chirolu - acquired by Hobby Japan, received a manga adaptation and an anime television series adaptation
- If the Villainess and Villain Met and Fell in Love (2021–2022) by Harunadon - acquired by SB Creative, received a manga adaptation
- In a World Full of Zombies I'm the Only One Who Doesn't Get Attacked (2013–present) by Rokuro Uraji - acquired by Frontier Works, received a manga adaptation and an anime television series adaptation
- In Another World with My Smartphone (2013–ongoing) by Patora Fuyuhara - acquired by Hobby Japan, received a manga adaptation and an anime television series adaptation
- In the Land of Leadale (2010–2012) by Ceez - acquired by Enterbrain, received a manga adaptation and an anime television series adaptation
- Infinite Dendrogram (2015–ongoing) by Sakon Kaidō - acquired by Hobby Japan, received a manga adaptation and an anime television series adaptation
- Inside the Tentacle Cave (2013–ongoing) by Umetane - acquired by Kadokawa Shoten, received a manga adaptation
- Isekai Cheat Magician (2012–ongoing) by Takeru Uchida - acquired by Shufunotomo, received a manga adaptation and an anime television series adaptation
- Isekai Izakaya "Nobu" (2012–ongoing) by Natsuya Semikawa - acquired by Takarajimasha, received a manga adaptation, an original net animation adaptation, and a live-action drama adaptation
- Isekai Tensei: Recruited to Another World (2015–2023) by Kenichi - acquired by Mag Garden, received a manga adaptation
- Ishura (2017–ongoing, also on Kakuyomu) by Keiso - acquired by ASCII Media Works, received a manga adaptation and an anime television series adaptation
- Jack-of-All-Trades, Party of None (2021–ongoing) by Itsuki Togami - acquired by Kodansha, received a manga adaptation and an anime television series adaptation
- JK Haru is a Sex Worker in Another World (2016–2017) by Kō Hiratori - acquired by Hayakawa Publishing, received a manga adaptation
- Kajidaikō no Arubaito o Hajimetara Gakuen Ichi no Bishōjo no Kazoku ni Kiniirarechaimashita (2023–present) by Shiohon - acquired by SB Creative, received a manga adaptation
- Knight's & Magic (2010–ongoing) by Hisago Amazake-no - acquired by Shufunotomo, received a manga adaptation and an anime television series adaptation
- KonoSuba (2012–2013) by Natsume Akatsuki - acquired by Kadokawa Shoten, received a spin-off light novel series, a manga adaptation, and an anime television series adaptation
- Kuma Kuma Kuma Bear (2014–ongoing) by Kumanano - acquired by Shufu to Seikatsu Sha, received a manga adaptation and an anime television series adaptation
- Kunon the Sorcerer Can See (2021–present) by Umikaze Minamino - acquired by Fujimi Shobo, received a manga adaptation and an anime television series adaptation
- Kusunoki's Garden of Gods (2021–ongoing) by Enju - acquired by ASCII Media Works, received a manga adaptation and an anime television series adaptation
- Lazy Dungeon Master (2015–ongoing) by Supana Onikage - acquired by Overlap, received a manga adaptation
- Let This Grieving Soul Retire! (2018–ongoing) by Tsukikage - acquired by Micro Magazine, received a manga adaptation and an anime television series adaptation
- Log Horizon (2010–ongoing) by Mamare Touno - acquired by Enterbrain, received several manga adaptations and an anime television series adaptation
- Loner Life in Another World (2016–ongoing) by Shoji Goji - acquired by Overlap, received a manga adaptation and an anime television series adaptation
- Magic Maker: How to Make Magic in Another World (2017–ongoing) by Kazuki Kaburagi - acquired by Media Factory, received a manga adaptation and an anime television series adaptation
- Magic Stone Gourmet: Eating Magical Power Made Me the Strongest! (2017–ongoing) by Ryou Yuuki - acquired by Fujimi Shobo, received a manga adaptation
- Magical Buffs: The Support Caster Is Stronger Than He Realized! (2020–ongoing) by Haka Tokura - acquired by Futabasha, received a manga adaptation
- Magical Explorer (2018–ongoing) by Iris - acquired by Kadokawa Shoten, received a manga adaptation and an anime adaptation
- Maigo ni Natteita Yōjo o Tasuketara, Otonari ni Sumu Bishōjo Ryūgakusei ga Ie ni Asobi ni Kuru yō ni Natta Ken ni Tsuite (2019–present) by Nekokuro - acquired by Shueisha, received a manga adaptation
- Management of a Novice Alchemist (2018–ongoing) by Mizuho Itsuki - acquired by Fujimi Shobo, received a manga adaptation and an anime television series adaptation
- Megami "Isekai Tensei Nani ni Naritai desu ka" Ore "Yūsha no Rokkotsu de" (2017–2024, also on Kakuyomu) by Antai - acquired by Takarajimasha, received an anime television series adaptation
- Mercedes and the Waning Moon (2018–2022) by Firehead - acquired by TO Books, received a manga adaptation and an anime adaptation
- Modern Villainess: It's Not Easy Building a Corporate Empire Before the Crash (2018–present) by Tofuro Futsukaichi - acquired by Overlap, received a manga adaptation
- Monster Eater (2023–present) by Renkinō - acquired by Earth Star Entertainment, received a manga adaptation and an anime television series adaptation
- Multi-Mind Mayhem: Isekai Tensei Soudouki (2013–2016, moved to AlphaPolis) by Ryousen Takami - acquired by AlphaPolis, received a manga adaptation
- Mushoku Tensei (2012–2015) by Rifujin na Magonote - acquired by Media Factory, received a manga adaptation and an anime television series adaptation
- My Daughter Left the Nest and Returned an S-Rank Adventurer (2017–2020) by Mojikakiya - acquired by Earth Star Entertainment, received a manga adaptation and an anime television series adaptation
- My Death Flags Show No Sign of Ending (2014–present) by Izumi - acquired by Takarajimasha, received a manga adaptation and an anime television series adaptation
- My Girlfriend Cheated on Me, and Now My Flirty Underclassman Won't Leave Me Alone! (2017–2021, also on Kakuyomu) by Yū Omiya - acquired by Kadokawa Shoten, received a manga adaptation
- My Happy Marriage by Akumi Agitogi - acquired by Fujimi Shobo, received a manga adaptation, a live-action film adaptation, and an anime television series adaptation
- My Instant Death Ability Is So Overpowered (2016–2023) by Tsuyoshi Fujitaka - acquired by Earth Star Entertainment, received a manga adaptation and an anime television series adaptation
- My Isekai Life (2017–2020) by Shinkoshoto - acquired by SB Creative, received a manga adaptation and an anime television series adaptation
- My Next Life as a Villainess: All Routes Lead to Doom! (2014–2015) by Satoru Yamaguchi - acquired by Ichijinsha, received two manga adaptations and an anime television series adaptation
- My One-Hit Kill Sister (2019–2023) by Konoe - received a manga adaptation and an anime television series adaptation
- My Quiet Blacksmith Life in Another World (2018–present) by Tamamaru - acquired by Fujimi Shobo, received a manga adaptation
- My Status as an Assassin Obviously Exceeds the Hero's (2017–ongoing) by Matsuri Akai - acquired by Overlap, received a manga adaptation and an anime television series adaptation
- My Unique Skill Makes Me OP Even at Level 1 (2017–2020) by Nazuna Miki - acquired by Kodansha, received a manga adaptation and an anime television series adaptation
- Necromancer Isekai: How I Went from Abandoned Villager to the Emperor's Favorite (2020–present) by Nazuna Miki - acquired by Shueisha, received a manga adaptation and an anime television series adaptation
- New Life+: Young Again in Another World (2014–2018) by MINE - acquired by Hobby Japan, received a manga adaptation
- New Saga (2012–2018) by Masayuki Abe - acquired by AlphaPolis, received a manga adaptation and an anime television series adaptation
- Nia Liston: The Merciless Maiden (2019–2021) by Umikaze Minamino - acquired by Hobby Japan, received a manga adaptation and an anime adaptation
- No-Clipping My Way to Supremacy! (2021–ongoing) by Nikita Kitagawa - acquired by Kodansha, received a manga adaptation and an anime television series adaptation
- Noble Reincarnation: Born Blessed, So I'll Obtain Ultimate Power (2019–ongoing) by Nazuna Miki - acquired by SB Creative, received a manga adaptation and an anime television series adaptation
- Now I'm a Demon Lord! Happily Ever After with Monster Girls in My Dungeon (2016–ongoing) by Ryūyū - acquired by Fujimi Shobo, received a manga adaptation
- Oh Boy, Was I Wrong About Her (2020–ongoing) by Yu Hibari - acquired by Kadokawa Shoten, received a manga adaptation and an anime television series adaptation
- Orc Eroica (2019–ongoing) by Rifujin na Magonote - acquired by Fujimi Shobo, received a manga adaptation
- Overlord (2010–2012) by Kugane Maruyama - acquired by Enterbrain, received a manga adaptation and an anime television series adaptation
- Parallel World Pharmacy (2015–ongoing) by Liz Takayama - acquired by Media Factory, received a manga adaptation and an anime television series adaptation
- Pass the Monster Meat, Milady! (2019–ongoing) by Kanata Hoshi - acquired by Kodansha, received a manga adaptation and an anime television series adaptation
- Peddler in Another World: I Can Go Back to My World Whenever I Want! (2019-ongoing) by Hiiro Shimotsuki - acquired by Hobby Japan, received a manga adaptation
- Pens Down, Swords Up: Throw Your Studies to the Wind (2022–ongoing) by Mao Nishiura - acquired by Fujimi Shobo, received a manga adaptation
- Reborn as a Space Mercenary: I Woke Up Piloting the Strongest Starship! (2019–present) by Ryūto - acquired by Fujimi Shobo, received a manga adaptation and an anime adaptation
- Reborn as a Vending Machine, I Now Wander the Dungeon (2016) by Hirukuma - acquired by Kadokawa Shoten, received a manga adaptation and an anime television series adaptation
- Reborn to Master the Blade: From Hero-King to Extraordinary Squire (2019–ongoing) by Hayaken – acquired by Hobby Japan, received a manga adaptation, a mini anime adaptation, and an anime television series adaptation
- Rebuild World (2017–ongoing, also on Kakuyomu) by Nahuse - acquired by ASCII Media Works, received a manga adaptation and an anime television series adaptation
- Record of Wortenia War (2009–ongoing) by Ryota Hori - acquired by Hobby Japan, received a manga adaptation
- Redo of Healer (2016–ongoing) by Rui Tsukiyo - acquired by Kadokawa Shoten, received a manga adaptation and an anime television series adaptation
- Reincarnated as a Dragon Hatchling (2015–present) by Nekoko - acquired by Earth Star Entertainment and Square Enix, received a manga adaptation and an anime television series adaptation
- Reincarnated as a Neglected Noble (2018–ongoing) by Yashiro - acquired by TO Books, received a manga adaptation, two stage play adaptations, and an anime television series adaptation
- Reincarnated as a Sword (2015–ongoing) by Yuu Tanaka - acquired by Micro Magazine, received two manga adaptations and an anime television series adaptation
- Reincarnated as the Daughter of the Legendary Hero and the Queen of Spirits (2016–2020) by Matsuura - acquired by Fujimi Shobo, received a manga adaptation and an anime television series adaptation
- Reincarnated in a Mafia Dating Sim (2022–present) by Touko Amekawa - acquired by TO Books, received a manga adaptation and an anime adaptation
- Reincarnated Into a Game as the Hero's Friend: Running the Kingdom Behind the Scenes (2021–ongoing) by Yuki Suzuki - acquired by Overlap, received a manga adaptation
- Restaurant to Another World (2013–ongoing) by Junpei Inuzuka - acquired by Shufunotomo, received two manga adaptations and an anime television series adaptation
- Return from Death (2020–2021) by Eiko Mutsuhana - acquired by Earth Star Entertainment, received a manga adaptation
- Re:Monster (2011–2018) by Kogitsune Kanekiru - acquired by AlphaPolis, received a manga adaptation, a sequel light novel series, and an anime television series adaptation
- Re:Zero − Starting Life in Another World (2012–ongoing) by Tappei Nagatsuki - acquired by Media Factory, received several manga adaptations and an anime television series adaptation
- Rich Girl Caretaker (2020–2021) by Yusaku Sakaishi - acquired by Hobby Japan, received a manga adaptation and an anime television series adaptation
- Roll Over and Die (2018–ongoing) by kiki - acquired by Micro Magazine, received a manga adaptation and anime television series adaptation
- Royal Spirits Are a Royal Pain! Give Me a Regular Romance (2019–2022) by Rei Kazama - acquired by TO Books, received a manga adaptation
- Romelia War Chronicle: The Count's Daughter Rallies an Army in the Wake of Mankind's Victory (2019–ongoing) by Ryō Ariyama - acquired by Shogakukan, received a manga adaptation and an anime adaptation
- Sasaki and Peeps (2018–ongoing, also on Kakuyomu) by Buncololi - acquired by Media Factory, received a manga adaptation and an anime television series adaptation
- Saving 80,000 Gold in Another World for My Retirement (2015–ongoing) by FUNA - acquired by Kodansha, received a manga adaptation and an anime television series adaptation
- Scooped Up by an S-Rank Adventurer! (2020–ongoing) by Sora Suigetsu - acquired by Futabasha, received a manga adaptation and an anime television series adaptation
- Secrets of the Silent Witch (2020) by Matsuri Isora - acquired by Fujimi Shobo, received a manga adaptation, a prequel light novel series, and an anime adaptation
- Seirei Gensouki: Spirit Chronicles (2014–2020) by Yuri Kitayama - acquired by Hobby Japan, received two manga adaptations and an anime television series adaptation
- Sengoku Komachi Kurōtan (2013–ongoing) by Kyōchikutō - acquired by Earth Star Entertainment, received a manga adaptation
- Sexiled (2018–2019) by Kaeruda Ameko - acquired by Overlap, received a manga adaptation
- Shangri-La Frontier (2017–ongoing) by Katarina - received a manga adaptation and an anime television series adaptation
- She Professed Herself Pupil of the Wise Man (2012–ongoing) by Hirotsugu Ryusen - acquired by Micro Magazine, received a manga adaptation and an anime television series adaptation
- Skeleton Knight in Another World (2014–2018) by Ennki Hakari - acquired by Overlap, received a manga adaptation and an anime television series adaptation
- So I'm a Spider, So What? (2015–2022) by Okina Baba - acquired by Fujimi Shobo, received two manga adaptations and an anime television series adaptation
- Summoned to Another World... Again? (2015–2016) by Kazuha Kishimoto - acquired by Futabasha, received a manga adaptation and an anime television series adaptation
- Survival in Another World with My Mistress! (2018–ongoing) by Ryūto - acquired by Micro Magazine, received a manga adaptation
- Sweet Reincarnation (2015–ongoing) by Nozomu Koryu - acquired by TO Books, received a manga adaptation and an anime television series adaptation
- Sword of the Demon Hunter: Kijin Gentōshō (2015–2016, moved from Arcadia) by Moto'o Nakanishi - acquired by Futabasha, received a manga adaptation and an anime television series adaptation
- Taking My Reincarnation One Step at a Time: No One Told Me There Would Be Monsters! (2019–ongoing) by Kaya - acquired by Media Factory, received a manga adaptation
- Tearmoon Empire (2018–ongoing) by Nozomu Mochitsuki - acquired by TO Books, received a manga adaptation, two stage play adaptations, and an anime television series adaptation
- Teogonia (2017–present) by Tsukasa Tanimai - acquired by Shufu to Seikatsu Sha, received a manga adaptation and an anime television series adaptation
- That Time I Got Reincarnated as a Slime (2013–2016) by Fuse - acquired by Micro Magazine, received several manga adaptations and an anime television series adaptation
- The 100th Time's the Charm: She Was Executed 99 Times, So How Did She Unlock "Super Love" Mode?! (2022) by Yūji Yūji (Hima Maruyama) - acquired by Drecom Media, received a manga adaptation and an anime adaptation
- The 8th Son? Are You Kidding Me? (2013–2017) by Y.A. - acquired by Media Factory, received a manga adaptation and an anime television series adaptation
- The Angel Next Door Spoils Me Rotten (2018–ongoing) by Saekisan - acquired by SB Creative, received a manga adaptation and an anime television series adaptation
- The Apothecary Diaries (2011–ongoing) by Hyūganatsu - acquired by Shufunotomo, received two manga adaptations and an anime television series adaptation
- The Banished Court Magician Aims to Become the Strongest (2020–ongoing) by Alto - acquired by Kodansha, received a manga adaptation and an anime television series adaptation
- The Banished Former Hero Lives as He Pleases (2018–2019) by Shin Kozuki - acquired by TO Books, received a manga adaptation and an anime television series adaptation
- The Brilliant Healer's New Life in the Shadows (2020–ongoing) by Sakaku Hishikawa - acquired by SB Creative, received a manga adaptation, a webtoon adaptation, and an anime television series adaptation
- The Cat and the Dragon (2013–2014) by Amara - acquired by Takarajimasha, received a manga adaptation and an anime television series adaptation
- The Condemned Villainess Goes Back in Time and Aims to Become the Ultimate Villain (2020–ongoing) by Bakufu Narayama - acquired by TO Books, received a manga adaptation and a stage play adaptation
- The Daily Life of a Middle-Aged Online Shopper in Another World (2017–2021) by Hifumi Asakura - acquired by SB Creative and Tugikuru Corporation, received a manga adaptation and an anime television series adaptation
- The Death Mage (2015–ongoing) by Densuke - acquired by Hifumi Shobō, received a manga adaptation
- The Diary of a Middle-Aged Sage's Carefree Life in Another World (2018–ongoing) by Yasukiyo Kotobuki - acquired by Media Factory, received two manga adaptations and a spin-off light novel series
- The Do-Over Damsel Conquers the Dragon Emperor (2019–ongoing) by Sarasa Nagase - acquired by Kadokawa Shoten, received a manga adaptation and an anime television series adaptation
- The Drab Princess, the Black Cat, and the Satisfying Break-Up (2020–present) by Rino Mayumi - acquired by Futabasha, received a manga adaptation
- The Dreaming Boy Is a Realist (2018–ongoing) by Okemaru - acquired by Hobby Japan, received a manga adaptation and an anime television series adaptation
- The Eminence in Shadow (2018–ongoing) by Daisuke Aizawa - acquired by Enterbrain, received two manga adaptations and an anime television series adaptation
- The Faraway Paladin (2015–ongoing) by Kanata Yanagino - acquired by Overlap, received a manga adaptation and an anime television series adaptation
- The Eternal Fool's Words of Wisdom (2015–2019) by Hifumi - acquired by Earth Star Entertainment, received a manga adaptation and an anime television series adaptation
- The Exiled Heavy Knight Knows How to Game the System (2021–ongoing) by Nekoko - acquired by Kodansha, received a manga adaptation and an anime television series adaptation
- The Frontier Lord Begins with Zero Subjects (2018–ongoing) by Fuurou - acquired by Earth Star Entertainment, received a manga adaptation and an anime television series adaptation
- The Fruit of Evolution (2014–ongoing) by Miku - acquired by Futabasha, received a manga adaptation and an anime television series adaptation
- The Girl I Saved on the Train Turned Out to Be My Childhood Friend (2019–2020) by Kennoji - acquired by SB Creative, received a manga adaptation
- The Gorilla God's Go-To Girl (2020–2021) by Shirohi - received a manga adaptation and an anime television series adaptation
- The Great Cleric (2015–2022) by Broccoli Lion - acquired by Micro Magazine, received a manga adaptation and an anime television series adaptation
- The Greatest Demon Lord Is Reborn as a Typical Nobody (2017–2022) by Myōjin Katō - acquired by Fujimi Shobo, received a manga adaptation and an anime television series adaptation
- The Greatest Magicmaster's Retirement Plan (2015–ongoing) by Izushiro - acquired by Hobby Japan, received two manga adaptations
- The Healer Who Was Banished From His Party, Is, in Fact, the Strongest (2018–ongoing) by Kagekinoko - acquired by Futabasha, received a manga adaptation and an anime television series adaptation
- The Hidden Dungeon Only I Can Enter (2017–2021) by Meguru Seto - acquired by Kodansha, received a manga adaptation and an anime television series adaptation
- The Holy Grail of Eris (2017–present) by Kujira Tokiwa - acquired by SB Creative (formerly) and Drecom Media, received two manga adaptations and an anime television series adaptation
- The Iceblade Sorcerer Shall Rule the World (2019–ongoing) by Nana Mikoshiba - acquired by Kodansha, received a manga adaptation and an anime television series adaptation
- The Ideal Sponger Life (2011–ongoing) by Tsunehiko Watanabe - acquired by Shufunotomo, received a manga adaptation and an anime television series adaptation
- The Insipid Prince's Furtive Grab for The Throne (2019–ongoing) by Tanba - acquired by Kadokawa Shoten, received a manga adaptation and an anime adaptation
- The Irregular at Magic High School (2008–2011) by Tsutomu Satō - acquired by ASCII Media Works, received several manga adaptations and an anime television series adaptation
- The Magical Revolution of the Reincarnated Princess and the Genius Young Lady (2019–2021) by Piero Karasu - acquired by Fujimi Shobo, received a manga adaptation and an anime television series adaptation
- The Misfit of Demon King Academy (2017–ongoing) by Shu - acquired by ASCII Media Works, received a manga adaptation and an anime television series adaptation
- The Most Heretical Last Boss Queen (2018–ongoing) by Tenichi - acquired by Ichijinsha, received a manga adaptation and an anime television series adaptation
- The Most Notorious "Talker" Runs the World's Greatest Clan (2019–2020) by Jaki - acquired by Overlap, received a manga adaptation and an anime television series adaptation
- The New Gate (2013–2016) by Shinogi Kazanami - acquired by AlphaPolis, received a manga adaptation and an anime television series adaptation
- The Oblivious Saint Can't Contain Her Power (2020–2023) by Almond - acquired by Earth Star Entertainment, received a manga adaptation and an anime television series adaptation
- The Only Thing I'd Do in a No-Boys-Allowed Gaming World (2021–ongoing) by Ryo Hazakura - acquired by Media Factory, received a manga adaptation
- The Ossan Newbie Adventurer (also on Kakuyomu) by Kiraku Kishima - acquired by Hobby Japan, received a manga adaptation and an anime television series adaptation
- The Other World's Books Depend on the Bean Counter (2018) by Yatsuki Wakatsu - acquired by Enterbrain, received a manga adaptation and an anime adaptation
- The Otome Heroine's Fight for Survival (2019–2022) by Harunohi Biyori - acquired by TO Books, received a manga adaptation and an anime adaptation
- The Person I Loved Asked Me to Die in My Sister's Stead (2020–2022) by Mizuki Nagano - acquired by TO Books, received a manga adaptation
- The Reincarnation of the Strongest Exorcist in Another World (2018–ongoing) by Kiichi Kosuzu - acquired by Futabasha, received a manga adaptation and an anime television series adaptation
- The Rising of the Shield Hero (2012–ongoing) by Aneko Yusagi - acquired by Media Factory, received a manga adaptation and an anime television series adaptation
- The Saint's Magic Power Is Omnipotent (2016–ongoing) by Yuka Tachibana - acquired by Fujimi Shobo, received a manga adaptation and an anime television series adaptation
- The Salty Koharu Has a Soft Spot for Me (2019–2021) by Kazami Sawatari - acquired by Shogakukan, received a manga adaptation and an anime television series adaptation
- The Strongest Magician in the Demon Lord's Army Was a Human (2016–ongoing) by Ryousuke Hata - acquired by Futabasha, received a manga adaptation and an anime television series adaptation
- The Strongest Man, Born From Misfortune (2017–ongoing) by Fukufuku - acquired by Starts Publishing, received a manga adaptation and an anime television series adaptation
- The Strongest Sage with the Weakest Crest (2016–2020) by Shinkoshoto - acquired by SB Creative, received a manga adaptation, a side story light novel series, and an anime television series adaptation
- The Strongest Tank's Labyrinth Raids (2018–2021) by Ryūta Kijima - acquired by Shufunotomo, received a manga adaptation and an anime television series adaptation
- The Tales of Marielle Clarac (2015–ongoing) by Haruka Momo - acquired by Ichijinsha, received a manga adaptation
- The Tanaka Family Reincarnates (2019–ongoing) by Choco - acquired by Fujimi Shobo, received a manga adaptation
- The Too-Perfect Saint: Tossed Aside by My Fiancé and Sold to Another Kingdom (2020–2022) by Kōki Fuyutsuki - acquired by Overlap, received a manga adaptation and an anime television series adaptation
- The Unwanted Undead Adventurer (2016–ongoing) by Yū Okano - acquired by Overlap, received a manga adaptation and an anime television series adaptation
- The Villager of Level 999 (2015–2018) by Koneko Hoshitsuki - acquired by Enterbrain, received a manga adaptation
- The Villainess and the Demon Knight (2017–present) by Nekoda - acquired by Ichijinsha, received a manga adaptation
- The Villainess Is Adored by the Prince of the Neighbor Kingdom (2016–ongoing) by Puni-chan - acquired by Enterbrain, received a manga adaptation, a visual novel adaptation, and an anime television series adaptation
- The Villainess's Guide to (Not) Falling in Love (2020–present) by Touya - acquired by Square Enix, received a manga adaptation
- The Water Magician (2020–ongoing) by Tadashi Kudou - acquired by TO Books, received a manga adaptation and an anime television series adaptation
- The Weakest Tamer Began a Journey to Pick Up Trash (2018–ongoing) by Honobonoru500 - acquired by TO Books, received a manga adaptation and an anime television series adaptation
- The White Cat's Revenge as Plotted from the Dragon King's Lap (2015–2024) by Kureha - acquired by Frontier Works, received a manga adaptation
- The World's Finest Assassin Gets Reincarnated in Another World as an Aristocrat (2018–2021) by Rui Tsukiyo - acquired by Kadokawa Shoten, received a manga adaptation and an anime television series adaptation
- The World's Least Interesting Master Swordsman (2017–present) by Rokurō Akashi - acquired by Shufu to Seikatsu Sha, received a manga adaptation
- The Wrong Way to Use Healing Magic (2014–ongoing) by Kurokata - acquired by Media Factory, received a manga adaptation and an anime television series adaptation
- There Was a Cute Girl in the Hero's Party, So I Tried Confessing to Her (2013–ongoing) by Suisei - acquired by Futabasha, received a manga adaptation and an anime television series adaptation
- There's No Way a Side Character Like Me Could Be Popular, Right? (2018–ongoing) by Sekaiichi - acquired by Overlap, received a manga adaptation
- They Don't Know I'm Too Young for the Adventurer's Guild (2021–ongoing) by KAME - acquired by Micro Magazine, received a manga adaptation
- This Is Screwed Up, but I Was Reincarnated as a Girl in Another World! (2017–ongoing) by Ashi - acquired by Kodansha, received a manga adaptation
- Though I Am an Inept Villainess (2020–ongoing) by Satsuki Nakamura - acquired by Ichijinsha, received a manga adaptation
- To Another World... with Land Mines! (2018–ongoing) by Mizuho Itsuki - acquired by Fujimi Shobo, received a manga adaptation
- Trapped in a Dating Sim: The World of Otome Games Is Tough for Mobs (2017–2019) by Yomu Mishima - acquired by Micro Magazine, received a manga adaptation and an anime television series adaptation
- True Love Fades Away When the Contract Ends (2020–2021) by Kosuzu Kobato - acquired by Micro Magazine, received a manga adaptation
- Tsukimichi: Moonlit Fantasy (2012–2016, moved to AlphaPolis) by Kei Azumi - acquired by AlphaPolis, received a manga adaptation and an anime television series adaptation
- Uglymug, Epicfighter (2015–2022) by Ryō Hiromatsu - acquired by Kobunsha, received two manga adaptations and an anime television series adaptation
- Unnamed Memory (2012–ongoing) by Kuji Furumiya - acquired by ASCII Media Works, received a manga adaptation and an anime television series adaptation
- Victoria of Many Faces (2021–ongoing) by Syuu - acquired by Media Factory, received a manga adaptation and an anime television series adaptation
- Villainess Level 99 (2018–ongoing) by Satori Tanabata - acquired by Fujimi Shobo, received a manga adaptation an anime television series adaptation
- Watashi no Ofuru de Waruin dakedo (2024) by Puri - received an anime adaptation
- Welcome to Japan, Ms. Elf! (2017–ongoing) by Makishima Suzuki - acquired by Hobby Japan, received a manga adaptation and an anime television series adaptation
- Welcome to the Outcast's Restaurant! (2018–2020) by Yūki Kimikawa - acquired by Overlap, received a manga adaptation and an anime television series adaptation
- Who Killed the Hero? (2023) by Daken - acquired by Kadokawa Shoten, received a manga adaptation
- Witch and Mercenary (2021–ongoing) by Kaeru Chōhōkiteki - acquired by Micro Magazine, received a manga adaptation and an anime television series adaptation
- Within the Villainess (2020) by Reia—acquired by Ichijinsha, received a manga adaptation and an anime television series adaptation
- Wise Man's Grandchild (2015–2022) by Tsuyoshi Yoshioka - acquired by Enterbrain, received a manga adaptation and an anime television series adaptation
- Your Castle's Little Helper (2021–present) by Kazuhito Minagi - acquired by Square Enix, received a manga adaptation

== See also ==
- Jinjiang Literature City – Chinese publisher of web fiction
- Kakao Page – South Korean content platform
- Qidian – Chinese online literature website
- Wattpad – Online community themed around reading and writing

== Bibliography ==
- Fukazawa, Yusuke; Watanabe, Makoto (2025). "Quantitative Analysis of Emotional Changes in Narrative Progression of Popular Web Novels". Transactions of the Japanese Society for Artificial Intelligence. 40 (5). The Japanese Society for Artificial Intelligence: 1–10. doi:10.1527/tjsai.40-5_MO25-C.
- Ichishi, Iida; Ma, Scott (Summer 2025). "Japanese Web Novels: Media History, Platform, and Narrative". Mechademia. 17 (2). University of Minnesota Press: 150–167 – via Project MUSE.
- Kume, Yoriko (2022). "Countdown to the Demise of Girls' Novels". U.S.-Japan Women's Journal (62). Translated by Hartley, Barbara. University of Hawaiʻi Press: 133–149. doi:10.1353/jwj.2022.0012.
- McIlroy, Tara (June 11, 2024). "Fanfiction Experiences of Japanese Students: Connecting Wild Reading and L2 Learning". In Kersten, Saskia; Ludwig, Christian (eds.). Born-Digital Texts in the English Language Classroom. Channel View Publications. pp. 204–219. ISBN 9781800414822.
- Nam, Yoomin (2024). "The Study of Japanese Web Novels Using Text Mining: Focusing on 'Shōsetsuka ni Narō' and 'Kakuyomu'". Border Crossings: The Journal of Japanese-Language Literature Studies. 19 (1): 139–158. doi:10.22628/bcjjl.2024.19.1.139.
- Richings, Vicky A. (2023). "The Future of Japanese Literature: Born-Digital?". Journal of Waseda International House of Literature. 1. Waseda International House of Literature: 22–32.
- Saito, Satomi (August 31, 2025). "Narrative in the Digital Age: From Light Novels to Web Serials". In Hutchinson, Rachael; Morton, Leith Douglas (eds.). Routledge Handbook of Modern Japanese Literature (2nd ed.). Routledge. pp. 357–370. doi:10.4324/9781003508229. ISBN 9781032821528.
- Tagliamonte, Giovanni; Yang, Yaochong (November 3, 2021). "Isekai: Tracing Interactive Control in Non-interactive Media". In Beil, Benjamin; Freyermuth, Gundolf S.; Schmidt, Hanns Christian (eds.). Paratextualizing Games: Investigations on the Paraphernalia and Peripheries of Play. Transcript Verlag. pp. 341–372. doi:10.14361/9783839454213-015. ISBN 9783837654219.
- Yasuaki, Dan (2020). 協働としてのオンライン小説――オンライン小説投稿サイトの感想欄に注目して――. The Annual Review of Sociology (in Japanese) (33). Japan Sociological Society: 24–31. doi:10.5690/kantoh.2020.24. ISSN 0919-4363.
