= Modern Villainess: It's Not Easy Building a Corporate Empire Before the Crash =

Japanese light novel series

- First light novel volume cover

現代社会で乙女ゲームの悪役令嬢をするのはちょっと大変 (Gendai Shakai de Otome Game no Akuyaku Reijō o Suru no wa Chotto Taihen)
- Genre: Modern fantasy; Isekai
- Novel series
- Written by: Tofuro Futsukaichi
- Published by: Shōsetsuka ni Narō
- Original run: June 1, 2018 – present
- Light novel
- Written by: Tofuro Futsukaichi
- Illustrated by: Kei
- Published by: Overlap
- English publisher: NA: Seven Seas Entertainment
- Imprint: Overlap Novels
- Original run: September 25, 2020 – present
- Volumes: 8
- Manga
- Written by: Tofuro Futskaichi
- Illustrated by: Data
- Published by: Overlap
- English publisher: NA: Titan Manga
- Imprint: Gardo Comics
- Magazine: Comic Gardo
- Original run: December 9, 2022 – present
- Volumes: 4

Modern Villainess: It's Not Easy Building a Corporate Empire Before the Crash (現代社会で乙女ゲームの悪役令嬢をするのはちょっと大変, Gendai Shakai de Otome Game no Akuyaku Reijō o Suru no wa Chotto Taihen) is a Japanese light novel series written by Tofuro Futsukaichi and illustrated by Kei. It began serialization on Shōsetsuka ni Narō in June 2018. It was later acquired by Overlap who began publishing it under their Overlap Novels imprint in September 2020. A manga adaptation illustrated by Data began serialization on Overlap's Comic Gardo manga website in December 2022.

== Premise ==
In the aftermath of the 2008 financial crisis, an office lady dies after being made redundant at her company. She is later reborn as the infant Runa Keikain, the villainess from the otome game Where the Cherry Blossoms Fall. Set in a Japan that fought its way to a conditional surrender in the Pacific War, Runa is destined to lose her life and wealth on 9/15/08 to the financial crash. Equipped with nearly 15 years of financial knowledge and how the game will play out, Runa sets out to save not only herself but prevent Japan's financial collapse.

== Characters ==
Runa Keikain (桂華院瑠奈, Keikain Runa)
Ignoring the otome plot, Runa focuses on building her own personal fortune, while her butler acts as the intermediary due to her age, all choices come from her. To revitalize the businesses she purchases, Runa fires all the top level employees for incompetence. She also takes advantage of the Dot Com Bubble to rapidly grow her wealth before it bursts. Though a ruthless business woman, Runa cares for her small found family.
It later turns that she is of extremely collateral Romanov blood, with the Russian government investigating her Moonlight Fund; believing the missing treasure is being laundered.
Ryuuji Tachibana (橘隆二, Tachibana Ryūji)
Runa's butler who takes her seriously as he knows she's not a normal child. Ryusui collected various intel for her in order to grow her wealth and keeps an eye out for any bad news that can threaten their businesses.
Susumu Ichigo (一条進, Ichigo Susumu)
Branch manager of the Far Eastern bank. Like Ryuuji, he is very much aware Runa is smarter than a child and is terrified of her for the vast economic knowledge she holds. He does have moments of knowing more than she does; Susumu having needed to explain the Moonlight Fund is just a cover name for Runa's off shores account and not a proper business.
He typically serves as a stand in for the audience; questioning Runa's choices and leading to some of he economic explanations in the story.
Aki Tokitou (時任亜紀, Tokitō Aki)
Runa's maid and sister figure. When Runa grows her wealth enough, she pays for Aki to go to college.
Keiko Saitou (斉藤佳子, Saitō Keiko)
Runa's cook and nanny. She was formerly a lover of Runa's grandfather and thus trusted with raising her.
Mizuho Takanashi (小鳥遊瑞穂, Takanashi Mizuho)
Heroine of the otome game. Because Runa spent their childhood refusing to bully her, Mizuho thinks they are friends.

== Media ==
=== Light novel ===
Written by Tofuro Futsukaichi, Modern Villainess: It's Not Easy Building a Corporate Empire Before the Crash began serialization on Shōsetsuka ni Narō on June 1, 2018. It was later acquired by Overlap who began publishing the series with illustrations by Kei under their Overlap Novels light novel imprint on September 25, 2020. Eight volumes have been released as of February 25, 2026.

In September 2021, Seven Seas Entertainment announced that they had licensed the series for English publication.

No.	Original release date	Original ISBN	North American release date	North American ISBN
1	September 25, 2020	978-4-86554-742-9	May 12, 2022 (digital); June 21, 2022 (print)	978-1-63858-209-0
1. "September 15th, 2008"; 2. "The Lady's Flight"; 3. "A Lady's Everyday Life"; 4. "Why My Hair Is Blonde"; 5. "The Atonement of Keikain Nakamaro"; 6. "Why My Hair Is Blonde: A Number of Newspaper Extracts"; 7. "Toudou Nagayoshi's Lucky Strikes"; 8. "Little Queen"; 9. "Vultures and the 1998 House of Councilors Election"
2	March 25, 2021	978-4-86554-848-8	September 1, 2022 (digital); November 1, 2022 (print)	978-1-63858-349-3
1. "The Sullivan Report"; 2. "The Grade-Schooler and Her Place Fuchigami's Regime"; 3. "The Party at Meguro's Wise Dragon King's Palace"; 4. "A Lady's Everyday Life: Fall 1998-Summer 1999"; 5. "Heisei Queen of the Railway Izumikawa's Regime"; 6. "A Lady's Everyday Life: The Year 2000"; 7. "Tachibana-san's Home"; 8. "Cassandra's Struggle"
3	August 25, 2021	978-4-86554-982-9	July 20, 2023 (digital); July 25, 2023 (print)	978-1-63858-701-9
1. "TV Live Watch pt. 2001"; 2. "Ichijou Erika, Graduate or Professor Kanbe's Seminar, and Her New Job"; 3. "Keikain Runa's Birthday"; 4. "Director Marefuji's Unsolved Case Files"; 5. "The Last Days of the Den-en-chofu Manor"; 6. "Okazaki Yuuichi's Job"; 7. "Cassandra's Lament"; 8. "Article Extracts / Terrorism Stories"; 9. "Column: The Hell of Afghanistan"; 10. "The Moonlight Fund's Intelligence Meeting"; 11. "The Lady's Field Trip: Elementary School Edition"; 12. "When the Lady Is Away"; 13. "The Rise and Fall of the Electricity Disruptor"; 14. "The Gentlemen's Pact"
4	December 25, 2022	978-4-8240-0165-8	February 1, 2024 (digital); February 27, 2024 (print)	978-1-68579-630-3
1. "The Banker Reminisces"; 2. "The Lady's Pursuits: Horses, Furukawa Telecoms, and Conflict"; 3. "The White House's Nervous Smile"; 4. "To Admit Defeat Is to Grow as a Person"; 5. "The Lady's Daily Life: First Half of 2002"; 6. "The Keika Group's Reorganization"; 7. "Mission Impossible"; 8. Interlude: "Keika Railway Thread #38"; 9. "One Day on a Talk Show"; 10. "The Lady's Defensive War"; 11. "Conference Call: Japanese-American Leaders"; 12. "Time to Eat"; 13. "An Unappealing Banquet"
5	January 25, 2024	978-4-8240-0714-8	September 19, 2024 (digital); October 22, 2024 (print)	979-8-88843-777-3
1. "The Lady's Parting Gift"; 2. "The Lady's Moratorium"; 3. "The Young Lady, the Television, and the Movie Director"; 4. "The Lady Spectates"; 5. "March 20"; 6. "Various News Excerpts"; 7. "The Lady's Supporting Roles"; 8. Interlude: "Keika Railway Part 57"; 9. "The Villainess Meets the Fortune Teller"; 10. "The Queen Bee's Tea Party"
6	August 25, 2024	978-4-8240-0921-0	April 10, 2025 (digital); May 20, 2025 (print)	979-8-89373-302-0
1. "The Daily Lives of Keika Group Office Workers"; 2. "The Final Chapter of Bad Debt Disposal"; 3. "The First Time's a Tragedy; the Second Time's a Comedy"; 4. "The Young Lady's Friends and Their Decisions"; 5. "The Young Lady's Daily Life and the Shark Movie"; 6. "Failed Terrorism Outside Narita Airport"; 7. "Failed Terrorism Outside Narita Airport: The Aftermath"; 8. "The Young Lady's Harassment"; 9. "The Young Lady's Wastefulness"; 10. "Somewhere in Europe"
7	April 25, 2025	978-4-8240-1158-9	August 6, 2026 (digital); September 8, 2026 (print)	979-8-89561-693-2
1. "The Overnight Broadcast and the Country's Post-Election Path"; 2. "Imperial Gakushuukan Academy's Seven Wonders: The Vanity Mirror in the Concert Hall and the Chain Love Letters"; 3. "The Young Lady Versus the Scavengers"; 4. "The Young Lady's Daily Life: Autumn 2003"; 5. "The Young Lady's Imoni Party"; 6. "Imperial Gakushuukan Academy's Seven Wonders: The Zashiki Warashi of the Dormitories"; 7. "Professor Kanbe's Grown-Up Sociology Classes"; 8. "School Festival: Junior High Edition"; 9. "The Police Officers' Banquet"; 10. "Giving Thanks to the Fox God"; 11. "Side Story: The Failure of the Young Lady's Escort Mission"; 12. "A Few Article Excerpts"; 13. "The End of the Old Man's Delusions"
8	February 25, 2026	978-4-8240-1530-3	June 29, 2027 (print)	979-8-89863-984-6

=== Manga ===
A manga adaptation illustrated by Data began serialization on Overlap's Comic Gardo website on December 9, 2022. The manga's chapters have been collected in four tankōbon volumes as of February 2026.

In December 2025, Titan Comics announced that they had licensed the manga for English publication, with the first volume set to release in December 2026.

No.	Original release date	Original ISBN	English release date	English ISBN
1	April 25, 2023	978-4-8240-0475-8	December 8, 2026	978-1-78774-919-1
2	January 25, 2024	978-4-8240-0717-9	February 2, 2027	978-1-78774-920-7
3	August 25, 2024	978-4-8240-0930-2	—	—
4	February 25, 2026	978-4-8240-1539-6	—	—

== Reception ==
The series was ranked seventh overall at the 2021 Next Light Novel Awards. The series was ranked eighth in the tankōbon category of the 2022 edition of Takarajimasha's Kono Light Novel ga Sugoi! guidebook.
