= Maigo ni Natteita Yōjo o Tasuketara =

Japanese light novel series

- Maigo ni Natteita Yōjo o Tasuketara, Otonari ni Sumu Bishōjo Ryūgakusei ga Ie ni Asobi ni Kuru yō ni Natta Ken ni Tsuite
- First light novel volume cover

迷子になっていた幼女を助けたら、お隣に住む美少女留学生が家に遊びに来るようになった件について
- Genre: Romantic comedy
- Novel series
- Written by: Nekokuro
- Published by: Shōsetsuka ni Narō
- Original run: November 26, 2019 – present
- Light novel
- Written by: Nekokuro
- Illustrated by: You Midorikawa
- Published by: Shueisha
- Imprint: Dash X Bunko
- Original run: February 25, 2022 – present
- Volumes: 8
- Manga
- Written by: Nekokuro
- Illustrated by: Pentagon
- Published by: Shueisha
- Imprint: Young Jump Comics
- Magazine: Dash X Comic
- Original run: May 17, 2024 – present
- Volumes: 5

Maigo ni Natteita Yōjo o Tasuketara, Otonari ni Sumu Bishōjo Ryūgakusei ga Ie ni Asobi ni Kuru yō ni Natta Ken ni Tsuite (迷子になっていた幼女を助けたら、お隣に住む美少女留学生が家に遊びに来るようになった件について; lit. 'The Story of How a Beautiful Foreign Student Who Lives Next Door Started to Visit My House After I Helped a Lost Little Girl'), shortened as Otonari Asobi (お隣遊び), is a Japanese light novel series written by Nekokuro and illustrated by You Midorikawa. It began serialization on the user-generated novel publishing website Shōsetsuka ni Narō in November 2019. It was later acquired by Shueisha who began publishing it under their Dash X Bunko imprint in February 2022. A manga adaptation illustrated by Pentagon began serialization on the Nico Nico Seiga website under Shueisha's Dash X Comic brand in May 2024.

== Plot ==
Akihito Aoyagi, a high school student, has his quiet routine disrupted when Charlotte Bennett, an elegant and innocent exchange student, transfers into his class. Though Charlotte quickly becomes popular, Akihito keeps his distance, feeling that she belongs to a different world. His daily life changes when he helps Charlotte's younger sister, Emma, after she gets lost, leading him to discover that the Bennett sisters live in the neighboring apartment.

Afterward, Emma grows attached to Akihito, and Charlotte and Emma begin visiting his room regularly, spending time together through simple activities like sharing meals, playing games, and going out. Through these everyday interactions, Akihito and Charlotte gradually grow closer despite their mutual awkwardness.

== Media ==
=== Light novel ===
Written by Nekokuro, Maigo ni Natteita Yōjo o Tasuketara, Otonari ni Sumu Bishōjo Ryūgakusei ga Ie ni Asobi ni Kuru yō ni Natta Ken ni Tsuite began serialization on the user-generated novel publishing website Shōsetsuka ni Narō on November 26, 2019. It was later acquired by Shueisha who began publishing it with illustrations by You Midorikawa under its Dash X Bunko imprint on February 25, 2022. Eight volumes have been published as of February 20, 2026.

No.	Release date	ISBN
1	February 25, 2022	978-4-08-631458-9
2	July 22, 2022	978-4-08-631477-0
3	December 23, 2022	978-4-08-631495-4
4	April 25, 2023	978-4-08-631506-7
5	October 25, 2023	978-4-08-631525-8
6	March 25, 2024	978-4-08-631544-9
7	December 25, 2024	978-4-08-631579-1
8	February 20, 2026	978-4-08-631644-6

=== Manga ===
A manga adaptation illustrated by Pentagon began serialization on the Nico Nico Seiga website under Shueisha's Dash X Comic brand on May 17, 2024. The manga's chapters have been compiled into five tankōbon volumes as of September 2026.

No.	Release date	ISBN
1	December 18, 2024	978-4-08-893508-9
2	May 19, 2025	978-4-08-893719-9
3	November 19, 2025	978-4-08-894012-0
4	March 18, 2026	978-4-08-894124-0
5	September 17, 2026	978-4-08-894337-4

== Reception ==
The series won the silver award at the 2nd Shueisha Web Novel Award in 2021.

By December 2024, the series had over 140,000 copies in circulation.
