= An Introvert's Hookup Hiccups =

Japanese light novel series

- An Introvert's Hookup Hiccups: This Gyaru Is Head Over Heels for Me!
- First light novel volume cover

陰キャの僕に罰ゲームで告白してきたはずのギャルが、どう見ても僕にベタ惚れです (Inkya no Boku ni Batsu Gēmu de Kokuhaku Shite Kita Hazu no Gyaru ga, Dō Mitemo Boku ni Beta Bore desu)
- Genre: Romantic comedy
- Novel series
- Written by: Yuishi
- Published by: Shōsetsuka ni Narō; Novel Up Plus
- Original run: March 7, 2020 – December 31, 2021
- Light novel
- Written by: Yuishi
- Illustrated by: Saku Kagachi
- Published by: Hobby Japan
- English publisher: NA: J-Novel Club
- Imprint: HJ Bunko
- Original run: December 1, 2021 – present
- Volumes: 14
- Manga
- Written by: Yuishi
- Illustrated by: Nagomi Kanna
- Published by: Kadokawa Shoten
- Imprint: Kadokawa Comics A
- Magazine: Shōnen Ace Plus
- Original run: June 17, 2022 – present
- Volumes: 6

An Introvert's Hookup Hiccups: This Gyaru Is Head Over Heels for Me! (Japanese: 陰キャの僕に罰ゲームで告白してきたはずのギャルが、どう見ても僕にベタ惚れです, Hepburn: Inkya no Boku ni Batsu Gēmu de Kokuhaku Shite Kita Hazu no Gyaru ga, Dō Mitemo Boku ni Beta Bore desu; lit. 'The Gal Who Was Meant to Confess to Me as a Game Punishment Has Apparently Fallen in Love With Me') is a Japanese light novel series written by Yuishi and illustrated by Saku Kagachi. It began as a web novel series posted on the web novel sites Shōsetsuka ni Narō and Novel Up Plus between March 2020 and December 2021. Hobby Japan began publishing it in print under their HJ Bunko imprint, with the first volume being released in December 2021. Fourteen volumes have been published as of July 2026. A manga adaptation illustrated by Nagomi Kanna began serialization on Kadokawa Shoten's Shōnen Ace Plus website in June 2022, with the series being compiled into six volumes as of March 2026.

== Plot ==
The series follows Yōshin Misumai, a loner and quiet student in class who has no friends. One day, Nanami Barato, a popular gyaru, confesses to him after losing a punishment game. As part of the punishment, she is to confess to Yōshin, and if she succeeds, they would be in a relationship for a month. Knowing of the plan, Yōshin initially hesitates but decides to go along, knowing that the relationship would only be for a month. However, he soon realizes that Nanami has genuinely developed feelings for him.

== Characters ==
Yōshin Misumai (簾舞 陽信, Misumai Yōshin)
The protagonist, Yōshin has no friends in class due to his introverted personality, instead focusing on hobbies like playing mobile games. Contrary to this, he is mildly buff due to working out too. He is hesitant to accept Nanami's confession, but goes along with the punishment game after seeking advice from his online friends. Gradually, Yōshin falls in love with Nanami; finding her to be much sweeter and innocent than her style suggests.
Yōshin worries that Nanami will still dump him by the end of the month, despite her obvious devotion to him. Even with his fears, Yōshin defends Nanami multiple times from those interfering with their relationship.
Nanami Barato (茨戸 七海, Barato Nanami)
Voiced by: Reina Ueda (PV)
A gyaru who is a popular student but has also developed a reputation for rejecting multiple confessions; due to being objectified by boys, Nanami has trust issues. After losing a punishment game, she is forced to confess to Yōshin, who was chosen by her friends owing to his unpopularity and his introvert nature. He showed her respect and saved Nanami from being hit by a bucket dropped from the second floor. Nanami wears contacts typically, looking like a different person in glasses.
Despite how their relationship started, Nanami genuinely falls in love with Yōshin and feels guilty, unaware he knows of the punishment game and thinks she's just playing things up. Her mother encourages Nanami to confess at the end of the month.

== Media ==
=== Light novel ===
An Introvert's Hookup Hiccups: This Gyaru Is Head Over Heels for Me! initially began as a web novel series posted on the online publishing sites Shōsetsuka ni Narō and Novel Up Plus. Chapters were posted between March and September 2020, with extra chapters being posted afterwards until October 2021. It was later acquired by Hobby Japan, which began publishing it as a light novel series under their HJ Bunko imprint on December 1, 2021. A promotional video featuring narration by Reina Ueda was posted on the official Hobby Japan YouTube account in September 2022 to promote the release of the fourth volume. Fourteen volumes have been published as of July 2026. The series is licensed in English by J-Novel Club.

No.	Original release date	Original ISBN	English release date	English ISBN
1	December 1, 2021	978-4-7986-2678-9	December 5, 2022	978-1-71-835548-4
2	February 1, 2022	978-4-7986-2719-9	March 6, 2023	978-1-71-835550-7
3	April 30, 2022	978-4-7986-2830-1	June 20, 2023	978-1-71-835552-1
4	September 1, 2022	978-4-7986-2918-6	September 28, 2023	978-1-71-835554-5
5	December 28, 2022	978-4-7986-3039-7	January 11, 2024	978-1-71-835556-9
6	June 1, 2023	978-4-7986-3190-5	March 28, 2024	978-1-71-835558-3
7	September 29, 2023	978-4-7986-3309-1	June 27, 2024	978-1-71-835560-6
8	March 1, 2024	978-4-7986-3454-8	October 3, 2024	978-1-71-835562-0
9	July 1, 2024	978-4-7986-3583-5	December 26, 2024	978-1-71-835564-4
10	November 29, 2024	978-4-7986-3691-7	June 2, 2025	978-1-71-835566-8
11	April 1, 2025	978-4-7986-3822-5	October 6, 2025	978-1-71-835568-2
12	September 1, 2025	978-4-7986-3957-4	February 26, 2026	978-1-71-835570-5
13	January 30, 2026	978-4-7986-4083-9	August 10, 2026	978-1-71-835572-9
14	July 31, 2026	978-4-7986-4237-6	—	—

=== Manga ===
A manga adaptation illustrated by Nagomi Kanna began serialization on Kadokawa Shoten's Shōnen Ace Plus manga service on June 17, 2022. It has been compiled into six tankōbon volumes as of March 2026.

No.	Japanese release date	Japanese ISBN
1	February 25, 2023	978-4-04-113428-3
2	August 25, 2023	978-4-04-114026-0
3	March 26, 2024	978-4-04-114665-1
4	December 25, 2024	978-4-04-115589-9
5	September 26, 2025	978-4-04-116408-2
6	March 26, 2026	978-4-04-117257-5
