= Kajidaikō no Arubaito o Hajimetara Gakuen Ichi no Bishōjo no Kazoku ni Kiniirarechaimashita =

Japanese light novel series

- First light novel volume cover

家事代行のアルバイトを始めたら学園一の美少女の家族に気に入られちゃいました。
- Genre: Romantic comedy
- Novel series
- Written by: Shiohon
- Published by: Shōsetsuka ni Narō
- Original run: May 22, 2023 – present
- Light novel
- Written by: Shiohon
- Illustrated by: Ell Akino
- Published by: SB Creative
- Imprint: GA Bunko
- Original run: April 14, 2024 – present
- Volumes: 6
- Manga
- Written by: Shiohon
- Illustrated by: Urua
- Published by: ASCII Media Works
- Imprint: Dengeki Comics NEXT
- Magazine: Dengeki Daioh
- Original run: September 27, 2024 – present
- Volumes: 2

Kajidaikō no Arubaito o Hajimetara Gakuen Ichi no Bishōjo no Kazoku ni Kiniirarechaimashita (家事代行のアルバイトを始めたら学園一の美少女の家族に気に入られちゃいました。; lit. 'When I Started a Housekeeping Part-Time Job, I Ended Up Being Liked by the Family of the Most Beautiful Girl in School') is a Japanese light novel series written by Shiohon and illustrated by Ell Akino. It was originally serialized as a web novel on the web service Shōsetsuka ni Narō beginning in May 2023, before beginning publication as a light novel under SB Creative's GA Bunko imprint in April 2024. Six volumes have been released as of June 2026. A manga adaptation illustrated by Urua began serialization in ASCII Media Works' Dengeki Daioh magazine in September 2024 and has been compiled into two tankōbon volumes as of March 2026.

== Plot ==
The series follows Haruto Ōtsuki, a second-year high school student, who takes up a part-time housekeeping job during summer vacation. As it turned out, his client is the family of Ayaka Tōjō, the most beautiful and popular girl in school. As Haruto does his work for the Tōjō family, Ayaka and her younger brother Ryōta become more attached to him. Haruto and Ayaka end up going out frequently, later developing feelings for each other.

== Characters ==
Haruto Ōtsuki (大槻 晴翔, Ōtsuki Haruto)
A second-year high school student and the smartest one in class. His parents were killed in a car accident when he was young, leaving him in the care of his grandmother. Despite his best friend Tomoya's urging, he focuses more on part-time work and studying than other activities. He becomes a housekeeper for the Tōjō family, cleanung up after Ayaka's mess.
Ayaka Tōjō (東條 綾香, Tōjō Ayaka)
Haruto's classmate and the most beautiful and popular girl in school. Despite her reputation, she is a slob at home, unable to clean up her belongings or the house. She and Haruto had never talked to each other before the Tōjō family hired him, but over time the two get closer together. Her parents are both company executives.
Tomoya Akagi (赤城 友哉, Akagi Tomoya)
Haruto's classmate and best friend. He plays the guitar and is wasteful with his money.
Ryōta Tōjō (東條 涼太, Tōjō Ryōta)
Ayaka's younger brother, who becomes attached to Haruto whenever he visits.
Saki Aizawa (藍沢 咲, Aizawa Saki)
Ayaka's childhood friend and classmate. Ayaka often seeks her advice regarding life and love.
Shizuku Dōjima (堂島 雫, Dōjima Shizuku)
Haruto's childhood friend. She is a first-year student and Haruto's junior at the karate dojo he helps out with.

== Media ==
=== Light novel ===
The series is written by Shiohon, who originally began posting it as a web novel on the online publication platform Shōsetsuka ni Narō on May 22, 2023. It was later picked up for publication by SB Creative, which began publishing it as a light novel under their GA Bunko imprint on April 14, 2024. Six volumes have been published as of June 2026.

No.	Japanese release date	Japanese ISBN
1	April 14, 2024	978-4-8156-2412-5
2	August 9, 2024	978-4-8156-2413-2
3	January 12, 2025	978-4-8156-2935-9
4	June 14, 2025	978-4-8156-3189-5
5	November 15, 2025	978-4-8156-3575-6
6	June 13, 2026	978-4-8156-3805-4

=== Manga ===
A manga adaptation was announced in April 2024. It is illustrated by Urua and began serialization in ASCII Media Works' Dengeki Daioh magazine on September 27, 2024. The first tankōbon volume was released on July 26, 2025; two volumes have been released as of March 2026.

No.	Japanese release date	Japanese ISBN
1	July 26, 2025	978-4-04-916485-5
2	March 27, 2026	978-4-04-952164-1
