= I'm a Noble on the Brink of Ruin, So I Might as Well Try Mastering Magic =

Japanese light novel series

- First light novel volume cover

没落予定の貴族だけど、暇だったから魔法を極めてみた (Botsuraku Yotei no Kizoku dakedo, Hima datta kara Mahō o Kiwamete Mita)
- Genre: Fantasy, harem, isekai
- Novel series
- Written by: Nazuna Miki
- Published by: Shōsetsuka ni Narō
- Original run: September 7, 2019 – present
- Light novel
- Written by: Nazuna Miki
- Illustrated by: Kabocha
- Published by: TO Books
- English publisher: NA: J-Novel Club
- Imprint: TO Bunko
- Original run: February 10, 2020 – present
- Volumes: 11
- Manga
- Written by: Nazuna Miki
- Illustrated by: Rio Akisaki
- Published by: TO Books
- English publisher: NA: J-Novel Club
- Imprint: Corona Comics
- Magazine: Comic Corona
- Original run: February 3, 2020 – present
- Volumes: 12
- Manga

Goshujin-sama ga Daisuki
- Written by: Nazuna Miki
- Illustrated by: Daiki Tose
- Published by: TO Books
- Imprint: Corona Comics
- Magazine: Corona EX
- Original run: September 14, 2023 – November 28, 2024
- Volumes: 1
- Anime television series
- Directed by: Kenichi Ishikura
- Produced by: Kai Minegishi; Tomoko Kage; Hikaru Honda; Masahiko Nagano; Fumi Miura; Yutaka Suwa; Masaharu Kado; Miho Kikuchi; Hikari Kuratani
- Written by: Tatsuya Takahashi
- Music by: Arisa Okehazama
- Studio: Studio Deen; Marvy Jack (Note: Animation production assistance (アニメーション制作協力) for all episodes provided by Ekachi Epilka.)
- Licensed by: Crunchyroll
- Original network: TV Tokyo, AT-X, BS Fuji, TUF, WTV, TUY
- Original run: January 7, 2025 – March 25, 2025
- Episodes: 12

I'm a Noble on the Brink of Ruin, So I Might as Well Try Mastering Magic (没落予定の貴族だけど、暇だったから魔法を極めてみた, Botsuraku Yotei no Kizoku dakedo, Hima datta kara Mahō o Kiwamete Mita) is a Japanese light novel series written by Nazuna Miki and illustrated by Kabocha. It began serialization online in September 2019 on the user-generated novel publishing website Shōsetsuka ni Narō. It was later acquired by TO Books, who have published eleven volumes since February 2020. A manga adaptation with art by Rio Akisaki has been serialized online via TO Books' Nico Nico Seiga-based Comic Corona manga service since February 2020 and has been collected in twelve tankōbon volumes. An anime television series adaptation produced by Studio Deen and Marvy Jack aired from January to March 2025.

== Premise ==
While enjoying an evening drink, a man woke up to find he had become Liam Hamilton; fifth son of a nobleman in another world. Due to their kingdom's law of nobility saying that a family loses their status if every three generations haven't accomplish anything noteworthy, Liam prepares to study magic; creating backup plans for the eventual possibility of life as a commoner.

While determined to be an adventurer, Liam becomes involved with secrets of the land lost to time; slowly rising in fame to status he never hopes to achieve and becomes the land's king. In time, nearby kingdoms desire to ally with him or seize control of his land for their own means.

== Characters ==
Liam Hamilton (リアム, Riamu)
Voiced by: Ayumu Murase
A man who has awakened in another world as the fifth son of a noble. While unsure how he ended up in this world, Liam decided to learn magic in order to care for himself. This leads to have mastery over multi-casting magic and finding the lost Promised Land, which he is recognized as the ruler; he later names his kingdom Liam;Radon per suggestion.
He can evolve magical beings by naming them, but Liam cannot use the same name twice. He is also able to clone himself with a Summons spell, can form contracts with others as his familiars, and create a pocket dimension that he can enter freely, but others require his permission to enter.
Radon (ラードーン, Rādōn)
Voiced by: Tomokazu Sugita (Dragon form), Rie Kugimiya (Human form)
Known as the Evil Dragon, who guarded the Promised Land. She was set free by Albrevit with the intent of slaying her and becoming famous, but she was too strong for him. She has taken to inhabiting Liam after seeing him worthy of her power. Radon is often consulted by Liam due to various troubles; she will often nudge Liam to think of new magics to solve issues.
Her kin are all female and asexually reproduce with magic, making the Radon Jrs truly her children. They can also alter their age via rebirth; Radon herself can take the form of a female middle schooler. It is implied she was the one behind Liam's reincarnation, as he met Radon in her young girl form prior to becoming Liam.
Asuna Aquage (アスナ)
Voiced by: Haruka Tomatsu
One of Liam's party members. She is a swordswoman, who is bright and aggressive; Liam's type of woman. She may have feelings for Liam.
Asuna is the first to be contracted to Liam as a familiar, giving her greater strength and enhanced beauty.
Jodi (ジョディ)
Voiced by: Saori Hayami
One of Liam's party members. She has the unique skill of healing, with which she is also capable of enchanting food. For combat, she is a long distance fighter with a bow and arrow. Like Asuna, she also may have feelings for Liam.
Jodi is the second to be contracted to Liam. She was a fairly pretty middle-aged woman before; though the contract restored her youth.
Scarlet Sherry Jamil (スカーレット, Sukāretto)
Voiced by: Shizuka Itō
Princess of the Jamil kingdom. Scarlet gave Liam permission to turn Radon's Promised Land into a new country. She often converses with Liam over the international issues with founding a new nation; providing him with the know-how to be a ruler. She is eventually given special armor that grants her the power to use magic, which is named Ares. She is the fifth to be contracted to Liam and becomes both a servant and potential lover to him.
According to Radon, Scarlet is her descendant; having been the first monarch. Explaining why Scarlet can use armor created by Radon.
Raymond (レイモンド, Reimondo)
Voiced by: Takehito Koyasu
Liam's magic mentor, who taught him how to avoid using chanting; plus that some people can only use specific numbered spells, skipping a number. He gave Liam his ring, which houses his elemental familiars.
Bruno Hamilton (ブルーノ, Burūno)
Voiced by: Yūya Hirose
Liam's brother, who is also a lower ranked son; the fourth. He wants to enjoy his life as he doesn't have obligations. He is later happily arranged to marry into another family. Unlike Albrevit, he bears no jealousy of Liam.
Albrevit Hamilton (アルブレビト, Aruburebito)
Voiced by: Ryuichi Kijima
The eldest sibling. He is very stuck-up and desperately wants to make an accomplishment to keep his family's noble title. However, Albrevit slowly starts going mad with envy after seeing Liam master magic; thinking he wants to succeed their father.
Albrevit released Radon's seal in a stupid plan to slay her and gain fame, but the dragon was too powerful for him and he is placed under house arrest as punishment for his reckless actions.
Reina (レイナ)
Voiced by: Yume Miyamoto
Originally one of the pixies who worshiped Radon. She evolved into an elf after being named via familiar contract with Liam, making her Liam's third familiar. She is in charge of his village in Radon's land.
Reina does not tolerate rude, lascivious men; making it clear that she and the other elves can kill in self-defense at any time.
Chris (クリス, Kurisu)
Voiced by: Miho Okasaki
Originally a werewolf follower of Radon; she evolved into a beastkin after being named by Liam and is his fourth familiar. She appears to have feelings for Liam.
The adventurers guild has a high bounty out on Chris from defeating would-be invaders, due to Liam's kingdom not being officially recognized.
Guy (ガイ, Gai)
Voiced by: Kenta Miyake
Leader of the ogres; after evolving into a Giga, he shrunk to a more human form after being named and becoming Liam's sixth familiar. He is a sparring buddy of Chris, helping to defend their land.
Amelia, Emilia, and Claudia
Liam's unseen familiars, who help him cast magic. Liam once imbued Amelia into an illusionary female clone of himself.
Golak
A dwarf engineer. Liam uses summoning magic to create a copy of him when he needs an expert.
Ifrit
A fire salamander that evolves into a stronger form thanks to Liam. He is one of Liam's summoned beasts.
Shade
A darkness spirit and one of Liam's summoned beasts, used to create a nighttime atmosphere in Liam's pocket dimension. After evolving Shade, it can now create natural darkness.
Leonardo Berkeley
A noble from the kingdom of Jamil. He is familiar with Scarlet.
Celsius Zero
A water spirit that Liam evolves and forms a contract with, making her his eighth familiar. Liam has her possess a magical battle armor to strengthen it.
Mina, Natasha, and Nia
Former pixies who evolved into elves alongside Reina and the other pixies-turned-elves.
Gon
A troll who evolved into a Giga alongside his kind.
Dracula
The leader of a horde of vampires. After being trapped in Liam's Dust Box, it was forced into hibernation permanently and soon dies.
Alucard
A vampire who evolved into a Noble Vampire alongside his kind. Following the Dracula's defeat, he moves into the Promised Land. He is Liam's ninth familiar.
Slilun and Slipon
Two slimes who have evolved into Slime Dos. They live in the Promised Land.
Flora
The illegitimate daughter of Palta's king, who is implanted with a curse that will slowly turn her into a monster. Despite her status, she is not actually a princess. She was used as a victim in her father's plan to invade the Promised Land, but Liam prevents her death and removes her curse, inviting her to live in the Promised Land after that. She later becomes Liam's tenth familiar and learns how to cast magic.
Ex Blast
A representative of Palta's king. He tried to kill Flora to make Liam appear to be a murderer to allow Palta to invade the Promised Land, but Liam foils this ploy and he had to escape.
Sheila
A princess from Quistador. She is a strong fighter and is capable of using superspeed.

== Media ==
=== Light novel ===
Written by Nazuna Miki, I'm a Noble on the Brink of Ruin, So I Might as Well Try Mastering Magic began serialization on the user-generated novel publishing website Shōsetsuka ni Narō on September 7, 2019. It was later acquired by TO Books who began publishing the series with illustrations by Kabocha under their TO Bunko light novel imprint on February 10, 2020. Eleven volumes have been released as of April 2025. The light novel is licensed in North America by J-Novel Club.

No.	Original release date	Original ISBN	North American release date	North American ISBN
1	February 10, 2020	978-4-86-472921-5	April 4, 2024	978-1-71-837967-1
2	May 9, 2020	978-4-86-472981-9	July 5, 2024	978-1-71-837969-5
3	August 8, 2020	978-4-86-699030-9	September 13, 2024	978-1-71-837971-8
4	November 20, 2020	978-4-86-699084-2	November 23, 2024	978-1-71-837973-2
5	July 20, 2021	978-4-86-699274-7	January 30, 2025	978-1-71-837975-6
6	July 9, 2022	978-4-86-699566-3	April 24, 2025	978-1-71-837977-0
7	September 20, 2023	978-4-86-699949-4	November 7, 2025	978-1-71-837979-4
8	March 15, 2024	978-4-86-794120-1	January 19, 2026	978-1-71-837981-7
9	October 19, 2024	978-4-86-794342-7	April 13, 2026	978-1-71-837983-1
10	January 15, 2025	978-4-86-794430-1	June 29, 2026	978-1-71-837985-5
11	April 19, 2025	978-4-86-794548-3	September 8, 2026	978-1-71-837987-9

=== Manga ===
A manga adaptation illustrated by Rio Akisaki began serialization on TO Books' Nico Nico Seiga-based manga service Comic Corona on February 3, 2020. The manga's chapters have been compiled into thirteen tankōbon volumes as of October 2026. The manga adaptation is also licensed in North America by J-Novel Club.

A spin-off manga illustrated by Daiki Tose, titled Botsuraku Yotei no Kizoku dakedo, Hima datta kara Mahō wo Kiwamete Mita: Goshujin-sama ga Daisuki, was serialized on TO Books' Corona EX manga service from September 14, 2023, to November 28, 2024. Its chapters were collected into a single tankōbon volume released on January 15, 2025.

No.	Original release date	Original ISBN	North American release date	North American ISBN
1	September 1, 2020	978-4-86-699043-9	May 22, 2024	978-1-71-839332-5
2	February 15, 2021	978-4-86-699131-3	November 6, 2024	978-1-71-839333-2
3	August 16, 2021	978-4-86-699301-0	July 16, 2025	978-1-71-839334-9
4	March 1, 2022	978-4-86-699464-2	September 24, 2025	978-1-71-839335-6
5	August 16, 2022	978-4-86-699645-5	December 3, 2025	978-1-71-839336-3
6	March 1, 2023	978-4-86-699793-3	February 11, 2026	978-1-71-839337-0
7	September 15, 2023	978-4-86-699945-6	May 6, 2026	978-1-71-839338-7
8	March 15, 2024	978-4-86-794112-6	August 12, 2026	978-1-71-839339-4
9	January 15, 2025	978-4-86-794408-0	November 4, 2026	978-1-71-839340-0
10	February 15, 2025	978-4-86-794456-1	January 1, 2027	—
11	September 15, 2025	978-4-86-794699-2	—	—
12	March 15, 2026	978-4-86-794910-8	—	—
13	October 15, 2026	978-4-86-854160-8	—	—

==== Goshujin-sama ga Daisuki ====
No.	Original release date	Original ISBN	North American release date	North American ISBN
1	January 15, 2025	978-4-86-794409-7	—	—

=== Anime ===
An anime television series adaptation was announced in March 2024. It is produced by Studio Deen and Marvy Jack, and directed by Kenichi Ishikura, with Tatsuya Takahashi writing series scripts, Midori Otsuka designing the characters, and Arisa Okehazama composing the music. The series aired from January 7 to March 25, 2025, on TV Tokyo and other networks. (Note: TV Tokyo lists the series premiere on January 6, 2025, at 25:30, which is effectively January 7 at 1:30 a.m. JST.) The opening theme song is "Wonderlust", performed by Saji, while the ending theme song is "Joy!!", performed by Miho Okasaki. Crunchyroll streamed the series.

==== Episodes ====
No.	Title	Directed by	Written by	Storyboarded by	Original release date
1	"Liam Tries Using Magic For the First Time"; Transliteration: "Riamu, Hajimete Mahō o Tsukatte Mita" (Japanese: リアム、初めて魔法を使ってみた)	Yoshinobu Kasai	Tatsuya Takahashi	Kenichi Ishikura	January 7, 2025
An unnamed salaryman awakens in another world as Liam, 5th son of Count Hamilton, who now has a younger sister. Liam accepts his new life, but learns from his elder brother Bruno, the 4th son, that noble families only stay noble by accomplishing great deeds at least once every three generations. The Hamilton's deadline is approaching and they will soon be demoted to commoners. Liam discovers he can use magic and his father hopes Liam might save the family's noble status. Liam encounters a stranger who shows him shortcuts to improve his magic. Impressed with Liam's talent, the stranger gives him a ring containing knowledge of 300 spells, but then disappears. Liam improves enough to use five spells at once. Bruno reveals he is getting married, since he has resigned himself to the Hamilton's losing their status. He also advises Liam to find ways to support himself financially. Using magic Liam invents several products, including instant noodles, but is prevented from selling them by Albrevit, the 1st son and his oldest brother, fearing Liam is trying to replace him as heir. Liam decides to circumvent this by summoning a clone of himself to trade with businesses outside Hamilton lands. Using a two way teleportation spell and a storage spell, Liam is able to send Clone-Liam the products and receive money in return without Albrevit finding out.
2	"Liam Tries Becoming an Adventurer"; Transliteration: "Riamu, Bōkensha ni Natte Mita" (Japanese: リアム、冒険者になってみた)	Yusuke Onoda	Yamada Hana	Hiroyuki Shimazu	January 14, 2025 (Note: From Episode 2 onwards, episodes are released on U-NEXT, Anime Hōdai and Crunchyroll a week before their televised airings.)
Albrevit sends Liam join the Hunter's Guild after Liam tells him that he wishes to be independent. The guildmaster is doubtful of Liam at first, but he impresses him with his magic and is allowed to join. A girl named Asuna joins Liam as a party member and they gain fame hunting monsters. The noble James Stanley visits and interrogates Liam about his ring, which belongs to a mischievous but important man named Raymond, who was the stranger from earlier. Liam tells James everything, who is impressed and grants Liam a knighthood. Liam recalls Raymond hiding 100kg of gold dust in a lake as a gift. James is amused and reveals it was meant as a test to find his real gift. Liam removes the water from the lake whilst returning the gold and finds a Grimoire for the spell Another World hidden in a secret passage under the lake, granting him a large storage space in another dimension that he can enter while others can only enter with his permission. Liam's skills improve and Asuna fears being left behind. The guildmaster suggests that Asuna should become Liam's familiar so her skills can increase. Asuna agrees and gains the skill Speedster, allowing her to move incredibly fast. Asuna recommends veteran hunter Jodie as a second familiar. Jodie gains a skill that applies healing magic to food and makes her a teenager again. James reveals Princess Scarlet wishes to visit, having taken an interest in his familiars. Liam refuses to put Asuna or Jodie on display to amuse a bored princess. After Liam leaves, it is revealed James' maid was actually Scarlet in disguise, now even more interested in him.
3	"Liam Tries Talking to a Dragon Fiend"; Transliteration: "Riamu, Maryū to Hanashite Mita" (Japanese: リアム、魔竜と話してみた)	Kanta Shiba	Shōta Gotō	Hiroyuki Shimazu	January 21, 2025
Scarlet gifts Liam a Grimoire on familiars and promotes him to Baron; an even higher status than his father. Bruno is impressed, but a jealous Albrevit decides to prove himself superior to Liam and frees the dragon Radon, sealed on Hamilton land by his great-grandfather, and attempts to slay her to gain fame. However, it is too powerful for him to beat, though he still refuses to give up. After knocking out Albervit and sending him home, the guildmaster reveals it is possible to seal Radon again, but Liam must recover Radon's three dragon children set loose in the forest or the seal won't work. Liam manages to trap the three infants in his Other World. As a group of magicians attempt to imprison Radon again, he is impressed at the strength of Liam's soul and asks to accompany Liam so he can witness his accomplishments. Liam agrees and Radon settles inside Liam's soul, boosting his power so Liam can cast 17 spells at once. Liam then gifts the guildmaster with the gold he found earlier. Albrevit is placed under house arrest for his foolish actions. Liam finds joining with Radon has added two spells to his ring, one a more advanced version of Other World, and one which allows him to summon Radon's children. Scarlet realizes the latter is a Holy Spell, which are very rare. For dealing with Radon, Scarlet awards him the Order of the Phoenix, Third Class, and 3000 gold coins, but also demands he keep Radon's location inside his soul a secret to not cause panic.
4	"Liam Tries Taking an Elf Familiar"; Transliteration: "Riamu, Erufu o Tsukaima ni Shite Mita" (Japanese: リアム、エルフを使い魔にしてみた)	Masahiko Watanabe	Tatsuya Takahashi	Shinichi Watanabe	January 28, 2025
James tells Liam of a dragon who fused his soul to a young woman who eventually established the kingdom. If Radon was that same dragon, and it was the Hamilton's who sealed him, then it would be a crime beyond forgiveness. James declares Liam fusing with Radon is the greatest achievement in history, although he becomes too popular for his own good. Liam shows Asuna and Jodie his improved Other World is capable of storing a house as a mobile living space. He summons a shade spirit and evolves it so that it can create a nighttime atmosphere in the pocket dimension. He then evolves a fire spirit salamander that he also summoned into a more powerful form, who then names itself Ifrit. At Radon's request, Liam begins protecting a clan of pixies, who are at first fearful of him until he shows them one of Radon's children, and evolves them into elves and gives them names. In turn, they become Liam's familiars and decide to build a village. Reina, one of the elves, is assigned to be their leader. After eating a magical fruit, he is given the power to cast 19 spells at once. The next day, Liam learns that the elves don't know how to build. Thugs then try to kidnap the elves, but are stopped by Liam, who has them take refuge in his pocket dimension so Liam can move them to lands that Radon once protected using a new teleportation spell, and the elves request for Lima to be their leader. After Liam has a water spirit provide water for the surrounding area, he leaves Radon's children to protect the elves as he goes to see Scarlet, who believes the elves' new home is actually a lost area known as the Promised Land. In exchange for Liam making a clone of Golak, a dwarven engineer to build the elves village for them, Scarlet is granted permission to visit the elves. With a ring belonging to the royal family, Scarlet causes an entire island of land to rise into the air, confirming the elves new home is the Promised Land, said to be the salvation of humanity after a catastrophe in the future. Scarlet declares Liam master of the Promised Lands and charges him with building a kingdom there for the elves and for the future salvation of humanity.
5	"Liam Tries to Get Engaged to the Princess"; Transliteration: "Riamu, Ōjo-sama to Konyaku Shite Mita" (Japanese: リアム、王女様と婚約してみた)	Fumio Maezono	Kana Yamada	Hiroshi Matsuzono	February 4, 2025
As a village is being built on the Promised Land, Liam helps clear away dangerous monsters. Scarlet becomes attracted to Liam and decides to become his servant to serve Radon. They discover ruins containing a metal dragon that resembles Radon, which they tame. Scarlet stays to watch over the dragon while Liam heads back to the village, only to find it being attacked by wolfmen, who do not approve of outsiders. After Liam defeats the leader, he shows them Radon's children to prove that they are allied with Radon. It turns out the wolfmen also work for Radon guarding the Promised Land. Realizing their mistake, the wolfmen swear loyalty to Liam and he names the leader Chris, who is actually female as she and her kind evolve into beastkin. As they rebuild the village, Radon advices Liam to learn a new spell that enables self-repair to anything that gets damaged. Liam later learns knights have entered the Promised Land in search of pixies, and goes to confront them. Liam easily defeats them and forces them to leave. Liam has the rescued pixies live in the village and gives them names to evolve them into elves. Showing a helmet from one of the knights to Scarlet, Chris, and Reina, Scarlet deduces the knights came from Palta, a kingdom near the Promised Land. She also believes that scouts from two other nearby kingdoms, Jamil and Quistador, will also arrive. Liam believes they may attempt to take control of the Promised Land, so the beastkin volunteer as the Promised Land's first army. A noble named Leonardo Berkeley from Jamil arrives to inform Liam that Jamil's king wishes to form an alliance if Liam marries Scarlet. Liam uses a new telepathic spell to secretly talk to Scarlet before agreeing, but requests for a one year engagement to finish building his nation. Liam and his double teleport to Scarlet's mansion as Scarlet arrives there with another double. Liam senses Radon's power within the mansion coming from a dragon statue. Using a spell, Liam makes the statue briefly merge with Scarlet, giving her armor that enables her to use magic, but this drains her magic. Liam creates a smaller version of the statue that allows herself to maintain her armor without wearing her out. He then forms a contract with her and nicknames the armor Ares. After forming a contact with the metal dragon, it briefly merges with Liam, giving him the Guardian Radon armor and allowing him to fire thirty-seven spells at once, but then hears Radon saying that he is actually the third to survive using this spell.
6	"Liam Tries Making Incredible Armor"; Transliteration: "Riamu, Sugoi Yoroi o Tsukutte Mita" (Japanese: リアム、すごい鎧を作ってみた)	Yoshinobu Kasai	Shōta Gotō	Yoshinobu Kasai	February 11, 2025
After a recap of the previous five episodes, Liam is allowed to borrow the Guardian Radon before sending himself back to the village and Scarlet back to Jamil. Reina informs Liam of trolls nearby, and learns that they are quite violent towards humans. Liam heads to their location and finds little resources there before being confronted by the trolls themselves. They are distrustful of Liam and refuse to ally with him. After dodging the leader's attacks and using the Guardian Radon Armor to protect himself, the trolls finally agree to listen, and Liam warns them that people from the nearby kingdoms may try to seize the Promised Land before teleporting them to his village. Chris has a competitive relationship with the troll leader, who then decides to form a contract with Liam. He is named Guy and shrinks to the size of a human; he has evolved into a Giga, allowing him to fight back against Chris. Liam also names the other trolls and evolves them into Gigas too. They and Chris help bring boulders to the village to extract rare metal from them with the help of Liam's spirit familiars, which he uses to create another magical armor named Apollo, which is shaped like the sun. He designs more armor for the villagers and has them do combat training. When some thugs arrive to capture the elves, Reina sends in an elf named Mina, who easily defeats them. The thug leader then takes Liam hostage to try and force them to surrender, but Liam easily beats him. The thugs are forced to retreat. That night, Liam returns to his pocket dimension and has multiple water spirits convert salt water into fresh water. Liam also forms a contract with one of them, which he has helped evolve earlier, and names her Celsius Zero, granting her the power to possess objects. She then possesses a magical battle armor; this gives Chris, Reina, and Guy new skills after they try out the new armor. Radon is further impressed by Liam's improvements.
7	"Liam Tries Fighting Dracula"; Transliteration: "Riamu, Dorakyura to Tatakatte Mita" (Japanese: リアム、ドラキュラと戦ってみた)	Kazuya Fujishiro	Kana Yamada	Shinichi Omata	February 18, 2025
After requesting money from Liam, Asuna and Jodi buy Liam a new spell: Dust Box, which creates a small dimensional pocket where time moves much more rapidly; one hour in the box equals one year. Liam realizes it can be used to make fermented foods like soy sauce and wine in minutes. He then invites Asuna and Jodi to live in his village. The villagers begin harvesting fruit so Liam can turn them into alcohol. A vampire attacks the village and infects one of the Gigas, though Liam cures him and the vampire runs away. Jodie realizes for the vampire to survive sunlight, there must be a Dracula nearby that rules over other vampires. A horde of 10,000 vampires approaches the Promised Land, including vampirized orcs and goblins. With everyone wearing Liam's new battle armors, the villagers clear a path for Liam to reach the Dracula and teleport him far away from his army. The Dracula proves to be immune to most magic and injuries due to it already being dead. Liam traps the Dracula inside a Dust Box, having realized living beings cannot be placed inside it, but dead ones can. After forcing the Dracula to spend ten years inside the box (ten hours outside it) without blood or magical energy, it is forced to go into hibernation, which Liam intends to be permanent.
8	"Liam Tries Becoming King of the Promised Land"; Transliteration: "Riamu, Yakusoku no Chi de Ō ni Natte Mita" (Japanese: リアム、約束の地で王になってみた)	Naoki Murata	Tatsuya Takahashi	Shinichi Watanabe	February 25, 2025
With the Dracula defeated, his army starts to die, so Liam cures them with his magic. The vampires accept Liam's offer to live in the Promised Land, so he evolves them into Noble Vampires, making them immune to sunlight. Four days later (thousands of years inside Dust Box), the Dracula can't sustain hibernation anymore and dies. The king of Jamil is enraged that Liam defeated the Dracula, which would have been his excuse to send an army into the Promised Land, as his true plan is to take control of it. As the village expands, merchants from Quistador request to speak to the king of the Promised Land. Liam is astounded when everyone in the village declares him king. Scarlet is convinced the king of Jamil is searching for something hidden in the Promised Land, which may be why he wants the land. Radon privately reveals to Liam that the king seeks a vault filled with ancient and forbidden spells. At Radon's request, Liam breaks the vault's first seal and learns the spell Absolute Force Shield that can completely block any physical attack. Radon suggests he should train more before attempting the second seal, which should grant him Absolute Magic Shield. However, Liam simply figures out the spell on his own based on how Force Shield works, so he can leave the second seal alone. Radon is amazed by Liam's progress, which has far exceeded his expectations.
9	"Liam Tries Talking to a Girl"; Transliteration: "Riamu, Shōjo to Hana shite Mita" (Japanese: リアム、少女と話してみた)	Naoki Murata	Shōta Gotō	Hiroshi Matsuzono	March 4, 2025
Ex Blast, a representative of Palta's king, requests Liam to marry Palta's princess Flora. Liam saves Flora from a magical explosion while Ex Blast disappears. Scarlet recognizes Flora as an illegitimate daughter of Palta's king, so not a real princess. She deduces Ex Blast used Flora as a disposable victim to frame Liam for murdering the king's daughter, justifying Palta invading. After removing a monster-transforming curse that she has (used as a backup plan should Flora survive), Liam invites Flora to live safely in the Promised Land. Scarlet demands Liam demonstrate his power by issuing his own currency made to an exceptionally high standard of craftsmanship. This would demonstrate his kingdom's wealth and technical prowess without violence. Liam creates coins of such superior quality and guild merchants rate them as three times as valuable as coins from the other kingdoms. With his identity as king made public, Albrevit demands a meeting with Liam. Scarlet recognizes this as an attempt to recover from his recent dishonor and reminds Liam he is a king whilst Albrevit isn't even head of the Hamilton family. Liam meets with Bruno instead and negotiates to allow Bruno's wife's family to trade with the Promised Land. Radon is impressed by Bruno's improvement of his new family's position, and reveals it was he that suggested stripping nobles of their status every three generations, ensuring lazy nobles like Albrevit fail whilst hardworking ones like Bruno prosper. Radon reveals spells can be suppressed by a powerful enough enemy, so Liam should also train in using magic to strengthen his body, which can't be suppressed since it isn't a spell. To demonstrate, Radon manifests as a young girl, revealing she is actually a female dragon. After learning to strengthen his body, Liam makes several intuitive deductions resulting in strengthening his spell casting, amazing Radon as such a thing should have taken months of training.
10	"Liam Tries Creating and Playing in an Ocean"; Transliteration: "Riamu, Umi o Tsukutte Ason de Mita" (Japanese: リアム、海を作って遊んでみた)	Masayoshi Nishida, Ken'ichi Ishikura	Shōta Gotō	Takaaki Ishiyama	March 11, 2025 (Note: This episode aired at 1:40 a.m. JST, 10 minutes after the original air time on TV Tokyo.)
Liam continues his training with Radon before they play tug-of-war with a glowing rope to test Liam's strength. Liam discovers that he can now cast even more spells, and receives a lecture from Radon about brute force and soft methods. After training, Liam's city has grown even bigger and plans for a palace are being made. Liam has also planned to collect salt and water to create an ocean, and his subordinates request help from Radon, who is the reason why there is no ocean. With Radon's assistance, a makeshift ocean is created in the Promised Land using the Item Box to connect it to a real ocean, which can replenish itself and prevent intruders from accidentally entering it. Everyone then decides to play on the new beach, and Liam gets embarrassed with having to judge the girls in their swimsuits. Sometime later, Liam finds Scarlet at the city gate, who informs Liam that Aiji, a land in Jamil, is suffering from a drought. Liam decides to deliver water there using the Item Box. However, Radon warns Liam that some wise decisions may lead to consequences. Scarlet later informs Liam that the king of Jamil has rejected his offer for help. When Radon suggests making rain, Liam decides not to. Liam speaks to a young noble from Jamil, who agrees with Liam's offer of water supply. He also learns from Radon and Guy that the king of Jamil has sent men to observe his planned wedding with Scarlet with the intent to keep Liam away from Aiji. To get water into Aiji without the king of Jamil knowing, Liam creates an illusionary female doppelgänger of himself, who can also use the Item Box; implants Amelia, one of his familiars, into it; and sends her to Aiji to deliver the water.
11	"Liam Tries Building a Magic City"; Transliteration: "Riamu, Mahō Toshi o Tsukutte Mita" (Japanese: リアム、魔法都市を作ってみた)	Fumio Maezono	Kana Yamada	Hiroshi Matsuzono	March 18, 2025
Liam notices merchants from all three kingdoms visiting frequently to trade. Agents from Jamil also conspicuously monitor Liam, forcing him to remain in public so he has an alibi for when his female doppleganger, Amelia, delivers the water. Liam makes a spectacle of paving all the roads in the Promised Land with melted stone. This is such a success; Liam also paves the roads leading to the other kingdoms, making travel easier for the merchants while providing an alibi lasting several days. Liam invents a new training method for regulating his magic, allowing him to detect that the land itself influences a person's magic. With this, he is able to sense the subtly different magic of agents from Palta and Quistador as well as Jamil. After a chat with Scarlet, Liam decides he needs a show of military might to make the kingdoms wary of him, but unfortunately, the Promised Land only has 10,000 fighters. With his new power, he locates a massive deposit of High Mithril, allowing him to make magic armor for all 10,000 fighters, providing a very visible deterrent against invasion. He also deduces a way of turning some of the mithril into a magic storage device underneath the new paved roads, allowing everyone he has a familiar contract with to use his spells whilst within the city walls and establish quick communication. Reina realizes Liam has created the very first Magical City anywhere in the world. Meanwhile, work constructing Liam's palace is completed and the elves hold a monthly lottery system to ensure they all get an equal chance to serve as Liam's personal maids; Liam's other subordinates are not allowed to take part in it either because they are male or are not qualified.
12	"The Kingdom of Liam Radon"; Transliteration: "Riamu-Rādōn Ōkoku" (Japanese: リアムラードーン王国)	Yoshinobu Kasai	Tatsuya Takahashi	Ken'ichi Ishikura, Shin'ichi Watanabe	March 25, 2025
Liam explains to Flora his plans to improve the lives of his people. Dragon-riding Dragoons from Quistador visit so their captain Princess Sheila can challenge Liam to a duel to see if he is worth forming an alliance with. As he already has alliances with Palta and Jamil via his engagements to Scarlet and Flora, Liam agrees. Sheila uses super speed, but Liam is able to use magic to track her movements, so she admits defeat. She reveals in a past war, Radon almost destroyed Quistador, so Quistador is requesting a non-aggression treaty to avoid conflict with her. Sheila asks what Liam's kingdom is actually called, so Radon manifests in her dragon form and declares it to be the Kingdom of Liam Radon. Sheila is amazed Liam shares his magic freely with his citizens, and asks him about magic crystals. Liam is confused, until Radon explains that while Liam can use his magic at 100% efficiency, other people cannot. The result is wasted magic that eventually forms beautiful crystals more valuable than diamonds. Liam realizes with everyone using his magic inefficiently, harvesting the crystals could become a national source of profit. Bruno reveals the crystals become more beautiful with age, with stones more than 300 years old being 5 times more valuable. Liam uses Dust Box to age the stones to 500 years and sends one to Sheila's father, King of Quistador, who nearly faints at the crystals' value and quickly sends Liam gifts in return. Albrevit grows even more jealous of Liam. Having made alliances with all three kingdoms, Liam delegates some of his work to Scarlet and Flora so he can focus on mastering every type of magic Radon can teach him.

== Reception ==
By October 2024, the series had 800,000 copies in circulation.

== See also ==
- My Unique Skill Makes Me OP Even at Level 1, another light novel series by the same writer
- Necromancer Isekai: How I Went from Abandoned Villager to the Emperor's Favorite, another light novel series by the same writer
- Noble Reincarnation, another light novel series by the same writer
- So What's Wrong with Getting Reborn as a Goblin?, a manga series by the same writer
