= Necromancer Isekai: How I Went from Abandoned Villager to the Emperor's Favorite =

Japanese light novel series

- First light novel volume cover

報われなかった村人A、貴族に拾われて溺愛される上に、実は持っていた伝説級の神スキルも覚醒した (Mukuware Nakatta Murabito A, Kizoku ni Hirowarete Dekiai Sareru Ue ni, Jitsu wa Motteita Densetsu-kyū no Kami Sukiru mo Kakusei Shita)
- Genre: Fantasy, isekai
- Novel series
- Written by: Nazuna Miki
- Published by: Shōsetsuka ni Narō
- Original run: May 21, 2020 – present
- Light novel
- Written by: Nazuna Miki
- Illustrated by: Kaito Shibano
- Published by: Shueisha
- Imprint: Dash X Bunko
- Original run: February 25, 2021 – present
- Volumes: 8
- Manga
- Written by: Nazuna Miki
- Illustrated by: Suzume Kumo
- Published by: Shueisha
- Imprint: Young Jump Comics
- Magazine: Dash X Comic
- Original run: December 7, 2022 – present
- Volumes: 3
- Anime television series
- Directed by: Masahiko Komino
- Written by: Tsutomu Kaneko
- Studio: Lunch Box
- Licensed by: Remow
- Original run: 2027 – scheduled

Necromancer Isekai: How I Went from Abandoned Villager to the Emperor's Favorite (Japanese: 報われなかった村人A、貴族に拾われて溺愛される上に、実は持っていた伝説級の神スキルも覚醒した, Hepburn: Mukuware Nakatta Murabito A, Kizoku ni Hirowarete Dekiai Sareru Ue ni, Jitsu wa Motteita Densetsu-kyū no Kami Sukiru mo Kakusei Shita; 'The Villager Who Was Abandoned, Was Picked Up by an Aristocrat and Awakened a Legendary Divine Skill') is a Japanese light novel series written by Nazuna Miki and illustrated by Kaito Shibano. It began serialization online in May 2020 on the user-generated novel publishing website Shōsetsuka ni Narō. It was later acquired by Shueisha, who have published eight volumes since February 2021 under their Dash X Bunko imprint. A manga adaptation with art by Suzume Kumo has been serialized online via Shueisha's Dash X Comic section of the Niconico Seiga website since December 2022 and has been collected in three tankōbon volumes. An anime television series adaptation produced by Lunch Box is set to premiere in 2027.

== Plot ==
Once an ordinary villager, a man dies and is reincarnated into another world, where he is taken in by Duke Lawrence and named Mateo. Eventually, he is taken in by Duke Lawrence's grandfather, the Marquis. One day, Mateo touched a dragon egg he received as a gift, causing him to gain immense magical power and the egg to hatch; he names the dragon Eva. Mateo finds out his magical power is greater than anyone else in their country's history, so he uses it to revive ancient magic and pull the legendary sword Excalibur from its sheath. Later, he meets the Emperor, whom Mateo takes a liking to, not realizing that the Emperor has a massive secret.

== Characters ==
Matteo (マテオ, Mateo)
Voiced by: Maaya Uchida
Ishtar (イシュタル, Ishutaru)
Voiced by: Yuki Yomichi
Hecate (ヘカテー, Hekatē)
Voiced by: Sayako Tōjō
Metis (メーティス, Mētisu)
Voiced by: Mei Igarashi

== Media ==
=== Light novels ===
Written by Nazuna Miki, Necromancer Isekai: How I Went from Abandoned Villager to the Emperor's Favorite began serialization on the user-generated novel publishing website Shōsetsuka ni Narō on May 21, 2020. It was later acquired by Shueisha who began publishing it with illustrations by Kaito Shibano under their Dash X Bunko light novel imprint on February 25, 2021. Eight volumes have been released as of June 2025.

| No. | Release date | ISBN |
|---|---|---|
| 1 | February 25, 2021 | 978-4-08-631402-2 |
| 2 | March 25, 2021 | 978-4-08-631406-0 |
| 3 | June 25, 2021 | 978-4-08-631425-1 |
| 4 | October 25, 2022 | 978-4-08-631489-3 |
| 5 | May 25, 2023 | 978-4-08-631508-1 |
| 6 | October 25, 2023 | 978-4-08-631523-4 |
| 7 | May 24, 2024 | 978-4-08-631552-4 |
| 8 | June 25, 2025 | 978-4-08-631608-8 |

=== Manga ===
A manga adaptation illustrated by Suzume Kumo began serialization on Shueisha's Dash X Comic section on the Niconico Seiga website on December 7, 2022. Its chapters have been collected into three tankōbon volumes as of May 2025.

| No. | Release date | ISBN |
|---|---|---|
| 1 | May 19, 2023 | 978-4-08-892744-2 |
| 2 | May 17, 2024 | 978-4-08-893034-3 |
| 3 | May 19, 2025 | 978-4-08-893658-1 |

=== Anime ===
An anime adaptation was announced in the sixth volume of the light novel released on October 25, 2023. It was later confirmed to be a television series produced by Lunch Box and directed by Masahiko Komino, with series composition by Tsutomu Kaneko, and character designs by Junko Yamanaka. It is set to premiere in 2027. Remow licensed the series.

== See also ==
- Ben-To, another light novel series with the same illustrator
- I'm a Noble on the Brink of Ruin, So I Might as Well Try Mastering Magic, another light novel series by the same writer
- My Unique Skill Makes Me OP Even at Level 1, another light novel series by the same writer
- Noble Reincarnation, another light novel series by the same writer
- So What's Wrong with Getting Reborn as a Goblin?, a manga series by the same writer
