= So What's Wrong with Getting Reborn as a Goblin? =

Japanese manga series

- First tankōbon volume cover

転生ゴブリンだけど質問ある？ (Tensei Goburin Dakedo Shitsumon Aru?)
- Genre: Isekai
- Manga
- Written by: Nazuna Miki
- Illustrated by: Tsukasa Araki
- Published by: Shueisha
- English publisher: NA: Yen Press
- Imprint: Young Jump Comics
- Magazine: Tonari no Young Jump
- Original run: February 26, 2020 – present
- Volumes: 16
- Anime television series
- Directed by: Ryūta Kawahara
- Written by: Yūichirō Momose
- Music by: Takenoko Boy
- Studio: Bakkka
- Licensed by: Crunchyroll (streaming); SA/SEA: Medialink
- Original network: Tokyo MX, BS11, Sun TV
- Original run: October 5, 2026 – present
- Episodes: 7
- icon

So What's Wrong with Getting Reborn as a Goblin? (Japanese: 転生ゴブリンだけど質問ある？, Hepburn: Tensei Goburin Dakedo Shitsumon Aru?) is a Japanese manga series written by Nazuna Miki and illustrated by Tsukasa Araki. It began serialization in Shueisha's Tonari no Young Jump service in February 2020, and has been compiled into 16 volumes as of October 2026. An anime television series produced by Bakkka premiered in October 2026.

== Plot ==
Akira Yagami, a salaryman, dies after saving a boy from being hit by a truck. He finds himself reincarnated in another world as a goblin. Living with other goblins, he learns that their life in this world is very short, only about seven days. However, as a result of his tragic death, he was allowed to live a far longer than usual life: 80 years. His arrival in the world coincided with the death of the Demon Lord, but as it turns out, the world still awaits a new threat.

== Characters ==
Akira (アキラ)
Voiced by: Mitsuhiro Ichiki (PV), Kikunosuke Toya (anime)
Prior to being reincarnated as a goblin, he was Akira Yagami (八神 彰, Yagami Akira), a 29-year-old salaryman working at an IT company. Following a traffic accident, he is reborn in another world as a goblin. As with his previous life, he wears glasses. Unlike other goblins, who can only live for a few days, he had a long human-like life, having gained the skill of an unusually long lifespan due to his regrets about dying early. Because of his long lifespan, he is able to inherit the skills of other goblins who have died before him. A dying Archfiend also granted him the ability to enslave those that he defeats. He also becomes the mayor of the goblin village. He also has several love interests, who are all very competitive for him.
Chloe (クロエ, Kuroe)
Voiced by: Azusa Tachibana
A demon girl and one of Akira's companions. She has long black hair, dark skin, and a tail. Her master is the Archfiend who granted Akira his enslavement skill before dying. She is later granted the ability to see very far distances. She seems to have feelings for Akira.
Karen (カレン)
Voiced by: Yoko Hikasa
A knight who serves as a security inspector. She later becomes one of Akira's companions and appears to have feelings for him.
Simon (シモン, Shimon)
Voiced by: Banjō Ginga
An elderly man who is a margrave that owns a mansion. Though he claims that he likes goblins, he is very wary of Akira due to a past goblin attack and his Octogenarian skill.
Eirene (エイレーネ, Eirēne)
Voiced by: Sayumi Suzushiro
One of the elves who previously served the Archfiend and is a good friend to Chloe. She, Dike, and Eunomia now serve Akira after he convinces them to live. She possesses a skill called Pheromone, which enables her to sense if someone is lying or not. She also has feelings for Akira.
Dike (ディケ)
Voiced by: M.A.O
One of the elves who previously served the Archfiend and is a good friend to Chloe. She, Eirene, and Eunomia now serve Akira after he convinces them to live. She also has feelings for Akira.
Eunomia (エウノミア)
Voiced by: Wakana Kuramochi
One of the elves who previously served the Archfiend and is a good friend to Chloe. She, Dike, and Eirene now serve Akira after he convinces them to live. Though she appears to have feelings for Akira, she also grows jealous of her sisters doting on him and kept her distance from him at first.
Albert (アルバート, Arubāto)
Voiced by: Natsuki Hanae
A prince and Simon's grandnephew. It was he who killed the Archfiend. He possesses a skill called Restart, which allows him to rewind time.
Izuiizu (イズイース, Izuīsu)
Voiced by: Hiro Shimono
The Dark-Sky Dragon who formerly worked with Albert. After befriending Akira, he chooses to stay in the goblin village. He can change between adult and child form, and has the ability to clone bodies.
Creation of Heaven and Earth (天地開闢, Tenchi Kaibyaku)
Voiced by: Yukari Tamura
Hanzo
A male goblin that Akira names. He has the ability to clone himself and is a skilled fighter.
Kinokuniya
A female goblin that Akira names.
Echigoya
A male goblin who serves as a merchant for clothes. He now works for Simon after Akira intentionally loses a game against him.
Masamune
A female goblin who can cook. After dying and being revived by Izuiizu via clone body, she can now cook much faster than before.
Ooyuya
A goblin who built the bathhouse in the goblin village.
Hokusai
A goblin who can do art.
Saxon
A soldier who works for Albert.
Tony Weston
A guildmaster from the city where Simon and Karen live.
Kainas
A powerful weapon master who serves Echigoya. He has a daughter who cares for goblins.
Takahashi
Akira Yagami's fellow salaryman from his old life.
Kaede
Takahashi's girlfriend.

== Media ==
=== Manga ===
The series is written by Nazuna Miki and illustrated by Tsukasa Araki. It began serialization in Shueisha's Tonari no Young Jump service on February 26, 2020. The first tankōbon volume was released on June 19, 2020; 16 volumes have been released as of October 19, 2026. The series is licensed in English by Yen Press.

No.	Original release date	Original ISBN	North American release date	North American ISBN
1	June 19, 2020	978-4-08-891575-3	November 22, 2022	978-1-9753-4604-1
2	November 19, 2020	978-4-08-891721-4	March 21, 2023	978-1-9753-4606-5
3	May 19, 2021	978-4-08-891895-2	September 19, 2023	978-1-9753-6728-2
4	November 19, 2021	978-4-08-892130-3	December 12, 2023	978-1-9753-7470-9
5	April 19, 2022	978-4-08-892273-7	April 16, 2024	978-1-9753-7472-3
6	October 19, 2022	978-4-08-892468-7	August 27, 2024	978-1-9753-7474-7
7	April 18, 2023	978-4-08-892666-7	January 21, 2025	978-1-9753-8861-4
8	August 18, 2023	978-4-08-892793-0	May 27, 2025	979-8-8554-0363-3
9	January 18, 2024	978-4-08-893085-5	November 25, 2025	979-8-8554-0365-7
10	June 19, 2024	978-4-08-893271-2	May 26, 2026	979-8-8554-2231-3
11	November 19, 2024	978-4-08-893429-7	April 27, 2027	979-8-8554-2233-7
12	March 18, 2025	978-4-08-893639-0	—	—
13	August 19, 2025	978-4-08-893787-8	—	—
14	March 18, 2026	978-4-08-894038-0	—	—
15	September 17, 2026	978-4-08-894153-0	—	—
16	October 19, 2026	978-4-08-894382-4	—	—

=== Anime ===
An anime television series adaptation was announced on March 11, 2026. The series will be produced by Bakkka and directed by Ryūta Kawahara, with Yūichirō Momose handling series composition, Hiroyuki Saita designing the characters, and Takenoko Boy composing the music. It premiered on October 5, 2026, on Tokyo MX and other networks. The opening theme song is "Hello" (ハロー) performed by Sou, and the ending theme song is "Chiisana Bokura" (小さな僕ら; 'Little Us') performed by AHUB. Crunchyroll is streaming the series. Medialink licensed the series in South, Southeast Asia and Oceania (except Australia and New Zealand) for streaming on Ani-One Asia's YouTube channel.

==== Episodes ====
No.	Title	Directed by	Written by	Storyboarded by	Original release date
1	"So What's Wrong with Getting Reborn as a Goblin?"; Transliteration: "Tensei Goburin Dakedo Shitsumon Aru?" (Japanese: 転生ゴブリンだけど質問ある？)	Ryūta Kawahara	Yūichirō Momose	Ryūta Kawahara	October 5, 2026
After dying in a truck accident while saving a young boy, salaryman Akira Yagami reincarnates into another world as a small blue goblin and finds himself face to face with other small blue goblins. He creates a pair of glasses for himself. Goblins typically live for only seven days, but compensate for this with a high sex drive and high fertility rates, which Akira struggles with as he is not sexually attracted to goblin females. All goblins possess a single innate skill they can pass to a survivor upon death. Akira, however, possesses the "Octogenarian" skill, giving him an 80-year lifespan, and in a short amount of time, has inherited almost 300 skills from deceased goblins. While exploring a forest, Akira encounters a dying vampire-like being called an Archfiend and tries to heal him. Impressed by Akira's skills, the Archfiend bestows upon him the "Absolute Loyalty" skill, which instantly enslaves any opponent Akira defeats, before disintegrating. The rest of the world celebrates the Archfiend's death, unaware a humble goblin now holds the power to conquer the world. Conflict arises when a goblin accidentally kills a human out of self defense, prompting a retaliation force led by Inspector Karen. Akira easily subdues her knights, turning them into his loyal servants. Amused, Karen agrees to spare the village if the offender who murdered the human serves a seven-day "life sentence." The elderly 6.9-day-old goblin accepts and dies peacefully minutes into his imprisonment. Akira is voted mayor of the goblin village for resolving the crisis, but Karen’s superior remains unsatisfied, demanding a face-to-face meeting with Akira.
2	"So What's Wrong with Meeting a Sly Old Fox?"	Unknown	Unknown	TBA	October 12, 2026
A young demon girl tracks the "Absolute Loyalty" skill, hoping to find the missing Archfiend, who is her master. While traveling through a city, Akira learns that humans sometimes keep goblins as pets, hence why some people aren't afraid of him. Akira visits Margrave Simon’s mansion and discusses human-goblin cooperation with an elderly gardener, who turns out to be Simon and Karen's superior. Willing to make peace, Simon takes Akira to a hostess bar. He reveals that he likes goblins due to their lustful nature, which mirrors his own belief that life is to be enjoyed, while Akira tells Simon about his Octogenarian skill. Akira uses magic to save a boy from a stampeding horse, so Simon grants the goblin village full human rights, but secretly orders Karen and another operative to monitor Akira as a potential threat. To build long-term relations with humans, Akira assigns goblins skill-based names like "Hanzo" for fighters and "Kinokuniya" for merchants, names that will be inherited by their replacements. He also establishes formal laws to present goblins as civilized. Two weeks later, Hanzo captures a human that attacked him. Karen worries that these rapid changes will raise alarm. She also allies with the goblins to avoid scaring them. The demon girl arrives and attacks the goblin village, accusing Akira of murdering the Archfiend. Akira defeats her and clarifies that the Archfiend trusted Akira to inherit his skill, causing the girl to break down in tears over her master's death. Upon learning that Akira possesses Absolute Loyalty, Simon becomes convinced that God sent Akira to destroy humanity.
3	"So What's Wrong with Negotiating with Humans?"	Unknown	Unknown	TBA	October 19, 2026
After Akira has Karen and Chloe, the demon girl from before, try on new dresses, Karen asks Akira if he intends to become the next Archfiend, but Akira assures her that he will use his skills to benefit everyone. Chloe is surprised that Akira has the Octogenarian skill. After inheriting the Heal skill multiple times, Akira fears it was wasted. However, when he and Chloe both activate Far Sight, Akira’s skill disappears while Chloe’s evolves into Horizon Sight. He realizes that sacrificing two duplicate skills evolves them into one superior skill. Adventurers attack the village to kill Chloe, ignoring the goblins' new human rights. Karen and Akira agree that the attack is illegal and let Hanzo beat them up. Warned by Karen that defeating four experienced adventurers will cause trouble, Akira sends Chloe dressed as a princess and Hanzo as her brave knight into town to gain public sympathy. He and Karen also accompany them. One of the townsfolks is at first wary of them, but Chloe's scared act results in him being humiliated. Simon acknowledges their right to self-defense, then challenges Akira to a game: if Simon wins, the goblin clothing merchant Echigoya must work for him; if Akira wins, Simon will protect Chloe. Simon cheats using magic to win, but Akira intentionally lets him, so he agrees to send Echigoya to work for Simon. Recognizing Akira’s strategic brilliance, Simon gives Karen the "Goblin Slayer" dagger to assassinate Akira when he becomes a threat. Later, as Akira begins inheriting the evolved Superior skills from dying goblins, which he uses to defend the goblin village from human attacks, a fearful Karen decides to seduce him in his home instead of risking a failed assassination that would turn her into his loyal slave.
4	"So What's Wrong with Being an Assassination Target?"	TBA	TBA	TBA	October 26, 2026
It is revealed that Simon instructed Karen to seduce him in the first place, but Karen changes her mind and leaves, so Simon’s secret Operative takes over, knocks out and captures Karen, and stabs Akira with the Goblin Slayer. However, this is revealed to be a Shadow-clone, and the real Akira knocks the Operative unconscious. Karen tells Akira about the Goblin Slayer while Akira reveals that he was aware of Simon's plot. Confronting Simon, he explains that 50 years ago, humans decided to exterminate all goblins. The last survivor, the "Last One", spontaneously evolved three skills to ensure the species survival; Immortality, Parthenogenesis, and all goblin skills, killing 10,000 humans in revenge. Since then, humans have maintained a small goblin population to prevent another Last One from emerging. To demonstrate the value of letting him live, Akira demonstrates his new Superior skill, Great Heal, which can cure any fatal injury while the body still lives. Simon agrees to present this offer to the King. Simon’s grandnephew, Third Prince Albert, who fatally injured the Archfiend using his time-reversal skill Restart, advises Akira to charge a huge fee for Great Heal to avoid human suspicion. Albert and Simon also get the idea to make Akira the next Archfiend. Meanwhile, Chloe finds humans attacking three elves named Eirene, Dike, and Eunomia, who are old friends of hers and former servants of the Archfiend. After dispersing the attackers and having a goblin named Masamune cook food for the elves, Dike explains that the long-lived elves eventually lose the will to continue living unless commanded otherwise. Since the Archfiend’s death broke his Absolute Loyalty effect on them, Eirene and Eunomia have stopped eating. Akira attacks them to trigger Absolute Loyalty, ordering them to live. While they recover, Karen notices Akira collapse in private, having secretly used the skill Scapegoat to absorb all the pain of his own attack so the elves did not feel it. He then heals his injuries.
5	"So What's Wrong with Getting Hated by a Teenage Elf?"	TBA	TBA	TBA	November 2, 2026
The grateful elves swear loyalty to Akira and he asks Echigoya to make new clothes for them while having the elves take a bath. Akira then asks Karen to report that the elves have been taken in by them so they won't be targeted. Dike has trouble moving in her new clothes and runs away after accidentally falling on Akira, which makes Karen jealous, and Karen leaves to inform Simon about the elves being in Akira's care. A group of adventurers later confront Akira, who cleverly sees through their tactics. After defeating the adventurers, Karen returns, having been given a new outfit by Echigoya, and reveals that Akira is free to protect the elves. Karen also tells Akira more about Albert, making Akira wonder about his skills. She then deducts that the adventurers only attacked Akira is because they don't understand his kind. Akira decides to punish the adventurers by putting tattoos on their heads. Dike later reveals that she had learned how to cook, but Eunomia gets jealous of her doting on Akira. Akira likes the stew that Dike made for him, making Chloe, Karen, and Eunomia further jealous. Eunomia brings Dike to a flower field and Dike gets the idea to give some flowers to Akira, upsetting Eunomia. During their time in the baths, Dike further talks about her feelings for Akira, and in response, Eunomia goes to confront Akira for his motives and role as the new Archfiend. One of the adventurers from before returns to slay him as revenge for humiliating him, but is quickly defeated and is forced to leave the forest for good. Eunomia is still confused that Akira won't use his Archfiend powers, but Akira explains that he just wanted her and her sisters to live. Eunomia is still unwilling to accept this and runs away. That night, Eirene visits Akira and reveals that she also has feelings for him and attempts to seduce him, but Eunomia discovers this and runs away. Dike almost catches them in the act and they decide to go look for Eunomia to clear up the misunderstanding.
6	"So What's Wrong With Waging Wardrobe Warfare?"	TBA	TBA	TBA	November 9, 2026
During a party, Eirene chooses not to be involved, and Karen arrives and reveals that Albert wishes to see Akira. Eirene decides to accompany him. Albert asks if Akira wishes to convert the goblin village into a kingdom so to keep adventurers of invading the village, but Eirene, who possesses a skill called Pheromone, which allows her to sense lies, questions his true intentions. Albert finally reveals his plan to make Akira the next Archfiend before having to use Restart to wipe the whole conversation from their memories before leaving. After Echigoya is attacked and Akira heals him, two men reveal that one of the adventurers that Akira defeated before was the one who attacked Echigoya. Akira decides to go see Simon and decides that he and the adventurer are not to blame, but intends to stop sending goblins into the city until their safety can be trusted. The women in the city are unhappy that they won't get anymore of Echigoya's clothes and one of the women confronts her husband Tony Weston, who was the one responsible for allowing the attack to happen. Akira realizes what the uprising in the city has caused and although things as planned, Akira isn't too happy about it. He and Karen also notice how much Chloe has changed given how violent she was before. Karen is able to convince Akira that his actions still made people happy. The next day, Akira gets stones from a city resident, which he plans to use for his Survival of the Fittest plan. After thanking Karen for her encouragement, Akira goes to apologize to Simon for his mean actions and decides to arrange a place where goblins and humans can settle peacefully, but Simon warns him to convert his village into a kingdom in the future for the sake of his people. Meanwhile, Albert is conducting his own investigate of the goblin village. Tony later visits Akira with Kainas, a warrior who will serve as Echigoya's bodyguard, as an apology for not doing anything to stop the earlier attack. Some of the goblins then show Akira an injured scout dragon that belongs to Albert.
7	"So What's Wrong With Making Friends With a Dragon"	TBA	TBA	TBA	November 16, 2026
After healing the injured dragon, whose name is Izyz, Akira learns that it is a World-Shaker. He has the other goblins take it back to the village, but discovers that a knight is hiding nearby. After the knight unsuccessfully tries to attack him, he learns that the knight was looking for the Dark-Sky Dragon. He then makes the knight leave before returning to the village, now knowing that Albert is involved in this. Izyz, revealing that is can talk, eats Akira's healing skill and the goblins take a liking to him. Chloe returns with food supplies and reveals that Izyz is in fact the Dark-Sky Dragon, who reveals his true powerful form when Chloe antagonizes him, but Akira gets him to stop to avoid scaring the other goblins. Izyz reveals his connections to the Archfiend and how important he is to the Dragonfolk. Akira has no plans on becoming the next Archfiend and Izyz decides to stay in the village for a while. While making a feast, Masamune dies after trying to make a new dish, but Izyz revives her and creates a new clone body for her. This allows her to cook at rapid speed. Izyz tells Akira more about his skills. Later that night, Eirene tries to seduce Akira again, but Masamune thinks they're trying to conjure a baby. Akira questions Eirene about Izyz, the Archfiend, and Chloe, also learning about a group of three dragons called the Noble Triad and that one of the dragons gave a human advice on how to defeat the Archfiend. After Eirene leaves, Akira learns that humans are approaching, apparently looking for Izyz. He questions Hanzo and Izyz about the goblin lifestyle before resuming his plan to improve the village while Eunomia continues to keep her distance, wondering why Akira hasn't died yet as she remembers her past where she watched her friends die while her lifespan lasted longer than theirs. Akira finds her and after revealing his own long lifespan, wishes to live longer than her before she runs off.

== Reception ==
Writing for Anime News Network, Rebecca Silverman reviewed the first volume. She notes how, despite following isekai tropes and following common fantasy elements, the series is able to stand out and flesh out the premise. She praised the character designs, finding them adorable. She even noted how Akira being a goblin, in contrast to the world's humans, was well-done as a driving force. Although she ultimately thought positively of the volume, stating that it was better than its title suggested, she did feel that the series remained limited by its fantasy genre.

== See also ==
- I'm a Noble on the Brink of Ruin, So I Might as Well Try Mastering Magic, a light novel series by the same author
- My Unique Skill Makes Me OP Even at Level 1, a light novel series by the same author
- Necromancer Isekai: How I Went from Abandoned Villager to the Emperor's Favorite, a light novel series by the same author
- Noble Reincarnation, a light novel series by the same author
