= Noble Reincarnation =

Japanese light novel series

- Noble Reincarnation: Born Blessed, So I'll Obtain Ultimate Power
- First light novel volume cover featuring (from left to right) Zoey, Noah Ararat, and Shirley Grantz

貴族転生 ～恵まれた生まれから最強の力を得る～ (Kizoku Tensei: Megumareta Umare kara Saikyō no Chikara o Eru)
- Genre: Action; Fantasy
- Novel series
- Written by: Nazuna Miki
- Published by: Shōsetsuka ni Narō
- Original run: February 19, 2019 – present
- Light novel
- Written by: Nazuna Miki
- Illustrated by: kyo
- Published by: SB Creative
- Imprint: GA Novel
- Original run: September 13, 2019 – present
- Volumes: 11
- Manga
- Written by: Nazuna Miki; Kentaro Kurimoto (composition)
- Illustrated by: Hisui Hanashima
- Published by: Square Enix
- English publisher: NA: Comikey; Square Enix
- Imprint: Gangan Comics UP!
- Magazine: Manga Up!
- Original run: December 10, 2019 – present
- Volumes: 11
- Manga

Side Story: 14-year-old Noa's Unparalleled Journey
- Written by: Nazuna Miki; Kentaro Kurimoto (composition)
- Illustrated by: Bobcat
- Published by: Square Enix
- English publisher: NA: Square Enix
- Imprint: Gangan Comics UP!
- Magazine: Manga Up!
- Original run: September 23, 2025 – present
- Volumes: 3
- Manga

Origin: Kōtei Noah ga Tsumugu "Chichi Remeku no Musō Keifu"
- Written by: Nazuna Miki; Kentaro Kurimoto (composition)
- Illustrated by: Daiki Katayama
- Published by: Square Enix
- Imprint: Gangan Comics UP!
- Magazine: Manga Up!
- Original run: December 26, 2025 – present
- Anime television series
- Directed by: Michio Fukuda
- Written by: Toshiaki Satō
- Music by: Takafumi Wada
- Studio: CompTown (Note: Production Cooperation from Jumondou.)
- Licensed by: Crunchyroll: SEA: Tropics Entertainment
- Original network: Tokyo MX, BS NTV, AT-X
- Original run: January 8, 2026 – March 26, 2026
- Episodes: 12

Noble Reincarnation: Born Blessed, So I'll Obtain Ultimate Power (Japanese: 貴族転生 ～恵まれた生まれから最強の力を得る～, Hepburn: Kizoku Tensei: Megumareta Umare kara Saikyō no Chikara o Eru) is a Japanese light novel series written by Nazuna Miki and illustrated by kyo. It began serialization on the user-generated novel publishing website Shōsetsuka ni Narō in February 2019. It was later acquired by SB Creative who began publishing it under their GA Novel imprint in September 2019. A manga adaptation illustrated by Hisui Hanashima and with composition by Kentaro Kurimoto began serialization on Square Enix's Manga Up! manga website and app in December 2019. An anime television series adaptation produced by CompTown premiered from January to March 2026.

== Plot ==
A young man is reincarnated as Noah Ararat, the thirteenth prince of a powerful empire. Far removed from the line of succession, Noah spends his early years living freely in the fief granted to him. From a young age, he displays talent and strength, possessing an infinite level cap and a unique skill that allows him to absorb the abilities of those who swear loyalty to him. Raised in a noble environment with the best education and vast resources, Noah quickly grows in strength and influence.

The political balance of the empire shifts when the Crown Prince dies before the Emperor, triggering a fierce struggle for succession among the remaining princes. Despite his low initial standing, Noah confronts his rivals directly, overpowering them through his superior abilities and growing number of allies. Navigating conspiracies and internal power struggles within the imperial court, Noah steadily consolidates authority as he makes his way towards the throne.

== Characters ==
Noah Ararat (ノア・アララート, Noa Ararāto)
Voiced by: Karin Nanami
A young adult villager reincarnated as the thirteenth prince of the Meeres Emperor. He possesses powerful water magic, exceptionally high stats, and wields the cursed sword Leviathan, which recognizes him as its master after he proves his worth. He's also extremely talented with a sword, proven when the strongest swordsman in the Empire admitted he had nothing left to teach him, a strength further amplified by Leviathan. As more people swear loyalty to him, his stats rise significantly, and he gains additional abilities derived from his followers. Highly intelligent and strategic, he earns the title "The Wise Prince" from the Emperor for his uncanny ability to anticipate events and handle complex situations with precision. While deeply loyal to his father and devoted to the Empire's prosperity, he also cares deeply for his subordinates, going to great lengths to protect and support them.
Leviathan
A powerful and dangerous water sword that possesses a will of its own. Many have died trying to wield it. It eventually accepts Noah as its master due to his strong will, becoming his first familiar. The sword is extremely strong, able to beat virtually any opponent, and can do several tasks, such as searching for other special relics, eliminating targets at range, intimidating people, and more. Overall, it is actually a water elemental being.
Zoey (ゾーイ, Zōi)
Voiced by: Saki Miyashita
One of Noah's maids. Noah once helped her by buying her farm to save her family. At one point, she was also bribed into helping rebels capture Noah under the threat of being killed for not cooperating, but she warned Noah instead due to her loyalty to him. In turn, he helped her deal with the rebels. She appears to have a crush on him.
Shirley Grantz (シャーリー・グランズ, Shārī Guranzu)
Voiced by: Iori Saeki
A knight who becomes an ally to Noah after passing the knight selection exams. As all the others, she is amazed by Noah's intelligence and his ability to make use of people effectively. She appears to have feelings for him.
Alichey (アリーチェ, Arīche)
Voiced by: Azusa Tachibana
A young woman who works as a singer to support her poor family. Noah buys the theatre that she performs at and hires security to keep her safe while also paying her for her singing, which he enjoys.
Evelyn (エヴリン, Evurin)
Voiced by: Yui Ishikawa
One of Noah's maids, who also seems to have a crush on him. She was later promoted to Magistrate administrator, working for Noah. In Noah's words, she is extremely smart and capable, hence her promotion. Despite wanting to stay with Noah as a maid, he convinced her that her skills were too good to be a maid.
Gigi (ジジ, Jiji)
Voiced by: Misaki Watada
One of Noah's maids.
Gilbert Ararat (ギルバート・アララート, Girubāto Ararāto)
Voiced by: Shin-ichiro Miki
The first prince, who is quite manipulative. He was born to a concubine and hence wasn't the Crown Prince. As such, he only cares about money, which is used to vent his frustration. After his murderous crimes were exposed, he is executed.
Albert Ararat (アルバート・アララート, Arubāto Ararāto)
Voiced by: Kōji Yusa
The crown prince who plans to use Noah and Leviathan for his own gain. After Noah foils his coup to take the throne by force, he is killed by his butler Olivia with Noah's aid, who seeks to avenge her master, whom Albert had killed.
Henry Ararat (ヘンリー・アララート, Henrī Ararāto)
Voiced by: Daisuke Ono
The fourth prince. Compared to Albert, he is more supportive towards Noah. He specializes in more military-related tasks. He is amazed by Noah's intelligence and respects him greatly.
Oscar Ararat (オスカー・アララート, Osukā Ararāto)
Voiced by: Kengo Kawanishi
The eighth prince who helps Noah obtain Andrea's grimoire and a protection ring. He also owns a valuable goddess statue. He respects and admires Noah greatly.
Indra Ararat (Lightning Prince) (インドラ・アララート（雷親王）, Indora Ararāto (Kaminari Shinnō))
Voiced by: Tetsuo Komura
A powerful prince who helped the Emperor in the past. He is actually the Emperor's uncle.
Emperor (皇帝, Kōtei)
Voiced by: Kazuhiko Inoue
Noah's father and the ruler of the Meeres Empire; his name remains unknown. He is the one responsible for bringing the Empire to its current state of prosperity, ruling with wisdom and intelligence. Like many others, he is impressed by Noah's feats and sharp mind, yet he is often able to anticipate Noah's actions. Much like his son, he handles complex situations with remarkable composure and precision, supported by several capable subordinates such as the princes and ministers. He has a powerful information network that allows him to learn of Noah's accomplishments almost instantly. He trusts and admires Noah greatly.
Queen (王妃, Ōhi)
Voiced by: Nana Mizuki
Noah's mother. Like her husband, her name is unknown.
Dylan
Noah's butler. He came from the same town as Zoey.
Garil
A corrupt lord who threatens Zoey's family and farm. He is killed by Noah.
Rowen
A knight captain who serves as the ruler of Dossa and works for Henry. He is a close ally to Noah.
Frank and Gary
Two young princes who are Noah's older brothers. They are almost the same age as Noah.
Byron Alan
A trader and Cyndi's adoptive father.
Cyndi Alan
A former slave that Byron bought and adopted.
Ada
A girl who works for Byron. He sent her to the palace to work for the Emperor.
Andrea
A wind sorceress who is long deceased. Her corrupted soul now rests in her grimoire that Noah obtains; the latter who later exorcises her.
Allan Bardsley
An antiques dealer who gives Noah a protection ring.
Raydok
A lord who once invited Noah to a party.
Lance Rawlinson
A trader who met Noah at Raydok's party.
Marlay
The governor of Holjoy.
Maverick
A scheming finance minister.
Damian Noble
A powerful swordsman who trains Noah.
Karfun
A rebel leader who seeks to take down Noah, but is outsmarted and killed.
Noizhill
The Emperor's first prime minister.
Cruz
One of the Emperor's subordinates.
Croy
A doctor who works for the empire.
Lindsey
A deceased artist who made the sculptures that are in possession of Allan and Oscar.
Reiss Keiki
One of Henry's subordinates, who secretly commits frauds.
Viny Aussie
The Vice Minster of Justice who works for Noah.
Luthier
A fire elemental being that Noah tames, becoming his second familiar.
Graeme Ararat
The Emperor's younger brother and Noah's uncle.
Sheezu
A noble who serves Noah and the Emperor.
Dalem
A thug who was formerly a servant of Gilbert. He is executed by Shirley for his crimes.
Don Orts
A merchant who becomes a servant to Noah.
Huwawa
A spirit who was imprisoned in a painting until Noah frees her. She can shapeshift and pass through objects like a ghost. She was originally a normal girl, but was murdered by a painter, who used her blood to paint her picture. She becomes Noah's third familiar.
Chad and Rob
Two swindling thugs who work for a knight who works for the tenth prince.
Behemoth
An armored bull-like beast who becomes Noah's last familiar.
Olivia
A young woman who came to warn Noah about Albert's devious plan to take the throne. Her father previously worked for Gilbert. She also becomes a servant of Noah so he can help avenge her master, who was killed by Albert. In the end, she personally poisons Albert.
Foster and Howard
Two men who work for Albert.
Audrey
Indra's granddaughter, whom Noah is engaged to.

== Media ==
=== Light novel ===
Written by Nazuna Miki, Noble Reincarnation: Born Blessed, So I'll Obtain Ultimate Power began serialization on the user-generated novel publishing website Shōsetsuka ni Narō on February 19, 2019. It was later acquired by SB Creative who began releasing it with illustrations by kyo under their GA Novel light novel imprint on September 13, 2019. Eleven volumes have been released as of January 2026.

No.	Release date	ISBN
1	September 13, 2019	978-4-8156-0400-4
2	December 12, 2019	978-4-8156-0421-9
3	April 14, 2020	978-4-8156-0546-9
4	December 10, 2020	978-4-8156-0757-9
5	May 13, 2021	978-4-8156-1006-7
6	December 16, 2021	978-4-8156-1247-4
7	June 14, 2022	978-4-8156-1533-8
8	March 15, 2023	978-4-8156-1762-2
9	January 12, 2025	978-4-8156-2956-4
10	August 9, 2025	978-4-8156-3316-5
11	January 15, 2026	978-4-8156-3317-2

=== Manga ===
A manga adaptation illustrated by Hisui Hanashima and with composition by Kentaro Kurimoto began serialization on Square Enix's Manga Up! manga website and app on December 10, 2019. The manga's chapters have been collected in eleven tankōbon volumes as of May 2026. The manga is published digitally in North America by Comikey and by Square Enix via their Manga Up! Global app.

A spin-off manga illustrated by Bobcat and with composition by Kurimoto, titled Noble Reincarnation Side Story: 14-year-old Noa's Unparalleled Journey (貴族転生 ～外伝 14歳ノアの無双旅行～, Kizoku Tensei Gaiden: 14-sai Noah no Musō Ryokō), began serialization on Manga Up! on September 23, 2025. The spin-off's chapters have been collected in three tankōbon volumes as of October 2026. The spin-off's chapters are published in English on the Manga Up! Global app.

A second spin-off manga illustrated by Daiki Katayama and with composition by Kurimoto, titled Kizoku Tensei Origin: Kōtei Noah ga Tsumugu "Chichi Remeku no Musō Keifu" (貴族転生 ～オリジン 皇帝ノアが紡ぐ 「父レメクの無双系譜」～), began serialization on Manga Up! on December 26, 2025.

==== Noble Reincarnation ====
No.	Release date	ISBN
1	April 11, 2020	978-4-7575-6604-0
2	October 7, 2020	978-4-7575-6830-3
3	May 7, 2021	978-4-7575-7240-9
4	December 7, 2021	978-4-7575-7612-4
5	July 7, 2022	978-4-7575-8004-6
6	March 7, 2023	978-4-7575-8436-5
7	October 6, 2023	978-4-7575-8826-4
8	June 7, 2024	978-4-7575-9228-5
9	January 15, 2025	978-4-7575-9621-4
10	January 7, 2026	978-4-301-00256-7
11	May 7, 2026	978-4-301-00495-0

==== Side Story: 14-year-old Noa's Unparalleled Journey ====
No.	Release date	ISBN
1	January 7, 2026	978-4-301-00257-4
2	May 7, 2026	978-4-301-00496-7
3	October 7, 2026	978-4-301-00798-2

=== Anime ===
An anime television series adaptation was announced during the "GA Fes 2025" livestream event on January 4, 2025. It is produced by CompTown (in cooperation with Jumondou) and directed by Michio Fukuda, with Toshiaki Satō handling series composition, Takashi Kawashima and Ayumi Nishihata designing the characters, and Takafumi Wada composing the music. The series premiered from January 8 to March 26, 2026, on Tokyo MX and other networks. (Note: Tokyo MX listed the series premiere on January 7 at 24:00, which is effectively January 8 at midnight JST.) The opening theme song is "Break off", performed by Super Dragon, while the ending theme song is "You'll Be In My Heart 〜Sobani〜" performed by Azusa Tachibana as her character Alichey. Crunchyroll is streaming the series. Tropics Entertainment licensed the series in Southeast Asia.

==== Episodes ====
No.	Title	Directed by	Written by	Storyboarded by	Original release date (Note: Episodes are released on ABEMA and Crunchyroll 3 days before their televised airings.)
1	"Thirteenth Imperial Prince Noah Ararat"; Transliteration: "Dai Jū-san Shinnō Noa・Ararāto" (Japanese: 第十三親王ノア・アララート)	Kim Seung-Deok	Toshiaki Satō	Michio Fukuda	January 8, 2026
An anonymous man is reincarnated as Noah Ararat, the thirteenth son of the Meeres Emperor. His magical affinity is Water, so the Emperor grants him lordship over Almeria where the Water Tribe resides. His parents are amazed to discover that his level is SS. By the time he is six, Noah realizes his level increases infinitely the more people swear loyalty to him. He is visited by Crown Prince Albert and Fourth Prince Henry, who test him with the cursed water sword Leviathan that had killed those who tried to wield it. As he survives touching it, they let him keep it, hoping to cause trouble. Noah is furious that Albert almost killed him, but cannot oppose the Crown Prince. His maid Zoey attempts to quit as her mother lost her farm in a flood and their relatives demand that Zoey becomes a prostitute. Instead, Noah buys Zoey's hometown Dossa where the flooding occurred, deciding to protect the farmers, though he had to sell the land that was given to him with permission from his father. His butler Dylan is grateful of this as Dossa is also his hometown. Before traveling to Dossa, Henry warns Noah not to use Leviathan, which he is taking with him, as it is only loyal to its master and may kill him. Noah finds government official Lord Garil openly stealing disaster relief funds and starving the farmers. Reacting to his fury, Leviathan deems that Noah's will is strong enough to serve him and accepts him as its master. Noah executes Garil and Knight Commander Rowen, who was unaware of Garil's crimes, arrests his accomplices and begins feeding the farmers properly. Albert is pleased that Noah tamed Leviathan and might be of use to him. The Emperor is also pleased and decides to grant Noah more responsibilities upon seeing his stats now at SSS and why he sold the land.
2	"The Birth of the Songstress"; Transliteration: "Utahime no Tanjō" (Japanese: 歌姫の誕生)	Kim Seung-Deok & Tsutomu Tomuyuki	Toshiaki Satō	Ryoji Fujiwara	January 15, 2026
Noah and Zoey visit a theatre where amateur singer Alichey is threatened by thugs whom her father owes money to. Noah goes onstage and uses Leviathan to scare them away so Alichey can continue singing. Learning how poor her family is, Noah promises to pay her in exchange for her performance. Upon returning home, the thugs learn that Noah is a prince and attempt to apologize, but Noah ignores them. Henry is impressed that Noah appears smarter than princes Frank and Gary, who are close to Noah's age. Noah recalls among the princes, only Frank and Gary share the same mother. They also talk about Leviathan. While at a party, a foolish noble claims that Leviathan must be fake, which angers the sword, but Noah refuses to punish him since the man will naturally lose all his friends after criticizing a prince. Noah meets a trader named Byron Alan, and deduces that his daughter Cyndi is not his daughter. Byron admits that Cyndi is a former slave that he adopted, impressing Noah with his kindness and he invites them to visit him in the future. Eighth prince Oscar challenges Noah to find real treasure in the local antiques market. By chance, Noah discovers the missing grimoire of the legendary wind sorceress Andrea. However, Noah senses danger and threatens the grimoire with Leviathan, revealing Andrea's corrupted soul that he quickly exorcises to protect the city. Having witnessed this, antique dealer Allan Bardsley shows Noah a ring that he claims also only obeys its master. Sure enough, the ring responds to his SSS level after he puts it on and covers Noah in a magical suit of armor. He and Oscar decide to buy it. One of the thugs Noah ignored before, who has now developed enmity towards him, tries to murder him, but the armor automatically protects Noah by itself since it has formed a connection with Leviathan. The thug is then arrested. Back at the theatre, Noah is forced to protect Alichey again, this time from drunks. He purchases the theatre and employs proper security to ensure her safety, revealing to Alichey that she is the most gifted singer he has ever met and intends to have her sing for the Emperor one day.
3	"Those Gained, Those Lost"; Transliteration: "Kuwawaru Mono, Hazureru Mono" (Japanese: 加わる者、外れる者)	Kim Myeong-Geum	Toshiaki Satō	Mamoru Enomoto	January 22, 2026
Governor Marlay of Holjoy, the province where Dossa is located, is unable to repair the flooded farms as Finance Minister Maverick is withholding funds. Maverick claims that due to the flooding, Holjoy was granted tax exemption, so the damage should be repaired with the unpaid tax money. Noah points out that Holjoy was exempt because without farms, Holjoy made no profits to pay taxes with, which is why the Emperor granted additional funds. Maverick claims that he needs the money for the Emperor's retirement villa, which Noah rejects since no architect would build a villa on flood-lands. Maverick unhappily agrees to pay. For outwitting Maverick, the Emperor hires Damian Noble, the Empire's greatest swordsman, as Noah's instructor. With memories of Leviathan's previous masters, Noah defeats Noble, who confesses that Noah's technique surpasses his. The Emperor appoints Noah the Head Judge of the Knight Selection Exams, with the victor swearing loyalty as Noah's first knight. Noah agrees if he can also observe the preliminary duels, in case a fine warrior is overlooked. Zoey explains the cost alone prevents poorer warriors from participating, so Noah builds dormitories to house them for free. He also arranges for Byron to supply free meals in exchange for help placing a girl of Byron's choosing into service at the Imperial Palace, where with luck, the Emperor might make her his concubine. Noah's powers suddenly decrease in response to something happening in Almeria. The Emperor confirms that 5000 Almerian citizens have rebelled. Despite being Almeria's Lord, Noah claims that he is too young for battle and suggests sending Henry instead. Noah and Henry are attacked by rebel assassins who are targeting Noah himself, whom Noah captures alive, learning most rebels are horsemen. Noah sends Byron to start purchasing all available horse feed in Almeria and surrounding territories, since horsemen with starving horses are easier to defeat.
4	"The Almerian Rebellion"; Transliteration: "Arumeria no Hanran" (Japanese: アルメリアの反乱)	Naoki Murata	Kanichi Kato	Tomoe Makino	January 29, 2026
Under torture, the assassins admit that they were trying to capture Noah as a hostage. The Emperor congratulates Noah for starving their horses, surprising Noah that he found out so quickly. The Emperor adds a sword to Noah's crest, one of the greatest honors he could receive within a military empire. Byron warns Noah that Karfun, the rebel commander, is willing to do whatever it takes for victory. A wounded Almerian soldier arrives at the castle, having refused to support Karfun's rebellion and fled to warn Noah. Byron is confused when Noah rewards the man for information he already has, but Noah points out that he was rewarding the man's loyalty. Rebels bribe Zoey with 500 gold to knock Noah unconscious with a sleeping drug and bring him to them, threatening to kill her if she refuses, but she instead tells Noah immediately as she can't bring herself to betray him. Noah rewards her loyalty with 5000 gold, then goes along with the plan in order to confront the kidnappers. Noah defeats them and has them arrested. One drops a dagger cursed by Karfun, so Noah has Leviathan track the magic back to Karfun, stabbing him through the head from miles away. With Karfun dead, Henry captures the remaining rebels. The Emperor decides to have them drawn and quartered, but Noah confronts the Emperor in public, pointing out that ordering such an execution would be a crime as drawing and quartering is not a legal execution method. The Emperor admits that he is correct and, following the law, orders the leaders cut in half at the waist, their subordinates hanged, and the soldiers beheaded. For noticing his error and for confronting him over it, the Emperor grants Noah the title Wise Prince, also expressing regret Noah is not his eldest son destined to be the next Emperor. Several nobles are displeased by this. Noah reveals that for the Knight Selection Exam, he will order the participants to attack him while he is using his armor ring, and whoever gets closest to him will be the victor. Later, the Emperor consults First Prime Minister Noizhill on Leviathan's final seal, which must never be unsealed, and yet he wonders if Noah might be capable of it.
5	"People Are Treasures"; Transliteration: "Hito wa Takara" (Japanese: 人は宝)	Lee Ki-Sup	Toshiaki Satō	Michio Fukuda	February 5, 2026
During the knight selection exams, no one noteworthy stands out, except for a woman named Shirley Grantz, who pierces through Noah's ring and cuts his arm. Shirley apologizes, but he demonstrates his ring could actually have stopped her if he wanted it to as the point of the exam was to try wounding him. Having passed the exam, Shirley swears loyalty, boosting Noah's stats again far higher than with any of his other subordinates. Seeing Imperial Doctor Good Croy treating Noah, Shirley is impressed as her village has no doctor or healthcare, only prayers. Noah summons every hard worker from her village and has Croy select several to train as apprentice doctors, for which Shirley is intensely grateful. Shirley is drawn into gossip by Noah's maids over who might marry Noah one day. Thanks to Noah's method, many excellent knights are identified and added to the Imperial Army, though Shirley is the only one he keeps for himself. During a party, Noah receives a letter from a messenger who ran away immediately after delivering it. The letter informs him that the remaining Almerian rebels are causing trouble again, so Noah deduces that the messenger was the soldier who refused to support Karfun, now acting as a spy for Noah. This worries him as the man never trained as a spy so his chances of being caught are extremely high. He sends an emergency message to Henry, who raids a rebel camp to rescue the man, but too late as the man was already captured and tortured. Noah pays for the best medical care possible to save his life. Shirley is amazed that Noah cares so much about a single soldier. To thank Henry for his assistance, Noah goes shopping with Shirley for a gift at Allan Bardsley's shop and buys a goddess statue fashioned entirely from glass. Allan explains that it was fashioned by famous artist Lindsey, but the technique was lost after her death, so only two statues remain. Oscar drops by and reveals that he owns the second statue. Noah shocks everyone by suddenly destroying the statue and paying Allan even more to spread news of its destruction. Oscar is impressed and grateful as Noah just made his statue the only surviving Lindsey statue and thus far more valuable. Shirley is baffled by his actions, but Noah insists that people he can trust are more valuable than treasure. Six years later, an older Noah leaves with Zoey and Shirley.
6	"Dark Clouds"; Transliteration: "An'un" (Japanese: 暗雲)	Kim Seung-Deok	Kanichi Kato	Kim Seung-Deok	February 12, 2026
Now 12-years-old, Noah is famous for his intelligence and total mastery of Leviathan. He also works at the Ministry of Military Affairs for Henry, the new Minister of Military Affairs. Henry plans to send his subordinate Reiss Keiki to suppress another rebellion. Noah exposes Reiss for claiming to lead an army of 4000 soldiers, when in fact, he only has 2000, planning to keep funds for the non-existent soldiers for himself. Noah suggests letting the fraud stand, since rumours of 4000 soldiers would scare the rebels more than 2000. He insists that Reiss achieves total victory, or face severe punishment for the fraud. Henry considers asking for the Emperor's permission to send Noah to war for the experience. Slave children jump in front of Noah's carriage to escape their owners, whom Noah arrests for unregistered slavery. Their boss confronts Noah in the street, claiming he works for First Prince Gilbert. Noah knows this is likely true, but arrests the men publicly for lying about the First Prince and has them dumped at Gilbert's mansion. This assures the public that Noah does not support illegal slavery, and Gilbert will likely have the men killed to avoid his crimes being exposed. Sure enough, Gilbert expresses anger that slavers would lie about him, and pity that all the slavers died by suicide before their interrogations. Henry explains that Gilbert's obsession is money, which he uses to ease his frustration; despite being the First Prince, he is son of a concubine and cannot inherit the throne. Noah frees the slave children and takes them into his mansion so his butler Dylan can educate them. Noah promotes one of his maids, Evelyn, to Magistrate to look after a portion of his lands in Almeria. Evelyn is upset to be leaving, but accepts that if she performs well, it will reflect well on Noah. To make himself seem innocent, Gilbert reports the illegal slavery to the Emperor. While debating the punishment for such crimes, Noah corrects the Emperor in public over a matter of law, then immediately fears he went too far. Fortunately, the Emperor is pleased as he had wagered with Noizhill over whether Noah would correct him again. Having confirmed Noah's knowledge of the law, the Emperor names Noah Minister of Justice. Noah later visits Alichey's theater to listen to her perform. Later, the Emperor receives a report that time is running out to deal with a troublesome situation.
7	"The Emperor's Wishes"; Transliteration: "Kōtei no Omoi" (Japanese: 皇帝の思い)	Lee Ki-Sup	Toshiaki Satō	James Hong	February 19, 2026
Noah meets his new subordinate, Viny Aussie, Vice-minister of Justice, who informs him that Noah can judge criminal cases. At Noah's urging, Viny admits to accepting bribes, except on murder cases. Noah offers him 5000 gold if he never accepts another bribe. Realizing that Noah is honorable, Viny agrees to refuse all bribes and rejects the gold. Noah attends a party with Oscar where they talk about the empire's narrow collapse due to the indulgent actions of past princes who knew they would never become Emperor. Noah shares with Oscar his uncertainty that the Emperor made him a Minister as a sign that he favors him to be the next Emperor. Oscar discovers that the Emperor plans to make him Minister of Finance. Knights arrest hundreds of conspirators who planned an insurrection to make Albert the new Emperor, though there is no direct evidence that Albert was involved. Meanwhile, the Emperor reasons that the next Emperor will be either Oscar, Henry, or Noah. Noah sits in judgement of the conspirators, most of whom are Albert's loyal men. Noah suspects that Albert must have been involved, but finding him guilty would be a scandal. Sensing the Emperor is testing him again, Noah ignores Albert's involvement and has the conspirators executed, earning the Emperor's praise. Noah discovers intruders in his mansion whom he captures alive. Realizing that they are Albert's men, Noah wounds himself and blames the intruders, ensuring they are immediately executed and preventing Albert's actions becoming public. After his servants treat his wound, Noah realizes that the Emperor cannot punish Albert without being seen as a leader who couldn't control his own sons. As Albert is clearly impatient for power, Noah suggests creating a new title of Prime Minister Prince above all other Minister Princes, and giving the role to Albert. As the role itself comes with no additional power, the Emperor would remain in charge while Albert would believe he is now the second most powerful man in the Empire. Truly impressed with Noah's suggestion, the Emperor brings Noah to his vault to choose a reward. Noah picks a small box that engulfs him in a tornado of fire upon opening it.
8	"The First Versus the Thirteenth"; Transliteration: "Dai Ichi tai Dai Jū San" (Japanese: 第一対第十三)	Kim Myeong-Geum	Toshiaki Satō	James Hong	February 26, 2026
The tornado unleashes the fire elemental Luthier, which Noah tames into another ring. Noah tests Luthier's powers on himself, but is unharmed thanks to Leviathan being stronger than Luthier. Graeme Ararat, younger brother of the Emperor, confesses that his tyrant son committed a murder, and offers to pay a fine. Noah rejects the idea as it would set a precedent allowing wealthy individuals to get away with crime just because they can afford the fines. The Emperor makes Noah his advisor and Noah suggests wealthy individuals could instead donate money in exchange for impressive-sounding but powerless titles, such as Knight. Noah receives rhinoceros beetles from the three year old sixteenth prince. Seeing the beetles fight, Noah has Leviathan and Luthier fight each other in miniature form and finds his level actually increases from 1 to 3 within a short time, so he decides to find more magic items and make them fight to see what happens. Henry reveals a monster nest is ready for Noah's first campaign. A magic measuring box determines Noah would win by himself without an army. The Emperor postpones the campaign until a method can be found to make it a public spectacle. A man named Dalem, claiming to be Gilbert's servant, threatens a merchant in public. Citing Imperial Law, Noah has Dalem whipped to death for dishonoring Gilbert. Noah then apologizes for executing Dalem without Gilbert's permission. Gilbert reveals that Dalem was recently fired for misconduct and deserved death anyway, so he thanks Noah for protecting his reputation. Shirley is confused, until Noah explains Gilbert was clearly furious at Dalem's execution but couldn't afford to start a conflict without upsetting the Emperor. By apologizing first, Noah let Gilbert avoid the conflict by accepting his apology. To ever revisit the conflict after accepting an apology would damage Gilbert's reputation, so Dalem's death cannot be mentioned again. Don Orts, a servant of the Imperial Household, offers to work for Noah after being impressed with how he dealt with Dalem. Noah agrees, but has Dylan do a thorough investigation of Don's background.
9	"The Highest Trust"; Transliteration: "Saikō no Shinrai" (Japanese: 最高の信頼)	Lee Ki-Sup & Tsutomu Tomoyuki	Kanichi Kato	Ryoji Fujiwara	March 5, 2026
Dylan reveals to Noah that Don and his family work for Gilbert and suspects that he is a spy. Noah learns that the treasure that he is after has been found and goes to examine it, revealed to be two paintings of a mystical woman called Huwawa. One painting is real and is cursed while the other is a duplicate. He uses Leviathan to identify the real painting by slashing it, and this causes Huwawa to come out of it as a spirit. Noah, being the only one who understands her telepathically, learns that Huwawa was murdered by the painter, who used her blood in the painting. Huwawa becomes loyal to him since Leviathan enabled her to leave the painting at will. She demonstrates her powers: shapeshifting and transparency. Noah buys her painting. Byron arrives and reveals that Ada, a girl that Byron sent to palace to be a servant, may become a wife soon, and Noah tells him to send her money. Noah also sends Zoey to deliver a message to his mother to get the money needed to help Ada. Zoey also reveals how her mother is doing as the kingdom's gatekeeper, but suspects that someone is snooping around near the kingdom gates. That night, the intruder kills Zoey's mother and sneaks in, but Noah, having anticipated this, reveals that Zoey's real mother is alive and is with him and Zoey. The woman that the intruder killed is Huwawa in disguise, who, being a spirit, cannot die again. To keep up the charade, Noah has Zoey arrange a pretend funerial for her mother to ensure that she won't be targeted again while having Huwawa watch over the intruder. The intruder attacks Don for failing his role as a spy, but Noah saves and heals him. Noah forgives Don for his actions and he swears loyalty to Noah for real now, but also explains his connections to Gilbert. Noah quickly warns the Emperor to stop drinking the wine and eating the food that Gilbert served him, as they are seemly poisoned. In response, the Emperor orders Henry to investigate Gilbert's mansion and discovers that poison is being experimented on slaves. Noah grows suspicious of the situation, but the Emperor reveals that the wine is never poisoned and, after revealing his true intentions, gives Noah a promotion and the task to select the next heir.
10	"Lightning Prince and Wise Prince"; Transliteration: "Kaminari Shin'no to Ken Shin'no" (Japanese: 雷親王と賢親王)	Mamoru Enomoto & Kim Seung-Deok	Kanichi Kato	Mamoru Enomoto	March 12, 2026
Noah and Albert learn from the Emperor that the recent attempted murders that were committed happened in the hidden rooms in Gilbert's mansion, which means Gilbert will be executed for his crimes. Noah is able to resolve his with a less gruesome execution, but Albert has his own methods. Though the Emperor intends to pass ownership of Gilbert's fief to Noah, he declines as this will have a negative impact on the other princes. After discussing the granddaughter of the Emperor's uncle, Noah considers making her his wife. Don expresses his regret for betraying Gilbert, but Noah isn't upset. Noah later tells Zoey that her mother is safe. Later, Noah and Gigi come across a girl challenging people to a fight and will marry or become a servant to whoever can defeat her. The girl proves to be a strong fighter, but she is also charging people for the fight. She eventually loses to a tough fighter named Chad, but Noah reveals that he cheated with the help of his henchman Rob. After Noah defeats him, the latter retreats. After the girl recovers and learns of Chad's cheating, Noah learns that she was trying to make money for the knight selection exam. Noah gives her the money she needed, but Chad suddenly returns with his boss and men for revenge. Noah swiftly defeats them all, but discovers that the knights that Chad serves are working for the tenth prince. This causes the girl to realize who Noah really is. Noah decides to forgive the knights, but then meets the Lighting Prince Indra Ararat, who came to evaluate Noah. He turns out to be the Emperor's uncle. After resisting an influence that nearly knocks him out, Indra is impressed and allows him to marry his granddaughter, giving him a ring that brings him to a grassy filed where he challenged by an armored beast. After Noah defeats it, the beast introduces itself as Behemoth. Noah discovers that he can turn things into gold and can create a miniature version of Behemoth. He then summons miniature versions of Leviathan, Luthier, and Huwawa. The four suddenly begin to glow.
11	"Disinheritance"; Transliteration: "Haichaku" (Japanese: 廃嫡)	Lee Ki-Sup & Tsutomu Tomoyuki	Toshiaki Satō	Ryoji Fujiwara	March 19, 2026
Noah wakes up in a strange void made of stars. He briefly sees Leviathan, Luthier, Behemoth, and Huwawa before being transported back. The townsfolks and Indra are amazed by this as Gigi gives out money to everyone. The girl that Noah saved in the previous episode offers to serve him, but he refuses as he is aware that she is doing this out of pride and convinces her to learn to accept help first if she wants to serve him. She agrees as the emperor arrives. After Noah shows off his new skills, they are all convinced that he is now fit to help escort his father on his travels. While traveling, the Emperor decides to disinherit Albert as he considers him no longer fit to rule, but Noah doesn't want him to execute his own son. Noah also comes up with an idea to deal with Albert without any killings as Albert didn't commit any crimes against the Emperor. He has the Emperor come up with how he will handle this. As he hands the order to a deaf servant, Noah notices him hesitate and becomes suspicious. He stops the servant from escaping and the Emperor calls Cruz, exposing the servant's true colors to him. Noah decides that the servant will be executed, but not before they interrogate him as they suspect that he is working for Albert. Later, the Emperor has a brief talk about Leviathan with his servant. The next day, Noah and Shirley visit Albert. During a tour in Albert's estate, Noah begins to see what Albert has been doing for the past several days. Afterwards, Noah visits Alichey as she prepares to do another performance. That night, Zoey arrives with a visitor: a woman named Olivia, who warns Noah that Albert is planning a coup to take the throne by force.
12	"Nobility"; Transliteration: "Kizoku" (Japanese: 貴族)	Kim Seung-Deok	Toshiaki Satō	Tomoe Makino	March 26, 2026
Olivia explains that she is the daughter of a butler who previously worked for Gilbert and explains her intentions, also revealing that her master was killed by Albert. She then swears loyalty to Noah so she can get revenge on Albert. Noah then goes alone and travels to where Albert is preparing to launch his army. He tells Albert the truth behind his disinheritance, but Albert refuses to reconsider as he believes that he is the rightful heir to the throne. Deeming Noah a traitor, he orders his men to attack him. Noah summons Behemoth, Leviathan, Luthier, and Huwawa, who combine into a powerful being, but Noah orders it to not kill anyone nor will he kill Albert. Instead, he offers a bottle of poison to Albert so he and his men wouldn't be killed as traitors. Again, Albert refuses to stand down, but his men turn on him; they are angered with how Albert subjected their relatives to suffering the power of Leviathan. Noah gives Olivia the poison, which she personally feeds to Albert, who is outraged by her betrayal. After Albert's former men swear loyalty to Noah, he forms a plan to ensure that chaos won't break out and that Albert's eldest son will succeed him. The Emperor is impressed with Noah, and the empire begins a new era of peace. Meanwhile, Indra's granddaughter Audrey tells this story to a little girl. After three years have passed, Noah's servants and friends are still doing their duties. An older Noah is met by Audrey, who hopes to marry him. Noah then prepares to board a carriage to relocate to Almeria and rule as its lord.

== Reception ==
By August 2025, the series had over 2 million copies in circulation.

== See also ==
- I'm a Noble on the Brink of Ruin, So I Might as Well Try Mastering Magic, another light novel series by the same writer
- My Unique Skill Makes Me OP Even at Level 1, another light novel series by the same writer
- Necromancer Isekai: How I Went from Abandoned Villager to the Emperor's Favorite, another light novel series by the same writer
- So What's Wrong with Getting Reborn as a Goblin?, a manga series by the same writer
