= My Unique Skill Makes Me OP Even at Level 1 =

Japanese light novel series

- First light novel volume cover

レベル1だけどユニークスキルで最強です (Reberu Ichi dakedo Yunīku Sukiru de Saikyō Desu)
- Genre: Fantasy, isekai
- Novel series
- Written by: Nazuna Miki
- Published by: Shōsetsuka ni Narō
- Original run: February 24, 2017 – April 19, 2020
- Light novel
- Written by: Nazuna Miki
- Illustrated by: Subachi
- Published by: Kodansha
- English publisher: NA: Kodansha USA
- Imprint: Kodansha Ranobe Books
- Original run: August 31, 2017 – September 1, 2023
- Volumes: 9
- Manga
- Written by: Nazuna Miki
- Illustrated by: Mawata
- Published by: Kodansha
- English publisher: NA: Kodansha USA
- Magazine: Suiyōbi no Sirius
- Original run: May 30, 2018 – present
- Volumes: 17
- Anime television series
- Directed by: Yūji Yanase
- Written by: Yuka Yamada
- Music by: Endō
- Studio: Maho Film
- Licensed by: Crunchyroll; SA/SEA: Muse Communication
- Original network: Tokyo MX, BS NTV, AT-X
- Original run: July 8, 2023 – September 23, 2023
- Episodes: 12
- icon

My Unique Skill Makes Me OP Even at Level 1 (Japanese: レベル1だけどユニークスキルで最強です, Hepburn: Reberu Ichi dakedo Yunīku Sukiru de Saikyō Desu) is a Japanese light novel series written by Nazuna Miki and illustrated by Subachi. It was published in the user-generated novel publishing website Shōsetsuka ni Narō from February 2017 to April 2020. It was later acquired by Kodansha, who has released nine volumes since August 2017 under their Kodansha Ranobe Books imprint.

A manga adaptation illustrated by Mawata has been serialized in Kodansha's Niconico Seiga–based manga service Suiyōbi no Sirius since May 2018, with its chapters collected into seventeen tankōbon volumes as of October 2025. An anime television series adaptation by Maho Film aired from July to September 2023.

== Plot ==
Ryota Sato, a severely overworked office worker, dies from exhaustion and is reincarnated in a fantasy world governed by RPG-like rules. In this world, monsters drop everything people need, such as food, money, and equipment. To grow stronger, adventurers must level up. Ryota quickly learns that he is burdened with a major limitation: his level is permanently fixed at level 1, seemingly making him powerless and unable to progress like everyone else.

However, Ryota soon discovers that he possesses a unique skill already at its maximum level, the ability to get extremely rare monster drops. This power allows him to acquire high-quality items, powerful equipment, and even impossible, world-breaking rewards that compensate for his lack of levels. Partnering with adventurer Emily Brown and others they meet on the way, Ryota explores dungeons and strengthens himself in unconventional ways.

== Characters ==
Ryota Sato (佐藤 亮太, Satō Ryōta)
Voiced by: Kaito Ishikawa (Japanese); Patrick Mealey (English)
Ryota is the main character of the series, before being reincarnated into Emily's world as a drop item he was a businessman who died from overworking. Ryota is a unique existence as he is a permanent Level 1 adventurer, but has Rank S stats for all types of drops. This allows him to attain special drops from a dropless dungeon known as Nihonium, that allows him to increase his stats despite being only Level 1. He later creates the "Ryota Family" and has Emily, Celeste, Eve, and Alice join the party.
Emily Brown (エミリー・ブラウン, Emirī Buraun)
Voiced by: Rin Kusumi (Japanese); Kelsey Maher (English)
Emily is the first heroine to be introduced in the series, and she was the one who got Ryota as a drop item after killing a monster in the dungeon of Telulu. Prior to meeting Ryota, she had been living in Telulu as she did not have her own place and had been hunting monsters trying to raise money to buy her own house. Emily started living together with Ryota after he bought her one, she decided that they should live together. It is revealed that prior to the start of the series, that Emily's mother had been an adventurer who died after saving her party from some monsters. She is hinted to have feelings for Ryota and has a somewhat yandere personality when it comes to him.
Eve Callusleader (イヴ・カルスリーダー, Ivu Karusurīdā)
Voiced by: Marika Kōno (Japanese); Trisha Mellon (English)
Eve first met Ryota in a dungeon after she attempted to chop him in the head but was shocked and surprised that it had no effect. Eve became addicted and obsessed with Ryota's Rank S carrots, so much so that she eventually joined his party just to get more of those carrots. Eve is known and feared by all of Cyclo for loving carrots and her signature move "Excalibur". Her catchphrase is "Death or Carrots".
Erza Monsoon (エルザ・モンスーン, Eruza Monsūn)
Voiced by: Mai Fuchigami (Japanese); Brittany Lauda (English)
Erza is one the receptionists at the adventurer's guild in Cyclo and is regularly seen whenever Ryota or the others sell their drops to her. Erza also tries to flirt with Ryota and attempts to ask him out, only for it to end in failure due to his obliviousness. Erza eventually joins Ryota as his personal accountant as he had special carts made that teleported their drops to his house.
Celeste (セレスト, Seresuto)
Voiced by: Saori Ōnishi (Japanese); Jessica Peterson (English)
Celeste was first introduced in Selen as a garbage burner. She is a powerful Fire Magic magician but the downside was that she would become exhausted after using her Fire Magic a few times. Ryota was reminded of his own past as she had been forced to work even though she was extremely exhausted and ended up helping her out. Celeste ended up gaining feelings for Ryota and decided to join his party and ended up living with him and Emily. Like Emily, she is shown to have a yandere side when it comes to Ryota.
Alice Wonderland (アリス・ワンダーランド, Arisu Wandārando)
Voiced by: Kanon Takao (Japanese); Hayden Daviau (English)
Alice was first introduced in Cyclo trying to join a party. Ryota recruited her as he did not want her to join a party that was clearly being abused by their leader. Alice revealed that she was born in a dungeon as her mother had been pregnant with her when she was an adventurer and ended up going into labor in a dungeon. Alice, like Ryota, had a low level cap (Level 2) after maxing out her level she gained the ability to sense certain monsters that she could turn into her familiars. She currently has two familiars that she calls "Bonesy" and "Jiggly".
Neptune (ネプチューン, Nepuchūn)
Voiced by: Hiro Shimono
Neptune is first introduced trying to recruit Ryota to his party, but after he declines the offer Neptune throughout the series tries to repeatedly recruit him. Neptune is known throughout Cyclo for being the leader of the strongest party the "Neptune Family", consisting of him and two girls who are infatuated with him: Lil and Lan.
Lil (リル, Riru)
Voiced by: Chinatsu Akasaki
Lan (ラン, Ran)
Voiced by: Maaya Uchida

== Media ==
=== Light novel ===
Written by Nazuna Miki, My Unique Skill Makes Me OP Even at Level 1 was published in the user-generated novel publishing website Shōsetsuka ni Narō from February 24, 2017, to April 19, 2020. The series was later acquired by Kodansha, who began publishing the novels with illustrations by Subachi on August 31, 2017, under their Kodansha Ranobe Books imprint. As of September 2023, nine volumes have been released. In March 2022, Kodansha USA licensed the novels for English publication.

No.	Original release date	Original ISBN	English release date	English ISBN
1	August 31, 2017	978-4-06-365039-6	January 17, 2023	978-1-64-729193-8
2	December 27, 2017	978-4-06-365047-1	May 30, 2023	978-1-64-729207-2
3	March 30, 2018	978-4-06-511506-0	September 12, 2023	978-1-64-729212-6
4	August 31, 2018	978-4-06-512964-7	December 19, 2023	978-1-64-729311-6
5	January 9, 2019	978-4-06-514551-7	May 21, 2024	978-1-64-729334-5
6	May 2, 2019	978-4-06-515660-5	September 24, 2024	978-1-64-729342-0
7	December 2, 2019	978-4-06-518288-8	January 28, 2025	978-1-64-729379-6
8	August 2, 2023	978-4-06-532785-2	May 27, 2025	978-1-64-729385-7
9	September 1, 2023	978-4-06-533306-8	September 23, 2025	978-1-64-729493-9

=== Manga ===
A manga adaptation illustrated by Mawata began serialization in Kodansha's Niconico Seiga–based manga service Suiyōbi no Sirius on May 30, 2018. As of October 2025, seventeen tankōbon volumes have been released. In November 2020, Kodansha USA licensed the manga for an English digital release.

No.	Original release date	Original ISBN	English release date	English ISBN
1	January 9, 2019	978-4-06-514229-5	January 26, 2021	978-1-64-659892-2
2	May 9, 2019	978-4-06-515416-8	February 23, 2021	978-1-64-659947-9
3	December 4, 2019	978-4-06-517842-3	March 30, 2021	978-1-63-699020-0
4	May 8, 2020	978-4-06-519336-5	April 6, 2021	978-1-63-699039-2
5	October 9, 2020	978-4-06-520819-9	May 4, 2021	978-1-63-699088-0
6	February 9, 2021	978-4-06-522129-7	October 5, 2021	978-1-63-699403-1
7	July 8, 2021	978-4-06-523687-1	March 15, 2022	978-1-63-699659-2
8	December 9, 2021	978-4-06-526018-0	August 30, 2022	978-1-68-491412-8
9	May 9, 2022	978-4-06-527629-7	January 31, 2023	978-1-68-491662-7
10	October 7, 2022	978-4-06-529281-5	June 6, 2023	978-1-68-491961-1
11	March 9, 2023	978-4-06-530837-0	November 7, 2023	979-8-88-933266-4
12	July 7, 2023	978-4-06-532074-7	January 2, 2024	979-8-88-933318-0
13	January 9, 2024	978-4-06-534153-7	June 11, 2024	979-8-88-933569-6
14	June 7, 2024	978-4-06-535684-5	October 15, 2024	979-8-89-478103-7
15	December 9, 2024	978-4-06-537699-7	May 13, 2025	979-8-89-478522-6
16	May 9, 2025	978-4-06-539071-9	—	—
17	October 9, 2025	978-4-06-541059-2	—	—

=== Anime ===
An anime television series adaptation was announced in May 2022. The series is produced by Maho Film and directed by Yūji Yanase, with Yuka Yamada in charge of series composition, characters designed by Miyako Nishida, Eri Kojima, Kaho Deguchi and Yuko Oba, and music composed by Endō. It aired from July 8 to September 23, 2023, on Tokyo MX and other networks. The opening theme song is "Chase Me" by Nora from Konya, Anomachikara, while the ending theme song is "Tamborine no Naru Oka" (タンバリンの鳴る丘; lit. 'The Tambourine-Ringing Hill') performed by Airi Miyakawa. Crunchyroll streamed the series and premiered it along with an English dub. Muse Communication has licensed the series in Asia-Pacific.

No.	Title	Directed by	Written by	Storyboarded by	Original release date
1	"He's a Human That Was Dropped by a Slime"; Transliteration: "Suraimu kara Doroppu Sareta Ningen nano Desu" (Japanese: スライムからドロップされた人間なのです)	Yūji Yanase	Yuka Yamada	Yūji Yanase	July 8, 2023
Ryota awakens in Telulu dungeon where a young adventurer named Emily informs him, somehow, he was the loot item dropped by the slime she just killed. She explains that in this world absolutely everything is gathered from monster drop items, from powerful magic weapons to everyday groceries. The value being is determined by the adventurer's drop rank. Ryota finds despite only being level 1 himself his Gatherer skills are all Rank S, above A level. He kills a slime and it drops more bean sprouts than Emily has ever seen, confirming every drop item he earns will have S level value. Ryota earns enough money from bean sprouts to rent a small apartment and invites the homeless Emily to move in to repay her kindness. Ryota learns from adventurer guild secretary Erza, that Nihonium dungeon which has never dropped an item of any value. Ryota investigates Nihonium himself and learns Nihonium only drops special items for those with Rank S drops to increase their stats, despite his level 1 status, which should be impossible. With his increased skills, he attempts Telulu's second floor to gather carrots but is mocked by other adventurers for being level 1, in particular by a strange bunny-girl who claims to hate level 1's, but then she follows him home claiming she loves him.
2	"Death or Carrot"; Transliteration: "Deddo oa Ninjin nano Desu" (Japanese: でっどおあにんじんなのです)	Naoyoshi Kusaka, Kyōhei Ōyabu & Yūichi Nakazawa	Yuka Yamada	Takeshi Mori	July 15, 2023
After hitting Ryota in the head, a normally fatal blow known as Excalibur, the bunny-girl demands to know how he survived. Not wanting to disclose Nihonium has given him S-level health, Ryota distracts her with his Rank S-quality carrots. On his next Nihonium visit, the bunny-girl follows and witnesses him actually getting drop items, but he again distracts her with promises of more carrots. Delivering the carrots to the guild, the adventurers are shocked he knows Eve, the Killing Rabbit, and hasn't been brutally beaten up yet. When he explains about the carrots pacifying her, Erza buys every carrot for a small fortune, since carrots approved by carrot fanatic Eve could only be of the highest quality. In Telulu, Ryota witnesses an experienced adventurer driving his trainees beyond exhaustion and then insults Ryota for being so laid back. Eve tells the man off, pointing out his effort is wasted when Ryota gets better items without trying. Ryota and Emily desire a magic cart to increase how much they can carry, but a quality cart costs 10 million. Later, a giant gorilla attacks the city and most adventurers flee since it spawned outside a dungeon and won't drop items. These spawns are considered as strays. Assisted by Emily and Eve, Ryota kills the gorilla and is amazed when a stray actually drops an item.
3	"Kill All the Little Black Things"; Transliteration: "Kurokute Chiisai Are wa Minagoroshi nano Desu" (Japanese: 黒くて小さいアレは皆殺しなのです)	Shigeki Awai	Kunihiko Okada	Yūji Yanase	July 22, 2023
The item turns out to be a revolver, but Ryota worries where to get ammunition once he runs out. He and Emily begin hunting Cockroach-slimes which drop pumpkins. Emily, who hates cockroaches, goes berserk. They end up with too many pumpkins to carry. More cockroach-slimes spawn from the pumpkins outside the dungeon, some of which drop ammunition. Ryota learns monsters can spawn outside dungeons from drop items left unattended too long, and rushes off while Erza was in the middle of asking him on a date. By experimenting, he forces a slime to spawn outside, kills it, and it drops ammunition. Now with a steady supply of bullets he experiments with floor one Nihonium monsters and acquires ice magic bullets. On the way home, a merchant reveals his cart containing items from a ghost monster called a Femini has fallen down a cliff, and unless it is retrieved soon multiple Femini will spawn. Ryota kills a Femini possessing the merchant while his adventurer escort volunteers to reach the cart alone. Ryota stops her and, against the merchant's demands, freezes the cart with ice bullets which Emily then smashes, stopping more Femini from spawning. As Emily dealt the final blow on so many high level monsters, her own level increases several times.
4	"Moving to a New Place! Just Relaxing at Home"; Transliteration: "Shinkyo e Ohikkoshi! Ouchi de Mattari Jikan nano Desu" (Japanese: 新居へお引越し！ おうちでまったり時間なのです)	Yasuo Ejima	Shunma Hara	Yasuo Ejima	July 29, 2023
A monster Ryota kills drops a necklace which doubles the items dropped by monsters. Their increased wealth tempts Ryota to start looking for a better house for Emily. While selling bamboo shoots Ryota meets a strange lady who buys them all. Erza reveals she is Eric Macy, a gourmet connoisseur. Not wanting Ryota taken advantage of Erza acquires him trademark rights to the "Ryota Bamboo Shoot". In Nihonium Ryota encounters crown Princess Margaret and her guards acting as her adventurer party. They reveal monsters that don't drop items are actually dropping oxygen, which is valuable when bottled. Ryota and Emily decide they need a magic cart more than a house but when they reach Orton's shop his young daughter Olga tells them Orton disappeared in the Arsenic dungeon. After finding Orton safe they help him locate a floating monster he needs to craft a new prototype cart. For helping him, and saving the city from the gorilla, Orton rewards them the cart for free. At the guild Ryota saves Erza from a violent customer, so she impulsively kisses him, embarrassing them. With the cart they make the money for a new house in three days, though they also keep the old house for the memories. Eve is quick to visit the house for her carrots.
5	"Yay! It's My Turn Now"; Transliteration: "Yatta! Watashi no Otōbankai nano Desu" (Japanese: やった！ 私のお当番回なのです)	Kyōhei Ōyabu	Kōji Bandai	Yūji Yanase	August 5, 2023
Ryota is challenged to an arm wrestle by Neptune, an attractive hunter with multiple girlfriends. Even with his S level strength Ryota only just wins. Neptune insists Ryota join his team, but Ryota is uninterested and refuses. Princess Margaret's team gifts Ryota a Pandora Box that automatically collects dropped items, which Ryota uses as a shortcut to harvest bullets in larger quantities and also discovers fire bullets and a mystery bullet. A magic storm is forecast, that nullifies all magic and stops monsters from dropping items, so most hunters take the day off. Reyes asks for help when his partner Rosa is trapped in the Silicon dungeon. No one volunteers, not even Neptune, since Silicon monsters are too difficult to kill without magic. Ryota volunteers as his bullets still work. He locates Rosa but runs out of bullets. Emily decides to find him as he has the same personality as her mother, who died fighting a dragon to protect her friends. She and Eve bring Ryota more bullets by copying his Pandora Box shortcut and successfully retrieve Rosa. Reyes cannot heal her due to the storm, but Ryota reveals his mystery bullets are healing bullets, and heals Rosa by shooting her. Emily is thankful she met Ryota.
6	"A Beautiful Girl Appears"; Transliteration: "Bijin-san Tōjō nano Desu" (Japanese: 美人さん登場なのです)	Tomihiko Ōkubo	Yui Fukuo	Tomihiko Ōkubo	August 12, 2023
Ryota begins exploring deeper floors but needs a licence to go below floor five. The licensing examiner forces a sixth floor Steel Slime to spawn which Ryota easily kills to earn his license. Ryota forces another gorilla to spawn then kills it so he now has two revolvers for different bullets. The Adalberd Group, which corruptly controls Silicon's sixth floor where rice is gathered, refuses to sell anymore rice until Erza raises the price. Neptune is hired to assassinate them but Ryota defeats them with his new sleep bullets. Clint Gray, the Dungeon Chief of Secro, asks Ryota to help end a dispute over Selen dungeon with the Hetero village. Hetero has a monopoly on meat dungeons and Secro on vegetable dungeons but Selen drops both, so he needs Ryota's skills to temporarily increase the ratio of vegetable drops so Secro can claim Selen and its meat drops as well, ending their reliance on buying meat from Hetero. Ryota takes Emily with him. Camping overnight Ryota discovers even household trash spawns monsters if not burnt properly, but by killing the resulting Frankenstein monster he discovers homing bullets that chase targets if the first shot missed. Arriving at Selen they find the sheer amount of trash generated by so many hunters is becoming dangerous. Ryota sees a fire mage in charge of burning it but realises from her symptoms she is severely overworked, just as she collapses from exhaustion.
7	"This Dungeon Battle Is a Vortex of Schemes"; Transliteration: "Bōryaku Uzumaku Danjon Sōdatsusen nano Desu" (Japanese: 謀略渦巻くダンジョン争奪戦なのです)	Naoyoshi Kusaka	Kunihiko Okada	Yasuo Iwamoto	August 19, 2023
The mage, Celeste, insists on continuing working so Ryota puts her to sleep and allows the trash to spawn monsters so he can gather more homing bullets. Celeste recovers and explains drops from Selen are temporarily tax exempt until Selen's owner is determined, so hundreds of adventurers are there taking advantage and generating extra trash. Ryota learns from Duke, Secro's representative, that adventurers will capture vegetable monsters for him to kill to increase the S level vegetable drops. Harvard, Hetero's representative, hires F rank adventurer Eugene to kill as many vegetable monsters as possible that will drop nothing attempting to sabotage Ryota's efforts, but luckily using the new homing bullets Ryota kills the monster on his own. Ryota buys Emily an expensive jeweled ring she admired earlier, which increases the value of all her dropped items by one level. Ryota encounters trouble when Harvard manipulates a powerful meat dropping monster to attack them. If Ryota kills it, it will drop S level meat, ruining Secro's claim to Selen, but Emily is able to kill it which causes it to drop nothing as her drops are Rank F. Harvard hires triple the number of Hetero adventurers so Ryota is forced to hunt only the rarest monsters with the best drops. Harvard fires Eugene and his adventurers who try to ambush Ryota for costing them their jobs. After defeating and healing them Eugene realizes he misjudged Ryota.
8	"You Can Do It! Get 'Em, Celeste!"; Transliteration: "Ganbare! Yatchae! Seresuto-san nano Desu" (Japanese: がんばれ！ やっちゃえ！ セレストさんなのです)	Yūji Yanase	Kōji Bandai	Kumiko Habara	August 26, 2023
Celeste overworks and faints again, but when Ryota heals her she realises she has a crush on him. She explains she faints as she can only use one spell, Inferno, which drains her magic after only a few uses. There is also more trash than normal as Selen'a dungeon master has appeared and adventurers are working overtime. Neptune has already been hired to kill it but the rules say Hetero has to send a team to assist Neptune, but they are refusing in the hopes that the dungeon master staying alive will undo all Ryota's work. Ryota volunteers to kill it independently with Emily and Celeste. The Lord is a Bicorn that can make itself immune to all damage with a magic barrier. During the battle Celeste realises she loves Ryota and uses all her magic to burn away the barrier, allowing Ryota to kill it. Ryota gives Celeste the drop item, bi-horns allowing her to use a less powerful fire spell that costs zero magic, meaning she need never faint again. Secro village is awarded ownership of Selen. Neptune punishes Harvard for his underhanded tricks that cost him the chance to team up with Ryota. Ryota and Emily invite the thrilled Celeste to come to Secro with them.
9	"We've All Been Waiting! It's Eve's Turn to Shine"; Transliteration: "Mattemashita! Ivu-chan no Otōbankai nano Desu" (Japanese: 待ってました！ イヴちゃんのお当番回なのです)	Naoyoshi Kusaka	Kōji Bandai	Yūji Yanase	September 2, 2023
Ryota learns of the Harvest Festival, an event where dungeon items are advertised to the public then used to spawn monsters for gladiatorial fights. A monster accidentally spawns in Secro, and though they defeat it Emily's warhammer is destroyed. Eve hears of Ryota's return and runs to find him for more carrots. Smith, a weapon merchant, leaps at the chance to craft Emily a new warhammer, since Emily using one of his weapons will be good advertising. Ryota encounters Princess Margaret again and learns customers are bored of her air boxes, so he suggests she switch to selling rings. Margaret loves the idea and promises to give him her first ring. Erza asks Ryota to collect rarer items for the festival. Ryota obtains a potion that increases drop item values, but as a Rank S it is useless to him. Eve finally catches him and gets her carrots. Flashbacks show as a child Eve hated vegetables. One day after killing a monster a small boy appeared as the dropped item, like Ryota, and after killing a monster himself he gave Eve her first S Rank carrot, addicting her for life, then the boy simply vanished. As her own drop rank is D she could never gather carrots herself, so Ryota gives her the potion allowing her to get A Rank carrots herself. As only Ryota can get the potion as a drop item Eve asks to join his party, despite her fierce reputation as a solo hunter.
10	"The Arrival of Alice"; Transliteration: "Arisu-chan Tōjō nano Desu" (Japanese: アリスちゃん登場なのです)	Kyōhei Ōyabu	Yui Fukuo	Kyōhei Ōyabu	September 9, 2023
Another magic storm appears and they learn the storms give Celeste migraines. As they need a bigger house anyway Ryota deliberately buys one that blocks the storms effects, curing Celeste's migraine. Ryota decides to find the rare items for Erza and on Telulu's seventh floor they encounter the experienced adventurer still taking advantage of his trainees. A weak girl named Alice starts visiting the guild trying to join a party. Ryota starts increasing his mana levels, allowing him to use magic. By spawning a metal-slime that mimics his fighting style, then killing it, Ryota learns the spells Wind-blade and Reservation, a useful spell that transfers his S Rank drop rates to another person for the duration of a single monster kill. Alice almost joins the experienced manipulator but is rescued by Ryota who takes her into his party instead. Ryota learns despite her low levels Alice was born in a dungeon, meaning she knows instinctively where every monster is and can even tame some monsters into smaller, more powerful versions of themselves as familiars that fight for her. She does so to a female skeleton named Bonesy and a male slime named Jiggly, both of whom Celeste falls in love for their cuteness.
11	"Time for the Harvest Festival"; Transliteration: "Iza Shūkakusai nano Desu" (Japanese: いざ収穫祭なのです)	Toshiaki Kanbara	Shunma Hara	Kunihisa Sugishima	September 16, 2023
Harvest festival begins so Ryota takes Emily and Alice. A merchant sells drop items from Alkyl dungeon that spawn monsters worth lots of experience points. Ryota buys one which helps Emily level up. It also drops a Strengthening bullet which when fired gives the next bullet a boost in strength. Ryota buys every Alkyl item to get more bullets. A monster escapes the arena which Ryota kills with help from Neptune who is once again disappointed Ryota won't join his team. Celeste and Eve return from Selen in time to enjoy the festival. Ryota decides to fight monsters in the arena with Celeste, who is disappointed he only chose her for her knowledge of monsters, so she deliberately fights harder to prove she is as useful as Emily. For their reward they receive children's fireworks. Alice suddenly enters a trance and feels a strong instinct to visit the Nihonium dungeon. Clint reveals to Ryota that Alice's trance occurred at the exact moment when every one of Secro's six dungeons stopped dropping items, a catastrophe for the economy and food supply. Ryota visits Nihonium and finds the one responsible is Nihonium's dungeon master, a female ghost which is immune to physical attacks, meaning Ryota's bullets are useless against her.
12	"We're All Having a Party"; Transliteration: "Minna de Pāti nano Desu" (Japanese: みんなでパーティなのです)	Yūji Yanase	Kunihiko Okada	Yūji Yanase	September 23, 2023
Ryota realises she must become temporarily solid to hit him, so he uses homing bullets that automatically target her solid limbs, defeating her but leaving him exhausted. Emily locates and heals him with a healing bullet, revealing the dungeons are dropping items again. Ryota finds the dungeon master dropped a magic ring that can turn his experience points into crystals that can be given to anybody. With them Ryota helps Princess Margaret, Emily, Alice and Celeste level up to their maximum. Emily and Celeste also get their licenses to go below floor 5. At Ryota's suggestion they split up to cover 5 dungeons at once and begin earning a staggering 2 million pilo every day. With this they buy a magic cart each with a feature that teleports items to their home, increasing how long they can explore since the carts can never be filled. Their increased success prompts the adventurer guild to send Erza to work directly for Ryota just to keep track of all their items and arrange payments. Emily throws a huge party with everyone Ryota has met, but they quickly run out of food, forcing Ryota to visit a dungeon to get more with everyone else tagging along.

== See also ==
- I'm a Noble on the Brink of Ruin, So I Might as Well Try Mastering Magic, another light novel series by the same writer
- Necromancer Isekai: How I Went from Abandoned Villager to the Emperor's Favorite, another light novel series by the same writer
- Noble Reincarnation, another light novel series by the same writer
- So What's Wrong with Getting Reborn as a Goblin?, a manga series by the same writer
