= Wakayama Telecasting Corporation =

JOOM-DTV
- Logo used since 2023

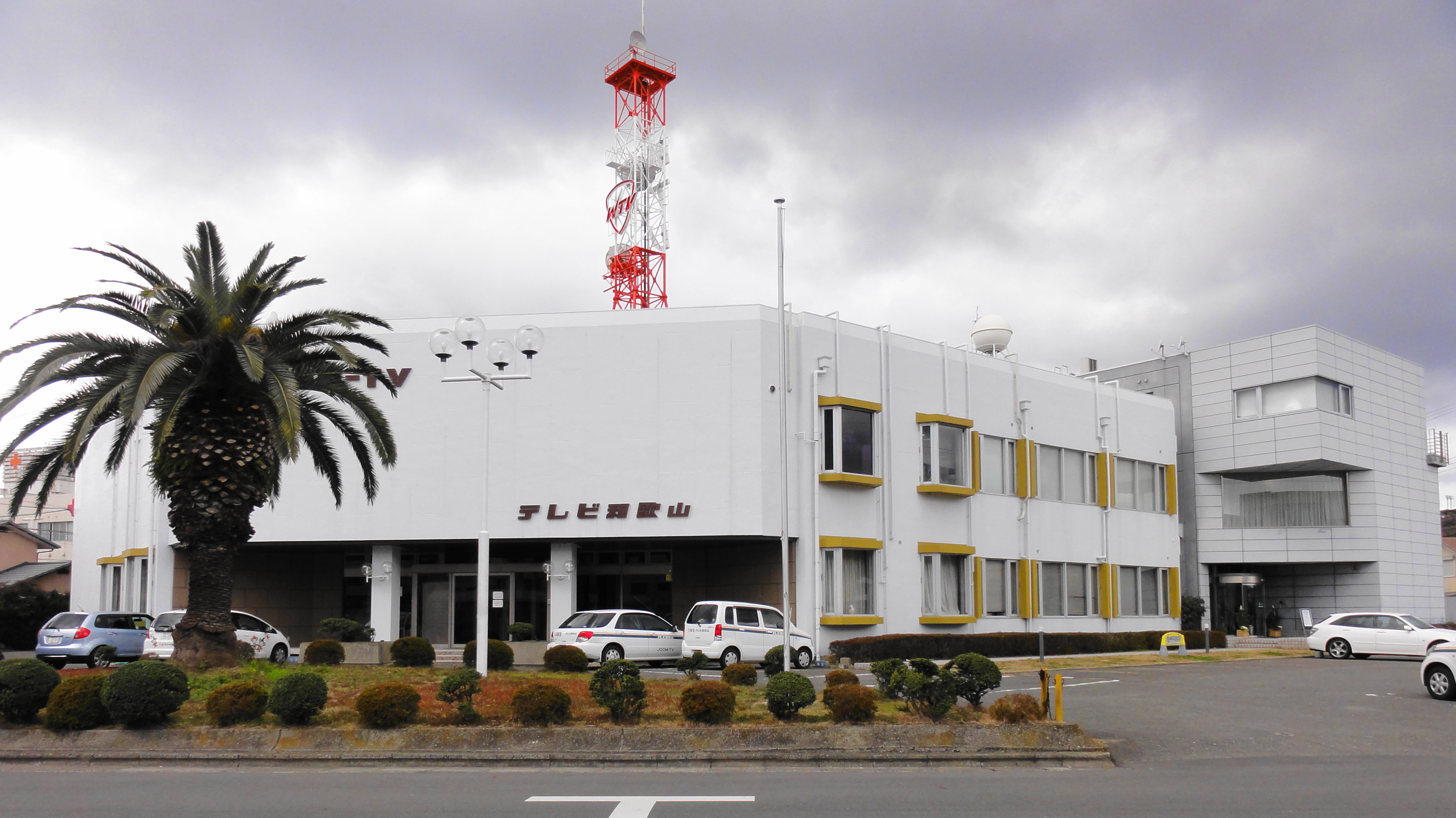
- Headquarters in Sakaedani, Wakayama

Wakayama Prefecture; Japan
- City: Wakayama
- Channels: Digital: 20 (UHF); Virtual: 5
- Branding: TV Wakayama; WTV

Programming
- Affiliations: Independent (member of JAITS)

Ownership
- Owner: Wakayama Telecasting Corp.

History
- Founded: June 7, 1968
- First air date: April 1, 1974
- Former call signs: JOOM-TV (1974-2011)
- Former channel numbers: 30 (analog UHF, 1974–2011)

Technical information
- Licensing authority: MIC

Links
- Website: Wakayama Television

Wakayama Telecasting Corp. (株式会社テレビ和歌山, Kabushiki-gaisha Terebi Wakayama), also known as WTV, is a Japanese commercial terrestrial television station, founded in 1973 and headquartered in Wakayama, Japan. It is a member of the Japanese Association of Independent Television Stations (JAITS). It is the only commercial television station whose headquarter is located in Wakayama Prefecture. The callsign of WTV is JOOM-DTV.

In 2016, WTV's news studio won the Good Design Award.

Previously, Shikoku Broadcasting, the only TV and radio station in Tokushima, established offices in Wakayama on December 1, 1960; but due to the creation of WTV, and Osaka-based stations (Such as MBS & JRT's fellow NNN/NNS affiliate, YTV) establishing relays and bureaus in the prefecture, JRT decided to close the Wakayama Bureau in 1975.

== Offices ==
- The head office - 151 Sakaedani, Wakayama, Wakayama Prefecture
- Tanabe office - 3353-9 Shinjocho, Tanabe, Wakayama Prefecture
- Tokyo office - Posco Tokyo Building (3th floor)，5-chōme-11-14 Ginza, Chuo City, Tokyo
- Osaka office - Dojima Grand bldg (6th floor), 1 Chome-5-17 Dojima, Kita-ku, Osaka

== History ==
- June 7, 1973 - Wakayama Telecasting Corporation was founded.
- April 1, 1974 - WTV starts to broadcast.
- October 1, 2006 - WTV starts digital TV broadcasting.
- July 24, 2011 - WTV ends analog TV broadcasting
