= The Banished Court Magician Aims to Become the Strongest =

Japanese light novel series

- First light novel volume cover

味方が弱すぎて補助魔法に徹していた宮廷魔法師、追放されて最強を目指す (Mikata ga Yowasugite Hojo Mahō ni Tesshiteita Kyūtei Mahōshi, Tsuihō Sarete Saikyō o Mezasu)
- Genre: Fantasy
- Novel series
- Written by: Alto
- Published by: Shōsetsuka ni Narō
- Original run: October 11, 2020 – present
- Light novel
- Written by: Alto
- Illustrated by: Yuunagi
- Published by: Kodansha
- Imprint: Kodansha Ranobe Books
- Original run: August 2, 2021 – present
- Volumes: 5
- Manga
- Written by: Alto
- Illustrated by: Yuki Monji
- Published by: Kodansha
- English publisher: Kodansha (digital)
- Imprint: Shōnen Magazine Comics
- Magazine: Magazine Pocket
- Original run: July 26, 2021 – present
- Volumes: 21
- Anime television series
- Directed by: Ken Takahashi
- Produced by: Azusa Itou; Yoshiyuki Shioya; Takaki Iwata; Nobuhiko Kurosu; Mai Suzuki
- Written by: Kazuyuki Fudeyasu
- Music by: KOUICHI; Tsubasa Takada
- Studio: Gekkou
- Licensed by: Crunchyroll: SEA: Medialink
- Original network: ANN (TV Asahi); BS Asahi, AT-X
- Original run: October 4, 2025 – December 20, 2025
- Episodes: 12
- icon

The Banished Court Magician Aims to Become the Strongest (味方が弱すぎて補助魔法に徹していた宮廷魔法師、追放されて最強を目指す, Mikata ga Yowasugite Hojo Mahō ni Tesshiteita Kyūtei Mahōshi, Tsuihō Sarete Saikyō o Mezasu) is a Japanese light novel series written by Alto and illustrated by Yuunagi. It was originally posted on the Shōsetsuka ni Narō website beginning in October 2020, before beginning publication by Kodansha under their Kodansha Ranobe Books imprint in August 2021; five volumes have been published as of August 2024. A manga adaptation illustrated by Yuki Monji began serialization on Kodansha's Magazine Pocket service in July 2021, and has been compiled into twenty-one volumes as of October 2026. An anime television series adaptation produced by Gekkou aired from October to December 2025.

== Plot ==
The story begins when Alec Ygret, once a loyal court magician supporting the crown prince from behind the scenes, is cast aside and exiled for only knowing support magic. But just as he hits rock bottom, he reunites with Yorha Eisentz, a former comrade from the legendary party Lasting Period. Invited to rejoin the team that once made history, Alec returns to dungeon exploration—and begins a new chapter in his life!

== Characters ==
Alec Ygret (アレク・ユグレット, Areku Yuguretto)
Voiced by: Shūichirō Umeda (Japanese); Eduardo Vildasol, Izzi Raine (young) (English)
Yorha Eisenz (ヨルハ・アイゼンツ, Yoruha Aizentsu)
Voiced by: Yurika Kubo (Japanese); Mikaela Krantz (English)
Krasia Annerose (クラシア・アンネローゼ, Kurashia Annerōze)
Voiced by: Masumi Tazawa (Japanese); Celeste Perez (English)
Ornest Rain (オーネスト・レイン, Ōnesuto Rein)
Voiced by: Masaaki Mizunaka (Japanese); Zac Loera (English)
Regulus Galdana (レグルス・ガルダナ, Regurusu Garudana)
Voiced by: Atsushi Abe (Japanese); Parker Davis Gray (English)
Eldas Mikayla (エルダス・ミヘイラ, Erudasu Miheira)
Voiced by: Hikaru Midorikawa (Japanese); Daniel Van Thomas (English)
Rosa Arhatia (ローザ・アルハティア, Rōza Aruhatia)
Voiced by: Sakura Tange (Japanese); Monica Rial (English)
Loki Silveria (ロキ・シルベリア, Roki Shiruberia)
Voiced by: Akira Ishida
Leviel Stanz (レヴィエル・スタンツ, Revuieru Sutantsu)
Voiced by: Naoya Uchida
Melea Dial (メレア・ディアル, Merea Diaru)
Voiced by: Shogo Sakata
Olivia (オリビア, Oribia)
Voiced by: Yoko Hikasa
Gloria (グロリア, Guroria)
Voiced by: Kishō Taniyama

== Media ==
=== Light novel ===
Written by Alto, The Banished Court Magician Aims to Become the Strongest began serialization on the user-generated web novel publishing site Shōsetsuka ni Narō on October 11, 2020. The series was later acquired by Kodansha who began releasing the series with illustrations by Yuunagi under their Kodansha Ranobe Books light novel imprint on August 2, 2021. Five volumes have been released as of August 2024.

No.	Release date	ISBN
1	August 2, 2021	978-4-06-523125-8
2	February 2, 2022	978-4-06-526058-6
3	October 3, 2022	978-4-06-529353-9
4	July 1, 2023	978-4-06-531813-3
5	August 2, 2024	978-4-06-535656-2

=== Manga ===
A manga adaptation illustrated by Yuki Monji began serialization on Kodansha's Magazine Pocket manga website on July 26, 2021. The manga's chapters have been compiled into twenty-one tankōbon volumes as of October 2026.

The manga adaptation is published in English on Kodansha's "K Manga" app.

No.	Release date	ISBN
1	November 9, 2021	978-4-06-526008-1
2	February 9, 2022	978-4-06-526885-8
3	May 9, 2022	978-4-06-527832-1
4	August 9, 2022	978-4-06-528647-0
5	November 9, 2022	978-4-06-529646-2
6	February 9, 2023	978-4-06-530536-2
7	May 9, 2023	978-4-06-531559-0
8	August 8, 2023	978-4-06-532467-7
9	October 6, 2023	978-4-06-533289-4
10	January 9, 2024	978-4-06-534161-2
11	April 9, 2024	978-4-06-535151-2
12	July 9, 2024	978-4-06-536117-7
13	October 8, 2024	978-4-06-537037-7
14	January 8, 2025	978-4-06-538047-5
15	April 9, 2025	978-4-06-539036-8
16	July 9, 2025	978-4-06-539997-2
17	October 9, 2025	978-4-06-541097-4
18	December 9, 2025	978-4-06-541883-3
19	March 9, 2026	978-4-06-543079-8
20	July 9, 2026	978-4-06-544325-5
21	October 8, 2026	978-4-06-545274-5

=== Anime ===
An anime television series adaptation was announced on March 21, 2025. It is produced by Gekkou and directed by Ken Takahashi, with Kazuyuki Fudeyasu handling series composition, Yōko Satō designing the characters, and KOUICHI and Tsubasa Takada composing the music. The series aired from October 4 to December 20, 2025, on the IMAnimation programming block on TV Asahi and its affiliates. The opening theme song is "Quest", performed by Kiro Akiyama, and the ending theme song is "Kakera" (欠片; 'Fragment'), performed by Aruma. Crunchyroll is streaming the series. Medialink licensed the series in Southeast Asia for streaming on Ani-One Asia's YouTube channel.

==== Episodes ====
No.	Title	Directed by	Written by	Storyboarded by	Original release date
1	"Alec, Banished!"; Transliteration: "Areku, Tsuihō!" (Japanese: アレク、追放！)	Ken Takahashi	Kazuyuki Fudeyasu	Ken Takahashi	October 4, 2025
In Galdana Kingdom Alec spends years being tutored by court magician Eldas as a favour to Alec's deceased mother. One day Eldas leaves the kingdom and warns Alec to never become a court magician. Several years later at Royal Magic Academy Alec learns Eldas was banished, so he decides to become a court magician and reform the corrupt system. A short time after becoming a court magician, Prince Regulus removes Alec from his adventuring party, claiming his support magic is of no value, and takes away his court magician title. Sorceress Leni and shield-bearer Iks also mock his supposed record of reaching dungeon floor 68. Leaving, he encounters Yorha, an academy classmate who dislikes the Galdana kingdom for its outdated opinions on commoners and nobility. She invites him to rejoin her party, Lasting Period, which he used to belong to at the Academy. Regulus hires Lord Vogan to replace Alec, confident with only nobles in his party he will become successful and famous. At Fizel Dungeon Alec learns from guild secretary Misha he cannot pass floor 30 until he has been an adventurer for two years. Alec enters the dungeon where it is revealed Regulus only allowed him to use support magic due to being a commoner, but Alec's strongest magic by far is attack magic.
2	"Together Again"; Transliteration: "Sai Kesshū" (Japanese: 再結集)	Masamune Hirata	Kazuyuki Fudeyasu	Masamune Hirata	October 11, 2025
In the past Lasting Period members Ornest, Krasia, Yorha and Alec reach floor 68 and graduate, making academy instructor Rosa proud. In the present, S rank Guildmaster Leviel offers Alec a pass to go below floor 30 in exchange for a magic duel. After a short duel Alec's wand is broken and he faints from draining his mana, but Leviel gives him the pass for impressing him. Ornest is furious Regulus dared to call Alec worthless when it was he that forbade him from using a sword or attack magic in case Alec surpassed him in public. Alec wishes to move on from the past, which Ornest interprets as meaning he wishes to become an S rank adventurer, surpass Regulus and humiliate him. Elsewhere, Leviel meets S rank adventurer Krista who returned injured from a dungeon without her party Rechroma. Leviel organizes a large party of adventurers for a rescue mission to floor 64, known as the tank-killing floor, which is notoriously difficult for heavily armoured adventurers. Krasia heals Alec so they can join the mission. Despite fearing he is out of practice, Alec agrees to go.
3	"Deadly Battle! The 64th Floor Boss"; Transliteration: "Shitō! 64-kaisō Furoa Bosu!" (Japanese: 死闘！64階層フロアボス！)	Gekkou, Tomonori Mine, Kentaro Iino & Shinji Sano	Michiru Tenma	Noumin6	October 18, 2025
Lasting Period uses a valuable teleportation core to go directly to the tank-killing floor, where healing magic does not work. Ornest reveals he has the relic Almaresteca, an eternally sharp, unbreakable spear. Alec defeats a Grim reaper, which he realizes the others ignored so he would have to fight it, making sure he hadn't lost his nerve. Ornest notices Alec only uses the Thunderbolt spell despite knowing many others. Alec hides the real reason and claims it has the shortest casting time. They find Rechroma member Loki Silveria being chased by a dragon. Ornest reveals Loki is generally disliked as he pretends to be useless even though everyone knows he is sneaky, underhanded and a genius strategist. Ornest reluctantly rescues Loki while the others face the dragon. Alec realizes Thunderbolt isn't strong enough, so he uses the unique spell Reflect, invented by Eldas, who only taught it to Alec. With Reflect, Alec turns the dragon's fire on itself so Ornest can behead it. Loki reveals the rest of Rechroma are fighting the floor boss, an undead suit of black armour. To help, he gives Alec a relic, the sword Schwart, but makes the confusing request Alec uses no magic against the boss.
4	"The True Floor Boss"; Transliteration: "Shin no Furoa Bosu" (Japanese: 真のフロアボス)	Akira Mineno & Ken Takahashi	Michiru Tenma	Shinji Itadaki	October 25, 2025
Regulus, Leni and Iks are defeated on floor 30 where magic doesn't work. Regulus decides Alec must have put a curse on them, even when Vogan confirms this isn't true. His father the King summons Regulus and informs him court magician Eldas was banished for claiming commoners are essential for the kingdom's prosperity. Lately, he has thought of Eldas often and began hiring skilled commoners like Alec to assess their worth. He also shows Regulus that Alec wrote a guide to passing floor 30, which Alec never saw thanks to Leni throwing it away. Regulus realizes to write such a guide Alec must have beaten floor 30 more than once. Regulus stubbornly decides Alec sabotaged him by not showing him the guide. Meanwhile, Loki confirms the undead armor is intelligent, so he hopes to trick it into thinking Alec is just a swordsman then Alec can hit it with magic at the right moment. They get there and Loki rescues his teammates Riwell and Marbell while Alec and Ornest fight the armour. Ornest demands to know why Alec keeps holding back, and he admits he feels like he failed Eldas by not managing to reform the royal court. Using his genius Loki predicts every move the Dullahan makes and lures it into Yorha's sealing spell, leaving it open for Alec to use his magic.
5	"The Useless Man and the Bratty Kid"; Transliteration: "Yakuritsu Tazu to Kuso Gaki" (Japanese: 役立たずとクソガキ)	Ken Takahashi, Masamune Hirata & Shinji Sano	Michiru Tenma	Akira Nishimori	November 1, 2025
Alec destroys the Armour but collapses from magical exhaustion. Ornest insists Alec isn't allowed to keep secrets; if something is worrying him, he needs to tell them. Loki agrees to recommend Lasting Period for the S rank promotion exam as penance for groping Krasia's chest. At the guild, Alec is visited by Vogan who scolds him for not telling Regulus how weak he actually is. Alec points out Regulus wouldn't have believed him anyway. Vogan warns Alec that Regulus is in town looking for revenge. Needing closure, Alec visits Regulus and is unsurprised to find Regulus still insisting nobles are superior and that commoners like Alec have nothing of value to teach him. To prove it he challenges Alec to a duel but halfway through he admits he read Alec's guide to floor 30 and realized it was perfect. He was forced to recognize Alec was both stronger and smarter than him, which only made him more determined to beat him. Alec defeats him so Regulus breaks down crying, genuinely not knowing what he is supposed to do. Alec admits he is still angry at Regulus. Amazingly, Regulus apologizes so Alec advises him to move forward by discovering his own path. Regulus returns Alec's court magician robe along with a letter from the King offering him his old job back any time he wants it. Alec and Regulus agree they hate each other, yet Regulus finds he is happy with how things ended.
6	"Alec and Yorha"; Transliteration: "Areku to Yoruha" (Japanese: アレクとヨルハ)	Hiromichi Matano	Michiru Tenma	Kaori	November 8, 2025
Alec asks to explore Fizel so Yorha takes him shopping. Alec asks about Loki and Yorha explains two years ago they and Rechroma teamed up to rescue another party. Ornest was hurt so Loki and Riwell had to carry him, but Loki threw away Ornest's first spear, for which Ornest never forgave him. Yorha worries Alec only joined Lasting Period because he lost his job as court magician. Alec is confident there is nowhere he would rather be than with Lasting Period. Yorha thinks he is about to kiss her, but Alec admits he was only being honest, since Ornest told him he has to always tell the truth, making Yorha furious. Rechroma informs them Leviel agreed to promote Lasting Period to S Rank immediately. Krista explains they can now access the Arcana Dungeon, which is even more difficult than floor 64. For causing more trouble, Loki is coerced into paying for a celebratory feast. Krasia is asked to heal injured adventurers attacked by the Shadow Guild. One victim is Olivia of Nameless party, one of Fizel's best swordswomen whose wounds show she was defeated in a sword duel. Olivia blames a traitor for her defeat before passing out. Alec meets Luorg, a mysterious young boy from Nameless party who asks Alec for help raiding the Labyrinth Dungeon.
7	"Labyrinth"; Transliteration: "Rabirinsu" (Japanese: ラビリンス)	Yasuo Ejima, Fumio Maezono & Shinji Sano	Masanao Akahoshi	Masamune Hirata	November 15, 2025
Luorg explains Nameless will be hunting Shadow Guild in the Labyrinth, so he needs Lasting Period to reach Labyrinth's floor 72 to retrieve the dungeon core. Ornest is certain Luorg is tricking them as the job sounds too easy. Krasia is drugged by Olivia, who re-enters the Labyrinth alone while still injured. Marbell asks to accompany Lasting Period as she is worried about Olivia. Yorha sends her to inform Leviel where they are going, as she doesn't like Marbell flirting with Alec. Ornest gives Alec a bracelet called the Mobius Ring. Reaching floor 72 Ornest and Alec both step on teleportation traps. Alec ends up surrounded by monsters but Krasia appears beside him, revealing the Mobius Ring links them together so the traps can't teleport them more than a hundred feet from each other. Alec and Krasia find evidence of Olivia while Yorha and Ornest find a floor boss sliced in half, which Ornest knows only one man is capable of; Melea Dial the Blade-master. Elsewhere, Melea is shown temporarily working with Shadow Guild. Alec and Krasia find Olivia and demand to know why she returned to the Labyrinth. Olivia admits she is seeking the traitor, her former Master who let her mother die. She then steps into a teleport trap to escape them, but they jump after her and all three teleport into a monster nest.
8	"Scars"; Transliteration: "Kizuato" (Japanese: 傷跡)	Shun Tsuchida	Masanao Akahoshi	Akira Nishimori	November 22, 2025
Olivia notes Alec has potential as a swordsman but needs more training to wield Schwart effectively. Olivia kills the goblin sorcerer using anti-magic, allowing them to teleport to safety. Olivia reveals her former master, the traitor, is Melea Dial who trained her after her mother's death. After training her into a master fighter he suddenly stabbed her in the back in a dungeon and admitted he killed her mother. Alec and Krasia decide to help her get revenge. Meanwhile, Ornest and Yorha defeat members of Shadow Guild and learn they are also seeking the dungeon's core. One of the men, Core-eater, sets off a pitfall trap that kills the rest of his men but allows him to escape with Yorha into the pit with Ornest following. Alec, Krasia and Olivia find the pit and follow them. Core-eater rejoins his teammate Gloria and Melea, revealing they need Yorha for some purpose. Ornest appears and stabs Core-eater in the back, but his consumed cores keep him alive. Gloria duels Ornest so Core-eater and Melea can escape with Yorha. Ornest stabs Gloria, but he reveals he is a user of Blood Magic, and no matter the injury his blood will always heal him instantly.
9	"Burning Blood"; Transliteration: "Buraddo Majikku" (Japanese: 血潮は燃える(ブラッドマジック))	Fumio Maezono, Shinji Sano & Kotaro Ishidate	Masanao Akahoshi	Shinji Itadaki	November 29, 2025
Ornest is knocked down while Gloria continues to recover. Gloria is surprised when Ornest throws Almaresteca away in favour of punching him in the face, a tactic he used against Alec in the past. Ornest explains that since spilling his blood makes him stronger beating him up should keep him weak. Gloria cuts his own stomach open to cast a huge spell. Meanwhile, Marbell reaches the Guild and informs Leviel and Luorg that Olivia and Lasting Period entered the labyrinth, infuriating Leviel at their recklessness. Alec appears just in time to save Ornest, who quickly explains Core-eater deliberately targeted Yorha for some purpose including the labyrinth core. Olivia and Krasia chase after Core-eater while Gloria becomes frustrated as Alec keeps using Reflect to send his spells back at him. Entering the labyrinth Leviel explains Gloria and Core-eater are probably Shadow Cultists, members of Shadow Guild that worship demons in exchange for greater power. Gloria activates his demon powers and becomes too fast for even Alec to hit with Thunderbolt. Ornest recalls his brother was an even greater spearman than he was, but he died of an illness before Ornest was able to surpass him. Meanwhile, Melea and Core-eater locate the dungeon core.
10	"Blademaster"; Transliteration: "Kenkiyoshi" (Japanese: 剣聖)	Norihiko Nagahama & Hiromichi Matano	Masanao Akahoshi	Masayoshi Nishida	December 6, 2025
Gloria is confused Alec uses magic to set Ornest on fire, but when Ornest severs Gloria's arms the fire cauterises the wounds so there is no bleeding, defeating him. Yorha is shocked when Melea executes Core-eater and takes the dungeon core. He identifies Yorha as a Seeker; one able to find Eden, a land where dungeon cores grant wishes. Olivia and Krasia appear and Melea admits he grew bored without worthy opponents, so he created one by training Olivia then betraying her. He also looks forward to fighting Alec, the son of Aria Ygret. Melea expresses disappointment Olivia hasn't improved since last time they met. He decides to kill Krasia to prove to Olivia true strength comes from being alone. Olivia defends Krasia but is grievously wounded. She claims if strength comes from isolation, she prefers to be weak with her friends. Alec arrives and while Melea defends against his offensive magic, he still takes a wound to the head. Melea is delighted to have been wounded, but is disappointed Alec has no desire to kill him. Alec decides to risk using his own original spell; Limit Break, drawing on his ability to control all five elements and absorb mana from the environment, an impossible spell for anyone except him.
11	"Beyond Limits"; Transliteration: "Genkai no Saki e" (Japanese: 限界の先へ)	Masamune Hirata & Shinji Sano	Kazuyuki Fudeyasu	Ken Takahashi & Masamune Hirata	December 13, 2025
With almost limitless mana Alec manages to wound Melea. Melea reveals he knew Eldas and that Eldas lied about Alec's mother Aria dying in a plague. Melea refuses to reveal more and tells Alec he will have to find Eldas to learn the truth. He then uses the dungeon core to increase his own power. Leviel and the others reach Ornest who reveals Limit Break can only be used for ten minutes before damaging Alec's body. Leviel has Gloria's torso retrieved and sealed. Melea starts to overpower Limit Break so Krasia activates an anti-magic circle, forcing them to fight using only swords. Melea moves to kill Alec but Olivia appears directly in front of him and slashes his chest. She asks for the real reason he betrayed her, since his claim of trying to create a strong enemy makes no sense, as she can tell he has grown weaker over the years. Melea insists he will only tell her if she defeats him. Alec hits his limit and returns to normal. Melea almost severs his head but Krasia cancels her anti-magic circle, confusing Melea for a split second. During that second Olivia deflects his sword, allowing Krasia to shoot an arrow into his heart.
12	"Lasting Period"; Transliteration: "Rasutingu Piriodo" (Japanese: 終わりなき日々を(ラスティングピリオド))	Ken Takahashi	Kazuyuki Fudeyasu	Akira Nishimori	December 20, 2025
Melea reveals Olivia's mother contracted Dungeon Sickness and transformed into a monster, so he was forced to kill her. He took in Olivia and trained her but began to question whether killing her mother was the right thing, so he decided to find Eden to resurrect her. Having been defeated he demands Olivia kill him. Olivia lets go of the past and decides Melea will be arrested instead. Melea reminds Alec to find Eldas and ask how Aria really died. Luorg decides Lasting Period should keep the Core as proof of clearing the dungeon, but when he passes it to Yorha she collapses. Within her mind she sees Adam, the first man, urging her and other heroes to find more dungeon cores and come to him. She awakens in hospital and decides to go after Shadow Guild and find out what they know. They are forced to wait as Alec is suffering Rebound; the aftereffect of abusing Limit Break, leaving him unable to use magic until it returns on its own. Olivia asks Yorha if she has any siblings, but Yorha admits she has a complicated family so she doesn't actually know. Olivia explains a member of Shadow Guild, Guran Eisenz, was almost certainly involved in her kidnapping and has the same surname as Yorha. Alec decides to train his physical skills by entering a martial arts tournament during the Flame Night Festival in Red Rogue City, with the grand prize being another dungeon core.

== See also ==
- Bonjin Tensei no Doryoku Musō, another light novel series illustrated by Yuunagi
- The Holy Grail of Eris, another light novel series illustrated by Yuunagi
- The Insipid Prince's Furtive Grab for the Throne, another light novel series illustrated by Yuunagi
- The Reincarnation of the Strongest Exorcist in Another World, the bunkobon version of the novel series is also illustrated by Yuunagi
