= Bonjin Tensei no Doryoku Musō =

Japanese light novel series

- Bonjin Tensei no Doryoku Musō: Akachan no Koro kara Doryoku Shitetara Itsunomanika Nihon no Mirai o Seotte Mashita
- First light novel volume cover

凡人転生の努力無双 ～赤ちゃんの頃から努力してたらいつのまにか日本の未来を背負ってました～
- Genre: Isekai
- Novel series
- Written by: Cyclamen
- Published by: Kakuyomu
- Original run: December 15, 2022 – present
- Light novel
- Written by: Cyclamen
- Illustrated by: Yuunagi
- Published by: ASCII Media Works
- Imprint: Dengeki Bunko
- Original run: April 10, 2024 – present
- Volumes: 6
- Manga
- Written by: Cyclamen
- Illustrated by: Akane Sasaki
- Published by: Kadokawa Shoten
- Imprint: Kadokawa Comics A
- Magazine: Comic Comp
- Original run: December 23, 2025 – present
- icon

Bonjin Tensei no Doryoku Musō: Akachan no Koro kara Doryoku Shitetara Itsunomanika Nihon no Mirai o Seotte Mashita (凡人転生の努力無双 ～赤ちゃんの頃から努力してたらいつのまにか日本の未来を背負ってました～) is a Japanese light novel series written by Cyclamen and illustrated by Yuunagi. It began as a web novel posted on Kadokawa's Kakuyomu service, before it was picked up for publication by ASCII Media Works' Dengeki Bunko imprint. The first volume was published in April 2024; six novels have been released as of May 2026. A manga adaptation illustrated by Akane Sasaki began serialization on Kadokawa Shoten's Comic Comp service in December 2025.

== Plot ==
The series follows Itsuki, a man who was stabbed to death. He finds himself reincarnated as a baby in a Japan where monsters exist and attack people. Wanting to avoid another premature death, he aims to become stronger. As he grows older, he becomes skilled in magic, finding himself to be more powerful than he expected.

== Characters ==
Itsuki (イツキ)
The protagonist, he finds himself in an alternate Japan overrun by monsters. Wanting to avoid having a violent death like in his previous life, he began working to become stronger from a young age.
Nina (ニーナ)
Itsuki's schoolmate who transferred from England. She initially sees Itsuki as a rival and wants to beat him. Due to a certain incident, they later start living together.

== Media ==
=== Light novel ===
The series is written by Cyclamen. It was originally posted Kadokawa's Kakuyomu service in December 2022, ranking first in the site's annual rankings. It was then picked up for publication by ASCII Media Works' Dengeki Bunko imprint, which released the first volume on April 10, 2024. Six volumes have been published as of May 2026.

No.	Japanese release date	Japanese ISBN
1	April 10, 2024	978-4-04-915344-6
2	May 10, 2024	978-4-04-915596-9
3	January 10, 2025	978-4-04-915913-4
4	June 10, 2025	978-4-04-916348-3
5	October 10, 2025	978-4-04-916597-5
6	May 9, 2026	978-4-04-916893-8
7	December 10, 2026	978-4-04-952370-6

=== Manga ===
A manga adaptation illustrated by Akane Sasaki began serialization on Kadokawa Shoten's Comic Comp service on December 23, 2025.

No.	Japanese release date	Japanese ISBN
1	December 10, 2026	978-4-04-972295-6

== See also ==
- The Banished Court Magician Aims to Become the Strongest, another light novel series illustrated by Yuunagi
- The Holy Grail of Eris, another light novel series illustrated by Yuunagi
- The Insipid Prince's Furtive Grab for the Throne, another light novel series illustrated by Yuunagi
- The Reincarnation of the Strongest Exorcist in Another World, the bunkobon version of the novel series is also illustrated by Yuunagi
