= The Holy Grail of Eris =

Japanese light novel series

- First light novel volume cover of the first edition, featuring (from left to right) Randolph Ulster, Scarlett Castiel, and Constance Grail

エリスの聖杯 (Erisu no Seihai)
- Genre: Fantasy; Suspense
- Novel series
- Written by: Kujira Tokiwa
- Published by: Shōsetsuka ni Narō
- Original run: October 16, 2017 – August 4, 2018
- Light novel
- Written by: Kujira Tokiwa
- Illustrated by: Yuunagi
- Published by: SB Creative (first edition, vol. 1–4); Drecom Media (second edition)
- English publisher: NA: Yen Press
- Imprint: GA Novel (first edition); DRE Novels (second edition)
- Original run: November 14, 2019 – January 7, 2026
- Volumes: 6 + 1
- Manga
- Written by: Kujira Tokiwa
- Illustrated by: Hinase Momoyama
- Published by: Square Enix
- English publisher: NA: Yen Press
- Imprint: Gangan Comics UP!
- Magazine: Manga Up!
- Original run: November 3, 2019 – present
- Volumes: 15
- Manga

Eris no Seihai S
- Written by: Kujira Tokiwa
- Illustrated by: S.Kosugi
- Published by: Drecom Media
- Imprint: DRE Comics
- Magazine: DRE Comics
- Original run: November 1, 2024 – present
- Volumes: 3
- Anime television series
- Directed by: Morita to Junpei (Note: The penname of Junpei Morita.)
- Written by: Kenichi Yamashita
- Studio: Ashi Productions
- Licensed by: Crunchyroll: SEA: Plus Media Networks Asia
- Original network: JNN (TBS), BS11
- Original run: January 8, 2026 – March 26, 2026
- Episodes: 12
- icon

The Holy Grail of Eris (Japanese: エリスの聖杯, Hepburn: Erisu no Seihai) is a Japanese light novel series written by Kujira Tokiwa and illustrated by Yuunagi. It was serialized online from October 2017 to August 2018 on the user-generated novel publishing website Shōsetsuka ni Narō. It was later acquired by SB Creative, who have published four volumes from November 2019 to March 2022 under their GA Novel imprint. A manga adaptation with art by Hinase Momoyama has been serialized online via Square Enix's Manga Up! website since November 2019 and been collected in fifteen tankōbon volumes. A new edition of the light novel series by the same author and illustrator was published in five volumes by Drecom Media in November 2024 under their DRE Novels imprint. A sixth volume and a digital short story collection were released in January 2026. An anime television series adaptation produced by Ashi Productions aired from January to March 2026.

== Plot ==
A decade ago, Scarlett Castiel was executed for supposedly trying to poison the prince's lover. In the present, Constance Grail becomes involved with helping the ghost of Scarlett figure out the chain of events that led to her death. As a result, both of them eventually discover a conspiracy that involves nations.

== Characters ==
Constance Grail (コンスタンス・グレイル, Konsutansu Gureiru)
Voiced by: Kana Ichinose
A kind-hearted low-ranked noble. She was almost vilified at a party, until Scarlett briefly possessed her to humiliate and expose the one who had framed Constance for "stealing" her treasured hairpin. She does not get along with nobles who look down on commoners and loathes baseless gossip. She makes it her life's mission to assist Scarlett in getting her vengeance.
Scarlett Castiel (スカーレット・カスティエル, Sukāretto Kasutieru)
Voiced by: Sayumi Suzushiro
A restless ghost seeking answers as to why she was killed, believing that she had done nothing to warrant execution a decade ago at just sixteen years of age. Haughty but brilliant and open-minded, Scarlett gives Constance leads on people she knew.
Randolph Ulster (ランドルフ・アルスター, Randorufu Arusutā)
Voiced by: Yōhei Azakami
Randolph was Lily's husband until her untimely death and ended up engaged to Constance and helped her with investigating Scarlett's case. He was the first person to learn about Scarlett's ghost. As time goes by, he ends up developing genuine feelings for Constance.
Lily Orlamunde (リリィ・オーラミュンデ, Riryi Ōramyunde)
Voiced by: M.A.O
Lily was a nun of the church and helped many orphaned children. When she was later found dead, it was believed that she committed suicide, albeit some believed otherwise.
Cecilia Adelbide (セシリア・アデルバイド, Seshiria Aderubaido)
Voiced by: Maaya Uchida
The princess who is the reason Scarlett was executed. While appearing to be playful and aloof, she is actually manipulative and calculating. In the past, Cecilia was an orphan who was initially mistaken as a boy until the orphanage was burned down by a corrupt noble who did not want a scandalous secret to be revealed. As a result, she willingly joined Daeg Gallus to get her revenge.
Enrique Adelbide (エンリケ・アデルバイド, Enrike Aderubaido)
Voiced by: Natsuki Hanae, Rena Motomura^{Ep. 8 credits} (young)
The crown prince who was originally engaged to Scarlett prior to his engagement to Cecilia. He deeply regrets not being able to save Scarlett.
Dominic Harmsworth (ドミニク・ハームズワース, Dominiku Hāmuzuwāsu)
Voiced by: Jun Fukuyama
A pope of the church who is somehow able to see Scarlett's ghost and helps her out whenever she needs it.

== Media ==
=== Light novels ===
Written by Kujira Tokiwa, The Holy Grail of Eris was serialized online on the user-generated novel publishing website Shōsetsuka ni Narō from October 16, 2017, to August 4, 2018. It was later acquired by SB Creative who published four volumes with illustrations by Yuunagi under their GA Novel imprint from November 14, 2019, to March 12, 2022.

A new edition under Drecom Media's DRE Novels light novel imprint was published with five volumes releasing on November 7, 2024. A sixth volume and a digital short story collection were released on January 7, 2026.

The series is licensed in North America by Yen Press.

==== Volumes ====
No.	Original release date	Original ISBN	North American release date	North American ISBN
1	November 14, 2019 (original); November 7, 2024 (new)	978-4-8156-0381-6 (original); 978-4-434-34447-3 (new)	April 19, 2022	978-1-9753-3957-9
2	May 14, 2020 (original); November 7, 2024 (new)	978-4-8156-0561-2 (original); 978-4-434-34448-0 (new)	August 16, 2022	978-1-9753-3959-3
3	October 14, 2020 (original); November 7, 2024 (new)	978-4-8156-0769-2 (original); 978-4-434-34449-7 (new)	November 22, 2022	978-1-9753-3961-6
4	March 12, 2022 (original); November 7, 2024 (new)	978-4-8156-1060-9 (original); 978-4-434-34450-3 (new)	October 24, 2023	978-1-9753-7345-0
5	November 7, 2024	978-4-434-34451-0	September 8, 2026	979-8-8554-3575-7
6	January 7, 2026	978-4-434-37126-4	January 12, 2027	979-8-8554-3626-6
SS	January 7, 2026 (digital)	—	—	—

=== Manga ===
A manga adaptation illustrated by Hinase Momoyama began serialization on Square Enix's Manga Up! manga website and app on November 3, 2019. The manga's chapters have been collected into fifteen tankōbon volumes as of September 2026. The manga adaptation is also licensed in North America by Yen Press.

A sequel manga illustrated by S.Kosugi, titled Eris no Seihai S, published its "0th" chapter on Drecom Media's DRE Comics website on October 18, 2024. It later began serialization on November 1, 2024. The sequel's chapters have been collected into three tankōbon volumes as of March 2026.

==== Volumes ====
No.	Original release date	Original ISBN	North American release date	North American ISBN
1	November 12, 2019	978-4-7575-6370-4	May 31, 2022	978-1-9753-4249-4
2	May 12, 2020	978-4-7575-6643-9	August 23, 2022	978-1-9753-4251-7
3	September 7, 2020	978-4-7575-6824-2	February 21, 2023	978-1-9753-4253-1
4	March 5, 2021	978-4-7575-7130-3	June 20, 2023	978-1-9753-5171-7
5	September 7, 2021	978-4-7575-7444-1	September 19, 2023	978-1-9753-7193-7
6	March 7, 2022	978-4-7575-7773-2	January 23, 2024	978-1-9753-7195-1
7	September 7, 2022	978-4-7575-8119-7	May 21, 2024	978-1-9753-7197-5
8	March 7, 2023	978-4-7575-8450-1	September 17, 2024	978-1-9753-9042-6
9	September 7, 2023	978-4-7575-8772-4	January 21, 2025	979-8-8554-0055-7
10	March 7, 2024	978-4-7575-9085-4	July 22, 2025	979-8-8554-1141-6
11	November 7, 2024	978-4-7575-9505-7	February 10, 2026	979-8-8554-2053-1
12	March 7, 2025	978-4-7575-9724-2	September 22, 2026	979-8-8554-2658-8
13	September 5, 2025	978-4-301-00039-6	—	—
14	January 7, 2026	978-4-301-00263-5	—	—
15	September 7, 2026	978-4-301-00744-9	—	—

==== Eris no Seihai S ====
No.	Japanese release date	Japanese ISBN
1	March 19, 2025	978-4-434-35417-5
2	September 5, 2025	978-4-434-36438-9
3	March 19, 2026	978-4-434-37490-6

=== Anime ===
An anime adaptation was announced on October 20, 2024, which was later revealed to be a television series produced by Ashi Productions (with Good Smile Film and DRE Pictures handling general production) and directed by Morita to Junpei, with series composition and episode scripts written by Kenichi Yamashita and characters designed by Chie Kawaguchi. The series aired from January 8 to March 26, 2026, on TBS and its affiliates, as well as BS11. The opening theme song is "Happy Ever After feat. Yu-ka" (Happy Ever After feat. 由薫), performed by Reina Washio, and the ending theme song is "Camellia" (カメリア, Kameria), performed by Yukari Tamura.

Crunchyroll is streaming the series. Plus Media Networks Asia licensed the series in Southeast Asia and broadcasts it on Aniplus Asia.

==== Episodes ====
No.	Title	Directed by (Note: Production staff information is taken from the ending credits of each episode.)	Written by	Storyboarded by	Original release date
1	"At the Grand Merillian"; Transliteration: "Guran Meriruan Nite" (Japanese: 小宮殿(グラン・メリル = アン)にて)	Masahiko Watanabe	Kenichi Yamashita	Kaori	January 8, 2026
As a child, Constance Grail witnesses the public execution of Scarlett Castiel. Years later, Constance's father amasses considerable debts but is able to have them paid off by engaging Constance to Lord Bronson's son, Neil. At a party soon afterwards, Constance witnesses Neil with his lover, Pamela Francis. She then encounters a mysterious woman outside the party and invites her in. Moments later, Pamela coerces a terrified noble named Brenda into framing Constance for stealing her hairpin. With everyone convinced she is a thief, Constance prays for help. The mysterious woman possesses Constance's body and within moments exposes that Pamela has been seducing Neil. She also identifies witnesses who overheard Brenda ask Constance to hold the hairpin. The crowd turns on Pamela and the woman is able to blackmail party host Lord Harmsworth into annulling Constance's engagement to Neil. The following day, Constance learns the woman is Scarlett's ghost and that having accepted her help against Pamela, they are bound together until Scarlett's wish is realized: to expose those who had her executed for a crime she did not commit.
2	"An Extraordinary Villainess and an Ordinary Girl"; Transliteration: "Kitai no Akujo to Heibon na Shōjo" (Japanese: 稀代の悪女と平凡な少女)	Fumio Maezono	Kenichi Yamashita	Ichizō Kobayashi & Morita to Junpei	January 15, 2026
Scarlett reveals she was framed for poisoning Crown Princess Cecilia. At Scarlett's direction, Constance sneaks into an orphanage and steals a nun's clothing to infiltrate the Orlamunde private church where Scarlett's friend Lily Orlamunde committed suicide. Scarlett doubts Lily killed herself and successfully locates a letter Lily hid in the church. Constance is soon interrupted by Randolph Ulster, Lily's intimidating husband. After Constance leaves, he realizes she took something. Constance returns the nun outfit but one of the orphans, Tony, tries to expose her with a spell Lily taught him. Lily's letter contains a key and instructions to "destroy the Holy Grail of Eris", which confuses Scarlett. Constance is later invited to Baroness Emilia Godwin's next party. At the party, Scarlett spots Aisha Huxley with Randolph. When he openly accuses Constance of stealing from the Orlamunde church, Scarlett takes over Constance again to protest her innocence. A fight then occurs between Teresa Jennings and Margot Tudor as the latter caught the former having an affair with her husband. With the party cancelled, Randolph warns Constance he is watching her. In private, Emilia admits Constance reminds her of Scarlett and warns her not to risk her life.
3	"Respective Answers and Beginnings"; Transliteration: "Sorezore no Kotae to Hajimari" (Japanese: それぞれの答えと始まり)	Masahiro Hosoda	Atsushi Oka	Takaaki Ishiyama	January 22, 2026
Constance is invited to the Earl John Doe Ball. Deciding Constance will wear her old mask, Scarlett sends Constance to her former home where Scarlett learns her half-brother is an unhappy man. She then tells Constance about Cornelia, the last Empress of the Faris Empire. Constance attends the party at the Montrose mansion, hosted by Deborah Darkian. Scarlett notices a woman called Jane with a sun tattoo. The party is soon raided by the Royal Security Force. Jane is injured so Constance stays to help and is caught by Randolph. Due to the circumstance, they negotiate an agreement where Randolph will pay off Constance's family debt in exchange that they enter a fake engagement. Constance tells him about proving Scarlett's innocence, which he deems harmless. Randolph is certain the slavers at the ball were not connected to the Daeg Gallus organization, as none had a sun tattoo. Randolph introduces Constance to Crown Prince Enrique, Scarlet's former fiancé, and Cecilia. Randolph and Enrique discuss Faris, which is suffering an economic crisis. Scarlett reveals Cecilia has a hateful personality she keeps hidden. King Ernst introduces himself and when Constance panics, Scarlett takes over to talk with him.
4	"The Silent Ladies' Tea Party"; Transliteration: "Kuchi Naki Kifujin-tachi no Chakai" (Japanese: 口なき貴婦人たちの茶会)	Michita Shiraishi	Toshiaki Satō	Yoriyasu Kogawa, Masayoshi Nishida & Morita to Junpei	January 29, 2026
Constance is summoned to the Silent Ladies' Tea Party led by Deborah. Abigail O'Brian, from one of the Four Great Noble Families, eventually interrupts to cancel the investigation, revealing Randolph sent her. A reporter, Amelia Hobbes, soon interrogates Constance before she publishes a sensationalized article. Kimberly Smith of the Violet Association gets in touch to scold Constance for using the drug Jackal's Paradise. Scarlett overhears Kendall Levine, a Faris diplomat, panicking that Seventh Prince Ulysses Faris is missing. Constance is later invited to tea with Cecilia and Scarlett discovers a suspicious merchant named Vado often sells Cecilia herbal teas. Cecilia reveals that in the past, one of her water jars was poisoned and Scarlett was executed due to the evidence found at the scene. Cecilia also admits she was wrong to fall in love with Prince Enrique, especially since she cannot have children. Afterward, Scarlett identifies Cecilia's tea as an abortive, which causes a shocked Constance to stops Cecilia. Suspicious of Vado, Constance visits Neil, who confirms the abortive comes from Faris. Scarlett notices their usual coachman has been replaced. When Constance uses the spell she learned from Tony, the new coachman shoots a gun at her.
5	"And the Cock Crows to Herald the Dawn"; Transliteration: "Soshite Yoake o Tsugeru Toriganaku" (Japanese: そして夜明けを告げる鳥が鳴く)	Shunji Yoshida	Toshiaki Satō	Tomoya Takashima & Kuma Fukurō	February 6, 2026 (Note: This episode aired on February 6, 2026, at 12:06 a.m. JST, 10 minutes after the regular air time on TBS.)
Constance is saved by Aldous Clayton, who reveals the coachman was a drug dealer hired to attack her. Kyle discovers a sun tattoo on the coachman and Constance remembers Jane having the same tattoo, whom Randolph knows as Kiara Grafton, a member of Daeg Gallus. A worried Kate later visits to ask Constance to stop investigating, but Constance is forced to send her away. A man named Jose proceeds to deliver Kate's hair to Constance, warning her to meet him alone. Meanwhile, Vado, real name Salvador, delivers the kidnapped Ulysses to his comrade Shossanna then confronts Jose over kidnapping Kate. When Constance attends the meeting, she and Kate are rescued by Randolph and his men thanks to the coded message Scarlett relayed about a deceased Earl named Norman Holden. Afterward, Amelia visits Constance with scandalous news concerning Cecilia allegedly being an illegitimate child. As her previous source, Teresa, is dead, Amelia asks Constance to get closer to Cecilia. Constance eventually apologizes to Kate and finally tells her everything. Elsewhere, Cecilia, who is actually working with Salvador, murders Jose in his cell. She is then informed of headquarters' message to resume the Holy Grail of Eris.
6	"The Command of the Goddess"; Transliteration: "Megami no Saihai" (Japanese: 女神の采配)	Michita Shiraishi	Kenichi Yamashita	Ichizō Kobayashi	February 13, 2026 (Note: This episode aired on February 13, 2026, at 12:06 a.m. JST, 10 minutes after the regular air time on TBS.)
Kate's testimony reveals Lily's spell is actually one of Daeg Gallus' passwords. Constance gives Lily's key to Randolph before she visits Abigail to ask for a meeting with Aisha. However, Abigail's niece Lucia turns out to be able to see Scarlett. Abigail reveals Lucia is Goddess-blessed, as is Viscount Harmsworth, suggesting he has been able to see Scarlett the whole time. Meanwhile, Randolph visits Adolphus, Scarlett's father, and demands information on the Holy Grail of Eris. When Abigail forces Aisha to invite Constance over, Scarlett possesses Constance to question Aisha on being addicted to Jackal's Paradise. Aisha eventually reveals that she was the one who tried to poison Cecilia with what she thought was a weight loss drug gifted by her cousin Sharon. Overwhelmed with guilt, Aisha tries to commit suicide but Constance stops her and demands she atone. Afterward, Constance informs Randolph of Aisha's confession and her dealings with Daeg Gallus. Once they are alone, a furious Scarlett yells at Constance. In response, Constance insists that they have not solved the mystery yet, meaning there is still more they have to do before Scarlett has her revenge.
7	"A Banquet of Insectivorous Plants"; Transliteration: "Shokuchū Hananoen" (Japanese: 食虫花の宴)	Kinya Nakamura	Toshiaki Satō	Hitoyuki Matsui	February 20, 2026 (Note: This episode aired on February 20, 2026, at 1:30 a.m. JST, 94 minutes after the regular air time on TBS.)
Amelia contacts financial comptroller Rufus May about Cecilia's finances. Meanwhile, Aldous tries to interview Aisha but finds her poisoned by Salvadore. Before dying, Aisha tells him to investigate Sharon. However, it later revealed that Sharon was also murdered. When Abigail is falsely arrested, Scarlett knows Daeg Gallus will arrange corrupt judge Kalvin Campbell to find Abigail guilty. Lady Audrey proceeds to send courtesans to the next Earl John Doe Ball to manipulate Kalvin. There, Kalvin admits he has hidden embezzled money within the Violet Association. Constance soon speaks with Kimberly, who is furious with Kalvin. After promising to find the money, she gives Constance a clue concerning the Faris and Adelbide royalty. She then makes sure Abigail is found innocent. Afterward, an anonymous culprit confessed to Aisha's murder before he committed suicide. Amelia is blamed for leaking information, so she loses her job. Once a desperate Amelia confronts Cecilia, the latter successfully threatens the former to leave the country. Elsewhere, Constance encounters two women named San and Eularia. When she meets Randolph, he reveals Lily's key is actually a key-shaped decoration that has an inscription Lily carved onto it. Constance immediately recognizes what it means.
8	"Lily Orlamunde"; Transliteration: "Riryi Ōramyunde" (Japanese: リリィ・オーラミュンデ)	Masahiko Watanabe	Atsushi Oka	Tomoya Takashima, Kuma Fukurō & Morita to Junpei	February 26, 2026
The inscription leads Constance to the Museum of History where Lily hid another letter. The letter details her friendship with Scarlett and Enrique, Scarlett's execution, Cecilia's involvement in the Holy Grail of Eris, the codename for Faris invading Adelbide, and the preparations she made before she committed suicide. Back in the present, Scarlett is saddened Lily sacrificed herself. Amelia later passes Constance her research on Cecilia. Randolph visits Commandant Dylan Bellesford, who reveals the Farisian King is terminally ill. Constance and Randolph encounter San and Eularia, who reveal they work for Alexandria, Third Princess of Faris. Constance asks why the Holy Grail of Eris was delayed ten years, and San admits it was because Scarlett was executed. Randolph confronts Scarlett's father to ask about Scarlett's late mother, Alienore Shibola, a distant relative of the Farisian royal family's final ruler, Cornelia of the Starry Crown. It is revealed that by marrying Scarlett to Enrique, Scarlett's Farisian bloodline would have automatically made Adelbide a vassal state belonging to Faris. However, Scarlett's execution prevented this. When Scarlett realizes the most likely reason why her father sacrificed her, Constance arranges a meeting with him so Scarlett can confront him.
9	"The Holy Grail of Eris"; Transliteration: "Erisu no Seihai" (Japanese: エリスの聖杯)	Shunji Yoshida	Kenichi Yamashita	Tomoya Takashima & Kuma Fukurō	March 5, 2026
In a flashback, it is revealed that Adolphus was good friends with Ernst, who had put his confidant into a marriage of inconvenience with Alienore Shibola to procedure an legitimate heiress who had the royal blood of both Faris and Adelbide. However, when Adolphus discovered the extent of Faris' manipulation, he reluctantly allowed his own daughter to be executed for a crime she did not commit to ensure the Holy Grail of Eris was halted. Back in the present, Scarlett speaks to her father directly through Constance, assuring that she forgives him for what he did. Before Constance departs, Scarlett reminds her father of what her late mother had once said. Having found peace, Adolphus wishes Constance good luck in doing right by his deceased daughter's wishes.
10	"For the Future"; Transliteration: "Mirai no Tameni" (Japanese: 未来のために)	Shiba Kanta	Toshiaki Satō	Hitoyuki Matsui	March 12, 2026
Simon Darkian is arrested and Deborah confined to a convent. Randolph deduces Salvadore is hiding Ulysses in a dockyard owned by Kiara Grafton and goes to investigate with Constance. Randolph announces once Scarlett has her revenge, he will end his engagement to Constance. Deborah escapes and kidnaps Lucia. Meanwhile, Randolph and Constance are ambushed at the dockyard, but Randolph kills their ambushers. During the fight, Randolph and Constance realize they genuinely love each other. Elsewhere, Salvador stops Deborah from killing Lucia and has her beaten then sends her back to distract the authorities. San and Eularia deduce Faris' first prince Theophilis was not involved in Ulysses kidnapping, meaning it must have been second prince Roderick. As the explosives used during the ambush were supplied by Cecilia from Melvina Kingdom, Ernst is able to leverage an arms deal with them that will disadvantage Faris. Enrique smugly reveals to Cecilia he only married her for this exact reason. When Cecilia frames Constance for kidnapping Ulysses, Constance admits to the crime but names Daeg Gallus as her allies. As a result, Daeg Gallus pressures Prince John to order the immediate execution of Constance.
11	"Those Who Defy Fate"; Transliteration: "Unmei ni Aragau Mono-tachi" (Japanese: 運命にあらがう者たち)	Fumio Maezono	Kenichi Yamashita	Koichi Ohata	March 19, 2026
Constance requests her father disown her, but he refuses. While Kate and the Violet Association stage mass protests against Constance's execution, Scarlett visits Harmsworth, who can indeed see her, and requests his help. With Scarlett's help, he discovers Rufus is a mole. Meanwhile, Cecilia is furious when thousands of citizens and nobles sign a petition against Constance being executed. Cecilia then hears about Constance speaking to the dead and visits her to see if it is true. She recalls that when she was young, Rufus sought out her friend Cess at their orphanage to tell her that she might have been the illegitimate daughter of Viscount Luze. Cess realized too late Luze would cover this up, which ultimately resulted in her dying when the orphanage was burned down. Once Rufus discovered Cecilia's true identity, he offered her a chance to get revenge. In the present, Rufus decides to murder Lucia the same day as Constance's execution. Elsewhere, Harmsworth discovers the real Rufus died around when Scarlett was executed. San and Randolph proceed to spread a rumor Ernst has allied with Princess Alexandria, increasing her chances at becoming Queen. Brenda later visits Constance to tell her about the protests.
12	"The Final Chapter: At the Grand Merillian"; Transliteration: "Shūshō Guran Meriruan Nite" (Japanese: 終章・小宮殿(グラン・メリル = アン)にて)	Masahiko Watanabe	Kenichi Yamashita	Morita to Junpei	March 26, 2026
Harmsworth realizes Ulysses is in tunnels under the city. Meanwhile, Cecilia is killed after she sets Lucia and Ulysses free, reuniting with Cess in heaven. San and Eularia soon retrieve Lucia and Ulysses while Rufus is arrested. Randolph stops Constance's execution at the last second following Ulysses' arrival. San then reveals she is the real Princess Alexandria while Kendall reveals that thanks to Ernst's visit to Faris, the Farisian Council have elected Alexandria as Queen of Faris. One of Randolph's treasonous subordinates, Jeorg Gaina, commits suicide with a grenade in an attempt to kill Randolph and Constance as well, but Scarlett saves them. With her revenge complete, Scarlett gives Constance a tearful goodbye. Scarlett abruptly awakens on the day of her execution and realizes she dreamed of the future. Spotting the young Constance in the crowd, she promises to see her again. Back in the present, it is revealed that Alexandria was crowned, Daeg Gallus were arrested, Scarlett was posthumously pardoned, and Constance and Randolph began their lives as a legitimate engaged couple. When Pamela escapes and tries to murder Constance, Scarlett reappears and saves her, claiming she could not rest as her revenge is not over yet.

== See also ==
- Bonjin Tensei no Doryoku Musō, another light novel series illustrated by Yuunagi
- The Banished Court Magician Aims to Become the Strongest, another light novel series illustrated by Yuunagi
- The Insipid Prince's Furtive Grab for the Throne, another light novel series illustrated by Yuunagi
- The Reincarnation of the Strongest Exorcist in Another World, the bunkobon version of the novel series is also illustrated by Yuunagi
