= The Insipid Prince's Furtive Grab for the Throne =

Japanese light novel series

- First light novel volume cover

最強出涸らし皇子の暗躍帝位争い 無能を演じるSSランク皇子は皇位継承戦を影から支配する (Saikyō Degarashi Ōji no Anyaku Teii Arasoi: Munō o Enjiru SS Rank Ōji wa Kōi Keishōsen wo Kage kara Shihai suru)
- Genre: Fantasy
- Novel series
- Written by: Tanba
- Published by: Shōsetsuka ni Narō
- Original run: February 3, 2019 – February 4, 2024
- Light novel
- Written by: Tanba
- Illustrated by: Yuunagi
- Published by: Kadokawa Shoten
- English publisher: NA: Kadokawa
- Imprint: Kadokawa Sneaker Bunko
- Original run: September 1, 2019 – present
- Volumes: 17
- Manga
- Written by: Tanba
- Illustrated by: Yukino Amagai
- Published by: Kadokawa Shoten
- English publisher: NA: Kadokawa
- Magazine: Young Ace Up
- Original run: December 25, 2019 – present
- Volumes: 10
- Anime television series
- Directed by: Yūji Yanase
- Written by: Kazuyuki Fudeyasu
- Music by: Akki
- Studio: Maho Film
- Licensed by: Crunchyroll
- Original network: Tokyo MX, BS Fuji
- Original run: July 6, 2026 – September 21, 2026
- Episodes: 12
- icon

The Insipid Prince's Furtive Grab for the Throne (Japanese: 最強出涸らし皇子の暗躍帝位争い 無能を演じるSSランク皇子は皇位継承戦を影から支配する, Hepburn: Saikyō Degarashi Ōji no Anyaku Teii Arasoi: Munō o Enjiru SS Rank Ōji wa Kōi Keishōsen wo Kage kara Shihai suru) is a Japanese light novel series written by Tanba and illustrated by Yuunagi. It was serialized online from February 2019 to February 2024 on the user-generated novel publishing website Shōsetsuka ni Narō and later acquired by Kadokawa Shoten under their Kadokawa Sneaker Bunko imprint since September 2019. A manga adaptation with art by Yukino Amagai has been serialized online via Kadokawa Shoten's Young Ace Up website since December 2019. Both the light novel and manga have been licensed in North America by Kadokawa. An anime television series adaptation produced by Maho Film aired from July to September 2026.

== Plot ==
In the Ardrasia Empire, after the death of the crown prince in battle, the struggle for the throne among the princes has become heated. Since losing the struggle for the throne could even cost one's life, the lower-ranking princes are constantly at risk of assassination. The seventh prince of the Ardrasia Empire, Arnold Lakes Adler, continued to be incompetent and he is mocked by the nobles as the "leftover prince" because his twin brother, the eighth prince Leonard, had stolen all of his good qualities. However, Arnold is actually the strongest prince, and his secret identity is "Silver", a skilled SS-rank adventurer who hides his face behind a mask and completes difficult requests using powerful magic. Arnold has no intention of becoming emperor, so in order to protect his own life, he secretly works behind the scenes to support his younger brother Leo, whom he believes is more worthy of the throne.

== Characters ==
Arnold Lakes Adler (アルノルト・レークス・アードラー, Arunoruto Rēkusu Ādorā)
Voiced by: Yoshitsugu Matsuoka (PV), Yuma Uchida (anime)
Leonard Lakes Adler (レオナルト・レークス・アードラー, Reonaruto Rēkusu Ādorā)
Voiced by: Kikunosuke Toya (anime)
Finne von Kleinert (フィーネ・フォン・クライネルト, Fīne fon Kuraineruto)
Voiced by: Ai Kayano (PV), Manaka Iwami (anime)
Elna von Amsberg (エルナ・フォン・アムスベルグ, Eruna fon Amusuberugu)
Voiced by: Maaya Uchida (anime)
Lynfia (リンフィア, Rinfia)
Voiced by: Kaede Hondo (anime)
Eric Lakes Adler (エリク・レークス・アードラー, Eriku Rēkusu Ādorā)
Voiced by: Atsushi Tamaru (anime)
Gordon Lakes Adler (ゴードン・レークス・アードラー, Gōdon Rēkusu Ādorā)
Voiced by: Ryōta Takeuchi (anime)
Zandora Lakes Adler (ザンドラ・レークス・アードラー, Zandora Rēkusu Ādorā)
Voiced by: Mitsuki Saiga (anime)
Johannes Lakes Adler (ヨハネス・レークス・アードラー, Yohanesu Rēkusu Ādorā)
Voiced by: Kazuhiko Inoue (anime)
Christa Lakes Adler (クリスタ・レークス・アードラー, Kurisuta Rēkusu Ādorā)
Voiced by: Yūki Kuwahara (anime)
Sebastian (セバスチャン, Sebasuchan)
Voiced by: Masahiko Tanaka (anime)
Traugott Lakes Adler (トラウゴッド・レークス・アードラ, Toraugoddo Rēkusu Ādorā)
Voiced by: Yoshitsugu Matsuoka (anime)
Mitsuba (ミツバ)
Voiced by: Ai Kayano (anime)

== Media ==
=== Light novels ===
Written by Tanba, The Insipid Prince's Furtive Grab for the Throne began serialization as a web novel published on the user-generated novel publishing website Shōsetsuka ni Narō from February 3, 2019, to February 4, 2024. It was later acquired and published by Kadokawa Shoten as a light novel with illustrations by Yuunagi under their Kadokawa Sneaker Bunko imprint since September 1, 2019. Seventeen volumes have been released as of July 2026. The light novel is published digitally in English on Kadokawa's BookWalker website.

No.	Release date	ISBN
1	September 1, 2019	978-4-04-108526-4
2	January 1, 2020	978-4-04-108530-1
3	May 5, 2020	978-4-04-109169-2
4	August 1, 2020	978-4-04-109170-8
5	December 26, 2020	978-4-04-110950-2
6	February 27, 2021	978-4-04-110951-9
7	July 1, 2021	978-4-04-111503-9
8	December 1, 2021	978-4-04-111504-6
9	April 1, 2022	978-4-04-112422-2
10	September 30, 2022	978-4-04-112779-7
11	March 31, 2023	978-4-04-112784-1
12	September 29, 2023	978-4-04-114180-9
13	March 29, 2024	978-4-04-114773-3
14	March 1, 2025	978-4-04-115994-1
15	August 29, 2025	978-4-04-116569-0
16	April 1, 2026	978-4-04-117274-2
17	July 1, 2026	978-4-04-117511-8

=== Manga ===
A manga adaptation illustrated by Yukino Amagai began serialization on Kadokawa Shoten's Young Ace Up manga website on December 25, 2019. Ten tankōbon volumes have been released as of July 2026. The manga adaptation is also published digitally in English on Kadokawa's BookWalker website.

No.	Release date	ISBN
1	May 2, 2020	978-4-04-109365-8
2	January 9, 2021	978-4-04-109366-5
3	September 10, 2021	978-4-04-111698-2
4	April 8, 2022	978-4-04-111699-9
5	November 10, 2022	978-4-04-112963-0
6	July 10, 2023	978-4-04-113814-4
7	March 8, 2024	978-4-04-114510-4
8	March 10, 2025	978-4-04-115485-4
9	November 10, 2025	978-4-04-116612-3
10	July 10, 2026	978-4-04-117482-1

=== Anime ===
An anime adaptation was announced during Kadokawa's "Sneaker Bunko 35th Anniversary Festa!" livestream on September 24, 2023, which was later confirmed to be a television series that will be produced by Maho Film and directed by Yūji Yanase, with Kazuyuki Fudeyasu handling series composition, Kazuko Tadano designing the characters, and Akki composing the music. The series aired from July 6 to September 21, 2026, on Tokyo MX and BS Fuji. The opening theme song is "Script", performed by Buddiis, while the ending theme song is "Suteki na Kanchigai" (素敵なかんちがい; A Wonderful Mistake), performed by Kurawan. Crunchyroll is streaming the series.

==== Episodes ====
No.	Title	Directed by (Note: Production staff information is taken from the ending credits of each episode.)	Written by	Storyboarded by	Original release date
1	"The Insipid Prince"; Transliteration: "Degarashi Ōji" (Japanese: 出涸らし皇子)	Yūji Yanase	Kazuyuki Fudeyasu	Yūji Yanase	July 6, 2026
Arnold, seventh prince of the Adresia Empire, is mocked as the "Insipid Prince" as his twin, Leonard, is deemed the only one with any talent. In truth, Arnold is secretly the empire's strongest prince, operating under the alias of SS-Class adventurer Silver. When first prince Dominik is assassinated, a deadly battle over succession begins. Lacking imperial ambitions, Arnold backs Leonard to become the new heir but continues to hide his Silver persona as Silver uses Ancient Magic, a taboo among royalty due to a past family tragedy. Seeking the support of the neutral Duke Kleinert, whose lands face a slime infestation, Arnold visits as Silver, but Kleinert's son rudely sends him away. He returns as himself, claiming Leonard sent Silver to clear the slimes and faking outrage at Silver's treatment. The apologetic Duke and his beautiful daughter, Finne, attempt to apologise. Using illusion magic, Arnold fakes a meeting between himself, Silver, and Finne, successfully trading Silver's slime extermination for Kleinert’s support of Leonard. After negotiating to take over the slime quest from A Rank adventurer Abel and his party, Arnold returns to Kleinert's mansion. However, Finne accidentally sees him changing his costume with magic and realises Arnold is Silver.
2	"Date at the Capital?"; Transliteration: "Teito de Dēto?" (Japanese: 帝都でデート？)	Akizumi Kaneko	Kazuyuki Fudeyasu	Yūji Yanase	July 13, 2026
Finne deduces Arnold is Silver to support Leonard, proving he is actually kind, so she keeps his secret. At Finne's request, Kleinert asks Arnold to employ Finne; her popularity with the emperor making her a valuable asset for Leonard. Since Leonard is unaware Arnold is Silver, Arnold convinces him Silver is an ally, albeit a distant one he will likely never meet in person. Leonard assigns Finne as a negotiator. Leonard explains most nobles already support their three powerful siblings: Erik the genius civil-servant, Gordon the military commander, and Zandra the mage. Later, manipulated by his butler Sebas, Arnold reluctantly agrees to show Finne around the capital, warning her to beware of manipulative nobles trying to become her friend. A shopkeeper mistakes them for a couple, embarrassing them. Soon after, the pompous Ghido Holzwirt bullies Arnold for being the talentless prince. Finne convinces Ghido that Arnold is actually Leonard in disguise. Terrified over bullying the important Prince Leonard, Ghido flees. Though Arnold forgives Finne, he is frustrated the rumour of Leonard masquerading as him might compromise his secret operations and draw Ghido’s resentment towards Finne. The emperor summons the princes and princesses for a family meeting.
3	"Elna Attacks"; Transliteration: "Eruna Shūrai" (Japanese: エルナ襲来)	Akira Katō	Kazuyuki Fudeyasu	Takeshi Mori	July 20, 2026
Emperor Johannes and Chancellor Franz announce a contest for the title of Ambassador Extraordinary. During the Knight's Festival of the Hunt, the siblings will each lead a regiment to hunt rare monsters. Arnold fears if Erik, Gordon, or Zandra wins, they will force Leonard out of the imperial succession. However, helping Leonard is difficult, as Arnold must maintain his "Insipid Prince" façade and cannot use his abilities. Sebas continues pushing for a romance between Arnold and Finne. Operating as Silver, Arnold kills an AAA-class Cerberus for the guild and encounters Elna Armsberg, Commander of the Third Regiment. Knowing her as a childhood headache and the only person who makes him nervous, Arnold provokes her while under guild protection so she cannot retaliate. Elna retreats, swearing revenge on Silver. Arnold is later horrified to learn Elna and her regiment have been assigned to him for the hunt. She teases him, vowing to end his "Insipid Prince" reputation, and leaves him exhausted after brutal training. Sebas reveals to Finne that while Arnold excels at Ancient Magic, he is pathetically weak when he cannot use it. Finne wonders if Elna is just acting out of concern for him. Arnold visits a secret room where a six-inch-tall man he calls "Grandpa" researches Ancient Magic.
4	"In Town, The Night Before the Knights Festival of the Hunt"; Transliteration: "Kishi Shuryō-sai, Zen'ya no Machi de" (Japanese: 騎士狩猟祭、前夜の町で)	Kyōhei Ōyabu	Kazuyuki Fudeyasu	Takeshi Mori	July 27, 2026
The man is revealed to be the soul of Arnold's great-grandfather, former Emperor Gustaf. His research into Ancient Magic caused an accident where a demon stole his body, prompting the disaster that made Ancient Magic taboo, and bound his soul to a grimoire. Gustaf suspects Crown Prince Wilhelm was assassinated by a sibling, or even Emperor Johannes, and believes a royal is using the monster-attracting "Hamelin Pipe" for a purpose beyond just winning the hunt. After capturing an assassin sent by Zandra to injure him before the hunt, Arnold learns from Sebas that the hunt will occur in Keel, the Empire's largest town. While exploring Keel with Finne, Arnold meets Leonard, who is investigating a surge in local thefts. Two rat-like Bletts steal Finne's unique Blau Mowe hairpin, a gift from the Emperor, leading Arnold to deduce the thieves trained the creatures using sound-storing Phonostones. Posing as Leonard, Arnold directs the knights to the thieves' hideout so Leonard receives full credit for solving the crime. The hairpin is recovered, and Finne ensures the Bletts are returned safely to the forest. Upset that Arnold’s heroism goes unrecognized, Finne decides to record his good deeds in a book so future generations will know the truth about him.
5	"The Knights' Festival of the Hunt Part 1"; Transliteration: "Kishi Shuryō-sai・Zenpen" (Japanese: 騎士狩猟祭・前編)	Yutaka Terasaki	Kazuyuki Fudeyasu	Takaaki Ishiyama	August 3, 2026
Two sinister men supply Prince Karlos with the Hamelin Pipe. For the hunt all participating siblings wear tracking bracelets to prevent cheating. Young siblings Krista and Rupert remain in Keel for safety. Krista, blessed with foresight, warns Arnold monsters will infiltrate Keel. Supported by Elna, Arnold takes an early lead. He explains to Elna that his partnership with her made him an assassination target for rival siblings competing for Ambassador Extraordinary, meaning she could also be targeted. By day three, Karlos takes first place, confirming to Arnold that Karlos is using the Pipe under someone else's manipulation. When Krista's predicted monster stampede threatens Keel, Arnold intentionally breaks his bracelet to forfeit the competition and sends Elna and his regiment to protect Keel, freeing him to operate in secret as Silver. Johannes is attacked by criminal vampire brothers Sam and Dean. Karlos pretends to save Johannes as part of his deal with Sam and Dean that they would pretend to run away to make him look heroic. When Sam and Dean betray him to try murder Johannes, Elna arrives in time. As Silver, Arnold convinces Leonard not to rush blindly to Keel. Instead, using his portal magic, they gather 3,000 knights from seven neighbouring cities who gladly answer the call as Arnold had previously visited them disguised as Leonard to build his brother's popularity.
6	"The Knights' Festival of the Hunt Part 2"; Transliteration: "Kishi Shuryō-sai・Kōhen" (Japanese: 騎士狩猟祭・後編)	Naoyoshi Kusaka	Kazuyuki Fudeyasu	Takeshi Mori	August 10, 2026
Krista foresees the flute falling past their window. As predicted, Elna makes Dean drop the flute which Finne catches and throws to Elna. Dean collapses the tower, sending Finne falling, but Silver saves her. Leonard arrives with knights to battle the monsters and rescue Johannes. Silver casts two barriers: one heals injured humans, and the other chains down the monsters and Sam and Dean. Stripped of their magic, Sam is executed by Elna using the holy sword Aurora, while Silver destroys Dean and the monsters with ancient magic. Elna grudgingly thanks Silver for saving Finne, whom she knows is precious to Arnold. Three days later, Johannes reveals Karlos confessed to plotting with Sam and Dean. Erik, Gordon, and Zandra plead for mercy for Karlos, but Leonard urges execution for treason. Impressed by Leonard's dedication to justice and the law, Johannes spares Karlos anyway but names Leonard the Hunt victor and the new Ambassador Extraordinary for rallying the knights. At Elna's request, Johannes awards Arnold second place, appointing him Lieutenant-Ambassador Extraordinary despite Arnold's protests. Later, Finne nurses a recovering Arnold, who asks her to avoid future danger for his sanity. After Arnold falls asleep from her medicated tea, Finne confesses she has loved him since they met as children, and kisses his cheek.
7	"Furtive Activities and Engagements"; Transliteration: "An'yaku to Kon'yaku" (Japanese: 暗躍と婚約)	Akizumi Kaneko	Toshima Hara	Takeshi Mori	August 17, 2026
Mitsuba, Johannes’s sixth wife and mother to Arnold, Leonard, and Krista, wonders if Arnold will marry Finne, but he maintains their bond is purely professional. Recognizing that Erik, Gordon, and Zandra pose a threat to Mitsuba and Krista, Arnold decides to recruit neutral nobles to Leonard's faction. He starts by assisting Count Baelz, Vice-Minister of Industry, in petitioning Johannes for a divorce from his unfaithful wife, Bettina. Bettina is secretly Zandra’s distant relative, placed in Baelz's life to ruin him financially and have an affair with his boss, the Minister. Zandra planned to expose the affair so Johannes would name Baelz the new Minister, and secure his loyalty by assisting in his divorce. By doing this himself before Zandra could, Arnold turns Zandra’s years of scheming to his own advantage. Johannes, seeing through Arnold’s harmless facade, approves the divorce and elevates Baelz just to see what Arnold does next. Anticipating Zandra’s retaliation while he and Leonard travel abroad on ambassadorial duties, Arnold sends Finne to Duchess Anna’s estate. Anna pushes for Arnold to marry her daughter Elna, which he declines. Anna agrees to shelter Finne temporarily, as Elna has been appointed Leonard’s security detail. Arnold survives an ambush by Zandra’s assassins thanks to Lynphia, an adventurer from Abel's party, seeking aid for villagers kidnapped from her hometown. Arnold hires guards for her village in exchange for Lynphia protecting Finne in his absence.
8	"Shelter from the Rain"; Transliteration: "Amayadori" (Japanese: 雨宿り)	Yūji Yanase	Yui Fukuo	Yūji Yanase	August 24, 2026
After entrusting Finne to Lynphia, Arnold surprises Elna by asking her to lunch. Elna insists on visiting their childhood haunts, though they only recall memories of bullies, extreme training, and Elna beating him up. When rain hits, Elna insists on sheltering in an inn they once frequented, despite Arnold warning her it is now a love hotel. Inside, they shower separately using a bathroom with glass walls. Though Arnold faces the other way, a mirror accidentally reveals Elna’s reflection, embarrassing him, while Elna fumes that he didn't try to peek. Elna then demands to know which women Arnold previously brought there. He admits to occasionally hiring prostitutes for entire days, not for sex, but to grant them a rare day of freedom from their harsh lives. Impressed yet embarrassed by her earlier assumptions, Elna returns home. Arnold and Leonard set sail for the Rondine Duchy, leaving Finne with Lynphia and Mary. A terrified Elna hides in Arnold’s bed the entire voyage, secretly terrified of water after nearly drowning Arnold as children. Their journey is interrupted by an Albatro Duchy ship. With Leonard seasick, Arnold impersonates him to meet Princess Evangelina and her brother Julio. Evangelina allows them passage to Rondine via a longer route so they do not enter Albatro's ocean. Suddenly, an unnatural storm separates Arnold's and Leonard's ships, leaving Arnold convinced a Sea Dragon is involved.
9	"Switching Places, and the Struggles of Arnold"; Transliteration: "Irekawari to Arunoruto no Kunō" (Japanese: 入れ替わりと、アルノルトの苦悩)	Kyōhei Ōyabu	Kazuyuki Fudeyasu	Takaaki Ishiyama	August 31, 2026
It is shown Evangelina and Julio accidentally awoke the Sea Dragon, triggering the violent storm. Still posing as Leonard, Arnold orders a rescue operation for their shipwrecked crew and dumps diplomatic cargo intended for Rondine overboard to clear space. When a weakening Julio sinks, Arnold jumps in to save him, prompting Elna's Vice-captain Marc to tease Arnold about rescuing him from the water for a second time, as he was the one rescued Arnold when Elna almost drowned him in the bath. With many crew members injured, Arnold sails for Albatro under a white flag of surrender to secure immediate medical aid. This historic act of an Imperial prince surrendering to save enemy lives earns "Leonard" widespread respect from the Albatro military. Meanwhile, on Arnold’s ship, the real Leonard successfully acts like Arnold and orders the ship continue toward Rondine. Zandra is prevented from retaliating against Leonard and Arnold due to new attacks against her from Gordon. Behind the scenes, Lynphia manipulates Zandra and Gordon into targeting each other rather than Finne. Aiming to support the brothers, Finne and Lynphia seek an alliance with Demi-humans Inc., a vampire-owned merchant company overlooked by rival royals due to recent anti-vampire sentiment, caused by the actions of Sam and Dean.
10	"Each of Their Roles"; Transliteration: "Sorezore no Yakuwari" (Japanese: それぞれの役割)	Naoyoshi Kusaka	Kazuyuki Fudeyasu	Takeshi Mori	September 7, 2026
Grand Duke Donato thanks "Leonard" for rescuing his sailors, offering supplies and diplomatic gifts to replace those thrown overboard. Donato reveals the sea dragon, Leviatano, was put to sleep 200 years ago by a royal staff whose jewel recently broke, prompting Evangelina and Julio to check if it had awoken. Fearing bankruptcy if sea-trade stops, "Leonard" suggests a truce with Rondine, with himself acting as impartial mediator. Meanwhile, Arnold realizes Evangelina loves "Leonard" after being rescued by him. In Rondine, "Arnold" and Elna deliver Johannes's message of minor support to Grand Duke Carlo, offering Elna to train their troops. Seeing the aggressive training, Leonard sympathizes with Arnold's daily struggles with Elna. Donato agrees to let "Leonard" negotiate peace. Before departing, Julio asks "Leonard" how to be a good prince, receiving advice to always do what he thinks is right. On the way to Rondine, "Leonard" encounters Leviatano, and the crew prays it will ignore them as they sail past. Elsewhere, Finne and Lynphia meet Yuria, owner of Demi-Humans Inc. Impressed that Finne waited all day while messengers from Erik, Zandra and Gordon grew impatient and left, , Yuria pledges gold to Leonard and Arnold, and to sabotage the merchants supporting Erik, Zandra and Gordon.
11	"Leviatano Roars"; Transliteration: "Reviatāno, Hōkō" (Japanese: レヴィアターノ、咆哮)	Yūji Yanase & Yūko Ōba	Kazuyuki Fudeyasu	Takeshi Mori	September 14, 2026
Nearing Rondine, Arnold rescues Leonard’s struggling crew from a sea serpent. Maintaining his disguise as Leonard, Arnold warns Duke Carlo about Leviatano, prompting Carlo to agree to a ceasefire with Albatro so they can fight the beast together and protect both seafaring kingdoms. Arnold secretly teleports home and as Silver, accepts Donato's quest to slay Leviatano. After learning about Finne offering herself to a vampire, Arnold begs her to stay safe, confessing she is his most treasured person. Silver and Finne petition fourth prince Traugott to travel south to authorize Elna to use her Holy Sword outside the Empire, avoiding the complications of involving the Imperial army. Gordon and Zandra insist the honour should be theirs, but Johannes authorises Traugott to go, realizing a politically unambitious prince is the smartest choice given the current situation. Leonard watches the historic ceasefire declaration between Donato and Carlo, while Elna is annoyed that Arnold is "sleeping" through it. As Leviatano launches a direct assault on Albatro, the two Dukes personally lead their fleets into battle. Elna despairs over being forbidden to use her Holy Sword outside the Empire, just as Silver and Traugott teleport in to assist.
12	"Final Battle! Leviatano"; Transliteration: "Kessen! Reviatāno" (Japanese: 決戦！レヴィアターノ)	Yūji Yanase	Kazuyuki Fudeyasu	Yūji Yanase	September 21, 2026
Broadcast live, Silver arrives in Albatro and promises Evangelina he will slay Leviatano. Julio provokes Leviatano with the sealing staff, but Silver intercepts the attack. Traugott orders Elna to wield the Holy Sword Aurora. Silver and Elna team up to strike Leviatano, allowing both fleets to safely retreat. When Leviatano retreats underwater, Elna's secret water phobia prevents her from pursuing. Silver drains the ocean with magic, enabling Elna to decapitate the beast on the ocean floor. To protect his identity, Silver claims Arnold told him about her phobia out of concern, which pleases Elna. Silver advises her to sell Leviatano's corpse to rebuild Albatro. Two weeks later, Donato and Carlo finalize a permanent ceasefire. Johannes publicly praises Leonard and Arnold, enraging Gordon, Zandra, and Erik. When Elna confronts Arnold for sharing her secret, he diffuses her anger by revealing a joint plot with "Silver" to make Leonard Emperor to protect their loved ones. Elna pledges her support despite her family's position of neutrality. While Finne laments that Arnold's actions as Silver will remain unsung, he is content with the right people knowing. Gordon and Zandra plot Leonard and Arnold’s assassination, while Erik waits to fight the victor. Arnold immediately begins his next secret scheme.

== Reception ==
By September 2023, the series has over 1 million copies in circulation.

== See also ==
- Bonjin Tensei no Doryoku Musō, another light novel series illustrated by Yuunagi
- The Banished Court Magician Aims to Become the Strongest, another light novel series illustrated by Yuunagi
- The Holy Grail of Eris, another light novel series illustrated by Yuunagi
- The Reincarnation of the Strongest Exorcist in Another World, the bunkobon version of the novel series is also illustrated by Yuunagi
