= Jutsu =

Japanese morpheme

Jutsu (術) ('technique', 'method', 'spell', 'skill' or 'trick') is a bound morpheme of the Sino-Japanese lexical stratum of the Japanese language. The moves in the following martial arts are called jutsu:

- Bajutsu, the skills of horse riding
- Battōjutsu (抜刀術, the art of drawing a sword)
- Bōjutsu, fighting with a staff or elongated blunt object
- Brazilian jiu-jitsu, a self-defense system popularised in Brazil and heavily influenced by judo
- Daitō-ryū Aiki-jūjutsu, the art of close combat
- Hōjutsu, use of firearms from close range
- Iaijutsu, the sword technique of a sudden mortal draw attack
- Jittejutsu, the Japanese martial art of using the Japanese weapon jitte
- Jūjutsu (柔術, unarmed fighting, including grapples instead of punches and kicks) "
- Kamajutsu, defense and combat with metal sickles (kama)
- Kenjutsu, the art of sword fighting
- Kusarigamajutsu, fighting with kusarigama
- Kayakujutsu, Art of gunpowder
- Kyujutsu, the art of the bow
- Naginatajutsu, the art of using a naginata
- Ninjutsu, Shinobi combat techniques and practices
- Saijutsu (釵術), fighting with sai daggers
- Shurikenjutsu, the practice of throwing blades
- Sōjutsu, the practice of using a spear
- Taijutsu, unarmed fighting style
- Tantojutsu, the technique of using a small blade or dagger
- Tessenjutsu, fighting with the deceptive metal fan
- Tonfajutsu, fighting with blunt tonfa weapons
- Genjutsu, art of illusion

== See also ==
- The Jitsu Foundation
