= The Reincarnation of the Strongest Exorcist in Another World =

Japanese light novel series and its adaptations

- First light novel volume cover

最強陰陽師の異世界転生記 ～下僕の妖怪どもに比べてモンスターが弱すぎるんだが～ (Saikyō Onmyōji no Isekai Tenseiki: Geboku no Yōkai-domo ni Kurabete Monsutā ga Yowasugiru n Da ga)
- Genre: Isekai
- Novel series
- Written by: Kiichi Kosuzu
- Published by: Shōsetsuka ni Narō
- Original run: December 2018 – present
- Light novel
- Written by: Kiichi Kosuzu
- Illustrated by: Shiso (volume 1) (M Novels); Kihiro Yuzuki (volume 2–5) (M Novels); Yuunagi (Monster Bunko)
- Published by: Futabasha
- English publisher: NA: J-Novel Club
- Imprint: M Novels (original print); Monster Bunko (reprint)
- Original run: July 31, 2019 – present
- Volumes: 5 (M Novels); 8 (Monster Bunko)
- Manga
- Written by: Kiichi Kosuzu
- Illustrated by: Toshinori Okazaki
- Published by: Futabasha
- English publisher: NA: J-Novel Club
- Imprint: Monster Comics
- Magazine: Gaugau Monster
- Original run: May 2020 – present
- Volumes: 12
- Anime television series
- Directed by: Nobuyoshi Nagayama (Note: Credited as Chief Director (総監督, Sō Kantoku).); Ryōsuke Shibuya
- Written by: Touko Machida
- Music by: Alisa Okehazama
- Studio: Studio Blanc
- Licensed by: Crunchyroll
- Original network: AT-X, Tokyo MX, BS11
- Original run: January 7, 2023 – April 1, 2023
- Episodes: 13
- icon

The Reincarnation of the Strongest Exorcist in Another World (最強陰陽師の異世界転生記 ～下僕の妖怪どもに比べてモンスターが弱すぎるんだが～, Saikyō Onmyōji no Isekai Tenseiki: Geboku no Yōkai-domo ni Kurabete Monsutā ga Yowasugirun Daga; "A Record of the Strongest Onmyōji's Reincarnation to Another World: These Monsters Are Too Weak Compared to My Yōkai") is a Japanese light novel series written by Kiichi Kosuzu and illustrated by Shiso (first volume) and Kihiro Yuzuki (from second volume). It began serialization online in December 2018 on the user-generated novel publishing website Shōsetsuka ni Narō. It was later acquired by Futabasha, who have published five volumes since July 2019 under their M Novels imprint. They later republished the series with Yuunagi as the new illustrator since July 2022 under their Monster Bunko label. A manga adaptation with art by Toshinori Okazaki has been serialized online via Futabasha's Gaugau Monster website since May 2020. It has been collected in twelve tankōbon volumes. An anime television series adaptation produced by Studio Blanc aired from January to April 2023.

== Premise ==
Powerful exorcist Haruyoshi Kugano is betrayed and fatally wounded by his student. Using a reincarnation spell to be reborn, Haruyoshi vows to become unbeatable in his new life. However, his spell goes awry; rather than being reborn in Japan, his soul ends up in another world similar to premodern Europe. Reborn as Seika Lamprogue, he sees the world uses magic that functions differently than his art, though this doesn't deter him from his plans. He now just wants a peaceful life, but his curiosity and compassion repeatedly lead him into trouble.

== Characters ==
Seika Lamprogue (セイカ・ランプローグ, Seika Ranpurōgu)
Voiced by: Yumiri Hanamori (Japanese); Marianne Bray (English)
A powerful exorcist reborn into a world of magic. As his spirit is not native to it, he lacks any magical power. Instead, he uses talismans and jutsu to manipulate the six elements—Water, Fire, Earth, Air, Light, and Shadow—and spells/curses leaving everyone confused because they have no concept of his mystical techniques.
According to Zor's status vision, Seika is the labeled "Most Terrible Demon King"; heavily implying Haruyoshi's soul took the vessel meant for the Demon King to reincarnate. Leaving possibility both Seika and the true Demon King were reborn in the wrong bodies.
Seika loathes politics and nobles, as he and his loved ones in both lives are constantly harassed by them.
Yifa (イーファ, Īfa)
Voiced by: Azumi Waki (Japanese); Leo Matthews (English)
Seika's childhood personal servant. Yifa loves Seika, who treated her as family and nurtured her magical talent; even if anyone warns her about his power, Yifa refuses to see him as a bad person. Yifa is descended from elves, explaining her innate connection to elemental spirits
Amyu (アミュ, Amyu)
Voiced by: Nene Hieda (Japanese); Luci Christian (English)
She is the current Hero, but her powers haven't been awoken due to Seika protecting her. Both humanity and demonkind want her dead to maintain the peaceful stalemate between their races; many would try using Maybell for human supremacy.
Amyu has a strong love of adventuring, but has a perverted imagination about Seika's intentions. She develops a fondness for Seika after he saves her life; trusting him as a fellow combatant.
Haruyoshi Kugano (玖峨晴嘉, Kugano Haruyoshi)
Voiced by: Yūichirō Umehara (Japanese); Jim Foronda (English)
Seika's original life. An exorcist who died after being betrayed by his trusted student. In his life, he sealed and tamed numerous ayakashi. His image and voice appeared during Seika's curse reflection spell.
Mabel Crane (メイベル・クレイン, Meiberu Kurein)
Voiced by: Akari Kitō (Japanese); Marisa Duran (English)
Originally an orphan mercenary, hired by the school as a fake hero to hide Amyu; so she would die in combat to appease the demons' fear. However, Seika defeated her and Mabel was adopted into the noble Crane family thanks to the principal.
Yuki (ユキ)
Voiced by: Yui Ogura (Japanese); Lisette Monique Diaz (English)
A weasel demon Seika sealed in his past life; for an unknown reason, her human form is now a little girl. Yuki could recognize Seika as her master due to his soul.
Fiona Urd Alegreif (フィオナ・ウルド・エールグライフ, Fiona Urudo Ēruguraifu)
Voiced by: Kaede Hondo
Known as the holy princess (due to being born of a saint and her father the king), she has the gift of foresight; allowing her to masterfully plan out strategies to advance her position in politics. Fiona sees Seika as the Demon King, unaware his soul is that of a human from another world.
Kairu (カイル)
Voiced by: Yoshitsugu Matsuoka
Cecilio Astilia (セシリオ・アスティリア, Seshirio Asutiria)
Voiced by: Gakuto Kajiwara (Japanese); Justin Briner (English)
Prince of a neighboring kingdom. Despite his genuine kind intentions, Cecilio is unfortunately an idiot unable to think complex ideas and is unable to accept when he's wrong.
Rize (リゼ)
Voiced by: Rina Satō
Zolemnem (ゾルレンム)
Voiced by: Takehito Koyasu

== Media ==
=== Light novel ===
The series written by Kiichi Kosuzu began serialization online in December 2018 on the user-generated novel publishing website Shōsetsuka ni Narō. It was later acquired by Futabasha, who have published the series as a light novel with illustrations by Shiso (first volume) and Kihiro Yuzuki (from second volume) in six volumes since July 31, 2019, under their M Novels imprint. Futabasha republished the series with Yuunagi as the new illustrator since July 2022 under its Monster Bunko label. The light novels are licensed in English by J-Novel Club.

No.	Original release date	Original ISBN	English release date	English ISBN
1	July 31, 2019 (M Novels); July 29, 2022 (Monster Bunko)	978-4-575-24194-5 (M Novels); 978-4-575-75309-7 (Monster Bunko)	August 16, 2024	978-1-7183-1850-2
2	February 29, 2020 (M Novels); August 29, 2022 (Monster Bunko)	978-4-575-24255-3 (M Novels); 978-4-575-75312-7 (Monster Bunko)	November 15, 2024	978-1-7183-1852-6
3	June 30, 2020 (M Novels); September 30, 2022 (Monster Bunko)	978-4-575-24294-2 (M Novels); 978-4-575-75314-1 (Monster Bunko)	February 2, 2025	978-1-7183-1854-0
4	December 28, 2020 (M Novels); December 28, 2022 (Monster Bunko)	978-4-575-24361-1 (M Novels); 978-4-575-75319-6 (Monster Bunko)	April 18, 2025	978-1-7183-1856-4
5	October 29, 2021 (M Novels); April 28, 2023 (Monster Bunko)	978-4-575-24460-1 (M Novels); 978-4-575-75323-3 (Monster Bunko)	July 7, 2025	978-1-7183-1858-8
6	July 28, 2023 (Monster Bunko)	978-4-575-75329-5 (Monster Bunko)	November 28, 2025	978-1-7183-1860-1
7	January 30, 2024 (Monster Bunko)	978-4-575-75334-9 (Monster Bunko)	February 11, 2026	978-1-7183-1862-5
8	January 30, 2025 (Monster Bunko)	978-4-575-75349-3 (Monster Bunko)	April 29, 2026	978-1-7183-1864-9

=== Manga ===
A manga adaptation with art by Toshinori Okazaki has been serialized online via Futabasha's Gaugau Monster website since May 2020. It has been collected in twelve tankōbon volumes. The manga adaptation is also licensed in English by J-Novel Club.

No.	Original release date	Original ISBN	English release date	English ISBN
1	July 30, 2020	978-4-575-41137-9	July 24, 2024	978-1-7183-3719-0
2	January 30, 2021	978-4-575-41201-7	September 11, 2024	978-1-7183-3720-6
3	July 30, 2021	978-4-575-41278-9	November 20, 2024	978-1-7183-3721-3
4	January 28, 2022	978-4-575-41358-8	February 12, 2025	978-1-7183-3722-0
5	July 29, 2022	978-4-575-41464-6	April 23, 2025	978-1-7183-3723-7
6	January 30, 2023	978-4-575-41578-0	July 2, 2025	978-1-7183-3724-4
7	August 30, 2023	978-4-575-41695-4	September 24, 2025	978-1-7183-3725-1
8	May 15, 2024	978-4-575-41835-4	March 11, 2026	978-1-7183-3726-8
9	November 15, 2024	978-4-575-42018-0	June 3, 2026	978-1-7183-3727-5
10	June 13, 2025	978-4-575-42171-2	—	—
11	December 15, 2025	978-4-575-42306-8	—	—
12	June 30, 2026	978-4-575-42451-5	—	—

=== Anime ===
On January 29, 2022, an anime adaptation was announced. It was later revealed to be a television series produced by Studio Blanc and directed by Ryōsuke Shibuya, with Nobuyoshi Nagayama serving as chief director, scripts written by Touko Machida, character designs handled by Masayoshi Kikuchi and Sayaka Ueno, and music composed by Alisa Okehazama. The series aired from January 7 to April 1, 2023, on AT-X and other networks. The opening theme song is "Reconnection" by Angela, while the ending theme song is "Link" (リンク, Rinku) by Azumi Waki, Nene Hieda, and Akari Kitō. Crunchyroll streamed the series.

No.	Title	Directed by (Note: Information is taken from the ending credits of each episode.)	Storyboarded by	Original release date
1	"The Strongest Exorcist"; Transliteration: "Saikyō no Onmyōji" (Japanese: 最強の陰陽師)	Ryōsuke Shibuya	Ryōsuke Shibuya	January 7, 2023
The strongest exorcist in the world is murdered by jealous members of the Imperial court due to his incredible power but casts a spell of rebirth on himself to have a second chance at a better life. He awakens in an alternate world as Seika, son of the noble Blaise Lamprogue, but cannot use this world's form of magic. However, Seika has retained his exorcist powers and demon servants but hides this from his family as he hopes to cultivate a happier life by becoming more cunning than his previous life. One of his brothers, Grey, bullies him as Seika was born from Blaise's mistress and can't use magic; his other brother Luft is kinder but his only friend is the family's slave Yifa. After learning about the Lodonea Magic Academy Seika uses his power over the six elements (Water, Fire, Earth, Air, Light and Shadow) to simulate magical power, so Blaise lets him study magic. Seika discovers Yifa can use magic by commanding the spirits of nature, so he trains her in secret. An Elder Newt attacks a nearby city and rampages all the way to their mansion. In front of dozens of witnesses Grey hides like a coward but Seika kills the monster with a poison curse disguised as fire magic.
2	"Academy City Lodonea"; Transliteration: "Gakuen Toshi Rodonea" (Japanese: 学園都市ロドネア)	Kazuya Ishiguri	Kazuya Ishiguri	January 14, 2023
Blaise offers Seika a reward so he asks to attend Lodonea with Yifa. Grey protests that he was supposed to attend Lodonea. Blaise decides Grey will instead enlist in the army. Luft is proud of Seika and gives him a pen as a parting gift. Grey challenges Seika for the place at Lodonia but is easily defeated. Seika is revealed to have cunningly arranged this outcome by sending a demon servant to provoke the Elder Newt to attack. As Seika and Yifa depart for the academy, Blaise recalls Seika isn't actually his son but his nephew, the son of his brother Gilbert who disappeared in demon territory. Blaise has long suspected Seika's mother was a demoness, meaning Seika has potential to become the next Demon King, though he hopes Lodonea will be the right environment to prevent this. With Seika now her owner Yifa expects to join him in bed but he shows no interest. At the entrance exam Seika encounters Amyu, a commoner girl with powerful magical abilities. Seika is surprised as Amyu is identical to his apprentice from his previous life who was pressured by the Imperial Court into killing him.
3	"The Hero the Oracles Spoke Of"; Transliteration: "Takusen no Yūsha" (Japanese: 託宣の勇者)	Kazuya Ishiguri	Kazuya Ishiguri	January 21, 2023
At the practical exam Yifa and Seika outperform everyone except Amyu who scores highest with all four elements, plus light and dark magic, causing her instructors to suspect she is the next Hero. Yifa is disappointed she is expected to live in the girls' dormitory and won't be allowed to serve Seika or enter the boys' dormitory. Seika notices a dark magic circle on academy grounds and leaves several talismans to keep an eye on it. During the opening ceremony, the circle summons three lesser demons to attack the academy. Seika slips away to confront the circle's creator, a devil named Galios. With no witnesses, Seika is able to freely use his exorcist powers and manipulates Galios into revealing he is trying to kill the Hero. Seika easily defeats Galios then feeds him alive to one of his demon servants, Mizuchi the Dragon. Seika finds that due to not having all his old strength, Mizuchi actually tries to kill him before being sealed away again. Amyu kills the lesser demons but this only causes people to regard her with fear and mistrust due to her power. Seika is pleased by this, hoping that by becoming the Hero's friend, he will stand out less compared to her and attract fewer enemies.
4	"Dungeon Trap"; Transliteration: "Danjon Torappu" (Japanese: ダンジョン・トラップ)	Kanae Aoki	Kanae Aoki	January 28, 2023
Despite Seika's efforts, Amyu has no interest in being friends. Seika and Yifa narrowly avoid being doused in demon blood by clumsy teacher Cordell. Amyu and Seika trip a magic circle trap and are transported into a nearby dungeon. Amyu is knocked unconscious by trolls, allowing Seika to freely summon a demon servant, the Giant Centipede, to kill them. Awoken, Amyu is grateful for the help but reveals she has a headache. Seika identifies this as a potentially fatal curse which he transfers onto one of his talismans, saving Amyu's life. Grateful, Amyu is shown to have a lewd sense of humour and a passion for fighting that most people find disturbing, though Seika assures her all passions have uses. After defeating the dungeon boss they loot a mithril sword for Amyu and a magic ring. After returning to the academy Seika secretly confronts Cordell, revealed to be a devil's servant sent to assassinate Amyu with a demon blood curse. Seika uses the substitute talisman to reflect Amyu's curse back on Cordell, killing him. Seika gives the dungeon ring to Yifa, confirming it increases her control over spirits. Amyu returns to treating Seika coldly, becoming friends with Yifa instead.
5	"Mabel Crane"; Transliteration: "Meiberu Kurein" (Japanese: メイベル・クレイン)	Tomari Kōki	Tomari Kōki	February 4, 2023
A whole year later, Seika, Amyu, and Yifa are best friends and there have been no further attempts to assassinate Amyu. The academy's Principal asks Seika to participate in a combat tournament in Capital City, along with new student Mabel Crane. Amyu is upset she wasn't chosen but the Principal insists on Seika and Mabel due to an ulterior motive. Mabel later provokes Amyu and defeats her in a sword duel, humiliating her. She also warns Seika that the tournament involves real combat so participants frequently die. Arriving in Capital City, Seika has his first match and defeats mercenary swordsman Dennis with a talisman disguised as wind magic. Joining Yifa and Amyu in the audience, Seika watches a match between Bellen, a student from another academy, and Kyle, a bodyguard from the Rugroc Merchants' Association. The audience is horrified as Kyle mercilessly kills Bellen, who makes no attempt to defend himself. With his expertise in curses, Seika realizes Bellen had actually been paralysed by Kyle's cursed Evil Eye, making the killing even worse as the paralysis by itself was enough to win the match. Seika suspects Kyle may be a Merchants' assassin.
6	"Interwoven Plots"; Transliteration: "Sorezore no Omowaku" (Japanese: それぞれの思惑)	Kiyoto Nakajima	Kiyoto Nakajima	February 11, 2023
After Mabel wins her first match, Seika is intrigued when the audience begin referring to Mabel as the Hero. That night Seika captures a demon's human spy and interrogates him with his psychic demon servant, Satori, learning he was sent to spy on Mabel whom the demons also believe to be the Hero from her birth date and red hair. After letting Satori eat the spy alive Seika is left confused; Amyu is undoubtedly the Hero so he suspects Mabel is at the centre of a conspiracy to make her appear to be the Hero, distracting the demons' attention away from Amyu. Kyle wins his next match with another merciless killing. The young knight Reinas becomes popular with the audience. Mabel warns Seika she absolutely must win the tournament so he must forfeit or she will have to kill him in the semi-finals. Kyle almost kills Reinas but is stopped by the judges who declare Kyle the winner just in time. Seika notices Kyle uses gravity magic just like Mabel. That night Mabel attacks Seika in his room and flees after failing to kill him. Intrigued, Seika chases her.
7	"Brother and Sister"; Transliteration: "Kyōdai" (Japanese: 兄妹)	Tomari Kōki	Tomari Kōki	February 18, 2023
Seika deduces Mabel was just trying to injure him enough to make him forfeit the match. Mabel confirms she and Kyle are slave soldiers from the Merchants' Association who ordered Mabel to let Kyle kill her, letting the demons believe the Hero had died while also demonstrating Kyle's value. During his training his brain was engraved with magic to make him a perfect soldier and if he kills the Hero he will prove his value. Seika deduces Mabel is Kyle's sister, having dyed her hair to pose as the Hero, and she actually intends to kill Kyle to end his suffering. Deciding he can't let Mabel kill her own brother, Seika defeats Mabel in their match and then afterwards defeats Kyle who asks Seika for Mabel's forgiveness, but a curse from the merchants kills Kyle for his failure. After Kyle's funeral Seika convinces Mabel to attend the academy as a real student. Seika congratulates the Principal for her scheme, knowing Seika would win thus depriving the Merchants of Kyle and gaining Mabel as a powerful student. Mabel returns to her original silver hair but is horrified by Seika and Yifa's sadistic tutoring to make up for being a whole year behind her classmates.
8	"Yifa's Feelings"; Transliteration: "Īfa no Omoi" (Japanese: イーファの想い)	Seung Deok Kim	Kanae Aoki	February 25, 2023
Seika is asked to investigate the strange behaviour of the neighboring Astelia Kingdom's guardian dragon, which has protected Astelia since a past queen helped raise it. Astelia's prince Cecilio, who is rather airheaded, is entranced by Yifa and invites her to join his kingdom's harem. Seika decides to let Yifa choose on her own since joining a royal harem is a rare honour. Arriving in Astelia, the dragon attacks their carriage but is driven away by Zecht, an arrogant mage mercenary Cecilio hired. Seika scolds Yifa for freezing during the attack when she is capable of defending herself. After investigating Astelia's royal library Seika learns the dragon became violent once before when he and his wife had a baby, which doesn't explain his current violence since his wife died decades ago. That night Cecilio summons Yifa to his room but she refuses and sleeps in Seika's bed, too scared to be alone. She feels worse when Seika reminds her the harem might be good for her future, even though she is clearly in love with Seika. Cecilio resorts to offering to buy Yifa as she is technically a slave, but Seika refuses. Seika decides to visit the dragons nest himself.
9	"Yifa's Resolve"; Transliteration: "Īfa no Ketsui" (Japanese: イーファの決意)	Shūji Miyazaki	Kazuya Ishiguri	March 4, 2023
Cecilio's elf attendant, Lize, reveals to Yifa she must have an elf ancestor to use spirit magic. Seika finds the dragon is aggressive due to having an egg, having become female after his wife's death. Lize shows Yifa the harem is actually a university for young ladies. One may become queen one day but most become government officials. The dragon lets Seika help care for the egg. Yifa decides to remain with Seika but Cecilio tries to force Yifa to sign all the legal papers, assuming he can just pay Seika for her later. Seika suddenly appears with the dragon and rescues her. Yifa helps Seika capture Zecht who tried to steal the egg to sell it. Cecilio decides to have the dragon killed anyway, hoping such a bold decision will strengthen his chance of becoming king. Fed up by Cecilio's idiocy Seika thoroughly scolds him over his treatment of Yifa. Lize actually agrees and apologises to Seika and Yifa. Cecilio is ashamed and lets the dragon live. Lize gifts Yifa several Light spirits that provide healing magic. They return to the academy but elsewhere a team of five powerful demons set out to finally kill the Hero.
10	"The Holy Princess"; Transliteration: "Seikōjo" (Japanese: 聖皇女)	Shigeki Awai	Tomari Kōki	March 11, 2023
Seika's father asks to meet Amyu. Seika is certain politics is involved. Grey reveals he loves it in the army but still demands a rematch with Seika. Amyu duels Grey instead but Grey wins by a trick. Grey introduces Fiona, the Kingdom's Holy Princess. Seika is again worried about politics as Fiona is the daughter of the Emperor and his mistress the Oracle Priestess. Seika realises Fiona resembles his wife from his past life. Seika is actually surprised his stepmother, who ignored him all his life, asks him to stay in touch. Amyu asks Seika about his plans after graduation and is surprised he intends to go adventuring with her. Fiona visits the nearby town and is curious about romance, holding Seika's hand all day. Fiona is almost hurt by falling timber but is saved by Grey and Amyu, though she seems upset Seika did nothing. Grey reveals to Seika that Fiona is a shrewd politician who inherited her mother's magic to see glimpses of the future. Despite being child of a mistress she has schemed her way into becoming a royal heir and may become Empress one day. She is also plotting something that involves both Amyu and Seika.
11	"Future Sight"; Transliteration: "Miraishi" (Japanese: 未来視)	Sumio Watanabe	Tomari Kōki	March 18, 2023
Seika avoids Fiona, cautious that her future visions may cause problems. Later, he relents and plays chess with Fiona who wins even though she willingly played with fewer pieces and as her prize asks Seika for a future favour. From her play style Seika learns she doesn't support the current political system and is purposefully making herself popular with the general public. Seika decides to support her. Elsewhere, the demons defeat a group of bandits and eat them, revealing their identities, Zor the Devil God, Muderev the Strongest Ogre, Lo-Ni the Monster Tamer, Pyrslaria the Evil Eye and Gull-Ganis the Devil. On their return to the academy assassins disguised as bandits attack the carriages to kill Fiona, but with Seika's assistance the assassins are captured alive. Fiona had foreseen the attack and will use the assassins' confessions against her political enemies. The assassins await help from their reinforcements, but Fiona had foreseen the reinforcements being eaten by the demons. Fiona arrives home and cryptically asks Seika to remember no matter her actions she is always on his side. Zor regrets having to hide from his team their goal of killing the hero is almost certainly a suicide mission.
12	"The Most Terrible Demon King"; Transliteration: "Saiaku no Maō" (Japanese: 最悪の魔王)	Ryōhei Endō; Lee Kisup	Nagisa Miyazaki	March 25, 2023
The Principal elects Seika as Student Representative to welcome the next first year students. Seika decides to abandon his fear of drawing attention, after dealing with the approaching demons. The demons arrive at the academy to slaughter the hero, but find the academy covered in a confusing red fog. Zor decides to abandon the mission, only for Seika to appear. Zor, who can see people's power, is terrified by Seika who beheads Muderev. Pyrslaria's evil eye is defeated by demon servant White Snake, whose own evil eye stops her heart. Lo-Ni attempts to tame White Snake but is eaten. Zor reveals Seika bears the title Most Terrible Demon King, hoping Gull-Ganis will escape to tell the other demons the prophesized Demon King is an ally of humanity. Zor is obliterated by Seika's fire magic and Gull-Ganis teleports away but dies when Seika uses a substitution talisman to stab him through the heart. Mabel, who saw everything, promises Seika she will keep it secret. At the ceremony to welcome new students the Dirac Knights of Marquis Grevil announce Amyu is under arrest for murdering a demon emissary who, at the time of his death, was visiting the academy under diplomatic immunity.
13	"A New Journey"; Transliteration: "Arata Naru Tabidachi" (Japanese: 新たなる旅立ち)	Kiyoto Nakajima	Hiroyuki Yamada	April 1, 2023
Seika advises Amyu to submit to imprisonment temporarily. The Principal confirms politicians likely want the hero gone. Seika invades the Imperial prison, slaughters the soldiers and finds Amyu. Amyu naively believes her innocence would be proven so Seika reveals to her she is the hero, so her innocence is irrelevant as her enemies will kill her regardless. Grey and Fiona appear and admit to plotting Amyu's death. Humans and demons are currently in a stalemate so the existence of a hero could restart the war so it is better for Amyu to die. However, due to Seika protecting her Amyu has not yet had to unlock her Hero abilities, so Fiona offers to return them to the academy. Seika realises this was what Fiona had cleverly planned all along and never intended Amyu to be killed, so he decides they will leave the academy and go far away instead. Amyu regrets not returning to the academy but looks forward to starting their careers as adventurers. Fiona talks with an entity hiding in her shadow, revealing she knows Seika is the demon king and will give his life to protect the hero. She also arranges for Yifa and Mabel to join Seika and Amyu and begin adventuring as a team.

== Reception ==
The series has one million copies in circulation as of December 2022.
