= The Wrong Way to Use Healing Magic =

Japanese light novel series and its adaptations

- First light novel volume cover featuring (from left to right) Kasuki, Rose, Usato, Blurin, and Suzune

治癒魔法の間違った使い方 ～戦場を駆ける回復要員～ (Chiyu Mahō no Machigatta Tsukai-kata: Senjō o Kakeru Kaifuku Yōin)
- Genre: Isekai
- Novel series
- Written by: Kurokata
- Published by: Shōsetsuka ni Narō
- Original run: March 2014 – present
- Light novel
- Written by: Kurokata
- Illustrated by: KeG
- Published by: Media Factory
- English publisher: NA: One Peace Books
- Imprint: MF Books
- Original run: March 25, 2016 – March 25, 2020
- Volumes: 12
- Manga
- Written by: Kurokata
- Illustrated by: Reki Kugayama
- Published by: Kadokawa Shoten
- English publisher: NA: One Peace Books
- Magazine: Comp Ace
- Original run: April 26, 2017 – present
- Volumes: 19
- Light novel

The Wrong Way to Use Healing Magic Returns
- Written by: Kurokata
- Illustrated by: KeG
- Published by: Media Factory
- Imprint: MF Books
- Original run: December 25, 2023 – present
- Volumes: 2
- Manga

Sasoi no Machi Rest Valley
- Written by: Kurokata
- Illustrated by: Kaku Kikai
- Published by: Frontier Works
- Magazine: FW Comics Alter
- Original run: August 15, 2023 – present
- Volumes: 3
- Anime television series
- Directed by: Takahide Ogata
- Written by: Shogo Yasukawa
- Music by: Elements Garden
- Studio: Studio Add; Shin-Ei Animation
- Licensed by: Crunchyroll (streaming); SA/SEA: Muse Communication
- Original network: Tokyo MX, BS11, AT-X
- Original run: January 6, 2024 – present
- Episodes: 13
- icon

The Wrong Way to Use Healing Magic (治癒魔法の間違った使い方 ～戦場を駆ける回復要員～, Chiyu Mahō no Machigatta Tsukai-kata: Senjō o Kakeru Kaifuku Yōin; lit. "How to Use Healing Magic Wrongly: Main Recovery Team Member Running Through the Battlefield") is a Japanese light novel series written by Kurokata and illustrated by KeG. It began serialization online in March 2014 on the user-generated novel publishing website Shōsetsuka ni Narō. It was later acquired by Media Factory, who published twelve volumes between March 2016 and March 2020 under their MF Books imprint. A manga adaptation with art by Reki Kugayama has been serialized in Kadokawa Shoten's seinen manga magazine Comp Ace since April 2017. It has been collected in nineteen tankōbon volumes. Both the light novel and manga are licensed in North America by One Peace Books. A sequel light novel series, The Wrong Way to Use Healing Magic Returns, began publication in December 2023. An anime television series adaptation produced by Studio Add and Shin-Ei Animation aired from January to March 2024. A second season has been announced.

== Plot ==
Ken Usato is an ordinary high school student, while his classmates Suzune Inukami and Kazuki Ryusen are the president and vice president of their school's student council, respectively. On a rainy evening, they are walking home from school when a magic circle transports them to the Llinger Kingdom in another world. Its king, King Lloyd, informs them that they have been summoned as heroes to defend the Kingdom from the Demon Lord and his army, which was repelled after attacking the Kingdom two years ago and is preparing for another invasion, and that there is currently no way to return them to their world. They also learn that only Inukami and Kazuki were meant to be summoned, and that Usato was summoned by accident. When they are tested to determine what magical powers they possess, Usato discovers that he is able to use healing magic, which is rare, but considered to be weak and almost useless compared to other forms of magic. Upon learning this, Rose, the captain of the Kingdom's Rescue Team, enlists him into her team and begins training him to be a healer on the front lines of battle, while Inukami and Kazuki are trained as warriors. During and even after the battle, Usato is determined to save as many people as possible and prove that healing magic is not to be underestimated or looked down upon.

== Characters ==
Ken Usato (兎里 健, Usato Ken)/Usato (ウサト)
Voiced by: Shogo Sakata (Japanese); Alejandro Saab (English)
An ordinary high school student who is accidentally transported to another world. He has black hair, which can appear dark-violet in certain lights, and violet-colored eyes, and proves to have an affinity for healing magic, one of the rarest affinities. As such, Rose recruits him, into the Kingdom's Rescue Team. He is initially shy, but over time, he becomes more selfless, and stronger both physically and mentally, becoming a worthy member of the Rescue Team determined to save others. On Earth, like other boys at school, he had a crush on Inukami and now considers her a close friend; like her, he sees life in this world as a chance to live a fulfilling and purposeful life. He is initially afraid of Rose, but he comes to respect and admire her. During his travels on King Lloyd's ambassadorial mission, he develops new ways of using healing magic "the wrong way" and makes new friends and allies among both humans, demi-humans and non-humans.
Suzune Inukami (犬上 鈴音, Inukami Suzune)/Suzune (スズネ)
Voiced by: Ayaka Nanase (Japanese); Alexis Tipton (English)
A high school student and president of her school's student council, who is transported to another world. She has brown hair and green eyes, and has an affinity for thunder magic. She maintained an aloof persona and led a restricted life, possibly due to being born into a wealthy family, but now that she is free from that life, she is excited by new experiences. She admits to Usato that, she prefers this world to Earth and does not want to return, seeing it as a chance to be truly free and herself. But after entering into battle with the Demon Lord's army, she understands the reality of warfare and the possibility that she could be killed. As the story progresses, she seems to develop feelings for Usato, and eventually publicly proclaims her feelings in an attempt to refuse a prince's offer of marriage.
Kazuki Ryusen (龍泉 一樹, Ryūsen Kazuki)/Kazuki (カズキ)
Voiced by: Kengo Takanashi (Japanese); Matt Holmes (English)
A high school student and the vice president of his school's student council, who is transported to another world. He has reddish-brown hair and grey-blue eyes, and has an affinity for light magic. While he appeared to be subservient to Inukami at school, he is sensitive, intelligent, caring, and loyal to his friends. He is also trusting, leading Usato to think of him as "pure, sweet and innocent", and to hope that he will never change, he also seems a little dense about personal relationships, as he is seemingly unaware of Princess Celia's feelings for him.
Blurin (ブルリン, Bururin)
Voiced by: Akeno Watanabe (Japanese); Davon Oliver (English)
A Blue Grizzly, a bear-like creature, with blue fur that, Usato adopted as a cub after he was orphaned and gave him his name. Rose permitted him to stay at the Team's residence and he is officially considered the "property" of the Rescue Team. Blurin is affectionate towards Usato and originally, allowed only him to pet him, although he later, allows Aruku, anyone else gets their hand forcefully slapped away, as both Inukami and Ururu learned, during their stay in Luqvist, Amako helps look after him and, by Chapter 32 of the manga, he, allows her to ride on his back in an emergency. He accompanies Usato, when he and the Heroes depart on King Lloyd's ambassadorial mission and, with his intelligence, speed and strength, proves himself to be an exceptionally powerful ally in battle, despite being a cub.
Amako (アマコ)
Voiced by: Saya Aizawa (Japanese); Emi Lo (English)
A 14-year-old fox beastkin who is an Oracle of Time, a person possessing the power of precognition, and believes that Usato has the power to change possible fatal futures. She appeared in the castle town two years ago after leaving the Beastlands in search of a healer to save her mother, as only humans can use healing magic; until she met Usato, she had not found one strong enough or willing to help her. In Llinger, she works as an assistant to an old woman who sells fruit in the town and took her in. As a reward for her prophetic help, King Lloyd agrees to have Usato accompany her back to the Beastlands when he and the Heroes depart on King Lloyd's ambassadorial mission, during which she and Usato develop a close comradeship and trust (she also seems to have picked up from Usato the trick of using a chilling glare to quell others, which he unwittingly picked up from Rose). She is friends with beastkin twins Kyo and Kiriha, who live in Luqvist, having stayed with them for some time while traveling and later staying with them along with Usato while in Luqvist.
Nea
A Vampire-Necromancer hybrid, who used the village where Usato stopped over as her plaything for 3 centuries. She also used to control the dragon in, which the former Hero failed to defeat. After Usato defeated the dragon, she decided to become his familiar and lifted the puppetry magic she cast on them.

=== Llinger Kingdom Rescue Team ===
Rose (ローズ, Rōzu)
Voiced by: Atsuko Tanaka (Episode 1 - 13) (Japanese); Colleen Clinkenbeard (English)
The captain of Llinger Kingdom's Rescue Team, who has a rare affinity for healing magic and is powerful both magically and physically. She has long dark-green hair reaching past her shoulders in front and midway down her back and green-gold eyes. Formerly a Battalion Commander in the Llinger Royal Army, she resigned both her command and her knighthood after her subordinates were killed in a battle with demon monster hunters, blaming herself and her arrogance for their deaths. A wound from a cursed sword in that battle left her with a scar on her right eye, which she refuses to heal and covers with her hair. After learning that Usato also possesses healing magic, she recruits and personally trains him to be a member of her team. Though her training style and regimen are harsh, she has high hopes for Usato, believing him to be the "subordinate who will never die" that she has been searching for (although she'll never actually tell him so), and is determined to make him her "right-hand man" and "the ideal healer". She is occasionally accompanied by Kukuru, a greyish-black "noir rabbit".
Tong (トング, Tongu)
Voiced by: Kentarō Itō (Japanese); David Wald (English)
A member of the Rescue Team who is Usato's roommate and the strongest of Rose's five subordinates.
Mill (ミル, Miru)
Voiced by: Chado Horii (Japanese); Cris George (English)
A member of the Rescue Team.
Alec (アレク, Areku)
Voiced by: Tōru Nara (Japanese); Marcus D. Stimac (English)
A member of the Rescue Team, who is in charge of kitchen and cooking.
Gomul (ゴムル, Gomuru)
Voiced by: Sōshirō Hori (Japanese); Anthony Bowling (English)
A member of the Rescue Team.
Gurd (グルド, Gurudo)
Voiced by: Hayato Fujii (Japanese); Rudy Lopez (English)
A member of the Rescue Team, who has rat-like features/ears.
Orga Fleur (オルガ・フルール, Oruga Furūru)
Voiced by: Genta Nakamura (Japanese); Landon McDonald (English)
A member of the Rescue Team who is part of the Team's "rear support". Twenty-three years old, he runs a clinic in the town with his younger sister Ururu after they were unable to keep up with Rose's training. While he is able to heal others, he admits that he is not strong enough to heal himself; however, Usato sees that Orga's healing magic is stronger than his.
Ururu Fleur (うるるフルール, Ururu Furūru)
Voiced by: Yoshino Aoyama (Japanese); Nia Celeste (English)
A member of the Rescue Team who is part of the Team's "rear support". Eighteen years old, she helps runs a clinic in the town with her older brother Orga after they were unable to keep up with Rose's brutal training, and is very protective of him despite being five years younger.
Felm (フェルム, Ferumu)/Black Knight (黒騎士, Kurokishi)
Voiced by: Aoi Yūki (Japanese); Ciarán Strange (English)
A member of the Demon Lord's army who was originally part of its second legion and later served under Amila's command. Until her true identity was revealed, she was known as the Black Knight because of the magical living black armor she wears, which is self-regenerating and has abilities that can also be used for offense. After Usato defeats and captures her, Rose uses a talisman to seal off her magic and forcibly recruits her into the Rescue Team to become one of the Runners. She secretly admires Usato for his strength and endurance as well as his kindness towards her, and he is the first person that she reveals her true name to (by Volume 5 of the light novels and Volume 8 of the manga, all of the other Rescue Team members know it).

=== Kingdom of Llinger ===
King Lloyd (キング・ロイド, Kingu Roido)
Voiced by: Hiroshi Yanaka (Japanese); Jim Jorgenson (English)
The monarch of Llinger Kingdom, a wise and kind ruler who is never afraid to make hard decisions when it comes to protecting his kingdom and people (even if he himself feels deep regret), such as Summoning Suzune and Kazuki (and by extension Usato) while knowing that there is currently no way of sending them home again. He also never fails to give honor and respect where it is due, especially to Amako whose prescience enabled Usato to save the heroes and by extension to help win the battle against the Demon Army.
Princess Celia (セリア, Seria)
Voiced by: Reina Ueda (Japanese); Sarah Wiedenheft (English)
The daughter of King Lloyd and princess of Llinger Kingdom. She seems to have developed deep feelings for Kazuki (which he originally seems ignorant of, but by the time of leaving to battle the Demon Lord's Army and afterwards seems to reciprocate).
Commander Siglis (シグリス司令官, Shigurisu shirei-kan)
Voiced by: Masaki Terasoma (Japanese); Christopher Wehkamp (English)
The leader of Llinger Kingdom's armed forces and martial arts instructor to Suzune and Kazuki. Brave and chivalrous, he is acknowledged as the mightiest warrior in Llinger, and along with Rose is one of King Lloyd's closest advisors. While quietly acknowledging the success of Rose's training methods, he is nevertheless exasperated by what he sees as its brutality.
Welcie (ウェルシー, Uerushī)
Voiced by: Maria Naganawa (Japanese); Jill Harris (English)
Possibly the chief mage of Llinger Kingdom and magic instructor to Suzune and Kazuki. She originally studied magic at Luqvist under Headmistress Gladys, and it is assumed that she was the one who performed the Summoning ritual that brought Usato, Suzune and Kazuki to Llinger. She accompanies Usato, Suzune and Kazuki to Luqvist on the first stage of the ambassadorial journey.
Aruku (アルク)
Voiced by: Shōhei Komatsu (Japanese); Carson Wright (English)
A knight of Llinger Kingdom. He is usually a guard at the castle gate, but also acts as protector of the Rescue Team's Rear Support during battle. He describes himself as "clumsy" and best suited to be a guard, but his fellow guards assure Usato that he is skilled in both fire magic (which he learned at Luqvist) and swordsmanship. Usato personally selects him to join him and the Heroes on King Lloyd's ambassadorial mission, and he accompanies Usato and Amako when their paths diverge from the others after Luqvist.

=== Luqvist ===
Nack
A healer and student in Luqvist. He was initially from a water element mage family, disowned when his true element which was Healing. He signed the Luqvist Academy to get away from his family. He was bullied due to notions that healers are only coattailing only on their team. Eventu, even his childhood friend Mina bullied him. He was trained by Usato the way Captain Rose trained him, but only in five days to prepare for the duel against Mina. He eventually defeated Mina and decided to join the Rescue Team, which led to Usato giving him a recommendation letter.
Mina
Nack's childhood friend and bully. She excels in flame magic, and uses a shield as a weapon. In the duel, she was defeated by Nack. In the aftermath, she decides to stay in the Academy, allowing Nack to join the Rescue Team.
Kyo and Kiriha
Twin beastmen who studies in Luqvist Academy. Both are friends of Amako, and due to the disdainful treatment of beastmen in the academy, they just isolated themselves. In the aftermath of the duel, they decided to trust the people they're now friends with.
Halpha
A student in Luqvist that can use his magical eye to find and exploit his enemy's weaknesses. He dueled Ken Usato, but lost. Since then, he decided to become a knight in Llinger.

=== Demon Kingdom ===
Nero Arjence (ネロ・アルジェンス, Nero Arujensu)
Voiced by: Yohei Azakami (Japanese); Ian Sinclair (English)
A member of the Demon Lord's army, Commander of its first legion and Amila's "Master". Two years before the first Demon Army invasion, he led a Demon force into Llinger territory on a mission to aid in an unspecified way in the Demon Lord's revival. Encountered by Rose and her unit, he personally engaged Rose in combat, eventually using dark magic to force his men to sacrifice their own lives while at the same time wiping out Rose's unit. In his battle with Rose, he used a cursed sword to wound her right eye and almost kill her; however, the self-sacrifice of Rose's second-in-command Aul to save Rose enraged Rose to the point where she nearly killed Nero, an act only stopped by Amila's attempt to save her Master. Although grievously wounded, it is assumed from Amila's words that he has survived.
Amila Vergrett (アミラ・ヴェルグレット, Āmira Veruguretto)
Voiced by: Hitomi Ueda (Japanese); Hayden Daviau (English)
The commander of the third legion of the Demon Lord's army. She and Rose have been mortal enemies since she nearly killed her master Nero Arjence two years ago, an act for which she has vowed vengeance. In Volume Two of the light novels and Chapter 18 of the manga, the Demon Lord demotes her from commander to common soldier after the Demon Army's defeat, believing that she can serve him better in the ranks.
Hyriluk (ヒュルルク, Hyururuku)
Voiced by: Wataru Hatano (Japanese); Kieran Flitton (English)
A researcher in the Demon Lord's army who created two giant serpent monsters. One was killed in the Darkness of Llinger forest by Usato and Rose and the other in battle by Inukami and Kazuki.
Demon Lord (魔王, Maō)
Voiced by: Shin-ichiro Miki (Japanese); Gabe Kunda (English)
The ruler and leader of the Demons. He is centuries old, and was defeated and sealed away hundreds of years ago by the first Summoned Hero. He is highly intelligent (only a few of his personal servants can provide, in his opinion, a decent conversation) and calm to the point that he does not seem to be angered by the failures of his subordinates.

== Media ==
=== Light novels ===
The series written by Kurokata began serialization online in March 2014 on the user-generated novel publishing website Shōsetsuka ni Narō. It was later acquired by Media Factory, who have published twelve volumes with illustrations by KeG between March 25, 2016, and March 25, 2020, under their MF Books imprint. The light novel is licensed in North America by One Peace Books.

No.	Original release date	Original ISBN	English release date	English ISBN
1	March 25, 2016	978-4-04-068185-6	August 23, 2022	978-1-64273-200-9
2	June 24, 2016	978-4-04-068427-7	May 15, 2023	978-1-64273-232-0
3	September 23, 2016	978-4-04-068636-3	August 22, 2023	978-1-64273-286-3
4	January 25, 2017	978-4-04-069054-4	May 7, 2024	978-1-64273-332-7
5	April 25, 2017	978-4-04-069191-6	January 14, 2025	978-1-64273-386-0
6	September 25, 2017	978-4-04-069498-6	October 27, 2026	978-1-64273-575-8
7	February 24, 2018	978-4-04-069727-7	April 20, 2027	978-1-64273-623-6
8	July 25, 2018	978-4-04-065023-4	August 3, 2027	978-1-64273-650-2
9	November 24, 2018	978-4-04-065306-8	—	—
10	April 25, 2019	978-4-04-065682-3	—	—
11	October 25, 2019	978-4-04-064060-0	—	—
12	March 25, 2020	978-4-04-064538-4	—	—

A sequel light novel series by the same author and illustrator, titled The Wrong Way to Use Healing Magic Returns, began publication on December 25, 2023.

No.	Japanese release date	Japanese ISBN
1	December 25, 2023	978-4-04-683145-3
2	March 25, 2024	978-4-04-683481-2

=== Manga ===
A manga adaptation with art by Reki Kugayama began serialization on Kadokawa Shoten's Comp Ace magazine on April 26, 2017. It has been collected in nineteen tankōbon volumes as of October 23, 2026. The manga adaptation is also licensed in North America by One Peace Books.

No.	Original release date	Original ISBN	English release date	English ISBN
1	September 26, 2017	978-4-04-106129-9	November 22, 2022	978-1-64273-199-6
2	February 26, 2018	978-4-04-106728-4	February 21, 2023	978-1-64273-230-6
3	September 22, 2018	978-4-04-107356-8	June 27, 2023	978-1-64273-231-3
4	March 4, 2019	978-4-04-107897-6	December 5, 2023	978-1-64273-287-0
5	August 26, 2019	978-4-04-108579-0	January 9, 2024	978-1-64273-288-7
6	March 24, 2020	978-4-04-108580-6	May 14, 2024	978-1-64273-330-3
7	October 26, 2020	978-4-04-110503-0	June 11, 2024	978-1-64273-331-0
8	April 24, 2021	978-4-04-110504-7	December 17, 2024	978-1-64273-385-3
9	November 26, 2021	978-4-04-111801-6	July 29, 2025	978-1-64273-441-6
10	March 26, 2022	978-4-04-111802-3	April 14, 2026	978-1-64273-547-5
11	October 25, 2022	978-4-04-113043-8	January 19, 2027	978-1-64273-627-4
12	March 25, 2023	978-4-04-113044-5	July 13, 2027	978-1-64273-649-6
13	October 26, 2023	978-4-04-114234-9	—	—
14	March 26, 2024	978-4-04-114235-6	—	—
15	October 25, 2024	978-4-04-115519-6	—	—
16	March 25, 2025	978-4-04-115858-6	—	—
17	October 23, 2025	978-4-04-116740-3	—	—
18	March 26, 2026	978-4-04-117090--8	—	—
19	October 23, 2026	978-4-04-117784-6	—	—

==== Spin-off ====
A spin-off manga illustrated by Kaku Kikai began serialization on the Piccoma website under Frontier Works' FW Comics Alter brand on August 15, 2023. Three tankōbon volumes have been published as of August 18, 2025.

No.	Japanese release date	Japanese ISBN
1	February 17, 2024	978-4-86657-735-7
2	October 18, 2024	978-4-86657-810-1
3	August 18, 2025	978-4-86657-871-2

=== Anime ===
An anime adaptation was announced during the MF Books 8th Anniversary livestream event on August 15, 2021. It was later announced that it would be produced by Studio Add and Shin-Ei Animation and directed by Takahide Ogata, with Shogo Yasukawa in charge of series composition, Keiji Tanabe as character designer, and Elements Garden as music composer. The series aired from January 6 to March 30, 2024, on Tokyo MX and BS11. (Note: Tokyo MX and BS11 the series premiere on January 5 at 24:30, which is effectively January 6 at 12:30 a.m. JST.) The opening theme song is "Cure", performed by Waterweed, while the ending theme is "Green Jade", performed by ChouCho. Crunchyroll streamed the series, with Muse Communication licensing it in South and Southeast Asia.

A second season was announced at Otakon on August 3, 2024.

==== Episodes ====
No.	Title (Note: All English titles are taken from Crunchyroll.)	Directed by	Written by	Storyboarded by	Original release date
1	"Dragged Into Another World!"; Transliteration: "Makikomarete Isekai!" (Japanese: 巻き込まれて異世界！)	Takahide Ogata	Shogo Yasukawa	Takahide Ogata	January 6, 2024
Ken Usato, along with his two new-found friends from their school's student council, Suzune Inukami and Kazuki Ryuusen, are transported to another world via a summoning circle. While Usato and Kazuki are stunned, Inukami is thoroughly excited. The Kingdom of Llinger summoned them using forbidden magic to serve as heroes. A demon lord has been attacking Llinger for several years and the trio of high school students is their solution. While the Demon Lord's forces and power grow, the kingdom's diminish. With no way to return to their own world, they reluctantly agree to comply. However, while it seems Usato was summoned accidentally, he possesses extremely rare healing magic. The Llinger officials seem terrified about Usato's affinity and it's soon revealed why: Rose, who is a healer herself and will no doubt want him on her team if she finds out about his magic, is eccentric and a brutal trainer. Rose abducts Usato in order to train him to become a full-fledged healer and introduces him to her equally eccentric team.
2	"The Training from Hell Begins!"; Transliteration: "Jigoku no Hajimari!" (Japanese: 地獄の始まり！)	Takahide Ogata	Shogo Yasukawa	Takahide Ogata	January 13, 2024
The day after being summoned, Usato is visited by Inukami and Kazuki then begins his "training from hell", which is all physical and not magical. Usato's training is easier than he imagines at first, but gets progressively more difficult. Rose proves every bit the brutal teacher he expected, but his magic begins to manifest after a few days. After nearly two weeks, Rose finally tells him why he's training his body and not his magic: he needs to be able to outrun the enemy and rescue injured allies quickly. His training only gets more difficult. Inukami and Kazuki visit again (along with Princess Celia) and notice the fruits of his efforts. Rose drops the bomb that she's training him to become her right hand man. Realizing how brutal Usato's training is compared to theirs, Inukami and Kazuki gloss over their training, then leave content after seeing Usato has acclimated well to his new environment and can be himself. Rose takes Usato outside the city to the Darkness of Llinger (a forest), telling him not to come back until he's killed a grand grizzly, the rare and evolved form of a blue grizzly, then physically throws him off a cliff into the forest.
3	"Brutal! The Darkness of Llinger!"; Transliteration: "Kakoku! Llinger no Yami!" (Japanese: 過酷！リングルの闇！)	Takahide Ogata	Shogo Yasukawa	Takahide Ogata	January 20, 2024
After a crash landing, Usato immediately encounters a Grand Grizzly and two Blue Grizzlies (papa, mama and cub) that chase him down. He escapes into a river and begins the hunt in earnest the next day. He uses his magic to heal an injured rabbit monster that ends up following him around. It can seemingly understand what he's saying and leads him to the grand grizzly's den--where the same bears that chased him before make their home. Usato waits to attack, encountering a massive white serpent in the meantime. When he finally works up the will to kill the grizzly, he finds the two adults killed, likely from the serpent from a few days prior. Unwilling to overlook that the serpent killed not for food but out of malice and out of sympathy for the now-orphaned cub, he leaves to avenge its family. Some time later, the rabbit leads him to the serpent, where he finds the cub trying to battle it. Although wounded and poisoned by the snake's venom, Usato nearly defeats it and is rescued by Rose in the end when she crushes its skull under her boots. He also learns the rabbit is her pet and has been watching over him. Usato has passed her test and the cub becomes Usato's new companion.
4	"Rescue Team Member Usato!"; Transliteration: "Kyūmeidan-in Usato!" (Japanese: 救命団員ウサト！)	Takahide Ogata	Shogo Yasukawa	Takahide Ogata	January 27, 2024
The time for battle with the Demon Lord's army draws very near, and Rose informs Usato he'll be on the front lines with her healing the wounded. The blue grizzly cub, whom Usato has named Blurin, joins in on Usato's training; his role is to be carried on Usato's back to simulate wounded soldiers while he continues his running routine. While running through town carrying Blurin, Usato also learns more about the Rescue Team's somewhat infamous reputation and meets Orga Fleur, one of the Team's healers, who helps Usato understand the significance of having a healer on the front lines. Usato makes his way to the castle to visit Inukami and Kazuki, but Kazuki is on a training excursion in the Darkness of Llinger. After a pleasant chat with Inukami (and a failed attempt on her part to pet Blurin), Usato finds his resolve and shares a moment with Rose.
5	"Usato, Back in the Forest!"; Transliteration: "Usato, Futatabi Mori e!" (Japanese: ウサト、再び森へ！)	Masayuki Egami	Shogo Yasukawa	Takahide Ogata	February 3, 2024
Per the King's request, Usato joins Inukami (along with knight Aruku and a mage) on her training mission in the forest and brings Blurin along (the cub dislikees everyone but him, so he can't be left with the Rescue Team). On the outskirts of the forest, bandits attack the group. The battle is interrupted by stampeding boar monsters, and Usato and Inukami get separated from the others, the force of the attack sending them flying into the river and over a waterfall. Finding themselves in the same area Usato had crash-landed in previously, they make camp in a cave for the night. Kazuki learns they went missing and tries to go after them, but is stopped by Rose who proudly proclaims that if Inukami is with Usato, they'll be fine. That night, Usato and Inukami discuss if they want to go home to Japan or not. They reunite with the others the next day, led by Blurin who had followed Usato's scent.
6	"Impending Danger...!"; Transliteration: "Semarikuru Kiki……!" (Japanese: 迫り来る危機……！)	Hidekazu Oka	Shogo Yasukawa	Takaaki Ishiyama	February 10, 2024
After the King apologizes for allowing Usato and Inukami to get lost, Kazuki reprimands Usato for his blase attitude about going missing, then gets some reassurance from Celia. Back in the King's throne room, Rose and Siglis are informed that the bandits that attacked the party in the forest were from the Grasslands, where creatures (like the boars) are fleeing their natural habitats, indicating the demon army's imminent return. Rose is ordered to do some reconnaissance and find their exact location; the king also requests that Rose rejoin the armed forces and lead Llinger's army as she did in the past--which she declines, revealing more of her past. In addition, she makes mention of wanting and searching for a "subordinate who will never die," naming Usato as this subordinate. Rose finds the demons building a bridge into human territory and destroys it by hurling a tree into it. Delivering a letter from Rose to Orga at the town's clinic, Usato meets Orga's younger sister Ururu, who is also a healer and tells Usato about her and Orga's experiences with Rose; later, Usato gets some hands-on training by healing some injured civilians. Amako, a fox beastkin, stops Usato in the street and shows him a vision of the future where Inukami and Kazuki are killed in battle.
7	"A Night of Decisions!"; Transliteration: "Ketsui no Yoru!" (Japanese: 決意の夜！)	Shuji Saito	Shogo Yasukawa	Takahide Ogata	February 17, 2024
Usato tries to find the fox girl to ask about the vision, without success. When Rose returns to the city from her patrol, Usato learns from her that the Demon Lord's army is coming, then she reports to the King. Inukami and Kazuki are briefed and told to prepare. That night, Kazuki visits Usato, admitting that he's terrified of war, and Usato comforts him. Kazuki finds his own resolve after talking it out with Usato, and Inukami overhears the entire conversation after having followed Kazuki to check on him. The next day, the King informs his army and the people about the impending invasion. Kazuki visits Celia and vows to come back. As the Rescue Team prepares for departure, Blurin reaffirms that he only likes Usato when he refuses to let Ururu pet him, and the rest of the Rescue Team readies for war. Rose explains to Usato how she and he will operate on the field, and he receives an official Rescue Team uniform. Rose ends her briefing by drill into Usato that the worst thing one can do on the battlefield is forget the value of their own life.
8	"Battalion Commander Rose"; Transliteration: "Daitaichō Rōzu" (Japanese: ⼤隊⻑ローズ)	Ayaka Tsujihashi	Shogo Yasukawa	Takahide Ogata	February 24, 2024
As Llinger's forces make their way to the battlefield, Rose flashes back to two years ago when she was still a knight. Her first team is introduced, and their fateful mission is recounted, starting slow and uneventful as a scouting of demon activity in the Darkness of Llinger. Rose and her deputy commander, Aul, have a heart-to-heart, and Usato's similarities to Aul are revealed. The next day, the team continues their recon mission and encounters demons hunting monsters in human territory as part of some hidden scheme. Rose tries to get them to leave peacefully, but the situation devolves when the demons attack. Rose goes after the leader, Nero Arjence, shocking him with her strength, speed, and healing magic.
9	"The End and the Beginning"; Transliteration: "Owari to Hajimari" (Japanese: 終わりと始まり)	Takeshi Nezu	Shogo Yasukawa	Takahide Ogata	March 2, 2024
As the flashback continues, Rose's team battle the demons whilst Rose continues her battle with Nero. Nero unleashes a cursed blade and some kind of dark magic that turns the tide of the battle, making the other demons stronger, immune to their own pain, and willing to sacrifice their own lives without hesitation. One of Rose's squad is killed, shocking and discouraging the others, causing the rest to be killed as well in short order. Rose loses her composure and, as a consequence, suffers a wound to her right eye, which can't be healed because the damage was inflicted by a cursed item. Just as Nero strikes a killing blow at Rose, Aul jumps in front of her and takes it herself. Using her grief and rage, Rose overpowers Nero. Before she can kill him, a younger Amila rescues him. Rose is emotionally unable to give chase and, unable to heal Aul, can only hold her in her arms as the girl dies. Later, Rose debriefs the King and requests to be demoted, mourning her team and blaming herself. After about a month, Rose recovers enough to decide to create the Rescue Team. Back in the present, she commends Usato for his accomplishments (although his semi-snarky replies earn him "correction").
10	"Unhinged!? The Black Knight Appears!"; Transliteration: "Saikyō!? Kurokishi Arawaru!" (Japanese: 最狂!? 黒騎⼠現る！)	Masayuki Egami	Shogo Yasukawa	Takahide Ogata	March 9, 2024
At the base camp, Usato wakes early and runs into Inukami, who seems far too excited for a battlefield. Kazuki rescues him from her fangirl moment and takes her to meet with Siglis. Sometime later, the battle begins; Usato, Rose, Orga and Ururu remain at the camp to tend the wounded while the other Team members bring them back from the front. Another giant white serpent appears on the battlefield, as does the Black Knight, who can't be harmed due to their unique Reflection magic. After Rose and Usato finally go into battle, she gives Usato one last piece of advice before they separate to cover more ground and begin healing the wounded. Inukami and Kazuki run into the Black Knight, and the vision of the two dying at the Black Knight's hands suddenly replays in Usato's mind, causing him immense pain. The two heroes make a valiant effort, but fall prey to the Black Knight's Reflection magic.
11	"Wham! Ultimate Healing Punch!"; Transliteration: "Sakuretsu! Hishō no Kobushi!" (Japanese: 炸裂！ 必⽣の拳！)	Takahide Ogata	Shogo Yasukawa	Takahide Ogata	March 16, 2024
The episode begins with a flashback to Japan from Inukami's perspective, where she remembers meeting Usato for the first time and getting to know him in their new world. On the battlefield, Usato arrives just in time to save her and Kazuki, landing a punch on the Black Knight and damaging their armor. The Black Knight, who is revealed to be a female, is furious at being hit and actually injured. She chases Usato as he tries to get his friends to safety, and Usato eventually takes her on himself so he can get to the other wounded soldiers. The Reflection magic appears useless against Usato's healing magic, giving him the upper hand. After a quick but fierce battle, the Black Knight's armor is destroyed by his Ultimate Healing Punch, knocking her unconscious. He then tends to the wounded and the demon army breaks, preventing more injuries. Meanwhile, the white serpent is still wreaking havoc, and the healed Inukami and Kazuki take on the serpent and kill it. After Amila learns of the Black Knight's defeat, she orders the demons to retreat. Rose and Usato head back to camp, and Rose commends Usato for saving the heroes, defeating the Black Knight and especially for coming back to her alive before he collapses from over-exertion.
12	"The True Face of the Black Knight!"; Transliteration: "Kurokishi no Sugao!" (Japanese: ⿊騎⼠の素顔！)	Takahide Ogata	Shogo Yasukawa	Takahide Ogata	March 23, 2024
After returning from battle and being officially commended, Usato is summoned back to the castle (getting mobbed in town by grateful citizens on his way there). At the castle, the King requests that he speak to the Black Knight, who refuses to divulge information unless she can meet with Usato. Inukami tags along with him and Siglis as they make their way to the Knight's cell; after learning from Siglis that dark magic and healing magic basically cancel each other out, Usato realizes that none of the damage he inflicted on the Black Knight healed and she's likely in critical condition. He heals her properly, causing her to weep from his magic's warmth. Later, Rose begins training Usato in dodging attacks, since healing injuries caused by cursed weapons is impossible, meaning that he needs to practice how to properly avoid being hit. He complains about his harsh training to the Black Knight, whom he has been visiting regularly. Rose meets with the King and, under his orders, offers the Black Knight a choice: rot in a cell or be trained by her as part of the Rescue Team--not really much of a choice, since Rose takes her by force anyway after sealing her Dark magic away. Rose informs Usato that he, Inukami and Kazuki will soon be tasked by the King with delivering official missives to neighboring territories asking for aid against the Demon Lord. Later, while in town with Inukami, Usato spots and catches up with Amako, who tells him her mother needs his help.
13	"The Journey Begins!"; Transliteration: "Tabidachi!" (Japanese: 旅⽴ち！)	Takahide Ogata	Shogo Yasukawa	Takahide Ogata	March 30, 2024
Usato and Inukami talk to Amako at Rescue Team HQ. Amako reveals that she left Beastkin Territory two years ago to find a healer, as humans are the only ones capable of wielding healing magic, and it can only be Usato since he is a healer and a fighter. Usato decides to use the diplomatic mission as an excuse to go to Beastkin Territory and save Amako's mother. Apparently, Beastkin value their Oracles of Time (in this case, Amako), so escorting her back to her people is good diplomatically. Later, Usato learns the Black Knight's name is Felm, gifting her a diary to write in while she's training, and she spies on his personal training with Rose (he's progressing, albeit slowly, and she is horrified by the nature of the training). Later, the King thanks Amako for giving Usato the vision and thereby saving the kingdom, giving Usato his blessing to help her, and that he'll be delivering the King's missive to four territories on the way to Beastkin Territory. Usato requests Aruku to be one of his special escorts and Blurin another. Elsewhere, Rose catches up to Felm, who, after learning about Usato's mission, had run away intending to tag along with him secretly. Rose gives Usato some final advice and tells him she believes in him. Everyone sets off on their journeys to see new nations and people.

== See also ==
- Mercedes and the Waning Moon, another light novel series with the same illustrator
- Skeleton Knight in Another World, another light novel series with the same illustrator
- Tensei Shita Kūkan Mahōtsukai wa Shōtai Kakushite Medachitai!, another light novel series with the same illustrator
