= Tensei Shita Kūkan Mahōtsukai wa Shōtai Kakushite Medachitai! =

Japanese light novel series

- First light novel volume cover

転生した空間魔法使いは正体隠して目立ちたい！
- Genre: Fantasy comedy; Isekai
- Light novel
- Written by: Taketori Okina
- Illustrated by: KeG
- Published by: Media Factory
- Imprint: MF Books
- Original run: February 25, 2025 – present
- Volumes: 3
- Manga
- Written by: Taketori Okina
- Illustrated by: Rurihara Zurachy
- Published by: ASCII Media Works
- Imprint: Dengeki Comics NEXT
- Magazine: Dengeki Daioh
- Original run: March 27, 2025 – present
- Volumes: 3

Tensei Shita Kūkan Mahōtsukai wa Shōtai Kakushite Medachitai! (転生した空間魔法使いは正体隠して目立ちたい！) is a Japanese light novel series written by Taketori Okina and illustrated by KeG. It began publication by Media Factory under their MF Books imprint in February 2025. A manga adaptation illustrated by Rurihara Zurachy began serialization in ASCII Media Works' Dengeki Daioh magazine in March 2025.

== Media ==
=== Light novel ===
Written by Taketori Okina and illustrated by KeG, Tensei Shita Kūkan Mahōtsukai wa Shōtai Kakushite Medachitai! began publication by Media Factory under their MF Books imprint on February 27, 2025; three volumes have been released as of September 2026.

No.	Japanese release date	Japanese ISBN
1	February 25, 2025	978-4-04-684139-1
2	June 25, 2025	978-4-04-684895-6
3	September 25, 2026 (ebook)	—

=== Manga ===
A manga adaptation illustrated by Rurihara Zurachy began serialization in ASCII Media Works' Dengeki Daioh magazine on March 27, 2025. It has been compiled into three volumes as of September 2026.

No.	Japanese release date	Japanese ISBN
1	August 27, 2025	978-4-04-916557-9
2	March 27, 2026	978-4-04-952167-2
3	September 26, 2026	978-4-04-952454-3

== See also ==
- Mercedes and the Waning Moon, another light novel series with the same illustrator
- Skeleton Knight in Another World, another light novel series with the same illustrator
- The Wrong Way to Use Healing Magic, another light novel series with the same illustrator
