= Mercedes and the Waning Moon =

Japanese light novel series

- Mercedes and the Waning Moon: The Dungeoneering Feats of a Discarded Vampire Aristocrat
- First light novel volume cover

欠けた月のメルセデス～吸血鬼の貴族に転生したけど捨てられそうなのでダンジョンを制覇する～ (Kaketa Tsuki no Merusedesu: Kyūketsuki no Kizoku ni Tensei Shitakedo Suterare Sōnanode Danjon o Seiha Suru)
- Genre: Isekai
- Novel series
- Written by: Firehead
- Published by: Shōsetsuka ni Narō
- Original run: October 1, 2018 – November 6, 2022
- Light novel
- Written by: Firehead
- Illustrated by: KeG
- Published by: TO Books
- English publisher: NA: J-Novel Club
- Imprint: TO Bunko
- Original run: May 10, 2021 – present
- Volumes: 5
- Manga
- Written by: Firehead
- Illustrated by: Pochi Edoya
- Published by: TO Books
- English publisher: NA: J-Novel Club
- Imprint: Corona Comics
- Magazine: Comic Corona
- Original run: August 23, 2021 – present
- Volumes: 6
- Anime television series
- Directed by: Kunihisa Sugishima
- Written by: Jun Kumagai
- Music by: R.O.N; Shūhei Mutsuki
- Studio: Teddy
- Original network: JNN (TBS)
- Original run: January 10, 2027 – scheduled
- icon

Mercedes and the Waning Moon: The Dungeoneering Feats of a Discarded Vampire Aristocrat (Note: Japanese: 欠けた月のメルセデス～吸血鬼の貴族に転生したけど捨てられそうなのでダンジョンを制覇する～, Hepburn: Kaketa Tsuki no Merusedesu: Kyūketsuki no Kizoku ni Tensei Shitakedo Suterare Sōnanode Danjon o Seiha Suru) is a Japanese light novel series written by Firehead and illustrated by KeG. The series was originally serialized on the online service Shōsetsuka ni Narō from October 2018 to November 2022, before TO Books acquired it for publication beginning in May 2021. Five volumes have been released as of July 2026. A manga adaptation illustrated by Pochi Edoya began serialization on TO Books's Comic Corona website in August 2021, and has been compiled into six tankōbon volumes as of July 2026. An anime television series adaptation produced by Teddy is set to premiere in January 2027.

== Plot ==
The series follows Mercedes Grunewald, a vampire woman and the reincarnation of a Japanese person who died in a past life with regrets. She lives in the countryside with her mother, who was forced away by her father after a falling out. Although of noble descendent, she is left out of his line of succession due to being born to a concubine. With an unclear future, she decides to become a dungeon crawler to gain strength and wealth.

== Characters ==
Mercedes Grunewald (メルセデス・グリューネヴァルト, Merusedesu Guryūnevaruto)
Voiced by: Anna Nagase
Benkei (弁慶)
Voiced by: Kenta Miyake
Kuro (黒)
Voiced by: Ryūnosuke Watanuki
Florian (フロリアン, Furorian)
Voiced by: Junichi Suwabe
Ryudia (リュディア)
Voiced by: Ai Kayano
Margitte (マルギット, Marugitto)
Voiced by: Nichika Ōmori
Monica (モニカ, Monika)
Voiced by: Miyu Tomita
Bernhard (ベルンハルト, Berunharuto)
Voiced by: Show Hayami

== Media ==
=== Light novel ===
The series is written by Firehead, who originally posted it as a web novel on the online service Shōsetsuka ni Narō from October 1, 2018, to November 6, 2022. It was later acquired for publication by TO Books, which began publishing it as a light novel on May 10, 2021. Five volumes have released as of July 2026. The series is licensed in English by J-Novel Club.

No.	Original release date	Original ISBN	North American release date	North American ISBN
1	May 10, 2021	978-4-86699-216-7	February 12, 2025	978-1-7183-0816-9
2	November 20, 2021	978-4-86699-372-0	June 16, 2025	978-1-7183-0818-3
3	February 19, 2022	978-4-86699-457-4	September 22, 2025	978-1-7183-0820-6
4	August 15, 2025	978-4-86794-669-5	February 13, 2026	978-1-7183-0824-4
5	July 15, 2026	978-4-86854-071-7	—	—

=== Manga ===
A manga adaptation illustrated by Pochi Edoya began serialization on TO Books's Comic Corona website on August 23, 2021. The first tankōbon volume was released on December 15, 2021; six volumes have been released as of July 2026. The manga adaptation is also licensed in English by J-Novel Club.

No.	Original release date	Original ISBN	North American release date	North American ISBN
1	December 15, 2021	978-4-86699-391-1	January 29, 2025	978-1-7183-2658-3
2	October 15, 2022	978-4-86699-696-7	April 16, 2025	978-1-7183-2659-0
3	August 15, 2023	978-4-86699-921-0	June 11, 2025	978-1-7183-2660-6
4	September 2, 2024	978-4-86794-295-6	November 12, 2025	978-1-7183-2661-3
5	August 15, 2025	978-4-86794-658-9	August 5, 2026	978-1-7183-2662-0
6	July 15, 2026	978-4-86854-040-3	—	—

=== Anime ===
An anime adaptation was announced on August 7, 2025. It was later revealed to be a television series that will be produced by Teddy and directed by Kunihisa Sugishima, with series composition handled by Jun Kumagai, characters designed by Nami Shōyama, and music composed by R.O.N and Shūhei Mutsuki. The series is set to premiere on January 10, 2027, on TBS and its affiliates.

== Reception ==
By July 2026, the series had over 200,000 copies in circulation.

== See also ==
- Skeleton Knight in Another World, another light novel series with the same illustrator
- Tensei Shita Kūkan Mahōtsukai wa Shōtai Kakushite Medachitai!, another light novel series with the same illustrator
- A Wild Last Boss Appeared!, another light novel series with the same writer
- The Wrong Way to Use Healing Magic, another light novel series with the same illustrator
