= Skeleton Knight in Another World =

Japanese light novel series and its adaptations

- First light novel volume cover, featuring Ariane (front), Arc (back), and Ponta (top left)

骸骨騎士様、只今異世界へお出掛け中 (Gaikotsu Kishi-sama, Tadaima Isekai e Odekake-chū)
- Genre: Fantasy; Isekai
- Novel series
- Written by: Ennki Hakari
- Published by: Shōsetsuka ni Narō
- Original run: October 19, 2014 – July 16, 2018
- Light novel
- Written by: Ennki Hakari
- Illustrated by: KeG
- Published by: Overlap
- English publisher: NA: Seven Seas Entertainment
- Imprint: Overlap Novels
- Original run: June 25, 2015 – present
- Volumes: 10
- Manga
- Written by: Ennki Hakari
- Illustrated by: Akira Sawano
- Published by: Overlap
- English publisher: NA: Seven Seas Entertainment
- Magazine: Comic Gardo
- Original run: February 10, 2017 – present
- Volumes: 16
- Anime television series
- Directed by: Katsumi Ono
- Written by: Takeshi Kikuchi (S1); Toshizo Nemoto (S2)
- Music by: eba; Tsubasa Ito
- Studio: Studio Kai (S1); Hornets (S1); Aura Studio (S2)
- Licensed by: Crunchyroll (streaming); SA/SEA: Muse Communication
- Original network: AT-X, Tokyo MX, BS11 (S1-2); SUN (S1)
- Original run: April 7, 2022 – September 21, 2026
- Episodes: 24

Skeleton Knight in Another World (Japanese: 骸骨騎士様、只今異世界へお出掛け中, Hepburn: Gaikotsu Kishi-sama, Tadaima Isekai e Odekake-chū) is a Japanese light novel series written by Ennki Hakari and illustrated by KeG. It began serialization online in October 2014 on the novel self-publishing website Shōsetsuka ni Narō. The series was later acquired and published by Overlap under their Overlap Novels imprint in June 2015.

A manga adaptation with art by Akira Sawano is serialized online via Overlap's Comic Gardo website since February 2017. Both the light novel and manga are licensed in North America by Seven Seas Entertainment. An anime television series adaptation produced by Studio Kai and Hornets aired from April to June 2022. A second season produced by Aura Studio aired from July to September 2026.

== Plot ==
Upon awakening, a gamer finds himself in the body of the avatar he was using in an online game: a powerful knight named Arc whose appearance underneath his armor is that of a skeleton. In unfamiliar territory, he decides that it would be best to hide his appearance by never removing his helmet. After he spots a group of bandits attempting to rape two women, Arc kills the bandits and escorts the women to a town, where he becomes a mercenary.

On his journey, he discovers a wounded cotton-tailed fox with green fur. After he heals it with magic, the fox indicates that it wants to travel with him and he names it Ponta. As "spirit creatures" like Ponta rarely bond with humans, Ponta's presence signals to others that Arc is trustworthy.

Later, Arc learns of this world's slave trade, where humans have captured and enslaved elves. After Arc intervenes in a battle to help an elf warrior named Ariane Glenys Maple save a group of captured elf children, Ariane hires Arc to help her free enslaved elves who are being held in the city of Diento. While invading the slave warehouse, Arc encounters a catgirl ninja who gives him information about humans involved in the slave trade and about other captured elves being held in the local lord's castle. After Arc and Ariane free the captured elves in the warehouse, they free two female elves in the castle. After they escape the castle, Ariane asks Arc to accompany her back to their lands. Arc is reluctant and shows why by removing his helmet, revealing his skeletal form. While initially shocked, Ariane realizes that, despite his appearance, Arc is not evil but under a curse, and she promises that the elves will keep his secret.

At the elvish settlement of Lalatoya, Arc is welcomed by Ariane's parents, Elder Dillan and his wife. At a meeting of Elders in the elvish capital city, at which the information about human Nobles being involved in the slave trade and the clear violation of the Elf–Human peace treaty is discussed, it is decided that while no direct retaliation against the humans will be made, the secret operations to free enslaved elves will continue. Dillan offers to hire Arc to continue helping Ariane, and as payment provides him with information about a magic pool in Dragon Lord country that may lift his skeleton curse. Arc agrees, and he and Ariane, with Ponta, begin their quest to free the captured elves and end the slave trade. They are joined in their mission by Chiyome, the ninja Arc had previously encountered in Diento, who is engaged on a similar mission to free her fellow beast people who have likewise been enslaved by humans.

Meanwhile, King Karlon of the Rhoden Kingdom, who, thanks to the events in Diento, has learned of the possible involvement of nobility in the elf slave trade, dispatches his daughter Yuriarna on a diplomatic mission to the Grand Duchy of Limbult (which trades with the elves and where his older daughter Seriarna is the ruler's wife) to arrange a meeting with the elves. However, her older brothers Sekt and Dakares both have ambitions to inherit the throne and are vying for power. Yuriarna suspects Dakares of being involved in the slave trade and Sekt of knowing about it but trying to use it for his own advantage ... and that both will stop at nothing to achieve their goals, even if it means eliminating anyone in their way (a fact proven when Sekt has Dakares assassinated and then frames him for the attempted murder of Yuriarna).

As Arc, Ariane and Chiyome's quest progresses and they gain friends and allies while traveling to different kingdoms across the world, they learn that the slave trade is merely the tip of the iceberg and that the Holy East Revlon Kingdom, ruled by the ruthless Emperor Domitianus, and this world's main religion, the Holy Hilk Kingdom, may be behind all the evil they are fighting to overcome.

== Characters ==
Arc (アーク, Āku)
Voiced by: Tomoaki Maeno (Japanese); Brandon Johnson (English)
A man who wakes up in the world of the fantasy video game he has been playing to find himself transformed into his avatar, a heavily armored skeleton named Arc. Since the series begins with him waking up in this world, there is no information as to how he was transported to this world or his real name, appearance, or past in his original world. His armor makes his appearance tall and imposing, and his physical strength is shown to be quite superhuman. He also alters his speaking voice to sound deeper and more masculine, as befits his game character. He has a strong moral sense and is always ready and willing to help or defend endangered or oppressed beings, whether humans, elves or beast people; he also is extremely polite (which, considering his size and supposed status as a "knight" due to his armor, surprises most ordinary people) and never hesitates to admit when a person is his equal (such as the ninja Goemon) or superior in any way (such as Ariane, Glenys and Chiyome). He can get very excited at certain things, but he is quite unflappable in battle. There are people who knew his true identity as an Undead, and they believe his alibi or cover story of finding a cure for his "curse" is the reason he's using Holy magic despite being Undead.
Ariane Glenys Maple (アリアン・グレニス・メープル, Arian Gurenisu Mēpuru) / Ariane Glenys Lalatoya (アリアン・グレニス・ララトイア, Arian Gurenisu Raratoia)
Voiced by: Fairouz Ai (Japanese); Caitlin Glass (English)
The second daughter of Elder Dillan Tahg Lalatoya and Glenys Alna Lalatoya, she is a female elf warrior of the elf capital city of Maple (elf names use the name of their registered village/city as a surname, hence her surname of "Maple"; however, in Volume 6 of the light novel series Glenys tells Arc that Ariane has changed her home registration from "Maple" to "Lalatoya"). In the light novel series, she is described as having amethyst-colored skin, golden-irised eyes and white hair (in the light novels, these are the unmistakable signs of a "dark elf"), while she has pale skin and pink hair in the anime. While the circumstances of her first meeting with Arc differ between the light novel and anime, both versions have her hiring Arc to assist her after he aids her in battling slavers who had captured elf children. While she is a skilled fighter, she feels inferior to her older sister Eevin, who is also a warrior. She has a deep distrust of humans because of the crimes committed against her people; however, through her association with Arc she may be modifying her outlook (although she remains cautious and defensive). She has a physical intolerance for alcohol (two glasses of strong liquor are enough to make her drunk), and in the anime she sometimes forgets that beneath his armor Arc is a skeleton (causing her to freak out and try to explode him when she sees him without armor). Her feelings about Arc seem complicated; she continually acts as though exasperated with Arc and occasionally needles him, but in Volume 2 of the light novel series when her sister Eevin teases her about having a man in her life, "For a moment, the face of a skeleton outfitted in majestic armor flashed through Ariane's mind", in Volume 4 she is extremely distressed when his exposure to the waters of the magic pool render him unconscious for five days, and his culinary skills astonish her (apparently she either isn't very good at cooking or just doesn't know how).
Ponta (ポンタ)
Voiced by: Nene Hieda (Japanese); Emi Lo (English)
A cotton-tailed fox with greenish fur and a white-furred underbelly, referred to by elves and beast people as a "spirit creature". While Ponta's gender is unknown in the light novels, it is referred to as being female in the anime. In the light novel series, Arc finds it imprisoned in a cage, while in the anime he comes across it in the forest; in both cases, the creature has been injured and he uses his magic to heal it. In return, it becomes attached to him and joins him as his inseparable companion, and he names it Ponta. Because "spirit creatures" like Ponta almost never form attachments to humans (and rarely to elves), Ponta's connection with Arc reassures elves and beast people as to Arc's good intentions and reliability. Its favorite perches are either on top of his helmet or on one of his shoulder pauldrons, although it has taken to riding on Ariane's shoulder at times.
Chiyome (チヨメ)
Voiced by: Miyu Tomita (Japanese); Sarah Wiedenheft (English)
A beast girl and one of the six ninjas of the Jinshin clan on an ongoing mission to locate and free enslaved beast people. Though physically the size of a young girl, she is extremely fast, skillful in combat and adept at using a type of Water ninjutsu. "Chiyome" is not her actual name, and Arc deduces that she was given the name in honor of the famous kunoichi Mochizuki Chiyome. Chapter 2.5 of Volume 5 of the light novels reveals her real name: "Mia", and her backstory reveals that she is an orphan (her father had been enslaved by human and worked to death and her mother had been killed protecting Chiyome after their escape from captivity) and had been taken into the Jinshin Clan at her own request. Arc and Ariane assist her and fellow ninja Goemon in freeing the enslaved beast people in Olav and totally destroying the slave markets. As the light novel series progresses, she at first provides them with intel as to the location of human nobles involves in the elf slave trade and later joins them full time on their travels, becoming close friends with Ariane along the way. Naturally, in both the light novels and anime she freaks out when she first sees Arc's unhelmeted face, but she overcomes this and accepts/respects him as an ally and friend. Arc also sees her as a good friend, but her sometimes stoic demeanor and attitude make him unsure of her feelings towards him.
Danka (ダンカ)
Voiced by: Takuya Eguchi (Japanese); David Matranga (English)
Danka Niel Maple, an elf warrior from the city of Maple. His mission was to investigate the town of Diento to find the location of captured and enslaved elves. While initially suspicious of Arc, he comes to respect Arc's abilities and accept him (for the time being) as a comrade-in-arms (although, in Volume 6 of the light novel series, he makes it clear that, despite Arc's officially becoming a member of Lalatoya, he still views Arc with suspicion).
Dillan (ディラン, Diran)
Voiced by: Kohsuke Toriumi (Japanese); Matthew David Rudd (English)
Dillan Tahg Lalatoya, the Elder of the elf settlement of Lalatoya and the father of Ariane and Eevin. In the light novel series, he is described as "a twenty- to thirty-year-old elven man with long, green-tinted blond hair", while in the anime he is tall, green-blond-haired and slenderly built with a short Van Dyke beard. He officially hires Arc to assist Ariane with her mission of freeing enslaved elves and later acts as an envoy to various human kingdoms (much to his wife's annoyance, since this takes him away from home for long periods of time).
Glenys (グレニス, Gurenisu)
Voiced by: Yūko Minaguchi (Japanese); Katelyn Barr (English)
Glenys Alna Lalatoya, the wife of Elder Dillan who physically appears to be in her 30's but is (according to her) 100 years old (in the anime, she says that she "just turned 170 this year, and that number isn't changing", causing Ariane to tell Arc that her mother is really 245 years old). She is described in the light novel series as having "amethyst-colored skin and...white hair tied back in braids", while in the anime she has the same pale skin and pink hair as both her daughters. While an excellent homemaker and housekeeper, she is also a master of swordsmanship and tells Arc that she trained both of her daughters, and with her uncanny skill and speed has no trouble in easily vanquishing the larger, more physically powerful Arc in practice combat sessions. In the light novels, she appears to act as Elder of Lalatoya whenever her husband is away on Council business and has become both Arc and Chiyome's combat trainer.
Eevin (イビン, Ibin)
Voiced by: Rumi Okubo (Japanese); Lisette Monique (English)
Ariane's older sister and a famous elf warrior whom Ariane aspires to emulate, which makes it all the more shocking to Ariane when she learns that Eevin is getting married soon. Whatever her reputation and skill as a warrior, Eevin seems to absolutely adore her younger sister (whom she has nicknamed "Arin") and behaves ultra-girlishly in interacting with her, even physically glomping onto Ariane; in the anime, despite her being Ariane's older sister, she looks and acts younger than Ariane. In Book 7 of the light novel series, she confesses her annoyance to a friend that she hasn't been able to keep in contact with Ariane because "[Arc] and Arin have just been teleporting all over the place", and she can never look at Arc without glaring at him, suggesting a growing jealousy that Arc might be displacing Eevin in Ariane's affections.
Goemon (ゴエモン)
Voiced by: Ryōta Takeuchi (Japanese); Jarrod Greene (English)
A beast-man and one of the six ninjas of the Jinshin clan. Physically, he matches Arc in size and strength (with eyes that seem to have no pupils), and the two instantly become friends. "Goemon" is not his actual name, and Arc deduces that he was given the name in honor of Ishikawa Goemon. Goemon's Rock ninjutsu and Arc's Rock magic are able to resonate with each other to reach a state of almost uncontrollable power. In battle, he and Chiyome act as partners.
Sekt (セクト, Sekuto)
Voiced by: Kengo Kawanishi (Japanese); Grant Paulsen (English)
Sekt Rondahl Karlon Rhoden Sahdiay, the eldest son of King Karlon of Rhoden, engaged against his younger siblings Dakares and Yuriarna in a power struggle to successfully succeed to the throne of Rhoden. He is secretly backed by the Great West Revlon Empire. Although more polished in his outward showing (although both Arc and Ariane sense something "fake" about him when they first meet him in Volume 7 of the light novel series), he seems to be as ruthless as Dakares, not hesitating to have Dakares assassinated and frame him for Yuriarna's supposed assassination, and now recognizes that Yuriarna, thanks to her successful negotiations with the elves and growing public popularity, is a serious rival. He has also become very wary of Arc since learning of Arc's abilities and incredible power and witnessing them at first-hand.
Dakares (ダカレス, Dakaresu)
Voiced by: Daiki Hamano (Japanese); Bradley Gareth (English)
Dakares Ciciay Karlon Rhoden Vetran, the second son of King Karlon of Rhoden. It is revealed that he is secretly but actively participating in the elf and beast people slave trade in violation of a 400-year-old peace treaty with the elves. He was secretly backed by the Holy East Revlon Empire in order to gain power for an eventual coup d'etat.
Yuriarna (ユリアーナ, Yuriāna)
Voiced by: Saori Ōnishi (Japanese); Danielle Yoshiko Phillips (English)
Yuriarna Merol Melissa Rhoden Olav, the second daughter of King Karlon of Rhoden, highly intelligent and politically savvy, and possibly the most honorable and reliable of all the king's children, always putting the welfare of the people first. After the events in Diento, she is entrusted with and dispatched by her father on a diplomatic mission to open negotiations with the elves. En route to the Grand Duchy of Limbult, her carriage and escort are attacked and she herself is assassinated, but revived (unknown to her) by Arc's Rejuvenation magic. Reaching Limbult in safety, she keeps her survival secret and successfully completes her mission, in the process gaining the elves' support for her bid for succession to the Rhoden throne.
Domitianus (ドミティアヌス, Domitianusu)
Voiced by: Akira Ishida (Japanese); Clifford Chapin (English)
Domitianus Revlon Valiafelbe, the totally ruthless and amoral ruler of the Holy East Revlon Empire, in which the slave trade in elves and beast people is completely legal. It appears that he is intent on destabilizing the Rhoden Kingdom using controlled monsters to terrorize populations and using them as part of his armed forces as part of his eventual plans for invasion; in the anime however, Arc has (currently unknown to either Domitianus or even himself) been foiling Domitianus' plan by defeating the controlled monsters that cross his path, at which time the control rings attached to the monsters shatter and vanish.
Cetrion (セトリオン, Setorion)
Voiced by: Minoru Shiraishi (Japanese); Aaron Campbell (English)
Cetrion du Olsterio, who is supposedly Dakares' right-hand man. He arranges for the attack on Yuriarna's carriage and her assassination. However, his assassination of Dakares and (in the light novel series) later killing his own father (falsely claiming that he was part of Dakares' plot to assassinate Yuriarna) prove his actual loyalty to Sekt.
Sasuke
Sasuke, one of the six best ninjas in the Jinshin Clan. He trained Chiyome in ninjutsu and more ninja skills. But in one of his infiltration missions, he had disappeared and declared missing by the village, leading Chiyome to investigate his disappearance. The two later on met, revealing that he's became a controlled corpse puppet. In their final duel, she defeated him, and disintegrated.

== Media ==
=== Light novel ===
Written by Ennki Hakari with illustrations by KeG, Skeleton Knight in Another World is published by Overlap under Overlap Novels imprint since June 25, 2015, with 10 volumes released as of May 2021. Seven Seas Entertainment licensed the series on September 20, 2018, and released the first volume on June 11, 2019.

No.	Original release date	Original ISBN	English release date		English ISBN
No.	Original release date	Original ISBN	Digital	Physical	English ISBN
1	June 25, 2015	978-4-86-554054-3	March 28, 2019	June 11, 2019	978-1-64-275064-5
2	October 25, 2015	978-4-86-554075-8	June 20, 2019	September 24, 2019	978-1-64-275129-1
3	March 25, 2016	978-4-86-554109-0	August 8, 2019	October 15, 2019	978-1-64-275706-4
4	July 25, 2016	978-4-86-554146-5	November 14, 2019	February 25, 2020	978-1-64-505195-4
5	November 25, 2016	978-4-86-554169-4	February 27, 2020	August 18, 2020	978-1-64-505464-1
6	April 25, 2017	978-4-86-554209-7	June 4, 2020	September 8, 2020	978-1-64-505725-3
7	August 25, 2017	978-4-86-554249-3	August 20, 2020	December 1, 2020	978-1-64-505795-6
8	March 25, 2018	978-4-86-554318-6	November 5, 2020	February 23, 2021	978-1-64-505977-6
9	March 25, 2019	978-4-86-554432-9	May 27, 2021	August 3, 2021	978-1-64-827204-2
10	March 25, 2022	978-4-86-554549-4	February 9, 2023	April 11, 2023	978-1-64-827264-6

=== Manga ===
In February 2017, the first chapter of the manga adaptation by Akira Sawano was published in Overlap's Comic Gardo; though Akira is the author of the manga series, character designs are credited to KeG. Overlap collected the individual chapters into tankōbon volumes, with the first volume released in August 2017. In September 2018, Seven Seas Entertainment announced its licensing of the manga series for localization in North America under the title Skeleton Knight in Another World.

No.	Original release date	Original ISBN	English release date	English ISBN
1	August 25, 2017	978-4-86-554252-3	July 9, 2019	978-1-64-275065-2
2	February 2, 2018	978-4-86-554322-3	November 12, 2019	978-1-64-275729-3
3	September 25, 2018	978-4-86-554398-8	March 24, 2020	978-1-64-505224-1
4	March 25, 2019	978-4-86-554468-8	August 11, 2020	978-1-64-505643-0
5	September 25, 2019	978-4-86-554552-4	December 1, 2020	978-1-64-505814-4
6	February 25, 2020	978-4-86-554619-4	May 4, 2021	978-1-64-827214-1
7	August 25, 2020	978-4-86-554733-7	August 24, 2021	978-1-64-827315-5
8	April 25, 2021	978-4-86-554904-1	April 26, 2022	978-1-63858-226-7
9	September 25, 2021	978-4-82-400011-8	September 27, 2022	978-1-63858-666-1
10	March 25, 2022	978-4-8240-0141-2	May 30, 2023	978-1-68579-525-2
11	July 25, 2022	978-4-8240-0254-9	October 24, 2023	978-1-68579-938-0
12	March 25, 2023	978-4-8240-0453-6	March 26, 2024	979-8-88843-381-2
13	April 25, 2024	978-4-8240-0813-8	December 31, 2024	979-8-89160-657-9
14	June 25, 2025	978-4-8240-1234-0	March 24, 2026	979-8-89561-714-4
15	June 20, 2026	978-4-8240-1703-1	—	—
SS	July 20, 2026	978-4-8240-1759-8	—	—

=== Anime ===
An anime television series adaptation was announced on April 17, 2021. It is animated by Studio Kai and Hornets and directed by Katsumi Ono, with Takeshi Kikuchi supervising the series' scripts, Tōru Imanishi designing the characters, and eba and Tsubasa Ito composing the series' music. The series aired from April 7 to June 23, 2022, on AT-X and other networks. The opening theme song is "Aa, Waga Roman no Michi Yo" (嗚呼、我が浪漫の道よ; Ah, My Romantic Road), performed by PelleK, while the ending theme song is "Bokura ga Oroka da Nante Dare ga Itta" (僕らが愚かだなんて誰が言った; Who Called Us Fools?), performed by DIALOGUE+. Crunchyroll streamed the series worldwide outside of Asia. Muse Communication announced the license for South and Southeast Asia the day after the anime announcement. On April 11, 2022, Crunchyroll announced that the series would receive an English dub, which premiered on April 28 of the same year.

A second season was announced at the Overlap Bunko 10th anniversary event on December 15, 2024. Toshizo Nemoto replaced Takeshi Kikuchi as the scriptwriter, and Aura Studio took over production of the second season, replacing Studio Kai and Hornets. The season premiered on July 4, 2026. The ending theme song is "Kiseki wa Okinai" (奇跡は起きない; Miracles Don't Happen), performed by DIALOGUE+.

==== Episode list ====
===== Season 1 (2022) =====
No. overall	No. in season	Title	Directed by	Written by	Storyboarded by	Original release date
1	1	"The Wandering Knight Sets Out to Make the World a Better Place"; Transliteration: "Rurō no Kishi, Yonaoshi Tabi nite Sōrō" (Japanese: 流浪の騎士、世直し旅にて候ふ)	Shigatsu Yoshikawa	Takeshi Kikuchi	Katsumi Ono	April 7, 2022
Two young girls in the forest are about to be raped by bandits when they are saved by a giant knight in silver armor. Hours previously the knight, really a gamer from Japan, had awoken in the body of his character, an 8 foot tall skeleton with the best armour and weapons and all his physical and magical skills. Knowing a skeleton would scare people and make him a target, he decides to keep his helmet on at all times and renames himself Arc, using his game character's name. He spots a female elf in the first city he finds, but she disappears. As he has no money, he attempts to become an adventurer but must earn his license by slaying three enemies. In the forest he slays a bull-boar and an orc, and while searching for a third enemy witnesses bandits attacking a coach. He wonders if he should risk getting involved until he sees two young ladies about to be raped and violently kills the bandits. The ladies are the noble Lauren Luvierte and her maid Rita. While they recover, Arc covertly loots all the bandits' valuables before escorting them to town. With the bandits and orc slain, he obtains his license and his first meal (with the bandits' cash). Reasoning that he might be stuck in this new world permanently, Arc decides to have fun beginning his new life.
2	2	"A First Job, a Girl's Wish, and an Approaching Shadow"; Transliteration: "Hatsu Shigoto, Shōjo no Negai to Shinobiyoru Kage" (Japanese: 初仕事、少女の願いと忍び寄る影)	Shigatsu Yoshikawa	Takeshi Kikuchi	Shigatsu Yoshikawa	April 14, 2022
Arc accepts a job protecting a young girl named Marca as she collects medicinal herbs. Arc is curious about Marca's haste to begin, and Marca explains that she doesn't want her mother Seona, who has become overprotective since Marca's father died, to find out. They come across an injured Kitsune which Arc heals; the creature decides it wants to stay with Arc, and he names it Ponta. Seona learns of Marca's leaving the village just as hunters arrive with news of an extra-dangerous monster in the forest. Marca leads Arc to a tree with valuable medicinal flowers, but finds the tree is now the territory of the monster, a Basilisk. Arc kills it quickly; however, he asks Marca to keep this a secret for fear of drawing unwanted attention. He notices a magic ring on the basilisk, which shatters and disappears after the monster is killed. He returns Marca to Seona, along with a giant boar for the villagers to feast on, then departs. Later that night, soldiers kill another ring-wearing basilisk, then encounter the corpse of the basilisk Arc killed. They notice it was killed by a single strike and wonder who killed it, while Arc and Ponta eat dinner in town.
3	3	"An Austere Elf Dances for Her Comrades"; Transliteration: "Ririshiki Erufu wa Dōhō ga Tame ni Mau" (Japanese: 凛々しきエルフは同胞が為に舞う)	Kei Miura	Takeshi Kikuchi	Taisuke Tsukuda	April 21, 2022
Arc defeats several bandits in a cave, and notices several empty cages. Elsewhere, it is revealed the attack on Lauren Luvierte was a failed assassination ordered by Lord Tryton Diento, who was himself ordered by Prince Dakares to destabilize the kingdom in readiness for a war. In addition, Tryton's son Udolan is leading their illegal slave-trading operation. Back in the forest, a female elf named Ariane watches Arc emerging from the bandits' cave and attacks him, accusing him of kidnapping elf children. However, she notices Ponta and recognizes it as a spirit creature; since spirit creatures rarely trust mortals, she realizes Arc is not a kidnapper. Arc offers his assistance, but she refuses. The next day, Arc finds the kidnapped elves being tortured by Udolan and his men. Ariane returns to kill most of the slavers, but is forced to surrender when Udolan threatens the children. Arc overpowers Udolan, allowing Ariane to kill Udolan's subordinates. Arc then frees the captives and magically heals their wounds, to Ariane's amazement. Refusing to believe that Arc is a simple adventurer but convinced of his trustworthiness, Ariane introduces herself to him. She receives a message that more enslaved elves have been located and asks Arc if she can hire his services.
4	4	"Infiltrating the Slave Market! In Search of the World's Evil"; Transliteration: "Sennyū, Doreishō! Yo ni Habikoru Aku o Sagure" (Japanese: 潜入、奴隷商！世に蔓延る悪を探れ)	Yukio Takahashi	Takeshi Kikuchi	Takumi Narita	April 28, 2022
After Arc accepts Ariane's offer to hire him, they travel to the town of Diento where they meet Ariane's elf comrade Danka. Danka immediately mistrusts Arc, but is positively surprised that Arc is skilled at magic and has earned Ponta's trust. In the hours before they attack the slavers' warehouse, Arc leaves Ariane and Danka so he can eat without them seeing his skeletal face. Ariane shares her perceived failure with Danka, as she had to be saved by Arc, and compares herself unfavorably to her sister Eevin. When Arc, Ariane and Danka infiltrate the slavers' warehouse, they find that all the slavers have been expertly killed. Arc encounters the assassin, who is a female ninja with cat ears. Seeing Ponta, the ninja realizes that Arc is trustworthy and gives him documents she stole naming nobles who have purchased enslaved elves, as well as sharing the location of slaves kept by Lord Tryton. Before departing, she also reveals that the elf slaves were not her goal, as her true target is elsewhere. After the trio free the elves, Danka trusts Arc and Ariane to go without him to Tryton's palace. Watching from a distance with a taller companion, the female ninja hopes to meet Arc again.
5	5	"A Secret Revealed, and a Bond Forged"; Transliteration: "Akasareru Himitsu to Tsumugareru Kizuna" (Japanese: 明かされる秘密と紡がれる絆)	Yoshinori Odaka	Takeshi Kikuchi	Katsumi Ono	May 5, 2022
After their attempt to silently enter the castle goes somewhat awry, Arc and Ariane capture Tryton and Udolan, and the two female elf slaves (whom Tryton had been sexually molesting) take their revenge on Tryton while Arc discovers a hidden treasure which he loots for himself (telling Ariane that his taking the gold is simply to prevent the slavers from using it to rebuild their organization). Explosions abruptly rock the palace, which Arc suspects was caused by the ninja. Ariane invites Arc to visit the Elf Lands so they can continue rescuing slaves, although they would need an Elder Elf's permission for Arc to enter their lands. Because he will have to expose himself while meeting the Elder, Arc removes his helmet, showing Ariane his skull face and telling her his appearance is the result of a curse. Although initially shocked by Arc's appearance, Ariane promises that all elves will keep his secret and hopes the Elder may know how to fix his appearance. In the capital city of Olav, the human King Karlon, his sons Sekt and Dakares and daughter Yuriarna decide to investigate the rumors of slavery, which violates the human/elf peace treaty. They decide to contact the elves, though it is clear both princes have their own hidden agendas. Yuriarna is certain Dakares is secretly involved in the slave trade and that Sekt has a plan to expose him, thereby strengthening his own claim to the throne. She decides to make sure that contacting the elves goes well and reaches out to her sister Seriarna, who married the ruler of the Limbult duchy, the only domain currently trading with the Elf Lands. After a journey of some days, Arc and Ariane reach Lalatoya, an enormous elf settlement deep in the forest.
6	6	"Learning About the Darkness of This World at the Elf Village"; Transliteration: "Erufu no Sato de Fureru Isekai no Shin'en" (Japanese: エルフの里で触れる異世界の深淵)	Arata Nishizuki	Toshizō Nemoto	Toshinori Fukushima	May 12, 2022
Arc meets the Elder, Dillan, and his wife Glenys, who are also Ariane's parents. Dillan is grateful that the slaves were rescued, but worries that their attack on Tryton's palace has proved problematic, and he and Ariane travel to the elven capital of Maple to informs his fellow Elders. Back in Lalatoya, Glenys spars with Arc to see if he is strong enough to keep Ariane safe, and Arc is beaten by Glenys multiple times, making him realize that high combat stats do not necessarily equal skill. The Elders, unwilling to risk war, decide to continue rescuing slaves in secret. Ariane is surprised to learn that her older sister Eevin is getting married, as she had always sworn to never marry. Arc decides to have a bath, but when Ariane enters the bath naked, she sees Arc in full skeleton mode, panics and blasts him with explosions. Dillan officially hires Arc to help Ariane continue freeing slaves and as payment tells Arc of a magic pool that might cure his skeletal appearance, but which is only found near the Lord Crown, a spirit tree that grows in the territories of Dragon Lords, the most dangerous dragons in the world. Arc accepts the "payment", but when alone becomes curious to see if his appearance really is caused by a curse, and is shocked when, using a curse-breaking spell on himself, he gives himself a human right hand.
7	7	"A Miracle for the High-Minded Princess"; Transliteration: "Risō ni Moyuru Ōjo ni Kiseki ga Maiorita" (Japanese: 理想に燃ゆる王女に奇跡が舞い降りた)	Yoshinori Odaka	Toshizō Nemoto	Yoshinori Odaka	May 19, 2022
Arc's hand instantly returns to bone, but it confirms that Arc's appearance is indeed cursed. He and Ariane set out for Olav, hunting the slave-owning nobles. They are warned by an innkeeper that Haunted Wolves have been attacking travelers. Yuriarna leaves Olav to travel to Limbult. Ariane considers hunting the wolves, as a bridal veil made from their tail fur would be an excellent wedding gift for Eevin. The wolves do attack, and Arc realizes the pack leader is wearing a magic ring like the basilisk. He destroys the ring, waking the pack leader from a trance; the leader then takes his pack and leaves peacefully. Arc is certain the rings are the reason monsters are acting strangely. While Ariane prepares the slain wolves' fur, Ponta senses danger and leads Arc to where Yuriarna's coach has been attacked and Yuriarna, her maid Ferna and her loyal guards have been killed by treacherous guards and assassins. The killers attack him, but Arc's armor proves invulnerable to their weapons and magic, and he kills most of them with unexpected assistance from the wolves. Using a powerful Rejuvenation spell, Arc resurrects Yuriarna, Ferna and several loyal guards before sneaking away. Seeing Arc while half-conscious, Yuriarna believes him to be an angel sent by God. Arc is unsure about the morality of a spell that can resurrect the dead and keeps what he did secret from Ariane. Reaching Olav, they witness a young woman expertly defeating thugs, and Arc recognizes her as the cat-eared ninja.
8	8	"Allied! Dashing Through the Darkness With the Beastpeople!"; Transliteration: "Kyōtō! Jūjin no Tomo to Yamiyo o Kakeru" (Japanese: 共闘！獣人の友と闇夜を駆ける)	Yukio Takahashi	Toshizō Nemoto	Minoru Ōhara	May 26, 2022
The ninja, Chiyome of the Jinshin clan, is searching for members of her species enslaved by humans and asks Arc how he knows about ninja, since that word was created by their Great Founder, a human named Hanzo, whom Arc realizes must be another Japanese person who came to this world and founded a ninja clan centuries ago. Chiyome asks for their help and Ariane, as Arc's "employer", agrees. Dakares is furious the Haunted Wolves failed to kill Yuriana and, suspecting a revenge plot against him, is sent to a safe house by his subordinate Cetrion. Chiyome asks Arc and Ariane to attack Etzat Slave Market as obviously as possible, thereby distracting the city guards so that the ninja can infiltrate the other markets. Arc hides his unique armor under a cloak and tribal mask. Chiyome introduces Goemon, a fellow ninja, causing Arc to realize Hanzo named himself after Hattori Hanzō and used the names of other famous ninja as honorary titles (meaning Chiyome is named after Mochizuki Chiyome and Goemon after Ishikawa Goemon). As Goemon is a giant as tall and powerfully built as Arc, they instinctively challenge each other, then, realizing that they're evenly matched, become instant friends. Arc and Goemon attack the market guards via the main entrance and compete to outdo each other, but go overboard and accidentally bury themselves under falling rock as Chiyome and Ariane prepare their own attack from the rear.
9	9	"The Capital in Chaos and a Maiden's Oath"; Transliteration: "Yureugoku Ōto to Otome no Chikai" (Japanese: 揺れ動く王都と乙女の誓い)	Satoru Fujimoto	Toshizō Nemoto	Satoru Fujimoto	June 2, 2022
Learning of the attack, Dakares sends soldiers to protect the slave markets. Ariane and Chiyome begin freeing slaves while dispatching the guards. Goemon sends Arc to join up with Ariane and Chiyome while he holds off arriving reinforcements. The beast people are easily freed, but Arc, Ariane and Chiyome also find a cell full of dead slaves killed or left to die for being unsellable as too old, injured or sick. Arc teleports the survivors to safety, then rejoins Goemon to massacre the soldiers and utterly destroy the market. After the destruction is completed, Arc and Goemon retrieve the dead slaves for a proper funeral and Chiyome swears to hone her skills to save even more people. Cetrion murders Dakares, revealing he was working for Sekt all along; since Yuriarna has not been located, Sekt frames the dead Dakares for Yuriarna's apparent murder, leaving him sole heir to the throne of Rhoden. Yuriarna arrives in Limbult and learns from Seriarna of Dakares' death, realizing Sekt probably plotted her murder as well, and decides to keep her survival a secret for the time being. Chiyome reveals to Ariane that Dakares was working for the Holy Revlon Empire and sent them many elf slaves. Ariane and Arc decide to travel there immediately. In the capital city of the Holy Revlon Empire, Emperor Domitianus is impressed that Sekt has eliminated both Dakares and Yuriarna, but is more surprised someone destroyed the rings he had sent Dakares to that control the wolves and basilisks. His subordinate confirms that Domitianus' agent, Fumba, is continuing to work to destabilize Rhoden. In the desert beyond Rhoden, a sneering Fumba watches as worm-like monsters erupting from the sands capture and devour flying wyverns.
10	10	"Hope for the Future Found in the Desert"; Transliteration: "Sabaku de Mitsukeshi Asu e no Kibō" (Japanese: 砂漠で見つけし明日への希望)	Shigatsu Yoshikawa	Takeshi Kikuchi	Shigatsu Yoshikawa	June 9, 2022
After a rather electrifying encounter with a flock of wyverns, Arc and Ariane reach a village on the edge of the desert. Arc notices that Ariane is unusually nervous and learns that the slave trade in elves is legal in Revlon, so she is worried about travelling there. At the village tavern, an elf, Carcy Held, introduces himself and explains that he is able to coexist with the villagers and makes a living studying monsters. He asks for Arc's help in catching difficult monsters, offering a map of Revlon as payment. Ariane struggles with the idea of coexistence, and over a cask of wine that evening in their room Arc unfortunately discovers that Ariane is both a lightweight and a bad drunk. The next morning, Ariane is furious to discover that her antics while intoxicated have caused the villagers to think that she and Arc had had sex all night (with Arc's comments not helping the situation much). Carcy plans to capture a Sand Worm using goblin carcasses as bait, while Ariane is still trying recover from her hangover plus travel motion sickness. Suddenly they are attacked by a worm that has grown far larger than natural, and only Arc is strong enough to defeat it. Another ring is seen on the Sand Worm, but shatters and disappears after the worm's defeat. Carcy tells Ariane that he also once hated humans but grew to care about them, and reveals that Lamburt, a duchy in Rhoden, is governed by a human lord and his elven wife, with whom he fell in love after rescuing her from slavery, and Ariane begins to become more optimistic. The worms' unnatural growth is revealed to be caused by Fumba, who has been feeding them and other monsters slaves and kidnapped villagers, on behalf of Emperor Domitianus.
11	11	"The Monster-Taming Barbarian Laughs in the Darkness"; Transliteration: "Banzoku no Majūtsukai wa Yami ni Warau" (Japanese: 蛮族の魔獣使いは闇に嗤う)	Toshinori Fukushima	Takeshi Kikuchi	Minoru Ōhara	June 16, 2022
Arc, Ariane and Ponta arrive at the border town of Kaysehk. In order to find the captured elves, they separate and Arc learns that strange cries have been heard late at night from a fortress to the east and that people have been mysteriously disappearing. On his way to meet up with Ariane, Arc rescues a street girl from three kidnappers (the girl being pretty and clinging gratefully to Arc doesn't sit well with Ariane). The failed kidnappers, who were working for Fumba to collect "food" for his controlled monsters, are punished by being fed to his giant white tiger monster. Ariane has learned that captured elves had been brought to the fortress four months before and insists on investigating the fortress. Sneaking in and finding a secret passageway, they arrive at an underground chamber where they confront Fumba. Suddenly, Ariane attacks Arc, bewitched into believing she is training with her sister Eevin. Arc spots an imp hidden inside Ariane's cloak hood; Ponta rips it out and Arc destroys it, freeing Ariane from its control. Fumba reveals that he is a Rozombanya Monster Sorcerer who can make monsters obey him. Arc questions him about the elves, but Fumba tells him that most of the elves were used in the Empire's magic experiments while he used the remainder as "food" for his "pet". Enraged, Arc quickly kills the white tiger monster, and Fumba orders his other controlled monsters to attack. Arc is easily able to slay the monsters, but when an ogre attacks the unconscious Ariane, Chiyome appears and uses her Water ninjutsu to overcome it, telling Fumba that the other Jinshin ninja have already dealt with his other monsters. Suddenly the ground begins shaking and Fumba flees, saying his greatest monster has awoken. Arc teleports everyone outside, where they are confronted by a five-headed Hydra.
12	12	"I Shall Cut Through the World's Evils!"; Transliteration: "Konoyo no Aku o Ware wa Kiru!" (Japanese: 異世界(このよ)の悪を我は斬る！)	Yukio Takahashi	Takeshi Kikuchi	Katsumi Ono	June 23, 2022
The hydra attacks Arc, Ariane and Chiyome with its fiery breath, leading Fumba to believe they have been destroyed. Fumba sends the hydra to destroy Kaysehk, while a flashback reveals that Fumba's clan Elders believed him undisciplined and weak, causing him to leave his Clan and take service with Emperor Domitianus. Arc uses his Holy Shield to protect everyone, and Ariane (who, even while bewitched, was aware of everything Fumba had previously said about the elves' fates) vows to destroy him. They split up, with Ariane and Chiyome chasing after Fumba while Arc stays behind to deal with the hydra. Before the hydra can reach Kaysehk, Arc summons the Infernal Demon Ifrit to battle the hydra. Ariane and Chiyome catch up with Fumba, and Ariane taunts him with his personal weakness. When Fumba is goaded enough to attack Ariane, Chiyome attacks him and damages the magical body markings that allow him to control monsters. Ariane's fiery sword destroys Fumba's whip and the flames consume him. With the hydra damaged by Ifrit's attack, Arc flings it into the air and Ifrit destroys it with its flames. Meanwhile, Princess Yuriarna meets with Elven Elders Dillan and Lord Fangas, and they agree that the Rhoden Kingdom will take responsibility for the crimes against the elves, locate the missing/enslaved elves and defend elven territories in exchange for the elves backing Yuriarna in her bid for succession to the Rhoden throne. After learning this news (via Danka's Whispering Fowl), which means Ariane's mission is now officially over, Ariane is uneasy and uncertain about the future, but Arc and Chiyome reassure her. Sekt is disturbed by the news of Yuriarna surviving the assassination attempt and successfully negotiating with the elves; Yuriarna ponders her own destiny after her miraculous revival; Domitianus learns about the destruction of Fumba and his monsters; Chiyome sees Arc's unhelmeted face for the first time; and Arc decides to continue his travels with his friends.

===== Season 2 (2026) =====
No. overall	No. in season	Title	Directed by	Written by	Storyboarded by	Original release date
13	1	"Duel to the Death? Silver Knight VS Silver Knight!"; Transliteration: "Shitō? Shirogane no Kishi Tai Shirogane no Kishi!" (Japanese: 死闘？ 白銀の騎士対白銀の騎士！)	Yukio Takahashi	Toshizō Nemoto	Katsumi Ono	July 4, 2026
While traveling, Arc and his companions foil a slaver using orcs to kidnap women, earning a village feast and hot spring access. However, Ariane worries they are drifting further from Dragon Lord territory—and the magic pool needed to cure Arc's curse—because Arc insists on helping everyone they encounter. Their detours also delay Chiyome from reaching her hidden ninja village. At the next village, the group is initially met with fear. Arc heals an injured child, prompting the mother to explain that the villagers mistook them for "Silver Dark Knight" and "Dark Elf Terror." Realizing bandits are impersonating them during kidnappings, Ariane and Chiyome act as helpless travellers to get themselves kidnapped, allowing them to infiltrate the gang hideout. Meanwhile, in Limbult, Yuriarna arranges a meeting with Sekt to uncover his plans. At the hideout, the bandits' boss is revealed to be Udolan, who is terrified to encounter Arc again. Arc easily defeats the impersonators, Udolan's magically controlled horde of goblins, and a Goblin Lord. Captured, Udolan confesses that foreign merchants are driving up slave prices and even provided the goblins. Chiyome departs for her village, and Ariane asks Arc to make another detour nearby.
14	2	"The Toxic Fangs of Assassination Target the Elvish Bride"; Transliteration: "Erufu no Hanatome ni Semarishi, Ansatsu no Dokuga" (Japanese: エルフの花嫁に迫りし、暗殺の毒牙)	Madoka Yaguchi	Shin Yoshida	Minoru Ōhara	July 13, 2026
Ariane and Arc visit Lord Lamburt's territory, now ruled by his progressive son Petros, who recently married the elf Toreasa after imprisoning his corrupt, elf-hating father. When Petros reveals ongoing assassination attempts against Toreasa by poisoning, Arc investigates. After finding the suspicious behaviour of two palace guards to be innocent misunderstandings, Ariane focuses instead on Lamburt. Disguising Arc as a statue inside Lamburt's bedroom, Arc discovers Lamburt is using a talking cockatoo to plot the next assassination when Petros and Toreasa visit the grave of Petros' mother. Arc and Ariane successfully foil the cemetery ambush, but learn Petros hid Toreasa with Rovelis, the castle poison tester. Deducing everything was planned in advance, including the previous failed assassinations, Ariane realises who the true assassin is and manages to stop Rovelis poisoning Toreasa. Exposed as hating elves and being loyal to Lamburt, Rovelis leaps off a cliff, but Arc saves her, insisting she live to witness the eventual peace between elves and humans. With the threat resolved, Ariane hopes Petros and Toreasa can create a better future. She receives an urgent message from Danke warning of dozens of indiscriminate kidnappings targeting elves, beastmen and even humans in Rhoden Kingdom.
15	3	"The Fall of Villains and the Dance of Sibling Love"; Transliteration: "Akutō Sange to Kyōdai Kizuna no Mai" (Japanese: 悪党散華と兄妹絆の舞)	Kazuo Nogami	Yasuyuki Suzuki	Susumu Nishizawa	July 20, 2026
Arc and Ariane travel to Hoban City, a multi-species trading hub suspected of being the source of the kidnappings. On their first night at the inn, Ariane accidentally eats a meat dish containing alcohol, gets drunk, and blows up their room. The next day, they witness a street performer named Shil signal bandits to kidnap Ariane. Though the bandits escape, Arc captures Shil. Learning Arc possesses healing magic, Shil confesses that he accidentally broke his sister Shia's leg during a performance. Unable to afford treatment, he agreed to identify valuable kidnap targets for the bandits in exchange for money. Meanwhile, the bandits decide to flee the city with their captives. Arc heals Shia's leg, but when they raid the kidnapper's hideout, they find it abandoned and discover the bandits have kidnapped Shia in their absence. Arc and Ariane track down the carriage, rescue the captives, and kill the kidnappers, learning they intended to sell their victims in foreign countries the same as Udolan. With Shia and Shil safely reunited and performing again, Ariane receives an urgent message from her sister Eevin to return home immediately. Elsewhere, a mysterious man commands an undead army.
16	4	"The Saint's Spirit Wanders the Cursed Sanctuary"; Transliteration: "Noroi no Sato ni Seijo no Rei ga Samayō" (Japanese: 呪いの里に聖女の霊が彷徨う)	Tsutomu Murakami	Toshizō Nemono	Minoru Ōhara	July 27, 2026
Arc and Ariane join Eevin on a mission. Though older than Ariane, Eevin behaves far more childishly. After testing Arc in combat, Eevin deems him unworthy of being Ariane's romantic partner, despite Ariane's insistence that their relationship is strictly platonic. Eevin then easily defeats Ariane in a duel, leaving Ariane disappointed, though Arc reassures her she has grown stronger since they first met. Eevin reveals her mission target: Dennel Village's "Leeza Sanctuary", a haven for freed elf slaves run by Leeza and her merchant husband, Yakof. Because no elves from the sanctuary have ever actually reached home, Eevin suspects the couple is secretly re-selling them into slavery. Infiltrating as refugees, Ariane and Eevin discover Yakof running the refuge alone following Leeza's mysterious disappearance. They meet an elf named Pamela and her fiancé, Bart. Sensing something sinister in Leeza's locked bedroom, they call Arc to investigate covertly. Overnight, Pamela and Bart mysteriously vanish. Investigating Leeza's room, the group discovers a hidden tunnel filled with undead miasma, just as a swarm of skeletons suddenly rushes at them from the darkness.
17	5	"Terror! Shadows of Undeath Lurking Down Below"; Transliteration: "Kyōfu! Chitei ni Ugomeku Shiryō no Kage" (Japanese: 恐怖！ 地底に蠢く死霊の影)	Yukio Takahashi	Toshizō Nemoto	Minoru Ōhara	August 3, 2026
Eager for battle, Arc's reckless earth magic collapses the tunnel, separating him and Eevin from Ariane and Chiyome. Underground, Arc and Eevin discover slaves forced to mine valuable runestones, revealing the continent-wide kidnapping operation is being run by Yakof. Following the injured Bart to a secret lab, they reunite with Ariane and Chiyome. There, they discover Yakof turning dead slaves into undead so they continue working, mining runestone for his master, Lord Thanatos. Ariane purifies the undead while Arc decides to execute Yakof. Yakof summons a titanic golem containing Leeza's skeleton, who he betrayed to steal her family's runestone mine. After Chiyome evacuates the slaves, Arc ignites the runestones, triggering a massive explosion. The Leeza-golem survives but stops obeying Yakof and crushes him to death. Arc and Ariane question whether the golem simply collapsed after running out of magic, or whether Leeza's spirit got revenge on Yakof. Unfazed, Thanatos shifts his focus to other projects. Ariane privately asks Eevin about Arc as a romantic partner. Eevin claims to have no opinion yet, though suspecting Arc was holding back considerably during her earlier duel with him, she secretly resolves to test Arc further. Arc, Ariane, and Chiyome resume their quest to find the curse-breaking pool.
18	6	"The Nature of This World Floats Upon the Dragon Lord's Spring"; Transliteration: "Ryuō no Izumi ni Ukabu wa Konyo no Ri" (Japanese: 龍王の泉に浮かぶは異世界(このよ)の理)	Ingai Sai	Fūta Takei	Hiroaki Yoshikawa	August 10, 2026
Ariane leads the group to a hidden valley housing the pool at the base of the titanic Lord Crown tree. Arc notices a Torii gate built by Hanzo the First, but accidentally angers the Dragon Lord Villiers Fim. Ponta prevents them fighting, and Villiers Fim grants access to the pool while allowing the members of Chiyome's clan Arc freed from slavery to build a new Hidden Village in the forest. Arc bathes in the pool while Ariane and Chiyome wonder what he will look like. Arc briefly regains flesh, but passes out with severe chest pains and reverts to a skeleton. Arc remains unresponsive for weeks as Chiyome's people build their village. Ariane learns from Chiyome that a princess's kiss might break Arc's slumber. Just as an embarrassed Ariane attempts to kiss him, Arc wakes up, prompting her to set him on fire out of embarrassment. Arc discovers the pool no longer works even temporarily. Villiers Fim deduces Arc is an otherworldly soul inhabiting a skeleton body while his original body remains in Japan, and the pool's attempt to fuse the two overwhelmed him. Elsewhere, Danka is attacked by an assassin and falls into the ocean. Chiyome and Goemon introduce Arc to a clan elder.
19	7	"The Spirit of Chivalry Blooms at the Shinobi Village"; Transliteration: "Shinobi Sato ni Saku wa, Kan Tamashī" (Japanese: 忍び里に咲くは、漢魂！)	Kazuo Nogami	Toshizō Nemoto	Susumu Nishizawa	August 17, 2026
Village Elder Hanzo the 22nd invites Arc and Ariane to celebrate finishing building their village. Exploring the town, Arc is thrilled to discover hidden ninja technology and meets Tsubone, one of the Six Named Ninja, named for Hatsume no Tsubone. After learning the names of the rest; Saizo, Kotaro, and Sasuke, after Kirigakure Saizō, Fūma Kotarō and Sarutobi Sasuke, Arc deduces the first Hanzo really was a reincarnation from modern Japan. Meanwhile, Tsubone teases Ariane with oddly specific romance novels featuring skeleton knights and elves. The festivities begin with a traditional tug-of-war. Arc faces the reigning champion, Goemon, but their strength is so evenly matched the rope snaps, prompting Hanzo to declare a draw. Ariane becomes intoxicated, luckily passing out before she can set Arc on fire. Uncertain of his next move knowing the pool did not work, Ariane asks to continue traveling together with Arc. Their conversation is interrupted by a message from Glenys, who grants Arc the surname Lalatoya to mark his alliance with the elves. She also reveals that Danka survived an attack by a shadowy assassin. Chiyome realizes the attacker's description matches Sasuke, who, unbeknownst to them, has been sent by the Pope to assist in a criminal conspiracy.
20	8	"The Sea Hears the Tale of the Tragic Kunoichi's Past"; Transliteration: "Shiosai yo Kike, Kanashiki Kunoichi no Omoi" (Japanese: 潮騒よ聞け、哀しきくノ一の想い)	Madoka Yaguchi	Shin Yoshida	Minoru Ōhara	August 24, 2026
Arc and his friends arrive at Landfrea Port to cross the sea and reach the southern continent. Arc is intrigued all ships that sail that way require dragon scale armour to repel giant krakens. Arc finds the ocean actually makes him nervous, since if he fell in his armour would sink him to the bottom. Chiyome is anxious to see Sasuke, since if he did attack Danka then he is risking war between the elves and the Hidden Village. Tsubone explains she and Sasuke found Chiyome as a child after her village was destroyed by bandits. Blaming herself for her mother's death, Chiyome insisted on training as a warrior. Over time, Sasuke was promoted to the Six Ninja and came to view Chiyome as a sister. Eventually, Chiyome also became a Six Ninja. A kraken attacks the ship but Arc and Chiyome compete to cut off its tentacles before it flees. They arrive in Primas port in Fobnach Kingdom, ruled by the Beastmen. Ariane checks on Danka in the hospital while Arc and Chiyome sell the roasted squid meat for extra cash. Ariane discovers Danka already left the city days ago. Elsewhere, Sasuke flees across a forest with a small, injured creature crying in a sack.
21	9	"Reunited to the Sound of a Dark Beast's Howl"; Transliteration: "Saikai wa Kuroki Kemono no Hōkō to Tomoni" (Japanese: 再会は黒き獣の咆哮と共に)	Tsutomu Murakami	Yasuyuki Suzuki	Shinji Ishihira	August 31, 2026
Discovering Danka was heading for Tajiento village, Ariane seeks to hire Driorgle birds to fly them, but as none are available Arc wrestles a grumpy Driftpus dragon into submission. The group races toward Tajiento, though Ariane suffers severe motion sickness. During the night, the Tiger Clan and their Chief Ayn confront them for stealing their clan's missing Driftpus, but Danka intervenes to prevent bloodshed. Danka reveals that elves and beastmen have also been going missing on this continent, and are likely held in Tajiento. As Danka's assailant was undead, Chiyome holds out hope it was not Sasuke. When normally docile Giamiants attack Tiger clan villages, Arc slays them. Ponta later leads Arc to the bag Sasuke planted near the villages, containing a now dead Giamiant baby and revealing the Giamiants were provoked into attacking. Meanwhile, Sekt gathers intelligence for Yuriarna on the Holy Revlon Empire, which may have allied with the Holy Hilk Kingdom and its rumoured monster, "The Grim Reaper." Elsewhere, a priest named Cardinal Charros gorges himself on meat heavily implied to be human flesh. Danka's attacker suddenly appears. Ariane confirms the man is definitely undead, while Chiyome arrives and tearfully discovers the attacker is indeed Sasuke.
22	10	"The Cold-Blooded Code! Hunting a Brother With Tears in Her Eyes"; Transliteration: "Hijō no Okite! Namida o Dakite Ani o Ou" (Japanese: 非情の掟！ 涙を抱きて義兄(あに)を追う)	Ingai Sai	Toshizō Nemoto	Shinji Ishihira	September 7, 2026
Enraged by their dead child, the Giamiants attack, allowing Sasuke to escape. Chiyome recklessly chases him and gets stabbed in the stomach, but Arc heals her while Sasuke summons skeletons and vanishes. Back at the Tiger village, Arc deduces Sasuke used an artifact similar to those from Yakof and Udolan. Since Sasuke reacts and follows instructions, Arc suggests he is an advanced undead created through magical experimentation. Chiyome accepts that Sasuke is dead and accepts her duty to destroy his body. From Sasuke's attack pattern, Arc predicts his next target is Tajiento, the southern continent's only all-human settlement managed by the Revlon Empire. Meanwhile, Ariane notices Arc's Driftpus, Shiden, has become loyally attached to him like a pet dog. Charros is warned by Palurumo to stop abusing his power the power given him by Thanatos. Following another dead infant's scent, the Giamiants attack Tajiento alongside Sasuke's skeletons. Arc arrives with the Tiger clan to defend the city. They locate Sasuke with Palurumo, who admits to turning Sasuke undead. Tsubone magically charms the arrogant Palurumo into revealing he is one of the Hilk Church's Seven Cardinals, a faction preaching human superiority over all other races.
23	11	"Blood Duel! Death Amidst the Collapsing City"; Transliteration: "Chi Dou! Hōkai no Machi ni Shisu" (Japanese: 血闘！ 崩壊の街に死す)	Yukio Takahashi	Toshizō Nemoto	Minoru Ōhara	September 14, 2026
Despite resisting Tsubone's manipulation, Paluromo arrogantly reveals the Hilk church's sinister plot: they orchestrated the kidnappings all over the world to forge an undead army. Sasuke, who had attempted to free the church's slaves, was murdered by Thanatos and resurrected to command the army. The church intended to destroy Tajiento with undead and giamiants while remaining blameless themselves, then swoop in afterward to recruit the desperate survivors as new followers of the church. As Paluromo vanishes, Chiyome confronts the undead Sasuke while the others battle the undead. During their duel, Chiyome realizes the reanimated Sasuke lacks his former martial arts and ninjutsu prowess. Capitalizing on this, she outsmarts him using a water clone and fatally stabs him. Freed briefly from the reanimation spell, Sasuke regains his senses, proudly praising Chiyome for surpassing him. Grateful to be laid to rest by family, he peacefully disintegrates, causing the masterless undead army to stop their assault. Meanwhile, Paluromo scapegoats Charros for the failed invasion of Tajiento. Terrified of Thanatos's impending wrath, Charros transforms into a grotesque, multi-mouthed monster and begins devouring helpless citizens in a desperate frenzy. Arc steps forward, preparing to face Charros alone.
24	12	"Divine Punishment! The Skeleton Metes Out Justice That Obliterates Evil!"; Transliteration: "Appare! Aku o Kechirasu Gaikotsu Sabaki!" (Japanese: 天晴！ 悪を蹴散らす骸骨裁き！)	Madoka Yaguchi	Toshizō Nemoto	Katsumi Ono	September 21, 2026
To fuel his healing, Charros devours citizens, soldiers, undead, and giamiants, resisting Arc's lightning and Ariane's flames. Captured by Charros's fleshy mouths, Arc hears Charros' victims' tormented voices. Enraged, he summons the Master Beast Aion, gaining temporary invulnerability and infinite mana. Arc unleashes a rapid succession of Sacred Skills—Seal, Flame Viper, Holy Sword, and Lightning Cross Advent, overwhelming Charros's regeneration, destroying him, and freeing the trapped souls. Days later, Sekt informs Yuriarna that Tajiento was saved by a silver-armoured giant, whom she suspects is her saviour angel. Meanwhile, Emperor Domitanius exploits the Hilk Church's chaos to advance his own plans. In the Hidden Village, Ariane tries to confess something to Arc but is repeatedly interrupted: first by a message confirming freed elf and beastmen slaves reached safety, then by her parents announcing the Drant elf village was attacked by undead. Arc agrees to help but worries Ariane cannot join him on the new mission as she is a Maple village citizen and Arc a Lalatoyan citizen. Glenys reveals Ariane transferred her citizenship to Lalatoya to stay with Arc. Tsubone teasingly notes sharing the Lalatoya surname makes them sound married. Thanatos is intrigued by descriptions of Arc and removes his mask, revealing he is also a skeleton.

== Reception ==
=== Previews ===
The anime adaptation's first episode received generally negative reviews from Anime News Network's staff during the Spring 2022 season previews. Caitlin Moore found its "mishmash of isekai clichés" dull and "pretty inoffensive" and was immediately put off by the graphic rape scene in the beginning and Arc's comical antics during and after said scene, calling it "a bad narrative choice all around, and deserves to be criticized for that in addition to being crass." James Beckett found the sexual assault opening "lascivious and needlessly cruel" and felt that Arc comes across as a "genuine sociopath" when going through violent scenarios. Nicholas Dupree also criticized the rape sequence as "a lazy, shameless bit of shock-jock writing" that felt out of place and ruins Arc's introduction by seeing his perspective of said sequence and feels like a bad joke afterwards. Rebecca Silverman found the "opening salvo" as a cheap ploy to grab viewers' attention and called the rest of the episode "shockingly bland", concluding that "a combination of insipid and offensive doesn't leave this with a whole lot to recommend it." Conversely, Richard Eisenbeis was positive towards Arc's personality and felt the bandit scene gave him some "character development", concluding that: "All in all, despite the rough start, I really enjoyed this episode and can't wait to see where things go from here as he inevitably forms a party and answers the call to adventure."

=== Series ===
Stig Høgset, writing for THEM Anime Reviews, criticized the moral alignment and violent aspects of the fantasy world and some "pretty cheap-looking segments" throughout the episodes, but gave praise to Arc's enthusiastic character and both Ariane and Chiyome's backstories making them "more fleshed-out characters" outside of their interactions with Arc, concluding that: "It's not a terribly complicated show, so it works more like a mid-level popcorn entertainment version of deeper or grimmer shows like Re:Zero or Overlord, but like I once said about other shows; sometimes, you just want to relax and have some fun. Skeleton Knight in Another World's got your back there."

== See also ==
- Mercedes and the Waning Moon, another light novel series with the same illustrator
- Tensei Shita Kūkan Mahōtsukai wa Shōtai Kakushite Medachitai!, another light novel series with the same illustrator
- The Wrong Way to Use Healing Magic, another light novel series with the same illustrator
