= Reincarnated in a Mafia Dating Sim =

Japanese light novel series

- First light novel volume cover

悪党一家の愛娘、転生先も乙女ゲームの極道令嬢でした。～最上級ランクの悪役さま、その溺愛は不要です！～ (Akutō Ikka no Manamusume, Tensei-saki mo Otome Geimu no Gokudō Reijō Deshita. Saijōkyū Ranku no Akuyaku-sama, Sono Dekiai wa Fuyō Desu!)
- Genre: Isekai, romance
- Novel series
- Written by: Touko Amekawa
- Published by: Shōsetsuka ni Narō
- Original run: April 1, 2022 – present
- Light novel
- Written by: Touko Amekawa
- Illustrated by: Meiji Anno (vols. 1-3); LINO (vols. 4-)
- Published by: TO Books
- English publisher: NA: Tokyopop
- Imprint: TO Bunko
- Original run: May 10, 2023 – present
- Volumes: 6
- Manga
- Written by: Touko Amekawa
- Illustrated by: Sora Gōto
- Published by: TO Books
- English publisher: NA: Tokyopop
- Imprint: Corona Comics
- Magazine: Corona EX
- Original run: January 19, 2023 – present
- Volumes: 6
- Anime television series
- icon

Reincarnated in a Mafia Dating Sim: A Yakuza Heiress Becomes the Top-Ranked Villain's Romantic Target! (Japanese: 悪党一家の愛娘、転生先も乙女ゲームの極道令嬢でした。～最上級ランクの悪役さま、その溺愛は不要です！～, Hepburn: Akutō Ikka no Manamusume, Tensei-saki mo Otome Geimu no Gokudō Reijō Deshita. Saijōkyū Ranku no Akuyaku-sama, Sono Dekiai wa Fuyō Desu) is a Japanese light novel series written by Touko Amekawa and illustrated by Meiji Anno. It originally began serialization on Shōsetsuka ni Narō in April 2022. It was later acquired by TO Books who began publishing it under their TO Bunko imprint in May 2023. A manga adaptation illustrated by Sora Gōto began serialization on the Corona EX manga website in January 2023. An anime television series adaptation has been announced.

== Premise ==
Francesca Calvino is the teenage daughter of a powerful mafia family, and she has memories of her previous life as a Japanese teenager. As she was the granddaughter of a yakuza boss in this previous life, she was unable to make friends, and had been playing a fantasy otome game with Francesca as its protagonist. Remembering the game's plot, Francesca intends to alter the storyline so she can lead a peaceful life outside of the criminal underworld. However, her efforts to end the engagement with her fiancé Leonardo Aldini, a cruel and manipulative boy who is the game's main villain, only make him more interested in her.

== Characters ==
Francesca (フランチェスカ, Furanchesuka)
Voiced by: Haruka Tomatsu (drama CD)
Leonardo (レオナルド, Reonarudo)
Voiced by: Yuma Uchida (drama CD)
Graziano (グラツィアーノ, Guratsuiāno)
Voiced by: Takeo Ōtsuka (drama CD)
Ewald (エヴァルト, Evuaruto)
Voiced by: Daisuke Namikawa (drama CD)
Ricardo (リカルド, Rikarudo)
Voiced by: Yūichirō Umehara (drama CD)
David (ダヴィ―ド, Davuido)
Voiced by: Yoshitsugu Matsuoka (drama CD)
Luca (ルカ, Ruka)
Voiced by: Rie Kugimiya (drama CD)

== Media ==
=== Light novel ===
Written by Touko Amekawa, Reincarnated in a Mafia Dating Sim began serialization on Shōsetsuka ni Narō on April 1, 2022. It was later acquired by TO Books who began publishing it with illustrations by Meiji Anno and character designs by Sora Gōto under their TO Bunko light novel imprint on May 10, 2023. Later volumes feature illustrations from LINO. Six volumes have been released as of August 1, 2026. The light novel is also licensed for English publication by Tokyopop.

No.	Original release date	Original ISBN	English release date	English ISBN
1	May 10, 2023	978-4-86699-841-1	February 9, 2027	978-1-42788-800-6
2	September 9, 2023	978-4-86699-939-5	—	—
3	August 1, 2024	978-4-86794-268-0	—	—
4	August 1, 2025	978-4-86794-649-7	—	—
5	December 1, 2025	978-4-86794-799-9	—	—
6	August 1, 2026	978-4-86854-085-4	—	—

=== Manga ===
A manga adaptation illustrated by Sora Gōto began serialization on TO Books' Corona EX website on January 19, 2023. The manga's chapters have been compiled into six tankōbon volumes as of August 2026. The manga is licensed for English publication by Tokyopop.

No.	Original release date	Original ISBN	North American release date	North American ISBN
1	May 15, 2023	978-4-86699-845-9	August 12, 2025	978-1-4278-8266-0
Chapters 1–4; Bonus stories; "Whispering Empty Words of Love"
2	January 15, 2024	978-4-86794-061-7	September 2, 2025	978-1-4278-8271-4
Chapters 5–11; Bonus stories; "A Special Girl"
3	August 1, 2024	978-4-86794-263-5	February 3, 2026	978-1-4278-8578-4
Chapters 12–18; Recording the Drama CD; "A Sweet Moment That Remains Forever"
4	March 1, 2025	978-4-86794-483-7	April 7, 2026	978-1-4278-8579-1
Chapters 19–24; Bonus stories; "For My Unwavering Friendship"
5	December 1, 2025	978-4-86794-783-8	December 8, 2026	978-1-4278-9192-1
6	August 1, 2026	978-4-86854-075-5	—	—

=== Drama CD ===
A drama CD adaptation was released on August 1, 2024, coinciding with the release of the third light novel volume. It featured performances from Haruka Tomatsu, Yuma Uchida, Takeo Ōtsuka, Daisuke Namikawa, Minami Kurisaka, and Shoya Ishige.

A second drama CD with an original story by Amekawa was released on December 1, 2025, coinciding with the release of the fifth light novel volume. It featured the performances from the cast of the first drama CD who reprised their roles along with Yūichirō Umehara, Yoshitsugu Matsuoka, and Rie Kugimiya.

=== Anime ===
An anime adaptation was announced on November 27, 2025. It was later revealed to be a television series.

== Reception ==
By November 2025, the series had over 350,000 copies in circulation.

In a review for Anime News Network, Rebecca Silverman graded the first two volumes of the manga adaptation a "B". She praised the characters and twists on the genre, but was critical of the pacing and the school uniforms being anachronistic.

== See also ==
- 7th Time Loop, another light novel series with the same writer
- From Bumbling Prodigy to Villainess: Will the Duke's Love Go Unnoticed?, another light novel series whose manga adaptation shares the same illustrator
