= An Observation Log of My Fiancée Who Calls Herself a Villainess =

Japanese light novel series

- First light novel volume cover

自称悪役令嬢な婚約者の観察記録。 (Jishō Akuyaku Reijō na Konyakusha no Kansatsu Kiroku)
- Genre: Fantasy; Romance
- Novel series
- Written by: Shiki
- Published by: Shōsetsuka ni Narō; (2016–2017); AlphaPolis; (2019–2024)
- Original run: 2016 – 2024
- Light novel

Observation Records of My Fiancée: The Misadventures of a Self-Proclaimed Villainess
- Written by: Shiki
- Illustrated by: Wan Hachipisu
- Published by: AlphaPolis
- English publisher: NA: Hanashi Media
- Imprint: Regina Books
- Original run: May 4, 2017 – September 5, 2017
- Volumes: 2
- Manga
- Written by: Shiki
- Illustrated by: Natsume Hasumi
- Published by: AlphaPolis
- English publisher: Alpha Manga
- Imprint: Regina Comics
- Magazine: Regina
- Original run: May 7, 2018 – August 6, 2021
- Volumes: 6
- Light novel

Observation Records of My Wife: The Misadventures of a Self-Proclaimed Villainess
- Written by: Shiki
- Illustrated by: Wan Hachipisu
- Published by: AlphaPolis
- English publisher: NA: Hanashi Media
- Imprint: Regina Books
- Original run: April 5, 2022 – present
- Volumes: 5
- Manga

An Observation Log of My Wife Who Calls Herself a Villainess
- Written by: Shiki
- Illustrated by: Natsume Hasumi
- Published by: AlphaPolis
- English publisher: Alpha Manga
- Imprint: Regina Comics
- Magazine: Regina
- Original run: March 29, 2022 – present
- Volumes: 4
- Anime television series
- Directed by: Junichi Yamamoto
- Written by: Akiko Inoue
- Music by: Yuki Hayashi; Luke Standridge; Asa Taylor
- Studio: Ashi Productions
- Licensed by: Crunchyroll
- Original network: Tokyo MX, BS11, Sun TV
- Original run: April 3, 2026 – June 19, 2026
- Episodes: 12
- icon

An Observation Log of My Fiancée Who Calls Herself a Villainess (Japanese: 自称悪役令嬢な婚約者の観察記録。, Hepburn: Jishō Akuyaku Reijō na Konyakusha no Kansatsu Kiroku) is a Japanese light novel series written by Shiki and illustrated by Wan Hachipisu. The series was originally posted as a web novel on the Shōsetsuka ni Narō website, before Shiki removed it in March 2017. AlphaPolis later published it as a light novel under their Regina Books imprint, releasing two volumes from May to September 2017. A manga adaptation illustrated by Natsume Hasumi was serialized on AlphaPolis' Regina manga website from May 2018 to August 2021 and was compiled in six volumes. A sequel series by Shiki and Hachipisu, titled An Observation Log of My Wife Who Calls Herself a Villainess (自称悪役令嬢な妻の観察記録。, Jishō Akuyaku Reijō na Tsuma no Kansatsu Kiroku), began publication under the same imprint in April 2022, with a manga adaptation by Hasumi starting on the same website in March 2022. An anime television series adaptation produced by Ashi Productions aired from April to June 2026.

== Premise ==
Cecil, who is numb to emotions, becomes interested in his fiancée, Tia, whom claims to be a reincarnated and reborn as the villainess of an otome game. Thinking she is simply crazy at first, Cecil plays along; until events that Tia foretold begin happening as she said. Because of what appears to be psychic power, Cecil decides to take more interest in her and listen to Tia's ramblings.

== Characters ==
Cecil Glo Alphasta (セシル・グロー・アルファスタ, Seshiru Gurō Arufasuta)
Voiced by: Yūsuke Kobayashi (Japanese); Blake McNamara, Donna Xia (child) (English)
First prince, who suffers from a hereditary mental disorder that leaves him somewhat a psychopath; it's not consistent with each generation, but randomly manifests via atavism. His father told him the only way to feel love is to find the right person, whom can interest him and bring joy; ironically enough, it turns out to be Tia, instead of the heroine, due her bizarre behavior. He was the popular love interest of the otome game, which is why Tia keeps trying to make herself look less appealing to him and get their engagement annulled; though Cecil finds her new ideas interesting and chooses to stick with her. The story is shown from his point of view.
Tia's reason for continuing the role of a villainess that the original Bertia held is because in the original otome game, Heronia was the heroine who could choose between Cecil or his aides which include Courtgain, Charles, Nert, or Bard (or in one special case, all five of them). In Cecil's route, he finds happiness being with Heronia. By contrast, any route that wasn't Cecil's ended with the country going to war or suffering the aftereffects of war and Cecil being assassinated (Courtgain's route), go missing (Charles route), run away (Shawn's route), be a recluse (Nert's route), or become a warmonger (Bard's route). She believes the country could be at peace and Cecil would find happiness only if he paired up with Heronia. However, as a result, she is stubborn and is at times innocently insensitive to Cecil's feelings towards her, especially as he is disgusted and wants nothing to do with the current Heronia, who is notably nothing like the kind hardworking girl of the original otome game (as the current Heronia is also a reincarnator from Bertia's original world).
Through Bertia's influence, while he fundamentally does not change as a person, he is kinder and much more considerate of those around him and takes his duties as crown prince seriously. He also manages to care about his family and remain close friends with all of his aides and does care about their happiness as well. He also deeply loves Bertia and while he worries about her impulsive actions, he resolves himself to let her do as she pleases while ensuring no one will harm her with the support of both their friends and family because her antics never cease to amuse him and bring color to his previously dull life.
Bertia Ibil Noches (バーティア・イビル・ノーチェス, Bātia Ibiru Nochesu) / Tia
Voiced by: Miyu Tomita (Japanese); Kelly Greenshield (English)
A girl reborn as the villainess of her favorite otome game. A clumsy, outgoing, impulsive, kind, and energetic girl who claims to be a villainess, which interests Cecil. Her nickname is Tia. Not much is known of her previous life, though she mentions she was obsessed with the original otome game and was especially fond of the character Cecil, which carries over into her current life as Bertia. However, even though she falls for Cecil as a person, she forces herself to be a villainess as she believes only Heronia, the original heroine of the game, can bring happiness to Cecil.
As part of her efforts to follow the original plot of the otome game and set up Cecil with Heronia, she helps Cecil's friends/aides (who were also capture target in the otome game Bertia played) with their relationships with their respective love interests. Tia also tried to get her father to be the villain he was by giving him a manual on upcoming events; however, he instead took the good path and reported intel to Cecil. Despite her best efforts to be a villainess, her kindness and clumsiness instead cause her to be seen as endearing, causing many to become fans of her. Her kind outgoing straightforward nature makes her so popular that she has a fan club that manages to garner fans outside the country.
Despite her obliviousness, Tia does have a natural talent for organizing information in books; which comes in handy for Cecil, who corrects future issues behind her back with said information. This talent later allows her to write popular tour guides and, after her marriage, wedding magazines that are so popular that she gets asked to organize weddings for the royalty of other countries.
Unknown to Tia, she has contracted a spirit of darkness, who she named "Kuro"; due to the fact magic wasn't in the original game. Doubling her ignorance is that her spirit only appears in the form of a child due to Tia never staying awake long at night; dark spirits are weak during the day, thus Tia spending most of her time being active during the day indirectly prevents her spirit from gathering power in the night.
Heronia Inderon (ヒロー二ア・インデロン, Hirōnia Inderon)
Voiced by: Yume Miyamoto (Japanese); Francine Gonzalez (English)
The "heroine" of the game. While the original Heronia of the otome game was a kind soul and hard worker, the current Heronia is selfish and a fellow reincarnator who feels entitled to Cecil's and the other capture target's affections. She enacts the routes from the original game and remains delusional, not recognizing that the world and the people are real and the world has changed from the otome game. As a result, she frequently antagonizes Bertia and bothers Cecil and the other "capture targets"/love interests of the original game. Her only true friend is Pii-chan, the light spirit who takes the form of a bird and helps Heronia by using its ability to brainwash others. She is forced to realize the error of her ways when Pii-chan dies in its attempt to help Heronia. After her actions are exposed and she is forced to become a nun and go to a monastery, she chooses a dangerous one in the north as there is hope that she can resurrect Pii-chan, her one and only friend, if she goes there.
Shawn Turquoin Alphasta (ショーン・ターコイン・アルファスタ, Shōn Tākoin Arufasuta)
Voiced by: Ayumu Murase
Cecil's younger brother. Unlike Cecil, he did not inherit the mental disorder that is passed in the royal family and was spoiled as a child. As a result, he is somewhat childish and blunt but remains a kind gentle soul to the point his smile is compared to an angel's, while his brother's smile is compared to a fallen angel's. He loves sweets and is close to Cecil. He understands he is not fit to be king and wholeheartedly supports Cecil as the future king and looks up to him. Although he is engaged to Joanna, he was at first fearful of her because she seemed so perfect. However, once he saw she wasn't perfect after failing to make sweets, he grew to see her as a normal girl and developed a desire to protect her and be a good partner.
Joanna Curtswarren (ジョアンナ・ケルツウォーレン, Joanna Kerutsuwōren)
Voiced by: Ayaka Ōhashi
A close friend of Bertia ever since Bertia helped defend her from a suitor who refused to leave her alone. She is the president of Bertia's fan club and ensures her safety. She was once engaged to Cecil but was too similar to him and they both mutually gave up on the engagement as a result. She dislikes Cecil despite being similar as a "black-hearted schemer" but both deeply care for Bertia. She also deeply loves her fiancé Shawn and fawns over both him and Bertia.
Nelt Krum (ネルト・クラム, Neruto Kuramu)
Voiced by: Shun Horie
A friend of Cecil's and one of the capture targets in the original otome game. He is very intelligent but shy and is engaged to his childhood friend Silica. While he was at first annoyed by her strict behavior, he grows to appreciate her.
Silica Lunea (シーリカ・ルネア, Shīrika Runea)
Voiced by: Iori Saeki
A friend of Bertia's who has skills in cooking and a motherly personality. She is the fiancé of her childhood friend Nelt, whom she often looks after but cares for deeply.
Charles Raonel (チャールズ・ラオネル, Chāruzu Raoneru)
Voiced by: Yusuke Shirai
A friend of Cecil and one of the capture targets in the original otome game. He acts easygoing and tends to flirt with women, but in reality he is in love with Anne but restrains himself because she is engaged to his older brother and marrying him would grant Anne a higher status than marrying Charles, who is the second born. As a result, he flirts with other women in the hopes of moving on from Anne. With Bertia's interference, he confesses his love and enters a relationship with Anne. He devotes himself into becoming Cecil's personal aide so he can rise in rank and be worthy of Anne. He also gives up his womanizing ways as a result.
Anne Kogares (アンネ・コガーレス, Anne Kogāresu)
Voiced by: Aya Uchida
A friend of Bertia's who is the most ladylike. While she was in a political engagement with Charles' brother who is a well known playboy, she later chooses Charles after hearing his heartfelt confession of love (with Bertia's intervention) despite his initial lower status. She chooses to get into politics in order to help support Charles in his future as Cecil's personal aide.
Vald Norgins (バルド・ノーキンス, Barudo Nōkinsu)
Voiced by: Hidenori Takahashi
An athletic but not too intelligent friend of Cecil's. He is friendly and straightforward but lacks tact. He is engaged to Cynthia who shares similar athletic interests such as horseback riding and martial arts.
Cynthia Linnerith (シンシア・ソーネリス, Shinshia Sōnerisu)
Voiced by: M.A.O
A friend of Bertia's and the fiancé of Vald. She shares his love of horseback riding and martial arts and loves competing wih him. However she is far more socially aware than Vald and helps keep him in line.
Zeno (ゼノ)
Voiced by: Atsushi Tamaru (Japanese); Tom Aglio (English)
Cecil's contracted spirit who poses as his butler. He shares a telepathic link with Cecil and despite his loyalty to Cecil, Zeno tends to snark at him. His main elements are water and wind but because he has the blood of the spirit king, he can control all elements outside of his main ones at a decent level. At the end of the series, he marries Kuro and she is pregnant with his child.
Courtgain Deres Mardan (クールガン・デレス・マーダン, Kūrugan de Resu Mādan)
Voiced by: Seiichiro Yamashita
A friend of Cecil's and one of the capture targets in the original otome game. In the original otome game, he was adopted into Bertia's family since Bertia's mom died without leaving a male heir and Bertia's father forced Courtgain to help him commit horrible deeds. Because Bertia's mom is alive and gave birth to a son, Bertia tells Cecil about his existence to ensure the course of the world still follows the otome game. Cecil, intrigued by Courtgain's competence, convinces him to be adopted by a different noble family involved in dubious actions to act as a spy. He is cold to most except for Cecil (as a result of Cecil recognizing his abilities and helping him move in rank) and Bertia (who views him as a brother of sorts). Cecil sees him as a reliable ally who he can entrust both official work and shadier work. In the sequel, he becomes close to Bertia's maid Mirma.
Kuro (クロ)
Voiced by: Akari Kitō (Japanese); Gillian Lange (English)
Bertia's contracted spirit. As a spirit of darkness, she specializes in barriers and defense. She takes the appearance of a young child with fox ears and tails (although most people can't see the ears and tail) and is protective of Bertia. She does not speak but expresses herself through her actions. She is not fond of Cecil but puts up with him for Bertia's sake. Her favorite food is inarizushi. She marries Zeno and is pregnant with his child at the end of the series.

== Media ==
=== Light novel ===
Written by Shiki, An Observation Log of My Fiancée Who Calls Herself a Villainess was originally published on the Shōsetsuka ni Narō website until Shiki removed it on March 27, 2017. AlphaPolis later published two volumes with illustrations by Wan Hachipisu under their Regina Books light novel imprint from May 4 to September 5, 2017. The series is licensed digital-only in English by Hanashi Media under the title Observation Records of My Fiancée: The Misadventures of a Self-Proclaimed Villainess.

A sequel series, titled An Observation Log of My Wife Who Calls Herself a Villainess (自称悪役令嬢な妻の観察記録。, Jishō Akuyaku Reijō na Tsuma no Kansatsu Kiroku), began publication under the same imprint on April 5, 2022. Five volumes have been released as of June 5, 2025. The sequel is also licensed by digital-only by Hanashi Media under the title Observation Records of My Wife: The Misadventures of a Self-Proclaimed Villainess.

==== Observation Records of My Fiancée: The Misadventures of a Self-Proclaimed Villainess ====
No.	Original release date	Original ISBN	North American release date	North American ISBN
1	May 4, 2017	978-4-434-23231-2	July 30, 2024	978-1-961-78815-2
2	September 5, 2017	978-4-434-23697-6	February 28, 2025	978-1-961-78826-8

==== Observation Records of My Wife: The Misadventures of a Self-Proclaimed Villainess ====
No.	Original release date	Original ISBN	English release date	English ISBN
1	April 5, 2022	978-4-434-30111-7	May 30, 2025	978-1-961-78828-2
2	October 5, 2022	978-4-434-30897-0	January 29, 2026	978-1-961-78843-5
3	May 5, 2023	978-4-434-31941-9	April 30, 2026	978-1-961-78852-7
4	May 5, 2024	978-4-434-33502-0	July 30, 2026	978-1-961788-73-2
5	June 5, 2025	978-4-434-35815-9	October 30, 2026	978-1-961-78889-3
6	June 5, 2026	978-4-434-37515-6		

=== Manga ===
A manga adaptation illustrated by Natsume Hasumi was serialized on AlphaPolis' Regina manga website from May 7, 2018, to August 6, 2021. The manga's chapters were compiled into six tankōbon volumes released from December 31, 2018, to October 5, 2021. The manga is published in English on AlphaPolis' Alpha Manga manga service.

A manga adaptation of the sequel series, also illustrated by Hasumi, began serialization on the same website on March 29, 2022. The sequel manga's chapters have been compiled into four tankōbon volumes as of April 2026. The sequel manga is also published in English on AlphaPolis' Alpha Manga manga service.

==== An Observation Log of My Fiancée Who Calls Herself a Villainess ====
No.	Original release date	Original ISBN	North American release date	North American ISBN
1	December 31, 2018	978-4-434-25336-2	June 30, 2023	—
2	August 5, 2019	978-4-434-26101-5	June 30, 2023	—
3	February 5, 2020	978-4-434-26877-9	June 30, 2023	—
4	August 5, 2020	978-4-434-27636-1	December 22, 2023	—
5	March 5, 2021	978-4-434-26877-9	December 22, 2023	—
6	October 5, 2021	978-4-434-29415-0	December 22, 2023	—

==== An Observation Log of My Wife Who Calls Herself a Villainess ====
No.	Original release date	Original ISBN	North American release date	North American ISBN
1	November 5, 2022	978-4-434-31029-4	May 23, 2025	—
2	August 5, 2023	978-4-434-32329-4	May 23, 2025	—
3	June 5, 2025	978-4-434-35819-7	—	—
4	April 10, 2026	978-4-434-37523-1	—	—

=== Anime ===
An anime television series adaptation was announced on May 12, 2025. The series will be produced by Ashi Productions and directed by Junichi Yamamoto, with Akiko Inoue handling series composition and episode screenplays, Miki Matsumoto designing the characters, and Yuki Hayashi, Luke Standridge and Asa Taylor composing the music. It premiered on April 3 to June 19, 2026, on Tokyo MX and other networks. The opening theme song is "La Fleur", performed by Airi Miyakawa, and the ending theme song is "Magic", performed by RLOEVO. Crunchyroll is streaming the series.

==== Episodes ====
No.	Title	Directed by (Note: Production staff information is taken from the ending credits of each episode.)	Written by	Storyboard by	Original release date
1	"An Observation Log of Meeting a Self-Proclaimed Villainess"; Transliteration: "Jishō Akuyaku Reijō to Deai no Kansatsu Kiroku." (Japanese: 自称悪役令嬢と出会いの観察記録。)	Junichi Yamamoto	Akiko Inoue	Junichi Yamamoto	April 3, 2026
Prince Cecil, who usually has no emotions, meets his arranged fiancée Bertia who claims to be a villainess, which he actually finds amusing. Bertia explains in her previous life she played an otome game identical to her current life, so she knows the future. Cecil will fall in love with the heroine, and Bertia will become a villainess, all leading to Cecil's happy ending. Cecil notices something about her pet fox Kuro but keeps it to himself. He is surprised Bertia predicts an epidemic will kill many including her mother because the cure, the Luona leaf, is rare. A year later the epidemic does not appear, confusing Bertia. Cecil admits he identified the disease from her description, grew the Luona leaf himself and when the first patient appeared she was cured immediately, preventing the epidemic. Bertia is amazed as this never happened in the game. Cecil gives her a vial of universal medicine, revealing during his research he found a secret room in the royal library containing secret books, one of which was a recipe for the medicine, and he wants her kept safe. Bertia insists on sticking to the story so that Cecil finds his happiness, starting with turning her father, Marquis Noches, into an evil man.
2	"An Observation Log of the Self-proclaimed Villainess's Debut Into Society"; Transliteration: "Jishō Akuyaku Reijō to Shakaikai Debyū no Kansatsu Kiroku." (Japanese: 自称悪役令嬢と社交界デビューの観察記録。)	Takaaki Agatsuma	Akiko Inoue	Fumikazu Satō	April 10, 2026
Cecil notices Bertia is familiar with Viscount Consabtier. Bertia admits in the game it was Consabtier who corrupted her father, so she sought his advice. Cecil is furious as Consabtier is a known pedophile. Bertia is so shocked she names his conspirators; Count Conmorno and Baron Sagile. Cecil secretly convinces Noches to spy on the three men. Six months later, Cecil begins attending Halm academy and Bertia reveals her mother is pregnant. After baby Aneth is born, Bertia reveals to Cecil he did not exist in the game due to her mother's death. Now Aneth exists, Noches will not seek out distant relative Courtgain to adopt as heir. In turn, Courtgain will not attend Halm Academy to become one of Cecil's aide candidates or the heroine's capture targets, along with Lord Vald, Lord Charles, Lord Nelt and Second Prince Shawn. She fears the game might kill Aneth to ensure Courtgain takes his place in the story. Cecil solves the issue by having Courtgain adopted by another noble family and sent to Halm. Bertia reveals there is one scenario where the heroine seduces all five capture targets, but she never figured out how. Cecil reveals there are light spirits that can use hypnosis magic, such as his aide Zeno and her pet fox, darkness spirit Kuro. Bertia is shocked as she had no idea Kuro was a spirit she accidentally contracted to by naming her. Elsewhere, a lady named Heronia Inderon arrives in the city with her light spirit Pii.
3	"An Observation Log of a Self-proclaimed Villainess and Entering School"; Transliteration: "Jishō Akuyaku Reijō to Nyūgaku no Kansatsu Kiroku." (Japanese: 自称悪役令嬢と入学の観察記録。)	Shinnosuke Tonaka	Akiko Inoue	Shinnosuke Tonaka	April 17, 2026
Bertia enrols at Halm where Cecil and Courtgain are already members of the student council with Charles, Vald, Nelt and Shawn. Joanna, Cecil's cousin, becomes one of Bertia's friends, along with Silica, Cynthia and Anne. Bertia insists they are her evil minions. Bertia determines Cecil and the potential capture targets must have met Heronia by now. Cecil admits they have, but claims he found Heronia irritating and reported her as suspicious to the teachers. Bertia is stunned the heroine's first meeting with the capture targets is ruined. As Joanna is a schemer like himself, Cecil convinces her to help protect Bertia. Joanna reveals there are several students jealous of Bertia, and Heronia is one of them. With Joanna dealing with the human dangers, Cecil is confident Kuro can protect Bertia from Pii. Bertia tries to manufacture another meeting between Cecil and Heronia, but Cecil blatantly ignores Heronia to focus on Bertia. In this manner he successfully avoids Heronia several times. As Heronia is a mere Baron's daughter, trying to forcibly introduce herself to a prince is the height of bad manners, leading Cecil to actively dislike her. Also, Bertia's constant attempts to set him up with Heronia have begun to upset him.
4	"An Observation Log of a Self-proclaimed Villainess and Love's Cupid"; Transliteration: "Jishō Akuyaku Reijō to Koi no Kyūpiddo no Kansatsu Kiroku." (Japanese: 自称悪役令嬢と恋のキューピッドの観察記録。)	Daiki Nishimura	Akiko Inoue	Tomoya Takashima; Fukurō Kuma	April 24, 2026
Bertia decides to find the other capture targets girlfriends so they don't fall in love with Heronia and get in Cecil's way. First, she tries to get Vald together with Cynthia by teaching her to ride a horse, but since Cynthia never got sick in the pandemic Cecil prevented, she learned to ride years ago. They end up becoming close anyway by racing. Next, Bertia reveals Charles is actually in love with Anne, who is engaged to his older brother. Anne turns out to have feelings for Charles too, so he decides to become worthy of her by competing to become Cecil's aide. Bertia notices Shawn becomes nervous around Joanna, and Nelt is already childhood friends with Silica. Bertia suggests they make cookies for Shawn and Nelt, but Joanna is a terrible cook. Shawn turns out to like that Joanna isn't perfect all the time, since previously he was intimidated by her. Nelt shouts at Silica for always fussing over him. Nelt is amazed when Bertia reveals Silica only does so because she loves him. Nelt soon misses Silica's constant presence, so he apologises and asks Silica to stay with him forever. Bertia is glad she was successful as Cupid. Heronia is furious nothing is going right for her, and unknown to Heronia a mysterious woman is watching her.
5	"An Observation Log of a Self-proclaimed Villainess and First Feelings"; Transliteration: "Jishō Akuyaku Reijō to Hajimete no Kanjō no Kansatsu Kiroku." (Japanese: 自称悪役令嬢と初めての感情の観察記録。)	Kenya Ueno	Akiko Inoue	Mitsuko Ohya	May 1, 2026
Heronia starts a rumour Bertia is bullying her. Cecil notices everyone has earrings from Bertia while he doesn't. Bertia later gives him his earring, explaining they are charmed to protect everyone from Heronia's hypnosis, so she wasn't sure about giving one to Cecil since he is supposed to be with Heronia. Cecil takes the earring and Zeno casts a spell on Cecil and Bertia so their earrings can't be removed. The King orders Cecil to study in another country for 4 months. Cecil deduces that country is becoming corrupt in its trading, so he was sent to take advantage of their greed. His spies inform him Bertia has been framed for bullying. Cecil doubts Heronia is the culprit as the methods are unusually direct. Returning home, Cecil is frustrated Bertia is happy to seem like the villainess while her friends continue to expose Heronia for framing Bertia. Cecil deduces Heronia only has supporters because they are hypnotised, and despite his promise to Bertia not to interfere, he ends up threatening Heronia after catching her destroying Bertia's belongings. Shawn accuses Cecil of feeling lonely due to Bertia refusing his help, and letting Bertia struggle alone as childish revenge. Cecil is shocked, as he never considered he might feel lonely before. Word reaches him Bertia has fallen down stairs.
6	"An Observation Log of a Self-proclaimed Villainess and the Resolution of the Matter"; Transliteration: "Jishō Akuyaku Reijō to Jiken Kaiketsu no Kansatsu Kiroku." (Japanese: 自称悪役令嬢と事件解決の観察記録。)	Ryota Komatsu	Akiko Inoue	Romanov Higa	May 8, 2026
Bertia eventually admits she was pushed by a girl with pink hair like Heronia. Cecil experiences another unfamiliar emotion. He summons all Bertia's friends and reveals the perpetrator was not Heronia, but Ilynn Silbertz. A week later. Cecil publicly reveals Ilynn is obsessed with Fannil Rhodes, one of Bertia's fans, so she has been disguising herself as Heronia to bully Bertia. Cecil reveals he saw her disguised as Heronia destroying Bertia's belongings. Nelt reveals he sprayed a tracking chemical in Bertia's closet where her belongings were damaged, a chemical that is on Ilynn's shoes but not Heronia's. Heronia still blames Bertia and insists she must be with Cecil as she is the Maiden of Destiny. Cecil wonders if Bertia and Heronia know an important reason why he needs to marry Heronia. Bertia faints and Kuro reveals despite her apparent cheerfulness Bertia has been in constant stress for weeks. Two months later the Culture Festival begins. Joanna reveals to Cecil the authorities treated Ilynn pushing Bertia as attempted murder, so she is in prison awaiting trial. As part of the festival students vote for Best Couple. Bertia announces the results as Vald/Cynthia and Nelt/Silica in joint third place, Shawn/Joanna in second, and herself/Cecil in first, shocking her. Despite this, Bertia insists she must get Cecil together with Heronia by graduation.
7	"An Observation Log of a Self-proclaimed Villainess and Hatred"; Transliteration: "Jishō Akuyaku Reijō to Nikushimi no Kansatsu Kiroku." (Japanese: 自称悪役令嬢と憎しみの観察記録。)	Daiki Nishimura	Akiko Inoue	Fumikazu Satō	May 15, 2026
Bertia insists events are already pushing Cecil towards Heronia. One event being she has started to regain the weight she lost in childhood, which she insists is the story returning her characters original obesity. Cecil points out she has been eating sweets constantly since the festival. Bertia admits by avoiding him she hopes it will hurt less when he "leaves her speechless" by choosing Heronia. Courtgain reveals Heronia has been investigating Bertia's father Noches trying to prove he is a criminal. As the capture targets are tired of Heronia trying to break them up from their girlfriends they agree to help Cecil trick Heronia. To start, Courtgain tricks Heronia into believing Noches has started committing crimes. Cecil asks his father, the King, about the Maiden of Destiny, but he has not heard the title before. The King is glad Cecil appears to be in love with Bertia. Bertia gives Cecil her diary of all her villainess acts, in case he needs it as evidence. Cecil realises the diary is actually a record of Heronia's misdeeds Bertia blames herself for. Feeling unexpected anger towards Bertia, Cecil insists he will avoid whatever future Bertia claims will make him happy, by avoiding Heronia for the rest of his life. Bertia is heartbroken but still won't tell him why he must marry Heronia. Graduation arrives and Bertia believes the story is almost over, but Cecil refuses to let Bertia go.
8	"An Observation Log of a Self-proclaimed Villainess and Being Struck Speechless"; Transliteration: "Jishō Akuyaku Reijō to Gyafun no Kansatsu Kiroku." (Japanese: 自称悪役令嬢とギャフンの観察記録。)	Shinnosuke Tonaka	Akiko Inoue	Shinnosuke Tonaka	May 22, 2026
The King, Queen, and Noches attend graduation. Cecil formally passes his duties as Student President to the next President, Courtgain. Bertia prepares for Cecil to reveal her villainy, but instead Cecil presents her with an engagement ring, rendering her speechless. Heronia objects and accuses Bertia of bullying. However, Cecil prepared ahead of time and is able to provide alibis for Bertia during all the supposed incidents, as well as Heronia's lack of witnesses. Desperate, Heronia reveals Noches' crimes, but Cecil only affirms they were the crimes of Consabtier, Conmorno and Sagile, whom Noches worked undercover to expose, with the King's full knowledge. Heronia screams only she can make Cecil human. She reveals his lack of emotions will drive him to self-destruction as the Android Prince, and only by marrying her will he avoid this fate. Bertia assumes Cecil will now choose Heronia, but Cecil demands Heronia be taken away. Pii gets past Kuro and destroys Cecil's anti-hypnosis earring. Cecil finds himself taken to the past when he first met Bertia, yet finds he is entirely uninterested in her. He snaps back to himself, confused his memory suggests Bertia was boring. Feeling strange, he removes his glove and discovers a mechanical hand.
9	"An Observation Log of a Self-proclaimed Villainess and a Doll"; Transliteration: "Jishō Akuyaku Reijō to Ningyō no Kansatsu Kiroku." (Japanese: 自称悪役令嬢と人形の観察記録。)	Kenya Ueno	Akiko Inoue	Romanov Higa	May 29, 2026
Cecil remains in a dream world, remembering as a child he truly was emotionless. Despite knowing the boring Bertia is just a dream conjured by Pii, he feels his emotions being taken away, becoming more and more doll-like. He is forced to revisit past events as they happened in the game. The plague he prevented ravages the kingdom and kills Bertia's mother Mertia. Noches goes mad and becomes a criminal in his efforts to make Bertia Queen. Bertia remains obese and becomes cruel. Then Cecil meets Heronia, who awakens his emotions. Bertia begins bullying Heronia, but Cecil and Heronia eventually realise they love each other. Bertia's bullying is exposed, as are Noches' crimes, so Cecil ends his engagement to Bertia. Seeing Bertia cry, Cecil's memories of her suddenly come rushing back. The dream world shatters and he confronts Pii in the form of a young boy, who is desperate for Heronia to be happy. Cecil insists Heronia caused her own unhappiness by the selfish choices she made. Having expended all his power creating the dream world, Pii starts to disappear, meaning Heronia will be all alone. Cecil agrees to tell Heronia Pii always loved her. Cecil awakens in the real world to find Bertia in trouble again.
10	"An Observation Log of a Self-proclaimed Villainess and Cecil Glo Alphasta"; Transliteration: "Jishō Akuyaku Reijō to Seshiru Gurō Arufasuta no Kansatsu Kiroku." (Japanese: 自称悪役令嬢とセシル・グロー・アルファスタの観察記録。)	Harume Kosaka	Akiko Inoue	Romanov Higa	June 5, 2026
Bertia is threatening to become a nun so fate intervenes and Cecil wakes up and marries Heronia. Cecil assures her this is impossible. Bertia tells Cecil graduation was where Heronia was supposed to choose her partner then start down a partner-specific storyline. Heronia had tried to choose Cecil for the happiest possible ending since choosing anyone else would end with Cecil unhappy. Had she chosen Vald the kingdom would go to war, Cecil would become a tyrant and Vald forced to suffer with PTSD. Cecil understands why Bertia kept pushing him towards Heronia. Bertia reveals the other possibilities. Shawn; Cecil exiles himself and the kingdom barely survives war. Nelt; Cecil becomes a shut-in scientist and invents gunpowder to win the war with massive casualties. Charles; Cecil becomes a spy and help Charles win the war while Cecil is forgotten by history. Courtgain; Cecil is assassinated by enemy royalty, so Courtgain destroys them in a war. Bertia fears what will happen if Cecil does not marry the Maiden of Destiny. Cecil has a sudden realisation and kisses her, causing the Maiden of Destiny crest to appear on her hand. Cecil explains the crest does not identify the heroine like Bertia thought; it is a blessing from Zeno identifying Cecil's chosen soulmate. Having not known this, Bertia has Kuro give the same crest to Cecil. As crests are permanent, Cecil announces they will have to get married, shocking Bertia.
11	"An Observation Log of a Self-proclaimed Villainess and the Royal Family"; Transliteration: "Jishō Akuyaku Reijō to Ōke no Kansatsu Kiroku" (Japanese: 自称悪役令嬢と王家の観察記録。)	Shinnosuke Tonaka	Akiko Inoue	Shinnosuke Tonaka	June 12, 2026
Cecil visits Heronia who insists Bertia must want Cecil to remain unhappy. Cecil points out in her ideal scenario Heronia was kind, yet in reality she is ill-behaved and rude, making her an unsuitable wife and Queen. Heronia tries to summon Pii, but Cecil reveals Pii died and passes her his message and a fragment of Pii's mana core. Cecil has Baron Inderon disinherit Heronia and banished to a convent. Cecil offers either a comfortable convent near the city, or a harsh convent in the frozen North that follows the Divine Light, where Pii's damaged core might eventually be restored. Heronia chooses the North. Cecil asks the King about emotionless humans. The King admits within the royal bloodline a genius child is sometimes born without emotions, making them dangerous if they find something they love, as they will follow it obsessively. He reveals the first king, Toujin, was emotionless until he fell in love with war and only stopped when his wife, Annei, threatened to leave him. Obsessed with Annei's happiness, Toujin devoted himself to peace and was renamed Hero King. The king is relieved Bertia awoke Cecil's emotions, as in the past kings with evil obsessions had to be assassinated. Cecil decides not to tell Bertia, wanting her to stay with him for love, not duty. Two years later, a child in the Noches house decides to sabotage Bertia's wedding.
12	"An Observation Log of a Self-proclaimed Villainess as a Wife"; Transliteration: "Jishō Akuyaku Reijō de Tsuma no Kansatsu Kiroku" (Japanese: 自称悪役令嬢で妻の観察記録。)	Ryota Komatsu	Akiko Inoue	Junichi Yamamoto	June 19, 2026
Bertia's younger brother Aneth insists Cecil should marry Heronia and leave Bertia alone, having grown up listening to Bertia's villainess ramblings. Cecil bribes him with sweets and promises not to betray Bertia by forming a harem. Several days later the wedding ceremony begins. Kuro secretly passes Cecil one of Bertia's notebooks, listing things she wanted to do on her wedding day. The King presents them with the official rings of Crown Prince and Crown Princess. Against kingdom tradition, Cecil places Bertia's ring on her finger, something she had wanted in her notebook. Bertia forgets the official vows and makes up new ones. During the second official kiss Cecil feel unusual, and Bertia realises Cecil is feeling shy for the first time. Cecil ends the ceremony by carrying Bertia like a princess and providing a bouquet for her to throw. Misunderstanding it as a game, the bouquet is caught by Kuro. When Bertia explains Kuro might be next to get married, Kuro glances at Zeno. After the party, Cecil reveals he had Bertia's notebook, embarrassing her. Several days later, they depart for their honeymoon discussing their future children. A year later, Bertia still receives letters asking for wedding advice, leading her to publish the wedding magazine Bertia, which becomes hugely popular. Cecil is surprised Bertia rushes in with important news, making him glad she can still make life so interesting.

== Reception ==
In 2021, the manga adaptation, alongside The Savior's Book Café Story in Another World, won the Isekai Comic Prize at NTT Solmare's Digital Comic Awards 2021.

== See also ==
- 7th Time Loop, another light novel series with the same illustrator
- Goodbye, Overtime! This Reincarnated Villainess Is Living for Her New Big Brother, another light novel series with the same illustrator
- I Was Reincarnated as the Villainess in an Otome Game, but the Boys Love Me Anyway!, another light novel series with the same illustrator
