= From Bumbling Prodigy to Villainess: Will the Duke's Love Go Unnoticed? =

Japanese light novel series

- First light novel volume cover

無能才女は悪女になりたい ～義妹の身代わりで嫁いだ令嬢、公爵様の溺愛に気づかない～ (Munō Saijo wa Akujo ni Naritai: Gimai no Migawari de Totsuida Reijō, Kōshaku-sama no Dekiai ni Kizukanai)
- Genre: Romantic fantasy
- Novel series
- Written by: Saki Ichibu
- Published by: Shōsetsuka ni Narō
- Original run: April 13, 2022 – present
- Light novel
- Written by: Saki Ichibu
- Illustrated by: Yukako Fujimura
- Published by: ASCII Media Works
- English publisher: NA: Cross Infinite World
- Imprint: Dengeki no Shin Bungei
- Original run: March 17, 2023 – present
- Volumes: 6
- Manga

The Woebegone Wonder Girl Wants to Be Wicked
- Written by: Saki Ichibu
- Illustrated by: Sora Gōto
- Published by: Kadokawa Shoten
- English publisher: NA: Kadokawa
- Imprint: Flos Comic
- Magazine: KadoComi
- Original run: April 28, 2023 – present
- Volumes: 4
- icon

From Bumbling Prodigy to Villainess: Will the Duke's Love Go Unnoticed? (無能才女は悪女になりたい ～義妹の身代わりで嫁いだ令嬢、公爵様の溺愛に気づかない～, Munō Saijo wa Akujo ni Naritai: Gimai no Migawari de Totsuida Reijō, Kōshaku-sama no Dekiai ni Kizukanai) is a Japanese light novel series written by Saki Ichibu and illustrated by Yukako Fujimura. It began serialization as a web novel published on Shōsetsuka ni Narō in April 2022. It later began publication under ASCII Media Works' Dengeki no Shin Bungei imprint in March 2023. A manga adaptation illustrated by Sora Gōto began serialization on Kadokawa Corporation's KadoComi website in April 2023.

== Synopsis ==
Avril is a prodigy who despite her talents is branded as incompetent by her parents. She is forced to fill in for her step-sister's place in a marriage with a Duke of Lanchester who is rumored to be a lecherous old man. However, the Duke is revealed to be an attractive young man named Dylan, who is looking to marry a villainess, and presents Avril with a contract which gives Avril the opportunity to secure freedom from her family. The contract asks Avril to act as a villainess in their marriage for three years, then they will divorce. However, due to Avril's antics in pretending to be a villainess, Dylan starts to genuinely develop feelings for her.

== Characters ==
Avril Allingham (エイヴリル・アリンガム, Eivuriru Aringamu)
Voiced by: Aya Uchida (PV)
Dylan (ディラン, Diran)
Voiced by: Koki Uchiyama (PV)

== Media ==
=== Light novel ===
Written by Saki Ichibu, From Bumbling Prodigy to Villainess: Will the Duke's Love Go Unnoticed? began serialization as web novel published on Shōsetsuka ni Narō on April 13, 2022. It later began publication under ASCII Media Works' Dengeki no Shin Bungei light novel imprint featuring illustrations by Yukako Fujimura on March 17, 2023. Six volumes have been released as of April 17, 2026.

In July 2026, Cross Infinite World announced that they had licensed the series for English digital-only publication, with the first volume releasing in September later in the year.

No.	Original release date	Original ISBN	North American release date	North American ISBN
1	March 17, 2023	978-4-04-914752-0	September 30, 2026	979-8-8856-0244-0
Prologue; Chapter 1: "A Stand-in for the Villainess Bride"; Chapter 2: "A Contractual Marriage? I'll Take It"; Chapter 3: "Nice to Meet You, Villainess"; Chapter 4: "To Bear the Brand of a Bumbling Villainess"; Interlude: "Dylan Lanchester"; Chapter 5: "The Villainess and the Salon Concert"; Chapter 6: "The Oblivious Villainess"; Chapter 7: "The Ignorant Visitor"; Chapter 8: "She's Bumbling, not Brilliant!"; Chapter 9: "Ominous Footfalls and the Younger Sister"; Chapter 10: "Bride Swap"; Epilogue; Side story: "The Villainess Prays for her Friend's Happiness"
2	October 17, 2023	978-4-04-915289-0	October 31, 2026	979-8-8856-0246-4
Prologue; Chapter 1: "The Villainess and the Masquerade"; Chapter 2: "The Villainess's Mission"; Chapter 3: "A New Request"; Chapter 4: "To Lanchester Duchy"; Chapter 5: "Avril the Maid's Investigation"; Interlude: "Theresa Panella's Scheme"; Chapter 6: "His Fiancee Is a Villainess?"; Interlude: "Solidarity Between Mistresses"; Chapter 7: "The Villainess Enjoys Teatime"; Interlude: "Brandon Lanchester"; Side Story 1: "Dylan Lanchester's Letter"; Side Story 2: "Alexandra and Lawrence"
3	March 15, 2024	978-4-04-915409-2	November 30, 2026	979-8-8856-0248-8
4	January 17, 2025	978-4-04-915761-1	—	—
5	September 17, 2025	978-4-04-916508-1	—	—
6	April 17, 2026	978-4-04-916509-8	—	—

=== Manga ===
A manga adaptation illustrated by Sora Gōto began serialization on Kadokawa Corporation's KadoComi manga website on April 28, 2023. The manga's chapters have been compiled into four tankōbon volumes as of April 2026.

The manga's chapters are published in English on Kadokawa Corporation's BookWalker website under the title The Woebegone Wonder Girl Wants to Be Wicked.

No.	Release date	ISBN
1	October 16, 2023	978-4-04-682850-7
2	August 16, 2024	978-4-04-683903-9
3	May 1, 2025	978-4-04-684737-9
4	April 17, 2026	978-4-04-685790-3

=== Other ===
In commemoration of the release of the sixth volume of the light novel and the fourth volume of the manga, a promotional video was uploaded to the Dengeki Bunko YouTube channel on April 17, 2026. The promotional video featured voice performances from Aya Uchida and Koki Uchiyama.

== See also ==
- Reincarnated in a Mafia Dating Sim, another light novel series whose manga adaptation shares the same illustrator
