= 7th Time Loop =

Japanese light novel series and its adaptations

- 7th Time Loop: The Villainess Enjoys a Carefree Life Married to Her Worst Enemy!
- First light novel volume cover

ループ7回目の悪役令嬢は、元敵国で自由気ままな花嫁生活を満喫する (Loop 7-kaime no Akuyaku Reijō wa, Moto Tekikoku de Jiyū Kimamana Hanayome Seikatsu o Mankitsu Suru)
- Genre: Fantasy; Romance
- Novel series
- Written by: Touko Amekawa
- Published by: Shōsetsuka ni Narō
- Original run: February 7, 2020 – present
- Light novel
- Written by: Touko Amekawa
- Illustrated by: Wan Hachipisu
- Published by: Overlap
- English publisher: NA: Seven Seas Entertainment
- Imprint: Overlap Novels f
- Original run: October 25, 2020 – present
- Volumes: 6
- Manga
- Written by: Touko Amekawa
- Illustrated by: Hinoki Kino
- Published by: Overlap
- English publisher: NA: Seven Seas Entertainment
- Magazine: Comic Gardo
- Original run: December 4, 2020 – present
- Volumes: 8
- Anime television series
- Directed by: Kazuya Iwata
- Written by: Touko Machida
- Music by: Satoshi Hōno; Ryūnosuke Kasai
- Studio: Studio Kai; Hornets
- Licensed by: Crunchyroll: SA/SEA: Muse Communication
- Original network: AT-X, Tokyo MX, BS11
- Original run: January 7, 2024 – March 24, 2024
- Episodes: 12
- icon

7th Time Loop: The Villainess Enjoys a Carefree Life Married to Her Worst Enemy! (Note: Japanese: ループ7回目の悪役令嬢は、元敵国で自由気ままな花嫁生活を満喫する, Hepburn: Loop 7-kaime no Akuyaku Reijō wa, Moto Tekikoku de Jiyū Kimamana Hanayome Seikatsu o Mankitsu Suru) is a Japanese light novel series written by Touko Amekawa. The series originated on the Shōsetsuka ni Narō website in February 2020, before being published in print with illustrations by Wan Hachipisu by Overlap beginning in October 2020. As of December 2023, six volumes have been released. A manga adaptation with illustrations by Hinoki Kino began serialization on the Comic Gardo website in December 2020. As of December 2025, the series' individual chapters have been collected into eight volumes. An anime television series adaptation produced by Studio Kai and Hornets aired from January to March 2024.

== Premise ==
A young noblewoman, Rishe Irmgard Weitzner, has her engagement to the crown prince of her kingdom annulled—an event she has now experienced for the seventh time. Trapped in a recurring time loop, she has made different choices in each life, choosing different jobs and lifestyle, yet every timeline has ended the same way: her death at the age of twenty, five years after the annulment, as a result of a war with her kingdom and the neighboring one. In her seventh life, she encounters Crown Prince Arnold Hein of the neighboring Galkhein Empire, the man responsible for instigating the war in all of her previous lives. This unexpected meeting presents the possibility of a dramatically different future, one that may finally allow her to survive beyond the age of twenty. Retaining vivid memories of her sixth life, Rishe accepts Arnold's proposal of marriage under several conditions, including abstaining from official royal duties, maintaining personal distance from him, and living as freely as her status allows. Despite her stated intentions, her position as crown princess compels her to apply the knowledge and skills she acquired in her past lives to improve conditions within Galkhein. As she works to stabilize the empire and avert the war Arnold is fated to begin, their partnership begins to reshape the course of events, offering hope for a more secure future than any she has previously known, and she wonders just what made Arnold's heart grow cold.

== Characters ==
=== Main characters ===
Rishe Irmgard Weitzner (リーシェ・イルムガルド・ヴェルツナー, Rīshe Irumugarudo Verutsunā)
Voiced by: Ikumi Hasegawa
Rishe was a political pawn of her parents, who disowned her when the engagement was annulled. However, she found self-confidence thanks to her various jobs in multiple repeats; being a merchant, herbalist, scholar, maid, hunter, and knight. Exasperated with her efforts to live a good life being made futile by the Galkhein Kingdom's actions, Rishe decides to take advantage of Arnold's proposal in order to have a lazy life, but soon finds herself growing closer to Arnold.
Arnold Hein (アルノルト・ハイン, Arunoruto Hain)
Voiced by: Nobunaga Shimazaki
Crown Prince of the Galkhein Kingdom. In the sixth loop, Rishe was killed by him while posing as a male knight. In the seventh loop however, he conveys a kind but solemn personality on his early appearances. He falls in love with Rishe and is constantly amazed by her beauty, knightly prowess, and other skills; finding her interesting.

=== Supporting characters ===
Kaine Tully (ケイン・タリー, Kein Tarī)
Voiced by: Shinnosuke Tachibana
The president of Aria Trading Company, who picked up Rishe on her first loop. While a trickster willing to stick others with his invoices, he cares very much for his little sister Aria.
Michel Hévin (ミシェル・エヴァン, Misheru Evan)
Voiced by: Daisuke Ono
Riche's professor in her past life. He becomes her professor again in her 7th life. He is from the Kingdom of Coyolles and tries to find a cure for Kyle.
Kyle Morgan Cleverly (カイル・モーガン・クレヴァリー, Kairu Mōgan Kurevarī)
Voiced by: Katsumi Fukuhara
The prince of Coyolles. He is sick with an illness and doesn't have much longer to live. He is kindhearted and will do anything for his kingdom's survival.

==== Galkhein Kingdom ====
Theodore Auguste Hein (テオドール・オーギュスト・ハイン, Teodōru Ōgyusuto Hain)
Voiced by: Mariya Ise
Arnold's younger brother. He sees Arnold as a monster for his ruthlessness and tries to help Rishe escape; not understanding their situations.
Oliver Laurenz Friedheim (オリヴァー・ラウレンツ・フリートハイム, Orivā Raurentsu Furītohaimu)
Voiced by: Shun'ichi Toki
Arnold's personal attendant.

==== Hermity Kingdom ====
Dietrich (ディートリヒ, Dītorihi)
Voiced by: Nobuhiko Okamoto
The prince to whom Rishe was engaged in every time loop. After lies are spread about Rishe, he annuls their engagement. He's narcissistic and full of himself, so it was a shock that Rishe tells him off in the current loop; plus his kinder father forcing humility to ask Rishe to marry Arnold to ensure peace with the Galkhein Kingdom.
Marie (マリー, Marī)
Voiced by: Yui Kondo
The new fianceé of Prince Dietrich who made up the lies about Rishe. However, she did it so she could marry the prince for the sake of her family. Rishe informs her that she is aware of the situation and holds no anger towards her, telling Marie to find happiness for herself.

== Media ==
=== Light novel ===
Written by Touko Amekawa, the series began publication on the novel posting website Shōsetsuka ni Narō on February 7, 2020. The series was later acquired by Overlap, who began publishing the series in print with illustrations by Wan Hachipisu on October 25, 2020. As of June 2025, six volumes and a short story collection have been released.

In October 2021, Seven Seas Entertainment announced that they licensed the series for English publication. In October 2025, Seven Seas announced that they had also licensed the short story collection.

==== Volumes ====
No.	Original release date	Original ISBN	English release date	English ISBN
1	October 25, 2020	978-4-8655-4767-2	July 19, 2022	978-1-63858-393-6
Chapters 1–5; Bonus Story: "The Lullaby of a Heartbeat" (鼓動の刻む子守歌, Kodō no kizamu komori uta)
2	February 25, 2021	978-4-8655-4852-5	December 13, 2022	978-1-63858-394-3
Chapters 1–7; Epilogue; Bonus Story: "Fake Dating for Fleeting Amusement" (恋人ごっこの淡い戲れ, Koibito-gokko no awai tawamure)
3	June 25, 2021	978-4-8655-4944-7	April 25, 2023	978-1-63858-858-0
Chapters 1–6; Bonus Story: "Without the Need for a Lullaby" (子守唄など、いらないくらいに, Komori-uta nado, iranai kurai ni)}
4	November 25, 2021	978-4-8240-0029-3	August 1, 2023	978-1-68579-648-8
Chapters 1–5; Epilogue; Bonus Story: "A Punishment Must Inspire Fear" (お仕置きは、怖くなくてはいけません, Oshioki wa, kowakunakute wa ikemasen); Bonus Story: In Which Raul Asks Rishe If She Likes Arnold's Face
5	August 25, 2023	978-4-8240-0218-1	April 30, 2024	979-8-88843-084-2
Chapters 1–7; Epilogue; Bonus Story: "A Hands-on Examination is the Only Way" (きちんと触れて確かめる, Kichinto furete tashikameru)
6	December 25, 2023	978-4-8240-0690-5	October 1, 2024	979-8-88843-429-1
Chapters 1–5; Epilogue; Bonus Story: "Sweet Practice, Oft Repeated" (甘やかな練習、繰り返し重ねる, Amaya ka na renshū, kurikaeshi kasaneru); Bonus Story: In Which Sweetness Succeeds Sleep
6.5	June 25, 2025	978-4-8240-1225-8	August 4, 2026	979-8-89765-895-4

=== Manga ===
A manga adaptation, illustrated by Hinoki Kino, began serialization on the Comic Gardo website on December 5, 2020. As of December 2025, the series' individual chapters have been collected into eight tankōbon volumes.

In December 2021, Seven Seas Entertainment announced that they licensed the manga for English publication.

==== Volumes ====
No.	Original release date	Original ISBN	English release date	English ISBN
1	June 25, 2021	978-4-8655-4952-2	September 27, 2022	978-1-63858-638-8
1. "It's the 7th Time!" (7回目だもの！, 7-kai-meda mono!); 2. "I Won't Be Doing Anything in the Castle!" (お城ではゴロゴロしますから！, O-jōde wa gorogoro shimasukara!); 3. "Hostages Are Wonderful!" (人質はとっても素晴らしいことです！, Hitojichi wa tottemo subarashī kotodesu!); 4. "I Can't Slack Off in a War!" (侵略戦争になったらゴロゴロできない！, Shinryaku sensō ni nattara gorogoro dekinai!); 5. "Reveal Your Fiancée!" (あなたの婚約者をお披露目ください, Anata no fianse o ohirome kudasai); Bonus Manga: "There Was No One Else?" (緑談はなかったのですか？, Midori-dan wa nakatta nodesu ka?); Bonus Short Story: "An Event During Courtship" (出会いと求婚の幕間におまけ、ひとつの出来事, Deai to kyūkon no makuai ni omake, hitotsu no dekigoto)
2	November 25, 2021	978-4-8240-0036-1	December 13, 2022	978-1-63858-768-2
6. "Are You Hurt?" (お怪我をされていませんか？, O kega o sa rete imasen ka?); 7. "Can You Help Me?" (手を貸してくれる？, Te o kashite kureru?); 8. "Are You Hungry?" (お腹が空いたりしていませんか, Onaka ga sui tari shite imasen ka); 9. "Why Is She Mad?" (どうして怒っているのかしら, Dōshite okotte iru no kashira); 10. "I Want to Know Who You Are" (あなたのことを知りたいのです, Anata no koto o shiritai nodesu); Bonus Short Story: "From the Perspective of the Servant, the Changes in Events After Making a Midnight Snack" (夜食作りのその後におまけ、従者から見た変化の出来事, Yashoku-tsukuri no sonogo ni omake, jūsha kara mita henka no dekigoto)
3	June 25, 2022	978-4-8240-0224-2	June 27, 2023	978-1-68579-559-7
11. "Do We Want to Do It Ourselves?" (我々の手で作り出しませんか？, Wareware no te de tsukuridashimasen ka?); 12. "I Didn't Want to Do This" (この手を使いたくなかったのですが, Kono-te o tsukaitakunakatta nodesuga); 13. "Can You Let Me Through?" (そこを通していただけませんか, Soko o tōshite itadakemasen ka); 14. "I've Come to Settle This" (決着をつけに参りました, Ketchaku o tsuke ni mairimashita); 15. "I Want to Know What You Think" (あなたのお考えをお聞かせください, Anata no o kangae o o kikase kudasai); 16. "I Need You Too" (あなたの力も必要なのです, Anata no chikara mo hitsuyōna nodesu); Bonus Short Story: "From the Perspective of the Younger Brother, His Older Brother, and His Soon-to-be Bride" (弟からの視点によろ、兄と未来の義姉のお話, Otōto kara no shiten ni yoro, ani to mirai no gishi no ohanashi)
4	February 25, 2023	978-4-8240-0431-4	December 5, 2023	979-8-88843-064-4
17. "Can You Teach Me Something?" (なんでもひとつ教えていただけますか？, Nan demo hitotsu oshiete itadakemasu ka?); 18. "Am I That Easy to Read?" (そこまで分かりやすいですか!?, Soko made wakari yasuidesu ka!?); 19. "It's Good for You!" (体に良いんですよ？, Karada ni yoi ndesu yo?); 20. "Who Are You Waiting For?" (誰を待っているのですか？, Dare o matte iru nodesu ka?); 21. "It Tastes Awful" (お味がとても不味いのです, O aji ga totemo mazui nodesu); Interlude: "Likes and Dislikes" (好き嫌いの話, Sukikirai no hanashi); Bonus Short Story: "The Crown Prince and His Fiancée Receive a Scolding after Sneaking Around" (お忍び俊、皇太子とその婚約者への小言について, Oshinobi toshi, kōtaishi to sono fianse e no kogoto ni tsuite)
5	August 25, 2023	978-4-8240-0599-1	June 25, 2024	979-8-88843-783-4
22. "What Kind of Person Are You?" (一体どんなお方なのですか？, Ittai don'na o-katana nodesu ka?); 23. "Another Turning Point" (これはひとつの転換点だわ, Kore wa hitotsu no tenkan-tenda wa); 24. "Don't You Have a Fiancée?" (婚約者の方がいらっしゃるのでは......, Fianse no kata ga irassharu node wa......); 25. "Isn't It Beautiful?" (ね。とっても綺麗, Ne. Tottemo kirei); 26. "I Will Return" (またここに帰ってきます, Mata koko ni kaette kimasu); Bonus Short Story: "What It Means to Be a Fiancée, after Being Discovered Cross-Dressing" (男装発覚後、婚約者たる身の自覚について, Dansō hakkaku-go, fiansetaru mi no jikaku ni tsuite)
6	February 25, 2024	978-4-8240-0751-3	November 26, 2024	979-8-89160-623-4
27. "You Can Exist in This World" (この世界に存在して良いんです, Kono sekai ni sonzai shite yoi ndesu); 28. "In This Life, I Know Him" (7回目の人生の私は知っている, 7-kai-me no jinsei no watashi wa shitte iru); 29. "Because I Am Your Student" (私があなたの教え子だからです, Watashi ga anata no oshiegodakaradesu); 30. "I Want to Get to Know My Husband" (一番知りたいのは私の旦那さまのことです, Ichiban shiritai no wa watashi no dan'na-sama no kotodesu); 31. "Please Put the Ring on Me" (私に指輪を嵌めてください, Watashi ni yubiwa o hamete kudasai); Bonus Short Story: "A Gift to Rishe, the World's Most Beautiful Blue" (世界で一番美しい青色と、それを贈られたリーシェのお話, Sekai de ichiban utsukushī aoiro to, sore o okura reta Rīshe no ohanashi)
7	October 25, 2024	978-4-8240-0984-5	June 17, 2025	979-8-89373-313-6
32. "You Never Change" (相変わらずですね, Aikawarazudesu ne); 33. "You Have a Calm Expression" (穏やかな表情をなさっていますよ, Odayakana hyōjō o nasatte imasu yo); 34. "You're Teasing Me Again...!" (意地悪なふりをなさっているでしょう......！, Ijiwaruna furi o nasatte irudeshou......!); 35. "Please Keep It a Secret" (内緒にしてくださいね, Naisho ni shite kudasai ne); 36. "I've Missed You" (お会いできなくてさみしかったです, O ai dekinakute samishikattadesu); Bonus Short Story: "For Rishe, a Story Told by Arnold" (書き下ろし小説：リーシェのたぬに、アルノルトが教えてくれるお話, Rīshe notanu ni, Arunoruto ga oshietekureru ohanashi); Hinoki Kino Design Works
8	December 25, 2025	978-4-8240-1470-2	October 27, 2026	979-8-89765-320-1

=== Anime ===
An anime television series adaptation was announced on August 18, 2023. It will be produced by Studio Kai and Hornets and directed by Kazuya Iwata, with scripts written by Touko Machida, character designs handled by Kenichi Ōnuki, and music composed by Satoshi Hōno and Ryūnosuke Kasai. The series aired from January 7 to March 24, 2024, on AT-X and other networks. The opening theme song is "Another Birthday", performed by Shun'ichi Toki, while the ending theme song is "Kienai" (消えない), performed by The Binary. Crunchyroll licensed the series for worldwide streaming. Muse Communication licensed the series in South and Southeast Asia.

==== Episodes ====
No.	Title	Directed by (Note: Information is taken from the ending credits of each episode.)	Written by	Storyboarded by	Original release date
1	"The Fiancé Who Killed Me"; Transliteration: "Watashi o Koroshita Konyakusha" (Japanese: 私を殺した婚約者)	Toshikatsu Tokoro	Touko Machida	Kazuya Iwata	January 7, 2024
Royal knight Rishe is killed during an invasion by Emperor Arnold of Galkhein Empire, only to awaken 5 years in the past on the night her fiancé Prince Dietrich exiled her for fictitious crimes. Rishe is unconcerned however, as she is stuck in a time loop and this will be the 6th time she has died at 20 and awoken at 15 again on the night of her exile. During each loop she has led completely different lives including merchant, herbalist, scholar, maid and finally royal knight, but each time she inevitably died in a war at 20 and woke up at 15 again. For her 7th life she decides to live a quiet, easy life, but immediately encounters Arnold, who murdered her in her 6th life only minutes ago. Being 5 years younger, Arnold is not yet Emperor, and he is instantly drawn to her confidence, though she is indifferent to him since it was the war Arnold started that has killed her 6 times. The delay causes her to have a second confrontation with Dietrich in which she humiliates him in public and even shows sympathy for his next fiancée Lady Marie. Sensing an attack, she defends herself from a surprise strike from Arnold, who has deduced from her movements that she is a sword master. Arnold is even more impressed and suddenly asks her to marry him.
2	"The Golden Imperial Capital"; Transliteration: "Kiniro ni Somaru Sumeragi to" (Japanese: 金色に染まる皇都)	Yoshikawa Shigatsu	Touko Machida	Kazuya Iwata; Minoru Ohara	January 14, 2024
Dietrich's father the King arrives disgusted by Dietrich's behaviour and apologises to Rishe, imploring her to accept Arnold's proposal to maintain friendship between their nations. Rishe accepts, hoping to discover why Arnold declares war in the future after assassinating his own father. She also informs Arnold he is never to touch her and she won't be performing any royal duties. Travelling to his Empire they are attacked by bandits, and Rishe is surprised that Arnold shows mercy by defeating them without killing them. Rishe earns his men's loyalty by mixing an antidote for their poisoned sword wounds. Arnold thanks her, as each of his knights are valued friends. Rishe is confused what could turn such a caring man into a tyrant. Arnold reveals for political reasons she is technically his hostage, though Rishe is pleased as this will provide a justification for lazing around. Arriving in Galkhein, Rishe takes over a disused royal villa which she cleans herself, puzzling her guards. She also encounters and helps Elsie, a new maid being bullied by older maids. Arnold grows even more enamoured with her as her skills are unusual for noble ladies, to have and promises to support her in doing whatever she wants. Rishe refuses to fall for his charm and is determined to uncover the evil in his heart.
3	"A Thinly Veiled Sword Dance (Rondo)"; Transliteration: "Usuginugoshi no Kenbu (Rondo)" (Japanese: 薄衣越しの剣舞(ロンド))	Munehisa Sakai	Touko Machida	Munehisa Sakai	January 21, 2024
Arnold decides to reveal Rishe as his fiancée at a royal party. This does not sit well with the nobles' jealous daughters who attempt to prank her, though she easily outwits them. While dancing with Arnold, Rishe analyses his movements to decipher how he killed her so easily and discovers his left shoulder is covered in old scars that limit his movement, though he asks her to keep this secret. While helping the maids, Rishe notes most of the bullying is from senior maid Diana and quickly determines the reason. At the maid selection Diana is horrified to learn Rishe is Arnold's fiancée and that Elsie and other junior maids have been selected while she has not. Rishe points out that, as a merchant's daughter, Diana is the only maid who can read and write which helped her learn faster, causing her to become frustrated at slow learners like Elsie. Realising her error, Diana sincerely apologises and is amazed when Rishe declares her royal villa will be where all junior maids train with Diana in charge of teaching them to read and write. Arnold is amused by Rishe's craftiness. Rishe arranges a meeting with Kaine Tully of the Aria Trading Company, the merchant who trained her in her first life, whom she is determined to have as her ally once again.
4	"Turning the Knave into a Secret Spice"; Transliteration: "Supaisu wa Kakushimi ni" (Japanese: 曲者(スパイス)は隠し味に)	Yukio Takahashi	Futa Takei	Yukio Takahashi	January 28, 2024
Kaine refuses to do business with her, pointing out a future queen would never use such a small trading company for her wedding without a political motive, and he is uninterested in royal politics. Needing him to avoid Arnold's future war, Rishe remembers Kaine's fondness for risky gambles and sneaks out of the palace to offer him a deal; if in 7 days she can create a profitable business he will become her trading partner no questions asked. Arnold is upset, not that she snuck out as she is free to do as she wants, but she did so without guards. He then insists next time she sneaks out she take him with her for protection and fun. After sharing a midnight snack Rishe tells him of her wager with Kaine but hides the details. Arnold is amused, then abruptly warns Rishe if she encounters his younger brother, Theodore, she should ignore him. The next day she encounters Theodore, who conspiratorially warns her he will free her from being Arnold's hostage. Rishe overhears Arnold creating a policy that the army protect civilians, not just nobles, once again confusing her how different he is to his future self. With a fake note from Arnold Theodore succeeds in luring Rishe to a church alone at midnight.
5	"Another Kind of Trade"; Transliteration: "Mō Hitotsu no Akinai" (Japanese: もうひとつの商い)	Shuji Saito	Futa Takei	Kunihisa Sugishima	February 4, 2024
Theodore tries to impress on Rishe that Arnold is a war criminal who even killed their mother, then is shocked that Rishe already knew and even brought Arnold to the meeting. Theodore quickly leaves. Despite his anger Rishe asks why so many people think he is evil when he does so much good. Arnold hints at atrocities he had to commit during war and is surprised by her willingness to confront him, then shocks her with their first kiss. Rishe enlists her maids in creating nail polish to show Kaine and learns from Elsie that poverty is quite a problem. Rishe thus offers Kaine exclusive rights to manufacture the polish as long as he only hires workers from the slums. Kaine is skeptical until Rishe recites a lesson she once learned from him. When he still refuses Rishe reveals she knows he has a sick sister, Aria. Kaine is furious until Rishe reveals she has been cultivating her own herb garden for this express reason and has created a medicine to cure her for free, even if he still refuses her partnership. Casting aside his arrogance Kaine agrees to Rishe's proposal without further hesitation. Rishe faints from her several sleepless nights but is later kidnapped from her room by Elsie and her guard Kamil, who take her to Theodore.
6	"The Only One in the World"; Transliteration: "Sekai ni Tatta Hitori no" (Japanese: 世界にたったひとりの)	Shigatsu Yoshikawa; Takahiro Tanaka	Futa Takei	Yui Umemoto	February 11, 2024
Flashbacks show Rishe agreed to be kidnapped as Elsie and Kamil were born in the slums where Theodore has been doing charity work for years. Theodore demands Arnold give up being royal heir, but Arnold reveals Theodore has underestimated Rishe, who suddenly walks into the room, having defeated her guards and escaped. She deduces Theodore's true goal was to dishonour himself and be exiled rather than stay knowing Arnold has no interest in him. After Theodore runs away Rishe accuses Arnold of only acting uninterested so Theodore will be less upset if Arnold dies in another war. She then shames him with the possibility Theodore might die first, and if so, Arnold would definitely regret mistreating him. Rishe finds Theodore on the roof and hints she has a plan to save Arnold. Theodore is too upset and throws himself off the roof, hoping his death will force Arnold to stay alive as sole surviving heir. Arnold appears and catches him, leading to Arnold admitting he does care about Theodore. Relieved, Rishe is finally able to sleep for the first time in a week, collapsing in Arnold's arms. Awakening later, Arnold thanks her for helping Theodore and then teases her with the memory of their kiss. Theodore resumes charity work while offering Rishe access to his agents from the slums to support her plan for saving Arnold.
7	"A Lullaby Like the Beat of a Heart"; Transliteration: "Kodō Kizamu Komoriuta" (Japanese: 鼓動刻む子守唄)	Kazuya Iwata; Riki Fukushima	Toshizo Nemoto	Kunihisa Sugishima	February 18, 2024
Rishe asks Theodore for an unusual favour. She then asks Arnold to start living with her in her villa, in separate bedrooms. Arnold knows she is plotting something but agrees anyway as he is sure it will be amusing. Rishe asks Arnold to instruct her in the sword style used only by him and the Imperial Guards. During the duel Rishe compares Arnold with his future self and starts to understand his sword technique, but still loses to him. Arnold notices she moves as though she has fought an opponent even stronger than him and wonders who it was. For his victory Arnold invites her to visit the city with him in two days. He then embarrasses her by carrying her back to the villa as her legs are too tired to walk. After he moves into the villa, Rishe notices Arnold skipping sleep to carry on working and stubbornly helps him take a nap, during which she notices his scars again. Arnold notices it is easier to sleep while sharing a bed than sleeping alone. Rishe accidentally falls asleep too, and is embarrassed when they are almost seen by Arnold's secretary Oliver. Rishe acquires a wig from Kaine and uses it to disguise herself so she can be accepted on a ten day training course to become a knight.
8	"The Color of the Sea beyond the Horizon"; Transliteration: "Umishoku no Kanata" (Japanese: 海色の彼方)	Yukio Takahashi	Toshizo Nemoto	Yukio Takahashi	February 25, 2024
With Theodore's unusual favour Rishe is accepted into the training as a man named Lucius, overseen by Count Lawvine, whom Rishe remembers is exceptionally loyal but is executed as a war criminal by Arnold in 3 years. For their visit to the city Rishe is, against her will, dressed very prettily by Elsie as though it were a date. Arnold takes Rishe to meet Mihaela, a very exclusive jewelry shop owner, who tests Rishe to identify fake gemstones. With her merchant training Rishe passes the test easily. Having impressed her, Mihaela agrees Arnold may purchase an item for Rishe; specifically, the ring for their wedding. Rishe is surprised, as rings are not used in Galkhein's wedding ceremony, but is convinced to accept it after Arnold points out such an expensive purchase will benefit the economy noticeably. Rishe embarrasses herself by requesting a jewel of the same icy blue as Arnold's eyes. From several clues Rishe deduces Arnold timed their trip to coincide with the arrival of Prince Kyle from the Coyolles Kingdom, a small but wealthy nation Arnold destroys in the future. Rishe remembers him from her life as an herbalist as Kyle is sickly. Arnold dislikes Kyle and is certain he is up to something, so he wants Lawvine to watch him. Rishe worries if Lawvine spends too much time around them he will realise she is Lucius.
9	"Visitor from the North"; Transliteration: "Kita Kara no Raihōsha" (Japanese: 北からの来訪者)	Shigatsu Yoshikawa	Toshizo Nemoto	Kunihisa Sugishima	March 3, 2024
Rishe struggles over how to get Kyle the medicine he needs without Lawvine seeing her. By chance she encounters Professor Michel, her herbalism instructor from her third life. With Michel's support Kyle is convinced to take Rishe's new medicine. Michel senses Riche despises the medicine, unaware that in her third life they created it together but disagreed over using human test subjects. Due to the late hour Arnold comes to fetch Rishe and gifts her his own pocket watch so she will stop being late. Rishe shares with Arnold that Michel actually considers himself an alchemist. At a party Rishe is satisfied her medicine is already improving Kyle's health. Using the hunting skills from her fifth life Rishe is able to mingle with the guests without making it obvious she is avoiding Lawvine. Kyle asks Arnold to supply soldiers to protect Coyolles in exchange for gold and jewels, but Arnold sees through his deception and deduces Coyolles is actually in dire circumstances from its gold mines running out of gold. Rather than helping Coyolles fight its enemies, Arnold points out Galkhein would profit more by conquering Coyolles first. Rishe knows this is a vital moment that will shape the future and to avoid war she needs Arnold to believe Kyle is his equal deserving of his help, but has no idea how to achieve this.
10	"A Sweetly Fragrant Cigarette Is Lit"; Transliteration: "Kaori Tabako ni Hi ga Tomoru" (Japanese: 香り煙草に火がともる)	Shunpei Umemoto	Touko Machida	Hiroaki Yoshikawa	March 10, 2024
Michel hopes to have a discussion with Arnold about alchemy. Rishe falls behind during training as she fears the war growing closer. Lawvine shares her worries as his son died in the previous war. Arnold decides to observe the training and recognises her, but says nothing to Lawvine. Instead he confronts her privately and, finding the situation amusing, allows her to continue training on strict condition she not be discovered. Rishe speaks with Kyle and learns he respects Arnold, having realised Arnold committed acts of cruelty knowing it would benefit the world later, such as slaughtering an enemy kingdom's royal family to end a war quickly and prevent further suffering to the commoners. Rishe decides to form her own alliance with Kyle. Michel reveals to Rishe he plans to sell Arnold his creation, explosive Black Powder for use in war, unaware their disagreement about black powder ended their friendship in her 3rd life. Growing desperate, Rishe asks Theodore to lend her some of his spies for a small but helpful act of rebellion, which amuses Theodore greatly. Michel recalls even as a child he excelled at creating new methods of death and destruction, coming to believe the sole reason he was born was to help destroy the world.
11	"The Determination of a Snow Flower"; Transliteration: "Yukibana no Ketsui" (Japanese: 雪花の決意)	Shuji Saito	Touko Machida	Kazuya Iwata; Masayoshi Nishida	March 17, 2024
While observing fireflies together Rishe finds it odd Arnold is the cause of all her fear and yet she is still drawn to him. To better see the fireflies, she impulsively jumps from her balcony to Arnold's, who catches her. Arnold dislikes the fireflies, which resemble flaming torches on battlefields, and admits that he despises his father, the Emperor, and by extension the entire Galkhein Kingdom. He then warns Rishe if there comes a time she stands in his way, he will kill her himself. Despite this, Rishe promises she will change how he sees the world. As part of her plan, Rishe obtains several rare metals from Kyle. Michel manages to evade Theodore's men following him. Rishe helps Kyle plead his case that his kingdom's jewelers could easily turn their skills to clockwork mechanisms like those found in Arnold's incredibly rare pocket watch, leading to valuable breakthroughs in technology. Arnold points out he could gain these things anyway by a military takeover of Coyolles, though Kyle still chooses to hope Arnold will choose a future of peace over another war. Theodore interrupts the meeting to tell Rishe that Michel disappeared for three hours, only to allow himself to be found in the castle gardens. Rishe and Theodore are surprised by Arnold's reaction and have no idea what he is planning to do.
12	"The Most Beautiful Thing"; Transliteration: "Ichiban Utsukushī Mono" (Japanese: いちばん美しいもの)	Yukio Takahashi	Touko Machida	Kunihisa Sugishima	March 24, 2024
Michel announces he has placed a bomb in town to show Arnold the power of black powder. However, Rishe knew from her previous life the details of his plan, and with Theodore's assistance the bomb has already been turned into fireworks. Michel realises Rishe was trying to show him that just because black powder is destructive does not mean it cannot be used for good. Arnold forms a treaty with Coyolles. Arnold is tempted to assassinate Michel in secret, so Rishe reveals it was Michel who invented the pocket watch, making him too valuable to kill. Rishe hopes Arnold will learn the same lesson as Michel and realise his skills aren't only valuable for waging wars. Rishe's ring is delivered, and though Arnold hesitates to place any real importance on it, he is surprised when Rishe insists it already has deep emotional value to her and insists he place it on her finger himself. Arnold is amazed how happy it makes him to see her wearing the ring. Rishe asks if they can go on a trip to find even more wonderful things for Arnold to enjoy, but Arnold refuses, hinting he already has something wonderful he enjoys very much. Rishe is happy to have changed Arnold's heart even just a little and plans to make many more small changes that will eventually save the future.

== Reception ==
Rebecca Silverman from Anime News Network praised the heroine, artwork, and the story, calling it unique.

Naoki Harada, an editor for Comic Gardo, picked the manga as his favorite manga from 2021.

By February 2024, the series had over 1 million copies in circulation.

== See also ==
- Goodbye, Overtime! This Reincarnated Villainess Is Living for Her New Big Brother, another light novel series with the same illustrator
- I Was Reincarnated as the Villainess in an Otome Game, but the Boys Love Me Anyway!, another light novel series with the same illustrator
- An Observation Log of My Fiancée Who Calls Herself a Villainess, another light novel series with the same illustrator
- Reincarnated in a Mafia Dating Sim, another light novel series with the same writer
