= Goodbye, Overtime! This Reincarnated Villainess Is Living for Her New Big Brother =

Japanese light novel series

- First light novel volume cover

悪役令嬢、ブラコンにジョブチェンジします (Akuyaku Reijō, Burakon ni Jobu Chenji Shimasu)
- Genre: Isekai
- Novel series
- Written by: Chidori Hama
- Published by: Shōsetsuka ni Narō
- Original run: February 9, 2019 – present
- Light novel
- Written by: Chidori Hama
- Illustrated by: Wan Hachipisu
- Published by: Kadokawa Shoten
- English publisher: NA: J-Novel Club
- Imprint: Kadokawa Beans Bunko
- Original run: November 11, 2019 – present
- Volumes: 9
- Manga
- Written by: Chidori Hama
- Illustrated by: Cosaji
- Published by: Kadokawa Shoten
- English publisher: NA: J-Novel Club
- Imprint: Flos Comic
- Magazine: KadoComi; Nico Nico Seiga
- Original run: May 21, 2021 – May 5, 2023
- Volumes: 3

Goodbye, Overtime! This Reincarnated Villainess Is Living for Her New Big Brother (悪役令嬢、ブラコンにジョブチェンジします, Akuyaku Reijō, Burakon ni Jobu Chenji Shimasu) is a Japanese light novel series written by Chidori Hama and illustrated by Wan Hachipisu. It began serialization as a web novel on Shōsetsuka ni Narō in February 2019. It was later acquired by Kadokawa Shoten who began publishing it under their Kadokawa Beans Bunko imprint in November 2019. A manga adaptation illustrated by Cosaji was serialized on Kadokawa's KadoComi and Nico Nico Seiga websites from May 2021 to May 2023, with its chapters collected in three volumes.

== Synopsis ==
Rina Yukimura is an overworked systems engineer whose only solace is a side character of an otome game she has gotten into recently. One day, she wakes up as the villainess of the game, Ekaterina Yulnova, and she is initially excited because to her it meant that she would get closer to her favorite side character, Alexei, who is the villainess's big brother. She later learns that if she continues following the game's story, she and Alexei will face a horrible ending, so she attempts to avoid any death flags in order to make her big brother happy.

== Media ==
=== Light novel ===
Written by Chidori Hama, Goodbye Overtime! This Reincarnated Villainess Is Living for Her New Big Brother began serialization as a web novel on Shōsetsuka ni Narō on February 9, 2019. It was later acquired by Kadokawa Shoten who began releasing it with illustrations by Wan Hachipisu under their Kadokawa Beans Bunko light novel imprint on November 1, 2019. Nine volumes have been released as of July 31, 2026. The series is licensed in English by J-Novel Club.

No.	Original release date	Original ISBN	North American release date	North American ISBN
1	November 1, 2019	978-4-04-108808-1	June 3, 2024	978-1-71-830650-9
1. Prologue: "The Corporate Drone and the Villainess"; 2. Chapter 1: "Entering the Magic Academy"; 3. Chapter 2: "The Heroine and the Imperial Prince"; 4. Chapter 3: "The Flag for the Fall"; 5. Chapter 4: "A Monster Appears"; 6. Epilogue: "Once a Villainess, Always a Villainess"; Extra: "Alexei's Overwork Flag (and Ekaterina's Trauma)"
2	June 1, 2020	978-4-04-109553-9	August 27, 2024	978-1-71-830652-3
1. Prologue: "ICBM - Intercontinental Ballistic Message!"; 2. Chapter 1: "The Rose of Yulnova"; 3. Chapter 2: "The Imperial Visit"; 4. Interlude: "The Narcissus of Yulmagna"; 5. Chapter 3: "Examination Results"; 6. Chapter 4: "Presents and Projects"; Extra: "Alexei's Worries (and Another Gift)"
3	December 26, 2020	978-4-04-110958-8	February 24, 2025	978-1-71-830654-7
1. "Before the Departure"; 2. "Journey"; 3. "Villainess vs. Villainess"; 4. "The Bouquet"; Extra: "Ekaterina's First Horseback Ride"
4	June 1, 2021	978-4-04-111453-7	May 19, 2025	978-1-71-830656-1
1. "The Villainess Runs Her First Errand"; 2. "The People of the Forest and the Maiden of Death"; 3. "Isaac and the Gods of the Mountain"; 4. "A Calamity Visits"; 5. "Reunion"; Extra: "Oleg's Reports (or Snippets of a Journey)"
5	December 1, 2021	978-4-04-112078-1	August 19, 2025	978-1-71-830658-5
1. "The Prince Visits"; 2. "The Welcome Banquet"; 3. "The Hunting Tournament"; 4. "Return to the Capital"; Extra: "In the Shadow of the Garden (or the Day They Showed Up at the Fortress)"
6	September 30, 2022	978-4-04-112580-9	November 7, 2025	978-1-71-830660-8
1. "Back to the Residence in the Capital"; 2. "The Magic Academy"; 3. "The House of Selesnoa"; 4. "At the Detached Palace"; Extra: "Alexei's Request (A Present in Progress)"
7	November 1, 2024	978-4-04-113849-6	March 25, 2026	978-1-71-830962-3
1. "Peaceful Days and Shadows"; 2. "The Birth of the Villainess"; 3. "The Blue Rose and the Black Narcissus"; 4. "The Festival Goes Up in Flames?"; Extra: "Alexei and Nikolai (or Nikolai's Reflections)"
8	October 1, 2025	978-4-04-116644-4	July 17, 2026	978-1-71-830964-7
1. "The Curtain Rises Again After the Finale"; 2. "Festival Shenanigans"; 3. "The Jousting Tournament"; 4. "The End of the Festival"; 5. "The Closing Ceremony"; 6. "The Ball Awaits"; Extra: "The Villainess and the Apple Pie"
9	July 31, 2026	978-4-04-117611-5	—	—

=== Manga ===
A manga adaptation illustrated by Cosaji was serialized on Kadokawa's KadoComi and Nico Nico Seiga websites from May 21, 2021 to May 2, 2023. The manga's chapters were collected in three tankōbon volumes released from December 3, 2021 to May 2, 2023. The manga adaptation is also licensed in English by J-Novel Club.

No.	Original release date	Original ISBN	North American release date	North American ISBN
1	December 3, 2021	978-4-04-680975-9	June 5, 2024	978-1-71-839421-6
Chapters 1–5
2	June 3, 2022	978-4-04-681503-3	August 14, 2024	978-1-71-839422-3
Chapters 6–10
3	May 2, 2023	978-4-04-681909-3	September 10, 2025	978-1-71-839423-0
Chapters 11–16

=== Other ===
In commemoration of the release of the fourth volume of the novels, three audio drama adaptations were produced. Two were uploaded to the Kadokawa YouTube channel, and the other was released along with the volume. The dramas featured voice acting from Tatsuhisa Suzuki and Atsushi Tamaru.

== See also ==
- 7th Time Loop, another light novel series with the same illustrator
- I Was Reincarnated as the Villainess in an Otome Game, but the Boys Love Me Anyway!, another light novel series with the same illustrator
- An Observation Log of My Fiancée Who Calls Herself a Villainess, another light novel series with the same illustrator
