= I Was Reincarnated as the Villainess in an Otome Game, but the Boys Love Me Anyway! =

Japanese light novel series

- First light novel volume cover

悪役令嬢ですが攻略対象の様子が異常すぎる (Akuyaku Reijō Desu ga, Kōyaku Taishō no Yōsu ga Ijō Sugiru)
- Genre: Fantasy, romance
- Novel series
- Written by: Sō Inaida
- Published by: Shōsetsuka ni Narō
- Original run: April 21, 2018 – present
- Light novel
- Written by: Sō Inaida
- Illustrated by: Wan Hachipisu
- Published by: TO Books
- Imprint: TO Bunko
- Original run: July 20, 2020 – present
- Volumes: 8
- Manga
- Written by: Sō Inaida
- Illustrated by: Ataka
- Published by: TO Books
- English publisher: NA: Tokyopop
- Imprint: Corona Comics
- Magazine: Comic Corona
- Original run: December 3, 2020 – present
- Volumes: 8

I Was Reincarnated as the Villainess in an Otome Game, but the Boys Love Me Anyway! (悪役令嬢ですが攻略対象の様子が異常すぎる, Akuyaku Reijō Desu ga, Kōyaku Taishō no Yōsu ga Ijō Sugiru) is a Japanese light novel series written by Sō Inaida and illustrated by Wan Hachipisu. It was originally posted as a web novel on the online publication platform Shōsetsuka ni Narō in April 2018. It was then picked up for publication by TO Books, which began releasing it as a light novel in July 2020; eight volumes have been published as of October 2025. A manga adaptation illustrated by Ataka began serialization in December 2020, and has been compiled into eight volumes as of April 2026.

== Plot ==
On her tenth birthday, Mystia Aren suddenly regains memories of her previous life: a Japanese high schooler who died young and was reincarnated into the world of the otome game Kyunkyun Love School (きゅんきゅんらぶすくーる, Kyunkyun Rabu Sukūru). Now being familiar with her fate, Mystia aims to break her engagement to Raid Nocter, knowing how it would originally end badly for her. With her changed personality, Raid and others fall in love with her, which complicates her plan to change her fate.

== Characters ==
Mystia Aren (ミスティア・アーレン, Misutia Aren)
Voiced by: Ayaka Shimizu (drama CD)
The villainess of the otome game Kyunkyun Love School. In her previous life, she was a Japanese high school girl who died after saving a boy from being hit by a truck. Prior to her death, she had been playing Kyunkyun Love School, and she was now reincarnated into its world. In the original game, Mystia was a cruel villainess engaged to Raid Nocter, who treated the game's main character poorly. However, in contrast to the original game, in this world, Mystia has a kind personality, making others develop feelings for her.
Raid Nocter (レイド・ノクター, Reido Nokutā)
Voiced by: Atsushi Tamaru (drama CD)
A prince who was Mystia's fiancé in the original game. However, he fell in love with the main character, much to Mystia's chagrin.
Eric Heim (エリク・ハイム, Eriku Haimu)
Voiced by: Toshiyuki Toyonaga (drama CD)
Robert Weiss (ロベルト・ワイズ, Roberuto Waizu)
Voiced by: Yūki Ono (drama CD)
Jey Seek (ジェイ・シーク, Jei Shīku)
Voiced by: Takuya Satō (drama CD)
Also known as Mr. Jessie, he is a teacher at Mystia's school.
Mero (メロ)
Voiced by: Lynn (drama CD)
Mystia's maid.
Alice Hartspearl (アリス・ハーツパール, Arisu Hātsupāru)
Voiced by: Kaede Hondo (drama CD)
The protagonist of Kyunkyun Love School. In the original game, Raid fell in love with her, which caused Mystia to attack her. Alice then reveals Mystia's misdeeds, leading to Mystia's downfall. However, due to Mystia's changed personality, she too ends up falling in love with her.

== Media ==
=== Light novel ===
Sō Inaida originally serialized the a web novel on the online publication platform Shōsetsuka ni Narō, with the first chapter being posted on April 21, 2018. It was then picked up for publication by TO Books, which began publishing it as a light novel series. The first volume was released on July 20, 2020; eight volumes have been released as of October 1, 2025. The novels have also been released in an audiobook format.

No.	Release date	ISBN
1	July 20, 2020	978-4-86699-013-2
2	November 20, 2020	978-4-86699-086-6
3	April 20, 2021	978-4-86699-195-5
4	August 20, 2021	978-4-86699-304-1
5	December 10, 2021	978-4-86699-382-9
6	February 10, 2022	978-4-86699-425-3
7	October 1, 2025	978-4-86794-737-1
8	October 1, 2025	978-4-86794-738-8

=== Manga ===
A manga adaptation illustrated by Ataka began serialization on the Piccoma service on December 3, 2020, later beginning serialization under the Comic Corona label on January 28, 2021. The first tankōbon volume was released on February 15, 2021; eight volumes have been released as of April 1, 2026. It is currently serialized on TO Books' Corona EX web service. The manga is licensed in English by Tokyopop.

No.	Original release date	Original ISBN	North American release date	North American ISBN
1	February 15, 2021	978-4-86699-125-2	April 1, 2021 (digital); April 20, 2021 (print)	978-1-42786-928-9 (digital); 978-1-42786-752-0 (print)
2	September 15, 2021	978-4-86699-327-0	March 29, 2022	978-1-42787-089-6 (digital); 978-1-42786-881-7 (print)
3	May 2, 2022	978-4-86699-510-6	August 12, 2022 (digital); October 25, 2022 (print)	978-1-42787-183-1 (digital); 978-1-42786-921-0 (print)
4	December 15, 2022	978-4-86699-722-3	July 10, 2023 (digital); August 15, 2023 (print)	978-1-42787-574-7 (digital); 978-1-42787-508-2 (print)
5	October 2, 2023	978-4-86699-957-9	September 24, 2024 (print)	978-1-42787-913-4
6	July 1, 2024	978-4-86794-222-2	January 28, 2025 (print)	978-1-42788-049-9
7	June 2, 2025	978-4-86794-578-0	—	—
8	April 1, 2026	978-4-86794-933-7	—	—
9	December 1, 2026	978-4-86854-210-0	—	—

=== Stage play ===
A stage play adaptation was performed at the Theater Green in Tokyo from February 16 to 20, 2022.

=== Drama CD ===
A drama CD was released on October 2, 2023.

== Reception ==
It was reported in October 2025 that the series had over one million copies in circulation.

Rebecca Silverman and Lynzee Loveridge of Anime News Network reviewed the first volume of the manga. Silverman praised the series' art and characterizations, while noting that it largely follows tropes common to isekai villainess series. She noted how the series' treatment of Mystia's personality contrasted with other villainess works in that she maintained her pre-death personality throughout, instead of only changing her personality after regaining memories of her past life. However, she noted that the series may have had too many love interests. Loveridge was more critical of the volume, noting issues with the plot's treatment of time, or how the initial conflict was resolved too quickly. She also criticized the translation's quality, saying that the wording prevented her from enjoying the story more.

== See also ==
- 7th Time Loop, another light novel series with the same illustrator
- Goodbye, Overtime! This Reincarnated Villainess Is Living for Her New Big Brother, another light novel series with the same illustrator
- An Observation Log of My Fiancée Who Calls Herself a Villainess, another light novel series with the same illustrator
