= The Savior's Book Café Story in Another World =

Japanese web novel series

- First light novel volume cover

異世界に救世主として喚ばれましたが、アラサーには無理なので、ひっそりブックカフェ始めました。 (Isekai ni Kyūseishu to Shite Yobaremashitaga, Arasā ni wa Muri nanode, Hissori Bukku Kafe Hajimemashita.)
- Genre: Isekai
- Novel series
- Written by: Kyōka Izumi
- Published by: Pixiv
- Original run: October 26, 2018 – November 16, 2018
- Manga
- Written by: Kyōka Izumi; Ōmiya (composition)
- Illustrated by: Reiko Sakurada
- Published by: Shogakukan
- English publisher: NA: Seven Seas Entertainment
- Imprint: Ura Sunday Comics
- Magazine: Ura Sunday; MangaONE
- Original run: July 2, 2019 – April 19, 2022
- Volumes: 5
- Light novel
- Written by: Kyōka Izumi
- Illustrated by: Reiko Sakurada
- Published by: Kadokawa Shoten
- Imprint: Kadokawa Beans Bunko
- Original run: June 1, 2020 – December 24, 2021
- Volumes: 3

The Savior's Book Café Story in Another World (異世界に救世主として喚ばれましたが、アラサーには無理なので、ひっそりブックカフェ始めました。, Isekai ni Kyūseishu to Shite Yobaremashitaga, Arasā ni wa Muri nanode, Hissori Bukku Kafe Hajimemashita.) is a Japanese web novel series written by Kyōka Izumi. It was serialized on the Pixiv website from October to November 2018. A manga adaptation with coordination by Ōmiya and illustrations by Reiko Sakurada was serialized on Shogakukan's Ura Sunday manga website and MangaONE app between July 2019 and April 2022. A light novel version with illustrations by Sakurada was published under Kadokawa Shoten's Kadokawa Beans Bunko light novel imprint between June 2020 and December 2021.

== Premise ==
"Go to another world? No thank you." That was what 33-year-old Tsukina said to God when he selected her to be sent as a savior; unlike teenagers, she has a happy life and knows there are more cons than boons. Unfortunately, God won't send her back home, so Tsukina thoroughly asks about magic, planning to open a book café and live a quiet life.

Tsukina isn't the only savior went to that world. God actually needed someone to deal with a lazy and vain candidate that came before her.

== Characters ==
Tsukina
A Japanese woman who was selected against her will by God to be transported there as a savior, instead opting to run the titular book café. She grows close to Il, captain of the knights, who also shares her love of books. Unlike other saviors, Tsukina has no interest in getting attention due to her age making her more cautious than young adults. She instead covertly helps when things get out of hand, typically giving barrier charms to keep Il's squad safe.
Tsukina can use Creation, Barrier and Healing magic. She was also gifted a pendant to manifest whatever she wished, along with her café, by God.
Il
Captain of the knights who enjoys reading on the side. Much like Tsukina, he is in his 30s and has no romantic experience. Il becomes regular patron of the café, falling in love with Tsukina and moving in with her. Il keeps it secret that Tsukina is a savior to avoid the political drama that would unfold from the attention.
He initially held a poor opinion of saviors due to the girl sent before Tsukina being a brat, but after seeing Tsukina's humble admittance to being one along with fellow savior Youta's genuine desire to help others, Il started to realize judging them for just being a savior was wrong.
Bjork
Second-in-command of the knights. He is Il's childhood friend and loves to tease him about his personal life. He held a poor opinion of the Unnamed Savior due to the fact the prince did not coerce her into doing her job
Youta
The next savior after Tsukina to fill in for the absence of the Unnamed Savior; needing to quell searches for her. Unlike previous saviors, he has a genuine, passionate desire to use his powers to help everyone and is very much liked for all his good deeds.
Despite his goodness, he felt inferior due to the barrier Tsukina had placed over the city. A spy from an enemy country played on this vulnerability to trick Youta into breaking the barrier. He was forgiven by everyone after Tsukina repaired the damage, knowing he had been manipulated. He developed a crush on Tsukina for treating him like an equal, but became heartbroken upon learning she was Il's fiancée. Like Tsukina, Youta does not accept polygamy despite the kingdom legalizing.
Bran
A spy from Hagar, a warmongering country God refuses to send saviors to, knowing they would just be exploited as weapons. Bran is a Sham Savior, an artificial being created to supplement the lack of one, resulting in him having weaker power than a real Savior.
After experiencing Tsukina's kindness and growing his own sense of self, he disobeys his orders to abduct the Savior.
God
A deity who keeps sending Earthlings to the other world so that they may improve and protect it. He can grant multiple wishes to those summoned. He seems quite incompetent at his job, picking people at random without heeding their will in whether they want to go or return home. After Tsukina scolds him for recklessly sending random teenagers repeatedly, God decided to screen all future candidates' moral compasses, which led to Youta being chosen as the next Savior.
He frequently visits Tsukina in mortal form whenever he needs to inform her of danger, though Tsukina is frequently annoyed by his mysterious ways and refusal to get involved unless it's dire.
Unnamed Savior
A girl who only wished to become prettier when she got selected as a Savior. Unwilling to learn magic or do her job as the Savior, her magic leaked out as hypnotic charm and built up as a threat to explode in some manner that would the threaten the kingdom. Once the prince finally snapped and stabbed her, her magic caused a meteor strike to happen as God reclaimed her existence.

== Media ==
=== Web novel ===
Written by Kyōka Izumi, The Savior's Book Café Story in Another World was serialized as a web novel on the Pixiv website from October 26 to November 16, 2018.

=== Manga ===
A manga adaptation with composition from Ōmiya and illustrations by Reiko Sakurada, was serialized on Shogakukan's Ura Sunday website and MangaONE app from July 2, 2019, to April 19, 2022. The manga's chapters were compiled into five tankōbon volumes from November 19, 2019, to May 18, 2022. The manga is licensed in North America by Seven Seas Entertainment.

No.	Original release date	Original ISBN	North American release date	North American ISBN
1	November 19, 2019	978-4-09-129483-8	December 21, 2021	978-1-64827-655-2
Chapters 1–6; Bonus: "Tsukina's Routine"
2	May 19, 2020	978-4-09-850117-5	April 19, 2022	978-1-63858-038-6
Chapters 7–12
3	May 19, 2021	978-4-09-850576-0	July 5, 2022	978-1-63858-244-1
Chapters 13–16; Bonus: "The Things You Learn When You're Dating"
4	November 11, 2021	978-4-09-850781-8	November 1, 2022	978-1-63858-731-6
Chapters 17–20; Bonus: "A Place You Can Heartily Rest"
5	May 18, 2022	978-4-09-851114-3	May 16, 2023	978-1-68579-541-2
Chapters 21–26; Bonus: "The Fire of His Eyes"

=== Light novel ===
A light novel version with illustrations by Sakurada was published under Kadokawa Shoten's Kadokawa Beans Bunko light novel imprint. Three volumes were released from June 1, 2020, to December 24, 2021.

No.	Release date	ISBN
1	June 1, 2020	978-4-04-109175-3
2	May 1, 2021	978-4-04-109176-0
3	December 24, 2021	978-4-04-112147-4

== Reception ==
In 2021, the series, alongside An Observation Log of My Fiancée Who Calls Herself a Villainess, won the Isekai Comic Prize at NTT Solmare's Minna ga Erabu!! Denshi Comic Taishō 2021 competition.

By May 2022, the series had over 1 million copies in circulation.
