= List of Unnamed Memory episodes =

- No. of episodes: 24

Release
- Original network: AT-X, Tokyo MX, MBS, BS11
- Original release: April 9, 2024 – March 25, 2025

Unnamed Memory is an anime television series based on the light novel of the same name, whose adaptation was announced on December 13, 2022. It is produced by ENGI, and directed by Kazuya Miura, with scripts written by Deko Akao, character designs handled by Chika Nōmi, and music composed by Akito Matsuda. The series was initially scheduled for 2023, but was later delayed due to "production circumstances", and eventually aired from April 9 to June 25, 2024, on AT-X and other networks. The opening theme song is "Yōbigoe" (呼び声, Call), performed by Tei, while the ending theme song is "blan_", performed by Arika, a music unit composed of voice actress Yūko Natsuyoshi and composer and guitarist Yamato. Crunchyroll streamed the series.

Following the final episode of the first season, a second season was announced, and aired from January 7 to March 25, 2025. The opening theme song is "Unsung ballad", performed by True, while the ending theme song is "inclusion", performed by Arika.

== Series overview ==
Season	Episodes	Originally released	
Season	Episodes	First released	Last released
1	12	April 9, 2024	June 24, 2024
2	12	January 7, 2025	March 25, 2025

== Episodes ==
=== Season 1 (2024) ===
No. overall	No. in season	Title	Directed by (Note: Production staff information is taken from the ending credits of each episode.)	Written by	Storyboarded by	Original release date
1	1	"Cursed Words and the Azure Tower"; Transliteration: "Noroi no Kotoba to Aoi Tō" (Japanese: 呪いの言葉と青い塔)	Marina Maki	Deko Akao	Chihiro Kumano	April 9, 2024
Prince Oscar of Farsas and his assistant Lazar sneak out of the castle and go to an azure tower in the middle of nowhere. Their mission: to meet the Witch of the Azure Moon, who grants a wish to anyone who can reach her at the tower's summit. Oscar then goes through a series of puzzles and challenges as he climbs the tower. Midway through the stairs, it's revealed that the last person ever to successfully reach the top was the prince's great-grandfather, King Regius, around 70 years ago. When the two enter the final room, two demon statues come to life and attack them. Prince Oscar successfully defeats the statues, but the floor beneath them starts to collapse, causing Lazar to fall. The prince enters the room where the witch resides, and he is greeted by the witch, named Tinasha. Tinasha was surprised to hear the prince was related to Regius, and her familiar noted that Lazar was asleep at the bottom of the tower, unharmed. Prince Oscar explains that another powerful witch, the Witch of Silence, placed a curse on him that would kill any woman with whom he tries to have a child and asks Tinasha to lift it. The curse proves to be beyond even Tinasha's ability to break, so she tries to search for a woman strong enough to withstand the curse. Oscar gets Tinasha to admit she could survive the curse, so he changes his wish as the tower's champion from Tinasha breaking the curse to her becoming his wife. Tinasha adamantly refuses, but Oscar persists. Neither side backs down, so Oscar makes a compromise, requesting that Tinasha leave her tower and live with him for one year as his bodyguard. Finding the wish more reasonable, she agrees and returns to Farsas with Oscar and Lazar.
2	2	"The Past Recalled Again"; Transliteration: "Kurikaeshi Furerareru Kako" (Japanese: 繰り返し触れられる過去)	Teru Ishii	Shiomi Takatora	Chihiro Kumano & Nobuhiro Nagata	April 16, 2024
Tinasha moves into the castle, but insists on keeping her identity hidden. As part of her role as protector, she casts a spell on Oscar negating any magical or physical attack on him. While walking in the hallway with Lazar, she finds out that all the prince's cousins went missing, leaving him as the only royal left. While walking in the hallway, she saves Sylvia from a falling chandelier with her magic. After helping Lazar, Tinasha notices General Als and Meredina sword practicing: Tinasha decides to spar with the general and wins. While walking through the castle, one of her familiars, Litola, informs her of a surge of magic power in the magical lake in Druza. She asks permission from Oscar to investigate, but he comes along with a squad of soldiers. Once they arrive at the lake, they find out that a Druza Mage, whose master was beheaded by Tinasha, is trying to release a demonic beast she sealed away 70 years ago. The mage exposes Tinasha as the Witch of the Azure Moon to Oscar's troops before wounding a few of the soldiers and fleeing. Tinasha again asks the prince to let her progress alone: Oscar relents but makes her promise to come back safely. Tinasha fights with the mage and kills him and his followers before they can remove the seal, sparing only one. She then removes the seal herself and fights the beast. Tinasha prevails after a fierce battle, but the beast bites her as she casts her final spell. Her pet dragon carries the wounded witch back to Oscar, who immediately takes her back to Farsas for healing. After some time, the mage noted that Tinasha healed herself, but as a result she aged rapidly and now has the body of an adult.
3	3	"What the Forest Dreams of" Transliteration: "Mori no Miru Yume" (Japanese: 森の見る夢)	Tetsuaki Mata	Tomoko Shinozuka	Chichiro Kumano	April 23, 2024
After petting her familiar, Sylvia caught Tinasha trying to cut her hair, which grew as a result of her rapid aging, with a dagger. After getting over her panic, Sylvia cuts it for her. Oscar introduces Tinasha to his father the king, revealing that she is the Witch of the Azure Moon and declaring his intention to marry her. Two mages, Valt and Miralys, are at the lake where Tinasha slew the demonic beast and take a crystal that the beast dropped after the battle. A mysterious man arrives and tells them that he is trying to find Tinasha and attacks the duo when they try to leave. Valt teleported Miralys to safety leaving him to be vaporized by the man. Oscar and Lazar escape the castle to go to the Byle Forest, where nine villages were found killed by mysterious plants that attacked them. While out in the forest, a plant releases poison that knocks out Lazar, but a mysterious woman arrives and takes him to her cabin for to save him. While there, she introduces herself as Lucrezia, the Witch of the Forbidden Forest and longtime friend of Tinasha. After hearing of Oscar's intention of marrying Tinasha, the witch offers the prince an aphrodisiac to attract her, but he refuses. After returning home, Oscar begins to act strangely, and Tinasha senses something amiss. While she originally thought he simply wasn't getting enough sleep, she figures out that he was cursed by Lucrezia. She then scolded him and told him that she would break her curse when he was asleep. Later that night, Oscar was dreaming of being with Tinasha in bed, only to strangled her to death. Oscar wakes up in a panic, and Tinasha informs him the curse is broken. Oscar, still upset over the dream, tells her he never wants to kill her. Tinasha scolds Lucrezia for cursing her ward, but the older witch apologizes and give her samples of Oscar's body fluids to help with her research into his curse. She also tells her that Oscar cherishes her. Tinasha returns to Oscar's office and apologizes for the trouble Lucrezia caused.
4	4	"A Breath of Life into Image"; Transliteration: "Katachi ni Iki o Fukikomu" (Japanese: 形に息を吹きこむ)	Ryō Miyata	Yoriko Tomita	Toshihiko Masuda	April 30, 2024
Oscar asks Tinasha to spar with him even allowing her to use her magic on him. Kagar, an envoy from the nation of Cuscull arrives and requests an audience the Witch of Azure Moon, but Oscar lies to him that she is not in the castle. While Tinasha is finding Oscar, she meets Oscar's maid Miralys who got the job through her relative General Ettard, then meets with Lucrezia for tea. After calling Tinasha "Lady Aeti", Oscar finally has Tinasha to meet the envoy. The envoy asks her to come to Cuscull and teach the mages there, but Tinasha refuses to help someone who didn't even bother to climb her tower. After meeting Lucrezia in the castle's hallway, it is discovered out that Cuscull is a nation consisting of mages who proclaimed independence. Suddenly, Meredina attacked the three and harshly insults Tinasha, telling her to leave the country. After hearing that, Tinasha becomes gloomy and Oscar comforts her. Lucrezia discovers that Meredina was under mind control. Later, Tinasha teleports Oscar to the tower and asks him to spar her there for a few days after she sends her familiar to Cuscull. One day, after finishing his training, a group of adventurers arrives at the tower. Tinasha tells them that if they defeat Oscar she'll grant them their wish. After defeating the adventurers, Tinasha declares the training complete. Tinasha's familiar returns from Cuscull and tells them that there are around two hundred mages in the nation, more than any other nation, which could mean they are planning a war. Suddenly, news breaks that General Ettard died, and the entire castle gathers to mourn. Miralys kills Kagar after he kills Valth.
5	5	"Unnamed Emotion"; Transliteration: "Mumei no Kanjō" (Japanese: 無名の感情)	Marina Maki	Junko Tomita	Chichiro Kumano	May 7, 2024
Tinasha dreams of her past, where she is being carried by somewhere by a man, only to wake up and find Oscar carrying her to bed after she fell asleep while sitting. Later, the king summons Oscar: Tinasha found out that Miralys is capable of withstanding Oscar's curse, making her a potential bride. Oscar was oblivious to her magic powers and questions her. She reveals her magic was sealed by her mother and Master Kumu. After noticing Tinasha has been missing for a few days, Oscar climbs the tower again to see Tinasha analyzing his curse with Lucrezia. Back at the castle, General Als tells Tinasha that there is no background history for Miralys. Now suspicious of her, she and Als test the young maid, pretending to hug intimately in plain view to see how she reacts, but Oscar also sees this. He calls Tinasha, puts a magic suppressing wristband on her, and carries her to bed, seemingly to force himself on her as punishment. Recalling her dream from earlier, Tinasha gets angry and her magic flares out of control. Oscar immediately calms her down and apologizes, stating that he was only trying to scare her. Knowing Miralys is suspicious, he tells her father that he will only marry Tinasha no matter what happens and calls for a more thorough investigation into Miralys. The maid then and attacks the two, blinding Tinasha's left eye and summoning a smaller version of the demon beast from Druza. Oscar and Tinasha fight the beast and Miralys respectively, but Tinasha decides to cast a stronger spell, forcing Oscar to fend both assailants off to buy her casting time. He kills the beast and Tinasha casts her spell, but Miralys escapes to the treasury, finding what she was looking for. Tinasha binds her with a spell, but Miralys used magic to make her soul disappear, leaving a living but functionless body behind. Tinasha heals her eye and Oscar again apologizes for taking his scare tactic too far.
6	6	"As the Abyss Is Born"; Transliteration: "Shin'en no Umareru Toki" (Japanese: 深淵の生まれる時)	Kiyoshi Murayama	Chika Suzumura	Masaki Ōzora	May 14, 2024
While Oscar sleeps, Tinasha breaks the curse cast upon Oscar, casting an equally powerful curse with the reverse effect so they cancel each other out. The king said thanks to Tinasha and invites her to King Kevin's birthday celebration and diplomatic ball. Lazar delivers a message to Oscar informing him about the king of Cuscull, Lanak, burning down villages and towns near the nation of Tayiri's border. Oscar assumes it's revenge for Tayiri's persecution of mages. Later, Tinasha suddenly asks Oscar to take official ownership her pet dragon Nark. He agrees, and after the transfer, Tinasha kisses him. Tinasha and Oscar attended the ball, where Oscar meets Princess Cecelia of Tayiri, who's attending in place of her brother. The two go to a private room, Oscar wanting to discuss the attack and Cecilia wanting to flirt, but Tinasha arrives, leading him to throw the Princess out. Tinasha weakens Oscar's barrier and warns him of what's about to happen. Lanak, ruler of Cuscull, then appears, and Tinasha declares that she's leaving Oscar to be with him. Oscar decides to visit Lucrezia for advice, only for her to already be at the castle. Gathering his most trusted allies, he asks about Tinasha's past. Lucrezia reveals that Tinasha, whose real name is Tinasha As Meyer Ur Aeterna Tuldarr, has been looking for Lanak ever since she became a witch. She is also royalty of Tuldarr, a nation that was destroyed 400 years ago. Tuldarr chose their royalty based on who had the most magical power, and being the strongest in the land, Tinasha was expected to be the next ruler while Lanak, though the king's son, would only be her consort. Though they loved each other like family, envy and her alignment with a rival political faction led Lanak to turn against her. One night, he and his allies conducted a ritual to kill Tinasha and steal her power for themselves, but her overwhelming magic broke through the ritual and ran wild. A mortally wounded Tinasha managed to regain control of her magic, but not before it destroyed the kingdom. Having become an immortal witch as a result, she built the Tower of Azure Moon on the former land of Tuldarr to live out her days in solitude. Lucrezia then points out that Tinasha was protecting Oscar from Lanak when she weakened his barrier and gave him everything he needed to track her down. Cuscull demands the capitulation of the Four Great Nations after Tinasha is reported to have attacked five large cities. The king demands that Oscar to kill Tinasha, but he refuses, still intent on marrying her. His father relents on the condition that he should ascend the throne, officially making him the new king.
7	7	"The End of the Dream"; Transliteration: "Yume no Owari" (Japanese: 夢の終わり)	Teru Ishii	Chika Suzumura	Teru Ishii	May 21, 2024
8	8	"Green Vines"; Transliteration: "Midori no Tsuru" (Japanese: 緑の蔓)	Masato Jimbo	Tomoko Shinozuka	Chihiro Kumano	May 28, 2024
9	9	"The Things Unknown"; Transliteration: "Wakaranai Koto" (Japanese: 分からないこと)	Yasu Murayama	Shiomi Takatora	Toshihiko Masuda	June 4, 2024
10	10	"Blank Slate Children"; Transliteration: "Hakushi no Kodomo-tachi" (Japanese: 白紙の子供たち)	Yuki Kanazawa	Chika Suzumura	Masaki Ōzora	June 11, 2024
11	11	"Castle of Sand"; Transliteration: "Suna no Oshiro" (Japanese: 砂のお城)	Kiyoshi Murayama	Deko Akao	Shinichi Shōji	June 18, 2024
12	12	"Two Joined Memories"; Transliteration: "Senaka Awase no Kioku" (Japanese: 背中合わせの記憶)	Chihiro Kumano	Deko Akao	Chihiro Kumano & Kazuya Miura	June 24, 2024

=== Season 2 (2025) ===
No. overall	No. in season	Title	Directed by	Written by	Storyboarded by	Original release date
13	1	"From a Blank Page Anew"; Transliteration: "Hakushi Tori Mōichido" (Japanese: 白紙よりもう一度)	Chihiro Kumano	Tomoko Shinozuka	Chihiro Kumano	January 7, 2025
14	2	"Emerging from a Glass Cocoon"; Transliteration: "Garasu no Uka" (Japanese: 硝子の羽化)	Humio Itō	Tomoko Shinozuka	Chihiro Kumano	January 14, 2025
15	3	"Unanswered Prayer"; Transliteration: "Kotae no Nai Inori" (Japanese: 答えの無い祈り)	Kiyoshi Murayama	Chika Suzumura	Chihiro Kumano	January 21, 2025
16	4	"Unseen Visage"; Transliteration: "Mie nai Kao" (Japanese: 見えない貌)	Shin'ichi Fukumoto	Chika Suzumura	Toshiaki Masuda	January 28, 2025
17	5	"Returning the Promise"; Transliteration: "Yakusoku no Ori Kaeshi" (Japanese: 約束の折り返し)	Masato Uchibori	Yoriko Tomita	Chihiro Kumano	February 4, 2025
18	6	"Bloodless Scars"; Transliteration: "Muketsu no Kizuato" (Japanese: 無血の傷跡)	Yoshitaka Nagaoka	Chika Suzumura	Teru Ishii	February 11, 2025
19	7	"Joyful Sorrow"; Transliteration: "Shiawasena Kanashimi" (Japanese: 幸せな悲しみ)	Kiyoshi Murayama	Chika Suzumura	Chihiro Kumano	February 18, 2025
20	8	"Half of Eternity"; Transliteration: "Eien no Hanbun" (Japanese: 永遠の半分)	Shin'ichi Fukumoto	Tomoko Shinozuka	Toshiaki Masuda	February 25, 2025
21	9	"Pride of the Past"; Transliteration: "Kako no Kyōji" (Japanese: 過去の矜持)	Naoki Hishikawa	Chika Suzumura	Chihiro Kumano	March 4, 2025
22	10	"Once upon a Time with You"; Transliteration: "Itsuka no Kimi to" (Japanese: いつかの君と)	Hideaki Ōba	Chika Suzumura	Chihiro Kumano	March 11, 2025
23	11	"At Memory's End"; Transliteration: "Kioku no Hate" (Japanese: 記憶の果て)	Chihiro Kumano & Kazuya Miura	Deko Akao	Chihiro Kumano	March 18, 2025
24	12	"Death of the Nameless Story"; Transliteration: "Na mo Naki Monogatari ni Shūen o" (Japanese: 名も無き物語に終焉を)	Chihiro Kumano & Kazuya Miura	Deko Akao	Chihiro Kumano	March 25, 2025
