= Animazing!!! =

Japanese late-night anime programming block

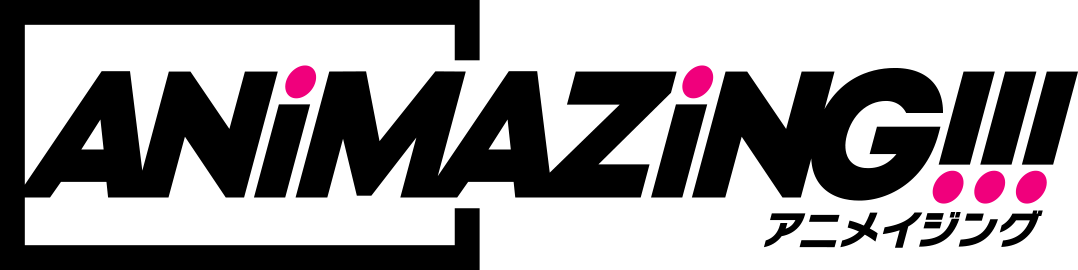
- Network: ABC TV
- Launched: October 4, 2020; 6 years ago
- Division of: ANN
- Country of origin: Japan
- Sister network: TV Asahi
- Running time: Sundays 2:00-2:30 (JST)
- Original language: Japanese
- Official website: Official website

Animazing!!! (Japanese: アニメイジング, Hepburn: Animeijingu), stylized as ANiMAZiNG!!!, is a Japanese late-night anime programming block planned and produced by ABC Animation, a subsidiary of the Asahi Broadcasting Group Holdings (via production committee participation), and is launched in October 2020 by ABC TV with TV Asahi under the All-Nippon News Network affiliation. The block airs on Saturday nights from 26:00 to 26:30 JST (effectively Sunday mornings from 2:00 to 2:30 JST).

== History ==
The programming block was conceptualized when a single half-hour slot of late-night anime programming was broadcast in the October 2020 reorganization. In the same month, NUMAnimation, which originally aired locally on TV Asahi in the Kanto region, was expanded to other affiliate stations, thus becoming an hour-long anime slot on the ANN network.

The name of the frame is a combination of the words "anime" and "Amazing", with the message of "Amazing anime from this block". The slogan of the block is "An anime frame that jumps out of the frame!".

As an anime programming block produced by ABC, it went on to air on the network after the 8:30 a.m. Sunday anime programming (currently Pretty Cure) produced by the same station, and is the first late-night anime programming broadcast in 14 years since Glass Fleet. The "Anisata!!!" block was renamed to "Animazing²!!!" and began airing 20 minutes later than it did originally. As a result, an anime broadcasting slot of 1 hour and 30 minutes was formed in accordance with the Sunday morning time zone (Saturday midnight), and it is the first time in history that the network broadcasts three different anime blocks. Subtitle broadcasting is implemented in the NUMAnimation block, but is not implemented in this block.

When a network station is suspended due to special programs or maintenance of broadcasting equipment, the station responds with a delayed network, for example, before dawn the next day.

During the summer season, broadcasting time may be significantly reduced or suspended in conjunction with NUMAnimation, due to the Nekuto Koshien High School baseball recap program (produced by ABC, except when canceled due to rain) and live sports broadcasts.

== Titles ==
No.	Title	Start date	End date	Eps.	Studio	Notes	Ref.
1	Iwa-Kakeru! Climbing Girls	October 4, 2020; July 7, 2024 (rerun)	December 20, 2020; September 29, 2024 (rerun)	12	Blade	Based on the manga series by Ryūdai Ishizaka.	
2	SK8 the Infinity	January 10, 2021	April 4, 2021	12	Bones	Original work.	
3	Pretty Boy Detective Club	April 11, 2021	June 27, 2021	12	Shaft	Based on the Bishonen Series novels by Nisio Isin and Kinako.	
4	The Great Jahy Will Not Be Defeated!	August 1, 2021	December 19, 2021	20	Silver Link	Based on the manga series by Wakame Konbu.	
5	Miss Kuroitsu from the Monster Development Department	January 9, 2022	April 3, 2022	12	Quad	Based on the manga series by Hiroaki Mizusaki.	
6	Shikimori's Not Just a Cutie	April 10, 2022	July 10, 2022	12	Doga Kobo	Based on the manga series by Keigo Maki.	
7	The Maid I Hired Recently Is Mysterious	July 24, 2022	October 9, 2022	11	Silver Link; Blade	Based on the manga series by Wakame Konbu.	
8	The Little Lies We All Tell	October 16, 2022	December 25, 2022	11	Studio Flad	Based on the manga series by Madoka Kashihara.	
9	Saving 80,000 Gold in Another World for My Retirement	January 8, 2023	March 26, 2023	12	Felix Film	Based on the light novel series by FUNA and Tōzai.	
10	Summoned to Another World for a Second Time	April 9, 2023	June 25, 2023	12	Studio Elle	Based on the light novel series by Kazuha Kishimoto and 40hara.	
11	Am I Actually the Strongest?	July 2, 2023	October 1, 2023	12	Staple Entertainment	Based on the light novel series by Sai Sumimori and Ai Takahashi.	
12	I Shall Survive Using Potions!	October 8, 2023	December 24, 2023	12	Jumondou	Based on the light novel series by FUNA and Sukima.	
13	The Strongest Tank's Labyrinth Raids	January 7, 2024	March 24, 2024	12	Studio Polon	Based on the light novel series by Ryūta Kijima and Sando.	
14	Tonari no Yōkai-san	April 7, 2024	June 30, 2024	13	Liden Films	Based on the manga series by noho.	
15	The Healer Who Was Banished From His Party, Is, in Fact, the Strongest	October 6, 2024	December 22, 2024	12	Studio Elle	Based on the light novel series by Kagekinoko and Kakao Lanthanum.	
16	Witchy Pretty Cure!! Mirai Days	January 12, 2025	March 30, 2025	12	Toei Animation; Studio Deen	Sequel to Witchy Pretty Cure!.	
17	I'm the Evil Lord of an Intergalactic Empire!	April 6, 2025	June 22, 2025	12	Quad	Based on the light novel series by Yomu Mishima and Nadare Takamine.	
18	Shūkan Ranobe Anime	July 13, 2025	September 28, 2025	12	Ziine Studio	Based on four original stories by popular light novel authors (Nigojū, Hyūganatsu, Tappei Nagatsuki and Shōko Amano).	
19	Sound! Euphonium	October 5, 2025	December 28, 2025	13	Kyoto Animation	Based on the novels by Ayano Takeda and Nikki Asada. Rebroadcast of the first season.	
20	A Misanthrope Teaches a Class for Demi-Humans	January 11, 2026	April 5, 2026	13	Asread	Based on the light novel series by Natsume Kurusu and Sai Izumi.	
21	Ichijyoma Mankitsu Gurashi!	April 12, 2026	June 21, 2026	11	PRA	Based on the manga series by Kumako Hisama.	
22	Hanaori-san Still Wants to Fight in the Next Life	July 12, 2026	September 26, 2026	12	Liden Films	Based on the manga series by Hekiru Hikawa.	
23	Dreamland	October 18, 2026	TBA	10	Ellipse Animation; La Chouette Compagnie	Based on the French comic book series by Reno Lemaire. Japanese dub.	
24	Wound & Bandage	January 10, 2027	TBA	TBA	J.C.Staff	Based on the manga series by Umihoshi Nanai.	
25	Glasses with a Chance of Delinquent	April 2027	TBA	TBA	Studio Flad; Wao World	Based on the manga series by Naruki.	

== See also ==
- Late-night anime programming blocks in Japan
- Other anime programming blocks by ANN
  - NUMAnimation, airing on Sunday mornings
  - IMAnimation, airing on Saturday evenings, and Wednesday evenings on the IMAnimation W block
