= Shūkan Ranobe Anime =

Japanese anime television series

- Key visual

週刊ラノべアニメ
- Created by: Nigojū (Shōshin Time Leap); Hyūganatsu (Femme Fatale Ikusei Keikaku); Tappei Nagatsuki (Jack the Reaper); Shōko Amano (Marie Antoinette ni Tensei Shita node, Zenryoku de Guillotine wo Kaihi Shimasu)
- Anime television series

Shōshin Time Leap / Femme Fatale Ikusei Keikaku / Jack the Reaper / Marie Antoinette ni Tensei Shita node, Zenryoku de Guillotine wo Kaihi Shimasu
- Directed by: Tomoyasu Murata (Shōshin Time Leap); Masayuki Kitamura (Femme Fatale Ikusei Keikaku); Kazuya Shiraishi (Femme Fatale Ikusei Keikaku); Daisuke Nakano (Jack the Reaper); Kaoruko Murakami (Marie Antoinette ni Tensei Shita node, Zenryoku de Guillotine wo Kaihi Shimasu)
- Written by: Nigojū (Shōshin Time Leap); Hyūganatsu (Femme Fatale Ikusei Keikaku); Ougyo Kawagishi (Femme Fatale Ikusei Keikaku); Usagi Usaki (Jack the Reaper); Shōko Amano (Marie Antoinette ni Tensei Shita node, Zenryoku de Guillotine wo Kaihi Shimasu)
- Music by: Misaki Umase
- Studio: Ziine Studio
- Original network: ANN (ABC TV, TV Asahi)
- Original run: July 13, 2025 – September 28, 2025
- Episodes: 12

Shūkan Ranobe Anime (週刊ラノべアニメ; lit. 'Weekly Light Novel Anime') is a Japanese anime television series produced by Ziine Studio, which adapts four original stories by popular light novel authors and illustrators.

The stories include:

- Shōshin Time Leap (傷心タイムリープ, Shōshin Taimurīpu; lit. 'Heartbreak Time Leap') by Nigojū with character designs by tanu;
- Femme Fatale Ikusei Keikaku (ファムファタル育成計画, Famufataru Ikusei Keikaku; lit. 'Femme Fatale Raising Project') by Hyūganatsu with character designs by Kamoku Okeno;
- Jack the Reaper by Tappei Nagatsuki with character designs by Minori Chigusa;
- Marie Antoinette ni Tensei Shita node, Zenryoku de Guillotine o Kaihi Shimasu (マリー・アントワネットに転生したので全力でギロチンを回避します, Marī Antowanetto ni Tensei Shita node, Zenryoku de Girochin o Kaihi Shimasu; lit. 'Reborn as Marie Antoinette, I'll Give it My All to Avoid the Guillotine') by Shōko Amano with character designs by Takuya Fujima.

The series aired from July 13 to September 28, 2025, on the Animazing!!! programming block on all ANN affiliates, including ABC TV and TV Asahi. (Note: ABC TV and TV Asahi listed the series premiere on July 12, 2025, at 26:00, which is effectively July 13 at 2:00 a.m. JST.) The opening theme song is "Hajimari no Aizu" (Hajimariの合図; Signal of a Start), performed by Chihaya Yoshitake, while the ending theme song is "Gunjō to Mikan no Kanata" (群青と未完の彼方; Ultramarine and Incomplete Beyond), performed by Ayaka Nanase.

== Characters ==
=== Shōshin Time Leap ===
Miri Wakana (若菜美梨, Wakana Miri)
Voiced by: Tomoyo Takayanagi
Takashi Wase (和瀬樹, Wase Takashi)
Voiced by: Shogo Sakata
Miyako Anami (阿南都, Anami Miyako)
Voiced by: Miyari Nemoto
Ren Ashiya (芦屋蓮, Ashiya Ren)
Voiced by: Reiji Kawashima

=== Femme Fatale Ikusei Keikaku ===
Hiroki Adagawa (阿多川祐樹, Adagawa Hiroki)
Voiced by: Daiki Yamashita
Yamada (山田)
Voiced by: Yūya Hirose
Suzuki (鈴木)
Voiced by: Yusuke Shirai
Kazane Kurahashi (倉橋 華実, Kurahashi Kazane)
Voiced by: Saho Shirasu
Tsukino Kurahashi (倉橋 月乃, Kurahashi Tsukino)
Voiced by: Satsumi Matsuda
Yukiko Kurahashi (倉橋 雪子, Kurahashi Yukiko)
Voiced by: Reina Kondō
Asagi Hiyama (緋山 あさぎ, Hiyama Asagi)
Voiced by: Sayumi Suzushiro
Narrator (ナレーション, Narēshon)
Voiced by: Tatsumaru Tachibana

=== Jack the Reaper ===
Gokurō Tokishiro (時城獄狼, Tokishiro Gokurō)
Voiced by: Kaito Ishikawa
Komachi Nadazaka (涙坂小町, Nadazaka Komachi)
Voiced by: Kaede Hondo
Hayato Yazukibaya (矢継早速人, Yazukibaya Hayato)
Voiced by: Kento Hama
Iwao Kendō (権藤岩生, Kendō Iwao)
Voiced by: Hinata Tadokoro
Mirei Jūmanishi (十万石美麗, Jūmanishi Mirei)
Voiced by: Nanako Mori

=== Marie Antoinette ni Tensei Shita node, Zenryoku de Guillotine wo Kaihi Shimasu ===
Antoinette (アントワネット, Antowanetto)
Voiced by: Fairouz Ai
Louis (ルイ, Rui)
Voiced by: Toshiki Masuda
Charles (スタニスラス, Sutanisurasu)
Voiced by: Shun'ichi Toki
Stanislas (シャルル, Sharuru)
Voiced by: Takeo Ōtsuka
Madame du Barry (デュ・バリー夫人, Deyu Barī Fujin)
Voiced by: Masumi Tazawa
