= Uzaki-chan Wants to Hang Out! =

Japanese manga series

- First tankōbon volume cover, featuring Hana Uzaki

宇崎ちゃんは遊びたい！ (Uzaki-chan wa Asobitai!)
- Genre: Romantic comedy; Slice of life
- Manga
- Written by: Take
- Published by: Fujimi Shobo
- English publisher: NA: Seven Seas Entertainment
- Imprint: Dragon Comics Age
- Magazine: Niconico Seiga (Dra Dra Sharp)
- Original run: December 1, 2017 – present
- Volumes: 15
- Anime television series
- Directed by: Kazuya Miura
- Written by: Takashi Aoshima
- Music by: Satoshi Igarashi
- Studio: ENGI
- Licensed by: Crunchyroll (Note: In North America through Crunchyroll, LLC (formerly known as Funimation).)
- Original network: AT-X, Tokyo MX, BS11, ABC, TVA, BSS, NCC
- English network: US: Crunchyroll Channel
- Original run: July 10, 2020 – December 24, 2022
- Episodes: 25
- icon

Uzaki-chan Wants to Hang Out! (Japanese: 宇崎ちゃんは遊びたい！, Hepburn: Uzaki-chan wa Asobitai!; lit. 'Uzaki-chan Wants to Play!') is a Japanese manga series written and illustrated by Take. It has been serialized through Niconico Seiga's Dra Dra Sharp website since December 2017 and collected in 15 tankōbon volumes by Fujimi Shobo as of November 2026. In North America, the manga is licensed by Seven Seas Entertainment. An anime television series adaptation produced by ENGI aired on AT-X from July to September 2020. A second season aired from October to December 2022. The story follows Hana Uzaki, a college student thrilled to attend the same college as her upperclassman, Shinichi Sakurai. However, she becomes concerned by his loner lifestyle and decides to spend time with him.

== Synopsis ==
Hana Uzaki is thrilled to discover that she is attending the same college as her fellow high school upperclassman, Shinichi Sakurai. However, after a year of watching him just laze around, she comes to the conclusion that he has turned into a loner. She decides to spend as much time with Shinichi as possible, believing that he is an introvert or intimidating, considering him uncool and unacceptable. With the intention to expose Shinichi to a more fun lifestyle, Hana closely follows him like a persistent presence, creating conflicts between Shinichi's desire to spend time alone and Hana's enthusiastic and outgoing personality.

== Characters ==
Hana Uzaki (宇崎 花, Uzaki Hana)
Voiced by: Naomi Ōzora (Japanese); Monica Rial (English)
A second-year college student who attends the same college as Shinichi. Despite her curvaceous figure, (Note: The "Sugoi Dekai" on her shirt is a Japanese joke. The phrase is used equivalently to the English "awesome", "fantastic", or "great", but it has the literal meaning "so big".) Hana is sometimes mistaken as an elementary school student because she is petite. A cheerful, beautiful and outgoing student, she is frustrated Shinichi spent his college days mostly alone during her first-year at college. She decides to help him get out of his loner lifestyle by accompanying him wherever he goes, much to Shinichi's annoyance and embarrassment. As the time passes, Hana starts to develop feelings for Shinichi, but she strongly refuses to acknowledge this.
Shinichi Sakurai (桜井 真一, Sakurai Shin'ichi)
Voiced by: Kenji Akabane (Japanese); Ricco Fajardo (Note: David Matranga filled in for Fajardo as Shinichi in episode 13.) (English)
A third-year college student who is Hana's upperclassman. The two of them first met when they were members of the swimming club during high school. Most female students are afraid to approach him due to his intimidating appearance. While Shinichi is often annoyed by Hana's antics, especially those which are at his expense, he tolerates them as long as she is having fun during her college life. Eventually, he falls in love with Hana, but he does not want to admit it. He works part-time at a café near their college and is popular among the customers because of his athletic physique and work ethic.
Ami Asai (亜細 亜実, Asai Ami)
Voiced by: Ayana Taketatsu (Japanese); Jad Saxton (English)
A fourth-year college student who attends the same college as Shinichi and Hana. She works at her father's café. Like her father, she watches Shinichi and Hana from afar to see if their relationship will progress further. She has a muscle fetish towards Shinichi since the first day he worked at the café.
Itsuhito Sakaki (榊 逸仁, Sakaki Itsuhito)
Voiced by: Tomoya Takagi (Japanese); Nazeeh Tarsha (English)
Shinichi's friend at the college he attends. He is good at sports and popular among young women at the college. When he finds out that Shinichi and Hana often hang out together, Sakaki joins forces with Ami so that he can help the two advance their relationship to the next level.
The Master (マスター, Masutā)
Voiced by: Yōsuke Akimoto (Japanese); Kent Williams (English)
Shinichi's boss at the café he works at, his real name is Akihiko Asai (亜細 亜紀彦, Asai Akihiko). He is also Ami's father. Knowing that Hana often visits Shinichi whenever he works at the café, he decides to watch both of them from afar with his daughter, wondering if their relationship will advance to the next level.
Tsuki Uzaki (宇崎 月, Uzaki Tsuki)
Voiced by: Saori Hayami (Japanese); Terri Doty (English)
Hana's mother. She considers Shinichi's appearance to be scary from the day she met him and mistakenly thinks that Shinichi has taken an interest in her since the day he visited the house, not knowing that he only wanted to pet Hana's cats.
Yanagi Uzaki (宇崎 柳, Uzaki Yanagi)
Voiced by: Seina Kato (Japanese); Brittany Lauda (English)
Hana's younger sister. She is in her second year of junior high. She likes to play video games and tease her siblings and parents. She has bangs that cover her eyes.
Kiri Uzaki (宇崎 桐, Uzaki Kiri)
Voiced by: Yūko Sanpei (Japanese); Hayden Daviau (English)
Hana's younger brother. He is a member of the swimming club at his school, though he is not as good at it as Hana and Shinichi are.
Fujio Uzaki (宇崎 不二夫, Uzaki Fujio)
Voiced by: Hideo Ishikawa (Japanese); Matthew David Rudd (English)
Hana's father. Despite his overwhelming protectiveness of his children, he greatly respects Shinichi.
Haruko Sakurai (桜井 春子, Sakurai Haruko)
Voiced by: Miki Itō (Japanese); Morgan Lauré Garrett (English)
Shinichi's mother.
Shirō Sakurai (桜井 志郎, Sakurai Shirō)
Voiced by: Tomokazu Sugita (Japanese); Cris George (English)
Shinichi's father.
Nodoka Sakurai (桜井 のどか, Sakurai Nodoka)
Voiced by: Reina Nagao
Shinichi's baby sister. She was born while Shinichi was away in college; as such, he was not aware that he even had a baby sister.

== Media ==
=== Manga ===
Uzaki-chan Wants to Hang Out! is written and illustrated by Take. It began serialization through Niconico Seiga's Dra Dra Sharp website on December 1, 2017. The series has been compiled into individual tankōbon volumes. The first volume was published on July 9, 2018. As of November 9, 2026, 15 volumes have been published. In North America, the series is licensed by Seven Seas Entertainment, who began publishing it in English on September 17, 2019. Kadokawa published an anthology of the series on December 8, 2023.

==== Volumes ====
| No. | Original release date | Original ISBN | English release date | English ISBN |
|---|---|---|---|---|
| 1 | July 9, 2018 | 978-4-04-072779-0 | September 17, 2019 | 978-1-64275-336-3 |
Chapters 1–13; Extra (特別編, Tokubetsu-hen)
| 2 | February 8, 2019 | 978-4-04-073095-0 | January 14, 2020 | 978-1-64505-193-0 |
Chapters 14–23; Extra (特別編, Tokubetsu-hen)
| 3 | July 9, 2019 | 978-4-04-073260-2 | June 16, 2020 (digital); July 14, 2020 (physical) | 978-1-64505-484-9 |
Chapters 24–33; Extra (特別編, Tokubetsu-hen)
| 4 | February 7, 2020 | 978-4-04-073499-6 | December 8, 2020 | 978-1-64505-817-5 |
Chapters 34–42; Extra 1 (特別編 1, Tokubetsu-hen 1); Extra 2 (特別編 2, Tokubetsu-hen 2)
| 5 | July 9, 2020 | 978-4-04-073712-6; 978-4-04-073713-3 (SE) | May 11, 2021 | 978-1-64827-215-8 |
Chapters 43–51; Extra (特別編, Tokubetsu-hen)
| 6 | March 9, 2021 | 978-4-04-074013-3 | December 14, 2021 | 978-1-64827-389-6 |
Chapters 52–61; Extra (特別編, Tokubetsu-hen)
| 7 | August 6, 2021 | 978-4-04-074205-2 | May 31, 2022 | 978-1-63858-249-6 |
Chapters 62–69; Extra (特別編, Tokubetsu-hen)
| 8 | March 9, 2022 | 978-4-04-074458-2 | December 13, 2022 | 978-1-63858-848-1 |
Chapters 70–77; Extra (特別編, Tokubetsu-hen)
| 9 | September 9, 2022 | 978-4-04-074675-3 | June 20, 2023 | 978-1-68579-535-1 |
Chapters 78–85; Extra (特別編, Tokubetsu-hen)
| 10 | March 9, 2023 | 978-4-04-074907-5 | December 19, 2023 | 979-8-88843-082-8 |
Chapters 86–93; Extra (特別編, Tokubetsu-hen)
| 11 | December 8, 2023 | 978-4-04-075236-5 | July 9, 2024 | 979-8-88843-803-9 |
Chapters 94–102; Extra (特別編, Tokubetsu-hen)
| 12 | July 9, 2024 | 978-4-04-075514-4 | February 18, 2025 | 979-8-89373-257-3 |
Chapters 103–111; Extra (特別編, Tokubetsu-hen)
| 13 | March 7, 2025 | 978-4-04-075831-2 | November 11, 2025 | 979-8-89561-734-2 |
Chapters 112–120; Extra (特別編, Tokubetsu-hen)
| 14 | January 9, 2026 | 978-4-04-076236-4 | July 21, 2026 | 979-8-89765-376-8 |
Chapters 121–129; Extra (特別編, Tokubetsu-hen)
| 15 | November 9, 2026 | 978-4-04-076626-3 | — | — |
Chapters 130–142; Extra (特別編, Tokubetsu-hen)

=== Anime ===
An anime television series adaptation was announced by Kadokawa on February 3, 2020. The series was animated by ENGI and directed by Kazuya Miura, with Takashi Aoshima handling series composition, Manabu Kurihara designing the characters, and Satoshi Igarashi composing the music. It ran for 12 episodes on AT-X and other channels from July 10 to September 25, 2020. The opening theme, "Nadamesukashi Negotiation" (なだめスかし Negotiation, Nadamesukashi Negoshiēshon; "Negotiation by Comforting"), was performed by Kano and Naomi Ōzora (performing as her character, Hana Uzaki), while the ending theme, "Kokoro Knock" (ココロノック, Kokoro Nokku; "Heart Knock"), was performed by YuNi.

On July 3, 2020, Funimation announced at FunimationCon that they had acquired the series, and would stream it on its website in North America and the British Isles, and on AnimeLab in Australia and New Zealand. On September 10, 2020, Funimation announced that the series would receive an English dub, which premiered the following day. After Sony acquired Crunchyroll, the series was moved to the streaming service.

On September 25, 2020, shortly after the first season's finale aired, it was announced that a second season had been greenlit for production. The second season, titled Uzaki-chan Wants to Hang Out! ω, (Note: The ω in the title is pronounced as "double".) aired from October 1 to December 24, 2022. Kano and Naomi Ōzora, as her character, Hana Uzaki, performed the opening theme "Ichigo Ichie Celebration" (いちごいちえCelebration; "Once-in-a-Lifetime Celebration"), while MKLNtic performed the ending theme "Happy Life" (はっぴーらいふ, Happī Raifu).

==== Episodes ====
===== Season 1 (2020) =====
| Story | Episode | Title (Note: All English titles are taken from Funimation.) | Original release date |
|---|---|---|---|
| 1 | 1 | "Uzaki-chan Wants to Hang Out!"; Transliteration: "Uzaki-chan wa Asobitai!" (Japanese: 宇崎ちゃんは遊びたい！) | July 10, 2020 |
Hana Uzaki decides to cure Shinichi Sakurai of his loneliness. They go see the film, try virtual reality, where he accidentally fondles her breast, she hurts her back while batting baseball, eats from his plate at the restaurant, and constantly embarrasses him.
| 2 | 2 | "The Café Owner Wants a Glimpse!"; Transliteration: "Masutā wa Kaimamitai!" (Japanese: マスターは垣間見たい！) | July 17, 2020 |
Hana happens to pass by the café where Shinichi works. He tells her to leave, but she insists on being properly treated as a customer. Hana gets stuck in bushes after trying to catch a stray cat to cheer up Shinichi, who ends up in an embarrassing situation. Later, she is shocked to learn he has a friend he is having lunch with and keeps texting him. That evening, she shows up at the café to ask Shinichi to help her with a written report. She then asks to sleep at his place because it is close to campus, much to his shock and the café owner's amusement.
| 3 | 3 | "The Asai Family Wants to Look Out for Us!"; Transliteration: "Asai Oyako wa Mimamoritai!" (Japanese: 亜細親子は見守りたい！) | July 24, 2020 |
Ami Asai, the café owner's daughter and Shinichi's senior, meets Hana. After an incident the day before, Shinichi is sick, and Hana shows up at his place to take care of him. To celebrate Shinichi's recovery, the four of them eat out, but Hana gets jealous when Shinichi calls Ami by her first name. On campus, Hana tries to hypnotize Shinichi into calling her by her first name.
| 4 | 4 | "I Want to Hang Out Together Over the Holiday!"; Transliteration: "Renkyū wa Issho ni Asobitai!" (Japanese: 連休は一緒に遊びたい！) | July 31, 2020 |
During Golden Week, Shinichi plays video games for three straight days. Hana then shows up, and they decide to go out and play Doramon Go together. Later, they run into Ami while buying glasses. On a crowded train, Shinichi gets self-conscious standing next to Hana, so he goes past his stop. At the café, Ami tells Shinichi to follow up with Hana. When Shinichi arrives on campus, he agrees to hang out with Hana the following weekend. A week later, they spend the whole day hanging out together.
| 5 | 5 | "I Want to Meddle in My Friend's Business!"; Transliteration: "Shin'yū ni Osekkai Shitai!" (Japanese: 親友におせっかいしたい！) | August 7, 2020 |
Hana teases Shinichi after he wakes from a nightmare in class, but he gets revenge later on. Shinichi's friend, Itsuhito Sakaki, meddles in their relationship, which upsets Ami. Later, Hana berates Shinichi about chocolate mint.
| 6 | 6 | "Summer! The Beach! I Want to Test My Courage!"; Transliteration: "Natsuda! Umida! Ki mo Dame Shitai!" (Japanese: 夏だ！海だ！きもだめしたい！) | August 14, 2020 |
Hana is hired at the café, much to Shinichi's annoyance. She then drags him to the beach to keep him from spending summer break holed up. Ami and Sakaki join them, and they play an awkward blindfolded watermelon-splitting game. Later that night, they take part in a test of courage with unforeseen consequences. Afterward, Hana teases a sleeping Shinichi.
| 7 | 7 | "I Want to Hang Out at a Cat Café and a Pub!"; Transliteration: "Neko Kafe to Izakaya de Asobitai!" (Japanese: 猫カフェと居酒屋で遊びたい！) | August 21, 2020 |
Hana receives a call from Shinichi, who tells her he needs to see her. When they meet, she finds out he wants her to come with him to a cat café, much to her annoyance. After they hang out there, Hana tells Shinichi that her birthday is coming up. At the café, he wonders what he should get her. Later, while he is out looking for a present, Shinichi receives a call from Hana telling him to meet her. When he arrives at her location, they head to a pub. Inside, Hana orders a lot of alcohol. Afterward, Shinichi takes an inebriated Hana to his place where she teases him. The next day, Hana has a hangover.
| 8 | 8 | "I Want to Watch Fireworks Together!"; Transliteration: "Futari de Hanabi o Miagetai!" (Japanese: 二人で花火を見上げたい！) | August 28, 2020 |
Hana apologizes to Shinichi about ruining his futon while drunk, causing an embarrassing misunderstanding among onlookers. Later at the café, the owner gives Shinichi a voucher for a fireworks festival, while Ami advises him about Hana, who is still mortified about the incident. Hana accidentally knocks out Shinichi after he tries too hard to cheer her up, and he reminisces about their high school days. Upon waking, he reminisces with her about everything they have done together since entering college.
| 9 | 9 | "Tsuki Uzaki Wants a Thrill?"; Transliteration: "Uzaki Tsuki wa Tokimekitai?" (Japanese: 宇崎月はときめきたい？) | September 4, 2020 |
Tsuki Uzaki, Hana's mother, meets Shinichi for the first time. She then misinterprets his desire to pet one of Hana's cats as him being interested in her. At the café, Tsuki shows up to watch Hana work, only to find out Shinichi is working there too. After the misunderstanding involving Shinichi seems to clear up, she misinterprets the situation again when she hears him and Hana talking. Later, Hana begins acting more like her mother after Shinichi inadvertently insulted her. After he apologizes, they argue, and a young customer gives them a lottery ticket so they can make up. When they use the ticket, they win a trip to Tottori.
| 10 | 10 | "I Want to Hang Out in Tottori!"; Transliteration: "Tottori de Asobitai!" (Japanese: 鳥取で遊びたい!) | September 11, 2020 |
Hana and Shinichi are in Tottori when they run into Sakaki and Ami. It is then revealed that Sakaki and Ami have teamed up to help Hana and Shinichi's relationship reach the next level. As they are touring, Hana and Shinichi notice the same couple along the way. When they arrive at Hakuto Shrine, Sakaki and Ami tell Hana and Shinichi that Tottori is famous as a destination for couples, much to their chagrin. After a brief period of unease, Hana and Shinichi enjoy themselves the next day. Meanwhile, someone walking by catches Sakaki and Ami's attention.
| 11 | 11 | "Does Sakurai Want to Hang Out Too?"; Transliteration: "Sakurai mo Asobitai?" (Japanese: 桜井も遊びたい?) | September 18, 2020 |
When Hana arrives at Shinichi's place, he complains until she reveals she plans to cook a meal. At the café, when Shinichi is put in charge of food prep, his cooking is a disaster. Later, Hana and Tsuki teach Shinichi how to cook. Tsuki misinterprets Hana and Shinichi's conversation again. Afterward, Hana and Shinichi hang out at a rock climbing gym. Sometime later, Hana and Ami run into Shinichi at a karaoke bar. The following day, a despondent Hana tells Shinichi that she cannot hang out with him anymore.
| 12 | 12 | "Uzaki-chan Wants to Hang Out More!"; Transliteration: "Uzaki-chan wa Motto Asobitai!" (Japanese: 宇崎ちゃんはもっと遊びたい！) | September 25, 2020 |
Hana reveals she cannot hang out with Shinichi anymore because she forgot to do her summer break homework. At the café, when the café owner injures his back, Ami temporarily takes over as manager. While Shinichi and the café owner are at the chiropractic clinic, Hana reminisces about how she and Shinichi first met. After Hana asks everyone at the café what Shinichi is like when he is drunk, Hana and Shinichi have a drinking party later that night. The next morning, they realize they slept in the same futon. At the café, they struggle to remember what happened. After summer break, Hana and Shinichi return to campus, where he tells her they will always be together whenever they hang out.

===== Season 2: ω (2022) =====
| Story | Episode | Title (Note: All English titles are taken from Crunchyroll.) | Original release date |
|---|---|---|---|
| 13 | 1 | "Uzaki-chan Wants to Hang Out, All Right!"; Transliteration: "Uzaki-chan wa Yappari Asobitai!" (Japanese: 宇崎ちゃんはやっぱり遊びたい！) | October 1, 2022 |
When Hana becomes depressed because summer break is over, Sakaki cheers her up after they talk about Shinichi. They decide to go bowling, and knowing Shinichi is bad at it, Hana proposes a penalty game and uses underhanded tactics to throw him off. Another day, the café is closed, and Ami takes the opportunity to make Hana and Shinichi try on new sexy uniforms. On campus, Shinichi is sleepy from playing video games with Hana into the wee hours of the morning. She later finds him napping between classes and falls asleep next to him, unaware of the crowd forming around them.
| 14 | 2 | "I Want to Make Udon After We Hang Out!"; Transliteration: "Asonda Ato wa Udon o Uchitai!" (Japanese: 遊んだあとはうどんを打ちたい！) | October 8, 2022 |
Sakaki shows pictures of Hana and Shinichi napping together on campus to Ami. The four go clothes shopping, and Hana tells Ami she has been swimming with Shinichi, who complimented her bathing suit. Later, they play futsal and meet Sakaki's acquaintances, who challenge him to a game. Another day, Hana daydreams that she is Shinichi's upperclassman as they head to her house. After Tsuki teaches Shinichi how to make udon, he gets good at it, but Hana gives him harsh criticism. As Shinichi practices cutting the noodles properly, Tsuki still misinterprets his motivations, and a conversation with Hana only worsens the misunderstanding. That evening, Hana's younger brother, Kiri, eagerly eats the udon prepared by Hana's senpai, whom he erroneously believes is a woman.
| 15 | 3 | "Does Uzaki-chan Want to Go to the School Festival?"; Transliteration: "Uzaki-chan wa Gakusai ni Ikitai?" (Japanese: 宇崎ちゃんは学祭に行きたい？) | October 15, 2022 |
Sakaki convinces Hana and Shinichi to attend the college festival, bribing them with a chance to win a video game console in a lottery. On the first day of the festival, they actually have fun together and decide to have their fortunes read at the Occult Club's stand. They try to leave when they discover the stand only tells romantic fortunes, but they're forced to comply. Shinichi is left emotionally shaken after he hears their fortune. Later, Hana prepares a meal for Shinichi and herself. She concludes, in a self-absorbed thought process, that he needs her around and tries unsuccessfully to get him to say it.
| 16 | 4 | "Uzaki-chan Wants to Be Number One!"; Transliteration: "Uzaki-chan wa Maunto Toritai!" (Japanese: 宇崎ちゃんはマウントとりたい！) | October 22, 2022 |
Annoyed that Hana and Shinichi's relationship has not moved forward, Ami and Sakaki decide to shake Hana out of her confidence by telling her she might lose Shinichi to other women if she lets her guard down. While teaching Shinichi to cook croquettes at her house, Hana is still bothered by her conversation with Sakaki. Meanwhile, her mother once again misinterprets Shinichi's intentions when he asks what her first name is. The croquettes turn out really good though.
| 17 | 5 | "The Whole Uzaki Clan Wants to Get Together!"; Transliteration: "Uzaki Ikka wa Seizoroi Shitai!" (Japanese: 宇崎一家は勢揃いしたい！) | October 29, 2022 |
Hana is upset that Shinichi calls other women by their first name but not her. Shinichi gets a free trial coupon for a gym and meets a trainer named Fujio. At the Uzaki household, it is revealed that Fujio is none other than Hana's father. He calls a family meeting when he finds out that her senpai, whom he assumed was female, is actually a guy. The situation escalates when Hana defends Shinichi to her father and younger siblings. Kiri is dismayed to learn that the maker of the udon he enjoyed is male, while the youngest daughter, Yanagi, is highly amused. Meanwhile, Shinichi tries to sweat out his Hana-induced inner turmoil.
| 18 | 6 | "Uzaki-chan Wants to Celebrate!"; Transliteration: "Uzaki-chan wa Oiwai Shitai!" (Japanese: 宇崎ちゃんはお祝いしたい！) | November 5, 2022 |
At the gym, Fujio shares his worries with Shinichi and two other regulars about his daughter having a boyfriend. Since Shinichi spends so much time training, Hana feels neglected and reiterates that he likes her in response to Yanagi's teasing. The next day, still under the delusion that Shinichi has feelings for her, Tsuki spends time at the café and leaves him alone with Hana for his cooking lesson, hoping their relationship develops. Later, she bumps into him on her way back home and erroneously believes he and Hana had sex. On November 2, the Uzakis celebrate Tsuki's birthday; on November 29, Hana spends time with Shinichi for his 21st birthday, and he privately acknowledges she is special to him. Meanwhile, she realizes he will graduate from college in a little over a year and asks him to do something outrageous.
| 19 | 7 | "Uzaki-chan Wants a Confession!"; Transliteration: "Uzaki-chan wa Kokuhaku sa Setai!" (Japanese: 宇崎ちゃんは告白させたい！) | November 12, 2022 |
Hana worries she will not be able to hang out with Shinichi after he graduates from college. Unwaveringly convinced he likes her and not the other way around, she plots to make him confess his feelings. She cooks him lunch, which attracts the interest of her whole family. After Hana refuses to introduce her to Shinichi, Yanagi visits the café, which dismayed Hana because Shinichi and Yanagi bond so quickly.
| 20 | 8 | "Yanagi and Kiri Want to Have Fun, Too!"; Transliteration: "Yanagi to Kiri mo Tanoshi Mitai!" (Japanese: 柳と桐も楽しみたい！) | November 19, 2022 |
Hana has a meltdown at the café because Shinichi does not call her by her first name, although he does with other people, and he calls Yanagi by her first name not ten minutes after they met. Back home, Yanagi tells her mother about meeting Shinichi, which makes Tsuki spiral into further misunderstandings. Stressed from studying for exams and not getting enough physical activity, Kiri goes to the gym where his father works to cheer himself up. However, when Shinichi also shows up, Kiri feels completely outclassed.
| 21 | 9 | "Fujio Uzaki Wants Family Time!"; Transliteration: "Uzaki Fujio wa Kazoku Sābisu Shitai!" (Japanese: 宇崎藤生は家族サービスしたい！) | November 26, 2022 |
The Uzaki family goes to Hakone Kowakien Yunessun, minus Kiri, who is still traumatized after running into Shinichi. Fujio reminisces about Hana's childhood, and soon after arriving at the resort, he chases off guys hitting on his family. He is then surrounded by young men admiring his physique, and it turns into a photoshoot as he basks in the attention. While the cat trains with the resort's mascot, Hana wanders off and runs into Shinichi and Sakaki. She offers to hang out with them, but Shinichi tells her to spend time with her family. Before they part ways, Hana gets Shinichi to compliment her bathing suit. When the family returns home, Kiri regrets not going to the outing, while a now-buff cat scares off a bunch of the neighborhood's cats.
| 22 | 10 | "We Want a Thrill Before Christmas!"; Transliteration: "Kurisumasu Mae wa Dokidoki sa Setai!" (Japanese: クリスマス前はドキドキさせたい！) | December 3, 2022 |
Hana hopes Shinichi will invite her over for Christmas. Later, while she prepares supper at his place, her imagination runs wild. He then asks her something that utterly shocks her, but not in the way she expected. The next day, she forces him to watch a horror movie in retaliation, but she gets staggeringly scared and stays overnight, which makes things awkward. As Christmas Day approaches, Hana goes drinking with Ami and Sakaki. Meanwhile, Shinichi goes back home to visit his parents for the first time in two years, where he is astounded to meet Nodoka, his baby sister, for the first time.
| 23 | 11 | "I Kind of Want to Do Things Right Already!"; Transliteration: "Nandaka Sorosoro Chanto Shitai!" (Japanese: なんだかそろそろちゃんとしたい！) | December 10, 2022 |
While drinking with Ami and Sakaki, Hana tells them how Shinichi helped her with swimming training in high school. Meanwhile, Shinichi's father gives him relationship advice while they spar. Worried about how to handle his relationship with Hana, he asks the men at the café for advice and finally realizes he cares about her and enjoys hanging out with her. With his feelings sorted, Shinichi looks forward to expressing his gratitude to Hana, and they happen to meet. Before he can say a word, however, she offers to spend Christmas with him, but she does it in a way that gets her banished from his apartment and leaves her pleading at his door.
| 24 | 12 | "I Want to Hang Out on Christmas Eve, Too!"; Transliteration: "Kurisumasuibu mo Asobitai!" (Japanese: クリスマスイブも遊びたい！) | December 17, 2022 |
Ami and Sakaki lecture Hana about her latest faux pas with Shinichi. To stir things up and make Hana jealous and reconcile with Shinichi, Yanagi shows up at the café and asks him to spend Christmas with her at his place. Unaware that her overprotective father, Fujio, knows Shinichi from the gym, Hana invites him to the Uzaki's home. Once he arrives, things get awkward, mostly for Fujio. Meanwhile, Kiri is having a miserable time at karaoke with his friends. Later, Shinichi gets drunk and becomes candidly talkative, much to Hana's delight.
| 25 | 13 | "I Want to Hang Out Together Next Year, Too!"; Transliteration: "Rainen mo Issho ni Asobitai!" (Japanese: 来年も一緒に遊びたい！) | December 24, 2022 |
After buying provisions, Fujio returns home to find the Uzaki women undressing a drunk Shinichi. Later, Hana and her father take Shinichi back to his apartment, leaving her in an awkward position. The next day at the café, Ami is in a great mood after receiving pictures of the previous evening from Yanagi. On New Year's Eve, Shinichi visits his family again, then later meets the café's gang for the year's first sunrise.

=== Other media ===
The Japanese Red Cross has used Hana's image to promote blood donation campaigns in 2019 and 2020, with the manga's creator Take also donating blood.

== Reception ==
The manga series ranked on the top 20 web manga list at Da Vinci Magazine and Niconico's Next Manga Awards in 2018.
