= The Detective Is Already Dead =

Japanese light novel series

- First light novel volume cover, featuring Siesta (left) and Kimihiko Kimizuka (right)

探偵はもう、死んでいる。 (Tantei wa Mō, Shinde Iru)
- Genre: Mystery; Adventure; Romantic comedy
- Light novel
- Written by: Nigojū
- Illustrated by: Umibōzu
- Published by: Media Factory
- English publisher: NA: Yen Press
- Imprint: MF Bunko J
- Original run: November 25, 2019 – present
- Volumes: 14
- Manga
- Written by: Nigojū
- Illustrated by: Mugiko
- Published by: Media Factory
- English publisher: NA: Yen Press
- Magazine: Monthly Comic Alive
- Original run: May 27, 2020 – October 27, 2023
- Volumes: 6
- Manga

The Detective Is Already Dead: The Lost Memory
- Written by: Nigojū
- Illustrated by: Poni
- Published by: Media Factory
- Magazine: Monthly Comic Alive
- Original run: January 27, 2021 – September 27, 2022
- Volumes: 4
- Anime television series
- Directed by: Manabu Kurihara
- Written by: Deko Akao
- Music by: Yuuyu; Naoki Tani (S1); Tatsuya Yano (S1); 40mP (S2)
- Studio: ENGI
- Licensed by: Crunchyroll: SA/SEA: Muse Communication
- Original network: AT-X, Tokyo MX, SUN, KBS, BS-NTV, TVA
- English network: SEA: Animax Asia
- Original run: July 4, 2021 – present
- Episodes: 13
- Light novel

Nagisa Natsunagi Still Wants to Be a High School Girl
- Written by: Shusui Tsukimi
- Illustrated by: Hanekoto
- Published by: Media Factory
- English publisher: NA: Yen Press
- Imprint: MF Bunko J
- Original run: August 25, 2023 – February 24, 2024
- Volumes: 2
- Light novel

Charlotte wa Tada, Jiken o Tokitai
- Written by: Hinachihoko
- Illustrated by: Minori Chigusa
- Published by: Media Factory
- Imprint: MF Bunko J
- Published: May 24, 2024
- Volumes: 1
- Light novel

Saikawa Yui wa Demo, Aidoru de Iru
- Written by: Shao Senlin
- Illustrated by: Almic
- Published by: Media Factory
- Imprint: MF Bunko J
- Published: August 23, 2024
- Volumes: 1
- Manga

Toaru Meitantei to Joshū no Love Com-deki Nichijō
- Written by: Nigojū
- Illustrated by: Moyashi Itame
- Published by: Media Factory
- Original run: February 25, 2022 – June 23, 2023
- Volumes: 2
- icon

The Detective Is Already Dead (Japanese: 探偵はもう、死んでいる。, Hepburn: Tantei wa Mō, Shinde Iru) is a Japanese light novel series written by Nigojū and illustrated by Umibōzu. Media Factory have published the series since November 2019 under their MF Bunko J imprint. A manga adaptation with art by Mugiko has been serialized in Media Factory's seinen manga magazine Monthly Comic Alive since May 2020. Both the light novel and manga are licensed in North America by Yen Press. An anime television series adaptation by ENGI aired from July to September 2021. A second season premiered in October 2026.

== Premise ==
Ever since he was a child, Kimihiko Kimizuka has attracted trouble. According to him, he was born with a condition that naturally attracts him to troublesome situations, such as being forced to join a flash mob while taking a leisurely walk, accidentally stumbling across an underworld transaction between drug dealers, and being at the site of crime scenes often enough to sometimes be considered a suspect.

One particular day in his third year of junior high, he was kidnapped and forced to carry a suitcase onto an international flight; on that flight, he met Siesta, a beautiful young woman who proclaims herself to be a "legendary detective". Forcefully made into her sidekick, Kimihiko helped her stop the plane from being hijacked, but not before Kimihiko discovered the existence of underworld organizations. After being constantly pestered, Kimihiko agrees to be Siesta's sidekick and for three years, they worked together, finding and solving an innumerable number of cases.

Now in his last year of senior high, Kimihiko is once again confronted by the ghosts of the past as he tries to solve new cases that fall into his lap. He is extremely bothered by the fact that he is called a detective; after all, the detective is already dead.

== Characters ==
Kimihiko Kimizuka (君塚 君彦, Kimizuka Kimihiko)
Voiced by: Arata Nagai (Japanese); Austin Tindle (English)
An 18-year-old high school student with a talent to attract criminals so that in his past he often witnessed various crimes and was even later questioned by the police as a suspect himself. This talent, which he himself calls a "trouble magnet", apparently also led to his encounter with the master detective Siesta, who wanted to recruit him as her assistant, which he initially refused due to his characteristic of always ending up in unpleasant situations. Author Nigojū initially planned to give him the alias "Kurokage" when creating the series of novels.
Siesta (シエスタ, Shiesuta)
Voiced by: Saki Miyashita (Japanese); Xanthe Huynh (English)
A mysterious and beautiful young woman and self-proclaimed "master detective" who owns a musket and seven items with magical abilities. Her motto is to solve criminal cases before they happen. Until her death, Siesta was a member of the Twelve Tuners, an organization of twelve people who want to save the world from chaos. Originally, Siesta was just a minor character in the series. After Nigojūs manuscript won the top prize in the MF Bunko Newcomer Award, she eventually became one of the main characters in the novel series.
Nagisa Natsunagi (夏凪 渚, Natsunagi Nagisa)
Voiced by: Ayana Taketatsu (Japanese); Arryn Zech (English)
An 18-year-old high school student. She has a strong and dominant personality. As a child, she suffered from a heart defect and was forced to stay in the hospital bed because of it. A year before the actual plot began, she received a donor heart from an unknown donor. Originally, according to the author's plans, Nagisa was to become the only main protagonist of the novel series.
Yui Saikawa (斎川 唯, Saikawa Yui)
Voiced by: Kanon Takao (Japanese); Jad Saxton (English)
A middle school girl who is already a successful idol at the age of 14 and regularly appears in magazines or commercials. She hires Kimihiko and Nagisa to protect her and an heirloom from a thief. Although Yui is the youngest character in the novel series at 14, she is considered the most adult character. Originally, Nigojū planned in his manuscript to put Yui in the role of the detective, but later changed this.
Charlotte Arisaka Anderson (シャーロット・有坂・アンダーソン, Shārotto Arisaka Andāson)
Voiced by: Saho Shirasu (Japanese); Megan Shipman (English)
A 17-year-old assassin who was originally set to assassinate Siesta. However, after losing a fight against Siesta, Charlotte began to idolize her. She is half-Japanese and was born in the United States. She becomes an assistant to Fūbi Kase.
Hel (ヘル, Heru)
Voiced by: Yumiri Hanamori (Japanese); Jamie Marchi (English)
Hel was Alicia's alter ego, who now "lives" in Nagisa's body. She was Siesta's archenemy. To save Alicia's life, Siesta sacrificed her own life, but after her death has the ability to take control of Hel's consciousness and suppress her evil side. Hel was known to "devour human hearts".
Fūbi Kase (加瀬 風靡, Kase Fūbi)
Voiced by: Mai Fuchigami (Japanese); Michelle Rojas (English)
A senior police officer who has met Kimihiko several times. Because of his talent for being in the wrong place, she is particularly skeptical of him.
Chameleon (カメレオン, Kamereon)
Voiced by: Takehito Koyasu (Japanese); Kellen Goff (English)
A member of the secret organization SPES. He has the ability to transform into a chameleon, hence the name. In his human form he has white hair and purple eyes. In his chameleon form he is much larger, has sharp teeth and takes on a fearsome appearance.
Bat (コウモリ, Kōmori)
Voiced by: Yoshitsugu Matsuoka (Japanese); Kayleigh McKee (English)
Bat is a former antagonist of the series. He was a member of the secret organization SPES and was behind the plane hijacking, but was confronted by Siesta and Kimihiko and defeated in a fight. Bat is a liar and a coward who only acts on his own whim.
Cerberus (ケルベロス, Keruberosu)
Voiced by: Jouji Nakata (Japanese); Steven Kelly (English)
A member of the secret organization SPES and is an android, who also has genes of a Kerberos and a werewolf. He is Hel's guardian. Like Chameleon, he also has the ability to assume another form - that of a werewolf. He is smart, but follows his primitive instincts.
Alicia (アリシア, Arishia)
Voiced by: Maria Naganawa (Japanese); Tia Ballard (English)
A girl with pink hair, which is tied into two ponytails. She wears a dress that is similar to Alice, the title character from the novel Alice's Adventures in Wonderland by Lewis Carroll.
Mia Whitlock (ミア・ウィットロック)
Voiced by: Akari Komiyama
Scarlet (スカーレット)
Voiced by: Nobuhiko Okamoto

== Production ==
The idea of The Detective Is Already Dead started from a random sentence the author, Nigojū, thought of one day. The sentence was "Is there a detective on the plane?", and later became the first sentence of the story.

== Media ==
=== Light novel ===
The series is written by Nigojū and illustrated by Umibōzu. Media Factory has published fourteen volumes since November 2019 under their MF Bunko J imprint. It is licensed in North America by Yen Press.

No.	Original release date	Original ISBN	English release date	English ISBN
1	November 25, 2019	978-4-04-064196-6	June 29, 2021	978-1-9753-2575-6
2	January 24, 2020	978-4-04-064328-1	October 26, 2021	978-1-9753-2577-0
3	June 25, 2020	978-4-04-064593-3	April 5, 2022	978-1-9753-2580-0
4	November 25, 2020	978-4-04-680016-9	October 4, 2022	978-1-9753-4825-0
5	May 25, 2021	978-4-04-680440-2	January 17, 2023	978-1-9753-6012-2
6	November 25, 2021	978-4-04-680914-8	August 22, 2023	978-1-9753-6897-5
7	August 25, 2022	978-4-04-681657-3	March 19, 2024	978-1-9753-7956-8
8	January 25, 2023	978-4-04-682108-9	July 23, 2024	978-1-9753-8871-3
9	May 25, 2023	978-4-04-682568-1	November 26, 2024	979-8-8554-0749-5
10	October 25, 2023	978-4-04-682766-1	June 10, 2025	979-8-8554-0751-8
11	March 25, 2024	978-4-04-682767-8	February 10, 2026	979-8-8554-1686-2
12	November 25, 2024	978-4-04-684252-7	August 11, 2026	979-8-8554-2257-3
13	July 25, 2025	978-4-04-684979-3	—	—
14	October 23, 2026	978-4-04-660316-6	—	—

==== Spin-off ====
Its spin-off Nagisa Natsunagi Still Wants to Be a High School Girl (夏凪渚はまだ、女子高生でいたい。, Natsunagi Nagisa wa Mada, Joshikōsei de Itai) is written by Syusui Tsukimi, illustrated by Hanekoto, and supervised by Nigojū. Media Factory has published two volumes since August 2023 under their MF Bunko J imprint. On February 28, 2025, Yen Press announced they had licensed the spin-off series.

No.	Original release date	Original ISBN	English release date	English ISBN
1	August 25, 2023	978-4-04-682770-8	August 12, 2025	979-8-8554-0926-0
2	February 24, 2024	978-4-04-683345-7	February 10, 2026	979-8-8554-0928-4

Another spin-off Charlotte wa Tada, Jiken wo Tokitai. (シャーロットはただ、事件を解きたい。; "Charlotte Just Wants to Solve Cases.") is written by Hinachihoko, illustrated by Minori Chigusa, and supervised by Nigojū. Media Factory published the novel in May 2024 under their MF Bunko J imprint.

No.	Release date	ISBN
1	May 24, 2024	978-4-04-683609-0

Another spin-off Saikawa Yui wa Demo, Aidoru de Iru (斎川唯はでも、アイドルでいる。; 'But Yui Saikawa Is Still an Idol') is written by Shao Senlin, illustrated by Almic, and supervised by Nigojū. Media Factory published the novel in August 2024 under their MF Bunko J imprint.

No.	Release date	ISBN
1	August 23, 2024	978-4-04-683917-6

=== Manga ===
A manga adaptation by Mugiko was serialized in Media Factory's seinen manga magazine Monthly Comic Alive from May 27, 2020, to October 27, 2023. It has been collected in six tankōbon volumes. Yen Press also licensed the manga adaptation. The manga series covers the first and third volumes of the novel series.

No.	Original release date	Original ISBN	English release date	English ISBN
1	November 21, 2020	978-4-04-680007-7	December 14, 2021	978-1-9753-3741-4
1. An Encounter with a Detective (探偵との出会い, Tantei to no Deai); 2. The Detective Is Out (探偵は、不在, Tantei wa, Fuzai); 3. Whose Heart Is This? (この心臓、誰のモノ?, Kono Shinzō, Dare no Mono?); 3. I'll Blow Your Head Off (お前の頭を吹っ飛ばす, Omae no Atama o Futtoba su); 4. Heart, Bat (心臓、コウモリ, Shinzō, Kōmori); 5. The Detective on the Plane (飛行機には、探偵, Hikōki ni wa, Tantei)
2	May 21, 2021	978-4-04-680379-5	July 12, 2022	978-1-9753-4198-5
6. Pseudohuman: Bat (人造人間-コウモリ-, Jinzō Ningen: Kōmori); 7. Mystery Meets Sci-Fi/Fantasy (ミステリはSFファンタジーと共に, Misuteri wa SF Fantajī to Tomoni); 8. Even Now, I Remember (今も、ずっと、憶えてる, Ima mo, Zutto, Oboeteru); 9. Reunion with the Detective (探偵との再会, Tantei to no Saikai); 10. A Simple Job: Protect a Three-Billion-Yen Family Treasure (三十億の家宝を守り抜く簡単なお仕事, San jū oku no Kahō o Mamorinuku Kantan'na Oshigoto)
3	July 21, 2021	978-4-04-680634-5	October 18, 2022	978-1-9753-4530-3
11. That's the "Yui-niya Quality" (それが、唯にゃクオリティ, Sore ga, Tada nya Kuoriti); 12. Thus Spoke the Super-Idol (スーパーアイドルは、かく語りき, Sūpāa Idoru wa, Kaku Katariki); 13. What That Eyes See (その瞳に視えているもの, Sono Hitomi ni mi Ete iru Mono); 14. Because You Said "Let's Go to the Beach" (海に行こうと君が言ったから, Umi ni Ikou to Kimi ga Ittakara)
4	December 23, 2021	978-4-04-680987-2	February 21, 2023	978-1-9753-6019-1
15. Cinderella Before Midnight (十二時前のシンデレラ, Jū ni-ji Mae no Shinderera); 16. The Worst Happens (最悪が、はじまった, Saiaku ga, Hajimatta); 17. Buenos Días; 18. Those Dazzling Three Years I Spent with You (君と過ごした、あの目も眩むような三年間は, Kimi to Sugoshita, Ano me mo Kuramu yō na san Nenkan wa); 19. Still Too Soon for an Epilogue (ガールズ・トーク・エクストラ, Gāruzu Tōku Ekusutora)
5	May 23, 2023	978-4-04-681737-2	June 18, 2024	978-1-9753-8039-7
20. Because You Said to Wear a Maid Uniform (君がメイド服を着ろと言ったから, Kimi ga Meido-fuku o Kiro to Ittakara); 21. The Tale of a Day No One Knows (誰も知らない日の話, Dare mo Shiranai-bi no Hanashi); 22. The Real Enemy (本当の敵, Hontō no Teki); 23. I Start Producing (プロデューサー事始め, Purodeyūsā Kotohajime)
6	October 23, 2023	978-4-04-681737-2	December 10, 2024	979-8-8554-0548-4
24. Produce an Idol: A Simple, No-Bias Job (アイドルをプロデュースするだけの簡単な推し事, Aidoru o Purodeyūsu Suru Dake no Kantan'na Oshi Koto); 25. Mystery Meets High Fantasy (ミステリは伝奇ファンタジーと共に, Misuteri wa Denki Fantajī to Tomoni); 26. What We Living Can Do (生きているわたしたちができること, Ikite iru Watashi-tachi ga Dekiru Koto); 27. Yesterday's Friend is Today's Enemy (昨日の友は今日の敵, Kinō no Tomo wa Kyō no Teki); 28. The Detective is Always Right There (探偵はずっと、そこにいる。, Tantei wa Zutto, Soko ni Iru)

A second manga adaptation by Poni titled The Detective Is Already Dead: The Lost Memory (探偵はもう、死んでいる。-the lost memory-, Tantei wa Mō, Shinde Iru: The Lost Memory) was serialized in Monthly Comic Alive from January 27, 2021, to September 27, 2022. It has been collected in four tankōbon volumes. The manga series covers the second volume of the novel series.

No.	Release date	ISBN
1	May 21, 2021	978-4-04-680505-8
2	October 21, 2021	978-4-04-680939-1
3	April 21, 2022	978-4-04-681317-6
4	November 22, 2022	978-4-04-681970-3

==== Spin-off ====
Its spin-off Toaru Meitantei to Joshū no Love Com-deki Nichijō (とある名探偵と助手のラブコメ的日常), illustrated by Moyashi Itame, has been collected in two volumes so far.

No.	Release date	ISBN
1	February 25, 2022	978-4-04-681181-3
2	June 23, 2023	978-4-04-682569-8

=== Others ===
An art book Tantei wa Mō, Shinde Iru Umi Bōzu Ātowākusu (探偵はもう、死んでいる。 うみぼうずアートワークス; The Detective Is Already Dead Umibōzu Artworks) is published by Kadokawa.

No.	Release date	ISBN
1	March 25, 2024	978-4-04-683154-5

=== Anime ===
The 12-episode anime television series adaptation was announced on January 20, 2021. The series is animated by ENGI and directed by Manabu Kurihara, with Deko Akao handling the series' scripts, and Yōsuke Itō designing the characters. Yuuyu, Naoki Tani, and Tatsuya Yano composed the series' music. It aired from July 4 to September 19, 2021, on AT-X and other channels, with the first episode airing as a one-hour special. Mary × Jon-Yakitory performed the opening theme song, "Koko de Ikiteru" (ここで生きてる; lit. 'I Am Alive Right Here'), and Kagura Nana performed the ending theme song, "Kodō" (鼓動; lit. 'Heartbeat'). Funimation licensed the series outside of Asia. Following Sony's acquisition of Crunchyroll, the series was moved to Crunchyroll. Muse Communication licensed the series in South and Southeast Asia, and streams the series on its YouTube channel (has been removed), iQIYI, and Bilibili and aired on Animax Asia.

It was announced that the VTubers Shirakami Fubuki and Natsuiro Matsuri of Hololive would have a cameo in the third episode of the anime. On July 14, 2021, it was announced that the anime would receive a German dub with the first dubbed episode airing on July 18 the same year. On October 2, 2021, Funimation announced that the series would receive an English dub, which premiered the following day.

On July 24, 2022, during the "Natsu no Gakuensai 2022" event for the MF Bunko J imprint, it was announced that the series would be receiving a second season. The staff and cast members from the first season are reprising their roles. The season was originally scheduled for July 2026, but was later delayed due to production issues. It premiered on October 7, 2026. Kōme will perform the opening theme song, "Kono Shinzō ni Hanabata wo" (この心臓に花束を; lit. 'A Bouquet for This Heart'), and Kagura Nana will perform the ending theme song, "Hakuchumu" (白昼夢; lit. 'Daydreams').

==== Season 1 (2021) ====
The first part of Ep.1, Ep.2 to Ep. 4, Ep. 10, and part of Ep. 11 to Ep. 12 cover the story of Vol.1 of the light novel series. The second part of Ep.1, Ep.5 to Ep.9, and part of Ep. 11 to Ep. 12 cover Vol.2 of the series.

No.	Title	Directed by	Written by	Storyboarded by	Original release date
1	"Attention Passengers: Is There A Detective on Board?"; Transliteration: "Okyaku-sama no Naka ni, Tantei no Kata wa Irasshaimasen ka?" (Japanese: お客様の中に、探偵の方はいらっしゃいませんか?)	Shin'ichi Fukumoto; Marina Maki	Deko Akao	Manabu Kurihara; Rin Teraoka	July 4, 2021
1	"Commence Adolescent Romantic Comedy"; Transliteration: "Kaimaku, Seishun Rabukome-hen" (Japanese: 開幕、青春ラブコメ編)	Shin'ichi Fukumoto; Marina Maki	Deko Akao	Manabu Kurihara; Rin Teraoka	July 4, 2021
An airplane flying at an altitude of 10,000 meters was hijacked. A teenage boy, Kimihiko Kimizuka, was appointed as an assistant by a mysterious girl, Siesta, who called herself a detective, and went to the cockpit. There, a man codenamed "Bat" took the captain of the plane hostage. "Bat" demanded that Siesta deduce "why they hijacked the plane" as a condition for releasing the hostages.
2	"I Still Remember, After all this Time"; Transliteration: "Ima mo, Zutto, Oboeteru" (Japanese: 今も、ずっと、憶えてる)	Fumio Itō	Deko Akao	Fumio Itō	July 11, 2021
It has been a year since Siesta died, Kimizuka goes about his daily life as a high school student. His classmate, Nagisa Natsunagi, approaches Kimizuka and asks him to find an unknown person nicknamed "X". Kimizuka enlists the help of police officer Fūbi Kase to fulfill Natsunagi's wish. Kase takes them to a maximum security prison and Kimizuka is reunited with "Bat" who once fought a deadly battle.
3	"That's Yui-nya Quality"; Transliteration: "Sore ga, Yui-nya Kuoriti" (Japanese: それが、唯にゃクオリティ)	Sōta Yokote	Hiroaki Nagashima	Ichizō Kobayashi	July 18, 2021
Yui Saikawa, a middle school idol, suddenly appears in front of Kimizuka and Natsunagi. Saikawa receives a letter that said, "I will receive a sapphire with a market value of 3 billion yen on the day of the concert at the dome." Kimizuka and Natsunagi accept Saikawa's request to inherit Siesta's wish. However, during rehearsal the day before the concert, a mysterious man approaches Saikawa on stage.
4	"What I See in That Eye"; Transliteration: "Sono Hitomi ni Miete Iru Mono" (Japanese: その瞳に視えているもの)	Ryūta Yamamoto	Nanto Teranishi	Toshihiko Masuda	July 25, 2021
Saikawa turns out to be lying. Kimizuka, who sees that the criminal's target is not the sapphire in her private house, but Saikawa's sapphire-fixed left eye, rushes to the concert with Natsunagi on the day of the concert in the dome. Kimizuka and Natsunagi look for criminals hiding in the crowded seats, but it's hard to find their whereabouts. While only impatience is requested, the time draws closer every moment.
5	"That Was Directed at One Year in the Future"; Transliteration: "Sore wa Ichinen-go no Mirai e Muketa" (Japanese: それは一年後の未来へ向けた)	Yuki Kanezawa	Deko Akao	Rin Teraoka	August 1, 2021
A year ago while Siesta was still alive, a series of mysterious incidents occurred in which the human heart was severed. Siesta and Kimizuka realized that the incident was the work of Cerberus, a member of the secret organization SPES, and planned an ambush operation. Kimizuka, who was the bait, chased the figure that invaded the pitch-dark room. However, the figure who appeared was Hel, a girl who missed Siesta.
6	"Crimson Devil, Ice Queen"; Transliteration: "Guren no Akuma, Kōri no Joō" (Japanese: 紅蓮の悪魔、氷の女王)	Fumio Itō	Hiroaki Nagashima	Fumio Itō	August 8, 2021
Siesta and Kimizuka won the battle with the leader of SPES, Hel, who suddenly appeared. Instead, Siesta suffered a leg injury for about two weeks. Kimizuka, asked to replace Siesta, met Alicia, a girl who slept in a cardboard box in a back alley. Kimizuka asked for help, but Alicia has lost her memory.
7	"In Time, You Will Recall this Day"; Transliteration: "Itsuka, Kono Hi o Omoidasu" (Japanese: いつか、この日を思い出す)	Shin'ichi Fukumoto	Nanto Teranishi	Namako Umino	August 15, 2021
Kimizuka searched for "Sapphire Eye" with Alicia, who acted as a detective during Siesta's medical treatment. At one time, Kimizuka and Alicia visited a food stall to celebrate Siesta's complete recovery. Siesta offered Kimizuka a drink to replace apple pie she had given him before, but he realized that it was late. When Siesta returned to the room, she sat on the bed and called Kimizuka.
8	"With That, We Set out on a Journey Once Again"; Transliteration: "Sōshite Mō Ichido, Tabi ni Deru" (Japanese: そうしてもう一度、旅にでる)	Ryōhei Endō	Nanto Teranishi	Namako Umino	August 22, 2021
Kimizuka and Siesta realized that Kase they met yesterday was a fake. The fifth victim died while they were upset. Siesta, who had no choice but to defeat Hel, and Kimizuka, who wanted to cherish the feelings of the bereaved family, passed each other. Three days later, Alicia was involved in the incident. Kimizuka was relieved by Alicia, but he began to realize an unacceptable reality.
9	"SPES"; Transliteration: "Supēsu" (Japanese: SPES)	Fumio Itō	Deko Akao	Namako Umino	August 29, 2021
In order to get Alicia back, finally Siesta, Anderson and Kimizuka arrived at SPES headquarters. Kimizuka, separated from Siesta, confronted the "seed" of SPES and learned the true identity of SPES. Meanwhile, Siesta reunited with Hel and tried to get Alicia back.
10	"So I Can't Become a Detective"; Transliteration: "Da kara Ore wa, Tantei ni wa Narenai" (Japanese: だから俺は、探偵にはなれない)	Rin Teraoka	Hiroaki Nagashima	Rin Teraoka	September 5, 2021
Kimizuka and Natsunagi are invited to Saikawa's luxury yacht due her scale difference, even though they were supposed to keep their promise to "go to the sea together". They enjoy the cruise, but Anderson, who was once Kimizuka's friend, appears. They will investigate the "legacy of Siesta", which is said to be sleeping on a passenger ship. In the evening, scary announcements start to spread on the cruise ship.
11	"A Light in the Midst of Hope"; Transliteration: "Kibō no Naka no Hikari" (Japanese: 希望の中の光)	Yuki Kanezawa	Hiroaki Nagashima	Hiroshi Kugimiya	September 12, 2021
Kimizuka fights against Chameleon. Even though Saikawa manages to save Natsunagi, the battle continues. It seems that Kimizuka hunts Chameleon with Anderson's help, but Chameleon's attack splits the deck in half and Kimizuka falls to the ground floor. Memories of the day when Siesta died resurfaces in his hazy consciousness.
12	"Those Dizzying Three Years I Spent with You"; Transliteration: "Kimi to Sugoshita, Ano Me mo Kuramu Yō na San Nenkan wa" (Japanese: 君と過ごした、あの目も眩むような三年間は)	Marina Maki	Deko Akao	Toshihiko Masuda	September 19, 2021
Just before the attack from Chameleon hits Kimizuka, a shot from the sky pierces through Chameleon. Siesta, in Natsunagi's body, appears carrying a weapon. Kimizuka recalls memories of the past 10,000 meters above the sky for the first time four years ago. Siesta and Kimihiko attempt to kill Chameleon while retelling their old story.

==== Season 2 (2026) ====
No.	Title	Directed by	Written by	Storyboarded by	Original release date
1	"To See You Once More"; Transliteration: "Moichido, Kimi ni Au Tame ni" (Japanese: もう一度、君に会うために)	Shin'ichi Fukumoto & Marina Maki	Deko Akao	Manabu Kurihara	October 7, 2026
2	"A Story of That Day That No One Knows"; Transliteration: "Daremo Shiranai Ano hi no Hanashi" (Japanese: 誰も知らないあの日の話)	Kōhei Kawai	Deko Akao	Manabu Kurihara	October 14, 2026
3	"An Easy Way to Support Your Favorite By Being an Idol Producer"; Transliteration: "Aidoru wo Purodyūsu Suru Dake no Kantan na Oshigoto" (Japanese: アイドルをプロデュースするだけの簡単な推し事)	Yō Nakano	Natsu Yoshioka	Yō Nakano	October 21, 2026
4	"What We, the Living, Can Do"; Transliteration: "Ikite Iru Watashitachi ga Dekiru Koto" (Japanese: 生きているわたしたちができること)	Hideaki Ōba	Hiroaki Nagashima	Toshihiko Masuda	October 28, 2026
5	"That Was Their Last Answer"; Transliteration: "Sore ga Saigo ni Dashita Kotae" (Japanese: それが最後に出した答え)	Shinichi Fukumoto	Hiroaki Nagashima	Manabu Kurihara	November 4, 2026
6	"Guardian of the World"; Transliteration: "Sekai no Shugosha" (Japanese: 世界の守護者)	TNK & Ryō Ōkubo	Deko Akao	Yasuto Nishikata	November 11, 2026
7	"Searching For a Single Future"; Transliteration: "Tatta Hitotsu no Mirai o Sagashite" (Japanese: たったひとつの未来を探して)	Yō Nakano	Natsu Yoshioka	Yō Nakano	November 18, 2026

=== Video game ===
A video game adaptation developed by Taito is set to be released in 2027 on Nintendo Switch.

== Reception ==
The light novel series won the 15th MF Bunko J newcomer award in 2019.

The light novel series placed third and first in July and August 2021 respectively on the Oricon monthly light novel chart.

As of July 2022, the series has 1 million copies in circulation.

== See also ==
- The Angel Next Door Spoils Me Rotten, another light novel series illustrated by Hanekoto
