= Studio One Base =

Japanese animation studio

Studio One Base Co., Ltd.
- Native name: 株式会社Studio One Base
- Romanized name: Kabushiki-gaisha Studio One Base
- Formerly: ENGI Co., Ltd. (2018-2026)
- Type: Subsidiary
- Industry: Japanese animation
- Founded: April 4, 2018; 8 years ago
- Headquarters: Higashi-Ikebukuro, Toshima, Tokyo, Japan
- Key people: Takeshi Kikuchi (president)
- Owner: Kadokawa
- Divisions: ENGI; Bellnox Films; RagingBull; Chiptune; Studio Kadan; Kadokawa Creators
- Website: studioonebase.jp; engi-st.net (ENGI); bellnoxfilms.jp (Bellnox Films); www.st-ragingbull.com (RagingBull); chiptune.co.jp (Chiptune); www.kadan-st.jp (Studio Kadan); creators.kadokawa.co.jp (Kadokawa Creators)

Studio One Base Co., Ltd. (Japanese: 株式会社Studio One Base, Hepburn: Kabushiki-gaisha Studio One Base) is a Japanese animation studio formed on April 4, 2018, as ENGI Co., Ltd. (Japanese: 株式会社ENGI, Hepburn: Kabushiki-gaisha Engi) by Kadokawa, Sammy Corporation, and Ultra Super Pictures, and is currently a subsidiary of Kadokawa Corporation.

The studio consists of six divisions: ENGI, Bellnox Films, RagingBull, Chiptune, Studio Kadan and Kadokawa Creators.

== History ==
=== ENGI ===
Logo for the ENGI division.

On April 4, 2018, Kadokawa established ENGI, while Sammy and Ultra Super Pictures invested on the company as well. It began operation on June 1, 2018. The studio is based in Suginami, Tokyo. Former Qtec representative director Tohru Kajio is serving as representative director for the new company. Board members include Kadokawa's Hiroshi Horiuchi and Takeshi Kikuchi, Kadokawa subsidiary Glovision's Shun'ichi Okabe, and Sammy's Ken'ichi Tokumura.

ENGI is an animation studio that mainly works within the anime industry for its shareholders Kadokawa, Sammy and Ultra Super Pictures, including but not limited to TV productions, game animations, Pachinko animations and theatrical films. The studio is responsible for producing the 2nd Kantai Collection anime, and is working on the upcoming animated comic series Okamoto Kitchen.

On March 25, 2020, it was announced ENGI opened its second studio ENGI Kurashiki Studio in Kurashiki, Okayama.

The company's original objective was mainly 2D projects, and its CGI department was launched for the 2023 Netflix series Gamera Rebirth. Building of the department and the production of the Gamera anime were simultaneously progressed, and their workloads were significantly increased.

=== Studio One Base ===
On November 1, 2026, Kadokawa rebranded the company to Studio One Base with ENGI continuing as a division of the company. As a result, Kadokawa purchased the stakes in the company from Sammy and USP.

== Works ==
=== ENGI ===
==== Television series ====
Title	Director(s)	First run start date	First run end date	Eps	Note(s)	Ref.
Kemono Michi: Rise Up	Kazuya Miura	October 2, 2019	December 18, 2019	12	Based on a manga written by Natsume Akatsuki.	
Uzaki-chan Wants to Hang Out!	Kazuya Miura	July 10, 2020	September 25, 2020	12	Based on a manga written by Take.	
Full Dive	Kazuya Miura	April 7, 2021	June 23, 2021	12	Based on a light novel written by Light Tuchihi.	
The Detective Is Already Dead	Manabu Kurihara	July 4, 2021	September 19, 2021	12	Based on a light novel written by Nigojū.	
Trapped in a Dating Sim: The World of Otome Games Is Tough for Mobs	Kazuya Miura; Shin'ichi Fukumoto	April 3, 2022	June 19, 2022	12	Based on a light novel written by Yomu Mishima.	
Uzaki-chan Wants to Hang Out! ω	Kazuya Miura	October 1, 2022	December 24, 2022	13	Sequel to Uzaki-chan Wants to Hang Out!.	
Management of a Novice Alchemist	Hiroshi Ikehata	October 3, 2022	December 19, 2022	12	Based on a light novel written by Mizuho Itsuki.	
Kantai Collection: Someday in that Sea	Kazuya Miura	November 4, 2022	March 25, 2023	8	Based on the video game of the same name developed by C2 and Kadokawa Games, and published by DMM.com; alternative story to Kantai Collection.	
Our Dating Story: The Experienced You and the Inexperienced Me	Hideaki Ōba	October 6, 2023	December 22, 2023	12	Based on a light novel written by Makiko Nagaoka.	
Unnamed Memory	Kazuya Miura	April 9, 2024	June 24, 2024	12	Based on a light novel written by Kuji Furumiya.	
Medalist	Yasutaka Yamamoto	January 5, 2025	March 30, 2025	13	Based on a manga written by Tsurumaikada.	
Unnamed Memory (season 2)	Kazuya Miura	January 7, 2025	March 25, 2025	12	Sequel to Unnamed Memory.	
Medalist (season 2)	Yasutaka Yamamoto	January 25, 2026	March 22, 2026	9	Sequel to Medalist.	
Ghost Concert: Missing Songs	Masato Jinbo	April 6, 2026	June 22, 2026	12	Based on a music project by Aria Entertainment.	
Odekake Kozame (season 2)	Chihiro Kumano	April 12, 2026	TBA	TBA	Sequel to Odekake Kozame.	
Trapped in a Dating Sim: The World of Otome Games Is Tough for Mobs (season 2)	Kazuya Miura	July 8, 2026	September 23, 2026	12	Sequel to Trapped in a Dating Sim: The World of Otome Games Is Tough for Mobs.	
The Detective Is Already Dead (season 2)	Manabu Kurihara	October 7, 2026	TBA	TBA	Sequel to The Detective Is Already Dead.	
KonoSuba: God's Blessing on This Wonderful World! (season 4)	Takaomi Kanasaki (Chief); Manabu Kurihara	2027	TBA	TBA	Sequel to KonoSuba season 3 by Drive.	

==== Original net animation ====
Title	Director(s)	Release date	Eps	Ref.
Odekake Kozame	Marina Maki	August 1, 2023 – May 10, 2024	60	
Gamera Rebirth	Hiroyuki Seshita	September 7, 2023	6	

==== Films ====
Title	Director(s)	Release date	Ref.
Eiga Odekake Kozame: Tokai no Otomodachi	Chihiro Kumano	August 22, 2025	
Gekijōban Medalist	Yasutaka Yamamoto	February 19, 2027	
Eiga Odekake Kozame: Mizu no Machi no Omoide	Chihiro Kumano	TBA	

=== Bellnox Films ===
Logo for the Bellnox Films division.

==== Television series ====
Title	Director(s)	First run start date	First run end date	Eps	Note(s)	Ref.
The Darwin Incident	Naokatsu Tsuda; Katsuichi Nakayama	January 7, 2026	April 1, 2026	13	Based on a manga written by Shun Umezawa.	

==== Original net animation ====
Title	Director(s)	Release date	Eps	Ref.
Aria the Scarlet Ammo Corto	Yoshifumi Sasahara	April 2027 – scheduled	TBA	

=== RagingBull ===
==== Television series ====
Title	Director(s)	First run start date	First run end date	Eps	Note(s)	Ref.
Rebuild World	Tsukasa Sakurai (Chief); Shingo Uchida	TBA	TBA	TBA	Based on a light novel written by Nahuse.	
