= Wound & Bandage =

Japanese manga series

- First tankōbon volume cover, featuring Gō Kiritani (left) and Riyo Washizu (right)

傷口と包帯 (Kizuguchi to Hōtai)
- Genre: Romantic comedy
- Manga
- Written by: Umihoshi Nanai
- Published by: Kodansha
- Imprint: Monthly Shōnen Magazine Comics
- Magazine: Comic Days; Monthly Magazine Base
- Original run: August 27, 2024 – present
- Volumes: 5
- Anime television series
- Directed by: Miyuki Ishida
- Written by: Susumu Yamakawa
- Music by: Kohta Yamamoto; Misaki Umase
- Studio: J.C.Staff
- Original network: ANN (ABC TV, TV Asahi)
- Original run: January 10, 2027 – scheduled
- icon

Wound & Bandage (Japanese: 傷口と包帯, Hepburn: Kizuguchi to Hōtai) is a Japanese manga series written and illustrated by Umihoshi Nanai. It was originally published as a one-shot in February 2024, before beginning serialization on Kodansha's Comic Days service under their Monthly Magazine Base label in August 2024, and has been compiled into five volumes as of July 2026. An anime television series adaptation produced by J.C.Staff is scheduled to premiere in January 2027.

== Plot ==
Gō Kiritani, a yakuza member, has been tasked with taking care of Riyo Washizu, the daughter of a powerful yakuza boss. After discovering Riyo masturbating, he discovers that Riyo has an unusual fetish: she is turned on by seeing normally strong men become weak. Gō finds this side to Riyo unusual, even being annoyed by Riyo's efforts to take care of him whenever he gets injured.

== Characters ==
Gō Kiritani (切谷 剛, Kiritani Gō)
Voiced by: Chikahiro Kobayashi
A young yazuka boss and Riyo's protector. Like most yakuza, he has a tattooed back.
Riyo Washizu (鷲巣 理世, Washizu Riyo)
Voiced by: Hisako Kanemoto
The daughter of a yakuza boss influential throughout the Kantō region. She has a fetish for strong men becoming weak, a fetish she calls yowara (ヨワラー, yowarā). Due to her interest, she likes to take care of Gō.
Ginsuke Hatobane (鳩羽 銀介, Hatobane Ginsuke)
Voiced by: Shōya Ishige
Matsu Daemon (マツデーモン, Matsudēmon)
Voiced by: Yoko Hikasa
Magical Penpengusa (マジカルぺんぺん草, Majikaru Penpengusa)
Voiced by: Yuka Iguchi
Shota Kawaramori (河原森翔太, Kawaharamori Shōta)
Voiced by: Ko Bonkobara
Mamoru Fujiyoshida (藤吉田 守, Fujiyoshida Mamoru)
Voiced by: Kengo Takanashi
Narrator (叙事)
Voiced by: Tomokazu Sugita

== Media ==
=== Manga ===
Written and illustrated by Umihoshi Nanai, the series was originally published as a one-shot in February 2024. It later began serialization on Kodansha's Comic Days service under their Monthly Magazine Base label on August 27, 2024. The first tankōbon volume was released on November 15, 2024; five volumes have been released as of July 16, 2026.

No.	Release date	ISBN
1	November 15, 2024	978-4-06-537692-8
2	April 16, 2025	978-4-06-538827-3
3	September 17, 2025	978-4-06-540785-1
4	February 17, 2026	978-4-06-542313-4
5	July 16, 2026	978-4-06-544079-7

=== Anime ===
An anime television series adaptation was announced on July 13, 2026. The series is produced by J.C.Staff and directed by Miyuki Ishida, and features scripts by Susumu Yamakawa, character designs by Natsuki Oyama, and music by Kohta Yamamoto and Misaki Umase. It is set to premiere on January 10, 2027, on the Animazing!!! programming block on all ANN affiliates, including ABC Television and TV Asahi. The opening theme song is "Show Me All Your Pain", performed by Miyavi.

== Reception ==
The series was nominated for the twelfth Next Manga Award in 2026 in the web category.
