= Rebuild World =

Japanese light novel series

- First light novel cover, featuring Alpha

リビルドワールド (Ribirudo Wārudo)
- Genre: Cyberpunk; Post-apocalyptic; Science fantasy
- Novel series
- Written by: Nahuse
- Published by: Shōsetsuka ni Narō; Kakuyomu
- Original run: February 1, 2017 – present
- Light novel
- Written by: Nahuse
- Illustrated by: Gin; yish; cell
- Published by: ASCII Media Works
- English publisher: NA: J-Novel Club (digital)
- Imprint: Dengeki no Shin Bungei
- Original run: May 17, 2019 – present
- Volumes: 9 (Note: Sixteen light novels in total have been released including the second parts of volumes 1, 2, 3, 6, 8, and 9, and the third part of volume 9.)
- Manga
- Written by: Nahuse
- Illustrated by: Kirihito Ayamura
- Published by: ASCII Media Works
- English publisher: NA: J-Novel Club (digital)
- Magazine: Dengeki Maoh
- Original run: July 26, 2019 – present
- Volumes: 16
- Anime television series
- Directed by: Tsukasa Sakurai (chief); Shingo Uchida
- Written by: Naoki Tozuka
- Studio: RagingBull
- icon

Rebuild World (Japanese: リビルドワールド, Hepburn: Ribirudo Wārudo) is a Japanese light novel series written by Nahuse, with illustrations by Gin, environmental design by yish and mechanical design by cell. Nahuse started publishing it on the novel publishing websites Shōsetsuka ni Narō and Kakuyomu in February 2017. The light novel series has been released by ASCII Media Works' imprint Dengeki no Shin Bungei since May 2019. A manga adaptation by Kirihito Ayamura has been serialized in ASCII Media Works' seinen manga magazine Dengeki Maoh since July 2019. An anime television series adaptation produced by RagingBull has been announced.

== Plot ==
Rebuild World takes place in a post-apocalyptic world, decades after an unknown cataclysm. While humanity perseveres, a majority of the population lives in squalor, only the wealthy and privileged able to eat any food which is not experimental rations. The primary way to survive in this world is by becoming a hunter—exploring the ruins of the "Old World" to find lost technology, as well as combatting the numerous organic and mechanical monsters that were born from the collapse in society.

Akira is a street orphan who wants nothing more to become a hunter, so that he can find old technology and sell it to live a better life. However, his first foray into the city ruins almost ends in disaster. Akira's life is saved by Alpha, a mysterious artificial intelligence that communicates to him alone using augmented reality. Alpha explains that she is looking to explore a particularly dangerous part of the Old World, but is physically unable to do so. Alpha offers Akira a proposition: she will act as his guide, training him in combat and teaching him how to operate as a hunter, in the hopes that he can explore the ruins for her. Akira agrees, and the two soon become entangled in the dangerous world of technology hunting.

== Characters ==
Akira (アキラ)
Voiced by: Daiki Yamashita
Alpha (アルファ, Arufa)
Voiced by: Yurika Kubo
Sheryl (シェリル, Sheriru)
Voiced by: Honoka Inoue

== Media ==
=== Light novel ===
Written by Nahuse, Rebuild World started on novel publishing websites Shōsetsuka ni Narō and Kakuyomu on February 1, 2017. It has been released as a light novel series by ASCII Media Works' imprint Dengeki no Shin Bungei, with illustrations by Gin, yish (environmental artist) and cell (mechanical design), since May 17, 2019. Nine volumes have been released as of November 2026.

The novel series was licensed for English digital release by J-Novel Club in 2022.

No.	Title	Original release date	English release date
1a	The Alluring Specter; Izanau Bōrei (誘う亡霊)	May 17, 2019; 978-4-89637-672-2	August 22, 2022; 978-1-71-839098-0
1b	Crazy, Reckless, and Rash; Muri Mucha Mubō (無理無茶無謀)	July 17, 2019; 978-4-04-912519-1	November 18, 2022; 978-1-71-839100-0
2a	Users of the Old Domain; Kyū Ryōiki Setsuzoku-sha (旧領域接続者)	November 16, 2019; 978-4-04-912730-0	March 3, 2023; 978-1-71-839102-4
2b	Revergeware; Shigo Hōfuku Irai Puroguramu (死後報復依頼プログラム)	January 17, 2020; 978-4-04-912731-7	June 16, 2023; 978-1-71-839104-8
3a	The Buried Ruin; Umoreta Iseki (埋もれた遺跡)	May 18, 2020; 978-4-04-913069-0	October 6, 2023; 978-1-71-839106-2
3b	Invitation to a Bounty Hunt; Shōkinkubi Tōbatsu no Sasoi (賞金首討伐の誘い)	September 17, 2020; 978-4-04-913070-6	January 19, 2024; 978-1-71-839108-6
4	The Old and New Worlds at War; Gen Sekai to Kyū Sekai no Tōsō (現世界と旧世界の闘争)	March 17, 2021; 978-4-04-913490-2	May 10, 2024; 978-1-71-839110-9
5	Total War; Daikibo Kōsō (大規模抗争)	August 17, 2021; 978-4-04-913738-5	August 30, 2024; 978-1-71-839112-3
6a	The AI Overseer; Tōchi-kei Kanri Jinkaku (統治系管理人格)	March 17, 2022; 978-4-04-913949-5	January 29, 2025; 978-1-71-839114-7
6b	Desire's End; Nozomi no Hate (望みの果て)	April 15, 2022; 978-4-04-913950-1	July 9, 2025; 978-1-71-839116-1
7	Superhuman; Chōjin (超人)	January 16, 2023; 978-4-04-914275-4	December 17, 2025; 978-1-71-839118-5
8a	Zone 3 Dai 3 Ōbu (第3奥部)	July 14, 2023; 978-4-04-914865-7	May 1, 2026; 978-1-71-839120-8
8b	Doppelgänger; Nise Akira (偽アキラ)	May 17, 2024; 978-4-04-914866-4	September 30, 2026; 978-1-71-839122-2
9a	Life and Death in the Balance; Seishi no Kinkō (生死の均衡)	April 17, 2025; 978-4-04-915827-4	February 16, 2027; 978-1-71-839124-6
9b	Ninshiki to Shinyō (認識と信用)	September 17, 2026; 978-4-04-952458-1	—
9c	Fukanōna Kōbō (不可能な攻防)	November 17, 2026; 978-4-04-916396-4	—

=== Manga ===
A manga adaptation, illustrated by Kirihito Ayamura, started in ASCII Media Works' seinen manga magazine Dengeki Maoh on July 26, 2019. ASCII Media Works has collected its chapters into individual tankōbon volumes. The first volume was released on December 27, 2019.

The manga series was licensed for English digital release by J-Novel Club in 2022.

No.	Original release date	Original ISBN	English release date	English ISBN
1	December 27, 2019	978-4-04-912933-5	November 1, 2022	978-1-71-831740-6
2	June 27, 2020	978-4-04-913243-4	January 11, 2023	978-1-71-831741-3
3	October 24, 2020	978-4-04-913516-9	April 11, 2023	978-1-71-831742-0
4	March 27, 2021	978-4-04-913770-5	July 5, 2023	978-1-71-831743-7
5	August 27, 2021	978-4-04-913923-5	September 27, 2023	978-1-71-831744-4
6	January 27, 2022	978-4-04-914194-8	December 20, 2023	978-1-71-831745-1
7	June 27, 2022	978-4-04-914488-8	March 13, 2024	978-1-71-831746-8
8	November 26, 2022	978-4-04-914711-7	June 5, 2024	978-1-71-831747-5
9	April 27, 2023	978-4-04-914993-7	August 28, 2024	978-1-71-831748-2
10	October 26, 2023	978-4-04-915253-1	December 18, 2024	978-1-71-831749-9
11	May 10, 2024	978-4-04-915533-4	April 30, 2025	978-1-71-831750-5
12	October 25, 2024	978-4-04-916074-1	August 6, 2025	978-1-71-831751-2
13	April 25, 2025	978-4-04-916438-1	November 12, 2025	978-1-71-831763-5
14	September 27, 2025	978-4-04-916690-3	April 29, 2026	978-1-71-831764-2
15	February 27, 2026	978-4-04-916963-8	—	—
16	July 27, 2026	978-4-04-952348-5	—	—

=== Anime ===
At Anime Expo 2023, an anime television series adaptation was announced. The series will be produced by RagingBull and directed by Shingo Uchida, with Tsukasa Sakurai serving as chief director, Naoki Tozuka handling series composition, and Hiromi Katō and others designing the characters.

== Reception ==
The series ranked fifth on the 2020 edition of Takarajimasha's Kono Light Novel ga Sugoi!. By July 2023, the series had over 750,000 copies in circulation.

== See also ==
- Haibara's Teenage New Game+, another light novel series with the same illustrator
