= Haibara's Teenage New Game+ =

Japanese light novel series

- First light novel volume cover

灰原くんの強くて青春ニューゲーム (Haibara-kun no Tsuyokute Seishun Nyū Gēmu)
- Genre: Romantic comedy
- Light novel
- Written by: Kazuki Amamiya
- Illustrated by: Gin
- Published by: Hobby Japan
- English publisher: NA: J-Novel Club
- Imprint: HJ Bunko
- Original run: December 1, 2021 – present
- Volumes: 11
- Manga
- Written by: Kazuki Amamiya
- Illustrated by: Misaomaru
- Published by: Hobby Japan
- Imprint: HJ Comics
- Magazine: Comic Fire
- Original run: June 16, 2023 – August 29, 2024
- Volumes: 3
- Manga

Ame ni Utareru Kimi ni Kasa o Sasō
- Written by: Kazuki Amamiya
- Illustrated by: Comochiya
- Published by: Hobby Japan
- Magazine: Comic Fire
- Original run: December 19, 2024 – present
- Anime television series
- Directed by: Misuzu Hoshino
- Written by: Keiichirō Ōchi
- Music by: Sōnosuke Takao
- Studio: Studio Comet
- Licensed by: Crunchyroll
- Original network: TBS, BS11, AT-X
- Original run: April 3, 2026 – June 19, 2026
- Episodes: 12
- icon

Haibara's Teenage New Game+ (Japanese: 灰原くんの強くて青春ニューゲーム, Hepburn: Haibara-kun no Tsuyokute Seishun Nyū Gēmu) is a Japanese light novel series written by Kazuki Amamiya and illustrated by Gin. It began publication under Hobby Japan's HJ Bunko light novel imprint in December 2021. A full-colored vertical manga adaptation illustrated by Misaomaru was serialized on Hobby Japan's Comic Fire manga website from June 2023 to August 2024, with a sequel illustrated by Comochiya beginning serialization on the same website in December 2024. An anime television series adaptation produced by Studio Comet aired from April to June 2026.

== Plot ==
Natsuki Haibara, a fourth-year university student, was planning for his life after graduation when he is suddenly transported back in time. He finds himself seven years in the past to when he was a first-year high school student. As he has retained memories and skills from his university life, he aims to relive his high school days and deal with his past regrets, including becoming friends with his former crush Hikari Hoshimiya.

== Characters ==
Natsuki Haibara (灰原 夏希, Haibara Natsuki)
Voiced by: Yūto Uemura
A university student who is sent back to the past and is now reliving his high school life. He had many regrets in his previous life and aims to avoid the mistakes he made before.
Hikari Hoshimiya (星宮 陽花里, Hoshimiya Hikari)
Voiced by: Kanon Takao
A beautiful high school student that Natsuki crushed on when he was in high school. In his new life, he befriends her, and though she is unaware of his feelings for her, she still comes to care for him.
Miori Motomiya (本宮 美織, Motomiya Miori)
Voiced by: Kanna Nakamura
Natsuki's childhood friend.
Uta Sakura (佐倉 詩, Sakura Uta)
Voiced by: Aya Yamane
Yuino Nanase (七瀬 唯乃, Nanase Yuino)
Voiced by: Sayumi Suzushiro
Hikari's childhood friend.
Tatsuya Nagiura (凪浦 竜也, Nagiura Tatsuya)
Voiced by: Ryōta Suzuki
Reita Shiratori (白鳥 怜太, Shiratori Reita)
Voiced by: Tomohiro Ōno
Serika Hondo (本堂 芹香, Hondo Serika)
Voiced by: Aimi
Miori's classmate and a member of the Music Club.

== Media ==
=== Light novel ===
Written by Kazuki Amamiya and illustrated by Gin, Haibara's Teenage New Game+ began publication under Hobby Japan's HJ Bunko light novel imprint on December 1, 2021. Eleven volumes have been released as of June 1, 2026. The series ended its main story in its eleventh volume, and will release an epilogue. The series is licensed in English by J-Novel Club.

No.	Original release date	Original ISBN	North American release date	North American ISBN
1	December 1, 2021	978-4-7986-2680-2	December 19, 2022	978-1-71-834280-4
2	June 1, 2022	978-4-7986-2845-5	February 20, 2023	978-1-71-834282-8
3	November 1, 2022	978-4-7986-2984-1	May 15, 2023	978-1-71-834284-2
4	March 1, 2023	978-4-7986-3094-6	August 25, 2023	978-1-71-834286-6
5	June 30, 2023	978-4-7986-3218-6	November 20, 2023	978-1-71-834288-0
6	December 1, 2023	978-4-7986-3358-9	April 26, 2024	978-1-71-834290-3
7	May 31, 2024	978-4-7986-3552-1	November 22, 2024	978-1-71-834292-7
8	December 27, 2024	978-4-7986-3723-5	June 20, 2025	978-1-71-834294-1
9	July 1, 2025	978-4-7986-3887-4	February 27, 2026	978-1-71-834296-5
10	April 1, 2026	978-4-7986-4060-0	—	—
11	June 1, 2026	978-4-7986-4195-9	—	—

=== Manga ===
A full-colored vertical manga adaptation illustrated by Misaomaru was serialized on Hobby Japan's Comic Fire manga website from June 16, 2023, to August 29, 2024. Its chapters have been compiled into three digital volumes as of February 2026.

A sequel illustrated by Comochiya began serialization on the same website on December 19, 2024.

No.	Release date	ISBN
1	August 1, 2025	—
2	October 31, 2025	—
3	February 2, 2026	—

=== Anime ===
An anime adaptation was announced by the HJ Bunko X account on July 1, 2025, which was later confirmed to be a television series that is produced by Studio Comet and directed by Misuzu Hoshino, with series composition handled by Keiichirō Ōchi, characters designed by Hiromi Ono, and music composed by Sōnosuke Takao. The series aired from April 3, 2026, to June 19, 2026, on TBS and other networks. (Note: TBS listed the series premiere on April 2 at 25:28, which is effectively April 3 at 1:28 a.m. JST.) The opening theme song is "Fly Again!!", performed by Ami Maeshima, while the ending theme song is "Dramatic Tōhikō" (ドラマチック逃避行; 'Dramatic Runaway Trip'), performed by Aimi. Crunchyroll is streaming the series.

==== Episodes ====
No.	Title	Directed by (Note: Production staff information is taken from the ending credits of each episode.)	Written by	Storyboarded by	Original release date
1	"The Gray Boy's Plan For a Colorful Adolescence"; Transliteration: "Haīro Shōnen no Nijishoku Seishun Keikaku" (Japanese: 灰色少年の虹色青春計画)	Misuzu Hoshino	Keiichirō Ōchi	Misuzu Hoshino	April 3, 2026
University student Natsuki reminisces about all the mistakes he made in high school. Despite graduating university and getting a good job he cannot get over his teenage regrets. The next morning, he awakens as a teenager again and realises he can have his high school life over again while avoiding the same mistakes. He spends the month before the entrance ceremony exercising and improving his appearance. His childhood friend Miori is amazed at the difference, as is he as she used to be a tomboy. At the entrance ceremony he encounters Hikari, his teenage crush who rejected him, her friend Yuino and three others he failed to make friends with the first time; Reita, Tatsuya and Uta. He is surprised to be included so easily in the group this time, and that Hikari blushes when he speaks to her. Miori is impressed Natsuki is making friends already and asks his help getting to know Reita, who is her type. A week later everyone is good friends and decide to spend a Saturday together. By monitoring Hikari's schedule Natsuki is able to invite her to walk home together on a day when everyone else is busy and instigate the creation of a friends group chat, which Hikari names the Natsuki-kun Family.
2	"Dreamlike Days"; Transliteration: "Yume no Yōna Hibi" (Japanese: 夢のような日々)	Tomoki Watanabe	Keiichirō Ōchi	Masaharu Okuwaki	April 10, 2026 (Note: Due to the broadcast of the 2026 Masters Tournament, this episode aired at 2:57 a.m. JST, 1 hour and 29 minutes after the original air time on TBS.)
Natsuki offers Miori information on Reita if she helps him buy an outfit for Saturday with his friends. As a bonus, Miori promises to help get him a girlfriend if she ends up dating Reita. Saturday, Natsuki reveals he plans to get a job. Yuino reveals she already works at Café Mares and offers to introduce Natsuki to her manager. In private, Reita asks Natsuki if he is scared of Tatsuya, since he rarely speaks to him and flinches around him. Natsuki recalls in his first high school experience Tatsuya ended his friendship with him as he found him pathetic and annoying, which Natsuki still has not gotten over. Later, everyone realises Natsuki is good at basketball, which Natsuki attributes to losing weight and his first high school experience training on the school team while being ignored by his teammates. Tatsuya challenges him to a one-on-one game. Wanting to get over the past, Natsuki agrees to play and hopefully impress Hikari. Having spent years watching Tatsuya play, Natsuki knows his moves and is able to keep up. Natsuki recalls while the original Tatsuya wasn't exactly a friend, he was one of the few who did not make his life worse. Natsuki wins the match, impressing Tatsuya.
3	"Perfect Behavior"; Transliteration: "Kanpeki na Furumai o" (Japanese: 完璧な振る舞いを)	Misuzu Hoshino	Kenichi Yamashita	Misuzu Hoshino	April 17, 2026
Natsuki begins working at Café Mares, where his skills from being a former adult impresses the manager, Kirishima. With midterms approaching, the group decide to hold study sessions. During the first session Natsuki is momentarily enchanted by Uta before confusedly snapping out of it. They begin holding sessions daily, and Tatsuya teases him over Uta, though Natsuki insists it is Hikari he is interested in. Tatsuya claims he doesn't have a crush on anyone. Miori joins the next session with her friend Serika and notices Uta staring at Miori, so she secretly informs Natsuki he has made an idiotic mistake, but won't tell him what he did. Hikari calls Natsuki that night, worried something is wrong with Tatsuya. After midterms everyone goes to karaoke and Natsuki impresses everyone, since he was once addicted to solo karaoke. Tatsuya abruptly leaves and becomes angry when Natsuki shows concern about him. Reita reveals Tatsuya is struggling with jealousy, since Natsuki beat him at basketball, can cook, is smart and is even a good singer, all of which impressed Uta whom Tatsuya is in love with. Natsuki realises this is the mistake Miori warned him about. Despite looking up to Tatsuya, he failed to notice his feelings and has deeply upset him.
4	"If You Support Me"; Transliteration: "Kimi ga Sasaete Kureru Nara" (Japanese: 君が支えてくれるなら)	Tomoki Watanabe	Keiichirō Ōchi	Masaharu Okuwaki	April 24, 2026
Tatsuya distances himself from the group and Natsuki returns to his loner habits, avoiding Uta in particular in case it upsets Tatsuya. Miori notices Uta is upset and asks Natsuki about it. Natsuki feels better after remembering Miori always comforted him when he was upset, so he tells her everything. The next day he confronts Tatsuya, who admits he hates himself for being jealous and for not being able to impress Uta himself, so Natsuki shouldn't apologise. Tatsuya is shocked when Natsuki shouts at him, since Miori told him the same thing; Natsuki has done nothing wrong, Tatsuya caused his own pain by being cowardly and should stop comparing himself to Natsuki. Natsuki then shows him a picture of himself overweight, proving how hard he had to work to feel equal to people like Tatsuya. Tatsuya realises he should apologise to everyone. Having eavesdropped their conversation, Uta rejects Tatsuya whom she only sees as a friend. Everyone else asks to see the photo of overweight Natsuki. Their group gets back together but Uta is surprised Tatsuya refuses to give up on her. Natsuki is grateful to Miori for helping. Meanwhile, Uta is deeply upset Natsuki isn't interested in her and wonders who he likes instead.
5	"I'll Give You an Umbrella When You're In the Rain"; Transliteration: "Ame ni Utareru Kimi ni Kasa o Sasou" (Japanese: 雨に打たれる君に傘を差そう)	Aito Mizuki	Kazuhiko Inukai	Enyuan Long	May 1, 2026
As their group is back together Miori decides to arrange a double-date for her and Reita, and Natsuki with Hikari. At Miori's urging Natsuki invites Hikari to a movie. At first Hikari seems reluctant, then misunderstands by thinking he wants her help to get Miori together with Reita. Uta asks to join them and Natsuki feel terrible he has to refuse, though Miori insists it is the safest option. The movie goes smoothly, but afterwards Miori is confronted by her basketball senior Wakamura for skipping practise. Reita worries Miori has damaged her relationship with her team and cryptically asks Natsuki to look out for her. Miori concludes the date was a failure. Natsuki observes her next practise where there is tension between Miori and Wakamura. Uta reveals despite being a first year and skipping practise Miori earned a prestigious spot on the team that Wakamura wanted. Tatsuya helps Natsuki realise Miori, who used to be helpful to her teammates, now hogs the ball and tries to score as many points as possible by herself. Uta later calls Natsuki upset after an argument with Wakamura. Natsuki has a sudden idea for how to intervene between Miori and Wakamura, and asks Uta for help.
6	"Wish"; Transliteration: "Negaigoto" (Japanese: ねがいごと)	Kyōhei Suzuki	Kenichi Yamashita	Naoyuki Kuzuya	May 8, 2026
Natsuki challenges Miori to basketball, with the loser having to obey the winner. Miori is surprised when Natsuki beats her but agrees to his demand that she accept his help. She confesses she overheard her teammates describe her as arrogant, so she began hogging the ball to prove how good she is, but now her team don't trust her. Natsuki and Uta help her practise passing the ball and promise to support her. At next practise Miori starts to get back to normal. Miori asks Natsuki to watch her next game, which she wins by cooperating with her teammates. Uta asks Natsuki to Tanabata festival where after food and games Natsuki almost kisses her, but hesitates due to thinking about Hikari. Uta acts normally and insists they write wishes on Tanzaku for the festival. Uta hides her wish from him while Natsuki wishes for a fun adolescence. Uta changes her wish at the last second to match Natsuki's, throwing her first wish away. Uta holds Natsuki's hand back to her parent's shop but as he walks away, she kisses him on the cheek. She then urges him not to respond until she has tried harder to win his heart. Natsuki is unsure how to feel. Uta's discarded wish is shown to be that Natsuki falls in love with her.
7	"Aiming for the Ultimate Summer"; Transliteration: "Saikou no Natsu o Mezashite" (Japanese: 最高の夏を目指して)	Yurika Fukaya	Keiichirō Ōchi	Masaharu Okuwaki	May 15, 2026
Hikari hides from her parents she is writing a novel. Natsuki admits to Reita he might like both Uta and Hikari. Reita admits he likes Miori. The group plan a summer beach trip. Hikari admits she can't go, with Yuino revealing her father is strict and would never let Hikari on an overnight trip with boys. Miori is shown to know about Uta kissing Natsuki, and is not happy about it. Natsuki realises he doesn't know much about Hikari as a person. The group decide to rent a beach cottage and invite Miori and her friend Serika. Yuino takes Natsuki with her to buy a bikini, unaware how awkward it would be. They encounter Hikari with her father, Sei, who is furious to see Natsuki as Hikari had told him only girls were going to the beach. Natsuki recognises Sei as Vice-president of Starflat, a machine maintenance firm, and in seven years' time Sei will reject Natsuki for a job for being an independent thinker instead of a mindlessly obedient salaryman. Natsuki feels guilty for getting Hikari in trouble. Later, Hikari lets Natsuki read her novel, which is set by the ocean. Natsuki starts to worry about Hikari's mental state. Later, Hikari calls Natsuki to tell him she ran away from home.
8	"Your Dream and the Secret Relationship"; Transliteration: "Kimi no Yume to Himitsu no Kankei" (Japanese: 君の夢と秘密の関係)	Tomoki Watanabe	Kazuhiko Inukai	Enyuan Long	May 22, 2026
Natsuki lets Hikari stay with him. She reveals her father told her to stop writing novels and dump her friends. Tired of pretending to be his ideal daughter, she ran away to be herself. She admits at first she didn't like Natsuki for his perfection, but after his argument with Tatsuya she realised he was also hiding his true self. The next morning Hikari plans to send Sei her finished novel to prove she is a good author, so she and Natsuki work on it all day. Yuino realises Hikari's male protagonist is based on Natsuki, so to improve the character Hikari asks Natsuki questions about himself, including if he is in love with anyone. Natsuki admits yes but hides that it is both her and Uta. Hikari finishes her novel and with Yuino and Natsuki's support, Hikari agrees to return home but intends to live as she pleases. Sei demands she obey his plan for her future to ensure her prosperity. Hikari points out Sei is rich but he is not happy, his marriage is failing and he has caused Hikari to hate him. She gives him her novel, and refuses to be his puppet daughter anymore. Sei grudgingly agrees to read it. Natsuki hopes things might improve now for her.
9	"The End of a Miraculous Summer"; Transliteration: "Kiseki no You na Natsu no Owari" (Japanese: 奇跡のような夏の終わり)	Ichika Yumekawa	Kenichi Yamashita	Tomoko Iwasaki	May 29, 2026
Hikari is able to attend the beach trip. Miori brings her friend Serika, who immediately asks if Natsuki is dating Uta, revealing she saw Uta kiss him at the festival. Hikari is visibly angry at this before she and Uta are upset when Natsuki and Serika discuss music. The boys are entranced by the girls in their bikinis. As Miori and Reita spend time together Hikari wonders if they are dating. Reita confirms they are not, but hopes it will be soon. During a private moment, Hikari holds Natsuki's hand, but he feels guilty as he keeps thinking about Uta. Hikari also starts to feel guilty, as though she is getting between Natsuki and Uta. Uta lights a firework for Natsuki's upcoming birthday and promises to get him the best present. Overnight, Natsuki finds he has no idea what to do about Hikari and Uta. Next morning he goes alone to watch the sunrise but finds Hikari had the same idea. Hikari reveals she is already planning to rewrite her novel to make it better. She also cryptically claims she decided not to let Uta defeat her, though Natsuki misunderstands her meaning. Later, when school starts again, Uta gives him a necklace for his birthday while Hikari writes him a short story. Serika asks him to join Music Club and form a band.
10	"Facade"; Transliteration: "Haribote" (Japanese: ハリボテ)	Yurika Fukaya	Kazuhiko Inukai	Enyuan Long	June 5, 2026
Hikari decides to be honest with Uta about her feelings for Natsuki. Natsuki recalls the previous day a new employee started at the café, Shinohara. Just after this everyone went to karaoke, including Serika, where she first heard him sing. Natsuki was also impressed with her guitar playing, which he never managed to master in his first life. Returning to school, music club member Iwano mistook Natsuki for Serika's boyfriend, and Natsuki was concerned when Serika did not deny it. Natsuki tries to find reasons to refuse, then realises that is what the old him would have done, so he agrees instead. To complete the band, Serika plans to convince the reluctant Iwano to be drummer and leaves it to Natsuki to find a bass player. Natsuki buys himself a Fender Strat identical to one he owned previously. Iwano is impressed with Natsuki's singing and agrees to join the band until the culture festival, as after that he will be getting serious about studying to become a doctor. Natsuki discovers Shinohara is an amateur bass player, and is convinced to join the band despite his fear he is not yet good enough.
11	"Monochrome"; Transliteration: "Monokuro" (Japanese: モノクロ)	Kyōhei Suzuki	Keiichirō Ōchi	Kyōhei Suzuki	June 12, 2026
Hikari tells Uta she loves Natsuki. Uta insists they both try their hardest, and will remain friends regardless of who Natsuki chooses. Natsuki fears he is the least skilled member of the band. He admits to Uta he is struggling to sing and play guitar at the same time. Uta asks what his motivation is. Natsuki realizes he has many reasons, but none important enough to be his main motivation, so he claims he wants to impress someone. As the goal is to play at the school festival, Natsuki suggests mainstream songs, but Serika suggests they promote their own songs on her social media first. As they need three songs, Serika provides her original song "Black Witch" and an unfinished song she asks Natsuki to write lyrics for. Natsuki asks Hikari for help with his lyrics. Hikari points out lyrics are supposed to tell a story, but his only communicate vague impressions of a sad past. Natsuki rewrites them to include a hopeful future and titles the song "Monochrome". Iwano suggests Mishmash Leftovers as their band name. Tatsuya asks Natsuki about Uta, and Natsuki realises he has been putting off making a decision from cowardice. With inspiration from Hikari, Natsuki writes a third song about becoming a better person, with lyrics that embarrass Hikari a little.
12	"To the Stars"; Transliteration: "Hoshi e" (Japanese: 星へ)	Misuzu Hoshino	Keiichirō Ōchi	Misuzu Hoshino	June 19, 2026
Serika admits her previous band were not as serious about music as her, so she asks Natsuki to keep playing together after Iwano quits. Culture festival arrives and Natsuki tries to talk to Uta about something important, but she confesses to him first and asks to be his girlfriend. He ends up rejecting her as he has feelings for Hikari. Uta is disappointed, but not surprised and despite crying, she urges him to confess to Hikari so it will be easier to forget how she feels for him. Tatsuya is furious at Natsuki rejecting Uta, but he tells her he doesn't like her that way. Tatsuya, unsatisfied with his answer, attempts to hit him, but is unable to and walks away instead. Iwano admits to Natsuki he learned drums to impress a girl, but she already has a boyfriend, so he decided to be happy for her. Mishmash Leftovers are a huge hit with the school with Black Witch and Monochrome. The third song, "To The Stars", Natsuki publicly dedicates to the girl he loves. Reita confesses to Miori, who accepts, and Tatsuya quietly consoles Uta. After the festival Natsuki confesses to Hikari, which she accepts. That night, Miori calls Natsuki to celebrate both dating the people they like. When Natsuki can tell she is crying, she announces their partnership is over as she has Reita and he has Hikari, and abruptly hangs up the phone.

== Reception ==
The series won the grand prize at the HJ Novel Award in 2020.

== See also ==
- Rebuild World, another light novel series with the same illustrator
