= Odekake Kozame =

Japanese manga by Penguin Box

- Cover of the first volume

おでかけ子ザメ
- Manga
- Written by: Penguin Box
- Published by: Enterbrain (magazine serialization); Chukei Publishing (volumes)
- Imprint: Kitora
- Magazine: Aokishi
- Original run: October 20, 2021 – present
- Volumes: 8
- Original net animation
- Directed by: Marina Maki
- Written by: Hiroaki Nagashima
- Music by: Yoshiaki Fujisawa
- Studio: ENGI
- Released: August 1, 2023 – May 10, 2024
- Runtime: 1 minute
- Episodes: 60
- Anime film

Eiga Odekake Kozame: Tokai no Otomodachi
- Directed by: Chihiro Kumano
- Written by: Hiroaki Nagashima
- Music by: Yoshiaki Fujisawa
- Studio: ENGI
- Released: August 22, 2025
- Runtime: 74 minutes
- Anime television series

Odekake Kozame 2nd Season
- Directed by: Chihiro Kumano
- Written by: Hiroaki Nagashima
- Music by: Yoshiaki Fujisawa
- Studio: ENGI
- Original network: TXN (TV Tokyo)
- Original run: April 12, 2026 – present
- Episodes: 31
- Anime film

Eiga Odekake Kozame: Mizu no Machi no Omoide
- Directed by: Chihiro Kumano
- Written by: Hiroaki Nagashima
- Studio: ENGI

Odekake Kozame (おでかけ子ザメ; 'Little Shark's Outings') is a Japanese manga series written and illustrated by Penguin Box. Originally published as a web manga on Twitter in June 2021, it was later picked up for serialization by Kadokawa Corporation and Enterbrain, who then began serializing the series on their Aokishi magazine in October of the same year. The series has been compiled into eight tankōbon volumes by Chukei Publishing as of March 2026. An original net (ONA) anime adaptation by ENGI was released on YouTube from August 2023 to May 2024. An anime film also by ENGI titled Eiga Odekake Kozame: Tokai no Otomodachi opened in Japan in August 2025. A second season premiered in April 2026. A second anime film titled Eiga Odekake Kozame: Mizu no Machi no Omoide has been announced.

== Characters ==
Kozame-chan (子ザメちゃん)
Voiced by: Kana Hanazawa
Ankō-chan (あんこうちゃん)
Voiced by: Megumi Han
Usame-chan (うさめちゃん)
Voiced by: Misaki Kuno
Man with a Mohawk (モヒカンあにき, Mohikan Aniki)
Voiced by: Yūichirō Umehara
Haruto (はると)
Voiced by: Natsuki Hanae
Sora (そら)
Voiced by: Manaka Iwami
Miho (みほ)
Voiced by: Rin Kurusu
Big Brother Salaryman
Voiced by: Toshiya Miyata
Mr. Bartender
Voiced by: Akira Takano
Mr. Host
Voiced by: Kazuto Mokudai
Photographer Lady
Voiced by: Ai Furihata
Manabu
Voiced by: Makoto Koichi
Model Lady
Voiced by: Sayaka Kikuchi
Ojii-san
Voiced by: Naomi Kusumi
Proprietress
Voiced by: Kana Ueda
Dobel-san
Voiced by: Ryōta Suzuki

== Media ==
=== Manga ===
No.	Japanese release date	Japanese ISBN
1	January 19, 2022	978-4-04-605570-5
2	August 3, 2022	978-4-04-605937-6
3	May 30, 2023	978-4-04-606352-6
4	October 26, 2023	978-4-04-606570-4
5	June 21, 2024	978-4-04-606925-2
6	December 24, 2024	978-4-04-607329-7
7	July 17, 2025	978-4-04-607529-1; 978-4-04-607530-7 (SE)
8	March 16, 2026	978-4-04-607955-8; 978-4-04-607956-5 (SE)

=== Anime ===
An anime adaptation was announced on May 25, 2023. The original net animation (ONA) series is animated by ENGI and directed by Marina Maki, with Hiroaki Nagashima writing and supervising the scripts, Arisa Yoshii designing the characters, and Yoshiaki Fujisawa composing the music at Kadokawa Corporation. It was released on YouTube from August 1, 2023, to May 10, 2024. The anime's theme song is "Yorimichi" performed by Kana Hanazawa.

A new anime project was announced after the final episode of the series on May 10, 2024. It was later revealed to be a film produced again by ENGI and directed by Chihiro Kumano, with Hiroaki Nagashima returning to write the scripts, Ayumi Takeuchi designing the characters, and Yoshiaki Fujisawa returning to compose the music. Titled Eiga Odekake Kozame: Tokai no Otomodachi, it opened in Japanese theaters on August 22, 2025. The film's theme song is "Yorimichi" performed by Lozareena.

A second season was announced on December 18, 2025. The cast and staff from the film are reprising their roles. It premiered on April 12, 2026, within the Animori! program on TV Tokyo and its affiliates, and also streams on YouTube.

A second anime film, titled Eiga Odekake Kozame: Mizu no Machi no Omoide, was announced on November 15, 2026. The cast and staff from the film and the second season are again reprising their roles.

=== Collaborations ===
The franchise has collaborated with various other characters, productions, facilities, and municipalities, including releases of special episodes (manga and anime) of Gamera Rebirth, Chibi Godzilla, Rody, Chiba Prefecture, and Kurashiki city.
