= Unnamed Memory =

Japanese light novel series and its adaptation(s)

- First light novel volume cover
- Genre: Fantasy
- Novel series
- Written by: Kuji Furumiya
- Published by: Shōsetsuka ni Narō
- Original run: September 18, 2012 – present
- Light novel
- Written by: Kuji Furumiya
- Illustrated by: Chibi
- Published by: ASCII Media Works
- English publisher: NA: Yen Press
- Imprint: Dengeki no Shin Bungei
- Original run: January 17, 2019 – April 17, 2021
- Volumes: 6
- Manga
- Written by: Kuji Furumiya
- Illustrated by: Naoki Koshimizu
- Published by: ASCII Media Works
- English publisher: NA: Yen Press
- Magazine: Dengeki Daioh
- Original run: September 26, 2020 – present
- Volumes: 10
- Light novel

Unnamed Memory: After the End
- Written by: Kuji Furumiya
- Illustrated by: Chibi
- Published by: ASCII Media Works
- Imprint: Dengeki no Shin Bungei
- Original run: February 17, 2022 – present
- Volumes: 6
- Anime television series
- Directed by: Kazuya Miura
- Written by: Deko Akao
- Music by: Akito Matsuda
- Studio: ENGI
- Licensed by: Crunchyroll
- Original network: AT-X, Tokyo MX, MBS, BS11
- English network: SEA: Animax Asia
- Original run: April 9, 2024 – March 25, 2025
- Episodes: 24
- icon

Unnamed Memory is a Japanese light novel series by Kuji Furumiya. It originated from the novel posting website Shōsetsuka ni Narō in September 2012. It was later acquired by ASCII Media Works, who published the series with illustrations by Chibi under their Dengeki no Shin Bungei imprint. The series was published in six volumes, released from January 2019 to April 2021. A manga adaptation with illustrations by Naoki Koshimizu began serialization in ASCII Media Works' Dengeki Daioh magazine in September 2020. As of March 2026, it has been published in ten tankōbon volumes. An anime television series adaptation produced by ENGI aired from April to June 2024, with the second season aired from January to March 2025.

== Plot ==
Oscar, the crown prince of the powerful country of Falsas, is under a curse that prevents him from having descendants; the curse will kill any woman who bear his child. Climbing the tower where the Witch of The Azure Moon resides and completing her trial, Oscar wishes that his curse be lifted. The witch, Tinasha, confesses that it is almost impossible to break the curse, but provides an alternative—to take a woman with great magical power that the curse is unable to kill, as a wife. Oscar suggests Tinasha herself become his wife instead; she refuses, but agrees to accept Oscar's request to descend her tower and live in Falsas with him for a year.

== Characters ==
Oscar Lyeth Increatos Loz Farsas (オスカー・ラエス・インクレアートゥス・ロズ・ファルサス, Osukā Raesu Inkureātusu Rozu Farusasu)
Voiced by: Yoshiki Nakajima
The next heir to the throne of Falsas. A curse was placed on him preventing him from having an heir. To break this curse, he visited the Witch of the Azure Moon. Upon meeting her, he asked her to marry him.
Tinasha (ティナーシャ, Tināsha)
Voiced by: Atsumi Tanezaki
Said to be the most powerful on the continent. She is also known as "The Witch of Azure Moon". She lives on the top floor of a tower in the middle of the wilderness full of many trials. It has been said that she will grant the wishes of those who reach her. Even though she looks like a 16-year-old girl, her body has stopped growing, and has lived for hundreds of years. Upon meeting Oscar, He asked her to break the curse put upon him.
Lazar (ラザル, Razaru)
Voiced by: Shūichirō Umeda
Sylvia (シルヴィア, Shiruvia)
Voiced by: Yūko Natsuyoshi
Meredina (メレディナ)
Voiced by: Chinatsu Akasaki
Ars (アルス, Arusu)
Voiced by: Takuya Satō
Kav (カーヴ, Kāvu)
Voiced by: Kōhei Amasaki
Narc (ナーク, Nāku)
Voiced by: Chitose Morinaga
Lucrezia (ルクレツィア, Rukuretsia)
Voiced by: Ayako Kawasumi
Lanak (ラナク, Ranaku)
Voiced by: Junichi Yanagita
Travis (トラヴィス, Toravisu)
Voiced by: Jun Fukuyama
Leonora (レオノーラ, Reonōra)
Voiced by: Chiwa Saitō

== Media ==
=== Light novels ===
Written by Kuji Furumiya, the series started as a web novel published on the Shōsetsuka ni Narō novel website in September 2012. It was later acquired by ASCII Media Works, who published the series with illustrations by Chibi under its Dengeki no Shin Bungei imprint. The first volume was released on January 17, 2019. The sixth and final volume was released on April 17, 2021.

In July 2020, Yen Press announced they licensed the series for English publication.

A sequel series titled Unnamed Memory: After the End began publication on February 17, 2022. It will end in the eighth volume on December 17, 2026.

==== Volumes ====
| No. | Original release date | Original ISBN | English release date | English ISBN |
|---|---|---|---|---|
| 1 | January 17, 2019 | 978-4-04-912267-1 | November 17, 2020 | 978-1-9753-1709-6 |
1. A Curse and the Azure Tower; 2. Countless Mentions of the Past; 3. The Transparency of Night; 4. On the Shores of the Lake; 5. Falling into the Water; 6. A Dream in the Forest; 7. Breathing Life into Form; 8. This Breath Comes from Beyond; 9. Tonight, Under the Moon; 10. Unnamed Feeling
| 2 | May 17, 2019 | 978-4-04-912380-7 | March 23, 2021 | 978-1-9753-1711-9 |
1. The Call of the Soul; 2. Thinking of You; 3. When the Abyss Formed; 4. The Shape of Emotion; 5. The Side of Me Unknown to You; 6. The Dream Is Over; 7. Teatime; 8. Ocean Blue; 9. Nighttime Serenade; 10. Moon Fragments; 11. Green Vines; 12. The Same Dream for a Time
| 3 | September 17, 2019 | 978-4-04-912381-4 | July 20, 2021 | 978-1-9753-1714-0 |
1. The Consequences of Striking a Deal; 2. The Outcast's Thorn; 3. The Unknown; 4. A Child with an Open Mind; 5. Night of Clipped Talons; 6. Sandcastle; 7. Before Act One Ends; 8. Memories of Both; Intermission: Refusing to Despair; Extra
| 4 | January 17, 2020 | 978-4-04-912803-1 | January 4, 2022 | 978-1-9753-1716-4 |
1. Silent Song; 2. Emotionless Words; 3. Sprouting Glass Wings; 4. Inaudible Whisper; 5. Other Side of the Mirror; 6. Black Sighs; 7. Song of the Spinning Wheel; 8. Answerless Prayer; 9. Invisible Face; Extra
| 5 | June 17, 2020 | 978-4-04-912804-8 | June 28, 2022 | 978-1-9753-3967-8 |
1. Shellwork Memory; 2. Moon Crystals; 3. Returning the Promise; 4. The Crystal Orb's Enchanted Sleep; 5. Contagious Hopes; 6. Bloodless Scars; 7. A Happy Kind of Sadness; 8. Finding a Seed; 9. The Present According to the Future; 10. Half of Eternity; Extra: Perchance to Dream
| 6 | April 17, 2021 | 978-4-04-912805-5 | October 18, 2022 | 978-1-9753-4336-1 |
1. The Song That Is No Lullaby; 2. Monochromatic Flowers; 3. The Pride of the Past; 4. At the End of a Memory; 5. Once upon a Time, with You; 6. Born as Irreplaceable Copies; 7. Fate's Compensation; Intermission: A Lost Fragment; 8. The Gray Room; 9. Where the Story Goes; Extra: The Song Heard Round the Tower

==== After the End ====
| No. | Release date | ISBN |
|---|---|---|
| 1 | February 17, 2022 | 978-4-04-913870-2 |
| 2 | December 16, 2022 | 978-4-04-914755-1 |
| 3 | October 17, 2023 | 978-4-04-915288-3 |
| 4 | April 17, 2024 | 978-4-04-915604-1 |
| 5 | January 17, 2025 | 978-4-04-916143-4 |
| 6 | May 16, 2025 | 978-4-04-916326-1 |
| 7 | November 17, 2026 | 978-4-04-916850-1 |
| 8 | December 17, 2026 | 978-4-04-952413-0 |

=== Manga ===
A manga adaptation, illustrated by Naoki Koshimizu, began serialization in ASCII Media Works' Dengeki Daioh magazine on September 26, 2020. As of March 2026, the individual chapters have been collected into ten tankōbon volumes. The manga is also licensed by Yen Press.

==== Volumes ====
| No. | Original release date | Original ISBN | English release date | English ISBN |
|---|---|---|---|---|
| 1 | April 9, 2021 | 978-4-04-913712-5 | August 23, 2022 | 978-1-9753-4980-6 |
| 2 | September 27, 2021 | 978-4-04-913989-1 | February 21, 2023 | 978-1-9753-4982-0 |
| 3 | June 10, 2022 | 978-4-04-914472-7 | June 20, 2023 | 978-1-9753-6743-5 |
| 4 | January 10, 2023 | 978-4-04-914829-9 | January 30, 2024 | 978-1-9753-7562-1 |
| 5 | August 10, 2023 | 978-4-04-915189-3 | June 18, 2024 | 978-1-9753-9478-3 |
| 6 | February 26, 2024 | 978-4-04-915541-9 | March 25, 2025 | 979-8-8554-1202-4 |
| 7 | September 27, 2024 | 978-4-04-915921-9 | January 20, 2026 | 979-8-8554-2085-2 |
| 8 | December 26, 2024 | 978-4-04-916115-1 | September 22, 2026 | 979-8-8554-2420-1 |
| 9 | July 26, 2025 | 978-4-04-916493-0 | — | — |
| 10 | March 27, 2026 | 978-4-04-952161-0 | — | — |

=== Anime ===
An anime television series adaptation was announced on December 13, 2022. It is produced by ENGI, and directed by Kazuya Miura, with scripts written by Deko Akao, character designs handled by Chika Nōmi, and music composed by Akito Matsuda. The series was initially scheduled for 2023, but was later delayed due to "production circumstances", and eventually aired from April 9 to June 25, 2024, on AT-X and other networks. The opening theme song is "Yōbigoe" (呼び声, Call), performed by Tei, while the ending theme song is "blan_", performed by Arika, a music unit composed of voice actress Yūko Natsuyoshi and composer and guitarist Yamato. Crunchyroll streamed the series.

Following the final episode of the first season, a second season was announced, and aired from January 7 to March 25, 2025. The opening theme song is "Unsung ballad", performed by True, while the ending theme song is "inclusion", performed by Arika.

== Reception ==
Rebecca Silverman from Anime News Network praised the ending of the first volume and its illustrations, while also criticizing the start. Demelza from Anime UK News had similar feelings, while also praising the characters.

In the Kono Light Novel ga Sugoi! guidebook, the series ranked first in the tankōbon category in 2020.

Anime News Network listed the first season of the anime series as an entry for "The Worst Anime of 2024". Furthermore, Rebecca Silverman points out failure in the animation, and "stripped-down adaptation that sucked every last bit of romantic tension from the story" as well as "sped-run plot".

== See also ==
- A Tale of the Secret Saint, a light novel series with the same illustrator
