= Nigojū =

Japanese novelist

- 二語十
- Born: Fukuoka Prefecture, Japan
- Occupation: Novelist
- Writing career
- Period: 2019 –
- Genres: Light novel, mystery
- Notable work: The Detective Is Already Dead (2019)
- Notable awards: 15th MF Bunko J Light Novel Newcomer Award – Grand Prize

Nigojū (二語十) is a Japanese light novelist. He is from and currently resides in the Fukuoka Prefecture.

== Biography ==
After failing his university entrance examination and waiting for the next year to reapply, Nigojū frequented the light novel section at his local bookstore where, after seeing the promotional video for the series, picked up Oreimo and became fully immersed in the art form. He then gradually started writing his own light novels. In his third year of university, he began responding to open calls for writing positions, but was not chosen.

Influenced from the success of Saekano: How to Raise a Boring Girlfriend, he formed a dōjin circle and began taking part in events such as Comiket. About two years later, with the desire for commercial success, he started submitting to open calls again. On 31 December 2018, he submitted The Detective Is Already Dead for the 15th MF Bunko J Light Novel Newcomer Award and won the grand prize, later debuting with this series in November 2019.

Nigojū states his influences are mostly romantic comedy light novel series such as Oreimo, My Youth Romantic Comedy Is Wrong, As I Expected, and Saekano: How to Raise a Boring Girlfriend.

His pen name, he says, was inspired from the origin of Sanjugo Naoki's pen name. Sanjūgo (三十五), meaning 35, was the age Naoki was when he decided on that particular name, and because Nigojū was 25 at the time, he thought he would make his pen name Nijūgo (二十五). However, he felt like it sounded arrogant to have his name similar to a writer as influential as Naoki, so he changed the kanji and reading to Nigojū (二語十).

== Bibliography ==
- The Detective Is Already Dead (探偵はもう、死んでいる。, Tantei wa Mō, Shinde Iru.) (Illustrated by Umibōzu, published by Media Factory, 12 volumes)
