= Wandmaker of the Ruined World =

Japanese light novel series

- First light novel volume cover

崩壊世界の魔法杖職人 (Hōkai Sekai no Mahōzue Shokunin)
- Genre: Fantasy; Post-apocalyptic
- Novel series
- Written by: Hagane Kurodome
- Published by: Shōsetsuka ni Narō
- Original run: October 28, 2024 – September 27, 2025
- Light novel
- Written by: Hagane Kurodome
- Illustrated by: Kayahara
- Published by: Media Factory
- English publisher: NA: Seven Seas Entertainment
- Imprint: MF Bunko J
- Original run: September 25, 2025 – present
- Volumes: 4
- Manga
- Written by: Hagane Kurodome
- Illustrated by: Nori Kazato
- Published by: Kadokawa Shoten
- English publisher: NA: Seven Seas Entertainment
- Imprint: Kadokawa Comics A
- Magazine: Young Ace Up
- Original run: September 24, 2025 – present
- Volumes: 1

Wandmaker of the Ruined World (崩壊世界の魔法杖職人, Hōkai Sekai no Mahōzue Shokunin) is a Japanese light novel series written by Hagane Kurodome and illustrated by Kayahara. It was originally serialized as a web novel on Shōsetsuka ni Narō from October 2024 to September 2025. It was later acquired by Media Factory who began publishing it under their MF Bunko J imprint in September 2025. A manga adaptation illustrated by Nori Kazato began serialization on Kadokawa Shoten's Young Ace Up website in September 2025.

== Synopsis ==
Kenshi Ori is an inventor who lives in Okutama isolated from the rest of society. As society collapses due to the presence of meteorites that crashed into Earth's surface, which causes the electricity surrounding Tokyo to shut down, Kenshi finds that the meteorites have also impacted his inventions, one of which resembles a wand. He later finds that the wand now carries magical energy that could be used in order to replace technology.

== Characters ==
Kenshi Ori (大利賢師, Ōri Kenshi)
Voiced by: Haruki Ishiya (voice comic)
The Blue Witch (青の魔女, Ao no Majo)
Voiced by: Saya Aizawa (PV, voice comic)

== Media ==
=== Light novel ===
Written by Hagane Kurodome, Wandmaker of the Ruined World was originally serialized on Shōsetsuka ni Narō from October 28, 2024 to September 27, 2025. It was later acquired by Media Factory who began publishing the series with illustrations by Kayahara under their MF Bunko J light novel imprint on September 25, 2025. Four volumes have been released as of July 24, 2026.

In May 2026, Seven Seas Entertainment announced that they had licensed the series for digital-only English publication, with the first volume set to release in March 2027.

| No. | Original release date | Original ISBN | North American release date | North American ISBN |
|---|---|---|---|---|
| 1 | September 25, 2025 | 978-4-04-684981-6; 978-4-04-685289-2 (SE) | March 4, 2027 (digital) | — |
| 2 | November 25, 2025 | 978-4-04-684982-3; 978-4-04-685509-1 (SE) | — | — |
| 3 | March 25, 2026 | 978-4-04-660053-0 | — | — |
| 4 | July 24, 2026 | 978-4-04-660218-3 | — | — |

=== Manga ===
A manga adaptation illustrated by Nori Kazato began serialization on Kadokawa Shoten's Young Ace Up website on September 24, 2025. The manga's chapters have been compiled into a single tankōbon volume as of March 2026.

In August 2026, Seven Seas Entertainment announced that they had also licensed the manga for English publication, with the first volume releasing in May 2027.

| No. | Original release date | Original ISBN | English release date | English ISBN |
|---|---|---|---|---|
| 1 | March 26, 2026 | 978-4-04-117129-5 | May 25, 2027 | 979-8-90209-900-0 |

=== Other ===
In commemoration of the release of the manga's first volume and the light novel's third volume, a promotional video and voice comic adaptation were uploaded to the Kadokawa YouTube channel in March 2026. The voice comic featured voice acting from Haruki Ishiya and Saya Aizawa, while the promotional video featured narration from Aizawa.

== Reception ==
The series was ranked second in the tankōbon category at the 2025 Next Light Novel Awards.
