= Koikimo =

Japanese illustration collection and its adaptations

- Koi to Yobu ni wa Kimochi Warui
- Cover of Koi to Yobu ni wa Kimochi Warui volume 1 by Ichijinsha featuring Ichika Arima (left) and Ryo Amakusa (right)

恋と呼ぶには気持ち悪い
- Genre: Romantic comedy
- Manga
- Written by: Mogusu
- Published by: Ichijinsha
- Magazine: Comic Pool
- Original run: January 25, 2015 – March 25, 2021
- Volumes: 8
- Anime television series
- Directed by: Naomi Nakayama
- Produced by: Shunsuke Saito
- Written by: Yūko Kakihara
- Music by: Hiroaki Tsutsumi
- Studio: Nomad
- Licensed by: Crunchyroll
- Original network: AT-X, Tokyo MX, UHB, MRT, GTV, GYT, BS Fuji
- Original run: April 5, 2021 – June 21, 2021
- Episodes: 12
- icon

Koikimo, short for Koi to Yobu ni wa Kimochi Warui (恋と呼ぶには気持ち悪い; "It's Disgusting to Call This Love"), is a Japanese romantic comedy illustration collection by Mogusu. It was first uploaded on Pixiv until it got an online manga serialization on Ichijinsha's Comic Pool digital manga magazine in January 2015. Eight tankōbon volumes were released between January 2015 and March 2021. An anime television series adaptation produced by Nomad premiered on March 29, 2021, on streaming platforms and on television from April 5 to June 21, 2021.

== Plot ==
Ryo Amakusa is a successful but womanizing businessman, and Ichika Arima, a high school girl, is best friends with his younger sister. Ichika saves Ryo from falling down a staircase on a rainy day, and she later encounters him again at his home while visiting his sister. He attempts to repay her with flirtatious advances, only to be harshly rejected. Shocked by her blunt disgust, Ryo unexpectedly falls in love with her. From then on, Ryo persistently pursues Ichika with overly direct confessions and grand romantic gestures, while Ichika continues to respond with insults and irritation. Despite her reactions, Ryo sincerely tries to change himself and prove his feelings are genuine.

== Characters ==
Ichika Arima (有馬一花, Arima Ichika)
Voiced by: Yurie Kozakai
A 16 year old high school student who, after saving Ryo from falling down the stairs and giving him her lunch, ends up receiving Ryo's enthusiastic approaches. Her name means "one flower" and probably because of this, Ryo sends her one flower a day to her house as a way to prove his feelings. While rejecting Ryo everytime he approaches her, Ichika doesn't seem to mind Ryo's presence.
Ryo Amakusa (天草亮, Amakusa Ryō)
Voiced by: Toshiyuki Toyonaga
A 26 year old womanizer salaryman who falls in love with Ichika after receiving a cold reply from her when offering his own body as gratitude for saving him.
Rio Amakusa (天草理緒, Amakusa Rio)
Voiced by: Rena Hasegawa
Ryo's younger sister and Ichika's best friend and classmate who is supportive of her brother's feelings.
Kai Tamaru (多丸快, Tamaru Kai)
Voiced by: Junya Enoki
Ichika's classmate who develops feelings for her.
Arie Matsushima (松島有枝, Matsushima Arie)
Voiced by: Kana Hanazawa
Ryo's colleague at work who has feelings for him.
Masuda (益田, Masuda)
Voiced by: Ryōhei Kimura
Ryo's best friend since middle school and he is a photographer.

== Media ==
=== Manga ===
The series is written and illustrated by Mogusu. It was first uploaded on Pixiv until it got an online manga serialization on Ichijinsha's Comic Pool digital manga magazine in January 2015. Eight tankōbon volumes were released between January 2015 and March 2021.

No.	Japanese release date	Japanese ISBN
1	February 2, 2016	978-475801-483-0
2	November 17, 2016	978-475801-531-8
3	July 4, 2017	978-475801-559-2
4	January 19, 2018	978-475801-584-4
5	July 17, 2018	978-475801-609-4
6	February 14, 2019	978-475801-629-2
7	January 24, 2020	978-475801-680-3
8	March 25, 2021	978-475801-714-5

=== Anime ===
An anime television series adaptation was announced by Ichijinsha on January 21, 2020. The series is animated by Nomad and directed by Naomi Nakayama, with Taku Yamada serving as assistant director. Yūko Kakihara overseeing scripts, Mariko Fujita designed the characters and serve as chief animation director, and Hiroaki Tsutsumi composed the music. The series aired from April 5 to June 21, 2021, on AT-X, Tokyo MX, UHB, MRT, GTV, GYT, and BS Fuji. The series premiered on March 29, 2021, on streaming platforms. Ace Collection performed the series' opening theme song "Monoqlo City", while MaRuRi to Ryuga performed the series' ending theme song "Linaria". Crunchyroll licensed the series outside of Southeast Asia.

==== Episodes ====
No.	Title	Directed by	Written by	Original release date (Note: Episodes are released on streaming platforms a week before their original air date on television.)
1	"He's Not Entirely Bad"; Transliteration: "Warui Hito de wa" (Japanese: 悪い人では)	Taku Yamada	Yūko Kakihara	April 5, 2021
On a rainy day, the elite salaryman Amakusa Ryo almost falls down some stairs when he is saved by an ordinary high school girl named Arima Ichika. Ryo was dizzy from not eating breakfast, which worries Ichika and she offers him her lunch then runs off. Later when Ryo gets home, Ichika is in his living room and he finds out that she is actually his sister Rio's classmate. Ryo wants to thank Ichika for saving his life and offers to kiss her...
2	"He Smelled Like Cologne"; Transliteration: "Kōsui no Nioi" (Japanese: 香水の匂い)	Kōsuke Yano, Takuma Suzuki	Yūko Kakihara	April 12, 2021
Waiting for Ryo to come home from work was Ichika in an apron. Ryo was exhausted and started daydreaming, but Ichika came to Rio's house with her classmates Ruri and Satsuna. Satsuna and Ruri get infatuated with Ryo, who was wearing a suit and showing endearing features. On the other hand, Ryo's old friend and photographer Masuda learns that Ryo is reaching out to a high school girl due to wind rumors, and tries to confirm with Ryo directly.
3	"You're Just Messing With Me"; Transliteration: "Karakatterun ja" (Japanese: からかってるんじゃ)	Yūsuke Onoda	Yūko Kakihara	April 19, 2021
Ichika hits volleyball on the face of her classmate, Kai Tamaru, during a physical education class. When I went to apologize for reading alone during the break, the book was the original book of an anime that Ichihana loves. Kai promises to lend the original book to Ichihana. That night, when Ryo rushes to send Ichihana, who is shopping at a convenience store, to his house, he happens to be happy there, and Ryo learns that Kai will lend a book to Ichihana. Ryo stops the pleasure of leaving after giving a nod, "At school tomorrow."
4	"On This Holy Night"; Transliteration: "Seinaru Yoru ni" (Japanese: 聖なる夜に)	Keisuke Nishijima	Yūko Kakihara	April 26, 2021
As Christmas and school trips approached, Ichihana was in love with Rio and others. When asked what type of man she likes, Ichihana thinks of Ryo and says the opposite image of Ryo. May points out that the characteristics fit nicely and perfectly ... On the other hand, Ryo, who was calling Ichihana at the company, was eavesdropped by a female subordinate who called him "Ichihana-san" under his name and confessed that he liked it over the phone.
5	"Pilgrimage"; Transliteration: "Seichi Junrei" (Japanese: 聖地巡礼)	Taku Yamada	Yūko Kakihara	May 3, 2021
Ichika and Rio go to Okinawa for a school trip. Masuda ends up coming along with one of his seniors at work to be their camera guy on their trip. Rio had been sending pictures to Ryo from their trip, which ends up reminding Ryo of Kai and he gets worried. Meanwhile, Ryo ends up picking up an anime keychain that his coworker Matsushima Arie had dropped and she asks him to not let anyone at work know about her hobbies, and he has something nice to say in return...
6	"Unrequited Love"; Transliteration: "Kataomoitte" (Japanese: 片思いって)	Shinpei Nagai, Naruto Uzumaki, Kazuho Kunimoto, Hideki Takayama	Yūko Kakihara	May 10, 2021
Ryo's coworker Arie has been working as long as he has and is a secret anime nerd. They get a little closer after they talk about some anime. Arie starts to realize that she has feelings for Ryo and invites him out to dinner with some other coworkers. Meanwhile, Ryo drives Rio to Ichika's house after he finds out she's spending the night there. Ryo gives Ichika's mother various presents, making her ask him to come inside, but...
7	"Love for Your Fave"; Transliteration: "Oshi e no Ai" (Japanese: 推しへの愛)	Kōsuke Yano, Takuma Suzuki	Yūko Kakihara	May 17, 2021
Kai goes to the bookstore to buy the new volume of "Forward World." When he gets there, he sees Ryo and immediately tries to avoid him. He remembers what Rio said about her brother to him and feels a little down, but when he goes in to grab one of the copies of the new volume, his hand touches Ryo's hand. Meanwhile, Arie manages to secure the new volume at another store and she runs into Ichika. They realize they have the same favorite character and end up bonding. On her way home, Arie is thinking of Ryo and she realizes something.
8	"The Person I Love Is ..."; Transliteration: "Suki na Hito wa" (Japanese: 好きな人は)	Shinpei Nagai	Yūko Kakihara	May 24, 2021
On the morning of Valentine's Day, Ryo is waiting by the front door like some pet waiting for their owner to come home. Ichika finally comes by and tells him that she spent days trying to figure out what to get him for Valentine's Day other than chocolate and she gives him something rather surprising. After getting to school, Ichika meets up with her friends and they exchange chocolates. Kai receives a message from Ichika asking if they can meet during lunch. Meanwhile, Arie also had prepared some chocolates and...
9	"My Answer"; Transliteration: "Jibun no Kotae" (Japanese: 自分の答え)	Yūsuke Onoda	Yuki Ikeda	May 31, 2021
Kai and Ichika meet at the station on Saturday so that she can tell him her reply after he asked her out. Ryo coincidentally passes by and finds out the reason that Ichika seemed troubled lately is because Kai had asked her out. Meanwhile, Arie invites Ryo to dinner so that she can tell him how she feels. She brings up the fact that even if Ryo and Ichika did go out, their age gap might just make them both suffer, and then gently places her hand on his...
10	"Being Prepared to Be Hurt"; Transliteration: "Kizutsuku Kakugo" (Japanese: 傷つく覚悟)	Naruto Uzumaki	Yuki Ikeda	June 7, 2021
Arie tells Ryo about her feelings, saying, "I want to make an effort to make myself like me even if I have a crush." From the perspective of the world, Ryo is more realistic to go out with Arie, and it makes me wonder if Ichihana will not suffer because of the difference in age. However, Masuda, who was rarely invited by Ryo to drink at home, advises Ryo, "I'm not prepared and I'm thinking only about myself. I should act in good faith." Around that time, Ryo's father came home for the first time in a while ...
11	"High Schooler"; Transliteration: "Kōkōsei" (Japanese: 高校生)	Rin Teraoka	Yūko Kakihara	June 14, 2021
Ichika and her classmates were going to be third-years after their spring break. Rio tells them that she plans on becoming a lawyer and Ichika starts panicking because she doesn't know what she wants to do yet. Ichika asks Ryo how he decided what college he'd go to and Ryo remembers the argument he and his father had when they were younger and tells her that he just followed the path that his parents had laid out for him. While at home having dinner with his family, Ryo's father discovers Ryo's feelings for Ichika and...
12	"You're Creepy"; Transliteration: "Kimochi Warui" (Japanese: 気持ち悪い)	Taku Yamada, Yūsuke Onoda, Naomi Nakayama	Yūko Kakihara	June 21, 2021
A few days after they went flower viewing, Ichika is anxious because she hasn't heard from Ryo since and she decides to talk to Rio about it. Rio tells Ichika that she should try contacting him herself, which Ichika is rather nervous about. Rio tells her that she feels sorry for her brother because Ichika won't make up her mind on how she feels about Ryo. Ichika builds up the courage and finally calls Ryo, but he tells her that he's busy with work and won't be able to talk to her for a while as if he's trying to keep his distance from her...

=== Stage play ===
A stage play adaptation of the manga was announced in February 2024. It is scheduled to run in Tokyo from April 26–May 5, and in Osaka from May 10–12, 2024. The play will be directed and written by Naohiro Ise. The cast includes Yuna Shibata as Ichika Arima, Hiroki Uchi as Ryō Amakusa, Yayoi Tatsumoto as Rio Amakusa, Mizuki Chiba as Masuda, Ryōki Nagae as Kai Tamaru, and Chiaki Omigawa as Arie Matsushima.
