= I'm Living with an Otaku NEET Kunoichi!? =

Japanese manga series

- First tankōbon volume cover, featuring Shizuri Ideura

ニートくノ一となぜか同棲はじめました (Nīto Kunoichi to Nazeka Dōsei Hajimemashita)
- Genre: Romantic comedy; Supernatural
- Manga
- Written by: Kotatsu; Yakitomato
- Illustrated by: Kotatsu
- Published by: Self-published (webcomic); No. 9 (digital); ASCII Media Works (print)
- Imprint: Dengeki Comics EX
- Magazine: No. 9 Comic
- Original run: January 25, 2020 – present
- Volumes: 12 (digital); 4 (print)
- Anime television series
- Directed by: Hisashi Saitō
- Written by: Takashi Aoshima
- Music by: CMJK
- Studio: Quad
- Licensed by: Sentai Filmworks: SA/SEA: Medialink
- Original network: Tokyo MX, BS11, SUN, KBS Kyoto, AT-X, HTB
- Original run: January 5, 2025 – June 22, 2025
- Episodes: 24
- icon

I'm Living with an Otaku NEET Kunoichi!? (ニートくノ一となぜか同棲はじめました, Nīto Kunoichi to Nazeka Dōsei Hajimemashita; lit. 'For Some Reason I Started Living with a NEET Kunoichi') is a Japanese web manga series storyboarded by Yakitomato and illustrated by Kotatsu. Kotatsu started publishing the manga on his Twitter account in January 2020, and started publishing it on Niconico Seiga's No. 9 Comic in February of that same year. ASCII Media Works started publishing the volumes in print in August 2021. An anime television series adaptation produced by Quad aired from January to June 2025.

== Plot ==
Shizuri Ideura is a kunoichi protecting others from Yoma who acts as Tsukasa Atsumi's servant in exchange for living with him as his gamer NEET roommate. Shizuri must rely on Tsukasa for basic necessities as she lacks any money of her own, leading to chaotic events when she is left alone. During her stay, fellow kunoichi Ayame Momochi and Hina Izumi come to visit Shizuri from the village, the former having an unhealthy obsession with Shizuri. The main duo like playing games with one another, so Tsukasa buys Shizuri a gaming computer on a date. Shizuri learns during the date that Tsukasa appreciates her, something Shizuri is reluctant to reciprocate.

As a result of Hina's bad luck magic being encouraged by an antagonistic Kanna Natsumi, Tsukasa's apartment explodes and Saya Hazuki, the landlady, forces the ninjas to pay one million yen to repair the damages by making them work as maids in her cafeteria. Shizuri refuses to partake in this and Kanna helps Saya's business grow. Irritated by Shizuri's laziness, Saya hires Shizuri to work as a maid at the cafe alongside Kanna, completely exhausting Shizuri, who has to work despite her NEET lifestyle. High-ranking Yoma named Killa and Clena Ventor attack Tsukasa and Shizuri, requiring Tsukasa to use his powers and heal her, which allows Shizuri to defeat the Yoma at the expense of her energy. Shizuri and Tsukasa share their first kiss and Shizuri is accepted as a NEET during the attack.

Feeling responsible for Shizuri's misfortune, Saya, who is actually Shizuri's mother, tells the others to take care of her. Shizuri's NEET lifestyle is revealed to be a result of her childhood connection with Tsukasa, who influenced her to become the gamer that she is known as in the present. Later on, Yuzu Natsumi, younger sister of Kanna, shows up at her maid job in protest. Yuzu accepts Kanna's job knowing it is to save their village but dislikes participating in it herself. Himari Asakura, a schoolgirl stalking Shizuri and Tsukasa, confronts Shizuri on her relationship when seeing Tsukasa with Saya, causing Shizuri to dislike Himari for disrespecting her privacy. Shizuri and the other ninjas then host a drinking party, causing them all to act on their basest desires, while Ayame is kicked out of Tsukasa's apartment for her perverted obsessions with Shizuri. Eventually, Shizuri and Tsukasa confess to one another, moments before the Ventors return and ruin the moment, infuriating Shizuri.

== Characters ==
Shizuri Ideura (出浦 白津莉, Ideura Shizuri)
Voiced by: Hinaki Yano (Japanese); Alyssa Marek (English)
A former genius kunoichi. She was a skilled demon fighter and considered a candidate to become the next leader of Ideura Village, one of the three major ninja schools, but in reality she is a NEET otaku who loves games. She rescues Tsukasa when he is attacked by a demon and makes a master-servant contract with him on the condition that she will stay with him. She is an elite NEET by birth, and would like to live her life playing games if possible.
Tsukasa Atsumi (安海 政, Atsumi Tsukasa)
Voiced by: Shōya Ishige (Japanese); Adam Gibbs (English)
He is an ordinary, average office worker. One day, Shizuri protects him from a demon, which leads to him starting to live with her. He is actually descended from a samurai family that has fought against demons since ancient times, making him vulnerable to attacks by demons. Perhaps because of this, he has had a string of misfortunes and has low self-esteem. However, he is good at all kinds of housework.
Ayame Momochi (百地 彩夢, Momochi Ayame)
Voiced by: Fairouz Ai (Japanese); Karlii Hoch (English)
A chunin kunoichi from Ideura Village. She worships Shizuri, and is searching for her after she left the village. Although she is an excellent kunoichi, her abnormal love for Shizuri often results in people looking at her with murderous intent, but she sees this as a reward.
Hina Izumi (和泉 緋那, Izumi Hina)
Voiced by: Saya Aizawa (Japanese); Natalie Rial (English)
A genin kunoichi from Ideura Village. When she becomes negative, she has an infectious misfortune that brings various misfortunes to those around her. She violates the village's taboo of falling in love with her master with whom she has a master-servant contract, and asks Shizuri for help. As a genin, she has poor taijutsu skills, but her pure ninjutsu power boasts the potential to be more than that of a chunin.
Kanna Natsumi (夏見 叶愛, Natsumi Kanna)
Voiced by: Hina Kino (Japanese); Katelyn Barr (English)
She is the leader of Natsumi Village and calls herself Shizuri's rival. She has friendly relations with Ideura Village and is Shizuri's childhood friend, and although she always challenges her to a duel, she has never been victorious. Although she is arrogant and harsh towards others, she is a caring big sister type.
Tōru Nakayama (中山透, Nakayama Tōru)
Voiced by: Sho Nogami (Japanese); Gabriel Regojo (English)
He is an office worker who has a master-servant contract with Hina. He dotes on her so much that he tolerates her tendency to be unlucky. Due to a transfer, he moves in with Hina into the apartment where Tsukasa and her family live.
Himari Asakura (朝倉陽葵, Asakura Himari)
Voiced by: Manatsu Murakami (Japanese); Cat Thomas (English)
An ordinary high school girl who lives in the same apartment building as Tsukasa. She is an avid rom-com fan who dreams of adult romance. She has her love sensors all over her body in order to explore her own path in rom-coms.
Saya Hazuki (葉月沙耶, Hazuki Saya)
Voiced by: Yui Horie (Japanese); Patricia Duran (English)
Former leader of the "underground unit" of Ideura Village. She served as Shizuri's instructor. She is also the landlord of the apartment where Tsukasa and his friends live.
Killa Ventor (キラー・ヴェントール, Kirā Buentōru)
Voiced by: Mayu Sagara (Japanese); Olivia Swasey (English)
A high-ranking demon who came to the human world to hunt the souls of shinobi. Her abilities are well-known, but she worries about her cute real name.
Clena Ventor (クレナ・ヴェントール, Kurena Buentōru)
Voiced by: Yurie Kozakai (Japanese); Brittney Karbowski (English)
A high-ranking demon who came to the human world with Killa. She eats anything she gets the chance to, and has a laid-back personality that is hard to believe she is a demon.

== Media ==
=== Manga ===
Storyboarded by Yakitomato and illustrated by Kotatsu, I'm Living with an Otaku NEET Kunoichi!? was first published by Kotatsu on his Twitter account on January 25, 2020; it has also been published on Niconico Seiga's No. 9 Comic since February 22 of the same year. No. 9 published the first volume digitally on August 7, 2020. Twelve volumes have been released as of May 16, 2025. ASCII Media Works started publishing it in print tankōbon volumes on August 27, 2021. Four volumes have been released as of December 27, 2024.

=== Anime ===
On February 10, 2024 (on NEET Day), it was announced that the series would receive an anime television series adaptation produced by Quad. It is directed by Hisashi Saitō, with scripts by Takashi Aoshima, character designs by Masahiko Suzuki, and music composed by CMJK. The series is narrated by Shigeru Chiba. The series aired from January 5 to June 22, 2025, on Tokyo MX and other networks. (Note: Tokyo MX and BS11 listed the series premiere on January 4, 2025, at 25:30, which is effectively January 5 at 1:30 a.m. JST.) The series' opening theme song is "Neet In Jam", performed by Real Akiba Boyz loves Shoko Nakagawa (a group consisting of Nakagawa and the b-boy dance unit Real Akiba Boyz). For the first cours, the first ending theme song is "NEETopia", performed by Hinaki Yano as her character Shizuri Ideura. For the second cours, the second ending theme song is "Darashinai Everyday", performed by Yano, Fairouz Ai, Saya Aizawa, Hina Kino as their respective characters.

Sentai Filmworks licensed the series in North America, Australia and British Isles for streaming on Hidive. An English dub premiered on June 25, 2025. Medialink licensed the series in South and Southeast Asia for streaming on Ani-One Asia's YouTube channel.

==== Episodes ====
No.	Title	Directed by (Note: Production staff information is taken from the ending credits of each episode.)	Written by	Storyboarded by	Original release date (Note: Hidive and Ani-One Asia streams two half-length episodes combined per episode.)
1	"Somehow I Started Living with an Otaku NEET Kunoichi"; Transliteration: "Nīto Kunoichi to Nazeka Dōsei Hajimemashita" (Japanese: ニートくノ一となぜか同棲はじめました)	Mizuki Iwadare	Takashi Aoshima	Hisashi Saitō	January 5, 2025
2	"Somehow a Perverted Kunoichi Showed Up"; Transliteration: "Naze ka Hentai Katagi no Kunoichi ga Kimashita" (Japanese: なぜか変態気質のくノ一が来ました)	Mizuki Iwadare	Takashi Aoshima	Hisashi Saitō	January 12, 2025
3	"Somehow a Kunoichi with Very Bad Luck Showed Up"; Transliteration: "Naze ka Fukō Taishitsu no Kunoichi ga Kimashita" (Japanese: なぜか不幸体質のくノ一が来ました)	Mizuki Sakuma	Yasunori Yamada	Katsuhiko Nishijima	January 19, 2025
4	"Somehow I was Targeted by a CPL Kunoichi"; Transliteration: "Naze ka CPL no Kunoichi ni Nerawaremashita" (Japanese: なぜかCPLのくの一に狙われました)	Mizuki Sakuma	Kenji Sugihara	Katsuhiko Nishijima	January 26, 2025
5	"For Some Reason Kunoichi Lovers Moved In"; Transliteration: "Naze ka Koibito Kunoichi-tachi ga Hikkoshitekimashita" (Japanese: なぜか恋人くの一たちが引っ越してきました)	Takashi Andō	Takamitsu Kōno	Hisashi Saitō	February 2, 2025
6	"Somehow a Rom-Com Loving High School Girl was Monitoring Me"; Transliteration: "Naze ka Rabu Kome Zuki no JK ni Kanshisaremashita" (Japanese: なぜかラブコメ好きのJKに監視されました)	Takashi Andō	Takashi Aoshima	Hisashi Saitō	February 9, 2025
7	"Somehow I Suffered for a Date"; Transliteration: "Naze ka Dēto ni Iku Tame ni Shikuhakkushimashita" (Japanese: なぜかデ一トに行くために四苦八苦しました)	Sumito Sasaki	Takamitsu Kōno	Royden B	February 16, 2025
8	"Somehow I Fully Enjoyed My Akiba Date"; Transliteration: "Naze ka Akiba de Dēto o Mankitsu Shimashita" (Japanese: なぜかアキバでデ一トを満喫しました)	Sumito Sasaki	Takamitsu Kōno	Royden B	February 23, 2025
9	"Somehow the High School Girl Reached a New Love Frontier"; Transliteration: "Naze ka JK ga LOVE no Shin Kyōchi o Hirakimashita" (Japanese: なぜかJKがLOVEの新境地を関きました)	Chen Xiaocan	Takashi Aoshima	Katsuhiko Nishijima	March 2, 2025
10	"Somehow a Tsundere Kunoichi Showed Up"; Transliteration: "Naze ka Tsunde-shina Kunoichi ga Kimashita" (Japanese: なぜかツンデしなくノ一が来ました)	Chen Xiaocan	Kenji Sugihara	Katsuhiko Nishijima	March 9, 2025
11	"Somehow a Kunoichi Maid Burst Onto the Scene"; Transliteration: "Naze ka Meido na Kunoichi ga Kimashita" (Japanese: なぜかメイドなくノ一が来ました)	Mizuki Iwadare	Kenji Sugihara	Mizuki Iwadare	March 16, 2025
12	"Somehow I Decided to Quit Being a NEET"; Transliteration: "Naze ka Nīto o Yameru Koto ni Narimashita" (Japanese: なぜかニートをやめることになりました)	Mizuki Iwadare	Yasunori Yamada	Mizuki Iwadare	March 23, 2025
13	"Somehow the Former NEET Did Her Best with Chores and Work"; Transliteration: "Naze ka Kaji ya Shigoto o Moto Nīto wa Ganbarimashita" (Japanese: なぜか家事や仕事を元ニートは頑張りました)	NAMU Animation, Directorial Department of JFK	Yasunori Yamada	Hisashi Saitō	April 6, 2025
14	"Somehow the Strongest Assassin Appeared"; Transliteration: "Naze ka Saikyō no Kishaku ga Yattekimashita" (Japanese: なぜか最強の刺客がやってきました)	NAMU Animation, Directorial Department of JFK	Kenji Sugihara	Hisashi Saitō	April 13, 2025
15	"Somehow This Became a Fighting Anime"; Transliteration: "Naze ka Batoru Anime ni Narimashita" (Japanese: なぜかバトルアニメになりました)	Sumito Sasaki	Kenji Sugihara	Hisashi Saitō	April 20, 2025
16	"Somehow Supporting Characters Have Started to Shine"; Transliteration: "Naze ka Sabu Kyara ga Kagayaki Hajimemashita" (Japanese: なぜかサブキャラが輝きはじめました)	Sumito Sasaki	Takashi Aoshima	Hisashi Saitō	April 27, 2025
17	"Somehow I was Asked to Continue Being a NEET"; Transliteration: "Naze ka Nīto o Tsuzukete Hoshī to Onegaisaremashita" (Japanese: なぜかニートを続けて欲しいとお願いされました)	Mizuki Sakuma	Takashi Aoshima	Katsuhiko Nishijima	May 4, 2025
18	"Somehow an Old Story Began"; Transliteration: "Naze ka Mukashibanashi o Hajimemashita" (Japanese: なぜか昔話をはじめました)	Mizuki Sakuma	Takashi Aoshima	Katsuhiko Nishijima	May 11, 2025
19	"Somehow There Was Bedlam in the Bathhouse"; Transliteration: "Naze ka Sentō de Sentō ga Boppatsu Shimashita" (Japanese: なぜか銭湯で戦闘が勃発しました)	Takashi Andō	Takamitsu Kōno	Chen Dali	May 18, 2025
20	"Somehow the Tsundere Kunoichi’s Sister Showed Up"; Transliteration: "Naze ka Tsundere Kunoichi no Imōto ga Yattekimashita" (Japanese: なぜかツンデレくの一の妹がやってきました)	Sumito Sasaki	Yasunori Yamada	Takashi Andō	May 25, 2025
21	"Somehow the Troublesome Sisters Spoke of Their Memories"; Transliteration: "Naze ka Kojirase Shimai ga Omoidebanashi o Shimashita" (Japanese: なぜかこじらせ姉妹が思い出話をしました)	Sumito Sasaki	Yasunori Yamada	Shinichi Watanabe	June 1, 2025
22	"Somehow I Started a Neighbourhood Friendship with a High School Girl I'm Basically Meeting for a First Time"; Transliteration: "Naze ka Hobo Shotaimen no JK to go-Kinjo Tsukiai Hajimemashita" (Japanese: なぜかほぼ初対面のJKとご近所付き合いはじめました)	Takashi Andō	Takashi Aoshima	Katsuhiko Nishijima	June 8, 2025
23	"Somehow Perversion and Bad Luck Became a Team"; Transliteration: "Naze ka Hentai to Fukō wa Hitotsu ni Narimashita" (Japanese: なぜか変態と不幸はひとつになりました)	Mizuki Iwadare	Takamitsu Kōno	Shinichi Watanabe	June 15, 2025
24	"The NEET Kunoichi Somehow Had a Drinking Party"; Transliteration: "Nīto Kunoichi-tachi to Naze ka Nomikai Hajimemashita" (Japanese: ニートくノ一たちとなぜか飲み会はじめました)	Mizuki Iwadare	Takashi Aoshima	Shinichi Watanabe	June 22, 2025
25 (OVA 1)	"Somehow I Got Flustered at the Beach"; Transliteration: "Naze ka Bīchi de Dogimagi Shimashita" (Japanese: なぜかビーチでドギマギしました)	Mizuki Sakuma	Takashi Aoshima	Shinichi Watanabe	September 3, 2025
26 (OVA 2)	"Somehow I Got Close to Advanced-Level Yoma"; Transliteration: "Naze ka Moto Kōtō Yōma to Nakayoku Narimashita" (Japanese: なぜか元高等妖魔と仲良くなりました)	Mizuki Sakuma	Takashi Aoshima	Shinichi Watanabe	October 8, 2025
