= My Girlfriend's Friend =

Japanese manga series

- First tankōbon volume cover

彼女の友達 (Kanojo no Tomodachi)
- Manga
- Written by: Jura
- Published by: Kodansha
- Imprint: Young Magazine KC
- Magazine: YanMaga Web
- Original run: May 21, 2021 – present
- Volumes: 7
- Anime television series
- Directed by: Takashi Andō
- Written by: Gokō Shiraki
- Studio: Quad
- Licensed by: OceanVeil
- Original network: Tokyo MX, BS11 (censored)
- Original run: October 5, 2026 – present
- Episodes: 6
- icon

My Girlfriend's Friend (Japanese: 彼女の友達, Hepburn: Kanojo no Tomodachi) is a Japanese manga series written and illustrated by Jura. It began serialization on Kodansha's YanMaga Web online service in May 2021, with seven volumes published as of July 2026. An anime television series adaptation produced by Quad premiered in October 2026.

== Plot ==
The series follows Takeru Hidaka, a high school student who is currently in a relationship with his classmate Kaori Koga. One day, Tomoko Yoshioka, Kaori's best friend, invites herself to join the two during their karaoke date. During the date, Tomoko starts seducing Takeru, asking him to start a relationship with her. Despite Takeru's initial hesitation, claiming his loyalty to Kaori, he finds her too attractive and reluctantly starts cheating on Kaori with her.

== Characters ==
Takeru Hidaka (日髙 タケル, Hidaka Takeru)
Voiced by: Ryūga Nagaike
Kaori's classmate and boyfriend, he is a high school student who wears glasses. He is planning to enter medical school after graduation.
Kaori Koga (古河 カオリ, Koga Kaori)
Voiced by: Sayaka Hashi
Takeru's classmate and girlfriend. The two began dating after she confessed to him, but in reality, Takeru had always been more interested in Tomoko.
Tomoko Yoshioka (吉岡 トモコ, Yoshioka Tomoko)
Voiced by: Miki Hase
Takeru and Kaori's classmate, and Kaori's best friend. Takeru often glanced at her in school but had been unable to make a move on her at first. After the karaoke date, he starts a secret relationship with her.
Miyuki (ミユキ)
Voiced by: Riho Sugiyama
Kaori's mother (カオリの母, Kaori no Haha)
Voiced by: Ryoka Yuzuki

== Media ==
=== Manga ===
The series is written and illustrated by Jura, a manga artist who was previously noted for their adult doujin works. It began serialization on Kodansha's YanMaga Web service on May 21, 2021; the series is also serialized on the Comic Days and Magazine Pocket services. The first tankōbon volume was released on January 20, 2022. Gravure model Shiro Seyama cosplayed as Tomoko Yoshioka in Weekly Young Magazine to promote the volume's release. Seven volumes have been released as of July 17, 2026. A special full-color volume featuring selected chapters was released on November 20, 2024.

No.	Release date	ISBN
1	January 20, 2022	978-4-06-520467-2
2	September 20, 2022	978-4-06-521342-1
3	June 20, 2023	978-4-06-522292-8
4	February 20, 2024	978-4-06-534680-8
5	November 20, 2024	978-4-06-537475-7
FC	November 20, 2024	978-4-06-538167-0
6	October 20, 2025	978-4-06-540538-3
7	July 17, 2026	978-4-06-543810-7

=== Anime ===
An anime television series adaptation produced under WWWave Corporation's Deregula anime label was announced on May 6, 2026. It will be produced by Quad and directed by Takashi Andō, with series composition handled by Gokō Shiraki, and characters designed by Ryūji Iwata. The series premiered on October 5, 2026, on Tokyo MX and BS11, with the AnimeFesta service exclusively streaming the anime's complete Deregula uncensored version. The opening theme song is "Gingira" (ギンギラ), performed by Airots, and the ending theme song is "False Love", performed by Ceui. OceanVeil is streaming the series.

==== Episodes ====
No.	Episode	Directed by	Written by	Storyboard by	Original release date
1	"Episode 1"	Takashi Ando	Itsutaka Shiraki	Shiro Koroki	October 5, 2026
2	"Episode 2"	Takashi Ando	Itsutaka Shiraki	Shiro Koroki	October 12, 2026
3	"Episode 3"	Sumito Sasaki	Itsutaka Shiraki	Shiro Koroki	October 19, 2026
4	"Episode 4"	Sumito Sasaki	Itsutaka Shiraki	Shiro Koroki	October 26, 2026
5	"Episode 5"	Takashi Ando	Itsutaka Shiraki	Shiro Koroki	November 2, 2026
6	"Episode 6"	Takashi Ando	Itsutaka Shiraki	Shiro Koroki	November 9, 2026

== Reception ==
Following the release of the first volume, it was reported that reception was so positive that a reprint was quickly ordered. It was reported in November 2024 that the series had over 800,000 copies in circulation.
