= Hands Off: Sawaranaide Kotesashi-kun =

Japanese manga series

- First tankōbon volume cover

さわらないで小手指くん (Sawaranaide Kotesashi-kun)
- Genre: Erotic comedy; Romantic comedy; Sports
- Manga
- Written by: Takuya Shinjō
- Published by: Kodansha
- Imprint: Shōnen Magazine Comics
- Magazine: Magazine Pocket
- Original run: May 7, 2021 – present
- Volumes: 17
- Anime television series
- Directed by: Hisashi Saitō
- Written by: Hagane Shirakigo
- Music by: Chihiro Endō
- Studio: Quad
- Licensed by: Crunchyroll (censored); OceanVeil (uncensored); SEA: Plus Media Networks Asia
- Original network: Tokyo MX, BS11 (censored); AT-X (partially uncensored)
- Original run: October 6, 2025 – December 22, 2025
- Episodes: 12
- icon

Hands Off: Sawaranaide Kotesashi-kun (さわらないで小手指くん, Sawaranaide Kotesashi-kun) is a Japanese manga series written and illustrated by Takuya Shinjō. It has been serialized on Kodansha's Magazine Pocket service since May 2021, and has been compiled into seventeen volumes as of September 2026. An anime television series adaptation produced by Quad aired from October to December 2025.

== Plot ==
Kōyō Kotesashi received training as a massage therapist from his parents and aspires to join the medical program of his school. He becomes a caretaker for five female athletes. The Chairman charges him to use his skills to help the athletes reach their full potential in exchange for granting him a scholarship. However, he must dodge the advances of the girls since coupling in the dorms is not allowed. A ongoing theme is that whenever he gives a girl a massage, they feel intense pleasure and usually orgasm.

== Characters ==
Kōyō Kotesashi (小手指向陽, Kotesashi Kōyō)
Voiced by: Rikuya Yasuda
Koyo acts like a professional and immediately starts helping the girls with their issues; pointing out bad habits, like overtraining, and what makes them hurt and do poorly. However, he seems oblivious to the fact that his massages give so much pleasure, and so the girls respect him for never taking advantage of them. Having mentally prepared to treat male and female clients, Koyo grew up with his libido "shut off".
Aroma Kusunoki (楠木アロマ, Kusunoki Aroma)
Voiced by: Hina Suguta
A basketball player who is prudish and initially disdainful of Koyo. She often argues with Aoba.
Aoba Kitahara (北原あおば, Kitahara Aoba)
Voiced by: Yū Serizawa
A soccer player who is flirtatious and desperate to find a boyfriend. She often argues with Aroma.
Izumi Sumiyoshi (住吉いずみ, Sumiyoshi Izumi)
Voiced by: Saya Aizawa
A swimmer and aspiring manga and light novel author.
Chiyo Sayamagaoka (狭山ヶ丘ちよ, Sayamagaoka Chiyo)
Voiced by: Manatsu Murakami
A table tennis player and online gamer.
Miyuki Hongō (本郷みゆき, Hongō Miyuki)
Voiced by: Ruriko Aoki
The captain of the volleyball team. She is unusually fit and strong, with an innate talent for massage herself.

== Media ==
=== Manga ===
Hands Off: Sawaranaide Kotesashi-kun is written and illustrated by Takuya Shinjō. It began serialization on Kodansha's Magazine Pocket service on May 7, 2021. The series has been compiled into seventeen tankōbon volumes as of September 2026.

No.	Release date	ISBN
1	September 9, 2021	978-4-06-524834-8
2	December 9, 2021	978-4-06-526266-5
3	April 8, 2022	978-4-06-527518-4
4	August 9, 2022	978-4-06-528653-1
5	January 6, 2023	978-4-06-530341-2
6	May 9, 2023	978-4-06-531564-4
7	October 6, 2023	978-4-06-533149-1
8	March 8, 2024	978-4-06-534872-7
9	July 9, 2024	978-4-06-536137-5
10	November 8, 2024	978-4-06-537430-6
11	March 7, 2025	978-4-06-538715-3
12	July 9, 2025	978-4-06-539991-0
13	October 9, 2025	978-4-06-541100-1
14	December 9, 2025	978-4-06-541943-4
15	March 9, 2026	978-4-06-542969-3
16	June 9, 2026	978-4-06-543922-7
17	September 9, 2026	978-4-06-544955-4

=== Anime ===
An anime television series adaptation produced under WWWave Corporation's Deregula anime label was announced on March 4, 2025. It is animated by Quad and directed by Hisashi Saitō, with Hagane Shirakigo handling series composition, Ryūsuke Tsukamoto designing the characters, and Chihiro Endō composing the music. The series aired from October 6 to December 22, 2025, on Tokyo MX and BS11, with the AnimeFesta service streaming the full Deregula version with unfiltered and uncensored scenes. (Note: Tokyo MX and BS11 listed the series premiere on October 5 at 25:05, which is effectively October 6 at 1:05 a.m. JST.) The opening theme song is "U.K.U", performed by UtaGe!, while the ending theme song is "Jōjō ↑ High Tension" (上々↑ハイテンション, 'Jōjō ↑ Hai Tenshon'), performed by Palette Parade. Both Crunchyroll and OceanVeil are streaming the series with separate airings (TV broadcast/censored version for Crunchyroll and AnimeFesta's Deregula version for OceanVeil). Plus Media Networks Asia licensed the series in Southeast Asia, Taiwan, Hong Kong and Macau.

==== Episodes ====
No.	Title	Directed by	Storyboarded by	Original release date
1	"Hands Off, Kotesashi-kun"; Transliteration: "Sawaranaide Kotesashi-kun" (Japanese: さわらないで小手指くん)	Ruvu Ōshima	Hisashi Saitō	October 6, 2025
Koyo Kotesashi attends Seiwa High School, which has many famous sports teams. After helping treat a woman who collapsed, Koyo moves into Maplie Lies dormitory as a caretaker. Unfortunately he walks in on a naked girl named Aroma. The mistake is cleared up by another tenant, Miyuki, an elite volleyball player. Aroma is introduced as an elite basketball player who has recently been struggling. Aroma twists her ankle which Koyo quickly examines. Aroma is confused that his touch was enjoyable. Koyo reveals his parents trained him in Seitai therapy so he knows her troubles are caused by misaligned hips. Despite her reservations she allows him to treat her. She is embarrassed to find the experience arousing but effective as her joints improve immediately. She agrees to let him look after her physical health going forward. Koyo meets the other tenants—elite swimmer Izumi, elite table-tennis player Chiyo and elite footballer Aoba. The Chairman, a friend of Koyo's father, reveals the girls live separately as they have difficult personalities. As they have bright futures as famous athletes, he announces if Koyo keeps them healthy he will get a scholarship to Seiwa's medical programme.
2	"What brings you here, Aoba-chan?"; Transliteration: "Nanishini Kitanda Aoba-chan 1" (Japanese: 何しに来たんだ あおばちゃん①)	Mizuki Sakuma	Katsuhiko Nishijima	October 13, 2025
Koyo discovers Aroma and Aoba fight often. While doing laundry Koyo finds a pair of Aroma's panties, which the girls are supposed to wash themselves, making Aroma hate him even more. Immediately afterwards he discovers Chiyo's room is filled with trash, which he trips over, causing him to accidentally grope her breast. Aroma demands he be evicted but oddly Aoba comes to his defense, pointing out the panty incident was clearly Aroma's fault and Chiyo's room is, after all, full of trash to trip over. Aroma unwillingly apologizes. That night Aoba demands as payment for defending him a topless massage. Unsure why it must be topless Koyo nevertheless begins the massage and discovers Aoba is underweight with underdeveloped muscles in her lower body and that she carries most of her stress in her upper back. Aoba barely hears any of this as his massage is so intense she almost faints. Afterwards she is frustrated he did not react to her aggressive flirting and decides to seduce him no matter what.
3	"What brings you here, Aoba-chan? (Part 2)"; Transliteration: "Nanishini Kitanda Aoba-chan 2" (Japanese: 何しに来たんだ あおばちゃん②)	Mizuki Sakuma	Katsuhiko Nishijima	October 20, 2025
As Aoba contemplates seducing Koyo, noting that she has never had a boyfriend and desperately wants one. Meanwhile, Koyo thinks that she was trying to entrap him to get him fired and resolves to ignore her efforts. He serves her herbal tea before giving her another massage, which she insists on doing in nothing but her panties. The tea makes her sweat, so she removes the panties. The massage is so pleasurable that she cries out, making Izumi walk in and think they were having sex. They deny it, but Izumi decides to use this as material for an apparent erotic novel. Koyo then accuses Aoba of trying to get him fired, which she denies, and is pleased to learn that he was attracted to her. Later, Izumi sends him a message telling him to come to her room.
4	"Izumi-chan Wants to Quit Swimming (Part 1)"; Transliteration: "Izumi-chan wa Suiei wo Yametai 1" (Japanese: いずみちゃんは水泳を辞めたい①)	Rei Satō	Yuki Morita	October 27, 2025
Koyo finds Izumi drawing an erotic manga. Assuming he is a seducer she demands to know his secret so she can include it in her manga, become a light novel artist, and quit swimming as she has not won a race since entering high school. Afraid of losing his scholarship, Koyo observes her doing well in swimming practice and determines her problem is lack of confidence. He insists on massaging her before her next tournament to help her relax. She insists she will not be seduced by him but his expertise of pressure points plus lavender massage oil causes intense pleasure. He also offers to stimulate a pressure point to help stop her panicking before the race, but the point is on her chest, making her panic.
5	"Izumi-chan Wants to Quit Swimming (Part 2)"; Transliteration: "Izumi-chan wa Suiei wo Yametai 2" (Japanese: いずみちゃんは水泳を辞めたい②)	Rei Satō	Yuki Morita	November 3, 2025
The vice-principal goes looking for Koyo and Izumi. Izumi remembers she used to love being praised by her mother and coaches, but that praise became disappointment when she stopped winning. Deciding she wants to enjoy swimming again she consents to the chest massage. Koyo begins but Izumi senses he is trying not to touch her breasts, so she gives him permission. Koyo massages her breasts directly to deeply stimulate the pressure point. Izumi resists at first but eventually surrenders to the pleasure. Afterwards she is so relaxed she asks him to do the massage again if she wins the race. The vice-principal accuses Koyo of sex with Izumi. Koyo insists it was a therapeutic massage so she demands he prove his massage skills on her another day or she will have him expelled. Izumi wins her race but doesn't tell her teammates how she got her confidence back. That night, she has a sexual fantasy of Koyo and considers asking him for another massage.
6	"Chiyo-chan Can't Take the ****? (Part 1)"; Transliteration: "Chiyo-chan wa ×× ga Nigate? 1" (Japanese: ちよちゃんは××が苦手？①)	Takashi Andō	Takashi Andō	November 10, 2025
Koyo and Aoba cook a feast to celebrate Izumi's victory, but Izumi stops him from saying he massaged her. Aroma and Izumi become jealous when Aoba flirts with him. Chiyo is sleepy and is scolded for always staying up all night playing online games. Chiyo pulls another online gaming session and is obsessed with beating another player. Koyo enters and offers to massage her to relax her enough to win so she can sleep. He cleans up her room first and she asks him which of the girls he likes, which shocks him. The massage is pleasurable at first, but when he touches her armpits, she reacts in pain. He says based on her musculature and the fact she only drinks water or tea instead of soda, she takes her training seriously. He asks her to endure the massage so that she can reach her full potential.
7	"Chiyo-chan Can't Take the ****? (Part 2)"; Transliteration: "Chiyo-chan wa ×× ga Nigate? 2" (Japanese: ちよちゃんは××が苦手？②)	Takashi Andō	Shirou Kuroki	November 17, 2025
Koyo performs the massage and Chiyo is in so much pain that she feels like she is being tortured, but she endures it. When it is over, she is surprised to find that she feels better. Instead of continuing her gaming session, she goes to sleep and realizes she has a crush on Koyo. The next day is the first day of school. Koyo, Aroma, and Aoba have the same class and he is forced to hear them bicker. A girl suddenly pulls him aside. She is Moeko Hayami, a member of Miyuki’s volleyball team. Having heard of his talent with massages, she explains her team is going on a bus trip to a training camp and asks him to meet them before the bus arrives.
8	"Miyuki-chan Is Charismatic (Part 1)"; Transliteration: "Miyuki-chan wa Charisma ①" (Japanese: みゆきちゃんはカリスマ①)	Mizuki Sakuma	Katsuhiko Nishijima	November 24, 2025
Moeko explains Miyuki is a world class athlete and while trying to keep up with her in training the rest of the girls are exhausting themselves, putting the volleyball championship at risk, so she wants Koyo to help all 30 girls. On his first day Koyo treats sixteen girls' ailments, which all find intensely pleasurable. Exhausted, Koyo visits the camp hot spring during the men's time slot but finds a naked Miyuki who accidentally stayed late. Miyuki apologizes for making him work even more as she never noticed she was pushing the girls too hard. Koyo points out there is nothing wrong with the training, it is the lack of aftercare, since Miyuki's body is built differently than theirs and can handle the additional stress. Feeling better, Miyuki offers to massage Koyo since he is exhausted from doing sixteen massages. Blindfolded to avoid seeing her naked, Koyo shows her what to do and is amazed at how quickly she learns proper massage technique.
9	"Miyuki-chan Is Charismatic (Part 2)"; Transliteration: "Miyuki-chan wa Charisma ②" (Japanese: みゆきちゃんはカリスマ②)	Mizuki Sakuma	Katsuhiko Nishijima	December 1, 2025
Koyo is impressed Miyuki can stretch his joints perfectly, making him feel incredible pleasure. Next, they try massage and Koyo can tell she has an instinct for locating pressure points. He shows her general massage techniques for volleyball players to promote strength and flexibility in their neck, shoulders and lower back and improve blood flow. Miyuki copies the techniques on him but keeps being distracted by his surprisingly muscular body. Koyo is amazed by her natural talent, and decides to massage her to the limit of his ability. However, he is unable to find any fatigue on her body despite her intense training. Miyuki admits she has always stretched her own body after training, leading Koyo to conclude she instinctively knows her own body so well she has been treating her own fatigue without realising. Miyuki is disappointed he won’t need to massage her but cheers up when he promises to help with anything she needs. Koyo treats the rest of the girls and they return on the bus. Aoba suddenly calls in a panic, explaining Aroma has seriously injured her leg.
10	"Aroma-chan Needs to Rest (Part 1)"; Transliteration: "Aroma-chan wa Zettai Ansei ①" (Japanese: アロマちゃんは絶対安静①)	Ruvu Ōshima	Yuki Morita	December 8, 2025
Aroma has a sprained ankle requiring two weeks of rest. Aroma is relieved as she should be able to take part in her tournament in four weeks. Miyuki asks Koyo to watch Aroma to ensure she doesn’t injure the ankle further. Koyo is surprised Aroma actually asks for a massage. He soon realises she has been taking care of herself and is in top condition. As she doesn’t require treatment he decides to make it a relaxing massage. Aroma secretly hopes the massage will be as pleasant as last time and is proven right as she cries out in pleasure. After cleaning up Koyo finds Aroma has gone missing and suspects she snuck out to train. He rushes to school but she isn’t there, so he learns from her teammate Aroma sometimes trains at the court under the bridge. Koyo blames himself for only looking after Aroma’s physical health and not her emotional state, which must have been affected by injuring herself right after being given one of the most important positions on her team. He finds her under the bridge.
11	"Aroma-chan Needs to Rest (Part 2)"; Transliteration: "Aroma-chan wa Zettai Ansei ②" (Japanese: アロマちゃんは絶対安静②)	Ruvu Ōshima	Yuki Morita	December 15, 2025
Aroma says she only wanted some fresh air, then confides how disappointed she is in letting her team down. With her permission, Koyo feels her butt and deduces her glutes are underdeveloped. He points out that she can exercise her glutes without putting pressure on her ankle, and that strengthening that part will improve her performance. She exercises her glutes until her ankle heals. Koyo, Aroma, and Aoba walk to school and meet three members of the volleyball team who tease Koyo for being a playboy after mistaking Aroma and Aoba for his girlfriends, then one asks for a massage later and he agrees. After they leave, Aroma and Aoba become jealous. The vice-principal suddenly confronts them.
12	"Kotesashi-kun's Breast-Enhancement Massage Lesson"; Transliteration: "Kotesashi-kun Iku Chichi Massāji Kōza" (Japanese: 小手指くん育乳マッサージ講座)	Fumio Itō	Yuki Morita	December 22, 2025
The vice-principal orders Koyo to meet her after class. Once he does, she removes her top and bra and orders him to massage her shoulders, planning to expel him once he gropes her breasts. She nearly cries out in pleasure but is surprised when he does not grope her. He recognizes her as the woman he treated in the first episode and suggests she correct her sitting posture to ease her shoulder pain. As she leaves, she is still determined to expose him as a pervert and arranges a field trip to Okinawa for the athletes and Koyo. The five girls are excited about the trip but become jealous of Miyuki's large chest. Koyo offers to blindfold himself and teach them all a massage that can increase their bust size. While teaching them, he reveals he turned off the switch for his libido long ago. He explains the massage will take about six months to work, but the girls think they can seduce him with larger breasts. At the field trip, on the beach, Koyo is shocked seeing so many girls in swimsuits.
