= Quad (studio) =

Japanese animation studio

JFK; Quad
- Native name: 株式会社JFK
- Romanized name: Kabushiki-gaisha JFK
- Type: Kabushiki-gaisha
- Industry: Japanese animation
- Founded: May 1, 2018; 8 years ago
- Headquarters: Nakamura, Nerima, Tokyo, Japan
- Key people: Naoto Tanno (founder & CEO)
- Website: j-f-k.jp

Quad, officially JFK (Japanese: 株式会社JFK, Hepburn: Kabushiki-gaisha JFK), is a Japanese animation studio based in Nerima, Tokyo founded in 2018.

== Establishment ==
The studio was founded on May 1, 2018, by former members of AIC and Production IMS led by Naoto Tanno. In 2023, the studio relocated from Suginami to Nerima.

== Works ==
=== Television series ===
| Title | Director(s) | First run start date | First run end date | Eps | Note(s) | Ref(s) |
|---|---|---|---|---|---|---|
| Miss Kuroitsu from the Monster Development Department | Hisashi Saitō | January 9, 2022 | April 3, 2022 | 12 | Based on a manga by Hiroaki Mizusaki. | |
| My Life as Inukai-san's Dog | Takashi Andō | January 7, 2023 | March 25, 2023 | 12 | Based on a manga by Itsutsuse. | |
| Protocol: Rain | Daishi Kato; Yasutaka Yamamoto | October 8, 2023 | December 24, 2023 | 12 | Original work by Team Kitsune and Kotsukotsu. | |
| I'm Living with an Otaku NEET Kunoichi!? | Hisashi Saitō | January 5, 2025 | June 22, 2025 | 24 | Based on a manga by Kotatsu and Yakitomato. | |
| I'm the Evil Lord of an Intergalactic Empire! | Tetsuya Yanagisawa | April 6, 2025 | June 22, 2025 | 12 | Based on a light novel by Yomu Mishima. | |
| Hands Off: Sawaranaide Kotesashi-kun | Hisashi Saitō | October 6, 2025 | December 22, 2025 | 12 | Based on a manga by Takuya Shinjō. | |
| My Girlfriend's Friend | Takashi Andō | October 5, 2026 | TBA | TBA | Based on a manga by Jura. | |
