= I'm the Evil Lord of an Intergalactic Empire! =

Japanese light novel series

- First light novel volume cover

俺は星間国家の悪徳領主！ (Ore wa Seikan Kokka no Akutoku Ryōshu!)
- Genre: Harem; Isekai; Science fiction comedy
- Novel series
- Written by: Yomu Mishima
- Published by: Shōsetsuka ni Narō
- Original run: August 15, 2018 – present
- Light novel
- Written by: Yomu Mishima
- Illustrated by: Nadare Takamine
- Published by: Overlap
- English publisher: NA: Seven Seas Entertainment
- Imprint: Overlap Bunko
- Original run: July 25, 2020 – present
- Volumes: 12
- Manga
- Written by: Yomu Mishima
- Illustrated by: Kai Nadashima
- Published by: Overlap
- English publisher: NA: Seven Seas Entertainment
- Magazine: Comic Gardo
- Original run: May 29, 2021 – present
- Volumes: 11
- Novel series

I'm the Heroic Knight of an Intergalactic Empire!
- Written by: Yomu Mishima
- Published by: Shōsetsuka ni Narō
- Original run: November 16, 2021 – present
- Light novel

I'm the Heroic Knight of an Intergalactic Empire!
- Written by: Yomu Mishima
- Illustrated by: Nadare Takamine
- Published by: Overlap
- English publisher: NA: Seven Seas Entertainment
- Imprint: Overlap Bunko
- Original run: December 25, 2022 – present
- Volumes: 5
- Manga

I'm the Heroic Knight of an Intergalactic Empire!
- Written by: Yomu Mishima
- Illustrated by: Jū Ishiguchi
- Published by: Overlap
- English publisher: NA: Seven Seas Entertainment
- Magazine: Comic Gardo
- Original run: July 21, 2023 – present
- Volumes: 4
- Anime television series
- Directed by: Tetsuya Yanagisawa
- Written by: Katsuhiko Takayama
- Music by: Yūsuke Seo; Shun Narita
- Studio: Quad
- Licensed by: Crunchyroll; SEA: Muse Communication
- Original network: ANN (ABC TV, TV Asahi), AT-X
- Original run: April 6, 2025 – June 22, 2025
- Episodes: 12
- icon

I'm the Evil Lord of an Intergalactic Empire! (俺は星間国家の悪徳領主！, Ore wa Seikan Kokka no Akutoku Ryōshu!; lit. 'I'm the Interstellar Empire's Villainous Lord') is a Japanese light novel series written by Yomu Mishima and illustrated by Nadare Takamine. It began serialization as a web novel published on the user-generated novel publishing website Shōsetsuka ni Narō in August 2018. It was later acquired by Overlap who began publishing it under their Overlap Bunko light novel imprint in July 2020. A manga adaptation illustrated by Kai Nadashima began serialization on Overlap's Comic Gardo manga website in May 2021. An anime television series adaptation produced by Quad aired from April to June 2025.

== Premise ==
A man has a horrible life due to his righteous and kind nature. He is also unfairly fired and blamed for things he did not do. A being known as the Guide offers to reincarnate him in a new world, so he may live as selfishly as he wishes. After the deal is made, the Guide is revealed to be evil, having amped up and manipulated everyone around him to make the man's life a living hell; even ruining his cheating wife's life as a coup de grace.

The Guide's plans begin to fail, as the newly reborn Liam Banfield is living a successful life as the Lord of his planet. His definition of evil conflicts with the new world and all his attempts to build his power to become a tyrant keep backfiring.

== Characters ==
Liam Sera Banfield (リアム・セラ・バンフィールド, Riamu Sera Banfīrudo)
Voiced by: Natsuki Hanae, Kaori Maeda (young), Toshiya Miyata (previous life)
Having lived a miserable life being virtuous, Liam decides to be evil in this next life. However, a combination of his long-term plans to strengthen and develop his fiefdom, comparison against the often corrupt and indolent nobility of the Empire, and comedic happenstance, he ends up looking like a benevolent and just ruler. Even his desire for gold looks odd as it has relatively low monetary value in the new world compared to metals like mithril and adamantium.
Amagi (天城)
Voiced by: Reina Ueda
An AI maid robot gifted to Liam on his fifth birthday by his mother, before she and her husband abandoned the Banfield domain for the Imperial Capital Planet.
Nias Carlin (ニアス・カーリン, Niasu Kārin)
Voiced by: Ayana Taketatsu
An engineer from the Seventh Imperial Weapons Factory.
Christiana Leta Rosebreyer (クリスティアナ・レタ・ローズブレイア, Kurisutiana Reta Rōzubureia)
Voiced by: Mikako Komatsu
Former "Princess Knight" of the Holy Kingdom of Rosebreyer, captured by Goaz's pirate gang and subjected to inhumane torture after the destruction of her home. She and other victims are rescued by Liam after defeating Goaz's fleet.
The Guide (案内人, Annainin)
Voiced by: Takehito Koyasu
A malevolent emotion eater, who feeds on misery, despair, and other negative emotions. He made Liam's life hell by helping his cheating wife frame him for tons of things. Because Liam keeps on succeeding in the new world despite the Guide's best efforts to bring misery, Liam continues to hold the misunderstanding that the Guide is his benevolent guardian, with his feelings of gratitude hurting and starving the Guide. In truth, Leon's dog's spirit is meddling with everything. Having originally gone to welcome Leon to the afterlife, the dog followed him to the new world to ensure his master's happiness.
Yasushi (安士)
Voiced by: Shin'ichirō Miki
A master swordsman hired to teach Liam while claiming expertise in the Way of the Flash style. He is later revealed to be a fraud who taught nonsensical techniques, intending only to collect a payment. After Liam miraculously develops incredible swordsmanship skills from the erroneous instruction, the master flees, fearing execution for his deception.
Brian Beaumont (ブライアン・ボーモント, Buraian Bōmonto)
Voiced by: Yōji Ueda
A butler in service to House Banfield since the days of Liam's great-grandfather.
Goaz (ゴアズ, Goazu)
Voiced by: Tetsu Inada
Leader of the pirate fleet.
Liam's ex-wife
A redhead who cheated on him and birthed her lover's daughter. To make matters worse, she used him to pay for everything and accumulated debt that she pushed on him; even getting him fired for embezzlement that someone else did. After the Guide decides to give her horrible luck, she spends the rest of her life in regret; the husband who was always there for her dead, she had nothing to live for.

== Media ==
=== Light novel ===
Written by Yomu Mishima, I'm the Evil Lord of an Intergalactic Empire! began serialization on the user-generated novel publishing site Shōsetsuka ni Narō on August 15, 2018. It was later acquired by Overlap who began publishing it with illustrations by Nadare Takamine under their Overlap Bunko light novel imprint on July 25, 2020. Twelve volumes have been released as of July 2026. The light novel is licensed in North America by Seven Seas Entertainment.

No.	Original release date	Original ISBN	English release date	English ISBN
1	July 25, 2020	978-4-86554-694-1	September 9, 2021 (digital); November 2, 2021 (print)	978-1-64827-657-6
Prologue; Chapter 1: "Liam"; Chapter 2: "Sword Master"; Chapter 3: "The Way of the Flash"; Chapter 4: "Liam at Thirty"; Chapter 5: "The Avid"; Chapter 6: "Honey Trap"; Chapter 7: "Evil Merchant"; Chapter 8: "Space Pirates"; Chapter 9: "First Battle"; Chapter 10: "Successor—Originator of the Way of the Flash"; Chapter 11: "Treasure"; Chapter 12: "The Princess Knight"; Chapter 13: "Family"; Chapter 14: "Gratitude"; Epilogue; Bonus: "Liam's Harem Plan"
2	December 25, 2020	978-4-86554-801-3	February 3, 2022 (digital); March 15, 2022 (print)	978-1-63858-146-8
Prologue; Chapter 1: "Viscount Razel"; Chapter 2: "Training Begins"; Chapter 3: "Evil Lord Buddies"; Chapter 4: "Suspicious Person"; Chapter 5: "Unwelcome Reunion"; Chapter 6: "Business"; Chapter 7: "Full Mastery"; Chapter 8: "Too Late"; Chapter 9: "Black and White"; Chapter 10: "The One That Got Away"; Chapter 11: "A Gift from the Past"; Chapter 12: "A Pure and Just Evil Lord"; Epilogue; Bonus: "Mass-Produced Maids"
3	April 25, 2021	978-4-86554-888-4	October 13, 2022 (digital); November 15, 2022 (print)	978-1-63858-629-6
Prologue; Chapter 1: "Fun, Fun Primary School"; Chapter 2: "Duchess-to-Be"; Chapter 3: "Mad Dog Marie"; Chapter 4: "Assassins"; Chapter 5: "Steel Claudia"; Chapter 6: "The Mobile Knight Tournament"; Chapter 7: "The Pirate Hunter and the Pirate Knights"; Chapter 8: "The Engagement Ceremony"; Epilogue; Bonus: "The Maids of the Mansion"
4	October 25, 2021	978-4-8240-0020-0	February 16, 2023 (digital); April 25, 2023 (print)	978-1-63858-879-5
Prologue; Chapter 1: "Military Academy"; Chapter 2: "House Berkeley Makes Its Move"; Chapter 3: "Patrol Fleet"; Chapter 4: "Rosetta's Training"; Interlude: "You Can Do It, Claus"; Chapter 5: "Practical Training"; Chapter 6: "Empire Merchants"; Chapter 7: "The Berkeley Fleet"; Chapter 8: "Miscalculation"; Chapter 9: "Nightmare"; Chapter 10: "The Truth"; Epilogue; Bonus: "Rosetta and the Maid Robots"
5	April 25, 2022	978-4-8240-0159-7	June 29, 2023 (digital); August 15, 2023 (print)	978-1-68579-654-9
Prologue; Chapter 1: "Who Is the True Enemy?"; Chapter 2: "Economic Sanctions"; Chapter 3: "True Villains"; Chapter 4: "Other Intergalactic Nations"; Chapter 5: "Liam Fools Around"; Chapter 6: "The Darkness of the Empire"; Chapter 7: "Swordmaster"; Chapter 8: "Responsibility"; Chapter 9: "Three Swords"; Epilogue; Bonus: "Mass-Produced Maid Tateyama"
6	December 25, 2022	978-4-8240-0359-1	October 12, 2023 (digital); January 23, 2024 (print)	979-8-88843-124-5
Prologue; Chapter 1: "Treachery"; Chapter 2: "The Guide's Perfect Plan"; Interlude: "Inspector Elia"; Chapter 3: "Trouble"; Chapter 4: "Conceit"; Chapter 5: "Wallace's Awakening"; Chapter 6: "The Expeditionary Army"; Chapter 7: "House Banfield's Protest Problem"; Chapter 8: "Their Names"; Chapter 9: "The Formula for Victory"; Chapter 10: "Assassination"; Chapter 11: "Ship Severer"; Chapter 12: "Court of Inquiry"; Chapter 13: "The Rules of the Way of the Flash"; Chapter 14: "A Flash of Gratitude"; Epilogue; Bonus: "Arashima's Counterattack"
7	May 25, 2023	978-4-8240-0499-4	July 18, 2024 (digital); August 20, 2024 (print)	979-8-89160-117-8
Prologue; Chapter 1: "The World Tree"; Chapter 2: "The Guide's Scheme"; Chapter 3: "Hero Summoning"; Chapter 4: "The Demon Lord's Army"; Chapter 5: "House Banfield in Chaos"; Chapter 6: "The Royal Guards"; Chapter 7: "Miscalculation"; Chapter 8: "The Biggest Villain"; Chapter 9: "A Family Squabble"; Chapter 10: "The Demon Lord"; Chapter 11: "The Demon Lord's Demise"; Chapter 12: "A Pet Dog"; Chapter 13: "Fury"; Chapter 14: "A Decent Evil Lord"; Chapter 15: "The Weight of a Life"; Chapter 16: "Touchstone"; Epilogue; Bonus: "Mass-Produced Maid Tamaki"; Bonus: "Mr. Claus of House Banfield"
8	January 25, 2024	978-4-8240-0682-0	February 20, 2025 (digital); March 18, 2025 (print)	979-8-89160-870-2
Prologue; Chapter 1: "Reporting for Duty"; Chapter 2: "House Balandin"; Chapter 3: "The Workplace"; Chapter 4: "Lady Annabelle"; Chapter 5: "Calvin and Isel"; Chapter 6: "Randy"; Chapter 7: "Ambition"; Chapter 8: "Lillie"; Chapter 9: "Betrayal"; Chapter 10: "Miss Ethel of the Royal Guard"; Chapter 11: "A Black Nemain"; Chapter 12: "An Evil Magistrate"; Chapter 13: "Planet Augur"; Chapter 14: "The G'doire Autocracy"; Chapter 15: "The Right Hand"; Chapter 16: "Liam the Evil Magistrate"; Chapter 17: "Liam and Isel"; Chapter 18: "Spectators"; Chapter 19: "The True Victor"; Chapter 20: "Princess of the Autocracy"; Chapter 21: "The Guide and G'doire"; Epilogue; Bonus: "Azuma"
9	October 25, 2024	978-4-8240-0969-2	July 17, 2025 (digital); August 19, 2025 (print)	979-8-89561-207-1
Prologue; Chapter 1: "A Flash of Insight"; Chapter 2: "Before Setting Out"; Chapter 3: "Playing the Part"; Chapter 4: "A Grave Miscalculation"; Chapter 5: "Rosetta's Security Force"; Chapter 6: "The Evil Magistrate"; Chapter 7: "Followers of the Way of the Flash"; Chapter 8: "A Journey to Right Wrongs"; Chapter 9: "Yasushi in Chains"; Chapter 10: "The Magistrate's Mansion"; Chapter 11: "The Original Way of the Flash"; Chapter 12: "Liam's Awakening"; Chapter 13: "Swordsman of the Way of the Flash"; Chapter 14: "Enemies of the Way of the Flash"; Chapter 15: "A Losing Battle"; Chapter 16: "The Purpose of the Way of the Flash"; Chapter 17: "Yasushi the Traitor"; Chapter 18: "A Curse or Blessing"
10	March 25, 2025	978-4-8240-1113-8	December 11, 2025 (digital); January 20, 2026 (print)	979-8-89561-684-0
Prologue; Chapter 1: "An Unjustified Grudge"; Chapter 2: "A Proxy War"; Chapter 3: "Planet Chariot"; Chapter 4: "Baron Glynn"; Chapter 5: "Child Rearing"; Chapter 6: "A Last Stand"; Chapter 7: "Daily Life at House Banfield"; Chapter 8: "Victory Conditions"; Chapter 9: "Fishing"; Chapter 10: "Lily and Gerbera"; Chapter 11: "Imitation"; Chapter 12: "Wedding Gifts"; Chapter 13: "The Emperor"; Chapter 14: "A Clean Slate"; Chapter 15: "A Present from an Evil Lord"; Chapter 16: "The Birth of Duke Banfield"; Chapter 17: "People After"; Bonus: "Mass-Produced Maid Ibuki"
11	July 25, 2025	978-4-8240-1254-8	May 14, 2026 (digital); June 23, 2026 (print)	979-8-89765-396-6
Prologue; Chapter 1: "An Evil Lord's Work?"; Chapter 2: "The Devil of the Underground"; Chapter 3: "A Brother-in-Law"; Chapter 4: "House Exner"; Chapter 5: "A Villain's Ethos"; Chapter 6: "House Banfield's Bonds"; Chapter 7: "Call Me "Sister""; Chapter 8: "Rescue Mission"; Chapter 9: "Blitzkrieg"; Chapter 10: "The Hounds"; Chapter 11: "Ground Battle"; Chapter 12: "Repairs"; Chapter 13: "Truth and Reality"; Chapter 14: "The Avid and the Vanadis"; Chapter 15: "Inherited Ties"; Chapter 16: "Gemini Flowers"; Chapter 17: "Kurt and Cecilia"; Bonus: "Witnessed by a Mass-Produced Maid! The Sword Devil's True Identity"
12	July 20, 2026	978-4-8240-1733-8	May 18, 2027 (print)	979-8-89863-954-9

Its spin-off I'm the Hero Knight of an Intergalactic Empire! (あたしは星間国家の英雄騎士！, Atashi wa Seikan Kokka no Eiyū Kishi!) began serialization on Shōsetsuka ni Narō on November 16, 2021. It also was later acquired by Overlap who began publishing it with illustrations also by Nadare Takamine under Overlap Bunko on December 25, 2022. Five volumes have been released as of January 2026. The spin-off is also licensed in North America by Seven Seas Entertainment.

No.	Original release date	Original ISBN	English release date	English ISBN
1	December 25, 2022	978-4-8240-0358-4	August 1, 2024 (digital); August 27, 2024 (print)	979-8-89160-404-9
Prologue; Chapter 1: "A Defective D-Ranker"; Chapter 2: "The Border Region Security Force"; Chapter 3: "The Masterpiece Moheive"; Chapter 4: "The Third Platoon"; Chapter 5: "The Space Pirates"; Chapter 6: "An Emergency Deployment"; Chapter 7: "The Jager Squad"; Chapter 8: "Banfield Demons"; Chapter 9: "Sacrificial Pawns"; Chapter 10: "The Atalanta"; Chapter 11: "A Prodigy"; Chapter 12: "The Man She Most Admired"; Epilogue; Bonus: "The Award Ceremony"; Bonus: "Claudia Beltran's Façade"
2	September 25, 2023	978-4-8240-0604-2	December 5, 2024 (digital); January 7, 2025 (print)	979-8-89160-522-0
Prologue; Chapter 1: "Asteroid Neia"; Chapter 2: "Mercenaries"; Chapter 3: "The Mad Genias"; Chapter 4: "Self-Destruction"; Chapter 5: "On the Chopping Block"; Chapter 6: "Private First Class Molly Burrell"; Chapter 7: "Joint Development"; Chapter 8: "The Battle on the Asteroid"; Chapter 9: "The Gold Raccoon"; Chapter 10: "Overload"; Chapter 11: "What Knighthood Means"; Chapter 12: "Disbandment"; Epilogue; Bonus: "A Private Room"
3	June 25, 2024	978-4-8240-0849-7	June 5, 2025 (digital); July 15, 2025 (print)	979-8-89373-331-0
Prologue; Chapter 1: "A New Job"; Chapter 2: "A Rotten Lot"; Chapter 3: "The Elite Squad"; Chapter 4: "Promising Youths"; Chapter 5: "Rodman Does Have My Sympathies"; Chapter 6: "A Style"; Chapter 7: "Petrified and Blessed"; Chapter 8: "Selfish"; Chapter 9: "A Nuisance"; Chapter 10: "The Rebel Army"; Chapter 11: "A Knight's Right"; Chapter 12: "Enhanced Soldiers"; Chapter 13: "A Comeback"; Chapter 14: "The Chimera"; Chapter 15: "Marie Marian"; Epilogue
4	March 25, 2025	978-4-8240-1112-1	December 25, 2025 (digital); January 27, 2026 (print)	979-8-89561-685-7
Prologue; Chapter 1: "A Bunch of Eccentrics"; Chapter 2: "War"; Chapter 3: "Alison Baker"; Chapter 4: "The Dahlia Mercenaries' Enhanced Soldier"; Chapter 5: "The Strike Squad"; Chapter 6: "The Imperial Army"; Chapter 7: "To Capture a Fortress"; Chapter 8: "The Lightning-Bolt Knight"; Chapter 9: "The Power of the Experimental Engineering Ship"; Chapter 10: "Those Known as Mercenaries"; Chapter 11: "Pillaging"; Chapter 12: "Paragon"; Chapter 13: "Humiliation"; Chapter 14: "The Aftermath"; Chapter 15: "The Princess Knight"; Bonus: "Alison's Bragging"; Bonus: "Emma Rodman Rises Through the Ranks"
5	January 25, 2026	978-4-8240-1484-9	September 17, 2026 (digital); October 6, 2026 (print)	979-8-89765-397-3
Prologue; Chapter 1: "Back to the Knight Academy"; Chapter 2: "Hydra Days"; Chapter 3: "Mayhem in House Banfield"; Chapter 4: "She of the Ringlets"; Chapter 5: "Hunters Once More"; Chapter 6: "Desperate Time"; Chapter 7: "Space Battle"; Chapter 8: "A Noble's Worth"; Chapter 9: "Grudge Match"; Chapter 10: "A Trusty Steed"; Chapter 11: "Rivals"; Side story: "A Friend in the Royal Guard"; Chapter 12: "A Reward"; Bonus: "Different Pays Off"

=== Manga ===
A manga adaptation illustrated by Kai Nadashima began serialization on Overlap's Comic Gardo manga website on May 29, 2021. The adaptation's chapters have been collected into eleven volumes as of November 2026. The manga adaptation is also licensed in North America by Seven Seas Entertainment.

No.	Original release date	Original ISBN	English release date	English ISBN
1	October 25, 2021	978-4-8240-0030-9	December 13, 2022	978-1-68579-341-8
1. "The Guide"; 2. "Amagi"; 3. "The Man Called Yasushi"; 4. "Way of the Sword"; 5. "Avid"; Bonus; Bonus Short Story: "Education Capsule"
2	April 25, 2022	978-4-8240-0170-2	May 2, 2023	978-1-68579-491-0
6. "Honey Pot?"; 7. "Space Pirates"; 8. "Declaration of War"; 9. "First Battle"; 10. "Treasure Hunting"; Bonus; Bonus Short Story: "The Elegant Days of an Evil Lord"
3	October 25, 2022	978-4-8240-0317-1	November 21, 2023	979-8-88843-057-6
11. "Suppression"; 12. "Doll"; 13. "Princess Knight"; 14. "Training Destination"; 15. "House of Viscount Razel"; Bonus; Bonus Short Story: "Ancient Civilization"
4	April 25, 2023	978-4-8240-0478-9	May 28, 2024	979-8-88843-743-8
16. "Between Villains"; 17. "Good to See You"; 18. "Domain Administration"; 19. "Fidelity"; 20. "Stray Dog"; Bonus
5	October 25, 2023	978-4-8240-0640-0	November 26, 2024	979-8-89160-512-1
21. "No-Name Sword Style"; 22. "Superdreadnought Warship"; 23. "Personal Knight"; 24. "Test Fire Time"; 25. "Tax Hikes!!"; Bonus
6	April 25, 2024	978-4-8240-0811-4	May 27, 2025	979-8-89373-149-1
26. "Thank You"; 27. "Pathetic Guy"; 28. "Loathing"; 29. "Someone, Save Me!!"; 30. "Way to Boost Peerage"; Bonus
7	October 25, 2024	978-4-8240-0990-6	December 2, 2025	979-8-89561-208-8
31. "Duty"; 32. "My Only Resistance"; 33. "The Sweetest Plea for Death I Could Ask For"; 34. "That Sounds Great"; 35. "Survival of the Fittest"; Bonus
8	April 25, 2025	978-4-8240-1169-5	May 5, 2026	979-8-89765-212-9
36. "Now, Show Me"; 37. "Wonderful Spite"; 38. "Get Cocky!!"; 39. "Conceit"; 40. "Tell Me More"; Bonus
9	October 25, 2025	978-4-8240-1390-3	November 3, 2026	979-8-89863-194-9
41. "Supreme and Ultimate"; 42. "My Life Is Over"; 43. "Contract"; 44. "Adjutant"; 45. "So Damn Bored"; Bonus
10	April 20, 2026	978-4-8240-1615-7	April 27, 2027	979-8-89863-955-6
11	November 20, 2026	978-4-8240-1947-9	—	—

For its spin-off I'm the Heroic Knight of an Intergalactic Empire!, a manga adaptation illustrated Jū Ishiguchi also began serialization on Comic Gardo on July 21, 2023. The first tankōbon volume was published on December 25, 2023. The spin-off manga is also licensed in North America by Seven Seas Entertainment.

No.	Original release date	Original ISBN	English release date	English ISBN
1	December 25, 2023	978-4-8240-0691-2	October 7, 2025	979-8-89561-209-5
1. "My Knight Idol"; 2. "Worthless D Rank"; 3. "Vow"; 4. "A Border Region's Mock Battle"; 5. "A Defect Unit's Fierce Battle"; Bonus: "Welcome to Knight Academy"
2	June 25, 2024	978-4-8240-0864-0	February 3, 2026	979-8-89561-209-5
6. "The Battle Begins"; 7. "Dignity"; 8. "Atalanta"; 9. "Peculiar Talent"; 10. "My Idol"; Bonus: "Atalanta's New Loadout"
3	April 25, 2025	978-4-8240-1168-8	June 16, 2026	979-8-89765-213-6
11. "New Mission"; 12. "Ideal and Reality"; 13. "Assault"; 14. "Bloody Devil"; 15. "Gold Raccoon"; Bonus: "Emma & Toy Models"
4	July 25, 2025	978-4-8240-1269-2	November 3, 2026	979-8-89765-919-7
16. "Conclusion"; 17. "A New Mission"; 18. "My Own Style"; 19. "An Arrogant Knight"; 20. "Knight's Prerogative"; 21. "Enhanced Soldier"; 22. "Onward to the Next Battlefield"

=== Anime ===
An anime television series adaptation was announced during the "5th Overlap Bunko All-Star Roundup Special" livestream on October 20, 2024. It is produced by Quad and directed by Tetsuya Yanagisawa, with scripts written by Katsuhiko Takayama, characters designed by Kazuya Morimae, and music composed by Yūsuke Seo and Shun Narita. The series aired from April 6 to June 22, 2025, on the Animazing!!! programming block on all ANN affiliates, including ABC Television and TV Asahi. (Note: ABC Television and TV Asahi listed the series premiere on April 5, 2025, at 26:00, which is effectively April 6 at 2:00 a.m. JST.) The opening theme song is "Uchū-teki Mystery" (宇宙的MYSTERY; Space-Like Mystery), performed by Saishū Mirai Shōjo, while the ending theme song is "Nantonaku" (なんとなく; Somehow), performed by Nagi Fujisaki. Crunchyroll streamed the series. Muse Communication licensed the series in Southeast Asia.

==== Episodes ====
No.	Title	Directed by (Note: Production staff information is taken from the ending credits of each episode.)	Written by	Storyboarded by	Original release date
1	"Revenge"; Transliteration: "Fukushū" (Japanese: 復讐)	Mizuki Iwata	Katsuhiko Takayama	Tetsuya Yanagisawa	April 6, 2025 (Note: Episodes 1 and 2 were previewed on Abema on March 25, 2025.)
As Liam Sera Banfield leads his fleet into battle, he recalls the collapse of his past life as a salaryman putting in long hours at an abusive workplace for his wife Mika and daughter Kanami. He discovers Mika has cheated on him with a man that Kanami loves more, then loses his job after being falsely accused of embezzlement. Mika divorces him and takes full custody of Kanami, and he is forced to work as a laborer just to pay child support. As he lays dying alone of an illness he cannot afford to treat, an entity calling himself the Guide appears and reveals that Mika had Kanami with his own boss, who also framed him for embezzlement. The Guide offers the dying man a choice of worlds to reincarnate in, and he chooses a sci-fi fantasy universe, vowing to live an evil and self-absorbed life.
2	"Rebirth"; Transliteration: "Tensei" (Japanese: 転生)	Sumito Sasaki	Takayama Katsuhiko	Katsuhiko Nishijima	April 13, 2025
Liam awakens on his family's planet Hydra on his fifth birthday, where his parents gift him a customized android "doll" before bequeathing their entire domain to him so they can retire to a comfortable life on the Imperial Capital planet. Back on Earth, the Guide reveals that he had manipulated Liam's former boss and Mika to fatally exacerbate his misery before having the latter arrested as they have dinner in a fancy restaurant, devastating Mika. The Guide excitedly expects to feed off of Liam's misery in his new life as people in the new universe live significantly longer. As he steps into a portal to the new universe, a glowing puppy appears by Liam's side before following the Guide through. The doll arrives at Liam's mansion, and he names her Amagi. While he tries to physically enjoy her company, his butler Brian informs him that people in this galaxy live much longer lives, and that possessing artificial intelligence is frowned upon due to a previous AI revolt nearly destroying human civilization. He then informs Liam that his parents have squandered the prosperity built by his great-grandfather Alistair and abandoned their responsibility by making him the head of the family. Liam realizes he is now in a similar situation as his past life, but this time he has control and others he can trust to help him. He implants his own interpretation of the Three Laws of Robotics into Amagi's memory to ensure her trust and requests her to start bringing the domain's finances to order while he enters a special stasis capsule to accelerate his formal education. Elsewhere, Princess Christiana Rosebreia begins battle with a fleet of space pirates.
3	"Way of the Flash"; Transliteration: "Issenryū" (Japanese: 一閃流)	Mizuki Sakuma	Takayama Katsuhiko	Takashi Watanabe	April 20, 2025 (Note: Episode 3 was previewed on Abema on March 29, 2025.)
Liam exits the education capsule after two years to find that Amagi has stabilized the domain's finances, although there is still much to be done. He is introduced to the Banfields' fleet and their corps of mobile knights, and is inspired to learn to fight in one of their mecha suits. Christiana responds to an offer of peace from pirate Captain Goaz, but realizes too late that he had bribed her supposed allies to betray her and allow Goaz to invade her home planet Mysteria. Liam and Amagi hire the ronin Yasushi to teach him an allegedly secret martial art called the Way of the Flash, unaware that Yasushi is actually a con artist. Nevertheless, Liam genuinely dedicates to training, even paying Yasushi extra to stay on further. Liam identifies an official embezzling funds and is almost inspired to do so himself before Amagi informs him he had tried to cover it up by frame a subordinate. This triggers memories of his own betrayal, causing him to decapitate the official with his sword. Amagi convinces Liam to replace enough officials with other AI maids to ease the transition to better governance, and the people of his realm start seeing genuine improvements to their standard of living. Afraid of his secret being exposed Yasushi claims Liam should not rely on a mecha's autopilot, but with an older model with much more difficult manual controls. The commander of the mobile knights suggests Liam use Alistair's personal mecha.
4	"First Battle"; Transliteration: "Uijin" (Japanese: 初陣)	Takashi Ando	Takayama Katsuhiko	Tetsuya Yanagisawa	April 27, 2025
Liam decides to repair his great grandfather Alistair's robot, the Avid. Amagi starts to suspect Yasushi is a fraud. Liam summons Imperial Engineer Lieutenant Nias Carlin to repair Avid. Yasushi becomes obsessed with Nias but she ignores him completely. Yasushi vents his frustration by making Liam's fake training even more difficult. Goaz adds Christiana to his collection; beautiful girls he takes pleasure in slowly mutilating to death. Nias finishes restoring Avid as a fully manual robot with no AI. As its movement requires mental focus Avid ends up performing lewd movements when Liam is distracted by Nias' breasts. Yasushi is so jealous he makes Liam's training even harder. Liam becomes depressed when he makes no progress in the Way of the Flash, so Amagi tries to suggest Yasushi is untrustworthy. Liam misinterprets this as his needing to train even harder and after several more years he succeeds in using magic to, in fact, create the Way of the Flash which Yasushi had only faked with trickery. Despite his terror at Liam's impossible skill Yasushi once again convinces Liam he needs even more training, ensuring his employment for a while longer. Pirates target one of Liam's mining planets, so he decides to test his skills in battle by piloting Avid against them. Using the Way of the Flash Liam destroys 30% of their fleet, captures 10% and allows 60% to escape.
5	"Honey Trap"; Transliteration: "Hanītorappu" (Japanese: ハニートラップ)	Uchibori Masato	Takayama Katsuhiko	Hisashi Saito	May 4, 2025
Goaz decides to execute his cowardly invasion fleet. Amagi reports that of Liam's 10,000 ships only 3000 are operational, so Liam decides to purchase new ones. Elsewhere, Nias struggles to sell her new combat ships, since the Empire's generals insist on buying ships from her rival Lieutenant Eulisia Moriselle, whose ships are built for luxury. She suddenly realises her ships might appeal to Liam. Guide decides to visit Liam, certain his negative emotions would have built up from his parents' debt and a fraudulent sword master. However, he discovers Liam has restored Hydra's economy and become a master swordsman. Liam decides to buy the second hand ships the Empire is replacing with the luxury ships, so Guide ensures the crews are made up of honourable officers that will not tolerate evil men like Liam and rebel against him. Nias visits Yasushi to ask his advice on approaching Liam. Yasushi believes she is seducing him and shares his clothing fetish with her. Believing he is referring to Liam, Nias attends their meeting wearing sexy panties, a skirt and stockings. Liam, who recalls his ex-wife dressing like that, is unimpressed. Despite having agreed to buy the Empire's ships he also agrees to buy Nias' ships so she will stop exposing herself. Brian worries Liam might never marry a real woman, but becomes convinced there is hope with Nias.
6	"Treasure Island"; Transliteration: "Takarajima" (Japanese: 宝島)	Takafumi Ando	Takayama Katsuhiko	Hisashi Saito	May 11, 2025
Liam takes delivery of his new ships, paid for in part by allowing Nias to acquire some of the captured pirate fleet for study. Yasushi is certain Liam is seducing Nias and swears revenge. While touring one of the captured pirate ships, the golden dog appears and leads Liam to its navigation room, where he and Amagi deduce that the pirates travel to and from a planetoid that Liam calls Treasure Island. Goaz decides to finish the Banfields and leads his fleet to a warp gate whose staff he has bribed to grant them passage. At the opposite gate, Liam is denied entry by the gate's manager due to his family's bad credit history. Liam personally enters the gate facility on his side but fails to convince the manager to let his fleet through. The manager then excuses himself to accept Goaz's bribe and let the pirate fleet through before taking the gate control crew to break. The golden dog leads Liam to the empty control room where he notices the gate is open but set to exit on his side. Thinking the manager took pity on him to open the gate in the first place, he reverses the warp gate's direction while Goaz is still traversing it, inadvertently ejecting the pirates into the path of a large Imperial fleet on training. Returning to his flagship as Nias has offered to pay the toll as repayment for the captured pirate ships, Liam takes his fleet through the gate toward Treasure Island.
7	"Princess Knight"; Transliteration: "Hime Kishi" (Japanese: 姫騎士)	Yury Kubo	Takayama Katsuhiko	Katsuhiko Nishijima	May 18, 2025
A letterboxed flashback shows Goaz and his pirates destroying Christiana's home planet Mysteria and the subsequent horrors inflicted on her and her surviving crew by Goaz and his mad doctor, which took place many years before Liam's arrival. Arriving at the Treasure Island planetoid and quickly defeating the pirates stationed there, the golden dog appears again and guides Liam to the mad doctor, who then shows off his gruesomely mutilated specimens, including Christiana. Horrified at seeing someone treated worse than he was in his previous life, Liam summarily executes the doctor and orders Goaz's treasure be used to restore his victims' bodies to normal. After returning to Hydra, Nias charms Liam into purchasing even more battleships with the remainder of the treasure. Overhearing Nias' jubilation, an envious Yasushi tries to subject Liam to more torture using drones, but Liam still genuinely believes he is training and generates a magical shield that destroys the drones. Realizing that Liam is now actually skilled enough to figure out he is being scammed, Yasushi declares him a master and flees. Liam loudly proclaims his thanks to the Guide for bringing him to a universe where he is finally prospering – unknowingly much to the Guide's chagrin.
8	"Harem Project"; Transliteration: "Hāremu Keikaku" (Japanese: ハーレム計画)	Sumito Sasaki	Takayama Katsuhiko	Katsuhiko Nishijima	May 25, 2025
Liam decides to increase his evil reputation by amassing more money and forming a harem. He resolves his personal money issues by accepting bribes in gold – despite gold's relative lack of value in his new universe. Forming a harem proves even more difficult for Liam: as his star system's ruler he is already expected to have a harem larger than even his wildest fantasies in order to produce an heir, and his desire to be an evil lord seizing any woman he wants cannot happen when he is so beloved that women willingly apply to join. He decides to visit the city to try to gather a harem but is almost immediately repulsed by the fashion trends of the universe's women. When budget constraints prevent him from hiring designers and models to institute his preferred fashion choices, he ends up settling for working with the women already hired to work in his castle. Meanwhile, Christiana awakens in hospital to find her body restored to its original form. When the attending doctor tells her that Liam funded the hospital and its staff, Christiana vows to repay her savior.
9	"Mass-Produced Maids"; Transliteration: "Ryōsan-gata Meido" (Japanese: 量産型メイド)	Takafumi Ando	Takayama Katsuhiko	Susumu Nishizawa	June 1, 2025
Enraged at Liam's prosperity and popularity among his people and soldiers, the Guide decides to get more directly involved in the universe in order to extract the negative emotions needed to sustain him. Yasushi is shocked to find his name permanently associated with Liam, who still truly believes that Yasushi was an authentic master. In his mansion, Liam laments even mealtimes are boring as they feel too civilized for a gluttonous evil lord. Amagi suggests various guests for him, but this merely upsets him that Amagi, being an AI, does not get jealous of other women. Meanwhile, Liam's other AI maids grow restless as just cleaning his mansion leaves them bored most of the time. They are also confused that Amagi forbids them from being too close to Liam in case it affects his reputation, even deleting their memories of social interactions despite being sexually intimate with Liam herself. After escaping the Imperial fleet, Goaz is persuaded by the Guide to avenge himself on Liam and invades his star system. As Liam, Amagi and his advisors debate a course of action, the Guide then stops time and encourages Liam to take down the pirates for enough money to clear the family debt. When time resumes, Liam declares his intention to fight.
10	"Decisive Battle"; Transliteration: "Kessen" (Japanese: 決戦)	Sumito Sasaki	Takayama Katsuhiko	Tetsuya Yanagisawa	June 8, 2025
Liam grows restless after three days without combat, as it turns out war in space between thousands of ships hundreds of miles apart requires considerable strategy before the fighting can even begin. Goaz suddenly sacrifices 500 ships to disrupt Liam's formation then loses even more ships to bombs Liam concealed with magic, but he forces his way through with sheer numbers while hiding his flagship behind force-fields. Brian urges Liam to do the same with his flagship, sacrificing his front line ships in the hope the delay will allow Imperial reinforcements to arrive. In a rousing speech Liam refuses to let Goaz take a single ship from him and flies out on Avid. With Liam no longer aboard the flagship Amagi is able to move it to the front lines and use its more powerful cannons and armour. Liam's knights follow him into battle despite being heavily outnumbered. Avid's right arm starts to break down due to Liam's repeated use of the Way of the Flash and Amagi calculates their chances have dropped from 4% to 1.2%. Liam's sword shatters but he is saved from certain death by Christiana in her new robot Nevan, provided by Eulisia. Liam summons a new sword and unleashes a massive strike that wipes out over half of Goaz' remaining fleet, increasing their chances to 83%. With victory in sight Liam approaches Goaz' flagship.
11	"Evil Lord"; Transliteration: "Akutoku Ryōshu" (Japanese: 悪徳領主)	Takashi Ando	Takayama Katsuhiko	Tetsuya Yanagisawa	June 15, 2025
With Amagi leading his fleet and a vengeance-obsessed Christiana assisting him on the frontline, Liam finally punches through Goaz's lines and reaches his personal flagship. Goaz attempts to flee, but Liam disables the ship and breaks in. Now desperate to inflict misery on Liam to feed off of, the Guide personally intervenes and grants Goaz superhuman strength and hardened skin to defeat Liam. The glowing puppy – which Liam recognizes as a pet from his previous life – leads Liam to a golden cube that Goaz dropped, and then to a hidden room full of antiques, where he takes an ornate katana as a trophy. Goaz appears and Liam breaks his sword against Goaz's skin, forcing him to use the katana instead. The katana easily dismembers Goaz. When informed that the bounty does not increase if Goaz is brought in alive, Liam decapitates him amidst his pleas for mercy. He returns to his flagship where he tells Amagi he was not expecting such an anticlimatic end to the battle.
12	"Family"; Transliteration: "Kazoku" (Japanese: 家族)	Takashi Ando	Katsuhiko Takayama	Tetsuya Yanagisawa & Susumu Nishizawa	June 22, 2025 (Note: This episode aired at 2:30 a.m. JST, 30 minutes after the original air time on ABC Television.)
As Nias, Christiana and Eulisia try to fete favors from Liam, he is informed that he will be commended for his victory at a celebration on the Imperial capital planet. He is met there by his parents and grandparents who want to share in his success, but Liam angrily banishes them before telling Amagi to slightly raise their allowance to keep them quiet. The Guide tries manipulating the family's resentment to convince them to depose Liam and seize his wealth before having him assassinated, but the glowing dog leads Amagi to overhear their plot. She informs the Lord Chancellor who then refuses the family's request, adding that Liam's reputation and value to the Empire means that any harm that befalls him will be reflected on his family. As the celebration ends, Amagi tells him she will resign as he is about to come of age, but more importantly to prevent his enemies from using the social stigma around AI as leverage. Liam convinces her to stay as their emotional bond is strong enough that separating would only bring harm to both of them in violation of the Three Laws. Liam and Amagi return to Hydra, and he excitedly declares his gratitude to the Guide, overwhelming the Guide to nausea with positive emotion.

== See also ==
- Trapped in a Dating Sim: The World of Otome Games Is Tough for Mobs, another light novel series by the same author
