= Yurie Kozakai =

Japanese voice actress

- 小坂井 祐莉絵
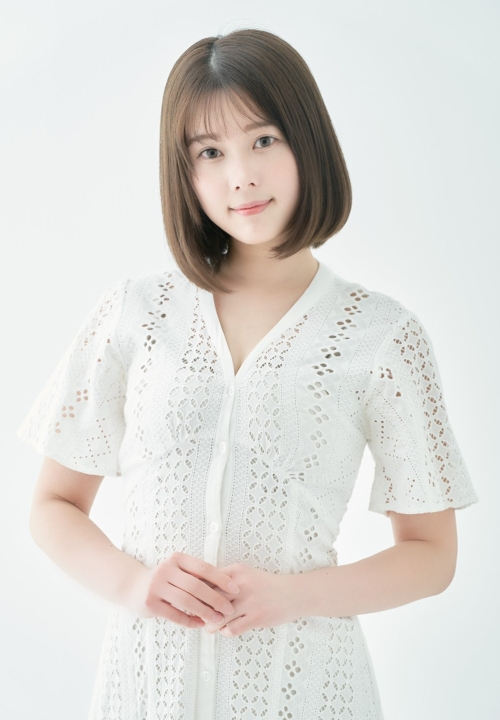
- Kozakai in 2022
- Born: July 6, 1995 (age 31); Higashiura, Aichi, Japan
- Occupation: Voice actress
- Years active: 2012–present
- Agent: Crocodile

Yurie Kozakai (Japanese: 小坂井 祐莉絵, Hepburn: Kozakai Yurie; born July 6, 1995) is a Japanese voice actress affiliated with the talent agency Crocodile. She began her career in 2012, after passing an audition for the role of Mirai Higashiura in Chita Musume., a multimedia project created to promote Chita Peninsula. Kozakai is also the Tourism Ambassador of Higashiura, a member of idol unit Guil Drops, and a ring announcer for World Wonder Ring Stardom.

Her notable roles in anime include Pekola in Dropkick on My Devil!, Yuki Yoshikawa in Horimiya, and Ichika Arima in Koikimo.

== Biography ==
Kozakai was born in Higashiura on July 6, 1995. Having been interested in music since childhood, she took piano lessons at an early age and later became interested in anime when she was in elementary school, influenced by children in her neighborhood. During this time, she played flute in a marching band and was a member of a track and field team. She started to play guitar due to her admiration for musician Yui and was aspired to become a voice actress after watching Bleach. While in high school, she joined a light music club, stating that she wanted to carry a guitar to her school.

== Career ==
Her career as a voice actress began in 2012 at the age of 16, after passing an audition for the role of Mirai Higashiura in the multimedia project Chita Musume., which produced a series of anime shorts to promote her hometown. She and her fellow actresses won Best Performance Group Award at Taipei International Travel Fair for three consecutive years for their roles in the project. She was appointed the Tourism Ambassador of Higashiura in 2014, and joined the talent agency Crocodile in 2017.

She played her first major role as Pekola in the 2018 anime television series Dropkick on My Devil!, which she also performed the series' opening theme "Ano Ko ni Dropkick" (あの娘にドロップキック, Ano Ko ni Doroppukikku), along with her co-stars. The same year, Kozakai became a member of the voice actress idol unit Guil Drops, created by Riho Iida as part of BS Fuji's television program Japacon Project, titled Guild Friends ~Iida Riho no! Sekai e? Honki Desu!, and started to work as a ring announcer for World Wonder Ring Stardom. She graduated from college in March 2019, and received her first lead role as Ichika Arima in the 2021 anime series Koikimo. In February 2023, Kozakai was featured in the magazine Weekly Playboy as a gravure model.

== Filmography ==
=== Anime ===
List of voice performances in anime
Year	Title	Role	Notes	Source
2017	Clione no Akari	Nurse	Ep.4	
2018–2022	Dropkick on My Devil!	Pekola	Also seasons 2 and 3	
2019	B-Project: Zecchō Emotion	Yuzuki (child)	Ep.9	
2019	The Quintessential Quintuplets	Announcer	Ep.12	
2019	Seaside-sou no Aquakko	La Mer	TV special	
2020	Science Fell in Love, So I Tried to Prove It	Aya	Ep.4	
2020	22/7	Ayana Tachikawa	Ep.9	
2020	Super HxEros	Student	Ep.4	
2020	Talentless Nana	Kaori Takanashi		
2020	Sleepy Princess in the Demon Castle	Rus	Ep.7	
2020	Kono Sekai no Tanoshimikata: Secret Story Film	Kanami		
2021–2023	Horimiya	Yuki Yoshikawa	Also The Missing Pieces	
2021	So I'm a Spider, So What?	Yana	Ep.6	
2021	Koikimo	Ichika Arima		
2021	Edens Zero	Shiki Granbell (child), Maria Slime		
2021	Seirei Gensouki: Spirit Chronicles	Dryas	Ep.5-6, 10	
2022	World's End Harem	Maria Kuroda		
2022	Sasaki and Miyano	Eimi Yokota	Ep.8	
2022	Suisei no Freyline: Prologue	Wakaba	TV special	
2022	Miss Kuroitsu from the Monster Development Department	Karen Mizuki		
2022	Aharen-san Is Indecipherable	Ms. Miyahira		
2022	Heroines Run the Show	Negishi	Ep.4, 9	
2022	Log Horizon: Destruction of the Round Table	Sora	Ep.8, 11-12	
2023	My Life as Inukai-san's Dog	Usagi Tsukishiro		
2023	Summoned to Another World... Again?	Ruri		
2024	My Hero Academia season 7	Maina Furasu	Episode 148	
2025	I'm Living with an Otaku NEET Kunoichi!?	Kurena Ventol		
2025	Our Last Crusade or the Rise of a New World	Cystea	Season 2	
2026	I Became a Legend After My 10 Year-Long Last Stand	Milca		
2026	Reincarnated as a Sword	Satya		

=== Video games ===
List of voice performances in video games
Year	Title	Role	Notes	Source
2020	Monster Strike	Ōtani Yoshitsugu, Windy		
2021	Azur Lane	Gromky		
2021	Magia Record	Hotaru Yura		
2021	Girls' Frontline	Pekola		
2022	Heaven Burns Red	Vritika Balakrishnan		
2022	The Legend of Heroes: Trails Through Daybreak II	Flau		
2022	Smile of the Arsnotoria	Peret		
2024	Seifuku Kanojo	Mio Yahiro		
2025	Trickcal: Chibi Go	Speaki	Global version of the game	
2026	Nekopara: Sekai Connect	Luna		
