= Miss Kuroitsu from the Monster Development Department =

Japanese manga series

- Cover of Kaijin Kaihatsubu no Kuroitsu-san volume 1 by Flex Comix

怪人開発部の黒井津さん (Kaijin Kaihatsubu no Kuroitsu-san)
- Genre: Comedy
- Manga
- Written by: Hiroaki Mizusaki
- Published by: Flex Comix
- Magazine: Comic Meteor
- Original run: April 17, 2019 – March 12, 2025
- Volumes: 10
- Anime television series
- Directed by: Hisashi Saitō
- Written by: Katsuhiko Takayama
- Music by: manzo
- Studio: Quad
- Licensed by: Crunchyroll: SA/SEA: Medialink
- Original network: ANN (ABC, TV Asahi), BS11, AT-X
- Original run: January 9, 2022 – April 3, 2022
- Episodes: 12

Miss Kuroitsu from the Monster Development Department (怪人開発部の黒井津さん, Kaijin Kaihatsubu no Kuroitsu-san; "Kuroitsu-san in the Superhuman Research & Development Department") is a Japanese comedy manga series written and illustrated by Hiroaki Mizusaki. It was serialized online via Flex Comix's Comic Meteor website from April 2019 to March 2025. An anime television series adaptation by Quad aired from January to April 2022 on ABC and TV Asahi's Animazing!!! programming block.

== Plot ==
Throughout Japan, there are both evil secret organizations that seek to conquer the world, and superheroes who rise up to challenge them. One such evil organization, Agastia, operates out of a base hidden underneath a front company headquartered somewhere in Tokyo. Agastia's attempts to conquer the world are often thwarted by the superhero Divine Swordsman Blader. This story focuses on Miss Kuroitsu, an assistant in Agastia's Monster Development Department, responsible for creating a monster powerful enough to defeat Blader once and for all. However, this organization operates like any large corporation, as Kuroitsu and her Department are forced to fight for resources and funding with other Departments in the organization, make proposals to the board to justify their costs, or deal with their leader's whims forcing them to redo their designs at the last minute.

== Characters ==
Tōka Kuroitsu (黒井津 燈香, Kuroitsu Tōka)
Voiced by: Kaori Maeda (Japanese); Kristi Rothrock (English)
The titular Miss Kuroitsu, an assistant for the evil secret society Agastia's Monster Development Department, who finds herself forced to balance the outrageous and sometimes contradictory demands of her superiors as she tries to create monsters to fight against Agastia's enemies.
Doctor Hajime Sadamaki (佐田巻博士, Sadamaki Hakase)
Voiced by: Yūichirō Umehara (Japanese); Matthew Greenbaum (English)
Kuroitsu's superior, an intelligent professor who usually wears a high-tech visor over his eyes. However, his laid-back demeanor often interferes with his work, forcing Kuroitsu to fix issues that arise. It is later revealed that Hajime is the older brother of Kenji, but neither one knows about the other's secret identity.
Wolf Bete (ウルフ・ベート, Urufu Bēto)
Voiced by: Satomi Amano (Japanese); Brittany Lauda (English)
A wolfman whose body was abruptly changed to a feminine form before completion after Akashic demanded Bete be "cuter". Bete still identifies as male despite the confusion this causes with coworkers. After surviving his initial battle with Blader, Bete was transferred into the Monster Development Department as another assistant.
Megistus (メギストス, Megisutosu)
Voiced by: Tetsu Inada (Japanese); Chris Guerrero (English)
The Chief of Staff for Agastia whose menacing appearance hides a pragmatic temperament. He often works overtime to keep Agastia running smoothly, and is not afraid to go against Akashic when necessary.
Akashic (アカシック, Akashikku)
Voiced by: M.A.O (Japanese); Meg McClain (English)
The leader of Agastia, a small girl with a flighty personality who secretly wields immense strength.
Kenji Sadamaki (佐田巻 健司, Sadamaki Kenji)
Voiced by: Takuma Terashima (Japanese); Cody Savoie (English)
A 22-year-old convenience store worker who is secretly the superhero Divine Swordsman Blader that Agastia is fighting against. He has a crush on Kuroitsu, as she is a frequent guest at his shop, but is unaware of her real job. Later revealed to be the younger brother of Doctor Sadamaki, but neither sibling is aware of the other's secret identity.
Immortal Camula (カミュラ, Kamyura)
Voiced by: Ayana Taketatsu (Japanese); Emi Lo (English)
A seemingly-immortal vampire lady known as the "Pluripotent Cellular Executive" of Agastia. She takes pride in her work and ability to audit the departments underneath her. Outside of work, she is a secretly a big fan of a certain idol group.
Cannon Thunderbird (カノン・サンダーバード, Kanon Sandābādo)
Voiced by: Shun'ichi Toki
Conceptualized by Kuroitsu as a giant bird-themed mech with railguns and thunder-strike abilities, the organization's various departments scaled down his design until he finally released as a large, rotund yellow bird with a robotic visor over one eye. He works as a mascot at an amusement park that serves as an Agastia front, but retains his skill with firearms and the ability to summon lightning storms.
Hydra (ヒュドラ, Hyudora)
Voiced by: Fumi Aikawa (Japanese); Felecia Angelle (English)
Originally designed as a monster with regenerating abilities and eight extra heads that spit venom, time and budget restraints resulted in a blue-haired humanoid girl with four heads sprouting from her back that she refers to as her sisters. In addition, each head has a separate personality and they often bicker with each other.
Karen Mizuki (水木香恋, Mizuki Karen)
Voiced by: Yurie Kozakai (Japanese); Macy Anne Johnson (English)
A contract worker from a rural part of Japan who moved to Tokyo for work, she accidentally becomes a low-level henchman for different villains under Matsuyama.
Heiki Matsuyama (松山平気, Matsuyama Heiki)
Voiced by: Nao Shiraki
A foreman for the "Death Staff Temp Agency" who supplies different evil organizations in Japan with low-level henchmen.
Reo Shikishima (式島怜央, Shikishima Reo) / Magia Rose (マギアローゼ, Magia Rōze)
Voiced by: Yukari Tamura
One half of the licensed Magical Girls: Pilia Magia duo. An incredibly short-tempered middle-school girl.
Yūto Higatani (賀谷雄杜, Higatani Yūto) / Magia Zwart (マギアズワルト, Magia Zuwaruto)
Voiced by: Yui Horie (Japanese); Madeleine Morris (English)
One half of the licensed Magical Girls: Pilia Magia duo. A taller boy who is Reo's classmate, his Magical Girl body is that of a slightly shorter girl but with larger breasts than Reo, making her jealous.
Koharu Hōen (峰円小春, Hōen Koharu)
Voiced by: Arisa Komiya (Japanese); Amber Lee Connors (English) (English)
Sadamaki's former classmate who runs the Monster Development Department for Black Lore.
Elbakki (エルバッキー, Erubakkī)
Voiced by: Hitomi Harada (Japanese); Emily Fajardo (English)
Hoen's assistant who enjoys teasing Wolf Bete whenever they meet.
Melty (メルティ, Meruti)
Voiced by: Miyu Tomita (Japanese); Kimberley Anne Campbell (English)
A monster composed of homemade chocolate in hopes of creating a Valentine's Day themed monster to fight Blader, but was abruptly cancelled when her source material was subject to a recall. However, the Monster Development Department kept Melty's design and brings her out on various occasions.
Red Mantle General (赤マント将軍, Aka Manto Shōgun)
Voiced by: Shigeru Chiba
A middle-manager working for Black Lore, carrying out his leader's wishes. After being hit by Bull Head's psychic attack, he immediately quit the company.
Great Leader Kaiser Lore (総帥カイザーロアじる, Sōsui Kaizā Roajiru)
Voiced by: Hidekatsu Shibata
The leader of the evil organization Black Lore

== Media ==
=== Manga ===
Miss Kuroitsu from the Monster Development Department is written and illustrated by Hiroaki Mizusaki. A one-shot was first published on Flex Comix's Comic Meteor website on April 17, 2019. A full serialization began on the same platform on October 7, 2020. Ten tankōbon volumes were released from January 2021 to March 2025.

No.	Release date	ISBN
1	January 12, 2021	978-4866751337
2	July 12, 2021	978-4866751559
3	October 12, 2021	978-4866751719
4	February 12, 2022	978-4866751931
5	August 8, 2022	978-4866752365
6	February 10, 2023	978-4866752686
7	August 8, 2023	978-4866753003
8	February 9, 2024	978-4866753386
9	August 8, 2024	978-4866753683
10	March 12, 2025	978-4866754086

=== Anime ===
In July 2021, an anime adaptation was announced by Flex Comix. It was later revealed to be a television series produced by Quad and directed by Hisashi Saitō, with Katsuhiko Takayama overseeing the series' scripts, Kazuya Morimae designing the characters, and manzo composing the music. It aired from January 9 to April 3, 2022, on ABC and TV Asahi's Animazing!!! programming block. (Note: ABC lists the series premiere at 26:00 on January 8, 2022, which is effectively 2:00 a.m. JST on January 9.) AXXX1S performed the opening theme song "Special force", while Maybe Me performed the ending theme songs "Aimai Identity" and "Destiny". Crunchyroll licensed the series outside of Asia. Medialink licensed the series in Southeast Asia, South Asia, and Oceania minus Australia and New Zealand.

Each episode features appearances by one or more local heroes alongside narration provided by a tokusatsu actor.

==== Episode list ====
No.	Title	Directed & storyboarded by	Original release date
1	"She Cried Inside When the Monster to Strike Fear into the Hearts of Men Was Born into the Evil Secret Society Plotting World Domination"; Transliteration: "Sekai Seifuku o Kuwadateru Aku no Himitsu Kessha de, Hitobito o Kyōfu ni Otoshīreru Kaijin ga Umare Deru Sono Toki, Kanojo wa Hisoka ni Namida Shita" (Japanese: 世界征服を企てる悪の秘密結社で、人々を恐怖に陥れる怪人が生まれ出るその時、彼女は密かに涙した)	Directed by : Yoshitsugu Kimura; Storyboarded by : Hisashi Saitō	January 9, 2022
Megistus, the Chief of Staff of the evil secret society known as Agastia, explains how the group's competition is struggling against superheroes of their own. The Monster Development Department comes up with a new monster that looks like an old man wearing a Nessie-like mascot outfit, holding a sword. Kuroitsu is angry at her superior, Doctor Sadamaki, for forcing her to present an underdeveloped proposal to Agastia's board after throwing the idea together at the last minute. Even though Akashic likes the monster, Megistus soon rejects the proposal. Lacking the time and funds to design another one so soon, Kuroitsu is forced to wear the Nessie costume herself in an ill-fated battle. Later, after buying some takeout from Kenji's restaurant, Kuroitsu and Sadamaki are putting the finishing touches on Wolf Bete, a ferocious wolfman who has been training in a virtual environment until his body can be finished. On the day his body is ready, Wolf Bete discovers his body was changed to that of a wolf-girl, at Akashic's last-minute request for a "cute" monster, but his mind is still that of a wolf-man, giving him gender dysphoria. Later that night, Wolf Bete attacks the superhero Divine Swordsman Blader, shown to be Kenji's secret identity, in hopes of earning a big enough reward to get his expected wolf-man body, but ends up in a draw when Kenji's inexperience with women and Wolf Bete's embarrassment at being stripped naked stop them both from fighting.
2	"The Legendary Emissary from Hell Who Constantly Hears the Screams of the Evil Souls Supping from the Kettle of Darkness Spreads Fear in His Wake as He Awakens"; Transliteration: "Yami no Yutsubo de Musabori Au Akki no Sakebi o Mimi ni Nemuru, Densetsu no Na o Motsu Jigoku no Shito wa, Kyōfu o Tazusaete Kono Chi ni Mezameru" (Japanese: 闇の湯壺で貪り合う悪鬼の叫びを耳に眠る、伝説の名を持つ地獄の使徒は、恐怖を携えてこの地に目覚める)	Dali Chen	January 17, 2022 (Note: This episode was scheduled to air on January 16, 2022 but was delayed as TV Asahi had broadcast special programming regarding the 2022 Hunga Tonga–Hunga Ha'apai eruption and tsunami. It aired normally the next day, on January 17, 2022, at 12:00 a.m. JST on BS11. The episode was released on time on some streaming platforms.)
After Sadamaki comes down with food poisoning, Kuroitsu is forced to take his place on a business trip to Kyushu to observe how a similar evil organization deals with fighting against superheroes. During the trip, Kuroitsu stays close to Megistus, marveling at how he can compartmentalize his brain to efficiently perform work for the company, test the many products developed by Agastia's affiliates, and get rest simultaneously. Even at night, Megistus shows consideration by giving Kuroitsu his hotel room and working overnight at a nearby hostel. Back at Agastia's HQ, Bete is officially transferred into the Monster Development Department as their newest assistant, though he still hates the cute wolfgirl body they gave him. Sadamaki reveals the department's latest proposed monster, the Cannon Thunderbird, a large mecha-like bird monster with railguns and thunder-strike abilities. However, because of the large amount of mechanical parts involved, the team is forced to collaborate with other departments within Agastia, plus their leader Akashic's whims. Over the course of development, the Cannon Thunderbird designed by committee is scaled back until it is released as a large talking bird with a simple visor and headband. The monster is easily defeated by Blader in its first battle, as Blader wonders why Agastia didn't make the monster into a giant mech with tons of weapons.
3	"The Monster in a Perpetual Cycle of Death and Rebirth Struggles to Break Its Chains until Seduced by a Soul Entrapped by Destiny"; Transliteration: "Ikudo mo no Shi o Kurikaesu Yomigaerishi Mamono ga, Sono Kase o Tatsubeku Aragau, Unmei ni Shibarareta Tamashī ni Miirareru Sono Toki" (Japanese: 幾度もの死を繰り返す蘇りし魔物が、その枷を断つべく抗う、運命に縛られた魂に魅入られるその時)	Takashi Andō	January 30, 2022
Kuroitsu struggles after her latest monster, a hydra, is easily beaten by Blader. The original design would have eight auxiliary heads and venom spitting powers, but due to budget and time restraints, her Department can only afford one extra head and no venom. Later that night, Kenji wonders if he can balance being Blader with his part time job to make ends meet. Kuroitsu soon gives the monster two extra heads, but the end result is the same. As Kuroitsu stumbles into Kenji's restaurant, she accidentally inspires him to remember why he became Blader in the first place. Next week, she redesigns the Hydra to have four extra heads. Later, Cannon Thunderbird has an existential crisis after failing a job interview. While working at Agastia-affiliated Leafland Amusement Park, he comes to the rescue of Hydra just as she is attacked by a pair of magical girls. Using a gun and thunder powers, he is able to drive back the magical girls. Hydra thanks Cannon by bringing him a homemade lunch the next day.
4	"The Soul of a Demon Drinking into a Stupor at a Banquet of Illusions While Burdened by Sins that Lead All Men Astray Shatters with Anger When the Young Maiden Cries"; Transliteration: "Hitobito o Madowasu Gō ni Oboreta, Gensō no Utage ni Yoi Shireru Oni wa, Otome no Namida to Ikari ni Yotte Mizukara no Tamashī o Kudaku" (Japanese: 人々を惑わす業に溺れた、幻想の宴に酔い痴れる鬼は、乙女の涙と怒りによって自らの魂を砕く)	Yūki Morita	February 6, 2022 (Note: This episode aired at 2:10 a.m. JST, 10 minutes after the original air time on All-Nippon News Network.)
Blader defeats a monster with magnetic powers by dropping his sword and simply punching it in the face. The next day, an Agastia Executive known as Immortal Camula visits the Monster Development Department and threatens to do an audit of their work. When Kuroitsu begs Camula to borrow some of her pluripotent cells, Camula easily fights off the Department before leaving. Later that night, Kuroitsu attends an idol show to get ideas for her next monster, when she runs into Camula attending the same show. Camula admits to secretly being a fan and buying all their merchandise when she can while Kuroitsu tries to comfort her. The following day, Kuroitsu returns to her department with some of the pluripotent cells from using her handkerchief on Camula. Later, Kuroitsu takes Bete and Akashic to Leafland to inspect the amusement park, but Akashic and Bete only care about playing around, while Kuroitsu checks the monsters working at the park. Wolf Bete gets into a fight with a rival organization's monster, White Alligator. Akashic then destroys the rival monster beyond recognition, forcing the Monster Development Department to try to recreate it before the rival group finds out and retaliates against Agastia.
5	"Saved by a Smile from the Deadly Price Typically Extracted through Deals with Monsters That Dwell in the Deep like a True Ring of Solomon"; Transliteration: "Shin'en ni Sumaishi Mamono to no Keiyaku wa, Sono Mi no Hametsu o Taika to Suru mo, Ichimatsu no Emi ni Yotte Sukuwareru, Soromon Ō no Yubiwa ga Shiku" (Japanese: 深淵に住まいし魔物との契約は、その身の破滅を対価とするも、一抹の笑みによって救われる、ソロモン王の指輪が如く)	Directed by : Hideki Takayama; Storyboarded by : Hisashi Saitō	February 13, 2022
The Monster Development Department is forced to travel far and wide to seek various Agastia executives, each of whom have their own secret lairs, to get their literal stamp of approval on their form. After several days of effort, they managed to successfully collect all the stamps, only to be told by their General Affairs department that two of the stamps were ineligible and must be resubmitted. Later, Dr. Hoen and her monster Elbucky of the rival organization Black Lore pay a visit to Agastia's Monster Development Department to get their story straight after Akashic destroyed their White Alligator monster. Elbucky finds herself attracted to Wolf Bete. Kuroitsu discovers that Hoen was Sadamaki's classmate back in high school. During their discussion, Hoen accidentally reveals that Black Lore is a "black company" that forces its employees to work unpaid overtime and doesn't give them paid vacations, unlike Agastia.
6	"An Unsophisticated Soul Tormented by Powers Unseen Succumbs to Brimming Anger and Yearning to Manifest as a Malevolent Beast"; Transliteration: "Miezaru Chikara ni Shītagerareta Junboku na Tamashī wa, Tagiru Ikari to Kogareru Omoi ni Yotte Ketsujitsu Shi, Ashiki Mamono to Nari Kengen Suru" (Japanese: 見えざる力に虐げられた純朴な魂は、たぎる怒りと焦がれる想いによって結実し、悪しき魔物となり顕現する)	Directed by : Yoshitsugu Kimura; Storyboarded by : Hidetoshi Yoshida & Yoshitsugu Kimura	February 20, 2022
After hearing about the money and prestige that Valentine's Day brings in to different companies, Kuroitsu pitches a chocolate monster to the Agastia board based on its potential profitability. Both Megistus and Akashic approve of the idea. Akashic later visits the Monster Development Department to train Kuroitsu and Wolf Bete in making their own chocolate while working on a monster. Eventually, they create a chocolate-themed monster named Melty. However, news breaks that the vendor they bought the chocolate from had metal pieces embedded in the chocolate. Megistus refuses to release Melty against Blader, as he fears it would ruin Agastia's reputation to have a monster made of tainted chocolate. With no time left to make another monster, Kuroitsu simply hands over a basket full of the chocolate they made to Blader, along with a warning not to eat the remnants of Melty. Kenji is later overjoyed by the gift. Elsewhere, Hoen decides to arrange a friendly sparring match with her latest monsters that use psychological attacks against Agastia's Wolf Bete and Hydra, hoping to save her own position at Black Lore. However, both Black Lore monsters' attacks backfire against the unique traits of their opponents. Back at Black Lore's HQ, Bull Head uses his fear attack on the Red Mantle General, leading him to quickly resign from Black Lore.
7	"The Result of Passions Served up at a Monsters' Banquet Engulfed in a Sweet-Smelling Embrace of Honeyed Poison While Drowning in Sin with an Avatar of God"; Transliteration: "Amaki Hōyō ni Kaoru Kanbi na Doku ni Mayoi, Kami no Keshin to Tomo ni Tsumi no Aji ni You, Mamono no Utage ni Sasagerareta Jōnen no Yukue" (Japanese: 甘き抱擁に香る甘美な毒に迷い、神の化身と共に罪の味に酔う、魔物の宴に捧げられた情念の行方)	Directed by : Mizuki Iwadare; Storyboarded by : Royden B	February 27, 2022
The Monster Development Department goes out to a drinking party after work, plus Camula, who Kuroitsu invited after feeling guilty about her. Kuroitsu and Sadamaki end up talking about work while the rest of the party gets drunk and exhibits different reactions. The following day, Wolf Bete wakes up hungover in Kuroitsu's bed. Kuroitsu later wakes up, and dresses Wolf in some of her spare clothes. Wolf Bete is annoyed by the clothes and Kuroitsu seeing him as a "little sister". Later, the two head to a nearby rooftop garden for lunch, where Kuroitsu tells Wolf Bete her ambition to become an executive at Agastia one day. Wolf Bete is accosted by some thugs after lunch, but before he can attack them, Kuroitsu beats them up herself, explaining that she learned some fighting skills to deal with certain company execs herself. She then tells Wolf Bete she doesn't see him as a "little sister", but more of a "daughter", angering him in multiple ways.
8	"The Sheer Malevolence of the Denizens that Dwell in the Castle of the Dead Seeds Mutual Fear and Hostility Among Their Wicked Rank"; Transliteration: "Mōja no Sukuu Nejiro ni Sumu Ashiki Mamono-tachi wa, Sono Jaakusa Yue ni Dōshi o Osore, Tagai ni Teki no Mata Teki to Mamieru" (Japanese: 亡者の巣くう根城に住む悪しき魔物たちは、その邪悪さ故に同志を恐れ、互いに敵のまた敵とまみえる)	Takashi Andō	March 6, 2022 (Note: This episode aired at 2:40 a.m. JST, 40 minutes after the original air time on All-Nippon News Network.)
Megistus holds a recruitment drive for Agastia combatants. Yuto and Reo infiltrate the event in their Magical Girl forms under the orders of their sponsor's executive. Yuto is scared at how well Reo answers the interview questions, but Megistus refuses to hire them as they are underage, and then reveals he knew they were here as infiltrators the whole time. The Magical Girls then attack Megistus, but he uses his ice powers to dodge their attacks before disappearing. When Yuto and Reo leave, Megistus resumes his recruitment drive. Elsewhere, Kuroitsu and Wolf Bete unleash their latest monster, Bandersnatch, on Blader. Bandersnatch transforms into a giant wolf-like monster after its first form is defeated. The monster is able to dodge Blader's attacks and almost defeats him, until Blader suddenly unleashes his own second form, a blue suit with a sharper sword. Kuroitsu feels distraught at not anticipating Blader would have a new form, but Megistus shows up to raise her spirits. Sadamaki mentions a worst-case scenario where Blader might be able to summon a giant robot in the future. Wolf Bete is excited at the prospect of developing a giant monster to fight it, but Kuroitsu reveals that the costs would be just as astronomical. Later, Kenji contemplates the voice in his suit telling him about the second form of Blader, when his brother, Doctor Sadamaki, returns home.
9	"The Rotting but Heroic Figures of Ancient Souls of the Dead that Congregate in the Abyss Find a Ray of Hope in the Darkness from Pride Pulled from Another Time"; Transliteration: "Shin'en ni Tsudou Inishie no Mōja-tachi no, Sabitsuki Kuchihateta Eikō no Kage wa, Toki no Kanata no Hokori ni Yotte Yami no Naka de Kasuka ni Tomoru" (Japanese: 深淵に集ういにしえの亡者たちの、錆びつき朽ち果てた栄光の影は、時の彼方の誇りによって闇の中で微かに灯る)	Yūki Morita	March 13, 2022
The Monster Development Department brainstorms on a monster that could drag Blader underwater. Akashic overhears them and uses it as an excuse to head to the beach. The Department decides to use the occasion to test their monsters' abilities in water, while Camula drags a reluctant Arachne out for some fun in the sun. Wolf Bete and Cannon get into a heated battle while in the water, when Cannon's electronics suddenly short out. The rest of the group tries to carry him back to shore, when Akashic uses her immense strength to split the sea in two and give Cannon a dry path back. The next day, Megistus scolds Akashic for drawing too much attention to herself and Agastia. Later, Kuroitsu decides to relax after a successful day at work by heading to a pub nearby. After taking a seat inside, Kuroitsu discovers that most of the patrons and even the proprietor are old supervillains and superheroes crying about their glory days.
10	"The Very Concept of the Evil Being that Bewitches Souls Summons New Demons through the Chaos it Brings when it Drowns in Turmoil Over its Puzzling Existence"; Transliteration: "Tamashī o Yūwaku Suru Mashō no Mono ga, Mizukara no Sonzai ni Madoi Mayoi Oboreru Toki, Konton o Motarashita Sono Sonzai no Gainen Koso ga Akuma to Yobareru" (Japanese: 魂を誘惑する魔性の者が、自らの存在に惑い迷い溺れる時、混沌をもたらしたその存在の概念こそが悪魔と呼ばれる)	Directed by : Yoshitsugu Kimura; Storyboarded by : Hidetoshi Yoshida	March 20, 2022
Kuroitsu and Wolf Bete unleash their latest monster, Mummy, on Blader. However, after seeing an ad for a pop idol group, Mummy abruptly runs away from the fight and later returns to the Monster Development Department ask for idol training. With Wolf Bete as her trainer, Mummy begins learning how to dance and exercise, but is unable to sing despite her best efforts, as Mummy's body was only designed for combat and has no proper vocal chords. After Mummy hurts Wolf Bete and runs away, Camula confronts Mummy and inject her throat with some of her own cells, essentially growing a new voicebox just in time for her idol debut. After a successful performance, Mummy, Wolf Bete, and Kuroitsu discover that the producer assisting their efforts the whole time was Megistus himself. Elsewhere, Kenji senses something familiar about this new idol.
11	"The Sacrifice Willingly Attending the Banquet of Evil Gods Must Either Be Eaten and Accept Their Role as Sacrifice or Devour the Evil Gods and So Become One"; Transliteration: "Ikenie wa Jashin no Tsudou Shuen ni Mizukara Omomuki, Sono Ejiki ni Nari Hajimete Ikenie de Aru Koto o Jikaku Suru, Aruiwa Jashin o Kurai Mizukara ga Jashin to Naru" (Japanese: 生贄は邪神の集う酒宴に自ら赴き、その餌食になり初めて生贄である事を自覚する、あるいは邪神を喰らい自らが邪神となる)	Directed by : Hideki Takayama; Storyboarded by : Royden B	March 27, 2022
Most of Agastia's executives, plus Kuroitsu and Wolf Bete, attend an "employee retreat" in the mountains, though Wolf Bete notes that are very few actual employees attending. During the retreat, Wolf Bete meets Skylla, the "Black Beast Transformation Executive", whose body was used as the model for his own. However, Skylla only sees Wolf Bete as a cute wolf girl and keeps coercing him into intimate situations with her. As the various executives try to enjoy themselves, a minor group of superheroes calling themselves the "Assassin Rangers" attempt to destroy the Agastia executives with guerilla tactics, only for them to backfire. The group then calls upon a giant robot that they purchased second-hand to avoid humiliation, but are defeated by the "Curse Dragon Executive" Fafnir. Later that night in Tokyo, Karen Mizuki comes across Akashic, who is mad about being left out of the trip by the other executives, and plays an online game with her to cheer them both up. The next day, Akashic introduces both Karen and her supervisor Heiki as Agastia's newest executives.
12	"Those Sacrifices Saved from Hell by a Black-Winged Devil That Devours Other Devils Will Revere It as God Regardless of Whether Its Act Makes It a Servant of Heaven or Merely a Savage Cannibal"; Transliteration: "Akuma o Kurau Akuma wa Ten no Shito to Nari Eru ka, Hatamata Minikui Tomogui ni Suginu Bankō ka, Tada Jigoku yori Sukuwareshi Ikenie wa Kuroki Tsubasa o Kami to Agameru" (Japanese: 悪魔を喰らう悪魔は天の使徒となり得るか、はたまた醜い共喰いに過ぎぬ蛮行か、ただ地獄より救われし生贄は黒き翼を神と崇める)	Directed by : Mizuki Iwadare; Storyboarded by : Hisashi Saitō	April 3, 2022
Karen and Heiki begin their first day of work as Akashic's personal assistants when Akashic receives an important call. The evil society Zet Arc seeks to buy out Agastia to expand their reach into Asia. When Megistus and Akashic don't respond fast enough to Zet Arc's offer, their leader Zet Acht decides to attack Agastia's assets with his army and perform a hostile takeover. Agastia's monsters end up fighting back against Zet Arc's monsters, with Black Lore and the Pilia Magia girls joining them. However, Zet Acht decides to take the battlefield himself and evens the odds with his battle suit, as well as Zet Arc reinforcements. When all seems lost, Megistus reveals that Agastia has convinced both heroes and villains across Japan to fight together against Zet Arc's forces across Japan, not a in battle of good vs evil, but of Honor vs Honorless. Blader himself comes forward to attack but is quickly defeated by Zet Acht. Doctor Sadamaki and Hoen then give Kuroitsu a device that lets her transform into "Black Blader", while Blader himself changes into his second form. The two are able to combine their power to destroy Zet Acht. After the battle, Kuroitsu discovers that the Black Blader outfit can't be removed without a software update. At the end Blader discover's his crush's ties to Agastia as she comes as a customer once again but in the Black Blader suit.
