= Protocol: Rain =

Japanese anime television series

- Key visual

僕らの雨いろプロトコル (Bokura no Ameiro Purotokoru)
- Genre: Sports (eSports)
- Created by: Team Kitsune; Kotsukotsu
- Anime television series
- Directed by: Yasutaka Yamamoto (Note: Credited as Chief Director (総監督, Sō Kantoku).); Daishi Kato
- Written by: Katsuhiko Takayama; Yasutaka Yamamoto
- Music by: Satoru Kōsaki; Oliver Good; Keita Inoue
- Studio: Quad
- Licensed by: WW: Crunchyroll
- Original network: ANN (TV Asahi, Nagoya TV); MRT, BS Asahi
- Original run: October 8, 2023 – December 24, 2023
- Episodes: 12
- icon

Protocol: Rain (Japanese: 僕らの雨いろプロトコル, Hepburn: Bokura no Ameiro Purotokoru), also known as Our Rainy Protocol, is an original anime television series created by Team Kitsune and animated by Quad. It aired from October to December 2023.

== Plot ==
After an accident that killed his father and left his sister with a disability, Shun Tokinoya's mental duress has led to him refraining from online gaming. Now a model high school student who feels remorse over his past lifestyle, Shun works part-time in the cybercafe owned by his childhood friend Nozomi Inatsuki in order to support his family.

Despite this, an incident pushes Shun back into the world of online gaming. Following the sudden retirement of all players of FOX ONE—Nozomi's father's esports team—Shun learns that the Inatsuki family is in severe debt. In order to repay the money they owe, Shun reluctantly agrees to participate in an online game tournament: Xaxerion Championship.

Joined by classmate Akito Sendou, the three set out to find skilled players to rebuild the team. According to FOX ONE, although they found two promising additions, if Shun does not let go of his guilt, the makeshift team would not win the tournament.

== Characters ==
Shun Tokinoya (時野谷瞬, Tokinoya Shun)
Voiced by: Kensho Ono
The protagonist. He is currently a second-year high school student. His father was killed in a car accident three years prior to the events of the series, which also severely injured his younger sister Mio. He currently works part-time at childhood friend Nozomi's family's gaming cafe. Wanting to help out the cafe get out of its debt, he joins its esports team.
Yū Saegusa (三枝悠宇, Saegusa Yū)
Voiced by: Sora Amamiya
A 16-year-old actress who has recently become popular. She previously played with Shun and Nozomi, playing under the username Explosion-kun (ばくれつ君, Bakuretsu-kun). Because of her popularity as an actress, she wears a mask while playing with the Fox One esports team, much to the chagrin of her manager. She later reveals her identity to the public after rumors about her participation in Fox One spread.
Nozomi Inazuki (稲月望, Inazuki Nozomi)
Voiced by: Inori Minase
Shun's childhood friend who is one year older than him. Her father runs a struggling gaming cafe named Fox One. She cares deeply for Shun and acts like an older sister to him.
Mio Tokinoya (時野谷美桜, Tokinoya Mio)
Voiced by: Momo Asakura
Shun's younger sister who was injured in the same accident that killed their father. As she was disabled by the accident, she needs his assistance moving around. She is later offered a chance to participate in a rehabilitation program but appears to be against the idea, only agreeing to the offer if Fox One is able to defeat Sleeping Owl.
Akito Sendō (仙堂暁斗, Sendō Akito)
Voiced by: Ryōhei Kimura
A childhood friend of Shun who wears glasses. He has a crush on Mio.
Ryūsei Nagamine (長嶺 流星, Nagamine Ryūsei)
Voiced by: Tomokazu Sugita
One of Team Fox One's recruits. He is a fat otaku who collects computer accessories such as keyboards and mice.
Mutsuki Naitō (内嶋 睦生, Naitō Mutsuki)
Voiced by: Yoshitsugu Matsuoka
The leader of the Sleeping Owl esports team. He develops an interest in Team Fox One and in his opponent Shun in particular.
Seshiru Satō (佐藤 星詩流, Satō Seshiru)
Voiced by: Kaede Hondo
Emiko Takanashi (小鳥遊 恵美子, Takanashi Emiko)
Voiced by: Azumi Waki

== Production and release ==
On July 8, 2023, TV Asahi announced a new original anime television series titled Protocol: Rain, also known as Our Rainy Protocol. The series is created by Team Kitsune and animated by Quad. The anime is directed by Daishi Kato, with Yasutaka Yamamoto serving as chief director and overseeing series scripts based on an original story draft by Kotsukotsu, along with Katsuhiko Takayama, Kanna Hirayama adapting booota's original character designs for animation, and Satoru Kōsaki and Monaca composing the music. The series aired from October 8 to December 24, 2023, on TV Asahi's NUMAnimation programming block and its affiliates, as well as MRT. The opening theme song is "S9aiR" by SennaRin, while the ending theme song is "Another Complex" by Somei. Crunchyroll licensed the series outside of Asia. Muse Communication licensed the series in Southeast Asia.

=== Episodes ===
No.	Title (Note: All English titles are taken from Crunchyroll.)	Original release date
1	"Cold Reboot"; Transliteration: "Akirameta Mirai -Cold Reboot-" (Japanese: あきらめた未来 -Cold Reboot-)	October 8, 2023
2	"Foreordained Chance Encounter -Multiplexer-"; Transliteration: "Erabareta Kaikō -Multiplexer-" (Japanese: 選ばれた邂逅 -Multiplexer-)	October 15, 2023
3	"Our Beginning -Astable Multivibrator-"; Transliteration: "Bokura no Hajimari -Astable Multivibrator-" (Japanese: 僕らの始まり -Astable Multivibrator-)	October 22, 2023
4	"A Promise That Connects -3way Handshaking-"; Transliteration: "Tsunagaru Negai -3way Handshaking-" (Japanese: 繋がる願い -3way Handshaking-)	October 29, 2023
5	"Single-Minded Determination -Logic Gate-"; Transliteration: "Mayowanai Ketsui -Logic Gate-" (Japanese: 迷わない決意 -Logic Gate-)	November 5, 2023
6	"Lingering Memory -One Time Programmable ROM-"; Transliteration: "Kienai Kioku -One Time Programmable ROM-" (Japanese: 消えない記憶 -One Time Programmable ROM-)	November 12, 2023 (Note: This episode aired at 2:00 a.m. JST, 30 minutes after the original air time on TV Asahi.)
7	"Innocent Reminisces -Solidstate Memory-"; Transliteration: "Mukuna Omoi -Solidstate Memory-" (Japanese: 無垢な想い -Solidstate Memory-)	November 19, 2023
8	"Turning Point -Flip Flop-"; Transliteration: "Tāningu Pointo -Flip Flop-" (Japanese: ターニングポイント -Flip Flop-)	November 26, 2023
Although Team FOX ONE participated in the professional league Zaxelion Bit Technica League, they were unable to achieve a good result. In front of Shun and his friends, a former fan of Team FOX ONE, Ryu Seishi, appears. Shun and his friends receive some bitter advice from her, and they scramble to find a path to victory for her.
9	"Crumbling New Life -Latch Up-"; Transliteration: "Kuzureru Moe (Kizashi) -Latch Up-" (Japanese: 崩れる萌(きざし) -Latch Up-)	December 3, 2023
10	"Unyielding Wish -XOR-"; Transliteration: "Yuzurenai Nozomi -XOR-" (Japanese: 譲れない望み -XOR-)	December 10, 2023
11	"All Or Nothing -Schmitt Trigger-"; Transliteration: "Oruo・Ana・Nasshingu -Schmitt Trigger-" (Japanese: オール・オア・ナッシング -Schmitt Trigger-)	December 17, 2023 (Note: This episode aired at 1:45 a.m. JST, 15 minutes after the original air time on TV Asahi.)
12	"Promise -Protocol-"; Transliteration: "Yakusoku -Protocol-" (Japanese: 約束 -Protocol-)	December 24, 2023

== See also ==
- Loner Life in Another World and Higehiro, light novel series illustrated by booota
