= Saya Aizawa =

Japanese voice actress

- 会沢 紗弥
- Born: September 9, 1999 (age 26); Saitama Prefecture, Japan
- Occupation: Voice actress
- Years active: 2016–present
- Agent: Stardust Promotion (2016-2025)
- Notable work: The Idolmaster Cinderella Girls Theater as Hiromi Seki; Chio's School Road as Chiharu Andō; Taisho Otome Fairy Tale as Yuzuki Tachibana; Engage Kiss as Kisara

Saya Aizawa (会沢 紗弥, Aizawa Saya; born September 9, 1999) is a Japanese voice actress who was affiliated with Stardust Promotion but is now currently freelance. She is known for her roles as Hiromi Seki in The Idolmaster Cinderella Girls, Chiharu Andō in Chio's School Road, Shizuri Castiella Kasugaya in Strike the Blood, and Yuzuki Tachibana in Taisho Otome Fairy Tale.

== Filmography ==
=== Television animation ===
2017

- Seiren as Rin Sanjō
- The Idolmaster Cinderella Girls Theater as Hiromi Seki

2018

- Chio's School Road as Chiharu Andō

2019

- Chidori RSC as Kozakura Konno

2020

- Kaguya-sama: Love Is War? as Female Student
- A Certain Scientific Railgun T as Female Student
- Monster Girl Doctor as Harpy A
- Higurashi: When They Cry – Gou as Waitress

2021

- Horimiya as High School Girl
- Mushoku Tensei: Jobless Reincarnation as Norn Greyrat
- The Slime Diaries: That Time I Got Reincarnated as a Slime as Kokobu
- Taisho Otome Fairy Tale as Yuzuki Tachibana
- Mieruko-chan as Monster
- Selection Project as Suzune Sakurai

2022

- In the Heart of Kunoichi Tsubaki as Kagetsu
- Engage Kiss as Kisara
- The Eminence in Shadow as Sherry Barnett

2023

- My Life as Inukai-san's Dog as Karen Inukai
- Too Cute Crisis as Kasumi Yanagi
- Classroom for Heroes as Quatre

2024

- Brave Bang Bravern! as Lulu
- The Wrong Way to Use Healing Magic as Amako
- Mysterious Disappearances as Nodoka Ametsuchi
- Alya Sometimes Hides Her Feelings in Russian as Ayano Kimishima
- No Longer Allowed in Another World as Aria

2025

- I'm Living with an Otaku NEET Kunoichi!? as Hina Izumi
- Sword of the Demon Hunter: Kijin Gentōshō as Natsu
- Food for the Soul as Nana Hoshi
- Umamusume: Cinderella Gray as Mejiro Ardan
- Solo Camping for Two as Saya Ozora
- Clevatess as Luna
- Secrets of the Silent Witch as Monica Everett
- Hands Off: Sawaranaide Kotesashi-kun as Izumi Sumiyoshi

2026

- Tojima Wants to Be a Kamen Rider as Lunlun
- Dark Machine: The Animation as Isana

=== Anime films ===
- Orange: Future (2016) as Haru

=== Original video animation ===
- Strike the Blood (2020–2022) as Shizuri Castiella Kasugaya

=== Video games ===
2017

- Trickster: Shōkan Samurai ni Naritai as Rosalyn
- Gyakuten Othellonia as Rinalia
- The Idolmaster Cinderella Girls as Hiromi Seki

2018

- Ange Vierge: Girls Battle as Sealum 999
- Sōten no Skygalleon as Sicily
- Kōsei Shōjo: Do The Scientists Dream of Girls' Asterism? as D. Argedi

2019

- For Whom the Alchemist Exists as Suey
- Megido 72 as Beval
- Z/X Code OverBoost as Pectilis

2020

- 100% Orange Juice! as Lulu
- Kōya no Kotobuki Hikōtai: Ōzora no Take Off Girls! as Madoka, Chiyo
- Brown Dust as Diana
- Kingdom of Hero as Astaroth
- Monster Strike as Marta

2021

- Umamusume: Pretty Derby as Mejiro Ardan

2022

- Heaven Burns Red as Charlotta Skopovskaya
- Azur Lane as Pompeo Magno
- Action Taimanin as Kannazuki Sora

2023

- Brown Dust 2 as Sylvia
- 404 Game Re:set as Ribbon

2024

- Honkai Impact 3rd as Coralie
- D4DJ Groovy Mix as Bell Bessyo

2025

- Genshin Impact as Yumemizuki Mizuki
- The Hundred Line: Last Defense Academy as Eva
