= List of Dōjin Work episodes =

This is a list of anime series episodes of the 2007 Japanese animated television series Dōjin Work produced by the Japanese animation studio Remic and directed by Kenichi Yatani. The series began airing on July 4 on a number of Japanese television networks, including but not limited to, Chiba TV and TV Saitama. The anime is based on the manga of the same name written and illustrated by Hiroyuki, centering on a young girl named Najimi Osana who decides to become a dōjin artist so she can make a living producing dōjinshi.

== Episode list ==
No.	Title	Original release date
1	"Her First XXX"; Transliteration: "Hajimete no XXX" (Japanese: はじめてのXXX)	July 4, 2007
Najimi Osana just got fired from her job, and is looking for a new line of work. She accompanies her friend Tsuyuri to a Comiket event and helps her sell Tsuyuri's dōjinshi which primarily consists of rape manga. Najimi becomes curious about the dōjin world after she finds out how much money a popular dōjin creator can make, and even has runs into one such popular artist named Justice, who coincidentally is one of her childhood friends. Najimi proclaims that she will make her fortune through producing dōjin.
2	"The Naked Young Lady"; Transliteration: "Hadaka no Ojōsama" (Japanese: はだかのお嬢様)	July 11, 2007
Tsuyuri gives advice on how to start drawing dōjinshi and recommends buying some "examples" in the form of an adult game. Tsuyuri takes Najimi to a video game shop, and gets her to buy a popular adult game, despite Najimi being extremely embarrassed at doing so. At home, Najimi attempts to play the game, but finds it too risky with her family there, so takes a ride on her bike to Tsuyuri's house. On the way, she is stopped by a policeman who wants to know what she is carrying, but Najimi runs off on her bike due to embarrassment. Eventually, she is surrounded by policeman and must open the bag the game was in, but it turned out the game had slipped out. The game is later returned to her by a man who saw her drop it, much to Najimi's despair.
3	"I'm...Barely Legal?"; Transliteration: "Watashi... Uregoro?" (Japanese: 私...うれごろ?)	July 18, 2007
Najimi finished her first dōjinshi she entitled "Love Typhoon" with plans to sell it at an upcoming event. However, when Tsuyuri reads it, she tries to turn away the subject by first commenting on the quality of the paper. Najimi attempts to sell her dōjinshi though finds it to be incredibly difficult. The guy she met earlier buys a copy, and Najimi is so overjoyed that she hugs him. Men nearby gather around and try to buy Najimi's dōjinshi to get a chance to be hugged as well, but retreat after Tsuyuri explains that they will not necessarily get hugged by Najimi if they buy the dōjinshi.
4	"Please Stop, Master"; Transliteration: "Oyamekudasai, Goshujinsama" (Japanese: おやめください、ご主人様)	July 25, 2007
Tsuyuri had heard from Najimi earlier that she has recently started working at a part-time job, but Najimi would not tell Tsuyuri where she worked. This leads Tsuyuri to follow Najimi with Justice and Sōra to discover where she works. In the end, they find out much to Najimi's embarrassment that she works at a cosplay restaurant where the waitresses dress up like catgirls. Tsuyuri has a little fun with Najimi by asking her to write "Najimi is a dirty girl" with ketchup on the omelette she ordered. After Justice finds out the man who bought Najimi's first dōjin comes to the restaurant every day, he gets angry and protective of his childhood friend Najimi.
5	"Let's Do It Together ♥"; Transliteration: "Futari de Shimasho ♥" (Japanese: ふたりでしましょ ♥)	August 1, 2007
Justice is in despair after seeing Najimi go into a hotel with Junichirō, and thinking that they were going in there to have sex. Tsuyuri and Justice go to Najimi's apartment to help her with her dōjinshi, but in the process Tsuyuri does a play on words and likens their collaboration to having sex which makes Justice leave in an emotional outburst. Justice decides to make a five-hundred page dōjinshi in order to show Junichirō the error of his ways, even though Justice merely has the wrong idea about Junichirō and Najimi, who insists that there is nothing going on between them. Later at the comic festival, Najimi finds a rival who has about as much experience making dōjinshi as she does.
6	"I'll Take a Shower First"; Transliteration: "Sakini Abi Chau ne ♥" (Japanese: 先に浴びちゃうね ♥)	August 8, 2007
Justice finishes his five-hundred page dōjinshi and gives it to Junichirō to read, though Najimi thinks it will not matter anyway since Najimi is not going out with Junichirō. When Najimi goes to buy a book on drawing, she runs into Kaneru who has been searching for the same book, but there is only one copy of it. Najimi got to it first, so she does not want to give it up. Justice appears with Sōra in tow, and is introduced by Najimi; it turns out Kaneru is a big fan of Justice's work. They decide that for Kaneru and Najimi to get more experience in drawing dōjinshi, that they will meet at Kaneru's apartment the following day.
7	"How Wonderful, the Smell of BaLa."; Transliteration: "Subarashikikana, BaLa no Kaori" (Japanese: 素晴らしき哉、BaLaの香り)	August 15, 2007
Tsuyuri goes to Akihabara into an adult game store and finds Kaneru in disguise attempting to buy such a game to help her with her dōjinshi. Tsuyuri gets the idea for her to become Kaneru's assistant so she can help her sell more dōjinshi than Najimi. Tsuyuri also enlists Junichirō's help by telling him that Najimi will grow faster as an artist if her rival is more experienced than her. Tsuyuri then creates a misunderstanding where Kaneru believes Junichirō to be homosexual and that he is in love with Justice.
8	"I Can See It All!"; Transliteration: "Zenbu Miechatteru!" (Japanese: 全部見えちゃってる!)	August 22, 2007
The next comic festival has arrived, and Najimi and Kaneru are poised to see whose dōjinshi will sell better. At first nothing is selling, and the rivals take a look at the others' work, finding flaws in both. Junichirō eventually comes around and buys Kaneru's dōjinshi, but after looking at Najimi's goes off running without buying a copy, a fact that Kaneru gloats about initially before five guys appear and buy copies of Najimi's dōjinshi.
9	"Something Will Slip Out! Dōjin Competition"; Transliteration: "Porori mo Aru yo! Dōjin Taikai" (Japanese: ポロリもあるよ!同人大会)	August 29, 2007
Najimi and her friends take a trip to the beach, only for Najimi and Kaneru to find out that Justice advertised earlier about a special dōjinshi release in two days time by Najimi and Kaneru. The two dōjinshi authors must now try to create a dōjinshi quick before the deadline. In the meantime, Najimi and Kaneru take a bath, and Kaneru reveals matching shirts she bought earlier in the hopes that it would build camaraderie and enable a better atmosphere for drawing dōjinshi.
10	"Look at What It Has Become"; Transliteration: "Konnani Natchatta" (Japanese: こんなになっちゃった)	September 5, 2007
Still at the beach, and with the deadline approaching quickly, Najimi and Kaneru scramble to finish their respective dōjinshi. Junichirō's brother Ryūichirō comes by to pick up a manuscript of a shōnen manga he was supposed to deliver to a publishing company. Both Najimi and Kaneru manage to finish before the deadline, and on the day they are to sell them, it starts raining. Inside the rest area, people also taking shelter from the rain start buying their dōjinshi.
11	"Najimi's Flying Away"; Transliteration: "Najimi Tonjau" (Japanese: なじみ とんじゃう)	September 12, 2007
Junichirō's brother Ryūichirō is distressed about the ruined manuscript, and needs to find a replacement artist in such short notice. Junichirō gets an idea, and pays Najimi a visit at the comic festival, thinking that she could be the replacement his brother is looking for, but Ryūichirō thinks that it makes no sense for Najimi to be the replacement. Meanwhile, Najimi becomes a buzz on the Internet for drawing faces at only one angle, and soon sells out her inventory. In the end, Junichirō makes an agreement with his brother that if Najimi's latest dōjinshi can be received well with Japanese readers that her story will be published in Ryūichirō's magazine until it is complete.
12	"I Want to Keep Doing It, I Want to Do It More"; Transliteration: "Madamada Yaritai, Motto Shitai" (Japanese: まだまだやりたい、もっとしたい)	September 19, 2007
One hundred of Najimi's books go on sale in a local manga shop, and Najimi is a bit worried that none will sell, so she buys on herself. The last day the books are to be sold, Justice is seen near Kaneru who is buying a copy of Najimi's dōjinshi. This prompts everyone else in the store to buy Najimi's dōjinshi as well, which sells out her books for the second time. Later, just as she is about to stamp her contract, she is told that she will have to quit making dōjinshi after becoming a professional, which leaves her with misgivings of what to do. Najimi tries to back out, but Ryūichirō makes her stamp the contract and attempts to run away, but Najimi's friends help her thwart Ryūichirō's desperate plan. Sōra later signs with Ryūichirō's company and becomes a professional manga artist.
