= My Life as Inukai-san's Dog =

Japanese manga series

- First tankōbon volume cover, featuring Karen Inukai

犬になったら好きな人に拾われた。 (Inu ni Nattara Suki na Hito ni Hirowareta)
- Genre: Erotic comedy; Romantic comedy
- Manga
- Written by: Itsutsuse
- Published by: Kodansha
- Imprint: Monthly Shōnen Magazine Comics
- Magazine: Magazine Pocket (2020–22); Shōnen Magazine R (2020–23); Suiyōbi no Sirius (2022–2023); YanMaga Web (2022–2023); Monthly Magazine Base (2023)
- Original run: August 2, 2020 – July 18, 2023
- Volumes: 9
- Anime television series
- Directed by: Takashi Andō
- Written by: Kaneto Kamifuji
- Music by: Tatsuya Kikuchi
- Studio: Quad
- Licensed by: Sentai Filmworks: SA/SEA: Medialink
- Original network: Tokyo MX, BS11 (censored); AT-X (uncensored)
- Original run: January 7, 2023 – March 25, 2023
- Episodes: 12 + 2 OVAs
- icon

My Life as Inukai-san's Dog (Japanese: 犬になったら好きな人に拾われた。, Hepburn: Inu ni Nattara Suki na Hito ni Hirowareta; "After I Became a Dog I Was Picked Up by the Person I Like") is a Japanese web manga series written and illustrated by Itsutsuse. It was serialized in Kodansha's Magazine Pocket website from August 2020 to March 2022; it also started in Shōnen Magazine R in September of the same year. It moved from Magazine Pocket to the Suiyōbi no Sirius and YanMaga Web sites in March 2022. It also moved from Shōnen Magazine R to Monthly Magazine Base in January 2023, and finished in July of the same year.

An anime television series adaptation by Quad aired from January to March 2023.

== Characters ==
Pochita (ポチ太)
Voiced by: Shūichirō Umeda
A high school boy who suddenly finds himself turned into an Akita Inu puppy. He is taken in by his classmate Karen Inukai, on whom he has a crush, and lives together with her as her pet. Although he wishes to be turned back to human as soon as possible, he cannot resist the charm of living his life as Inukai's dog. Later on in the series, he gains the ability to change between being a dog and a human.
Karen Inukai (犬飼 加恋, Inukai Karen)
Voiced by: Saya Aizawa
Pochita's classmate when he was a human. She encounters Pochita on the street and takes him home with her. Even though she is usually cool and expressionless, she is a dog lover and likes to have skinship with Pochita.
Mike Nekotani (猫谷 ミケ, Nekotani Mike)
Voiced by: Mayu Sagara
Karen's childhood friend and Pochita's neighbor. She does not like dogs and is afraid of Pochita.
Usagi Tsukishiro (月城 うさぎ, Tsukishiro Usagi)
Voiced by: Yurie Kozakai
A girl attending the same school as Pochita. She likes to tease him when he was a human, but secretly has feelings for him.

== Media ==
=== Manga ===
Written and illustrated by Itsutsuse, My Life as Inukai-san's Dog started in Kodansha's Magazine Pocket website on August 2, 2020. It also started publication in Shōnen Magazine R on September 20 of the same year. The manga stopped running on Magazine Pocket on March 17, 2022, and was later transferred to the Suiyōbi no Sirius and YanMaga Web sites. On January 20, 2023, the series was transferred to the Monthly Magazine Base website after the disbandment of Shōnen Magazine R. Kodansha has collected its chapters into individual tankōbon volumes. Nine volumes were published between November 9, 2020, and July 14, 2023; the series' last chapter was published online on July 18, after the release of the ninth volume.

==== Volumes ====
No.	Release date	ISBN
1	November 9, 2020	978-4-06-521493-0
2	March 9, 2021	978-4-06-522734-3
3	July 8, 2021	978-4-06-524164-6
4	November 17, 2021	978-4-06-525904-7
5	March 17, 2022	978-4-06-527304-3
6	August 17, 2022	978-4-06-528878-8
7	November 16, 2022	978-4-06-529976-0
8	March 9, 2023	978-4-06-530744-1
9	July 14, 2023	978-4-06-531913-0

=== Anime ===
In March 2022, it was announced that the manga would receive an anime television series adaptation. The series was produced by Quad and directed by Takashi Andō, with Hisashi Saito serving as visual director, Kazuaki Morita designing the characters and serving as chief animation director, and Tatsuya Kikuchi composing the music. It aired from January 7 to April 26, 2023, on Tokyo MX, BS11, and AT-X. (Note: Tokyo MX listed the series premiere on January 6 at 25:35, which is effectively January 7 at 1:35 a.m. JST.) The opening theme song is "Gyakyū Fuwaku Fraction" (逆境☆不惑☆フラクション), (Note: The opening theme song was performed by the following artists: Miyuki Hashimoto, Yui Sakakibara, and Rita on main vocals, and Airi, Ayumi, Rekka Katakiri, Yumi Kawamura, Sayaka Sasaki, Duca, Mitsuki Nakae, Nomico, Aki Misato, Yozuca, Rino, and Riya on the chorus.) while the ending theme song is "Let's Go My House!!!" (レッツゴー・マイ・ハウス!!!) by Saya Aizawa, Mayu Sagara, and Yurie Kozakai. It ran for 12 episodes, with additional original video animations bundled with the first and second Blu-ray Disc volumes of the series.

At Anime NYC 2022, Sentai Filmworks announced that it had licensed the series, and streamed it on Hidive. Medialink licensed the series in South and Southeast Asian territories.

==== Episodes ====
No.	Title (Note: All English titles are taken from HIDIVE.)	Directed by	Written by	Storyboarded by	Original release date (Note: Censored version episodes were released on select platforms a day before their air dates on television.)
1	"Shake"; Transliteration: "Ote" (Japanese: お手。)	Takashi Andō	Kaneto Kamifuji	Takashi Andō	January 7, 2023
The unnamed protagonist suddenly wakes up in the rain and is picked up by his classmate Karen Inukai. Soaking wet from the rain, Inukai brings the protagonist to her house while he is still confused. While she lovingly dotes on him, she is cold to her own mother. She undresses so she can take a bath with him, embarrassing him as he tries to look away from her naked body. Seeing his own reflection in the mirror, he realizes that he has turned into a dog. Later, Inukai takes him to her room and asks him for a handshake. She then names the protagonist Pochita.
2	"Walkies"; Transliteration: "Osanpo" (Japanese: おさんぽ。)	Takashi Andō	Kaneto Kamifuji	Hidetoshi Yoshida	January 14, 2023
The next day, Inukai takes Pochita for a walk. He is anxious at everyone staring at him and the fact that he can see up her skirt. He pulls his leash to drag her out of the way of a stray ball, but ends up with his head under her skirt. She returns the ball to the children who threw it, but scares them away. He eventually urinates and is humiliated when she records it with her phone. Later, he uses the fact that she cannot understand him to say, "I love you", which he did not have the courage to say when he was human. His next door neighbor Mike Nekotani comes to Inukai's house to study math. When Inukai's mother calls her away, he plans to appeal to Nekotani so she will take him home, making it easier for him to escape and see his parents.
3	"Scaredy-Cat"; Transliteration: "Kowagaru Neko" (Japanese: こわがるネコ。)	Yoshitsugu Kimura	Kaneto Kamifuji	Hidetoshi Yoshida	January 21, 2023
Pochita's plan goes awry because Nekotani is afraid of dogs. A centipede crawls on her without her noticing and when she runs from the dog in terror, she trips, scrapes her knee, and knocks herself out. The centipede crawls into her shirt, forcing him to crawl in and kill it. When she wakes up, he calms her by licking her scrape. Inukai returns and is so jealous that she deliberately stubs her toe and forces him to lick it. She interrogates Nekotani and jealously forces Pochita to crawl into her dress. Nekotani goes home and somewhat gets over her fear by petting him. He is shocked when Inukai strips to her underwear and cosplays as a dog to play with him.
4	"A Dog's Heart"; Transliteration: "Inu no Kimochi" (Japanese: 犬のきもち。)	Yoshitsugu Kimura	Kaneto Kamifuji	Hidetoshi Yoshida	January 28, 2023
Pochita is freaked out by Inukai cosplaying as a dog, then she pulls out a device that supposedly translates dog sounds. Finding this dubious, he says he loves her and it translates it as saying she is weird. Her mother walks in, embarrassing her. She asks if she is weird for only liking dogs. He has a flashback of when he was human. He was a loner who only had Usagi Tsukishiro for a friend and only liked gardening. Inukai said his hobby was not weird, making him fall in love with her. Later, Inukai comes home exhausted and immediately falls asleep. Since she is taking him to Nekotani’s house, he uses her phone to order a package to be sent to the house, to distract them so he can escape and see his parents. He learns from her search history that she has been looking for part-time jobs. She later takes him to the house.
5	"Runaway"; Transliteration: "Dasshutsu" (Japanese: 脱出。)	Mizuki Iwadare	Kaneto Kamifuji	Royden B	February 4, 2023
While Inukai and Nekotani play video games, Pochita plans his escape. The package arrives and while the two express confusion, he runs out and Nekotani tries to stop him. He scares her to knock her down and starts licking her breasts. As he planned, this makes her throw him off and he lands inside his room through the window. He finds Tsukishiro inside cleaning the room and hides. She finds a box of Valentine's Day chocolates and he remembers an unknown girl giving them and saying they were from Inukai. She jealously tears the box apart before crying because he has been missing for several days, filling him with regret. He then freaks out when she starts masturbating while thinking of him. His mother calls for her.
6	"A Lonely Rabbit"; Transliteration: "Sabishii Usagi" (Japanese: さびしいうさぎ。)	Mizuki Iwadare	Kaneto Kamifuji	Royden B	February 11, 2023
As it rains, his mother thanks Tsukishiro for looking after his stuff. She declines a ride home and decides to walk. Pochita follows her, but she spots him, picks him up, and decides to take him home. Inukai and Nekotani are running around looking for him, but he cannot get their attention. As soon as they arrive at her house, Tsukishiro collapses with a fever from the rain. Fighting his embarrassment, he strips her of her wet clothes and drapes some spare clothes over her. No one else is home. She talks in her sleep, lamenting why he never noticed she was in love with him, shocking him, before getting an erotic dream about him. Inukai and Nekotani have been going door to door asking about Pochita. When they notice Tsukishiro's door is unlocked, they enter and are shocked to find Pochita and her naked. She wakes up.
7	"The "Come Home" Test"; Transliteration: "Hausu Taiketsu" (Japanese: ハウス対決。)	Yūki Morita	Kaneto Kamifuji	Hisashi Saitō	February 18, 2023
Pochita flashes back to when a mysterious girl in a lab coat gave him Valentine’s Day chocolates claiming they were from Inukai. He ate one and rewrapped the box before blacking out and waking up as a dog. He concludes the chocolate caused his transformation. Inukai tries to reclaim her dog, but a now dressed Tsukishiro, who named him Senpai, says he belongs to her. They decide to settle it with a contest. They open their legs and the one whose skirt Pochita goes under will keep him. He moves towards Inukai, but Tsukishiro sticks a bone in her panties, enticing him. The girls angrily kick each other, but in the confusion, he ends up under Tsukishiro. However, Nekotani declares Inukai the winner because Tsukishiro cheated. As they go home, he apologizes, but he loves Inukai more. Tsukishiro declares this is not over.
8	"Off to School"; Transliteration: "Gakuen Sennyū" (Japanese: 学園潜入。)	Yūki Morita	Kaneto Kamifuji	Hisashi Saitō	February 25, 2023
As Inukai gets ready for school, Pochita tries to hide in her bag, planning to find the girl in the lab coat. She catches him and says dogs are not allowed in school, but after a begging routine, she agrees to take him. In class, she prefers to stare at Pochita in her bag and is cold to everyone, even the teacher. During P.E., he freaks out when she takes him to the locker room and he can see all the girls in states of undress. They play volleyball. During lunch, he learns she eats all alone. During another class, the students brainstorm ideas for an upcoming school festival. He glimpses the girl in the lab coat walking by and jumps out of the bag, but the students grab him and enamored by his cuteness, give him belly rubs and decide on a dog-themed cafe for the festival. Inukai become extremely jealous of the others giving Pochita attention.
9	"Doggy Panic"; Transliteration: "Wan-chan Panikku" (Japanese: ワンちゃんパニック。)	Yoshitsugu Kimura; Takashi Andō	Kaneto Kamifuji	Hidetoshi Yoshida	March 4, 2023
Inukai proves Pochita is hers by making him do his begging routine. The others persuade her to bring him tomorrow. Tsukishiro watches jealously from outside. The next day, the others bring their own dogs while setting up the dog cafe. Inukai prefers to work on a paper chain outside and alone even though she is not skilled. Nekotani walks up and says her class is making a hotdog stand. She accidentally gets covered with glue, so Inukai hands her his leash while she gets help. All the dogs approach because she smells like hotdogs, and she bumps into Pochita and gets him stuck to her skirt. She panics, removes her skirt, and runs away while dragging him by his leash. She eventually gets tangled in the leash and knocks herself out. He detaches himself from the skirt just as she wakes up, but some boys approach. To spare her from being seen skirtless, he leads her to a hiding spot. She shows him a photo of her and Inukai as children happily playing with a dog and says he was the first Pochita. Ever since he died, Inukai became cold. She cries because now, Inukai only smiles around him while she was never able to make her smile. She then notes his unusual intelligence and voices suspicions that he is actually a human, shocking him.
10	"Pochita"; Transliteration: "Pochita" (Japanese: ポチ太。)	Yoshitsugu Kimura; Takashi Andō	Kaneto Kamifuji	Hidetoshi Yoshida	March 11, 2023
Before Nekotani can continue her train of thought, the dogs find her, making her panic and run. Pochita jumps on her and steers her into the swimming pool, making the dogs give up. Inukai catches up to them and is angry that the two were spending time together, and gets angrier when he ogles Nekotani changing out of her wet clothes. Inukai is disappointed in her paper chain, but he gets some paint and puts paw prints on it, which impresses the class. He starts to lose his resolve to be human again, worried that Inukai will fall to despair if her new Pochita disappears. Tsukishiro appears in a Playboy Bunny costume and says her class is doing a Playboy Bunny cafe. After noting that Pochita is responsive to beautiful women because he cannot help but stare at her, Tsukishiro challenges Inukai to see which of their classes makes the most money at the festival. If Tsukishiro wins, she will get to play with him for a day. If Inukai wins, Tsukishiro must stay away from him.
11	"Doggy Foot Bath"; Transliteration: "Inuyu" (Japanese: いぬゆ。)	Takashi Andō	Kaneto Kamifuji	Hidetoshi Yoshida	March 18, 2023
The festival starts and Pochita and the other dogs are petted by the dog cafe customers, making Inukai jealous. The bunny cafe starts stealing customers, so Inukai gets the idea to have the dogs lick the customers' bare feet. The idea is a hit as it is arousing to the female customers. When Tsukishiro visits, Pochita licks her so well that she practically orgasms. The girl in the lab coat visits for a coffee and to be licked. She asks Inukai how she would react if she learned her dog was actually a human. Inukai tries to shrug this off as impossible, but she keeps harassing her about her question until Inukai nearly has a nervous breakdown. Angered, Pochita licks her roughly, but she barely reacts. When she leaves, he angrily follows her into an abandoned building. She turns around and says she was expecting him, revealing her name is Inari Sakihira.
12	"First Kiss"; Transliteration: "Hajimete no Kisu" (Japanese: はじめてのキス。)	Takashi Andō	Kaneto Kamifuji	Takashi Andō	March 25, 2023
Sakihira says it only took Pochita two months to find her, so she will tell him how to become human again if he puts on a ball gag. She horrifies him by revealing she has photos of everything that happened both inside and outside Inukai's house. The ball gag translates his speech. She says he will be human again if he ingests some of Inukai's body fluids, like through a kiss or oral sex. She then plays footage of his perverted antics and asks if he really wants to give up this life to become a boring human. After some self-doubt, he says yes, but when she gloats that stealing Inukai's first kiss will be worth the scientific data she will gather, he angrily rebukes her, destroys the gag, and leaves. Inukai finds him and after some worry, thanks him for helping with the dog cafe and standing up for her against Sakihira's harassment. She kisses him, but he does not lick back. Some time later, he is still a dog. In Inukai's house, she and Nekotani play with him. When Tsukishiro visits, Inukai strips and tries to breastfeed him. Tsukishiro strips as well and tries to grab him. Nekotani asks if they have gone crazy, but Tsukishiro strips her as well before competing with Inukai for him. He nearly goes crazy seeing three topless girls while Inukai's mother tells them to keep the noise down. Pochita swears he will become human again some day.
13 (OVA 1)	"The Dog Pool"; Transliteration: "Doggupūru" (Japanese: ドッグプール。)	Mizuki Iwadare	Kaneto Kamifuji	Mizuki Iwadare	March 29, 2023
After checking her weight, Inukai takes Pochita to a public pool that allows dogs. Nekotani comes with them, but regrets it when she sees so many dogs. He goes in the water, but sinks and nearly drowns before Inukai saves him. The girls take a break to work out, but Inukai is not as athletic and needs help with the exercises. A little girl loses control of her dog and it chases a terrified Nekotani. Inukai teaches Pochita how to swim. Nekotani, still being chased, falls into the pool on top of Inukai and they both lose their tops. Inukai retrieves Nekotani's top while he retrieves Inukai's, making her proud that he can swim by himself now. The girl and her mother apologize for the trouble their dog caused. As they go home, Inukai says she wants to come here again to Nekotani's displeasure. At home, Inukai is pleased to find that both Pochita and herself lost weight. He is happy to see her smile.
14 (OVA 2)	"School Festival Date"; Transliteration: "Gakuensai Dēto" (Japanese: 学園祭デート。)	Mizuki Iwadare	Kaneto Kamifuji	Mizuki Iwadare	April 26, 2023
During the school festival, Inukai takes Pochita for a walk around the school, which he considers a date. To Inukai's annoyance, Tsukishiro follows them. Trying to lose her, Inukai goes into the haunted house exhibit, where Tsukishiro quickly becomes paralyzed with fear, but Inukai also becomes scared. Since it is so dark, Pochita with his dog night vision is the only one to notice Tsukishiro's top has come undone. He jumps on her and fixes her top, but his movements make her orgasm before she runs away. To Pochita's shock, his leash was pulled between Inukai's legs, making her orgasm and leak vaginal fluids. Some girls approach to retrieve Inukai after Tsukishiro asked for their help. To cover up her embarrassing leaking, Pochita spills her drink on her, which works as the girls pull Inukai out of the haunted house and towel her off. Later, Inukai thanks him and shares the remains of her drink, making him happy he got an indirect kiss.
