= Beat & Motion =

Japanese manga series

- First tankōbon volume cover
- Genre: Coming-of-age; Drama
- Manga
- Written by: Naoki Fujita
- Published by: Shueisha
- English publisher: NA: Viz Media
- Imprint: Jump Comics+
- Magazine: Shōnen Jump+
- Original run: February 25, 2023 – January 25, 2025
- Volumes: 6
- Original net animation
- Directed by: Yuki Komada; Megumi Soga (Note: Episode direction chief (演出チーフ).)
- Written by: Misaki Morie
- Studio: MAPPA
- Licensed by: Netflix
- Released: 2027 (scheduled)
- icon

Beat & Motion (stylized in all caps) is a Japanese manga series written and illustrated by Naoki Fujita. It was serialized on Shueisha's Shōnen Jump+ app and website from February 2023 to January 2025, with its individual chapters collected into six volumes. An original net anime (ONA) adaptation produced by MAPPA is set to premiere worldwide on Netflix in 2027.

== Plot ==
As a child Tatsuhiko dreamed of being an animator but gave up that dream after relentless teasing from his classmates. His friends later started a band and music became his new passion. The band eventually breaks up pushing Tatsuhiko to become cynical and double down on his view of dreams being useless. However, while demeaning a friend's dreams, an unknown drunk woman calls him out on this cynical outlook, angrily yelling at him in the streets. This chance encounter revives Tatsuhiko's childhood passion for animation, and he begins again by uploading a short two minute animation online. He is then contacted by Nico, an independent artist he has long been a huge fan of, who wishes to work with him to create an animated music video for her latest song. To his horror, when finally meeting the artist, he learns that she is the same drunk woman who had berated him about dreams before. She appears to not remember their previous encounter and the two agree to work together. They begin to growing closer, encouraging each other throughout the process.

Nico is eventually contacted by a major record label to have her sign on with them. This unfortunately puts her project with Tatsuhiko on hold since the label will hold the rights to her song. Tatsu instead works on creating a different animation for a local contest and also befriends a couple other aspiring animators at his college.

Nico is shocked when the record label has to put her debut on hold due to an influx of artists from another label that had to close down. Nico asks if in the meantime she could write and compose songs. She submits a song to a competition which may lead to a collaboration with a popular pop artist Miyu. Nico's song is chosen but she discovers that Miyu is her childhood best friend, Miu, who shared Nico's passion for music. The two had a falling out and drifted apart after Nico gave up on music. At first Miyu pretends she does not know Nico, but later pulls Nico into another room demanding an answer for why Nico initially gave up on music.

== Characters ==
Tatsuhiko Hirayama (平山 竜彦, Hirayama Tatsuhiko)
Voiced by: Shūichirō Umeda
The main protagonist, the "motion" of the title, had childhood dreams of becoming an animator. After relentless teasing and humiliation from his classmates he gave up on that dream and his passion for animation. By college he grows cynical and feels that not only his, but all dreams are pointless. Tatsuhiko has a chance encounter with an aggressive drunk woman who berates him after he made fun a friends dream. This confrontation causes him to reignite his passion and try again to pursue animation. Despite his cynicism, Tatsu is actually quite thoughtful and kindhearted. He learns how his actions have both hurt and encouraged others. Through his interactions with Nico he grows as a person as they both support each other. He is hinted to have growing romantic feelings for Nico but is unable to confess due to lack of confidence.
Nico Kashiwagi (柏木 ニコ, Kashiwagi Nico)
Voiced by: Aya Gomazuru
The secondary protagonist and the "beat" of the title, Nico Kashiwagi is an independent music artist who Tatsu has been a huge fan of for years. She is the drunk woman who berated Tatsu though she appears not to remember the interaction. She asks to work with Tatsu to create an animated music video for her latest song. Nico, bubbly and passionate, continually encourages Tatsu to pursue his dreams. He in turn encourages her. Under her cheerful exterior Nico hides a lot of loss and pain especially from her Mom's retirement and the falling out she had with her childhood friend, which is evident in her alcoholism, often getting incredibly drunk and belligerent. She is hinted to have growing romantic feelings for Tatsuhiko but continually covers them up with excuses and her infectious optimism.

== Production ==
In June 2021, Shōnen Jump+ launched an eight-part web series titled Million Tag. On the show, manga artists and their editors competed in a contest, with the grand prize winner getting ¥5,000,000 in cash, a chance to serialize their manga on Shōnen Jump+ with at least one tankōbon volume being published, and an anime adaptation from Netflix. Beat & Motion won the contest.

== Media ==
=== Manga ===
Written and illustrated by Naoki Fujita, the series was serialized on the Shōnen Jump+ app and website from February 25, 2023, to January 25, 2025. Shueisha published the individual chapters in six tankōbon volumes.

Viz Media and Shueisha's Manga Plus service are publishing the series simultaneously with its Japanese release.

==== Volumes ====
No.	Original release date	Original ISBN	English release date	English ISBN
1	July 4, 2023	978-4-08-883297-5	December 23, 2025	978-1-9747-4357-5
Chapters 1-4
2	November 2, 2023	978-4-08-883703-1	December 23, 2025	978-1-9747-5299-7
Chapters 5-12
3	February 2, 2024	978-4-08-883840-3	December 23, 2025	978-1-9747-5300-0
Chapters 13-19
4	June 4, 2024	978-4-08-884053-6	December 23, 2025	978-1-9747-6093-0
Chapters 20-27
5	October 4, 2024	978-4-08-884223-3	December 23, 2025	978-1-9747-6094-7
Chapters 28-35; Bonus Chapter
6	March 4, 2025	978-4-08-884335-3	December 23, 2025	978-1-9747-6095-4
Chapters 36-48

=== Anime ===
An original net anime (ONA) adaptation will be produced by MAPPA and directed by Yuki Komada, with Izumi Takizawa serving as assistant director, Misaki Morie handling the series composition and scripts, and Kazunori Aoki designing the characters and serving as chief animation director with Mina Ōsawa. Takahiro Ogawa will serve as animation producer. It is set to premiere worldwide on Netflix in 2027.

== Reception ==
Robbie Pleasant from Multiversity Comics felt the story was "relatable" and "hard-hitting". He also praised the artwork and its use of small details.

Anime YouTuber Gigguk recommended the manga, saying, "this is a story about art and artists and the struggles that goes into being creative."
