= Renkin 3-kyū Magical? Pokān =

Japanese anime series

- Renkin 3-kyū Magical Pokān DVD Box 1

錬金3級 まじかる?ぽか～ん (Alchemist Grade 3: Magical Pokahn)
- Anime television series
- Directed by: Kenichi Yatani
- Written by: Yasunori Ide
- Music by: Noriyasu Agematsu (Elements Garden)
- Studio: Remic
- Original network: CTC, TVS, TVA, tvk, SUN, Tokyo MX, Kids Station
- Original run: April 4, 2006 – June 20, 2006
- Episodes: 15
- icon

Renkin 3-kyū Magical? Pokān (錬金3級 まじかる?ぽか～ん, Renkin San-kyū Majikaru? Pokān) is a Japanese anime television series that tells the story of the everyday life of four princesses from the Netherworld who are oblivious to the happenings in everyday life in the human world. The name of the anime is often known as Magical Pokaan and shortened to Magipoka.

== Story ==
The story depicts the misadventures of four princesses from the Netherworld: Uma the Witch, Pachira the Vampire, Liru the Werewolf, and Aiko the Android along with Keimie (the princess' invisible chaperone). These princesses are adapting to life in the human world and reside in their Garakuta House (a makeshift treehouse complex with the name being a homage to the author of the same name) in Hikarigaoka (a fictional Japanese city that's not to be confused with Hikarigaoka Station). The girls are faced with small self-centered problems such as finding a boyfriend, blending into society, learning about Earth's cultures, and staying one step ahead of Super Doctor K-Ko.

== Characters ==
- Uma (ゆうま, Yūma)

Voiced by: Momoko Saitō

It is revealed that Uma is a witch, although she is not yet adept at spell casting due to her being a "third rate alchemist". She has a happy personality and finds joy in exploring the human world. When she makes a discovery about the world, she quickly and proudly points it out to the other girls only to be generally the last to discover such things, becoming disappointed when others learn faster than she does. When she is not trying to master spells, Uma reads romance manga. Sometimes when Uma is casting a spell, her skirt lifts up revealing her panties. Her overall design is reminiscent of a rabbit-girl ranging from her hair style that occasionally moves, her pet rabbitlike creatures, and the carrot cushion that she sleeps with.

- Pachira (パキラ, Pakira)

Voiced by: Aya Hirano

Pachira is seen during the course of the anime as a vampire with pointy ears and two small black bats riding on her hair ribbons. While she displays the common weakness of vampires such as a weakness to garlic and holy water, her biggest weakness (at least in her mind) is her small breast size which she hopes to have expanded whatever way possible. She has the ability to fly by sprouting wings, extends her fingernails into claws, and is seen eating regular food as well as having a vampire's traditional lust for drinking blood (although she mainly drinks tomato juice). She turns to ash in sunlight, but it is not fatal as noted in the prologue of episode one as she just ends up in a burnt state. Pachira wears a long coat and cardboard box over her head whenever she goes out. When she goes to the beach, Pachira wears a heavy coat of sunscreen on her skin to prevent her from getting burned. Though Pachira wouldn't show up on any camera due to her not casting a reflection, she can be seen on a thermographic camera.

- Liru (りる, Riru)

Voiced by: Hitomi Nabatame

It is explained to the audience that Liru is a werewolf with her wolflike ears and tail exposed in her normal form. She appears as a tan blonde-haired teenager dressed in a brown leather harness that goes across her breasts, brown fingerless gloves with gold-spiked bracelets on them, blue denim shorts, and white thigh length boots. Liru has an energetic personality and has animal traits such as the ability to leap great distances with little effort, and has enhanced strength, speed, stamina, and senses. Like all werewolves, she is lycanthropic and her wolf form looks similar to a yellow puppy. A minor recurring theme in the episodes is when Liru sees a full moon-shaped object, she immediately changes into her wolf form (though strangely enough she seems somewhat resilient to the real moon's effects). Liru is also shown to have a weakness to silver. Being a werewolf, Liru enjoys eating any type of meat and her favorite type of meat is Matsuzaka Beef.

- Aiko (鉄子)

Voiced by: Satomi Akesaka

Aiko is an android with silver hands and silver boot-shaped feet, an outdated CPU, and low memory size. Her name is a pun of Aiko (愛子, lit. love child). It is a common girl's name, but the "Ai" in her name is written with the kanji for "Iron" rather than "Love". Aiko performs housekeeping duties for the other girls like cooking, shopping, and laundry because of her devoted mind making her the housekeeper of the group. Her weight is 300 kilograms (660 lb) or more which causes problems since her weight tends to break things (examples being an elevator and a ski lift). Being an android, Aiko does not eat or drink which came in handy one time when two snow people served cold food that temporarily froze the other three princesses. She always hopes to get her own human-type body through whatever way possible. When at the beach, Aiko uses a wind-up submarine-type suit to go swimming after getting herself waterproofed.

- Keimie (ケイミィ, Keimī)

Voiced by: Nomico

An invisible woman who serves as the chaperone of the four princesses. Though she does not appear very often except in a narrative part in episode one and narrative parts at the end of some episodes or is heard saying something to the princesses in some episodes, her most notable scene involved an English speaking game where she served a bad-tasting nattō drink to the princess who messes up by speaking Japanese with her also drinking nattō when Aiko messed up. In "The Spell of Ifs Is Dr. ○×△□," she was dressed as a nurse with bandages to cover her invisible body when the episode shows each princess as a doctor.

- Jun (ジュン) and Tan (タン)

Jun Voiced by: Nomico
Tan Voiced by: Wataru Hatano

Uma's pet rabbitlike creatures. Jun is a peach-colored rabbitlike creature and Tan is a black rabbitlike creature. They can spin their ears around like a helicopter propeller to fly, use the end of their ears as hands, and occasionally float around. Tan can also change into Uma's hat when Uma is occasionally seen in her black cape.

- Super Doctor K-Ko (スーパードクターK子, Sūpā Dokutā Kē-ko)

Voiced by: Shōko Tsuda

A semi-regular character who serves as the primary antagonist of the series. She is a busty scientist and an expert on the Netherworld who is constantly trying to get the "scientific community" to see how bad the four princesses are ... for her own status gain. Super Doctor K-Ko wants proof of the supernatural to gain admittance into the scientific elite and what better than if one or all of the princesses are either captured in her traps or exposed on TV ... if her plans did not have a tendency to go awry.

- Hongo (本郷, Hongō)

Voiced by: Kishō Taniyama

Hongo is Super Doctor K-Ko's midget assistant. He assists Super Doctor K-Ko in her quest to expose the princesses as Netherworld monsters.

== Episodes ==
Each of the episodes were split into two segments.

No.	Title	Original release date
1	"The First Spell Is an Easy Trap/The Afternoon Special Is a Red Cap" "Hajimete no Jumon wa Amai Wana/Gogo no Jumon wa Akai Kabu" (はじめての呪文は甘い罠/午後の呪文は赤いカブ)	April 4, 2006
A. Super Doctor K-Ko and Hongo have devised traps that end up trapping Pachira, Liru, and Aiko. Thus, Uma ends up coming to the rescue. B. Upon learning about mail, Uma tries to build a mailbox with Aiko's help so that the girls can receive mail. Then the next part involves trying to get the mailman on their route to give them mail.
2	"The Spell of the Moon Is a Blood Pedigree/The Make-Believe Spell Is TV Shopping" "Tsuki no Jumon wa Chi no Keifu/Mayakashi no Jumon wa Terebi Shoppingu" (月の呪文は血の系譜/まやかしの呪文はTVショッピング)	April 11, 2006
A. Following an incident at the prehistoric mammal section of the museum, Liru discovers love when she meets a man named Ryo who turns out to be another werewolf. B. While watching TV, Uma and Pachira learn about home shopping when they see an Electric Trainer (a type of fitness belt) on TV. When Uma orders the Electric Trainer, the other girls get interested in TV shopping until they learn that home shopping includes having to pay for the stuff.
3	"Tomorrow's Spell Is Donation for Love/The Spell of Happiness Is an Ideal Man" "Ashita no Jumon wa Ai no Kenketsu/Shiawase no Jumon wa Risō no Dansei" (明日の呪文は愛の献血/幸せの呪文は理想の男性)	April 18, 2006
A. When encountering a cute guy outside of a Blood Donation Bus, Pachira ends up donating some of her blood and ends up weak. This ends up tempting her to try to suck blood from Uma and Liru. B. While in a movie theater, the girls discuss their dream boyfriend. When Aiko's weight ends up disabling an elevator, the girls talk about how they would meet their dream boyfriend while stripping into their underclothes when the elevator gets warmer.
4	"The Secret Spell Is the Beginning of the Rainy Season/The Spell of Relativity Is Tanabata, The Star Festival" "Naisho no Jumon wa Baiu Zensen/Mimiyori na Jumon wa Tanabata Matsure" (ないしょの呪文は梅雨前線/耳寄りな呪文は七夕祭れ)	April 25, 2006
A. During the rainy season, Aiko's systems are covered in mildew making her voice sound bad. While Liru is playing in the rain, Uma and Pachira try to clean Aiko's systems upon deactivating her. B. A heat wave has struck Hikarigaoka and the girls learn that Tanabata occurs on the 7th of July while deciding what wish should be granted by it.
5	"A Tiring Spell Is a Trip to the Beach/Love's Spell Is a Trip to the Beach" "Datsuryoku no Jumon wa Kaisuiyoku/Koi no Jumon wa Kaisuiyoku" (脱力の呪文は海水浴/恋の呪文は海水浴)	May 2, 2006
A. When a typhoon ruins their day at the beach, the girls try to improvise at the nearest hotel. B. Following an accident with their floats, the girls are saved from drowning by Lulu, a mermaid who is the princess of the merfolk. They soon help her in obtaining a boy that she has a crush on, who Yuma ends up taking. Lulu finds a mate in a jellyfish and, at the end of the episode, Yuma and the other Nether princess have a fight. The girls (excluding Yuma) go home, while Yuma and the boy go for a swim, and the boy turns out to be a spirit leading Yuma to her doom.
6	"The Spell of Rebirth Is a Search Through Hell/A Healing Spell Is a Park Debut" "Saisei no Jumon wa Jigoku Tanbō/Iyashi no Jumon wa Kōen Debyū" (再生の呪文は地獄探訪/癒しの呪文は公園デビュー)	May 9, 2006
A. In a follow-up to the ending of the previous episode, Uma has died and is condemned to Hell by Enma (played by Super Doctor K-Ko). In each level of Hell, Uma encounters hellish and demonic counterparts of her fellow princesses where she ends up driving them crazy. B. With help from Jun, Tan, and Liru's werewolf form, Uma performs magic tricks in the park to entertain the people there and show off her magic.
7	"A Rich-Flavored Spell Is the Night of the Full Moon/A Combining Spell Is the Invincible Robot, M5" "Mattari no Jumon wa Jūgoya/Gattai no Jumon wa Muteki Robotto Emu Faibu" (まったりの呪文は十五夜/合体の呪文は無敵ロボットM5)	May 16, 2006
A. Liru prepares for the viewing of the Full Moon by obtaining the supplies to it and finding a perfect spot in the park to view the Full Moon at. B. In this Super Robot-type segment, Uma, Pachira, Liru, and Keimie act out as Magical 5 to save their teammate Aiko and their fuel company from a giant Mecha-Hongo robot created by Super Doctor K-Ko.
8	"Tonight's Spell Is a Vampire/The Spell of Dreams Is Magic That Lasts One Day" "Kon'ya no Jumon wa Kyūketsuki/Yume no Jumon wa Ichinichi dake no Mahō" (今夜の呪文は吸血鬼/夢の呪文は一日だけの魔法)	May 23, 2006
A. People throughout Hikarigaoka are being attacked by a vampire at night. Jun, Tan, and Liru each suspect Pachira for the attacks upon seeing her silhouette attack someone. Pachira suspects that someone else is behind these attacks. B. Aiko wins Happy Chalk from a prize in Makai Teen Magazine which can bring anything that's drawn to life. Since it can only work for a witch, Uma uses it to draw various things including drawing up a galactic train to take them to the Andromeda Galaxy in one of Aiko's attempts to gain a human body.
9	"The Spell of Breaching Is Inviting a Love Interest Home/The White Spell Is Christmas" "Zekkō no Jumon wa Irootoko-san Irasshāi/Shiro no Jumon wa Kurisumasu" (絶交の呪文は色男さんいらしゃーい/白の呪文はクリスマス)	May 30, 2006
A. While out getting Ishiyakiimo (yams baked on hot stones), Liru ends up saving a guy from being beaten up. She then ends up seeing a fallen CD with its shape turning her into her werewolf form. When Aiko invites him to their house, Liru doesn't want to be seen in her current form and Pachira wants him to herself. B. After reading a Christmas story, the girls prepare for Christmas ranging from Aiko making a metal stocking, the girls preparing a Christmas feast, the girls solving their chimney problem, and the girls preparing for the arrival of Santa Claus.
10	"The Cold Spell Is a Snowboard Ski/The Hot Spell Is a Spontaneous Onsen" "Kōrudo no Jumon wa Sunobosukī/Hotto na Jumon wa Tennen Onsen" (コールドの呪文はスノボスキー/ホットな呪文は天然温泉)	June 6, 2006
A. The girls hit the slopes and learn how to ski. When they fail to make a reservation at one of the lodges, they end up staying with some snow people who attempt to add them to their frozen collection. B. While walking through the woods, the girls find a hot spring that Liru told them about and end up encountering women who turn out to be Tanukis that end up stealing their clothes.
11	"The Spell of Reticence Is Having Fun with English Conversation/The Crisis Spell Is the Other Side of Goodbye" "Mukuchi na Jumon wa Tanoshii Eikaiwa/Pinchi no Jumon wa Sayonara no Mukōgawa" (無口な呪文は楽しい英会話/ピンチの呪文はさよならの向こう側)	June 13, 2006
A. The girls play a "speaking English" game hosted by Keimie and a mess-up has them drinking the bad-tasting Natto drink. B. The girls see Super Doctor K-Ko on a TV show revolving on the theory of horror movie monsters existing amongst the human race. When the co-host of the TV show ends up discovering the girl's secret thanks to footage used by Super Doctor K-Ko, it is then made public. The girls experience fame up to the point where they end up on a discussion show against Super Doctor K-Ko in the discussion if monsters from the Netherworld are dangerous.
12	"The Spell of Grief Is When Memories Change/The Gentle Spell Is a Magician" "Aishū no Jumon wa Omoide ni Kawaru Toki/Yasashii Jumon wa Mahōtsukai" (哀愁の呪文は想い出に変わるとき/優しい呪文は魔法使い)	June 20, 2006
A. Aiko finds a VCR that contains her memories as a rerun of the girls' favorite show is airing. When the girls plan to use the VCR to tape it, they end up needing D/A Converter to hook it up to their Digital Television and search the entire country for one. B. When Uma ends up with a cold, she ends up getting the other girls infected with her magic when they make fun of her. With her magic perfected, she practices it on the town. After curing herself and the other girls of the cold, they soon work on a way to make a Cherry Blossom Tree in front of a hospital bloom early when Uma runs out of magic.

The following episodes were exclusive to the DVDs.

No.	Title	Original release date
OVA–1	"The Spell of Skewed Legend Is Momotaro" "Dassetsu no Jumon wa Momotarō" (脱説の呪文は桃太郎)	June 23, 2006
In this segment, a pear-shaped capsule containing a rejected MOMO (acronym of Military convert Ops Mechanical Operative) android of the Kasuga Institute named MOMO9000 (played by Aiko) is lost in a road accident that caused it to fall into the river. It is later found by an old couple who mistake MOMO9000 as Momotarō. After reading the story of Momotaro, MOMO9000 heads out to Onigashima to slay some Oni while gaining allies in a dog (played by Liru), a monkey (played by Uma), and a pheasant (played by Pachira).
OVA–2	"The Spell of Ifs Is Dr. ○×△□" "Ifu no Jumon wa Dokutā Maru Batsu Sankaku Shikaku" (ifの呪文はDr.○×△□)	August 25, 2006
Super Doctor K-Ko shows viewers what would happen if a doctor was either a witch, a vampire, a werewolf, or an android.
OVA–3	"The Priceless Spell of Valentine's Day" "Taisetsu na Jumon wa Barentain Dē" (大切な呪文はバレンタイン・デー)	October 25, 2006
The girls learn about Valentine's Day and figure out who should be their Valentine.

== Staff ==
- Original Story: Garakuta House
- Director: Kenichi Yatagai
- Composition, Script: Yasunori Ide
- Character Design, General Production Director: Katsuzō Hirata
- Prop Design: Yoshihiro Watanabe
- Art Design: Naomi Igata (KUSANAGI)
- Art Director: Ayū Kawamoto (KUSANAGI)
- Color Design: Yukiharu Obata
- Photography Directors: Junichi Watanabe, Tsugio Ozawa
- Editor: Masahiro Matsumura
- Sound Effects Director: Hiroyuki Matsuoka
- Sound Effects Production: Half HP Studio
- Music: Noriyasu Agematsu
- Music Production: Lantis
- Production: Genco
- Animation Production: REMIC
- Production Assistance: Studio Gash
- Produced by Magipoka-dan

== Theme songs ==
Opening theme
Senketsu no Chikai (鮮血の誓い), sung by Yōsei Teikoku (band, meaning 'Fairy Empire')
Ending theme
Shichaimashō (しちゃいましょう), lyrics by Yasunori Ide, composed by Hiroki, sung by various voice actresses from the show:

Episode	Song title	Sung by	Character
1	Shichaimashō sensuous	Momoko Saitō	Uma
2	Shichaimashō predator	Hitomi Nabatame	Liru
3	Shichaimashō suggestive	Aya Hirano	Pachira
4	Shichaimashō devoted	Satomi Akesaka	Aiko
5	Shichaimashō sensuous	Nomico	
6	Shichaimashō suggestive	Nomico	
7	Shichaimashō predator	Nomico	
8	Shichaimashō devoted	Nomico	
9	Same as episode 3 ED		
10	Same as episode 2 ED		
11	Same as episode 4 ED		
12	None		
OVA	Shichaimashō invisible	Nomico	Keimie

== CDs ==
Lantis has released three CD albums:

- TV Anime "Renkin 3-kyū Magical ? Pokān" Original Drama CD (TVアニメ「錬金3級まじかる?ぽか～ん」オリジナルドラマCD, Terebi Anime "Renkin 3-kyū Majikaru ? Pokān" Orijinaru Dorama Shīdī)
  LACA-5529, ¥2500, June 21, 2006
- "Majipoka" Ending Theme Song "Let's Do It" (「まじぽか」エンディング主題歌集『しちゃいましょう』, "Majipoka" Endingu Shudaika Shū "Shichaimashō")
  LACA-5517, ¥1800, May 24, 2006
- "Majipoka" Opening Theme Song "Blood Oath" (「まじぽか」オープニング主題歌『鮮血の誓い』, "Majipoka" Ōpuningu Shudaika "Senketsu no Chikai")
  LACM-4257, ¥1200, April 26, 2006 (maxi-single)
