= Katanagatari =

Japanese light novel series by Nisio Isin and Take

- The cover of the first volume as published by Kodansha

刀語
- Genre: Action, historical, romance
- Light novel
- Written by: Nisio Isin
- Illustrated by: Take
- Published by: Kodansha
- English publisher: NA: Vertical
- Imprint: Kodansha Box
- Original run: January 2007 – December 2008
- Volumes: 12 + 1 spinoff
- Anime television series
- Directed by: Keitarō Motonaga
- Produced by: Hideo Katsumata (Chief); Osamu Yoshiba (Chief); Kōji Yamamoto (Chief); Yōsuke Toba; Masayuki Hariu; Noriko Ozaki
- Written by: Makoto Uezu
- Music by: Taku Iwasaki
- Studio: White Fox
- Licensed by: NA: NIS America
- Original network: Fuji TV
- Original run: January 26, 2010 – December 11, 2010
- Episodes: 12

Katanagatari (Japanese: 刀語; "Sword Tale") is a Japanese light novel series written by Nisio Isin and illustrated by Take. The series is published by Kodansha under the Kodansha Box imprint. The story revolves around a katanagari, or "sword hunt" for 12 weapons that were created by a single swordsmith. An anime adaptation by White Fox began airing on January 26, 2010, and consisted of 12 episodes. A single episode of the series was aired each month. NIS America have licensed the series and released the first part on a Blu-ray/DVD combo set in July 2011. Part two was released on September 20, 2011. The anime series aired once more on Fuji TV's noitamina between April and November 2013 as the block's first rerun, with a new opening and a new ending song.

== Plot and setting ==
Katanagatari is the story of Shichika Yasuri, a swordsman who fights without a sword, and Togame, an swordswoman ambitious young strategist. They traverse Edo-era Japan for the purpose of gathering 12 mythical Deviant Blades on behalf of the shogunate. Shichika is the son of an exiled mercenary, the last head of the Kyotouryuu school of fighting that only knows how to be a weapon, not a human being. Togame seeks him out even though he is the son of her father's murderer, she believes Kyotoryuu is the strongest fighting style and that she can convince him to take on the task out of love. Togame has been betrayed by others she's hired for money or fame, so she believes that love is the only thing that can overcome the desire to steal the collected swords from her. The story chronicles their travels across Japan as they hunt down the Deviant Blades. Together, they build their own legacies, with Shichika learning how to be a person instead of a weapon, and Togame falling in love with him, beginning to see the world past her ambitions.

=== The Deviant Blades ===
The main focus of the story is the gathering of twelve distinct weapons that were crafted by Kiki Shikizaki, a reclusive swordsmith. His bladework had been widely popular during the last war, but now twelve of the one thousand swords he made have been named "Deviant" because they are rumored to have been specially crafted via alchemy, the occult, and other mystical means. Although they are supposedly "katana", not all of them are swords. Each does have a distinctive feature or ability, sometimes existing in a different form like armor or a pair of guns. The blades are said to emit a "poison" that prevents their wielder from giving them away, they will do anything to keep the weapon to themselves. It is revealed that Shikizaki was seeking to create the ultimate Deviant Blade, which is Shichika's family's bare-handed Kyotōryū fighting style. The grim conditions to "perfect" the blade are eventually met.
Kanna (絶刀「鉋」, Zettō Kanna; [Absolute sword, Plane])
The first blade retrieved by Shichika and Togame from Koumori Maniwa. The blade is straight unlike most katanas, and it is the hardest blade with the ability to never break or bend. The hilt is neatly decorated with plum flower designs. This blade is strongly based on the real life Dōtanuki.
Namakura (斬刀「鈍」, Zantō Namakura; [Beheading sword, Blunt])
The second blade recovered was in the possession of Ginkaku Uneri. It is the sharpest blade with the ability to cut through anything, in sharp contrast to its ironic name, meaning "blunt". It was also made specifically for unsheathing at incredible speeds. The katana has triangular patterns around its hilt guard and a black sheath.
Tsurugi (千刀「剣」, Sentō Tsurugi; [Thousand sword, Sword])
Considered to be one sword, it actually comprises 1000 swords, with the last 999 being copies of the first. All 1000 of them are in the possession of Meisai Tsuruga. It has the ability to overwhelm its enemy with its sheer numbers. What makes them stand out is their red sheaths. However, despite their identical appearances, Shichika is able to identify the original sword.
Hari (薄刀「針」, Hakutō Hari; [Thin sword, Needle])
An extremely thin blade as per its namesake, meaning "needle", it is in the possession of Hakuhei Sabi. It is the brittlest blade as the blade itself is made of glass, which gives it its light weight, and is rather fragile if used incorrectly. The sheath and hilt are white and decorated with floral patterns.
Yoroi (賊刀「鎧」, Zokutō Yoroi; [Bandit sword, Armor])
A massive full set of armor, it is in the possession of Kanara Azekure. It is the most defense-oriented blade with the ability to protect the user from any damage, especially against attacks that have armor-piercing properties. Its design was based on Western armor, and it has numerous blades around it. The armor is decorated with many references to the ocean, such as shells and a helmet that's based on a whale.
Kanazuchi (双刀「鎚」, Sōtō Kanazuchi; [Double sword, Hammer])
A large, blunt-looking, stone sword, it comes into the possession of Konayuki Itezora. It is extremely heavy, capable of leaving a crater even when it is simply dropped. Only Konayuki is capable of wielding it with extreme ease and it can crush the enemy with its weight. The sword can also be held by its tip, and used as a hammer instead, hence its "double" title.
Bita (悪刀「鐚」, Akutō Bita; [Evil sword, Worthless])
A small yellow kunai-like weapon, it comes into the possession of Nanami Yasuri. It holds electricity within it and was designed with the appearance of a lightning bolt. It is the most evil blade with the ability to rejuvenate the user's body.
Kanzashi (微刀「簪」, Bitō Kanzashi; [Delicate sword, Hairpin])
A four-armed, four-legged, solar powered clockwork mechanical doll that seems to function on its own. It has the ability to think by itself and adapt to any situation. It wears a kimono and tall black shoes. Each of its arms hold a sword, and an extra one is hidden in its mouth. Its appearance, made in the image of the woman its creator loved, changes according to the situation, becoming more menacing.
Nokogiri (王刀「鋸」, Ōtō Nokogiri; [King sword, Saw])
A wooden sword that sharply contrasts its title as "King of Swords", it is in the possession of Zanki Kiguchi. Unlike the other Deviant Blades, it doesn't have any of the poison found in Shikizaki's blades. It is the purest blade with the ability to cure the poison the other swords have on their owners. A small floral mark and yellowish streak on the sword identifies it as Nokogiri.
Hakari (誠刀「銓」, Seitō Hakari; [True sword, Scales])
A sword with no blade, it is in the possession of Rinne Higaki. The blade itself is not meant to "cut" anyone other than its owner. The hilt (tsuka) is black and decorated with orange floral patterns, and a wreath of flowers circle as the guard (tsuba). It is the most trustworthy blade with the ability to weigh the user's heart.
Mekki (毒刀「鍍」, Dokutō Mekki; [Poison sword, Gilded])
A black, jagged katana decorated with iridescent designs, obtained by Houou Maniwa. The blade also gives off a dark cloudy aura. This blade originally has no owner as it was found inside of a crystal-like spire in a cave, preserving it. It is the most poisonous blade with the ability to corrupt the user. The blade itself contains a part of the spirit of Shikizaki within it.
Jū (炎刀「銃」, Entō Jū; [Flame sword, Gun])
A pair of handguns, one a blue six-chambered revolver and the other a red semi-automatic that holds eleven bullets, both are in the possession of Princess Hitei and used by her retainer, Emonzaemon. Each is decorated with a long flowing mane with a bead on its end. The guns appear to fire an unlimited amount of ammunition, as Emonzaemon is not seen reloading them even after firing dozens of rounds.
Yasuri (虚刀「鑢」, Kyotō Yasuri; [Empty Sword, Rasp])
The Kyotōryu style itself, as a bare-handed style founded by Shichika's ancestor, Kazune Yasuri, along with Shikizaki. In contrast with the other twelve swords, which are labeled as "Perfected Deviant Blades," Kyotōryu is called by Shikizaki a "Completed Deviant Blade," as Shichika had "forged" it himself throughout his journeys, as was Shikizaki's intent with its creation. Due to the nature of Kyotōryu, this "sword" is by nature antithetical to the other twelve.

== Media ==
=== Light novels ===
Katanagatari was released one volume a month throughout 2007. A spin-off novel, Maniwagatari, was released a year later. During their panel at Anime Boston on March 30, 2018, English light novel publisher Vertical announced that they had licensed the series. They released it as four 3-in-1 omnibus volumes from November 2018 to August 2020.

No.	Title	Original release date	English release date
01	Book One: Zetto the Leveler; Daiichi-wa Zettō Kanna (第一話 絶刀・鉋)	January 10, 2007; 978-4-06-283611-1	November 27, 2018; 978-1-947194-32-8
Prologue (序章, Joshō); 1. Haphazard Island (不承島, Fushōshima); 2. Enter the Maniwa (真庭忍軍, Maniwa Ningun); 3. The Schemer (奇策士, Kisaku-shi); Epilogue (終章, Shūshō)
02	Book Two: Zanto the Razor; Daini-wa Zantō Namakura (第二話 斬刀・鈍)	February 2, 2007; 978-4-06-283604-3	November 27, 2018; 978-1-947194-32-8
Prologue (序章, Joshō); 1. Inaba Desert (因幡砂漠, Inaba Sabaku); 2. Ginkaku Uneri (宇練銀閣, Uneri Ginkaku); 3. Rakka Rozeki (落花狼藉, Rakka Rōzeki); Epilogue (終章, Shūshō)
03	Book Three: Sento the Legion; Daisan-wa Sentō Tsurugi (刀語 第三話 千刀・ツルギ)	March 2, 2007; 978-4-06-283619-7	November 27, 2018; 978-1-947194-32-8
Prologue (序章, Joshō); 1. Triad Shrine (三途神社, Sanzu Jinja); 2. Meisai Tsuruya (敦賀迷彩, Tsuruga Meisai); 3. Kuizame Maniwa (真庭喰鮫, Maniwa Kuizame); 4. The Sentoryu (千刀流, Sentoryū); Epilogue (終章, Shūshō)
04	Book Four: Hakuto the Whisper; Daiyon-wa Hakutō Hari (第四話 薄刀・針)	April 3, 2007; 978-4-06-283623-4	May 28, 2019; 978-1-947194-56-4
Prologue (序章, Joshō); 1. Bug Unit Maniwa (真庭虫組, Maniwa Mushi-gumi); 2. Torture Time (拷問時間, Gōmon Jikan); 3. Watch and Learn (見稽古, Mi Keiko); 4. A Billion Maladies (病魔一億, Byōma Ichi Oku); Epilogue (終章, Shūshō)
05	Book Five: Zokuto the Armor; Daigo-wa Zokutō Yoroi (第五話 賊刀・鎧)	May 8, 2007; 978-4-06-283628-9	May 28, 2019; 978-1-947194-56-4
Prologue (序章, Joshō); 1. The Armored Pirates (鎧海賊団, Yoroi Kaizoku-dan); 2. Kanara Azekura (校倉必, Azekura Kanara); 3. Hohoh Maniwa (真庭鳳凰, Maniwa Hōō); 4. Ryuryoku Kako (柳緑花紅, Ryuryoku Kakō); Epilogue (終章, Shūshō)
06	Book Six: Soto the Twin; Dairoku-wa Sōtō Kanadzuchi (第六話 双刀・鎚)	June 5, 2007; 978-4-06-283631-9	May 28, 2019; 978-1-947194-56-4
Prologue (序章, Joshō); 1. The Absolute Tundra (絶対凍土, Zettai Tōdo); 2. The House of Itezora (凍空一族, Itezora Ichizoku); 3. Princess Negative (否定姫, Hitei Hime); 4. Kyoken Maniwa (真庭狂犬, Maniwa Kyōken); 5. Hika Rakuyo (飛花落葉, Hika Rakuyō); Epilogue (終章, Shūshō)
07	Book Seven: Akuto the Eel; Dainana-wa Akutō Bita (第七話 悪刀・鐚)	July 3, 2007; 978-4-06-283634-0	November 26, 2019; 978-1-947194-91-5
Prologue (序章, Joshō); 1. Gokenji Temple (護剣寺, Gokenji Tera); 2. Emonzaemon Soda (左右田右衛門左衛門, Sōda Emonzaemon); 3. Shichika Hachiretsu (七花八裂); 4. Nanami Yasuri (鑢七実, Yasuri Nanami); 5. Shichika Hachiretsu Redux (七花八裂（改）, Shichika Hachiretsu (Kai)); Epilogue (終章, Shūshō)
08	Book Eight: Bito the Sundial; Daihachi-wa Bitō Kanzashi (第八話 微刀・釵)	August 2, 2007; 978-4-06-283636-4	November 26, 2019; 978-1-947194-91-5
Prologue (序章, Joshō); 1. Schemer Mansion (奇策屋敷, Kisaku Yashiki); 2. Mansion Negative (否定屋敷, Hitei Yashiki); 3. Umigame Maniwa (真庭海亀, Maniwa Umigame); 4. Skytron (日和号, Hiyorigō); 5. Lake Fuyo (不要湖, Fuyō Mizuumi); Epilogue (終章, Shūshō)
09	Book Nine: Oto the Cured; Daikyū-wa Ōtō Nokogiri (第九話 王刀・鋸)	September 4, 2007; 978-4-06-283639-5	November 26, 2019; 978-1-947194-91-5
Prologue (序章, Joshō); 1. The Heartland School (心王一鞘流, Kokoro-ō Ichi Sayaryū); 2. Zanki Kiguchi (汽口慚愧, Kiguchi Zanki); 3. The Follower (門下生, Monkasei); 4. Oshidori Maniwa (真庭鴛鴦, Maniwa Oshidori); 5. Shangri-Oto (王刀楽土, Ōgatana Rakudo); 6. Blind Shogi (目隠将棋, Mekaku Shōgi); Epilogue (終章, Shūshō)
10	Book Ten: Seito the Garland; Daijū-wa Seitō Hakari (第十話 誠刀・銓)	October 2, 2007; 978-4-06-283643-2	August 25, 2020; 978-1-949980-23-3
Prologue (序章, Joshō); 1. Zanki Kiguchi (Reprise) (汽口慚愧（回想）, Kiguchi Zanki (Kaisō)); 2. Hyakkeijo (百刑場, Hyaku Keijō); 3. Pengin Maniwa (真庭人鳥, Maniwa Pengin); 4. Rinne Higaki (彼我木輪廻, Higaki Rinne); 5. Self-Awareness (誠刀防衛, Seitō Bōei); 6. Takahito Hida (飛騨鷹比等, Hida Takahitō); Epilogue (終章, Shūshō)
11	Book Eleven: Dokuto the Basilisk; Daijūichi-wa Dokutō Mekki (第十一話 毒刀・鍍)	November 2, 2007; 978-4-06-283648-7	August 25, 2020; 978-1-949980-23-3
Prologue (序章, Joshō); 1. The Recap (粗筋, Arasuji); 2. Decapitation Cycle (断罪円, Danzai En); 3. The Tokaido Highway (東海道, Tōkaidō); 4. Lucky Pucks (柔球術, Jūkyū-jutsu); 5. Kiki Shikizaki (四季崎記紀, Shikizaki Kiki); Epilogue (終章, Shūshō)
12	Book Twelve: Ento the Bead; Daijūni-wa Entō Jū (第十二話 炎刀・銃)	December 4, 2007; 978-4-06-283652-4	August 25, 2020; 978-1-949980-23-3
Prologue (序章, Joshō); 1. Parting Ways (別離, Betsuri); 2. Masatsuna Yanari (家鳴匡綱, Yanari Masatsuna); 3. Besieging the Castle (城攻, Shiroze); 4. The Eleven Guardians of the Yanari Shogunate (家鳴将軍家御側人十一人衆, Yanari Shōgunke Gogawajin Jūichi-nin Shū); 5. Shichika Yasuri (鑢七花, Yasuri Shichika); Epilogue (終章, Shūshō)
Ex	Maniwagatari: Maniwa Kōmori I, Maniwa Kuizame I, Maniwa Chōchō I, Maniwa Shirasagi I 真庭語 初代真庭蝙蝠 初代真庭喰鮫 初代真庭蝶々 初代真庭白鷺	December 2, 2008; 978-4-06-283687-6	-
1. Shodai Maniwa Koumori (初代 真庭蝙蝠); 2. Shodai Maniwa Kuizame (初代 真庭喰鮫); 3. Shodai Maniwa Chōchō (初代 真庭蝶々); 4. Shodai Maniwa Shirasagi (初代 真庭白鷺)

=== Anime ===
The anime is composed of a dozen 50-minute episodes and follows the two main characters while they are searching for the katanas, except for one episode that is centered on Nanami Yasuri. In each episode, Shichika and Togame collect a katana or a new one will be introduced. The length of the episodes is unusual since most anime have 24-minute episodes and run weekly instead of monthly. A new episode would be released every month, beginning on January 26, 2010, and finishing on December 11, 2010. The series was re-aired on Fuji TV's noitamina from April 11 to June 27, 2013, as the block's first rerun.

For the first half of the series (episodes 1–7), the opening theme is Meiya Kadenrō (冥夜花伝廊) by Minami Kuribayashi while the second half of the series (episode 8–12) is Katana to Saya (刀と鞘) by ALI PROJECT. However, the ending theme changes for each episode. For the noitamina rerun, the new opening theme song was Hakushukassai Utaawase by supercell, and Piko performed the new ending theme song Kotonoha.

No.	Title	Ending theme	Original air date
1	"Plane, the Absolute"; Transliteration: "Zettō・Kanna" (Japanese: 絶刀・鉋)	"Tasogare no Gekka" (誰そ彼の月華) by Yōsei Teikoku	January 25, 2010
The young strategist Togame arrives on Fushou island seeking the head of the Yasuri family who was exiled there many years before. She meets the current head of the family, Yasuri Shichika and his sister Nanami. Togame explains how she is on a journey to find the 12 most powerful swords in Japan which were made by Kiki Shikizaki and needs his help. Shichika has no interest in helping her until Togame commands him to fall in love with her thus giving him a reason. Suddenly, they are attacked by a ninja from the Maniwa Ninja Corps with one of the 12 swords, Zettō Kanna. Shichika defeats the ninja, taking his sword, and they set out on their journey across Japan.
2	"Blunt, the Decapitator"; Transliteration: "Zantō Namakura" (Japanese: 斬刀・鈍)	Refulgence by Shoujobyo	February 8, 2010
When they arrive on the mainland, Shichika finds a strange world full of people and has difficulty on distinguishing one person from another. After a month of travelling, Togame and Shichika reach Inaba in their search for the next sword, Zantō Namakura. Inaba has become an ever-growing sandy desert and they eventually reach the Gekoku castle sinking into the sand. Outside, they stumble across the body of the "reverse-talking" ninja Shirasagi Maniwa who has just been killed by the ronin Uneri Ginkaku. They find Ginkaku living alone in the castle, in a small room with nothing except the sword. After negotiations fail and they witness Ginkaku's challenging speed, Togame and Shichika withdraw to devise a plan. After some deliberation, Shichika challenges Ginkaku again and this time defeats him, earning them the second sword.
3	"Blade, the Thousand"; Transliteration: "Sentō・Tsurugi" (Japanese: 千刀・鎩)	"Senbon Sennyo no Hamari Uta" (千本千女の刃毬唄) by Aki Hata	March 8, 2010
In their third month of travel, the duo arrive at the Sanzu shrine in Izumo Province where the ex-bandit master, the young woman who has taken the name of the former priest Tsuruga Meisai, protects the third sword, Sentō Tsurugi. Before Shichika can fight Meisai for the sword, Togame must find the original sword of the thousand swords distributed among the shrine maidens. The shrine is a refuge for abused women and each carries one of the blades as protection. While Togame searches over the next few days, Shichika bonds with Meisai and learns of her struggle to protect the maidens and Shichika reveals to her that he killed his father. Another ninja from the Maniwa Corps, Kuizame of Sabaku, shows up seeking Sentō Tsurugi. He attacks using his spinning chained blades, Nipou Uzugatana, but meets a quick death at Meisai's hand. The next day, Togame presents Meisai with what she concludes is the oldest sword and Meisai agrees to fight Shichika. Meisai uses the Sentouryū style where you use weapons as they come to hand, but the fight ends with Meisai's death and the third sword in Togame's hands.
4	"Needle, the Fine"; Transliteration: "Hakutō・Hari" (Japanese: 薄刀・針)	"Kyomu no Hana" (虚無の華) by Kukui	April 16, 2010
During the fourth month, Togame and Shichika arrive at a village near Sou in the eastern Yamaguchi prefecture. They seek Hakuhei Sabi, one of Japan’s strongest swordsmen who possesses the thin and frail sword, Hakutō Hari. Sabi sends a challenge to Shichika to meet on Ganryū island and duel for their swords. Meanwhile, Shichika's sister, Nanami, is attacked by the Maniwa Ninja insect squad in an attempted kidnapping. Her foes soon discover that Nanami is actually the more powerful of the Yasuri siblings because of her ability to mimic any technique she sees, and she easily disposes of them. On Ganryū island, Shichika defeats Hakuhei Sabi even though he is apparently much stronger than the other opponents. Shichika and Togame gain their fourth sword although neither Hakuhei nor the fight are ever shown.
5	"Aegis, the Resentment"; Transliteration: "Zokutō・Yoroi" (Japanese: 賊刀・鎧)	"Ai to Makoto" (愛と誠) by Yukari Tamura	May 21, 2010
In their fifth month, the duo encounters the pirate Kanara Azekura who rules the small port of Satsuma. He possesses one of the 12 Deviant Blades, Zokutō Yoroi, which is fashioned into a suit of armour. Because Togame resembles his deceased younger sister, Azekura strikes a deal that if he wins a battle, he takes Togame as his woman. Meanwhile following the loss of 6 of the Maniwa ninja, Hōō, Commander of the Maniwa bird squad offers Togame a truce in the search for the swords in exchange for being able to retain two of them himself and she agrees. Shichika and Azekura begin their contest, and after finding that he cannot penetrate the armour, Shichika defeats Azekura by slamming him into the ground. Following his defeat, Azekura spitefully changes the course of the ship carrying Togame and Shichika from their next destination of Owari Province to the cold northern lands of Ezo.
6	"Hammer, the Dual-Edge"; Transliteration: "Sōtō・Kanazuchi" (Japanese: 双刀・鎚)	"Yuki no Onna" (雪ノ女) by ALI PROJECT	June 4, 2010
Lost and freezing on Mt. Odori in the Ezo region, Togame and Shichika are rescued by an incredibly strong 11 year-old girl named Konayuki Itezora who is the last of the Itezora clan whom she says were all killed in an avalanche. Meanwhile, The remaining members of the Maniwa ninja regroup and prepare to collect Deviant Blades together while avoiding Togame and Shichika, however Kyōken takes off after Togame seeking revenge. At Mt. Odori, Konayuki finds the sixth sword, the incredibly heavy Sōtō Kanazuchi. She follows her clan's instructions of only giving up the sword if defeated in battle. They fight and Shichika's arm is broken by an unexpected blow, the first fight he loses. While Shichika recovers, the vengeful Kyōken Maniwa arrives and uses her power to take over the Konayuki's body and memory. Kyōken suddenly realizes that Konayuki's clan was annihilated. Kyōken then engages Shichika in a fight, but this time Shichika is able to predict the experienced ninja's moves. He defeats Kyōken's spirit, returning Konayuki's control of her own body. Hōō Maniwa arrives with Kawauso and apologises for Kyōken's behavior, and as a sign of good faith, kills Kawauso in front of their eyes. Later, Konayuki gives up the sword and promises to take it to the mainland on her way to live at the Sanzu shrine.
7	"Destitute, the Vile"; Transliteration: "Akutō・Bita" (Japanese: 悪刀・鐚)	"Mayoigo Sagashi" (迷い子さがし) by Mai Nakahara	July 9, 2010
A while ago back on the island, Nanami became annoyed with her brother's slow progress and decided to collect the swords herself. Along the way, she annihilated the Itezora and then traveled to Shireizan where she wiped out the population and took possession of one of the 12 swords, Akutō Bita. Now in the present, Shichika now confronts Nanami at the Seiryouin Gokenji temple on Mt. Sayabashiri, Tosa, watched by Togame and Princess Hitei's servant Sōda Emonzaemon. Nanami is now much stronger after gaining the strength of the Itezora people, thus proving a more powerful opponent than before. She reveals that she has plunged Akutō Bita into her heart magnifying her recuperative abilities. In preparation for a final duel, Togame tells Shichika that he has a flaw in his combination technique and encourages him to vary the sequence of his attacks. Shichika and Nanami meet in the temple for a fight to the death, but just as they start, all of the candles are extinguished in accordance with Togame's plan, leaving them in darkness. Shichika beats Nanami and removes Akutō Bita, however Nanami slices off Togame’s long hair and continues to fight, forcing Shichika to kill her.
8	"Sai, the Minute"; Transliteration: "Bitō・Kanzashi" (Japanese: 微刀・釵)	"Karakuri Nemuridan" (からくり眠り談) by nomico	August 13, 2010
On their way back to Owari, and the duo find the next sword Biyorigō is embedded in a mechanical doll inhabiting an abandoned lake. Meanwhile, Umigame Maniwa encounters Emonzaemon along the way. He reveals that the Maniwa wiped out his ancestors, the Aioi ninja corps, and summarily kills Umigame. Togame gathers information and attempts to capture the mechanical doll by setting a trap which fails so she has Shichika trick it into revealing all of its techniques by carrying out a series of attacks. Shichika eventually fights the mechanical doll but he blocks and dodges all of its attacks and until it runs out of energy and Shichika swoops in to capture it. Later, Togame sends the doll off to Princess Hitei without its blades while they remain there to find Shikizaki's workshop.
9	"Saw, the Imperator"; Transliteration: "Ōtō Nokogiri" (Japanese: 王刀・鋸)	"Akashi" (証) by Annabel	September 10, 2010
Togame and Shichika now meet Zanki Kiguchi, owner of the Shinō Issō dojo and the ninth sword, Ōtō Nokogiri. Togame and Kiguchi play shōgi for Nokogiri but Kiguchi loses so she must fight Shichika with bamboo swords. Shichika loses badly since his family's inheritance simply prevents him from wielding swords, so Kiguchi decides to teach him the art of kendo. Meanwhile the three remaining Maniwa find the sword Dokutō Mekki in a cavern. Back at the dojo, Shichika proves clumsy and causes many compromising situations which makes Togame immensely jealous. Meanwhile, Princess Hitei commands her servant Sōda Emonzaemon to assassinate Hōō Maniwa. He finds the remaining Maniwa Ninja Corps, Hōō, Pengin and Oshidori, but Hōō and Pengin escape leaving Oshidori to face Emonzaemon alone. After a hard-fought battle Emonzaemon shoots her dead with his pair of pistols. Back at the Shinō Issō dojo, Togame kisses Shichika causing him to forget his kendo training. When Shichika finally faces Kiguchi, Togame distracts her with shōgi moves during the match. After Shichika beats Kiguchi by a using a completely unpredictable move, she hands over the Ōtō Nokogiri.
10	"Scales, the Sincere"; Transliteration: "Seitō・Hakari" (Japanese: 誠刀・銓)	"Ina, to Hime wa Subete o Katarazu" (否、と姫は全てを語らず) by Haruka Tomatsu	October 15, 2010
Togame and Shichika arrive in Togame's deserted homeland of Hyakkeijō in Ōshū where the meet the holy man Rinne Higaki. He appears to Shichika in the form of a young girl whereas Togame sees him as her father. Higaki tells Togame he buried the sword Seitō Hakari 30 meters under the ground and she begins digging furiously. Higaki causes Shichika and Togame to face uncomfortable memories from their past: Shichika sees those who defeated him, and the death of his sister while Togame sees her father murdered by Mutsue Yasuri. The two remaining Maniwa Ninja, Hōō and Pengin head for Ōshū with the sword Dokutō Mekki while Princess Hitei sends Emonzaemon to find out Togame's real identity. Higaki transports Shichika into an illusionary world where they begin fighting, but Higaki easily avoids Shichika's attacks and poses questions to make Shichika consider his real reason for fighting. Shichika and runs back to Togame who realizes Higaki's intentions and she is rewarded with the memory of her father's dying words. She easily retrieves Seitō Hakari which has no blade. Later, Rinne reveals that the Kyotōryū technique of using no physical sword was actually Kiki Shikizaki's complete and final technique and Shichika is its vehicle. Leaving with Seitō Hakari, they head for Owari but find Pengin Maniwa in a critical condition and he asks them to save Hōō.
11	"Gilt, the Venomous"; Transliteration: "Dokutō Mekki" (Japanese: 毒刀・鍍)	"Bōrei-tachi yo Yabō no Hate ni Nemure" (亡霊達よ野望の果てに眠れ) by Faylan	November 12, 2010
In a flashback to the Sengoku period hundreds of years earlier, Kiki Shikizaki offers to help Yasuri Kazune improve his swordsmanship. In the present, Togame and Shichika now have ten of the Deviant Blades and Princess Hitei learns Togame's true identity as the daughter of Takahito Hida. A little while earlier, Emonzaemon found Hōō and Pengin, and engaged Hōō in hand to hand combat. As Pengin looked on, he threw Hōō the eleventh sword, Dokutō Mekki, which gave Hōō the power to wound Emonzaemon but influenced by the sword he cut down Pengin. When Togame and Shichika find the bleeding Pengin they take him to an inn. They deduce that he had been cut by Dokutō Mekki and decide to follow Hōō towards Maniwa village in search of the sword. Togame proposes that they create the first complete map of Japan following their extensive travels and confides that she has come to rely on Shichika as her trusted partner. Back at the inn, Emonzaemon appears with the last sword, the two pistols Entō Jū, and although the bullets he fires are initially countered by Pengin's special abilities, Emonzaemon fatally shoots Pengin at close range. In the abandoned village of Iga, Shichika and Togame find Hōō holding Dokutō Mekki. He has been possessed by Shikizaki's spirit which reveals his plan to change history. Shichika attacks Shikizaki, but the fight ends quickly with Shichika as the winner. Finally arriving above Owari at sunset, Togame and Shichika are confronted by Emonzaemon who reveals that he knows Togame's true identity. Shocked, they both freeze as Emonzaemon pulls out Entō Jū and shoots Togame.
12	"Gun, the Firearm"; Transliteration: "Entō Jū" (Japanese: 炎刀・銃)	"Toki Sude ni Hajimari o Kizamu" (時すでに始まりを刻む) by Minami Kuribayashi	December 10, 2010
After fatally shooting Togame, Emonzaemon explains that she has fulfilled her mission for the shogunate and walks away. Shichika holds Togame as she bleeds to death who tells Shichika that she exploited him for her own ends. She orders him to forget about her, which he refuses to do and she confesses that she enjoyed being with him, and that he changed her. With her last words she asks if it was okay if she fell for him too. At the Shogun's castle, Princess Hitei is revealed to be Kiki Shikizaki's descendant when she meets the Owari Shogun, Masatsuna Yinari. She tells him of Shikizaki's prediction that the country would fall in a hundred years. Emonzaemon intervenes to say that the Kyotōryū has entered the castle. The guards are unable to stop Shichika so the Shogun sends Emonzaemon and his eleven retainers armed with Shikizaki's Deviant Blades, to deal with him. Shichika enters the building, breaking the blades and killing the swordsmen as he moves up each floor, effectively using the fighting experience he developed while travelling with Togame. He finally faces Emonzaemon and reveals that he came prepared to die. He manages to kill Emonzaemon even though he is badly injured himself. When Shichika arrives at the final room, Hitei tells the Shogun that Shikizaki's original plan was the collapse of the Owari Shogunate. Shichika spares her and kills the Shogun who sent Togame on the suicidal mission of collecting the swords. In an epilogue, Shichika travels with Hitei as they form a partnership of convenience on his journey to map the entirety of Japan.

=== Drama CD ===
A Drama CD in twelve chapters, titled Episode 0: Kyotō Yasuri and written by Nisio Isin, was released with the DVD/BDs of the series. It is set during the rebellion twenty years before the events of the series. Each chapter has a character from the series narrating the episode.

- Chapter 1
  - Read by Togame (VA: Yukari Tamura)
- Chapter 2
  - Read by Uneri Ginkaku (VA: Mitsuru Miyamoto)
- Chapter 3
  - Read by Tsuruga Meisai (VA: Atsuko Yuya)
- Chapter 4
  - Read by Sabi Hakuhei (VA: Hikaru Midorikawa)
- Chapter 5
  - Read by Kanara Azekura (VA: Tsuyoshi Koyama)
- Chapter 6
  - Read by Princess Hitei (VA: Tomatsu Haruka)
- Chapter 7
  - Read by Nanami Yasuri (VA: Mai Nakahara)
- Chapter 8
  - Read by Emonzaemon Sōda (VA: Rikiya Koyama)
- Chapter 9
  - Read by Kiguchi Zanki (VA: Shizuka Itō)
- Chapter 10
  - Read by Rinne Higaki (VA: Miyako Itō)
- Chapter 11
  - Read by Hōō Maniwa (VA: Ryōtarō Okiayu)
- Chapter 12
  - Read by Shichika Yasuri (VA: Yoshimasa Hosoya)

== Reception ==
In 2019, Polygon named Katanagatari as one of the best anime of the 2010s.
