= Leviathan: The Last Defense =

Japanese mobile game

- Game title screen

絶対防衛レヴィアタン (Zettai Bōei Reviatan)
- Genre: Fantasy, magical girl
- Video game
- Genre: Role-playing game, Collectible card game, Social network game, Fantasy
- Platform: iOS, Android
- Released: iOS: April 4, 2013; Android: April 8, 2013
- Anime television series

Zettai Bōei Leviatan
- Directed by: Kenichi Yatani
- Written by: Go Zappa; Yasunori Ide
- Music by: Tomoki Kikuya; Shiho Terada
- Studio: Gonzo; GREE; Dentsu
- Licensed by: Crunchyroll (Note: In North America through Crunchyroll, LLC (formerly known as Funimation).)
- Original network: TXN (TV Tokyo), AT-X
- Original run: April 6, 2013 – July 7, 2013
- Episodes: 13

Leviathan: The Last Defense (絶対防衛レヴィアタン, Zettai Bōei Reviatan; lit. 'Absolute Defense Leviathan') is a Japanese mobile game by GREE. The plot features anthropomorphized dragons as characters. It is a freemium game, as the base game is free of charge but game add-ons can be downloaded for various prices. The game was announced in October 2012 and users who preregistered got a rare card.

An anime adaptation by Gonzo aired in Japan from April to July 2013.

== Characters ==
Leviathan (レヴィアタン, Reviatan)
Voiced by: Saori Hayami (Japanese); Caitlynn French (English)
Leviathan is a water mage from the land of Aquafall who makes friends with Bahamut and Jörmungandr while searching for her older brother. She lives in a humble cottage by herself and can transform into a water-affinity dragon girl.
Bahamut (バハムート, Bahamūto)
Voiced by: Eri Kitamura (Japanese); Hilary Haag (English)
Bahamut is a fire mage and daughter of the city's leader. She lives in a huge mansion, along with her father and personal maids. She can transform into a fire-affinity dragon girl.
Jörmungandr (ヨルムンガンド, Yorumungando)
Voiced by: Ayana Taketatsu (Japanese); Brittney Karbowski (English)
Jörmungandr doesn't have any elemental magic abilities, but is by far the physically strongest girl of the trio, capable of lifting huge boulders by herself - likely through strength boosting magic and can transform into an earth-affinity dragon girl brandishing a huge axe. She was adopted along with her 3 younger sisters by a team of miners and they call each one of them their fathers.
Syrup (シロップ, Shiroppu)
Voiced by: Kana Hanazawa (Japanese); Monica Rial (English)
Syrup is a fairy who befriends the girls and usually tries to recruit them into the "Aquafall Defense Squad", that she intends to establish to fight back the Toripu. Despite being small, she has quite an appetite, capable of eating several times her own weight in one meal and is very honest, to the point of bluntness that usually gets her into trouble.
Yurlungur (ユルルングル, Yururunguru)
Yurlungur is a large dragon who appears in episode 3, and uses Syrup to translate what he is saying to the girls. He tells them he isn't feeling well. They help him by going inside of his body and defeating a giant Toripu that was making him feel ill. He then thanks the girls and tells them that they can call him anytime they are in trouble.

== Media ==
=== Anime ===
An anime series directed by Kenichi Yatani and produced by Gonzo, GREE, and Dentsu aired from April 6 to July 7, 2013. The series uses two pieces of theme music. The opening theme is "Hajimari no Resolution" (始まりのResolution) by Yuki Kanno while them ending theme is "Truly" by PASSPO☆. Crunchyroll streamed the series under the title Zettai Boei Leviatan, while was licensed for home video and digital distribution by Sentai Filmworks. After Sentai Filmworks lost the rights to the series, it was re-licensed by Funimation.

==== Episode list ====
No.	Title	Original release date
1	"I'll Definitely Make You My Friend!"; Transliteration: "Zettai Nakama Ni Suru Mon!" (Japanese: 絶対仲間にするもん!)	April 6, 2013
A group of meteorites descend on the planet Aquafall, housing evil creatures intent on destroying the world. A girl from the dragon clan rises up to the challenge.
2	"You'll Definitely Get Stuck!"; Transliteration: "Zettai Hamacchau Mon!" (Japanese: 絶対ハマッちゃうもん!)	April 13, 2013
Syrup wants Bahamut to join the Aquafall Defense team, but she has other things to think about.
3	"I'll Definitely Go Deep!"; Transliteration: "Zettai Oku Made Icchau Mon!" (Japanese: 絶対奥までイッちゃうもん!)	April 20, 2013
Now free from the clutches of the swamp, the trio sets out to save friend.
4	"I'll Definitely Call You!"; Transliteration: "Zettai Yonjau Mon!" (Japanese: 絶対呼んじゃうもん!)	April 27, 2013
When a cave-in at the mines traps Jörmungandr's fathers behind layers of rocks and debris, the girls come to the rescue.
5	"I'm Going on Vacation!"; Transliteration: "Zettai Bakansu Da Mon!" (Japanese: 絶対バカンスなんだもん!)	May 4, 2013
It's time to head to the beach! Bahamut and Jormumgand make their way to the sandy beaches while Leviathan joins them to find more clues about her brother.
6	"I'll Have My Revenge!"; Transliteration: "Zettai Kataki wo Torunda Mon!" (Japanese: 絶対仇を取るんだもん!)	May 11, 2013
While at the beach, the girls stumble upon the root of the problem facing their world, an enormous Lucasite! As it starts releasing waves of Toripu, Leviathan and her friends must transform and fight.
7	"I'll Definitely Find It!"; Transliteration: "Zettai Mitsukaru Mon!" (Japanese: 絶対見つかるもん!)	May 18, 2013
The three girls, along with Syrup, trek across the desert in search of the fleeing Lucasite. After a fruitless attempt to produce water, Bahamut decides that she's had enough.
8	"It's Definitely Suspicious!"; Transliteration: "Zettai Ayashii Mon!" (Japanese: 絶対怪しいもん!)	May 25, 2013
Leviathan is wounded by a Lucasite attack. With her friends fighting to defend her and Toripu spawning at a fantastic rate, there seems to be no end in sight.
9	"I'm Definitely Going to Take a Bath!"; Transliteration: "Zettai Ofuro Ni Hairunda Mon!" (Japanese: 絶対お風呂に入るんだもん!)	June 1, 2013
Coming to Rajima Volcano to heal their wounds, Leviathan and her friends decide to spend the night at an inn.
10	"I'll Definitely Cheer You Up!"; Transliteration: "Zettai Genki Ni Shichau Mon!" (Japanese: 絶対元気にしちゃうもん!)	June 8, 2013
Leviathan and her friends run into a weakened Fire Drake on their way to the hot springs. He will need medicine to pull through.
11	"I'll Definitely Revive You!"; Transliteration: "Zettai Fukkasaseru Mon!" (Japanese: 絶対復活させるもん!)	June 15, 2013
Leviathan and her friends discover a group of Toripu while returning from Rajima Volcano. Meanwhile, the Lucasite assault the barrier, which seems on the verge of breaking.
12	"It's Definitely a Shock!"; Transliteration: "Zettai Shokkuda Mon!" (Japanese: 絶対ショックだもん!)	June 22, 2013
Finally returning to their village, Leviathan and friends want rest, but they are asked once again to join the Aquafall Defense team.
13	"I'll Definitely Defend It!"; Transliteration: "Zettai Bouei Shichaumon!" (Japanese: 絶対防衛しちゃうもん!)	July 7, 2013
Lucasite returns to Leviathan's village, and Leviathan sets out to fight.

== Reception ==
Carl Kimlinger of Anime News Network gave the series an overall C+ rating. He gave credit to both director Kenichi Yatani and the character designs of Takaharu Okuma for crafting a light-hearted adventure with an "intensely cute" female cast that delivers a "pleasing dry sense of humor" but found it throwaway with its ongoing story using "musty RPG plotting" and its overall charm being a detriment to itself, saying "That frothiness is both Leviathan's great strength and its ultimate weakness. It's effortlessly fun to watch, but also about as memorable as, well, something that I can't quite remember right now." Stig Høgset, writing for THEM Anime Reviews, heavily criticized the series for being a poor adaptation of a fantasy RPG game that puts an overreliance on moe designs and fanservice, while the overall plot and characters get little development to engage viewers, concluding that its "A failure in every single aspect of what makes a show good, and I've seen a lot of relatively average fantasy anime that at least managed to be entertaining."
