= Hoshizora e Kakaru Hashi =

Japanese visual novel, manga series and anime series

- Hoshizora e Kakaru Hashi game cover art featuring all main heroines ordered from top to left: Koyori Toudou, Tsumugi Toudou, Ui Nakatsugawa (front) Madoka Kōmoto, Ibuki Hinata and Hina Sakai.

星空へ架かる橋
- Genre: Harem, Romance
- Video game
- Developer: Feng
- Genre: Visual novel, Eroge
- Platform: Windows
- Released: October 15, 2010
- Anime television series
- Directed by: Takenori Mihara
- Produced by: Hajime Kamada; Makoto Itō; Takema Okamura; Yūichirō Takahata; Uesama
- Written by: Gō Zappa
- Music by: Atsushi Umebori; Funta (#1–2)
- Studio: Doga Kobo
- Original network: AT-X, Chiba TV, Sun TV, Tokyo MX, TV Aichi, TVS
- Original run: April 11, 2011 – June 27, 2011
- Episodes: 12 + OVA
- Manga
- Written by: Feng
- Illustrated by: Kurumi Morisaki
- Published by: Kadokawa Shoten
- Magazine: Comp Ace
- Original run: June 2011 – February 2012
- Volumes: 2
- icon

Hoshizora e Kakaru Hashi (星空へ架かる橋), sometimes shortened to Hoshikaka and also known by the translation A Bridge to the Starry Skies, is a Japanese adult visual novel developed and published by Feng, released on October 15, 2010, for Windows. The story, a mostly comedic slice-of-life, centers on Kazuma Hoshino, an adolescent boy who moves into rural Japan with his brother, and the personal and romantic encounters he has with a handful of the female residents there. Though the game requires little interaction from users, Hoshikaka engages the player through a nonlinear plot that they are given opportunities to change the course of during play.

Feng announced work on Hoshizora e Kakaru Hashi in May 2009 and marketed it through public venues and the broadcast of a radio drama throughout development. The game was postponed a total of nine times and released almost a year after its initial date but was met with relatively positive reception. On November 11, 2011, Feng announced work on a fan disc for the game, set to be released on February 24, 2012.

Following the game's release, Hoshizora e Kakaru Hashi made transitions into other media. Two volumes of a manga were published, as was an art book, audio dramas and several albums of music. A twelve-episode animated television series and direct-to-video (OVA) single release was also produced by Doga Kobo.

== Gameplay ==
Example of a scene in Hoshizora e Kakaru Hashi. Here, Kazuma talks to Ui and Ibuki.

As a visual novel, Hoshizora e Kakaru Hashi contains extremely minimal gameplay. The game is presented in a traditional fashion, with static backgrounds and moderately altered character poses viewed from a mostly first-person perspective. At predetermined intervals, the game stops, and players are presented with one to two responses or actions relevant to the scene in progress to make, or not make, on behalf of characters. Each selection branches the game's progress up to that point in an alternate direction, while also causing the player's love toward a character to blossom, plateau, or diminish, thus providing for a nonlinear storytelling experience. Being an erotic title, relationships between characters may expectedly become sexual; scenes of this kind depict a varying combination of groping, oral sex and intercourse.

== Plot ==
Kazuma Hoshino is a high school student who, along with his younger brother, Ayumu, moves from an undisclosed city in Japan to the rural town of Yamabiko on account of Ayumu's asthma. While settling into their new surroundings the brothers become acquainted with several locals including Ui Nakatsugawa, Ibuki Hinata, the Toudou sisters Tsumugi and Koyori, Madoka Koumoto and Hina Sakai among others. The story details the brothers' adventures with their new friends.

== Characters ==
Hoshizora e Kakaru Hashi follows the life of Kazuma Hoshino, a teenage boy who moves to the fictional rural town of Yamabiko with his younger brother, Ayumu, on account of Ayumu's asthma. Kazuma loses his way in the forest after chasing a monkey that stole Ayumu's hat and meets Ui Nakatsugawa, a cute and cheerful, if airheaded, schoolgirl whom he takes an almost immediate liking to. As they make their way back to where Ayumu is waiting, Kazuma learns that Ui is fond of cooking, has a refined sense of taste, sports a nearly insatiable appetite, and by extension, loves eating. During their walk through the forest Kazuma also becomes acquainted with Ibuki Hinata, Ui's temperamental spitfire of a best friend. In spite of his admirable efforts to make up for his faux pas, Ibuki does not hold a high opinion of Kazuma until much later when his genuinely positive and friendly qualities lead to her developing feelings for him.

After returning to Yamabiko, Kazuma and Ayumu become acquainted with a number of other people. Senka Yorozu is a friend of their father's and the landlady of Yorozuyo Inn where they stay. She is a gregarious woman, with a penchant for drinking. On the way to school the next day they meet Tsumugi Toudou, a down-home, third-year senior, who familiarizes the boys with the town and its culture. At school Kazuma becomes friends with Daigo Minamikokubaru, a classmate with a fondness for online games and always imagining nude girls. He is also the son of their homeroom teacher. Kazuma later meets Hina Sakai, a tall and quiet girl with a fondness for anything cute.

On their way back from campus, Kazuma and the group wait for Ayumu to join them from his middle school. Ayumu arrives in the company of Kasane Toudou, Tsumugi's youngest sister, a sweet-natured, blue-haired girl known around the town for her interest in gossip. In touring the community, everyone makes their way to the local Shinto shrine, where the miko and daughter of the priest, Madoka Komoto, is introduced to the boys. Much to their surprise, Madoka runs off in a panic at the sight of Kazuma, something that happened again at school the next day. He returns to the shrine the following afternoon to see her again but is interrupted by Koyori Toudou, the middle Toudou sister (younger than Tsumugi and older than Kasane). With a similar personality to Ibuki (loud and brash), Koyori similarly does not welcome Kazuma until his kindness shows through, such as when he breaks her fall from a tree.

== Development and release ==
According to D-Dream, a distributor of visual novels and domestic anime products, Hoshizora e Kakaru Hashi was officially announced by Feng on May 8, 2009. The official website had also gone live around this time, and from September 28 to November 16, character profiles, sample artwork, and voice clips were added.

On November 26, 2009, D-Dream reported that Hoshikaka had been postponed from its original release date on December 11, 2009, to February 26, 2010. In the following month, on December 18, Feng announced that it would be attending the Akihabara Electric Festival on December 27 at the Akihabara Sofmap Amusement Hall to promote the game, selling phonecards and dakimakura cases. From December 25, 2009, to February 4, 2010, Feng remained relatively quiet about the game's development, until on February 5 it was announced that the game had been postponed from February 26 to April 23. More artwork samples were added from March 5 to 12, and on April 13, the game was postponed for a third time from April 23 to May 28. On April 30, after adding more sample artwork, Feng announced that it would be attending Dream Party 2010, an anime convention, on May 23 at Tokyo Big Sight in Ariake, selling dakimakura cases and T-shirts. After adding more sample art on March 7, the company postponed the game for a fourth time on March 14, from May 28 to June 25.

More art and voice samples were added from May 28 to June 11, with a fifth postponement on June 16 from June 25 to July 30. On June 24, the company announced that it would be distributing free Hoshikaka posters the following day at the Sofmap retail establishment in Chiyoda. The shortened version of the game's ending theme "Hiroga ru Yozora no Shita de" was published on July 2, and on July 16 the game's opening movie was released along with a sixth postponement from July 30 to August 27. A week later on July 24, Feng posted the game's first collection of purchasable merchandise. The company announced days later on July 30 that it would be attending Comiket 78 at Tokyo Big Site from August 13 to 15, selling dakimakura cases, wall scrolls, keyboard covers, cellphone screen wipes, bath salts, hand fans, towels and air fresheners.

On August 12, 2010, Feng released a public trial of Hoshikaka. The game was postponed for a seventh time on August 19 from August 27 to September 24. A second trial was released on September 10, followed shortly by an eighth postponement on September 14 from September 24 to September 30. This date change was then followed by a ninth postponement on September 22, when it was changed from September 30 to October 15. In the following week, Feng announced that it would be attending the Dream Party Autumn 2010 at Tokyo Big Sight on October 3, selling dakimakura cases. With the absence of a tenth postponement, Feng announced on October 8 that it would be hosting a celebratory event for the game's release on October 15 at Sofmap retailers in Akihabara, holding a raffle and autographing copies of the game. A third trial was released on October 10, and on October 15, the game was released.

On the day of release, Feng published a patch for Hoshikaka, adding additional functionality to the game and crushing numerous bugs, bringing the game to version 1.01. The following year on February 15, 2011, Feng released a free, downloadable expansion to the game called the St. Valentine's Day Patch, which added extra routes for Ui and Hina. Feng announced Hoshizora e Kakaru Hashi AA, a fan disc, on November 11, 2011, set for release February 24, 2012. Getchu.com ranked AA in their 50 most reserved games for its time of recently announced titles.

== Media ==
=== Print media ===
A 128-page art book, titled "Hoshizora e Kakaru Hashi Visual Fan Book", was published by ASCII Media Works on March 30, 2011, containing character illustrations and staff interviews and commentaries. A manga adaptation, illustrated by Kurumi Morisaki, was serialized in the seinen manga magazine Comp Ace between its June 2011 and February 2012 issues. Retelling the story of the original game, the first tankōbon volume was published by Kadokawa Shoten July 26, 2011. A second volume followed, published December 26.

=== Anime ===
Hoshizora e Kakaru Hashi was notably adapted into a twelve-episode anime television series by Doga Kobo. News of this first appeared on December 29, 2010, when Doga Kobo announced via their blog that information about the show had been posted on its then-new website. Stations participating in the broadcast included Chiba TV, Tokyo MX, TV Aichi, Sun TV, TV Saitama, and AT-X, the premiere of which would air on AT-X on April 4. From July 6 to December 7, 2011, Hoshizora e Kakaru Hashi was published into six DVDs and Blu-rays containing two episodes each. The anime was streamed in western countries with English subtitles by Crunchyroll, along with other titles such as The World God Only Knows and Deadman Wonderland.

Doga Kobo also produced one direct-to-video (OVA) episode of Hoshikaka. News of it was posted on August 12, 2011, mentioning that a new character would be voiced by singer-songwriter Yukari Tamura. Updates were added from September 5 to November 28, and on December 21, the episode was released as a limited and regular edition DVD and Blu-ray.

=== Audio CDs ===
Hoshizora e Kakaru Hashi Original Soundtrack

From 2010 to 2011, five albums of Hoshikaka music were published. The "Hoshizora e Kakaru Hashi Opening Theme" single, containing the game's opening theme of the same name, the closing theme Hirogaru Yozora no Shita de (広がる夜空の下で), performed by Nomico and Ringo Aoba, and their instrumentals, was the first to be distributed on December 29, 2010, at Comiket 79, published under Feng's own label.

The following year, Pony Canyon published four albums. The singles "Hoshikaze no Horoscope" (星風のホロスコープ, Hoshikaze no Horosukopu), a four-track disc performed by Nomico, and "Dashed Cinderella" (だっしゅどシンデレラ, Dasshudo Shinderera), another four-track featuring the voices of Eriko Nakamura and Ai Shimizu, the voice actresses for Ui and Madoka, were released on May 27, 2011. A month later, on June 27, the company released the game's original soundtrack, and on August 3, the "Hoshizora e Kakaru Hashi Character Song Album", an eight-track album featuring music performed by the anime's voice actresses was released.

=== Internet radio shows ===
Two internet radio shows have been produced based on Hoshizora e Kakaru Hashi. The first of these, a radio drama called Hoshizora e Kakaru Hashi Radio, was streamed on a Japanese internet radio network called Onsen during the visual novel's development, and was broadcast every Friday between October 16, 2009, and November 26, 2010. Ichigo Momoi and Kaname Yuzuki, who voiced Senka and Koyori in the visual novel, respectively, hosted the show. A total of fifty seven broadcasts were made. It was also published into two albums, released October 3, 2011.

A second internet radio show, called Radio Hoshizora e Kakaru Hashi "Yorozu Yo Bekkan", was hosted by Shiho Kawaragi and Aiko Okubo, who voice Senka and Koyori in the anime, respectively. It was broadcast every Friday on Onsen, between April 1 and August 26, 2011. A total of twenty two broadcasts were made. The radio show was used to promote the anime adaptation of Hoshizora e Kakaru Hashi.

== Reception ==
Getchu.com, a major distributor of visual novels and domestic anime products, ranked Hoshizora e Kakaru Hashi as the number one visual novel sold for the month of its release, but failed to chart any further. It was, however, ranked as the third most sold game for the entire year on Getchu.com. Hoshizora e Kakaru Hashi won a silver prize for character design at Moe Game Awards in 2011.

The Hoshizora e Kakaru Hashi anime was reviewed by Aiden Foote of THEM Anime Reviews, where he panned the series for having "cliché" and "terrible" characters, and a "generic" plot. However, on the contrary, the first episode was reviewed by Chris Beveridge at Mania.com, where he praised the anime's "natural flow", and "appealing" production quality. The Hoshizora e Kakaru Hashi DVD sold 589 copies between July 4 and July 10, 2011, in Japan, and the blu-ray release sold 917 copies during the same period.
