= Mistonia's Hope: The Lost Delight =

2024 video game

ミストニアの翅望 -The Lost Delight- (Misutonia no Kibō -The Lost Delight-)
- Genre: Otome, Romance, Dark fantasy
- Video game

Mistonia's Hope -The Lost Delight-
- Developer: Idea Factory
- Publisher: JP: Otomate; WW: Aksys Games
- Genre: Visual novel
- Platform: Nintendo Switch, Nintendo Switch Lite
- Released: JP: July 18, 2024; WW: November 13, 2025

Mistonia's Hope: The Lost Delight (ミストニアの翅望 -The Lost Delight-, Misutonia no Kibō -The Lost Delight-) is a Japanese otome game developed by Idea Factory and published under their Otomate brand.

== Plot ==
In the remote village of Eltbeak, in the Kingdom of Grand Albion, Aprose E. Randolph's family was massacred by a royal decree by the Fairy Queen Tia, leaving her the sole survivor. Eight years later, after harbouring an intense amount of grief, Aprose returns to Grand Albion under the pseudonym Rose Cottingley, infiltrating the noble House Bernstein as a maid, determined to get revenge against the Queen and all five noble houses (Bernstein, Creswell, Ward, Sullivan, and Lindel).

== Characters ==
=== Main Characters ===
Aprose E. Randolph (アプローズ＝E＝ランドルフ, Apurōzu E randorufu)
The protagonist who adopts the pseudonym Rose Cottingley (ローズ＝コティングリー, Rōzu kotingurī)
Edward Bernstein (エドワード＝バーンスタイン, Edowādo Bāsutain)
Voiced by Atsushi Tamaru

Alfred Creswell (アルフレッド＝クレスウェル, Arufureddo Kuresuweru)
Voiced by Yuichiro Umehara

Linus Ward (ライナス＝ウォード, Rainasu Wōdo)
Voiced by Shuichiro Umeda

Lucas Sullivan (ルーカス＝サリヴァン, Rūkasu Sarivan)
Voiced by Ryota Suzuki

Ascot Lindel (アスコット＝リンデル, Asukotto Rinderu)
Voiced by Jun Fukuyama

John (ジョン, Jon)
Voiced by Yusuke Shirai

=== Secondary Characters ===
The Fairy Queen Tia (妖精女王・ティア, Yōsei Joō Tia)
Voiced by Saki Fujita

Fairy King Oberon (妖精王・オベロン, Yōsei Ō Oberon)
Voiced by Natsumi Fujiwara

Edmund Bernstein (エドマンド＝バーンスタイン, Edomando Bāsutain)
Voiced by Kenji Nomura

Lilly Bernstein (リリー＝バーンスタイン, Rirī Bāsutain)
Voiced by Ikumi Hasegawa

Nicholas Henderson (ニコラス＝ヘンダーソン, Nikorasu Hendāson)
Voiced by Ken Uo

Philip Ortiz (フィリップ＝オルティス, Firippu Orutisu)
Voiced by Kenta Tanaka

Evelyn Miller (エブリン＝ミラー, Eburin Mirā)
Voiced by Mirei Kumagai

Charlotte Perez (シャルロッテ＝ペレス, Sharurotte Peresu)
Voiced by Miho Ishigami

Riley Randolph (ライリー＝ランドルフ, Rairī Randorufu)
Voiced by Eiji Takeuchi

Leonardo (レオナルド, Reonarudo)
Voiced by Tomo Murakami

Goneril (ゴネリル, Goneriru)
Voiced by Naomi Iida

== Game ==
The game was originally announced on September 10, 2023, at the Otomate Party 2023. On November 20, 2023, the game's official website was launched. On November 27, the opening theme video was released, featuring the song a flavour of the moment sung by FRAM. The games ending song, WHITE AUBE, was performed by Asaka. On February 13, 2024, a character preview was released for the game. On May 20, 2024, the first set of preview gameplay videos were released by Idea Factory. The game was originally intended to be released on July 6, 2024, however on April 4, it was announced the date was postponed for quality improvements. The game was released on July 18, 2024, for the Nintendo Switch with a CERO D age rating (aged 17 or older).

In July 2025, Aksys Games announced that they would release the game in English. The game was released in English on November 13, 2025.

== Reception ==
Famitsu reported that from July 15, 2024 to July 21, 2024, the game ranked 9th place in physical purchases with 5,276 units sold.

Jenni Lada from Siliconera found the game to be "great", enjoying the mix of revenge and romance, praising the heroine's "identity and personality, compared to other otome titles", the art, she also found the betrayal mechanic (where the heroine leaves the chosen love interest for his rival) to be fun, and the mystery. However, she also commented how some of the romance felt "forced" in certain scenes, she also wrote regarding Alfred's route that "the romance in that one sort of feels like more of an aside than being well-integrated into events."

Reception

Review score
Publication	Score
RPGFan	87/100

Audra Bowling from RPGFan called Aprose "one of the most fleshed-out and well-developed" protagonist she had ever encountered, enjoying her growth. She found John's route to be the strongest, while also praising Edward, Linus, and Lucas' route, however, she criticized Alfred and Ascot's routes, finding the romance to have developed too quickly. She also found the art to be "gorgeous", while also enjoying the opening theme.
