= Shūichirō Umeda =

Japanese voice actor (born 1995)

- 梅田 修一朗
- Born: October 11, 1995 (age 31); Chiba Prefecture, Japan
- Occupation: Voice actor
- Years active: 2018–present
- Agent: Ken Production
- Notable work: The Dawn of the Witch as Saybil; Shikimori's Not Just a Cutie as Yuuki Izumi; My Life as Inukai-san's Dog as Pochita; Why Raeliana Ended Up at the Duke's Mansion as Adam Taylor; Zom 100: Bucket List of the Dead as Akira Tendo; Studio Apartment, Good Lighting, Angel Included as Shintarō Tokumitsu; Too Many Losing Heroines! as Kazuhiko Nukumizu; My Hero Academia: Vigilantes as Koichi Haimawari; The Summer Hikaru Died as Hikaru Indō

Shūichirō Umeda (梅田 修一朗, Umeda Shūichirō; born October 11, 1995) is a Japanese voice actor affiliated with Ken Production. Some of his notable roles include Saybil in The Dawn of the Witch, Yuuki Izumi in Shikimori's Not Just a Cutie, Akira Tendo in Zom 100: Bucket List of the Dead, Kazuhiko Nukumizu in Too Many Losing Heroines!, Koichi Haimawari in My Hero Academia: Vigilantes, and Hikaru Indō in The Summer Hikaru Died. He won the Best New Actor Award at the 17th Seiyu Awards.

== Career ==
Umeda was inspired to become a voice actor after seeing voice actress Rie Suegara at the Tokyo Game Show. He decided to enroll at School Duo, the training school Suegara graduated from. He completed his training at School Duo in 2018 and became affiliated with Ken Production that year. In 2022, he appeared as Saybil in the anime series The Dawn of the Witch and Yuuki Izumi in Shikimori's Not Just a Cutie. In 2023, he appeared as Pochita in My Life as Inukai-san's Dog. Later that year, he was a recipient of the Best New Actor Award at the 17th Seiyu Awards. In 2024, he voiced Shintarō Tokumitsu in Studio Apartment, Good Lighting, Angel Included and Kazuhiko Nukumizu in Too Many Losing Heroines!. In 2025, Umeda voiced the title character Hikaru Indō in The Summer Hikaru Died.

== Filmography ==
=== Anime series ===
2018

- Banana Fish as Fellow

2019

- Chihayafuru 3 as Attendant

2021

- Mazica Party as Student, wizard
- The World Ends with You: The Animation as Makoto
- Tropical-Rouge! Pretty Cure as Horticulture club member
- The Aquatope on White Sand as Guest

2022

- The Dawn of the Witch as Saybil
- Shikimori's Not Just a Cutie as Yuuki Izumi
- Utawarerumono: Mask of Truth as Ravie
- Megaton Musashi 2nd Season as Zaskar Dyne

2023

- My Life as Inukai-san's Dog as Pochita
- Yu-Gi-Oh! Go Rush!! as Shewbahha
- Why Raeliana Ended Up at the Duke's Mansion as Adam Taylor
- Mashle as Milo Genius
- Zom 100: Bucket List of the Dead as Akira Tendo
- Beyblade X as Bird Kazami

2024

- Fluffy Paradise as Ralph Osphe
- The Foolish Angel Dances with the Devil as Yūya Tanigawa
- Studio Apartment, Good Lighting, Angel Included as Shintarō Tokumitsu
- Unnamed Memory as Lazar
- Senpai Is an Otokonoko as Makoto Hanaoka
- Shoshimin: How to Become Ordinary as Jōgorō Kobato
- Too Many Losing Heroines! as Kazuhiro Nukumizu
- My Wife Has No Emotion as Tomiichi Ōtani
- The Many Sides of Voice Actor Radio as Kimura
- Loner Life in Another World as Haruka
- Puniru Is a Cute Slime as Kotaro Kawaii
- Blue Miburo as Chirinu Nio

2025

- My Hero Academia: Vigilantes as Koichi Haimawari
- The Summer Hikaru Died as Hikaru Indō
- Kamitsubaki City Under Construction as Anemosu
- Watari-kun's ****** Is About to Collapse as Naoto Watari
- The Banished Court Magician Aims to Become the Strongest as Alec Yugret
- Dusk Beyond the End of the World as Akira Himegami

2026

- Wash It All Away as Kyusho Ishimochi
- Hikuidori as Shinnosuke Torigoe
- Always a Catch! as Placido di Rubini
- Nippon Sangoku as Muuton Nagao
- Kill Blue as Kotatsu Nekota
- From Overshadowed to Overpowered as Ephtal

2027

- Isshiki-san Wants to Know About Love, Meishi Rokutanda
- Ore to Yu Nii! as Yū Shimizu

=== Anime films ===
2019

- Kabaneri of the Iron Fortress: The Battle of Unato as Kabane

2024

- Given the Movie: To the Sea as Hosogai

2025

- Eiga Senpai wa Otokonoko: Ame Nochi Hare as Makoto Hanaoka

2026

- The Irregular at Magic High School: The Movie – Yotsuba Succession Arc as Kanata Tsutsumi

=== Original net animation ===
2019

- Blade of the Immortal as Makoto

2026

- Cyberpunk: Edgerunners 2 as Maelstrom

2027

- Beat & Motion as Tatsuhiko Hirayama

=== Video games ===
2019

- Readyyy! as Aki Takachiho
- Kazura Uta as Yū Haiji

2020

- Realive! Teito Kagura Butai as Kōya Futaba
- Final Fantasy VII Remake as Chadley
- Hero Cantare as King Dark

2022

- Star Melody Yumemi Dreamer as Kanato Kamio
- Mobile Suit Gundam Extreme Vs. 2 XBoost as Chikage Ebihara

2023

- Mobile Suit Gundam Extreme Vs. 2 OverBoost as Chikage Ebihara

2024

- Final Fantasy VII Rebirth as Chadley
- A3! as Ibuki Dozono
- Mistonia's Hope: The Lost Delight as Linus Ward
- 18Trip as Chihiro Natsuyaki

2025

- Varlet as Fumiya Shimomura
- Story of Seasons: Grand Bazaar as Pierre
- Silver and Blood as Julius

2026

- Genshin Impact as Illuga
- Brigandine: Abyss as Cresct
