= Nomico =

Japanese singer

- Born: 18 February; Tokushima Prefecture, Japan
- Occupation: Singer
- Years active: 2004–present
- Musical career
- Genres: J-pop, electronic, doujin
- Label: Lantis
- Website: https://ameblo.jp/nomico-honey/

Nomico (stylized as nomico, Japanese: のみこ; born 18 February) is a Japanese singer. She is known for featuring on the 2007 single "Bad Apple!!" by Alstroemeria Records, which became viral and earned popularity in internet culture. She has performed songs for a number of anime series and visual novels.

== Career ==
Nomico debuted in 2004 as the lead singer of the musical circle LOOPCUBE. They released their debut album, entitled Nomico no Ōzora in 2004.

In 2006, Nomico signed to the Lantis record label—named Mellow Head at the time—and released her debut studio album Nomico no Mi that same year. Also in 2006, she made her voice acting debut with the anime series Renkin 3-kyū Magical? Pokān, providing the voices of Keimie, an invisible woman who serves as a chaperone of the protagonists, and a pair of talking rabbits named Jun and Tan. She performed the song "Shichaimashō" for the series, which served as her debut single.

In 2007, Nomico featured on the Alstroemeria Records single "Bad Apple!!", which was the sole track to feature vocals on their album Lovelight. The song appeared on the Nico Nico Douga charts. A fanmade shadow art music video of the song went viral both on YouTube and Nico Nico Douga that same year, and is the catalyst for the song's enduring popularity in internet culture; as of January 2025, the music video has gained over 100 million views on YouTube. That same year, she also performed "Skip!" for Moetan, and "Onnanoko Fantasy" and "Yumeiro Hanabi" for Nee Pon? × Rai Pon!.

In 2008, Nomico performed "For Your Yell" for Just ask Nostradamus!.

In 2009, Nomico released her second studio album, Nomical Hystery Hour!. Also in 2009, she performed "Koikora Recycling" for Akikan!.

In 2010, Nomico performed "Karakuri Nemuridan" for Katanagatari.

In 2011, Nomico performed "Randosering" for Mitsudomoe and "Hoshikaze no Horoscope" for Hoshizora e Kakaru Hashi.

In 2023, Nomico featured with several artists on the single "Gyakyū☆Fuwaku☆Fraction", which was the opening theme for My Life as Inukai-san's Dog.

== Filmography ==
=== Television ===
Year	Title	Role	Notes
2006	Renkin 3-kyū Magical? Pokān	Keimie, Jun and Tan	Anime series; main voice role

== Discography ==
=== Albums ===
==== Studio albums ====
Title	Album details
Nomico no Mi (のみこの実)	Released: 21 December 2006; Format: CD, digital download; Label: Mellow Head
Nomical Hystery Hour! (のみこの)	Released: 24 June 2009; Format: CD, digital download; Label: Mellow Head

=== Singles ===
==== Promotional singles ====
Title	Year	Notes
"Shichaimashō" (しちゃいましょう)	2006	Ending theme for Renkin 3-kyū Magical? Pokān
"Skip!" (スキップ!)	2007	Ending theme for Moetan
"Onnanoko Fantasy" (女の子ファンタジー)	2007	Opening theme for Nee Pon? × Rai Pon!
"Yumeiro Hanabi" (夢色花火)	2007	Ending theme for Nee Pon? × Rai Pon!
"For Your Yell"	2008	Opening theme for Just ask Nostradamus!
"Koikora Recycling" (恋空リサイクリング)	2009	Opening theme for Akikan!
"Karakuri Nemuridan" (からくり眠り談)	2010	Ending theme for Katanagatari
"Randosering" (ランドセリング☆)	2011	Ending theme for Mitsudomoe
"Hoshikaze no Horoscope" (星風のホロスコープ)	2011	Ending theme for Hoshizora e Kakaru Hashi
"Gyakyū☆Fuwaku☆Fraction" (逆境☆不惑☆フラクション) (Note: The song was performed by the following artists: Miyuki Hashimoto, Yui Sakakibara, and Rita on main vocals, and Airi, Ayumi, Rekka Katakiri, Yumi Kawamura, Sayaka Sasaki, Duca, Mitsuki Nakae, nomico, Aki Misato, Yozuca, Rino, and Riya on the chorus.)	2023	Opening theme for My Life as Inukai-san's Dog

==== As a featured artist ====
- "Bad Apple!!" by Alstroemeria Records (2007)
