= Studio Apartment, Good Lighting, Angel Included =

Japanese manga series and its adaptation(s)

- First tankōbon volume cover, featuring Towa

ワンルーム、日当たり普通、天使つき。 (Wan Rūmu, Hiatari Futsū, Tenshi-tsuki)
- Genre: Romantic comedy
- Manga
- Written by: matoba
- Published by: Square Enix
- English publisher: NA: Yen Press
- Magazine: Monthly Shōnen Gangan
- Original run: September 12, 2020 – March 12, 2025
- Volumes: 8
- Anime television series
- Directed by: Kenta Ōnishi
- Written by: Shōgo Yasukawa
- Music by: Shunsuke Takizawa
- Studio: Okuruto Noboru
- Licensed by: Crunchyroll: SEA: Medialink
- Original network: Tokyo MX, BS NTV, AT-X, Kansai TV, TV Aichi, HTB
- Original run: April 6, 2024 – June 22, 2024
- Episodes: 12
- icon

Studio Apartment, Good Lighting, Angel Included (Japanese: ワンルーム、日当たり普通、天使つき。, Hepburn: Wan Rūmu, Hiatari Futsū, Tenshi-tsuki) is a Japanese manga series written and illustrated by matoba. It was serialized in Square Enix's Monthly Shōnen Gangan magazine from September 2020 to March 2025 and was compiled into eight tankōbon volumes. An anime television series adaptation produced by Okuruto Noboru aired from April to June 2024.

== Plot ==
Shintarō Tokumitsu is a student who lives alone in an apartment. One day, a gorgeous young girl named Towa appears near his room. She is an angel who was assigned by God to learn from humanity. After convincing him of her identity, she starts to live with him.

== Characters ==
Shintarō Tokumitsu (徳光 森太郎, Tokumitsu Shintarō)
Voiced by: Shūichirō Umeda
A first-year high school student who is currently living alone in a studio apartment. Although he is given an allowance by his parents, he also works part-time at a restaurant. He develops a crush on Towa as they live together.
Towa (とわ)
Voiced by: Hikaru Tono
A beautiful young angel who came down from heaven to learn more about humans. She comes to live in Shintarō's apartment and does the chores for him. Her wings pop out whenever she gets excited. She seems oblivious to Shintarō's feelings for her, but still cares for him deeply.
Tsumugi Tsutsumi (堤 つむぎ, Tsutsumi Tsumugi)
Voiced by: Hana Tamegai
Shintarō's classmate who fell head over heels in love with him at first sight, even though he seems to show no romantic interest in her at all. They briefly met as children but did not reunite until they entered high school. She gets extremely jealous whenever she sees Shintarō interacting with Towa.
Noel Izumi (和泉 のえる, Izumi Noeru)
Voiced by: Saori Ōnishi
Shintarō's workmate at the restaurant. She is actually a yuki-onna. She has the ability to create blizzards when she gets emotional. She initially has a cold personality as she was unable to make friends due to her powers, but opens up after becoming friends with Shintarō and the others. Her name comes from the fact that her birthday is Christmas Eve.
Lilishka (リリーシュカ, Rirīshuka)
Voiced by: Yui Ogura
Shintarō's classmate who is a member of the occult club and has a chūnibyō personality. She is actually a vampire. She works part-time at a maid cafe. Her real name is Sayuri Kagami (賀上 さゆり, Kagami Sayuri).
Hisui Tsurumi (蔓深 ひすい, Tsurumi Hisui)
Voiced by: Kanon Takao
A very shy girl who wears glasses. She is actually a kappa and is the granddaughter of the chairman of Japan's kappa association. She comes from a wealthy family.
Shiu (しう)
Voiced by: Misaki Kuno
A young angel who visited Earth to see Towa. She is very protective of Towa and was against her going to Earth, so she visited her with the intent of bringing her home. She likes milk.
Mari Tokumitsu (徳光 マリ, Tokumitsu Mari)
Voiced by: Ai Kayano
Shintarō's aunt and the owner of the apartment building where he and Towa live. She works as a manga artist and often becomes too engrossed in her work. She has no friends, which made her feel lonely and thus compelled her to celebrate her birthday at Shintarō's apartment. She later develops a fondness for Towa.

== Media ==
=== Manga ===
Written and illustrated by matoba, Studio Apartment, Good Lighting, Angel Included was serialized in Square Enix's Monthly Shōnen Gangan magazine from September 12, 2020, to March 12, 2025. As of April 2025, eight tankōbon volumes have been released.

In December 2021, Yen Press announced that it had licensed the series for English publication.

==== Volumes ====
No.	Original release date	Original ISBN	English release date	English ISBN
1	April 12, 2021	978-4-7575-7196-9	July 5, 2022	978-1-9753-4510-5
2	October 12, 2021	978-4-7575-7528-8	March 21, 2023	978-1-9753-5154-0
3	April 12, 2022	978-4-7575-7875-3	August 22, 2023	978-1-9753-7183-8
4	October 12, 2022	978-4-7575-8198-2	December 12, 2023	978-1-9753-7547-8
5	April 12, 2023	978-4-7575-8520-1	April 16, 2024	978-1-9753-8783-9
6	October 12, 2023	978-4-7575-8847-9	December 10, 2024	978-1-9753-9433-2
7	April 12, 2024	978-4-7575-9149-3	July 22, 2025	979-8-8554-1015-0
8	April 12, 2025	978-4-7575-9789-1	July 28, 2026	979-8-8554-3538-2

=== Anime ===
An anime television series adaptation was announced on October 4, 2023. It is produced by Okuruto Noboru and directed by Kenta Ōnishi, with series composition and episode scripts written by Shōgo Yasukawa, character designs handled by Yūya Uetake, and music composed by Shunsuke Takizawa. The series aired from April 6 to June 22, 2024, on Tokyo MX and other networks. The opening theme song is "Your Color's Miracle" (君色のキセキ, Kimi Iro no Kiseki), performed by Yui Ogura, while the ending theme song is "Sunny Canvas", performed by SoundOrion. Crunchyroll streamed the series.

==== Episodes ====
No.	Title (Note: All English titles are taken from Crunchyroll.)	Directed by	Storyboarded by	Original release date (Note: Episodes are released on ABEMA and Crunchyroll a week before their air dates on television.)
1	"Towa and Shintaro"; Transliteration: "Towa to Shintarō" (Japanese: とわと森太郎)	Kenta Ōnishi	Kenta Ōnishi	April 6, 2024
2	"May I Cook You Lunch?"; Transliteration: "Obentō Tsukutte mo Ii desu ka?" (Japanese: お弁当作ってもいいですか？)	Kenta Ōnishi	Miyana Okita	April 13, 2024
3	"A Cold Friend"; Transliteration: "Tsumetai Tomodachi" (Japanese: つめたい友達)	Yoshihiko Iwata	Miyana Okita	April 20, 2024
4	"The Real Deal is Convincing as Hell"; Transliteration: "Genbutsu no Settokuryoku tte Sugoi wa" (Japanese: 現物の説得力ってすごいわ)	Tatsuya Sasaki	Tatsuya Sasaki	April 27, 2024
5	"The Two After School, the Two After Schools"; Transliteration: "Futari no Hōkago, Futatsu no Hōkago" (Japanese: ふたりの放課後、ふたつの放課後)	Kenta Ōnishi	Kenta Ōnishi	May 4, 2024
6	"The Attack of the Low Pressure Girl"; Transliteration: "Shūrai・Teikiatsu Yōjo" (Japanese: 襲来・低気圧幼女)	Tsutomu Murakami	Hiroaki Yoshikawa	May 11, 2024
7	"What Most Mangaka Are Like After Deadlines"; Transliteration: "Genkō Ake no Mangaka wa Daitai Kou" (Japanese: 原稿明けの漫画家は大体こう)	Tatsuya Sasaki	Yūichi Abe	May 18, 2024
8	"How Wonderful is the Rule of Cool"; Transliteration: "Subarashiki Kana Yōshikibi no Sekai" (Japanese: すばらしきかな様式美の世界)	Yūta Takehara	Hiroaki Yoshikawa	May 25, 2024
9	"Don't Be Scared"; Transliteration: "Kowakunai yo" (Japanese: こわくないよ)	Yūta Takehara	Hitoaki Yoshikawa	June 1, 2024
10	"Towa and Noel Are Both Learning"; Transliteration: "Towa mo Noeru mo, Benkyō Chū" (Japanese: とわものえるも、勉強中)	Keisuke Warita	Hiroaki Yoshikawa	June 8, 2024
11	"To Camp!"; Transliteration: "Gasshuku ni Ikō!" (Japanese: 合宿に行こう!)	Tatsuya Sasaki	Tatsuya Sasaki	June 15, 2024
12	"We Went Way Up High"; Transliteration: "Takai Tokoro ni Itte Mita" (Japanese: 高いところに行ってみた)	Kenta Ōnishi; Hiroaki Yoshikawa	Kenta Ōnishi; Hiroaki Yoshikawa	June 22, 2024

== See also ==
- As Miss Beelzebub Likes, another manga series by the same author
