= Dōjin Work =

Japanese manga series by Hiroyuki

- Dōjin Work manga volume 1.

ドージンワーク (Dōjin Wāku)
- Genre: Comedy
- Manga
- Written by: Hiroyuki
- Published by: Houbunsha
- English publisher: NA: Media Blasters
- Magazine: Manga Time Kirara; Manga Time Kirara Carat; Manga Time Kirara Forward
- Original run: November 28, 2004 – February 9, 2008
- Volumes: 6
- Anime television series
- Directed by: Kenichi Yatagai
- Studio: Remic
- Licensed by: NA: Media Blasters
- Original network: Chiba TV, TVA, TVS
- Original run: July 4, 2007 – September 19, 2007
- Episodes: 12

Dōjin Work (ドージンワーク, Dōjin Wāku) is a Japanese four-panel manga series written and illustrated by Hiroyuki. The story revolves around a young girl named Najimi Osana who is about to make her debut into the dōjin creation world with the help of her experienced friends. Aspects of what it is like to be a dōjin artist are common themes throughout the story. The series was first serialized in the Manga Time Kirara Carat magazine on November 28, 2004, published by Houbunsha. Since then, the manga has also been serialized in two other magazines published by the same company named Manga Time Kirara and Manga Time Kirara Forward. The manga ended serialization in Manga Time Kirara on February 9, 2008, and the chapters collected into 6 tankōbon volumes. An anime television series adaptation aired in Japan between July 4, 2007, and September 19, 2007.

== Plot ==
Dōjin Work follows the life of a young woman named Najimi Osana and her exposure into the dōjin world. She was first tempted into becoming a dōjin artist after seeing how much one of her friends can make at a convention. Najimi loves to draw, though soon learns contrary to what she expected that this new world is anything but easy. As she attends more conventions and meets more people, Najimi eventually manages to find a group of very interesting friends. These friends already have some experience in the field and help her out along the way so that she can someday make a name for herself creating dōjinshi.

== Characters ==
The main characters of Dōjin Work (from left to right): Tsuyuri, Najimi, Justice, and Sōra.

Najimi Osana (長菜なじみ, Osana Najimi)
Voiced by: Masumi Asano
Najimi is an innocent young student at Nerijima University who, after losing her job as a convenience store clerk, decides to switch professions and starts attempting to create dōjinshi, or fan-made manga. She is inspired after seeing her friend Tsuyuri sell her dōjinshi at a comic festival, and after meeting her childhood friend Justice again, who is also a dōjin artist. Her dōjin circle is called Beauty Love House, and Najimi uses the pseudonym Beauty Love when writing her dōjinshi. She gets easily embarrassed when she encounters people seeing her with inappropriate content. Najimi's name is a pun on the Japanese term osananajimi (幼馴染), meaning "childhood friend".

Tsuyuri (露理)
Voiced by: Momoko Saitō
Tsuyuri is a dōjin artist and creates her dōjinshi under the name Bloomer Girl (ブルマ子, Burumako). She is the only member of her dōjin circle which she named Panty Revolution. Her dōjinshi mainly consists of rape manga.

Justice (ジャスティス, Jasutisu)
Voiced by: Hiroki Yasumoto
Justice is a popular dōjin artist who often sells tens of thousands dōjin at a single event, though does not earn much money due to production costs and the low price he sells his dōjin for. He is a childhood friend of Najimi. He appears to be highly protective to Najimi, to the point of getting very annoyed when noticing any man getting close to her. Also, Tsuyuri called Justice a "father figure" when he was overprotective of Najimi when Junichirō wanted to ask her out. In the anime, he is seen as having a "kiddy relationship" with Sōra, however, in the manga, he is shown having an almost pedophiliac relationship with her, including becoming very "tense" and wanting to rub her when she fell and her panties were exposed. He also went crazy after seeing her panties (after Sōra's declaration of love, and her kiss; before that, seeing them had no effect on him) that "even the pain...is transforming into a feeling of joy", until only holding the hand that touched Sōra's bloomers could calm him. It is never quite stated what their relationship is, since Justice seems to have feelings for Najimi, but he tells Sōra he loves her very often.

Sōra Kitano (北野ソーラ, Kitano Sōra)
Voiced by: Kimiko Koyama
Sōra is a little girl that is rarely seen without Justice. She is the youngest main character by far, as Justice, Tsuyuri, and Najimi are all in college and Sōra is the only one apparently too young to participate in Justice's dōjinshi browsing. Her relationship with Justice is often portrayed as somewhat inappropriate, and it has been stated that Justice makes all the cute outfits Sōra wears. Sōra also gave Justice her first kiss, which he suddenly realizes is his first kiss as well. Sōra has stated many times that she loves Justice, and is going to marry him. She wants to set up Najimi with Junichirō so Najimi will not be in the way of Justice and Sōra's relationship.

Junichirō Hoshi (星純一郎, Hoshi Junichirō)
Voiced by: Kazutoshi Hatano
Junichirō is a young man around Najimi's age who she first met in an adult game store while she was buying one such game to help her with drawing her dōjinshi. He later became her first customer the first time she was selling her dōjinshi, though he was the only customer at the time. Later when Najimi gets a job at a cosplay restaurant, he comes every day, which makes Justice believe he is a stalker due to him showing up around Najimi so often. He does in fact have a crush on her, and has to persevere against Justice's antics to get close to her.

Kaneru Nidō (二道かねる, Nidō Kaneru)
Voiced by: Ito Sakata
Kaneru is an office lady in her twenties who enjoys drawing dōjinshi as her hobby, but has poor skills in drawing and creating them. Najimi declares her to be a rival after they both fare poorly in sales at the Comic Market. Tsuyuri artificially encourages this rivalry in the belief that it will make Najimi a better artist and author. Kaneru also misinterprets Justice's and Junichirō's relationship not as antagonistic over Najimi, but a yaoi love affair.

Ryūichirō Hoshi (星龍一郎, Hoshi Ryūichirō)
Voiced by: Daisuke Kishio
Ryūichirō is Junichirō's older brother who works in a publishing company as an editor for a manga magazine. He often gets stressed over his job if he cannot make a deadline.

== Media ==
=== Manga ===
Dōjin Work was written and illustrated by Hiroyuki and began serialization in the Manga Time Kirara Carat magazine on November 28, 2004, published by Houbunsha. The manga has made guest appearances in another manga magazine by the same publishing company called Manga Time Kirara. Starting with the April 2006 issue of Manga Time Kirara Forward, the manga has been serialized side-by-side in Forward and in the original serialization magazine, Carat. The manga ended serialization in Manga Time Kirara on February 9, 2008, and the chapters collected into six tankōbon volumes.

=== Anime ===
An anime television series adaptation animated by Remic aired in Japan from July 4, 2007, to September 19, 2007, and is directed by Kenichi Yatagai. The anime features a live-action segment towards the end of each episode in which voice actors Kimiko Koyama and Momoko Saito try to create their own dōjinshi. Should they fail to do so, the two are to pose in embarrassing costumes as a way of apologizing to the fans. Due to the live-action segment, the anime runs fourteen minutes including the opening and ending animations, which means the live-action segment runs ten minutes. The anime has been licensed by Media Blasters, and they released the first English DVD on January 27, 2009.

The opening and ending theme maxi singles, "I~jan! Yūjō" (い～じゃん!友情; "It's Fine! Friendship") by Maki and "Yumemiru Otome" (夢みる乙女; "Girls Who Dream") by Mai Mizuhashi respectively, were released on July 25, 2007, by Media Factory. The original soundtrack for the anime was released on September 21, 2007, also by Media Factory.
