= Kenichi Yatagai =

Japanese animation director

Kenichi Yatagai (八谷 賢一, Yatagai Ken'ichi) is a Japanese animation director.

== Anime involved in ==
- Bubblegum Crisis: Director (episodes 1–2), Technical Director (episodes 1–2)
- Cardcaptor Sakura: Episode Director (ep 66)
- Dōjin Work: Director, Storyboard (episodes 1, 3, 12)
- El Hazard: The Wanderers: Storyboard (Ep 24)
- Leviathan The Last Defense: Director, Storyboard (Opening; Ending; episode 1), Unit Director (Opening; Ending)
- Megazone 23 Part III: Director (episode 1)
- Renkin 3-kyuu Magical? Pokahn: Director, Storyboard (episodes 1–2, 6a, 7, 12a), Unit Director (episode 12a)
- Strike Witches: Assistant Director
- Strike Witches 2: Storyboard (episodes 3, 12), Episode Director (episode 12), Assistant Director
- Strike Witches: Operation Victory Arrow: Episode Director (episode 1)
- Super Dimensional Fortress Macross II: Lovers Again: Director, Storyboard (episode 1), Episode Director (episode 6)
- Tenchi Muyo! Ryo-Ohki OAV 2: Director, Storyboard (episode 13)
- Tenchi Muyo! Ryo-Ohki OAV 3: Director, Storyboard (episodes 1, 5), Episode Director (episode 3)
- Tenchi Muyo! The Night Before The Carnival: Director, Storyboard
- The Super Dimension Fortress Macross: In-Between Animation (ep 21)
