= Remic =

Japanese animation studio

REMIC
- Native name: 有限会社レミック
- Romanized name: Yūgen geisha Remikku
- Type: Yūgen-gaisha
- Industry: Japanese animation
- Founder: Katsuhiko Nozawa
- Headquarters: Japan
- Key people: Katsuhiko Nozawa (CEO)

Remic Co., Ltd. (Japanese: 有限会社レミック, Hepburn: Yūgen-gaisha Remikku; stylized REMIC or R E M I C) was a Japanese animation studio notable for producing the anime series Renkin 3-kyū Magical? Pokān and Dōjin Work. The studio was founded by producer Katsuhiko Nozawa following his departure from studio Daume. The studio ceased operations as of 2015, after the withdrawal of its animation production business and gross contract work since 2012.

== Produced series ==
- Renkin 3-kyū Magical? Pokān
  - Series run: April 4, 2006 — June 20, 2006
  - Episodes: 12 x 24 minutes
- Dōjin Work
  - Series run: July 4, 2007 — September 19, 2007
  - Episodes: 12 x 24 minutes
- R-15
  - Episode 9 only
