= Okuruto Noboru =

Japanese animation studio

Okuruto Noboru Inc.
- Logo used since 2017
- Native name: 株式会社オクルトノボル
- Romanized name: Kabushiki-gaisha Okuruto Noboru
- Type: Kabushiki gaisha
- Industry: Japanese animation
- Founded: December 1, 2017
- Headquarters: Nishiikebukuro, Toshima, Tokyo, Japan
- Key people: Wani Koguchi (CEO)
- Number of employees: 40
- Website: okurutonoboru.co.jp

Okuruto Noboru Inc. (Japanese: 株式会社オクルトノボル, Hepburn: Kabushiki-gaisha Okuruto Noboru) is a Japanese animation studio based in Tokyo founded on December 1, 2017, by ex-Gonzo/David Production producer Wani Koguchi.

== Works ==
=== Television series ===
Title	Director(s)	First run start date	First run end date	Eps	Note(s)	Ref(s)
The Girl in Twilight	Jin Tamamura; Yūichi Abe	October 1, 2018	December 17, 2018	12	Multimedia franchise. Co-animated with Dandelion Animation Studio. Episodes 8–13.	
The Hidden Dungeon Only I Can Enter	Kenta Ōnishi	January 9, 2021	March 27, 2021	12	Based on a light novel series written by Meguru Seto.	
How Not to Summon a Demon Lord Ω	Satoshi Kuwabara	April 9, 2021	June 11, 2021	10	Sequel to How Not to Summon a Demon Lord by Ajiado. Co-production with Tezuka Productions. Okuruto Noboru animated episodes 2 and 7.	
Tomodachi Game	Hirofumi Ogura	April 6, 2022	June 22, 2022	12	Based on a manga series written by Yuki Sato.	
My Instant Death Ability Is So Overpowered	Masakazu Hishida	January 5, 2024	March 22, 2024	12	Based on a light novel series written by Tsuyoshi Fujitaka.	
Studio Apartment, Good Lighting, Angel Included	Kenta Ōnishi	April 6, 2024	June 15, 2024	12	Based on a manga series written by matoba.	
Viral Hit	Masakazu Hishida	April 11, 2024	June 27, 2024	12	Based on a manhwa written by Taejun Pak.	
Even Given the Worthless "Appraiser" Class, I'm Actually the Strongest	Kenta Ōnishi	January 9, 2025	March 27, 2025	12	Based on a light novel series written by Ibarakino.	
A Couple of Cuckoos (season 2)	Masakazu Hishida	July 8, 2025	September 23, 2025	12	Sequel to A Couple of Cuckoos by Shin-Ei Animation and SynergySP.	
Wash It All Away	Kenta Ōnishi	January 5, 2026	March 23, 2026	12	Based on a manga series written by Mitsuru Hattori.	

=== Original video animation ===
Title	Release date	Eps	Note(s)	Ref(s)
Hyperdimension Neptunia: Nepu no Natsuyasumi	July 8, 2019	1	OVA episode for Hyperdimension Neptunia: The Animation.	
Planetarian: Snow Globe	August 25, 2021	1	OVA episode for Planetarian: The Reverie of a Little Planet.	
Hyperdimension Neptunia: Nep Nep Darake no Festival	October 26, 2022	1	OVA episode for Hyperdimension Neptunia: The Animation.	
Hyperdimension Neptunia: Hidamari no Little Purple	April 26, 2023	1	OVA episode for Hyperdimension Neptunia: The Animation.	
