= Asterism (band) =

Japanese rock band formed 2014

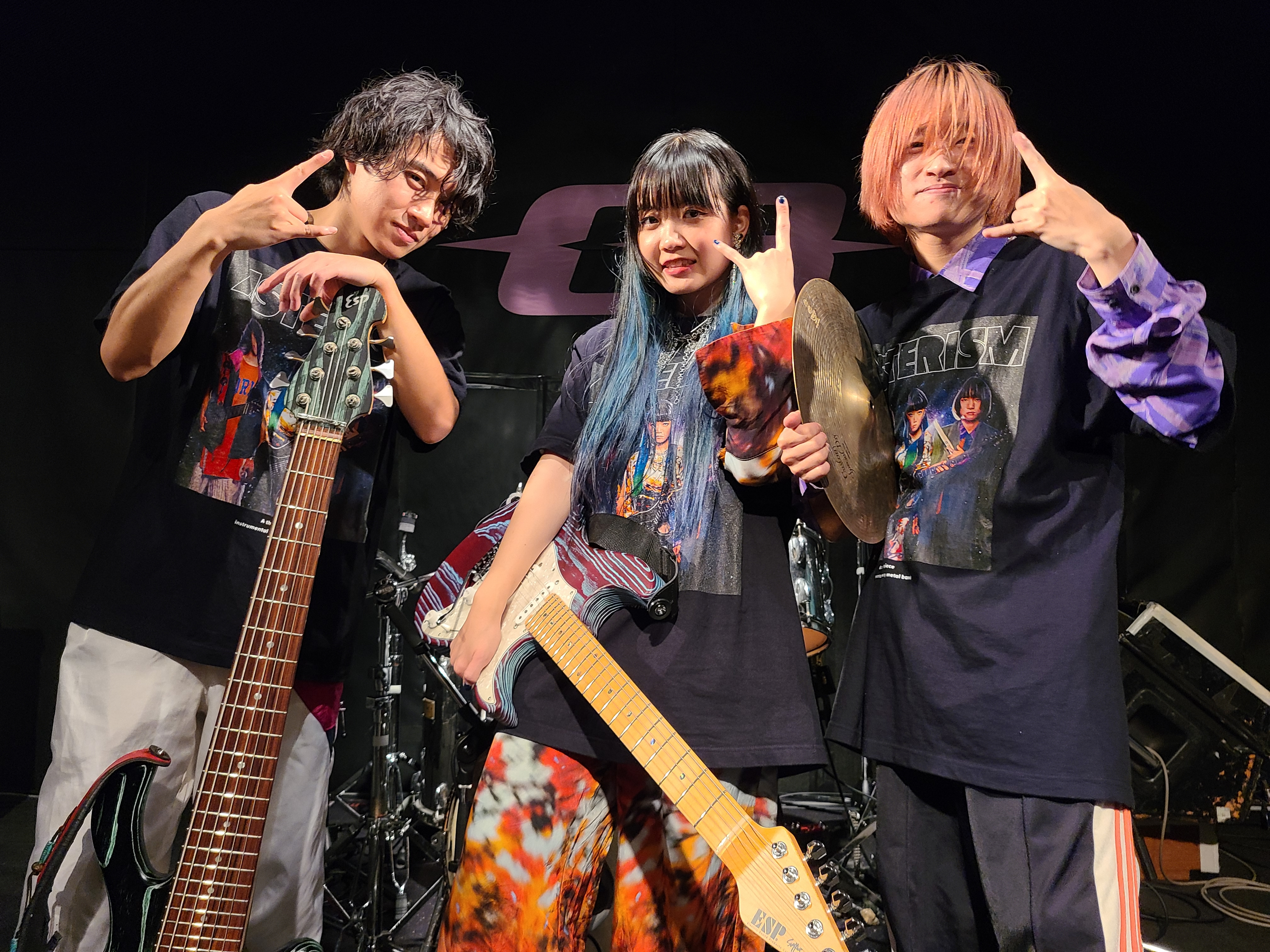
- ASTERISM in 2023. (L-R): Miyu, Hal-ca, Mio

Background information
- Origin: Fukuoka, Japan
- Genres: Heavy metal, Hard rock
- Years active: 2014–present
- Labels: Yamaha Music Publishing, Tokuma Japan, Amuse Inc., SME Records/Sony Music Japan
- Members: Hal-ca (guitar, vocals); Miyu (bass, chorus); Mio (drums, chorus)
- Website: asterism.asia

Asterism (stylized in all caps) is a Japanese rock band formed in Fukuoka in 2014 by Hal-ca (guitar) and brothers Mio (drums) and Miyu (bass).

The band has toured the United States, South Korea, China, Saudi Arabia, Thailand, Singapore, and Japan, including performances at SXSW Music Festival, Knotfest Japan, and Taihu Midi Festival.

Asterism has gained international recognition for the combination of their collective youth and advanced technical skill as instrumentalists. The band is managed by Japanese talent agency Amuse, Inc.

== History ==
In 2014, the band members participated separately in Yamaha's 8th Music Revolution competition, with Hal-ca performing as a solo guitarist and brothers Miyu and Mio performing as a duo under the name Ogi. Yamaha executives introduced the musicians, and the decision was made to create the group Asterism.

On November 1, 2015, Asterism (performing under the name "Hal-ca") won both the Outstanding Performance Award and Audience Award at the Kyushu-Okinawa final round of "The 9th Music Revolution" sponsored by Yamaha.

On June 15, 2016, the band released their first CD single, "Got Your Back/Wonder Rocket".

In November 2017, Asterism released their first recorded EP titled The Session Vol. 1, including instrumental covers of songs by Metallica, Judas Priest, and Ozzy Osbourne.

In January 2018, they released their second EP The Session Vol. 2, including covers of songs by Rage Against the Machine, Rush, and Motorhead. The same month, the band began performing a series of live concerts on Facebook from the Hard Rock Cafe in Fukuoka. American bassist and producer Bootsy Collins reposted a performance by Asterism on his Facebook page and contacted the band about collaborating on new material.

In August 2018, Asterism released their first full album, Ignition, which included two songs produced by Collins with additional guitar by Buckethead. The album also included covers of Beatles and Dio.

In January 2019, Asterism began touring outside of Japan with their first Asia tour in China and Thailand. On March 2, they performed their first one-man shows titled "Welcome to Inferno Vol. Max" at Graf in Fukuoka, followed by a second one-man at Shimokitazawa Liveholic. That same month, the band toured the United States with performances at SXSW in Austin, Texas, and additional stops in Houston, Dallas, and Los Angeles.

The band returned to China in April and May for a six city headlining tour including performances at the Taihu Midi Festival in Suzhou. In August, they performed at the Gangwon Rock Festival in South Korea. In October, they performed a five city tour of South Korea and China, and appeared at Music China 2019 at the Shanghai New International Expo.

In December 2020, Asterism released their third EP Guernica, followed by their second full album Guernica+a, released in September 2021, which added four new tracks.

In September 2022, Asterism released the concept album Animetic, which contained covers of theme songs from several Japanese anime, including Jujutsu Kaisen, Tokyo Ghoul, Naruto: Shippūden, My Hero Academia, and Mobile Suit Gundam Unicorn Re:0096. In December, the band teamed with Norwegian anisong cover singer Pellek for the digital release "Ichizu / Unravel", performing the theme songs from Jujutsu Kaisen 0 and Tokyo Ghoul. This single was the first release to include Hal-ca performing vocals, and the songs were added to the re-release of the album retitled Animetic+p in June 2023.

Asterism's fourth EP Aside was released in March 2023, and their fifth EP Beside in September 2023. Both releases featured Hal-ca performing vocals and guitar.

On April 1, 2023, Asterism performed at Knotfest Japan at Makuhari Messe. On June 5, the band appeared on NHK's English-language music program J-Melo. On July 1, Asterism was the featured musical performer at the Anime Expo 2023 opening ceremony and performed two free concerts in California and New York. On August 27, they performed at the Gamers8 - Gamers Cosplay Cup festival in Saudi Arabia.

The band's third full album Decide was released in November 2023, including songs from the two previous EPs and the new song "Shooting Star". The release was followed by a national tour of Japan titled Asterism "Decide" Release Tour 2023 -The Decision. On November 8, the band released the music video for "Shooting Star", featuring footage from their U.S. tour. On November 24 and 25, Asterism performed at Anime Festival Asia Singapore.

In March 2024, Asterism released the live album The Decision (Live in Tokyo 23.11.2023). On March 8, 9, and 10, they performed at Japan Expo in Marseilles, France. In June, the band collaborated with manga artist Acky Bright to create the concept album Planet of Metal. In July, the band performed at Anime Expo in Los Angeles and at Japan Expo in Paris.

In December, it was announced that the band would perform the song "Crescendo" as the opening theme for the TV anime series Even Given the Worthless "Appraiser’"Class, I’m Actually the Strongest, with the single release scheduled for January 24, 2025.

ASTERISM's 4th Album, "Kick Down the Wall", was released on January 14, 2026.

== Band members ==
Hal-ca (b: 11/23/2002) – guitar, vocals (2014–present)

Miyu (b: 3/12/2002) – bass, chorus (2014–present)

Mio (b: 11/14/1999) – drums, chorus (2014–present)

== Musical style ==
Asterism describes their style as "mass metal", with the goal of composing music that can reach a broad global audience.

Bassist Miyu performs on a unique 7-string bass created for him by ESP.

== Discography ==
=== Albums ===
Year	Album details	Notes
2018	Ignition: Released: August 22, 2018; Label: Tokuma Japan; Formats: CD, CD/DVD, digital	Track list: 1. Blaze (Bootsy Collins: Producer/Bass/Vocals; Buckethead: Guitar); 2. Light in the Darkness; 3. Midnight Hunter; 4. Warning (Bootsy Collins: Producer/Bass/Vocals; Buckethead: Guitar); 5. Dawn; 6. Up The Horns!; 7. Stand Up and Shout (DIO/cover); 8. Helter Skelter (The Beatles/cover); 9. Overdrive; 10. God Speed You!; 11. Disperse; Videography: 1. 55 music video 2. Rising Moon music video 3. Blaze music video 4. Live performance digest video 5. Behind the scenes/recording
2021	Guernica+a: Released: September 15, 2021; Label: Amuse, Inc.; Formats: CD, digital	Track list: 1. Stars; 2. Then & Now; 3. Full Throttle; 4. Museum of Death; 5. Music; 6. Gunfire; 7. Faced/Burned; 8. Church; 9. Day26; 10. 000
2023	Animetic+p: Released: June 28, 2023; Label: Asterhythm Music; Formats: CD, digital	Track list: 1. Kaikaikitan (OP theme song for anime Jujutsu Kaisen); 2. Unravel (OP theme song for anime Tokyo Ghoul); 3. Sora ni Utaeba (OP theme song for anime My Hero Academia); 4. Polaris (OP theme song for anime My Hero Academia); 5. Kyouran Hey Kids!! (OP theme song for anime Noragami); 6. Silhouette (OP theme song for anime Naruto: Shippūden); 7. Asphyxia (OP theme song for anime Tokyo Ghoul:re); 8. Kimi no Shiranai Monogatari (ED theme song for anime Bakemonogatari); 9. Next 2U -eUC- (ED theme song for anime Mobile Suit Gundam Unicorn RE:0096); 10. Ichizu Pellek ver. (OP theme song for anime Jujutsu Kaisen 0); 11. Unravel Pellek ver. (OP theme song for anime Tokyo Ghoul)
2023	Decide: Released: November 1, 2023; Label: SME Records/Sony Music Japan; Formats: CD	Track list: 1. Stardom; 2. Fiction; 3. Choir; 4. Last World; 5. No Way; 6. Live House; 7. Hullabaloo; 8. Sunny; 9. Finally; 10. Metal; 11. Shooting Star
2024	The Decision (Live in Tokyo 23.11.2023): Released: March 8, 2024; Label: SME Records/Sony Music Japan; Formats: Digital	Track list: 1. Stardom; 2. No Way; 3. Sunny; 4. Choir; 5. Last World; 6. Hullabaloo; 7. Shooting Star; 8. Blaze; 9. Gunfire; 10. Light in the Darkness; 11. Fiction; 12. Live House; 13. Finally; 14. Full Throttle; 15. Peace; 16. Metal
2026	Kick Down the Wall: Released: January 14, 2026; Label: SME Records/Sony Music Japan; Formats: CD / Digital	Track list: 1. Blink Of Ray; 2. Black Clouds; 3. Kakuto; 4. You Don't Know Anything About Me; 5. Sex Jazz; 6. 儚 7. Stress; 8. Metal Supreme; 9. Eternal; 10. Homeship; 11. Last Rhythm

=== Singles and EPs ===
Year	Single and EP details	Notes
2016	Got Your Back!/Wonder Rocket (Got your back! ～ガチヤバ!～/Wonder Rocket): Released: November 15, 2017; Label: Yamaha Music Publishing; Formats: CD	Track list: 1. Got Your Back!～ガチヤバ～; 2. Wonder Rocket
2017	The Session Vol. 1: Released: November 15, 2017; Label: Tokuma Japan; Formats: CD, digital	Track list: 1. 155; 2. Enter Sandman (Metallica/cover); 3. Ram It Down (Judas Priest/cover); 4. Bark at the Moon (Ozzy Osbourne/cover); 5. Magic Bullet
2018	The Session Vol. 2: Released: January 24, 2018; Label: Tokuma Japan; Formats: CD, digital	Track list: 1. Rising Moon; 2. Guerrilla Radio feat. Maki Oyama (Rage Against The Machine/cover); 3. YYZ (Rush/cover); 4. Ace of Spades (Motorhead/cover); 5. Yunagi
2020	Guernica: Released: December 9, 2020; Label: Amuse, Inc.; Formats: CD, digital	Track list: 1. Music; 2. Gunfire; 3. Faced/ Burned; 4. Church; 5. Day26; 6. 000
2022	Ichizu / Unravel: Released: December 9, 2022; Label: Asterhythm Music; Formats: Digital	Track list: 1. Ichizu; 2. Unravel
2023	Aside: Released: March 31, 2023; Label: SME/Sony Music; Formats: Digital	Track list: 1. Fiction; 2. Choir; 3. Hullabaloo; 4. Live House; 5. Metal
2023	Beside: Released: September 1, 2023; Label: SME/Sony Music; Formats: Digital	Track list: 1. Stardom; 2. Sunny; 3. No Way; 4. Last World; 5. Finally
