= Magic Stone Gourmet =

Japanese light novel series

- Magic Stone Gourmet: Eating Magical Power Made Me the Strongest!
- First light novel volume cover

魔石グルメ 魔物の力を食べたオレは最強！ (Maseki Gurume Mamono no Chikara o Tabeta Ore wa Saikyō!)
- Genre: Fantasy, isekai, harem
- Novel series
- Written by: Ryou Yuuki
- Published by: Shōsetsuka ni Narō
- Original run: September 9, 2017 – present
- Light novel
- Written by: Ryou Yuuki
- Illustrated by: Chisato Naruse
- Published by: Fujimi Shobo
- English publisher: NA: J-Novel Club
- Imprint: Kadokawa Books
- Original run: November 10, 2018 – June 10, 2021
- Volumes: 9
- Manga
- Written by: Ryou Yuuki
- Illustrated by: Kenji Sugawara
- Published by: Fujimi Shobo
- English publisher: NA: Kadokawa
- Imprint: Dragon Comics Age
- Magazine: DraDra Flat
- Original run: June 7, 2019 – present
- Volumes: 14

Magic Stone Gourmet: Eating Magical Power Made Me the Strongest! (魔石グルメ 魔物の力を食べたオレは最強！, Maseki Gurume Mamono no Chikara o Tabeta Ore wa Saikyō) is a Japanese light novel series written by Ryou Yuuki and illustrated by Chisato Naruse. It began serialization on the user-generated novel publishing website Shōsetsuka ni Narō in September 2017. It was later acquired by Fujimi Shobo who published it under their Kadokawa Books imprint from November 2018 to June 2021. A manga adaptation illustrated by Kenji Sugawara began serialization on the Nico Nico Seiga website under Fujimi Shobo's DraDra Flat brand in June 2019.

== Plot ==
Ein, a man who actually reincarnated from Earth following an embarrassing death, has long been mocked for his skill Toxic Decomposition EX, leading to him being unhappy with his life. However, he then finds out that not only is he actually the crown prince of a neighboring kingdom, but his skill turns out to be useful after all: it allows him to eat magic stones. Returning to his kingdom and armed with his new knowledge, Ein now works to prepare himself to become the kingdom's next King, while using his skill in fighting monsters.

== Characters ==
Ein (アイン, Ain)
Voiced by: Ayumu Murase (voice comic)
A noble with a skill that allows him to eat magic stones. In his previous life, he died after panicking when seeing a cockroach, leading to a knife somehow stabbing this throat.
Olivia (オリビア, Oribia)
Voiced by: Mai Fuchigami (voice comic)
Logas (ローガス, Rōgasu)
Voiced by: Shinji Nagano (voice comic)
Camilla (カミラ, Kamira)
Voiced by: Yumika Yano (voice comic)
Butler (執事, Shitsuji)
Voiced by: Junpei Asahina (voice comic)

== Media ==
=== Light novel ===
Written by Ryou Yuuki, Magic Stone Gourmet: Eating Magical Power Made Me the Strongest! began serialization on the user-generated novel publishing website Shōsetsuka ni Narō on September 9, 2017. It was later acquired by Fujimi Shobo who published nine volumes with illustrations by Chisato Naruse under its Kadokawa Books imprint from November 10, 2018 to June 10, 2021. The series is licensed in English by J-Novel Club.

No.	Original release date	Original ISBN	North American release date	North American ISBN
1	November 10, 2018	978-4-04-072955-8	June 8, 2023	978-1-71-838957-1
2	March 9, 2019	978-4-04-072957-2	August 24, 2023	978-1-71-838959-5
3	July 10, 2019	978-4-04-073297-8	November 9, 2023	978-1-71-838961-8
4	November 9, 2019	978-4-04-073298-5	February 15, 2024	978-1-71-838963-2
5	February 10, 2020	978-4-04-073483-5	May 2, 2024	978-1-71-838965-6
6	June 10, 2020	978-4-04-073675-4	July 11, 2024	978-1-71-838967-0
7	October 10, 2020	978-4-04-073822-2	December 5, 2024	978-1-71-838969-4
8	February 10, 2021	978-4-04-073824-6	February 18, 2025	978-1-71-838971-7
9	June 10, 2021	978-4-04-074081-2	April 29, 2025	978-1-71-838973-1

=== Manga ===
A manga adaptation illustrated by Kenji Sugawara began serialization on the Nico Nico Seiga website under Fujimi Shobo's DraDra Flat brand on June 7, 2019. The manga's chapters have been compiled into fourteen tankōbon volumes as of November 2026.

During their panel at Virtual Crunchyroll Expo 2021, Kadokawa announced that they had licensed the manga for English publication on their BookWalker website.

No.	Release date	ISBN
1	November 9, 2019	978-4-04-073392-0
2	June 9, 2020	978-4-04-073688-4
3	December 9, 2020	978-4-04-073908-3
4	August 6, 2021	978-4-04-074208-3
5	January 8, 2022	978-4-04-074388-2
6	July 8, 2022	978-4-04-074595-4
7	December 9, 2022	978-4-04-074777-4
8	June 9, 2023	978-4-04-074989-1
9	January 9, 2024	978-4-04-075277-8
10	September 9, 2024	978-4-04-075513-7
11	March 7, 2025	978-4-04-075839-8
12	September 9, 2025	978-4-04-076077-3
13	April 9, 2026	978-4-04-076339-2
14	November 9, 2026	978-4-04-076630-0

=== Other ===
In commemoration of the release of the manga's first volume in November 2019, a TV commercial featuring narration by Ayumu Murase was aired during Cautious Hero: The Hero Is Overpowered but Overly Cautious's timeslot.

In commemoration of the release of the manga's second volume in June 2020, a voice comic adaptation was uploaded to the Kadokawa YouTube channel. It featured the voice performances of Ayumu Murase and Mai Fuchigami.

== Reception ==
By April 2026, the series had over 2.2 million copies in circulation.

== See also ==
- My Instant Death Ability Is So Overpowered, another light novel series with the same illustrator
