= My Instant Death Ability Is So Overpowered =

Japanese light novel series

- My Instant Death Ability Is So Overpowered, No One in This Other World Stands a Chance Against Me!
- First light novel volume cover, featuring Tomochika Dannōra (left) and Yogiri Takatō (right)

即死チートが最強すぎて、異世界のやつらがまるで相手にならないんですが。 (Sokushi Chīto ga Saikyōsugite, Isekai no Yatsura ga marude Aite ni Naranain Desu ga)
- Genre: Adventure, fantasy comedy, isekai
- Novel series
- Written by: Tsuyoshi Fujitaka
- Published by: Shōsetsuka ni Narō
- Original run: February 21, 2016 – March 15, 2023
- Light novel
- Written by: Tsuyoshi Fujitaka
- Illustrated by: Chisato Naruse
- Published by: Earth Star Entertainment
- English publisher: NA: J-Novel Club Yen Press (print)
- Imprint: Earth Star Novel
- Original run: October 15, 2016 – February 15, 2024
- Volumes: 14 + extra volume
- Manga

My Instant Death Ability Is So Overpowered, No One in This Other World Stands a Chance Against Me! —AΩ—
- Written by: Tsuyoshi Fujitaka
- Illustrated by: Hanamaru Nanto
- Published by: Earth Star Entertainment
- English publisher: NA: J-Novel Club; Yen Press (print)
- Imprint: Earth Star Comics
- Magazine: Comic Earth Star
- Original run: March 30, 2018 – present
- Volumes: 13
- Anime television series
- Directed by: Masakazu Hishida
- Written by: Masakazu Hishida (Note: Masakazu Hishida is credited as writer under the alias Jō Aoba (青葉 譲, Aoba Jō).)
- Music by: Hanae Nakamura; Tatsuhiko Saiki; Kanade Sakuma; Daisuke Kadowaki
- Studio: Okuruto Noboru
- Licensed by: Sentai Filmworks: SEA: Muse Communication
- Original network: Tokyo MX, BS11, AT-X, MBS, GYT
- Original run: January 5, 2024 – March 22, 2024
- Episodes: 12
- icon

My Instant Death Ability Is So Overpowered, No One in This Other World Stands a Chance Against Me! (即死チートが最強すぎて、異世界のやつらがまるで相手にならないんですが。, Sokushi Chīto ga Saikyōsugite, Isekai no Yatsura ga marude Aite ni Naranain Desu ga), commonly known simply as Instant Death, is a Japanese light novel series written by Tsuyoshi Fujitaka. The series originated on the Shōsetsuka ni Narō website, which the author closed on December 10, 2023, before being published in print with illustrations by Chisato Naruse by Earth Star Entertainment from October 2016 to March 2023 for 14 volumes. A manga adaptation, illustrated by Hanamaru Nanto, began serialization in Comic Earth Star in March 2018. As of January 2026, the series' individual chapters have been collected into thirteen volumes. An anime television series adaptation produced by Okuruto Noboru aired from January to March 2024.

== Plot ==
While heading to a school field trip, Yogiri Takatou's school bus is summoned to another world by a Sage who shows just how horrible she and this world is by killing the adults for petty reasons and telling the students they are to be trained as sages to fight demons and complete missions. She only takes the gifted ones, leaving the rest (including Yogiri and his classmate Tomochika Dannora) to die.

With no choice but to continue, Yogiri and Tomochika search for a way back to their own world, but Yogiri's unnatural calm apathy towards the oddity unnerves Tomochika. In truth, Yogiri is not an ordinary kid... he can kill anything or anyone he wishes just by willing it.

== Characters ==
Yogiri Takatou (高遠 夜霧, Takatō Yogiri)
Voiced by: Koki Uchiyama (Japanese); David Matranga, Shannon Emerick (young) (English)
A seemingly normal high-school student who is transported to another world with his classmates during a field trip. As one of the few students who did not obtain a special ability, Yogiri is left to die by sage Sion. However, he does have a secret power that allows him to kill anything instantly at will, and because of it, he is raised in a secret lab where he was put under observation by the government.
His foster mother installed in him the restraint of not using his power on inconveniences and only when he or a loved one is in danger. Despite this, he prefers to intimidate obviously weak willed people by showing off his power on objects.
The anime gives him tufts of hair subtly resembling devil horns.
Tomochika Dannoura (壇ノ浦 知千佳, Dannoura Tomochika)
Voiced by: Miyu Tomita (Japanese); Monica Rial (English)
Yogiri's classmate who was also left behind by Sage Sion for not having obtained a special power. She befriends Yogiri and accompanies him in his quest to look for a way back to their original world. Her family runs a martial arts dojo. It is implied Yogiri might have a crush on her.
Mokomoko Dannoura (壇ノ浦 もこもこ, Dannoura Mokomoko)
Voiced by: Tomoko Kaneda (Japanese); Joanne Bonasso (English)
The guardian spirit of the Dannoura family who watches over Tomochika who is originally from the Heian period. She is the one responsible for Tomochika not having obtained a special power because she was wary of it. Mokomoko also encourages Tomochika to get into a relationship with Yogiri so he could marry into the Dannoura family in order to always protect her, although Tomochika isn't sure if she has feelings for him.
Sion (シオン, Shion)
Voiced by: Yui Horie (Japanese); Kristen McGuire (English)
Sion is one of the many sages in the other world and was responsible for summoning Takato and his classmates. Sion is known as the strongest sage in the other world and as such is very arrogant and believes herself to be invincible. It is revealed later on that in the past she herself was summoned to the other world from Japan as well and eventually became a powerful sage.
Lain (レイン, Rein)
Voiced by: Rina Satō (Japanese); Karlii Hoch (English)
Lain is one of the many sages of the other world. She is also a vampire and is immortal, due to this she is impossible to kill normally. Lain attempted to kill Takatou, but was killed by him instead.
Daimon Hanakawa (花川 大門, Hanakawa Daimon)
Voiced by: Hiro Shimono (Japanese); Greg Cote (English)
Daimon is one of the sage candidates, like his classmates he willingly abandoned Takatou, Tomochika, and two of his classmates on their school bus. He and two of his classmates attempted to kill Takatou and enslave Tomochika, but his two classmates were killed and he was spared. It is revealed that this was actually the second time that he had been summoned to that other world and was sent back after accomplishing his duties.
Yuuki Tachibana (橘 裕樹, Tachibana Yūki)
Voiced by: Yoshiki Murakami
Tachibana was also a classmate of Takatou's. His class was dominator which allowed him to enslave anyone or anything, which in turn raised his level. By the time he reunited with Takatou and Tomochika he had enslaved five girls, he attempted to recruit Tomochika but she refused. He was eventually killed by Takatou after attempting to kill him and Tomochika.
Asaka Takatou (高遠 朝霞, Takatō Asaka)
Voiced by: Lynn (Japanese); Shelley Calene-Black (English)
Asaka was Takatou's caretaker and adoptive mother, she allowed him to use her last name as his own. Asaka was the reason that Takatou placed limiters on his powers and refrained from killing indiscriminately. In the past, Asaka was kidnapped by another organization to use her as a hostage, but they were all massacred by Takatou.
Rick (リック, Rikku)
Voiced by: Mark Ishii
Rick was a sage candidate and met Takatou and Tomochika during the Sword Master trials. He ended up killing Vahanato and became the new sword master after the death of the previous one.
Lynel (ライニール, Rainīru)
Voiced by: Sho Nogami
Lynel was first shown during the sword master trials, he is shown to have extremely bad luck and almost always gets injured.
Theodisia (テオディジア, Teodijia)
Voiced by: Akira Sekine
Theodisia is a half-demon and was first introduced during the sword master trials. She met Takatou and Tomochika and asked for their help as she was currently searching for her sister Euphemia. Theodisia was responsible for killing the first sword master after learning that he had been experimenting on her people.
Sora Akino (秋野 蒼空, Akino Sora)
Voiced by: Sayaka Kikuchi
Sora Akino was also one of Takatou's classmates and a sage candidate. In their previous world, she was known as an idol, and after being summoned to the other world, she took leadership of her class.
Ryōko Ninomiya (二宮 諒子, Ninomiya Ryōko)
Voiced by: Kiyono Yasuno
Ryouko is a sage candidate, her class being samurai in the other world. Ryouko is a spy that was sent by the Japanese government to keep an eye on Takatou, she is aware of his abilities and as such is careful not to get on his bad side. Ryouko has a program on her phone that lets her keep taps on Takatou's powers and lets her know if any of his seals have been opened. After reuniting, Ryouko immediately pledged her allegiance to Takatou and became one of his allies.
Carol S. Lane (キャロル・S・レーン, Kyaroru S Rēn)
Voiced by: Anna Suzuki
Carol is a sage candidate, her class is ninja, which she claims doesn't fit her. Carol is revealed to be a spy sent by America to keep an eye on Takatou. However, Carol was naive when it came to Takatou as she thought they could take Tomochika hostage to use against him. However, Ryouko warned her against doing this as this would guarantee her demise. After witnessing Takatou's abilities she decided to remain on his good side and became one of his allies.
Haruto Ōtori (鳳 春人, Ōtori Haruto)
Voiced by: Shōhei Komatsu (Japanese); Adam Gibbs (English)
Haruto was a sage candidate and a minor antagonist. He was the one that helped his classmates reach their true potential in their respective classes. Haruto was eventually tasked by Sion to kill Takatou, but this backfired as he not only managed to escape his trap, but he killed the evil god as well.
Suguru Yazaki (矢崎 卓, Yazaki Suguru)
Voiced by: Shogo Sakata (Japanese); Scott Gibbs (English)
Suguru was a sage candidate and was responsible for abandoning Takatou, Tomochika, and his two classmates on the bus. Suguru was shown to be frustrated as Sora Akino took leadership of their class as he believed himself to be a general. Suguru during the death match attempted to kill Sora Akino, but was killed by her instead.
Ayaka Shinozaki (篠崎 綾香, Shinozaki Ayaka)
Voiced by: Rumi Okubo
Ayaka was one of Takatou's classmates and was summoned to the other world as a sage candidate. However, she along with Takatou, Tomochika, and one of her classmates was abandoned on the bus as the four of them did not receive the power of the system. Ayaka was presumed dead after being killed by a dragon, but later on she was revealed to be alive. It was revealed that Ayaka was actually a highly advanced artificial human, that was created to be used against Takatou. Ayaka consumed the remains of the dragon that killed her and gained its powers, she proceeded to use them to get revenge against her classmates who abandoned her. In total, she managed to kill nine of her classmates, before being killed by Takatou himself.

== Media ==
=== Light novel ===
Written by Tsuyoshi Fujitaka, the series was serialized on the novel posting website Shōsetsuka ni Narō from February 21, 2016, to March 15, 2023. It was later acquired by Earth Star Entertainment, who published the series in print with illustrations by Chisato Naruse from October 15, 2016, to March 15, 2023, for 14 volumes. An extra "Cleanup Edition" volume taking place after the final volume was released on February 15, 2024.

At Anime Expo Lite in 2020, J-Novel Club announced that they licensed the light novel for English publication. At Anime NYC 2022, J-Novel announced that the light novel would receive a print release by Yen Press.

==== Volumes ====
No.	Original release date	Original ISBN	English release date	English ISBN
1	October 15, 2016	978-4-8030-0962-0	September 21, 2020 (digital); May 23, 2023 (print)	978-1-7183-3314-7 (digital); 978-1-9753-6830-2 (print)
2	February 15, 2017	978-4-8030-1000-8	November 25, 2020 (digital); September 19, 2023 (print)	978-1-7183-3316-1 (digital); 978-1-9753-6831-9 (print)
3	July 15, 2017	978-4-8030-1084-8	January 25, 2021 (digital); January 23, 2024 (print)	978-1-7183-3318-5 (digital); 978-1-9753-6832-6 (print)
4	January 16, 2018	978-4-8030-1149-4	April 5, 2021 (digital); May 21, 2024 (print)	978-1-7183-3320-8 (digital); 978-1-9753-6833-3 (print)
5	August 16, 2018	978-4-8030-1220-0	July 27, 2021 (digital); August 20, 2024 (print)	978-1-7183-3322-2 (digital); 978-1-9753-6834-0 (print)
6	March 15, 2019	978-4-8030-1283-5	July 27, 2021 (digital); November 19, 2024 (print)	978-1-7183-3324-6 (digital); 978-1-9753-6835-7 (print)
7	September 14, 2019	978-4-8030-1337-5	November 3, 2021 (digital); February 18, 2025 (print)	978-1-7183-3326-0 (digital); 978-1-9753-6836-4 (print)
8	February 15, 2020	978-4-8030-1389-4	December 30, 2021 (digital); May 13, 2025 (print)	978-1-7183-3328-4 (digital); 978-1-9753-6837-1 (print)
9	July 15, 2020	978-4-8030-1434-1	March 16, 2022 (digital); September 16, 2025 (print)	978-1-7183-3330-7 (digital); 978-1-9753-6838-8 (print)
10	December 16, 2020	978-4-8030-1482-2	May 18, 2022 (digital); January 27, 2026 (print)	978-1-7183-3332-1 (digital); 978-1-9753-6839-5 (print)
11	June 16, 2021	978-4-8030-1528-7	July 22, 2022 (digital); May 12, 2026 (print)	978-1-7183-3334-5 (digital); 978-1-9753-6840-1 (print)
12	December 15, 2021	978-4-8030-1595-9	November 30, 2022 (digital); October 13, 2026 (print)	978-1-7183-3336-9 (digital); 978-1-9753-6841-8 (print)
13	September 15, 2022	978-4-8030-1657-4	February 20, 2023 (digital); March 9, 2027 (print)	978-1-7183-3338-3 (digital); 978-1-9753-7403-7 (print)
14	March 15, 2023	978-4-8030-1764-9	December 15, 2023 (digital)	978-1-7183-3340-6 (digital)
EX	February 15, 2024	978-4-8030-1910-0	December 18, 2024 (digital)	978-1-7183-0718-6 (digital)

=== Manga ===
A manga adaptation, titled My Instant Death Ability Is So Overpowered, No One in This Other World Stands a Chance Against Me! —AΩ—, illustrated by Hanamaru Nanto began serialization in Comic Earth Star on March 30, 2018. As of January 2026, the series' individual chapters have been collected into thirteen tankōbon volumes.

In July 2021, J-Novel Club announced that they also licensed the manga adaptation for English publication. At Anime NYC 2022, J-Novel Club announced that the manga adaptation would also be released in print by Yen Press.

==== Volumes ====
No.	Original release date	Original ISBN	English release date	English ISBN
1	August 16, 2018	978-4-8030-1219-4	September 28, 2021 (digital); June 20, 2023 (print)	978-1-7183-4920-9 (digital); 978-1-9753-6842-5 (print)
2	March 12, 2019	978-4-8030-1276-7	November 17, 2021 (digital); September 19, 2023 (print)	978-1-7183-4921-6 (digital); 978-1-9753-6843-2 (print)
3	September 12, 2019	978-4-8030-1334-4	February 9, 2022 (digital); December 12, 2023 (print)	978-1-7183-4922-3 (digital); 978-1-9753-6844-9 (print)
4	May 12, 2020	978-4-8030-1415-0	June 1, 2022 (digital); April 16, 2024 (print)	978-1-7183-4923-0 (digital); 978-1-9753-6845-6 (print)
5	December 11, 2020	978-4-8030-1474-7	August 3, 2022 (digital); July 23, 2024 (print)	978-1-7183-4924-7 (digital); 978-1-9753-6846-3 (print)
6	August 12, 2021	978-4-8030-1547-8	December 1, 2022 (digital); October 15, 2024 (print)	978-1-7183-4925-4 (digital); 978-1-9753-6847-0 (print)
7	February 10, 2022	978-4-8030-1614-7	February 24, 2023 (digital); January 21, 2025 (print)	978-1-7183-4926-1 (digital); 978-1-9753-6848-7 (print)
8	December 12, 2022	978-4-8030-1722-9	November 20, 2023 (digital); June 24, 2025 (print)	978-1-7183-4927-8 (digital); 979-8-8554-0557-6 (print)
9	August 10, 2023	978-4-8030-1821-9	December 29, 2024 (digital); November 25, 2025 (print)	978-1-7183-4928-5 (digital); 979-8-8554-2383-9 (print)
10	February 9, 2024	978-4-8030-1904-9	February 14, 2025 (digital); April 28, 2026 (print)	978-1-7183-4929-2 (digital); 979-8-8554-3554-2 (print)
11	September 12, 2024	978-4-8030-2005-2	July 2, 2025 (digital); February 23, 2027 (print)	978-1-7183-4930-8 (digital); 979-8-8554-4725-5 (print)
12	June 12, 2025	978-4-8030-2136-3	January 14, 2026 (digital)	978-1-7183-4931-5
13	January 9, 2026	978-4-8030-2136-3	October 7, 2026 (digital)	978-1-7183-4932-2

=== Anime ===
An anime television series adaptation was announced on December 1, 2022. It was produced by Okuruto Noboru and written and directed by Masakazu Hishida, with character designs handled by Sayuri Sakimoto, and music composed by Hanae Nakamura, Tatsuhiko Saiki, Kanade Sakuma, and Daisuke Kadowaki. The series aired from January 5 to March 22, 2024, on Tokyo MX and other networks. (Note: Tokyo MX and BS11 list the series premiere on January 4 at 24:30, which is effectively January 5 at 12:30 a.m. JST.) The opening theme song is "Killer Bars", performed by Hilcrhyme, while the ending theme song is "Haze", performed by Anna Suzuki. Sentai Filmworks licensed the series and will be streaming it on Hidive. Muse Communication licensed the series in Southeast Asia.

==== Episodes ====
No.	Title (Note: All English titles are taken from HIDIVE.)	Directed by (Note: Information is taken from the ending credits of each episode.)	Written by	Storyboarded by	Original release date
1	"Instant Death Cheat"; Transliteration: "Sokushi Chīto" (Japanese: 即死チート)	Masakazu Hishida	Jō Aoba	Masakazu Hishida	January 5, 2024
Yogiri Takatou finds himself and his classmates unexpectedly transported to a fantastical world during a school trip. Uniquely, he slept through the ceremony that endowed his peers with magical abilities from a sage, leaving him and Tomochika Dannoura behind as sacrificial distractions for a dragon, due to their lack of powers. However, Yogiri reveals his own extraordinary ability: the power to cause instant death with a mere thought. This episode introduces Yogiri's journey in this new realm, highlighting his unassuming yet overwhelming strength that effortlessly dispatches a formidable dragon. This sets the stage for a story filled with humor and the adventures of an overpowered protagonist in an unfamiliar world.
2	"My Guardian Angel is So Overpowered, This Other World is a Piece of Cake!"; Transliteration: "Watashi no Shugo Rei ga Saikyō Sugite, Isekai Datte Saikyōdesu!" (Japanese: 私の守護霊が最強すぎて、異世界だって最強です！)	Masakazu Hishida	Jō Aoba	Akiko Nakano	January 12, 2024
3	"The World Isn't So Kind as to Allow One-Sided Attacks"; Transliteration: "Ippō Teki ni Kōgeki Dekiru Hodo Yononaka Aamakunai" (Japanese: 一方的に攻撃できるほど世の中甘くない)	Keisuke Warita	Jō Aoba	Keisuke Warita	January 19, 2024
4	"The Fact That You're Watching This Video..."; Transliteration: "Kono Eizō o Omae ga Miteiru Toiu Koto wa" (Japanese: この映像をお前が見ているということは)	Yoshihisa Matsumoto	Jō Aoba	Yoshihisa Matsumoto	January 26, 2024
5	"Alpha Omega"; Transliteration: "Arufa Omega" (Japanese: AΩ)	Masakazu Hishida	Jō Aoba	Masakazu Hishida	February 2, 2024
6	"I'm Not So Rude as to Complain After Being Saved"; Transliteration: "Tasukeraretoite Monku o iu Hodo Yabo Janai Desuyo" (Japanese: 助けられといて文句を言うほど 野暮じゃないですよ)	Jiro Fujimoto	Jō Aoba	Masakazu Hishida, Hayato Yamanaka	February 9, 2024
7	"Standard Opening of Gate Number One Confirmed"; Transliteration: "Daiichi-mon no Jōji Kaihō o Kakunin" (Japanese: 第一門の常時開放を確認)	Masakazu Hishida	Jō Aoba	Masakazu Hishida, Keisuke Warita	February 16, 2024
8	"The Agency"; Transliteration: "Kikan" (Japanese: 機関)	Masakazu Hishida	Jō Aoba	Masakazu Hishida	February 23, 2024
9	"It's Like a Class Full of People Who Only Want to Save Themselves"; Transliteration: "Jibun Dake Tasukaritai Isshin no Kurasu tte Kanjiyone" (Japanese: 自分だけ助かりたい一心のクラスって感じよね)	Yoshihisa Matsumoto	Jō Aoba	Yoshihisa Matsumoto	March 1, 2024
10	"A Woman from the Past Appeared. Tomochika is Shocked to Her Core..."; Transliteration: "Mukashi no Onna ga Arawareta. Tomochika wa Odoroki Tomado tte Iru......" (Japanese: むかしのおんながあらわれた。ともちかはおどろきとまどっている......)	Jiro Fujimoto	Jō Aoba	Jiro Fujimoto	March 8, 2024
11	"Phase 2"	Kotaro Matsunaga	Jō Aoba	Maskazu Hishida	March 15, 2024
12	"You Should Use Your Power Any Way You Want"; Transliteration: "Jibun no Sukina Yō ni Chikara o Tsukaebaī Ndayo" (Japanese: 自分の好きなように力を使えばいいんだよ)	Masakazu Hishida	Jō Aoba	Masakazu Hishida	March 22, 2024

== See also ==
- The Expression Amrilato, a visual novel featuring character designs by Chisato Naruse
- Kaze no Stigma, a light novel series illustrated by Hanamaru Nanto
- Magic Stone Gourmet: Eating Magical Power Made Me the Strongest!, another light novel series illustrated by Chisato Naruse
