= Wash It All Away (manga) =

Japanese manga series

- First tankōbon volume cover, featuring Wakana Kinme

綺麗にしてもらえますか。 (Kirei ni Shite Moraemasu ka)
- Genre: Slice of life
- Manga
- Written by: Mitsuru Hattori
- Published by: Square Enix
- English publisher: NA: Square Enix Manga & Books
- Imprint: Young Gangan Comics
- Magazine: Young Gangan
- Original run: July 7, 2017 – June 2, 2023
- Volumes: 12
- Anime television series
- Directed by: Kenta Ōnishi
- Written by: Touko Machida
- Music by: Eri Chichibu
- Studio: Okuruto Noboru
- Licensed by: Crunchyroll
- Original network: AT-X, Tokyo MX, ABC TV, SBS, BS Asahi
- Original run: January 5, 2026 – March 23, 2026
- Episodes: 12
- icon

Wash It All Away (Japanese: 綺麗にしてもらえますか。, Hepburn: Kirei ni Shite Moraemasu ka) is a Japanese manga series written and illustrated by Mitsuru Hattori. It was published in Square Enix's seinen manga magazine Young Gangan from July 2017 to June 2023, with its chapters collected in 12 tankōbon volumes. An anime television series adaptation produced by Okuruto Noboru aired from January to March 2026.

== Plot ==
A beautiful young woman named Wakana Kinme runs the laundry service "Kinme Cleaning" in the calm and idyllic seaside town of Atami. Both Wakana and her shop are well beloved among the townsfolk, as she takes her work seriously and tackles each cleaning job with passion. Two years ago, Wakana had mysteriously lost her memory for some unknown reason. With no recollection of her previous life, she dedicates herself to her work, believing that each of her customer's items and the memories associated with them must be handled with the utmost care.

== Characters ==
Wakana Kinme (金目綿花奈, Kinme Wakana)
Voiced by: Sayumi Suzushiro
A kind young woman who runs the Kinme Cleaning laundry service in Atami. She has amnesia, having mysteriously forgotten who she was prior to starting her job.
Kyusho Ishimochi (石持毬祥, Ishimochi Kyūshō)
Voiced by: Shūichirō Umeda
The son of an innkeeper who is a regular customer of Kinme Cleaning. He attends high school, and has a soft spot for Wakana, though he usually does not show it.
Nairo Katakuchi (片口那色, Katakuchi Nairo)
Voiced by: Konomi Inagaki
The daughter of a first-time customer of Kinme Cleaning. An elementary school student who likes drawing, she takes an interest in Wakana's occupation as a laundress.
Moruda Wakasagi (鰙守大, Wakasagi Moruda)
Voiced by: Kento Shiraishi
Kyusho's friend from school. He views Wakana as an ideal older sister, and is jealous of the attention she gives to Kyusho instead of him, implying he has a crush on her.
Kuriru Wakasagi (鰙久里留, Wakasagi Kuriru)
Voiced by: Yoshino Aoyama
A tomboyish high school girl, and Moruda's older fraternal twin sister. She goes to the same school as her brother and Kyusho, but does not keep her living space tidy.
Asami Yagara (矢柄麻美, Yagara Asami)
Voiced by: Ami Koshimizu
The first-known regular customer of Kinme Cleaning; Wakana sees her as a friend. She is married and rides a bicycle. It is later revealed that she plays volleyball and is Nairo's homeroom teacher.
Aji (安治)
Voiced by: Wasabi Mizuta
The elderly landlady of Kinme Cleaning's premises, and sometimes a customer. She knows that her previous tenant was also a laundry service.

== Media ==
=== Manga ===
Written and illustrated by Mitsuru Hattori, Wash It All Away was first published in Square Enix's seinen manga magazine Young Gangan from July 7, 2017, to June 2, 2023. Square Enix collected its chapters in ten tankōbon volumes, released from March 24, 2018, to August 25, 2023. The manga continued with one-shot chapters published sporadically since December 15, 2023. An eleventh volume was released on December 25, 2025. A twelfth volume was released on March 25, 2026.

The manga is licensed in North America by Square Enix Manga & Books, with the first volume released on April 22, 2025.

==== Volumes ====
No.	Original release date	Original ISBN	English release date	English ISBN
1	March 24, 2018	978-4-7575-5674-4	April 22, 2025	978-1-64609-374-8
1. "Leave It to Kinme" (金目にお任せ下さい, Kinme ni o Makase Kudasai); 2. "Can I Ask You to Clean This?" (キレイにしてもらってもいいスか？, Kirei ni Shite Moratte mo Īsuka?); 3. "Proud of Our Free-Flowing Hot Spring" (源泉掛け流しが自慢だからさー, Gensen Kakenagashi ga Jiman Dakara sā); 4. "I'll Do Everything You Say!" (なんでも言うこと聞きますからっ!!, Nandemo iu Koto Kikimasu Kara!!); 5. "I'm in the Middle of Work, So..." (今は仕事中ですので......っ, Ima wa Shigotochū Desu Node......); 6. "Promise Me!" (約束ですっ, Yakusoku Desu); 7. "(Closed Today)" (（本日、定休日です。）, (Honjitsu, Teikyūbi Desu)); Bonus Manga (おまけ, Omake)
2	October 25, 2018	978-4-7575-5896-0	June 17, 2025	978-1-64609-375-5
8. "Trust Kinme on This" (金目からのお願いですっ, Kinme Kara no Onegai Desu); 9. "We Need These in Two Days" (明後日 本番なのに......, Asatte Honban Nanoni......); 10. "Please Don't Push Yourself Too Hard" (無理しないで下さい, Muri Shinaide Kudasai); 11. "For Me Too" (私にとっても..., Watashi ni Tottemo...); 12. "This Should Be My First Time" (はじめてのはずなのに..., Hajimete no Hazunanoni...); 13. "I Will Go with You" (那色も一緒に行きますね, Nairo mo Issho ni Ikimasu ne); 14. "(Boom Ba Boom)" (（ドン、ドドン）, (Don, Dodon)); Bonus Manga (おまけ, Omake)
3	May 25, 2019	978-4-7575-6137-3	August 19, 2025	978-1-64609-376-2
15. "Just Show 'Em What You Got!" (アッピールしていけばいいんです!!, Appīru Shite Ikeba Ī n desu!!); 16. "No! That's Not Okay!" (よくありませんっ, Yoku Arimasen); 17. "That Was Sooo Amazing" (みごとすぎますぅ, Migoto Sugimasu); 18. "This Is My First Time...I Think" (私たぶん...初めてです..., Watashi Tabun...Hajimete Desu...); 19. "Power's Out" (...停電, ...Teiden); 20. "I'll Stay Just a Bit Longer" (もうちょっと居ます, Mō Chotto Imasu); 21. "Oops" (あっ, Ah); Bonus Manga 1 (おまけ①, Omake 1); Bonus Manga 2 (おまけ②, Omake 2)
4	December 25, 2019	978-4-7575-6447-3	October 14, 2025	978-1-64609-377-9
22. "As Tough as It Gets!" (トップクラスの手強さなんです！, Toppu Kurasu no Tegowasa Nan Desu!); 23. "W-We Have...Some, Uhh..." (う...う......家って...あのっ, U...U...Ie tte...Ano...); 24. "Gotta Stop by My Gramps's" (じーちゃんとこ寄ってくから, Jīchan Toko Yotteku Kara); 25. "Ahh Well, Living Alone" (まぁ～～あ 一人ってーのは, Mā ～ a Hitori tte no wa); 26. "This Little One Deserves That Much" (この子のためにも───, Kono Ko no Tame ni mo───); 27. "About This Month's Rent..." (今月のお家賃..., Kongetsu no o Yachin...); 28. "Ah, Yes" (はい, Hai); Bonus Manga (おまけ, Omake)
5	July 22, 2020	978-4-7575-6768-9	December 16, 2025	978-1-64609-378-6
29. "Is She Allowed to Set Up a Tent There?" (テント広げていいのかな..., Tento Hirogete Ī no Kana...); 30. "My First Ever" (ワタシのハジメテ, Watashi no Hajimete); 31. "Splish" (ぷしっ, Pushi); 32. "So...Today's the Day" (今日...だったんだ..., Kyō...Datta nda...); 33. "My Papi Is Very, Very..." (祖父はと───っても, Sofu wa to───tte mo); 34. "Yes!" (ぐっ, Gutsu); 35. "A Little Spell?" (オマジナイッテ...？, Omajinai tte...?); Bonus Manga (おまけ, Omake)
6	February 25, 2021	978-4-7575-7110-5	February 17, 2026	978-1-64609-379-3
36. "I Really Do Love This" (やっぱりいいなぁ..., Yappari Ī Nā...); 37. "Oooh!" (あ───!!, A ───!!); 38. "This Is Just Me Talking to Myself" (ひとりごとだと思って, Hitorigoto da to Omotte); 39. "Three...Two...One..." (Note: This chapter is titled "3...2...1..." in the Japanese version.); 40. "They All Gather in This Small Town" (この小さな街に集まるから, Kono Chīsana Machi ni Atsumaru Kara); 41. "This Transition–It's Amazing!" (いいですよ！この流れ......!!, Ī Desu yo! Kono Nagare......!!); 42. "My Shop?" (当店...？, Tōten...?); Bonus Manga (おまけ, Omake)
7	September 25, 2021	978-4-7575-7487-8	April 21, 2026	978-1-64609-439-4
43. "Shio" (糸織ちゃん, Itōri-chan); 44. "Me?" (私......？, Watashi......?); 45. "I Thought It Was Awfully Cold" (寒いと思ったら..., Samui to Omottara...); 46. "Of Course It Is!" (アリですっ, Ari Desu!); 47. "I Gotta Do That Thing" (アレまだ..., Are Mada...); 48. "But I Can't Resist" (やっちゃうんですよね───..., Yatchau ndesu yo ne ───...); 49. "This Is the Life!" (最っ高ォ～～, Saikooo～～); Bonus Manga (おまけ, Omake)
8	April 25, 2022	978-4-7575-7892-0	June 16, 2026	978-1-64609-440-0
50. "I'm a Total Novice" (ペーペーなんだけどねー, Pēpē nan da Kedo Nee); 51. "I Really Love My Hometown" (っぱり地元好きだし～, Yappari Jimoto Suki da Shi); 52. "Aaah!" (ふわあぁぁあ, Fuwaaaa); 53. "Your Shop's Third Anniversary" (3周年だね～, Sanshūnen da ne～); 54. "I Hope You Are Well" (お元気ですか, Ogenki Desu ka); 55. "Teach Me" (おせーて───, Oseete───); 56. "Chirrr..." (ジィ───..., Jī───...); Bonus Manga (おまけ, Omake)
9	November 25, 2022	978-4-7575-8270-5	August 18, 2026	978-1-64609-441-7
57. "Parts of It Seem Different Somehow" (何か違うような...？, Nani ka Chigau Yōna...?); 58. "Want to Watch?" (見たい？, Mitai?); 59. "You're from Kinme Cleaning" (キンメクリーニング様ですね, Kinme Kurīningu-sama Desu ne); 60. "Not Very Exciting" (地味ですね, Jimi Desu ne); 61. "I'll Be Wearing This for the Demo" (これを着て実演します, Kore o Kite Jitsuen Shimasu); 62. "B-DMP B-DMP B-DMP" (ドキドキドキ, Doki Doki Doki); 63. "Ack!" (ひゃあ!!, Hyaa!!); Bonus Manga (おまけ, Omake)
10	August 25, 2023	978-4-7575-8736-6	October 20, 2026	978-1-64609-442-4
64. "A Memory You Talked About" (何回かお話してくれたよね, Nankai ka o Hanashi Shite Kureta yo ne); 65. "I Had a Change in Outlook Recently" (ココロの変化...とかはあったかな..., Kokoro no Henka...Toka wa Atta Kana...); 66. "Hee Hee... Hee Hee Hee!" (ふふっふふふ～～, Fufu Fu Fu Fu～～); 67. "Gatunk Gatunk" (（タタン タタン）, (Tatan Tatan)) (Note: Stylized in all caps); 68. "Finally" (やっと..., Yatto...); 69. "That's Good Enough" (十分なのですから, Jūbun na no Desu Kara); 70. "What's for Dinner Tonight?" (今晩のおかずはなんですかー？, Konban no Okazu wa Nan Desu ka?); 71. "Come On In" (いらっしゃい, Irasshai)
11	December 25, 2025	978-4-30100-235-2	December 8, 2026	979-8-89910-041-3
1. Itsumo Itteru jan (いつも言ってるじゃん); 2. ......Nantonaku (......なんとなく); 3. Nani Koko!? (なにココ───!?); 4. Tokashite Yuku...... (溶かしてゆく......); 5. Kawaranai Mono (変わらないもの); Bonus Manga (おまけ, Omake)
12	March 25, 2026	978-4-30100-337-3	—	—
6. Un, Un (うん、うん); 7. Hekkishi (へっきし); 8. Kinme-san no Omise tte (金目さんのお店って); 9. Nna Koto... (んなこと...); 10. Sorekara (それから)

=== Anime ===
An anime television series adaptation was announced by Happinet in June 2025. It was produced by Okuruto Noboru and directed by Kenta Ōnishi, with series composition and screenplays handled by Touko Machida, characters designed by Azuma Tozawa, and music composed by Eri Chichibu. The series aired from January 5 to March 23, 2026, on AT-X, Tokyo MX and other networks. The opening theme song is "Kirei" (綺麗。; 'Beautiful/Clean'), performed by Yū, while the ending theme song is "Wakaba no Koro" (若葉のころ; 'Youthful Days'), performed by Natsumi Kiyoura.

Crunchyroll is streaming the series.

==== Episodes ====
No.	Title	Directed by	Written by	Storyboarded by	Original release date
1	"You Can Count on Kinme"; Transliteration: "Kinme ni o Makase Kudasai" (Japanese: 金目にお任せください)	Kenta Ōnishi	Touko Machida	Kenta Ōnishi	January 5, 2026
Wakana Kinme operates a laundry shop, opening for the day after personally returning clean clothes to a customer. During business hours, a regular customer, the married Asami Yagara, visits. After closing, Wakana attends a bathhouse, greeting the same customer who had been waiting for her shop to open that day. The following day, she goes on a morning run before opening. She is visited by Aji, the elderly owner of her rented premises. In the afternoon, high school student Kyusho Ishimochi enters; Wakana recognizes him as the son of an innkeeper who is also a regular client. After returning the laundry from his mother, Wakana notices a scratch on his shoe and polishes both pairs. When rain begins to fall as Kyusho prepares to leave, Wakana lends him her umbrella and agrees to clean his schoolbag at a later time.
2	"We're Proud of Our Natural Hot Spring"; Transliteration: "Gensen Kakenagashi ga Jiman Dakara" (Japanese: 源泉掛け流しが自慢だから)	Tatsuya Sasaki	Touko Machida	Tatsuya Sasaki	January 12, 2026
As part of her evening deliveries, Wakana visits the Ishimochi Inn to return laundry and retrieve the umbrella she lent to the innkeeper's son, Kyusho. Persuaded by the innkeeper, she tries the inn's natural hot spring before proceeding to the roof where Kyusho is working. There, she reveals she has amnesia and remembers only the past two years. On a separate day, a first-time customer and her daughter, Nairo, visit the shop after a recommendation. Nairo observes Wakana's work but her request to help is declined; Wakana explains she must first learn to care for her own clothes, as they become treasures of memory. Later, Wakana visits a gift shop owned by Nairo's grandmother, discovering Nairo imitated her grandmother's voice to request cleaning for her late grandfather's fishing banner. Wakana agrees to examine the banner's condition and accepts a portion of dried fish before leaving. That evening, she encounters both Nairo and her grandmother at her usual bathhouse.
3	"(We Are Closed for the Day.)"; Transliteration: "(Honjitsu, Teikyūbi Desu.)" (Japanese: （本日、定休日です。）)	Tsutomu Murakami	Kouki Kitamura	Tsutomu Murakami	January 19, 2026
Kyusho comes across the laundry shop after school, noticing that it has not yet opened for business. He is persuaded by one of the regular customers to climb up a nearby tree and check on Wakana from outside her balcony. Kyusho finds out that Wakana overslept after a hangover from a dinner party the previous night, which Asami had invited her to. On a subsequent day in which she distributes flyers advertising a discount for her laundry service, Wakana visits the foot bath near Atami Station and talks to a stranger, finding out from the stranger's photograph what the station used to look like. Later that night, while watching the sky, Wakana has a fleeting memory of how she ended up at Atami. At some point, Asami reveals that she plays volleyball, and invites Wakana to practice with her.
4	"A Special Request from Kinme"; Transliteration: "Kinme Kara no Onegai Desu" (Japanese: 金目からのお願いですっ)	Ken Kiyota	Touko Machida	Hiroaki Yoshikawa	January 26, 2026
Wakana notices a high school student almost miss her train before the buttons eventually pop off the latter's blouse. Wakana helps the girl, named Kuriru Wakasagi, fix her buttons back at the next station. She then visits Kuriru's apartment. Unimpressed by Kuriru's untidiness and habits, Wakana gives advice and even teaches Kuriru how to sew. She also finds out that Kuriru's fraternal twin brother Moruda is friends with Kyusho. On a subsequent day, Wakana learns about an upcoming float parade that Nairo, Kuriru, Moruda, Kyusho and his mother will all be participating in. Wakana helps find the parade outfits in the community center, which have been stained with mold due to a leak in the ceiling. She immediately decides to clean them, with Kyusho arriving after his shift at the inn to suggest to Moruda and Kuriru that the three of them help her out.
5	"I Have a Feeling..."; Transliteration: "Watashi ni Tottemo..." (Japanese: 私にとっても...)	Madoka Yaguchi	Touko Machida	Kenta Ōnishi	February 2, 2026
With the help of Kyusho, Kuriru and Moruda, Wakana cleans the parade outfits and returns them to their intended wearers on the night before the float parade. The following day, Wakana concludes her business hours early in order to attend the parade as a spectator. At the end of the procession, Kyusho invites Wakana onto their float, only for Wakana to lose her balance, fall off, and land on Kyusho in a way that cause their faces to make contact.
6	"Pop, Pop, Boom"; Transliteration: "(Don, Dodon)" (Japanese: （ドン、ドドン）)	Tatsuya Sasaki	Touko Machida	Tatsuya Sasaki	February 9, 2026
As part of a pickup requested by one of Atami's more traditional inns, Wakana is tasked with cleaning a doll that the innkeeper had bought a long time ago for her daughter. While cleaning the doll, Wakana seems to recall taking on a similar job more than two years ago. After a morning swim the following day, Wakana passes by the inn of Kyusho's mother and is tasked with another laundry job. After her work concludes, Wakana goes to a diner with Asami and talks about what happened during the float parade, and suspects Kyusho is avoiding her as a result. Asami assures her that their ordeal will pass with time. The conversation is overheard by Kuriru, who is working part-time as a waitress at said diner. All three of them watch the fireworks over Atami later that night.
7	"You Should Leverage Your Assets!!"; Transliteration: "Appīru Shite Ikeba Ī n desu!!" (Japanese: アッピールしていけばいいんです!!)	Yuki Iwasaki	Touko Machida	Yuki Iwasaki	February 16, 2026
Sumiyaki, a supplier for Wakana's laundry shop, suggests that she should promote her business on social media. When Wakana admits her inexperience with the internet, Nairo and her friends, who are also visiting Wakana, help her set up a social media account. Once she cleans a hat that belongs to a famous influencer, Wakana receives cleaning requests from across the country. Despite being overwhelmed thanks to her sudden popularity, Wakana notices Kyusho pass by and eventually follows him to the shopping district, having remembered his request to clean his schoolbag.
8	"That Was Too Impressive"; Transliteration: "Migoto Sugimasu" (Japanese: おみごとすぎますぅ)	Hideaki Uehara	Touko Machida	Hideaki Uehara	February 23, 2026
At a different bathhouse after work, Wakana quickly resolves a commotion caused by spilled coffee. The person responsible, a location scout named Uka Hatsuayu, immediately becomes an admirer, and passes by Wakana's laundry shop on another day. When Wakana catches Uka following her around, the shy Uka replies that she wants to improve her communication skills. After one conversation, Uka gains enough confidence to improve her inter-personal handling. Uka later invites Wakana to go on a photoshoot with her on the nearby island of Hatsushima; Wakana is only persuaded when the publication in charge of the photoshoot offers free publicity of her business in exchange. Once the photoshoot is over with, Wakana wanders the island in search of her memories, and almost misses the last return ferry of the day to Atami.
9	"Power's Out"; Transliteration: "...Teiden" (Japanese: ...停電)	Shintarō Itoga	Touko Machida	Alan Smithee & Hiromi Kazama	March 2, 2026
Kyusho and Kuriru take shelter at Wakana's laundry shop due to the rain outside. Kuriru leaves before the weather worsens and causes a power outage, which forces Wakana to suspend her business. While Wakana does remember to return Kyusho's schoolbag, which is now clean, Kyusho offers to stay for longer, having noticed Wakana's fear of thunder. A fallen branch proceeds to damage the awning outside due to lightning striking a nearby tree. Power is restored late at night forcing Wakana to resume business; when it concludes, Wakana realizes that her work took up one of the spare rooms, causing her to ask Kyusho to sleep in the same room as her. Before they sleep, Wakana expresses her worries over losing more of her recent memory.
10	"A Top-Class Challenge!"; Transliteration: "Toppu Kurasu no Tegowasa Nan Desu!" (Japanese: トップクラスの手強さなんです！)	Hiromi Kazama	Touko Machida	Hiromi Kazama	March 9, 2026
The day after the lightning strike, Wakana is tasked by Asami with removing what appears to be an insoluble stain on her clothes caused by calligraphy ink. Upon redelivery, Wakana finds out that Asami is Nairo's homeroom teacher. On a subsequent day, before she opens for business, Wakana is invited to a meal with Uka at her home. The presence of two big dogs in Uka's household appears to unlock more of Wakana's memories.
11	"To Help This Little Guy Out"; Transliteration: "Kono Ko no Tame ni mo" (Japanese: この子のためにもー)	Tatsuya Sasaki	Touko Machida	Tatsuya Sasaki	March 16, 2026
Kyusho is instructed by his mother to visit his grandfather's grave after school. He decides to visit the nearby shrine after doing so, and on the way, passes by Wakana, who is flush with embarrassment after a gust blows up her skirt. On a subsequent day, when visiting Wakana at her laundry shop, Nairo wonders about the locked hatch on the floor. Wakana sees a storage space under the hatch with various items that the previous tenants had left behind. Among them is a stuffed toy that has collected mold, which Wakana decides to clean and return to its owner. Wakana and Nairo then discover that the intended address for the stuffed toy no longer exists.
12	"Local Cleaning with a Heart"; Transliteration: "Chiiki ni Nezashita Magokoro Sābisu o" (Japanese: 地域に根ざしたまごころサービスを)	Kenta Ōnishi	Touko Machida	Kenta Ōnishi	March 23, 2026
On the day Wakana is supposed to pay her rent for the month, Aji appears to take offense at one of Wakana's remarks involving her clothes, and leaves the laundry shop without collecting the rent. After her business concludes for the day, Wakana decides to visit Aji at her home, eventually finding her hunched over at the door of a closet. After she recovers, Aji admits that she should have visited a doctor. On a subsequent day, Wakana is called up by Asami as a fill in for the latter's volleyball team. As a result, she helps the team win. Afterwards, on Wakana's second business anniversary, her regular customers gather at the laundry shop to present Wakana with several gifts, including a couple of anniversary cakes.
