= Even Given the Worthless "Appraiser" Class, I'm Actually the Strongest =

Japanese light novel series

- First light novel volume cover

不遇職【鑑定士】が実は最強だった～奈落で鍛えた最強の【神眼】で無双する～ (Fugūshoku "Kanteishi" ga Jitsu wa Saikyō Datta: Naraku de Kitaeta Saikyō no "Shingan" de Musō Suru)
- Genre: Adventure, fantasy, harem
- Novel series
- Written by: Ibarakino
- Published by: Shōsetsuka ni Narō
- Original run: December 14, 2019 – January 4, 2022
- Light novel
- Written by: Ibarakino
- Illustrated by: Hitaki Yuu
- Published by: Kodansha
- Imprint: Kodansha Ranobe Books
- Original run: October 2, 2020 – present
- Volumes: 4
- Manga
- Written by: Ibarakino
- Illustrated by: Morohoshi Fuji
- Published by: Kodansha
- English publisher: NA: Kodansha USA (digital)
- Imprint: Shōnen Magazine Comics
- Magazine: Magazine Pocket
- Original run: July 29, 2020 – April 9, 2025
- Volumes: 16
- Anime television series
- Directed by: Kenta Ōnishi
- Written by: Touko Machida
- Music by: Satoshi Hōno; Kaori Nakano
- Studio: Okuruto Noboru
- Licensed by: Crunchyroll (streaming); SEA: Muse Communication
- Original network: Tokyo MX, BS11, AT-X, TVh
- Original run: January 9, 2025 – March 27, 2025
- Episodes: 12
- icon

Even Given the Worthless "Appraiser" Class, I'm Actually the Strongest (不遇職【鑑定士】が実は最強だった～奈落で鍛えた最強の【神眼】で無双する～, Fugūshoku "Kanteishi" ga Jitsu wa Saikyō Datta: Naraku de Kitaeta Saikyō no "Shingan" de Musō Suru) is a Japanese light novel series written by Ibarakino and illustrated by Hitaki Yuu. It was serialized online from December 2019 to January 2022 on the user-generated novel publishing website Shōsetsuka ni Narō. It was later acquired by Kodansha, who have published four volumes since October 2020 under their Kodansha Ranobe Books imprint. A manga adaptation with art by Morohoshi Fuji has been serialized online via Kodansha's Magazine Pocket website since July 2020 and has been collected in sixteen tankōbon volumes. The manga is licensed digitally in North America by Kodansha USA. An anime television series adaptation produced by Okuruto Noboru aired from January to March 2025.

== Plot ==
In a fantasy world similar to a role-playing game, Ein is a boy who was mistreated and mocked for being assigned the Appraiser job, which is considered weak. One day, his party is surrounded by a pack of monsters, and they abandon him to save themselves. Wounded and unable to escape the dungeon, he jumps off of a cliff, but awakens with his injuries healed underneath a Yggdrasil tree, which is located in an even more dangerous dungeon. Yuri, the Yggdrasil's spirit, quickly grows attached to Ein and has her guardian, Ursula, care for him; they grant him a magical Spirit's Eye, and begin training him in combat so he will be strong enough to return to the surface. After reaching this goal, Ein and Yuri go on a journey so that Yuri can meet her sisters, the other Yggdrasil spirits.

== Characters ==
Ein (アイン, Ain)
Voiced by: Kikunosuke Toya (Japanese); Nazeeh Tarsha (English)
The main character, a young boy with the "appraiser" class, abandoned in a dungeon, saved by Yuri and trained by Ursula.
Yūri (ユーリ)
Voiced by: Hikaru Tono (Japanese); Reshel Mae (English)
The spirit of one of the World Trees who saved Ein, and who appears as a young blond-haired elf maiden.
Ursula (ウルスラ, Urusura)
Voiced by: Sayumi Suzushiro (Japanese); Katie Wetch (English)
Yuri's guardian, who acts like her mother.
Pina (ピナ)
Voiced by: Yū Serizawa (Japanese); Leo Mathews (English)
Another World Tree spirit and a sister to Yuri.
Kurohime (黒姫)
Voiced by: Minami Tsuda
Pina's guardian, who appears as a turtle.
Alice (アリス, Arisu)
Voiced by: Kana Ichinose (Japanese); Abigail Blythe (English)
Another World Tree spirit and librarian.
Akahane (朱羽)
Voiced by: Aimi (Japanese); Emi Lo (English)
Alice's guardian.
Jasper (ジャスパー, Jasupā)
Voiced by: Takeo Ōtsuka (Japanese); Jamie Snowden (English)
Head of the Ginoh Trading Guild who becomes a friend to Ein.
Zoid (ゾイド, Zoido)
Voiced by: Daisuke Namikawa (Japanese); Trey Upton (English)
The leader of the group which betrayed Ein and left him to die in the dungeon.
Echidna (エキドナ, Ekidona)
Voiced by: Kana Hanazawa (Japanese); Maganda Marie (English)
The original World Tree which spawned the other eight.

== Media ==
=== Light novel ===
Written by Ibarakino, Even Given the Worthless "Appraiser" Class, I'm Actually the Strongest was serialized on the user-generated web novel publishing site Shōsetsuka ni Narō from December 14, 2019, to January 4, 2022. It was later acquired by Kodansha who began publishing it as a light novel with illustrations by Hitaki Yuu under their Kodansha Ranobe Books light novel imprint on October 2, 2020. Four volumes have been released as of February 2025.

No.	Release date	ISBN
1	October 2, 2020	978-4-06-520918-9
2	May 2, 2022	978-4-06-524580-4
3	July 2, 2024	978-4-06-536481-9
4	February 28, 2025	978-4-06-538966-9

=== Manga ===
A manga adaptation illustrated by Morohoshi Fuji was serialized on Kodansha's Magazine Pocket website and app from July 29, 2020, to April 9, 2025. The first tankōbon volume was released on November 9, 2020. The manga's chapters have been compiled into sixteen tankōbon volumes as of June 2025.

On September 30, 2021, Kodansha USA announced that they licensed the series for English digital publication. Kodansha is also publishing the series in English on their K Manga service.

No.	Original release date	Original ISBN	North American release date	North American ISBN
1	November 9, 2020	978-4-06-521572-2	October 26, 2021	978-1-63-699478-9
2	March 9, 2021	978-4-06-522646-9	December 28, 2021	978-1-63-699520-5
3	July 9, 2021	978-4-06-524038-0	January 25, 2022	978-1-63-699527-4
4	November 9, 2021	978-4-06-525992-4	April 26, 2022	978-1-68-491145-5
5	March 9, 2021	978-4-06-527277-0	August 30, 2022	978-1-68-491416-6
6	July 8, 2022	978-4-06-528385-1	December 27, 2022	978-1-68-491605-4
7	November 9, 2022	978-4-06-529640-0	April 25, 2023	978-1-68-491900-0
8	March 9, 2023	978-4-06-530924-7	August 22, 2023	979-8-88-933104-9
9	July 7, 2023	978-4-06-532177-5	December 26, 2023	979-8-88-933299-2
10	November 9, 2023	978-4-06-533513-0	April 30, 2024	979-8-88-933449-1
11	March 8, 2024	978-4-06-534874-1	September 3, 2024	979-8-89-478005-4
12	July 9, 2024	978-4-06-536119-1	January 7, 2025	979-8-89-478309-3
13	November 8, 2024	978-4-06-537420-7	May 6, 2025	979-8-89-478519-6
14	January 8, 2025	978-4-06-538059-8	September 23, 2025	979-8-89-478687-2
15	March 7, 2025	978-4-06-538717-7	December 23, 2025	979-8-89-478807-4
16	June 9, 2025	978-4-06-539747-3	March 24, 2026	979-8-89-830037-1

=== Anime ===
An anime television series adaptation was announced on June 26, 2024. It is produced by Okuruto Noboru and directed by Kenta Ōnishi, with scripts written by Touko Machida, characters designed by Sayuri Sakimoto, and music composed by Satoshi Hōno and Kaori Nakano. The series aired from January 9 to March 27, 2025, on Tokyo MX and BS11. The opening theme song is "Crescendo", performed by Asterism, while the ending theme song is "Rock wa Shinanai" (ロックは死なない; Rock Will Never Die), performed by 22/7. Crunchyroll streams the series. Muse Communication licensed the series in Southeast Asia.

==== Episodes ====
No.	Title	Directed by (Note: Production staff information is taken from the ending credits of each episode.)	Written by	Storyboarded by	Chief animation directed by	Original release date
1	""Appraiser" Is A Worthless Class"; Transliteration: "Kantei-shi wa Fugū-shoku" (Japanese: 鑑定士は不遇職)	Tatsuya Sasaki	Tōko Machida	Hiroaki Yoshikawa	Sayuri Sakimoto	January 9, 2025
Ein is employed as a supporter by the adventurers Zoid and Jolene who treat him terribly and call him "trash picker". In this world, people are granted Jobs by the Goddess of Light and Skills by the Goddess of Darkness ranked as either Low Common, High Common, or Rare. Ein has the job Appraiser and his skill is Low Common, so the High Common adventurers Zoid and Jolene see no issue casually abusing him. In the labyrinth, they find a valuable dead Hellhound which Ein harvests, but as they find more dead Hellhounds Ein starts to worry what killed them. Zoid and Jolene are blinded by greed until they end up surrounded by the stronger Hellhound pack that killed the others. Caring only about themselves, they sacrifice Ein. With no choice except be eaten or commit suicide, Ein jumps from a nearby cliff, regretting that he never accomplished anything. He awakens uninjured among the roots of a World Tree, legendary sources of mana that disappeared centuries ago. Unseen, a young woman watches him leave to explore the area. Immediately, he encounters S-rank monsters that begin tearing him apart, until a mysterious person saves him. Awakening back at the tree with his injuries healed, Ein meets the young woman.
2	"Super Appraise with My Spirit Eye"; Transliteration: "Seirei no Me de Chō-kantei" (Japanese: 精霊の目で超鑑定)	Yūki Nomura	Tōko Machida	Hiroaki Yoshikawa	Azuma Tozawa	January 16, 2025
Ein learns the woman is Yuri, the World Tree Spirit. Ursula, her Guardian and adopted mother, explains they had to replace his damaged eye with part of the World Tree, a Spirit Eye. Yuri has developed a crush on him; of all the adventurers she saved he was the only one who showed gratitude instead of stealing her valuable leaves. As they cannot leave Yuri's physical tree for long, Ursula decides to train Ein until he can escape the labyrinth by himself. Ein learns his Spirit Eye has made Appraisal more powerful and given him new skills. Using Appraisal, Ein learns to dodge and attack by anticipating an opponents moves. Ursula gives him a sword made from Yuri's tree and he defeats multiple S-rank monsters. His new eye also lets him learn opponents powers so he gains increased speed and strength. By appraising Ursula, he also learns magic and her ability Discard Incantation, which lets him use magic without reciting spells. After a month, Ursula lets him get revenge on the monster that took his eye, an S-rank Death Bear.
3	"Revenge Match"; Transliteration: "Ribenji Matchi" (Japanese: リベンジマッチ)	Kenya Ueno	Yoshikazu Tominaga	Hiroaki Yoshikawa	Sayuri Sakimoto	January 23, 2025
Ursula upgrades his eye into the Spirit God Eye using Yuri's spirit core, allowing Yuri to manifest from his eye. She also gifts him an inter-dimensional storage space, a Spirit Katana and a Philosopher's Stone mentally linking him to Ursula. Yuri reveals her greatest wish is to see her eight sister trees in other labyrinths. Ein defeats the dungeon boss so Ursula uses the Labyrinth Heart to level up his God Eye again. In the city, Zoid claims Ein died saving him and Jolene. Ein appears and exposes their lies, ruining their reputation. In the forest, Ein saves Jasper, head of the Ginoh Trading Guild, and his guest Princess Claudia from monsters. Claudia falls for Ein so Yuri jealously claims she is Ein's wife. Claudia decides to become Ein's second wife one day, to his shock. He is further shocked when Jasper asks to become his husband. Jasper has guessed Ein's eye is a spirit core and explains the original World Tree exhausted its power sealing Demon Lord Miktoran and left behind only 9 World Tree Cores. Ein refuses his proposal but becomes his friend. Jasper reveals his research has revealed the potential location of other World Trees.
4	"Searching for the Sisters"; Transliteration: "Shimai o Sagashi te" (Japanese: 姉妹を探して)	Tatsuya Sasaki	Tōko Machida	Tatsuya Sasaki	Sayuri Sakimoto	January 30, 2025
Yuri's sister Pina refuses to see them until they have defeated the dungeon she built herself. Secretly, it is impossible to die in her dungeon as victims are simply teleported outside, so she plans to humiliate Ein in front of Yuri. However, Ein avoids all Pina's traps and defeats her monsters. Zoid learns Jolene blamed him for everything and joined a new party with her reputation intact. To regain his reputation he desperately decides to defeat a monster alone, which coincidentally is in Pina's dungeon. Ein saves him and has him sent outside. Ein confronts the dungeon boss, a giant tortoise. However, he exposes this as an illusion and finds the tortoise is a tiny baby, the offspring of Black Tortoise, one of the Four Holy Beasts of Creation. As it is a baby, he convinces Pina that exposing the illusion counts as "defeating it." Yuri is thrilled to see Pina again. The baby tortoise transforms into Kurohime, Pina's World Tree Guardian. Kurohime adds Pina's spirit core and her Philosopher Stone to Ein's eye so they can travel with him too, which also levels up his eye again. Ein hopes they can find Yuri's remaining sisters soon. Zoid can't believe he was saved by a "trash-picker" like Ein.
5	"Behemoth Subjugation Request"; Transliteration: "Behīmosu Tōbatsu Irai" (Japanese: ベヒーモス討伐依頼)	Ken Kiyota	Yoshikazu Tominaga	Hiroaki Yoshikawa	Sayuri Sakimoto & Azuma Tozawa	February 6, 2025
Jasper helps Ein sell his loot, since no one would believe he killed monsters without Jasper's endorsement. This draws attention from Guild Master Meegan. Kurohime explains to Ein that there are actually 9 World Trees, not 8, as the original World Tree that withered still exists somewhere as the eldest sister Echidna. Meegan asks Ein to defeat Behemoth, an SS Class dragon created by Demon Lord Miktoran. Ursula locates Behemoth in the desert. As he is immune to magic, Ein is forced to rely only on his sword and non-magic abilities. Having never been defeated Behemoth underestimates Ein as just another human, until Ein blows his skull apart. Having grown bored of living Behemoth accepts his death and congratulates Ein on a splendid victory. Ein finds himself feeling sorry for Behemoth who was created by Miktoran to only be a murderous monster. For his victory, Claudia introduces Ein to her father, the King, who recognizes Ein's kind heart and is happy for Ein to marry Claudia one day. He also gifts Ein a pocket watch engraved with the Royal Seal, indicating he may go wherever he pleases with the full authority of the royal family. As Ein's fame spreads, Zoid's resentment grows. He is suddenly approached by a spirit who offers to help him achieve his desire, and introduces herself as Echidna.
6	"VS. Zoid"; Transliteration: "Bāsasu Zoido" (Japanese: VS. ゾイド)	Yūki Nishihata	Tōko Machida	Yūki Nishihata	Sayuri Sakimoto & Azuma Tozawa	February 13, 2025
Ein is tormented by dreams that remind him he survived only by getting lucky. He awakens depressed that his powers were given to him by his friends, but at heart he is still a Low Common. Echidna offers Zoid his own Spirit Eye and he goes on a rampage, starting with murdering Jolene. Echidna directs him to kill Yuri and Pina so Ein will lose his powers. Ein, Ursula, and Kurohime arrive just in time. Ein faces Zoid alone but struggles to reconcile his desire not to kill Zoid with his desire to get revenge for Zoid's abuse. Zoid claims deep down Ein is as evil as he is. Yuri and the others help Ein realize he is strong even on his own. This realization turns Ein into a Spirit Guardian, which had been Ursula's plan all along. Ein easily destroys his Spirit Eye, returning Zoid to normal. Zoid is furious Ein beat him again, but after seeing how much Ein has changed he decides to become a better man himself and allows himself to be arrested. Ein is curious who gave Zoid a Spirit Eye, and why. Echidna removes Zoid's memory of her and retrieves the recording she made of Ein's combat capabilities. As she departs, it is revealed she is working towards resurrecting Miktoran.
7	"The Girl of the Forbidden Library"; Transliteration: "Kinsho-ko no Shōjo" (Japanese: 禁書庫の少女)	Jarrett Martin	Yoshikazu Tominaga	Jarrett Martin	Sayuri Sakimoto & Azuma Tozawa	February 20, 2025
Ein is shocked when Yuri asks to kiss him, with Ursula unwillingly revealing it is required to become Yuri's Guardian. Yuri tries to kiss him, but Ein accidentally kisses her forehead instead. Echidna visits her ally Demon Baron Falco and convinces him to assassinate Ein. However, Ein easily kills him. Ein requests access to the Forbidden Library, accessible only to royalty. Entering the library, Ein is separated from Yuri and Ursula by a barrier and is forced to meet Alice the Librarian alone. Alice reveals she herself is a World Tree Spirit, along with her Guardian Akahane. Akahane explains the Library is actually inside their dungeon that Ein teleported to when he entered the door in the royal palace. In exchange for guarding the books, Alice is allowed to live in the palace in peace, but if she leaves via the door, or Yuri enters via the door, her contract with the royal family will be cancelled. Therefore, for Yuri and Alice to see each other Ein must locate the dungeon out in the world and conquer it the normal way. After Ein leaves, Alice realizes she fell in love with him at first sight. Ein locates the dungeon and quickly reaches Alice. Pina quickly realizes Alice is in love with Ein and gleefully causes chaos by accusing Ein of cheating on Yuri. Ein is dumbfounded when everyone becomes mad at him.
8	"Nigun's Shadow"; Transliteration: "Nigun no Kage" (Japanese: ニグンの陰)	Tatsuya Sasaki	Tōko Machida	Hiroaki Yoshikawa	Sayuri Sakimoto & Azuma Tozawa	February 27, 2025
Alice is determined to be with Ein, but he takes her confession to mean she wants to stay close to her sisters. Ursula adds Alice's spirit core and Akahane's philosopher stone to Ein's eye. The King himself asks Ein to destroy demons in the Rayshik territories. In Rayshik, the villagers prepare to sacrifice a young girl named Mia to the SS-Rank dragon Hydra, but Mia's father changes his mind. Ein arrives just in time, annihilates Hydra and steals his skill to create poisons and medicines. Ein is surprised the villagers are more scared of Rayshik's Lord Nigun than they were of Hydra. Ein meets Nigun who panics when Ein reveals he already killed Hydra. Nigun reveals he made a deal with Hydra to sacrifice women to him in exchange for keeping monsters away. Ein is furious, but Nigun points out he made a difficult choice to sacrifice a few in order to save hundreds. Ein is unsure which the right decision is. Nigun speaks to Demon Viscount Shadow, Hydra's master, who demands Nigun kill Ein. With Hydra gone, monsters destroy Rayshik's farms. Ein restores the destroyed crops and fabricates a stone wall around Rayshik to keep monsters out. Ein's optimism reminds the villagers of Nigun's deceased father, who did his best for Rayshik while Nigun seems determined to destroy it. The monsters prepare to attack them again.
9	"Rise to Action"; Transliteration: "Kekki" (Japanese: 決起)	Jarrett Martin	Tōko Machida	Jarrett Martin	Sayuri Sakimoto	March 6, 2025
Ein destroys the monster army alone, requiring Yuri to heal his exhaustion afterwards. Having watched Ein save their lives twice now, Mia's father rallies the villagers to finally stand up to Nigun. Nigun appears at that moment and accuses Ein of being a demon, tricking the villagers into thinking he cares about them so he can steal Rayshik. Nigun is shocked when the villagers agree Ein should be their Lord, since all Nigun talks about protecting is the land when he should be protecting the people, like his father. In his despair, Nigun calls out to Shadow for help. Inside his head, Shadow helps him remember that he was a sickly child rejected by the village children in case they got sick. He was also beset by rumours he wasn't his father's legitimate son. Sensing his weakness, Shadow became his only friend. Then, when his father grew ill, Shadow tricked Nigun into giving him poison to drink instead of medicine, slowly killing him over several years. Once Nigun became Lord, Shadow began slowly taking over his mind and selling some villagers into slavery in the demon realm without Nigun even knowing. Realizing Shadow is actually a demon who tricked him into murdering his own father, Nigun goes insane, allowing Shadow to fully possess his body. Shadow introduces himself to Ein as a Demon Viscount, Shadow the Enticer.
10	"Nigun's Darkness"; Transliteration: "Nigun no Yami" (Japanese: ニグンの闇)	Yūki Nishihata	Yoshikazu Tominaga	Yūki Nishihata	Sayuri Sakimoto	March 13, 2025
Shadow attacks, confident Ein can't kill him without killing Nigun. He also summons demons to attack the villagers. Ein calls out to Nigun to wake up but Shadow brags Nigun sealed himself inside his own despair and can't hear him. Shadow is stunned when Ein knocks him down with a head butt, allowing Nigun to hear Ein's voice. Mia's father rallies the villagers to fight the demons themselves. Nigun escapes his despair long enough to stab himself in the heart while tearfully confirming Shadow was always his best friend. Uncaring, Shadow abandons Nigun to die but once separated, Ein kills Shadow instantly. Ein and Yuri heal Nigun. At first Nigun is angry Ein didn't let him die, but the villagers insist Nigun atone by living with what he did. An even smaller Shadow separates from the body Ein killed, but he is caught by Pina and Alice. Shadow reveals all demons have been ordered to assassinate Ein, but his confession triggers a curse that kills him before he can reveal his master's identity. Nigun confesses to his crimes and is imprisoned, but requests the King make Ein the new lord of Rayshik. The King agrees and Ein panics when Claudia reveals possessing a noble title has brought them another step closer to marriage. Alice despairs that she might only end up as Ein's fourth wife.
11	"The Demon Ioana"; Transliteration: "Mazoku Ioana" (Japanese: 魔族イオアナ)	Kenta Ōnishi	Tōko Machida	Jarrett Martin	Sayuri Sakimoto	March 20, 2025
The deaths of Falco and Shadow come to the attention of Demon Duke Ioana. Echidna assures her Ein is more valuable than he seems. Ioana decides to test Ein herself and at Echidna's suggestion goes to fetch one of the World Tree Spirits Ein hasn't found yet. After she leaves, Echidna gleefully hopes Ioana will help Ein grow even stronger. Ein is astonished when the spirit of Yuri's sister Kursh appears before them and reveals the tree of their other sister May in the Abysswood is being attacked by demons. She also reveals May's Guardian was killed long ago, so she has been acting as May's Guardian. Ein quickly reaches Abysswood, a secret above-ground dungeon disguised as a forest. Ein is accosted by Demon Count Hornet the Indestructible, who avoids death by hiding her soul in a single hornet somewhere within a swarm of millions. Ein destroys the swarm and Hornet attempts to flee, but is killed by Ioana for her cowardice. Ein hits Ioana with Drain Level to weaken her, so she attempts to use an unblockable bullet to kill Ein, but he parries it perfectly and cuts off her head. Ioana still lives, so Ein reveals he didn't use Drain Level only once, but hundreds of times, so Ioana is now even weaker than the monsters of the Abysswood. Furious, Ioana teleports her head to safety. Ein locates Kursh at May's tree and discovers May, as the youngest sister, is a toddler in the middle of her afternoon nap.
12	"Happiness, Forever"; Transliteration: "Shiawaseyo, Towa ni" (Japanese: 幸せよ、永遠(とわ)に)	Tatsuya Sasaki	Tōko Machida	Hiroaki Yoshikawa	Sayuri Sakimoto	March 27, 2025
May decides she wants to travel with everyone. Kursh decides the same and gives Ein both her and May's spirit cores. In return, Ein leaves a copy of himself to guard May's tree. Ursula adds the cores to his eye, granting him Kursh's power of Emptiness, which can erase objects from existence, and May's power of Tree Creation. He also becomes able to appraise people's aura. His katana becomes imbued with Smite Evil, which absorbs power from enemies. Echidna gathers a council of demon nobility and reports that Ein is now powerful enough to interfere with them reviving the Demon Lord, so he must die. Ein is granted ownership of Nigun's castle and manages to organize the sisters and guardians into spring cleaning. While cleaning the library, Ein talks about his love of books, which Alice mis-hears as a love confession, and become so flustered she creates a hurricane, causing more mess. Ursula is happy Yuri is becoming a capable woman the more time she spends with Ein. The girls discover a room filled with women's clothing and decide to throw a costume party. In particular, Ein is entranced by Yuri in a white gown. After all night dancing, Yuri can't wait to find her four remaining sisters. Ein confirms he is happier than he has ever been just spending time with his new friends and will try his best to make sure it never ends.

== See also ==
- The Otome Heroine's Fight for Survival, another light novel series with the same illustrator
