= Tsubomi (magazine) =

Japanese manga magazine

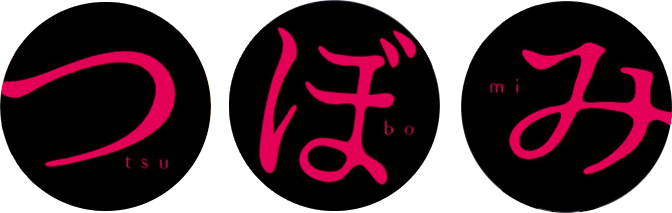

- Cover of the December 2012 issue of Tsubomi
- Categories: Yuri manga
- Frequency: Quarterly (2009–2010); Bimonthly (2010–2012)
- Publisher: Houbunsha
- First issue: February 12, 2009
- Final issue: December 12, 2012
- Country: Japan
- Language: Japanese

Tsubomi (Japanese: つぼみ) was a Japanese yuri manga magazine published by Houbunsha. It was published from February 2009 to December 2012 and had a total of 21 issues.

== Authors ==
- Mitsuru Hattori
- Hiro Hoshiai
- Izumi Kazuto
- Tatsumi Kigi
- Akira Kizuki
- Aki Kudō
- Yuka Miyauchi
- Fūka Mizutani
- Milk Morinaga
- Nawoko
- Hidari Ōgawa
- Megane Ōtomo
- Hiroki Ugawa (Koburiawase)
- Nodoka Tsurimaki
- Atsushi Yoshinari
- Akihito Yoshitomi (Sisterism)
- Kenn Kurogane (Hoshikawa Ginza Yonchōme)
