= Monster-Colored Island =

Japanese manga series

- First tankōbon volume cover

かいじゅう色の島 (Kaijū-iro no Shima)
- Genre: Coming-of-age; Fantasy; Yuri
- Manga
- Written by: Mitsuru Hattori
- Published by: Fujimi Shobo
- English publisher: NA: Yen Press
- Imprint: Dragon Comics Age
- Magazine: Young Dragon Age
- Original run: September 25, 2018 – present
- Volumes: 2

Monster-Colored Island (かいじゅう色の島, Kaijū-iro no Shima; lit. 'Monster-Colored Island' or 'Scheelite-Colored Island') is a Japanese manga series written and illustrated by Mitsuru Hattori. It began serialization in Fujimi Shobo's Young Dragon Age manga magazine in September 2018.

== Plot ==
Kon Chigawa is a lonely girl who has never left the island she was raised on. One day, she meets a city girl named Furuka Hitoto on a cliff, and resuscitates her after falling off of it. After regaining consciousness, the two spot a cave that is rumored to be the home a monster, and decide to enter it.

== Characters ==
Kon Chigawa (千川棔, Chigawa Kon)
Voiced by: Nao Tōyama (PV)
Furuka Hitoto (一門歩流夏, Hitoto Furuka)
Voiced by: Sumire Uesaka (PV)

== Media ==
=== Manga ===
Written and illustrated by Mitsuru Hattori, Monster-Colored Island began serialization in Fujimi Shobo's Young Dragon Age manga magazine on September 25, 2018. The series' chapters have been collected into two tankōbon volumes as of March 2024.

During their panel at Sakura-Con 2025, Yen Press announced that they had licensed the series for English publication.

No.	Original release date	Original ISBN	English release date	English ISBN
1	March 9, 2021	978-4-04-074015-7	October 28, 2025	979-8-8554-1408-0
Chapters 1–10
2	March 8, 2024	978-4-04-075362-1	May 26, 2026	979-8-8554-1410-3
Chapters 11–19

=== Other ===
An animated promotional video commemorating the release of the first volume was released on the Kadokawa YouTube channel on March 5, 2021. The video was animated by Seven Arcs and directed by Shinpei Tomooka, with characters designed by Yūta Kiso.
