= Sankarea: Undying Love =

Japanese manga series

- First tankōbon volume cover, featuring Rea Sanka

さんかれあ (Sankarea)
- Genre: Romantic comedy, zombie
- Manga
- Written by: Mitsuru Hattori
- Published by: Kodansha
- English publisher: NA: Kodansha USA
- Magazine: Bessatsu Shōnen Magazine
- Original run: December 9, 2009 – September 9, 2014
- Volumes: 11
- Anime television series
- Directed by: Shinichi Omata (Note: Credited under the pseudonym Mamoru Hatakeyama)
- Produced by: Nobumitsu Urasaki; Kensuke Tateishi; Masashi Takatori; Yūka Sakurai; Yasuhiro Yamaguchi; Yoshiaki Uraki
- Written by: Noboru Takagi
- Music by: Yukari Hashimoto
- Studio: Studio Deen
- Licensed by: Crunchyroll: UK: MVM Films
- Original network: TBS
- Original run: April 5, 2012 – June 28, 2012
- Episodes: 12 + 3 OVA
- Novel

Sankarea: All Night-Rea Long
- Written by: Ryō Suzukaze
- Illustrated by: Mitsuru Hattori
- Published by: Kodansha
- Imprint: Kodansha Ranobe Bunko
- Published: July 2, 2013
- icon

Sankarea: Undying Love (Japanese: さんかれあ, Hepburn: Sankarea) is a Japanese manga series written and illustrated by Mitsuru Hattori. The manga was serialized in Kodansha's Bessatsu Shōnen Magazine between December 2009 and September 2014 and compiled in eleven tankōbon volumes. The story follows Chihiro Furuya, a zombie and occult enthusiast in modern Japan, who meets Rea Sanka, a girl who becomes a zombie after drinking an experimental "reanimation potion" made from bigleaf hydrangeas.

The series has been licensed and is published in North America by Kodansha USA. An anime television adaptation by Studio Deen aired from April to June 2012. A novel adaptation by Ryō Suzukaze was published in July 2012.

== Plot ==
Chihiro Furuya is a male high school student with a keen interest in zombies, collecting zombie-related videogames, film and manga, and even to the point of desiring to "kiss a zombie girl". Following the death of his pet cat, Babu, he attempts to revive it using an old manuscript, which describes the process of creating a reanimation potion. At this time, he encounters a girl named Rea Sanka, who has run away from home. In a suicide attempt, she drinks a sample of the reanimation potion which is created from the poisonous bigleaf hydrangea, although she survives. Following an argument with her father, she falls from a cliff by accident and dies. However, as a result of the potion, she becomes a zombie who eats bigleaf hydrangea leaves to survive. The story follows the life of Chihiro and Rea as his new "zombie girlfriend".

== Characters ==
=== Main characters ===
Chihiro Furuya (降谷 千紘, Furuya Chihiro)
Voiced by: Ryōhei Kimura (Japanese); Aaron Dismuke (English)
Chihiro, a student fascinated by necromancy, discovers an old manuscript and creates a potion to resurrect his deceased cat as a zombie. While researching in an abandoned building, he encounters Rea, who mourns her life at a nearby well. He vows responsibility if she becomes a zombie. After she moves in, he studies her condition in a tent within his room. Though initially desiring his first kiss from a zombie, he later develops genuine feelings for Rea. After she bites him, he temporarily turns into a half-zombie. His mother, once briefly reanimated, may have influenced his obsession. Ultimately, Rea consumes his heart, but he survives with an artificial replacement.
Rea Sanka (散華 礼弥, Sanka Rea)
Voiced by: Maaya Uchida (Japanese); Tia Ballard (English)
Rea is a teenage girl who consumes Chihiro's experimental zombie potion in a suicide attempt following years of abuse by her father. Though the potion does not immediately kill her, she becomes a zombie after a fatal fall caused by her father. She subsequently lives with Chihiro, seeking independence from her past. Unlike typical zombies, she exhibits unusual self-control in advanced stages of zombification, possibly due to ingesting the potion before death. Her physical strength increases as her reanimated body bypasses natural biological limits. After suffering memory loss from brain deterioration, she fully regains her memories upon consuming Chihiro's heart.
Ranko Saōji (左王子 蘭子, Saōji Ranko)
Voiced by: Sayuri Yahagi (Japanese); Jamie Marchi (English)
Ranko is Chihiro's cousin, often referred to by him as "Wanko", though she occasionally insists on the more formal suffix "-san". Her romantic feelings for Chihiro stem from an incident in childhood when he protected her from a dog. She develops a competitive yet teasing relationship with Rea regarding Chihiro's affections. After confessing her feelings, Ranko recognizes Chihiro's preference for Rea but continues to harbor hope, sometimes taking extreme measures such as consuming what she believes to be resurrection pills—an attempt that fails when the pills prove to be mislabeled medication. Her persistence remains despite the unreciprocated nature of her affection.
Mero Furuya (降谷 萌路, Furuya Mero)
Voiced by: Yuka Iguchi (Japanese); Felecia Angelle (English)
Mero is Chihiro's younger sister, named after filmmaker George Romero. While her brother studies zombies, she maintains a fascination with ghosts. Her memories of her mother are fragmented, recalling only bandaged hands and an inability to perceive temperature. These partial recollections lead her to subconsciously associate Rea with her mother, occasionally addressing Rea as such. The connection stems from Rea's zombified state and physical deterioration, which mirrors Mero's faint memories of her mother's condition.

=== Furuya family ===
Jogorō Furuya (降谷 茹五郎, Furuya Jogorō)
Voiced by: Shirō Saitō (Japanese); Mike McFarland (English)
Jogorō, known as Professor Boil, is the grandfather of Chihiro and Mero and creator of the reanimation potion. A former respected zombie researcher in the United States, he abandoned his work for unknown reasons. Now senile, he retains extensive knowledge of zombies but rarely communicates coherently. His confusion leads him to mistake Rea for his first wife Sada from the Meiji period, though others dismiss these claims as dementia. His condition stems from prolonged poison exposure, though brief moments of clarity allow him to advise Chihiro on preserving Rea's consciousness. He reveals the potion's imperfection—it merely delays, rather than halts, her eventual decay.
Do'on Furuya (降谷 呶恩, Furuya Doōn)
Voiced by: Seiro Ogino (Japanese); Christopher Corey Smith (English)
Chihiro and Mero's father and also the priest at the Shiryō-ji temple.
Yuzuna Furuya (降谷 柚菜, Furuya Yuzuna)
Voiced by: Yurika Hino (Japanese); Caitlin Glass (English)
Yuzune is the deceased mother of Chihiro and Mero. Following a fatal car accident, evidence suggests Jogorō temporarily revived her as a zombie. Mero's fragmented memories depict Yuzune with bandaged hands and an inability to sense temperature—traits mirroring Rea's zombified state, which triggers these recollections. The flashbacks imply Yuzune eventually succumbed to typical zombie behavior, likely due to developing a hunger for human flesh. Her final act was voluntarily separating from her family before complete expiration, though the exact circumstances remain unclear.
Babu (ばーぶ, Bābu)
Voiced by: Misato Fukuen (Japanese); Monica Rial (English)
Babu is Chihiro's reanimated pet cat who died in a car accident. As a zombie, his physical capabilities exceed normal feline limits, allowing him to overpower larger predators. Unlike living cats, his movements are no longer governed by biological constraints. While currently docile toward humans, he exhibits increasing nocturnal predatory behavior toward other animals. His condition demonstrates the inevitable progression of zombification—initial preservation of personality followed by gradual mental deterioration and eventual loss of control. Babu's degeneration mirrors Rea's potential fate, though she maintains greater self-control. His case provides Chihiro critical data on the limitations of the resurrection process and the need for further research to prevent complete mental degradation.

=== Other characters ===
Dan'ichirō Sanka (散華 団一郎, Sanka Dan'ichirō)
Voiced by: Unshō Ishizuka (Japanese); David Wald (English)
Dan'ichirō is Rea's controlling father who exhibits obsessive behavior toward his daughter, including extensive surveillance and inappropriate photography under the pretext of documenting her growth. His fixation appears connected to Rea's resemblance to her deceased mother, who died in childbirth. A skilled fencer, Dan'ichirō initially resents Chihiro's relationship with Rea but ultimately acknowledges him as her protector, albeit with strict conditions regarding their conduct. Following this confrontation, he departs for the United States to research methods of halting Rea's physical deterioration. His actions reflect a complex psychological profile combining grief, possessiveness, and distorted paternal affection.
Aria Sanka (散華 亜里亜, Sanka Aria)
Voiced by: Mayumi Asano (Japanese); Lydia Mackay (English)
Aria is Rea's stepmother and Dan'ichirō's wife, formerly a maid trained under the Sanka family's tradition of grooming select staff as potential spouses. Despite this preparation, Dan'ichirō married Rea's mother instead, only wedding Aria after his first wife's death in childbirth. Their marriage remains strained as Dan'ichirō focuses exclusively on Rea. As chairwoman of Rea's school, Aria maintains a professional demeanor but privately resents her stepdaughter. Her attempts to gain Dan'ichirō's attention prove unsuccessful, and she develops alcohol dependence. After learning of Rea's condition, she unsuccessfully propositions Chihiro, who rejects her advances while stating his exclusive attraction to the undead.
Darin Arciento Kurumiya (来宮・ダリン・アーシェント, Kurumiya Darin Āshento)
Voiced by: Aiko Kusumi (Japanese); Jad Saxton (English)
Darin is Jogorō's former assistant and a researcher for ZoMA, specializing in zombie experimentation. Though less knowledgeable than Jogorō, her reliable mental state makes her a frequent contact for Chihiro and Rea. She initially views Rea as a research specimen, but their relationship evolves as Rea treats her with genuine friendship. Darin's fascination with zombies stems from childhood neglect—her father only acknowledged her during research discussions. She administers controlled zombie-poison doses to enhance her physical capabilities, suppressing pain receptors at the risk of self-injury. Her studies reveal that Rea's partial pre-death potion consumption explains her retained personality, unlike traditional test subjects revived post-mortem.

== Media ==
=== Manga ===
Written and illustrated by Mitsuru Hattori, Sankarea: Undying Love was serialized in Kodansha's Bessatsu Shōnen Magazine from December 9, 2009, to September 9, 2014. Its chapters were collected in eleven tankōbon volumes, published between July 16, 2010, and November 11, 2014. The fifth volume's limited edition was bundled with drama CD, telling an original story.

Kodansha USA licensed the manga for English release in North America. The eleven volumes were released from June 11, 2013, to March 24, 2015.

==== Volumes ====
No.	Original release date	Original ISBN	English release date	English ISBN
1	July 16, 2010	978-4-06-384341-5	June 11, 2013	978-1-61262-351-1
2	December 9, 2010	978-4-06-384412-2	August 27, 2013	978-1-61262-352-8
3	March 9, 2011	978-4-06-384453-5	October 29, 2013	978-1-61262-353-5
4	August 9, 2011	978-4-06-384529-7	December 24, 2013	978-1-61262-354-2
5	February 9, 2012	978-4-06-384623-2; 978-4-06-358382-3 (LE)	February 11, 2014	978-1-61262-398-6
6	June 8, 2012	978-4-06-384682-9; 978-4-06-358389-2 (LE)	April 29, 2014	978-1-61262-399-3
7	November 9, 2012	978-4-06-384762-8; 978-4-06-358390-8 (LE)	June 24, 2014	978-1-61262-550-8
8	June 7, 2013	978-4-06-384873-1; 978-4-06-362253-9 (LE)	August 26, 2014	978-1-61262-554-6
9	January 9, 2014	978-4-06-394977-3	October 21, 2014	978-1-61262-580-5
10	June 9, 2014	978-4-06395-062-5	December 2, 2014	978-1-61262-581-2
11	November 7, 2014	978-4-06-395231-5	March 24, 2015	978-1-61262-802-8

=== Anime ===
A 12-episode anime television series based on the manga was announced in the October 2011 issue of Bessatsu Shōnen Magazine, and aired between April 5 and June 28, 2012. Two original video animation episodes were released with the limited edition of the 6th and 7th volumes of the manga on June 8 and November 9, 2012. A special episode was released with the 6th Blu-ray Disc and DVD volumes on November 30, 2012. The opening theme is "Esoragoto" (絵空事, Figment) by Nano Ripe and the ending theme is "Above Your Hand" by Annabel.

The series has been licensed in North America by Funimation, released the series dubbed in English on Blu-ray Disc and DVD on October 1, 2013. It was then discovered that the release contained the edited version, Funimation has since recalled and postponed a release on Blu-ray/DVD with the uncensored material, no news of a proper release date was announced until Funimation announced a March 31, 2015 release for the uncut complete series. Customers who have received the edited version can opt to return their copy for refund or exchange their copy for the unedited version when it is distributed. MVM Films has licensed the series in the United Kingdom.

==== Episodes ====
No.	Title	Original release date
0 OVA	"Fate is... Really..."; Transliteration: "Unmeitte... Yatsu wa..." (Japanese: 運命って…ヤツは…)	June 8, 2012
Seven months prior to meeting Rea Sanka, Chihiro Furuya accompanies his cousin Ranko Saōji, his sister Mero Furuya and his father Do'on Furuya to the Tōhoku region with the task of organizing his uncle's book collection, which is being donated to a museum. During the journey, a familiar bridge triggers fragmented memories of his late mother Yuzuna Furuya, raising questions about his limited recollection. Meanwhile, Rea endures psychological abuse from her stepmother Aria Sanka following her middle school graduation. While cataloging texts, Chihiro discovers a reanimation manuscript, which he retains despite its dismissed value. After becoming separated from Ranko and Mero during a waterfall excursion, Chihiro accidentally interrupts Rea at an open-air bath, in which their brief encounter results in minor damage to the volume.
1	"Once I... Become a... Zombie..."; Transliteration: "Watashi ga... Zonbi ni... Nattara" (Japanese: 私が…ゾンビに…なったら)	April 5, 2012
Chihiro, a student with a scholarly interest in reanimation phenomena, pursues experimental research using the reanimation manuscript after his pet cat Babu perishes in a traffic collision. His investigations in an abandoned structure bring him into contact with Rea, a teenage girl suffering under severe familial restrictions. When Rea learns that Chihiro has witnessed her private emotional outbursts, she elects to participate in his research. She gradually embraces the theoretical prospect of zombification as liberation from her constrained life, while Chihiro accepts potential custodial obligations for her undead welfare.
2	"It Was... Successful"; Transliteration: "Seikō... Shiteta" (Japanese: 成功…してた)	April 12, 2012
While gathering poisonous bigleaf hydrangeas for Chihiro's reanimation research, Rea reflects on her oppressive upbringing under her father Dan'ichirō Sanka. After Rea collects some plant samples, Chihiro administers the mixture to Babu with no immediate effect, leading Chihiro to abandon his experiments. Unbeknownst to them, the treatment later proves successful when Babu reanimates. When Rea is later faced with renewed punishment from Dan'ichirō, she consumes the stolen formula in a suicide attempt.
3	"Sanka... Rea"; Transliteration: "Sanka... Rea" (Japanese: さんか…れあ)	April 19, 2012
Upon awakening, Rea discovers that she survived her suicide attempt, and she overhears that Dan'ichirō is planning to mutilate Chihiro. Rea escapes to warn Chihiro, while Chihiro pursues the reanimated Babu to a field of bigleaf hydrangeas. Spotting Rea atop a cliff, Chihiro watches as Dan'ichirō confronts her. When Dan'ichirō attempts to strike Babu upon swiftly appearing, Rea intercepts the attack and falls from the cliff, suffering fatal abdominal trauma from a tree branch. Due to the previously ingested reanimation potion, she subsequently reanimates as a zombie.
4	"A Normal... Girl"; Transliteration: "Futsū no... Onnanoko..." (Japanese: 普通の…女の子…)	April 26, 2012
Chihiro conceals Rea in his bedroom, attempting to hide her condition from others. Later on, Chihiro goes out to reconciles with Ranko for previously abandoning her while finding Babu. Meanwhile, Rea briefly encounters Chihiro's grandfather Jogorō Furuya in the bathroom. Upon returning, Chihiro observes Rea entering a disoriented state with evident signs of rigor mortis. This development leads him to recognize the urgent need for preservation measures to prevent her corpse's continued deterioration.
5	"If She's a Zombie... That Means..."; Transliteration: "Zonbitte... Koto wa..." (Japanese: ゾンビって…コトは…)	May 3, 2012
While devising preservation methods for Rea, Chihiro decides to hide her in his closet before having to clean the family temple. Jogorō haphazardly reveals himself as the original creator of the reanimation potion. Meanwhile, Ranko searches for DVDs of zombie movies in Chihiro's bedroom, but she is suddenly attacked by Rea, who exhibits inappropriate physical contact. Chihiro rushes to intervene by separating the two, not long before Rea forcibly kisses him.
6	"It's Because I... Ran Into You"; Transliteration: "Anata ni... Deaeta kara" (Japanese: あなたに…出会えたから)	May 10, 2012
While Chihiro attempts to explain the situation to Ranko, Rea consumes bigleaf hydrangea leaves in a nearby field, which temporarily restores her mental clarity and reverses her rigor mortis. Jogorō informs Chihiro that regular consumption of the bigleaf hydrangea leaves provides only a temporary solution to prevent decomposition. After securing permission from Do'on for Rea to remain in the household, Chihiro initiates systematic documentation of her condition. During an evening walk, Rea pushes Chihiro away from an approaching vehicle, accidentally injuring his elbow in the process. She then demonstrates unusual behavior by licking his wounded elbow with apparent curiosity.
7	"Childhood... Friends..."; Transliteration: "Osana... Najimi..." (Japanese: おさな…なじみ…)	May 17, 2012
While assisting Ranko with her family restaurant deliveries, Chihiro triggers her recollection of their childhood encounter when he protected her from a stray dog on their way back from a video rental shop, an event that shaped both her affection for him and her understanding of his fascination with reanimation. During their present interaction, Ranko initiates but abruptly halts a kiss before departing, privately reaffirming her determination to compete with Rea for Chihiro's attention.
8	"Counterfeit... Freedom..."; Transliteration: "Itsuwari no... Jiyū..." (Japanese: 偽りの…自由…)	May 24, 2012
During Chihiro's ongoing observation sessions with her, Rea requests a visit to the mall, unaware of surveillance by Dan'ichirō's operatives. While Chihiro procures lunch in the food court, Rea encounters Chihiro's classmate Yasutaka, who makes unwelcome advances. The operatives attempt to abduct Rea by the courtyard, but they are overpowered by her enhanced physical capabilities. Adapting their strategy, they capture Chihiro instead and transport him to Dan'ichirō.
9	"A Mother's... Hand..."; Transliteration: "Haha no... Te..." (Japanese: 母の…手…)	May 31, 2012
Mero and her classmates Ichie Shinoda and Miko Yasaka observe their art teacher Mizuki Yamanouchi exhibiting strange behavior, leading them to suspect Yamanouchi to be a zombie. Their investigation reveals that Yamanouchi secretly maintains a pet alligator on school premises. During conversations about undead folklore, Mero recalls fragmented memories of the late Yuzuna, particularly her unnaturally cold hands. While paying respects at Yuzuna’s gravesite, Mero encounters Rea, whose physical characteristics and demeanor evoke strong maternal associations. The resemblance causes Mero to unconsciously project her mother’s identity onto Rea during subsequent interactions.
10	"Strong... Feelings..."; Transliteration: "Tsuyoi... Omoi..." (Japanese: 強い…思い…)	June 7, 2012
Restrained in Dan'ichirō's mansion, Chihiro encounters Aria. She recounts her transition from household maid to Dan'ichirō's second wife, detailing how his affections remained fixed on his first wife, a disabled teenager who died in childbirth. It is also revealed that Dan'ichirō's obsession with Rea stems from her physical resemblance to her deceased mother rather than paternal devotion. During this confrontation, Rea takes a taxi to the estate. Upon receiving Chihiro, Dan'ichirō demonstrates renewed resolve to safeguard Rea, though his protective motives remain entangled with unresolved attachment to his late first wife.
11	"Nothing... Really... Special"; Transliteration: "Tokubetsu... Nanka ja... nai..." (Japanese: 特別…なんかじゃ…ない…)	June 21, 2012
Dan'ichirō engages Chihiro in a fencing duel, while Rea is captured and dressed in a bunny girl outfit by Satsuki and Natsukawa, two members of the household staff. Rea manages to escape by using her enhanced strength. At the duel's climax, Chihiro criticizes Dan'ichirō's paternal failures, provoking a violent response. Though wounded, Chihiro counterattacks as Rea intervenes to block Dan'ichirō's strike. Following Chihiro's arguments about personal autonomy, Dan'ichirō reluctantly accepts Rea's choice to remain with Chihiro, departing for America to research a cure. As Chihiro later recovers in his bedroom, Rea wears a nurse uniform while observing Ranko's possessive behavior toward Chihiro. Rea then recognizes that Ranko has romantic feelings for Chihiro through their interaction.
12	"At That Moment... I..."; Transliteration: "Ano Shunkan... Ore wa..." (Japanese: あの瞬間…俺は…)	June 28, 2012
While Chihiro continues researching preservation methods, Rea develops interest in attending a fireworks festival. When a rainstorm forces this public event to be canceled, Ranko organizes a private display at the family temple. While dressing up Rea in a yukata, Ranko confesses that she has romantic feelings for Chihiro. As Rea prepares to resume schooling, she unexpectedly enters a zombified state and attacks Chihiro, inflicting a lip wound through biting.
13 Special	"I, Too, Am... A Zombie..."; Transliteration: "Wagahai mo... Zonbi Dearu..." (Japanese: 吾輩も…ゾンビである…)	November 30, 2012
Babu observes existence as a reanimated feline. Chihiro worries when Rea attends school for the first time in her undead state, especially upon learning that she relied on her enhanced strength to perform a slam dunk during gym class. Babu forms an attachment to a living female cat but severs contact when his nocturnal hunting urges strengthen. During this period, Darin Arciento Kurumiya, an overseas scientist specializing in reanimation research, arrives in Japan with materials including bigleaf hydrangea leaves, seeking new specimens for her studies.
14 OVA	"Body of a Zombie... Heart of a..." Transliteration: "Mi wa Zonbi ni... Kokoro wa..." (Japanese: 身はゾンビに…心は…)	November 9, 2012
During Dan'ichirō's absence, Aria experiences isolation and falls asleep in her bath. Simultaneously, a silent girl is discovered lying beneath the Furuya family temple. Rea encounters hostility when searching for the girl at dinner, suffering an unexplained fall. The following day, Rea realizes that the bigleaf hydrangea garden is destroyed. At night, Rea witnesses the girl trying to approach Chihiro. When Rea voices her suspicions, the girl self-inflicts injury to implicate Rea. Chihiro supports Rea's claims, which prompts the girl to reveal herself as a young Aria and conjure a hailstorm in the cemetery. These events manifest as Aria's bath-induced dream and Rea's shared hallucination, leaving both of them startled by their overlapping perceptions.

=== Novel ===
A novel adaptation was published by Kodansha under their Kodansha Ranobe Bunko imprint on July 2, 2013. The novel, titled Sankarea: All Night-Rea Long (さんかれあ おーる・ないとれあ・ろんぐ), was written by Ryō Suzukaze and illustrated by Mitsuru Hattori.

== Sales ==
According to Oricon, the third volume of the manga sold 24,363 copies, while the fourth volume sold 44,120 copies.
