= Kenkō Zenrakei Suieibu Umishō =

Japanese manga series

- First tankōbon volume cover

ケンコー全裸系水泳部 ウミショー
- Genre: Romantic comedy
- Manga
- Written by: Mitsuru Hattori
- Published by: Kodansha
- Imprint: Shōnen Magazine Comics
- Magazine: Weekly Shōnen Magazine
- Original run: July 13, 2005 – April 23, 2008
- Volumes: 9
- Anime television series
- Directed by: Kōichirō Sōtome
- Written by: Mamiko Ikeda
- Music by: Yasumasa Satou
- Studio: Artland
- Original network: Tokyo MX, TVS, Chiba TV, TV Aichi, TVO
- Original run: July 4, 2007 – September 26, 2007
- Episodes: 13
- icon

Kenkō Zenrakei Suieibu Umishō (ケンコー全裸系水泳部 ウミショー; lit. 'Healthy All-nude Swim Team Seacats Commerce High') is a Japanese manga series written and illustrated by Mitsuru Hattori. It was serialized in Kodansha's shōnen manga magazine Weekly Shōnen Magazine from July 2005 to April 2008, with its chapters collected in nine tankōbon volumes. A 13-episode anime television series, produced by Artland and directed by Kōichirō Sōtome, was broadcast from July to September 2007.

== Plot ==
Within the Kanagawa prefecture lies the seaside city of Umineko. There, Kaname Okiura, a student in his second year of high school, attends Prefectural Umineko Commercial High School (県立海猫商業高等学校, Kenritsu Umineko Shōgyō Kōtō Gakkō), or Umishō (海商) for short. He is also the manager of the high school swim team though he himself does not know how to swim. In fact, he is afraid of the water stemming from an incident which occurred some years ago. While he was at the beach, he had nearly drowned when a "mermaid" pulled him under the water. He joined the school's swimming club in order to learn how to swim, but the club is filled with weirdos, who do not teach him swimming.

One day, a floating house arrives at the shores of Umishō bearing two persons. One of these is a cheerful, sunny, happy-go-lucky girl named Amuro Ninagawa, a transfer student, and the other is her father. Her incredible swimming speed makes her an instant hit with the swimming club, but Kaname is surprised, as she reminds him of the mermaid he saw only once in his early childhood. After her floating house is destroyed during a storm she moves to Kaname's house.

The fictional island of Onoshima (緒ノ島), where the series is set, is modeled on the real island of Enoshima in Fujisawa, Kanagawa.

== Characters ==
Amuro Ninagawa (蜷川 あむろ, Ninagawa Amuro)
Voiced by: Aki Toyosaki
Amuro Ninagawa is a second-year transfer student at Umishō High School, originally from the Daito Islands in Okinawa. A naturally gifted swimmer accustomed to open-water swimming, she struggles with competitive pool events due to unfamiliarity with regulations and confined spaces—once colliding with the wall mid-race. Her unconventional behavior includes a preference for swimming nude, which she does unselfconsciously, particularly around Kaname Okiura. Despite her raw talent, adapting to structured competitions remains a challenge.
Kaname Okiura (沖浦 要, Okiura Kaname)
Voiced by: Toshiyuki Toyonaga
Kaname Okiura is a second-year student and manager of the Umishō swim team. Traumatized by a childhood encounter with what he describes as a mermaid, he developed a fear of swimming that begins to fade after Amuro Ninagawa's arrival. While frequently exasperated by her unpredictable behavior, he gradually develops romantic feelings for her, though he often denies them.
Momoko Orizuka (織塚 桃子, Orizuka Momoko)
Voiced by: Hitomi Nabatame
Orizuka is a third-year student and vice-captain of the Umishō swim team. As the most disciplined and level-headed member, she frequently serves as the straight man to her teammates' antics, particularly clashing with Ikamasa's irresponsible behavior. Her no-nonsense attitude and strong leadership help maintain order within the team.
Maki Ikuta (生田 蒔輝, Ikuta Maki)
Voiced by: Ai Shimizu
A first-year student at Umishō High School, nicknamed Makio (マキオ). Frequently mistaken for a middle schooler due to her petite stature, she remains a novice swimmer who receives instruction from Kaname Okiura while training with the team.
Masa Ikariya (碇矢 雅, Ikariya Masa)
Voiced by: Makoto Yasumura
The third-year captain of the Umishō swim team, nicknamed Ikamasa (イカマサ). Known for his muscular physique and eccentric behavior, he frequently irritates teammates with his obsession with shaving body hair and preference for revealing swimwear. His antics often disrupt team activities.
Mirei Shizuoka (静岡 みれい, Shizuoka Mirei)
Voiced by: Yukari Fukui
Shizuoka is a second-year student at Umishō High School. While admired for her swimming prowess—having nearly won the Kantō Tournament's 200-meter event—she exhibits paradoxical behavior: intensely self-conscious when observed, yet privately promiscuous, wearing revealing lingerie and collecting phallic objects like kokeshi dolls. This trait mirrors her parents' overt sexuality. Though displaying possible romantic interest in Kaname Okiura, her feelings remain ambiguous. As the granddaughter of the Shizu Group's founder, her background contrasts with her timid demeanor.
Maaya Nanako (魚々戸 真綾, Nanako Maaya)
Voiced by: Sayuri Yahagi
Maaya Nanako is a first-year transfer student, a competitive swimmer and model who joins Umishō to pursue her childhood crush on Kaname Okiura. Viewing Amuro as a romantic rival, she frequently clashes with her. Distinctive for her small fang and custom swimsuit, Maaya resents larger-breasted teammates like Amuro and forms an "Alliance" with Makio to address their shared insecurity about breast size.
Sanae Kise (黄瀬 早苗, Kise Sayane)
Voiced by: Ryōko Shintani
Sanae is a third-year student and co-founder of Umishō's swim team, as well as Momoko Orizuka's childhood friend. Known for her mischievous behavior, she frequently causes trouble for others and fabricates stories both to tease teammates and attract male attention.

== Media ==
=== Manga ===
Written and illustrated by Mitsuru Hattori, Kenkō Zenrakei Suieibu Umishō was serialized in Kodansha's shōnen manga magazine Weekly Shōnen Magazine from July 13, 2005, (Note: The series started in the magazine's 33rd issue of 2005 (cover date July 27), released on July 13 of the same year.) to April 23, 2008. (Note: It finished in the magazine's combined 21st–22nd issue (cover date May 14), released on April 23 of the same year.) Kodansha collected its 129 chapters in nine tankōbon volumes, released from January 17, 2006, to June 17, 2008.

=== Anime ===
A 13-episode anime television series produced by Artland, directed by Kōichirō Sōtome and written by Mamiko Ikeda, aired on Tokyo MX, Television Saitama, Chiba TV, TV Aichi and TV Osaka, from July 4 to September 26, 2007. (Note: Tokyo MX listed the air dates for the series on Tuesday at 26:00, which is effectively Wednesday at 2:00 a.m. JST.) The opening theme is "Dolphin☆Jet" by Ayane, and the ending theme is "Splash Blue ~ Taiyō to Remonēdo" (Splash BLUE〜太陽とレモネード; "Splash Blue: Sun and Lemonade") by Ayumi Murata.

==== Episodes ====
No.	Title	Original release date
1	"Churaumi!"; Transliteration: "Churaumi!" (Japanese: ちゅらうみっ!)	July 4, 2007
On a beach, Okiura Kaname and Kaname Okiura are resting when they notice Amuro Ninagawa boarding a houseboat while carrying a 3-foot-long (0.91 m) shark. She enters and offers the shark to Momoko, who refuses, stating she dislikes dead sharks. Amuro clarifies that the shark is still alive, at which point it suddenly revives in her grip and attempts to bite Momoko, tearing off her swimsuit top instead. Amuro then dives into the ocean, appearing to disappear before resurfacing far into the water moments later. Her display astonishes the onlookers, particularly Momoko.
2	"I Might Be... Interested…"; Transliteration: "Kyōmi... Aru... Kamo..." (Japanese: 興味････ある･･かも･･･)	July 11, 2007
Amuro is introduced to the swim team after Orizuka invites her to join. She meets the other members of Umishō: she mistakes Makio for a middle-school student and openly remarks on Shizuoka's chest size, embarrassing her. Ikamasa introduces himself in his usual awkward manner. The following day, Amuro and a hesitant Kaname walk to school together—they are neighbors—prompting gossip among their classmates. Swim practice proves largely ineffective. The typically reserved Shizuoka repeatedly makes ambiguous remarks to Kaname, which could be misconstrued. Later, while returning home, Amuro unintentionally encounters a rising local celebrity.
3	"I'll Show You!"; Transliteration: "Miseru!" (Japanese: 魅せる!!!)	July 18, 2007
The Umishō team competes in a local tri-meet swim competition but performs poorly, with all the male swimmers finishing last. During Amuro's 50-meter freestyle race, she dominates effortlessly but is disqualified for failing to surface within the required 15 meters, leaving Umishō in last place overall. During a break from school activities, Amuro drags Kaname to the beach—partly to show off her new string bikini—leaving Kaname unsure whether their outing counts as a date. There, they encounter Ikamasa, who is pranking beachgoers while wearing a realistic shark costume and teasingly asks if the two are dating. In a later development, Ikamasa struggles to focus on swim meets as his family's restaurant faces competition from a trendy new eatery. The team devises a plan to attract customers: the female members wait tables in their swimsuits—an idea surprisingly proposed by Shizuoka. Though the tactic proves highly popular with male patrons (much to the girls' discomfort), business booms. However, when Ikamasa and his father push for a second night, their greed risks undermining the scheme.
4	"I'm Going to Show You"; Transliteration: "Misete Agerunda kara" (Japanese: 見せてあげるんだから)	July 25, 2007
After their disappointing performance at the Tri-Meet, vice-captain Orizuka insists the team needs discipline and organizes a training camp. The session quickly devolves into chaos—until Orizuka eats a "poisonous" mushroom from Ikamasa's grill and starts behaving erratically, stripping off her swimsuit. Instead of stopping her, Ikamasa joins in. Post-practice, the girls head to the baths (with Orizuka claiming no memory of the incident), but Shizuoka avoids them, hiding a secret. When she finally bathes alone, the boys nearly catch her—until a storm cuts the power. Meanwhile, part of the team gets stranded at Amuro's house as the storm washes her houseboat (carrying Amuro, Makio, and Orizuka) out to sea.
5	"Do You Want Mine, Too?"; Transliteration: "Atashi no mo hoshii" (Japanese: あたしのもほしい)	August 1, 2007
After their houseboat is destroyed in the storm, Amuro and her father stay with Kaname's family during repairs. Kaname quickly grows frustrated with Amuro's disregard for privacy and modesty. The next morning, they visit a local temple with Amuro's father, who scavenges materials from the shrine itself—much to Kaname's shock. Meanwhile, Shizuoka is revealed to frequent the temple to admire the statuary. She hides when Amuro bursts in, devouring the offerings, but is discovered after misinterpreting a conversation between Amuro and Kaname. Later, Kaname scolds Amuro for her thoughtlessness, prompting her to run off. While searching for her, Kaname learns about Amuro's troubled past from her father. Unable to locate Amuro, Kaname is joined by Orizuka, Makio, and Ikamasa for support.
6	"No!"; Transliteration: "Me!" (Japanese: めっ!)	August 8, 2007
The Ninagawa houseraft repairs progress smoothly. On her way to school, Amuro encounters Maaya Nanako, a model and competitive swimmer. A crowd gathers, including Kaname, who shares a contentious childhood history with Maaya. Now transferred to Umishō, Maaya joins the swim team and quickly demonstrates her skill at manipulating men—though Kaname remains unaffected. At practice, Maaya charms the male teammates while resenting the female members for their more developed figures. She persuades the boys to construct a private changing room for her, which backfires disastrously for the entire team.
7	"Curse"; Transliteration: "Noroi" (Japanese: 呪い)	August 15, 2007
With just one week until the Prefectural tournament, disaster strikes—Amuro loses one of the sacred "X" charms from her headband, given to her by her grandmother with a warning that losing it would bring a curse. Distraught, she becomes unable to function. The charm was blown away during a dive, sending the team on a frantic chase to recover it. After the X lands on Maaya—who spitefully tosses it aside—the team attempts makeshift replacements, all failing. Kaname rallies them to resume the search. During the hunt, Shizuoka stumbles upon something meaningful to her, while Sanae has an unexpected encounter. With options exhausted, they visit a temple seeking divine help to lift Amuro's curse before the competition.
8	"Take a Good Look"; Transliteration: "Yo~ku Mitenasai" (Japanese: よ〜く見てなさい)	August 22, 2007
On the eve of the Prefectural tournament, Orizuka dismisses the team to rest—but Ikamasa lures the boys to the girls' clubroom under false pretenses. His real goal: fulfilling his dream of playing mahjong in their space. Curiosity overcomes them (except Kaname), and they snoop until Orizuka catches them the next morning. At the tournament, Orizuka faces her longtime rival, Shinomiya's Nanjou Karena, who has always defeated her. Though Umishō's girls dominate, winning five straight events, tensions peak when Orizuka, Amuro, and Nanjou meet in the 100m Freestyle finals—where Nanjou proposes a high-stakes wager to spice up the race.
9	"Help Me Forget..."; Transliteration: "Wasuresasete..." (Japanese: 忘れさせて...)	August 29, 2007
Following their strong performance at the Prefectural tournament, seven Umishō swimmers qualify for the Kantō tournament. Orizuka petitions the student council for a budget increase to cover travel costs. Meanwhile, during their walk home, Sanae suggests to Makio, Amuro, and Kaname that securing an adult advisor would help their funding appeal. She recounts—with dramatic embellishment—how she, Orizuka, Ikamasa, and their former coach originally formed the team. Kaname notes her story keeps changing, but this time Sanae adds a yuri-tinged twist about the coach's departure. Orizuka soon intercepts them (as Sanae slips away) and sharply corrects Sanae's version. In a postscript, Makio's proposal to create a team website initially flops—until she realizes what audiences truly want online, turning it into an unexpected success.
10	"Breast Massage?"; Transliteration: "Nyū Nyū?" (Japanese: にゅうにゅう?)	September 5, 2007
The Ono Island Summer Festival is in full swing when Amuro and Kaname encounter Maaya, who demands Kaname accompany her instead. Kaname, recalling her childhood bullying, refuses—which Maaya interprets as an insult about her small bust. She storms off, only to be comforted by Makio, who shares her own insecurities about her figure. Intrigued by Makio's mention of a "secret technique" for bust enhancement, the two retreat to the ladies' room. Meanwhile, the rest of the team finds Ikamasa running his father's rigged fishing booth—though Amuro, as usual, defies the odds. Kaname ends up competing against Amuro and her father in a watermelon-eating contest, with the loser facing a dunk tank. Back in the ladies' room, Maaya and Makio interrogate a flustered Shizuoka about her bust size. In a postscript, male teammates Takeda, Tsunime, and Jun scour the festival for "cute girls"—only to find their expectations hilariously subverted.
11	"Could It Be..."; Transliteration: "Masaka no..." (Japanese: まさかの････)	September 12, 2007
With the Kantō tournament just a week away, Maaya proposes a motivational wager: if Umishō wins, Kaname must obey any request from the swimmers—because "managers have it easy". Though hesitant, Kaname agrees to boost team morale. After a week of rigorous training, the team arrives at their tournament hotel, which boasts an open-air bath. There, they encounter Nanjou and the rival Shinomiya team, who immediately challenge them to a bizarre contest: the first team whose members all stand from the hot spring must shave their "under hairs" in front of the losers. The next day, both teams struggle in the preliminary heats—fatigued from the previous night's prolonged bath exposure. Maaya, devastated by her seventh-place finish, flees in humiliation. Shizuoka stumbles upon her and delivers an earnest pep talk, reminding her that defeat is not the end.
12	"Oma Oma"; Transliteration: "Oma Oma~" (Japanese: おまっおま〜♪)	September 19, 2007
Reinvigorated, the Umishō team rallies in the preliminaries, securing multiple victories. Kaname is reminded of his promise—if they win, he must fulfill any request—and Takeda teasingly suggests Amuro might demand a kiss. Amuro encounters the imposing Tamatsuka Academy team, their rivals in the Medley Relay. After a bizarre series of collisions with what she thinks is the same swimmer, she discovers the truth: Tamatsuka's squad consists of identical quadruplets. Their strategy deepens when their cheering section reveals itself as a synchronized choir, guiding the swimmers with their school anthem. In response, Ikamasa misinterprets the tactic and starts singing randomly, soon joined by Makio and Amuro in chaotic harmony. During the relay, Shizuoka closes the gap, but Orizuka—anchoring with a leg cramp—loses critical time. A last-minute switch to the Ono Island Dance Song (and Ikariya's surprise interference) disrupts Tamatsuka's rhythm, allowing Orizuka a desperate comeback. The victory comes at a cost: Orizuka's cramp worsens into a muscle tear, sidelining her not just from the medley finals but potentially threatening her swimming career.
13	"Mermaid"; Transliteration: "Ningyo" (Japanese: 人魚)	September 26, 2007
With Orizuka sidelined, Amuro steps in as anchor for the Medley Relay. After Sanae falls behind in the breaststroke leg, Shizuoka's butterfly surge claws back lost ground, setting the stage for Amuro's unorthodox "mermaid" technique. In a stunning comeback, she overtakes Tamatsuka and Shinomiya, securing victory and propelling multiple Umishō swimmers—including Ikariya—to the Inter-High tournament. As Orizuka and Sanae reflect on their three years with the team, Kaname braces for Amuro's demand, expecting a kiss. Instead, she simply asks him to swim with her. When he slips into the water, the truth surfaces: Amuro is the mermaid who saved him years ago in Okinawa. The next day, chaos erupt as the team demands their own rewards. When Kaname claims Amuro already received hers, accusations of dating fly. Kaname denies it—but Amuro's coy "You guys found out?" leaves everyone stunned. A post-credits montage (featuring manga-style stills) hints at the team's next journey: the Inter-High tournament in Okinawa.

=== Internet radio ===
An internet radio version of the anime series, Kenkō Zenrakei Suieibu Umishō: Junbi Undō (ケンコー全裸系水泳部 ウミショー 準備運動), was first streamed on the Japanese websites Ōnsen and BEWE from May 16 to June 27, 2007. A continuation, Kenkō Zenrakei Suieibu Umishō: Natsu!! Honban (ケンコー全裸系水泳部 ウミショー 夏!!本番), began streaming on July 4, 2007. The first version of the series featured Hitomi Nabatame, voice actor of Momoko Orizuka, while the continuation featured Nabatame and Aki Toyosaki, voice actor of Amuro Ninagawa.

=== Video game ===
A video game developed by 5pb. Inc., titled Umishō (ウミショー), was released for the PlayStation 2 on November 22, 2007.
