= Mitsuru Hattori =

Japanese manga artist (born 1977)

- Born: Mitsuru Hattori (服部 充); October 8, 1977 (age 49) Toba, Mie, Japan
- Area: Manga artist
- Notable works: Kenkō Zenrakei Suieibu Umishō, Sankarea: Undying Love, Wash It All Away

Mitsuru Hattori (はっとりみつる, Hattori Mitsuru; born October 8, 1977) is a Japanese manga artist. He is best known for his works Kenkō Zenrakei Suieibu Umishō, Sankarea: Undying Love, and Wash It All Away, all of which were adapted into anime television series.

== Works ==
- Inu Neko Jump! (イヌっネコっジャンプ！) (2000–2002, serialized in Young Magazine Uppers, Kodansha)
- Otogi no Machi no Rena (おとぎのまちのれな, Rena in the Strange Town) (2002–2004, serialized in Uppers, Kodansha)
- Concerto (2005-2011, short stories serialized in Young Animal, Hakusensha)
- Kenkō Zenrakei Suieibu Umishō (ケンコー全裸系水泳部 ウミショー) (2006–2008, serialized in Weekly Shonen Magazine, Kodansha)
- Love Fool (2009, one-shot published in Tsubomi volume 1, Hobunsha)
- Sankarea: Undying Love (さんかれあ) (2009-2014, serialized in Bessatsu Shōnen Magazine, Kodansha)
- Wash It All Away (綺麗にしてもらえますか, Kirei ni Shite Moraemasu ka) (2017-2023, serialized in Young Gangan, Square Enix)
- Monster-Colored Island (かいじゅう色の島, Monster-Colored Island) (2018–present, Young Dragon Age, Fujimi Shobo)
