= List of isekai works =

Works belonging to the isekai genre

This is a list of novels, light novels, manga, manhwa, anime, films, and video games according to the role isekai (portal fantasy) plays in them.

== Novels and light novels ==
- The 6th Loop: I'm Finally Free of Auto Mode in this Otome Game
- The 8th Son? Are You Kidding Me?
- 100 Ways Not to Fail in Another World
- A Gatherer's Adventure in Isekai
- A Gentle Noble's Vacation Recommendation
- A Journey Through Another World: Raising Kids While Adventuring
- A Lily Blooms in Another World
- A Man With a Thousand Skills Started to Summon a Beast in Different World!
- A Middle-Aged Guy Turned Transcendent Explores a Different World at His Own Pace
- A Salad Bowl of Eccentrics
- A Veterinarian in Another World
- A Wild Last Boss Appeared!
- Accidentally Summoned (Oops, sorry.)
- Accomplishments of the Duke's Daughter
- Aesthetica of a Rogue Hero
- After-School Dungeon Diver: Level Grinding in Another World
- Alice in the Country of Hearts
- Am I Actually the Strongest?
- Amagi Brilliant Park
- The Ambition of Oda Nobuna
- An Observation Log of My Fiancée Who Calls Herself a Villainess
- Ansatsu Skill de Isekai Saikyou: Renkinjutsu to Ansatsujutsu wo Kiwameta Ore wa, Sekai wo Kage kara Shihai suru
- Apocalypse Bringer Mynoghra
- Argate Online
- Arifureta: From Commonplace to World's Strongest
- As a Reincarnated Aristocrat, I'll Use My Appraisal Skill to Rise in the World
- As the Demon King's Right Hand, I'm Going to Rewrite the Script!
- Ascendance of a Bookworm
- Before the Tutorial Starts: A Few Things I Can Do to Keep the Bosses Alive
- The Black Healer
- Black Summoner
- Bluesteel Blasphemer
- Bonjin Tensei no Doryoku Musō: Akachan no Koro kara Doryoku Shitetara Itsunomanika Nihon no Mirai o Seotte Mashita
- Brave Story
- Buck Naked in Another World
- Butareba: The Story of a Man Turned into a Pig
- By the Grace of the Gods
- Café Happiness: Food from Out of This World
- Campfire Cooking in Another World with My Absurd Skill
- Carol: A Day in a Girl's Life
- Cautious Hero: The Hero Is Overpowered but Overly Cautious
- Cheating My Way through a Different World with my Tablet to Live a Comfortable Life
- The Child Loved by God
- Chillin' in Another World with Level 2 Super Cheat Powers
- Chronicles of an Aristocrat Reborn in Another World
- Chronicles of the Hidden World: How I Became a Doctor for the Gods
- The Conqueror from a Dying Kingdom
- Cooking with Wild Game
- Cop Craft
- Cross-Dressing Villainess Cecilia Sylvie
- The Cursed Sword Master's Harem Life: By the Sword, For the Sword
- Dagashi-ya Yahagi: Setting Up a Sweets Shop in Another World
- Dahlia in Bloom
- The Daily Life of a Middle-Aged Online Shopper in Another World
- The Day I was Born into a Ducal House, I was Branded as a Disqualified Heir, but I'm Still Living Well to This Day!
- The Death Mage
- Death March to the Parallel World Rhapsody
- Deathbound Duke's Daughter
- Defeating the Demon Lord's a Cinch (If You've Got a Ringer)
- Demon Fist Daydreamer
- Demon Lord 2099
- Demon Lord, Retry!
- Der Werwolf: The Annals of Veight
- The Devil Is a Part-Timer!
- The Diary of a Middle-Aged Sage's Carefree Life in Another World
- Did I Seriously Just Get Reincarnated as My Gag Character?!
- Didn't I Say to Make My Abilities Average in the Next Life?!
- The Dirty Way to Destroy the Goddess's Heroes
- Disciple of the Lich: Or How I Was Cursed by the Gods and Dropped Into the Abyss!
- Do You Love Your Mom and Her Two-Hit Multi-Target Attacks?
- Dog Days
- Drugstore in Another World
- Dungeon Battle Royale
- Dungeon Dive: Aim for the Deepest Level
- Dungeon Seeker
- Easygoing Territory Defense by the Optimistic Lord: Production Magic Turns a Nameless Village into the Strongest Fortified City
- The Economics of Prophecy
- The Eminence in Shadow
- Enough with This Slow Life! I Was Reincarnated as a High Elf and Now I'm Bored
- The Ephemeral Scenes of Setsuna's Journey
- The Epic Tale of the Reincarnated Prince Herscherik
- Even Dogs Go to Other Worlds
- The Evil Queen's Beautiful Principles
- The Executioner and Her Way of Life
- The Exiled Heavy Knight Knows How to Game the System
- Failure Frame: I Became the Strongest and Annihilated Everything with Low-Level Spells
- Fake Cinderella
- Fake Saint of the Year: You Wanted the Perfect Saint? Too Bad!
- The Familiar of Zero
- Fantasy Inbound
- The Faraway Paladin
- Farming Life in Another World
- Final Fantasy: Unlimited
- Finding Avalon
- Fluffy Paradise
- Forget Being the Villainess, I Want to Be an Adventurer!
- Former Vet Lady Has Had Her Engagement Called Off, but Is Very Popular with the Fluffies!
- Formerly, the Fallen Daughter of the Duke
- From Maid to Mother
- From Overshadowed to Overpowered: Second Reincarnation of a Talentless Sage
- From Two-Bit Baddie to Total Heartthrob: This Villainess Will Cross-Dress to Impress!
- The Fruit of Evolution: Before I Knew It, My Life Had It Made
- Full Clearing Another World under a Goddess with Zero Believers
- Fushi no Kami: Rebuilding Civilization Starts With a Village
- Gacha Girls Corps
- The Game Master Has Logged In to Another World
- Gate
- The Girl, the Shovel, and the Evil Eye
- God Came to Apologize Because I Had a Hard Time in My Past Life
- God Mazinger
- The Golden Word Master: The Four Heroes & The Innocent Bystander with the Unique Cheat
- Goodbye Otherworld, See You Tomorrow
- Goodbye, Overtime!
- Grand Sumo Villainess
- Grandpa is Summoned
- The Great Cleric
- The Greatest Magicmaster's Retirement Plan
- Grimgar of Fantasy and Ash
- Happy Harem Making with the Mightiest Orc
- Harem in the Labyrinth of Another World
- The Haunted Bookstore – Gateway to a Parallel Universe
- Hell Mode: The Hardcore Gamer Dominates in Another World with Garbage Balancing
- Her Majesty's Swarm
- Her Royal Highness Seems to be Angry
- The Hero and His Elf Bride Open a Pizza Parlor in Another World
- The Hero Laughs While Walking the Path of Vengeance a Second Time
- Heroine? Saint? No, I'm an All-Works Maid (and Proud of It)!
- High School Prodigies Have It Easy Even in Another World
- The Hitchhiker's Guide to the Isekai
- Housekeeping Mage from Another World: Making Your Adventures Feel Like Home!
- How a Realist Hero Rebuilt the Kingdom
- How Not to Summon a Demon Lord
- Huh? I'm Just a Normal Girl!
- Hunting in Another World With My Elf Wife
- I Aim For a Relaxed Life in Another World with the Fluffies!
- I Came to Another World as a Jack of All Trades and a Master of None to Journey while Relying on Quickness
- I Got a Cheat Skill in Another World and Became Unrivaled in the Real World, Too
- I Got Caught Up in a Hero Summons, but the Other World Was at Peace!
- I Kept Pressing the 100-Million Button and Came Out on Top
- I Refuse to Be Your Enemy!
- I Shall Survive Using Potions!
- I Surrendered My Sword for a New Life as a Mage
- I Think I'll Cheat to Become a Spellsword in Another World
- I Was Reincarnated as the Villainess in an Otome Game but the Boys Love Me Anyway!
- I Was Sold Dirt Cheap, But My Power Level Is Off the Charts
- I Won't Become a Villainess. I'm Just a "Normal" Duke's Daughter!
- I'll Become a Villainess Who Goes Down in History
- I'll Never be Your Crown Princess!
- I'm a NEET but When I Went to Hello Work I Got Taken to Another World
- I'm Capped at Level 1?! Thus Begins My Journey to Become the World's Strongest Badass!
- I'm in Love with the Villainess
- I'm the Evil Lord of an Intergalactic Empire!
- I'm the Villainess, So I'm Taming the Final Boss
- I'm not a Villainess!! Just Because I Can Control Darkness, Doesn't Mean I'm a Villain
- I'm Not the Hero!
- I've Became Able to Do Anything with My Growth Cheat, but I Can't Seem to Get out of Being Jobless
- I've Been Killing Slimes for 300 Years and Maxed Out My Level
- The Ideal Sponger Life
- In Another World with My Smartphone
- In the Land of Leadale
- Infinite Dendrogram
- The Invincible Little Lady
- The Invincible Summoner Who Crawled Up from Level 1
- Isekai Cheat Magician
- Isekai Izakaya "Nobu"
- Isekai Omotenashi Gohan
- Isekai Onsen Paradise
- Isekai Rebuilding Project
- The Isekai Returnee is Too OP for the Modern World
- Isekai Tensei: Recruited to Another World
- It's Sudden, But I Came to Another World! But I Hope to Live Safely
- It's That Reincarnated-as-a-Virus Story
- JK Haru is a Sex Worker in Another World
- Kakuriyo: Bed and Breakfast for Spirits
- Karate Master Isekai
- Kingdom Hearts
- Knight's & Magic
- KonoSuba
- Kuma Kuma Kuma Bear
- Kyo Kara Maoh!
- Lady Rose Just Wants to Be a Commoner!
- Lazy Dungeon Master
- Leave Me Alone: I Want to Enjoy Cheat Life with My Familiar
- Leda: The Fantastic Adventure of Yohko
- Let's Buy the Land and Cultivate It in a Different World
- Let's Take a Walk in Another World
- The Life Trajectory of an Evil Queen
- Live Freely in Another World with an Equipment Manufacturing Cheat
- Log Horizon
- Lonely Castle in the Mirror
- Loner Life in Another World
- The Magic in this Other World is Too Far Behind!
- Magic Maker
- Magic Stone Gourmet: Eating Magical Power Made Me the Strongest!
- Magic User: Reborn in Another World as a Max Level Wizard
- Magical Explorer
- The Magical Revolution of the Reincarnated Princess and the Genius Young Lady
- The Magician Who Rose From Failure
- Mahō Tsukai ni Narenakatta Onna no Ko no Hanashi
- Maiden of the Needle
- Making Magic: The Sweet Life of a Witch Who Knows an Infinite MP Loophole
- Maō-gun Saikyō no Majutsushi wa Ningen Datta
- Märchen Mädchen
- The Master of Ragnarok & Blesser of Einherjar
- Maze
- Me, a Genius? I Was Reborn into Another World and I Think They've Got the Wrong Idea!
- Meikyuu: Labyrinth Kingdom, A Tactical Fantasy World Survival Guide
- Middle-Aged Businessman, Arise in Another World!
- Might as Well Cheat: I Got Transported to Another World Where I Can Live My Wildest Dreams!
- Min-Maxing My TRPG Build in Another World
- The Misdeeds of an Extremely Arrogant Villain Aristocrat
- Mixed Bathing in Another Dimension
- Modern Villainess: It's Not Easy Building a Corporate Empire Before the Crash
- Monster Tamer
- Moon Blossom Asura: The Ruthless Reincarnated Mercenary Forms the Ultimate Army
- The Most Heretical Last Boss Queen
- Multi-Mind Mayhem
- Mushoku Tensei
- My Death Flags Show No Sign of Ending
- My Engagement Got Broken off (lol)
- My Instant Death Ability Is So Overpowered
- My Isekai Life: I Gained a Second Character Class and Became the Strongest Sage in the World!
- My Lady Just Wants to Relax
- My Next Life as a Villainess: All Routes Lead to Doom!
- My One-Hit Kill Sister
- My Quiet Blacksmith Life in Another World
- My Role As The Villainess Is Over!
- My Room is a Dungeon Rest Stop
- My Status as an Assassin Obviously Exceeds the Hero's
- My Unique Skill Makes Me OP Even at Level 1
- The Mythical Hero's Otherworld Chronicles
- The New Gate
- New Life+: Young Again in Another World
- No Game No Life
- Now I'm a Demon Lord! Happily Ever After with Monster Girls in My Dungeon
- Offense and Defense in Daites
- Onegai My Melody
- Only I Know That This World Is a Game
- Only the Villainous Lord Wields the Power to Level Up
- The Only Thing I'd Do in a No-Boys-Allowed Gaming World
- Opening a Café in Another World
- The Ordeals of Regional Knight Hans
- Orenchi ni Kita Onna Kishi to Inakagurashi suru Koto ni Natta Ken
- The Other World's Books Depend on the Bean Counter
- Otherside Picnic
- Otherworld Nation Founding Chronicles
- The Otherworlder, Exploring the Dungeon
- The Otome Heroine's Fight for Survival
- Outbreak Company
- Outer Ragna
- Overlord
- Oversummoned, Overpowered, and Over It!
- Parallel World Pharmacy
- Party kara Tsuihō Sareta Sono Chiyushi, Jitsu wa Saikyō ni Tsuki
- Peddler in Another World: I Can Go Back to My World Whenever I Want!
- Pens Down, Swords Up: Throw Your Studies to the Wind
- Planet of the Orcs
- Possibly the Greatest Alchemist of All Time
- Problem Children Are Coming from Another World, Aren't They?
- Re:Monster
- Re:RE — Reincarnator Executioner
- Re:Zero − Starting Life in Another World
- Reborn as a Barrier Master
- Reborn as a Polar Bear: The Legend of How I Became a Forest Guardian
- Reborn as a Space Mercenary: I Woke Up Piloting the Strongest Starship!
- Reborn as a Vending Machine, I Now Wander the Dungeon
- The Reborn Prince Wants to Be Lazy
- Record of Highserk War
- Record of Wortenia War
- The Reformation of the World as Overseen by a Realist Demon King
- Reincarnated as a Dragon Hatchling
- Reincarnated as a Sword
- Reincarnated as an Apple: This Forbidden Fruit Is Forever Unblemished!
- Reincarnated as the Daughter of the Legendary Hero and the Queen of Spirits
- Reincarnated as the Piggy Duke: This Time I'm Gonna Tell Her How I Feel!
- The Reincarnated Evil Dragon
- Reincarnated Into a Game as the Hero's Friend: Running the Kingdom Behind the Scenes
- The Reincarnated Princess Craves Common People Food
- The Reincarnated Princess Spends Another Day Skipping Story Routes
- The Reincarnation of the Strongest Exorcist in Another World
- Restaurant to Another World
- The Rising of the Shield Hero
- RVing My Way into Exile with My Beloved Cat
- The Saga of Lioncourt
- The Saga of Tanya the Evil
- The Saint's Magic Power Is Omnipotent
- Saint? No! I'm Just a Passing Beast Tamer!
- Sasaki and Peeps
- Saving 80,000 Gold in Another World for My Retirement
- The Savior's Book Café Story in Another World
- Seirei Gensouki: Spirit Chronicles
- Shachibato! President, It's Time for Battle!
- She Professed Herself Pupil of the Wise Man
- The Sidekick Never Gets the Girl, Let Alone the Protag's Sister!
- The Simple Life of an Ex-Villainess (With a Fluffy Friend?!)
- Since I Was Abandoned After Reincarnating, I Will Cook With My Fluffy Friends
- Skeleton Knight in Another World
- Slow Life In Another World (I Wish!)
- So I'm a Spider, So What?
- The Sorcerer King of Destruction and the Golem of the Barbarian Queen
- The Spearmaster and the Black Cat
- Strongest Gamer: Let's Play in Another World
- The Strongest Job is Apparently Not a Hero or a Sage, but an Appraiser (Provisional)!
- The Struggles of a Reincarnated Marquess's Daughter: I'll be Taken Down in Style!
- Summoned to Another World... Again?
- Survival in Another World with My Mistress!
- Survival Strategies of a Corrupt Aristocrat
- Sweet Reincarnation
- Sword Art Online
  - Sword Art Online Alternative Gun Gale Online
- Taking My Reincarnation One Step at a Time: No One Told Me There Would Be Monsters!
- The Tanaka Family Reincarnates
- Teogonia
- Tenchi Muyo! War on Geminar
- That Time God Killed me by Accident and Brought me Back as a Blacksmith in Another World
- That Time I Got Reincarnated as a Slime
- These Legs Don't Lie! Harumi's Legacy as the Strongest Mimic
- They Ridiculed Me for My Luckless Job, but It's Not Actually That Bad?
- This Is Screwed Up, but I Was Reincarnated as a Girl in Another World!
- To Another World... with Land Mines!
- Tokyo Isekai Fudousan
- Torture Princess: Fremd Torturchen
- The Transfer Destination Was a World with few Pharmacists
- Trapped in a Dating Sim: The World of Otome Games Is Tough for Mobs
- The Trials of Chiyodaku
- The Troubles of Miss Nicola the Exorcist
- Tsukimichi: Moonlit Fantasy
- The Twelve Kingdoms
- The Unimplemented Overlords Have Joined the Party!
- The Unrivaled Reincarnated Sage of Another World ~The Strongest in Another World Through Game Knowledge~
- Villainess: Reloaded! Blowing Away Bad Ends with Modern Weapons
- The Villainess and the Demon Knight
- Villainess Level 99: I May Be the Hidden Boss but I'm Not the Demon Lord
- The Villainess Who Became a Nightingale
- The Villainess with Special Circumstances
- The Villainess' Butler: Death Flag Destroyer at Your Service
- The Villainess's Guide to (Not) Falling in Love
- The Vision of Escaflowne
- WATARU!!! The Hot-Blooded Fighting Teen & His Epic Adventures After Stopping a Truck with His Bare Hands!!!
- The Water Magician
- The Weakest Tamer Began a Journey to Pick Up Trash
- Welcome to Japan, Ms. Elf!
- Where to Go in a Whole Other World?
- The White Cat's Revenge as Plotted from the Dragon King's Lap
- Why Shouldn't a Detestable Demon Lord Fall in Love?!
- Wise Man's Grandchild
- Within the Villainess
- The Wolf Never Sleeps
- Woof Woof Story: I Told You to Turn Me Into a Pampered Pooch, Not Fenrir!
- The World Bows Down Before My Flames
- World Customize Creator
- World Teacher: Special Agent in Another World
- The World's Finest Assassin Gets Reincarnated in Another World as an Aristocrat
- The World's Least Interesting Master Swordsman
- The World's Strongest Rearguard: Labyrinth Country's Novice Seeker
- The Wrong Way to Use Healing Magic
- Young Lady Albert Is Courting Disaster

== Anime and manga ==
- The 4th Grader Demon Lord
- The 6th Loop: I'm Finally Free of Auto Mode in this Otome Game
- The 8th Son? Are You Kidding Me?
- 12 Beast
- 100 Sleeping Princes and the Kingdom of Dreams
- 100 Ways Not to Fail in Another World
- A Cat from Our World and the Forgotten Witch
- A Gatherer's Adventure in Isekai
- A Gentle Noble's Vacation Recommendation
- A Journey Through Another World: Raising Kids While Adventuring
- A Man With a Thousand Skills Started to Summon a Beast in Different World!
- A Middle-Aged Guy Turned Transcendent Explores a Different World at His Own Pace
- A Reincarnated Witch Spells Doom
- A Story about a Cat Reincarnated in a Different World Where There are no Cats.
- A Veterinarian in Another World
- A Wild Last Boss Appeared!
- Accidentally Summoned (Oops, sorry.)
- Accomplishments of the Duke's Daughter
- Aesthetica of a Rogue Hero
- After-School Dungeon Diver: Level Grinding in Another World
- Akuyaku Reijō no Naka no Hito
- Akuyaku Reijō Tensei Oji-san
- Alice in Bishounen-Land
- Alice in Borderland
- Alice in the Country of Hearts
- Am I Actually the Strongest?
- Amagi Brilliant Park
- Amatsuki
- The Ambition of Oda Nobuna
- An Observation Log of My Fiancée Who Calls Herself a Villainess
- Ansatsu Skill de Isekai Saikyou: Renkinjutsu to Ansatsujutsu wo Kiwameta Ore wa, Sekai wo Kage kara Shihai suru
- Apocalypse Bringer Mynoghra
- Arata: The Legend
- Argate Online
- Arifureta: From Commonplace to World's Strongest
- As a Reincarnated Aristocrat, I'll Use My Appraisal Skill to Rise in the World
- As the Demon King's Right Hand, I'm Going to Rewrite the Script!
- Ascendance of a Bookworm
- Aura Battler Dunbine
  - Garzey's Wing
  - The Wings of Rean
- Bakugan Battle Brawlers
- Battle Girls: Time Paradox
- Becoming a Princess Knight and Working at a Yuri Brothel
- Before the Tutorial Starts: A Few Things I Can Do to Keep the Bosses Alive
- The Black Healer
- Black Summoner
- The Black Witch Runs Her Own Boarding House in Another World.
- Brave Story
- Butareba: The Story of a Man Turned into a Pig
- By the Grace of the Gods
- Café Happiness: Food from Out of This World
- The Cat Returns
- Call Girl in Another World
- Campfire Cooking in Another World with My Absurd Skill
- Capricorn
- Carol: A Day in a Girl's Life
- Castration: Rebirth
- Cautious Hero: The Hero Is Overpowered but Overly Cautious
- Cheat Slayer
- Cheating My Way through a Different World with my Tablet to Live a Comfortable Life
- The Child Loved by God
- Chillin' in Another World with Level 2 Super Cheat Powers
- Chronicles of an Aristocrat Reborn in Another World
- Chronicles of the Hidden World: How I Became a Doctor for the Gods
- Conception
- The Conqueror from a Dying Kingdom
- Cooking with Wild Game
- Cop Craft
- Creature Girls: A Hands-On Field Journal in Another World
- Cross-Dressing Villainess Cecilia Sylvie
- Cube Arts
- The Cursed Sword Master's Harem Life: By the Sword, For the Sword
- Dagashi-ya Yahagi: Setting Up a Sweets Shop in Another World
- Dahlia in Bloom
- The Daily Life of a Middle-Aged Online Shopper in Another World
- The Dark History of the Reincarnated Villainess
- The Day I was Born into a Ducal House, I was Branded as a Disqualified Heir, but I'm Still Living Well to This Day!
- The Days After the Hero's Return
- Dead Mount Death Play
- The Death Mage
- Death March to the Parallel World Rhapsody
- Deathbound Duke's Daughter
- Defeating the Demon Lord's a Cinch (If You've Got a Ringer)
- Demon Fist Daydreamer
- Demon Lord 2099
- Demon Lord, Retry!
- Der Werwolf: The Annals of Veight
- Derayd
- The Devil Is a Part-Timer!
- Devilish Darlings Portal Fantasy
- The Diary of a Middle-Aged Sage's Carefree Life in Another World
- Did I Seriously Just Get Reincarnated as My Gag Character?!
- Didn't I Say to Make My Abilities Average in the Next Life?!
- Dimension High School
- Disciple of the Lich: Or How I Was Cursed by the Gods and Dropped Into the Abyss!
- Disney Twisted-Wonderland
- Do You Love Your Mom and Her Two-Hit Multi-Target Attacks?
- Doctor Elise
- Dog Days
- Dragon Ball: That Time I Got Reincarnated as Yamcha
- Dragon Collection
- Dream Saga
- Drifters
- Drugstore in Another World
- Dungeon Battle Royale
- Dungeon Dive: Aim for the Deepest Level
- The Dungeon of Black Company
- Dungeon Seeker
- Dungeon Toilet
- Easygoing Territory Defense by the Optimistic Lord: Production Magic Turns a Nameless Village into the Strongest Fortified City
- El-Hazard
- The Elder Sister-like One
- The Eminence in Shadow
- Endride
- The Ephemeral Scenes of Setsuna's Journey
- The Epic Tale of the Reincarnated Prince Herscherik
- Eternal Alice
- Even Dogs Go to Other Worlds
- The Executioner and Her Way of Life
- The Exiled Heavy Knight Knows How to Game the System
- The Exo-Drive Reincarnation Games: All-Japan Isekai Battle Tournament!
- Failure Frame: I Became the Strongest and Annihilated Everything with Low-Level Spells
- Fake Cinderella
- Fake Saint of the Year: You Wanted the Perfect Saint? Too Bad!
- The Familiar of Zero
- The Faraway Paladin
- Farming Life in Another World
- The Fed-Up Office Lady Wants to Serve the Villainess
- Fiancée of the Wizard
- Final Fantasy Lost Stranger
- Final Fantasy: Unlimited
- Finding Avalon
- Fluffy Paradise
- Forget Being the Villainess, I Want to Be an Adventurer!
- Former Vet Lady Has Had Her Engagement Called Off, but Is Very Popular with the Fluffies!
- Formerly, the Fallen Daughter of the Duke
- From Far Away
- From Maid to Mother
- From Overshadowed to Overpowered: Second Reincarnation of a Talentless Sage
- From Two-Bit Baddie to Total Heartthrob: This Villainess Will Cross-Dress to Impress!
- The Fruit of Evolution: Before I Knew It, My Life Had It Made
- Fudanshi Shōkan
- Full Clearing Another World under a Goddess with Zero Believers
- Fushi no Kami: Rebuilding Civilization Starts With a Village
- Fushigi no Kuni no Alice
- Fushigi Yûgi
  - Fushigi Yûgi: Byakko Senki
  - Fushigi Yûgi: Genbu Kaiden
- Gacha Girls Corps
- Game of Familia
- Gate
- The Girl, the Shovel, and the Evil Eye
- Girls Bravo
- God Came to Apologize Because I Had a Hard Time in My Past Life
- God Mazinger
- The Golden Word Master: The Four Heroes & The Innocent Bystander with the Unique Cheat
- Goodbye Otherworld, See You Tomorrow
- Goodbye, Overtime! This Reincarnated Villainess Is Living for Her New Big Brother
- Goodbye! I'm Being Reincarnated!
- Grand Sumo Villainess
- Grandpa is Summoned
- The Great Cleric
- The Great Jahy Will Not Be Defeated!
- The Greatest Magicmaster's Retirement Plan
- Grimgar of Fantasy and Ash
- Gundam Build Divers Re:Rise
- Handyman Saitō in Another World
- Happy Harem Making with the Mightiest Orc
- Harem in the Labyrinth of Another World
- The Haunted Bookstore – Gateway to a Parallel Universe
- Headhunted to Another World: From Salaryman to Big Four!
- Hell Mode: The Hardcore Gamer Dominates in Another World with Garbage Balancing
- The Helpful Fox Senko-san
- Henjin no Salad Bowl
- Her Majesty's Swarm
- Her Royal Highness Seems to be Angry
- The Hero Laughs While Walking the Path of Vengeance a Second Time
- Heroine? Saint? No, I'm an All-Works Maid (and Proud of It)!
- High Elf with a Long Life
- High School Prodigies Have It Easy Even in Another World
- High-Rise Invasion
- His Majesty the Demon King's Housekeeper
- Housekeeping Mage from Another World: Making Your Adventures Feel Like Home!
- How a Realist Hero Rebuilt the Kingdom
- How Not to Summon a Demon Lord
- Huh? I'm Just a Normal Girl!
- Humanity's Existence Depends on Love Gambling with Another World's Princess
- Hunting in Another World With My Elf Wife
- I Aim For a Relaxed Life in Another World with the Fluffies!
- I Came to Another World as a Jack of All Trades and a Master of None to Journey while Relying on Quickness
- I Got a Cheat Skill in Another World and Became Unrivaled in the Real World, Too
- I Got Caught Up in a Hero Summons, but the Other World Was at Peace!
- I Got Reincarnated as a Son of Innkeepers!
- I Got Reincarnated in a (BL) World of Big (Man) Boobs
- I Guess I Became the Mother of the Great Demon King's 10 Children in Another World
- I Kept Pressing the 100-Million Button and Came Out on Top
- I Shall Survive Using Potions!
- I Surrendered My Sword for a New Life as a Mage
- I Think I'll Cheat to Become a Spellsword in Another World
- I Was Reincarnated as the Villainess in an Otome Game but the Boys Love Me Anyway!
- I Was Sold Dirt Cheap, But My Power Level Is Off the Charts
- I Won't Become a Villainess. I'm Just a "Normal" Duke's Daughter!
- I'll Become a Villainess Who Goes Down in History
- I'll Never be Your Crown Princess!
- I'm a (Fake) Saint Who Was Summoned to Another World
- I'm a NEET but When I Went to Hello Work I Got Taken to Another World
- I'm Capped at Level 1?! Thus Begins My Journey to Become the World's Strongest Badass!
- I'm in Love with the Villainess
- I'm not a Villainess!! Just Because I Can Control Darkness, Doesn't Mean I'm a Villain
- I'm Not the Hero!
- I'm Standing on a Million Lives
- I'm the Evil Lord of an Intergalactic Empire!
- I'm the Villainess, So I'm Taming the Final Boss
- I've Became Able to Do Anything with My Growth Cheat, but I Can't Seem to Get out of Being Jobless
- I've Been Killing Slimes for 300 Years and Maxed Out My Level
- Idaten Jump
- The Ideal Sponger Life
- In Another World Where Baseball Is War, A High School Ace Player Will Save A Weak Nation
- In Another World with My Smartphone
- In Another World, My Sister Stole My Name
- In the Land of Leadale
- Infinite Dendrogram
- Into the Deepest, Most Unknowable Dungeon
- The Invincible Little Lady
- The Invincible Summoner Who Crawled Up from Level 1
- Inuyasha
  - Inuyasha the Movie: Affections Touching Across Time
  - Inuyasha the Movie: The Castle Beyond the Looking Glass
  - Inuyasha the Movie: Fire on the Mystic Island
  - Inuyasha the Movie: Swords of an Honorable Ruler
  - Yashahime: Princess Half-Demon
- The Invincible Reincarnated Ponkotsu
- Isekai Affair: 10 Years After Defeating the Demon King, the Hero Cheats on His Wife With a Warrior Woman Who Lost Her Husband
- Isekai Cheat Magician
- Isekai Houtei: Rebuttal Barrister
- Isekai Izakaya "Nobu"
- Isekai of the Dead: Konbini Tenin no Ore ga Tenseishite Zombie to Tatakautte Maji!?
- Isekai Omotenashi Gohan
- Isekai Onsen Paradise
- Isekai Quartet
  - Isekai Quartet: The Movie – Another World
  - KonoSuba
    - KonoSuba: God's Blessing on This Wonderful World! Legend of Crimson
  - Overlord
  - Re:Zero − Starting Life in Another World
  - The Saga of Tanya the Evil
- The Isekai Returnee is Too OP for the Modern World
- Isekai Samurai
- Isekai Sniper wa Onna Senshi no Mofumofu Pet
- Isekai Tensei: Recruited to Another World
- It's Just Not My Night
- It's Sudden, But I Came to Another World! But I Hope to Live Safely
- It's That Reincarnated-as-a-Virus Story
- Ixion Saga DT
- Jewelpet
- JK Haru is a Sex Worker in Another World
- Kakuriyo: Bed and Breakfast for Spirits
- Kamigami no Asobi
- KamiKatsu
- Karate Master Isekai
- Karate Survivor in Another World
- Kemono Michi
- Kiba
- Killer Shark in Another World
- Kingdom Hearts
- Kirara Fantasia
- The Knight Cartoonist and Her Orc Editor
- Knight's & Magic
- Kuma Kuma Kuma Bear
- Kyo Kara Maoh!
- Lady Rose Just Wants to Be a Commoner!
- Laidbackers
- Lazy Dungeon Master
- Leave Me Alone: I Want to Enjoy Cheat Life with My Familiar
- Leda: The Fantastic Adventure of Yohko
- Legend of Heavenly Sphere Shurato
- Let's Buy the Land and Cultivate It in a Different World
- Let's Take a Walk in Another World
- The Life Trajectory of an Evil Queen
- Life with an Ordinary Guy Who Reincarnated into a Total Fantasy Knockout
- Live Freely in Another World with an Equipment Manufacturing Cheat
- Log Horizon
- Lonely Castle in the Mirror
- Loner Life in Another World
- Lupin the Third: Neighbor World Princess
- The Magic in this Other World is Too Far Behind!
- Magic Knight Rayearth
- Magic Maker
- Magic Stone Gourmet: Eating Magical Power Made Me the Strongest!
- Magic User: Reborn in Another World as a Max Level Wizard
- Magical Explorer
- The Magical Revolution of the Reincarnated Princess and the Genius Young Lady
- Magical Shopping Arcade Abenobashi
- Magical Witch Punie-chan
- The Magician Who Rose From Failure
- Mahō Tsukai ni Narenakatta Onna no Ko no Hanashi
- Maiden of the Needle
- Making Magic: The Sweet Life of a Witch Who Knows an Infinite MP Loophole
- Maō-gun Saikyō no Majutsushi wa Ningen Datta
- MÄR
- Märchen Mädchen
- Mashin Hero Wataru
- The Master of Ragnarok & Blesser of Einherjar
- Maze
- Middle-Aged Businessman, Arise in Another World!
- Might as Well Cheat: I Got Transported to Another World Where I Can Live My Wildest Dreams!
- Min-Maxing My TRPG Build in Another World
- Miss Kobayashi's Dragon Maid
- Miyuki-chan in Wonderland
- The Most Heretical Last Boss Queen
- Mon Colle Knights
- Monster Rancher
- Monster Tamer
- Multi-Mind Mayhem
- Mushoku Tensei
- My Death Flags Show No Sign of Ending
- My Engagement Got Broken off (lol)
- My Instant Death Ability Is So Overpowered
- My Isekai Life: I Gained a Second Character Class and Became the Strongest Sage in the World!
- My Lady Just Wants to Relax
- My Next Life as a Villainess: All Routes Lead to Doom!
- My One-Hit Kill Sister
- My Quiet Blacksmith Life in Another World
- My Role As The Villainess Is Over!
- My Room is a Dungeon Rest Stop
- My Status as an Assassin Obviously Exceeds the Hero's
- My Unique Skill Makes Me OP Even at Level 1
- The Mythical Detective Loki Ragnarok
- The New Gate
- New Life+: Young Again in Another World
- NG Knight Ramune & 40
  - VS Knight Ramune & 40 Fire
  - Knights of Ramune
- NiNoKuni
- Nirvana
- No Game No Life
  - No Game No Life: Zero
- No Longer Allowed in Another World
- Now and Then, Here and There
- Now I'm a Demon Lord! Happily Ever After with Monster Girls in My Dungeon
- Oblivion Island: Haruka and the Magic Mirror
- Offense and Defense in Daites
- Onegai My Melody
- The Ones Within
- Only I Know That This World Is a Game
- Only the Villainous Lord Wields the Power to Level Up
- The Only Thing I'd Do in a No-Boys-Allowed Gaming World
- Opening a Café in Another World
- The Ordeals of Regional Knight Hans
- Orenchi ni Kita Onna Kishi to Inakagurashi suru Koto ni Natta Ken
- Otaku Elf
- The Other World's Books Depend on the Bean Counter
- Otherside Picnic
- Otherworld Nation Founding Chronicles
- The Otherworlder, Exploring the Dungeon
- Otherworldly Munchkin: Let's Speedrun the Dungeon with Only 1 HP!
- Otogi-Jūshi Akazukin
- The Otome Heroine's Fight for Survival
- Outbreak Company
- Outbride: Beauty and the Beasts
- Over the Sky
- Oversummoned, Overpowered, and Over It!
- Parallel Paradise
- Parallel World Pharmacy
- Party kara Tsuihō Sareta Sono Chiyushi, Jitsu wa Saikyō ni Tsuki
- Peddler in Another World: I Can Go Back to My World Whenever I Want!
- Pens Down, Swords Up: Throw Your Studies to the Wind
- Peter Pan: The Animated Series
- Pick of the Litter
- Please Look After the Dragon
- Pop in Q
- Possibly the Greatest Alchemist of All Time
- Problem Children Are Coming from Another World, Aren't They?
- Quality Assurance in Another World
- Re:Creators
- Re:Monster
- Reborn as a Barrier Master
- Reborn as a Feudal Lord: Gathering a Talented Elite by Employing My Past Life Experiences as an Overworked White-Collar Worker
- Reborn as a Polar Bear: The Legend of How I Became a Forest Guardian
- Reborn as a Space Mercenary: I Woke Up Piloting the Strongest Starship!
- Reborn as a Vending Machine, I Now Wander the Dungeon
- The Reborn Prince Wants to Be Lazy
- Record of Highserk War
- Record of Wortenia War
- The Red Ranger Becomes an Adventurer in Another World
- Red River (manga)
- The Reformation of the World as Overseen by a Realist Demon King
- Reincarnated as a Dragon Hatchling
- Reincarnated as a Sword
- Reincarnated as an Apple: This Forbidden Fruit Is Forever Unblemished!
- Reincarnated as the Daughter of the Legendary Hero and the Queen of Spirits
- Reincarnated as the Piggy Duke: This Time I'm Gonna Tell Her How I Feel!
- The Reincarnated Evil Dragon
- Reincarnated Into a Game as the Hero's Friend: Running the Kingdom Behind the Scenes
- The Reincarnated Prince Becomes an Alchemist and Brings Prosperity to His Country
- The Reincarnated Princess Craves Common People Food
- The Reincarnated Princess Spends Another Day Skipping Story Routes
- The Reincarnation of the Strongest Exorcist in Another World
- Restaurant to Another World
- The Ride-On King
- The Rising of the Shield Hero
- Rozi in the Labyrinth
- The Saga of Lioncourt
- Saint Seiya: Dark Wing
- The Saint's Magic Power Is Omnipotent
- Saint? No! I'm Just a Passing Beast Tamer!
- Sasaki and Peeps
- Saving 80,000 Gold in Another World for My Retirement
- The Savior's Book Café Story in Another World
- Secret Rites with the Holy Maidens
- Seirei Gensouki: Spirit Chronicles
- Sengoku Night Blood
- Shachibato! President, It's Time for Battle!
- She Professed Herself Pupil of the Wise Man
- She's the Strongest Bride, But I'm Stronger in Night Battles: A Harem Chronicle of Advancing Through Cunning Tactics
- Shin Megami Tensei: Devil Children
- Shining Tears X Wind
- Show by Rock!!
- The Simple Life of an Ex-Villainess (With a Fluffy Friend?!)
- Since I Was Abandoned After Reincarnating, I Will Cook With My Fluffy Friends
- Skeleton Knight in Another World
- Slow Life In Another World (I Wish!)
- Smile PreCure!
- Star Detective PreCure!
- So I'm a Spider, So What?
- So What's Wrong with Getting Reborn as a Goblin?
- Sonic X
- Sonny Boy
- The Sorcerer King of Destruction and the Golem of the Barbarian Queen
- The Spearmaster and the Black Cat
- Spider-Man: Octo-Girl
- Spirited Away
- Strange Dawn
- The Strongest Job is Apparently Not a Hero or a Sage, but an Appraiser (Provisional)!
- The Strongest Middle-Aged Hunter Goes to Another World: This Time, He Wants to Have a Simple Life
- The Struggles of a Reincarnated Marquess's Daughter: I'll be Taken Down in Style!
- Sugar Sugar Rune
- Suicide Squad Isekai
- Summoned to Another World... Again?
- Super Mario Bros.: The Great Mission to Rescue Princess Peach!
  - The Super Mario Bros. Movie
- Superbook
- Survival in Another World with My Mistress!
- Sweet Reincarnation
- Sword Art Online
  - Sword Art Online Alternative Gun Gale Online
  - Sword Art Online The Movie: Ordinal Scale
  - Sword Art Online Progressive: Aria of a Starless Night
  - Sword Art Online Progressive: Scherzo of Deep Night
- Taking My Reincarnation One Step at a Time: No One Told Me There Would Be Monsters!
- The Tanaka Family Reincarnates
- Tales of Wedding Rings
- Tenchi Muyo! War on Geminar
- Tengen Hero Wars
- Tenkai Knights
- Teogonia
- Thank You, Isekai!
- That Time God Killed me by Accident and Brought me Back as a Blacksmith in Another World
- That Time I Got Reincarnated as a Slime
- They Ridiculed Me for My Luckless Job, but It's Not Actually That Bad?
- This Is Screwed Up, but I Was Reincarnated as a Girl in Another World!
- Those Who Hunt Elves
- Time Stop Hero
- The Titan's Bride
- To Another World... with Land Mines!
- Tobira o Akete
- Tokyo Isekai Fudousan
- Torture Princess: Fremd Torturchen
- The Transfer Destination Was a World with few Pharmacists
- Trapped in a Dating Sim: The World of Otome Games Is Tough for Mobs
- The Trials of Chiyodaku
- Tsubasa: Reservoir Chronicle
  - Tsubasa Reservoir Chronicle the Movie: The Princess in the Birdcage Kingdom
- Tsukimichi: Moonlit Fantasy
- Tweeny Witches
- The Twelve Kingdoms
- Ugly Duckling of the Entertainment District
- Uncle from Another World
- The Unimplemented Overlords Have Joined the Party!
- The Unrivaled Reincarnated Sage of Another World ~The Strongest in Another World Through Game Knowledge~
- Urashima Tarō
- Valhallian the Black Iron
- Valis
- Versus
- Viewtiful Joe
- Villainess: Reloaded! Blowing Away Bad Ends with Modern Weapons
- The Villainess and the Demon Knight
- Villainess Level 99: I May Be the Hidden Boss but I'm Not the Demon Lord
- The Villainess Stans the Heroes
- The Villainess Who Became a Nightingale
- The Villainess with Special Circumstances
- The Villainess' Butler: Death Flag Destroyer at Your Service
- The Villainess's Guide to (Not) Falling in Love
- The Vision of Escaflowne
  - Escaflowne (film)
- The War of Greedy Witches
- Watashi no Messiah-sama
- The Water Dragon's Bride
- The Water Magician
- The Weakest Contestant of All Space and Time
- The Weakest Tamer Began a Journey to Pick Up Trash
- Welcome to Demon School! Iruma-kun
- Welcome to Japan, Ms. Elf!
- Where to Go in a Whole Other World?
- The White Cat's Revenge as Plotted from the Dragon King's Lap
- The White Mage Doesn't Want to Raise the Hero's Level
- Why Raeliana Ended Up at the Duke's Mansion
- Wicked Trapper: Hunter of Heroes
- Wise Man's Grandchild
- Witch's Printing Office
- The Wizard of Oz (film)
- The Wolf Never Sleeps
- The Wonderful Galaxy of Oz
- The Wonderful Wizard of Oz (TV series)
- The Wonderland
- Woof Woof Story: I Told You to Turn Me Into a Pampered Pooch, Not Fenrir!
- The World Bows Down Before My Flames
- World Customize Creator
- World Teacher: Special Agent in Another World
- The World's Finest Assassin Gets Reincarnated in Another World as an Aristocrat
- The World's Least Interesting Master Swordsman
- The World's Strongest Rearguard: Labyrinth Country's Novice Seeker
- The Wrong Way to Use Healing Magic
- Yakuza Reincarnation
- Yandere Dark Elf: She Chased Me All the Way From Another World!
- Young Lady Albert Is Courting Disaster
- Yu-no: A Girl Who Chants Love at the Bound of This World
- Zatch Bell!
  - Zatch Bell! Movie 1: 101st Devil
  - Zatch Bell! Movie 2: Attack of Mechavulcan

=== Digimon series ===
- Digimon Adventure
- Digimon Adventure (2020–2021)
- Digimon Adventure: Last Evolution Kizuna
- Digimon Adventure: Our War Game!
- Digimon Adventure 02
- Digimon Adventure tri.
- Digimon Data Squad
- Digimon Frontier
- Digimon Frontier: Island of Lost Digimon
- Digimon Fusion
- Digimon Ghost Game
- Digimon Next
- Digimon Tamers
- Digimon Tamers: Battle of Adventurers
- Digimon Tamers: Runaway Locomon
- Digimon Universe: App Monsters

== Manhwa ==
- Another Typical Fantasy Romance
- Crowning my Feral Prince
- Daughter of the Emperor
- Doctor Elise
- Dungeon Reset
- The Greatest Estate Developer
- How to Use a Returner
- How to Win My Husband Over
- I Adopted the Male Lead
- Latna Saga: Survival of a Sword King
- Pick Me Up: Infinite Gacha
- Surviving the Game as a Barbarian
- Tyrant of the Tower Defense Game
- Villains Are Destined to Die
- Who Made Me a Princess
- Why Raeliana Ended Up at the Duke's Mansion

== Video games ==
- Brave Fencer Musashi
  - Musashi: Samurai Legend
- Brave Story: New Traveler
- Brütal Legend
- Cadence of Hyrule
- Comix Zone
- Exist Archive
- Final Fantasy Tactics Advance
  - Final Fantasy Tactics A2: Grimoire of the Rift
- Final Fantasy X
- Forspoken
- Graveyard Keeper
- The Legend of Zelda: Majora's Mask
  - The Legend of Zelda: Majora's Mask 3D
- Moon: Remix RPG Adventure
- Ni no Kuni
  - Ni no Kuni: Dominion of the Dark Djinn
  - Ni no Kuni: Wrath of the White Witch
  - Ni no Kuni II: Revenant Kingdom
- Pokémon Mystery Dungeon
  - Pokémon Mystery Dungeon: Blue Rescue Team and Red Rescue Team
  - Pokémon Mystery Dungeon: Explorers of Sky
  - Pokémon Mystery Dungeon: Explorers of Time and Explorers of Darkness
  - Pokémon Mystery Dungeon: Gates to Infinity
  - Pokémon Mystery Dungeon: Rescue Team DX
  - Pokémon Super Mystery Dungeon
- Professor Layton vs. Phoenix Wright: Ace Attorney
- Re:Zero − Starting Life in Another World: The Prophecy of the Throne
- Yu-no: A Girl Who Chants Love at the Bound of This World

=== Digimon series ===
- Digimon Adventure
- Digimon Adventure: Anode/Cathode Tamer
- Digimon All-Star Rumble
- Digimon Battle Online
- Digimon Battle Spirit
- Digimon Battle Spirit 2
- Digimon Digital Card Battle
- Digimon Masters
- Digimon Racing
- Digimon Rumble Arena
- Digimon Rumble Arena 2
- Digimon Story Lost Evolution
- Digimon Survive
- Digimon Tamers: Battle Spirit Ver. 1.5
- Digimon World
- Digimon World 2
- Digimon World 3
- Digimon World 4
- Digimon World Championship
- Digimon World Data Squad
- Digimon World Dawn and Dusk
- Digimon World DS
- Digimon World Re:Digitize
- Digimon World: Next Order

=== Kingdom Hearts series ===
- Kingdom Hearts
- Kingdom Hearts II
- Kingdom Hearts III
- Kingdom Hearts IV
- Kingdom Hearts 358/2 Days
- Kingdom Hearts 3D: Dream Drop Distance
- Kingdom Hearts Birth by Sleep
- Kingdom Hearts Coded
- Kingdom Hearts HD 1.5 Remix
- Kingdom Hearts HD 2.5 Remix
- Kingdom Hearts HD 2.8 Final Chapter Prologue
- Kingdom Hearts Mobile
- Kingdom Hearts χ
- Kingdom Hearts: Chain of Memories
- Kingdom Hearts: Melody of Memory
