= Torture Princess: Fremd Torturchen =

Japanese light novel series

- Cover of the first light novel volume featuring Elisabeth

異世界拷問姫 (Isekai Goumon Hime)
- Genre: Dark fantasy; Isekai
- Light novel
- Written by: Keishi Ayasato
- Illustrated by: Saki Ukai
- Published by: Media Factory
- English publisher: NA: Yen Press
- Imprint: MF Bunko J
- Original run: April 25, 2016 – February 25, 2020
- Volumes: 10
- Manga
- Written by: Keishi Ayasato
- Illustrated by: Hina Yamato
- Published by: Kadokawa
- English publisher: NA: Yen Press
- Imprint: MF Comics
- Original run: October 25, 2017 – September 22, 2018
- Volumes: 3

Torture Princess: Fremd Torturchen (Japanese: 異世界拷問姫, Hepburn: Isekai Goumon Hime) is a Japanese light novel series created by Keishi Ayasato and illustrated by Saki Ukai. Media Factory published the series in Japan from April 2016 to February 2020 under their MF Bunko J label. The story focuses on Kaito, a young man who after being strangled to death by his father is summoned to another world by the Torture Princess, Elisabeth Le Fanu. Working as Elisabeth's butler, Kaito aids Elisabeth in her assignment to destroy fourteen demons that torment the world.

== Plot ==
Kaito is a 17-year-old boy who grew up in Japan, living a life of abuse at the hands of his father. After one day being strangled to death by his father, he is summoned to another world by Elisabeth Le Fanu, the Torture Princess. She offers him two choices, either serving her as a butler or death. Having experienced a life of cruelty, Kaito initially chooses death only to change his decision after realizing that his death would be slow and excruciatingly painful. Kaito learns that Elisabeth is tasked by a mysterious organization known as the Church to dispose of fourteen demons and their contractors, and once Elisabeth has finished this task she herself will be put to death by the Church for her crimes.

One day Elisabeth decides to grant Kaito with a weapon of his choosing from the Treasury in Elisabeth's castle. Inside the Treasury, Kaito accidentally activates a female automaton which proceeds to chase him. Elisabeth subdues and then proceeds to reset the automaton. Kaito selects a configuration for the automaton that will not result in it betraying him. Afterwards, Kaito names the automaton Hina, and she becomes immediately enamored with him.

A mysterious figure known as the Butcher arrives one day to bring Elisabeth various meats and organs, only for him to reveal that a demon, known as the Earl, has been attacking a territory. Heading to the scene of the incident, Elisabeth and Kaito discover a means to enter the Earl's residence only for the two of them to be separated along with the Earl's other captives. Kaito attempts to protect the other child captives from the sadistic cruelty of the Earl, but is ultimately unsuccessful. Kaito tries to sacrifice himself in order to save a young boy with red hair named Neue, only for the boy to trade places with him while wishing for Kaito to one day find happiness. Elisabeth later kills the Earl, and Kaito never forgets the sacrifice Neue made for his sake.

As they continue to defeat demons, Kaito grows to come to terms with the cruel end of his first life. He begins to regard his new life with Elisabeth and Hina as precious. Kaito also learns more about Elisabeth's past and how she became the Torture Princess. Eventually, Kaito makes a contract with a demon, known as the Kaiser, in order to save Elisabeth from a powerful demon, known as the Grand King. Kaito promises the Church that he will never harm humanity as he does not want to betray Neue's expectations nor does Kaito wish to harm people like his father did. With Hina's help Kaito is able to defeat the Grand King and save Elisabeth, but Hina is left in a temporary state of sleep. Before Hina enters this comatose state, Kaito returns her affections by telling her that she is his beloved wife.

Elisabeth and Kaito receive urgent news that the Capital is under attack by the remaining three demons. At the Capital, Kaito comes to realize that he admires Elisabeth and views her as his hero. While the majority of humanity regards Elisabeth as a villain, to Kaito it was Elisabeth that finally gave him an opportunity of having a happy life by summoning him to her world. Kaito tries to convince Elisabeth to escape the Church's punishment once she defeats the remaining demons, but she insists that she will accept her fate. Unsatisfied, Kaito vows to protect this precious life with his master Elisabeth and wife Hina. During their fight with the last three demons Hina wakes up, and together they defeat them. Elisabeth is then arrested by the Church and sent to the stake the next morning to burn.

Kaito, Hina, and the Kaiser interrupt the execution, and Kaito declares himself the enemy of mankind. The Church postpones the execution and assigns Elisabeth the new task of killing Kaito, much to her chagrin. Elisabeth, Hina, and Kaito come to learn that the Church harbors dark secrets that would change humanity forever. They embark on a journey to stop the Church's secret sinister schemes.

== Media ==
Torture Princess: Fremd Torturchen is a light novel series written by Keishi Ayasato and illustrated by Saki Ukai. It was first released in Japan on April 25, 2016 and the ninth and last volume was released on February 25, 2020. A bonus novel, volume 7.5, was released on February 25, 2019, containing four short stories focusing on the main characters and their daily lives. The series was licensed by Yen Press for an English release with the first volume being released on May 21, 2019.

A manga version of the first volume of the light novel was created with art by Hina Yamato. It comprised three volumes in Japan and was released from October 25, 2017 to September 22, 2018, while the English version was released by Yen Press as a single omnibus volume collecting all three on July 30, 2019.

An art book by Saki Ukai entitled Salty Colors: Saki Ukai Artworks was released by Media Factory in Japan on September 25, 2020. It collects illustrations from all released light novels and bonus materials along with the illustrator's commentary.

== Reception ==
Theron Martin from Anime News Network praised the art style and psychological elements of the novels, while also remarking that the gory aspects of the series are not for the faint of heart. Martin also wrote of the main protagonist Kaito that "his backstory makes the typical otaku lament about an unsatisfying life seem pathetically trivial by comparison." Shaenon Garrity from Otaku USA said "the manga looks great, packed with attractive antiheroes, weird villains, gross monsters, good fight scenes, and eerie Gothic atmosphere with blood and rose petals flying everywhere."
