= Thank You, Isekai! =

Japanese manga series

- First tankōbon volume cover

異世界ありがとう (Isekai Arigatō)
- Genre: Comedy; Isekai
- Manga
- Written by: Azuki Arai
- Illustrated by: Zianazu
- Published by: Shogakukan
- English publisher: NA: Comikey
- Imprint: Ura Sunday Comics
- Magazine: Ura Sunday; MangaONE
- Original run: November 27, 2021 – present
- Volumes: 10

Thank You, Isekai! (異世界ありがとう, Isekai Arigatō) is a Japanese manga series written by Azuki Arai and illustrated by Zianazu. It began serialization on Shogakukan's Ura Sunday website and MangaONE app in November 2021.

== Synopsis ==
The series is centered around two thirty-year-old men named Chiba and Shiina. After meeting at a high school reunion, the two immediately get along and become fast friends. They suddenly go through a series of misfortunes that culminates in them waking up as girls in another world.

== Publication ==
Written by Azuki Arai and illustrated by Zianazu, Thank You, Isekai! began serialization on Shogakukan's Ura Sunday website and MangaONE app on November 27, 2021. The series' chapters have been collected into ten tankōbon volumes (including two published digital-only) as of July 2026. The series is licensed in English by Comikey, but official translations have ceased since 2024, at chapter 49.

No.	Release date	ISBN
1	May 12, 2022	978-4-09-851108-2
2	October 19, 2022	978-4-09-851381-9
3	March 17, 2023	978-4-09-851755-8
4	July 19, 2023	978-4-09-852555-3
5	January 18, 2024	978-4-09-853094-6
6	July 18, 2024	978-4-09-853444-9
7	January 17, 2025	978-4-09-853797-6
8	July 11, 2025	978-4-09-854180-5
9	February 12, 2026	—
10	July 10, 2026	—

== Reception ==
The series was nominated for the eighth Next Manga Awards in the web category and won the U-Next Award.
