= Peddler in Another World: I Can Go Back to My World Whenever I Want! =

Japanese light novel series

- First light novel volume cover

いつでも自宅に帰れる俺は、異世界で行商人をはじめました (Itsudemo Jitaku ni Kaereru Ore wa, Isekai de Gyōshōnin o Hajimemashita)
- Genre: Isekai
- Novel series
- Written by: Hiiro Shimotsuki
- Published by: Shōsetsuka ni Narō
- Original run: June 13, 2019 – present
- Light novel
- Written by: Hiiro Shimotsuki
- Illustrated by: Takashi Iwasaki
- Published by: Hobby Japan
- English publisher: NA: J-Novel Club
- Imprint: HJ Novels
- Original run: April 22, 2020 – present
- Volumes: 14
- Manga
- Written by: Hiiro Shimotsuki
- Illustrated by: Shizuku Akechi
- Published by: Hobby Japan
- English publisher: NA: J-Novel Club
- Imprint: HJ Comics
- Magazine: Comic Fire
- Original run: July 17, 2020 – present
- Volumes: 7

Peddler in Another World: I Can Go Back to My World Whenever I Want! (いつでも自宅に帰れる俺は、異世界で行商人をはじめました, Itsudemo Jitaku ni Kaereru Ore wa, Isekai de Gyōshōnin o Hajimemashita) is a Japanese light novel series written by Hiiro Shimotsuki and illustrated by Takashi Iwasaki. It began serialization on the user-generated novel publishing website Shōsetsuka ni Narō in June 2019. It was later acquired by Hobby Japan who began publishing it under their HJ Novels imprint in April 2020. A manga adaptation illustrated by Shizuku Akechi began serialization on Hobby Japan's Comic Fire manga website in July 2020.

== Media ==
=== Light novel ===
Written by Hiiro Shimotsuki, Peddler in Another World: I Can Go Back to My World Whenever I Want! began serialization on the user-generated novel publishing website Shōsetsuka ni Narō on June 13, 2019. It was later acquired by Hobby Japan who began releasing it with illustrations by Takashi Iwasaki under their HJ Novels light novel imprint on April 22, 2020. Fourteen volumes have been released as of October 2026. The light novels are licensed in English by J-Novel Club.

No.	Original release date	Original ISBN	North American release date	North American ISBN
1	April 22, 2020	978-4-7986-2198-2	December 6, 2022	978-1-71-834948-3
2	August 22, 2020	978-4-7986-2273-6	February 20, 2023	978-1-71-834950-6
3	December 22, 2020	978-4-7986-2377-1	May 8, 2023	978-1-71-834952-0
4	June 19, 2021	978-4-7986-2510-2	August 7, 2023	978-1-71-834954-4
5	December 18, 2021	978-4-7986-2700-7	November 6, 2023	978-1-71-834956-8
6	August 19, 2022	978-4-7986-2898-1	February 8, 2024	978-1-71-834958-2
7	February 20, 2023	978-4-7986-3079-3	April 29, 2024	978-1-71-834960-5
8	October 19, 2023	978-4-7986-3317-6	August 13, 2024	978-1-71-834962-9
9	February 19, 2024	978-4-7986-3414-2	November 21, 2024	978-1-71-834964-3
10	October 18, 2024	978-4-7986-3647-4	May 12, 2025	978-1-71-834966-7
11	May 19, 2025	978-4-7986-3849-2	December 19, 2025	978-1-7183-4968-1
12	September 19, 2025	978-4-7986-3960-4	April 3, 2026	978-1-7183-4970-4
13	March 19, 2026	978-4-7986-4126-3	October 7, 2026	978-1-7183-4972-8
14	October 19, 2026	978-4-7986-4265-9	—	—

=== Manga ===
A manga adaptation illustrated by Shizuku Akechi began serialization on Hobby Japan's Comic Fire manga website on July 17, 2020. The manga's chapters have been collected into seven tankōbon volumes as of December 2025.

During their Anime NYC 2022 panel, J-Novel Club announced that they also licensed the manga adaptation for English publication.

No.	Original release date	Original ISBN	North American release date	North American ISBN
1	March 1, 2021	978-4-7986-2430-3	March 8, 2023	978-1-71-835230-8
2	September 1, 2021	978-4-7986-2584-3	August 9, 2023	978-1-71-835231-5
3	July 1, 2022	978-4-7986-2810-3	October 11, 2023	978-1-71-835232-2
4	May 1, 2023	978-4-7986-2994-0	January 31, 2024	978-1-71-835233-9
5	May 1, 2024	978-4-7986-3259-9	February 5, 2025	978-1-71-835234-6
6	April 1, 2025	978-4-7986-3680-1	February 11, 2026	978-1-71-835235-3
7	December 1, 2025	978-4-7986-4019-8	July 29, 2026	978-1-71-835236-0
