= Pens Down, Swords Up: Throw Your Studies to the Wind =

Japanese light novel series

- First light novel volume cover

剣と魔法と学歴社会 ～前世はガリ勉だった俺が、今世は風任せで自由に生きたい～ (Ken to Mahō to Gakurekishakai: Zense wa Gariben datta Ore ga, Konse wa Kaze Makase de Jiyū ni Ikitai)
- Genre: Fantasy, isekai
- Novel series
- Written by: Mao Nishiura
- Published by: Shōsetsuka ni Narō
- Original run: April 12, 2022 – present
- Light novel
- Written by: Mao Nishiura
- Illustrated by: Maro
- Published by: Fujimi Shobo
- English publisher: NA: J-Novel Club
- Imprint: Kadokawa Books
- Original run: July 10, 2023 – present
- Volumes: 8
- Manga
- Written by: Mao Nishiura
- Illustrated by: Kyōsuke Tanabe
- Published by: ASCII Media Works
- Imprint: Dengeki Comics NEXT
- Magazine: Dengeki Comic Regulus
- Original run: December 1, 2023 – present
- Volumes: 5

Pens Down, Swords Up: Throw Your Studies to the Wind (Japanese: 剣と魔法と学歴社会 ～前世はガリ勉だった俺が、今世は風任せで自由に生きたい～, Hepburn: Ken to Mahō to Gakurekishakai: Zense wa Gariben datta Ore ga, Konse wa Kaze Makase de Jiyū ni Ikitai) is a Japanese light novel series written by Mao Nishiura and illustrated by Maro. It began serialization on the user-generated novel publishing website Shōsetsuka ni Narō in April 2022. It was later acquired by Fujimi Shobo who began publishing it under their Kadokawa Books imprint in July 2023. A manga adaptation illustrated by Kyōsuke Tanabe began serialization on ASCII Media Works' Dengeki Comic Regulus manga website in December 2023.

== Media ==
=== Light novel ===
Written by Mao Nishiura, Pens Down, Swords Up: Throw Your Studies to the Wind began serialization on the user-generated novel publishing website Shōsetsuka ni Narō on April 12, 2022. It was later acquired by Fujimi Shobo who began releasing it with illustrations by Maro under their Kadokawa Books light novel imprint on July 10, 2023. Eight volumes have been released as of July 2026. The series is licensed in English by J-Novel Club.

No.	Original release date	Original ISBN	North American release date	North American ISBN
1	July 10, 2023	978-4-04-075005-7	February 21, 2025	978-1-71-831586-0
2	December 8, 2023	978-4-04-075206-8	June 12, 2025	978-1-71-831588-4
3	May 10, 2024	978-4-04-075418-5	September 30, 2025	978-1-71-831590-7
4	October 10, 2024	978-4-04-075656-1	December 8, 2025	978-1-71-831592-1
5	March 10, 2025	978-4-04-075847-3	March 12, 2026	978-1-71-831594-5
6	August 8, 2025	978-4-04-076054-4	June 29, 2026	978-1-71-831596-9
7	January 9, 2026	978-4-04-076242-5	October 1, 2026	978-1-71-831598-3
8	July 10, 2026	978-4-04-076463-4	—	—

=== Manga ===
A manga adaptation illustrated by Kyōsuke Tanabe began serialization on ASCII Media Works' Dengeki Comic Regulus manga website on December 1, 2023. The manga's chapters have been collected into five tankōbon volumes as of October 2026.

No.	Release date	ISBN
1	July 26, 2024	978-4-04-915821-2
2	December 26, 2024	978-4-04-916151-9
3	August 8, 2025	978-4-04-916563-0
4	February 27, 2026	978-4-04-916903-4
5	October 27, 2026	978-4-04-952475-8

== Reception ==
The series was ranked tenth in the tankōbon category at the 2023 Next Light Novel Awards; and sixth in the same category in the 2024 edition.
