= Isekai Tensei: Recruited to Another World =

Japanese light novel series

- Cover of the first light novel volume

異世界転生の冒険者 (Isekai Tensei no Bōkensha)
- Genre: Adventure; Isekai
- Novel series
- Written by: Kenichi
- Published by: Shōsetsuka ni Narō
- Original run: January 25, 2015 – April 10, 2023
- Light novel
- Written by: Kenichi
- Illustrated by: Nem
- Published by: Mag Garden
- English publisher: NA: J-Novel Club
- Imprint: Mag Garden Novels
- Original run: April 10, 2017 – April 10, 2024
- Volumes: 16
- Manga
- Written by: Kenichi
- Illustrated by: Bancha Shibano
- Published by: Mag Garden
- English publisher: NA: J-Novel Club
- Magazine: Mag Comi
- Original run: August 25, 2018 – present
- Volumes: 14
- icon

Isekai Tensei: Recruited to Another World (Japanese: 異世界転生の冒険者, Hepburn: Isekai Tensei no Bōkensha) is a Japanese light novel series written by Kenichi and illustrated by Nem. A manga adaptation by Bancha Shibano began serialization online on Mag Garden's Mag Comi manga website in May 2018. J-Novel Club has licensed both the light novel and manga for an English release.

== Plot ==
Tenma Otori's life ends abruptly at age 25, but his journey is far from over. He wakes up at his own funeral to find a God offering him a deal: reincarnate into a dying fantasy world to help stabilize it, and in exchange, receive "cheat-level" magical abilities and physical stats. Tenma accepts and is reborn as an infant in the lush world of Merlin. He is adopted by a pair of retired S-Rank adventurers and a legendary wizard grandfather who raise him in the remote Kukuri Village. Under their strict but loving tutelage, Tenma's overpowered nature quickly becomes apparent—not only can he cast high-level spells effortlessly, but he possesses a rare affinity for taming monsters, starting with a unique slime and a pack of divine wolves. However, his peaceful childhood is shattered when a mysterious organization targets his village, leading to a tragic confrontation that forces Tenma to leave home. Setting out as a solo adventurer, he travels from bustling trade cities to dangerous monster-infested dungeons. Along the way, he must navigate the envy of rival adventurers, the political schemes of royalty, and the growing responsibility of using his god-given powers to protect those who cannot protect themselves.

== Media ==
=== Light novel ===
Written by Kenichi and illustrated by Nem, Isekai Tensei: Recruited to Another World was originally serialized as a web novel on Shōsetsuka ni Narō in January 2015 to April 2023. Mag Garden released the first printed volume under its Mag Garden Novels in April 2017 and ran for 16 volumes until April 2024. In July 2022, J-Novel Club announced on at the Anime Expo that they licensed the series for English publication. The first volume was release digitally on August 18, 2022. In January 2025, J-Novel Club announced that they are releasing printed volumes of the series starting September 2025.

==== Volumes ====
No.	Original release date	Original ISBN	English release date	English ISBN
1	April 10, 2017	978-4-8000-0670-7	August 18, 2022 (digital); September 9, 2025 (omnibus)	978-1-7183-1812-0 (digital); 978-1-7183-6030-3 (omnibus)
2	October 10, 2017	978-4-8000-0718-6	November 8, 2022 (digital); September 9, 2025 (omnibus)	978-1-7183-1814-4 (digital); 978-1-7183-6030-3 (omnibus)
3	May 10, 2018	978-4-8000-0762-9	February 23, 2023 (digital); November 11, 2025 (omnibus)	978-1-7183-1816-8 (digital); 978-1-7183-6031-0 (omnibus)
4	October 10, 2018	978-4-8000-0799-5	June 8, 2023 (digital); November 11, 2025 (omnibus)	978-1-7183-1818-2 (digital); 978-1-7183-6031-0 (omnibus)
5	December 10, 2018	978-4-8000-0810-7	September 21, 2023 (digital); January 13, 2026 (omnibus)	978-1-7183-1820-5 (digital); 978-1-7183-6032-7 (omnibus)
6	May 10, 2019	978-4-8000-0849-7	January 24, 2024 (digital); January 13, 2026 (omnibus)	978-1-7183-1822-9 (digital); 978-1-7183-6032-7 (omnibus)
7	November 9, 2019	978-4-8000-0907-4	May 13, 2024 (digital); March 10, 2026 (omnibus)	978-1-7183-1824-3 (digital); 978-1-7183-6033-4 (omnibus)
8	February 10, 2020	978-4-8000-0934-0	September 19, 2024 (digital); March 10, 2026 (omnibus)	978-1-7183-1826-7 (digital); 978-1-7183-6033-4 (omnibus)
9	June 10, 2020	978-4-8000-0963-0	December 31, 2024 (digital); July 14, 2026 (omnibus)	978-1-7183-1828-1 (digital); 978-1-7183-6034-1 (omnibus)
10	November 10, 2020	978-4-8000-1024-7	May 6, 2025 (digital); July 14, 2026 (omnibus)	978-1-7183-1830-4 (digital); 978-1-7183-6034-1 (omnibus)
11	May 10, 2021	978-4-8000-1080-3	August 26, 2025 (digital); November 10, 2026 (omnibus)	978-1-7183-1832-8 (digital); 978-1-7183-6035-8 (omnibus)
12	December 20, 2021	978-4-8000-1152-7	December 16, 2025 (digital); November 10, 2026 (omnibus)	978-1-7183-1834-2 (digital); 978-1-7183-6035-8 (omnibus)
13	May 20, 2022	978-4-8000-1202-9	April 16, 2026 (digital)	978-1-7183-1836-6
14	January 10, 2023	978-4-8000-1274-6	August 27, 2026 (digital)	978-1-7183-1838-0
15	April 10, 2024	978-4-8000-1434-4	December 15, 2026 (digital)	978-1-7183-1840-3
16	April 10, 2024	978-4-8000-1435-1	—	—

=== Manga ===
A manga adaptation by Bancha Shibano began serialization on Mag Garden's Mag Comi website in August 2018. As of June 2026, fourteen tankōbon volumes have been released. J-Novel Club also licensed the manga for English publication. The first volume was released digitally on August 15, 2022. The first printed volume was released on August 12, 2025.

==== Volumes ====
No.	Original release date	Original ISBN	English release date	English ISBN
1	February 14, 2019	978-4-8000-0831-2	August 15, 2022 (digital); August 12, 2025 (print)	978-1-7183-2750-4 (digital); 978-1-7183-6038-9 (print)
2	October 12, 2019	978-4-8000-0904-3	November 30, 2022 (digital); October 14, 2025 (print)	978-1-7183-2751-1 (digital); 978-1-7183-6039-6 (print)
3	April 14, 2020	978-4-8000-0959-3	February 21, 2023 (digital); December 9, 2025 (print)	978-1-7183-2752-8 (digital); 978-1-7183-6040-2 (print)
4	November 13, 2020	978-4-8000-1029-2	June 21, 2023 (digital); February 10, 2026 (print)	978-1-7183-2753-5 (digital); 978-1-7183-6041-9 (print)
5	July 14, 2021	978-4-8000-1116-9	August 29, 2023 (digital); April 13, 2026 (print)	978-1-7183-2754-2 (digital); 978-1-7183-6042-6 (print)
6	February 14, 2022	978-4-8000-1178-7	November 15, 2023 (digital); June 9, 2026 (print)	978-1-7183-2755-9 (digital); 978-1-7183-6043-3 (print)
7	November 14, 2022	978-4-8000-1267-8	March 27, 2024 (digital); August 11, 2026 (print)	978-1-7183-2756-6 (digital); 978-1-7183-6044-0 (print)
8	May 11, 2023	978-4-8000-1329-3	July 24, 2024 (digital); October 13, 2026 (print)	978-1-7183-2757-3 (digital); 978-1-7183-6045-7 (print)
9	November 14, 2023	978-4-8000-1393-4	January 22, 2025 (digital)	978-1-7183-2758-0
10	May 14, 2024	978-4-8000-1451-1	April 16, 2025 (digital)	978-1-7183-2759-7
11	November 14, 2024	978-4-8000-1522-8	September 10, 2025 (digital)	978-1-7183-2760-3
12	May 14, 2025	978-4-8000-1598-3	December 3, 2025 (digital)	978-1-7183-2761-0
13	December 12, 2025	978-4-8000-1678-2	July 8, 2026 (digital)	978-1-7183-2762-7
14	June 12, 2026	978-4-8000-1771-0	—	—

== Reception ==
Rebecca Silverman of Anime News Network gave the manga adaptation's first volume a 3.5 star out of 5, praising the art and calling the plot "comfortable".
