= Secret Rites with the Holy Maidens =

Japanese manga series

- First tankōbon volume cover

聖なる乙女と秘めごとを (Seinaru Otome to Himegoto o)
- Genre: Isekai; Romantic comedy
- Manga
- Written by: Bonjin Hirameki
- Published by: Kodansha
- English publisher: NA: Seven Seas Entertainment
- Imprint: Young Magazine KC Special
- Magazine: YanMaga Web
- Original run: July 20, 2024 – present
- Volumes: 13

Secret Rites with the Holy Maidens (聖なる乙女と秘めごとを, Seinaru Otome to Himegoto o; lit. "The Holy Maiden and the Secret") is a Japanese manga series written and illustrated by Bonjin Hirameki. It began serialization on Kodansha's YanMaga Web service in July 2024, and has been compiled into thirteen volumes as of October 2026.

== Plot ==
The series follows Itsuki Kusaka, a man who wakes up in another world after falling asleep. He finds himself in a city where men are strictly forbidden. He is told that he was summoned to this world to guide the candidates to be the next goddess about sex, with the promise that he will be allowed to return to Japan once this is accomplished.

== Characters ==
Itsuki Kusaka (日下 イツキ, Kusaka Itsuki)
A man who wakes up in another world after being summoned by the Goddess of the Four Flowers. He wants to return to Japan, but cannot until he completes the mission she gives him. He is referred to as the Sage of Hinomoto.
Goddess of the Four Flowers (四つ花の女神, Yottsu Hana no Megami)
The goddess of the Capital of Flowers. She summoned Itsuki to guide the goddess candidates about sex. She promises Itsuki that once he has done his mission, not only will he return to Japan, but she would also grant him a wish. As a goddess, she has a giant body, but once her term as a goddess ends, she will return to being a normal human.
Lily (リリィ, Rirī)
A sister and one of the goddess candidates. She is chosen to be the first woman that Itsuki guides.
Rose (ローズ, Rōzu)
A sister and one of the goddess candidates.
Talia (タリア, Taria)
A sister and one of the goddess candidates.
Lupina (ルピナ, Rupina)
A sister and one of the goddess candidates.

== Publication ==
Written and illustrated by Bonjin Hirameki, the series began serialization on Kodansha's YanMaga Web service on July 20, 2024. The first tankōbon volume was released on October 18, 2024, with the volume selling well enough for Kodansha to order reprints. Thirteen volumes have been released as of October 2026. The manga is licensed in English by Seven Seas Entertainment, who publishes it under their Ghost Ship imprint.

No.	Original release date	Original ISBN	English release date	English ISBN
1	October 18, 2024	978-4-06-537139-8	October 20, 2026	979-8-89863-401-8
2	December 19, 2024	978-4-06-537711-6	February 16, 2027	979-8-89863-402-5
3	February 19, 2025	978-4-06-538363-6	June 22, 2027	979-8-89863-403-2
4	April 18, 2025	978-4-06-539079-5	—	—
5	June 19, 2025	978-4-06-539908-8	—	—
6	August 20, 2025	978-4-06-540297-9	—	—
7	October 20, 2025	978-4-06-541065-3	—	—
8	December 19, 2025	978-4-06-541786-7	—	—
9	February 19, 2026	978-4-06-542391-2	—	—
10	April 20, 2026	978-4-06-543125-2	—	—
11	June 19, 2026	978-4-06-543752-0	—	—
12	August 20, 2026	978-4-06-544451-1	—	—
13	October 20, 2026	978-4-06-545135-9	—	—

== See also ==
- Remake Our Life!, a light novel series with a manga adaptation illustrated by Hirameki
