= Taking My Reincarnation One Step at a Time =

Japanese light novel series

- Taking My Reincarnation One Step at a Time: No One Told Me There Would Be Monsters!
- First light novel volume cover

転生少女はまず一歩からはじめたい～魔物がいるとか聞いてない！～ (Tensei Shōjo wa Mazu Ippo kara Hajimetai: Mamono ga Iru toka Kiitenai!)
- Genre: Isekai
- Novel series
- Written by: Kaya
- Published by: Shōsetsuka ni Narō
- Original run: December 10, 2019 – present
- Light novel
- Written by: Kaya
- Illustrated by: Naru
- Published by: Media Factory
- English publisher: NA: J-Novel Club
- Imprint: MF Books
- Original run: September 25, 2020 – November 25, 2025
- Volumes: 10
- Manga
- Written by: Kaya
- Illustrated by: Ayumu Okamura
- Published by: Mag Garden
- Imprint: Mag Garden Comics
- Magazine: Mag Comi
- Original run: July 10, 2021 – present
- Volumes: 8

Taking My Reincarnation One Step at a Time: No One Told Me There Would Be Monsters! (転生少女はまず一歩からはじめたい～魔物がいるとか聞いてない！～, Tensei Shōjo wa Mazu Ippo kara Hajimetai Mamono ga Iru toka Kiitenai!) is a Japanese light novel series written by Kaya and illustrated by Naru. It began serialization online on the user-generated novel publishing website Shōsetsuka ni Narō in December 2019. It was later acquired by Media Factory who published it under their MF Books light novel imprint from September 2020 to November 2025. A manga adaptation illustrated by Ayumu Okamura began serialization on Mag Garden's Mag Comi manga website in July 2021.

== Plot ==
Sarasa Ichinokura suffers from a fatigue that has affected her since her childhood. One day, she experiences a dream where a goddess tells her that she suffers from a lack of mana, and suddenly gets transported to another world and wakes up in the body of a young girl in a land occupied by beasts. As she prepares for death, Sarasa later gets taken in by a hunter named Nelly, and for the first time in her life Sarasa feels energetic, and ultimately decides to learn magic on a step-by-step basis.

== Media ==
=== Light novel ===
Written by Kaya, Taking My Reincarnation One Step at a Time: No One Told Me There Would Be Monsters! began serialization online on the user-generated novel publishing website Shōsetsuka ni Narō on December 10, 2019. It was later acquired by Media Factory who published ten volumes with illustrations by Naru under their MF Books light novel imprint from September 25, 2020, to November 25, 2025. The light novels are licensed in English by J-Novel Club.

No.	Original release date	Original ISBN	North American release date	North American ISBN
1	September 25, 2020	978-4-04-064938-2	July 31, 2023	978-1-7183-7818-6
1. Prologue: "The Goddess's Room"; 2. Chapter 1: "You Wolves Don't Scare Me"; 3. Chapter 2: "To Rosa We Go"; 4. Chapter 3: "Left Behind"; 5. Epilogue: "In the Capital"
2	February 25, 2021	978-4-04-680243-9	October 2, 2023	978-1-7183-7820-9
1. Prologue: "Let's Buy a Tent"; 2. Chapter 1: "Sara and the Knights"; 3. Chapter 2: "Sara and Allen in Rosa"; 4. Interlude: "Escape from the Capital"; 5. Chapter 3: "The Truth Is Right in Front of You"; 6. Epilogue: "Homecoming"
3	August 25, 2021	978-4-04-680693-2	December 1, 2023	978-1-7183-7822-3
1. Prologue: "People Who Just Don't Listen"; 2. Chapter 1: "An Excess of Invited"; 3. Chapter 2: "My First Trip"; 4. Chapter 3: "An Excess of Frogs Too"; 5. Epilogue: "The Real Fun of Trips"
4	March 25, 2022	978-4-04-681284-1	February 26, 2024	978-1-7183-7824-7
1. Prologue: "Monsters Aren't the Only Danger Around"; 2. Chapter 1: "The Mushroom Village"; 3. Chapter 2: "Headed Where Sara's Heart Desires"; 4. Chapter 3: "Home Sweet Dark Mountain"; 5. Epilogue: "Out of the Frying Pan, into the Fire"
5	September 25, 2022	978-4-04-681653-5	May 20, 2024	978-1-7183-7826-1
1. Prologue: "Soon to Be an Apothecary"; 2. Chapter 1: "Everyone and Their Uncle, Headed for the Capital"; 3. Chapter 2: "In the Capital"; 4. Chapter 3: "Plant Gathering"; 5. Chapter 4: "Sara's Abilities"; 6. Epilogue: "Still Far to Go"
6	April 25, 2023	978-4-04-682417-2	August 23, 2024	978-1-7183-7828-5
1. Prologue: "Hellhounds, Incoming!"; 2. Chapter 1: "Continental Tortoise"; 3. Chapter 2: "Capital Combat"; 4. Chapter 3: "Back Home to Rosa"; 5. Epilogue: "Whenever, Wherever"
7	November 25, 2023	978-4-04-683073-9	December 23, 2024	978-1-7183-7830-8
1. Prologue: "News Always Comes Unexpectedly"; 2. Chapter 1: "Reunions Should Be Merry"; 3. Chapter 2: "Green Grass Locusts"; 4. Chapter 3: "No-Fly Zone"; 5. Epilogue: "Things Left Undone"
8	September 25, 2024	978-4-04-684049-3	August 1, 2025	978-1-7183-7832-2
1. Prologue: "Wedding"; 2. Chapter 1: "Graduation Exam"; 3. Chapter 2: "Hearts Adrift"; 4. Chapter 3: "Sara the Apothecary"; 5. Epilogue: "Because You're Here"
9	March 24, 2025	978-4-04-684646-4	January 9, 2026	978-1-7183-7834-6
1. Prologue: "It Begins, Once Again, With a Letter"; 2. Chapter 1: "To Gardenia, to Pick Up Ann"; 3. Chapter 2: "Ann Puts in the Work"; 4. Chapter 3: "Ann Joins the Knights"; 5. Epilogue: "A Smiling Tomorrow"
10	November 25, 2025	978-4-04-685468-1	July 30, 2026	978-1-7183-7836-0
1. Prologue: "Visitors Aplenty"; 2. Chapter 1: "Off to Rosa"; 3. Chapter 2: "School's in Session Even in Rosa"; 4. Chapter 3: "To the Dark Mountain"; 5. Epilogue: "How Have You Been?"

=== Manga ===
A manga adaptation illustrated by Ayumu Okamura began serialization on Mag Garden's Mag Comi manga website on July 10, 2021. The manga's chapters have been collected into eight tankōbon volumes as of June 2026.

No.	Release date	ISBN
1	December 14, 2021	978-4-8000-1160-2
2	August 12, 2022	978-4-8000-1237-1
3	February 14, 2023	978-4-8000-1299-9
4	November 14, 2023	978-4-8000-1392-7
5	June 13, 2024	978-4-8000-1465-8
6	February 14, 2025	978-4-8000-1554-9
7	October 14, 2025	978-4-8000-1648-5
8	June 12, 2026	978-4-8000-1767-3
