= The Death Mage =

Japanese light novel series

- First light novel volume cover

四度目は嫌な死属性魔術師 (Yondome wa Iya na Shizokusei Majutsushi)
- Genre: Fantasy, isekai
- Novel series
- Written by: Densuke
- Published by: Shōsetsuka ni Narō
- Original run: June 30, 2015 – November 26, 2021
- Light novel
- Written by: Densuke
- Illustrated by: Ban!
- Published by: Hifumi Shobō
- English publisher: NA: One Peace Books
- Imprint: Saga Forest
- Original run: December 15, 2016 – present
- Volumes: 17
- Manga
- Written by: Densuke
- Illustrated by: Takehiro Kojima
- Published by: Media Factory
- English publisher: NA: One Peace Books
- Imprint: MF Comics
- Magazine: ComicWalker (Note: ComicWalker changed its name to KadoComi (カドコミ) in December 2023.)
- Original run: June 24, 2018 – present
- Volumes: 16

The Death Mage (四度目は嫌な死属性魔術師, Yondome wa Iya na Shizokusei Majutsushi; "The Death Mage Who Doesn't Want a Fourth Time") is a Japanese light novel series written by Densuke and illustrated by Ban!. It was serialized as a web novel published on the user-generated novel publishing website Shōsetsuka ni Narō from June 2015 to November 2021. It was later acquired by Hifumi Shobō who began publishing it under their Saga Forest light novel imprint in December 2016. A manga adaptation illustrated by Takehiro Kojima began serialization on Kadokawa's ComicWalker manga website in June 2018.

== Plot ==
Hiroto Amamiya was orphaned and brought up by an abusive uncle and is shy with almost no presence. On a school trip, he and his classmates are killed by terrorists. The god Rodcorte gathers the class and reincarnates them to another world with special powers, but does not notice Hiroto until the last second, meaning Rodcorte is almost out of gifts. Most of the gifts went to Hiroto Amemiya, a charismatic boy who quickly becomes the leader of the classmates.

Hiroto is reincarnated as Subject D-01, a test subject in a research facility in the world of Origin with death-related magic. He is subjected to painful experiments by scientists attempting to study his magic until he dies and rises as a zombie, going on a rampage of revenge until he is destroyed by his classmates, who did not recognize him.

Rodcorte reincarnates Hiroto and the classmates who died in Origin to a third world called Lambda. This time, Hiroto is a dhampir named Vandalieu who still has his death magic. He is determined to finally live a good life.

== Media ==
=== Light novel ===
Written by Densuke, The Death Mage was serialized on the user-generated novel publishing website Shōsetsuka ni Narō form June 30, 2015, to November 26, 2021. It was later acquired by Hifumi Shobō who began releasing it with illustrations by Ban! under their Saga Forest light novel imprint on December 15, 2016. Seventeen volumes have been released as of August 2026. The light novels are licensed in English by One Peace Books.

No.	Original release date	Original ISBN	North American release date	North American ISBN
1	December 15, 2016	978-4-89-199408-2	September 27, 2022	978-1-64273-202-3
2	May 15, 2017	978-4-89-199433-4	March 14, 2023	978-1-64273-243-6
3	January 20, 2018	978-4-89-199471-6	August 29, 2023	978-1-64273-293-1
4	July 15, 2018	978-4-89-199507-2	February 13, 2024	978-1-64273-348-8
5	March 28, 2019	978-4-89-199538-6	December 31, 2024	978-1-64273-402-7
6	October 25, 2019	978-4-89-199589-8	March 18, 2025	978-1-64273-458-4
7	October 15, 2020	978-4-89-199640-6	—	—
8	June 28, 2021	978-4-89-199717-5	—	—
9	March 22, 2022	978-4-89-199780-9	—	—
10	November 15, 2024	978-4-82-420321-2	—	—
11	February 15, 2025	978-4-82-420385-4	—	—
12	May 15, 2025	978-4-82-420428-8	—	—
13	August 12, 2025	978-4-82-420481-3	—	—
14	November 14, 2025	978-4-82-420538-4	—	—
15	February 14, 2026	978-4-82-420616-9	—	—
16	May 15, 2026	978-4-82-420668-8	—	—
17	August 12, 2026	978-4-82-420726-5	—	—

=== Manga ===
A manga adaptation illustrated by Takehiro Kojima began serialization on Kadokawa's ComicWalker manga website on June 24, 2018. The manga's chapters have been collected by Media Factory into sixteen tankōbon volumes as of August 2026. The manga adaptation is also licensed in English by One Peace Books.

No.	Original release date	Original ISBN	North American release date	North American ISBN
1	December 21, 2018	978-4-04-065200-9	May 9, 2023	978-1-64273-245-0
2	June 22, 2019	978-4-04-065775-2	September 12, 2023	978-1-64273-294-8
3	December 23, 2019	978-4-04-064211-6	November 7, 2023	978-1-64273-295-5
4	June 22, 2020	978-4-04-064614-5	March 5, 2024	978-1-64273-346-4
5	December 12, 2020	978-4-04-064979-5	May 21, 2024	978-1-64273-347-1
6	June 23, 2021	978-4-04-680486-0	August 6, 2024	978-1-64273-400-3
7	December 22, 2021	978-4-04-680964-3	December 10, 2024	978-1-64273-401-0
8	July 23, 2022	978-4-04-681458-6	April 22, 2025	978-1-64273-457-7
9	December 23, 2022	978-4-04-681991-8	May 27, 2026	978-1-64273-498-0
10	June 22, 2023	978-4-04-682524-7	—	—
11	December 21, 2023	978-4-04-683107-1	—	—
12	June 21, 2024	978-4-04-683682-3	—	—
13	December 23, 2024	978-4-04-684366-1	—	—
14	June 23, 2025	978-4-04-684825-3	—	—
15	January 23, 2026	978-4-04-685425-4	—	—
16	August 21, 2026	978-4-04-660374-6	—	—
