= The Tanaka Family Reincarnates =

Japanese light novel series

- First light novel volume cover

田中家、転生する。 (Tanaka-ke, Tensei Suru)
- Genre: Fantasy, isekai
- Novel series
- Written by: Choco
- Published by: Shōsetsuka ni Narō
- Original run: January 14, 2019 – present
- Light novel
- Written by: Choco
- Illustrated by: kaworu
- Published by: Fujimi Shobo
- English publisher: NA: J-Novel Club
- Imprint: Dragon Novels
- Original run: June 5, 2020 – present
- Volumes: 7
- Manga
- Written by: Choco
- Illustrated by: Michiru Katō
- Published by: ASCII Media Works
- Imprint: Flos Comics
- Magazine: Dengeki Maoh
- Original run: June 27, 2020 – present
- Volumes: 8

The Tanaka Family Reincarnates (Japanese: 田中家、転生する。, Hepburn: Tanaka-ke, Tensei Suru) is a Japanese light novel series written by Choco and illustrated by Kaworu. It began serialization on the user-generated novel publishing website Shōsetsuka ni Narō in January 2019. It was later acquired by Fujimi Shobo who began publishing it under their Dragon Novels imprint in June 2020. A manga adaptation illustrated by Michiru Katō began serialization in ASCII Media Works' seinen manga magazine Dengeki Maoh in June 2020.

== Premise ==
An ordinary family that loves cats, the Tanaka family, was one day killed in an earthquake. When they woke up, they had reincarnated as the Stuart noble family in another world. Though they dressed in Western style, they have the memories of their previous Japanese lives.

== Characters ==
=== Stuart Family ===
Formerly the Tanaka family, they all woke up in their reincarnated bodies roughly at the same time. With their modern values setting them apart from the medieval kingdom they live in now, the Stuarts attempt to continue their former lives.

Leonard
An Earl, who cannot go against his stubborn wife.
Melsa Stuart
Matriarch of the Stuart family. She never had grandchildren as Mrs. Tanaka, even with her children in their 30s; this makes her have an unhealthy obsession with forcing her kids to get hitched just for that. She couldn't care about the kids' happiness unless they were in danger.
Emma Stuart
Only daughter of the Stuart family, she was previously Minato Tanaka. Prince has a crush on her, but she can't see it as he's just a child to her; she is instead smitten with the king.
William Stuart
Youngest son and formerly Heita Tanaka.
George Stuart
Oldest son and formerly Wataru Tanaka. He kept the peace in the Tanaka family.
Arban
He is Leonard's brother and the only member of the Stuarts not to be reincarnated.

=== Stuarts Pets ===
Violet
A pet spider Emma had before regaining her memories. Violet is very smart and caring of her owner; webbing up enemies when needed.
Komei
Minato 's cat and leader of the litter. When she died of old age Komei wished to have 8 lives dedicated to the family, resulting in her litter being reborn as the size of horses in the new world. Emma can often interpret what Komei is trying to tell her by feeling.
Kan
Cho
Ryu

=== Imperial Japan ===
A country in the other world that is heavily implied to have been founded by previous transmigrators from Japan. Their language is the same and so are the names and culture. The Stuarts set up trade with the empire in exchange for rice, which they deeply miss eating.

== Media ==
=== Light novel ===
Written by Choco, The Tanaka Family Reincarnates began serialization on the user-generated novel publishing website Shōsetsuka ni Narō on January 14, 2019. It was later acquired by Fujimi Shobo who began releasing it with illustrations by Kaworu under their Dragon Novels light novel imprint on June 5, 2020. Seven volumes have been released as of December 2024. The series is licensed in English by J-Novel Club.

No.	Original release date	Original ISBN	North American release date	North American ISBN
1	June 5, 2020	978-4-04-073596-2	December 13, 2024	978-1-71-831323-1
2	January 5, 2021	978-4-04-073953-3	February 28, 2025	978-1-71-831325-5
3	August 5, 2021	978-4-04-074162-8	July 7, 2025	978-1-71-831327-9
4	May 2, 2022	978-4-04-074523-7	October 6, 2025	978-1-71-831329-3
5	March 3, 2023	978-4-04-074897-9	December 30, 2025	978-1-71-831331-6
6	February 5, 2024	978-4-04-075334-8	April 3, 2026	978-1-71-831333-0
7	December 5, 2024	978-4-04-075629-5; 978-4-04-075630-1 (SE)	July 8, 2026	978-1-71-831335-4

=== Manga ===
A manga adaptation illustrated by Michiru Katō began serialization in ASCII Media Works' seinen manga magazine Dengeki Maoh on June 27, 2020. The manga's chapters have been collected into eight tankōbon volumes as of June 2026.

No.	Release date	ISBN
1	July 5, 2021	978-4-04-680524-9
2	February 4, 2022	978-4-04-681104-2
3	October 5, 2022	978-4-04-681815-7
4	August 4, 2023	978-4-04-682634-3
5	May 2, 2024	978-4-04-683635-9
6	January 4, 2025	978-4-04-684457-6
7	November 5, 2025	978-4-04-685363-9
8	June 5, 2026	978-4-04-660235-0

== Reception ==
By December 2024, the series had over 600,000 copies in circulation.
