= The Villainess Stans the Heroes =

Japanese light novel series by Yamori Mitikusa

- Cover of the first light novel volume cover

悪役令嬢は今日も華麗に暗躍する 追放後も推しのために悪党として支援します! (Akuyaku Reijō wa Kyō mo Karei ni An'yaku suru: Tsuihō-go mo Oshi no Tame ni Akutō to shite Shien shimasu)
- Genre: Fantasy, isekai, romantic comedy
- Novel series
- Written by: Yamori Mitikusa
- Published by: Shōsetsuka ni Narō (self-published)
- Original run: 2 May 2020 – 12 January 2023
- Light novel
- Written by: Yamori Mitikusa
- Illustrated by: Kaoru Harugano
- Published by: Fujimi Shobo
- Imprint: Kadokawa Books
- Original run: 10 November 2020 – 8 May 2021
- Volumes: 2
- Manga
- Written by: Yamori Mitikusa
- Illustrated by: Tsubasa Takamatsu
- Published by: Square Enix
- English publisher: NA: Yen Press
- Imprint: Gangan Comics Online
- Magazine: Gangan Online
- Original run: 27 February 2021 – 26 July 2025
- Volumes: 6

The Villainess Stans the Heroes (悪役令嬢は今日も華麗に暗躍する 追放後も推しのために悪党として支援します!, Akuyaku Reijō wa Kyō mo Karei ni An'yaku suru: Tsuihō-go mo Oshi no Tame ni Akutō to shite Shien shimasu; lit. "The Villainess Operates Splendidly Behind the Scenes Again Today: Even After Being Exiled, She Supports Her Fave by Playing the Villain") is a Japanese light novel series written by Yamori Mitikusa and illustrated by Kaoru Harugano. Originally published as a web novel on Shōsetsuka ni Narō from May 2020 to January 2023, it was published in two volumes by Fujimi Shobo under their Kadokawa Books imprint from November 2020 to May 2021. A manga adaptation illustrated by Tsubasa Takamatsu was serialized on Square Enix's Gangan Online website from February 2021 to July 2025, with its chapters collected into six volumes.

== Plot ==
After being killed in a merchandising incident, a Japanese woman is reincarnated as Eldea Euclair, the villainess of a mobile game she was a superfan of. After fulfilling her newfound role in the game and remaining longer than the game's original plot expects, she disguises herself as financier Ellua and begins involving herself in the heroes' adventures with advance knowledge of the game's lore and a new partner, a dhampir assassin named Albert.

== Media ==
=== Light novel ===
Written by Yamori Mitikusa, The Villainess Stans the Heroes was originally published as a web novel on Shōsetsuka ni Narō from 2 May 2020 to 12 January 2023. It was later released as a light novel illustrated by Kaoru Harugano, with the first volume released by Fujimi Shobo under their Kadokawa Books imprint on 10 November 2020.

No.	Original release date	Original ISBN	English release date	English ISBN
1	10 November 2020	978-4-04-073892-5	—	—
2	8 May 2021	978-4-04-074006-5	—	—

=== Manga ===
A manga adaptation illustrated by Tsubasa Takamatsu was serialized on Square Enix's Gangan Online website from 27 February 2021, to 26 July 2025, with the first tankōbon volume released on 12 July 2021. In September 2022, Yen Press announced that it has licensed the manga for English publication, with the first volume being released on 21 March 2023. The sixth and final tankōbon volume was released on 8 August 2025.

No.	Original release date	Original ISBN	English release date	English ISBN
1	12 July 2021	978-4-7575-7373-4	21 March 2023	978-1-9753-6106-8
2	12 January 2022	978-4-7575-7682-7	31 October 2023	978-1-9753-7356-6
3	12 January 2023	978-4-7575-8345-0	20 February 2024	978-1-9753-7552-2
4	12 March 2024	978-4-7575-9099-1	25 March 2025	979-8-8554-1018-1
5	12 November 2024	978-4-7575-9513-2	20 January 2026	979-8-8554-2060-9
6	8 August 2025	978-4-3010-0008-2	27 October 2026	979-8-8554-3617-4

== Reception ==
Jean-Karlo Lemus and Rebecca Silverman of Anime News Network gave the manga 3 and 2.5 out of 5 stars; Lemus called the work "a big, fat sugar rush. But it's a fun one", and Silverman said "Fluff is not bad. Neither is this introductory volume." Silverman previously gave it a C overall grade (C in story and B− in art) in a previous ANN review, concluding that "It simply doesn't come together as well as it ought, leaving this volume feeling somehow less than the sum of its parts". Sakura Eries of The Fandom Post gave the first and third volumes B grades in content, art, and text/translation, and a B+ in packaging.

Jenni Lada of Siliconera praised the amount of focus provided to secondary characters like Albert, Chikusa, and Cort, noting that the setting's nature as a gacha game allowed for storylines related to individual characters and special events, though acknowledged Ellua's "standout" nature citing her intelligence and her care for the heroes. Lemus said Eldea's fandom towards the characters "lends a nice romantic twist since Albert knows he's Eldea's favorite. I'm honestly surprised they're not already a couple," and Eries said that "Ellua/Albert fans will enjoy watching them risk everything to fight for each other". However, Lemus criticized the low degree of Eldea's on-screen intelligent and villainous actions throughout Volume 1, while Eries criticized the flat personality of the villains of Volume 3. Silverman found that the work's general premise wasn't really distinguishing enough amongst villainess works, though Lemus digressed that the premise of a fangirl involving her knowledge of the game to get happy endings for the heroes was unique.

Eries and Silverman criticized the quality of the writing, with the former voicing concerns about pacing and goal cohesion, and the latter centered on the first volume's lack of effort made in trying to extend "beyond total fluff" or presenting full world-building, Eries criticized the first volume's use of a subtitle as redundant due to Eldea's then-lack of on-screen villainous actions, while Lemus called the title "such a wordy eyesore". Eries praised the illustrations' detail and expressions, but Silverman found the art relatively busy while admitting it did not reach the point of interfering with readability and that some of it was good.
