= The Fed-Up Office Lady Wants to Serve the Villainess =

Japanese manga series

- First tankōbon volume cover

限界OLさんは悪役令嬢さまに仕えたい (Genkai OL-san wa Akuyaku Reijō-sama ni Tsukaetai)
- Genre: Isekai; Yuri
- Manga
- Written by: Nekotarou
- Published by: Akita Shoten
- English publisher: NA: Seven Seas Entertainment
- Imprint: Young Champion Comics
- Magazine: Dokodemo Young Champion
- Original run: August 23, 2022 – present
- Volumes: 6

The Fed-Up Office Lady Wants to Serve the Villainess (Japanese: 限界OLさんは悪役令嬢さまに仕えたい, Hepburn: Genkai OL-san wa Akuyaku Reijō-sama ni Tsukaetai) is a Japanese manga series written and illustrated by Nekotarou. It began serialization in Akita Shoten's digital seinen manga magazine Dokodemo Young Champion in August 2022.

== Plot ==
Natori Midori is a temporary worker who puts a lot of effort into everything she does. One day, the company that she had been working at for three years abruptly terminates her contract. Feeling depressed and wondering if there will ever be a job she can dedicate herself to, Natori opens a mobile game that she had been playing, only to be magically summoned into its fictional world. She lands beside the person who summoned her: Lapis Tenebrae, a cruel and ruthless villainess who betrays the game's protagonist. In a desperate situation, Natori pretends that her knowledge of the game's plot is a clairvoyant psychic ability, and uses it to help Lapis avoid the danger that was about to befall her. As a result, Lapis takes a liking to Natori, and she begins working as Lapis' secretary. In addition to navigating her secretarial duties, Natori begins to see another side of Lapis, and dedicates herself to saving Lapis from a plot-mandated death.

== Publication ==
Written and illustrated by Nekotarou, The Fed-Up Office Lady Wants to Serve the Villainess began serialization on Akita Shoten's digital seinen manga magazine Dokodemo Young Champion on August 23, 2022. Its chapters have been collected into six tankōbon volumes as of April 2026.

On February 12, 2025, Seven Seas Entertainment announced that they had licensed the series for English publication beginning in August 2025.

No.	Original release date	Original ISBN	North American release date	North American ISBN
1	February 20, 2023	978-4-253-31011-6	August 26, 2025	979-8-89561-111-1
Chapters 1–5; Bonus
2	September 27, 2023	978-4-253-31012-3	December 16, 2025	979-8-89561-112-8
Chapters 6–11; Bonus
3	May 20, 2024	978-4-253-31013-0	April 28, 2026	979-8-89561-113-5
Chapters 12–17; Bonus
4	March 27, 2025	978-4-253-31014-7	August 18, 2026	979-8-89561-529-4
Chapters 18–23; Bonus
5	October 27, 2025	978-4-253-00481-7	December 22, 2026	979-8-89863-245-8
6	April 27, 2026	978-4-253-01320-8	May 18, 2027	979-8-90209-045-8

== Reception ==
The series was nominated for the ninth Next Manga Awards in the web category.
