= Cross-Dressing Villainess Cecilia Sylvie =

Japanese light novel series

- Cover of the first light novel volume

悪役令嬢、セシリア・シルビィは死にたくないので男装することにした。 (Akuyaku Reijō, Seshiria Shirubyi wa Shinitakunai node Dansō Suru Koto ni Shita)
- Genre: Isekai; Romantic comedy
- Novel series
- Written by: Hiroro Akizakura
- Published by: Shōsetsuka ni Narō
- Original run: March 15, 2019 – May 24, 2022
- Light novel
- Written by: Hiroro Akizakura
- Illustrated by: Dangmill
- Published by: Kadokawa Shoten
- English publisher: NA: Yen Press
- Imprint: Kadokawa Beans Bunko
- Original run: August 1, 2019 – present
- Volumes: 5 + 1 side stories
- Manga
- Written by: Hiroro Akizakura
- Illustrated by: Shino Akiyama
- Published by: Kadokawa Shoten
- English publisher: NA: Yen Press
- Imprint: Flos Comic
- Magazine: ComicWalker; Niconico Seiga
- Original run: May 22, 2020 – present
- Volumes: 9
- icon

Cross-Dressing Villainess Cecilia Sylvie (Note: Japanese: 悪役令嬢、セシリア・シルビィは死にたくないので男装することにした。, Hepburn: Akuyaku Reijō, Seshiria Shirubyi wa Shinitakunai node Dansō Suru Koto ni Shita) is a Japanese light novel series written by Hiroro Akizakura. The series originated on the Shōsetsuka ni Narō website in March 2020, before being published in print with illustrations by Dangmill by Kadokawa Shoten beginning in August 2019. A manga adaptation, illustrated by Shino Akiyama, began serialization on the ComicWalker and Niconico Seiga websites in May 2020.

== Media ==
=== Light novel ===
Written by Hiroro Akizakura, the series was published on the novel posting website Shōsetsuka ni Narō from March 15, 2019, to May 24, 2022. The series was later acquired by Kadokawa Shoten, who began publishing the series in print with illustrations by Dangmill on August 1, 2019. As of August 2025, five volumes and a side stories collection volume have been released.

In May 2021, Yen Press announced that they licensed the series for English publication.

==== Volumes ====
No.	Original release date	Original ISBN	English release date	English ISBN
1	August 1, 2019	978-4-04-108518-9	January 4, 2022	978-1-9753-3421-5
2	August 1, 2020	978-4-04-109394-8	April 26, 2022	978-1-9753-3423-9
3	June 1, 2021	978-4-04-111452-0	November 22, 2022	978-1-9753-4292-0
4	February 1, 2022	978-4-04-112242-6	April 18, 2023	978-1-9753-6399-4
5	September 1, 2022	978-4-04-112899-2	August 22, 2023	978-1-9753-6859-3
Ex	August 29, 2025	978-4-04-116355-9	April 13, 2027	979-8-8554-3819-2

=== Manga ===
A manga adaptation, illustrated by Shino Akiyama, began serialization on the ComicWalker and Niconico Seiga websites under Kadokawa Shoten's Flos Comic imprint on May 22, 2020. As of October 2026, the manga's individual chapters have been collected into nine tankōbon volumes.

In August 2021, Yen Press announced that they also licensed the manga for English publication.

==== Volumes ====
No.	Original release date	Original ISBN	English release date	English ISBN
1	August 5, 2020	978-4-04-064778-4	March 29, 2022	978-1-9753-3659-2
2	December 28, 2020	978-4-04-680142-5	August 23, 2022	978-1-9753-3661-5
3	August 5, 2021	978-4-04-680677-2	February 21, 2023	978-1-9753-4290-6
4	April 5, 2022	978-4-04-681299-5	June 20, 2023	978-1-9753-6745-9
5	February 17, 2023	978-4-04-682000-6	December 12, 2023	978-1-9753-7661-1
6	December 14, 2023	978-4-04-683134-7	November 19, 2024	979-8-8554-0636-8
7	October 17, 2024	978-4-04-684110-0	November 25, 2025	979-8-8554-2023-4
8	September 17, 2025	978-4-04-685163-5	April 27, 2027	979-8-8554-3835-2
9	October 5, 2026	978-4-04-660622-8	—	—

== Reception ==
Rebecca Silverman of Anime News Network liked the characters, though she felt it shared many tropes common in similar series. Renee Scott of School Library Journal felt that the story was similar to other similar works, but nonetheless said it was a "fun read". Danica Davidson of Otaku USA felt the beginning of the story had too many details, but that later parts of the story improved. Davidson also praised the lead characters.
