= Devilish Darlings Portal Fantasy =

Japanese manga series

- Tankōbon volume cover

異世界性活のススメ (Isekai Seikatsu no Susume)
- Genre: Fantasy comedy; Isekai
- Manga
- Written by: Minoru Mitsuba
- Published by: Takeshobo
- English publisher: NA: Seven Seas Entertainment
- Imprint: Bamboo Comics
- Magazine: Monthly Kissca
- Original run: July 6, 2018 – February 7, 2020
- Volumes: 1

Devilish Darlings Portal Fantasy (Japanese: 異世界性活のススメ, Hepburn: Isekai Seikatsu no Susume) is a Japanese manga series written and illustrated by Minoru Mitsuba. It was serialized in Takeshobo's Monthly Kissca from July 2018 to February 2020, with its chapters collected in a single tankōbon volume. In North America, the manga was licensed for English release by Seven Seas Entertainment.

== Publication ==
Written and illustrated by Devilish Darlings Portal Fantasy was serialized in Takeshobo's Monthly Kissca from July 6, 2018, to February 7, 2020. Takeshobo collected its chapters in a single tankōbon volume, released on May 8, 2020.

In North America, the manga was licensed for English release by Seven Seas Entertainment and released under their Ghost Ship mature imprint on July 6, 2021.

=== Chapter list ===
No.	Original release date	Original ISBN	English release date	English ISBN
1	May 8, 2020	978-4-8019-6935-3	July 6, 2021	978-1-64827-490-9
1. "Welcome to Another World!!" (ようこそ異世界へ‼, Yōkoso Isekai e‼); 2. "The Second Half-Devil" (ふたりめの半魔族, Futari-me no Hāfu Debiru); 3. "Can Romance Bloom on an Adventure?!" (探索でドキドキ!?, Tansaku de Doki Doki!?); 4. "Werewolves Love Humans!" (狼女は人恋しい, Ueaurufu wa Hitokoishī); 5. "Welcome to the Half-Devil Village" (ようこそ半魔族の村へ, Yōkoso-han Mazoku no Mura e); 6. "Goodbye, Another World" (さよなら異世界, Sayonara Isekai)
