= The Diary of a Middle-Aged Sage's Carefree Life in Another World =

Japanese light novel series

- First light novel volume cover

アラフォー賢者の異世界生活日記 (Arafō Kenja no Isekai Seikatsu Nikki)
- Genre: High fantasy; Isekai
- Novel series
- Written by: Yasukiyo Kotobuki
- Published by: Shōsetsuka ni Narō
- Original run: February 7, 2016 – present
- Light novel
- Written by: Yasukiyo Kotobuki
- Illustrated by: Johndee
- Published by: Media Factory
- English publisher: NA: J-Novel Club
- Imprint: MF Books
- Original run: September 23, 2016 – present
- Volumes: 21
- Manga
- Written by: Yasukiyo Kotobuki
- Illustrated by: 888
- Published by: Media Factory
- Imprint: MF Comics
- Magazine: ComicWalker (Note: ComicWalker changed its name to KadoComi (カドコミ) in December 2023.)
- Original run: April 25, 2018 – present
- Volumes: 9
- Manga

The Diary of a Middle-Aged Teacher's Carefree Life in Another World
- Written by: Yasukiyo Kotobuki
- Illustrated by: Maneki
- Published by: Square Enix
- English publisher: NA: Square Enix
- Imprint: Gangan Comics UP!
- Magazine: Manga Up!
- Original run: October 16, 2018 – present
- Volumes: 18
- Light novel

Arafō Kenja no Isekai Seikatsu Nikki Zero: Sword and Sorcery World
- Written by: Yasukiyo Kotobuki
- Illustrated by: Johndee
- Published by: Media Factory
- Imprint: MF Books
- Original run: August 25, 2023 – present
- Volumes: 3
- Manga

Arafō Kenja no Isekai Seikatsu Nikki Zero: Sword and Sorcery World
- Written by: Yasukiyo Kotobuki
- Illustrated by: Piyoko Hatori
- Published by: Frontier Works
- Magazine: FW Comics Alter
- Original run: December 15, 2025 – present
- Anime television series
- Directed by: Takayuki Inagaki
- Written by: Hiroko Kanasugi
- Studio: Yanchester
- Original run: January 2027 – scheduled

The Diary of a Middle-Aged Sage's Carefree Life in Another World (Japanese: アラフォー賢者の異世界生活日記, Hepburn: Arafō Kenja no Isekai Seikatsu Nikki) is a Japanese light novel series written by Yasukiyo Kotobuki and illustrated by Johndee. It began serialization on the user-generated novel publishing website Shōsetsuka ni Narō in February 2016. It was later acquired by Media Factory who began publishing it under their MF Books imprint in September 2016. A manga adaptation illustrated by 888 began serialization on Kadokawa's ComicWalker manga website in April 2018. A second manga adaptation illustrated by Maneki titled The Diary of a Middle-Aged Teacher's Carefree Life in Another World began serialization on Square Enix's Manga Up! manga website and app in October of the same year. An anime television series adaptation produced by Yanchester is set to premiere in January 2027.

== Plot ==
Satoshi Osako, a middle-aged man, loses his job and spends his days immersed in an online game, becoming a top-ranked player. Upon defeating the game's final boss, he is killed in the real world and reincarnated in a fantasy world as his in-game character, the powerful mage Zelos Merlin, retaining all of his abilities and knowledge.

After awakening in a dangerous forest, Zelos uses his overwhelming power to survive and begins traveling through the new world. Despite possessing extraordinary magical strength, he wishes to live a quiet and uneventful life. However, his abilities quickly draw attention when he rescues an elderly nobleman from bandits. Impressed, the man asks Zelos to become the private tutor of his granddaughter, Celestina van Solistia, a noble girl who is unable to use magic. As Zelos takes on the role of teacher, he becomes involved in the affairs of the nobility, all while continuing to seek a peaceful life.

== Characters ==
Zelos Merlin (ゼロス・マーリン, Zerosu Mārin)
Voiced by: Tomokazu Sugita

== Media ==
=== Light novel ===
Written by Yasukiyo Kotobuki, The Diary of a Middle-Aged Sage's Carefree Life in Another World began serialization on the user-generated novel publishing website Shōsetsuka ni Narō on February 7, 2016. It was later acquired by Media Factory who began releasing it with illustrations by Johndee under their MF Books light novel imprint on September 23, 2016. Twenty-one volumes have been released as of April 2026. The light novels are licensed in English by J-Novel Club.

A spin-off light novel series, titled Arafō Kenja no Isekai Seikatsu Nikki Zero: Sword and Sorcery World, began publication under the same imprint on August 25, 2023.

==== Volumes ====
No.	Original release date	Original ISBN	North American release date	North American ISBN
1	September 23, 2016	978-4-04-068641-7	December 14, 2023	978-1-7183-7384-6
2	February 25, 2017	978-4-04-069086-5	March 20, 2024	978-1-7183-7386-0
3	April 25, 2017	978-4-04-069188-6	July 31, 2024	978-1-7183-7388-4
4	August 25, 2017	978-4-04-069404-7	October 30, 2024	978-1-7183-7390-7
5	November 25, 2017	978-4-04-069589-1	February 19, 2025	978-1-7183-7392-1
6	April 25, 2018	978-4-04-069867-0	May 21, 2025	978-1-7183-7394-5
7	September 25, 2018	978-4-04-065169-9	August 27, 2025	978-1-7183-7396-9
8	December 25, 2018	978-4-04-065390-7	December 3, 2025	978-1-7183-7398-3
9	April 25, 2019	978-4-04-065683-0	March 11, 2026	978-1-7183-7400-3
10	August 24, 2019	978-4-04-064056-3	June 6, 2026	978-1-7183-7404-1
11	December 25, 2019	978-4-04-064269-7	September 16, 2026	978-1-7183-7404-1
12	April 25, 2020	978-4-04-064581-0	December 21, 2026	978-1-7183-7406-5
13	August 21, 2020	978-4-04-064869-9	—	—
14	March 25, 2021	978-4-04-680322-1	—	—
15	September 25, 2021	978-4-04-680764-9	—	—
16	February 25, 2022	978-4-04-681174-5	—	—
17	September 25, 2022	978-4-04-681744-0	—	—
18	April 25, 2023	978-4-04-682418-9	—	—
19	December 25, 2023	978-4-04-683162-0	—	—
20	February 25, 2025	978-4-04-684567-2	—	—
21	April 24, 2026	978-4-04-660084-4	—	—

==== Arafō Kenja no Isekai Seikatsu Nikki Zero: Sword and Sorcery World ====
No.	Release date	ISBN
1	August 25, 2023	978-4-04-682763-0
2	August 23, 2024	978-4-04-683964-0
3	August 24, 2025	978-4-04-685087-4

=== Manga ===
A manga adaptation illustrated by 888 began serialization on Kadokawa's ComicWalker manga website on April 25, 2018. The manga's chapters have been collected by Media Factory into nine tankōbon volumes as of September 2026.

A second manga adaptation illustrated by Maneki, titled The Diary of a Middle-Aged Teacher's Carefree Life in Another World, began serialization on Square Enix's Manga Up! manga website and app on October 16 of the same year. The second manga's chapters have been collected into eighteen tankōbon volumes as of June 2026. The second manga is published digitally in North America by Square Enix via their Manga Up! Global app.

A manga adaptation of the spin-off series, illustrated by Piyoko Hatori, began serialization on Frontier Works's FW Comics Alter manga website on December 15, 2025.

==== Volumes ====
No.	Release date	ISBN
1	November 21, 2018	978-4-04-065030-2
2	July 22, 2019	978-4-04-065822-3
3	June 22, 2020	978-4-04-064465-3
4	March 22, 2021	978-4-04-680289-7
5	December 22, 2021	978-4-04-680887-5
6	October 21, 2022	978-4-04-681455-5
7	November 22, 2023	978-4-04-682525-4
8	February 20, 2025	978-4-04-684495-8
9	September 18, 2026	978-4-04-660476-7

==== The Diary of a Middle-Aged Teacher's Carefree Life in Another World ====
No.	Release date	ISBN
1	March 13, 2019	978-4-7575-6042-0
2	July 12, 2019	978-4-7575-6196-0
3	February 12, 2020	978-4-7575-6509-8
4	July 7, 2020	978-4-7575-6726-9
5	December 7, 2020	978-4-7575-6982-9
6	May 7, 2021	978-4-7575-7235-5
7	October 7, 2021	978-4-7575-7506-6
8	March 7, 2022	978-4-7575-7783-1
9	August 5, 2022	978-4-7575-8051-0
10	February 7, 2023	978-4-7575-8375-7
11	July 6, 2023	978-4-7575-8640-6
12	December 7, 2023	978-4-7575-8929-2
13	May 7, 2024	978-4-7575-9169-1
14	October 7, 2024	978-4-7575-9448-7
15	March 7, 2025	978-4-7575-9709-9
16	August 6, 2025	978-4-7575-9983-3
17	January 7, 2026	978-4-301-00253-6
18	June 5, 2026	978-4-301-00549-0

=== Anime ===
An anime television series adaptation was announced on April 22, 2026. The series will be produced by Yanchester and directed by Takayuki Inagaki, with Hiroko Kanasugi handling series composition and Mariko Fujita designing the characters. It is set to premiere in January 2027.

== Reception ==
By April 2022, the series has over 2.2 million copies in circulation.
