= I Was Sold Dirt Cheap, But My Power Level Is Off the Charts =

Japanese light novel series

- Cover of the first light novel volume

クラス最安値で売られた俺は、実は最強パラメーター (Kurasu Saiyasune de Urareta Ore wa, Jitsu wa Saikyō Paramētā)
- Genre: Isekai; Mecha
- Novel series
- Written by: Ryoma
- Published by: Kakuyomu
- Original run: May 7, 2020 – present
- Light novel
- Written by: Ryoma
- Illustrated by: Susumu Kuroi
- Published by: ASCII Media Works
- Imprint: Dengeki no Shin Bungei
- Original run: January 16, 2021 – present
- Volumes: 4
- Manga
- Written by: Ryoma
- Illustrated by: Cambria Bakuhatsu Tarou
- Published by: Kadokawa Shoten
- English publisher: NA: One Peace Books
- Magazine: Young Ace Up
- Original run: April 22, 2021 – present
- Volumes: 9

I Was Sold Dirt Cheap, But My Power Level Is Off the Charts (Japanese: クラス最安値で売られた俺は、実は最強パラメーター, Hepburn: Kurasu Saiyasune de Urareta Ore wa, Jitsu wa Saikyō Paramētā) is a Japanese light novel series written by Ryoma. The series originated on the Kakuyomu website in May 2020, before being published in print with illustrations by Susumu Kuroi by ASCII Media Works beginning in January 2021. A manga adaptation, illustrated by Cambria Bakuhatsu Tarou, began serialization on the Young Ace Up website in April 2021.

== Media ==
=== Light novel ===
Written by Ryoma, the series began publication on the novel posting website Kakuyomu on May 7, 2020. The series was later acquired by ASCII Media Works, who began publishing the series in print with illustrations by Susumu Kuroi on January 16, 2021. As of August 2022, four volumes have been released.

==== Volumes ====
No.	Japanese release date	Japanese ISBN
1	January 16, 2021	978-4-04-913535-0
2	May 17, 2021	978-4-04-913825-2
3	October 15, 2021	978-4-04-914048-4
4	August 17, 2022	978-4-04-914442-0

=== Manga ===
A manga adaptation, illustrated by Cambria Bakuhatsu Tarou, began serialization on Kadokawa Shoten's website Young Ace Up on April 22, 2021. As of February 2026, the series' individual chapters have been collected into nine tankōbon volumes.

One Peace Books is publishing the manga in English.

==== Volumes ====
No.	Original release date	Original ISBN	English release date	English ISBN
1	October 8, 2021	978-4-04-111919-8	October 8, 2024	978-1-64-273383-9
2	April 8, 2022	978-4-04-112382-9	December 3, 2024	978-1-64-273387-7
3	September 9, 2022	978-4-04-112716-2	April 15, 2025	978-1-64-273442-3
4	January 10, 2023	978-4-04-113254-8	July 15, 2025	978-1-64-273443-0
5	August 10, 2023	978-4-04-113813-7	May 27, 2026	978-1-64-273497-3
6	August 9, 2024	978-4-04-115177-8	—	—
7	April 10, 2025	978-4-04-115936-1	—	—
8	September 10, 2025	978-4-04-116520-1	—	—
9	February 10, 2026	978-4-04-116994-0	—	—

== Reception ==
Danica Davidson of Otaku USA liked the main protagonist, Yuta. Davidson felt the story had some tropes common in isekai works, but she also felt that it was fast-paced and flowed well. Renee Scott of School Library Journal liked the story and characters and was interested in seeing how the story progresses. Rebecca Silverman of Anime News Network felt the story had a lot of tropes common in isekai works, but nonetheless enjoyed it, stating that she "[found] it easy to keep reading". Jean-Karlo Lemus of the same website described the series as "Broken Blade, but with the usual isekai twists" and praised the story, though he criticized the title.
