= Wicked Trapper =

Japanese manga series

- Wicked Trapper: Hunter of Heroes
- First tankōbon volume cover

禍つ罠師の勇者狩り (Magatsu Wanashi no Yūshagari)
- Genre: Dark fantasy; Isekai
- Manga
- Written by: Wadapen
- Published by: Shueisha
- English publisher: NA: Seven Seas Entertainment
- Magazine: Ultra Jump
- Original run: November 19, 2019 – September 16, 2022
- Volumes: 4

Wicked Trapper: Hunter of Heroes (Japanese: 禍つ罠師の勇者狩り, Hepburn: Magatsu Wanashi no Yūshagari) is a Japanese manga series written and illustrated by Wadapen. It was serialized in Shueisha's seinen manga magazine Ultra Jump from November 2019 to September 2022, with its chapters collected in four tankōbon volumes.

== Publication ==
Wicked Trapper: Hunter of Heroes, written and illustrated by Wadapen, ran in Shueisha's seinen manga magazine Ultra Jump from November 19, 2019, to September 16, 2022. Shueisha collected its chapters in four tankōbon volumes, released from April 17, 2020, to November 17, 2022.

In September 2021, Seven Seas Entertainment announced that they had licensed the manga for English physical and digital releases in North America and the first volume is set to be released in March 2022.

=== Volumes ===
No.	Original release date	Original ISBN	English release date	English ISBN
1	April 17, 2020	978-4-08-891129-8	June 28, 2022	978-1-63858-180-2
2	September 17, 2021	978-4-08-891709-2	April 25, 2023	978-1-63858-335-6
3	May 18, 2022	978-4-08-892199-0	October 17, 2023	978-1-63858-759-0
4	November 17, 2022	978-4-08-892504-2	April 30, 2024	979-8-88843-421-5
