= To Another World... with Land Mines! =

Japanese light novel series

- First light novel volume cover

異世界転移、地雷付き。 (Isekai Teni, Jirai Tsuki)
- Genre: Fantasy, isekai
- Novel series
- Written by: Mizuho Itsuki
- Published by: Shōsetsuka ni Narō
- Original run: January 1, 2018 – present
- Light novel
- Written by: Mizuho Itsuki
- Illustrated by: Neko Nekobyō
- Published by: Fujimi Shobo
- English publisher: NA: J-Novel Club
- Imprint: Dragon Novels
- Original run: February 5, 2019 – present
- Volumes: 15
- Manga
- Written by: Mizuho Itsuki
- Illustrated by: Relucy
- Published by: Kadokawa Shoten
- English publisher: NA: J-Novel Club
- Imprint: Kadokawa Comics A
- Magazine: Shōnen Ace Plus
- Original run: October 25, 2019 – present
- Volumes: 3

To Another World... with Land Mines! (異世界転移、地雷付き。, Isekai Teni, Jirai Tsuki) is a Japanese light novel series written by Mizuho Itsuki and illustrated by Neko Nekobyō. It began serialization on the user-generated novel publishing website Shōsetsuka ni Narō in January 2018. It was later acquired by Fujimi Shobo who began publishing it under their Dragon Novels imprint in February 2019. A manga adaptation illustrated by Relucy began serialization on Kadokawa Shoten's Shōnen Ace Plus manga website in October 2019.

== Plot ==
After Naofumi Kimiya dies in a tragic bus accident on a school trip, along with his entire class, they appear as bodyless souls, in front of a being who announces himself as an evil god, but not actually evil. They are about to be transported into a fantasy-like world, and the evil god gives each a pool of points they can spend on fantasy like skills. It also seems he's willing to entertain creating new skills on request. Naofumi notices that some of the skills seem very overpowered, although the god explicitly said there are no cheat skills. Even though it's expensive, Naofumi decides to spend 20 points out of his pool of 150 on a help guide, which allows him to see the small letters attached to each skill, and indeed it turns out that all seemingly cheat skills are actually booby traps, and if that's not enough, it seems that some of those land mine skills spell trouble not just for the person who has them, but also the people around them.

After being transported into the other world along with his childhood friends Haruka and Tomoya with nothing more than their clothes and a few coins that would only last for a few days, the three must find a way to start from scratch, make a living and survive, and on top of that, they also need to avoid running into their former classmates, who might have picked some of those land mine skills.

== Media ==
=== Light novel ===
Written by Mizuho Itsuki, To Another World... with Land Mines! began serialization on the user-generated novel publishing website Shōsetsuka ni Narō on January 1, 2018. It was later acquired by Fujimi Shobo who began releasing it with illustrations by Neko Nekobyō under their Dragon Novels light novel imprint on February 5, 2019. Fourteen volumes have been released as of April 2026.

During their Anime NYC 2021 panel, J-Novel Club announced that they licensed the light novels for English publication.

No.	Original release date	Original ISBN	North American release date	North American ISBN
1	February 5, 2019	978-4-04-073069-1	February 15, 2022	978-1-71-838797-3
2	June 5, 2019	978-4-04-073070-7	May 3, 2022	978-1-71-838799-7
3	December 5, 2019	978-4-04-073410-1	July 19, 2022	978-1-71-838801-7
4	July 4, 2020	978-4-04-073707-2	October 18, 2022	978-1-71-838803-1
5	April 5, 2021	978-4-04-074044-7	January 3, 2023	978-1-71-838805-5
6	December 3, 2021	978-4-04-074335-6	April 4, 2023	978-1-71-838807-9
7	June 3, 2022	978-4-04-074554-1	July 4, 2023	978-1-71-838809-3
8	March 3, 2023	978-4-04-074895-5	November 13, 2023	978-1-71-838811-6
9	September 5, 2023	978-4-04-075112-2	September 9, 2024	978-1-71-838813-0
10	February 5, 2024	978-4-04-075330-0	January 6, 2025	978-1-71-838815-4
11	September 5, 2024	978-4-04-075598-4	October 3, 2025	978-1-71-838817-8
12	March 5, 2025	978-4-04-075821-3	January 23, 2026	978-1-71-838819-2
13	September 5, 2025	978-4-04-076066-7	June 22, 2026	978-1-71-838821-5
14	April 3, 2026	978-4-04-076357-6	—	—

=== Manga ===
A manga adaptation illustrated by Relucy began serialization on Kadokawa Shoten's Shōnen Ace Plus manga website on October 25, 2019. The series went on hiatus on January 14, 2022. The manga's chapters have been collected into three tankōbon volumes as of April 2026. The manga adaptation is also licensed in English by J-Novel Club.

No.	Original release date	Original ISBN	North American release date	North American ISBN
1	June 26, 2020	978-4-04-109224-8	July 3, 2024	978-1-71-834505-8
2	April 26, 2021	978-4-04-111098-0	October 23, 2024	978-1-71-834507-2
3	April 24, 2026	978-4-04-112387-4	—	—

== See also ==
- Management of a Novice Alchemist, another light novel series with the same writer
