= As the Demon King's Right Hand, I'm Going to Rewrite the Script! =

Japanese manga series

- Cover of the first novel, published by Kadokawa

魔王の右腕になったので原作改悪します (Maō no Migiude ni Natta node Gensaku Kaiaku Shimasu)
- Genre: Isekai
- Novel series
- Written by: Kimula
- Published by: Pixiv
- Original run: August 5, 2018 – November 21, 2020
- Manga
- Written by: Kimula
- Illustrated by: Jiroalba
- Published by: Shogakukan
- English publisher: SG: Shogakukan Asia
- Imprint: Ura Sunday Comics
- Magazine: MangaONE; Ura Sunday
- Original run: July 9, 2019 – September 1, 2020
- Volumes: 3
- Novel series
- Written by: Kimula
- Illustrated by: Jiroalba
- Published by: Kadokawa
- Imprint: B's LOG Bunko
- Original run: June 15, 2020 – October 15, 2020
- Volumes: 2

As the Demon King's Right Hand, I'm Going to Rewrite the Script! (Note: Japanese: 魔王の右腕になったので原作改悪します, Hepburn: Maō no Migiude ni Natta node Gensaku Kaiaku Shimasu) is a Japanese web novel written by Kimula and released on Pixiv from August 2018 to November 2020. Kadokawa published the novel in print, with art by Jiroalba, with two volumes released. A manga adaptation, illustrated by Jiro, was serialized on Shogakukan's MangaONE app and Ura Sunday online platform from July 2019 to September 2020.

== Media ==
=== Novel ===
The original As the Demon King's Right Hand, I'm Going to Rewrite the Script! web novel, written by Kimula, was posted on Pixiv, with 18 chapters released from August 5, 2018, to November 21, 2020. Kadokawa published it in two print volumes, with art by Jiroalba, released from June 15 to October 15, 2020.

=== Manga ===
A manga adaptation, with art by Jiroalba, was serialized on Shogakukan's MangaONE app and Ura Sunday online platform from July 9, 2019, to September 1, 2020. Shogakukan collected its chapters in three tankōbon volumes, released from November 19, 2019, to November 19, 2020.

The manga is licensed for English release in Southeast Asia by Shogakukan Asia.

==== Volumes ====
| No. | Japanese release date | Japanese ISBN |
|---|---|---|
| 1 | November 19, 2019 | 978-4-09-129482-1 |
| 2 | May 19, 2020 | 978-4-09-850118-2 |
| 3 | November 19, 2020 | 978-4-09-850338-4 |
