= The Only Thing I'd Do in a No-Boys-Allowed Gaming World =

Japanese light novel series

- First light novel volume cover

男子禁制ゲーム世界で俺がやるべき唯一のこと 百合の間に挟まる男として転生してしまいました (Danshi Kinsei Gēmu Sekai de Ore ga Yarubeki Yuiitsu no Koto: Yuri no Aida ni Hasamaru Otoko toshite Tensei shiteshimaimashita)
- Genre: Fantasy; Isekai; Romantic comedy
- Novel series
- Written by: Ryo Hazakura
- Published by: Shōsetsuka ni Narō
- Original run: October 4, 2021 – present
- Light novel
- Written by: Ryo Hazakura
- Illustrated by: hai
- Published by: Media Factory
- English publisher: NA: Yen Press
- Imprint: MF Bunko J
- Original run: April 25, 2023 – present
- Volumes: 10
- Manga
- Written by: Ryo Hazakura
- Illustrated by: Cameyo Kusono
- Published by: ASCII Media Works
- Imprint: Dengeki Comics NEXT
- Magazine: Dengeki Daioh
- Original run: December 26, 2024 – present
- Volumes: 3
- icon

The Only Thing I'd Do in a No-Boys-Allowed Gaming World (Note: Japanese: 男子禁制ゲーム世界で俺がやるべき唯一のこと 百合の間に挟まる男として転生してしまいました, Hepburn: Danshi Kinsei Gēmu Sekai de Ore ga Yarubeki Yuiitsu no Koto: Yuri no Aida ni Hasamaru Otoko toshite Tensei shiteshimaimashita) is a Japanese light novel series written by Ryo Hazakura and illustrated by hai. It began serialization on the user-generated novel publishing website Shōsetsuka ni Narō in October 2021. It was later acquired by Media Factory who began publishing it under their MF Bunko J imprint in April 2023. A manga adaptation illustrated by Cameyo Kusono began serialization in ASCII Media Works' shōnen manga magazine Dengeki Daioh in December 2024.

== Plot ==
Yuri game enthusiast Itsuki Tachibana dies upon being struck by a truck after pushing two girls out of harm's way. He awakens to find himself reincarnated as Hiiro Sanjo, the only male character in his favorite yuri game Everything for the Score (ESCO). In an attempt to save his own skin, Itsuki—as Hiiro—makes it his life's mission to approach the heroines and ensure that his yuri ships remain unsinkable but what he failed to consider was how his strange new behavioral patterns would affect the would-be yuri heroines!

== Media ==
=== Light novel ===
Written by Ryo Hazakura, The Only Thing I'd Do in a No-Boys-Allowed Gaming World began serialization on the user-generated novel publishing website Shōsetsuka ni Narō on October 4, 2021. It was later acquired by Media Factory who began releasing it with illustrations by hai under their MF Bunko J light novel imprint on April 25, 2023. Ten volumes have been released as of June 2026.

During their panel at Anime NYC 2024, Yen Press announced that they had licensed the series for English publication.

No.	Original release date	Original ISBN	North American release date	North American ISBN
1	April 25, 2023	978-4-04-682400-4	February 18, 2025	979-8-8554-0027-4
2	June 23, 2023	978-4-04-682571-1	June 10, 2025	979-8-8554-0753-2
3	October 25, 2023	978-4-04-682991-7	February 10, 2026	979-8-8554-0755-6
4	February 24, 2024	978-4-04-683469-0	June 9, 2026	979-8-8554-2434-8
5	June 25, 2024	978-4-04-683703-5	—	—
6	October 25, 2024	978-4-04-684218-3	—	—
7	February 25, 2025	978-4-04-684559-7	—	—
8	June 25, 2025	978-4-04-684887-1	—	—
9	December 25, 2025	978-4-04-685507-7	—	—
10	June 25, 2026	978-4-04-660217-6	—	—

=== Manga ===
A manga adaptation illustrated by Cameyo Kusono began serialization in ASCII Media Works' shōnen manga magazine Dengeki Daioh on December 26, 2024. The manga's chapters have been compiled into three tankōbon volumes as of July 2026.

No.	Release date	ISBN
1	May 27, 2025	978-4-04-916423-7
2	January 9, 2026	978-4-04-916795-5
3	July 27, 2026	978-4-04-952359-1

== Reception ==
The series was ranked seventh in the bunkobon category in the 2023 Next Light Novel Awards.
