= Please Look After the Dragon =

Japanese manga series

- First tankōbon volume cover

ドラゴン養ってください (Doragon Yashinatte Kudasai)
- Genre: Comedy; Reverse isekai; Slice of life
- Manga
- Written by: Shoun Makise
- Illustrated by: Yuki Higashiura
- Published by: Shogakukan
- English publisher: NA: Yen Press
- Imprint: Ura Shōnen Sunday Comics
- Magazine: MangaONE; Ura Sunday
- Original run: October 11, 2023 – present
- Volumes: 6

Please Look After the Dragon (Japanese: ドラゴン養ってください, Hepburn: Doragon Yashinatte Kudasai) is a Japanese manga series written by Shoun Makise and illustrated by Yuki Higashiura. It began serialization Shogakukan's MangaONE app and Ura Sunday website in October 2023.

== Plot ==
The story centers on college student Murakami who has an unexpected encounter with the dragon Ilsera, who was sent to earth by her parents to hone her magic so as to become a full-fledged dragon after she had failed to pass a test back in her home-world. Finding himself under her needs, Murakami adopts Ilsera so she could train to harness her magical powers.

== Media ==
=== Manga ===
Written by Shoun Makise and illustrated by Yuki Higashiura, Please Look After the Dragon began serialization on Shogakukan's MangaONE app and Ura Sunday website on October 11, 2023. Its chapters have been compiled into six tankōbon volumes as of August 2026.

The series' chapters are published in English by Comikey. During their panel at Anime Expo 2025, Yen Press announced that they had licensed the series for English publication.

No.	Original release date	Original ISBN	English release date	English ISBN
1	March 19, 2024	978-4-09-853169-1	February 10, 2026	979-8-8554-2184-2
1. "Please Look After the Dragon"; 2. "Please Find Me a Place to Train"; 3. "Please Give Me Some Respite"; 4. "Please Dial Back the Hype"; 5. "Please Leave Helping Up to Me"; 6. "Please Let Me Follow You"; 7. "Please Let Me Take Care of This"; Extra Story: "Good Night, Dragon"; Bonus Comic
2	July 18, 2024	978-4-09-853445-6	June 23, 2026	979-8-8554-2378-5
8. "Please Calm Down, Dragon God"; 9. "Please Enjoy the Festival"; 10. "Please Let Me Train"; 11. "Please Stick to the Form You Like Best"; 12. "Please Let Me Express My Gratitude"; 13. "Please Let Me Sell My Wares"; 14. "Please Let Me Assist with Your Retreat"; 15. "Please Let Me Try"; Extra Story: "Watching Fireworks Midnight"
3	December 12, 2024	978-4-09-853701-3	April 27, 2027	979-8-8554-2380-8
4	June 12, 2025	978-4-09-854136-2	—	—
5	December 19, 2025	978-4-09-854307-6	—	—
6	August 10, 2026	978-4-09-854728-9	—	—

=== Other ===
In commemoration of the release of the first volume, a promotional video was uploaded to the MangaONE YouTube channel on March 19, 2024.

== Reception ==
By August 2026, the series had over 250,000 copies in circulation.

The series' first volume featured recommendations from manga artists Hikaru Nakamura, Sōichirō Yamamoto, and Coolkyousinnjya.

The series was nominated for the tenth Next Manga Awards in the web category in 2024.
