= Reincarnated Into a Game as the Hero's Friend =

Japanese light novel series

- Reincarnated Into a Game as the Hero's Friend: Running the Kingdom Behind the Scenes
- First light novel volume cover

魔王と勇者の戦いの裏で ～ゲーム世界に転生したけど友人の勇者が魔王討伐に旅立ったあとの国内お留守番 (Maō to Yūsha no Tatakai no Ura de: Gēmu Sekai ni Tensei Shitakedo Yūjin no Yūsha ga Maō Tōbatsu ni Tabidatta Ato no Kokunai Orushuban)
- Genre: Isekai
- Novel series
- Written by: Yuki Suzuki
- Published by: Shōsetsuka ni Narō
- Original run: March 2, 2021 – present
- Light novel
- Written by: Yuki Suzuki
- Illustrated by: Sanshouuo
- Published by: Overlap
- English publisher: NA: Seven Seas Entertainment
- Imprint: Overlap Bunko
- Original run: March 25, 2022 – present
- Volumes: 7 (Note: Eight volumes in total, including the second part of the seventh volume.)
- Manga
- Written by: Yuki Suzuki
- Illustrated by: Rampei Ashio
- Published by: Overlap
- English publisher: NA: Seven Seas Entertainment
- Imprint: Gardo Comics
- Magazine: Comic Gardo
- Original run: July 15, 2022 – present
- Volumes: 4

Reincarnated Into a Game as the Hero's Friend: Running the Kingdom Behind the Scenes (魔王と勇者の戦いの裏で ～ゲーム世界に転生したけど友人の勇者が魔王討伐に旅立ったあとの国内お留守番, Maō to Yūsha no Tatakai no Ura de: Gēmu Sekai ni Tensei Shitakedo Yūjin no Yūsha ga Maō Tōbatsu ni Tabidatta Ato no Kokunai Orushuban) is a Japanese light novel series written by Yuki Suzuki and illustrated by Sanshouuo. It began serialization on the user-generated novel publishing website Shōsetsuka ni Narō in March 2021. It was later acquired by Overlap who began publishing it under their Overlap Bunko light novel imprint in March 2022. A manga adaptation illustrated by Rampei Ashio began serialization on Overlap's Comic Gardo manga website in July 2022.

== Synopsis ==
The protagonist gets reincarnated into a fantasy game he remembers playing in his previous life. He gets reincarnated into Werner, the son of a powerful noble who is also a background character who is likely to die without being named in the battle between the hero and the demon king. Using his knowledge of the game, and becoming friends with the hero, Werner tries to use these in order to avoid the fate that could come to him.

== Media ==
=== Light novel ===
Written by Yuki Suzuki, Reincarnated Into a Game as the Hero's Friend: Running the Kingdom Behind the Scenes began serialization on the user-generated novel publishing website Shōsetsuka ni Narō on March 2, 2021. It was later acquired by Overlap who began publishing it with illustrations by Sanshouuo under their Overlap Bunko light novel imprint on March 25, 2022. Seven volumes have been released as of December 2025. The series is licensed in English by Seven Seas Entertainment.

No.	Original release date	Original ISBN	North American release date	North American ISBN
1	March 25, 2022	978-4-8240-0127-6	February 29, 2024 (digital); March 19, 2024 (print)	979-8-88843-494-9
1. Prologue; 2. Chapter 1: "First Battle ~Demon Stampede Battle~"; 3. Chapter 2: "Post-Battle Cleanup ~Making Arrangements and Preparations~"; 4. Epilogue; Bonus: "The Royal Academy ~The Hero and the Aristocrats~"
2	September 25, 2022	978-4-8240-0291-4	June 13, 2024 (digital); July 10, 2024 (print)	979-8-88843-661-5
1. Prologue; 2. Chapter 1: "Fall of the Neighboring Kingdom"; 3. Chapter 2: "Escorting Refugees"; 4. Chapter 3: "Affairs in the Area"; 5. Epilogue
3	May 25, 2023	978-4-8240-0465-9	November 21, 2024 (digital); December 24, 2024 (print)	979-8-89160-270-0
1. Prologue; 2. Chapter 1: "Arlea Village"; 3. Chapter 2: "Journey to the Temple"; 4. Chapter 3: "The Battle to Defend Finoy"; 5. Epilogue
4	November 25, 2023	978-4-8240-0658-5	March 27, 2025 (digital); April 22, 2025 (print)	979-8-89160-935-8
1. Prologue; 2. Chapter 1: "Drama at the Capital ~Elimination and Negotiation~"; 3. Chapter 2: "Those Who Scheme ~Conspiracy and Response~"; 4. Chapter 3: "A New Predicament ~Mysteries and Questions~"; 5. Epilogue
5	July 25, 2024	978-4-8240-0884-8	August 7, 2025 (digital); September 16, 2025 (print)	979-8-89373-723-3
1. Prologue; 2. Chapter 1: "A New Job"; 3. Chapter 2: "Subjugating Bandits"; 4. Chapter 3: "The Fight for Anheim"; 5. Epilogue
6	December 25, 2024	978-4-8240-0658-5	January 1, 2026 (digital); February 10, 2026 (print)	979-8-89561-652-9
1. Chapter 1: "A Day in the Capital"; 2. Chapter 2: "Trial by Duel"; 3. Chapter 3: "The Underground Library"
7.1	July 25, 2025	978-4-8240-1252-4	July 2, 2026 (digital); July 28, 2026 (print)	979-8-89765-400-0
1. Chapter 1: "A Scene from the Capital"; 2. Chapter 2: "Their Respective Battlegrounds"; 3. Chapter 3: "Past Mysteries, Present Dangers"
7.2	December 25, 2025	978-4-8240-1448-1	December 22, 2026 (print)	979-8-89863-230-4

=== Manga ===
A manga adaptation illustrated by Rampei Ashio began serialization on Overlap's Comic Gardo website on July 15, 2022. The manga's chapters have been collected into four tankōbon volumes as of July 2024. The manga adaptation is also licensed in English by Seven Seas Entertainment.

No.	Original release date	Original ISBN	North American release date	North American ISBN
1	November 25, 2022	978-4-8240-0340-9	February 20, 2024	979-8-88843-492-5
1. "An Ordinary Person & A Hero"; 2. "Demon Stampede Battle I"; 3. "Demon Stampede Battle II"; 4. "Demon Stampede Battle III"; Bonus: "Genius & Manners"
2	May 25, 2023	978-4-8240-0508-3	June 25, 2024	979-8-88843-792-6
5. "Demon Stampede Battle IV"; 6. "Demon Stampede Battle V"; 7. "Demon Stampede Battle VI"; 8. "Attention & Arrangements I"; 9. "Attention & Arrangements II"; Bonus: "A Minor Commotion on Campus"
3	November 25, 2023	978-4-8240-0670-7	December 10, 2024	979-8-89160-515-2
10. "Attention & Arrangements III"; 11. "Attention & Arrangements IV"; 12. "Attention & Arrangements V"; 13. "Attention & Arrangements VI"; 14. "Attention & Arrangements VII"; Bonus: "The Princess's Conversation with Her Ladies-in-Waiting"
4	July 25, 2024	978-4-8240-0896-1	May 27, 2025	979-8-89373-290-0
15. "Attention & Arrangements VIII"; 16. "Attention & Arrangements IX"; 17. "Attention & Arrangements X"; 18. "Attention & Arrangements XI"; 19. "Attention & Arrangements XII"; Bonus: "A Day in the Life of Count Fürst's Family"

== Reception ==
The series was ranked second in the bunkobon category at the 2023 Next Light Novel Awards. The manga adaptation was ranked seventeenth in the 2024 Da Vinci Book of the Year Ranking.
