= Ugly Duckling of the Entertainment District =

Japanese manga series

- First tankōbon volume cover

みにくい遊郭の子 (Minikui Yūkaku no Ko)
- Genre: Drama; Isekai; Romance
- Manga
- Written by: Naru Kariya
- Published by: Comic Smart (digital); Hifumi Shobō (print)
- English publisher: NA: Mangamo
- Imprint: Lavare Comics
- Magazine: Ganma!
- Original run: May 28, 2021 – present
- Volumes: 9

Ugly Duckling of the Entertainment District (Japanese: みにくい遊郭の子, Hepburn: Minikui Yūkaku no Ko) is a Japanese manga series written and illustrated by Naru Kariya. It began serialization on Comic Smart's Ganma! manga website in May 2021, with its volume releases handled by Hifumi Shobō.

== Synopsis ==
After collapsing at a shrine, a young girl named Esora is suddenly transported into another world into a place that resembles a red-light district. She is later bought by Yahiro, who plans to turn her into a high-ranking courtesan much to her own disgust.

== Publication ==
Written and illustrated by Naru Kariya, Ugly Duckling of the Entertainment District began serialization on Comic Smart's Ganma! manga website on May 28, 2021. Its chapters have been compiled into nine tankōbon volumes published under Hifumi Shobō's Lavare Comics imprint as of October 2025.

During their panel at Anime Expo 2023, Mangamo announced that they had licensed the series and added it to their platform.

No.	Release date	ISBN
1	October 5, 2022	978-4-891-99867-7
2	October 5, 2022	978-4-891-99868-4
3	May 1, 2023	978-4-891-99962-9
4	May 1, 2023	978-4-891-99963-6
5	October 5, 2023	978-4-824-20040-2
6	April 5, 2024	978-4-824-20152-2
7	October 5, 2024	978-4-824-20303-8
8	April 4, 2025	978-4-824-20408-0
9	October 3, 2025	978-4-824-20509-4

== Reception ==
The series was nominated for the ninth Next Manga Awards in the web category. The series ranked fifth in AnimeJapan's "Most Wanted Anime Adaptation" Poll in 2024. It ranked sixth in the 2025 edition of the poll.

By October 2025, the series had over 800,000 copies in circulation.
