= This Is Screwed Up, but I Was Reincarnated as a Girl in Another World! =

Japanese light novel series

- First light novel volume cover

よくわからないけれど異世界に転生していたようです (Yoku Wakaranai Keredo Isekai ni Tensei Shiteita Yō Desu)
- Genre: Fantasy, isekai
- Novel series
- Written by: Ashi
- Published by: Shōsetsuka ni Narō
- Original run: May 16, 2017 – present
- Light novel
- Written by: Ashi
- Illustrated by: Kaoming
- Published by: Kodansha
- Imprint: Kodansha Ranobe Books
- Original run: February 1, 2019 – present
- Volumes: 6
- Manga
- Written by: Ashi
- Illustrated by: Keyaki Uchiuchi
- Published by: Kodansha
- English publisher: NA: Seven Seas Entertainment
- Magazine: Suiyōbi no Sirius
- Original run: October 4, 2019 – present
- Volumes: 33

This Is Screwed Up, but I Was Reincarnated as a Girl in Another World! (よくわからないけれど異世界に転生していたようです, Yoku Wakaranai Keredo Isekai ni Tensei Shiteita Yō Desu) is a Japanese light novel series written by Ashi with illustrations by Kaoming. It began serialization as a web novel published on the user-generated novel publishing website Shōsetsuka ni Narō in May 2017. It was acquired by Kodansha who began publishing it as a light novel under their Kodansha Ranobe Books imprint in February 2019. A manga adaptation illustrated by Keyaki Uchiuchi began serialization on Kodansha's Nico Nico Seiga-based Suiyōbi no Sirius website in October 2019.

== Media ==
=== Light novel ===
Written by Ashi, This Is Screwed Up, but I Was Reincarnated as a Girl in Another World! began serialization on the user-generated web novel publishing site Shōsetsuka ni Narō on May 16, 2017. The series was later acquired by Kodansha who began releasing the series with illustrations by Kaoming under its Kodansha Ranobe Books light novel imprint in February 2019. Six volumes have been released as of October 2025.

No.	Release date	ISBN
1	February 1, 2019	978-4-06-514761-0
2	July 2, 2019	978-4-06-516831-8
3	April 1, 2020	978-4-06-519359-4
4	March 2, 2021	978-4-06-522802-9
5	February 2, 2024	978-4-06-534739-3
6	October 31, 2025	978-4-06-541688-4

=== Manga ===
A manga adaptation illustrated by Keyaki Uchiuchi began serialization on Kodansha's Nico Nico Seiga-based Suiyōbi no Sirius manga website on October 4, 2019. The first tankōbon volume was released on April 9, 2020. The manga's chapters have been compiled into thirty-three tankōbon volumes as of November 2026. The manga is licensed in English by Seven Seas Entertainment.

No.	Original release date	Original ISBN	English release date	English ISBN
1	April 9, 2020	978-4-06-518950-4	June 7, 2022	978-1-64827-801-3
1. "This Is Screwed Up, but It Looks Like I Was Reincarnated in Another World"; 2. "This Is Screwed Up, but It Looks Like My House Is Completed"; 3. "This Is Screwed Up, but I Want to Eat Meet"; 4. "This Is Screwed Up, but It Looks Like I've Gotten Used to Being On My Own"; 5. "This Is Screwed Up, but It Looks Like This Is Cruel"
2	August 6, 2020	978-4-06-520368-2	July 19, 2022	978-1-63858-355-4
6. "This Is Screwed Up, but It Looks Like I'm a Shut-in"; 7. "This Is Screwed Up, but It Looks Like I'm Being a Gracious Host"; 8. "This Is Screwed Up, but It Looks Like I'm Not in the Mood to Do My Chores"; 9. "This Is Screwed Up, but It Looks Like I'm Going on a Journey Again"; 9.5. "This Is Screwed Up, but It Looks Like I'm Reflecting on the Past"
3	November 9, 2020	978-4-06-521181-6	October 11, 2022	978-1-63858-691-3
10. "This Is Screwed Up, but It Looks Like I've Overdone It"; 11. "This Is Screwed Up, but It Looks Like I Might Be Excited"; 12. "This Is Screwed Up, but It Looks Like I Might Have Triggered Something"; 13. "This Is Screwed Up, but It Looks Like This Is Cookware in Another World"
4	January 8, 2021	978-4-06-521846-4	November 15, 2022	978-1-63858-777-4
14. "This Is Screwed Up, but It Looks Like a Pair of Lesbian Sisters Are Putty in My Hands"; 15. "This Is Screwed Up, but It Looks Like I've Had an Unwanted Reunion"; 16. "This Is Screwed Up, but It Looks Like I Went on a Shopping Spree"; 17. "This Is Screwed Up, but It Looks Like I'm Secretly Unrivaled"
5	March 9, 2021	978-4-06-522564-6	February 28, 2023	978-1-63858-874-0
18. "This Is Screwed Up, but It Looks Like I'm Secretly Unrivaled"; 19. "This Is Screwed Up, but It Looks Like This Was a Perfect Victory"; 20. "This Is Screwed Up, but It Looks Like I Really Want Eggs and Milk"; 21. "This Is Screwed Up, but It Looks Like It's Time to Scrap This & Rebuild"; 22. "This Is Screwed Up, but It Looks Like This Is Wrong"
6	May 7, 2021	978-4-06-523140-1	April 11, 2023	978-1-63858-986-0
7	August 6, 2021	978-4-06-524105-9	June 20, 2023	978-1-68579-602-0
8	October 7, 2021	978-4-06-525166-9	August 29, 2023	978-1-68579-919-9
9	December 9, 2021	978-4-06-526019-7	November 7, 2023	978-1-68579-940-3
10	February 9, 2022	978-4-06-526651-9	January 2, 2024	978-1-68579-956-4
11	April 7, 2022	978-4-06-527388-3	March 12, 2024	979-8-88843-401-7
12	July 7, 2022	978-4-06-526019-7	June 4, 2024	979-8-88843-488-8
13	September 8, 2022	978-4-06-528964-8	September 3, 2024	979-8-88843-860-2
14	November 9, 2022	978-4-06-529598-4	December 10, 2024	979-8-89160-060-7
15	February 9, 2023	978-4-06-530515-7	March 11, 2025	979-8-89160-568-8
16	April 7, 2023	978-4-06-531149-3	June 10, 2025	979-8-89160-981-5
17	June 8, 2023	978-4-06-531798-3	October 7, 2025	979-8-89373-368-6
18	September 8, 2023	978-4-06-532796-8	February 17, 2026	979-8-89373-787-5
19	November 9, 2023	978-4-06-533496-6	June 16, 2026	979-8-89373-788-2
20	February 8, 2024	978-4-06-534481-1	October 13, 2026	979-8-89561-414-3
21	April 9, 2024	978-4-06-535044-7	February 16, 2027	979-8-89765-657-8
22	July 9, 2024	978-4-06-535962-4	June 8, 2027	979-8-89765-658-5
23	September 9, 2024	978-4-06-536655-4	—	—
24	December 9, 2024	978-4-06-537701-7	—	—
25	February 7, 2025	978-4-06-538345-2	—	—
26	May 9, 2025	978-4-06-539344-4	—	—
27	July 9, 2025	978-4-06-539925-5	—	—
28	October 9, 2025	978-4-06-541052-3	—	—
29	December 9, 2025	978-4-06-541775-1	—	—
30	March 9, 2026	978-4-06-542760-6	—	—
31	June 9, 2026	978-4-06-543743-8	—	—
32	August 7, 2026	978-4-06-544454-2	—	—
33	November 9, 2026	978-4-06-545436-7	—	—

== Reception ==
The series has over 3.65 million copies in circulation as of August 2025.
