= Dinners with My Darling: How the Former Monster King Ate Her Way to Happiness =

Japanese light novel series

- First light novel volume cover

愛さないといわれましても ～元魔王の伯爵令嬢は生真面目軍人に餌付けをされて幸せになる～ (Aisanai to Iwaremashite mo: Moto Maō no Hakushoku Reijō wa Kimajime Gunjin ni Ezuke wo Sarete Shiawase ni Naru)
- Genre: Fantasy; Romantic comedy
- Novel series
- Written by: Mugi Mameta
- Published by: Shōsetsuka ni Narō
- Original run: April 3, 2022 – October 5, 2023
- Light novel
- Written by: Mugi Mameta
- Illustrated by: Nagisa Hanazome
- Published by: Futabasha
- English publisher: NA: Cross Infinite World
- Imprint: M Novels f
- Original run: October 7, 2022 – present
- Volumes: 7
- Manga
- Written by: Mugi Mameta
- Illustrated by: Toi Ishino
- Published by: Futabasha
- English publisher: NA: MangaPlaza
- Imprint: Monster Comics f
- Magazine: Gaugau Monster
- Original run: January 11, 2023 – present
- Volumes: 8
- Anime

Dinners with My Darling: How the Former Monster King Ate Her Way to Happiness (Japanese: 愛さないといわれましても ～元魔王の伯爵令嬢は生真面目軍人に餌付けをされて幸せになる～, Hepburn: Aisanai to Iwaremashite mo: Moto Maō no Hakushoku Reijō wa Kimajime Gunjin ni Ezuke o Sarete Shiawase ni Naru) is a Japanese light novel series written by Mugi Mameta and illustrated by Nagisa Hanazome. It was originally serialized on the user-generated novel publishing website Shōsetsuka ni Narō between April 2022 and October 2023. It was later acquired by Futabasha who began publishing it under their M Novels f imprint in October 2022. A manga adaptation illustrated by Toi Ishino began serialization on Futabasha's Gaugau Monster manga website in January 2023. An anime adaptation has been announced.

== Synopsis ==
Abigail starts to panic when she is told by her groom that he will never love her. After years of neglect at the hands of her noble family, due to her being the reincarnation of the former demon lord, Abigail believed that she would finally receive a stable food supply with her marriage to Gerald, but his declaration makes her uneasy.

== Characters ==
Abigail (アビゲイル, Abigeiru)
Voiced by: Hisako Kanemoto (voice comic)
Gerald (ジェラルド, Jerarudo)
Voiced by: Tomoaki Maeno (voice comic)

== Media ==
=== Light novel ===
Written by Mugi Mameta, Dinners with My Darling: How the Former Monster King Ate Her Way to Happiness was initially serialized on Shōsetsuka ni Narō from April 3, 2022, to October 5, 2023. It was later acquired by Futabasha who began publishing the series under their M Novels f light novel imprint on October 7, 2022. Seven volumes have been released as of May 7, 2026.

In December 2024, Cross Infinite World announced that they had licensed the series for digital-only English publication.

No.	Original release date	Original ISBN	North American release date	North American ISBN
1	October 7, 2022	978-4-575-24568-4	January 31, 2025 (digital)	979-8-88560-166-5
1. Chapter One: "The Kind Human Who Gives Me Food"; 2. Chapter Two: "I'll Get Bread If I Work, So I'll Work to Get Bread"; 3. Chapter Three: "I'm Sure There's So Much More to Eat at the Castle Feast"; 4. Chapter Four: "I Perform My Wifely Duties"; 5. Chapter Five: "Castle Shrimp Aren't Just for Decoration; Rather the Shrimp I've Always Known Are Fake"; 6. Chapter Six: "Because I Am My Lord Husband's Wife"; 7. Chapter Seven: "My Lord Husband Smells Nice, So I Can Easily Sniff Out His Whereabouts"; 8. Chapter Eight: "I Have New Wifely Duties"; 9. Chapter Nine: "This! Then Like This! Then Here Freeze!"; 10. Chapter Ten: "I've Grown Bigger but I Can Grow Bigger Still"; 11. Chapter Eleven: "I Never Stop and Am Always Healthy"; Side story: "I'm Certain This Is Who They Call Little Piyo"; Side story: "This Place Is Nice and Warm"
2	April 10, 2023	978-4-575-24618-6	April 30, 2025 (digital)	979-8-88560-169-6
1. Chapter One: "Small Failures Are Fine If Things Work Out in the End"; 2. Chapter Two: "Because Reporting Is an Important Job"; 3. Chapter Three: "Humans Don't Go Into Heat or Clone Themselves"; 4. Chapter Four: "Souvenirs Are Fun Because It's Like Saying "I'm Home""; 5. Chapter Five: "Matching and Secrets Are Fun and Nice, I Know"; 6. Chapter Six: "I Know That Fantasy Stories Aren't Real"; 7. Chapter Seven: "Thump-thump! Beep-beep-beep! Turn and Turn, Spin, Spin, Spin!"; 8. Interlude: "My Concept of Haggis Is Ever Changing"; 9. Chapter Eight: "A Maid Teaches Me to Bestow a Kiss before Any Request"; 10. Chapter Nine: "When Giving a Tour, I Must Point with an Open Hand"; 11. Chapter Ten: "Perhaps My Lord Husband Is Just a Little Timid"; 12. Chapter Eleven: "If Someone Roars at Me, I'll Roar Back"; 13. Chapter Twelve: "Always Together Means Forever"; Side story: "Tabitha Can Do Anything, So She Can Teach Me Anything"
3	October 10, 2023	978-4-575-24680-3	March 31, 2026 (digital)	979-8-88560-228-0
1. Chapter One: "Even Now, the Thunderbird Plush Sits by My Pillow"; 2. Chapter Two: "I Get the Most Magnificent Send-Off"; 3. Chapter Three: "I'm Already Busy with My Job as the Viscountess"; 4. Chapter Four: "My Eyes Are Amazing, So I'm Great at Finding Things"; 5. Chapter Five: "I'm Perfect as a Lucky Charm"; 6. Interlude: "I Must Try Something New"; 7. Chapter Six: "Tabitha Will Read to Me at Bedtime"; 8. Chapter Seven: "I Can Keep My Promises"; 9. Chapter Eight: "I've Come to Understand Beauty"; Side story: "Ethan Will Always Be Ethan, Tabitha Will Always Be Tabitha"; Side story: "A Tale from Long, Long Ago"
4	May 10, 2024	978-4-575-24741-1	November 30, 2026 (digital)	979-8-88560-253-2
5	March 10, 2025	978-4-575-24804-3	—	—
6	November 10, 2025	978-4-575-24853-1	—	—
7	May 7, 2026	978-4-575-24888-3	—	—

=== Manga ===
A manga adaptation illustrated by Toi Ishino began serialization on Futabasha's Gaugau Monster website on January 11, 2023. The manga's chapters have been collected into eight tankōbon volumes as of November 2026.

The manga adaptation is published in English on NTT Solmare's MangaPlaza website.

No.	Release date	ISBN
1	May 10, 2023	978-4-575-41637-4
2	November 10, 2023	978-4-575-41759-3
3	May 10, 2024	978-4-575-41876-7
4	November 9, 2024	978-4-575-42010-4
5	May 9, 2025	978-4-575-42142-2
6	November 10, 2025	978-4-575-42278-8
7	May 7, 2026	978-4-575-42410-2
8	November 10, 2026	978-4-575-42541-3

=== Anime ===
An anime adaptation was announced on May 1, 2026.

=== Other ===
In commemoration of the release of the manga's third volume, a voice comic adaptation was uploaded to Futabasha's YouTube channel on May 10, 2024. It featured voice performances from Hisako Kanemoto and Tomoaki Maeno.

== Reception ==
By November 2025, the series had over 1.3 million copies in circulation.

The series was ranked third in the tankōbon category at the 2023 Next Light Novel Awards.
