= Even Dogs Go to Other Worlds =

Japanese light novel series

- Even Dogs Go to Other Worlds: Life in Another World with My Beloved Hound
- First light novel volume cover

異世界転移したら愛犬が最強になりました~シルバーフェンリルと俺が異世界暮らしを始めたら~ (Isekai Teni Shitara Aiken ga Saikyō ni narimashita: Shiruba Fenriru to Ore ga Isekai Kurashi o Hajime tara)
- Genre: Fantasy; Isekai; Slice of life
- Novel series
- Written by: Ryūō
- Published by: Kakuyomu
- Original run: August 30, 2019 – present
- Light novel
- Written by: Ryūō
- Illustrated by: Ririnra
- Published by: Micro Magazine
- English publisher: NA: Cross Infinite World
- Imprint: GC Novels
- Original run: November 30, 2020 – August 29, 2025
- Volumes: 7
- Manga
- Written by: Ryūō
- Illustrated by: Hana Ichika
- Published by: Micro Magazine
- English publisher: NA: Seven Seas Entertainment
- Imprint: Ride Comics
- Magazine: Comic Ride
- Original run: May 31, 2021 – present
- Volumes: 7
- icon

Even Dogs Go to Other Worlds: Life in Another World with My Beloved Hound (異世界転移したら愛犬が最強になりました~シルバーフェンリルと俺が異世界暮らしを始めたら~, Isekai Teni Shitara Aiken ga Saikyō ni Narimashita: Shiruba Fenriru to Ore ga Isekai Kurashi o Hajimetara) is a Japanese light novel series written by Ryūō and illustrated by Ririnra. It began serialization on Kadokawa Corporation's Kakuyomu website in August 2019. It was later acquired by Micro Magazine who published the series under their GC Novels imprint from November 2020 to August 2025. A manga adaptation illustrated by Hana Ichika began serialization in Micro Magazine's Comic Ride online magazine in May 2021.

== Synopsis ==
Takumi is a salaryman who is overworked, however he finds solace in his small pet maltese dog Leo. One day, Takumi is transported to another world and wakes up to see a giant wolf around him. He later realizes that the giant wolf is his pet dog Leo who has transformed into a fenrir.

== Media ==
=== Light novel ===
Written by Ryūō, Even Dogs Go to Other Worlds: Life in Another World with My Beloved Hound began serialization on Kadokawa Corporation's Kakuyomu website on August 30, 2019. It was later acquired by Micro Magazine who published seven volumes with illustrations by Ririnra under their GC Novels light novel imprint from November 30, 2020, to August 29, 2025. The series is licensed in English by Cross Infinite World.

No.	Original release date	Original ISBN	North American release date	North American ISBN
1	November 30, 2020	978-4-86716-085-5	April 24, 2022	979-8-88560-009-5
1. Prologue; 2. Chapter 1: "Starting Life Anew with an All-Powerful Pooch and a Gift"; 3. Chapter 2: "Testing Herb Cultivation & Reconsidering the Forest"; 4. Chapter 3: "Forest Exploration and a New Friend"; 5. Epilogue
2	July 30, 2021	978-4-86716-158-6	April 13, 2023	979-8-88560-059-0
1. Prologue; 2. Chapter 1: "The Side Effects of Herb Cultivation"; 3. Chapter 2: "Claire's Father Pays a Visit"; 4. Chapter 3: "On Currency and Swordplay"; 5. Chapter 4: "Selling Herbs in Ractos"; 6. Epilogue
3	April 30, 2022	978-4-86716-284-2	May 8, 2023	979-8-88560-062-0
1. Prologue; 2. Chapter 1: "Befriending an Orphan Girl"; 3. Interlude Claire: "Discussing Prices with Sebastian"; 4. Chapter 2: "Offering to Help Visitors to the Mansion"; 5. Chapter 3: "Heading for Lange"; 6. Chapter 4: "A Mysterious Doll and a Serious Problem"; 7. Epilogue; Extra: "Sebastian's Lecture on Monsters"
4	April 28, 2023	978-4-86716-421-1	July 30, 2024	979-8-88560-145-0
1. Prologue; 2. Interlude: "Johanna's Speculation"; 3. Chapter 1: "The Purchase of Greital Wine and Its Uses"; 4. Chapter 2: "Further Uses of Herb Cultivation"; 5. Chapter 3: "New Ways to Drink Greital Wine"; 6. Chapter 4: "A Visit to the Yugard Store"; 7. Epilogue; Extra: "Sebastian's Lecture on Magic Items"
5	January 30, 2024	978-4-86716-526-3	March 6, 2025	979-8-88560-172-6
1. Prologue; 2. Chapter 1: "Thoughts on the Anrinnelesse Issue"; 3. Interlude: "Claire's Struggle and Her Maid"; 4. Chapter 2: "On the Development of Herbal Wine"; 5. Chapter 3: "First Attempts at Compounding"; 6. Chapter 4: "The New Herbal Greital Wine"; 7. Chapter 5: "Sightseeing in Ractos"
6	April 30, 2025	978-4-86716-693-2	January 31, 2026	979-8-88560-217-4
1. Prologue; 2. Chapter 1: "Adopting a Beastkin Girl"; 3. Chapter 2: "Acquiring a Surprising New Title"; 4. Chapter 3: "Learning Magic from Claire"; 5. Chapter 4: "How the Herbs Changed"; 6. Chapter 5: "Lieza and the Beastkin Creed"; 7. Epilogue; Side story: "The Adventures of Anze the Shut-In"
7	August 29, 2025	978-4-86716-826-4	July 31, 2026	979-8-88560-239-6
1. Prologue; 2. Chapter 1: "Anrinnelesse and Lieza Finally Become Friends"; 3. Chapter 2: "Lieza's First Shopping Trip"; 4. Chapter 3: "The Stone-Thrower's Story"; 5. Chapter 4: "Takumi and Leo, Vanquishers of Evil"; 6. Epilogue: "Our First Step Forward as Family"

=== Manga ===
A manga adaptation illustrated by Hana Ichika began serialization in Micro Magazine's Comic Ride online magazine on May 31, 2021. The manga's chapters have been compiled into seven tankōbon volumes as of July 2026. The manga adaptation is licensed in English by Seven Seas Entertainment.

No.	Original release date	Original ISBN	North American release date	North American ISBN
1	January 31, 2022	978-4-86716-239-2	May 23, 2023	978-1-68579-702-7
1. "My Beloved Dog Has Gotten a Size Makeover"; 2. "Claire's House Is a Mansion?"; 3. "A Discussion with the Maids"; 4. "In This World, Magic Exists"; 5. "In This World, You Shave with Knives"; 6. "The Boisterous Town of Ractos"; Short story: "The Day I Met My Reliable Partner"
2	July 28, 2022	978-4-86716-319-1	September 26, 2023	979-8-88843-016-3
7. "Everybody Loves Leo in the Town"; 8. "Learning about Herb Cultivation"; 9. "Claire's Background"; 10. "Testing Herb Cultivation"; 11. "Forest Exploration Is a Go"; 12. "Orcs in the Forest"; 13. "First Night Watch"
3	April 27, 2023	978-4-86716-419-8	January 23, 2024	979-8-88843-119-1
14. "Asking Claire How She Feels"; 15. "Searching the Woods Is Harder than Expected"; 16. "We Found a Fenrir"; 17. "Meeting Someone New While Searching the Woods"; 18. "Back Home at the Mansion"; 19. "Speculating About Herb Cultivation"; 20. "Sherry Becomes Claire's Familiar"
4	January 31, 2024	978-4-86716-522-5	October 22, 2024	979-8-88843-808-4
21. "Asking Claire How She Feels"; 22. "Agreeing to the Medicinal Herb Contract"; 23. "It Seems Selling Herbs Requires Self-Defense"; 24. "I've Started Swordmanship Training"; 25. "We Have Mock Rights"; 26. "Disciplining Leo and Sherry"; Side story: "Right as I Was Saying in the 9th Woof"; Side story: "We Stayed Up at Night in the 20th Woof"
5	October 31, 2024	978-4-86716-650-5	July 8, 2025	979-8-89373-327-3
27. "Leo Joins in on Training"; 28. "Herb Sales Have Started"; 29. "My Sword Training Proved Useful"; 30. "We Visited the Orphanage"; 31. "First I Was a Boss and Now I'm a Teacher"; 32. "Still Lots to Think About"; 33. "Going to Get Milishia"
6	August 28, 2025	978-4-86716-820-2	May 26, 2026	979-8-89765-332-4
34. "It Seems Like Nothing Can Be Straightforward"; 35. "A Visitor Came from Rungi"; 36. "I've Started Magic Lessons"; 37. "An Unexpected Surprise"; 38. "We Arrive in Rungi"; 39. "I Found Something Suspicious"
7	July 31, 2026	978-4-82500-008-7	March 30, 2027	979-8-89863-922-8

== See also ==
- By the Grace of the Gods, another light novel series with the same illustrator
- Multi-Mind Mayhem, another light novel series with the same illustrator
