= Multi-Mind Mayhem =

Japanese light novel series

- Multi-Mind Mayhem: Isekai Tensei Soudouki
- First light novel volume cover

異世界転生騒動記 (Isekai Tensei Sōdōki)
- Genre: Isekai
- Novel series
- Written by: Ryousen Takami
- Published by: Shōsetsuka ni Narō (2013–August 2016); AlphaPolis (August 30, 2016–present)
- Original run: 2013 – present
- Light novel
- Written by: Ryousen Takami
- Illustrated by: Ririnra
- Published by: AlphaPolis
- Original run: March 4, 2014 – March 5, 2019
- Volumes: 14
- Manga
- Written by: Ryousen Takami
- Illustrated by: Honoji
- Published by: AlphaPolis
- English publisher: NA: One Peace Books; Alpha Manga (digital)
- Original run: May 4, 2015 – present
- Volumes: 14
- Anime television series
- Directed by: Hiroaki Sakurai
- Written by: Keiichirō Ōchi
- Music by: Ryoshi Takagi
- Studio: Studio Deen
- Original network: Tokyo MX, BS Fuji, AT-X
- Original run: January 6, 2027 – scheduled

Multi-Mind Mayhem: Isekai Tensei Soudouki (Japanese: 異世界転生騒動記, Hepburn: Isekai Tensei Sōdōki) is a Japanese light novel series written by Ryousen Takami and illustrated by Ririnra. It was originally serialized on the online publication platform Shōsetsuka ni Narō in 2013; after winning an award from the publishing company AlphaPolis, it moved serialization to that company's website. Fourteen volumes were published between March 2014 and March 2019. A manga adaptation illustrated by Honoji began serialization on AlphaPolis' website in May 2015, and has been compiled into 14 volumes as of March 2026. An anime television series adaptation produced by Studio Deen is set to premiere in January 2027.

== Premise ==
Bard Cornelius, a young man from a noble family in the Kingdom of Mauricia, is blessed with great skills. This is because he actually has three souls in him: his own, the warlord Oka Sanai Sadatoshi, and Masaharu Oka, his identity in a previous life. Aimed with the skills and knowledge of those inside him, he excels in aspects such as business and military tactics.

== Characters ==
Bard Cornelius (バルド・コルネリアス, Barudo Koruneriasu)
Voiced by: Yūsuke Kobayashi
The son of a noble from the Kingdom of Mauricia, he is the reincarnation of two past figures. After a certain incident, he then enrolls in a knight school. He is also skilled in medicine, being able to heal the princess Rachel of cholera.
Oka Sanai Sadatoshi (岡 左内 定俊)
Voiced by: Takashi Matsuyama
A warlord from the Sengoku period and one of Bard's previous incarnations. Unlike many of his contemporaries, he died peacefully rather than in battle, becoming a source of regret. Because of this, he makes Bard often charge into battle or get involved in dangerous situations on the battlefield.
Masaharu Oka (岡 雅晴, Oka Masaharu)
Voiced by: Satoshi Inomata
A high school student and one of Bard's previous incarnations. He was killed in a traffic accident on the day of his university entrance exam, leading to his reincarnation as Bard. He has a fondness for animal ears.
Seillune (セイルーン, Seirūn)
Voiced by: Yukari Anzai
A maid in the Cornelius household. She is the protagonist's childhood friend, two years older than him, and his personal caretaker. She has feelings for Baldo, whom she has cared for since childhood, and together with Serena, she receives a marriage proposal from Baldo.
Selina (セリーナ, Serīna)
Voiced by: Ayasa Itō
The head of the Savaran Trading Company. A beastkin woman with dog ears, she has fluffy, floppy ears and a tail. After being rescued by Baldo from an assailant, she took on the responsibility of handling the goods and projects he brought to her. She developed feelings for Baldo and, while competing with Seyrune, was also proposed to by Baldo.
Silke (シルク, Shiruku)
Voiced by: Sumire Morohoshi
A marquis's daughter and a first-year student at the knight academy. She is of Tristvi royal blood and is expected to become the figurehead for the restoration of the royal family in the future, but she herself is attracted to Bald.
Maggot (ウジ, Uji)
Voiced by: Marina Inoue
The wife of the Count of Cornelius in the Kingdom of Mauricia. The mother of the protagonist, Baldo. She was once a feared mercenary known as the "Silver Maggot." She is a doting mother but has a tsundere personality and engages in physical affection that can be life-threatening.
Ignus (イグヌス, Igunusu)
Voiced by: Takehito Koyasu
The lord of the Cornelius County in the Kingdom of Mauricia. The father of the protagonist, Baldo. A skilled soldier, but as a nobleman, he is known for his lack of domestic skills, being called a "war poor" man. He was a playboy and was nicknamed the "Red Stallion," but he fell in love at first sight with Maggot, a mere mercenary, and actually went so far as to marry her.
Brooks (ブルックス, Burukkusu)
Voiced by: Toshiki Kumagai
A first-year student at the knight academy. He hit it off with Bald, who had entered early, and they became friends. When Bald was granted the title of Viscount Antrum, he became a retainer along with Nelson. For Bald, who mostly associates with older people, he is a valuable friend of the same generation.
Teresa (テレサ)
Voiced by: Ari Ozawa
A viscount's daughter. She is a childhood friend of Baldo. In reality, she has gender identity disorder and identifies as male. A beautiful woman who dresses as a man by default, she was courting Seyrun and Serina, but she falls in love with and marries Franco, the prince of San Juan.
William (ウィリアム, Uiriamu)
Voiced by: Kohei Yanagi
The third prince. He is the youngest of seven brothers (the fourth son), but because one of his older brothers died young, he was third in line to the throne. When his eldest brother, the Crown Prince, had a child, he and his second eldest brother were relieved of their duties as housemates. He is subservient to his sisters, but he is an even more caring younger brother.
Franko (フランコ, Furanko)
Voiced by: Yuki Sakakihara
The second prince. In reality, he has also gender identity disorder with Teresa and identifies as female. He falls in love with Teresa the moment he meets her. To marry her, he sends his biological mother (the second queen), who would only cause trouble, back to her family home before being appointed Crown Prince. He and Teresa become a historically famous couple, blessed with four sons and four daughters. However, unlike the playboy Teresa, he is very possessive, and each time Teresa suggests he take a concubine (including her own preferences), he refuses. About 300 years later, a historian who uncovered the reality of their married life called them the "reversed couple."

== Media ==
=== Light novel ===
Ryousen Takami originally posted the series to the online publication platform Shōsetsuka ni Narō in 2013. It was nominated for AlphaPolis's 6th Fantasy Novel Prize, where it ultimately won the Grand Prize. The web novel was deleted from the site in August 2016, with serialization moving to the AlphaPolis website.

Following the series' win at AlphaPolis's 6th Fantasy Novel Prize, they began publishing it as a light novel with illustrations by Ririnra. Fourteen volumes were published between March 4, 2014, and March 5, 2019.

No.	Release date	ISBN
1	March 4, 2014	978-4-434-18967-8
2	July 2, 2014	978-4-434-19434-4
3	November 7, 2014	978-4-434-19893-9
4	March 23, 2015	978-4-434-20340-4
5	July 4, 2015	978-4-434-20755-6
6	November 2, 2015	978-4-434-21241-3
7	March 1, 2016	978-4-434-21667-1
8	August 2, 2016	978-4-434-22287-0
9	January 3, 2017	978-4-434-22803-2
10	June 1, 2017	978-4-434-23331-9
11	November 3, 2017	978-4-434-23923-6
12	April 1, 2018	978-4-434-24461-2
13	September 2, 2018	978-4-434-25053-8
14	March 5, 2019	978-4-434-25748-3

=== Manga ===
A manga adaptation illustrated by Honoji began serialization on AlphaPolis' website on May 4, 2015. It has been compiled into 14 tankōbon volumes as of March 2026. The series is released in English on AlphaPolis's Alpha Manga website, and the volumes are published in English by One Peace Books.

No.	Original release date	Original ISBN	North American release date	North American ISBN
1	February 29, 2016	978-4-434-21566-7	September 14, 2021	978-1-64273-140-8
2	November 30, 2016	978-4-434-22527-7	January 11, 2022	978-1-64273-139-2
3	August 31, 2017	978-4-434-23565-8	April 12, 2022	978-1-64273-216-0
4	May 31, 2018	978-4-434-24608-1	July 26, 2022	978-1-64273-170-5
5	February 28, 2019	978-4-434-25565-6	October 25, 2022	978-1-64273-211-5
6	October 31, 2019	978-4-434-26543-3	January 17, 2023	978-1-64273-212-2
7	July 31, 2020	978-4-434-27630-9	April 11, 2023	978-1-64273-252-8
8	April 30, 2021	978-4-434-28793-0	September 5, 2023	978-1-64273-292-4
9	December 31, 2021	978-4-434-29739-7	March 19, 2024	978-1-64273-341-9
10	September 30, 2022	978-4-434-30885-7	—	—
11	July 31, 2023	978-4-434-32321-8	—	—
12	February 29, 2024	978-4-434-33489-4	—	—
13	October 31, 2024	978-4-434-34673-6	—	—
14	March 31, 2026	978-4-434-37497-5	—	—

=== Anime ===
An anime television series adaptation was announced on March 13, 2026. The series will be produced by Studio Deen and directed by Hiroaki Sakurai, with Keiichirō Ōchi handling series composition, Zenjirou Ukulele designing the characters based on Hajime Watanabe's original animation designs, and Ryoshi Takagi composing the music. It is set to premiere on January 6, 2027, on Tokyo MX and other networks. The opening theme song is "Isekai" (異世界; lit. 'Another World'), performed by Maverick Mom, and the ending theme song is "Brand New Day", performed by Sora Tokino.

== Reception ==
The 12th manga volume, released in February 2024, stated that the series had sold over 1.5 million copies.

Rebecca Silverman of Anime News Network reviewed the first manga volume, stating that the series' premise was better than its execution. Despite being interested in the concept, she found the pacing to be too fast, not giving enough time for the plot or characters to be fleshed out. She also questioned the lack of consequences for various plot points, which she suggests was a result of the book's pacing. She wondered if this was the fault of the adaptation or was an issue with the original novels.

== See also ==
- By the Grace of the Gods, another light novel series with the same illustrator
- Even Dogs Go to Other Worlds, another light novel series with the same illustrator
