= Reincarnated as a Dragon Hatchling =

Japanese light novel series

- First light novel volume cover, featuring Illusia (left) and Myria (right)

転生したらドラゴンの卵だった 〜最強以外目指さねぇ〜 (Tensei Shitara Doragon no Tamago Datta: Saikyō Igai Mezasa Nee)
- Genre: Fantasy, isekai
- Novel series
- Written by: Nekoko
- Published by: Shōsetsuka ni Narō
- Original run: August 20, 2015 – present
- Light novel
- Written by: Nekoko
- Illustrated by: Naji Yanagida
- Published by: Earth Star Entertainment (1–12); Square Enix (13–17)
- English publisher: NA: Seven Seas Entertainment
- Imprint: Earth Star Novel (1–12); SQEX Novel (13–17)
- Original run: December 15, 2015 – January 7, 2026
- Volumes: 17
- Manga
- Written by: Nekoko
- Illustrated by: Rio
- Published by: Earth Star Entertainment
- English publisher: NA: Seven Seas Entertainment
- Imprint: Earth Star Comics
- Magazine: Comic Earth Star
- Original run: September 28, 2017 – present
- Volumes: 9
- Anime television series
- Directed by: Yuta Takamura; Nobuyoshi Arai (assistant)
- Written by: Tatsuhiko Urahata
- Music by: Kow Otani
- Studio: Felix Film; Ga-Crew
- Licensed by: Sentai Filmworks; SA/SEA: Muse Communication
- Original network: AT-X, Tokyo MX, SUN, BS11, HTB, UX, HAB
- Original run: January 10, 2026 – March 28, 2026
- Episodes: 12
- icon

Reincarnated as a Dragon Hatchling (Japanese: 転生したらドラゴンの卵だった 〜最強以外目指さねぇ〜, Hepburn: Tensei Shitara Doragon no Tamago Datta: Saikyō Igai Mezasa Nee) is a Japanese light novel series written by Nekoko and illustrated by Naji Yanagida. It originally began as a web novel series on the Shōsetsuka ni Narō website in August 2015, before beginning publication by Earth Star Entertainment under their Earth Star Novel imprint in December 2015, and later moved to Square Enix's SQEX Novel imprint in January 2021. A manga adaptation illustrated by Rio began serialization on Earth Star Entertainment's Comic Earth Star manga website in September 2017, and has been compiled into nine volumes as of January 2026. An anime television series adaptation produced by Felix Film and Ga-Crew premiered from January to March 2026.

== Premise ==
A person from Earth is reincarnated as a dragon, and has to survive in a hostile world of monsters while leveling up with the assistance of the Divine Voice, a mysterious voice that acts as the dragon's guide to the world around him.

== Characters ==
=== Main characters ===
Illusia (イルシア, Irushia)
Voiced by: Shun'ichi Toki (Japanese); Adam Gibbs (English)
The protagonist of the series. Originally a human from Earth, he is reincarnated as a dragon egg, but becomes increasingly more powerful as he evolves into multiple stronger dragon species during the series. He is named Illusia by Myria in volume 2/episode 8 after her favorite flower.
Myria Milleania (ミリア, Miria)
Voiced by: Miku Itō (Japanese); Alyssa Marek (English)
A young mage who saves Illusia from her friends in volume 1/episode 1 when he was still a baby dragon. She gives Illusia his name in volume 2/episode 8, but they are separated during his fight with the Forte Slime. She reunites with Illusia in volume 8 due to both being caught up in the Forte Slime's plans.

=== Illusia's companions ===
Black lizard (黒蜥蜴, Kuro tokage)
Voiced by: Tomori Kusunoki (Japanese); Elissa Cuellar (English)
An unnamed black lizard with powerful venom whom Illusia befriends in volume 1/episode 4. They are separated during Illusia's fight with the Forte Slime in volume 2, but are later reunited in volume 9. She is in love with Illusia and forms a rivalry with Allo when they meet.
Ballrabbit
An unusual type of rabbit living in the Harunae Desert that Illusia befriends in volume 3. It accompanies Nina to the country of Ardesia at the end of volume 4.
Nina
A catgirl slave Illusia rescues in volume 3 while being taken to Harunae City. She travels to Ardesia in volume 4.
Adoff
The disgraced knight-commander of Harunae, who was framed for the murders of his brother and fiancée. At the end of volume 4, he leaves Harunae to reunite with Ballrabbit and Nina in Ardesia.
Partner
The second dragon head Illusia acquires after evolving into an Ouroboros dragon in volume 4. Illusia and Partner face some difficulties communicating at first, but bond over the course of the next few volumes. She sacrifices herself to help defeat Ruin in volume 9.
Allo
An undead 10 year old girl formerly of the Lithovar tribe, who is reanimated by Illusia's magic in volume 5. She is in love with Illusia and forms a rivalry with the black lizard.
Orangurangs
Orangutan-like monsters. After Illusia kills their leader, they become his servants.

=== Myria's village ===
Marielle (マリエル, Marieru)
Voiced by: Rie Kugimiya (Japanese); Melissa Molano (English)
An elven White Mage who lives in Myria's village and trains Myria in magic.
Gregory Grimm
Voiced by: (Japanese); Jeremy Gee (English)
A man from the same village as Myria, who is hostile towards Illusia upon meeting him. They later bond during the Little Rock Dragon's attack on the village, but Illusia is forced to kill him after he is severely injured and he asks Illusia to do so.
Bertz
Voiced by: (Japanese); Jay Hickman (English)
An elderly man from Myria's village.
Jean
Voiced by: (Japanese); Shannon Emerick (English)
A young boy who idolizes Doz.
Lucas
Voiced by: (Japanese); Joshua Swasey (English)
A friend of Gregory's. He is killed by the Rock Dragon.
Aurus
Voiced by: (Japanese); Stephen Alcala (English)
Another one of Gregory's friends.

=== Other characters ===
Doz Doglemaad
Voiced by: (Japanese); Michael Wronski (English)
An adventurer who accompanies Myria at the start of the story. He is seemingly killed by a Little Rock Dragon. He is later revealed to be alive in volume 2/episode 8, with the Forte Slime having enslaved him and stolen his skills. He dies while luring the Little Rock Dragon to the village using its stolen egg.
Grantz Grantzle
Voiced by: (Japanese); Andrew Love (English)
An adventurer who accompanies Myria at the start of the story. He is killed by a Little Rock Dragon.
Meltia
Voiced by: (Japanese); Annie Wild (English)
A swordswoman adventurer who comes to the forest where Illusia lives.
Yuno
Voiced by: (Japanese); Ginger Sue (English)
A beastwoman adventurer who accompanies Meltia.
Daz and Romeena
Two other adventurers who are allies of Meltia and Yuno.

=== Antagonists ===
Divine Voice (神の声, Kami no Koe)
Voiced by: Ami Koshimizu (Japanese); Patricia Duran (English)
A voice that guides Illusia throughout the series by providing information on his skills, evolutions and the world he is reincarnated in. The Divine Voice is eventually revealed to be the main antagonist of the series, having orchestrated the events which led to Illusia becoming stronger and acquiring his powerful skills, with Illusia unknowingly acting as one of its pawns alongside the other antagonists that Illusia faces. It is unknown what its real intentions are.
Forte Slime
An evil slime monster that Illusia confronts in volumes 1 and 2/season 1 that has developed sentience and the ability to use the powers of the monsters it kills. It lures the Little Rock Dragon to Myria's village in volume 2/episode 8 with the goal of absorbing the dead villagers into itself. Illusia seemingly defeats and kills it at the end of volume 2, but it returns in volume 8, having been driven insane due to the Divine Voice abandoning it when Illusia defeated it. It evolves into an ultra-powerful, non-sapient monster known as Ruin in volume 9, but dies for real after its health and mana are fully depleted.
Illusia (human) (イルシア, Irushia)
The main antagonist of volumes 3 and 4. Serving as the Hero of Harunae, he is secretly a cruel and psychotic murderer who has been protected by Harunae's church, which has spoiled and indulged in his every whim since his youth. He is revealed to have killed Adoff's brother and fiancée, and takes Nina captive in an attempt to kill Illusia the dragon. He is killed by Adoff after being defeated by Illusia the dragon and the Divine Voice abandons him.

== Media ==
=== Light novel ===
Written by Nekoko, Reincarnated as a Dragon Hatchling originally began serialization as a web novel on the Shōsetsuka ni Narō website on August 20, 2015. It later began publication as a light novel with illustrations by Naji Yanagida under Earth Star Entertainment's Earth Star Novel imprint on December 15, 2015. Twelve volumes were published up until May 15, 2020. On November 8, 2020, Square Enix announced that they acquired the series and would release it under their newly created SQEX Novel imprint from the thirteenth volume on January 7, 2021, to the seventeenth volume on January 7, 2026.

The light novels are licensed in English by Seven Seas Entertainment.

No.	Original release date	Original ISBN	North American release date	North American ISBN
1	December 15, 2015	978-4-8030-0847-0	June 17, 2021 (digital); July 27, 2021 (print)	978-1-64827-581-4
2	March 15, 2016	978-4-8030-0897-5	October 28, 2021 (digital); November 23, 2021 (print)	978-1-64827-609-5
3	August 15, 2016	978-4-8030-0950-7	April 14, 2022 (digital); May 3, 2022 (print)	978-1-64827-627-9
4	February 15, 2017	978-4-8030-0998-9	June 16, 2022 (digital); July 26, 2022 (print)	978-1-63858-119-2
5	October 17, 2017	978-4-8030-1123-4	October 5, 2023 (digital); October 31, 2023 (print)	978-1-63858-220-5
6	February 15, 2018	978-4-8030-1161-6	February 15, 2024 (digital); May 28, 2024 (print)	978-1-63858-338-7
7	June 15, 2018	978-4-8030-1201-9	July 4, 2024 (digital); August 13, 2024 (print)	978-1-63858-766-8
8	September 13, 2018	978-4-8030-1230-9	October 3, 2024 (digital); November 12, 2024 (print)	978-1-63858-910-5
9	February 15, 2019	978-4-8030-1271-2	January 9, 2025 (digital); February 4, 2025 (print)	979-8-88843-133-7
10	July 16, 2019	978-4-8030-1313-9	May 13, 2025	979-8-89160-955-6
11	December 14, 2019	978-4-8030-1363-4	July 3, 2025 (digital); August 12, 2025 (print)	979-8-89373-466-9
12	May 15, 2020	978-4-8030-1420-4	October 16, 2025 (digital); November 11, 2025 (print)	979-8-89373-467-6
13	January 7, 2021	978-4-7575-7026-9	March 24, 2026 (print)	979-8-89765-452-9
14	June 7, 2021	978-4-7575-7310-9	August 4, 2026 (print)	979-8-89765-453-6
15	November 6, 2021	978-4-7575-7563-9	—	—
16	June 7, 2022	978-4-7575-7956-9	—	—
17	January 7, 2026	978-4-301-00266-6	—	—

=== Manga ===
A manga adaptation illustrated by Rio began serialization on Earth Star Entertainment's Comic Earth Star manga website on September 28, 2017. The manga's chapters have been collected into nine tankōbon volumes as of January 2026.

The manga adaptation is also licensed in English by Seven Seas Entertainment.

No.	Original release date	Original ISBN	North American release date	North American ISBN
1	June 15, 2018	978-4-8030-1198-2	September 28, 2021	978-1-64827-601-9
2	August 10, 2019	978-4-8030-1319-1	February 15, 2022	978-1-64827-620-0
3	July 10, 2020	978-4-8030-1428-0	May 3, 2022	978-1-63858-113-0
4	April 12, 2021	978-4-8030-1508-9	September 26, 2023	978-1-63858-358-5
5	March 12, 2022	978-4-8030-1623-9	February 27, 2024	978-1-63858-839-9
6	March 10, 2023	978-4-8030-1757-1	September 3, 2024	979-8-88843-805-3
7	March 13, 2024	978-4-8030-1918-6	February 25, 2025	979-8-89373-167-5
8	January 10, 2025	978-4-8030-2061-8	September 30, 2025	979-8-89561-708-3
9	January 9, 2026	978-4-8030-2250-6	September 29, 2026	979-8-89765-358-4

=== Anime ===
An anime television series adaptation was announced on March 14, 2025. It is produced by Felix Film and Ga-Crew and directed by Yuta Takamura, with Nobuyoshi Arai serving as assistant director, Tatsuhiko Urahata handling series composition, Masahito Onoda designing the characters and Kow Otani composing the music. The series premiered from January 10 to March 28, 2026, on AT-X and other networks. The opening theme song is "Gliding Claw", performed by Sizuk, and the ending theme song is "Sky Clipper", performed by Tao and Sak. Sentai Filmworks licensed the series in North America for streaming on Hidive. Muse Communication licensed the series in South and Southeast Asia.

==== Episodes ====
No.	Title	Directed by	Written by	Storyboarded by	Original release date
1	"Reincarnated as an Egg"; Transliteration: "Tensei Shitara Tamagodatta" (Japanese: 転生したら卵だった)	Yuta Takamura	Tatsuhiko Urahata	Hiromitsu Soma	January 10, 2026
A man from Earth is reincarnated as a baby dragon still inside its egg, though he can see outside through a small hole. He finds himself in a forest. A mysterious voice called the Divine Voice serves as his guide, teaching him about stats. He obtains new skills while tumbling down a cliff still inside his egg. He learns that he will be targeted by humans while in his egg form and is only able to move around by rolling. After encountering and killing a Dark Worm, he begins to hatch after being given a choice to evolve. This causes the Divine Voice to evolve with a different voice. The Divine Voice also urges him to level up to the top as he hatches into a Baby Dragon. He then eats the Dark Worm's corpse. The next day, he continues to hunt and kill Dark Worms to level up and does the same to Graywolves. The Baby Dragon hears three humans, consisting of two men and a girl, coming and decides to approach them. The men are hostile towards him, but the girl stops her comrades from killing him and heals him afterwards. The girl is revealed to be Myria Milleania. The Baby Dragon then gains the ability to understand her language as the two men are heard screaming. Despite the Dragon's warning, Myria goes to help them. The Baby Dragon quickly follows and encounters a Rock Dragon who has injured Myria. The Rock Dragon then turns its attention to him.
2	"Hated for Being Brave"; Transliteration: "Yūki o Dashitara Kirawareta" (Japanese: 勇気を出したら嫌われた)	Nobuyoshi Arai	Tatsuhiko Urahata	Erika Nakajima	January 17, 2026
The Baby Dragon is attacked by the Rock Dragon, and the Divine Voice tells him to run away and live, knowing that he won't stand a chance against it, but he refuses to abandon Myria. He also notices that Myria's companions were killed, but Doz is missing. Despite his best efforts, he is unable to damage the Rock Dragon. At the last moment, he manages to dodge an attack and get Myria to safety. He then starts making his way to a nearby village, but is attacked by Greywolves along the way. Myria briefly sees the dragon protecting her before passing out. By nightfall, they arrive, but the villagers believe that the Baby Dragon attacked Myria and attack him. Unable to communicate with the villagers, he leaves Myria behind and gets to safety, relieved that Myria will be okay. Two days later, Myria wakes up and learns that Marielle, an elven mage, treated her wounds. She also learns that Doz and Grantz, the men she traveled with, had died. She remembers how she met Doz and Grantz as well as the Baby Dragon and wonders if he helped her, but Marielle still believes that the Baby Dragon attacked her and was driven away by a villager named Gregory. As for the Baby Dragon, having recovered as well, he trains and reaches max level and is granted five evolutions to pick from. The Divine Voice explains what each one is before he picks, but he has trouble figuring out which to choose.
3	"An Unexpected Pleasant Evolution"; Transliteration: "Shinka Shitara Kaitekidatta" (Japanese: 進化したら快適だった)	Norio Kashima	Shinya Murakami	Erika Nakajima	January 24, 2026
After some pondering, the Baby Dragon decides to evolve into a Young Plague Dragon in hopes of gaining human form, but his new form has more powerful but dangerous skills that he does not want. Meanwhile, Myria and Marielle examine the warding stones that generate the barrier protecting the village from monsters, though it is ineffective against strong monsters. With the Dragon still on Myria's mind, Marielle tells her more about monsters and the Divine Voice, warning her against forming bonds with monsters. The Dragon decides to continue leveling up and be a hero, hoping to gain a human form one day so he can see Myria again. He encounters a spider monster who proves to be a strong foe, forcing him to run away as he cannot fly yet. After unsuccessfully attempting to lose the spider by jumping over a ravine, he is left no choice but to fight it. He eventually tricks it into letting its guard down, allowing him to finish it off. The Dragon later takes refuge in a cave, still eager to gain the power to transform into a human. Back at the village, Myria learns from a man named Bertz that Doz is still alive and is wandering around the forest, but Gregory is skeptical. Marielle forbids her from leaving the village for her own safety, and will instead ask the guild to investigate it. The next day, the Dragon comes across a slime monster, but is unable to view its stats.
4	"The Pot Turned Out to be a Tortoise"; Transliteration: "Tsubo ka to Omottara Kamedatta" (Japanese: ツボかと思ったらカメだった)	Mitsuyo Yokono	Tatsuhiko Urahata	Mai Yamazaki	January 31, 2026
The Dragon escapes from the slime and comes across what appears to be a clay pot, but it turns out to be a monster called a Potortoise. It proves to be very tough to hurt, until the Dragon throws it into a river, but he discovers that the Potortoise has summoned more of its kind for help. After defeating them all, he confronts another monster called a Claybear, which is much stronger. He eventually manages to kill it. Back in his cave, he creates a makeshift stove using the monster corpses. While searching for food, he defeats a carnivorous flower and finds rare mushrooms and berries. He returns to his cave to prepare and eat his meal. The next day, the Dragon continues to make improvements to the cave and hunt other monsters for food. Meanwhile, Myria disobeys Marielle's orders to not leave the village and sets off to find Doz on her own, still blaming herself for what happened to him and Grantz. In another area, two female adventurers arrive at the forest. In a flower field, the Dragon meets a lizard monster called a Venom Princess Lacerta, who bites and poisons him.
5	"The Toxic Woman Turned Out to Be Wife Material"; Transliteration: "Doku On'na ka to Omottara Yome datta" (Japanese: 毒女かと思ったらヨメだった)	Nobuyoshi Arai	Shinya Murakami	Nobuyoshi Arai	February 7, 2026
With the poison worsening, the Dragon learns that the lizard has the antidote that can cure it. He runs with the lizard in pursuit, eventually knocking it into a river, but has to save it so he can get the antidote; however, he has reached his limit. He then wakes up to find that he is fully healed; the lizard had given him the antidote. The two then begin to bond and the Dragon takes the lizard to his cave where they share a meal. The lizard reveals that by eating poison, it strengthens its venom. Despite being nameless, they decide to not give each other names, though the Dragon calls the lizard the Black Lizard. They work together to hunt monsters and find food. At one point, the lizard gets injured following a fight against two powerful wolf monsters, but it survives. Meanwhile, Myria returns to the village following her failed attempt to find Doz and lies to Marielle about what she was really doing. She also learns about the stronger monsters in the forest, including the Rock Dragon. The two female adventurers from earlier arrive at the village where they meet Myria and Marielle.
6	"I Became Human and Got Caught"; Transliteration: "Ningen ni Nattara Shiba Kareta" (Japanese: 人間になったらシバかれた)	Madoka Yaguchi	Tatsuhiko Urahata	Erika Nakajima	February 14, 2026
After discovering that he has gained a Human Transformation ability, the Dragon takes the lizard back to his cave to recover and goes to a faraway area to take his human form, but to his dismay, it doesn't turn him completely human. Meanwhile, Marielle hires the two adventurers, Meltia and Yuno, to search for Doz, having known what Myria was up to. After a long search, they come across the Dragon's cave where they encounter the lizard and Dragon. The latter tries to interact with them in his "human" form, but gets attacked instead. Realizing how powerful the monsters in the forest are, the adventurers quickly flee to get backup. Later, the Dragon and lizard try to deal with the monkey monsters, the Orangurangs, that have been stealing their food, but they summon their alpha. After the Dragon manages to telepathically communicate with the alpha, it explains that it deems the Dragon a threat to his kind and is willing to make sacrifices to eliminate him. The Dragon challenges it to a one on one duel and the alpha agrees, but takes the lizard hostage to ensure that she can't help the Dragon. After a long duel, the Dragon manages to kill the alpha, and the lizard is released before the Dragon falls unconscious.
7	"I Went on a Date and Got Ditched"; Transliteration: "Dēto ni Ittara Hōchi Sareta" (Japanese: デートに行ったら放置された)	Fumio Maezono	Shinya Murakami	Mai Yamazaki	February 21, 2026
The Dragon wakes up back in his cave; the lizard brought him home with the help of the Orangurangs. He discovers that he has leveled up and the Orangurangs now declare him as their new leader. They help him hunt, collect food, cook, and make pottery, though this makes the lizard jealous. She poisons one of the Orangurangs in retaliation, though the Dragon is not pleased with her actions. He finally sees that he was ignoring her and decides to make up for it by spending a whole day with her, but the Orangurangs ruin their moment. Back at the village, Meltia and Yuno are still waiting for their companions to arrive, and Myria goes on another journey into the forest behind Marielle's back. He notices Doz, but also encounters some wolf monsters. The Dragon hears her and, after wondering if other humans are with her regarding his last encounter with the villagers, rushes to save her. This upsets the lizard even more. Myria doesn't recognize him in his new look, until an intervention by the Divine Voice annoying the Dragon causes her to at last see that he is the same dragon that saved her. The Dragon quickly flees with Myria with the wolves in pursuit.
8	"I Realized I Had No Name"; Transliteration: "Kanagaetara Namae Nakatta" (Japanese: 考えたら名前なかった)	Yuta Takamura	Tatsuhiko Urahata	Erika Nakajima	February 28, 2026
Marielle and Gregory search for Myria, having figured that she has gone into the forest again. Marielle decides to search for her alone, while the adventurers begin their own mission. Meanwhile, the Dragon manages to kill the wolves, but still worries about taking her back to the village since the villagers still despise him. After studying his optional new forms, he and Myria stop near a pond to rest. While trying to communicate with each other, Myria explains her reasons for coming into the forest. Since the Dragon has no name, Myria decides to name him Illusia, after her favorite flower, and begins to grow attached to him. After being warned by the Divine Voice that he can't change his name later, he accepts his new name. Hearing more wolf monsters coming, Illusia continues his way to the village with Myria, but comes across the wolf leader. On its back is Doz, who is in a trance and is carrying an egg. Myria is shocked to see that he is helping the wolves. Doz heads to the village, and Myria realizes that the egg that he has is the Rock Dragon's and he is luring it to the village. The two follow him, but Myria convinces Illusia to leave her behind so she can stop the wolves while he stops Doz; however, they are both injured by the wolves in the process. They continue on to the village just as the Rock Dragon also arrives, with the same slime monster from before watching it. Marielle and the adventurers are still roaming the forest.
9	"I Went to the Village and Found Carnage"; Transliteration: "Mura ni Ittara Shuraba datta" (Japanese: 村に行ったら修羅場だった)	Nobuyoshi Arai	Shinya Murakami	Hiromitsu Soma	March 7, 2026
Myria heals Illusia's injuries as they continue their way to the village while Gregory kills a wolf monster. He is surprised to see Myria working with Illusia, whom he recognizes as the same dragon from before. Gregory also sees that Illusia isn't dangerous, but the Rock Dragon is still at large. The three resume their way to the village, but Doz has also made it there. Illusia and Gregory, now starting to bond with each other, go to deal with the Rock Dragon and Doz while Myria stays behind due to her injury. Despite their actions, Doz cannot be killed so easily and he takes a boy named Jean hostage, also revealing that he has a slime-like substance inside of him. The Rock Dragon arrives and after Illusia catches Jean once Doz throws him aside, Doz smashes the egg, further enraging the Rock Dragon, who kills him as revenge. Meanwhile, Marielle has returned to the village and Myria fills her in on what's happening. Gregory flees with Jean while Illusia stays to fight the Rock Dragon. It still proves to be too strong for Illusia to beat, but Gregory quickly returns with his friends to help; however, they are quickly overpowered. Illusia levels up, but he also wonders who the Divine Voice really is after it considers abandoning him if he dies. Determined to prove himself, he tries to pick a new form, but none of them appear to be capable of defeating the Rock Dragon without harming the village, leaving him at a disadvantage.
10	"I Evolved Into an Evil Dragon"; Transliteration: "Shinka Shitara Yokoshima Ryū datta" (Japanese: 進化したら邪竜だった)	Nobuyoshi Arai	Tatsuhiko Urahata	Hiromitsu Soma	March 14, 2026
The adventurers hear the commotion coming from the village and rush back there as Myria and Marielle help the villagers evacuate before heading back to town the deal with the Rock Dragon. Meanwhile, Gregory, knowing that he is beyond help now, urges Illusia to kill him. After learning of a new evolution stage, Illusia reluctantly does so. This allows him to evolve into a Plague Dragon, now able to match the Rock Dragon's strength. Myria and Marielle learn about Gregory's death from his friend Aurus, which he blames on Illusia, unaware that Gregory asked him to end his life. Both Illusia and the Rock Dragon are still fighting in the forest. While the villagers recover, Myria goes to find Illusia, as she still doesn't think he's a monster, to Marielle's dismay. After Illusia managed to defeat the Rock Dragon, Myria shows up and Illusia tries to tell the truth as Marielle arrives and attempts to feud off Illusia. Myria tries to defend him, but Illusia decides that he is too dangerous to be around Myria now after accidentally releasing toxic fumes that infect her and quickly leaves, beginning to hate his new life and his name.
11	"I Caught Sight of the Mastermind"; Transliteration: "Mika Ketara Kuromaku datta" (Japanese: 見かけたら黒幕だった)	Matsuyo Yokono & Yuta Takamura	Shinya Murakami	Erika Nakajima	March 21, 2026
The adventurers find the Rock Dragon's corpse while the villagers recover, but Myria still hasn't gotten her mind off Illusia, as she thinks that him killing Gregory was a misunderstanding. She accompanies the adventurers in search for survivors. Marielle doesn't like the idea of talking to Illusia again, but two of the adventurers side with Myria and decide to accompany her. Meanwhile, Illusia reunites with the Black Lizard, who still recognizes and loves him despite being abandoned. Illusia decides to leave the forest, but first goes back to his cave. On the way, he spots the slime monster and remembers it. Noticing that it is heading towards the village, he pursues it while discovering that it has unusual abilities and realizes that it is the mastermind behind the whole thing. He and the lizard attempt to fight it, but they instead find two kids, which are actually the slime in disguise. The slime, having the ability to shapeshift, then takes a humanoid form and also reveals that it can regenerate, making Illusia see that it has been stealing abilities from other monsters; however, they cannot communicate directly. He and the lizard fight the slime, but it proves to be a formidable foe. The slime then traps the lizard in a force field.
12	"I Looked to the Sky and Saw a Hero"; Transliteration: "Sora o Miagetara Yūsha datta" (Japanese: 空を見上げたら勇者だった)	Yuta Takamura	Tatsuhiko Urahata	Erika Nakajima	March 28, 2026
Marielle, Myria, and Meltia search for Illusia. Meltia explains her previous encounter with Illusia. Meanwhile, Illusia manages to free the Black Lizard, but the slime has recovered from the lizard's poison by stealing her poison recovery skill. Illusia learns more about the slime's stats and skill-stealing ability. The slime explains that it too can hear the Divine Voice. Illusia quickly creates a ring of fire to stop the slime from getting to the village, and this draws the attention of Myria's group. The slime summons more wolf monsters for backup, and outwits Illusia, attempting to absorb his skills from the inside. Illusia flies high up in the air and sees Myria's group before diving back down and landing in a river, seemingly killing the slime. He is then washed away, leaving Myria and the lizard devastated. Myria's group return to the village. Knowing that Myria may leave the village again, Marielle asks the adventurers to accompany her. The lizard takes command of the Orangurangs until Illusia returns. Illusia wakes up to find that he has ended up in a desert near the ocean, confused by where he is.

== See also ==
- The Exiled Heavy Knight Knows How to Game the System, another light novel series written by Nekoko
- This Alluring Dark Elf Has the Heart of a Middle-Aged Man!, another light novel series illustrated by Naji Yanagida
