= Hello, I am a Witch, and My Crush Wants Me to Make a Love Potion! =

Japanese light novel series

- First light novel volume cover

どうも、好きな人に惚れ薬を依頼された魔女です。 (Dōmo, Suki na Hito ni Horegusuri o Iraisareta Majo desu)
- Genre: Fantasy, romantic comedy
- Novel series
- Written by: Eiko Mutsuhana
- Published by: Shōsetsuka ni Narō
- Original run: April 10, 2019 – March 14, 2020
- Light novel
- Written by: Eiko Mutsuhana
- Illustrated by: Vient
- Published by: Futabasha
- English publisher: NA: Cross Infinite World
- Imprint: M Novels f
- Original run: October 16, 2019 – March 16, 2020
- Volumes: 2
- Manga

Hi, I'm a Witch, and My Crush Wants Me to Make a Love Potion
- Written by: Eiko Mutsuhana
- Illustrated by: Kamada
- Published by: Kadokawa Shoten
- English publisher: NA: Yen Press
- Imprint: Flos Comic
- Magazine: KadoComi
- Original run: August 28, 2020 – present
- Volumes: 6
- Anime television series
- Directed by: Keizō Kusakawa
- Written by: Wataru Watari
- Music by: Hayato Matsumura
- Studio: Diomedéa
- Licensed by: Crunchyroll
- Original network: AT-X, Tokyo MX, BS NTV, RKB, MBS
- Original run: October 5, 2026 – present
- Episodes: 7
- icon

Hello, I am a Witch, and My Crush Wants Me to Make a Love Potion! (Japanese: どうも、好きな人に惚れ薬を依頼された魔女です。, Hepburn: Dōmo, Suki na Hito ni Horegusuri o Iraisareta Majo desu) is a Japanese web novel series written by Eiko Mutsuhana. It was originally serialized on the online publication platform Shōsetsuka ni Narō from April 2019 to March 2020, before being published as a light novel by Futabasha under its M Novels f imprint in two volumes featuring illustrations by Vient between October 2019 and March 2020. A manga adaptation illustrated by Kamada began serialization on Kadokawa's KadoComi service under its Flos Comic label in August 2020, and has been compiled into six volumes as of February 2026. An anime television series adaptation produced by Diomedéa premiered in October 2026.

== Plot ==
Rose, a witch nicknamed the "Witch of the Lake", is asked by a visitor, Harij Azm to produce a love potion. Rose claims to not have a potion for him, but in reality she had secretly produced a love potion, one she had hidden since falling for him years ago. Despite her crush being completely one-sided, Rose decides to trick Harij into getting ingredients for her to produce a love potion so that they could meet more often, which leads to Harij becoming a regular at the hermitage, which only annoys him further, as he'd much rather do anything else than to spend time with her.

== Characters ==
Rose (ロゼ, Roze)
Voiced by: Mikako Komatsu
A witch who lives alone at a hermitage following the deaths of her mother and grandmother. She first met Harij four years prior to the start of the story, falling for him due to his kindness and handsomeness, though is slightly dismayed when she realizes he doesn't reciprocate in the slightest. When he suddenly comes to the hermitage to get a love potion, she lies and says they are out of stock, but in reality she had secretly created one with him in mind. She decides to make him collect ingredients for her as a way for him to keep returning to the hermitage.
Harij Azm (ハリージュ・アズム, Harīju Azumu)
Voiced by: Yōhei Azakami
A knight whom Rose fell for after an encounter. He visits Rose to get a love potion, and is tricked into collecting ingredients for time. Initially, he does not like Rose at all, and her constantly asking him to get more and more absurd ingredients for the potion often annoys and frustrates him, which leads to him rushing with the tasks so she can leave him alone. However, over time he slowly begins to reciprocate her feelings, despite not wanting to admit it.
Tien (ティエン)
Voiced by: Hiro Shimono
Villaura (ビッラウラ, Birraura)
Voiced by: Akira Sekine

== Media ==
=== Light novel ===
The series is written by Eiko Mutsuhana, who originally posted it as a web novel on the online publication platform Shōsetsuka ni Narō between April 10, 2019, and March 14, 2020. It was later picked up for publication by Futabasha, which began publishing it as a light novel with illustrations by Vient. Futabasha published two volumes under its M Novels f imprint between October 16, 2019, and March 16, 2020. The light novel is licensed in English by Cross Infinite World.

No.	Original release date	Original ISBN	North American release date	North American ISBN
1	October 16, 2019	978-4-575-24217-1	June 30, 2020	978-1-945341-38-0
Prologue: The Witch and the Heartbreaking Love Potion; Chapter 1: The Good Witch of the Lake; Chapter 2: The Dangerous Apple for Witches; Chapter 3: What It Means to be a Witch; Chapter 4: The Witch and the Promised Love Potion; Chapter 5: It's the Witch Who Casts Magic on the Princess; Chapter 6: The Eventful Night and the Witch; Chapter 7: The Witch, the Knight, and the Love Potion; Epilogue: Witch; Side Story: The Witch's Shadow and the Cradle of Happiness
2	March 16, 2020	978-4-575-24258-4	January 29, 2021	978-1-945341-46-5
Prologue: The Witch Sets Out; Chapter 1: A Confounded Witch; Chapter 2: The Witch and the Mysterious Visitor; Chapter 3: The Clear Lake, Silver Grass, Sukiyaki, and the Space between the Witch and Him; Chapter 4: The Witch Who Became a Mannequin; Interlude: The Place Where the Witch's Soul Rests; Chapter 5: The Witch's Hermitage Floating in a Puddle; Chapter 6: The Little Witch of the Past; Chapter 7: The Witch's Love Potion; Chapter 8: The Witch Attends a Palace Ball; Epilogue: The Witch's Wedding

=== Manga ===
A manga adaptation illustrated by Kamada began serialization on Kadokawa's KadoComi service under its Flos Comic label on August 28, 2020. The first tankōbon volume was released on December 28, 2020; six volumes have been released as of February 5, 2026. The manga is licensed in English by Yen Press under the title Hi, I'm a Witch, and My Crush Wants Me to Make a Love Potion.

No.	Original release date	Original ISBN	North American release date	North American ISBN
1	December 28, 2020	978-4-04-680143-2	July 19, 2022	978-1-9753-3864-0
2	October 5, 2021	978-4-04-680678-9	May 23, 2023	978-1-9753-4803-8
3	September 5, 2022	978-4-04-681551-4	October 17, 2023	978-1-9753-7051-0
4	August 4, 2023	978-4-04-682536-0	June 18, 2024	978-1-9753-9458-5
5	December 17, 2024	978-4-04-684288-6	January 20, 2026	979-8-8554-2325-9
6	February 5, 2026	978-4-04-685609-8	—	—

=== Anime ===
An anime television series adaptation was announced on February 2, 2026. The series will be produced by Diomedéa and directed by Keizō Kusakawa, with Wataru Watari handling series composition, Masakazu Ishikawa designing the characters, and Hayato Matsumura composing the music. It premiered on October 5, 2026, on AT-X and other networks. The opening theme song is "Kanawanai" (かなわない、; 'I Can't Compare'), performed by Centimillimental, and the ending theme song is "Mada Uso ni wa Naranai" (まだ嘘にならない; 'It's Still Not a Lie'), performed by Reini. Crunchyroll is streaming the series.

==== Episodes ====
No.	Title	Directed by	Written by	Storyboard by	Original release date
1	"The Witch and the Love Potion of Unrequited Love"; Transliteration: "Majo to Shitsuren no Horegusuri" (Japanese: 魔女と失恋の惚れ薬)	Unknown	Unknown	TBA	October 5, 2026
Living on a lake island on the outskirts of a human kingdom, Lake Witch Rose receives an unexpected visit from Harij, a Royal Knight she has loved for four years without his knowledge. She is disappointed when he requests a love potion, but due to her eagerness to spend time with him, Rose sends Harij on gruelling ingredient-gathering quests, forcing him to visit her island frequently, which irritates him. Harij's fellow knights worry about his overworking and lack of a wife. Meanwhile, merchant Tien visits to buy Rose's popular household potions (cleaning products, shampoo and perfumes), though his increased order sizes irritate her. Tien worries her isolation is making her depressed. Reflecting on her past, Rose recalls her first city visit where humans openly spread rumours about her deceased grandmother, the former Lake Witch. She fell in love with Harij when he defended her grandmother's reputation, scolding the crowd for celebrating a kind witch's death. Later, after a lab accident, Rose cleans up using her own household potions and bathes in the lake. Freshly washed, she resolves to accept reality: Harij will never see her as anything more than a useful witch, as he does not reciprocate her feelings at all.
2	"The Good Witch of the Lake"; Transliteration: "Mizūmi no Yoki Majo" (Japanese: 湖の善き魔女)	Unknown	Unknown	TBA	October 12, 2026
Rose asks Tien for a new robe to replace her damaged black one. Thrilled, Tien returns with dozens of fabric samples, facial powder, and lip gloss. Embarrassed by a fabric matching Harij's uniform, Rose selects a silver and gold embroidered forest green robe instead. When Harij visits, a panicked Rose avoids wearing the new robe or makeup. Observing his exhaustion, she offers an energy potion, which he declines, making her wonder why he would trust a love potion instead. Harij notices how thin Rose is, realizing she eats only lettuce from her garden. She requests he return in a month, during which she improves her hygiene. However, while washing her undergarments completely naked, Harij unexpectedly arrives early. Rushing to cover herself with her new green robe, she accidentally greets him by name. Cornered, Rose admits she always knew his identity and reveals that witches cannot lie. To avoid disclosing more witch secrets, and to keep herself from revealing her love to Harij (since she knows it is completely one-sided), she decides to kill herself. Understanding her plight, Harij quickly stops her and swears never to reveal the witches' weakness. He explains he returned early to bring her bread, helping her gain weight. Grateful despite having to tidy up before eating, Rose loves the bread, while Harij enjoys watching her eat.
3	"The Black Tea Scented Witch's Song"; Transliteration: "Kōcha Kaoru Majo no Uta" (Japanese: 紅茶香る魔女の歌)	Unknown	Unknown	TBA	October 19, 2026
In the past, it is revealed it is Harij's employer, Princess Villaura, who desperately asked for the love potion. In the present, Harij visits Rose daily with food, worrying about her safety living alone. He discovers more of her unhealthy lifestyle: lacking basic necessities and working continuously having never learned what a "weekend" is. When Rose reaches for her only good plate on a high shelf, Harij lifts her up, noting she remains dangerously underweight. Harij asks Rose to remove her hood during his visits, pointing out that since witches cannot lie, he is the one person she can be completely honest with. Touched by his reasoning, she agrees, though she hides her face again when he compliments her beauty. The next day, Harij brings tea and is entranced as Rose sings while brewing it. Rose admits she is a poor cook who invented a hunger-suppressing potion when food became a hassle, only eating the lettuce to avoid wasting it. When Harij asks about the brewing song, Rose realizes her non-singing grandmother couldn't have taught it to her, meaning it was a forgotten memory of her mother she never would have remembered without Harij.
4	"A Knight's Duty Even Unknown to the Witch"; Transliteration: "Majo no Shiranai Kishi no Gimu" (Japanese: 魔女の知らない騎士の義務)	TBA	TBA	TBA	October 26, 2026
Harij is concerned Villaura's tutor, Professor Marshal, is in love with her even though Villaura is marrying in two months. Villaura is distracted by a banquet where she hopes to meet Lady Kosmas from Nefrit, as Villaura is marrying Nefrit's king and hopes to build relationships with Nefrit nobility. Harij does not agree with the marriage as the king is elderly. Harij remains determined to get the love potion for Villaura before her wedding. He visits Rose again but Tien is already there and took the only boat, forcing Harij to wait. Rose finds she is upset when Tien sits in Harij's chair. Harij realises he has started selecting food he knows are Rose's favourites. When he sees Tien act familiarly with Rose by removing her hood, it upsets him that he is not the only person she shows her face to. Tien teases Harij over the recent changes Rose has made for him, while Harij is surprised to finally learn Rose's name. When he calls her Rose, she quickly insists he not, upsetting him. His upset worsens after seeing Tien used his chair and teacup. He feels foolish for imaging a bond between them that never existed, causing an unpleasant feeling in his heart.
5	"To Be a Witch"; Transliteration: "Majo ni Naritai" (Japanese: 魔女になりたい)	TBA	TBA	TBA	November 2, 2026
A flashback reveals Rose’s belief that witches are defined by usefulness rather than good or evil. Feeling upset that Harij will stop visiting once his love potion is finished, Rose nevertheless agrees to fill Tien’s massive order of winter remedies. Tien is surprised when Rose refers to herself as the Good Lake Witch, contradicting her past views. Feeling fatherly pride in her, Tien hints he may soon send furniture and other items for her but will not explain why. Later, children follow the unaware Rose while she shops for ingredients. When the apothecary cannot fill her full order, she agrees to return later, only to be pelted with mud by the children, who brand her an evil witch. Harij catches the troublemakers just as their parents, including the apothecary, arrive. Though the adults panic upon realizing Rose is a real witch, Harij defends her and reveals she makes the everyday potions they rely on. Thoroughly scolded by Harij and their parents, the children apologize, and the apothecary warmly invites Rose back to collect the rest of her order. Grateful, Rose recognizes that Harij saved the Lake Witch's reputation. Though Harij offers his ongoing protection, Rose resolves to become self-reliant. One week later, she completes the love potion.
6	"The Witch and the Promised Love Potion"; Transliteration: "Majo to Yakusoku no Horekusuri" (Japanese: 魔女と約束の惚れ薬)	TBA	TBA	TBA	November 9, 2026
On his next visit, Rose reveals the completed love potion and explains adding bodily fluids to it causes the drinker to feel intense affection for the giver for 12 hours. Depending on circumstances it will permanently fade into either mild fondness or genuine love. Harij jokes he will never again accept a drink from someone else, so Rose offers a one-minute demonstration of a weaker version. Harij asks her to drink it instead. Expecting no effect since she already loves him, Rose drinks it and is shocked by a sudden wave of burning desire. Rose begins to express her feelings, including her sadness over him using the potion on another woman. Surprised, Harij reveals the potion is not for him and nearly kisses her. Rose stops him, claiming it is because the minute has expired. After Harij leaves, an embarrassed Rose packs away the tablecloth, believing he will never return. However, Harij comes back days later requesting a second potion. While thrilled to keep seeing him, Rose asks him to forget the near-kiss. In reality, Harij was angry at himself for trying to kiss her while under the potion's influence and finds himself developing feelings he doesn't understand. Interpreting the absent tablecloth and her request to forget as a rejection, he childishly ordered another potion to prolong their meetings.
7	"The One to Cast a Spell on the Princess Is a Witch"; Transliteration: "Hime ni Mahō o Kakeru no Wa Majo" (Japanese: 姫に魔法をかけるのは魔女)	TBA	TBA	TBA	November 16, 2026
Concerned by her brother Yasm’s depression over her upcoming wedding, Villaura questions whether the witch’s love potion will work. Curious over Harij’s confident assurance that "it definitely works", she sneaks out and visits Rose under the alias "Lau." Assuming Lau is a noble’s daughter, Rose explains that a witch simply fulfils requests without judging how potions are used. Rose deflects Villaura's question about whether she has ever been in love. However, when Villaura admits she wanted an honest conversation free from royal sycophancy, Rose confesses she has mixed, happy feelings about a troublesome regular client. Envious of those genuine emotions, Villaura reveals she is arranged to marry a stranger forty years her senior and ordered the love potion to force herself to love her future husband and have a chance at happiness. Harij suddenly arrives seeking a spell to locate a missing "item," only to realize the item, Princess Villaura, is already there. Stunned by Lau’s true identity, Rose feels jealous of Harij’s attentiveness toward the princess. Lashing out, Rose asks if he still wants the second potion, hinting he plans to use it to make Villaura love him instead. Recognizing her childish jealousy, Harij reminds her that prying violates witch rules and promises to return for tea, leaving Rose flustered as an amused Villaura watches their awkward exchange.

== Reception ==
Writing for Anime News Network, Rebecca Silverman reviewed the first volume of the manga. Comparing the manga to the original novels, she praised the manga for having detailed art and for how the story handled Harij's reactions to Rose's living conditions. However, she criticized how Harij comes off as less sweet and Rose is more reliant on him compared to the novel.

== See also ==
- Return from Death, another light novel series with the same writer
