= If the Heroine Wants My Fiancé, I'll Marry a Yandere Villain Instead! =

Japanese light novel series by Kobako Takara and Jun Natsuba

- Cover of the first light novel volume

ヒロインに婚約者を取られるみたいなので、悪役令息を狙います (Hiroin ni Kon'yakusha o Torareru Mitainanode, Yandere Kyara o Neraimasu)
- Genre: Isekai, romantic comedy
- Novel series
- Written by: Kobako Takara
- Published by: Shōsetsuka ni Narō (self-published)
- Original run: 23 August 2023 – present
- Light novel
- Written by: Kobako Takara
- Illustrated by: Jun Natsuba
- Published by: Enterbrain
- English publisher: NA: Cross Infinite World
- Imprint: B's Log Bunko
- Original run: 15 February 2024 – 15 October 2025
- Volumes: 4
- Manga
- Written by: Kobako Takara
- Illustrated by: Zenra
- Published by: Kadokawa Shoten
- Imprint: Flos Comic
- Magazine: Comic CMoa
- Original run: 2 March 2026 – present

If the Heroine Wants My Fiancé, I'll Marry a Yandere Villain Instead! (Japanese: ヒロインに婚約者を取られるみたいなので、悪役令息を狙います, Hepburn: Hiroin ni Kon'yakusha o Torareru Mitainanode, Yandere Kyara o Neraimasu; "It Looks Like the Heroine is Going to Steal my Fiancé, so I'm Going to Target the Villainous Young Lord (Yandere Character) Instead") is a Japanese light novel series written by Kobako Takara and illustrated by Jun Natsuba. Originally published as a web novel on Shōsetsuka ni Narō since August 2023, it was later released as a light novel by Enterbrain under its B's Log Bunko imprint from February 2024 to October 2025. A manga adaptation illustrated by Zenra began serialization online on NTT Solmare's Comic CMoa website under Kadokawa's Flos Comic brand in March 2026.

== Plot ==
Cynthia Rhuddlan, daughter of a viscount, realizes that she is a reincarnated villainess in a game, with the heroine Elly attracted his fiancé. She plans to split with her fiancé in the hopes of getting together with another villainous character, the evil aristocrat Siraiya Brooke.

== Media ==
=== Light novel ===
Written by Kobako Takara, If the Heroine Wants My Fiancé, I'll Marry a Yandere Villain Instead! was first published as a web novel on Shōsetsuka ni Narō on 23 August 2023. A light novel edition, illustrated by Jun Natsuba, was released in four volumes by Enterbrain under its B's Log Bunko imprint on 15 February 2024 to 15 October 2025. In October 2025, Cross Infinite World announced that it has licensed the light novel series for English publication.

No.	Original release date	Original ISBN	English release date	English ISBN
1	15 February 2024	978-4-04-737838-4	31 December 2025	979-8-88560-201-3
2	12 July 2024	978-4-04-738021-9	28 February 2026	979-8-88560-203-7
3	15 February 2025	978-4-04-738281-7	—	—
4	15 October 2025	978-4-04-738630-3	—	—

=== Manga ===
A manga adaptation illustrated by Zenra began serialization online on NTT Solmare's Comic CMoa website under Kadokawa's Flos Comic brand under the Flos Comic brand on 2 March 2026.

== Reception ==
Writing for Anime News Network, Lauren Orsini and Rebecca Silverman both gave the light novel 3 out of 5; Orsini concluded that "[she] enjoyed reading about the variety of clever schemes Cynthia enacted to get her way while keeping her hands clean, but readers looking for a yandere villain story will need to find another book", while Silverman praised the romance plot and called it "the perfect book to curl up with on a snowy day". Sean Gaffney of A Case Suitable for Treatment praised the resolution of both the first two volumes.

Orsini remarked that Volume 1 has "the kind of smooth writing that can only come from careful editing, plus formatting that makes it easy to read on a variety of screen sizes", while Silverman praised what she called a "good translation". Orsini expressed surprise about the misleading title, but expected "a surprisingly cute and fast-paced revenge story" afterwards, while Gaffney described the running gag of the word yandere being mistakenly considered positive instead of creepy as "amusing".

Gaffney praised Cynthia and Siraiya for their likeability, putting the former in "the 'highly competent' variety of heroines", Silverman called the couple's relationship "aggressively cheesy (in a good way)".
