= The Drab Princess, the Black Cat, and the Satisfying Break-Up =

Japanese light novel series

- First light novel volume cover

地味姫と黒猫の、円満な婚約破棄 (Jimihime to Kuroneko no, Enman na Konyaku Haki)
- Genre: Drama, fantasy, romance
- Novel series
- Written by: Rino Mayumi
- Published by: Shōsetsuka ni Narō
- Original run: January 27, 2020 – present
- Light novel
- Written by: Rino Mayumi
- Illustrated by: Hachi
- Published by: Futabasha
- English publisher: NA: Cross Infinite World
- Imprint: M Novels f
- Original run: September 15, 2020 – present
- Volumes: 10
- Manga

Gloomy Princess and the Black Cat's Peaceful Engagement Annulment
- Written by: Rino Mayumi
- Illustrated by: Asana Haine (vol. 1–5); Netsurō Ohitashi (vol. 6–)
- Published by: Futabasha
- English publisher: NA: MangaPlaza
- Imprint: Monster Comics f
- Magazine: Gaugau Monster
- Original run: December 9, 2020 – present
- Volumes: 11

The Drab Princess, the Black Cat, and the Satisfying Break-Up (地味姫と黒猫の、円満な婚約破棄, Jimihime to Kuroneko no, Enman na Konyaku Haki) is a Japanese light novel series written by Rino Mayumi and illustrated by Hachi. It began serialization as a web novel published on Shōsetsuka ni Narō in January 2020. It was later acquired by Futabasha who began releasing it under their M Novels f imprint in September 2020. A manga adaptation illustrated by Asana Haine began serialization on Futabasha's Gaugau Monster manga service in December 2020.

== Plot ==
Seren has been teased all her life due to her "gloomy" appearance, especially in comparison to her younger sister. She overhears her fiancé talk about how he should have been engaged with her younger sister, hearing this she decides to annul the engagement, and train to become a high level magician with the help of a man named Viol and his black cat familiar.

== Media ==
=== Light novel ===
Written by Rino Mayumi, The Drab Princess, the Black Cat, and the Satisfying Break-Up began serialization on Shōsetsuka ni Narō on January 27, 2020. It was later acquired by Futabasha who began publishing the series under its M Novels f light novel imprint on September 15, 2020. Ten volumes (including eight released digital-only) have been released as of June 10, 2026.

In March 2022, Cross Infinite World announced that they had licensed the series for English digital-only publication.

No.	Original release date	Original ISBN	North American release date	North American ISBN
1	September 15, 2020	978-4-575-24296-6	July 8, 2022	979-8-88560-008-8
2	February 15, 2021	978-4-575-24374-1	December 21, 2022	979-8-88560-020-0
3	July 14, 2021 (ebook)	—	September 29, 2023	979-8-88560-092-7
4	July 8, 2022 (ebook)	—	December 29, 2023	979-8-88560-045-3
5	March 10, 2023 (ebook)	—	February 28, 2025	979-8-88560-159-7
6	October 10, 2023 (ebook)	—	May 31, 2026	979-8-88560-234-1
7	June 10, 2024 (ebook)	—	—	—
8	January 10, 2025 (ebook)	—	—	—
9	September 10, 2025 (ebook)	—	—	—
10	June 10, 2026 (ebook)	—	—	—

=== Manga ===
A manga adaptation illustrated by Asana Haine began serialization on Futabasha's Gaugau Monster website on December 9, 2020. Haine would illustrate the manga until the fifth volume and was replaced by Netsurō Ohitashi. The manga's chapters have been collected into eleven (including three released digital-only) tankōbon volumes as of May 2026.

The manga adaptation is published in English on NTT Solmare's MangaPlaza website under the title Gloomy Princess and the Black Cat's Peaceful Engagement Annulment.

No.	Release date	ISBN
1	April 15, 2021	978-4-575-41233-8
2	October 15, 2021	978-4-575-41305-2
3	April 8, 2022	978-4-575-41393-9
4	November 10, 2022	978-4-575-41525-4
5	June 9, 2023	978-4-575-41663-3
6	November 25, 2023	978-4-575-41772-2
7	May 24, 2024	978-4-575-41890-3
8	November 25, 2024	978-4-575-42025-8
9	May 23, 2025 (ebook)	—
10	November 23, 2025 (ebook)	—
11	May 23, 2026 (ebook)	—
12	November 23, 2026 (ebook)	—

== Reception ==
The series, alongside The Pregnant Contract Bride: I Was Bought by an Infatuated CEO and Fell Pregnant with His Love Child!, won the Light Novel Prize at NTT Solmare's Digital Comic Awards in 2022.
