= Cross Infinite World =

American publishing company

- Status: Active
- Founded: 2016; 10 years ago
- Country of origin: United States
- Headquarters location: California
- Distribution: International
- Publication types: light novels, manga, audiobooks
- Official website: www.crossinfworld.com

Cross Infinite World is a California-based language localization company specializing in Japanese to English translation and publication of Japanese media such as light novels and manga.

== History ==
Founded in 2016, Cross Infinite World is a localization company working directly with Japanese authors, artists, and manga artists. Cross Infinite World released their first light novel series My Favorite Song ~The Silver Siren~ on May 16, 2016, in digital format. Shortly thereafter, they announced the acquisition of The Violet Knight light novel series.

Originally known to be aiming for female-oriented light novels Cross Infinite World announced their plans to cross into publishing manga.

On August 23, 2016, Cross Infinite World announced the licensing of two manga series, Gleam and Little Hero.

On May 2, 2017, Cross Infinite World announced the licensing of the light novels: Akaoni: Contract with a Vampire, I Became the Secretary of a Hero!, and the manga Yusen Ruten: An Era of Red.

On January 8, 2018, Cross Infinite World expanded their retail platform to Google Play Books and iBooks.

On August 22, 2019, Cross Infinite World announced that they would release of printed versions of their digital light Novels. Beginning with eight different light novel series.

On October 12, 2021, Cross Infinite World announced that they would be making audiobook versions of their licenses in partnership with Podium.

On April 30, 2022, Cross Infinite World began to expand their print platform to include Right Stuf Anime.

== Titles ==
=== Light novels ===
- The Abandoned Heiress Gets Rich with Alchemy and Scores an Enemy General!
- Akaoni: Contract with a Vampire
- Another World's Zombie Apocalypse Is Not My Problem!
- Apocalypse Bringer Mynoghra: World Conquest Starts with the Civilization of Ruin
- As The Villainess, I Reject These Happy-Bad Endings!
- Assassin Empress Bellreuge
- Beast † Blood
- Breaking Up Was the Plan, the Duke Falling For the Villainess Was Not!
- The Brooding Duke's Guide to the Lie-Detecting Lady
- By a Twist of Fate, I'm Attending the Royal Academy in Disguise
- The Champions of Justice and the Supreme Ruler of Evil
- The Cursed Princess and the Lucky Knight
- Dawn of the Mapmaker: The Surveyor Girl and the Forbidden Knowledge
- Dinners with My Darling: How the Former Monster King Ate Her Way to Happiness
- The Do-Over Damsel Conquers the Dragon Emperor
- The Drab Princess, the Black Cat, and the Satisfying Break-Up
- The Dragon's Soulmate is a Mushroom Princess!
- The Eccentric Master and the Fake Lover
- emeth: Island of Golems
- Even Dogs Go to Other Worlds: Life in Another World with My Beloved Hound
- Expedition Cooking with the Enoch Royal Knights
- Fluffy Paradise
- The Former Assassin Who Got Reincarnated as a Noble Girl
- From Bumbling Prodigy to Villainess: Will the Duke's Love Go Unnoticed?
- From Corporate Drone to Mincemaster! One Order of Dragon Coming Right Up!
- Goodbye, Horrible Fiancé, Hello, Fun Magic School Life!
- Hello, I am a Witch, and My Crush Wants Me to Make a Love Potion!
- Hey! You've Kidnapped the Wrong Royal!
- The Hired Heroine Wants the Villainess to Gloat
- How I Became King by Eating Monsters
- I Became the Secretary of a Hero!
- I Guess This Dragon Who Lost Her Egg to Disaster Is My Mom Now
- I Reincarnated As Evil Alice, So the Only Thing I'm Courting Is Death!
- I Want to Be a Saint, But I Can Only Use Attack Magic!
- I'll Use This Do-over to Become the Ideal Lady's Maid!
- If the Heroine Wants My Fiancé, I'll Marry a Yandere Villain Instead!
- The Inconvenient Life of an Arousing Priestess
- The Invisible Wallflower Marries an Upstart Aristocrat After Getting Dumped for Her Sister!
- Labyrinth Angel
- Let's Get to Villainessin': Stratagems of a Former Commoner
- Little Princess in Fairy Forest
- Love & Magic Academy: Who Cares about the Heroine and Villainess? I Want to Be the Strongest in this Otome Game World
- Lovestruck Prince! I'll Fight the Heroine for My Villainess Fiancée!
- Making Jam in the Woods: My Relaxing Life Starts in Another World
- Mia and the Forbidden Medicine Report
- The Misfortune Devouring Witch is Actually a Vampire?
- My Favorite Song ~The Silver Siren~
- Obsessions of an Otome Gamer
- Of Dragons and Fae: Is a Fairy Tale Ending Possible for the Princess's Hairstylist?
- Onmyoji and Tengu Eyes: The Spirit Hunters of Tomoe
- Past Life Countess, Present Life Otome Game NPC?!
- The Princess' Smile: The Body-Double Bride Searches for Happiness with the Reclusive Prince
- Rapunzel of the Magic Item Shop
- Reflection of Another World
- Reincarnated as the Last of My Kind
- The Reincarnated Villainess Won't Seek Revenge
- Reset! The Imprisoned Princess Dreams of Another Chance!
- Return from Death: I Kicked the Bucket and Now I'm Back at Square One With a Boyfriend Who Doesn't Remember Me
- Revolutionary Reprise of the Blue Rose Princess
- Rising from Ashes: My Dear Emperor, You're Putty in My Hands!
- Romance of the Imperial Capital Kotogami: A Tale of Living Alongside Spirits
- Root Double -Before Crime * After Days
- The Saint's Belated Happiness: Newly Single, Now Living with the Demon Prince
- Since I Was Abandoned After Reincarnating, I Will Cook With My Fluffy Friends
- So You Want to Live the Slow Life? A Guide to Life in the Beastly Wilds
- Soup Forest: The Story of the Woman Who Speaks with Animals and the Former Mercenary
- Strawberry Princess: The Time Loop Defying Villainess
- The Strongest Knight is Actually a Cross-Dressing Noblewoman?!
- Surviving in Another World as a Villainess Fox Girl!
- Third Loop: The Nameless Princess and the Cruel Emperor
- This Alluring Dark Elf Has the Heart of a Middle-Aged Man!
- Too Strong to Belong! Banished to Another World!
- The Villainess' Journal: Newlywed Life of an Obsessive Researcher
- The Violet Knight
- The Weakest Manga Villainess Wants Her Freedom!
- Welcome to Monstrous Miss Sophie's Enchanted Salon of Healing
- Welcome to Olivia's Magic Jewelers
- The Werewolf Count and the Trickster Tailor
- A Young Lady Finds Her True Calling Living with the Enemy

=== Audiobooks ===
- Apocalypse Bringer Mynoghra: World Conquest Starts with the Civilization of Ruin
- Even Dogs Go to Other Worlds: Life in Another World with my Beloved Hound
- I'd Rather Have a Cat than a Harem!
- Reincarnated as the Last of My Kind
- Reset! The Imprisoned Princess Dreams of Another Chance!

=== Manga ===
- Gleam
- Little Hero
- Tia La Cherla
- Yusen Ruten: An Era of Red
