= Inherit the Winds =

Japanese anime television series

風を継ぐもの (Kaze o Tsugu Mono)
- Genre: Historical
- Created by: Aniplex; Yutaka Narui
- Manga
- Written by: Matsuri Muramatsu
- Published by: Seikaisha
- Magazine: Saizensen
- Original run: 2026 – scheduled
- Anime television series
- Directed by: Tomohiro Kawamura
- Written by: Yutaka Narui
- Music by: Shigeru Kishida
- Studio: Live2D Creative Studio; Drive
- Original network: JNN (CBC, TBS)
- Original run: January 2027 – scheduled

Inherit the Winds (Japanese: 風を継ぐもの, Hepburn: Kaze o Tsugu Mono) is an upcoming Japanese original anime television series produced by Live2D Creative Studio and Drive. It is directed by Tomohiro Kawamura, written by Yutaka Narui, and features character designs by Fumi Ebina and music by Shigeru Kishida. It is loosely based on a series of plays of the same name produced by the theater group Caramel Box, which Narii belongs to, although it features a different story. The series is set to premiere in January 2027 on the Agaru Anime programming block on all JNN affiliates, including CBC and TBS. A theatrical edition of the anime will open in Japanese theaters on November 13, 2026, by Animec. The opening theme song is "Kaze wo Tsugumono" (風を継ぐもの; 'Inherit the Winds'), and the ending theme song is "Namida no Kawa" (涙の河; 'River of Tears'), both performed by Quruli and Hitsujibungaku. A four-panel manga adaptation illustrated by Matsuri Muramatsu will begin serialization on Seikaisha's Twi4 X (formerly Twitter) account and Saizensen website in 2026.

== Plot ==
In 1863, amidst the turmoil of the Bakumatsu era, an amnesiac boy is brought to the barracks of the Mibu Rōshigumi in Kyoto. The boy is assisted by the organization's officer Okita Sōji, who names him Tachikawa Jinsuke. While attempting to regain his memories, Jinsuke begins work as a soldier of the Mibu Rōshigumi, as the organization evolves into the Shinsengumi and becomes witnesses to a world undergoing rapid change.

== Characters ==
Tachikawa Jinsuke (立川 迅助)
Voiced by: Daisuke Sakuma (Snow Man)
Okita Sōji (沖田 総司)
Voiced by: Yuki Kaji
Koganei Hyōgo (小金井 兵庫)
Voiced by: Aoi Yūki
Hijikata Toshizō (土方歳三)
Voiced by: Koki Uchiyama
Kondō Isami (近藤勇)
Voiced by: Yuichi Nakamura
Kurosuke (クロスケ)
Voiced by: Nichika Ōmori
Nagakura Shinpachi (永倉 新八)
Voiced by: Ryōhei Kimura
Tōdō Heisuke (藤堂平助)
Voiced by: Ayumu Murase
Harada Sanosuke (原田 左之助)
Voiced by: Shimba Tsuchiya
Yamanami Keisuke (山南 敬助)
Voiced by: Takeo Ōtsuka
Serizawa Kamo (芹沢 鴨)
Voiced by: Yasuyuki Kase
Umeda Shinbei (梅田新兵衛)
Voiced by: Takaya Kamikawa
Niimi Nishiki (新見錦)
Voiced by: Daisuke Hirakawa
Kawai Kisaburō (河合喜三郎)
Voiced by: Toshiyuki Toyonaga
Momoyama Kyūsai (桃山九斎)
Voiced by: Kappei Yamaguchi
Yoshida Toshimaro (吉田敏麿)
Voiced by: Toshiki Kumagai
