= Toshiki Kumagai =

Japanese voice actor

- 熊谷 俊輝
- Born: 18 September 2007 (age 19)
- Occupation: Actor
- Years active: 2016–present
- Employer: Avex Pictures
- Notable work: The Lion King as the Japanese voice of young Simba; Yu-Gi-Oh! Go Rush!! as Yuhi Ohdo; You Are Ms. Servant as Hitoyoshi Yokoya

Toshiki Kumagai (熊谷 俊輝, Kumagai Toshiki; born 18 September 2007) is a Japanese actor from Kurashiki, affiliated with Avex Pictures. He appeared in several music events and in musicals as a child actor, and his foreign dub roles include young Simba in the 2019 Disney film The Lion King. In anime, he has starred as Yuhi Ohdo in Yu-Gi-Oh! Go Rush!! and Hitoyoshi Yokoya in You Are Ms. Servant.

== Biography ==
Toshiki Kumagai, a native of Kurashiki, was born on 18 September 2007. After his older sister (a student in musical theatre) inspired him to go into singing, he was part of the Kurashiki Music Festival and sang there. He later appeared at the Kiratto Entertainment Challenge Contest 2016, winning second prize in the singing category.

In January 2019, he made his stage debut as Gustave in the Japanese production of the musical Love Never Dies at Nissay Theatre. From November to December 2019, he appeared in the Japanese production of the musical Phantom as a younger Erik. He voiced Simba as a cub in the Japanese dub of the 2019 Disney film The Lion King. In 2020, he appeared as LIttle Guido in the Japanese production of Nine.

Kumagai initially voiced Keiji in Fushigi Dagashiya Zenitendō (2020) and Ichirō in Yasuke (2021). In 2022, he starred as Yuhi Ohdo in Yu-Gi-Oh! Go Rush!!, and in 2024, he starred as Hitoyoshi Yokoya in You Are Ms. Servant and voiced Raion Ōno in Tasūketsu: Fate of the Majority. In addition to The Lion King, he has also continued doing voicework for the Japanese dubs of other foreign television series and films, including the titular protagonist of Remi, Nobody's Boy, Piak in The Letter for the King, and Josh in the Apple TV+ series Best Foot Forward.

His hobby is playing the guitar, and his special skills are singing and piano.

As of 2019, he was educated at Avex Artist Academy Tokyo School.

== Filmography ==
=== Television animation ===
Year	Title	Role	Ref.
2021	Yasuke	Ichirō	
2022	Mini Mame-chan	Aloe Anthony	
2022	Yu-Gi-Oh! Go Rush!!	Yuhi Ohdo	
2023	The Legend of Heroes: Trails of Cold Steel	Child soldier	
2024	Himitsu no AiPri	Ryōta Kyōgoku	
2024	Tasūketsu: Fate of the Majority	Raion Ōno	
2024	You Are Ms. Servant	Hitoyoshi Yokoya	
2025	Apocalypse Bringer Mynoghra	Takuto Ira	
2025	Sword of the Demon Hunter: Kijin Gentōshō	Heikichi Utsugi	
2026	Suikoden: The Anime	Riliu	
2026	Witch Hat Atelier	Custas	
2027	Inherit the Winds	Yoshida Toshimaro	
2027	Multi-Mind Mayhem	Brooks	

=== Animated film ===
Year	Title	Role	Ref.
2020	Fushigi Dagashiya Zenitendō	Keiji	
2022	Break of Dawn	Densuke	

=== Stage ===
Year	Title	Role	Notes	Ref.
2019	Love Never Dies	Gustave	Nissay Theatre, Tokyo	
2019	Phantom	Young Erik	Akasaka ACT Theater, Tokyo, and Umeda Arts Theater, Osaka	
2020	Nine	LIttle Guido	Akasaka ACT Theater, Tokyo, and Umeda Arts Theater, Osaka	
2024	Black Butler: Kishuku Gakkō no Himitsu	McMillan	Hyogo Performing Arts Center, Nishinomiya, and Tokyo Dome City Hall	
