= Apocalypse Bringer Mynoghra =

Japanese light novel series

- Apocalypse Bringer Mynoghra: World Conquest Starts with the Civilization of Ruin
- First light novel volume cover

異世界黙示録マイノグーラ～破滅の文明で始める世界征服～ (Isekai Mokushiroku Mainogūra: Hametsu no Bunmei de Hajimeru Sekai Seifuku)
- Genre: Isekai
- Novel series
- Written by: Fehu Kazuno
- Published by: Shōsetsuka ni Narō
- Original run: November 7, 2017 – present
- Light novel
- Written by: Fehu Kazuno
- Illustrated by: Jun
- Published by: Micro Magazine
- English publisher: NA: Cross Infinite World
- Imprint: GC Novels
- Original run: November 30, 2019 – present
- Volumes: 8
- Manga
- Written by: Fefu Kazuno
- Illustrated by: Yasaiko Midorihana
- Published by: ASCII Media Works
- English publisher: NA: Yen Press
- Imprint: Dengeki Comics NEXT
- Magazine: ComicWalker (Note: ComicWalker changed its name to KadoComi (カドコミ) in December 2023.)
- Original run: March 27, 2020 – present
- Volumes: 6
- Anime television series
- Directed by: Yūji Yanase
- Written by: Yuka Yamada; Kunihiko Okada
- Music by: Kujira Yumemi; Midori Narikiyo
- Studio: Maho Film
- Licensed by: Crunchyroll: SA/SEA: Muse Communication
- Original network: Tokyo MX, BS NTV
- Original run: July 6, 2025 – September 28, 2025
- Episodes: 13

Apocalypse Bringer Mynoghra: World Conquest Starts with the Civilization of Ruin (Japanese: 異世界黙示録マイノグーラ～破滅の文明で始める世界征服～, Hepburn: Isekai Mokushiroku Mainogūra: Hametsu no Bunmei de Hajimeru Sekai Seifuku) is a Japanese light novel series written by Fehu Kazuno and illustrated by Jun. It began serialization as a web novel published on the user-generated novel publishing website Shōsetsuka ni Narō in November 2017. It was later acquired by Micro Magazine who began publishing it under their GC Novels light novel imprint in November 2019. A manga adaptation illustrated by Yasaiko Midorihana began serialization on Kadokawa's ComicWalker manga website in March 2020. An anime television series adaptation produced by Maho Film premiered from July to September 2025.

== Premise ==
After dying young from illness, Takuto Ira finds himself reborn in "Eternal Nations", his favorite online game, as the ruler of Mynoghra; along with his demonic retainer Atou. Neither of them are sure what happened, but decided to found a settlement in the forest to live in peace. Pretty quickly, refugees of different races begin seeking asylum under his protection due to the racism of the human countries.

== Characters ==
Takuto Ira (伊良 拓斗, Ira Takuto)
Voiced by: Toshiki Kumagai
A young man who died from a disease and was reborn as the King of Ruin, the powerful lord and founder of Mynoghra, in "Eternal Nations". Classified by the world morality as "evil", he is nothing but a virtuous person, who looks out for others above his own needs. He has no desire to war with the other counties, but will defend his home should humans be stupid enough to try to attack his domain. He has a crush on Atou, who is his favorite character. He can also establish a psychic connection with his subordinates.
Though Atou and Takuto's other allies see him as human, the inhabitants of the world see him as dark smoke in human shape; making him look scary to others.
Atou (アトゥ, Atu)
Voiced by: Tomori Kusunoki
"Atou the sludge" is Takuto's right hand woman and leader of his Eight Heroes. She was seemly reborn in "Eternal Nations" under mysterious circumstances. Though she looks like an albino elf, it's just a skin suit hiding her true monstrous form. While a sadist in combat, Atou is friendly to allies and is often serving as emotional support to Takuto. She appears to have feelings for him.
Her abilities include deploying dark appendages from her back that can regenerate and stealing the memories of her targets that enables her to obtain their skills or find out information about their background.
Isla (イスラ, Isura)
Voiced by: Kikuko Inoue
The queen of the insect monsters who roam Takuto's lands. She resembles a giant praying mantis. Like Atou, she's friendly to allies and, as a personality trait, she often acts like a mother, but hostile to those who would threaten Mynoghra. She is also Maria and Caria's adoptive mother. She is killed by Flamin, who then passes her powers to Caria and Maria via eating her heart.
Emle (エムル, Emuru)
Voiced by: Rico Sasaki
A female dark elf who is good at handling foreign issues.
Maria (メアリア, Mearia)
Voiced by: Kaori Maeda
One of Takuto's attendants and Caria's older sister. They are Isla's adoptive daughters. Following Isla's death, they become fueled with revenge after gaining Isla's powers from eating her heart and begin their attack against the Demon Lord, but soon regain their senses.
Caria (キャリア, Kyaria)
Voiced by: Kanon Takao
One of Takuto's attendants and Maria's younger sister. They are Isla's adoptive daughters. Following Isla's death, they become fueled with revenge after gaining Isla's powers from eating her heart and begin their attack against the Demon Lord, but soon regain their senses.
Gear (ギア, Gia)
Voiced by: Shinji Kawada
A dark elf general who visited Takuto to get food for his kind. He grows to respect Takuto after he surprisingly helped his people and becomes a warrior captain.
Moltar (モルタール, Morutāru)
Voiced by: Tomomichi Nishimura
The leader of the dark elves. He appears to be wary of Takuto due to his knowledge of the King of Ruin, but soon agrees to form an alliance with him after he allows his kind to stay in his domain.
Soalina (ソアリーナ, Soarīna)
Voiced by: Akira Sekine
A saint who wields powerful magic. She is the leader of the Holy Kingdom of Qualia, who travels to the western regions to confront the malevolent witch Erakino. She is eventually killed by Erakino.
Verdal
A knight from Qualia, who leads an army to Mynoghra. He is killed by Atou.
Lonius
A knight from Qualia, who leads an army to Mynoghra. He is killed by Atou.
Bargo
A knight who accompanies Verdal and Lonius to Mynoghra. He is killed by Atou.
Erakino
A witch who can animate corpses. It is hinted that she is also a reincarnated human, and also appears to have the power to revive herself over time if she is killed. She eventually succeeds in defeating Soalina.
Pepe
A shaman who comes from Phon'Kaven. He is very friendly and naïve, sometimes leading to problems for others, especially Toukapoli.
Toukapoli
An elder beastkin from Phon'Kaven. She is actually still young despite her age.
Ichiro, Jiro, and Sakuro
The Brain Eaters, who are three bodyguards who work for Takuto. They may appear scary, but they also have amusing personalities. Maria takes a liking to them while Caria does not.
Atelise Antik
The elf mayor of Dragontan.
Vesta Kruklaine
An antagonistic merchant from Dragontan. He is killed by Takuto's bodyguards.
Demon Lord
The unnamed final boss of the classic game "Brave Questus". It is hinted that he is a reincarnated person like Takuto and Erakino. He is killed by an unidentified young man who is also a reincarnated person.
Flamin
One of the Demon Lord's four generals. He blows himself up to kill Isla, Caria, and Maria. This only mortally wounds Isla while the twins survive.
Ice Rock
One of the Demon Lord's four generals. He is killed by Atou.
Lady Wind and Old Mechanic
The Demon Lord's other two generals. They are killed by Caria and Maria.

== Media ==
=== Light novel ===
Written by Fefu Kazuno, Apocalypse Bringer Mynoghra: World Conquest Starts with the Civilization of Ruin began serialization on the user-generated novel publishing website Shōsetsuka ni Narō on November 7, 2017. It was later acquired by Micro Magazine who began releasing it with illustrations by Jun under their GC Novels light novel imprint on November 30, 2019. Eight volumes have been released as of June 2025.

On March 16, 2021, Cross Infinite World announced that they licensed the light novels for English publication. Cross Infinite World is also releasing audiobook versions.

No.	Original release date	Original ISBN	North American release date	North American ISBN
1	November 30, 2019	978-4-89637-944-0	June 30, 2021 (digital); September 6, 2021 (print)	978-1-945341-64-9
2	June 30, 2020	978-4-86716-023-7	November 19, 2021 (digital); February 1, 2022 (print)	978-1-945341-77-9
3	January 30, 2021	978-4-86716-107-4	April 22, 2022 (digital); June 22, 2022 (print)	979-8-88560-012-5
4	October 29, 2021	978-4-86716-204-0	November 30, 2022 (digital); January 23, 2023 (print)	979-8-88560-047-7
5	June 30, 2022	978-4-86716-311-5	June 30, 2023 (digital); November 28, 2023 (print)	979-8-88560-103-0
6	April 28, 2023	978-4-86716-420-4	March 29, 2024 (digital); April 26, 2024 (print)	979-8-88560-138-2
7	June 28, 2024	978-4-86716-594-2	July 31, 2025 (digital); November 12, 2025 (print)	979-8-88560-215-0
8	June 30, 2025	978-4-86716-785-4	April 30, 2026 (digital)	979-8-88560-218-1

=== Manga ===
A manga adaptation illustrated by Yasaiko Midorihana began serialization on Kadokawa's ComicWalker manga website on March 27, 2020. The manga adaptation's chapters have been collected by ASCII Media Works into six tankōbon volumes as of December 2024.

On January 5, 2024, Yen Press announced that they licensed the manga adaptation.

No.	Original release date	Original ISBN	North American release date	North American ISBN
1	September 26, 2020	978-4-04-913414-8	June 18, 2024	978-1-9753-8024-3
2	May 27, 2021	978-4-04-913703-3	November 19, 2024	978-1-9753-8026-7
3	January 27, 2022	978-4-04-914188-7	April 22, 2025	978-1-9753-8028-1
4	February 25, 2023	978-4-04-914906-7	August 26, 2025	978-1-9753-9466-0
5	November 27, 2023	978-4-04-915398-9	March 24, 2026	979-8-8554-0640-5
6	December 26, 2024	978-4-04-916166-3	August 25, 2026	979-8-8554-2426-3

=== Anime ===
An anime television series adaptation was announced on June 23, 2024. The series is produced by Maho Film and directed by Yūji Yanase, with series composition handled by Yuka Yamada, characters designed by Kaho Deguchi, and music composed by Kujira Yumemi and Midori Narikiyo. It premiered from July 6 to September 28, 2025, on Tokyo MX and BS NTV. The opening theme song is "Majestic Catastrophe" performed by Rico Sasaki, while the ending theme song is "more than W" performed by Takuma Terashima. Crunchyroll will stream the series. Muse Communication licensed the series in South and Southeast Asia.

==== Episodes ====
No.	Title	Directed by	Written by	Storyboarded by	Original release date
1	"New Game"	Yūji Yanase	Yuka Yamada	Yūji Yanase	July 6, 2025
After dying from a disease while playing his favorite game "Eternal Nations", Takuto Ira wakes up in a strange world where he is greeted by an elf woman named Atou. They both have been reincarnated into this world where Takuto himself is the ruler of Mynoghra, the large forest that they are in, and Atou is his second-in-command; the world itself is based on "Eternal Nations". At first confused of his new surroundings, he and Atou decide to start building a nation. Takuto summons a mantis-like beast and orders it to scout the forest. Atou and Takuto become smitten with each other (mostly because Atou is Takuto's favorite character in his old life) as the mantis creature discovers dark elves in the forest. Some of the dark elves meet them, though they see him as a dark smoke figure; a flashback reveals that they were driven from their homes and are suffering from hunger while growing fearful of the area's ruler, who is said to be evil. Gear, the male elf leading the small group, sees Takuto as a dark shape compared to Atou (who sees him as a normal person) and, despite being scared of him, begs for food. Takuto gives them a large supply of food without hesitation using Mana magic, allowing the dark elves to survive. Moltar, the leader of the dark elves, questions Gear about Takuto, whom he believes to be the King of Ruin and is said to cause chaos, but Gear grows to respect Takuto after seeing that he helped them. Still wary of Takuto, Moltar decides to speak with him. Atou is annoyed with Takuto for using Mana to help the dark elves, but she quickly forgives him due to her feelings for him as they continue their plans to build their nation.
2	"Let's Announce the Founding of Mynoghra"; Transliteration: "Mainogūra no Juritsu o Sengen Shiyou" (Japanese: マイノグーラの樹立を宣言しよう)	Naoyoshi Kusaka	Shunma Hara	Takeshi Mori	July 13, 2025
Gear and Moltar prepare to meet Takuto, with the mantis creature informing Takuto and Atou of this. During the meeting, Atou hopes to execute or evict the elves, but Takuto instead wants to negotiate with them. The dark elves eventually settle with leaving the forest, but Takuto decides to have them stay and convinces Atou to accept this so they can help found his nation. Heading to the dark elves' camp, Takuto accepts them all as citizens of his nation, which is named Mynoghra. However, Takuto discovers that the nearby kingdoms can pose a problem to his nation if they launch an attack. Moltar and Gear return and introduce an elf named Emle to help deal with foreign affairs. Moltar is assigned to help with national arrangements with his magic and Gear will be a warrior captain, but Takuto also reveals that he does not want to wage war and prefers peace. He and Atou also give them a lesson on reforestation, though Atou also gets the wrong idea. Takuto discovers that he can create certain objects like coins, which can prove useful. Dark elves then begin learning how to plant crops. Meanwhile, in the Holy Kingdom of Qualia, a kingdom located northeast of Mynoghra, a female saint named Soalina learns of dark activities going on in the western region and decides to deal with the situation.
3	"It's Time for Domestic Affairs!"; Transliteration: "Naisei no Jikan ga Yatte Mairimashita!" (Japanese: 内政の時間がやって参りました！)	Shigeki Awai	Kunihiko Okada	Takeshi Mori	July 20, 2025
Soalina travels to the western region with a group of soldiers, defeating a horde of goblins along the way. She then decides to enter the domain alone, though the cordial is not happy with this idea and attempts to send reinforcements. Meanwhile, the dark elves have built a new throne for Takuto, who is also given new attire. Atou begins the domestic affairs with Moltar, Gear, and Emle. She shows them a Flesh Tree which they intend to use as a food supply. Atou also gets the idea to create a combination of magic and technology to help with constructing their nation. Takuto also suggests creating a hero to serve him. Back in Qualia, a knight named Verdal prays for aid, but is interrupted by a knight named Lonius, who questions him about his family. A new residential area is built in Mynoghra, which mostly consists of treehouses, a field of Flesh Trees, and a spring filled with Cursed Terrain water that is actually quite beneficial. Atou reveals that she can be one of the heroes after showing the numerous dark tentacles that emerge from her back. The group also decide to build a palace, though Takuto is hesitant at first before the others convince him to accept this idea. Takuto also hopes to build a flying city someday. Meanwhile, Lonius and Verdal lead their forces to infiltrate Mynoghra under orders from Qualia.
4	"Live Never Goes the Way We Want it to, Does it?" Transliteration: "Jinsei to wa Mama Naranu Monodesu ne" (Japanese: 人生とはままならぬものですね)	Naoyoshi Kusaka	Koushi Bandai	Takeshi Mori	July 27, 2025
Lonius and Verdal continue their travel to Mynoghra. While stopping to rest at a bar, they learn of a witch's presence in the western region and that Soalina has gone to confront her, along with the dark elves that have taken refuge there. Meanwhile, Takuto uses his magic to turn a pile of Fresh Fruit into another mantis creature. He and Atou decide to create a hero using a being named Isla. The next day, the knights fight a Hill Giant. Verdal slays it using his magical sword. Takuto senses the knights coming and sends Atou to deal with them. Disguised as a dark elf, she goes to confront the knights. The knights refuse to turn back as they are still determined to investigate Mynoghra to see if the apocalypse bringer (Takuto) is real. When Verdal exposes their motive (to the dismay of the other knights), he finally agrees to leave after some convincing by Atou, but Lonius, suspicious of her and disgusted with Verdal's decision, takes command and orders the other knights to attack her. However, many of the knights are quickly slaughtered, leaving Verdal and Lonius among the only ones still alive; the two believing that Atou is the witch that they were talking about before.
5	"It's the Monster You've Been Looking For!"; Transliteration: "O Meate no Bakemonodesu yo" (Japanese: お目当ての化け物ですよ)	Yūji Yanase	Koushi Bandai	Yūji Yanase	August 3, 2025
The remaining knights find themselves unable to harm Atou, but Verdal and Lonius are able to slice off her dark tentacles. Atou then takes two of the surviving soldiers as hostages in an attempt to force them to stop attacking, but they still choose to kill their own allies to finish her off. This plan fails as Atou regenerates her tentacles and kills Verdal. As the remaining knights flee, Lonius fights Atou alone, to which she uses Verdal's sword to combat him, having stolen Verdal's abilities and memories. Lonius is eventually defeated while the dark elves slay the remaining knights to stop them from alerting Qualia. Atou interrogates Lonius about his loved ones before proceeding to kill him. Delivering the news to Takuto, he begins to see that the world is not completely the same as in the game. Using memories that Atou stole from the deceased knights, they learn that a witch named Erakino is the cause of a disturbance in the lands located west of Qualia while also suspecting that she's also a reincarnated person; however, he decides not to confront her. Takuto also intends to form an allegiance with the country located east of Mynoghra. Meanwhile, a war is going on in that kingdom.
6	"Are You a Bad Person, Your Majesty?"; Transliteration: "Ōsama wa Warui Hito?" (Japanese: 王さまは悪い人？)	Fumio Maezono	Yui Fukuo	Takeshi Mori	August 10, 2025
Takuto's new palace is finally done, but it lacks servants. Atou has Moltar bring all available young female dark elves to Takuto to be his servants. Two orphaned twins named Caria and Maria Elfuur are brought to Takuto, to which they learn that their mother sacrificed her own life to feed them using her own meat. The two agree to work for Takuto as his attendants, but Motlar informs him that the twins showed no remorse following their mother's death. Takuto and the others then continue their plans with building a city, with Takuto considering the idea of summoning the insect queen Isla. The twins question Takuto about his status and he explains that even though he is considerably bad, he won't always resort to killing. This convinces the twins to let out their emotions. Atou informs Takuto about a nearby town called Dragontan, which is built around a mine containing Dragon Veins, and a neighboring city called Phon'Kaven, both located in the eastern country. Takuto then prepares to make his next move.
7	"Please Be My Friend!"; Transliteration: "O Tomodachi ni Natte Kudasai!" (Japanese: お友達になってください！)	Niwa Motohiko	Shunma Hara	Takeshi Mori	August 17, 2025
Learning of monster attacks going on in Phon'Kaven, Takuto sends Atou and some of his subordinates to negotiate with the beastkin who have just arrived. A young mage named Pepe helps bargain with Atou and they are brought before Takuto. Toukapoli, the leader of the beastkin, recalls how reckless and naïve Pepe is. Pepe and Takuto quickly become friends and a dinner party is thrown to honor their allegiance. Takuto and Pepe play a few games as Pepe suggests trading between their nations, which Takuto agrees with as he was planning to do it anyway. Toukapoli informs Takuto about the attack that's been going on in their city. Takuto's group agree to help since they desire peace despite appearing evil. Later, while talking about their allegiance with Phon'Kaven, they decide to resolve the issue in Dragontan before agreeing to let Caria and Maria investigate Phon'Kaven, though Atou grows jealous of this. Takuto then expresses his feelings for Atou. Takuto then assigns some bodyguards called the Brain Eaters to protect Caria and Maria on their journey.
8	"What Humanlike Actions!"; Transliteration: "Nanto Ningen-teki Kōi!" (Japanese: なんと人間的行為！)	Naoyoshi Kusaka	Koushi Bandai	Takeshi Mori	August 24, 2025
Despite their intimidating appearance, the Brain Eaters are shown to be quite humorous. Takuto explains that not only can they fight, but are also experts on medication. He also names them. Maria becomes attracted to the bodyguards while Caria is a bit scared of them. In Dragontan, Atelise Antik, the city's mayor, gets frustrated with her job before the twins arrive to speak with her, but she is very wary of them. One of the Brain Eaters explains the reasons for their visit and she agrees to show them around while Takuto watches them through a crystal ball. Following their visit, the twins recall how poor the city's condition is and a bodyguard hands over a healthy plant called Popil Grass that's being sold in the city, and they decide to continue investigating. While observing a field of crystals, they meet a merchant named Vesta Kruklaine, who is interested in cultivating Popil Grass in the area and proposes a deal with the twins, but they do not show up as they are distrustful of him. During another meeting with Antik, Vesta arrives to remind them of the deal, but Maria reveals that she already knew about his true intentions. Vesta on the other hand intends to dose them with a drug made from Popil Grass to enslave them, but he and his men are quickly defeated by the Brain Eaters, who reveals their true monstrous forms; this experience frightens Antik.
9	"It's Well Past Your Bedtime, Dears"; Transliteration: "Moutokku ni Neru Jikan Desu yo" (Japanese: もうとっくに寝る時間ですよ)	Yūko Ohba	Kunihiko Okada	Kyohei Oyabu	August 31, 2025
Atou is annoyed with Takuto, the twins, and the Brain Eaters for their reckless actions and forces them to write essays. They begin their plans to deal with Dragontan, which is now falling into disarray, along with monster attacks that have been happening nearby. Using some of the kingdom's products, Takuto summons the insect queen Isla, who swears loyalty to him as a summoned hero while also becoming attracted to Atou. Takuto sends Atou along with some of the dark elves to help Dragontan while Isla is tasked with protecting Mynoghra and taking over for Atou in her absence. While the twins give Isla a tour around the kingdom, they come across Emle, who is overstressed with the damages that Gear caused until Isla comforts her. Isla continues to spend time with the twins and the other dark elves for the rest of the day. That night, Isla comforts the twins after one of them suffers from a nightmare. Meanwhile, Atou leads her army against the monsters approaching Dragontan.
10	"Go Forth and Conquer"; Transliteration: "Seifuku Seyo" (Japanese: 征服せよ)	Hideya Yoshida	Koushi Bandai	Takeshi Mori	September 7, 2025
Atou manages to wipe out the monsters easily, though her actions continues to scare Antik. A Hill Giant appears, though Moltar and Atou manage to take it down, but the monster also leaves behind gold coins when its body vanished. Viewing the coins through his telepathic connection to Atou, Takuto realizes that they are collectables from a classic game called "Brave Questus", which he played in his past life. Another hoard of monsters appear, led by a Demon Lord, who are also from "Brave Questus". Meanwhile, Soalina arrives at the western region where Erakino has been wreaking havoc. Confronting the troublesome witch, she summons animated corpses to attack Soalina, but Soalina easily takes them down and kills her, though she knows that Erakino will revive soon. The Demon Lord orders his two generals Flamin and Ice Rock to attack Dragontan, but Ice Rock and his minions are hindered by dark magic before Atou confronts Ice Rock. Ice Rock attempts to convince Atou to join forces, but she declines and recalls his role as a boss that is meant to be defeated. Ice Rock eventually wounds Atou, but she kills Ice Rock with a surprise attack and gains his powers. However, she discovers that Flamin has begun to launch an attack on Mynoghra.
11	"Alright, It's Time to Turn the Tables"; Transliteration: "Itte Makikaesu to Shiyou ka" (Japanese: 一手巻き返すとしようか)	Ryosuke Higashi	Koushi Bandai	Takeshi Mori	September 14, 2025
As the Demon Lord begins his plans to conquer the lands, Takuto prepares for battle against Flamin's forces. Isla suspects that the Demon Lord may be a reincarnated person too, but since it's too late for peace, Takuto decides to fight back and sends Isla, Gear, the Brain Eaters, and some larvae to fight them. As Emile helps evacuate citizens and set up the battlefield, Takuto provides mana to help Isla, though Caria and Maria worry for her since she has become their adaptive mother at this point. The larvae manage to repel the first wave of Flamin's troops before Isla arrives. Having looked down on Ice Rock, Flamin prepares to fight Isla, who summons larvae while Flamin summons more monsters. During the fight, Isla wonders if Flamin is just a puppet to the Demon Lord, but he shows little regard to this. Isla eventually wins the fight, with Flamin accepting defeat after recalling Isla's words. Isla's psychic connection is cut off as Caria and Maria suddenly appear unexpectedly; they and Takuto sense that something's off. Flamin's corpse then smiles.
12	"The Moon is Beautiful, Isn't It?"; Transliteration: "Otsukisama ga Kirei desu ne" (Japanese: お月様が綺麗ですね)	Kyohei Oyabu	Kunihiko Okada	Kyohei Oyabu	September 21, 2025
Isla cannot communicate with Takuto and escapes with the twins, but come across a still-alive Flamin, who is revealed to be an animated corpse that cannot be killed. He then seizes control of their bodies and makes the twins walk towards him. Takuto realizes that this is a key event that occurred in "Brave Questus", which Flamin is taking advantage of. Flamin mocks Takuto before triggering a self-destruct spell to wipe them out. The twins find themselves on a tree in Mynoghra where they watch the full moon, which is revealed to be a dream. The twins wake up back in the woods, having miraculously survived the blast, but Isla is badly wounded. They still cannot communicate with Takuto. Knowing that she will die soon, Isla gives the twins her heart to transfer her powers to them. Meanwhile, Atou continues to fight off monsters while attempting to return to Takuto. After sensing Isla's death, Atou loses her temper while Takuto wonders how Flamin's death event happened in this world, as it shouldn't be possible. After eating Isla's heart, the now-vengeful twins head to the enemies' domain, now wielding Isla's powers. Takuto, who is still able to communicate with Atou, sends her after the twins while telling the dark elves to return to Mynoghra. The twins confront Lady Wind and Old Mechanic, the Demon Lord's remaining two generals, effortlessly killing them and their armies out of hate before preparing to confront the Demon Lord.
13	"And So Begins the Game of Gods"; Transliteration: "Soshite Kamigani no Yūgi ga Hajimaru" (Japanese: そして神々の遊戯が始まる)	Yūji Yanase	Kunihiko Okada	Yūji Yanase	September 28, 2025
The Demon Lord, who has a belief in God, is confronted by the twins. The Demon Lord sets up a barrier, but the twins dispel it with ease. Unfazed, the Demon Lord transforms into his true monstrous form, but his every attack is rendered ineffective by the twins. The Demon Lord is then killed by a mysterious young man who possesses remarkable strength. Angered that he robbed them of their revenge, the twins prepare to fight him, but are stopped by Atou. The twins refuse to back down, but upon remembering Takuto's words and how Isla had treated them so much like a mother, they regain their senses and stop their revenge. The man then leaves, to which he is suspected to be another reincarnated person due to him wearing a Japanese school uniform. Atou sadly explains that Isla cannot be brought back. Takuto reviews how the game worlds are somehow connecting and the cheat skills that he has is being used by others. Meanwhile, the young man expresses fear of his experience before meeting a girl who becomes his partner, both having the same roles as Takuto and Atou. Soalina confronts a revived Erakino, who defeats Soalina this time, but also learns about Mynoghra. Takuto grows frustrated with the situation, but upon discovering that he has superhuman strength, he regains his confidence. Takuto decides not to punish the twins for their treason as he blames himself for what happened and vows to find a way to revive Isla, though Atou worries about the situation. To accomplish this, Takuto decides to take over the world and creates modern guns to prepare for his scheme. Despite concerns, the dark elves agree to help him. The next day, Takuto is regretful of his behavior, but decides to continue with his goal with the help of Atou and the twins.
