= Fluffy Paradise =

Japanese light novel series

- First light novel volume cover

異世界でもふもふなでなでするためにがんばってます。 (Isekai de Mofumofu Nadenade Suru Tameni Ganbattemasu)
- Genre: Isekai
- Novel series
- Written by: Himawari
- Published by: Shōsetsuka ni Narō
- Original run: November 5, 2012 – present
- Light novel
- Written by: Himawari
- Illustrated by: Kiouran
- Published by: Futabasha
- English publisher: NA: Cross Infinite World
- Imprint: M Novels f
- Original run: July 15, 2016 – August 10, 2026
- Volumes: 21
- Manga
- Written by: Himawari
- Illustrated by: Yuriko Takagami
- Published by: Futabasha
- English publisher: NA: Coolmic
- Magazine: Gaugau Monster
- Original run: November 6, 2017 – present
- Volumes: 17
- Anime television series
- Directed by: Jun'ichi Kitamura
- Written by: Deko Akao
- Music by: Satoshi Hōno; Ryūnosuke Kasai
- Studio: EMT Squared
- Licensed by: Crunchyroll
- Original network: Tokyo MX, BS11, ytv
- Original run: January 7, 2024 – March 24, 2024
- Episodes: 12
- icon

Fluffy Paradise (異世界でもふもふなでなでするためにがんばってます。, Isekai de Mofumofu Nadenade Suru Tameni Ganbattemasu; lit. "I'll Try My Best So I Can Pet and Pat in Another World") is a Japanese light novel series written by Himawari. Originally posted to the Shōsetsuka ni Narō novel posting website in November 2012, the series was later acquired by Futabasha, who published the series in 21 volumes with illustrations by Kiouran from July 2016 to August 2026 under their M Novels f imprint. A manga adaptation with illustrations by Yuriko Takagami began serialization on Futabasha's Gaugau Monster manga website in November 2017. As of April 2026, the series' individual chapters have been collected into seventeen volumes. An anime television series adaptation aired from January to March 2024.

== Synopsis ==
A 27-year-old office lady, Midori Akitsu, abruptly dies from overwork just after returning home. In her life, her greatest passion was to touch and pet fluffy animals; after her sudden death, a god offers to restore her in another world, where her wish will come true.

Midori is reborn as a noble-born little girl named Nefeltima Osphe (Néma for short) in the world of Asdyllon, which is inhabited by humans and fantastic creatures. The humans, however, violently discriminate against their non-human cohabitants, and therefore God leaves her with the choice to decide whether or not they deserve to be wiped out. He grants Néma the ability to attract the affection of non-human beings, which she uses to befriend a number of animals and mythological creatures.

== Characters ==
Néma (ネマ, Nema) / Nefertima Osphe (ネフェルティマ・オスフェ, Neferutima Osufe)
Voiced by: Ai Kakuma
The story's 3-year-old main protagonist, who was formerly known as Midori Akitsu (安芸津 緑, Akitsu Midori) on Earth, having died from overworking. She is reborn in Adsyllon to the ducal family of Osphe of the kingdom of Gaché, and is granted the ability to positively attract non-human creatures to herself.
Ralph Osphe (ラルフ・オスフェ, Rarufu Osufe)
Voiced by: Shūichirō Umeda
Néma's 13-year-old elder brother, the oldest child of the Osphe family, and fourth in the line to the throne of the kingdom of Gaché.
Kanadia Osphe (カーナディア・オスフェ, Kānadia Osufe)
Voiced by: Haruki Iwata
Néma's 10-year-old elder sister, and the Osphe family's second-oldest child. An energetic girl, she is skilled in fire magic.
Daleland Osphe (デールラント・オスフェ, Dērurando Osufe) / Dale (デール, Dēru)
Voiced by: Tōru Furuya
Néma's doting father, the patriarch of the Osphe family, and the Prime Minister of Gaché. He stands third in the line of succession to the kingdom, and is attuned to fire magic.
Cerulia Osphe (セルリア・オスフェ, Seruria Osufe)
Voiced by: Ayumi Tsunematsu
Daleland's wife, Néma's mother, and head of the Royal Magic Research Center's engineering department of the kingdom of Gaché.
Lars (ラース, Rāsu)
Voiced by: Taketora
The pet of the royal family of the kingdom of Gaché, a gigantic white tiger, and the first mythological creature whom Néma befriends. He is a Sky Tiger, a Holy Beast attuned to the element of air.
Wilhert Rega Gaché (ヴィルヘルト・レガ・ガシェ, Viruheruto Rega Gashe)
Voiced by: Genki Okawa
The teenage son and crown prince of Gaché's royal family, Lars' bond partner, and Ralph's schoolmate at the Academy. Is commonly nicknamed Vir. After meeting Néma while she was first petting Lars, he takes a liking to her.
God (神様, Kami-sama)
Voiced by: Shin-ichiro Miki
The deity who reincarnates Midori into Asdyllon.
Sol (ソル, Soru)
Voiced by: Kenji Nomura
A fire dragon and Holy Beast attuned to the element of fire who chooses to bond with Néma and gifts her with a jewel which links their minds, enabling her to use his magic if needed. Néma wears the jewel in the form of a bowtie for her plush bear.
Shinki (森鬼)
Voiced by: Tomoaki Maeno
Originally the leader of a goblin pack, he befriends Néma and assumes the form of a human man with blue hair and horns on his head.
Gauldi Russ Gachè (ガルディー・ラス・ガシェ, Garudī Rasu Gashe)
Voiced by: Kenji Hamada
The ruler of the kingdom of Gaché and Wilhert's father.
High Priest
The scheming sovereign of the Church of Divine Creation in the kingdom of Gaché.
Gwynn Field (グウェン・フィールズ, Gūen Fīruzu)
Voiced by: Shintarō Asanuma
The leader of Gaché's Royal Guard's second brigade, and Dan Yates' former mate at the Royal Academy.
Dan Yates (ダン・イェーツ, Dan Iētsu)
Voiced by: Genta Nakamura
The captain of Gaché's royal Dragon Knights, and a former member of the Beast Knight Legions. He has personal issues with Gwynn.
Lestin Ogma (レスティン・オグマ, Resutin Oguma)
Voiced by: Atsushi Tamaru
The captain of the royal Beast Knight Legions.
Tristan Disdall
Ralph's scornful and conceited rival at the Royal Academy.
Lestin Ogma
The captain of the royal Beast Knight Legions.
Paul
A servant who works for the Osphes.
Nox
Nema's pet rain hawk.
Annalee Dessa
Nema's strict and harsh tutor.
Pino and Nino
Twins whom Nema befriends after being captured by goblins. They are Earl Ireiga's children
Gratia
The child of a frost spider. After her mother was killed, Nema took her in and named her.
Earl Ireiga
Pino and Nino's father.
Healran Dewitt
Cass's financial auditor who resents the mayor.
Belle
A woman that Nema met in Cass. She runs a guild.
Dylan Hoctis
A military commander from Lenice.
Marquis Parzeth
The ruler of Lenice.
Belgar
The hot tempered son of an adventurer, who hates kobolds. Despite his antagonism, he bears no malice and wishes to be like his father.
Phillip
An adventurer who is a friend of Daleland's.
Shizuku
A parent slime and Haku's mate. It merges with Nema as it cannot move while having offspring.
Haku
A slime who serves as Shizuku's mate.
Lord of the Forest
A sentient tree who protects the kobolds from humans that are threatening them.
Sicily
The kobold leader, who is also a star reader.
Spica
A young star wolf beastperson, whose name was given to her by Nema. She is Sicily's adoptive sister, who also has trust issues towards humans, but soon warms up to Nema and is even willing to serve her.
Hanley
A furry kobold who Nema meets in the kobold village.
Fika
A kobold who is the father of the young kobold that Nema rescued.
Gou and Roku/Seigo and Rikusei
Two of Fika's children. They are later renamed by Nema.
Luck
A member of Red Hlaada. He is a beastperson with a great sense of smell.
Yuga Alsto
A member of Red Hlaada.

== Media ==
=== Light novel ===
The light novel began publication online on the novel posting website Shōsetsuka ni Narō on November 5, 2012. The series was later acquired by Futabasha, who began publishing the series with illustrations by Kiouran on July 15, 2016, under their M Novels f imprint. The series ended with the release of its 21st volume on August 10, 2026.

In June 2023, Cross Infinite World announced that they licensed the series in English.

==== Volumes ====
| No. | Original release date | Original ISBN | English release date | English ISBN |
|---|---|---|---|---|
| 1 | July 15, 2016 | 978-4-575-23973-7 | September 29, 2023 (digital) | 979-8-88560-101-6 |
| 2 | December 16, 2016 | 978-4-575-24009-2 | November 30, 2023 (digital) | 979-8-88560-102-3 |
| 3 | June 16, 2017 | 978-4-575-24037-5 | January 31, 2024 (digital) | 979-8-88560-112-2 |
| 4 | December 15, 2017 | 978-4-575-24074-0 | April 30, 2024 (digital) | 979-8-88560-113-9 |
| 5 | June 15, 2018 | 978-4-575-24101-3 | September 30, 2024 (digital) | 979-8-88560-147-4 |
| 6 | December 14, 2018 | 978-4-575-24138-9 | December 31, 2024 (digital) | 979-8-88560-152-8 |
| 7 | June 14, 2019 | 978-4-575-24181-5 | March 31, 2025 (digital) | 979-8-88560-161-0 |
| 8 | December 20, 2019 | 978-4-575-24237-9 | April 30, 2026 (digital) | 979-8-88560-231-0 |
| 9 | July 15, 2020 | 978-4-575-24298-0 | July 31, 2026 (digital) | 979-8-88560-232-7 |
| 10 | January 15, 2021 | 978-4-575-24367-3 | September 30, 2026 (digital) | 979-8-88560-233-4 |
| 11 | August 11, 2021 | 978-4-575-24429-8 | — | — |
| 12 | January 14, 2022 | 978-4-575-24482-3 | — | — |
| 13 | July 8, 2022 | 978-4-575-24541-7 | — | — |
| 14 | January 7, 2023 | 978-4-575-24594-3 | — | — |
| 15 | July 10, 2023 | 978-4-575-24650-6 | — | — |
| 16 | January 10, 2024 | 978-4-575-24710-7 | — | — |
| 17 | July 10, 2024 | 978-4-575-24752-7 | — | — |
| 18 | January 10, 2025 | 978-4-575-24792-3 | — | — |
| 19 | July 10, 2025 | 978-4-575-24828-9 | — | — |
| 20 | January 9, 2026 | 978-4-575-24864-7 | — | — |
| 21 | August 10, 2026 | 978-4-575-24913-2 | — | — |

=== Manga ===
A manga adaptation with illustrations by Yuriko Takagami began serialization on Futabasha's Gaugau Monster manga website on November 6, 2017. The series' individual chapters have been collected into seventeen tankōbon volumes as of April 30, 2026.

Coolmic is publishing the manga in English.

==== Volumes ====
| No. | Japanese release date | Japanese ISBN |
|---|---|---|
| 1 | April 28, 2018 | 978-4-575-41025-9 |
| 2 | October 31, 2018 | 978-4-575-41036-5 |
| 3 | April 30, 2019 | 978-4-575-41054-9 |
| 4 | October 30, 2019 | 978-4-575-41082-2 |
| 5 | April 30, 2020 | 978-4-575-41117-1 |
| 6 | October 30, 2020 | 978-4-575-41164-5 |
| 7 | April 30, 2021 | 978-4-575-41230-7 |
| 8 | October 29, 2021 | 978-4-575-41314-4 |
| 9 | April 28, 2022 | 978-4-575-41407-3 |
| 10 | October 28, 2022 | 978-4-575-41516-2 |
| 11 | April 28, 2023 | 978-4-575-41635-0 |
| 12 | December 26, 2023 | 978-4-575-41796-8 |
| 13 | April 30, 2024 | 978-4-575-41873-6 |
| 14 | October 30, 2024 | 978-4-575-42006-7 |
| 15 | April 30, 2025 | 978-4-575-42140-8 |
| 16 | October 30, 2025 | 978-4-575-42275-7 |
| 17 | April 30, 2026 | 978-4-575-42407-2 |

=== Anime ===
An anime adaptation was announced on July 9, 2022. It was later revealed to be a television series produced by EMT Squared and directed by Jun'ichi Kitamura, with scripts supervised by Deko Akao, and character designs handled by Asami Miyazaki. It was initially scheduled for 2023, but was later delayed as a result of "various circumstances". The series aired from January 7 to March 24, 2024, on Tokyo MX and other networks. The opening theme song is "Cotton Days", performed by Sizuk, and the ending theme song is "Fuwa Fuwa Party Tsurarete Happy" (ふわふわpartyつられてhappy), performed by harmoe. Crunchyroll streamed the series outside of Asia.

==== Episodes ====
| No. | Title | Directed by (Note: Information is taken from the ending credits of each episode.) | Written by | Storyboarded by | Original release date (Note: Episodes are released on ABEMA a week before their air dates on television.) |
|---|---|---|---|---|---|
| 1 | "Nobody Told Me This Would Happen!"; Transliteration: "Kono Tenkai wa Kītenai!" (Japanese: この展開は聞いてない！) | Junichi Kitamura | Deko Akao | Junichi Kitamura | January 7, 2024 |
Midori Akitsu, a young Japanese office lady, abruptly collapses and dies right after returning home from work. A deity grants her the chance to be reincarnated in the world of Asdyllon in order to judge whether its human population, who persecute non-humans, deserve to be eliminated. In return for this service, God grants Midori a special ability; and having longed to pet fluffy animals all life long, Midori gains the ability to attract the affection of non-humans. Midori is reborn as Néma Opshe, a duke's daughter, with the memories of her old life intact. When Néma is three years old, her mother takes her to her workplace at the royal palace, where she encounters and befriends Lars, the royal family's Sky Tiger pet, and Wilhert, the kingdom's crown prince. Another day, she and her parents visit the Royal Academy attended by her older siblings, where she finds that Wilhert and her older brother Ralph are schoolmates. When her sister Kanadia undergoes a test for her magical abilities and accidentally summons a Fire Dragon, Néma impulsively jumps into the arena to shield the dragon from getting attacked.
| 2 | "I've been Summoned"; Transliteration: "Yobidashi Kuraimashita" (Japanese: 呼び出しくらいました) | Shun Tsuchida | Deko Akao | Koichi Ohata | January 14, 2024 |
To everyone's utter amazement, Néma not only calms down the fire dragon, whose name is Sol, to give him pats, but he also chooses to form a pact with her when she is old enough and gifts her with a magical jewel before leaving peacefully. This incident leads to an audience and inquiry by the royal family, and it is determined that a divine influence must have called Sol to the arena. Therefore, the nobles of the royal court begin planning to use Néma to call upon the Holy Beasts' favor and thus make the realm prosper. The next day, Néma meets Gwynn Field, a captain of the Royal Guard, and his competitor Dan Yates, captain of the Royal Dragon Knights, and is taken to the royal dragon stables. Wishing to pet one of the dragons, Néma uses Sol's jewel to attract their attention, and their pack leader, Ghizel, befriends her to Gwynn and Dan's supreme puzzlement.
| 3 | "A Lovely Gift"; Transliteration: "Sutekina Okurimono" (Japanese: ステキな贈り物) | Han Yeonghan | Yoriko Tomita | Kazuya Monma | January 21, 2024 |
Next, Néma is taken to Lestin Ogma, captain of the royal Beast Knight Legions, who is skeptical of her. But as she is led around and introduced to the various beasts used by the royal army for specialized purposes, Lestin becomes convinced of Néma's ability to sway even the most renitent animals to her side. Upon her return home, her parents celebrate Néma's birthday by granting her a wish, and accompanied by Kanadia and a servant named Paul, she is allowed to go on a shopping trip to the royal capital. Afterward, they return to the palace, where Néma is showered with gifts by her family, the royal family, and the captains; among the presents is a young rain hawk, whom she names Nox.
| 4 | "I Hate Studying!"; Transliteration: "Benkyō wa Kirai Desu" (Japanese: 勉強は嫌いです) | Akira Shimizu | Azuki Azuki | Junichi Kitamura | January 28, 2024 |
Néma's ability to spend time with her new friends is curtailed as she has to begin studying under her new tutor, Annalee Dessa. Dessa proves to be a stern taskmaster, and her harsh approach at first drains Néma until her brother and mother advise her to challenge Miss Dessa into acknowledging her as a proper lady. In time, Néma discovers that the Church of Divine Creation, of which Dessa is a member, maintains an elitist attitude against non-humans. When she is five years old, Néma is taken by her father to the northern provinces of the kingdom, which are under her family's supervision, to organize a defense against repeated incursions by monsters from the Needle Frost Forest. After Néma consults Sol through his gem, she learns that the monsters - mostly goblins - are not native to this region, indicating that something must have driven them here.
| 5 | "Surprised by the Monsters in the Forest!"; Transliteration: "Mori no Mamono de Bikkuri Desu!" (Japanese: 森の魔物でびっくりです) | Masayuki Iimura | Saeka Fujimoto | Masayuki Iimura | February 4, 2024 |
Néma accompanies her father and a group of hunters into the forest to investigate the goblin incursions. Separating from the others to help a wounded rabbit, Néma is captured by a goblin band and interred with two other children, fraternal twins Pino and Nino. To her surprise, she discovers that the goblins are actually pacifistic creatures, and she meets their hobgoblin leader, who tells her that they and the other monsters were driven out of their former home by hostile humans. In order to help both sides, she devises a plan to appease her father before he can massacre the goblins. The plan succeeds, albeit with some difficulties, but then the group is menaced by a giant frost spider.
| 6 | "The Desire to Become Stronger"; Transliteration: "Tsuyokunaritai Kimochi" (Japanese: 強くなりたい気持ち) | Junichi Kitamura | Deko Akao | Junichi Kitamura | February 11, 2024 |
The hobgoblin battles the frost spider and beats it down, but then Néma establishes a connection with it and discovers that the dying spider was merely trying to feed its offspring. Moved by the suffering of all the nonhuman creatures, Néma vows to become stronger so she can make them all happy. Unexpectedly, the hobgoblin suddenly assumes a more human-like form, and upon learning of this, Sol declares to visit the next day to take a look at him. Néma also adopts the frost spider's baby and names it Gratia; a deed which, as the hobgoblin explains, evolves creatures and grants them power. As they return the liberated humans to the village, Néma and Daleland learn that Pino and Nino are the children of Earl Ireiga, the lord of a nearby province, and before they are brought home, they invite Néma to visit them. When Sol arrives, he confirms that the hobgoblin has gained command of all four major elements, and Néma names him Shinki, thereby inadvertently - but with his consent - making him her servant.
| 7 | "I Believe I Can Be of Service"; Transliteration: "Oka ni Nawareroto on Imasu" (Japanese: おかになわれろと恩います) | Han Yeonghan | Yoriko Tomita | Koji Sasaki | February 18, 2024 |
Néma suggests to her father to erect an isolated habitat for displaced nonhumans, which can be turned into training grounds for adventurers if the monsters overpopulate, before she, her father and Shinki continue their inspection tour. While stopping in the town of Cass, Néma visits the local adventurers guild, where she meets Belle, the guild's receptionist, and overhears Healran Dewitt, the town's financial auditor, complaining about the mayor. After offering her help, and learning that the mayor is falsifying reports about monster attacks and embezzling the government's restitution money, while knight detachments sent to help are hindered by surprisingly organized kobold bands, Néma decides to seek out the mayor. At the mayor's mansion, she meets her father, her brother Ralph (who is to replace his father on the tour), Prince Wilhert and Lars, and after some explanations, Duke Osphe exposes the corrupt mayor and has him detained.
| 8 | "A Lot's Been Decided"; Transliteration: "Toria Korezu Iroiro Kimarimashita" (Japanese: とりあ之 ずいろいろ決まりました) | Sota Shiro | Azuki Azuki | Junichi Kitamura | February 25, 2024 |
Healran and Belle are invited to work at the Opshe family's estate at Néma's request, and Shinki has managed to get the other goblins to serve him. The group then decides to deal with the kobolds that are threatening Lenice, who are led by a werewolf. After Daleland returns home, he and his family begin organizing the establishment of a monster refuge, and learn that Phillip, an old adventuring companion of Daleland's, will be arriving soon. The next day, Néma's group journeys to Lenice. As they speak with Marquis Parzeth, the lord of Lenice, he informs them that a group called the Red Hlaada are coming over to help deal with the kobolds. Néma requests to explore the city, and saves a young kobold from a group of children led by Belgar, the son of an adventurer who seeks to become like his father. After the bullies leave, Néma decides to return the kobold to its family, despite the potential danger.
| 9 | "Guardian of the Forest, Please...!"; Transliteration: "Mori no Aruji-sama o Gen Idesu...!" (Japanese: 森の主様お原いです...!) | Koji Sasaki | Saeka Fujimoto | Noriyuki Nakamura | March 3, 2024 |
While Néma's group wanders through the woods, trying to find the kobold pup's tribe, they encounter a slime asking for help in giving birth to its offspring. In order to help it, Néma allows the parent slime, whom she names Shizuku, to fuse itself with her, thereby forming a symbiotic bond, and take its progeny, named Haku, with them. Guided by spirits, they reach an ancient, sentient tree, the lord of the forest who protects the kobolds from human persecution. Convincing it that she only has the good of these creatures in mind, Néma is granted access to their camp; and on the way they bring down several edible giant beetles called mamushi to gift their meat to the kobolds. They meet their leader, who gets upset because the pup was abandoned by its tribemates, but Néma tries to calm her down and begin negotiations to move them into their new sanctuary.
| 10 | "Let's Have a Strategy Meeting!"; Transliteration: "Sakusen Kaigi o Shō" (Japanese: 作戦会議をしょう) | Masayuki Iimura | Saeka Fujimoto | Masayuki Iimura | March 10, 2024 |
Sicily, the kobolds' leader, refuses to trust Néma as she has personal issues towards humans for their constant, indiscriminate attacks against her people in the past. As a star-reader, she already knows about the upcoming attack, but then learns that Néma is their savior. Néma's group returns to Lenice, and after learning that Will has been granted special authorization against the royal knights in the attack force, Nema returns to the kobolds' village and is able to convince Sicily to help her. As the kobolds plan for their survival against the attack, Néma also meets a kobold named Hanley; a young Star Wolf girl, Sicily's adoptive sister, who is assigned as Néma's protector; Fika, the father of the kobold pup Néma rescued earlier, and two of his children, Gou and Roku. Sicily's sister is revealed to have trust issues towards humans, but is convinced to accept Néma's help. Néma's entourage then encounters Dylan Noctis, the leader of the kobold extermination force, and requests to join the fight. Nema also notices that Healran is in disguise nearby. Then the commander is informed of an emergency which left several knights severely injured.
| 11 | "The Path I Choose"; Transliteration: "Watashi ga Eranda Michi" (Japanese: 私が選んだ道) | Hisashi Ishii | Deko Akao | Koji Sasaki | March 17, 2024 |
After Ralph assists in healing the wounded knights, Healran, who has infiltrated the knight band, reports that the regional commander has been taking bribes from adventurers to embellish their achievements, and Wilhert charges him with securing evidence. Red Hlaada arrives the next day, and the kobolds and Néma's group prepare for battle. The extermination force, bolstered by Red Hlaada, enters the woods, only to walk into a well-planned ambush in which they suffer as few casualties as possible due to Néma's insistence. Red Hlaada suspect that a human is helping the kobolds. Ralph, who accompanies the force as a healer, privately reveals to Red Hlaada and Dylan Noctis that the recent monster attacks in the region are actually part of a foul play by an organization which he provisionally calls "Runohark". But before they can call for a retreat, a sudden lightning strike incapacitates the elimination force, and the kobolds and Néma's team have disappeared.
| 12 | "After the Battle"; Transliteration: "Tatakai no Ato wa" (Japanese: 戦いのあとは) | Junichi Kitamura | Deko Akao | Junichi Kitamura | March 24, 2024 |
In the aftermath of the battle, many of the kobolds are slain, leaving Nema's side devastated. Shinki casts a lightning strike (the same strike from the previous episode) to knock out the soldiers, allowing the kobolds to escape. Nema blames herself for the loss of the deceased kobolds, but is convinced to let go of her pain and persuades the others to do the same. She then plans to have the kobolds move to Mount Leitimo where they will be safe from humans. Sicily requests for Nema to accept service from her adoptive sister and she agrees, naming her Spica. Nema also gives Gou and Roku new names: Seigo and Rikusei. Nema's group return home, where Healran gives them receipts, which are evidence that the fight is being staged. They later attend a banquet hosted by the extermination squad to celebrate their success in supposedly killing all the kobolds. Suspicious of the general, Nema sends Shinki to spy on him. She also meets Luck, whom she recognizes from the battle, and bonds with him. After another meeting with Belgar, she reunites with Karna. Later that night, Sol arrives and takes Nema on a ride to show her the rest of the world, and she vows to continue her plan to have humans and beasts live in peace with each other.

== Reception ==
The light novels and manga combined have 1.6 million copies in circulation.
