= This Alluring Dark Elf Has the Heart of a Middle-Aged Man! =

Japanese light novel series

- First light novel volume cover

私の心はおじさんである (Watashi no Kokoro wa Ojisan de Aru)
- Genre: Adventure, isekai
- Novel series
- Written by: Yūhi Shimano
- Published by: Kakuyomu
- Original run: January 8, 2022 – present
- Light novel
- Written by: Yūhi Shimano
- Illustrated by: Naji Yanagida
- Published by: Shufu to Seikatsu Sha
- English publisher: NA: Cross Infinite World
- Imprint: PASH! Books
- Original run: June 2, 2023 – present
- Volumes: 4
- Manga
- Written by: Yūhi Shimano
- Illustrated by: Utsugi
- Published by: Shufu to Seikatsu Sha
- English publisher: NA: J-Novel Club
- Imprint: PASH! Comics
- Magazine: Comic PASH!
- Original run: April 26, 2024 – present
- Volumes: 5

This Alluring Dark Elf Has the Heart of a Middle-Aged Man! (私の心はおじさんである, Watashi no Kokoro wa Ojisan de Aru) is a Japanese light novel series written by Yūhi Shimano and illustrated by Naji Yanagida. It began serialization on Kadokawa Corporation's Kakuyomu website in January 2022. It was later acquired by Shufu to Seikatsu Sha who began publishing it under their PASH! Books imprint in June 2023. A manga adaptation illustrated by Utsugi began serialization on Shufu to Seikatsu Sha's Comic PASH! website in April 2024.

== Synopsis ==
Haruka Yamagishi is a middle-aged salaryman with no friends, family, or romance in his life. Haruka has never been good at expressing himself, and has closed himself off from interactions, leaving him a lonely old man. One day, he wakes up to find that not only has he been transported to another world, he has also been transformed into an attractive female dark elf. Despite getting a body filled with mana, Haruka still struggles to express himself in this new world. He later meets some adventurers and joins their party.

== Characters ==
Haruka Yamagishi (山岸 遥香, Yamagishi Haruka)
A 43-year-old, formerly male, salaryman who wakes up one day in a fantasy world as a beautiful female dark elf with vast magical potential. Having never been any good at expressing herself, she had no family, lover, or even any friends in her previous world. While she initially continues to wander aimlessly through her new life, things begin to change when, to make ends meet, she applies to become an adventurer and forms a party with a group of rookies half her age, causing the former middle-aged man to slowly open her heart.

== Media ==
=== Light novel ===
Written by Yūhi Shimano, This Alluring Dark Elf Has the Heart of a Middle-Aged Man! began serialization on Kadokawa Corporation's Kakuyomu website on January 8, 2022. It was later acquired by Shufu to Seikatsu Sha who began publishing the series with illustrations by Naji Yanagida under their PASH! Books light novel imprint on June 2, 2023. Four volumes have been released as of March 6, 2026.

In December 2024, Cross Infinite World announced that they had licensed the series for English publication.

No.	Original release date	Original ISBN	North American release date	North American ISBN
1	June 2, 2023	978-4-391-15967-7	August 10, 2025	979-8-88560-164-1
1. "I'm a Middle-Aged Man on the Inside"; 2. "The First Town"; 3. "The Adventurer's Guild"; 4. Interlude: "A Man Named Haruka Yamagishi"; 5. "Hunting"; 6. "Expedition"; 7. "Dissidence"; Side story: "Montana's Short Journey"; Side story: "How I Spend My Days Off"
2	April 5, 2024	978-4-391-16207-3	—	—
3	August 1, 2025	978-4-391-16606-4	—	—
4	March 6, 2026	978-4-391-16719-1	—	—

=== Manga ===
A manga adaptation illustrated by Utsugi began serialization on Shufu to Seikatsu Sha's Comic PASH! website on April 26, 2024. The manga's chapters have been compiled into five tankōbon volumes as of September 2026.

During their panel at Anime NYC 2025, J-Novel Club announced that they had licensed the manga for English publication.

No.	Original release date	Original ISBN	North American release date	North American ISBN
1	October 4, 2024	978-4-391-16364-3	November 26, 2025	978-1-7183-7842-1
Chapters 1–7; Extra
2	March 7, 2025	978-4-391-16470-1	March 18, 2026	978-1-7183-7843-8
Chapters 8–13; Extra
3	November 7, 2025	978-4-391-16682-8	July 8, 2026	978-1-7183-7844-5
Chapters 14–20; Extra
4	March 6, 2026	978-4-391-16742-9	January 6, 2027	978-1-7183-7845-2
5	September 4, 2026	978-4-391-16894-5	—	—

== Reception ==
The series won the 2024 Next Light Novel Award in the tankōbon category.

== See also ==
- Reincarnated as a Dragon Hatchling, another light novel series illustrated by Naji Yanagida
