= Wehrwolf =

Wehrwolf may refer to:

- Der Wehrwolf, a novel by Hermann Löns, published in 1910
- Der Werwolf: The Annals of Veight, a Japanese light novel series
- Werwolf, a Nazi plan, to create a resistance forces behind enemy lines
- Werwolf (Wehrmacht headquarters), one of Adolf Hitler's military headquarters, located in Ukraine
- An archaic spelling of werewolf, a human with the ability to shapeshift into a wolf
