= List of How a Realist Hero Rebuilt the Kingdom volumes =

How a Realist Hero Rebuilt the Kingdom is a Japanese light novel series written by Dojyomaru and illustrated by Fuyuyuki. The series originally started as a web novel in 2014 on Shōsetsuka ni Narō, but it was subsequently deleted and resumed on Pixiv. The series was later acquired by Overlap, who published twenty volumes of it as a light novel under their Overlap Bunko from May 25, 2016, to December 25, 2024. Digital English light novel publisher J-Novel Club announced their acquisition of the series on February 23, 2017. The print version is published by Seven Seas Entertainment.

A manga adaptation of the series by Satoshi Ueda began serialization on Overlap's Comic Gardo website on July 10, 2017. The series is also licensed in North America by J-Novel Club. As of June 2026, fifteen tankōbon volumes have been released.

== Light novels ==
| No. | Original release date | Original ISBN | English release date | English ISBN |
|---|---|---|---|---|
| 1 | May 25, 2016 | 978-4-86554-111-3 | February 23, 2017 (digital); September 11, 2018 (print) | 978-1-626929-07-4 |
Prologue; Chapter 1: Fundraising; Chapter 2: Start From X; Chapter 3: Let's Create a Broadcast Program; Intermission 1: Serina and the Death Spirit Panic; Chapter 4: A Day Off in Parnam; Intermission 2: The Sighs of Duchess Excel Walter; Chapter 5: The Legendary Old Man; Chapter 6: Relief; Epilogue; Extra Story: The Story of a Certain Group of Adventurers
| 2 | September 25, 2016 | 978-4-86554-148-9 | May 12, 2017 (digital); January 22, 2019 (print) | 978-1-626929-81-4 |
Prologue; Chapter 1: A Sign; Chapter 2: The Casts of Two Nations; Chapter 3: Ultimatum; Extra Story: The Story of a Certain Group of Adventurers 2; Chapter 4: The Lord of Altomura; Chapter 5: The Battle Outside Randel; Chapter 6: The Scheming Battle for Red Dragon City; Chapter 7: Sacrifice the Plum Tree to Preserve the Peach Tree; Chapter 8: Declaration of War; Chapter 9: The Final Battle; Epilogue: The True Raising of the Curtain; Prologue to the Post-war Period
| 3 | February 25, 2017 | 978-4-86554-191-5 | August 3, 2017 (digital); May 28, 2019 (print) | 978-1-642750-44-7 |
Prologue: On a Moonlit Terrace; Chapter 1: Project Lorelei; Intermission 1: Lord Ishizuka; Chapter 2: Meeting on a Street Corner in Van; Chapter 3: Negotiations; Chapter 4: Pact; Chapter 5: Withdrawal; Extra Story: The Story of a Certain Group of Adventurers 3; Chapter 6: Standing in Front of the Lion's Cage; Chapter 7: Promise; Chapter 8: Crime and Punishment; Epilogue: Peace is Yet Distant
| 4 | March 15, 2017 | 978-4-86554-226-4 | October 19, 2017 (digital); September 17, 2019 (print) | 978-1-642750-45-4 |
Prologue: The Running King; Chapter 1: Preparing for Innovation; Chapter 2: A Story of Using Shrimp as Bait to Catch Sea Bream, but Instead Catching a Shark; Chapter 3: An Unusual Slave Trader; Chapter 4: The Museum in the Royal Capital; Chapter 5: Weighing Nostalgia Against the Future; Final Chapter: In the Snow; Bonus Story: The Beginning of 1547, Continental Calendar
| 5 | October 25, 2017 | 978-4-86554-272-1 | February 1, 2018 (digital); December 10, 2019 (print) | 978-1-642757-37-8 |
Prologue: The Beginning of the Enlightenment; Chapter 1: Let's Make an Educational Program (Silvan's Debut); Intermission 1: The Black Robed One and the Little Sister General, Now Negotiating; Chapter 2: The Kingdom's Secret Weapon; Intermission 2: Researching a Certain Line of Research; Chapter 3: The Fiancees' Bridal Course; Chapter 3.5: After the Bridal Course (Souma's Day); Intermission 3: Chance Encounter in the North; Chapter 4: The Saint Comes; Chapter 5: The Commandment-breaking Bishop, Souji Lester; Epilogue: Towards the First Trip Abroad
| 6 | February 27, 2018 | 978-4-86554-314-8 | June 1, 2018 (digital); April 14, 2020 (print) | 978-1-645052-29-6 |
Prologue: Naden Delal; Chapter 1: What You Get out of Louts and Scissors Depends on How You Use Them; Chapter 2: Time Begins to Move; Chapter 3: The Narrowing Distance Between the Two; Chapter 4: The Naden That Naden Never Knew; Chapter 5: Even if this Love was Prearranged; Chapter 6: The Plains of Grief; Chapter 7: The Storm; Epilogue 1: A Dance With You; Side Story 1: The Ambassador's Return; Side Story 2: Nameless Heroes; Side Story 3: Genia and Merula's "Let's Test it!"; Epilogue 2: On To Yet Another Country
| 7 | June 25, 2018 | 978-4-86554-363-6 | September 22, 2018 (digital); September 22, 2020 (print) | 978-1-64505-512-9 |
Prologue: Meeting Up; Chapter 1: From the New City, Venetinova; Chapter 2: Urgent News and a Meeting; Chapter 3: A Great Man Still in the Making; Chapter 4: To Know a Person; Chapter 5: Fighting Together; Chapter 6: A Trump Card in Negotiations; Chapter 7: Tripartite Medical Alliance; Epilogue: An Unsettling Presence; After Returning to the Country Arc – 1: The Weather Girl; After Returning to the Country Arc – 2: Kuu's Stay in the Kingdom; After Returning to the Country Arc – 3: The Flower that Blooms in the Field and the Bird in the Cage; After Returning to the Country Arc – 4: The God-protected Forest's Longest Day; After Returning to the Country Arc – 5: Memorial Festival
| 8 | October 25, 2018 | 978-4-86554-405-3 | February 15, 2019 (digital); October 20, 2020 (print) | 978-1-64505-749-9 |
Prologue: The Hawks and Wolves of the Northern Plains; Chapter 1: The Road to the North; Chapter 2: For the Future; Chapter 3: Assignment of Personnel; Chapter 4: Defending the Walls of Lasta Castle; Chapter 5: Reunion with an Old Foe; Chapter 6: The Reality Here and Now; Chapter 7: Cooked and Ready to Serve; Chapter 8: The Liberation of Lasta; Chapter 9: Help Arrives; Chapter 10: Everyone's Night Before the Final Battle; Chapter 11: The Dabicon is Burning; Chapter 12: The Victory Banquet; The Friedonian Military, Eastward
| 9 | February 25, 2019 | 978-4-86554-451-0 | July 20, 2019 (digital); December 22, 2020 (print) | 978-1-64505-791-8 |
Prologue: Tora and Tiger; Chapter 1: Meeting in the Sky; Chapter 2: The Fuuga that Halbert Saw; Chapter 3: A Little Adventure and a Meeting; Chapter 4: Finale; Chapter 5: Idioms Change in Meaning; Chapter 6: A Troublesome Present; Chapter 7: The State of Various Countries; Epilogue 1: Family; Cast of Characters Arc 1: Children and Their Guardians; Cast of Characters Arc 2: Genia and Merula, Unveiling the Deepening Mysteries; Cast of Characters Arc 3: The Drill Princess of the Empire; Cast of Characters Arc 4: The Young Master's Awakening, the Girls' Determination; Cast of Characters Arc 5: The Shining Dragon; Epilogue 2: Welcome Home
| 10 | June 25, 2019 | 978-4-86554-511-1 | October 19, 2019 (digital); February 16, 2021 (print) | 978-1-64505-951-6 |
Prologue: The Countdown to Marriage; Chapter 1: The Red Oni is Blue; Chapter 2: Ginger Wipes it All Away; Chapter 3: Falling; Chapter 4: Heart Piercing; Chapter 5: The Black Tiger's Delivery; Chapter 6: A Wedding Present that was Worth a Fortune; Chapter 7: Time to Face One Another; Chapter 8: Before the Ceremony; Final Chapter: The Wedding Ceremony; Bonus Story: The Happiest Queen of All
| 11 | October 24, 2019 | 978-4-86554-561-6 | April 26, 2020 (digital); April 6, 2021 (print) | 978-1-64827-085-7 |
Prologue: The Night Before New Days; Chapter 1: Let's Go To School; Chapter 2: The East and West Real Song Battle; Chapter 2.5: An Unexpected Evolution and Possibility; Chapter 3: Symposium; Chapter 4: Exchange of Opinions; Chapter 5: March of the Bon Parade; Epilogue: Intentions
| 12 | April 25, 2020 | 978-4-86554-646-0 | August 22, 2020 (digital); September 7, 2021 (print) | 978-1-64827-259-2 |
Chapter 1: The Lion's Daughter; Chapter 2: Invitation; Chapter 3: Mercenary State Zem; Chapter 4: Mio; Chapter 5: The Great Martial Arts Tournament; Chapter 6: Crossing Swords; Chapter 7: First Meeting; Chapter 8: Direct Conference; Chapter 9: Before a Loyal Retainer's Grave; Chapter End: The Quiet Island, and the Tranquil Kingdom; Intermission 1: The Lioness Seeks Her Prey; Intermission 2: Research Girls' Party (The Plan to Improve Mechadra); Prologue to the Next Chapter: Law of the Sea; Chapter 1: Uninvited Guests
| 13 | September 25, 2020 | 978-4-86554-740-5 | March 6, 2021 (digital); December 28, 2021 (print) | 978-1-64827-359-9 |
Prologue: Storm -enemy attack-; Chapter 1: Wrath -anger-; Chapter 2: Cause -unknown-; Chapter 3: Preparation -policy-; Chapter 4: Going Ahead -leading force-; Chapter 5: Encounter -enemy-; Chapter 6: Into Battle -fleet-; Chapter 7: Naval Battle -aircraft carrier-; Chapter 8: Meeting the Enemy -monster-; Chapter 9: Duel -total war-; Chapter 10: Mechanical Dragon -final battle-; Chapter 11: Big Pot -banquet-; Chapter 12: Negotiations -ocean league-; Epilogue: Return -I'm back-; Midword; After Story 1: Victorious Return -welcome back-; After Story 2: Waves -new chapter-
| 14 | April 25, 2021 | 978-4-86554-891-4 | October 25, 2021 (digital); May 10, 2022 (print) | 978-1-63858-145-1 |
Prologue: The Young Tiger Awakens; Chapter 1: The Wavering States; Chapter 2: Assassin and Ripples; Chapter 3: The Wavering Nations; Chapter 4: A Family Divided; Chapter 5: Battle of the Sebal Plains; Chapter 6: Turning Point of History; Chapter 7: Groundwork; Chapter 8: A Large Skirmish; Chapter 9: The Defectors Volunteer Their Services; Chapter 10: Those Who Were Reunited; Chapter 11: A Meeting and a Request; Chapter 12: The Lunarian Exodus; Chapter 13: Welcoming All Who Come, Chasing None Who Leave; Epilogue: The Great Tiger Kingdom of Haan
| 15 | June 25, 2021 | 978-4-86554-937-9 | January 17, 2022 (digital); December 20, 2022 (print) | 978-1-63858-364-6 |
Prologue: As One Country Rises; Chapter 1: The Kingdom's Baby Boom; Chapter 2: The Truth Overlapping Events Lead Us To; Chapter 3: Envoy; Chapter 4: The Battle of the Father Island; Chapter 5: The Spirit King's Curse; Chapter 6: For the Future We Must Protect; Chapter 7: In the Name of Mankind; Chapter 8: Investigation; Chapter 9: The Right Person for the Right Job; Chapter 10: The Balm Summit; Chapter 11: The End; Epilogue: His Name Is; Midword; After Story: One Summer Night
| 16 | December 25, 2021 | 978-4-82400-065-1 | June 7, 2022 (digital); May 23, 2023 (print) | 978-1-63858-763-7 |
Prologue: Two Years After; Chapter 1: A Wedding and a Family Vacation; Chapter 2: Ambitions Resumed; Chapter 3: The Shaking Empire; Chapter 4: Flowers Working Behind the Scenes; Chapter 5: Crossed and Conflicting Intentions; Chapter 6: Collision; Chapter 7: Falling Flowers, Flowing Water; Chapter 8: The Maritime Alliance Gets Serious; Chapter 9: The Fruit of Two Years; Chapter 10: Shedding Tears; Chapter 11: Sisters; Chapter 12: Resolution; Epilogue: That is Her Way of Life
| 17 | April 25, 2022 | 978-4-82400-162-7 | November 7, 2022 (digital); November 28, 2023 (print) | 979-8-88843-062-0 |
Prologue: Genius Go Home; Chapter 1: Special Products Are What You Make of Them; Chapter 2: The Wise Wolf Princess: Love Is War; Chapter 3: The Women of Each Country; Chapter 4: During the Gaudy Banquet; Chapter 5: Invitation to the North; Chapter 6: Investigation; Chapter 7: Unsettling Signs; Chapter 8: Encounter Battle; Chapter 9: The Demon Lord's True Identity; Chapter 10: How This World Came to Be; Chapter 11: Reunited in Haalga; Chapter 12: Blood Kin; Epilogue: Before the Inevitable Conflict; Extra Story: The Prickly Girl Wants to Be Spoiled
| 18 | June 25, 2023 | 978-4-82-400528-1 | November 29, 2023 (digital); April 30, 2024 (print) | 979-8-88843-431-4 |
Prologue: Old Man, the Ultimate Weapon; Chapter 1: Petty Trickery Runs in the Family; Chapter 2: New Years in Both Camps; Chapter 3: The Paths of Brother and Sister; Chapter 4: Towards World War; Chapter 5: Intense in the South, Quiet in the West; Chapter 6: From Whom Do You Fight?; Chapter 7: Even If We Part; Chapter 8: Illusions on the Kingdom Front; Chapter 9: A Heated Battle! The Red Dragon City Front; Chapter 10: Shared Pain; Chapter 11: The Moment the Era Changed; Epilogue: Yuriga's Battle
| 19 | February 25, 2024 | 978-4-82-400738-4 | March 24, 2025 (digital); September 21, 2025 (print) | 979-8-89160-635-7 |
Prologue: The Great Fuuga's Final Battle; Chapter 1: The Warriors' Competition; Chapter 2: The Pride of the Brilliant Commanders; Chapter 3: Racing Through the Era; Chapter 4: Elegy for a Great Man; Chapter 5: Checkmate; Chapter 6: Conclusion; Chapter 6.5: The Say Souma's Got a Fever; Chapter 7: Memorial; Chapter 8: The Great Man Leaves the Stage; Chapter 9: Bad News; Chapter 11: The Curtain Closes on an Era; Epilogue; Side Story 1: It Comes Around Again Just When You Forgot About It; Side Story 2: The Little Musashibo Power-Up Plan
| 20 | December 25, 2024 | 978-4-82-401025-4 | December 29, 2025 (digital); September 1, 2026 (print) | 979-8-89373-312-9 |
Prologue: Proposal; Chapter 1: Souma's Secret Child?; Chapter 2: The "Gorilla" Opens for Business +α1; Chapter 3: The Royal Couple of Remus's Stay in the (Former) Capital of the Principality; Chapter 4: Happy Wedding Planner; Chapter 5: Merula Returns to Her Home Country; Chapter 6: How the Formerly Cold-Blooded Prince Rebuilt the Kingdom; Chapter 7: Lively Days in the Euphoria Kingdom; Chapter 8: And on the Eighth Day; Chapter 9: Masked Couple; Chapter 10: Souma Goes to Yumuen; Epilogue: Parnam Castle Is Always Lively
| SS | December 25, 2024 | 978-4-8240-1026-1 | June 4, 2026 (digital) | 978-1-71830-940-1 |
Side Story 1: The Realist Hero's Second Youngest; Chapter 1: 1546th Year, Continental Calendar; Side Story 2: Luka the Mosiscon; Chapter 2: End of the 1546th Year, Continental Calendar – 1547th Year, Continental Calendar; Chapter 3: End of the 1547th Year, Continental Calendar ~ Middle of 1548th Year, Continental Calendar; Side Story 3: The Blessing of the Merciful Mother and Its True Value; Chapter 4: 1548th Year, Continental Calendar; Chapter 5: 1549th Year, Continental Calendar; Side Story 4: Intervention, A Mysterious Girl; Chapter 6: 1550th Year, Continental Calendar; Chapter 7: 1552~1553, Continental Calendar; Chapter 8: 1554th Year, Continental Calendar Onward; Final Side Story: And the Days Go On

== Manga ==
| No. | Original release date | Original ISBN | English release date | English ISBN |
|---|---|---|---|---|
| 1 | February 25, 2018 | 978-4-86554-321-6 | June 11, 2019 (digital); February 2, 2021 (print) | 978-1-718341-01-2 |
Chapter 1: Prologue; Chapter 2: Fundraising; Chapter 3: Souma's Search for Personnel (1); Chapter 4: Souma's Search for Personnel (2); Chapter 5: Souma's Search for Personnel (3); Chapter 6: Let's Create a Broadcast Program; Original Short Story: "Episode 0"
| 2 | August 25, 2018 | 978-4-86554-391-9 | October 30, 2019 (digital); February 2, 2021 (print) | 978-1-718341-01-2 |
Chapter 7: A Day Off in Parnam (1); Chapter 8: A Day Off in Parnam (2); Chapter 9: The Legendary Old Man; Chapter 10: Relief; Chapter 11: On Your Side; Original Short Story: The Setting Sun in Parnam
| 3 | February 25, 2019 | 978-4-86554-458-9 | January 29, 2020 (digital); June 1, 2021 (print) | 978-1-718341-03-6 |
Chapter 12: A Sign; Chapter 13: The Casts of Two Nations; Chapter 14: Ultimatum; Chapter 15: The Story of a Certain Group of Adventurers; Chapter 16: The Lord of Altomura; Original Short Story: The Place Where You Shine
| 4 | October 25, 2019 | 978-4-86554-564-7 | July 1, 2020 (digital); June 1, 2021 (print) | 978-1-718341-03-6 |
Chapter 17: The Battle Near Randel; Chapter 18: The Scheming Battle for Red Dragon City (1); Chapter 19: The Scheming Battle for Red Dragon City (2); Chapter 20: Sacrifice the Plum Tree to Preserve the Peach Tree; Chapter 21: Declaration of War (1); Original Short Story: They Want to Soothe Him
| 5 | April 25, 2020 | 978-4-86554-655-2 | October 14, 2020 (digital); January 11, 2022 (print) | 978-1-718341-08-1 |
Chapter 22: Declaration of War (2); Chapter 23: The Final Battle (1); Chapter 24: The Final Battle (2); Chapter 25: The Final Battle (3); Chapter 26: The Final Battle (4); Original Short Story: A Story From the Battlefield
| 6 | November 25, 2020 | 978-4-86554-794-8 | July 7, 2021 (digital); January 11, 2022 (print) | 978-1-718341-10-4 |
Chapter 27: The Final Battle (5); Chapter 28: Prologue to the Post-war Period; Chapter 29: Project Lorelei (1); Chapter 30: Project Lorelei (2); Chapter 31: Meeting on a Street Corner in a Van (1); Original Short Story: Which of Them is Really on Top?
| 7 | June 25, 2021 | 978-4-86554-950-8 | January 5, 2022 (digital); December 13, 2022 (print) | 978-1-718341-12-8 |
Chapter 32: Meeting on a Street Corner in Van (2); Chapter 33: Negotiations; Chapter 34: Pact (1); Chapter 35: Pact (2); Chapter 36: Withdrawal (1); Chapter 37: Withdrawal (2); Original Short Story: Those Who Get Jerked Around
| 8 | December 25, 2021 | 978-4-82400-075-0 | June 15, 2022 (digital); December 13, 2022 (print) | 978-1-718341-14-2 |
Chapter 38: In Front of the Lion's Cage; Chapter 39: Promise; Chapter 40: Crime and Punishment (1); Chapter 41: Crime and Punishment (2); Chapter 42: Preparing for Innovation (1); Original Short Story: The Secret of That Thing's Creation
| 9 | August 25, 2022 | 978-4-82400-283-9 | March 13, 2023 (digital); October 8, 2024 (print) | 978-1-718341-16-6 |
Chapter 43: Preparing for Innovation (2); Chapter 44: A Story of Using Shrimp as Bait to Catch Sea Bream, but Instead Catching a Shark (1); Chapter 45: A Story of Using Shrimp as Bait to Catch Sea Bream, but Instead Catching a Shark (2); Chapter 46: An Unusual Slave Trader (1); Chapter 47: An Unusual Slave Trader (2); Original Short Story: The Little Tanuki Princess's Direction Plan
| 10 | April 25, 2023 | 978-4-82400-481-9 | December 13, 2023 (digital); October 8, 2024 (print) | 978-1-718341-17-3 |
Chapter 48: Weighing Nostalgia Against the Future; Chapter 49: Weighing Nostalgia Against the Future (2); Chapter 50: Weighing Nostalgia Against the Future (3); Chapter 51: In the Snow (1); Chapter 52: In the Snow (2); Original Short Story: Thus Spoke Liscia (On the Subject of That Time)
| 11 | December 25, 2023 | 978-4-82400-697-4 | January 15, 2025 (digital); February 10, 2026 (print) | 978-1-718341-18-0 |
Chapter 53: Let's Start an Educational Program; Chapter 54: The Kingdom's Secret Weapon (1); Chapter 55: The Kingdom's Secret Weapon (2); Chapter 56: Researching a Certain Line of Research; Chapter 57: Researching a Certain Risqué Subject; Original Short Story: Bridal Course – Supplemental Material
| 12 | July 25, 2024 | 978-4-82400-902-9 | May 7, 2025 (digital); February 10, 2026 (print) | 978-1-718341-19-7 |
Chapter 58: Chance Encounter in the North; Chapter 59: The Saint Comes (1); Chapter 60: The Saint Comes (2); Chapter 61: The Commandment-Breaking Bishop, Souji Lester (1); Chapter 62: The Commandment-Breaking Bishop, Souji Lester (2); Original Short Story: Makeup for a Wild High Elf
| 13 | March 25, 2025 | 978-4-82401-134-3 | January 14, 2026 (digital) | 978-1-718341-20-3 |
| 14 | November 25, 2025 | 978-4-82401-425-2 | — | — |
| 15 | June 20, 2026 | 978-4-8240-1704-8 | — | — |
