= Zilbagias the Demon Prince: How the Seventh Prince Brought Down the Kingdom =

Japanese light novel series

- First light novel volume cover

第七魔王子ジルバギアスの魔王傾国記 (Dainana Maōji Jirubagiasu no Maō Keikokuki)
- Genre: Dark fantasy
- Novel series
- Written by: Tomoaki Amagi
- Published by: Kakuyomu
- Original run: March 31, 2021 – present
- Light novel
- Written by: Tomoaki Amagi
- Illustrated by: Tsukasa Kiryu
- Published by: Overlap
- English publisher: NA: J-Novel Club
- Imprint: Overlap Bunko
- Original run: July 25, 2022 – present
- Volumes: 6
- Manga
- Written by: Tomoaki Amagi
- Illustrated by: Nitora Noi
- Published by: Overlap
- Imprint: Gardo Comics
- Magazine: Comic Gardo
- Original run: March 7, 2023 – September 19, 2025
- Volumes: 4

Zilbagias the Demon Prince: How the Seventh Prince Brought Down the Kingdom (第七魔王子ジルバギアスの魔王傾国記, Dainana Maōji Jirubagiasu no Maō Keikokuki) is a Japanese light novel series written by Tomoaki Amagi and illustrated by Tsukasa Kiryu. It began serialization on Kadokawa Corporation's Kakuyomu website in March 2021. It was later acquired by Overlap who began publishing it under their Overlap Bunko imprint in July 2022. A manga adaptation illustrated by Nitora Noi was serialized on Overlap's Comic Gardo website between March 2023 and September 2025.

== Synopsis ==
The hero Alexander went on a raid with his party to finally defeat the Demon King and end the war. However, the raid ended in failure as the Demon King utterly destroys his party. Two years later, Alexander wakes up and finds out that he has been reincarnated as the Demon King's son Zilbagias. With his memories intact, he vows revenge on the Demon King by destroying the kingdom from the inside.

== Media ==
=== Light novel ===
Written by Tomoaki Amagi, Zilbagias the Demon Prince: How the Seventh Prince Brought Down the Kingdom began serialization on Kadokawa Corporation's Kakuyomu website on March 31, 2021. It was later acquired by Overlap who began publishing the series with illustrations by Tsukasa Kiryu under its Overlap Bunko light novel imprint on July 25, 2022. Six volumes have been released as of May 25, 2025. The series is licensed in English by J-Novel Club.

No.	Original release date	Original ISBN	North American release date	North American ISBN
1	July 25, 2022	978-4-8240-0234-1	April 26, 2024	978-1-7183-3342-0
1. Prologue; 2. Chapter 1: "Prince of the Demons"; 3. Chapter 2: "The Devil's Pact"; 4. Chapter 3: "Denizens of the Dark"; 5. Chapter 4: "The Elven Saint"; 6. Epilogue; Side story: "The Saint and Baked Sweets"
2	January 25, 2023	978-4-8240-0389-8	August 9, 2024	978-1-7183-3344-4
1. Prologue; 2. Chapter 1: "Those Hidden in the Dark"; 3. Chapter 2: "Reviled Child of the Dragon"; 4. Chapter 3: "That Childhood Friend"; 5. Chapter 4: "The Proud Dragons"; 6. Epilogue; Side story: "The Archduchess's Nightmare"
3	June 25, 2023	978-4-8240-0525-0	November 22, 2024	978-1-7183-3346-8
1. Prologue; 2. Chapter 1: "The Demon Prince's Homecoming"; 3. Chapter 2: "Home of the Rage Family"; 4. Chapter 3: "Training Days"; 5. Chapter 4: "The Hero's Story"; 6. Epilogue
4	January 25, 2024	978-4-8240-0710-0	March 7, 2025	978-1-7183-3348-2
1. Prologue; 2. Chapter 1: "The Nostalgic Castle"; 3. Chapter 2: "Family Bonding"; 4. Chapter 3: "The Time for Blasphemy"; 5. Chapter 4: "The Demon Prince Deployed"; 6. Epilogue
5	September 25, 2024	978-4-8240-0917-3	November 13, 2025	978-1-7183-3350-5
1. Prologue; 2. Chapter 1: "Hell's Cauldron"; 3. Chapter 2: "Reflections on Death"; 4. Chapter 3: "The Prince's Accomplishments"; 5. Chapter 4: "The Triumphant Demon Prince's Return"; 6. Epilogue
6	May 25, 2025	978-4-8240-1116-9	April 16, 2026	978-1-7183-3352-9
1. Prologue; 2. Chapter 1: "The Days of the Demon Prince"; 3. Chapter 2: "The Beginning of the Autonomous Zone"; 4. Chapter 3: "Artifice and Unnecessary Trouble"; 5. Chapter 4: "His True Wish"; 6. Epilogue

=== Manga ===
A manga adaptation illustrated by Nitora Noi was serialized on Overlap's Comic Gardo website from March 7, 2023, to September 19, 2025. The manga's chapters were collected in four tankōbon volumes released from June 25, 2023, to August 25, 2025.

No.	Release date	ISBN
1	June 25, 2023	978-4-8240-0532-8
2	January 25, 2024	978-4-8240-0718-6
3	August 25, 2024	978-4-8240-0931-9
4	August 25, 2025	978-4-8240-1229-6

== Reception ==
The series was ranked fourth in the bunkobon category in the 2022 Next Light Novel Awards.
