= Sometimes Even Reality Is a Lie! =

Japanese manga series

- First tankōbon volume cover

現実(リアル)もたまには嘘をつく (Riaru mo Tama ni wa Uso o Tsuku)
- Genre: Romantic comedy
- Manga
- Written by: Niichi
- Published by: Chukei Publishing
- English publisher: NA: J-Novel Club
- Imprint: Kitora
- Original run: August 6, 2018 – present
- Volumes: 9
- Anime television series
- Original run: 2027 – scheduled
- icon

Sometimes Even Reality Is a Lie! (Japanese: 現実(リアル)もたまには嘘をつく, Hepburn: Riaru mo Tama ni wa Uso o Tsuku; lit. 'Sometimes Reality Lies') is a Japanese manga series written and illustrated by Niichi. It has been serialized on Niichi's Twitter account since August 2018. Chukei Publishing (under Kadokawa) has compiled its chapters into nine volumes under their Kitora comic label from July 2020 to September 2026. An anime television series adaptation is set to premiere in 2027.

== Plot ==
The series follows Kaoru Terazaki, a video gamer who befriends another gamer named Nanami. He is excited to meet up with Nanami in real-life, but feels conscious as he plays as a female character in the game, going as far as to practice an apology for not meeting Nanami's expectations. During their first meet-up, he discovers that Nanami is actually a woman named Nanami Osaka. Nanami wants to introduce Kaoru to her parents, except her parents are overprotective of her and do not want to see her with men. To solve this, Kaoru decides to cross-dress as a girl during the visit.

== Characters ==
Kaoru Terazaki (寺崎 薫, Terazaki Kaoru)
Voiced by: Shun Horie (voice comic)
A 16-year-old high school student. He is a fan of MMORPGs and plays with a female character online. He usually lives alone at home as his mother died when he was young and his father is often overseas for work. Because of Nanami's parents' overprotectiveness, he crossdresses as a girl when he goes out with Nanami.
Nanami Ōsaka (逢坂 七海, Ōsaka Nanami)
Voiced by: Nanami Yamashita (voice comic)
A 17-year-old gamer who befriends Kaoru. Because she plays as a male character and goes by the name Nami online, Kaoru initially thought she was a man, only to find out her true identity after they first met in real life. She lives a recluse life due to various circumstances and does not go to school, but upon Kaoru's encouragement, she later transfers to his school.
Toshio Ōsaka (逢坂 俊雄, Ōsaka Toshio)
Nanami's father, who is skilled in martial arts such as judo and kendo. He is highly overprotective of Nanami, to the point that he does not want her to have any male friends.
Shōko Ōsaka (逢坂 祥子, Ōsaka Shōko)
Nanami's mother and a housewife.

== Development ==
Niichi originally created Sometimes Even Reality Is a Lie! after being unable to finish a doujin work that he was working on, with it being intended as a replacement work for an event he was attending. Originally, it was only intended to be a one-off story, but the work's positive reception led to it being fleshed out as a full series. Although stories where people who first meet online then meet in real-life, only to find out that they are of the opposite sex, are common, Niichi wanted to put his own twist on the theme by including crossdressing elements. As he originally only did the series during his free time as he had a full-time job, he did not imagine that the series would get a full serialization. The series' video game themes were inspired by his own love for video games. In contrast to other romantic comedy works where the parents play a supporting role, he also wanted Nanami's parents to play a more active role, their characters developing along with Nanami herself.

== Media ==
=== Manga ===
Niichi began posting the series on his Twitter account on August 6, 2018, with chapters also being posted to his Pixiv account. Chukei Publishing (under Kadokawa) collected its chapters into nine tankōbon volumes under their Kitora comic label from July 31, 2020, to September 16, 2026. In June 2024, Niichi revealed that the series was coming to an end soon. The series is licensed in English by J-Novel Club.

No.	Original release date	Original ISBN	English release date	English ISBN
1	July 31, 2020	978-4-04-604812-7	June 22, 2022	978-1-71-831363-7
2	April 21, 2021	978-4-04-605135-6	September 1, 2022	978-1-71-831364-4
3	June 15, 2022	978-4-04-605852-2	June 21, 2023	978-1-71-831365-1
4	June 28, 2023	978-4-04-606433-2	June 26, 2024	978-1-71-831366-8
5	June 24, 2024	978-4-04-606922-1	June 11, 2025	978-1-71-831367-5
6	December 24, 2024	978-4-04-607343-3	November 19, 2025	978-1-71-831368-2
7	August 6, 2025	978-4-04-607634-2	May 27, 2026	978-1-71-831369-9
8	February 27, 2026	978-4-04-607981-7	—	—
9	September 16, 2026	978-4-04-330201-7	—	—

=== Anime ===
An anime television series adaptation was announced on July 19, 2026. It is set to premiere in 2027.

=== Other ===
Kadokawa uploaded voiced comic videos of the series on YouTube in 2021, featuring the voices of Shun Horie as Kaoru and Nanami Yamashita as Nanami.
