= Campfire Cooking in Another World with My Absurd Skill =

Japanese light novel series and its adaptations

- First light novel volume cover

とんでもスキルで異世界放浪メシ (Tondemo Sukiru de Isekai Hōrō Meshi)
- Genre: Cooking; Fantasy comedy; Isekai
- Novel series
- Written by: Ren Eguchi
- Published by: Shōsetsuka ni Narō
- Original run: January 5, 2016 – present
- Light novel
- Written by: Ren Eguchi
- Illustrated by: Masa
- Published by: Overlap
- English publisher: NA: J-Novel Club Yen Press (print)
- Imprint: Overlap Novels
- Original run: November 25, 2016 – present
- Volumes: 17 + 1 short story collection
- Manga
- Written by: Ren Eguchi
- Illustrated by: Akagishi K
- Published by: Overlap
- English publisher: NA: J-Novel Club Yen Press (print)
- Magazine: Comic Gardo
- Original run: March 24, 2017 – present
- Volumes: 11
- Manga

Campfire Cooking in Another World with My Absurd Skill: Sui's Great Adventure
- Written by: Ren Eguchi
- Illustrated by: Momo Futaba
- Published by: Overlap
- English publisher: NA: J-Novel Club
- Magazine: Comic Gardo
- Original run: August 24, 2018 – present
- Volumes: 8
- Anime television series
- Directed by: Kiyoshi Matsuda
- Written by: Michiko Yokote
- Music by: Masato Kōda; Kana Utatane; Kuricorder Quartet
- Studio: MAPPA
- Licensed by: Crunchyroll (streaming); SA/SEA: Muse Communication
- Original network: TXN (TV Tokyo), AT-X
- English network: SEA: Animax Asia
- Original run: January 11, 2023 – December 24, 2025
- Episodes: 24
- icon

Campfire Cooking in Another World with My Absurd Skill (Japanese: とんでもスキルで異世界放浪メシ, Hepburn: Tondemo Sukiru de Isekai Hōrō Meshi) is a Japanese light novel series written by Ren Eguchi. The series originated on the Shōsetsuka ni Narō website in January 2016, before being published in print with illustrations by Masa by Overlap beginning in November 2016 under their Overlap Novels imprint. As of September 2025, 17 volumes have been released.

A manga adaptation, illustrated by Akagishi K, began serialization on the Comic Gardo website in March 2017. As of July 2025, the manga's individual chapters have been collected into eleven volumes. A spin-off manga, illustrated by Momo Futaba, began serialization on the same website in August 2018. As of February 2024, the spin-off's individual chapters have been collected in eight volumes. An anime television series adaptation produced by MAPPA aired from January to March 2023. A second season aired from October to December 2025.

== Plot ==
Three Japanese high school students are magically summoned to a parallel fantasy world by the Kingdom of Reijseger, who asks them for help in their war against the demon folk. The students are found to possess several powerful magical abilities and are accepted as "Heroes". However, the hero summoning ritual also accidentally transported a fourth person, an ordinary salaryman named Tsuyoshi Mukouda (a.k.a. "Mukohda"), who has only one power: "Online Supermarket". Unwilling to become a Hero and harboring deep suspicion of the kingdom's true intentions, he convinces the nobles that his ability is useless, allowing him to leave and pursue a simple life in the new world. Experimenting with his Online Supermarket skill, he discovers he can instantly order food and other products from modern-day Japan. During his travels, he meets a legendary beast known as "Fenrir", who demands that Mukohda feed him. The Fenrir, eventually named Fel, takes a liking to Mukohda's cooking and forces him to accept a familiar contract. As Mukohda continues his journey, he gains more familiars, encounters other monsters, and befriends gods from the Divine Realm, who grant him and his familiars blessings to obtain his food and otherworldly goods.

== Characters ==
=== Main characters ===
Tsuyoshi Mukouda (向田剛志, Mukōda Tsuyoshi) / Mukohda (ムコーダ, Mukōda)
Voiced by: Yoshimasa Hosoya (drama CD), Yuma Uchida (anime) (Japanese); Aaron Campbell (English)
The main protagonist of the series. He is a mild-mannered but cowardly 27-year-old salaryman and former part-time cook who is accidentally transported to another world during a hero summoning ritual. Tsuyoshi presents himself as "Mukohda" in the new world after learning full names are used exclusively by nobility. He has the unique ability "Online Supermarket", which allows him to purchase items from modern Japan. He is able to provide temporary stat buffs by cooking meals with ingredients bought through his skill. He gains notoriety as a beast tamer through his powerful familiar contracts.
Fel (フェル, Feru)
Voiced by: Tomokazu Sugita (drama CD), Satoshi Hino (anime) (Japanese); Jonah Scott (English)
A Fenrir and Mukohda's first familiar. He is a legendary wolf-like creature who has lived for over a thousand years. He has extraordinary strength, agility, and magic that enables him to wipe out most monsters with little effort. Fel is prideful, selfish, vain, and gluttonous, choosing to follow Mukohda simply to eat his food. He loves meat and hates vegetables.
Sui (スイ)
Voiced by: Misaki Kuno (drama CD), Hina Kino (anime) (Japanese); Bryn Apprill (English)
A slime and Mukohda's second familiar. Initially met as a baby, Sui evolves throughout the series by gaining experience through battle and eating trash from Mukohda's Online Supermarket purchases. Though slimes are generally considered weak monsters, Sui is a special exception. It is able to melt enemies with acid bullets, as well as create potions and weapons. Sporting a child-like personality, it enjoys desserts and dislikes spicy foods. While its gender is unknown in the original novels, Sui is male in the manga (as well as the drama CD) and female in the anime. Sui is the main protagonist of the spin-off manga series Campfire Cooking in Another World with My Absurd Skill: Sui's Great Adventure.
Dora-chan (ドラちゃん)
Voiced by: Hiro Shimono (drama CD), Ayumu Murase (anime) (Japanese); Justin Briner (English)
A pixie dragon and Mukohda's third familiar. He is small but has a spunky, boastful attitude. He can fly at extreme speeds and holds a vast amount of magical power. Mukohda names him after the first half of the word "dragon" (ドラゴン, Doragon), and despite being an adult, is affixed with the honorific -chan due to his size and cuteness, much to Dora's chagrin. His favorite treat is Japanese-style custard caramel pudding.
Old Man Gon (ゴン爺, Gonjii)
An ancient dragon and Mukohda's fourth, and currently temporary, familiar. Having lived for several millennia, he is an old rival of Fel and one of few creatures capable of fighting him on equal terms. Gon is similar to Fel in voraciousness, arrogance, and stubbornness, causing the two to constantly butt heads. He is named after the second half of the word "dragon". He normally stands about twenty stories tall but can shrink at will.

=== Deities ===
Ninrir (ニンリル, Ninriru)
Voiced by: Ayane Sakura (drama CD), Maaya Uchida (anime) (Japanese); Macy Anne Johnson (English)
The Goddess of Wind, who has long silver hair and a huge sweet tooth. She is the first deity to grant Mukohda her blessing, giving him immunity to poisons, illnesses, and other negative status effects. Due to her constant demands for otherworldly sweets, primarily from Fujiya, and frequent emotional outbursts, Mukohda often refers to her as the "divine disappointment".
Agni (アグニ, Aguni)
Voiced by: Yō Taichi (anime) (Japanese); Michelle Rojas (English)
The Goddess of Fire, who has long red hair, dark skin, and a hotheaded temperament. She strengthens Mukohda's fire magic in exchange for otherworldly beer.
Kisharle (キシャール, Kishāru)
Voiced by: Yūko Kaida (anime) (Japanese); Morgan Garrett (English)
The Goddess of Earth, who has long blonde hair, a curvaceous figure, and a sisterly personality. She bolsters Mukohda's earth magic in exchange for otherworldly beauty products, namely from Matsumoto Kiyoshi.
Rusalka (ルサールカ, Rusāruka) / Ruka (ルカ, Ruka)
Voiced by: Saho Shirasu (anime) (Japanese); Jad Saxton (English)
The Goddess of Water, who has shorter blue hair, a young appearance, and a quiet demeanor. Due to Mukohda's lack of affinity for water magic, she grants Sui her blessing instead to receive offerings of otherworldly food. In the spin-off manga Sui's Great Adventure, she becomes attached to Sui and the two begin having long nighttime conversations together, with Sui eventually viewing Rusalka as an older sister.
Vahagn (ヴァハグン, Vahagun)
Voiced by: Kazuya Nakai
The God of War, who wears a skull helmet and is adorned with tattoos. In exchange for otherworldly booze, he provides Dora and Fel with his blessing, boosting their stats by 50% during battle.
Hephaestos (ヘファイストス, Hefaisutosu)
Voiced by: Shiro Saito
The God of Blacksmithing, who has a stocky build, large beard, and other dwarf-like features. In exchange for otherworldly booze, he gives Sui the ability to forge and upgrade weapons.
Demiurge (デミウルゴス, Demiurugosu)
The God of All Creation, the creator deity of the world Mukohda is summoned to. He eventually catches the other gods extorting Mukohda for his otherworldly goods, sentencing them to temporary house arrest. After Mukohda sends him sake as a gift, Demiurge bestows his blessing of longevity, raising Mukhoda's lifespan to 1,500 years.

=== Other characters ===
Elrand (エルランド, Erurando)
Voiced by: Daisuke Namikawa
The elven guildmaster for the Adventurer's Guild in the dungeon city of Dolan. He is a former adventurer, expert swordsman, and skilled monster butcher. He is infamous for his eccentric behavior and obsession with dragons. Elrand first meets Mukohda and his party after they seek his help in butchering a rare earth dragon for its meat.
Lambert (ランベルト, Ranberuto)
Voiced by: Motoi Koyanagi (anime)
A leather goods merchant from the city of Karelina whom Mukohda befriends after saving his caravan from a bandit attack. The two form a successful business partnership, alongside Lambert's wife Marie, selling soap and hair treatment products from Mukohda's world.
Willem (ヴィレム, Viremu)
Voiced by: Shinya Hamazoe (anime), Christopher Sabat (English)
The old, grizzled guildmaster for the Adventurer's Guild in Karelina, who comes to rely on Mukohda and his familiars with completing high-difficulty quests that others are unwilling to accept.

== Media ==
=== Light novel ===
Written by Ren Eguchi, the series began publication on the novel posting website Shōsetsuka ni Narō on January 5, 2016. The series was later acquired by Overlap, who began publishing the series with illustrations by Masa on November 25, 2016, under their Overlap Novels imprint. As of January 2026, 17 volumes and a short story collection have been released.

In March 2019, J-Novel Club announced that they licensed the light novel for English publication. In January 2025, J-Novel Club announced that a 2-in-1 omnibus print release would begin publication in August 2025.

==== Volumes ====
No.	Title	Original release date	English release date
1	Ginger-Fried Pork and the Legendary Beast 豚の生姜焼き×伝説の魔獣	November 25, 2016; 978-4-86-554167-0	May 6, 2019 (digital); August 12, 2025 (omnibus); 978-1-71-834300-9 (digital); 978-1-71-833250-8 (omnibus)
2	Winged Gyoza and the Phantom Dragon 羽根つき餃子×幻の竜	March 25, 2017; 978-4-86-554204-2	August 6, 2019 (digital); August 12, 2025 (omnibus); 978-1-71-834302-3 (digital); 978-1-71-833250-8 (omnibus)
3	Beef Stew and the Unexplored Labyrinth ビーフシチュー×未踏の迷宮	July 25, 2017; 978-4-86-554239-4	October 7, 2019 (digital); October 14, 2025 (omnibus); 978-1-71-834304-7 (digital); 978-1-71-833251-5 (omnibus)
4	Barbecue and God's Blessings バーベキュー×神々の祝福	December 25, 2017; 978-4-86-554296-7	December 24, 2019 (digital); October 14, 2025 (omnibus); 978-1-71-834306-1 (digital); 978-1-71-833251-5 (omnibus)
5	Mixed Tempura and the Sea Monster ミックスフライ×海洋の魔物	April 25, 2018; 978-4-86-554310-0	March 2, 2020 (digital); December 9, 2025 (omnibus); 978-1-71-834308-5 (digital); 978-1-71-833252-2 (omnibus)
6	Meat Soboro Rice Bowls and The Holy Seal 肉そぼろ丼×聖なる刻印	January 25, 2019; 978-4-86-554441-1	May 18, 2020 (digital); December 9, 2025 (omnibus); 978-1-71-834310-8 (digital); 978-1-71-833252-2 (omnibus)
7	Red Meat Steak and the Creator God's Judgement 赤身肉のステーキ×創造神の裁き	July 25, 2019; 978-4-86-554525-8	August 5, 2020 (digital); February 10, 2026 (omnibus); 978-1-71-834312-2 (digital); 978-1-71-833253-9 (omnibus)
8	Stone Over-Baked Pizza and the Elixir of Life 石窯焼きピザ×生命の神薬	January 25, 2020; 978-4-86-554597-5	October 19, 2020 (digital); February 10, 2026 (omnibus); 978-1-71-834314-6 (digital); 978-1-71-833253-9 (omnibus)
9	Grilled Entrails and the Festival of Gluttony ホルモン焼き×暴食の祭典	September 25, 2020; 978-4-86-554745-0	February 22, 2021 (digital); April 13, 2026 (omnibus); 978-1-71-834316-0 (digital); 978-1-71-833254-6 (omnibus)
10	Beef Cutlets and the Bandit King's Treasure ビーフカツ×盗賊王の宝	May 25, 2021; 978-4-86-554915-7	September 29, 2021 (digital); April 13, 2026 (omnibus); 978-1-71-834318-4 (digital); 978-1-71-833254-6 (omnibus)
11	Sukiyaki and the Blessings of Battle すき焼き×戦いの摂理	November 25, 2021; 978-4-82-400046-0	May 25, 2022 (digital); June 9, 2026 (omnibus); 978-1-71-834320-7 (digital); 978-1-71-833255-3 (omnibus)
12	Karaage and the Mighty Dragon of Yore 鶏のから揚げ×大いなる古竜	June 25, 2022; 978-4-82-400214-3	November 15, 2022 (digital); June 9, 2026 (omnibus); 978-1-71-834322-1 (digital); 978-1-71-833255-3 (omnibus)
13	Saucy Meatballs and the Ways of Adventuring 肉団子の甘酢あん×冒険者の流儀	December 25, 2022; 978-4-82-400366-9	June 26, 2023 (digital); October 13, 2026 (omnibus); 978-1-71-834324-5 (digital); 978-1-71-833256-0 (omnibus)
14	Cream Croquettes and the Downfall of Heresy クリームコロッケ×邪教の終焉	April 25, 2023; 978-4-82-400470-3	September 27, 2023 (digital); October 13, 2026 (omnibus); 978-1-71-834326-9 (digital); 978-1-71-833256-0 (omnibus)
15	Chilled Scallop Pasta and the Philosopher's Stone 貝柱の冷製パスタ×賢者の石	February 25, 2024; 978-4-8240-0634-9	September 4, 2024 (digital); April 13, 2027 (omnibus); 978-1-71-834328-3 (digital); 978-1-71-833257-7 (omnibus)
16	Whitefish Meunière and the Leviathan's Wake 白身魚のムニエル×海竜の葬送	December 25, 2024; 978-4-8240-1032-2	September 3, 2025 (digital); April 13, 2027 (omnibus); 978-1-71-834330-6 (digital); 978-1-71-833257-7 (omnibus)
17	Chaliapin Steak and the Remote Islanders シャリアピンステーキ×孤島に潜む者	September 25, 2025; 978-4-8240-1346-0	August 12, 2026 (digital); 978-1-71-834332-0
SSC	— a la carte 1	January 25, 2026; 978-4-8240-1456-6	—

=== Manga ===
A manga adaptation, illustrated by Akagishi K, began serialization on the Comic Gardo manga website on March 24, 2017. As of July 2025, the series' individual chapters have been collected in 11 tankōbon volumes. In April 2020, J-Novel Club announced that they also licensed the manga adaptation for English publication. In January 2025, J-Novel announced that the manga would begin print publication in September 2025.

A spin-off manga illustrated by Momo Futaba, titled Campfire Cooking in Another World with My Absurd Skill: Sui's Great Adventure (とんでもスキルで異世界放浪メシ スイの大冒険, Tondemo Sukiru de Isekai Hōrō Meshi: Sui no Daibōken), began serialization on the Comic Gardo website on August 24, 2018. As of February 2024, the series' individual chapters have been collected in eight tankōbon volumes. In September 2022, J-Novel Club announced that they also licensed the spin-off manga in English.

==== Volumes ====
===== Main series =====
No.	Original release date	Original ISBN	English release date	English ISBN
1	December 25, 2017	978-4-86-554297-4	October 28, 2020 (digital); September 9, 2025 (print)	978-1-71-834340-5 (digital); 978-1-71-833781-7 (print)
2	April 25, 2018	978-4-86-554341-4	January 13, 2021 (digital); November 11, 2025 (print)	978-1-71-834341-2 (digital); 978-1-71-833782-4 (print)
3	January 25, 2019	978-4-86-554445-9	June 2, 2021 (digital); January 13, 2026 (print)	978-1-71-834342-9 (digital); 978-1-71-833783-1 (print)
4	July 25, 2019	978-4-86-554529-6	August 25, 2021 (digital); March 10, 2026 (print)	978-1-71-834343-6 (digital); 978-1-71-833784-8 (print)
5	January 25, 2020	978-4-86-554607-1	October 26, 2021 (digital); May 11, 2026 (print)	978-1-71-834344-3 (digital); 978-1-71-833785-5 (print)
6	September 25, 2020	978-4-86-554752-8	February 2, 2022 (digital); July 14, 2026 (print)	978-1-71-834346-7 (digital); 978-1-71-833786-2 (print)
7	May 25, 2021	978-4-86-554923-2	April 13, 2022 (digital); September 8, 2026 (print)	978-1-71-834345-0 (digital); 978-1-71-833787-9 (print)
8	November 25, 2021	978-4-82-400055-2	June 22, 2022 (digital); November 10, 2026 (print)	978-1-71-834347-4 (digital); 978-1-71-833788-6 (print)
9	December 25, 2022	978-4-82-400373-7	October 18, 2023 (digital); January 12, 2027 (print)	978-1-71-834348-1 (digital); 978-1-71-833789-3 (print)
10	February 25, 2024	978-4-82-400747-6	January 15, 2025 (digital); March 9, 2027 (print)	978-1-71-834349-8 (digital); 978-1-71-833790-9 (print)
11	July 25, 2025	978-4-82-401277-7	March 11, 2026 (digital)	978-1-71-834350-4

===== Spin-off =====
No.	Original release date	Original ISBN	English release date	English ISBN
1	January 25, 2019	978-4-86-554444-2	November 9, 2022	978-1-71-834370-2
2	July 25, 2019	978-4-86-554528-9	January 11, 2023	978-1-71-834371-9
3	January 25, 2020	978-4-86-554606-4	March 29, 2023	978-1-71-834372-6
4	September 25, 2020	978-4-86-554751-1	July 12, 2023	978-1-71-834373-3
5	May 25, 2021	978-4-86-554922-5	January 10, 2024	978-1-71-834374-0
6	November 25, 2021	978-4-82-400054-5	April 3, 2024	978-1-71-834375-7
7	December 25, 2022	978-4-82-400372-0	June 18, 2025	978-1-71-834376-4
8	February 25, 2024	978-4-8240-0650-9	September 24, 2025	978-1-71-834377-1

=== Anime ===
An anime television series adaptation was announced on October 29, 2022. It is produced by MAPPA and directed by Kiyoshi Matsuda, with scripts written by Michiko Yokote, character designs handled by Nao Ōtsu, and music composed by Masato Kōda, Kana Utatane, and Kuricorder Quartet. The series aired from January 11 to March 29, 2023, on TV Tokyo and its affiliates. (Note: TV Tokyo listed the series premiere on January 10 at 24:00, which is effectively January 11 at midnight JST.) The opening theme song is "Zeitaku na Saji" (贅沢な匙; "Exquisite Spoon") by Van de Shop, while the ending theme song is "Happy-go-Journey" by Yuma Uchida. Crunchyroll streamed the series worldwide outside of Asia, while Muse Communication licensed the series in Asia-Pacific.

A second season was announced on October 29, 2023, which aired from on October 8 to December 24, 2025. (Note: TV Tokyo listed the season premiere on October 7 at 24:00, which is effectively October 8 at midnight JST.) For the second season, the opening theme song is "yummy goodday" by Cent Chihiro Chittiii, while the ending theme song is "SALT AND PEPPER" by chelmico.

==== Episodes ====
===== Season 1 (2023) =====
No. overall	No. in season	Title	Directed by (Note: Production staff information is taken from the ending credits of each episode.)	Written by	Storyboarded by	Original release date
1	1	"My Absurd Skill Is Unexpectedly Useful"; Transliteration: "Tondemo Sukiru wa Yakunitatsu" (Japanese: とんでもスキルは役に立つ)	Kiyoshi Matsuda	Michiko Yokote	Kiyoshi Matsuda	January 11, 2023
Tsuyoshi Mukouda (a.k.a. "Mukohda") is summoned from Japan to an alternate world with three others to become heroes of the Reijseger Kingdom. Unlike the others, who have skills in swordsmanship and magic, Mukohda only possesses the "Online Grocery" skill, which lets him spend money to buy food and other products online from Japan. Uninterested in becoming a hero and sensing that the Reijseger royals are untrustworthy, Mukohda convinces them his skill is useless and accepts money to quietly disappear. After finding further confirmation that the royals are tyrants, Mukohda abandons Reijseger and hires Werner and his Iron Will adventurers to escort him to the neighboring Veenen Kingdom. Mukohda provides them with food from his skill and prepares meals on a modern camping stove. Mukohda discovers Japanese ingredients boost health and magic, and decides to use only ingredients foraged by hand in case people discover his skill and try to take advantage. One night, Mukohda's cooking attracts a Fenrir, a legendary wolf monster, who demands to taste the food. The Fenrir is so impressed he insists on becoming Mukohda's contracted familiar in exchange for three meals a day. Calculating the cost of feeding his new Fenrir, Mukohda realizes he needs employment immediately.
2	2	"The Salient Familiar Is a Living Legend"; Transliteration: "Medatsu Jūma wa Ikiru Densetsu" (Japanese: 目立つ従魔は生きる伝説)	Kiyoshi Matsuda & Hiromi Nishiyama	Michiko Yokote	Hiromi Nishiyama	January 18, 2023
Mukohda names the Fenrir Fel. Werner tells him that entering Veenen will be difficult, as Fenrir are legendary monsters and sure to draw attention. Fel agrees to hunt for their meat as long as Mukohda cooks it, which also saves money. Fel does draw attention at the border, but is allowed to enter Veenen due to his familiar contract. Mukohda decides to register at the Merchants Guild, intending to use Online Grocery to become a traveling trader and see the world. Almost immediately, Mukohda receives an invite to meet Margrave Lindell but refuses. Mukohda registers as an Iron rank merchant, allowing him to run a mobile trading stall between cities. He discovers items like salt and pepper purchased from Online Grocery for 10 copper coins are rare commodities and sells a bag of each to the Guildmaster himself for 17 gold. Additionally, he joins the Adventurers Guild to sell valuable monster parts left over from Fel's meals, but learns he must complete one quest a month to maintain his membership. Keeping it simple, he accepts a quest to gather medicinal plants. Werner and his friends express hope of seeing Mukohda again, already missing his presence and exceptional cooking skills.
3	3	"My Super Power Is All About Cooking"; Transliteration: "Sugita Chikara wa Ryōri no Tame ni" (Japanese: 過ぎた力は料理の為に)	Takahiro Kaneko	Michiko Yokote	Takahiro Kaneko	January 25, 2023
Mukohda quickly completes the quest, and while Fel hunts more monster meat, he is able to use discounted ingredients to make spaghetti. Mukohda is disturbed by the fact that orcs, which possess a more humanoid appearance, are an acceptable food source that even humans eat. Fel starts letting Mukohda ride on his back to make traveling faster. Adventurer guild secretary Bianca, despite her abrasive personality, develops a soft spot for Fel. Mukohda has the monsters butchered, keeps the meat, and sells the rest of the body parts for 200 gold, with the butcher explaining the value of monster parts is often underestimated by amateurs. Mukohda also discovers that despite expectations, the orc meat is even tastier than pork. With Fel drawing so much attention, Mukohda decides it is safer to claim he is a Great-Wolf, not a Fenrir. Due to his new wealth, Mukohda celebrates by introducing Fel to Japanese Wagyu beef. Unfortunately, such high- quality Japanese meat boosts Fel's stats so high that he hunts even stronger monsters all night, including a rare Orc-General, an A-rank Ogre, and even a legendary Chimera. Exasperated by how many valuable monsters he needs butchered, Mukohda decides to never feed Fel wagyu again.
4	4	"Cannot Start the Journey Without a Map"; Transliteration: "Chizu ga Nakute wa Hajimaranai" (Japanese: 地図が無くては始まらない)	Parako Shinohara	Michiko Yokote	Parako Shinohara	February 1, 2023
Mukohda discovers he can use magic, but it is pathetically weak. Fel insists combat is the way to improve and forces a protesting Mukohda to fight a goblin village. Mukohda levels up his fire magic but faints from the strain, requiring Fel to save him. Fel rewards his effort by hunting a Goblin King, which while inedible, contains a valuable magic stone. Too exhausted to cook, Mukohda feeds Fel dessert pastries. Fel reveals he is blessed by Ninrir, the Wind Goddess, making wind magic his strongest element. Jealous, Mukohda calls out for any Goddess to give him a blessing. Elsewhere, a Goddess actually hears his request. To keep from wandering aimlessly, they enter a town to buy a map, but learn that due to the number of wars, accurate maps of the world are national secrets. At a pub, he buys a map showing the general location of the kingdoms and their dungeons for one gold. Learning from some adventurers, he was swindled since maps are a basic item available at all guilds for one silver. Having acquired a map, Mukohda decides to head east to a kingdom by the ocean.
5	5	"The Goddess of Wind Has a Sweet Tooth"; Transliteration: "Kaze no Megami wa Kanmi ga Osuki" (Japanese: 風の女神は甘味がお好き)	Kyoko Yamazaki	Erika Andō	Kiyoshi Matsuda	February 8, 2023
Ninrir takes an interest in Mukohda. Fel insists they rest by a lake so Mukohda can cook fish. Mukohda discovers a Slime monster that can eat anything and helpfully devours the packaging his Online orders arrived in. Fel reveals the Slime likes Mukohda, which, for such a simple monster, constitutes a Contract. Mukohda names his new familiar Sui, who begins levelling up fast when Mukohda feeds him actual food. Once Mukohda trains Sui not to eat his utensils, Sui is able to do the washing up. Ninrir sends Fel a Revelation; she will grant Mukohda her blessing to increase his magic and resistance to injury, in exchange for an offering of sweets once a week. Mukohda makes an offering of sweet buns and is granted the blessing. Meanwhile, Ninrir, a young goddess with a severe sweet tooth, devours the buns and begins sending Mukohda Revelations every few days, which are little more than lists of sweets she wants. She throws tantrums when he tries to stick to their deal of one offering per week. Despite the blessing, Fel is disappointed by Mukohda's progress with combat magic and takes him to a special area where his abilities should improve rapidly.
6	6	"Growth Happens Out of Nowhere"; Transliteration: "Seichō wa Totsuzen Yattekuru" (Japanese: 成長は突然やってくる)	Tatsuya Sasaki	Shigeru Murakoshi	Ikuo Morimoto	February 15, 2023
Fel forces Mukohda to enter a recently appeared dungeon and fight monsters to rapidly improve his Earth magic (Stone Bullet) so Mukohda prepares by eating Japanese ingredients for the temporary status boosts. Forced to fight without Fel's assistance, Mukohda becomes more proficient at Stone Bullet, and able to fire three bullets simultaneously. He discovers Sui is useful in combat with strong Acid Bullets. After defeating an army of Kobolds, Mukohda is confronted by the dungeon boss, Kobold King, enraged by the death of his army. Mukohda desperately upgrades Stone Bullet to Stone Cannon and injures the king, but runs out of magic, so Sui kills the king instead and levels up while Mukohda passes out. Awakening, Mukohda discovers Sui can now speak in a childlike manner and refers to the outraged Fel as Uncle Fel, and while they have both leveled up, Mukohda is disappointed Sui is actually stronger than he is, but he still treats everyone to huge helpings of Oyakodon made with stat-boosting Japanese ingredients.
7	7	"The Wolf Dances with Monsters"; Transliteration: "Ōkami wa Majū to Odoru" (Japanese: 狼は魔獣と踊る)	Kenji Takahashi	Shigeru Murakoshi	Kenji Takahashi	February 22, 2023
Fel insists on a shortcut through Griffon territories, so Mukohda spends the whole time terrified. Along the way, Mukohda discovers rare healing mushrooms can even heal stab wounds and broken bones. Sui eats one and gains a skill to produce multiple types of healing potions, including one so powerful it can save people from certain death. A griffon challenges Fel to a duel to prove himself the dominant griffon among his flock. Fel wins, requiring Sui's new potions to save the griffon. Mukohda notices Fel was also injured, a feat few have achieved, and the other griffons agree that Griffon is the new leader. Griffon gives Mukohda a feather guaranteeing him safe passage in Griffon territory forever. Fel is furious that Mukohda has been forgetting his offerings to Ninrir. After six weeks on the shortcut, they exit Griffon territory and find a trading caravan under attack by bandits. Fel scares the bandits into surrender, and the caravan's grateful owner Lambert invites them to accompany him to Karelina, a city close to where Mukohda wanted to visit the ocean. Ninrir later forces Mukohda to grovel for neglecting her offerings and only relents when he offers a huge selection of Western-style desserts.
8	8	"All of the Boss Monsters Are Tasty"; Transliteration: "Bosu Kyara wa Dore mo Umai" (Japanese: ボスキャラはどれも美味い)	Iho Ishikawa	Michiko Yokote	Takashi Kawabata	March 1, 2023
While traveling with the caravan, Mukohda learns rumours of Fel have reached most of the kingdoms already and fears they have drawn too much attention. Arriving at Karelina City, Mukohda discovers his adventurer's membership has been revoked for not completing any quests in over a month. After renewing his membership he causes a stir among Lambert's guards by revealing all the monsters Fel caught on their trip, many of which are extremely high quality. Mukohda decides he needs a promotion to F-rank adventurer for the increased benefits which will make feeding Fel easier. Ninrir makes her latest demand for sweets, scolding Mukohda for forgetting her again. Mukohda is forced to take a quest to fight goblins to begin raising his rank. Sui hunts the minimum of three goblins for the contract but goes overboard having fun and hunts a whole goblin village, causing Sui to evolve again, gaining the ability to alter his size or split into 100 separate slimes. Having hunted enough goblins for his promotion in less than a day, plus Sui's dramatic evolution, Mukohda again worries they are drawing too much attention. Ninrir enjoys her latest offering of egg pudding, but her joy attracts the attention of other goddesses.
9	9	"Hunting Quests Are All About Meat and Money"; Transliteration: "Tōbatsu Irai wa Kane to Niku" (Japanese: 討伐依頼は金と肉)	Kyoko Yamazaki	Erika Andō	Tetsuo Hirakawa	March 8, 2023
For the killing the goblins, Guild Master Willem reveals the Royal family have granted Mukohda complete freedom within their kingdoms borders. Willem promotes him directly to C-Rank in exchange for quietly giving several troublesome monster slaying quests to Fel. Mukohda sells Fel's latest kills to the guild but two of them, a Chimera and Orthrus, are turned away as they are so valuable the guild can't afford them. With the money for the goblins plus selling the monsters, Mukohda earns 2000 gold, the largest single payment in guild history. Fel is asked to kill a Mithril-lizard and a herd of Bloodyhorn-bulls. Mukohda visits Lambert's shop and buys a nicer bag for Sui to sleep in, a knife belt, wallet and new boots. As Lambert is primarily a leather merchant, he asks to buy any high quality monster skins Mukohda acquires in the future, especially from snake type monsters. With an overabundance of meat, Mukohda cooks so much even Fel can't eat it all. Ninrir gorges herself on the sweets Mukohda sends her but resents Mukohda's warnings too many will make her fat. The other goddesses are intrigued by the other world food.
10	10	"My Two Familiars Are Too Overpowered"; Transliteration: "Nihiki no Jūma wa Chīto ga Sugiru" (Japanese: 二匹の従魔はチートが過ぎる)	Yasutomo Okamoto	Erika Andō	Yasutomo Okamoto	March 15, 2023
Mukohda finds the Metal-lizard has evolved into a Mithril-lizard, but Fel still kills it easily. Mukohda also gathers some valuable mithril ore it had been eating. Fel also hunts the entire Bloodyhorn-bull herd with Sui's help. Returning to the guild, Mukohda learns the city lord will undoubtedly want the lizard as a gift for the king, plus the location of the undiscovered mithril ore, all in exchange for 5000 gold. After a feast of bull meat, Mukohda prepares an offering for Ninrir, only to be confronted by three more goddesses who not only offer their own blessings for otherworld offerings, they also reveal Ninrir as a cheapskate who only gave him a minor wind blessing, even though he has no affinity for wind magic. Despite fearing the fame would come from being the only living human with blessings from multiple Goddesses, Mukohda receives blessings from Earth Goddess Kisharle and Fire Goddess Agni. As he has no affinity for water, the Water Goddess Rusalka blesses Sui instead, so Mukohda offers a bumper size sweet box for the Goddesses to share. Fel is impressed with Mukohda and Sui's new powers and hunts the snake monster Lambert had requested.
11	11	"Doing Business for the Missus"; Transliteration: "Shōbai wa Gofujin no Tame ni" (Japanese: 商売は御婦人の為に)	Yūki Itō	Shigeru Murakoshi	Yūki Itō	March 22, 2023
After sending the black snake to be butchered, Mukohda makes hamburgers. After selling the snakeskin to Lambert, Mukohda shows Lambert modern soap, shampoo and conditioner. Lambert buys them straight away as an anniversary gift for his wife Marie. Mukohda learns Lambert possesses a bathtub, a rare and expensive luxury item. Marie loves the shampoo so much Lambert agrees to sell it for Mukohda since Mukohda doesn't have a shop of his own. The city lord pays Mukohda for the Mithril-lizard and a bonus for the mine location, 5800 gold. A swarm of feral wyverns attack and many adventurers are injured and poisoned. After treating them with Sui's powerful healing potion, Willem issues an emergency quest to slay the wyverns. Many adventurers aren't strong enough so Fel and Sui volunteer to kill all the wyverns while Mukohda turns the remaining hamburgers into cutlets. Elsewhere, the three Japanese teenagers summoned as heroes, Kaito, Kanon and Rio all wonder whatever became of Mukohda with his seemingly useless Online Grocery skill and doubt he is even still alive. They also hope to one day meet the rumoured legendary adventurer who tamed a Fenrir, also lamenting they do not have cooking skills.
12	12	"Adventures Are as Countless as Varieties of Food"; Transliteration: "Bōken wa Shoku no Kazu Hodo" (Japanese: 冒険は食の数ほど)	Kiyoshi Matsuda	Michiko Yokote	Kiyoshi Matsuda	March 29, 2023
Unfortunately, Willem cannot afford to buy the wyverns. At Mukohda's next offering to the Goddesses, they all make different requests; Ninrir still wants sweets but Kisharle wants shampoo, Agni wants alcohol and Rusalka wants the same meals he feeds Fel. After purchasing a bathtub, Mukohda and Sui construct a bathhouse and Mukohda finally bathes. The wyvern meat Mukohda uses to make Gyudon followed by stew. Fel returns, having hunted an Earth-dragon, and Mukohda finally scolds his reckless choice of prey since his item box is now full of monsters so valuable no one is rich enough to buy them. As punishment, he refuses to make Fel's dinner until he has had his bath. Despite Fel's protests, Mukohda is able to wash him with dog shampoo. Once clean, Fel gets his dinner but is disconcerted when Mukohda decides he must bathe once a month. The Earth-dragon is so valuable Willem dare not let it be butchered in case the other parts are damaged. Instead, he tells Mukohda to visit Dolan city where the guild-master is a dragon expert. This would also allow Mukohda to finally visit the ocean. After saying their farewells, they depart for Dolan city.

===== Season 2 (2025) =====
No. overall	No. in season	Title	Directed by	Written by	Storyboarded by	Original release date
13	1	"My New Friend Is Absurd"; Transliteration: "Arata na Nakama wa Tondemo nai" (Japanese: 新たな仲間はとんでもない)	Kiyoshi Matsuda & Kenji Takahashi	Michiko Yokote	Kiyoshi Matsuda	October 8, 2025
A dozen Venom Tarantulas attack Fel, who kills them. Mukohda saves them for later before making Gyoza from Orc General meat. A Pixie Dragon, an incredibly rare species, smells the food and begs to try some. Fel warns him Pixie Dragons are extremely fast and use magic. After trying the food, the dragon casts a spell making himself Mukohda's familiar. Mukohda names him Dora and is exasperated to have yet another food-loving familiar. In Krehl, the City of Textiles, Guild Master Rodolfo asks Mukohda to investigate why the Venom Tarantula's are becoming overly aggressive, since the city relies on their silk to make fabric. Mukohda reveals Fel killed the out of control tarantulas already and sells Rodolfa the shells and silk while keeping the meat. He also purchases new clothes from the local shops. Mukohda discovers spiders are similar to crab, so he cooks fried rice, salad, omelettes and spring rolls. Dora reveals he has been following the scent of Mukohda's cooking since Karelina and was accidentally responsible for the Tarantulas aggressiveness. That night, Mukohda falls asleep, forgetting the weekly offering for the irate Goddesses. Before leaving for Dolan, Mukohda leaves Rodolfo the valuable spider shells.
14	2	"I Will Process the Earth Dragon"; Transliteration: "Chiryū Kaitai Uketamawarimasu" (Japanese: 地竜解体承ります)	Issei Nagamatsu	Michiko Yokote	Kiyoshi Matsuda	October 15, 2025
The group arrive in the dungeon city Dolan seeking the elf Elrand, the Dolan Guild Master who can process the Earth Dragon. Mukohda also meets Vice-Guild Master Ugohl. Elrand is stunned when he realises Dora is nothing like his species description in books. They rest for the night and Mukohda makes Jingisukan. The next morning, Elrand is shocked when the guild's historical mithril dagger snaps against the dragon's skin, meaning he needs a mithril blade of even higher quality. As Dolan has a dungeon, Ugohl suggests mining for ore to smith a new one. Mukohda refuses in case Fel goes battle crazy in the dungeon and draws attention, so he distracts him by making orc meat kimchi rice bowls. The Goddesses grow even more upset with Mukohda until their complaining draws the unwanted attention of Hephaestos, the God of Blacksmithing, and Vahagn, the God of War. Realizing the Goddesses have been trading blessings for offerings, Hephaestos grants Sui a blacksmithing blessing so he could smith a knife himself, and Vahagn blesses Fel and Dora with combat abilities, all in exchange for other-world alcohol. Fel reminds Mukohda they still have mithril from the mithril lizard, which Mukohda had forgotten about. Sui absorbs the mithril and smiths a knife of near perfect quality.
15	3	"Guaranteed Three-Star Earth Dragon Steak"; Transliteration: "Mittsu-boshi Kakutei Chiryū Sutēki" (Japanese: 三つ星確定地竜ステーキ)	Kyoko Yamazaki	Yōhei Yamazaki	Kyoko Yamazaki	October 22, 2025
Elrand gets to work with the new knife. Fel, Dora and Sui convince Mukohda to visit the dungeon and test Vahagn's blessings. Mukohda learns the dungeon has 30 floors and has never been fully conquered, so he needs to prepare supplies. Mukohda buys a magic oven which he tests by making Bloody Bull and Wyvern gyudon for dinner. For meals that will be consumed inside the dungeon, he also prepares braised Orc General, Red Boar with cabbage, Bloody Bull green pepper stir-fry, Orc General soup and Wyvern stew. He also has Sui forge a mithril sword for protection. Elrand finishes the dragon and immediately buys some of the blood, liver and a tooth for 3800 gold coins. Faced with so much money, Mukohda worries how much the rest of the dragon will be worth. As promised, Mukohda invites Elrand to dinner where he prepares roast Dragon meat with garlic sauce. Elrand enjoys the meal so much he cries. Hephaestos and Vahagn scold the Goddesses for forgetting to give Mukohda a defensive blessing, since if he dies there will be no more offerings. When Mukohda makes his weekly offering, Hephaestos interrupts and grants Mukohda a defence skill. They head, to the dungeon where Mukohda encounters Vianca working at the desk and notices she is still obsessed with Fel.
16	4	"The Dungeon with Ready-Made Food"; Transliteration: "Danjon wa Ozōsai to Tomoni" (Japanese: ダンジョンはお惣菜とともに)	Iho Ishikawa	Shigeru Murakoshi	Iho Ishikawa	October 29, 2025
The group enters the dungeon, but the impatient Fel runs them all the way down to floor 10. Mukohda is surprised many party's stop at floor 10, more interested in making a living than exploring further. Dora defeats a boss Tarantula with Vahagn's blessing so Mukohda collects the valuable parts. Lower down they find a rest area and encounter Werner and his Iron Will party. Mukohda shares wyvern stew with them before they go their separate ways. Fel, Dora and Sui defeat boss monsters all the way to floor 20 where Mukohda finds a treasure chest. Fel warns him it contains poisonous gas. Ninrir suddenly informs Mukohda all the Gods and Goddesses blessings have combined so he is effectively immune to almost everything that would kill a normal human, including poison. Mukohda opens the chest and finds gas poison but no treasure. He finds a Mimic monster disguised as a chest on floor 21 and kills it with his mithril sword, causing it to drop jewels and a magic recovery ring. On floor 22, they find a forest where Mukohda insists they eat. From Online Grocery, he buys other-world meat dishes including yakitori chicken, roasted duck and wagyu steaks. Everyone's stats are temporarily boosted by the meat except Mukohda, whose increase is pitiful.
17	5	"Is the Enemy Monsters or Hunger?"; Transliteration: "Teki wa Monsutā ka Kūfuku ka" (Japanese: 敵はモンスターか空腹か)	Kenji Takahashi	Shigeru Murakoshi	Kenji Takahashi	November 5, 2025
In the forest, they encounter an S-rank Vasuki snake which Fel, Dora and Sui defeat before moving on to floor 23, which specialises in giant monsters. Finding a rest area, they stop for lunch of orc soup, steak sandwiches and hamburg sandwiches. The A-rank party Tempest appears and Mukohda donates a healing potion to one of their injured members, as their leader explains that they will be returning to the surface. Mukohda loots a magic bag from another monster he uses to store treasure. Eventually they enter floor 30, which has never been conquered. Floor 30 turns out to be an immense desert so hot Sui almost melts. Mukohda helps by providing ice cream and sports drinks for hydration. He also provides heating pads and Rock Bird udon as the desert drops to below freezing at night. The next morning, they enter the final boss room and confront Behemoth, which has skin impervious to magic and physical damage. They eventually realize Sui's acid weakens the skin, allowing them to kill it. As a prize, Behemoth drops the adamantite lightning sword Caladbolg. To celebrate, Mukohda makes a feast of fried foods; rockbird karaage, Japanese fried meats and vegetables and American corn dogs.
18	6	"Online Grocery Levels Up"; Transliteration: "Netto Sūpā, Reberu Appu Suru" (Japanese: ネットスーパー、レベルアップする)	Tensai Okamura	Michiko Yokote	Ai Kondō	November 12, 2025
Elrand is eager to interview Mukohda after being the first to conquer the dungeon, but Ugohl insists they be allowed to rest. The group rescues two children, Darrel and Iris, from an orc in the forest. Darrel explains their father was an adventurer who died, so now they live alone with their mother. Recently their mother became sick, so Darrel and Iris have been gathering herbs to sell and hire a healing priest. Mukohda plans to give them a healing potion, but Fel explains only the immortality granting Elixir is powerful enough to cure disease. Mukohda remembers Elrand mentioned dragon blood and liver can make Elixir, so he try gives some of the blood and liver to Sui to create it. Sui produces a Degraded Elixir powerful enough to cure disease, but not grant immortality. Mukohda trades them the Elixir for the dead orc and sends them home. Darrel decides he wants to be a merchant like Mukohda. Mukohda discovers Online Grocery has levelled up, allowing him to buy speciality cakes and puddings. The Gods are furious Mukohda once again forgets their offerings, especially now he has cakes. The children's mother recovers and Darrel promises to become a great merchant and repay Mukohda properly.
19	7	"Street Snacking Heaven"; Transliteration: "Kai-gui Tengoku" (Japanese: 買い食い天国)	Chie Yamashiro	Yōhei Yamazaki	Shingo Uchida	November 19, 2025 (Note: This episode aired at 12:06 a.m. JST, 6 minutes after the regular air time on TV Tokyo.)
Elrand appraises the magic bag Mukohda filled with jewels and reveals they are of such high quality the guild doesn't have enough money to buy them. Instead, Ugohl has arranged to negotiate with the Merchant's Guild. Mukohda doesn't have time to cook, so he takes Fel, Sui and Dora to the local food stalls where they try Horned Rabbit skewers. The Merchant's Guild master Adriano and his appraiser Ruslan are amazed by the jewels, especially an ultra-rare Imperial Topaz. In total, they offer Mukohda 7460 gold coins, the most money he has ever earned. And yet Ugohl insists for a collection that includes an Imperial Topaz, the price they offered was so low it was practically an insult to Mukohda and the Adventurer's Guild. Panicking at the possibility of losing the Adventurer's Guild as customers, Adriano raises the offer to 9480, which Ugohl accepts. For defeating the undefeated dungeon, Mukohda is promoted from C-rank to an A-rank adventurer, meaning he can now take on royal quests. To celebrate, Mukohda makes Orc bacon wrapped Bloody Horn Bull meatloaf. He also thanks Ugohl with cakes for his wife and children. The Gods and Goddesses, fascinated by the expansion to Mukohda's Online Grocery, take an interest in Japan so they can be more specific when requesting offerings.
20	8	"Do Blacksmiths Dream of BBQ?"; Transliteration: "Kajiya wa BBQ no Yume wo Miru ka" (Japanese: 鍛冶屋はBBQの夢を見るか)	Kenji Takahashi	Michiko Yokote	Kenji Takahashi	November 26, 2025
Wanting to barbecue, Mukohda tries to have a blacksmith make him a grill, but they all violently refuse to forge anything except weapons. As most blacksmiths are dwarves, Ugohl suggests bribing them with alcohol. Mukohda purchases whisky through Online Grocery and bribes a dwarf blacksmith named Ale. The whisky reminds Mukohda he hasn't offered anything to the Gods in weeks. Praying to them, he endures their scolding for forgetting them, but when they demand he reach level 40 to unlock even more Online Grocery options he threatens to stop the offerings permanently. In the end, they apologise for pressuring him, in exchange for doubling the amount he can offer to them. Mukohda makes Roasted Cockatrice stuffed with Pilaf. Meanwhile, eager for Mukohda to level up Online Grocery, Hephaestos and Vahagn secretly grant him a Blessing that doubles his experience. Ale finishes the grill so Mukohda tests it by barbecuing Orc and Bloody-Horn Bull. As an extra gratitude to Ale, Mukohda makes him a Highball; whisky, soda water and fresh lemon with ice in a mithril glass. Later, Mukohda learns Hephaestos secretly gave Ale a one-time blessing so the grill can be instantly cleaned by just pouring water on it, no scrubbing required.
21	9	"Vacation Comes With Subjugation"; Transliteration: "Bakansu wa Tōbatsu to Tomoni" (Japanese: バカンスは討伐とともに)	Iho Ishikawa	Shigeru Murakoshi	Iho Ishikawa	December 3, 2025
Mukohda plans to leave Dolan to visit new places as he and Sui try a sausage recipe they got from Ale. Elrand reminds Mukohda to bring him any dragons he hunts, including a Leviathan if possible. They arrive in Nijhoff, a town famous for its pottery. Local guildmaster Goran, a friend of Ugohl's, asks them to complete two difficult quests; clear out carnivorous Evil Flora in the forest, and exterminate Cyclops that have taken over the village's clay mine. Mukohda visits Merchant Guild Vice-Manager Domenico to rent a large house, and makes Orc curry for dinner. After giving a reluctant Fel a much-needed shower, Mukohda falls asleep. The next morning, Fel and Dora exterminate the main Evil Flora while Mukohda takes out smaller ones with weedkiller. The job ends so quickly they decide to kill the Cyclops too. Sui evolves into a Huge Slime with the new skill Giganticize. Mukohda discovers killing the Evil Flora himself has made him level 30 due to the Double Experience blessing. He resolves to yell at Hephaestos and Vahagn the next time he sends offerings. Fel reveals if Sui keeps evolving he may one day become an Emperor Slime, a species almost as strong as Fel.
22	10	"Dinner Starts with One Dish"; Transliteration: "Dinā wa Ichi-mai no Shokki Kara" (Japanese: ディナーは一枚の食器から)	Kenji Takashi & Ayaka Sugiyama	Yōhei Yamazaki	Mitsukuni Samoto	December 10, 2025
Giganticize lets Sui grow to the size of a house, which Fel has never seen other Huge Slimes do, especially not one only three months old like Sui. For breakfast, Mukohda makes Cockatrice rice bowls, while Guild Butcher Horace processes the Cyclops for them. Mukohda goes shopping for dishes and buys a variety of items for different occasions. Having grown bored on their long trip, Fel demands they raid a dungeon. Mukohda claims preparing enough food in advance will take too long so he agrees to find a quest instead. Horace reveals there is a new orc camp that will require at least six C-rank parties. Mukohda volunteers to join the only other C-rank party available, Shadow Warrior; Alonso, Clement, Matthias and Ernest. As walking will take two days, Mukohda lets Shadow Warrior ride on Sui in his giant form to keep up with Fel, reaching the camp in hours. Fel, Dora and Sui do most of the fighting, with Mukohda and Shadow Warrior killing the few orcs that try escaping. To celebrate, Mukohda makes Bloody Bull burgers. After leaving the orcs with Horace and splitting the reward with Shadow Warrior, Mukohda decides to make a special meal for their last night in the rented house; Salt-baked Bull with mustard sauce and speciality cakes for dessert. The next day, the group sets out for Berleand.
23	11	"Fight?! The Great Sea Battle"; Transliteration: "Tatakae!? Dai Kaijū Kessen" (Japanese: 戦え!? 大海獣決戦)	Akiko Seki	Shigeru Murakoshi	Akiko Seki	December 17, 2025
The group arrives in Berleand where a merchant explains a kraken has blockaded the harbour and ruined Berleand's famous fish market. Local guild master Marx is thrilled they agree to slay the kraken and agrees they can keep the body. Mukohda rents another mansion and uses the kitchen to make Hayashi Rice with Minotaur meat. The next day, Fel admits the last kraken he fought came in close to the shore so he was able to kill it with lightning, but this one seems to stay out in deeper water so he is unsure how they will reach it. Unable to get to the kraken, Mukohda fears they will have to abandon the quest, but suddenly realises Sui can grow large enough to carry them. Riding on Sui, they reach the kraken but find it already in battle with a sea serpent. Unconcerned, Fel and Dora kill both monsters in one shot. An even bigger Aspidochelone monster tries to steal the bodies, but is killed by Sui. Since it will be impossible to eat all the meat before it rots, Mukohda shares it with the whole of Berleand, utilising the fisherman to help with butchering and cooking grilled kraken. Full of energy after devouring the kraken, the fishermen go fishing all night to resupply the empty fish market.
24	12	"A New Return"; Transliteration: "Aratanaru Kikan" (Japanese: 新たなる帰還)	Kiyoshi Matsuda & Ai Kondō	Michiko Yokote	Kiyoshi Matsuda	December 24, 2025
The next morning, the fishermen give Mukohda discounts at their stalls. Mukohda is eager to try raw oyster, but is warned by the vendor not to eat any local fish raw as he will be infected with worms and die. Realising he won't be able to make Sashimi, Mukohda instead makes Okonomiyaki with kraken, shrimp, tuna, oyster and seaweed. Full of energy, Fel, Sui and Dora go hunting for local monsters. Marx visits Mukohda with a letter from Lambert requesting more soap and shampoo for his shop, as well as reminding Mukohda the leather cloak he asked for is almost ready. Mukohda notices Marx is acting worried. Fel returns and reveals they have hunted a Red Dragon, meaning they will have to return to Dolan to let Elrand butcher it before going to see Lambert. As a treat, Mukohda makes shaved ice and Fel and Dora experience brain-freeze. They visit the guild and find everyone panicking at news of an even more dangerous beast nearby. Mukohda guiltily reveals the Red Dragon to Marx, explaining they already killed it. Marx urges Mukohda to think about accepting a promotion to S-rank. Mukohda makes offerings to the Goddesses and is surprised this time they all request okonomiyaki and alcohol. The next day, they depart Berleand to continue their adventures.

== Reception ==
In 2018, the manga adaptation was ranked as the second best isekai manga by Japanese bookstore employees.

The novel series was one of three novels series that won in the novel category of the Piccoma Award 2024.

At the 10th Crunchyroll Anime Awards in 2026, the anime's second season was nominated for Best Isekai Anime.

== See also ==
- An Archdemon's Dilemma: How to Love Your Elf Bride—A light novel series the spin-off manga of which is also illustrated by Momo Futaba.
- Sabikui Bisco—A light novel series also illustrated by K Akagishi
