= Animeta! =

Japanese manga series

- First tankōbon volume cover, featuring Miyuki Sanada

アニメタ!
- Genre: Drama, slice of life
- Manga
- Written by: Yaso Hanamura
- Published by: Kodansha
- English publisher: NA: J-Novel Club
- Magazine: Morning Two
- Original run: June 22, 2015 – present
- Volumes: 5
- icon

Animeta! (Japanese: アニメタ!) is a Japanese manga series written and illustrated by Yaso Hanamura. It began serialization in Kodansha's Morning Two magazine in June 2015. As of January 2020, the series' individual chapters have been collected into five volumes.

== Publication ==
Written and illustrated by Yaso Hanamura, a former animator, the series began serialization in Kodansha's Morning Two magazine on June 22, 2015. The magazine ceased print publication and moved to a digital release starting on August 4, 2022. As of January 2020, the series' individual chapters have been collected into five tankōbon volumes.

In December 2018, J-Novel Club announced that they licensed the series for English publication.

=== Volumes ===
No.	Original release date	Original ISBN	English release date	English ISBN
1	December 22, 2015	978-4-06-388547-7	June 17, 2019 (digital); October 1, 2019 (print)	978-1-71-833700-8
2	May 23, 2016	978-4-06-388603-0	October 2, 2019 (digital); January 7, 2020 (print)	978-1-71-833702-2
3	October 21, 2016	978-4-06-388656-6	January 8, 2020 (digital); April 7, 2020 (print)	978-1-71-833704-6
4	October 23, 2017	978-4-06-388730-3	June 10, 2020 (digital); August 4, 2020 (print)	978-1-71-833706-0
5	January 23, 2020	978-4-06-515524-0	February 3, 2021 (digital); April 6, 2021 (print)	978-1-71-833708-4

== Reception ==
Rebecca Silverman from Anime News Network praised the story and illustrations; she felt the story offered a great insight into the anime industry. Demelza from Anime UK News also praised the story and illustrations, favorably comparing the tone to that of Complex Age. Kazuya Masumoto of Studio Trigger felt the story was realistic and recommended the series to anyone interested in seeing how the anime industry works.
