= Doll-Kara =

Japanese manga series

- First tankōbon volume cover

どるから (Dorukara)
- Genre: Sports; Supernatural
- Manga
- Written by: Kei Ryuzoji; Kazuyoshi Ishii
- Illustrated by: Hanamura
- Published by: Takeshobo
- English publisher: NA: J-Novel Club
- Imprint: Bamboo Comics
- Magazine: Web Comic Gamma
- Original run: May 30, 2017 – April 11, 2025
- Volumes: 11

Doll-Kara (Japanese: どるから, Hepburn: Dorukara) is a Japanese manga series written by Kei Ryuzoji, illustrated by Hanamura and based on an original story provided by Kazuyoshi Ishii. It was serialized on Takeshobo's Web Comic Gamma manga website from May 2017 to April 2025, with its chapters compiled into eleven tankōbon volumes.

== Synopsis ==
After serving his sentence for tax evasion, Kazuyoshi Ishii was freed from Shizuoka Prison only for his life to get cut short by a speeding truck. He later reincarnates into the body of Kei Ichinose, a comatose high school girl. Ishii later learns that Kei's father ran a dojo that fell into turmoil after her father's death, leading Kei to attempt suicide. After learning of Kei's background, Ishii resolves to keep her father's dojo afloat.

== Publication ==
Written by Kei Ryuzoji, illustrated by Hanamura, and based on an original story by Kazuyoshi Ishii, Doll-Kara was serialized on Takeshobo's Web Comic Gamma manga website from May 30, 2017, to April 11, 2025. Its chapters were compiled into eleven tankōbon volumes released from February 19, 2018, to July 16, 2025. In March 2022, J-Novel Club announced that they had licensed the series for English publication.

No.	Original release date	Original ISBN	North American release date	North American ISBN
1	February 19, 2018	978-4-8019-6186-9	June 1, 2022	978-1-7183-8420-0
Chapters 1–5; Side Story
2	April 20, 2018	978-4-8019-6239-2	July 15, 2022	978-1-7183-8421-7
Chapters 6–10; Side Story
3	November 17, 2018	978-4-8019-6435-8	October 31, 2022	978-1-7183-8422-4
Chapters 11–16; Side Story
4	September 19, 2019	978-4-8019-6755-7	February 28, 2023	978-1-7183-8423-1
Chapters 17–22; Side Story
5	January 20, 2020	978-4-8019-6435-8	June 21, 2023	978-1-7183-8424-8
Chapters 23–29
6	October 7, 2020	978-4-8019-7109-7	September 20, 2023	978-1-7183-8425-5
Chapters 30–35; Side Story
7	April 24, 2021	978-4-8019-7288-9	January 17, 2024	978-1-7183-8426-2
Chapters 36–41; Side Story
8	November 11, 2021	978-4-8019-7483-8	July 3, 2024	978-1-7183-8427-9
Chapters 42–47
9	June 16, 2022	978-4-8019-7665-8	February 5, 2025	978-1-7183-8428-6
Chapters 48–53; Side Story
10	August 17, 2023	978-4-8019-8131-7	May 14, 2025	978-1-7183-8429-3
Chapters 54–59; Side Story
11	July 16, 2025	978-4-8019-8693-0	April 8, 2026	978-1-7183-8430-9
Chapters 60–65

== Reception ==
The series was nominated for Japan Society and Anime NYC's first American Manga Awards in 2024 in the Best Translation category.
