= Cooking with Wild Game =

Japanese light novel series

- First light novel volume cover

異世界料理道 (Isekai Ryōridō)
- Genre: Isekai, cooking, romance
- Novel series
- Written by: EDA
- Published by: Shōsetsuka ni Narō
- Original run: August 19, 2014 – present
- Light novel
- Written by: EDA
- Illustrated by: Kochimo
- Published by: Hobby Japan
- English publisher: NA: J-Novel Club
- Imprint: HJ Novels
- Original run: February 20, 2015 – present
- Volumes: 38
- Manga
- Written by: EDA
- Illustrated by: Kochimo
- Published by: Hobby Japan
- English publisher: NA: J-Novel Club
- Imprint: HJ Comics
- Magazine: Comic Fire
- Original run: September 29, 2017 – present
- Volumes: 14

Cooking with Wild Game (異世界料理道, Isekai Ryōridō) is a Japanese isekai light novel series written by EDA and illustrated by Kochimo. It began serialization online in 2014 on the user-generated novel publishing website Shōsetsuka ni Narō. It was acquired by Hobby Japan, who published the first light novel volume in October 2015 under their HJ Novels imprint. Thirty-seven volumes have been released as of December 2025. A manga adaptation with art by Kochimo has been serialized online via Hobby Japan's Comic Fire website since 2018. Both the light novel and manga have been licensed in North America by J-Novel Club.

== Premise ==
Asuta Tsurumi is a Japanese teenager who manages a restaurant with his father. When a fire breaks out at the restaurant, Asuta enters the burning building to retrieve his father's cooking knife, and finds himself in another world with nothing but the clothes on his back and his father's knife. He encounters Ai Fa, a woman who is a member of a group of people living at the edge of a forest, and teaches the community about the value of well-cooked food using a boar-like animal known as giba.

== Media ==
=== Light novels ===
The light novel series was originally published by EDA as a free-to-read web novel on Shōsetsuka ni Narō in 2014 and Hobby Japan published the first volume in print with illustrations by Kochimo in October 2015. As of June 19, 2026, thirty-eight volumes have been published, with the series moving to a digital-only release from volume thirty-six onwards. The light novel is licensed in North America by J-Novel Club. As of May 2026, thirty-three English volumes have been published.

No.	Original release date	Original ISBN	English release date	English ISBN
1	February 20, 2015	978-4-7986-0965-2	February 9, 2019 (digital)	978-1-7183-3400-7
2	April 22, 2015	978-4-7986-1007-8	April 13, 2019 (digital)	978-1-7183-3402-1
3	June 24, 2015	978-4-7986-1032-0	June 30, 2019 (digital)	978-1-7183-3404-5
4	September 19, 2015	978-4-7986-1075-7	September 14, 2019 (digital)	978-1-7183-3406-9
5	December 22, 2015	978-4-7986-1140-2	December 3, 2019 (digital)	978-1-7183-3408-3
6	March 24, 2016	978-4-7986-1196-9	February 22, 2020 (digital)	978-1-7183-3410-6
7	June 22, 2016	978-4-7986-1243-0	May 10, 2020 (digital)	978-1-7183-3412-0
8	September 23, 2016	978-4-7986-1291-1	August 1, 2020 (digital)	978-1-7183-3414-4
9	December 22, 2016	978-4-7986-1354-3	September 27, 2020 (digital)	978-1-7183-3416-8
10	March 23, 2017	978-4-7986-1413-7	November 28, 2020 (digital)	978-1-7183-3418-2
11	June 22, 2017	978-4-7986-1469-4	February 13, 2021 (digital)	978-1-7183-3420-5
12	November 22, 2017	978-4-7986-1533-2	May 3, 2021 (digital)	978-1-7183-3422-9
13	February 23, 2018	978-4-7986-1629-2	July 20, 2021 (digital)	978-1-7183-3424-3
14	May 24, 2018	978-4-7986-1698-8	October 5, 2021 (digital)	978-1-7183-3426-7
15	September 22, 2018	978-4-7986-1753-4	December 20, 2021 (digital)	978-1-7183-3428-1
16	January 25, 2019	978-4-7986-1846-3	March 21, 2022 (digital)	978-1-7183-3430-4
17	April 23, 2019	978-4-7986-1910-1	June 13, 2022 (digital)	978-1-7183-3432-8
18	July 23, 2019	978-4-7986-1966-8	September 5, 2022 (digital)	978-1-7183-3434-2
19	November 22, 2019	978-4-7986-2049-7	November 28, 2022 (digital)	978-1-7183-3436-6
20	March 21, 2020	978-4-7986-2149-4	February 27, 2023 (digital)	978-1-7183-3438-0
21	June 22, 2020	978-4-7986-2235-4	May 30, 2023 (digital)	978-1-7183-3440-3
22	September 19, 2020	978-4-7986-2299-6	August 28, 2023 (digital)	978-1-7183-3442-7
23	December 22, 2020	978-4-7986-2376-4	March 4, 2024 (digital)	978-1-7183-3444-1
24	March 19, 2021	978-4-7986-2440-2	June 3, 2024 (digital)	978-1-7183-3446-5
25	June 19, 2021	978-4-7986-2512-6	September 2, 2024 (digital)	978-1-7183-3448-9
26	September 18, 2021	978-4-7986-2589-8	December 2, 2024 (digital)	978-1-7183-3450-2
27	May 19, 2022	978-4-7986-2841-7	March 10, 2025 (digital)	978-1-7183-3452-6
28	August 19, 2022	978-4-7986-2897-4	May 29, 2025 (digital)	978-1-7183-3454-0
29	January 19, 2023	978-4-7986-3000-7	August 7, 2025 (digital)	978-1-7183-3456-4
30	May 19, 2023	978-4-7986-3183-7	October 8, 2025 (digital)	978-1-7183-3458-8
31	September 19, 2023	978-4-7986-3275-9	December 15, 2025 (digital)	978-1-7183-3460-1
32	January 19, 2024	978-4-7986-3388-6	February 26, 2026 (digital)	978-1-7183-3462-5
33	May 17, 2024	978-4-7986-3512-5	May 4, 2026 (digital)	978-1-7183-3464-9
34	September 19, 2024	978-4-7986-3616-0	July 13, 2026 (digital)	978-1-7183-3466-3
35	February 19, 2025	978-4-7986-3758-7	September 24, 2026 (digital)	978-1-7183-3468-7
36	June 19, 2025 (digital)	—	November 30, 2026 (digital)	978-1-7183-3470-0
37	December 19, 2025 (digital)	—	—	—
38	June 19, 2026 (digital)	—	—	—

=== Manga ===
The series was adapted into a manga series by Kochimo and published by Hobby Japan, with fourteen tankōbon volumes released as of June 2026. The manga is also licensed by J-Novel Club. As of December 2025, twelve English volumes have been published.

No.	Original release date	Original ISBN	English release date	English ISBN
1	May 26, 2018	978-4-7986-1700-8	February 12, 2020 (digital)	978-1-7183-4830-1
2	January 26, 2019	978-4-7986-1850-0	April 29, 2020 (digital)	978-1-7183-4831-8
3	November 27, 2019	978-4-7986-2055-8	July 1, 2020 (digital)	978-1-7183-4832-5
4	June 27, 2020	978-4-7986-2240-8	January 27, 2021 (digital)	978-1-7183-4833-2
5	February 1, 2021	978-4-7986-2412-9	September 22, 2021 (digital)	978-1-7183-4834-9
6	August 2, 2021	978-4-7986-2559-1	January 12, 2022 (digital)	978-1-7183-4835-6
7	December 28, 2022	978-4-7986-2651-2	September 13, 2023 (digital)	978-1-7183-4836-3
8	May 1, 2023	978-4-7986-3103-5	February 28, 2024 (digital)	978-1-7183-4837-0
9	November 1, 2023	978-4-7986-3338-1	June 5, 2024 (digital)	978-1-7183-4838-7
10	May 1, 2024	978-4-7986-3467-8	January 8, 2025 (digital)	978-1-7183-4839-4
11	October 1, 2024	978-4-7986-3640-5	May 21, 2025 (digital)	978-1-7183-4840-0
12	May 1, 2025	978-4-7986-3831-7	December 1, 2025 (digital)	978-1-7183-4841-7
13	December 27, 2025	978-4-7986-3994-9	July 29, 2026 (digital)	978-1-7183-4842-4
14	June 1, 2026	978-4-7986-4198-0	—	—

== Reception ==
Rebecca Silverman of Anime News Network gave the first volume a grade of B−, praising its handling of cultural differences and the quality of the English translation. She wrote: "Cooking with Wild Game isn't the most thrilling of books, but it is setting up to perhaps spend more time on things that aren't excessive amounts of game-preparation... If you enjoy cooking stories, this is an interesting one, even if it has yet to achieve a perfect balance of its story elements."
