= D-Genesis: Three Years after the Dungeons Appeared =

Japanese light novel series

- First light novel volume cover

Dジェネシス ダンジョンが出来て3年 (D Jeneshisu Dungeon ga Dekite 3-nen)
- Genre: Fantasy
- Novel series
- Written by: Tsuranori Kono
- Published by: Shōsetsuka ni Narō
- Original run: June 1, 2019 – present
- Light novel
- Written by: Tsuranori Kono
- Illustrated by: ttl
- Published by: Enterbrain
- English publisher: NA: J-Novel Club
- Original run: February 5, 2020 – present
- Volumes: 11 + 1 side story
- Manga
- Written by: Tsuranori Kono
- Illustrated by: Miya Taira
- Published by: Kadokawa Shoten
- English publisher: NA: J-Novel Club
- Imprint: Kadokawa Comics A
- Magazine: Comp Ace
- Original run: August 26, 2020 – present
- Volumes: 9

D-Genesis: Three Years after the Dungeons Appeared (Dジェネシス ダンジョンが出来て3年, D Jeneshisu Dungeon ga Dekite 3-nen) is a Japanese light novel series written by Tsuranori Kono and illustrated by ttl. It began serialization on the user-generated novel publishing website Shōsetsuka ni Narō in June 2019. It was later acquired by Enterbrain who began publishing it in February 2020. A manga adaptation illustrated by Miya Taira began serialization in Kadokawa Shoten's seinen manga magazine Comp Ace in August 2020.

== Media ==
=== Light novel ===
Written by Tsuranori Kono, D-Genesis: Three Years after the Dungeons Appeared began serialization on the user-generated novel publishing website Shōsetsuka ni Narō on June 1, 2019. It was later acquired by Enterbrain who began releasing it with illustrations by ttl on February 5, 2020. Eleven volumes and a side story volume have been released as of June 2026. The light novels are licensed in English by J-Novel Club. During their panel at Anime Expo 2026, J-Novel Club announced that a print version would be released in February 2027.

| No. | Original release date | Original ISBN | North American release date | North American ISBN |
|---|---|---|---|---|
| 1 | February 5, 2020 | 978-4-04-736017-4 | July 7, 2022 (digital); February 23, 2027 (print) | 978-1-71-835140-0 (digital); 978-1-71-832930-0 (print) |
| 2 | August 5, 2020 | 978-4-04-736175-1 | October 20, 2022 | 978-1-71-835142-4 |
| 3 | January 26, 2021 | 978-4-04-736453-0 | March 9, 2023 | 978-1-71-835144-8 |
| 4 | July 5, 2021 | 978-4-04-736649-7 | September 22, 2023 | 978-1-71-835146-2 |
| 5 | November 26, 2021 | 978-4-04-736809-5 | January 26, 2024 | 978-1-71-835148-6 |
| 6 | June 30, 2022 | 978-4-04-737064-7 | June 17, 2024 | 978-1-71-835150-9 |
| 7 | February 28, 2023 | 978-4-04-737302-0 | October 24, 2024 | 978-1-71-835152-3 |
| 8 | October 30, 2023 | 978-4-04-737548-2 | March 11, 2025 | 978-1-71-835154-7 |
| 9 | July 30, 2024 | 978-4-04-737993-0 | August 1, 2025 | 978-1-71-835156-1 |
| SS | October 30, 2024 | 978-4-04-738070-7 | December 9, 2025 | 978-1-71-835158-5 |
| 10 | June 30, 2025 | 978-4-04-738455-2; 978-4-04-738463-7 (SE) | September 17, 2026 | 978-1-71-835160-8 |
| 11 | June 30, 2026 | 978-4-04-500143-7 | — | — |

=== Manga ===
A manga adaptation illustrated by Miya Taira began serialization in Kadokawa Shoten's seinen manga magazine Comp Ace on August 26, 2020. The manga's chapters have been collected into nine tankōbon volumes as of October 2026. The manga adaptation is also licensed in English by J-Novel Club.

| No. | Original release date | Original ISBN | North American release date | North American ISBN |
|---|---|---|---|---|
| 1 | March 25, 2021 | 978-4-04-111191-8 | December 13, 2023 | 978-1-71-833230-0 |
| 2 | November 26, 2021 | 978-4-04-112011-8 | April 3, 2024 | 978-1-71-833231-7 |
| 3 | September 26, 2022 | 978-4-04-112849-7 | July 24, 2024 | 978-1-71-833232-4 |
| 4 | April 26, 2023 | 978-4-04-113608-9 | October 2, 2024 | 978-1-71-833233-1 |
| 5 | December 26, 2023 | 978-4-04-114457-2 | November 27, 2024 | 978-1-71-833234-8 |
| 6 | August 26, 2024 | 978-4-04-115213-3 | August 13, 2025 | 978-1-71-833235-5 |
| 7 | March 25, 2025 | 978-4-04-115860-9 | January 7, 2026 | 978-1-71-833236-2 |
| 8 | November 26, 2025 | 978-4-04-116741-0 | July 8, 2026 | 978-1-71-833237-9 |
| 9 | October 23, 2026 | 978-4-04-117684-9 | — | — |
