= Fired? But I Maintain All the Software! =

Japanese light novel series

- First light novel volume cover

え、社内システム全てワンオペしている私を解雇ですか？ (E, Shanai Shisutemu Subete Wanope Shiteiru Watashi wo Kaiko desu ka?)
- Genre: Comedy drama; Slice of life
- Novel series
- Written by: Yuki Kashirome
- Published by: Shōsetsuka ni Narō; (November 17, 2020 – July 24, 2022); Kakuyomu; (November 23, 2020 – present)
- Original run: November 17, 2020 – present
- Light novel
- Written by: Yuki Kashirome
- Illustrated by: Icchi
- Published by: Shufu to Seikatsu Sha
- English publisher: NA: J-Novel Club
- Imprint: PASH! Books
- Original run: May 7, 2021 – present
- Volumes: 4
- Manga
- Written by: Yuki Kashirome
- Illustrated by: Io
- Published by: Shufu to Seikatsu Sha
- English publisher: NA: J-Novel Club
- Imprint: PASH! Comics
- Magazine: Comic PASH!
- Original run: August 2, 2022 – present
- Volumes: 5
- Anime television series

Fired? But I Maintain All the Software! (Japanese: え、社内システム全てワンオペしている私を解雇ですか？, Hepburn: E, Shanai Shisutemu Subete Wanope Shiteiru Watashi o Kaiko desu ka?) is a Japanese light novel series written by Yuki Kashirome and illustrated by Icchi. It was originally serialized as a web novel on Shōsetsuka ni Narō from November 2020 to July 2022. It was later acquired by Shufu to Seikatsu Sha who began publishing it under their PASH! Books imprint in May 2021. A manga adaptation illustrated by Io began serialization on Shufu to Seikatsu Sha's Comic PASH! website in August 2022. An anime television series adaptation has been announced.

== Synopsis ==
Ai Sato is the only engineer in her company that maintains the internal systems. After the company changes their president, she gets laid off. Depressed, Ai reunites with her childhood friend Kenta Suzuki, and he offers her a place at his coding school startup, to which Ai accepts and becomes a lecturer.

== Media ==
=== Light novel ===
Written by Yuki Kashirome, Fired? But I Maintain All the Software! was originally serialized as a web novel on Shōsetsuka ni Narō from November 17, 2020, to July 24, 2022. It had continued irregular serialization on Kadokawa Corporation's Kakuyomu website. It was later acquired by Shufu to Seikatsu Sha who began publishing it with illustrations by Icchi under their PASH! Books light novel imprint on May 7, 2021. Four volumes have been released as of March 7, 2025.

In February 2026, J-Novel Club announced that they had licensed the series for English publication.

No.	Original release date	Original ISBN	North American release date	North American ISBN
1	May 7, 2021	978-4-391-15604-1	May 15, 2026	978-1-718-35692-4
1. Chapter 0: "A Sudden Dismissal"; 2. Interlude: "Future Plans Written in Void"; 3. Chapter 1: "No More Multitasking"; 4. Interlude: "An Omen of Collapse"; 5. Chapter 2: "Gender Doesn't Matter!"; 6. Interlude: "A Brilliant Engineer"; 7. Chapter 3: "The "Just Try Harder" Argument Is So Outdated!"; 8. Interlude: "Grudge"; 9. Chapter 4: "To Each Their Own "Hello, World""; 10. Interlude: "Final Turning Point"; 11. Final Chapter: "Beyond a Pipe Dream"; Extra: "Why She Began Cosplaying"
2	August 5, 2022	978-4-391-15807-6	August 12, 2026	978-1-718-35694-8
1. Chapter 0: "An Unprecedented Press Conference"; 2. Chapter 1: "Dream Survey"; 3. Chapter 2: "An Adult's Dream"; 4. Chapter 3: "The Dream's End"; 5. Chapter 4: "The Next Stage"; 6. Chapter 5: "A Request from My Idol"; 7. Chapter 6: "A Child's Dream"; 8. Epilogue; Extra: "Oasis"
3	January 4, 2024	978-4-391-16161-8	November 6, 2026	978-1-718-35696-2
1. Chapter 7: "A Brief Squabble"; 2. Chapter 8: "A New World"; 3. Chapter 9: "Virtual Idol"; 4. Interlude: "Matsuri Komari Waits"; 5. Chapter 10: "Matsuri Komari's Secret"; 6. Interlude: "Best in the World"; 7. Chapter 11: "Starting Line"; 8. Interlude: "Unamused"; 9. Chapter 12: "Preparing for the Concert"; 10. Interlude: "Scheming"; 11. Final Chapter: "My Song"; Extra: "Matsuri's First Concert"
4	March 7, 2025	978-4-391-16437-4	—	—

=== Manga ===
A manga adaptation illustrated by Io began serialization on Shufu to Seikatsu Sha's Comic PASH! website on August 2, 2022. The manga's chapters have been collected in five tankōbon volumes as of June 2026.

During their panel at Anime NYC 2025, J-Novel Club announced that they had licensed the manga for English publication.

No.	Original release date	Original ISBN	North American release date	North American ISBN
1	May 2, 2023	978-4-391-15950-9	November 5, 2025	978-1-718-39531-2
Chapters 1–8; Extra
2	January 4, 2024	978-4-391-16156-4	January 14, 2026	978-1-718-39532-9
Chapters 9–16; Extra
3	August 2, 2024	978-4-391-16245-5	April 29, 2026	978-1-718-39533-6
Chapters 17–23; Extra
4	May 2, 2025	978-4-391-16438-1	September 19, 2026	978-1-718-39534-3
Chapters 24–32; Extra
5	June 5, 2026	978-4-391-16787-0	—	—

=== Anime ===
An anime television series adaptation was announced on June 3, 2026.

== Reception ==
The manga adaptation was a prize winner in the Next Impact Comic category at the 2nd Rakuten Kobo E-book Manga Awards.
