= Record of Wortenia War =

Japanese light novel series

- Cover of the first light novel volume

ウォルテニア戦記 (Wortenia Senki)
- Genre: Isekai, Fantasy
- Novel series
- Written by: Ryouta Hori
- Published by: Shōsetsuka ni Narō
- Original run: October 6, 2009 – July 16, 2021
- Light novel
- Written by: Ryouta Hori
- Illustrated by: bob
- Published by: Hobby Japan
- English publisher: NA: J-Novel Club
- Imprint: HJ Novels
- Original run: September 19, 2015 – present
- Volumes: 32
- Manga
- Written by: Yukari Yagi
- Published by: Hobby Japan
- English publisher: NA: J-Novel Club
- Imprint: HJ Comics
- Magazine: Comic Fire
- Original run: 2016 – present
- Volumes: 12

Record of Wortenia War (ウォルテニア戦記, Wortenia Senki) is a Japanese light novel series written by Ryouta Hori and illustrated by bob. It began serialization online in 2009 on the user-generated novel publishing website Shōsetsuka ni Narō. It was acquired by Hobby Japan, who published the first light novel volume in October 2015 under their HJ Novels imprint. A manga adaptation with art by Yukari Yagi has been serialized online via Hobby Japan's Comic Fire website since 2016. Both the light novel and manga have been licensed in North America by J-Novel Club.

== Plot ==
A high school martial artist named Ryoma Mikoshiba is summoned to another world by the warmongering O'ltormea Empire, which regularly summons people and enslaves them with mind control and abuse, ruthlessly discarding anyone who is weak. In this world, whenever someone kills another, the life force of the victim is absorbed, making the killer stronger. Sensing that the royal court that summoned him is malevolent, he fights his way out. During his escape, he rescues the twin girls Sara and Laura from slavery and they pledge loyalty to him. He starts building his own nation to fight against tyranny.

== Media ==
=== Light novels ===
Hobby Japan published the first light novel volume in print with illustrations by bob in September 2015. As of February 2026, thirty-two volumes have been published. The light novel is licensed in North America by J-Novel Club.

==== Volumes ====
No.	Original release date	Original ISBN	English release date	English ISBN
1	September 19, 2015	978-4-79861-076-4	July 13, 2019	978-1-71834-550-8
Prologue; Chapter 1: Summoning; Chapter 2: Escape; Chapter 3: Resolve; Chapter 4: The Hunter and the Hunted; Epilogue
2	December 22, 2015	978-4-79861-148-8	September 21, 2019	978-1-71834-552-2
Prologue; Chapter 1: Assailant; Chapter 2: Entangled Plots; Chapter 3: The Ivory Goddess of War; Chapter 4: Proof of Strength; Epilogue
3	March 24, 2016	978-4-79861-199-0	November 29, 2019	978-1-71834-554-6
Prologue; Chapter 1: Spanner in the Works; Chapter 2: Opening Hostilities; Chapter 3: The Assassin; Chapter 4: Those Who Struggle; Epilogue
4	July 22, 2016	978-4-79861-245-4	January 27, 2020	978-1-71834-556-0
Prologue; Chapter 1: Inescapable Sin; Chapter 2: An Unexpected Messenger; Chapter 3: Clash; Chapter 4: Helena's Revenge; Chapter 5: A New Battlefield; Epilogue
5	November 24, 2016	978-4-79861-330-7	March 21, 2020	978-1-71834-558-4
Prologue; Chapter 1: The Beginning of the Flight; Chapter 2: Heading North; Chapter 3: Leader of the North; Chapter 4: The Christof Company; Chapter 5: The Oppressed; Epilogue
6	March 23, 2017	978-4-79861-414-4	May 31, 2020	978-1-71834-560-7
Prologue; Chapter 1: Negotiations; Chapter 2: In Search of New Power; Chapter 3: The Invasion of the East; Chapter 4: To The Peninsula; Chapter 5: Merciless Hellfire; Epilogue
7	July 22, 2017	978-4-79861-490-8	August 2, 2020	978-1-71834-562-1
Prologue; Chapter 1: The Clouds of War Brew; Chapter 2: A Messenger From a Neighboring Country; Chapter 3: The Gap Between Ideals and Reality; Chapter 4: To the West; Chapter 5: Proving One's Power; Epilogue
8	November 22, 2017	978-4-79861-568-4	October 11, 2020	978-1-71834-564-5
Prologue; Chapter 1: Those Who Writhe in the Shadows; Chapter 2: A Restless Heart; Chapter 3: The Vixen of the North; Chapter 4: The Battle of the Ushas Basin; Chapter 5: The Church of Meneos; Epilogue
9	March 22, 2018	978-4-79861-654-4	January 10, 2021	978-1-71834-566-9
Prologue; Chapter 1: A Chance Meeting with an Old Friend; Chapter 2: The First Obstacle; Chapter 3: The Second Obstacle; Chapter 4: The Hour of Harvest; Chapter 5: Two Side of the Coin; Epilogue
10	July 21, 2018	978-4-79861-729-9	May 17, 2021	978-1-71834-568-3
Prologue; Chapter 1: Akimitsu Kuze; Chapter 2: Julianus I's Advice; Chapter 3: The Hero's Homecoming; Chapter 4: The Shadow's Presence; Chapter 5: Incessant Plots; Epilogue
11	November 22, 2018	978-4-79861-806-7	August 25, 2021	978-1-71834-570-6
Prologue; Chapter 1: A New War Beckons; Chapter 2: The Ten House's of the North; Chapter 3: The Azure Sky Nimbus; Chapter 4: The Twin Blades; Chapter 5: Spontaneous Discharge; Epilogue
12	March 22, 2019	978-4-79861-886-9	September 6, 2021	978-1-71834-572-0
Prologue; Chapter 1: The Dark Abyss; Chapter 2: Kikoku; Chapter 3: The Oppressor and the Oppressed; Chapter 4: The Night Before the War; Chapter 5: The Beast's Howl; Epilogue
13	July 23, 2019	978-4-79861-964-4	November 30, 2021	978-1-71834-574-4
Prologue; Chapter 1: The Crimson Lioness and the Twin Blades; Chapter 2: For a Better Tomorrow; Chapter 3: Swarm of Locusts; Chapter 4: The City of Galatia; Epilogue
14	November 22, 2019	978-4-79862-050-3	February 14, 2022	978-1-71834-576-8
Prologue; Chapter 1: Count Winzer's Estate; Chapter 2: Betrayal and Friendship; Chapter 3: A Warrior's Way of Life; Chapter 4: The House of Lords; Epilogue
15	March 21, 2020	978-4-79862-151-7	July 4, 2022	978-1-71834-578-2
Prologue; Chapter 1: Tarnished Pride; Chapter 2: A Captive Warrior; Chapter 3: Where the Future is Headed; Chapter 4: Master of the Twin Blades; Epilogue
16	July 22, 2020	978-4-79862-249-1	September 19, 2022	978-1-71834-580-5
Prologue; Chapter 1: Invisible Malice; Chapter 2: Of Kings and Overlords; Chapter 3: The Feast Begins; Chapter 4: A Deadly Trap; Epilogue
17	November 21, 2020	978-4-79862-350-4	December 6, 2022	978-1-71834-582-9
Prologue; Chapter 1: The Opening Act of the Farce; Chapter 2: Verbal Dogfight; Chapter 3: The Day of Separation; Chapter 4: The Battle of the Cannat Plains; Epilogue
18	March 19, 2021	978-4-79862-441-9	March 20, 2023	978-1-71834-584-3
Prologue; Chapter 1: Battlefield Investigation; Chapter 2: Deceivers' Den; Chapter 3: Bonds of Blood; Chapter 4: The Heir to One's Will; Epilogue
19	July 19, 2021	978-4-79862-551-5	June 5, 2023	978-1-71834-586-7
Prologue; Chapter 1: A Wavering Heart; Chapter 2: The Weapon that is the Weak; Chapter 3: The Empty Fort Scheme; Chapter 4: The Tiger Cage Pass; Epilogue
20	November 19, 2021	978-4-79862-671-0	September 1, 2023	978-1-71834-588-1
Prologue; Chapter 1: The Conqueror's Kindness; Chapter 2: The Southern Battlefield; Chapter 3: A Trap for a Trap; Chapter 4: The End of the Northern Subjugation; Epilogue
21	March 19, 2022	978-4-79862-764-9	October 30, 2023	978-1-71834-590-4
Prologue; Chapter 1: Those Who Wander in Search of Light; Chapter 2: The Delivered Letter; Chapter 3: Ceasefire Negotiations; Chapter 4: Those Who Know the Mikoshiba Ways; Epilogue
22	July 19, 2022	978-4-79862-872-1	January 12, 2024	978-1-71834-592-8
Prologue; Chapter 1: The Battle for the Capital; Chapter 2: The Moment Suspicion Buds; Chapter 3: Castle Invasion; Chapter 4: A New Country; Epilogue
23	November 23, 2022	978-4-79862-998-8	March 13, 2024	978-1-71834-594-2
Prologue; Chapter 1: False Peace; Chapter 2: Hunter and Prey; Chapter 3: A Justified Killing; Chapter 4: Fog of War; Epilogue
24	March 20, 2023	978-4-79863-140-0	May 20, 2024	978-1-71834-596-6
Prologue; Chapter 1: A Poisonous Gathering; Chapter 2: Those Who Fan the Flames; Chapter 3: Under the Flag; Chapter 4: The Bearer of Bad News; Epilogue
25	July 19, 2023	978-4-79863-234-6	August 9, 2024	978-1-71834-598-0
Prologue; Chapter 1: Collaboration of Shadows; Chapter 2: The Crimson Lion Roars; Chapter 3: A Gloomy Storm; Chapter 4: The Two-Headed Snake Scowls; Epilogue
26	December 19, 2023	978-4-79863-347-3	November 1, 2024	978-1-71834-666-6
Prologue; Chapter 1: Delivered Cargo; Chapter 2: Lurking Danger; Chapter 3: Endesia's Revolution; Chapter 4: The Thunderous Warlord; Epilogue
27	June 19, 2024	978-4-79863-507-1	January 17, 2025	978-1-71834-668-0
Prologue; Chapter 1: The Price of Pride; Chapter 2: The Poison Known as Doubt; Chapter 3: The Embers of War; Chapter 4: The Next Step; Epilogue
28	August 20, 2024	978-4-79863-601-6	May 9, 2025	978-1-71834-670-3
Prologue; Chapter 1: The Sleeping Princess Awakens; Chapter 2: A New Stage; Chapter 3: The Glint of Bardiche; Chapter 4: The Growl of an Iron Staff; Epilogue
29	December 19, 2024	978-4-79863-703-7	July 9, 2025	978-1-71832-274-5
Prologue; Chapter 1: Those in the Shadows; Chapter 2: Nelcius's Proposal; Chapter 3: The Dawn of the Purge; Chapter 4: Daijin's Doubt; Epilogue
30	May 19, 2025	978-4-79863-850-8	November 19, 2025	978-1-71832-276-9
Prologue; Chapter 1: A Thorn to the Heart; Chapter 2: Burning Hate; Chapter 3: The Self-Proclaimed "Tsuchigomo"; Chapter 4: The Future at Stake; Epilogue
31	August 19, 2025	978-4-79863-928-4	December 18, 2026	978-1-71832-278-3
32	February 19, 2026	978-4-79864-066-2	—	—
33	September 19, 2026	978-4-79864-224-6	—	—

=== Manga ===
The light novel series was adapted into a manga series by Yukari Yagi and published by Hobby Japan. As of December 2021, the individual chapters have been collected into twelve tankōbon volumes. The manga is also licensed by J-Novel Club.

==== Volumes ====
No.	Original release date	Original ISBN	English release date	English ISBN
1	April 27, 2017	978-4-79861-442-7	December 2, 2020	978-1-71830-720-9
Chapter 1: Summoning; Chapter 2: Escape; Chapter 3: On the Run; Chapter 4: Resolve; Chapter 5: Resolve 2; Side Story
2	November 27, 2017	978-4-79861-572-1	May 5, 2021	978-1-71830-721-6
Chapter 6: Resolve 3; Chapter 7: The Hunter and the Hunted; Chapter 8: The Hunter and the Hunted 2; Chapter 9: The Way Back Home; Chapter 10: The Assailant; Side Story
3	April 27, 2018	978-4-79861-687-2	July 14, 2021	978-1-71830-722-3
Chapter 11: The Enemy's Identity; Chapter 12: The Scheme; Chapter 13: Entangled Plots; Chapter 14: The Ivory Goddess of War; Chapter 15: Proof of Strength
4	December 27, 2018	978-4-79861-810-4	September 29, 2021	978-1-71830-723-0
Chapter 16: Spanner in the Works; Chapter 17: The Traitor's Name; Chapter 18: Opening Hostilities; Chapter 19: The Assassin; Chapter 20: Those Who Struggle; Side Story
5	September 27, 2019	978-4-79862-006-0	November 3, 2021	978-1-71830-724-7
Chapter 21: Negotiations; Chapter 22: Assassin; Chapter 23: Class; Chapter 24: Helena's Revenge; Chapter 25: A New Battlefield
6	June 27, 2020	978-4-79862-239-2	January 26, 2022	978-1-71830-725-4
Chapter 26: Northward; Chapter 27: Governor of the North; Chapter 28: Governor of the North Part 2; Chapter 29: The Christof Company; Chapter 30: The Oppressed; Side Story
7	March 1, 2021	978-4-79862-428-0	April 13, 2022	978-1-71830-726-1
Chapter 31: The Oppressed – Part 2; Chapter 32: Negotiations; Chapter 33: Invading the East; Chapter 34: To the Peninsula; Chapter 35: Ruthless Hellfire
8	December 28, 2021	978-4-79862-654-3	September 28, 2022	978-1-71830-727-8
Chapter 36: Ruthless Hellfire Part 2; Chapter 37: The Creeping Shadows of War; Chapter 38: The One Who Enables Victory; Chapter 39: To the West; Chapter 40: Proof of Strength; Side Story
9	September 29, 2022	978-4-79862-961-2	March 15, 2023	978-1-71830-728-5
Chapter 41: Proof of Strength – Part 2; Chapter 42: Vixen of the North; Chapter 43: Hurdle Part 1; Chapter 44: Hurdle Part 2; Chapter 45: An Encounter with an Old Friend
10	November 1, 2023	978-4-79863-155-4	July 24, 2024	978-1-71830-729-2
Chapter 46: An Encounter with an Old Friend – Part 2; Chapter 47: The Hero Returns; Chapter 48: Endless Machinations; Chapter 49: An Invitation to a New Battle; Chapter 50: Ten Houses of the North and Azure Sky Nimbus
11	December 2, 2024	978-4-79863-520-0	October 1, 2025	978-1-71833-921-7
Chapter 51: The Twin Blades; Chapter 52: The Abyss of Darkness; Chapter 53: The Night Before the War; Chapter 54: The Roar of the Wicked Beast; Chapter 55: The Twin Blades and Crimson Lioness – Part 1
12	March 2, 2026	978-4-79863-911-6	—	—
