= Der Werwolf: The Annals of Veight =

Japanese light novel series

- First light novel volume cover

人狼への転生、魔王の副官 (Jinrō e no Tensei, Maō no Fukukan)
- Genre: Isekai, fantasy
- Novel series
- Written by: Hyougetsu
- Published by: Shōsetsuka ni Narō
- Original run: July 22, 2015 – June 30, 2017
- Light novel
- Written by: Hyougetsu
- Illustrated by: Teshima Nari
- Published by: Earth Star Entertainment (1–13); Square Enix (14–16)
- English publisher: NA: J-Novel Club
- Imprint: Earth Star Novel (1–13); SQEX Novel (14–16)
- Original run: November 14, 2015 – January 6, 2024
- Volumes: 16
- Manga
- Written by: Hyougetsu
- Illustrated by: Yuuchi Kosumi
- Published by: Earth Star Entertainment
- English publisher: NA: J-Novel Club
- Magazine: Comic Earth Star
- Original run: October 7, 2016 – November 23, 2023
- Volumes: 11

Der Werwolf: The Annals of Veight (人狼への転生、魔王の副官, Jinrō e no Tensei, Maō no Fukukan) is a Japanese light novel series written by Hyougetsu and illustrated by Teshima Nari. A manga adaptation by Yuuchi Kosumi was serialized from October 2016 to November 2023. The light novel and manga are licensed in North America by J-Novel Club.

== Plot ==
Veight is a werewolf who was reincarnated from an ordinary person on Earth. He leads the Demon Lord's third regiment as his Vice-Commander. After conquering the trading city of Ryunheit, Veight has to govern it, which now has a mixed population of humans and demons, using his understanding of humans from his previous life.

== Media ==
=== Light novel ===
In July 2018, J-Novel Club announced it had licensed the light novel. In November 2020, Der Werwolf was announced as one of the three titles previously published by Earth Star Entertainment that would be included in Square Enix's new light novel label SQEX Novel, the others being Didn't I Say to Make My Abilities Average in the Next Life?! and Reincarnated as a Dragon Hatchling.

No.	Original release date	Original ISBN	English release date	English ISBN
1	November 14, 2015	978-4-8030-0825-8	September 13, 2018	978-1-7183-3100-6
2	February 2, 2016	978-4-8030-0873-9	November 28, 2018	978-1-7183-3102-0
3	April 15, 2016	978-4-8030-0911-8	March 2, 2019	978-1-7183-3104-4
4	July 15, 2016	978-4-8030-0946-0	May 28, 2019	978-1-7183-3106-8
5	November 15, 2016	978-4-8030-0967-5	August 27, 2019	978-1-7183-3108-2
6	April 15, 2017	978-4-8030-1034-3	January 7, 2020	978-1-7183-3110-5
7	August 17, 2017	978-4-8030-1096-1	April 21, 2020	978-1-7183-3112-9
8	December 15, 2017	978-4-8030-1140-1	August 2, 2020	978-1-7183-3114-3
9	May 16, 2018	978-4-8030-1183-8	October 28, 2020	978-1-7183-3116-7
10	August 16, 2018	978-4-8030-1221-7	January 12, 2021	978-1-7183-3118-1
11	January 17, 2019	978-4-8030-1264-4	April 15, 2021	978-1-7183-3120-4
12	June 15, 2019	978-4-8030-1297-2	September 9, 2021	978-1-7183-3122-8
13	December 14, 2019	978-4-8030-1374-0	December 20, 2021	978-1-7183-3124-2
14	March 5, 2021	978-4-7575-7064-1	July 28, 2022	978-1-7183-3126-6
15	December 7, 2021	978-4-7575-7620-9	December 15, 2022	978-1-7183-3128-0
16	January 6, 2024	978-4-7575-8996-4	January 28, 2025	978-1-7183-3130-3

=== Manga ===
J-Novel Club licensed the manga, titled Der Werwolf: The Annals of Veight ~Origins~, in November 2020. The final volume was published in February 2024.

No.	Original release date	Original ISBN	English release date	English ISBN
1	April 15, 2017	978-4-8030-1010-7	June 23, 2021	978-1-7183-3770-1
2	October 15, 2017	978-4-8030-1118-0	August 24, 2021	978-1-7183-3771-8
3	August 10, 2018	978-4-8030-1216-3	November 1, 2021	978-1-7183-3772-5
4	June 12, 2019	978-4-8030-1300-9	November 1, 2021	978-1-7183-3773-2
5	February 13, 2020	978-4-8030-1382-5	February 9, 2022	978-1-7183-3774-9
6	October 12, 2020	978-4-8030-1459-4	May 19, 2022	978-1-7183-3775-6
7	May 12, 2021	978-4-8030-1519-5	June 1, 2022	978-1-7183-3776-3
8	January 12, 2022	978-4-8030-1602-4	December 7, 2022	978-1-7183-3777-0
9	September 12, 2022	978-4-8030-1688-8	May 17, 2023	978-1-7183-3778-7
10	May 12, 2023	978-4-8030-1782-3	March 13, 2024	978-1-7183-3779-4
11	February 9, 2024	978-4-8030-1905-6	September 24, 2025	978-1-7183-3780-0
