= J-Novel Club =

American publishing company

- Status: Active
- Founded: 2016; 10 years ago
- Founder: Sam Pinansky
- Country of origin: United States
- Headquarters location: San Antonio, Texas
- Distribution: Hachette Book Group (North America); Diamond Book Distributors (International)
- Publication types: Books (digital and print)
- Imprints: J-Novel Club; J-Novel Heart; J-Novel Knight; J-Novel Pulp; J-Novel Club Nina
- Owner: Kadokawa Corporation
- Official website: j-novel.club

J-Novel Club is a publishing company specializing in the translation of Japanese light novels into English. It streams light novels and manga in regular installments before publishing finalized e-books. As of August 2021, J-Novel Club has licensed over 150 light novel and manga series and have published more than 800 e-books. It has licensed titles from many Japanese publishers, including Hobby Japan, Overlap, Kodansha, Drecom, Earth Star Entertainment, Kadokawa Corporation, Micro Magazine, Shufunotomo, and Softbank Creative. It was acquired by Kadokawa Corporation on April 28, 2021.

== History ==
After coming to the conclusion that "there was a whole universe of content out there in Japan that's hardly available in the west at all," Sam Pinansky began working on the business model for J-Novel Club in 2015 and "took inspiration from what the fans had started to do on their own, as well as the more traditional models for book publishing." J-Novel Club's overall purpose was "to create and grow a worldwide market for Japanese light novels translated into English." The original name for the project was "K-Novel" because "kei" is Japanese for "light" (as in the K from K-On!), but before launch the "K" was changed to "J" (for Japanese) to avoid confusion with Korean novels. "Club" was added when it was noticed that the .club top-level domain name was available.

J-Novel Club was founded in 2016 by Sam Pinansky and announced they would release light novels in weekly installments for their members before releasing the finalized books on e-book format. It launched with the titles Occultic;Nine, Brave Chronicle: The Ruinmaker, My Big Sister Lives in a Fantasy World, and My Little Sister Can Read Kanji. Shortly after they announced two more light novels: Grimgar of Fantasy and Ash and I Saved Too Many Girls and Caused the Apocalypse.

On January 19, 2017, J-Novel Club announced it would be collaborating with manga and light novel localization company Seven Seas Entertainment, who would publish print editions of two of J-Novel Club's light novels: Grimgar of Fantasy and Ash and Occultic;Nine. On July 3, 2017, Seven Seas announced they would be publishing print editions of two more J-Novel Club light novels: Arifureta: From Commonplace to World's Strongest and Clockwork Planet.

On July 5, 2018, J-Novel Club announced it would be printing physical versions of some of its light novel series. After launching its print line with In Another World With My Smartphone, as of August 2021, J-Novel Club has 25 light novel and manga series in print.

On November 20, 2018, J-Novel Club launched an online manga reader with five launch titles: A Very Fairy Apartment, Seirei Gensouki: Spirit Chronicles, Infinite Dendrogram, How a Realist Hero Rebuilt the Kingdom, and Ascendance of a Bookworm.

On October 7, 2019, J-Novel Club launched a Kickstarter project for Invaders of the Rokujouma!? print edition and successfully funded it with more than $100,000 over its initial goal.

On November 16, 2019, J-Novel Club announced the new J-Novel Heart imprint focusing on shojo titles.

On April 2, 2021, the J-Novel Pulp imprint was announced with the titles John Sinclair: Demon Hunter, Jessica Bannister, and Perry Rhodan NEO. This imprint focuses on translating and publishing German-language pulp fiction into English.

On April 28, 2021, Kadokawa Corporation announced they acquired the company.

During their panel at Anime NYC 2022, J-Novel Club announced a new collaboration with Yen Press to publish their titles in print. The titles announced for a print release were Hell Mode light novel, The Misfit of Demon King Academy light novel, and the My Instant Death Ability Is So Overpowered, No One in This Other World Stands a Chance Against Me! light novel and manga adaptation. J-Novel Club also announced that it is partnering with RBMedia and Podium to produce audiobook versions of their titles.

On October 15, 2023, J-Novel Club announced that it is launching a subsidiary called "J-Novel Club Nina" for the European market. It will, at first, launch in French and German languages.

On March 6, 2024, J-Novel Club announced that it had signed a print distribution deal with Hachette Book Group and Diamond Book Distributors for North American and international releases respectively.

On October 25, 2024, J-Novel Club announced that it would launch an imprint for boy's love titles called "J-Novel Knight".

== Titles ==
=== Audiobook titles ===
- Arifureta: From Commonplace to World's Strongest
- Black Summoner
- By the Grace of the Gods
- The Faraway Paladin
- Full Metal Panic!
- Hell Mode
- How a Realist Hero Rebuilt the Kingdom
- In Another World with My Smartphone
- Min-Maxing My TRPG Build in Another World
- My Daughter Left the Nest and Returned an S-Rank Adventurer
- My Quiet Blacksmith Life in Another World
- Reborn to Master the Blade: From Hero-King to Extraordinary Squire
- Slayers

=== Manga titles ===
- 8th Loop for the Win! With Seven Lives' Worth of XP and the Third Princess's Appraisal Skill, My Behemoth and I Are Unstoppable!
- The 100th Time's the Charm: She Was Executed 99 Times, So How Did She Unlock "Super Love" Mode?!
- Accidentally in Love: The Witch, the Knight, and the Love Potion Slipup
- Animeta!
- An Archdemon's Dilemma: How to Love Your Elf Bride
- An Archdemon's (Friends's) Dilemma: How to Love a Crybaby Knight
- Ascendance of a Bookworm
- The Banished Former Hero Lives as He Pleases
- Bibliophile Princess
- The Brilliant Healer's New Life in the Shadows
- Butareba: The Story of a Man Turned into a Pig
- Campfire Cooking in Another World with My Absurd Skill
- Campfire Cooking in Another World with My Absurd Skill: Sui's Great Adventure
- A Cave King's Road to Paradise: Climbing to the Top with My Almighty Mining Skills!
- The Conqueror from a Dying Kingdom
- Cooking with Wild Game
- The Coppersmith's Bride
- The Crown of Rutile Quartz
- D-Genesis: Three Years after the Dungeons Appeared
- Death's Daughter and the Ebony Blade
- Demon Lord, Retry!
- Der Werwolf: The Annals of Veight -Origins-
- Did I Seriously Just Get Reincarnated as My Gag Character?!
- Discommunication
- Doll-Kara
- Dragon Daddy Diaries: A Girl Grows to Greatness
- Duchess in the Attic
- The Emperor's Lady-in-Waiting Is Wanted as a Bride
- Endo and Kobayashi Live! The Latest on Tsundere Villainess Lieselotte
- The Eternal Fool's Words of Wisdom: A Pawsitively Fantastic Adventure
- Even Exiled, She's Still the Beloved Saint! St. Evelyn's Weird and Wonderful Friends
- The Faraway Paladin
- The Fearsome Witch Teaches in Another World: Ms. Aoi's Lesson Plans
- Fired? But I Maintain All the Software!
- Flung into a New World? Time to Lift the 200-Year Curse!
- Forget Being the Villainess, I Want to be an Adventurer!
- From Villainess to Healer: I Know the Cheat to Change My Fate
- The Frontier Lord Begins with Zero Subjects: Tales of Blue Dias and the Onikin Alna
- Fushi no Kami: Rebuilding Civilization Starts with a Village
- Goodbye, Overtime! This Reincarnated Villainess Is Living for Her New Big Brother
- Gushing over Magical Girls
- Hell Mode: The Hardcore Gamer Dominates in Another World with Garbage Balancing
- Housekeeping Mage from Another World: Making Your Adventures Feel Like Home!
- How a Realist Hero Rebuilt the Kingdom
- I Love Yuri and I Got Bodyswapped With a Fujoshi!
- I Only Have Six Months to Live, So I'm Gonna Break the Curse with Light Magic or Die Trying
- I Parry Everything: What Do You Mean I'm the Strongest? I'm Not Even an Adventurer Yet!
- I Shall Survive Using Potions!
- I Want to Escape from Princess Lessons
- I'll Never Set Foot in That House Again!
- I'm a Noble on the Brink of Ruin, So I Might as Well Try Mastering Magic
- I'm Capped at Level 1?! Thus Begins My Journey to Become the World's Strongest Badass!
- Imperial Reincarnation I Came, I Saw, I Survived
- Infinite Dendrogram
- The Invincible Little Lady
- The Invincible Summoner Who Crawled Up from Level 1
- Isekai Tensei: Recruited to Another World
- Jeanette the Genius: Defying My Evil Stepmother by Starting a Business with My Ride-or-Die Fiancé!
- Karate Master Isekai
- La Ragazza: Living with Francesca
- Lady Rose Just Wants to Be a Commoner
- A Late Start Tamer's Laid-Back Life
- A Livid Lady's Guide to Getting Even: How I Crushed My Homeland with My Mighty Grimoires
- Looks like a Job for a Maid! The Tales of a Dismissed Supermaid
- The Magic in this Other World is Too Far Behind!
- The Magician Who Rose From Failure
- Mapping: The Trash-Tier Skill That Got Me Into a Top-Tier Party
- Marginal Operation
- The Master of Ragnarok & Blesser of Einherjar
- Mercedes and the Waning Moon: The Dungeoneering Feats of a Discarded Vampire Aristocrat
- Monster and Parent
- My Daughter Left the Nest and Returned an S-Rank Adventurer
- My Death-Defying Dog: Man's Best Friend, World's Best Savior
- My Fiancé Cheated, But a New Love Rings!
- My Instant Death Ability Is So Overpowered, No One in This Other World Stands a Chance Against Me! —AΩ—
- My Quiet Blacksmith Life in Another World
- My Tiny Senpai
- Now I'm a Demon Lord! Happily Ever After with Monster Girls in My Dungeon
- The Oblivious Saint Can't Contain Her Power: Disgraced No Longer, I'm Finding Happiness with the Prince!
- Old Knight, New Post: From Retiree to Her Majesty's Blade
- Only I Know That This World Is a Game
- The Otome Heroine's Fight for Survival
- Oversummoned, Overpowered, and Over It!
- A Pale Moon Reverie
- Peddler in Another World: I Can Go Back to My World Whenever I Want!
- Private Tutor to the Duke's Daughter
- Reborn to Master the Blade: From Hero-King to Extraordinary Squire
- Rebuild World
- Record of Wortenia War
- The Reincarnation of the Strongest Exorcist in Another World
- The Retired Demon of the Maxed-Out Village
- A Royal Rebound: Forget My Ex-Fiancé, I'm Being Pampered by the Prince!
- Safe & Sound in the Arms of an Elite Knight
- The Saga of Lioncourt
- Scooped Up by an S-Rank Adventurer! This White Mage is One Heck of a Healer
- Seirei Gensouki: Spirit Chronicles
- The Skull Dragon's Precious Daughter
- Sometimes Even Reality Is a Lie!
- Sorcerous Stabber Orphen: Reckless Journey
- Sorcerous Stabber Orphen: The Youthful Journey
- Stuck in a Time Loop: When All Else Fails, Be a Villainess
- Sweet Reincarnation
- The Tales of Marielle Clarac
- Tearmoon Empire
- This Alluring Dark Elf Has the Heart of a Middle-Aged Man!
- This Art Club Has a Problem!
- Thompson
- Through the Viewport: Child of a Ruined World
- To Another World... with Land Mines!
- The Troubles of Miss Nicola the Exorcist
- The Unwanted Undead Adventurer
- A Very Fairy Apartment
- Villainess: Reloaded! ~Blowing Away Bad Ends with Modern Weapons~
- The Water Magician
- Welcome to Japan, Ms. Elf!
- A Wild Last Boss Appeared!
- The Wind That Reaches the Ends of the World
- Young Lady Albert Is Courting Disaster
