= The World Bows Down Before My Flames =

Japanese light novel series

- First light novel volume cover

我が焔炎にひれ伏せ世界 (Waga Homura ni Hirefuse Sekai)
- Genre: Comedy, isekai
- Light novel
- Written by: Hiyoko Sumeragi
- Illustrated by: Mika Pikazo
- Published by: Kadokawa Shoten
- English publisher: NA: Yen Press
- Imprint: Kadokawa Sneaker Bunko
- Original run: December 1, 2022 – present
- Volumes: 5
- Manga
- Written by: Hiyoko Sumeragi
- Illustrated by: Koyuki
- Published by: Fujimi Shobo
- Imprint: Dragon Comics Age
- Magazine: Niconico Seiga (Dra Dra Flat)
- Original run: August 10, 2023 – present
- Volumes: 2

The World Bows Down Before My Flames (Japanese: 我が焔炎にひれ伏せ世界, Hepburn: Waga Homura ni Hirefuse Sekai) is a Japanese light novel series written by Hiyoko Sumeragi and illustrated by Mika Pikazo. It began publication under Kadokawa Shoten's Kadokawa Sneaker Bunko light novel imprint in December 2022. A manga adaptation illustrated by Koyuki began serialization on Fujimi Shobo's Niconico Seiga-based Dra Dra Flat website in August 2023.

== Plot ==
Asahi Homura is an ordinary high school student who got reincarnated into another world to defeat a demon lord. Unfortunately, she is forced to deal with the antics of four other reincarnators who are each far from normal—an assassin, a mad scientist, a robot, and a living bioweapon. However, Homura may have to accept that she is not normal either—a pyromaniac with pyrokinesis who enjoys incinerating evildoers. What will happen when this group of over-the-top teenage girls is unleashed onto the world? Will they save it, or burn it all to the ground?

== Characters ==
Asahi Homura (穂村朝日, Homura Asahi)
Commonly referred to as just Homura (ホムラ, Homura), she is a high school student with pyrokinesis who got reincarnated into another world after committing suicide over ostracization due to her powers. Though a bit of a chuunibyou and a lolicon, at first glance, she appears to be the "normal" one of her group. However, she later realizes and accepts that she is actually a pyromaniac who hates injustice and hypocrisy due to how she was mistreated, taking sadistic joy in incinerating evildoers.
Jin (ジン, Jin)
Real name Sakura Karasuma (烏丸桜, Karasuma Sakura), she is a katana-wielding assassin who got reincarnated into another world after being forced to commit seppuku by her clan when she refused to kill innocents. Though seemingly a cold-blooded murderer, she actually derives no joy from killing at all. Having spent her whole life following orders, she finally begins thinking for herself after reincarnating into the other world, eventually realizing that she is a battle junky who enjoys fighting strong opponents.
Saiko (才子, Saiko)
Nicknamed Psycho (サイコ, Saiko), she is a self-professed mad scientist obsessed with b movie monsters. She developed healing magic after being reincarnated into the other world, which she uses in unconventional ways by mutating her enemies into monsters under her command. A rude girl who causes trouble wherever she goes, she is arguably the companion Homura is closest to, though this unfortunately stems from the two constantly arguing with each other.
Proto (プロト, Puroto)
A mechanical being originating from outer space, she was discovered by human scientists and made to attend high school. As a robot, she possesses superhuman strength and endurance, and wields a hammer as her primary weapon. Convinced of her superiority over the "carbon-based life-forms", she is cocky and showoffish with no understanding of human customs.
Tsutsumi (ツツミ, Tsutsumi)
Codename 223, she is a failed bioweapon who got reincarnated into another world after being disposed of. Though deemed a defective product by her creators, she developed biokinesis after some fine-tuning by Saiko. Possessing a child-like appearance and personality, her companions treat her as a little sister-figure, even though she is actually around the same age as them.

== Media ==
=== Light novel ===
Written by Hiyoko Sumeragi and illustrated by Mika Pikazo, The World Bows Down Before My Flames began publication under Kadokawa Shoten's Kadokawa Sneaker Bunko light novel imprint on December 1, 2022. Five volumes have been released as of December 27, 2025.

On April 26, 2024, Yen Press announced that they had licensed the series.

No.	Title	Original release date	North American release date
1	The Dark Lord's Castle Goes Boom 魔王城、燃やしてみた	December 1, 2022; 978-4-04-112878-7	October 15, 2024; 979-8-8554-0023-6
2	The Dark Lord's Army Goes Chop 魔王軍、ぶった斬ってみた	December 28, 2023; 978-4-04-113729-1	March 18, 2025; 979-8-8554-1044-0
3	Healing Magic Hits the Max 治癒魔法、極めてみた	August 1, 2024; 978-4-04-115076-4	January 13, 2026; 979-8-8554-1768-5
4	The Neighboring Government Goes Splat 隣国、黙らせてみた	April 1, 2025; 978-4-04-115873-9	July 14, 2026; 979-8-8554-3020-2
5	— 死霊、喰らってみた	December 27, 2025; 978-4-04-116965-0	—

=== Manga ===
A manga adaptation illustrated by Koyuki began serialization on Fujimi Shobo's Niconico Seiga-based Dra Dra Flat website on August 10, 2023. The manga's chapters have been collected into two tankōbon volumes as of July 2025.

No.	Release date	ISBN
1	April 8, 2024	978-4-04-075373-7
2	July 9, 2025	978-4-04-075951-7

== Reception ==
The series won the Grand Prize at the 27th annual Sneaker Awards in 2022, 12 years after the 15th Sneaker Awards in 2010.
