= Onna Tomodachi wa Tanomeba Igaito Yarasete Kureru =

Japanese light novel series

- First light novel volume cover

女友達は頼めば意外とヤらせてくれる
- Genre: Romantic comedy
- Novel series
- Written by: Yū Kagami
- Published by: Kakuyomu
- Original run: April 10, 2021 – January 16, 2022
- Light novel
- Written by: Yū Kagami
- Illustrated by: Kuduyu Komori
- Published by: Kadokawa Shoten
- Imprint: Kadokawa Sneaker Bunko
- Original run: April 1, 2023 – present
- Volumes: 8
- Manga
- Written by: Yū Kagami
- Illustrated by: Rokuro
- Published by: Kadokawa Shoten
- Imprint: Kadokawa Comics A
- Magazine: Comic Newtype
- Original run: April 11, 2023 – present
- Volumes: 5

Onna Tomodachi wa Tanomeba Igaito Yarasete Kureru (女友達は頼めば意外とヤらせてくれる; lit. "Female Friends Are Unexpectedly Willing To Let You Do Them If You Just Ask") is a Japanese light novel series written by Yū Kagami and illustrated by Kuduyu Komori. It originally began as a web novel serialized on Kadokawa's Kakuyomu online publishing platform from April 2021 to January 2022. Kadokawa Shoten later began publishing it as a light novel under their Kadokawa Sneaker Bunko imprint in April 2023; seven volumes have been released as of January 2026. A manga adaptation illustrated by Rokuro began serialization on Kadokawa Shoten's Comic Newtype service in April 2023, and has been compiled into four volumes as of February 2026.

== Plot ==
Toshiya Minato, an ordinary high school student, befriends Aoi Hazuki, his popular classmate. Despite the two being opposites when it comes to popularity, the two quickly become close, hanging out often. One day, when she was staying at his house. Toshiya decides to tease her by peeking at her panties. When she finds out, he asks her to show them to him one more time. Although she initially hesitates, she agrees and shows her panties to him. Realizing that Toshiya is a pervert, Aoi decides to agree to his requests, finding them fun.

== Characters ==
Toshiya Minato (湊 寿也, Minato Toshiya)
A high school student with a loner personality. He befriended Aoi a few months into high school, which was a surprise given her popularity. He is a fan of mobile games. Later on, he and Aoi become sex friends.
Aoi Hazuki (葉月 葵, Hazuki Aoi)
Toshiya's classmate, who has long blonde hair and is the most popular girl in class. Due to her popularity and beauty, she becomes the object of Toshiya's attention. She has large breasts, which she uses to tease Toshiya. She is also a fan of video games. The two start hanging out after they became friends, with her finding amusement in his requests. His requests become increasingly perverted, until they eventually have sex.
Ruka Serina (瀬里奈 瑠伽, Serina Ruka)
A beautiful and serious student with long black hair. She initially has a complex about wearing bloomers under her skirt. She lives in an old house. She later becomes one of Toshiya's sex friends as well.
Tsubasa Iori (伊織 翼, Iori Tsubasa)
The student council president, who is popular and has a tomboyish appearance. She becomes one of Toshiya's friends.
Maine Shirayuki (白雪 舞音, Shirayuki Maine)
A high school student who is currently avoiding going to school. Due to being at risk of failing, Tsubasa asks Toshiya to approach her.
Ura Nanase (七瀬 うら, Nanase Ura)
A transfer student who befriends Toshiya. She is also a cosplayer.
Kotone Azusa (梓 琴音, Azusa Kotone)
A high school student who was the first girl Toshiya confessed to. At the time, he only decided to do so as she was considered merely the fifth-prettiest girl. However, she rejects him. Later on, she approaches him and asks to be friends.

== Media ==
=== Web novel ===
Yū Kagami originally began posting the series to Kadokawa's online publishing platform Kakuyomu, releasing 77 chapters between April 10, 2021, and January 16, 2022. Two special chapters were released on December 13 and 14, 2025.

=== Light novel ===
Kadokawa Shoten began publishing it as a light novel in 2023 under their Kadokawa Sneaker Bunko imprint, with illustrations provided by Kuduyu Komori. The first volume was released on April 1, 2023; eight volumes have been released as of July 1, 2026.

No.	Japanese release date	Japanese ISBN
1	April 1, 2023	978-4-04-113541-9
2	August 1, 2023	978-4-04-113968-4
3	December 28, 2023	978-4-04-114588-3
4	May 31, 2024	978-4-04-115072-6
5	November 1, 2024	978-4-04-115627-8
6	May 30, 2025	978-4-04-116158-6
7	January 30, 2026	978-4-04-117099-1
8	July 1, 2026	978-4-04-117507-1

=== Manga ===
A manga adaptation illustrated by Rokuro began serialization on Kadokawa Shoten's Comic Newtype service on April 11, 2023. It later began to be serialized in Kadokawa's ComicWalker service on October 4, 2023. The first tankōbon volume was released on October 10, 2023; five volumes have been released as of September 10, 2026.

No.	Japanese release date	Japanese ISBN
1	October 10, 2023	978-4-04-114334-6
2	May 10, 2023	978-4-04-115094-8
3	June 10, 2025	978-4-04-116324-5
4	February 10, 2026	978-4-04-117220-9
5	September 10, 2026	978-4-04-117837-9
