= Otoko Girai na Bijin Shimai o Namae mo Tsugezu ni Tasuketara Ittai Dō Naru? =

Japanese light novel series

- First light novel volume cover

男嫌いな美人姉妹を名前も告げずに助けたら一体どうなる?
- Genre: Romantic comedy
- Novel series
- Written by: Myon
- Published by: Kakuyomu
- Original run: November 23, 2021 – July 29, 2023
- Light novel
- Written by: Myon
- Illustrated by: Giuniu
- Published by: Kadokawa Shoten
- Imprint: Kadokawa Sneaker Bunko
- Original run: March 1, 2023 – present
- Volumes: 8
- Manga
- Written by: Myon
- Illustrated by: Junko Shiba
- Published by: Kadokawa Shoten
- Imprint: Kadokawa Comics A
- Magazine: Comic Newtype
- Original run: June 27, 2023 – present
- Volumes: 5

Otoko Girai na Bijin Shimai o Namae mo Tsugezu ni Tasuketara Ittai Dō Naru? (男嫌いな美人姉妹を名前も告げずに助けたら一体どうなる?), shortened as Otomai (おとまい) is a Japanese light novel series written by Myon and illustrated by Giuniu. It began as a web novel posted on the Kakuyomu website between November 2021 and July 2023. Kadokawa Shoten began publishing it under their Kadokawa Sneaker Bunko imprint in March 2023, with eight volumes published as of January 2026. A manga adaptation illustrated by Junko Shiba began serialization on Kadokawa Shoten's Comic Newtype manga website in June 2023, and has been compiled into five volumes as of June 2026.

== Plot ==
The series follows Hayato Dōmoto, an orphan high school student who rescues the Shinjō family after their home is infiltrated by a robber. The two daughters, his classmates Arisa and Aina, thankful for his rescue, become deeply attached to him. The two sisters, who are the most popular girls in class and are notorious for disliking men, fall in love with him and try to get his love.

== Characters ==
Hayato Dōmoto (堂本 隼人, Dōmoto Hayato)
A high school student who lives alone following the death of his parents. He rescues the Shinjō family after their home is infiltrated by a robber. Although he donned a pumpkin mask to hide his identity, Aina and Arisa find out anyway.
Aina Shinjō (新条 藍那, Shinjō Aina)
Voiced by: Chika Anzai (PV), Yui Asami (ASMR)
Arisa's younger sister. She becomes attached to Hayato and wants to carry his baby. She originally hated men due to an incident in the past, but falls in love with Hayato after realizing she was their family's rescuer.
Arisa Shinjō (新条 亜利沙, Shinjō Arisa)
Voiced by: Chika Anzai (PV), Yuka Hinata (ASMR)
Aina's older sister. She is deeply protective of Aina and is initially jealous of Hayato. She later falls in love with Hayato after finding out his identity and wishes to become his "slave".
Sakina Shinjō (新条 咲奈, Shinjō Sakina)
Arisa and Aina's mother. She raised them by herself after her husband's death. Hayato came to their rescue after a robber attacked their home and kept her hostage.

== Media ==
=== Light novel ===
Written by Myon, the series was originally posted as a web novel titled Bijin Shimai o Tasuketara Seidai ni Yanda Kudan (美人姉妹を助けたら盛大に病んだ件) on the Kakuyomu website between November 23, 2021, and July 29, 2023. It was later picked up for publication by Kadokawa Shoten, which began publication under their Kadokawa Sneaker Bunko imprint and features illustrations by Giuniu. The first volume was released on March 1, 2023; seven volumes have been released as of January 2026. A promotional video featuring narration by Chika Anzai was posted on YouTube to promote the first volume's release.

No.	Japanese release date	Japanese ISBN
1	March 1, 2023	978-4-04-113455-9
2	June 30, 2023	978-4-04-113842-7
3	November 1, 2023	978-4-04-114275-2
4	March 29, 2024	978-4-04-114775-7
5	October 1, 2024	978-4-04-115229-4
6	March 1, 2025	978-4-04-115992-7
7	August 1, 2025	978-4-04-116451-8
8	January 30, 2026	978-4-04-117105-9
9	December 1, 2026	978-4-04-117742-6

=== Manga ===
A manga adaptation illustrated by Junko Shiba began serialization on Kadokawa Shoten's Comic Newtype manga website on June 27, 2023. The first volume was published on April 9, 2024; Five tankōbon volumes have been released as of June 2026.

No.	Japanese release date	Japanese ISBN
1	April 9, 2024	978-4-04-114984-3
2	October 10, 2024	978-4-04-115482-3
3	April 10, 2025	978-4-04-116174-6
4	November 10, 2025	978-4-04-116917-9
5	June 10, 2026	978-4-04-117545-3

=== Other ===
An ASMR product was released on March 1, 2025.

== Reception ==
It was reported in October 2024 that the light novels and manga combined had sold over 150,000 copies physically and digitally.
