= Since I've Entered the World of Romantic Comedy Manga, I'll Do My Best to Make the Losing Heroine Happy =

Japanese light novel series

- The cover of the first light novel volume, featuring Sei Shimada

ラブコメ漫画に入ってしまったので、推しの負けヒロインを全力で幸せにする (Rabukome Manga ni Haitteshimatta node, Oshi no Make Heroine o Zenryoku de Shiawase ni Suru)
- Genre: Romantic comedy
- Novel series
- Written by: Shiryu
- Published by: Kakuyomu
- Original run: January 21, 2021 – March 26, 2022 (on hiatus)
- Light novel
- Written by: Shiryu
- Illustrated by: Bara
- Published by: Kadokawa Shoten
- Imprint: Kadokawa Sneaker Bunko
- Original run: February 1, 2022 – present
- Volumes: 3
- Manga
- Written by: Shiryu
- Illustrated by: Shiharu
- Published by: Kadokawa Shoten
- Imprint: Kadokawa Comics A
- Magazine: Comic Newtype
- Original run: September 20, 2022 – present
- Volumes: 1
- icon

Since I've Entered the World of Romantic Comedy Manga, I'll Do My Best to Make the Losing Heroine Happy (Japanese: ラブコメ漫画に入ってしまったので、推しの負けヒロインを全力で幸せにする, Hepburn: Rabukome Manga ni Haitteshimatta node, Oshi no Make Heroine o Zenryoku de Shiawase ni Suru) is a Japanese light novel series written by Shiryu and illustrated by Bara. It was first serialized online in January 2021 on Kadokawa's user-generated novel publishing website Kakuyomu. Later, it began print publication by Kadokawa Shoten under their Kadokawa Sneaker Bunko imprint in February 2022. As of February 2023, three volumes have been released. A manga adaptation illustrated by Shiharu has been serialized online via Kadokawa Shoten's Comic Newtype website since September 2022.

== Plot ==
Tsukasa Hisamura is a big fan of the My Childhood Friend, the Young Lady, Keeps Getting in the Way, So We Can't Have a Normal Rom-Com manga, also known as "Ojojama". He especially loves the character named Sei Shimada, a side character who is considered the losing heroine. One day, he gets into an accident and somehow wakes up in the universe of "Ojojama" as Tsukasa Hisamura, a side character who bears the same name as him. Thinking it was a dream, he stumbles upon Sei Shimada, his favourite character, and confesses his feelings to her. Later on, realizing that he now lives in the "Ojojama" world, he decides to do his best to make his favorite character happy.

== Characters ==
Tsukasa Hisamura (久村 司, Hisamura Tsukasa)
A high school student who gets transported to the world of "Ojojama" as "Tsukasa Hisamura", the side character who bears the same name as him. Not long after that, he meets his favorite character, Sei Shimada, another side character who is considered a "losing heroine". Thinking it was a dream, he decides to confess his feelings to the naturally confused and flustered Sei. When he realizes that he is not in a dream and he now lives in the world of "Ojojama", his embarrassment takes over, although he does not regret his confession. He has short black hair with average height and build. He is considered to be rather handsome, but this is mostly overshadowed due to the presence of Yuichi, his best friend in the class. After getting into the world of "Ojojama", Tsukasa could not really remember how the original Tsukasa looked like, but he somehow suspect that the original always look similar to him in the first place. Later on, Sei accepts his confession, and they become a couple.
Sei Shimada (嶋田 聖, Shimada Sei)
Tsukasa and Shiho's classmate, who is the subject of adoration and affection by the former. She has silvery-white short hair and is considered attractive by the boys in her class. In the original storyline, she investigates Yuichi through Tsukasa to find out whether he is worthy of her best friend's attention. In doing so, she inadvertently fell in love with Yuichi, but she decides to keep her feelings hidden for Shiho's sake. After Tsukasa gets into the world of "Ojojama", his confession makes her confused and flustered, but deep down she is happy that someone has such strong feelings for her. She is considered as someone who is composed and kind, but it turns out she is rather weak with praises and compliments, especially from Tsukasa. Later on, she accepts Tsukasa's confession, and they become a couple.
Yuichi Shigemoto (重本 勇一, Shigemoto Yuuichi)
Tsukasa's best friend and also Sei and Shiho's classmate, who is the main protagonist of "Ojojama" and is considered by Tsukasa as typical harem manga protagonist. He is extremely popular due to his looks and innate abilities in sports. Due to interventions by Kaori since elementary school, he believes that he is deeply unpopular among girls. He is the subject of affection of both Shiho and Kaori both in the original and current storyline. In the original storyline, he did not realize their feelings until much later. However, in the current storyline, due to Tsukasa's intervention, both Shiho and Kaori confess to him. He likes playing basketball and is in the basketball club. His skill is said to rival that of professionals.
Shiho Fujise (藤瀬 詩帆, Fujise Shiho)
Sei's best friend and Tsukasa and Yuichi's classmate, who is one of the protagonists in the "Ojojama". She has medium dark brown hair and cute appearance. She has been in love with Yuichi ever since she saved him when she was being hit on in middle school, even though Yuichi himself did not really remember this. In the original storyline, their feelings were actually mutual, but they both were not aware of that. In the current storyline, before she could confess to Yuichi, Tsukasa's intervention stops that from happening, and in turn she is locked in a love battle for Yuichi with Kaori.
Kaori Toujoin (東條院 歌織, Toujouin Kaori)
A young lady who is the daughter of the president of Toujoin Group, one of the largest conglomerates in the world of "Ojojama", and is one of the protagonists in the "Ojojama". She has long blonde hair and refined beauty. She attends the same school as Tsukasa, Sei, Yuichi, and Shiho, albeit in a different class. She is considered an absolute beauty among her peers, and she is also blessed in academic and physical aspects. Her mother died right after she was born, and her father is always busy with his work, causing her to be lonely and craving love. From elementary school, she has set her eyes on Yuichi, going as far as stopping other girls from getting close to him and one-sidedly declaring he was her fiancé. She is currently in a love battle for Yuichi with Shiho, with both of them already declaring their love for him.
Rie Hisamura (久村 凛恵, Hisamura Rie)
Tsukasa's sister who is a year younger than him. In the original storyline, she was one of the "losing heroines" around Yuichi. When Tsukasa gets into the world of "Ojojama", his constant praises to her are causing her to develop brother complex, even though it ultimately leads nowhere due to Tsukasa and Sei becoming a couple not long after. Due to their parents' busy schedules, Rie is the one who handles housework in the family.

== Media ==
=== Light novels ===
Written by Shiryu and illustrated by Bara, Since I've Entered the World of Romantic Comedy Manga, I'll Do My Best to Make the Losing Heroine Happy began serialization on Kadokawa's user-generated novel publishing website Kakuyomu on January 21, 2021. As of March 2022, 84 chapters have been published on the website. Since I've Entered the World of Romantic Comedy Manga, I'll Do My Best to Make the Losing Heroine Happy won the special prize in the 6th Kakuyomu Web Novel Contest. Later, it began print publication under Kadokawa Shoten's Kadokawa Sneaker Bunko imprint, with the first volume being released on February 1, 2022. Three volumes have been released as of February 2023.

==== Volumes ====
No.	Release date	ISBN
1	February 1, 2022	978-4-04-1122303
2	July 1, 2022	978-4-04-1122310
3	February 1, 2023	978-4-04-1133866

=== Manga ===
A manga adaptation illustrated by Shiharu began serialization on Kadokawa Shoten's Comic Newtype website on September 20, 2022. A single tankōbon volume has been released as of October 2023.

==== Volumes ====
No.	Release date	ISBN
1	October 10, 2023	978-4-04-1142585
