= From Overshadowed to Overpowered =

Japanese light novel series

- From Overshadowed to Overpowered: Second Reincarnation of a Talentless Sage
- First light novel volume cover

落第賢者の学院無双 ～二度転生した最強賢者、400年後の世界を魔剣で無双～ (Rakudai Kenja no Gakuin Musō: Nido Tensei Shita Saikyō Kenja, 400-nen-go no Sekai o Maken de Musō)
- Genre: Fantasy, isekai
- Novel series
- Written by: Arata Shiraishi
- Published by: Shōsetsuka ni Narō
- Published: 2018
- Light novel
- Written by: Arata Shiraishi
- Illustrated by: Uodenim
- Published by: Kadokawa Shoten
- Imprint: Kadokawa Sneaker Bunko
- Original run: October 1, 2019 – March 1, 2022
- Volumes: 8
- Manga
- Written by: Arata Shiraishi
- Illustrated by: Kentarō
- Published by: Square Enix
- English publisher: NA: Square Enix Comikey
- Imprint: Gangan Comics UP!
- Magazine: Manga Up!
- Original run: September 26, 2019 – present
- Volumes: 9
- Anime television series
- Directed by: Hisashi Ishii
- Written by: Deko Akao
- Music by: Takaaki Nakahashi
- Studio: EMT Squared
- Licensed by: Crunchyroll
- Original network: Tokyo MX, ABC, BS Fuji, WOWOW
- Original run: July 2, 2026 – September 17, 2026
- Episodes: 12
- icon

From Overshadowed to Overpowered: Second Reincarnation of a Talentless Sage (Japanese: 落第賢者の学院無双 ～二度転生した最強賢者、400年後の世界を魔剣で無双～, Hepburn: Rakudai Kenja no Gakuin Musō: Nido Tensei Shita Saikyō Kenja, 400-nen-go no Sekai o Maken de Musō) is a Japanese light novel series written by Arata Shiraishi and illustrated by Uodenim. It was originally published as a web novel on the online publication platform Shōsetsuka ni Narō in 2018, before it was acquired and published by Kadokawa Shoten under their Kadokawa Sneaker Bunko imprint from October 2019 to March 2022. A manga adaptation illustrated by Kentarō began serialization on Square Enix's Manga Up! service in September 2019. An anime television series adaptation produced by EMT Squared aired from July to September 2026.

== Plot ==
Ephtal, a magician who is actually the reincarnation of a human from the modern world, spent his entire life trying to improve his skills in magic. However, he was unable to succeed before dying of old age. After his death, he is reincarnated 400 years later, also as a sage named Ephtal. Now finding himself in a world where, due to magic becoming weaker, he is now the strongest magic user, Ephtal decides to live out his second chance and fulfill what he was unable to do in his previous life.

== Characters ==
Ephtal (エフタル, Efutaru)
Voiced by: Shūichirō Umeda
A Sage of the Wind who spent his life unsuccessfully trying to become a skilled magician. After his reincarnation, he is now one of the strongest magic users, as he finds himself in a world where magic's power has declined.
Anastasia (アナスタシア, Anasutashia)
Voiced by: Reo Osanai
Merlin (メルリン)
Voiced by: Haruka Shiraishi
Ephtal (エフタル, Efutaru)
Voiced by: Hiroki Tōchi (sage and old), Ayaka Fukuhara (youth)
Iria (イリア)
Voiced by: Emiri Katō
Fraser (フレイザー, Fureizā)
Voiced by: Daisuke Hirakawa
Abe (エイブ, Eibu)
Voiced by: Shinichiro Kamio
Maria (マリア)
Voiced by: Rina Kawaguchi
Majin (Genie) (魔神)
Voiced by: Hiroki Takahashi
Tatiana (タチアナ, Tachiana)
Voiced by: Sora Amamiya

== Media ==
=== Light novel ===
Written by Arata Shiraishi, From Overshadowed to Overpowered originally began as a self-published web novel on the online publication platform Shōsetsuka ni Narō in 2018. Following positive reception, it was acquired and published by Kadokawa under their Kadokawa Sneaker Bunko imprint featuring illustrations by Uodenim, after that which both the web novel and Shiraishi's account were deleted from the website, with eight volumes published between October 1, 2019, and March 1, 2022.

No.	Japanese release date	Japanese ISBN
1	October 1, 2019	978-4-04-108624-7
2	February 1, 2020	978-4-04-108625-4
3	July 1, 2020	978-4-04-109765-6
4	September 1, 2020	978-4-04-109766-3
5	December 26, 2020	978-4-04-110953-3
6	June 1, 2021	978-4-04-111298-4
7	October 29, 2021	978-4-04-112039-2
8	March 1, 2022	978-4-04-112040-8

=== Manga ===
A manga adaptation illustrated by Kentarō began serialization on Square Enix's Manga Up! service on September 26, 2019, under the title Rakudai Kenja no Gakuin Musō: Futatabime no Tensei, S-Rank Cheat Majutsu-shi Bōken-roku (落第賢者の学院無双 ～二度目の転生、Sランクチート魔術師冒険録～), with the first tankōbon volume released on January 31, 2020; with nine volumes released as of July 7, 2026. The manga is released in English on Manga Up! and is also licensed in English by Comikey.

No.	Release date	ISBN
1	January 31, 2020	978-4-7575-6487-9
2	September 7, 2020	978-4-7575-6833-4
3	June 7, 2021	978-4-7575-7297-3
4	February 7, 2022	978-4-7575-7704-6
5	October 6, 2022	978-4-7575-8190-6
6	August 7, 2023	978-4-7575-8718-2
7	July 5, 2024	978-4-7575-9289-6
8	June 6, 2025	978-4-7575-9885-0
9	July 7, 2026	978-4-3010-0625-1

=== Anime ===
An anime television series adaptation was announced on February 20, 2026, with the English title of The Failed Sage's Academy Domination. It is produced by EMT Squared and directed by Hisashi Ishii, with Deko Akao supervising series scripts, Hideki Furukawa designing the characters, and Takaaki Nakahashi composing the music. The series aired from July 2 to September 17, 2026, on Tokyo MX and other networks. (Note: Tokyo MX listed the series premiere on July 1 at 24:00, which is effectively July 2 at midnight JST.) The opening theme song is "+Encount", performed by Flow, while the ending theme song is "Dōkei" (憧憬; 'Aspiration'), performed by TrySail. Crunchyroll streamed the series.

==== Episodes ====
No.	Title	Directed by	Written by	Storyboarded by	Original release date (Note: Episodes are released on dAnime Store, ABEMA, U-NEXT, Anime Hōdai and Crunchyroll 6 days before their televised airings.)
1	"Prologue"; Transliteration: "Raijinkō -PROLOGUE-" (Japanese: 雷神皇 -PROLOGUE-)	Hisashi Ishii	Deko Akao	Hisashi Ishii	July 2, 2026
After helping the Hero defeat the Demon Lord, four Sages are named Magic Emperors. Sage Ephtal, the Lightning Emperor, spends the next decade training students, including Merlin, a demon baby he rescued after the battle. Eager to take over his school so Ephtal can retire, Merlin rushes her training and foolishly hunts a dangerous monster. Ephtal rescues her using 10th Level Magic, warning her against impatience. Secretly terminally ill, Ephtal regrets never truly mastering magic. His despair deepens when the Flame Emperor publishes research on identifying magical aptitude at birth. Merlin tests as S-Rank for Wind and Water. Ephtal discovers he possesses absolutely zero natural aptitude and only achieved 10th level through sheer, endless training, meaning true mastery was always impossible for him. The heartbreak worsens his illness, and Ephtal passes away. In the afterlife, he remembers he has been reincarnated multiple times. Impressed that in this life he became an Emperor despite having no natural talent, the Goddess grants him yet another reincarnation. Ephtal awakens as a four-year-old with his adult memories intact, determined to master magic. When a dragon attacks a nearby town, Ephtal instinctively destroys it, realizing this time he reincarnated with his 10th Level Magic completely intact.
2	"Lost Technology"; Transliteration: "Muteki no Tensai -Lost Technology-" (Japanese: 無適の天才 -Lost Technology-)	Maki Kamiya	Saeka Fujimoto	Hisashi Ishii	July 9, 2026
Ephtal learns he has reincarnated to the same world, 400 years in the future. His father, Duke Orcott, is actually a descendant from Ephtal's past life as the Lightning Emperor. Because Ephtal's mother is a non-magical mistress, Orcott's other wives banished them to the countryside, where only Ephtal's half-brother, Frasier, supports them. When tests again show Ephtal has no aptitude his mother and Frasier decide he should go to Military Academy. Ephtal discovers magic culture has severely declined; Level 4 is now considered advanced, while Level 9 and above are "Lost Magic." After Ephtal accidentally reveals his power to Frasier, he tricks him into believing it was a dream and agrees to train for military academy. By age 10, Ephtal becomes an expert swordsman, even defeating former Knight Commander Moria using karate moves from a previous life in Japan. Moria, the Headmaster of Azul Military Academy, promises to enrol Ephtal at 15. At 14, planning to run away to a magic academy instead, Ephtal is summoned by Orcott. Orcott proves to be a pompous scumbag obsessed with his Lightning Emperor lineage. Viewing Ephtal as an embarrassment due to lacking magical aptitude, Orcott decides to humiliate him by demanding he duel his sadistic eldest son, Joachim.
3	"Overkill"; Transliteration: "Gedō -Overkill-" (Japanese: 外道 -OVERKILL-)	Takashi Hirayama	Deko Akao	Hisashi Ishii	July 16, 2026
Furious that his descendants are such scumbags, Ephtal swiftly defeats Joachim for belittling his mother, Iria, humiliating Orcott. Two weeks later, Frasier and Moria arrive with a baby, explaining that war has erupted with the Southern Barbarians. Amid the chaos, it was revealed that the First Minister plotted to assassinate the King's newborn son to secure the throne for his own son. To protect the young prince, Frasier and Moria are searching for the main army. They also carry evidence that Orcott conspired with the First Minister to provoke the war. Ephtal joins them, but they are ambushed by Orcott and his personal mage army. When Orcott orders his mages to execute Frasier using a Level 6 spell Ephtal himself created 400 years ago, an enraged Ephtal annihilates the mages with Level 10 lightning magic. He captures Orcott and Joachim, who are hanged by the King for treason. Ephtal discovers Frasier survived the attack thanks to Oberon's Guard, an heirloom necklace Ephtal owned 400 years prior. Frasier becomes the new Duke, and alongside Moria, agrees to keep Ephtal's Level 10 magic a secret. They support his plan to attend the Magic Academy, though Moria insists on training him in swordsmanship until he turns 15.
4	"Seek Freedom"; Transliteration: "Tabidachi -Seek Freedom-" (Japanese: 旅立ち -Seek Freedom-)	Yuki Nishihata	Deko Akao	Yuki Nishihata	July 23, 2026
At age 15, Ephtal journeys to Krone Magic Academy. En route, he encounters the corrupt, A-rank adventurer Edwards the Mad Flame, who has enslaved a demon girl named Anastasia with a slave crest, intending to abuse her once the crest becomes permanent. When an Orc Berserker attacks, Edwards realises he cannot defeat it and cowardly traps civilian witnesses for the Orc to kill to protect his reputation. Ephtal defeats the Orc and forces Edwards to confess to the attempted murders, which sets Anastasia free from him. Fearing arrest or re-enslavement, Anastasia begs Ephtal to claim her. She reveals she is a descendant of Demon Royalty and distantly related to Merlin, the Academy's Headmistress, whom Ephtal is glad to realise is his surviving adopted daughter. Ephtal accepts Anastasia as his temporary slave. In the city, Ephtal takes Anastasia to dinner, using the wealth he inherited from Orcott to force the snobby restaurant staff to treat Anastasia with respect. He also encourages her to break her "slave habits" by freely expressing her suppressed emotions by getting angry at him. The following day, recognizing her massive magical potential, Ephtal registers for the Academy's entrance exam and encourages Anastasia to do the same.
5	"Through Her Eyes"; Transliteration: "Saikai -Through Her Eyes-" (Japanese: 再会 -Through Her Eyes-)	Masahito Otani	Azuki Shōzu	Moe Kato	July 30, 2026
Exam proctor Frantz Bauer announces the first challenge is a battle royale. Ephtal and Anastasia pass after defeating 587 applicants, with Frantz stunned by Ephtal's non-verbal, simultaneous Level 4 spells and Anastasia's level 3 spells. Ephtal misinterprets the written exam instructions and answers all 1,000 questions instead of just the section on Lightning Magic, earning a historic score of 958. Anastasia earns a spot in the Special Class, while Ephtal is named Special Elite Student Representative, a role offering free tuition and a cash allowance in exchange for assistance in public relations and cross-academy cooperation. At Krone Academy, Ephtal spots Merlin, headmistress of Altena Academy, and tries to avoid her. She recognizes his aura and notices his name matches the legendary Lightning Emperor. Merlin accuses him of being the Emperor's reincarnation, pointing out his exam answers relied heavily on 400-year-old lost magic theories. To protect his goal of mastering magic, Ephtal fabricates a lie: he claims the Emperor had a secret lovechild who founded the Orcott noble family, making Ephtal the Emperor's 13th-generation descendant. To convince a skeptical Merlin, he reveals he knows the Emperor had zero natural magic aptitude. Believing him, Merlin challenges Ephtal to a mock battle, which he accepts, curious about her growth over 400 years.
6	"Dear Eftal"; Transliteration: "Raijingeki -Dear Ephtal-" (Japanese: 雷神撃 -Dear Ephtal-)	Ryo Okubo	Deko Akao	Hisashi Ishii	August 6, 2026
After an intense duel showcasing their 6th and 7th level magic, Ephtal nearly defeats Merlin with superior skill before she teleports behind him to launch an 8th-level fire attack. Expecting this, Ephtal instantly teleports behind her. Merlin counters with a fourfold 8th-level lightning spell cast from all four hands and feet. Proud of his adopted daughter's progress, Ephtal absorbs her attack using 10th-level lightning magic, neutralizing it safely. Recognizing that only the legendary Emperor possessed such skill, Merlin concludes Ephtal really is his reincarnation. Ephtal confesses to this, praising her as his daughter and moving her to tears. Anastasia interrupts, reminding them the audience just witnessed Ephtal using Lost Magic. Though disappointed Ephtal owns a slave, Merlin trusts his intentions and helps them escape the swarming crowd. Merlin takes them to Ephtal's former mansion she kept preserved for 400 years. She announces she will adopt Ephtal and Anastasia, transferring them to Altena Academy. Seeing the perks and opportunities available as the headmistress's children, Ephtal accepts to advance his goal of mastering magic.
7	"Master Smile"; Transliteration: "Shōjo no Omoi -Master Smile-" (Japanese: 少女の想い -Master Smile-)	Park Jong-Won	Deko Akao	Takeshi Mori	August 13, 2026
Ephtal visits his mansion's secret treasury to retrieve the katana Raikiri, an SSS Rank treasure he took from the defeated Demon King. The guardian, Genie, is unaware of Ephtal's identity and insults him as a thieving brat and Merlin as an old hag. After Ephtal easily claims the sword Merlin appears, prompting the terrified Genie to beg for mercy. Later, Ephtal wins a town-wide treasure hunt to secure a hot springs trip. Anastasia requests a small statue from the prize that resembles Ephtal when he smiles. Merlin notices Anastasia's unique, dangerous slave crest and questions why Ephtal took her in. Ephtal becomes uncharacteristically angry at Merlin and refuses to discuss the matter or abandon Anastasia. Ephtal and Anastasia begin attending Altena, where the students are all demons and elves who consider humans a "lesser species". Ephtal ignores challenges from the demon Abe and elf Maria. Merlin takes over teaching their class, declaring she only cares about instructing Ephtal. The jealous Abe crudely mocks Ephtal as Merlin's boy-toy, but Ephtal remains unprovoked. As inter-class battles approach, Merlin asks for magic-swordsman volunteers. Abe immediately volunteers, and Ephtal is stunned when the terrified Anastasia inexplicably nominates Ephtal to challenge Abe for the position.
8	"No Escape"; Transliteration: "Shukumei -No Escape-" (Japanese: 宿命 -No Escape-)	Kohei Takahashi	Deko Akao	Hisashi Ishii	August 20, 2026
Ephtal intends to lose to Abe on purpose, but Abe is so far below his skill level Ephtal's casual kick knocks Abe unconscious. That night, Anastasia steals Raikiri. Ephtal reveals to Merlin Anastasia bears an illegal Special Slave Crest that can physically force slaves to commit crimes. Knowing this, Ephtal had waited for her master to activate it so he could trace them and free her. Merlin is afraid as Special Crests are contracts with Gods, and breaking one can earn that God's wrath. Meanwhile, Anastasia's master Abe gloats over acquiring Raikiri. It is revealed each generation of her Branova clan must steal five artefacts for Abe's Portes clan to repay starting a war with them 300 years ago. Anastasia expects her freedom, as her sister Tatiana stole three artefacts for Abe's father and Anastasia has now stolen two for Abe. Abe grants her freedom but reveals the Special Crest is actually intergenerational, so her future children will belong to him. Anastasia recalls her sister Tatiana dying stealing for Abe's father. Abe arbitrarily invalidates Tatiana's three stolen artefacts, meaning to satisfy the five owed by her generation, Anastasia must steal another three. Abe also smugly admits the Branova clan was innocent, as it was the Portes that stole the Branovas' land and enslaved them.
9	"Let Me Pay"; Transliteration: "Dakkan -Let Me Pay-" (Japanese: 奪還 -Let Me Pay-)	Ichizo Kobayashi	Azuki Shōzu	Takeshi Mori	August 27, 2026
Wandering in despair, Anastasia is targeted by thugs who decide to take advantage of her sex slave crest, but Ephtal intervenes and defeats them. After learning he is the reincarnated Lightning Emperor, a relieved Anastasia begs for his help. Abe plans to sell Raikiri for 5,000 gold. Encouraged by Ephtal and seeking justice for Tatiana, Anastasia confronts Abe to demand he return the sword. Infuriated, Abe threatens to repeatedly impregnate her to claim her children as slaves. When she refuses to yield, he tries to disfigure her with Raikiri. Ephtal catches the blade, praising Anastasia for finally standing her ground. Ephtal easily overpowers Abe and uses Level 7 wind magic to obliterate his army of thugs and the Portes family mansion. Merlin arrives to reveal Abe had already sold other items Anastasia stole from Ephtal's mansion, items she was able to track and finally connect the whole Portes family to the theft of relics, drug dealing, mafia connections and hundreds of other crimes. As such, she immediately expels Abe from the Academy. Ephtal retrieves Raikiri and assures Anastasia that although her Special Crest remains intact for now, her life is entirely her own to live.
10	"Veiled Truth"; Transliteration: "Giman -Veiled Truth-" (Japanese: 欺瞞 -Veiled Truth-)	Ryo Okubo	Deko Akao	Ryo Okubo	September 3, 2026
Ephtal decides to remove Anastasia's crest by defeating the contracts Beast God. Anastasia apologizes to Genie for stealing Merlin's treasure. Genie forgives her but restricts her vault access unless Ephtal or Merlin accompany her. Merlin reveals the vaults hold cursed items, including one Anastasia owned as a child. Startled by a rat, Merlin drops the item, transforming herself and Anastasia into magicless children. Not wanting to be humiliated if Ephtal sees them, they seek out Merlin's curse-breaking grimoires at the academy. They manipulate Instructor Maria by calling her "big sis Maria" to access Merlin's magically locked office and grimoires. Discovering a remedy requiring Yunotron fruit, they fetch some from the greenhouse. They eat a fruit at home, but it fails. Ephtal discovers them, takes them to a hot spring, and adds the fruit to the bathwater, instantly restoring their adult forms. Anastasia confesses her fears about Ephtal fighting the Beast God, while Merlin admits jealousy over his devotion. Ephtal questions why magic has weakened globally. Merlin explains that ten years after Ephtal's death, an ancient Magia Monolith was destroyed in an unexplained explosion, unleashing miasma that weakened all forms of magic. Because Ephtal reincarnated from before the Magia Burst, he remains unaffected and is the only person capable of casting Level 10 spells.
11	"False Dawn"; Transliteration: "Danjou -False Dawn-" (Japanese: 断鎖 -False Dawn-)	Takashi Hirayama	Azuki Shōzu	Hisashi Ishii	September 10, 2026
Ephtal takes Anastasia to a secret training room under the mansion where 400 years ago he and the other three Emperors cast a permanent Level 10 protection spell, allowing anyone to train spells of any level there without posing a risk to people outside. Ephtal breaks Anastasia's slave seal, causing the Beast God to manifest inside the protective circle, Seiryu the Holy Beast Dragon. Seiryu is fascinated Ephtal is not afraid of him, and invites him to attack in any manner he wishes. Ephtal's Level 7 spells are ineffective and Merlin realises each of Seiryu's scales is engraved with Level 10 anti-magic crests. Ephtal switches to physical attacks with Raikiri, infuriating Seiryu that Ephtal is somehow as fast as him using sword skills he learned from Moria. Ephtal also reveals he has placed his magic under Merlin's control, so she is casting his spells for him while he focuses on his physical movement. Seiryu attacks recklessly, allowing Ephtal to stab Raikiri through one of his scales. Seiryu uses level 9 Lightning magic, but Ephtal counters with his unique Level 10 Lightning, with Raikiri acting as a lightning rod to direct the lightning past the anti-magic scales and into the flesh beneath.
12	"I Am Eftal"; Transliteration: "Kami omo Koete -I am Ephtal-" (Japanese: 神をも超えて -I am Ephtal-)	Hisashi Ishii & Kohei Takahashi	Deko Akao	Hisashi Ishii	September 17, 2026
Seiryu identifies Ephtal as the legendary Contract Breaker, who in the past defeated three other Beast Gods to end their unfair contracts with mortals. Seiryu attempts to kill Anastasia but Ephtal instinctively breaks his neck using an unfamiliar martial art. Following her investigation, Anastasia strips the Portes clan of their nobility, sentencing Abe and his father to life in prison. Investigating the Magia Burst, Ephtal learns from Merlin it was Cliff the Flame Emperor who deliberately destroyed the monolith with explosion magic, causing the death of the Ice Emperor. Merlin suspects Cliff found something on the monolith he considered valuable enough to murder another Emperor and weaken the entire world's magic. She also reveals the humiliated Mages Association is currently covering up evidence that Cliff is still alive and committing atrocities around the world. With the Earth Emperor also missing and a future battle with Cliff likely, Ephtal resolves to master the ki-manipulation martial art he used against Seiryu. Anastasia battles survivor's guilt over her sister's death. When Ephtal comforts her, she kisses him, resolving to live happily by his side. This leaves Ephtal embarrassed and Merlin highly suspicious.

== See also ==
- The Misdeeds of an Extremely Arrogant Villain Aristocrat, another light novel series with the same illustrator
