= The Misdeeds of an Extremely Arrogant Villain Aristocrat =

Japanese light novel series

- First light novel volume cover

極めて傲慢たる悪役貴族の所業 (Kiwamete Gōmantaru Akuyaku Kizoku no Shogyō)
- Genre: Fantasy, isekai
- Novel series
- Written by: Yukiha Kuroyuki
- Published by: Kakuyomu
- Original run: October 25, 2022 – present
- Light novel
- Written by: Yukiha Kuroyuki
- Illustrated by: Uodenim
- Published by: Kadokawa Shoten
- English publisher: NA: Seven Seas Entertainment
- Imprint: Kadokawa Sneaker Bunko
- Original run: June 1, 2023 – present
- Volumes: 3
- Manga
- Written by: Yukiha Kuroyuki
- Illustrated by: Micro
- Published by: Media Factory
- English publisher: NA: Seven Seas Entertainment
- Imprint: MF Comics
- Magazine: KadoComi
- Original run: September 23, 2024 – present
- Volumes: 2

The Misdeeds of an Extremely Arrogant Villain Aristocrat (極めて傲慢たる悪役貴族の所業, Kiwamete Gōmantaru Akuyaku Kizoku no Shogyō) is a Japanese light novel series written by Yukiha Kuroyuki and illustrated by Uodenim. It began serialization as a web novel on Kadokawa's Kakuyomu website in October 2022. It later began publication under Kadokawa Shoten's Kadokawa Sneaker Bunko imprint in June 2023. A manga adaptation illustrated by Micro began serialization on Kadokawa's KadoComi website in September 2024.

== Synopsis ==
One day, the protagonist wakes up and realizes that he has been reincarnated as Luke Witharia Gilbert, a villainous noble in a fantasy novel. The protagonist remembers that Luke is fated to lose to the novel's protagonist and will suffer a bad ending. In order to avoid that, he strives to get stronger.

== Characters ==
Luke Witharia Gilbert (ルーク・ウィザリア・ギルバート, Rūku Wizaria Girubāto)
Alice Lune Lonsdale (アリス・ルーン・ロンズデール, Arisu Rūn Ronsudēru)
Voiced by: Asami Seto (PV)
Mia Cline Lennox (ミア・クライン・レノックス, Mia Kurain Renokkusu)
Abel (アベル, Aberu)
Lily Acril Lumley (リリー・エイクリル・ラムリー, Rirī Eikuriru Ramurī)

== Media ==
=== Light novel ===
Written by Yukiha Kuroyuki, The Misdeeds of an Extremely Arrogant Villain Aristocrat began serialization as a web novel on Kadokawa's Kakuyomu website on October 25, 2022. It later began publication with illustrations by Uodenim under Kadokawa Shoten's Kadokawa Sneaker Bunko light novel imprint on June 1, 2023. Three volumes have been released as of May 31, 2024. The series is licensed in English by Seven Seas Entertainment.

| No. | Original release date | Original ISBN | North American release date | North American ISBN |
|---|---|---|---|---|
| 1 | June 1, 2023 | 978-4-04-113646-1 | October 2, 2025 (digital); November 11, 2025 (print) | 979-8-89561-312-2 |
1. Prologue: "The Villain Aristocrat Awakens"; 2. Chapter 1: "The Story Starts to Come Off the Rails"; 3. Chapter 2: "The Fruits of Effort"; 4. Intermission: "Chief Researcher Amelia's Diary"; 5. Chapter 3: "Aslan Magic Academy"; 6. Chapter 4: "A Brother's Enemy"
| 2 | November 1, 2023 | 978-4-04-113728-4 | February 5, 2026 (digital); March 10, 2026 (print) | 979-8-89561-313-9 |
1. Chapter 1: "Pawn"; 2. 2.5 Intermission: "Instructor Freya's Diary"; 3. Chapter 2: "The Hero and the Demon King"; 4. Chapter 3: "Inescapable Hurt"; 5. Chapter 4: "When It Rains, It Pours"; 6. Chapter 5: "Fate"; 7. Chapter 6: "An Adventurer Caught in the Cross Fire"; 8. Chapter 7: "The Back of a Hero"
| 3 | May 31, 2024 | 978-4-04-114919-5 | May 26, 2026 (digital); July 7, 2026 (print) | 979-8-89561-314-6 |
1. Chapter 1: "Motions and Maneuvers"; 2. Chapter 2: "Chaos Strikes with Lightning"; 3. Chapter 3: "A Misjudgement"; 4. Chapter 4: "You Are Like the Sun"; 5. Chapter 5: "The Empire"

=== Manga ===
A manga adaptation illustrated by Micro began serialization on Kadokawa's KadoComi website on September 23, 2024. The manga's chapters have been compiled into two tankōbon volumes as of March 2026. The manga is also licensed in English by Seven Seas Entertainment.

| No. | Original release date | Original ISBN | North American release date | North American ISBN |
|---|---|---|---|---|
| 1 | April 23, 2025 | 978-4-04-811428-8 | September 22, 2026 | 979-8-89765-944-9 |
1. "The Awakening of a Villain Aristocrat"; 2. "The Villain Aristocrat's Butler"; 3. "The Same"; 4. "The Comeback"; 5. "The Main Character"
| 2 | March 23, 2026 | 978-4-04-685133-8 | January 12, 2027 | 979-8-89863-251-9 |

=== Other ===
In commemoration of the release of the first light novel volume, a promotional video containing vocal performances and narration from Asami Seto was uploaded to the Kadokawa Anime YouTube channel in June 2023.

== See also ==
- From Overshadowed to Overpowered, another light novel series with the same illustrator
