= World Dai Star =

Japanese anime television series

- Anime key visual

ワールドダイスター (Wārudo Dai Sutā)
- Created by: Takahiro; Egg Firm; Bandai Namco Filmworks
- Manga
- Written by: Nanafuji
- Published by: Media Factory
- Magazine: Comic Alive+
- Original run: April 2, 2023 – present
- Volumes: 1
- Anime television series

Stella of the Theater: World Dai Star
- Directed by: Yū Kinome
- Written by: Yasuhiro Nakanishi
- Music by: Ryo Takahashi; Kenichi Kuroda; Tatsuya Yano
- Studio: Lerche
- Licensed by: Crunchyroll
- Original network: Tokyo MX, BS11, TV Aichi, HTB, MBS, SBS
- Original run: April 9, 2023 – June 25, 2023
- Episodes: 12
- Video game

World Dai Star: Yume no Stellarium
- Released: JP: July 26, 2023
- icon

World Dai Star (ワールドダイスター, Wārudo Dai Sutā) is a Japanese mixed-media project written by Takahiro and created by Egg Firm and Bandai Namco Filmworks, with original character designs by Mika Pikazo. An anime television series produced by Lerche aired from April to June 2023, and a mobile game titled World Dai Star: Yume no Stellarium was released in July 2023.

== Plot ==
After Dai Star stage performers exploded in worldwide popularity in the 20th century, 16-year-old Kokona Ōtori follows her dream of becoming a World Dai Star by auditioning for the Sirius theatrical troupe.

== Characters ==
=== Sirius ===
Kokona Ōtori (鳳 ここな, Ōtori Kokona)
Voiced by: Manaka Iwami
Kokona is a 16-year-old second-year high school student. She has been fascinated by the Sirius theater since she was a child and auditioned to join the company to become a World Dai Star. Kokona has a cheerful and friendly personality who can get along with anyone. She lacks confidence in her performance and skills, and often becomes timid. But she admires and strongly trusts her best friend, Shizuka, who is always so confident.
Shizuka (静香, Shizuka)
Voiced by: Ikumi Hasegawa
Shizuka is a winsome, confident person with a calm, analytical mind. She has something that Kokona Otori does not have. Shizuka is always worried about Kokona who tends to be weak, always encouraging her and giving her sound advice. The two of them work hard every day to realize their dream of becoming a World Dai Star.
Kathrina Griebel (カトリナ・グリーベル, Katorina Gurīberu)
Voiced by: Sally Amaki
Kathrina is a 16-year-old second-year high school student from Germany whose parents are both World Dai Stars. After an incident, she left her home country and went to Japan alone to pursue a career in theater.
Yae Niizuma (新妻 八恵, Niizuma Yae)
Voiced by: Maria Naganawa
Yae is an 11-year-old fifth grade elementary school student. She is an angel-like girl who treats everyone politely. Despite her age, Yae boasts overwhelming acting ability that allows her to dominate the stage in an instant, and is currently said to be the only Dai Star candidate in Sirius. Going on top of that, she is still a mass of improvement power and stoic when it comes to acting.
Panda Yanagiba (柳場 ぱんだ, Yanagiba Panda)
Voiced by: Naomi Ōzora
Panda is a 13-year-old second-year junior high school student. She acts friendly, yet a calculating realist. She is a hard-working JK girl who is envious of the natural ability of others when doing anything.
Chisa Sasuga (流石 知冴, Sasuga Chisa)
Voiced by: Rico Sasaki
Sasuga is a 13-year-old second-year junior high school student. She has a strong presence with her unique sensibility, styles and good looks, but she herself is very self-paced. Also called a mysterious character who often doesn't think about anything. She wears a green shirt with an alien pattern, because she mostly likes astrology and skateboarding.
Noa Hiiragi (柊 望有, Hiiragi Noa)
Voiced by: Nanako Mori
The vice-president of Sirius, Hiiragi the former #1 of Sirius. After the retirement, she turned down invitations from other theater companies and became a behind-the-scenes and vice-president member of Sirius, where her former teacher is. Noa began mentoring the next generation of performers.
Shamo Yamabuki (山吹 シャモ, Yamabuki Shamo)
Voiced by: Romi Park
A former World Dai Star, Shamo is a founding member and president of Sirius, leading the company for decades. After discovering Hiiragi as her successor, she retires from active duty and entrusts the future of Sirius to her. Going back to Shiriusu Yu, she serves as both a watchman and a dormitory mother.
Hana Kudo (工藤 花, Kudō Hana)
Voiced by: Yuuki Kuwahara
Hana is the director of Sirius and was originally one of its members. After leaving the company, she studied directing and returned to Sirius.
Dugong (ジュゴン)
Voiced by: Hina Kino
Dugong is an otter kept in Sirius acting as a pet and mascot.

=== Gingaza ===
Koyomi Senju (千寿 暦, Senju Koyomi)
Voiced by: Mariko Toribe
Koyomi is a 17-year-old third-year high school student. She is the daughter of the prestigious stage Senju family and Iroha's older sister. Through tireless efforts, her talent blossomed and she climbed to the rank as the young ace of Gingaza.
Ramona Wolf (ラモーナ・ウォルフ, Ramōna Uorufu)
Voiced by: Minami Tanaka
Ramona is a 17-year-old third-year high school student who came from Germany. She is a serious girl who always wants things to be clear and values ties with people more than anything else. If someone is in trouble, Ramona immediately lends a helping hand, no matter who it is.
Xue Wang (王 雪, Wan Shue)
Voiced by: Miharu Hanai
Xue is a 15-year-old first-year high school student from China who passed the international entrance exam and joined Gingaza. Her greatest strengths are her quickness to act and her high hunger spirit. This has led to her own growth and ambition. She lives a thrifty lifestyle in order to send money to her family, and is extremely strict when it comes to money.
Lilja Kurtbay (リリヤ・クルトベイ, Ririya Kurutobei)
Voiced by: Yukari Anzai
Lilja is a 17-year-old third-year high school student from Finland. She is so beautiful that she was scouted by Gingaza due to her overwhelming presence, and she herself is particular about her beauty. It even seems that she senses life in gathering people's eyes on the stage, and even wears bold costumes to make herself attractive.
Hikari Yonaguni (与那国 緋花里, Yonaguni Hikari)
Voiced by: Shino Shimoji
Hikari is a 15-year-old first-year high school student from Okinawa. With a positive mindset, Hikari loves training to the point that she doesn't mind the strict training at Gingaza. Although Hikari is troubled by cold interpersonal relationships within the theater company, she relieves stress by chatting through video distribution.

=== Gekidan Denki ===
Iroha Senju (千寿 いろは, Senju Iroha)
Voiced by: Miho Okasaki
Iroha is a 16-year-old second-year high school student who loves collecting anime and manga. She is the daughter of the stage's prestigious Senju family and Koyomi's younger sister.
Mito Shiromaru (白丸 美兎, Shiromaru Mito)
Voiced by: Reina Kondō
Mito is 16-year-old second-year high school student who acts passive and tranquil due to her complicated family environment. She has complete trust in her first friend, Iroha, and her hobbies, including cosplay, anime, and the entrance exam for Gekidan Denki.
Kamira Akiru (阿伎留 カミラ, Akiru Kamira)
Voiced by: Yuki Wakai
Kamira is a 16-year-old second-year high school student who grew up in a downtown area. She has a lot of part-time job experience and grew up in a place with many temples and shrines, so her mental age is quite high. After seeing Iroha's performance, she fell in love with theater and joined the Denki troupe, but in terms of acting, she is still in the growth stage.
Tsubomi Nekoashi (猫足 蕾, Nekoashi Tsubomi)
Voiced by: Yu Serizawa
Tsubomi is a 17-year-old third-year high school student. She believes herself to be a person with special powers, and even though she is being targeted by a dark organization, she is performing theater with determination.
Towa Motosu (本巣 叶羽, Motosu Towa)
Voiced by: Hikaru Akao
Towa is a 11-year-old sixth grade elementary school student. She is genius child actor who has been active on TV since childhood. Towa is not good at hard work, so she came to the relaxed atmosphere of Gekidan Denki to take it easy.

=== Eden ===
Hatsumi Renjakuno (連尺野 初魅, Renjakuno Hatsumi)
Voiced by: Kana Aoi
Hatsumi is a 20-year-old actor and screenwriter. She is a self-reliant and strict leader who goes her own way, disapproving acting that relies on their sense, but often takes care of her other people.
Daikoku Karasumori (烏森 大黒, Karasumori Daikoku)
Voiced by: Lynn
Daikoku is a 13-year-old second-year junior high school student. Having a dark past, she has used the "Shadow Heart" to make a performance full of emotion. Daikoky is fascinated by the charm of the representative.
Nikako Toneri (舎人 仁花子, Toneri Nikako)
Voiced by: Shuka Saitō
Nikako is a 15-year-old first-year high school student from Aogashima. Thanks to the carefree upbringing on an island rich in nature, she has a rich and sharp sensitivity.
Iruru Yorozu (萬 容, Yorozu Iruru)
Voiced by: Hibiku Yamamura
Iruru is a 17-year-old third-year high school student. She has the ability to pass all roles with a passing score. However, despite her best efforts, Iruru cannot achieve a perfect score. She is very insecure about not being able to perform perfectly, but her potential and talent are regarded and valued. Iruru is seen as a girl with a unique sense of stagecraft, which is essential in creating a solid foundation for any production.
Shigure Fudeshima (筆島 しぐれ, Fudeshima Shigure)
Voiced by: Maya Yoshioka
Shigure is a 10-year-old fifth grade elementary school student. Due to being intelligent and strong-willed, she tends to look down on other members other than Hatsumi as a rival, especially Daikoku.

== Media ==
=== Manga ===
A manga adaptation illustrated by Nanafuji began serialization on Media Factory's Comic Alive+ website on April 2, 2023.

=== Anime ===
An anime television series by Lerche aired from April 9 to June 25, 2023, on Tokyo MX and other networks. The series is directed by Yū Kinome and written by Yasuhiro Nakanishi, with Majiro handling animation character designs based on Mika Pikazo's original designs, and Ryo Takahashi, Kenichi Kuroda and Tatsuya Yano composing the music. Crunchyroll streamed the series under the title Stella of the Theater: World Dai Star.

No.	Title	Directed by (Note: Information is taken from the ending credits of each episode.)	Written by	Storyboarded by	Original release date
1	"The Girl with Dreams"; Transliteration: "Yumemiru Shōjo" (Japanese: 夢見る少女)	Yū Kinome	Yasuhiro Nakanishi	Yū Kinome	April 9, 2023
Kokona Otori is a high school student who dreams of becoming a World Die Star, the pinnacle of the theater world. She was about to give up on her dreams due to her lack of sense, but her best friend Shizuka pushes her to audition for her favorite theater company, Sirius. On the way to the theater in Sirius with her best friend Shizuka, Kokona encounters a girl, Katrina, who was lost. Surprisingly, Katrina is also a candidate for Sirius.
2	"Copying Someone Else"; Transliteration: "Dareka no Manegoto" (Japanese: 誰かのまねごと)	Kanae Komoda	Yasuhiro Nakanishi	Kanae Komoda	April 16, 2023
Kokona moved into the public bathhouse where Sirius's dormitory is located, and became roommates with Katrina. While Katrina is expressing her dissatisfaction, the two hear from Hiiragi about her new "introduction performance." The title is The Tale of the Bamboo Cutter. Kokona and Katrina will compete in an audition for the role of Kaguya, the lead role. Still, Kokona tries to get along with Katrina and talk about their dreams, but Katrina rejects her by asking her not to bother her more than necessary.
3	"Our First Play"; Transliteration: "Hajimete no Butai" (Japanese: 初めての舞台)	Noriyuki Nomata	Ohine Ezaki	Hitomi Ezoe; Yū Kinome	April 23, 2023
Kokona accidentally imitated Yae's acting when auditioning for the role of Kaguya. As Shizuka lectures her and reveals her remorse, Hiiragi comes to her and advises her that she should get to know herself as a person. Kokona didn't understand the meaning at first, but as she travels around Asakusa with Shizuka, she begins to figure out who is she and what her role is.
4	"Once Upon a Time"; Transliteration: "Ima wa Mukashi" (Japanese: いまはむかし)	Shinichiro Kimura	Yasuhiro Nakanishi	Shinichiro Kimura	April 30, 2023
Sirius' performance of The Tale of the Bamboo Cutter was a huge success, including the introduction of new performers. A welcome party will be held at Shiriusuyu, and Kokona and Katrina decide to go shopping in keeping with the mysterious tradition of newcomers being served a home-cooked dish. Meanwhile, Shizuka, who can now be seen regardless of her distance to where Kokona is, remains in the dormitory and is bombarded with questions from Panda and Sasuga. Kokona and Shizuka don't know much about "sense," but each begins to talk about how they met.
5	"A Wish"; Transliteration: "Negaigoto" (Japanese: 願いごと)	Yūichi Itō	Yasuhiro Nakanishi	Yūichi Itō	May 7, 2023
Sirius' next performance will be Aladdin and the Magic Lamp from Arabian Nights. Everyone expected Yae to play the lead role, Aladdin, but the cast members were upset when she was cast as the Genie of the Lamp. On the other hand, although Kokona gets a big role, Hiiragi points out that she doesn't have the physical strength or ability to play the leading role, and she is forced to learn the basics of acting. Meanwhile, Yae moves into Kokona's room because she is preparing for her role, and she offers to take care of Kokona.
6	"No One Is Looking at Me"; Transliteration: "Dare mo Watashi o Miteinai" (Japanese: 誰も私を見ていない)	Kanae Komoda	Ohine Ezaki	Yō Nakano	May 14, 2023
The first day of Arabian Nights ended with great success, and even Kokona, who was nervous before the performance, felt a great response. She repeatedly practices independently with Yae, and as she performs on stage after stage, her acting becomes better and better. However, Shizuka feels uncomfortable with Kokona's acting. The same was true for Panda and the rest of them. Kokona, who is supposed to be the main character, ends up being Yae's foil. Shizuka tries to convey her harsh impressions to Kokona, but...
7	"Believe in Yourself"; Transliteration: "Jibun o Shinjite" (Japanese: 自分を信じて)	Yōhei Fukui	Yasuhiro Nakanishi	Yōhei Fukui	May 21, 2023
To play Aladdin, the new acting plan Kokona came up with was a reckless gamble that involved other performers and the director, changing the way Aladdin was played for each performance. Kokona is given permission by Hiiragi to change her acting style on the condition that she gets the role in one night, and ends up being trained by Hiiragi who teaches her how to use her senses.
8	"Romeo and Juliet"; Transliteration: "Romio to Jurietto" (Japanese: ロミオとジュリエット)	Noriyuki Nomata	Ohine Ezaki	Akiyo Ōhashi; Yū Kinome	May 28, 2023
The season for Sirius's special performance Theatrical Appreciation Party for elementary school students has arrived. Based on last year's review, the title of the play was chosen to be a classic one that would get people interested in theater. However, the cast members who knew about what happened in last year's performance were worried about what play was chosen. Their worries were justified when Hiiragi announced the chosen play was King Lear.
9	"World Dai Star"; Transliteration: "Wārudo Dai Sutā" (Japanese: ワールドダイスター)	Shinichiro Kimura	Yasuhiro Nakanishi	Shinichiro Kimura	June 4, 2023
During summer vacation, Kokona and Katrina, Shizuka, and others were honing their acting skills while touring various theater companies. The three of them were supposed to go out together that day, but suddenly Katrina's mother, Therese, an active World Dice Star, came to Asakusa, so they decided to give her sightseeing information in a hurry. After witnessing her brilliance and popularity while touring Asakusa, they visit the theater in Sirius and ask Therese to show her acting.
10	"Everyone's Phantoms"; Transliteration: "Sorezore no Gen'ei" (Japanese: それぞれの幻影)	Yūichi Itō	Ohine Ezaki	Yūichi Itō	June 11, 2023
The play for the fall performance has been decided to be The Phantom of the Opera, and auditions for the role of the Phantom will be held. The five candidates were Kokona, Katrina, Yae, Panda and Sasuga. As the intense auditions are about to begin, Kokona is called to the roof of the theater by a serious-looking Katrina. Meanwhile, Shizuka is reading the script for The Phantom of the Opera and is asked by Yae to read lines with her. Each of them faced their own "phantom" and what was the answer...
11	"Our Promise"; Transliteration: "Watashitachi no Yakusoku" (Japanese: 私たちの約束)	Yōhei Fukui	Yasuhiro Nakanishi	Yōhei Fukui	June 18, 2023
The day before the audition, Kokona returns to the town where the two of them grew up at Shizuka's invitation. Shizuka says, "Because it's necessary," and asks Kokona when she aimed to become a World Dai Star. However, her memory of this place was vague for some reason. In order to remind her of the truth about how the two met and what is missing here, Shizuka begins to tell a story about a girl's quest to make her dreams come true. And that although the girl's heart is captivated by her play, she sinks into deep loneliness...
12	"The Two of Us Together"; Transliteration: "Kitto Futari de" (Japanese: きっとふたりで)	Kanae Komoda	Yasuhiro Nakanishi	Kanae Komoda	June 25, 2023
The day of the performance of The Phantom of the Opera has arrived. Shizuka, who always believed in Kokona and always supported her, is no longer here. Shizuka entrusted her dream with her and disappeared like a phantom. Although Hiiragi was concerned that she might have ended up stealing Kokona's sense of her, Kokona still stands on stage brimming with her confidence. Kokona's gratitude towards Shizuka and a little bit of regret grow as time passes, and this also affects her expressions...

=== Mobile game ===
A mobile game titled World Dai Star: Yume no Stellarium was released on July 26, 2023. The game ended its service on September 29, 2026.

=== Web radio ===
Web radio "World Daistar RADIO☆Waraji will be distributed on Nippon Cultural Broadcasting Corporation's "Super! A&G+" from December 29, 2022. The main personalities are Manaka Iwami and Ikumi Hasegawa

== Reception ==
The anime adaptation, Stella of the Theater: World Dai Star, was positively received by critics. Toni Sun Prickett of Anime Feminist reviewed the first episode, saying it more interested in the "actual process of acting", specifically how characters inhabit the minds of the characters they play, and called it "quite a pleasure", especially for those who enjoy Acting School shows, but criticized the "world-building info dumps" by the characters, and character designs of adults which "feel very little different from those of the children."

== Discography ==
=== Theme song ===
- "Wannabe Star!" (ワナビスタ！) by Sirius [Manaka Iwami, Ikumi Hasegawa, Sally Amaki, Maria Naganawa, Naomi Ōzora, Rico Sasaki]
- "Two of Us" (トゥ・オブ・アス) by Kokona Ōtori [Manaka Iwami], Shizuka [Ikumi Hasegawa]
- "Na mo Naki Koibito yo" (名もなき恋人よ; O My Nameless Lover) by Panda Yanagiba [Naomi Ōzora], Chisa Sasuga [Rico Sasaki] (ep 8)

=== Insert song ===
- "Diamond no Chikai" (ダイヤモンドの誓い; Diamond Oath) by Kokona Ōtori [Manaka Iwami] (ep 7)
- "Etoile" by Yae Niizuma [Maria Naganawa] (ep 12)
- "Farewell song" by Yae Niizuma [Maria Naganawa] (ep 12)
- "Mahou no Last Note" (魔法のラストノート; Magic Last Note) by Yae Niizuma [Maria Naganawa] (ep 7)
- "Masquerade" by Kokona Ōtori [Manaka Iwami], Yae Niizuma [Maria Naganawa] (ep 12)
- "Masquerade" by Yae Niizuma [Maria Naganawa] (ep 10)
- "New Nostalgic Friend" by Kokona Ōtori [Manaka Iwami], Yae Niizuma [Maria Naganawa] (ep 6)
- "Wasurena Uta" (勿忘唄; Forget-Me-Not Song) by Shizuka [Ikumi Hasegawa], Kokona Ōtori [Manaka Iwami] (ep 3)
- "Yumemi Tsukiyo" (夢見月夜; Dreaming Moonlit Night) by Kathrina Griebel [Sally Amaki] (eps 1,3)
- "Yumemi Tsukiyo" (夢見月夜; Dreaming Moonlit Night) by Kokona Ōtori [Manaka Iwami] (ep 1)
- "Yumemi Tsukiyo" (夢見月夜; Dreaming Moonlit Night) by Yae Niizuma [Maria Naganawa] (ep 1)
