= Oh Boy, Was I Wrong About Her =

Japanese light novel series

- First light novel volume cover, featuring Haruki Nikaido

転校先の清楚可憐な美少女が、昔男子と思って一緒に遊んだ幼馴染だった件 (Tenkō-saki no Seiso Karen na Bishōjo ga, Mukashi Danshi to Omotte Issho ni Asonda Osananajimi Datta Ken)
- Genre: Romantic comedy
- Novel series
- Written by: Yu Hibari
- Published by: Shōsetsuka ni Narō
- Original run: June 13, 2020 – July 31, 2026
- Light novel
- Written by: Yu Hibari
- Illustrated by: Shiso
- Published by: Kadokawa Shoten
- English publisher: NA: Yen Press
- Imprint: Kadokawa Sneaker Bunko
- Original run: February 27, 2021 – July 31, 2026
- Volumes: 11
- Manga
- Written by: Yu Hibari
- Illustrated by: Kina Ōyama
- Published by: Fujimi Shobo
- Magazine: Niconico Seiga (Dra Dra Flat)
- Original run: September 2, 2021 – June 26, 2025
- Volumes: 7
- Anime television series
- Directed by: Yū Hibikiba
- Written by: Deko Akao
- Music by: Ryosuke Nakanishi; Naoki Tani; Yuri Morita
- Studio: Project No.9
- Licensed by: Crunchyroll
- Original network: Tokyo MX, SUN, BS Fuji
- Original run: July 6, 2026 – September 21, 2026
- Episodes: 12
- icon

Oh Boy, Was I Wrong About Her (Note: Japanese: 転校先の清楚可憐な美少女が、昔男子と思って一緒に遊んだ幼馴染だった件, Hepburn: Tenkō-saki no Seiso Karen na Bishōjo ga, Mukashi Danshi to Omotte Issho ni Asonda Osananajimi Datta Ken; The Neat and Beautiful Girl at My New School Was My Childhood Friend Whom I Thought Was a Boy and I Played Together With, or Tenbin (てんびん)) is a Japanese romantic comedy light novel series written by Yu Hibari and illustrated by Shiso. It was serialized online from June 2020 to July 2026 on the user-generated novel publishing website Shōsetsuka ni Narō, before later acquired and published by Kadokawa Shoten under their Kadokawa Sneaker Bunko imprint in eleven volumes from February 2021 to July 2026. A manga adaptation with art by Kina Ōyama was serialized online by Fujimi Shobo via Niconico Seiga website as part of the Dra Dra Flat brand from September 2021 to June 2025, and was collected in seven tankōbon volumes. An anime television series adaptation produced by Project No.9 aired from July to September 2026.

== Plot ==
Hayato Kirishima and Haruki Nikaido were close childhood friends who lived in a rural town. However, they separated after Haruki moved away. Seven years later, Hayato now finds himself in the city where Haruki moved to and transfers to a new school. There, he meets a beautiful girl, who initially acts strange towards him. However, they quickly realize that she is Haruki, his old friend. The two rapidly reconnect and start a relationship, as Hayato finds himself discovering new feelings for Haruki he never knew he had.

== Characters ==
Hayato Kirishima (霧島隼人, Kirishima Hayato)
Voiced by: Ryōta Ōsaka (voice drama), Shun'ichi Toki (anime)
A high school student who has just transferred to Haruki's school. Seven years ago, before Haruki moved away, the two promised to always be together, but the two lost contact and did not meet again until their reunion. He develops a crush on Haruki shortly after their reunion, and tends to get slightly jealous whenever other boys flirt with her. Eventually, he confesses to her, and they get married at the end of the story.
Haruki Nikaido (二階堂春希, Nikaidō Haruki)
Voiced by: Rikako Aida (voice drama), Ikumi Hasegawa (anime)
Hayato's childhood best friend. During their reunion, Hayato did not recognize her as the Haruki of their childhood had a tomboyish appearance. She has now become a beautiful and popular girl. She still has the GameCube they used to play with when they were younger. Like Hayato, she also develops feelings for him after their reunion, but denies this every time. She is actually the daughter of the popular actress Mao Takura, having been born out of wedlock. Because of this, she aims to become an idol, wanting to make her own name in the industry independently of her familial connections. By the end of the series, she and Hayato grow up and get married, having twin children.
Himeko Kirishima (霧島姫子, Kirishima Himeko)
Voiced by: Miharu Hanai
A playful, outgoing young girl and Hayato's younger sister. She always looked up to Haruki during their early childhoods.
Minamo Mitake (三岳みなも, Mitake Minamo)
Voiced by: Natsumi Haruse
A timid but kind girl and Hayato and Haruki's classmate. Although Minamo is a member of the Gardening Club, she lacks any knowledge of plants. Other classmates confuse her and Hayato for being together, though they always deny it. Eventually, she admits she sees Hayato as a brother figure, and looks up to Haruki as her closest friend. She has a very overprotective grandfather that constantly bothers her.
Saki Murao (村尾沙紀, Murao Saki)
Voiced by: Fūka Izumi
A farmer girl from Hayato and Haruki's childhood who always had a big crush on Hayato in secret, but hid it from him behind an externally cold personality. She views Haruki as her rival for Hayato's affections, but eventually starts befriending her after realizing her feelings for Hayato are completely one-sided.
Mao Takura (田倉 真央, Takura Mao)
Voiced by: Yūko Kaida
A popular television and movie actress. She is actually Haruki's mother. Towards the end of the series, she and Haruki appear in a movie together, but she dies of illness before the film is released.

== Media ==
=== Light novels ===
Written by Yu Hibari, Oh Boy, Was I Wrong About Her was serialized online on the user-generated novel publishing website Shōsetsuka ni Narō from June 13, 2020, to July 31, 2026. The series was later acquired and published by Kadokawa Shoten as a light novel in eleven volumes with illustrations by Shiso from February 27, 2021, to July 31, 2026.

In September 2026, Yen Press announced that it had licensed the series for English publication.

No.	Original release date	Original ISBN	English release date	English ISBN
1	February 27, 2021	978-4-04-111045-4	March 9, 2027	979-8-85-544378-3
2	July 1, 2021	978-4-04-111046-1	—	—
3	October 29, 2021	978-4-04-111957-0	—	—
4	April 1, 2022	978-4-04-111958-7	—	—
5	July 29, 2022	978-4-04-112785-8	—	—
6	December 28, 2022	978-4-04-112786-5	—	—
7	December 1, 2023	978-4-04-113650-8	—	—
8	August 30, 2024	978-4-04-114976-8	—	—
9	August 29, 2025	978-4-04-116447-1	—	—
10	July 1, 2026	978-4-04-117506-4	—	—
11	July 31, 2026	978-4-04-117597-2	—	—

=== Manga ===
A manga adaptation illustrated by Kina Ōyama was serialized by Fujimi Shobo on the Niconico Seiga website under the Dra Dra Flat brand from September 2, 2021, to June 26, 2025. Seven tankōbon volumes were released from April 8, 2022, to July 9, 2025.

No.	Release date	ISBN
1	April 8, 2022	978-4-04-074501-5
2	October 7, 2022	978-4-04-074715-6
3	April 7, 2023	978-4-04-074936-5
4	November 9, 2023	978-4-04-075195-5
5	July 9, 2024	978-4-04-075521-2
6	January 9, 2025	978-4-04-075521-2
7	July 9, 2025	978-4-04-076010-0

=== Anime ===
An anime adaptation was announced during Kadokawa's "Sneaker Bunko 35th Anniversary Festa!" livestream on September 24, 2023, which was later revealed to be a television series that is produced by Project No.9 and directed by Xu Chuan Feng, with Deko Akao handling the series composition, N-Nei Kurahashi designing the characters, and Ryosuke Nakanishi, Naoki Tani, and Yuri Morita composing the music. The series aired from July 6 to September 21, 2026 on Tokyo MX and other networks. The opening theme song is "Natsu ni Kasanete" (夏に重ねて; Adding to Summer), performed by Dialogue+, and the ending theme song is "Tilt", performed by Harmoe. Crunchyroll is streaming the series.

==== Episodes ====
No.	Title	Directed by (Note: Production staff information is taken from the ending credits of each episode.)	Written by	Storyboarded by	Original release date
1	"Beginning with a Summer Day"; Transliteration: "Hajimari no, Natsu no Hi" (Japanese: 始まりの、夏の日)	Yū Aiba	Deko Akao	Xu Chuan Feng	July 6, 2026
2	"I Really Suck at Girl Talk"; Transliteration: "Koibana wa, Nigate da" (Japanese: 恋バナは、苦手だ)	Keisuke Gōda	Deko Akao	Keisuke Gōda	July 13, 2026
3	"Produced by Himeko"; Transliteration: "Himeko no, Purodyūsu" (Japanese: 姫子の、プロデュース)	N/A	Saji Komori	Kiyotaka Takezawa	July 20, 2026
4	"Small Hands, Broad Shoulders"; Transliteration: "Chiisana Tenohira, Ōkina Senaka" (Japanese: 小さな手のひら、大きな背中)	Manami Fujinomiya	Yōhei Hosokawa	Masayoshi Nishida	July 27, 2026
5	"Discipline, Young Maiden"; Transliteration: "Risseyo, Otome" (Japanese: 律せよ、乙女)	Yū Aiba	Yūya Suzuzaki	Shinichi Watanabe	August 3, 2026
6	"What About Your Camouflage!?"; Transliteration: "Gitai, Dōshita nda yo!?" (Japanese: 擬態、どうしたんだよ！？)	Kanta Shiba	Saji Komori	Masayoshi Nishida	August 10, 2026
7	"You're Special"; Transliteration: "Tokubetsu, dakara" (Japanese: 特別、だから)	Shōgo Shimizu	Deko Akao	Hideki Futamura	August 17, 2026
8	"Where the Heart Is"; Transliteration: "Kokoro no, Ibasho" (Japanese: 心の、居場所)	Keisuke Gōda	Yōhei Hosokawa	Keisuke Gōda	August 24, 2026
9	"Truly Special"; Transliteration: "Hontō no, Tokubetsu" (Japanese: 本当の、特別)	Yū Aiba	Yūya Suzuzaki	Shinichi Watanabe	August 31, 2026
10	"We Are Friends, Right?"; Transliteration: "Tomodachi, da yo ne" (Japanese: 友達、だよね)	Osamu Kamijō	Saji Komori	Masayoshi Nishida	September 7, 2026
11	"As Long As We're Together"; Transliteration: "Futari, Issho nara" (Japanese: 二人、一緒なら)	Kureha Shirai & Mizuki Sakuma	Deko Akao	Masayoshi Nishida	September 14, 2026
12	"A Fresh Start"; Transliteration: "Korekara no, Hajimari" (Japanese: これからの、始まり)	Keisuke Gōda	Deko Akao	Shinichi Watanabe	September 21, 2026

== See also ==
- The World's Least Interesting Master Swordsman, another light novel series with the same illustrator
