= Calamity of a Zombie Girl =

Japanese light novel and anime series

- The cover of the first light novel.

あるゾンビ少女の災難 (Aru Zonbi Shōjo no Sainan)
- Light novel

Aru Zombie Shōjo no Sainan
- Written by: Ryō Ikehata
- Illustrated by: Hagane Tsurugi
- Published by: Kadokawa Shoten
- Imprint: Kadokawa Sneaker Bunko
- Published: June 30, 2012
- Volumes: 2
- Light novel

Aru Zombie Shōjo no Nyūgaku
- Written by: Ryō Ikehata
- Illustrated by: Hagane Tsurugi
- Published by: Kadokawa Shoten
- Imprint: Kadokawa Sneaker Bunko
- Published: November 30, 2012
- Volumes: 2
- Original net animation
- Directed by: Hideaki Iwami
- Produced by: Katsuya Iwamoto
- Written by: Katsuya Iwamoto; Kenichi Kanemaki
- Music by: Kow Otani
- Studio: Gonzo; Stingray
- Licensed by: Crunchyroll; BI: Anime Limited
- Released: July 4, 2018
- Runtime: 80 minutes

Calamity of a Zombie Girl (Japanese: あるゾンビ少女の災難, Hepburn: Aru Zonbi Shōjo no Sainan) is a Japanese light novel series written by Ryō Ikehata and illustrated by Hagane Tsurugi. An original net animation by studios Gonzo and Stingray premiered on July 4, 2018.

== Plot ==
It begins when a group of university students break into a restricted archive on campus during summer vacation in search of hidden treasure. Inside, they discover coffins containing the mummified bodies of two Italian noble girls. One of the students removes a mysterious gem from one of the mummies and takes it back to their dormitory.

The stone's removal causes the mummified girls, who are effectively immortal undead beings, to awaken after having been dormant for many years. They begin hunting down the students across the university campus in order to retrieve the stolen stone. As the students attempt to escape and survive, they search for a way to stop the undead girls while being pursued one by one.

== Characters ==
Euphrosyne Studion (ユーフロジーヌ・シュトゥディオン, Yūfurojīnu Shutudion)
Voiced by: Saori Hayami
She is the main protagonist of Calamity of a Zombie Girl. She's the daughter of a distinguished family who died from a sudden and fatal accident, but then her father used magic to revive her as a zombie. After the source of her own life and power "stone of life" was stolen by Sayaka from the Occult Research Club, she is currently surviving with the remaining energy left in her body. She wakes up from 100 years of sleep to regain the stone of life, and she begins to follow the footsteps of the Occult Research Club. She has the strong vitality and physical strength of a zombie and she's an outstanding martial artist, but she usually restrains herself to save her remaining energy.
Alma V (アルマ・V, Aruma V)
Voiced by: Yui Ogura
Euphrosyne's servant, she's an artificial human brought to life using the same application of the magic used to revive Euphrosyne. She is Euphrosyne's lone and loyal companion, she has a strong bond with her master but she still sometimes complained about her master's lacking sense of danger and her ditzy attitude. Even though she's not as strong as her master, she can mimic the person she consumed, she also has a special ability to heal herself and her master, it's her duty to support her master in various ways.
Shuichiro Takanashi (小鳥遊 修一郎, Takanashi Shūichirō)
Voiced by: Tomokazu Sugita
A university lecturer. He knows the secrets of the stone of life and studies it independently. He pretends to be a good person, but he is actually a ruthless mad scientist who does not choose any means for his own purpose. He manipulated Sayaka who longs for him to steal the stone of life. Although he engages in violence such as killing Alma in front of Euphrosyne and embedding the stone of life in her sister Mako's body to turn her into an immortal being, in the end, Mako who has twisted affection for him suddenly ripped off his heart thus killing him.
Mako Takanashi (小鳥遊 眞子, Takanashi Mako)
Voiced by: Ryoko Shiraishi
Shuichiro's sister, she is a high school girl who is good at martial arts. She is usually a quiet girl, but she actually is as crazy as her brother. Near the end of the series, her brother implanted the stone of life into her body, gaining her fighting power and vitality that was more than equal to Euphrosyne. She's at advantage during her fight with Euphrosyne due to Euphrosyne being weakened by the lack of remaining energy, but her arrogant attitude gives Euphrosyne the chance to counterattack by trapping her with a falling giant church bell, splitting her body in half. Euphrosyne took the stone of life from the bottom half of her body but she still tried to attack with only her upper body, but in the end, Euphrosyne crushed her head.
Sayaka Kamoshida (鴨志田 沙也香, Kamoshida Sayaka)
Voiced by: Miyuki Sawashiro
A graduate student. The oldest in the occult research club. She longs for Shuichiro. After burning his companions and invading the archive, she secretly robbed the stone of life, which awakened Euphlogine and Alma. She was eventually captured after being chased by them and then used as a hostage for Shuichiro. Mako killed her by throwing a shard of glass that pierced into her head since Mako found the hostage situation troublesome.
Masahiro Abe (阿部 昌弘, Abe Masahiro)
Voiced by: Tatsuhisa Suzuki
Yui Minagawa (皆川 由衣, Yui Minagawa)
Voiced by: M.A.O
Yui knows how to do martial arts, and is very proud of her culture. She is a teenage student who is in the second year, and is eventually murdered by Euphrosyne.
Noriko Sudo (須藤 紀子, Sudō Noriko)
Voiced by: Yurika Kubo
She is the only survivor in the field trip. One of her friends are murdered by one of the zombie's deeds. Instead of Euphrosyne Studion who kills Sayaka Kamoshida and her, Mako does that, later lies and betrays Shuichiro, her elder brother, rather than Noriko Sudo's lifeless body. After Euphrosyne shoots Mako, in the following day, Alma V survives to speak with her to forget what she deeds.
Hiroshi Azuma (東 浩, Azuma Hiroshi)
Voiced by: Takahiro Miwa
Miyake (三宅)
Voiced by: Mugihito

== Media ==
=== Light novel ===
Ryō Ikehata published the two-volume series, with illustrations by Hagane Tsurugi, under Kadokawa Shoten's Kadokawa Sneaker Bunko imprint in June 2012. Ikehata published a two-volume sequel, titled Aru Zombie Shōjo no Nyūgaku (あるゾンビ少女の入学; lit. "A Certain Zombie Girl Enters University"), under the Sneaker Bunko imprint in November 2012.

No.	Title	Japanese release date	Japanese ISBN
1	Aru Zombie Shōjo no Sainan I (あるゾンビ少女の災難 I)	June 30, 2012	9784041003497
2	Aru Zombie Shōjo no Sainan II (あるゾンビ少女の災難 II)	June 30, 2012	9784041003503
3	Aru Zombie Shōjo no Nyūgaku I (あるゾンビ少女の入学 I)	November 30, 2012	9784041005804
4	Aru Zombie Shōjo no Nyūgaku II (あるゾンビ少女の入学 II)	November 30, 2012	9784041005811

=== Anime ===
Kadokawa originally announced an anime adaptation of the light novels in June 2012, and streamed a trailer for the series in July 2012. No more information about the series was revealed until April 13, 2018, when it was announced that the series would be an original net animation (ONA) by studios Gonzo and Stingray. The series is directed by Hideaki Iwami and planned by Katsuya Iwamoto, with scripts by Kenichi Kanemaki. Junichi Takaoka serves as the series' character designer and as chief animation director, the latter assisted by Takeshi Kusaka, Yuji Hosogoe, and Norimoto Tokura. Art design for the series is provided by Masayo Kobayashi, Ayumi Sugimoto is the art supervisor, and Shin Watanabe is the art director. Miyuki Mizumaki served as color designer. Digital graphic work was provided by Gen Uekura. In addition to co-producing the animation, Stingray also is in charge of photography and editing. Akira Noguchi is the series sound director and mixer, while Yasuyuki Konno is the sound designer. Masaru Kojima is the ONA's animation producer. Music for the series is composed by Kow Otani. The ONA is produced by Katsuya Iwamoto.

The ONA was streamed on July 4, 2018, and is simulcast in certain regions by Crunchyroll. The ONA was simulcast in Australia and New Zealand on AnimeLab. Anime Limited announced at MCM London Comic Con 2018 that they would be bringing the ONA onto home video in the United Kingdom and Ireland.

=== Other media ===
In November 2012, Masahiro Onai, the series' editor, announced that a live-action adaptation of the series was under consideration.
