= My Life Turned Around =

Japanese light novel series

- My Life Turned Around: After I Was Betrayed and Framed, I Won the Heart of the Most Beautiful Girl at School
- Cover of the first light novel volume

人生逆転 浮気され、えん罪を着せられた俺が、学園一の美少女に懐かれる (Jinsei Gyakuten: Uwaki Sare, Enzai wo Kiserareta Ore ga, Gakuen Ichi no Bishōjo ni Natsukareru)
- Genre: Coming of age, drama, slice of life
- Novel series
- Written by: D
- Published by: Kakuyomu
- Original run: September 4, 2023 – present
- Volumes: 309 chapters (Note: As of September 12, 2026.)
- Light novel
- Written by: D
- Illustrated by: Higeneko
- Published by: Kadokawa Shoten
- Imprint: Kadokawa Sneaker Bunko
- Original run: November 1, 2024 – present
- Volumes: 4
- Manga
- Written by: D
- Illustrated by: Ei Igakuchi
- Published by: Kadokawa Shoten
- English publisher: NA: One Peace Books
- Imprint: Kadokawa Comics A
- Magazine: Comic Newtype
- Original run: June 6, 2025 – present
- Volumes: 2
- icon

My Life Turned Around: After I Was Betrayed and Framed, I Won the Heart of the Most Beautiful Girl at School (Japanese: 人生逆転 浮気され、えん罪を着せられた俺が、学園一の美少女に懐かれる, Hepburn: Jinsei Gyakuten: Uwaki sare, Enzai wo Kiserareta Ore ga, Gakuen Ichi no Bishōjo ni Natsukareru) is a Japanese light novel series written by D, which was first published online on the writing platform Kakuyomu in September 2023.

The web novel was later acquired by Japanese publisher Kadokawa Shoten and adapted into a printed series illustrated by Higeneko, which is published under their Kadokawa Sneaker Bunko imprint since November 2024. The series also got a manga adaptation by Ei Igakuchi, which started serialization on Kadokawa Shoten's Comic Newtype website in June 2025, with the first volume being released in November 2025. The series was awarded a special prize at the ninth Kakuyomu Web Novel Awards.

== Premise ==
Second-year high school student Eiji Aono and his childhood friend Miyuki Amada were dating for half a year. One day, when Miyuki cancels a planned date with Eiji on his birthday, he decides to stroll through the city. Lost in thoughts, he arrives at the love hotel district and imagines what could have been if the date had been happening. Eiji decides to call it a day and is about to leave for home when he suddenly encounters Miyuki hand-in-hand with an upperclassman from their school, Seiji Kondō, the ace of the school's soccer club and a politician's son.

Before Eiji is able to realize what is happening, he is hit by Kondō. Kondō confronts Miyuki either to end their affair or to break up with her boyfriend. When Miyuki decides to break up with Eiji, he is shocked. Arriving at home, Eiji locks himself up in his room. When summer holidays were over, Eiji tried to confront Miyuki but is blocked by one of her friends. At school, Eiji became a victim of bullying and was ostracized by his classmates. Eiji decided to endure his situation but when the bullying was about to take over his family, he decides to talk to the teachers but stopped when he witnessed Miyuki talking to them. Eiji runs into Kondō who declares that he is the culprit for Eiji's suffering, having spread false rumors of Eiji using domestic violence against his former girlfriend. When Eiji asked Kondō why he did something like this, Kondō replied that he likes to see other people suffer.

Shocked by Kondō's true colors, Eiji decides to end it all and commit suicide by jumping from the school's rooftop. When he arrives there, he encounters an unhappy underclassman and the school's idol, Ai Ichijou, who was about to kill herself as well. Eiji ironically stops Ai from killing herself and instead they both start talking to each other. Eiji decides to skip school with Ai and leave for his mother's family restaurant. Miyuki, who still secretly cares for Eiji witnesses him leaving the school with Ai and is shocked. In reality, Kondō hurt her to make Eiji a scapegoat. A friend introduced Kondō to Miyuki when she stated to her, the relationship between her and Eiji is stagnating. At first, Kondō seemed like a friendly and helpful person. When they came closer to each other, Miyuki became emotionally dependent on Kondō.

What no one would realize is that this incident would spark a controversy even reaching the highest-level politics.

== Media ==
=== Light novel ===
The anonymous author D started writing the story as a web novel and published the first chapter on September 4, 2023 on the online platform Kakuyomu. After being an entrant at the ninth Kakuyomu Web Novel Awards where it won a special prize as well as the ComicWalker Manga Award, the story was acquired by Kadokawa Shoten, who publishes a light novel adaptation with illustrations by Higeneko under its Kadokawa Sneaker Bunko imprint. The first light novel volume was officially published on November 1, 2024.

In an interview with LN News in December 2025, D stated that the story was inspired by various cases of bullying he read about (i. e. a document published by the Ministry of Education, Culture, Sports, Science and Technology).

In August 2025, the first volume was published in South Korea by Somy Media.

==== Volumes ====
No.	Japanese release date	Japanese ISBN
1	November 1, 2024	978-4-0411-5549-3
2	May 30, 2025	978-4-0411-6153-1
3	December 27, 2025	978-4-0411-6724-3
4	May 29, 2026	978-4-0411-7457-9
5	December 1, 2026	978-4-0411-7868-3

=== Manga ===
A manga adaptation illustrated by Ei Igakuchi started serialization on Kadokawa Shoten's Comic Newtype website on June 6, 2025.. On November 10, 2025, the first volume was published in tankōbon format. On September 27, 2026, publisher One Peace Books announced that it had licensed the manga series for an English-language release; the first volume is scheduled for release on July 20, 2027.

==== Volumes ====
No.	Japanese release date	Japanese ISBN
1	November 10, 2025	978-4-0411-6921-6
2	June 10, 2026	978-4-0411-7424-1

== Reception ==
The web novel was an entrant at the ninth Kakuyomu Web Novel Awards where it won a special prize and the ComicWalker Manga Awards. D told in an interview with LN News that his story was able to gain an international readership and said that he received various comments on his works from Korean, South East Asian and Latin American readers.

On Kakuyomu, the series has been retrieved more than 41.9 million times distributed on all released chapters since its inception in September 2023. (Note: As of September 12, 2026.)

== See also ==
- 10-Nen Buri ni Saikaishita Kusogaki wa Seijun Bishōjo JK ni Seichōshiteita, another light novel series with the same illustrator
