= The World's Least Interesting Master Swordsman =

Japanese light novel series

- First light novel volume cover

地味な剣聖はそれでも最強です (Jimi na Kensei wa Soredemo Saikyō desu)
- Genre: Action, fantasy, isekai
- Novel series
- Written by: Rokurō Akashi
- Published by: Shōsetsuka ni Narō
- Original run: August 21, 2017 – present
- Light novel
- Written by: Rokurō Akashi
- Illustrated by: Shiso
- Published by: Shufu to Seikatsu Sha
- English publisher: NA: J-Novel Club
- Imprint: PASH! Books
- Original run: May 25, 2018 – October 3, 2025
- Volumes: 11
- Manga
- Written by: Rokurō Akashi
- Illustrated by: Appe
- Published by: Shufu to Seikatsu Sha
- Imprint: PASH! Comics
- Magazine: Comic PASH!
- Original run: May 25, 2018 – present
- Volumes: 12

The World's Least Interesting Master Swordsman (地味な剣聖はそれでも最強です, Jimi na Kensei wa Soredemo Saikyō desu) is a Japanese light novel series written by Rokurō Akashi and illustrated by Shiso. It began serialization on the user-generated novel publishing website Shōsetsuka ni Narō in August 2017. It was later acquired by Shufu to Seikatsu Sha who published it under their PASH! Books light novel imprint from May 2018 to October 2025. A manga adaptation illustrated by Appe began serialization on Shufu to Seikatsu Sha's Comic PASH! website in May 2018.

== Media ==
=== Light novel ===
Written by Rokurō Akashi, The World's Least Interesting Master Swordsman began serialization on the user-generated novel publishing website Shōsetsuka ni Narō on August 21, 2017. It was later acquired by Shufu to Seikatsu Sha who published eleven volumes with illustrations by Shiso under their PASH! Books imprint from May 25, 2018, to October 3, 2025.

During their Anime NYC 2019 panel, J-Novel Club announced that they licensed the light novels for English publication.

No.	Original release date	Original ISBN	North American release date	North American ISBN
1	May 25, 2018	978-4-391-15147-3	February 1, 2020	978-1-71-836948-1
2	September 28, 2018	978-4-391-15148-0	April 4, 2020	978-1-71-836950-4
3	March 29, 2019	978-4-391-15285-2	June 7, 2020	978-1-71-836952-8
4	August 30, 2019	978-4-391-15346-0	August 12, 2020	978-1-71-836954-2
5	May 29, 2020	978-4-391-15345-3	January 31, 2021	978-1-71-836956-6
6	August 28, 2020	978-4-391-15462-7	June 7, 2021	978-1-71-836958-0
7	March 5, 2021	978-4-391-15579-2	September 10, 2021	978-1-71-836960-3
8	October 1, 2021	978-4-391-15680-5	April 8, 2022	978-1-71-836962-7
9	May 6, 2022	978-4-391-15730-7	February 21, 2023	978-1-71-836964-1
10	March 7, 2025	978-4-391-16455-8	March 20, 2026	978-1-71-836966-5
11	October 3, 2025	978-4-391-16617-0	June 22, 2026	978-1-71-836968-9

=== Manga ===
A manga adaptation illustrated by Appe began serialization on Shufu to Seikatsu Sha's Comic PASH! website on May 25, 2018. The manga's chapters have been collected into twelve tankōbon volumes as of October 2026.

No.	Release date	ISBN
1	March 29, 2019	978-4-391-15286-9
2	June 28, 2019	978-4-391-15347-7
3	January 31, 2020	978-4-391-15416-0
4	August 28, 2020	978-4-391-15503-7
5	March 5, 2021	978-4-391-15580-8
6	October 1, 2021	978-4-391-15681-2
7	May 6, 2022	978-4-391-15731-4
8	October 7, 2022	978-4-391-15858-8
9	March 7, 2025	978-4-391-16454-1
10	October 3, 2025	978-4-391-16618-7
11	May 1, 2026	978-4-391-16765-8
12	October 2, 2026	978-4-391-16897-6

== Reception ==
By April 2022, the series had over 880,000 copies in circulation.

== See also ==
- Oh Boy, Was I Wrong About Her, another light novel series with the same illustrator
