= 10-Nen Buri ni Saikaishita Kusogaki wa Seijun Bishōjo JK ni Seichōshiteita =

Japanese light novel series

- First light novel volume cover

10年ぶりに再会したクソガキは清純美少女JKに成長していた
- Genre: Romantic comedy
- Novel series
- Written by: Yuki Kanzai
- Published by: Kakuyomu
- Original run: August 10, 2020 – present
- Light novel
- Written by: Yuki Kanzai
- Illustrated by: Higeneko
- Published by: Overlap
- Imprint: Overlap Bunko
- Original run: October 25, 2022 – present
- Volumes: 7
- Manga
- Written by: Yuki Kanzai
- Illustrated by: Kokuu Rokushou
- Published by: Overlap
- Imprint: Gardo Comics
- Magazine: Comic Gardo
- Original run: December 20, 2024 – present
- Volumes: 3

10-Nen Buri ni Saikaishita Kusogaki wa Seijun Bishōjo JK ni Seichōshiteita (10年ぶりに再会したクソガキは清純美少女JKに成長していた; lit. 'The Brat I Hadn't Seen in 10 Years Turned into a Pure, Beautiful High School Girl') is a Japanese light novel series written by Yuki Kanzai and illustrated by Higeneko. It originally began as a web novel posted on Kadokawa Corporation's Kakuyomu service in August 2020, before beginning publication under Overlap's Overlap Bunko imprint in October 2022; seven volumes have been released as of September 2026. A manga adaptation illustrated by Kokuu Rokushou began serialization on Overlap's Comic Gardo manga website in December 2024 and has been compiled into three tankōbon volumes as of June 2026.

== Plot ==
The series follows Yuu Aritsuki, a former salaryman who has returned to his hometown of Fujinomiya, Shizuoka after ten years away. Wondering about what happened to the bratty children he used to be close to when he was younger, he encounters a beautiful high school girl who is the subject of an advance by a man. Saving her from the man's advances, she later appears at his family's coffee shop. Although he does not recognize the girl as first, she is in fact Miya Haruyama, one of those three kids. Later, he reunites with the other two girls, Mahiru Ryūshaku and Asuka Gendouji, both of whom have also grown to be high school students.

== Characters ==
Yuu Aritsuki (有月 勇, Aritsuki Yū)
A 28-year-old former salaryman who returned to his hometown after several years away, having been unable to cope with work demands and his company's treatment of him. When he was younger, three children from the neighborhood often played with him, which at the time he found annoying but now he felt nostalgic for. Upon returning home from Tokyo, he is reunited with Miya Haruyama, one of the kids that used to play with him in the past.
Miya Haruyama (春山 未夜, Haruyama Miya)
One of the three bratty children who used to play with Yuu when they were younger. At the time, she was the brattiest among the three, but she has since grown to become a kind and beautiful woman. She has long harbored feelings for Yuu and was happy to see him return to Fujinomiya. She calls him "Yuu-nii".
Mahiru Ryūshaku (龍石 眞昼, Ryūshaku Mahiru)
One of the three bratty children who used to play with Yuu when they were younger. At the time, she had a tomboyish appearance and tanned skin. She is now a high school student and a volleyball player, while still maintaining a tomboyish appearance.
Asaka Gendouji (源道寺 朝華, Gendōji Asaka)
One of the three bratty children who used to play with Yuu when they were younger. In contrast to the other two, she had a kind and reserved personality instead of a bratty one. She had braided hair and wore glasses. When she grew older, she had straight hair but still wears glasses.

== Media ==
=== Light novel ===
Written by Yuki Kanzai, the series originally began as a web novel on Kadokawa Corporation's Kakuyomu service on August 10, 2020. It was later picked up for publication by Overlap, which began publication under their Ovelap Bunko imprint and features illustrations by Higeneko. The first volume was released on October 25, 2022; seven volumes have been released as of September 2026.

No.	Japanese release date	Japanese ISBN
1	October 25, 2022	978-4-8240-0308-9
2	April 25, 2023	978-4-8240-0464-2
3	August 25, 2023	978-4-8240-0580-9
4	April 25, 2024	978-4-8240-0793-3
5	September 25, 2024	978-4-8240-0947-0
6	April 25, 2025	978-4-8240-1147-3
7	September 20, 2026	978-4-8240-1844-1

=== Manga ===
A manga adaptation illustrated by Kokuu Rokushou began serialization on Overlap's Comic Gardo manga website on December 20, 2024. The first volume was published on April 25, 2025; three volumes have been released as of June 2026.

No.	Japanese release date	Japanese ISBN
1	April 25, 2025	978-4-8240-1164-0
2	November 25, 2025	978-4-8240-1417-7
3	June 20, 2026	978-4-8240-1700-0

== See also ==
- Jinsei Gyakuten, another light novel series with the same illustrator
