= Mika Pikazo =

Japanese digital illustrator

- ミカ ピカゾ
- Born: 1993 (age 32–33); Tokyo, Japan
- Occupations: Illustrator; Character designer
- Known for: Character designs for VTubers and video games
- Website: www.mikapikazo.com

Mika Pikazo (Japanese: ミカ ピカゾ; born 1993) is a Japanese illustrator and character designer.

She is known for her distinctive style characterized by her use of vivid, saturated colors and a preference for depicting youthful characters with proportions inspired by Japanese animation and manga.

== Early life ==
Mika Pikazo was born in Tokyo in 1993 and pursued drawing as a passion from childhood. Initially convinced she would make illustration her career, she wavered following some difficulties along the way.

After graduating from high school and still uncertain about her path, she chose to temporarily move to Brazil, a country whose cinema and music she admired, to begin a phase of artistic exploration, after which she would decide whether and how to make art her profession.

At the end of this journey, she decided to return to Japan, completing her first professional illustration commission within a year.

== Career ==
=== Early projects ===
She debuted in light novel illustration in 2015, working as a cover artist for Aisare World, published by HJ Novels.

She gained prominence through her collaboration with Kaguya Luna, a virtual YouTuber whose model she created in 2017 (concurrent with Luna's debut) and who reached one million YouTube subscribers in her first years of activity.

=== Multimedia projects ===
In 2018, she founded THE MOON STUDIO together with Kaguya Luna, a creative agency for virtual YouTubers. At the end of that year, the agency presented the KOTODAMA TRIBE project, creating seven character models and holding auditions to find corresponding "virtual talents." Before the studio's premature closure, it managed to debut the VTuber Pinky Pop Hepburn, who remained the project's only temporarily active artist. Her work in this field continued in 2021 when Hololive Production commissioned her to design Hakos Baelz, who also surpassed one million subscribers.

Also in 2018, she collaborated with Crypton Future Media on the design and illustration of Hatsune Miku for the Vocaloid concert Magical Mirai, held in Tokyo and Osaka.

=== Video games ===
In video games, she collaborated with Aniplex on character design and illustrations for the mobile game Fate/Grand Order, and handled the character design for all characters and various illustrations for Fire Emblem Engage, published by Nintendo.

=== Anime and manga ===
In anime and manga, she collaborated with artist Takahiro, creator of Akame ga Kill!, to provide consistent character design across the anime, mobile application, and manga for the multimedia project World Dai Star. In 2025, a pop-up shop for the Monogatari series opened in Tokyo offering merchandise based on her illustrations.

A similar collaboration was done the previous year with CyberAgent under Disney authorization, during which T-shirts and posters featuring illustrations of characters inspired by Mickey Mouse characters were sold.

=== Solo exhibitions and major roles ===
Among her major solo exhibitions are Revenge POP, hosted at Shibuya HZ and co-sponsored by Pixiv, and ILY Girl, which attracted approximately 35,000 visitors.

In 2025, she was appointed creative director for the project The Landscape of Emotion – In Tanka Poems and Illustration, a themed exhibition proposed by the city of Tokorozawa at the Kadokawa Culture Museum and available from February 2026, combining her large-scale works with traditional Japanese tanka poetry.
