= Kadokawa Sneaker Bunko =

Japanese light novel publishing imprint

Kadokawa Sneaker Bunko (角川スニーカー文庫, Kadokawa Sunīkā Bunko) is a light novel publishing imprint of the Japanese publishing company Kadokawa Shoten, a division of Kadokawa Corporation. It was established in 1988 and is aimed at a male audience. Some light novels published under this imprint were serialized in Kadokawa Shoten's light novel magazine The Sneaker, which was published between 1993 and 2011.

== Published titles ==
=== A ===
Title	Author	Illustrator	No. of volumes
Adam Head Dorothy	Ao Jyumonji	Suburi	3
Ai da Koi da wo Torishimaru Ore ni, Haru ga Yattekita no de Chaos	Tōka Takei	Saisai	3
Akiba Senki	Heiho Yoshikawa	Hazara Hisaka	1
Alya Sometimes Hides Her Feelings in Russian	SunSunSun	Momoko	11 (including Behind The Scenes and additional .5 volume)
Andhaka no Kaizōgaku	Ao Jyumonji	Suburi	10
Another	Yukito Ayatsuji	Noizi Ito	2 (re-release of the original novel series)
Are wa Choukouritsu no Mochako da yo!	Harunobu Niwa	Umiko	1
Aru Zombie Shōjo no Nyuugaku	Ryō Ikehata	Hagane Tsurugi	2
Aru Zombie Shōjo no Sainan	Ryō Ikehata	Hagane Tsurugi	2

=== B ===
Title	Author	Illustrator	No. of volumes
Baketero	Ao Jyumonji	Akemi Mikoto	2
Bakunetsu Tenshi X-Sun	Akira	TNSK	2
Bara no Maria	Ao Jyumonji	BUNBUN	27
Bishōjo Sakka to Mezasu Million Sellaaaaaaaa!!	Takeru Kasukabe	Mika Pikazo	1
Blood+	Ryo Ikehata	Chizu Hashii	4
Bloody Geass	Tomonori Sugihara	Riri Sagara	1
Bokura wa Minna Ikiteiru	Annagi Kurosaya	Natsu Natsuna	1
The Boy and the Beast	Mamoru Hosoda	Geko Hirasawa, Takaaki Yamashita	1
Brave Witches Prequel	Toshihiko Tsukiji	Humikane Shimada, Wirue Kusinada	2

=== C ===
Title	Author	Illustrator	No. of volumes
Canaan	Tomonori Sugihara	Kanami Sekiguchi	2
Cheat Sensei no Chōhatsu	Masaki Amane	Osa	1
Circle Crusher no Ano Ko, Boku ga Kidoku Through Kimetara Donna Kao Suru Darou	Hideaki	R_ringo	1
Class de 2-ban Me ni Kawaii Onna no Ko to Tomodachi ni Natta	Takata	Tom Osabe	4
Cocoon World	Shō Tomono	Kōji	5
Cross x Regalia	Makoto Sanda	Yūgen	7
CtG: Zero kara Sodateru Dennō Shōjo	Gangudō	Bun150	3
Cyber Arts	Tsukasa Seo	Yappen	1

=== D ===
Title	Author	Illustrator	No. of volumes
Daimaō Jamako-san to Zen-jinrui-sō Yūsha	Katsumi Misaki	Yamasan	1
Danmatsu no Millennion	Ao Jyumonji	So-bin	2
Dantalian no Shoka	Gakuto Mikumo	G-Yuusuke	8
Detamaka	Kazuyuki Takami	Chiyoko	16
Dog Days		Kiro Habane	1

=== E ===
Title	Author	Illustrator	No. of volumes
Ebiten: Kitan Kitan	SCA-JI	Kira Inugami	1
Ecstas Online	Masamune Kuji	Tsukune Taira	3
End Re End	Tsukasa Nimeguchi	Yasu	2
Enkan Shōjo	Satoshi Hase	Miyū	13
Eulen Spiegel	Tow Ubukata	Humikane Shimada	1
Eureka Seven	Tomonori Sugihara	Robin Kishiwada	4

=== F ===
Title	Author	Illustrator	No. of volumes
FLCL	Yoji Enokido		3
Free Life: Isekai Nandemoya Funtōki			1

=== G ===
Title	Author	Illustrator	No. of volumes
Game Playing Role	Shinichi Kimura	Bonnie	1
Gokudo	Usagi Nakamura	Takeru Kirishima	13
Goth	Otsuichi		1
Gundam Build Fighters	Shōta Asuka	Kiyoshi Konoyo, Suzuhito Yasuda	2
Gusha no Junction	Tsukasa Nimeguchi	Magomago	2

=== H ===
Title	Author	Illustrator	No. of volumes
Hero and Daughter	Koroku Takano	Megane Yoshizawa	1
Hige o Soru. Soshite Joshi Kōsei o Hirou	Shimesaba	booota	3
Hiiro no Gyokuza	Yūichi Takahashi	Iwamoto05	1
Himawari :unUtopial World	Tomoaki Hayashi	Manyako	4
Hime Kishi to Camping Car	Nazuna Miki	Kuinji 51-gou	2
Hoiku no Kishi to Monster Children	Masafumi Kamiaki	En Morikura	2
Horobiyuku Sekai wo Sukū Tame ni Hitsuyō na Ore Igai no Shujinkō no Kazu wo Motomeyo	Teren Mikami	En Morikura	2
Hoshifuru Yoru wa Shachiku wo Nagure	Yūichi Takahashi	Eight Shimotsuki	3
Hyōka	Honobu Yonezawa	Otohiko Takano	6 (1st edition)
Hyōryū Ōkoku	Gangudō	Umiko	2

=== I ===
Title	Author	Illustrator	No. of volumes
Ikai no Gunshi no Kyūkoku Kitan	Masayuki Kataribe	Kagayo Myōjō	3
Invision World	Kurosuke Aikawa	Kai	1
Isekai Sagishi no Consulting	Takumi Miyaji	Maro Fal	4
Isekai Toshokan e Yōkoso	Senya Mihagi	Gochō	1
Isekai Yōkai Summoner: Zenbu Yōkai no Sei	Ryōta Azuma	Azuri Hyūga	2

=== J ===
Title	Author	Illustrator	No. of volumes
Jidō Hanbaiki ni Umare Kawatta Ore wa Meikyū o Samayō	Hirukuma	Itsuwa Katō	3
Jinsei Gyakuten: Uwaki Sare, Enzai wo Kiserareta Ore ga, Gakuen Ichi no Bishōjo ni Natsukareru	D	Higeneko	4
Jitto Mitsumeru Kimi wa Datenshi	Nyao	R-ringo	1
Jōkamachi wa Kyō mo Mahō Jiken de Afureteiru	Yō Inoue	Kurihito Mutō	2

=== K ===
Title	Author	Illustrator	No. of volumes
Kaifuku Jutsushi Yarinaoshi: Sokushi Mahō to Skill Copy no Chōetsu Heal	Rui Tsukiyo	Shiokonbu	6
Kakeyuku Toshi no Moon Doll	Yōichi Nagana	Yū Rin	1
Kamase-kei Heroine Route no Ketsumatsu wo Ore wa Shiranai	Yū Kagami	Akemi Mikoto	2
Kamisama Game	Shū Miyazaki	Nanakusa	7 + 3 short story volumes
Kamisama Life		Sakura Miwabe	4
KanColle: To Aru Chinjufu no Ichinichi	Siidekei, Kazuyuki Takami, Bakagane	Koruri	1
KanColle: Zui no Umi, Hō no Sora	Yukiya Murasaki	Satoru Arikawa	3
Kariyushi Blue Blue: Sora to Kamisama no 8-gatsu	Rainy Kamitsuki	Pairan	1
Kiddy Girl-and	Hidefumi Kimura	Hidefumi Kimura	2
Kiddy Grade Pr.	Tomohiko Aoki	Hidefumi Kimura	2
Kiddy Grade	Tomohiko Aoki	Hidefumi Kimura	3
Kimi ni Shika Kikoenai	Otsuichi	Miyako Hasumi	1
Kimi no Na wa. Another Side:Earthbound	Arata Kanoh	Hiyori Asahikawa, Masayoshi Tanaka	1
Kimi to Yondome no Gakuensai	Masaki Amane	Yasumo	1
Kizuna no Hime to Seitokai Kishidan		Ponzu Yūkyū	1
Koko kara Detakereba Koi Shiae!	Touka Takei	Karei	4
Kono Kamen no Akuma ni Sōdan wo!	Natsume Akatsuki	Kurone Mishima	1
Kono Subarashii Sekai ni Shukufuku o!	Natsume Akatsuki	Kurone Mishima	16
Kono Subarashii Sekai ni Bakuen o!	Natsume Akatsuki	Kurone Mishima	3
Kōtei no Battle Throne!	Yō Inoue	Gintarō	2
Kurau wa Taberu Koto ni Shita	Ronri Fujii	TakayaKi	1

=== L ===
Title	Author	Illustrator	No. of volumes
Last Embryo	Tarō Tatsunoko	Momoko	3
Last Phoenix	Takashi Morohoshi	Manyako	1
Light Novel wo Yomu no wa Tanoshii kedo, Kaitemiru to Motto Tanoshii kamo yo!?	Tomoaki Hayashi	Ayumu Kasuga	1
Lol	Physics Point	Physics Point, KEI	2
Lucky Star: Yuruyuru Days	Touko Machida	Yukiko Horiguchi	1

=== M ===
Title	Author	Illustrator	No. of volumes
Macross Frontier	Ukyō Kodachi	Risa Ebata, Hayato Aoki	4
Madō GPX Wizard Formula	Tōka Takei	Matarō, Ōbuta	2
Magical Explorer	Irisu	Noboru Kannatsuki	4
Mahō to SkyTube de Ikiteiku	Koroku Takano	Jū Ayakura	1
Makiwari Slow Life wo Hajimemasuka? [Hai/Iie]	Shin Araki	Makoto Sajima	2
Makyō Senku no Nightingale	Katsumi Misaki	Haruyuki	1
Mamahaha no Tsurego ga Motokano datta	Kyōsuke Kamishiro	Takayaki	7
Maō Suspense Gekijō: Tsuchikemuri Dungeon, Bijin Yūsha Goroshi	Harunobu Niwa	Matarō	1
Masō Gakuen HxH	Masamune Kuji	Hisasi, Kurogin	11
Maze	Satoru Akahori		13
Meikyu!	Ryōto Morisaki	Tsubame Nozomi	2
Meitantei x Furyō x Riajū x Chijo x Kettōsha: Hannin wa Dareda!?	Yūga Amachi	Asagi Tōsaka	2
The Misdeeds of an Extremely Arrogant Villain Aristocrat	Yukiha Kuroyuki	Uodenim	3
Mismarca Kōkoku Monogatari	Tomoaki Hayashi	Tomozo	12
Mismarca Kōkoku Shinai Monogatari	Tomoaki Hayashi	Keiji Asakawa, Tomozo	1
Mobile Fighter G Gundam	Yoshitake Suzuki		3
Mobile Suit Gundam SEED	Riu Goto		5
Mondaiji-tachi ga Isekai Kara Kuru Sō Desu yo?	Tarō Tatsunoko	Yū Amano	10
Muhai no Black Courier	Sennendō Taguchi	Yūichi Kinugasa	1
Mushi-Uta	Kyouhei Iwai	Ruroo	15
Mushi-Uta bug	Kyouhei Iwai	Ruroo	8

=== N ===
Title	Author	Illustrator	No. of volumes
Nagato Yuki-chan no Shoushitsu: Toaru Ichinichi	Shin Araki	Puyo	1
Nanahoshi Kōrei Gakuen no Akuma	Taguchi Sennendō	Yujin	6
Nichijō dewa Saenai tada no Ossan, Jitsu wa Chijō Saikyō no Ikusagami	Jin Aino	Rein Kuwashima	7
Noble Witches: Dai 506 Tōgō Sentō Kōkūdan Hishō!	Hidehisa Nanbō	Humikane Shimada	6

=== O ===
Title	Author	Illustrator	No. of volumes
Omiai Shitakunakatta node, Muri Nandai na Jouken wo Tsuketara Doukyuusei ga Kita Ken ni Tsuite	Sakuragi Sakura	Clear	7
Ōoku no Sakura: Gendai Ōoku Jogakuin	Akira	Miyama-Zero	6
Ōoku no Sakura: Gendai Ōoku Jogakuin Honmaru	Akira	Miyama-Zero	1
Ore no Kyōshitsu Haruhi ha Inai	Teru Arai	Kojikoji	4
Ore no Nōnai Sentakushi ga, Gakuen Rabu Kome o Zenryoku de Jama Shiteiru	Takeru Kasukabe	Yukiwo	12
O-ri-ga-mi	Tomoaki Hayashi	2C-Galore	7
Overcomer!!	Takeru Kasukabe	Haruken	1

=== P ===
Title	Author	Illustrator	No. of volumes
Pantsu Atatamemasu ka?	Yūki Ishiyama	Bun150	1
Parapura Gakuen	Kō Kimura	Yamucha	1
Pockeloli	Touka Takei	Akane Ikegami	2

=== R ===
Title	Author	Illustrator	No. of volumes
R-15	Hiroyuki Fushimi	Takuya Fujima	11
Rakudai kenja no gakuin musō ~nido tensei shita saikyō kenja, 400-nen-go no sekai o maken de musō~	Shiraishi Arata	Uodenim	4
Rare Drop no Shihaisha	Tohru Takasaki	Salada	1
RDG Red Data Girl	Noriko Ogiwara	Komako Sakai, Meru Kishida	6
Record of Lodoss War	Ryo Mizuno	Yutaka Izubuchi	7
Reisen	Tomoaki Hayashi	Yumehito Ueda	6
Rental Bukiya Ariche	Sennendō Taguchi	Sunaho Tobe	2
Rental Magica	Makoto Sanda	pako	22
Reverse;End	Ryōta Azuma	Eihi	1
Runal Saga	Shō Tomono	Hiroyuki Nishimura	10
Ryū Matsue no Conductor	Katsuya Hayazuka	Isll	2

=== S ===
Title	Author	Illustrator	No. of volumes
Saihate no Kyūseishu	Kyohei Iwai	Bō	2
Saikyō Degarashi Ōji no Anyaku Teii Arasoi: Munō wo Enjiru SS Rank Ōji wa Kōi Keishōsen wo Kage kara Shihai suru	Tanba	Yūnagi	6
Sakurada Reset	Yutaka Kōno	Yō Shiina	7
Sangria: In the Dracuria Earth	Koroku Takano	Ryū Double	2
Saredo Bokura no Maku wa Agaru.	Kanata Kitami	Yukiko Horiguchi	2
Saredo Tsumibito wa Ryū to Odoru	Asai Labo	Miyagi	8
Satsui to Chōwa no Dust Shangri-La	Fuyuki Fuyuki	Sigma	2
Sekai Saikō no Ansatsusha, Isekai Kizoku ni Tensei suru	Rui Tsukiyo	Reia	5
Senryaku Kyoten 32098 Rakuen	Satoshi Hase	CHOCO	1
Sentō Jōsai Masurawo	Tomoaki Hayashi	Yumehito Ueda	5
Sentōin, Hakenshimasu!	Natsume Akatsuki	Kakao Lanthanum	5
Shibari Play Eiyūki	Masayuki Kataribe	Giuniu	2
Shin no Nakama janai to Yūsha no Party o Oidasareta node, Henkyō de Slow Life Suru Koto ni Shimashita	Zappon	Yasumo	8
Shinmai Maō no Testament	Tetsuto Uesu	Nekosuke Ōkuma	9 + 2 side stories
Shinwa-goroshi no Fake Master	Tamazo Yanagi	Ako Arisaka	2
Shishō Domo ni Tsugu	Masafumi Kamiaki	Hou	2
Shissō Holiday	Otsuichi	Miyako Hasumi	1
Shōkanshu wa Iede Neko	Kazuyuki Takami	Yu	4
Shūen Sekai no Rebellion	Ryuji Minokami	Takuya Fujima	3
Shūmatsu Nani Shitemasu ka? Mō Ichido Dake, Aemasu ka?	Akira Kareno	Ue	5
Shūmatsu Nani Shitemasu ka? Isogashii Desu ka? Sukutte Moratte Ii Desu ka?	Akira Kareno	Ue	5 + 1 side story
Sōkyū no Alto Ciel	Inumajin	Ponzu Yūkyū	1
Strike Witches: Otome no Maki	Hidehisa Nanbō	Hashigo Ueda, Humikane Shimada	4
Sugar Dark	Enji Arai	mebae	1
Super Cub	Tone Koken	Hiro	5
Suzumiya Haruhi series	Nagaru Tanigawa	Noizi Ito	12

=== T ===
Title	Author	Illustrator	No. of volumes
Tamakō Shakō Dance-bu e Yōkoso	Senya Mihagi	Gochō	1
Tenkō-saki no Seiso Karen na Bishōjo ga, Mukashi Danshi to Omotte Issho ni Asonda Osananajimi Datta Ken	Yu Hibari	Shiso	6
Tenkū Kangoku no Majutsu Garō	Yōichi Nagana	Minato Yasaka	5
Tensei Jūsha no Black Chronicle	Kataribe Masayuki	Asagi Toosaka	3
Testament Spiegel	Tow Ubukata	Humikane Shimada	3
Tokumei Seitokai	Akira	Reia	1
Tokyo Inroaded: Closed Eden	Kyohei Iwai	Shirabi	3
Trinity Blood	Sunao Yoshida, Kentaro Yasui	Thores Shibamoto	12
Tsurugi no Hime to Alderaban	Tomonori Sugihara	Nidy-2D-	6

=== U ===
Title	Author	Illustrator	No. of volumes
Ū-chan no Kobako	Toshiki Kazumi	Aldehyde	1
Uchiage Hanabi, Shita kara Miru ka? Yoko kara Miru ka?			1

=== V ===
Title	Author	Illustrator	No. of volumes
Vandread	Takeshi Mori		7
Violence Magical!	Tomoaki Hayashi	Mikan Ehime	3

=== W ===
Title	Author	Illustrator	No. of volumes
Who Killed the Hero?	Daken	toi8	2
Waga Homura ni Hirefuse Sekai	Hiyoko Sumeragi	Mika Pikazo	3
WizARding Game	Katsumi Misaki	Ayaki	1

=== Y ===
Title	Author	Illustrator	No. of volumes
Yakuzaishi Kyōkai no Chikensha Boshū An'nai		Mijin Kōka	2
Yamiochi Kishi ga Dungeon Hajimemashita!!	Ryōta Azuma	Yume no Owari	2
Yappa Choroin Desho!	Heiho Yoshikawa	Shinsuke Inue	2
Yokohama Dungeon	Tsukasa Seo	Yamcha	3
Yon Okuen Ateta Yūsha Loto to Ore wa Tomodachi ni Natteru	Shin Araki	Makoto Sajima	2
Yowai 5000-nen no Sōshoku Dragon, Iwarenaki Jaryū Nintei	Kaisei Enomoto	Shugao	3
Yūsha Ikkō Burari Tabi	Kigatsukeba Kedama	Horosuke	2

=== Z ===
Title	Author	Illustrator	No. of volumes
Zanma Taisei Demonbane	Jin Haganeya		6
