= The Oblivious Saint Can't Contain Her Power =

Japanese light novel series

- The Oblivious Saint Can't Contain Her Power: Forget My Sister! Turns Out I Was the Real Saint All Along!
- First light novel volume cover

無自覚聖女は今日も無意識に力を垂れ流す 今代の聖女は姉ではなく、妹の私だったみたいです (Mujikaku Seijo wa Kyō mo Muishiki ni Chikara o Tare Nagasu: Imadai no Seijo wa Ane dewa Naku, Imōto no Watashi Datta Mitai desu)
- Genre: Romantic fantasy
- Novel series
- Written by: Almond
- Published by: Shōsetsuka ni Narō
- Original run: 2020 – 2023
- Light novel
- Written by: Almond
- Illustrated by: Yoshiro Ambe
- Published by: Earth Star Entertainment
- English publisher: NA: J-Novel Club
- Imprint: Earth Star Luna
- Original run: June 16, 2021 – June 1, 2023
- Volumes: 4
- Manga
- Written by: Almond
- Illustrated by: Yona Etō
- Published by: Earth Star Entertainment
- English publisher: NA: J-Novel Club
- Imprint: Earth Star Comics
- Magazine: Comic Earth Star
- Original run: April 28, 2022 – present
- Volumes: 9
- Anime television series
- Directed by: Mitsutaka Noshitani
- Written by: Touko Machida
- Music by: Supa Love
- Studio: Magic Bus; Picante Circus
- Licensed by: Crunchyroll
- Original network: AT-X, Tokyo MX, BS11, GYT, GTV
- Original run: June 30, 2026 – September 15, 2026
- Episodes: 12
- icon

The Oblivious Saint Can't Contain Her Power: Forget My Sister! Turns Out I Was the Real Saint All Along! (Japanese: 無自覚聖女は今日も無意識に力を垂れ流す 今代の聖女は姉ではなく、妹の私だったみたいです, Hepburn: Mujikaku Seijo wa Kyō mo Muishiki ni Chikara o Tare Nagasu: Imadai no Seijo wa Ane dewa Naku, Imōto no Watashi Datta Mitai desu) is a Japanese light novel series written by Almond and illustrated by Yoshiro Ambe. It was initially serialized on the user-generated novel publishing website Shōsetsuka ni Narō from 2020 to 2023, before being acquired and published by Earth Star Entertainment under their Earth Star Luna imprint from June 2021 to June 2023. A manga adaptation illustrated by Yona Etō began serialization on Earth Star Entertainment's Comic Earth Star manga website in April 2022. An anime television series adaptation produced by Magic Bus and Picante Circus aired from June to September 2026.

== Plot ==
The Duke has two daughters: Flora, who is beautiful and a candidate to become a saint, and Carolina, who is plain and lacking talent. One day, in order to improve relations with a neighboring country, Carolina is to be married to the second prince, despite rumors that he can be brutal and cruel. After getting married, they realized that Carolina was actually the more talented sister.

== Characters ==
Carolina Sánchez (カロリーナ・サンチェス, Karorīna Sanchesu) / Carolina Ruby Martínez (カロリーナ・ルビー・マルティネス, Karorīna Rubī Marutinesu)
Voiced by: Rie Takahashi
The main female protagonist. The second born daughter of the Duke of Celestia. A kindhearted and beautiful young lady whose older sister has been belittling and abusing her, causing her to be sad and withdrawn. All of that began changing following her arranged marriage to Prince Edward, who she soon grew to love. Initially, she believed she possessed no magical abilities, but she was later revealed to have divine power that surpasses the current pope.
Edward Ruby Martínez (エドワード・ルビー・マルティネス, Edowādo Rubī Marutinesu)
Voiced by: Makoto Furukawa
The main male protagonist. The second Prince of the current Emperor of Malcosias, he is a skilled knight who uses fire magic. Due to rumors, many believe him to be a cold and ruthless man while in fact he is truly a kind and noble person. He quickly falls in love with Carolina.
Flora Sánchez (フローラ・サンチェス, Furōra Sanchesu)
Voiced by: Haruka Shiraishi
Carolina's older sister. An arrogant woman who treats her sister with contempt because their mother died giving birth to her. Considered to be a future saint, due to her skilled use of holy magic, she was livid to discover that her great power was actually because her sister's own divine power had been enhancing her own.
Theodore García (テオドール・ガルシア, Teodōru Garushia)
Voiced by: Shun'ichi Toki
Prince Edward's right hand.
Melissa Kissinger (マリッサ・キッシンジャー, Marissa Kisshinjā)
Voiced by: Inori Minase
Carolina's maid who was assigned to her following her engagement. The youngest of three sisters who was also mistreated by them.
Gilbert Ruby Martínez (ギルバート・ルビー・マルティネス, Girubāto Rubī Marutinesu)
Voiced by: Atsushi Tamaru
Edward's older brother and the first Prince. Due to a magical ailment, he was forced to remain confined within a holy barrier that lessens his symptoms. Following the revelation of Carolina's divine powers, she was able to cure his condition.
Owen Klein (オーウェン・クライン, Ōuen Kurain)
Voiced by: Nobuhiko Okamoto
Carolina's bodyguard. The illegitimate son of a noble who was almost killed by his father, he grew to be a warrior who vows to protect Carolina.
Raymond Sánchez (レイモンド・サンチェス, Reimondo Sanchesu)
Voiced by: Mitsuru Miyamoto
The Duke of Celestia and father of Flora and Carolina.
Nathan Phillips (ネイサン・フィリップス, Neisan Firippusu)
Voiced by: Kosuke Toriumi
The King of Celestia.
Iris (イリス, Irisu)
Voiced by: Hana Tamegai
Flora's maid.
Eric Ruby Martínez (エリック・ルビー・マルティネス, Erikku Rubī Marutinesu)
Voiced by: Hiroki Tōchi
The Emperor of the Malcosian Empire and father of Edward and Gilbert.
Vanessa Ruby Martínez (ヴァネッサ・ルビー・マルティネス, Vanessa Rubī Marutinesu)
Voiced by: Sayaka Ohara
The Empress of the Malcosian Empire and mother of Edward and Gilbert.

== Media ==
=== Light novel ===
Written by Almond, The Oblivious Saint Can't Contain Her Power: Forget My Sister! Turns Out I Was the Real Saint All Along! was initially serialized on the user-generated novel publishing website Shōsetsuka ni Narō from 2020 to 2023. It was later acquired and published by Earth Star Entertainment under their Earth Star Luna imprint featuring illustrations by Yoshiro Ambe, in four volumes from June 16, 2021, to June 1, 2023.

During their panel at Anime NYC 2023, J-Novel Club announced that they have licensed the series for English publication.

No.	Original release date	Original ISBN	North American release date	North American ISBN
1	June 16, 2021	978-4-8030-1530-0	February 12, 2024	978-1-7183-3042-9
2	December 15, 2021	978-4-8030-1592-8	May 3, 2024	978-1-7183-3044-3
3	July 1, 2022	978-4-8030-1664-2	July 26, 2024	978-1-7183-3046-7
4	June 1, 2023	978-4-8030-1798-4	October 31, 2024	978-1-7183-3048-1

=== Manga ===
A manga adaptation illustrated by Yona Etō began serialization on Earth Star Entertainment's Comic Earth Star manga website on April 28, 2022, with its chapters collected into nine tankōbon volumes as of September 2026, which will end with the release of its tenth and final volume. The manga adaptation is also licensed in English by J-Novel Club.

No.	Original release date	Original ISBN	North American release date	North American ISBN
1	October 12, 2022	978-4-8030-1697-0	November 22, 2023	978-1-7183-8476-7
2	March 10, 2023	978-4-8030-1751-9	February 5, 2025	978-1-7183-8477-4
3	September 13, 2023	978-4-8030-1832-5	April 30, 2025	978-1-7183-8478-1
4	March 13, 2024	978-4-8030-1916-2	July 9, 2025	978-1-7183-8479-8
5	September 12, 2024	978-4-8030-2004-5	October 1, 2025	978-1-7183-8480-4
6	March 12, 2025	978-4-8030-2087-8; 978-4-8030-2088-5 (SE)	December 24, 2025	978-1-7183-8481-1
7	October 10, 2025	978-4-8030-2193-6	August 12, 2026	978-1-7183-8482-8
8	July 10, 2026	978-4-8030-2335-0	—	—
9	September 11, 2026	978-4-8030-2371-8	—	—

=== Anime ===
An anime television series adaptation was announced during the "Earth Star Novel 10th Anniversary Summer Festival" event on July 19, 2025. It is produced by Magic Bus and Picante Circus, and directed by Mitsutaka Noshitani, with series composition handled by Touko Machida, characters designed by Taihei Nagai, and music composed by Supa Love. The series aired from June 30 to September 15, 2026, on AT-X and other networks. The opening theme song is "Windmaker", performed by Kaya, while the ending theme song is "Unknown Me" (アンノウンミー, Annōn Mī), performed by Utahime Dream All Stars. Crunchyroll streamed the series.

==== Episodes ====
No.	Title	Directed by	Written by	Storyboarded by	Original release date
1	"The Disgrace of the Ducal House of Sanchez"; Transliteration: "Sanchesu Kōshaku-ka no Dekisokonai" (Japanese: サンチェス公爵家の出来損ない)	Mitsutaka Noshitani	Touko Machida	Mitsutaka Noshitani	June 30, 2026
Within the Celestia Kingdom's sole Ducal House, the celebrated Sanchez family, the talented future Saint Flora secretly bullies her plain, unskilled sister Carolina, blaming her for their mother Karen's death in childbirth. King Nathan reveals that Celestia must provide a bride for Prince Edward, an infamously beastly warrior who has even slaughtered women and children, to settle an accidental diplomatic insult to Edward's aunt, sister of the current Emperor. As the highest-ranking noble family, he has chosen the Sanchez's to provide the bride. As a future Saint, Flora is out of the question, leaving Carolina the only possible candidate. Unexpectedly, the Duke offers to refuse the engagement if it causes Carolina unhappiness. Realizing Flora lied about their father's hatred for her over Karen's death, Carolina feels empowered by his genuine love and accepts the marriage to save the kingdom. After bonding with her father over memories of Karen and enduring one final, futile insult from Flora, Carolina prepares to depart, excited to never see Flora again. Though expecting a secret escort of Edward's Pyreborn knights, she is shocked to find Edward has arrived personally, appearing far more sinister than the rumours suggested.
2	"The Bloodthirty Second Prince"; Transliteration: "Ikusazuki no Dai-ni Ōji" (Japanese: 戦好きの第二皇子)	Takeyuki Sadohara	Touko Machida	Shin Min-Seop	July 7, 2026
Carolina is pleasantly surprised by Edward's respectful treatment. En-route to the Empire, his assistant Vice-Commander Theodore reveals their engagement will be announced in two weeks during the Founder's Fete, followed by their marriage two weeks afterwards. During a bandit attack, Carolina meets knight Collett. When Collett is injured, Carolina's earnest prayers inexplicably boost a healing mage's power, fully curing him. This baffles Carolina, whose childhood aptitude test showed no magic. Edward and Theodore note that several knights, including Edward, experienced similar magical surges while Carolina was praying. Upon arriving in the capital city Malcosias, Carolina meets Edward's parents, Lightning Emperor Eric and Frost-Witch Empress Vanessa. Though intimidated, she finds them warmly enthusiastic about finally having a daughter. Carolina is assigned a maid, Marisa, and a bodyguard, Owen. As bridal lessons begin, tutors praise Carolina as an excellent student, contradicting her upbringing where she was deemed slow compared to Flora. Theodore explains childhood aptitude tests are highly unreliable, and advises she be retested after the wedding. He also notes a strange lack of monster attacks during their journey. Carolina mentions monsters never approach her homeland either, which Theodore attributes to Flora's saintly powers. Later, an assassin targets the terrified Carolina, but Owen and Collett narrowly save her life.
3	"Founder's Day Fete"; Transliteration: "Kenkoku Kinen Pātī" (Japanese: 建国記念パーティー)	Chen Jun Xi	Atsushi Nishiyama	Daiki Maezawa	July 14, 2026
A letter from Raymond to Carolina details recent crises in Celestia: failing crops, monster attacks, and a plague. Flora is furious her holy magic has weakened just before the crucial Saint Trials that determine her suitability to become the official Saint. During the Founder's Fete, Eric announces their engagement, and Carolina meets Edward's older brother, Gilbert. Gilbert reveals he has Mana Hypersensitivity, and is currently being kept alive by the Pope's healing spells embedded in the palace walls, which he cannot travel outside of. Meanwhile, Owen captures an assassin who falsely implicates Raymond. Carolina notes this is impossible, as the assassin is from East Gotia, which has no political or economic ties to Celestia or Malcosia. Theodore explains the imperial succession unrest: Gilbert is popular but too ill to rule, while Edward has no interest in the throne, despite rivals smearing his military record to portray him as a murderous beast. Embarrassed by his blunder, Owen, the runaway illegitimate son of Duke Klein, resigns. Carolina gifts him an unfinished embroidered handkerchief, a knightly symbol of faith in his future, and shares her own troubled past with Flora, inspiring Owen to resume his duties. Flora realizes her powers began to decline after Carolina left, while opportunistic church factions plan to exploit her weakness.
4	"Red Eyes and Ruby"; Transliteration: "Akai Hitomi to Rubī" (Japanese: 赤い瞳とルビー)	Yuki Tsunohara	Mitsuyo Suenaga	Lee Jeon-Jong	July 21, 2026
Disappointed her father cannot attend her wedding, Edward changes the ceremony so he and Carolina walk down the aisle together. The ceremony goes perfectly, and Carolina moves into the Emerald Palace. Edward and Carolina depart for Count Kissinger's mansion for their honeymoon, joined by Theodore and Marisa. However, Kissinger is Marisa's father and she is uneasy returning to her childhood home. Theodore explains that he was once politically engaged to Marisa's cruel older sister, Marielle, but broke it off due to Marielle's dangerous obsession with him, later becoming engaged to Marisa instead. Marielle sends a fake message of a monster attack to draw Edward and Theodore away and corners Marisa to demand she break off her engagement to Theodore. Carolina defends Marisa, prompting Marielle to insult Carolina as a country bumpkin married to a beast. Marisa slaps Marielle, and a furious Edward nearly executes Marielle for treason. As she officially lied to a Pyreborn Knight about a monster attack and insulted a Prince and Princess, Kissinger banishes Marielle to a convent for life. A grateful Marisa thanks Carolina for her support. Meanwhile, Flora's power continues to decline and she blames Carolina. Theodore arranges for Carolina to retake her magical aptitude test.
5	"Hidden Divinity"; Transliteration: "Himerareta Shinseiryoku" (Japanese: 秘められた神聖力)	Yūki Kusakabe	Atsushi Nishiyama	Daiki Maezawa	July 28, 2026
At her aptitude test, Pope Melvin reveals Carolina lacks Arcane Power because she actually possesses overflowing Divinity, a Holy Magic that heals her surroundings and boosts others' magic without her being aware of it. In Celestia, Flora fails her Saint Trial in front of Archbishop Jonathon, a corrupt, greedy man. Realizing Carolina's ability holds major political consequences, Edward and Melvin agree to keep it hidden for now. Later, repulsed by a sapphire resembling Flora's eyes, Carolina confides in Edward that Flora acts saintly but has the personality of a monster, and is the only person she truly hates. Carolina realises if Gilbert is merely being kept alive by Melvin's Divinity, then her own might be able to cure him. She begins magic training with Theodore but due to political pressure, Eric is forced to ask Carolina to begin treating Gilbert straight away so he can attend a ball in the Sun Kingdom, which will be vital if he wishes to remain heir to the throne. The treatment goes well and Gilbert is able to safely teleport to the Sun Kingdom. Beforehand, he admits to Carolina he had given up hope of becoming Emperor, but now feels certain he will eventually be cured.
6	"First Prince Gilbert"; Transliteration: "Dai-ichi Ōji Girubāto" (Japanese: 第一皇子ギルバート)	Takeyuki Sadowara	Atsushi Nishiyama	Mitsutaka Noshitani	August 4, 2026
Gilbert's illness returns, but his questionable behaviour, such as delaying treatments in favour of long talks with Carolina and insisting on calling her "Mistress", worries her deeply. Theodore warns Carolina that their private time together has fuelled rumours of an affair and hurt someone important. He also urges Edward to stop hiding his true feelings for the sake of the future of his marriage. Deciding to join them for Gilbert's first trip outdoors, Edward watches in fury as Gilbert collapses, grabs Carolina, and smirks at him. Edward pulls Carolina away, offering a divorce if she prefers Gilbert, but confessing his deep love for her. Carolina reciprocates, and they affectionately adopt the names Ed and Lina. Theodore confronts Gilbert, who admits he is cured and was merely pretending to be ill to steal Carolina. Despite the trickery, Theodore notes that it pushed the usually reserved Edward closer to Carolina. Gilbert later apologizes and confesses his feelings to Carolina in front of Edward. She rejects him, and Edward forgives him, allowing him to move on. Meanwhile in Celestia, Jonathon presents King Nathan and Raymond with evidence Flora's failure stems from Carolina's departure. Discovering that Carolina possesses Divinity, Jonathon insists they must retrieve Carolina.
7	"The Waver of the Perfect Young Lady"; Transliteration: "Kanpeki Reijō no Yuragi" (Japanese: 完璧令嬢の揺らぎ)	Sota Shiro	Mitsuyo Suenaga	Shin Min-Seop	August 11, 2026
At Countess Herbert's tea party, Carolina encounters the rude Monica Arendt, one of Gilbert's supporters whose Kingdrake Knights are rivals of Edward's Pyreborn Knights. Raymond warns them Jonathon plans to fake an Oracle revelation naming Carolina as Celestia's true Saint so he can demand her return to Celestia, which is recognised as one of the few Holy Nations that can protect Saints. To counter this, Theodore and Gilbert plan to expose Jonathon to the Inquisition, while Carolina proposes the Empire also become a Holy Nation. Pope Melvin backs the proposed Saint System, though it will require approval from the Council of Nobles and the establishment of public Saint Trials, where Carolina will have to prove herself against other Saint candidates. When Jonathon visits to try manipulate Carolina personally, she follows Theodore's instructions to delay answering. Gilbert infiltrates Celestia to investigate and becomes convinced Jonathon murdered Claudia, a former Saint whom King Nathan loved, and had threatened to expose Jonathon's corruption. Guilt-ridden that at the time he was powerless to demand a proper murder investigation, Nathan asks Gilbert to prove Jonathon murdered Claudia. Concurrently, Flora accepts she may never become Saint and vows to ruin Carolina's life.
8	"Jonathon's Scheme"; Transliteration: "Jonasan no Takurami" (Japanese: ジョナサンの企み)	Masayuki Matsumoto	Atsushi Nishiyama	Daiki Maezawa	August 18, 2026
Carolina, Edward, and Theodore prepare to propose the Lumina Divinae Faith Council to the Assembly of Nobles. To secure support, Marisa visits her sister Maria, wife of Duke Blake. Maria, another former childhood bully, agrees to try convince Blake to atone for her past. To guarantee she tries, Marisa threatens to expose Maria's past misdeeds to Blake, which could trigger a divorce. Owen reconciles with his brother Drake, the new Baron Klein, who apologizes for ignoring Owen's past abuse and pledges his support. Touched by their efforts, Carolina appreciates both Marisa and Owen facing their estranged siblings to help her. The Assembly unanimously approves the Lumina Divinae, but imposes an additional Selection Exam alongside the Saint Trials. Infuriated by the news, Jonathon plots revenge. He gives Monica Arendt a secret grey medicine to double her mana, instructing her to defeat Carolina in the exam and strip her of the Saint title. Intrigued, Monica accepts and alerts Jonathon that he is under investigation, hoping her victory will allow her to arrange a marriage with Gilbert. Meanwhile, Jonathon considers using a far more dangerous black medicine on another noblewoman, unaware that Gilbert has already gathered enough evidence for the Inquisition to arrest him.
9	"The Exposed Sin"; Transliteration: "Abakareta Tsumi" (Japanese: 暴かれた罪)	Mitsutaka Noshitoya	Mitsuyo Suenaga	Lee Jeon-Jong	August 25, 2026
Gilbert presents evidence to Melvin showing Jonathon stole church funds and murdered Claudia to cover it up. The selection exam begins, with Carolina, Monica, Violet, and Lillian tasked with healing broken bones. Monica relies on healing magic, but Carolina uses Divinity to heal her volunteer instantly, taking first place while Monica finishes second. In the next test, purifying muddy water, Monica uses Jonathon's grey medicine but only makes it halfway through while Carolina purifies all her water effortlessly and wins. Enraged, Monica attempts to murder Carolina on stage, but Edward blasts her away. Monica is devastated when it is Gilbert who has her arrested. Jonathon is captured at Monica's home. During his Inquisition, Priestess Vanessa and Paladin Nils confess Jonathon ordered Claudia's murder, backed by handwritten documents. Jonathon is sentenced to life imprisonment. To spare Monica from execution for treason, her father Duke Ricardo trades terrorist intelligence to downgrade her sentence, so instead she is stripped of her noble title and sent to prison as a commoner. Meanwhile, Flora learns she will represent Celestia against Carolina in the upcoming Lumina Divinae Saint Trials. Desperate to win, Flora considers extreme measures. Carolina hopes to finally confront Flora, so Theodore grants permission to unleash her full Divinity during the trials, instead of holding back like she did in the exam.
10	"Saintly Trials"; Transliteration: "Seijo Shiken" (Japanese: 聖女試験)	Yusuke Onoda	Mitsuyo Suenaga	Chafik	September 1, 2026
Flora arrives behaving as the ideal guest, though Carolina and Edward easily see through her fake smile. Feeling secure beside Edward, Carolina realizes she feels complete indifference toward Flora, who appears visibly ill. At the Saints' Trials, Carolina and Flora join 21 other candidates across three challenges. In the first task, purifying soiled towels, Carolina wins first place with 318 towels, while Flora barely secures fourth with 79. Suffering severe chest pains from the black medicine Jonathon gave her, Flora continues to deteriorate. The second trial tests healing abilities, awarding points based on injury severity. Desperate to humiliate Carolina before the medicine kills her, Flora ignores coughing up blood and targets the most severely injured knights for maximum points. Carolina instead heals every knight she can, even after time expires. Flora scores 123 points, while Carolina earns over 300. In the final trial, candidates must purify ink in basins to retrieve rose pendants, scored on speed and robe cleanliness. Flora recklessly forces her magic, grabbing her pendant first, but vomits blood and collapses. Furious that Carolina rushes to help rather than being traumatized by her death, Flora sees a vision of her mother.
11	"The Perfect Young Lady's Resolve"; Transliteration: "Kanpeki Reijō no Ketsui" (Japanese: 完璧令嬢の決意)	Takeyuki Sadohara	Touko Machida	Mitsutaka Noshitani	September 8, 2026
With what she believes is her last breath, Flora blames Carolina for everything. While healing Flora, Carolina uses enough Divinity that she sprouts six angel wings before the world. Flora is hospitalized while Carolina is named Saint and given the Staff of Sainthood. Theodore deduces Flora risked her life using forbidden medicine to hide her weakness and secure the Saint title. Choosing mercy, Carolina refrains from officially punishing Flora for cheating. Flora awakens furious that Carolina saved her and avoided the guilt of letting her die. Raymond apologizes for Flora's actions and requests punishment as the Imperial Princess. Carolina decrees Flora be forcefully re-educated on proper behaviour. Raymond is relieved Flora avoided execution. Meanwhile, Edward considers it the ultimate punishment: forcing Flora to owe her life to the person she hates most. Raymond blames himself for missing Flora's deep-seated resentment over their mother Karen's death, yet Flora remains determined to ruin Carolina's life. Vanessa designs Carolina's white-and-silver Saint gown. Theodore coordinates with the church to assign the Paladin Order and Pyreborn Knights as Carolina's guards. For her first official duty, Carolina must visit all kingdoms, beginning with Celestia.
12	"Executing The Revenge"; Transliteration: "Fukushū no Suikō" (Japanese: 復讐の遂行)	Mitsutaka Noshitani	Touko Machida	Mitsutaka Noshitani	September 15, 2026
Eric names Gilbert Crown Prince. Teodore teleports Carolina, Edward, Owen, and Marisa to Celestia, where King Nathan and Raymond welcome them. Raymond reveals Flora has secluded herself since returning. As part of Celestia's Noel celebrations, Carolina performs a Lighting ceremony. Unaware Flora hides nearby with a gun. Her maid Iris tries to intervene, but Flora hits her. As Carolina lights the Noel Brazier and blesses the city, Flora prepares to shoot her, but hesitates when she notices Carolina's smile mirrors their mother's. Flora realizes she masked her grief over Karen's death with anger toward Carolina. Unable to shoot, Flora attempts suicide, but Raymond stops her. She confesses her attempted murder, apologizes to Carolina and asks for punishment, so Carolina sentences her to protect Celestia in their mother's memory. After returning to the Empire, Carolina receives a letter from Flora, who is working to succeed Raymond as Duchess Sanchez and Chancellor to fulfil her promise. Carolina rewards Marisa with a hand-knitted scarf and presents Owen with his promised completed handkerchief. At the Noel party, Eric publicly announces Gilbert's succession while Carolina and Edward share a kiss under the fireworks.

== Reception ==
The series won the encouragement award at the 2nd Earth Star Novel Award in 2020.
