= Hero Without a Class =

Japanese light novel series and its adaptations

- Hero Without a Class: Who Even Needs Skills?!
- First light novel volume cover

無職の英雄 別にスキルなんか要らなかったんだが (Mushoku no Eiyū: Betsu ni Sukiru Nanka Iranakattan da ga)
- Genre: Fantasy
- Novel series
- Written by: Shichio Kuzu
- Published by: Shōsetsuka ni Narō
- Original run: November 15, 2017 – May 15, 2020
- Light novel
- Written by: Shichio Kuzu
- Illustrated by: Yumehito Ueda
- Published by: Earth Star Entertainment
- Imprint: Earth Star Novel
- Original run: July 16, 2018 – June 15, 2019
- Volumes: 4
- Manga
- Written by: Shichio Kuzu
- Illustrated by: Akio Nanae
- Published by: Earth Star Entertainment
- English publisher: NA: One Peace Books
- Imprint: Earth Star Comics
- Magazine: Comic Earth Star
- Original run: November 12, 2018 – present
- Volumes: 11
- Anime television series
- Directed by: Kaoru Yabana
- Written by: Chabo Higurashi
- Music by: Kento Asahina
- Studio: Studio A-Cat
- Licensed by: Sentai Filmworks: SA/SEA: Medialink
- Original network: Tokyo MX, BS Fuji, AT-X
- Original run: October 1, 2025 – December 17, 2025
- Episodes: 12
- icon

Hero Without a Class: Who Even Needs Skills?! (無職の英雄 別にスキルなんか要らなかったんだが, Mushoku no Eiyū: Betsu ni Sukiru Nanka Iranakattan da ga; "The Unemployed Hero Does Not Need Something Like Skills") is a Japanese light novel series written by Shichio Kuzu and illustrated by Yumehito Ueda. It was serialized online from November 2017 to May 2020 the user-generated novel publishing website Shōsetsuka ni Narō. It was later acquired by Earth Star Entertainment, who published four volumes from July 2018 to June 2019 under their Earth Star Novel imprint. A manga adaptation with art by Akio Nanae has been serialized online via Earth Star Entertainment's Comic Earth Star website since November 2018 and has been collected in eleven tankōbon volumes. An anime television series adaptation produced by Studio A-Cat aired from October to December 2025.

== Plot ==
In a world where people have "Classes" that grant them "Skills", Arel is found to be "Classless". Without a Class, he can never have Skills bestowed on him by the Goddess. However, he finds that he can learn and replicate other people's Skills by seeing them used enough times, and even adapt and improve upon them.

== Characters ==
Arel (アレル, Areru)
Voiced by: Kensho Ono (Japanese); Jack Stansbury (English)
The son of two legendary heroes, the "Sword Princess" Farah and the "Magic King" Leon. Despite this, he is "Classless", unable to get any skills bestowed on him by the Goddess.
Reiner (ライナ, Raina)
Voiced by: Saori Hayami (Japanese); Monica Rial, Shannon Emerick (young) (English)
A girl Arel knew as a child, who declares herself his rival after he beat her in a swordfight. They meet again when he joins the Dragon Fang guild. She later journeys to Arel's village, following him after he leaves Dragon Fang, and becomes Farah's disciple in both swordsmanship and domestic skills.
Lilia (リリア, Riria)
Voiced by: Sumire Uesaka (Japanese); Juliet Simmons (English)
A member of the Dragon Fang guild and daughter of its leader, she gets Arel to join up. Later, she becomes enamored of Arel and keeps trying to seduce him, hoping to get him to marry her, even though he repeatedly demonstrates his lack of interest.
Kufa (クーファ, Kūfa)
Voiced by: Rumi Okubo
Farah (ファラ, Fara)
Voiced by: Mai Nakahara (Japanese); Ginger Sue (English)
Arel's mother, once a legendary adventurer known as the "Sword Princess" (although she is actually a "Sword Goddess"). She trains Arel in swordsmanship and later Rainer in both swordsmanship and domestic skills.
Leon (レオン, Reon)
Voiced by: Shinya Takahashi (Japanese); Jeremy Gee (English)
Arel's father, once a legendary adventurer known as the "Magic King". When Arel reveals that he can manifest mana, Leon teaches him the rudiments of magic.
Astea (アステア, Asutea)
Voiced by: Karin Isobe (Japanese); Hilary Haag (English)
Mila (ミラ, Mira)
Voiced by: Yuka Iguchi
Kaito (カイト)
Voiced by: Shōya Chiba
Colette (コレット, Koretto)
Voiced by: Yui Ogura

== Media ==
=== Light novels ===
Written by Shichio Kuzu, Hero Without a Class was initially serialized on the user-generated novel publishing website Shōsetsuka ni Narō from November 15, 2017, to May 15, 2020. It was later acquired by Earth Star Entertainment who published four light novel volumes with illustrations by Yumehito Ueda from July 16, 2018, to June 15, 2019.

No.	Release date	ISBN
1	July 16, 2018	978-4-8030-1204-0
2	November 15, 2018	978-4-8030-1248-4
3	March 15, 2019	978-4-8030-1274-3
4	June 15, 2019	978-4-8030-1303-0

=== Manga ===
A manga adaptation illustrated by Akio Nanae began serialization in Earth Star Entertainment's Comic Earth Star online magazine on November 12, 2018. Its chapters have been compiled into eleven tankōbon volumes as of October 2026. The manga adaptation is licensed in North America by One Peace Books.

No.	Original release date	Original ISBN	English release date	English ISBN
1	June 12, 2019	978-4-8030-1298-9	September 17, 2024	978-1-6427-3382-2
2	March 12, 2020	978-4-8030-1395-5	October 29, 2024	978-1-6427-3389-1
3	September 12, 2020	978-4-8030-1447-1	May 13, 2025	978-1-6427-3444-7
4	March 12, 2021	978-4-8030-1497-6	August 7, 2025	978-1-6427-3488-1
5	October 12, 2021	978-4-8030-1447-1	February 17, 2026	978-1-6427-3542-0
6	May 12, 2022	978-4-8030-1642-0	—	—
7	October 12, 2023	978-4-8030-1846-2	—	—
8	June 12, 2024	978-4-8030-1959-9	—	—
9	March 12, 2025	978-4-8030-2090-8	—	—
10	October 10, 2025	978-4-8030-2195-0	—	—
11	October 9, 2026	978-4-8030-2391-6	—	—

=== Anime ===
An anime television series adaptation was announced on October 5, 2023. It is produced by Studio A-Cat and directed by Kaoru Yabana, with series composition by Chabō Higurashi and Kento Asahina composing the music. The series aired from October 1 to December 17, 2025, on Tokyo MX and other networks. The opening theme song is "Reincarnation", performed by Kaya, while the ending theme song is "Kiseki Nanka Iranai" (奇跡なんかいらない; 'I Don't Need Something Like a Miracle'), performed by members of the music group Utahime Dream. Sentai Filmworks licensed the series in North America for streaming on Hidive. Medialink licensed the series in South and Southeast Asia for streaming on Ani-One Asia's YouTube channel.

==== Episodes ====
No.	Title	Directed by (Note: Production staff information is taken from the ending credits of each episode.)	Written by	Storyboarded by	Original release date (Note: Episodes are released on Abema, Hidive and Ani-One Asia a week before their televised airings.)
1	"Judged Classless"; Transliteration: "Mushoku Senkoku" (Japanese: 無職宣告)	Kaoru Yabana & Jiang Chenjun	Chabō Higurashi	Kaoru Yabana	October 1, 2025
Arel, the son of two legendary hero parents, is revealed as classless during his coming of age ceremony. Despite this, he is unbothered and adamant that training and hard work are enough for him to better his skills, though his overbearing family and creepy older sister remain worried. Some time after, he spars against kids his age who were blessed with the Swordsman class and readily defeats them, before losing to a kid one year older, Reiner. After training even harder to best Reiner, he encounters him the woods being attacked by a hobgoblin and rescues him. They then have a rematch where Arel reveals he's learned Reiner's Twin Slash ability and even improved on it.
2	"Bresgia, City of Swords"; Transliteration: "Ken no Toshi Buresugia" (Japanese: 剣の都市ブレスギア)	Kaoru Yabana	Chabō Higurashi	Kaoru Yabana	October 8, 2025
Arel makes his way to Bresgia, the City of Swords, intent on honing his abilities against other swordsman closer to his level. On the way, the carriage he's riding is attacked by a horde orcs. The two aspiring swordsman aboard with him flee, unwilling to risk their lives for others, and Arel defeats them easily. In Bresgia, Arel struggles to join a guild with his classless status until he stumbles upon his mother's old guild, Dragon Fang. There, he meets Reiner again, and they spar once again. Now that Dragon Fang has three members, he Arel learns the guild is in major debt, but now they are able to compete in the tournament since their guild now has at least three members.
3	"Guild Competition"; Transliteration: "Girudo Taikōsen" (Japanese: ギルド対抗戦)	Jinhui Zhang	Chabō Higurashi	Kaoru Yabana	October 15, 2025
Lilia, Dragon Fang's guildmaster's daughter, wastes no time in entering them into the guild competition scheduled for the following weekend. Arel and Reiner spar to help Arel learns her Guts skill, and Lilia returns to inform them that they will be facing Black Blade in the competition, the current top guild in Bresgia. Arel fights first, taking out four of the five opponents in rapid succession and not leaving any opponents for Reiner or Lilia, with his final opponent being a Samurai named Masamune. Arel uses the ultimate skill his mother taught him to win, saving Dragon's Fang from ruin.
4	"Underground Dungeon"; Transliteration: "Chika Danjon" (Japanese: 地下ダンジョン)	Masaki Arai	Toshihisa Kio	Hiroshi Ōyama	October 22, 2025
Arel and Reiner continue to train, and Dragon Fang's drunken guildmaster, Rod, remains pessimistic about the guild's future despite their victory. To help Arel learn more skills, he, Reiner, and Lilia tackle a dungeon to train. Meanwhile, Black Blade's guildmaster, Gerog, plots against them. Arel clocks the setup immediately upon encountering it in the dungeon but plays along anyway just for fun. Teleported down to the lowest level of the dungeon where a Sword God waits. Arel is excited and enjoys their fight before winning, having learned Sword God techniques from his mother. Georg is deservedly furious that his plan failed and an evil sentient sword preys on Georg's grudge.
5	"Sword God Cup"; Transliteration: "Kenjin-hai" (Japanese: 剣神杯)	Jinhui Zhang	Tsukihi Akizuki	Makoto Ogiwara	October 29, 2025
The Sword God Cup begins, with all three members participating in preliminaries. Arel makes it to the final round of preliminaries and his opponent is a Magic Swordsman. He learns new skills from her and wonders if he can also learn magic. A few days later, the main competition begins. In the first round, Arel faces off against Georg and his cursed sword, which turns out to be a sword possessed by a demon, Deurgelda, and has taken over Georg. On the verge of defeat, Deurgelda leaves Georg and possessed Rod in an attempt to flee and bide him time. Rod, however, has once again found purpose and resists, allowing Arel to destroy the sword.
6	"Arel Returns Home"; Transliteration: "Areru no Kisei" (Japanese: アレルの帰省)	Katsumi Minoguchi	Toshihisa Kio	Masayoshi Nishida	November 5, 2025
Arel has resigned from Dragon's Fang since it's recruited many new members after he won the Sword God Cup, with Rod turning over a new leaf. Arel first wants to test his improvements with his mother, Farah, then discovers Reiner at his house when they finish. Having finally bested his mother, he asks his father to teach him magic. Arel discovers he doesn't have much mana, but he can increase his pool with training. After 6 months, he increases his total mana to that of a Spellcaster class, but learns because he doesn't have any specific magic skill, he must learn magiscript and chant spells in his head to cast. To learn the basics, he decides to attend the magic academy in the City of Magic.
7	"Arsbell, The City of Magic"; Transliteration: "Mahō Toshi Arusuberu" (Japanese: 魔法都市アルスベル)	Kaoru Yabana	Chabō Higurashi	Kaoru Yabana	November 12, 2025
Three years have passed, and in that time Arel has trained enough that he can now attend the academy and leaves on his own. On the way there, he once again saves the carriage and its occupants—the same carriage driver who took him to the City of Swords, and three Spellcasters, Kaito, Colette, and Kufa—from a monster attack, this time with a high level fire spell. Kaito takes a shine to Arel as a fellow Red Mage. At the academy, he learns that the entrance exams are divided by element, and Kaito takes him to the Red Magic entrance exam, where he impresses when he succeeds in melting a mithril target. After, he goes on to take the other schools' entrance exams, as well.
8	"Magic School"; Transliteration: "Mahō Gakuin" (Japanese: 魔法学院)	Tsutomu Murakami	Tsukihi Akizuki	Makoto Ogiwara	November 19, 2025
Although Arel was accepted into all six schools, there remains the issue of scheduling conflicts with his classes. In order to keep up, Kaito, Colette, and Kufa agree to let him borrow their notes so he can learn all he can. Most classes aren't yet teaching him anything he doesn't already know, but the Green Magic school introduces the Flight spell. He struggles with it but is determined when he learns about a Flight race happening in two months. He impresses his Red Magic teacher enough that he offers a promotion exam to skip a grade. He passes and people and hopes he can do the same for every school.
9	"Flight Race"; Transliteration: "Hikō Rēsu" (Japanese: 飛行レース)	Katsumi Minoguchi	Chabō Higurashi	Masaki Arai	November 26, 2025
With some difficulty, Arel manages to convince the Blue Magic school teacher, Instructor Hengel, to give him the promotion exam, but to her chagrin. After succeeding, he moves to the Gren Magic school but learns this school's rules are different and he must get the Green school's headmaster's permission. In order to talk to the very busy headmaster, Colette remembers it's possible if he wins the Flight race. With some clever tricks using Green magic and a Skyswordsman skill, Soar, Arel wins.
10	"The Demon's Contract"; Transliteration: "Akuma no Keiyaku" (Japanese: 悪魔の契約)	Katsumi Minoguchi	Tsukihi Akizuki	Masayoshi Nishida	December 3, 2025
Arel continues with his plans to skip a grade and runs into more obstacles. Having missed a deadline to attend an assembly that will allow him to skip a grade in the Yellow school, he becomes Instructor Rogwell's research assistant. Rogwell is infamous, however, for entering a golem into the assembly every year and defeating students' golems, and joins Rogwell's golem lab after. For the White magic promotion, passing comically fast. The Black magic school has no promotion exam, but Arel accidentally frees a demon, Mastema, from a book while practicing advanced spells then makes him his familiar. Six months later, the Black magic school's tentative budget for the next year is reduced to just 10% unless they win the Six Institutes' Magic Contest.
11	"Classless Hero"; Transliteration: "Mushoku no Eiyū" (Japanese: 無職の英雄)	Tsutomu Murakami	Toshihisa Kio	Makoto Ogiwara	December 10, 2025
The headmaster of the Black magic school summons a demon slime monster, Gluttony, and immediately loses control of it. Later, the headmasters of each school, minus the Black magic school, meet up with the freshman candidates they've chosen to represent their schools in the contest—all of whom turn out to just be Arel. Before the conversation can continue, Gluttony attacks the academy. The headmasters take on Gluttony to protect the students, but it absorbs magic and grows stronger from their powerful attacks. Arel takes over, using all his accumulated skills to defeat it, with all the students and headmasters lending him their mana. He makes the now very weak Gluttony his familiar, naming it Puru, and intends to leave the academy, having learned everything he could there, and plans to go to the City of Monsters to learn how to handle Puru after a quick visit home.
12	"The Empress' Empire"; Transliteration: "Jokō no Kōkoku" (Japanese: 女皇の皇国)	Kaoru Yabana	Chabō Higurashi	Kaoru Yabana	December 17, 2025
On his way home, Arel encounters multiple obstacles instigated by his annoying and overbearing older sister. Having started her own country so he can be classless without facing prejudice, she attempts to bring Arel there against his will. Ultimately, Arel rejects all her advances and offers but appreciates her efforts on his behalf. When he finally returns home, Mastema is surprised his family is so normal. Shortly after returning, he leaves again only leaving a note to his next adventure.
