= I Parry Everything =

Japanese light novel series

- I Parry Everything: What Do You Mean I'm the Strongest? I'm Not Even an Adventurer Yet!
- First light novel volume cover

俺は全てを【パリイ】する ～逆勘違いの世界最強は冒険者になりたい～ (Ore wa Subete o "Parry" Suru: Gyaku Kanchigai no Sekai Saikyō wa Bōken-sha ni Naritai)
- Genre: Adventure, fantasy
- Novel series
- Written by: Nabeshiki
- Published by: Shōsetsuka ni Narō
- Original run: October 17, 2019 – present
- Light novel
- Written by: Nabeshiki
- Illustrated by: Kawaguchi
- Published by: Earth Star Entertainment
- English publisher: NA: J-Novel Club
- Imprint: Earth Star Novel
- Original run: September 15, 2020 – present
- Volumes: 12
- Manga
- Written by: Nabeshiki
- Illustrated by: KRSG
- Published by: Earth Star Entertainment
- English publisher: NA: J-Novel Club
- Imprint: Earth Star Comics
- Magazine: Comic Earth Star
- Original run: September 30, 2020 – present
- Volumes: 5
- Anime television series
- Directed by: Dai Fukuyama
- Written by: Shigeru Murakoshi
- Music by: Tatsuhiko Saiki
- Studio: OLM, Inc.
- Licensed by: Sentai Filmworks: SA/SEA: Muse Communication
- Original network: Tokyo MX, MBS, BS11, AT-X
- Original run: July 5, 2024 – present
- Episodes: 12

I Parry Everything: What Do You Mean I'm the Strongest? I'm Not Even an Adventurer Yet! (Japanese: 俺は全てを【パリイ】する ～逆勘違いの世界最強は冒険者になりたい～, Hepburn: Ore wa Subete o "Parry" Suru: Gyaku Kanchigai no Sekai Saikyō wa Bōken-sha ni Naritai) is a Japanese light novel series written by Nabeshiki with illustrations by Kawaguchi. It began serialization as a web novel published on the user-generated novel publishing website Shōsetsuka ni Narō in October 2019. It was later acquired by Earth Star Entertainment who began to publish it under their Earth Star Novel imprint in September 2020. A manga adaptation illustrated by KRSG began serialization on Earth Star Entertainment's Comic Earth Star online magazine in September 2020. An anime television series adaptation produced by OLM aired from July to September 2024. A second season has been announced.

== Plot ==
The story is set in a fantasy world on the brink of large-scale conflict, following an attempted assassination of Princess Lynneburg of the Kingdom of Clays. While political tensions rise and neighboring nations prepare for war, Noor, an earnest but oblivious young man, arrives in the royal capital determined to fulfill his childhood dream of becoming an adventurer. Having spent more than a decade training alone in the mountains, Noor believes himself unqualified because the only skill he possesses is parrying, which is regarded as useless by most.

Unbeknownst to him, Noor's relentless effort has elevated his single skill to an absurd level, allowing him to effortlessly deflect thousands of attacks in an instant. As he pursues adventuring work and repeatedly fails to understand why others react to him with shock or fear, Noor inadvertently becomes entangled in major incidents tied to the kingdom's survival.

== Characters ==
Noor (ノール, Nōru)
Voiced by: Daiki Hamano (Japanese); Sean Patrick Judge, Brittney Karbowski (child), Nathan Wilson (young) (English)
A fledgling F-rank adventurer, doing odd jobs for the town. He lacks any talent in all of the six Schools of Adventurer Classes, only receiving the most basic of skills in all of them even after training for three months in each class, such as the swordsman skill, [Parry], which as its namesake, can only parry attacks and little more. However, due to training all of these skills for 14 years non-stop for aspirations of unlocking new skills, he has unknowingly evolved all of his existing skills to the point that they became inhumanely strong, even far surpassing his former masters.
Due to living in isolation at the mountains for 14 years, Noor is lacking in social cues and much of what is regarded as generally known information, which keeps causing misunderstandings about him by a lot of people, especially Lynne. As he never understood that his basic skills have become superhuman oddities (due to an acute inferiority complex he developed during his childhood as a result of being rejected by all of his former masters), he kept mistaking high level threats he fights for as "basic starter enemies" which leaves him constantly doubting his own skills and humbling himself despite his inhuman feats.
After saving Lynne's life, he was rewarded by King Clays with the Black Blade, a mysterious blade found by the king during his adventuring days that was said to be virtually unbreakable, which became his signature weapon. He sometimes comically used it to assist him in his odd jobs (such as using it as a shovel to dig out gutters).
Lynne (リーン, Rīn)
Voiced by: Ryōko Maekawa (Japanese); Annie Wild (English)
The princess of the Kingdom of Clays. She was saved by Noor during her coming-of-age trial, where he defeated a minotaur—a catastrophic level threat—with only his [Parry] skill. She then finds and follows Noor around, later declaring herself as his Page (a term for an apprentice for an adventurer), who reluctantly accepts.
Due to her royal upbringing, she is lacking in social cues and much of what is regarded as generally known information, just as much as Noor, causing a chain of misunderstandings between them, with Lynne thinking that Noor's genuine insecurities are signs of humility and confidence.
Despite her airheaded nature, she actually excels in all six classes of adventurers, even claiming that she received top marks in all of them during training.
Ines (イネス, Inesu)
Voiced by: Nanako Mori (Japanese); Elissa Cuellar (English)
The vice-captain of the Warrior Corps, and Lynne's personal bodyguard. She is a prodigy known as the "Divine Shield", who was an orphan until Dundarg took her in as his foster daughter. Due to Dundarg's habit of off-handedly mentioning Noor during her training, Ines developed a sense of jealousy towards him, which amplified when they finally met. However, all that enmity vanishes after she witnessed Noor standing up and defeating a dangerous Poison Dragon that attacked her and Lynne. Now understanding why her foster father speaks highly of him, she now considers him as a comrade and a friend.
King Clays (クレイス王, Kureisu Ō)
Voiced by: Jin Yamanoi (Japanese); Luis Galindo (English)
The king of the Kingdom of Clays, and father to Rein and Lynne. He used to be an adventurer himself, and is the previous owner of the Black Blade, before giving it to Noor as a reward for saving his daughter, although the real reason he gave it to him is because he saw him as an important asset and a potential deterrent in an upcoming war with a neighboring kingdom.
Rein (レイン)
Voiced by: Junta Terashima (Japanese); Houston Hayes (English)
The firstborn to the Kingdom of Clays, heir to the throne, and Lynne's older brother. He has a sharp mind and a loyal devotion to his kingdom.
Sig (シグ, Shigu)
Voiced by: Shin-ichiro Miki (Japanese); Jack Stansbury (English)
One of the Six Sovereigns of the Kingdom of Clays, and the instructor of the School of the Swordsmen. Under his tutelage, Noor learned "Parry".
Dundarg (ダンダルグ, Dandarugu)
Voiced by: Kenta Miyake (Japanese); John Gremillion (English)
One of the Six Sovereigns of the Kingdom of Clays, and the instructor of the School of the Warrior. Under his tutelage, Noor learned "Physical Enhancement".
Mianne (ミアンヌ, Mian'nu)
Voiced by: Megumi Toyoguchi (Japanese); Natalie Rial (English)
One of the Six Sovereigns of the Kingdom of Clays, and the instructor of the School of the Ranger. Noor did not learn anything under her tutelage, as he had already learned "Throw Rock" in order to hunt for food in the forests.
Caroux (カルー, Karū)
Voiced by: Toshihiko Seki (Japanese); Adam Noble (English)
One of the Six Sovereigns of the Kingdom of Clays, and the instructor of the School of the Thief. He is also the head of Clay Kingdom's military intelligence division.
Oaken (オーケン, Ōken)
Voiced by: Hidenari Ugaki (Japanese); John Swasey (English)
One of the Six Sovereigns of the Kingdom of Clays, and the instructor of the School of the Mage. Under his tutelage, Noor learned "Tiny Flame".
Sein (セイン)
Voiced by: Wataru Hatano (Japanese); Blake Weir (English)
One of the Six Sovereigns of the Kingdom of Clays, and the instructor of the School of the Priest. Under his tutelage, Noor learned "Low Heal".
Rolo (ロロ, Roro)
Voiced by: Ayumu Murase
A young demonfolk slave with the ability to control monsters as long as he can keep his focus.
A running gag in the series is that Rolo is the one who actually understands all of the misunderstanding that's been happening, but unable to voice it either due to his shyness or poor timing.
Gilbert (ギルバート, Girubāto)
Voiced by: Shunsuke Takeuchi (Japanese); Joe Daniels (English)
The captain of the Spearman Corps. He is so powerful that he has said to be capable of singlehandedly defeat a dragon. He has beaten every person in the kingdom in mock battle except his master Sig and Ines (who he refused to fight due to her unwillingness to wield a weapon), causing immense burnout and frustration in him due to a lack of a worthy opponent. After being beaten and inadvertently humiliated by Noor, he has developed a one-sided rivalry with him, while also reigniting his spirit.
A running gag in the series is Noor's inability to remember Gilbert's name, much to his chagrin.

== Media ==
=== Light novel ===
Written by Nabeshiki, I Parry Everything: What Do You Mean I'm the Strongest? I'm Not Even an Adventurer Yet! began serialization on the user-generated novel publishing website Shōsetsuka ni Narō on October 17, 2019. It was later acquired by Earth Star Entertainment who began publishing it with illustrations by Kawaguchi under their Earth Star Novel light novel imprint on September 15, 2020. Twelve volumes have been released as of June 14, 2026.

During their Anime NYC 2022 panel, J-Novel Club announced that they licensed the light novels.

No.	Original release date	Original ISBN	North American release date	North American ISBN
1	September 15, 2020	978-4-8030-1452-5	February 28, 2023	978-1-7183-1128-2
1. "The Talentless Boy"; 2. "The Adventurer's Guild"; 3. "My Long-Awaited Adventurer Life"; 4. "I Parry a Cow"; 5. "The Assassination of the Princess"; 6. "Reporting My Completed Commissions"; 7. "The Central Plaza"; 8. "Lynne's House"; 9. "The Audience Chamber and the Black Blade"; 10. "Ines, the Divine Shield"; 11. "Gilbert, the Spear Sovereign"; 12. "The Princess' Request"; 13. "'The Talentless Boy'"; 14. "The Prince's Melancholy"; 15. "My First Goblin Hunt"; 16. "The Forest of Beasts"; 17. "The Goblin Emperor"; 18. "I Parry a Goblin"; 19. "Disturbing Development"; 20. "Reporting the Hunt"; 21. "Coach Ride to the Mountain City"; 22. "The Black Death Dragon"; 23. "The Cursed Child"; 24. "I Parry a Toad"; 25. "The Demonfolk Boy"; 26. "The Princess' Duty"; 27. "The Black-Bandaged Man"; 28. "Deadman Zudu"; 29. "Blades of Silver"; 30. "To the Royal Capital"; Extra: "Princess Lynneburg's First Goblin Hunt ~Five Years Old~"
2	March 15, 2021	978-4-8030-1502-7	May 30, 2023	978-1-7183-1130-5
31. "The Advent of Ruin"; 32. "The Road Home to the Capital"; 33. "The King's Final Moments"; 34. "I Parry a Dragon"; 35. "Battle on the Streets of the Capital"; 36. "A Conversation with the Dragon"; 37. "The Magic Empire's Advance"; 38. "A Tide of Silver"; 39. "The Emperor's Steed"; 40. "My Training School Instructors"; 41. "Dragon in Pursuit"; 42. "Shield of Light"; 43. "Flames of Magic"; 44. "The Throne Room"; 45. "Return to the Royal Capital, Part 1"; 46. "Return to the Royal Capital, Part 2"; 47. "In the King's Makeshift Office"; 48. "A Tasty Meal"; The Talentless Boy; Extra: "Noor and the Black Blade"
3	August 18, 2021	978-4-8030-1551-5	September 11, 2023	978-1-7183-1132-9
4	February 16, 2022	978-4-8030-1615-4	December 18, 2023	978-1-7183-1134-3
5	June 15, 2022	978-4-8030-1654-3	March 25, 2024	978-1-7183-1136-7
6	June 15, 2023	978-4-8030-1800-4	August 9, 2024	978-1-7183-1138-1
7	November 15, 2023	978-4-8030-1865-3	November 30, 2024	978-1-7183-1140-4
8	May 15, 2024	978-4-8030-1948-3	March 17, 2025	978-1-7183-1142-8
9	November 15, 2024	978-4-8030-2033-5	July 19, 2025	978-1-7183-1144-2
10	May 15, 2025	978-4-8030-2125-7	June 1, 2026	978-1-7183-1146-6
11	November 14, 2025	978-4-8030-2219-3	—	—
12	June 14, 2026	978-4-8030-2313-8	—	—

=== Manga ===
A manga adaptation illustrated by KRSG began serialization on Earth Star Entertainment's Comic Earth Star online manga magazine on September 30, 2020. Its chapters have been compiled into five tankōbon volumes as of July 2025.

In January 2023, J-Novel Club announced that they also licensed the manga adaptation.

No.	Original release date	Original ISBN	North American release date	North American ISBN
1	March 12, 2021	978-4-8030-1494-5	March 29, 2023	978-1-7183-2049-9
2	November 12, 2021	978-4-8030-1574-4	June 14, 2023	978-1-7183-2050-5
3	November 10, 2023	978-4-8030-1861-5	January 8, 2025	978-1-7183-2051-2
4	July 12, 2024	978-4-8030-1975-9	January 14, 2026	978-1-7183-2052-9
5	July 11, 2025	978-4-8030-2148-6	July 29, 2026	978-1-7183-2053-6

=== Anime ===
An anime television series adaptation was announced on November 2, 2023. It is produced by OLM and directed by Dai Fukuyama, with Shigeru Murakoshi in charge of series scripts, Chikako Noma designing the characters, and Tatsuhiko Saiki composing the music. The series aired from July 5 to September 20, 2024, on Tokyo MX and other networks. (Note: Tokyo MX and BS11 lists the series premiere on July 4, 2024, at 24:00, which is effectively July 5 at midnight JST.) Both the opening theme song, "Ambition", and the ending theme song, "No Gifted", are performed by members of the music group Utahime Dream. Sentai Filmworks streamed the series on Hidive in North America, Australia and British Isles as part of a distribution partnership between it and Mainichi Broadcasting, and is one of the titles that was released through the partnership. Muse Communication has also licensed the series for the Asia-Pacific region.

A second season was announced during the "Earth Star Novel 10th Anniversary Summer Festival" event on July 19, 2025.

==== Episodes ====
No.	Title	Directed by	Written by	Storyboarded by	Original release date
1	"I Parry a Cow"; Transliteration: "Ore wa Ushi o Parī Suru" (Japanese: 俺は牛をパリイする)	So Toyama	Shigeru Murakoshi	Dai Fukuyama	July 5, 2024
Following the death of his mother young Noor decides to become an adventurer. At the royal capital the Guild Master informs him he must attend training school first. After several months Noor fails every class as he cannot learn basic skills except a basic skill to parry opponent's attacks with a sword, but this is not enough for the Guild Master to hire him. Noor returns home and decides to master parrying. After ten years Noor, now a young man, can parry 1000 swords a second and returns to the guild. Taking pity on him the Master hires him as a lowly F Rank; he is not allowed to go on real quests but can earn money doing manual labour around the city. One day while working near a cave he hears a cry for help inside and finds noble Lady Lynne and her guards being attacked by a Minotaur. With most of the guards dead Noor defends her using only his parry skill. Eventually his sword breaks but his last desperate parry not only disarms the Minotaur; it is beheaded with its own axe. Lynne attempts to thank him, but he leaves without revealing his name, embarrassed at how difficult the fight was and determined to train even harder.
2	"I Parry Rewards"; Transliteration: "Ore wa Sharei o Parī Suru" (Japanese: 俺は謝礼をパリイする)	Oh Jin-Koo	Shigeru Murakoshi	Oh Jin-Koo	July 12, 2024
Lynne's brother Lord Rein discovers the Minotaur was magically summoned to assassinate Lynne by King Deridas of the Magic Empire of Deridas to provoke war, after which Deridas could claim the kingdoms Labyrinth of the Lost. Despite hearing rumours of a mystery warrior who defeated a Minotaur Noor doesn't realise it refers to himself as he is under the impression he only killed a magically mutated cow. Lynne even tracks him down to reward him but due to his misunderstanding he refuses to accept any reward and instead grudgingly agrees to meet her father. Upon arriving at her home Noor learns Lynne is actually Lady Lynneburg Clays but doesn't realise her father is the King, even after meeting him in the throne room. Unwilling to let him leave without a reward the King gives Noor his own sword from his adventuring days, a massive two-handed great sword Noor plans only to use as a shovel to clear the city drains easier. Lynnes bodyguard Ines warns him next time he meets the King not to be so casual, with Noor somehow still not realising he just met the King. Before he can leave, he is confronted by another bodyguard, the spearman Gilbert who is interested in his abilities.
3	"I Parry Taking on a Page"; Transliteration: "Ore wa deshiiri o Parī Suru" (Japanese: 俺は弟子入りをパリイする)	Yoshikazu Ueki	Shingo Irie	Wataru Nakagawa	July 19, 2024
Gilbert insists on a mock duel. Noor naturally dodges or parries all of Gilbert's strikes and assumes Gilbert is going easy on him. Gilbert is shocked when Noor suddenly declares Gilbert won as Noor has already convinced himself he will lose. Gilbert feels great humiliation at being handed victory when he so obviously lost. He also cannot understand Noor's technique as Noor moved so fast that his feet cracked the stone floor. Noor is saddened he is so weak that Gilbert had to go easy on him and returns to work where he finds the King's sword really is perfect for clearing sewers. Lynne seeks him out and asks to be his Page. Noor refuses, thinking he doesn't have anything he could teach her and demonstrates the few Level 1 magic skills he possesses despite spending years at the adventurer training school. Lynne suddenly realises Noor is the infamous Talentless, the boy who completed every training course the school offered with only Level 1 skills. What is unknown to Noor is that he has refined his level 1 skills so much they have surpassed what even Professor Oken the Royal Magician is capable of. Desiring such strength for when she one day becomes Queen Lynne refuses to accept Noor's rejection and swears she will follow him everywhere he goes until she deduces the source of his strength.
4	"I Parry a Goblin"; Transliteration: "Ore wa Goburin o Parī Suru" (Japanese: 俺はゴブリンをパリイする)	Yasuo Ejima	Shigeru Murakoshi	Itsuro Kawasaki	July 26, 2024
Rein cannot believe the King gave Noor the Black Blade, a sword looted from the deepest explored level of the dungeon and immune to both physical and magical damage, despite already being heavily damaged. His only conclusion is the King wants Noor to do something important. Noor goes to get another labouring job but with B-rank Lynne as his partner they are instead sent to hunt goblins outside the city, exciting Noor, though he regrets he had to take advantage of Lynne's rank. In the forest they discover an extremely rare Goblin Emperor. Noor, having never seen a goblin before, assumes it is a normal goblin and throws himself into the fight to prove he is as strong as other adventurers. Lynne mistakes his enthusiasm for foreknowledge of the Emperor's existence and a desire to kill it in secret to stop other adventurers being killed. Working together Noor knocks loose the mana-stone in the Emperor's forehead allowing Lynne to kill it with fire. Noor mistakenly concludes he is not yet strong enough if he can't defeat a goblin by himself. Rein suspects the Emperor was another assassination plot by the Deridas Empire. Noor returns to the guild and reports he only killed one goblin, only to discover since they burned the body and didn't bring any evidence of the killing, they won't even be paid for completing the job.
5	"I Parry a Frog"; Transliteration: "Ore wa Kaeru o Parī Suru" (Japanese: 俺はカエルをパリイする)	Mayu Tanimoto	Shingo Irie	Takashi Kawabata	August 2, 2024
Based on evidence Rein starts preparing the country for invasion by the Deridas Empire. This includes sending Noor, Ines and Lynne to scout the Toros Mountains, though this is just a subterfuge that would allow Lynne to escape to the friendly nation of the Mithra Theocracy. Ines recalls discovering her power of Holy Shield as a child and being trained to use it by her foster father Sir Dandalg. Several times she heard him praising a man he knew called Noor and became jealous of that praise. Despite her attempt to rise above it her jealousy has only increased since meeting Noor herself. Monsters begin attacking the city while in the mountains Noor encounters a Black Death Dragon being controlled by a young Demonfolk boy. Ines considers the boy an enemy as Demonfolk have been enemies of humans for generations. Noor rushes in to protect the boy when the dragon gets free, assuming from its weakness it is merely an overgrown frog, but he is quickly affected by the dragons deadly poison. Ines restrains Lynne from trying to help but seeing Noor fight on, even on the edge of death, makes her realise why Dandalg admired him and that instead of being jealous she should strive to become a warrior like Noor.
6	"I Parry Deadly Poison"; Transliteration: "Ore wa Mōdoku o Parī Suru" (Japanese: 俺は猛毒をパリイする)	Kentaro Fujita	Shigeru Murakoshi	Kentaro Fujita	August 9, 2024
The boy, who has been abused all his life just for being born a Demonfolk, was offered freedom if he used his abilities to attack the Kingdom. Having lost control of the dragon he cannot understand why Noor is protecting him. Despite being poisoned himself Noor uses healing magic on the boy. It is shown via flashback that Noor accidentally poisoned himself as a boy and then did it repeatedly as he realised he gained a tolerance to poisons. With the poison neutralized he traps the dragons mouth shut with his next parry and the pressure of the trapped poison gas causes the dragon to explode. The boy tries to admit bringing the dragon there for war but Noor, with his habit of eating poisonous animals, assumes the boy was taking the "frog" to the Kingdom to sell as meat and is impressed by his Demonfolk abilities which he is certain would be of great value to the Kingdom. Lynne doesn't trust the boy until Ines points out the clear evidence he was raised a slave to be used as a child soldier. Lynne insists on taking the boy, Rolo, with them even though Demonfolk are forbidden from entering the Mithra Theocracy. At that moment a strange man appears.
7	"I Parry the Deadman"; Transliteration: "Ore wa Shibito o Parī Suru" (Japanese: 俺は死人をパリイする)	Tsubasa Obari	Shingo Irie	Haru Tsuchiya & Kentaro Fujita	August 16, 2024
The stranger intends to return Rolo's corpse to his owners. Noor barely parries his attacks to protect Rolo. Ines identifies the stranger as Deadman Zadu, an S Rank adventurer who used his abilities for both quests and heinous crimes, including the destruction of an entire country by killing all its soldiers and then murdering the royal family. Due to his abilities and wealth no one can bring him to justice so most governments simply declared him dead then left him alone. Against Noor's sword Zadu breaks all his daggers, even ones made of Mythril and dragon teeth, so he draws his ultimate weapon, Silver Cross. Using Dwarven alchemy Silver Cross can split into hundreds of knives to attack all at once. Ines assists with her Holy Shield, allowing Noor to destroy Silver Cross by throwing teeth from the Death Dragon to shatter it. With no weapons left Zadu departs but taunts them that something big is happening in the royal capital. Rolo confirms another Demonfolk is taking an even stronger monster to destroy the capital. They immediately rush to return there with Lynne confident Noor can save them. At the capital Rein witnesses the arrival of the monster, a titanic Dragon of Calamity.
8	"I Parry a Dragon"; Transliteration: "Ore wa Ryu o Parī Suru" (Japanese: 俺は竜をパリイする)	Wazuka Komamiya	Subaru Yoneyama	Wazuka Komamiya	August 23, 2024
Rein tries to start an evacuation but someone uses magic to block the roads and the Sovereign Six, a group of strongest adventurers, have all been lured away beforehand on other jobs. Even with everyone else terrified Noor is somehow confident the dragon is no stronger than the Goblin Emperor and should be easily defeated. Lynne's father can't believe King Deridas would go this far just to take control of their dungeon. To save his people he approaches the dragon himself hoping to at least blind it before his death. Ines and Lynne combine their magic for a spell to get Noor back to the city faster than a bullet. As he cannot control his speed or trajectory Noor ends up hitting the dragon right in the head. Despite its colossal size Noor is still capable of parrying its attacks, damaging its claws and scales with ease. Rolo uses his powers to help Ines and Lynne defeat goblins. Rolo senses the dragon, being deeply prideful, is frustrated Noor isn't treating it like a threat. With his next parry Noor snaps one of its fangs, causing it to fall over. Rolo is amazed to sense the dragon actually submitting to Noor, having lost its will to fight.
9	"I Parry an Army"; Transliteration: "Ore wa Gunzei o Parī Suru" (Japanese: 俺は軍勢をパリイする)	So Toyama	Shigeru Murakoshi	Itsuro Kawasaki	August 30, 2024
Noor is convinced the dragon only stopped because Rolo told it to. With Rolo translating the dragon claims Noor is now its master, but Noor assumes it is referring to Rolo and merely tells the dragon to go home. As it flies away it is shot down by a mana cannon from King Deridas whose army is now in position to finish taking the city. Deridas fires the cannon again to get rid of Lynne and especially the troublesome Ines and her Holy Shield. Amazingly, Noor parries the blast harmlessly into the sky. Using the same high speed spell as before Lynne fires Noor at the army where he parries thousands of swords into the air, unintentionally defeating half the army when the swords fall back to earth, injuring the soldiers they land on. Deridas is terrified to see Noor wielding the Black Blade, the whole reason he wanted the dungeon in the first place. As even Lynne's father the Hero King had to use both hands to lift its massive weight Deridas realises Noor, who swings it easily with one hand, might just be the strongest, most dangerous man alive. In front of his entire army Deridas wets himself in fear and flees in disgrace.
10	"I Parry the Emperor's Authority"; Transliteration: "Ore wa Kōtei no I o Parī Suru" (Japanese: 俺は皇帝の威をパリイする)	Wataru Nakagawa	Subaru Yoneyama	Takashi Kawabata	September 6, 2024
Following Deridas' retreat a flashback shows Noor was actually focusing solely on disarming the soldiers. He never realised Deridas was the enemy commander and assumed he was a harmless old man. Therefore, Noor's monstrous face that terrified Deridas was actually Noor trying to do a reassuring smile whilst exhausted. Having pushed himself too hard Noor nearly faints but is rescued by Gilbert and his master Sig, one of the Sovereign Six. It is revealed the Sovereign Six are all instructors at the adventurer training schools, meaning at various times Noor actually received training from all six of them, and they all remember Noor fondly. They regret Deridas escaped but Noor has a sudden idea how to catch him. Reaching the still alive dragon it is healed by Sovereign Sein and agrees to transport everyone in hunting Deridas, including Sovereign Caroux and Rein, though again Noor thinks it is Rolo's power that made the dragon agree. After they depart Sig shares his pride with Sovereign Dandalg that despite failing the training schools as a boy Noor has grown and surpassed the Sovereign Six a long time ago. They catch up to Deridas and pursue him over the border into the empires territory. Despite the danger no one quite notices Noor has passed out from his fear of heights.
11	"I Parry Divine Wrath"; Transliteration: "Ore wa Kami no Ikari o Parī Suru" (Japanese: 俺は神の怒りをパリイする)	Hayato Yamanaka	Shingo Irie	Hayato Yamanaka	September 13, 2024
Deridas makes it to his castle and orders activation of an even larger cannon that automatically targets the dragons mana. Noor parries this too, breaking the shot into chunks that automatically target the Empires mana generators as they fall. Without the generators the city shuts down. Noor, having accidentally fallen off the dragon, lands in Deridas' throne room just as his generals try to assassinate him to end the war. Unable to grasp what is happening Noor parries everything, saving Deridas' life. Fortunately, the others arrive so Noor lets them take over. As soon as Noor leaves Rein blames Deridas for the deaths of 127 citizens during his invasion. With his generals agreement, Rein sentences Deridas to suffer the same 127 deaths by crushing, burning and being torn apart by monsters, albeit without actually dying thanks to Sein's healing magic. Deridas' grandson replaces him as Emperor, but due to his youth he is placed under guardianship of the generals leader, Imperial Sorcerer Randeus, who gratefully declares a new friendship between the Empire and the Kingdom. Returning home the King insists Noor accept a reward so Noor requests Kingdom citizenship for Rolo. Even though this would cause trouble with the Mithra Holy Theocracy, the King agrees and sends Rolo to live with Ines where he finally gets to sleep in a real bed and try delicious food.
12	"I Parry Everything"; Transliteration: "Ore wa Subete o Parī Suru" (Japanese: 俺は全てをパリイする)	Dai Fukuyama	Shigeru Murakoshi	Dai Fukuyama	September 20, 2024
Noor recalls meeting the Sovereign Six when they were his instructors. Sig trained Noor as a swordsman and was amazed by his potential, but was forced to fail Noor as he only learned Parry. Dundarg trained him as a warrior but despite his astounding strength had to fail him when he didn't unlock any warrior skills. Mianne noticed he possessed perfect accuracy and tried to train him as an archer, but he broke every bow he touched. Caroux trained him as a thief and was impressed by his tenacity but failed him for lacking stealth. Oaken trained him in magic and was certain Noor had the skills, but unfortunately his mana levels were too low. Sein refused to train him since he hadn't received the healers blessings, but he eventually agreed. Noor only learned Low Heal, but Sein was impressed Noor managed it without the blessing. By the time the Six discussed Noor's astonishing potential and decided to all train him together he had disappeared. Noor returns to the guild where the guildmaster, having no idea Noor saved the kingdom, puts him to work clearing rubble. The King is certain the Mithra Theocracy was behind Deridas' invasion, meaning another war is coming, but luckily he has Noor to rely on. Noor, having no real idea he just saved the kingdom, can't wait to go on a real adventure someday and become a hero.
