= A Tale of the Secret Saint =

Japanese light novel series

- First light novel volume cover

転生した大聖女は、聖女であることをひた隠す (Tensei Shita Daiseijo wa, Seijo de Aru Koto o Hitakakusu)
- Genre: Fantasy
- Novel series
- Written by: Touya
- Published by: Shōsetsuka ni Narō
- Original run: January 6, 2019 – present
- Light novel
- Written by: Touya
- Illustrated by: chibi
- Published by: Earth Star Entertainment
- English publisher: NA: Seven Seas Entertainment
- Imprint: Earth Star Novel
- Original run: June 15, 2019 – present
- Volumes: 13
- Manga
- Written by: Touya
- Illustrated by: Mahito Aobe
- Published by: Earth Star Entertainment
- English publisher: NA: Seven Seas Entertainment
- Imprint: Earth Star Comics
- Magazine: Comic Earth Star
- Original run: December 19, 2019 – present
- Volumes: 14
- Light novel

A Tale of the Secret Saint Zero
- Written by: Touya
- Illustrated by: chibi
- Published by: Earth Star Entertainment
- English publisher: NA: Seven Seas Entertainment
- Imprint: Earth Star Novel
- Original run: July 15, 2022 – present
- Volumes: 6
- Manga

A Tale of the Secret Saint Zero
- Written by: Touya
- Illustrated by: Shiina
- Published by: Earth Star Entertainment
- Imprint: Earth Star Comics
- Magazine: Comic Earth Star
- Original run: October 19, 2023 – present
- Volumes: 6
- Anime television series
- Directed by: Tomoe Makino; Naoki Murata (assistant)
- Written by: Deko Akao
- Music by: Kenichiro Suehiro
- Studio: Felix Film
- Licensed by: Crunchyroll: SEA: Muse Communication
- Original network: Tokyo MX, BS11, SUN, AT-X, EBC, UX, HTB, NCC
- Original run: October 3, 2026 – present
- Episodes: 2
- icon

A Tale of the Secret Saint (Japanese: 転生した大聖女は、聖女であることをひた隠す, Hepburn: Tensei Shita Daiseijo wa, Seijo de Aru Koto o Hitakakusu) is a Japanese light novel series written by Touya and illustrated by chibi. It initially began serialization on the user-generated novel publishing site Shōsetsuka ni Narō in January 2019, before later being acquired and published by Earth Star Entertainment under their Earth Star novel imprint in June 2019. A manga adaptation illustrated by Mahito Aobe began serialization on Earth Star Entertainment's Comic Earth Star manga website in December 2019. An anime television series adaptation produced by Felix Film premiered in October 2026.

== Plot ==
Fia Ruud, a young girl, uses a healing potion on a black bird in the forest, which turns out to be a dragon that attacks and nearly kills her. As Fia is dying, she remembers that she was the great saint Seraphina 300 years prior in a previous life, which causes her to regain the power of a saint. Using this power, Fia saves herself and enters into a contract with the dragon Zavilia. Fia decides that it is best if she hides her true identity.

== Characters ==
Fia Ruud (フィーア・ルード, Fīa Rūdo)
Voiced by: Shion Wakayama
Zavilia (ザビリア, Zabiria)
Voiced by: Shinnosuke Tokudome
Saviz Nav (サヴィス・ナーヴ, Sabizu Nābu)
Voiced by: Yūichirō Umehara
Cyril Sutherland (シリル・サザランド, Shiriru Sazarando)
Voiced by: Nobunaga Shimazaki
Desmond Ronan (デズモンド・ローナン, Dezumondo Rōnan)
Voiced by: Tasuku Hatanaka
Zachary Townsend (ザカリー・タウンゼント, Zakarī Taunzento)
Voiced by: Daiki Hamano
Quintin Agata (クェンティン・アガター, Kuentin Agatā)
Voiced by: Tomokazu Sugita
Clarissa Abanecy (クラリッサ・アバネシー, Kurarissa Abaneshī)
Voiced by: Yukari Tamura
Enoch (イーノック, Īnokku)
Voiced by: Shun'ichi Toki
Fabian Winer (ファビアン・ワイナー, Fabian Wainā)
Voiced by: Daiki Yamashita
Charlotte (シャーロット, Shārotto)
Voiced by: Miyuri Shimabukuro
Curtis Bannister (カーティス・バニスター, Kātisu Banisutā)
Voiced by: Kikunosuke Toya

== Media ==
=== Light novel ===
Written by Touya, A Tale of the Secret Saint began serialization on the user-generated novel publishing website Shōsetsuka ni Narō on January 6, 2019. It was later acquired and published by Earth Star Entertainment with illustrations by chibi under their Earth Star novel imprint on June 15, 2019, with thirteen volumes released as of September 15, 2026.

In September 2020, Seven Seas Entertainment announced that they licensed the novels for English publication.

A spin-off light novel series, titled A Tale of the Secret Saint Zero, began publication on July 15, 2022, with six volumes released as of October 16, 2025.

In May 2024, Seven Seas Entertainment announced that they also licensed the spin-off series for English publication.

==== Volumes ====
No.	Original release date	Original ISBN	North American release date	North American ISBN
1	June 15, 2019	978-4-8030-1306-1	September 9, 2021 (digital); November 2, 2021 (print)	978-1-64827-646-0
2	November 15, 2019	978-4-8030-1360-3	March 17, 2022 (digital); April 12, 2022 (print)	978-1-64827-647-7
3	May 15, 2020	978-4-8030-1419-8	June 2, 2022 (digital); July 26, 2022 (print)	978-1-63858-181-9
4	December 16, 2020	978-4-8030-1476-1	December 1, 2022 (digital); December 27, 2022 (print)	978-1-63858-336-3
5	May 15, 2021	978-4-8030-1522-5	October 19, 2023 (digital); December 19, 2023 (print)	978-1-63858-761-3
6	December 15, 2021	978-4-8030-1594-2	June 20, 2024 (digital); October 1, 2024 (print)	978-1-68579-642-6
7	August 18, 2022	978-4-8030-1683-3	November 7, 2024 (digital); December 17, 2024 (print)	979-8-88843-676-9
8	February 15, 2023	978-4-8030-1747-2	June 19, 2025 (digital); July 29, 2025 (print)	979-8-89373-021-0
9	October 18, 2023	978-4-8030-1851-6	November 13, 2025 (digital); December 9, 2025 (print)	979-8-89373-460-7
10	June 14, 2024	978-4-8030-1961-2	April 16, 2026 (digital); May 19, 2026 (print)	979-8-89373-595-6
11	March 14, 2025	978-4-8030-2095-3; 978-4-8030-2096-0 (SE)	September 10, 2026 (digital); October 3, 2026 (print)	979-8-89765-108-5
12	January 15, 2026	978-4-8030-2253-7	March 23, 2027 (print)	979-8-89863-894-8
13	September 15, 2026	978-4-8030-2373-2	—	—
SS	October 15, 2026	978-4-8030-2395-4	—	—

==== A Tale of the Secret Saint Zero ====
No.	Original release date	Original ISBN	North American release date	North American ISBN
1	July 15, 2022	978-4-8030-1670-3	November 28, 2024 (digital); December 31, 2024 (print)	979-8-89160-741-5
2	February 15, 2023	978-4-8030-1746-5	April 3, 2025 (digital); May 6, 2025 (print)	979-8-89160-945-7
3	August 18, 2023	978-4-8030-1825-7	September 11, 2025 (digital); October 7, 2025 (print)	979-8-89373-379-2
4	March 15, 2024	978-4-8030-1922-3	February 5, 2026 (digital); March 3, 2026 (print)	979-8-89373-596-3
5	December 18, 2024	978-4-8030-2049-6	July 28, 2026 (print)	979-8-89561-514-0
6	October 16, 2025	978-4-8030-2197-4	December 15, 2026 (print)	979-8-89863-163-5

=== Manga ===
A manga adaptation illustrated by Mahito Aobe began serialization on Earth Star Entertainment's Comic Earth Star manga website on December 19, 2019, with its chapters compiled into fifteen tankōbon volumes as of October 9, 2026.

In September 2020, Seven Seas Entertainment also announced that they licensed the manga adaptation for English publication.

A manga adaptation of the A Tale of the Secret Saint Zero spin-off series illustrated by Shiina began serialization on October 19, 2023, with its chapters compiled into six tankōbon volumes as of October 9, 2026.

==== Volumes ====
No.	Original release date	Original ISBN	North American release date	North American ISBN
1	April 11, 2020	978-4-8030-1408-2	November 30, 2021	978-1-64827-342-1
2	September 12, 2020	978-4-8030-1446-4	February 15, 2022	978-1-63858-104-8
3	February 12, 2021	978-4-8030-1488-4	June 14, 2022	978-1-63858-302-8
4	July 12, 2021	978-4-8030-1536-2	October 3, 2023	978-1-63858-769-9
5	December 10, 2021	978-4-8030-1586-7	February 6, 2024	978-1-68579-457-6
6	May 12, 2022	978-4-8030-1641-3	June 4, 2024	978-1-68579-560-3
7	October 12, 2022	978-4-8030-1700-7	October 8, 2024	979-8-89160-174-1
8	April 12, 2023	978-4-8030-1770-0	February 4, 2025	979-8-89160-864-1
9	October 12, 2023	978-4-8030-1847-9	July 1, 2025	979-8-89373-000-5
10	March 13, 2024	978-4-8030-1921-6	November 25, 2025	979-8-89373-461-4
11	October 11, 2024	978-4-8030-2019-9; 978-4-8030-2023-6 (SE)	May 5, 2026	979-8-89561-201-9
12	March 12, 2025	978-4-8030-2091-5; 978-4-8030-2092-2 (SE)	October 27, 2026	979-8-89765-109-2
13	October 10, 2025	978-4-8030-2196-7	February 16, 2027	979-8-89863-295-3
14	April 10, 2026	978-4-8030-2203-2	—	—
15	October 9, 2026	978-4-8030-2393-0; 978-4-8030-2394-7 (SE)	—	—

==== A Tale of the Secret Saint ZERO ====
No.	Japanese release date	Japanese ISBN
1	March 13, 2024	978-4-8030-1913-1
2	September 12, 2024	978-4-8030-2002-1
3	March 12, 2025	978-4-8030-2085-4
4	October 10, 2025	978-4-8030-2189-9
5	April 10, 2026	978-4-8030-2298-8
6	October 9, 2026	978-4-8030-2298-8

=== Anime ===
An anime television series adaptation was announced on March 6, 2025. It is produced by Felix Film and directed by Tomoe Makino, with Naoki Murata serving as assistant director, Deko Akao handling series composition, Satomi Kurita designing the characters, and Kenichiro Suehiro composing the music. The series was originally scheduled for April 2026, but was later delayed "in order to aim to provide a more enjoyable work for everyone", which eventually premiered on October 3, 2026, on Tokyo MX and other networks. The opening theme song is "Flare of Soul", performed by Kaya, and the ending theme song is "Stellar", performed by Utahime Dream All Stars. Crunchyroll is streaming the series. Muse Communication licensed the series in Southeast Asia.

==== Episodes ====
No.	Title	Directed by	Storyboarded by	Original release date
1	"The Great Saint Awakens"; Transliteration: "Daiseijo no Mezame" (Japanese: 大聖女の目覚め)	Naoki Murata & Kazuto Horikawa	Tomoe Makino	October 3, 2026
Fia, daughter of noble Dolph Ruud, insists on undergoing her family's Rite of Passage despite lacking sword skills. Her knight siblings Oria, Leon and Ardio eventually relent, sending her off with an expensive healing potion. Fia uses a drop of potion on an injured bird, unaware it is actually a baby dragon. The dragon instantly surges in size and bites her in a panic. Near death, Fia recalls her past life as the Great Saint, Princess Seraphina, who was betrayed by her three jealous brothers and tortured to death by the Demon Lord's General after she defeated the Demon Lord. Unconsciously using Seraphina's magic, Fia heals herself. Grateful, the dragon binds itself to her as a familiar, naming itself Zavilia. Before Fia wakes, Zavilia slays nearby monsters, leaving behind a massive A-rank monster core. When Fia returns home with Zavilia, her family accept she has passed the rite. To protect Fia from forced marriage to royalty for the powers of a rare Black Dragon, and refusing to take credit for her achievements for himself, Dolph insists Zavilia is merely "grey-ish" and not worth telling the King about. Fia vows to hide her powers, mindful of the Demon General's threat to kill her again if she ever reincarnated.
2	"Fia and the Knight Brigade"; Transliteration: "Fīa to Kishidan" (Japanese: フィーアと騎士団)	Michita Shiraishi	Hatsuki Tsuji	October 10, 2026 (Note: From Episode 2, episodes are released on ABEMA, Prime Video, Crunchyroll and simulcast platforms by Muse a week before their televised airings.)
Fia decides to take the knight exam. After defeating her brother Leon in a duel and passing the written test, she advances to mock battles. Confident thanks to a secret enchantment she placed on a sword Dolph gave her, she also subtly numbs the pain of another examinee, Fabian, who is fighting with a broken arm. Both Fia and Fabian pass, receiving assignments to the First Brigade protecting the royal family, descendants of the prince brothers who betrayed Fia in her past life as Seraphina. During the entrance ceremony, Knight Grand Master Prince Saviz challenges Fia to an exhibition duel and easily disarms her. Saviz confiscates her sword, recognizing its massive strength-multiplying enchantment as national-treasure level. Dolph unwittingly backs Fia's claim that the blade simply came from their family armoury. When asked why she only targeted Saviz' left side during the duel, Fia admits she was exploiting a hidden injury in his left leg, impressing Saviz with her tactical perception. A week later, Brigade Captains Cyril, Desmond, and Enoch discuss Fia. Recognizing her strange mix of razor-sharp observation and utter obliviousness, alongside her sword Enoch insists could only have been enchanted during the High Golden Age 300 years ago, they eagerly await her upcoming monster hunt with Sixth Brigade.
3	"The Saint's State of Being"; Transliteration: "Seijo no Arikata" (Japanese: 聖女の在り方)	Shō Hamada	Hideki Tonokatsu	October 17, 2026
Fia and Sixth Brigade are joined on the hunt by three of the current Saints, but Fia is deeply disappointed, realising humanity has lost the ability to make spirit contracts, reducing Saints to weak healers who struggle with minor injuries. A Flower-horn Deer attacks and the cowardly Saints flee, forcing Fia to take command until Cyril and Saviz arrive. Afterward, the ungrateful Saints blame the knights for not protecting them sufficiently. To hide her own healing magic, Fia is forced to consume a bitter healing potion, then gather sweet berries to cover up the taste. Because only her handpicked berries are sweet, Saviz suspects forest spirits favour her. During an interrogation by the Captains, Fia throws a tantrum over being treated suspiciously instead of attending the victory feast. During the celebration, Fia is cheered for saving lives. Later, summoned by Cyril, Saviz, and Zackary, an intoxicated Fia tactlessly exposes Cyril as the strongest Captain, prompting Cyril to request secrecy to protect Grand Master Saviz's reputation. Saviz lends Fia to the Fourth Brigade Monster Hunters. He also asks her opinion of the Saints. Still drunk, Fia openly rants that such arrogant, cowardly women, who would abandon their knights in battle, should be ashamed to call themselves Saints, and the Saints of the past would be disgusted by them.
4	"The Fourth Monster Tamer Knight Brigade"; Transliteration: "Dai-Yon Mamono Kishi-dan" (Japanese: 第四魔物騎士団)	Michita Shiraishi	Kōji Yoshikawa & Hikari Takeuchi	October 24, 2026
Fia is tasked with evaluating the Fourth Brigade’s familiars. Noticing her tiny familiar mark, Cyril assumes Fia's familiar is weak. In reality, the mark is small because Zavilia volunteered and did not resist the contract. Although Vice-Captain Gideon initially dismisses Fia to protect Fourth Brigade's reputation, his assistant Patty assures her he will come around once he stops acting childishly. Upon learning familiars require regular care, a worried Fia visits the forest and finds Zavilia has grown larger. So he can come with her, Zavilia shrinks to cat-size, and Fia disguises him as a Blue Dove. Gideon eventually assigns Fia to administer health potions to injured familiars. He grows suspicious of Zavilia, noting he is an extremely odd-looking Blue Dove, and becomes enraged when Zavilia insults him, though Fia insists he is hearing things as everyone knows Blue Doves cannot speak. News arrives a black dragon was spotted nearby. Fia observes the new Saints struggle to brew potions that are colourless, bitter, and painful to swallow, causing familiars to resist them, unlike the superior emerald-green potions Fia remembers making. Fortunately, Zavilia uses minor Intimidation to make the familiars behave. A young Saint joins them in the stables.
5	"Calamitous Monsters"; Transliteration: "Tensai-kyū no Mamono" (Japanese: 天災級の魔物)	TBA	TBA	October 31, 2026
Saint Charlotte is baffled by how easily Fia got the familiars to take her potions. She admits the Church forbade her from contacting her mother until she grew stronger, yet she still struggles with potion brewing. Despite having orange hair, a trait usually signalling moderate saint power, she feels inadequate. Fia offers to help Charlotte practice healing magic, surreptitiously injecting her own power into the spell and converting an entire forest spring into a green healing potion. Charlotte assumes she failed because the potion is not colourless, yet is thrilled the familiars heal overnight. Gideon accuses Fia of showing off. Cyril interrupts, scolding Gideon for hindering Fia's efforts. Captain Quentin arrives and, being sensitive to magical energy, is stunned by Fia's calamitous power output and her Blue Dove's black dragon aura. Normally arrogant, Quentin shockingly grovels before Fia and Zavilia, beating up Gideon for his disrespect. Fia takes the opportunity to slip away. Charlotte notices Princess Seraphina’s portrait shares Fia’s red hair and golden eyes, suspecting Fia is a Saint but promising to keep her secret. Quentin notices Fia’s tiny but flawless familiar mark contrasts sharply with his own jagged mark covering his entire arm, and asks to speak to Zavilia directly. Fia worries he knows Zavilia is the black dragon.
6	"A Plan to Capture the Black King"; Transliteration: "Kokuō Hokaku Sakusen" (Japanese: 黒王捕獲作戦)	TBA	TBA	November 7, 2026
Quentin questions Zavilia regarding his contract with Fia. Zavilia explains he shares life force and magic with her; as long as he lives, Fia cannot die or deplete her magic. In return, he experiences her thoughts and emotions. Cyril escorts Quentin to the Captains Meeting, with Fia attending at Quentin's request. Saviz remarks that captains act foolishly around Fia, so she stands near female captain Clarissa of the Fifth Brigade, unaware Clarissa is the "Pink Praying Mantis," a notorious seducer of young knights. The meeting reveals the Black Dragon has been seen matured into an adult already. As it now cannot be captured or defeated, the captains decide to send items from its former mountain cave, hoping familiar scents will lure the dragon back to its home away from humans. Fia realizes Quentin intends for Zavilia to play along with the plan. A jealous Zavilia requests permission to assassinate Quentin, Gideon, and Cyril, which Fia strictly forbids. The next morning, Fia secretly heals Quentin’s injured griffon and other familiars, causing them to swarm her with affection, which baffles Quentin. A remorseful Gideon offers to resign as vice-captain. Zackary announces that Fia will travel with the Saints. During the journey, a Dream Bird attacks, inflicting magical hallucinations on the group, leaving Fia uncertain what to do.
7	"Zavilia"; Transliteration: "Zabiria" (Japanese: ザビリア)	TBA	TBA	November 14, 2026
When soldiers are injured, their familiars instinctually look to Fia for instructions. She directs them to surround and reveal the invisible Bird, allowing Zackary to slay it. More monsters arrive, including a mated pair of blue dragons seeking food before reproducing, so they grab Quentin's griffon. Fia realises the cowardly Saints fled from battle again. Zavilia reveals he was a blue dragon in his past life. In that life, his twin brother bit off his wing, causing their mother to abandon him. After struggling to survive, Zavilia became strong and joined a blue dragon tribe. When Fenrirs mortally wounded the chief, he passed his power and the name "Zavilia" to him, regrowing his wing. As chief, Zavilia protected the tribe, finding and forgiving his brother. However, his jealous brother turned the tribe against him, forcing Zavilia to flee to Blackpeak Mountain. Over two successive thousand-year lifespans, he died of old age and reincarnated first as his own son, then again as his own grandson the Black Dragon. Tragically, Fenrirs attacked him as an infant the second time he hatched. He fled, fatally wounded, until Fia found him. Back in the present, Zackary and Quentin free the griffon, so one dragon lunges at Fia. Having finally found someone to cherish, Zavilia reveals his black dragon form to intimidate them.
8	"My Adorable Friend"; Transliteration: "Itooshii Tomodachi" (Japanese: 愛おしい友達)	TBA	TBA	November 21, 2026
The knights cannot believe they are seeing the Black Dragon in person. To protect Fia, Zavilia kills both blue dragons, causing him to grow a horn. Realizing he wants to lead all dragons as the Dragon King, a title marked by growing three horns, he breaks off his single horn since he lacks the power to rule yet. He gives it to Quentin, making him swear to protect Fia until his return. After Zavilia leaves, Zackary forces the knights to treat what they just saw as a Dream Bird hallucination. He interrogates Fia and, despite knowing she is lying, accepts her claim that the Black Dragon caused everything. Fia considers confessing she is a genuine Saint, but panics, knowing the truth puts everyone at risk from the Demon General hunting her. Zackary tells Saviz the Black Dragon returned to its nest, then privately reveals to Cyril and Desmond that Zavilia is Fia's familiar, using the horn as proof. They struggle with treating Fia as a subordinate, fearing it might anger Zavilia. Gideon tries to resign after confessing he already upset them, while Quentin suggests demoting himself to vice-captain and making Fia Captain of the Fourth Brigade Monster Hunters. Cyril rejects this, choosing to wait for more information. Because Fia misses Zavilia terribly, Cyril offers to be her friend until he returns.
9	"Fia, To Sutherland"; Transliteration: "Fīa, Sazarando e" (Japanese: フィーア、サザランドへ)	TBA	TBA	November 28, 2026
Cyril invites Fia on his annual trip to Sutherland, his family's domain, hoping her resemblance to the red-haired Great Saint Serafina will help her serve as a welcome neutral observer in a region still bitter toward knights following a civil war. Fia agrees, secretly hoping to visit the grave of Canopus, the Blue Knight and companion from her past life. She learns naming knights after colours fell out of use centuries ago, and only Great Saint Serafina was ever allowed to wear red. At Savis' office, Fia is unsettled by a massive portrait of her past self, ordered placed there for eternity by the First Commander of the Black Dragon Knights. Upon arriving in Sutherland, Captain Kurtis of Thirteenth Brigade greets them, and Fia discovers Cyril is a Duke, nephew to the former King, and second in line to the throne. Furthermore, she closely resembles Cyril’s late red-haired mother, the Duchess. While local children warmly greet Fia for her red hair and avoid knights like Cyril, Cyril explains that Sutherland remains deeply divided: one faction reveres the red-haired Great Saint, while the other despises red hair because it was the Duchess who began the civil war. Despite the danger, Cyril asks Fia to help peacefully unite the two sides before the upcoming royal memorial ceremony honouring those who died.
10	"The Lament of Sutherland"; Transliteration: "Sazārando no Nageki" (Japanese: サザーランドの嘆き)	TBA	TBA	December 5, 2026

== Reception ==
By June 2024, the series had over 2.7 million copies in circulation.

The series was ranked second in the 2024, 2025, and 2026 editions of Takarajimasha's Kono Light Novel ga Sugoi! guidebook in the tankōbon category. The spin-off series was also ranked seventh in the same category in the 2026 edition.

== See also ==
- Unnamed Memory, another light novel series with the same illustrator
- The Villainess's Guide to (Not) Falling in Love, another light novel series with the same writer
