= The 47 Great Wars =

Japanese manga series

- First tankōbon volume cover (Earth Star Entertainment edition)

四十七大戦 (Shijūshichi Taisen)
- Genre: Action; Comedy
- Manga
- Written by: Hifumi
- Published by: Earth Star Entertainment; Kodansha
- English publisher: US: Kodansha
- Magazine: Comic Earth Star; Magazine Pocket
- Original run: September 7, 2016 – April 13, 2023
- Volumes: 14

The 47 Great Wars (四十七大戦, Shijūshichi Taisen) is a Japanese manga series written and illustrated by Hifumi. It was serialized on Earth Star Entertainment's Comic Earth Star website from September 2016 to June 2020. It was later transferred to Kodansha's Magazine Pocket website where it ran from August 2021 to April 2023.

== Premise ==
The series is a battle royale centered around deities who are representations of Japan's 47 prefectures facing off each other in order to become the country's capital.

== Characters ==
Tottori-san
Voiced by: Nobunaga Shimazaki
Shimane-san
Voiced by: Toshiki Masuda
Hiroshima-san
Voiced by: Shintarō Asanuma

== Publication ==
Written and illustrated by Hifumi, The 47 Great Wars was initially serialized on Earth Star Entertainment's Comic Earth Star website from September 7, 2016, to June 25, 2020. It was later transferred to Kodansha's Magazine Pocket website where it ran from August 26, 2021, to April 13, 2023. Earth Star Entertainment compiled the series chapters into eight tankōbon volumes from March 11, 2017, to May 12, 2020. Kodansha released new editions of the series' volumes from December 9, 2021, to May 9, 2023. The manga is published in the United States on Kodansha's K Manga website and app.

No.	Release date	ISBN
1	March 11, 2017 (ES); December 9, 2021 (K)	978-4-8030-1011-4 (ES); 978-4-06-526292-4 (K)
2	July 12, 2017 (ES); December 9, 2021 (K)	978-4-8030-1069-5 (ES); 978-4-06-526293-1 (K)
3	January 12, 2018 (ES); January 7, 2022 (K)	978-4-8030-1147-0 (ES); 978-4-06-526298-6 (K)
4	July 12, 2018 (ES); January 7, 2022 (K)	978-4-8030-1208-8 (ES); 978-4-06-526299-3 (K)
5	November 12, 2018 (ES); February 9, 2022 (K)	978-4-8030-1245-3 (ES); 978-4-06-526300-6 (K)
6	May 11, 2019 (ES); February 9, 2022 (K)	978-4-8030-1294-1 (ES); 978-4-06-526301-3 (K)
7	October 12, 2019 (ES); March 9, 2022 (K)	978-4-8030-1346-7 (ES); 978-4-06-526302-0 (K)
8	May 12, 2020 (ES); March 9, 2022 (K)	978-4-8030-1418-1 (ES); 978-4-06-526303-7 (K)
9	April 7, 2022	978-4-06-526309-9
10	April 7, 2022	978-4-06-527536-8
11	June 9, 2022	978-4-06-528170-3
12	August 9, 2022	978-4-06-528827-6
13	November 9, 2022	978-4-06-529713-1
14	May 9, 2023	978-4-06-531668-9

== Reception ==
The series won the 2018 Web Manga General Election hosted by Pixiv and Nippon Shuppan Hanbai.
