= Sengoku Komachi Kurōtan =

Japanese light novel series

- First light novel volume cover

戦国小町苦労譚
- Genre: Historical; Science fiction
- Novel series
- Written by: Kyōchikutō
- Published by: Shōsetsuka ni Narō
- Original run: January 27, 2013 – present
- Light novel
- Written by: Kyōchikutō
- Illustrated by: Geko Hirasawa
- Published by: Earth Star Entertainment
- Imprint: Earth Star Novel
- Original run: January 15, 2016 – present
- Volumes: 19
- Manga

Sengoku Komachi Kurōtan: Nōkō Giga
- Written by: Kyōchikutō
- Illustrated by: Hajime Sawada
- Published by: Earth Star Entertainment
- Imprint: Earth Star Comics
- Magazine: Comic Earth Star
- Original run: May 26, 2017 – present
- Volumes: 19

Sengoku Komachi Kurōtan (戦国小町苦労譚; "A Sengoku Period Belle's Labor Story") is a Japanese light novel series written by Kyōchikutō and illustrated by Geko Hirasawa. It began serialization on the user-generated novel publishing website Shōsetsuka ni Narō in January 2013. It was later acquired by Earth Star Entertainment who began publishing it under their Earth Star Novel imprint in January 2016. A manga adaptation illustrated by Hajime Sawada, titled Sengoku Komachi Kurōtan: Nōkō Giga, began serialization on Earth Star Entertainment's Comic Earth Star manga website in May 2017.

== Plot ==
A 21st-century Japanese schoolgirl, Ayanokouji Shizuko, is mysteriously transported to 16th-century Japan. She survives by convincing one of the competing warlords—specifically, Oda Nobunaga—that she can assist his rise to power by improving agricultural production (by using her modern scientific knowledge, though she doesn't tell him that).

Many historical figures appear as supporting characters—Oda Nobunaga, Toyotomi Hideyoshi, Tokugawa Ieyasu, Takeda Shingen, and others—and many agricultural and industrial techniques are described, making the series a form of edutainment. As Shizoku's actions start to change history, the series becomes an alternate history.

== Media ==
=== Light novel ===
Written by Kyōchikutō, Sengoku Komachi Kurōtan began serialization on the user-generated novel publishing website Shōsetsuka ni Narō on January 27, 2013. It was later acquired by Earth Star Entertainment who began publishing it with illustrations by Geko Hirasawa under their Earth Star Novel imprint on January 15, 2016. Nineteen volumes have been released as of March 2026.

No.	Release date	ISBN
1	January 15, 2016	978-4-8030-0859-3
2	May 14, 2016	978-4-8030-0923-1
3	September 15, 2016	978-4-8030-0956-9
4	December 15, 2016	978-4-8030-0978-1
5	April 15, 2017	978-4-8030-1037-4
6	September 15, 2017	978-4-8030-1110-4
7	December 15, 2017	978-4-8030-1141-8
8	April 16, 2018	978-4-8030-1182-1
9	September 15, 2018	978-4-8030-1229-3
10	January 17, 2019	978-4-8030-1261-3
11	July 16, 2019	978-4-8030-1312-2
12	January 16, 2020	978-4-8030-1369-6
13	September 15, 2020	978-4-8030-1451-8
14	April 15, 2021	978-4-8030-1503-4
15	March 16, 2022	978-4-8030-1627-7
16	March 15, 2023	978-4-8030-1767-0
17	March 15, 2024	978-4-8030-1927-8
18	March 14, 2025	978-4-8030-2097-7
19	March 13, 2026	978-4-8030-2288-9

=== Manga ===
A manga adaptation illustrated by Hajime Sawada, titled Sengoku Komachi Kurōtan: Nōkō Giga (戦国小町苦労譚 農耕戯画), began serialization on Earth Star Entertainment's Comic Earth Star manga website on May 26, 2017. Nineteen tankōbon volumes have been released as of December 2025.

No.	Release date	ISBN
1	December 12, 2017	978-4-8030-1134-0
2	April 12, 2018	978-4-8030-1175-3
3	October 12, 2018	978-4-8030-1233-0
4	March 12, 2019	978-4-8030-1277-4
5	October 12, 2019	978-4-8030-1345-0
6	April 11, 2020	978-4-8030-1409-9
7	September 12, 2020	978-4-8030-1449-5
8	February 12, 2021	978-4-8030-1489-1
9	July 12, 2021	978-4-8030-1489-1
10	December 10, 2021	978-4-8030-1574-4
11	May 12, 2022	978-4-8030-1643-7
12	October 12, 2022	978-4-8030-1701-4
13	March 10, 2023	978-4-8030-1759-5
14	September 13, 2023	978-4-8030-1834-9
15	February 9, 2024	978-4-8030-1906-3
16	August 9, 2024	978-4-8030-1994-0
17	February 12, 2025	978-4-8030-2074-8
18	August 8, 2025	978-4-8030-2167-7
19	December 12, 2025	978-4-8030-2233-9

== Reception ==
The series has 2 million copies in circulation as of March 2023.
