= Nobunagun =

Manga series by Masato Hisa and its anime adaptation

- Cover of the first volume of Nobunagun by Earth Star Entertainment, featuring the protagonist Sio Ogura.

ノブナガン (Nobunagan)
- Genre: Action
- Manga
- Written by: Masato Hisa
- Published by: Earth Star Entertainment
- Magazine: Comic Earth Star
- Original run: May 12, 2011 – August 28, 2015
- Volumes: 6
- Anime television series
- Directed by: Nobuhiro Kondō
- Produced by: Manabu Tamura; Hiroaki Tsunoda; Fumihiko Kimura; Norihiro Itō
- Written by: Hiroshi Yamaguchi
- Music by: Yutaka Shinya
- Studio: Bridge
- Licensed by: AUS: Madman Entertainment; NA: Funimation
- Original network: Tokyo MX
- Original run: January 5, 2014 – March 30, 2014
- Episodes: 13

Nobunagun (Japanese: ノブナガン, Hepburn: Nobunagan) is a manga series written and illustrated by Masato Hisa. Serialized in Earth Star Entertainment's magazine Comic Earth Star from May 2011 to August 2015, it has been compiled into six tankōbon volumes. The series follows a high schoolgirl named Sio Ogura, who awakens as one of the E-Gene Holders, a reincarnation of Nobunaga Oda. She joins the Defense Organization aGainst Outer Objects (DOGOO), which specializes in eradicating an alien species known as Evolutionary Invaders (EIs). An anime television series adaptation by studio Bridge was broadcast from January 5, 2014, to March 30, 2014, in Japan. Crunchyroll and Funimation streamed the episodes with English subtitles.

== Plot ==
To protect the world from the impending invasion of the alien species known only as Evolutionary Invaders (EIs), the supranational organization called the Defense Organization aGainst Outer Objects (DOGOO) created special warriors through DNA manipulation called E-Gene Holders. These E-Gene Holders are the reincarnations of various historical figures. Using special weapons called AU spheres, E-Gene Holders can call forth AU weapons with an affinity to their assigned historical figure and use it against the invaders. Sio Ogura is one of them, being the reincarnation of Nobunaga Oda. However, her memories of her past life are limited only by dreams about the military past. Going on a school trip in Taiwan, Sio gets caught in the middle of a battle between the EIs and DOGOO's E-Gene Holders, alongside her classmate Kaoru Asao. When one of the E-Gene Holders, the reincarnation of Jack the Ripper, gets incapacitated and Kaoru ends up in danger when confronting an EI, Sio uses Jack's AU sphere to fully activate her E-Gene Holder status. She gains her AU weapon, a massive machine gun, and assists the other E-Gene Holders to put an end to the Taiwan invasion. After some reluctance, she joins DOGOO at Kaoru's behest.

== Defense Organization aGainst Outer Objects (DOGOO) ==
There are two E-Gene Holder platoons stationed on each of DOGOO's three floating fortresses: the Alex Rogan (the Second Platoon's headquarters), the Joji Atsumi and the Steven Hiller. The auxiliary battleship Clayton Forrester holds the three together. The floating fortresses circle above the Pacific Ocean so when reports of an EI reach them, the nearest floating fortress will send their platoon to engage the enemies.

== Characters ==
=== Main characters ===
The main characters in the series are part of the DOGOO's Second Platoon.

Sio Ogura (小椋 しお, Ogura Shio)
Voiced by: Shiori Mutō (Japanese); Jad Saxton (English)
The main protagonist in the series, she is a Japanese student who attends an all-girls high school, and the E-Gene Holder of Nobunaga Oda. Her AU weapon is the Nobunagun (ノブナガン, Nobunagan) (Voiced by: Nobuo Tobita (Japanese); Kent Williams (English)). She is clumsy, but likes military equipment, which her classmates find weird (not shown much in the manga). Even her comrades in DOGOO sees her as a military otaku. One of her only friends in school is Kaoru, whom she saves in the first anime episode and first manga chapter. Following the Kaohsiung incident, she is recruited to DOGOO (chapter 4 in the manga and episode 2 in the anime), where she specializes as a sniper and strategist. Over the course of the series, she develops feelings for Adam.
Adam Muirhead (アダム・ミューアヘッド, Adamu Mūaheddo)
Voiced by: Tatsuhisa Suzuki (Japanese); Jason Liebrecht (English)
One of the first DOGOO members that Sio encounters, Adam is the E-Gene Holder of Jack the Ripper, and his AU weapon is a large hunting knife. Though he and Sio team up in various missions, they still get irritated with each other at times. During the Stone Forest Operation, he transforms his weapon into Nightingale Mode, which channels the spirit of Florence Nightingale. He also develops feelings for Sio, even kissing her in episode 13.
Mahesh Mirza (マヘシュ・ミルザ, Maheshu Miruza)
Voiced by: Nobunaga Shimazaki (Japanese); Christopher Bevins (English)
Mahesh likes cute girls and often enjoys teasing Sio. He is the E-Gene Holder of Mahatma Gandhi, and his AU weapon produces shields. He does not like his power to create shields as barriers (in the manga) or forcefields (in the anime).
Jess Beckham (ジェス・ベッカム, Jesu Bekkamu)
Voiced by: Yū Asakawa (Japanese); Caitlin Glass (English)
Jess is the only other female in the Second Platoon. She easily befriends Sio when the latter joins. She is the E-Gene Holder of Isaac Newton, an AU weapon that enables her to manipulate gravity with the only drawback being that the target must be under her massive right foot. She French kisses anyone, including Jack and Sio when they went to the Alex Rogan in anime episode 5.

=== Defense Organization aGainst Outer Objects (DOGOO) ===
Some of the characters' real names are unknown, and are thus referred to by their weapons which carry the spirits of various historical figures.

==== First Platoon ====
Lemon (レモン, Remon)
Voiced by: Chiwa Saitō (Japanese); Alison Viktorin (English)
A short-haired woman who is the E-Gene Holder for Geronimo. Her AU weapon is a tomahawk.
Ibukigīn "Esui" Erdenbileg (イブキギーン・食べ物・エルデネビルグ, Ibukigīn Erudenebirugu)
Voiced by: Mutsumi Tamura (Japanese); Elizabeth Maxwell (English)
A woman who can transform her body into a motorcycle-like machine named Cyx (スーホ, Sūho), albeit with treads instead of wheels. She dotes on Lemon, whom she calls Princess.
Antoni Gaudí (アントニ・ガウデ, Antoni Gaudi)
Voiced by: Ayumu Murase (Japanese); Sean Michael Teague (English)
A young boy who is the E-Gene Holder of Antoni Gaudí. His AU ability allows him to cause large sheets of rock to erupt from any ground he touches, even to enclosing an entire town in a hemispherical dome in episode 11. It seems in episode 6 of the anime that he is a fan of Sio. Then he acquires a bikini photo of Sio that Capa took in episode 3.

==== Special Ops Team ====
Each Special Ops Team member's AU sphere is a tool rather than a weapon.

François Vidocq (フランソワ・ヴィドック, Furansowa Vidokku)
Voiced by: Akira Ishida (Japanese); Josh Grelle (English)
An arrogant young man who is the E-Gene Holder of Eugène François Vidocq. His AU tool is a chair that allows him to calculate various things with the speed of a supercomputer.
John Hunter (ジョン·ハンター, Jon Hantā)
Voiced by: Makoto Yasumura (Japanese); Ian Sinclair (English)
A slender man who is the E-Gene Holder of surgeon John Hunter. His AU tool allows him to examine the bodies of the EIs using a set of surgical and analytical tools. He is dragged into combat during the Stone Forest Operation (anime episodes 10 to 13); during which he makes a discovery about the blood of EIs that leads to the success of the operation.
Galiko (ガリ子, Gariko)
Voiced by: Sumire Uesaka (Japanese); Alexis Tipton (English)
A young girl who is the E-Gene Holder of Galileo Galilei. Her AU tool encloses her in a miniature planetarium. She has binocular vision as well as four detachable spherical remote sensor probes named after the Galilean moons of Jupiter. Her probes allow her to see and hear, as well as collect data; however, they must join with her AU weapon to transmit the data. Without her AU sphere activated, she is actually quite young compared to the rest of the crew. She has a crush on Vidocq.

==== Upper Echelon ====
Commander (壱与, Iyo)
Voiced by: Ai Satō (Japanese); Rachel Robinson (English)
Leader of the organization DOGOO. She has lived for almost 1,800 years, thanks to the alien Dogoo.
Dogoo (土偶, Dogō)
Voiced by: Akeno Watanabe (Japanese); Monica Rial (English)
Not to be confused with the organization DOGOO, is an alien whose world was destroyed by the EIs centuries ago, who came to Earth to stop a repeat of the process by collecting the souls of several various distinguished individuals, turning them into "E-Genes" and imputing them into different bloodlines around the world; it would be these E-Genes that would be unknowingly passed down from parent to child until its host awoke and became an E-Gene Holder.
Saint-Germain (サンジェルマン, Sanjeruman)
Voiced by: Kōji Yusa (Japanese); J. Michael Tatum (English)
Second-in-command of DOGOO. He is the Count of St. Germain, who is immortal and has been with the Commander since being asked for help by DOGOO. He is not seen much in the manga but a lot in the anime.

==== Other platoons ====
- E-Gene Holders in the Third Platoon include Dai Zong from Water Margin, George Hackenschmidt, and Grigori Rasputin.
- E-Gene Holders in the Fourth Platoon include Vincent van Gogh, Wolfgang Amadeus Mozart, and Cesare Borgia.
- E-Gene Holders in the Sixth Platoon include Nostradamus and Alfred Nobel.

=== Unaffiliated ===
Some characters are not affiliated with a DOGOO platoon, but are E-Gene Holders:

Annus (アヌシュ, Anushu)
Voiced by: Kenjiro Tsuda (Japanese); Christopher R. Sabat (English)
A wheelchair-using older man who trains new members. He is the E-Gene Holder of Robert Capa, and his AU weapon is a camera that allows him to duplicate any person or object and use its abilities for several minutes. Though he feels Sio is not much cut out to be a sniper, her natural instincts are not something to be overlooked.

- Other E-Gene Holders include Babe Ruth, William Tell, and Christopher Columbus.

=== Other characters ===
Kaoru Asao (浅尾 かおる, Asao Kaoru)
Voiced by: Haruno Inoue (Japanese); Mikaela Krantz (English)
A popular student in Sio's school and the only one who befriended Sio during their field trip to Kaohsiung. Kaoru wanted to become friends with Sio ever since long ago, which is explained more in the anime. After Sio rescues her when the EIs attack (chapter 1 in the manga and episode 1 in the anime), Kaoru is inspired to help out and studies to become a nurse (anime episode 9).

== Media ==
=== Manga ===
The forty-one manga chapters of Nobunagun are written and illustrated by Masato Hisa. They were serialized for the manga anthology book Comic Earth Star from Earth Star Entertainment, running from May 12, 2011 to August 28, 2015, on the online edition of the magazine. Earth Star Entertainment has been collecting the chapters in tankōbon volumes with the first being published on February 10, 2012. A total of six volumes have been released in Japan as of October 9, 2015.

| No. | Release date | ISBN |
|---|---|---|
| 1 | February 10, 2012 | 978-4-8030-0308-6 |
| 2 | January 12, 2013 | 978-4-8030-0414-4 |
| 3 | September 12, 2013 | 978-4-8030-0504-2 |
| 4 | December 12, 2013 | 978-4-8030-0519-6 |
| 5 | December 12, 2014 | 978-4-8030-0620-9 |
| 6 | October 9, 2015 | 978-4-8030-0792-3 |

=== Anime ===
The production of an anime adaptation was first announced through the June 2013 issue of Comic Earth Star. It was produced by the animation studio Bridge, directed by Nobuhiro Kondo and scripted by Hiroshi Yamaguchi. On December 25, 2013, a preview of the series was exhibited in the Shinbashi Yakult Hall. Tokyo MX, on January 5, 2014, broadcast the first episode, which was subsequently aired by YTV, CTV, BS11, and AT-X. The thirteenth and last episode was aired on March 30, 2014. VAP released episodes 1–6 in a DVD and Blu-ray box set on April 23, 2014, and episodes 7–13 on July 23, 2014. An English-subtitled version started to be streamed by Crunchyroll on January 5, and by Funimation on their video website on the following day. In March, Madman Entertainment announced at the Wai-Con it have acquired the series' rights. Funimation released the complete series into a DVD and Blu-ray box set on June 2, 2015, in a regular and a limited edition, while Madman Entertainment will release it on July 1, 2015.

The series music is composed by Yutaka Shinya. The opening theme is "Respect for the Dead Man" by Pay Money to My Pain, which is also used as the ending theme for the first episode. The "ver．α" of "Chīsa na Hoshi" (ちいさな星; lit. 'A Small Star') by Shiori Mutō, Yū Asakawa and Sumire Uesaka is used as the ending theme from episode two to five, and from episode 11 to 13. Episodes 6 to 10 feature a "ver.β" of "Chīsa na Hoshi" by Shiori Mutō, Chiwa Saitō, Mutsumi Tamura and Ayumu Murase. An official soundtrack was released on February 19, 2014; it consists of the full and the television version of "ver．α" and "ver.β" "Chīsa na Hoshi", and 30 other tracks.

| No. | Title | Original release date |
|---|---|---|
| 1 | "Oda Nobunaga" "Oda Nobunaga" (織田信長) | January 5, 2014 |
Shown as a military otaku, Sio Ogura has a nightmare about the death of Nobunaga Oda. Despite oversleeping, Sio makes it to school in time for the field trip to Kaohsiung. She quickly befriends a popular student named Kaoru Asao. However, things change for the worst when Sio witnesses strange creatures called Evolutionary Invaders (EIs) appearing from the coast of Taiwan. A young man named Adam Muirhead, the E-Gene Holder of Jack the Ripper, arrives to cut down some EIs with his AU weapon, a large hunting knife. He is momentarily stabbed in the stomach by another EI and collapses when Sio tries to save Kaoru. Upon touching Adam's AU sphere, Sio remembers her past life and becomes the E-Gene Holder of Nobunaga. Once she activates the Nobunagun, she starts shooting at the EIs from point-blank range.
| 2 | "Evolutionary Invaders" "Shinka Shinryaku-tai" (進化侵略体) | January 12, 2014 |
Sio fights off the EIs while Adam rescues Kaori. The EIs are finally eradicated, thanks to the timely arrival of Adam's associates named Jess Beckham and Mahesh Mirza, the respective E-Gene Holders of Isaac Newton and Mahatma Gandhi. Mahesh's AU weapon creates forcefields, while Jess's AU weapon manipulates gravity. However, a lone EI slips by and pierces a landing ship EI, causing an explosion that destroys much of the bay. Sio visits Kaoru in the hospital, where Kaoru admits that Sio is cool for being a military otaku. A worldwide public announcement about the cause of the Defense Organization aGainst Outer Objects (DOGOO) is given by the Commander, who also requests Sio to join as a member. With many civilians divided in supporting the cause, Sio refuses to join DOGOO until Kaoru lends some support.
| 3 | "Capa's Island" "Kyapa no Shima" (キャパの島) | January 19, 2014 |
Sio accept the offer to join DOGOO. In an indoor training facility on an island, she receives intense training from Annus, the E-Gene Holder of Robert Capa. Annus's AU weapon manifests simulations captured from his camera. Sio also deals with strict rules of no outside communication set by second-in-command of DOGOO named Saint-Germain. She comes across Harold S. Conway, who is a part of a hurricane research team of soldiers, revealed to be fans of Sio. As her training continues, Annus forces Sio to battle against illusions of herself. Later on, Harold and the hurricane research team set off in a jet on a recon mission to track Hurricane Olga at the Gulf of Mexico off the Floridian border. However, the jet is shot down by an EI hidden in the winds of the hurricane.
| 4 | "Hurricane" "Harikēn" (ハリケーン) | January 26, 2014 |
Annus deploys Sio serving as the sniper and Adam serving as the backup on a mission from a jet to neutralize the EI inside Hurricane Olga before it reaches inland. They are joined by Special Ops Team member Galiko serving as the spotter. She is the E-Gene Holder of Galileo Galilei, and her AU tool is binocular vision. The EI is seen carrying dozens of eggs, which will hatch on dry land if they drop into the gulf below. With only one shot at killing the EI, Sio ends up jumping out of the jet to defeat the EI, only to realize it was a transporter EI fused with a carrier EI. The carrier EI releases twelve eggs before Adam manages to kill it. Sio uses Nobunagun to propel Adam towards each of the eggs for him to destroy with his hunting knife. The alien Dogoo tells the Commander that the EIs have a communications network and an overmind guiding their evolutionary strategy. On a side note, Sio starts to develop feelings for Adam.
| 5 | "The Second Platoon" "Daini Shōtai" (第二小隊) | February 2, 2014 |
The Commander assigns Sio and Adam to the Second Platoon, of which Mahesh and Jess are the other members. Sio and Adam visit the headquarters of the Second Platoon called the Alex Rogan. It is revealed that the Alex Rogan, the Joji Atsumi and the Steven Hiller are floating fortresses over the Pacific Ocean, while the Clayton Forrester is the auxiliary battleship. Mahesh clarifies that an E-Gene Holder's personality alters when a AU sphere is activated. Special Ops Team member François Vidocq informs the Upper Echelon that scattered fragments of EIs shockingly came from the exploded landing ship EI in Taiwan. The Second Platoon and the Special Ops Team get acquainted with each other as the mission is to destroy an EI with an impenetrable armor. While Adam, Mahesh and Jess serve as decoys, Sio eventually shoots down the armored EI after pinpointing a gap found above its neck. Vidocq discovers that the messenger EIs act like parasites and live inside the brain of their host. They disperse into the sea when their host dies, and they travel up the food chain and through animal migration without being digested.
| 6 | "Monster Meat" "Kaijū no Niku" (カイジュウノニク) | February 9, 2014 |
While completing a mission, the First Platoon is forced to make an emergency landing in the Alaskan mountains during the blizzard. Antoni Gaudí guards a prisoner EI in the plane, while Lemon and Ibukigīn "Esui" Erdenbileg investigate a nearby building. Lemon and Esui are served food by a man named Gonda, who allows them to use his radio, but there is no signal. After he invites them to stay the night, Lemon secretly tells Esui that the radio wires were cut. Lemon and Esui retreat back to the plane, only to be pursued by Gonda, forcing them to escape back into the building. Finding a camcorder as evidence, Lemon and Esui learn that Gonda became a madman after accidentally eating monster meat from an EI, murdering his friends in retaliation for pulling such a prank. As Gonda makes his way to the plane, Gaudí is unable to stop him. After Gonda releases the prisoner EI, it consequently kills him. As Lemon and Esui meet up with Gaudí at the plane, they kill the EI and make their way back to the Alex Rogan.
| 7 | "Musashi Wonder" "Musashi Wandā" (ムサシ・ワンダー) | February 16, 2014 |
The Upper Echelon informs the Second Platoon that an EI has taken control of the Japanese battleship Musashi, dubbing it the Musashi Wonder EI, and is headed towards the Panama Canal. With the United States Navy (USN) planning to nuke the Musashi Wonder EI, the Second Platoon is tasked with sinking it instead. The Special Ops Team joins the Second Platoon in this mission, as it is reported that the Musashi Wonder EI is harboring eggs and is far more advanced than previous EIs. In fact, the Musashi Wonder EI is a network of engineers surrounded by a core. The USN lends the USS John C. Stennis and cooperates with DOGOO for the mission. Mahesh protects Sio when she blasts through the tower of the Musashi Wonder EI, allowing Adam and Jess to infiltrate the battleship and destroy the eggs. Sio takes it upon herself to personally sink the Musashi Wonder EI, though the core engulfs her. As Adam comes to the rescue, Sio manages to destroy the core, which finally sinks the Musashi Wonder EI. The Special Ops Team safely evacuate the Second Platoon, who goes on shore leave afterwards.
| 8 | "Tunnel" "Ton'neru" (トンネル) | February 23, 2014 |
Vidocq learns that the messenger EIs travel via undersea tunnel through the Panama Canal. The First Platoon confirms that the undersea tunnel is located in the Costa Rican seafloor. With Gaudí on lookout, Lemon and Esui investigate the undersea tunnel, finding out that many arthropod EIs live in its caves. A giant cephalopod EI suddenly pursues the First Platoon out of the undersea tunnel, grabbing one of Galiko's probes that contains vital data. The Second Platoon intercepts and prevents the cephalopod EI from crushing the probe, causing it to retreat. Later on, Sio is shocked that Vidocq does not care about the critical condition of Galiko, much to the worry of Special Ops Team member John Hunter. The First Platoon and the Second Platoon set out to attack the left and right tentacles of the cephalopod EI. However, the severed tentacles regenerate after they unleash arthropod EIs that detonate on impact. Sio realizes that the cephalopod EI plans to bum-rush the Clayton Forrester. She manages to blast through the deck of the Clayton Forrester, sending another arthropod EI to detonate far away. A piece of rubble hits Sio on the face, knocking her unconscious and overboard.
| 9 | "Sio and Kaoru" "Shio to Kaoru" (しおとかおる) | March 2, 2014 |
Vidocq reviews that the engineer and land mine EIs are arthropods, while the battleship EIs are cephalopods. This notes that the EIs regressed their evolutionary stages from vertebrates to invertebrates. The undersea tunnel acts like a honeycomb for the arthropods, whereas the cephalopod guards the undersea tunnel at its nest, mimicking a cell storehouse and an ammunition factory. Meanwhile, Kaoru visits Sio in a Japanese hospital while she recovers with a bruised head and a sprained ankle. Kaoru figures out that Sio has a crush on Adam, while Sio learns that Kaoru plans to study nursing. When multiple EIs make landfall in Tokyo Bay, Sio calls the Alex Rogan to send a descent pod for an emergency AU sphere drop. An EI approaches a bus full of children, but Saint-Germain suddenly rams the EI with his car, which explodes and seemingly kills him. The bus manages to depart when Kaoru distracts the EI. Sio musters enough strength to summon Nobunagun from her fingertip and kills the EI. Adam timely arrives in a descent pod when more EIs show up, while Sio faints from exhaustion. In the aftermath, Saint-Germain is revealed to still be alive.
| 10 | "DOGOO" (DOGOO) | March 9, 2014 |
In the past, the Commander was scouted by Dogoo after her village was destroyed 1,800 years ago. The Commander periodically awakened from cryogenic sleep for centuries when Dogoo collected and converted various E-Genes. After the Commander first met Saint-Germain, the Commander chose to abandon Dogoo, though Saint-Germain followed the Commander as a companion throughout the years. Although the Commander aged dramatically, Saint-Germain remained ageless. After their cottage was burned down during a war, the Commander had a change of heart and returned to Dogoo with Saint-Germain by her side. The Commander later became in charge of DOGOO the organization, while Dogoo the alien was preserved in the Commander's cryogenic chamber after starting to deteriorate from the passage of time. In the present, the First Platoon and the Second Platoon monitor the battleship EI at both entrances of the undersea tunnel. It is hypothesized that the battleship EI is creating a distraction while the base cell EIs are digging another tunnel towards Lake Nicaragua. A plan is devised to dig a diverting undersea tunnel in order to lure the base cell EIs to Upala. Sio, Adam, Mahesh, Jess, Lemon, Esui, Gaudí, Hunter and Annus will collaborate in this mission.
| 11 | "Operation Stone Forest, Part 1" "Sutōn Foesuto Sakusen Zenpen" (ストーンフォレスト作戦・前編) | March 16, 2014 |
The nine E-Gene Holders initiate Operation Stone Forest. Sio and the JS Hyūga full of M1A2 Abrams tanks distract the battleship EI at the Costa Rican seafloor. Annus and Jess disorient the equilibrium of the base cell EIs at Lake Nicaragua. Adam, Lemon, Gaudí and Hunter take out some base cell EIs outside Upala before they burrow back underground. Mahesh and Esui dig an entrance in Upala and force out more base cell EIs. The three floating fortresses release descent pods, causing the battleship EI to wrap its tentacles around them. This gives clearance for the M1A2 Abrams tanks to fire missiles at the tentacles of the battleship EI, causing the land mine EIs inside the tentacles to detonate. Sio finally guns down the battleship EI between the eyes, but a second battleship EI with four tentacles emerges from underwater and captures Sio.
| 12 | "Operation Stone Forest, Part 2" "Sutōn Foesuto Sakusen Kōhen" (ストーンフォレスト作戦・後編) | March 23, 2014 |
Mahesh, Esui and Gaudí manage to isolate the base cell EIs in Upala. Adam and Lemon compete over slaughtering the most base cell EIs, though Esui arrives to assist Lemon. Mahesh comes to help Hunter fight off a base cell EI, though Hunter breaks down when he kills it and its blood splatters on him. Meanwhile, the captured Sio disengages Nobunagun from her right arm and reengages it from her right leg. However, the second battleship EI manages to shield its weak point between the eyes. Vidocq points out that the second battleship EI is able to adapt after being born from the first battleship EI. Although Sio manages to shoot off its right eye, the land mine EIs detonate from its head. More base cell EIs slip past Adam and attack Mahesh while ignoring Hunter. Having survived the explosion, Sio refuses to deactivate Nobunagun. After dissecting the dead base cell EI, Hunter discovers that the EIs rely on pheromones instead of eyesight in order to determine friend from foe. Thanks to a vision of Jack the Ripper, Adam rescues Sio from being killed by the second battleship EI. Adam transforms his AU weapon into Nightingale mode.
| 13 | "Nobunagun" "Nobunagan" (ノブナガン) | March 30, 2014 |
In the past, Dogoo collected the E-Gene of Florence Nightingale, who previously killed infected women who carried a disease in their organs. Nightingale assumed the identity of Jack the Ripper thereafter. In the present, Adam realizes that his Nightingale mode only activates when mankind is at the brink of extinction with Sio as its hinge. At Upala, a new EI guards the transport EIs but attacks the base cell EIs. With help of the M1A2 Abrams tanks aiming at the head of the second battleship EI, Adam uses the force of the tank missiles in order to slash into its head. Mahesh, Lemon, Esui, Gaudí and Hunter manage to slaughter the new EI in a synchronized attack, while Sio manages to kill the second battleship EI by destroying its brain from the inside. With the mission deemed a success, all nine E-Gene Holders take a deep nap back at the Alex Rogan. Adam and Lemon are surprised that Hunter slaughtered the most EIs. The nine E-Gene Holders and Vidocq all visit Galiko in the hospital. Sio later thanks Adam for rescuing her, despite him being ordered by a voice in his head. Adam kisses Sio, who then gets a nosebleed.

== Reception ==
Anime News Network (ANN)'s reviewers have had different opinions on it. About the premise Carl Kimlinger commented "Sound ridiculous? It is. Ridiculously so. But it's also ridiculously fun." Hope Chapman, on the other hand, criticized its story and animation, asserting it "isn't a terrible show," it is "a cheap imitation of other styles and ideas, and without the looks to compensate, its lack of brains isn't very entertaining." Although criticized it for its generic premise, Theron Martin praised its animation and capacity of entertaining. Martin and Rebecca Silverman commended its "striking visuals" and "visual tricks" respectively. Martin, Silverman, Andy Hanley of UK Anime Network and Nicole MacLean from THEM Anime Reviews praised Sio's characterization, with the latter calling it one of "the show's biggest strengths". Hanley commented that "its opening episode has been one of the most directly exciting and thrilling of the winter season—a rip-roaring action packed affair that continued into an equally enjoyable second episode." He added, "Nobunagun has managed to exceed our expectations, even if those expectations were 'this will probably be terrible'."

Browne praised the action of "these early episodes" as "well-animated and entertaining". However, Browne stated that it "evolves into a missed opportunity almost immediately" due to "the combination of shallowness and technobabble-ridden battle scenes" and "the sexual harassment jokes". Martin The Fandom Post's Thomas Zoth called it "a delight to watch" and stressed, "Fans of shounen anime, yuri undertones, or action series like Hellsing will probably want to check this out." Another critic from The Fandom Post, Kory Cerjak, wrote that the plot is generic "[b]ut Nobunagun is incredibly fun and the visuals of fighting against the EIOs are incredible." Cerjak pointed the anime feels natural, saying "Execution is key in Nobunagun, and it is above average here." Commenting on the last episode, however, Cerjak questioned "Everything returns to the status quo and, while it was fun, I wonder what the point of the entire show was at this point." He declared, "I think its good parts outweigh the bad…that is if you just straight up skip over the bad parts", though. Despite its "flaws, a great cast of characters, striking visuals, strong musical score and voice acting, and a high-spirited sense of fun help establish the title as a worthy entry in the action genre", according to Martin.
