= Pupa (manga) =

Japanese manga series

- Cover of the first manga volume.

ピューパ (Pyūpa)
- Genre: Body horror, psychological horror
- Manga
- Written by: Sayaka Mogi
- Published by: Earth Star Entertainment
- Imprint: Earth Star Comics
- Magazine: Comic Earth Star
- Original run: March 12, 2011 – December 12, 2013
- Volumes: 5
- Anime television series
- Directed by: Tomomi Mochizuki
- Produced by: Atsushi Iwanami; Gorō Shinjuku; Yutaka Gotō
- Written by: Tomomi Mochizuki
- Music by: Kayo Konishi (MOKA☆); Yukio Kondoo (MOKA☆)
- Studio: Studio Deen
- Licensed by: Crunchyroll (expired)
- Original network: Sun TV, Tokyo MX
- Original run: January 9, 2014 – March 28, 2014
- Episodes: 12

Pupa (Japanese: ピューパ, Hepburn: Pyūpa) is a 2011–2013 Japanese horror manga series written and illustrated by Sayaka Mogi. An anime television series adaptation produced by Studio Deen premiered on January 9, 2014. Both are notable for their extreme graphic violence.

== Plot ==
The story of Pupa is about two teenagers, Utsutsu and his little sister Yume. Their father was an extremely abusive man, beating their mother and then his children after he was fired. After a divorce, their mother began dating another man, and the father left the two kids alone. Now abandoned, Utsutsu promised himself that he would always protect Yume.

After seeing red butterflies, these two siblings become infected with a virus known as Pupa. This virus mutates organisms into insatiable monsters, only seeking to feed on any sort of life. Yume succumbs to the full effects of the Pupa virus, but reverts into a human. Utsutsu, instead of turning into a monster, gains regenerative powers. In order for the virus to be suppressed in Yume, Utsutsu must take a drug and have Yume feed on his flesh.

== Characters ==
Utsutsu Hasegawa (長谷川 現, Hasegawa Utsutsu)
Voiced by: Nobunaga Shimazaki, Mariya Ise (young)
Yume's older brother. Due to having a sister complex, he cares very deeply for Yume. His most prominent facial feature is a scar around his left eye, which is the product of his father's abuse. Also conspicuous are the many round wounds that almost cover his entire body, that are in fact burns left when his father extinguished his cigars on him, and his flower hair clip. After being infected by the Pupa virus, Utsutsu gains the ability to heal his wounds and regenerate lost limbs. Thus, he acts as a living food source to satisfy his sister's hunger for flesh after she was infected by the virus. Although depicted as warm and somewhat outgoing, he has a tendency to turn sadistic, much like his father, going on a murderous rampage when frustrated.
In later chapters, he also gains the ability to metamorphose into a flesh-eating monster, which looks like a black butterfly. However, it is revealed that the red butterflies never infected the Hasegawa siblings, merely awakening their instincts as monsters, since Yume was a monster all along and Utsutsu was infected by her. As a child, Utsutsu attempted to save Yume from an oncoming truck, but ended up getting himself killed instead (unaware that Yume was a monster and could easily heal herself); Yume then "revived" him as a monster by feeding him some of her flesh. By feeding her flesh to him, she left an imprint of herself in him, which is why Utsutsu sees Yume as an emotional crutch. The scar over his eye was actually inflicted by Yume, and Utsutsu was simply in denial and blamed his father for it.
Yume Hasegawa (長谷川 夢, Hasegawa Yume)
Voiced by: Ibuki Kido
Utsutsu's innocent and sweet younger sister and a victim of the Pupa virus. She loves her brother and has always looked up to him. If she is famished, a hideous monstrosity emerges from her body like a red butterfly emerging from its pupa. Much to her horror, the monster then proceeds to eat any flesh it can, including that of humans.
Yume is actually one of two ancient immortal monsters that had the bad luck to be found in larval form by Maria, then being kept and experimented on for 30 years. She escaped, leaving her mate Yuu behind, and impregnates Sachiko Hasegawa, being reborn as a human girl (even sharing Sachiko's DNA) and losing her memories of being a monster. As a child, she lacked common sense because she was adapting to her human body and behaved like a monster. She is the one who gave Utsutsu the scar across his eye, and was also responsible for metamorphosing him into a monster like her.
Sachiko Hasegawa (長谷川 幸子, Hasegawa Sachiko)
Voiced by: Mamiko Noto
Utsutsu's and Yume's sensitive mother. She cares for her biological son, but is fearful of her daughter, knowing she is a monster. After she and Shirō divorced, she began dating a young man, leaving Utsutsu and Yume alone.
In fact, she is now a permanent resident of Bizen's hospital, having been driven insane because of Yume. On the day that she gave birth to Utsutsu, a monster escaped from the laboratory, impregnating Sachiko and being born as a human named Yume. Sachiko attempted abortion to kill her, but she failed each time since Yume was immortal. She became increasingly paranoid until she finally left the house.
Shirō Onijima (鬼島 四郎, Onijima Shirō)
Voiced by: Kōji Yusa
Utsutsu's and Yume's cold and abusive father, who works for a mysterious organization. He searches obsessively for Utsutsu and wants to know the truth about the Pupa virus, since his son became infected with it. He was abusive towards Sachiko because he knew that Yume wasn't his daughter, but, not knowing about the Pupa virus, he believed that Sachiko had been unfaithful. After finding out the truth about Yume's origin, he attempts to protect Utsutsu in his own way.
It is revealed that he is unstable because as a child he was an orphan raised by Genjurou Imari (Maria's grandfather) who was an artist. Genjurou abused Shiro and kept him as a plaything, claiming that pain was the purest form of love. After Genjurou died, Shiro adopted his philosophy, abusing Sachiko and Utsutsu in an attempt to show them the "love" he was taught.
Maria (マリア, Maria) / Ai Imari (伊万里 愛, Imari Ai)
Voiced by: Kyōko Narumi
A mysterious woman who seems to have knowledge of the Pupa virus and is currently conducting experiments regarding it. She has a pet cat named Seto. Her research has given her a cold view toward human life. She is willing to sacrifice the lives of many innocent people to gain information about the effects of the virus. In return for being able to examine them, she gives Utsutsu a drug that temporarily suppresses his sister's rampage. Unlike Sachiko, she plans to give birth to these monsters from the cells she obtained from the Hasegawa siblings.
Makoto Hotoki (仏木)
Voiced by: Kenjiro Tsuda
An associate of Maria's and her older brother. It is said his mother gave birth to the demon "Ai" instead of Juzo Hotoki. Finding her first impression restless then noticed she was interested in the contents of animals. He scarred Maria's face for tormenting his precious dolls and felt pitiful for not understanding. Since then, he devoted himself into helping Maria's research of the Pupa virus on Onigashima island.
Yūhei Arita (有田 雄平, Arita Yūhei)
Voiced by: Shiori Mikami (young)
Utsutsu's classmate and close friend who insists on staying in touch.
Yuu (ユウ, Yū)
A mysterious man who appears to guide the Hasegawa siblings. Despite appearing human, he claims to be a monster of the red butterflies who has lived for many generations on the remote island of Onigashima, and explains the reason why Utsutsu and Yume were infected. He is searching for his lost mate, who he claims is Yume.
In fact, he is one of two ancient immortal monsters that had been uncovered in larval form by Maria, then being kept and experimented on for 30 years. His mate escaped, leaving him behind, and was reborn as Yume, losing all of her memories of him. He envies Utsutsu for Yume to have chosen over him.

== Media ==
=== Manga ===
The manga series Pupa is written and illustrated by Sayaka Mogi and was serialized in Earth Star Entertainment's Comic Earth Star magazine between March 12, 2011, and December 12, 2013. An extra chapter was published in the magazine's February 2014 issue. Additionally, the series was compiled in five tankōbon volumes, which were published under the Earth Star Comics imprint between November 11, 2011, and February 12, 2014.

==== Volumes ====
No.	Original release date	Original ISBN	English release date	English ISBN
1	November 11, 2011	978-4803002898	November 8, 2012	—
2	June 12, 2012	978-4803003420	—	—
3	January 12, 2013	978-4803004151	—	—
4	September 12, 2013	978-4803005028	—	—
5	February 12, 2014	978-4803005356	—	—

=== Anime ===
An anime adaptation produced by Studio Deen and directed by Tomomi Mochizuki with character designs by Maki Fujii premiered on January 9, 2014, following a delay from its initial October 2013 premiere. Each episode is exactly four minutes long, and was simulcast by Crunchyroll. The series' first eight episodes were screened in advance on December 21, 2013, at the Aeon Cinema Makuhari Shintoshin theater in Chiba Prefecture. The anime adaptation was one of the most anticipated after its announcement, however after its release it was harshly criticized for the short duration of the episodes and the mediocre adaptation of the original work, crowning it as one of the worst anime in history.
