= Karin Isobe =

Japanese voice actress

- 礒部 花凜
- Born: May 26, 1994 (age 32); Nara Prefecture, Japan
- Other names: Karirin, The Aristocrat of Amuse
- Occupations: Voice actress; Singer
- Years active: 2014–present
- Agent: Amuse
- Height: 157 cm (5 ft 2 in)
- Musical career
- Genres: J-pop; Anison
- Instrument: Vocals
- Years active: 2015–present

Karin Isobe (礒部 花凜, Isobe Karin; born May 26, 1994) is a Japanese actress, voice actress, and singer from Nara Prefecture. She is currently affiliated with Amuse Inc.

== About ==
Isobe was born in Nara Prefecture on May 26, 1994. As a child she loved theater and acting and is also a fan of various anime shows since her student days. Her interest for singing began after a friend's mother gave her tickets to a theatrical play that she couldn't attend.

She graduated from Osaka University of Arts' Department of Performing Arts.

As a theatrical actress she worked in various theatrical roles closely related to anime (which she calls "2.5 dimensional stage productions"), including a leading role in the musical "Hakuoki: Harada Sanosuke arc" which made her increasingly interested to take on voice acting in earnest.

While her career in voice-acting began with video game Mahocole, where she also sings the game's soundtracks, Isobe's singing career began in 2015 through television anime Go! Princess Precure where she sang the opening theme.

She was the Nara representative for Miss Universe Japan in 2014.

Isobe formerly belonged to agency office EFFECT until 2015 where she moved to Office EN-JIN. In 2018, she announced her departure from the agency to become a freelancer. In March 2019, Isobe joined Amuse.

In 2019, she became a part of newly formed vocal & performance unit BlooDye as one of the vocalist along with Kanako Takatsuki.

In 2021, Isobe formed a choir unit Healer Girls along with Akane Kumada, Marina Horiuchi, and Chihaya Yoshitake.

In June 2023, she formed the spin-off unit “MIX JUICE from AmuBo ch,” along with Moeka Koizumi and Yurie Funato, which originated from the YouTube channel “AMUSE VOICE ACTORS CHANNEL”. It was during this time that Kaori Maeda gave her the nickname "The Aristocrat of Amuse" because of her hobby of collecting tea and tableware, and for enjoying afternoon tea or fine dining with her mother.

Her special skills includes Jazz dance, Nihon-buyō, Ballet, and piano.

== Notable works ==
=== Anime ===
- Just Because! (2017) as Mio Natsume
- Rifle Is Beautiful (2017) as Tae Nakagawa
- Interspecies Reviewers (2020) as Mii
- Iwa-Kakeru! Climbing Girls (2020) as Hifumi Benibana
- Assault Lily Fruits (2021) as Takane Miyagawa
- Petit Sekai (2022) as Saki Tenma
- Healer Girl (2022) as Kana Fujii
- Immoral Guild (2022) as Hitamu Kyan
- The Idolmaster Shiny Colors (2024) as Kogane Tsukioka
- Hero Without a Class: Who Even Needs Skills?! (2025) as Astea
- Star Detective Precure! (2026) as Shushutan
- Utahime Dream (TBA) as Hikari Mizutsuki

=== Anime films ===
- Colorful Stage! The Movie: A Miku Who Can't Sing (2025) as Saki Tenma

=== Video games ===
- Mahocole ~Mahou☆Idol Collection~ (2014) as Plum Hoshikawa
- Guns Girl Z (2014~) as Tiara Starlumos
- Idol Incidents (2016~2017) as Yukino Miyake
- The Idolmaster Shiny Colors (2018~) as Kogane Tsukioka
- Azur Lane (2018) as Ariake, Lyon
- Kono Subarashii Sekai ni Shukufuku o! Fantastic Days (2020) as Shiero
- Project Sekai: Colorful Stage! feat. Hatsune Miku (2020~) as Saki Tenma
- Assault Lily: Last Bullet (2021~) as Takane Miyagawa
- Umamusume: Pretty Derby (2022~) as Daiichi Ruby

=== Stage play ===
- Hakuoki: Harada Sanosuke Arc (2017) as Chizuru Yukimura
- Bloom Into You (2019) as Sayaka Saeki
  - Also in spin off Bloom Into You: Regarding Sayaka Saeki (2020)
- Brave 10 (2017) as Isanami
- K The Stage 2 -Arousal Of King- (2018) as Anna Kushina
  - Also in sequels K -Lost Small World- (2016) and K -MISSING KINGS- (2017)
- The Rising of the Shield Hero (2021) as Raftalia (Note: Originally 2020; pushed back due to COVID-19 and was first made available through Blu-ray and DVD releases instead.)
- Umamusume: Pretty Derby – Sprinters' Story (2023) as Daiichi Ruby

=== Dubbing ===
- The Last Summoner (2023) as Miaowu

=== Other ===
- Onsen Musume (2019) as Touka Yunohara
