= Comic Earth Star =

Japanese manga magazine

- Categories: Shōnen manga
- Frequency: Monthly
- First issue: 12 March 2011
- Final issue: 12 November 2014
- Company: Earth Star Entertainment
- Country: Japan
- Based in: Tokyo
- Language: Japanese
- Website: Comic Earth Star official website

Comic Earth Star (Japanese: コミック アース・スター, Hepburn: Komikku Āsu Sutā) was a monthly Japanese shōnen manga magazine published on the 12th each month by Earth Star Entertainment since 12 March 2011. The magazine announced in their November 2014 issue that the print version would cease publication, and instead be replaced by a new, all-digital version after the release of the December 2014 issue on 12 November.

== Serialized titles ==
- The 47 Great Wars (transferred to Magazine Pocket)
- Alice Royale
- Ataraxia - Sengoku Tenseiki
- Chotto Matta!! Jisatsu Café
- D.C. III
- Devil Survivor 2 - Show Your Free Will
- Didn't I Say to Make My Abilities Average in the Next Life?! (hiatus)
- Dōnano Kawamoto-san!
- Dracu-Riot! Honey!
- Encouragement of Climb (ongoing)
- Enka to Hanamichi
- The Frontier Lord Begins with Zero Subjects (ongoing)
- I Parry Everything: What Do You Mean I'm the Strongest? I'm Not Even an Adventurer Yet! (ongoing)
- Heart Under the Blade
- Hero Without a Class (ongoing)
- Kai Pilgrim
- Kemonogumi
- Koetama
- Koigoe
- Magical Chef Shōjo Shizuru
- Mahou Shoujo Nante Mouiidesukara (ongoing)
- Majokko Minami-kun no Jijō
- Mangirl!
- Material Brave
- Morenja V
- My Daughter Left the Nest and Returned an S-Rank Adventurer (ongoing)
- My Instant Death Ability Is So Overpowered (ongoing)
- Nadeshikoka.
- Neun Edda
- Nijiiro Septetta
- Nobunagun
- Nya Nya Nya Nya!
- Photo Kano - Memorial Pictures
- Pupa
- Record
- Reincarnated as a Dragon's Egg: Dragon Road of Ibara (ongoing)
- Sekai de Ichiban Tsuyoku Naritai!
- Sengoku Komachi Kurōtan: Nōkō Giga (ongoing)
- Super Sonico SoniKoma
- A Tale of the Secret Saint (ongoing)
- Takamiya Nasuno Desu! (cancelled)
- Teekyu (ongoing)
- Tokyo Jitensha Shōjo.
- Trace (Amematsu)
- Usakame (ongoing)
- Umeko-chan Wa Koishiteru
- Utahime Dream (ongoing)
- Water Cube
- Zansatsu Hantō Akamemura
- Zenryoku Idol!
