= Utahime Dream =

Japanese media franchise

- Cover of the first volume of the manga series

ウタヒメドリーム (Utahime Dorīmu)
- Created by: Earth Star Entertainment
- Manga
- Written by: Earth Star Entertainment
- Illustrated by: Hiyoriri
- Published by: Earth Star Entertainment
- Imprint: Earth Star Comics
- Magazine: Comic Earth Star
- Original run: February 13, 2025 – present
- Volumes: 2
- Manga

Utahime Kafe e Yōkoso!
- Written by: Earth Star Entertainment
- Illustrated by: Takayomi
- Published by: Earth Star Entertainment
- Imprint: Earth Star Comics
- Magazine: Comic Earth Star
- Original run: June 19, 2025 – present
- Volumes: 1
- Anime television series

Utahime Dream (Japanese: ウタヒメドリーム, Hepburn: Utahime Dorīmu; "Song Princess Dream") is a Japanese idol-themed mixed-media project created by Earth Star Entertainment that began in June 2023, consisting of various songs (both originals and covers), singles and events. A manga series with art by Hiyoriri has been serialized online via Earth Star Entertainment's Comic Earth Star website since February 2025. An anime television series has been announced.

== Characters ==
Ibuki Yumesaki (夢咲いぶき, Yumesaki Ibuki)
Voiced by: Rena Yamasaki
Maika Sakuragi (桜木舞華, Sakuragi Maika)
Voiced by: Anna Suzuki
Kiyomi Mashiro (真白清美, Mashiro Kiyomi)
Voiced by: Arisa Sonohara
HiREN
Voiced by: Kaya
Hikari Mizutsuki (水月ひかり, Mizutsuki Hikari)
Voiced by: Karin Isobe
Rin Takagi (高木凛, Takagi Rin)
Voiced by: Tomomi Jiena Sumi
Himawari Hagiwara (萩原ひまわり, Hagiwara Himawari)
Voiced by: Reo Kurachi
Sakurako
Voiced by: Yume Takeuchi

== Other media ==
=== Manga ===
A manga series illustrated by Hiyoriri began serialization on Earth Star Entertainment's Comic Earth Star manga service on February 13, 2025. The manga's chapters have been compiled into two tankōbon volumes as of July 2026.

A four-panel spin-off manga series illustrated by Takayomi, titled Utahime Kafe e Yōkoso! (ウタヒメカフェへようこそ！), began serialization on the same service on June 19, 2025. The manga's chapters have been compiled into a single tankōbon volume as of July 2026.

==== Volumes ====
| No. | Release date | ISBN |
|---|---|---|
| 1 | October 10, 2025 | 978-4-8030-2188-2 |
| 2 | July 10, 2026 | 978-4-8030-2330-5 |

==== Utahime Kafe e Yōkoso! ====
| No. | Release date | ISBN |
|---|---|---|
| 1 | July 10, 2026 | 978-4-8030-2329-9 |

=== Anime ===
An anime television series was announced during an event for the project on February 24, 2025.
