= Earth Star Entertainment =

Japanese publishing company

- Parent company: Culture Convenience Club
- Founded: June 5, 2006
- Country of origin: Japan
- Headquarters location: 〒141-0021 3-1-1 Kamiōsaki, Shinagawa, Tokyo
- Key people: President Kazuhiro Makuuchi
- Publication types: Magazines, photobooks, home video, music CDs
- Revenue: 30 million
- No. of employees: 33 (as of April 1, 2023)
- Official website: www.earthstar.jp

Earth Star Entertainment (Japanese: 株式会社アース・スター エンターテイメント, Hepburn: Kabushiki Gaisha Āsu Sutā Entāteimento) is a Japanese publisher previously based in Shibuya, Tokyo. They have moved to the neighbourhood of Kamiōsaki, Shinagawa, Tokyo. Accounted by the equity method of Culture Convenience Club, it was founded on June 5, 2006. In addition to publishing magazines and photobooks, the company also produces and sells home videos and music. It also deals with management of tarento and publishes the monthly manga magazine Comic Earth Star, and releases the manga under the Earth Star Comics line.

== Publications ==
- Comic Earth Star
- Poly Fukuro Recipe (ポリ袋レシピ, Pori Fukuro Reshipi)
- Kyūkyoku! Zettai Ryōiki!! Collection (究極!絶対領域!!コレクション, Kyūkyoku! Zettai Ryōiki!! Korekushon)
- Prometheus
