= Sweet Diva =

Sweet Diva may refer to:

- Sweet Diva, a fictional Japanese idol group from the manga Wanna Be the Strongest in the World
- Sweet Diva, the international English title of the Brazilian telenovela A Dona do Pedaço
