= Ryōta Ōsaka =

Japanese voice actor

- 逢坂 良太
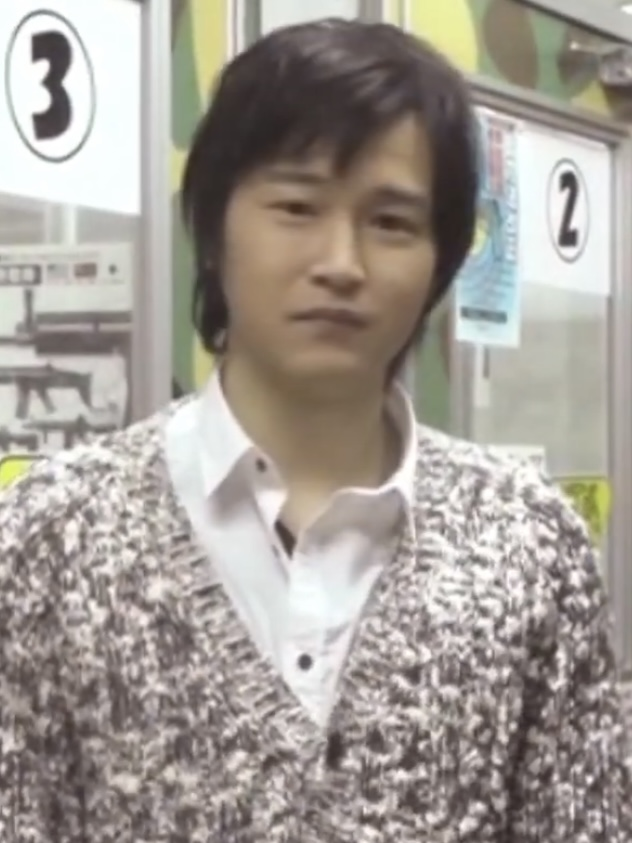
- Ōsaka in 2014
- Born: August 2, 1986 (age 40); Tokushima Prefecture, Japan
- Occupation: Voice actor
- Years active: 2010–present
- Agent: Early Wing
- Notable work: The Devil Is a Part-Timer! as Sadao Maou; Attack on Titan as Marco Bodt; Blood Lad as Staz C. Blood; Ace of Diamond as Eijun Sawamura; Knights of Sidonia as Nagate Tanikaze; Yamada-kun and the Seven Witches as Ryu Yamada; Snow White with the Red Hair as Zen Wistaria; Chivalry of a Failed Knight as Ikki Kurogane; Haikyu!! as Keiji Akaashi; Black Clover as Sekke Bronzazza; We Never Learn as Nariyuki Yuiga; Demon Slayer: Kimetsu no Yaiba as Gyutaro; Love Flops as Asahi Kashiwagi; Wind Breaker as Tasuku Tsubakino
- Height: 176 cm (5 ft 9 in)
- Spouse: Manami Numakura (m. 2019)
- Children: 1

Ryōta Ōsaka (逢坂 良太, Ōsaka Ryōta; born August 2, 1986) is a Japanese voice actor. He is affiliated with Early Wing.

== Biography ==
Ōsaka is the middle child of three siblings. He played on a baseball team in elementary school and on the softball team as pitcher in secondary school. He was involved with anime while attending junior high school, but had no particular dream on acting before entering high school. After graduating from a local technical high school, Ōsaka moved to Tokyo with a friend who also wanted to be a voice actor, and studied the basics of acting for two years at Nippon Kogakuin Hachioji College. After graduating, Ōsaka attended a voice actor training school, passed the additional audition for the agency Early Wing, and made his debut in 2010.

In April 2012, Ōsaka voiced Yuki Sanada in Tsuritama. Yukio Nagasaki, who saw his performance at the audition, said he thought that he could become the face of "a new generation of male voice actors in main roles". Nagasaki's support won Ōsaka the role. At the first post-recording, he was nervous and was encouraged by his co-star Tomokazu Sugita, who told him, "We will work, so you can concentrate." He received Best Male Newcomer at the 9th Seiyu Awards in 2015. He also hosts the radio show ŌHana (逢坂市立花江学園, Ōsaka Shiritsu Hanae Gakuen) along with voice actor Natsuki Hanae. Ōsaka announced his marriage to fellow voice actress Manami Numakura on October 23, 2019. Numakura gave birth to their first child, a boy, on December 19, 2021.

=== Feature ===
- Kenji Nakamura, director of Tsuritama, said, "There is no sarcasm when you listen to him, or rather, he has a clear and colorless voice, like water, which is suitable for a leading role" and Nippon Broadcasting System announcer Naoki Yoshida said, "The main character can grow correctly without being deliberate". His best role is that of "a cheerful boy in high school".
- He says that wanting to be like Rid Herschel from Tales of Eternia, played by Akira Ishida, is what inspired him to become a voice actor, and he considers Ishida to be his target voice actor. Among the roles played by Ishida, he especially likes characters like Rid and Athrun Zala from Mobile Suit Gundam SEED, who seem to be the main characters.
- He says that he loves to sing, and he also does singing work. She also loves to sing, and does some singing as well.She is also very active in interacting with her fans, saying that receiving their voices at events helps her in her work.

== Filmography ==
=== Anime ===
2011

- Kimi to Boku – Palmo
- Mashiroiro Symphony – Koichi Mizuhara

2012

- Medaka Box Abnormal – Hyakucho Hayama
- Muv-Luv Alternative – Total Eclipse – Kil Efremov
- My Little Monster – Sōhei Sasahara
- OniAi – Akito Himenokōji
- Sket Dance – Kiri Kato
- Sword Art Online – "Red-Eyed" XaXa (Laughing Coffin member)
- Tsuritama – Yuki Sanada

2013

- Ace of Diamond – Eijun Sawamura
- Attack on Titan – Marco Bodt
- Beast Saga – Kannigaroo
- Blood Lad – Staz Charlie Blood
- Chihayafuru 2 – Tashiro (Ep. 4, 6), Masaki Ono (Ep. 9, 14)
- Danbōru Senki Wars – Arata Sena
- Gatchaman Crowds – Sugane Tachibana
- Gingitsune – Youta Fujimura
- Haganai Next – Toma Suzutsuki
- High School DxD New – Vali Lucifer
- JoJo's Bizarre Adventure – Mark
- Log Horizon – Shōryū
- Magi: The Kingdom of Magic – Sphintus Carmen
- Nagi-Asu: A Lull in the Sea – Kaname Isaki
- Oreshura – Eita Kidō
- Rozen Maiden: Zurückspulen – Jun Sakurada
- Strike the Blood – Motoki Yaze
- Super Seisyun Brothers – Chika Shinmoto
- Yondemasuyo, Azazel-san Z – Gagiel Amano
- Teekyu 3 – Yōta Oshimoto
- The Devil Is a Part-Timer! – Sadao Maou/Satan Jacob
- Valvrave the Liberator – Haruto Tokishima

2014

- Argevollen – Tokimune Susumu
- Brynhildr in the Darkness – Ryōta Murakami
- Dai-Shogun - Great Revolution – Sutemaru
- Denkigai no Honya-san – Umio
- Glasslip – Kakeru Okikura
- Gundam Reconguista in G – Klim Nick
- Hamatora – Nice
- Hero Bank – Ryōma Ishin
- Hunter × Hunter (2011) – Kanzai
- If Her Flag Breaks – Sōta Hatate
- Knights of Sidonia – Nagate Tanikaze
- Log Horizon 2nd Season – Shōryū
- Re: Hamatora – Nice
- Shōnen Hollywood -Holly Stage for 49- – Kakeru Kazama
- Sugar Soldier – Shun Iriya
- Sword Art Online II – Shouichi Shinkawa
- Tales of Zestiria: Doushi no Yoake – Mikleo
- Your Lie in April – Ryota Watari

2015

- Ace of Diamond: Second Season – Eijun Sawamura
- Assassination Classroom – Yūma Isogai
- Attack on Titan: Junior High – Marco Bodt
- Aldnoah.Zero 2nd Season – Klancain
- Charlotte – Shō (Ep. 3)
- Gatchaman Crowds insight – Sugane Tachibana
- Haikyū!! 2 – Keiji Akaashi
- High School DxD BorN – Vali Lucifer
- Knights of Sidonia: War of the Ninth Planet – Nagate Tanikaze
- Kuroko's Basketball 3 – Chihiro Mayuzumi
- Mini Hama: Minimum Hamatora – Nice
- Miss Monochrome: The Animation 3 – Sobasshi
- Rakudai Kishi no Cavalry – Ikki Kurogane
- Shōnen Hollywood -Holly Stage for 50- – Kakeru Kazama
- Show by Rock!! – Kai
- Snow White with the Red Hair – Zen Wistalia
- Takamiya Nasuno Desu! – Yōta Oshimoto
- Teekyu 4 – Yōta Oshimoto
- Teekyu 6 – Yōta Oshimoto
- Ushio and Tora – Satoru Moritsuna
- Yamada-kun and the Seven Witches – Ryū Yamada

2016

- Ajin: Demi-Human – Keisuke Nakajima
- All Out!! – Mutsumi Hachiōji
- Aokana: Four Rhythm Across the Blue – Masaya Hinata
- Assassination Classroom Second Season – Yūma Isogai
- Days – Atomu Isurugi
- Kabaneri of the Iron Fortress – Sukari
- The Lost Village – Reiji
- Mobile Suit Gundam: Iron-Blooded Orphans – Hash Midi
- Monster Hunter Stories: Ride On – Cheval
- Prince of Stride: Alternative – Hajime Izumino
- Show by Rock!!♯ – Kai
- Show By Rock!! Short!! – Kai
- Snow White with the Red Hair 2 – Zen Wistalia
- Tales of Zestiria the X – Mikleo
- Taboo Tattoo – Varma
- Teekyu 7 – Yōta Oshimoto
- Touken Ranbu: Hanamaru – Shishiou
- Trickster – Kensuke Hanasaki
- Undefeated Bahamut Chronicle – Fugil Arcadia

2017

- Black Clover – Sekke Bronzazza
- Classroom of the Elite – Yosuke Hirata
- Dive!! – Ryō Ohira
- Kabukibu! – Shin Akutsu
- Love and Lies – Yukari Nejima
- Mahōjin Guru Guru – Vivian (Ep. 19, 21 - )
- NTR: Netsuzou Trap – Takeda
- Sengoku Night Blood – Hanbee Takenaka
- Tales of Zestiria the X Season 2 – Mikleo
- UQ Holder! Magister Negi Magi! 2 – Xingzi Chao

2018

- Devils' Line – Naoya Ushio
- Gundam Build Divers – Shahryar
- Hakata Tonkotsu Ramens – Yusuke Harada
- Hakyu Hoshin Engi – Ouma
- High School DxD Hero – Vali Lucifer
- Nil Admirari no Tenbin: Teito Genwaku Kitan – Hisui Hoshikawa
- Overlord II – Climb
- Shinkansen Henkei Robo Shinkalion the Animation – Ryūji Kiyosu
- Ulysses: Jeanne d'Arc and the Alchemist Knight – Montmorency
- Zoku Touken Ranbu: Hanamaru – Shishiou

2019

- Ace of Diamond Act II – Eijun Sawamura
- A Certain Scientific Accelerator – Mikihiko Hishigata
- Ensemble Stars! – Ibara Saegusa
- Girly Air Force – Kei Narutani
- Grimms Notes The Animation – Ekusu
- Is It Wrong to Try to Pick Up Girls in a Dungeon? II – Apollo
- Star-Myu: High School Star Musical 3 – Masashi Irinatsu
- The Ones Within – Ken Kudou
- We Never Learn – Nariyuki Yuiga

2020

- Haikyū!! To The Top – Keiji Akaashi
- Interspecies Reviewers – Incubus
- The Misfit of Demon King Academy – Kanon
- Yu-Gi-Oh! Sevens – Arata Arai

2021

- Farewell, My Dear Cramer – Kaoru Takei
- Fena: Pirate Princess – Kaede
- Heaven's Design Team – Yokota
- Higehiro – Kyouya Yaguchi
- Show by Rock!! Stars!! – Kai
- So I'm a Spider, So What? – Wrath
- The Hidden Dungeon Only I Can Enter – Noir Stardia
- Tokyo Revengers – Naoto Tachibana

2022

- Classroom of the Elite 2nd Season – Yosuke Hirata
- Demon Slayer: Kimetsu no Yaiba – Entertainment District Arc – Gyutaro
- Engage Kiss – Mihail Hachisuka
- Love Flops – Asahi Kashiwagi
- Salaryman's Club – Tōya Saeki
- Shinobi no Ittoki – Ittoki Sakuraba
- The Devil Is a Part-Timer!! – Sadao Maou/Sadao Maō

2023

- Berserk of Gluttony – Fate Graphite
- Chronicles of an Aristocrat Reborn in Another World – Yuuya Terra Hirasawa Esfort
- Endo and Kobayashi Live! The Latest on Tsundere Villainess Lieselotte – Artur Richter
- MF Ghost – Kōki Sawatari
- Opus Colors – Kyo Takise
- The Saint's Magic Power Is Omnipotent 2nd Season – Oscar Dunkel
- The Tale of the Outcasts – Snow

2024

- A Condition Called Love – Keigo Kurata
- A Sign of Affection – Kyōya Nagi
- A Terrified Teacher at Ghoul School! – Haruaki Abe
- Classroom of the Elite 3rd Season – Yosuke Hirata
- Go! Go! Loser Ranger! – Yamato Kurusu
- I'll Become a Villainess Who Goes Down in History – Albert Williams
- Magilumiere Magical Girls Inc. – Midorikawa
- The Banished Former Hero Lives as He Pleases – Brett
- The Witch and the Beast – Johan
- Too Many Losing Heroines! – Sōsuke Hakamada

2025

- A Star Brighter Than the Sun – Yūshin Izawa
- Aquarion: Myth of Emotions – Sukuna
- From Old Country Bumpkin to Master Swordsman – Spur
- Rurouni Kenshin: Kyoto Disturbance – Kariwa Henya
- Wind Breaker Season 2 – Tasuku Tsubakino

2026

- Ace of Diamond Act II season 2 - Eijun Sawamura
- Jujutsu Kaisen – Iori Hazenoki
- Daemons of the Shadow Realm - Danji
- Even Though I'm a Super Timid Noble Girl, I Accepted the Bet from My Cunning Fiancé – Rufus Stan

=== Theatrical animation ===
- Ao Oni: The Animation (2017) as Kōji Manabe
- Knights of Sidonia: Love Woven in the Stars (2021) as Nagate Tanikaze
- Farewell, My Dear Cramer: First Touch (2021) as Kaoru Takei
- Black Clover: Sword of the Wizard King (2023) as Sekke Bronzazza

=== Web animation ===
- Mobile Suit Gundam Thunderbolt – Billy Hickham
- Koro-sensei Q! – Yūma Isogai
- Powerful Pro Yakyū Powerful Kōkō-hen – Subaru Hoshii

=== Original video animation (OVA) ===
- Rescue Me! – Masayuki Mizutani
- Nijiiro Prism Girl – Touya Ichinose
- Yamada-kun and the Seven Witches – Ryū Yamada
- Oresuki: Oretachi no Game Set – Tatsuo Shiba
- Mushoku Tensei: Jobless Reincarnation (Eris no Goblin Tōbatsu) – Cliff
- Code Geass: Rozé of the Recapture – Heath

=== Drama CD ===
- Like a Butterfly – Taiichi Kawasumi
- KonoSuba - Kazuma Sato

=== Multimedia projects ===
- Aoppella!? - Tanba Rin

=== Video games ===
- Akane-sasu Sekai de Kimi to Utau – Saitō Hajime
- Akiba's Trip 2 – Protagonist (Nanashi)
- Dengeki Bunko: Fighting Climax – Sadao Maō
- Fairy Fencer F – Fang
- Extraordinary Ones - Cicada
- La storia della Arcana Famiglia 2 – Teo
- Tales of Zestiria – Mikleo
- Granblue Fantasy – Percival
- Yumeiro Cast – Kyōya Asahina
- Ensemble Stars! – Ibara Saegusa
- BlackStar: Theater Starless – Sinju
- Closers (2017) – Haruto
- Love Scramble – Ota Kisaki
- Our World is Ended – Reiji Gozen
- Pokémon Masters – Blue
- Monster Hunter Stories – Cheval
- World Flipper – Yuell
- Captain Tsubasa: Dream Team – Fei Xiang
- Identity V - Lawyer/Freddy Riley
- Genshin Impact – Bennett
- Last Cloudia - Zekus
- Samurai Warriors 5 - Ieyasu Tokugawa
- Cookie Run – Adventurer Cookie
- Soul Hackers 2 - Kaburagi
- Fairy Fencer F: Refrain Chord – Fang
- Arknights – Ebenholz
- Xenoblade Chronicles 3 – Zeon
- The Adventures of Elliot: The Millennium Tales – Elliot

=== Dubbing ===
==== Live-action ====
- Ender's Game – Andrew "Ender" Wiggin (Asa Butterfield)
- Gran Turismo – Antonio Cruz (Pepe Barroso)
- The Merciless – Hyun-soo (Yim Si-wan)

==== Animation ====
- Miraculous: Tales of Ladybug & Cat Noir – Adrien Agreste/Cat Noir
- The Summit of the Gods – Buntaro Kishi
