= I Got a Cheat Skill in Another World and Became Unrivaled in the Real World, Too =

Japanese light novel series and its adaptations

- First light novel volume cover, featuring Kaori Hōjō (left), Yūya Tenjō (center), and Lexia Von Arselia (right)

異世界でチート能力(スキル)を手にした俺は、現実世界をも無双する〜レベルアップは人生を変えた〜 (Isekai de Chīto Sukiru o Te ni Shita Ore wa, Genjitsu Sekai o mo Musō Suru: Reberu Appu wa Jinsei o Kaeta)
- Genre: Isekai
- Novel series
- Written by: Miku
- Published by: Kakuyomu
- Original run: March 25, 2017 – present
- Light novel
- Written by: Miku
- Illustrated by: Rein Kuwashima
- Published by: Fujimi Shobo
- English publisher: NA: Yen Press
- Imprint: Fujimi Fantasia Bunko
- Original run: December 20, 2018 – present
- Volumes: 21
- Manga
- Written by: Miku
- Illustrated by: Kazuomi Minatogawa
- Published by: ASCII Media Works
- English publisher: NA: Yen Press
- Imprint: Dengeki Comics Next
- Magazine: Dengeki PlayStation Comic Web
- Original run: December 13, 2019 – present
- Volumes: 7
- Light novel

I Got a Cheat Skill in Another World and Became Unrivaled in the Real World, Too: Girls Side
- Written by: Ryō Kotohira
- Illustrated by: Rein Kuwashima
- Published by: Fujimi Shobo
- Imprint: Fujimi Fantasia Bunko
- Original run: December 20, 2022 – present
- Volumes: 5
- Light novel

I Got a Cheat Skill in Another World and Became Unrivaled in the Real World, Too: The Story of Kaori Hōjō
- Written by: Ryō Kotohira
- Illustrated by: Rein Kuwashima
- Published by: Fujimi Shobo
- Imprint: Fujimi Fantasia Bunko
- Original run: February 20, 2025 – present
- Volumes: 2
- Anime television series
- Directed by: Shin Itagaki (Note: Credited as Chief Director (総監督, Sō Kantoku) for the first season); Shingo Tanabe (S1)
- Produced by: Takuma Kishida; Satoshi Motonaga
- Written by: Shin Itagaki
- Music by: Akiyuki Tateyama; Shiki (S2)
- Studio: Millepensee (animation); TMS Entertainment (production and planning) (Note: Produced under the Unlimited Produced by TMS banner)
- Licensed by: Crunchyroll (streaming); SA/SEA: Muse Communication
- Original network: Tokyo MX, SUN, KBS Kyoto, BS11
- Original run: April 7, 2023 – present
- Episodes: 13
- Manga

I Got a Cheat Skill in Another World and Became Unrivaled in the Real World, Too: Girls Side
- Written by: Ryō Kotohira
- Illustrated by: Miinosuke Seo
- Published by: ASCII Media Works
- Imprint: Dengeki Comics Next
- Magazine: KadoComi; Nico Nico Manga
- Original run: April 25, 2024 – present
- Volumes: 3
- Anime television film
- Directed by: Shin Itagaki
- Produced by: Takuma Kishida; Satoshi Motonaga
- Written by: Shin Itagaki
- Music by: Akiyuki Tateyama
- Studio: Millepensee (animation); TMS Entertainment (production and planning)
- Licensed by: SA/SEA: Muse Communication
- Original network: Tokyo MX, SUN, KBS Kyoto, BS11
- Released: March 31, 2026
- Runtime: 47 minutes
- icon

I Got a Cheat Skill in Another World and Became Unrivaled in the Real World, Too, (Note: Japanese: 異世界でチート能力(スキル)を手にした俺は、現実世界をも無双する〜レベルアップは人生を変えた〜, Hepburn: Isekai de Chīto Sukiru o Te ni Shita Ore wa, Genjitsu Sekai o mo Musō Suru: Reberu Appu wa Jinsei o Kaeta) shortened to Iseleve (いせれべ, Iserebe), is a Japanese light novel series written by Miku and illustrated by Rein Kuwashima. It began as a web novel that started in the Kakuyomu website in March 2017. It was later acquired by Fujimi Shobo, who have published the series since December 2018 under their Fujimi Fantasia Bunko imprint.

A manga adaptation illustrated by Kazuomi Minatogawa has been serialized on ASCII Media Works' Dengeki PlayStation Comic Web website since December 2019, with its chapters collected into seven tankōbon volumes as of December 2025. An anime television series adaptation produced by TMS Entertainment and animated by Millepensee aired from April to June 2023. An anime television special aired in March 2026. A second season is set to premiere in January 2027.

== Plot ==
Yūya Tenjō is an overweight, short and meek middle school student who is bullied at school and tormented by his family, except for his grandfather, who is the only person who cares for him. When his grandfather dies and leaves Yūya as the sole heir of his house, his parents expel him from home, and he is forced to live there alone. Inside his grandfather's house, Yūya discovers a portal to another world named Argena, where he obtains power that will change his life forever as it leads him into battle against multiple powerful malevolent entities, demons, extraterrestrials, and even gods, sometimes for the sake of the very fabric of existence itself, in the past, present and future.

== Media ==
=== Light novels ===
Written by Miku, the series began publication online in the Kakuyomu website on March 25, 2017, under the tentative title Level Up wa Jinsei o Kaeta (レベルアップは人生を変えた; lit. 'Level Up Changed My Life'). The series was later acquired by Fujimi Shobo, which began publishing the novels with illustrations by Rein Kuwashima starting on December 20, 2018, under its Fujimi Fantasia Bunko imprint. As of September 2026, twenty-one volumes have been released.

In September 2021, Yen Press announced that they had licensed the novels for English publication.

A spin-off series titled I Got a Cheat Skill in Another World and Became Unrivaled in the Real World, Too: Girls Side (異世界でチート能力を手にした俺は、現実世界をも無双する ガールズサイド ～華麗なる乙女たちの冒険は世界を変えた～), written by Ryō Kotohira and illustrated by Kuwashima, began publication under the Fantasia Bunko imprint on December 20, 2022. As of May 2024, five volumes have been released. Its plot deals with Princess Lexia's impulsive decision to engage in a "learning journey" throughout her world in order to become Yūya's equal, and she ends up gathering her own experiences to help her grow into her own.

On February 20, 2025, another spin-off story was released. Titled I Got a Cheat Skill in Another World and Became Unrivaled in the Real World, Too: The Story of Kaori Hōjō ~ The Ignorant Young Lady Saved the World Behind the Scenes (異世界でチート能力を手にした俺は、現実世界をも無双する 宝城佳織伝 ～常識知らずなお嬢様は陰で世界を救っていた～), and also written by Kotohira and illustrated by Kuwashima, its plot details Kaori Hōjō encountering a magical girl named Noah and discovering her own magical power hidden within herself in the course of her adventures with her. A sequel volume was released in July, 2025.

==== Main series ====
No.	Original release date	Original ISBN	English release date	English ISBN
1	December 20, 2018	978-4-04-073023-3	May 17, 2022	978-1-9753-3393-5
2	April 20, 2019	978-4-04-073024-0	April 18, 2023	978-1-9753-3395-9
3	August 20, 2019	978-4-04-073304-3	August 22, 2023	978-1-9753-3397-3
4	December 20, 2019	978-4-04-073305-0	December 12, 2023	978-1-9753-3399-7
5	April 17, 2020	978-4-04-073632-7	June 18, 2024	978-1-9753-3401-7
6	August 20, 2020	978-4-04-073633-4	October 29, 2024	978-1-9753-3403-1
7	December 19, 2020	978-4-04-073917-5	December 2, 2025	979-8-8554-0701-3
8	May 20, 2021	978-4-04-073918-2	September 22, 2026	979-8-8554-1581-0
9	October 20, 2021	978-4-04-074248-9	—	—
10	March 19, 2022	978-4-04-074249-6	—	—
11	August 20, 2022	978-4-04-074576-3	—	—
12	December 20, 2022	978-4-04-074577-0	—	—
13	March 17, 2023	978-4-04-074920-4	—	—
14	June 20, 2023	978-4-04-075016-3	—	—
15	February 20, 2024	978-4-04-075300-3	—	—
16	July 20, 2024	978-4-04-075497-0	—	—
17	December 20, 2024	978-4-04-075729-2	—	—
18	May 20, 2025	978-4-04-075888-6	—	—
19	October 18, 2025	978-4-04-076127-5	—	—
20	March 19, 2026	978-4-04-076324-8	—	—
21	September 18, 2026	978-4-04-076562-4	—	—

==== Spin-offs ====
Girls Side

No.	Release date	ISBN
1	December 20, 2022	978-4-04-074769-9
2	March 17, 2023	978-4-04-074921-1
3	September 20, 2023	978-4-04-075055-2
4	January 19, 2024	978-4-04-075301-0
5	May 17, 2024	978-4-04-075449-9

The Story of Kaori Hōjō

No.	Release date	ISBN
1	February 20, 2025	978-4-04-075779-7
2	July 18, 2025	978-4-04-075974-6

=== Manga ===
A manga adaptation illustrated by Kazuomi Minatogawa began serialization on ASCII Media Works' Dengeki PlayStation Comic Web website on December 13, 2019. As of December 2025, seven tankōbon volumes have been released. Yen Press has also licensed the manga in English.

A manga adaptation of the spin-off series Girls Side, illustrated by Miinosuke Seo, began serialization on the KadoComi and Nico Nico Manga websites on April 25, 2024. As of January 2026, three tankōbon volumes has been released.

==== Main series ====
No.	Original release date	Original ISBN	English release date	English ISBN
1	August 26, 2020	978-4-04-913364-6	May 24, 2022	978-1-9753-3391-1
2	May 27, 2021	978-4-04-913819-1	January 17, 2023	978-1-9753-4288-3
3	March 10, 2022	978-4-04-914299-0	April 18, 2023	978-1-9753-5275-2
4	December 26, 2022	978-4-04-914778-0	December 12, 2023	978-1-9753-7656-7
5	August 25, 2023	978-4-04-915225-8	August 20, 2024	978-1-9753-9282-6
6	July 26, 2024	978-4-04-915823-6	November 25, 2025	979-8-8554-1903-0
7	December 27, 2025	978-4-04-916559-3	February 23, 2027	979-8-8554-4964-8
8	December 24, 2026	978-4-04-952578-6	—	—

==== Spin-offs ====
Girls Side

No.	Release date	ISBN
1	November 27, 2024	978-4-04-916076-5
2	June 27, 2025	978-4-04-916453-4
3	January 27, 2026	978-4-04-916873-0

=== Anime ===
In August 2022, an anime television series adaptation was announced. It is produced by TMS Entertainment and animated by Millepensee, with Shingo Tanabe directing, Shin Itagaki serving as chief director and supervising the scripts, Hiromi Kimura adapting Rein Kuwashima's character designs for animation and serving as chief animation director, and Akiyuki Tateyama composing the music. The series aired from April 7 to June 30, 2023, on Tokyo MX and other networks. (Note: Tokyo MX listed the series premiere on April 6 at 24:30, which is effectively April 7 at 12:30 a.m. JST.) The opening theme song is "Gyakuten Geki" (逆転劇; "Turnabout Drama"), performed by Tsukuyomi, while the ending theme song is "Hachimitsu" (ハチミツ; lit. 'Honey'), performed by Shikao Suga. Crunchyroll is streaming the series along with an English dub. Muse Communication licensed the series in Asia-Pacific. The initial streaming of the series' 13th and final episode was inexplicably delayed by two days from the original June 26, 2023, release date, which ended up airing on June 28 instead.

A new anime project was announced during the "Fantasia Bunko Daikanshasai Online 2023" livestream on October 14, 2023, which was later revealed to be a television special, with Itagaki serving as director and Kimura returning as character designer. It premiered on March 31, 2026. (Note: Tokyo MX listed the TV special on March 30 at 24:00, which is effectively March 31 at midnight JST.)

A second season was announced at AnimeJapan on March 28, 2026. It will be directed by Itagaki, with Kimura designing the characters and Tateyama composing the music with Shiki. The season is set to premiere in January 2027.

==== Episodes ====
No.	Title	Directed by	Written by	Storyboarded by	Original release date (Note: Episodes are released on ABEMA and Crunchyroll 3 days before their air dates on television.)
1	"To Another World"; Transliteration: "Isekai e" (Japanese: 異世界へ)	Shingo Tanabe	Shin Itagaki	Shingo Tanabe	April 7, 2023
Middle school student Yūya Tenjō has been bullied since childhood due to his obesity, even by his own parents, who prefer his more attractive brother and sister. Yūya lives alone in a house he inherited from his grandfather, the only one to treat Yūya kindly. One day he saves a girl, Kaori Hōjō, from thugs but is badly beaten in the process. Later, he discovers a secret portal to a cottage in another world that operates like a video game. The cottage comes supplied with powerful weapons, and while experimenting with his skills, a powerful monster appears outside the cottage's magic barrier. From inside the barrier, Yūya kills the monster and immediately gains 100 levels, evolving his body and making him tall, muscular, and handsome. Using a skill to trade items for Japanese currency, he buys new clothes before returning to Japan for his first day of high school. His former bullies are stunned by his transformation, but his jealous siblings continue to bully him. They are interrupted by the arrival of Kaori, who somehow knows who he is.
2	"Ōsei Academy"; Transliteration: "Ōsei Gakuen" (Japanese: 王星学園)	Kazuki Sawada	Yūichirō Takeda	Shingo Tanabe	April 14, 2023
Due to him saving her, Kaori's father, chairman of the elite Ōsei Academy, offers Yūya a place at Ōsei. His siblings attempt to push Yūya aside, claiming they are better suited to Ōsei, but having investigated them, Kaori rejects them as spiteful bullies. Yūya leaves with Kaori, leaving his siblings humiliated and furious. He worries about fitting in, but the chairman assures him Ōsei values strength of character over grades, making it easier to hone skills and have fun. As a trial, Yūya attends a science class run by Ms. Sawada, where most female students are smitten with his good looks. Yūya becomes tentative friends with Ryō and Shingo and is overwhelmed by people treating him with actual kindness, so he agrees to transfer to Ōsei. Kaori shows him the nearby shopping center and insists they use each other's first names while sharing snacks. Many eavesdropping students assume they are on a date, embarrassing Yūya. He decides to return to the other world for fun, but this time encounters a girl named Lexia, whom he rescues from a monster. Unsure what to do, he sneaks away unseen once her guards arrive.
3	"Life Changes"; Transliteration: "Jinsei no Henka" (Japanese: 人生の変化)	Yukina Hiiro	Yukina Hiiro	Yukina Hiiro	April 21, 2023
Yūya decides to spend some of his new wealth on clothes. While shopping, he is grabbed by a photographer named Hikaru as a replacement for male celebrity model Shō and takes part in a photoshoot with professional model Miu, who is drawn to Yūya's inexperience and charm. Shō abruptly shows up late and forcefully flirts with Miu. When Yūya intervenes, Shō tries to punch him, only for Yūya to instinctively defeat him. Due to the cameras still recording, Shō is exposed online as a scumbag, destroying his career. Despite enjoying himself, Yūya declines Hikaru's offer of a modeling contract to focus on his studies, but Hikaru insists on paying him with free designer clothing. In the other world, Princess Lexia of Arselia is determined to thank her anonymous hero and stubbornly returns to the dangerous forest with her guards to find him. Yūya visits the other world and finds Lexia and her guards under attack again, so he rescues them, and Lexia abruptly asks Yūya to marry her. In Japan, Miu's boss is determined to hire Yūya before other modeling agencies get to him.
4	"A Step of Courage"; Transliteration: "Yūki no Ippo" (Japanese: 勇気の一歩)	Kiyotaka Suzuki & Yūki Ōshima	Fuji Sasa	Shin Itagaki	April 28, 2023
After Lexia's sudden proposal, proper introductions are made, and Yūya receives an invitation for an audience with her father, the king of Arselia. However, Reigar, Arselia's first prince, is most displeased that an assassination attempt against his half-sister Lexia under his orders was foiled just before Yūya rescued her. On Earth, Yūya begins his life at Ōsei Academy, where he quickly makes new friends and impresses them by spectacularly rescuing Kaede Kazama from a stray soccer shot. Later, the Red Ogre gang, commanded by his jealous twin siblings, attacks Ōsei to take revenge on Kaori. Though momentarily paralyzed by his self-doubts, Yūya gathers his courage and single-handedly takes down the entire gang. When the police arrive and arrest the gang, the Red Ogres leader tries to kill Yōta and Sora for getting them into this mess, but Yūya rescues his siblings, leaving them deeply ashamed of their past mistreatment of him.
5	"New Family"; Transliteration: "Atarashii Kazoku" (Japanese: 新しい家族)	Shingo Tanabe	Shin Itagaki	Shingo Tanabe	May 5, 2023
On another expedition in the other world's monster forest, Yūya encounters and rescues a Black Fenrir puppy, whom he adopts as a pet and names "Night". As he takes Night for walks in his neighborhood on Earth, Yūya inadvertently draws even more positive attention to himself and also meets Kaori and Miu by chance. After Night proves more capable than his appearance suggests, he accompanies Yūya on his monster-slaying exploits, during one of which they slay a Crystal Deer, which wields both fire and water magic. A drop item it leaves behind after getting killed bestows Yūya with an instant hot bath whenever he needs it. On another trip, they discover a cave containing a man's skeletal remains and a tome labeled "The Book of the Sage." In the meantime, an infamous assassin named Headhunter is hired by Reigar's agents to kill Princess Lexia.
6	"The Sage and Magic"; Transliteration: "Kenja to Mahō" (Japanese: 賢者と魔法)	Tomohiro Yoshida	Kazuyuki Fudeyasu	Tomohiro Yoshida	May 12, 2023
The book is the journal of the Sage, the original owner of Yūya's cottage, who mastered every known skill and was invited to become a god, but declined in favor of retaining his humanity. The book warns Yūya to cultivate friends who will never fear him, no matter how strong he becomes. Responding to Yūya's desires, the book grants him the Sage's magical power and teaches Yūya and Night everything about using magic. At Ōsei, the students are invited on a two-day camping trip. Yūya's group includes Kaede, Akira, and Rin. Yūya's friends, including Kaori, take him shopping for camping gear. The girls are separated from the boys and trapped by a fire, but Yūya uses magic to rescue them. In Arselia, King Arnold learns of Lexia's proposal to Yūya and concludes that Yūya must have seduced her. Additionally, a girl with a dark aura confronts the Divine Rabbit, God of Kicks, and announces she will destroy the world.
7	"An Encounter in the Woods"; Transliteration: "Mori no Naka no Deai" (Japanese: 森の中の出会い)	Kazuki Sawada & Shingo Tanabe	Yūichirō Takeda	Shingo Tanabe	May 19, 2023
While continuing to explore the forest, Yūya and Night encounter a girl being menaced by a group of goblins. Despite Night strangely trying to keep him away from her, Yūya saves the stranger. The girl introduces herself as Luna, claiming she came into the forest for training. After Yūya treats her with a kindness she never experienced before, she falls for him and asks him to help her improve, which he readily agrees to. Sometime later, Yūya is forced to take a break from their team-up in favor of his field trip to a mountainous piece of land owned by Ōsei Academy. To the students' bafflement, they must spend this weekend sleeping outdoors and foraging for food. Yūya once again impresses his fellow students by hand-catching fish for dinner. In the other world, however, Luna is revealed to be Headhunter.
8	"Off-Campus Study Trip"; Transliteration: "Kōgai Gakushū" (Japanese: 校外学習)	Chinatsu Hasegawa	Chinatsu Hasegawa	Chinatsu Hasegawa	May 26, 2023
After returning to camp, and as the only one of his team with cooking skills, Yūya turns the foraged ingredients into a delicious meal, causing Ms. Sawada to promptly propose to him, much to the perturbation of Yūya's female admirers. The next day, a wild bear strays into the camping area. When Ms. Sawada is attacked, Yūya subdues the beast bare-handedly, and the academy administration decides to keep it around as a guard animal. On the day he is scheduled to meet Lexia's father, Yūya thwarts Luna's attack on the Princess and knocks her out. Unable to believe she is evil, and curious about her reasons, Yūya, spontaneously joined by Lexia, teleports them all to the Sage's hut to treat Luna's injuries.
9	"The Princess and the Assassin"; Transliteration: "Ōjo to Ansatsusha" (Japanese: 王女と暗殺者)	Shingo Tanabe	Shingo Tanabe	Shingo Tanabe	June 2, 2023
After learning about Yūya's relationship with her, Lexia questions Luna, who reveals her life's story before she became an assassin for the Guild of Darkness, and her latest mission is to kill Lexia. Expecting to be executed, Luna is surprised when Yūya and Lexia extend their friendship to her. The Princess appoints Luna as her bodyguard, and both ladies declare their affection for Yūya to each other. After spending the night in the hut, Yūya escorts the two ladies to the edge of the forest, where he parts ways with them since he has school the next day. Afterward, Yūya and Night are joined by a little scarlet boar, whom Yūya names "Akatsuki." Back on Earth, Yūya participates in a soccer trial competition for the upcoming academy's ball sport games, where he continues to stand out even as a goalie. The same afternoon, Miu's boss tracks him down at Ōsei.
10	"Master and Apprentice"; Transliteration: "Shishō to Deshi" (Japanese: 師匠と弟子)	Kazuki Sawada & Shingo Tanabe	Shin Itagaki & Yukina Hiiro	Shingo Tanabe & Yukina Hiiro	June 9, 2023
Miu's fashion magazine manager approaches Yūya as he leaves school, only to be refused. Still, when she learns of the impending sports competition, she decides to take pictures of Yūya participating in the event. While on another monster-hunting expedition deeper within the Demon's Den, Yūya is aided by the Divine Rabbit, who has been observing his progress and has chosen him to be his successor as the bearer of the Divine Kick. After hearing about the equilibrium maintained between two groups of advanced beings, the benevolent Divines (of which the Rabbit is a member) and the destructive Viles, Yūya agrees to get trained to protect his friends in both worlds. When the sports competition begins, Yūya ends up wrecking the table tennis and volleyball disciplines, but succeeds in helping Kaori in her tennis match, prompting Kaori to kiss him on the cheek. When next facing his Vile opponent, the Rabbit surprises her with the magic Yūya taught him as recompense for the training, whereupon she decides to target Yūya for elimination first.
11	"To the Royal Capital"; Transliteration: "Iza Ōto e" (Japanese: いざ王都へ)	Yasunori Gotō	Kazuyuki Fudeyasu	Shingo Tanabe	June 16, 2023
Yūya and Kaori begin spending more time together as they prepare for their midterm exams. While in Yūya's home, Kaori accidentally discovers the gate to the other world; Yūya divulges his secret to Kaori, and she promises to keep it. In the capital of Arselia, Lexia introduces Luna to her father, and as the circumstances for Luna's conversion are explained, King Arnold grows even more enraged at Yūya's "indecencies" against his daughter. Upon hearing this news, Reigar decides to accelerate his plans to assassinate his father and Lexia and claim the throne. After gaining a holiday following the competition, Yūya goes to the royal palace to meet the king, but his awkwardness worsens the king's bad impression of him even more. Reigar's agents attack with a magic-suppressing barrier, but Yūya handily defeats the assailants. Lexia chides her father for his temper, and proof of Reigar's involvement is discovered.
12	"The Mysterious Assailant"; Transliteration: "Nazo no Shūgekisha" (Japanese: 謎の襲撃者)	Kazuki Sawada	Shin Itagaki	Shingo Tanabe & Shin Itagaki	June 23, 2023
Even with Reigar still at large, Lexia and Luna (with Owen for additional protection) give Yūya a tour of the capital. As they pass the local Adventurer's Guild, Luna spontaneously decides to register herself and Yūya. When Yūya is tested for his magical capabilities, the results, far beyond normal, draws much attention. While Yūya and the ladies are on an herb-gathering quest, Reigar's whereabouts are discovered, and Owen asks Yūya to help apprehend the treacherous prince. Reigar is captured alive, and then the Vile girl appears, revealing she had exploited Reigar into attempting the coup d'état to initiate a genocidal war, and prepares to kill everyone present. Yūya deflects her attacks with his magic and the Vile girl retreats. On Earth, Kaori vainly tries to visit Yūya.
13	"Yūya and Kaori"; Transliteration: "Yūya to Kaori" (Japanese: 優夜と佳織)	Shingo Tanabe	Shin Itagaki	Shingo Tanabe	June 30, 2023
Back at the royal palace, Yūya is asked to participate in Reigar's trial. Reigar states that after Lexia accidentally burned him when her magic went out of control years ago, he let himself be consumed by his rage against her. Reminded of his old life, Yūya uses a magic elixir he's made to cure the Prince. Lexia, unable to hate her brother, exerts her will and gives him a full pardon for his crimes against her, and as a reward for his actions, King Arnold knights Yūya and gifts him Reigar's former estate. Yūya keeps worrying about the Vile girl so much he begins neglecting his friends as he frantically decides to level up for their next confrontation, but the Vile girl ambushes him during his training run. Worried about Yūya, Kaori goes through the portal and enters the Demon's Den, where she witnesses their battle. Usagi appears and pleads with the girl, whom he calls Yuti, to stop the fight, reminding her that her late master was a Divine and a protector of humanity, even as they killed him. Yuti refuses to relent and unleashes her full power, only to be disabled by Akatsuki. This allows Yūya to take her down, and Usagi leaves her in his care. Afterwards, Yuti finally understands that what she's doing is wrong and gives up her desire for revenge. Despite all she has seen and heard, Kaori assures Yūya of her continuing trust in him. In the ending credits, Kaori meets and befriends Lexia and Luna; Yūya and his siblings patch up their relationship; and a now-reformed Yuti emigrates to Earth and enrolls at Ōsei.

==== Television Special ====
No.	Title	Directed by	Written by	Storyboarded by	Original release date
1	"I Got a Cheat Skill in Another World and Became Unrivaled in the Real World, Too - The Legendary Dragon -Awakens"; Transliteration: "Isekai de Chīto Sukiru o Te ni Shita Ore wa, Genjitsu Sekai o mo Musō Suru: Reberu Appu wa Jinsei o Kaeta - Densetsu no Ryū ― Kakusei" (Japanese: 異世界でチート能力を手にした俺は、現実世界をも無双する ～レベルアップは人生を変えた～ 伝説の竜―覚醒)	Unknown	Unknown	TBA	March 31, 2026
Yūya and Kaori bring Yuti to Earth and show her around Tokyo. Yuti enrolls in Ōsei, where her abilities attract a lot of attention, while a group of three Viles are plotting their next move to destroy all Divines in Argena by unleashing Divines corrupted by Vile power against their former fellows, including Gilbert Fister, the Divine Fist. While visiting Argena, Kaori and Yūya see Lexia and Luna under attack by monsters; Yūya saves them, and Lexia quickly befriends Kaori. Yūya and Yuti fight a Fantasy Rabbit, giving the items that it dropped to Kaori for her protection while taking her to a tour of Arselia. The three take on a quest to investigate a dragon, accompanied by Lexia's knights. They encounter the dragon, and Yūya feeds him a pill from the Fantasy Rabbit that makes him shrink to a smaller size and enables him to help himself to a serving of curry that Yūya made. The dragon reveals that he knows the Sage and subjugates himself to Yūya, who names the dragon Ōma. It is then revealed that a living Vile essence is inside of Yuti, as part of her previous corruption, having been planted in her by the three Viles. The essence emerges from Yuti to look for a new host and fights Yūya, Night, and Akatsuki. Yūya offers himself as its next host and it accepts, but after entering his body, the essence is unable to corrupt or control him as he lacks negative feelings. Rabbit returns and is confronted by Fister, who swiftly defeats him. Yūya engages and overpowers Fister with the essence's help, but the essence's dark nature begins to influence his mind. Ōma feeds Akatsuki another size-changing pill, allowing him to pacify Yūya. Fister escapes, but is intercepted and eaten by Ōma. Upon learning of this setback, the three Viles decide that they must do something about Yūya and his allies.

=== Game ===
A free-to-play MMORPG browser game, titled I Got a Cheat Skill in Another World and Became Unrivaled in the Real World Too: Parallel Universe, was announced on March 17, 2023. It will be launched on the G123 platform in multiple languages.

== Reception ==
In May 2018, the web novel won the Grand Prize at the 3rd Kakuyomu Web Novel Contest in the Science Fiction/Modern Fantasy Division. By October 2023, the series had 3 million copies in circulation.

== See also ==
- The Fruit of Evolution – another light novel series by the same author
