= With You, Our Love Will Make It Through =

Japanese manga series

- First tankōbon volume cover

キミと越えて恋になる (Kimi to Koete Koi ni Naru)
- Genre: Coming-of-age; Drama; Romance
- Manga
- Written by: Chihiro Yuzuki
- Published by: Shueisha
- English publisher: NA: Yen Press
- Imprint: Margaret Comics
- Magazine: Manga Mee
- Original run: May 19, 2021 – present
- Volumes: 12
- Anime television series
- Directed by: Shin Itagaki; Hiromi Kimura
- Written by: Shin Itagaki
- Music by: Akiyoshi Yasuda
- Studio: Millepensee
- Licensed by: Remow
- Original network: Tokyo MX, Kansai TV, AT-X, BS11
- Original run: October 14, 2025 – December 30, 2025
- Episodes: 12
- icon

With You, Our Love Will Make It Through (キミと越えて恋になる, Kimi to Koete Koi ni Naru) is a Japanese manga series written and illustrated by Chihiro Yuzuki. It began serialization on Shueisha's Manga Mee service in May 2021. An anime television series adaptation produced by Millepensee aired from October to December 2025.

== Plot ==
The story is set in a world where humans and beastfolk coexist amidst societal prejudices. High school student Mari's ordinary life takes an unexpected turn when she encounters Tsunagu, a beastfolk student who transfers into her class. Initially apprehensive, Mari soon discovers Tsunagu's gentle and steadfast nature as well as being drawn to his furry body while Tsunagu is drawn to Mari through her kindness and smell, leading to a deepening bond that challenges societal norms and Mari's own perceptions.

== Characters ==
Mari Asaka (朝霞 万理, Asaka Mari)
Voiced by: Manaka Iwami (Japanese); Amber May (English)
The main protagonist, she is a student in Shinoha High School who first lived a mostly loner life until she becomes intrigued by her new classmate and friend, Tsunagu.
Tsunagu Hidaka (飛高 繋, Hidaka Tsunagu)
Voiced by: Takuya Eguchi (Japanese); William Ofoegbu (English)
A canine beastfolk student whose compassion and understanding challenges Mari's initial apprehensions.
Yukihiro Aida (相田 雪紘, Aida Yukihiro)
Voiced by: Koutaro Nishiyama (Japanese); Tom Aglio (English)
A friendly and accepting student at Shinoha High School who is a childhood friend of Mari's and readily welcomes a new, extraordinary friend into his life in Tsunagu while developing a crush on Mari.
Kisara (キサラ)
Voiced by: Ai Kakuma (Japanese); Molly Zhang (English)
A feline beastfolk who is childhood friends with Tsunagu, having a deep crush on him since they met as children.

== Media ==
=== Manga ===
Written and illustrated by Chihiro Yuzuki, With You, Our Love Will Make It Through began serialization on Shueisha's Manga Mee manga service on May 19, 2021. Its chapters have been compiled into twelve tankōbon volumes as of September 2026. The series is set to end with its thirteenth volume.

During their panel at Anime Expo 2024, Yen Press announced that they had licensed the series for English publication with the first volume releasing in December 2024.

| No. | Original release date | Original ISBN | North American release date | North American ISBN |
|---|---|---|---|---|
| 1 | December 24, 2021 | 978-4-08-844571-7 | December 10, 2024 | 978-1-97-539732-6 |
Chapters 1–6
| 2 | June 23, 2022 | 978-4-08-844653-0 | April 22, 2025 | 978-1-97-539734-0 |
Chapters 7–12
| 3 | November 25, 2022 | 978-4-08-844657-8 | August 26, 2025 | 978-1-97-539736-4 |
Chapters 13–17
| 4 | April 25, 2023 | 978-4-08-844745-2 | March 24, 2026 | 978-1-97-539738-8 |
Chapters 18–22
| 5 | September 25, 2023 | 978-4-08-844831-2 | January 26, 2027 | 978-1-97-539740-1 |
| 6 | March 25, 2024 | 978-4-08-843013-3 | — | — |
| 7 | August 23, 2024 | 978-4-08-843042-3 | — | — |
| 8 | January 23, 2025 | 978-4-08-843097-3 | — | — |
| 9 | June 25, 2025 | 978-4-08-843144-4 | — | — |
| 10 | September 25, 2025 | 978-4-08-843192-5 | — | — |
| 11 | March 24, 2026 | 978-4-08-843251-9 | — | — |
| 12 | September 25, 2026 | 978-4-08-843301-1 | — | — |
| 13 | December 23, 2026 | 978-4-08-843348-6 | — | — |

=== Anime ===
An anime television series adaptation was announced on January 15, 2025. It is produced by Millepensee and directed by Shin Itagaki and Hiromi Kimura, with series composition and episode screenplays by Itagaki, characters designed by Kimura, and music composed by Akiyoshi Yasuda. The series aired from October 14 to December 30, 2025, on Tokyo MX and other networks. The opening theme song is "Kusuguttai" (くすぐったい。; 'Ticklish'), performed by CHICO with HoneyWorks, while the ending theme song is "Kimi ni Naretara" (きみになれたら; 'If I Can Get Used to You'), performed by Yoh Kamiyama. Remow licensed the series for streaming on Crunchyroll.

==== Episodes ====
| No. | Title | Directed by (Note: Production staff information is taken from the ending credits of each episode.) | Written by | Storyboarded by | Original release date |
|---|---|---|---|---|---|
| 1 | "Episode 1" | Unknown | Unknown | TBA | October 14, 2025 |
Mari Asaka, a student of Yotsunoha High School, is running late. When she arrives, the gate is closed. She meets Tsunagu Hidaka, who got lost. She offers to help him climb over the stone wall, and is surprised to see he is a beastfolk. He grabs her hand to climb over and helps her down, which shocks her. It is revealed in Mari's class, that Tsunagu is a transfer student and will be joining her class. His presence attracts everyone's attention, some good and some bad. Later that evening, Tsunagu is harassed by thugs and when Mari tries to help him, he falls into the river. She goes in, but he rescues her instead. They head back to Mari's house where Tsunagu can shower and they accidentally bumps noses, making them blush. The next day, Tsunagu impress everyone at gym with his athletic abilities. When Mari tries to talk to him in the closet, some jealous students trap them both inside. Tsunagu gets hurt protecting Mari and she bandages his wound. He explains how he wants to be a doctor to treat other beastfolk for injuries, and Mari seeks to help him as his friend. He then starts to sniff Mari and pins her to the ground, terrifying her.
| 2 | "Episode 2" | Unknown | Unknown | TBA | October 21, 2025 |
Aida Yukihiro comes to the gym closet as Tsunagu bites himself to avoid hurting Mari. When Aida gets the door open, Tsunagu leaves first shortly afterwards on his own. Mari and Aida walk down the hallway and as Mari talks to Aida, she and Tsunagu reflect on their brief encounter and the feelings that arose from it. Mari and Aida then notice Ochi and his friends getting ready to throw away Tsunagu's textbooks. They intervene and Tsunagu shows up to protect Mari. When he confronts Ochi, his response ends the confrontation. Tsunagu berates his friends for risking themselves over a petty reason, but they say that they'll keep caring for him. Mari and Aida then get the idea about getting everyone to accept Tsuanagu, but he's afraid of hurting Mari. Aida invites them to his home, and he locks them in his room. Mari and Tsunagu try to figure out their feelings for each other, and Tsunagu nearly hurts Mari, but she manages to stop him. Aida comes in, and after discussing things, the three of them decide to continue hanging out together.
| 3 | "Episode 3" | Unknown | Unknown | TBA | October 28, 2025 |
Mari is at her house taking a bath after going to Aida's house. She's thinking on her feelings as Tsunagu is thinking on his back at his home. Aida texts them, suggesting to eat together during lunch on the roof. They agree and Mari and Tsunagu say goodnight to each other. The following day, Ritsuka gives Mari some cupcakes before she heads to the roof. During lunch, Tsunagu involuntarily tutors Mari and Aida for proficiency exams. After the exams, Tsunagu gets the highest score, much to the dismay of Mari's other friend Ayano. When Ritsuka goes looking for her, she tells Mari and Tsunagu about Ayano's dream of being a writer. They help find Ayano on the roof, throwing away her books. Tsunagu manages to retrieve them and they fix up the books together, then they read it which cheers Ayano up. Ritsuka tells Mari her opinion of Tsunagu which delights her, and she suggests Mari ask him on a date. After helping Aida with cleanup, she and Tsunagu walk together. Mari tries to ask him out, but he mistakes her question as hanging out as a group.
| 4 | "Episode 4" | Unknown | Unknown | TBA | November 4, 2025 |
Tsunagu and Mari ask Aida if he wants to join them, but he declines, saying he needs to practice after hitting a growth spurt. Mari watches as Tsunagu helps Aida practice, and she convinces Aida to join them after his basketball match. Just then, some third-years give Aida a scolding, until Yanagi, a third-year, gets involved and starts a game of third-years against first-years. Aida, Tsunagu, and Mari play together, but they lose the game. Mari compliments Aida, which makes him embarrassed. After he leaves, Tsunagu notices that Mari sprained her ankle and tries to take her to the school nurse. But Mari's feelings make it hard for him to resist, so they duck into an empty room where they share a passionate kiss. Before things go too far, the bell rings, bringing them back to their senses. Mari goes to the nurse, and then back to class. At night, the three of them discuss where to hangout and Mari suggests a dog park. During their time at the park, Tsunagu and Mari step somewhere private and confess their true feelings to one another, while Aida overhears their conversation.
| 5 | "Episode 5" | Unknown | Unknown | TBA | November 11, 2025 |
| 6 | "Episode 6" | Unknown | Unknown | TBA | November 18, 2025 |
| 7 | "Episode 7" | Unknown | Unknown | TBA | November 25, 2025 |
| 8 | "Episode 8" | Unknown | Unknown | TBA | December 2, 2025 |
| 9 | "Episode 9" | Unknown | Unknown | TBA | December 9, 2025 |
| 10 | "Episode 10" | Unknown | Unknown | TBA | December 16, 2025 |
| 11 | "Episode 11" | Unknown | Unknown | TBA | December 23, 2025 |
| 12 | "Episode 12" | Unknown | Unknown | TBA | December 30, 2025 |
