= Teekyu =

Sports comedy manga series, and its anime television series adaptations

- Cover of the first manga volume featuring (from left to right) Nasuno Takamiya, Yuri Oshimoto, Kanae Shinjo and Marimo Bando

てーきゅう (Tēkyū)
- Genre: Comedy, slice of life, sports
- Manga
- Written by: Roots
- Illustrated by: Piyo
- Published by: Earth Star Entertainment
- Magazine: Comic Earth Star
- Original run: February 10, 2012 – January 25, 2018
- Volumes: 15
- Anime television series
- Directed by: Shin Itagaki
- Produced by: Yutaka Goto; Eisuke Imanishi; Sei Moriwaki; Atsushi Iwanami
- Written by: Shin Itagaki
- Studio: MAPPA (seasons 1–3), Millepensee (seasons 4–9)
- Original network: Tokyo MX, AT-X, Niconico
- Original run: October 7, 2012 – September 27, 2017
- Episodes: 108 + 6 OVAs
- Manga

Takamiya Nasuno Desu!
- Written by: Roots
- Illustrated by: Piyo
- Published by: Earth Star Entertainment
- Magazine: Comic Earth Star
- Original run: April 12, 2014 – October 8, 2015
- Volumes: 2
- Anime television series

Takamiya Nasuno Desu!
- Directed by: Shin Itagaki
- Produced by: Yutaka Goto; Eisuke Imanishi; Sei Moriwaki; Atsushi Iwanami
- Written by: Shin Itagaki
- Studio: Millepensee
- Original network: Tokyo MX
- Original run: April 6, 2015 – June 22, 2015
- Episodes: 12 + 1 OVA
- Manga

Usakame
- Written by: Roots
- Illustrated by: Jūzō Kirisawa
- Published by: Earth Star Entertainment
- Magazine: Comic Earth Star
- Original run: September 17, 2015 – June 30, 2016
- Volumes: 3
- Anime television series

Usakame
- Directed by: Shin Itagaki
- Studio: Millepensee
- Original network: Tokyo MX
- Original run: April 11, 2016 – June 27, 2016
- Episodes: 12
- icon

Teekyu (Japanese: てーきゅう, Hepburn: Tēkyū) is a sports comedy manga series written by Roots and illustrated by Piyo. It was serialized in Earth Star Entertainment's Comic Earth Star from February 2012 to January 2018. The name of the series is a pun on the Japanese word for tennis, teikyū (庭球). The manga has been adapted into an anime television series, which ran from 2012 to 2017.

Teekyu also had a spinoff comedy manga series, also serialized in Comic Earth Star, named Takamiya Nasuno Desu! (高宮なすのです！), translated as "I am Takamiya Nasuno!" (full name Takamiya Nasuno Desu! ~Teekyu Spinoff~ (高宮なすのです！〜てーきゅうスピンオフ〜)), featuring one of the main characters of Teekyu in her own adventures. It has had two tankōbon releases, and also received a 12-episode anime adaptation in 2015.

Another spin-off manga series named Usakame (うさかめ) which features the Tennis Club's opponents was released in 2015 and ran for three volumes. It has had three tankōbon releases so far, and also received a 12-episode anime adaptation in 2016.

== Plot ==
The story follows the everyday lives of four girls of the Kameido High School's tennis club. The series' focus is not really on tennis, but on the wacky and eccentric characters, with strange object associations and even stranger misconceptions, on their many random adventures. These adventures have included traveling to an army base, going skiing, helping a cake shop owner with financial troubles, and helping an alien refuel her spaceship.

== Characters ==
Teekyu characters in a promotional poster for the 6th season. From left to right, the characters are Marimo, Nasuno, Kanae, Yuri, Tomarin, Annenkov (bottom-right), and Udonko (top-right).

Yuri Oshimoto (押本 ユリ, Oshimoto Yuri)
Voiced by: Yui Watanabe
Yuri is the only member of the club who actually knows how to play tennis. She is considered the only normal girl in the entire group who takes things seriously, much to her chagrin. She plays the straight man, often giving surprised remarks to the other girls' shocking behavior. She has a younger brother in middle school named Yota.
Kanae Shinjo (新庄 かなえ, Shinjō Kanae)
Voiced by: Suzuko Mimori
Kanae is a second year student though she does not act like it at times. She likes to do things that break norms, such as getting a tennis racket with strings made from her grandmother's hair or sleeping by standing up and with her head against the wall, and sometimes even breaks laws of physics, such as sinking into solid ground or splitting herself in two. She tends to freak out Yuri and/or Nasuno in the process.
Nasuno Takamiya (高宮 なすの, Takamiya Nasuno)
Voiced by: Kyoko Narumi
Nasuno hails from a rich family. Having returned from a trip in Ngaoundéré, Cameroon, she wants to try out for the tennis club, though she has no idea how to play begin the most normal of the Second Year students. If Yuri was not present, she acts as the straight man. Nasuno is capable of providing for her own and other characters' outlandish ideas with her vast amounts of wealth. In her spinoff series, Takamiya Nasuno Desu!, she spends her summer at her family's vacation cottage, relaxing and ordering around Yota.
Marimo Bando (坂東 まりも, Bandō Marimo)
Voiced by: Kana Hanazawa
Marimo is another second year student who hails from the same school as the other members. She has a large number of misconceptions about the world, and her antics tend to get herself and others in trouble, and sometimes in harm. Examples include wearing and actually eating a girls' panties and kidnapping a child. She does have a kind nature to her, despite her lack of maturity and self-control. Despite being the crazier member of the club, she ends up being the voice of reason when the others aren't around.
Tomarin (トマリン)
Voiced by: Yui Ogura
An alien from another planet, she crash lands on Earth due to her spaceship losing fuel, and she meets Marimo. Marimo and Tomarin then become roommates and friends. She is pretty cheerful, but can be easily scared. Tomarin has humorous misconceptions about Earth, which are not helped by Marimo's own misconceptions.
Udonko Kondo (近藤 うどん子, Kondō Udonko)
Voiced by: Kaori Ishihara
A classmate of Yuri's, she works for the school's newspaper. She has a lot of curiosity, but generally means well. She seems to have abnormal priorities in her life, and focuses on things that other people wouldn't focus on.
Annenkov Kondo (近藤 アネンコフ, Kondō Anenkofu)
Voiced by: Eri Kitamura
Udonko's older sister. She works as a bhikkhu (exorcist).
Kinako Tanaka (田中 きなこ, Tanaka Kinako)
Voiced by: Yuki Nakashima
Kinako is a second year student.
Kurumi Sato (佐藤 くるみ, Satō Kurumi)
Voiced by: Hikaru Koide
Kurumi is a third year student.
Ayako Suzuki (鈴木 あやこ, Suzuki Ayako)
Voiced by: Izumi Nakaida
Ayako is a third year student.
Nishi Nishiaraidaishi (西新井大師 西, Nishiaraidaishi Nishi)
Voiced by: Maria Tanijiri
Nishi is a first year student.
Sora Shibakusa (芝草 宇宙, Shibakusa Sora)
Voiced by: Sora Tokui
Sora is a tennis club adviser, former Usakame high school tennis club member.
Yota Oshimoto (押本 陽太, Oshimoto Yōta)
Voiced by: Ryōta Ōsaka
Yuri's younger brother who seems to live a rather average life. Nasuno employed him as her butler during their summer break, often having him perform meaningless tasks or tasks with outrageous conditions or rules. Throughout the spinoff, Takamiya Nasuno Desu!, he works as Nasuno's Butler and acts as the straight man, giving snappy or confused remarks to the actions of Nasuno and her weird family. He tends to be the responsible person in situations where Nasuno's family is not.
Udon shop manager (うどん屋の店長, Udon-ya no tenchō)
Voiced by: Hirokazu Machida
Udonko and Annenkov's grandfather.
Grandma (おばあちゃん, Obāchan)
Voiced by: Marie Miyake
Kanae's grandmother.
Yucatan (ユカタン, Yukatan)
Voiced by: Shinya Takahashi
She is acquainted with Kanae, came to the migrant from the Yucatan Peninsula.
Mika-san (ミカさん)
Voiced by: Hitomi Ōwada
She is a cousin of Kanae, kindergarten staff that Bobby is management.
Bobby (ボビー, Bobī)
Voiced by: Yoshiyuki Shimozuma
He is acquainted with Kanae, The director of the kindergarten. He is former United States Navy SEALs.
Ayano Takamiya (高宮 あやの, Takamiya Ayano)
Voiced by: Yukari Tamura
Nasuno's mother, she looks extremely young for her age. She is pretty energetic and sometimes direct. She tends to join Nasuno and Yota on their adventures, but is generally care-free, leaving Yota to have to be the responsible one.
Nasuno's father / Alfred (なすの "父" / アルフレッド, Nasuno "chichi" / Arufureddo)
Voiced by: Shinya Takahashi
Nasuno's father, he looks like Colonel Sanders.
Cake shop manager / Tenchio Keikiya (ケーキ屋の店長 / 形木矢 貂千雄, Kēki-ya no tenchō / Keikiya Tenchio)
Voiced by: Hirokazu Machida
The manager of the cake shop he has hired the Nasuno's father.
Hoheto Irohani (色葉似 ほへと, Irohani Hoheto)
Voiced by: Arisa Aihara
She is a maid of Takamiya house, former Usakame high school tennis club member, a junior of Sora.
Moriko Bando (板東 森子, Bandō Moriko)
Voiced by: Chisa Yūki
Marimo's mother.
Tasuku Furubira (古平 たすく, Furubira Tasuku)
Voiced by: Kanon Takao
She is Kinako's classmate, Kameido junior high school classmate of Nasuno.
Miyako Baba / Ba-myan (馬場 みやこ / ばーみゃん, Baba Miyako / Bā-myan)
Voiced by: Eri Sogabe
She is Kinako's classmate, Kameido junior high school classmate of Nasuno.
Usami Nakata (中田 有佐美, Nakata Usami)
She is Nishi's classmate, tennis is good, but not in the tennis club.
Tsumire Sugiya (杉谷 つみれ, Sugiya Tsumire)
She is Kurumi and Ayako's classmate, badminton club member.
Sana Arakaki (新垣 さな, Arakaki Sana)
She is Kurumi and Ayako's classmate, badminton club member.

== Media ==
=== Manga ===
==== Teekyu ====
The Teekyu manga series is written by Roots and illustrated by Piyo. Its first chapter was published by Earth Star Entertainment in Comic Earth Star's 12th issue, released on February 10, 2012, and the series has also been compiled in 15 tankōbon volumes. On March 3, 2021, a one-shot was published. The one-shot takes place a decade after the end of the manga.

No.	Release date	ISBN
1	August 11, 2012	978-4-8030-0363-5
2	October 12, 2012	978-4-8030-0385-7
3	December 12, 2012	978-4-8030-0395-6
4	June 12, 2013	978-4-8030-0470-0
5	August 12, 2013	978-4-8030-0488-5
6	October 12, 2013	978-4-8030-0507-3
7	December 12, 2013	978-4-8030-0518-9
8	July 11, 2014	978-4-8030-0593-6
9	March 12, 2015	978-4-8030-0691-9
10	September 12, 2015	978-4-8030-0784-8
11	April 12, 2016	978-4-8030-0903-3
12	October 12, 2016	978-4-8030-0961-3
13	April 12, 2017	978-4-8030-1026-8
14	August 10, 2017	978-4-8030-1087-9
15	February 10, 2018	978-4-8030-1158-6

==== Takamiya Nasuno Desu! ====
The Takamiya Nasuno Desu! manga is also written by Roots and illustrated by Piyo, and also published by Earth Star Entertainment. It is a spinoff of Teekyu that focuses on the daily life of Takamiya Nasuno. It has, as of October 10, 2015, had two tankōbon volumes released.

No.	Release date	ISBN
1	March 12, 2015	978-4-8030-0693-3
2	October 10, 2015	978-4-8030-0799-2

==== Usakame ====
No.	Release date	ISBN
1	December 12, 2015	978-4-8030-0829-6
2	March 12, 2016	978-4-8030-0863-0
3	June 11, 2016	978-4-8030-0924-8

=== Anime ===
Announcement of an anime adaptation of Teekyu came in August 2012, alongside the release of the first tankobon. The announcement came five months after the manga was first published, the fastest manga-release-to-anime-announcement time that Earth Star Entertainment has ever had. Each episode of the anime is about 2 minutes long, so characters speak and actions are performed at a very quick pace, with shortcuts used to save time on animation sometimes. Shin Itagaki is the director and writer for each season.

The series has had nine seasons so far. The first season aired between October 7 and December 23, 2012, the second one between July 7 and September 22, 2013, and the third one between October 6 and December 22, 2013. The fourth season aired from April 6, 2015, to June 22, 2015. The fifth season began airing on July 6, 2015. The sixth season aired from October 5, 2015, to December 21, 2015. The seventh season ran from January 12, 2016, to March 29, 2016. The eighth season ran from on October 5, 2016, to December 21, 2016. The ninth season aired from July to September 2017.

Takamiya Nasuno Desu! received a 12-episode adaptation, and aired on the same days as the fourth season of Teekyu, from April 6, 2015, to June 22, 2015. Like Teekyu, each episode is two minutes in length, and character speech and actions are performed at a quick pace. Shin Itagaki is also the director and writer for this series.

Usakame received a 12-episode adaptation from April 11, 2016, to June 27, 2016.

=== Stage play ===
There was a stage play adaptation of Teekyu called "Butai-ban Teekyu Senpai to Meguriau Jikantachi" (舞台版てーきゅう ～先輩とめぐりあう時間たち～) ("Stage Play Edition Teekyu: The Times to Come Across with Senpai"), about a musical being put on by the tennis club members during their high school's Culture Festival. The play was performed at Japan Newart College Omori Campus Theater in Tokyo, Japan, from July 29 and August 2, 2015.

== Reception ==
Chris Beveridge of The Fandom Post, reviewing the first three episodes, gave the anime a C, stating that he enjoyed the comedy, but the short length of the episodes and the quick pace ruined the experience. Ryan Hand of B-TEN, reviewing the first 3 seasons, gave the show a 5.25 out of 10, again stating that he enjoyed the show and its characters (despite there being no character development). However, he criticized the poor animation and art, although he commented on how it fits the fast-paced action of the show. It has been suggested that the show has not been as well received outside of Japan due to the language barrier for non-native speakers, causing difficulty in following the unusually fast-paced dialogue.

The official Twitter account for the franchise has over 20,000 followers.
