= Millepensee =

Japanese animation studio

Millepensee, Co., Ltd.
- Native name: 株式会社ミルパンセ
- Romanized name: Kabushiki-gaisha Mirupanse
- Type: Kabushiki gaisha
- Industry: Japanese animation
- Founded: 2013; 13 years ago
- Founder: Naoko Shiraishi
- Headquarters: Sekimachihigashi, Nerima, Tokyo, Japan
- Key people: Naoko Shiraishi (CEO)
- Website: millepensee.com

Millepensee, Co., Ltd. (Japanese: 株式会社ミルパンセ, Hepburn: Kabushiki-gaisha Mirupanse) is a Japanese animation studio founded in 2013 and based in Nerima, Tokyo.

On February 10, 2020, it was announced that Millepensee had formed a partnership with Sanzigen to form 3DCG animation studio lXlXl.

== Establishment ==
The studio was founded in 2013 by producer Naoko Shiraishi. Director Shin Itagaki has been involved with all of the studio's main productions since its inception with the exception of the Wake Up, Girls!! films. Itagaki and Shiraishi are married.

== Works ==
=== Television series ===
Title	Director(s)	First run start date	First run end date	Eps	Note(s)	Ref.
Takamiya Nasuno Desu!	Shin Itagaki	April 6, 2015	June 22, 2015	12	Adaptation of a manga by Roots and Piyo.	
Teekyu	Shin Itagaki	April 6, 2015	September 27, 2017	72	Adaptation of a manga by Roots and Piyo. Episodes 37–108 (season 4–9).	
Usakame	Shin Itagaki	April 11, 2016	June 27, 2016	12	Adaptation of a manga by Roots and Jūzō Kirisawa.	
Berserk	Shin Itagaki	July 1, 2016	June 23, 2017	24	Adaptation of a manga by Kentaro Miura. Sequel to Berserk: The Golden Age Arc. Co-animated with GEMBA. Production co-operation by Liden Films.	
Wake Up, Girls! New Chapter	Shin Itagaki	October 9, 2017	January 7, 2018	13	Original work (based on the franchise).	
Cop Craft	Shin Itagaki	July 8, 2019	September 30, 2019	12	Adaptation of a light novel by Shoji Gatoh.	
So I'm a Spider, So What?	Shin Itagaki	January 8, 2021	July 3, 2021	24	Adaptation of a light novel by Okina Baba.	
I Got a Cheat Skill in Another World and Became Unrivaled in the Real World, Too	Shin Itagaki (Chief); Shingo Tanabe	April 7, 2023	June 30, 2023	13	Adaptation of a light novel by Miku.	
Okitsura: Fell in Love with an Okinawan Girl, but I Just Wish I Know What She's Saying	Shin Itagaki (Chief); Shingo Tanabe	January 5, 2025	March 23, 2025	12	Adaptation of a manga by Egumi Sora.	
With You, Our Love Will Make It Through	Shin Itagaki; Hiromi Kimura	October 14, 2025	December 30, 2025	12	Adaptation of a manga by Chihiro Yuzuki.	
I Got a Cheat Skill in Another World and Became Unrivaled in the Real World, Too (season 2)	Shin Itagaki	January 2027	TBA	TBA	Sequel to I Got a Cheat Skill in Another World and Became Unrivaled in the Real World, Too.	

=== OVA/ONAs ===
Title	Director(s)	Released	Eps	Note(s)	Ref.
Takamiya Nasuno Desu!	Shin Itagaki	August 28, 2015	1		
Teekyu	Shin Itagaki	August 28, 2015 – March 17, 2017	11	Episodes 5–15	

=== Films ===
Title	Director(s)	Released	Note(s)	Ref.
Wake Up, Girls! Seishun no Kage	Yutaka Yamamoto	September 25, 2015	Part 1 of Wake Up, Girls! 2. Co-animated with Ordet.	
Wake Up, Girls! Beyond the Bottom	Yutaka Yamamoto	December 11, 2015	Part 2 of Wake Up, Girls! 2. Co-animated with Ordet.	

=== Music videos ===
Title	Director(s)	Release date	Artist	Note(s)	Ref.
Kanojo wa Zombie	Shin Itagaki	January 25, 2016	Glay		

== See also ==
- Shaft—Millepensee founder Naoko Shiraishi worked for Shaft before transferring to Gainax around 2002
- Gainax—Shiraishi worked for Gainax until 2012, and founded Millepensee the year later
