= Kyoko Narumi =

Japanese voice actress and singer

Kyoko Narumi (鳴海 杏子, Narumi Kyōko; born March 13, 1986 in Tokyo) is a female Japanese voice actress and singer. After graduating from high school, she entered the Earth Star Entertainment agency and was very well received in the industry work in voice acting. She attended Shoto Actors Gymnasium. She is best known for voicing Nasuno Takamiya in the Teekyu series, Maria in Pupa and Misaki Toyoda in Wanna Be the Strongest in the World.

== Filmography ==
=== Television animation ===
2012

- Gon (manga) – Prairie dog child
- Sengoku Collection – Dancer (ep 2)
- Teekyu series – Nasuno Takamiya
- World War Blue – Crystal

2013

- Amnesia – Ikki Fan (6 episodes)
- Wanna Be the Strongest in the World – Misaki Toyoda
- Brothers Conflict – Audience Member A (ep 5); Female Student C (ep 2)
- Mangirl! – Maid manager
- Encouragement of Climb series – Classmate B (ep 1); Climber B (ep 9); Mother (ep 3); Additional Voices

2014

- Nobunagun – Classmate (ep 3); Maria Williams (eps 1, 4-5, 7-13)
- Pupa – Maria

2016

- ReLIFE – Female Student (eps 2, 4); Girl (eps 1, 5); Girl B (ep 1); Volleyball Club Member B (ep 8)
