= Wanna Be the Strongest in the World! =

Japanese manga series

- First tankōbon volume cover, featuring Sakura Hagiwara

世界でいちばん強くなりたい! (Sekai de Ichiban Tsuyoku Naritai!)
- Genre: Sports
- Manga
- Written by: ESE
- Illustrated by: Kiyohito Natsuki
- Published by: Earth Star Entertainment
- Magazine: Comic Earth Star
- Original run: March 12, 2011 – December 12, 2013
- Volumes: 5
- Anime television series
- Directed by: Rion Kujo
- Produced by: Hiroaki Tsunoda; Gorō Shinjuku; Hiroshi Gotō; Hiroaki Ōshiro; Mitsuhiro Matsuo; Hiroyuki Kamei; Yūya Machida; Shinichi Takahashi; Kenichirō Kaneda
- Written by: Kazuho Hyōdō
- Music by: Kayō Konishi; Yukio Kondō
- Studio: Arms
- Licensed by: Crunchyroll (streaming); AUS: Madman Entertainment
- Original network: AT-X, Tokyo MX, ytv
- Original run: October 6, 2013 – December 22, 2013
- Episodes: 12 + 6 OVA
- icon

Wanna Be the Strongest in the World! (Japanese: 世界でいちばん強くなりたい!, Hepburn: Sekai de Ichiban Tsuyoku Naritai!) is a Japanese manga series written by ESE and illustrated by Kiyohito Natsuki. It was serialized in Earth Star Entertainment's Comic Earth Star from March 2011 to December 2013. An anime television series adaptation by Arms aired from October to December 2013.

== Plot ==
Sakura Hagiwara is a pop idol and member of the fictional Japanese idol group Sweet Diva. One day, however, a female wrestler named Rio Kazama beats up Elena Miyazawa, a fellow Sweet Diva member and Sakura's rival, after she hears the latter claim that professional wrestling is easy. To avenge Elena, Sakura is introduced to the Berserk Wrestlers team, of which Rio is a member. Eventually, Sakura proves to be a natural athlete with potential and joins the team.

== Characters ==
=== Sweet Diva ===
Sakura Hagiwara (萩原 さくら, Hagiwara Sakura)
Voiced by: Ayana Taketatsu (Japanese); Lindsay Seidel (credited as Elizabeth Lewis) (English)
A 17-year-old girl who is a leader of the idol group Sweet Diva. She becomes the central vocalist at the start of the series. Initially cheerful and bright, she always puts her idol group before her own feelings but always tries her best at anything.
Elena Miyazawa (宮澤 エレナ, Miyazawa Erena)
Voiced by: Kana Asumi (Japanese); Monica Rial (English)
A 17-year-old girl who is member of the idol group Sweet Diva. She is Sakura's rival who is a tomboy and strong-minded.
Aika Hayase (早瀬 愛華, Hayase Aika)
Voiced by: Sora Amamiya (Japanese); Kristin Sutton (English)
A member of the idol group Sweet Diva who is always seen together with Yuuho. Although bright and cheerful like Sakura, Aika is also a bit timid.
Yuuho Mochizuki (望月 悠歩, Mochizuki Yūho)
Voiced by: Miku Itō (Japanese); Didi Archilla (English)
A member of the idol group Sweet Diva who is always seen together with Aika. She is the mood maker of the group.
Nanami Kanno (菅野 七海, Kanno Nanami)
Voiced by: Yuka Ōtsubo (Japanese); Michelle Lee (English)
Sweet Diva's another leader. Like Elena and Sakura, she is 17 years old, but acts way older and is really calm.
Makoto Kirishima (桐島 真琴, Kirishima Makoto)
Voiced by: Eri Kitamura (Japanese); Vanessa DeSilvio (English)
Sweet Diva's manager.

=== Berserk Wrestlers ===
Rio Kazama (風間 璃緒, Kazama Rio)
Voiced by: Haruka Tomatsu (Japanese); Martha Harms (English)
A mid-class wrestler who was the one who attacked Elena.
Misaki Toyoda (豊田 美咲, Toyoda Misaki)
Voiced by: Kyoko Narumi (Japanese); Leah Clark (English)
Berserk's Ace pro wrestler, she too was a former idol like Sakura. She is usually seen together with Kanae.
Chinatsu Suzumoto (鈴元 千夏, Suzumoto Chinatsu)
Voiced by: Suzuko Mimori (Japanese); Anastasia Muñoz (English)
Kurea Komiyama (小宮山 紅亜, Komiyama Kurea)
Voiced by: Sumire Uesaka (Japanese); Morgan Garrett (English)
Hornet (ホーネット, Hōnetto)
Voiced by: Sora Tokui (Japanese); Elizabeth Evans (English)
Seiichi Inoba (猪場 清一, Inoba Seiichi)
Voiced by: Fumihiko Tachiki (Japanese); David Thompson (English)
The President of Berserk, an ex-pro wrestler who is 51 years old.
Moe Fukuoka (福岡 萌, Fukuoka Moe)
Voiced by: Hisako Kanemoto (Japanese); Cristina Vee (English)
A karate prodigy and Inoba's mentor's granddaughter. She became interested in pro wrestling because of Sakura. Her style in the ring incorporates elements of karate together with pro wrestling, and she uses powerful blows to stagger her opponent.

=== Other characters ===
Kanae Fujishita (藤下 香苗, Fujishita Kanae)
Voiced by: Rina Satō (Japanese); Bryn Apprill (English)
An enthusiastic news reporter who loves pro wrestling.
Jackal Tojo (ジャッカル東条, Jakkaru Tōjō)
Voiced by: Chiaki Takahashi (Japanese); Lydia Mackay (English)
Renowned world champion pro wrestler and Misaki's mentor. Like Misaki, she sees Sakura's potential, prompting Jackal to challenge her in a wrestling match.
Juri Sanada (真田 朱里, Sanada Juri)
Voiced by: Kana Hanazawa (Japanese); Megan Shipman (English)
The owner of Miyabi and another of Jackal's students. She is considered to be Misaki's rival.
Blue Panther
She is a masked pro wrestler "assassin" that works for Miyabi. She tends to be a show-off, is a bit of a brute and is despised by Sakura because of it.

== Media ==
=== Manga ===
Written by ESE and illustrated by Kiyohito Natsuki, Wanna Be the Strongest in the World! was serialized in Earth Star Entertainment's Comic Earth Star from March 12, 2011, to December 12, 2013. Its chapters were collected in five tankōbon, published from October 12, 2011, to December 12, 2013.

==== Volumes ====
No.	Japanese release date	Japanese ISBN
1	October 12, 2011	978-4-80-300281-2
2	April 12, 2012	978-4-80-300329-1
3	April 12, 2013	978-4-80-300430-4
4	September 12, 2013	978-4-80-300503-5
5	December 12, 2013	978-4-80-300517-2

=== Drama CD ===
On October 12, 2011, a drama CD was released with the first volume of the manga, with Aki Toyosaki voicing Sakura and Yōko Hikasa voicing Elena.

=== Anime ===
An anime television series adaptation was formally announced on April 1, 2013. The series was produced by Arms and directed by Rion Kujo, with character designs provided by Rin Shin. It aired from October 6 to December 22, 2013, on AT-X, Tokyo MX, and YTV. The opening theme is "Beautiful Dreamer" (ビューティフル・ドリーマー) by Kyoko Narumi and the first ending theme is "Fan Fanfare!!!" by Ayana Taketatsu, Kana Asumi, Yuka Ōtsubo, Miku Itō, and Sora Amamiya, starting from Episodes 1–7 and 9–12, whilst the second ending theme for Episode 8 is "Sky Color Monologue" (空色モノローグ; lit. "Sky Blue Monologue") by Kyoko Narumi. (Note: "Sky Color Monologue" by Kyoko Narumi is heard during the end credits of Episode 8.) An OVA episode is bundled in each Blu-ray and DVD volume of the series.

Funimation licensed in North America. In Australia and New Zealand, the series is licensed by Madman Entertainment.

==== Episodes ====
No.	Title (Note: All English titles are taken from Funimation.)	Original release date
1	"An Idol Wrestler Is Born!"; Transliteration: "Aidoru Resurā Tanjō!" (Japanese: アイドルレスラー誕生!)	October 6, 2013
2	"Pro Debut!"; Transliteration: "Puro Debyū!" (Japanese: プロデビュー!)	October 13, 2013
3	"Give Up!"; Transliteration: "Gibuappu!" (Japanese: ギブアップ!)	October 20, 2013
4	"This Is Pro Wrestling!"; Transliteration: "Kore ga Puro Resuda!" (Japanese: これがプロレスだ!)	October 27, 2013
5	"The Night Before the Match!"; Transliteration: "Kessen Zen'ya!" (Japanese: 決戦前夜!)	November 3, 2013
6	"Revenge Match!"; Transliteration: "Ribenji Matchi!" (Japanese: リベンジマッチ!)	November 10, 2013
7	"The World Champion Comes to Japan!"; Transliteration: "Sekai Chanpion Rainichi!" (Japanese: 世界チャンピオン来日!)	November 17, 2013
8	"World Class Wrestling!"; Transliteration: "Sekai no Chikara!" (Japanese: 世界の力!)	November 24, 2013
9	"The Awesome Newcomer!"; Transliteration: "Kyōi no Shinjin!" (Japanese: 驚異の新人!)	December 1, 2013
10	"Sakura's Fate!"; Transliteration: "Sakura no Shukumei!" (Japanese: さくらの宿命!)	December 8, 2013
11	"Pure Soul!"; Transliteration: "Pyua Sōru!" (Japanese: ピュアソウル!)	December 15, 2013
12	"To the World!"; Transliteration: "Sekai e!" (Japanese: 世界へ!)	December 22, 2013

==== OVA ====
No.	Title	Original release date
1	"Shocking Mud Wrestling!"; Transliteration: "Shōgeki no Doro Resuringu!" (Japanese: 衝撃の泥レスリング!)	December 12, 2013
2	"Super Lotion Sumo!"; Transliteration: "Hissatsu no Rōshon Sumou!" (Japanese: 必殺のローション相撲!)	January 11, 2014
3	"Battle! Hot-Water Bath!"; Transliteration: "Daisakusen! Nettōburo!" (Japanese: 大決戦! 熱湯風呂!)	February 12, 2014
4	"Hagiwara Sakura & Toyota Misaki Dream Tag Team Comes True! Digger Yamamoto & Hornet"; Transliteration: "Hagiwara Sakura & Toyota Misaki Yume no Taggu Kessei! VS Yunbo Yamamoto & Hōnetto VOL. 1" (Japanese: 萩原さくら&豊田美咲 夢のタッグ結成! VS ユンボ山本&ホーネット VOL.1)	March 12, 2014
5	"Hagiwara Sakura & Toyota Misaki Dream Tag Team Comes True! Digger Yamamoto & Hornet"; Transliteration: "Hagiwara Sakura & Toyota Misaki Yume no Taggu Kessei! VS Yunbo Yamamoto & Hōnetto VOL. 2" (Japanese: 萩原さくら&豊田美咲 夢のタッグ結成! VS ユンボ山本&ホーネット VOL.2)	April 12, 2014
6	"Hagiwara Sakura & Toyota Misaki Dream Tag Team Comes True! Digger Yamamoto & Hornet"; Transliteration: "Hagiwara Sakura & Toyota Misaki Yume no Taggu Kessei! VS Yunbo Yamamoto & Hōnetto VOL. 3" (Japanese: 萩原さくら&豊田美咲 夢のタッグ結成! VS ユンボ山本&ホーネット VOL.3)	May 12, 2014
