= So I'm a Spider, So What? =

Japanese light novel series and its franchise

- Cover of the first light novel

蜘蛛ですが、なにか？ (Kumo Desu ga, Nanika?)
- Genre: Adventure, isekai
- Novel series
- Written by: Okina Baba
- Published by: Shōsetsuka ni Narō
- Original run: May 27, 2015 – January 28, 2022
- Light novel
- Written by: Okina Baba
- Illustrated by: Tsukasa Kiryu
- Published by: Fujimi Shobo
- English publisher: NA: Yen Press
- Imprint: Kadokawa Books
- Original run: December 10, 2015 – January 8, 2022
- Volumes: 16 + 2 extra
- Manga
- Written by: Asahiro Kakashi
- Published by: Kadokawa Shoten
- English publisher: NA: Yen Press
- Magazine: Young Ace Up
- Original run: December 22, 2015 – present
- Volumes: 16
- Manga

So I'm a Spider, So What? The Daily Lives of the Kumoko Sisters
- Written by: Gratin Tori
- Published by: Kadokawa Shoten
- English publisher: NA: Yen Press
- Magazine: Young Ace Up
- Original run: July 18, 2019 – December 8, 2022
- Volumes: 6
- Anime television series
- Directed by: Shin Itagaki
- Produced by: Jōtarō Ishigami
- Written by: Okina Baba; Yūichirō Momose
- Music by: Shūji Katayama
- Studio: Millepensee (Note: Production assistance (制作協力) for all episodes provided by ENGI.)
- Licensed by: Crunchyroll: SA/SEA: Medialink
- Original network: AT-X, Tokyo MX, BS11, KBS, SUN, TVA
- Original run: January 8, 2021 – July 3, 2021
- Episodes: 24
- icon

So I'm a Spider, So What? (Japanese: 蜘蛛ですが、なにか？, Hepburn: Kumo Desu ga, Nanika?) is a Japanese light novel isekai series written by Okina Baba and illustrated by Tsukasa Kiryu. The story follows a class that is killed in a mysterious explosion and reincarnated into an RPG-esque world with one girl reincarnated as a dungeon spider. The spider continually evolves and ends up having a significant influence on the world, becoming one of its most powerful creatures, while the students and their teacher deal with the fallout from her actions and those of other armies. The series has received a manga adaptation, and an anime television series adaptation produced by Millepensee aired from January to July 2021.

== Plot ==
In a world where the battle between Hero and Demon Lord repeated itself, an enormous space-time spell misfired and hit a Japanese high school class on Earth, killing everyone in it. The students were all reincarnated into that other world. While some became royalty, nobles, and other influential people, one girl was reborn as a spider monster of the weakest kind in a dungeon filled with vicious beasts, where she is forced to experience hardship. Armed with her human knowledge and positivity, she strives to survive against creatures much stronger than herself.

== Media ==
=== Light novels ===
Okina Baba originally serialized the series as a web novel on the user-generated content site Shōsetsuka ni Narō starting on May 27, 2015. Fujimi Shobo acquired the series for print publication, and published the first light novel, with illustrations by Tsukasa Kiryu, in December 2015. Yen Press announced during their panel at Sakura-Con on April 15, 2017, that they had licensed the series. The series' main story ended with its 16th volume released on January 8, 2022.

No.	Original release date	Original ISBN	English release date	English ISBN
1	December 10, 2015	978-4-04-070829-4	November 21, 2017	978-0-316-41289-6
1: Starting with a Bang; S1: The End of Normal Life; 2: A Rent-Free Home; S2: Reincarnation; 3: The Egg; 4: Leaving the Nest; S3: The Hatchling; 5: My First Monster Battle; S4: Skills; 6: Bonus Stage?; S5: The Second Classmate; 7: I'm Evolving!; Interlude: An Adventurer's Solioquy; 8: The Fall; Interlude: An Adventurer's Withdrawal; 9: Spider vs Bee; S6: Training; 10: Clearing the Lower Stratum; S7: The Second Prince; Interlude: The Hero and the King; 11: Still Clearing the Lower Stratum; S8: The Elf Maiden; 12: Battling Three Hundered Feet Up; 13: The End
2	March 10, 2016	978-4-04-070849-2	March 27, 2018	978-0-316-44288-6
1: Clearly, God Hates Spiders; J1: Hero Party; 2: Pride and Detection; S1: Academy; Interlude: The Duke's Daughter and Her Teacher; 3: Middle Stratum Play-Through, Start!; J2: The Nightmare's Vestige; 4: Wyrm? Not Fish?; S2: Magic Lesson; Interlude: The Duke's Daughter and the Prince's Sister; 5: Spider vs Fire Wyrm; S3: Fei's Training Diary; Interlude: The Duke's Daughter and the Earth Wyrm; 6: Zoa Ele; S4: School Life; Interlude: The Duke's Daughter and the Future Saint; 7: The Administrator's Shadow; S5: Ruling Class; 8: Wisdom; S6: Earth Wyrm Attack; Interlude: Despair of the Defeated; Interlude: The Duke's Daughter and the Noisy Reincarnations; 9: Lord of the Fire Sea; Interlude: The Demon Lord's Aide Sighs at a Meeting; J3: And So the War Began; S7: The Voice That Announces Ruination; Interlude: Spider Demon Lord; Final Act: God Loves Spiders
3	July 9, 2016	978-4-04-070942-0	July 31, 2018	978-0-316-44290-9
1: I'm Going to Find the Outside!; S1: New Hero; Interlude: The Teacher and the Third Prince; 2: Labyrinth's Zenith, I Call Thee Mother; S2: Omen; 3: Spider vs Fire Dragon; S3: Julius; Interlude: The Hero's Master; 4: Dragon Slayer; S4: Fall; 5: First Encounter with an Administrator; K: A Man's Final Stubbornness; 6: Middle Stratum Cleared; S5: Escape; Interlude: The Ruler and the Ninja; Special Chapter: The Great Elroe Labyrinth Disaster Investigation Corps; S6: Hiding; 7: Encounter with Humans; S7: Battle in the Capital; Interlude: The Elderly Mage and the Ruler; 8: The Earth Dragons of the Lower Stratum; S8: Mercy; Interlude: ???; 9: Spider vs Spider; Special Chapter: The Nightmare of the Labyrinth; 10: I Still Don't Know the Stupid Nickname of "Nightmare of the Labyrinth" That I Got That Day; S9: To the Home of the Elves; Interlude: The Ruler and the Younger Sister; 11: Spider vs Earth Dragon Araba; Interlude: The Demon Lord's Memories of the Earth Dragon; Final Chapter: I'm Going Outside!
4	October 8, 2016	978-4-04-072062-3	November 27, 2018	978-0-316-44291-6
1: Clear Blue Sky; S1: To the Great Elroe Labyrinth; Interlude: The Demon Lord's Aide Sighs at a Meeting Again; 2: Spirit Battle vs Mother; S2: Entering the Great Elroe Labyrinth; 3: Mother Attack; S3: Navigating the Great Elroe Labyrinth; 4: A Brush with Death; S4: The Terror of the Great Elroe Labyrinth; 5: Evolution; S5: Escape from the Great Elroe Labyrinth; 6: Guerrilla Warfare; S6: The Dark Secrets of the Other World; Interlude: God's Hunting Dog; 7: Demon Lord Attack; S7: Reincarnations; 8: Returning Monster of the Week Always Gets Killed Right Away; S8: The Elf Village; 9: Water Spider; S9: The Reincarnations in the Elf Village; 10: Playing with Dolls; S10: The Reincarnations Gather; Interlude: The Administrators' Reincarnation Allies; 11: Matricide; Interlude: Demon Lord; Interlude: Chief of the Elves; Final Chapter: First Encounter
5	February 10, 2017	978-4-04-072186-6	March 19, 2019	978-1-9753-0194-1
1: The Spider and the Vampire; S1: Two Days Before the Battle; Interlude: The Half Elf's Half-Life; 2: The Town; Special Chapter: The Conspirators: Chief of the Elves; S2: The Day Before the Battle; Interlude: The Wyrm and the Half Elf; S3: The Battle of the Elf Village Begins; 3: To Catch a Thief; Special Chapter: The Conspirators: The Pontiff of the Word of God; O1: The Battle of the Elf Village: Because I'm Their Teacher; Interlude: A Lord Perplexed; O2: Let Us Fight; 4: Worship Meee!; S4: Fateful Confrontation; Interlude: The Lord's Anguish; S5: Hero Party vs Vampire Princess; 5: Machinations in Motion; Interlude: The Demon Lord and the Administrator; 6: Spider vs Demon Lord vs Hero; S6: A Terrible Reunion; 7: Resurrection; S7: The Ogre Bares His Fangs; 8: Evolution, Division, Propagation; Interlude: The Servant's Struggle; 9: Worst Elf Ever!; Interlude: Clash of the Ancients; Final Chapter: A New Journey Begins
6	June 9, 2017	978-4-04-072325-9	August 20, 2019	978-1-9753-0196-5
Report on the Nightmare of the Labyrinth Part 1; 1: Misery Loves Company; Conversation: Meeting of the Parallel Minds #1 — We've Got Skills!; R1: The Old Man Goes on a Journey; V1: Fortune, Misfortune; Interlude: The Servant's Hesitation; 2: The Clothes Make the Spider; R2: The Old Man Seeks an Apprenticeship; Conversation: Meeting of the Parallel Minds #2 — Creepy Old Geezer; V2: Misfortune Is a Funny Thing; Interlude: The Demon Lord's Soliloquy; 3: Liquor Is the Best Medicine; Interlude: The Servant's Dream; R3: The Old Man Challenges the Earth Dragons; Conversation: Meeting of the Parallel Minds #3 — The Three Earth Dragon Brothers; Interlude: The Foul-Mouthed Girl and the Too-Friendly Boy Hero; V3: The Man Behind the Misfortune; Interlude: The Demon Lord and Immortality; R4: The Old Man Meets an Administrator; Conversation: Meeting of the Parallel Minds #4 — OMGüli-güli!; Special Chapter: The Boy Hero's Struggle; R5: The Old Man Challenges the Spiders; 4: Baby Spider Beatdown; R6: The Old Man Takes an Apprentice; Interlude: The Pontiff's Decision; 5: Spiders of the Same Stripe; V4: Leaving Misfortune Behind; Report on the Nightmare of the Labyrinth Part 2
7	October 10, 2017	978-4-04-072482-9	December 3, 2019	978-1-9753-0199-6
1: Transcontinental Journey Progress Report; 2: Attack on the Ant Hole; 3: Ancient Ruins Discovered!; 4: Anti-Tank Battle!; 5: Unidentified Flying Objects Always Appear Out of Nowhere; 6: Live Broadcast from the Leaders' Meeting; 7: Anti-UFO Battle Strategy; Interlude: The Vampire Mistress and Her Servant Discuss Machinery; 8: Sky Battle! Fantasy vs Sci-Fi; Interlude: The Vampire Mistress and Her Servant Discuss MA Energy; 9: The Enemy Is Everywhere!; Interlude: The Vampire Mistress and Her Servant Discuss Potimas; 10: Restraint; Special Chapter: The Struggle of the Pontiff's Ground Forces; 11: UFO Infiltration Mission; Special Chapter: The Black Dragon's Space Battle; 12: The Bomb Squad's Explosive Progress; 13: Final Boss Walk-Through; 14: Unidentified Flying Objects Are the Vehicles of Gods; Final Chapter: The Eternal Child's Soliloquy
8	March 10, 2018	978-4-04-072483-6	March 31, 2020	978-1-9753-0955-8
The Ogre's Wail; 1: I'm Weak; O1: The Ogre's Origin; 2: I'm a Shut-In; Interlude: A Certain Adventurer's Ogre Hunt; O2: The Ogre's Magic Swords; R1: The Old Man in Mourning; 3: I'm Stuffed; V1: A Chance Encounter with a Nemesis; R2: The Old Man Fights an Ogre; O3: The Ogre Pursued; Interlude: The Pontiff and the Shadow Agents; Interlude: A Certain Adventurer's Next Steps; 4: I'm Hitting the Road; Interlude: Teacher; O4: The Ogre Worn Down; 5: I'm Mountain Climbing; O5: The Ogre and the Ice Dragon; 6: I'm Lost; Interlude: The Notes of Buirimus the Summoner; Interlude: The Demon Lord and the Ice Dragon; 7 I'm in a Bind; V2: A New Nemesis; The Ogre's Roar
9	July 10, 2018	978-4-04-072792-9	September 1, 2020	978-1-9753-1035-6
Evil Gods Don't Smile; 1: Arrival in the Demon Realm; Interlude: The Veteran Demon's Secret Feud; X1: The Former Sword-King Reigar; 2: Arrival at the Demon Lord's Castle; Interlude: The Old Butler's Frightful Experience; 3: Arrival of the Hooligan; Interlude: The Demon Duke's Distress; X2: Administrator Güliedistodiez; 4: Arrival in Heaven; Interlude: The Vampire Princess's Midnight Lesson; 5: Arrival at the Great Elroe Labyrinth; X3: Ice Dragon Nia; 6: Arrival at Mr. Oni's Place; O: Wrath; 7: Arrival in Japan; Evil Gods Don't Laugh; Evil Elves Do Sneer
10	January 10, 2019	978-4-04-072794-3	November 17, 2020	978-1-9753-1037-0
Prologue: Thus a Goddess Was Born; 1: Let's Set a Goal; 2: Let's Make Preparations; Interlude: The Slacker Demon Lord; 3: Let's Take Action; O: I'll Do What I Can; 4: Let's Bring the Pain; Special Chapter: The Elf Cackles; 5: Let's Observe a Meeting; Interlude: Brothers; Interlude: The Elder Demon Admits Defeat; 6: Let's File a Complaint; Interlude: The Vampire Servant's Annihilation; Interlude: Asaka and Kunihiko; 7: Let's Make a Threat; Interlude: A Teacher Wants Only What Is Best for Her Students; 8: Let's Wrap Things Up; Epilogue: Thus an Evil God Is Born
11	July 10, 2019	978-4-04-072795-0	March 23, 2021	978-1-9753-1038-7
J1: Julius, Age 11 — Beginnings; Sophia's Diary: 1; J2: Julius, Age 12 — First Expedition; Special Chapter: The Empire Veteran and the Commander; Sophia's Diary: 2; J3: Julius, Age 12 — Surprise Attack; Special Chapter: The Saint and the Empire Veteran; Sophia's Diary: 3; J4: Julius, Age 12 — Showdown; Special Chapter: The Former Thief and the Adventurer; Sophia's Diary: 4; J5: Julius, Age 13 — Machinations; Special Chapter: The Empire Veteran's Final Hours; Interlude: The Elf Despises Wasting Time; Sophia's Diary: 5; J6: Julius, Age 13 — Life and Death; Interlude: The Pontiff and the Reincarnation Spy; Sophia's Diary: 6; J7: Julius, Age 13 — Progress; Sophia's Diary: 7; J8: Julius, Age 14 — Youth; Sophia's Diary: 8; J9: Julius, Age 15 — Partner; Sophia's Diary: 9; J10: Julius, Age 16 — Friends; Interlude: An Unopposable Force; Sophia's Diary: 10; J11: Julius, Age 17 — Accomplishments; J12: Julius, Age 21 — Family
12	January 10, 2020	978-4-04-072795-0	July 20, 2021	978-1-9753-2182-6
Observations by Future Historians: Prologue; White 1; Sanatoria; Huey; Ronandt; Kunihiko; Asaka; Aurel; Merazophis; Phelmina; Wald; Sophia; Wrath; Hawkin; Agner; Jeskan; Bloe; Balto; Yaana; Julius; White 2; Observations by Future Historians: Epilogue
13	July 10, 2020	978-4-04-073699-0	January 18, 2022	978-1-9753-3985-2
1: Exterminating Monsters for a Living; 2: Dealing with the Hero for a Living; V1: Working for the Mastermind; Conversation: The Elf's Tragedy; 3: Overthrowing a Kingdom for a Living; 4: Negotiating with Bigwigs for a Living; Special Chapter: The Path of the Oni; 5: Doing Traffic Control and Executions for a Living; Interlude: The Pontiff and the Administrator Share a Drink; 6: Watching Over the Hero's Party for a Living; Interlude: The Hero's Sister, the Evil God's Puppet, and the Hunting Dog; 7: Summing Things Up and Planning What Comes Next for a Living; Special Chapter: A Grandma Admires Her Progeny's Hard Work; 8: Picking a Fight with the System for a Living; Interlude: ???; Final Chapter: Destroying the Elves for a Living
EX (Note: A collection of extra material such as visual settings and author content. More than 30 character designs by Kiryuji and 5 color illustrations drawn by Kiryuji. The skills of various reincarnated characters are also presented.)	December 10, 2020	978-4-04-073564-1	March 24, 2026	979-8-8554-1053-2
14	January 9, 2021	978-4-04-073926-7	June 21, 2022	978-1-9753-4175-6
L1: The Lord Who Had No Name; 1: Before the Battle; B1: Reminisce — First Meeting; Interlude: Potimas's Beginning; 2: The Starting Bell of the Final Battle; L2: The Lord Who Was Once a Lab Rat; Interlude: Potimas's Experiments; B2: Ruminate — The Lost Angel and the Dragon; 3: Showdown — Annihilation; L3: The Lord Who Had Friends; B3: Ruminate — Blocked by The Demon Lord of the Business World; Interlude: Potimas and Conjuring; 4: Showdown — Spider vs Robot; L4: The Lord Learns a Lesson; B4: Ruminate — Vampires; Interlude: Potimas and Vampires; 5: Showdown — Spider vs Mega-Robot; L5: The Lord Looks On; B5: Ruminate — MA Energy; Interlude: Potimas and the Popularization of MA Energy; 6: Showdown — Chance Meeting; Interlude: The Old Man and the Witchy Little Ladies; L6: The Lord, Alone; B6: Ruminate — Ragnarok; Interlude: The President's Decision; Interlude: Potimas and the God's Sacrifice; 7: Showdown — Countless Spider Eyes; L7: The Lord, Avenged; B7: Ruminate — Thus History Moves Again; 8: End of Battle — She Who Walks with the Lord
15	December 10, 2021	978-4-04-074354-7	November 22, 2022	978-1-9753-5216-5
1: A New Dawn; S1: Waking to a New World; 2: The World Is Terribly Cruel; S2: The Value of a Life; 3: If You’re Not Strong Enough, You’d Better Get Groveling; S3: There’s No Point Dwelling on Past Misfortunes; 4: Friends; Interlude: Kunihiko Tagawa; Interlude: Kengo Natsume; Interlude: Yuri; 5: World Quest; S4: Change of Scenery; Interlude: Katia; Special Chapter: The Demon Lord Left Behind; S5: An Ever-Changing World; Interlude: Dustin; Special Chapter: The Demon Lord Makes Her Move; Interlude: Speeches from Each Side; Epilogue & Prologue
16	January 8, 2022	978-4-04-074356-1	June 20, 2023	978-1-9753-5218-9
Ariel 1; White 1; Shun 1; Balto; Sophia; Kusama; Phelmina; Merazophis; Kunihiko; Asaka; Wrath; Filimøs; Shun 2; Ariel 2; Dustin; Hyrince; Ronandt; Fei; Shun 3; Dark Dragon Reise; Ariel 3; White 2; Everyone’s Ever After; Epilogue
EX2	February 10, 2023	978-4-04-074852-8	July 14, 2026	979-8-8554-1055-6

=== Manga ===
Asahiro Kakashi launched a manga adaptation of the web novels on the Kadokawa Shoten's Young Ace Up manga website on December 22, 2015. A spin-off manga, So I'm a Spider, So What? The Daily Lives of the Kumoko Sisters, illustrated by Gratin Tori, was published on Young Ace Up from July 18, 2019, to December 8, 2022, and collected into six volumes. Both manga are also licensed by Yen Press.

No.	Original release date	Original ISBN	English release date	English ISBN
1	July 9, 2016	978-4-04-104551-0	December 19, 2017	978-0-316-41419-7
2	December 3, 2016	978-4-04-104885-6	April 10, 2018	978-0-316-52109-3
3	June 9, 2017	978-4-04-105646-2	July 24, 2018	978-1-9753-5336-0
4	December 29, 2017	978-4-04-106395-8	October 30, 2018	978-1-9753-0209-2
5	July 10, 2018	978-4-04-107058-1	March 19, 2019	978-1-9753-0350-1
6	January 10, 2019	978-4-04-107061-1	August 6, 2019	978-1-9753-5826-6
7	July 10, 2019	978-4-04-107059-8	March 24, 2020	978-1-9753-9956-6
8	March 3, 2020	978-4-04-108936-1	August 18, 2020	978-1-9753-1555-9
9	October 10, 2020	978-4-04-109922-3	April 20, 2021	978-1-9753-2423-0
10	April 9, 2021	978-4-04-109923-0	December 21, 2021	978-1-9753-3983-8
11	November 9, 2021	978-4-04-112021-7	August 23, 2022	978-1-9753-4976-9
12	October 7, 2022	978-4-04-112966-1	June 20, 2023	978-1-9753-6934-7
13	July 10, 2023	978-4-04-113909-7	June 18, 2024	978-1-9753-9470-7
14	April 9, 2024	978-4-04-114829-7	February 18, 2025	979-8-8554-1255-0
15	March 10, 2025	978-4-04-115941-5	April 28, 2026	979-8-8554-2777-6
16	February 10, 2026	978-4-04-117005-2	—	—

=== Anime ===
It was reported on July 6, 2018, that the series would receive an anime adaptation, according to an early look at the wraparound jacket band on the fifth volume of the manga adaptation. The report was confirmed at Kadokawa's booth at Anime Expo later that day, and it was announced that the adaptation would be a television series. Originally set to premiere in 2020, it was rescheduled to premiere in January 2021 due to the COVID-19 pandemic. The two-cour (24 episode) series was animated by Millepensee and directed by Shin Itagaki, with Okina Baba and Yūichirō Momose overseeing the series' scripts, and Kii Tanaka designing the characters, Shūji Katayama composing the series' music, and Jōtarō Ishigami producing the series. The series aired from January 8 to July 3, 2021, on AT-X and other channels. The first opening theme song is "keep weaving your spider way" performed by Riko Azuna, while the first ending theme song is "Do Your Best! Kumoko-san's Theme" (がんばれ！蜘蛛子さんのテーマ, Ganbare! Kumoko-san no Tēma) performed by I (Aoi Yūki). The second opening theme is "Bursty Greedy Spider" performed by Konomi Suzuki, while the second ending theme is "Reality Convex Hierarchy" (現実凸撃ヒエラルキー, Genjitsu Totsugeki Hierarchy) by Yūki. It is streamed by Crunchyroll outside Asia. Medialink has licensed the series in Southeast Asia and South Asia, and is streaming it on their Ani-One YouTube channel and Bilibili. The final episode was delayed due to production issues and aired one week later on July 3, 2021.

No.	Title (Note: All English titles are taken from Crunchyroll.)	Directed by	Written by	Original release date
Part 1
1	"Reincarnation, in Another World?"; Transliteration: "Tensei, Isekai?" (Japanese: 転生、異世界？)	Shingo Tanabe	Yūichirō Momose	January 8, 2021
During what seemed to be an ordinary day, a mysterious explosion occurs and kills an entire high school class. One of the classmates wakes up to find she has been reincarnated in another world as a weak "Nameless" spider-type monster. Quickly escaping from her cannibalistic mother and siblings, she realizes this world functions under RPG logic, only to end up wasting all her skill points on a useless <Appraisal> skill. Wandering the labyrinth for a while, she finds herself increasingly hungry until she finally resorts to cannibalizing the corpse of one of her siblings, which causes her to unlock a mysterious <Taboo> skill, and later manages to kill a poisonous frog by trapping it in a web she made. Despite both meals tasting awful, Nameless resolves to survive in this new world. Elsewhere, it is revealed that her classmates reincarnated as well – the fourth prince of the Analeit Kingdom Shun, noblewoman Katia, Shun's pet earth dragon Fei, crown prince of the Renxandt Empire Hugo, saintess Yuri, and the class' teacher turned elf Ms. Oka – and they are all attending magic school with Shun's younger sister Sue.
2	"My House, On Fire?"; Transliteration: "Mai Hōmu, Enjō?" (Japanese: マイホーム、炎上？)	Shin'ichirō Ueda	Yūichirō Momose	January 15, 2021
Fei shares with Shun her belief that her reincarnating as a dragon was karmic punishment for bullying their classmate, Hiiro Wakaba, in her previous life. She asks Ms. Oka about her, who has been searching the world for reincarnations, but she reveals Hiiro has not been found yet, causing Fei to hope she is okay. Meanwhile, Nameless continues hunting monsters and discovers that she has a unique skill that heals her as she levels up. She proceeds to build a nest and later finds a human caught in her web, who drops a dragon egg while escaping. Nameless plans to eat it, but before she can do so more humans appear and burn down her nest to get the egg back, forcing her to flee. Depressed at how weak she is, Nameless builds a new nest and begins aggressively hunting monsters to get stronger. Before long, however, her new nest is also attacked, this time by a giant snake. After a hard-fought battle, Nameless beats the snake, causing her to reach her level cap and evolve. Back at the academy, Fei decides she might as well try to get stronger herself.
3	"Earth Wyrm (Dragon), Bad News?"; Transliteration: "Chiryū (Ryū), Yabai?" (Japanese: 地竜（龍）、ヤバい？)	Shingo Tanabe	Mitsutaka Hirota	January 22, 2021
After evolving, Nameless is suddenly attacked by a group of humans and while fleeing from them accidentally falls down a hole. At the Academy, Shun's class is having magic practice. However, Hugo causes a scene in an attempt to stand out. The class is then suddenly attacked by an earth dragon, which kills the teacher. Hugo arrogantly tries to defeat it alone, only to get instantly knocked out. Emulating his older brother, the <Hero> Julius, Shun attacks it with the other reincarnates and manages to kill it. However, afterward, Shun is horrified to learn Fei gained the title <Kin Eater>, meaning the dragon was probably her parent, while Hugo is infuriated as Shun is celebrated as a hero. Back with Nameless, she now finds herself in the dungeon's lower stratum, filled with monsters that utterly outmatch her. However, she then crosses paths with a high-level earth dragon named Araba, who easily kills them. Nameless tries to hide, but Araba notices her, leaving her at the dragon's mercy.
4	"Monkey, Wha—?"; Transliteration: "Saru, Hoā?" (Japanese: 猿、ホアー？)	Shin'ichirō Ueda	Yūichirō Momose	January 29, 2021
Fortunately for Nameless, Araba does not consider her worth its attention and leaves. Finding herself stuck in the lower stratum, she begins exploring whilst constantly having to hide as every creature down here is much stronger than her. She eventually finds herself starving and resorts to eating the only species weaker than her: grubs so poisonous eating them almost kills her. Eventually, she starts to level up again and manages to defeat several weak monsters. However, she makes a huge mistake when she kills a monkey monster, which prompts its entire family to attack her in retribution. Finding herself trapped, she is forced to fight the horde. Following a prolonged battle, which she only survived thanks to the skill that heals her upon leveling up, Nameless stands victorious. Having defeated the monkeys, Nameless finds what seems to be the path back to the upper stratum, but instead finds herself in the middle stratum; a lava level.
5	"Does Catfish, Taste Good?"; Transliteration: "Namazutte, Oishii?" (Japanese: なまずって、おいしい？)	Shingo Tanabe	Mitsutaka Hirota	February 5, 2021
Nameless is at a disadvantage against the new monsters as they are all able to burn her webs. Finding a safe area she evolves into a Small Poison Taratect for the more potent venom. Using skill points she also purchases the ability Pride, as it allows her to level up faster but also unlocks unholy and dark magic abilities she is unsure about. At the academy, Shun is impressed with Fei's progress as she has evolved several times and they are both more popular after the defeat of the Earth-Dragon. Fei shows concern over Yuri who is becoming increasingly fanatical in her religious beliefs and demands Shun tell her if he ever comes across someone with the Taboo skill as they are the unholiest of sinners and should be eliminated. Shun is surprised that, as a Hero, his brother Julius is under the patronage of the Word of God Church. Nameless is frustrated she cannot use the magical abilities she keeps unlocking. Returning to the lava lake she comes across giant catfish monsters and realizes she can kill them by tricking them into swallowing balls of her poison. She also takes an interest in an ability she has not yet unlocked, Ruler of Pride. Nearby, Julius and his team approach the lava lake.
6	"The Hero, and the Demon Lord?"; Transliteration: "Yūsha to, Maō?" (Japanese: 勇者と、魔王？)	Shin'ichirō Ueda	Yūichirō Momose	February 12, 2021
Julius reveals they are hunting a spider monster. Nameless realizes one of her magic skills allows her to see a few seconds into the future and successfully defeats a giant eel, later using the eel's corpse as a makeshift shelter so she can evolve into a <Zoa Ele> spider with higher combat and stealth, glossing over the fact that humans consider Zoa Ele's to be harbingers of misfortune. After evolving, she is happy to find her front legs are now as sharp as knives and her body has generated armor plates. She also purchases the <Perseverance> skill that makes her more likely to survive with low health, though it also increases her Taboo skill. She also becomes able to use <Detection> to better sense her surroundings. Dual Perception also gives her two distinct minds so she can multitask more efficiently and literally talk to herself. Julius and his team are attacked by three Greater Taratects and an even higher-level Taratect, the Nightmare's Vestige. Julius kills the Taratects and the Vestige with his team, but the hero cannot help but feel that the Vestige was actually afraid of something, which made it stop fighting. Elsewhere, a <Demon Lord> is revealed to have been watching the Vestige, which had betrayed her and needed punishing. Shun's popularity grows due to Julius' victory, making Hugo even more jealous.
7	"Springtime, for Princes?"; Transliteration: "Ōji-tachi, Seishun Suru?" (Japanese: 王子たち、青春する？)	Shingo Tanabe	Mitsutaka Hirota	February 19, 2021
Shun, Fei, and Katia talk about their classmates with Ms. Oka, who reveals that, excluding the six at the academy, eleven have been taken into custody by the elves, two more have just been found, four have been confirmed dead, and three are still missing. During an excursion to the mountains, Shun is attacked by Hugo, who reveals he intends to kill all the students and blame it on a monster attack. However, in the end, Ms. Oka intervenes and defeats Hugo before using an unknown skill to strip him of his abilities. Meanwhile, Nameless is satisfied with her progress but comments her disappointment at there being no evolution for her maxed-out Appraisal skill. Just then, she receives a message that a person called Administrator D received her complaint and crafted a <Wisdom> skill for her. However, this leaves Nameless terrified, as it implies there is a god-like being watching her every move. Back at the academy, Hugo vows vengeance against Shun and Ms. Oka when he is approached by a girl claiming to be one of the missing reincarnations, who offers her assistance.
8	"Am I, Dead?"; Transliteration: "Watashi, Shisu?" (Japanese: 私、死す？)	Shin'ichirō Ueda	Yūichirō Momose	February 26, 2021
As they are both princes, Hugo's attempt to kill Shun is covered up so it does not start a war between their two kingdoms. Shun reminisces about his life in Japan when they were all good friends when Hugo was egotistical but harmless. He also remembers the class loner, Hiiro, being bullied by Fei. They confront Oka about her refusing to discuss the dead or missing reincarnations and ask about Hiiro. Nameless learns her second mind has been spending time learning magical theory, allowing her to begin using actual magic. While arguing with her second self, her <Dual Perception> levels up again, granting her three minds instead of two, and decides her third mind will focus exclusively on learning magic while she and her second mind focus on staying alive and leveling up. She is attacked by an injured Fire Dragon who is still stronger and faster than her. Attempting to poison it, she crafts a magic poison bomb, but before she can shoot it into the dragon's mouth, it is blown away by a fireball, though the rapid communication she carries out with her three minds unlocks the fourth mind. Trapped and unable to dodge, the dragon unleashes a giant fireball at her. Ms. Oka informs Shun that Hiiro is dead.
9	"I Can't Speak, Isekai?"; Transliteration: "Ai Kyanto Supīku, Isekaigo?" (Japanese: アイキャントスピーク、イセカイゴ？)	Shingo Tanabe	Mitsutaka Hirota	March 5, 2021
Julius visits the Academy to tell Shun and Sue the Demons are mobilizing for war and he is being sent to the front lines. Meanwhile, it is revealed that the Nameless that dragon killed was an illusion. With help from all four of her minds, she then successfully cast <Abyss Magic> to kill the dragon. However, she is then confronted by a mysterious man with administrative privileges who sensed the dragon's death. As they fail to communicate due to a language barrier, a smartphone suddenly appears out of nowhere. Immediately, Administrator D calls the smartphone, addressing Nameless as "little spider". The mysterious man picks up the phone, and converses with D in his language before leaving without the phone. To Nameless, D says that she is an evil goddess who has been watching Nameless, and makes the phone disappear before Nameless can ask further questions. In the Demon Realm, the Demon Lord holds council with her generals and declares war on humanity. Back at the academy, Shun suddenly unlocks the <Hero> title, which can only mean one thing: Julius has been killed. Note: It is revealed in this episode that Nameless's storyline takes place fifteen years before the other classmates'.
10	"Who Is This, Geezer?"; Transliteration: "Kono Jijī, Dare?" (Japanese: このじじい、誰？)	Shin'ichirō Ueda	Mitsutaka Hirota	March 12, 2021
While wandering around, wondering about D, Nameless finds a route back to the upper-stratum. In the present, Shun meets with the royal family to discuss his new role, and it is decided that he must quit the academy to take over as the Hero immediately. Elsewhere, at the remains of the battlefield between the humans and demons, the magician Ronandt, Julius' former magic tutor, is angered over the loss of life and ends up recounting how, 15 years ago, he and a team of soldiers entered a labyrinth to investigate a monster outbreak. They discovered that the cause was a Taratect scaring away all the other monsters, and a battle ensued which left Ronandt and fellow mage Buirimus as the sole survivors. Having received news that a Queen Teratect appeared on a battlefield, Ronandt suspects it might be connected to that Zoe Ela. Back in the past, it is revealed that the Taratect was, in fact, Nameless, who uses the gathered EXP to evolve yet again. However, this also causes her Taboo skill to reach max level, and she passes out.
11	"Next Time, Is the Big Battle?"; Transliteration: "Jikai, Kessen?" (Japanese: 次回、決戦？)	Shingo Tanabe	Yūichirō Momose	March 19, 2021
As Shun feels uneasy about replacing Julius as the Hero, Fei convinces him to form a pact with her, enabling him to summon her if he is in danger. However, this causes Fei to evolve and revert into an egg while the process is underway. Shun later meets with Hyrince, the only survivor of Julius' party, and he explains they were all killed by a mysterious girl in white, with him only surviving because Julius gave him his own revival item. Shun does not blame Hyrince and takes him as a new teammate. Back in the past, due to Taboo reaching level 10, Nameless starts getting visions that the world is heading toward an apocalypse but struggles to make sense of it all. Concluding she needs to get stronger and save the world, Nameless decides to challenge Araba and begins relentlessly leveling up by clearing out monsters that might get in the way. In the end, she finishes her preparations just as Araba arrives to confront her.
12	"My Battle Has, Only Just Begun?"; Transliteration: "Watashi no Tatakai wa, Kore Kara da?" (Japanese: 私の戦いは、これからだ？)	Shin'ichirō Ueda	Yūichirō Momose	March 26, 2021
Nameless and Araba find themselves evenly matched, but she is able to turn the tide in her favor by trapping the earth dragon in a web she prepared beforehand. However, Araba then uses all its saved-up skill points to acquire abilities Nameless is weak against. Finding herself increasingly cornered, Nameless briefly considers giving up but ultimately resolves to fight to the end. Just as Araba is about to finish her off, however, the earth dragon suddenly collapses. It is then revealed Nameless knew she could not win head-on, so she instead used a skill she acquired beforehand to drain Araba's stamina until it succumbed to exhaustion. Victorious, Nameless is about to deliver the killing blow when Araba stops resisting, satisfied with their battle. This angers her and she kills the dragon but is left feeling hollow. In the present, the Demon Lord reminisces about the time she fought an earth dragon while Shun vows to avenge Julius, unaware that Hugo is plotting against him. Back in the past, Nameless finally finds a way out of the labyrinth by following a tracking spell she placed on the humans from earlier.
Part 2
13	"Yay, The Outside, I'm Free?"; Transliteration: "Yattā, Soto dā Watashi wa Jiyū ...... da?" (Japanese: やったー、外だー 私は自由......だ？)	Shingo Tanabe	Yūichirō Momose	April 9, 2021
After defeating some humans guarding the labyrinth's exit, Nameless finally enters the outside world. Wanting some way to communicate with humans, she makes her new goal to evolve into an <Arachne>, a half-human/half-spider monster, when she suddenly receives a telepathic message from her mother ordering her to return to the labyrinth, which she ignores. In the present, Shun and his family meet the elven chief, Potimas, who reveals negotiations with the demons have stopped ever since the current Demon Lord's ascension and warns Shun not to trust the church. Meanwhile, at the academy, Katia and Sue worry about Shun when they are kidnapped by Hugo. Back in the past, Nameless's mother is angered by her disobedience and sends an army of spider monsters to bring her back. However, she defeats most of them with ease before teleporting the remaining ones to the middle-stratum, killing them with heat. Her mother then once again tries to control her, prompting her to send her parallel minds through their psychic link and attack her mind. Returning to the present, it's revealed Hugo is working with Shun's older half-brother Cylis.
14	"You're Rebelling? I'm, Self-Deprecating"; Transliteration: "Omae Hangyaku? Watashi, Jigyaku" (Japanese: おまえ反逆？ 私、自虐)	Shin'ichirō Ueda; Michita Shiraishi	Mitsutaka Hirota	April 16, 2021
Nameless comes across a carriage being attacked by bandits and comes to their aid. However, after defeating the attackers, she notices one of the occupants, a vampire baby named Sophia, is a fellow reincarnation. Jealous of how easy she has it, Nameless departs but then notices a group of elves planning to kidnap the baby. So she disposes of them as well. In the present, Sue suddenly kills her father, the king, and frames Shun. Cylis and Hugo then arrest him and explain that the king was going to make Shun his successor to keep him off the battlefield, so they cooperated to launch this coup d'etat. However, Shun manages to escape with help from Ms. Oka and Hyrince, his maid Anna, and brother Leston. While recuperating, however, they are attacked by a group led by Hugo's reincarnation ally, who's revealed to be Sophia, and Katia, who has been brainwashed. While they are able to free Katia, Sophia and her assailants overwhelm them until Fei, who has evolved into a huge light dragon, arrives and they all escape on her back. Afterward, Sophia telepathically informs the Demon Lord that she completed her mission.
15	"Did Mother, Send These Annoying Puppet Spiders?"; Transliteration: "Mazā, Kara no Yakkai Kumo Ningyō?" (Japanese: マザー、からの厄介蜘蛛人形？)	Shingo Tanabe	Yūichirō Momose	April 23, 2021
As Nameless's parallel minds eat way at her mother's mind, they find that they have been locked in as she suddenly makes her way out of the labyrinth to pursue Nameless herself. Finding herself completely outmatched, Nameless teleports back to her nest in the labyrinth but is ambushed by more Taratects. She tries to flee but is stopped by a Puppet Taratect - a small spider monster that operates a human-sized mannequin. Driven into a corner, she finally turns the tide by killing one and leveling up, which fully heals her, before teleporting herself and the remaining ones to the lava floor, where they die from the heat. Afterward, having reached her level-cap, Nameless evolves yet again. In the present, Ms. Oka informs Shun and the others that Hugo is planning to attack the Elf Village, so they decide to head there to stop him, except for Leston who opts to stay behind to deal with the kingdom's current situation. However, this journey will take them through the very same labyrinth that once housed Nameless.
16	"Am I Getting Ahead Of Myself?"; Transliteration: "Furaingu, Getto?" (Japanese: フライング、ゲット？)	Shin'ichirō Ueda	Mitsutaka Hirota	April 30, 2021
Following her latest evolution, Nameless discovers she now has a <Immortality> skill. She is then contacted by D, who congratulates her for being the first to reach this species and reveals why she and the other classmates were reincarnated before departing: D did it as an apology as the explosion that killed everyone was actually an attempt on her life by a previous Hero and Demon King, revealing she is one of the classmates. In the present, Shun's party has reached the labyrinth, where they recruit a guide named Basgath to lead them through it and Fei reveals she can now assume a human form. Because Hugo's imperial army is guarding the entrance, the guide sneaks them in through an undersea entrance, despite some trouble with a water dragon. Back in the past, Nameless has reached the sea where, after having her own water dragon encounter, she gets an idea. Rechallenging the Puppet Teratect, she kills it by flooding the cave with water before retreating back outside. However, just then, she is suddenly ambushed by the Demon Lord, the Origin Teratect Ariel, who immediately blasts her body to pieces.
17	"What Am I Doing?"; Transliteration: "Watashi, Nani Shiteru?" (Japanese: 私、なにしてる？)	Shingo Tanabe	Yasuhiro Nakanishi	May 7, 2021
In the Demon Realm, Ariel prepares to attack the Elf Village. Meanwhile, Shun's party camps out whilst traversing the labyrinth. Unable to sleep, Shun is told by Basgath about how he once encountered Nameless, who is now known as the "Nightmare of the Labyrinth". Finding themselves at a crossroads, with time being of the essence, the group opts to follow a short but dangerous route through the Nightmare's former home. This leads to them being attacked by an earth dragon but they are able to beat it. However, they are then confronted by a swarm of "Nightmare's vestiges", spider-type monsters said to be the Nighmare's offspring. Strangely, though, upon realizing Shun and co. are reincarnations, the creatures let them pass. The group then finally exists the labyrinth by flying through an opening on the back of Fei's dragon form. In the past, Nameless is revealed to have survived through her <Immortality> but ponders that she must tread carefully as there exists magic that can kill even immortals. Elsewhere, Ariel furiously realizes that Nameless is alive when one of her parallel minds uses her link with "mother" to attack her mind.
18	"You Guys Are Kind of Awful, Huh?"; Transliteration: "Minna, Haraguroku ne?" (Japanese: みんな、腹黒くね？)	Michita Shiraishi	Yūichirō Momose	May 14, 2021
Nameless finds herself near Sophia's hometown, which is once again being targeted by elves. In the present, Shun's party travels through that same town. While there, they learn of the animosity between the world's two dominant religions, the Word of God church and Goddess Religion, and Ms. Oka reveals Hugo has likely brainwashed the heads of the church, causing Shun to resolve that they must defeat him. Back in the past, Nameless kills the elves trying to abduct Sophia, along with anyone suspicious. This draws the attention of Potimas, who fears Ariel and the church might have realized his intentions to gather the reincarnations. The church's pontiff, Dustin, also takes notice but chooses to ignore it as he prepares for war against the Goddess Religion. The townspeople eventually become aware of Nameless as well and believe she is a Divine Beast sent by the Goddess. A mother later brings her sick child to Nameless and begs her to heal him, which she reluctantly does. However, the next day, Nameless finds that word has spread and the entire town has now lined up to be healed by her.
19	"I Guess, This Is a Class Reunion?"; Transliteration: "Hirake, Dōsōkai?" (Japanese: ひらけ、同窓会？)	Shingo Tanabe	Mitsutaka Hirota	May 21, 2021
Shun's party finally arrives at the Elf Village, where they are shockingly met by Potimas, who they thought had been killed in Hugo's coup. After a night's rest, Ms. Oka leads Shun, Fei, and Katia to the other reincarnations held at the Elf Village. However, whilst sharing a happy reunion, the others reveal that they were, in fact, kidnapped by the elves, causing Shun and co. to grow suspicious. In the past, Sophia's parents receive a demand from the neighboring country to hand over Nameless, which they cannot possibly do. Potimas then arrives, but he ultimately opts not to make a move on Sophia while Nameless is nearby. Sensing her mother is weakened enough, Nameless teleports to her to finally kill her, only to end up falling into a trap and nearly be killed. However, her Parallel Minds then return to her, transferring all the stats they stole from her mother onto her and allowing her to easily kill her before retreating. Afterward, Ariel finds mother's corpse and swears vengeance before being confronted by an earth dragon who claims it is natural for the elderly to make way for their children, only for her to attack it out of spite.
20	"This Isn't My Fault, Is It?"; Transliteration: "Watashi no Sei ja nai, yo ne?" (Japanese: 私のせいじゃない、よね？)	Shin'ichirō Ueda	Yūichirō Momose	May 28, 2021
An envoy from a neighboring kingdom appears before Nameless and declares her their property, but she just finds them annoying and walks away. She is then confronted by the same administrator she met in the labyrinth, who introduces himself as Guliedistodiez and requests her to stop attacking Ariel and interacting with humans. However, she refuses, arguing that she must interfere to prevent the apocalypse. Unfortunately, after Gulie leaves, Nameless is attacked by the envoy's guards, prompting her to kill them in self-defense. However, using the envoy's death as a casus belli, the neighboring country declares war and Nameless decides to face their army herself upon realizing what she has done. In the present, Ms. Oka wonders if she has made the right choices. It is revealed that she has a unique skill called <Student Roster> that tells her the reincarnations' place of birth, health, and how they would die, which prompted her to make a deal with Potimas to effectively imprison them in the Elf Village for their own safety. Meanwhile, Ariel's forces have secretly mixed themselves in with Hugo's army and are using them as cover as they match toward the Elf Village.
21	"So, I'm Not in This One, Am I?"; Transliteration: "Watashi, Deban naitte ka?" (Japanese: 私、出番ないってか？)	Shingo Tanabe	Yasuhiro Nakanishi	June 4, 2021
While preparing for the upcoming battle, Shun's party is joined by two more of their former classmates, Kunihiko and Asaka, and Ms. Oka tells them the Elves' theory as to why they were reincarnated: The RPG system that governs this world is controlled by beings known as administrators, who feed off the energy of people's skills, and they summoned them to develop powerful skills. She also reveals that Hugo is likely being manipulated by them whilst Sophia serves them willingly. As the group wonders what became of the two reincarnations who are still missing, the entrance to the Elf Village is attacked by one of the said classmates: Sajin, who became a church assassin. After Sajin destroys the entrance and flees, locking everyone inside, the barrier surrounding the village is suddenly destroyed, allowing Hugo's forces to attack. Ms. Oka leads the Elves' counterattack and, having learned from her skill that Hugo is destined to die here, faces him to personally end him. However, while she is able to take out a brainwashed Yuri, Hugo overpowers her with aid from Sophia. Before he can finish her off, however, she is saved by the arrival of Shun and his party.
22	"Be Forever, Me?"; Transliteration: "Watashi yo, Towa ni?" (Japanese: 私よ、永(と)遠(わ)に？)	Michita Shiraishi	Mitsutaka Hirota	June 11, 2021
In the past, Nameless joins the battle against the neighboring country, resulting in massive casualties for the enemy, when Ariel suddenly appears. It is revealed that, after killing the dragon, Ariel's soul merged with Nameless' parallel mind that had previously jumped over to her, causing her to adopt some of the latter's personality traits. However, she still wants revenge and has Guliedistodiez, who came to check on her, teleport her to Nameless' location. As they fight, Ariel uses several skills that prevent Nameless from using magic or teleporting, forcing her to rely on healing herself by leveling up using the EXP gathered from collateral damage just to stay alive. Eventually, their battle is interrupted by a young Julius, causing Ariel to stop out of fear of the secret effect of the <Hero>, which causes them to always win against the <Demon Lord>. However, Ariel is able to distract him before using Abyss magic, which can kill even immortals, to vaporize Nameless. In the present, despite his allies wanting to help, Shun insists on facing Hugo alone.
23	"My Old Friend, Why ...?"; Transliteration: "Tomo yo, Naze Omae wa ......?" (Japanese: 友よ、なぜおまえは......？)	Shingo Tanabe	Mitsutaka Hirota	June 18, 2021
As the elf village battle continues, Potimas orders the <Gloria> units to be sent into battle. Meanwhile, Shun easily defeats Hugo, and Sophia refuses to help him, revealing her affiliation with the demons and that they were only using him as a smokescreen. Hugo is furious at being manipulated, but she effortlessly knocks him aside. Shun and his party fight her, but they are similarly overpowered with ease. Fei attempts to surrender on everybody's behalf but Shun refuses to give up, believing Julius would not either. Unfortunately, they are then ambushed by reinforcements led by the last missing classmate: 8th demon army commander Wrath, who was Shun's friend in their previous lives. However, the elves then launch their counterattack using the <Gloria> units, which are revealed to be mechanical tank drones, killing all the demons except Sophia and Wrath. Elsewhere, Ariel approaches the village with the woman in white who killed Julius, when the latter suddenly decides to check on Sophia and Wrath.
24	"So I'm Still a Spider, So What?"; Transliteration: "Mada Kumo Desu ga, Nanika?" (Japanese: まだ蜘蛛ですが、なにか？)	Shin'ichirō Ueda; Shin Itagaki	Yūichirō Momose	July 3, 2021
Shun tries to stop Sophia and Wrath but is overpowered and Anna takes a lethal blow for him. Desperate, Shun revives her with a forbidden <Mercy> skill. However, this raises his <Taboo> to level 10, causing him to learn the truth of the world. Seeing an opening, Hugo strikes at Sophia but is knocked unconscious by the woman in white whom Shun and his party recognize as their classmate Hiiro Wakaba, the nameless spider. In the past, Hiiro (aka Nameless) survives Ariel's attack by transferring her consciousness into an egg she laid beforehand and hatches as a newborn. She then uses EXP she obtained from the battlefield to evolve into an <Arachne>. Meanwhile, Potimas attacks Sophia's home, kills her parents, and fatally injures the family butler, Merazophis, forcing her to turn him into a vampire. Fortunately, Hiiro arrives and engages Potimas but gets pushed into a corner due to Potimas using an anti-magic barrier, until Ariel appears and beats him, revealing he was only a mechanical copy. Ariel then calls for a truce, to which Hiiro agrees and she, Sophia, and Merazophis all agree to follow her back to Demon Territory. Potimas awakens in another clone body and vows to kill Hiiro. Back in the present, Hiiro's party moves on to defeat Potimas.

== Reception ==
The light novels and manga had a combined 1.2 million copies in print by July 2018. In 2017, the manga adaptation was ranked 18th at the third Next Manga Awards in the web category. The light novels ranked third in the tankōbon category in the Kono Light Novel ga Sugoi! 2017 rankings, and second in the 2018 rankings.

== See also ==
- Cultural depictions of spiders
