= Riku =

- Gender: Male

Origin
- Meaning: The Finnish form of "Richard"; Japanese name meaning "handsome", although other meanings are possible depending on the character(s) used in the name

Riku is both a masculine Finnish given name and a unisex Japanese given name. Notable people with the name include:

== Real people ==
=== Finnish ===
- Riku Hahl (born 1980), Finnish NHL hockey player
- Riku Heini (born 1990), Finnish footballer for FC Lahti
- Riku Helenius (born 1988), Finnish NHL hockey player
- Riku Immonen (born 1974), Finnish professional Muay Thai kickboxer and active muay thai coach
- Riku Jääskä (born 1998), Finnish footballer
- Riku Kiri (born 1963), Finnish sportsman
- Riku Korhonen (born 1972), Finnish writer and journalist
- Riku Korhonen (gymnast) (1883–1932), Finnish gymnast
- Riku Nieminen (born 1986) Finnish actor and dancer
- Riku Paularinne (born 1988), Finnish football coach
- Riku Pitkänen (born 1991), Finnish former ice hockey forward
- Riku Pöytäkivi (born 1993), Finnish swimmer
- Riku Rantala (born 1974), Finnish journalist and presenter
- Riku Riski (born 1989), Finnish footballer
- Riku Selander (born 1994), Finnish footballer
- Riku Sjöroos (born 1995), Finnish footballer
- Riku Toivo (born 1989), Finnish professional ice hockey player

=== Japanese ===
- Riku Anpo (安保 璃紅; born 1997), Japanese kickboxer
- Riku Danzaki (檀崎 竜孔; born 2000), Japanese footballer
- Riku Fukashiro (深代 陸; born 2000), Japanese professional footballer
- Riku Furuyado (古宿 理久, born 2001), Japanese footballer
- Riku Handa (半田 陸; born 2002), Japanese footballer
- Riku Hashimoto (橋本 陸; born 1998), Japanese footballer
- Riku Hatano (秦野 陸; born 2001), Japanese badminton player
- Riku Hirosue (廣末 陸; born 1998), Japanese football player
- Riku Iijima (飯島 陸; born 1999), Japanese footballer
- Riku Kamigaki (神垣 陸; born 1998), Japanese footballer
- Riku Kano (加納 陸; born 1997), Japanese professional boxer
- Riku Kazushima (数島 大陸; born 2002), Japanese kickboxer
- Riku Kobayashi (小林 里駆; born 2001), Japanese footballer
- Riku Matsuda (松田 陸; born 1991), Japanese professional footballer
- Riku Matsuda (松田 陸; born 1999), Japanese footballer
- Riku Misora (海空 りく; born 1987), Japanese novelist
- Riku Miura (三浦 璃来; born 2001), Japanese figure skater
- Riku Morioka (森岡 陸; born 1998), Japanese footballer
- Riku Morisaka (森坂 陸; born 1998), Japanese kickboxer
- Riku Nakayama (中山 陸; born 2001), Japanese footballer
- Riku Nozawa (野澤 陸; born 1998), Japanese footballer
- Riku Ochiai (落合 陸; born 1999), Japanese footballer
- Riku Oe (大江 梨久; born 2002), Japanese member from NiziU
- Riku Onda (恩田 陸; born 1964), Japanese writer
- Riku Saga (嵯峨 理久; born 1998), Japanese footballer
- Riku Sanjo (三条 陸; born 1964), Japanese manga artist
- Riku Tanaka (田中 陸; born 1999), Japanese footballer
- Riku Tsuchiya (土屋 陸; born 1997), Japanese speed skater
- Riku Watanabe (渡邉 陸; born 2000), Japanese professional baseball catcher
- Riku Yamada (山田 陸; born 1998), Japanese footballer
- Riku Yamane (山根 陸; born 2003), Japanese footballer
- Riku Yanagisawa (栁澤 李空; born 2001), Japanese curler

=== Other nationalities ===
- Riku Lätti (born 1973), South African singer, songwriter and writer
- Riku Morgan, Nigerian Airforce officer

== Fictional characters ==
- Riku, a character in 47 Ronin
- Riku (Kingdom Hearts), a character in Kingdom Hearts
- Riku, a character in Kino's Journey
- Riku, a character in Xenoblade Chronicles 3
- Riku, a character in Yashahime
- Riku Ageha, a character in Star-Myu
- Riku Asakura, a character in Ultraman Geed
- Riku Dola, a character in No Game No Life: Zero
- Riku Harada, a character in D.N.Angel
- Riku Kitazawa, a character in Gravitation
- Riku Mikami, a character in Gundam Build Divers
- Riku Miyagusuku, a character in Blood+
- Riku Nanase, a character in IDOLiSH7
- Riku Tanaka, a character in Years and Years
- Riku Utomiya, a character in Classroom of the Elite
- Rikku, a character in Final Fantasy X

== See also ==
- Rinku (disambiguation)
- Rick (disambiguation)
