= Pitkänen =

Pitkänen is a Finnish surname. Notable people with the surname include:

- Ilmari Pitkänen, (1880–1927), Finnish writer
- Ilmari Pitkänen (born 1990), Finnish ice hockey player
- Joni Pitkänen (born 1983), Finnish ice hockey player
- Matti Pitkänen (born 1951), Finnish cross-country skier
- Miikka Pitkänen (born 1996), Finnish ice hockey player
- Pauli Pitkänen (1911–1941), Finnish cross-country skier
- Riku Pitkänen (born 1991), Finnish ice hockey player
- Päsi Pitkänen (born 1984) Finnish artist
- Toimi Pitkänen (1928–2016), Finnish rower
