= The Dreaming Boy Is a Realist =

Japanese light novel series

- First light novel volume cover, featuring Aika Natsukawa (left) and Wataru Sajō (right)

夢見る男子は現実主義者 (Yumemiru Danshi wa Genjitsushugisha)
- Genre: Romantic comedy
- Novel series
- Written by: Okemaru
- Published by: Shōsetsuka ni Narō
- Original run: December 7, 2018 – present
- Light novel
- Written by: Okemaru
- Illustrated by: Saba Mizore
- Published by: Hobby Japan
- English publisher: Monogatari Novels
- Imprint: HJ Bunko
- Original run: June 1, 2020 – present
- Volumes: 8
- Manga
- Written by: Okemaru
- Illustrated by: Popuri Yoshikita
- Published by: Kadokawa Shoten
- Magazine: Shōnen Ace Plus
- Original run: March 26, 2021 – March 18, 2024
- Volumes: 5
- Anime television series
- Directed by: Kazuomi Koga
- Written by: Michiko Yokote
- Music by: Ryōhei Sataka
- Studio: Studio Gokumi; AXsiZ
- Licensed by: Sentai Filmworks: SA/SEA: Medialink
- Original network: TV Tokyo, BS NTV, MBS, AT-X
- Original run: July 4, 2023 – September 19, 2023
- Episodes: 12
- icon

The Dreaming Boy Is a Realist (夢見る男子は現実主義者, Yumemiru Danshi wa Genjitsushugisha) is a Japanese light novel series written by Okemaru and illustrated by Saba Mizore. It was initially serialized as a web novel on the user-generated novel publishing website Shōsetsuka ni Narō in December 2018. It was later acquired by Hobby Japan, who began publishing it as a light novel in June 2020 under their HJ Bunko light novel imprint. A manga adaptation illustrated by Popuri Yoshikita was serialized on Kadokawa Shoten's Shōnen Ace Plus website from March 2021 to March 2024. An anime television series adaptation produced by Studio Gokumi and AXsiZ aired from July to September 2023.

== Synopsis ==
Wataru Sajō has been continually rejected by Aika Natsukawa, a beautiful girl in his class. After getting hit by an errant soccer ball, he suddenly has a change in personality, coming to the conclusion that he is not worthy of her and beginning to distance himself from her. However, Aika mistakenly thinks he now dislikes her, and she starts to get involved with him. This is the start of a romantic comedy when two classmates struggle to convey their feelings, especially when other girls begin to take notice of Wataru.

== Characters ==
=== Main characters ===
Wataru Sajō (佐城 渉, Sajō Wataru)
Voiced by: Naoya Miyase (Japanese); Gabriel Regojo (English)
The main protagonist who passionately approaches his classmate, Aika Natsukawa. After getting hit by an errant soccer ball, he has a change in personality and tries to distance himself from her. During summer vacation, he starts working part-time at a bookstore.
Aika Natsukawa (夏川 愛華, Natsukawa Aika)
Voiced by: Akiho Suzumoto (Japanese); Alyssa Marek (English)
The female lead, a beautiful girl in her class. She went to the same middle school as Wataru and rejected his advances since then. She is bewildered by Wataru's sudden change in attitude, which left her a feeling of confusion.
Kei Ashida (芦田 圭, Ashida Kei)
Voiced by: Yumiri Hanamori (Japanese); Chaney Moore (English)
Aika's best friend. She is an upbeat, cheerful girl who joins the Volleyball Club.
Kaede Sajō (佐城 楓, Sajō Kaede)
Voiced by: Mikako Komatsu (Japanese); Luci Christian (English)
Wataru's older sister. She is the Vice President of the Student Council of Kōetsu High School.
Rin Shinomiya (四ノ宮 凛, Shinomiya Rin)
Voiced by: Kaori Ishihara (Japanese); Elissa Cuellar (English)
Kaede's best friend. She is level-headed and the Moral Public Committee President of Kōetsu High School.
Mina Ichinose (一ノ瀬 深那, Ichinose Mina)
Voiced by: Iori Saeki (Japanese); Emi Lo (English)
Wataru's classmate and junior at part-time job. She is a literature buff with a quiet personality. She later develops feelings for Wataru.
Fuka Sasaki (笹木 風香, Sasaki Fūka)
Voiced by: Minami Kurisaka (Japanese); Katelyn Barr (English)
A mature junior high school girl who met Wataru after a certain incident. She has feelings for Wataru, which he is unaware of.

=== Supporting characters ===
Rena Aizawa (藍沢レナ, Aizawa Rena)
Voiced by: Sara Matsumoto (Japanese); Hilary Haag (English)
A cute girl who approached Wataru for ulterior motives.
Yuyu Inatomi (稲富ゆゆ, Inatomi Yuyu)
Voiced by: Yukari Anzai (Japanese); Kelley Peters (English)
A cute member of the Moral Public Committee of Kōetsu High School.
Takurō Yamazaki (山崎拓郎, Yamazaki Takurō)
Voiced by: Kenta Hosoda (Japanese); Blake Shepard (English)
A classmate of Wataru and Aika, and a Basketball Club member.
Kazuki Arimura (有村和樹, Arimura Kazuki)
Voiced by: Kanda Yu (Japanese); Bobby Haworth (English)
The ex-boyfriend of Rena and a student of Class 2-B.
Megumi Otsuki (大槻めぐみ, Ōtsuki Megumi)
Voiced by: Seira Ryū (Japanese); Patricia Duran (English)
The homeroom teacher of class 1-C, the class of Wataru and Aika. The nickname first and only revealed in the web novel version chapter 5.
Hayato Yūki (結城颯斗, Yūki Hayato)
Voiced by: Toshiyuki Someya (Japanese); Scott Gibbs (English)
The Student Council President of Kōetsu High School, and a member of K4.
Renji Hanawa (花輪蓮二, Hanawa Renji)
Voiced by: Daishi Kajita (Japanese); James Marlor (English)
The Student Council member, and a member of K4.
Takuto Kai (甲斐拓人, Kai Takuto)
Voiced by: Arai Kōki (Japanese); Camryn Nunley (English)
The Student Council member, and a member of K4.
Takaaki Sasaki (佐々木貴明, Sasaki Takaaki)
Voiced by: Genki Muro (Japanese); Joe Daniels (English)
Wataru's classmate and a member of Soccer Club of Kōetsu High School. He has a young sister named Yuki.
Airi Natsukawa (夏川愛莉, Natsukawa Airi)
Voiced by: Anzu Haruno (Japanese); Kalin Coates (English)
Aika's beloved little sister.
Nonoka Shirai (白井乃々香, Shirai Nonoka)
Voiced by: Hikari Sonya (Japanese); Natalie Rial (English)
Aika and Mina's classmate and friend. She has crush on Takaaki.
Aoi Okamoto (岡本葵, Okamoto Aoi)
Voiced by: Okamura Haruka (Japanese); Cat Thomas (English)
Aika and Mina's classmate and friend. She also has a crush on Takaaki.
Seina Ihoshi (飯星聖奈, Iihoshi Seina)
Voiced by: Keiwa Onishi (Japanese); Star Carter (English)
The class representative of 1-C, the class of Wataru, Aika, Kei and Mina.
Yuki Sasaki (佐々木有希, Sasaki Yuki)
Voiced by: Hitomi Sasaki (Japanese); Emi Lo (English)
The younger sister of Takaaki and a middle schooler.
Arisa Koga (古賀亜里沙, Koga Arisa)
Voiced by: Ayumi Mano (Japanese); Karlii Hoch (English)
Wataru and Aika's female classmate known for her bad mouth and attitude.
Ayano Mita (三田綾乃, Mita Ayano)
Voiced by: Yūko Okui (Japanese); Kira Vincent-Davis (English)
Yuyu's childhood friend and a member of Moral Public Committee of Kōetsu High School.
Marika Shinonome-Claudine (東雲クロディーヌ茉莉花, Shinonome-Claudine Marika)
Voiced by: Karin Nanami (Japanese); Kimberly Yates (English)
The half-Japanese half-French female student, and Hayato's fiancé.
Hiyori Sonoda (園田ひより, Sonoda Hiyori)
Voiced by: Takagishi Miria (Japanese); Karlii Hoch (English)
One of Marika's friends. The character's name first revealed in the anime adaptation.
Kaoruko Isogawa (五十川薫子, Isogawa Kaoruko)
Voiced by: Hikari Sonoyama (Japanese); Christy Guidry (English)
One of Marika's friends, she is dubbed "Mobile Student Handbook" by Wataru.
Store Manager (店長, Tenchō)
Voiced by: Susumu Akagi (Japanese); Carl Masterson (English)
The owner of the second-hand bookstore, where Wataru and Mina work part-time.
Yū Ichinose (一瀬優, Ichinose Yū)
Voiced by: Masayuki Akasaka (Japanese); Cody House (English)
Mina's big brother and a member of the Moral Public Committee.
Hiroto Tabata (田端博人, Tabata Hiroto)
Voiced by: Tetsushi Niwa (Japanese); Jeran Ugokwe (English)
One of Wataru's classmates who's not part of any clubs or committees.
Yuri Hanaoka (花岡由梨, Hanaoka Yuri)
Voiced by: Emiri Iwai (Japanese); Kalin Coates (English)
Yū's girlfriend and fellow Moral Public Committee member.
Store Manager's Wife (奥さん, Oku-san)
Voiced by: Shinobu Sato (Japanese); Julie Oliver-Touchstone (English)
The store manager's wife. She is a woman who cares about others, especially her husband's employees and customers.

== Media ==
=== Light novel ===
Written by Okemaru, the series began serialization as a web novel on the user-generated novel publishing website Shōsetsuka ni Narō on December 7, 2018. As of August 2023, 210 chapters have been published. It was later acquired by Hobby Japan who began publishing it as a light novel with illustrations by Saba Mizore under their HJ Bunko imprint on June 1, 2020. As of April 2023, eight volumes have been released. The novels are licensed in English by Monogatari Novels.

No.	Original release date	Original ISBN	English release date	English ISBN
1	June 1, 2020	978-4-79-862206-4	March 3, 2026	978-8-41-272680-0
2	September 1, 2020	978-4-79-862289-7	March 3, 2026	978-8-41-274620-4
3	December 1, 2020	978-4-79-862368-9	—	—
4	May 1, 2021	978-4-79-862490-7	—	—
5	October 1, 2021	978-4-79-862622-2	—	—
6	March 1, 2022	978-4-79-862755-7	—	—
7	August 1, 2022	978-4-79-862891-2	—	—
8	April 1, 2023	978-4-79-863144-8	—	—

=== Manga ===
A manga adaptation illustrated by Popuri Yoshikita was serialized on Kadokawa Shoten's Shōnen Ace Plus website from March 26, 2021, to March 18, 2024. It was collected in five volumes from September 25, 2021, to March 26, 2024.

No.	Release date	ISBN
1	September 25, 2021	978-4-04-111932-7
2	March 25, 2022	978-4-04-112392-8
3	November 25, 2022	978-4-04-112968-5
4	June 26, 2023	978-4-04-113821-2
5	March 26, 2024	978-4-04-114663-7

=== Anime ===
An anime television series adaptation was announced on November 18, 2022. It is produced by Studio Gokumi and AXsiZ, and directed by Kazuomi Koga, with scripts written by Michiko Yokote, character designs handled by Masaru Koseki and music composed by Ryōhei Sataka. The series aired from July 4 to September 19, 2023, on TV Tokyo and other networks, including ABEMA. The opening theme song is "Paraglider" by Kaori Ishihara, while the ending theme song is "Yume wa Mijikashi Koiseyo Otome" (夢は短し恋せよ乙女; "DREAMS are fleeting, fall in LOVE, girls!") by Akiho Suzumoto. Sentai Filmworks licensed the series, and will be streaming it on Hidive. Medialink licensed the series in South, Southeast Asia and Oceania (except Australia and New Zealand) and will stream it on Ani-One Asia's YouTube channel.

No.	Title	Directed by (Note: Information is taken from the ending credits of each episode.)	Written by	Storyboarded by	Original release date
1	"I Like You. Please Go Out With Me"; Transliteration: "Suki da. Tsukiattekure" (Japanese: 好きだ。付き合ってくれ)	Kazuomi Koga	Michiko Yokote	Kazuomi Koga	July 4, 2023
Wataru is passionately in love with classmate Aika and confesses to her often despite her rejections. One day, he is nearly hit in the head with a ball and that brief moment of fear causes him to realize his own behavior; thus he decides to begin distancing himself from Aika. His abrupt personality shift shocks everyone, including Aika, who is unused to him ignoring her. A girl named Rena begins interacting with him causing Aika to act jealous. Rena has recently broken up with her boyfriend Kazuki and is trying to punish him by becoming close to Wataru. Wataru reveals he was brutally rejected by a girl in middle school and met Aika immediately after who treated him with kindness, causing him to fall in love. Having been rejected so many times, he has decided to finally leave her alone. Rena understands and reconciles with Kazuki. Aika is confused Wataru continues to avoid her and visits his house to discover why, but is not satisfied with his claim of reforming his stalker-like behavior, and when he insists they are now only classmates, she yells at him and runs home upset. The next day, Aika's friend Kei points out to a guilty Wataru that years of him hanging around prevented Aika from making many friends, and without Wataru, she is actually lonely.
2	"For You. It's a Spare Triangle Chocolate Pie"; Transliteration: "Dōzo. Supea no Sankaku Choko Pai Desu" (Japanese: どうぞ。スペアの三角チョコパイです)	Hodaka Kuramoto	Michiko Yokote	Hodaka Kuramoto	July 11, 2023
Wataru decides to distance himself even more so Aika can make more friends. Shinomiya, president of Public Morals Committee, approaches Wataru to praise an interaction he recently had with committee member Inatomi in which he apologized for scaring her due to her phobia of men. She asks his advice on boosting the committee's spirits as they are often disheartened. Wataru assures her any support she gives will suffice as being willing to offer support is more important than the support itself. Not wanting to attract trouble he falsely claims his name is Yamazaki, though this backfires when Shinomiya meets the real Yamazaki. Wataru apologizes, explaining the thought of the Morality President knowing his name might cause him some trouble. Shinomiya forgives him when Inatomi is able to thank him for his apology and promise to overcome her phobia. Aika begins to spend time with other girls. Wataru's sister Kaede coerces him into helping with her student council paperwork. Shinomiya successfully offers Inatomi her support. Aika invites her new friends to her house, then she unwittingly forbids Wataru and tries to properly invite Wataru, but loses her nerve when Shinomiya accidentally interrupts. After a frank discussion about Inatomi's attempt to conquer her phobia, Shinomiya realizes Wataru might be an expert at reading people. Wataru ends up not coming over at Aika's house, as all of Aika's friends come over to see her little sister. She secretly becomes unnerved at Wataru's distant from her.
3	"Could You Not Call the Summer Uniform, Scanty Clothing?"; Transliteration: "Natsufuku o Usugi tte Iu no Yamete Kunnai?" (Japanese: 夏服を薄着って言うのやめてくんない？)	Masateru Nomi	Saori Kanaya	Hiroyuki Shimazu	July 18, 2023
Wataru maintains his distance from Aika, even though the girls have now switched to summer uniforms and Kei tells him that Aika's now popular with the students, but he insists on keeping his distance so she could make friends, much to Kei's annoyance. Wataru notices he hasn't actually seen Kaede since the weekend. Yamazaki forces Wataru to socialize with other female classmates, including the foul-mouthed Koga. Aika jealously pulls him into an empty classroom to yell at him, but as this would mean admitting to being jealous, she leaves instead without saying anything, confusing him. Student council president Hayato reveals to Wataru that Kaede is privately very worried about his new personality and believes it might somehow be her fault for mistreating him. Wataru assures Kaede his change was his choice so there is no need to worry or change how she treats him as he is accustomed to her petty torments and finds it strange she would suddenly show concern for him. An eavesdropping Aika interrupts to force him to apologize for being cruel to Kaede, but accidentally reveals that she was worried enough to follow him, becoming embarrassed in the process, so she runs away again, confused by her own actions and feelings. Wataru is likewise confused even more, unsure what to make of Aika's actions. Feeling better, Kaede returns to normal, provokes an argument, and beats Wataru up as usual.
4	"Dark Brown? That Kind of Has a Cool Ring to It"; Transliteration: "Dāku Buraun? Nanka Kakkoii Hibiki da na" (Japanese: ダークブラウン？なんかカッコ良い響きだな)	Tatsuya Fujinaka	Saori Kanaya	Tatsuya Fujinaka	July 25, 2023
Since confronting him at the school roof, Aika continues to be confused over missing Wataru. Kei suggests since Wataru has been chasing her all this time maybe it's time Aika chased after him, but she brushes that off. Encountering the morals committee again, Wataru meets Inatomi's friend Aya, who angrily mistrusts all men, especially around Inatomi. Wataru notices Inatomi is more confident, which Shinomiya thanks him for as it was caused by her interacting with him and fearing men less. Wataru's classmate Taakaki has a crush on Aika and hopes to confess to her. Wataru acts unconcerned and plans not to interfere but has mixed feelings. Later, Aika almost asks Wataru to sit together during lunch but becomes awkward after learning he previously sat with Shinomiya. Instead, she tells him to dye his hair as he has lazily let it grow out and his roots are showing. Later, Kaede takes sadistic pleasure in helping him dye it. Wataru does badly in his exams and he realizes competing to be as good as Aika helped him study, so his usual motivation has decreased without her. Aika actually improves dramatically, which he concludes is because he stopped distracting her. Wataru regains his motivation after realizing even Taakaki scored higher than him.
5	"Should We Open It? Should We Open It? Should We Look Inside?"; Transliteration: "Akechau? Akechau? Naka Michau?" (Japanese: 開けちゃう？開けちゃう？中見ちゃう？)	Sumito Sasaki	Michiko Yokote	Hiroyuki Shimazu	August 1, 2023
The classmates are discussing their plans for summer, and then Wataru is now feeling under the weather lately. He then encounter a trio of girls who hears about Aika, and he weirded them out and they walk away. Then one rainy morning, Wataru is walking to school until he run into Aika, and then continues on until a truck is driving by and then Wataru blocks the splashing water to protect Aika. This made Wataru sick as he passes out and then ends up being taken to the infirmary by Aika and Kei, with a fever. Them back to the class, Aika couldn't help be worry about Wataru, then Rin arrives to see Sajo but realize that he is sick and leaves. Then Aika and Kei are carrying Wataru's big to visit him, Kei tries to get Aika to look inside his bag to see what's inside. Aika and Kei made it to the infirmary and see that he's having trouble sleeping, until they ran into Kaede and Rin as they went to see him. Then they next day, Aika and Kei came to visit Wataru at his house to see how he is doing, Wataru has missed messages on his phone, then Aika leaves from embarrassment, as Kei gives him a get well present. Another day, Aika sees Wataru is better as she encounters the girl Wataru come across before, Marika Shinonome-Claudine, who asks her to support for student council president, but Wataru then breaks it to her as Aika is cuter than her for stands out too much, which causes her to get angry and then away. Aika gets fluttered by Wataru's comment, and gets embarrassed and then runs away as Wataru spits out adorable. Then Wataru is then at the bookstore applying for a job for the summer.
6	"End of First Trimester Commemoration Parfait!"; Transliteration: "Ichigakki Shūryō Kinen Pafe!" (Japanese: 一学期終了記念パフェ！)	Hodaka Kuramoto	Michiko Yokote	Shinji Tanabe	August 8, 2023
7	"You Know, Female College Students Are Seriously Amazing"; Transliteration: "Joshi Daisei tte, Maji Sugee" (Japanese: 女子大生って、マジすげぇ)	Sumito Sasaki	Saori Kanaya	Tsubasa Kurashina; Kazuomi Koga	August 15, 2023
8	"Aren't You Way Too Guilty?"; Transliteration: "Giruti Suginai?" (Japanese: ギルティすぎない？)	Masateru Nomi	Saori Kanaya	Hiroyuki Ōshima	August 22, 2023
9	"Coffee. With a Ratio to Milk About 8 to 2. Sugar 1 Teaspoon, Caramel Powder Too, Please"; Transliteration: "Kōhī. Hachi: Tai Ni Kurai de Miruku ne. Satō Kosaji Ichi, Kyarameru Paudā mo Yoroshiku" (Japanese: コーヒー。8：2くらいでミルクね。砂糖小さじ1、キャラメルパウダーも宜しく)	Tatsuya Fujinaka	Saori Kanaya	Tatsuya Fujinaka	August 29, 2023
10	"Your Leg's Already at T-Minus 5 Seconds Before Blastoff!"; Transliteration: "Ashi ga Mō Hassha Go-byō Mae da kara" (Japanese: 足がもう発射5秒前だから)	Sumito Sasaki	Michiko Yokote	Hiroyuki Shimazu	September 5, 2023
11	"You Smell Like Sweat... You Must've Worked Hard"; Transliteration: "Ase no Nioi ga Suru......Ippai Hataraita nda" (Japanese: 汗のにおいがする......いっぱい働いたんだ)	Hodaka Kuramoto	Michiko Yokote	Hiroyuki Ōshima	September 12, 2023
12	"Because, You Are Where I Belong!"; Transliteration: "Datte, Anta wa Watashi no Ibasho nan Dakara" (Japanese: だって、アンタは私の居場所なんだから)	Kazuomi Koga	Michiko Yokote	Kazuomi Koga	September 19, 2023
Aika was running in the rain, until Sajō gave her shelter in the bookstore. Aika then finally invites him to her house. Kei come up too, and Sajō meets Airi, and they have played together until Sajō has been tired out from her hyper energetic nature. Then they meet Aika's mother who knows Sajō from what Aika told her about him. After they left Aika escortes Sajo home as they talk about Aika's school life would be like. She has gained new friends, and Sajō feels that if he jump in then he would be in her way again like he did in the past. But Aika confesses her love for him as they then continue to walk Sajō home, and then they become a couple. The next morning Sajō then walks to school with Aika as they start their new school year together.

== See also ==
- I Kissed My Girlfriend's Little Sister?!, another light novel series illustrated by Saba Mizore
- The Many Sides of Voice Actor Radio, another light novel series illustrated by Saba Mizore
