= Benten (Urusei Yatsura) =

Fictional character from Urusei Yatsura

- Urusei Yatsura character
- Benten, as depicted in a promotional artwork for the 2022 Urusei Yatsura TV series
- First appearance: Urusei Yatsura chapter 8: "Good Day for a Departure" (Note: いい日旅立ち, Ī Hi Tabidachi) (February 1979)
- Created by: Rumiko Takahashi
- Voiced by: Japanese: Yūko Mita (1981 TV series and film series); Shizuka Ishigami (2022 TV series); English: Elissa Cuellar (2022 TV series)

In-universe information
- Species: Fukujin

Benten (Note: Japanese: 弁天) is a fictional character appearing in the Japanese manga series Urusei Yatsura, created by Rumiko Takahashi. The character made her first appearance in the 8th chapter of the series, which was first published in Japan in Shogakukan's Weekly Shōnen Sunday magazine on February 28, 1979. In Urusei Yatsura, Benten is portrayed as a "space biker chick" who is a member of the Fukujin alien clan, as well as a childhood friend of the series' female protagonist Lum. In the anime adaptations of Urusei Yatsura, the character was voiced by Yūko Mita in the 1981 TV series as well as the film series, and by Shizuka Ishigami in the 2022 TV series while Elissa Cuellar voices her in English.

== Creation and development ==
The character of Benten was created by Rumiko Takahashi, author of the Urusei Yatsura manga series, making her first appearance in its 8th chapter, titled "Good Day for a Departure", which was first published in Shogakukan's Weekly Shōnen Sunday magazine on February 28, 1979. When creating Benten, Takahashi based the character on the Japanese Buddhist goddess Benzaiten – after whom the character was also named – which in turn led Takahashi to draw inspiration from the Japanese Seven Lucky Gods, a group that Benzaiten was said to be a part of, to portray the Fukujin, the alien clan of Benten's.

Regarding Benten's design, Takahashi intended to dress her similarly to the stereotypical appearance of outlaw motorcycle club members; the author portrayed her wearing a chainmail bikini and riding a flying motorcycle, as well as giving her a high-tech bazooka as her default weapon. In order to contrast the character with Benzaiten – the latter usually described as a wise, elegant and artistic figure – Takahashi decided to give Benten a tomboyish and violent persona. During an August 2022 interview, Japanese voice actress Shizuka Ishigami stated that Benten, despite possessing a strong, masculine personality, is "perfectly capable of understanding the appeal of being a woman".

== Appearances ==
=== In Urusei Yatsura ===
Benten is a "space biker chick" member of the Fukujin alien clan. During her early years, she grew up as childhood friends with Lum, Ran, and Oyuki, all of whom she attended elementary school with; around this time, both Benten and Lum had the habit of getting into trouble, which consequently caused Ran to get hurt and take the blame for the duo's mistakes. As a teenager, Benten is reunited with Lum when the latter returns to her home planet accompanied by her fiancé Ataru Moroboshi to participate in a traditional battle that takes place between Benten and Lum's clans every year during their planets' spring equinox. In the midst of battle, Ataru briefly falls in love with Benten and sides with her clan, much to Lum's dismay. Despite finding him annoying, Benten decided to take advantage of Ataru's affection for her by pretending to reciprocate his feelings in order to anger Lum, whose jealousy consequently causes her clan to lose the battle to Benten's.

Over the course of the series, Benten finds herself involved in various abnormal, unusual and otherworldly situations along with the rest of the manga's colorful cast of characters. These situations include: Benten challenging a trio of middle-school space girls in an attempt to retrieve from the three of them a chain that she uses as the ignition key for her flying motorcycle; her trying to prevent Ataru from crashing a party she – along with Lum, Shinobu, Sakura, Ran, Ryoko, Ryunosuke and Oyuki – were hosting in an old-fashioned sentō; and aiding Ryunosuke in stealing a gang leader's bike in order to find a lost kitten he has been looking for, only for the duo to be followed by the entire biker gang whose leader they robbed earlier.

=== In other media ===
In addition to the manga series, Benten was also featured in its 1981 anime television series adaptation, in which she was voiced by Yūko Mita. The character also made appearances in the animated theatrical films based on the series, including Urusei Yatsura: Only You (1983), Urusei Yatsura: Remember My Love (1985), Urusei Yatsura: The Final Chapter (1988), and Urusei Yatsura: Always My Darling (1991). Despite not being present in the main plot of the film Urusei Yatsura: Lum the Forever (1986), Benten was featured in the film's credits. In the 1988 "Raging Sherbet" OVA, Benten, along with Lum and Ran, decide to temporarily leave Earth in order to take a summer vacation with Oyuki to her home planet Neptune, where they learn about the Sherbet birds, which produce icy treats on demand. Additionally, Ishigami currently voices the character in the 2022 anime television series adaptation of Urusei Yatsura.

== Reception ==
In October 2019, NHK released the results of a popularity poll on the "Favorite Rumiko Takahashi Characters" list, with Benten ranking last at 30th place. In August 2021, it was reported that a new perfume line produced by Fairytail Parfum would be launched next September, with each fragrance inspired by a character from Urusei Yatsura; Benten's perfume, which cost 1,320 yen, was described as "a simple blend of daisies and freesia". In April 2022, Dave Carl Cutler of Comic Book Resources ranked Benten 8th on the "Top 10 Rumiko Takahashi Waifus" list. Furthermore, Cutler called the character "energetic and high-spirited", as well as highlighting Benten's friendship with both Lum and Oyuki, which, as stated by Cutler, "shows a more grounded side to [Benten's] personality".

== See also ==
- List of Urusei Yatsura characters
