= Shizuka Ishigami =

Japanese voice actress (born 1988)

- 石上 静香
- Born: September 14, 1988 (age 38); Tokyo, Japan
- Occupation: Voice actress
- Years active: 2010–present
- Agent: Office Osawa
- Height: 151 cm (4 ft 11 in)
- Spouse: Kōhei Yanagi (m. 2025)
- Children: 1

Shizuka Ishigami (石上 静香, Ishigami Shizuka; born September 14, 1988) is a Japanese voice actress. She is a former member of 81 Produce and Pro-Fit, and a member of Office Osawa.

== Filmography ==
=== Anime series ===
| Title | Year | Role | Notes | Source |
|---|---|---|---|---|
| Bakuman | 2010 | Ōta; Sekawa | | |
| Cardfight!! Vanguard | 2011 | Mai | | |
| Pretty Rhythm Aurora Dream | 2011 | Action Committee B | Episode 9 | |
| Noucome | 2013 | Girl A Schoolgirl | 2 episodes | |
| Golden Time | 2013 | Female student A Female customer 1 Female senpai D | Episodes 1, 12 and 13 | |
| Nagi-Asu: A Lull in the Sea | 2013 | Akira Shiodome; Store Clerk A | Episode 8, 14-17 and 19-26 | |
| No Matter How I Look at It, It's You Guys' Fault I'm Not Popular! | 2013 | Female student Imaginary friend | Episode 11 and 12 | |
| Walkure Romanze | 2013 | Schoolgirl D | | |
| Witchcraft Works | 2014 | Student | Episode 1 | |
| If Her Flag Breaks | 2014 | Broadcasting Staff B | | |
| Gugure! Kokkuri-san | 2014 | Classmate | | |
| The Fruit of Grisaia | 2014 | Female student 1 | Episode 6 | |
| Daimidaler: Prince vs Penguin Empire | 2014 | Kiriko Kyuna | | |
| Is the Order a Rabbit? | 2014 | Female Customer A | | |
| Recently, My Sister Is Unusual | 2014 | Saleswoman | | |
| Your Lie in April | 2014 | Audience Member; Female student Softball club member Nao Kashiwagi | 3 episodes | |
| Strike the Blood | 2014 | Sakura Koujama | | |
| Bladedance of Elementalers | 2014 | Ellis Fahrengart | | |
| selector infected WIXOSS | 2014 | Editor; Female student Momoka | Episodes 2, 3, 4, 5, 7, 8 and 10 | |
| Tribe Cool Crew | 2014 | Haneru Hiryū | | |
| No-Rin | 2014 | Student | Episode 1 | |
| Nobunaga the Fool | 2014 | Operator; Operator C Soldier D Kitsuno | Episodes 1, 2 and 15 | |
| Magimoji Rurumo | 2014 | Sumiko Inoue | Episode 1 | |
| Love Live! 2nd Season | 2014 | Art Club Member A | Episode 7 | |
| Shimoneta | 2015 | Ayame Kajō | | |
| Food Wars!: Shokugeki no Soma | 2015 | Ikumi Mito | | |
| JoJo's Bizarre Adventure | 2015 | Boy | Episode 35 | |
| Is It Wrong to Try to Pick Up Girls in a Dungeon? | 2015 | Syr Flover | | |
| Mikagura School Suite | 2015 | Haruka Toishi | Episodes 5 and 8 | |
| Symphogear GX | 2015 | Leiur Darahim | | |
| Chivalry of a Failed Knight | 2015 | Stella Vermillion | | |
| Arslan Senki: Fūjin Ranbu | 2016 | Merchant; Townswoman | Episodes 4 and 7 | |
| Active Raid | 2016 | Haruka Hoshimiya | | |
| Bubuki Buranki | 2016 | Kinoa Ōgi | | |
| Undefeated Bahamut Chronicle | 2016 | Yoruka Kirihime | | |
| Kuma Miko: Girl Meets Bear | 2016 | Kaori | | |
| Rin-ne | 2016 | Renge Shima/Damashigami Renge | | |
| Hybrid × Heart Magias Academy Ataraxia | 2016 | Scarlett Fairchild | | |
| Tsukiuta. The Animation | 2016 | Mizuki Himekawa | | |
| D.Gray-Man Hallow | 2016 | Level 4 | | |
| Divine Gate | 2016 | Hervor | | |
| Dimension W | 2016 | Haruna Enamori; Marisa Sakaki | | |
| Rainbow Days | 2016 | Yukiko Asai; Female Student | | |
| Keijo | 2016 | Kotone Fujisaki | | |
| Interviews with Monster Girls | 2017 | Shizuka Kimura; Yūko | Episode 1 | |
| Fuuka | 2017 | Couple Woman; Female Customer | Episode 1, 3 and 4 | |
| Marginal#4: Kiss kara Tsukuru Big Bang | 2017 | Newscaster | | |
| Magical Circle Guru Guru | 2017 | Nike | | |
| Fate/Apocrypha | 2017 | Celenike Icecolle Yggdmillennia | | |
| Gamers! | 2017 | Mika | | |
| Darling in the Franxx | 2018 | Ikuno | | |
| Tada Never Falls in Love | 2018 | Hinako Hasegawa | | |
| Ulysses: Jeanne d'Arc and the Alchemist Knight | 2018 | La Hire | | |
| Goblin Slayer | 2018 | Fighter | | |
| JoJo's Bizarre Adventure: Golden Wind | 2018 | Bruno Bucciarati (young) | | |
| That Time I Got Reincarnated as a Slime | 2019 | Ryōta | | |
| Why the Hell are You Here, Teacher!? | 2019 | Hikari Hazakura | | |
| How Heavy Are the Dumbbells You Lift? | 2019 | Ayaka Uehara | | |
| Is It Wrong to Try to Pick Up Girls in a Dungeon? II | 2019 | Syr Flover | | |
| Vinland Saga | 2019 | Thorfinn (young) | | |
| High School Prodigies Have It Easy Even In Another World | 2019 | Prince Akatsuki | | |
| Gleipnir | 2020 | Hikawa | Episode 1 and 2 | |
| The 8th Son? Are You Kidding Me? | 2020 | Wendelin (young) | | |
| Moriarty the Patriot | 2020 | William James Moriarty (young) | | |
| Yo-kai Watch Jam - Yo-kai Academy Y: Close Encounters of the N Kind | 2020 | Kumako Kumoike/Kuka Nanakumo | | |
| 86 -Eighty Six- | 2021 | Rekka Rin | | |
| Night Head 2041 | 2021 | Naoya Kirihara (young) | | |
| Redo of Healer | 2021 | Setsuna | | |
| The Idaten Deities Know Only Peace | 2021 | Corey | | |
| World's End Harem | 2021 | Neneko Isurugi | | |
| Demon Slayer: Kimetsu no Yaiba – Entertainment District Arc | 2021 | Makio | | |
| Akebi's Sailor Uniform | 2022 | Hitomi Washio | | |
| Urusei Yatsura | 2022 | Benten | | |
| Arknights: Prelude to Dawn | 2022 | Ch'en | | |
| I Got a Cheat Skill in Another World and Became Unrivaled in the Real World, Too | 2023 | Yukine Hyōdō | | |
| KonoSuba: An Explosion on This Wonderful World! | 2023 | Nerimaki | | |
| My Clueless First Friend | 2023 | Taiyō Takada | | |
| The Most Heretical Last Boss Queen | 2023 | Kemet | | |
| Frieren: Beyond Journey's End | 2024 | Laufen | | |
| Mechanical Arms | 2024 | Twos | | |
| Plus-Sized Elf | 2024 | Oeda | | |
| #Compass 2.0: Combat Providence Analysis System | 2025 | Aojiru | | |
| Nukitashi the Animation | 2025 | Nanase Katagiri | | |
| Tougen Anki | 2025 | Shiki Ichinose (young) | | |
| Umamusume: Cinderella Gray | 2025 | Obey Your Master | | |
| Ninja vs. Gokudo | 2025 | Busu | | |
| Sentenced to Be a Hero | 2026 | Patausche Kivia | | |
| The Food Diary of Miss Maid | 2026 | Sora Endō | | |
| Even the Student Council Has Its Holes! | 2026 | Arisu Terui | | |
| Even Though I'm a Super Timid Noble Girl, I Accepted the Bet from My Cunning Fiancé | 2026 | Rufus Stan (child) | | |

=== OVA/ONA ===
| Title | Year | Role | Notes | Source |
|---|---|---|---|---|
| Hime Gal♥Paradise | 2011 | Female student A | | |
| Nozo × Kimi | 2011 | Yūki Makino | | |
| Arknights: Holy Knight Light | 2020 | Ch'en | | |
| Terminator Zero | 2024 | Hiro | | |

=== Video games ===
- Granblue Fantasy as Almeida, Shion
- Food Wars! Shokugeki no Soma: The Dish of Friendship and Bonds as Ikumi Mito
- Seven Pirates Parute Kairi
- Azur Lane as Cheshire, Little Cheshire, Hiryuu, & Hiryuu META
- Fire Emblem Heroes as Petra, Echidna
- Shadowverse as Erika Sumeragi
- Under Night In-Birth as Erika Wagner Miyashiro
- Yuki Yuna is a Hero: A Sparkling Flower as Shizuku Yamabushi
- Magia Record: Puella Magi Madoka Magica Side Story as Masara Kagami
- Tayutama 2 -you're the only one- as Hifumi Saijo
- Is It Wrong to Try to Pick Up Girls in a Dungeon? Infinite Combate as Syr Flover
- Action Taimanin as Faust
- Arknights as Ch'en
- Fire Emblem: Three Houses as Petra Macneary
- Fire Emblem Warriors: Three Hopes as Petra Macneary
- Counter:Side as Lyudmila
- Blue Archive as Saori Joumae

=== Dubbing roles ===
==== Live-action ====
- The Time Traveler's Wife (Young Clare Abshire (Everleigh McDonell))

==== Animation ====
- PAW Patrol (Chase)
- PAW Patrol: The Movie (Chase)
- The Epic Tales of Captain Underpants (Harold Hutchins)

== Discography ==
| No. | Release date | Title |
|---|---|---|
| 1 | July 23, 2014 | Shukusai no Elementaria (祝祭のエレメンタリア, Shukusai no Erementaria; lit. Festival of Elementaria) |
| 1 | July 23, 2014 | Seirei Blade Dance Matsuri (精霊剣舞祭, Seirei Bureidodansu Matsuri; lit. Spirit Blade Dance Festival) |
