= Akiho Suzumoto =

Japanese voice actress

- 涼本 あきほ
- Born: October 16; Tokyo, Japan
- Years active: 2018–present
- Agent: VIMS
- Known for: The Idolmaster Shiny Colors as Natsuha Arisugawa; Blue Archive as Serina Sumi; The Dreaming Boy Is a Realist as Aika Natsukawa

Akiho Suzumoto (涼本 あきほ, Suzumoto Akiho; born October 16) is a Japanese voice actress who is affiliated with the VIMS talent agency. She is known for her roles as Natsuha Arisugawa in The Idolmaster Shiny Colors, Aika Natsukawa in The Dreaming Boy Is a Realist, and Serina Sumi in Blue Archive.

== Biography ==
Suzumoto was inspired to pursue a voice acting career after learning about the multimedia franchise Kantai Collection, noting that it seemed fun to be able to be a voice actor who could play multiple roles. She graduated from the Japan Narration Acting Institute. She also participated in audition for the game BraveSword×BlazeSoul that had 1,101 participants; she was among three people who passed the audition and were given roles in the game.

In 2018, Suzumoto began playing the role of Natsuha Arisugawa in the mobile game The Idolmaster Shiny Colors. In 2022, she voiced a character in a voiced comic video promoting the manga series Hai Basu ni Sumu. In 2023, she was cast in her first main anime role as Aika Natsukawa in the anime television series The Dreaming Boy Is a Realist; she also performs the series' ending theme "Yume wa Mijikashi Koiseyo Otome" as her character. She also plays the role of Serina Sumi in the mobile game Blue Archive. She is set to reprise the role of Arisugawa in the anime television series adaptation of The Idolmaster Shiny Colors in 2024.

Suzumoto is also a member of the voice actor unit Alice Eyez (stylized as ALiCE Eyez) along with Mayuko Kazama, Azusa Shizuki, and Tomomi Tanaka.

== Personal life ==
Suzumoto cites illustrating and doing overhand passes as among her hobbies. She is able to recite 70 digits of pi. Among her favorite musical artists are Chico with HoneyWorks and Supercell.

== Filmography ==
=== Anime ===
2019

- Rifle Is Beautiful, Sayu Kaijima

2023

- The Dreaming Boy Is a Realist, Aika Natsukawa
- Saving 80,000 Gold in Another World for My Retirement, Carla

2024

- The Idolmaster Shiny Colors, Natsuha Arisugawa
- The New Gate, Millie

2026

- The Strongest Job Is Apparently Not a Hero or a Sage, but an Appraiser (Provisional)!, Majin

=== Video games ===
2018

- BraveSword×BlazeSoul, ΦΦΦ (Out of Order)
- The Idolmaster Shiny Colors, Natsuha Arisugawa

2019

- Kōya no Kotobuki Hikōtai - Ōzora no Take Off Girls!, Karan
- Magia Record, Yuna Kureha

2021

- Blue Archive (2021), Serina Sumi
