= Kazue Komiya =

Japanese voice actress (born 1952)

Kazue Komiya (小宮 和枝, Komiya Kazue; born July 12, 1952 in Tokyo, Japan) is a Japanese voice actress who is affiliated with Theater Echo.

== Filmography ==
=== Anime television series ===
- Aim for the Ace! (Kyoko Otowa)
- Ashita no Nadja (Johanna)
- Combat Mecha Xabungle (Greta Karas)
- Fullmetal Alchemist (Lebi)
- Hiatari Ryōkō! (Chigusa Mizusawa)
- La Seine no Hoshi (Princess Marie Therese)
- Maison Ikkoku (Kasumi)
- Monster (Lunge's Wife)
- Otome Yōkai Zakuro (Kushimatsu)
- Paranoia Agent (Misae Ikari)
- Pygmalio (Medusa)
- Super Doll Licca-chan (Nanae Kayama)
- Tekkaman: The Space Knight (Mūtan)
- Touch (Haruko Uesugi)
- Urusei Yatsura (Ran (2nd voice))
- Yu-Gi-Oh! Duel Monsters GX (Tania)

=== Original video animations ===
- Giant Robo: The Animation (Youshi)
- Urusei Yatsura works (Ran)
- Virgin Fleet (Suzukure Mibuno)

=== Anime films ===
- Farewell to Space Battleship Yamato (Sarbera)
- Touch works (Haruko Uesugi)
- Urusei Yatsura works (Ran)
- Candy Candy the Movie works (Mrs. Ruth Leagan)

=== Tokusatsu ===
- Saru No Gundan (Bop)
- Bouken Rockbat (Mimi-chan)
- Daitetsujin 17 (Tommy Boys)

=== Game ===
- Eternal Arcadia (Teodora)
- Mobile Suit Gundam: Zeonic Front (Sophie Franc)

=== Dubbing roles ===
==== Live-action ====
- Kathy Bates
  - Revolutionary Road (Helen Givings)
  - American Horror Story: Hotel (Iris)
  - The Highwaymen (Miriam "Ma" Ferguson)
  - Richard Jewell (Barbara "Bobi" Jewell)
  - Are You There God? It's Me, Margaret. (Sylvia Simon)
- Whoopi Goldberg
  - Ghost (Oda Mae Brown)
  - It's a Very Merry Muppet Christmas Movie (The Boss)
  - Made in America (Sarah Mathews)
  - Monkeybone (Death)
- 24 (Sherry Palmer (Penny Johnson Jerald))
- Addams Family Values (Debbie Jellinsky (Joan Cusack))
- The Americans (Claudia (Margo Martindale))
- Beau Is Afraid (Mona Wassermann (Patti LuPone))
- Bionic Woman (Ruth Truewell (Molly Price))
- Broadchurch (Sharon Bishop QC (Marianne Jean-Baptiste))
- The Burning (1985 Fuji TV edition) (Diane (Kevi Kendall))
- Cat People (2003 DVD edition) (Female (Ruby Dee))
- Coneheads (Prymaat Conehead / Mary Margaret Rowney (Jane Curtin))
- Cory in the House (Ms. Vanderslyce (Amy Tolsky))
- The Crow (1997 TV Tokyo edition) (Darla Mohr (Anna Thomson))
- Date Movie (Roz Fockyerdoder (Jennifer Coolidge))
- Death on the Nile (Marie Van Schuyler (Jennifer Saunders))
- Desperate Housewives (Martha Huber (Christine Estabrook))
- Dharma & Greg (Abby O'Neil (Mimi Kennedy))
- Die Hard with a Vengeance (Connie Kowalski (Colleen Camp))
- Dinosaurs (Fran Sinclair)
- Downton Abbey (Maud, Lady Bagshaw (Imelda Staunton))
- Episodes (Beverly Lincoln (Tamsin Greig))
- ER (Kerry Weaver (Laura Innes))
- Falling Down (1997 TV Asahi edition) (Amanda Prendergast (Tuesday Weld))
- Fires (Caris Mazzeo (Noni Hazlehurst))
- The Fisher King (Anne Napolitano (Mercedes Ruehl))
- The Forgotten (Anne Pope (Alfre Woodard))
- Frasier (Roz Doyle (Peri Gilpin))
- The Good Wife (Diane Lockhart (Christine Baranski))
- The Good Fight (Diane Lockhart (Christine Baranski))
- Halloween II (1988 NTV edition) (Nurse Karen Bailey (Pamela Susan Shoop))
- Harry Potter and the Order of the Phoenix (Dolores Umbridge (Imelda Staunton))
- Harry Potter and the Deathly Hallows – Part 1 (Dolores Umbridge (Imelda Staunton))
- High School Musical (Ms. Darbus (Alyson Reed))
- Hitchcock (Alma Reville (Helen Mirren))
- The Hollars (Sally Hollar (Margo Martindale))
- How the Grinch Stole Christmas (Betty Lou Who (Molly Shannon))
- Hudson Hawk (Minerva Mayflower (Sandra Bernhard))
- Igby Goes Down (Mimi Slocumb (Susan Sarandon))
- In & Out (Emily Montgomery (Joan Cusack))
- Kindergarten Cop (Jillian (Cathy Moriarty))
- Kindergarten Cop (1995 TV Asahi edition) (Detective Phoebe O'Hara (Pamela Reed))
- Last Action Hero (Irene Madigan (Mercedes Ruehl))
- The Last Emperor (1989 TV Asahi edition) (Ar Mo (Jade Go))
- Little Fockers (Roz Focker (Barbra Streisand))
- Little Voice (Mari Hoff (Brenda Blethyn))
- MacGyver (Matilda "Matty" Webber (Meredith Eaton))
- The Man from Toronto (The Handler (Ellen Barkin))
- The Man Who Invented Christmas (Elizabeth Dickens (Ger Ryan))
- Meet the Fockers (Roz Focker (Barbra Streisand))
- Melrose Place (Jo Reynolds (Daphne Zuniga))
- Milk Money (V (Melanie Griffith))
- Mission: Impossible (Shannon Reed (Jane Badler))
- Mrs. America (Bella Abzug (Margo Martindale))
- The Nude Bomb (1988 TV Asahi edition) (Agent 34 (Sylvia Kristel))
- Out of Sight (Karen Sisco (Jennifer Lopez))
- The Outsider (Jeannie Anderson (Mare Winningham))
- The Pale Horse (Sybil Stamfordis (Kathy Kiera Clarke))
- Panic Room (Lydia Lynch (Ann Magnuson))
- The Parent Trap (Chessy (Lisa Ann Walter))
- Parental Guidance (Diane Decker (Bette Midler))
- Piranha (Maggie McKeown (Heather Menzies))
- Powder (Jessie Caldwell (Mary Steenburgen))
- The Purple Rose of Cairo (Rita (Deborah Rush))
- Rambo: Last Blood (Maria Beltran (Adriana Barraza))
- RoboCop 3 (Anne Lewis (Nancy Allen))
- Rome (Atia of the Julii (Polly Walker))
- Romy and Michele's High School Reunion (Heather Mooney (Janeane Garofalo))
- Sledge Hammer! (Detective Dori Doreau (Anne-Marie Martin))
- Sleepless in Seattle (Victoria (Barbara Garrick))
- Stage Mother (Maybelline Metcalf (Jacki Weaver))
- Star Trek: Deep Space Nine (Kira Nerys (Nana Visitor))
- The Stepford Wives (Bobbie Markowitz (Bette Midler))
- Stuck on You (Cher)
- Twilight (Lieutenant Verna Hollander (Stockard Channing))
- Veronica's Closet (Olive Massery (Kathy Najimy))
- Violent Night (Gertrude (Beverly D'Angelo))
- Werewolf by Night (Verussa Bloodstone (Harriet Sansom Harris))
- West Side Story (1979 TBS edition) (Velma (Carole D'Andrea))
- Working Girl (Cynthia (Joan Cusack))

==== Animation ====
- Aaahh!!! Real Monsters (Oblina)
- Arthur Christmas (Margaret Claus)
- Bambi (Aunt Ena)
- Chicken Run (Bunty)
- Coraline (April Spink)
- Dumbo (Prissy, 1983 version)
- Goof Troop (Peg Pete)
- Inside Out (Dream Director)
- Meet the Robinsons (Lucille Krunklehorn)
- Strange World (Ro)
- Titan A.E. (Stith)
- The Transformers (Elita One, Wheelie, Marissa Faireborn)
