= High School Prodigies Have It Easy Even in Another World =

Japanese light novel series and its adaptations

- High School Prodigies Have It Easy Even in Another World!
- First light novel volume cover featuring Lyrule

超人高校生たちは異世界でも余裕で生き抜くようです! (Chōjin-Kōkōseitachi wa Isekai demo Yoyu de Ikinuku Yōdesu!)
- Genre: Fantasy, isekai
- Light novel
- Written by: Riku Misora
- Illustrated by: Sacraneco
- Published by: SB Creative
- English publisher: NA: Yen Press
- Imprint: GA Bunko
- Original run: October 15, 2015 – February 14, 2020
- Volumes: 10
- Manga
- Written by: Riku Misora
- Illustrated by: Kōtarō Yamada
- Published by: Square Enix
- English publisher: NA: Yen Press
- Magazine: Young Gangan
- Original run: May 2016 – October 1, 2021
- Volumes: 13
- Anime television series
- Directed by: Shinsuke Yanagi
- Written by: Deko Akao
- Music by: Hiromi Mizutani
- Studio: Project No.9
- Licensed by: Crunchyroll: SA/SEA: Muse Communication; (expired)
- Original network: Tokyo MX, AT-X, BS Fuji
- English network: SEA: Animax Asia
- Original run: October 3, 2019 – December 19, 2019
- Episodes: 12

High School Prodigies Have It Easy Even in Another World! (超人高校生たちは異世界でも余裕で生き抜くようです!, Chōjin-Kōkōseitachi wa Isekai demo Yoyu de Ikinuku Yōdesu!), abbreviated as Chōyoyū (超余裕), is a Japanese light novel series written by Riku Misora and illustrated by Sacraneco. SB Creative published ten volumes between 2015 and 2020 under their GA Bunko imprint. A manga adaptation with art by Kōtarō Yamada was serialized in Square Enix's seinen manga magazine Young Gangan from May 2016 to October 2021. It has been collected in thirteen tankōbon volumes. Both the light novel and manga are licensed in North America by Yen Press. An anime television series adaptation by Project No.9 aired from October 3 to December 19, 2019.

== Plot ==
The series revolves around seven high school students who are internationally renowned for their exceptional abilities. They include Prime Minister Tsukasa Mikogami, genius inventor Ringo Ohoshi, former ninja and journalist Shinobu Sarutobi, world renowned doctor Keine Kanzaki, swordswoman Aoi Ichijo, skilled magician Prince Akatsuki and multi-millionaire Masato Sanada. One day, they survive a plane crash only to find themselves in a medieval fantasy world called Freyjagard.

In this world, two human races live side by side in somewhat of a feudal society: the Byuma, who possess animal features and formidable strength, and the Hyuma, who possess limited magical aptitude. After being rescued by a Byuma named Winona and her adopted Elven daughter Lyrule, the group decides to repay the people of Elm Village by using their advanced skills and knowledge to revolutionize the village and its culture.

The group also learns of an ancient legend, that narrates how an evil dragon was slain by seven heroes who came from another world. Believing that there is a connection between the legend and their present situation, Tsukasa, who is also the leader of the group, directs the others to learn about this new world and also search for any clues that could lead them back to Earth. However, the group's ideas become a threat to the ruling Freyjagard Empire, who promote state atheism and social Darwinist belief that only the strong nobility shall rule and the weak commoners must obey the nobles or suffer punishment. The conflict with the Empire soon leads the Seven Prodigies to create a new nation with equal rights and democracy for the people.

== Characters ==
=== Seven Prodigies ===
Tsukasa Mikogami (御子神 司, Mikogami Tsukasa)
Voiced by: Yūsuke Kobayashi (Japanese); Chris Hackney (English)
Tsukasa is a prime minister while still in high school, and because he has been a target of frequent assassination attempts, he is also a very capable fighter. His father was a former prime minister who used corrupt means to provide luxury for the family and held absolute power until Tsukasa disapproved of his actions and exposed his faults, leading to his execution and his mother disowning him. Tsukasa is childhood friends with Masato and Shinobu. Tsukasa chooses to benefit others over himself, family, friends and associates. After conquering the Empire, Tsukasa takes charge of politics to avert foreseen war affairs. He has heterochromia.
Ringo Ōhoshi (大星 林檎, Ōhoshi Ringo)
Voiced by: Rina Hidaka (Japanese); Erika Harlacher (English)
Ringo is a very intelligent inventor who is able to invent nuclear reactors on her own that produce practically no radiation. She is usually targeted by criminals who want her capabilities for profit and lives in isolation in outer space. She has a computer companion named Kumausa. Ringo was born out of artificial insemination with her DNA modified, making her rather intelligent from a young age. Ringo was estranged from humanity since her mother, a scientist, abandoned her out of jealousy but her mother was forced to divorce by her father, blaming her for abandoning her and discovering it, until meeting Tsukasa in middle school who gave her a reason to live.
Shinobu Sarutobi (猿飛 忍, Sarutobi Shinobu)
Voiced by: Natsumi Hioka (Japanese); Kira Buckland (English)
Shinobu is a descendant of ninjas and a top journalist who is able to uncover any scoop and information. Her ancestor is Sarutobi Sasuke. She tends to manipulate her opponents through her charms. She seems to dote on Elch.
Keine Kanzaki (神崎 桂音, Kanzaki Keine)
Voiced by: Hisako Kanemoto (Japanese); Erica Mendez (English)
Keine is the most miraculous doctor in the world, so much so that she can even cure latent cancer. Her patients have never died in her hands. Her ability to produce medicine from coal or tar rivals those using elixirs. She can also defend herself from foes by injecting them with anesthesia. Keine is beautiful, gorgeous even, but her looks hide a psychotic mind. She despises how easily the human body succumbs to sickness, and curses God for creating weak beings, declaring her desire to kill God. At one point, Keine tries to give Ringo a drug so she can use it to basically rape Tsukasa and does not see a problem with that behavior. She also lobotomizes Count Celenteus with a saw, in order to reform him into an honest doctor.
Aoi Ichijō (一条 葵, Ichijō Aoi)
Voiced by: Sayaka Kaneko (Japanese); Cristina Vee (English)
Aoi is a swordswoman wielding a katana. Her physical abilities are so immense that she has defeated entire armies of terrorists solo; a monstrous lord, and maneuver a missile physically. She and Keine went to the same middle school together. Her katana is actually cursed, but is the only one in existence she can wield without breaking it due to her immense strength; the curse itself has to redirect to keeping the katana from breaking.
Prince Akatsuki (プリンス 暁, Purinsu Akatsuki)
Voiced by: Shizuka Ishigami (Japanese); Erica Mendez (English)
Akatsuki is the best magician ever, capable of levitation; smokescreens; and making big monuments such as the Statue of Liberty, or even mountains, vanish. He is often mistaken for a girl due to his feminine figure. Tsukasa forces Akatsuki to pose as a god to persuade civilians that change is indeed possible.
Masato Sanada (真田 勝人, Sanada Masato)
Voiced by: Junji Majima (Japanese); Nicolas Roye (English)
Masato is the most successful businessman in the world while still in high school. He has rescued industries from near bankruptcy. His multi-listening ability allows him to fathom people's movement. He has a thing for Winona despite her already being a mother. He got the Neutscheland Company on edge forcing them not to go cheap. After increasing finances to survive the winter when setting up a successful trading company in the other world, Masato took in Roo as his apprentice.

=== Other characters ===
Lyrule (リルル, Riruru)
Voiced by: Yūki Kuwahara (Japanese); Cassandra Lee Morris (English)
Lyrule is the lead heroine. A beautiful and mysterious elf, she treated the seven prodigies' injuries when they arrived in the other world. She is Winona's adoptive daughter. The villagers intend to keep her secret since the nobles would want her as a concubine. Tsukasa suspects Lyrule might hold the reason for their presence in the world. Lyrule appears to have feelings for Tsukasa.
Winona (ウィノナ)
Voiced by: Mai Nakahara (Japanese); Tara Sands (English)
Elch's mother and Lyrule's adoptive mother. She was her village's top hunter before settling down.
Elch (エルク, Eruku)
Voiced by: Hiro Shimono (Japanese); Billy Kametz (English)
Winona's son. He acts as the treasurer of his village and often means to go straightforward in protecting its position and people. Elch hates the nobles because of their greed and bad treatment of the commoners. After handling Masato's success in permitting money business and Tsukasa's proclamation to usurp the empire, Elch gains more confidence.
Roo (ルー, Rū)
Voiced by: Chinami Hashimoto (Japanese); Xanthe Huynh (English)
An escaped slave who pleaded Masato to take her in after seeing his strong determination. Roo hopes to one day reunite with her parents while becoming a brilliant money-maker. Her math needs work, since she can only do it while thinking of "shinies".
Jeanne du Leblanc (ジャンヌ・ド・ルブラン, Jannu do Ruburan)
Voiced by: Sayaka Senbongi (Japanese); Kira Buckland (English)
A lady knight whom Shinobu befriends after witnessing her bravery in saving a child despite being an outsider. Jeanne is a member of the Azure Brigade, a group of reformist nobles within the Empire who want to change the Empire to ensure the commoners are treated well and not like animals. Jeanne and Shinobu team up to confront Gustav and his despotism. She is the only one of the Azure Brigade to not be greedy and truly think of the people.
Oslo El Gustav (オスロー・エル・ギュスターヴ, Osurō Eru Gusutāvu)
Voiced by: Jouji Nakata
Also known as "Duke Fastidious", Gustav was a mage who gained recognition during the Freyjagard Empire's war with the Yamato Empire and was granted the title of Duke and lands to rule. Despite being a powerful mage, Gustav is revealed to be a horrible ruler where he confiscated money and starves his people to build statues and towns as a sign of his devotion to the Emperor, not caring that many people died or forced themselves into cannibalism just to survive. He is madly loyal to the Emperor to the point that he considers any slights to be a major offense that deserves death. Due to his poor leadership skills where he sent his army to crush the Seven-Light Faith despite lacking winter gear, his army is defeated by the better-armed and prepared army of the Seven-Light faith, allowing the Azure Brigade to attack his castle unopposed.
Zest Do Bernard (ゼスト・バーナード, Zesuto bānādo)
Voiced by: Masaaki Mizunaka

== Media ==
=== Light novels ===
The novels were written by Riku Misora and illustrated by Sacraneco. Ten volumes were published by SB Creative under their GA Bunko imprint between October 2015 and February 2020.

No.	Original release date	Original ISBN	English release date	English ISBN
1	October 15, 2015	978-4-7973-8505-2	July 21, 2020	978-1-9753-0972-5
2	February 15, 2016	978-4-7973-8691-2	October 20, 2020	978-1-9753-0974-9
3	June 15, 2016	978-4-7973-8844-2	January 19, 2021	978-1-9753-0976-3
4	October 15, 2016	978-4-7973-8941-8	June 1, 2021	978-1-9753-0978-7
5	June 15, 2017	978-4-7973-9278-4	September 28, 2021	978-1-9753-0980-0
6	December 15, 2017	978-4-7973-9526-6	May 24, 2022	978-1-9753-0982-4
7	June 15, 2018	978-4-7973-9625-6; 978-4-7973-9624-9 (SE)	December 13, 2022	978-1-9753-5008-6
8	March 15, 2019	978-4-8156-0141-6	May 23, 2023	978-1-9753-5010-9
9	October 12, 2019	978-4-8156-0379-3	October 17, 2023	978-1-9753-5012-3
10	February 14, 2020	978-4-8156-0534-6	March 26, 2024	978-1-9753-5014-7

=== Manga ===
No.	Original release date	Original ISBN	English release date	English ISBN
1	October 13, 2016	978-4-7575-5122-0	October 30, 2018	978-1-9753-0134-7
2	March 25, 2017	978-4-7575-5294-4	January 29, 2019	978-1-9753-0137-8
3	June 13, 2017	978-4-7575-5370-5	April 30, 2019	978-1-9753-0140-8
4	December 13, 2017	978-4-7575-5547-1	August 6, 2019	978-1-9753-0143-9
5	June 13, 2018	978-4-7575-5744-4	November 5, 2019	978-1-9753-8487-6
6	January 25, 2019	978-4-7575-5946-2	January 21, 2020	978-1-9753-3289-1
7	July 25, 2019	978-4-7575-6136-6	April 28, 2020	978-1-9753-0889-6
8	September 25, 2019	978-4-7575-6314-8	August 25, 2020	978-1-9753-0892-6
9	December 25, 2019	978-4-7575-6445-9	December 29, 2020	978-1-9753-1787-4
10	July 22, 2020	978-4-7575-6766-5	June 29, 2021	978-1-9753-2456-8
11	December 24, 2020	978-4-7575-6956-0	January 25, 2022	978-1-9753-3637-0
12	June 24, 2021	978-4-7575-7330-7	August 9, 2022	978-1-9753-4366-8
13	December 25, 2021	978-4-7575-7640-7	July 18, 2023	978-1-9753-4810-6

=== Anime ===
An anime television series adaptation was announced by GA Bunko on March 13, 2019. The series is animated by Project No.9 and directed by Shinsuke Yanagi, with Deko Akao handling series composition, and Akane Yano designing the characters. Hiromi Mizutani is composing the series' music. It aired from October 3 to December 19, 2019, on Tokyo MX, AT-X, and BS Fuji. Dialogue+ performed the series' opening theme song "Hajimete no Kakumei", while Akari Kitō performed the series' ending theme song "dear my distance." Crunchyroll has licensed the series with an English dub had been produced.

No.	Title (Note: All English titles are taken from Crunchyroll.)	Original release date
1	"High School Prodigies Have Arrived in Another World!"; Transliteration: "Chōjin kōkōseitachi wa isekai ni kiteshimatta yōdesu!" (Japanese: 超人高校生たちは異世界に来てしまったようです！)	October 3, 2019
Seven Japanese high schoolers who are prodigies in their fields; Politician and Prime Minister of Japan Tsukasa Mikogami, Genius inventor Ringo Ōhoshi, Ninja Journalist Shinobu Sarutobi, Medical Doctor Keine Kanzaki, Samurai swordswoman Aoi Ichijō, Magician Prince Akatsuki and Businessman Masato Sanada, survives a plane crash only to find themselves in another world with magic where a race of humans with animal-like features called Bumas live alongside humans. The Prodigies are rescued and treated by a Buma named Winona and her elven daughter Lyrule. As the people of Elm Village celebrate the Prodigies recovery, they learn of the legend about seven heroes from another world who saved the continent from an evil dragon. Believing there might be a connection, Tsukasa instructs his friends to learn more about the Freyjagard Empire and its culture so they might find a way to get back home and also help improve the welfare of Elm Village using their advanced knowledge and skills to repay them. When soldiers of a local feudal lord tries to extort Elm villagers for food and wine, the Prodigies defeat and scare them into leaving the villagers alone and never tell their lord about the incident. Despite this, the Prodigies continue their plan while they help in their own way.
2	"Masato is Serious About Making Money!"; Transliteration: "Masato wa honki de kanemōke wo suru yōdesu!" (Japanese: 勝人は本気で金儲けをするようです！)	October 10, 2019
Masato and Elch run into trouble acquiring money and supplies for Elm Village when they discover the Neutscheland Company has a virtual monopoly on the flow of commerce throughout Dormundt. While the rest of the high schoolers do various odd jobs at the village, Shinobu uses her skills to dig up scandalous information on the Mayor of Dormundt, allowing Masato to acquire a permit to trade under the name "Elm Trading Company." After taking in a homeless girl named Roo, Masato and Elch visit some local merchants and offer to help them sell their wares in Dormundt through a consignment shop, where they'd undercut Neutscheland by charging less and only taking 10% of the profits from each sale, as long as the merchants stock and man the stores themselves. Masato's shop quickly becomes popular, selling everything from rugs to Tsukasa's homemade mayonnaise, and sends money and supplies to Elm Village. Neutscheland dismisses the Elm Trading Company as a nuisance at first, but when the Sea Serpent maritime merchant company begins trading with Masato, Neutscheland decides to take the threat seriously, setting up a rival store to undercut Elm's prices and drive them out of business. Masato shows Elch several Buma standing outside, hinting that they are part of his plan to destroy Neutscheland for good.
3	"It Seems Roo Can Decide Her Own Worth!"; Transliteration: "Rū wa jibun no kachi wo jibun de kimeta yōdesu!" (Japanese: ルーは自分の価値を自分で決めたようです！)	October 17, 2019
Neutscheland's attempt to destroy Elm Trading Company backfires as the merchants they fired to save money ends with the angry merchants boycotting Neutscheland and signing a contract with Masato to supply Elm Trading Company instead, which the head of the Neutscheland Company admits defeat and makes a deal with Masato over sharing trading rights in Findolf. Slave traders attempt to capture back Roo only for Masato to buy her freedom after the young girl promises to Masato she will become a great merchant to free her parents from slavery. Tsukasa and the other Prodigies build a public bathhouse for Elm Village but when a giant bear attacks the villagers including Winona's father, Village Chief Ulga, Tsukasa leads the others to help while Aoi defeats the bear and Keine heals Ulga's wounds. Meanwhile, Masato and his companions return to Elm Village only for them and the rest of the villagers to get arrested by soldiers of Marquis Findolf led by his knight, Inzagi. Inzagi falsely charges the villagers for treason with his absurd claim that peasants that try to rise above their station and having gold coins is considered a crime against the nobility. Inzagi orders the villagers to be burned inside their homes as punishment but Akatsuki manages to free the villagers before Tsukasa and the others arrive where they learn Inzagi has kidnapped Lyrule.
4	"It Seems Tsukasa has Resolved to Change the World!"; Transliteration: "Tsukasa wa isekai wo kaeru kakugo wo kimeta yōdesu!" (Japanese: 司は異世界を変える覚悟を決めたようです！)	October 24, 2019
Lyrule is kidnapped by Inzagi and is forced to become Marquis Findolf's concubine in exchange for the lives of Elm Village but a mysterious magic protects her when Findolf tries to kiss her. Meanwhile, Tsukasa and the Prodigies help the Elm Villagers rescue Lyrule and start a revolution to overthrow the Freyjagard Empire and make it into an advanced, modern democratic nation where everyone is equal and has rights. Thanks to Ringo's Rail cannon, metal arrows and Duralumin shields, the Prodigies and Elm Villagers are able to storm into Findolf's castle and fight his soldiers easily while Shinobu and Tsukasa sneaks in to rescue Lyrule. While Shinobu holds off Inzagi, Tsukasa enters Findolf's room where Lyrule is but is shot by Findolf's flintlock pistol. However, Tsukasa survives unhurt thanks to his suit being made of bulletproof fibers and takes out his own handgun. The Marquis begs for his life but Tsukasa shoots him with a rubber bullet instead since the Prodigies actions and ideals have already made them enemies of the Empire and they will not stop until the revolution is complete. A mysterious being later uses Lyrule body to tell Tsukasa and the Prodigies they must save the continent before disappearing. As everyone celebrates rescuing Lyrule and defeating Findolf's army, Tsukasa plans his next task of forming an independent nation.
5	"It Seems Akatsuki's Becoming God Akatsuki!"; Transliteration: "Akatsuki wa Goddo Akatsuki ni naru yōdesu!" (Japanese: 暁はゴッド暁になるようです！)	October 31, 2019
The Prodigies start a religion called "The Seven-Light Faith" with Akatsuki as the God and the rest of the Prodigies as his Angels in order to easily convince the people to accept them and their new nation. Using Akatsuki's magic tricks and free gifts of Mayonnaise, they are able to convince the people of Dormundt to switch their allegiance from the Empire to the Seven-Light Faith. Tsukasa later makes a deal with the Mayor of Dormundt, Walter von Haizerad, to peacefully have the city defect to the Seven-Light Faith with his position intact and talks with Zest Do Bernard, the former Captain of the Dormundt Watch, to become the leader of the newly formed Seven-Light Knight Order, after convincing Bernard that his daughter's future in their new nation is worth fighting against the Empire. Meanwhile, Shinobu and Elch travel to Buchwald where they learn the Empire is sending an army to reclaim Findolf from the Prodigies led by Duke Oslo El Gustav, a war hero and notorious control freak. At his castle, Gustav kills Inzagi for running away rather than fighting the rebels and vows to burn them.
6	"It Seems Lyrule's Growing Closer to Him!"; Transliteration: "Riruru wa kyori wo chijimeru yōdesu!" (Japanese: リルルは距離を縮めるようです！)	November 7, 2019
As Tsukasa implements his political reforms and modernize the livelihoods of the people, his ministers and friends are worried he is working too hard. With the Empire planning to attack Findolf in the Spring, Tsukasa modernizes the Seven-Light's army by having Ringo build a power plant and a factory to mass-produce guns in order to prepare for the upcoming invasion. Lyrule believes Tsukasa hates her as he is declining her attempts to repay him for saving her but Masato assures her that Tsukasa is keeping his distance out of guilt when he at first told the Elm Villagers not to rescue her from Marquis Findolf. Later that night, Lyrule confronts Tsukasa in his office where he reveals he used to admire his father, the previous Japanese Prime Minister until he learned how corrupt his father was and with the help of his friends, exposed his father's corruption which got him arrested and then executed but this damaged his relationship with his mother since she loved her husband and never forgave Tsukasa. Since then, Tsukasa devoted himself to becoming a selfless politician for the people which saddens Lyrule who tells him that she will be there for him and never hate him. Elsewhere, Roo is having a hard time learning multiplication but with help from the other Prodigies, she manages to figure it out. Meanwhile, Shinobu and Elch discover a dark secret of a village.
7	"It Seems Shinobu Has a Shinobi's Intuition!"; Transliteration: "Nin wa shinobi no kan ga hataraku yōdesu!" (Japanese: 忍はシノビの勘がはたらくようです！)	November 14, 2019
Shinobu and Elch stays at an inn run by Emerada and her daughter Melinda at Coconono village in Gustav's lands. Despite the villagers proclaiming how great their village is, Shinobu becomes suspicious after noticing none of the villagers are eating the food they serve despite starving themselves and she and Elch soon discover Coconono's dark secret, the villagers have been secretly drugging travelers before killing and eating them. When Duke Gustav's soldiers punishes Melinda for having dirt on her clothes during an inspection, Shinobu gives herself up to their leader, Silver Knight Jeanne Do Leblanc, in exchange for sparing Melinda after learning the girl tried to warn Shinobu and Elch to leave the village. Elch confronts Emerada over the dead travellers, which Emerada apologizes and explains that Coconono was once a normal farming village but when Duke Gustav took over their lands, he forced the villagers to turn Coconono into a beautiful town using the villagers own money and ordered them to always keep their clothes clean, meaning they could no longer farm for food or earn money. His obsessive rules put a toll on the villagers lives to the point where they were forced into cannibalism just to survive, which many of them regret. Meanwhile, Jeanne frees Shinobu and reveals that she is actually a member of the Azure Brigade, whom opposes Duke Gustav's tyranny and asks for her help. Elsewhere, Duke Gustav becomes angry upon learning his army has yet to attack the rebels at Findolf and decides to take action by using his magic spear, Heaven's Flames, to destroy Dormundt. Tsukasa and Ringo learn about the attack and uses the many anti-aircraft missiles in Findolf to redirect the spear into the ocean but the spear manages to evade the last missile and hits Dormundt.
8	"It Seems Aoi's Specs are Greater Than Imagined!"; Transliteration: "Aoi wa sōzō ijō no Supekku wo hakki suru yōdesu!" (Japanese: 葵は想像以上のスペックを発揮するようです！)	November 21, 2019
The spear hits Dormundt's noble district and starting a fire, which Mayor Walter orders an evacuation of civilians as instructed in Tsukasa's emergency manual. Despite managing to evacuate the people and preventing the fire from spreading, Duke Gustave summons fire spirits from his spear to kill the people of Dormundt and spread the fire further. Lyrule reveals to the Prodigies the being that possessed her has told her they need to destroy the spear to stop Heaven's Flames from spreading. Using Ringo's last missile, Aoi volunteers to escort the missile and protect it from Gustav fire spirits so it can destroy the spear. The missile destroys the spear and stops the Heaven's Flames, which is felt by Duke Gustav, who vows revenge on the rebels. As the Prodigies help the people of Dormundt, Lyrule reveals the being that possessed her also gave her knowledge of magic and the ability to speak with spirits so she wants to learn how to use magic to help. Thanks to information by Shinobu that Duke Gustav won't be able to use another Heaven's Flames for some time and working with the Azure Brigade, Tsukasa orders a surprise attack on Gustav's army led by Zest and fifty soldiers armed with winter gear and semi-automatic rifles.
9	"It Seems Tsukasa Has Seen Through Everything!"; Transliteration: "Tsukasa wa subete wo mitōshiteiru yōdesu!" (Japanese: 司は全てを見通しているようです！)	November 28, 2019
Gustav orders Marquis Arclide and Marquis Buchwald and their forces to invade Findolf now despite their protests as attacking unprepared during the winter is a horrible idea. Arclide and Buchwald's forces are forced to retreat after being driven back by Zest's forces thanks to their semi-automatic rifles and grenades before both Marquis surrender to the Seven-Light faith. At the same time, the Azure Brigade attack Duke Gustav and his men at his castle. Jeanne and Shinobu confronts Gustav and orders him to surrender but he refuses, leading to the fight between them. They defeat Gustav but not before the Duke blows himself with his magic, seemingly killing himself. After the Seven-Light faith and Azure Brigade take over Gustav's lands and restore order, the Prodigies have a meeting on whether the Azure Brigade can be trusted and become allies.
10	"It Seems Ringo's Worked Up the Courage to Become a Hunter!"; Transliteration: "Ringo wa yūki wo dashite karyūdo ni naru yōdesu!" (Japanese: 林檎は勇気を出して狩人になるようです！)	December 5, 2019
Tsukasa comes to the conclusion that the Azure Brigade is hiding something from the Prodigies and aren't to be trusted, especially their new leader, Count Conrad. Before they can move forward with their plans, Keine tells Tsukasa and Ringo to take some time off before they collapse in exhaustion from their overworked schedules. They agree and Tsukasa asks Ringo to accompany him around town to a popular food spot, causing her to believe it is a date. Ringo asks Aoi and Keine for advice on approaching boys, but their experience is limited to their skills and not in romance. Shinobu offers the best advice when she says to follow a multi-step plan that involves holding hands and indirect kisses. They begin their tour of the town and are forced to wear disguises in order to fend off the attention of the commoners. Before Ringo is able to implement her plan to hold hands with Tsukasa, they arrive at the restaurant, foiling the first step. When she switches drinks with Tsukasa to share an indirect kiss, she passes out in embarrassment when it ends up being successful. She ends up dreaming about her upbringing with her mother, who was artificially inseminated in order to create a prodigy child. However, her mother abandoned her out of spite when Ringo began winning awards for her genius at such a young age. Left with nothing, she contemplated her existence before Tsukasa appeared at her school one day and kept giving her broken objects to fix. This gave her a reason to live and caused her to fall in love with him. She awakens from her dream on Tsukasa's lap and happily states that it is thanks to him that she is where she is today. Overlooking the seaport of the town, Tsukasa admires its beauty before giving Ringo an important task.
11	"It Seems Keine Can't Stand Naughty Boys!"; Transliteration: "Katsura oto wa warui ko wo kesshite yurushi tari wa shinai yōdesu!" (Japanese: 桂音は悪い子を決して許したりはしないようです！)	December 12, 2019
Shinobu discovers Conrad is planning to have the Azure Brigade rejoin the Freyjagard Empire, just as Tsukasa predicted of their betrayal. Elsewhere, a Septicaemia epidemic has spread amongst the commoners which Keine attempts to cure despite suffering a Penicillin shortage due to Ringo's newest project. However, Count Serentius of the Medical Guild demands Keine allows his Guild to sell opium to the sick, but Keine refused. She instead makes a deal with Serentius that she will cure the sick using coal, and if she fails, she will allow him to sell opium. With the help of Lyrule's magic and Keine's knowledge of chemistry, they turn the coal into sulfonamide, making enough to cure all of the patients. Count Serentius and his men attempt to poison the sulfonamide to ruin the Seven-Light faith reputation, but is stopped by Keine, who subsequently lobotomizes them into faithful people. Meanwhile, Ringo finally finishes her latest work, an ICBM. At the Empire, General Neuro allows Conrad and the Azure Brigade to rejoin the Empire but wants them to destroy the Seven-Light Faith, whose ideas of equality goes against the Empire's survival of the fitness mantra by providing them with an army and a mysterious mage named Tanganika. Elsewhere, Conrad's Knight Raisenach and his men attempt to kill Jeanne, but is saved by Shinobu, who then kills the assassins, including Raisenach, after Jeanne learns he killed her mentor and the previous leader of the Azure Brigade, Count Blumhardt. Jeanne is devastated after learning her comrades have betrayed her mentor's original goals of the Azure Brigade of improving the welfare of the people, but is assured by Shinobu that Seven-Light Faith will help achieve those goals. While Jeanne and Shinobu discovers Gustav's golden statue in Conrad's castle, Conrad returns with Tanganika who Shinobu recognizes.
12	"It Seems High School Prodigies Have It Easy In Another World!"; Transliteration: "Chōjin-kokoseitachi wa isekai demo yoyu de ikinuku yōdesu!" (Japanese: 超人高校生たちは異世界でも余裕で生き抜くようです!！)	December 19, 2019
Tanganika is revealed to be Gustav in disguise and kills Conrad for smashing his golden statue. He then turns his attention to Jeanne and Shinobi and attacks them, who he knew were hiding in the same room. They escape, but not before Gustav destroys the castle, killing every guard in his wake. As he marvels his new powers, Gustav is suddenly blown up by Ringo's newly built ballistic missile. The sight of the blast is seen from Dormundt, where the Prodigies contemplate the use of the weapon. Ringo comforts Tsukasa, who believes he will be hated for using such destructive means to negotiate diplomacy with the other nations. The next day, the Prodigies give a speech to their citizens, where Tsukasa reveals that they are now one nation, known as the Elm Republic, and must defend themselves as a republic, not under a dictatorship. While giving the speech, a pillar of fire suddenly appears, revealing Gustav, who transforms into a demon and attacks the Prodigies. Aoi and Shinobu attempt to dispatch of him, using the mysterious gem protruding from Gustav's chest as their target, but are knocked back. Gustav leaps toward Tsukasa, who pulls out a handgun and destroys the gem as the demon reaches him. As he dies, Gustav warns Tsukasa of the trials ahead of him and boasts that the Prodigies will never succeed. Elsewhere, a trio from the Yamato Empire and General Neuro observe the events in Dormundt with the latter proposing that the Seven-Light Faith may be an obstacle for him. The next day, Tsukasa, believing himself to be inferior to the abilities of the other Prodigies, contemplates Gustav's warning. He is greeted by the other Prodigies, who have developed a biodegradable container to sell mayonnaise, and rejoice the defeat of Gustav and the birth of the Elm Republic with the townsfolk.

== Reception ==
=== Previews ===
The anime adaptation's first episode garnered poor reviews from Anime News Network's staff during the Fall 2019 season previews. Rebecca Silverman felt the adaptation was indistinguishable compared to previous isekai shows and contained numerous plot holes and fanservice moments. Theron Martin commended the production merits of the episode and was intrigued by what the main cast will bring moving forward but was critical of the overall setup having holes and straining credibility. Nick Creamer felt the setup of the premise was generically explained and lacked organic storytelling, didn't reveal more about its characters, and had "middling animation and art design" throughout its production. Despite giving praise to the visuals and finding some likable characters, Lynzee Loveridge was put off by the various "plot conveniences" that the main savants easily sidestep with their abilities. The fifth reviewer, James Beckett, gave credit to the "technical qualities" for being decent and consistent that displays "genuine care" throughout the show, but criticized it for being "a bargain-bin isekai light novel adaptation" with "blandly competent" and overly perfect protagonists ripped straight from the Danganronpa blueprint, concluding that: "There are so many isekai coming out this fall, and even the bad ones we've gotten so far are more interesting and worthwhile than this. I'll take the dumb show about the butthole sniffing pet maniac over whatever this flavorless gruel is any day."

=== Series ===
Martin reviewed the complete anime series in 2020 and gave it a C+ grade. He praised the overall isekai setup and plot progression to involve each of the seven protagonists (singling out Tsukasa for having an engaging character), but felt it made leaps in logic when explaining its cast's abilities and "situational contrivances" they solve effortlessly, the world setting not being well explained and character development not being shared amongst its ensemble, concluding that: "On the whole, High School Prodigies Have It Easy Even in Another World has some legitimate entertainment value and a few interesting aspects, especially if you can just turn your mind off and roll with the premise. However, what variety it offers isn't enough to make it memorable or merit recommendation beyond dedicated isekai fans."

Gadget Tsūshin listed Mayotarō (a fan nickname for Tsukasa Mikogami referring to the first episode mayonnaise) in their 2019 anime buzzwords list.
