= Rinku =

Rinku may refer to:

== Characters ==
- Rinku (The Legend of Zelda) or Link, the main character in The Legend of Zelda media
- Rinku (YuYu Hakusho), a character in YuYu Hakusho media
- Rinku Aimoto, character from the media D4DJ

== Sports ==
- Rinku Hooda, Indian para javelin thrower
- Rinku Moni, see India women's national football team
- Rinku Singh (wrestler), Indian professional wrestler

== Geography ==
- Rinku Gate Tower Building, a 57-storey building Rinku Town completed in August 1996
- Rinku Town, a commercial development in Osaka, Japan, adjacent to Kansai International Airport

== See also ==
- Riku (disambiguation)
