= Yō Inoue =

Japanese voice actress (1946–2003)

Yō Inoue 井上 瑤
- Born: Yumi Shitsukawa (漆川 由美); December 4, 1946; Tokyo, Empire of Japan
- Died: February 28, 2003 (aged 56)
- Occupation: Voice actress
- Notable credit(s): Mobile Suit Gundam as Sayla Mass; Urusei Yatsura as Ran; High School! Kimengumi as Amanojaku; Osomatsu-kun (1988) as Osomatsu Matsuno; Mobile Police Patlabor as Kanuka Clancy; Invincible Steel Man Daitarn 3 as Reika Sanjō

Yumi Shitsukawa (漆川 由美, Shitsukawa Yumi; December 4, 1946 – February 28, 2003), also known by her stage name Yō Inoue (井上 瑤, Inoue Yō), was a Japanese voice actress.

In late 2001, Inoue was diagnosed with lung cancer and underwent treatments during 2002, with her condition deteriorating rapidly by the last month of her life.

At the time of her death, she was affiliated with the Tokyo Actor's Consumer's Cooperative Society. She had previously affiliated with Production Baobab, Office Osawa, and other agencies. Her role as Ryo Bakura in Yu-Gi-Oh! Duel Monsters was taken over by Rica Matsumoto.

== Selected filmography ==
- Urusei Yatsura – Ran (First voice)
- Osomatsu-kun (1988) – Osomatsu Matsuno
- Mobile Suit Gundam – Sayla Mass, Kikka Kitamoto, Haro, Pero
- Mobile Suit Gundam ZZ – Sayla Mass
- Mobile Police Patlabor – Kanuka Clancy
- Baoh – Sophine
- Let's Go! Anpanman – Tendon Ka-san, Kurobe
- Yatterman – Chiro, Himeko, Keroppa
- Yattodetaman – Aladdin, Jack
- Itadakiman – Oscar, Sam
- Space Runaway Ideon – Sheryl Formosa, Lou Piper
- Tōshō Daimos – Kairo
- High School! Kimengumi – Jako Amano
- Macross 7 – Gepelnich
- Invincible Steel Man Daitarn 3 – Reika Sanjō
- Yu-Gi-Oh! Duel Monsters – Ryo Bakura (Eps. 12–41)
- YuYu Hakusho – Shorin, Rando
- Ranma ½ – Rinko
- Magic User's Club – Akiko Aburatsubo
- Gatchaman II – Paimer
- Tenchi Muyo! Manatsu no Eve – Yuzuha
- Fatal Fury: The Motion Picture – Panni Shona
- Domain of Murder – Mama

=== Dubbing ===
- My Lucky Stars – Barbara Woo / Swordflower / Lo Hon Gwo (Sibelle Hu)
- Top Gun (1989 Fuji TV edition) – Carole Bradshaw (Meg Ryan)
- Homeward Bound: The Incredible Journey – Sassy (Sally Field)
- Homeward Bound II: Lost in San Francisco – Sassy (Sally Field)
- The Swan Princess: Escape from Castle Mountain – Queen Uberta (Christy Landers)
- The Swan Princess III: The Mystery of the Enchanted Treasure – Queen Uberta (Christy Landers)
