= The Strongest Job Is Apparently Not a Hero or a Sage, but an Appraiser (Provisional)! =

Japanese light novel series

- First light novel volume cover

最強の職業は勇者でも賢者でもなく鑑定士（仮）らしいですよ？ (Saikyō no Shokugyō wa Yūsha demo Kenja demo naku Kanteishi (Kari) Rashii Desu yo?)
- Genre: Isekai
- Novel series
- Written by: Atekichi
- Published by: AlphaPolis
- Original run: August 31, 2016 – present
- Light novel
- Written by: Atekichi
- Illustrated by: Akira Shigaraki
- Published by: AlphaPolis
- Original run: March 1, 2017 – present
- Volumes: 9
- Manga
- Written by: Atekichi
- Illustrated by: Atsushi Takeda
- Published by: AlphaPolis
- English publisher: NA: Alpha Manga
- Original run: August 15, 2017 – present
- Volumes: 11
- Anime television series
- Directed by: Makoto Hoshino
- Written by: Megumi Shimizu
- Studio: Studio Flad
- Licensed by: Crunchyroll
- Original network: Tokyo MX, BS Asahi, HTB, AT-X, EBC, YtS, UX, HAB, NCC
- Original run: April 5, 2026 – June 20, 2026
- Episodes: 12
- icon

The Strongest Job Is Apparently Not a Hero or a Sage, but an Appraiser (Provisional)! (Japanese: 最強の職業は勇者でも賢者でもなく鑑定士（仮）らしいですよ？, Hepburn: Saikyō no Shokugyō wa Yūsha demo Kenja demo naku Kanteishi (Kari) Rashii Desu yo?) is a Japanese light novel series written by Atekichi and illustrated by Akira Shigaraki. It was originally posted as a web novel on the online service AlphaPolis in August 2016, before beginning publication as a light novel in March 2017; nine volumes have been published as of March 2026. A manga adaptation illustrated by Atsushi Takeda began serialization on AlphaPolis's website in August 2017, and has been compiled into eleven volumes as of March 2026. An anime television series adaptation produced by Studio Flad aired from April to June 2026.

== Plot ==
The series follows Hibiki Manabe, a high school student who finds himself in another world after being blinded by a flash of light on the way to his classroom. Finding himself wandering in an open plain, without signs of his classmates, he finds him using appraising skills when encountering creatures. He then meets Emalia Steinbart, an older elf woman who takes care of him. The two form a party and recruit new members, while aiming to help Hibiki return home.

== Characters ==
Hibiki Manabe (真名部 響生, Manabe Hibiki)
Voiced by: Hisako Kanemoto
Hibiki is a 16-year-old high school boy who was suddenly brought into the Kingdom of Habrastia. His job is "Appraiser", which grants him the ability to analyze the skills and traits of monsters and people. He obtains several high-ranked skills, including: "World Map", allowing to see himself and other creatures in surrounding area, "Medical Book", which contains extensive knowledge of healing and medical treatments, and "Perfect Heal", which, with enough magic power, can heal any near-fatal injuries. Due to his low magic power, his skill "Contract" allows him to use the magic power of others who agree to share it with him by entering a contract. He also possesses extremely rare divine skills: "Tutorial" and "Expert Eye", which are directly granted by the Chief God using a third of their power to do so, and "Grimoire", granted by the God of Magic.
Emalia Steinbart (エマリア・ステインバルト, Emaria Suteinbauruto)
Voiced by: Shizuka Itō
Emalia is a 56-year-old elf woman who can hear the voice of spirits which led her to Hibiki. Her job is "Spirit Archer", which lets her create arrows out of wind. Her shirt constantly pops open and reveals her chest because of her larger breasts, much to her embarrassment.
Claude Abras (クロード, Kurōdo)
Voiced by: Kenta Miyake
Claude is a 26-year-old black wolf beastman and Lilian's protector. His initial job was "Knight", but his current job is "Hero". He was severely maimed after protecting Lilian and his actions are restricted due to invisible curse chains. After hiring him as a bodyguard, Hibiki heals Claude's injuries with Lilian's help, and uses his technical skill "Relief Measure" to partially lift his curse. He swears a loyalty oath to Hibiki and is aware of him being from another world.
Lilian Rouge (リリアン, Ririran)
Voiced by: Lamalfa Michelle Tateyama
Lilian is a ten-year-old girl in the care of Claude. When she turns 15, her job is to be "Sage". She was shunned by her family and sold for collateral due to her having the skill "Raging Sanctury", which gives her uncontrollable magic power due to a trial put on by the God of magic.
Vene (ヴェネ, Vu~ene)
Voiced by: Yukina Shuto
Vene is a small white cat connected to Hibiki's "Grimoire" skill that was sent by the God of Magic to help Lilian with controlling her magic power. Through Hibiki's skill "Summon Sacred Beast", Vene can transform into a giant monstrous cat for a short amount of time.
Ivel (イヴェル, Ivu~eru)
Voiced by: Yoko Hikasa
Ivel is a female adventurer who initially travels with Emalia to the elven homeland for her own purposes. She is revealed to be working for someone with nefarious intentions and was responsible for severing Claude's limbs before he met Hibiki.
Steelia (スティーリア, Sutīria)
Voiced by: Sora Tokui
An elf maid who is acquainted with Emalia. She has an unhealthy obsession with Emalia's breasts.
Shushin (主神)
Voiced by: Kazuyuki Okitsu
Majin (魔神)
Voiced by: Akiho Suzumoto
Meijin (冥神)
Voiced by: Chiemi Tanaka
Sapo-chan (サポちゃん)
Voiced by: Yukari Tamura
Sapo-chan is an artificial voice attached to the "Tutorial" skill that only Hibiki can hear. It provides him with in-depth stats and knowledge about his skills and the world after appearing in Habrastia. He chooses to give it the name of "Sapo-chan", which it gladly accepts.
Tanya (ターニャ, Tānya)
Voiced by: Yurika Kubo
Bals (バルス, Barusu)
Voiced by: Taiten Kusunoki
Bals is the Guild Master of the Adventurer's Guild. While reliable in his role at times, he tends to be enthusiastic about muscles.
Jewel (ジュエル, Jueru)
Voiced by: Rie Hikisaka
Jewel is the beastwoman receptionist and Vice Guild Master of the Adventurer's Guild. She is composed and professional while operating the Guild, but when dealing with Bals, she is much more strict with his antics.

== Media ==
=== Light novel ===
Written by Atekichi, the series was originally posted as a web novel on the online service AlphaPolis on August 31, 2016. It won the Excellence Award at AlphaPolis's 9th Fantasy Novel Award. AlphaPolis began publishing it as a light novel in 2017, releasing the first novel on March 1 of that year. Nine volumes have been released as of March 2026.

| No. | Release date | ISBN |
|---|---|---|
| 1 | March 1, 2017 | 978-4-434-23014-1 |
| 2 | August 3, 2017 | 978-4-434-23611-2 |
| 3 | January 5, 2018 | 978-4-434-24118-5 |
| 4 | June 3, 2018 | 978-4-434-24673-9 |
| 5 | November 4, 2018 | 978-4-434-25288-4 |
| 6 | April 3, 2019 | 978-4-434-25800-8 |
| 7 | February 28, 2025 | 978-4-434-35425-0 |
| 8 | October 30, 2025 | 978-4-434-36634-5 |
| 9 | March 30, 2026 | 978-4-434-37507-1 |

=== Manga ===
A manga adaptation began serialization illustrated by Atsushi Takeda began serialization on AlphaPolis' website on August 15, 2017. The first tankōbon volume was released on February 28, 2018; eleven volumes have been released as of March 2026. The manga is published in English on AlphaPolis' Alpha Manga website.

| No. | Original release date | Original ISBN | English release date | English ISBN |
|---|---|---|---|---|
| 1 | February 28, 2018 | 978-4-434-24189-5 | September 27, 2024 | — |
| 2 | October 31, 2018 | 978-4-434-25120-7 | September 27, 2024 | — |
| 3 | February 29, 2020 | 978-4-434-27029-1 | September 27, 2024 | — |
| 4 | October 31, 2020 | 978-4-434-28013-9 | March 21, 2025 | — |
| 5 | July 31, 2021 | 978-4-434-29132-6 | October 24, 2025 | — |
| 6 | March 31, 2022 | 978-4-434-30100-1 | March 27, 2026 | — |
| 7 | November 30, 2022 | 978-4-434-31171-0 | March 27, 2026 | — |
| 8 | October 31, 2023 | 978-4-434-32828-2 | April 24, 2026 | — |
| 9 | June 30, 2024 | 978-4-434-34057-4 | — | — |
| 10 | March 31, 2025 | 978-4-434-35483-0 | — | — |
| 11 | March 31, 2026 | 978-4-434-37500-2 | — | — |
| 12 | June 30, 2026 | 978-4-434-37963-5 | — | — |

=== Anime ===
An anime television series adaptation was announced on October 20, 2025. It is produced by NBCUniversal Entertainment Japan, animated by Studio Flad and directed by Makoto Hoshino, with Megumi Shimizu handling series composition as well as episode screenplays, and Mihoko Ogawa and Yoshie Matsumoto designing the characters. The series aired from April 4 to June 20, 2026, on Tokyo MX and other networks. The opening theme song is "Compass wa Tōmei" (コンパスは透明, Kompasu wa Tōmei; lit. 'Compass is Clear'), performed by Ryushen, while the ending theme song is "Mō Iikai?" (もーいーかい？; lit. 'Are You Ready?'), performed by Phantom Siita. Crunchyroll is streaming the series.

==== Episodes ====
| No. | Title | Directed by | Written by | Storyboarded by | Original release date |
|---|---|---|---|---|---|
| 1 | "The Tutorial Is Already Running"; Transliteration: "Chūtoriaru wa Sudeni Kōshi Sarete Imasu" (Japanese: チュートリアルは既に行使されています) | Makoto Hoshino | Megumi Shimizu | Makoto Hoshino | April 4, 2026 (Note: Episode 1 was released on ABEMA, dAnime Store and Crunchyroll 4 days before its televised airing.) |
Hibiki Manabe is transported to another world from school and is running away from a Horn Rabbit. When it stabs his backpack, he falls backwards on top of it and kills it. After that, he takes a moment to assess his skills as an Appraiser and uses the World Map skill to find a town. When Hibiki reaches a road, he is about to be attacked by a canine monster, but Emalia kills it in time to save him. The two of them camp for the night, and Emalia teaches Hibiki about the Kingdom of Habrastia. As they are heading to town, Hibiki detects a Crystal Horn Rabbit in the area and Emalia heads to it with Hibiki, hoping to impress him with her skills. After a failed attempt to defeat it, Hibiki and Emalia work together to kill it. Meanwhile, an adventurer named Ivel registers at the Adventurer's Guild and decides to look for a 'certain something'.
| 2 | "I'd Advise Against Solo Combat"; Transliteration: "Tandoku Sentō wa o Susume Shimasen" (Japanese: 単独戦闘はお勧めしません) | Chen Linying | Megumi Shimizu | Makoto Hoshino | April 11, 2026 (Note: From Episode 2, episodes are released on ABEMA, dAnime Store and Crunchyroll a week before their televised airings.) |
Hibiki and Emalia arrive in the town of Lowell. Emalia warns Hibiki to be careful with how he acts, so someone doesn't take advantage of him. They arrive at the Adventurer's Guild and are greeted by Jewel. Hibiki meets Bals, the Guild Master, and becomes fascinated with his muscles, much to the chagrin of Emalia and Jewel. Emalia negotiates 700 gold coins from the guild's budget, causing Jewel to scold Bals. Emalia receives a request from her hometown and has to leave. On the way there, she runs into Ivel and they travel together, meeting the maid Styria along the way. Hibiki spends time at the Guild while staying at an Inn. A few days later, Jewel's brother Jade comes in wounded from poison. Hibiki heals him with help from Jewel and other adventurers, and passes out. When he recovers, Jewel thanks him and warns him about his abilities in order to avoid drawing attention to himself. She suggests he hire a bodyguard and he agrees with the idea. Meanwhile, in a dark cell somewhere, a beastman promises a little girl that he will protect her.
| 3 | "This Is Unprecedented"; Transliteration: "Zendai Mimon desu" (Japanese: 前代未聞です) | Makoto Hoshino | Megumu Sasano | Makoto Hoshino | April 18, 2026 |
Hibiki visits the Debby Company in search of a bodyguard. The initial candidates aren't suitable for his needs, until he meets Claude, a beastman and Lilian, a human sage. After appraising them and learning of their skills, he hires them. Claude is initially hostile to him, but after Hibiki heals his wounds and partially lifts his curse (with Lilian's help), he has a change of heart and swears loyalty to him. On their way back to Lowell, Claude and Lilian learn that Hibiki is from another world and can speak to the gods. After learning this, Hibiki decides to help Lilian control her magic. Using the Grimoire skill, Hibiki summons Vene, a white magical cat. Hibiki and Lilian dote on its cuteness, not knowing that it makes Claude jealous. Meanwhile, Emalia, Ivel, and Styria are traveling and decide to stop at a hot spring. Styria tries to keep Emalia from being too friendly with Ivel, but Ivel says that they are friends.
| 4 | "Training Is the Only Way"; Transliteration: "Tokkun Aru Nomi Desu" (Japanese: 特訓あるのみです) | Chen Linying | Rie Koshika | Tetsuji Nakamura | April 25, 2026 |
Back in Lowell, Hibiki, Claude, Lilian and Vene buy some expensive gear. After that, they begin magic training with Vene. Lilian practices her power while Hibiki learns to control magic with help from Claude. During training, Hibiki catches a glimpes of Claude's past. Afterwards, Hibiki spends time cleaning at the inn, in the hopes of learning household magic, but his efforts bear no results. The next day, Claude teaches Hibiki how to use a bow while Lilian practices her magic. Then, they have a picnic until a Rushing Boar comes. Claude kills it in one shot and they clean the body. Hibiki learns Bubble Wash and uses it on Claude, which cleans his entire body. Meanwhile, Emalia, Styria and Ivel travel to a ruined fortress. Emalia and Styria are affected by illusion magic, and Ivel manages to dispel the illusion with her magic.
| 5 | "That Looks Absurdly Good on You"; Transliteration: "Ijou ni Niattemasu" (Japanese: 異常に似合ってます) | Jol-chan | Megumu Sasano | Makoto Hoshino | May 2, 2026 |
Hibiki, Claude, and Lilian form a party at the Guild to take on jobs and earn some money. Meanwhile, Emalia, Ivel and Styria are nearly at Fairnote and Emalia gives Ivel an amulet as a friendship gift. Back in Lowell, Hibiki's party meet up with Bals who return from the royal capital. Claude and Bals disagree on how to train Hibiki which leads to a fight, but it is cut short by Jewel. A feamle beastman thief steals Hibiki's money, so his party sets up a sting to catch them, only to fail. Hibiki follows the thief disguised as a girl, only to fall for her traps. She takes an interest in him, and has his appraise some items, one of which is a wristband from her deceased sister. As a thank you for deciphering the message, she returns his money to him. Back at the Inn, Bals informs Hibiki that a new party is making a name for themselves. At night, Hibiki expresses going on a journey to meet a sage in the hopes of returning to his world, which shocks Lilian and Claude. Just as Emalia's group arrives at Fairnote's border, Ivel suddenly leaves and heads back to Rowell.
| 6 | "I Recommend Using Summon Sacred Beast"; Transliteration: "Seijū Shōkan no Kōshi o Suishō Shimasu" (Japanese: 聖獣召喚の行使を推奨します) | Kim Won-ho | Rie Koshika | Ichizō Kobayashi | May 9, 2026 |
Hibiki, Claude and Lilian discuss their next steps on Hibiki returning home, though Lilian is sad that Hibiki wants to return to his world. Bals shows up and decides to train Hibiki, though he and Claude argue over the methods. Lilian watches and is joined by Tanya. After Hibiki's training, Jewel arrives and everyone relaxes in a hot spring. Afterwards at a campfire, Lilian gives Hibiki a drink that she made with Tanya's help and tells him her feelings. This mends the slight gap in their friendship. Meanwhile, Emalia is at home relaxing in a bath, and Styria pressures her into wearing a dress, which was part of the "urgent request" from her father. The next day, Hibiki's party meets Ivel while hunting and she sends them into a trap set up by a Silver Wolves. Hibiki gets injured and poisoned, forcing Lilian to escape with him while Claude fends off the wolves. Lilian and Hibiki are chased into a cave, and Lilian fends off the wolves until Hibiki recovers. He summons a Sacred Beast, which is Vene's true power, and the wolves are defeated. Hibiki gains Spririt Archery and they decide to rescue Claude.
| 7 | "Please Adhere to the Usage Instructions When Using It"; Transliteration: "Yōhō Yōryō o Mamotte Tadashiku Otsukai Kudasai" (Japanese: 用法用量を守って正しくお使いください) | Kazuma Satō | Megumi Shimisu | Makoto Hoshino | May 16, 2026 |
Hibiki, Lilian and Vene head back to Claude while fending off more wolves. Vene is suspicious of Ivel sending them into a trap. Meanwhile, Claude is weakened while Ivel watches from a distance. Claude realizes that someone from his past is controlling the Silver Diamond Wolf, much to his despair. Claude gets injured just as Hibiki, Lilian and Vene arrive, but they managed to save him. Hibiki heals Claude and, using a portion of his true stregnth, he single-handedly defeats the Wolf. Just as Claude explains about Anastasia, his former companion, Hibiki passes out. 2 days later, he awakens and decides to find a way to return home and bring Claude and Lilian with him. The Chief God discusses with the God of Magic about the recent experience, and when she leaves, he quietly regrets having dragged Hibiki into this world. Meanwhile, Emalia is attending a formal fete in her home organized by her father. It is revealed that First Prince Verdelis is a Hero and plans to strike down the Demon Lord and marry Emalia afterwards. When she learns this, she runs away from home to reunite with Hibiki. Meanwhile, Ivel contacts someone and vows to kill Claude.
| 8 | "Today's Temperature Is 39 Degrees"; Transliteration: "Honjitsu Kion wa 39-do Desu" (Japanese: 本日気温は39度です) | Chen Linying | Megumu Sasano | Tetsuji Nakamura | May 23, 2026 |
Hibiki is at the inn, reminiscing about his friends. Claude, Lilian, and Vene reassure him that he'll see them again soon. He takes comfort in the advice and them as well. The next day, Bals and Jewel discuss the reward for Hibiki's party defeating the wolf. With the money they earn, Hibiki's party heads to the Debby Company to buy new gear and request a carriage to get to the northern dungeon. While waiting on the carriage, Hibiki lifts more of Claude's curse, restoring more of his strength. Later on, a heat wave hits the city of Lowell. Claude gets so hot, Hibiki suggests he cut his fur, which startles him. Lilian and Vene come with the idea of water balloons to cool everyone down. Afterwards, Hibiki goes into town and learns from Ajarathan Debby about The Cloak of Everlasting Spring. With help from Jewel, he gets three made for him, Claude and Lilian. When he returns, Lilian and Claude have made sweets and black tea for him. The next day, the party leaves Lowell in their carriage and heads to the Northern Dungeon. Meanwhile, it is revealed that the party called the Corpse Killers are Hibiki's friends and his cousin as they were transported to the world as well. After rescuing civilians from Undead, they continue to search for Hibiki.
| 9 | "Acquired Master of Walking Into Traps"; Transliteration: "Wana Hamari Masutā o Shutoku Shimashita" (Japanese: 罠ハマりマスターを取得しました) | Jol-chan | Rie Koshika | Tetsuji Nakamura | May 30, 2026 |
| 10 | "I Cannot Answer That Kind of Question"; Transliteration: "Sōiu Rui no Shitsumon ni wa Okotae Deki Kanemasu" (Japanese: そういう類の質問にはお答えできかねます) | Chen Linying | Megumi Shimizu | Ichizō Kobayashi | June 6, 2026 |
| 11 | "This Just Barely Isn't Cheating"; Transliteration: "Girigiri Zurude wa Arimasen" (Japanese: ぎりぎりズルではありません) | Satoshi Takafuji | Megumi Shimizu | Satoshi Takafuji | June 13, 2026 |
| 12 | "The Connection Isn't Severed"; Transliteration: "Tsunagari wa Kiete Imasen" (Japanese: 繋がりは消えていません) | Makoto Hoshino | Megumi Shimizu | Makoto Hoshino | June 20, 2026 |

== See also ==
- Heroine? Saint? No, I'm an All-Works Maid (and Proud of It)!, another light novel series with the same writer
