= Ran (Urusei Yatsura) =

Fictional character from Urusei Yatsura

- Urusei Yatsura character
- Ran, as depicted in a promotional artwork for the 2022 Urusei Yatsura TV series
- First appearance: Urusei Yatsura chapter 55: "Sports Festival Close Call" (Note: 体育祭危機一髪…, Taiikusai Kikiippatsu...) (October 1980)
- Created by: Rumiko Takahashi
- Voiced by: Japanese: Yō Inoue (1981 TV series, episodes 18–103); Kazue Komiya (1981 TV series, episodes 104–194); Kana Hanazawa (2022 TV series); English: Donna Bella Litton (2022 TV series)

Ran (Note: Japanese: ラン) is a fictional character appearing in the Japanese manga series Urusei Yatsura, created by Rumiko Takahashi. The character made her first appearance in the 55th chapter of the series, which was first published in Japan in Shogakukan's Weekly Shōnen Sunday magazine on October 22, 1980. In Urusei Yatsura, Ran is portrayed as an alien with a bipolar personality who grew up as childhood friends with the Oni alien Lum, for whom Ran developed a one-sided rivalry after years of resentment towards her.

In the anime adaptations of Urusei Yatsura, the character was initially voiced in Japanese by Yō Inoue and then by Kazue Komiya in the 1981 TV series, and by Kana Hanazawa in the 2022 TV series, while Donna Bella Litton provides her voice in English.

== Creation and development ==
The character of Ran was created by Rumiko Takahashi, author of the Urusei Yatsura manga series, making her first appearance in its 55th chapter, titled "Sports Festival Close Call", which was first published in Shogakukan's Weekly Shōnen Sunday magazine on October 22, 1980. Takahashi stated that, when creating the character, she was inspired by gaki, which in Japanese Buddhism are the spirits of envious and greedy people who, as punishment for their vices in life, were cursed with an insatiable hunger for the life force of humans, an aspect that Takahashi embodied in Ran as the vampiric power to suck the youth and vitality out of people by kissing them.

Takahashi named the character "Ran" due to its double meaning – translatable as "orchid" and "civil war", respectively – both of which the author felt suited the character's bipolar personality; this, in turn, causes Ran's behavior to continually change, going from friendly and pleasant to cruel and aggressive in an instant. Regarding Ran's design, Takahashi portrayed her as a teenage girl with pink, curly hair resembling a cloud, which the author associated with the belief that a gaki has an insubstantial form. The author also incorporated features such as fangs and pointed ears into Ran's design to tie her into the image of an oni. For the character's clothing, Takahashi simply drew Ran in either a pink dress underneath a white apron or a silver bikini.

During a July 2022 interview, Japanese voice actress Kana Hanazawa commented on Ran's appeal, stating: "Ran is a girl with a split personality, one where she is in an extreme flirtatious mode and another where she is extremely demanding, so I think what's really charming about her is that you never get tired of watching her!" Hanazawa also spoke about her approach to voicing Ran, relating that her goal was for her performance to suit the character's personality, saying: "She has a reason for her flirting and anger, so I thought it would be good if she could be played powerfully while staying close to her feelings, I think."

== Appearances ==
=== In Urusei Yatsura ===
Ran is an alien of unspecified race and planet. During her childhood, Ran became best friends with the Oni alien Lum, with whom she attended elementary school along with the fellow aliens Benten and Oyuki. Around that time, Ran was often hurt or got into trouble because of the antics of the more carefree and irresponsible Lum. The two were also both in love with Rei, who became Lum's fiancé. For these reasons, Ran comes to Earth in order to get revenge against Lum.^{[ch. 55]} By enrolling in Tomobiki High and pretending to be human, Ran plans to steal Lum's fiancé, Ataru Moroboshi, from her, just so she can kiss him and drain his youth away.^{[ch. 55]} However, after finally managing to do so, it fails due to a youth potion that Ataru accidentally takes. From then on, Ran changes tactics to getting revenge 'directly' on Lum, usually dragging in everyone nearby as well; these bouts of revenge are usually triggered by her calm and friendly reminiscing of the past leading her to remember something unpleasant. Ran lives in her spaceship that she parks on Earth and is an excellent cook, always hoping that the way to Rei's heart is through his stomach.

Over the course of the series, Ran finds herself involved in various abnormal, unusual and otherworldly situations along with the rest of the manga's colorful cast of characters. These situations include: Ran hanging out with Ryunosuke Fujinami in an attempt to teach her how to become more feminine, only for people to mistakenly believe that Ran is interested in girls; and Ran trying to prevent Ataru from crashing a party she – along with Lum, Shinobu Miyake, Sakura, Benten, Ryoko Mendo, Ryunosuke and Oyuki – were hosting in an old-fashioned sentō.

=== In other media ===
In addition to the manga series, Ran was also featured in its 1981 anime television series adaptation, in which she was voiced by Yō Inoue until episode 103, with Kazue Komiya succeeding Inoue as Ran's voice actress for the remainder of the anime. Additionally, the outfit Ran wears in the penultimate opening of the original series was based on that of the character Maris from Takahashi's one-shot manga Maris the Chojo (1980). The character also made an appearance in the animated theatrical film Urusei Yatsura: Remember My Love (1985). In the 1988 "Raging Sherbet" OVA, Ran, along with Lum and Benten, decide to temporarily leave Earth in order to take a summer vacation with Oyuki to her home planet Neptune, where they learn about its native bird species Sherbet, which produce icy treats on demand. In the 2005 "Catch the Heart" OVA, Ran receives a heart-shaped candy from a mischievous spirit that causes a magical heart to appear over the head of whoever eats it. Hanazawa currently voices the character in the 2022 anime television series adaptation of Urusei Yatsura.

== Reception ==
Ran is considered to be one of the most popular Urusei Yatsura characters among fans of the series. In October 2019, NHK released the results of a popularity poll on the "Favorite Rumiko Takahashi Characters" list, with Ran ranked at 20th place. In August 2021, it was reported that a new perfume line produced by Fairytail Parfum would be launched next September, with each fragrance inspired by a character from Urusei Yatsura; Ran's perfume, which cost 1,320 yen, was described as "a feminine blend of flowers and berries with a romantic last note of sandalwood and vanilla". In April 2022, Dave Carl Cutler of Comic Book Resources ranked Ran 10th on the "Top 10 Rumiko Takahashi Waifus" list.

Cutler commented that while Ran's "selfish and petty nature" made her seem like a "boring" character at first glance, he noted that "it is that same pettiness that makes her shine", stating: "Nothing is as tame as simply nice. That is not what Urusei Yatsura is about. The whole show is about self-centered characters constantly causing mayhem because of their personality flaws. In that framework, Ran really shines. Ran's presence requires attention and many will be happy to give it." Danny Guan of Game Rant praised the character's dual personality and her relationship with Lum, writing: "[Ran's] two-faced demeanor that switches between adorable and vicious is a sight to behold, and her dynamic with Lum is one of the funniest in the series. Out of Lum's many childhood friends, her relationship with Ran is easily the most hilarious and ridiculous."

== See also ==
- List of Urusei Yatsura characters
