= Chivalry of a Failed Knight =

2013 Japanese light novel series

- Cover of the light novel volume 1, featuring Stella Vermillion

落第騎士の英雄譚(キャバルリィ) (Rakudai Kishi no Kyabaruryi)
- Genre: Action, fantasy, romance
- Light novel
- Written by: Riku Misora
- Illustrated by: Won
- Published by: SB Creative
- English publisher: NA: Sol Press (former); J-Novel Club (current)
- Imprint: GA Bunko
- Original run: July 15, 2013 – December 15, 2023
- Volumes: 19 (Note: Twenty light novels in total have been released including Volume 0.)
- Manga
- Written by: Riku Misora
- Illustrated by: Megumi Soramichi
- Published by: Square Enix
- Magazine: Gangan Online
- Original run: March 4, 2014 – December 7, 2017
- Volumes: 11
- Manga

Chivalry of a Failed Knight Anthology feat. Stella
- Written by: Various artists
- Published by: Square Enix
- Magazine: GA Bunko Magazine
- Published: December 13, 2014
- Volumes: 1
- Anime television series
- Directed by: Shin Oonuma; Jin Tamamura
- Written by: Shogo Yasukawa
- Music by: Kōtarō Nakagawa
- Studio: Silver Link; Nexus
- Licensed by: AUS: Madman Entertainment; BI: MVM Entertainment; NA: Sentai Filmworks
- Original network: AT-X, Tokyo MX, TV Aichi, Sun TV, BS11
- Original run: October 3, 2015 – December 19, 2015
- Episodes: 12
- icon

Chivalry of a Failed Knight (Japanese: 落第騎士の英雄譚(キャバルリィ), Hepburn: Rakudai Kishi no Kyabaruryi; lit. "The Heroic Tales of the Failure Knight", also known by the English title A Tale of Worst One in the anime version) is a Japanese light novel series written by Riku Misora and illustrated by Won. It was published in nineteen volumes released from July 2013 to December 2023. The story is set in a fantasy world where the titular "failed knight" Ikki Kurogane meets Stella Vermillion, who is considered a prodigy. The two make up for each other's weaknesses and form a relationship while training to become great knights. A manga adaptation was published from March 2014 to December 2017. An anime adaptation produced by Silver Link and Nexus aired from October to December 2015.

The light novels have sold 1.5 million print copies by February 2017.

== Plot ==
In an alternate Earth, humans called "Blazers" have supernatural abilities. These Blazers can materialize weapons known as a "Device" which are made through a person's soul. At Hagun Academy (破軍学園, Hagun Gakuen), Blazers are selected as representatives for the Seven Star Sword Art Festival, an annual tournament event held by the seven Mage Knight Academies in Japan to determine the strongest Apprentice Knight. Hagun's performance ranking in the festival is falling and the academy's director, Kurono Shinguji, is determined to find a solution to the problem. Ikki Kurogane is the academy's F-Rank Blazer and is considered "The Worst One" for his low magical abilities, but Stella Vermillion, the princess of the European country Vermillion, is one of the top A-Rank Blazers.

On Stella's first day at Hagun Academy, she is assigned to share a room with Ikki as a transfer student of the academy. When Ikki inadvertently discovers Stella half-dressed, he is challenged to duel where the loser has to be obedient to the winner for life. She ends up losing the duel, but they agree to become roommates as Ikki's one and only merciful desire. The series follows their adventures as they train to qualify as the school's representatives for the festival.

== Characters ==
=== Hagun Academy ===
==== Main characters ====
Ikki Kurogane (黒鉄 一輝, Kurogane Ikki)
Voiced by: Ryōta Ōsaka (Japanese); Clint Bickham (English)
Ikki is an F-Rank Blazer who is widely known as the Worst One (落第騎士(ワーストワン), Wāsuto Wan). A member of the distinguished Kurogane Family, Ikki was subjected to ill treatment from his own family since childhood; however, his great-grandfather, Ryoma Kurogane, a legendary Blazer and hero, encouraged Ikki to never give up and become strong, after which he continued to work hard on his craft. Due to his family's influence on the school coupled with less-than-average grades (due to his low magical abilities), he was forced to repeat a year; however, when the school administration changed, along with the academic standards, Ikki was able to more fully participate, with the condition that he would be unable to graduate if he failed at the Seven Star tournament or even failed to qualify. He relies on learning his opponents' skills and tactics, a technique called "Blade Steal". Later, he unlocks stronger version of this ability called "Perfect Vision" which allows him to predict his opponents' thoughts and moves. His Device is Intetsu and his Noble Art is Ittō Shura (一刀修羅), where he pushes his skills and abilities beyond what the human body would limit. At the start of the series, he is challenged by Stella in a duel where the loser has to obey the winner. Although he wins the duel, his main order is that he and Stella become roommates and get along.^{LN 1 ch. 1} After defeating his past-year rival, Shizuya Kirihara, Ikki receives a new nickname, Another One (無冠の剣王(アナザーワン), Anazāwan). Although he attracts the affections of many girls,^{LN 1 ch. 2} he and Stella eventually develop a relationship. Despite vicious interference from Kurogane family members, Ikki qualifies as a Hagun Academy representative and he and Stella become engaged.^{Ch. 31}
Stella Vermillion (ステラ・ヴァーミリオン, Sutera Vāmirion)
Voiced by: Shizuka Ishigami (Japanese); Luci Christian (English)
The main heroine of the series, Stella is a red-haired A-Rank Blazer who is considered to be a once-in-a-decade genius. Her Device is Laevateinn and her Noble Art is Katharterio Salamandra (天壌焼き焦がす竜王の焔(カルサリティオ・サラマンドラ), Karusaritio Saramandora). The second princess of the Vermillion Kingdom (a small European country), Stella could not control her own powers as a child and was badly burned each time she tried to use them. Through her effort, she eventually mastered her own power and is widely regarded as a genius by those around her. Not wanting to become conceited, Stella then decided to transfer to Japan. At the start of the story, she challenges Ikki to a duel where the loser must obey the winner, but she loses. Although they agree to be roommates, Stella feels it is her noble's obligation to treat him as a master.^{LN 1 ch 1} She is immediately jealous of other girls being affectionate towards Ikki,^{Ch. 3-5} and over the course of the series, she falls in love with Ikki. They eventually become a couple and get engaged after both she and Ikki qualify for the Seven Star tournament.^{Ch. 31}
Shizuku Kurogane (黒鉄 珠雫, Kurogane Shizuku)
Voiced by: Nao Tōyama (Japanese); Juliet Simmons (English)
Ikki's younger sister who is extremely obsessed with him.^{Ch. 4} She has white hair, unlike her brother, who has black hair. Nicknamed Lorelei (深海の魔女(ローレライ), Rōrerai), a B-Rank Blazer who excels in magic control. Her Device is Yoishigure and her Noble Arts include Shōha Suiren (障波水蓮), Water Prison Orb (水牢弾, Suirōdan), Hisuijin (緋水刃).^{Ch. 4} and Aoiro Rinna (青色輪廻). Shizuku hates her family for their treatment of Ikki and generally dislikes holding the family name.^{Ch. 5} She initially disapproved of Ikki's relationship with Stella, but eventually accepted her and decided to take it upon herself to teach Stella about being a bride of the Kurogane family, though she still made up her own restricting rules. Originally, she was an odds-on favorite to qualify as a Hagun Academy representative to the Seven Star tournament, but is eliminated during the qualifying matches.
Nagi Arisuin (有栖院凪, Arisuin Nagi)
Voiced by: Shintarō Asanuma (Japanese); Chris Patton (English)
Nicknamed "Alice", Arisuin is a first year student and Shizuku's roommate. She is described as "a maiden who was born into the body of a man", and in the English translation, female pronouns are used to refer to her. Nicknamed Black Sonia, she has the ability to control shadows with her device, the Darkness Hermit. Her Noble Arts include Shadow Bind (影縫い), Shadow Walk (日陰道) and Shadow Spot. She is a good friend of Shizuku, who opens up to her. She is later revealed to be an assassin of the terrorist organization Rebellion as well as a member of Akatsuki, which infiltrated Hagun Academy. She had a dark past, being an orphan who lost her friend Yuuri, and was taken into Rebellion by Wallenstein. In Chapter 36, she attacked Newspaper Club member Kagami and stole her research when she started to uncover evidence of the existence of Akatsuki. However, she turned against Rebellion, due to her friendship with Shizuku.

==== Student Council ====
Toka Todo (東堂刀華, Tōdō Tōka)
Voiced by: Hisako Kanemoto (Japanese); Stephanie Wittels (English)
Tohka is a third year student, the president of the Hagun student council, and the strongest student of the school, being one of the 4 strongest student knights in Japan. She has long light brown hair and wears glasses. She has the nickname Raikiri, and is a B-rank knight with the ability to manipulate lightning. Her Device is a katana named Narukami and her Noble Arts are Raikiri (雷切), Reverse Sight (閃理眼), Shippu Jinrai (疾風迅雷) and Takemikazuchi. She is a nice person, caring a lot about others. She was raised in an orphanage, due to her parents having died to an illness. She is famed for her Noble Art Raikiri, which is a slash powered by lightning, that is believed to be invincible. Despite her final qualifying match being used as a tool by the Kurogane family via the Magic Knight Federation to avoid Ikki's qualification to the Seven Star Sword Art Festival, she nonetheless presented a fair match against him, in which she fell defeated after a sword unsheathing duel.
Utakata Misogi (御祓 泡沫, Misogi Utakata)
Voiced by: Megumi Han (Japanese); Kalin Coates (English)
Utakata is a third-year student and the vice-president of the student council. He is a small boy with white hair. His nickname is Fifty-Fifty, a D-Rank knight. His Noble Art is Black Box, which lets him alter the outcomes of events through probability. He is very playful, and an old friend of Tohka and Kanata.
Renren Tomaru (兎丸恋々, Tomaru Renren)
Voiced by: M·A·O (Japanese); Tiffany Grant (English)
Renren is a second-year student and the general affairs manager of the student council. She has short hair and is rather short. Nicknamed Runner's High, and is C-Ranked, having the ability to accumulate her own acceleration. She is the third strongest student of Hagun Academy.
Kanata Totokubara (貴徳原カナタ, Totokubara Kanata)
Voiced by: Yoko Hikasa (Japanese); Shelley Calene-Black (English)
Kanata is a third-year student, and the treasurer of the student council, who is considered the second strongest student of Hagun Academy. She has long blonde hair, and wears a long white dress. She is nicknamed Scharlach Frau, and is a B-Ranked Knight, being able to turn her rapier Device into diamonds which she can control. Kanata is also an old friend of Tohka and Utakata.

==== Other students ====
Ayase Ayatsuji (綾辻 絢瀬, Ayatsuji Ayase)
Voiced by: Yū Kobayashi (Japanese); Chelsea Ryan McCurdy (English)
A third-year student of Hagun Academy and the daughter of a famous swordsman named Kaito Ayatsuji. Ayase approaches Ikki and asks for his guidance to improve her swordsmanship. Two years prior to the current story, her father fought against Kuraudo, a Blazer from Tonrou Academy, with their dojo on the line and ended up in a coma with the dojo being taken over by Kuraudo. After this event, Ayase constantly challenged Kuraudo, but to no avail. She hoped to enter the Seven Star Sword Art Festival to have a chance to get the dojo back to the point where she was willing to use any means possible, even cheating, to win. In her qualifying match against Ikki, who had been teaching her swordsmanship and by that time considered her a friend, she secretly rigged the arena to ensure her victory, but Ikki, who suspected her intentions, not only refused to expose her cheating but also defeated her.^{Ch. 17} Later, he defeated Kuraudo at the dojo to regain its ownership for Ayase.^{Ch. 19} Ayase confessed her cheating to the school authorities, earning her a suspension and elimination from Seven Star Sword Art Festival contention, and her father emerged from his coma.^{Ch. 20}
Shizuya Kirihara (桐原 静矢, Kirihara Shizuya)
Voiced by: Yoshitsugu Matsuoka (Japanese); Blake Shepard (English)
Kirihara is a second-year student. His nickname is the Hunter, and is a popular C-Rank knight. His Device is a bow called Oborotsuki, and his Noble Arts are Area Invisibility (狩人の森) and Million Rain (驟雨烈光閃). He is an arrogant and sadistic person, who bullied Ikki during his first year due to his status as, the worst one. In his match against Ikki, he tormented him by mocking him, and getting the crowd on his side to mock him, but they were silenced by Stella. Ikki pulled off a turnabout, and defeated Kirihara, who passed out from fear of pain. He is not seen again after his defeat, but it is likely he has lost his popularity.

=== Kurogane Family ===
Itsuki Kurogane (黒鉄 巌, Kurogane Itsuki)
Voiced by: Show Hayami (Japanese); David Matranga (English)
The chief of the International Mage Knight Federation - Japan branch. Ikki and Shizuku's father. He cares more for the prestige of the Kurogane family than for his children's actual welfare and well-being.
Ouma Kurogane (黒鉄 王馬, Kurogane Ōma)
Ikki's older brother. He is a member of Akatsuki. His alias is Kaze no kentei (風の剣帝). He is ranked A. Ouma has little interest in anything besides fighting strong opponents to test the limits of his strength. His younger brother, Ikki, described Ouma as an incredibly stoic person who is only interested in becoming stronger.

=== Other Blazers ===
"Twin-Wings" Edelweiss (エーデルワイス, Ēderuwaisu)
The top-ranking Blazer in the world. Edelweiss is a criminal whose capture has been given up on due to her immense strength. She is also one of the few Desperado (or Majin) in the world. She has taken an interest in Ikki Kurogane after their first fight, telling Kurono Shinguuji to tell Ikki to become a worthy opponent for next time they meet.
Yūdai Moroboshi (諸星 雄大, Moroboshi Yūdai)
A blond haired guy with a black hairband. He is a third-year student and crowned Sword King in the 61st Seven Stars Festival. He has a younger sister who blames his injuries to her fault, which led her aphasia. To cure younger sister and himself, Yudai became stronger than before and find himself as Sword King in Seven Stars.
Kuraudo Kurashiki (倉敷 蔵人, Kurashiki Kuraudo)
Voiced by: Yoshimasa Hosoya (Japanese); Andrew Love (English)
The ace of Tonrō Academy. A C-Rank Blazer nicknamed the Sword Eater (剣士殺し(ソードイーター), Sōdo Ītā) due to having defeated many swordsmen. He was in the top 8 at the previous years Seven Star Battle Festival. When Ikki defeats him, he returns the dojo ownership to Ayase's family.

== Production ==
After winning an award for his previous light novel series Danzai no Exceed, Riku Misora decided to write a sport-related novel in the vein of Akamitsu Awamura's Mugen no Linkage.

== Media ==
=== Light novels ===
The original release of the series was in a light novel format, which was written by Riku Misora and illustrated by Won. Chivalry of a Failed Knight had been published by SB Creative's GA Bunko imprint since July 16, 2013. In December 2021, Misora stated that the final volume of the series is set to be released before the end of 2022. The series ended with the nineteenth volume, released on December 15, 2023. Sol Press acquired the license to the series and released the first three volumes in English on November 16, 2019. They released five volumes in total before going defunct. On November 17, 2023, J-Novel Club announced at Anime NYC that they licensed the series for English publication.

No.	Original release date	Original ISBN	English release date	English ISBN
1	July 13, 2013	978-4-7973-7468-1	November 16, 2019 (SP); February 28, 2024 (JNC)	978-1-948838-20-7 (SP); 978-1-718347-12-0 (JNC)
2	October 15, 2013	978-4-7973-7548-0	November 16, 2019 (SP); June 28, 2024 (JNC)	978-1-948838-22-1 (SP); 978-1-718347-14-4 (JNC)
3	January 15, 2014	978-4-7973-7641-8	November 16, 2019 (SP); September 27, 2024 (JNC)	978-1-948838-24-5 (SP); 978-1-718347-16-8 (JNC)
4	April 15, 2014	978-4-7973-7720-0	July 6, 2020 (SP); January 24, 2025 (JNC)	978-1-948838-32-0 (SP); 978-1-718347-18-2 (JNC)
5	August 12, 2014	978-4-7973-7754-5	December 28, 2020 (SP); April 11, 2025 (JNC)	978-1-948838-34-4 (SP); 978-1-718347-20-5 (JNC)
6	December 15, 2014	978-4-7973-8031-6	June 20, 2025	978-1-718347-22-9
0	March 14, 2015	978-4-7973-8290-7	November 17, 2025	978-1-718347-30-4
7	May 15, 2015	978-4-7973-8352-2	September 2, 2025	978-1-7183-4724-3
8	October 15, 2015	978-4-7973-8470-3	January 27, 2026	978-1-7183-4726-7
9	December 15, 2015	978-4-7973-8514-4	April 21, 2026	978-1-7183-4728-1
10	April 15, 2016	978-4-7973-8731-5	June 25, 2026	978-1-7183-4710-6
11	January 14, 2017	978-4-7973-8943-2	September 10, 2026	978-1-7183-4732-8
12	April 15, 2017	978-4-7973-9198-5	December 15, 2026	978-1-7183-4734-2
13	October 13, 2017	978-4-7973-9317-0	—	—
14	April 12, 2018	978-4-7973-9586-0	—	—
15	October 15, 2018	978-4-7973-9901-1	—	—
16	April 15, 2019	978-4-8156-0244-4	—	—
17	November 14, 2019	978-4-8156-0382-3	—	—
18	June 12, 2020	978-4-8156-0643-5	—	—
19	December 15, 2023	978-4-8156-2166-7	—	—

=== Manga ===
The series was adapted into a manga that was illustrated by Megumu Soramichi and printed in the monthly manga magazine Monthly Shonen Gangan from 2014 to 2017. It was collected in eleven tankōbon volumes. An anthology manga volume illustrated by various artists was published on December 13, 2014.

No.	Japanese release date	Japanese ISBN
1	December 13, 2014	978-4-7575-4493-2
Chapter 1. The Genius Knight and The Failure Knight; Chapter 2. The Reason to Fight; Chapter 3. The Visitor from the Past; Chapter 4. Maiden's Battle
2	March 2015	978-4-7575-4605-9
Chapter 5. Nagi Arisuin; Chapter 6. Rebellion; Chapter 7. Debut Battle; Chapter 8. Knight's Pride
3	May 14, 2015	978-4-7575-4637-0
Chapter 9. Total Control; Chapter 10. Moonlight Vow; Chapter 11. Before the Storm; Chapter 12. Apprentice; Chapter 13. Happiness' Form
4	October 14, 2015	978-4-7575-4755-1
Chapter 14. Second Step; Chapter 15. Twilight of Disaster; Chapter 16. Father and Daughter
5	December 12, 2015	978-4-7575-4824-4
Chapter 17. Swordsmen's pride; Chapter 18. Failure Knight vs Sword Eater; Chapter 19. A Knight's Long-held Desire; Chapter 20. An Icy Smile; Extra. Memories of Summer
6	April 14, 2016	978-4-7575-4944-9
Chapter 21. Shizuku's Challenge; Chapter 22. After the Battle; Chapter 23. The Feelings Between Them; Chapter 24. Their Future
7	October 14, 2016	978-4-7575-5091-9
Chapter 25. Mystery at Okutama; Chapter 26. Messenger From the Other Side; Chapter 27. Worst One Under Siege; Chapter 28. Father and Son
8	January 12, 2017	978-4-7575-5216-6
Chapter 29. Arranged Duel; Chapter 30. Facing The Darkness; Chapter 31. Crownless Sword King; Chapter 32. Entrusted Feelings
9	June 14, 2017	978-4-7575-5340-8
Chapter 33. Training Camp; Chapter 34. Encounter; Chapter 35. Amane Shinomiya; Chapter 36. Plot Maneuver; Chapter 37. Older Sister and Younger Sister
10	October 12, 2017	978-4-7575-5496-2
Chapter 38. Outbreak of War; Chapter 39. Akatsuki Rushing Out!; Chapter 40. Older Brother and Siblings; Chapter 41. Difference in Power
11	April 13, 2018	978-4-7575-5651-5
Chapter 42. Undeniable Feelings; Chapter 43. Frenzied Battle; Chapter 44. Lorelei; Chapter 45. The Vow Between Them; Omake. The Steamy Relaxation Trip

=== Anime ===
An anime adaptation was announced in March 2015. Produced by Silver Link and Nexus, the series ran on AT-X from October 3 to December 19, 2015, in Japan for 12 episodes; the episodes were later released by Media Factory through six DVD and Blu-ray volumes. Sentai Filmworks licensed the anime in September 2015 for digital and home media release in North America. The series was simulcast only on Hulu though as it aired in Japan and also aired on Crunchyroll. It was released on DVD and Blu-ray in North America on June 13, 2017.

After Crunchyroll was acquired by Sony Pictures Television, the parent company of Funimation, in 2021, Chivalry of a Failed Knight, among several Sentai titles, was dropped from the service on March 31, 2022.

== Reception ==
According to Japanese light novel news website LN News, the series had 1.5 million copies in print by February 2017. Oricon ranked Chivalry of a Failed Knight as the 29th and 17th top-selling light novel series in November 2015 and May 2016, respectively. In addition, its anime adaptation also appeared on top-selling charts.

Anime News Network had six of their editors review the first episode of the anime adaptation: Lynzee Loveridge compared the series to The Asterisk War and while she considered the Chivalry characters to be more likeable, she was critical of the blended in CG artwork and considered Stella's becoming Ikki's servant to be "cringe-worthy"; Nick Creamer expressed criticism towards the episode and called it a "concentrated capsule of hoary clichés"; Hope Chapman called the episode's plot "soul-suckingly lame" and considered Asterisk as a much nicer series; Rebecca Silverman wrote that the first episode's plot was already done by Asterisk and Lance N' Masques and while she praises Stella for some initial character development, she says this gets lost with her "tsundere ranting"; and Zac Bertschy said that the anime is "a total waste of [the viewer's] time, but it serves a purpose, however unintentional.". The sixth reviewer, Theron Martin, agreed that "formulaic and generic" wouldn't be wrong ways to describe the story and he also praised Stella's underlying motivations. Martin concluded that while the series has potential, it needs to find "fresher angles" to stand out from other similar storylines. Silverman reviewed the anime's future episodes; she called the final episode "a triumphant one in terms of Ikki's battle against his own insecurities, his place at school, and his relationship with Stella", and would later go on to say that she was "pretty happy with this ending and [she] wouldn't be sad if another season materialized somewhere along the way."

== Notes ==
=== Regarding works cited ===
- "LN" is shortened form for light novel and refers to a volume number of the Chivalry of a Failed Knight light novels.
- "Ep." is shortened form for episode and refers to an episode of the Chivalry of a Failed Knight anime.
- "Ch." and "Vol." is shortened form for chapter and refers to a chapter number of the Chivalry of a Failed Knight manga.
