= Riku Toivo =

Finnish ice hockey player

- Born: July 25, 1989 (age 37) Oulunsalo, Finland
- Height: 6 ft 0 in (183 cm)
- Weight: 168 lb (76 kg; 12 st 0 lb)
- Position: Right wing
- Shoots: Right
- SM-liiga team: Kärpät
- NHL draft: Undrafted
- Playing career: 2010–present

Riku Toivo (born July 25, 1989) is a Finnish professional ice hockey player who is currently playing for Kärpät in the SM-liiga.

== Career statistics ==
			Regular season					Playoffs
Season	Team	League	GP	G	A	Pts	PIM	GP	G	A	Pts	PIM
2004–05	Laser HT U16	U16 I-divisioona	11	11	15	26	8	—	—	—	—	—
2006–07	Kärpät U18	U18 SM-sarja	23	5	2	7	6	—	—	—	—	—
2007–08	Kärpät U20	U20 SM-liiga	40	14	9	23	28	—	—	—	—	—
2008–09	Kärpät U20	U20 SM-liiga	42	13	15	28	16	—	—	—	—	—
2009–10	Kärpät U20	U20 SM-liiga	27	12	13	25	28	—	—	—	—	—
2009–10	Hokki	Mestis	1	0	0	0	0	—	—	—	—	—
2010–11	Kiekko-Laser	Mestis	44	7	8	15	8	3	0	0	0	0
2010–11	Kärpät	SM-liiga	5	0	0	0	0	—	—	—	—	—
2011–12	Hokki	Mestis	16	3	4	7	10	6	4	1	5	0
2012–13	Hokki	Mestis	41	11	16	27	16	4	0	1	1	2
2012–13	Kärpät	SM-liiga	1	0	0	0	0	—	—	—	—	—
2013–14	Hokki	Mestis	56	14	29	43	18	12	4	2	6	2
2014–15	Hokki	Mestis	45	12	19	31	28	11	2	0	2	6
2015–16	HC Temirtau	Kazakhstan	20	2	11	13	0	—	—	—	—	—
2016–17	Laser HT	2. Divisioona	7	4	5	9	4	6	3	2	5	0
Liiga totals			6	0	0	0	0	—	—	—	—	—
Mestis totals			203	47	76	123	80	36	10	4	14	10
