= I Kissed My Girlfriend's Little Sister?! =

Japanese light novel series

- Cover of the first light novel volume

カノジョの妹とキスをした。 (Kanojo no Imōto to Kiss o Shita)
- Genre: Romantic comedy
- Light novel
- Written by: Riku Misora
- Illustrated by: Saba Mizore
- Published by: SB Creative
- English publisher: NA: Tentai Books
- Imprint: GA Bunko
- Original run: April 14, 2020 – September 14, 2022
- Volumes: 4
- Manga
- Written by: Riku Misora
- Illustrated by: Kakito Kato
- Published by: Square Enix
- Imprint: Gangan Comics UP!
- Magazine: Manga Up!
- Original run: May 28, 2022 – present
- Volumes: 3

I Kissed My Girlfriend's Little Sister?! (Japanese: カノジョの妹とキスをした。, Hepburn: Kanojo no Imōto to Kiss o Shita), or Imo Kiss (いもキス), is a Japanese light novel series written by Riku Misora and illustrated by Saba Mizore. SB Creative published the series in four volumes from April 2020 to September 2022. A manga adaptation, illustrated by Kakito Kato, began serialization on the Manga Up! website in May 2022. As of December 2025, the manga's individual chapters have been collected into three volumes.

== Media ==
=== Light novel ===
Written by Riku Misora and illustrated by Saba Mizore, the series began publication under SB Creative's GA Bunko light novel imprint on April 14, 2020. The series was completed in its fourth volume, which released on September 14, 2022.

Tentai Books published the first volume of the series in English.

==== Volumes ====
No.	Original release date	Original ISBN	English release date	English ISBN
1	April 14, 2020	978-4-8156-0631-2	October 4, 2022	978-84-19056-03-0
2	September 11, 2020	978-4-8156-0728-9	—	—
3	September 14, 2021	978-4-8156-1225-2	—	—
4	September 14, 2022	978-4-8156-1458-4	—	—

=== Manga ===
A manga adaptation, illustrated by Kakito Kato, began serialization on Square Enix's Manga Up! website on May 28, 2022. As of December 2025, the series' individual chapters have been collected into three tankōbon volumes.

==== Volumes ====
No.	Japanese release date	Japanese ISBN
1	October 6, 2022	978-4-7575-8193-7
2	October 6, 2023	978-4-7575-8841-7
3	December 5, 2025	978-4-301-00214-7

== Reception ==
In the 2021 edition of the Kono Light Novel ga Sugoi! guidebook, the series ranked eighth in the bunkobon category and fifth in the new work category.

Thomas Knight of NookGaming praised the setting and contrast between the two love interests in a review of the light novel and Tentai Books stated that I Kissed My Girlfriend's Little Sister?! has sold better than any of their other titles to date in an interview.
