= Riku Misora =

Japanese novelist

- 海空りく
- Born: January 19, 1987 (age 39); Japan
- Occupation: Writer
- Writing career
- Language: Japanese
- Genre: Light novel
- Notable works: Chivalry of a Failed Knight, High School Prodigies Have It Easy Even In Another World
- Notable awards: 2nd GA Bunko Awards Award of Excellence

Riku Misora (海空りく, Misora Riku, born January 19, 1987) is a Japanese novelist.

== Overview ==
Misora debuted with his series Danzai no Exceed (断罪のイクシード) when the first novel won the 2nd GA Bunko Awards Award of Excellence under the name Zeni no Mahō (善意の魔法). His series, Chivalry of a Failed Knight and High School Prodigies Have It Easy Even In Another World, ⁣both received anime adaptations in 2015 and 2019 respectively.

== Works ==
=== Novels ===
- Danzai no Exceed (断罪のイクシード) (Illustrated by Keīchi Sumi, published by GA Bunko, 5 volumes, 2010–2012)
- Kanojo no Koi ga Hanashitekurenai! (彼女の恋が放してくれない) (Illustrated by Satoru Arikawa, published by GA Bunko, 3 volumes, 2012–2013)
- Chivalry of a Failed Knight (落第騎士の英雄譚, Rakudai Kishi no Eiyūtan) (Illustrated by Won, published by GA Bunko, 19 volumes + 1 extra, 2013–2023)
- Ultimate Antihero (アルティメット・アンチヒーロー) (Illustrated by Nardack, published by Kodansha, 4 volumes, 2014–2016)
- High School Prodigies Have It Easy Even in Another World (超人高校生たちは異世界でも余裕で生き抜くようです!, Chōjin-Kōkōseitachi wa Isekai demo Yoyu de Ikinuku Yōdesu!) (Illustrated by Sacraneco, published by GA Bunko, 10 volumes, 2015–2020)
- I Kissed My Girlfriend's Little Sister?! (カノジョの妹とキスをした。, Kanojo no Imōto to Kiss o Shita) (Illustrated by Sabamizore, published by GA Bunko, 4 volumes, 2020–2022)

=== Manga ===
- Yakyū de Sensōsuru Isekai de Chokōkōkyū S ga Jyakushōkokka o Sukūyō desu (野球で戦争する異世界で超高校級エースが弱小国家を救うようです。) (Illustrated by Takuya Nishida, published in Kodansha's Monthly Shōnen Sirius, 10 volumes, 2021–2023)
