= Riku Pitkänen =

Finnish ice hockey player

- Born: 18 July 1991 (age 33); Suolahti, Finland
- Height: 186 cm (6 ft 1 in)
- Weight: 88 kg (194 lb; 13 st 12 lb)
- Position: Forward
- Shot: Right
- Played for: Lukko; Herning Blue Fox; Rødovre Mighty Bulls
- Playing career: 2012–2022

Riku Pitkänen (born 18 July 1991) is a Finnish former ice hockey forward who played for Rødovre Mighty Bulls of the Danish Metal Ligaen.
