= Inori =

Inori (Japanese: 祈り) is a Japanese feminine given name and word meaning "prayer", and is occasionally used as a feminine name in Japanese. It may refer to:

== People ==
- Inori Minase (瀬 いのり, born 1995), Japanese actress, voice actress and singer who played Rem in Re:Zero − Starting Life in Another World
- Inori (writer) (いのり), Japanese light novelist known for writing I'm in Love with the Villainess

== Fictional characters ==
- Inori Aizawa, an anthropomorphic character created to represent Internet Explorer.
- Inori Hiiragi, a character from Lucky Star
- Inori Yamabuki, a main character from Fresh Pretty Cure!
- Inori Yuzuriha, one of the protagonists from the anime Guilty Crown.

== Music ==
- "Inori" (Sakanaction song), 2013
- "Inori" (Hitomi Shimatani song), 2005
- Inori (Stockhausen), a 1974 composition by Karlheinz Stockhausen
- "Inori" (Ayahi Takagaki come across Feldt Grace song), 2009, a song performed by Ayahi Takagaki in the role of Mobile Suit Gundam 00 character Feldt Grace
- "Inori", a 1983 song by The Alfee
- "Inori", a 1999 single by Hitoe Arakaki
- "Inori", a 2007 DVD single by Def Tech featuring Sakura
- "Inori", a 2007 single by Miki Imai
- "Inori", a 2010 digital single by Kis-My-Ft2
- "Inori (Namida no Kidō)", a 2012 song by Mr. Children
- "Inori", a 2003 single by Tetsurō Oda
- Inori, a 2011 triple A-side single by Sekai no Owari
- "Inori", a 1979 single by Tsuyoshi Nagabuchi
- "Inori", a 2017 album by musical group Kanashimi
