= Minami Kurisaka =

Japanese voice actress

- 栗坂 南美
- Born: 15 October
- Occupation: Voice actress
- Years active: 2020–present
- Employer: Kenyu Office
- Notable work: I'm in Love with the Villainess as Pipi Barlier; The Banished Former Hero Lives as He Pleases as Riese

Minami Kurisaka (Japanese: 栗坂 南美, Hepburn: Kurisaka Minami; born 15 October) is a Japanese voice actress from Chiba Prefecture, affiliated with Kenyu Office. After studying at a voice acting training school, she voiced minor characters in several anime series in the early-2020s, before starring as Pipi Barlier in I'm in Love with the Villainess and Riese in The Banished Former Hero Lives as He Pleases.

== Biography ==
Minami Kurisaka, a native of Chiba Prefecture, was born on 15 October and educated at Nihon Kogakuin College and Kenyu Office's training school Talkback. In the early-2020s, she voiced minor characters in several anime series such as Black Clover, Rent-A-Girlfriend, Dr. Ramune: Mysterious Disease Specialist, Redo of Healer, and Birdie Wing.

In 2021, she voiced Michiru in Shichigahama de Mitsuketa, an animated short by the Shichigahama town government about the town's recovery from the earthquake. In 2023, she starred as Pipi Barlier in I'm in Love with the Villainess and voiced Fūka Sasaki in The Dreaming Boy Is a Realist. In 2024, it was announced that she would star as Riese in The Banished Former Hero Lives as He Pleases.

Her special skill is shigin, a Japanese-language poetry recital tradition.

== Filmography ==
=== Animated television ===
Year	Title	Role(s)	Ref
2020	Black Clover	Rami, others	
2020	Rent-A-Girlfriend	Yuki Kawanaka, etc.	
2021	Dr. Ramune: Mysterious Disease Specialist	Yumi, Hyōshi, Kuro (childhood), etc.	
2021	Redo of Healer		
2022	Beast Tamer	Children	
2022	Birdie Wing	Hitomi Sato	
2022	My Stepmom's Daughter Is My Ex	Infants	
2022	Shadowverse Flame	Boys	
2023	I'm in Love with the Villainess	Pipi Barlier	
2023	The Dreaming Boy Is a Realist	Fuka Sasaki	
2023	Vinland Saga	Tora	
2024	The Banished Former Hero Lives as He Pleases	Riese	
2025	Let's Play	Olivia Sweet	

=== Original net animation ===
Year	Title	Role(s)	Ref
2021	Shichigahama de Mitsuketa	Michiru	

=== Video games ===
Year	Title	Role(s)	Ref
2024	100% Orange Juice	Poyo	
2025	Tower of Saviors	Atonal Harmony Mozart	
