= Karin Nanami =

Japanese voice actress and singer

- 奈波 果林
- Born: 7 January
- Occupations: Voice actress; singer
- Years active: 2014–present
- Employer: Atomic Monkey
- Notable work: Kakegurui as Yuriko Nishinotōin; Muv-Luv Alternative as Meiya Mitsurugi; I'm in Love with the Villainess as Claire François

Karin Nanami (奈波 果林, Nanami Karin; born 7 January) is a Japanese voice actress and singer from Hokkaido, affiliated with Atomic Monkey. She is known for playing Yuriko Nishinotōin in Kakegurui, Meiya Mitsurugi in Muv-Luv Alternative, and Claire François in I'm in Love with the Villainess.

== Biography ==
Karin Nanami, a native of Hokkaido, was born on 7 January. She was named after Korin, a cat character from the Dragon Ball franchise. Her favorite cartoons as a child were Looney Tunes and The Powerpuff Girls. As an elementary school student, she enjoyed playing with her friends by pretending to play fictional characters, and wanting to "make a living doing what [she] love[s]", she aimed to become a voice actor.

In 2013, Nanami starred as Chacha in Shōji Kawamori's The Fool multimedia project. In April 2017, she was cast as Yuriko Nishinotōin in Kakegurui. In May 2021, she was cast as Meiya Mitsurugi in Muv-Luv Alternative. In December 2022, she was cast as Claire François in I'm in Love with the Villainess. Alongside her co-star Yu Serizawa, she also performed both the anime's opening and ending theme songs.

Nanami is a licensed small animal nurse. She is a sports chanbara shodan.

== Filmography ==
=== Animated television ===
Year	Title	Role	Ref.
2014	Duel Masters Versus	Kojirō, Rena	
2014	Nobunaga the Fool	Chacha	
2014	Pac-Man and the Ghostly Adventures	Beat	
2014	Tribe Cool Crew	Kimika Otosaki, Takumi	
2015	Kuroko's Basketball	Mai Izuki	
2015	Pokémon the Series: XYZ	Celosia	
2015	Ushio to Tora	Yukko	
2016	Taboo Tattoo	Segi (young)	
2017	Kakegurui	Yuriko Nishinotōin	
2018	Black Clover	Neige (young)	
2018	Devils' Line	Receptionist	
2019	Cop Craft	Semani Girl	
2019	Girls' Frontline: Madness Chapter	Persica	
2019	Kono Oto Tomare! Sounds of Life	Komaki, others	
2019	Shimajirō no Wao	Chijimucchi	
2020	Ghost in the Shell: SAC_2045	Receptionist, Caregiver	
2020	Hypnosis Mic: Division Rap Battle: Rhyme Anima	Nurses, Anchors, etc.	
2021	Battle Game in 5 Seconds	Asuka Kiryū	
2021	The Dungeon of Black Company	Cat-beast Clerk	
2021	Muv-Luv Alternative	Meiya Mitsurugi	
2022	Case Closed	Toshiko	
2022	Crayon Shin-chan	Ayu Toraba	
2022	Girls' Frontline	Persica	
2022	Shadowverse Flame	Tsubasa's Mother	
2022	Smile of the Arsnotoria	Senpaku	
2023	I'm in Love with the Villainess	Claire François	
2023	JoJo's Bizarre Adventure: Stone Ocean	Young Goat A, Pucchi's Mother	
2023	The Dreaming Boy Is a Realist	Marika Shinonome-Claudine	
2024	Failure Frame: I Became the Strongest and Annihilated Everything with Low-Level Spells	Ayaka Sogō	
2026	Noble Reincarnation: Born Blessed, So I'll Obtain Ultimate Power	Noah Ararat	

=== Animated films ===
Year	Title	Role	Ref.
2015	Kaiketsu Zorori: Uchū no Yūsha-tachi	Girl	

=== Original video animation ===
Year	Title	Role	Ref.
2015	Pokémon: Odemashi Shōmajin Hoopa	Ruka	

=== Video games ===
Year	Title	Role	Ref.
2014	Hanayamata: Yosakoi Live!	Hinako	
2016	Pokkén Tournament	Erin	
2016	Sangokushi Monogatari	Kaoru	
2018	Girls' Frontline	NS2000, SSG69	
2018	Kakegurui: Cheating Allowed	Yuriko Nishinotōin	
2019	Destiny Child	Ofois	
2019	Kyōtō Kotoba RPG: Kotodaman	Zouni, Cadmospell	
2020	Final Gear	Esmeralda	
2021	Monster Strike	Alpachiano	
2021	Project Mikhail	Meiya Mitsurugi	
2021	Smile of the Arsnotoria	Senpaku	
2022	Fitness Boxing: Fist of the North Star	Mamiya	
2022	Heaven Burns Red	Misato Nikaidō	
2023	Artery Gear: Kidō Senhime	Gurishin	
2023	Muv-Luv Dimensions	Meiya Mitsurugi	
