= Nobunaga the Fool =

Japanese stage play and anime series

- Cover of the first DVD collection released by Sentai Filmworks

ノブナガ・ザ・フール (Nobunaga za Fūru)
- Created by: Shōji Kawamori
- Anime television series
- Directed by: Hidekazu Satō
- Produced by: Yoshikazu Beniya; Takema Okamura; Shō Tanaka; Terushige Yoshie; Manami Watanabe; Kazuo Ōnuki; Hiroki Kitayoshi; Masako Iwamoto
- Written by: Shōji Kawamori
- Music by: Masaru Yokoyama
- Studio: Satelight
- Licensed by: AUS: Madman Entertainment; NA: Sentai Filmworks
- Original network: TXN (TV Tokyo), AT-X
- Original run: January 5, 2014 – June 22, 2014
- Episodes: 24

Nobunaga the Fool (ノブナガ・ザ・フール, Nobunaga za Fūru) is a Japanese stage play and anime series, part of a wider franchise titled The Fool by anime creator Shōji Kawamori. The play is a combination of live actors produced by Avex Live Creative and animation by Satelight, first performed on December 8, 2013. The anime series is also animated by Satelight and began airing on January 5, 2014, and ended on June 22, 2014.

== Plot ==
Once upon a time, there were two planets called the Western Star and the Eastern Star. The two sides were bound by the "Dragon Vein" spanning the heavens. The civilization that once had prospered has now turned to a tale of dreams, as the inextinguishable flames of war tear the realm asunder. The two planets remain engulfed in endless battles. The return of the super technology known as "Sacred Treasures" could revolutionize the world order, but no one knows of them but one person—a "heretical girl". A girl from the Western Star, Joan Kaguya d'Arc, saw divine revelations of the birth of a "Savior King" who will save the world. She embarks on a journey to the Eastern Star with Leonardo da Vinci, "the one who observes the world". They come across the heretic of the Eastern Star and "the greatest fool of the day", Nobunaga Oda.

== Characters ==
=== Main characters ===
Nobunaga Oda (オダ・ノブナガ)
Voiced by: Mamoru Miyano (Japanese); Scott Gibbs (English)
Nobunaga is the main character and a member of the Oda Clan in the Eastern Star. He is usually taken as a fool for his brash and impulsive behavior, thus both his father and the court claim that his brother Nobukatsu would be a better successor to his father. He obtains powerful Giant Battle Armor from Da Vinci, naming it "The Fool" in homage to his reputation. He is prophesied by Joan to be the Savior King that will unite both the Western and Eastern Stars.
He chooses to become the Destroyer King and faces and is killed by his retainer Mitsuhide. However, against all prognostic, what he destroys is not the creation itself, but the power of destruction instead, and becomes the avatar of chaos. Before dying, he declares his love for Joan, and vow to encounter each other in their next lives.
Joan Kaguya d'Arc (ジャンヌ・カグヤ・ダルク, Janne Kaguya Daruku)
Voiced by: Yōko Hikasa (Japanese); Juliet Simmons (English)
Joan is introduced as a woman ostracized from the village Domrémy who is guided by divine revelations of an ominous future for the Western Star. She meets Da Vinci and joins him in his journey to the Eastern Star, where she meets Nobunaga and disguises herself as a male retainer called Ranmaru Mori to fight by his side. She possesses the Sacred Treasure of Absolute Purity, one of five powerful amulets that can empower a Giant Battle Armor. She frequently has doubts as to Nobunaga being the Savior King, claiming she will never understand him. Eventually, she receives her own Giant Battle Armor from Da Vinci, naming it Orléans.
She appears to be developing slight feelings for Nobunaga, as evidenced by her jealousy during the betrothal ceremony between Nobunaga and Himiko. She admitted her love for him later on while conversing with Himiko. She is fatally injured during the final fight and remains with Nobunaga, even after he becomes the King of Destruction, until both die, while declaring their love for each other and vowing to meet in their next lives.
Mitsuhide Akechi (アケチ・ミツヒデ)
Voiced by: Takahiro Sakurai (Japanese); Mike Yager (English)
Mitsuhide is one of Nobunaga's retainers who is extremely calm and collected. He is Nobunaga's chief political advisor and the master of the Oda Clan's shinobi forces. A kind man despite his quiet demeanor, he reluctantly assassinated Nobukatsu in order to ensure that Nobunaga succeeds the clan. He seems to have feelings for Ichihime, evidenced by the fact that he felt shocked when Caesar proposed to her.
He is brainwashed by Arthur, and comes to believe that Nobunaga is the King of Destruction and tries to kill him in order to save the world. After Arthur is killed, he chooses his own path and kills Nobunaga, while realizing that he is the true Savior King and vows to Nobunaga and Joan that he will create a world of peace.
Hideyoshi Toyotomi (トヨトミ・ヒデヨシ)
Voiced by: Yūki Kaji (Japanese); Greg Ayres (English)
Hideyoshi is another one of Nobunaga's retainers who is hyperactive and vulgar, which earned him the nickname "monkey". He has shown to be proficient with machinery and is capable of great acrobatic feats, implying training in the shinobi arts. He eventually steals his own Giant Battle Armor from the Western Plant, which he named Goku, and is given the Sacred Treasure of Wind by Nobunaga. After being nearly killed by Alexander, he becomes part cyborg after being saved by Himiko's powers. He is the only person that knows that Mitsuhide killed Nobukatsu, after being told by the former.
Leonardo Da Vinci (レオナルド・ダ・ヴィンチ, Reonarudo Da Vinchi)
Voiced by: Tomokazu Sugita (Japanese); David Wald (English)
Da Vinci is a genius inventor from the Western Star. He is the one who builds "The Fool" and entrusts it to Nobunaga. He usually provides guidance to Joan and others by giving tarot card readings. He came to Joan in her village and travels with her to find out the meaning behind her divine revelations and to find the "truth" of the world.
After ending his painting The Last Supper, he dies after finally understanding the truth of the world, while letting all his tarot cards fly away.

=== Eastern Star ===
==== Oda Clan ====
Ichihime (イチヒメ)
Voiced by: Minori Chihara (Japanese); Luci Christian (English)
Ichihime is Nobunaga's younger sister. She bears a calm demeanor and beauty that catches the attention of Caesar. She loves her brother dearly and claims that most people cannot see his true greatness. She accepts Caesar's proposal of becoming his queen in exchange of ensuring the truce between the armies, but assures him that if he does not keeps his promise of protecting the Oda people, she will kill him herself, even at the cost of her own life. She seems to reciprocate the feelings Mitsuhide has for her. She dies at the hands of Nell and Bianchi when they betray Caesar and she holds him as he dies, shortly after she succumbs to her wounds, bringing despair to Nobunaga and Mitsuhide.
Nobuhide Oda (オダ・ノブヒデ)
Voiced by: Hiroshi Yanaka (Japanese); Luis Galindo (English)
Nobuhide is Nobunaga's father and leader of the Oda Clan in Owari. He is later killed by Caesar during the Takeda Clan's assault on Owari Castle.
Nobukatsu Oda (オダ・ノブカツ)
Voiced by: Nobunaga Shimazaki (Japanese); Gabriel Regojo (English)
Nobukatsu is Nobunaga's younger brother. He is believed by the court vassals, as well as his father, to be the better choice for succeeding the Oda Clan. He believes in his brother and says that he would be a better ruler. He decides to succeed his father and to later step aside for his brother when he is ready. He is later killed by Mitsuhide, who believes that the court vassals would never let him step down after he succeeds.

==== Other characters ====
Himiko (ヒミコ)
Voiced by: Nao Tōyama (Japanese); Krystal LaPorte (English)
Himiko is the queen of the nation of Yamatai. She holds a longtime crush for Nobunaga and entrusts him her Sacred Treasure of Lightning in exchange of becoming his bride. She later stands in harm's way to save Nobunaga from an assassin sent to kill him, although she manages to survive. She would continue to provide Nobunaga with great political support and allowed him to use her airship named Amenotorifune as his personal transport.
Her condition for using her Sacred Treasure of Lightning and the power of the Dragon Veins weakens her body to the point she becomes terminally ill, with only Da Vinci and Hideyoshi knowing the truth. When her condition reaches its final state, Hideyoshi tells the truth to Nobunaga in an attempt to save her. She uses her airship renamed Azuchi one final time to help Nobunaga and Joan reach the palace of Arthur. She finally succumbs to her illness, but accepts the love between Nobunaga and Joan while dying in Nobunaga's arms.
Shingen Takeda (タケダ・シンゲン)
Voiced by: Rikiya Koyama (Japanese); Rob Mungle (English)
Shingen is the leader of the Takeda Clan in the nation of Kai. He is a proud and noble warrior who set his sights on Nobunaga the moment he heard the boy had gained a Giant Battle Armor. He values honor and despises backhanded means such as assassination. His Giant Battle Armor named Furin Kazan, is enhanced greatly by the two Sacred Treasure in his possession, the Sacred Treasure of Wind and Fire. Following his loss to Nobunaga and death at Caesar's hands, Shingen passed on his Sacred Treasures to Nobunaga.
Kenshin Uesugi (ウエスギ・ケンシン)
Voiced by: Hiroki Nanami (Japanese); Clint Bickham (English)
Kenshin is the leader of the Uesugi Clan and ruler of the nation of Echigo. He greatly respected and rivaled Shingen before his death. He is shown to be an extremely cordial and polite individual even when speaking to his enemies. However, underneath his calm mask lurks a man who greatly enjoys conflict and he secretly does what he can to prevent peace from settling on the Eastern Star. His Giant Battle Armor named Visra is capable of defeating other Giant Battle Armors with ease, even those using a Sacred Treasure, despite not using his own. After being defeated by Alexander, he desires to become stronger and accompanies Nobunaga in his quest to face the Star Dragons, going missing in the process. He returns to help Hideyoshi battle Alexander, after losing one eye, finally accepting his own weaknesses.
Chacha, Hatsu and Gou (チャチャ、ハツ、ゴウ)
Voiced by: Karin Nanami (Chacha), Yui Umemura (Hatsu) and Saki Takahashi (Gou) (Japanese); Katelyn Barr (Chacha), Sara Ornelas (Hatsu), Brittany Djie (Gou) (English)
Chacha, Hatsu and Gou are three sisters who serve as kunoichi in the Oda Clan's shinobi forces under the supervision of Mitsuhide. They were assigned mainly to protect and serve Ichihime until her death. They are based on Nobunaga's nieces.

=== Western Star ===
King Arthur (アーサー王, Aasaa Ou)
Voiced by: Keisuke Oda (Japanese); Leraldo Anzaldua (English)
Arthur is the ruler of the Western Star who has just united all of it under his rule. Despite being wrapped in mystery with an unknown origin and intentions, he has proven to be a charismatic leader as his commanders are extremely loyal to him. Some people, such as Caesar, consider him the true Savior King. He seems to be capable of changing his face to appear whatever that person wants, in order to make them blindly loyal to him.
He reveals his true face to Nobunaga, and when he tries to summon the Holy Grail, he is finally killed during the fight between Nobunaga and Alexander while being crushed by the avatars of the Star Dragons.

==== Round Table ====
Gaius Julius Caesar (ガイウス・ユリウス・カエサル, Gaiusu Yuriusu Kaeseru)
Voiced by: Yuichi Nakamura (Japanese); Houston Hayes (English)
Caesar is a masked man charged with dealing with the escaped Da Vinci. He pilots a Giant Battle Armor named Quo Vadis. He decides that he wants to have Ichihime for himself when he sees her while scouting out Owari Castle.
During the Takeda Clan's assault on the Owari Castle, he appears and kills Nobuhide. He later kills Shingen with a surprise attack from behind before he can pass his Sacred Treasure of Wind on to Nobunaga (which his subordinates Nell and Bianchi then steal), then proceeds to incite the Takeda Clan by claiming that Nobunaga was the one to stab Shingen from behind.
When he accepted a truce from the Oda Clan and a temporary alliance, he put the condition that Ichihime will become his queen in return for the peace between the factions. He seems to have a rivalry with Alexander. While he does not consider it dishonorable to attack someone from behind, he claims to dislike killing women.
He is brainwashed by Arthur and tries to fulfill his wishes, until he is freed of his influence by Nobunaga. He is betrayed by Nell and Bianchi and is pierced by a spear that kills him, Ichihime and Nell, although he kills Bianchi in retaliation before succumbing to his wounds, and dies in the arms of Ichihime claiming his happiest moments were with her.
Alexander (アレクサンダー, Arekusandā)
Voiced by: Kazuya Nakai (Japanese); Josh Morrison (English)
Alexander is the strongest member of the Round Table, and Arthur's apparent second in command. His comrades hold his skills in high regard and greatly value his opinion. His Giant Battle Armor named Gaia is the most powerful seen so far, easily defeating Kenshin and Nobunaga and nearly killing Hideyoshi. He would have become the emperor of the Western Star if it was not for Arthur, according to Da Vinci.
Cesare Borgia (チェーザレ・ボルジア, Cheezare Borujia)
Voiced by: Takayuki Kondo (Japanese); David Matranga (English)
Borgia accompanies Charlemagne and Hannibal in their mission to the Eastern Star, though he chooses to remain in Magellan's flagship while they fight the Oda Clan. He stabs Hannibal in the back when she planned torturing the captive Joan. He is a sadistic person who has a loathing towards Machiavelli. He betrays Caesar and helps Nell and Bianchi in killing him. He later shoots Joan once he believes that she has fulfilled her purpose, and he is shot and killed by Mitsuhide in return.
Charlemagne (シャルルマーニュ, Sharurumaanu)
Voiced by: Kaito Ishikawa (Japanese); Jay Hickman (English)
Charlemagne is a blonde man who acts as Hannibal's partner. He wields a Sacred Treasure of Wind that creates powerful ice attacks in combination with Hannibal's Sacred Treasure of Water. He uses this skill to freeze the people of Owari so that they may serve as hostages, only to kill them all when Hannibal commanded him to "release" them. He is fatally injured by Kenshin. However, he uses his remaining strength before dying to send the defeated Hannibal and captured Joan towards the Western fleet.
Hannibal Barca (ハンニバル・バルカ, Hannibaru Baruka)
Voiced by: Sayaka Ohara (Japanese); Allison Sumrall (English)
Hannibal is a tall woman who wears a rather flamboyant dress. She appears to be the cruelest member of the Round Table as she would make repeated requests to have Caesar punished for his failures on the Eastern Star. She is quite arrogant, often boasting that she could do a better job. It is possible that there might be some bad blood between them. She wields the Sacred Treasure of Water. After a failed attempt to acquire Nobunaga's Sacred Treasures, she returns with the unconscious Joan and the deceased Charlemagne's Sacred Treasure of Wind. As she plots to torture her captive, she is stabbed and killed by Borgia.
Niccolo Machiavelli (ニッコロ・マキャベリ, Niccoro Makiaberi)
Voiced by: Aya Endō (Japanese); Carli Mosier (English)
Machiavelli is a woman with purple hair that hides her right eye because its mechanical. She seems to dislike Borgia, and she prefers using a more psychological type of torture unlike Borgia. She claims her biggest desire is being recognized by Arthur, and wants Joan's powers to achieve it. She was later killed by Borgia.
Chandra Gupta (チャンドラグプタ, Chandoraguputa)
Voiced by: Takahiro Fujiwara (Japanese); Robert Meek (English)
Gupta accompanies Alexander in their quest to conquer the Eastern Star, showing his ruthlessness by destroying the Takeda Clan territory. Unlike most characters, his Giant Battle Armor named Ganapati is shaped similar to that of an elephant. He was killed by Kenshin.

==== Other characters ====
Magellan (マゼラン, Mazeran)
Voiced by: Yoshitsugu Matsuoka (Japanese); Mark Laskowski (English)
Magellan is an admiral from the Western Star who escorts Joan and Da Vinci to the Eastern Star until they escape his flagship. He would later escort Caesar, Nell and Bianchi on their own voyage to the Eastern Star as well.
Brutus (ブルータス, Buruutasu)
Voiced by: Hiro Shimono (Japanese); Jonathan Gonzalez (English)
Brutus is Caesar's lieutenant. He is shown to be extremely loyal to his commander and follows his orders without question. Originally left behind on the Western Star, he personally escorted a shipment of Giant Battle Armors to the Eastern Star. One of these Giant Battle Armors was stolen by Hideyoshi, who defeated Brutus with the power of the Sacred Treasure of Wind.
Nell Țepeş (ネル・ツェペシュ, Neru Tsepeshu)
Voiced by: Ibuki Kido (Japanese); Margaret McDonald (English)
Nell is a mysterious and bloodthirsty little girl who accompanied Caesar to the Eastern Star. She is Bianchi's apparent twin sister. She is shown to take joy out of discomfort of others and she spies on Caesar for Borgia. When Borgia orders her and Bianchi to kill Caesar, she throws the spear that kills Bianchi, Caesar and Ichihime, before being killed in retaliation by Caesar. She and her brother seem to show relief as they die despite the pain, as the sinister red glow of their eyes fades presumably along with whatever spell they were under.
Bianchi Țepeş (ビアンキ・ツェペシュ, Bianki Tsepeshu)
Voiced by: Haruka Ishida (Japanese); Kalin Coates (English)
Bianchi is a mysterious and bloodthirsty little boy who accompanied Caesar to the Eastern Star. He is Nell's apparent twin brother. His personality is exactly like that of his sister and he also spies on Caesar for Borgia. When Borgia orders him and Nell to kill Caesar, he attacks him and before he can react, he is pierced by the spear thrown by his sister, dying alongside Caesar and Ichihime.

== Media ==
=== Anime ===
An anime television series by Satelight aired from January 5, 2014, to June 22, 2014. For episodes 1–13, the opening theme for is "Fool the World" by Minori Chihara, and the ending theme is "Axis" by Stereo Dive Foundation. For episode 14 onwards, the opening theme is "Breakthrough" by JAM Project while the ending theme is "Orchid" (蘭（RAN）, Ran) by Asuka. Anime streaming site Crunchyroll acquired the streaming rights for North America and other territories. Sentai Filmworks has licensed the series for digital and home video release in North America.

==== Episode list ====
No.	Title	Original release date
1	"The Star" "Hoshi" (星)	January 5, 2014
In the Eastern Star, Nobunaga Oda and his retainers Akechi Mitsuhide and Toyotomi Hideyoshi spot troops from the Takeda Clan with modernized weapons. Having skipped a coming-of-age ceremony for his younger brother Nobukatsu Oda, Nobunaga fails to warn the Oda Clan court vassals of the impending invasion. Nobunaga watches in horror as the Takeda Clan troops easily massacre the Oda Clan troops. In the Western Star, Joan Kaguya d'Arc is outcast by her village Domrémy after she is accused of being possessed by demons. After meeting Leonardo da Vinci, Joan is convinced to join him on a voyage to the Eastern Star in search of the Savior King. Admiral Magellan escorts Joan and Da Vinci on his flagship. After she is exhorted by a voice in her head, Joan commandeers a landing unit with Da Vinci, as they escape from Magellan's flagship. In the aftermath of the invasion, Nobunaga tells Mitsuhide and Hideyoshi that they will begin a new era. As the landing unit crash-lands like a falling star in the nation of Owari, Nobunaga is soon attacked by two Giant Battle Armors sent by Magellan. Nobunaga then activates his own Giant Battle Armor from the landing unit.
2	"The Lovers" "Koibito" (恋人)	January 12, 2014
Using the Giant Battle Armor entrusted to him by Da Vinci, Nobunaga eventually destroys the two pursuing Giant Battle Armors called Hawk One and Hawk Two, though the effort is taxing on his body. Meanwhile, the Round Table counsel members are informed that the Dragon of the Eastern Star has awoken. General Gaius Julius Caesar volunteers to apprehend Da Vinci, and the other Round Table counsel members assent. Nobunaga, Joan, Mitsuhide, Hideyoshi and Da Vinci travel via cargo ship to Owari Castle. Joan tells Nobunaga that she was fated to find the Savior King in the Eastern Star before a disaster happens. Nobunaga names his Giant Battle Armor as "The Fool". Da Vinci gives Nobunaga a watch as a token of their friendship. In exchange, Da Vinci wishes for Nobunaga to present him at Nobukatsu's coming-of-age ceremony. Following Mitsuhide's advice, Nobunaga disguises Joan as a male retainer named Ranmaru Mori. Nobunaga crashes the coming-of-age ceremony and gives the watch to Nobukatsu before showcasing The Fool in front of his father Lord Nobuhide Oda. Joan spots Nobunaga talking with his younger sister Lady Ichihime.
3	"The Chariot" "Sensha" (戦車)	January 19, 2014
In the nation of Kai, Lord Shingen Takeda, leader of the Takeda Clan, prepares an assault on Owari Castle after learning that Nobunaga has a Giant Battle Armor in his possession. Meanwhile, Nobuhide refuses Mitsuhide's suggestion to use Da Vinci's technology in order to further the development of the Oda Clan. While getting used to her disguise as Ranmaru, Joan later practices archery with Nobukatsu, who requests Joan to look after Nobunaga. Mitsuhide informs Nobunaga that Shingen and the Takeda Clan army have been sighted in Owari. Nobunaga uses a bow and arrow as his weapon against the Takeda Clan army. When The Fool is deemed operable again, Nobunaga is soon thwarted by Shingen piloting his Giant Battle Armor named Furin Kazan. As Shingen challenges Nobunaga to a duel, it is revealed that Shingen possesses the Sacred Treasure of Fire. Joan becomes surrounded by fire after she saves children from a burning village, though Nobunaga arrives in time to rescue her. Himiko, queen of the nation of Yamatai, offers Nobunaga the Sacred Treasure of Lightning in exchange for his marital vows. Magellan is seen escorting Caesar, along with twin subordinates Nell Țepeş and Bianchi Țepeş, to the Eastern Star.
4	"The Magician" "Majutsushi" (魔術師)	January 26, 2014
After winning against Nobunaga in the duel, Shingen chooses to retreat his army. Nobunaga, Joan, Mitsuhide, Hideyoshi and Da Vinci head towards Owari Castle by traveling aboard Himiko's airship called the Amenotorifune. Mitsuhide informs Nobuhide that Nobunaga and Himiko's marriage will create a strong alliance between Owari and Yamatai. Da Vinci suggests that an engagement ceremony can be held in pomp and circumstance instead of a wedding. Joan summons Nobunaga to give her a lesson on swordsmanship, but Nobunaga can tell that Joan is distracted. Himiko finds out that Joan is disguised as Ranmaru, but Nobunaga tells Himiko to keep this a secret. Da Vinci makes preparations for the engagement ceremony before providing some clarity when Mitsuhide questions why Nobunaga is being prophesied as the Savior King. Joan tells Ichihime that Nobunaga is a troublemaker, but Ichihime notes that the world cannot see Nobunaga's true nature. Nobukatsu wishes to be as carefree as Nobunaga instead of living up to people's expectations. During the engagement party, Hideyoshi charges the foreigners an admission fee for war funds while the residents attend for free. The engagement ceremony ends when Nobunaga and Himiko cut a colossal cake by using the Sacred Treasure of Lightning.
5	"The Tower" "Tō" (塔)	February 2, 2014
While approaching Owari Castle, Caesar sets his sights on Ichihime from afar. Nobunaga is dead set on defeating Shingen, something Nobuhide does not support. Ichihime asks Himiko to show Nobunaga how to activate the Sacred Treasure of Lightning. Da Vinci helps Joan decide whether Nobunaga is the Savior King or a herald of destruction. Nobunaga unknowingly gets drugged from drinking sake right before preparations for battle are made. Nobuhide pilots his Giant Battle Armor called Marishiten in order to defend Owari Castle from a surprise attack initiated by Shingen. Mitsuhide reveals that the alcohol poisoning was a ploy to restore Nobunaga's honor and turn the tides. Nobunaga, piloting The Fool, squares off with Shingen, piloting Furin Kazan. However, Caesar arrives in his Giant Battle Armor called Quo Vadis, appearing as Shingen's ally. Caesar departs after stabbing Nobuhide with his sword, which ignites Nobunaga's rage. In his dying breath, Nobuhide tells Nobunaga to trust those who reflect on the water.
6	"Strength" "Chikara" (力)	February 9, 2014
In preparation for Nobuhide's funeral, Nobunaga is nowhere to be found. The court vassals beg Nobukatsu to serve as Nobuhide's successor. Nobunaga shows up at the funeral and pours Nobuhide's ashes all over the altar. The court vassals secretly plan an assassination attempt on Nobunaga. Mitsuhide learns that Ichihime was entrusted with Nobuhide's inheritance, which would be presented to Nobunaga at the right time. An upset Joan chooses to leave Owari Castle, much to Himiko's joy. Mitsuhide also learns that Nobukatsu vows to avoid war after becoming lord of the Oda Clan. As Joan believes that Nobunaga is not the Savior King, Da Vinci gives her some hope, which she declines. Mitsuhide decides to wear a hannya mask, and he attempts to shoot Nobukatsu in the courtyard. Witnessing Nobunaga's agony at a waterfall, Joan spots a sniper attempting to shoot Nobunaga. Himiko sacrifices her life to save Nobunaga at the waterfall, while Mitsuhide cries after killing Nobukatsu in the courtyard.
7	"The Hierophant" "Higi Ō" (秘儀王)	February 23, 2014
As Himiko gets treatment and manages to survive, Nobunaga learns from Mitsuhide that Nobukatsu has passed away. Later on, Ichihime tells Mitsuhide to help Nobunaga put an end to the war. Joan confides in Da Vinci that she feels powerless, since both Nobuhide and Nobukatsu are now dead. Caesar strikes a business deal with Shingen. Mitsuhide convinces Nobunaga that the prime suspect is Shingen. Nobunaga and Joan travel on the Amenotorifune to Kai Castle, where Nobunaga interrogates Shingen. Nobunaga genuinely believes that Shingen did not send any assassins. The two engage in a duel to the death while piloting their Giant Battle Armors. After an intense match, Nobunaga emerges as the victor. In his dying breath, Shingen reliquishes his Sacred Treasure of Fire over to Nobunaga. Caesar suddenly kills Shingen from behind, while Nell and Bianchi appropriate Shingen's Sacred Treasure of Wind from his possession. Nobunaga is forced to retreat with Joan in tow. Caesar rallies the Takeda Clan and initiates a feud by claiming that Nobunaga backstabbed Shingen.
8	"Wands" "Bō" (棒)	March 2, 2014
In the nation of Echigo, Lord Kenshin Uesugi, leader of the Uesugi Clan, learns that Caesar has successfully taken over Kai Castle. Back at Owari Castle, Nobunaga is determined to take back the Sacred Treasure of Wind from Caesar. Nobunaga, Mitsuhide and Hideyoshi learn from Da Vinci that Caesar may be conducting an investigation concerning the five Sacred Treasures, which are activated through the Giant Battle Armors. Hideyoshi has an idea of bluffing the Takeda Clan. After having a premonition of Caesar backstabbing Nobunaga, Joan has doubts about this plan. However, Da Vinci says that this does not foretell a fixed future. Even Ichihime has faith that Nobunaga will pull through this predicament. Going through with the plan, the Takeda Clan are lured into a projected image of an overnight castle and are consequently destroyed. Nobunaga faces against Caesar in a fight, where Nobunaga has the underhand and is impaled from behind by Caesar's sword. Joan suddenly steps in and activates her amulet, revealed to be the Sacred Treasure of Absolute Purity. This allows Nobunaga to defeat Caesar and reclaim the Sacred Treasure of Wind.
9	"The Moon" "Tsuki" (月)	March 9, 2014
Da Vinci gives Joan a Giant Battle Armor called Orléans. Caesar shows up at Echigo Castle and requests for Kenshin to form an alliance with him. Nobunaga in The Fool helps train Joan in Orléans, while Mitsuhide, Hideyoshi and Da Vinci watch from the sidelines. However, Joan is unable to activate the Sacred Treasure of Absolute Purity. Despite admiring Shingen and despising Caesar, Kenshin agrees to form an alliance with Caesar. The Oda Clan civilians flee Owari out of panic. Ichihime later visits Mitsuhide, concerned that he is hiding in the shadows. Da Vinci encourages Joan to receive more training from Nobunaga, witnessed by Himiko from afar. Joan gains the resolve to protect Nobunaga's future, which allows her to activate the Sacred Treasure of Absolute Purity. The court vassals consider surrendering to Caesar. Nobunaga and Joan encourage the court vassals to fight back instead. With the Oda Clan now united in spirit, Ichihime finally hands over Nobuhide's inheritance, revealed as the Existential Bowl, to Nobunaga.
10	"Temperance" "Sessei" (節制)	March 16, 2014
Joan shockingly learns that Hideyoshi's little sister Asahi was killed by the Oda Clan in the past. Nobunaga strengthens ties with neighboring nations and fortifies Oda Castle in an effort to counter the Caesar-Uesugi alliance. Himiko informs the others that Caesar ordered a new shipment of Giant Battle Armors to be imported to a holy land called Takamagahara (Plane to Heaven), serving as a nexus between the two planets. When Hideyoshi wishes to have his own Giant Battle Armor, Da Vinci provides advice. Nobunaga, Joan, Mitsuhide, Hideyoshi, Da Vinci and Himiko concoct a plan to infiltrate the heavily guarded Takamagahara and steal a Giant Battle Armor while creating a decoy outside Caesar's main camp. Joan learns that Hideyoshi came from a family of Owari farmers, in which Asahi died from starvation during a famine. Although the plan goes well, a Giant Battle Armor in cargo is revealed to be manned by Caesar's lieutenant Brutus as part of a contingency plan. Hideyoshi pilots another Giant Battle Armor in cargo and names it Goku, only to be overwhelmed by Brutus. Nobunaga arrives and bestows Hideyoshi with the Sacred Treasure of Wind, giving Hideyoshi the ability to easily defeat Brutus.
11	"Death" "Shinigami" (死神)	March 23, 2014
Leaving Brutus in charge of Kai, Caesar prepares to mount a total assault against Owari. While the Oda Clan civilians evacuate from Owari, Da Vinci warns that the Giant Battle Armors will overheat if they are pushed past their limit. Nobunaga, Joan and Hideyoshi deploy their Giant Battle Armors when Caesar's troops invade and surround Owari Castle. However, the sheer number of Caesar's troops make The Fool, Orléans and Goku all overheat and in need of cooling down. Now knowing that the confrontation with Caesar cannot be lengthy, Mitsuhide devises a stratagem for Nobunaga, Joan and Hideyoshi to implement with support from Himiko. Caesar's strong will allows him to harvest enough power to release a devastating beam of energy. Although Joan uses the Sacred Treasure of Absolute Purity to deflect the beam of energy, the fallout makes a great deal of civilian casualties. As Caesar is already aware that Joan disguised herself as Ranmaru, Nobunaga spontaneously invites Caesar to a tea ceremony.
12	"The Fool" "Orokamono" (愚者)	March 30, 2014
Caesar accepts Nobunaga's invitation to the tea ceremony, agreeing to a ceasefire. At Owari Castle, Nobunaga will use the tea ceremony to find out Caesar's true colors, though Mitsuhide and Hideyoshi warn Nobunaga that Caesar might have an ulterior motive. Ichihime will use the Existential Bowl and serve as the head hostess of the tea ceremony. At Kai Castle, Caesar plans to form an alliance with Nobunaga in order to overthrow General Alexander from the Round Table. Da Vinci tells Joan that Nobunaga might surprise them. At the waterfall, Nobunaga tells Ichihime not to worry so much. During the tea ceremony, Chacha, Hatsu and Gou look out for any funny business as previously instructed by Mitsuhide. Caesar soon proclaims that King Arthur is the Savior King of the Western Star and will use the Holy Grail to save it from destruction. As Caesar attempts to waver Nobunaga into surrendering the Sacred Treasures, Joan counters by saying that Nobunaga is indeed the Savior King of the Eastern Star. Caesar proposes a temporary alliance until Nobunaga can meet Arthur. In exchange, Caesar will take Ichihime's hand in marriage, in which Ichihime surprisingly accepts.
13	"Ace of Swords" "Ken" (剣)	April 6, 2014
With the Western Star starting to collapse, the Round Table counsel members have a discussion regarding Caesar's alliance with Nobunaga as well as Da Vinci's contributions to the Oda Clan. As Caesar informs Nobunaga that the Round Table may attempt to invade Owai Castle, Nobunaga is determined to initiate a preemptive strike. In fact, Caesar upholds this by mentioning that the Oda Clan possesses more of the Sacred Treasures than the Round Table. Mitsuhide later confronts Joan about her premonitions which only foretell doom and tragedy, though Joan still has doubts that Nobunaga is the Savior King. Using the Sacred Treasures of Fire, Lightning, Absolute Purity and Wind, Da Vinci boosts the Amenotorifune to gain the ability of interplanetary spaceflight. Nobunaga then renames the Amenotorifune as Azuchi. Da Vinci tells Mitsuhide that Joan is carving her own path of reality. Hideyoshi urges Mitsuhide to confess his feelings to Ichihime before she leaves. Soon after, Mitsuhide orders Chacha, Hatsu and Gou to watch over Ichihime. Generals Charlemagne and Hannibal Barca are seen aboard Magellan's flagship heading towards the Eastern Star.
14	"The Empress" "Jotei" (女帝)	April 13, 2014
In the bed chambers, Caesar serves a delicious chocolate cake to Ichihime. As an unexpected snowfall isolates Owari, Da Vinci deduces that it was caused by adiabatic expansion. Dispatching from Magellan's flagship, Charlemagne wields the Sacred Treasure of Wind in his Giant Battle Armor called Carolus Magnus, while Hannibal wields the Sacred Treasure of Water in her Giant Battle Armor called Carthage Nova. Nobunaga, Joan and Hideyoshi dispatch in The Fool, Orléans and Goku. They are no match against Charlemagne and Hannibal, who combine their powers in order to trap the Oda Clan civilians in ice as hostages. Hannibal commands Charlemagne to release the hostages, but Charlemagne kills them instead. When Joan tosses the Sacred Treasure of Absolute Purity to Nobunaga, Hannibal holds Joan captive while Charlemagne easily wrecks The Fool. Due to Ichihime's ultimatum, Caesar pilots Quo Vadis and expels the cloud cover that served as a power source for Charlemagne and Hannibal. Kenshin pilots his Giant Battle Armor called Visra and fatally wounds Charlemagne, who then uses his remaining strength to send his Sacred Treasure of Wind with the defeated Hannibal and captured Joan towards Magellan's flagship. Once aboard, Hannibal is backstabbed and killed by General Cesare Borgia.
15	"The Hanged Man" "Tsurusareta Otoko" (吊るされた男)	April 20, 2014
Nobunaga, Mitsuhide, Hideyoshi, Himiko, Da Vinci and Caesar travel aboard Azuchi and head towards the Western Star on a search and rescue mission. Joan is chained and tortured in a dungeon by Borgia, who strongly urges Joan to declare Arthur as the true Savior King, but to no avail. General Niccolo Machiavelli brings Joan to a church in her hometown Domrémy, where Machiavelli also urges Joan to declare Arthur as the true Savior King, but again to no avail. While Nell and Bianchi inform Nobunaga, Mitsuhide, Hideyoshi, Himiko and Da Vinci that Joan will be executed, Machiavelli pretends to be a seer and decides to burn Joan at the stake. Joan suddenly has a vision of Domrémy being engulfed in fire. Nobunaga arrives in time to save Joan and return the Sacred Treasure of Absolute Purity. Joan tries to save the Domrémy villagers from the fire, reaching sainthood in doing so. However, Joan and Nobunaga are forced to evade when Borgia arrives. The Domrémy villagers are still destroyed by Borigia using the Sacred Treasure of Earth.
16	"Ace of Cups" "Seihai" (聖杯)	April 27, 2014
Borgia and Machiavelli begin their search for Nobunaga and Joan, who hide in a cave in order to outwit their pursuers. Meanwhile, another search and rescue mission is underway as Hideyoshi and Caesar dispatch in Goku and Quo Vadis. Nobunaga and Joan double back to the ruins of Domrémy, where he tells her about his recurring dream of death and destruction which ironically fills him with joy, leading him to believe that he could be the King of Destruction. The ruins of Domrémy unveil a hidden ancient shrine called Amanohashidate (Bridge to Heaven), serving as another nexus between the two planets. Da Vinci and Himiko make their way towards Amanohashidate while aboard Azuchi. Hideyoshi and Caesar distract Borgia, while Mitsuhide retrieves Nobunaga and Joan. Just as Borgia is defeated, he plants an aerial bomb onto Quo Vadis. Himiko activates the Pillars of Hercules surrounding Amanohashidate, which will transport Azuchi to a holy land called Yomotsu Hirasaka. Mitsuhide stalls Machiavelli from attacking Nobunaga and Joan, who manage to make it back on Azuchi, thanks to Hideyoshi. With Mitsuhide unable to make it back on Azuchi, Caesar promptly fetches Mitushide. However, the aerial bomb explodes, leaving Mitsuhide and Caesar stranded at Amanohashidate.
17	"The Hermit" "Inja" (隠者)	May 4, 2014
After transporting to Yomotsu Hirasaka, Azuchi loses altitude when Himiko feels lightheaded. Nobunaga saves Himiko from drowning in the purple lake. Waiting by a blue campfire, Himiko tells Nobunaga that Yomotsu Hirasaka is the eastern base of Amanohashidate, which connects to the western base in Domrémy. She also mentions that she first met him in Yomotsu Hirasaka a long time ago. Aboard Azuchi, Joan monitors Himiko, while Da Vinci assures Nobunaga and Hideyoshi that Himiko merely overworked herself from using her powers. Meanwhile, Mitsuhide and Caesar are captured by Borgia and Machiavelli. As Azuchi enters into normal airspace, Himiko reveals that Nobunaga saved her from drowning in the purple lake when they were children. Arthur unveils a young man's face as a reward for Alexander being loyal. Alexander prepares to wage war on the Eastern Star. Himiko challenges Joan to a friendly declaration of war in order to win Nobunaga's heart. Caesar is escorted, while Mitsuhide escapes due to the unseen aid of Nell and Bianchi. As Azuchi arrives at Owari Castle, Himiko confides in Da Vinci that she does not have long to live. She entrust him to perform an autopsy after her impending death.
18	"The Emperor" "Koutei" (皇帝)	May 11, 2014
General Chandra Gupta pilots his Giant Battle Armor called Ganapati and wreaks havoc in Kai. Kenshin pilots Visra and easily defeats Gupta. Alexander pilots his Giant Battle Armor called Gaia and eventually incapacitates Kenshin, who promises an honorable battle next time. Da Vinci sheds light on Nobunaga's uncertainty. As part of the conquest to invade the Eastern Star, Alexander is gradually awakening the Holy Grail by connecting the five points located in neighboring territories. After intercepting a warship full of manned Giant Battle Armors, Mitsuhide rescues Ichihime, who has been guarded by Chacha, Hatsu and Gou. Despite Mitsuhide's protest, Nobunaga decides to confront Alexander by himself. Due to Alexander's overwhelming aura, Nobunaga ultilizes the Sacred Treasures of Lightning, Fire, Wind and Earth simultaneously, though he is momentarily defeated from overexertion. Joan and Hideyoshi attempt to intercept Alexander, but Gaia tosses aside Orléans and fatally damages Goku. Mitsuhide believes that Alexander is the King of Destruction, as Azuchi departs from the land laid in ruins.
19	"Wheel of Fortune" "Unmei no Wa" (運命の輪)	May 18, 2014
While healing Hideyoshi, Himiko tells Da Vinci that a vengeful Nobunaga plans to obtain power from the underworld named Yomi. Leaving Mitsuhide in charge of Owari Castle, Nobunaga vows that he will use this power to unite the nations. Nobunaga is accompanied by Joan, as they hitch a ride with Kenshin by boat. Da Vinci warns Kenshin that he is embarking on a dangerous journey. Only Nobunaga and Kenshin are granted access to Yomi. Nobunaga and Kenshin encounter an embodiment of Shingen, who gives each of them a test of courage. In separate environments, Nobunaga faces the heat of losing his loved ones, while Kenshin faces the chill for unyielding strength. Left behind, Joan confronts herself, unable to accept her visions foretelling calamity. Da Vinci tells Mitsuhide that the future of Owari may rest in his hands if Nobunaga does not return. Mitsuhide may end up choosing to be in the shadows rather than in the light. Nobunaga manages to obtain power from Yomi, while Joan finally accepts her visions. As Nobunaga and Joan return to Owari by boat and meet with Mitsuhide, it is unclear if Kenshin has made it out alive.
20	"The Sun" "Taiyou" (太陽)	May 25, 2014
Alexander activates four out of the five pillars, which form the Pentagram. They are the Asakura Clan's Hakusan, the Akamatsu Clan's Oe, the Saito Clan's Uraise and the Takeda Clan's Togakushi. After activating the fifth pillar located in Omiwa of Yamatai, Alexander consequently cuts off the power supply in the Pentagram. Nobunaga, Joan and Da Vinci travel by boat in order to strengthen the defenses of Yomotsu Hirasaka. Aboard Arthur's floating fortress called Palais Natura, Caesar calls Arthur a hypocrite for allowing Borgia to destroy Domrémy. Arthur then unveils a young woman's face and persuades Caesar to wield the sword Excalibur, revealed as a Sacred Treasure. Palais Natura is seen hovering over Amanohashidate. In Kai, Ichihime tells Mitsuhide that Nobunaga is destined to rule and unify the nations. Nobunaga, Joan and Da Vinci encounter Alexander at Yomotsu Hirasaka. Facing off in a duel against Nobunaga, Alexander is soon defeated, though he grabs Nobunaga's sword and breaks the seal to Yomotsu Hirasaka, which restores the power supply in the Pentagram. Hideyoshi soon arrives with prosthetic left limbs. Caesar then comes and wields Excalibur in order to forge a bridge between Yomotsu Hirasaka and Amanohashidate, allowing Palais Natura to cross over.
21	"Justice" "Seigi" (正義)	June 1, 2014
Joan, Mitsuhide, Da Vinci and Ichihime witness Nobunaga expressing anger at Caesar's peace proposal for Arthur to create a new world where everyone lives in harmony. After Joan faces uncertainty when a voice tells her that Nobunaga is the King of Destruction, Da Vinci gives her some insight. Caesar proclaims that the end of the world is coming, explaining that Arthur plans to make a utopia of equal love after the Holy Grail is summoned. After Ichihime slaps Caesar for spewing nonsense to Mitsuhide, Caesar takes Ichihime inside Quo Vadis, though Caesar is thwarted by Nobunaga in The Fool. Nell and Bianchi, now subordinates of Borgia, tell Ichihime to set herself free from Caesar, who then targets Owari Castle from afar. As Ichihime stops Caesar from firing, Nobunaga has no choice but to ignore the pleas from Joan and Mitsuhide. Nobunaga slashes Quo Vadis, which finally releases Caesar from being under Arthur's control. Bianchi attempts to stab Caesar with a sword, but Nell throws a spear which pierces Bianchi, Caesar and Ichihime. Caesar stabs Nell in retaliation and dies in the arms of Ichihime, who dies afterwards in front of Nobunaga, Joan and Mitsuhide.
22	"The Devil" "Akuma" (悪魔)	June 8, 2014
Mitsuhide tells Joan that Nobunaga is the King of Destruction while Arthur is the Savior King. Hideyoshi learns that Nobunaga blames himself for the deaths of Nobuhide, Nobukatsu and Ichihime. Arthur tells Alexander and Borgia that the Holy Grail will be summoned when the Twelve Worthy Ones are present. They are still short four even with the reanimated fallen counsel members known as Perfectas. Arthur orders Alexander and Borgia to retrieve Nobunaga, Hideyoshi and Joan. Mitsuhide begins to question his loyalty to Nobunaga. Upon learning that Nobukatsu was killed by Mitsuhide, Hideyoshi fathoms it as something he would also do. Hideyoshi promises to immediately kill Mitsuhide if he ever betrays Nobunaga. Meanwhile, Nobunaga stares at the Existential Bowl and grieves over the death of Ichihime, while Joan offers to console him. With his mind fixated on what Caesar said about the end of the world, Mitsuhide is shown the big picture by Da Vinci. Himiko drains her life force in an attempt to restore the Eastern Star, much to Hideyoshi's concern. Aboard Palais Natura, Mitsuhide solely meets with Arthur and questions his true intentions. Arthur then unveils a middle-aged man's face as Mitsuhide vows to eliminate Nobunaga.
23	"The World" "Sekai" (世界)	June 15, 2014
Despite Himiko's efforts, the Eastern Star is at the brink of destruction as ash begins to fall. Nobunaga learns that about Da Vinci's sketches depicting the events in the Eastern Star. When Himiko plans to use Azuchi in order to storm into Palais Natura, Hideyoshi is ever so worried about her health. Nobunaga, Joan and Hideyoshi plan use The Fool, Orléans and Goku instead. Da Vinci tells Himiko that everything comes to an end. Nobunaga and Joan approach Palais Natura, while Hideyoshi battles Alexander. A reborn Kenshin, now without his right eye, aids Hideyoshi. Nobunaga and Joan are overwhelmed by the Perfectas. However, Nobunaga and Joan are rescued by Himiko, who drains the last of her life force and uses Azuchi in order to penetrate through Palais Natura hovering over Amanohashidate. Himiko dies after accepting her unrequited love for Nobunaga and giving her blessing to Joan. When Nobunaga and Joan reach aboard Palais Natura, Mitsuhide swears his loyalty to Arthur. Mitsuhide shoots at Nobunaga's arm and leg with a pistol, forcing Joan to declare that Arthur is the Savior King. With the ash now glowing outside, Borgia shoots Joan's side with a rifle.
24	"Judgement" "Shimpan" (審判)	June 22, 2014
With Joan now critically injured, Mitsuhide kills Borgia in retaliation. Arthur unveils his true face to Nobunaga while explaining that he can willingly be the mirror to everyone's desires. Nobunaga stubbornly chooses to follow his own destiny and bring forth destruction. Nobunaga uses all five Sacred Treasures entrusted to him in order to face Alexander in a fight of the dragons. Arthur succeeds in summoning the Holy Grail, but he is soon collaterally crushed by the fight between Nobunaga and Alexander. During a duel, Hideyoshi risks himself to save Mitsuhide, who vows to kill Nobunaga. While dueling Nobunaga, Mitsuhide delivers a killing blow despite being overpowered. The Sacred Treasures deactivate, revealing that Nobunaga devoured destruction itself. Nobunaga entrusts the future of the world to Mitsuhide. After painting The Last Supper in order to determine the future of the world, Da Vinci realizes the truth behind the universe, releasing his tarot cards and falling into a burning chasm. The moribund Nobunaga and Joan promise to meet each other in another life as they vanish into thin air with a kiss. Mitsuhide then vows to create a world of peace. Centuries later, Nobunaga and Joan meet each other as college students.
