= The Banished Former Hero Lives as He Pleases =

Japanese light novel series

- First light novel volume cover

出来損ないと呼ばれた元英雄は、実家から追放されたので好き勝手に生きることにした (Dekisokonai to Yobareta Moto Eiyū wa, Jikka kara Tsuihōsareta node Suki Katte ni Ikiru Koto ni Shita)
- Genre: Fantasy
- Novel series
- Written by: Shin Kozuki
- Published by: Shōsetsuka ni Narō
- Original run: January 26, 2018 – June 10, 2019
- Light novel
- Written by: Shin Kozuki
- Illustrated by: Chocoan
- Published by: TO Books
- English publisher: NA: J-Novel Club
- Imprint: TO Bunko
- Original run: October 10, 2018 – present
- Volumes: 7
- Manga
- Written by: Shin Kozuki
- Illustrated by: Karasumaru
- Published by: TO Books
- English publisher: NA: J-Novel Club
- Imprint: Corona Comics
- Magazine: Comic Corona
- Original run: December 24, 2018 – present
- Volumes: 9
- Anime television series
- Directed by: Kazuomi Koga
- Written by: Rintarō Ikeda; Yoshiki Ōkusa
- Music by: Kei Haneoka
- Studio: Studio Deen; Marvy Jack
- Licensed by: Crunchyroll
- Original network: TV Tokyo, BS TV Tokyo, AT-X
- Original run: April 2, 2024 – June 19, 2024
- Episodes: 12

The Banished Former Hero Lives as He Pleases (出来損ないと呼ばれた元英雄は、実家から追放されたので好き勝手に生きることにした, Dekisokonai to Yobareta Moto Eiyū wa, Jikka kara Tsuihōsareta node Suki Katte ni Ikiru Koto ni Shita) is a Japanese light novel series written by Shin Kozuki and illustrated by Chocoan. It began as a web novel that was published in the Shōsetsuka ni Narō website from January 2018 to June 2019. It was later acquired by TO Books, who have published six volumes in print since October 2018. A manga adaptation illustrated by Karasumaru has been serialized in the Nico Nico Seiga-based Comic Corona manga service since December 2018, with its chapters collected into eight tankōbon volumes as of November 2023. An anime television series adaptation produced by Studio Deen and Marvy Jack aired from April to June 2024.

== Plot ==
Allen is banished from the Duchy of Westfeldt on the account of his low level and given Gift. But that doesn't phase him in the slightest, since he has memories of his past life as a hero intact. He actually sees this twist of fate as a blessing since his father and brother changed after his mother's death, and he can finally live his life as he pleases without having to uphold the family image and name and endure their abuse as worthless since he's not gifted. That peace is cut short when he saves his ex-fiancée and only friend, and is sent on an adventure to figure out what the demons are plotting.

== Characters ==
=== Main characters ===
Allen (アレン, Aren)
Voiced by: Shouta Aoi
The banished former heir of the Duchy of Westfeldt. His mother died when he was young, and his father blamed him for it, and was despised even more when he found out her death was in vain as his son had no apparent Gift and was considered low level. However, unbeknownst to his father, Allen is indeed a hero that was reincarnated in the family with all his memories of his past life intact, as well as his powers. He saw his brother and father turning evil, and was more sad about his brother as his father never loved him. The only true friend he ever had was his ex-fiancée, Riese, as she never judges him on level or Gifts, as she knew that wasn't what made a good person.
Riese (リーズ, Rīzu)
Voiced by: Minami Kurisaka
Anriette (アンリエット, Anrietto)
Voiced by: Akari Kitō
Noel (ノエル, Noeru)
Voiced by: Sora Amamiya

=== Supporting characters ===
Mylene (ミレーヌ, Mirēnu)
Voiced by: Aimi
Beatrice (ベアトリス, Beatorisu)
Voiced by: Megumi Han
Akira (アキラ)
Voiced by: Mariya Ise
Craig (クレイグ, Kureigu)
Voiced by: Takehito Koyasu
Brett (ブレット, Buretto)
Voiced by: Ryōta Ōsaka
Curtis (カーティス, Kātisu)
Voiced by: Kōki Koyasu

== Media ==
=== Light novel ===
Written by Shin Kozuki, The Banished Former Hero Lives as He Pleases was initially published on the Shōsetsuka ni Narō website from January 26, 2018, to June 10, 2019. TO Books acquired the series, and began publishing the novels in print, with illustrations by Chocoan, starting on October 10, 2018. As of May 2024, seven volumes have been released.

During their Anime NYC panel in November 2023, J-Novel Club announced that they licensed the light novel for English publication.

No.	Original release date	Original ISBN	English release date	English ISBN
1	October 10, 2018	978-4-86-472739-6	March 18, 2024	978-1-71-830526-7
2	January 10, 2019	978-4-86-472773-0	July 1, 2024	978-1-71-830528-1
3	June 10, 2019	978-4-86-472817-1	October 21, 2024	978-1-71-830530-4
4	September 10, 2019	978-4-86-472847-8	February 10, 2025	978-1-71-830532-8
5	February 10, 2020	978-4-86-472915-4	June 19, 2025	978-1-71-830534-2
6	November 1, 2023	978-4-86-699992-0	December 9, 2025	978-1-71-830536-6
7	May 20, 2024	978-4-86-794183-6	April 23, 2026	978-1-71-830538-0

=== Manga ===
A manga adaptation illustrated by Karasumaru began serialization in the Nico Nico Seiga-based Comic Corona manga service on December 24, 2018. As of June 2024, nine tankōbon volumes have been released.

In January 2024, J-Novel Club announced that they also licensed the manga adaptation for English publication.

No.	Original release date	Original ISBN	English release date	English ISBN
1	June 25, 2019	978-4-86-472818-8	April 10, 2024	978-1-71-831876-2
2	February 25, 2020	978-4-86-472917-8	July 3, 2024	978-1-71-831877-9
3	September 15, 2020	978-4-86-699052-1	September 18, 2024	978-1-71-831878-6
4	March 15, 2021	978-4-86-699173-3	December 11, 2024	978-1-71-831879-3
5	September 15, 2021	978-4-86-699324-9	February 19, 2025	978-1-71-831880-9
6	May 14, 2022	978-4-86-699524-3	April 30, 2025	978-1-71-831881-6
7	January 14, 2023	978-4-86-699742-1	July 2, 2025	978-1-71-831882-3
8	November 1, 2023	978-4-86-699987-6	September 17, 2025	978-1-71-831883-0
9	June 15, 2024	978-4-86-794192-8	—	—

=== Anime ===
An anime television series adaptation was announced on June 20, 2023. It is produced by Studio Deen and Marvy Jack, and directed by Kazuomi Koga, with scripts supervised by Rintarō Ikeda and written by Yoshiki Ōkusa, character designs handled by Saori Hosoda, and music composed by Kei Haneoka. The series aired from April 2 to June 19, 2024, on TV Tokyo. (Note: TV Tokyo list the series premiere on April 2, 2024 at 26:00, which is effectively April 2 at 2:00 a.m. JST.) The opening theme song is "Evolve" by Shouta Aoi, while the ending theme song is "Meritocracy" (メリトクラシー) by Aimi. Crunchyroll licensed the series.

==== Episodes ====
No.	Title (Note: All English titles are taken from Crunchyroll.)	Directed by	Written by	Storyboarded by	Original release date
1	"Cast Out"; Transliteration: "Tsuihō" (Japanese: 追放)	Kazuomi Koga	Rintarō Ikeda	Kazuomi Koga	April 2, 2024
2	"The Master Blacksmith of the Sacred Sword"; Transliteration: "Seiken no Kajishi" (Japanese: 聖剣の鍛冶師)	Shigeru Ueda	Rintarō Ikeda	Yukio Nishimoto	April 9, 2024 (Note: From Episode 2, episodes are released on select platforms (such as U-NEXT and Crunchyroll) 1 week before their air dates on television.)
3	"Stubbornness and Determination"; Transliteration: "Iji to Kakugo" (Japanese: 意地と覚悟)	Yoshihide Kuriyama	Rintarō Ikeda	Yukio Nishimoto	April 16, 2024
4	"Returning Spirits Festival"; Transliteration: "Kōreisai" (Japanese: 降霊祭)	Shunji Yoshida	Yoshiki Okusa	Shinichi Watanabe	April 23, 2024
5	"The Beginning of Madness"; Transliteration: "Kyōran no Kaimaku" (Japanese: 狂乱の開幕)	Maki Kamiya	Yoshiki Okusa	Tokoro Tokatsu	April 30, 2024
6	"The Utmost Limit of Hate"; Transliteration: "Zōo no Hate" (Japanese: 憎悪の果て)	Kazuomi Koga	Yoshiki Okusa	Kazuomi Koga	May 7, 2024
7	"The Imperial Duke's Daughter"; Transliteration: "Teikoku no Kōshaku Reijō" (Japanese: 帝国の侯爵令嬢)	Yoshihide Kuriyama	Rintaro Ikeda	Shinichi Watanabe	May 14, 2024
8	"The Fairy Sovereign"; Transliteration: "Yōsei O" (Japanese: 妖精王)	Shunji Yoshida	Yoshiki Okusa; Rintaro Ikeda	Nagisa Miyazaki	May 21, 2024
9	"The Mark of a Demon"; Transliteration: "Akuma no Rakuin" (Japanese: 悪魔の烙印)	Masahiko Watanabe	Rintaro Ikeda	Kageyama Mamoru	May 28, 2024
10	"A Cry for Help"; Transliteration: "Tasuke o Motomeru Koe" (Japanese: 助けを求める声)	Maki Kamiya	Rintaro Ikeda	Shinichi Watanabe	June 5, 2024
11	"A Former Hero at a Loss"; Transliteration: "Madō Moto Eiyū" (Japanese: 惑う元英雄)	Fukaya Yurika	Rintaro Ikeda	Fukaya Yurika; Kazuomi Koga	June 12, 2024
12	"The Former Hero Lives as He Pleases"; Transliteration: "Moto Eiyū wa Suki Katte ni Ikiru" (Japanese: 元英雄は好き勝手に生きる)	Junichi Suemoto	Rintaro Ikeda	Kageyama Mamoru	June 19, 2024
