= I'm in Love with the Villainess =

Japanese light novel series

- First light novel volume cover, featuring Rae Taylor (left) and Claire François (right)

私の推しは悪役令嬢。 (Watashi no Oshi wa Akuyaku Reijō)
- Genre: Isekai; Yuri; Romantic comedy
- Novel series
- Written by: Inori
- Published by: Shōsetsuka ni Narō
- Original run: January 14, 2018 – February 21, 2021
- Light novel
- Written by: Inori
- Illustrated by: Hanagata
- Published by: Ainaka Publishing (digital); Ichijinsha (paperback)
- English publisher: NA: Seven Seas Entertainment
- Imprint: GL Bunko (digital); Ichijinsha Novels (paperback)
- Original run: February 26, 2019 – August 26, 2021
- Volumes: 5
- Manga
- Written by: Inori
- Illustrated by: Aonoshimo
- Published by: Ichijinsha
- English publisher: NA: Seven Seas Entertainment
- Magazine: Comic Yuri Hime
- Original run: June 18, 2020 – present
- Volumes: 13
- Novel series

I'm in Love with the Villainess: She's so Cheeky for a Commoner
- Written by: Inori
- Published by: Shōsetsuka ni Narō
- Original run: May 25, 2021 – December 24, 2022
- Light novel

I'm in Love with the Villainess: She's so Cheeky for a Commoner
- Written by: Inori
- Illustrated by: Hanagata
- Published by: Ainaka Publishing
- English publisher: NA: Seven Seas Entertainment
- Imprint: GL Bunko
- Original run: February 28, 2022 – September 26, 2023
- Volumes: 3
- Manga

I'm in Love with the Villainess: Maid's Kitchen
- Written by: Inori
- Illustrated by: tsuke
- Published by: Ichijinsha
- Magazine: Comic Yuri Hime
- Original run: June 16, 2023 – September 15, 2023
- Volumes: 1
- Anime television series
- Directed by: Hideaki Ōba
- Written by: Ayumu Hisao
- Music by: Noriyuki Asakura; Usagi to Uma
- Studio: Platinum Vision
- Licensed by: Crunchyroll
- Original network: Tokyo MX, CTC, TVS, tvk, BS NTV, AT-X, HTB
- Original run: October 3, 2023 – December 19, 2023
- Episodes: 12
- Novel series

I'm in Love with the Villainess: Come on and Notice Me Already
- Written by: Inori
- Published by: pixivFanbox
- Original run: December 24, 2023 – present
- icon

I'm in Love with the Villainess (Japanese: 私の推しは悪役令嬢。, Hepburn: Watashi no Oshi wa Akuyaku Reijō), often translated as I Favor the Villainess, is a Japanese light novel series written by Inori and illustrated by Hanagata. It was serialized online between January 2018 and February 2021 on the Japanese novel self-publishing website Shōsetsuka ni Narō. It was acquired by Ainaka Publishing, who published the first light novel volume digitally in February 2019 under their GL Bunko imprint.

A manga adaptation with art by Aonoshimo has been serialized in Ichijinsha's yuri manga magazine Comic Yuri Hime since June 18, 2020. As of October 2026, the manga comprises thirteen tankōbon volumes. The light novel and manga are licensed in North America by Seven Seas Entertainment. An anime television series adaptation produced by Platinum Vision aired from October to December 2023.

== Plot ==
Rei Ohashi, an ordinary office worker, is overworked to death and suddenly finds herself reincarnated as Rae Taylor, the heroine of her favorite otome game, Revolution. Although the game's three original romance routes pit her with the Bauer Kingdom's princes, Rae (a lesbian) has no interest in doing so. Instead, she sets her heart on Claire François, the game's main antagonist. Using her knowledge of the game's events that are yet to come, Rae tries to give Claire a happy ending before the coming revolution destroys any chance of it happening.

== Characters ==
Rae Taylor (レイ = テイラー, Rei Teirā) / Rei Ohashi (大橋 零, Ōhashi Rei)
Voiced by: Yu Serizawa (Japanese); Hannah Alyea (English)
An office worker who died of overwork and reincarnated as the player character of her favorite otome game, Revolution. Being a lesbian, she has no interest in the game's designated male capture targets and has instead developed feelings for the game's villainess, Claire. Rae aims to use her knowledge of the original game's plot to give her a happy ending. Underneath her happy-go-lucky demeanor, however, lies a woman beset by trauma from poor romantic experiences in her previous life.
Claire François (クレア = フランソワ, Kurea Furansowa)
Voiced by: Karin Nanami (Japanese); Lindsay Sheppard (English)
The villainess of the original game and the current target of Rae's affection. She is a noble who believes in the current aristocratic system within the kingdom and often has a low view of commoners, especially Rae, though this only serves to make her flustered and confused by Rae's interest in her. Over time, however, she begins appreciating Rei's attempts to bond with her, often resulting in slapstick punishment, which Rae does not mind.
Rod Bauer (ロッド = バウアー, Roddo Bauā)
Voiced by: KENN (Japanese); Corey Wilder (English)
The eldest heir within the Bauer Kingdom's royal family and the most popular of the romance options in the original game. He is often followed by a legion of devoted female admirers for his looks and skill. He is an energetic young man who becomes deeply interested in Rae due to her unrivaled abilities stemming from her knowledge of the original game, much to the latter's dismay.
Thane Bauer (セイン = バウアー, Sein Bauā)
Voiced by: Daisuke Namikawa (Japanese); Oscar Seung (English)
The second heir within the Bauer Kingdom's royal family and one of the romance options in the original game. He is often stoic due to suffering from an inferiority complex as he feels that his abilities are inferior to his brothers, causing him to be considered the least popular capture target. Claire has had a long-standing and obvious crush on him, especially apparent in his route.
Yu Bauer (ユー = バウアー, Yū Bauā)
Voiced by: Yoko Hikasa (Japanese); Ciarán Strange (English)
The third heir within the Bauer Kingdom's royal family and one of the romance options in the original game. While putting on the guise of a charismatic prince, it is later revealed that she is afflicted with the Crosswire Curse, which inverts genders; actually being a girl but having been cursed by her mother to gain eligibility for the throne. Originally, only Misha (her childhood friend) knew of her secret; with even Rae having been unaware of it. However, after Rae learns of her affliction and offers her a cure, she decides to break her curse and live by her true gender.
Misha Jur (ミシャ = ユール, Misha Yūru)
Voiced by: Aimi (Japanese); Marisa Duran (English)
Rae's roommate and best friend. Her family was once a noble house, but they fell from grace and were demoted to commoners. Having known the real Rae before Rei reincarnated as her, she becomes increasingly suspicious of her and eventually learns of the reincarnation. She also mutually loves Yu, being the only one aware of his gender-swapping curse, and continues doing so even after said curse is broken; showing she is pansexual.
Lene Aurousseau (レーネ = オルソー, Rēne Orusō)
Voiced by: Ikumi Hasegawa (Japanese); Kara Edwards (English)
Claire's maid who has worked for her as long as she can remember, sharing a bond that is closer to sisterly. She is a commoner and the eldest daughter of a wealthy merchant family. She is also in an incestuous romance with her brother, which disgusts even Rae. It is later revealed that her family is part of a revolutionary movement seeking to overthrow the nobility and she and her brother are exiled after the plot fails, Claire and Rae having bargained to spare them the death penalty.
Loretta Kugret (ロレッタ = クグレット, Roretta Kuguretto)
Voiced by: Sara Matsumoto (Japanese); Erin Nicole Lundquist (English)
A childhood friend of Claire's, later revealed to have a crush on her. She is from the House Kugret, a family well known for their history of military service. She has a boyish face with freckles.
Pepi Barlier (ピピ = バルリエ, Pipi Barurie)
Voiced by: Minami Kurisaka (Japanese); Abigail Blythe (English)
A childhood friend of Claire's, who later develops a crush on Loretta. She is the daughter of the House Barlier, a family with deep-seated connections in Bauer's business world. She has pink hair.
Manaria Sousse (マナリア = スース, Manaria Sūsu)
Voiced by: Nana Mizuki (Japanese); Katelyn Barr (English)
A princess of a foreign country who has known Claire since childhood. She is a tomboyish and open lesbian who transfers to the Royal Academy after being exiled from her kingdom following a scandal where she was revealed to be in a relationship with her maid. After transferring, she develops a crush on Rae and gets close to Claire to make her jealous. In the end, she transfers out again after her status is restored, having left a profound impact on Rae and Claire's relationship by getting them to seriously pursue each other.

== Production ==
=== Light novels ===
==== Conception ====
Inori, the author of the light novels, had wanted to be a writer since she was a student. She decided to apply for a light novel contest hosted by Fujimi Fantasia Bunko, and her first submitted work ended up getting third place. Following that, she became more interested in pursuing writing as a career. However, she fell ill shortly afterward, and did not begin writing I'm in Love with the Villainess until after she graduated from university.

Inori stated that her work naturally tended to focus on yuri relationships; though she wrote stories with heterosexual relationships, she felt that it "didn't quite fit". She named Shinobu Saeki, a light novel writer, as someone who had a "huge impact" on her.

Inori based Rae Taylor, the story's protagonist, on her partner, Aki, though with exaggerated traits. Inori described Aki as a "very humorous person", and felt that a story featuring a character like her would be fun to write. In addition, many of the conflicts that Rae faces in the story were inspired by Inori's life experiences. As for Claire, Inori modeled her off a "villainess" character archetype popular on the novel publishing website Shōsetsuka ni Narō, but stated that had "no special attachment" to the archetype's genre itself.

==== Development ====
Inori first serialized the work from January 2018 to February 2021 on Shōsetsuka ni Narō. She often wrote irregularly, with the time taken for a single chapter ranging from one week to three months. One time, she wrote about 40,000 characters of text in a single day.

Inori felt it was important to address societal issues, especially since she identified as part of a minority group. While doing this, she sometimes struggled to balance between the work's value as entertainment and its value in addressing serious themes. Despite this, she remarked that she was pleased with the series overall, and did not wish to rewrite it.

Inori noted that yuri stories often tended to emphasize subtle emotions, whereas her writing focused more on stronger and vivid feelings. Furthermore, rather than focusing on an individual relationship, Inori sought to connect her writing's yuri aspects to a greater narrative.

==== Publication ====
After hearing that GL Bunko was looking for yuri stories, Inori submitted I'm in Love with the Villainess. After six months and forgetting about the manuscript entirely, she received a publication offer. Her story was then officially published in Japan as an ebook.

Although sales were initially poor, Korean and English fan translations led to the work becoming popular overseas. Eventually, publishers in South Korea and North America officially released the series in print form, following which a manga adaptation began being serialized in the magazine Comic Yuri Hime. In late 2021, the series was published in print form in Japan for the first time.

== Media ==
=== Light novels ===
I'm in Love with the Villainess was originally serialized online from January 14, 2018, to February 21, 2021, on the user-generated novel publishing website Shōsetsuka ni Narō. Five volumes of the official light novel were published digitally as Amazon Kindle exclusives by Ainaka Publishing under their GL Bunko imprint from February 26, 2019, to August 26, 2021. The light novels featured cover art and additional illustrations by Hanagata.

In April 2020, Seven Seas Entertainment announced that they had licensed the light novel in North America. On March 19, 2021, Seven Seas issued a statement that they would be releasing a new version of the first volume due to the localization decisions in the original omitting several paragraphs.

No.	Original release date	Original ISBN	English release date	English ISBN
1	February 26, 2019	—	September 24, 2020 (e-book); November 10, 2020 (paperback)	978-1-64505-863-2
Chapter 1: Transmigration to Dating Sim; Chapter 2: Academy Knights; Chapter 3: The Commoner Movement; Bonus Chapter: My Lady, Claire François
2	August 26, 2019	—	January 7, 2021 (e-book); February 23, 2021 (paperback)	978-1-64505-953-0
Chapter 4: The Scales of Love; Chapter 5: School Holiday; Chapter 6: Yu's Secret; Chapter 7: The Palace; Final Chapter: Revolution; Epilogue; Bonus Chapter: Curses and Good Luck Charms
3	August 26, 2020	—	June 3, 2021 (e-book); July 6, 2021 (paperback)	978-1-64827-557-9
Chapter 9: Our New Life; Chapter 10: The Imperial Academy; Chapter 11: The Assassination of the Pope; Bonus Story 1: Things Gained, Things Lost; Bonus Story 2: Wedding; Bonus Story 3: Sweet, Sweet Alcohol; Bonus Story 4: Birthdays; Bonus Story 5: Holy Night Festival; Bonus Story 6: Your Pain Is Not Punishment; Bonus Chapter: The Lady Who Leapt Through Time
4	February 26, 2021	—	January 13, 2022 (e-book); February 22, 2022 (paperback)	978-1-63858-111-6
Chapter 12: The Ball; Chapter 13: To Change the Empire; Chapter 14: My Dear Student; Intermission: A Reunion with the Past (Manaria Sousse); Intermission: Papa's Voice (Lana Lahna); Chapter 15: The Summit; Intermission: The Beginning of the End (???); Bonus Chapter: Hot & Cold
5	August 26, 2021	—	July 28, 2022 (e-book); October 11, 2022 (paperback)	978-1-63858-646-3
Chapter 16: The Invasion of the Imperial Capital; Intermission: Fierce to the End (Dorothea Nur); Chapter 17: The Truth of the World; Final Chapter: The Future of Humanity; Epilogue; Bonus Chapter: A Day That Could Have Been

==== I'm in Love with the Villainess: Revolution ====
In 2021, Ichijinsha announced that it would begin publishing the light novels in paperback as expanded "Revolution" editions, exclusive to Japan, with the first volume released on December 18, 2021, under their Ichijinsha Novels imprint. In order to incentivize purchases by fans who may have already owned the original e-books, these editions feature refinements both to the editing and to existing illustrations, as well as additional bonus stories, additional illustrations, and other extra content. Several bonus stories which were originally published with the third light novel were also moved forward in order to better fit chronologically with the mainline story, with the result being that the existing second light novel's content is covered in two books instead of one. As of November 2023, only three novels (corresponding in mainline content to the original two novels) have been released in Revolution editions.

No.	Japanese release date	Japanese ISBN
1	December 18, 2021	978-4-7580-2319-1
2	June 17, 2022	978-4-7580-2415-0
3	December 16, 2022	978-4-7580-2473-0

==== Spin-offs ====
I'm in Love with the Villainess: She's so Cheeky for a Commoner (平民のくせに生意気な！, Heimin no Kuse ni Namaikina!) is a retelling of the original series from Claire's perspective. It began serialization online on May 25, 2021, on Shōsetsuka ni Narō. Ainaka Publishing published the first light novel volume digitally under their GL Bunko imprint on February 28, 2022, with Hanagata returning for cover design and additional illustrations. At Anime Expo 2022, Seven Seas Entertainment announced that they licensed the spin-off for English publication. In February 2026, it was announced that Seven Seas Entertainment has required the license to I'm in Love with the Villainess: Come on and Notice Me Already, a spinoff light novel series which focuses on the daughters of the two protagonists, Aleah and May, and features other characters, with volume one set to be released in January 2027.

No.	Original release date	Original ISBN	English release date	English ISBN
1	February 28, 2022 (e-book)	—	January 12, 2023 (e-book); February 28, 2023 (paperback)	978-1-68579-697-6
Chapter 1: The Strange Commoner and Me; Interlude: Dole François; Chapter 2: The Cheeky Maid and Me; Chapter 3: The Commoner Who Now Knows Her Place and Me; Interlude: Regarding Dole François (Misha Jur); Interlude: Taboo (Lambert Aurousseau)
2	December 20, 2022 (e-book)	—	March 14, 2024 (e-book); April 9, 2024 (paperback)	978-1-68579-709-6
Chapter 4: The Courting Commoner and Me; Interlude: Uncomplicated (Rae Taylor); Chapter 5: Tactless Rae and Me; Interlude: Loretta (Kind Of) Runs Away from Home (Pepi Barlier); Interlude: Background Check on Rae Taylor (Pepi Barlier); Interlude: First Battle (Loretta Kugret); Interlude: The Means and the Conviction (Pepi Barlier); Chapter 6: Sly Rae and Me; Interlude: The End of My Lonely Battle (Lilly Lilium); Interlude: Conspiracy (Pepi Barlier); Interlude: Failed Assassination (Salas Lilium); Interlude: Suspicion (Misha Jur)
3	September 26, 2023 (e-book)	—	August 29, 2024 (e-book); October 1, 2024 (paperback)	979-8-88843-432-1
Chapter 7: Dependable Rae and Me; Interlude: Even If All Should Forget You (Catherine Achard); Chapter 8: My Dearest Rae and Me; Interlude: Reminisce (Dole François); Interlude: Royal Academy Defense (Pepi Barlier); Interlude: Behind the Scenes 1 (Manaria Sousse); Interlude: Behind the Scenes 2 (Lene Aurousseau); Interlude: Behind the Scenes 3 (Misha Jur); Epilogue; Bonus Story 1: Echoes of a New Era (Loretta Kugret); Bonus Story 2: Things Passed On (Melia Larnach); Bonus Story 3: Misunderstanding (Claire François)

=== Manga ===
A manga adaptation is written by Inori and illustrated by Aonoshimo. It began serialization in Ichijinsha's yuri manga magazine Comic Yuri Hime on June 18, 2020. In February 2021, Seven Seas Entertainment announced that they had also licensed the manga adaptation.

No.	Original release date	Original ISBN	English release date	English ISBN
1	December 18, 2020	978-4-7580-2193-7	March 25, 2021 (e-book); July 27, 2021 (paperback)	978-1-64827-800-6
Chapter 1: The World of an Otome Game; Chapter 2: The First Battle, Part 1; Chapter 3: The First Battle, Part 2; Chapter 4: Freedom to Choose One's Profession; Chapter 5: Days as a Maid; Short Story: The Secret Story of the Birth of Chocolate
2	June 17, 2021	978-4-7580-2263-7	December 23, 2021 (e-book); February 1, 2022 (paperback)	978-1-64827-945-4
Chapter 6: King's Game; Chapter 7: What Being a Lily Entails; Chapter 8: Magic Class; Chapter 9: Monster; Chapter 10: Academy Knights; Bonus: One Rainy Day; Short Story: Claire and Ralaire
3	December 18, 2021	978-4-7580-2318-4	July 28, 2022 (e-book); September 27, 2022 (paperback)	978-1-63858-639-5
Chapter 11: Practical Test, Part 1; Chapter 12: Practical Test, Part 2; Chapter 13: The First Task for an Academy Knight; Chapter 14: The Way of the Maid; Chapter 15: Pretend Escorts; Short Story: Cavalier Café (Misha's Viewpoint)
4	June 17, 2022	978-4-7580-2433-4	January 12, 2023 (e-book); January 31, 2023 (paperback)	978-1-63858-894-8
Chapter 16: The Commoner Movement; Chapter 17: The Courtyard Incident; Chapter 18: The Monster of the Bell; Chapter 19: Reward; Chapter 20: Don't Say Farewell
5	December 16, 2022	978-4-7580-2479-2	October 12, 2023 (e-book); October 24, 2023 (paperback)	979-8-88843-019-4
Chapter 21: Poesie Amour; Chapter 22: Dominator; Chapter 23: Passing By; Chapter 24: Declaration of War; Chapter 25: Even If It's Not a Fairy Tale...
6	May 17, 2023	978-4-7580-2540-9	April 25, 2024 (e-book); May 7, 2024 (paperback)	979-8-88843-814-5
Chapter 26: Summer Break Plans; Chapter 27: Commoner Life; Chapter 28: Raising Fighting Spirit; Chapter 29: Foes; Chapter 30: The Sending; Bonus: Drifting Along the Waves; Short Story: At the Beach (Misha's Viewpoint)
7	October 18, 2023	978-4-7580-2613-0; 978-4-7580-2614-7 (SE)	October 3, 2024 (e-book); October 22, 2024 (paperback)	979-8-89160-504-6
Chapter 31: Lilly Lilium; Chapter 32: Girls' Talk; Chapter 33: Ohashi Rei's First Love, Part 1; Chapter 34: Ohashi Rei's First Love, Part 2; Chapter 35: Only One Victor
8	April 17, 2024	978-4-7580-2696-3	May 20, 2025	979-8-89373-148-4
Chapter 36: Yu's Secret; Chapter 37: Rising Suspicions; Chapter 38: The Ceremonial Dance; Chapter 39: What Is Your Name?; Chapter 40: Dancing Maidens; Bonus: My Happy Engagement Nullification
9	October 18, 2024	978-4-7580-2776-2	October 21, 2025 (paperback)	979-8-89373-942-8
Chapter 41: The King's Request; Chapter 42: Success and Failure; Chapter 43: The Amusement Park Date}; Chapter 44: A Sweet Treat; Chapter 45: Stalemate; Bonus: What It Means to Love
10	April 17, 2025	978-4-7580-2881-3	March 10, 2026 (paperback)	979-8-89765-211-2
Chapter 46: Resistance; Chapter 47: Revenge & Ideals; Chapter 48: Assassin; Chapter 49: Hounding; Chapter 50: Twists & Turns
11	October 18, 2025	978-4-7580-2978-0	September 15, 2026	979-8-89863-193-2
Chapter 51: Don't Give Up!; Chapter 52: Changing Tides; Chapter 53: Omens of a Revolution; Chapter 54: Blueprint; Chapter 55: Genuine Feelings; Bonus: In Jest
12	April 17, 2026	978-4-7580-9836-6	March 9, 2027	979-8-89863-952-5
13	October 16, 2026	978-4-8251-0161-6	—	—

==== Spin-off ====
A 4-chapter cooking spin-off manga illustrated by tsuke, titled I'm in Love with the Villainess: Maid's Kitchen (私の推しは悪役令嬢。メイドキッチン, Watashi no Oshi wa Akuyaku Reijō Meido Kitchin), was serialized in Comic Yuri Hime from June 16 to September 15, 2023.

No.	Japanese release date	Japanese ISBN
1	October 18, 2023	978-4-7580-2615-4

=== Webtoon ===
A manhwa adaptation written by Kim Migyo and illustrated by TSTeam, titled Korean: 내 최애는 악역영애 ~Another Revolution Story~; RR: Nae Choeaeneun Ag-yeog-yeong-ae ~Another Revolution Story~, began serialization on Ridi Books' webtoon platform on January 13, 2023.

=== Anime ===
An anime television series adaptation was announced on December 13, 2022. It was produced by Platinum Vision and directed by Hideaki Ōba, with scripts written by Ayumu Hisao, character designs handled by Yōko Satō, and music composed by Noriyuki Asakura and Usagi to Uma. The series aired from October 3 to December 19, 2023, on Tokyo MX and other networks. (Note: Tokyo MX listed the series premiere at 24:30 on October 2, 2023, which October 3 at 12:30 a.m.) The opening theme song is "Raise Y/Our Hands!!", while the ending theme song is "O.C. Optimum Combination", both performed by Yu Serizawa and Karin Nanami. Crunchyroll streamed the series outside of Asia.

No.	Title (Note: All English titles are taken from Crunchyroll.)	Directed by (Note: Information is taken from the ending credits of each episode.)	Storyboarded by	Original release date
1	"Rushing Headlong into Life in Another World"; Transliteration: "Isekai Seikatsu wa Chototsumōshin" (Japanese: 異世界生活は猪突猛進。)	Hideaki Ōba	Hideaki Ōba	October 3, 2023
After finishing a workday at a small company with exploitative overtime, Rei Ohashi dies and is reincarnated as Rae Taylor, the main character of her favorite otome game, Revolution. Once she realizes this, she repeatedly expresses her love to Claire François, the villainess whom she has a massive crush on. Despite Claire's annoyance and her continued harassment, Rae is immensely turned on, to everyone's confusion. They encounter the three princes that attend the school, Rod, Yu, and Thane Bauer, the main love interests in the game. Rae causes Claire to become flustered when she reveals she knows she has a crush on Thane. Later on, in an attempt to get rid of Rae, Claire challenges her to compete in the upcoming academic challenge. Rae beats Claire in the general curriculum, while Claire beats her in the etiquette exam. When the magic exams results are announced, Rae is revealed to have an "unmeasurable" magic ability, shocking everyone.
2	"A Maid's Job Is a Labor of Love"; Transliteration: "Meido no Shigoto wa Aijō Hōshi" (Japanese: メイドの仕事は愛情奉仕。)	Motohiko Niwa	Motohiko Niwa	October 10, 2023
Claire is stunned to learn that the "commoner" Rae possesses two magical elements, something which intrigues Rod. Since Rae won the bet, due to the terms being that Claire "did not win", her one demand is that Claire never give up, no matter what. Rae applies to be Claire's personal handmaid, and blackmails Claire's father using secret knowledge from the game to force him to approve her for the job, to Claire's irritation. Rae meets Lene Aurousseau, the family maid since Claire was a child, and they later go to a public bath together where Rae continues to tease Claire. At night, Claire confronts Rae on what she is really after, believing that no one could love someone with a personality such as hers. Rae continues her insistence she is attracted to both her looks and personality, and commits to making Claire believe that she is in love with her.
3	"My Love Is a Series of Ups and Downs"; Transliteration: "Watashi no Koi wa Shichiten Hakki" (Japanese: 私の恋は七転八起。)	Hideaki Ōba	Hideaki Ōba	October 17, 2023
Rae plays Rod in a game of chess and he narrowly beats her. Following this, Rae and Claire play a game of chess until Yu brings them into a game of poker, which he wins. Rae sets up the "King Game" with the goal of having Thane and Claire kiss, but Thane sees through it. Later, Rae's best friend Misha Jur asks Rae if she is a lesbian, which she confirms. The two of them, Lene, and Claire proceed to talk about sexual attraction and how people can be prejudiced. Rae states that she is happy to simply admire Claire every day, even though she knows that her feelings will never be reciprocated, wanting to support Claire's love of Thane. Internally, however, Rae admits to herself that despite wanting Claire to be happy, she still feels painful due to incidents in her past. Claire pours water on two female students she overhears criticizing Rae, and makes her feel better after saying that she "still hates her".
4	"When Monsters Attack, Unpreparedness Is the Greatest Enemy"; Transliteration: "Mamono no Shūgeki wa Yudantaiteki" (Japanese: 魔物の襲撃は油断大敵。)	Motohiko Niwa	Motohiko Niwa	October 24, 2023
Rae and her class take part in an outdoors exercise where they practice their magic and learn more about their origins and aptitude from their teacher, Professor Torrid. A stray magic blast from one of the students hits a slime monster in hiding, causing it to run amok. Rae uses her earth magic to help Torrid keep the monster contained while everyone else attacks. However, it is ineffective and the slime starts picking the students up. Rae is among those captured, but Claire is able to break free and together with Thane, they successfully destroy the slime. Meanwhile, Rae finds a small slime in hiding, realizing that the large slime was the mother just protecting her child. She decides to adopt it, using a Familiar Pact and naming it "Ralaire". She unintentionally disturbs a romantic moment between Claire and Thane, but feels happy when Claire inadvertently voices concern over Rae's safety. Later, Rae attempts to keep Ralaire a secret, but is quickly discovered by Misha, and then Claire.
5	"The Knight Exam Is Packed with Drama"; Transliteration: "Kishidan Shiken wa Haranbanjō" (Japanese: 騎士団試験は波瀾万丈。)	Hideaki Ōba	Hideaki Ōba	October 31, 2023
Rae is able to convince Claire to let her keep Ralaire, though she is told to reveal its existence to everyone. Rae, Claire, Misha, and the princes try out to join the "Academy Knights", the school's version of the Student Council, and pass the written portion of the exam. Claire proposes another competition to Rae where if she fails the exam she must leave the academy, which Rae reluctantly agrees to. The practical exam begins as a series of 1v1 magic battles: Thane defeats Yu, while Rod defeats Misha. The final battle is Rae vs. Claire. Rae uses her earth magic to create a variety of shields to attack Claire and defend herself, using her knowledge of the game. She eventually wins the battle by trapping Claire in a deep hole, further enraging Claire when she realizes Rae had not even used her water magic. In the end, all six of them pass the exam anyway, as it was merely about demonstrating their raw abilities to Lorek, the captain of the Knights. As a result of their deal, Rae simply asks Claire to make the same promise to never give up.
6	"The Secret Reason Must Not Be Told to Anyone"; Transliteration: "Himitsu no Wake wa Tagon Muyō" (Japanese: 秘密の理由は他言無用。)	Motohiko Niwa	Motohiko Niwa	November 7, 2023
The Academy Knights prepare for the upcoming Foundation Day Fair. Thanks to an offhand comment from Rae, Rod suggests a gender-swapped café where the guys dress as maids and the girls as butlers. Lambert, the Knights' magical specialist and Lene's brother, requests Rae and Claire's help in investigating a suspicious figure that has been appearing in the kitchen at night. While spending the night there, Claire quickly realizes Rae is the "ghost" who has been secretly practicing her baking. She attempts to leave, but due to being too scared of the dark, she begrudgingly sleeps with Rae in the kitchen. Claire proceeds to dream about her past and how she wanted to spend more time with her mother, who was always busy with her royal duties. She ended up dying in a carriage accident, throwing Claire into despair due to the last words she said to her mother was that she hated her. Later, Rae creates sandwiches to serve at the café, using "new recipes" from Broumet. Lene deduces that Rae is the source of said recipes, having sold ones such as chocolate and mayonnaise to them; Rae has Lene keep the revelation a secret.
7	"What Makes or Breaks a School Fair Is the Cross-Dressing Café"; Transliteration: "Gakusai no Kimete wa Gyakuten Kissa" (Japanese: 学祭の決め手は逆転喫茶。)	Motohiko Niwa	Hiroaki Yoshikawa	November 14, 2023
The Academy Knights request Lene's help in training them to become servers for the Foundation Day café; she ends up going overboard in her role as the instructor. The Fair finally arrives and the Knights run their café. During one of her breaks, Rae has herself served by Claire, to the latter's annoyance. Rae ends up having to serve the snobby Prince Marcel of the Empire of Loro, an event from the game where she is constantly pestered until one of the princes intervenes. Instead, Claire appears and helps save her from the predicament. When Claire is on break, Rae takes her to explore the rest of the Fair. A commoner named Matt approaches Rae seeking her support in their "Commoner Movement" to achieve equality between the royals and commoners, but she is pulled away by Claire. Rae gives Claire a necklace, causing Claire to once again ask why Rae is so interested in her, leading Rae to internally reflect how the stress of her past life pushed her to the brink until the game version of Claire "saved her". Later, the girls learn that Yu's attendant Dede attacked Matt with his magic.
8	"The Swirling Currents Are All Machinations"; Transliteration: "Uzumaku Nagare wa Kenbōjussū" (Japanese: 渦巻く流れは権謀術数。)	Hideaki Ōba	Hideaki Ōba	November 21, 2023
Rae, Claire, and Misha learn from Matt that he got into an argument with Dede, who pulled out his wand and nearly burnt him alive with his magic. Elsewhere, Dede claims he only meant to threaten Matt. The Knights inspect his wand for tampering, while protesting commoners begin to grow. The princes get into an argument over how to deal with the situation, causing them to theorize the Spiritual Church is behind the incident. While the Knights attempt to calm things down, Dede's sentence is eventually revealed to be one week of house arrest, which sparks further dissension. That night, Rae uses her magic on Claire to put her to sleep, entrusting Lene to keep her safe in her room. Using her knowledge of the game, Rae confronts the true mastermind, Lambert, who orchestrated the events to steal a bell which can summon monsters. She figures out he is acting under the Church's behalf, all to protect Lene, whom he is having an incestuous relationship with. Lene then appears and attempts to hold Claire hostage, but she awakens. Suddenly, a mysterious masked man Rae does not recognize arrives, repairs the bell she broke, and forces Lambert to activate it, awakening a nearby chimera.
9	"My Master Will Never Change"; Transliteration: "Watashi no Omo wa Eien Fuhen" (Japanese: 私の主は永遠不変。)	Motohiko Niwa	Motohiko Niwa	November 28, 2023
Rae acts as bait to lure the chimera away while Claire charges up a powerful magic blast, which successfully destroys it. The masked man suddenly re-appears and tries to attack Claire, but Thane jumps in and saves her. The masked man disappears as Thane is revealed to be seriously poisoned by his attack; Rae uses her knowledge of the game to heal Thane. Lene and Lambert are arrested by the Knights awaiting their impending execution due to treason, the Commoner Movement is disbanded, the rioting ceases upon the revelations, and Rae and Claire are invited to receive a reward from the King as thanks for saving the day. They use the opportunity to humbly request that Lene and Lambert's lives be spared due to them also being victims. While this is initially met with trepidation, with Thane's help, the King chooses to exile them instead. As Lene and Lambert head out to leave the country, Rae and Claire say their goodbyes to the former, with Rae giving her some recipes, and Claire declaring that they will see each other again. After they are gone, Rae comforts a distraught Claire.
10	"My New Rival in Love Is a Perfect Superhuman"; Transliteration: "Aratana Koigataki wa Kanpeki Chōjin" (Japanese: 新たな恋敵は完璧超人。)	Hideaki Ōba	Hiroaki Yoshikawa	December 5, 2023
Rae has been struggling to cheer Claire up since Lene left. Just then, Claire learns that her childhood friend, Manaria Sousse, has transferred into the Royal Academy after having lost out in the succession in her kingdom. Manaria proceeds to become extremely popular, in particular amongst the girls, and especially Claire, who acts very affectionate towards her. Rae is jealous of Manaria due to her role in the game being just to keep Claire busy with the princes. However, Manaria becomes increasingly intrigued by Rae and her actions. When Rod challenges Manaria to a duel, she demonstrates her incredible abilities as not only a quad-caster, but also being capable of using spell-breaking magic. The group later discuss amongst themselves about a magical ceremony inspired by an old poem which people use to determine who they would marry. Rae's jealously reaches a boiling point after Claire states she prefers Manaria over her, which is further exacerbated when Manaria starts openly flirting with Claire.
11	"A Near-Miss in Love is Certain Doom"; Transliteration: "Koi no Surechigai wa Zettai Zetsumei" (Japanese: 恋のすれ違いは絶体絶命。)	Hideaki Ōba	Hiroaki Yoshikawa	December 12, 2023
Rae is forced to deal with Manaria as she continues to spend more time with Claire. The Knights begin preparing for the Amour Ceremony, in which two people compete for another's affection by examining the weight of two objects on a magical artifact. Claire's friends, Loretta and Pepi, attempt to warn Rae about Manaria based on rumors they have heard about her. Manaria later confronts Rae about her feelings for Claire, believing she is just being a coward and making excuses to not get hurt. To test her resolve, Manaria challenges Rae to a magical duel. Despite giving it her all, Rae is brutally defeated by Manaria in battle by her "Domination" attack. As Manaria heals Rae, she notices Claire's horrified reaction. When Claire confronts Rae about her foul mood, Rae reveals the duel was to determine who was worthy to be with her. Claire is outraged over this revelation, and in response, Rae angrily quits her job as a maid, which Claire bluntly accepts. Rae runs off, regretting what she just did, while Claire is secretly upset about the situation.
12	"The Villainess and I Are in Love"; Transliteration: "Watashi to Oshi wa Sōshisōai" (Japanese: 私と推しは相思相愛。)	Motohiko Niwa	Motohiko Niwa	December 19, 2023
Manaria furiously confronts Rae over abandoning Claire. She then reveals how she was in love with her maid, but after driving her away, proceeded to visit brothels in a vain attempt to satisfy her desires. Manaria decides Claire will be her next target, spurring Rae on to challenge her to compete in the Amour Ceremony. Rae and Ralaire take on several requests fighting monsters in order to find a certain item. On the day of, Manaria presents the Flower of Flora and declares her love for Claire. Rae then returns and presents a supposed twig, which suddenly grows into a massive tree, winning the competition. As Rae declares her love for Claire, Manaria reveals she has been in love with Rae all along. When she attempts to kiss Rae, Claire instinctively declares that Rae is hers. Manaria later heads back home to her kingdom after the first prince dies. Before she leaves, Manaria questions who Rae really is, while Rae realizes Manaria purposefully played the role of the bad guy in order to get her and Claire to become closer with each other. Rae and Claire return to their class, with Claire now calling Rae by her name.

== Reception ==
=== Accolades ===
In March 2021, I'm in Love with the Villainess placed fifth in AnimeJapan's annual Manga We Want to See Animated Ranking. In June 2021, the series was nominated for the Best Printed Manga category in the Next Manga Awards and placed seventeenth out of fifty nominees. It was nominated for the same award and placed eighth out of fifty nominees in 2022. It placed ninth in the 2022 Tsutaya Comic Awards.

I'm in Love with the Villainess won "Best Light Novel" at the 2022 Manga Barcelona Awards. In the 2023 awards, it won the same category again, along with the "Best Yuri" category. The series ranked 20th in the tankōbon section of the 2023 edition of Kono Light Novel ga Sugoi!, a light novel guidebook. The anime adaptation placed fifth at the 2024 Tokyo Anime Awards.

=== Critical reception ===
==== Light novels ====
Erica Friedman of Okazu awarded the first light novel an overall score of nine out of ten, acclaiming the "extraordinary" and "surprising" work in almost all respects. She praised Rae's portrayal through the use of narrative voice, and favorably compared the story's worldbuilding and character writing compared to similar series. She concluded by commending the English-language translation and calling it the "series to beat" for 2020.

Rebecca Silverman of Anime News Network gave a generally positive review to the first light novel. She opined that although the female leads "start off as almost intensely difficult to like", they developed throughout the novel in a way which made them "much easier to root for." She also praised the story's same-sex representation, saying that the "book's heart definitely feels like it's in the right place", and concluded that it was "worth reading".

Kevin Cormack, also of Anime News Network, praised the audiobook version of the light novels for reinstating segments missing from the English-print books which explained Rae's motivations through the lens of Japanese culture. He was particularly positive about the series' social commentary regarding inequality and social status, as well as its "complex and endearing" characters and "exciting" story.

==== Anime ====
The anime adaptation received mixed-to-positive reviews. In a review of the premiere episode by Anime News Network critics, James Beckett found the plot repetitive and was unenthused by the visuals, while Rebecca Silverman disliked the portrayal of Rae's interactions with Claire. On the other hand, Richard Eisenbeis commended the premise for its originality and potential, while Nicholas Dupree called the series "hilarious" and "infinitely funny".

Cormack named the anime as one of his favorite series of Fall 2023, stating that it stood above its "subgenre competitors" and had "humor [that] serves its characters". Though he found Rae "initially offputting", he felt that Rae and Claire were portrayed as "multi-layered characters" later on. However, he lamented that the series ended partway through the main story arc.

Andrew Henderson of Anime Feminist found Rae's actions toward Claire in the first episode grating, though they described it as "kinda funny" in small amounts, and hoped that their dynamic changed as the series went forward. After watching the second episode, they decided it "[held] potential" but, as of that episode, was still struggling with "uncomfortable gags".

Cy Catwell, also of Anime Feminist, was more positive reviewing the series as a whole. They were "charmed" by Rae and praised the show's portrayal of the deeper reasons behind her behavior. Noting the series' positive LGBTQ+ representation, they hoped that the show got a second season, particularly because the finale left the story in a "fascinating" position.

=== Themes and analysis ===
Various critics commented on the series' LGBTQ+ representation, with many feeling that the Rae's open expression of her sexuality was unusual for the genre. Silverman noted that Rae has "zero problems" coming out, and that Rae's straightforward lack of heterosexual attraction "eschews a lot of common tropes" compared to similar works. Similarly, Friedman commended a scene in the first book where Rae and Misha had a "frank" discussion regarding sexuality. Catwell opined that the show used its directness to engage with "real-world issues" and explore what it meant to "be queer using queer language".

== See also ==
- Welcome to Japan, Ms. Elf!, a light novel series whose manga adaptation has the same illustrator
