= Inori (writer) =

Japanese novelist

- いのり
- Born: July 19
- Occupation: Novelist
- Writing career
- Language: Japanese
- Period: 2019–present
- Genre: Yuri
- Notable work: I'm in Love with the Villainess
- Notable awards: Manga Barcelona Awards (2022, 2023 (Note: In two categories))

Inori (いのり (Note: Stylized with a full stop as "いのり。"); born July 19) is a Japanese novelist best known for her light novel series I'm in Love with the Villainess, which was adapted into an anime television series in 2023. She writes yuri works and has won three Manga Barcelona Awards.

== Career ==
=== Early career ===
Inori had wanted to be a writer since she was a student. She decided to apply for a light novel contest hosted by Fujimi Fantasia Bunko, and her first submitted work ended up making it to the third round of selection. Following that, she became interested in pursuing writing as a career. However, she fell ill shortly afterward, and did not begin publishing on Shōsetsuka ni Narō until after she had graduated from university and recovered.

=== I'm in Love with the Villainess ===
Inori first serialized I'm in Love with the Villainess from January 2018 to February 2021 on the web novel publishing site Shōsetsuka ni Narō. Although the series was popular, it did not place well in the website's contests. Nevertheless, she kept writing because she enjoyed it as a hobby. Later, when she found out that GL Bunko was looking for yuri stories, Inori submitted I'm in Love with the Villainess. After six months and almost forgetting about the manuscript entirely, she received a publication offer, which would become her debut as a commercial writer. Her story was then officially published in Japan as an e-book. Five books were released digitally between February 2019 and August 2021, with illustrations by Hanagata.

Although sales were initially poor, Korean and English fan translations led to the work becoming popular overseas. Eventually, publishers in South Korea and North America officially released the series in print form. In December 2021, the series was released in print form in Japan for the first time by Ichijinsha. In total, three physical volumes were released, with the final one published in December 2022.

In June 2020, a manga adaptation of I'm in Love with the Villainess with illustrations by Aono Shimo began serialization in Comic Yuri Hime. As of July 2026, twelve volumes have been released. The series placed fifth in AnimeJapan's 2021 annual Manga We Want to See Animated Ranking. It ranked eighth in the 2022 Next Manga Awards and ninth in the 2022 Tsutaya Comic Awards.

In May 2021, Inori began serializing a spin-off series titled I'm in Love with the Villainess: She's So Cheeky for a Commoner on Shōsetsuka ni Narō, which retells I'm in Love with the Villainess from a different character's perspective. She concluded the work in October 2021. The series was digitally released in three volumes by GL Bunko between February 2022 and September 2023.

I'm in Love with the Villainess won "Best Light Novel" at the 2022 Manga Barcelona Awards. In the 2023 awards, it won the same category again, along with the "Best Yuri" category. The series ranked 20th in the tankōbon section of the 2023 edition of Kono Light Novel ga Sugoi!, a light novel guidebook.

An anime adaptation of I'm in Love with the Villainess aired from October to December 2023. Inori praised the anime, stating that it was a faithful adaptation and that the two lead voice actors "brought [their characters] to life". The anime series went on to place fifth at the 2024 Tokyo Anime Awards.

=== More yuri series ===
Once the publication of I'm in Love with the Villainess was settled, Inori began deciding on her next work. After presenting several ideas to an editor from the entertainment company Straight Edge, she was advised to write about a premise that would become the light novel The Girl Who Wants to Be a Hero and the Girl Who Ought to Be a Hero. She published the novel in November 2023 under the Dengeki Bunko imprint.

In January 2025, Inori announced that she would self-publish Homunculus Tears: Alchemy for the Brokenhearted in April of that year. The series was subsequently digitally released on Amazon under the imprint Inori Bunko. In January 2026, Inori published Furimukinasai, Watakushi ni! (振り向きなさい, わたくしに!, lit. 'Turn your gaze towards me!'), (Note: Later licensed in English as I'm in Love with the Villainess: Come On and Notice Me Already) a sequel to I'm in Love with the Villainess, as an e-book.

In May 2026, Inori released a doujinshi novel under the title Reijō Teimu: Ochikobore Shōjo-tachi no Gyakuten Geki (令嬢テイム〜落ちこぼれ少女たちの逆転劇〜, lit. 'Lady taming: the comeback story of the underachieving girls'). In June 2026, the publishing company Dokico announced that it would publish a new series by Inori titled Poison for the Moon, Medicine for the Night—An Assassin Who Longs for Death and a Vampire Marked for Death in multiple languages in December 2026.

== Style and influences ==
Inori writes yuri novels, a genre focusing on relationships between female characters. She described her focus on the genre as simply what was natural for her. She noted that traditional yuri works tend to focus on relatively delicate emotional portrayals, whereas her novels usually have more intense depictions that often involve situating a relationship within a broader story.

Inori's writing often addresses themes of societal norms and expectations, which Inori said that she was interested in as a member of a minority group. While she was "personally satisfied" with the result in I'm in Love with the Villainess, she expressed a desire to improve the balance between providing entertainment value and confronting serious issues in her later works.

Inori has mentioned Shinobu Saeki as having a "huge impact" on her, saying that "if I hadn't read her work, I would never have been a writer like this now." She has also named Bokuto Uno, Yuu Kamiya, and Teren Mikami as writers who she particularly admires. She stated that her favorite work she sees as yuri is The Demon Girl Next Door by Izumo Ito. Inori's writing schedule is irregular; in an interview, she mentioned that for I'm in Love with the Villainess and its spin-off, the time she took to write a single chapter varied from one week to three months. One time, she went through 100 sheets of 400-character paper in a day.

== Personal life ==
Inori has a partner named Aki. Inori based one of the main characters from I'm in Love with the Villainess on Aki's personality.

Inori has mentioned that she hopes to continue being a light novel writer for a long time, noting that it was the only profession she had ever worked in even though she had not initially intended to become a full-time writer. She said that her goal was for her works to achieve a stable level of sales.

Inori sometimes posts on her X account in languages other than Japanese. In a 2023 interview, she said that she "knew a little English". In 2024, she revealed on X that she was born on July 19.

== Works ==
All years and publishers are for the original Japanese-language release.

- I'm in Love with the Villainess (私の推しは悪役令嬢。, Watashi no Oshi wa Akuyaku Reijō) (Five volumes, 2019–2021, GL Bunko)
- I'm in Love with the Villainess: She's so Cheeky for a Commoner (平民のくせに生意気な!, Heimin no Kuse ni Namaikina!) (Three volumes, 2022–2023, GL Bunko)
- The Girl Who Wants to Be a Hero and the Girl Who Ought to Be a Hero (勇者になりたい少女と, 勇者になるべき彼女, Yūsha ni Naritai Shōjo to, Yūsha ni Naru Beki Kanojo) (One volume, 2023, Dengeki Bunko)
- Homunculus Tears: Alchemy for the Brokenhearted (ホムンクルスの涙: 消えたいキミへの錬金術, Homunkurusu no Namida: Kietai Kimi e no Renkinjutsu) (One volume, 2025, Inori Bunko)
- Furimukinasai, Watakushi ni! (振り向きなさい, わたくしに!) (One volume, 2026, GL Bunko)
- Reijō Teimu: Ochikobore Shōjo-tachi no Gyakuten Geki (令嬢テイム〜落ちこぼれ少女たちの逆転劇〜) (One volume, 2026, Inori Bunko)
